= List of Chinese football transfers winter 2015 =

This is a list of Chinese football transfers for the 2015 season winter transfer window. Super League and League One transfer window opened on 1 January 2015 and closed on 27 February 2015. League Two transfer window opened on 1 March 2015 and closed on 15 March 2015.

== Super League ==
=== Beijing Guoan ===
In:

No.	Pos.	Nation	Player
3	DF	CHN	Li Lei (from Henan Jianye)
14	DF	CHN	Jin Pengxiang (from Dalian Aerbin)
15	GK	CHN	Shi Xiaotian (loan from Liaoning Whowin)
19	FW	CHN	Yu Dabao (from Dalian Aerbin)
21	FW	SWE	Erton Fejzullahu (from (Sweden) Djurgårdens IF)
-	FW	NGA	Peter Utaka (loan return from Shanghai Shenxin)
-	FW	CHN	Mao Jianqing (loan return from Qingdao Jonoon)

Out:

No.	Pos.	Nation	Player
1	GK	CHN	Zhang Sipeng (to Jiangsu Sainty)
3	DF	CHN	Yu Yang (to Guangzhou R&F)
7	DF	CHN	Yang Yun (loan to Liaoning Whowin)
10	MF	CHN	Zhang Xizhe (to (Germany) VfL Wolfsburg)
15	FW	NGA	Peter Utaka (to (Japan) Shimizu S-Pulse)
21	FW	SWE	Erton Fejzullahu (loan return to (Sweden) Djurgårdens IF)
36	GK	CHN	Bai Xiaolei (to Harbin Yiteng)
57	DF	CHN	Zhao Bin (Released)
61	DF	CHN	Zhang Junzhe (Released)
63	MF	CHN	Zhang Jian (Released)
64	MF	CHN	Xu Wu (to Beijing BIT)
-	FW	CHN	Mao Jianqing (to Shijiazhuang Ever Bright)

=== Changchun Yatai ===
In:

No.	Pos.	Nation	Player
7	MF	CHN	Han Deming (from Harbin Yiteng)
8	MF	CHN	Du Zhenyu (from Tianjin Teda)
9	FW	BOL	Marcelo Martins Moreno (from (Brazil) Grêmio)
12	MF	CHN	Zhu Yifan (from Henan Jianye)
14	DF	CHN	Shao Shuai (from Harbin Yiteng)
17	MF	CHN	Ma Xiaolei (from Meizhou Wuhua)
22	MF	CHN	Li Shang (loan return from Lijiang Jiayunhao)
25	MF	HUN	Ákos Elek (from (Hungary) Diósgyőri VTK)
26	MF	CHN	Chen Liansheng (loan return from Jiangxi Liansheng)
27	MF	TPE	Ko Yu-Ting (from (Chinese Taipei) Tatung F.C.)
28	MF	CHN	Che Kai (loan return from Dalian Transcendence)
30	GK	CHN	Yi Fan (loan return from Lijiang Jiayunhao)
31	FW	NIG	Moussa Maazou (from (Portugal) Marítimo)
32	DF	CHN	Li Guang (loan return from Lijiang Jiayunhao)
33	MF	CHN	Liu Qiming (loan return from Yinchuan Helanshan)
37	DF	TPE	Wang Chueh-Chun (Free Agent)
-	MF	CHN	Niu Luyuan (loan return from Yinchuan Helanshan)
-	FW	CHN	Cheng Changcheng (loan return from Yinchuan Helanshan)
-	MF	CHN	Yang He (loan return from Jiangxi Liansheng)

Out:

No.	Pos.	Nation	Player
2	DF	CHN	Wang Wanpeng (to Dalian Aerbin)
8	MF	BRA	Eninho (to (South Korea) Jeonbuk Hyundai Motors)
9	FW	MNE	Fatos Beqiraj (to (Belarus) Dinamo Minsk)
12	DF	CHN	Lü Jianjun (to Henan Jianye)
14	FW	CHN	Cao Tianbao (Released)
17	MF	ARG	Walter Iglesias (to (Greece) Asteras Tripolis)
18	DF	CHN	Li Xiaoting (loan to Harbin Yiteng)
19	FW	CHN	Liu Xiaodong (Released)
21	FW	CHN	Liu Weidong (loan to Chongqing Lifan)
26	FW	CHN	Pan Chaoran (Released)
27	FW	CHN	Yang Xu (loan return to Shandong Luneng)
28	GK	CHN	Mi Tianhe (Released)
30	GK	CHN	Zhou Miao (Released)
31	DF	CHN	Zhao Peng (loan return to Guangzhou Evergrande)
37	MF	CHN	Feng Renliang (loan return to Guangzhou Evergrande)
43	MF	CHN	Xie Zhaoyu (to Dalian Transcendence)
44	DF	CHN	Zhao Haoxiang (Released)
45	MF	CHN	Wang Mingyu (Released)
46	FW	CHN	Wang Si (Released)
47	DF	CHN	Wang Wei (Released)
49	FW	CHN	Wang Yiran (Released)
50	MF	CHN	Ma Jiajun (Released)
51	DF	CHN	He Zitong (Released)
52	MF	CHN	Liu Zefeng (to Anhui Litian)
54	DF	CHN	Yin Zhiqiang (Released)
55	FW	CHN	Li Zhongting (Released)
57	DF	CHN	Liu Qi (Released)
60	FW	CHN	Xiao Yufeng (Released)
-	MF	CHN	Niu Luyuan (to Yinchuan Helanshan)
-	FW	CHN	Cheng Changcheng (Released)
-	MF	CHN	Yang He (to Meizhou Wuhua)

=== Chongqing Lifan ===
In:

No.	Pos.	Nation	Player
8	FW	CHN	Liu Weidong (loan from Changchun Yatai)
10	FW	BRA	Jajá (from (Ukraine) Metalist Kharkiv)
14	DF	MAR	Issam El Adoua (from (Spain) Levante UD)
15	DF	CHN	Sun Jihai (from Guizhou Renhe)
25	MF	CHN	Peng Xinli (loan from Guangzhou Evergrande)
30	DF	CHN	Tan Wangsong (from Henan Jianye)
33	FW	ARG	Emanuel Gigliotti (loan from (Argentina) Boca Juniors)
35	DF	AUS	Adrian Leijer (from (Australia) Melbourne Victory)
36	DF	CHN	Xu Jiale (loan return from Sichuan Longfor)
37	DF	CHN	Liu Juncheng (loan return from Sichuan Longfor)
38	MF	CHN	Zheng Yi (loan return from Sichuan Longfor)
40	DF	CHN	Zhang Xiaolong (loan return from Dalian Transcendence)
46	MF	CHN	Luo Xiaodong (Free Agent)
50	FW	CHN	Wang Zhe (from Sichuan Leaders)

Out:

No.	Pos.	Nation	Player
1	GK	CHN	Li Huayang (to Beijing BIT)
8	MF	BRA	Elias (to (Saudi Arabia) Al-Fateh)
13	DF	CHN	Gan Rui (to Nanjing Qianbao)
14	DF	CHN	Xia Jin (to Guizhou Zhicheng)
15	DF	BRA	Luiz Eduardo (to (Brazil) São Caetano)
25	DF	CHN	Shi Zhe (loan to Qingdao Hainiu)
30	DF	CHN	Han Qingsong (to Qingdao Hainiu)
49	MF	CHN	Chen Mingchao (Released)
53	FW	CHN	Chen Hongzhen (Released)

=== Guangzhou Evergrande Taobao ===
In:

No.	Pos.	Nation	Player
4	MF	CHN	Zhang Jiaqi (from Dalian Aerbin)
7	FW	BRA	Alan (from (Austria) Red Bull Salzburg)
11	MF	BRA	Ricardo Goulart (from (Brazil) Cruzeiro)
12	MF	CHN	Wang Shangyuan (from (Belgium) Club Brugge KV)
15	DF	CHN	Yi Teng (loan return from Liaoning Whowin)
25	MF	CHN	Zou Zheng (from Qingdao Jonoon)
36	DF	CHN	Liu Hao (from Hangzhou Greentown)
37	DF	CHN	Wu Yuduo (from Shenyang Zhongze)
46	DF	CHN	Yang Chaohui (from Guizhou Renhe)
51	FW	CHN	Xu Li'ao (from Guizhou Renhe)
-	DF	CHN	Zhao Peng (loan return from Changchun Yatai)
-	MF	CHN	Feng Renliang (loan return from Changchun Yatai)
-	DF	CHN	Peng Xinli (loan return from Meizhou Wuhua)
-	FW	CHN	Yang Chaosheng (loan return from Liaoning Whowin)
-	DF	CHN	Hu Bowen (loan return from Hangzhou Greentown)
-	DF	CHN	Li Jianbin (loan return from Henan Jianye)
-	MF	CHN	Zhang Xingbo (loan return from Taiyuan Zhongyou Jiayi)
-	FW	CHN	Shewket Yalqun (loan return from Qingdao Hainiu)
-	DF	CHN	Zhang Hongnan (loan return from Qingdao Hainiu)
-	DF	CHN	Li Weixin (loan return from Meizhou Wuhua)
-	FW	CHN	Gao Zhilin (loan return from Meizhou Wuhua)
-	DF	CHN	Tu Dongxu (loan return from Guangdong Sunray Cave)
-	DF	CHN	Gong Liangxuan (loan return from Chengdu Tiancheng)
-	FW	CHN	Ni Bo (loan return from Shenyang Zhongze)
-	FW	CHN	Ye Weichao (loan return from Guangdong Sunray Cave)
-	MF	CHN	Wang Rui (loan return from Qingdao Hainiu)

Out:

No.	Pos.	Nation	Player
4	DF	CHN	Zhao Peng (to Qingdao Jonoon)
7	MF	CHN	Feng Junyan (Retired)
13	GK	CHN	Xu Guangliao (Released)
14	MF	CHN	Feng Renliang (loan to Guizhou Renhe)
21	MF	CHN	Peng Xinli (loan to Chongqing Lifan)
23	MF	ITA	Alessandro Diamanti (loan to (Italy) Fiorentina)
30	FW	CHN	Yang Chaosheng (loan to Liaoning Whowin)
32	DF	CHN	Sun Xiang (to Shanghai SIPG)
34	MF	CHN	Hu Weiwei (to Qingdao Jonoon)
38	FW	ITA	Alberto Gilardino (loan to (Italy) Fiorentina)
39	MF	CHN	Tan Jiajun (Released)
40	DF	CHN	Hu Bowen (loan to Qingdao Hainiu)
43	GK	CHN	Ye Guochen (Released)
44	DF	CHN	Chen Jinchao (Released)
46	DF	CHN	Wang Zihang (Released)
47	DF	CHN	Huang Yabin (Released)
48	DF	CHN	Wang Yifeng (Released)
49	DF	CHN	Liu Ruicheng (Released)
51	MF	CHN	Hu Weilun (Released)
55	MF	CHN	Ren Yiren (Released)
59	DF	CHN	Li Jianbin (to Shanghai Shenhua)
-	MF	CHN	Zhang Xingbo (to Taiyuan Zhongyou Jiayi)
-	FW	CHN	Shewket Yalqun (loan to Xinjiang Tianshan Leopard)
-	DF	CHN	Zhang Hongnan (loan to Shenzhen F.C.)
-	DF	CHN	Li Weixin (to Meixian Hakka)
-	FW	CHN	Gao Zhilin (to Meizhou Wuhua)
-	DF	CHN	Tu Dongxu (to Meizhou Wuhua)
-	FW	CHN	Ye Weichao (Released)

=== Guangzhou R&F ===
In:

No.	Pos.	Nation	Player
3	DF	CHN	Yu Yang (from Beijing Guoan)
4	DF	CHN	Jin Yangyang (from Dalian Aerbin)
6	MF	CHN	Wang Song (from Hangzhou Greentown)
10	MF	ESP	Míchel Herrero (from (Spain) Valencia CF)
13	FW	CHN	Ye Chugui (from Meixian Hakka)
24	FW	CHN	Men Yang (loan return from Yinchuan Helanshan)
27	GK	CHN	Liu Dianzuo (from Shanghai Shenxin)
42	DF	CHN	Zeng Chao (loan return from Guangdong Sunray Cave)
48	FW	CHN	Wen Chao (loan return from Yinchuan Helanshan)
52	GK	CHN	Xing Yu (from Chengdu Tiancheng)
-	MF	CHN	Wu Wei'an (loan return from Guangdong Sunray Cave)
-	DF	CHN	Gao Jiulong (loan return from Nanjing Qianbao)
-	MF	CHN	Liang Yanfeng (loan return from Nanjing Qianbao)

Out:

No.	Pos.	Nation	Player
3	DF	CHN	Liu Cheng (Retired)
6	DF	CHN	Xu Bo (to Shijiazhuang Yongchang)
10	MF	BRA	Davi (to Shanghai SIPG)
13	MF	CHN	Wu Wei'an (to Shenzhen F.C.)
26	MF	CHN	Wu Pingfeng (Retired)
28	DF	CHN	Gao Jiulong (to Nanjing Qianbao)
32	GK	CHN	Wang Lüe (Released)
36	MF	CHN	Zhu Baojie (to Guizhou Renhe)
41	DF	CHN	Zhang Ao (to Hebei CFFC)
52	MF	CHN	Liang Yanfeng (to Fujian Broncos)
53	DF	CHN	Zhao Ming (to Yanbian Changbaishan)
59	MF	CHN	Xu Jiajun (to Hebei CFFC)

=== Guizhou Renhe ===
In:

No.	Pos.	Nation	Player
5	DF	CHN	Liu Yang (from Wuhan Zall)
10	FW	SWE	Magnus Eriksson (from (Sweden) Malmö FF)
11	FW	BRA	Ricardo Santos (from (Sweden) Åtvidabergs FF)
13	FW	CHN	Shi Liang (loan return from Meizhou Wuhua)
19	DF	CHN	Liu Tianqi (loan return from Taiyuan Zhongyou Jiayi)
27	DF	KOR	Park Ju-sung (from (South Korea) Gyeongnam FC)
30	MF	CHN	Feng Renliang (loan from Guangzhou Evergrande)
33	MF	CHN	Zhu Baojie (from Guangzhou R&F)
35	DF	CHN	Tang Yuan (from Guizhou Zhicheng)
-	DF	CHN	He Xi (from Jiangsu Sainty)
-	MF	CHN	Yang Lei (loan return from Lijiang Jiayunhao)
-	MF	CHN	Li Shuai (loan return from Yinchuan Helanshan)
-	DF	CHN	Huang Gengji (loan return from Taiyuan Zhongyou Jiayi)
-	MF	CHN	Zhou Zihao (loan return from Taiyuan Zhongyou Jiayi)
-	MF	CHN	Zhu Zhengyu (loan return from Taiyuan Zhongyou Jiayi)
-	DF	CHN	Yang Fan (loan return from Taiyuan Zhongyou Jiayi)
-	MF	CHN	Zhang Yuxuan (loan return from Taiyuan Zhongyou Jiayi)
-	DF	CHN	Deng Hanwen (loan return from Taiyuan Zhongyou Jiayi)
-	MF	CHN	Ren Chenchao (loan return from Taiyuan Zhongyou Jiayi)
-	FW	CHN	Lei-Lu Dekun (loan return from Taiyuan Zhongyou Jiayi)
-	DF	CHN	Shi Jiwei (loan return from Taiyuan Zhongyou Jiayi)
-	MF	CHN	Luo Andong (loan return from Taiyuan Zhongyou Jiayi)
-	MF	CHN	Hu Hao (loan return from Taiyuan Zhongyou Jiayi)
-	DF	CHN	Meng Chao (loan return from Taiyuan Zhongyou Jiayi)
-	DF	CHN	Li Boyang (loan return from Taiyuan Zhongyou Jiayi)
-	MF	CHN	Liao Linkun (loan return from Taiyuan Zhongyou Jiayi)
-	GK	CHN	Chen Chang (loan return from Taiyuan Zhongyou Jiayi)
-	GK	CHN	Chen Nancun (loan return from Taiyuan Zhongyou Jiayi)
-	FW	CHN	Xu Li'ao (loan return from Taiyuan Zhongyou Jiayi)
-	FW	CHN	Liu Yang (loan return from Taiyuan Zhongyou Jiayi)
-	MF	CHN	Wang Erzhuo (loan return from Sichuan Longfor)

Out:

No.	Pos.	Nation	Player
4	DF	AUS	Jonas Salley (to Hohhot Zhongyou)
8	MF	CHN	Li Chunyu (to Shijiazhuang Yongchang)
10	MF	BIH	Zvjezdan Misimović (Retired)
16	FW	CHN	Wu Dingmao (Released)
17	DF	CHN	Sun Jihai (to Chongqing Lifan)
18	DF	CHN	Zhao Jun (Released)
20	FW	CHN	Zhang Chengxiang (to Tianjin Locomotive)
21	FW	CHN	Yu Hai (to Shanghai SIPG)
24	FW	GER	Mike Hanke (Retired)
28	FW	CHN	Ge Yuxiang (Released)
33	MF	CHN	Guo Sheng (to Nei Mongol Zhongyou)
35	DF	CHN	Wan Houliang (to Qingdao Hainiu)
39	FW	CHN	Chen Zijie (to Hunan Billows)
41	MF	CHN	Yu Bin (Released)
42	MF	CHN	Yu Wenhe (to Nei Mongol Zhongyou)
50	MF	CHN	Tan Liwei (to Tianjin Locomotive)
54	MF	CHN	Huang Hui (Released)
-	MF	CHN	Yang Lei (to Lijiang Jiayunhao)
-	MF	CHN	Li Shuai (to Yinchuan Helanshan)
-	DF	CHN	Huang Gengji (Released)
-	MF	CHN	Zhou Zihao (Released)
-	MF	CHN	Zhu Zhengyu (Released)
-	DF	CHN	Yang Fan (to Nei Mongol Zhongyou)
-	MF	CHN	Zhang Yuxuan (to Nei Mongol Zhongyou)
-	DF	CHN	Deng Hanwen (to Nei Mongol Zhongyou)
-	MF	CHN	Ren Chenchao (to Nei Mongol Zhongyou)
-	FW	CHN	Lei-Lu Dekun (to Nei Mongol Zhongyou)
-	DF	CHN	Shi Jiwei (to Nei Mongol Zhongyou)
-	MF	CHN	Luo Andong (to Nei Mongol Zhongyou)
-	MF	CHN	Hu Hao (to Nei Mongol Zhongyou)
-	DF	CHN	Meng Chao (to Nei Mongol Zhongyou)
-	DF	CHN	Li Boyang (to Nei Mongol Zhongyou)
-	MF	CHN	Liao Linkun (to Nei Mongol Zhongyou)
-	GK	CHN	Chen Chang (to Nei Mongol Zhongyou)
-	GK	CHN	Chen Nancun (to Yunnan Wanhao)
-	FW	CHN	Xu Li'ao (to Guangzhou Evergrande)
-	FW	CHN	Liu Yang (to Tianjin Locomotive)
-	MF	CHN	Wang Erzhuo (to Beijing BIT)
-	DF	CHN	Yang Chaohui (to Guangzhou Evergrande)

=== Hangzhou Greentown ===
In:

No.	Pos.	Nation	Player
3	DF	CHN	Ge Zhen (from Shanghai Shenxin)
7	FW	TUN	Imed Louati (loan from (Tunisia) CS Sfaxien)
9	FW	BRA	Anselmo Ramon (from (Brazil) Cruzeiro)
17	MF	TPE	Chen Po-liang (from Shanghai Shenhua)
20	MF	LBN	Roda Antar (from Jiangsu Sainty)
25	MF	CHN	Huang Xiyang (from Henan Jianye)
26	DF	TUN	Bassem Boulaabi (from (Tunisia) CS Sfaxien)
-	DF	CHN	Sun Zheng'ao (loan return from Beijing BIT)
-	MF	CHN	Yang Zezhi (loan return from Guizhou Zhicheng)
-	DF	CHN	Wang Hongyou (loan return from Dalian Transcendence)
-	FW	GAM	Bubacarr Trawally (from (The Gambia) Banjul)
-	MF	CHN	Wang Zhipeng (loan return from Beijing BIT)
-	GK	CHN	Jiang Bo (loan return from Beijing Baxy)
-	MF	CHN	Tang Jiashu (loan return from Shanghai Shenxin)
-	FW	JPN	Masashi Oguro (loan return from (Japan) Kyoto Sanga)
-	MF	CHN	Niu Xiucheng (loan return from Shenzhen Ruby)

Out:

No.	Pos.	Nation	Player
3	DF	CHN	Sun Zheng'ao (loan to Shenzhen F.C.)
5	DF	CHN	Shi Ke (to Shanghai SIPG)
6	DF	KOR	Son Dae-Ho (to (Thailand) BEC Tero Sasana)
7	FW	BRA	Gilberto Macena (loan to (Thailand) Buriram United)
9	FW	BRA	Anselmo Ramon (loan return to (Brazil) Cruzeiro)
15	DF	CHN	Xiong Wei (Released)
19	DF	CHN	Wu Hang (Released)
26	DF	CHN	Zhang Zhenyu (Released)
30	MF	SVN	Luka Žinko (to (Slovenia) Olimpija)
33	MF	CHN	Wang Song (to Guangzhou R&F)
36	MF	CHN	Yang Zezhi (Released)
37	DF	CHN	Wu Guodong (to Hebei China Fortune)
38	DF	CHN	Hu Bowen (loan return to Guangzhou Evergrande)
43	FW	CHN	Zhang Xiang (loan to Lijiang Jiayunhao)
46	MF	CHN	Liu Heng (loan to Baotou Nanjiao)
47	DF	CHN	Liu Hao (to Guangzhou Evergrande)
48	GK	CHN	Fan Jinming (loan to Lijiang Jiayunhao)
49	DF	CHN	Chen Xiaohan (loan to Baotou Nanjiao)
52	DF	CHN	Wang Hongyou (Released)
53	MF	CHN	Xie Zhiyu (Released)
55	GK	CHN	Gao Sheng (Released)
56	GK	CHN	Peng Hao (Released)
-	FW	GAM	Bubacarr Trawally (loan to Yanbian Changbaishan)
-	MF	CHN	Wang Zhipeng (loan to Yanbian Changbaishan)
-	GK	CHN	Jiang Bo (to Beijing Baxy)
-	MF	CHN	Tang Jiashu (to Beijing Baxy)
-	FW	JPN	Masashi Oguro (to (Japan) Kyoto Sanga)
-	MF	CHN	Niu Xiucheng (Released)

=== Henan Jianye ===
In:

No.	Pos.	Nation	Player
1	GK	CHN	Wu Yan (from Wuhan Zall)
3	DF	CHN	Lü Jianjun (from Changchun Yatai)
4	DF	DEN	Eddi Gomes (from (Denmark) Esbjerg fB)
6	MF	CHN	Li Zhichao (from Beijing BG)
9	FW	PHI	Javier Patiño (from (Thailand) Buriram United)
10	MF	BRA	Ivo (from (South Korea) Incheon United)
11	FW	CHN	Lei Yongchi (from Shenyang Zhongze)
15	DF	KOR	Jung In-whan (from (South Korea) Jeonbuk Hyundai Motors)
17	GK	CHN	Guo Chunquan (from Harbin Yiteng)
20	FW	POL	Mateusz Zachara (from (Poland) Górnik Zabrze)
-	DF	CHN	Ma Chongchong (loan return from Chengdu Tiancheng)
-	MF	CHN	Zi Long (loan return from Nanjing Qianbao)

Out:

No.	Pos.	Nation	Player
1	GK	CHN	Zhou Yajun (Released)
2	DF	CHN	Li Lei (to Beijing Guoan)
3	DF	SLE	Gibril Sankoh (Released)
6	DF	CHN	Tan Wangsong (to Chongqing Lifan)
8	MF	CHN	Zhang Lu (to Shanghai Shenhua)
9	FW	JAM	Ryan Johnson (to (South Korea) Seoul E-Land)
10	MF	CHN	Lu Feng (Released)
11	FW	ANG	Nando Rafael (Released)
14	MF	CHN	Huang Xiyang (to Hangzhou Greentown)
15	MF	CHN	He Bin (Released)
17	DF	KOR	Lee Ji-Nam (to (South Korea) Jeonnam Dragons)
20	FW	BRA	Marques (loan to (Brazil) Palmeiras)
21	DF	CHN	Li Zhaonan (Released)
22	MF	CHN	Zhu Yifan (to Changchun Yatai)
23	DF	CHN	Qiao Wei (Released)
25	DF	CHN	Han Chao (Released)
27	MF	CHN	Zhang Li (loan to Wuhan Zall)
28	MF	CHN	Wang Jia'nan (Released)
34	GK	CHN	Dang Zhao (Released)
36	DF	CHN	Li Jianbin (loan return to Guangzhou Evergrande)
38	MF	CHN	Lin Yuchen (Released)
41	MF	CHN	Liu Jingrui (Released)
44	MF	CHN	Li Yikai (Released)
46	MF	CHN	Wang Shuai (to Jiangxi Liansheng)
49	DF	CHN	Ao Damu (Released)
50	GK	CHN	Cao Ziyi (to Beijing BG)
53	DF	CHN	Jiang Danyang (to Jiangxi Liansheng)
67	MF	CHN	Liu Bo (to Jiangxi Liansheng)
-	DF	CHN	Ma Chongchong (to Jiangxi Liansheng)
-	MF	CHN	Zi Long (to Nanjing Qianbao)

=== Jiangsu Guoxin Sainty ===
In:

No.	Pos.	Nation	Player
6	DF	ISL	Sölvi Ottesen (from (Russia) Ural)
10	FW	ISL	Viðar Örn Kjartansson (from (Norway) Vålerenga)
11	FW	JPN	Sergio Escudero (from (South Korea) FC Seoul)
14	FW	CHN	Qu Cheng (loan return from Jiangxi Liansheng)
16	MF	CRO	Sammir (from (Spain) Getafe CF)
30	GK	CHN	Zhang Sipeng (from Beijing Guoan)
32	FW	CHN	Bari Mamatil (loan return from Xinjiang Tianshan Leopard)
33	FW	CHN	Gu Wenxiang (from Lijiang Jiayunhao)
50	FW	CHN	Ge Wei (loan return from Jiangxi Liansheng)
-	MF	CHN	Yin Lu (loan return from Taiyuan Zhongyou Jiayi)
-	MF	CHN	Tang Miao (loan return from Nanjing Qianbao)
-	MF	CHN	Zhu Chao (loan return from Nanjing Qianbao)

Out:

No.	Pos.	Nation	Player
6	MF	LBN	Roda Antar (to Hangzhou Greentown)
11	FW	BRA	Elias (to (Brazil) Nova Iguaçu)
14	MF	CHN	Yin Lu (to Hohhot Zhongyou)
16	MF	CHN	Deng Zhuoxiang (to Shanghai Shenhua)
18	DF	CHN	Li Chi (Retired)
21	DF	CHN	Miao Ming (to Baoding Yingli Yitong)
25	MF	CHN	Du Yunjie (Released)
26	GK	CHN	Guan Zhen (to Shijiazhuang Ever Bright)
30	DF	KOR	Yoon Sin-Young (to (South Korea) Daejeon Citizen)
33	DF	CHN	Li Haoran (Released)
40	FW	COL	Edinson Toloza (loan to (Colombia) Junior)
54	MF	CHN	Huang Chen (Released)
56	DF	CHN	He Xi (to Guizhou Renhe)
57	MF	CHN	Zhang Jiangyi (to Shanghai Shenhua)
66	DF	CHN	Liu Zihao (to Shandong Luneng)
-	MF	CHN	Tang Miao (loan to Nanjing Qianbao)
-	MF	CHN	Zhu Chao (to Nanjing Qianbao)

=== Liaoning Whowin ===
In:

No.	Pos.	Nation	Player
10	FW	CIV	Franck Boli (from (Norway) Stabæk Fotball)
16	FW	CHN	Yang Chaosheng (loan from Guangzhou Evergrande)
21	DF	CHN	Yang Yun (loan from Beijing Guoan)
26	MF	CHN	Qin Sheng (from Meizhou Kejia)
30	DF	KOR	Kim Yoo-jin (from (Thailand) Bangkok United)
31	DF	HKG	Fofo (from (Hong Kong) Sun Pegasus)
37	MF	CHN	Zheng Zhihao (from Dalian Transcendence)
50	MF	CHN	Zhao Cangjian (from Shenyang Zhongze)
52	DF	CHN	Yu Zhen (Free Agent)
-	MF	CHN	Zhang Xiaoyu (loan return from Nanjing Qianbao)
-	MF	CHN	Hao Yonghe (loan return from Shenyang Zhongze)
-	GK	CHN	Cui Kai (loan return from Shenyang Dongjin)
-	GK	CHN	Zhu Zilin (loan return from Taiyuan Zhongyou Jiayi)
-	DF	CHN	Du Wenyang (loan return from Dalian Transcendence)
-	MF	CHN	Tao Siyu (loan return from Fujian Broncos)
-	MF	CHN	Liu Tiankuo (loan return from Fujian Broncos)

Out:

No.	Pos.	Nation	Player
10	FW	BEL	Kevin Oris (to (South Korea) Incheon United)
18	DF	CHN	Yi Teng (loan return to Guangzhou Evergrande)
19	MF	CHN	Qu Xiaohui (Released)
21	FW	SRB	Aleksandar Jevtić (Released)
22	MF	CHN	Wang Liang (Released)
24	DF	CHN	Tian Runze (Released)
26	FW	CHN	Yang Chaosheng (loan return to Guangzhou Evergrande)
31	FW	CHN	Ji Chao (Released)
35	MF	CHN	Jiang Peng (Released)
36	GK	CHN	Shi Xiaotian (loan to Beijing Guoan)
50	DF	CHN	Wang Weipu (to Hebei Elite)
52	MF	CHN	Cao Jiahong (Released)
56	MF	CHN	Gao Jian (Released)
58	MF	CHN	Zhang Xiaoyu (Released)
-	MF	CHN	Hao Yonghe (Released)
-	GK	CHN	Cui Kai (Released)
-	GK	CHN	Zhu Zilin (to Hohhot Zhongyou)
-	DF	CHN	Du Wenyang (to Hebei China Fortune)
-	MF	CHN	Tao Siyu (Released)
-	MF	CHN	Liu Tiankuo (to Fujian Broncos)
-	DF	CHN	He Huan (to Shanghai Shenhua)
-	FW	CHN	Le Xiong (to Shanghai Shenxin)

=== Shandong Luneng Taishan ===
In:

No.	Pos.	Nation	Player
9	FW	BRA	Diego Tardelli (from (Brazil) Atlético)
19	FW	CHN	Yang Xu (loan return from Changchun Yatai)
28	GK	CHN	Zhou Yuchen (loan return from (Portugal) SG Sacavenense)
36	MF	CHN	Cui Peng (loan return from Chengdu Tiancheng)
-	DF	CHN	Liu Zihao (from Jiangsu Sainty)
-	MF	CHN	Luo Senwen (loan return from Chengdu Tiancheng)
-	DF	CHN	Otkur Hasan (loan return from Hebei CFFC)
-	GK	CHN	Geng Xiaofeng (loan return from Shanghai Shenhua)
-	MF	CHN	Ma Long (loan return from Qingdao Hainiu)

Out:

No.	Pos.	Nation	Player
1	GK	CHN	Yang Cheng (to Hebei CFFC)
3	DF	CHN	Du Wei (to Hebei CFFC)
4	DF	AUS	Ryan McGowan (to (Scotland) Dundee United)
10	FW	BRA	Vágner Love (to (Brazil) Corinthians)
14	DF	CHN	Mi Haolun (loan to Shijiazhuang Ever Bright)
20	FW	CHN	Wang Gang (to (Portugal) SG Sacavenense)
24	FW	CHN	Lü Zheng (to Shanghai Shenhua)
27	MF	CHN	Luo Senwen (loan to Hebei CFFC)
38	FW	CHN	Chen Hao (loan to Shanghai Shenxin)
46	DF	CHN	Wu Haoran (to Shijiazhuang Ever Bright)
-	DF	CHN	Otkur Hasan (to Hebei CFFC)
-	GK	CHN	Geng Xiaofeng (to Shanghai Shenhua)
-	MF	CHN	Ma Long (to Qingdao Hainiu)
-	MF	CHN	Du Yuxin (to Dalian Aerbin)

=== Shanghai Greenland Shenhua ===
In:

No.	Pos.	Nation	Player
1	GK	CHN	Geng Xiaofeng (from Shandong Luneng)
2	DF	CHN	Xiong Fei (loan return from Wuhan Zall)
3	DF	CHN	Li Jianbin (from Guangzhou Evergrande)
4	DF	GRE	Avraam Papadopoulos (from (Turkey) Trabzonspor)
8	MF	CHN	Zhang Lu (from Henan Jianye)
11	FW	CHN	Lü Zheng (from Shandong Luneng)
13	DF	ZAM	Stoppila Sunzu (from (France) Sochaux)
17	FW	AUS	Tim Cahill (from (United States) New York Red Bulls)
20	MF	CHN	Wang Yun (from Shanghai Shenxin)
24	MF	CHN	Deng Zhuoxiang (from Jiangsu Sainty)
35	GK	CHN	Bai Shuo (from Tianjin Songjiang)
39	DF	CHN	Zhang Zongzheng (Free Agent)
52	DF	CHN	Luo Xi (loan return from Beijing Baxy)
-	DF	CHN	Zhang Jiangyi (from Jiangsu Sainty)
-	DF	CHN	He Huan (from Liaoning Whowin)
-	DF	CHN	Cui Qi (loan return from Tianjin Locomotive)
-	FW	CHN	Wang Junchao (loan return from Yunnan Wanhao)
-	DF	CHN	Liu Bin (loan return from Beijing Baxy)

Out:

No.	Pos.	Nation	Player
1	GK	CHN	Geng Xiaofeng (loan return to Shandong Luneng)
3	DF	HKG	Brian Fok (loan to (Spain) CF Crack's)
5	DF	KOR	Cho Byung-Kuk (to (Thailand) Chonburi F.C.)
13	DF	BRA	Paulo André (to (Brazil) Cruzeiro)
14	DF	CHN	Gu Bin (Released)
17	MF	TPE	Chen Po-liang (to Hangzhou Greentown)
20	MF	CHN	Xu Liang (Retired)
23	DF	CHN	Liu Jiashen (to Qingdao Hainiu)
24	GK	CHN	Shen Jun (loan to (Spain) CF Crack's)
29	DF	CHN	Yuan Shaohua (Released)
34	FW	ARG	Lucas Viatri (loan to (Argentina) Banfield)
42	GK	CHN	Dong Hang (Released)
51	MF	CHN	Huang Linhao (Released)
55	MF	CHN	Yang Haofeng (Released)
56	DF	CHN	Cui Qi (Released)
58	FW	CHN	Wang Junchao (to Yunnan Wanhao)
59	MF	CHN	Chen Tao (loan to (Spain) CF Crack's)
60	MF	CHN	Shang Yin (Released)
-	DF	CHN	Liu Bin (to Beijing BG)
-	DF	CHN	Huang Bowen (loan to (Spain) CF Crack's)
-	DF	CHN	Li Xiaoming (loan to (Spain) CF Crack's)
-	DF	CHN	Leng Shiao (loan to (Spain) CF Crack's)
-	DF	CHN	Cao Chuanyu (loan to (Spain) CF Crack's)
-	MF	CHN	Xu Jun (loan to (Spain) CF Crack's)
-	FW	CHN	Xu Junmin (loan to (Spain) CF Crack's)
-	MF	CHN	Yan Xinyu (loan to (Spain) CF Crack's)
-	DF	CHN	Xu Yougang (loan to (Spain) CF Crack's)
-	FW	CHN	Zhou Jiahao (loan to (Spain) CF Crack's)
-	MF	CHN	Lü Pin (loan to (Spain) CF Crack's)
-	MF	CHN	Chen Qiyuan (loan to (Spain) CF Crack's)
-	FW	CHN	Gao Shipeng (loan to (Spain) CF Crack's)
-	GK	CHN	Zhu Yueqi (loan to (Spain) CF Crack's)
-	DF	CHN	Deng Biao (loan to (Spain) CF Crack's)

=== Shanghai Shenxin ===
In:

No.	Pos.	Nation	Player
4	DF	CHN	Liao Chengjian (loan return from Shijiazhuang Yongchang)
8	MF	CHN	Chi Zhongguo (from Yanbian Changbaishan)
10	FW	BRA	Zé Eduardo (from (Italy) Genoa C.F.C.)
14	GK	CHN	Zhang Yi'nuo (from Chengdu Tiancheng)
25	GK	CHN	Zhang Xunwei (from Shenzhen Ruby)
27	FW	NGA	Daniel Chima (from (Norway) Molde FK)
28	FW	CHN	Chen Hao (loan from Shandong Luneng)
29	DF	CHN	Huang Wei (from (Portugal) S.C. Farense)
31	MF	CHN	Cui Ren (from Yanbian Changbaishan)
43	FW	CHN	Le Xiong (from Liaoning Whowin)
69	MF	CHN	Chi Zhongjie (from Yanbian Changbaishan)
78	GK	CHN	Tang Chaoshuang (from Shenyang Zhongze)
-	DF	CHN	Zhao Zuojun (loan return from Nei Mongol Zhongyou)

Out:

No.	Pos.	Nation	Player
3	DF	CHN	Zhao Zuojun (to Nei Mongol Zhongyou)
5	MF	CHN	Tang Jiashu (loan return to Hangzhou Greentown)
7	DF	CHN	Xu Wen (Released)
8	FW	BRA	Jaílton Paraíba (to Yanbian Changbaishan)
9	MF	CHN	Zhu Jiawei (Released)
18	DF	CHN	Ge Zhen (to Hangzhou Greentown)
20	MF	CHN	Wang Yun (to Shanghai Shenhua)
22	GK	CHN	Zhu Jianmin (Released)
25	GK	CHN	Liu Dianzuo (to Guangzhou R&F)
29	FW	CHN	Jiang Xiaochen (Released)
31	FW	CHN	Liu Wenxi (Released)
35	FW	NGA	Peter Utaka (loan return to Beijing Guoan)
37	MF	CHN	Wang Bo (Released)
43	DF	CHN	Zhu Zhiling (Released)
44	DF	CHN	Wu Junxin (Released)
47	GK	CHN	Li Yangxin (to Guangxi Longguida)
50	DF	CHN	Pu Hongyuan (Released)
51	MF	CHN	Liu Wenzhi (Released)
57	DF	CHN	Zheng Guangqi (Released)
70	FW	CHN	Chen Yu (loan to Lijiang Jiayunhao)

=== Shanghai SIPG ===
In:

No.	Pos.	Nation	Player
3	DF	KOR	Kim Ju-young (from (South Korea) FC Seoul)
8	MF	BRA	Davi (from Guangzhou R&F)
10	MF	ARG	Darío Conca (from (Brazil) Fluminense)
17	FW	CIV	Jean Evrard Kouassi (from (Croatia) Hajduk Split)
21	FW	CHN	Yu Hai (from Guizhou Renhe)
27	DF	CHN	Shi Ke (from Hangzhou Greentown)
32	DF	CHN	Sun Xiang (from Guangzhou Evergrande)
33	DF	CHN	Yang Boyu (from Dalian Aerbin)
37	FW	CHN	Mao Jiakang (loan return from Hunan Billows)

Out:

No.	Pos.	Nation	Player
19	FW	SWE	Imad Khalili (to (United Arab Emirates) Baniyas F.C.)
21	DF	ESP	Ibán Cuadrado (to Guizhou Zhicheng)
25	DF	GHA	Ransford Addo (to Wuhan Zall)
36	FW	AUS	Daniel McBreen (to (Hong Kong) South China)

=== Shijiazhuang Ever Bright ===
In:

No.	Pos.	Nation	Player
6	MF	CHN	Li Chunyu (from Guizhou Renhe)
7	FW	CHN	Mao Jianqing (from Beijing Guoan)
9	FW	VEN	Mario Rondón (from (Portugal) C.D. Nacional)
14	DF	KOR	Cho Yong-hyung (from (Qatar) Al-Shamal)
16	DF	BRA	Rodrigo Defendi (from (Portugal) Vitória S.C.)
18	DF	CHN	Xu Bo (from Guangzhou R&F)
19	FW	ZAM	Jacob Mulenga (from (Turkey) Adana Demirspor)
22	GK	CHN	Guan Zhen (from Jiangsu Sainty)
25	DF	CHN	Mi Haolun (loan from Shandong Luneng)
31	MF	CHN	Chen-Zeng Tailang (from (Portugal) C.D. Mafra)
32	DF	CHN	Wu Haoran (from Shandong Luneng)
46	DF	CHN	Niu Xinyu (from Chengdu Tiancheng)

Out:

No.	Pos.	Nation	Player
7	FW	CHN	Yu Liang (Released)
9	FW	BRA	Carlão (Released)
10	FW	CHN	Xu Bo (to Jiangxi Liansheng)
18	MF	CHN	Tian Riliang (Released)
19	DF	CHN	Sun Xiaolin (Released)
22	FW	CHN	Zhang Hao (to Hebei Elite)
24	MF	CHN	Yin Xiaolong (Released)
25	DF	CHN	Liao Chengjian (loan return to Shanghai Shenxin)
32	MF	CHN	Yin Liangyi (to Baotou Nanjiao)
33	MF	BUL	Emil Gargorov (to (Bulgaria) Lokomotiv Sofia)
42	MF	CHN	Liu Ziming (to (Portugal) CCD Santa Eulália)
48	MF	CHN	An Shuo (to (Portugal) CCD Santa Eulália)
49	DF	CHN	Zhao Chengle (to (Portugal) FC Felgueiras 1932)
50	FW	CHN	Zhang Sen (to Baoding Yingli Yitong)
51	MF	CHN	Chen Lei (Released)

=== Tianjin Teda ===
In:

No.	Pos.	Nation	Player
2	DF	CHN	Yang Zexiang (loan return from Tianjin Huaruide)
3	DF	IRN	Morteza Pouraliganji (from (Iran) Naft Tehran)
4	DF	BRA	Lucas Fonseca (from (Brazil) Bahia)
9	FW	ARG	Hernán Barcos (from (Brazil) Grêmio)
16	MF	CHN	Sang Yifei (from Wuhan Zall)
24	FW	COL	Wilmar Jordán (from (Bulgaria) Litex Lovech)
26	DF	CHN	Zhao Honglüe (from Dalian Aerbin)
27	FW	CHN	Fan Zhiqiang (loan return from Dalian Transcendence)
28	FW	CHN	Fan Baiqun (loan return from Tianjin Songjiang)

Out:

No.	Pos.	Nation	Player
2	DF	CHN	He Yang (to Qingdao Jonoon)
3	DF	BRA	Éder Lima (to Beijing BG)
4	MF	CHN	Du Zhenyu (to Changchun Yatai)
9	FW	BRA	Baré (Released)
14	FW	COL	Carmelo Valencia (to Beijing BG)
16	DF	LBN	Mohammed Ali Khan (to (Sweden) Halmstads BK)
22	MF	CHN	Chu Jinzhao (to Tianjin Songjiang)
-	DF	CHN	Mao Kaiyu (to Hohhot Zhongyou)
-	GK	CHN	Lu Zheyu (loan to Baotou Nanjiao)
-	MF	CHN	Jia Yudong (to Yinchuan Helanshan)
-	MF	CHN	Wang Lei (Released)
-	FW	CHN	Li Zhibin (Released)
-	DF	CHN	Song Xicun (Released)
-	DF	CHN	Zhang Wu (Released)
-	DF	CHN	Xie Hongyan (Released)
-	MF	CHN	Han Chao (Released)
-	DF	CHN	Fan Yifu (Released)
-	FW	CHN	Gu Yufei (Released)
-	FW	CHN	Yang Xiaole (Released)
-	MF	CHN	Li Yaoyue (Released)
-	MF	CHN	Jia Yudong (Released)

== League One ==
=== Beijing BG ===
In:

No.	Pos.	Nation	Player
2	DF	CHN	Liu Bin (from Shanghai Shenhua)
3	DF	BRA	Éder Lima (from Tianjin Teda)
5	DF	CHN	Tang Jiashu (from Hangzhou Greentown)
9	FW	COL	Carmelo Valencia (from Tianjin Teda)
17	DF	CHN	Xu Dong (from Harbin Yiteng)
20	MF	CHN	Chen Shuo (from Jiangxi Liansheng)
22	GK	CHN	Jiang Bo (from Hangzhou Greentown)
27	FW	SRB	Danko Lazović (from (Serbia) FK Partizan)
29	MF	CHN	Lü Peng (from Dalian Aerbin)
31	MF	CHN	Yan Xiangchuang (from Harbin Yiteng)
45	GK	CHN	Cao Ziyi (from Henan Jianye)

Out:

No.	Pos.	Nation	Player
4	DF	CHN	Luo Xi (loan return to Shanghai Shenhua)
5	DF	ROU	Lucian Goian (to (Romania) FC Brașov)
6	MF	CHN	Li Zhichao (to Henan Jianye)
10	FW	BRA	Felipe Ferro (to Xinjiang Tianshan Leopard)
19	FW	CHN	Hu Qiling (Released)
22	GK	CHN	Jiang Bo (loan return to Hangzhou Greentown)
30	DF	CHN	Liu Bin (loan return to Shanghai Shenhua)
40	FW	BIH	Ivan Božić (to (Kazakhstan) FC Ordabasy)

=== Beijing BIT ===
In:

No.	Pos.	Nation	Player
3	DF	CHN	Hao Qiang (Free Agent)
9	FW	URU	Andrés Márquez (from Hebei Zhongji)
11	MF	CHN	Xu Wu (from Beijing Guoan)
15	MF	CHN	Wang Erzhuo (from Guizhou Renhe)
21	GK	CHN	Li Huayang (from Chongqing Lifan)

Out:

No.	Pos.	Nation	Player
4	DF	CHN	Lu Bin (Released)
11	DF	CHN	Li Xiang (to Hunan Billows)
12	FW	CHN	Jiang Sheng (to Xinjiang Tianshan Leopard)
15	DF	CHN	Sun Zheng'ao (loan return to Hangzhou Greentown)
21	MF	CHN	Wang Zhipeng (loan return to Hangzhou Greentown)
30	FW	URU	Martín Colombo (to (Argentina) Deportivo Madryn)
48	FW	CHN	Tian Sihao (Released)

=== Dalian Aerbin ===
In:

No.	Pos.	Nation	Player
2	DF	CHN	Wang Wanpeng (from Changchun Yatai)
5	DF	CHN	Zou You (from Chengdu Tiancheng)
8	DF	CHN	Zhu Ting (from Wuhan Zall)
9	FW	SWE	Mathias Ranégie (loan from (England) Watford F.C.)
19	GK	CHN	Yu Ziqian (from Qingdao Hainiu)
20	MF	CHN	Du Yuxin (from Shandong Luneng)

Out:

No.	Pos.	Nation	Player
2	DF	CHN	Yang Boyu (to Shanghai SIPG)
5	DF	CHN	Jin Pengxiang (to Beijing Guoan)
7	DF	CHN	Zhao Honglüe (to Tianjin Teda)
8	MF	CHN	Lü Peng (to Beijing BG)
16	FW	CHN	Nan Yunqi (loan to Dalian Transcendence)
17	MF	CHN	Quan Heng (to Dalian Transcendence)
22	FW	CHN	Yu Dabao (to Beijing Guoan)
24	DF	CHN	Ji Zhengyu (loan to Dalian Transcendence)
35	FW	ARG	Esteban Solari (to (Greece) Ergotelis F.C.)
39	MF	CHN	Zhang Jiaqi (to Guangzhou Evergrande)
41	GK	CHN	Li Shengchen (Released)
49	MF	CHN	Che Shiwei (to Hebei China Fortune)
50	MF	CHN	Wang Xudong (Released)
51	DF	CHN	Li Zhiyu (Released)
52	DF	CHN	Chen Zheng (to Guangxi Longguida)
53	DF	CHN	Wang Zihao (to Anhui Litian)
54	MF	CHN	Wang Shixin (Released)
55	DF	CHN	Tang Chuanshun (to Meixian Hakka)
59	DF	CHN	Jin Yangyang (to Guangzhou R&F)
61	DF	CHN	Qu Jiachen (Released)

=== Guizhou Zhicheng ===
In:

No.	Pos.	Nation	Player
2	DF	CHN	Xia Jin (from Chongqing Lifan)
8	DF	CHN	Zhang Zhi (from Xinjiang Tianshan Leopard)
9	DF	CMR	Yves Ekwalla Herman (from Qingdao Hainiu)
19	MF	CHN	Du Shaobin (from Tianjin Songjiang)
23	DF	ESP	Ibán Cuadrado (from Shanghai SIPG)
33	FW	BRA	Rodrigo (from Harbin Yiteng)
34	MF	CHN	Pang Zhiquan (from Qingdao Jonoon)
-	FW	CHN	Wang Zhi (loan return from Fujian Broncos)

Out:

No.	Pos.	Nation	Player
2	FW	CHN	Xu Depeng (Released)
4	MF	CHN	Yang Zezhi (loan return to Hangzhou Greentown)
7	FW	CHN	Wang Zhi (to Fujian Broncos)
8	MF	CHN	Fang Li (Released)
9	DF	CHN	Zhou Yi (Released)
16	GK	CHN	Wang Zhuo (Released)
19	DF	CHN	Chen Hao (Released)
23	DF	CHN	Tang Yuan (to Guizhou Renhe)
29	MF	CHN	Liu Ji (Released)
32	MF	CHN	Chen Shujian (Released)
33	MF	CHN	Cai Chuchuan (loan return to Tianjin Songjiang)
34	MF	CHN	Pang Zhiquan (loan return to Qingdao Jonoon)
35	DF	CHN	Ming Haohe (Released)

=== Harbin Yiteng ===
In:

No.	Pos.	Nation	Player
1	GK	CHN	Bai Xiaolei (from Beijing Guoan)
3	DF	CHN	Liu Yi (from Shenyang Dongjin)
4	DF	CHN	Zhang Song (Free Agent)
14	DF	HKG	Liu Quankun (Free Agent)
18	DF	CHN	Li Xiaoting (loan from Changchun Yatai)
23	FW	COL	Jair Reinoso (from (Chile) Cobreloa)
28	MF	CHN	Piao Taoyu (Free Agent)
45	MF	CHN	Ai Zhipeng (from Shenyang Dongjin)
46	MF	CHN	Liu Yue (from Shenyang Dongjin)
47	MF	CHN	Wu Chen (from Shenyang Dongjin)
-	MF	CHN	Xian Tao (loan return from Jiangxi Liansheng)

Out:

No.	Pos.	Nation	Player
1	GK	CHN	Guo Chunquan (to Henan Jianye)
4	DF	HKG	Fofo (to (Hong Kong) Sun Pegasus)
10	FW	BRA	Dori (loan return to (Brazil) Fluminense FC)
14	DF	CHN	Shao Shuai (to Changchun Yatai)
17	DF	CHN	Xu Dong (to Beijing BG)
20	MF	CHN	Han Deming (to Changchun Yatai)
29	GK	CHN	Han Fangteng (to Inner Mongolia Zhongyou)
33	FW	BRA	Rodrigo (to Guizhou Zhicheng)
34	MF	CHN	Zhang Feihu (Retired)
36	MF	KOR	Choi Hyun-yeon (to (Malaysia) Kuala Lumpur FA)
39	MF	CHN	Yan Xiangchuang (to Beijing BG)
52	DF	CHN	Shao Yu (Released)
-	MF	CHN	Xian Tao (to Jiangxi Liansheng)

=== Hebei Zhongji ===
In:

No.	Pos.	Nation	Player
2	DF	CHN	Du Wenyang (from Liaoning Whowin)
3	DF	CHN	Otkur Hasan (from Shandong Luneng)
5	DF	CHN	Du Wei (from Shandong Luneng)
6	MF	CHN	Luo Senwen (loan from Shandong Luneng)
9	FW	NOR	Abdurahim Laajab (from (Norway) FK Bodø/Glimt)
10	MF	SRB	Nenad Milijaš (from (Turkey) Manisaspor)
11	MF	CHN	Song Wenjie (from Qingdao Jonoon)
16	DF	CHN	Liao Junjian (from Guangdong Sunray Cave)
19	GK	CHN	Yang Cheng (from Shandong Luneng)
28	DF	CHN	Wu Guodong (from Hangzhou Greentown)
32	MF	SRB	Miroslav Radović (from (Poland) Legia Warsaw)
35	MF	CHN	Che Shiwei (from Dalian Aerbin)
46	MF	CHN	Xu Jiajun (from Guangzhou R&F)
47	FW	CHN	Zhong Jiajie (from Guangdong Sunray Cave)
48	DF	CHN	Zhong Juzhan (from Guangdong Sunray Cave)
49	DF	CHN	Jiang Wenjun (from Qingdao Hainiu)
50	MF	CHN	Wang Xiaolong (from Lijiang Jiayunhao)
51	DF	CHN	Zhang Ao (from Guangzhou R&F)

Out:

No.	Pos.	Nation	Player
2	DF	URU	Andrés Fernández (to (Guatemala) Municipal)
3	DF	CHN	Otkur Hasan (loan return to Shandong Luneng)
5	DF	CHN	Wang Xiang (to Hebei Elite)
7	FW	URU	Andrés Márquez (to Beijing BIT)
10	FW	CHN	Du Wenhui (Released)
12	GK	CHN	Han Zhen (to Hebei Elite)
16	DF	CHN	Li Xin (Released)
21	MF	CHN	Mu Yutan (Released)
29	FW	CHN	Dong Fangzhuo (Released)
35	FW	CHN	Yang Baoming (Released)
39	FW	ANG	Givestin N'Suki (Released)
62	DF	CHN	Zhang Nan (Released)

=== Hunan Billows ===
In:

No.	Pos.	Nation	Player
7	FW	CHN	Chen Zijie (from Guizhou Renhe)
8	MF	CHN	Yang Ke (Free Agent)
10	FW	MNE	Igor Burzanović (from (Kazakhstan) Irtysh Pavlodar)
11	FW	CHN	Li Xiang (from Beijing BIT)
17	GK	CHN	Wang Peng (Free Agent)
25	MF	CHN	Liu Chao (from Shenyang Zhongze)
26	MF	TPE	Chen Chao-An (Free Agent)
33	DF	CHN	Yao Jiangshan (from Qingdao Jonoon)
41	MF	TPE	Wu Chun-ching (Free Agent)
42	MF	TPE	Chen Wei-Chuan (Free Agent)
45	FW	CHN	Xue Yuan (loan return from Lijiang Jiayunhao)

Out:

No.	Pos.	Nation	Player
7	MF	CHN	Wang Qing (to Nanjing Qianbao)
8	DF	CHN	Liu Bo (Released)
10	FW	SRB	Jovan Damjanović (Released)
11	FW	CHN	Mao Jiakang (loan return to Shanghai SIPG)
17	GK	CHN	Wang Haoyi (Released)
24	MF	CHN	Wang Lichun (Released)
26	DF	HKG	Andy Nägelein (to (Hong Kong) Eastern)
29	FW	CHN	Cheng Peng (to Anhui Litian)
44	MF	CHN	Kang Chenxi (Released)
62	FW	CHN	Sheng Chunlin (Released)
63	MF	CHN	Li Tianchen (Released)
64	GK	CHN	Zhai Bin (Released)

=== Jiangxi Liansheng ===
In:

No.	Pos.	Nation	Player
3	DF	BRA	Demerson (from (Brazil) Bahia)
4	DF	CHN	Guo Zichao (from Guangdong Sunray Cave)
7	FW	BRA	Adi Rocha (from (Lithuania) VMFD Žalgiris)
10	MF	CHN	Xian Tao (from Harbin Yiteng)
14	DF	CHN	Ma Chongchong (from Henan Jianye)
16	MF	BRA	Jajá (from (Portugal) Atlético CP)
20	GK	CHN	Wang Min (from Wuhan Zall)
21	MF	CHN	Xu Bo (from Shijiazhuang Ever Bright)
29	MF	CHN	Wang Shuai (from Henan Jianye)
32	FW	CHN	Li Jiaxing (from Qingdao Hainiu)
35	FW	CHN	Zhang Zhichao (from Chengdu Tiancheng)
41	MF	CHN	Liu Bo (from Henan Jianye)
42	DF	CHN	Jiang Danyang (from Henan Jianye)
43	DF	CHN	Wang Lingtai (from Yunnan Wanhao)

Out:

No.	Pos.	Nation	Player
10	MF	CHN	Wang Yunlong (loan return to Wuhan Zall)
16	MF	CHN	Yang He (loan return to Changchun Yatai)
18	FW	CHN	Ge Wei (loan return to Jiangsu Guoxin Sainty)
20	MF	CHN	Sun Wujun (Released)
21	MF	CHN	Cao Bin (Released)
24	MF	CHN	Chen Liansheng (loan return to Changchun Yatai)
27	MF	CHN	Chen Shuo (to Beijing BG)
29	MF	CHN	Xian Tao (loan return to Harbin Yiteng)
30	FW	CHN	Qu Cheng (loan return to Jiangsu Guoxin Sainty)
32	DF	CHN	Jiang Weipeng (loan return to Tianjin Teda)
33	DF	CHN	Xiong Tao (Released)
36	GK	CHN	Zhou Xinglong (Released)
39	MF	CHN	Fan Qunxiao (Released)

=== Nei Monggol Zhongyou ===
In:

No.	Pos.	Nation	Player
1	GK	CHN	Han Fangteng (from Harbin Yiteng)
3	DF	CHN	Zhao Zuojun (from Shanghai Shenxin)
5	DF	CHN	Shi Jiwei (from Guizhou Renhe)
6	DF	CHN	Jiao Zhe (from Qingdao Jonoon)
7	MF	CHN	Wang Yunlong (from Wuhan Zall)
9	FW	BRA	William Paulista (from (Brazil) Sampaio Corrêa)
10	FW	BRA	Dori (loan from (Brazil) Fluminense FC)
11	MF	CHN	Zhang Xingbo (from Guangzhou Evergrande)
12	MF	CHN	Hu Hao (from Guizhou Renhe)
13	FW	CHN	Lei-Lu Dekun (from Guizhou Renhe)
14	MF	CHN	Yu Wenhe (from Guizhou Renhe)
16	GK	CHN	Zhu Zilin (from Liaoning Whowin)
19	MF	CHN	Luo Andong (from Guizhou Renhe)
22	GK	CHN	Chen Chang (from Guizhou Renhe)
23	MF	CHN	Yin Lu (from Jiangsu Guoxin Sainty)
24	MF	CHN	Zhang Yuxuan (from Guizhou Renhe)
25	DF	CHN	Deng Hanwen (from Guizhou Renhe)
29	DF	CHN	Li Boyang (from Guizhou Renhe)
30	DF	AUS	Jonas Salley (from Guizhou Renhe)
32	DF	CHN	Mao Kaiyu (from Tianjin Teda)
35	MF	CHN	Guo Sheng (from Guizhou Renhe)
41	DF	CHN	Meng Chao (from Guizhou Renhe)
42	MF	CHN	Ren Chenchao (from Guizhou Renhe)
43	DF	CHN	Yang Fan (from Guizhou Renhe)
45	MF	CHN	Li Yuhang (Free Agent)
46	FW	CHN	Bian Feng (from Shandong Tengding)

Out:

No.	Pos.	Nation	Player
3	DF	CHN	Zhao Zuojun (loan return to Shanghai Shenxin)
5	DF	CHN	Shi Jiwei (loan return to Guizhou Renhe)
6	MF	CHN	Hu Hao (loan return to Guizhou Renhe)
8	MF	CHN	Zhu Zhengyu (loan return to Guizhou Renhe)
9	MF	CHN	Luo Andong (loan return to Guizhou Renhe)
11	MF	CHN	Zhang Xingbo (loan return to Guangzhou Evergrande)
13	FW	CHN	Lei-Lu Dekun (loan return to Guizhou Renhe)
15	DF	CHN	Huang Gengji (loan return to Guizhou Renhe)
16	GK	CHN	Zhu Zilin (loan return to Liaoning Whowin)
17	MF	CHN	Zhou Zihao (loan return to Guizhou Renhe)
19	DF	CHN	Liu Tianqi (loan return to Guizhou Renhe)
20	MF	CHN	Yin Lu (loan return to Jiangsu Guoxin Sainty)
21	MF	CHN	Ren Chenchao (loan return to Guizhou Renhe)
23	FW	CHN	Xu Li'ao (loan return to Guizhou Renhe)
24	MF	CHN	Zhang Yuxuan (loan return to Guizhou Renhe)
25	DF	CHN	Deng Hanwen (loan return to Guizhou Renhe)
26	DF	CHN	Meng Chao (loan return to Guizhou Renhe)
27	DF	CHN	Yang Fan (loan return to Guizhou Renhe)
28	DF	CHN	Jiao Zhe (loan return to Qingdao Jonoon)
29	DF	CHN	Li Boyang (loan return to Guizhou Renhe)
30	FW	CHN	Liu Yang (loan return to Guizhou Renhe)
32	GK	CHN	Chen Nancun (loan return to Guizhou Renhe)
33	GK	CHN	Chen Chang (loan return to Guizhou Renhe)
39	MF	CHN	Song Lihui (Retired)

=== Qingdao Hainiu ===
In:

No.	Pos.	Nation	Player
5	DF	CHN	Wan Houliang (from Guizhou Renhe)
6	DF	CHN	Han Qingsong (from Chongqing Lifan)
7	FW	KOR	Kim Seung-yong (from (Australia) Central Coast Mariners)
8	MF	SRB	Goran Gogić (from (Serbia) Red Star Belgrade)
9	FW	SRB	Đorđe Rakić (from (Serbia) Red Star Belgrade)
16	MF	CHN	Gao Xiang (from Chengdu Tiancheng)
17	DF	CHN	Shi Zhe (loan from Chongqing Lifan)
19	DF	CHN	Jiang Tao (Free Agent)
21	DF	CHN	Hu Bowen (loan from Guangzhou Evergrande)
27	MF	CHN	Ma Long (from Shandong Luneng)
44	FW	CHN	Bu Nan (from Yanbian Changbaishan)
45	DF	CHN	Liu Jiashen (from Shanghai Shenhua)
46	MF	CHN	Dan Yiming (from Sichuan Longfor)
47	MF	CHN	Chen Zhuo (from Sichuan Longfor)
48	DF	CHN	Jiang Bin (from Yanbian Changbaishan)

Out:

No.	Pos.	Nation	Player
1	GK	CHN	Yu Ziqian (to Dalian Aerbin)
5	DF	CHN	Jiang Wenjun (to Hebei CFFC)
6	DF	CMR	Yves Ekwalla Herman (to Guizhou Zhicheng)
7	MF	CHN	Yu Guijun (Released)
8	MF	CHN	Wang Xuanhong (Released)
9	FW	EST	Vladimir Voskoboinikov (loan return to (Estonia) Nõmme Kalju)
15	DF	CHN	Wang Jian (Released)
16	MF	CHN	Wang Rui (loan return to Guangzhou Evergrande)
17	FW	CHN	Shewket Yalqun (loan return to Guangzhou Evergrande)
19	FW	CHN	Parhat (Released)
21	MF	CHN	Yu Haiyang (Released)
26	DF	CAF	Kelly Youga (to (England) Crawley Town)
27	MF	CHN	Ma Long (loan return to Shandong Luneng)
33	DF	CHN	Zhang Hongnan (loan return to Guangzhou Evergrande)

=== Qingdao Jonoon ===
In:

No.	Pos.	Nation	Player
3	DF	CHN	Li Mou (from Chengdu Tiancheng)
4	DF	CHN	Zhao Peng (from Guangzhou Evergrande)
9	FW	BRA	Deivdy Reis (from (Brazil) Avaí FC)
10	FW	CIV	Ismaël Béko Fofana (loan from (Serbia) FK Partizan)
15	MF	CHN	Qian Zhelong (Free Agent)
19	MF	CHN	Dilmurat Batur (Free Agent)
20	MF	HON	Jorge Claros (from (United States) Sporting Kansas City)
29	MF	CHN	Hu Weiwei (from Guangzhou Evergrande)
30	DF	CHN	He Yang (from Tianjin Teda)
44	FW	CHN	Lu Yi (loan return from Shandong Tengding)
52	MF	CHN	Li Hao (Free Agent)
-	DF	CHN	Jiao Zhe (loan return from Nei Mongol Zhongyou)
-	DF	CHN	Zheng Jianfeng (loan return from Dalian Transcendence)
-	MF	CHN	Ma Leilei (loan return from Meizhou Wuhua)
-	DF	CHN	Wei Renjie (loan return from Nanjing Qianbao)
-	MF	CHN	Xing Dong (loan return from Shandong Tengding)
-	MF	CHN	Pang Zhiquan (loan return from Guizhou Zhicheng)

Out:

No.	Pos.	Nation	Player
3	DF	CHN	Jiao Zhe (to Nei Mongol Zhongyou)
4	DF	HON	Osman Chávez (loan return to (Poland) Wisła Kraków)
6	DF	CHN	Liu Yangyang (Released)
7	DF	CHN	Yao Jiangshan (to Hunan Billows)
9	MF	CRC	Mauricio Castillo (loan return to (Costa Rica) Deportivo Saprissa)
10	FW	ROU	Cristian Dănălache (to Xinjiang Tianshan Leopard)
11	FW	CHN	Mao Jianqing (loan return to Beijing Guoan)
19	DF	CHN	Song Wenjie (to Hebei China Fortune)
25	MF	CHN	Zou Zheng (to Guangzhou Evergrande)
34	MF	CHN	Pan Yuchen (Released)

=== Shenzhen F.C. ===
In:

No.	Pos.	Nation	Player
1	GK	CHN	Niu Ben (from Guangdong Sunray Cave)
7	MF	CHN	Huang Long (from Meixian Hakka)
11	FW	SEN	André Senghor (Free Agent)
16	DF	CHN	Sun Zheng'ao (loan from Hangzhou Greentown)
18	MF	CHN	Wu Wei'an (from Guangzhou R&F)
21	FW	CHN	Cai Jingyuan (from Guangdong Sunray Cave)
32	DF	CHN	Zhang Hongnan (loan from Guangzhou Evergrande)
45	FW	CHN	Wei Jingxing (from Guangdong Sunray Cave)
46	DF	CHN	Xiong Changqing (from Guangdong Sunray Cave)

Out:

No.	Pos.	Nation	Player
1	GK	CHN	Zhang Xunwei (to Shanghai Shenxin)
7	MF	CHN	Wang Hongliang (Released)
18	MF	CHN	Niu Xiucheng (loan return to Hangzhou Greentown)
19	FW	CHN	Wei Chao (loan return to Chengdu Tiancheng)
20	MF	CHN	Wang Dong (Released)
32	MF	BRA	Bruno Coutinho (to (Japan) Tokyo Verdy)
34	MF	CHN	Hu Jinhao (Released)

=== Tianjin Songjiang ===
In:

No.	Pos.	Nation	Player
8	MF	CHN	Wang Peng (Free Agent)
12	DF	CHN	Liu Sheng (from Guangdong Sunray Cave)
14	MF	CHN	Huang Long (from Xinjiang Tianshan Leopard)
19	MF	CHN	Su Yuanjie (Free Agent)
21	MF	CHN	Chu Jinzhao (from Tianjin Teda)
30	GK	CHN	Yang Jun (from Shenyang Zhongze)
-	MF	CHN	Cai Chuchuan (loan return from Guizhou Zhicheng)

Out:

No.	Pos.	Nation	Player
13	MF	CHN	Zhang Sen (Released)
14	MF	CHN	Ma Yuxiao (to (Spain) UB Conquense)
17	MF	CHN	Cai Chuchuan (to Lijiang Jiayunhao)
18	FW	CHN	Wu Lei (to Tianjin Locomotive)
19	MF	CHN	Du Shaobin (to Guizhou Zhicheng)
22	GK	CHN	Song Tao (to Lijiang Jiayunhao)
26	FW	CHN	Fan Baiqun (loan return to Tianjin Teda)
30	DF	CHN	Li Gen (Released)
31	MF	CHN	Gao Wenfan (Released)
33	DF	CHN	Zhong Beiwei (Released)
43	GK	CHN	Bai Shuo (to Shanghai Shenhua)
54	DF	CHN	Qiu Bing (Released)

=== Wuhan Zall ===
In:

No.	Pos.	Nation	Player
9	FW	ESP	Rafa Jordà (Free Agent)
10	DF	GHA	Ransford Addo (from Shanghai SIPG)
22	GK	CHN	Wang Yi (from Chengdu Tiancheng)
25	FW	GLP	Brice Jovial (from Chengdu Tiancheng)
27	MF	CHN	Zhang Li (loan from Henan Jianye)
45	FW	CHN	Gao Teng (from Shandong Tengding)
48	DF	CHN	Wang Peng (from Shandong Tengding)
-	GK	CHN	Wang Min (loan return from Nanjing Qianbao)
-	MF	CHN	Wang Yunlong (loan return from Jiangxi Liansheng)
-	MF	CHN	Li Kaifa (loan return from Yinchuan Helanshan)

Out:

No.	Pos.	Nation	Player
9	FW	CHN	Tan Si (to Nanjing Qianbao)
10	FW	URU	Sergio Leal (to (Greece) PAE Kerkyra)
11	DF	CHN	Zhu Ting (to Dalian Aerbin)
15	MF	CHN	Sang Yifei (to Tianjin Teda)
16	GK	CHN	Wu Yan (to Henan Jianye)
19	DF	SEN	Jacques Faty (to (Australia) Sydney FC)
25	DF	CHN	Liu Yang (to Guizhou Renhe)
28	DF	CHN	Cai Shun (Released)
30	MF	CHN	Zhou Heng (to Xinjiang Tianshan Leopard)
33	DF	CHN	Xiong Fei (loan return to Shanghai Shenhua)
35	MF	CHN	Jin Xin (Released)
36	FW	BRA	Tássio (to (Brazil) Botafogo)
41	GK	CHN	Wang Min (to Jiangxi Liansheng)
-	MF	CHN	Wang Yunlong (to Inner Mongolia Zhongyou)
-	MF	CHN	Li Kaifa (to Yinchuan Helanshan)

=== Xinjiang Tianshan Leopard ===
In:

No.	Pos.	Nation	Player
2	DF	CHN	Arpati Mijiti (Free Agent)
5	MF	CHN	Zhou Heng (from Wuhan Zall)
9	FW	BRA	Felipe Ferro (from Beijing Baxy)
10	FW	ROU	Cristian Dănălache (from Qingdao Jonoon)
18	FW	CHN	Jiang Sheng (from Beijing BIT)
30	FW	CHN	Shewket Yalqun (loan from Guangzhou Evergrande)

Out:

No.	Pos.	Nation	Player
1	GK	CHN	Liang Yunfeng (Released)
2	DF	CHN	Zhang Zhi (to Guizhou Zhicheng)
9	MF	CRC	Johnny Woodly (Released)
18	FW	CHN	Yu Chennan (Released)
25	FW	CHN	Bari Mamatil (loan return to Jiangsu Guoxin Sainty)
37	MF	CHN	Huang Long (to Tianjin Songjiang)
38	FW	CRC	Allan Alemán (Released)

=== Yanbian Changbaishan ===
In:

No.	Pos.	Nation	Player
4	DF	CHN	Zhao Ming (from Guangzhou R&F)
9	FW	GAM	Bubacarr Trawally (loan from Hangzhou Greentown)
10	FW	BRA	Jaílton Paraíba (from Shanghai Shenxin)
14	MF	CHN	Wang Zhipeng (loan from Hangzhou Greentown)
18	FW	KOR	Ha Tae-goon (loan from (South Korea) Suwon Samsung Bluewings)
23	DF	CHN	Pei Yuwen (from Shenyang Zhongze)
25	MF	CHN	Exmetjan Ekber (from Xinjiang Tianshan Leopard)
32	MF	CHN	Shen Feng (from Guangdong Sunray Cave)
41	FW	CHN	Wen Huyi (from Shenyang Zhongze)

Out:

No.	Pos.	Nation	Player
4	DF	CHN	Li Minhui (to Guangxi Longguida)
7	MF	CHN	Cui Ren (to Shanghai Shenxin)
9	FW	KOR	Kim Do-Hyung (Released)
10	MF	CHN	Chi Zhongguo (to Shanghai Shenxin)
11	MF	KOR	Kim Ki-Soo (to (South Korea) Daejeon Citizen)
14	MF	CHN	Li Longhu (to Guangxi Longguida)
25	FW	CHN	Li Xun (Released)
40	FW	CIV	Serge Roland (Released)
