= 2012 Hangzhou Greentown F.C. season =

Hangzhou Greentown F.C.
- Chairman: Song Weiping
- Manager: Takeshi Okada
- Super League: -
- FA Cup: -
Home colours	Away colours

The 2012 Hangzhou Greentown F.C. season is Hangzhou's 6th consecutive season in the Chinese Super League. Hangzhou will also be competing in the Chinese FA Cup.

== Players ==
=== First team ===
Note: Flags indicate national team as defined under FIFA eligibility rules; some limited exceptions apply. Players may hold more than one non-FIFA nationality.

No.	Pos.	Nation	Player
1	GK	CHN	Han Feng
2	MF	KOR	Jeong Dong-Ho
3	DF	KOR	Kim Dong-Jin
4	MF	CHN	Cai Shun
5	DF	CHN	Du Wei (Captain)
6	MF	CHN	Shi Ke
7	MF	CHN	Xie Zhiyu
8	FW	CHN	Chen Zhongliu
9	FW	BRA	Mazola
10	FW	BRA	Renatinho
11	MF	BRA	Fabrício
12	FW	CHN	Cai Chuchuan
13	DF	CHN	Cao Xuan
14	MF	CHN	Feng Gang
15	DF	CHN	Sun Ji
16	DF	CHN	Fan Xiaodong
17	FW	CHN	Yang Zi

No.	Pos.	Nation	Player
18	DF	CHN	Zheng Kewei
19	DF	CHN	Tang Jiashu
20	FW	CHN	Bari Mamatili
21	GK	CHN	Gu Chao
22	DF	CHN	Xie Pengfei
23	DF	CHN	Liu Bin
25	DF	CHN	Wu Hang
26	MF	CHN	Niu Xiucheng
27	MF	CHN	Wang Kai
28	DF	CHN	Cao Haiqing
29	GK	CHN	Jiang Bo (vice captain)
30	FW	CHN	Zeng Yue
31	MF	CHN	Yang Chen
32	DF	CHN	Wu Yuyin
33	MF	CHN	Wang Song
34	GK	CHN	Zou Dehai
35	MF	CHN	Yang Ke

=== Reserve squad ===
Note: Flags indicate national team as defined under FIFA eligibility rules; some limited exceptions apply. Players may hold more than one non-FIFA nationality.

No.	Pos.	Nation	Player
21	FW	CHN	Dong Yu
36	FW	CHN	Zang Yifeng
37	DF	CHN	Zhao Yuhao
38	MF	CHN	Yi Baidi
39	DF	CHN	Sun Zhengao
40	DF	CHN	Xiong Wei
41	MF	CHN	Wang Xuankai
42	MF	CHN	Hui Ge
43	MF	CHN	Zhao Xiaotian

No.	Pos.	Nation	Player
44	MF	CHN	Wang Zhipeng
45	FW	CHN	Zhou Dongfang
46	FW	CHN	Fang Zhengyang
47	DF	CHN	Wu Guodong
48	DF	CHN	Zhang Zhengyu
49	GK	CHN	Peng Hao
50	GK	CHN	Gao Sheng
52	DF	CHN	Fan Lei
53	MF	CHN	Zhuang Jiajie

=== On loan ===
Note: Flags indicate national team as defined under FIFA eligibility rules; some limited exceptions apply. Players may hold more than one non-FIFA nationality.

No.	Pos.	Nation	Player
51	FW	CHN	Yu Haoxin (at Shenzhen Main until 31 December 2012)
—	GK	CHN	Teng Shangkun (at Chongqing F.C. until 31 December 2012)

== Coaching staff ==
Position	Staff
Head coach	(Japan) Takeshi Okada
Assistant coach	(Japan) Takeshi Ono (China) Gao Sheng (China) Yang Ji
Goalkeeping coach	(Brazil) Ica
Fitness coach	(Japan) Yoshimune Shimamura
Team physician	(China) Nie Lianjun (China) Liu Peimao

Source: Sina.com

== Competitions ==
=== Chinese Super League ===
==== League table ====
Pos	Team	Pld	W	D	L	GF	GA	GD	Pts
9	Shanghai Shenhua	30	8	14	8	39	34	+5	38
10	Liaoning Whowin	30	8	12	10	40	41	−1	36 (Note: Liaoning, 10pts; Hangzhou, 9pts; Shandong, 6pts, GF=4, GA=5; Qingdao, 6pts, GF=4, GA=5)
11	Hangzhou Greentown	30	9	9	12	34	46	−12	36
12	Shandong Luneng	30	8	12	10	46	43	+3	36
13	Qingdao Jonoon	30	10	6	14	26	34	−8	36

Source: Chinese Super League (in Chinese)
Rules for classification: 1) points; 2) goal difference; 3) number of goals scored; 4) head-to-head goals scored; 5) goal difference; 6) goals scored; 7) disciplinary points (1 point for each yellow card, 3 points for each red card). Head-to-Head: Only used at the end of the season when two or more teams need the head-to-head rules to break a tie.

==== Matches ====
11 March 2012 Week 1	Hangzhou Greentown	0 - 0	Qingdao Jonoon	Yellow Dragon Sports Center
Sunday 15:30		Report		Attendance: 19,623; Referee: Wang Zhe

17 March 2012 Week 2	Jiangsu Sainty	3 - 0	Hangzhou Greentown	Nanjing, Jiangsu
15:30 UTC+8	Lu Bofei 43'; Jiang Jiajun 76'; Mrdaković 86'	Report		Stadium: Nanjing Olympic Sports Center; Attendance: 21,432; Referee: Wang Jin

=== Chinese FA Cup ===
Tuesday 26 June 2012 3	Hangzhou Greentown	3 – 0	Shanghai East Asia	Hangzhou
20:35		Report		Stadium: Yellow Dragon Sports Center

Tuesday 17 July 2012 4	Hangzhou Greentown	2 – 1	Chengdu Blades	Hangzhou
20:35	Wu Yuyin 41'; Fabrício 72'	Report	Wang Cun 18'	Stadium: Yellow Dragon Sports Center
