= China Wind =

China Wind may refer to:

== Company ==
- China Wind (company), a defunct Canadian wind power company
- China Wind Systems, a Chinese engineering company

== Music ==
- China Wind music, fusion music combining traditional Chinese cultural elements with global music styles
