= Huayang =

Huayang may refer to:

- Ancient name of the Sichuan region, including Chongqing and Hanzhong
  - Chronicles of Huayang, chinese gazetteer
  - Huayang County, former county in Sichuan, now part of Shuangliu
- Huayang, Wuhua County, chinese town in Wuhua County
- Huayang Auto, former brand of Chinese cars
- Huayang station, metro station in Chengdu, China
- Huayang Dye, a subsidiary of China Wind Systems
- Huayang Electrical Power, a subsidiary of China Wind Systems
- Li Huayang, chinese footballer
