= Yang Fan =

Yang Fan may refer to:

- Yonfan (born 1947), Taiwanese film director and photographer
- Yang Fan (speed skater), Chinese speed skater
- Yang Fan (weightlifter), Chinese weightlifter
- Yang Fan (footballer, born 16 January 1995), Chinese footballer
- Yang Fan (footballer, born 24 January 1995), Chinese footballer
- Yang Fan (footballer, born 1996), Chinese footballer
- Fan Yang (artist) (born 1962), Canadian bubble artist
- Fan Yang (cyclist) (born 1990), Chinese track cyclist
- Fan Yang (pool player), Pool player
