= Song Tao =

Song Tao may refer to:

- Song Tao (diplomat) (born 1955), Chinese diplomat and politician
- Song Tao (basketball) (born 1965), Chinese basketball player
- Song Tao (footballer) (born 1982), Chinese football player
- Songthaew Type of transportation common in Asia
