= Zhang Xiaoyu (footballer) =

Chinese footballer

Zhang Xiaoyu 张小宇
Personal information
- Date of birth: January 5, 1985 (age 41)
- Place of birth: Shenyang, Liaoning, China
- Height: 1.75 m (5 ft 9 in)
- Position: Midfielder

Senior career*
Years	Team	Apps	(Gls)
2006–2014	Liaoning Whowin	36	(2)
2013	→ Lijiang Jiayunhao (loan)	4	(1)
2014	→ Nanjing Qianbao (loan)	4	(0)
2015–2016	Shenyang Urban	0	(0)
2017–2018	Jilin Baijia	33	(0)
- * Club domestic league appearances and goals as of 13 October 2018

Zhang Xiaoyu (Chinese: 张小宇; born 5 January 1985) is a Chinese football player.

== Club career ==
In 2006, Zhang Xiaoyu started his professional footballer career with Liaoning Whowin in the Chinese Super League. He made his league debut for Liaoning on 4 October 2007 in a game against Wuhan Guanggu, coming on as a substitute for Yang Shilin in the 46th minute. In January 2013, Zhang was loaned to China League Two side Lijiang Jiayunhao until 31 June. In July 2014, Zhang was loaned to China League Two side Nanjing Qianbao until 31 December.

In 2015, Zhang signed for Shenyang Urban. In March 2017, Zhang transferred to League Two side Jilin Baijia.

== Club career statistics ==
Statistics accurate as of match played 13 October 2018.

Club performance			League		Cup		League Cup		Continental		Total	
Season	Club	League	Apps	Goals	Apps	Goals	Apps	Goals	Apps	Goals	Apps	Goals
China PR			League		FA Cup		CSL Cup		Asia		Total	
2006	Liaoning Whowin	Chinese Super League	0	0	0	0	-		-		0	0
2007	Liaoning Whowin	Chinese Super League	3	0	-		-		-		3	0
2008	Liaoning Whowin	Chinese Super League	1	0	-		-		-		1	0
2009	Liaoning Whowin	China League One	16	1	-		-		-		16	1
2010	Liaoning Whowin	Chinese Super League	11	1	-		-		-		11	1
2011	Liaoning Whowin	Chinese Super League	1	0	2	0	-		-		3	0
2012	Liaoning Whowin	Chinese Super League	1	0	0	0	-		-		1	0
2013	Lijiang Jiayunhao	China League Two	4	1	0	0	-		-		4	1
2013	Liaoning Whowin	Chinese Super League	3	0	1	0	-		-		4	0
2014	Liaoning Whowin	Chinese Super League	0	0	0	0	-		-		0	0
2014	Nanjing Qianbao	China League Two	4	0	-		-		-		4	0
2015	Shenyang Urban	Amateur League	-	-	-		-		-		-	-
2016	Shenyang Urban	China League Two	0	0	0	0	-		-		0	0
2017	Jilin Baijia	China League Two	16	0	3	0	-		-		19	0
2018	Jilin Baijia	China League Two	17	0	2	0	-		-		19	0
Total	China PR		59	3	6	0	0	0	0	0	65	3

== Honours ==
Liaoning Whowin

- China League One: 2009
