= Liu Bin (footballer, born 1991) =

Chinese footballer

Liu Bin 刘斌
Personal information
- Date of birth: 20 March 1991 (age 35)
- Place of birth: Jining, Shandong, China
- Height: 1.75 m (5 ft 9 in)
- Position: Defender

Youth career
- –2010: Hangzhou Greentown

Senior career*
Years	Team	Apps	(Gls)
2009	Hangzhou Sanchao		
2011–2013	Hangzhou Greentown	41	(0)
2014	Shanghai Shenhua	0	(0)
2014	→ Beijing Baxy (loan)	23	(0)
2015–2018	Beijing Enterprises	44	(1)
2019–	Hangzhou Wuyue Qiantang	16	(0)
2020	Guangxi Pingguo Haliao	8	(1)
2021–2023	Dandong Tengyue	35	(2)

International career^{‡}
2009	China U-20		
2012	China U-22	6	(0)
- * Club domestic league appearances and goals as of 31 December 2020 ‡ National team caps and goals as of 5 November 2013

Liu Bin (Chinese: 刘斌; pinyin: Liú Bīn; born 20 March 1991 in Jining) is a Chinese football player.

== Club career ==
=== Hangzhou Greentown ===
Liu started his professional football career in 2009 when he was loaned to China League Two club Hangzhou Sanchao (Zhejiang Greentown Youth) for one year. He was promoted to Hangzhou Greentown's first team squad by Wu Jingui in 2011. He made his debut for Hangzhou Greentown on 11 May 2011, in the last round of 2011 AFC Champions League group stage which Hangzhou tied with FC Seoul 1–1. On 14 July, he made his Super League debut in a 0–0 home draw against Beijing Guoan, coming on as a substitute for Jiao Zhe in the 78th minute. Liu became a regular starter as a right back after Takeshi Okada took over the club in 2012. He made 21 appearances in the 2012 season.

=== Shanghai Shenhua ===
In December 2013, Chinese Super League side Shanghai Shenhua official announced that they had signed Liu Bin from Hangzhou Greentown.

In February 2014, Liu moved to China League One side Beijing Baxy on a one-year loan deal.

== International career ==
Liu received his first called up into China U-22 in April 2012. He made his debut for the U-22s on 9 May, in a 2-2 friendly home draw against Malawi. He was included in the squad for 2013 AFC U-22 Asian Cup qualification held by Laos in June 2012. Shi made 4 appearances in the qualification as China U-22 qualified into the 2013 AFC U-22 Championship.

== Career statistics ==
Statistics accurate as of match played 31 December 2020.

Appearances and goals by club, season and competition
Club	Season	League			National Cup		Continental		Other		Total	
Club	Season	Division	Apps	Goals	Apps	Goals	Apps	Goals	Apps	Goals	Apps	Goals
Hangzhou Sanchao	2009	China League Two			-		-		-			
Hangzhou Greentown	2011	Chinese Super League	8	0	0	0	1	0	-		9	0
Hangzhou Greentown	2012	Chinese Super League	21	0	1	0	-		-		22	0
Hangzhou Greentown	2013	Chinese Super League	12	0	1	0	-		-		13	0
Hangzhou Greentown	Total		41	0	2	0	1	0	0	0	44	0
Beijing Enterprises (loan)	2014	China League One	23	0	0	0	-		-		23	0
Beijing Enterprises	2015	China League One	2	0	0	0	-		-		2	0
Beijing Enterprises	2016	China League One	22	0	2	0	-		-		24	0
Beijing Enterprises	2017	China League One	20	1	0	0	-		-		20	1
Beijing Enterprises	2018	China League One	0	0	1	0	-		-		1	0
Beijing Enterprises	Total		44	1	3	0	0	0	0	0	47	1
Hangzhou Wuyue Qiantang	2019	China League Two	16	0	0	0	-		-		16	0
Guangxi Pingguo Haliao	2020	China League Two	8	1	-		-		-		8	1
Career total			132	2	5	0	1	0	0	0	138	2
