= Yang Zezhi =

Chinese footballer

Yang Zezhi 杨泽志
Personal information
- Full name: Yang Zezhi
- Date of birth: 11 February 1991 (age 35)
- Place of birth: Chengdu, Sichuan, China
- Height: 1.77 m (5 ft 9 1/2 in)
- Position: Midfielder

Team information
- Current team: Changchun Shenhua

Youth career
- Chengdu Blades
- 2006–2007: → FC Metz (loan)

Senior career*
Years	Team	Apps	(Gls)
2008–2013	Chengdu Blades	54	(2)
2014	Hangzhou Greentown	0	(0)
2014	→ Guizhou Zhicheng (loan)	8	(0)
2016–2020	Sichuan Longfor	49	(2)
2020	Sichuan Huakun		
2021	Guangxi Pingguo Haliao	10	(1)
2022-	Changchun Shenhua	0	(0)
- * Club domestic league appearances and goals as of 17 May 2022

Yang Zezhi (Chinese: 杨泽志; pinyin: Yáng Zézhì; born 11 February 1991) is a Chinese footballer who currently plays for Chinese club Changchun Shenhua. He is the first player born after 1990 to score in the Chinese Super League.

== Club career ==
Yang started his professional football career in 2008 when he was promoted to Chengdu Blades's first squad. He made his senior debut on 10 May 2008, in a 1–1 home draw against Qingdao Jonoon, coming on as a substitute for Zhao Mingxin in the 66th minute. He scored his first goal eight minutes later, which made him the first player born after 1990 to score in the Chinese Super League.

On 19 February 2014, Yang transferred to Super League club Hangzhou Greentown. In July 2014, Yang was loaned to China League Two side Guizhou Zhicheng for half season. He was released at the end of 2014.

In March 2016, Yang was signed by China League Two side Sichuan Longfor.

== Career statistics ==
Statistics accurate as of match played 24 July 2019.

Club performance			League		Cup		League Cup		Continental		Total	
Season	Club	League	Apps	Goals	Apps	Goals	Apps	Goals	Apps	Goals	Apps	Goals
China PR			League		FA Cup		CSL Cup		Asia		Total	
2008	Chengdu Blades	Chinese Super League	7	1	-		-		-		7	1
2009	Chengdu Blades	Chinese Super League	0	0	-		-		-		0	0
2010	Chengdu Blades	China League One	0	0	-		-		-		0	0
2011	Chengdu Blades	Chinese Super League	6	1	0	0	-		-		6	1
2012	Chengdu Blades	China League One	22	0	3	0	-		-		25	0
2013	Chengdu Blades	China League One	19	0	1	0	-		-		20	0
2014	Hangzhou Greentown	Chinese Super League	0	0	0	0	-		-		0	0
2014	Guizhou Zhicheng	China League Two	8	0	0	0	-		-		8	0
2016	Sichuan Longfor	China League Two	20	1	1	0	-		-		21	1
2017	Sichuan Longfor	China League Two	16	0	1	0	-		-		17	0
2018	Sichuan Longfor	China League Two	8	1	2	0	-		-		10	1
2019	Sichuan Longfor	China League One	5	0	1	0	-		-		6	0
Total	China PR		111	4	9	0	0	0	0	0	120	4
