= Che Shiwei =

Chinese footballer

Che Shiwei 车世伟
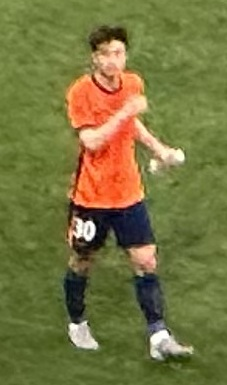
- Che Shiwei

Personal information
- Full name: Che Shiwei
- Date of birth: 30 October 1996 (age 30)
- Place of birth: Dalian, Liaoning, China
- Height: 1.83 m (6 ft 0 in)
- Position: Midfielder

Team information
- Current team: Qingdao Hainiu
- Number: 30

Youth career
- Harbin Yiteng
- Dalian Aerbin

Senior career*
Years	Team	Apps	(Gls)
2015–2019	Hebei China Fortune	19	(1)
2020–2021	Tianjin TEDA	8	(0)
2022	Kunshan FC	17	(1)
2023	Yunnan Yukun	16	(1)
2024	Foshan Nanshi	13	(0)
2025–	Qingdao Hainiu	25	(1)
- * Club domestic league appearances and goals as of 22 November 2026

Che Shiwei (simplified Chinese: 车世伟; traditional Chinese: 車世偉; pinyin: Chē Shìwěi; born 30 October 1996) is a Chinese footballer who currently plays as a midfielder for Qingdao Hainiu.

== Club career ==
Che Shiwei joined China League One side Hebei China Fortune from Dalian Aerbin on 27 February 2015. He made his senior debut on 15 April 2015 in a 2015 Chinese FA Cup match against Guangxi Longguida. On 23 May 2015, he made his league debut in a 2–1 away win against Hunan Billows, coming on as a substitute for Zhu Haiwei in the 59th minute. He played five league matches in the 2015 season as Hebei won promotion to the Chinese Super League. Che played for Hebei China Fortune's reserve team in 2016. He failed to pass the trial of China League Two side Yinchuan Helanshan in July 2016. Che returned to the first team squad in 2017. On 11 March 2017, Che made his Super League debut in a 1–1 away draw against Chongqing Lifan as the benefit of the new rule of the Super League that at least one Under-23 player must in the starting. He scored his first senior goal in the match.

After several seasons as a squad player for Hebei, he would join another top tier club in Tianjin TEDA on 14 February 2020 in a three-year contract. He would go on to make his debut in a league game on 6 August 2020 against Beijing Guoan in a 3-1 defeat. Che would go on to struggle to gain much more playing time throughout his stay at Tianjin and would be dropped to the reserves the following season before becoming a free agent and then joining second tier club Kunshan on 28 August 2022. He would go on to make his debut in a league game on 29 August 2022 against Qingdao Youth Island in a 1-0 victory. He would go on to establish himself as regular within the team and was part of the squad that won the division and promotion to the top tier at the end of the 2022 China League One campaign. Unfortunately despite this achievement on 30 March 2023, the club announced that it had dissolved due to financial difficulties. On 4 April 2023 he transferred to third tier club Yunnan Yukun.

On 1 February 2025, he joined Chinese Super League club Qingdao Hainiu.

== Career statistics ==
As of 31 December 2024.

Appearances and goals by club, season and competition
Club	Season	League			National Cup		Continental		Other		Total	
Club	Season	Division	Apps	Goals	Apps	Goals	Apps	Goals	Apps	Goals	Apps	Goals
Hebei China Fortune	2015	China League One	5	0	2	0	-		-		7	0
Hebei China Fortune	2017	Chinese Super League	8	1	2	0	-		-		10	1
Hebei China Fortune	2018	Chinese Super League	4	0	0	0	-		-		4	0
Hebei China Fortune	2019	Chinese Super League	2	0	0	0	-		-		2	0
Hebei China Fortune	Total		19	1	4	0	0	0	0	0	23	1
Tianjin TEDA	2020	Chinese Super League	8	0	3	0	-		-		11	0
Kunshan	2022	China League One	17	1	1	0	–		-		18	0
Yunnan Yukun	2023	China League Two	16	1	2	0	–		-		18	1
Foshan Nanshi	2024	China League One	13	0	1	0	–		-		14	0
Career total			73	3	11	0	0	0	0	0	84	3

== Honours ==
=== Club ===
Kunshan

- China League One: 2022
