= Yang Ke =

Chinese footballer

Yang Ke 杨柯
Personal information
- Full name: Yang Ke
- Date of birth: 19 April 1989 (age 37)
- Place of birth: Changsha, Hunan, China
- Height: 1.83 m (6 ft 0 in)
- Position: Winger

Youth career
- Hangzhou Greentown

Senior career*
Years	Team	Apps	(Gls)
2007–2008	Hangzhou Sanchao		
2009–2014	Hangzhou Greentown	7	(0)
2015–2016	Hunan Billows	25	(3)
2017–2019	Chongqing Lifan	9	(1)
- * Club domestic league appearances and goals as of 31 December 2019

Yang Ke (Chinese: 杨柯; born 19 April 1989) is a Chinese footballer as a left-footed winger.

== Club career ==
Yang Ke started his professional football career in 2007 when he was loaned to Hangzhou Greentown's satellite team Hangzhou Sanchao in the China League Two. On 11 March 2012, Yang made his debut for Hangzhou Greentown in the 2012 Chinese Super League against Qingdao Jonoon, coming on as a substitute for Xie Zhiyu in the 82nd minute. On 22 January 2015, Yang transferred to his hometown club Hunan Billows. On 4 January 2017, Yang transferred to Super League side Chongqing Lifan on a free transfer.

== Career statistics ==
Statistics accurate as of match played 31 December 2019.

Appearances and goals by club, season and competition
Club	Season	League			National Cup		Continental		Other		Total	
Club	Season	Division	Apps	Goals	Apps	Goals	Apps	Goals	Apps	Goals	Apps	Goals
Hangzhou Sanchao	2007	China League Two			-		-		-			
Hangzhou Sanchao	2008	China League Two			-		-		-			
Hangzhou Sanchao	Total				0	0	0	0	0	0		
Hangzhou Greentown	2009	Chinese Super League	0	0	-		-		-		0	0
Hangzhou Greentown	2010	Chinese Super League	0	0	-		-		-		0	0
Hangzhou Greentown	2011	Chinese Super League	0	0	0	0	0	0	-		0	0
Hangzhou Greentown	2012	Chinese Super League	7	0	0	0	-		-		7	0
Hangzhou Greentown	2013	Chinese Super League	0	0	0	0	-		-		0	0
Hangzhou Greentown	2014	Chinese Super League	0	0	0	0	-		-		0	0
Hangzhou Greentown	Total		7	0	0	0	0	0	0	0	7	0
Hunan Billows	2015	China League One	14	2	0	0	-		-		14	2
Hunan Billows	2016	China League One	11	1	0	0	-		-		11	1
Hunan Billows	Total		25	3	0	0	0	0	0	0	25	3
Chongqing Lifan	2017	Chinese Super League	0	0	1	0	-		-		1	0
Chongqing Lifan	2018	Chinese Super League	9	1	2	0	-		-		11	1
Chongqing Lifan	Total		9	1	3	0	0	0	0	0	12	1
Career total			41	4	3	0	0	0	0	0	44	4
