= Gao Jiulong =

Chinese footballer (born 1989)

Gao Jiulong 高久龙
Personal information
- Date of birth: July 27, 1989 (age 37)
- Place of birth: Shenyang, Liaoning, China
- Height: 1.80 m (5 ft 11 in)
- Position: Defender

Youth career
- Changsha Ginde

Senior career*
| Years | Team | Apps | (Gls) |
| 2009–2014 | Guangzhou R&F | 7 | (0) |
| 2013 | → Shenyang Dongjin (loan) | 6 | (0) |
| 2014 | → Nanjing Qianbao (loan) | 9 | (1) |
| 2015–2019 | Chengdu Qbao | 43 | (0) |
| 2020 | → Shanxi Longjin (loan) | 6 | (0) |
- * Club domestic league appearances and goals as of 31 December 2020

Gao Jiulong (Chinese: 高久龙; pinyin: Gāo Jiǔlóng; born 27 July 1989) is a Chinese football player.

== Club career ==
Gao joined Changsha Ginde youth team system in the early year and was promoted to first team squad in 2009. He didn't play for the club in his first two seasons. Changsha Ginde finished the bottom of the league and relegation to China League One in 2010. In February 2011, the club moved to Shenzhen as the club's name changed into Shenzhen Phoenix. Gao made his senior debut on 8 April 2010, in a 3–0 away defeat against Yanbian Baekdu Tigers. The club were then bought by Chinese property developers Guangzhou R&F and moved to Guangzhou in June and won promotion back to the Super League at the first attempt. He made 5 league appearances in the 2011 season.

In July 2013, Gao was to China League Two side Shenyang Dongjin until 31 December. In July 2014, he was loaned to China League Two side Nanjing Qianbao until 31 December.

== Career statistics ==
Statistics accurate as of match played 31 December 2020.

Appearances and goals by club, season and competition
| Club | Season | League | | | National Cup | | Continental | | Other | | Total | |
| Club | Season | Division | Apps | Goals | Apps | Goals | Apps | Goals | Apps | Goals | Apps | Goals |
|---|---|---|---|---|---|---|---|---|---|---|---|---|
| Guangzhou R&F | 2009 | Chinese Super League | 0 | 0 | - | | - | | - | | 0 | 0 |
| Guangzhou R&F | 2010 | Chinese Super League | 0 | 0 | - | | - | | - | | 0 | 0 |
| Guangzhou R&F | 2011 | China League One | 5 | 0 | 2 | 0 | - | | - | | 7 | 0 |
| Guangzhou R&F | 2012 | Chinese Super League | 2 | 0 | 1 | 0 | - | | - | | 3 | 0 |
| Guangzhou R&F | 2013 | Chinese Super League | 0 | 0 | 1 | 0 | - | | - | | 1 | 0 |
| Guangzhou R&F | Total | | 7 | 0 | 4 | 0 | 0 | 0 | 0 | 0 | 11 | 0 |
| Shenyang Dongjin (loan) | 2013 | China League Two | 6 | 0 | - | | - | | - | | 6 | 0 |
| Chengdu Qbao (loan) | 2014 | China League Two | 9 | 1 | - | | - | | - | | 9 | 1 |
| Chengdu Qbao | 2015 | China League Two | 19 | 0 | 1 | 0 | - | | - | | 20 | 0 |
| Chengdu Qbao | 2016 | China League Two | 11 | 0 | 0 | 0 | - | | - | | 11 | 0 |
| Chengdu Qbao | 2017 | China League Two | 13 | 0 | 1 | 0 | - | | - | | 14 | 0 |
| Chengdu Qbao | 2018 | Chinese Champions League | - | | - | | - | | - | | - | - |
| Chengdu Qbao | 2019 | China League Two | 0 | 0 | 1 | 0 | - | | - | | 1 | 0 |
| Chengdu Qbao | Total | | 43 | 0 | 3 | 0 | 0 | 0 | 0 | 0 | 46 | 0 |
| Shanxi Longjin | 2020 | China League Two | 6 | 0 | - | | - | | - | | 6 | 0 |
| Career total | | | 71 | 1 | 7 | 0 | 0 | 0 | 0 | 0 | 78 | 1 |
