= China Wind (company) =

Defunct Canadian wind power company

China Wind Power International Corp (China Wind) TSX-V: CNW was a Toronto, Ontario based wind power company which developed and operated wind farms in Heilongjiang Province. It had indirect exclusive rights for wind energy development in Du Mon County.

On July 8, 2009, the Company completed its merger with Berkshire Griffin Inc. (Berkshire).

On August 5, 2009, the company begin trading on the (TSX Venture Exchange). Effective October 13, 2016, the company sold all its remaining assets to British Virgin Islands-based Ruihao Trust, its shares were delisted and the company dissolved.

== Du Mon County ==
Du Mon County is located in the center of "Harbin - Daqing - Qiqihar Industry Corridor" in Heilongjiang Province.

Assessment studies in Du Mon County demonstrated potential installed capacity of 850 MW of wind energy developable over an area of 200 km^{2}, with wind power density of 300-450 watts per square meter. represents the company's long-term potential for wind power in the area.

Its present plans are for constructing a total eight wind farms representing capacity of 546 MW over five development phases.

As of June 2009, the Company completed building its first two wind farms, representing aggregate capacity of 99 MW, with construction of the first 49 megawatt wind farm over 50% completed.
