= Wu Haoran =

Chinese footballer

Wu Haoran 武浩然
Personal information
- Full name: Wu Haoran
- Date of birth: 18 January 1994 (age 32)
- Place of birth: Heze, Shandong, China
- Height: 1.86 m (6 ft 1 in)
- Position: Defender

Team information
- Current team: Zibo Qisheng

Youth career
- Shandong Luneng Taishan

Senior career*
Years	Team	Apps	(Gls)
2011–2012	Shandong Youth	29	(0)
2013–2014	→ Loures (loan)	3	(0)
2015–2020	Shijiazhuang Ever Bright	24	(0)
2021	Zibo Cuju	5	(0)
2022-	Zibo Qisheng	0	(0)
- * Club domestic league appearances and goals as of 6 May 2022

Wu Haoran (Chinese: 武浩然; born 18 January 1994 in Heze) is a Chinese footballer who currently plays as a defender for Zibo Qisheng in China League Two.

== Club career ==
Wu Haoran started his professional football career in 2011 when he joined Shandong Youth for the 2011 China League Two campaign. In August 2013, he was loaned to Campeonato de Portugal side Loures for one season. Failing to join Shandong Luneng Taishan First team, he transferred to another Chinese Super League club Shijiazhuang Ever Bright in February 2015. On 12 August 2015, Wu made his debut for Shijiazhuang in the 2015 Chinese Super League against Tianjin Teda, coming on as a substitute for Lü Hongchen in the 70th minute.

== Career statistics ==
Statistics accurate as of match played 31 December 2019.

Appearances and goals by club, season and competition
Club	Season	League			National Cup		Continental		Other		Total	
Club	Season	Division	Apps	Goals	Apps	Goals	Apps	Goals	Apps	Goals	Apps	Goals
Shandong Youth	2011	China League Two	6	0	-		-		-		6	0
Shandong Youth	2012	China League Two	23	0	1	0	-		-		24	0
Shandong Youth	Total		29	0	1	0	0	0	0	0	30	0
Loures	2013–14	Campeonato de Portugal	3	0	0	0	-		-		3	0
Shijiazhuang Ever Bright	2015	Chinese Super League	1	0	0	0	-		-		1	0
Shijiazhuang Ever Bright	2016	Chinese Super League	0	0	0	0	-		-		0	0
Shijiazhuang Ever Bright	2017	China League One	7	0	1	0	-		-		8	0
Shijiazhuang Ever Bright	2018	China League One	14	0	1	0	-		-		15	0
Shijiazhuang Ever Bright	2019	China League One	2	0	2	0	-		-		4	0
Shijiazhuang Ever Bright	Total		24	0	4	0	0	0	0	0	28	0
Career total			56	0	5	0	0	0	0	0	61	0
