= Xia Jin =

Chinese footballer

Xia Jin 夏金
Personal information
- Date of birth: February 14, 1985 (age 41)
- Place of birth: Chongqing, Sichuan, China
- Height: 1.82 m (5 ft 11 1/2 in)
- Position: Defender

Senior career*
Years	Team	Apps	(Gls)
2005–2014	Chongqing Lifan	157	(3)
2015	Guizhou Zhicheng	24	(0)
2016–2017	Chengdu Qbao	32	(3)
2018–2019	Xinjiang Tianshan Leopard	18	(0)
- * Club domestic league appearances and goals as of 3 November 2018

Xia Jin (Chinese: 夏金; born 14 February 1985) is a Chinese football player.

== Club career ==
In 2005, Xia Jin started his professional footballer career with Chongqing Lifan in the Chinese Super League. He would eventually make his league debut for Chongqing on 6 July 2005 in a game against Liaoning Whowin, coming on as a substitute for Zhao Hejing in the 73rd minute.

In February 2015, Xia transferred to China League One side Guizhou Zhicheng. On 14 March 2015, Xia transferred to China League Two side Chengdu Qbao.

== Career statistics ==
Statistics accurate as of match played 3 November 2018.

Club performance			League		Cup		League Cup		Continental		Total	
Season	Club	League	Apps	Goals	Apps	Goals	Apps	Goals	Apps	Goals	Apps	Goals
China PR			League		FA Cup		CSL Cup		Asia		Total	
2005	Chongqing Lifan	Chinese Super League	10	1	0	0	0	0	-		10	1
2006	Chongqing Lifan	Chinese Super League	22	0	0	0	-		-		22	0
2007	Chongqing Lifan	China League One	5	0	-		-		-		5	0
2008	Chongqing Lifan	China League One	15	1	-		-		-		15	1
2009	Chongqing Lifan	Chinese Super League	25	0	-		-		-		25	0
2010	Chongqing Lifan	Chinese Super League	21	0	-		-		-		21	0
2011	Chongqing Lifan	China League One	21	1	0	0	-		-		21	1
2012	Chongqing Lifan	China League One	22	0	0	0	-		-		22	0
2013	Chongqing Lifan	China League One	16	0	2	0	-		-		18	0
2014	Chongqing Lifan	China League One	0	0	0	0	-		-		0	0
2015	Guizhou Zhicheng	China League One	24	0	1	0	-		-		25	0
2016	Chengdu Qbao	China League Two	18	1	2	1	-		-		20	2
2017	Chengdu Qbao	China League Two	14	2	1	0	-		-		15	2
2018	Xinjiang Tianshan Leopard	China League One	18	0	0	0	-		-		18	0
Total	China PR		231	6	6	1	0	0	0	0	237	7

== Honours ==
=== Club ===
Chongqing Lifan

- China League One: 2014
