= Sun Zheng'ao =

Chinese footballer

Sun Zheng'ao 孙正傲
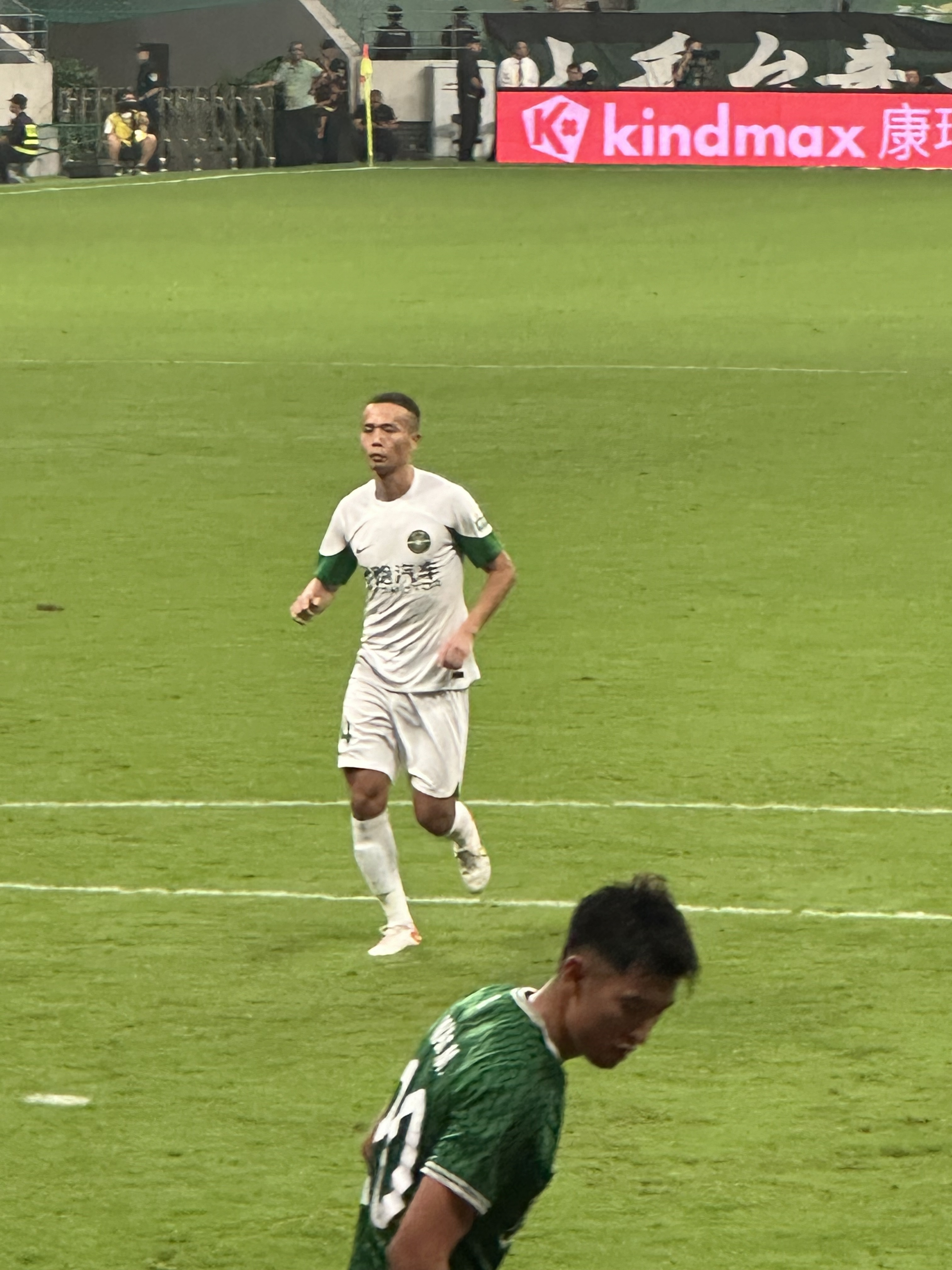
- Sun Zheng'ao in August 2024

Personal information
- Full name: Sun Zheng'ao
- Date of birth: 8 March 1994 (age 32)
- Place of birth: Qingdao, Shandong, China
- Height: 1.83 m (6 ft 0 in)
- Position: Defender

Team information
- Current team: Qingdao Hainiu
- Number: 14

Youth career
- Qingdao Hainiu Football School
- Hangzhou Greentown

Senior career*
Years	Team	Apps	(Gls)
2011	Wenzhou Provenza	10	(0)
2012–2025	Zhejiang FC	143	(2)
2014	→ BIT (loan)	12	(0)
2015	→ Shenzhen FC (loan)	2	(0)
2025	→ Qingdao Hainiu (loan)	3	(0)
2026–	Qingdao Hainiu	12	(0)

International career
2010	China U16		
2011–2012	China U19		
- * Club domestic league appearances and goals as of 22 November 2026

Sun Zheng'ao (Chinese: 孙正傲; pinyin: Sūn Zhèngào; born 8 March 1994) is a Chinese footballer who currently plays as a defender for Qingdao Hainiu.

== Club career ==
Sun joined Hangzhou Greentown youth team system from Qingdao Hainiu Football School when he was a teenager. He started his professional football career in 2011 when he was sent to China League Two club Wenzhou Provenza (Hangzhou Greentown youth team) for one year. He played 10 times in the 2011 league season. Sun was promoted to Hangzhou Greentown's first team squad by Takeshi Okada in 2012. On 26 June 2012, he made his debut in the third round of 2012 Chinese FA Cup which Hangzhou beat Shanghai Dongya 3–0. In 2012 season, he mainly played in the reserve league and made just two appearances in the FA Cup. In July 2014, Sun moved to China League One side Beijing BIT on a six-month loan deal. In February 2015, Sun was loaned to League One side Shenzhen FC for one season. He made his Super League debut on 13 August 2016 in a 3–0 home victory against Henan Jianye. Unfortunately he would be part of the squad that was relegated at the end of the season. He would remain with the club and go on to establish himself as a regular member within the team as they renamed themselves Zhejiang Professional. He would then play a vital part as the club gained promotion to the top tier at the end of the 2021 campaign.

On 5th July 2025, Sun was loan to another Chinese Super League club Qingdao Hainiu.

On 19 December 2025, Zhejiang FC announced Sun's departure after the 2025 season.

On 17 February 2026, Sun transferred to Qingdao Hainiu.

== International career ==
Sun played for China U16 in the 2010 AFC U-16 Championship. He played two matches in the group stage and was sent off in the second match against United Arab Emirates. In October 2011, he was called up into China U19 squad for 2012 AFC U-19 Championship qualification. Although China U-20 qualified into the 2012 AFC U-19 Championship, he was sent off in the last match against Australia with a flagrant foul, which team manager Jan Olde Riekerink considered it as a disgraceful action and said he would never call up Sun for the U-20s squad in the future. However, Riekerink took back his words and Sun received another called up for the 2012 AFC U-19 Championship. He played two matches in the championship as China were eliminated in the group stage after losing all three matches.

== Career statistics ==
Statistics accurate as of match played 31 January 2023.

Appearances and goals by club, season and competition
Club	Season	League			National Cup		Continental		Other		Total	
Club	Season	Division	Apps	Goals	Apps	Goals	Apps	Goals	Apps	Goals	Apps	Goals
Wenzhou Provenza	2011	China League Two	10	0	-		-		-		10	0
Hangzhou Greentown/ Zhejiang FC	2012	Chinese Super League	0	0	2	0	-		-		2	0
Hangzhou Greentown/ Zhejiang FC	2013	Chinese Super League	0	0	2	0	-		-		2	0
Hangzhou Greentown/ Zhejiang FC	2014	Chinese Super League	0	0	0	0	-		-		0	0
Hangzhou Greentown/ Zhejiang FC	2016	Chinese Super League	3	0	2	0	-		-		5	0
Hangzhou Greentown/ Zhejiang FC	2017	China League One	17	0	3	0	-		-		20	0
Hangzhou Greentown/ Zhejiang FC	2018	China League One	11	0	0	0	-		-		11	0
Hangzhou Greentown/ Zhejiang FC	2019	China League One	7	0	2	0	-		-		9	0
Hangzhou Greentown/ Zhejiang FC	2020	China League One	6	0	1	0	-		2 (Note: Appearances in Promotion/Relegation Play-offs)	0	9	0
Hangzhou Greentown/ Zhejiang FC	2021	China League One	22	1	1	0	-		2	0	25	1
Hangzhou Greentown/ Zhejiang FC	2022	Chinese Super League	18	0	4	1	-		-		22	1
Hangzhou Greentown/ Zhejiang FC	Total		84	1	17	1	0	0	4	0	105	2
B.I.T. (loan)	2014	China League One	12	0	0	0	-		-		12	0
Shenzhen Ruby (loan)	2015	China League One	2	0	0	0	-		-		2	0
Career total			108	1	17	1	0	0	4	0	129	2
