= Tang Jiashu =

Chinese footballer

Tang Jiashu 唐佳庶
Personal information
- Date of birth: 22 September 1990 (age 36)
- Place of birth: Shanghai, China
- Height: 1.83 m (6 ft 0 in)
- Positions: Defender; defensive midfielder

Team information
- Current team: Chongqing Lifan
- Number: 19

Youth career
- –2006: Genbao Football Base
- 2006–2009: Zhejiang Green Town

Senior career*
Years	Team	Apps	(Gls)
2007–2009	Hangzhou Sanchao	?	(?)
2010–2014	Hangzhou Greentown	91	(1)
2014	→ Shanghai Shenxin (loan)	19	(0)
2015–2017	Beijing Enterprises Group	59	(2)
2018–	Chongqing Lifan	32	(0)

International career
2006	China U-17		
2011	China U-23		
- * Club domestic league appearances and goals as of 31 December 2020

Tang Jiashu (Chinese: 唐佳庶; pinyin: Táng Jiāshù; born 22 September 1990) is a Chinese football player who currently plays for Chongqing Lifan in the Chinese Super League.

== Club career ==
Tang joined Zhejiang Green Town youth team system from Genbao Football Base in November 2006. He started his professional football career in 2007 when he was sent to China League Two side Hangzhou Sanchao (Zhejiang Green Town Youth) and played as a regular for the team. Tang was promoted to Hangzhou Greentown's first team squad by Wu Jingui in 2010. On 24 April, he made his Super League debut in a 0–0 home draw against Tianjin Teda, coming on as a substitute for Bari Mamatil in the 72nd minute. He became a regular starter after this match and scored his first Super League goal on 14 July which ensured Hangzhou Greentown beat Changchun Yatai 4–3. Tang made 19 appearances in his first Super League season and helped the club finish fourth place and entry into the 2011 AFC Champions League for the first time. Tang played in all six games for the club in the AFC Champions League as they crashed out within the group stages.

In February 2014, Tang moved to Chinese Super League side Shanghai Shenxin on a one-year loan deal. He transferred to China League One side Beijing Enterprises Group in February 2015.

On 2 January 2018, Tang transferred to Chinese Super League side Chongqing Dangdai Lifan.

== International career ==
Tang played for China U-17 in the 2006 AFC U-17 Championship. On 31 December 2010, he was first called up into China U-23's squad by Miroslav Blažević. He played as a regular starter in the friendly matches but became a substitute in 2012 Summer Olympics Qualifiers as China were eliminated in the Preliminary Round 2 after a 4–1 two-legged knock-out defeat against Oman.

== Career statistics ==
Statistics accurate as of match played 31 December 2020.

Appearances and goals by club, season and competition
Club	Season	League			National Cup		Continental		Other		Total	
Club	Season	Division	Apps	Goals	Apps	Goals	Apps	Goals	Apps	Goals	Apps	Goals
Hangzhou Sanchao	2007	China League Two			-		-		-			
Hangzhou Sanchao	2008	China League Two			-		-		-			
Hangzhou Sanchao	2009	China League Two			-		-		-			
Hangzhou Sanchao	Total				0	0	0	0	0	0		
Hangzhou Greentown	2010	Chinese Super League	19	1	-		-		-		19	1
Hangzhou Greentown	2011	Chinese Super League	20	0	1	0	6	0	-		27	0
Hangzhou Greentown	2012	Chinese Super League	27	0	1	0	-		-		28	0
Hangzhou Greentown	2013	Chinese Super League	25	0	1	0	-		-		26	0
Hangzhou Greentown	Total		91	1	3	0	6	0	0	0	100	1
Shanghai Shenxin (loan)	2014	Chinese Super League	19	0	3	0	-		-		22	0
Beijing Enterprises Group	2015	China League One	27	0	1	0	-		-		28	0
Beijing Enterprises Group	2016	China League One	26	2	2	0	-		-		28	2
Beijing Enterprises Group	2017	China League One	6	0	0	0	-		-		6	0
Beijing Enterprises Group	Total		59	2	3	0	0	0	0	0	62	2
Chongqing Lifan	2018	Chinese Super League	28	0	0	0	-		-		28	0
Chongqing Lifan	2019	Chinese Super League	4	0	0	0	-		-		4	0
Chongqing Lifan	Total		32	0	0	0	0	0	0	0	32	0
Career total			201	3	9	0	6	0	0	0	216	3
