= Tang Miao (footballer, born November 1990) =

Chinese footballer

Tang Miao 唐淼
Personal information
- Full name: Tang Miao
- Date of birth: 8 November 1990 (age 36)
- Place of birth: Anhui, China
- Position: Midfielder

Team information
- Current team: Zibo Cuju (on loan from Chengdu Rongcheng)

Senior career*
Years	Team	Apps	(Gls)
2009–2014	Jiangsu Sainty	1	(0)
2013	→ Shenzhen Fengpeng (loan)	14	(1)
2014	→ Nanjing Qianbao (loan)	16	(2)
2015–2017	Chengdu Qbao	61	(4)
2018-2022	Chengdu Rongcheng	50	(4)
2022–	→ Zibo Cuju (loan)	17	(0)
- * Club domestic league appearances and goals as of 8 January 2023

Tang Miao (Chinese: 唐淼; pinyin: Táng Miǎo; Mandarin pronunciation: [tʰǎŋ.mjàʊ]; born 8 November 1990 in Anhui) is a Chinese footballer who plays for Zibo Cuju, on loan from Chengdu Rongcheng.

== Club career ==
Tang Miao was signed into the first team from the academy by Jiangsu Sainty and made his debut off the bench against Beijing Guoan on 3 April 2011, coming on at 46 minutes for Zhou Yun in a 2-0 defeat. Tang would be loaned out the third tier club Shenzhen Fengpeng to gain more playing time in the 2013 league campaign. This would be followed by another loan to Nanjing Qianbao the next season.

In 2014, Tang transferred to China League Two side Nanjing Qianbao. On 8 January 2016 the club relocated to the city of Chengdu and he would move with them as they renamed themselves Chengdu Qbao. Chengdu Qbao withdrew from League Two in 2018 when the Qbao Group was under investigation with illegal fund raising. On 20 March 2018, a phoenix club was formed by Chengdu Better City Investment Group Co., Ltd. and Tang would join them as they participated in the 2018 Chinese Champions League. He would go on to win promotion with the club as they came runners-up at the end of the 2019 China League Two season. He would be a regular within the team as he aided them to a meteoric rise through the divisions as the club gained promotion to the top tier at the end of the 2021 league campaign.

== Career statistics ==
Statistics accurate as of match played 8 January 2023.

Appearances and goals by club, season and competition
Club	Season	League			National Cup		Continental		Other		Total	
Club	Season	Division	Apps	Goals	Apps	Goals	Apps	Goals	Apps	Goals	Apps	Goals
Jiangsu Sainty	2009	Chinese Super League	0	0	-		-		-		0	0
Jiangsu Sainty	2010	Chinese Super League	0	0	-		-		-		0	0
Jiangsu Sainty	2011	Chinese Super League	1	0	0	0	-		-		1	0
Jiangsu Sainty	2012	Chinese Super League	0	0	0	0	-		-		0	0
Jiangsu Sainty	Total		1	0	0	0	0	0	0	0	1	0
Shenzhen Fengpeng (loan)	2013	China League Two	14	1	1	1	-		-		15	2
Nanjing Qianbao (loan)	2014	China League Two	16	2	-		-		-		16	2
Chengdu Qbao	2015	China League Two	19	1	0	0	-		-		19	1
Chengdu Qbao	2016	China League Two	19	2	2	0	-		-		21	2
Chengdu Qbao	2017	China League Two	23	1	0	0	-		-		23	1
Chengdu Qbao	Total		61	4	2	0	0	0	2	0	63	4
Chengdu Rongcheng	2018	Chinese Champions League	-		-		-		-		-	-
Chengdu Rongcheng	2019	China League Two	29	2	2	0	-		-		31	2
Chengdu Rongcheng	2020	China League One	12	2	1	0	-		-		13	2
Chengdu Rongcheng	2021	China League One	9	0	1	0	-		0 (Note: Appearance(s) in CSL Relegation play-offs)	0	10	0
Chengdu Rongcheng	Total		50	4	4	0	0	0	0	0	54	8
Zibo Cuju (loan)	2022	China League One	17	0	0	0	-		-		17	0
Career total			159	11	7	1	0	0	0	0	166	12
