= Ma Long (footballer) =

Chinese footballer

Ma Long 马龙
Personal information
- Date of birth: February 26, 1990 (age 36)
- Place of birth: Qingdao, Shandong, China
- Height: 1.78 m (5 ft 10 in)
- Position: Midfielder

Team information
- Current team: Tai'an Tiankuang

Youth career
- 1999–2007: Shandong Luneng

Senior career*
Years	Team	Apps	(Gls)
2008–2014	Shandong Luneng	8	(0)
2014	→ Qingdao Hainiu (loan)	16	(1)
2015–2021	Qingdao	52	(4)
2021	→ Zibo Cuju (loan)	14	(3)
2022	Tai'an Tiankuang	6	(0)
2023	Xi'an Chongde Ronghai		
2024–	Zibo Home		
- * Club domestic league appearances and goals as of 2 May 2024

Ma Long (simplified Chinese: 马龙; traditional Chinese: 馬龍; pinyin: Mǎ Lóng; born 26 February 1990) is a Chinese professional footballer who plays as a midfielder for Chinese Champions League club Zibo Home.

== Club career ==
Ma Long is a graduate of the Shandong Luneng under-19 youth team. He received his promotion to the senior team in 2010 when he made his debut for them as a substitute in a 2010 AFC Champions League game against Sanfrecce Hiroshima in a 1-0 win on February 24, 2010.

In January 2014, Ma moved to China League One side Qingdao Hainiu on a one-year loan deal. After a personally successful loan spell at Qingdao where he gained regular playing time, Ma made his move permanent the following season. On 9 September 2017 in a league game against Hangzhou Greentown, he was caught in a collision while fighting for a header which resulted in him hitting the goalpost, breaking two of his ribs and seeing him miss most of the two following seasons at Qingdao.

== Career statistics ==
Statistics accurate as of match played 31 December 2019.

Appearances and goals by club, season and competition
Club	Season	League			National Cup		Continental		Other		Total	
Club	Season	Division	Apps	Goals	Apps	Goals	Apps	Goals	Apps	Goals	Apps	Goals
Shandong Luneng	2008	Chinese Super League	0	0	-		-		-		0	0
Shandong Luneng	2009	Chinese Super League	0	0	-		0	0	0 (Note: Appearances in Pan-Pacific Championship)	0	0	0
Shandong Luneng	2010	Chinese Super League	6	0	-		2	0	-		8	0
Shandong Luneng	2011	Chinese Super League	0	0	0	0	0	0	-		0	0
Shandong Luneng	2012	Chinese Super League	3	0	0	0	-		-		3	0
Shandong Luneng	2013	Chinese Super League	0	0	0	0	-		-		0	0
Shandong Luneng	Total		9	0	0	0	2	0	0	0	11	0
Qingdao Hainiu (loan)	2014	China League One	25	1	6	1	-		-		31	2
Qingdao Huanghai	2015	China League One	22	1	0	0	-		-		22	1
Qingdao Huanghai	2016	China League One	17	1	1	0	-		-		18	1
Qingdao Huanghai	2017	China League One	12	2	2	0	-		-		14	2
Qingdao Huanghai	2018	China League One	1	0	0	0	-		-		1	0
Qingdao Huanghai	2019	China League One	0	0	0	0	-		-		0	0
Qingdao Huanghai	Total		52	4	3	0	0	0	0	0	55	4
Career total			86	5	9	1	2	0	0	0	97	8

== Honours ==
Shandong Luneng

- Chinese Super League: 2008
