= Zhang Zhi (footballer) =

Chinese footballer

Zhang Zhi 张智
Personal information
- Full name: Zhang Zhi
- Date of birth: 18 February 1989 (age 37)
- Place of birth: Guiyang, Guizhou, China
- Height: 1.85 m (6 ft 1 in)
- Position: Defender

Youth career
- Genbao Football Base

Senior career*
Years	Team	Apps	(Gls)
2006–2009	Shanghai East Asia	35	(0)
2011	Hubei CTGU Kangtian	6	(0)
2012–2014	Xinjiang Tianshan Leopard	48	(0)
2015–2021	Guizhou Zhicheng	44	(2)
- * Club domestic league appearances and goals as of 31 December 2020

Zhang Zhi (simplified Chinese: 张智; traditional Chinese: 張智; pinyin: Zhāng Zhì; born 18 February 1989) is a retired Chinese footballer.

== Club career ==
Zhang Zhi graduated to China League Two side Shanghai East Asia's first team at the beginning of the 2006 league season and became the first captain of the club. He played as starter in center back position with Zhang Linpeng and helped the club win the league title and promoted to China League One in 2007. He was released by the club at the end of 2009 season after his disastrous performance in a league match which Shanghai East Asia lost to Shenyang Dongjin 3–2 and failed to promote to the first-tier. Zhang joined China League Two side Hubei CTGU Kangtian in March 2011. He transferred to another League Two club Hubei China-Kyle in 2012 and followed the club promote to the second tier in the 2012 season.

Zhang moved to his hometown club Guizhou Zhicheng in 2015. He made his debut for Guizhou on 14 March 2015 in a 1–1 away draw against Shenzhen F.C. On 19 September 2015, he scored his first senior goal which ensure Guizhou beat Hunan Billows 2–1. Zhang played eight league matches and scored one goal in the 2016 season as Guizhou won promotion to the Chinese Super League in 2016 season. On 28 April 2017, he made his Super League debut in a 3–1 away victory against Guangzhou R&F, coming on as a substitute for Min Junlin in the injury time. On 6 April 2021, Zhang would announce his retirement from professional football.

== Career statistics ==
As of 31 December 2020.

Appearances and goals by club, season and competition
Club	Season	League			National Cup		Continental		Other		Total	
Club	Season	Division	Apps	Goals	Apps	Goals	Apps	Goals	Apps	Goals	Apps	Goals
Shanghai East Asia	2006	China League Two			-		-		-			
Shanghai East Asia	2007	China League Two			-		-		-			
Shanghai East Asia	2008	China League One	23	0	-		-		-		23	0
Shanghai East Asia	2009	China League One	12	0	-		-		-		12	0
Shanghai East Asia	Total		35	0	0	0	0	0	0	0	35	0
Hubei CTGU Kangtian	2011	China League Two	6	0	-		-		-		6	0
Xinjiang Tianshan Leopard	2012	China League Two	1	0	-		-		-		1	0
Xinjiang Tianshan Leopard	2013	China League One	29	0	0	0	-		-		29	0
Xinjiang Tianshan Leopard	2014	China League One	18	0	1	0	-		-		19	0
Xinjiang Tianshan Leopard	Total		48	0	1	0	0	0	0	0	49	0
Guizhou Zhicheng	2015	China League One	26	1	0	0	-		-		26	1
Guizhou Zhicheng	2016	China League One	8	1	1	0	-		-		9	1
Guizhou Zhicheng	2017	Chinese Super League	2	0	1	0	-		-		3	0
Guizhou Zhicheng	2018	Chinese Super League	0	0	0	0	-		-		0	0
Guizhou Zhicheng	2019	China League One	1	0	0	0	-		-		1	0
Guizhou Zhicheng	2020	China League One	7	0	0	0	-		-		7	0
Guizhou Zhicheng	Total		44	2	2	0	0	0	0	0	46	2
Career total			133	2	3	0	0	0	0	0	136	2

Sporting positions
Preceded by New creation	Shanghai East Asia captain 2006	Succeeded by Wang Jiayu
