= Jiang Bo (footballer) =

Chinese footballer (born 1982)

Jiang Bo 姜波
Personal information
- Full name: Jiang Bo
- Date of birth: 25 January 1982 (age 44)
- Place of birth: Shenyang, Liaoning, China
- Height: 1.87 m (6 ft 1 1/2 in)
- Position: Goalkeeper

Team information
- Current team: Jiangxi Lushan (goalkeeping coach)

Youth career
- 1996–2001: Liaoning Youth

Senior career*
Years	Team	Apps	(Gls)
2002–2006	Nanjing Yoyo	94	(0)
2007–2014	Hangzhou Greentown	145	(0)
2014	→ Beijing Baxy (loan)	29	(0)
2015–2016	Beijing Enterprises Group	7	(0)
2017	Hebei Elite	21	(0)
2018	Hunan Billows	25	(0)

Managerial career
- 2021: Sichuan Jiuniu (goalkeeping)
- 2023–2024: Shenzhen Peng City (goalkeeping)
- 2025: Ganzhou Ruishi U21 (goalkeeping)
- 2025: Guangxi Lanhang (goalkeeping)
- 2025–: Jiangxi Lushan (goalkeeping)
- * Club domestic league appearances and goals as of 13 October 2018

Jiang Bo (Chinese: 姜波; pinyin: Jiāng Bō; born 25 January 1982 in Shenyang) is a Chinese football coach and former footballer.

== Club career ==
Jiang Bo began his football career playing for his hometown football club Liaoning Whowin's youth team. He would go on to be promoted to the club's second team who were allowed to play within the second tier of the Chinese football pyramid with the team calling themselves Liaoning Xingguang. Jiang's only season at the club would see him go on to aid the club finish sixth within the league at the end of the season.

In the 2003 league season, Liaoning Whowin would decide to sell Liaoning Xingguang to the SVT Group, who formed a new club called Nanjing Yoyo. This saw the whole squad move to Nanjing as part of the deal and Jiang would stay with Nanjing Yoyo for several seasons where he was unable to aid the team achieve anything more than mid-table mediocrity throughout his time with the club.

At the beginning of the 2007 league season, recently promoted side to the top tier Zhejiang Green Town were looking for a second choice goalkeeper and Jiang was brought in to fill this position and play understudy to Qi Xiaoguang. The following season Jiang was promoted to the team's first choice goalkeeper after he showed some impressive performances during his stint as understudy and played in the majority of the season, making twenty-six league appearances at the end of the 2008 league season. The 2009 league season saw Jiang continue his role as the team's main goalkeeper, however Hangzhou Greentown struggled throughout the league season often finding themselves near the bottom of the league table and fighting off relegation. Hangzhou survived relegation the following season, but the new manager Wu Jingui decided to promote rising goalkeeper Han Feng as the team's first choice goalkeeper to start the 2010 league season. Jiang would go on to win back his place as the club's starting goalkeeper at the end of the season and help guide the club to a fourth-place finish and entry into the AFC Champions League for the first time. Within the AFC Champions League, Jiang would play in all six games for the club as they crashed out within the group stages.

In February 2014, Jiang moved to China League One side Beijing Baxy on a one-year loan deal. After a stellar 2014 season, he made a permanent transfer to Beijing Baxy.

On 9 March 2018, Jiang transferred to League Two side Hunan Billows.

=== Hebei Elite ===
In March 2017, Jiang transferred to League Two side Hebei Elite.

== International career ==
Jiang Bo was firstly called up to the Chinese football team by José Antonio Camacho for matches against United Arab Emirates and Iraq in October 2011. On 22 February 2012, he made his debut for China in a friendly match against Kuwait, coming on as a substitute for Zeng Cheng in the 83rd minute. However, this match was not recognised as an international "A" match by FIFA.
