= Xie Zhiyu =

Chinese footballer

Xie Zhiyu 谢志宇
Personal information
- Full name: Xie Zhiyu
- Date of birth: 6 May 1987 (age 39)
- Place of birth: Wuhan, China
- Height: 1.80 m (5 ft 11 in)
- Positions: Striker; midfielder

Youth career
- 2004: Wuhan Guanggu

Senior career*
Years	Team	Apps	(Gls)
2007–2008	Wuhan Guanggu	12	(1)
2009–2014	Hangzhou Lücheng	55	(6)
- * Club domestic league appearances and goals as of 4 November 2013

Xie Zhiyu (Simplified Chinese: 谢志宇; born 6 May 1987) is a Chinese football striker, who plays for Hangzhou Lücheng in the Chinese Super League.

== Club career ==
=== Wuhan Guanggu ===
Xie Zhiyu started his professional football career with Wuhan Guanggu after graduating from their youth team in 2007. The following season saw him steadily establish himself within the squad, however this was cut short after the sudden disbanding and relegation of Wuhan Guanggu in the Chinese Super League after the club's management did not accept the punishment given to them by the Chinese Football Association after a scuffle broke out during a league game against Beijing Guoan on 27 September 2008.

=== Hangzhou Lücheng ===
At the beginning of the 2009 season Xie Zhiyu transferred to Hangzhou Lücheng where he would make his competitive debut against Henan Construction on 5 April 2009 in a 2–0 defeat. Xie would have a difficult debut season and could only score one goal throughout the 2009 campaign, which led to him often finding himself playing as a substitute. When Wu Jingui was introduced as the team's new Head coach he moved Xie into midfield and the player would finally settle within the Hangzhou team as a regular.
