= Song Tao (footballer) =

Chinese footballer

Personal information
- Date of birth: 8 April 1982 (age 44)
- Place of birth: Tianjin, China
- Height: 1.92 m (6 ft 4 in)
- Position: Goalkeeper

Team information
- Current team: Yunnan Flying Tigers
- Number: 22

Senior career*
Years	Team	Apps	(Gls)
2009–2010	Tai Chung	13	(1)
2013–2014	Tianjin Quanjian	6	(0)
2015–2018	Yunnan Flying Tigers	23	(0)
- * Club domestic league appearances and goals as of 16:41, 19 January 2019 (UTC)

Song Tao (simplified Chinese: 宋涛; traditional Chinese: 宋濤; pinyin: Sòng Tāo; born 8 April 1982) is a former Chinese footballer.

== Career statistics ==
=== Club ===
As of 19 January 2019.

Club	Season	League			Cup		Other		Total	
Club	Season	Division	Apps	Goals	Apps	Goals	Apps	Goals	Apps	Goals
Tai Chung	2009–10	Hong Kong First Division League	13	1	0	0	0	0	13	1
Tianjin Quanjian	2014	China League One	6	0	0	0	0	0	6	0
Yunnan Flying Tigers	2015	China League Two	6	0	1 (Note: Appearances in the Chinese FA Cup)	0	2 (Note: Appearances in the China League Two play/offs)	0	6	0
Yunnan Flying Tigers	2016	China League Two	9	0	2	0	0	0	11	0
Yunnan Flying Tigers	2017	China League One	2	0	1	0	0	0	3	0
Yunnan Flying Tigers	2018	China League Two	6	0	0	0	1	0	7	0
Yunnan Flying Tigers	Total		23	0	5	0	3	0	31	0
Career total			42	0	5	0	3	0	50	0
