= China Wind Systems =

China Wind Systems, Inc. (Public, OTC:CWSI) is composed of two wholly owned subsidiaries, Wuxi Huayang Dye Machine Co., Ltd. (Huayang Dye) and Wuxi Huayang Electrical Power Equipment Co., Ltd. (Huayang Electrical Power). Wuxi Huayang Dye Machine Co., Ltd. is engaged in textile dyeing and manufacturing finishing machines. Wuxi Huayang Electric Power Equipment Co., Ltd. is involved in the manufacture of equipment for electrical generation. High precision forged rolled rings for use in the wind power industry and other industries are manufactured by the Wuxi Huayang Electric Power Equipment subsidiary. They also manufacture equipment used in the production of coal generated electricity.

China Wind Systems was founded in Wuxi City, Jiangsu province in 1995 by Jianhua Wu. The company went public through a reverse merger transaction in November 2007. After the reverse merger transaction, the name was changed to China Wind System. This name change was accompanied by the launch of its wind energy business supplying forged rolled rings to the wind industry. In August 2008, the company formed a new wholly owned subsidiary, Wuxi Fulland Wind Energy Equipment Co., Ltd.

By April 2010, China Wind Systems expects to finish a new $6 million expansion at its facility that will allow it to produce steel through a process called electro-slag remelting (ESR). A $14 million deal to supply wind tower flanges to Chengxi Shipyard was recently signed by China Wind Systems.
