= Yang Fan (footballer, born 24 January 1995) =

Chinese footballer

Personal information
- Full name: Yang Fan
- Date of birth: January 24, 1995 (age 31)
- Place of birth: Hunan, China
- Height: 1.75 m (5 ft 9 in)
- Position: Defender

Team information
- Current team: Yuxi Yukun

Youth career
- 2012–2014: Guizhou Renhe
- 2015: Shanghai SIPG

Senior career*
Years	Team	Apps	(Gls)
2015	Nei Mongol Zhongyou	0	(0)
2016–2020	Shanghai SIPG	0	(0)
2017	→ Grulla Morioka (loan)	1	(0)
2018	→ Suzhou Dongwu (loan)	24	(1)
2021	Hunan Billows	19	(0)
2022-	Yuxi Yukun	0	(0)
- * Club domestic league appearances and goals as of 16 May 2022

Yang Fan (Chinese: 杨帆; pinyin: Yáng Fān; born 24 January 1995) is a Chinese football player. He plays for Chinese club Yuxi Yukun.

== Club career ==
On 15 August 2017 Shanghai SIPG would loan Yang Fan to Japanese J3 League club Grulla Morioka for the remainder of the season. He would make his senior debut in a league game for the club on 26 November 2017 against Cerezo Osaka U-23 in a 3-2 defeat.

== Career statistics ==
As of 31 December 2020.

Appearances and goals by club, season and competition
Club	Season	League			National Cup		League Cup		Continental		Total	
Club	Season	Division	Apps	Goals	Apps	Goals	Apps	Goals	Apps	Goals	Apps	Goals
Nei Mongol Zhongyou	2014	China League Two	0	0	0	0	-		-		0	0
Shanghai SIPG	2016	Chinese Super League	0	0	0	0	-		-		0	0
Grulla Morioka (loan)	2017	J3 League	1	0	0	0	-		-		1	0
Suzhou Dongwu (loan)	2018	China League Two	24	1	2	0	-		-		26	1
Career total			25	1	2	0	0	0	0	0	27	1
