= Li Huayang =

Chinese footballer

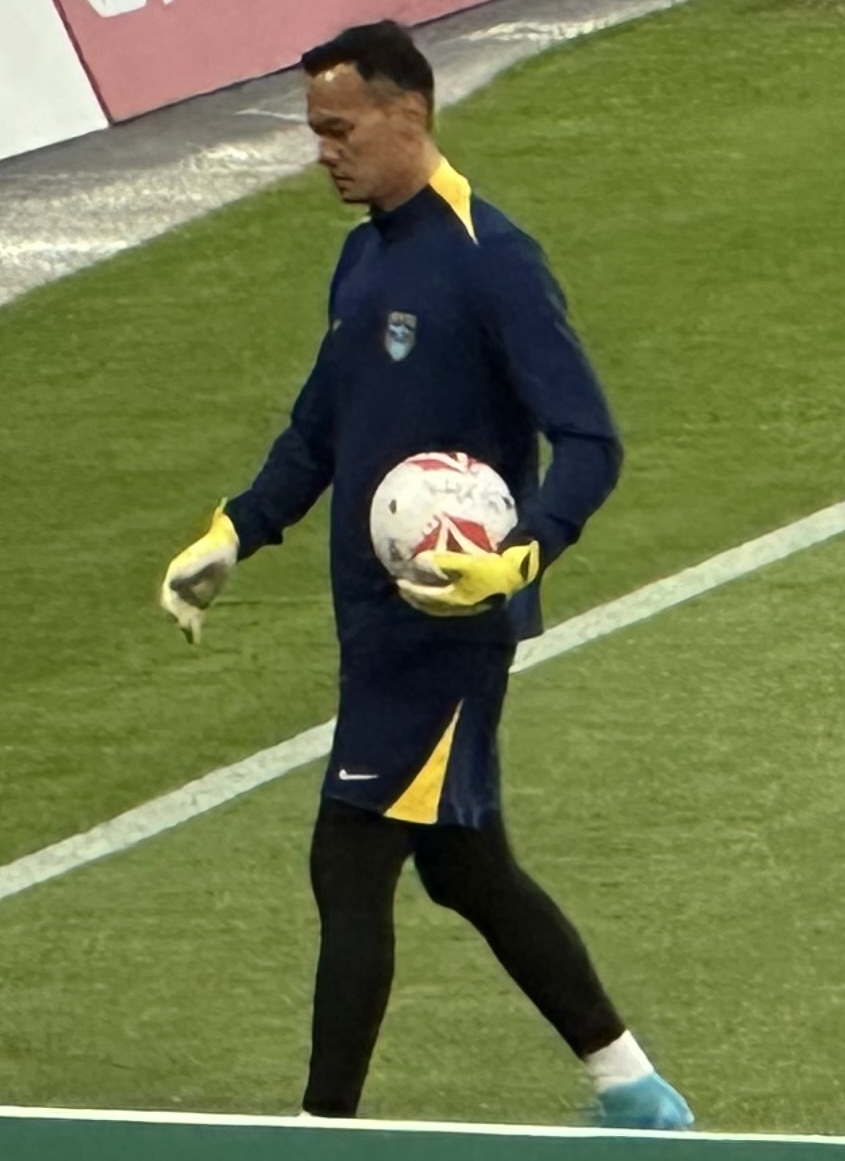
- Li Huayang in May 2025

Personal information
- Date of birth: 24 January 1987 (age 39)
- Place of birth: Chongqing, Sichuan, China
- Height: 1.88 m (6 ft 2 in)
- Position: Goalkeeper

Team information
- Current team: Nantong Zhiyun (goalkeeping coach)

Senior career*
Years	Team	Apps	(Gls)
2011–2014	Chongqing Lifan	0	(0)
2015	Beijing IT	16	(0)
2016–2024	Nantong Zhiyun	91	(0)

Managerial career
- 2025-: Nantong Zhiyun (goalkeeping)
- * Club domestic league appearances and goals as of 31 December 2023

Li Huayang (Chinese: 李华扬; born 24 January 1987) is a Chinese former footballer who played as a goalkeeper.

== Club career ==
Li Huayang would be promoted to the senior team of Chongqing Lifan and go on to make his debut in a 2011 Chinese FA Cup game on 4 May 2011 against Beijing Baxy in a 3-0 victory. He would be used as a reserve choice goalkeeper behind Zhang Lei as the club went on to win the division title and promotion to the top tier at the end of the 2014 China League One season. Li would join another second tier club in Beijing IT, where he would gain significantly more playing time, but would unfortunately be part of the team that was relegated at the end of the 2015 China League One season.

The following season, Li would join third tier club Nantong Zhiyun and would go on to establish himself as a regular as the team went on to gain promotion to the second tier at the end of the 2018 China League Two campaign. A constant regular within the team, he would help establish the club within the division and was part of the squad as they gained promotion to the top tier at the end of the 2022 China League One season.

== Career statistics ==
As of 16 July 2024.

Club	Season	League			Cup		Continental		Other		Total	
Club	Season	Division	Apps	Goals	Apps	Goals	Apps	Goals	Apps	Goals	Apps	Goals
Chongqing Lifan	2011	China League One	0	0	2	0	–		–		2	0
Chongqing Lifan	2012	China League One	0	0	0	0	–		–		0	0
Chongqing Lifan	2013	China League One	0	0	1	0	–		–		1	0
Chongqing Lifan	2014	China League One	0	0	0	0	–		–		0	0
Chongqing Lifan	Total		0	0	3	0	0	0	0	0	3	0
Beijing IT	2015	China League One	16	0	0	0	–		–		16	0
Nantong Zhiyun	2016	China League Two	18	0	1	0	–		–		19	0
Nantong Zhiyun	2017	China League Two	24	0	2	0	–		–		26	0
Nantong Zhiyun	2018	China League Two	25	0	4	0	–		–		29	0
Nantong Zhiyun	2019	China League One	20	0	1	0	–		–		21	0
Nantong Zhiyun	2020	China League One	0	0	0	0	–		–		0	0
Nantong Zhiyun	2021	China League One	1	0	0	0	–		–		1	0
Nantong Zhiyun	2022	China League One	2	0	0	0	–		–		1	0
Nantong Zhiyun	2023	Chinese Super League	1	0	1	0	–		–		2	0
Nantong Zhiyun	2024	Chinese Super League	0	0	2	0	–		–		2	0
Nantong Zhiyun	Total		91	0	11	0	0	0	0	0	101	0
Career total			107	0	14	0	0	0	0	0	121	0

== Honours ==
=== Club ===
Chongqing Lifan

- China League One: 2014
