= Wu Jingui =

Chinese footballer and manager

Wu Jingui 吴金贵
Personal information
- Full name: Wu Jingui
- Date of birth: January 10, 1961 (age 65)
- Place of birth: Shanghai, China

Youth career
- 1973–1977: Shanghai Juvenile
- 1977–1978: Shanghai Youth
- 1978–1982: Beijing Sports Institute

Senior career*
Years	Team	Apps	(Gls)
1982–1983	Zhejiang Province football team		
1985–1986	Zhejiang Workers		
1991–1993	SV Deutz 05		

Managerial career
- 2002–2003: Shanghai Shenhua
- 2006: Shanghai Shenhua
- 2007–2008: Shanghai Shenhua
- 2009–2011: Zhejiang Lücheng
- 2012: Shandong Luneng Taishan (caretaker)
- 2017–2018: Shanghai Shenhua
- 2020–2021: Qingdao Huanghai
- 2022–2023: Shanghai Shenhua
- * Club domestic league appearances and goals

Wu Jingui
- Simplified Chinese: 吴金贵
- Traditional Chinese: 吳金貴
Transcriptions
Standard Mandarin
- Hanyu Pinyin: Wú Jīnguì
- IPA: [ǔ tɕín kwêɪ]

Wu Jingui (Chinese: 吴金贵; pinyin: Wú Jīnguì; Mandarin pronunciation: [ǔ tɕín kwêɪ]; born January 10, 1961, in Shanghai) is a Chinese football manager.

== Playing career ==
While Wu Jingui played for the Shanghai youth football team, he never graduated to the senior team and only played amateur football with the Zhejiang Province football team for a short period. Instead of football, he would concentrate on achieving a soccer management degree, which saw him study in Beijing and Cologne for several years. This would see him gain an assistant management position at Shanghai Shenhua F.C., where he stayed with them until July 21, 2002.

== Management career ==
Wu Jingui would replace Xu Genbao as the head coach of Shanghai Shenhua F.C. on July 22, 2002 after a disappointing start to the 2002 league season, Wu Jingui would eventually steer Shanghai to finish in a disappointing 12th in the league. With a fresh start to the new season Wu Jingui would guide Shanghai to win their first league title in eight years when they won the 2003 Chinese Jia-A League title. Surprisingly he left Shanghai the following season to join Arie Haan as an assistant for the Chinese national team to help him for the 2004 AFC Asian Cup; however, once Arie Haan left after the tournament, Wu Jingui would return to Shanghai as an assistant again. At the beginning of the 2006 Chinese Super League he would return as the head coach of Shanghai Shenhua when he replaced Valeri Nepomniachi and coach them to second within the league.

At the beginning of the 2007 Chinese Super League season, Shanghai Shenhua F.C. had a new owner in Zhu Jun, and he replaced Wu Jingui with Osvaldo Giménez. Wu Jingui was, however, quickly brought back in after Osvaldo Gimenez's disappointing reign to help them salvage their season and would steer them to a respectable fourth within the league. Wu Jingui's third reign at Shanghai didn't last very longer as after ill health and a disappointing start to the season he was sacked and replaced with Jia Xiuquan.

On 6 September 2012, Wu was officially appointed as the technical director and interim head coach of Chinese Super League club Shandong Luneng Taishan F.C., after Dutch manager Henk ten Cate resigned.

Wu Jingui became the head coach of Shanghai Shenhua again in 2022 but was removed before the 2024 season.

== Honours ==
=== Manager ===
Shanghai Shenhua

- Chinese FA Cup: 2017, 2023
