= List of Chinese football transfers winter 2014 =

This is a list of Chinese football transfers for the 2014 season winter transfer window. Only moves from Super League and League One are listed. The transfer window opened on 1 January 2014 and closed on 28 February 2014.

== Super League ==
=== Beijing Guoan ===
In:

No.	Pos.	Nation	Player
2	DF	CHN	Li Yunqiu (from Shanghai East Asia)
9	FW	CHN	Tan Tiancheng (loan return from Lijiang Jiayunhao)
11	MF	CHN	Song Boxuan (from Shanghai Shenhua)
16	MF	KOR	Ha Dae-Sung (from (South Korea) FC Seoul)
17	MF	ARG	Pablo Batalla (from (Turkey) Bursaspor)
23	MF	CHN	Chen Zhizhao (from Shanghai Shenxin)
31	DF	CHN	Zhao Hejing (from Dalian Aerbin)
42	MF	CHN	Fan Yang (from Chongqing Youth U20)
-	DF	HKG	Lee Chi Ho (loan return from (Hong Kong) South China)
-	DF	CHN	Zhang Junzhe (loan return from Shenyang Dongjin)
-	MF	CHN	Xu Wu (loan return from Shenyang Dongjin)
-	DF	CHN	Jiang Tao (loan return from Meizhou Kejia)
-	DF	CHN	Zhang Yonghai (loan return from Shanghai Shenxin)
-	MF	CHN	Zhang Jian (loan return from Hebei Zhongji)
-	FW	CHN	Mao Jianqing (loan return from Shanghai Shenxin)
-	FW	BRA	André Lima (loan return from (Brazil) Vitória)
-	DF	CHN	Zhang Jizhou (loan return from Beijing BIT)
-	MF	CHN	Zhu Yifan (loan return from Henan Jianye)
-	DF	CHN	Meng Yang (loan return from Meizhou Kejia)
-	FW	SRB	Andrija Kaluđerović (loan return from (Serbia) FK Vojvodina)

Out:

No.	Pos.	Nation	Player
2	DF	UZB	Egor Krimets (loan return to (Uzbekistan) Pakhtakor Tashkent)
11	FW	MLI	Frédéric Kanouté (Retired)
14	DF	HKG	Lee Chi Ho (to (Hong Kong) South China)
16	DF	CHN	Zhang Junzhe (Released)
17	MF	CHN	Xu Wu (Released)
19	MF	CHN	Wang Xiaolong (to Guangzhou R&F)
23	DF	CHN	Jiang Tao (Released)
27	DF	CHN	Zhang Yonghai (to Liaoning Whowin)
28	MF	CHN	Zhang Jian (Released)
33	FW	CHN	Mao Jianqing (loan to Qingdao Jonoon)
35	MF	CHN	Li Tixiang (loan to (Portugal) C.D. Tondela)
38	FW	BRA	André Lima (loan to (Brazil) Criciúma)
42	DF	CHN	Hong Sidong (Released)
43	MF	CHN	Li Yipu (Released)
47	DF	CHN	Zhang Jizhou (to Beijing BIT)
50	DF	CHN	Xu Hailiang (loan to Quanzhou Broncos)
51	DF	CHN	Zhao Hui (loan to Guizhou Zhicheng)
54	MF	CHN	Zhang Heng (Released)
61	DF	CHN	He Yuan (Released)
62	GK	CHN	Zhao Tianci (to Guangzhou Evergrande)
64	DF	CHN	Zhong Yi (Released)
65	MF	CHN	Fu Hao (Released)
67	MF	CHN	Sun Chaofan (Released)
-	MF	CHN	Zhu Yifan (to Henan Jianye)
-	DF	CHN	Meng Yang (to Beijing BIT)
-	FW	SRB	Andrija Kaluđerović (loan to (Cyprus) AEL Limassol)

=== Changchun Yatai ===
In:

No.	Pos.	Nation	Player
9	FW	MNE	Fatos Beqiraj (from (Croatia) Dinamo Zagreb)
11	FW	BRA	Rafael Coelho (from Guangzhou R&F)
13	DF	CHN	Mou Yanlong (loan return from Shaanxi Laochenggen)
17	MF	ARG	Walter Iglesias (from (Greece) Atromitos)
20	DF	CHN	He Chao (loan return from Jilin Youth U18)
30	GK	CHN	Zhou Miao (loan return from Shaanxi Laochenggen)
41	DF	CHN	Li Hong (loan return from Shaanxi Laochenggen)
44	FW	CHN	Zhao Haoxiang (loan return from Shaanxi Laochenggen)
46	MF	CHN	Wang Si (loan return from Shaanxi Laochenggen)
-	MF	CHN	Wang Dong (loan return from Shandong Tengding)
-	GK	CHN	Yi Fan (loan return from Lijiang Jiayunhao)
-	MF	CHN	Piao Qianhua (loan return from Yanbian Baekdu Tigers)
-	DF	CHN	Qu Peng (loan return from Shaanxi Laochenggen)
-	MF	CHN	Mou Yiming (loan return from Shaanxi Laochenggen)
-	MF	CHN	Wang Jinliang (loan return from Shaanxi Laochenggen)
-	DF	CHN	Pan Ximing (loan return from Shaanxi Laochenggen)
-	MF	CHN	Wu Peng (loan return from Shaanxi Laochenggen)

Out:

No.	Pos.	Nation	Player
3	DF	BRA	Éder Baiano (Released)
6	MF	CHN	Wang Dong (to Chongqing Lifan)
10	FW	BRA	Isac (to (Brazil) América)
11	FW	CHN	Zhang Wenzhao (to Shandong Luneng)
17	FW	CHN	Cheng Changcheng (loan to Yinchuan Helanshan)
20	FW	CZE	Jan Rezek (to (Czech Republic) Viktoria Plzeň)
27	FW	CHN	Bai Zijian (Released)
30	GK	CHN	Wang Xiang (Released)
33	MF	CHN	Liu Qiming (loan to Yinchuan Helanshan)
37	DF	CHN	Zhao Mingjian (loan return to Shandong Luneng)
50	FW	CHN	Wang Pengli (Released)
53	MF	CHN	Niu Luyuan (loan to Yinchuan Helanshan)
-	GK	CHN	Yi Fan (to Lijiang Jiayunhao)
-	MF	CHN	Piao Qianhua (loan to Quanzhou Broncos)
-	DF	CHN	Qu Peng (Released)
-	MF	CHN	Mou Yiming (Released)
-	MF	CHN	Wang Jinliang (Released)
-	DF	CHN	Pan Ximing (Released)
-	MF	CHN	Wu Peng (Released)

=== Dalian Aerbin ===
In:

No.	Pos.	Nation	Player
3	DF	SWE	Niklas Backman (from (Sweden) AIK Fotboll)
9	FW	CRO	Leon Benko (from (Croatia) HNK Rijeka)
11	FW	BRA	Bruno Meneghel (from Qingdao Jonoon)
16	FW	CHN	Nan Yunqi (loan return from Shenyang Shenbei)
18	FW	CHN	Wang Jinxian (loan return from Liaoning Youth U18)
23	GK	CHN	Chen Junlin (loan return from Liaoning Youth U20)
25	MF	IRQ	Nashat Akram (from (Iraq) Al Shorta SC)
28	MF	CHN	Yue Xin (loan return from Liaoning Youth U18)
30	DF	CHN	Han Xuegeng (from Liaoning Whowin)
31	DF	CHN	Wang Yaopeng (loan return from Liaoning Youth U18)
39	MF	CHN	Zhang Jiaqi (from (France) Le Mans FC)
54	MF	CHN	Wang Shixin (loan return from Shenyang Shenbei)
-	FW	CHN	Li Zhichao (loan return from Lijiang Jiayunhao)
-	DF	GHA	Lee Addy (loan return from (Croatia) Dinamo Zagreb)
-	DF	CHN	Sun Haosheng (loan return from Guizhou Zhicheng)
-	DF	CHN	Jiang Wenjun (loan return from Qingdao Hainiu)
-	MF	CHN	Xue Ya'nan (loan return from Qingdao Hainiu)
-	MF	CHN	Wang Xuanhong (loan return from Qingdao Hainiu)
-	GK	CHN	Yu Ziqian (loan return from Qingdao Hainiu)

Out:

No.	Pos.	Nation	Player
3	DF	CHN	Zhao Hejing (to Beijing Guoan)
8	MF	BRA	Fábio Rochemback (Released)
9	FW	FRA	Guillaume Hoarau (to (France) Bordeaux)
15	FW	MAR	Nabil Baha (Released)
16	DF	AUS	Daniel Mullen (to (Australia) Western Sydney Wanderers)
19	FW	CHN	Dong Xuesheng (to Guangzhou Evergrande)
20	MF	MLI	Seydou Keita (to (Spain) Valencia CF)
27	DF	CHN	Liu Yu (to Chongqing Lifan)
28	DF	CHN	Chen Lei (to Chongqing Lifan)
31	GK	CHN	Wang Jingping (to Harbin Yiteng)
34	MF	CHN	Wang Jun (to Qingdao Jonoon)
43	MF	CHN	Li Zhichao (to Beijing Baxy)
48	DF	CHN	Zhang Shuhao (Released)
49	MF	CHN	Lü Yuefeng (to Harbin Yiteng)
51	DF	CHN	Qu Jiachen (Released)
54	FW	CHN	Xie Hui (Released)
55	MF	CHN	Li Qi (to Shenyang Dongjin)
57	DF	CHN	Yang Fan (Released)
59	MF	CHN	Han Sipei (Released)
60	MF	CHN	Zhang Linguang (Released)
62	DF	CHN	Wang Peng (to Shijiazhuang Yongchang)
-	MF	CHN	Gao Jianxuan (to Harbin Yiteng)
-	DF	GHA	Lee Addy (to (Croatia) Dinamo Zagreb)
-	DF	CHN	Sun Haosheng (to Shijiazhuang Yongchang)
-	DF	CHN	Jiang Wenjun (to Qingdao Hainiu)
-	MF	CHN	Xue Ya'nan (to Qingdao Hainiu)
-	MF	CHN	Wang Xuanhong (to Qingdao Hainiu)
-	GK	CHN	Yu Ziqian (to Qingdao Hainiu)

=== Guangzhou Evergrande ===
In:

No.	Pos.	Nation	Player
3	DF	CHN	Mei Fang (from Wuhan Zall)
8	MF	BRA	Renê Júnior (from (Brazil) Tombense)
17	MF	CHN	Liu Jian (from Qingdao Jonoon)
18	FW	CHN	Dong Xuesheng (from Dalian Aerbin)
21	MF	CHN	Peng Xinli (loan return from Chengdu Blades)
23	MF	ITA	Alessandro Diamanti (from (Italy) Bologna)
40	DF	CHN	Hu Bowen (from Shanghai East Asia)
42	GK	CHN	Zhao Tianci (from Beijing Guoan)
45	DF	CHN	Hu Bao (from Shanghai Youth U18)
48	MF	CHN	Wang Yifeng (from Hubei Youth U18)
59	DF	CHN	Li Jianbin (loan return from Shanghai Shenhua)
-	FW	BRA	Cléo (loan return from (Japan) Kashiwa Reysol)
-	DF	CHN	Zhang Yujia (loan return from Meizhou Kejia)
-	DF	CHN	Li Weixin (loan return from Meixian Hakka)
-	MF	CHN	Zhang Xingbo (loan return from Meixian Hakka)
-	MF	CHN	Wang Rui (loan return from Meixian Hakka)
-	DF	CHN	Tu Dongxu (loan return from Meizhou Kejia)
-	FW	CHN	Ye Weichao (loan return from Meizhou Kejia)
-	MF	BRA	Renato Cajá (loan return from (Brazil) Vitória)
-	DF	BRA	Paulão (loan return from (Brazil) Cruzeiro)

Out:

No.	Pos.	Nation	Player
1	GK	CHN	Yang Jun (to Shenyang Zhongze)
3	DF	CHN	Yi Teng (loan to Liaoning Whowin)
15	MF	ARG	Darío Conca (to (Brazil) Fluminense)
20	FW	CHN	Ni Bo (loan to Shenyang Zhongze)
23	MF	CHN	Li Zhilang (loan to Meizhou Kejia)
24	MF	CHN	Shi Hongjun (loan to Meizhou Kejia)
26	MF	CHN	Li Bin (loan to Yinchuan Helanshan)
27	FW	CHN	Ye Weichao (loan to Guangdong Sunray Cave)
31	DF	CHN	Zhang Hongnan (loan to Qingdao Hainiu)
35	FW	CHN	Shewket Yalqun (loan to Qingdao Hainiu)
44	DF	CHN	Kuang Haokun (Released)
48	DF	CHN	Lin Jiawei (Released)
50	MF	CHN	Zhong Yecheng (Released)
51	MF	CHN	Shen Qi'an (Released)
52	MF	CHN	Cai Haojian (Released)
56	FW	CHN	Li Shaokang (Released)
58	MF	CHN	Li Shunxiang (Released)
-	DF	CHN	Zhang Yujia (loan to Guizhou Zhicheng)
-	DF	CHN	Li Weixin (loan to Meizhou Kejia)
-	MF	CHN	Zhang Xingbo (loan to Taiyuan Zhongyou Jiayi)
-	MF	CHN	Wang Rui (loan to Qingdao Hainiu)
-	DF	CHN	Tu Dongxu (loan to Guangdong Sunray Cave)
-	MF	BRA	Renato Cajá (loan to (Turkey) Bursaspor)
-	DF	BRA	Paulão (to (Brazil) Internacional)
-	FW	BRA	Cléo (Released)

=== Guangzhou R&F ===
In:

No.	Pos.	Nation	Player
8	MF	KOR	Park Jong-Woo (from (South Korea) Busan IPark)
9	FW	MAR	Abderrazak Hamdallah (from (Norway) Aalesunds)
11	MF	CHN	Jiang Zhipeng (from Shanghai Shenxin)
12	MF	CHN	Zhang Shichang (from Shenzhen Ruby)
15	DF	KOR	Jang Hyun-Soo (from (Japan) FC Tokyo)
19	MF	CHN	Wang Xiaolong (from Beijing Guoan)
27	FW	DEN	Ken Ilsø (from (Germany) VfL Bochum)
28	DF	CHN	Gao Jiulong (loan return from Shenyang Dongjin)
36	MF	CHN	Zhu Baojie (from Shanghai Shenxin)
42	DF	CHN	Zeng Chao (from Shandong Luneng)
47	MF	CHN	Tang Xin (from Qinghai Senke)
48	DF	CHN	Hu Yongfa (from Shenzhen Fengpeng)
49	MF	CHN	Wang Xuankai (from Hangzhou Greentown)
52	MF	CHN	Liang Yanfeng (loan return from Shenyang Dongjin)
57	MF	CHN	Ju Feng (from Liaoning Youth U18)
-	MF	CHN	Yu Guijun (loan return from Qingdao Hainiu)

Out:

No.	Pos.	Nation	Player
4	DF	CHN	Li Wenbo (to Shanghai Shenhua)
11	FW	BRA	Rafael Coelho (to Changchun Yatai)
12	GK	CHN	Shi Xiaotian (to Liaoning Whowin)
19	MF	CHN	Pan Chi (to Nanjing Qianbao)
21	MF	CHN	Gao Zengxiang (to Shijiazhuang Yongchang)
22	MF	CHN	Wang Zihua (to Shenzhen Ruby)
24	MF	CHN	Li Lingwei (to Meixian Hakka)
25	FW	NGA	Yakubu (to (Qatar) Al Rayyan)
30	DF	AUS	Eddy Bosnar (to (Australia) Central Coast Mariners)
35	MF	AUS	Rostyn Griffiths (to (Australia) Perth Glory)
36	FW	CHN	Men Yang (to Yinchuan Helanshan)
39	MF	CHN	Yu Guijun (to Qingdao Hainiu)
47	GK	CHN	Sun Ce (Released)
49	MF	CHN	Chen Tang (Released)
52	MF	CHN	Chen Qi (Released)
56	MF	CHN	Li Zhiheng (Released)
57	MF	CHN	Lin Liangming (Released)
58	MF	CHN	Huang Jingbin (Released)
59	DF	CHN	Chen Fuhai (Released)
60	FW	CHN	Ma Junliang (Released)

=== Guizhou Renhe ===
In:

No.	Pos.	Nation	Player
1	GK	CHN	Xu Jiamin (loan return from Shanghai Youth U20)
7	MF	POL	Krzysztof Mączyński (from (Poland) Górnik Zabrze)
11	MF	BRA	Hyuri (from (Brazil) Audax)
13	FW	CHN	Shi Liang (loan return from Meizhou Kejia)
16	FW	CHN	Wu Dingmao (from Harbin Yiteng)
18	DF	CHN	Zhao Jun (from Beijing Baxy)
20	FW	CHN	Zhang Chengxiang (loan return from Shaanxi Laochenggen)
28	FW	CHN	Ge Yuxiang (from Shijiazhuang Yongchang)
30	FW	CHN	Shen Tianfeng (loan return from Chongqing FC)
33	MF	CHN	Guo Sheng (loan return from Shijiazhuang Yongchang)
37	DF	CHN	Yu Rui (loan return from Hebei Zhongji)
39	FW	CHN	Chen Zijie (loan return from Hebei Zhongji)
41	MF	CHN	Yu Bin (loan return from Shaanxi Laochenggen)
42	MF	CHN	Yu Wenhe (loan return from Shaanxi Laochenggen)
-	GK	CHN	Chen Nancun (loan return from Shaanxi Laochenggen)
-	MF	CHN	Zhou Zihao (loan return from Shaanxi Laochenggen)
-	DF	CHN	Li Boyang (loan return from Shaanxi Laochenggen)
-	FW	CHN	Liu Yang (loan return from Shaanxi Laochenggen)
-	DF	CHN	Gao zhenzhe (loan return from Shaanxi Laochenggen)
-	MF	CHN	Yang Lei (loan return from Shaanxi Laochenggen)
-	MF	CHN	Li Shuai (loan return from Shaanxi Laochenggen)
-	DF	CHN	Zheng Bo (loan return from Shaanxi Laochenggen)
-	MF	CHN	Xu Xiang (loan return from Shaanxi Laochenggen)
-	DF	CHN	Liu Shiyu (loan return from Shaanxi Laochenggen)
-	DF	CHN	Jing Guodong (loan return from Shaanxi Laochenggen)
-	MF	CHN	Liao Linkun (loan return from Shaanxi Laochenggen)
-	DF	CHN	Li Kai (loan return from Qingdao Hainiu)
-	DF	CHN	Liu Qing (loan return from Qingdao Hainiu)
-	MF	CHN	Wang Erzhuo (loan return from Chengdu Tiancheng)

Out:

No.	Pos.	Nation	Player
1	GK	CHN	Shen Jun (to Shanghai Shenhua)
5	DF	CHN	Wu Wei (to Hangzhou Greentown)
7	DF	ESP	Nano (Retired)
11	FW	ESP	Rafa Jordà (to (Italy) A.C. Siena)
13	FW	CHN	Shi Liang (loan to Meizhou Kejia)
16	MF	CHN	Yan Xiangchuang (Released)
18	DF	CHN	Lu Qiang (to Henan Jianye)
25	DF	CHN	Li Kai (to Qingdao Hainiu)
41	MF	CHN	Zhu Zhengyu (loan to Taiyuan Zhongyou Jiayi)
42	DF	CHN	Yang Fan (loan to Taiyuan Zhongyou Jiayi)
43	MF	CHN	Huang Hui (Released)
44	MF	CHN	Zhang Yuxuan (loan to Taiyuan Zhongyou Jiayi)
45	GK	CHN	Zhang Chao (Released)
46	DF	CHN	Deng Hanwen (loan to Taiyuan Zhongyou Jiayi)
48	DF	CHN	Zhao Chengle (to Shijiazhuang Yongchang)
49	MF	CHN	Ren Chenchao (loan to Taiyuan Zhongyou Jiayi)
50	FW	CHN	Lei-Lu Dekun (loan to Taiyuan Zhongyou Jiayi)
51	FW	CHN	Xu Li'ao (loan to Taiyuan Zhongyou Jiayi)
52	DF	CHN	Shi Jiwei (loan to Taiyuan Zhongyou Jiayi)
54	MF	CHN	Luo Andong (loan to Taiyuan Zhongyou Jiayi)
55	MF	CHN	Hu Hao (loan to Taiyuan Zhongyou Jiayi)
57	DF	CHN	Huang Gengji (loan to Taiyuan Zhongyou Jiayi)
58	DF	CHN	Meng Chao (loan to Taiyuan Zhongyou Jiayi)
59	DF	CHN	Jiang Dongnan (Released)
-	GK	CHN	Chen Nancun (loan to Taiyuan Zhongyou Jiayi)
-	MF	CHN	Zhou Zihao (loan to Taiyuan Zhongyou Jiayi)
-	DF	CHN	Li Boyang (loan to Taiyuan Zhongyou Jiayi)
-	FW	CHN	Liu Yang (loan to Taiyuan Zhongyou Jiayi)
-	DF	CHN	Gao zhenzhe (Released)
-	MF	CHN	Yang Lei (loan to Lijiang Jiayunhao)
-	MF	CHN	Li Shuai (loan to Yinchuan Helanshan)
-	DF	CHN	Zheng Bo (Released)
-	MF	CHN	Xu Xiang (Released)
-	DF	CHN	Liu Shiyu (Released)
-	DF	CHN	Jing Guodong (Released)
-	MF	CHN	Liao Linkun (loan to Taiyuan Zhongyou Jiayi)
-	DF	CHN	Liu Qing (to Qingdao Hainiu)
-	MF	CHN	Wang Erzhuo (loan to Sichuan Longfor)

=== Hangzhou Greentown ===
In:

No.	Pos.	Nation	Player
6	DF	KOR	Son Dae-Ho (from (South Korea) Incheon United)
7	FW	BRA	Gilberto Macena (from Shandong Luneng)
9	FW	BRA	Anselmo Ramon (loan from (Brazil) Cruzeiro)
32	DF	CHN	Wu Wei (from Guizhou Renhe)
36	MF	CHN	Yang Zezhi (from Chengdu Tiancheng)
-	FW	JPN	Masashi Oguro (from (Japan) Yokohama F. Marinos)

Out:

No.	Pos.	Nation	Player
2	DF	CHN	Song Zhiwei (to Wuhan Zall)
3	DF	KOR	Kim Dong-Jin (to (Thailand) Muangthong United)
6	FW	CHN	Gao Di (loan return to Shandong Luneng)
9	FW	BRA	Mazola (loan return to (Brazil) São Paulo)
11	FW	JPN	Masashi Oguro (loan to (Japan) Kyoto Sanga)
12	MF	CHN	Wang Xiao (Released)
15	MF	CHN	Niu Xiucheng (loan to Shenzhen Ruby)
17	FW	CHN	Yang Zi (to Shenyang Zhongze)
18	MF	CHN	Wang Kai (Released)
19	MF	CHN	Tang Jiashu (loan to Shanghai Shenxin)
23	MF	CHN	Huang Fengtao (to Shijiazhuang Yongchang)
24	DF	CHN	Liu Bin (to Shanghai Shenhua)
26	MF	CHN	Yang Jinxian (Released)
29	GK	CHN	Jiang Bo (loan to Beijing Baxy)
30	GK	CHN	Teng Shangkun (to Qingdao Hainiu)
35	MF	CHN	Yang Ke (Released)
41	MF	CHN	Wang Xuankai (to Guangzhou R&F)
42	FW	CHN	Fang Zhengyang (Released)
43	MF	CHN	Zheng Jie (Released)
44	MF	CHN	Wang Zhipeng (to Beijing BIT)
48	MF	CHN	Hui Ge (loan to Lijiang Jiayunhao)
49	FW	CHN	Zhou Dongfang (Released)
60	FW	CHN	Lü Dechen (Released)

=== Harbin Yiteng ===
In:

No.	Pos.	Nation	Player
2	DF	CHN	Yu Tao (Free Agent)
3	DF	KOR	Noh Hyung-Goo (from (Japan) Roasso Kumamoto)
10	FW	BRA	Dori (loan from (Brazil) Fluminense FC)
26	GK	CHN	Wang Jingping (from Dalian Aerbin)
28	FW	CHN	Tan Long (from (United States) Orlando City)
30	MF	CHN	Gao Jianxuan (from Dalian Aerbin)
31	MF	CHN	Wu Teng (from Tianjin Locomotive)
35	MF	CHN	Lü Yuefeng (from Dalian Aerbin)
-	MF	CHN	Xian Tao (loan return from Hebei Zhongji)
-	DF	CHN	Niu Xilong (loan return from Lijiang Jiayunhao)
-	FW	CHN	Wu Dingmao (loan return from Hebei Zhongji)

Out:

No.	Pos.	Nation	Player
3	DF	CHN	Niu Xilong (to Nanjing Qianbao)
13	DF	CHN	Chen Zhiming (Released)
22	GK	CHN	Chen Yongxin (to Dalian Transcendence)
26	DF	CHN	Lu Enchuang (Released)
31	MF	CHN	Li Gen (to Wuhan Zall)
-	FW	CHN	Wu Dingmao (to Guizhou Renhe)
-	MF	CHN	Xian Tao (to Jiangxi Liansheng)

=== Henan Jianye ===
In:

No.	Pos.	Nation	Player
9	FW	JAM	Ryan Johnson (from (United States) Portland Timbers)
12	DF	CHN	Lu Qiang (from Guizhou Renhe)
16	MF	CHN	Yang Kuo (from Shandong Luneng)
17	DF	KOR	Lee Ji-Nam (from (South Korea) Daegu FC)
20	FW	BRA	Rafael Marques (from (Brazil) Botafogo)
22	MF	CHN	Zhu Yifan (from Beijing Guoan)
31	GK	CHN	Luo Zuqing (from Guangdong Sunray Cave)
40	MF	CHN	Mirahmetjan Muzepper (from Shandong Luneng)
56	MF	CHN	Wang Haozhi (loan return from Hebei Zhongji)
-	MF	CHN	Zi Long (loan return from Hebei Zhongji)
-	DF	CHN	Wang Hailong (loan return from Meixian Hakka)
-	DF	CHN	Luo Heng (loan return from Jiangxi Liansheng)
-	DF	CHN	Lu Yao (loan return from Shandong Tengding)

Out:

No.	Pos.	Nation	Player
11	FW	ZAM	Christopher Katongo (to (South Africa) Golden Arrows)
12	DF	CHN	Ma Chongchong (loan to Chengdu Tiancheng)
17	DF	CHN	Li Zhaonan (loan to Hunan Billows)
21	MF	CHN	He Bin (loan to Chengdu Blades)
22	MF	CHN	Zhu Yifan (loan return to Beijing Guoan)
33	FW	HKG	Godfred Karikari (to Shenzhen Ruby)
35	GK	CHN	Li Ya'nan (loan to Sichuan Leaders)
49	FW	CHN	Fan Chenyao (Released)
51	DF	CHN	Huang Zhengyan (Released)
52	DF	CHN	Shang Wei (Released)
54	MF	CHN	Wang Ke (loan to Shandong Tengding)
55	DF	CHN	Zhou Min (Released)
56	DF	CHN	Liu Dongyang (Released)
57	MF	CHN	Sun Rui (Released)
61	DF	CHN	Li Di (Released)
-	MF	CHN	Zi Long (to Nanjing Qianbao)
-	DF	CHN	Wang Hailong (Released)
-	DF	CHN	Luo Heng (loan to Sichuan Leaders)
-	DF	CHN	Lu Yao (loan to Sichuan Leaders)
-	FW	CHN	Wang Haoyu (loan to Sichuan Leaders)

=== Jiangsu Sainty ===
In:

No.	Pos.	Nation	Player
6	MF	LBN	Roda Antar (from Shandong Luneng)
10	FW	MNE	Dejan Damjanović (from (South Korea) FC Seoul)
11	FW	BRA	Elias (from (Brazil) Resende)
30	DF	KOR	Yoon Sin-Young (from (South Korea) Gyeongnam FC)
43	DF	CHN	Li Shizhou (from Liaoning Youth U18)
52	DF	CHN	Zhong Yi (from Hubei Youth U18)
-	MF	CHN	Tang Miao (loan return from Shenzhen Fengpeng)
-	MF	CHN	Ye Hui (loan return from Dali Ruilong)
-	MF	CHN	Wang Jie (loan return from Shenzhen Fengpeng)
-	MF	CHN	Sun Xiang (loan return from Qingdao Hainiu)
-	MF	CHN	Liu Qing (loan return from Hunan Billows)

Out:

No.	Pos.	Nation	Player
6	DF	CHN	Jiang Jiajun (to Shanghai Shenxin)
7	FW	CHN	Bari Mamatil (loan to Xinjiang Tianshan Leopard)
10	FW	ROU	Cristian Dănălache (to Qingdao Jonoon)
11	FW	ALB	Hamdi Salihi (to (Israel) Hapoel Ironi Acre)
13	MF	CHN	Wang Jie (to Tianjin Songjiang)
14	MF	CHN	Tang Miao (to Nanjing Qianbao)
15	FW	CHN	Ge Wei (loan to Jiangxi Liansheng)
19	MF	CHN	Qian Zhelong (Released)
25	MF	CHN	Ye Hui (Released)
27	MF	CHN	Wang Guanyu (Released)
29	MF	CHN	Liu Ji (to Guizhou Zhicheng)
33	DF	CHN	Xiong Tao (to Jiangxi Liansheng)
35	MF	CHN	Zhu Chao (to Nanjing Qianbao)
36	MF	CHN	Sun Xiang (to Shandong Tengding)
38	FW	SRB	Aleksandar Jevtić (to Liaoning Whowin)
39	DF	UZB	Kamoliddin Tajiev (to (Uzbekistan) Pakhtakor Tashkent)
-	MF	CHN	Liu Qing (to Tianjin Songjiang)

=== Liaoning Whowin ===
In:

No.	Pos.	Nation	Player
2	DF	CHN	Zhang Tianlong (from Shenzhen Ruby)
10	FW	BEL	Kevin Oris (from (South Korea) Jeonbuk Hyundai Motors)
14	MF	AUS	Billy Celeski (from (United Arab Emirates) Al-Shaab)
16	DF	UZB	Artyom Filiposyan (from (Uzbekistan) Bunyodkor PFK)
18	DF	CHN	Yi Teng (loan from Guangzhou Evergrande)
19	MF	CHN	Qu Xiaohui (loan return from Lijiang Jiayunhao)
21	FW	SRB	Aleksandar Jevtić (from Jiangsu Sainty)
25	DF	CHN	Xu Wanquan (loan return from Xinjiang Youth U20)
31	FW	CHN	Ji Chao (loan return from Qingdao Hainiu)
32	MF	CHN	Ding Haifeng (from Shenzhen Ruby)
36	GK	CHN	Shi Xiaotian (from Guangzhou R&F)
39	DF	CHN	Zhang Yonghai (from Beijing Guoan)
47	MF	CHN	Feng Boyuan (from Beijing Youth U18)
53	MF	CHN	Zhang Yanjun (loan return from Xinjiang Youth U20)
60	DF	CHN	Song Chen (loan return from Qinghai Senke)
-	MF	CHN	Lu Qichao (loan return from Xinjiang Youth U20)
-	MF	CHN	Zhang Jianming (loan return from Xinjiang Youth U20)
-	DF	CHN	Du Wenyang (loan return from Shandong Tengding)
-	DF	CHN	Han Xuegeng (loan return from Lijiang Jiayunhao)

Out:

No.	Pos.	Nation	Player
2	DF	UZB	Shavkat Mullajanov (to (Uzbekistan) Olmaliq FK)
10	FW	BRA	Edu (to (Japan) FC Tokyo)
14	FW	SRB	Miloš Trifunović (to (Kazakhstan) FC Atyrau)
19	MF	ARG	Pablo Brandán (to (Israel) Beitar Jerusalem)
24	MF	CHN	Hao Yonghe (loan to Shenyang Zhongze)
26	GK	CHN	Zhu Zilin (loan to Taiyuan Zhongyou Jiayi)
43	MF	CHN	Tao Siyu (loan to Quanzhou Broncos)
46	MF	CHN	Liu Tiankuo (loan to Quanzhou Broncos)
48	MF	CHN	He Yaqi (Released)
50	MF	CHN	Yang Jin (to Quanzhou Broncos)
52	FW	CHN	Xiao Qi (Released)
53	MF	CHN	Yang Lianfeng (Released)
57	DF	CHN	Liu Jiaxin (Released)
59	DF	CHN	Wang Jiawang (Released)
60	GK	CHN	Wang Guanghui (Released)
-	MF	CHN	Lu Qichao (Released)
-	MF	CHN	Zhang Jianming (Released)
-	DF	CHN	Du Wenyang (loan to Dalian Transcendence)
-	DF	CHN	Han Xuegeng (to Dalian Aerbin)

=== Shandong Luneng ===
In:

No.	Pos.	Nation	Player
6	DF	CHN	Zhao Mingjian (loan return from Changchun Yatai)
13	FW	CHN	Zhang Wenzhao (from Changchun Yatai)
15	MF	BRA	Junior Urso (from (Brazil) Coritiba)
23	MF	CHN	Li Wei (loan return from Wuhan Zall)
25	GK	CHN	Wang Dalei (from Shanghai Shenhua)
30	MF	ARG	Walter Montillo (from (Brazil) Santos FC)
31	FW	BRA	Aloísio (from (Brazil) Tombense)
35	DF	CHN	Dai Lin (from Shanghai Shenhua)
-	FW	CHN	Yang Chen (loan return from Shandong Tengding)
-	MF	CHN	Ma Xingyu (loan return from Qingdao Hainiu)
-	MF	CHN	Zhou Haibin (loan return from Tianjin Teda)
-	DF	CHN	Otkur Hasan (loan return from Shijiazhuang Yongchang)
-	FW	CHN	Gao Di (loan return from Hangzhou Greentown)
-	FW	BRA	Obina (loan return from (Brazil) Bahia)

Out:

No.	Pos.	Nation	Player
6	MF	CHN	Zhou Haibin (to Tianjin Teda)
10	MF	ARG	Leonardo Pisculichi (to (Argentina) Argentinos Juniors)
12	GK	CHN	Geng Xiaofeng (loan to Shanghai Shenhua)
14	MF	CHN	Mirahmetjan Muzepper (to Henan Jianye)
15	DF	CHN	Yuan Weiwei (to Tianjin Teda)
18	MF	LBN	Roda Antar (to Jiangsu Sainty)
25	DF	CHN	Liu Yang (to Wuhan Zall)
26	MF	CHN	Xia Ningning (to Tianjin Songjiang)
29	FW	BRA	Gilberto Macena (to Hangzhou Greentown)
31	MF	CHN	Ma Long (loan to Qingdao Hainiu)
32	MF	CHN	Ma Xingyu (to Qingdao Hainiu)
35	MF	CHN	Sun Dong (to Shandong Tengding)
37	DF	CHN	Otkur Hasan (to Hebei Zhongji)
41	FW	CHN	Yang Chen (to Shandong Tengding)
44	MF	CHN	Yang Kuo (to Henan Jianye)
47	MF	CHN	Du Yuxin (Released)
51	DF	CHN	Zeng Chao (to Guangzhou R&F)
52	DF	CHN	Zhu Xiaojian (to Beijing Baxy)
53	MF	CHN	Zheng Fengwei (to Qingdao Hainiu)
-	FW	CHN	Gao Di (to Shanghai Shenhua)
-	FW	BRA	Obina (to (Brazil) América-MG)

=== Shanghai Shenhua ===
In:

No.	Pos.	Nation	Player
1	GK	CHN	Geng Xiaofeng (loan from Shandong Luneng)
3	DF	HKG	Brian Fok (Free Agent)
5	DF	KOR	Cho Byung-Kuk (from (Japan) Júbilo Iwata)
6	DF	CHN	Li Wenbo (from Guangzhou R&F)
8	MF	CHN	Fan Lingjiang (loan return from Jiangxi Liansheng)
9	FW	COL	Luis Carlos Ruiz (from (Colombia) Junior F.C.)
13	DF	BRA	Paulo André (from (Brazil) Corinthians)
14	DF	CHN	Gu Bin (loan return from Chongqing F.C.)
17	MF	TPE	Chen Po-liang (from Shenzhen Ruby)
18	FW	CHN	Gao Di (from Shandong Luneng)
24	GK	CHN	Shen Jun (from Guizhou Renhe)
25	MF	CHN	Su Shun (loan return from Dali Ruilong)
27	DF	CHN	Han Yi (from Liaoning Youth U20)
30	DF	CHN	Tao Jin (loan return from Hunan Billows)
42	GK	CHN	Dong Hang (loan return from Dali Ruilong)
45	MF	CHN	Li Lianxiang (from Tianjin Locomotive)
46	DF	CHN	Liang Wei (from Tianjin Locomotive)
47	FW	CHN	Wu Changqi (from Tianjin Locomotive)
48	MF	CHN	Xiao Bang (from Tianjin Locomotive)
49	MF	CHN	Yan Ge (from Shandong Youth)
50	MF	CHN	Xie Fuquan (from Shandong Youth)
51	MF	CHN	Huang Linghao (from Zhejiang Youth U18)
56	DF	CHN	Cui Qi (from Guizhou Zhicheng)
57	MF	CHN	Liu Jiawei (from Guangzhou R&F)
58	FW	CHN	Wang Junchao (from Dali Ruilong)
59	MF	CHN	Chen Tao (from Beijing Youth U18)
60	MF	CHN	Shang Yin (loan return from Jiangxi Liansheng)
-	FW	CHN	Xu Qi (loan return from Dali Ruilong)
-	DF	CHN	Luo Xi (from Shenzhen Ruby)
-	DF	CHN	Liu Bin (from Hangzhou Greentown)

Out:

No.	Pos.	Nation	Player
1	GK	CHN	Wang Dalei (to Shandong Luneng Taishan)
2	DF	ARG	Rolando Schiavi (Retired)
4	DF	CHN	Li Jianbin (loan return to Guangzhou Evergrande)
5	DF	CHN	Dai Lin (to Shandong Luneng Taishan)
8	MF	CHN	Song Boxuan (to Beijing Guoan)
9	FW	CPV	Dady (to Xinjiang Tianshan Leopard)
13	MF	CHN	Wang Yang (Released)
18	MF	MAS	Tam Sheang Tsung (to (Japan) Avispa Fukuoka)
27	MF	ARG	Patricio Toranzo (to (Argentina) Huracán)
29	MF	CHN	Wang Zhenyu (Released)
33	MF	CHN	Yan Song (to Dalian Transcendence)
41	MF	CHN	Bai Xuefeng (Released)
42	MF	CHN	Pan Jiyuan (Released)
43	DF	CHN	Cheng Zecheng (Released)
45	DF	CHN	Yang Yufan (Released)
46	MF	CHN	Li Hao (Released)
47	MF	CHN	Gu Xiaodong (Released)
48	MF	CHN	Wang Chen (Released)
49	GK	CHN	Zhou Ye (Released)
50	DF	CHN	Jin Chenchen (Released)
51	MF	CHN	Abdugheni Emeti (Released)
52	MF	CHN	Tong Lei (loan to Sichuan Leaders)
53	MF	CHN	Xu Junjie (loan to Sichuan Longfor)
55	DF	CHN	Sun Gang (Released)
60	DF	CHN	Liu Yuyu (Released)
-	FW	CHN	Xu Qi (Released)
-	DF	CHN	Luo Xi (loan to Beijing Baxy)
-	DF	CHN	Liu Bin (loan to Beijing Baxy)

=== Shanghai Shenxin ===
In:

No.	Pos.	Nation	Player
2	DF	CHN	Jiang Jiajun (from Jiangsu Sainty)
4	DF	CHN	Sun Kai (from Shanghai East Asia)
5	MF	CHN	Tang Jiashu (loan from Hangzhou Greentown)
6	MF	CHN	Hou Junjie (Shanghai Youth U20)
11	FW	MNE	Radomir Đalović (from (Iran) Sepahan)
17	DF	KOR	Lim You-Hwan (from (South Korea) Jeonbuk Hyundai Motors)
19	MF	CHN	Wu Yizhen (from Shanghai East Asia)
23	MF	CHN	Duan Jieyi (from Shenyang Dongjin)
30	MF	CHN	Chen Wei (from Jiangsu Youth U20)
37	MF	CHN	Wang Bo (loan return from Hubei China-Kyle)
48	FW	CHN	Li Hongxin (from Yunnan Youth U18)
50	DF	CHN	Pu Hongyuan (from Yunnan Youth U18)
56	DF	CHN	Hu Mingfei (from Jiangsu Youth U20)
57	DF	CHN	Zheng Guangqi (from Shandong Youth)
58	FW	CHN	Zhang Wentao (from Shanghai Dongya)
59	MF	CHN	Tan Fucheng (from Tianjin Youth U18)
60	FW	CHN	He Qiyuan (from Chongqing Youth U18)
-	DF	CHN	Yang Chen (loan return from Hebei Zhongji)
-	DF	CHN	Wang Jian (loan return from Qingdao Hainiu)
-	MF	CHN	Chen Zhizhao (loan return from (Brazil) Corinthians)

Out:

No.	Pos.	Nation	Player
2	FW	CHN	Mao Jianqing (loan return to Beijing Guoan)
6	DF	AUS	Michael Marrone (to (Australia) Adelaide United)
10	FW	CHN	Wang Jiayu (to Shanghai East Asia)
11	MF	CHN	Jiang Zhipeng (to Guangzhou R&F)
14	MF	CHN	Song Xingyi (Released)
23	FW	BRA	Antônio Flávio (to (Brazil) Ponte Preta)
38	DF	CHN	Sun Yifan (to Meizhou Kejia)
29	DF	CHN	Zhang Yonghai (loan return to Beijing Guoan)
33	MF	CHN	Zhu Baojie (to Guangzhou R&F)
39	DF	CHN	Zou Xiang (Released)
48	DF	CHN	Li Tong (Released)
49	MF	CHN	Ma Yujie (Released)
-	DF	CHN	Yang Chen (to Meizhou Kejia)
-	DF	CHN	Wang Jian (to Qingdao Hainiu)
-	MF	CHN	Chen Zhizhao (to Beijing Guoan)

=== Shanghai SIPG ===
In:

No.	Pos.	Nation	Player
9	FW	SWE	Tobias Hysén (from (Sweden) IFK Göteborg)
20	FW	CHN	Wang Jiayu (from Shanghai Shenxin)
36	FW	AUS	Daniel McBreen (from (Australia) Central Coast Mariners)

Out:

No.	Pos.	Nation	Player
2	DF	CHN	Li Yunqiu (to Beijing Guoan)
9	FW	COL	Luis Carlos Cabezas (to Hunan Billows)
14	FW	AUS	Bernie Ibini-Isei (loan to (Australia) Central Coast Mariners)
16	MF	CHN	Geng Jiaqi (to Hebei Zhongji)
18	DF	CHN	Sun Kai (to Shanghai Shenxin)
20	FW	CHN	Mao Jiakang (loan to Hunan Billows)
26	MF	CHN	Wu Yizhen (to Shanghai Shenxin)
27	DF	CHN	Hu Bowen (to Guangzhou Evergrande)
36	FW	AUS	Daniel McBreen (loan return to (Australia) Central Coast Mariners)
43	DF	CHN	Li Tianchen (to Chongqing Lifan)
44	DF	CHN	Yang Guiyan (to Beijing Baxy)
49	FW	CHN	Zhang Wentao (to Shanghai Shenxin)
50	MF	CHN	Sun Yashu (Released)
51	MF	CHN	Hao Shuai (to Hunan Billows)
53	MF	CHN	Yun Zhihai (Released)
55	DF	CHN	Chen Kejiang (Released)
57	MF	CHN	Xiao Mingjie (Released)
58	FW	CHN	Chen Minghui (Released)

=== Tianjin Teda ===
In:

No.	Pos.	Nation	Player
16	DF	LBN	Mohammed Ali Khan (from (Sweden) BK Häcken)
27	DF	CHN	Yuan Weiwei (from Shandong Luneng)
33	MF	CHN	Zhou Haibin (from Shandong Luneng)
-	DF	CHN	Mao Kaiyu (loan return from Shenyang Zhongze)
-	FW	CHN	Fan Zhiqiang (loan return from Shenzhen Fengpeng)
-	GK	CHN	Lu Zheyu (loan return from Shenzhen Fengpeng)
-	DF	CHN	Cai Xi (loan return from Shenzhen Fengpeng)
-	FW	CHN	Fan Baiqun (loan return from Tianjin Songjiang)
-	MF	CHN	Zhao Yingjie (loan return from Tianjin Songjiang)
-	MF	CHN	Li Yaoyue (loan return from Qingdao Hainiu)
-	FW	CHN	Du Junpeng (loan return from Dali Ruilong)
-	MF	CHN	Jia Yudong (loan return from Hebei Zhongji)

Out:

No.	Pos.	Nation	Player
14	FW	CHN	Fan Zhiqiang (loan to Tianjin Huaruide)
16	MF	AUS	Erik Paartalu (to (Thailand) Muangthong United)
23	GK	CHN	Lu Zheyu (loan to Tianjin Huaruide)
32	MF	CHN	Yu Xueyi (loan to Tianjin Huaruide)
33	DF	CHN	Cai Xi (to Hubei China-Kyle)
35	MF	CHN	Wang Qiuming (loan to Tianjin Huaruide)
39	MF	CHN	Zhou Haibin (loan return to Shandong Luneng)
47	MF	CHN	Sun Zhengyang (to Chongqing Lifan)
-	DF	CHN	Mao Kaiyu (loan to Yinchuan Helanshan)
-	FW	CHN	Fan Baiqun (loan to Tianjin Songjiang)
-	MF	CHN	Zhao Yingjie (loan to Tianjin Huaruide)
-	MF	CHN	Li Yaoyue (loan to Tianjin Huaruide)
-	FW	CHN	Du Junpeng (loan to Tianjin Huaruide)
-	MF	CHN	Jia Yudong (loan to Tianjin Huaruide)
