= List of Chinese football transfers summer 2013 =

This is a list of Chinese football transfers for the 2013 season summer transfer window. Only moves from Super League and League One are listed. The transfer window will be opened from 1 July 2013 to 25 July 2013.

== Super League ==
=== Beijing Guoan ===
In:

No.	Pos.	Nation	Player
14	DF	HKG	Lee Chi Ho (from (Hong Kong) South China)
15	FW	NGA	Peter Utaka (from Dalian Aerbin)
68	FW	CHN	Zhang Chengdong (from (Portugal) C.D. Mafra)
-	FW	SRB	Andrija Kaluđerović (loan return from (Spain) Racing de Santander)

Out:

No.	Pos.	Nation	Player
9	FW	CHN	Tan Tiancheng (loan to Lijiang Jiayunhao)
14	DF	HKG	Lee Chi Ho (loan to (Hong Kong) South China)
16	DF	CHN	Zhang Junzhe (loan to Shenyang Dongjin)
17	MF	CHN	Xu Wu (loan to Shenyang Dongjin)
23	DF	CHN	Jiang Tao (loan to Meizhou Kejia)
27	DF	CHN	Zhang Yonghai (loan to Shanghai Shenxin)
28	MF	CHN	Zhang Jian (loan to Hebei Zhongji)
30	DF	CHN	Lei Tenglong (loan to (Portugal) Marítimo)
33	FW	CHN	Mao Jianqing (loan to Shanghai Shenxin)
38	FW	BRA	André Lima (loan to (Brazil) Vitória)
47	DF	CHN	Zhang Jizhou (loan to Beijing BIT)
-	FW	SRB	Andrija Kaluđerović (loan to (Serbia) FK Vojvodina)

=== Changchun Yatai ===
In:

No.	Pos.	Nation	Player
20	FW	CZE	Jan Rezek (from (Cyprus) Anorthosis Famagusta)
34	MF	CHN	Yan Feng (from Dalian Aerbin)
35	MF	BRA	Eninho (from (South Korea) Jeonbuk Hyundai Motors)
37	DF	CHN	Zhao Mingjian (loan from Shandong Luneng)
-	MF	CHN	Wang Jinliang (loan return from Shaanxi Laochenggen)

Out:

No.	Pos.	Nation	Player
5	MF	AUS	Matt McKay (to (Australia) Brisbane Roar)
6	MF	CHN	Wang Dong (loan to Shandong Tengding)
9	FW	BRA	Zé Carlos (to (United Arab Emirates) Al Sharjah)
18	MF	CHN	Li Mou (to Chengdu Blades)
-	MF	CHN	Wang Jinliang (to (Portugal) C.D. Mafra)

=== Dalian Aerbin ===
In:

No.	Pos.	Nation	Player
15	DF	MAR	Nabil Baha (Free Agent)
16	DF	AUS	Daniel Mullen (loan return from (Australia) Melbourne Victory)

Out:

No.	Pos.	Nation	Player
11	FW	NGA	Peter Utaka (to Beijing Guoan)
41	MF	CHN	Yan Xiangchuang (to Guizhou Renhe)
43	FW	CHN	Li Zhichao (loan to Lijiang Jiayunhao)
45	MF	CHN	Yan Feng (to Changchun Yatai)
-	MF	CHN	Wang Xuanhong (loan to Qingdao Hainiu)

=== Guangzhou Evergrande ===
In:

No.	Pos.	Nation	Player
12	MF	CHN	Zheng Long (loan from Qingdao Jonoon)

Out:

No.	Pos.	Nation	Player
13	DF	CHN	Tang Dechao (to Henan Jianye)
18	FW	PAR	Lucas Barrios (to (Russia) Spartak Moscow)
25	MF	CHN	Peng Xinli (loan to Chengdu Blades)
27	FW	CHN	Ye Weichao (loan to Meizhou Kejia)
57	DF	CHN	Gong Liangxuan (to Chengdu Blades)

=== Guangzhou R&F ===
In:

No.	Pos.	Nation	Player
30	DF	AUS	Eddy Bosnar (from (South Korea) Suwon Samsung Bluewings)
38	GK	CHN	Zhao Bo (from Hebei Youth)
40	DF	CHN	Fu Yunlong (from Beijing Youth)
49	MF	CHN	Chen Tang (from Yunnan Youth)
50	DF	CHN	Luo Hao (from Yunnan Youth)
51	MF	CHN	Gao Jiarun (from Yunnan Youth)
55	MF	CHN	Ma Jun (from Hubei Youth)

Out:

No.	Pos.	Nation	Player
8	MF	BRA	Jumar (Released)
15	MF	CHN	Liang Yanfeng (loan to Shenyang Dongjin)
27	DF	CHN	Gao Jiulong (loan to Shenyang Dongjin)
28	DF	CHN	Wang Bin (Released)
39	MF	CHN	Yu Guijun (loan to Qingdao Hainiu)
41	FW	CHN	Chang Feiya (Released)
42	DF	CHN	Wang Xinhui (Released)
46	DF	CHN	Xiao Zhilei (Released)

=== Guizhou Renhe ===
In:

No.	Pos.	Nation	Player
16	MF	CHN	Yan Xiangchuang (from Dalian Aerbin)
-	FW	CHN	Shen Tianfeng (loan return from Shaanxi Laochenggen)

Out:

No.	Pos.	Nation	Player
13	FW	CHN	Shi Liang (loan to Meizhou Kejia)
20	FW	CHN	Chen Zijie (loan to Hebei Zhongji)
25	DF	CHN	Li Kai (loan to Qingdao Hainiu)
33	MF	CHN	Guo Sheng (loan to Shijiazhuang Yongchang Junhao)
37	DF	CHN	Yu Rui (loan to Hebei Zhongji)
-	FW	CHN	Shen Tianfeng (loan to Chongqing FC)

=== Hangzhou Greentown ===
In:

No.	Pos.	Nation	Player
61	MF	CHN	Ruan Yang (loan return from (Portugal) Sporting CP B)
66	MF	CHN	Luo Jing (loan return from (Portugal) Oliveirense)
70	MF	SVN	Luka Žinko (from (Azerbaijan) Gabala)

Out:

No.	Pos.	Nation	Player
10	MF	CZE	Marek Jarolím (to (Greece) Iraklis)

=== Jiangsu Sainty ===
In:

No.	Pos.	Nation	Player
40	GK	CHN	Wen Zhixiang (from Tianjin Teda)

Out:

No.	Pos.	Nation	Player
13	MF	CHN	Wang Jie (loan to Shenzhen Fengpeng)
21	MF	BLR	Sergey Krivets (to (Belarus) FC BATE Borisov)
25	MF	CHN	Ye Hui (loan to Dali Ruilong)

=== Liaoning Whowin ===
In:

No.	Pos.	Nation	Player
35	MF	CHN	Zhang Xiaoyu (loan return from Lijiang Jiayunhao)
54	GK	CHN	Mu Qianyu (from Shandong Luneng)

Out:

No.	Pos.	Nation	Player
21	MF	CHN	Qu Xiaohui (loan to Lijiang Jiayunhao)
56	FW	CHN	Dong Xiang (to (Portugal) Sertanense F.C.)

=== Qingdao Jonoon ===
In:

No.	Pos.	Nation	Player
12	FW	ARG	Pablo Nicolás Caballero (from (Argentina) Almirante Brown)
39	FW	AUS	Joel Griffiths (from (Australia) Sydney FC)

Out:

No.	Pos.	Nation	Player
6	MF	UZB	Sherzod Karimov (loan return to (Uzbekistan) Pakhtakor Tashkent)
10	MF	CHN	Zheng Long (loan to Guangzhou Evergrande)
11	FW	SYR	George Mourad (to (Sweden) Örgryte IS)
21	MF	CHN	Hu Jun (loan to (Hong Kong) Tuen Mun)

=== Shandong Luneng ===
In:

No.	Pos.	Nation	Player
40	FW	BRA	Vágner Love (from (Russia) CSKA Moscow)

Out:

No.	Pos.	Nation	Player
6	MF	CHN	Zhou Haibin (loan to Tianjin Teda)
23	DF	CHN	Zhao Mingjian (loan to Changchun Yatai)
30	FW	ROU	Marius Niculae (to (Ukraine) Hoverla Uzhhorod)
32	MF	CHN	Ma Xingyu (loan to Qingdao Hainiu)
37	DF	CHN	Otkur Hasan (loan to Shijiazhuang Yongchang)
41	FW	CHN	Yang Chen (loan to Shandong Tengding)
43	FW	CHN	Cheng Yuan (loan to (Portugal) S.C. Covilhã)
45	MF	CHN	Cui Wei (loan to (Portugal) GS Loures)
46	DF	CHN	Wu Haoran (loan to (Portugal) GS Loures)
49	MF	CHN	Qi Tianyu (loan to (Portugal) Casa Pia)
50	DF	CHN	Wang Jiong (loan to (Portugal) Casa Pia)
-	MF	CHN	Zhang Yi (to Shenzhen Ruby)
-	GK	CHN	Mu Qianyu (to Liaoning Whowin)

=== Shanghai Shenhua ===
In:

No.	Pos.	Nation	Player
51	MF	CHN	Abdugheni Emeti (from Xinjiang Youth)
52	MF	CHN	Tong Lei (from Hubei Youth)
53	MF	CHN	Xu Junjie (from Hubei Youth)
55	DF	CHN	Sun Gang (from Hubei Youth)
56	MF	CHN	Yang Chen (Free Agent)
-	FW	CHN	Xu Qi (loan return from Jiangxi Liansheng)

Out:

No.	Pos.	Nation	Player
25	MF	CHN	Su Shun (loan to Dali Ruilong)
30	DF	CHN	Tao Jin (to Hunan Billows)
34	GK	CHN	Dong Hang (loan to Dali Ruilong)
-	FW	CHN	Xu Qi (loan to Dali Ruilong)

=== Shanghai Shenxin ===
In:

No.	Pos.	Nation	Player
2	FW	CHN	Mao Jianqing (loan from Beijing Guoan)
12	MF	CHN	Liao Chengjian (Free Agent)
29	DF	CHN	Zhang Yonghai (loan from Beijing Guoan)
55	DF	CHN	Mao Shiming (from Hebei Zhongji)

Out:

No.	Pos.	Nation	Player
5	DF	CHN	Li Haozhen (Released)

=== Shanghai SIPG ===
In:

No.	Pos.	Nation	Player
14	FW	AUS	Bernie Ibini-Isei (from (Australia) Central Coast Mariners)
36	FW	AUS	Daniel McBreen (loan from (Australia) Central Coast Mariners)

Out:

No.	Pos.	Nation	Player
8	FW	GHA	Chris Dickson (to (England) Dagenham & Redbridge)

=== Tianjin Teda ===
In:

No.	Pos.	Nation	Player
38	MF	BRA	Andrezinho (from (Brazil) Botafogo)
39	MF	CHN	Zhou Haibin (loan from Shandong Luneng)
40	FW	BRA	Baré (from (Japan) Shimizu S-Pulse)
-	MF	CHN	Li Yuanyi (loan return from (Portugal) Casa Pia)

Out:

No.	Pos.	Nation	Player
9	FW	BRA	Dinélson (to (Brazil) Ceará)
14	FW	CHN	Fan Zhiqiang (loan to Shenzhen Fengpeng)
23	GK	CHN	Lu Zheyu (loan to Shenzhen Fengpeng)
31	FW	BIH	Vladimir Jovančić (Released)
33	DF	CHN	Cai Xi (loan to Shenzhen Fengpeng)
49	GK	CHN	Wen Zhixiang (to Jiangsu Sainty)
-	MF	CHN	Li Yuanyi (to (Portugal) Boavista)

=== Wuhan Zall ===
In:

No.	Pos.	Nation	Player
31	DF	SEN	Jacques Faty (from (Turkey) Sivasspor)
32	FW	SRB	Miloš Stojanović (from (Serbia) FK Jagodina)
34	MF	CHN	Wang Yang (Free Agent)

Out:

No.	Pos.	Nation	Player
4	DF	SRB	Novak Martinović (to (Serbia) Red Star Belgrade)
10	MF	BRA	Santos Junior (to (South Korea) Suwon Samsung Bluewings)

== League One ==
=== Beijing Baxy ===
In:

No.	Pos.	Nation	Player
39	FW	NGA	Stephen Makinwa (from (Italy) Carrarese Calcio)

Out:

No.	Pos.	Nation	Player
10	FW	SVN	Tomislav Mišura (Released)
29	MF	CHN	Li Jun (to Yanbian Changbai Tiger)

=== Beijing Technology ===
In:

No.	Pos.	Nation	Player
33	DF	CHN	Zhang Jizhou (loan from Beijing Guoan)

Out:

No.	Pos.	Nation	Player

=== Chengdu Blades ===
In:

No.	Pos.	Nation	Player
35	MF	CHN	Peng Xinli (loan from Guangzhou Evergrande)
36	DF	CHN	Gong Liangxuan (from Guangzhou Evergrande)
38	MF	CHN	Li Mou (from Changchun Yatai)
40	FW	GLP	Brice Jovial (loan from (France) Dijon FCO)

Out:

No.	Pos.	Nation	Player
9	FW	BUL	Gerasim Zakov (to (Turkey) Boluspor)

=== Chongqing F.C. ===
In:

No.	Pos.	Nation	Player
10	FW	BRA	Nei (from (Brazil) Grêmio Anápolis)
12	FW	CHN	Shen Tianfeng (loan from Guizhou Renhe)

Out:

No.	Pos.	Nation	Player
22	DF	CRO	Stipe Lapić (Released)

=== Chongqing Lifan ===
In:

No.	Pos.	Nation	Player
32	MF	BOL	Gualberto Mojica (from (Romania) Petrolul Ploiești)

Out:

No.	Pos.	Nation	Player
10	FW	AUS	Brendon Šantalab (to (Australia) Western Sydney Wanderers)
18	DF	CHN	Cui Min (to Yanbian Changbai Tiger)

=== Guangdong Sunray Cave ===
In:

No.	Pos.	Nation	Player
-	GK	CHN	Zhou Yousheng (from Liaoning Youth)

Out:

No.	Pos.	Nation	Player

=== Guizhou Zhicheng ===
In:

No.	Pos.	Nation	Player
26	MF	HKG	Andy Nägelein (from Hong Kong Rangers)
31	FW	HON	Carlo Costly (from (Greece) Veria F.C.)

Out:

No.	Pos.	Nation	Player
7	MF	KOR	Lee Kil-Hoon (to Hong Kong Rangers)

=== Harbin Yiteng ===
In:

No.	Pos.	Nation	Player
4	DF	HKG	Wisdom Fofo Agbo (from (Hong Kong) Southern)
18	MF	CHN	Wei Jiawei (from Hebei Youth)

Out:

No.	Pos.	Nation	Player
3	DF	CHN	Niu Xilong (loan to Lijiang Jiayunhao)
19	FW	CHN	Yang Baoming (to Hebei Zhongji)

=== Henan Jianye ===
In:

No.	Pos.	Nation	Player
36	FW	ANG	Nando Rafael (from (Germany) Fortuna Düsseldorf)
39	DF	CHN	Tang Dechao (from Guangzhou Evergrande)

Out:

No.	Pos.	Nation	Player
9	FW	COD	Joël Tshibamba (to (Denmark) FC Vestsjælland)
31	DF	CHN	Luo Heng (loan to Jiangxi Liansheng)

=== Hubei China-Kyle ===
In:

No.	Pos.	Nation	Player
28	MF	CHN	Chen Shuo (from Hubei Youth)
29	FW	HON	Mitchel Brown (from (Honduras) Marathón)
30	DF	CHN	Yan Zhiyu (from Hubei Youth)

Out:

No.	Pos.	Nation	Player
10	FW	CHN	Hou Zhe (loan to Shenzhen Fengpeng)
24	DF	HON	Quiarol Arzú (Released)

=== Hunan Billows ===
In:

No.	Pos.	Nation	Player
21	DF	CHN	Cao Guodong (from Hubei Youth)
29	MF	HON	Emil Martínez (from (Honduras) Marathón)
31	MF	CHN	Zhong Haoran (from Hubei Youth)
32	DF	CHN	Tao Jin (from Shanghai Shenhua)
33	FW	CHN	Du Wenhui (Free Agent)
35	DF	CHN	Zhong Zhenlong (from Hubei Youth)

Out:

No.	Pos.	Nation	Player
5	DF	EST	Taavi Rähn (to (Finland) FF Jaro)

=== Shenyang Shenbei ===
In:

No.	Pos.	Nation	Player

Out:

No.	Pos.	Nation	Player

=== Shenzhen Ruby ===
In:

No.	Pos.	Nation	Player
22	MF	CHN	Tan Binliang (from (Sweden) Jönköpings Södra IF)
35	MF	TPE	Víctor Chou (from (Hong Kong) South China)
42	MF	CHN	Zhang Yi (from Shandong Luneng)

Out:

No.	Pos.	Nation	Player

=== Shijiazhuang Yongchang ===
In:

No.	Pos.	Nation	Player
20	DF	CHN	Otkur Hasan (loan from Shandong Luneng)
33	MF	CHN	Guo Sheng (loan from Guizhou Renhe)

Out:

No.	Pos.	Nation	Player
27	DF	CHN	Chang Lin (loan to Meizhou Kejia)

=== Tianjin Songjiang ===
In:

No.	Pos.	Nation	Player
7	MF	BRA	Mário Lúcio (from (Brazil) Sobradinho)

Out:

No.	Pos.	Nation	Player
1	GK	CHN	Sui Weijie (loan to Hebei Zhongji)
10	FW	BRA	Vaguinho (Released)

=== Yanbian Changbai Tiger ===
In:

No.	Pos.	Nation	Player
38	DF	CHN	Cui Min (from Chongqing Lifan)
39	MF	CHN	Li Jun (from Beijing Baxy)

Out:

No.	Pos.	Nation	Player
4	MF	CHN	Li Minhui (loan to Qingdao Hainiu)
