= Li Hong (disambiguation) =

Li Hong (652–675) was a crown prince the Chinese Tang Dynasty. Li Hong may also refer to:

- Li Ying (prince), his grandnephew, the crown prince of Emperor Xuanzong of Tang and also known as Li Hong
- Li Hong (Taoist eschatology), Taoist messianic figure
- Li Hong (field hockey), Chinese field hockey player
- Li Hong (racewalker) (born 1979), Chinese racewalking athlete and winner at the 2000 Asian Athletics Championships
- Li Hong (footballer), Chinese footballer
- Zhang Jianhong, Chinese writer using pen name Li Hong
