= Pan Ximing =

Chinese footballer

Pan Ximing 潘喜明
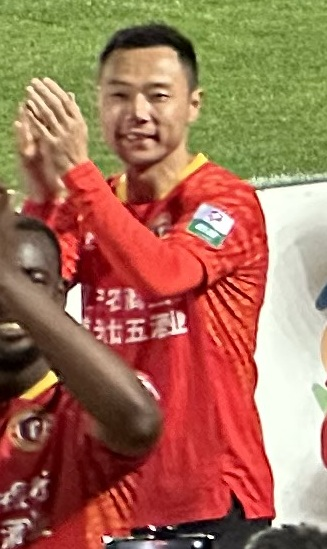
- Pan Ximing in April 2025

Personal information
- Full name: Pan Ximing
- Date of birth: 11 January 1993 (age 33)
- Place of birth: Benxi, Liaoning, China
- Height: 1.82 m (5 ft 11 1/2 in)
- Position: Defender

Team information
- Current team: Liaoning Tieren
- Number: 3

Youth career
- Changchun Yatai

Senior career*
Years	Team	Apps	(Gls)
2011–2013	Shaanxi Laochenggen	28	(0)
2014–2015	Gondomar	19	(2)
2015–2016	Leixões	6	(0)
2016–2017	Tianjin Teda	32	(1)
2018	Tianjin Quanjian	0	(0)
2019–2022	Hebei FC	58	(0)
2023–2024	Meizhou Hakka	34	(1)
2025–	Liaoning Tieren	45	(0)
- * Club domestic league appearances and goals as of 22 November 2026

Pan Ximing (Chinese: 潘喜明; pinyin: Pān Xǐmíng; born 11 January 1993 in Shenyang) is a Chinese footballer who currently plays for China League One side Liaoning Tieren.

== Club career ==
Pan Ximing started his football career when he joined Changchun Yatai's youth academy. He was loaned to China League Two side Shaanxi Laochenggen from 2011 to 2013. He moved to Portuguese Second Division side Gondomar in August 2014. Pan transferred to Segunda Liga side Leixões along with Guo Yi on 6 July 2015.

Pan returned to China and joined Chinese Super League side Tianjin Teda on 29 January 2016. He made his debut for Tianjin in the 2016 Chinese FA Cup on 11 May 2016, in a 7–1 away victory against Guangdong Haoxin. On 14 June 2016, he made his Super league debut in a 2–0 loss against Guangzhou Evergrande, coming on as a substitute for Fan Baiqun in the 59th minute. On 9 September 2017, he scored his first goal for the club in a 3–1 away loss against Shanghai SIPG. At the end of the 2017 season, Pan went on to make 20 appearances and scoring once in all competitions. However, he terminated his contract with the club at the end of 2017.

In January 2018, Pan signed a four-year contract with Tianjin Teda's city rival Tianjin Quanjian.

== Career statistics ==
As of 22 November 2026.

Appearances and goals by club, season and competition
Club	Season	League			National Cup		League Cup		Continental		Total	
Club	Season	Division	Apps	Goals	Apps	Goals	Apps	Goals	Apps	Goals	Apps	Goals
Shaanxi Laochenggen	2011	China League Two	2	0	-		-		-		2	0
Shaanxi Laochenggen	2012	China League Two	19	0	1	0	-		-		20	0
Shaanxi Laochenggen	2013	China League Two	7	0	2	0	-		-		9	0
Shaanxi Laochenggen	Total		28	0	3	0	0	0	0	0	31	0
Gondomar	2014–15	Campeonato de Portugal	19	2	1	0	-		-		20	2
Leixões	2015–16	Segunda Liga	6	0	0	0	1	0	-		7	0
Tianjin Teda	2016	Chinese Super League	13	0	2	0	-		-		15	0
Tianjin Teda	2017	Chinese Super League	19	1	1	0	-		-		20	1
Tianjin Teda	Total		32	1	3	0	0	0	0	0	35	1
Tianjin Quanjian	2018	Chinese Super League	0	0	0	0	-		0	0	0	0
Hebei China Fortune/ Hebei FC	2019	Chinese Super League	11	0	0	0	-		-		11	0
Hebei China Fortune/ Hebei FC	2020	Chinese Super League	18	0	1	0	-		-		19	0
Hebei China Fortune/ Hebei FC	2021	Chinese Super League	4	0	0	0	-		-		4	0
Hebei China Fortune/ Hebei FC	2022	Chinese Super League	25	0	0	0	-		-		25	0
Hebei China Fortune/ Hebei FC	Total		58	0	1	0	0	0	0	0	59	0
Meizhou Hakka	2023	Chinese Super League	20	1	0	0	-		-		20	1
Meizhou Hakka	2024	Chinese Super League	14	0	1	0	-		-		15	0
Meizhou Hakka	Total		34	1	1	0	0	0	0	0	35	0
Liaoning Tieren	2025	China League One	24	1	2	0	-		-		26	1
Liaoning Tieren	2026	Chinese Super League	21	0	1	0	-		-		22	0
Liaoning Tieren	Total		45	0	2	0	0	0	0	0	47	0
Career total			222	4	11	0	1	0	0	0	244	4

== Honours ==
Liaoning Tieren

- China League One: 2025
