= Yi Fan =

Yi Fan may refer to:

- Nancy Yi Fan (born 1993), writer
- Hou Yifan (born 1994), chess player
- Yi Fan (footballer) (born 1992), Chinese football player
