= Yang Lei (footballer) =

Chinese footballer

Yang Lei 杨磊
Personal information
- Date of birth: January 9, 1993 (age 33)
- Place of birth: Lijiang, Yunnan, China
- Height: 1.80 m (5 ft 11 in)
- Position: Midfielder

Team information
- Current team: Sichuan Jiuniu

Youth career
- Guizhou Renhe

Senior career*
Years	Team	Apps	(Gls)
2011	→ Shaanxi Laochenggen (loan)	12	(0)
2012–2016	Guizhou Renhe	0	(0)
2013	→ Shaanxi Laochenggen (loan)	10	(1)
2014–2015	→ Lijiang Jiayunhao (loan)	21	(2)
2016	→ Heilongjiang Lava Spring (loan)	16	(1)
2017–2022	Heilongjiang Lava Spring	98	(9)
2022-	Sichuan Jiuniu	0	(0)
- * Club domestic league appearances and goals as of 26 April 2022

Yang Lei (Chinese: 杨磊; pinyin: Yáng Lěi) (born 9 January 1993) is a Chinese footballer who currently plays for Sichuan Jiuniu in the China League One.

== Club career ==
Yang started his football career in 2011 when he was loan to China League Two club Xi'an Laochenggen for one year. He made 12 appearances in the 2011 league season. He was promoted to Guizhou Renhe's first team squad by Gao Hongbo in 2012. On 4 July 2012, he made his debut for Guizhou Renhe in the third round of 2012 Chinese FA Cup which Guizhou beat Guangdong Sunray Cave 2–0 at home. He was loaned to Shaanxi Laochenggen again for one year in March 2013.

In March 2016, Yang was loaned to China League Two side Heilongjiang Lava Spring, He made a permanent transfer to Heilongjiang in March 2017.

== Career statistics ==
Statistics accurate as of match played 31 December 2020.

Appearances and goals by club, season and competition
Club	Season	League			National Cup		Continental		Other		Total	
Club	Season	Division	Apps	Goals	Apps	Goals	Apps	Goals	Apps	Goals	Apps	Goals
Shaanxi Laochenggen (loan)	2011	China League Two	12	0	-		-		-		12	0
Guizhou Renhe	2012	Chinese Super League	0	0	2	0	-		-		2	0
Shaanxi Laochenggen (loan)	2013	China League Two	10	1	2	1	-		-		12	2
Lijiang Jiayunhao (loan)	2014	China League Two	11	2	0	0	-		-		11	2
Lijiang Jiayunhao (loan)	2015	China League Two	10	0	0	0	-		-		10	0
Lijiang Jiayunhao (loan)	Total		21	2	0	0	0	0	0	0	21	2
Heilongjiang Lava Spring (loan)	2016	China League Two	16	1	2	0	-		-		18	1
Heilongjiang Lava Spring	2017	China League Two	25	4	2	0	-		-		27	4
Heilongjiang Lava Spring	2018	China League One	13	0	0	0	-		-		13	0
Heilongjiang Lava Spring	2019	China League One	27	2	1	0	-		-		28	2
Heilongjiang Lava Spring	2020	China League One	15	0	-		-		2 (Note: Appearances in China League One relegation play-offs)	0	17	0
Heilongjiang Lava Spring	Total		80	6	3	0	0	0	2	0	85	6
Career total			139	10	9	1	0	0	2	0	150	11

== Honours ==
=== Club ===
Heilongjiang Lava Spring

- China League Two: 2017
