= Aegean Sea (website) =

Chinese defunct website

- Website type: Humanistic thought website
- Founded: May 20, 2001
- Dissolved: March 9, 2006
- Founder: Zhang Jianhong
- Website: www.aiqinhai.org www.77sea.com

The Aegean Sea website, commonly known as Aiqinhai and based in Hangzhou, China, was an ideological and humanistic website that preached freedom and democracy. The website was founded on May 20, 2001 by Zhang Jianhong, who also served as its editor-in-chief, and with poet Bei Dao as general advisor, and was closed on March 9, 2006.

Aegean Sea boasted itself as "The Last Clean Paradise of Chinese Literatures".

== Shutdown ==
On March 9, 2006, Aegean Sea was shut down by the Zhejiang authorities for allegedly publishing news in violation of Internet regulations.
