= Zhao Yingjie =

Chinese footballer

Zhao Yingjie 赵英杰
Personal information
- Date of birth: 2 August 1992 (age 34)
- Place of birth: Tianjin, China
- Height: 1.83 m (6 ft 0 in)
- Position: Midfielder

Team information
- Current team: Shenzhen Juniors

Senior career*
Years	Team	Apps	(Gls)
2011–2023	Tianjin Jinmen Tiger	87	(4)
2013	→ Tianjin Songjiang (loan)	18	(2)
2014	→ Lijiang Jiayunhao (loan)	10	(0)
2024	Cangzhou Mighty Lions	26	(1)
2025	Changchun Yatai	22	(0)
2026–	Shenzhen Juniors	0	(0)
- * Club domestic league appearances and goals as of 28 August 2025

Zhao Yingjie (Chinese: 赵英杰; born 2 August 1992) is a Chinese professional footballer who currently plays for as a midfielder for Chinese Super League club Shenzhen Juniors.

== Club career ==
=== Tianjin Teda ===
Zhao started his professional career with Chinese Super League side Tianjin Teda (later renamed as Tianjin Jinmen Tiger) in the 2011 league season when he was included their senior team squad. He would not make any first team appearances for the club and was sent to the reserve team throughout the 2012 campaign, however by 2013 Zhao was loaned to China League One side Tianjin Songjiang to gain some playing time. In 2014, Zhao was loaned out once more, this time to China League Two side Lijiang Jiayunhao. Upon his return Zhao would be placed in the reserve team throughout the 2015 campaign and would not make his debut for the club until 22 October 2016, when he came on as a substitute for Fredy Montero in the 72nd minute against Hebei China Fortune in a 2016 Chinese Super League game that ended in a 5-0 defeat.

On 2 May 2017, Zhao scored his first goal for the club in the third round of the 2017 Chinese FA Cup, converting in a penalty in a 2-0 away win against Shanghai Jiading Boo King. On 7 November 2018, he scored his first Chinese Super League goal in a 3-1 comeback home win against Dalian Yifang, which esstentially secured Teda's status in the top flight. On 18 August 2023, he made his 100th appearance for Tianjin in a 1-0 away defeat at Shandong Taishan.

=== Cangzhou Mighty Lions ===
On 29 February 2024, Zhao joined fellow Chinese Super League club Cangzhou Mighty Lions. On 14 April 2024, he scored his first goal for Cangzhou in a 3-2 comeback home win against Qingdao West Coast.

=== Changchun Yatai ===
On 28 January 2025, Zhao joined fellow Chinese Super League club Changchun Yatai on a free transfer.

=== Shenzhen Juniors ===
On 21 January 2026, Zhao joined fellow China League One club Shenzhen Juniors.

== Career statistics ==
Statistics accurate as of match played 2 November 2024.

Appearances and goals by club, season and competition
Club	Season	League			National Cup		Continental		Other		Total	
Club	Season	Division	Apps	Goals	Apps	Goals	Apps	Goals	Apps	Goals	Apps	Goals
Tianjin Teda/ Tianjin Jinmen Tiger	2011	Chinese Super League	0	0	0	0	-		0	0	0	0
Tianjin Teda/ Tianjin Jinmen Tiger	2012	Chinese Super League	0	0	0	0	-		0	0	0	0
Tianjin Teda/ Tianjin Jinmen Tiger	2015	Chinese Super League	0	0	0	0	-		-		0	0
Tianjin Teda/ Tianjin Jinmen Tiger	2016	Chinese Super League	2	0	0	0	-		-		2	0
Tianjin Teda/ Tianjin Jinmen Tiger	2017	Chinese Super League	8	0	2	1	-		-		10	1
Tianjin Teda/ Tianjin Jinmen Tiger	2018	Chinese Super League	16	1	2	0	-		-		18	1
Tianjin Teda/ Tianjin Jinmen Tiger	2019	Chinese Super League	7	0	2	0	-		-		9	0
Tianjin Teda/ Tianjin Jinmen Tiger	2020	Chinese Super League	7	0	3	0	-		-		10	0
Tianjin Teda/ Tianjin Jinmen Tiger	2021	Chinese Super League	18	1	2	0	-		-		20	1
Tianjin Teda/ Tianjin Jinmen Tiger	2022	Chinese Super League	21	2	1	1	-		-		22	3
Tianjin Teda/ Tianjin Jinmen Tiger	2023	Chinese Super League	8	0	2	0	-		-		10	0
Tianjin Teda/ Tianjin Jinmen Tiger	Total		87	4	14	2	0	0	0	0	101	6
Tianjin Songjiang (loan)	2013	China League One	18	2	2	0	-		-		20	2
Lijiang Jiayunhao (loan)	2014	China League Two	10	0	0	0	-		-		10	0
Cangzhou Mighty Lions	2024	Chinese Super League	26	1	0	0	-		-		26	1
Career total			141	7	16	2	0	0	0	0	157	9
