= Wang Erzhuo =

Chinese footballer (born 1987)

Wang Erzhuo 王尔卓
Personal information
- Date of birth: 5 February 1987 (age 39)
- Place of birth: Xi'an, Shaanxi, China
- Height: 1.72 m (5 ft 8 in)
- Position: Left winger

Youth career
- 2000–2005: Shaanxi National Power

Senior career*
Years	Team	Apps	(Gls)
2006–2014	Guizhou Renhe	57	(6)
2010	→ Shenzhen Ruby (loan)	7	(0)
2012	→ Shaanxi Laochenggen (loan)	13	(5)
2013	→ Chengdu Blades (loan)	19	(2)
2014	→ Sichuan Longfor (loan)	16	(3)
2015	Beijing BIT	28	(2)
2016	Tianjin Locomotive	20	(6)
2017–2021	Shaanxi Chang'an Athletic	62	(4)

Managerial career
- 2022-2023: Shaanxi Chang'an Athletic youth
- * Club domestic league appearances and goals as of 31 December 2020

Wang Erzhuo (simplified Chinese: 王尔卓; traditional Chinese: 王爾卓; pinyin: Wáng Ěrzhuō; born February 5, 1987, in Xi'an, Shaanxi) is a Chinese former footballer.

== Club career ==
Wang Erzhuo began his football career playing for his hometown football club Shaanxi National Power in their youth team until the end of 2005 league season when the club went bankrupt and disbanded. Free to leave Wang Erzhuo would go out and have a trial for top tier side Xi'an Chanba International who recently moved their club into the Shaanxi province and impressed the club enough to achieve a professional contract with them, this move would also make him the only player from Shaanxi to actually play for the club. He would be drafted into the senior side during the 2006 league season and was given his league debut on August 8, 2007, against Wuhan Optics Valley F.C. where he came on as a substitute in a 2–0 victory. Under the club's manager Cheng Yaodong Wang would gradually start to establish himself within the team and go on to score his first league goal on September 29, 2006, against Tianjin Teda F.C. in a 4–2 victory. The following seasons saw Wang further establish himself within the midfield until he became a vital member within the club by the 2009 league season, however this was to prove to be a disappointing season for the club that saw them flirt with relegation and finish in a disappointing twelfth. Cheng Yaodong would also leave the club near the end of the season and Zhu Guanghu was brought in and would decide to drop Wang. At the beginning of the 2010 league season Wang was still kept on, however unable to break back into the first team he was instead loaned out to Shenzhen Ruby.

Before the 2012 season, Shaanxi decided to move to Guizhou and they changed their club name to Guizhou Renhe. Along with Zhang Chengxiang and Liao Linkun, Wang was loaned to China League Two club Shaanxi Laochenggen for the rest of the season in mid-July. He scored 5 goals in the Group Stage as Shaanxi Laochenggen finished 4th place in the North Group and entered the play-offs stage. However, Shaanxi lost to Guizhou Zhicheng 2–0 on aggregate in the quarter-finals and failed to promote to China League One. Wang was released by Guizhou Rehne in January 2013. He was signed by China League One side Chengdu Blades in February 2013. In February 2014, Wang was loaned to Sichuan Longfor until the end of 2014 season. In March 2015, Wang transferred to China League One club Beijing BIT. In March 2016, Wang transferred to China League Two club Tianjin Locomotive.

On 17 December 2016, Wang was signed by his hometown club Shaanxi Chang'an Athletic in the China League Two.

== Career statistics ==
Statistics accurate as of match played 31 December 2020.

Appearances and goals by club, season and competition
Club	Season	League			National Cup		Continental		Other		Total	
Club	Season	Division	Apps	Goals	Apps	Goals	Apps	Goals	Apps	Goals	Apps	Goals
Xi'an Chanba/ Guizhou Renhe	2006	Chinese Super League	0	0	0	0	-		-		0	0
Xi'an Chanba/ Guizhou Renhe	2007	Chinese Super League	9	1	-		-		-		9	1
Xi'an Chanba/ Guizhou Renhe	2008	Chinese Super League	16	2	-		-		-		16	2
Xi'an Chanba/ Guizhou Renhe	2009	Chinese Super League	25	3	-		-		-		25	3
Xi'an Chanba/ Guizhou Renhe	2010	Chinese Super League	2	0	-		-		-		2	0
Xi'an Chanba/ Guizhou Renhe	2011	Chinese Super League	5	0	-		-		-		5	0
Xi'an Chanba/ Guizhou Renhe	Total		57	6	0	0	0	0	0	0	57	6
Shenzhen Ruby (loan)	2010	Chinese Super League	7	1	-		-		-		7	1
Shaanxi Laochenggen (loan)	2012	China League Two	13	5	0	0	-		-		13	5
Chengdu Blades (loan)	2013	China League One	19	2	1	0	-		-		20	2
Sichuan Longfor (loan)	2014	China League Two	16	3	-		-		-		16	3
Beijing BIT	2015	China League One	28	2	1	0	-		-		29	2
Tianjin Locomotive	2016	China League Two	20	6	1	0	-		-		21	6
Shaanxi Chang'an Athletic	2017	China League Two	22	2	1	0	-		-		23	2
Shaanxi Chang'an Athletic	2018	China League Two	19	2	2	0	-		-		21	2
Shaanxi Chang'an Athletic	2019	China League One	18	0	2	0	-		-		20	0
Shaanxi Chang'an Athletic	2020	China League One	3	0	-		-		-		3	0
Shaanxi Chang'an Athletic	Total		62	4	5	0	0	0	0	0	67	4
Career total			222	29	8	0	0	0	0	0	230	29
