= Zhang Chengxiang =

Chinese footballer

Zhang Chengxiang 张成祥
Personal information
- Date of birth: 25 January 1989 (age 37)
- Place of birth: Guzhen, Anhui, China
- Height: 1.86 m (6 ft 1 in)
- Position: Forward

Senior career*
Years	Team	Apps	(Gls)
2007–2010	Changsha Ginde	26	(1)
2011–2014	Guizhou Renhe	0	(0)
2012–2013	→ Shaanxi Laochenggen (loan)	25	(7)
2015	Tianjin Locomotive	14	(4)
2016–2017	Heilongjiang Lava Spring	22	(3)
- * Club domestic league appearances and goals as of 5 November 2017

Zhang Chengxiang (simplified Chinese: 张成祥; traditional Chinese: 張成祥; pinyin: Zhāng Chéngxiáng; born 25 January 1989) is a Chinese footballer currently playing for China League Two side Heilongjiang Lava Spring as a forward.

== Club career ==
Zhang joined Changsha Ginde youth team system in the early year and was promoted to first team squad in 2007. On 7 April 2007, he made his Super League debut in a 4–2 away defeat against Shandong Luneng Taishan, coming on as a substitute for Li Zhenhong in the 80th minute. Playing as a substitute striker, Zhang made just 26 appearances for Changsha Ginde between 2007 and 2010. His first senior goal came on 14 August 2010, in a 3–2 away defeat against Tianjin Teda.

After Changsha Ginde relegated to second-tier league in the end of 2010 season, Zhang transferred to Super League club Shaanxi Chanba in December 2010 with his elder brother Zhang Chenglin. However, he failed to establish himself within the first team and played mostly in the reserve team league. He followed the club to move to Guizhou in 2012. On 4 July 2012, he made his debut for Guizhou Renhe in the third round of 2012 Chinese FA Cup which Guizhou beat Guangdong Sunray Cave 2–0 at Guiyang Olympic Centre. Along with Wang Erzhuo and Liao Linkun, Zhang was loaned to China League Two club Shaanxi Laochenggen for the rest of the season in mid-July. He scored 5 goals in the Group Stage as Shaanxi Laochenggen finished 4th place in the North Group and entered the play-offs stage. However, Shaanxi lost to Guizhou Zhicheng 2–0 on aggregate in the quarter-finals and failed to promote to China League One. In March 2013, Shaanxi Laochenggen extended Zhang's loan deal for one year.

In March 2015, Zhang transferred to China League Two side Tianjin Locomotive. He moved to fellow China League Two side Heilongjiang Lava Spring in March 2016.

== Personal life ==
Zhang Chengxiang's elder brother, Zhang Chenglin, is also a professional footballer. They played together at Changsha Ginde (2007–2010) and Guizhou Renhe (2011–2014).

== Career statistics ==
Statistics accurate as of match played 5 November 2017.

Club performance			League		Cup		League Cup		Continental		Total	
Season	Club	League	Apps	Goals	Apps	Goals	Apps	Goals	Apps	Goals	Apps	Goals
China PR			League		FA Cup		CSL Cup		Asia		Total	
2007	Changsha Ginde	Chinese Super League	2	0	-		-		-		2	0
2008	Changsha Ginde	Chinese Super League	11	0	-		-		-		11	0
2009	Changsha Ginde	Chinese Super League	9	0	-		-		-		9	0
2010	Changsha Ginde	Chinese Super League	4	1	-		-		-		4	1
2011	Guizhou Renhe	Chinese Super League	0	0	0	0	-		-		0	0
2012	Guizhou Renhe	Chinese Super League	0	0	1	0	-		-		1	0
2012	Shaanxi Laochenggen	China League Two	14	5	-		-		-		14	5
2013	Shaanxi Laochenggen	China League Two	11	2	1	0	-		-		12	2
2014	Guizhou Renhe	Chinese Super League	0	0	0	0	-		0	0	0	0
2015	Tianjin Locomotive	China League Two	14	4	2	1	-		-		16	5
2016	Heilongjiang Lava Spring	China League Two	17	3	2	0	-		-		19	3
2017	Heilongjiang Lava Spring	China League Two	5	0	2	1	-		-		7	1
Total	China PR		87	15	8	2	0	0	0	0	95	17
