= Lijiang Sports Development Centre Stadium =

Sports venue in Lijiang, Yunnan, China

Lijiang Stadium
- Location: Lijiang, China
- Capacity: 22,400

The Lijiang Sports Development Centre Stadium (Chinese: 丽江体育发展中心体育场), or simply Lijiang Stadium, is a sports venue in Lijiang, Yunnan, PR China. It has a capacity of 22,400 and it is used mostly for association football matches. It is also used for athletics.
