= Li Hong (footballer) =

Chinese footballer (born 1993)

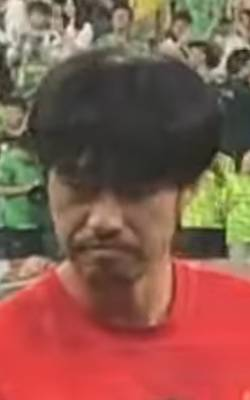
- Li Hong in June 2023

Personal information
- Date of birth: 16 January 1993 (age 33)
- Place of birth: Yantai, Shandong, China
- Height: 1.84 m (6 ft 0 in)
- Positions: Left-back; centre-back

Youth career
- –2013: Changchun Yatai

Senior career*
Years	Team	Apps	(Gls)
2013–2017	Changchun Yatai	0	(0)
2013	→ Shaanxi Laochenggen (loan)		
2018–2019	Zhejiang Yiteng	41	(1)
2020	Yunnan Kunlu	9	(0)
2021–2022	Shaanxi Chang'an Athletic	38	(0)
2022	Cangzhou Mighty Lions	11	(0)
2023	Changchun Yatai	12	(0)
2024	Cangzhou Mighty Lions	7	(0)
- * Club domestic league appearances and goals as of 14:01, 31 January 2023 (UTC)

Li Hong (Chinese: 历鸿; born 16 January 1993) is a Chinese former footballer who played as a left-back or centre-back.

On 10 September 2024, Chinese Football Association announced that Li was banned from football-related activities for five years, from 10 September 2024 to 9 September 2029, for involving in match-fixing.

== Club career ==
Li Hong would play for the Changchun Yatai youth team before being promoted to their senior team and then loaned to third tier club Shaanxi Laochenggen in the 2013 China League Two season. On his return to Changchun he would be moved to their reserve squad until he transferred to second tier football club Zhejiang Yiteng on 26 February 2018. He would gradually establish himself as a regular within the team and aided his club to a twelfth place finish, however despite this the club were relegated after the club failed to apply for a League One license.

Li Hong joined another third tier club Yunnan Kunlu in the 2020 China League Two season before joining second tier club Shaanxi Chang'an Athletic on 15 April 2021. He would make his debut in a league game on 5 May 2021 in a 4-1 victory against Xinjiang Tianshan Leopard F.C. After going on to establish himself as an integral member of the team he would join top tier club Cangzhou Mighty Lions on 9 August 2022. He would make his debut in a league game on 24 August 2022 in a 1-1 draw against Zhejiang Professional.

On 30 March 2023, Li would join fellow top tier club Changchun Yatai for the start of the 2023 Chinese Super League season.

== Career statistics ==
As of 31 January 2023.

Club	Season	League			Cup		Continental		Other		Total	
Club	Season	Division	Apps	Goals	Apps	Goals	Apps	Goals	Apps	Goals	Apps	Goals
Changchun Yatai	2013	Chinese Super League	0	0	0	0	–		–		0	0
Changchun Yatai	2014	Chinese Super League	0	0	0	0	–		–		0	0
Changchun Yatai	2015	Chinese Super League	0	0	0	0	–		–		0	0
Changchun Yatai	2016	Chinese Super League	0	0	0	0	–		–		0	0
Changchun Yatai	2017	Chinese Super League	0	0	0	0	–		–		0	0
Changchun Yatai	Total		0	0	0	0	0	0	0	0	0	0
Shaanxi Laochenggen (loan)	2013	China League Two	?	?	2	0	–		–		2	0
Zhejiang Yiteng	2018	China League One	14	0	1	0	–		–		15	0
Zhejiang Yiteng	2019	China League Two	29	1	2	0	–		–		31	1
Zhejiang Yiteng	Total		43	1	3	0	0	0	0	0	46	1
Kunming Zheng He Shipman	2020	China League Two	9	0	0	0	–		–		9	0
Shaanxi Chang'an Athletic	2021	China League One	29	0	2	0	–		–		31	0
Shaanxi Chang'an Athletic	2022	China League One	9	0	0	0	–		–		9	0
Shaanxi Chang'an Athletic	Total		38	0	2	0	0	0	0	0	40	0
Cangzhou Mighty Lions	2022	Chinese Super League	11	0	2	0	–		–		13	0
Changchun Yatai	2023	Chinese Super League	0	0	0	0	–		–		0	0
Career total			101	1	9	0	0	0	0	0	110	1
