= Wang Jinliang =

Chinese footballer

Wang Jinliang 王金良
Personal information
- Date of birth: 28 August 1993 (age 33)
- Place of birth: Xifeng, Liaoning, China
- Height: 1.76 m (5 ft 9 in)
- Position: Midfielder

Team information
- Current team: Jiangsu Yancheng Dingli
- Number: 23

Youth career
- Changchun Yatai

Senior career*
Years	Team	Apps	(Gls)
2011–2013	Shaanxi Laochenggen	26	(0)
2013–2015	Mafra	9	(0)
2014	→ Vila F. Rosário (loan)	2	(0)
2016–	Changchun Yatai	2	(0)
2018	→ Sichuan Jiuniu (loan)	15	(0)
2019	→ Jiangsu Yancheng Dingli (loan)	18	(0)
- * Club domestic league appearances and goals as of 12 October 2019

Wang Jinliang (Chinese: 王金良; pinyin: Wáng Jīnliáng; born 28 August 1993) is a Chinese professional footballer who plays as a midfielder for China League Two side Jiangsu Yancheng Dingli on loan from Changchun Yatai.

== Career ==
Wang Jinliang started his football career when he joined Chinese Super League side Changchun Yatai's youth academy. He was loaned to China League Two side Shaanxi Laochenggen from 2011 to 2013. Wang moved to Campeonato de Portugal side Mafra in September 2013. He was loaned to Vila F. Rosário for half season in January 2014. Wang made his debut for Mafra on 31 August 2014 in a 3–1 home victory against Leiria, coming on as a substitute for Luís Carlos in the 84th minute. He made nine appearances in the 2014–15 league season as Mafra won the titles of the league and promoted to the LigaPro. Wang was training with Cova da Piedade in the 2015–16 season but didn't register in the club.

Wang returned to Changchun Yatai in the summer of 2016. On 24 July 2016, he made his Super League debut in a 2–1 away defeat against Hebei China Fortune, coming on for Du Zhenyu in the second half. Wang was relegated to reserve team in the 2018 season. On 23 June 2018, he was loaned to China League Two side Sichuan Jiuniu for the rest of the season. He made his debut on the same day in a 1–1 away draw against Zhenjiang Huasa, coming on for Cao Yiyao in the 58th minute.

On 2 March 2019, Wang was loaned to League Two side Jiangsu Yancheng Dingli for the 2019 season.

== Career statistics ==
As of 12 October 2019

Club performance			League		Cup		League Cup		Continental		Total	
Season	Club	League	Apps	Goals	Apps	Goals	Apps	Goals	Apps	Goals	Apps	Goals
China PR			League		FA Cup		CSL Cup		Asia		Total	
2011	Shaanxi Laochenggen	China League Two	9	0	-		-		-		9	0
2012	Shaanxi Laochenggen	China League Two	15	0	1	0	-		-		16	0
2013	Shaanxi Laochenggen	China League Two	2	0	1	0	-		-		3	0
Portugal			League		Taça de Portugal		Taça da Liga		Europe		Total	
2013–14	Mafra	Campeonato de Portugal	0	0	0	0	-		-		0	0
2013–14	Vila F. Rosário	Lisbon FA Pró-National Division	2	0	-		-		-		2	0
2014–15	Mafra	Campeonato de Portugal	9	0	1	0	-		-		10	0
China PR			League		FA Cup		CSL Cup		Asia		Total	
2016	Changchun Yatai	Chinese Super League	2	0	0	0	-		-		2	0
2017	Changchun Yatai	Chinese Super League	0	0	1	0	-		-		1	0
2018	Sichuan Jiuniu	China League Two	15	0	2	0	-		-		17	0
2019	Jiangsu Yancheng Dingli	China League Two	18	0	1	0	-		-		19	0
Total	China PR		61	0	6	0	0	0	0	0	67	0
Total	Portugal		11	0	1	0	0	0	0	0	12	0
Career total			72	0	7	0	0	0	0	0	79	0

== Honours ==
Mafra

- Campeonato de Portugal: 2014–15
