= Yang Chen (footballer, born 1991) =

Chinese footballer

Yang Chen 杨晨
Personal information
- Date of birth: 1 November 1991 (age 34)
- Place of birth: Nanjing, Jiangsu, China
- Height: 1.75 m (5 ft 9 in)
- Position: Midfielder

Team information
- Current team: Meixian Techand
- Number: 36

Youth career
- Shandong Luneng

Senior career*
Years	Team	Apps	(Gls)
2011–2013	Shandong Luneng	1	(0)
2013–2014	Shandong Tengding	20	(1)
2015–2016	Hainan Seamen	0	(0)
2016–2019	Meixian Hakka	61	(7)
- * Club domestic league appearances and goals as of 3 November 2018

Yang Chen (simplified Chinese: 杨晨; traditional Chinese: 楊晨; pinyin: Yáng Chén; born 1 November 1991) is a Chinese football player who currently plays for China League One side Guangdong South China Tiger.

== Club career ==
Yang Chen started his professional football career in 2011 when he was promoted to Shandong Luneng's first squad. On 16 June 2016, he made his debut for Shandong Luneng in the 2012 Chinese Super League against Liaoning Whowin, coming on as a substitute for Wang Gang in the 85th minute. He scored his first goal for the club on 27 June 2012 in a 4-0 win against Dongguan Nancheng in the 2012 Chinese FA Cup. He returned to Shandong Tengding in July 2013. In 2015, Yang signed for Hainan Seamen.

In June 2016, Yang transferred to China League Two side Meixian Hakka.

== Career statistics ==
Statistics accurate as of match played 3 November 2018.

Club performance			League		Cup		League Cup		Continental		Other		Total	
Season	Club	League	Apps	Goals	Apps	Goals	Apps	Goals	Apps	Goals	Apps	Goals	Apps	Goals
2011	Shandong Luneng	Chinese Super League	0	0	0	0	-		0	0	-		0	0
2012	Shandong Luneng	Chinese Super League	1	0	1	1	-		-		-		2	1
2013	Shandong Tengding	China League Two	11	0	-		-		-		-		11	0
2014	Shandong Tengding	China League Two	9	1	0	0	-		-		-		9	1
2015	Hainan Seamen	CAL	-		-		-		-		-		-	
2016	Hainan Seamen	China League Two	0	0	1	0	-		-		-		1	0
2016	Meixian Techand	China League Two	9	1	0	0	-		-		-		9	1
2017	Meixian Techand	China League Two	25	3	3	1	-		-		-		28	4
2018	Meixian Techand	China League One	27	3	0	0	-		-		2 (Note: Appearances in China League One play-offs)	0	29	3
Total			82	8	5	2	0	0	0	0	2	0	89	10
