= Wu Yizhen =

Chinese footballer

Wu Yizhen 吴毅臻
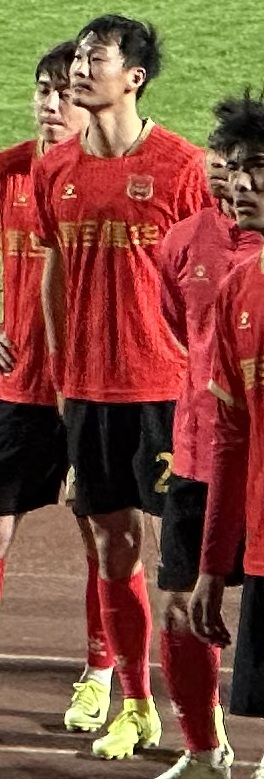
- Wu Yizhen in May 2025

Personal information
- Date of birth: 26 May 1994 (age 32)
- Place of birth: Shanghai, China
- Height: 1.82 m (5 ft 11 1/2 in)
- Position: Left winger

Youth career
- 2006–2010: Shanghai Shenhua

Senior career*
Years	Team	Apps	(Gls)
2011–2012	Shanghai Zobon	?	(?)
2013	Shanghai Dongya	1	(0)
2014–2018	Shanghai Shenxin	106	(15)
2019–2022	Shanghai Shenhua	12	(2)
2020	→ Wuhan Three Towns (loan)	8	(3)
2023	Shanghai Jiading Huilong	13	(1)
2024	Foshan Nanshi	22	(5)
2025	Shanghai Jiading Huilong	19	(1)
- * Club domestic league appearances and goals as of 31 December 2020

Wu Yizhen (Chinese: 吴毅臻; pinyin: Wú Yìzhēn; born 26 May 1994 in Shanghai) is a Chinese football player.

== Club career ==
Wu started his professional football career in 2011 when he was promoted to Shanghai Zobon's squad for the 2011 China League Two campaign. He joined Chinese Super League's newcomer Shanghai Dongya in 2013. On 21 May 2013, he made his debut for Shanghai Dongya in the third round of 2013 Chinese FA Cup which Shanghai beat Chongqing Lifan in the penalty shootout. On 25 June 2013, Wu made his Super League debut in a 1–0 away defeat against Guangzhou Evergrande, coming on as a substitute for Lü Wenjun in the 65th minute. In January 2014, Wu signed for Shanghai Dongya's city rival Shanghai Shenxin. At Shanghai Shenxin he would make his debut in a league game against Shanghai Greenland Shenhua on 9 March 2014 in a 2-0 defeat. This was eventually followed by his first goal for the club on 16 May 2015 in a league game against Guangzhou R&F F.C. in a 3-1 victory. The club would be relegated at the end of the 2015 Chinese Super League and Wu remained with the team as they played in the second tier.

Wu transferred to Chinese Super League side Shanghai Greenland Shenhua in December 2018. He would make his debut in a league game against Hebei China Fortune F.C. on 10 March 2019 that ended in a 2-1 defeat. He would go on to score his first goal for the club on 27 April 2019 in 3-2 defeat to Tianjin Tianhai F.C.

== Career statistics ==
As of match played 26 October 2024

Appearances and goals by club, season and competition
Club performance			League		Cup		Continental		Other		Total	
Club	Season	League	Apps	Goals	Apps	Goals	Apps	Goals	Apps	Goals	Apps	Goals
Shanghai Zobon	2011	China League Two			-		-		-			
Shanghai Zobon	2012	China League Two			0	0	-		-			
Shanghai Zobon	Total				0	0	0	0	0	0		
Shanghai Dongya	2013	Chinese Super League	1	0	2	0	-		-		3	0
Shanghai Shenxin	2014	Chinese Super League	15	0	0	0	-		-		15	0
Shanghai Shenxin	2015	Chinese Super League	26	4	1	0	-		-		27	4
Shanghai Shenxin	2016	China League One	27	3	1	0	-		-		28	3
Shanghai Shenxin	2017	China League One	11	0	2	0	-		-		13	0
Shanghai Shenxin	2018	China League One	27	8	2	0	-		-		29	8
Shanghai Shenxin	Total		106	15	6	0	0	0	0	0	112	15
Shanghai Greenland Shenhua	2019	Chinese Super League	12	2	1	0	-		-		13	2
Wuhan Three Towns (loan)	2020	China League Two	8	3	-		-		-		8	3
Shanghai Shenxin	2023	China League One	13	1	0	0	-		-		13	1
Foshan Nanshi	2024	China League One	22	5	2	0	-		-		24	5
Career total			162	26	12	0	0	0	0	0	173	26

== Honours ==
=== Club ===
Shanghai Shenhua

- Chinese FA Cup: 2019

Wuhan Three Towns

- China League Two: 2020
