= Chen Zhiming =

Chinese mathematician

- 陈志明
- Born: July 1965 (age 61); Suzhou, Jiangsu, China
- Education: Nanjing University; University of Augsburg
- Scientific career
- Fields: Computational mathematics
- Workplaces: Chinese Academy of Sciences

Chen Zhiming (simplified Chinese: 陈志明; traditional Chinese: 陳志明; pinyin: Chen Zhiming; born July 1965) is a Chinese mathematician and the current director of the State Key Laboratory of Scientific and Engineering Computing and the Institute of Computational Mathematics and Scientific Engineering Computing.

== Biography ==
Chen was born in Suzhou, Jiangsu in July 1965. In July 1986 he graduated from Nanjing University. He received a master's degree in mathematics from the Institute of mathematics, Chinese Academy of Sciences in July 1989. He pursued advanced studies in Germany, earning his doctor's degree from the University of Augsburg in 1992.

Chen returned to China in June 1994 and that year became a researcher at the Institute of mathematics, Chinese Academy of Sciences. He was an invited speaker of the International Congress of Mathematicians in 2006 in Madrid.

== Recognition ==
Chen was elected a member of the Chinese Academy of Sciences on November 28, 2017. He was elected as a Fellow of the Society for Industrial and Applied Mathematics, in the 2022 Class of SIAM Fellows, "for significant contributions to adaptive finite element methods, multiscale analysis and computation, and seismic imaging".

- 2000 National Science Fund for Distinguished Young Scholars
- 2001 Feng Kang Prize for Scientific Computing
- 2006 National Outstanding Youth Science Fund Award
- 2009 Second Class Prize of National Natural Science Prize
- 2015 Shiing-Shen Chern Mathematics Award
