= Cui Min =

Chinese footballer of Korean descent

Cui Min 최민 崔民
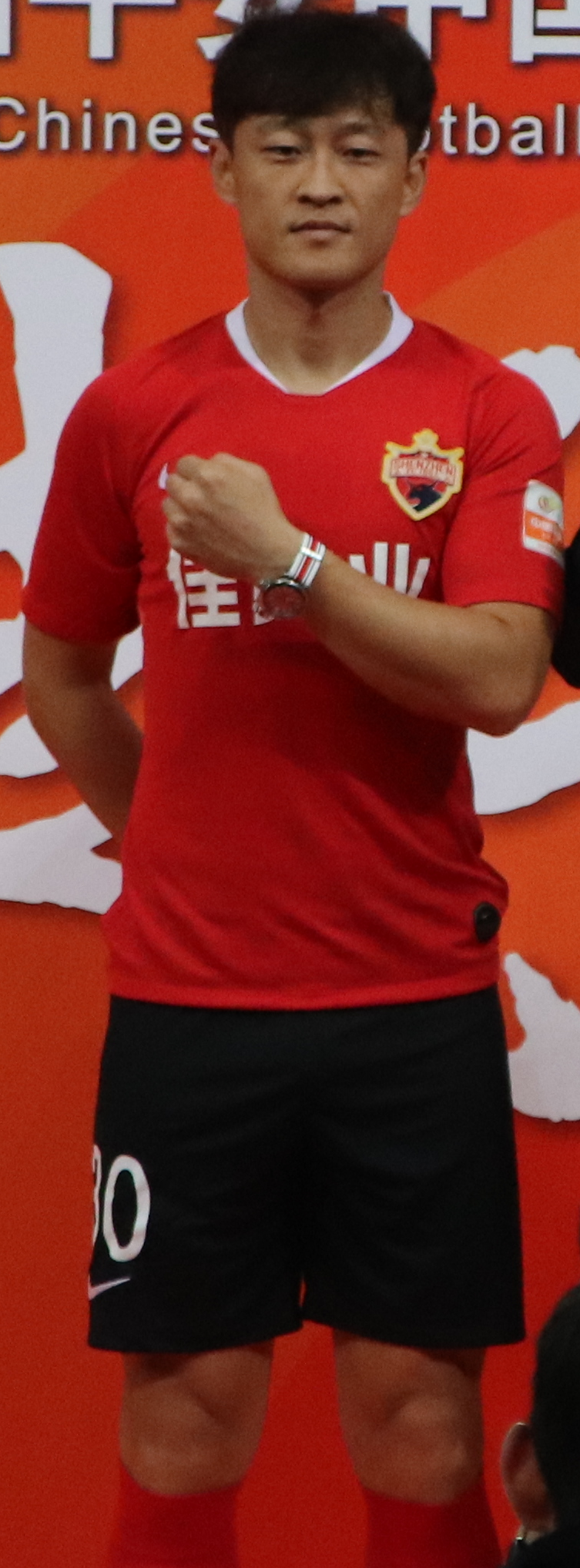

Personal information
- Date of birth: 6 July 1989 (age 37)
- Place of birth: Wangqing, Jilin, China
- Height: 1.82 m (6 ft 0 in)
- Positions: Defender; defensive midfielder

Senior career*
Years	Team	Apps	(Gls)
2010	Yanbian FC	17	(0)
2011–2013	Chongqing Lifan	37	(1)
2013–2016	Yanbian FC	95	(6)
2017–2020	Shenzhen FC	46	(2)

International career^{‡}
2017	China	1	(0)
- * Club domestic league appearances and goals as of 31 December 2021 ‡ National team caps and goals as of 14 January 2017

Cui Min
- Chinese: 崔民
Transcriptions
Standard Mandarin
- Hanyu Pinyin: Cuī Mín
- IPA: [tsʰwéɪ mǐŋ]

Chinese Korean name
- Chosŏn'gŭl: 최민
Transcriptions
- Revised Romanization: Choe Min
- McCune–Reischauer: Ch'oe Min

Cui Min (Chinese: 崔民; Korean: 최민; born 6 July 1989) is a Chinese former footballer who played as defender or defensive midfielder for Yanbian FC, Chongqing Lifan and Shenzhen FC.

== Club career ==
Cui Min started his professional football career in 2010 when he was promoted to second tier football club Yanbian FC's first team squad. On 15 February 2011, Cui moved to China League One side Chongqing Lifan. After three seasons with Chongqing on 2 July 2013, Cui returned to Yanbian FC. His return would see him establish himself as a vital member of the team and by the end of the 2015 China League One campaign he would win the division title with Yanbian. On 5 March 2016, Cui made his Super League debut in the first match of 2016 season against Shanghai Shenhua in a game that ended in a 1-1 draw.

On 23 January 2017, Cui transferred to League One side Shenzhen FC. He would make his debut for the club on 12 March 2017 in a league game against Dalian Transcendence F.C. that ended in a 6-0 victory. The following season he would go on to aid the team gain promotion to the top tier when the club came runners-up within the league at the end of the 2018 China League One campaign.

In his return to the Chinese Super League, on 2 March 2019 against Hebei China Fortune he tore his thigh muscle in a 3-1 victory. Initially he would only miss three weeks before he returned to the team from the injury, however the severity of the damage would ultimately see him miss the rest of the season. The following campaign Cui would have difficulty getting opportunities in the team and be moved to the reserves. After plans to be loaned out did not materialise, Cui would decide to retire from playing after his contract with Shenzhen finished.

== International career ==
On 14 January 2017, Cui made his debut for Chinese national team in the third-place playoff of 2017 China Cup against Croatia.

== Career statistics ==
Statistics accurate as of match played 31 December 2021.

Appearances and goals by club, season and competition
Club	Season	League			National Cup		Continental		Other		Total	
Club	Season	Division	Apps	Goals	Apps	Goals	Apps	Goals	Apps	Goals	Apps	Goals
Yanbian FC	2010	China League One	17	0	0	0	-		-		17	0
Chongqing Lifan	2011	China League One	20	0	0	0	-		-		20	0
Chongqing Lifan	2012	China League One	16	1	1	0	-		-		17	1
Chongqing Lifan	2013	China League One	1	0	2	0	-		-		3	0
Chongqing Lifan	Total		37	1	3	0	0	0	0	0	40	1
Yanbian FC	2013	China League One	14	1	0	0	-		-		14	1
Yanbian FC	2014	China League One	23	2	2	0	-		-		25	2
Yanbian FC	2015	China League One	28	2	0	0	-		-		28	2
Yanbian FC	2016	Chinese Super League	30	1	0	0	-		-		30	1
Yanbian FC	Total		95	6	2	0	0	0	0	0	97	6
Shenzhen	2017	China League One	19	0	0	0	-		-		19	0
Shenzhen	2018	China League One	23	2	0	0	-		-		23	2
Shenzhen	2019	Chinese Super League	4	0	1	0	-		-		5	0
Shenzhen	Total		46	2	1	0	0	0	0	0	47	2
Career total			195	9	6	0	0	0	0	0	201	9

== Honours ==
=== Club ===
Yanbian FC

- China League One: 2015
