= Dong Yifan =

Chinese footballer

Dong Yifan 董一凡
Personal information
- Date of birth: March 8, 1992 (age 34)
- Place of birth: Harbin, Heilongjiang, China
- Height: 1.85 m (6 ft 1 in)
- Position: Goalkeeper

Team information
- Current team: Changchun Yatai
- Number: 13

Youth career
- Changchun Yatai

Senior career*
Years	Team	Apps	(Gls)
2010–2020	Changchun Yatai	38	(0)
2013–2014	→ Lijiang Jiayunhao (loan)	23	(0)
2021	Zibo Cuju	11	(0)
2022–2024	Guangxi Pingguo Haliao	78	(0)
2025	Jiangxi Dingnan United	26	(0)
2026–	Changchun Yatai	0	(0)
- * Club domestic league appearances and goals as of 25 November 2022

Dong Yifan (Chinese: 董一凡; born 8 March 1992), former name Yi Fan (Chinese: 祎凡), is a Chinese football player who currently plays for China League One side Changchun Yatai.

== Club career ==
In 2010, Yi Fan started his professional footballer career with Changchun Yatai in the Chinese Super League. On 7 February 2013, Yi was loaned to China League Two side Lijiang Jiayunhao until 31 December 2014. On 21 August 2016, Yi made his debut for Changchun in the 2016 Chinese Super League against Yanbian Funde.

== Career statistics ==
Statistics accurate as of match played 31 December 2024.

Appearances and goals by club, season and competition
Club	Season	League			National Cup		Continental		Other		Total	
Club	Season	Division	Apps	Goals	Apps	Goals	Apps	Goals	Apps	Goals	Apps	Goals
Changchun Yatai	2010	Chinese Super League	0	0	0	0	0	0	-		0	0
Changchun Yatai	2011	Chinese Super League	0	0	0	0	-		-		0	0
Changchun Yatai	2012	Chinese Super League	0	0	0	0	-		-		0	0
Changchun Yatai	2015	Chinese Super League	0	0	0	0	-		-		0	0
Changchun Yatai	2016	Chinese Super League	8	0	1	0	-		-		9	0
Changchun Yatai	2017	Chinese Super League	7	0	1	0	-		-		8	0
Changchun Yatai	2018	Chinese Super League	23	0	0	0	-		-		23	0
Changchun Yatai	2019	China League One	0	0	0	0	-		-		0	0
Changchun Yatai	Total		38	0	2	0	0	0	0	0	40	0
Lijiang Jiayunhao (Loan)	2013	China League Two	5	0	-		-		-		5	0
Lijiang Jiayunhao (Loan)	2014	China League Two	18	0	4	0	-		-		22	0
Lijiang Jiayunhao (Loan)	Total		23	0	4	0	0	0	0	0	27	0
Zibo Cuju	2021	China League One	11	0	2	0	-		-		13	0
Guangxi Pingguo Haliao	2022	China League One	24	0	0	0	-		-		24	0
Guangxi Pingguo Haliao	2023	China League One	27	0	0	0	-		-		27	0
Guangxi Pingguo Haliao	2024	China League One	27	0	1	0	-		-		28	0
Guangxi Pingguo Haliao	Total		78	0	1	0	0	0	0	0	79	0
Career total			150	0	9	0	0	0	0	0	159	0
