= Xu Wanquan =

Chinese footballer

Xu Wanquan 许万权
Personal information
- Date of birth: April 19, 1993 (age 33)
- Place of birth: Dalian, Liaoning, China
- Height: 1.82 m (5 ft 11 1/2 in)
- Position: Defender

Senior career*
Years	Team	Apps	(Gls)
2012–2015	Liaoning Whowin	1	(0)
2012–2013	→ Xinjiang Youth (loan)	12	(1)
2016–2020	Chengdu Qbao	30	(0)
- * Club domestic league appearances and goals as of 31 December 2020

Xu Wanquan (Chinese: 许万权; born 19 April 1993) is a Chinese football player.

== Club career ==
In 2012, Xu Wanquan started his professional footballer career with Liaoning Whowin in the Chinese Super League. In July 2012, Xu moved to China League Two side Xinjiang Youth on a one-year loan deal. He would eventually make his league debut for Liaoning on 2 November 2014 in a game against Shanghai Shenhua.

On 14 March 2016, Xu transferred to China League Two side Chengdu Qbao. On 8 January 2016 the club relocated to the city of Chengdu and he would move with them as they renamed themselves Chengdu Qbao. Chengdu Qbao withdrew from League Two in 2018 when the Qbao Group was under investigation with illegal fund raising. On 20 March 2018, the club was taken over by Chengdu Better City Investment Group Co., Ltd. and Xu would stay with the club as they participated in the 2018 Chinese Champions League.

== Career statistics ==
Statistics accurate as of match played 31 December 2020.

Appearances and goals by club, season and competition
Club	Season	League			National Cup		Continental		Other		Total	
Club	Season	Division	Apps	Goals	Apps	Goals	Apps	Goals	Apps	Goals	Apps	Goals
Liaoning Whowin	2012	Chinese Super League	0	0	0	0	-		-		0	0
Liaoning Whowin	2014	Chinese Super League	1	0	0	0	-		-		1	0
Liaoning Whowin	2015	Chinese Super League	0	0	0	0	-		-		0	0
Liaoning Whowin	Total		1	0	0	0	0	0	0	0	1	0
Xinjiang Youth (loan)	2012	China League Two	12	1	-		-		-		12	1
Xinjiang Youth (loan)	2013	-	-		0	0	-		-		0	0
Xinjiang Youth (loan)	Total		12	1	0	0	0	0	0	0	12	1
Chengdu Qbao	2016	China League Two	18	0	1	0	-		-		19	0
Chengdu Qbao	2017	China League Two	12	0	1	0	-		-		13	0
Chengdu Qbao	2018	Chinese Champions League	-		-		-		-		-	-
Chengdu Qbao	2019	China League Two	0	0	0	0	-		-		0	0
Chengdu Qbao	Total		30	0	2	0	0	0	0	0	32	0
Career total			43	1	2	0	0	0	0	0	45	1
