= Zhang Jianhong =

- Born: March 6, 1958
- Died: December 31, 2010 (aged 52)
- Writing career
- Pen name: Li Hong
- Criminal charges: Inciting subversion of state power
- Criminal penalty: 6 years imprisonment

Zhang Jianhong (張建紅) (March 6, 1958 – December 31, 2010), pen name Li Hong (力虹), was a freelance writer, playwright, poet, democracy and human rights activist in China. He was born on March 6, 1958, in Ningbo city of Zhejiang Province.

Zhang was sentenced to "re-education through labor" (RTL) from 1989 to 1991 on charges of "counter-revolutionary propaganda" for his pro-democracy activities.

== Journalism ==
In August 2005 Zhang and his friends founded the literary, news, and poem website Aegean Sea, Aiqinhai.net, of which he was the editor-in-chief. Aegean Sea was renowned for its daring articles but was shut down by the authorities on March 9, 2006. After, that Zhang became a regular contributor to the overseas Chinese Epoch Times and often published articles depicting current fraud and corruption and criticizing the China Communist Party (CCP).

=== Articles considered slander by Chinese government ===
Zhang was accused of writing 60 articles that "slandered the government and China's socialist system" and “inciting subversion of state power.” His articles written in 2006 include:

- The Stolen Organs are Screaming
- Olympic Games will start while Organ Harvest is still increasing
- Facing Organ Harvest, Laws Are Going to Be Legislated
- Facing Investigation Report, What Will Bush Say?
- Willing to Participate This Historic Investigation
- What Does Wu Hongda Want to Do?
- Spreading Nine-Commentaries & Promoting Quitting-CCP-System are the Barriers that CCP can not Pass
- Return Me Gao Zhisheng, Return Me The Conscience of China

== Arrest ==
Days after Zhang posted an essay online about China's human rights record and, in particular, the treatment of journalists and their sources in the run-up to the 2008 Olympic games, on the evening of September 6, 2006 over 20 CCP policemen raided Zhang's home in Ningbo and arrested him, according to his wife Dong Min.

== Sentencing and detainment ==
On March 19, 2007, Zhang was sentenced for six years in prison plus one year's deprivation of political rights by the Senior People's Court of Zhejiang Province that was controlled by CCP Central Political and Law Commission.

=== Illness ===
After that, Zhang was immediately transferred to Huzhou Changhu prison. In Changhu prison Zhang was reportedly suffering from muscle necrosis, a condition that was made worse due to lack of adequate medical care in jail. A medical evaluation determined that he suffered from a rare nerve disorder that could lead to permanent paralysis if not treated. On his doctor's advice, he applied for medical parole on 31 May 2007. There was no response to his application; he was instead transferred to Zhejiang Prison.

As Zhang's health was turning worse in Zhejiang Prison, he was sent to Hangzhou Qingchun Hospital (or Zhengjian Central Prison Hospital). It was reported that Zhang's neuron disease is considered incurable. The illness led to his partial paralysis and continued to deteriorate despite transfer to the General Hospital of Zhejiang Prison in Hangzhou City. He could not eat and was on an IV drip. His life was at stake.

Dong Min repeatedly applied medical parole for him, but CCP rejected the appeal.

=== Support from abroad ===
Since Zhang was arrested, many overseas human rights supporters appealed for him.

== Medical parole and death ==
On June 5, 2010, at 5pm, Lihong was released on medical parole and was sent to a hospital in Ningbo, Lihong's hometown. Lihong was in critical condition, and his family could not afford the huge medical cost. On June 9 it was confirmed that the Chinese authority had blocked two donation accounts for accepting overseas funds. He died on New Year's Eve 2010. His body was quickly cremated by the authorities, and 10 of his friends were put under house arrest to prevent them from holding a memorial for him.
