= Li Mou =

Chinese footballer

Li Mou 李谋
Personal information
- Date of birth: 8 March 1989 (age 37)
- Place of birth: Tieling, Liaoning, China
- Height: 1.82 m (6 ft 0 in)
- Position: Defender

Team information
- Current team: Qingdao Jonoon
- Number: 3

Senior career*
Years	Team	Apps	(Gls)
2009–2010	Liaoning Whowin	1	(0)
2011–2013	Changchun Yatai	16	(0)
2013–2014	Chengdu Tiancheng	16	(0)
2015–	Qingdao Jonoon	105	(0)
- * Club domestic league appearances and goals as of 31 December 2020

Li Mou (Chinese: 李谋; (former name: 李眸); born 8 March 1989 in Tieling) is a Chinese football player who currently plays for China League Two side Qingdao Jonoon.

== Club career ==
In 2009, Li Mou started his professional footballer career with Liaoning Whowin in the China League One. In March 2011, Li transferred to Chinese Super League side Changchun Yatai. He would eventually make his league debut for Changchun on 2 April 2011 in a game against Henan Jianye. In July 2013, Li transferred to China League One side Chengdu Tiancheng.

On 14 February 2015, Li transferred to fellow China League One side Qingdao Jonoon.

== Career statistics ==
Statistics accurate as of match played 31 December 2020.

Appearances and goals by club, season and competition
Club	Season	League			National Cup		League Cup		Continental		Total	
Club	Season	Division	Apps	Goals	Apps	Goals	Apps	Goals	Apps	Goals	Apps	Goals
Liaoning Whowin	2009	China League One	1	0	-		-		-		1	0
Liaoning Whowin	2010	Chinese Super League	0	0	-		-		-		0	0
Liaoning Whowin	Total		1	0	0	0	0	0	0	0	1	0
Changchun Yatai	2011	Chinese Super League	7	0	0	0	-		-		7	0
Changchun Yatai	2012	Chinese Super League	9	0	1	0	-		-		10	0
Changchun Yatai	2013	Chinese Super League	0	0	0	0	-		-		0	0
Changchun Yatai	Total		16	0	1	0	0	0	0	0	17	0
Chengdu Tiancheng	2013	China League One	8	0	0	0	-		-		8	0
Chengdu Tiancheng	2014	China League One	8	0	1	0	-		-		9	0
Chengdu Tiancheng	Total		16	0	1	0	0	0	0	0	17	0
Qingdao Jonoon	2015	China League One	16	0	2	0	-		-		18	0
Qingdao Jonoon	2016	China League One	19	0	2	0	-		-		21	0
Qingdao Jonoon	2017	China League Two	19	0	1	0	-		-		20	0
Qingdao Jonoon	2018	China League Two	27	0	2	0	-		-		29	0
Qingdao Jonoon	2019	China League Two	24	0	3	1	-		-		27	1
Qingdao Jonoon	Total		105	0	10	1	0	0	0	0	115	1
Career total			138	0	12	1	0	0	0	0	150	1

== Honours ==
=== Club ===
Liaoning Whowin

- China League One: 2009
