= Wang Jingping =

Chinese footballer

Wang Jingping 王敬平
Personal information
- Date of birth: 26 December 1992 (age 33)
- Place of birth: Dalian, Liaoning, China
- Height: 1.96 m (6 ft 5 in)
- Position: Goalkeeper

Team information
- Current team: Dandong Tengyue

Senior career*
Years	Team	Apps	(Gls)
2013	Dalian Aerbin	0	(0)
2014–2019	Zhejiang Yiteng	46	(0)
2020	Wuxi Wugou	-	(-)
2021–	Dandong Tengyue	0	(0)
- * Club domestic league appearances and goals as of 31 December 2020

Wang Jingping (Chinese: 王敬平; born 26 December 1992 in Dalian, Liaoning) is a Chinese football player who currently plays for China League Two side Dandong Tengyue.

== Club career ==
In 2013, Wang Jingping started his professional footballer career with Dalian Aerbin in the Chinese Super League. On 28 February 2014, Wang transferred to Chinese Super League side Harbin Yiteng. He would eventually make his league debut for Harbin on 25 May 2014 in a game against Guangzhou R&F.

== Career statistics ==
Statistics accurate as of match played 31 December 2020.

Appearances and goals by club, season and competition
Club	Season	League			National Cup		Continental		Other		Total	
Club	Season	Division	Apps	Goals	Apps	Goals	Apps	Goals	Apps	Goals	Apps	Goals
Dalian Aerbin	2013	Chinese Super League	0	0	0	0	-		-		0	0
Zhejiang Yiteng	2014	Chinese Super League	4	0	1	0	-		-		5	0
Zhejiang Yiteng	2015	China League One	0	0	0	0	-		-		0	0
Zhejiang Yiteng	2016	China League One	1	0	0	0	-		-		1	0
Zhejiang Yiteng	2017	China League One	0	0	0	0	-		-		0	0
Zhejiang Yiteng	2018	China League One	25	0	0	0	-		-		25	0
Zhejiang Yiteng	2019	China League Two	16	0	1	0	-		-		17	0
Zhejiang Yiteng	Total		46	0	2	0	0	0	0	0	48	0
Wuxi Wugou	2020	CMCL	-		-		-		-		0	0
Dandong Tengyue	2021	China League Two	0	0	0	0	-		-		0	0
Career total			46	0	2	0	0	0	0	0	48	0
