= Shen Tianfeng =

Chinese footballer (born 1994)

Shen Tianfeng 沈田峰
Personal information
- Date of birth: 18 March 1994 (age 32)
- Place of birth: Shenyang, Liaoning, China
- Height: 1.87 m (6 ft 1 1/2 in)
- Position: Forward

Youth career
- –2012: Guizhou Renhe

Senior career*
Years	Team	Apps	(Gls)
2011–2017	Beijing Renhe	15	(2)
2011	→ Shaanxi Laochenggen (loan)	13	(4)
2013	→ Shaanxi Laochenggen (loan)	0	(0)
2013	→ Chongqing FC (loan)	1	(0)
2017	→ Jiangxi Liansheng (loan)	12	(1)
2018–2019	Suzhou Dongwu	4	(0)
2022	Chongqing Tonglianglong		

International career
2009–2010	China U-17		
2012	China U-20		
2012–2013	China U-22		
- * Club domestic league appearances and goals as of 31 December 2019

Shen Tianfeng (Chinese: 沈田峰; pinyin: Shěn Tiánfēng; born 18 March 1994 in Shenyang) is a retired Chinese football player.

== Club career ==
Shen started his football career in 2011 when he was loaned to China League Two club Xi'an Laochenggen for one year. He made 13 appearances and scored four goals in the 2011 league season. He was promoted to Guizhou Renhe's first team squad by Gao Hongbo in the summer of 2012. On 19 July 2012, he made his debut and scored his first goal for Guizhou Renhe in the fourth round of 2012 Chinese FA Cup which Guizhou beat Dalian Shide 2–0. His Super League debut came on 9 days later, on 28 July, in a 3–1 away defeat against Henan Jianye, coming on as a substitute for Liu Tianqi in the 55th minute. He scored his first Super League goal on 6 October 2012, which ensured Guizhou Renhe beat Shanghai Shenhua 4–2 at Guiyang Olympic Sports Center. He made five appearances and scored two goals in the 2012 season as the club achieved fourth place in the Super League and runners-up in the FA Cup and gained the entry into AFC Champions League for the first time.

He was loaned to Shaanxi Laochenggen again in March 2013. On 6 July 2013, Shen joined China League One side Chongqing FC on loan until 31 December. He played only one match for Chongqing FC (against Harbin Yiteng on 14 July) and returned to Guizhou after Chongqing relegated.

In 2018, Shen joined League Two side Suzhou Dongwu.

== Career statistics ==
Statistics accurate as of match played 31 December 2019.

Appearances and goals by club, season and competition
Club	Season	League			National Cup		Continental		Other		Total	
Club	Season	Division	Apps	Goals	Apps	Goals	Apps	Goals	Apps	Goals	Apps	Goals
Guizhou Renhe	2011	Chinese Super League	0	0	0	0	-		-		0	0
Guizhou Renhe	2012	Chinese Super League	3	1	2	1	-		-		5	2
Guizhou Renhe	2014	Chinese Super League	1	0	0	0	1	0	-		2	0
Guizhou Renhe	2015	Chinese Super League	4	0	1	0	-		-		5	0
Guizhou Renhe	2016	China League One	7	1	2	0	-		-		9	1
Guizhou Renhe	2017	China League One	0	0	2	0	-		-		2	0
Guizhou Renhe	Total		15	2	7	1	1	0	0	0	23	3
Shaanxi Laochenggen (loan)	2011	China League Two	13	4	-		-		-		13	4
Shaanxi Laochenggen (loan)	2013	China League Two	0	0	2	1	-		-		2	1
Chongqing F.C. (loan)	2013	China League One	1	0	0	0	-		-		1	0
Jiangxi Liansheng (loan)	2017	China League Two	12	1	0	0	-		-		12	1
Suzhou Dongwu	2018	China League Two	0	0	0	0	-		-		0	0
Suzhou Dongwu	2019	China League Two	4	0	1	0	-		-		5	0
Suzhou Dongwu	Total		4	0	1	0	0	0	0	0	5	0
Career total			45	7	10	2	1	0	0	0	56	9
