= Liu Yang (footballer, born 1991) =

Chinese footballer

Liu Yang 刘洋
Personal information
- Date of birth: 9 February 1991 (age 35)
- Place of birth: Bengbu, Anhui, China
- Height: 1.88 m (6 ft 2 in)
- Position: Defender

Team information
- Current team: Ningbo FC
- Number: 30

Youth career
- Shandong Luneng

Senior career*
Years	Team	Apps	(Gls)
2011–2013	Shandong Luneng	17	(0)
2014	Wuhan Zall	14	(0)
2015–2018	Beijing Renhe	44	(0)
2019–2020	Tianjin TEDA	43	(0)
2021–2023	Cangzhou Mighty Lions	56	(0)
2024	Guangxi Pingguo Haliao	14	(0)
2025–	Ningbo FC	24	(0)
- * Club domestic league appearances and goals as of 31 January 2023

Liu Yang (Chinese: 刘洋; born 9 February 1991) is a Chinese football player who currently plays for China League One side Ningbo FC.

== Club career ==
In 2011, Liu Yang started his professional footballer career with Shandong Luneng in the Chinese Super League. He would eventually make his league debut for Shandong on 29 October 2011 in a game against Shenzhen Ruby, coming on as a substitute for Han Peng in the 90th minute. Under the Head coach Henk ten Cate, Liu would start to become a regular within the squad, however the club finished in a disappointing twelfth in the 2012 Chinese Super League campaign and under the new manager Radomir Antić he would lose his place within the first team.

On 30 December 2013, Liu transferred to China League One side Wuhan Zall with a fee of ¥3,500,000. After only one season and the chance to join another top tier club, Liu left Wuhan to join Guizhou Renhe where he would make his debut in a league game on 7 March 2015 against Liaoning Whowin that ended in a 1–0 defeat. While he would establish himself as a regular within the team by making twenty eight appearances within the league he was unfortunately a member of the squad that saw the club relegated at the end of the 2015 league season. At the beginning of the 2016 league season the club would move cities to Beijing and rename themselves Beijing Renhe. Zhu would stay with the team and at the end of the 2017 league season he was part of the squad that gained promotion back into the top tier.

Liu moved to Chinese Super League side Tianjin TEDA in February 2019. He would make his debut in a league game on 8 March 2019 against Guangzhou Evergrande that ended in a 1–0 defeat. After two seasons he would join fellow top tier club Cangzhou Mighty Lions on 8 April 2021. He would make his debut in a league game on 21 April 2021 against Qingdao F.C. in a 2-1 defeat. Despite the loss he would go on to establish himself a regular within the team by making 22 league appearances throughout the season.

== Career statistics ==
Statistics accurate as of match played 31 January 2023.

Appearances and goals by club, season and competition
Club	Season	League			National Cup		Continental		Other		Total	
Club	Season	Division	Apps	Goals	Apps	Goals	Apps	Goals	Apps	Goals	Apps	Goals
Shandong Luneng	2011	Chinese Super League	1	0	0	0	-		0	0	1	0
Shandong Luneng	2012	Chinese Super League	16	0	3	0	-		-		19	0
Shandong Luneng	2013	Chinese Super League	0	0	0	0	-		-		0	0
Shandong Luneng	Total		17	0	3	0	0	0	0	0	20	0
Wuhan Zall	2014	China League One	14	0	1	0	-		-		15	0
Guizhou Renhe / Beijing Renhe	2015	Chinese Super League	28	0	1	0	-		-		29	0
Guizhou Renhe / Beijing Renhe	2016	China League One	3	0	2	0	-		-		5	0
Guizhou Renhe / Beijing Renhe	2017	China League One	9	0	1	0	-		-		10	0
Guizhou Renhe / Beijing Renhe	2018	Chinese Super League	4	0	1	0	-		-		5	0
Guizhou Renhe / Beijing Renhe	Total		44	0	5	0	0	0	0	0	49	0
Tianjin TEDA	2019	Chinese Super League	27	0	0	0	-		-		27	0
Tianjin TEDA	2020	Chinese Super League	16	0	5	0	-		-		21	0
Tianjin TEDA	Total		43	0	5	0	0	0	0	0	48	0
Cangzhou Mighty Lions	2021	Chinese Super League	22	0	2	0	-		-		24	0
Cangzhou Mighty Lions	2022	Chinese Super League	11	0	0	0	-		-		11	0
Cangzhou Mighty Lions	Total		33	0	2	0	0	0	0	0	35	0
Career total			151	0	16	0	0	0	0	0	167	0
