= Fan Baiqun =

Chinese football player

Fan Baiqun 范柏群
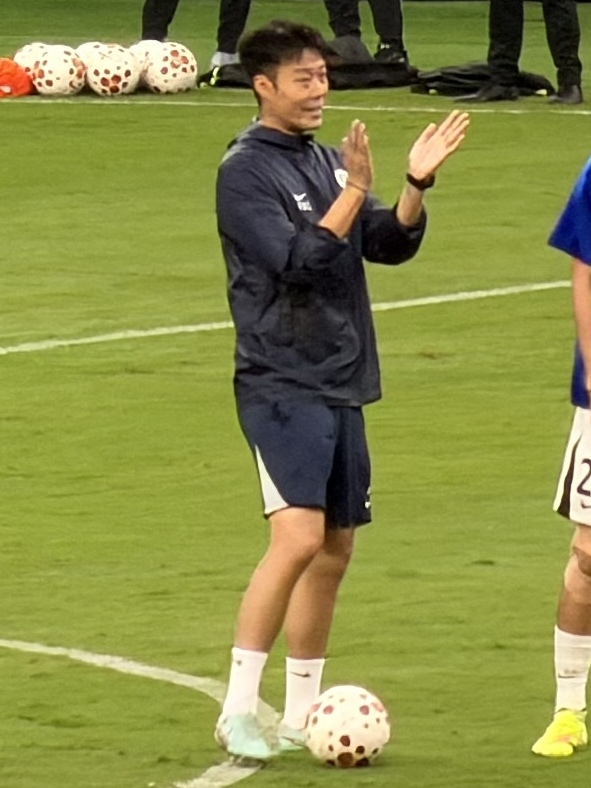
- Fan in 2026

Personal information
- Date of birth: February 18, 1986 (age 40)
- Place of birth: Tianjin, China
- Height: 1.78 m (5 ft 10 in)
- Position: Midfielder

Team information
- Current team: Shaanxi Union (assistant coach)

Youth career
- Tianjin TEDA

Senior career*
Years	Team	Apps	(Gls)
2005–2016	Tianjin TEDA	36	(1)
2012	→ Shenyang Shenbei (loan)	21	(0)
2013–2014	→ Tianjin Songjiang (loan)	51	(5)
2017	Sichuan Longfor	20	(1)
2018–2020	Zhejiang Greentown	1	(0)

Managerial career
- 2024–2025: Tianjin Jinmen Tiger U-15
- 2026: Shenzhen Peng City (assistant)
- 2026–: Shaanxi Union (assistant)
- * Club domestic league appearances and goals as of 31 December 2020

Fan Baiqun (Chinese: 范柏群; born 18 February 1986) is a Chinese football coach and former player.

== Club career ==
In 2005, Fan Baiqun started his professional footballer career with Tianjin Teda in the Chinese Super League. He eventually made his Super League debut for Tianjin on 30 March 2008 in a game against Hangzhou Greentown. In February 2012, Fan was loaned to China League One side Shenyang Shenbei until 31 December. In January 2013, Fan was loaned to another League One club Tianjin Songjiang for one year. Tianjin Songjiang extended his loan deal for one year in December 2013.

On 25 January 2017, Fan moved to League Two side Sichuan Longfor. On 31 January 2018, Fan transferred to China League One side Zhejiang Greentown.

== Career statistics ==
Statistics accurate as of match played 31 December 2020.

Appearances and goals by club, season and competition
Club	Season	League			National Cup		League Cup		Continental		Total	
Club	Season	Division	Apps	Goals	Apps	Goals	Apps	Goals	Apps	Goals	Apps	Goals
Tianjin Teda	2005	Chinese Super League	0	0	0	0	0	0	-		0	0
Tianjin Teda	2007	Chinese Super League	0	0	-		-		-		0	0
Tianjin Teda	2008	Chinese Super League	6	0	-		-		-		6	0
Tianjin Teda	2009	Chinese Super League	2	0	-		-		0	0	2	0
Tianjin Teda	2010	Chinese Super League	5	0	-		-		-		5	0
Tianjin Teda	2011	Chinese Super League	3	0	-		-		1	0	4	0
Tianjin Teda	2015	Chinese Super League	7	0	2	0	-		-		9	0
Tianjin Teda	2016	Chinese Super League	13	1	2	0	-		-		15	1
Tianjin Teda	Total		36	1	4	0	0	0	0	0	40	1
Shenyang Shenbei (loan)	2012	China League One	21	0	2	0	-		-		23	0
Tianjin Songjiang (loan)	2013	China League One	23	1	0	0	-		-		23	1
Tianjin Songjiang (loan)	2014	China League One	28	4	0	0	-		-		28	4
Tianjin Songjiang (loan)	Total		51	5	0	0	0	0	0	0	51	5
Sichuan Longfor	2017	China League Two	20	1	1	0	-		-		21	1
Zhejiang Greentown	2018	China League One	1	0	1	0	-		-		2	0
Career total			129	7	8	0	0	0	1	0	138	7
