= Xu Qi =

Chinese footballer (born 1992)

Xu Qi 许琦
Personal information
- Date of birth: March 9, 1992 (age 34)
- Place of birth: Shanghai, China
- Height: 1.79 m (5 ft 10 1/2 in)
- Position: Midfielder

Team information
- Current team: Shanghai Shenhua

Senior career*
Years	Team	Apps	(Gls)
2011–2015	Shanghai Shenhua	1	(0)
2013	→ Jiangxi Liansheng (loan)	4	(0)
2013	→ Dali Ruilong (loan)	4	(1)
- * Club domestic league appearances and goals as of 29 November 2014

Xu Qi (Chinese: 许琦; born 9 March 1992) is a Chinese football player.

== Club career ==
In 2011, Xu Qi started his professional footballer career with Shanghai Shenhua in the Chinese Super League. He would eventually make his league debut for Shanghai Shenhua on 14 July 2012 in a game against Beijing Guoan, coming on as a substitute for Jiang Kun in the 70th minute.

== Club career statistics ==
Statistics accurate as of match played 29 November 2015.

Club performance			League		Cup		League Cup		Continental		Total	
Season	Club	League	Apps	Goals	Apps	Goals	Apps	Goals	Apps	Goals	Apps	Goals
China PR			League		FA Cup		CSL Cup		Asia		Total	
2011	Shanghai Shenhua	Chinese Super League	0	0	-		-		0	0	0	0
2012	Shanghai Shenhua	Chinese Super League	1	0	0	0	-		-		1	0
2013	Jiangxi Liansheng	China League Two	4	0	0	0	-		-		4	0
2013	Dali Ruilong	China League Two	4	1	0	0	-		-		4	1
2015	Shanghai Shenhua	Chinese Super League	0	0	0	0	-		-		0	0
Total	China PR		9	1	0	0	0	0	0	0	9	1
