= Lu Zheyu =

Chinese association football player

Personal information
- Date of birth: 8 September 1989 (age 37)
- Place of birth: Tianjin
- Height: 1.90 m (6 ft 3 in)
- Position: Goalkeeper

Team information
- Current team: Tianjin Fusheng

Senior career*
Years	Team	Apps	(Gls)
2010–2017	Tianjin TEDA	0	(0)
2011	→ Jiangsu Sainty (loan)	0	(0)
2013	→ Shenzhen Fengpeng (loan)	6	(0)
2014	→ Tianjin Huaruide (loan)		
2015	→ Baotou Nanjiao (loan)	14	(0)
2017–2019	Baoding Yingli ETS	20	(0)
2020–2021	Sichuan Jiuniu	1	(0)
2022-	Tianjin Fusheng	0	(0)
- * Club domestic league appearances and goals as of 29 April 2022

Lu Zheyu (simplified Chinese: 芦哲宇; traditional Chinese: 蘆哲宇; pinyin: Lú Zhéyǔ; born 8 September 1989) is a Chinese footballer who plays as a goalkeeper for Chinese club Tianjin Fusheng.

== Club career ==
Lu Zheyu was born in Tianjin and would join his local football club Tianjin TEDA where he broke into the senior team within the 2010 Chinese Super League season before he was loaned out to fellow top tier club Jiangsu Sainty as their third choice goalkeeper throughout the second half of the league campaign. After several further loan spells, Lu left Tianjin TEDA and joined Baoding Yingli ETS on a permanent basis.

== Career statistics ==
As of 31 December 2020.

Club	Season	League			Cup		Continental		Other		Total	
Club	Season	Division	Apps	Goals	Apps	Goals	Apps	Goals	Apps	Goals	Apps	Goals
Tianjin TEDA	2010	Chinese Super League	0	0	0	0	–		0	0	0	0
Tianjin TEDA	2011	Chinese Super League	0	0	0	0	0	0	0	0	0	0
Tianjin TEDA	2012	Chinese Super League	0	0	0	0	1 (Note: Appearances in the AFC Champions League)	0	0	0	1	0
Tianjin TEDA	2013	Chinese Super League	0	0	1 (Note: Appearances in the Chinese FA Cup)	0	–		0	0	1	0
Tianjin TEDA	2016	Chinese Super League	0	0	0	0	–		0	0	0	0
Tianjin TEDA	Total		0	0	1	0	1	0	0	0	2	0
Jiangsu Sainty (loan)	2011	Chinese Super League	0	0	0	0	–		0	0	0	0
Shenzhen Fengpeng (loan)	2013	China League Two	6	0	0	0	–		0	0	6	0
Tianjin Huaruide (loan)	2014	Amateur League	–		–		–		0	0	0	0
Baotou Nanjiao (loan)	2015	China League Two	14	0	2	0	–		0	0	16	0
Baoding Yingli ETS	2017	China League One	0	0	1	0	–		0	0	1	0
Baoding Yingli ETS	2018	China League Two	0	0	0	0	–		1 (Note: Appearances in the China League Two playoffs)	0	1	0
Baoding Yingli ETS	2019	China League Two	19	0	2	0	–		0	0	21	0
Baoding Yingli ETS	Total		19	0	3	0	0	0	1	0	23	0
Career total			39	0	6	0	1	0	1	0	46	0
