= Shandong Tengding F.C. =

Chinese football club

Shandong Tengding
- Full name: Shandong Tengding Football Club
- Founded: 2012
- Dissolved: 2015
- Ground: Qi Capital Culture Sports City Stadium, Zibo
- Capacity: 17,000
- League: China League Two

Shandong Tengding Football Club are a China League Two club. They are an association football club from Zibo. The Qi Capital Culture Sports City Stadium is their home venue.

== Results ==
- As of the end of 2014 season

All-time League rankings

| Season | 2013 | 2014 |
|---|---|---|
| Division | 3 | 3 |
| Position | 4 | 8^{1} |

- ^Note 1 : in North League
