= Yunnan Flying Tigers F.C. =

Chinese football club

Yunnan Flying Tigers Yúnnán Fēihǔ 云南飞虎
- Full name: Yunnan Flying Tigers Football Club 云南飞虎足球俱乐部
- Nickname(s): Flying Tigers
- Founded: 2012
- Dissolved: 2019
- Ground: Lijiang Sports Development Centre Stadium, Lijiang
- Capacity: 22,400
- 2018: League Two, 20th
Home colours	Away colours

Yunnan Flying Tigers Football Club (Chinese: 云南飞虎足球俱乐部) is a defunct professional Chinese football club based in Lijiang, Yunnan. Their home stadium was the Lijiang Sports Development Centre Stadium which has a seating capacity of 22,400. The club's major investors were the Kunming Minjian Mechanical & Electrical Equipment Limited Company along with Lijiang Materials Co. Ltd. and Lijiang Lijiang Taihe Group.

== History ==
After the disbandment of Yunnan Lijiang Dongba F.C. in 2006 it was decided by the Yunnan Sports Bureau, Yunnan Football Association, Lijiang Municipal People's Government, Lijiang Sports Bureau and Lijiang Football Association to help form another professional football team to help represent the province. This was realised in September 2012 when Lijiang Jiayunhao F.C. was officially registered within the Chinese football association to participate the 2013 China League Two division and by December 5, 2012, Niu Hongli was appointed as their first Head coach. The Lijiang Sports Development Centre Stadium was chosen as their home location and the team played in an all green home kit. On May 6, 2013, Kunming Minjian Mechanical & Electrical Equipment Limited Company along with Lijiang Materials Co. Ltd. and Lijiang Lijiang Taihe Group. would all become major investors within the team.

In their debut season the club would reach the divisions play-off where they were knocked out in the quarter-finals by Hebei Zhongji 3–2 on aggregate. By the 2015 league season the club would change their crest and colours to blue. After several seasons where they continued to reach the division play-off the club finally gained promotion when the club's Head coach Zhang Biao led them to win the division after defeating Baoding Yingli ETS 2–0 in the play-off final. In January 2017, Lijiang Jiayunhao F.C. changed their name to Yunnan Lijiang F.C.. Their nickname Flying Tigers is a homage to the famous 1st American Volunteer Group in World War II, nicknamed the Flying Tigers, based in Yunnan Province in China.

In January 2018, Yunnan Lijiang F.C. changed their name to Yunnan Flying Tigers F.C. following their relegation back to China League Two after finishing last in the 2017 China League One. During the season, the club's chairman, He Rongyao, was arrested, and the club was revealed for arrearage of salary at the end of 2018 season. On 26 February 2019, Yunnan Flying Tigers officially withdrew from China League Two, and was dissolved.

== Name history ==
- 2012–2016 Lijiang Jiayunhao F.C. 丽江嘉云昊
- 2017 Yunnan Lijiang F.C. 云南丽江
- 2018 Yunnan Flying Tigers F.C. 云南飞虎

== Managerial history ==
- (China) Niu Hongli (2013)
- (China) Li Hu (2014)
- (China) Wang Zheng (2015–2016)
- (China) Zhang Biao (2016)
- (South Korea) Lim Jong-heon (2017)
- (China) Zhang Biao (caretaker) (2017)
- (Austria) Kurt Garger (2017–2018)
- (China) Huang Yan (2018)

== Honours ==
- China League Two: 2016

== Results ==
All-time league rankings

As of the end of 2018 season.

Year	Div	Pld	W	D	L	GF	GA	GD	Pts	Pos.	FA Cup	Super Cup	AFC	Att./G	Stadium
2013	3	12	7	1	4	17	9	8	22^{1}	6	DNE	DNQ	DNQ		Lijiang Sports Development Centre Stadium
2014	3	16	7	5	4	20	14	6	26^{1}	8	R4	DNQ	DNQ		Lijiang Sports Development Centre Stadium
2015	3	14	7	3	4	19	15	4	24^{1}	7	R2	DNQ	DNQ	6,287	Lijiang Sports Development Centre Stadium
2016	3	23	13	5	5	32	21	11	44	W	R4	DNQ	DNQ	7,356	Lijiang Sports Development Centre Stadium
2017	2	30	4	9	17	31	62	−31	21	16	R3	DNQ	DNQ	4,929	Lijiang Sports Development Centre Stadium
2018	3	28	8	9	11	30	27	3	33	20	R2	DNQ	DNQ	1,308	Lijiang Sports Development Centre Stadium

- ^1 In group stage.

Key

	China top division
	China second division
	China third division
W	Winners
RU	Runners-up
3	Third place
	Relegated

- Pld = Played
- W = Games won
- D = Games drawn
- L = Games lost
- F = Goals for
- A = Goals against
- Pts = Points
- Pos = Final position
- DNQ = Did not qualify
- DNE = Did not enter
- NH = Not Held
- – = Does Not Exist
- R1 = Round 1
- R2 = Round 2
- R3 = Round 3
- R4 = Round 4
- F = Final
- SF = Semi-finals
- QF = Quarter-finals
- R16 = Round of 16
- Group = Group stage
- GS2 = Second Group stage
- QR1 = First Qualifying Round
- QR2 = Second Qualifying Round
- QR3 = Third Qualifying Round
