= Shaanxi Laochenggen F.C. =

Chinese football club

Shaanxi Laochenggen
- Full name: Shaanxi Laochenggen
- Founded: 2012
- Ground: Jiaodaruisun Stadium, Shaanxi, China
- Capacity: 50,100
- League: China Amateur League

Shaanxi Laochenggen is a football club which plays in Xi'an, Shaanxi. Their home stadium is the 50,100 seater Jiaodaruisun Stadium. They play in China Amateur League.
