= List of Chinese football transfers winter 2013 =

This is a list of Chinese football transfers for the 2013 season winter transfer window. Only moves from Super League and League One are listed. The transfer window opened on 1 January 2013 and closed on 28 February 2013.

== Super League ==
=== Beijing Guoan ===
In:

No.	Pos.	Nation	Player
1	GK	CHN	Zhang Sipeng (loan return from Beijing Yitong Kuche)
2	DF	UZB	Egor Krimets (loan from (Uzbekistan) Pakhtakor Tashkent)
38	FW	BRA	André Lima (from (Brazil) Grêmio)
-	MF	CHN	Lu Jiang (loan return from Hunan Billows)

Out:

No.	Pos.	Nation	Player
6	MF	CHN	Xu Liang (to Shanghai Shenhua)
7	MF	CHN	Wang Changqing (to Shanghai Shenhua)
8	FW	POR	Manú (Released)
21	MF	CHN	Zhu Yifan (loan to Henan Jianye)
25	DF	CHN	Jiao Zhe (loan return to Shandong Luneng)
31	FW	CHN	Hu Qiling (to Beijing Baxy)
37	FW	BRA	Reinaldo (to (Brazil) Operário)
38	DF	CHN	Meng Yang (to Meizhou Kejia)
40	DF	SEN	François (Released)
-	MF	CHN	Lu Jiang (to Beijing Baxy)

=== Changchun Yatai ===
In:

No.	Pos.	Nation	Player
3	DF	BRA	Éder Baiano (from (South Korea) Busan IPark)
5	MF	AUS	Matt McKay (from (South Korea) Busan IPark)
8	DF	CHN	Li Xiaoting (from Harbin Yiteng)
9	FW	BRA	Zé Carlos (from (Brazil) Criciúma)
10	FW	BRA	Isac (from (Brazil) América)
13	DF	CHN	Yan Shipeng (from Chongqing F.C.)
27	FW	CHN	Bai Zijian (from (South Korea) Goyang KB)
28	GK	CHN	Wu Yake (loan return from Guizhou Zhicheng)
29	GK	CHN	Song Zhenyu (from Tianjin Teda)
31	FW	CHN	Yang He (loan return from Chengdu Blades)
50	FW	CHN	Wang Pengli (loan return from Shaanxi Laochenggen)
53	MF	CHN	Niu Luyuan (loan return from Shaanxi Laochenggen)
-	MF	CHN	Du Zhenyu (loan return from Tianjin Teda)
-	FW	COL	Yovanny Arrechea (loan return from Hohhot Dongjin)

Out:

No.	Pos.	Nation	Player
1	GK	CHN	Zong Lei (to Tianjin Teda)
5	DF	BRA	Cássio (Released)
8	MF	CHN	Du Zhenyu (to Tianjin Teda)
9	FW	BRA	Weldon (loan return to (Romania) CFR Cluj)
13	GK	CHN	Yi Fan (loan to Lijiang Jiayunhao)
20	MF	CHN	Piao Qianhua (loan to Yanbian Baekdu Tigers)
30	MF	CHN	Qu Xiaohui (to Liaoning Whowin)
33	FW	COL	Edixon Perea (loan to (Colombia) Deportivo Cali)
37	MF	BUL	Marquinhos (to (Bulgaria) Lokomotiv Sofia)
40	FW	COL	John Jairo Mosquera (to (Germany) Energie Cottbus)
42	DF	CHN	Li Hong (loan to Shaanxi Laochenggen)
43	DF	CHN	Mou Yanlong (loan to Shaanxi Laochenggen)
44	FW	CHN	Zhao Haoxiang (loan to Shaanxi Laochenggen)
45	MF	CHN	Mou Yiming (loan to Shaanxi Laochenggen)
46	MF	CHN	Wang Fa (to Liaoning Whowin)
48	MF	CHN	Wang Si (loan to Shaanxi Laochenggen)
-	DF	CHN	Qu Peng (loan to Shaanxi Laochenggen)
-	MF	CHN	Wang Jinliang (loan to Shaanxi Laochenggen)
-	DF	CHN	Pan Ximing (loan to Shaanxi Laochenggen)
-	GK	CHN	Zhou Miao (loan to Shaanxi Laochenggen)
-	MF	CHN	Wu Peng (loan to Shaanxi Laochenggen)
-	FW	COL	Yovanny Arrechea (to (Mexico) Club León)

=== Dalian Aerbin ===
In:

No.	Pos.	Nation	Player
1	GK	CHN	Zhang Chong (from Dalian Shide)
2	DF	CHN	Yang Boyu (from Dalian Shide)
4	DF	CHN	Li Xuepeng (from Dalian Shide)
9	FW	FRA	Guillaume Hoarau (from (France) Paris Saint-Germain)
10	MF	CHN	Chen Tao (from Tianjin Teda)
17	GK	CHN	Zhang Zhenqiang (from Dalian Shide)
23	FW	CHN	Zhao Xuebin (from Dalian Shide)
30	MF	CHN	Sun Guowen (from Dalian Shide)
32	MF	CHN	Eddy François (loan return from Shanghai East Asia)
40	MF	CHN	Yu Hanchao (from Liaoning Whowin)
41	MF	CHN	Yan Xiangchuang (from Dalian Shide)
42	DF	CHN	Zhao Honglüe (from Dalian Shide)
43	FW	CHN	Li Zhichao (from Dalian Shide)
44	MF	CHN	Lü Peng (from Dalian Shide)
45	MF	CHN	Yan Feng (from Dalian Shide)
-	FW	COL	Luis Carlos Cabezas (loan return from Shanghai East Asia)
-	FW	CHN	Nan Yunqi (from Dalian Shide)
-	MF	CHN	Wang Shixin (from Dalian Shide)
-	FW	CHN	Han Jiabao (from Dalian Shide)
-	DF	CHN	Xue Ya'nan (from Dalian Shide)

Out:

No.	Pos.	Nation	Player
1	GK	CHN	Yu Ziqian (loan to Qingdao Hainiu)
7	MF	CHN	Wu Qing (to Chongqing Lifan)
13	DF	GHA	Lee Addy (loan to (Croatia) Dinamo Zagreb)
14	MF	CHN	Hu Zhaojun (to Beijing Baxy)
15	MF	CHN	Yin Lu (to Jiangsu Sainty)
16	DF	AUS	Daniel Mullen (loan to (Australia) Melbourne Victory)
17	DF	CHN	Sun Haosheng (loan to Guizhou Zhicheng)
18	DF	CHN	Wang Meng (Released)
23	GK	CHN	Lei Tao (Released)
26	MF	CHN	Jiang Wenjun (loan to Qingdao Hainiu)
27	DF	CHN	Chang Lin (to Shijiazhuang Yongchang Junhao)
28	DF	CHN	Wang Hongyou (to Hangzhou Greentown)
29	MF	CHN	Sun Bo (to Shijiazhuang Yongchang Junhao)
30	DF	CHN	Yang Lin (to Shijiazhuang Yongchang Junhao)
31	GK	CHN	Zhan Lunhao (to Shandong Tengding)
32	DF	CHN	Lü Zheng (to Shenzhen Ruby)
36	MF	CHN	Li Qi (Released)
38	FW	CHN	Chen Hongquan (to Qinghai Senke)
-	FW	COL	Luis Carlos Cabezas (to Shanghai East Asia)
-	FW	CHN	Nan Yunqi (loan to Shenyang Shenbei)
-	MF	CHN	Wang Shixin (loan to Shenyang Shenbei)
-	FW	CHN	Han Jiabao (loan to Qingdao Hainiu)
-	DF	CHN	Xue Ya'nan (loan to Qingdao Hainiu)

=== Guangzhou Evergrande ===
In:

No.	Pos.	Nation	Player
2	MF	CHN	Liao Lisheng (from Dongguan Nancheng)
3	DF	CHN	Yi Teng (from Shenzhen Ruby)
4	DF	CHN	Zhao Peng (from Henan Jianye)
9	MF	BRA	Elkeson (from (Brazil) Botafogo)
14	MF	CHN	Feng Renliang (from Shanghai Shenhua)
19	GK	CHN	Zeng Cheng (from Henan Jianye)
30	FW	CHN	Yang Chaosheng (from Dongguan Nancheng)
34	MF	CHN	Hu Weiwei (from Dongguan Nancheng)
36	GK	CHN	Fang Jingqi (from Dongguan Nancheng)
-	MF	CHN	Li Yan (loan return from Guangzhou R&F)
-	DF	CHN	Chen Jianlong (loan return from Shanghai Shenxin)
-	DF	CHN	Li Weixin (from Dongguan Nancheng)
-	MF	BRA	Renato Cajá (loan return from (Japan) Kashima Antlers)
-	MF	CHN	Wang Rui (from Dongguan Nancheng)
-	MF	CHN	Zhang Xingbo (from Dongguan Nancheng)

Out:

No.	Pos.	Nation	Player
2	DF	CHN	Tu Dongxu (loan to Meizhou Kejia)
3	DF	BRA	Paulão (loan to (Brazil) Cruzeiro)
9	FW	BRA	Cléo (loan to (Japan) Kashiwa Reysol)
12	GK	CHN	Dong Chunyu (loan to Shenyang Shenbei)
14	DF	CHN	Li Jianhua (to Guangzhou R&F)
16	MF	KOR	Cho Won-Hee (to Wuhan Zall)
17	MF	CHN	Gao Zhilin (loan to Meizhou Kejia)
19	DF	CHN	Li Jianbin (loan to Shanghai Shenhua)
21	FW	CHN	Jiang Ning (to Guangzhou R&F)
26	MF	CHN	Wu Pingfeng (to Guangzhou R&F)
30	MF	CHN	Peng Shaoxiong (loan to Meizhou Kejia)
33	MF	CHN	Li Yan (to Guangzhou R&F)
36	FW	CHN	Gao Shunhang (to Qingdao Jonoon)
38	DF	CHN	Zhang Yujia (loan to Meizhou Kejia)
48	GK	CHN	Zhi Xinhua (Retired)
-	DF	CHN	Chen Jianlong (to Meizhou Kejia)
-	DF	CHN	Li Weixin (loan to Meixian Hakka)
-	MF	BRA	Renato Cajá (loan to (Brazil) Vitória)
-	MF	CHN	Wang Rui (loan to Meixian Hakka)
-	MF	CHN	Zhang Xingbo (loan to Meixian Hakka)

=== Guangzhou R&F ===
In:

No.	Pos.	Nation	Player
5	DF	CHN	Zhang Yaokun (from Dalian Shide)
7	FW	CHN	Jiang Ning (from Guangzhou Evergrande)
14	FW	CHN	Li Jianhua (from Guangzhou Evergrande)
26	MF	CHN	Wu Pingfeng (from Guangzhou Evergrande)
33	MF	CHN	Li Yan (from Guangzhou Evergrande)
37	MF	CHN	Feng Zhuoyi (from Chengdu Blades)
41	FW	CHN	Chang Feiya (from Guangdong Youth)
42	DF	CHN	Wang Xinhui (from Guangdong Youth)
43	GK	CHN	Pei Chensong (from Liaoning Whowin)
45	DF	CHN	Zhang Chenlong (from Dongguan Nancheng)
46	DF	CHN	Xiao Zhilei (from Dongguan Nancheng)

Out:

No.	Pos.	Nation	Player
2	DF	CHN	Sui Donglu (to Chongqing Lifan)
33	MF	CHN	Li Yan (loan return to Guangzhou Evergrande)
38	FW	CHN	Wen Shuo (to Lijiang Jiayunhao)

=== Guizhou Renhe ===
In:

No.	Pos.	Nation	Player
4	MF	AUS	Jonas Salley (from Shanghai Shenxin)
6	MF	CHN	Fan Yunlong (from Guizhou Zhicheng)
10	MF	BIH	Zvjezdan Misimović (from (Russia) FC Dynamo Moscow)
13	FW	CHN	Shi Liang (from Guangdong Sunray Cave)
20	FW	CHN	Chen Zijie (loan return from Shanghai East Asia)
23	DF	TPE	Xavier Chen (from (Belgium) KV Mechelen)
37	DF	CHN	Yu Rui (from Tianjin Songjiang)
51	FW	CHN	Xu Li'ao (loan return from Shaanxi Laochenggen)
-	MF	CHN	Li Shuai (loan return from (Portugal) Porto)
-	MF	CHN	Wang Erzhuo (loan return from Shaanxi Laochenggen)
-	FW	CHN	Zhang Chengxiang (loan return from Shaanxi Laochenggen)
-	MF	CHN	Yang Feng (loan return from Shaanxi Laochenggen)

Out:

No.	Pos.	Nation	Player
6	DF	AUS	Dino Djulbic (to (United Arab Emirates) Al-Wahda)
10	MF	ESP	Rubén Suárez (to (Spain) UD Almería)
13	MF	CHN	Wang Erzhuo (to Chengdu Blades)
18	FW	CHN	Shen Tianfeng (loan to Shaanxi Laochenggen)
23	GK	CHN	Xu Jiamin (loan to Shanghai Youth U20)
24	MF	CHN	Yang Lei (loan to Shaanxi Laochenggen)
28	DF	CHN	Dong Yang (Released)
30	DF	CHN	Liu Qing (loan to Qingdao Hainiu)
32	DF	CHN	Gao Zhenzhe (Released)
33	MF	CHN	Guo Sheng (loan to Shaanxi Laochenggen)
38	FW	CHN	Zhang Chengxiang (loan to Shaanxi Laochenggen)
-	MF	CHN	Yang Feng (loan to (Brazil) Lajeadense)
-	MF	CHN	Li Shuai (loan to Shaanxi Laochenggen)

=== Hangzhou Greentown ===
In:

No.	Pos.	Nation	Player
2	DF	CHN	Song Zhiwei (from Chongqing F.C.)
6	FW	CHN	Gao Di (loan from Shandong Luneng)
9	FW	BRA	Mazola (loan from (Brazil) São Paulo)
10	MF	CZE	Marek Jarolím (from (Czech Republic) FK Teplice)
11	FW	JPN	Masashi Oguro (loan from (Japan) Yokohama F. Marinos)
12	FW	CHN	Wang Xiao (from Shenzhen Ruby)
20	FW	CIV	Davy Claude Angan (from (Norway) Molde FK)
22	DF	CHN	Wang Lin (from Shanghai Shenhua)
23	FW	CHN	Huang Fengtao (from Shenzhen Ruby)
27	DF	CHN	Wang Hongyou (from Dalian Aerbin)
30	GK	CHN	Teng Shangkun (loan return from Chongqing F.C.)
32	GK	CHN	Huang Yuandong (loan return from Shenzhen Main Sports)
-	FW	CHN	Yu Haoxin (loan return from Shenzhen Main Sports)
-	FW	CHN	Tan Yang (loan return from Hebei Zhongji)
-	FW	CHN	Cai Chuchuan (loan return from Shaanxi Daqin)

Out:

No.	Pos.	Nation	Player
1	GK	CHN	Han Feng (to Henan Jianye)
2	DF	KOR	Jeong Dong-Ho (loan return to (Japan) Yokohama F. Marinos)
9	FW	BRA	Mazola (loan return to (Brazil) São Paulo)
10	FW	BRA	Renatinho (loan return to (Uruguay) C.A. Rentistas)
11	MF	BRA	Fabrício (loan return to (Portugal) Portimonense)
12	FW	CHN	Cai Chuchuan (to Tianjin Songjiang)
15	DF	CHN	Sun Ji (Retired)
18	DF	CHN	Zheng Kewei (Released)
20	FW	CHN	Bari Mamatil (to Jiangsu Sainty)
30	FW	CHN	Zeng Yue (Released)
31	MF	CHN	Yang Chen (Released)
32	DF	CHN	Wu Yuyin (to Shanghai East Asia)
-	FW	CHN	Tan Yang (to Hebei Zhongji)

=== Jiangsu Sainty ===
In:

No.	Pos.	Nation	Player
7	FW	CHN	Bari Mamatil (from Hangzhou Greentown)
11	FW	ALB	Hamdi Salihi (from (United States) D.C. United)
22	DF	CHN	Wu Xi (from Shanghai Shenhua)
30	MF	CHN	Yin Lu (from Dalian Aerbin)
37	GK	CHN	Jiang Hao (from Dalian Shide)
-	MF	CHN	Liu Qing (loan return from Qinghai Senke)

Out:

No.	Pos.	Nation	Player
2	MF	CHN	Cao Rui (Retired)
11	FW	CHN	Wang Yunlong (to Wuhan Zall)
14	MF	CHN	Tang Miao (loan to Shenzhen Fengpeng)
30	FW	CHN	Li Zhenhuan (Released)
32	GK	CHN	Liu Jun (to Qingdao Hainiu)
36	MF	CHN	Sun Xiang (loan to Qingdao Hainiu)
40	FW	CHN	Du Wenhui (Released)
-	MF	CHN	Liu Qing (loan to Hunan Billows)

=== Liaoning Whowin ===
In:

No.	Pos.	Nation	Player
2	DF	UZB	Shavkat Mullajanov (from (Saudi Arabia) Al Nassr)
4	MF	CHN	Sun Shilin (from Shijiazhuang Yongchang Junhao)
10	FW	BRA	Edu (from (Germany) Schalke 04)
12	FW	ZAM	James Chamanga (from Dalian Shide)
18	MF	CHN	Wang Liang (from Dalian Shide)
21	MF	CHN	Qu Xiaohui (from Changchun Yatai)
26	GK	CHN	Zhu Zilin (loan return from Hubei China-Kyle)
30	MF	CHN	Ni Yusong (from Dalian Shide)
33	MF	CHN	Wang Fa (from Changchun Yatai)

Out:

No.	Pos.	Nation	Player
10	MF	MKD	Vlatko Grozdanoski (to (Iran) Persepolis)
12	GK	CHN	Cui Kai (to Chongqing F.C.)
17	DF	CHN	Han Xuegeng (loan to Lijiang Jiayunhao)
18	FW	CHN	Yang Xu (to Shandong Luneng)
20	MF	CHN	Yu Hanchao (to Dalian Aerbin)
21	MF	CHN	Zhang Xiaoyu (to Lijiang Jiayunhao)
31	FW	CHN	Ji Chao (loan to Qingdao Hainiu)
32	DF	CHN	Song Chen (to Qinghai Senke)
40	DF	KOR	Kim Yoo-Jin (to (Thailand) Muangthong United)
53	GK	CHN	Pei Chensong (to Guangzhou R&F)
56	MF	CHN	Huang Lie (to Hohhot Dongjin)

=== Qingdao Jonoon ===
In:

No.	Pos.	Nation	Player
3	DF	CHN	Zheng Jianfeng (from Dalian Shide)
4	DF	BRA	Gustavo (from (Brazil) Portuguesa)
6	MF	UZB	Sherzod Karimov (loan from (Uzbekistan) Pakhtakor Tashkent)
11	FW	SYR	George Mourad (from (Sweden) Syrianska FC)
13	MF	CHN	Quan Lei (from Dalian Shide)
18	DF	CHN	Jiao Zhe (from Shandong Luneng)
27	MF	CHN	Ma Leilei (from Tianjin Teda)
42	MF	CHN	Liu Haonan (loan return from Shandong Youth)
44	DF	CHN	Yan Tengfei (loan return from Sichuan FC)
45	FW	CHN	Gao Shunhang (from Guangzhou Evergrande)
-	MF	CHN	Zhang Fengyu (loan return from Hebei Zhongji)

Out:

No.	Pos.	Nation	Player
3	DF	BRA	Léo San (Released)
6	FW	UZB	Aziz Ibrahimov (to (Czech Republic) FK Baník Most)
12	MF	CHN	Pan Yuchen (Released)
14	DF	CHN	Wei Renjie (to Shandong Tengding)
16	MF	CHN	Feng Tao (Released)
18	MF	CHN	Xing Dong (Released)
27	DF	CHN	Liu Yangyang (Released)
34	MF	CHN	Pang Zhiquan (Released)
35	DF	CHN	Gong Yaotong (Released)
49	FW	CHN	Ye Qian (to Dali Ruilong)
-	MF	CHN	Zhang Fengyu (to Shandong Tengding)

=== Shandong Luneng ===
In:

No.	Pos.	Nation	Player
4	DF	AUS	Ryan McGowan (from (Scotland) Heart of Midlothian)
23	DF	CHN	Zhao Mingjian (from Dalian Shide)
30	FW	ROU	Marius Niculae (from (Romania) FC Vaslui)
33	MF	CHN	Jin Jingdao (from Shenyang Shenbei)
39	FW	CHN	Yang Xu (from Liaoning Whowin)
-	FW	CHN	Yu Shuai (loan return from Beijing Yitong Kuche)
-	DF	CHN	Jiao Zhe (loan return from Beijing Guoan)
-	FW	BRA	Obina (loan return from (Brazil) Palmeiras)

Out:

No.	Pos.	Nation	Player
13	FW	CHN	Gao Di (loan to Hangzhou Greentown)
23	MF	CHN	Li Wei (loan to Wuhan Zall)
31	MF	MOZ	Simão (to (Spain) Levante UD)
33	FW	PAR	José Ortigoza (to (Japan) Ventforet Kofu)
-	FW	BRA	Obina (loan to (Brazil) Bahia)
-	DF	CHN	Jiao Zhe (to Qingdao Jonoon)
-	FW	CHN	Yu Shuai (to Shenzhen Ruby)

=== Shanghai SIPG ===
In:

No.	Pos.	Nation	Player
3	DF	CHN	Wu Yuyin (from Hangzhou Greentown)
8	FW	GHA	Chris Dickson (from (Cyprus) AEL Limassol)
9	FW	COL	Luis Carlos Cabezas (from Dalian Aerbin)
13	MF	CHN	Zheng Dalun (from Shanghai Zobon)
15	FW	CHN	Lin Chuangyi (from Shanghai Zobon)
17	MF	CHN	Ji Xiaoxuan (from Shanghai Zobon)
19	FW	CHN	Li Shenglong (from Shanghai Zobon)
21	DF	ESP	Ibán Cuadrado (Free Agent)
24	GK	CHN	Dong Jialin (from Shanghai Zobon)
26	MF	CHN	Wu Yizhen (from Shanghai Zobon)
27	DF	CHN	Hu Bowen (from Shanghai Zobon)
41	DF	CHN	He Guan (from Shanghai Zobon)
42	MF	CHN	Yang Shiyuan (from Shanghai Zobon)
43	MF	CHN	Li Tianchen (from Shanghai Zobon)
44	DF	CHN	Yang Guiyan (from Shanghai Zobon)
45	DF	CHN	Zhang Yi (from Shanghai Zobon)
46	DF	CHN	Zhang Wei (from Shanghai Zobon)
47	MF	CHN	Li Jiawei (from Shanghai Zobon)
48	FW	CHN	Li Haowen (from Shanghai Zobon)
49	DF	CHN	Zhang Wentao (from Shanghai Zobon)
50	DF	CHN	Sun Yashu (from Shanghai Zobon)
51	MF	CHN	Hao Shuai (from Shanghai Zobon)
52	DF	CHN	Wu Haitian (from Shanghai Zobon)
53	MF	CHN	Yun Zhihai (from Shanghai Zobon)
-	DF	CHN	Bai Jiajun (loan return from Shanghai Shenhua)

Out:

No.	Pos.	Nation	Player
8	FW	CHN	Zhan Yilin (to Shanghai Shenhua)
9	FW	COL	Luis Cabezas (loan return to Dalian Aerbin)
10	FW	CHN	Chen Zijie (loan return to Guizhou Renhe)
15	DF	CHN	Li Cheng (Retired)
19	MF	HON	Samir Arzú (loan return to (Honduras) C.D. Victoria)
21	MF	CHN	Ding Quancheng (Released)
23	DF	CHN	Bai Jiajun (to Shanghai Shenhua)
24	GK	CHN	Mao Rongjun (Retired)
26	MF	CHN	Eddy François (loan return to Dalian Aerbin)
27	FW	CHN	Xian Xiaolong (Released)
33	DF	BRA	Bruno Camacho (to (Brazil) União Barbarense)
48	DF	CHN	Xian Haichao (to Meizhou Kejia)

=== Shanghai Shenhua ===
In:

No.	Pos.	Nation	Player
2	DF	ARG	Rolando Schiavi (from (Argentina) Boca Juniors)
4	DF	CHN	Li Jianbin (loan from Guangzhou Evergrande)
7	MF	CHN	Wang Changqing (from Beijing Guoan)
9	FW	CPV	Dady (from (Cyprus) Apollon Limassol)
11	FW	SYR	Firas Al-Khatib (from (Iraq) Zakho)
12	DF	CHN	Bai Jiajun (from Shanghai East Asia)
15	FW	CHN	Zhan Yilin (from Shanghai East Asia)
20	MF	CHN	Xu Liang (from Beijing Guoan)
27	MF	ARG	Patricio Toranzo (from (Argentina) Racing Club)
29	MF	CHN	Wang Zhenyu (Free Agent)
34	GK	CHN	Dong Hang (from Qinghai Senke)
45	MF	CHN	Yang Yufan (from Shenzhen Main Sports)

Out:

No.	Pos.	Nation	Player
3	DF	BRA	Moisés (to (Brazil) Portuguesa)
4	DF	CHN	Wang Lin (to Hangzhou Greentown)
6	MF	CHN	Yu Tao (to Shanghai Shenxin)
7	MF	CHN	Feng Renliang (to Guangzhou Evergrande)
11	FW	CIV	Didier Drogba (to (Turkey) Galatasaray)
12	DF	CHN	Bai Jiajun (loan return to Shanghai East Asia)
13	DF	CHN	Cheng Liang (Retired)
15	MF	CHN	Fei Yu (to (Poland) Warta Poznań)
17	MF	CHN	Fan Lingjiang (loan to Jiangxi Liansheng)
20	DF	CHN	Wu Xi (to Jiangsu Sainty)
21	MF	CHN	Wang Guanyi (to Tianjin Teda)
23	DF	CHN	Qiu Tianyi (to Wuhan Zall)
24	MF	CHN	Wang Yang (Released)
27	MF	CHN	Liu Junnan (to Shanghai Shenxin)
29	FW	AUS	Joel Griffiths (to (Australia) Sydney FC)
31	MF	CHN	You Yuanwen (to Qingdao Hainiu)
32	DF	CHN	Gu Bin (loan to Chongqing F.C.)
38	MF	CHN	Wang Hongliang (loan return to Chongqing Lifan)
39	FW	FRA	Nicolas Anelka (to (Italy) Juventus)
46	FW	CHN	Xu Qi (loan to Jiangxi Liansheng)

=== Shanghai Shenxin ===
In:

No.	Pos.	Nation	Player
6	DF	AUS	Michael Marrone (from (Australia) Melbourne Heart)
16	MF	CHN	Yu Tao (from Shanghai Shenhua)
18	DF	CHN	Ge Zhen (from Guangdong Sunray Cave)
19	FW	BRA	Kieza (from (Brazil) Náutico)
21	MF	CHN	Liu Junnan (from Shanghai Shenhua)
38	GK	CHN	Li Yangxin (from Shanghai Zobon)
-	MF	CHN	Lin Pei (loan return from Shaanxi Daqin)
-	DF	CHN	Wang Jian (loan return from Jiangxi Liansheng)

Out:

No.	Pos.	Nation	Player
2	MF	CHN	Li Lei (to Henan Jianye)
5	MF	CHN	Wang Bo (loan to Hubei China-Kyle)
10	FW	BRA	Anselmo (to (Brazil) Ceará)
19	FW	CHN	Ji Jun (to Meizhou Kejia)
23	DF	CHN	Chen Jianlong (loan return to Guangzhou Evergrande)
29	MF	AUS	Jonas Salley (to Guizhou Renhe)
30	DF	CHN	Yang Chen (to Hebei Zhongji)
36	GK	CHN	Zhang Zhenqiang (loan return to Dalian Shide)
-	MF	CHN	Lin Pei (to Meizhou Kejia)
-	DF	CHN	Wang Jian (to Qingdao Hainiu)

=== Tianjin Teda ===
In:

No.	Pos.	Nation	Player
1	GK	CHN	Zong Lei (from Changchun Yatai)
3	DF	BRA	Éder Lima (from (Brazil) Oeste)
4	MF	CHN	Wang Guanyi (from Shanghai Shenhua)
6	MF	CHN	Du Zhenyu (from Changchun Yatai)
9	MF	BRA	Dinélson (from (Brazil) Avaí)
11	FW	COL	Carmelo Valencia (from (Colombia) La Equidad)
16	MF	AUS	Erik Paartalu (from (Australia) Brisbane Roar)
30	MF	CHN	Lü Wei (loan return from Hohhot Dongjin)
31	MF	SRB	Vladimir Jovančić (from (South Korea) Seongnam Ilhwa Chunma)
33	DF	CHN	Cai Xi (from Wuhan Zall)
-	MF	CHN	Li Yaoyue (loan return from Tianjin Songjiang)
-	MF	CHN	Bai Yuexuan (loan return from Hunan Billows)
-	DF	CHN	Jia Yudong (loan return from Hebei Zhongji)
-	FW	CHN	Fan Baiqun (loan return from Shenyang Shenbei)
-	DF	CHN	Mao Kaiyu (loan return from Hohhot Dongjin)

Out:

No.	Pos.	Nation	Player
1	GK	CHN	Song Zhenyu (to Changchun Yatai)
4	DF	AUS	Milan Susak (to (Iran) Sepahan F.C.)
6	DF	ROU	Lucian Goian (to Beijing Baxy)
11	FW	CHN	Jiang Chen (Released)
12	GK	CHN	Tian Xu (Released)
21	MF	CHN	Chen Tao (to Dalian Aerbin)
27	MF	CHN	Ma Leilei (to Qingdao Jonoon)
28	FW	NED	Sjoerd Ars (loan return to (Bulgaria) PFC Levski Sofia)
29	MF	MKD	Veliče Šumulikoski (to (Czech Republic) 1. FC Slovácko)
30	GK	CHN	Zhao Yanming (to Tianjin Songjiang)
31	MF	SRB	Vladimir Jovančić (loan return to (South Korea) Seongnam Ilhwa Chunma)
35	MF	CHN	Du Zhenyu (loan return to Changchun Yatai)
40	FW	CHN	Du Junpeng (loan to Tianjin Songjiang)
41	MF	CHN	Zhao Yingjie (loan to Dali Ruilong)
58	MF	CHN	Liu Song (to Tianjin Songjiang)
-	FW	CHN	Fan Baiqun (loan to Tianjin Songjiang)
-	DF	CHN	Mao Kaiyu (loan to Shenyang Shenbei)
-	MF	CHN	Li Yaoyue (loan to Qingdao Hainiu)
-	DF	CHN	Jia Yudong (to Hebei Zhongji)
-	MF	CHN	Bai Yuexuan (Released)

=== Wuhan Zall ===
In:

No.	Pos.	Nation	Player
2	DF	CHN	Liu Shangkun (from Tianjin Songjiang)
3	DF	CHN	Qiu Tianyi (from Shanghai Shenhua)
4	DF	SRB	Novak Martinović (from (Romania) Steaua București)
6	MF	KOR	Cho Won-Hee (from Guangzhou Evergrande)
9	FW	CHN	Wang Yunlong (from Jiangsu Sainty)
10	FW	BRA	Santos (from (South Korea) Jeju United)
11	DF	CHN	Zhu Ting (from Dalian Shide)
13	MF	CHN	Jin Xin (loan return from Hubei China-Kyle)
14	FW	NGA	Bentley (from (Norway) Brann)
17	MF	CHN	Li Wei (loan from Shandong Luneng)
22	GK	CHN	Sun Shoubo (from Dalian Shide)
29	FW	MLI	Garra Dembélé (loan from (Germany) SC Freiburg)
-	DF	CHN	Song Xie (loan return from Hubei China-Kyle)
-	MF	CHN	Zhou Yi (loan return from Hubei China-Kyle)
-	MF	CHN	Sang Yifei (loan return from Beijing Technology)

Out:

No.	Pos.	Nation	Player
2	DF	CHN	Wang Xiaoshi (Retired)
3	DF	CHN	Cai Xi (to Tianjin Teda)
6	MF	URU	Julio Gutiérrez (to (Uruguay) Defensor Sporting)
10	FW	BRA	Vicente (to Hubei China-Kyle)
11	MF	BRA	Adiel (to Hubei China-Kyle)
14	MF	CHN	Hu Xi (loan to Jiangxi Liansheng)
17	GK	CHN	Zhu Zisen (to Hubei China-Kyle)
20	MF	CHN	Rao Yao (to Jiangxi Liansheng)
21	DF	CHN	Wang Peng (to Hebei Zhongji)
22	MF	CHN	Du Fa (loan to Jiangxi Liansheng)
29	DF	CHN	Xia Tian (Released)
31	FW	CHN	Liu Shun (loan to Hubei Youth(U20))
33	MF	CHN	Sang Yifei (to Beijing Technology)
36	FW	COL	Carlos Ceballos (to (Colombia) América)
-	MF	CHN	Zhou Yi (to Hubei China-Kyle)
-	DF	CHN	Song Xie (to Hubei China-Kyle)

== League One ==
=== Beijing Baxy ===
In:

No.	Pos.	Nation	Player
5	DF	ROU	Lucian Goian (from Tianjin Teda)
6	MF	CHN	Hu Zhaojun (from Dalian Aerbin)
8	MF	CHN	Lu Jiang (from Beijing Guoan)
10	FW	SVN	Tomislav Mišura (from (Slovenia) NK Krka)
14	FW	TPE	Wen Chih-hao (from (Chinese Taipei) Taipower FC)
15	DF	CHN	Cui Wei (Free Agent)
16	DF	TPE	Lin Yueh-han (from (Chinese Taipei) NTCPE FC)
23	FW	AUS	Ryan Griffiths (from (Australia) Newcastle Jets)
25	MF	CHN	WZhang Sheng (from Beijing Youth)
31	FW	CHN	Hu Qiling (from Beijing Guoan)
32	DF	CHN	Wang Cun (from Chengdu Blades)

Out:

No.	Pos.	Nation	Player
4	MF	GHA	Daniel Quaye (Released)
5	DF	CHN	Xu Ning (to Meizhou Kejia)
9	FW	BRA	Júnior Paulista (Released)
11	MF	CHN	Liu Xiang (to Meizhou Kejia)
14	MF	KOR	Shin Eun-Seok (Released)
15	MF	CHN	Zhang Yong (to Guangdong Sunray Cave)
16	MF	CHN	Li Zhichao (loan return to Dalian Shide)
27	MF	CHN	Yao Shuang (Released)
32	FW	SEN	Momar N'Diaye (Released)

=== Beijing Technology ===
In:

No.	Pos.	Nation	Player
3	MF	CHN	Li Xiangbin (loan from Chongqing Lifan)
10	MF	CHN	Sang Yifei (from Wuhan Zall)
12	FW	URU	Danilo Peinado (from (Uruguay) Bella Vista)
20	DF	URU	Abel Nazario (from (Uruguay) Cerro Largo)
24	DF	CHN	Du Wenxiang (loan from Chongqing Lifan)
31	GK	CHN	Li Shi (from Hunan Billows)

Out:

No.	Pos.	Nation	Player
3	DF	KOR	Lee In-Shik (Released)
10	FW	URU	Matías Alonso (to (Uruguay) Juventud)
12	MF	CHN	Liu Meng (Released)
16	MF	CHN	Zhuang Dayu (Released)
20	MF	CHN	Wu Fanghu (Released)
24	DF	CHN	Yang Yang (Released)
27	DF	CHN	Li Jianfeng (Released)
28	DF	CHN	Lu Yushuo (Released)
31	GK	CHN	Sun Cheng (Released)
33	MF	CHN	Li Dongyang (Released)
34	DF	CHN	Sun Yimeng (Released)
36	MF	CHN	Sang Yifei (loan return to Wuhan Zall)
37	FW	URU	Walter Guglielmone (Released)
39	GK	CHN	Bi Yifei (Released)

=== Chengdu Blades ===
In:

No.	Pos.	Nation	Player
2	DF	EST	Raio Piiroja (from (Estonia) FC Flora)
8	MF	CHN	Wu Bo (from Tianjin Songjiang)
9	FW	BUL	Gerasim Zakov (from (Bulgaria) Litex Lovech)
10	FW	SVN	Aleksandar Rodić (from Tianjin Songjiang)
13	MF	CHN	Wang Erzhuo (from Guizhou Renhe)
14	DF	CHN	Song Yueming (from Shenzhen Main Sports)
25	FW	CHN	Yang Wenfeng (Free Agent)
33	MF	CHN	Xue Chen (from Tianjin Songjiang)

Out:

No.	Pos.	Nation	Player
2	DF	CHN	Feng Zhuoyi (to Guangzhou R&F)
10	FW	BRA	Valdo (Released)
16	DF	CHN	Wang Cun (to Beijing Baxy)
20	FW	ANG	Johnson Macaba (Released)
23	FW	CHN	Yang He (loan return to Changchun Yatai)
25	MF	CHN	Erxat Umarjan (to Guizhou Zhicheng)
28	DF	CHN	Fan Peipei (to Chongqing Lifan)
31	MF	CHN	Dai Kunpeng (to Qinghai Senke)
33	DF	BRA	João Paulo (Released)
36	DF	BRA	Willian (Released)
38	GK	CHN	Mu Xiaochen (to Qinghai Senke)

=== Chongqing F.C. ===
In:

No.	Pos.	Nation	Player
4	MF	KOR	Kim Tae-Min (from (South Korea) Gangwon FC)
21	GK	CHN	Cui Kai (from Liaoning Whowin)
22	DF	CRO	Stipe Lapić (from Yanbian Baekdu Tigers)
24	MF	CHN	Han Hao (from Yanbian Baekdu Tigers)
25	DF	CHN	Fan Qunxiao (from Guangdong Sunray Cave)
26	MF	CHN	Gu Bin (loan from Shanghai Shenhua)
30	DF	CHN	Zhao Xudong (from Shenyang Shenbei)

Out:

No.	Pos.	Nation	Player
3	DF	CHN	Song Zhiwei (to Hangzhou Greentown)
4	DF	COL	Rafael Enrique Pérez (to (Colombia) Independiente Medellín)
6	DF	CHN	Yan Shipeng (to Changchun Yatai)
12	DF	CHN	Wang Sheng (Released)
15	FW	HON	Walter Martínez (to (United States) San Jose Earthquakes)
16	DF	CHN	Cui Qi (to Guizhou Zhicheng)
28	MF	CHN	Zhang Gen (to Hebei Zhongji)
30	GK	CHN	Teng Shangkun (loan return to Hangzhou Greentown)

=== Chongqing Lifan ===
In:

No.	Pos.	Nation	Player
5	DF	CHN	Sui Donglu (from Guangzhou R&F)
8	MF	CHN	Cheng Mouyi (from Shijiazhuang Yongchang Junhao)
11	MF	CHN	Wu Qing (from Dalian Aerbin)
15	DF	CMR	Yves Ekwalla Herman (from (Thailand) Buriram United)
22	MF	CHN	Cui Yongzhe (from Yanbian Baekdu Tigers)
28	DF	CHN	Fan Peipei (from Chengdu Blades)
-	MF	CHN	Wang Hongliang (loan return from Shanghai Shenhua)

Out:

No.	Pos.	Nation	Player
4	DF	PAR	Nelson Cabrera (to (Bolivia) Club Bolívar)
5	MF	CHN	Zhao Kun (to Lijiang Jiayunhao)
8	MF	CHN	Wang Hongliang (to Shenzhen Ruby)
11	FW	CHN	Wang Xuanhong (Released)
12	FW	CHN	Zhang Zhaohui (to Qinghai Senke)
14	MF	CHN	Liu Zhenwei (Retired)
15	FW	BRA	Nei (to (Brazil) Grêmio Anápolis)
19	DF	CHN	Liu Zhongyi (Released)
22	MF	CHN	Li Xiangbin (loan to Beijing Technology)
24	MF	CHN	Ding Bo (Released)
28	DF	CHN	He Suyang (to Lijiang Jiayunhao)
31	DF	CHN	Du Wenxiang (loan to Beijing Technology)

=== Guangdong Sunray Cave ===
In:

No.	Pos.	Nation	Player
2	DF	CHN	Su Jingyu (from Hebei Zhongji)
5	DF	URU	Carlos García (from (Uruguay) Racing Club Montevideo)
6	DF	CHN	Li Zhihai (from (Macau) Chao Pak Kei)
8	MF	CHN	Wang Qiang (from Tianjin Songjiang)
12	GK	CHN	Pan Weiming (Free Agent)
18	MF	CHN	Zhang Yong (from Beijing Baxy)
19	MF	CHN	Xiao Yifeng (loan return from (Hong Kong) Sun Pegasus FC)
25	MF	CHN	Yang Jian (from Shenzhen Fengpeng)
26	DF	CHN	Liu Tao (from Tianjin Songjiang)
29	DF	CHN	Le Zheng (from Shenzhen Fengpeng)
31	DF	CHN	Li Zhihui (from Guangdong Youth)
33	FW	CHN	Cai Jingyuan (Free Agent)
41	DF	CHN	Liao Xingyu (from Shenzhen Main Sports)
42	DF	CHN	Tu Xiaolang (from Shenzhen Main Sports)

Out:

No.	Pos.	Nation	Player
1	GK	CHN	Li Weijun (to Meizhou Kejia)
2	DF	BRA	Jean (Released)
6	DF	CHN	Ge Zhen (to Shanghai Shenxin)
8	FW	CHN	Huang Long (Released)
10	FW	BRA	Reinaldo (to (Brazil) Paraná)
11	FW	CHN	Cong Tianhao (Released)
12	DF	CHN	Fan Qunxiao (to Chongqing F.C.)
13	FW	CHN	Shi Liang (to Guizhou Renhe)
14	MF	CHN	Tan Binliang (to (Sweden) Jönköpings Södra IF)
18	MF	CHN	Yin Hongbo (to Henan Jianye)
25	DF	CHN	Pan Jia (to Meizhou Kejia)
31	DF	CHN	Li Zhihai (to (Macau) Chao Pak Kei)
32	GK	CHN	Hou Yu (to Meizhou Kejia)

=== Guizhou Zhicheng ===
In:

No.	Pos.	Nation	Player
2	DF	CHN	Jiang Hongquan (from Yanbian Baekdu Tigers)
4	DF	CAN	Mason Trafford (from (Finland) IFK Mariehamn)
6	MF	CHN	Wu Xiaoli (from (Thailand) Rangsit)
7	MF	KOR	Lee Kil-Hoon (from Hohhot Dongjin)
15	DF	CHN	Hao Qiang (from Shenyang Shenbei)
18	DF	CHN	Sun Haosheng (loan from Dalian Aerbin)
22	DF	CHN	Cui Qi (from Chongqing F.C.)
27	MF	CHN	Ablet Abduraxman (Free Agent)
28	MF	CHN	Erxat Umarjan (from Chengdu Blades)
30	FW	BIH	Ivan Božić (from Yanbian Baekdu Tigers)

Out:

No.	Pos.	Nation	Player
6	MF	CHN	Fan Yunlong (to Guizhou Renhe)
7	MF	CHN	Chen Mao (Released)
18	MF	CHN	Wang Xiaolong (to Lijiang Jiayunhao)
25	FW	CHN	Qu Shaoyan (to Jiangxi Liansheng)
26	FW	CHN	Lian Chen (loan return to Tianjin Songjiang)
27	DF	CHN	Sun Xiaokun (Released)
28	GK	CHN	Wu Yake (loan return to Changchun Yatai)
30	FW	CHN	Wang Xiao (loan return to Shenzhen Ruby)
31	DF	CHN	Zhang Yang (Released)

=== Harbin Yiteng ===
In:

No.	Pos.	Nation	Player
1	GK	CHN	Guo Chunquan (from Tianjin Songjiang)
15	MF	CHN	Ma Tianming (loan return from Shanxi Jiayi)
19	MF	CHN	Yang Baoming (from Hunan Billows)
27	DF	CHN	Li Jian (from Hohhot Dongjin)
31	MF	CHN	Li Gen (from Hohhot Dongjin)
32	GK	CHN	Lai Xiaoyu (from Shanxi Daqin)
35	MF	CHN	Zhan Feihu (Free Agent)
-	FW	CHN	Shi Jun (loan return from Qinghai Senke)
-	MF	CHN	Xian Tao (loan return from Hebei Zhongji)
-	FW	CHN	Wu Dingmao (loan return from Shanxi Jiayi)

Out:

No.	Pos.	Nation	Player
1	GK	CHN	Zang Yongliang (Released)
4	DF	CHN	Xing Xufei (to Lijiang Jiayunhao)
11	FW	CHN	Deng Li (to Lijiang Jiayunhao)
18	DF	CHN	Li Xiaoting (to Changchun Yatai)
19	FW	CHN	Zhang Shuoke (to Lijiang Jiayunhao)
23	MF	CHN	Yin Liangyi (to Shijiazhuang Yongchang Junhao)
33	FW	CHN	Shi Jun (to Qinghai Senke)
35	FW	AUS	Million Butshiire (Released)
-	MF	CHN	Xian Tao (loan to Hebei Zhongji)
-	FW	CHN	Wu Dingmao (to Hebei Zhongji)
-	FW	CHN	Ren Jianglong (to Meizhou Kejia)

=== Henan Jianye ===
In:

No.	Pos.	Nation	Player
2	DF	CHN	Li Lei (from Shanghai Shenxin)
3	DF	SLE	Gibril Sankoh (from (Germany) FC Augsburg)
9	FW	COD	Joël Tshibamba (from (Greece) AEL)
19	MF	CHN	Yin Hongbo (from Guangdong Sunray Cave)
22	MF	CHN	Zhu Yifan (loan from Beijing Guoan)
29	GK	CHN	Han Feng (from Hangzhou Greentown)
34	GK	CHN	Dang Zhao (from Shenzhen Main Sports)
-	MF	CHN	Cao Bin (loan return from Jiangxi Liansheng)

Out:

No.	Pos.	Nation	Player
2	DF	KOR	Son Seung-Joon (Released)
3	MF	CHN	Yao Bing (Retired)
4	DF	CHN	Zhao Peng (to Guangzhou Evergrande)
9	FW	BRA	Leandro Netto (to Hunan Billows)
19	GK	CHN	Zeng Cheng (to Guangzhou Evergrande)
22	MF	CHN	Zi Long (to Hebei Zhongji)
24	MF	CHN	Wang Haozhi (loan to Hebei Zhongji)
26	GK	CHN	Liu Ziqian (to Qinghai Senke)
31	MF	ZAM	Isaac Chansa (Released)
32	MF	CHN	Du Jinlong (to Shandong Tengding)
34	DF	BRA	Adaílton (to (Switzerland) FC Sion)
47	MF	CHN	Yu Yang (to Shandong Tengding)
51	DF	CHN	Lu Yao (to Shandong Tengding)
52	MF	CHN	Cao Bin (to Jiangxi Liansheng)

=== Hubei China-Kyle ===
In:

No.	Pos.	Nation	Player
5	MF	CHN	Zhou Yi (from Wuhan Zall)
6	MF	CHN	Wang Bo (loan from Shanghai Shenxin)
9	FW	BRA	Vicente (from Wuhan Zall)
11	MF	BRA	Adiel (from Wuhan Zall)
12	GK	CHN	Zhu Zisen (from Wuhan Zall)
14	MF	CHN	Xing Kai (from Shenzhen Main Sports)
20	DF	CHN	Song Xie (from Wuhan Zall)
24	DF	HON	Quiarol Arzú (from (Honduras) C.D. Marathón)

Out:

No.	Pos.	Nation	Player
1	GK	CHN	Zhu Zilin (loan return to Liaoning Whowin)
5	MF	CHN	Zhou Yi (loan return to Wuhan Zall)
6	MF	CHN	Hu Hao (loan return to Hunan Billows)
13	MF	CHN	Wang Quan (to Hebei Zhongji)
14	MF	CHN	Jin Xin (loan return to Wuhan Zall)
24	MF	CHN	Cui Wengjun (Released)
25	DF	CHN	Song Xie (loan return to Wuhan Zall)
27	DF	CHN	Liu Bo (loan return to Hunan Billows)

=== Hunan Billows ===
In:

No.	Pos.	Nation	Player
2	MF	CHN	Liu Qing (loan from Jiangsu Sainty)
3	DF	CHN	Liu Bo (loan return from Hubei China-Kyle)
5	DF	EST	Taavi Rähn (from Tianjin Songjiang)
9	FW	BRA	Leandro Netto (from Henan Jianye)
10	MF	CRO	Srebrenko Posavec (Free Agent)
12	GK	CHN	Dong Jianhong (loan return from Qinghai Senke)
27	MF	CHN	Yuan Lu (Free Agent)
28	DF	CHN	Han Guanghua (from Yanbian Baekdu Tigers)
-	MF	CHN	Li Yang (loan return from Shenzhen Main Sports)
-	MF	CHN	Hu Hao (loan return from Hubei China-Kyle)

Out:

No.	Pos.	Nation	Player
1	GK	CHN	Li Shi (to Beijing Technology)
3	DF	CHN	Li Xin (to Hebei Zhongji)
6	MF	CHN	Yang Baoming (to Harbin Yiteng)
8	MF	CHN	Lu Jiang (loan return to Beijing Guoan)
9	FW	URU	Claudio Cardozo (to (Honduras) Real España)
10	FW	CHN	Akram (Released)
12	MF	HON	Astor Henríquez (to (Honduras) Marathón)
14	MF	CHN	Bai Yuexuan (loan return to Tianjin Teda)
15	DF	HON	Erick Norales (to (Honduras) Marathón)
19	MF	HON	Emil Martínez (to (Honduras) Marathón)
25	GK	CHN	Mu Xu (Retired)
27	MF	CHN	Zhao Wei (to Shenzhen Fengpeng)
28	MF	CHN	Dai Qinhua (to Shenyang Shenbei)
-	MF	CHN	Hu Hao (Released)
-	MF	CHN	Li Yang (to Lijiang Jiayunhao)

=== Shenyang Shenbei ===
In:

No.	Pos.	Nation	Player
4	DF	SRB	Zoran Rendulić (from (South Korea) Pohang Steelers)
5	DF	CHN	Mao Kaiyu (loan from Tianjin Teda)
6	DF	CHN	Pei Yuwen (from Yanbian Baekdu Tigers)
12	GK	CHN	Dong Chunyu (loan from Guangzhou Evergrande)
14	MF	KOR	Kim Geun-Chul (from (South Korea) Chunnam Dragons)
17	MF	CHN	Guo Zihao (from Changchun RCB Fengyun)
18	DF	CHN	Yang Jianfei (from Hohhot Dongjin)
25	DF	CHN	Sun Fabo (Free Agent)
30	MF	CHN	Dai Qinhua (from Hunan Billows)
31	MF	CHN	Wang Shixin (loan from Dalian Aerbin)
32	FW	CHN	Nan Yunqi (loan from Dalian Aerbin)

Out:

No.	Pos.	Nation	Player
2	DF	CHN	Hao Qiang (to Guizhou Zhicheng)
5	DF	CRO	Dario Dabac (Released)
8	MF	CHN	Jin Jingdao (to Shandong Luneng Taishan)
18	DF	CHN	Hua Bo (Released)
24	MF	MNE	Vladimir Vujović (Released)
25	DF	CHN	Zhao Xudong (to Chongqing F.C.)
30	FW	CHN	Fan Baiqun (loan return to Tianjin Teda)
33	GK	CHN	Zhu Jiaqi (to Shenzhen Fengpeng)

=== Shenzhen Ruby ===
In:

No.	Pos.	Nation	Player
4	DF	CHN	Liu Shuai (loan return from Shenzhen Main Sports)
5	DF	CHN	Lü Zheng (from Dalian Aerbin)
16	MF	CHN	Wang Hongliang (from Chongqing Lifan)
18	FW	CHN	Yu Shuai (from Shandong Luneng)
25	MF	CHN	Li Jiaqi (loan return from Shenzhen Main Sports)
27	MF	CHN	Zhang Guofeng (loan return from Shenzhen Main Sports)
28	MF	CHN	Ren Peng (from Hohhot Dongjin)
-	DF	CHN	Shi Yong (loan return from Shenzhen Main Sports)
-	FW	CHN	Wang Xiao (loan return from Guizhou Zhicheng)

Out:

No.	Pos.	Nation	Player
5	DF	CHN	Xiang Jun (Released)
7	MF	ARG	Leandro Guaita (Released)
18	MF	CHN	Yi Teng (to Guangzhou Evergrande)
23	FW	CHN	Huang Fengtao (to Hangzhou Greentown)
29	FW	CHN	Wang Xiao (to Hangzhou Greentown)
-	DF	CHN	Shi Yong (to Lijiang Jiayunhao)

=== Shijiazhuang Yongchang Junhao ===
In:

No.	Pos.	Nation	Player
5	DF	NZL	Steven Old (from (England) Sutton United)
10	MF	CHN	Xu Bo (from Yanbian Baekdu Tigers)
22	FW	CHN	Zhang Hao (from Hohhot Dongjin)
25	DF	CHN	Qin Peng (Free Agent)
27	DF	CHN	Chang Lin (from Dalian Aerbin)
28	FW	CHN	Ge Yuxiang (Free Agent)
30	DF	CHN	Yang Lin (from Dalian Aerbin)
32	MF	CHN	Yin Liangyi (from Harbin Yiteng)

Out:

No.	Pos.	Nation	Player
1	GK	CHN	Zhao Yang (Released)
5	DF	MNE	Vlado Jeknić (Released)
8	MF	CHN	Zhang Song (Released)
10	MF	CHN	Han Yanming (Released)
15	MF	CHN	Zheng Qiang (Released)
20	FW	CHN	Yang Fusheng (to Lijiang Jiayunhao)
22	MF	CHN	Sun Shilin (to Liaoning Whowin)
25	FW	NED	Sylvano Comvalius (Released)
28	MF	CHN	Cheng Mouyi (to Chongqing Lifan)

=== Tianjin Songjiang ===
In:

No.	Pos.	Nation	Player
3	DF	CHN	Jiang Jihong (from Dalian Shide)
5	DF	HKG	Ng Wai Chiu (from (Hong Kong) Sun Pegasus)
6	DF	CHN	Hao Tengjiao (loan return from Shaanxi Daqin)
8	MF	CHN	Zhao Yingjie (loan from Tianjin Teda)
9	FW	COL	Martín García (from (Peru) Unión Comercio)
10	MF	BRA	Vaguinho (from (Brazil) Monte Azul)
16	GK	CHN	Zhao Yanming (from Tianjin Teda)
17	FW	CHN	Cai Chuchuan (from Hangzhou Greentown)
18	FW	CHN	Wu Lei (loan return from Shenzhen Fengpeng)
21	FW	CHN	Lian Chen (loan return from Guizhou Zhicheng)
25	DF	COL	Juan Andrés Bolaños (from (Argentina) Godoy Cruz)
26	FW	CHN	Fan Baiqun (loan from Tianjin Teda)
41	GK	CHN	Gao Jingjun (from Shenzhen Fengpeng)
42	MF	CHN	Liu Song (from Tianjin Teda)
-	GK	CHN	Guo Chunquan (loan return from Shaanxi Daqin)

Out:

No.	Pos.	Nation	Player
3	DF	CHN	Yu Rui (to Guizhou Renhe)
4	DF	CHN	Zhang Sen (loan to Dali Ruilong)
6	FW	CHN	Liu Tao (to Guangdong Sunray Cave)
7	MF	CHN	Zhu Haiwei (to (Sweden) Jönköpings Södra IF)
8	FW	CHN	Wang Qiang (to Guangdong Sunray Cave)
9	FW	BRA	Anderson (to (Brazil) Votuporanguense)
10	FW	SVN	Aleksandar Rodić (to Chengdu Blades)
12	GK	CHN	Guo Chunquan (to Harbin Yiteng)
15	MF	CHN	Li Yaoyue (loan return to Tianjin Teda)
16	MF	CHN	Wu Bo (to Chengdu Blades)
17	MF	CHN	Xue Chen (to Chengdu Blades)
19	DF	CHN	Liu Shangkun (to Wuhan Zall)
26	DF	EST	Taavi Rähn (to Hunan Billows)
30	FW	CHN	Chen Yiliang (Released)
31	FW	CHN	Liu Weipeng (Released)
32	DF	CHN	Qu Tianbao (to Shaanxi Laochenggen)
33	DF	KOR	Lee Se-In (Released)

=== Yanbian Changbai Tiger ===
In:

No.	Pos.	Nation	Player
5	FW	KOR	Ko Ki-Gu (from (South Korea) Daejeon KHNP)
9	FW	KOR	Lee Jae-Min (from (South Korea) Ulsan Dolphin)
11	MF	KOR	Kim Ki-Soo (from (Thailand) Ayutthaya F.C.)
32	MF	CHN	Piao Qianhua (loan from Changchun Yatai)

Out:

No.	Pos.	Nation	Player
3	DF	CHN	Han Guanghua (to Hunan Billows)
5	DF	CRO	Stipe Lapić (to Chongqing F.C.)
6	DF	CHN	Pei Yuwen (to Shenyang Shenbei)
7	FW	CHN	Gao Wanguo (to Jiangxi Liansheng)
8	MF	CHN	Cui Yongzhe (to Chongqing Lifan)
9	FW	CHN	Xu Bo (to Shijiazhuang Yongchang Junhao)
10	MF	MLI	Soumaila Coulibaly (Released)
11	FW	KOR	Hong Jin-Sub (Released)
12	DF	CHN	Jiang Hongquan (to Guizhou Zhicheng)
15	DF	CHN	Li Guang (Released)
19	MF	CHN	Han Songfeng (to Lijiang Jiayunhao)
24	MF	CHN	Han Hao (to Chongqing F.C.)
32	DF	CHN	Yao Bo (loan return to Dalian Shide)
40	FW	BIH	Ivan Božić (to Guizhou Zhicheng)

== Dissolved ==
=== Dalian Shide ===
In:

No.	Pos.	Nation	Player
-	MF	CHN	Li Zhichao (loan return from Beijing Baxy)
-	MF	CHN	Wang Liang (loan return from Beijing Yitong Kuche)
-	FW	CHN	Han Jiabao (loan return from Hebei Zhongji)
-	DF	CHN	Yao Bo (loan return from Yanbian Baekdu Tigers)
-	GK	CHN	Zhang Zhenqiang (loan return from Shanghai Shenxin)

Out:

No.	Pos.	Nation	Player
1	GK	CHN	Sun Shoubo (to Wuhan Zall)
3	DF	CHN	Zheng Jianfeng (to Qingdao Jonoon)
4	DF	CHN	Xue Ya'nan (to Dalian Aerbin)
5	DF	CHN	Yang Boyu (to Dalian Aerbin)
6	DF	CHN	Zhang Yaokun (to Guangzhou R&F)
8	DF	CHN	Zhu Ting (to Wuhan Zall)
9	FW	BUL	Martin Kamburov (to (Bulgaria) PFC CSKA Sofia)
10	FW	BRA	Adriano (loan to (Brazil) Bahia)
11	FW	ZAM	James Chamanga (to Liaoning Whowin)
12	GK	CHN	Jiang Hao (to Jiangsu Sainty)
13	MF	CHN	Quan Lei (to Qingdao Jonoon)
14	FW	CHN	Zhao Xuebin (to Dalian Aerbin)
15	DF	CHN	Zhao Mingjian (to Shandong Luneng)
16	MF	CHN	Hao Xingchen (Released)
20	FW	POR	Ricardo Esteves (Released)
22	GK	CHN	Zhang Chong (to Dalian Aerbin)
23	DF	KOR	Park Dong-Hyuk (to (South Korea) Ulsan Hyundai)
25	DF	CHN	Jiang Jihong (to Tianjin Songjiang)
27	DF	CHN	Li Xuepeng (to Dalian Aerbin)
29	MF	CHN	Sun Guowen (to Dalian Aerbin)
30	MF	CHN	Ni Yusong (to Liaoning Whowin)
33	MF	CHN	Wang Liang (to Liaoning Whowin)
42	FW	CHN	Nan Yunqi (to Dalian Aerbin)
46	MF	CHN	Wang Shixin (to Dalian Aerbin)
-	GK	CHN	Zhang Zhenqiang (to Dalian Aerbin)
-	FW	CHN	Han Jiabao (to Dalian Aerbin)
