= List of Chinese football transfers summer 2012 =

This is a list of Chinese football transfers for the 2012 season summer transfer window. Only moves from Super League and League One are listed. The transfer window opened from 18 June 2012 to 12 July 2012.

== Super League ==
=== Beijing Guoan ===
In: Note: Flags indicate national team as defined under FIFA eligibility rules; some limited exceptions apply. Players may hold more than one non-FIFA nationality.

No.	Pos.	Nation	Player
11	FW	MLI	Frédéric Kanouté (from (Spain) Sevilla)
27	DF	CHN	Zhang Yonghai (loan return from Guangdong Sunray Cave)
32	MF	ECU	Joffre Guerrón (from (Brazil) Atlético Paranaense)

Out: Note: Flags indicate national team as defined under FIFA eligibility rules; some limited exceptions apply. Players may hold more than one non-FIFA nationality.

No.	Pos.	Nation	Player
1	GK	CHN	Zhang Sipeng (loan to Beijing Yitong Kuche)
15	FW	SRB	Andrija Kaluđerović (loan to (Spain) Racing de Santander)

=== Changchun Yatai ===
In:

No.	Pos.	Nation	Player
26	FW	CHN	Pan Chaoran (loan return from Shanghai Shenxin)
33	MF	COL	Edixon Perea (from (Mexico) Cruz Azul)
37	MF	BUL	Marquinhos (from (Cyprus) Anorthosis Famagusta)

Out:

No.	Pos.	Nation	Player
8	MF	CHN	Du Zhenyu (loan to Tianjin Teda)
10	MF	SRB	Marko Ljubinković (to (Serbia) FK Rad)

=== Dalian Aerbin ===
In:

No.	Pos.	Nation	Player
4	DF	CHN	Ji Zhengyu (Free Agent)
16	DF	AUS	Daniel Mullen (from (Australia) Adelaide United)
20	MF	MLI	Seydou Keita (from (Spain) Barcelona CF)
41	DF	CHN	Shan Pengfei (Free Agent)
42	MF	CHN	Cui Ming'an (Free Agent)

Out:

No.	Pos.	Nation	Player
9	FW	AUS	Mile Sterjovski (to (Australia) Central Coast Mariners)
19	FW	CHI	Gustavo Canales (to (Argentina) Arsenal de Sarandí)
25	MF	CHN	Eddy François (loan to Shanghai Tellace)

=== Dalian Shide ===
In:

No.	Pos.	Nation	Player

Out:

No.	Pos.	Nation	Player
18	MF	CHN	Li Zhichao (loan to Beijing Baxy)
33	MF	CHN	Wang Liang (loan to Beijing Yitong Kuche)
48	MF	CHN	Yan Song (to Shanghai Shenhua)

=== Guangzhou Evergrande ===
In:

No.	Pos.	Nation	Player
18	FW	PAR	Lucas Barrios (from (Germany) Borussia Dortmund)
28	DF	KOR	Kim Young-Gwon (from (Japan) Omiya Ardija)
42	MF	CHN	Huang Bowen (from (South Korea) Jeonbuk Hyundai Motors)
-	MF	BRA	Renato Cajá (loan return from (Brazil) Ponte Preta)

Out:

No.	Pos.	Nation	Player
33	MF	CHN	Li Yan (loan to Guangzhou R&F)
-	MF	BRA	Renato Cajá (loan to (Japan) Kashima Antlers)

=== Guangzhou R&F ===
In:

No.	Pos.	Nation	Player
25	FW	NGA	Yakubu (from (England) Blackburn Rovers)
33	MF	CHN	Li Yan (loan from Guangzhou Evergrande)
38	FW	CHN	Wen Shuo (from (Portugal) C.D. Mafra)

Out:

No.	Pos.	Nation	Player
28	MF	CHN	Huang Long (Released)
31	FW	BRA	Leonardo (loan return to (Brazil) Coritiba)

=== Guizhou Renhe ===
In:

No.	Pos.	Nation	Player
10	MF	ESP	Rubén Suárez (from (Spain) Levante)
—	MF	CHN	Li Shuai (loan return from Shaanxi Laochenggen)

Out:

No.	Pos.	Nation	Player
13	MF	CHN	Wang Erzhuo (loan to Shaanxi Laochenggen)
20	MF	ARG	Gustavo Rodas (to (Peru) León de Huánuco)
26	MF	CHN	Liao Linkun (loan to Shaanxi Laochenggen)
38	FW	CHN	Zhang Chengxiang (loan to Shaanxi Laochenggen)
—	MF	CHN	Li Shuai (loan to (Portugal) Porto)

=== Hangzhou Greentown ===
In:

No.	Pos.	Nation	Player
53	MF	CHN	Zhuang Jiajie (loan return from (United States) FC Dallas)
-	FW	CHN	Tan Yang (Free Agent)

Out:

No.	Pos.	Nation	Player
4	DF	CHN	Cai Shun (to Wuhan Zall)
5	DF	CHN	Du Wei (to Shandong Luneng Taishan)
12	FW	CHN	Cai Chuchuan (loan to Shaanxi Daqin)
-	FW	CHN	Tan Yang (loan to Hebei Zhongji)

=== Henan Jianye ===
In:

No.	Pos.	Nation	Player
31	MF	ZAM	Isaac Chansa (from (South Africa) Orlando Pirates)
32	MF	CHN	Du Jinlong (Free Agent)
33	FW	HKG	Godfred Karikari (from (Hong Kong) TSW Pegasus)
34	DF	BRA	Adaílton (from (Switzerland) FC Sion)

Out:

No.	Pos.	Nation	Player
5	DF	TUN	Enis Hajri (to (Germany) 1.FC Kaiserslautern)
10	FW	ARG	Marcos Flores (to (Australia) Melbourne Victory)
36	DF	CHN	Liu Dongyang (to Dongguan Nancheng)

=== Jiangsu Sainty ===
In:

No.	Pos.	Nation	Player
21	MF	BLR	Sergey Krivets (from (Poland) Lech Poznań)
25	MF	CHN	Ye Hui (from (Thailand) PTT Rayong)
30	FW	CHN	Li Zhenhuan (from Hebei Zhongji)
31	FW	CHN	Zhang Jiabei (from Hebei Zhongji)

Out:

No.	Pos.	Nation	Player
7	FW	SRB	Miljan Mrdaković (Released)

=== Liaoning Whowin ===
In:

No.	Pos.	Nation	Player

Out:

No.	Pos.	Nation	Player
30	DF	CHN	Li Tie (Retired)
37	MF	CHN	Wang Shouting (to Shanghai Shenhua)

=== Qingdao Jonoon ===
In:

No.	Pos.	Nation	Player
4	DF	CHN	Hu Jun (loan return from (Portugal) Varzim S.C.)
9	FW	BRA	Bruno Meneghel (from (Brazil) América-MG)

Out:

No.	Pos.	Nation	Player
11	FW	CRO	Krunoslav Lovrek (to (Australia) Sydney FC)

=== Shandong Luneng ===
In:

No.	Pos.	Nation	Player
3	DF	CHN	Du Wei (from Hangzhou Greentown)
31	MF	MOZ	Simão Mate Junior (from (Greece) Panathinaikos)
32	MF	ARG	Leonardo Pisculichi (from (Qatar) Al-Arabi SC)
33	FW	PAR	José Ortigoza (from (Paraguay) Sol de América)
-	DF	BRA	Renato Silva (loan return from (Brazil) Vasco da Gama)

Out:

No.	Pos.	Nation	Player
4	DF	BRA	Fabiano (Released)
10	FW	BRA	Obina (loan to (Brazil) Palmeiras)
-	DF	BRA	Renato Silva (to (Brazil) Vasco da Gama)

=== Shanghai Shenhua ===
In:

No.	Pos.	Nation	Player
11	FW	CIV	Didier Drogba (from (England) Chelsea)
12	DF	CHN	Bai Jiajun (loan from Shanghai Tellace)
18	MF	MAS	Tam Sheang Tsung (Free Agent)
33	MF	CHN	Yan Song (from Dalian Shide)
36	MF	CHN	Wang Shouting (from Liaoning Whowin)
37	MF	COL	Giovanni Moreno (from (Argentina) Racing)
38	MF	CHN	Wang Hongliang (loan from Chongqing Lifan)

Out:

No.	Pos.	Nation	Player
9	FW	FRA	Mathieu Manset (loan return to (England) Reading)
25	MF	BIH	Mario Božić (to (Azerbaijan) Simurq PFC)

=== Shanghai Shenxin ===
In:

No.	Pos.	Nation	Player

Out:

No.	Pos.	Nation	Player
18	FW	CHN	Pan Chaoran (loan return to Changchun Yatai)

=== Tianjin Teda ===
In:

No.	Pos.	Nation	Player
31	MF	SRB	Vladimir Jovančić (loan from (South Korea) Seongnam Ilhwa Chunma)
35	MF	CHN	Du Zhenyu (loan from Changchun Yatai)

Out:

No.	Pos.	Nation	Player
16	FW	ENG	Akpo Sodje (to (England) Preston North End)

== League One ==
=== Beijing Baxy ===
In:

No.	Pos.	Nation	Player
16	MF	CHN	Li Zhichao (loan from Dalian Shide)
32	FW	SEN	Momar N'Diaye (from (Germany) FSV Frankfurt)

Out:

No.	Pos.	Nation	Player
6	DF	CRO	Saša Mus (Released)

=== Beijing Technology ===
In:

No.	Pos.	Nation	Player
36	MF	CHN	Sang Yifei (loan from Wuhan Zall)
37	FW	URU	Walter Guglielmone (from (Brazil) Pelotas)
39	GK	CHN	Bi Yifei (Free Agent)

Out:

No.	Pos.	Nation	Player
32	FW	CMR	Vicent Rodrigue (Released)

=== Chengdu Blades ===
In:

No.	Pos.	Nation	Player
20	FW	ANG	Johnson Macaba (from (Brazil) Atlético Sorocaba)
31	MF	CHN	Dai Kunpeng (from Jiangxi Liansheng)
32	FW	CHN	Zou You (from Fushun Xinye)

Out:

No.	Pos.	Nation	Player
9	FW	BRA	Ygor de Souza (Released)

=== Chongqing F.C. ===
In:

No.	Pos.	Nation	Player
27	MF	CHN	He Fang (from Jiangxi Liansheng)

Out:

No.	Pos.	Nation	Player

=== Chongqing Lifan ===
In:

No.	Pos.	Nation	Player
15	FW	BRA	Nei (Free Agent)

Out:

No.	Pos.	Nation	Player
8	MF	CHN	Wang Hongliang (loan to Shanghai Shenhua)

=== Fujian Smart Hero ===
In:

No.	Pos.	Nation	Player

Out:

No.	Pos.	Nation	Player

=== Guangdong Sunray Cave ===
In:

No.	Pos.	Nation	Player
9	FW	BRA	Dori (loan from (Brazil) Fluminense)
24	FW	CHN	Yang Bin (Free Agent)
25	MF	CHN	Pan Jia (loan return from (Hong Kong) Sun Hei SC)
29	MF	HKG	Leung Chun Pong (from (Hong Kong) South China)
31	DF	CHN	Li Zhihai (from Shenzhen Main Sports)
32	GK	CHN	Hou Yu (loan return from (Hong Kong) Sun Hei SC)
33	FW	HKG	Chan Siu Ki (from (Hong Kong) South China)
35	DF	CHN	Liao Junjian (from Dongguan Nancheng)

Out:

No.	Pos.	Nation	Player
5	MF	CRO	Josip Milardović (to (Croatia) NK Inter Zaprešić)
19	MF	CHN	Xiao Yifeng (loan to (Hong Kong) Sun Pegasus FC)
29	DF	CHN	Zhang Yonghai (loan return to Beijing Guoan)

=== Harbin Yiteng ===
In:

No.	Pos.	Nation	Player
35	FW	AUS	Million Butshiire (from (Australia) Perth Glory)

Out:

No.	Pos.	Nation	Player
32	DF	UKR	Oleksandr Krutskevich ( (Azerbaijan) Turan Tovuz)
33	FW	CHN	Shi Jun (loan to Qinghai Senke)

=== Hohhot Dongjin ===
In:

No.	Pos.	Nation	Player

Out:

No.	Pos.	Nation	Player

=== Hunan Billows ===
In:

No.	Pos.	Nation	Player

Out:

No.	Pos.	Nation	Player

=== Shanghai Tellace ===
In:

No.	Pos.	Nation	Player
26	MF	CHN	Eddy François (loan from Dalian Aerbin)
27	FW	CHN	Xian Xiaolong (Free Agent)
33	DF	BRA	Bruno Camacho (from (Belgium) Standaard Wetteren)

Out:

No.	Pos.	Nation	Player
17	FW	CMR	Didier Njewel (Released)
23	DF	CHN	Bai Jiajun (loan to Shanghai Shenhua)

=== Shenyang Shenbei ===
In:

No.	Pos.	Nation	Player

Out:

No.	Pos.	Nation	Player
31	FW	MAR	Mustapha Allaoui (Released)

=== Shenzhen Ruby ===
In:

No.	Pos.	Nation	Player
7	MF	ARG	Leandro Guaita (Free Agent)
13	FW	CHN	Zhou Wen (loan return from Shenzhen Main Sports)

Out:

No.	Pos.	Nation	Player
29	FW	CHN	Wang Xiao (loan to Guizhou Zhicheng)
39	FW	HON	Rony Flores (loan return to (Honduras) Marathón)

=== Tianjin Songjiang ===
In:

No.	Pos.	Nation	Player

Out:

No.	Pos.	Nation	Player
12	GK	CHN	Guo Chunquan (to Shaanxi Daqin)
18	FW	CHN	Wu Lei (to Shenzhen Fengpeng)
21	FW	CHN	Lian Chen (loan to Guizhou Zhicheng)

=== Wuhan Zall ===
In:

No.	Pos.	Nation	Player
35	DF	CHN	Cai Shun (from Hangzhou Greentown)
36	FW	COL	Carlos Ceballos (from (Israel) Maccabi Ahi Nazareth)

Out:

No.	Pos.	Nation	Player
9	FW	COL	César Valoyes (to (Colombia) Real Cartagena)
33	MF	CHN	Sang Yifei (loan to Beijing Technology)

=== Yanbian Changbai Tiger ===
In:

No.	Pos.	Nation	Player
40	FW	BIH	Ivan Božić (from (Croatia) Hrvatski Dragovoljac)

Out:

No.	Pos.	Nation	Player
20	FW	BRA	Ronaille Calheira (to (Peru) León de Huánuco)
