= Guaita (disambiguation) =

Guaita is one of three peaks which overlooks the city of San Marino.

It may also refer to the following people with the surname:

Guaita

- Enrique Guaita (1910–1959), Italian Argentine international footballer
- Inmaculada Guaita Vañó (born 1965), Spanish politician
- Leandro Guaita (born 1986), Argentine footballer
- Ovidio Guaita, Italian journalist and photographer
- Raffaele Guaita (1922–1996), Italian footballer
- Vicente Guaita (born 1987), Spanish footballer

De Guaita

- Stanislas de Guaita (1861–1897), French poet and member of the Rosicrucian Order
