= Ygor =

Ygor is a masculine given name, a variant of Igor, which may refer to:

== People ==
- Ygor (footballer, born 1984), Brazilian football midfielder Ygor Maciel Santiago
- Ygor (footballer, born 1986), Brazilian football striker Ygor Tadeu de Souza
- Ygor Catatau, Brazilian football forward Ygor de Oliveira Ferreira (born 1995)
- Ygor Coelho (born 1996), Brazilian badminton player
- Ygor Nogueira (born 1995), Brazilian football centre-back
- Ygor da Silva, also known as Nena (footballer, born 1981), Brazilian football forward
- Ygor Vinhas (born 1994), Brazilian football goalkeeper

== Fictional characters ==
- Ygor, a film role played by actor Bela Lugosi in a pair of Universal Frankenstein films
- an alternative spelling for Igor (character), a stock character
