= Yanming =

Yanming is a given name. Notable people with the name include:

- Han Yanming (born 1982), Chinese football player who currently plays for Henan Construction as a midfielder in the Chinese Super League
- Shi Yanming (born 1964), Shaolin warrior monk
- Yan Yanming (1983–2005), Chinese mass murderer who killed nine schoolboys in 2004
- Zhao Yanming (born 1981), Chinese football player who currently plays for Tianjin Teda as a goalkeeper in the Chinese Super League
