= Pei Yuwen =

Chinese footballer

Pei Yuwen 배육문 裴育文
Personal information
- Date of birth: 4 July 1985 (age 41)
- Place of birth: Longjing, Jilin, China
- Height: 1.73 m (5 ft 8 in)
- Positions: Defensive midfielder; defender

Team information
- Current team: Yanbian Longding
- Number: 6

Senior career*
Years	Team	Apps	(Gls)
2005–2012	Yanbian FC	170	(5)
2013–2014	Shenyang Zhongze	46	(0)
2015–2018	Yanbian FC	90	(1)
2019	Yanbian Beiguo	6	(0)
2020–	Yanbian Longding	-	(-)
- * Club domestic league appearances and goals as of 31 December 2020

Pei Yuwen
- Simplified Chinese: 裴育文
Transcriptions
Standard Mandarin
- Hanyu Pinyin: Péi Yùwén
- IPA: [pʰěɪ ŷ wə̌n]

Chinese Korean name
- Chosŏn'gŭl: 배육문
Transcriptions
- Revised Romanization: Bae Yukmun
- McCune–Reischauer: Pae Yungmun

Pei Yuwen (Chinese: 裴育文; Korean: 배육문; born 4 July 1985) is a Chinese footballer who currently plays for China League Two side Yanbian Longding.

== Club career ==
Pei Yuwen was born in Longjing, Yanbian. He started his professional football career in 2005 when he was promoted to Yanbian FC's first squad. On 5 January 2013, Pei transferred to fellow China League One side Shenyang Zhongze on a free transfer. Pei returned to Yanbian FC in February 2015. He played 26 league matches in the 2015 season as Yanbian won promotion to the Chinese Super League. On 5 March 2016, Pei made his Super League debut in the first match of 2016 season against Shanghai Shenhua.

== Career statistics ==
Statistics accurate as of match played 31 December 2020.

Club performance			League		National Cup		Continental		Other		Total	
Club	Season	League	Apps	Goals	Apps	Goals	Apps	Goals	Apps	Goals	Apps	Goals
Yanbian FC	2005	China League One	19	0	0	0	-		-		19	0
Yanbian FC	2006	China League One	14	0	0	0	-		-		14	0
Yanbian FC	2007	China League One	20	0	-		-		-		20	0
Yanbian FC	2008	China League One	21	0	-		-		-		21	0
Yanbian FC	2009	China League One	21	2	-		-		-		21	2
Yanbian FC	2010	China League One	22	1	-		-		-		22	1
Yanbian FC	2011	China League One	25	2	0	0	-		-		25	2
Yanbian FC	2012	China League One	28	0	1	0	-		-		29	0
Yanbian FC	Total		170	5	1	0	0	0	0	0	171	4
Shenyang Zhongze	2013	China League One	30	0	1	0	-		-		31	0
Shenyang Zhongze	2014	China League One	16	0	1	0	-		-		17	0
Shenyang Zhongze	Total		46	0	2	0	0	0	0	0	48	0
Yanbian FC	2015	China League One	26	0	0	0	-		-		26	0
Yanbian FC	2016	Chinese Super League	29	0	0	0	-		-		29	0
Yanbian FC	2017	Chinese Super League	14	0	0	0	-		-		14	0
Yanbian FC	2018	China League One	21	1	1	0	-		-		22	1
Yanbian FC	Total		90	1	1	0	0	0	0	0	181	0
Yanbian Beiguo	2019	China League Two	6	0	0	0	-		-		6	0
Yanbian Longding	2020	CMCL	-		-		-		-		0	0
Career total			312	6	4	0	0	0	0	0	316	6

== Honours ==
=== Club ===
Yanbian FC

- China League One: 2015
