= Jiang Hongquan =

Chinese footballer

Jiang Hongquan 강홍권 姜洪权
Personal information
- Date of birth: 2 January 1987 (age 39)
- Place of birth: Helong, Jilin, China
- Height: 1.77 m (5 ft 10 in)
- Position: Defender

Senior career*
| Years | Team | Apps | (Gls) |
| 2006–2018 | Yanbian FC | 224 | (2) |
- * Club domestic league appearances and goals as of 3 November 2018

Jiang Hongquan
- Simplified Chinese: 姜洪权
Transcriptions
Standard Mandarin
- Hanyu Pinyin: Jiāng Hóngquán
- IPA: [tɕjáŋ xʊ̌ŋ.tɕʰɥɛ̌n]

Chinese Korean name
- Chosŏn'gŭl: 강홍권
Transcriptions
- Revised Romanization: Gang Honggwon
- McCune–Reischauer: Kang Honggwŏn

Jiang Hongquan (Chinese: 姜洪权; Korean: 강홍권; born 2 January 1987) is a Chinese footballer.

== Club career ==
Jiang Hongquan started his professional football career in 2006 when he was promoted to Yanbian FC's first squad. On 5 March 2016, Jiang made his Super League debut in the first match of 2016 season against Shanghai Shenhua.

== Career statistics ==
Statistics accurate as of match played 3 November 2018.

| Club performance | | | League | | Cup | | League Cup | | Continental | | Total | |
| Season | Club | League | Apps | Goals | Apps | Goals | Apps | Goals | Apps | Goals | Apps | Goals |
|---|---|---|---|---|---|---|---|---|---|---|---|---|
| 2006 | Yanbian FC | China League One | 8 | 0 | 0 | 0 | - | | - | | 8 | 0 |
| 2007 | Yanbian FC | China League One | 16 | 0 | - | | - | | - | | 16 | 0 |
| 2008 | Yanbian FC | China League One | 15 | 0 | - | | - | | - | | 15 | 0 |
| 2009 | Yanbian FC | China League One | 21 | 0 | - | | - | | - | | 21 | 0 |
| 2010 | Yanbian FC | China League One | 22 | 0 | - | | - | | - | | 22 | 0 |
| 2011 | Yanbian FC | China League One | 17 | 0 | 0 | 0 | - | | - | | 17 | 0 |
| 2012 | Yanbian FC | China League One | 19 | 0 | 0 | 0 | - | | - | | 19 | 0 |
| 2013 | Yanbian FC | China League One | 26 | 0 | 0 | 0 | - | | - | | 26 | 0 |
| 2014 | Yanbian FC | China League One | 25 | 0 | 2 | 0 | - | | - | | 27 | 0 |
| 2015 | Yanbian FC | China League One | 29 | 2 | 0 | 0 | - | | - | | 29 | 2 |
| 2016 | Yanbian FC | Chinese Super League | 19 | 0 | 0 | 0 | - | | - | | 19 | 0 |
| 2017 | Yanbian FC | Chinese Super League | 7 | 0 | 0 | 0 | - | | - | | 7 | 0 |
| 2018 | Yanbian FC | China League One | 0 | 0 | 0 | 0 | - | | - | | 0 | 0 |
| Total | | | 224 | 2 | 2 | 0 | 0 | 0 | 0 | 0 | 226 | 2 |

== Honours ==
Yanbian FC

- China League One: 2015
