= Wang Fa =

Chinese footballer (born 1993)

Wang Fa 王珐
Personal information
- Date of birth: 17 January 1993 (age 33)
- Place of birth: Shenyang, Liaoning, China
- Height: 1.75 m (5 ft 9 in)
- Position: Midfielder

Team information
- Current team: Shaoxing Shangyu Pterosaur

Youth career
- Changchun Yatai

Senior career*
Years	Team	Apps	(Gls)
2012	Changchun Yatai	0	(0)
2013–2019	Liaoning Whowin	24	(2)
2020	Shanxi Longjin	9	(0)
2021	Xiamen Egret Island	5	(0)
2022-	Shaoxing Shangyu Pterosaur	0	(0)
- * Club domestic league appearances and goals as of 6 May 2022

Wang Fa (Chinese: 王珐; born 17 January 1993 in Shenyang) is a Chinese football player who currently plays for China League Two side Shaoxing Shangyu Pterosaur.

== Club career ==
In 2012, Wang Fa started his professional football career with Changchun Yatai in the Chinese Super League. In February 2013, he was transferred to the Chinese Super League side Liaoning Whowin. He made his senior league debut for Liaoning on 3 November 2013 in a game against Changchun Yatai, coming on as a substitute for Zhang Xiaoyu in the 75th minute.

== Club career statistics ==
Statistics accurate as of match played 2 November 2019.

Club performance			League		Cup		League Cup		Continental		Total	
Season	Club	League	Apps	Goals	Apps	Goals	Apps	Goals	Apps	Goals	Apps	Goals
China PR			League		FA Cup		CSL Cup		Asia		Total	
2012	Changchun Yatai	Chinese Super League	0	0	0	0	-		-		0	0
2013	Liaoning Whowin	Chinese Super League	1	0	0	0	-		-		1	0
2014	Liaoning Whowin	Chinese Super League	1	0	0	0	-		-		1	0
2015	Liaoning Whowin	Chinese Super League	3	0	0	0	-		-		3	0
2016	Liaoning Whowin	Chinese Super League	1	0	1	0	-		-		2	0
2017	Liaoning Whowin	Chinese Super League	0	0	1	0	-		-		1	0
2018	Liaoning Whowin	China League One	1	1	2	0	-		-		3	1
2019	Liaoning Whowin	China League One	17	1	1	0	-		-		18	1
Total	China PR		24	1	5	0	0	0	0	0	29	2
