= Wang Shixin =

Chinese footballer

王世鑫 Wang Shixin
Personal information
- Date of birth: January 9, 1993 (age 33)
- Place of birth: Dalian, Liaoning, China
- Height: 1.80 m (5 ft 11 in)
- Position: Midfielder

Team information
- Current team: Dalian Yingbo B
- Number: 46

Senior career*
Years	Team	Apps	(Gls)
2011–2012	Dalian Shide	7	(0)
2013–2014	Dalian Aerbin	0	(0)
2013	→ Shenyang Shenbei (loan)	1	(0)
2016–2017	Dalian Boyang	22	(3)
2018–2020	Yunnan Kunlu	36	(1)
2021	Xi'an Wolves	14	(0)
2022	Zhuhai Qin'ao	10	(0)
2022	Xinjiang Tianshan Leoopard	10	(0)
2023	Guangxi Pingguo Haliao	1	(0)
2024	Dalian Yingbo	0	(0)
2025	Dalian Hanyu	8	(0)
2026–	Dalian Yingbo B	0	(0)
- * Club domestic league appearances and goals as of 1 September 2024

Wang Shixin (Chinese: 王世鑫; born 9 January 1993) is a Chinese football player, who plays for Dalian Yingbo B in the China League Two.

== Club career ==
Wang Shixin started his professional football career in 2011 when he was promoted to Chinese Super League side Dalian Shide. On 1 July 2012, he made his debut for Dalian Shide in the 2012 Chinese Super League against Guizhou Renhe, coming on as a substitute for Jiang Jihong in the 79th minute. He made 6 league appearances in the 2012 league season.

In 2013, Wang transferred to Dalian Aerbin after Dalian Shide dissolved. On 1 March 2013，he moved to China League One side Shenyang Shenbei on a one-year loan deal.

== Career statistics ==
Statistics accurate as of match played 1 September 2024.

Appearances and goals by club, season and competition
Club	Season	League			National Cup		Continental		Other		Total	
Club	Season	Division	Apps	Goals	Apps	Goals	Apps	Goals	Apps	Goals	Apps	Goals
Dalian Shide	2011	Chinese Super League	0	0	0	0	-		-		0	0
Dalian Shide	2012	Chinese Super League	6	0	2	0	-		-		8	0
Dalian Shide	Total		6	0	2	0	0	0	0	0	8	0
Dalian Aerbin	2014	Chinese Super League	0	0	0	0	-		-		0	0
Shenyang Shenbei (loan)	2013	China League One	1	0	1	0	-		-		2	0
Dalian Boyang	2015	CAL	-				-		-			
Dalian Boyang	2016	CAL	-		3	0	-		-		3	0
Dalian Boyang	2017	China League Two	22	3	2	0	-		-		24	3
Dalian Boyang	Total		22	3	5	0	0	0	0	0	27	3
Yunnan Kunlu	2018	CMCL	-		-		-		-		0	0
Yunnan Kunlu	2019	China League Two	27	1	3	0	-		-		30	1
Yunnan Kunlu	2020	China League Two	9	0	-		-		-		9	0
Yunnan Kunlu	Total		36	1	3	0	0	0	0	0	39	1
Xi'an Wolves	2021	China League Two	14	0	3	0	-		-		17	0
Zhuhai Qin'ao	2022	China League Two	10	0	-		-		-		10	0
Xinjiang Tianshan Leoopard	2022	China League One	10	0	0	0	-		-		10	0
Guangxi Pingguo Haliao	2023	China League One	1	0	1	0	-		-		2	0
Dalian Yingbo	2024	China League One	0	0	1	0	-		-		1	0
Career total			100	4	16	0	0	0	0	0	116	4
