= Cheng Mouyi =

Chinese footballer

Cheng Mouyi 程谋义
Personal information
- Full name: Cheng Mouyi
- Date of birth: 24 February 1985 (age 41)
- Place of birth: Wuhan, Hubei, China
- Height: 1.79 m (5 ft 10 1/2 in)
- Positions: Midfielder; defender

Senior career*
Years	Team	Apps	(Gls)
2004–2009	Hangzhou Greentown	109	(1)
2004	→ Balkan Botevgrad (loan)	14	(0)
2004	→ South China (loan)	6	(0)
2010–2011	Spartak Subotica	3	(0)
2012	Fujian Smart Hero	29	(2)
2013–2015	Chongqing Lifan	42	(6)
2016–2018	Zhejiang Greentown	38	(1)
2019–2021	Suzhou Dongwu	17	(0)
- * Club domestic league appearances and goals as of 24 December 2023

Cheng Mouyi (Chinese: 程谋义; born on 24 February 1985) is a Chinese retired footballer who played as either a midfielder or right-back.

== Club career ==
Cheng started his professional football career when he joined Zhejiang Lucheng in 2000 as a youth player. With them he would graduate from their youth team to their senior team and establish himself as a prominent member within the team. This was to coincide with Zhejiang Lucheng's steady progress towards to the top tier, which eventually happened in the 2007 league season when Zhejiang won promoted after coming second in the second tier. Cheng would play a major part in keeping Zhejiang in the 2007 Chinese Super League table when he played in 24 league games. When Zhejiang Lucheng renamed themselves Hangzhou Greentown in the 2008 Chinese Super League season and move to Hangzhou, Cheng would follow them and continue to be an important member of the team when he played in a further 23 league games to help establish his team in the top tier. He was released by Hangzhou at the end of 2009.

He joined Serbian SuperLiga side Spartak Subotica on a free transfer and he made his debut on 22 July 2010, in a 2–0 home win against FC Differdange 03 at the Second leg of 2010–11 UEFA Europa League Second qualifying round. Throughout the season he would only play in three league games before being released at the end of the season and return to China where he joined second tier football club Fujian Smart Hero at the beginning of the 2012 Chinese league season.

On 26 January 2016, Cheng returned to Hangzhou Greentown.

== Career statistics ==
Statistics accurate as of match played 31 December 2019.

Appearances and goals by club, season and competition
Club	Season	League			National Cup		League Cup		Continental		Total	
Club	Season	Division	Apps	Goals	Apps	Goals	Apps	Goals	Apps	Goals	Apps	Goals
Hangzhou Greentown	2004	China League One	0	0	0	0	-		-		0	0
Hangzhou Greentown	2005	China League One	18	1	2	0	-		-		20	1
Hangzhou Greentown	2006	China League One	22	0	4	0	-		-		26	0
Hangzhou Greentown	2007	Chinese Super League	24	0	-		-		-		24	0
Hangzhou Greentown	2008	Chinese Super League	24	0	-		-		-		24	0
Hangzhou Greentown	2009	Chinese Super League	21	0	-		-		-		21	0
Hangzhou Greentown	Total		109	1	6	0	0	0	0	0	115	1
Balkan Botevgrad (loan)	2004	Bulgarian V AFG	14	0	0	0	-		-		14	0
South China (loan)	2004–05	Hong Kong First Division League	6	0	0	0	0	0	-		6	0
Spartak Subotica	2010–11	Serbian SuperLiga	3	0	1	0	-		2	0	6	0
Fujian Smart Hero	2012	China League One	29	2	0	0	-		-		29	2
Chongqing Lifan	2013	China League One	22	4	1	0	-		-		23	4
Chongqing Lifan	2014	China League One	16	2	1	0	-		-		8	0
Chongqing Lifan	2015	Chinese Super League	4	0	1	1	-		-		5	1
Chongqing Lifan	Total		42	6	3	1	0	0	0	0	49	7
Zhejiang Greentown	2016	Chinese Super League	18	1	2	0	-		-		20	1
Zhejiang Greentown	2017	China League One	14	0	1	0	-		-		14	0
Zhejiang Greentown	2018	China League One	6	0	1	0	-		-		7	0
Zhejiang Greentown	Total		38	1	4	0	0	0	0	0	42	1
Suzhou Dongwu	2019	China League Two	9	0	0	0	-		-		9	0
Career total			250	10	14	1	0	0	2	0	266	11

== Honours ==
Chongqing Lifan

- China League One: 2014
