= Li Xiangbin =

Chinese association football player

Personal information
- Date of birth: 17 March 1991 (age 35)
- Place of birth: Jinan, Shandong, China
- Height: 1.72 m (5 ft 8 in)
- Position: Midfielder

Team information
- Current team: Nantong Zhiyun (Team manager)

Youth career
- –2011: Chongqing Liangjiang Athletic

Senior career*
Years	Team	Apps	(Gls)
2011–2014	Chongqing Lifan	1	(0)
2013	→ Beijing IT (loan)	0	(0)
2014	→ Beijing IT (loan)	17	(1)
2015	Beijing IT	26	(1)
2016–2023	Nantong Zhiyun	184	(4)

Managerial career
- 2023–: Nantong Zhiyun (team manager)
- 2025: Nantong Zhiyun (caretaker)
- * Club domestic league appearances and goals as of 14:01, 31 December 2022 (UTC)

Li Xiangbin (Chinese: 李湘彬; born 17 March 1991) is a Chinese former footballer who played as a midfielder.

== Club career ==
Li Xiangbin would play for Chongqing Lifan's youth before being promoted to their senior team in the 2010 league season. He would go on to make his debut on 4 May 2011 in a 2011 Chinese FA Cup game against Beijing Baxy that ended in a 3–0 victory. To gain more playing time he would be loaned out to second tier club Beijing IT on 17 February 2013 along with his teammate Du Wenxiang. He would on to make his move permanent at Beijing, however he would go on to be part of the team that was relegated at the end of the 2015 China League One season.

The following season, Li would join third tier club Nantong Zhiyun and would go on to establish himself as a regular as the team went on to gain promotion to the second tier at the end of the 2018 China League Two campaign. A constant regular within the team, he would help establish the club within the division and was part of the squad as they gained promotion to the top tier at the end of the 2022 China League One season.

== Career statistics ==
As of 31 December 2022.

Club	Season	League			Cup		Continental		Other		Total	
Club	Season	Division	Apps	Goals	Apps	Goals	Apps	Goals	Apps	Goals	Apps	Goals
Chongqing Lifan	2010	Chinese Super League	0	0	0	0	–		–		0	0
Chongqing Lifan	2011	China League One	0	0	2	0	–		–		2	0
Chongqing Lifan	2012	China League One	1	0	0	0	–		–		1	0
Chongqing Lifan	2013	China League One	0	0	0	0	–		–		0	0
Chongqing Lifan	2014	China League One	0	0	0	0	–		–		0	0
Chongqing Lifan	Total		1	0	2	0	0	0	0	0	3	0
Beijing IT (loan)	2013	China League One	0	0	1	0	–		–		1	0
Beijing IT (loan)	2014	China League One	17	1	1	0	–		–		18	1
Beijing IT (loan)	Total		17	1	2	0	0	0	0	0	19	1
Beijing IT	2015	China League One	26	1	1	0	–		–		27	1
Nantong Zhiyun	2016	China League Two	17	0	1	0	–		–		18	0
Nantong Zhiyun	2017	China League Two	20	0	2	0	–		–		22	0
Nantong Zhiyun	2018	China League Two	25	1	4	0	–		–		29	1
Nantong Zhiyun	2019	China League One	29	0	1	0	–		–		30	0
Nantong Zhiyun	2020	China League One	13	0	0	0	–		–		13	0
Nantong Zhiyun	2021	China League One	17	0	0	0	–		–		17	0
Nantong Zhiyun	2022	China League One	28	3	0	0	–		–		28	3
Nantong Zhiyun	2023	Chinese Super League	0	0	0	0	–		–		0	0
Nantong Zhiyun	Total		149	4	8	0	0	0	0	0	157	4
Career total			193	6	13	0	0	0	0	0	206	6
