= Yu Shuai =

Chinese association football player

Personal information
- Date of birth: 28 June 1989 (age 37)
- Place of birth: Qingdao, Shandong, China
- Height: 1.89 m (6 ft 2 in)
- Position: Central defender

Youth career
- –2012: Shandong Taishan

Senior career*
| Years | Team | Apps | (Gls) |
| 2012 | Shandong Taishan | 0 | (0) |
| 2012 | → Beijing Yitong Kuche (loan) | | |
| 2013–2017 | Shenzhen FC | 17 | (0) |
| 2016 | → Hebei Elite (loan) | 2 | (0) |
| 2018–2021 | Inner Mongolia Zhongyou | 46 | (2) |
| 2021 | Shaanxi Chang'an Athletic | 4 | (0) |
| 2022 | Heilongjiang Ice City | 0 | (0) |
| 2022 | Yunnan Yukun | 0 | (0) |
| 2023 | Tai'an Tiankuang | 7 | (0) |
- * Club domestic league appearances and goals as of 14:01, 26 April 2022 (UTC)

Yu Shuai (Chinese: 于帅; born 28 June 1989) is a Chinese footballer who plays as a central defender.

== Career statistics ==
=== Club ===
As of 27 July 2021.

| Club | Season | League | | | Cup | | Continental | | Other | | Total | |
| Club | Season | Division | Apps | Goals | Apps | Goals | Apps | Goals | Apps | Goals | Apps | Goals |
|---|---|---|---|---|---|---|---|---|---|---|---|---|
| Shandong Taishan | 2012 | Chinese Super League | 0 | 0 | 0 | 0 | – | | 0 | 0 | 0 | 0 |
| Shenzhen Ruby | 2013 | China League One | – | | 2 (Note: Appearances in the Chinese FA Cup) | 0 | – | | 0 | 0 | 2 | 0 |
| Shenzhen Ruby | 2014 | China League One | 1 | 0 | 1 | 0 | – | | 0 | 0 | 2 | 0 |
| Shenzhen Ruby | 2015 | China League One | 13 | 0 | 0 | 0 | – | | 0 | 0 | 13 | 0 |
| Shenzhen Ruby | 2016 | China League One | 3 | 0 | 1 | 0 | – | | 0 | 0 | 4 | 0 |
| Shenzhen Ruby | 2017 | China League One | 0 | 0 | 2 | 1 | – | | 0 | 0 | 2 | 1 |
| Shenzhen Ruby | Total | | 17 | 0 | 6 | 1 | 0 | 0 | 0 | 0 | 23 | 1 |
| Hebei Elite (loan) | 2016 | China League Two | 2 | 0 | 0 | 0 | – | | 0 | 0 | 2 | 0 |
| Inner Mongolia Zhongyou | 2018 | China League One | 18 | 0 | 1 | 0 | – | | 0 | 0 | 19 | 0 |
| Inner Mongolia Zhongyou | 2019 | China League One | 21 | 2 | 0 | 0 | – | | 0 | 0 | 21 | 2 |
| Inner Mongolia Zhongyou | 2020 | China League One | 7 | 0 | 0 | 0 | – | | 0 | 0 | 7 | 0 |
| Inner Mongolia Zhongyou | Total | | 46 | 2 | 1 | 0 | 0 | 0 | 0 | 0 | 47 | 2 |
| Shaanxi Chang'an Athletic | 2021 | China League One | 2 | 0 | 0 | 0 | – | | 0 | 0 | 2 | 0 |
| Career total | | | 60 | 1 | 5 | 0 | 0 | 0 | 2 | 0 | 67 | 1 |
