= Ovidio Guaita =

Italian journalist, photographer, and traveler

Ovidio Guaita is journalist, photographer and traveller. He has published over 30 books, in New York City, Rome, Paris, London, Riyadh. He works with the Faculty of Architecture of the University of Florence on research on the history of art and Islamic architecture. Since 2005 he is the Editor in Chief of Resorts Magazine, published in London by Palidano Press.

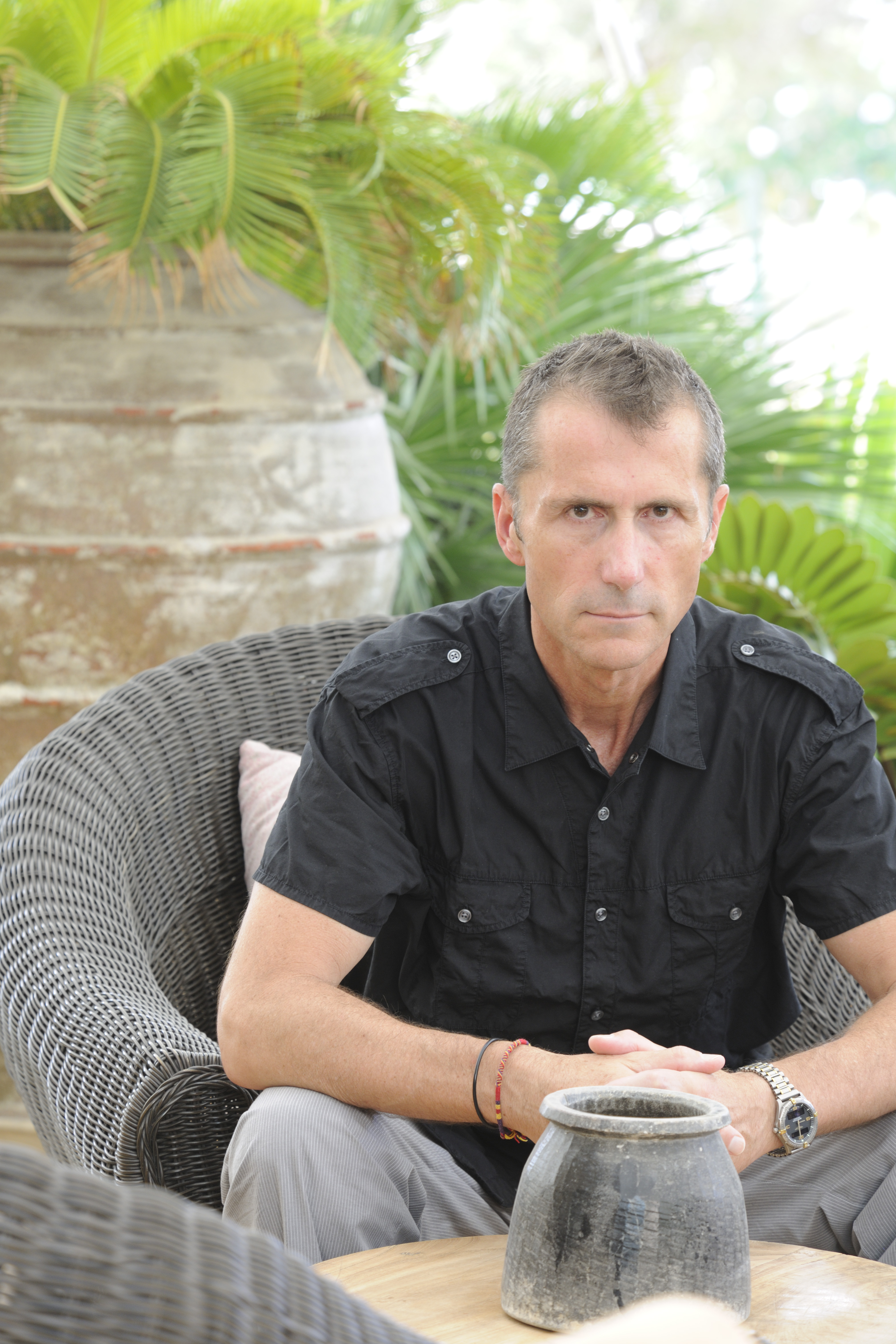
At Anantara Desert Resort in Sir Bani Yas Island, west Abu Dhabi.

== Publications ==
2016 Top Places to Stay in Saudi Arabia, London, Palidano Press.
2016 Top Italian Hotels & Resorts, London, Palidano Press.
2016 Top Italian Red Wines, London, Palidano Press.
2016 Top Italian Olive Oils, London, Palidano Press.
2015 Riyadh Hotels, Riyadh, High Commission of the Development of Arriyadh.
2014 Top 100 Resorts, Hong Kong, ArtPower.
2014 Azerbaigian. Fasti caucasici da Baku a Seki, London, Palidano Press.
2012 Top 100 Places to Stay in Florence & Nearby, London, Palidano Press.
2011 Saudi Arabia. Urban Heritage Treasures, London, Palidano Press.
2011 Top 100. The World's Most Beautiful Resorts, London, Palidano Press.
2009 Dreaming of Florence, (text by Barbara Milo Ohrbach), New York, Rizzoli New York.
2010 Turista sarà lei! Manuale semiserio per piccoli e grandi viaggiatori, London, Palidano Press.
2008 Giardini, Vercelli White Star.
2007 Fiori, Vercelli, White Star.
2005 Civiltà della villa, Bergamo, Bolis.
2003 Between Eden and Earth. Gardens of the Islamic World, (catalogue of the photographic exhibition 23 April-31 August), Kuala Lumpur, Islamic Arts Museum Malaysia.
2002 La villa in Italia, Bergamo, Bolis.
(English edition Italian Villas, New York, Abbeville Press, 2003).
2001 The Art of Living. Residential Architecture in the Islamic World, (catalogue of the photographic exhibition 26 March-26 June 2001), Kuala Lumpur, Islamic Arts Museum Malaysia.
2000 La villa in Europa, Milano, Leonardo Arte.
1999 La villa coloniale, Milano, Leonardo Arte.
(English edition On Distant Shores, New York, Monacelli Press, 1999).
(French edition La maison coloniale, Paris, Hazan, 1999).
1999 ABC del viaggiatore, Milano, Mondadori.
1998 Segni di villa, Milano, Mondadori.
(English edition Villa Details, London, Cartago, 2000).
(French edition Splendeur des villas, Paris, Seuil, 2000).
1998 Il giardino nel mondo, Milano, Leonardo Arte.
(English edition Terrestrial Paradises, New York, Monacelli Press, 1999).
1997 Le ville della Toscana, Roma, Newton & Compton.
1997 Professione fotoreporter freelance, Milano, Mondadori.
1996 Le ville di Firenze, Roma, Newton & Compton.
1996 Ville nel mondo, Milano, Electa-Elemond.
1995 Come entrare nel mondo della fotografia, Milano, FrancoAngeli.
1995 Ville e giardini storici in Italia, Milano, Electa.
1995 I giardini della Lombardia, Milano, Electa.
1994 Le ville della Lombardia, Milano, Electa.
1994 I teatri storici in Italia, Milano, Electa.
1993 Villa Strozzi a Begozzo, Firenze, Cesati.
1986 Bruno Cordati, edited by Antonio del Guercio, photos di Ovidio Guaita (catalogue of the exhibition in Palazzo Strozzi in Firenze, 15 January-16 February 1987), Firenze, Multigraphic.
1985 Il teatro di Vespasiano Gonzaga. Descrizione tecnica e Regesto, in Sabbioneta. Una stella una pianura, Milano, Cariplo.
1985 Il teatro di Sabbioneta, (with Stefano Mazzoni), Firenze, Leo S. Olschki.

== Photographic exhibitions ==
2001 The Art of Living. Residential Architecture in the Islamic World, Kuala Lumpur, Islamic Art Museum Malaysia.
2003 Between Eden & Earth. Gardens of the Islamic World, Kuala Lumpur, Islamic Art Museum Malaysia
2003 Le ragioni del viaggio, Firenze BZF
2004 Yemen. Sulla via carovaniera dell’incenso, Firenze, BZF
2006 Viaggi e Viaggiatori, Galleria il Bisonte, Firenze

== Awards ==
2005 Hilton Awards for Best Web Article (on Resorts Web Magazine)
