= Zhang Zhenqiang =

Chinese footballer

Zhang Zhenqiang 张振强
Personal information
- Date of birth: 28 January 1993 (age 33)
- Place of birth: Dalian, Liaoning, China
- Height: 1.90 m (6 ft 3 in)
- Position: Goalkeeper

Youth career
- Dalian Shide
- 2012: → Shanghai Shenxin (loan)

Senior career*
Years	Team	Apps	(Gls)
2011	Dalian Shide	0	(0)
2013–2015	Dalian Aerbin	0	(0)
2016–2019	Liaoning Whowin	48	(0)
2020–2022	Shijiazhuang Ever Bright	4	(0)
2022–2023	Wuhan Yangtze River	17	(0)
Total		69	(0)
- * Club domestic league appearances and goals as of 31 December 2022

Zhang Zhenqiang (Chinese: 张振强; pinyin: Zhāng Zhènqiáng; born 28 January 1993) is a Chinese football player.

On 10 September 2024, Chinese Football Association announced that Zhang was banned from football-related activities for lifetime for involving in match-fixing.

== Club career ==
Zhang Zhenqiang started his professional football career in 2011 when he was promoted to Chinese Super League side Dalian Shide's first team squad. He was loaned to Shanghai Shenxin in 2012 and played in the reserve team. When he returned Dalian Shide would be dissolved and merged with fellow Super League side Dalian Aerbin for the 2013 Chinese Super League campaign.

Zhang transferred to Chinese Super League side Liaoning Whowin in February 2016. On 18 September 2016, he made his senior debut in a 6–2 away defeat against Guangzhou Evergrande. He would unfortunately be part of the squad that was relegated at the end of the 2017 Chinese Super League campaign.

On 7 July 2020 he would transfer to newly promoted top tier club Shijiazhuang Ever Bright. He would make his debut on 19 September 2020 in a Chinese FA Cup game against Tianjin TEDA F.C. that ended in a 2-0 defeat.

== Career statistics ==
As of 31 December 2022.

Appearances and goals by club, season and competition
Club	Season	League			National Cup		Continental		Other		Total	
Club	Season	Division	Apps	Goals	Apps	Goals	Apps	Goals	Apps	Goals	Apps	Goals
Dalian Shide	2011	Chinese Super League	0	0	0	0	-		-		0	0
Dalian Aerbin	2013	Chinese Super League	0	0	0	0	-		-		0	0
Dalian Aerbin	2014	Chinese Super League	0	0	0	0	-		-		0	0
Dalian Aerbin	Total		0	0	0	0	0	0	0	0	0	0
Liaoning Whowin	2016	Chinese Super League	1	0	0	0	-		-		1	0
Liaoning Whowin	2017	Chinese Super League	6	0	1	0	-		-		7	0
Liaoning Whowin	2018	China League One	29	0	0	0	-		-		29	0
Liaoning Whowin	2019	China League One	12	0	0	0	-		0 (Note: Appearances in 2019 China League One relegation play-off games)	0	12	0
Liaoning Whowin	Total		48	0	0	0	0	0	0	0	49	0
Shijiazhuang Ever Bright	2020	Chinese Super League	3	0	1	0	-		-		4	0
Shijiazhuang Ever Bright	2021	Chinese Super League	1	0	0	0	-		-		1	0
Shijiazhuang Ever Bright	Total		4	0	1	0	0	0	0	0	5	0
Wuhan Yangtze River	2022	Chinese Super League	17	0	0	0	-		-		17	0
Career total			69	0	2	0	0	0	0	0	71	0
