= Wu Yake =

Chinese footballer

Wu Yake 吴亚轲
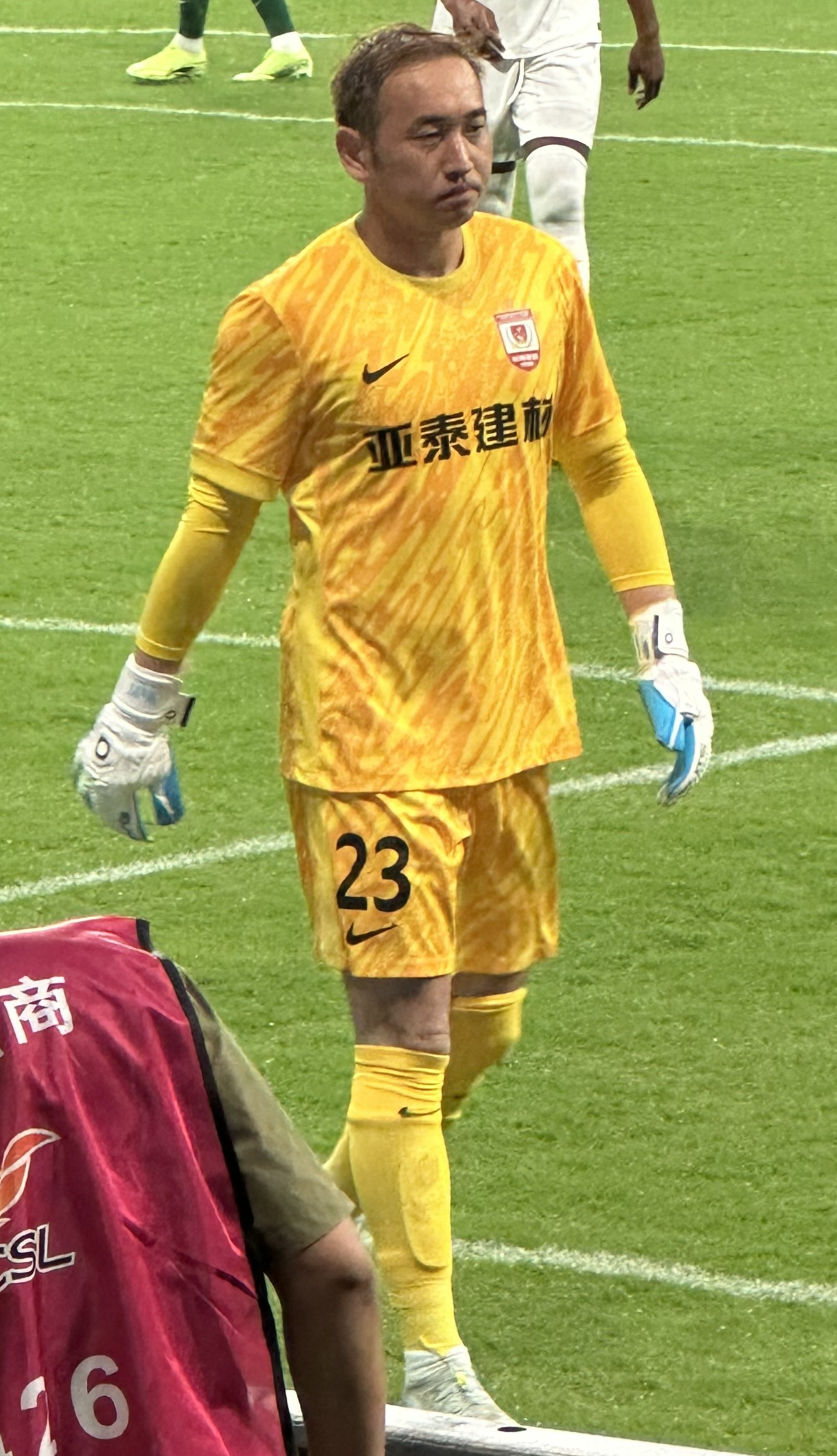
- Wu Yake playing for Changchun Yatai in June 2025

Personal information
- Date of birth: February 3, 1991 (age 35)
- Place of birth: Wuhan, Hubei, China
- Height: 1.86 m (6 ft 1 in)
- Position: Goalkeeper

Team information
- Current team: Changchun Yatai
- Number: 23

Youth career
- Changchun Yatai

Senior career*
Years	Team	Apps	(Gls)
2011–	Changchun Yatai	157	(0)
2012	→ Guizhou Zhicheng (loan)	24	(0)
- * Club domestic league appearances and goals as of 16 August 2025

Wu Yake (Chinese: 吴亚轲; born 3 February 1991 in Wuhan) is a Chinese professional footballer who currently plays as a goalkeeper for China League One club Changchun Yatai.

== Club career ==
In 2011, Wu Yake started his professional footballer career with Changchun Yatai in the Chinese Super League. In March 2012, Wu was loaned to China League Two side Guizhou Zhicheng until 31 December 2012. On 15 July 2015, Wu made his league debut for Changchun in a 2-1 home win against Liaoning Whowin.

Wu would go on to establish himself as Changchun's first choice goalkeeper until the 2018 Chinese Super League campaign when he would unfortunately be part of the squad that was relegated at the end of the season. He would subsequently be replaced by Shi Xiaotian as the club's first choice goalkeeper. He would still be part of the team that would go on to win the division title and promotion back into the top tier at the end of the 2020 league campaign.

With Changchun back within the top tier he would fight for the first choice goalkeeping position with Shi throughout the 2021 Chinese Super League season, which saw the club come fourth within the division. The following campaign saw Shi leave the club and Wu would establish himself once more as the team's first choice goalkeeper.

== Career statistics ==
Statistics accurate as of match played 16 August 2025.

Appearances and goals by club, season and competition
Club	Season	League			National Cup		Continental		Other		Total	
Club	Season	Division	Apps	Goals	Apps	Goals	Apps	Goals	Apps	Goals	Apps	Goals
Changchun Yatai	2011	Chinese Super League	0	0	0	0	-		-		0	0
Changchun Yatai	2013	Chinese Super League	0	0	0	0	-		-		0	0
Changchun Yatai	2014	Chinese Super League	0	0	0	0	-		-		0	0
Changchun Yatai	2015	Chinese Super League	11	0	1	0	-		-		12	0
Changchun Yatai	2016	Chinese Super League	18	0	1	0	-		-		19	0
Changchun Yatai	2017	Chinese Super League	24	0	0	0	-		-		24	0
Changchun Yatai	2018	Chinese Super League	7	0	1	0	-		-		8	0
Changchun Yatai	2019	China League One	0	0	3	0	-		-		3	0
Changchun Yatai	2020	China League One	0	0	2	0	-		-		2	0
Changchun Yatai	2021	Chinese Super League	6	0	0	0	-		-		6	0
Changchun Yatai	2022	Chinese Super League	21	0	0	0	-		-		21	0
Changchun Yatai	2023	Chinese Super League	30	0	1	0	-		-		31	0
Changchun Yatai	2024	Chinese Super League	19	0	0	0	-		-		19	0
Changchun Yatai	2025	Chinese Super League	21	0	0	0	-		-		21	0
Changchun Yatai	Total		157	0	9	0	0	0	0	0	166	0
Guizhou Zhicheng (loan)	2012	China League Two	24	0	1	0	-		-		25	0
Career total			181	0	10	0	0	0	0	0	191	0

== Honours ==
=== Club ===
Changchun Yatai

- China League One: 2020

Guizhou Zhicheng

- China League Two: 2012
