= Wang Hongliang =

Chinese footballer

Wang Hongliang 王洪亮
Personal information
- Date of birth: 14 January 1985 (age 41)
- Place of birth: Shanghai, China
- Height: 1.74 m (5 ft 9 in)
- Position: Midfielder

Youth career
- Shanghai 02
- 2002–2004: Shanghai Shenhua

Senior career*
Years	Team	Apps	(Gls)
2005–2010	Shanghai Shenhua	60	(1)
2011	Shenzhen Ruby	0	(0)
2012	Chongqing Lifan	2	(0)
2012	→Shanghai Shenhua (loan)	0	(0)
2013–2014	Shenzhen Ruby	43	(2)
2015-2017	Shanghai Jiading Boo King		

International career
2005	China U-20	2	(0)

Managerial career
- 2015-2021: Shanghai Jiading Boji (general manager)
- 2019: Shanghai Jiading Boji (interim)
- 2021-2022: Shanghai Jiading Huilong
- 2023-: China women U18
Medal record
Representing China
Men's football
AFC Youth Championship
Silver medal – second place	2004 َ Malaysia	Team
- * Club domestic league appearances and goals as of 11 November 2014

Wang Hongliang (Chinese: 王洪亮; pinyin: Wáng Hóngliàng) (born 14 January 1985) is a Chinese football coach and former football player as a midfielder.

== Club career ==
=== Shanghai Shenhua ===
Wang Hongliang started his football career with top tier side Shanghai Shenhua after he graduated from their youth team in the 2005 Chinese league season where he would make his debut against Changsha Ginde on 2 July 2005 which saw Shanghai win 6-1. Throughout the rest of the season Wang would be used sparsely to gain more playing time, his progression would continue throughout the rest of 2006 league season where he played a larger role throughout Shenhua's campaign and eventually played in fifteen league games throughout the campaign.

At the beginning of the 2007 league season the introduction of several midfielders from the emergence of Shanghai United saw many players dropped, yet despite a drop in playing time Wang was still able to make an impact by starting in several league games for Shanghai. With a fresh start at the beginning of the 2008 league season, which saw the overhaul of many players Wang could continue to remain as a squad player and predominantly be used as a substitute for Shenhua.

=== Shenzhen Ruby ===
The following seasons at Shenhua saw Wang unable to gain significantly more playing time and would go on to miss much of the 2010 league season through injury, this saw the club release Wang before he joined top tier club Shenzhen Ruby with team mate Chen Lei. His time at Shenzhen was a huge disappointment and due to a knee injury he missed the entire league season while the club were relegated, which ultimately saw the club decide to let Wang join second tier club Chongqing Lifan.
