= Tan Yang =

Chinese footballer

Tan Yang 谈杨
Personal information
- Date of birth: 9 January 1989 (age 37)
- Place of birth: Wuhan, Hubei, China
- Height: 1.96 m (6 ft 5 in)
- Positions: Striker; centre-back

Youth career
- 2003–2008: Zhejiang Greentown

Senior career*
Years	Team	Apps	(Gls)
2008–2013	Hangzhou Greentown	24	(3)
2012–2013	→ Hebei Zhongji (loan)	17	(6)
2013–2015	Mafra	17	(3)
2014	→ Farense (loan)	24	(5)
2015	→ Hebei Zhongji (loan)	6	(0)
2016–2021	Zhejiang FC	77	(9)

International career
2009–2010	China	2	(0)

Managerial career
- 2022–2023: Zhejiang FC (assistant)
- 2025: Zhejiang FC U21
- 2026–: Zhejiang FC U20
- * Club domestic league appearances and goals

Tan Yang (Chinese: 谈杨; pinyin: Tán Yáng; born 9 January 1989) is a Chinese former footballer who played as a striker and centre-back.

== Club career ==
Tan Yang started his football career when he joined Zhejiang Greentown's youth academy in 2003. He had a brief trial with Ligue 1 side Sochaux in February 2007. He made his debut for the club when he made his debut against Qingdao Jonoon on 5 April 2008 in a 2–0 loss. Often coming on as a substitute, he would nevertheless score two league goals throughout the campaign, with his debut goal coming against Changchun Yatai in a 2–2 draw on 12 November 2008. After several seasons for Hangzhou, he could not maintain a consistent run within the team, and he was released by the club at the end of the 2011 season. Halfway through the 2012 season, Hangzhou decided to bring back Tan and soon loaned him out to third-tier club Hebei Zhongji. Tan transferred to Hebei on a permanent deal in January 2013.

Tan signed a two-year contract with Campeonato Nacional de Seniores side C.D. Mafra on 24 July 2013. On 25 August 2013, he scored his first goal for his side in a match against Atlético Riachense which ended 2–0. On 1 July 2014, Tan transferred to Segunda Liga side S.C. Farense. He made his first appearance for the club on 16 November 2014 in a 2–2 draw against Desportivo Aves and also scored his first goal for the club in the same match. On 26 June 2015, Tan was loaned to China League One side Hebei Zhongji.

On 3 January 2016, Tan returned to Hangzhou Greentown. He would make his debut on 30 April 2016 in a league game against Henan Jianye that ended in a 1-0 defeat. This would be followed by his first goal for the club on 25 June 2016 in a league game against Hebei China Fortune FC that ended in a 1-0 victory. Unfortunately, he would be part of the squad that was relegated at the end of the season. He would go on to be converted into a centre-back and captain of the team before he would aid them to promotion to the top tier at the end of the 2021 campaign. He would retire from professional football after the 2021 season and move into coaching.

== Coaching career ==
On 11 February 2026, Tan was appointed as the head coach of Zhejiang FC U20.

== International career ==
Tan made his debut for the Chinese national team in a 3–1 win against Palestine on 18 July 2009, coming on as a substitute for Qu Bo.

== Career statistics ==
As of match played 27 April 2022

Appearances and goals by club, season and competition
Club	Season	League			National cup		Continental		Other		Total	
Club	Season	Division	Apps	Goals	Apps	Goals	Apps	Goals	Apps	Goals	Apps	Goals
Hangzhou Greentown	2008	Chinese Super League	7	2	–		–		–		7	2
Hangzhou Greentown	2009	Chinese Super League	9	0	–		–		–		9	0
Hangzhou Greentown	2010	Chinese Super League	5	1	–		–		–		5	1
Hangzhou Greentown	2011	Chinese Super League	3	0	0	0	1	0	–		4	0
Hangzhou Greentown	Total		24	3	0	0	1	0	0	0	25	3
Hebei Zhongji (loan)	2012	China League Two	11	6	0	0	–		–		11	6
Hebei Zhongji (loan)	2013	China League Two	6	0	1	0	–		–		7	0
Hebei Zhongji (loan)	Total		17	6	1	0	0	0	0	0	18	6
Mafra	2013–14	Campeonato de Portugal	17	3	3	1	–		–		20	4
Farense (loan)	2013–14	Segunda Liga	24	5	0	0	–		–		24	5
Hebei Zhongji (loan)	2015	China League One	6	0	1	0	–		–		7	0
Hangzhou Greentown	2016	Chinese Super League	18	2	1	0	–		–		19	2
Hangzhou Greentown	2017	China League One	8	1	1	0	–		–		9	1
Hangzhou Greentown	2018	China League One	19	1	1	0	–		–		20	1
Hangzhou Greentown	2019	China League One	19	3	1	1	–		–		20	4
Hangzhou Greentown	2020	China League One	13	2	0	0	–		0 (Note: Appearance(s) in CSL Relegation play-offs)	0	13	2
Hangzhou Greentown	2021	China League One	0	0	0	0	–		0	0	0	0
Hangzhou Greentown	Total		77	9	4	1	0	0	0	0	81	10
Career total			165	26	9	2	1	0	0	0	175	28
