= Carlos Ceballos =

Colombian footballer (born 1981)

Personal information
- Date of birth: 13 September 1981 (age 45)
- Place of birth: Cali, Colombia
- Height: 1.86 m (6 ft 1 in)
- Position: Forward

Senior career*
Years	Team	Apps	(Gls)
1999–2000	Atlético Rafaela	2	(0)
2000–2001	Deportes Tolima	22	(2)
2001	Cortuluá		
2001	Millonarios	12	(0)
2002–2004	Lota Schwager		
2005	ESPOLI	13	(2)
2005	Deportivo Pereira	1	(0)
2006	Deportes Quindío	7	(0)
2007–2008	Maccabi Ahi Nazareth	27	(5)
2008	FC Ashdod	3	(0)
2008	→ Hakoah Ramat Gan (loan)	10	(0)
2009	Once Caldas	24	(4)
2009	Jiangsu GS	0	(0)
2010	Cortuluá	7	(1)
2010–2011	Carabobo	23	(3)
2011–2012	Maccabi Ahi Nazareth	6	(2)
2012	Wuhan Zall	7	(0)
2013	Atlético Bucaramanga	12	(2)
2014–2015	Parrillas One	8	(0)
2015	UES	5	(1)
- * Club domestic league appearances and goals

Carlos Mario Ceballos Agualimpia, known simply as Carlos Ceballos (Latin American Spanish: [ˈkaɾlos seˈβaʎos]; born 13 September 1981, in Cali, Colombia) is a Colombian former professional footballer who played as a forward.

== Teams ==
- (Argentina) Atlético Rafaela 1999–2000
- (Colombia) Deportes Tolima 2000–2001
- (Colombia) Cortuluá 2001
- (Colombia) Millonarios 2001
- (Chile) Lota Schwager 2002–2004
- (Ecuador) ESPOLI 2005
- (Colombia) Deportivo Pereira 2005
- (Colombia) Deportes Quindío 2006
- (Israel) Maccabi Akhi Nazareth 2007–2008
- (Israel) FC Ashdod 2008
- (Israel) Hakoah Ramat Gan 2008
- (Colombia) Once Caldas 2009
- (China) Jiangsu Sainty 2009
- (Colombia) Cortuluá 2010
- (Venezuela) Carabobo 2010–2011
- (Israel) Maccabi Ahi Nazareth 2011–2012
- (China) Wuhan Zall 2012
- (Colombia) Atlético Bucaramanga 2013
- (Honduras) Parrillas One 2014
- (El Salvador) UES 2015
