= Zhao Yanming =

Chinese footballer

Zhao Yanming 赵燕明
Personal information
- Date of birth: January 16, 1981 (age 45)
- Place of birth: Tianjin, China
- Height: 1.85 m (6 ft 1 in)
- Position: Goalkeeper

Youth career
- 1998–2003: Tianjin Teda

Senior career*
Years	Team	Apps	(Gls)
2003–2012	Tianjin Teda	57	(0)
2013–2015	Tianjin Songjiang	21	(0)
2016–2017	Jiangsu Yancheng Dingli	35	(0)
- * Club domestic league appearances and goals as of 14 October 2017

Zhao Yanming (Chinese: 赵燕明; born January 16, 1981, in Tianjin) is a Chinese football player as a goalkeeper.

== Club career ==
Zhao Yanming began his football career playing for the Tianjin Teda's youth team before he eventually graduated permanently to the senior team by Giuseppe Materazzi in the 2003 league season where he spent the majority of the season playing as the team's third choice goalkeeper. For the next season he would work his way up as the team's second choice goalkeeper until Liu Yunfei left at the beginning of the 2006 league season to join Shanghai Shenhua, which left the goalkeeping spot up for grabs. The Tianjin coach Liu Chunming would let Zhao fight for the spot against fellow goalkeeper Tian Xu at the beginning of the season and on March 19, 2006, in the second league game of the season against Shenzhen Kingway Zhao was given his chance to establish himself within the team, which he did when he kept a clean sheet in a 3–0 victory. By the end of the season he was firmly established as the team's first choice goalkeeper and Tianjin finished sixth at the end of the season. Despite having a respectable campaign for a young goalkeeper the club brought in a new manager in Jozef Jarabinský as well as a new goalkeeper in Yang Jun who Jarabinský preferred. While Zhao may have been relegated back to the bench he stayed positive for the next several seasons until Arie Haan came to Tianjin as their manager at the beginning of the 2010 league season and promoted Zhao as the team's first choice goalkeeper once again after Yang Jun left the club after a contract dispute. Taking full advantage of his second opportunity Zhao would play through the whole campaign and help guide the club to a runners-up position at the end of the season.

In March 2016, Zhao transferred to China League Two side Jiangsu Yancheng Dingli.
