= Li Zhichao =

Chinese footballer

Li Zhichao 李智超
Personal information
- Full name: Li Zhichao
- Date of birth: February 18, 1989 (age 37)
- Place of birth: Dalian, Liaoning, China
- Height: 1.83 m (6 ft 0 in)
- Position: Midfielder

Youth career
- 2005–2007: Dalian Shide

Senior career*
Years	Team	Apps	(Gls)
2008	Dalian Shide Siwu	12	(0)
2008–2012	Dalian Shide	26	(1)
2012	→ Beijing Baxy (loan)	13	(5)
2013	Dalian Aerbin	0	(0)
2013	→ Lijiang Jiayunhao (loan)	7	(0)
2014	Beijing Baxy	27	(7)
2015	Henan Jianye	21	(2)
2016	Jiangsu Suning	13	(0)
2017–2019	Wuhan Zall	29	(0)
2022	Shaoxing Shangyu Pterosaur	3	(0)
- * Club domestic league appearances and goals as of 25 March 2025

Li Zhichao (Chinese: 李智超; pinyin: Li Zhìchāo) is a Chinese professional footballer who played as a midfielder.

== Club career ==
Li Zhichao would start his football career playing for the various Dalian Shide F.C. youth teams before he was loaned out to the teams satellite youth team called Dalian Shide Siwu FC that was allowed to take part in Singapore's 2008 S.League. Li would soon return to Dalian Shide and within the 2008 Chinese Super League season he would make his debut for the club on June 25, 2008, in a league game against Liaoning Whowin in a 2–1 victory. After that game he would predominantly be used as a substitute until June 18, 2011, saw him eventually score his first goal for the club in a league game against Tianjin Teda F.C. that ended in a 1–1 draw.

The following season Li would struggle to make more of an impact and was loaned out to second-tier club Beijing Baxy on May 5, 2012. When Li returned to Dalian Shide the club was taken over by local rivals Dalian Aerbin. With the enlarged squad Li saw no playing time at Dalian Aerbin and was loaned out to third tier club Lijiang Jiayunhao until in February 2014, Li transferred to China League One side Beijing Baxy.

On January 21, 2015, Li transferred to Chinese Super League side Henan Jianye. On February 24, 2016, Li transferred to fellow Chinese Super League side Jiangsu Suning. On April 2, 2016, he made his debut for Jiangsu in a 1–1 away draw against Hebei China Fortune, coming on as a substitute for Sammir in the injury time.

On February 14, 2017, Li transferred to League One side Wuhan Zall. The following season, Wuhan won the 2018 China League One division.

== Career statistics ==
Statistics accurate as of match played December 31, 2019.

Appearances and goals by club, season and competition
Club	Season	League			National Cup		League Cup		Continental		Total	
Club	Season	Division	Apps	Goals	Apps	Goals	Apps	Goals	Apps	Goals	Apps	Goals
Dalian Shide Siwu FC	2008	S.League	12	0	1	0	1	0	-		14	0
Dalian Shide	2008	Chinese Super League	5	0	-		-		-		5	0
Dalian Shide	2009	Chinese Super League	0	0	-		-		-		0	0
Dalian Shide	2010	Chinese Super League	9	0	-		-		-		9	0
Dalian Shide	2011	Chinese Super League	10	1	1	0	-		-		11	1
Dalian Shide	2012	Chinese Super League	3	0	0	0	-		-		3	0
Dalian Shide	Total		26	1	1	0	0	0	0	0	27	1
Beijing Baxy (loan)	2012	China League One	13	5	0	0	-		-		13	5
Lijiang Jiayunhao (loan)	2013	China League Two	7	0	-		-		-		7	0
Beijing Baxy	2014	China League One	27	7	0	0	-		-		27	7
Henan Jianye	2015	Chinese Super League	21	2	2	0	-		-		23	2
Jiangsu Suning	2016	Chinese Super League	13	0	0	0	-		0	0	13	0
Wuhan Zall	2017	China League One	25	0	0	0	-		-		25	0
Wuhan Zall	2018	China League One	4	0	2	0	-		-		6	0
Wuhan Zall	Total		29	0	2	0	0	0	0	0	31	0
Career total			149	15	6	0	1	0	0	0	156	15

== Honours ==
Wuhan Zall

- China League One: 2018
