= Guo Chunquan =

Chinese footballer (born 1985)

Guo Chunquan 郭纯全
Personal information
- Birth name: Guo Chunquan
- Date of birth: 2 January 1985 (age 41)
- Place of birth: Shenyang, Liaoning, China
- Height: 1.87 m (6 ft 1 1/2 in)
- Position: Goalkeeper

Senior career*
Years	Team	Apps	(Gls)
2004–2010	Shenyang Ginde	15	(0)
2011–2012	Tianjin Songjiang	2	(0)
2012	→ Shaanxi Daqin (loan)	4	(0)
2013–2014	Harbin Yiteng	21	(0)
2015	Henan Jianye	0	(0)
2016	Baotou Nanjiao	0	(0)
2017	Zhejiang Yiteng	26	(0)
2018–2019	Liaoning FC	2	(0)
2020	Zhejiang Yiteng	8	(0)
Total		78	(0)
- * Club domestic league appearances and goals

Guo Chunquan (Chinese: 郭纯全; born Guo Chunquan (Chinese: 郭纯泉); 2 January 1985) is a retired Chinese football goalkeeper.

On 10 September 2024, Chinese Football Association announced that Guo was banned from football-related activities for lifetime for involving in match-fixing.

== Club career ==
In 2004, Guo Chunquan would start his professional footballer career with Shenyang Ginde in the Chinese Super League. He would make his debut for Shenyang in a league game on 3 April 2005 against Beijing Guoan that ended in a 1-1 draw. This performance would see Guo become the club's first choice goalkeeper until on 2 July 2005 when he was at fault for conceding the first goal of a 6-1 defeat to Shanghai Shenhua in a league game. He would eventually be dropped to the bench and was transfer listed before the start of the 2008 league season where he remained until his contract expired.

In February 2011, Guo transferred to China League One side Tianjin Songjiang on a free transfer. In July 2012, he was to China League Two side Shaanxi Daqin until 31 December. In March 2013, Guo transferred to China League One side Harbin Yiteng. On 21 January 2015, Guo transferred to Chinese Super League side Henan Jianye. In March 2016, Guo transferred to China League Two side Baotou Nanjiao. On 18 January 2017, Guo returned to Yiteng FC.

On 28 February 2018, Guo transferred to Liaoning F.C.

== Career statistics ==
Appearances and goals by club, season and competition
Club	Season	League			National Cup		League Cup		Continental		Total	
Club	Season	Division	Apps	Goals	Apps	Goals	Apps	Goals	Apps	Goals	Apps	Goals
Shenyang Ginde	2004	Chinese Super League	0	0	0	0	0	0	-		0	0
Shenyang Ginde	2005	Chinese Super League	15	0	1	0	0	0	-		16	0
Shenyang Ginde	2006	Chinese Super League	0	0	0	0	-		-		0	0
Shenyang Ginde	2007	Chinese Super League	0	0	-		-		-		0	0
Shenyang Ginde	Total		15	0	1	0	0	0	0	0	16	0
Tianjin Songjiang	2011	China League One	2	0	0	0	-		-		2	0
Tianjin Songjiang	2012	China League One	0	0	0	0	-		-		0	0
Tianjin Songjiang	Total		2	0	0	0	0	0	0	0	2	0
Shaanxi Daqin	2012	China League Two	4	0	0	0	-		-		4	0
Harbin Yiteng	2013	China League One	7	0	0	0	-		-		7	0
Harbin Yiteng	2014	Chinese Super League	14	0	1	0	-		-		15	0
Harbin Yiteng	Total		21	0	1	0	0	0	0	0	22	0
Henan Jianye	2015	Chinese Super League	0	0	0	0	-		-		0	0
Baotou Nanjiao	2016	China League Two	0	0	0	0	-		-		0	0
Zhejiang Yiteng	2017	China League One	26	0	1	0	-		-		27	0
Liaoning F.C.	2018	China League One	1	0	2	0	-		-		3	0
Liaoning F.C.	2019	China League One	1	0	2	0	-		-		3	0
Liaoning F.C.	Total		2	0	4	0	0	0	0	0	6	0
Zhejiang Yiteng	2020	China League Two	8	0	-		-		-		8	0
Career total			78	0	7	0	0	0	0	0	85	0
