= Ygor (footballer, born 1986) =

Brazilian footballer

Personal information
- Full name: Ygor de Souza
- Date of birth: July 27, 1986 (age 40)
- Place of birth: Santos, Brazil
- Height: 1.84 m (6 ft 1/2 in)
- Position: Striker

Senior career*
Years	Team	Apps	(Gls)
?	Cruzeiro (MG	?	(?)
?	XV de Jaú	?	(?)
?	Mogi das Cruzes	?	(8)
?	Volyn Lutsk	?	(?)
2010	Osvaldo Cruz	?	(5)
2010/2011	Gloria Bistriţa	12	(6)
2012	Chengdu Blades	10	(0)
2013	Nakhon Ratchasima F.C.	8	(4)
- * Club domestic league appearances and goals as of 21 July 2010 ‡ National team caps and goals as of 22:04, 21 July 2010

Ygor Tadeu de Souza (born July 27, 1986, in Santos), commonly known as Ygor, is a Brazilian striker who has recently played for Chengdu Blades in the China League One.
