= Wang Xiao (footballer, born 1992) =

Chinese footballer

Wang Xiao 王啸
Personal information
- Date of birth: April 18, 1992 (age 34)
- Place of birth: Anshan, Liaoning, China
- Height: 1.92 m (6 ft 3 1/2 in)
- Position: Forward

Team information
- Current team: Guizhou Zhucheng Athletic
- Number: 32

Youth career
- Luneng Taishan Football School

Senior career*
Years	Team	Apps	(Gls)
2011–2012	Shenzhen Ruby	3	(0)
2012	→ Guizhou Zhicheng (loan)	5	(0)
2013–2015	Hangzhou Greentown	1	(0)
2016	Baotou Nanjiao	18	(3)
2017–2019	Yinchuan Helanshan	75	(16)
2020–2021	Xiamen Egret Island	15	(5)
2022-2023	Yuxi Yukun	10	(5)
2024-	Guizhou Zhucheng Athletic	33	(7)
- * Club domestic league appearances and goals as of 16 May 2022

Wang Xiao (simplified Chinese: 王啸; traditional Chinese: 王嘯; pinyin: Wáng Xiào; born 18 April 1992 in Anshan, Liaoning, China) is a Chinese footballer currently playing for Chinese club Guizhou Zhucheng Athletic as a forward.

== Club career ==
After playing in the youth squad of Shandong Luneng Taishan, Wang transferred to Chinese Super League side Shenzhen Ruby in 2011. He was loaned to China League Two club Guizhou Zhicheng in July 2012. He made 5 appearances in League Two as Guizhou Zhicheng finished first place in the League Two and won promotion back to the top flight at the first attempt. Wang made a free transfer to Hangzhou Greentown on 19 January 2013.

In March 2016, Wang transferred to China League Two side Baotou Nanjiao. On 26 December 2016, Wang moved to fellow League Two side Yinchuan Helanshan.

== Career statistics ==
Statistics accurate as of match played 12 October 2019.

Club performance			League		Cup		League Cup		Continental		Total	
Season	Club	League	Apps	Goals	Apps	Goals	Apps	Goals	Apps	Goals	Apps	Goals
China PR			League		FA Cup		CSL Cup		Asia		Total	
2011	Shenzhen Ruby	Chinese Super League	0	0	0	0	-		-		0	0
2012	Shenzhen Ruby	China League One	3	0	0	0	-		-		3	0
2012	Guizhou Zhicheng	China League Two	5	0	0	0	-		-		5	0
2013	Hangzhou Greentown	Chinese Super League	1	0	0	0	-		-		1	0
2015	Hangzhou Greentown	Chinese Super League	0	0	2	0	-		-		2	0
2016	Baotou Nanjiao	China League Two	18	3	1	0	-		-		19	3
2017	Yinchuan Helanshan	China League Two	21	5	1	0	-		-		22	5
2018	Yinchuan Helanshan	China League Two	27	8	2	0	-		-		29	8
2019	Yinchuan Helanshan	China League Two	27	3	1	0	-		-		28	3
Total	China PR		102	19	7	0	0	0	0	0	109	19

== Honours ==
Guizhou Zhicheng

- China League Two: 2012
