= Sang Yifei =

Chinese footballer

Sang Yifei 桑一非
Personal information
- Date of birth: 18 February 1989 (age 37)
- Place of birth: Kaifeng, Henan, China
- Height: 1.72 m (5 ft 7 1/2 in)
- Position: Midfielder

Youth career
- Beijing Guoan

Senior career*
Years	Team	Apps	(Gls)
2007–2010	Beijing Guoan	0	(0)
2011–2014	Wuhan Zall	42	(2)
2012–2013	→ Beijing IT (loan)	43	(2)
2015	Tianjin Teda	1	(0)
2016	Hebei China Fortune	0	(0)
2017–2020	Liaoning Whowin	77	(9)
2020–2022	Wuhan Three Towns	55	(12)
2023	Ji'nan Xingzhou	6	(0)
- * Club domestic league appearances and goals as of 11 January 2023

Sang Yifei (Chinese: 桑一非; born 18 February 1989 in Kaifeng) is a Chinese former footballer who played as midfielder.

== Club career ==
Sang started his professional career with Chinese Super League side Beijing Guoan in 2007. In March 2011, Sang transferred to China League One side Wuhan Zall. In June 2012, he moved to China League One side Beijing BIT on a two-year loan deal.

On 27 February 2015, Sang moved to Chinese Super League side Tianjin Teda on a free transfer. On 8 March 2015, Sang made his debut for Tianjin Teda in the 2015 Chinese Super League against Henan Jianye, coming on as a substitute for Guo Hao in the 72nd minute. He would not make any further first team appearances and was allowed to join another top tier club in Hebei China Fortune. Once again he struggled to establish himself and on 4 January 2017, Sang moved to fellow Super League side Liaoning Whowin. While this time he was able to break into the first team, unfortunately he would be part of the squad that was relegated at the end of the 2017 Chinese Super League season.

Sang became free agent as Liaoning F.C. got disbanded in May 2020. On 8 August 2020, he signed with Wuhan Three Towns. In his first season with the club he would go on to aid them in winning the division title and promotion into the second tier. This would be followed by another division title win and promotion as the club entered the top tier for the first tine in their history. The following campaign he would be part of the squad that won the 2022 Chinese Super League title.

On 21 May 2026, Sang was given a 5-year ban for match-fixing by the Chinese Football Association.

== Career statistics ==
Statistics accurate as of match played 11 January 2023.

Appearances and goals by club, season and competition
Club	Season	League			National Cup		Continental		Other		Total	
Club	Season	Division	Apps	Goals	Apps	Goals	Apps	Goals	Apps	Goals	Apps	Goals
Beijing Guoan	2007	Chinese Super League	0	0	-		-		-		0	0
Beijing Guoan	2008	Chinese Super League	0	0	-		-		-		0	0
Beijing Guoan	2009	Chinese Super League	0	0	-		-		-		0	0
Beijing Guoan	2010	Chinese Super League	0	0	-		-		-		0	0
Beijing Guoan	Total		0	0	0	0	0	0	0	0	0	0
Wuhan Zall	2011	China League One	17	0	0	0	-		-		17	0
Wuhan Zall	2012	China League One	1	0	0	0	-		-		1	0
Wuhan Zall	2014	China League One	24	2	0	0	-		-		24	2
Wuhan Zall	Total		42	2	0	0	0	0	0	0	42	2
Beijing BIT (loan)	2012	China League One	15	0	0	0	-		-		15	0
Beijing BIT (loan)	2013	China League One	28	2	1	0	-		-		29	2
Beijing BIT (loan)	Total		43	2	1	0	0	0	0	0	44	2
Tianjin Teda	2015	Chinese Super League	1	0	1	0	-		-		2	0
Hebei China Fortune	2016	Chinese Super League	0	0	0	0	-		-		0	0
Liaoning Whowin	2017	Chinese Super League	22	0	0	0	-		-		22	0
Liaoning Whowin	2018	China League One	26	2	2	0	-		-		28	2
Liaoning Whowin	2019	China League One	29	7	0	0	-		2 (Note: Appearance(s) in CL1 Relegation play-offs)	0	31	7
Liaoning Whowin	Total		77	9	2	0	0	0	2	0	81	9
Wuhan Three Towns	2020	China League Two	12	4	-		-		-		12	4
Wuhan Three Towns	2021	China League One	29	7	0	0	-		-		29	7
Wuhan Three Towns	2022	Chinese Super League	14	1	0	0	-		-		14	1
Wuhan Three Towns	Total		55	12	0	0	0	0	0	0	55	12
Career total			218	25	4	0	0	0	2	0	224	25

== Honours ==
=== Club ===
Wuhan Three Towns

- Chinese Super League: 2022.
- China League One: 2021
- China League Two: 2020
