= Leandro Guaita =

Argentine footballer

Personal information
- Date of birth: 19 May 1986 (age 40)
- Place of birth: La Plata, Argentina
- Height: 1.70 m (5 ft 7 in)
- Position: Winger

Team information
- Current team: Lavello

Youth career
- Estudiantes
- 2004–2005: FC Basel

Senior career*
Years	Team	Apps	(Gls)
2003–2004	Estudiantes		
2005–2006	Vicenza	0	(0)
2006	Sapri	10	(3)
2007–2008	Nuorese	38	(3)
2008–2009	Alghero	15	(0)
2009	San Marino	17	(0)
2009–2010	Poggibonsi	13	(3)
2010–2011	Virtus Casarano		(2)
2011–2012	Independiente José Terán	18	(1)
2012	SV Wehen Wiesbaden	1	(0)
2012	SV Wehen Wiesbaden II	1	(0)
2012	Shenzhen Ruby	11	(1)
2013–2014	Victoria	21	(6)
2014–2015	Estudiantes San Luis	6	(0)
2015	CD Vida	13	(2)
2015–2016	Albalonga	17	(2)
2016	Pol. Arzachena	13	(2)
2016–2019	Potenza	81	(19)
2019–2021	Taranto	50	(4)
2021–2022	Potenza	18	(1)
2022–	Lavello	2	(0)
- * Club domestic league appearances and goals as of 18 September 2022

Leandro Guaita (Spanish pronunciation: [leˈandɾo ˈɣwajta]; (Note: In isolation, Guaita is pronounced [ˈɡwajta].) born 19 May 1986) is an Argentine professional footballer who plays as a winger in Italy for Serie D club Lavello.

== Club career ==
Born in La Plata, Guaita started his career with local club Estudiantes in 2003. He transferred to Swiss football club FC Basel in 2004 and moved to Serie B side Vicenza Calcio in 2005. However, Guaita did not establish himself in the club and played for some lower-level clubs in Italy between 2006 and 2010, such as S.S.D. Sapri Calcio, U.S.D. Nuorese Calcio, Polisportiva Alghero, San Marino Calcio, U.S. Poggibonsi and A.S.D. Virtus Casarano.

In the summer of 2011, Guaita signed a contract with Ecuadorian Serie A side Independiente José Terán. He made 18 league appearances in the Second stage of the season, scoring one goal, helping the club avoid relegation. Guaita moved to 3. Liga club SV Wehen Wiesbaden in January 2012. He made his debut on 24 January in a 1–1 draw against SV Werder Bremen II, coming on as a substitute for Jonne Hjelm in the 69th minute. Guaita played only one match for the first team and one game for the second team in the Hessenliga. On 20 March, Guaita had his contract terminated by mutual consent.

On 12 July 2012, Guaita signed a half-year deal with China League One side Shenzhen Ruby by manager Philippe Troussier. He made his League One debut on 21 July in a 1–0 home win against Tianjin Songjiang, coming on as a substitute for Takashi Rakuyama by the end of the match. Mainly used as a substitute by Shenzhen Ruby, Guaita made 11 appearances in 2012 season and scored a goal. He was released by Shenzhen at the end of the season.

On 20 July 2019, he joined Taranto in Serie D.
