= Tang Xin =

Chinese footballer

Tang Xin 唐鑫
Personal information
- Full name: Tang Xin
- Date of birth: 16 October 1990 (age 36)
- Place of birth: Dalian, Liaoning, China
- Height: 1.78 m (5 ft 10 in)
- Position: Left-back

Team information
- Current team: Hubei Istar
- Number: 3

Youth career
- 2002–2010: Beijing Guoan
- 2014–2015: Guangzhou R&F

Senior career*
Years	Team	Apps	(Gls)
2006	Liaoning Zhongba	0	(0)
2010	Beijing Guoan Talent	5	(1)
2012	Jiangxi Liansheng	16	(0)
2013	Qinghai Senke		
2016–2020	Guizhou Hengfeng	101	(0)
2021–2025	Chengdu Rongcheng	66	(1)
2026–	Hubei Istar	0	(0)
- * Club domestic league appearances and goals as of 30 August 2025

Tang Xin (Chinese: 唐鑫; pinyin: Táng Xīn; born 16 October 1990) is a Chinese footballer who plays as a right-footed left-back for China League Two club Hubei Istar.

== Club career ==
Tang Xin joined Beijing Guoan's youth academy at the age of twelve along with twin younger brother Tang Miao in 2002. He was registered with China League Two side Liaoning Zhongba for the 2006 season. He was loaned to Beijing Guoan's satellite team Beijing Guoan Talent, which would play as a foreign team in Singapore's S. League in the 2010 season. Tang was on the bench for most time of the season. On 27 September 2010, he made his senior debut against Gombak United, coming on for Li Tixiang in the half time, as the result that some Beijing players was banned for participating a brawl in a league match against Young Lions. Tang scored his first goal in the match, which resulted in a 1–1 draw. He was released by Beijing Guoan at the end of the season.

Tang joined China League Two side Jiangxi Liansheng in 2012 after he recovered from ankle surgery. He transferred to fellow League Two club Qinghai Senke in 2013. Tang received a trial with Guangzhou R&F at the recommendation of Tang Miao, whom played as a regular right-back at the club, and joined R&F's reserved team in 2014.

Tang transferred to China League One side Guizhou Hengfeng Zhicheng in 2016. He made his debut for Guizhou on 19 March 2016 in a 3–1 away defeat against Qingdao Huanghai. He played 23 matches in the 2016 season as Guizhou Zhicheng finished the runners-up of the league and won promotion to Chinese Super League. On 28 April 2017, he made his Super League debut in a 3–1 away victory against Guangzhou R&F, contesting with Tang Miao. The match marked the first time twin brothers had played for opposing teams in the Chinese Super League.

After having spent five seasons at Guizhou and playing over 100 games for them, Tang would join Chengdu Rongcheng on 12 April 2021 on a free transfer. He made his debut for the club in a league game on 21 September 2021 against Beijing Institute of Technology in a 2-0 victory. He would establish himself as a regular within the team and aid the club to promotion to the top tier at the end of the 2021 league campaign. On 19 January 2026, the club announced his departure after the 2025 season.

== Career statistics ==
As of match played 30 August 2025.

Appearances and goals by club, season and competition
Club	Season	League			National Cup		League Cup		Continental		Other		Total	
Club	Season	Division	Apps	Goals	Apps	Goals	Apps	Goals	Apps	Goals	Apps	Goals	Apps	Goals
Liaoning Zhongba	2006	China League Two	0	0	-		-		-		-		0	0
Beijing Guoan Talent	2010	S. League	5	1	0	0	0	0	-		-		5	1
Jiangxi Liansheng	2012	China League Two	16	0	-		-		-		-		16	0
Qinghai Senke	2013	China League Two			0	0	-		-		-			
Guizhou Hengfeng	2016	China League One	23	0	0	0	-		-		-		23	0
Guizhou Hengfeng	2017	Chinese Super League	22	0	0	0	-		-		-		22	0
Guizhou Hengfeng	2018	Chinese Super League	19	0	4	1	-		-		-		23	1
Guizhou Hengfeng	2019	China League One	24	0	1	0	-		-		-		25	0
Guizhou Hengfeng	2020	China League One	13	0	1	0	-		-		-		14	0
Guizhou Hengfeng	Total		101	0	6	1	0	0	0	0	0	0	107	1
Chengdu Rongcheng	2021	China League One	8	0	2	0	-		-		2 (Note: Appearance(s) in CSL Relegation play-offs)	0	12	0
Chengdu Rongcheng	2022	Chinese Super League	20	0	0	0	-		-		-		20	0
Chengdu Rongcheng	2023	Chinese Super League	24	1	1	0	-		-		-		25	1
Chengdu Rongcheng	2024	Chinese Super League	10	0	2	0	-		-		-		12	0
Chengdu Rongcheng	2025	Chinese Super League	2	0	1	0	-		0	0	-		3	0
Chengdu Rongcheng	Total		64	1	6	0	0	0	0	0	2	0	72	1
Career total			186	2	12	1	0	0	0	0	2	0	200	3
