= Dong Hang =

Chinese association football player

Personal information
- Date of birth: 21 May 1993 (age 33)
- Place of birth: Beijing, China
- Height: 1.85 m (6 ft 1 in)
- Position: Goalkeeper

Team information
- Current team: Qingdao West Coast
- Number: 37

Youth career
- –2012: Qinghai Senke
- 2013: Shanghai Shenhua

Senior career*
| Years | Team | Apps | (Gls) |
| 2013–2014 | Shanghai Shenhua | 0 | (0) |
| 2013 | → Dali Ruilong (loan) | ? | (0) |
| 2015 | Changchun Shenhua | - | (-) |
| 2017–2018 | Hunan Billows | 11 | (0) |
| 2019–2023 | Beijing BSU | 44 | (0) |
| 2020 | → Hunan Billows (loan) | 6 | (0) |
| 2023 | Hunan Billows | 8 | (0) |
| 2023 | Qingdao West Coast | 1 | (0) |
| 2024 | Cangzhou Mighty Lions | 0 | (0) |
| 2025– | Qingdao West Coast | 0 | (0) |
- * Club domestic league appearances and goals as of 14:01, 29 March 2024 (UTC)

Dong Hang (Chinese: 东航; born 21 May 1993) is a Chinese footballer who plays as a goalkeeper for Qingdao West Coast.

== Career statistics ==
=== Club ===
As of 29 March 2024.

| Club | Season | League | | | Cup | | Other | | Total | |
| Club | Season | Division | Apps | Goals | Apps | Goals | Apps | Goals | Apps | Goals |
|---|---|---|---|---|---|---|---|---|---|---|
| Shanghai Shenhua | 2013 | Chinese Super League | 0 | 0 | 0 | 0 | 0 | 0 | 0 | 0 |
| Shanghai Shenhua | 2014 | Chinese Super League | 0 | 0 | 0 | 0 | 0 | 0 | 0 | 0 |
| Shanghai Shenhua | Total | | 0 | 0 | 0 | 0 | 0 | 0 | 0 | 0 |
| Dali Ruilong (loan) | 2013 | China League Two | ? | 0 | ? | 0 | 0 | 0 | ? | 0 |
| Changchun Shenhua | 2015 | CAL | - | | - | | - | | - | |
| Hunan Billows | 2017 | China League Two | 11 | 0 | 0 | 0 | 0 | 0 | 11 | 0 |
| Hunan Billows | 2018 | China League Two | 0 | 0 | 0 | 0 | 1 (Note: Appearances in the China League Two playoffs) | 0 | 1 | 0 |
| Hunan Billows | Total | | 11 | 0 | 0 | 0 | 1 | 0 | 12 | 0 |
| Beijing BSU | 2019 | China League One | 0 | 0 | 0 | 0 | 0 | 0 | 0 | 0 |
| Beijing BSU | 2021 | China League One | 10 | 0 | 1 | 0 | 0 | 0 | 11 | 0 |
| Beijing BSU | 2022 | China League One | 34 | 0 | 0 | 0 | 0 | 0 | 34 | 0 |
| Beijing BSU | Total | | 44 | 0 | 1 | 0 | 0 | 0 | 45 | 0 |
| Hunan Billows (loan) | 2020 | China League Two | 6 | 0 | 0 | 0 | 0 | 0 | 6 | 0 |
| Hunan Billows | 2023 | China League Two | 8 | 0 | 3 | 0 | 0 | 0 | 11 | 0 |
| Qingdao West Coast | 2023 | China League One | 1 | 0 | 0 | 0 | 0 | 0 | 1 | 0 |
| Career total | | | 70 | 0 | 4 | 0 | 1 | 0 | 75 | 0 |
