= Wang Jianwen =

Chinese association football player

Personal information
- Date of birth: 6 January 1988 (age 38)
- Place of birth: Qingdao, Shandong, China
- Height: 1.82 m (6 ft 0 in)
- Position: Midfielder

Team information
- Current team: Jiangxi Lushan
- Number: 26

Senior career*
| Years | Team | Apps | (Gls) |
| 2006 | Qingdao Jonoon | 0 | (0) |
| 2007–2010 | Shanghai Zobon | 74 | (16) |
| 2011 | Guizhou Zhicheng | 24 | (0) |
| 2012 | Kunming Ruilong | 14 | (2) |
| 2013–2015 | Jiangxi Liansheng | 44 | (9) |
| 2016 | Qingdao Jonoon | 28 | (5) |
| 2017–2020 | Beijing Enterprises Group | 80 | (20) |
| 2020–2021 | Qingdao FC | 10 | (0) |
| 2021 | → Shaanxi Chang'an Athletic (loan) | 16 | (0) |
| 2022-2023 | Qingdao Red Lions | 25 | (3) |
| 2024- | Jiangxi Lushan | 18 | (1) |
- * Club domestic league appearances and goals as of 14:01, 6 May 2022 (UTC)

Wang Jianwen (Chinese: 王建文; born 6 January 1988) is a Chinese footballer who plays as a midfielder for Jiangxi Lushan.

== Club career ==
Wang Jianwen would start his career with top-tier club Qingdao Jonoon in the 2006 Chinese Super League season, however he was unable to make an appearance and was allowed to leave the club to join second-tier club Shanghai Zobon. With Shanghai he would go on to establish himself as a regular within the team, making 74 appearances and scoring 16 goals before he joined Guizhou Zhicheng for the 2011 China League One season. His move to Guizhou would see himself establish as a regular within the team, but he was relegated with them at the end of the season and was allowed to join Kunming Ruilong after only one season.

Wang would join third-tier football club Jiangxi Liansheng and establish himself as a regular within the team before he would revive his career by winning the 2014 China League Two division with them. The club would only spend one season within the second tier before experiencing relegation at the end of the 2015 China League One campaign. Despite this on 15 February 2016 Qingdao Jonoon, now in the second tier wanted Wang to rejoin the club for the 2016 China League One campaign. His return to his old club was not a success and despite personally establishing himself as a vital member of their team he was unable to help them avoid relegation.

On 7 February 2017 he would join Beijing Enterprises Group. With them he would make 82 appearances and score 20 goals, which saw newly promoted club to the top tier Qingdao Huanghai signed him on 15 July 2020. He would make his debut for the club and his first Chinese Super League appearance on 25 July 2020 against Wuhan Zall in a 2–0 defeat.

== Career statistics ==
As of 31 December 2020.

| Club | Season | League | | | Cup | | Continental | | Other | | Total | |
| Club | Season | Division | Apps | Goals | Apps | Goals | Apps | Goals | Apps | Goals | Apps | Goals |
|---|---|---|---|---|---|---|---|---|---|---|---|---|
| Qingdao Jonoon | 2006 | Chinese Super League | 0 | 0 | 0 | 0 | – | | 0 | 0 | 0 | 0 |
| Shanghai Zobon | 2007 | China League One | 13 | 1 | – | | – | | 0 | 0 | 13 | 1 |
| Shanghai Zobon | 2008 | China League One | 20 | 6 | – | | – | | 0 | 0 | 20 | 6 |
| Shanghai Zobon | 2009 | China League One | 22 | 5 | – | | – | | 0 | 0 | 22 | 5 |
| Shanghai Zobon | 2010 | China League One | 19 | 4 | – | | – | | 0 | 0 | 19 | 4 |
| Shanghai Zobon | Total | | 74 | 16 | 0 | 0 | 0 | 0 | 0 | 0 | 74 | 16 |
| Guizhou Zhicheng | 2011 | China League One | 24 | 0 | 1 (Note: Appearances in the Chinese FA Cup) | 0 | – | | 0 | 0 | 25 | 0 |
| Kunming Ruilong | 2012 | China League Two | 14 | 2 | 0 | 0 | – | | 0 | 0 | 14 | 2 |
| Jiangxi Liansheng | 2013 | China League Two | 10 | 3 | 0 | 0 | – | | 0 | 0 | 10 | 3 |
| Jiangxi Liansheng | 2014 | China League Two | 15 | 3 | 2 | 0 | – | | 0 | 0 | 17 | 3 |
| Jiangxi Liansheng | 2015 | China League One | 19 | 3 | 2 | 0 | – | | 0 | 0 | 21 | 3 |
| Jiangxi Liansheng | Total | | 44 | 9 | 4 | 0 | 0 | 0 | 0 | 0 | 48 | 9 |
| Qingdao Jonoon | 2016 | China League One | 28 | 5 | 0 | 0 | – | | 0 | 0 | 28 | 5 |
| Beijing Enterprises Group | 2017 | China League One | 30 | 10 | 1 | 0 | – | | 0 | 0 | 31 | 10 |
| Beijing Enterprises Group | 2018 | China League One | 27 | 8 | 0 | 0 | – | | 0 | 0 | 27 | 8 |
| Beijing Enterprises Group | 2019 | China League One | 23 | 2 | 1 | 0 | – | | 0 | 0 | 24 | 2 |
| Beijing Enterprises Group | Total | | 80 | 20 | 2 | 0 | 0 | 0 | 0 | 0 | 82 | 20 |
| Qingdao Huanghai | 2020 | Chinese Super League | 10 | 0 | 0 | 0 | – | | 0 | 0 | 10 | 0 |
| Career total | | | 274 | 52 | 6 | 0 | 0 | 0 | 0 | 0 | 280 | 52 |

== Honours ==
=== Club ===
Jiangxi Liansheng

- China League Two: 2014
