= Liu Bo =

Chinese footballer

Liu Bo 刘博
Personal information
- Date of birth: July 27, 1984 (age 42)
- Place of birth: Liaoning
- Height: 1.86 m (6 ft 1 in)
- Position: Defender

Youth career
- Guangdong Hongyuan

Senior career*
Years	Team	Apps	(Gls)
2003–2005	Dongguan Nancheng	8	(0)
2006–2009	Hangzhou Greentown	13	(0)
2007	→ Guangxi Tianji (loan)	?	(1)
2008	→ Sichuan (loan)	7	(1)
2010–2014	Hunan Billows	35	(1)
2012	→ Hubei China-Kyle (loan)	25	(1)
- * Club domestic league appearances and goals

Liu Bo (simplified Chinese: 刘博; traditional Chinese: 劉博; pinyin: liú bó; born 27 July 1984 in Liaoning) is a Chinese professional association football player.

== Club career ==
Liu started his senior career with Dongguan Nancheng in Hong Kong First Division League in 2003. He transferred to Zhejiang Greentown in 2006 but did not establish himself in the club. He was loaned to Guangxi Tianji in China League Two and Sichuan FC in China League One the next two seasons. He eventually made his debut for Hangzhou in a Chinese Super League game on 11 April 2009, in a 3-2 home win over Guangzhou Pharmaceutical.

In February 2010, Liu decided to move to second tier club Hunan Billows.

On 13 February 2018, Liu was banned for five months from 27 January 2018 to 26 June 2018 for age falsification.
