= Huo Liang (footballer) =

Chinese association football player

Personal information
- Date of birth: 15 October 1989 (age 37)
- Place of birth: Dalian
- Height: 1.81 m (5 ft 11 in)
- Position: Full-back

Team information
- Current team: Meizhou Hakka
- Number: 18

Senior career*
Years	Team	Apps	(Gls)
2012-2013	Qinghai Senke		
2015–2016	Baotou Nanjiao	21	(1)
2017–	Meizhou Hakka	104	(0)
- * Club domestic league appearances and goals as of 14:01, 31 December 2022 (UTC)

Huo Liang (Chinese: 霍亮; born 15 October 1989) is a Chinese footballer currently playing as a full-back for Meizhou Hakka.

== Club career ==
Huo Liang would play for third tier club Qinghai Senke until their disbandment at the end of the 2013 China League Two season. He would join another third tier club in Baotou Nanjiao before joining second tier club Meizhou Hakka where he made his debut in a league game on 11 March 2017 against Dalian Yifang that ended in a 2-0 defeat. He would gain a reputation as a tough tackling, highly confrontational, versatile full-back, which resulted in him receiving a six games suspension and being fined 60,000 yuan for insulting the referee during the 15 June 2019 league game against Heilongjiang Lava Spring that ended in a 2-1 defeat. He would be a squad player as the club gained promotion to the top tier after coming second within the division at the end of the 2021 China League One campaign.

== Career statistics ==
As of 31 December 2022.

Club	Season	League			Cup		Continental		Other		Total	
Club	Season	Division	Apps	Goals	Apps	Goals	Apps	Goals	Apps	Goals	Apps	Goals
Qinghai Senke	2012	China League Two		0	–		–		–			0
Qinghai Senke	2013	China League Two		0	0	0	–		–			0
Qinghai Senke	Total			0	0	0	0	0	0	0		0
Baotou Nanjiao	2015	China League Two	7	1	1	0	–		–		8	1
Baotou Nanjiao	2016	China League Two	14	0	1	0	–		–		15	0
Baotou Nanjiao	Total		21	1	2	0	0	0	0	0	23	1
Meizhou Hakka	2017	China League One	26	0	0	0	–		–		26	0
Meizhou Hakka	2018	China League One	27	0	0	0	–		–		27	0
Meizhou Hakka	2019	China League One	18	0	0	0	–		–		18	0
Meizhou Hakka	2020	China League One	13	0	1	0	–		–		14	0
Meizhou Hakka	2021	China League One	15	0	0	0	–		–		15	0
Meizhou Hakka	2022	Chinese Super League	5	0	1	0	–		–		6	0
Meizhou Hakka	Total		104	0	2	0	0	0	0	0	106	0
Career total			125	1	4	0	0	0	0	0	129	1
