= Zou Peng =

Chinese footballer

Zou Peng 邹鹏
Personal information
- Date of birth: September 30, 1982 (age 44)
- Place of birth: Dalian, China
- Height: 1.79 m (5 ft 10 in)
- Position: Midfielder

Youth career
- 1992–1999: Dalian

Senior career*
Years	Team	Apps	(Gls)
1999–2007	Dalian Shide	39	(0)
2005	→ Sichuan First City (Loan)	15	(1)
2007	→ Jiangsu Sainty (Loan)	17	(2)
2008–2011	Chengdu Blades	45	(1)
2012	Shenzhen Mingbo	18	(2)
2013	Qinghai Senke	11	(0)
2014	Dalian Transcendence	0	(0)

Managerial career
- 2015-2017: Dalian Transcendence Reserve
- 2018: Dalian Transcendence (Assistant Coach)
- 2019-2022: Dalian Professional Youth
- 2023-: Dalian Young Boy Youth
- * Club domestic league appearances and goals as of 9 February 2022

Zou Peng (simplified Chinese: 邹鹏; traditional Chinese: 鄒鵬; pinyin: Zōu Péng; born September 30, 1982, in Dalian) is a former Chinese football player.

== Club career ==
Zou Peng began his professional career at Dalian Shide in 2000. He scored his first professional goal in the 2002 season against Sichuan Dahe. He suffered tore ligament in 2003, and was excluded from main squad.

In 2005, he was loaned to Sichuan First City.

In 2006, he returned to Dalian Shide, but did not have much appearances. By the end of the season, he sought for transfer to Wuhan Optics Valley, but the trade was unsuccessful.

In 2007, he was loaned to Jiangsu Sainty.

In 2008, he left Dalian and transferred to Chengdu Blades.

In 2012, Zou joined Shenzhen Mingbo. The team was dissolved before the season was finished.

In 2013, he moved to Qinghai Senke.

In 2014, Zou returned to Dalian and joined Dalian Transcendence in the China League Two.

== Managerial career ==
Zou retired after the 2014 season, and started to work as assistant coach for the team until 2018, when the team got dissolved.

In 2020, Zou Peng joined Dalian Pro as youth training coach.

== Career statistics ==
As of 3 March 2015

Appearances and goals by club, season and competition
Club	Season	League			National Cup		League Cup		Continental		Total	
Club	Season	Division	Apps	Goals	Apps	Goals	Apps	Goals	Apps	Goals	Apps	Goals
Dalian Shide	1999	Jia A League	0	0	0	0	-		-		0	0
Dalian Shide	2000	Jia A League	0	0	0	0	-		-		0	0
Dalian Shide	2001	Jia A League	9	0	5	0	-		-		14	0
Dalian Shide	2002	Jia A League	20	1	1	0	-		-		21	1
Dalian Shide	2003	Jia A League	3	0	0	0	-		1	0	4	0
Dalian Shide	2004	Chinese Super League	6	0	4	0	2	0	5	0	17	0
Dalian Shide	Total		38	1	10	0	2	0	6	0	56	1
Sichuan First City	2005	Chinese Super League	15	1	0	0	2	0	-		17	1
Dalian Shide	2006	Chinese Super League	1	0	2	0	-		0	0	3	0
Jiangsu Sainty	2007	China League One	17	2	-		-		-		17	2
Chengdu Better City	2008	Chinese Super League	20	0	-		-		-		20	0
Chengdu Better City	2009	Chinese Super League	11	0	-		-		-		11	0
Chengdu Better City	2010	China League One	8	1	-		-		-		8	1
Chengdu Better City	2011	Chinese Super League	6	0	1	0	-		-		7	0
Chengdu Better City	Total		45	1	1	0	-		-		46	1
Shenzhen Mingbo	2012	China League Two	18	2	-		-		-		18	2
Qinghai Senke	2013	China League Two	11	0	1	0	-		-		12	0
Dalian Transcendence	2014	China League Two	0	0	0	0	-		-		0	0
Career Total			145	7	14	0	4	0	6	0	169	7

== Honours ==
=== Club ===
Dalian Shide

- Chinese Jia-A League/Chinese Super League: 2000, 2001, 2002
- Chinese FA Cup: 2001
