= Jiao Fengbo =

Chinese footballer

Jiao Fengbo 焦凤波
Personal information
- Date of birth: July 23, 1983 (age 43)
- Place of birth: Tianjin, China
- Height: 1.85 m (6 ft 1 in)
- Position: Defender

Senior career*
Years	Team	Apps	(Gls)
2002	Beijing Longli		
2003–2004	Wuhan Yaqi		
2005–2009	Zhejiang Greentown	78	(1)
2010	Nanchang Bayi	14	(0)

Managerial career
- 2017–2026: Zhejiang FC (general manager)
- * Club domestic league appearances and goals as of 1 Jan 2012

Jiao Fengbo (Chinese: 焦凤波) (born July 23, 1983, in Tianjin) is a Chinese former football player who played as a defender.

== Club career ==
Jiao Fengbo started his football career with Beijing Longli's youth team and would move up to the senior team in 2002. By 2003 he would join fellow third-tier side Wuhan Yaqi where he stayed for two seasons before second-tier side Zhejiang Greentown became interested in his services with teammate Cai Chuchuan in 2005. The move would turn out to be a successful one and after 2006 Chinese league season the club would go on to win promotion after coming runners up in the division. After several seasons Jiao had established himself as a vital member within the team until the club had a disappointing 2009 league season, which saw them flirt with relegation. During the off season the club brought in several established defenders and Jiao was allowed to leave, this saw the transfer of him joining recently promoted side Nanchang Bayi F.C. who needed top tier experienced players. Jiao announced his retirement from professional football in 2011 and joined club chairman Song Weiping's real estate company Greentown China. He returned to Hangzhou Greentown FC (currently Zhejiang Greentown) on July 20, 2017, and was appointed as general manager of the club.

== Management career ==
On 20 July 2017, Jiao was appointed as the general manager of Hangzhou Greentown.

On 21 May 2026, Jiao was given a 5-year ban for match-fixing by the Chinese Football Association.
