= Mario Viera =

Uruguayan footballer and manager (born 1959)

Personal information
- Full name: Mario Roberto Viera Gil
- Date of birth: 19 October 1959 (age 67)
- Place of birth: Florida, Uruguay
- Position: Goalkeeper

Team information
- Current team: Atlético Junior (assistant)

Senior career*
Years	Team	Apps	(Gls)
1979–1982	Bella Vista		
1983	Racing Club Montevideo		
1985	Quilmes de Florida		
1986–1987	Miramar Misiones		
1989	Ituzaingó de Maldonado		
1990–1992	Central Palestino		
1993	Atlética Río Negro		

International career
1979	Uruguay U20		

Managerial career
- 1998: Everton Viña del Mar (assistant)
- 1999: Independiente Petrolero (assistant)
- 2000: Tianjin Lifei
- 2001: Atlético Florida
- 2002: Tianjin Mingte
- 2003: Cerro (assistant)
- 2004–2005: Danubio (assistant)
- 2006–2007: Alianza Lima (assistant)
- 2008–2010: Universidad César Vallejo
- 2012: Unión Comercio
- 2013–2014: Cienciano
- 2016: Comerciantes Unidos
- 2017–2018: Sport Boys
- 2018–2019: Ayacucho
- 2021: UTC
- 2022: Alianza Atlético
- 2023: Carlos A. Mannucci
- 2024–2025: Real Cartagena (assistant)
- 2026: Carlos A. Mannucci
- 2026–: Atlético Junior (assistant)
- * Club domestic league appearances and goals

Mario Roberto Viera Gil (born 19 October 1959) is a Uruguayan football manager and former player who played as a goalkeeper. He is the current assistant manager of Colombian club Atlético Junior.

== Career ==
Born in Florida, Viera only represented clubs in his home nation as a player, notably being a part of the Bella Vista squad who featured in the 1981 Copa Libertadores. After retiring, he was named Gerardo Pelusso's assistant at Everton de Viña del Mar.

In 2000, after a year as an assistant at Independiente Petrolero, Viera made his managerial debut while in charge of Chinese club Tianjin Lifei in the China League Two. He returned to his hometown in 2001 to manage Atlético Florida, but was later in charge of another Chinese club, Tianjin Mingte, in 2002.

Viera returned to work as an assistant to Pelusso at Cerro, Danubio and Alianza Lima before being appointed manager of Universidad César Vallejo in 2008. He left the club in 2010 and was named at the helm of Unión Comercio in 2012.

On 14 December 2012, Viera was appointed manager of Cienciano. He left the club on 13 May 2014, and spent more than a year without a club before taking over Comerciantes Unidos.

Viera opted to leave Comerciantes on 27 December 2016, and took over Sport Boys four days later. He was sacked on 1 March 2018, he was named at the helm of Ayacucho on 6 June.

On 28 November 2019, Viera left Ayacucho to join Carlos A. Mannucci as a sporting director. On 26 May 2021, he returned to the manager duties after being appointed at Universidad Técnica de Cajamarca.

On 13 November 2021, Viera was appointed manager of Alianza Atlético for the 2022 season. He left on 4 November 2022, and returned to Mannucci the following day.

== Honours ==
Sport Boys

- Peruvian Segunda División: 2017
