= Song Chen =

Chinese footballer

Song Chen 宋琛
Personal information
- Date of birth: 3 January 1990 (age 36)
- Place of birth: Dalian, Liaoning, China
- Height: 1.79 m (5 ft 10 1/2 in)
- Position: Defender

Youth career
- Dalian Shide

Senior career*
Years	Team	Apps	(Gls)
2008	Dalian Shide Siwu FC	5	(0)
2010–2011	Shenzhen Ruby	19	(0)
2012–2019	Liaoning Whowin	73	(2)
2013	→ Qinghai Senke (loan)	?	(2)
2020–2023	Sichuan Jiuniu	70	(2)
2024	Liaoning Tieren	13	(1)
2024–2025	Dalian K'un City	38	(1)
- * Club domestic league appearances and goals as of 31 December 2020

Song Chen (Chinese: 宋琛; born 3 January 1990 in Dalian) is a Chinese former football player.

== Club career ==
Song Chen would start his football career playing for the various Dalian Shide F.C. youth teams before he was sent out to the team's reserve team called Dalian Shide Siwu FC that was allowed to take part in Singapore's 2008 S.League. He would make his debut on 21 February 2008 in a league game against Home United that ended in a 2–1 defeat. He would return to the Dalian Shide's youth team as they participated in the 2009 National Games of China. He would go on to transfer to Chinese Super League team Shenzhen Ruby in 2010 along with teammate Quan Heng. He would eventually make his league debut for Shenzhen on 2 May 2010 in a game against Henan Jianye, coming on as a substitute for Yuan Lin in the 43rd minute. Song would gradually start to establish himself within the team until the introduction of new Head coach Philippe Troussier, who did not integrate Song into his tactical system.

In February 2012, he transferred to Chinese Super League side Liaoning Whowin. In February 2013, Song moved to China League Two side Qinghai Senke on a one-year loan deal. On his return he gradually started to become a regular within the team, but was also part of the squad that saw the club relegated at the end of the 2017 Chinese Super League campaign. He left the club after they were dissolved on 23 May 2020 due to wage arrears. He would join another second-tier club in Sichuan Jiuniu, on a free transfer and would make his debut in a league game against Kunshan FC on 13 September 2020 in a 2–0 defeat.

On 21 May 2026, Song was given a 5-year ban for match-fixing by the Chinese Football Association.

== Career statistics ==
Statistics accurate as of match played 5 November 2023.

Appearances and goals by club, season and competition
Club	Season	League			National Cup		Continental		Other		Total	
Club	Season	Division	Apps	Goals	Apps	Goals	Apps	Goals	Apps	Goals	Apps	Goals
Dalian Shide Siwu FC	2008	S. League	5	0	0	0	-		-		5	0
Shenzhen Ruby	2010	Chinese Super League	17	0	-		-		-		17	0
Shenzhen Ruby	2011	Chinese Super League	2	0	0	0	-		-		2	0
Shenzhen Ruby	Total		19	0	0	0	0	0	0	0	19	0
Liaoning Whowin	2012	Chinese Super League	1	0	0	0	-		-		1	0
Liaoning Whowin	2014	Chinese Super League	1	0	0	0	-		-		1	0
Liaoning Whowin	2015	Chinese Super League	5	0	1	0	-		-		6	0
Liaoning Whowin	2016	Chinese Super League	9	0	2	0	-		-		11	0
Liaoning Whowin	2017	Chinese Super League	5	0	1	0	-		-		6	0
Liaoning Whowin	2018	China League One	25	0	0	0	-		-		25	0
Liaoning Whowin	2019	China League One	27	1	0	0	-		2 (Note: Appearances in 2019 China League One relegation play-off games)	1	29	2
Liaoning Whowin	Total		73	1	4	0	0	0	2	1	79	2
Qinghai Senke (loan)	2013	China League Two		2	2	0	-		-		2	2
Sichuan Jiuniu	2020	China League One	13	1	-		-		-		13	1
Sichuan Jiuniu	2021	China League One	28	0	2	0	-		-		30	0
Sichuan Jiuniu	2022	China League One	17	1	0	0	-		-		17	1
Sichuan Jiuniu	2023	China League One	15	0	2	0	-		-		17	0
Sichuan Jiuniu	Total		73	2	4	0	0	0	0	0	77	2
Career total			170	5	10	0	0	0	2	1	182	6
