= Cui Yu =

Chinese association football player

Personal information
- Date of birth: 27 June 1989 (age 37)
- Height: 1.78 m (5 ft 10 in)
- Position: Defender

Youth career
- 2001–2002: Beijing Sangao
- 2003–2009: Beijing Guoan

Senior career*
Years	Team	Apps	(Gls)
2010–2011	Beijing Guoan	0	(0)
2010	→ Beijing Guoan Talent (Singapore) (loan)	25	(0)
2010	→ Qingdao QUST (loan)	6	(0)
2012	Beijing Baxy	0	(0)
2012	→ Beijing Yitong Kuche (loan)	20	(2)
2013	Qinghai Senke		
2014–2018	Dalian Transcendence	11	(0)
Total		62	(2)
- * Club domestic league appearances and goals

Cui Yu (Chinese: 崔宇; pinyin: Cuī Yǔ; born 27 June 1989) is a Chinese footballer.

== Early life ==
On June 28, 1989, Cui was born in China.

== Career statistics ==
=== Club ===
As of 6 June 2019.

Club	Season	League			National Cup		League Cup		Other		Total	
Club	Season	Division	Apps	Goals	Apps	Goals	Apps	Goals	Apps	Goals	Apps	Goals
Beijing Guoan	2010	Chinese Super League	0	0	0	0	–		0	0	0	0
Beijing Guoan	2011	Chinese Super League	0	0	0	0	–		0	0	0	0
Beijing Guoan	Total		0	0	0	0	0	0	0	0	0	0
Beijing Guoan Talent (Singapore) (loan)	2010	S. League	25	0	1 (Note: Appearances in the Singapore Cup)	0	1 (Note: Appearances in the Singapore League Cup)	0	0	0	27	0
Qingdao QUST (loan)	2010	China Amateur Football League	6	0	0	0	–		0	0	6	0
Beijing Baxy	2012	China League One	0	0	0	0	–		0	0	0	0
Beijing Yitong Kuche (loan)	2012	China League Two	20	2	0	0	–		0	0	20	2
Qinghai Senke	2013	China League Two	–		2 (Note: Appearances in the Chinese FA Cup)	0	–		0	0	2	0
Dalian Transcendence	2015	China League Two	6	0	1	0	–		4 (Note: Appearances in the China League Two playoffs)	0	11	0
Dalian Transcendence	2016	China League One	1	0	1	0	–		0	0	2	0
Dalian Transcendence	2017	China League One	3	0	1	0	–		0	0	4	0
Dalian Transcendence	2018	China League One	1	0	1	0	–		0	0	2	0
Dalian Transcendence	Total		11	0	4	0	0	0	4	0	19	0
Career total			62	2	7	0	1	0	4	0	74	2
