= Zhejiang Professional F.C. =

Association football club in China

Zhejiang
- Full name: Zhejiang Professional Football Club 浙江职业足球俱乐部
- Nickname: Green Giants (绿巨人)
- Founded: 14 January 1998; 28 years ago as Zhejiang Green Town
- Ground: Huanglong Sports Center, Hangzhou
- Capacity: 51,971
- Owner(s): Hangzhou Commerce and Tourism Group; Zhejiang Energy Group
- Chairman: Zhang Weidong
- Head coach: Vacant
- League: Chinese Super League
- 2026: Chinese Super League, 9th of 16
- Website: www.zhejiangfc1998.com
| Home colours | Away colours |

Zhejiang Professional Football Club (Chinese: 浙江职业足球俱乐部; pinyin: Zhèjiāng Zhíyè Zúqiú Jùlèbù), commonly referred to as Zhejiang, is a Chinese professional football club based in Hangzhou, Zhejiang, that competes in the Chinese Super League, the top tier of Chinese football. Zhejiang plays its home matches at the Huanglong Sports Center, located within Xihu District. The club's main investors are the Zhejiang-based Greentown China Holdings Limited company and the Zhejiang Energy Group.

The club was founded on 14 January 1998, as Zhejiang Green Town, making their debut in the third tier of China's football league pyramid in the 1999 league season. On 23 November 2000, the club bought the playing right for the Chinese Football Association Jia League as well as 32 players from the first team of Jilin Aodong for 25 million Yuan. They have subsequently won promotion to the top tier after finishing runners-up in the 2006 league season. The highest position they have ever finished is third, achieved in the 2022 and 2023 Chinese Super League seasons.

== History ==
Zhejiang Green Town Football Club Co., Ltd. was officially established on January 14, 1998, with a capital base of 16 million yuan. Zeng Leming was appointed as general manager. Greentown Real Estate Company, Hangzhou Qiantang Real Estate Company, Zhejiang University and Zhejiang Provincial Football Association all participated in the creation and registration of the club. The team participated in the third tier with Bao Yingfu as their first head coach. They made the play-offs in 2000 before losing to Tianjin Lifei.

In November 2000, the club bought the playing rights to participate in the Chinese Football Association Jia League as well as 32 players from Yanbian F.C. for 25 million Yuan. Under the new general manager Shen Qiang, the club failed to win promotion to the top tier league, as several players and coaches were discovered to be taking bribes to throw games. Offending participants were banned for a year and the club had to reform and re-apply for a CFA playing license. The club then went through several management changes as well as a significant ownership shift, which saw Song Weiping's company Greentown China Holdings Limited take a 96% share of the team for 20 million yuan in 2005 while Zhejiang University held on to 4%.

The team achieved promotion at the end of the 2006 league season when they came second in the division.

=== Hangzhou Greentown ===
In 2009, the club renamed itself to Hangzhou Greentown Football Club.

Zhejiang Green Town Football Club logo used in 1998

The club was set to be relegated at the end of the 2009 season, but were allowed to stay remain in the 2010 CFA Super League after it was discovered that Chengdu Blades and Guangzhou GPC were guilty of match-fixing.

==== AFC Champions League debut ====
After the 2009 season, the club signed several established Chinese internationals such as Du Wei, Li Yan and Wang Song. The club's results significantly improved throughout the 2010 league campaign, which saw them achieve their highest ever finish of fourth and a chance to play in the 2011 AFC Champions League for the first time.

They were relegated to the 2017 China League One after finishing in second-to-last place in the 2016 Chinese Super League.

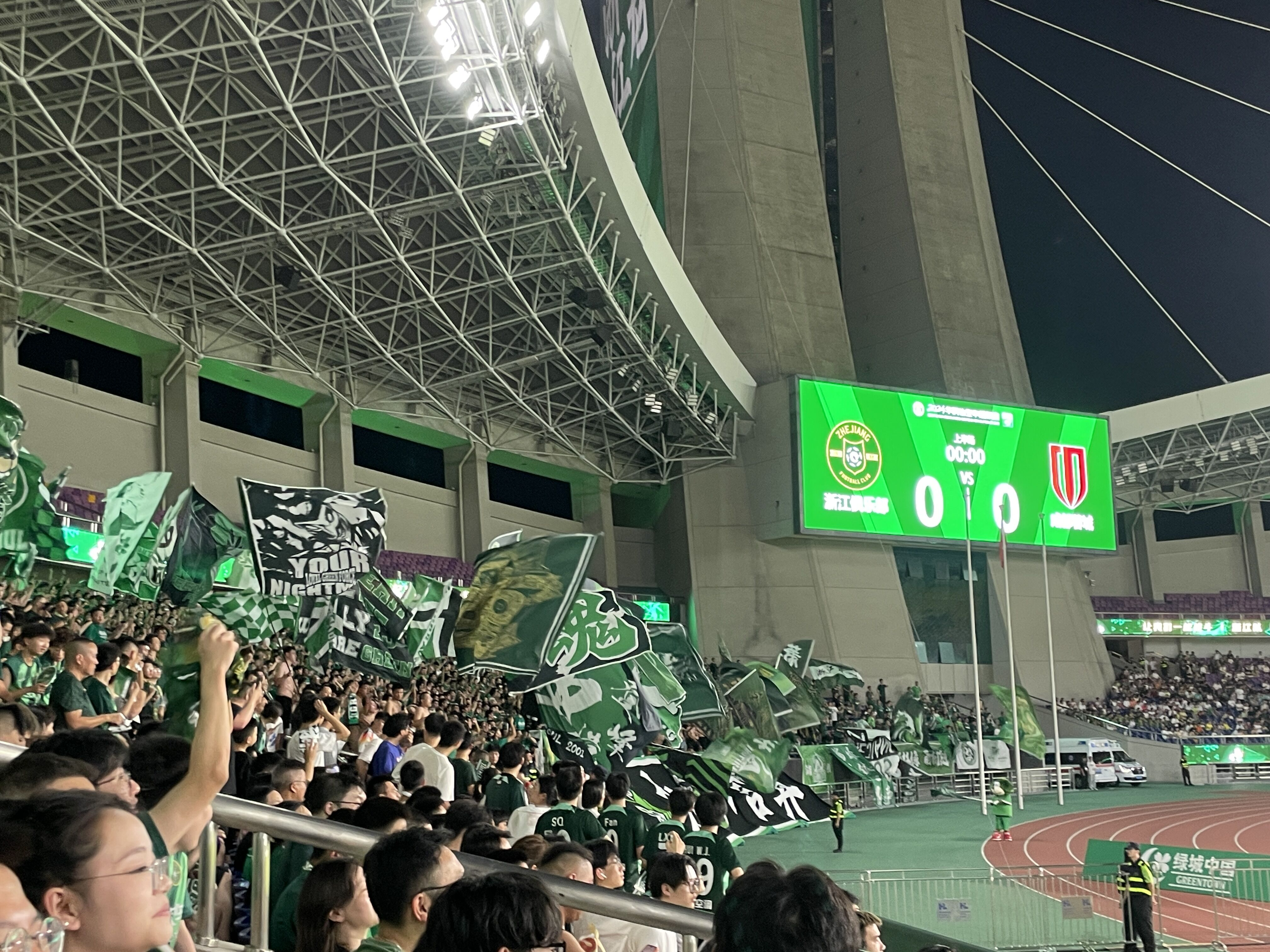
Huanglong Sports Center On July 28, 2024, Zhejiang team hosted Chengdu Rongcheng in the Chinese Super League match

Aiming to win the 2017 National Games of China, Hangzhou Greentown prioritized the club's youth. However, the team struggled near the relegation zone in their first season of China League. Young trainer Xu Lei filled for manager Hong Myung-bo and the team returned to 9th place in the league. Former player and veteran Jiao Fengbo returned as the new general manager.

=== Zhejiang Greentown ===
On 14 January 2018, the club changed their name to Zhejiang Greentown Football Club for the 20th anniversary of the club. They reached third place in the China League.

=== Zhejiang Energy Greentown ===
In September 2020, the team changed their name to Zhejiang Energy Greentown Football Club, as Zhejiang Energy Group stepped in as one of the major shareholders and Song Weiping officially quit the club.

=== Rebrand to Zhejiang ===
On 26 February 2021, according to the requirements of non-corporate change of club name by the Chinese Football Association, the club's name changed to Zhejiang Professional Football Club.

=== Return to the AFC Champions League ===
Zhejiang finished third in the 2022 Chinese Super League season, qualifying for the 2023–24 AFC Champions League group stage.

On 20 June 2024, AFC confirmed Zhejiang would participate in the inaugural 2024–25 AFC Champions League Two group stage. Zhejiang was placed in Group F alongside Thai club Port FC, Singaporean club Lion City Sailors and Indonesian club Persib Bandung.

=== 2026 Chinese Super League season ===
In 2026, Zhejiang started the 2026 Chinese Super League season with five points deducted for violation of sports ethics and loss of sportsmanship as they engaged in improper transactions to seek illegitimate benefits.

== Name history ==
| Period | Club Name | | First Team Name | |
|---|---|---|---|---|
| 1998–2001 | Zhejiang Green Town | 浙江绿城 | Zhejiang Green Town | 浙江绿城 |
| 2001–04 | Zhejiang Green Town | 浙江绿城 | Zhejiang Sanhua Green Town (Sponsor Name) | 浙江三花绿城 |
| 2004–09 | Zhejiang Green Town | 浙江绿城 | Zhejiang Babei Green Town (Sponsor Name) | 浙江巴贝绿城 |
| 2009–10 | Hangzhou Greentown | 杭州绿城 | Hangzhou Greentown | 杭州绿城 |
| 2010–12 | Hangzhou Greentown | 杭州绿城 | Hangzhou Nabel Greentown (Sponsor Name) | 杭州诺贝尔绿城 |
| 2012–13 | Hangzhou Greentown | 杭州绿城 | Hangzhou 9Top Greentown (Sponsor Name) | 杭州九好绿城 |
| 2013–14 | Hangzhou Greentown | 杭州绿城 | Hangzhou Daikin Greentown (Sponsor Name) | 杭州大金绿城 |
| 2014–18 | Hangzhou Greentown | 杭州绿城 | Hangzhou Greentown | 杭州绿城 |
| 2018–20 | Zhejiang Greentown | 浙江绿城 | Zhejiang Greentown | 浙江绿城 |
| 2020–21 | Zhejiang Energy Greentown | 浙江能源绿城 | Zhejiang Energy Greentown | 浙江能源绿城 |
| 2021–present | Zhejiang Professional | 浙江职业 | Zhejiang | 浙江 |

== Current squad ==
=== First team ===
As of July 2026

Note: Flags indicate national team as defined under FIFA eligibility rules; some limited exceptions apply. Players may hold more than one non-FIFA nationality.

| No. | Pos. | Nation | Player |
|---|---|---|---|
| 1 | GK | CHN | Dong Chunyu |
| 3 | DF | CHN | Wang Yang |
| 4 | DF | KOR | Park Jin-seob |
| 5 | DF | CHN | Liu Haofan |
| 6 | MF | CHN | Bao Shengxin |
| 7 | FW | CHN | Tao Qianglong |
| 8 | MF | GAB | Alexander N'Doumbou |
| 9 | FW | CHN | Gao Di |
| 10 | MF | CRO | Marko Tolić |
| 11 | FW | CHN | Wang Yudong |
| 13 | FW | CHN | Ma Haoqi |
| 14 | MF | CHN | Wu Wei |
| 16 | DF | CHN | Tong Lei |
| 17 | DF | CHN | Wang Shiqin |
| 18 | FW | CHN | Fang Hao |

| No. | Pos. | Nation | Player |
|---|---|---|---|
| 20 | FW | CHN | Ning Fangze |
| 21 | MF | CHN | Qian Yuanfan |
| 22 | MF | CHN | Cheng Jin (captain) |
| 24 | GK | CHN | Zhao Peicheng |
| 25 | DF | CHN | Xu Junchi |
| 26 | DF | CHN | Sun Guowen |
| 27 | FW | BRA | Felippe Cardoso |
| 28 | FW | ROU | Alexandru Mitriță |
| 29 | MF | CHN | Zhang Jiaqi |
| 32 | GK | CHN | Huo Shenping |
| 33 | GK | CHN | Zhao Bo |
| 34 | DF | CHN | Wang Pengbo |
| 36 | DF | BRA | Lucas Possignolo |
| 38 | DF | CHN | Zhang Aihui |
| 40 | FW | CHN | Zhou Wentao |
| 41 | MF | CHN | Jiang Yuxuan |

=== Reserve team ===
Note: Flags indicate national team as defined under FIFA eligibility rules; some limited exceptions apply. Players may hold more than one non-FIFA nationality.

| No. / Pos. / Nation / Player | No. / Pos. / Nation / Player |

=== Out on loan ===
Note: Flags indicate national team as defined under FIFA eligibility rules; some limited exceptions apply. Players may hold more than one non-FIFA nationality.

| No. | Pos. | Nation | Player |
|---|---|---|---|
| — | MF | CHN | Wang Junjie (at Guangdong GZ-Power until 31 December 2026) |
| — | MF | CHN | Ablikim Abdusalam (at Hangzhou Linping Wuyue until 31 December 2026) |

== Notable players ==
Players who have played for Zhejiang and represented their nations at senior level.

- (Colombia) John Jairo Trellez (2001–04)
- (Cameroon) Bertin Tomou (2002–03, 2005)
- (Brazil) Argel Fuchs (2007)
- (Hong Kong) Ng Wai Chiu (2009–10)
- (Honduras) Luis Ramírez (2010–11)
- (South Korea) Kim Dong-jin (2012–13)
- (Japan) Masashi Oguro (2013)
- (Chinese Taipei) Chen Po-liang (2015–19)
- (Australia) Matthew Spiranovic (2015–17)
- (Australia) Tim Cahill (2016)
- (Lebanon) Roda Antar (2016)
- (Croatia) Sammir (2016)
- (South Africa) Dino Ndlovu (2018–20)
- (Zimbabwe) Nyasha Mushekwi (2019–23)
- (Hong Kong) Leung Nok Hang (2021–25)
- (Croatia) Franko Andrijašević (2021–25)
- (Ivory Coast) Jean Evrard Kouassi (2023–25)
- (Gabon) Aaron Boupendza (2025)

== Coaching staff ==
As of 21 February 2025

| Position | Staff {{Fb cs staff |bg= |p=Head coach |s= vacant |
|---|---|
| Assistant coach | (China) Cai Chuchuan (Australia) David Zdrillic (Australia) Luciano Trani (China) Fu Bo |
| Goalkeeping coach | (Portugal) Ricardo Cruz |
| Fitness coach | (Germany) Bjorn Rosemeier |

=== Managerial history ===
As of Beginning of 2025 Chinese league season

- (China) Bao Yingfu (22 Jan 1999 – Dec 1999) (general coach)
- (China) Zhu Haibo (May 1999 – Dec 1999)
- (China) Wu Tingrui (Dec 1999 – Jul 2000)
- (China) Zhang Jingtian (18 Jan 2000 – 2000) (general coach)
- (China) Zhou Chenggui (Jul 2000 – Oct 2000)
- (China) Gu Mingchang (23 Dec 2001 – 7 Jul 2001)
- (China) Wang Changtai (8 Jul 2001 – 21 Jul 2001) (caretaker)
- (Federal Republic of Yugoslavia) Goran Kalušević (24 Jul 2001 – 28 Aug 2001)
- (China) Wang Changtai (28 Aug 2001 – 6 Oct 2001) (caretaker)
- (England) Bobby Houghton (Jan 2002 – 21 Jul 2003)
- (China) Li Bing (21 Jul 2003 – Dec 2003)
- (China) Wang Zheng (Dec 2003 – 15 May 2007)
- (China) Zhou Suian (15 May 2007 – Dec 2007)
- (China) Sun Wei (Dec 2007 – 21 Apr 2008)
- (China) Zhou Suian (21 Apr 2008 – 21 Sept 2009)
- (China) Wu Jingui (21 Sept 2009 – Nov 2011)
- Team Committee (16 Oct 2011 – Nov 2011)
- (Japan) Takeshi Okada (15 Dec 2011 – 5 Nov 2013)
- (China) Yang Ji (6 Nov 2013 – 4 Nov 2014)
- (France) Philippe Troussier (2 Dec 2014 – 1 Jul 2015)
- (China) Yang Ji (1 Jul 2015 – Nov 2015)
- (South Korea) Hong Myung-bo (17 Dec 2015 – 25 May 2017)
- (Bulgaria) Zdravko Zdravkov (25 May 2017 – Nov 2017) (caretaker)
- (Spain) Sergi Barjuán (26 Nov 2017 – 3 July 2019)
- (China) Zheng Xiong (3 July 2019 – 31 Dec 2020)
- (Spain) Jordi Vinyals (1 Jan 2021 – 31 Dec 2024)
- (Spain) Raúl Caneda (29 Jan 2025 – 21 Dec 2025)
- (Australia) Ross Aloisi (22 Dec 2025 – 9 Nov 2026)

== Grounds ==
| Ground | Location | Total | CSL | Jia B / CL1 | Yi | Cup |
|---|---|---|---|---|---|---|
| Zhejiang Stadium | Hangzhou | 13 | 0 | 0 | 13 | 0 |
| Huanglong Sports Center | Hangzhou | 254 | 122 | 115 | 0 | 17 |
| Meihu Sports Centre | Jinhua | 17 | 16 | 0 | 0 | 1 |
| Jiaxing Stadium | Jiaxing | 9 | 7 | 0 | 0 | 2 |
| Jinhua Sports Center | Jinhua | 7 | 3 | 4 | 0 | 0 |
| Zhoushan Sports Center | Zhoushan | 2 | 0 | 1 | 0 | 1 |
| Huzhou Olympic Sports Center | Huzhou | 1 | 1 | 0 | 0 | 0 |

== Records ==
- Most league points in a season: 74 (China League, season 2021)
- Record victory: 6–0 v Tianjin Lifei (Jia B, 21 April 2001)
- Record defeat: 0–6 v Changchun Yatai (Jia B, 6 October 2001)
- Record attendance: 48,000 v Shanghai Zhongyuan (Jia B, 19 May 2001)
- Most league appearances: Cao Xuan (221)
- Top scorer: Nyasha Mushekwi (43 goals)
- Top league scorer: Nyasha Mushekwi (42 goals)
- Most league goals scored by a player in a season: Nyasha Mushekwi (23 goals, China League, season 2021)

== Honours ==
=== Major ===
==== League ====
- Chinese Super League
  - Third: 2022, 2023
- China League One
  - Runners-up: 2006, 2020
  - Third: 2005, 2018, 2021

==== Cup ====
- CFA Cup
  - Runners-up: 2022
  - Third: 2002 (shared), 2006 (shared)

=== Minor / Reserve / Youth ===
- CSL Reserve League
  - Third: 2014
- CSL Elite League (U19)
  - Champion: 2015
- China League Reserve League
  - Runners-up: 2017
- National Games of China
  - Champions: 2021 (U20)
  - Runners-up: 2017 (U20), 2013 (U18)
  - Third: 2013 (U20)

== Results ==
All-time League rankings

As of the end of 2025 season.

| Season | Division | | Pld | W | D | L | GF | GA | GD | Pts | Pos. | | FA Cup | Other | Att./G | Stadium | Top league scorer(s) | Scores |
|---|---|---|---|---|---|---|---|---|---|---|---|---|---|---|---|---|---|---|
| 1998 | did not enter league system | | | | | | | | | | | | DNQ | - | - | - | - | - |
| 1999 | Yi | 1st Stage Group B | 10 | 3 | 2 | 5 | 12 | 15 | −3 | 11 | 5 | Final 17 | DNQ | - | Unknown | Zhejiang Stadium | Yao Changming Qin Peng | 3 |
| 2000 | Yi | 1st Stage Group C | 10 | 7 | 2 | 1 | 20 | 4 | 16 | 23 | 1 | Final 8 | DNQ | - | Unknown | Zhejiang Stadium | Yao Changming | 12 |
| 2000 | Yi | 2nd Stage South Region | 6 | 2 | 1 | 3 | 11 | 13 | −2 | 7 | 4 | Final 8 | DNQ | - | Unknown | Zhejiang Stadium | Yao Changming | 12 |
| 2000 | Yi | 3nd Stage 1st Round | 2 | 0 | 0 | 2 | 0 | 5 | −5 | lost | - | Final 8 | DNQ | - | - | tournament (Wuhan) | Yao Changming | 12 |
| 2001 | Jia B^{1} | | 22 | 6 | 10 | 6 | 33 | 26 | 7 | 28 | 8 | | R1 | - | 24,182 | Huanglong Sports Center | Adolfo Valencia | 12 |
| 2002 | Jia B | | 22 | 8 | 5 | 9 | 29 | 33 | −4 | 29 | 7 | | SF | - | 16,364 | Huanglong Sports Center Meihu Sports Centre | Bertin Tomou | 7 |
| 2003 | Jia B | | 26 | 6 | 9 | 11 | 39 | 39 | 0 | 27 | 10 | | R1 | - | 11,615 | Huanglong Sports Center | Adolfo Valencia | 14 |
| 2004 | CL | | 32 | 12 | 9 | 11 | 38 | 39 | −1 | 45 | 8 | | R1 | - | 3,625 | Huanglong Sports Center | Shen Liuxi | 10 |
| 2005 | CL | | 26 | 17 | 4 | 5 | 50 | 23 | 27 | 55 | 3 | | R2 | - | 14,917 | Huanglong Sports Center | Bertin Tomou | 11 |
| 2006 | CL | | 24 | 17 | 4 | 3 | 41 | 18 | 23 | 55 | RU | | SF | - | 25,500 | Huanglong Sports Center | Alex Chandre de Oliveira | 15 |
| 2007 | CSL | | 28 | 6 | 10 | 12 | 25 | 35 | −10 | 28 | 11 | | NH | - | 19,571 | Huanglong Sports Center Meihu Sports Centre | Alex Chandre de Oliveira | 5 |
| 2008 | CSL | | 30 | 9 | 12 | 9 | 38 | 32 | 6 | 39 | 9 | | NH | - | 12,188 | Huanglong Sports Center | Erivaldo Antonio Saraiva | 10 |
| 2009 | CSL | | 30 | 8 | 8 | 14 | 30 | 43 | −13 | 32 | 15^{2} | | NH | - | 14,790 | Huanglong Sports Center | Erivaldo Antonio Saraiva | 13 |
| 2010 | CSL | | 30 | 13 | 9 | 8 | 38 | 30 | 8 | 48 | 4 | | NH | - | 14,550 | Huanglong Sports Center Meihu Sports Centre | Luis Alfredo Ramírez | 14 |
| 2011 | CSL | | 30 | 10 | 9 | 11 | 28 | 32 | −4 | 39 | 8 | | QF | ACL Group | 8,586 | Meihu Sports Centre Jiaxing Stadium | Luis Alfredo Ramírez | 7 |
| 2012 | CSL | | 30 | 9 | 9 | 12 | 34 | 46 | −12 | 36 | 11 | | QF | - | 10,563 | Huanglong Sports Center | Wang Song Renatinho | 8 |
| 2013 | CSL | | 30 | 8 | 10 | 12 | 34 | 42 | −8 | 34 | 12 | | QF | - | 14,164 | Huanglong Sports Center | Davy Claude Angan | 9 |
| 2014 | CSL | | 30 | 8 | 8 | 14 | 43 | 60 | −17 | 32 | 12 | | R4 | - | 13,766 | Huanglong Sports Center | Anselmo Ramon | 16 |
| 2015 | CSL | | 30 | 8 | 9 | 13 | 27 | 35 | −8 | 33 | 11 | | R4 | - | 12,566 | Huanglong Sports Center | Anselmo Ramon | 12 |
| 2016 | CSL | | 30 | 8 | 8 | 14 | 28 | 37 | −9 | 32 | 15 | | R4 | - | 11,723 | Huanglong Sports Center Jinhua Sports Center | Anselmo Ramon | 7 |
| 2017 | CL | | 30 | 8 | 12 | 10 | 31 | 39 | −8 | 36 | 9 | | R4 | - | 4,881 | Huanglong Sports Center Jinhua Sports Center Zhoushan Sports Center | Anselmo Ramon | 6 |
| 2018 | CL | | 30 | 14 | 9 | 7 | 53 | 38 | 15 | 51 | 3 | | R3 | - | 8,717 | Huanglong Sports Center Zhoushan Sports Center | Dino Ndlovu | 19 |
| 2019 | CL | | 30 | 14 | 9 | 7 | 49 | 40 | 9 | 51 | 6 | | R4 | - | 8,678 | Huanglong Sports Center | Dino Ndlovu | 17 |
| 2020 | CL | 1st Stage Group B | 10 | 5 | 4 | 1 | 19 | 8 | 11 | 19 | 2 | RU^{3} | R2 | - | - | tournament (Meizhou) | Nyasha Mushekwi | 7 |
| 2020 | CL | 2nd Stage Group D | 5 | 3 | 1 | 1 | 8 | 5 | 3 | 10 | 2 | RU^{3} | R2 | - | - | tournament (Chengdu) | Nyasha Mushekwi | 7 |
| 2021 | CL | | 34 | 22 | 8 | 4 | 69 | 28 | 41 | 74 | 3^{4} | | R4 | - | - | tournament (Meizhou) | Nyasha Mushekwi | 23 |
| 2022 | CSL | | 34 | 18 | 11 | 5 | 64 | 28 | 36 | 65 | 3 | | F | - | 3,500 | Huzhou Olympic Sports Center tournament (Haikou, Round 1-10) | Nyasha Mushekwi | 18 |
| 2023 | CSL | | 30 | 16 | 7 | 7 | 57 | 34 | 23 | 55 | 3 | | R4 | ACL Group | 8,053 | Huzhou Olympic Sports Center | Léo Souza | 19 |
| 2024 | CSL | | 30 | 11 | 5 | 14 | 55 | 60 | −5 | 38 | 7 | | R5 | ACL Two Group | 19,805 | Huanglong Sports Center | Léo Souza | 9 |
| 2025 | CSL | | 30 | 10 | 12 | 8 | 60 | 51 | 9 | 42 | 7 | | R4 | - | 25,024 | Huanglong Sports Center | Wang Yudong | 11 |

^1Bought the first team of Jilin Aodong as well as their position in second tier.

^2Two CSL clubs were involved in match-fixing scandal and relegated to China League, so Hangzhou Greentown could stay at top level.

^3Failed to achieve promotion in the play-off.

^4Promotion was achieved via the play-off.

Key

| | China top division |
| | China second division |
| | China third division |
| W | Winners |
| RU | Runners-up |
| 3 | Third place |
| | Relegated |

- Pld = Played
- W = Games won
- D = Games drawn
- L = Games lost
- F = Goals for
- A = Goals against
- Pts = Points
- Pos = Final position
- DNQ = Did not qualify
- DNE = Did not enter
- NH = Not Held
- – = Does Not Exist
- R1 = Round 1
- R2 = Round 2
- R3 = Round 3
- R4 = Round 4
- F = Final
- SF = Semi-finals
- QF = Quarter-finals
- R16 = Round of 16
- Group = Group stage
- GS2 = Second Group stage
- QR1 = First Qualifying Round
- QR2 = Second Qualifying Round
- QR3 = Third Qualifying Round

== Feeder teams ==
- Hangzhou Luyuan (1999–2003) [Youth team of Zhejiang Green Town FC]
  - 2000, 2001 Chinese Yi League
- Ningbo Huaao (2006) [Youth team of Zhejiang Green Town FC]
  - 2006 China D2 League
- Wenzhou Provenza (2011) [U19 team of Hangzhou Greentown FC]
  - 2011 China D2 League

== International friendlies ==
- On 26 July 2009, Manchester United visited the Huanglong Stadium and played a friendly against Hangzhou Greentown as part of their pre-season Asian tour. Manchester United won by 8 goals to 2.
- On 16 July 2011, Arsenal visited the Meihu Stadium and played a friendly against Hangzhou Greentown as part of their pre-season Asian tour. The game was drawn 1–1.
- Zhejiang Greentown also played two friendly games at the Mini Estadi in 2017 and 2019, against FC Barcelona B with the Spanish side won 1-0 and 3-1 respectively.

== Continental results ==
| Season | Competition | Round | Opposition | Home | Away | Rank /Agg. |
|---|---|---|---|---|---|---|
| 2011 | AFC Champions League | Group stage | (Japan) Nagoya Grampus | 2–0 | 0–1 | 4th |
| 2011 | AFC Champions League | Group stage | (South Korea) FC Seoul | 1–1 | 0–3 | 4th |
| 2011 | AFC Champions League | Group stage | (United Arab Emirates) Al-Ain | 0–0 | 0–1 | 4th |
| 2023–24 | AFC Champions League | Play-off round | (Thailand) Port | 1–0 | —N/a | —N/a |
| 2023–24 | AFC Champions League | Group stage | (Thailand) Buriram United | 3–2 | 1–4 | 3rd |
| 2023–24 | AFC Champions League | Group stage | (Australia) Melbourne City | 1–2 | 1–1 | 3rd |
| 2023–24 | AFC Champions League | Group stage | (Japan) Ventforet Kofu | 2–0 | 1–4 | 3rd |
| 2024–25 | AFC Champions League Two | Group stage | (Thailand) Port | 1-2 | 0-1 | 3rd |
| 2024–25 | AFC Champions League Two | Group stage | (Singapore) Lion City Sailors | 4-2 | 0-2 | 3rd |
| 2024–25 | AFC Champions League Two | Group stage | (Indonesia) Persib | 1-0 | 4-3 | 3rd |

== Kit history ==
| Season | Kit manufacturer | Colour (H) | Sponsor (H) | | Colour (A) | Sponsor (A) | |
|---|---|---|---|---|---|---|---|
| 1998 | - | - | - | - | - | - | - |
| 1999 | Adidas | Blue | Green Town | 绿城 | Red | Green Town | 绿城 |
| 2000 | Adidas | Blue | Green Town | 绿城 | Red | Green Town | 绿城 |
| 2001 | Ucan | White | Green Town (Round 1) | 绿城（第1轮） | Blue / Red | Green Town (Round 1) | 绿城（第1轮） |
| 2001 | Ucan | White | Sanhua (from Round 2) | 浙江三花（第2-4轮） | Blue / Red | Sanhua (from Round 2) | 浙江三花（第2-4轮） |
| 2001 | Ucan | White | Sanhua (from Round 2) | 三花（第5-22轮） | Blue / Red | Sanhua (from Round 2) | 三花（第5-22轮） |
| 2002 | Ucan | Blue | Sanhua | 三花 | White / Green | Sanhua | 三花 |
| 2003 | Ucan | Green | Sanhua | 三花 | White | Sanhua | 三花 |
| 2004 | Ucan | White | Babei | 巴贝 | Green / Yellow / Red | Babei | 巴贝 |
| 2005 | Umbro | White | Babei | 巴贝 | Green / Yellow / Blue / Red | Babei | 巴贝 |
| 2006 | Kika | White | Babei | 巴贝 | Red | Babei | 巴贝 |
| 2007 | Asics | White | Babei | 巴贝 | Black | Babei | 巴贝 |
| 2008 | Kappa | White | Babei | 巴贝 | Green | Babei | 巴贝 |
| 2009 | Nike | Green | CIMIC (from Round 10) | 斯米克 | Black | CIMIC (from Round 10) | 斯米克 |
| 2010 | Nike | Green & White | Nabel | 诺贝尔瓷砖 | White | Nabel | 诺贝尔瓷砖 |
| 2011 | Nike | Green | Nabel | 诺贝尔瓷砖 | White | Nabel | 诺贝尔瓷砖 |
| 2012 | Nike | Green | Daikin | 大金空调 | White | Daikin | 大金空调 |
| 2013 | Nike | Green | 500.com | 500.com | White | 500.com | 500.com |
| 2014 | Nike | Green | Toshiba | Toshiba（第1-6轮） | White | Toshiba | Toshiba（第1-6轮） |
| 2014 | Nike | Green | Toshiba | Toshiba 东芝空调（第7-30轮） | White | Toshiba | Toshiba 东芝空调（第7-30轮） |
| 2015 | Nike | Green | Toshiba | Toshiba 东芝空调 | White | Toshiba | Toshiba 东芝空调 |
| 2016 | Nike | Green | Toshiba | Toshiba 东芝空调 | White | Toshiba | Toshiba 东芝空调 |
| 2017 | Nike | Green | Panasonic | Panasonic 松下洁乐 | White | Panasonic | Panasonic 松下洁乐 |
| 2018 | Anta | Green | Panasonic | Panasonic 松下洁乐 | White | Panasonic | Panasonic 松下洗碗机 |
| 2019 | Anta | Green | Panasonic | Panasonic 松下卫浴 | White | Panasonic | Panasonic 松下卫浴 |
| 2020 | Kelme | Green | Panasonic | Panasonic 松下电器 | White | Panasonic | Panasonic 松下电器 |
| 2021 | Kelme | Green | Panasonic | Panasonic 松下电器 | White | Panasonic | Panasonic 松下电器 |
| 2022 | Nike | Green | Panasonic | Panasonic 松下电器 | White | Panasonic | Panasonic 松下电器 |
| 2023 | Nike | Green | Panasonic | Panasonic 松下电器 | White | Panasonic | Panasonic 松下电器 |
| 2024 | Nike | Green | Leapmotor | Leapmotor 零跑汽车 | White | Leapmotor | Leapmotor 零跑汽车 |
| 2025 | Nike | Green | Leapmotor | Leapmotor 零跑汽车 | Blue | Leapmotor | Leapmotor 零跑汽车 |
| 2026 | Nike | Green | Leapmotor | Leapmotor 零跑汽车 | White | Leapmotor | Leapmotor 零跑汽车 |

== Rivals ==
Because there are not many football clubs based on Zhejiang in history, Zhejiang FC has rarely been able to have a rival in the province for a long time. In 2017, after being relegated to China League, Hangzhou Greentown briefly had a 2-seasons Zhejiang derby with Zhejiang Yiteng but only won 1 out of 4 matches. More often than not, Zhejiang FC has a stronger rivalry with other teams of the same level in the Wu Chinese region, particularly Shanghai Shenhua, and Shanghai Zhongyuan historically.
