= Wang Changtai =

Chinese footballer

Wang Changtai 王长太
Personal information
- Full name: Wang Changtai
- Date of birth: 25 March 1955 (age 71)
- Place of birth: Dalian, China
- Position: Forward

Youth career
- 1965–1970: Dalian Amateur Sports School

Senior career*
Years	Team	Apps	(Gls)
1970–1981	Liaoning team		
1981–1984	Dalian team		

International career
1977–1978	China	8	(5)

Managerial career
- 1984–1990: Dalian Women
- 1991: China Women U20
- 1998: China U20
- 1999–2000: Shaanxi Guoli
- 2001: Zhejiang Greentown (interim)
Medal record
Men's football
Representing China
Asian Games
Bronze medal – third place	1978 Bangkok	Football
- * Club domestic league appearances and goals

Wang Changtai (simplified Chinese: 王长太; traditional Chinese: 王長太; pinyin: Wáng Chǎngtài; born 25 March 1955) is a Chinese former footballer.

== Club career ==
Born in Dalian, Wang joined the Dalian Amateur Sports School in 1965. In 1970, Wang joined Liaoning, winning the 1978 Chinese National League during his time at the club. In 1981, Wang signed for Dalian Shipyard, later renamed to Dalian, winning the 1981 Yi League and the 1983 Jia-B League at the club.

== International career ==
On 19 July 1977, Wang made his debut for China, scoring in a 3–2 win against Zaire.

=== International goals ===
Scores and results list China's goal tally first.

#	Date	Venue	Opponent	Score	Result	Competition
1	19 July 1977	Workers' Stadium, Beijing, China	Zaire		3–2	Friendly
2	14 December 1978	Supachalasai Stadium, Bangkok, Thailand	Qatar	1–0	3–0	1978 Asian Games
3	19 December 1978	Chulalongkorn University Stadium, Bangkok, Thailand	Malaysia	1–0	7–1	1978 Asian Games
4	19 December 1978	Chulalongkorn University Stadium, Bangkok, Thailand	Malaysia	2–0	7–1	1978 Asian Games
5	19 December 1978	Chulalongkorn University Stadium, Bangkok, Thailand	Malaysia	7–1	7–1	1978 Asian Games

== Coaching career ==
Following his retirement in 1984, Wang took up a coaching role at Dalian's women's team. In 1991, he was appointed head coach of China's women's youth team. In 1998, he managed China's youth teams. The following year, he was appointed manager of Shaanxi Guoli, remaining with the club until 2000. During the 2001 season, he managed Zhejiang Greentown on an interim basis, following a merger with Zhejiang in 2000. At the end of the 2003 season, Wang left Zhejiang Greentown.
