= Qingdao Hainiu =

Qingdao Hainiu may reference one of the following football clubs:

- Qingdao F.C., a football club established in 2013, named Qingdao Hainiu between 2013 and 2015
- Qingdao Hainiu F.C., a football club established in 1990, formerly named Qingdao Etsong Hainiu between 1997 and 2004 and was renamed Qingdao Hainiu from 2021
