= Yang Chen (footballer, born 1989) =

Chinese footballer

Yang Chen 杨晨
Personal information
- Full name: Yang Chen
- Date of birth: 14 November 1989 (age 36)
- Place of birth: Wuhan, Hubei, China
- Height: 1.80 m (5 ft 11 in)
- Position: Midfielder

Senior career*
| Years | Team | Apps | (Gls) |
| 2009–2013 | Shanghai Shenxin | 31 | (1) |
| 2013 | → Hebei Zhongji (loan) | 19 | (9) |
| 2014–2015 | Meizhou Hakka | 16 | (1) |
| 2016–2018 | Shenzhen Ledman | 68 | (10) |
| 2019–2020 | Chengdu Better City | 19 | (0) |
- * Club domestic league appearances and goals as of 31 December 2020

Yang Chen (simplified Chinese: 杨晨; traditional Chinese: 楊晨; pinyin: Yáng Chén; born 14 November 1989) is a Chinese footballer.

== Club career ==
Yang Chen started his professional football career in 2009 when he was promoted to China League One side Nanchang Bayi Hengyuan's first team squad. On 28 March 2009, he made his senior debut in the opening match of the season which Nanchang Bayi Hengyuan beat Shanghai Zobon 3–0. He played 13 matches for the club in the 2009 season as Nanchang finished the second in the China League One and won promotion to the Chinese Super League. On 4 May 2011, Yang scored his two goals in a 3–1 win over Beijing BIT in the first round of 2011 Chinese FA Cup. He scored his first league goal on 23 October 2011 in a 3–1 away win against Shaanxi Baorong Chanba.

Yang was loaned to China League Two side Hebei Zhongji in March 2013. He was the top scorer of the league, scoring nine goals in 19 appearances as Hebei finished the runners-up in the 2013 China League Two and promoted to the second tier. Yang transferred to another League Two club Meizhou Hakka in February 2014. He played two seasons for the club and won the champions of 2015 China League Two. Yang moved to League Two new club Shenzhen Renren in 2016. He scored club's first goal in the professional league on 30 April 2016 in a 1–0 home win against Lijiang Jiayunhao.

On 21 February 2019, Yang transferred to fellow League Two side Chengdu Better City. He would go on to win promotion with the club as they came runners-up at the end of the 2019 China League Two season.

== Career statistics ==
As of 31 December 2020.

Appearances and goals by club, season and competition
| Club | Season | League | | | National Cup | | Continental | | Other | | Total | |
| Club | Season | Division | Apps | Goals | Apps | Goals | Apps | Goals | Apps | Goals | Apps | Goals |
|---|---|---|---|---|---|---|---|---|---|---|---|---|
| Shanghai Shenxin | 2009 | China League One | 13 | 0 | - | | - | | - | | 13 | 0 |
| Shanghai Shenxin | 2010 | Chinese Super League | 3 | 0 | - | | - | | - | | 3 | 0 |
| Shanghai Shenxin | 2011 | Chinese Super League | 13 | 1 | 3 | 3 | - | | - | | 16 | 4 |
| Shanghai Shenxin | 2012 | Chinese Super League | 2 | 0 | 0 | 0 | - | | - | | 2 | 0 |
| Shanghai Shenxin | 2013 | Chinese Super League | 0 | 0 | 0 | 0 | - | | - | | 0 | 0 |
| Shanghai Shenxin | Total | | 31 | 1 | 3 | 0 | 0 | 0 | 0 | 0 | 34 | 1 |
| Hebei Zhongji (loan) | 2013 | China League Two | 19 | 9 | 2 | 0 | - | | - | | 21 | 9 |
| Meizhou Hakka | 2014 | China League Two | 9 | 1 | 2 | 0 | - | | - | | 11 | 1 |
| Meizhou Hakka | 2015 | China League Two | 7 | 0 | 3 | 1 | - | | - | | 10 | 1 |
| Meizhou Hakka | Total | | 16 | 1 | 5 | 1 | 0 | 0 | 0 | 0 | 21 | 2 |
| Shenzhen Ledman | 2016 | China League Two | 19 | 1 | 1 | 0 | - | | - | | 20 | 1 |
| Shenzhen Ledman | 2017 | China League Two | 26 | 3 | 2 | 0 | - | | - | | 28 | 3 |
| Shenzhen Ledman | 2018 | China League Two | 23 | 6 | 1 | 0 | - | | - | | 24 | 6 |
| Shenzhen Ledman | Total | | 68 | 10 | 4 | 0 | 0 | 0 | 0 | 0 | 72 | 10 |
| Chengdu Better City | 2019 | China League Two | 17 | 0 | 0 | 0 | - | | - | | 17 | 0 |
| Chengdu Better City | 2020 | China League One | 2 | 0 | 0 | 0 | - | | - | | 2 | 0 |
| Chengdu Better City | Total | | 19 | 0 | 0 | 0 | 0 | 0 | 0 | 0 | 19 | 0 |
| Career total | | | 153 | 21 | 14 | 4 | 0 | 0 | 0 | 0 | 167 | 25 |

== Honours ==
=== Club ===
Meizhou Hakka

- China League Two: 2015

=== Individual ===
- China League Two top scorer: 2013
