= Qianwei Hubei University of Police F.C. =

Chinese football club

Qianwei HUP 前卫湖北警院
- Full name: Qianwei Hubei University of Police F.C. 前卫湖北警官学院足球俱乐部
- Founded: 2006; 19 years ago
- Dissolved: 2007; 18 years ago
Home colours	Away colours

Qianwei Hubei University of Police F.C. (Simplified Chinese: 前卫湖北警官学院; Hanyu Pinyin: Qiánwèi Húběi Jǐngguān Xuéyuán) is a Chinese semi-professional football club based in Wuhan city, Hubei Province, China.

Qianwei HUP F.C. was founded by the Ministry of Public Security PRC., Qianwei Sports Association and Hubei University of Police in 2006 as the third professional football club in Wuhan besides Wuhan Optics Valley and Wuhan Yaqi. Although attempted to enroll in the 2007 China League Two, their participation was denied after their entire team all failed to complete the Yo-Yo Test, and the club was soon dissolved afterwards.
