= Jiang Yuxuan =

Chinese footballer

Personal information
- Date of birth: 11 April 2005 (age 21)
- Height: 1.81 m (5 ft 11 in)
- Position: Midfielder

Team information
- Current team: Zhejiang Professional
- Number: 41

Youth career
- Zhejiang (Greentown)

Senior career*
| Years | Team | Apps | (Gls) |
| 2026– | Zhejiang Professional | 0 | (0) |

International career^{‡}
| 2024 | China U19 | | |
- * Club domestic league appearances and goals as of 20 July 2026 ‡ National team caps and goals as of 20 July 2026

Jiang Yuxuan (simplified Chinese: 姜宇轩; traditional Chinese: 姜宇軒; pinyin: Jiāng Yǔxuān; born 11 April 2005) is a Chinese professional footballer who plays as a midfielder for Chinese Super League club Zhejiang Professional.

== Club career ==
=== Zhejiang Professional ===
As of the 2026 season, Jiang wears the number 41 jersey for Zhejiang Professional in the Chinese Super League. In August 2024, he was registered as a Zhejiang U21 team player for the AFC Champions League Two.

== International career ==
In January 2024, Jiang was selected for the China U-19 national men's football team for the first training camp of 2024, held in Shenzhen from 22 January to 7 February. In July 2024, he was again selected for the U19 national team training camp in Shanxi Changzhi from 2 to 14 August, to prepare for the 2025 AFC U-20 Asian Cup. In August 2024, the China U-19 team played two friendly matches against Iran U-19 in Changzhi, winning the first 2–0 and losing the second 0–2.

== National games ==
In May 2025, Jiang was part of the Zhejiang U20 team that defeated Tianjin U20 3–0 in the qualification stage of the 15th National Games in Hangzhou.

== Career statistics ==
=== Club ===
As of 20 July 2026

Appearances and goals by club, season and competition
| Club | Season | League | | | National Cup | | Continental | | Other | | Total | |
| Club | Season | Division | Apps | Goals | Apps | Goals | Apps | Goals | Apps | Goals | Apps | Goals |
|---|---|---|---|---|---|---|---|---|---|---|---|---|
| Zhejiang Professional | 2026 | Chinese Super League | 0 | 0 | 0 | 0 | — | | — | | 0 | 0 |
| Career total | | | 0 | 0 | 0 | 0 | 0 | 0 | 0 | 0 | 0 | 0 |
