= Floris Schaap =

Dutch association football player

Personal information
- Date of birth: 3 April 1965 (age 61)
- Place of birth: Katwijk, The Netherlands
- Height: 1.82 m (5 ft 11 1/2 in)
- Position: Defender

Senior career*
Years	Team	Apps	(Gls)
1985–1986	VV Katwijk		
1986–1988	Olhanense		
1988–1991	Portimonense	103	(0)
1991–1993	União Torreense	46	(2)
1993–1995	Farense		
1995–1996	Braga	5	(0)
1996–1998	Olhanense	50	(12)
Total		204	(14)

Managerial career
- 1998–2000: Olhanense (assistant)
- 2000: Olhanense (caretaker)
- 2003: Lusitano
- 2005–2006: Silves
- 2009–2011: Sharjah (assistant)
- 2012–2013: Olhanense (assistant)
- 2013–2014: Qinghai Senke
- 2014: BEC Tero (assistant)
- 2015: Ajman Club (assistant)
- 2016: Khooneh be Khooneh (assistant)
- 2016–2017: Sichuan Longfor (assistant)
- 2018–2019: Académico Viseu (assistant)
- 2019: Académico Viseu
- * Club domestic league appearances and goals

Floris Schaap (born 3 April 1965) is a Dutch former footballer and manager.

== Career statistics ==
=== Club ===
Club	Season	League			Cup		Other		Total	
Club	Season	Division	Apps	Goals	Apps	Goals	Apps	Goals	Apps	Goals
Portimonense	1988–89	Primeira Divisão	34	0	2 (Note: Appearances in the Taça de Portugal)	1	0	0	36	1
Portimonense	1989–90	Primeira Divisão	33	0	1	0	0	0	34	0
Portimonense	1990–91	Segunda Divisão de Honra	36	0	4	0	1 (Note: Appearances in the Segunda Divisão playoffs)	0	41	0
Portimonense	Total		103	0	7	1	1	0	111	1
União Torreense	1991–92	Primeira Divisão	32	1	3	0	0	0	35	1
União Torreense	1992–93	Segunda Divisão de Honra	14	1	1	1	0	0	15	2
União Torreense	Total		46	2	4	1	0	0	50	3
Braga	1995–96	Primeira Divisão	5	0	0	0	0	0	5	0
Olhanense	1996–97	Segunda Divisão	19	3	2	0	0	0	21	3
Olhanense	1997–98	Segunda Divisão	31	9	2	1	0	0	33	10
Olhanense	Total		50	12	4	1	0	0	54	13
Career total			204	14	15	3	1	0	220	17

=== Managerial ===
As of 9 February 2019.

Managerial record by team and tenure
Team	From	To	Record				
Team	From	To	P	W	D	L	Win %
Olhanense (caretaker)	2000	2000	18	6	8	4	33.3
Lusitano	2003	2003	11	1	2	8	9.1
Silves	2005	2006	9	1	3	5	11.1
Académico Viseu	2019	2019	6	1	1	4	16.7
Total			44	9	14	21	20.5
