= Hebei Xuechi F.C. =

Hebei Xuechi 河北雪驰
- Full name: Hebei Xuechi Football Club 河北雪驰足球俱乐部
- Founded: 2003
- Dissolved: 2006
- Ground: Baoding People's Stadium; Baoding, Hebei, China
- Capacity: 13,000
- Manager: Li Qiang
Home colours	Away colours

Hebei Xuechi (Chinese: 河北雪驰) is a semi-professional Chinese football club, based in Baoding, Hebei Province.

== History ==
The club was originally founded as an undistinguished amateur club named Qingdao Zhongneng (not to be confused with the professional football club Qingdao Zhongneng, which was named Qingdao Etsong Hainiu at the time, prior to Jonoon Group's takeover of that club in 2004) in Qingdao, Shandong Province in 2003, and changed its name to Qingdao Changqing in 2004. In 2005, their name was changed again, to Qingdao Shark. In the same year, they were crowned champions of Qingdao City Football League, then participated in the North series of China Amateur Football League, and was ranked 2nd.

In 2006, the club enrolled in China League Two, and appointed former Chinese national team player Li Qiang as manager. In the middle of the season, the club moved to Baoding, Hebei Province and renamed itself Hebei Xuechi. At the end of the regular season, the team finished fourth out of the nine clubs in North division and secured a play-off spot, but lost to Anhui Jiufang in the quarterfinals. The club was dissolved afterwards.

== Name history ==
- Qingdao Zhongneng F.C. 青岛中能 2003
- Qingdao Changqing F.C. 青岛长青 2004
- Qingdao Shark F.C. 青岛海鲨 2005–2006
- Hebei Xuechi F.C. 河北雪驰 2006

== Honors ==
- Qingdao City Football League
  - Winners: 2005
