= Cai Chuchuan =

Chinese footballer

Cai Chuchuan 蔡楚川
Personal information
- Date of birth: December 15, 1983 (age 42)
- Place of birth: Wuhan, Hubei, China
- Height: 1.82 m (6 ft 0 in)
- Position: Midfielder

Team information
- Current team: Zhejiang FC (assistant coach)

Senior career*
| Years | Team | Apps | (Gls) |
| 2001–2004 | Wuhan Yaqi | | |
| 2005–2010 | Zhejiang Greentown | 76 | (13) |
| 2012 | Hangzhou Greentown | 0 | (0) |
| 2013–2014 | Tianjin Songjiang | 31 | (1) |
| 2014 | → Guizhou Zhicheng (loan) | 10 | (2) |
| 2015–2018 | Lijiang Jiayunhao | 64 | (3) |

Managerial career
- 2023–: Zhejiang FC (assistant)
- * Club domestic league appearances and goals as of 14 October 2018

Cai Chuchuan (蔡楚川; born December 15, 1983, in Wuhan) is a former Chinese football player.

== Club career ==
=== Wuhan Yaqi ===
Cai started his football career with the Wuhan Yaqi youth team where in 2000 he was considered good enough to be part of the youth team that went to Bulgaria to study abroad for more than a year where during his time studying in Europe he progressed significantly with his soccer technique. By the end of the year he graduated to the Wuhan Yaqi senior team where he continued to play for them for several seasons before he was loaned out to second-tier club Zhejiang Greentown at the beginning of the 2005 season.

=== Zhejiang Greentown ===
After a successful loan period at Zhejiang Greentown which saw them just miss out on promotion to the Chinese Super League, Cai was allowed to move permanently to Zhejiang Greentown at the beginning of the 2006 season. The 2006 season was to prove very successful for him as Zhejiang Greentown were promoted to the Chinese Super League after coming runners-up within the division. The following season Cai would be part of the squad that eventually ended the Chinese Super League 2007 season finishing eleventh. By the 2008 Chinese Super League season Cai would be an integral member of the team and would personally have his best season with the club when he would score six goals in twenty-two appearances. The next season saw him personally continue his good form by making a further twenty-eight appearances and five goals from midfield, however this wasn't enough for the club as they struggled throughout the whole season. In a bid to reverse the club's fortunes they brought in a new manager in Wu Jingui who brought in a whole host of new players in the 2010 Chinese Super League, particularly former Chinese international Li Yan who replaced him in midfield, nevertheless he still played his part aiding the team to their best league finish of fourth and a chance to play in the AFC Champions League.

Before the start of the 2011 league season his club believed they had enough cover in midfield and allowed Cai to leave the club. For the whole season Cai would be a free agent, however at the start 2012 Chinese Super League season he had the chance to join his old club Zhejiang Greentown who had now renamed themselves Hangzhou Greentown. Half-way through the league season his club decided that to gain more playing time he would be loaned out to third-tier club for the rest of the season.
