= Dongguan Dongcheng F.C. =

Chinese football club

Dongguan Dongcheng
- Full name: Dongguan Dongcheng Football Club
- Founded: 1999; 27 years ago
- Dissolved: 2005; 21 years ago
- League: Jia B League

Dongguan Dongcheng (Simplified Chinese: 东莞东城) was a football team based in Dongguan, Guangdong province, in the People's Republic of China, that played in the Chinese Football Association Jia League.

Founded on 18 December 1999, as Gansu Tianma, the club did not get promotion from the Chinese Football Association Yi League. In 2001, however, the club bought a position in the Jia League from Tianjin Lifei.

Former England international Paul Gascoigne played four games for them in 2003, scoring two goals, before returning to England after falling out with the club.

They moved to Ningbo and changed their name to Ningbo Yaoma (Simplified Chinese: 宁波耀马) in 2003, then subsequently moved to Dongguan and changed their name to Dongguan Dongcheng in 2004, and after that season they were relegated to China League Two. They were then sold to Lanwa F.C., who moved the club to the Hong Kong First Division League.

== Name Changes ==
- 1999–2003: Gansu Tianma 甘肃天马
- 2003: Ningbo Yaoma 宁波耀马
- 2004: Dongguan Dongcheng 东莞东城
- After 2004: see Lanwa FC

== See also ==
- Lanwa FC
