= Zhou Wentao =

Chinese footballer

Personal information
- Position: Forward

Team information
- Current team: Zhejiang Professional
- Number: 40

Youth career
- Zhejiang Professional

Senior career*
Years	Team	Apps	(Gls)
2022–	Zhejiang Professional	1	(0)
- * Club domestic league appearances and goals as of 20 July 2026 ‡ National team caps and goals as of 20 July 2026

Zhou Wentao (simplified Chinese: 周文涛; traditional Chinese: 周文濤; pinyin: Zhōu Wéntāo) is a Chinese professional footballer who plays as a forward for Chinese Super League club Zhejiang Professional.

== Early life and youth career ==
Zhou Wentao came through the youth academy of Zhejiang Professional (formerly known as Zhejiang Greentown). In March 2026, the club's training ground welcomed Zhou Wentao along with Ye Daoxin, Ning Fangze, Jiang Yuxuan, and Xu Junchi, all of whom came from the Greentown youth academy system.

== Club career ==
=== Zhejiang Professional ===
On 19 December 2022, in the 2022 Chinese FA Cup round of 16 match against Guangzhou City, Zhou Wentao came on as a substitute in the second half and made his first-team debut. Zhejiang won the match 3–0. At the time, he was 17 years old and part of the club's U17 youth team.

In December 2024, while playing for Zhejiang U21, Zhou Wentao scored a hat-trick in the U21 League final stage round 22 match against Cangzhou Mighty Lions, helping his team to a 3–1 victory. He was named the round's best player for his performance.

In May 2025, during the preliminary stage of the U21 League, Zhou Wentao had scored 9 goals and led the top scorers chart.

Ahead of the 2026 season, Zhou Wentao was included in the Zhejiang Professional first team squad. On 5 March 2026, Zhejiang Professional announced its squad list for the 2026 Chinese Super League season, with Zhou Wentao assigned the number 40 jersey.

== Career statistics ==
=== Club ===
As of 20 July 2026

Appearances and goals by club, season and competition
Club	Season	League			National Cup		Continental		Other		Total	
Club	Season	Division	Apps	Goals	Apps	Goals	Apps	Goals	Apps	Goals	Apps	Goals
Zhejiang Professional	2026	Chinese Super League	0	0	0	0	—		—		0	0
Career total			0	0	0	0	0	0	0	0	0	0
