= Tico (footballer, born 1977) =

Brazilian footballer

Personal information
- Full name: Alex Chandre de Oliveira
- Date of birth: 21 December 1977
- Place of birth: Curitiba, Brazil
- Date of death: 14 June 2014 (aged 36)
- Place of death: Curitiba, Brazil
- Height: 1.80 m (5 ft 11 in)
- Position: Forward

Senior career*
Years	Team	Apps	(Gls)
1996–1998	Paraná		
1999	Chengdu Wuniu		
2000	Shaanxi Guoli	15	(9)
2001	Seixal		
2002	Paraná		
2003	Daejeon Citizen	28	(4)
2004	Avaí		
2005	Montedio Yamagata	13	(2)
2005	Bahia		
2006	Zhejiang Greentown	20	(16)
2007	Avaí		
2007	Zhejiang Greentown	12	(5)
2008	São Caetano		
2009	Santa Helena		
- * Club domestic league appearances and goals as of 15 February 2010

Alex Chandre de Oliveira or simply Tico (21 December 1977 – 14 June 2014) was a Brazilian football player who played as a striker.

He played for Zhejiang Greentown between 2006 and 2007. He died of a heart attack at his home in Curitiba.
