= Liaoning Zhongba F.C. =

Chinese football club

Liaoning Zhongba 辽宁中巴
- Full name: Liaoning Zhongba FC 辽宁中巴足球俱乐部
- Ground: Zhongba Stadium, Shenyang, Liaoning, China
- Capacity: 1,000
- League: China Yi League
Home colours	Away colours

Liaoning Zhongba (Sino-Brazilian) (Simplified Chinese: 辽宁中巴) was a Chinese football club its based in Liaoning, China.
