= Yiwu Meihu Sports Centre =

Sports venue in Yiwu, Zhejiang, China

Yiwu Meihu Sports Centre (YMSC) 义乌梅湖体育中心
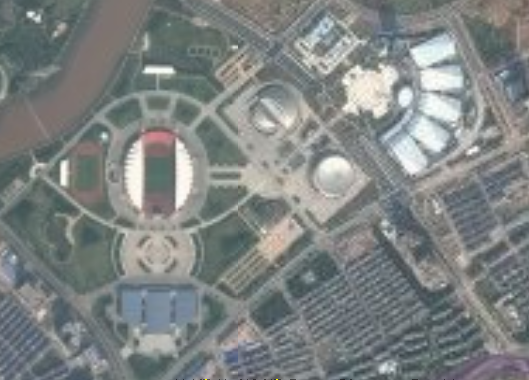
- Full name: Yiwu Meihu Sports Centre 义乌梅湖体育中心
- Location: Yiwu, Jinhua, Zhejiang, China
- Capacity: 35,260 (Meihu Stadium); 6,000 (Meihu Arena)
- Surface: Grass (Yiwu Meihu Stadium); Flooring (Meihu Arena)

Construction
- Groundbreaking: 1999
- Built: October 2001 (Yiwu Meihu Stadium); October 2005 (Meihu Arena)
- Opened: 10 October 2005 (Meihu Arena)

Tenant
- Zhejiang Chouzhou Golden Bulls (Meihu Arena)

Yiwu Meihu Sports Centre (simplified Chinese: 义乌梅湖体育中心; traditional Chinese: 义乌梅湖體育中心; pinyin: yì wū méi hú tǐ yù zhōng xīn) is a multi-purpose stadium in Yiwu, Jinhua, Zhejiang, China. The Yiwu Meihu Stadium holds 35,260 spectators and is mainly used for association football matches. The Meihu Arena holds 6,000 spectators and is mainly used for basketball games.
