= Dali Ruilong F.C. =

Dali Ruilong 大理锐龙
- Full name: Dali Ruilong Football Club 大理锐龙足球俱乐部
- Founded: ?
- Dissolved: November 2013 (11 years ago)
- Ground: Dali Stadium
- Capacity: 18,000
- Owner: Kunming Football Management Center; Yunnan Ruilong Mining Corp., Ltd

Dali Ruilong F.C. (Simplified Chinese: 大理锐龙足球俱乐部) was a football club based in Dali, Yunnan.

== History ==
The club was originally established as an undistinguished amateur side called Kunming Ruilong Football Club that had competed in the amateur competitions within the city of Kunming, and won the city league title in 2010. On 20 March 2012, they rebranded as a professional club, and registered to play within China League Two, the third tier of the Chinese football league system in the 2012 league season. In Kunming Ruilong's first League Two season, they finished 3rd place in the South Group and advanced into the Play-offs. However, they were knocked out by Qinghai Senke 3–2 on aggregate in the quarter-finals. The club moved their home stadium to Dali, another city in Yunnan, and changed their name to Dali Ruilong Football Club on 22 March 2013. After the 2013 China League Two season, they merged into Lijiang Jiayunhao and ceased their existence.

== All-time league rankings ==
Season	2012	2013
Division	3	3
Position	5	6^{1}

- ^1 in South Group
