= Guangxi Tianji F.C. =

Chinese football club

Guangxi Tianji 广西天基
- Full name: Guangxi Tianji F.C. 广西天基足球俱乐部
- Founded: 2003; 22 years ago
- Dissolved: 2008
- Ground: Liuzhou Sports Centre, Liuzhou, Guangxi, China
- Capacity: 35,000
Home colours	Away colours

Guangxi Tianji (Simplified Chinese: 广西天基) was a Chinese football club its based in Nanning, Guangxi, China. The club disbanded in 2008.

== Name history ==
- 2003–2004 Gansu Zhongyou 甘肃众友
- 2005 Karamay Petroleum 克拉玛依油龙
- 2006–2007 Guangxi Tianji 广西天基
