= Hongcheng Stadium =

Multi-purpose stadium in Qingdao, China

Coordinates: 36°05′58″N 120°21′06″E

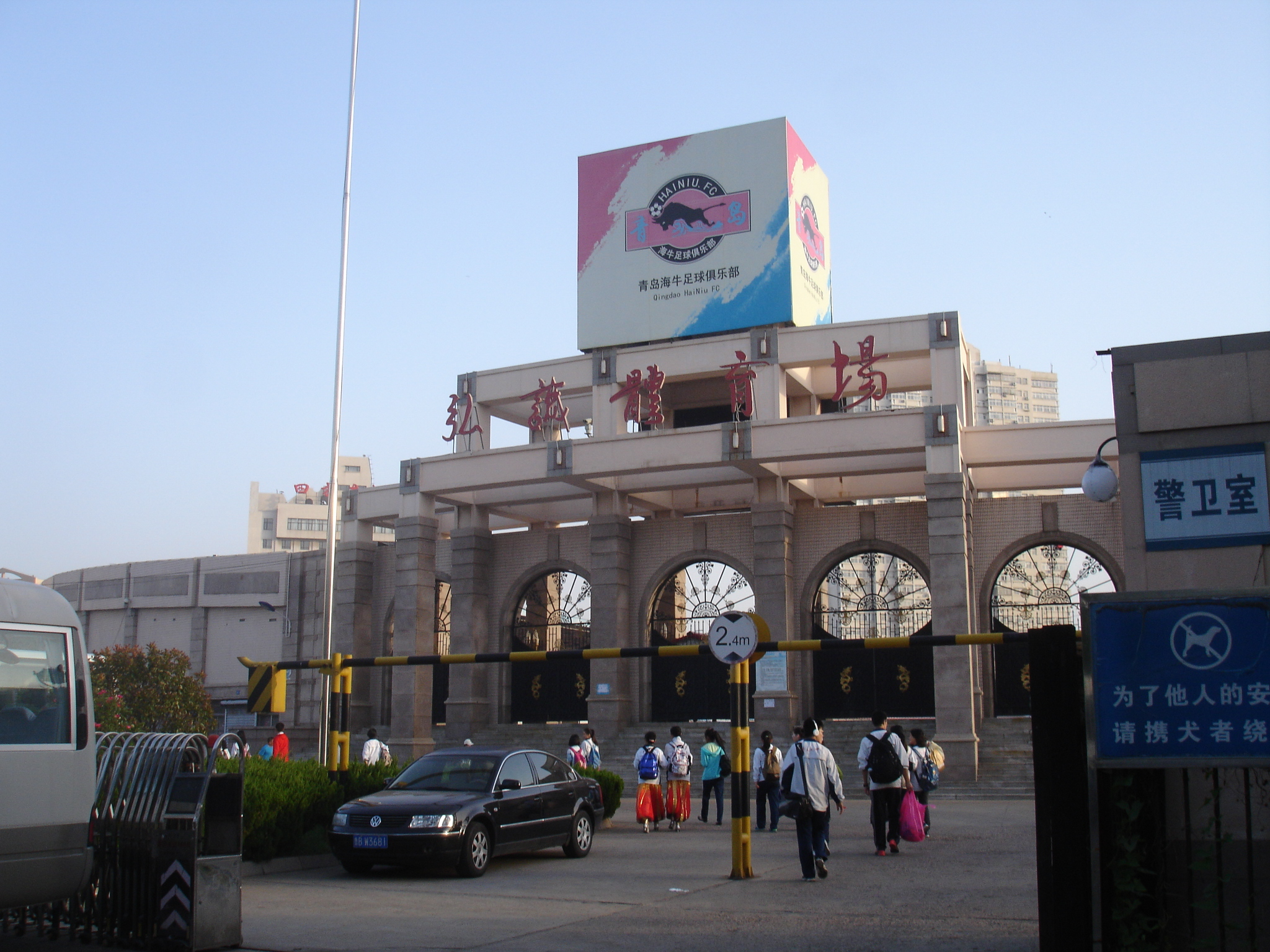
Hongcheng Stadium

Hongcheng Stadium (Simplified Chinese: 弘诚体育场) is a multi-purpose stadium in Qingdao, China. It is currently used mostly for football matches. The stadium holds 14,000 people. The stadium was built in 1999.

== See also ==
- Sports in China
