= Qingdao F.C. =

Chinese professional football club

Qingdao FC
- Full name: Qingdao Football Club
- Founded: 29 January 2013; 13 years ago
- Dissolved: 13 April 2022; 4 years ago
- Ground: Conson Stadium, Qingdao, China
- Capacity: 45,000
- Owner(s): Shenzhen Hengye Investment Group Co., ltd. (63.625%); Qingdao Huanghai Health Industry Group Co., ltd. (27%); Others (9.375%)
- 2021: Super League, 16th of 16 (relegated)
- Website: http://www.huanghaifc.com/index.aspx
Home colours	Away colours

Qingdao F.C.
- Traditional Chinese: 青島足球俱樂部
- Simplified Chinese: 青岛足球俱乐部
- Literal meaning: Qingdao Yellow Sea
Transcriptions
Standard Mandarin
- Hanyu Pinyin: Qīngdǎo Zúqiú Jùlèbù

Qingdao Football Club (Chinese: 青岛足球俱乐部) was a professional Chinese football club that participated in the Chinese Super League under licence from the Chinese Football Association (CFA). The team was based in Qingdao and their home stadium was the Qingdao Guoxin Stadium that has a seating capacity of 45,000. The club was owned by Qingdao Central Plaza Business Management Co., Ltd. who formed the team on 29 January 2013.

== History ==
=== Club history ===
Qingdao Hainiu F.C. was established on 29 January 2013 by former players and coaches from Shandong that included Qi Wusheng as chairman, Hao Haidong as managerial director and Su Maozhen as general manager. With the financial backing of 20 million Yuan from Qingdao Central Plaza Business Management Co., Ltd the club would choose the name Hainiu (海牛), which means "The Sea Bulls" despite it once being used by Qingdao Jonoon, another football club in Qingdao between 1994 and 2004, hoping to inspire the golden era of Qingdao football. On the field the team would show their dominance within the league and go through the divisions group stage undefeated, while also beating Meixian Super-X and Shenzhen Fengpeng F.C. to reach the play-off final. In the final the club would defeat Hebei Zhongji F.C. 3–1 to gain promotion to the second tier and win a million Yuan in prize money for the game with a further 3 million won throughout the season.

On 31 January 2015, Qingdao Huanghai Pharmaceutical Co., Ltd. purchased a 51% stake of the club. On 3 July 2015, Serbian player Goran Gogić collapsed and lost consciousness after a training session with the club. He died later on the same day. Qingdao Hainiu finished 11th place in the 2015 season. On 30 December 2015, Qingdao Hainiu F.C. changed their name to Qingdao Huanghai F.C. after Qingdao Huanghai Pharmaceutical Co., Ltd. took full charge of the club. Qingdao Huanghai finished level on 59 points with Tianjin Quanjian and Guizhou Zhicheng under Spanish manager Jordi Vinyals in the 2016 season, but their head-to-head points was worse than the other two clubs, thus failing to promote to the Chinese Super League.

In the following two years, the club came close to promotion each time but fell short, earning fourth place in the League One. In the 2019 China League One the club earned first place and gained promotion.

Ahead of the 2021 season, Qingdao Huanghai changed their name to Qingdao F.C.

The club dissolved after the 2021 season.

=== Ownership and naming history ===
Year	Owner	Club name	Sponsored team name
2013–14	Qingdao Central Plaza Business Management Co., Ltd.	Qingdao Hainiu F.C.	Qingdao Hainiu
2015	Qingdao Huanghai Pharmaceutical Co., Ltd.(51%); Qingdao Central Plaza Business Management Co., Ltd.(49%)	Qingdao Hainiu F.C.	Qingdao Huanghai Pharmaceutical
2016–2018	Qingdao Huanghai Pharmaceutical Co., Ltd. (90.625%); Others (9.375%)	Qingdao Huanghai F.C.	Qingdao Huanghai
2019–2020	Shenzhen Hengye Investment Group Co., ltd. (63.625%); Qingdao Huanghai Health Industry Group Co., ltd. (27%); Others (9.375%)	Qingdao Huanghai F.C.	Qingdao Huanghai Qingdao Port
2021	Shenzhen Hengye Investment Group Co., ltd. (63.625%); Qingdao Huanghai Health Industry Group Co., ltd. (27%); Others (9.375%)	Qingdao F.C.	Qingdao F.C.

== Retired numbers ==
12 – Club Supporters (the 12th Man) The number was retired in January 2016.

== Managerial history ==
- (China) Su Maozhen (29 January 2013 – 28 July 2015)
- (China) Sun Xinbo (caretaker) (28 July 2015 – 28 December 2015)
- (Spain) Jordi Vinyals (28 December 2015 – 30 July 2019)
- (Spain) Óscar Céspedes (caretaker) (30 July 2019 – 18 August 2019)
- (Spain) Juanma Lillo (18 August 2019 – 5 June 2020)
- (Spain) Óscar Céspedes (caretaker) (5 June 2020 – 22 July 2020)
- (Spain) Pablo Machín (22 July 2020 – 29 July 2020)
- (China) Yang Weijian (caretaker) (29 July 2020 - 4 August 2020)
- (China) Wu Jingui (4 August 2020 - 13 December 2021)
- (China) Yang Weijian (caretaker) (13 December 2021 - 12 January 2022)

== Club honours ==
- China League Two (tier-III)
  - Winners (1): 2013
- China League One (tier-II)
  - Winners (1): 2019

== Results ==
All-time League rankings

As of the end of 2020 season.

Year	Div	Pld	W	D	L	GF	GA	GD	Pts	Pos.	FA Cup	Super Cup	AFC	Att./G	Stadium
2013	3	19	14	5	0	36	5	31	36^{1}	W	DNQ	DNQ	DNQ	N/A	Qingdao Hongcheng Stadium
2014	2	30	7	10	13	36	47	−11	31	12	SF	DNQ	DNQ	4,229	Qingdao Conson Stadium
2015	2	30	7	12	11	26	39	−13	33	11	R2	DNQ	DNQ	5,230	Qingdao Conson Stadium
2016	2	30	19	2	9	52	42	10	59	3	R2	DNQ	DNQ	6,992	Qingdao Conson Stadium
2017	2	30	16	4	10	56	40	16	52	4	R3	DNQ	DNQ	5,997	Qingdao Conson Stadium
2018	2	30	13	10	7	63	44	19	49	4	R3	DNQ	DNQ	6,638	Qingdao Conson Stadium
2019	2	30	17	6	7	59	36	23	57	W	R4	DNQ	DNQ	13,193	Qingdao Conson Stadium
2020	1	14^{1}	2^{1}	4^{1}	8^{1}	15^{1}	27^{1}	-12^{1}	10^{1}	14	R1	DNQ	DNQ	N/A	Suzhou (Group stage) / Dalian (Relegation stage)
2021	1	22	3	2	17	13	52	-39	11	16	-	DNQ	DNQ	N/A	Guangzhou (First, Second stage) / Suzhou (Relegation stage, CSL Playoffs)

- ^1 In group stage
- ^2 The league is in progress

Key

	China top division
	China second division
	China third division
W	Winners
RU	Runners-up
3	Third place
	Relegated

- Pld = Played
- W = Games won
- D = Games drawn
- L = Games lost
- F = Goals for
- A = Goals against
- Pts = Points
- Pos = Final position
- DNQ = Did not qualify
- DNE = Did not enter
- NH = Not Held
- – = Does Not Exist
- R1 = Round 1
- R2 = Round 2
- R3 = Round 3
- R4 = Round 4
- F = Final
- SF = Semi-finals
- QF = Quarter-finals
- R16 = Round of 16
- Group = Group stage
- GS2 = Second Group stage
- QR1 = First Qualifying Round
- QR2 = Second Qualifying Round
- QR3 = Third Qualifying Round

== Notable players ==
Had international caps for their respective countries.

China

- (China) Qu Bo
- (China) Wan Houliang
- (China) Jiang Kun
- (China) Zhang Jiaqi
- (China) Deng Zhuoxiang
- (China) Wang Dong
- (China) Zou Zheng
- (China) Liu Jian
- (China) Zhu Ting

Africa

- (Cameroon) Joseph Minala
- (Cameroon) Yves Ekwalla Hermann
- (Central African Republic) Kelly Youga
- (Ivory Coast) Yaya Touré
- (Ghana) Emmanuel Agyemang-Badu

Asia

- (Chinese Taipei) Yaki Yen
- (Hong Kong) Godfred Karikari
- (South Korea) Kim Seung-Yong

Europe

- (Estonia) Vladimir Voskoboinikov
- (France) Romain Alessandrini
- (Norway) Fredrik Ulvestad
- (Portugal) Ricardo Vaz Tê
- (Serbia) Jagoš Vuković
- (Serbia) Goran Gogić
- (Serbia) Đorđe Rakić
- (Slovenia) Denis Popović
- (Spain) Martí Crespí
- (Spain) Joan Verdú
- (Spain) Francisco Sandaza

South America

- (Brazil) Cléo
- (Brazil) Yuri de Souza
