= Tianjin Lifei F.C. =

Chinese football club

Tianjin Lifei 天津立飞
- Full name: Tianjin Lifei F.C. 天津立飞足球俱乐部
- Founded: 20 January 2000; 25 years ago
- Dissolved: 2001; 24 years ago

Tianjin Lifei F.C. (Chinese: 天津立飞足球俱乐部) is a defunct Chinese football club based in Tianjin, China.

== History ==
The club was founded on 20 January 2000. They participated in the 2000 China League Two and won instant promotion to Jia B after beating Guangzhou Baiyunshan on penalties in the semi-finals. However, after only one season, they sold their entire squad as well as their place in the second-tier to Gansu Tianma and was dissolved afterwards.

== Results ==
All-time League Rankings

Season	2000	2001
Division	3	2
Position	2	11
