= 2013 China League Two =

China League Two
- Season: 2013
- Champions: Qingdao Hainiu
- Promoted: Qingdao Hainiu; Hebei Zhongji
- Matches: 112
- Goals: 275 (2.46 per match)
- Top goalscorer: (China) Yang Chen (9 goals)
- Biggest home win: Shandong Tengding 7-0 Liaoning Youth (Sept. 7th, 2013) (7 goals)
- Biggest away win: Liaoning Youth 0-9 Hebei Zhongji (Sept. 22nd, 2013) (9 goals)
- Highest scoring: Liaoning Youth 0-9 Hebei Zhongji (Sept. 22nd, 2013) (9 goals)
- Longest winning run: Qingdao Hainiu (10 matches)
- Longest unbeaten run: Qingdao Hainiu (19 matches)
- Longest winless run: Ganxu Aoxin (14 matches)
- Longest losing run: Gansu Aoxin (8 matches)

The 2013 Chinese Football Association Division Two League season is the 24th season since its establishment in 1989. It is divided into two groups, North and South. There are 15 teams participating in the league, 8 teams in North Group and 7 teams in South Group. The league is made up of two stages, the group stage and the play-off. The group stage is a double round-robin format. Each team in the group will play the other teams twice, home and away. It will start on May 4 and end on September 22. The play-off stage is a two-legged elimination. It will start in October 8. At the end of the season, the two finalists of the play-off will qualify for promotion to 2014 China League One.

== Team changes ==
=== Promotion and relegation ===
Guizhou Zhicheng as the 2012 season champion and Hubei China-Kyle as runner-up earned promotion to the 2013 China League One.

Hohhot Dongjin were relegated from 2012 China League One to 2013 China League Two North Group as the last placed team.

=== Name changes ===
==== North Group ====
Hohhot Dongjin relocated to Shenyang during the season (in July 2013) and changed its name back to Shenyang Dongjin.

==== South Group ====
Dongguan Nancheng relocated to Mei County on December 12, 2012 and changed its name to Meixian Hakka.
Kunming Ruilong relocated to Dali and changed its name to Dali Ruilong.

=== New entries ===
There are six new teams participating in 2013 China League Two. They are Gansu Aoxin, Liaoning Youth, Qingdao Hainiu, Shandong Tengding, Lijiang Jiayunhao and Meizhou Kejia.

== Clubs ==
Groups	Club	Head coach	City	Stadium	Capacity	2012 season
North	Gansu Aoxin	(China) Zhang Hui	Lanzhou	Qilihe Stadium	30,000	New
North	Hebei Zhongji	(China) Zhang Yandong	Shijiazhuang	Yutong International Sports Center	38,000	North, 1st
North	Shenyang Dongjin^{R}	(China) Zhao Faqing	Shenyang (playing in Benxi)	Hohhot City Stadium; Benxi Stadium (from Round 8)	60,000; N/A	CL1, 16th
North	Tianjin Huochetou	(China) Su Wei	Tianjin	Tianjin Huochetou Stadium	12,000	North, 11th
North	Liaoning Youth	(Japan) Yasuharu Kurata	Benxi	Benxi Stadium	N/A	New
North	Qingdao Hainiu	(China) Su Maozhen	Qingdao	Hongcheng Stadium	19,000	New
North	Qinghai Senke	(Netherlands) (Portugal) Floris Schaap	Xining	Xining Ximen Stadium	N/A	North, 2nd
North	Shandong Tengding	(China) Luo Dengren	Tengzhou	Tengzhou Olympic Sports Center	N/A	New
South	Dali Ruilong	(China) Gao Fulin	Dali	Dali Stadium	N/A	South, 3rd
South	Jiangxi Liansheng	(China) Li Xiao	Nanchang	Jiangxi Olympic Sports Center	50,000	South, 8th
South	Lijiang Jiayunhao	(China) Niu Hongli	Lijiang	Lijiang Sports Development Center Stadium	N/A	New
South	Meixian Hakka	(Japan) Hirokazu Sakuma	Mei County	Meixian Tsang Hin-chi Stadium	20,000	South, 6th
South	Meizhou Kejia	(China) Cao Yang	Wuhua	Meixian Tsang Hin-chi Stadium; Wuhua County Stadium (from Round 12)	20,000; 6,800	New
South	Shaanxi Laochenggen	(China) Zhang Yuede	Xi'an	Shaanxi Province Stadium	50,100	North, 4th
South	Shenzhen Fengpeng	(China) Zhu Bo	Shenzhen	Universiade Center	60,334	South, 2nd

== Group stage standings ==
=== North Group ===
Pos	Team	Pld	W	D	L	GF	GA	GD	Pts	Qualification
1	Qingdao Hainiu (C, P, Q)	14	11	3	0	26	2	+24	36	Qualification for Play-offs
2	Hebei Zhongji (P, Q)	14	9	4	1	34	7	+27	31	Qualification for Play-offs
3	Qinghai Senke (Q)	14	6	5	3	20	9	+11	23	Disbanded after season
4	Shandong Tengding (Q)	14	5	6	3	17	6	+11	21	Qualification for Play-offs
5	Shenyang Dongjin	14	4	4	6	14	21	−7	16	
6	Tianjin Huochetou	14	3	6	5	7	11	−4	15	
7	Liaoning Youth	14	1	4	9	9	42	−33	7	Disbanded after season
8	Gansu Aoxin	14	0	2	12	7	36	−29	2	Disbanded after season

Updated to match(es) played on Sept. 22, 2013. Source: CL2 website on sohu.com (in Chinese)
Rules for classification: 1) points; 2) head-to-head points; 3) head-to-head goal difference; 4) head-to-head goals scored; 5) goal difference; 6) number of goals scored.
(C) Champions; (P) Promoted to China League One; (Q) Qualification for play-offs

=== South Group ===
Pos	Team	Pld	W	D	L	GF	GA	GD	Pts	Qualification
1	Meizhou Kejia (Q)	12	9	3	0	30	6	+24	30	Qualification for Play-offs
2	Shenzhen Fengpeng (Q)	12	7	3	2	19	14	+5	24	Disbanded after season
3	Lijiang Jiayunhao (Q)	12	7	1	4	17	9	+8	22	Qualification for Play-offs
4	Meixian Hakka (Q)	12	4	3	5	11	14	−3	15	Qualification for Play-offs
5	Jiangxi Liansheng	12	2	6	4	9	14	−5	12	
6	Dali Ruilong	12	1	3	8	7	26	−19	6 (Note: Dali 2-1 Shaanxi; Shaanxi 1-1 Dali)	Disbanded after season
7	Shaanxi Laochenggen	12	1	3	8	11	21	−10	6	Disbanded after season

Updated to match(es) played on Sept. 23, 2013. Source: CL2 website on sohu.com (in Chinese)
Rules for classification: 1) points; 2) head-to-head points; 3) head-to-head goal difference; 4) head-to-head goals scored; 5) goal difference; 6) number of goals scored.
(Q) Qualification for play-offs

== Group stage results ==
=== North Group ===
Home \ Away	GSA	HBZ	SYD	TJH	LNY	QDH	QHS	SDT
Gansu Aoxin		0–4	1–2	0–1	1–1	0–1	2–3	0–3
Hebei Zhongji	6–0		2–0	2–0	2–2	0–2	2–1	0–0
Shenyang Dongjin	3–1	0–2		1–1	1–0	0–3	2–2	2–1
Tianjin Huochetou	1–1	0–2	2–0		1–0 (Note: This match has been played in Benxi Stadium.)	1–2	0–0	0–1
Liaoning Youth	3–1	0–9	3–3	0–0		0–2	0–4	0–2
Qingdao Hainiu	5–0	0–0	2–0	2–0	4–0		2–1	1–0
Qinghai Senke	2–0	0–1	1–0	0–0	5–0	0–0		1–0
Shandong Tengding	1–0	2–2	0–0	0–0	7–0	0–0	0–0	

Updated to match(es) played on Sept. 22nd, 2013. Source: China League Two Results on 7m.cn (in Chinese)
Legend: Blue = home team win; Yellow = draw; Red = away team win.

=== South Group ===
Home \ Away	DLR	JXL	LJJ	MXH	MZK	SXL	SZF
Dali Ruilong		0–0	0–2	0–1	1–3	2–1	0–3
Jiangxi Liansheng	1–1		0–0	1–0	0–0	2–3	1–1
Lijiang Jiayunhao	2–0	2–0		2–0	0–1	3–1	2–0
Meixian Hakka	5–2	2–1	1–0		0–0	1–1	0–2
Meizhou Kejia	5–0	4–0	3–2	3–0		2–1	6–1
Shaanxi Laochenggen	1–1	0–2	1–2	0–0	0–2		1–2
Shenzhen Fengpeng	2–0	1–1	2–0	2–1	1–1	2–1	

Updated to match(es) played on Sept. 23rd, 2013. Source: China League Two Results on 7m.cn (in Chinese)
Legend: Blue = home team win; Yellow = draw; Red = away team win.

== Play-offs ==
=== Quarter-finals ===
Team 1	Agg.	Team 2	1st leg	2nd leg
Meixian Hakka	0 - 4	Qingdao Hainiu	0 - 0	0 - 4
Qinghai Senke	1 - 5	Shenzhen Fengpeng	1 - 2	0 - 3
Shandong Tengding	3 - 2	Meizhou Kejia	2 - 0	1 - 2
Lijiang Jiayunhao	2 - 3	Hebei Zhongji	2 - 0	0 - 3

==== First leg ====
Oct. 8th, 2013
15:00 UTC+8

Meixian Hakka	0 - 0	Qingdao Hainiu
	Report

Meixian Tsang Hin-chi Stadium, Meizhou
Referee: Zhou Gang

Oct. 8th, 2013
15:00 UTC+8

Qinghai Senke	1 - 2	Shenzhen Fengpeng
Cui Yu 51'	Report	15' Chen Zewen; 82' Zhang Hongbin

Xining Ximen Stadium, Xining
Referee: Hei Xiaohu

Oct. 9th, 2013
15:00 UTC+8

Shandong Tengding	2 - 0	Meizhou Kejia
Wang Dong 35'; Liu Yunfei 38'	Report

Tengzhou Olympic Sports Center, Tengzhou
Referee: Wang Jin

Oct. 9th, 2013
15:00 UTC+8

Lijiang Jiayunhao	2 - 0	Hebei Zhongji
Gu Wenxiang 56'; Tan Tiancheng 68'	Report

Lijiang Sports Development Center Stadium, Lijiang
Referee: Li Jun

==== Second leg ====
Oct. 13th, 2013
14:00 UTC+8

Qingdao Hainiu	4 - 0	Meixian Hakka
Wang Xuanhong 22', 87'; Li Kai 31', 49'	Report

Hongcheng Stadium, Qingdao
Referee: Li Haihe

Oct. 13th, 2013
14:00 UTC+8

Shenzhen Fengpeng	3 - 0 Awarded	Qinghai Senke
Tang Miao 24'; Cai Xi 51'	Report	9' Cui Yu; (yellow card) (yellow-red card) Liu Cheng; (yellow card) (yellow-red card) 60' Cui Yu; (red card) 61' Wang Chi; (red card) 66' Song Chen; (red card) 66' Huang Chao

Universiade Center, Shenzhen
Referee: Chen Gang

Oct. 14th, 2013
14:00 UTC+8

Meizhou Kejia	2 - 1	Shandong Tengding
Chang Lin 36'; Ye Weichao 90+3'	Report	53' Liu Pujin

Wuhuaxian Stadium, Meizhou
Referee: Zhong Jun

Oct. 14th, 2013
14:00 UTC+8

Hebei Zhongji	3 - 0	Lijiang Jiayunhao
Xian Tao 40', 67'; Wu Dingmao 55'	Report

Yutong International Sports Center, Shijiazhuang
Referee: Zhao Zhizhi

=== Semi-finals ===
Team 1	Agg.	Team 2	1st leg	2nd leg
Shenzhen Fengpeng	2 - 3	Qingdao Hainiu	2 - 2	0 - 1
Hebei Zhongji	2 - 1	Shandong Tengding	2 - 0	0 - 1

==== First leg ====
Oct. 19th, 2013
14:00 UTC+8

Shenzhen Fengpeng	2 - 2	Qingdao Hainiu
Hou Zhe 9'; Chen Zewen 58'	Report	36' Li Kai; 80' Wang Jian

Universiade Center, Shenzhen
Referee: Wang Jin

Oct. 20th, 2013
14:00 UTC+8

Hebei Zhongji	2 - 0	Shandong Tengding
Hao Shuang 12'; Wu Dingmao 45+2'	Report

Yutong International Sports Center, Shijiazhuang
Referee: Huang Yejun

==== Second leg ====
Oct. 25th, 2013
14:00 UTC+8

Qingdao Hainiu	1 - 0	Shenzhen Fengpeng
Yu Guijun 48'	Report

Hongcheng Stadium, Qingdao
Referee: Li Jun

Oct. 27th, 2013
14:00 UTC+8

Shandong Tengding	1 - 0	Hebei Zhongji
Wang Dong 14'	Report

Tengzhou Olympic Sports Center, Tengzhou
Referee: Fan Qi

=== Third-Place Match ===
Nov. 1st, 2013
14:00 UTC+8

Shenzhen Fengpeng	4 - 1	Shandong Tengding
Li Xin 14'; Fan Zhiqiang 24', 39'; Pang Haitao 50'	Report	54' Zhao Wan

Universiade Center, Shenzhen
Referee: Tao Rancheng

=== Final Match ===
Nov. 3rd, 2013
14:00 UTC+8

Qingdao Hainiu	3 - 1	Hebei Zhongji
Xue Ya'nan 14'; Wang Xuanhong 63'; Wang Xiang 79' (o.g.)	Report	2' Jia Xiaochen

Hongcheng Stadium, Qingdao
Referee: Ma Ning

== Top scorers ==
Rank	Player	Club	Total
1	(China) Yang Chen	Hebei Zhongji	9
2	(China) Wang Dong	Shandong Tengding	8
2	(China) Gao Zhilin	Meizhou Kejia	8
4	(China) Wang Jian	Qingdao Hainiu	7
4	(China) Wang Xuanhong	Qingdao Hainiu	7
6	(China) Li Kai	Qingdao Hainiu	6
6	(China) Zhang Hongbin	Shenzhen Fengpeng	6
6	(China) Xu Yihai	Qinghai Senke	6
9	(China) Ye Weichao	Meizhou Kejia	5
9	(China) Pan Jia	Meizhou Kejia	5
9	(China) Wu Dingmao	Hebei Zhongji	5
