= Wuhan Yaqi F.C. =

Chinese football club

Wuhan Yaqi 武汉雅琪
- Full name: Wuhan Yaqi FC 武汉雅琪足球俱乐部
- Founded: 28 February 1996; 29 years ago
- Dissolved: 2007; 18 years ago
- Ground: Wuhan, China
Home colours	Away colours

Wuhan Yaqi Football Club (Chinese: 武汉雅琪足球俱乐部) was a Chinese football club its based in Wuhan, Hubei province, China. After a disappointing 2006 China League Two season, it was disbanded in April 2007.

== Name history ==
- 1996–1998 Anhui Lepusheng F.C. 安徽乐普生
- 1999–2007 Wuhan Yaqi F.C. 武汉雅琪

== Results ==
- As of the end of 2006 season

All-time League Rankings

Season	1996	1997	1998	1999	2003	2004	2005	2006
Division	3	3	3	3	3	3	3	3
Position	4^{1}	5^{1}	5	9	4^{1}	6^{1}	5^{1}	5

- ^1 in group stage
