= China League Two =

Association football league in China

- Organising body: Chinese Professional Football League
- Founded: 1989; 37 years ago (as level 3); 1956 (as level 2)
- Country: China
- Confederation: AFC
- Number of clubs: 24 (2025)
- Level on pyramid: 3
- Promotion to: China League One
- Relegation to: Chinese Champions League
- Domestic cup: Chinese FA Cup
- Current champions: Guangxi Hengchen (2025)
- Broadcaster(s): PPTV (live streaming)
- Website: cfl-china.cn
- Current: 2026 China League Two

The Chinese Football League 2 (Chinese: 中国足球乙级联赛), or China League Two, is the third-tier association football league of the People's Republic of China. The league is under the auspices of the Chinese Football Association and operated by the Chinese Professional Football League (CFL). Above League Two are China League One and the Chinese Super League.

The league below China League Two is the Chinese Champions League.

There are two groups in League Two, northern and southern. The top four teams from each group enter the promotion play-off after each regular season. Harbin Songbei Yiteng and Chongqing F.C. reached promotion play-off final in 2011 and the two clubs were promoted to League One. In 2011, China League Two 3rd-placed team faced 2011 China League One last-placed team for a play-off match. Fujian Smart Hero which was the 3rd-placed team of 2011 China League Two has won this match against the 2011 China League One last-placed team Guizhou Zhicheng and earned a spot in the 2012 China League One.

== History ==
The Chinese Football Association League 2 (abbreviation: China League 2) is the third level of the Chinese Football Professional League organized by the Chinese Football Association, after the Chinese Football Association Super League, before the Chinese Football Association B League, formerly known as the China Football League B.

In 1987, due to the year of the National Games and the national team's impact on the Olympic Games, the Chinese Football Association tried to divide the national football league into A and B groups, and in 1989 the A and B leagues were officially established, in 1994 the 1 and 2 leagues were professionalized, and in 2004 the A and B leagues were reorganized into the China League 1 League.

In 2022, the policy will change, and the Chinese Super League and China League One will implement a "3 up, 3 down" policy in the 3 seasons. Rules: 16th, 17th and 18th places in the Chinese Super League are directly relegated to the Chinese League One, while the 1st, 2nd and 3rd places in the Chinese League One are directly promoted to the Chinese Super League. This didn't apply to China League One and League Two, however.

== Current clubs ==
Club		Home City	Stadium	Capacity	Seasons in League Two	Spell in level 3	Head coach
Club name	Name in Chinese	Home City	Stadium	Capacity	Seasons in League Two	Spell in level 3	Head coach
Beijing Institute of Technology	北京理工	Beijing	BIT Eastern Athletic Field	5,000	2006, 2016 to 2020, 2023 to 2025	from 2023	(China) Yu Fei
Changchun Xidu	长春喜都	Changchun				from 2025	(China) Li Bin
Chengdu Rongcheng B	成都蓉城B	Chengdu				from 2025	(China) Xu Jianye
Ganzhou Ruishi	赣州瑞狮	Dingnan	Dingnan Youth Football Training Center	12,000	2022 to 2025	from 2022	(Serbia) Dragan Stančić
Guangdong Mingtu	广东铭途	Guangzhou	Zhaoqing New District Sports Center Stadium	20,000	2025	from 2025	(Japan) Tsutomu Takahata
Guangxi Hengchen	广西恒宸	Nanning	Guangxi Sports Center	60,000	2024 to 2025	from 2024	(China) Liu Junwei
Guangxi Lanhang	广西蓝航	Laibin	Baise Sports Center Stadium	20,000	2023 to 2025	from 2023	(China) Gong Lei
Guangzhou Dandelion Alpha	广州蒲公英	Guangzhou	Zengcheng Stadium	12,000	2025	from 2025	(China) Tan Ende
Guizhou Guiyang Athletic	贵州贵阳竞技	Guiyang	Guiyang Olympic Sports Center	51,636	2025	from 2025	(China) Zhu Jiong
Hangzhou Linping Wuyue	杭州临平吴越	Hangzhou	Linping Sports Centre Stadium	10,200	2024 to 2025	from 2024	(China) Xu Lei
Hubei Istar	湖北青年星	Wuhan	Xinhua Road Sports Center	22,137	2019 to 2025	from 2019	(China) Gao Feng
Jiangxi Lushan	江西庐山	Ruichang	Ruichang Sports Park Stadium	13,188	2012 to 2014, 2016 to 2019, 2025	from 2025	(China) Wang Bo
Kunming City	昆明城星	Kunming			2022 to 2025	from 2022	(Germany) Michael Weiß
Lanzhou Longyuan Athletic	兰州陇原竞技	Lanzhou	Lanzhou Olympic Center Stadium	60,000	2024 to 2025	from 2024	(South Korea) Shin Hong-gi
Nantong Haimen Codion	南通海门珂缔缘	Nantong	Haimen Sports Centre	15,000	2022 to 2025	from 2022	(China) Lu Qiang
Quanzhou Yassin	泉州亚新	Jinjiang	Jinjiang Football Training Center	8,000	2021 to 2025	from 2021	(China) Yang Xiaoqi
Shandong Taishan B	山东泰山B	Jinan	Zoucheng Sports Centre Stadium	30,000	2024 to 2025	from 2024	(China) Han Peng
Shanghai Port B	上海海港B	Shanghai	Jinshan Sports Centre	30,000	2024 to 2025	from 2024	(China) Chen Xufeng
Shanxi Chongde Ronghai	山西崇德荣海	Taiyuan			2024 to 2025	from 2024	(China) Yu Ming
Shenzhen 2028	深圳二零二八	Shenzhen			2025	from 2025	(China) Wang Baoshan
Tai'an Tiankuang	泰安天贶	Tai'an	Taishan Stadium	32,000	2022 to 2025	from 2024	(China) Yuan Weiwei
Wenzhou Professional	温州职业	Wenzhou	Wenzhou Olympic Sports Center Stadium	50,000	2021 to 2025	from 2021	(Macau) Carlos Leonel
Wuhan Three Towns B	武汉三镇B	Wuhan			2025	from 2025	(China) Jiang Kun
Wuxi Wugo	无锡吴钩	Wuxi	Wuxi Sports Center	28,000	2021 to 2022, 2025	from 2025	(South Korea) Kim Bong-gil

== Former clubs ==
Club		Seasons in League Two	Best finish	Worst finish	Current league
Pinyin name	Chinese name	Seasons in League Two	Best finish	Worst finish	Current league
Dalian Zhixing	大连智行	2023	2nd, 2023		Chinese Super League
Yunnan Yukun	云南玉昆	2023	3rd, 2023		Chinese Super League
Qingdao Youth Island	青岛青春岛	2020 to 2021	4th, 2021	8th, 2020	Chinese Super League
Wuhan Three Towns	武汉三镇	2019 to 2020	1st, 2020	11th, 2019	Chinese Super League
Chengdu Better City	成都兴城	2019	2nd, 2019		Chinese Super League
Sichuan Jiuniu	四川九牛	2018 to 2019	8th, 2019	24th, 2018	Chinese Super League
Meizhou Kejia	梅州客家	2013 to 2015	1st, 2015	5th, 2013	Chinese Super League
Qingdao Hainiu	青岛海牛	2013	1st, 2013		Chinese Super League
Shanghai East Asia	上海东亚	2006 to 2007	1st, 2007	South 7th, 2006	Chinese Super League
Zhejiang Green Town	浙江绿城	1999 to 2000	8th, 2000	Group 5th, 1999	Chinese Super League
Changchun Yatai	长春亚泰	1997, 1999	5th, 1999	6th, 1997	Chinese Super League
Henan Construction	河南建业	1995, 1999	1st, 1999	2nd, 1995	Chinese Super League
Shandong	山东	1991	1st, 1991		Chinese Super League
Guangdong GZ-Power	广东广州豹	2024	1st, 2024		China League One
Dalian K'un City	大连鲲城	2024	2nd, 2024		China League One
Shenzhen Juniors	深圳青年人	2024	3rd, 2024		China League One
Shaanxi Union	陕西联合	2024	4th, 2024		China League One
Chongqing Tonglianglong	重庆铜梁龙	2023	1st, 2023		China League One
Qingdao Red Lions	青岛红狮	2019 to 2023	4th, 2023	24th, 2019	China League One
Yanbian Longding	延边龙鼎	2021 to 2022	3rd, 2022	12th, 2021	China League One
Dongguan United	东莞莞联	2021 to 2022	4th, 2022	8th, 2021	China League One
Hebei Jingying Zhihai	河北精英志海	2021	2nd, 2021		China League One
Shanghai Jiading Huilong	上海嘉定汇龙	2020 to 2021	7th, 2020, 2021		China League One
Nanjing Fengfan	南京枫帆	2020	3rd, 2020		China League One
Guangxi Pingguo Haliao	广西平果哈嘹	2019 to 2021	3rd, 2021	27th, 2019	China League One
Shenyang Urban	沈阳城市	2016 to 2019	1st, 2019	12th, 2017	China League One
Suzhou Dongwu	苏州东吴	2016 to 2019	4th, 2019	14th, 2016	China League One
Jiangxi Liansheng	江西联盛	2012 to 2014, 2016 to 2019	1st, 2014	22nd, 2018	China League One
Shaanxi Chang'an Athletic	陕西长安竞技	2017 to 2018	3rd, 2018	7th, 2017	China League One
Nantong Zhiyun	南通支云	2015 to 2018	2nd, 2018	16th, 2016	China League One
Heilongjiang Lava Spring	黑龙江火山鸣泉	2015 to 2017	1st, 2017	North 5th, 2016	China League One
Inner Mongolia Caoshangfei	内蒙古草上飞	2015 to 2022	12th, 2017	29th, 2019	Chinese Champions League
China U-20	U20国家足球队	2021	11th, 2021		Inactive
Hangzhou Wuyue Qiantang	杭州吴越钱唐	2019	21st, 2019		Inactive
Shaanxi Laochenggen	陕西老城根	2012 to 2013	8th, 2012	South 7th, 2013	Inactive
Sichuan F.C.	四川FC	2006 to 2007, 2010 to 2012	2nd, 2007	South 11th, 2011	Inactive
Qingdao QUST	青岛青科	2009 to 2011	8th, 2011	North 7th, 2009	Inactive
Hunan Billows	湖南湘涛	2007 to 2009, 2017 to 2024	1st, 2009	15th, 2019	Defunct
Wuhan Jiangcheng	武汉江城	2022 to 2023	11th, 2022	14th, 2021	Defunct
Zibo Qisheng	淄博齐盛	2022 to 2023	16th, 2022		Defunct
Jinan Xingzhou	济南兴洲	2022	1st, 2022		Defunct
Zhuhai Qin'ao	珠海琴澳	2022	7th, 2022		Defunct
Dandong Tengyue	丹东腾跃	2021 to 2022	2nd, 2022	20th, 2021	Defunct
Xiamen Egret Island	厦门鹭岛	2021	5th, 2021		Defunct
Sichuan Minzu	四川民足	2021	17th, 2021		Defunct
Shaanxi Warriors Beyond	陕西俑士超越	2020 to 2021	13 th, 2020	24th, 2021	Defunct
Shanxi Longjin	山西龙晋	2019 to 2021	6th, 2021	32th, 2019	Defunct
Xi'an Wolves	西安骏狼	2019 to 2021	12th, 2020	30th, 2019	Defunct
Kunming Zheng He Shipman	昆明郑和船工	2019 to 2021	9th, 2020	32th, 2019	Defunct
Hebei Zhuoao	河北卓奥	2014 to 2021	5th, 2019	16th, 2020	Defunct
Shaoxing Keqiao Yuejia	绍兴柯桥越甲	1989, 1991, 1994, 1996 to 1999, 2006, 2009 to 2011, 2019 to 2021	1st, 2011	22nd, 2021	Defunct
Zibo Cuju	淄博蹴鞠	2018 to 2020	2nd, 2020	19th, 2018	Defunct
Shenzhen Bogang	深圳壆岗	2020	10th, 2020		Defunct
Yancheng Luzhiying	盐城鹿之瀛	2014 to 2020	4th, 2018	18th, 2016	Defunct
Kunshan F.C.	昆山FC	2017 to 2019	9th, 2019	21st, 2017	Defunct
Taizhou Yuanda	泰州远大	2019	3rd, 2019		Defunct
Lhasa Urban Construction Investment	拉萨城投	2019	26th, 2019		Defunct
Nanjing Shaye	南京沙叶	2019	23rd, 2019		Defunct
Fujian Tianxin	福建天信	2018 to 2019	7th, 2018	13th, 2019	Defunct
Shenzhen Pengcheng	深圳鹏城	2018 to 2019	17th, 2019	18th, 2018	Defunct
Yanbian Beiguo	延边北国	2018 to 2019	18th, 2019	23rd, 2018	Defunct
Dalian Chanjoy	大连千兆	2017 to 2019	12th, 2019	17th, 2017, 2018	Defunct
Jilin Baijia	吉林百嘉	2017 to 2019	14th, 2018	22nd, 2019	Defunct
Baoding Yingli ETS	保定英利易通	2015 to 2016, 2018 to 2019	2nd, 2016	25th, 2019	Defunct
Yinchuan Helanshan	银川贺兰山	2014 to 2019	3rd, 2017	North 7th, 2015	Defunct
Anhui Hefei Guiguan	安徽合肥桂冠	2018	27th, 2018		Defunct
Shanghai Sunfun	上海申梵	2017 to 2018	18th, 2017	26th, 2018	Defunct
Shenzhen Ledman	深圳人人雷曼	2016 to 2018	4th, 2017	11th, 2016	Defunct
Hainan Boying	海南博盈	2016 to 2018	16th, 2018	22nd, 2017	Defunct
Sichuan Longfor	四川隆发	2014 to 2018	1st, 2018	South 6th, 2014	Defunct
Yunnan Flying Tigers	云南飞虎	2013 to 2016, 2018	1st, 2016	20th, 2018	Defunct
Shenyang Dongjin	沈阳东进	1996, 2000 to 2006, 2008, 2013 to 2018	1st, 2008	28th, 2018	Defunct
Chengdu Qbao	成都钱宝	2014 to 2017	4th, 2015	10th, 2017	Defunct
Shanghai JuJu Sports	上海聚运动	2014 to 2017	South 6th, 2015	20th, 2016	Defunct
Meizhou Meixian Techand	梅州梅县铁汉	2005, 2011 to 2017	2nd, 2017	South 6th, 2012	Defunct
Tianjin Huochetou	天津火车头	1989, 1998, 2004 to 2010, 2012 to 2016	2nd, 1989	South 11th, 2012	Defunct
Dalian Transcendence	大连超越	2014 to 2015	2nd, 2015	5th, 2014	Defunct
Guizhou Zhicheng	贵州智诚	2008 to 2010, 2012, 2014	1st, 2012	8th, 2008	Defunct
Sichuan Leaders	四川力达士	2014	South 7th, 2014		Defunct
Shandong Tengding	山东滕鼎	2013 to 2014	4th, 2013	North 8th, 2014	Defunct
Taiyuan Zhongyou Jiayi	太原中优嘉怡	2012, 2014	2nd, 2014	North 9th, 2012	Defunct
Shenzhen Fengpeng	深圳风鹏	2012 to 2013	3rd, 2012, 2013		Defunct
Qinghai Senke	青海森科	2012 to 2013	4th, 2012	7th, 2013	Defunct
Dali Ruilong	大理锐龙	2012 to 2013	5th, 2012	South 6th, 2013	Defunct
Hebei Zhongji	河北中基	2011 to 2013	2nd, 2013	North 5th, 2011	Defunct
Hubei China-Kyle	湖北华凯尔	2012	2nd, 2012		Defunct
Xinjiang Begonia	新疆海棠	2012	North 5th, 2012		Defunct
Shanghai Zobon	上海中邦	2004, 2011 to 2012	1st, 2004	North 6th, 2012	Defunct
Fujian Smart Hero	福建骏豪	2011	3rd, 2011		Defunct
Chongqing F.C.	重庆FC	2011	2nd, 2011		Defunct
Dalian Aerbin	大连阿尔滨	2010	1st, 2010		Defunct
Wenzhou Provenza	温州葆隆	2008 to 2010	South 5th, 2009, 2010	South 6th, 2008	Defunct
Tianjin Songjiang	天津松江	2007 to 2010	2nd, 2010	North 5th, 2007	Defunct
Beijing Baxy&Shengshi	北京八喜盛世	2009	3rd, 2009		Defunct
Hubei Luyin	湖北绿茵	2009	2nd, 2009		Defunct
Ningbo Huaao	宁波华奥	2006 to 2009	8th, 2006	South 7th, 2008	Defunct
Shijiazhuang Tiangong	石家庄天工	2008	7th, 2008		Defunct
Zhanjiang Tiandi No.1	湛江天地壹号	2008	South 8th, 2008		Defunct
Guangdong Sunray Cave	广东日之泉	2007 to 2008	2nd, 2008	South 7th, 2007	Defunct
Tianjin Dongli	天津东丽	2006 to 2008	7th, 2007	North 7th, 2006, 2008	Defunct
Xinjiang Sport Lottery	新疆体彩	2006 to 2008	10th, 2007	North 6th, 2006, 2008	Defunct
Suzhou Trips	苏州趣普仕	2005 to 2008	South 5th, 2008	South 8th, 2005, 2006	Defunct
Guangxi Tianji	广西天基	2006 to 2007	4th, 2007	South 6th, 2006	Defunct
Qingdao Liming	青岛黎明	2005 to 2007	North 7th, 2005	North 8th, 2006, 2007	Defunct
Zhenjiang Groupway	镇江中安	2004, 2007	North 7th, 2007	South 8th, 2004	Defunct
Anhui Jiufang	安徽九方	2003 to 2007	3rd, 2006, 2007	South 11th, 2004	Defunct
Hebei Xuechi	河北雪驰	2006	7th, 2006		Defunct
Beijing Bus	北京巴士	2006	North 5th, 2006		Defunct
Liaoning Zhongba	辽宁中巴	2005 to 2006	North 5th, 2005	North 9th, 2006	Defunct
Yunnan Lijiang Dongba	云南丽江东巴	2004 to 2006	3rd, 2004	7th, 2005	Defunct
Wuhan Yaqi	武汉雅琪	1996 to 1999, 2003 to 2006	5th, 1998, 2006	South 6th, 2004	Defunct
Nanchang Bayi Hengyuan	南昌八一衡源	2003 to 2005	1st, 2005	6th, 2004	Defunct
Xizang Huitong Luhua	西藏惠通陆华	2002 to 2005	6th, 2005	16th, 2002	Defunct
Beijing Hongdeng	北京宏登	2001 to 2005	2nd, 2005	Group 6th, 2001	Defunct
Yanbian F.C.	延边FC	1989 to 1990, 2001 to 2004	1st, 1990	7th, 2001	Defunct
Dalian Sundy	大连三德	2002 to 2003	1st, 2003	3rd, 2002	Defunct
Dalian Sidelong	大连赛德隆	2001	2nd, 2001		Defunct
Gansu Tianma	甘肃天马	2000 to 2001	4th, 2001	Group 4th, 2000	Defunct
Qingdao Hailifeng	青岛海利丰	1995 to 2001	3rd, 1999	Group 5th, 1996, 2000	Defunct
Tianjin Lifei	天津立飞	2000	2nd, 2000		Defunct
Shanghai 02	上海02	2000	4th, 2000		Defunct
Guangzhou Baiyunshan	广州白云山	1998, 2000	1st, 1998	3rd, 2000	Defunct
Jiangsu Gige	江苏加佳	1997	1st, 1997		Defunct
Chengdu F.C.	成都FC	1996 to 1997	2nd, 1997	3rd, 1996	Defunct
Shaanxi National Power	陕西国力	1996 to 1997	3rd, 1997	Group, 1996	Defunct
Xiamen F.C.	厦门FC	1996 to 1997	6th, 1996	Group 4th, 1997	Defunct
Shenzhen Kinspar	深圳金鹏	1996	2nd, 1996		Defunct
Wuhan Qianwei	武汉前卫	1995	4th, 1995		Defunct
Shanghai Pudong	上海浦东	1995	1st, 1995		Defunct
Shenzhen F.C.	深圳FC	1994	1st, 1994		Defunct
Sichuan Quanxing	四川全兴	1989 to 1990	2nd, 1990	7th, 1989	Defunct
Foshan	佛山	1989	1st, 1989		Defunct

== Winners ==
Season	Winners	Runners-up	Third-place	Fourth-place
1989	Foshan	Huochetou	Wuhan	Jilin
1990	Jilin	Sichuan	Shandong Economic and Trade Commission	Wuhan
1991	Shandong	Guangxi	Shandong Economic and Trade Commission	Shanghai B
1992	Shandong Economic and Trade Commission	Wuhan	Guangzhou B	Hunan
1993	not held			
1994	Shenzhen F.C.	Shanghai B	Dalian Tielu	Beijing Shougang
1995	Shanghai Pudong	Henan Construction	Dalian Shunfa	Wuhan Qianwei
1996	Tianjin Vanke	Shenzhen Kinspar	Chengdu F.C.	Shanghai Fubao
1997	Jiangsu Gige	Chengdu F.C.	Chongqing Hongyan	Shaanxi National Power
1998	Guangzhou Baiyunshan	Beijing Kuanli	Dalian Yiteng	Qingdao Hailifeng
1999	Henan Construction	Huizhou PLA Saonon	Qingdao Hailifeng	Hubei Duorenduo
2000	Mianyang F.C.	Tianjin Lifei	Guangzhou Baiyunshan	Shanghai 02
2001	Dalian Sidelong	Liaoning Liaoqing	Hangzhou Luyuan	Gansu Tianma
2002	Harbin Lange	Guangdong Xiongying	Dalian Sundy	Hebei Pascali
2003	Dalian Sundy	Xi'an Anxinyuan	Yanbian F.C.	Shanghai Tianna
2004	Shanghai The 9	Yanbian F.C.	Yunnan Lijiang Dongba	Beijing Hongdeng
2005	Nanchang Bayi Hengyuan	Beijing Hongdeng	Dongguan Nancheng	Anhui Jiufang
2006	Beijing BIT	Harbin Yiteng	Anhui Jiufang	Tianjin Huochetou
2007	Shanghai East Asia	Sichuan F.C.	Anhui Jiufang	Guangxi Tianji
2008	Shenyang Dongjin	Guangdong Sunray Cave	China Three Gorges University	Tianjin Huochetou
2009	Hunan Billows	Hubei Luyin	Beijing Baxy&Shengshi	Hangzhou Sanchao
2010	Dalian Aerbin	Tianjin Songjiang	Guizhou Zhicheng	Dalian Yiteng
2011	Harbin Songbei Yiteng	Chongqing F.C.	Fujian Smart Hero	Dongguan Nancheng
2012	Guizhou Zhicheng	Hubei China-Kyle	Shenzhen Fengpeng	Qinghai Senke
2013	Qingdao Hainiu	Hebei Zhongji	Shenzhen Fengpeng	Shandong Tengding
2014	Jiangxi Liansheng	Taiyuan Zhongyou Jiayi	Guizhou Zhicheng	Meizhou Kejia
2015	Meizhou Kejia	Dalian Transcendence	Sichuan Longfor	Nanjing Qianbao
2016	Lijiang Jiayunhao	Baoding Yingli ETS	Jiangxi Liansheng	Sichuan Longfor
2017	Heilongjiang Lava Spring	Meizhou Meixian Techand	Yinchuan Helanshan	Shenzhen Ledman
2018	Sichuan Longfor	Nantong Zhiyun	Shaanxi Chang'an Athletic	Jiangsu Yancheng Dingli
2019	Shenyang Urban	Chengdu Better City	Taizhou Yuanda	Suzhou Dongwu
2020	Wuhan Three Towns	Zibo Cuju	Nanjing Fengfan	Beijing BIT
2021	Qingdao Hainiu	Hebei Kungfu	Guangxi Pingguo Haliao	Qingdao Youth Island
2022	Jinan Xingzhou	Dandong Tengyue	Yanbian Longding	Dongguan United
2023	Chongqing Tongliang Long	Dalian Zhixing	Yunnan Yukun	Qingdao Red Lions
2024	Guangdong GZ-Power	Dalian K'un City	Shenzhen Juniors	Shaanxi Union

== Sponsors ==
Sponsorships
Season	Sponsor	Annual Value	Official League Name
2016	Winlink Sports	¥5 million	Winlink Chinese Football Association China League
2017	Winlink Sports	¥5 million	Winlink Chinese Football Association China League
2018	Winlink Sports	¥6 million	Winlink Chinese Football Association China League

== See also ==
- China League One
- Chinese FA Cup
- Chinese Football Association
- Chinese Super League
