= Qinghai Senke F.C. =

Chinese football club

Qinghai Senke Qīnghǎi Sēnkē 青海森科
- Full name: Qinghai Senke Football Club 青海森科足球俱乐部
- Founded: 2011 (amateur); 17 April 2012 (professional)
- Dissolved: November 2013
- Ground: Xining Ximen Stadium, Xining, Qinghai, China PR
- Capacity: 2,000
- Owner: Senke Group
Home colours	Away colours

Qinghai Senke Football Club (Chinese: 青海森科; pinyin: Qīnghǎi Sēnkē) was a football club based in Xining, Qinghai, China.

== History ==
Qinghai Senke was established as an amateur club in 2011 and finished the 7th place in the northern group final of 2011 China Amateur Football League. On 17 April 2012, the club was reorganized as a professional football club. Former China national team midfielder Song Lihui was appointed as the club's first manager. They registered to play within China League Two, third tier of the Chinese football league system in the 2012 league season.

== Results ==
All-time league rankings

Season	2011	2012	2013
Division	4	3	3
Position	7^{1}	4	3^{1}

- ^1 in North Group
