= 2017 Dalian Transcendence F.C. season =

Dalian Transcendence F.C.
- Chairman: Wei Yimin
- Manager: Rusmir Cviko; Li Guoxu
- Stadium: Jinzhou Stadium
- League One: 14th
- FA Cup: 2nd round
- Top goalscorer: Wang Hongyou (7 goals)
- Highest home attendance: 15,772
- Lowest home attendance: 533
- Average home league attendance: 2,888
Home colours	Away colours

The 2017 Dalian Transcendence F.C. season is the 4th season in club history.

== Background ==
After struggling in the relegation zone last season, many valuable players decided to leave. Goal keeper Guo Wei announced on his social media that the team defaulted his salary, and he gained a chance to end his contract through a CFA arbitration. They renewed their contract with their caretaker, Rusmir Cviko.

Jaílton Paraíba, the best scorer last season, had been absent since May. It was believed that he flew to the United States to take care of his wife, who recently gave birth to a child. However, Paraíba released a video clip later, accusing the team for providing poor accommodation, as well as defaulting his salary for more than 3 months, that he will seek to end the contract.

On 10 August, it's been reported that Rusmir resigned due to family concern, and the team decided to promote their reserve team manager, Li Guoxu.

Dalian Transcendence struggled throughout the 2017 season to prevent from relegation. The position was fixed until the last round, as Transcendence shared same points with Baoding Yingli ETS, but won a head-to-head match.

== Kits ==
Home
Away
Goalkeeper
Home
Goalkeeper
Away

== Preseason ==
=== Training matches ===
31 December 2016 Friendly	Dalian Transcendence	0 – 0	Zhejiang Yiteng	Kunming, Yunnan

11 January 2017 Friendly	Dalian Transcendence	2 – 3	Hebei Elite	Kunming, Yunnan
	Hu Zhaojun; Dong Zhiyuan

17 January 2017 Friendly	Dalian Transcendence	1 – 1	Daegu FC	Kunming, Yunnan
	Wang Hongyou

19 January 2017 Friendly	Dalian Transcendence	1 – 2	Baoding Yingli ETS	Kunming, Yunnan
	Tang Lizhen

21 January 2017 Friendly	Dalian Transcendence	1 – 1	Dalian Yifang	Kunming, Yunnan
	Fan Peipei

22 January 2017 Friendly	Dalian Transcendence	0 – 2	Shaanxi Chang'an Athletic	Kunming, Yunnan

7 February 2017 Friendly	Dalian Transcendence	5 – 0	NK Umag	Umag, Croatia

11 February 2017 Friendly	Dalian Transcendence	0 – 4	NK Istra 1961	Umag, Croatia

14 February 2017 Friendly	Dalian Transcendence	0 – 2	NK Celje	Umag, Croatia

15 February 2017 Friendly	Dalian Transcendence	1 – 0	NK Umag	Umag, Croatia

21 February 2017 Friendly	Dalian Transcendence	1 – 3	NK Triglav Kranj	Umag, Croatia

25 February 2017 Friendly	Dalian Transcendence	1 – 2	NK Bravo Interblock	Umag, Croatia

== China League One ==
=== League table ===
Pos	Team	Pld	W	D	L	GF	GA	GD	Pts	Promotion, qualification or relegation
12	Meizhou Hakka	30	8	9	13	33	39	−6	33	
13	Zhejiang Yiteng	30	8	8	14	35	46	−11	32	
14	Dalian Transcendence	30	8	7	15	34	58	−24	31	
15	Baoding Yingli ETS (R)	30	8	7	15	41	51	−10	31	Relegation to League Two
16	Yunnan Lijiang (R)	30	4	9	17	31	62	−31	21	Relegation to League Two

Updated to match(es) played on 28 October 2017. Source: League table
Rules for classification: 1) Points; 2) Head-to-head points; 3) Head-to-head goal difference; 4) Head-to-head goals scored; 5) Reserve league points; 6) Goal difference; 7) Goals scored; 8) Disciplinary points (1 point for each yellow card, 3 points for each red card); 9) Draw
(R) Relegated

=== Results summary ===
Overall								Home						Away					
Pld	W	D	L	GF	GA	GD	Pts	W	D	L	GF	GA	GD	W	D	L	GF	GA	GD
30	8	7	15	34	58	−24	31	4	6	5	18	26	−8	4	1	10	16	32	−16

=== Position by round ===
Round	1	2	3	4	5	6	7	8	9	10	11	12	13	14	15	16	17	18	19	20	21	22	23	24	25	26	27	28	29	30
Ground	A	A	A	H	H	A	H	A	H	A	A	A	H	A	H	H	H	A	H	A	H	A	H	A	H	H	H	A	H	A
Result	L	L	W	W	D	L	W	W	D	L	W	L	L	L	D	L	D	W	L	L	D	L	D	L	L	W	L	L	W	D
Position	16	16	12	7	9	10	9	6	6	10	5	9	10	10	11	11	11	10	9	11	9	11	11	11	13	12	12	13	13	14

Updated to match(es) played on 28 October 2017. Source: Competitive matches
A = Away; H = Home; W = Win; D = Draw; L = Loss

=== League fixtures and results ===
As of 24 February 2017. Some fixtures might be adjusted if necessary.

	Date	Time		H/A	Opponent	Res.F–A	Att.	Goalscorers and disciplined players		Location	Stadium	Report
	Date	Time		H/A	Opponent	Res.F–A	Att.	Dalian Transcendence	Opponent	Location	Stadium	Report
1	12 March	Sunday	16:00	A	Shenzhen F.C.	0-6	25,891	Xue Ya'nan (yellow card) 29'; Liu Yusheng (red card) 33'	Preciado 22', 62', 77'; Obasi 30', 48'; Aboubakar 53'	Shenzhen	Shenzhen Stadium	
2	16 March	Thursday	15:30	A	Beijing Renhe	2-3	2,837	Wang Hongyou (yellow card) 8'; Ivan Božić (yellow card) 32'; Quan Heng (yellow card) 35'; Jaílton Paraíba 57'; Zheng Jianfeng (yellow card) 82'; Dong Zhiyuan 89'; Hu Zhaojun (yellow card) 90'	Jaime Ayoví 17'; Wan Houliang 29'; Chen Jie 84'	Beijing	Beijing Fengtai Stadium	
3	1 April	Saturday	15:00	A	Nei Mongol Zhongyou	1-0	8,051	Hu Zhaojun 43'; Zhang Jian (yellow card) 53'; David Fallman (yellow card) 72'; Ötkür Hesen (yellow card) 74'		Hohhot	Hohhot City Stadium	
4	8 April	Saturday	14:30	H	Hangzhou Greentown	1-0	2,853	Ivan Božić (yellow card) 15' (goal) 57'	Anselmo Ramon (yellow card) 90'	Dalian	Jinzhou Stadium	
5	15 April	Saturday	14:30	H	Shanghai Shenxin	0-0	2,816	Zheng Jianfeng (yellow card) 38'; Zhao Yibo (yellow card) 51'; Dong Zhiyuan (yellow card) 53'		Dalian	Jinzhou Stadium	
6	23 April	Sunday	16:30	A	Xinjiang Tianshan Leopard	0-1	2,654	Wang Hongyou (yellow card) 73'	Abduhamit Abdugheni 34'	Ürümqi	Xinjiang Sports Centre	
7	29 April	Saturday	14:30	H	Yunnan Lijiang	2-1	1,902	Fan Peipei (yellow card) 36'; Xue Ya'nan 47'; Sheng Jun (yellow card) 86', (goal) 90+2'	Zhou Shengyuan (yellow card) 43'; Kaio 50'; Johnny (yellow card) 88'; Ha Zhaotong (yellow card) 90+4'	Dalian	Jinzhou Stadium	
8	6 May	Saturday	16:00	A	Baoding Yingli ETS	2-1	4,905	Wang Hongyou 34', 44'	Sun Jiangshan 35'	Baoding	Langfang Stadium	
9	13 May	Saturday	14:30	H	Meizhou Hakka	1-1	2,633	Wang Hongyou 2'; Zhao Yibo (yellow card) 27'; Fan Peipei (yellow card) 43'; Hu Zhaojun (yellow card) 63'	Yang Wenji (yellow card) 62'; Valeri Bojinov 83'	Dalian	Jinzhou Stadium	
10	20 May	Saturday	19:35	A	Beijing BG	1-3	5,150	Ivan Božić 15'; Zhao Yibo (yellow card) 26'	Bu Xin (yellow card) 60'; Wang Jianwen 62'; Rubin Okotie 68'; Bu Xin 78'	Beijing	Olympic Sports Centre (Beijing)	
11	27 May	Saturday	19:00	A	Zhejiang Yiteng	3-1	3,500	Jaílton Paraíba 26', 41'; Xue Ya'nan 44'; Cui Kai (yellow card) 51'; Ivan Božić (yellow card) 55'	Ren Xin (yellow card) 74'; He Yang 82'	Shaoxing	Shaoxing China Textile City Sports Center	
12	3 June	Saturday	19:30	A	Qingdao Huanghai	1-3	5,966	Wang Hongyou (yellow card) 26'; Zhang Jian 57'; Liu Yuchen (yellow card) 67'; Xue Ya'nan (yellow card) 70'	Joan Verdú 27', 72'; Godfred Karikari 37'; Yang Yun (yellow card) 54'	Qingdao	Guoxin Gymnasium	
13	10 June	Saturday	15:30	H	Dalian Yifang	2-4	15,772	Hu Zhaojun 28'; Ivan Božić 31' (yellow card) 31'; Liu Yuchen (yellow card) 42'; Zhao Yibo (yellow card) 45'	Sun Guowen 14'; Jonathan Ferrari 24'; Yannick Boli 54'; Zhao Xuebin 87'	Dalian	Jinzhou Stadium	
14	18 June	Sunday	19:30	A	Wuhan Zall	1-3	21,513	Dong Zhiyuan 50'	Marcelo Moreno 7' (pen.), 51'; Jean Evrard Kouassi 90+4'	Wuhan	Wuhan Sports Center	
15	24 June	Saturday	19:30	H	Shijiazhuang Ever Bright	Postponed.				Dalian	Jinzhou Stadium	
16	1 July	Saturday	19:30	H	Shenzhen F.C.	3-3	3,213	Wang Hongyou 4'; Zhao Yibo (yellow card) 9'; Ivan Božić 50'; Eldar Hasanović 90+2'	Fei Yu 31'; Aboubakar 55'; Guan Zhen (yellow card) 59'; Xu Liang 68'	Dalian	Jinzhou Stadium	
17	8 July	Saturday	19:30	H	Beijing Renhe	0-4	2,325	Ötkür Hesen (yellow card) 84'; Sheng Jun (yellow card) 87'	Cao Yongjing 12' (yellow card) 57'; Jaime Ayoví 22', 45+1'; Ayub Masika 37'; Ivo (yellow card) 87'	Dalian	Jinzhou Stadium	
18	15 July	Saturday	19:30	H	Nei Mongol Zhongyou	1-1	2,236	Wang Hongyou (yellow card) 81'; Dong Zhiyuan 82'	André Senghor 43'; Zhu Zilin (yellow card) 90+2'	Dalian	Jinzhou Stadium	
19	23 July	Sunday	19:35	A	Hangzhou Greentown	1-0	2,887	Liu Yuchen (yellow card) 39'; Eldar Hasanović 48'; Hu Zhaojun (yellow card) 65'	Ge Zhen (yellow card) 41'; Dong Yu (yellow card) 60'	Hangzhou	Huanglong Stadium	
15	30 July	Sunday	19:30	H	Shijiazhuang Ever Bright	1-3	2,377	Ivan Božić (yellow card) 59'; Hu Zhaojun 72'	Adriano 30' (pen.), 68'; Martheus 53'; Lü Jianjun (yellow card) 75'	Dalian	Jinzhou Stadium	
20	5 August	Saturday	19:45	A	Shanghai Shenxin	0-3	6,169	Zhao Yibo (yellow card) 47'; Liu Yuchen (yellow card) 49'; Eldar Hasanović (yellow card) 58'	Gu Bin 19'; Xu Xiaolong (yellow card) 33'; Biro Biro 36'; Zhang Yudong (yellow card) 49'; Wang Yun 69'	Shanghai	Jinshan Sports Centre	
21	12 August	Saturday	19:30	H	Xinjiang Tianshan Leopard	1-1	2,018	Eldar Hasanović 28'; Zhang Jian (yellow card) 45'	Wu Peng (yellow card) 27'; Sabit Abdusalam 43'; Abduhamit Abdugheni (yellow card) 90'	Dalian	Jinzhou Stadium	
22	19 August	Saturday	16:00	A	Yunnan Lijiang	1-2	3,682	Ivan Bozic 67'	Chen Fangzhou 17'; Natalio 84'	Lijiang	Lijiang Stadium	
23	26 August	Saturday	19:30	H	Baoding Yingli ETS	1-1	1,892	Wang Hongyou 57' (pen.)	Yang Hao 18' (yellow card) 76'; Miao Ming (yellow card) 23'; Du Junpeng (yellow card) 52' (red card) 69'; Che Kerui (yellow card) 54'; Zhao Xudong (yellow card) 55'; Sun Fabo (yellow card) 75'	Dalian	Jinzhou Stadium	
24	2 September	Saturday	15:30	A	Meizhou Hakka	1-3	7,835	Dong Zhiyuan (yellow card) 17'; Zheng Jianfeng 42'; Fan Peipei (yellow card) 50'	Li Zhilang (yellow card) 33'; Serges Déblé 61'; Japa 67', 90'	Meizhou	Wuhua County Stadium	
25	10 September	Sunday	19:30	H	Beijing BG	2-4	861	David Fallman (yellow card) 19'; Wang Hongyou 40' (pen.); Zheng Jianfeng (yellow card) 42'; Eldar Hasanović 56'	Zhang Junzhe (yellow card) 32'; Yan Xiangchuang 37'; Anichebe 49' (yellow card) 52'; Jin Hui 67'; Bu Xin (yellow card) 90+4'; Chen Hao-wei 95'	Dalian	Jinzhou Stadium	
26	16 September	Saturday	19:30	H	Zhejiang Yiteng	1-0	871	Wang Hongyou 48' (pen.); Zheng Jianfeng (yellow card) 84'		Dalian	Jinzhou Stadium	
27	23 September	Saturday	14:30	H	Qingdao Huanghai	0-3	1,011	Quan Heng (yellow card) 58'; David Fallman (yellow card) 83'; Hu Zhaojun (yellow card) 85'	Đorđe Rakić 18', 37'; Fan Lingjiang (yellow card) 27'; Deng Zhuoxiang 39'; Godfred Karikari (yellow card) 83'; Liu Peng (yellow card) 90+1'	Dalian	Jinzhou Stadium	
28	15 October	Sunday	15:30	A	Dalian Yifang	1-2	24,981	Wang Hongyou (penalty missed) 20'; Fan Peipei 32'; Liu Yusheng (yellow card) 47'; Sheng Jun (yellow card) 89'; Zhao Yibo (yellow card) 90+4'	Yannick Boli 14'; Jin Qiang (yellow card) 23'; Jonathan Ferrari (yellow card) 24'; Zhu Xiaogang (yellow card) 45'; Zhao Xuebin 81'; Li Shuai (yellow card) 89'	Dalian	Dalian Sports Center	
29	21 October	Saturday	14:30	H	Wuhan Zall	2-0	533	Hu Zhaojun 45'; Quan Heng 66'	Song Zhiwei (yellow card) 90'	Dalian	Jinzhou Stadium	
30	28 October	Saturday	14:30	A	Shijiazhuang Ever Bright	1-1	12,613	Zheng Jianfeng 52'	Liu Xinyu 59'	Shijiazhuang	Yutong Sports Center	

== Chinese FA Cup ==
=== FA Cup fixtures and results ===
20 April 2017 2	Meixian Techand	4 – 1	Dalian Transcendence	Meizhou, Guangdong
19:30	Yang Junjie 29', 36', 64'; Zhang Yong 56'		Wang Guanghao 33'	Stadium: Meixian Tsang Hin-chi Stadium

== Player information ==
=== Transfers ===
==== In ====
No.	Pos.	Name	Age	Moving from	Type	Transfer Window	Transfer fee	Notes	Ref.
9	FW	(Bosnia and Herzegovina) Ivan Božić	33	(Croatia) NK Sesvete	Transfer	Winter	—	—	
15	MF	(China) Otkur Hasan	23	Hebei China Fortune Reserves	Transfer	Winter	—	—	
18	MF	(China) Fan Peipei	32	(China) Chongqing Lifan	Transfer	Winter	—	—	
12	DF	(China) Wang Xiaoxing	20	(China) Yinchuan Helanshan	Transfer	Winter	—	—	
20	FW	(China) Dong Zhiyuan	27	(China) Hebei Elite	Transfer	Winter	—	—	
19	DF	(China) Zheng Jianfeng	27	(Portugal) 1º Dezembro	Transfer	Winter	—	—	
30	DF	(China) Liu Yusheng	26	(China) Hunan Billows	Transfer	Winter	—	—	
22	GK	(China) Wang Yi	26	(China) Wuhan Zall	Transfer	Winter	—	—	
4	MF	(Bosnia and Herzegovina) Eldar Hasanović	26	(Israel) Maccabi Sha'arayim F.C.	Transfer	Summer	—	—	
6	MF	(China) Yang Fangzhi	26	(China) Dalian Yifang	Loan	Summer	—	—	
61	DF	(China) He Huan		—	Transfer	Summer	—	—	

==== Out ====
No.	Pos.	Name	Age	Moving to	Type	Transfer Window	Transfer fee	Notes	Ref.
6	MF	(China) Han Xu	28	(China) Dalian Yifang	Transfer	Winter	€1.35M	—	
4	MF	(China) Zhang Gong	24	(China) Guangzhou R&F	Transfer	Winter	—	—	
11	MF	(China) Su Di	26	(China) Wuhan Zall	Transfer	Winter	—	—	
10	FW	(Brazil) William Paulista	31	(Brazil) Macaé	Transfer	Winter	—	—	
21	MF	(China) Liu Yingchen	24	(China) Dalian Yifang	Transfer	Winter	—	—	
32	MF	(China) Nan Yunqi	23	(China) Dalian Boyang	Transfer	Winter	—	—	
15	MF	(China) Liu Huan	27	(China) Chongqing Lifan	Transfer	Winter	—	—	
23	GK	(China) Guo Wei	27	(China) Shanghai Shenxin	Released	Winter	—	Team violated contract	
36	DF	(China) Liu Tao	32	(China) Shenzhen Ledman	Transfer	Winter	—	—	
33	FW	(China) Du Wenxiang	25	(China) Sichuan Longfor	Transfer	Winter	—	—	
9	FW	(Kosovo) Erton Fejzullahu	29	(Sweden) Sarpsborg 08	Released	Winter	—	—	
7	FW	(Brazil) Jaílton Paraíba	26	(Turkey) Gençlerbirliği S.K.	Released	Summer	—	Team violated contract	

=== Squad ===
As of 3 March 2017

Note: Flags indicate national team as defined under FIFA eligibility rules; some limited exceptions apply. Players may hold more than one non-FIFA nationality.

No.	Pos.	Nation	Player
1	GK	CHN	Cui Kai
2	DF	CHN	Wang Guanghao
3	DF	CHN	Zhao Yibo
4	MF	BIH	Eldar Hasanović
5	MF	CHN	Xue Ya'nan
6	FW	CHN	Yang Fangzhi (on loan from Dalian Yifang)
8	MF	CHN	Jing Deyang
9	FW	BIH	Ivan Božić
11	DF	CHN	Cui Yu
12	FW	CHN	Wang Xiaoxing
14	MF	CHN	Hu Zhaojun
15	MF	CHN	Otkur Hasan
16	DF	SWE	David Fällman
18	FW	CHN	Fan Peipei
19	DF	CHN	Zheng Jianfeng

No.	Pos.	Nation	Player
20	FW	CHN	Dong Zhiyuan
21	DF	CHN	Liu Yuchen
22	GK	CHN	Wang Yi
24	MF	CHN	Guo Chen
25	MF	CHN	Quan Heng
26	GK	CHN	Chen Yongxin
27	DF	CHN	Tang Lizhen
28	MF	CHN	Zhang Jian
29	MF	CHN	Sheng Jun
30	DF	CHN	Liu Yusheng
31	DF	CHN	Hong Youpeng
33	MF	CHN	Wang Hongyou
37	DF	CHN	Xie Zhaoyu
45	DF	CHN	Zhang Xiaolong
46	DF	CHN	Qu Jiachen

=== Reserve squad ===
Note: Flags indicate national team as defined under FIFA eligibility rules; some limited exceptions apply. Players may hold more than one non-FIFA nationality.

No.	Pos.	Nation	Player
41	DF	CHN	Yao Diran
42	DF	CHN	Cui Binhui
43	DF	CHN	Hao Xingchen

No.	Pos.	Nation	Player
47	DF	CHN	Tian Ziyi
48	MF	CHN	Yu Ziran
49	MF	CHN	Li Ning

== Coaching staff ==
As of season 2017

Position	Name
Head coach	(Bosnia and Herzegovina) Rusmir Cviko (China) Li Guoxu (caretaker, from August)
Assistant coaches	(China) Qu Gang (Bosnia and Herzegovina) Dželaludin Muharemović (China) Zou Peng
Goalkeeping coach	(China) Chen Dong
Fitness coach	(Bosnia and Herzegovina) Almir Seferovic
Team doctor	(China) Liu Pangui

=== League performance data ===
As of 28 October.

No.	Pos.	Name	Nat.	Age	China League One					Note
No.	Pos.	Name	Nat.	Age	App.	Goals	Booked	(yellow card) (red card)	Sent off (straight red)	Note
1	GK	Cui Kai	(China)	30	27	0	1	0	0	
22	GK	Wang Yi	(China)	27	2	0	0	0	0	
26	GK	Chen Yongxin	(China)	24	1	0	0	0	0	
16	CB	David Fällman	(Sweden)	27	25	0	4	0	0	
19	RB	Zheng Jianfeng	(China)	28	26	2	5	0	0	
18	LB	Fan Peipei	(China)	32	20	1	4	0	0	
33	CB	Wang Hongyou	(China)	32	28	7	5	0	0	
2	DF	Wang Guanghao	(China)	24	-	-	-	-	-	Not used
30	CB	Liu Yusheng	(China)	27	6	0	2	0	1	
21	DF	Liu Yuchen	(China)	28	12	0	4	0	0	
24	DF	Guo Chen	(China)	21	-	-	-	-	-	Not used
27	DF	Tang Lizhen	(China)	26	-	-	-	-	-	Not used
45	DF	Zhang Xiaolong	(China)	24	-	-	-	-	-	Not used
46	DF	Qu Jiachen	(China)	24	4	0	0	0	0	
15	DM	Ötkür Hesen	(China)	24	13	0	2	0	0	
11	MF	Cui Yu	(China)	28	3	0	0	0	0	
4	AM	Eldar Hasanović	(Bosnia and Herzegovina)	27	15	4	1	0	0	
3	DM	Zhao Yibo	(China)	29	28	0	7	0	0	
5	DM	Xue Ya'nan	(China)	27	22	2	2	0	0	
14	AM	Hu Zhaojun	(China)	36	25	4	5	0	0	
29	AM	Sheng Jun	(China)	27	19	1	4	0	0	
8	RM	Jing Deyang	(China)	27	1	0	0	0	0	
25	LW	Quan Heng	(China)	28	13	1	2	0	0	
37	MF	Xie Zhaoyu	(China)	20	2	0	0	0	0	
-	LW	Jaílton Paraíba	(Brazil)	27	9	3	1	0	0	
9	CF	Ivan Božić	(Bosnia and Herzegovina)	33	29	5	5	0	0	
28	RW	Zhang Jian	(China)	28	28	1	3	0	0	
20	CF	Dong Zhiyuan	(China)	28	26	3	2	0	0	
6	RW	Yang Fangzhi	(China)	20	7	0	0	0	0	
12	LW	Wang Xiaoxing	(China)	21	7	0	0	0	0	
31	LW	Hong Youpeng	(China)	22	18	0	0	0	0	
Total						34	59	0	1	
