= 2018 Dalian Transcendence F.C. season =

Dalian Transcendence F.C.
- Chairman: (China) Zhao Yang
- Manager: (China) Li Guoxu (to 11 April) (Bosnia and Herzegovina) Dželaludin Muharemović (from 11 April)
- Stadium: Jinzhou Stadium
- League One: 15th, relegated
- FA Cup: 4th round
- Top goalscorer: (Brazil) Rafael Silva (9 Goals)
- Highest home attendance: 1,679
- Lowest home attendance: 819
- Average home league attendance: 1,209
Home colours	Away colours

The 2018 Dalian Transcendence F.C. season is the 5th and the last season in its existence. The club dissolved after this season.

== Overview ==
After sided with the team last season as the caretaker, Li Guoxu will become the head coach. The team expected their position to be 8th-10th.

After 5 defeats in a row at the start of the season, Dalian Transcendence decided to replace Li Guoxu with Dželaludin Muharemović, who worked with Rusmir Cviko as assistant coach in the previous season.

The team sold naming right to local automobile dealer Dalian Huifeng on 16 July, to compete as Dalian Huifeng Automobile Plaza F.C. hence.

Transcendence merely prevented relegation in the previous two seasons. However, the team found themselves at a confirmed 15th position after the 28 October defeat, and would regretfully descend into 2019 China League Two.

On 13 January 2019, Transcendence failed to sign up the salary confirmation file of the 2018 season, and thus lost the license into the 2019 China League One. The owner decided one day later to disband the team regretfully.

== Kits ==
Dalian Transcendence 2018 kits were featured with patterns of ocean tides and waves, sponsored by Joma.

Home
Away
Goalkeeper
Home
Goalkeeper
Away

== Preseason ==
=== Training matches ===
30 December 2017 Friendly	Dalian Transcendence	2 – 1	Lhasa Urban Construction Investment	Kunming, Yunnan
15:30	He Huan; Quan Heng			Stadium: Haigeng Training Base

7 January 2018 Friendly	Dalian Transcendence	0 – 0	Shanghai Shenxin	Kunming, Yunnan
				Stadium: Haigeng Training Base

10 January 2017 Friendly	Dalian Transcendence	1 – 1	Hebei Elite	Kunming, Yunnan
	Xie Zhaoyu (pen.)			Stadium: Haigeng Training Base

11 January 2017 Friendly	Dalian Transcendence	2 – 2	China U-20	Kunming, Yunnan
10:00	Wang Hongyou; Quan Heng			Stadium: Haigeng Training Base

13 January 2018 Friendly	Dalian Transcendence	2 – 2	Shenzhen F.C.	Kunming, Yunnan
	Hu Zhaojun; Dong Zhiyuan			Stadium: Haigeng Training Base

20 January 2018 Friendly	Dalian Transcendence	0 – 1	Suzhou Dongwu	Kunming, Yunnan
15:30				Stadium: Haigeng Training Base

21 January 2018 Friendly	Dalian Transcendence	0 – 1	Zhejiang Greentown	Kunming, Yunnan
15:30				Stadium: Haigeng Training Base

25 January 2018 Friendly	Dalian Transcendence	3 – 3	Dalian Yifang U19	Kunming, Yunnan
15:30	Chuck Yiu Kwok			Stadium: Haigeng Training Base

27 January 2018 Friendly	Dalian Transcendence	0 – 5	Daegu FC	Kunming, Yunnan
				Stadium: Haigeng Training Base

1 February 2018 Friendly	Dalian Transcendence	0 – 4	Daegu FC	Kunming, Yunnan
				Stadium: Haigeng Training Base

10 February 2018 Friendly	Dalian Transcendence	2 – 1	Sichuan Longfor	Kunming, Yunnan
15:00	Hu Zhaojun; Wang Hongyou (pen.)			Stadium: Haigeng Training Base

22 February 2018 Friendly	Dalian Transcendence	1 – 5	Seoul E-Land FC	Cheongju, South Korea
	Zhang Jian

27 February 2018 Friendly	Dalian Transcendence	0 – 4	Busan IPark	Cheongju, South Korea

== China League One ==
=== League table ===
Pos	Team	Pld	W	D	L	GF	GA	GD	Pts	Promotion, qualification or relegation
12	Zhejiang Yiteng (D, R)	30	10	7	13	43	53	−10	37 (Note: Shanghai Shenxin is ahead of Zhejiang Yiteng on head-to-head points: Shanghai Shenxin 1–0 Zhejiang Yiteng, Zhejiang Yiteng 0–1 Shanghai Shenxin.)	Relegation to League Two
13	Nei Mongol Zhongyou (Note: Ineligible for promotion.)	30	10	4	16	36	54	−18	34 (Note: Nei Mongol Zhongyou is ahead of Meizhou Meixian Techand on head-to-head points: Nei Mongol Zhongyou 1–0 Meizhou Meixian Techand, Meizhou Meixian Techand 1–3 Nei Mongol Zhongyou.)	
14	Meizhou Meixian Techand (O)	30	8	10	12	41	44	−3	34	Qualification to Relegation play-offs
15	Dalian Transcendence (Note: Dalian Transcendence was ineligible for promotion. And Dalian was dissolved after failing to submit the salary & bonus confirmation form.) (R, D)	30	7	7	16	28	48	−20	28	Disbanded after season
16	Xinjiang Tianshan Leopard	30	3	9	18	24	61	−37	18	

Source: League table
Rules for classification: 1) Points; 2) Head-to-head points; 3) Head-to-head goal difference; 4) Head-to-head goals scored; 5) Reserve league points; 6) Goal difference; 7) Goals scored; 8) Disciplinary points (1 point for each yellow card, 3 points for each red card); 9) Draw
(D) Disqualified; (O) Play-off winners; (R) Relegated

=== Results summary ===
Overall								Home						Away					
Pld	W	D	L	GF	GA	GD	Pts	W	D	L	GF	GA	GD	W	D	L	GF	GA	GD
31	7	7	17	46	29	+17	28	5	5	5	16	18	−2	2	2	12	30	11	+19

Last updated: 28 October 2018.
Source: See Results

=== Position by round ===
Round	1	2	3	4	5	6	7	8	9	10	11	12	13	14	15	16	17	18	19	20	21	22	23	24	25	26	27	28	29	30
Ground	A	A	A	H	A	A	A	A	H	H	H	A	A	A	H	H	H	H	A	H	H	H	H	A	H	A	H	A	H	A
Result	L	L	L	L	L	L	W	D	W	W	D	L	L	W	D	D	L	L	L	D	W	D	W	L	W	D	L	L	L	L
Position	13	16	16	16	16	16	15	15	14	14	14	14	14	14	14	14	14	15	15	15	15	15	15	15	15	15	15	15	15	15

Updated to match(es) played on 28 October 2018. Source: Competitive matches
A = Away; H = Home; W = Win; D = Draw; L = Loss

=== League fixtures and results ===
	Date		Time _{UTC+8}	H/A	Opponent	Res.F–A	Att.	Goalscorers and disciplined players		Location	Stadium	Report
	Date		Time _{UTC+8}	H/A	Opponent	Res.F–A	Att.	Dalian Transcendence	Opponent	Location	Stadium	Report
1	11 Mar	Sun	15:30	A	Qingdao Huanghai	2–4	10,320	Yin Lu 28'; Wang Hongyou 33' (yellow card) 42'	Joan Verdú 32', 82'; Yaki Yen 40'; Yao Jiangshan (yellow card) 59'; Francisco Sandaza 88'	Qingdao	Guoxin Gymnasium	Report
2	17 Mar	Sat	19:35	A	Zhejiang Greentown	0–4	6,819	Liu Tianqi (yellow card) 74'	Zou Dehai (yellow card) 19'; Dong Yu (yellow card) 42'; Wang Yang 54'; Dino Ndlovu 65', 70'; Li Xingcan 85'	Hangzhou	Huanglong Stadium	Report
3	31 Mar	Sat	19:30	A	Shijiazhuang Ever Bright	0–1	13,682	Meng Yang (yellow card) 18'; Yang Zexiang (yellow card) 20'; Yin Lu (yellow card) 32'; Rafael Silva (yellow card) 38'; Fan Peipei (yellow card) 56'; Xie Zhaoyu (yellow card) 90+1'	Matheus Nascimento (yellow card) 45+1'; Alen Melunović 78'; Zhan Minwei (yellow card) 80'; Wang Zihao (yellow card) 82'; Wang Peng (red card) 85'	Shijiazhuang	Yutong Sports Center	Report
4	4 Apr	Wed	14:30	H	Yanbian Funde	0–1	1,036	—	Li Haojie (yellow card) 10'; Richard Guzmics 15'	Dalian	Jinzhou Stadium	Report
5	7 Apr	Sat	19:30	A	Meixian Techand	1–3	5,862	Rafael Silva 41' (pen.); Zhao Yibo (yellow card) 50'; Zhang Jian (yellow card) 68'	Aloísio 15', 23', 81' (pen.); Yang Chen (yellow card) 76'	Meixian	Meixian Tsang Hin-chi Stadium	Report
6	15 Apr	Sun	19:30	A	Meizhou Hakka	1–2	2,880	Liu Tianqi (yellow card) 40'; Rafael Silva 81'; Li Geng (yellow card) 90+1'	Serges Déblé 58'; John Mary (yellow card) 73' (goal) 88'; Yang Wenji (yellow card) 90'	Meizhou	Wuhua County Stadium	Report
7	21 Apr	Sat	19:35	A	Nei Mongol Zhongyou	2–1	7,861	Yin Lu 56'; Rafael Silva 85'; Chen Yongxin (yellow card) 90+3'	Gao Zengxiang (yellow card) 45+1'; Duan Jieyi 73' (yellow card) 73'; Li Gen (yellow card) 84'	Hohhot	Hohhot City Stadium	Report
8	29 Apr	Sun	16:00	A	Xinjiang Tianshan Leopard	2–2	1,765	Yin Lu (yellow card) 32'; Eldar Hasanovic 41', 52'; Chen Yongxin (yellow card) 90+3'	Xu Qing 42'; Sabit Abdusalam 48'	Kuytun	Kuytun Sports Center	Report
9	6 May	Sun	15:30	H	Shanghai Shenxin	1–0	1,062	Wang Hongyou (yellow card) 61'; Hu Zhaojun 66'; Zhao Yibo (yellow card) 76'; Liu Yuchen (yellow card) 80'	Tian Junjie (yellow card) 20'; Zhang Wentao (yellow card) 38'; Wu Yizhen (yellow card) 77'; Johnny (yellow card) 81'	Dalian	Jinzhou Stadium	Report
10	12 May	Sat	15:30	H	Heilongjiang FC	1–0	1,320	Wang Hongyou (yellow card) 45+1'; Rafael Silva (yellow card) 72'; Eldar Hasanovic (yellow card) 90+3'; Sheng Jun 81'	Babacar Gueye (yellow card) 90+3'	Dalian	Jinzhou Stadium	Report
11	16 May	Wed	19:30	A	Liaoning FC	Postponed						
12	20 May	Sun	15:30	H	Shenzhen FC	1–1	1,305	Yang Zexiang (yellow card) 26'; Hu Zhaojun 50'; Xie Zhaoyu (yellow card) 75'; Chen Yongxin (yellow card) 87'	Fei Yu (yellow card) 14'; Xu Yang (yellow card) 21'; Franck Ohandza 48'	Dalian	Jinzhou Stadium	Report
13	27 May	Sun	19:30	A	Zhejiang Yiteng	1–3	4,057	Yang Zexiang 10'; Sheng Jun (yellow card) 77'	Yu Tao (yellow card) 20'; Wang Hongyou 23' (o.g.); Guto 57'; Wang Kai 72'	Shaoxing	Shaoxing China Textile City Sports Center	Report
11	11 Jul	Wed	19:30	A	Liaoning FC	0–1	2,579	Zhao Yibo (yellow card) 50'; Rafael Silva (yellow card) 90+4'	Jacob Mulenga 23'; Liu Xiaodong (yellow card) 54'; Sang Yifei (yellow card) 61'; Assani Lukimya (yellow card) 69'; Zhang Yanjun (yellow card) 84'; Song Chen (yellow card) 90+5'	Shenyang	Tiexi Stadium	Report
14	19 Jul	Thu	19:30	A	Beijing Enterprises	2–1	2,547	Xie Zhaoyu 34'; Zhao Yibo (yellow card) 53'; Rafael Silva 59'; Yin Lu (yellow card) 67'	Dominic Vinicius 5'	Beijing	Olympic Sports Centre (Beijing)	Report
15	22 Jul	Sun	19:00	H	Wuhan Zall	2–2	1,239	Rafael Silva 18', 21'; Wang Hongyou (yellow card) 56'; Fan Peipei (yellow card) 88'; Chen Yongxin (yellow card) 90+1'	Evrard 32'; Luo Yi (yellow card) 79' (goal) 86'	Dalian	Jinzhou Stadium	Report
16	29 Jul	Sun	19:00	H	Qingdao Huanghai	2–2	1,056	Liu Yuchen (yellow card) 17'; Rafael Silva (yellow card) 28' (goal) 48'; Eldar Hasanovic 90+4'	Shi Zhe (yellow card) 18' (goal) 44'; Gao Xiang 85'	Dalian	Jinzhou Stadium	Report
17	4 Aug	Sat	19:00	H	Zhejiang Greentown	1–3	1,256	Liu Yuchen 22' (yellow card) 90'; Dong Zhiyuan (yellow card) 45'; Wang Wanpeng (yellow card) 63'; Wang Hongyou (yellow card) 72'	Rafael Martins 49', 64'; Chen Po-liang 61'; Dong Yu (yellow card) 90'	Dalian	Jinzhou Stadium	Report
18	11 Aug	Sat	19:00	H	Shijiazhuang Ever Bright	0–2	1,123	Yin Lu (yellow card) 21'; Wang Wanpeng (yellow card) 3' (yellow-red card) 74'	Wang Peng (yellow card) 6'; Matheus 14'	Dalian	Jinzhou Stadium	Report
19	15 Aug	Wed	19:30	A	Yanbian Funde	0–1	11,920	Admir Adrović (yellow card) 42'; Qu Jiachen (yellow card) 56'	Wang Peng (yellow card) 30'; Oscar Maritu 79'; Pe Yuwen (yellow card) 90'; Richárd Guzmics (yellow card) 90+3'	Yanji	Yanji Nationwide Fitness Centre Stadium	Report
20	19 Aug	Sun	19:00	H	Meixian Techand	2–2	819	Liu Yuchen (yellow card) 16'; Wang Hongyou (red card) 23'; Yin Lu 37', 39'; Zhang Jian (yellow card) 78'; Admir Adrovic (yellow card) 90'	Yang Chen 27'; Aloisio 42'; Sheng Feng (yellow card) 85'	Dalian	Jinzhou Stadium	Report
21	26 Aug	Sun	19:00	H	Meizhou Hakka	2–1	1,379	Sheng Jun 55'; Quan Heng 61'; Hong Youpeng (yellow card) 63'; Wang Wanpeng (yellow card) 78'	Li Zhilang (yellow card) 34'; Huo Liang (yellow card) 40'; John Mary 47'; Chen Kerui (yellow card) 72'; Zhang Hongjiang (yellow card) 77'	Dalian	Jinzhou Stadium	Report
22	2 Sep	Sun	19:00	H	Hohhot	0–0	1,092	Eldar Hasanovic (yellow card) 87'	Dori (yellow card) 45+1'; Gao Zengxiang (yellow card) 78'	Dalian	Jinzhou Stadium	Report
23	15 Sep	Sat	19:00	H	Xinjiang Tianshan Leopard	2–1	1,318	Rafael Silva 8'; Wang Hongyou 69'; Chen Yongxin (yellow card) 74'	Paul Ngue (yellow card) 44'; Abdusalam Sabit 75'	Dalian	Jinzhou Stadium	Report
24	20 Sep	Thu	19:30	A	Shanghai Shenxin	0–1	902	Rafael Silva (yellow card) 80'	Xu Junmin (yellow card) 63'; Johnny (yellow card) 81'; Wu Yizhen 90'	Shanghai	Jinshan Sports Centre	Report
25	23 Sep	Sun	19:00	H	Zhejiang Yiteng	2–0	869	Rafael Silva 40'; Hong Youpeng (yellow card) 66'; Quan Heng (yellow card) 83'; Li Geng 90+5' (yellow card) 90+5'	Guto (yellow card) 38'; Hao Qiang (yellow card) 56'; Zhang Song (yellow card) 58'; Ren Peng (red card) 62'; Hu Zhaojun (yellow card) 84'	Dalian	Jinzhou Stadium	Report
26	29 Sep	Sat	15:30	A	Heilongjiang Lava Spring	0–0	8,679	Liu Yuchen (yellow card) 19'; Yin Lu (yellow card) 20'; Zhao Yibo (yellow card) 41'; Qu Jiachen (yellow card) 86' (yellow-red card) 90+4'; Yang Zexiang (yellow card) 90+1'; Rafael Silva (yellow card) 90+4'	Li Shuai (yellow card) 34'	Harbin	Harbin ICE Center Stadium	Report
27	7 Oct	Sun	15:30	H	Liaoning FC	0–1	1,585	Rafael Silva (yellow card) 68'	Song Chen (yellow card) 32'; Russell 44'; Jacob Mulenga (yellow card) 73'; Zhang Zhenqiang (yellow card) 90+2'	Dalian	Jinzhou Stadium	Report
28	21 Oct	Sun	15:30	A	Shenzhen FC	1–3	7,519	Zhao Yibo (yellow card) 16' (yellow-red card) 90+2'; Dong Zhiyuan 54'; Yang Zexiang (yellow card) 75'; Hasanovic (yellow card) 87'	Franck Ohandza 19', 45+1'; Harold Preciado 30'; Gan Chao 39'	Shenzhen	Shenzhen Stadium	Report
29	28 Oct	Sat	14:30	H	Beijing Enterprises	0–2	1,679		Gerard Gohou 30'; Wang Jianwen 43'	Dalian	Jinzhou Stadium	Report
30	3 Nov	Sat	14:30	A	Wuhan Zall	0–3	3,527	Wang Hongyou (yellow card) 7'; (yellow card) 45'; Sheng Jun (yellow card) 50'	Jean Evrard Kouassi 33'; Tao Xiaoxing 55'; Pedro Júnior 59'	Wuhan	Zhongnan Univ. of Economics and Law	Report

== Chinese FA Cup ==
=== FA Cup fixtures and results ===
April 10 3	Sichuan Jiuniu	3 – 1	Dalian Transcendence	Zigong, Sichuan
16:00 UTC+8	Zhao Jun 46'; Li Endian 53'; Ruan Jun 57'		Wang Xiaoxing 31'	Stadium: Zigong Nanhu Sports Center; Attendance: 3,613

== Player information ==
=== Transfers ===
==== In ====
No.	Pos.	Name	Age	Moving from	Type	Transfer Window	Transfer fee	Notes	Ref.
—	MF	(China) Yin Lu	29	(China) Nei Mongol Zhongyou	Transfer	Winter	—		
—	FW	(Cameroon) Yves Ekwalla Herman	27	(China) Xinjiang Tianshan Leopard	Transfer	Winter	—		
—	DF	(China) Yang Zexiang	24	(China) Tianjin TEDA	Transfer	Winter	—		
—	DF	(China) Liu Tianqi	29	(China) Beijing Renhe	Transfer	Winter	—		
—	FW	(Brazil) Rafael Silva	27	(Brazil) Bragantino	Transfer	Winter	—		
—	FW	(China) Meng Yang	29	(China) Shijiazhuang Ever Bright	Loan	Winter	—		
—	DF	(China) Li Geng	21	(China) Guangzhou Evergrande	Loan	Winter	—		
—	GK	(China) Liu Yipeng	21	Free agent	Transfer	Winter	—		
—	DF	(China) Wang Wanpeng	36	(China) Dalian Yifang	Loan	Summer	—		
—	FW	(Montenegro) Admir Adrović	30	(Montenegro) Titograd Podgorica	Transfer	Summer	—		

==== Out ====
No.	Pos.	Name	Age	Moving to	Type	Transfer Window	Transfer fee	Notes	Ref.
9	FW	(Bosnia and Herzegovina) Ivan Božić	33	—	Released	Winter	—		
16	DF	(Sweden) David Fällman	27	(Sweden) Hammarby Fotboll	Transfer	Winter	—		
19	DF	(China) Zheng Jianfeng	28	(China) Dalian Yifang	Transfer	Winter	—		
6	MF	(China) Yang Fangzhi	22	(China) Dalian Yifang	End of loan	Winter	—		
5	MF	(China) Xue Ya'nan	27	(China) Changchun Yatai	Transfer	Winter	—		
15	MF	(China) Ötkür Hesen	25	(China) Yinchuan Helanshan	Released	Winter	—		
14	MF	(China) Hu Zhaojun	37	(China) Zhejiang Yiteng	—	Summer	—		

=== Squad ===
As of 1 March 2018

Note: Flags indicate national team as defined under FIFA eligibility rules; some limited exceptions apply. Players may hold more than one non-FIFA nationality.

No.	Pos.	Nation	Player
1	GK	CHN	Cui Kai
2	DF	CHN	Wang Guanghao
3	DF	CHN	Zhao Yibo
4	MF	BIH	Eldar Hasanović
5	DF	CHN	Wang Wanpeng (on loan from Dalian Yifang)
6	FW	CHN	Meng Yang (on loan from Shijiazhuang Ever Bright)
7	DF	CHN	Yang Zexiang
8	DF	CHN	Xie Zhaoyu
9	FW	CMR	Yves Ekwalla Herman
10	FW	BRA	Rafael Silva dos Santos
11	MF	CHN	Cui Yu
12	FW	CHN	Wang Xiaoxing
15	DF	CHN	Hong Youpeng
16	FW	CHN	Dong Zhiyuan
18	DF	CHN	Fan Peipei

No.	Pos.	Nation	Player
19	DF	CHN	Liu Tianqi
20	DF	CHN	Qu Jiachen
21	DF	CHN	Liu Yuchen
22	GK	CHN	Liu Yipeng
23	MF	CHN	Yin Lu
25	MF	CHN	Quan Heng
26	GK	CHN	Chen Yongxin
27	DF	CHN	Li Geng (on loan from Guangzhou Evergrande)
28	MF	CHN	Zhang Jian
29	MF	CHN	Sheng Jun
30	FW	MNE	Admir Adrović
32	MF	CHN	Zhang Xiaolong
33	DF	CHN	Wang Hongyou
35	MF	CHN	Li Ning
36	MF	CHN	Tian Ziyi

=== Reserve squad ===
Note: Flags indicate national team as defined under FIFA eligibility rules; some limited exceptions apply. Players may hold more than one non-FIFA nationality.

No.	Pos.	Nation	Player
41	DF	CHN	Yao Diran
42	DF	CHN	Cui Binhui
43	DF	CHN	Hao Xingchen

No.	Pos.	Nation	Player
47	DF	CHN	Tian Ziyi
48	MF	CHN	Yu Ziran
49	MF	CHN	Li Ning

== Squad statistics ==
=== Appearances and goals ===
As of July 2018.

No.	Pos.	Player	Nat.	Age	League One			FA Cup			Total		
No.	Pos.	Player	Nat.	Age	App.	Starts	Goals	App.	Starts	Goals	App.	Starts	Goals
1	GK	Cui Kai	(China)	31	4	4	0	1	1	0	5	5	0
2	DF	Wang Guanghao	(China)	25	0	0	0	0	0	0	0	0	0
3	DF	Zhao Yibo	(China)	30	28	28	0	0	0	0	28	28	0
4	MF	Eldar Hasanović	(Bosnia and Herzegovina)	28	22	22	3	0	0	0	22	22	3
5	DF	Wang Wanpeng	(China)	36	17	17	0	0	0	0	17	17	0
6	FW	Meng Yang	(China)	29	4	2	0	0	0	0	4	2	0
7	DF	Yang Zexiang	(China)	24	28	27	1	0	0	0	28	27	1
8	DF	Xie Zhaoyu	(China)	21	18	12	1	1	1	0	19	13	1
9	FW	Yves Ekwalla	(Cameroon)	27	5	5	0	0	0	0	5	5	0
10	FW	Rafael Silva	(Brazil)	27	23	23	9	0	0	0	23	23	9
11	MF	Cui Yu	(China)	29	1	0	0	1	1	0	2	1	0
12	FW	Wang Xiaoxing	(China)	22	0	0	0	1	1	1	1	1	1
14	MF	Hu Zhaojun	(China)	37	11	10	2	0	0	0	11	10	2
15	DF	Hong Youpeng	(China)	23	17	11	0	0	0	0	17	11	0
16	FW	Dong Zhiyuan	(China)	29	22	11	1	1	1	0	23	12	1
18	DF	Fan Peipei	(China)	33	6	2	0	1	1	0	7	3	0
19	DF	Liu Tianqi	(China)	29	6	6	0	0	0	0	6	6	0
20	DF	Qu Jiachen	(China)	25	9	3	0	0	0	0	9	3	0
21	DF	Liu Yuchen	(China)	29	24	23	1	1	1	0	25	24	1
22	GK	Liu Yipeng	(China)	21	1	1	0	0	0	0	1	1	0
23	MF	Yin Lu	(China)	29	29	29	4	0	0	0	29	29	4
25	MF	Quan Heng	(China)	29	24	12	1	0	0	0	24	12	1
26	GK	Chen Yongxin	(China)	25	25	25	0	0	0	0	25	25	0
27	DF	Li Geng	(China)	21	24	7	1	1	1	0	25	8	1
28	MF	Zhang Jian	(China)	29	19	9	0	0	0	0	19	9	0
29	MF	Sheng Jun	(China)	28	17	6	2	0	0	0	17	6	2
30	FW	Admir Adrovic	(Montenegro)	30	8	8	0	0	0	0	8	8	0
32	MF	Zhang Xiaolong	(China)	25	0	0	0	1	1	0	1	1	0
33	DF	Wang Hongyou	(China)	33	27	27	2	0	0	0	27	27	2
35	MF	Li Ning	(China)	17	1	0	0	1	1	0	2	1	0
36	MF	Tian Ziyi	(China)	17	0	0	0	1	1	0	1	1	0
TOTALS							28			1			29

=== Goalscorers ===
Rank	Player	Super League	FA Cup	Total
1	Rafael Silva	9	0	9
2	Yin Lu	4	0	4
3	Eldar Hasanovic	3	0	3
4	Hu Zhaojun	2	0	2
4	Sheng Jun	2	0	2
4	Wang Hongyou	2	0	2
7	Dong Zhiyuan	1	0	1
7	Li Geng	1	0	1
7	Liu Yuchen	1	0	1
7	Quan Heng	1	0	1
7	Xie Zhaoyu	1	0	1
7	Yang Zexiang	1	0	1
7	Wang Xiaoxing	0	1	1
TOTALS		28	1	29

=== Disciplinary record ===
No.	Pos.	Player	League One			FA Cup			Total		
No.	Pos.	Player	Yellow card	(yellow card) (yellow-red card)	Red card	Yellow card	(yellow card) (yellow-red card)	Red card	Yellow card	(yellow card) (yellow-red card)	Red card
1	GK	Cui Kai	0	0	0	0	0	0	0	0	0
2	DF	Wang Guanghao	0	0	0	0	0	0	0	0	0
3	DF	Zhao Yibo	6	1	0	0	0	0	0	0	0
4	MF	Eldar Hasanović	3	0	0	0	0	0	0	0	0
5	DF	Wang Wanpeng	3	1	0	0	0	0	0	0	0
6	FW	Meng Yang	1	0	0	0	0	0	0	0	0
7	DF	Yang Zexiang	5	0	0	0	0	0	0	0	0
8	DF	Xie Zhaoyu	2	0	0	0	0	0	0	0	0
9	FW	Yves Ekwalla	0	0	0	0	0	0	0	0	0
10	FW	Rafael Silva	7	0	0	0	0	0	0	0	0
11	MF	Cui Yu	0	0	0	0	0	0	0	0	0
12	FW	Wang Xiaoxing	0	0	0	0	0	0	0	0	0
14	MF	Hu Zhaojun	1	0	0	0	0	0	0	0	0
15	DF	Hong Youpeng	2	0	0	0	0	0	0	0	0
16	FW	Dong Zhiyuan	1	0	0	0	0	0	0	0	0
18	DF	Fan Peipei	2	0	0	0	0	0	0	0	0
19	DF	Liu Tianqi	2	0	0	0	0	0	0	0	0
20	DF	Qu Jiachen	2	1	0	0	0	0	0	0	0
21	DF	Liu Yuchen	5	0	0	0	0	0	0	0	0
22	GK	Liu Yipeng	0	0	0	1	0	0	0	0	0
23	MF	Yin Lu	5	0	0	0	0	0	0	0	0
25	MF	Quan Heng	1	0	0	0	0	0	0	0	0
26	GK	Chen Yongxin	5	0	0	0	0	0	0	0	0
27	DF	Li Geng	2	0	0	0	0	0	0	0	0
28	MF	Zhang Jian	2	0	0	0	0	0	0	0	0
29	MF	Sheng Jun	2	0	0	0	0	0	0	0	0
30	FW	Admir Adrovic	2	0	0	0	0	0	0	0	0
32	MF	Zhang Xiaolong	0	0	0	0	0	0	0	0	0
33	DF	Wang Hongyou	7	0	1	0	0	0	0	0	0
35	MF	Li Ning	0	0	0	0	0	0	0	0	0
36	MF	Tian Ziyi	0	0	0	0	0	0	0	0	0
TOTALS			68	3	1	0	0	0	68	3	1
