= 2016 Dalian Transcendence F.C. season =

Dalian Transcendence F.C.
- Chairman: Lin Lefeng; Li Xiaoyong
- Manager: Liu Zhongchang; Sun Feng (caretaker); Ermin Siljak; Rusmir Cviko (caretaker)
- Stadium: Jinzhou Stadium
- League One: 14th
- FA Cup: 2nd round
- Top goalscorer: Jaílton Paraíba (12 goals)

The 2016 Dalian Transcendence F.C. season is the club's 3rd season, and the 1st season to compete in China League One.

== Background ==
After promoted from League Two, the team claimed that their goal in the new season was to balance their cost, and to prevent from relegation. Liu Zhongchang stayed as the manager, but resigned after just a few matches due to a claimed"physical issue". They signed Ermin Siljak, former Dalian Wanda F.C. player, as their manager, and later sacked him to replace again with his assistant manager, Rusmir Cviko.

== Kits ==
Home
Away
Goalkeeper
home
Goalkeeper
away

== China League One ==
=== League table ===
Pos	Team	Pld	W	D	L	GF	GA	GD	Pts	Promotion, qualification or relegation
12	Meizhou Hakka	30	11	6	13	48	50	−2	39 (Note: Head-to-head results: Xinjiang 1–0 Meizhou, Meizhou 1–1 Xinjiang.)	
13	Zhejiang Yiteng	30	11	5	14	39	49	−10	38 (Note: Head-to-head results: Zhejiang 1–0 Dalian Transcendence, Dalian Transcendence 2–2 Zhejiang.)	
14	Dalian Transcendence	30	10	8	12	32	36	−4	38	
15	Qingdao Jonoon (R)	30	8	9	13	30	43	−13	33	Relegation to League Two
16	Hunan Billows (R)	30	2	6	22	16	61	−45	12	Relegation to League Two

Updated to match(es) played on 22 October 2016. Source: sports.sina.com
Rules for classification: 1) Points; 2) Head-to-head points; 3) Head-to-head goal difference; 4) Head-to-head goals scored; 5) Goal difference; 6) Goals scored; 7) Disciplinary points (1 point for each yellow card, 3 points for each red card)
(R) Relegated

=== Results summary ===
Overall								Home						Away					
Pld	W	D	L	GF	GA	GD	Pts	W	D	L	GF	GA	GD	W	D	L	GF	GA	GD
30	10	8	12	32	36	−4	38	6	4	5	19	16	+3	4	4	7	13	20	−7

=== Position by round ===
Round	1	2	3	4	5	6	7	8	9	10	11	12	13	14	15	16	17	18	19	20	21	22	23	24	25	26	27	28	29	30
Ground	A	H	A	H	A	H	A	H	A	H	A	A	H	A	H	H	A	H	A	H	A	H	A	H	A	H	H	A	H	A
Result	W	D	L	L	L	L	W	L	L	W	L	D	W	D	D	L	L	W	W	L	D	W	L	D	W	W	W	L	D	D
Position	2	3	9	13	14	15	13	13	14	14	14	13	12	13	13	14	15	14	12	14	14	13	13	13	12	12	10	12	14	14

Updated to match(es) played on 22 October 2016. Source: Competitive matches
A = Away; H = Home; W = Win; D = Draw; L = Loss

=== League fixtures and results ===
	Date	Time	H/A	Res.F–A	Att.	Opponent	Goalscorers and disciplined players		Location	Stadium	Report
	Date	Time	H/A	Res.F–A	Att.	Opponent	Dalian Transcendence	Opponent	Location	Stadium	Report
1	Mar 13	15:30	A	3-1	5,070	Shanghai Shenxin	Zhang Jian 30', 83'; Han Xu (yellow card) 51'; Liu Huan (yellow card) 65'; Quan Heng 66'	Jiang Jiajun (yellow card) 69'; Daniel Chima Chukwu 80'	Shanghai	Jinshan Sports Centre	
2	Mar 19	15:00	H	0-0	8,251	Wuhan Zall	Han Xu (yellow card) 42'; Liu Tao (yellow card) 68'; Fejzullahu (yellow card) 74'	Ming Tian (yellow card) 43'; Michael Barrantes (yellow card) 51'; Yang Chaosheng (yellow card) 68'	Dalian	Jinzhou Stadium	
3	Apr 2	16:30	A	1-3	8,358	Beijing Renhe	Zhang Gong (yellow card) 12'; Fejzullahu 75'	Zhang Yuan (yellow card) 21'; David Fallman 36' (o.g.); Wang Qiang 57'; Nikica Jelavic 67'	Beijing	Beijing Fengtai Stadium	
4	Apr 10	16:00	H	0-2	17,721	Dalian Yifang	Fejzullahu (yellow card) 43'; Zhang Jian (yellow card) 65'; Xue Ya'nan (yellow card) 76'	Nyasha Mushekwi 26'; Eddy Francis (yellow card) 48'; Cao Xuan 77'	Dalian	Jinzhou Stadium	
5	Apr 17	16:30	A	0-2	14,718	Tianjin Quanjian	Wang Hongyou (yellow card) 40'; Quan Heng (yellow card) 63'	Wang Jie (yellow card) 33'; Jádson 36', 76'; Luís Fabiano (yellow card) 62'	Tianjin	Haihe Educational Football Stadium	
6	Apr 24	16:00	H	1-2	3,215	Guizhou Zhicheng	Su Di (yellow card) 45'; Jailton Paraiba (yellow card) 60' (goal) 83'; Du Wenxiang (yellow card) 71'	Mazola 10'; Jiang Liang (yellow card) 51'; Yves Ekwalla Herman 64' (yellow card) 90+3'; Wang Jun (yellow card) 75'	Dalian	Jinzhou Stadium	
7	May 2	16:30	A	2-1	6,398	Meizhou Hakka	Du Wenxiang 9', 55'; Guo Wei (yellow card) 66'	Japa 45+2'	Meizhou	Wuhua County Stadium	
8	May 7	19:00	H	1-2	3,060	Qingdao Huanghai	Paraiba 86'; Zhao Yibo (yellow card) 90+2'	Martí Crespí 6'; Gao Xiang (yellow card) 35'; Yuri 36'; Fan Lingjiang (yellow card) 79'; Liu Peng (yellow card) 83'; Shi Zhe (yellow card) 90+2'	Dalian	Jinzhou Stadium	
9	May 15	19:00	A	0-1	1,856	Zhejiang Yiteng	Zhang Gong (yellow card) 38'; Wang Hongyou (yellow card) 45+1'	Li Xudong (yellow card) 24'; Li Jian (yellow card) 32' (yellow-red card) 90+2'; Rodrigo Paulista 38'; Wang Dalong (yellow card) 75'	Shaoxing	China Textile City Sports Center	
10	May 21	19:00	H	3-1	3,331	Hunan Billows	Paraiba 28', 40'; Hu Zhaojun 33'; Du Wenxiang (yellow card) 34'; Su Di (yellow card) 90+4'	Cao Huan (yellow card) 21'; Yao Jiangshan (yellow card) 27'; Cabezas (yellow card) 34'; Li Xinyu 45+1'; Cao Guodong (yellow card) 70'	Dalian	Jinzhou Stadium	
11	May 28	19:35	A	0-2	3,895	Beijing BG	Liu Tao (yellow card) 23'; Du Wenxiang (yellow card) 57'	Tang Jiashu (yellow card) 45'; Leke James 48'; Jin Hui 89'	Beijing	Olympic Sports Centre (Beijing)	
12	Jun 5	18:00	A	0-0	2,781	Xinjiang Tianshan Leopard	Zhang Gong (yellow card) 44'; Zhao Yibo (yellow card) 59'; Jailton Paraiba (yellow card) 80'	Wang Kang (yellow card) 38'; Tursun Nurmemet (yellow card) 90+2'	Urumqi	Xinjiang Sports Centre	
13	Jun 12	19:00	H	2-0	3,433	Nei Mongol Zhongyou	Paraiba (yellow card) 20' (goal) 90'; Hu Zhaojun 45'; Zhao Yibo (yellow card) 75'; Wang Hongyou (yellow card) 88'; Xue Ya'nan (yellow card) 90+3'	Lin Kun (yellow card) 22'; Luo Hao (yellow card) 42'; Yin Lu (yellow card) 45'	Dalian	Jinzhou Stadium	
14	Jun 18	19:35	A	0-0	8,746	Shenzhen	Liu Huan (yellow card) 42'; Hu Zhaojun (yellow card) 45+2'; Paraiba (yellow card) 67'; Wang Hongyou (yellow card) 71'; Guo Wei (red card) 90+5'	Huang Xin (yellow card) 22'; Aboubakar (penalty missed) 44	Shenzhen	Shenzhen Stadium	
15	Jun 25	19:30	H	0-0	3,352	Qingdao Jonoon	Zhang Gong (yellow card) 34'; Hu Zhaojun (yellow card) 82'; Zhao YIbo (yellow card) 88'	Eddie Hernández (yellow card) 19'; Guo Liang (yellow card) 20'; Wang Jianwen (yellow card) 86'	Dalian	Jinzhou Stadium	
16	Jul 3	19:30	H	0-4	2,891	Shanghai Shenxin	Zhang Jian (yellow card) 49'	Davi 34'; Daniel Chima Chukwu (yellow card) 41' (goal) 66'; Hu Mingfei (yellow card) 41'; Ye Chongqiu 41'; Sun Yifan (yellow card) 64'; Wu Yizhen 85'; Jia Tianzi (yellow card) 89'	Dalian	Jinzhou Stadium	
17	Jul 10	19:35	A	0-1	3,563	Wuhan Zall	Han Xu (yellow card) 27'; Paraiba (yellow card) 55'; Zhao Yibo (yellow card) 90+5'	Guto 5'; Qiu Tianyi (yellow card) 31'; Sun Shoubo (yellow card) 81'; Ke Zhao (yellow card) 88' (yellow-red card) 90+5'; Luo Yi (yellow card) 89'	Wuhan	Xinhua Road Stadium	
18	Jul 16	19:30	H	3-1	2,862	Beijing Renhe	Du Wenxiang 10'; Zhang Jian (yellow card) 22'; Paraiba 53'; Han ZXu 65'; Zhao Yibo (yellow card) 90'; Nan Yunqi (yellow card) 90+4'	Liu Tianqi (yellow card) 35'; Wang Qiang (yellow card) 59'; Zhang Chenglin (yellow card) 68'; Han Peng 77'	Dalian	Jinzhou Stadium	
19	Jul 23	19:00	A	2-1	20,392	Dalian Yifang	Zhang Gong 50'; William Paulista 59'; Zhao Yibo (yellow card) 90+2'	Wang Wanpeng 3'; Sun Bo (yellow card) 89'; Cao Xuan (yellow card) 90+1'	Dalian	Dalian Sports Center	
20	Jul 30	19:30	H	0-2	5,802	Tianjin Quanjian	David Fallman (yellow card) 22'; Zhang Gong (yellow card) 70'; Zhao Yibo (yellow card) 80'	Liu Yiming (yellow card) 33'; Geuvânio 37', 76'; Zhao Xuri (yellow card) 64'; Luis Fabiano (yellow card) 65'; Yan Zihao (yellow card) 88'	Dalian	Jinzhou Stadium	
21	Aug 6	17:00	A	1-1	7,351	Guizhou Zhicheng			Guiyang	Guiyang Olympic Sports Center	
22	Aug 13	19:30	H	2-0	2,741	Meizhou Hakka			Dalian	Jinzhou Stadium	
23	Aug 20	19:30	A	0-2	7,265	Qingdao Huanghai			Qingdao	Qingdao Guoxin Stadium	
24	Aug 28	19:30	H	2-2	2,077	Zhejiang Yiteng			Dalian	Jinzhou Stadium	
25	Sep 3	16:30	A	4-1	1,221	Hunan Billows			Yiyang	Yiyang Stadium	
26	Sep 10	19:30	H	2-0	1,821	Beijing BG			Dalian	Jinzhou Stadium	
27	Sep 17	19:30	H	3-0	2,563	Xinjiang Tianshan Leopard			Dalian	Jinzhou Stadium	
28	Sep 24	19:35	A	0-4	7,856	Nei Mongol Zhongyou			Hohhot	Hohhot City Stadium	
29	Oct 15	15:30	H	0-0	2,132	Shenzhen			Dalian	Jinzhou Stadium	
30	Oct 22	15:30	A	0-0	1.068	Qingdao Jonoon			Qingdao	Qingdao Tiantai Stadium	

== Chinese FA Cup ==
=== FA Cup fixtures and results ===
13 April 2016 2	Chengdu Qbao	3 – 0	Dalian Transcendence	Chengdu
16:00 CST	Xia Jin 25'; Liu Yingchen 50' (o.g.); Tan Si 87'			Stadium: Dujiangyan Phoenix Stadium; Attendance: 358; Referee: Chen Xin

== Player information ==
=== Transfers ===
==== In ====
No.	Pos.	Name	Age	Moving from	Type	Transfer Window	Transfer fee	Notes	Ref.
10	FW	(Kosovo) Erton Fejzullahu	27	(China) Beijing Guoan	Transfer	Winter	—	—	
7	FW	(Brazil) Jaílton Paraíba	25	(China) Yanbian Funde	Transfer	Winter	—	—	
16	DF	(Sweden) David Fallman	25	(Sweden) Gefle IF	Transfer	Winter	—	—	
33	MF	(China) Wang Hongyou	30	(China) Hangzhou Greentown	Transfer	Winter	—	—	
12	MF	(China) Zhang Jian	26	(China) Wuhan Zall	Transfer	Winter	—	—	
5	DF	(China) Xue Ya'nan	25	(China) Qingdao Huanghai	Transfer	Winter	—	—	
	MF	(China) Liu Yingchen	23	(China) Dalian Yifang	Transfer	Winter	—	—	
	FW	(China) Nan Yunqi	22	(China) Dalian Yifang	Transfer	Winter	—	—	
	MF	(China) Han Xu	27	(China) Zhejiang Yiteng	Transfer	Winter	—	—	
	GK	(China) Cui Kai	28	—	Transfer	Winter	—	—	
	MF	(China) Sheng Jun	25	—	Transfer	Winter	—	—	
9	FW	(Brazil) William Martins Gomes	30	(Brazil) Sampaio Corrêa	Transfer	Summer	—	—	

==== Out ====
No.	Pos.	Name	Age	Moving to	Type	Transfer Window	Transfer fee	Notes	Ref.
	MF	(China) Cong Zhen	19	(China) Shanghai Shenhua Reserves	Transfer	Winter	—	—	
	DF	(China) Zhang Hongjiang	18	(Portugal) Gondomar B	Transfer	Winter	—	—	
	MF	(China) Yan Song	34	—	Transfer	Winter	—	—	

=== Squad ===
As of 4 March 2016

Note: Flags indicate national team as defined under FIFA eligibility rules; some limited exceptions apply. Players may hold more than one non-FIFA nationality.

No.	Pos.	Nation	Player
1	GK	(China) CHN	Cui Kai
2	DF	(China) CHN	Wang Guanghao
3	DF	(China) CHN	Zhao Yibo
4	MF	(China) CHN	Zhang Gong
5	MF	(China) CHN	Xue Ya'nan
6	MF	(China) CHN	Han Xu
7	FW	(Brazil) BRA	Jaílton Paraíba
8	MF	(China) CHN	Jing Deyang
11	MF	(China) CHN	Su Di
12	DF	(China) CHN	Cui Yu
14	MF	(China) CHN	Hu Zhaojun
15	DF	(China) CHN	Liu Huan
16	DF	(Sweden) SWE	David Fällman
18	DF	(China) CHN	Hao Xingchen

No.	Pos.	Nation	Player
19	FW	(Brazil) BRA	William Martins Gomes
21	DF	(China) CHN	Liu Yuchen
22	GK	(China) CHN	Chen Yongxin
23	GK	(China) CHN	Guo Wei
25	MF	(China) CHN	Quan Heng
27	DF	(China) CHN	Tang Lizhen
28	MF	(China) CHN	Zhang Jian
29	MF	(China) CHN	Sheng Jun
31	FW	(China) CHN	Du Wenxiang
32	FW	(China) CHN	Nan Yunqi
33	MF	(China) CHN	Wang Hongyou
36	MF	(China) CHN	Liu Tao
37	MF	(China) CHN	Liu Yingchen
