= 2012 Dalian Aerbin F.C. season =

Dalian Aerbin F.C.
- Chairman: Li Ming
- Manager: Chang Woe-Ryong (to 3 April); Aleksandar Stanojević (from 4 April)
- Stadium: Jinzhou Stadium
- Super League: 5th
- FA Cup: Quarter-finals
- Top goalscorer: Peter Utaka (20 goals)
- Highest home attendance: 25,791
- Lowest home attendance: 7,954
- Average home league attendance: 15,774

The 2012 Dalian Aerbin F.C. season is the third season in club history, and the first season in the Chinese Super League, promoted after finishing 1st in the 2011 China League One.

== Overview ==
Before the season started, Aerbin signed Korean manager Chang Woe-Ryong for 3 years, hoping to improve the team with his counterattack tactics, but announced his resignation in April, and replaced him with Aleksandar Stanojević. The team ended 5th in the league, failed to enter AFC Champions League.

== Players ==
Note: Flags indicate national team as defined under FIFA eligibility rules; some limited exceptions apply. Players may hold more than one non-FIFA nationality.

No.	Pos.	Nation	Player
1	GK	CHN	Yu Ziqian (vice captain)
3	DF	CHN	Zhao Hejing
4	DF	CHN	Ji Zhengyu
5	DF	CHN	Jin Pengxiang
6	MF	CHN	Zhu Xiaogang
7	MF	CHN	Wu Qing
8	FW	BRA	Fábio Rochemback
9	MF	AUS	Mile Sterjovski
10	MF	CHN	Wang Jun
11	FW	NGR	Peter Utaka
12	MF	CHN	Zhou Tong
13	DF	GHA	Lee Addy
14	MF	CHN	Hu Zhaojun
15	MF	CHN	Yin Lu
16	DF	AUS	Daniel Mullen
17	DF	CHN	Sun Haosheng
19	FW	CHI	Gustavo Canales

No.	Pos.	Nation	Player
20	MF	MLI	Seydou Keita
21	DF	CHN	Chen Lei
22	FW	CHN	Yu Dabao
23	GK	CHN	Lei Tao
24	DF	CHN	Liu Yu
26	MF	CHN	Jiang Wenjun
27	DF	CHN	Chang Lin (captain)
28	DF	CHN	Wang Hongyou
29	MF	CHN	Sun Bo
30	FW	CHN	Yang Lin
31	GK	CHN	Zhan Lunhao
32	DF	CHN	Lü Zheng
33	GK	CHN	Liu Weiguo
36	MF	CHN	Li Qi
37	MF	CHN	Quan Heng
38	FW	CHN	Chen Hongquan
40	FW	CHN	Dong Xuesheng

== Chinese Super League ==
=== League table ===
Pos	Team	Pld	W	D	L	GF	GA	GD	Pts	Qualification or relegation
3	Beijing Guoan	30	14	6	10	34	35	−1	48	2013 AFC Champions League group stage (Note: Guizhou Moutai qualified for the 2013 AFC Champions League because league champions Guangzhou Evergrande also won the 2012 Chinese FA Cup.)
4	Guizhou Moutai	30	12	9	9	44	33	+11	45	2013 AFC Champions League group stage
5	Dalian Aerbin	30	11	11	8	51	46	+5	44 (Note: Dalian 1–2 Changchun; Changchun 1–2 Dalian)	
6	Changchun Yatai	30	12	8	10	37	40	−3	44	
7	Guangzhou R&F	30	13	3	14	47	49	−2	42	

Source: Chinese Super League (in Chinese)
Rules for classification: 1) points; 2) goal difference; 3) number of goals scored; 4) head-to-head goals scored; 5) goal difference; 6) goals scored; 7) disciplinary points (1 point for each yellow card, 3 points for each red card). Head-to-Head: Only used at the end of the season when two or more teams need the head-to-head rules to break a tie.

=== League fixtures and results ===
	Date	Time _{UTC+8}	H/A	Opponent	Res.F–A	Att.	Goalscorers and disciplined players		Location	Stadium	Report
	Date	Time _{UTC+8}	H/A	Opponent	Res.F–A	Att.	Dalian Aerbin	Opponent	Location	Stadium	Report
1	Sun Mar 11	18:30	A	Tianjin TEDA	0–1	7,979	Zhao Hejing (yellow card) 11'; Gustavo Canales (yellow card) 12'; Chen Lei (red card) 68'	Li Weifeng (yellow card) 23'; Nie Tao (yellow card) 45'; Sjoerd Ars 82'; Akpo Sodje (yellow card) 88'	Tianjin	TEDA Football Stadium	Report
2	Sun Mar 18	15:00	H	Dalian Shide	3–3	25,791	Gustavo Canales 45+2'; Chang Lin 49'; Dong Xuesheng 69'	James Chamanga 44'; Zhao Mingjian (yellow card) 54'; Park Dong-Hyuk 59'; Yang Boyu 85'; Yan Feng (yellow card) 90'	Dalian	Jinzhou Stadium	Report
3	Sat Mar 24	18:30	A	Shandong Luneng	3–3	28,117	Yu Dabao 2'; Gustavo Canales 5'; Zhou Tong 16' (yellow card) 45'; Chang Lin (yellow card) 36' (yellow-red card) 68'	Roda Antar 7'; Obina 12', 61'; Wang Qiang (yellow card) 76'	Jinan	Shandong Provincial Stadium	Report
4	Sat Mar 31	15:30	H	Liaoning Whowin	1–1	7,954	Yu Dabao 86'	Ding Jie (yellow card) 11'; Jin Taiyan 55'; Kim Yoo-jin (yellow card) 64'; Zhang Lu (yellow card) 69'; Zhao Junzhe (yellow card) 72'; Zheng Tao (yellow card) 84'	Dalian	Jinzhou Stadium	Report
5	Sat Apr 7	15:40	A	Shanghai Shenxin	1–3	3,950	Gustavo Canales 64'	Wang Yun 13'; Anselmo 19' (pen.); Xu Wen (yellow card) 27'; Liu Dianzuo (yellow card) 62'; Zhao Zuojun (yellow card) 67'; Ye Chongqiu 76'; Jaílton Paraíba (yellow card) 82'	Shanghai	Jinshan Sports Centre	Report
6	Sat Apr 14	19:00	H	Henan Jianye	1–0	12,981	Gustavo Canales 90+6' (pen.)	Zhang Li (yellow card) 37'; Christopher Katongo (yellow card) 44' (yellow-red card) 75'; Zhao Peng (yellow card) 90'	Dalian	Jinzhou Stadium	Report
7	Sun Apr 22	15:30	A	Guizhou Renhe	2–2	21,060	Zhou Tong (yellow card) 13'; Wang Hongyou (yellow card) 15'; Lee Addy (yellow card) 19'; Fábio Rochemback 49' (yellow card) 52'; Jin Pengxiang (yellow card) 80' (yellow-red card) 89'; Peter Utaka 90+4'	Zhang Chenglin 11'; Zlatan Muslimović 31'; Zhang Lie (yellow card) 40'; Sun Jihai (red card) 76'; Chen Jie (yellow card) 85' (yellow-red card) 87'	Guiyang	Guiyang Olympic Sports Center	Report
8	Sat Apr 28	15:00	H	Changchun Yatai	1–2	8,198	Mile Sterjovski (yellow card) 20'; Wang Hongyou (yellow card) 39'; Peter Utaka 49'	Weldon 2', 19'; Marko Ljubinković (yellow card) 24'; Lü Jianjun (yellow card) 87'	Dalian	Jinzhou Stadium	Report
9	Sun May 6	19:35	A	Guangzhou Evergrande	1–2	32,468	Lee Addy (yellow card) 9'; Yin Lu 52'; Yu Ziqian (yellow card) 67'	Muriqui 41'; Zheng Zhi (yellow card) 65'; Cléo 68' (pen.); Sun Xiang (yellow card) 83'	Guangzhou	Tianhe Stadium	Report
10	Sun May 13	15:30	A	Qingdao Jonoon	3–1	7,216	Mile Sterjovski (yellow card) 27'; Peter Utaka 43', 85'; Yu Dabao 49'; Yin Lu (yellow card) 65'	Liu Jian 7'; Guo Liang (yellow card) 17'; Gabriel Melkam (yellow card) 81'	Qingdao	Qingdao Tiantai Stadium	Report
11	Sat May 19	15:30	H	Jiangsu Sainty	1–1	15,061	Sterjovski (yellow card) 10'; Wang Hongyou (yellow card) 14'; Canales 73' (pen.) (yellow card) 90'	Jiang Jiajun (yellow card) 9'; Cristian Dănălache 38'	Dalian	Jinzhou Stadium	Report
12	Fri May 25	19:30	A	Beijing Guoan	0–1	36,871	Yu Dabao (yellow card) 11'; Wu Qing (yellow card) 63'	Wang Xiaolong 27' (yellow card) 72'	Beijing	Workers Stadium	Report
13	Sat Jun 16	15:30	H	Guangzhou R&F	2–1	12,861	Yu Dabao (yellow card) 45'; Canales 49'; Wang Hongyou 54'; Yin Lu (yellow card) 71'	Davi (red card) 9'; Jumar (yellow card) 26'; Rostyn Griffiths (yellow card) 37'; Li Zhe (yellow card) 45'; Rafael Coelho 52'	Dalian	Jinzhou Stadium	Report
14	Sun Jun 24	19:45	A	Shanghai Shenhua	2–2	10,323	Sterjovski (yellow card) 41'; Zhou Tong 73'; Peter Utaka 89'	Feng Renliang 13', 69'; Dai Lin (yellow card) 90'	Shanghai	Hongkou Football Stadium	Report
15	Sat Jun 30	19:00	H	Hangzhou Greentown	1–1	12,098	Lee Addy (yellow card) 43'; Peter Utaka 52'; Zhao Hejing (yellow card) 79'	Renatinho (yellow card) 34'; Du Wei 38'; Jeong Dong-ho (yellow card) 46'; Wang Song (yellow card) 55'	Dalian	Jinzhou Stadium	Report
16	Sat Jul 7	19:00	H	Tianjin TEDA	1–1	15,761	Peter Utaka 63'; Zhao Hejing (yellow card) 63'	Mao Biao 21' (yellow card) 45'; Bai Yuefeng (yellow card) 26'; Lucian Goian 53'; Sjoerd Ars (yellow card) 79'; Liao Bochao (yellow card) 89'	Dalian	Jinzhou Stadium	Report
17	Sat Jul 14	19:00	A	Dalian Shide	2–3	28,921	Yu Dabao 20'; Peter Utaka 57' (pen.)	James Chamanga 3', 18'; Zhao Honglüe (yellow card) 26'; Martin Kamburov 53'; Zhu Ting (yellow card) 58'	Dalian	Jinzhou Stadium	Report
18	Sat Jul 21	19:00	H	Shandong Luneng	5–2	21,058	Fábio Rochemback (yellow card) 19' (goal) 27'; Yu Dabao 23'; Peter Utaka 45+3', 65', 86'; Daniel Mullen (yellow card) 68'	Geng Xiaofeng (yellow card) 36'; José Ortigoza (yellow card) 48'; Wang Yongpo 63' (pen.) (yellow card) 74'; Du Wei 68' (yellow card) 77'	Dalian	Jinzhou Stadium	Report
19	Sat Jul 28	19:30	A	Liaoning Whowin	3–5	18,749	Peter Utaka (yellow card) 19' (goal) 70'; Daniel Mullen 42'; Dong Xuesheng 85'	Wu Gaojun (yellow card) 7'; Zhang Jingyang 15'; Yu Hanchao 26', 47'; Yang Xu 29', 59'; Wang Liang (yellow card) 90+2'	Shenyang	Tiexi New District Sports Center	Report
20	Sun Aug 5	19:00	H	Shanghai Shenxin	1–1	15,481	Peter Utaka 29' (pen.); Wang Jun (yellow card) 41'; Yin Lu (yellow card) 52'	Jonas Salley 82'	Dalian	Jinzhou Stadium	Report
21	Sat Aug 11	19:45	A	Henan Jianye	2–1	19,559	Peter Utaka 41' (yellow card) 62'; Jin Pengxiang (yellow card) 47'; Wang Jun (yellow card) 57'; Yu Dabao (yellow card) 69'; Zhou Tong 84'; Seydou Keita (yellow card) 90+4'	Isaac Chansa (yellow card) 66'; Netto 88'	Zhengzhou	Hanghai Stadium	Report
22	Sat Aug 18	19:00	H	Guizhou Renhe	2–1	13,797	Lee Addy (yellow card) 28'; Seydou Keita 36'; Yu Dabao (yellow card) 51'; Peter Utaka 90' (pen.); Liu Weiguo (yellow card) 90+4'	Li Chunyu (yellow card) 31'; Yang Hao (yellow card) 55'; Rafa Jordà 84' (yellow card) 90+5'; Zlatan Muslimovic (yellow card) 90+5'	Dalian	Jinzhou Stadium	Report
23	Sat Aug 25	19:35	A	Changchun Yatai	2–1	10,125	Peter Utaka 2', 87'; Chen Lei (yellow card) 9'; Seydou Keita (yellow card) 86'	Wang Dong 23' (pen.); Kassio Fernandes Magalhães (yellow card) 40'; Cao Tianbao (yellow card) 81'	Changchun	Development Area Stadium	Report
24	Thu Sep 13	19:00	H	Guangzhou Evergrande	0–0	17,688	Hu Zhaojun (yellow card) 90'	Huang Jiaqiang (yellow card) 31'; Zhang Linpeng (yellow card) 81'	Dalian	Jinzhou Stadium	Report
25	Sat Sep 22	19:00	H	Qingdao Jonoon	2–1	17,801	Seydou Keita 34', 55'; Zhu Xiaogang (yellow card) 49'; Liu Weiguo (yellow card) 63'; Wang Jun (yellow card) 83'	Leonardo (yellow card) 37'; Bruno Meneghel 85'	Dalian	Jinzhou Stadium	Report
26	Sun Sep 30	19:40	A	Jiangsu Sainty	2–3	23,537	Rochemback 52'; Zhou Tong 68' (yellow card) 69'; Wang Jun (yellow card) 75'; Jin Pengxiang (yellow card) 90+4'	Ji Xiang 4'; Kamoliddin Tajiev (yellow card) 26'; Cristian Dănălache 40', 90' (pen.); Ren Hang (yellow card) 66'; Jiang Jiajun (yellow card) 72'	Nanjing	Nanjing Olympic Sports Centre	Report
27	Sat Oct 6	15:30	H	Beijing Guoan	3–1	21,152	Seydou Keita 36'; Peter Utaka (yellow card) 45+2' (goal) 45+6', 74'; Rochemback (yellow card) 56'; Hu Zhaojun (yellow card) 88'	Zhang Xinxin (yellow card) 39'; Piao Cheng (yellow card) 45+2'; Xu Yunlong (yellow card) 54'; Wang Hongyou 86' (o.g.); Yang Yun (yellow card) 88'	Dalian	Jinzhou Stadium	
28	Sun Oct 21	16:00	A	Guangzhou R&F	2–1	15,013	Liu Yu 5' (yellow card) 70'; Daniel Mullen (yellow card) 16'; Peter Utaka (yellow card) 53'; Rochemback 63'	Gao Zengxiang (yellow card) 49'; Xu Bo (yellow card) 64'; Liang Yanfeng 72'	Guangzhou	Yuexiushan Stadium	Report
29	Sat Oct 27	15:30	H	Shanghai Shenhua	0–0	18,921	Zhou Tong (yellow card) 2'; Zhu Xiaogang (yellow card) 66'	Zheng Kaimu (yellow card) 67'	Dalian	Jinzhou Stadium	Report
30	Sat Nov 3	14:30	A	Hangzhou Greentown	2–1	10,782	Yu Dabao 35'; Liu Yu (yellow card) 45'; Wang Jun (yellow card) 46'; Peter Utaka 56'	Wang Song 49' (pen.); Jeong Dong-ho (yellow card) 77'	Hangzhou	Hangzhou Huanglong Stadium	Report

== Chinese FA Cup ==
27 June 2012 3	Dalian Aerbin	2 – 1	BIT F.C.	Dalian
19:00	Hu Zhaojun 34'; Zhou Tong 42'	Report	Matías Alonso 61'	Stadium: Jinzhou Stadium; Attendance: 3,819; Referee: Guo Baolong

18 July 2012 4	Dalian Aerbin	2 – 0	Shenyang Shenbei	Dalian
19:00	Addy 31'; Hu Zhaojun 90+5'	Report		Stadium: Jinzhou Stadium; Attendance: 3,891; Referee: Li Jun

1 Aug 2012 Quarter-finals	Guangzhou Evergrande	1 – 0	Dalian Aerbin	Guangzhou
19:00 CST	Cléo 10'		Zhu Xiaogang (yellow card) 25'; Wang Hongyou (yellow card) 51'	Stadium: Tianhe Stadium; Attendance: 28,686; Referee: Wang Di
