= Li Ning (footballer) =

Chinese footballer (born 2001)

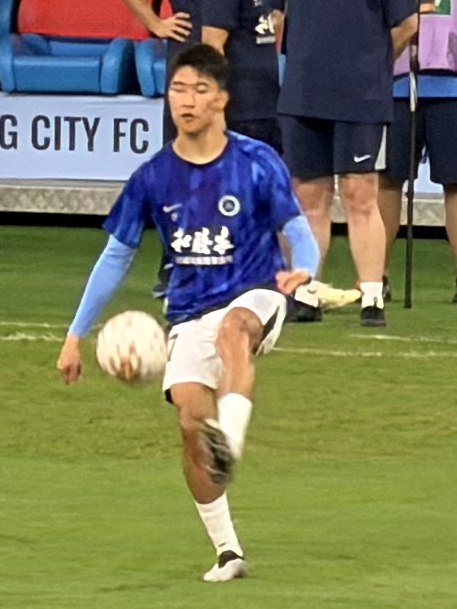
- Li Ning in April 2026

Personal information
- Full name: Li Ning
- Date of birth: 20 October 2001 (age 25)
- Place of birth: Shangcai County, Henan, China
- Height: 1.75 m (5 ft 9 in)
- Position: Winger

Team information
- Current team: Shenzhen Peng City
- Number: 17

Youth career
- 2013–2016: Dalian FA
- 2016–2018: Dalian Transcendence
- 2021: Shenzhen FC

Senior career*
Years	Team	Apps	(Gls)
2018	Dalian Transcendence	1	(0)
2022–2023	Shenzhen FC	25	(0)
2024–2025	Meizhou Hakka	20	(0)
2025–	Shenzhen Peng City	21	(1)
- * Club domestic league appearances and goals as of 22 November 2026

Li Ning (simplified Chinese: 李宁; traditional Chinese: 李寧; pinyin: Lǐ Níng; born 20 October 2001) is a Chinese professional footballer who plays as a winger for Chinese Super League club Shenzhen Peng City.

== Early life ==
Born in the province of Henan to parents from Henan and Shandong, Li Ning moved to the city of Dalian when he was eight months old. His first contact with football came when he was nine years old, at Dalian Ganjingzi District Huaxi Primary School, the primary school which he attended. He showed promise in the school team, and so he was transferred to Ganjingzi Youth Sports School to pursue a footballing career.

== Career ==
=== Dalian Transcendence ===
At the start of the 2018 season, Li Ning was named in the first-team squad for China League One side Dalian Transcendence. On 10 April 2018, Li Ning, aged 16 years and 172 days, started the game and provided an assist on his debut for Dalian Transcendence in a Chinese FA Cup third round tie with Sichuan Jiuniu, becoming the youngest ever player to make an appearance, as well as becoming the youngest ever assist provider, in the competition. He made his league debut for Dalian Transcendence on 28 October 2018, in a match against Beijing Enterprises, as a substitute for Admir Adrović in the 65th minute.

=== Shenzhen FC ===
After the dissolution of Dalian Transcendence after the 2018 season, Li Ning joined the Shenzhen FC youth setup. In the 2022 Chinese Super League season, Li was promoted to the Shenzhen first-team. On 19 December 2022, he made his debut for Shenzhen in an 8–0 loss against Shandong Taishan. Under manager Chen Tao in the 2023 season, Li Ning gained more playing time with the club, making 24 appearances in all competitions. In a league match against Dalian Pro on 13 May 2023, Li Ning provided an assist for Frank Acheampong in the 92nd minute to secure all three points for Shenzhen in a 2–1 win. On 8 July 2023, Li Ning was sent off in a match against Beijing Guoan in the 41st minute, as Shenzhen went on to lose the match 5–0. At the end of the season, Li Ning's Shenzhen suffered relegation from the Chinese Super League in the 2023 season, and the club subsequently folded in January 2024.

=== Meizhou Hakka ===
On 27 February 2024, Li Ning made a free transfer to Chinese Super League side Meizhou Hakka. Li Ning made his debut for Meizhou Hakka on 3 March 2024, in a league game that ended in a 2–0 loss to Shanghai Shenhua. On 9 March, he provided two assists for Tyrone Conraad, as Meizhou Hakka drew 2–2 away at Henan FC.

=== Shenzhen Peng City ===
On 23 June 2025, Li made a free transfer to Chinese Super League club Shenzhen Peng City. On his debut on 30 June 2025, he scored the opener for Shenzhen Peng City in an eventual 2–1 home defeat to Shanghai Port.

== Career statistics ==
=== Club ===
As of match played 22 November 2025

Appearances and goals by club, season, and competition
Club	Season	League			Cup		Continental		Other		Total	
Club	Season	Division	Apps	Goals	Apps	Goals	Apps	Goals	Apps	Goals	Apps	Goals
Dalian Transcendence	2018	China League One	1	0	1	0	–		–		2	0
Shenzhen FC	2022	Chinese Super League	2	0	0	0	–		–		2	0
Shenzhen FC	2023	Chinese Super League	23	0	1	0	–		–		24	0
Shenzhen FC	Total		25	0	1	0	0	0	0	0	26	0
Meizhou Hakka	2024	Chinese Super League	17	0	1	0	–		–		18	0
Meizhou Hakka	2025	Chinese Super League	3	0	1	0	–		–		4	0
Meizhou Hakka	Total		20	0	2	0	0	0	0	0	22	0
Shenzhen Peng City	2025	Chinese Super League	9	1	0	0	–		–		9	1
Career total			55	1	4	0	0	0	0	0	59	1
