= Fan Peipei =

Chinese footballer

Fan Peipei 范培培
Personal information
- Date of birth: 11 January 1985 (age 41)
- Place of birth: Nantong, Jiangsu, China
- Height: 1.72 m (5 ft 7 1/2 in)
- Position: Defender

Youth career
- Jiangsu Sainty

Senior career*
Years	Team	Apps	(Gls)
2005–2009	Jiangsu Sainty	18	(0)
2009–2012	Chengdu Blades	58	(4)
2013–2016	Chongqing Lifan	36	(2)
2017–2018	Dalian Transcendence	26	(1)
2019	Dalian Chanjoy	6	(0)
- * Club domestic league appearances and goals as of 11 October 2019

Fan Peipei (Chinese: 范培培; born 11 January 1985) is a Chinese football player.

== Club career ==
In 2005, Fan Peipei started his professional footballer career with Jiangsu Sainty in the China League One. In July 2009, Fan transferred to Chinese Super League side Chengdu Blades. He would eventually make his league debut for Chengdu on 2 August 2009 in a game against Shaanxi Renhe. In January 2013, Fan transferred to China League One side Chongqing Lifan.

On 21 February 2017, Fan transferred to League One side Dalian Transcendence.

== Club career statistics ==
Statistics accurate as of match played 11 October 2019.

Club performance			League		Cup		League Cup		Continental		Total	
Season	Club	League	Apps	Goals	Apps	Goals	Apps	Goals	Apps	Goals	Apps	Goals
China PR			League		FA Cup		CSL Cup		Asia		Total	
2005	Jiangsu Sainty	China League One	8	0	0	0	-		-		8	0
2006	Jiangsu Sainty	China League One	7	0	0	0	-		-		7	0
2007	Jiangsu Sainty	China League One	2	0	-		-		-		2	0
2008	Jiangsu Sainty	China League One	1	0	-		-		-		1	0
2009	Jiangsu Sainty	Chinese Super League	0	0	-		-		-		0	0
2009	Chengdu Blades	Chinese Super League	7	0	-		-		-		7	0
2010	Chengdu Blades	China League One	15	1	-		-		-		15	1
2011	Chengdu Blades	Chinese Super League	18	1	0	0	-		-		18	1
2012	Chengdu Blades	China League One	18	2	1	0	-		-		19	2
2013	Chongqing Lifan	China League One	21	1	0	0	-		-		21	1
2014	Chongqing Lifan	China League One	14	1	0	0	-		-		14	1
2015	Chongqing Lifan	Chinese Super League	1	0	2	0	-		-		3	0
2016	Chongqing Lifan	Chinese Super League	0	0	1	0	-		-		1	0
2017	Dalian Transcendence	China League One	20	1	1	0	-		-		21	1
2018	Dalian Transcendence	China League One	6	0	1	0	-		-		7	0
2019	Dalian Chanjoy	China League Two	6	0	0	0	-		-		6	0
Total	China PR		144	7	6	0	0	0	0	0	150	7

== Honours ==
=== Club ===
Jiangsu Sainty

- China League One: 2008

Chongqing Lifan

- China League One: 2014
