= Eldar Hasanović =

Bosnian footballer (born 1990)

Personal information
- Full name: Eldar Hasanović
- Date of birth: 12 January 1990 (age 36)
- Place of birth: Sarajevo, SFR Yugoslavia
- Height: 1.89 m (6 ft 2 1/2 in)
- Position: Midfielder

Team information
- Current team: Sitra

Youth career
- –2008: Željezničar

Senior career*
Years	Team	Apps	(Gls)
2008–2010	Žilina	3	(0)
2010–2011	Velež Mostar	7	(4)
2011	Čelik Zenica	13	(1)
2011–2012	Velež Mostar	11	(0)
2012–2015	Željezničar	62	(2)
2015–2016	Bnei Sakhnin	19	(0)
2016–2017	Sloboda Tuzla	15	(0)
2017	Maccabi Sha'arayim	13	(0)
2017–2018	Dalian Transcendence	36	(7)
2019–2020	Radnik Bijeljina	8	(0)
2020	Persita Tangerang	3	(0)
2021	Olimpik	4	(0)
2021–2022	Sloboda Tuzla	6	(0)
2022–	Sitra	0	(0)

International career
2006–2007	Bosnia and Herzegovina U17		
2008–2009	Bosnia and Herzegovina U19	11	(0)
2011	Bosnia and Herzegovina U21	1	(0)
- * Club domestic league appearances and goals as of 16 May 2021

Eldar Hasanović (Bosnian pronunciation: [xasǎːnoʋitɕ]; born 12 January 1990) is a Bosnian professional footballer who plays as a midfielder for Bahraini Premier League club Sitra.

== Club career ==
Hasanović was born in Sarajevo, to a family of Bosnian Muslim origin.

He began his career in the FK Željezničar's youth team. After that, he signed with Slovak club MŠK Žilina and won the championship, but made only one appearance, and left the club at the end of the season, before returning to Bosnia and signed with Velež Mostar.

Hasanović started an impressive season, scoring four goals in the first 7 games of the season, then moved to Čelik Zenica during the season.

In the summer of 2012, he returned to Željezničar and won the league championship in his first season in the club. On 2 November 2014, he scored his debut goal for the club in a 2–1 loss against fierce city rivals FK Sarajevo.

On 1 July 2015, he joined Bnei Sakhnin to compete in the Israeli Premier League.

In September 2016 he joined Sloboda Tuzla.

In January 2017, he returned to Israel and signed with Maccabi Sha'arayim of the National League. In November 2016, he won the 2016–17 Toto Cup Leumit with Sha'arayim.

In June 2017, China League One club Dalian Transcendence signed Hasanović. It is believed to be the choice of his former manager, Rusmir Cviko. He scored an amazing header in his first match. After Dalian got relegated to China League Two (3rd ranked competition in China) in November 2018, Hasanović left the club.

On 23 August 2019, he came back to his home country and signed a one-year contract with Radnik Bijeljina. Hasanović made his official debut for Radnik on 31 August 2019, in a 0–1 away league win against Velež Mostar.

On 14 January 2020, Hasanović left Radnik and signed a contract with Indonesian Liga 1 club Persita Tangerang.

On 20 January 2021, he joined Olimpik.

== International career ==
Hasanović represented Bosnia and Herzegovina on various youth levels. Most notably while playing for the under-19 national team.

== Career statistics ==
=== Club ===
As of match played 16 May 2021.

Appearances and goals by club, season and competition
Club	Season	League	League		Cup		League Cup		Continental		Total	
Club	Season	League	Apps	Goals	Apps	Goals	Apps	Goals	Apps	Goals	Apps	Goals
Žilina	2008–09	Slovak Super Liga	2	0	—		—		0	0	2	0
Žilina	2009–10	Slovak Super Liga	1	0	—		—		0	0	1	0
Žilina	Total		3	0	—		—		0	0	3	0
Velež Mostar	2010–11	Bosnian Premier League	7	4	—		—		—		7	4
Čelik Zenica	2010–11	Bosnian Premier League	11	1	2	0	—		—		13	1
Velež Mostar	2011–12	Bosnian Premier League	11	0	2	1	—		—		13	1
Željezničar	2012–13	Bosnian Premier League	11	0	2	0	—		0	0	13	0
Željezničar	2013–14	Bosnian Premier League	17	0	1	0	—		1	0	19	0
Željezničar	2014–15	Bosnian Premier League	25	2	0	0	—		4	0	29	2
Željezničar	Total		53	2	3	0	—		5	0	61	2
Bnei Sakhnin	2015–16	Israeli Premier League	18	0	3	0	4	0	—		25	0
Bnei Sakhnin	2016–17	Israeli Premier League	0	0	—		—		—		0	0
Bnei Sakhnin	Total		18	0	3	0	4	0	—		25	0
Sloboda Tuzla	2016–17	Bosnian Premier League	6	0	—		—		—		6	0
Maccabi Sha'arayim	2016–17	Liga Leumit	13	0	—		—		—		13	0
Dalian Transcendence	2017	China League One	15	4	0	0	—		—		15	4
Dalian Transcendence	2018	China League One	22	3	0	0	—		—		22	3
Dalian Transcendence	Total		37	7	0	0	—		—		25	0
Radnik Bijeljina	2019–20	Bosnian Premier League	8	0	0	0	—		—		8	0
Persita Tangerang	2020	Liga 1	3	0	0	0	—		—		3	0
Olimpik	2020–21	Bosnian Premier League	4	0	—		—		—		4	0
Career total			174	14	10	1	4	0	5	0	193	15

== Honours ==
Žilina

- Slovak Super Liga: 2009–10

Željezničar

- Bosnian Premier League: 2012–13

Maccabi Sha'arayim

- Toto Cup Leumit: 2016–17
