= Dong Zhiyuan =

Chinese footballer

Dong Zhiyuan 董志远
Personal information
- Full name: Dong Zhiyuan
- Date of birth: 16 March 1989 (age 37)
- Place of birth: Dalian, Liaoning, China
- Height: 1.83 m (6 ft 0 in)
- Position: Forward

Youth career
- 2003–2007: Wuhan Optics Valley

Senior career*
Years	Team	Apps	(Gls)
2008	Wuhan Optics Valley	0	(0)
2009–2011	Hubei Luyin	3	(0)
2012–2015	Xinjiang Tianshan Leopard	83	(12)
2016	Hebei Elite	18	(1)
2017–2018	Dalian Transcendence	49	(4)
2019	Dalian Chanjoy	23	(8)
2020	Guangxi Pingguo Haliao	3	(1)
2022-2023	Dalian LFTZ Huayi		
- * Club domestic league appearances and goals as of 20 May 2022

Dong Zhiyuan (Chinese: 董志远; pinyin: Dǒng Zhìyuǎn; born 16 March 1989) is a former Chinese footballer who played as a forward for Chinese club Dalian LFTZ Huayi.

== Club career ==
Dong joined Wuhan Optics Valley youth team in 2003 and was promoted to the first team squad in 2008. After Wuhan Optics Valley decided to exit 2008 Chinese Super League and disbanded, Dong entered Hubei Luyin.

In 2012, Dong joined newly founded League Two club Hubei China-Kyle (later Xinjiang Tianshan Leopard), and scored a critical goal to help the team gain promotion into League One.

In 2016, China League Two club Hebei Elite signed Dong.

On 13 January 2017, Dalian Transcendence signed a 5 year contract with Dong.

On 28 February 2019, Dong transferred to China League Two side Dalian Chanjoy.

== Career statistics ==
As of 31 December 2020.

Appearances and goals by club, season and competition
Club	Season	League			National Cup		Continental		Other		Total	
Club	Season	Division	Apps	Goals	Apps	Goals	Apps	Goals	Apps	Goals	Apps	Goals
Wuhan Optics Valley	2008	Chinese Super League	0	0	-		-		-		0	0
Hubei Luyin	2009	China League Two	0	0	-		-		-		0	0
Hubei Luyin	2010	China League One	3	0	-		-		-		3	0
Hubei Luyin	2011	China League One	0	0	0	0	-		-		0	0
Hubei Luyin	Total		3	0	0	0	0	0	0	0	3	0
Hubei China-Kyle/ Xinjiang Tianshan Leopard	2012	China League Two	26	4	-		-		-		26	4
Hubei China-Kyle/ Xinjiang Tianshan Leopard	2013	China League One	30	5	0	0	-		-		30	5
Hubei China-Kyle/ Xinjiang Tianshan Leopard	2014	China League One	13	0	1	0	-		-		14	0
Hubei China-Kyle/ Xinjiang Tianshan Leopard	2015	China League One	14	3	2	0	-		-		16	3
Hubei China-Kyle/ Xinjiang Tianshan Leopard	Total		83	12	3	0	0	0	0	0	86	12
Hebei Elite	2016	China League Two	18	1	1	0	-		-		19	1
Dalian Transcendence	2017	China League One	26	3	0	0	-		-		26	3
Dalian Transcendence	2018	China League One	22	1	1	0	-		-		23	1
Dalian Transcendence	Total		48	4	1	0	0	0	0	0	49	4
Dalian Chanjoy	2019	China League Two	23	8	0	0	-		-		23	8
Guangxi Pingguo Haliao	2020	China League Two	3	1	-		-		-		3	1
Career total			178	26	5	0	0	0	0	0	183	26
