= Liu Yuchen (footballer) =

Chinese association football player

Personal information
- Date of birth: 3 January 1989 (age 37)
- Place of birth: Dalian, Liaoning, China
- Height: 1.80 m (5 ft 11 in)
- Position: Left-back

Team information
- Current team: Dalian Zhixing

Senior career*
Years	Team	Apps	(Gls)
- Guangdong Sunray Cave
2014–2019	Dalian Transcendence	45	(1)
2019–2020	Shaoxing Keqiao Yuejia	19	(4)
2020–2022	Jiangxi Beidamen	27	(2)
2022–	Dalian Zhixing	0	(0)
- * Club domestic league appearances and goals as of 14:01, 13 April 2022 (UTC)

Liu Yuchen (Chinese: 刘禹辰; born 3 January 1989) is a Chinese footballer currently playing as a left-back for Dalian Zhixing.

== Career statistics ==
=== Club ===
As of 24 August 2021.

Club	Season	League			Cup		Other		Total	
Club	Season	Division	Apps	Goals	Apps	Goals	Apps	Goals	Apps	Goals
Dalian Transcendence	2014	China League Two	0	0	0	0	0	0	0	0
Dalian Transcendence	2015	China League Two	6	0	2 (Note: Appearances in the Chinese FA Cup)	0	5 (Note: Appearances in the China League Two playoffs)	1	13	1
Dalian Transcendence	2016	China League One	3	0	1	0	0	0	4	0
Dalian Transcendence	2017	China League One	12	0	1	0	0	0	13	0
Dalian Transcendence	2018	China League One	24	1	1	0	0	0	25	1
Dalian Transcendence	Total		45	1	5	0	5	1	55	2
Shaoxing Keqiao Yuejia	2019	China League Two	19	4	2	0	0	0	21	4
Jiangxi Beidamen	2020	China League One	13	1	0	0	2 (Note: Appearances in the China League One relegation playoffs)	0	15	1
Jiangxi Beidamen	2021	China League One	10	0	1	0	0	0	11	0
Jiangxi Beidamen	Total		23	1	1	0	2	0	26	1
Career total			87	6	8	0	7	1	102	7
