= Ötkür Hesen =

Chinese footballer

Ötkür Hesen ئۆتكۈر ھەسەن
Personal information
- Date of birth: 10 April 1993 (age 33)
- Place of birth: Yining, Ili, Xinjiang, China
- Height: 1.76 m (5 ft 9 in)
- Position: Left-back

Youth career
- 2003–2011: Luneng Taishan Football School

Senior career*
Years	Team	Apps	(Gls)
2011	Shandong Youth	14	(0)
2012–2014	Shandong Luneng	1	(0)
2013	→ Shijiazhuang Yongchang (loan)	5	(0)
2014	→ Hebei Zhongji (loan)	24	(0)
2015–2016	Hebei Zhongji	0	(0)
2017	Dalian Transcendence	13	(0)
2018	Yinchuan Helanshan	26	(0)
2019–2022	Sichuan Jiuniu	31	(0)
2020	→ Xi'an UKD F.C. (loan)	9	(0)

International career
2010–2012	China U-20		
- * Club domestic league appearances and goals as of 31 December 2020

Ötkür Hesen (simplified Chinese: 吾提库尔·艾山; traditional Chinese: 吾提庫爾·艾山; pinyin: Wútíkùěr Àishān; Uyghur: ئۆتكۈر ھەسەن; born 10 April 1993 in Yining City, Ili Kazakh Autonomous Prefecture, Xinjiang, China) is a Chinese professional association football player.

== Club career ==
After playing in the youth squad of Shandong Luneng Taishan, Ötkür started his professional football career in 2011. He played for Shandong Youth (Shandong Luneng youth team) in the China League Two and made 14 appearances in the season. Ötkür was promoted to Shandong Luneng's first team squad by Henk ten Cate in 2012. On 19 August 2012, Ötkür made his Super League debut in a 4–2 away defeat against Guangzhou R&F. However, after Shandong Luneng conceding three goals in the first half, he was substituted off by Du Wei in the 46th minute. In January 2014, Ötkür was loaned to China League One side Hebei Zhongji until 31 December 2014. He made a permanent transfer to Hebei Zhongji in 2015. He was sent to the reserved team in 2016.

In February 2017, Ötkür transferred to China League One side Dalian Transcendence.

== International career ==
Ötkür received his first called up for China U-20's squad by Su Maozhen in December 2010. He was appointed as the team captain and continued to play for U-20s in the 2011 Granatkin Memorial, 2011 Toulon Tournament, 2011 Weifang Cup. He made one appearance in the 2012 AFC U-19 Championship qualification (v Macau, 6 November 2011) as China U-20 qualified into the 2012 AFC U-19 Championship.

In March 2011, Ötkür received his first call up for China for the international friendly against Costa Rica. However, he didn't appear in the match.

== Career statistics ==
Statistics accurate as of match played 31 December 2020.

Appearances and goals by club, season and competition
Club	Season	League			National Cup		Continental		Other		Total	
Club	Season	Division	Apps	Goals	Apps	Goals	Apps	Goals	Apps	Goals	Apps	Goals
Shandong Youth	2011	China League Two	14	0	-		-		-		14	0
Shandong Luneng Taishan	2012	Chinese Super League	1	0	0	0	-		-		1	0
Shijiazhuang Yongchang (loan)	2013	China League One	5	0	0	0	-		-		5	0
Hebei Zhongji (loan)	2014	China League One	24	0	0	0	-		-		24	0
Hebei Zhongji	2015	China League One	0	0	0	0	-		-		0	0
Dalian Transcendence	2017	China League One	13	0	0	0	-		-		13	0
Yinchuan Helanshan	2018	China League Two	26	0	3	1	-		-		29	1
Sichuan Jiuniu	2019	China League Two	31	0	3	0	-		-		34	0
Xi'an UKD F.C. (loan)	2020	China League Two	9	0	-		-		-		9	0
Career total			123	0	6	1	0	0	0	0	129	1
