= Ivan Božić (footballer, born 1983) =

Bosnia and Herzegovinian footballer (born 1983)

Personal information
- Date of birth: 19 November 1983 (age 42)
- Place of birth: Sarajevo, SFR Yugoslavia
- Height: 1.86 m (6 ft 1 in)
- Position: Forward

Team information
- Current team: Kustošija (manager)

Youth career
- Zrinjski Mostar

Senior career*
Years	Team	Apps	(Gls)
2000–2002	Harelbeke	0	(0)
2002–2006	Šibenik	79	(28)
2006–2007	Beveren	17	(0)
2007–2008	Rijeka	18	(3)
2008–2011	Šibenik	31	(2)
2012	Hrvatski Dragovoljac	13	(9)
2012	Yanbian Baekdu Tigers	15	(7)
2013	Guizhou Zhicheng	19	(1)
2014	Hrvatski Dragovoljac	9	(4)
2014	Beijing Baxy	14	(4)
2015	Ordabasy	24	(2)
2016	Šibenik	4	(0)
2016–2017	Hrvatski Dragovoljac	20	(7)
2017	Sesvete	0	(0)
2017	Dalian Transcendence	29	(5)
2018	Krško	3	(0)
2018–2019	Fidelis Andria	19	(2)
2019	Hrvatski Dragovoljac	13	(2)
2019–2020	ACD Trasimeno		

Managerial career
- 2025–: Kustošija
- * Club domestic league appearances and goals

Ivan Božić (born 19 November 1983) is a Bosnian-Herzegovinian former professional footballer who played as a forward and now manager; he is currently manager of Kustošija.

== Career ==
Božić was born in Sarajevo and raised in Vareš. He started his career at Zrinjski Mostar of Premier League of Bosnia and Herzegovina. In summer 2000, he moved to Zuid-West-Vlaanderen of Belgian League. He went to Šibenik in summer 2002, due to the merge of Zuid-West-Vlaanderen and K.S.V. Ingelmunster. Božić back to Belgian League in summer 2006 for Beveren, but the relegation he made his Belgian career with another early end. After one season in Rijeka he returned to Šibenik in the Croatian First League.

On 22 July 2014, Božić transferred to China League One side Beijing Baxy.

After three months in Croatia, Božić returned to Italy in December 2019 and signed with ACD Trasimeno.
