= South Lake Sports Center =

Sports venue in Zigong, China

Coordinates: 29°19′35″N 104°46′54″E

- Interactive map of South Lake Sports Center
- Location: Zigong, China
- Capacity: 20,000

Construction
- Opened: August 9, 2010 owner=Sichuan Government tenants=2010 Sichuan Provincial Games

South Lake Sports Center (Chinese: 自贡南湖体育中心) is a multi-purpose stadium in Zigong, China. It is currently used mostly for football matches. The stadium holds 20,000 spectators. It was opened on August 9, 2010. It was used as the main venue for the 2010 Sichuan Provincial Games.
