= Cui Kai (footballer) =

Chinese footballer

Cui Kai 崔凯
Personal information
- Date of birth: 21 January 1987 (age 39)
- Place of birth: Dalian, Liaoning, China
- Height: 1.87 m (6 ft 2 in)
- Position: Goalkeeper

Senior career*
Years	Team	Apps	(Gls)
2005–2012	Liaoning Whowin	17	(0)
2013	Chongqing F.C.	0	(0)
2014	Shenyang Dongjin	10	(0)
2015	Shenyang Urban	-	(-)
2016–2018	Dalian Transcendence	34	(0)
2019	Dalian Chanjoy	10	(0)
2020	Guangxi Pingguo Haliao	4	(0)
- * Club domestic league appearances and goals as of 31 December 2020

Cui Kai (Chinese: 崔凯; born 21 January 1987 in Dalian) is a Chinese footballer.

== Club career ==
Cui Kai started his professional football career in 2005 when he was promoted to Liaoning Whowin's first squad. On 22 September 2007, he made his debut for Liaoning FC in the 2007 Chinese Super League against Shanghai Shenhua. On 23 February 2013, Cui transferred to China League One side Chongqing F.C. on a free transfer. He transferred to Shenyang Dongjin in 2014. On 7 March 2016, Cui signed for China League One side Dalian Transcendence.

On 28 February 2019, Cui transferred to China League Two side Dalian Chanjoy.

== Career statistics ==
Statistics accurate as of match played 31 December 2020.

Appearances and goals by club, season and competition
Club	Season	League			National Cup		Continental		Other		Total	
Club	Season	Division	Apps	Goals	Apps	Goals	Apps	Goals	Apps	Goals	Apps	Goals
Liaoning Whowin	2005	Chinese Super League	0	0	0	0	-		-		0	0
Liaoning Whowin	2006	Chinese Super League	0	0	0	0	-		-		0	0
Liaoning Whowin	2007	Chinese Super League	7	0	-		-		-		7	0
Liaoning Whowin	2008	Chinese Super League	8	0	-		-		-		8	0
Liaoning Whowin	2009	China League One	0	0	-		-		-		0	0
Liaoning Whowin	2010	Chinese Super League	0	0	-		-		-		0	0
Liaoning Whowin	2011	Chinese Super League	2	0	0	0	-		-		2	0
Liaoning Whowin	2012	Chinese Super League	0	0	0	0	-		-		0	0
Liaoning Whowin	Total		17	0	0	0	0	0	0	0	17	0
Chongqing F.C.	2013	China League One	0	0	1	0	-		-		1	0
Shenyang Dongjin	2014	China League Two	10	0	2	0	-		-		12	0
Shenyang Urban	2015	CAL	-		-		-		-		-	
Dalian Transcendence	2016	China League One	5	0	1	0	-		-		6	0
Dalian Transcendence	2017	China League One	27	0	0	0	-		-		27	0
Dalian Transcendence	2018	China League One	4	0	1	0	-		-		5	0
Dalian Transcendence	Total		36	0	2	0	0	0	0	0	38	0
Dalian Chanjoy	2019	China League Two	10	0	1	0	-		-		11	0
Guangxi Pingguo Haliao	2020	China League Two	4	0	-		-		-		4	0
Career total			77	0	6	0	0	0	0	0	83	0

== Honours ==
=== Club ===
Liaoning Whowin

- China League One: 2009
