= Guo Liang (footballer) =

Chinese footballer

Guo Liang 郭亮
Personal information
- Full name: Guo Liang
- Date of birth: 20 March 1985 (age 41)
- Place of birth: Dalian, Liaoning, China
- Height: 1.75 m (5 ft 9 in)
- Position: Left-back

Youth career
- Dalian Shide

Senior career*
Years	Team	Apps	(Gls)
2002–2006	Dalian Shide	13	(0)
2006	→ Guangzhou GPC (loan)	11	(0)
2007	Harbin Yiteng	6	(0)
2008–2016	Qingdao Jonoon	235	(1)
2017	Changchun Yatai	5	(0)
2018	Dalian Boyoung	22	(0)
- * Club domestic league appearances and goals as of 11 October 2018

Guo Liang (Chinese: 郭亮; pinyin: Guō Liàng; born 20 March 1985 in Dalian, Liaoning) is a Chinese former professional footballer.

== Club career ==
Guo started his professional football career in 2002 when he was promoted to Dalian Shide's first squad. He played as a substitute player for Adilson and made just 13 league appearances for Dalian between 2002 and 2005. He was loaned to China League One side Guangzhou Pharmaceutical in 2006. Guo transferred to another League One club Harbin Yiteng in December 2006 and left in June 2007. He moved to Chinese Super League club Qingdao Jonoon in January 2008. On 5 January 2017, Guo transferred to Chinese Super League side Changchun Yatai.

In March 2018, Guo transferred to his hometown club Dalian Boyoung in the China League Two.
