= Wang Jun (footballer, born July 1990) =

Chinese footballer

Wang Jun 王军
Personal information
- Full name: Wang Jun
- Date of birth: 1 July 1990 (age 36)
- Place of birth: Guiyang, Guizhou, China
- Height: 1.75 m (5 ft 9 in)
- Position: Midfielder

Youth career
- 2003–2007: Jiangsu Sainty
- 2009–2013: Nanjing University

Senior career*
Years	Team	Apps	(Gls)
2008	Jiangsu Sainty	0	(0)
2014–2020	Guizhou Zhicheng	72	(5)
- * Club domestic league appearances and goals as of 31 December 2020

Wang Jun (Chinese: 王军; born 1 July 1990) is a Chinese footballer who plays for as a left-footed midfielder.

== Club career ==
Wang Jun started his professional football career in 2008 when he was promoted to Jiangsu Sainty's first team squad. After a stellar 2008 season, he entered Nanjing University. In 2014, Wang joined his hometown club Guizhou Zhicheng. He was the key player of Guizhou to promoted back to China League One in 2014 season and promotion to Chinese Super League in 2016 season. He made his Super League debut on 8 April 2017 in a 0–0 home draw against Tianjin Teda, coming on as a substitute for Chang Feiya in the 77th minute.

== Career statistics ==
As of 31 December 2020.

Appearances and goals by club, season and competition
Club	Season	League			National Cup		Continental		Other		Total	
Club	Season	Division	Apps	Goals	Apps	Goals	Apps	Goals	Apps	Goals	Apps	Goals
Jiangsu Sainty	2008	China League One	0	0	-		-		-		0	0
Guizhou Zhicheng	2014	China League Two	7	1	0	0	-		-		7	1
Guizhou Zhicheng	2015	China League One	24	3	2	0	-		-		26	3
Guizhou Zhicheng	2016	China League One	26	1	0	0	-		-		26	1
Guizhou Zhicheng	2017	Chinese Super League	7	0	0	0	-		-		7	0
Guizhou Zhicheng	2018	Chinese Super League	6	0	0	0	-		-		6	0
Guizhou Zhicheng	2019	China League One	2	0	1	0	-		-		3	0
Guizhou Zhicheng	2020	China League One	0	0	0	0	-		-		0	0
Guizhou Zhicheng	Total		72	5	3	0	0	0	0	0	75	5
Career total			72	5	3	0	0	0	0	0	75	5
