= Zhang Jian (footballer) =

Chinese footballer

Zhang Jian 张健
Personal information
- Full name: Zhang Jian
- Date of birth: 28 February 1989 (age 37)
- Place of birth: Chongqing, Sichuan, China
- Height: 1.72 m (5 ft 8 in)
- Position: Midfielder

Senior career*
| Years | Team | Apps | (Gls) |
| 2006–2011 | Chongqing Lifan | 58 | (7) |
| 2012–2014 | Beijing Guoan | 1 | (0) |
| 2013 | → Hebei Zhongji (loan) | 10 | (1) |
| 2015 | Wuhan Zall | 10 | (0) |
| 2016–2018 | Dalian Transcendence | 76 | (3) |
| 2019 | Jiangxi Liansheng | 11 | (0) |
| 2020 | Shanxi Longjin | 9 | (0) |
| 2021–2023 | Shanxi Longchengren | | |

International career
| 2007-2008 | China U19 | | |
- * Club domestic league appearances and goals as of 31 December 2020

Zhang Jian (Chinese: 张健; born 28 February 1989) is a Chinese former footballer.

== Club career ==
Zhang Jian started his professional football career in 2006 when he joined Chongqing Lifan for the 2006 Chinese Super League campaign.

On 15 December 2011, Zhang transferred to Chinese Super League side Beijing Guoan. In July 2013, Zhang was loaned to China League Two side Hebei Zhongji until 31 December 2013.

On 16 July 2015, Zhang transferred to China League One side Wuhan Zall.

On 22 January 2016, Zhang transferred to fellow China League One side Dalian Transcendence.

== Career statistics ==
Statistics accurate as of match played 31 December 2020.

Appearances and goals by club, season and competition
| Club | Season | League | | | National Cup | | Continental | | Other | | Total | |
| Club | Season | Division | Apps | Goals | Apps | Goals | Apps | Goals | Apps | Goals | Apps | Goals |
|---|---|---|---|---|---|---|---|---|---|---|---|---|
| Chongqing Lifan | 2006 | Chinese Super League | 9 | 0 | 0 | 0 | - | | - | | 9 | 0 |
| Chongqing Lifan | 2007 | China League One | 2 | 0 | - | | - | | - | | 2 | 0 |
| Chongqing Lifan | 2008 | China League One | 3 | 0 | - | | - | | - | | 3 | 0 |
| Chongqing Lifan | 2009 | Chinese Super League | 4 | 1 | - | | - | | - | | 4 | 1 |
| Chongqing Lifan | 2010 | Chinese Super League | 20 | 3 | - | | - | | - | | 20 | 3 |
| Chongqing Lifan | 2011 | China League One | 20 | 3 | 0 | 0 | - | | - | | 20 | 3 |
| Chongqing Lifan | Total | | 58 | 7 | 0 | 0 | 0 | 0 | 0 | 0 | 58 | 7 |
| Beijing Guoan | 2012 | Chinese Super League | 1 | 0 | 0 | 0 | 0 | 0 | - | | 1 | 0 |
| Beijing Guoan | 2013 | Chinese Super League | 0 | 0 | 0 | 0 | 0 | 0 | - | | 0 | 0 |
| Beijing Guoan | 2014 | Chinese Super League | 0 | 0 | 0 | 0 | 0 | 0 | - | | 0 | 0 |
| Beijing Guoan | Total | | 1 | 0 | 0 | 0 | 0 | 0 | 0 | 0 | 1 | 0 |
| Hebei Zhongji (loan) | 2013 | China League Two | 10 | 1 | 0 | 0 | - | | - | | 10 | 1 |
| Wuhan Zall | 2015 | China League One | 10 | 0 | 0 | 0 | - | | - | | 10 | 0 |
| Dalian Transcendence | 2016 | China League One | 29 | 2 | 0 | 0 | - | | - | | 29 | 0 |
| Dalian Transcendence | 2017 | China League One | 28 | 1 | 0 | 0 | - | | - | | 28 | 1 |
| Dalian Transcendence | 2018 | China League One | 19 | 0 | 0 | 0 | - | | - | | 19 | 0 |
| Dalian Transcendence | Total | | 76 | 3 | 0 | 0 | 0 | 0 | 0 | 0 | 76 | 3 |
| Jiangxi Liansheng | 2019 | China League Two | 11 | 0 | 0 | 0 | - | | - | | 11 | 0 |
| Shanxi Longjin | 2020 | China League Two | 9 | 0 | - | | - | | - | | 9 | 0 |
| Total | | | 175 | 11 | 0 | 0 | 0 | 0 | 0 | 0 | 175 | 11 |
