= Zhao Yibo =

Chinese association football player

Personal information
- Date of birth: 14 November 1988 (age 37)
- Place of birth: Anshan, Liaoning, China
- Height: 1.82 m (6 ft 0 in)
- Position: Defender

Team information
- Current team: Dalian Jinshiwan

Senior career*
Years	Team	Apps	(Gls)
2012–2014	Shenyang Zhongze	2	(0)
2015–2018	Dalian Transcendence	93	(0)
2019–2020	Guangdong South China Tiger	22	(0)
2020–2021	Jiangxi Beidamen	38	(1)
2022-	Dalian Jinshiwan	0	(0)
- * Club domestic league appearances and goals as of 14:01, 15 May 2022 (UTC)

Zhao Yibo (Chinese: 赵一博; born 14 November 1988) is a Chinese footballer currently playing as a defender for Chinese club Dalian Jinshiwan.

== Career statistics ==
=== Club ===
As of 24 August 2021.

Club	Season	League			Cup		Other		Total	
Club	Season	Division	Apps	Goals	Apps	Goals	Apps	Goals	Apps	Goals
Shenyang Zhongze	2012	China League One	0	0	1 (Note: Appearances in the Chinese FA Cup)	0	0	0	1	0
Shenyang Zhongze	2013	China League One	0	0	1	0	0	0	1	0
Shenyang Zhongze	2014	China League One	2	0	0	0	0	0	2	0
Shenyang Zhongze	Total		2	0	2	0	0	0	4	0
Dalian Transcendence	2015	China League Two	7	0	2	0	5 (Note: Appearances in the China League Two playoffs)	0	14	0
Dalian Transcendence	2016	China League One	25	0	1	0	0	0	26	0
Dalian Transcendence	2017	China League One	28	0	0	0	0	0	28	0
Dalian Transcendence	2018	China League One	28	0	0	0	0	0	28	0
Dalian Transcendence	Total		88	0	3	0	5	0	96	0
Guangdong South China Tiger	2019	China League One	22	0	0	0	0	0	22	0
Jiangxi Beidamen	2020	China League One	11	0	0	0	2 (Note: Appearances in the China League One relegation playoffs)	0	13	0
Jiangxi Beidamen	2021	China League One	14	1	0	0	0	0	14	1
Jiangxi Beidamen	Total		25	1	0	0	2	0	27	1
Career total			137	1	5	0	7	0	149	1
