= Quan Heng =

Chinese footballer

Quan Heng 权恒
Personal information
- Date of birth: 30 September 1989 (age 37)
- Place of birth: Dalian, Liaoning, China
- Height: 1.78 m (5 ft 10 in)
- Position: Midfielder

Youth career
- 2003–2007: Dalian Shide

Senior career*
Years	Team	Apps	(Gls)
2008	Dalian Shide Singapore	25	(2)
2009	Dalian Shide	0	(0)
2010	Shenzhen Ruby	25	(2)
2011–2014	Dalian Aerbin	16	(4)
2015–2018	Dalian Transcendence	70	(11)
2019–2021	Liaoning Shenyang Urban	31	(4)
2021	Zibo Cuju	6	(0)
2022	Dandong Tengyue	10	(1)

Managerial career
- 2024–2025: Yanbian Longding （assistant)
- * Club domestic league appearances and goals as of 27 April 2022

Quan Heng (Chinese: 权恒; born 30 September 1989 in Dalian) is a Chinese former football player.

== Club career ==
Quan Heng would start his football career playing for the various Dalian Shide youth teams before he was loaned out to the team's youth team called Dalian Shide Siwu FC that was allowed to take part in Singapore's 2008 S.League. Upon his return to Dalian Shide at the beginning of the 2009 Chinese Super League. In February 2010, Quan transferred to Chinese Super League side Shenzhen Ruby. He would eventually make his league debut for Shenzhen on 28 May 2010 in a game against Jiangsu Sainty, coming on as a substitute for Huang Fengtao in the 77th minute. In May 2011, Quan transferred to China League One side Dalian Aerbin.

On 31 December 2014, Quan transferred to China League Two side Dalian Transcendence.

In March 2019, Quan transferred to China League Two side Shenyang Urban. He would go on to win the 2019 China League Two division with the club.

== Career statistics ==
Statistics accurate as of match played 31 December 2020.

Club	Season	League			National Cup		League Cup		Continental		Total	
Club	Season	Division	Apps	Goals	Apps	Goals	Apps	Goals	Apps	Goals	Apps	Goals
Dalian Shide Singapore	2008	S. League	25	2	0	0	0	0	-		25	2
Dalian Shide	2009	Chinese Super League	0	0	-		-		-		0	0
Shenzhen Ruby	2010	Chinese Super League	25	2	-		-		-		25	2
Dalian Aerbin	2011	China League One	14	4	2	0	-		-		16	4
Dalian Aerbin	2012	Chinese Super League	1	0	1	0	-		-		2	0
Dalian Aerbin	2013	Chinese Super League	0	0	0	0	-		-		0	0
Dalian Aerbin	2014	Chinese Super League	1	0	0	0	-		-		1	0
Dalian Aerbin	Total		16	4	3	0	0	0	0	0	19	4
Dalian Transcendence	2015	China League Two	18	7	2	2	-		-		20	9
Dalian Transcendence	2016	China League One	15	2	0	0	-		-		15	2
Dalian Transcendence	2017	China League One	13	1	0	0	-		-		13	1
Dalian Transcendence	2018	China League One	24	1	0	0	-		-		24	1
Dalian Transcendence	Total		70	11	2	2	0	0	0	0	72	13
Shenyang Urban	2019	China League Two	20	4	1	0	-		-		21	4
Shenyang Urban	2020	China League One	10	0	-		-		-		10	0
Shenyang Urban	Total		30	4	1	0	0	0	0	0	31	4
Career total			166	23	6	0	0	0	0	0	172	25

== Honours ==
=== Club ===
Dalian Aerbin

- China League One: 2011

Shenyang Urban

- China League Two: 2019
