= Wang Hongyou =

Chinese footballer

Wang Hongyou 王宏有
Personal information
- Full name: Wang Hongyou
- Date of birth: 23 January 1985 (age 41)
- Place of birth: Dalian, China
- Height: 1.88 m (6 ft 2 in)
- Positions: Centre-back; left-back

Team information
- Current team: Zhejiang Greentown
- Number: 33

Youth career
- 2003–2004: Zhejiang Greentown

Senior career*
Years	Team	Apps	(Gls)
2005–2010	Zhejiang Greentown	80	(2)
2011–2012	Dalian Aerbin	38	(2)
2013–2015	Hangzhou Greentown	14	(0)
2014	→ Dalian Transcendence (loan)	7	(0)
2016–2018	Dalian Transcendence	76	(9)
2019–	Zhejiang Greentown	28	(1)
- * Club domestic league appearances and goals as of 31 December 2020

Wang Hongyou (Chinese: 王宏有; born 23 January 1985) is a Chinese footballer who plays for Zhejiang Greentown in the China League One.

== Club career ==
Wang Hongyou would start is professional career with Zhejiang Greentown in the 2005 league season when he was promoted to their senior team. In the following season he would gain significantly more playing time and was part of the squad that won promotion to the top tier. He would go on to become a vital member of the team and help establish the club in the league until on 5 September 2009 in a league game against Shenzhen FC he was red carded in a 2-1 defeat for violent conduct towards the referee. While he would argue that all he did was pass the ball towards the referee and not throw it at him his behaviour after the sending off where he threw his boots at the referee saw him receive a four match ban and a fine of 20,000 Yuan by the Chinese Football Association.

On 17 January 2010 while out with his girlfriend in a taxi he got into an altercation with the driver. Wang believed the driver was going the wrong way and subsequently hit him on the face. After the incident Wang was detained and bailed out for 25,000 Yuan while at his club he was ordered to leave the team. Hoping to revive his career and get a fresh start Wang moved to second tier club Dalian Aerbin in the 2011 league season. The move would turn out to be a success and he went on to win the division title with them.

On 4 March 2016 Wang joined China League One club Dalian Transcendence and was named as their captain at the start of the season.

On 30 January 2019, Wang returned to Zhejiang Greentown.

== Career statistics ==
Statistics accurate as of match played 31 December 2020.

Appearances and goals by club, season and competition
Club	Season	League			National Cup		Continental		Other		Total	
Club	Season	Division	Apps	Goals	Apps	Goals	Apps	Goals	Apps	Goals	Apps	Goals
Zhejiang Greentown	2005	China League One	0	0	0	0	-		-		0	0
Zhejiang Greentown	2006	China League One	18	1	-		-		-		18	1
Zhejiang Greentown	2007	Chinese Super League	21	0	-		-		-		21	0
Zhejiang Greentown	2008	Chinese Super League	22	0	-		-		-		22	0
Zhejiang Greentown	2009	Chinese Super League	18	1	-		-		-		18	1
Zhejiang Greentown	2010	Chinese Super League	1	0	-		-		-		1	0
Zhejiang Greentown	Total		80	2	0	0	0	0	0	0	80	2
Dalian Aerbin	2011	China League One	21	1	0	0	-		-		21	1
Dalian Aerbin	2012	Chinese Super League	17	1	0	0	-		-		17	1
Dalian Aerbin	Total		38	2	0	0	0	0	0	0	38	2
Hangzhou Greentown	2013	Chinese Super League	14	0	1	0	-		-		15	0
Hangzhou Greentown	2015	Chinese Super League	0	0	0	0	-		-		0	0
Hangzhou Greentown	Total		14	0	1	0	0	0	0	0	15	0
Dalian Transcendence (loan)	2014	China League Two	7	0	0	0	-		-		7	0
Dalian Transcendence	2016	China League One	21	0	0	0	-		-		21	0
Dalian Transcendence	2017	China League One	28	7	0	0	-		-		28	7
Dalian Transcendence	2018	China League One	27	2	0	0	-		-		27	2
Dalian Transcendence	Total		76	9	0	0	0	0	0	0	76	9
Zhejiang Greentown	2019	China League One	28	1	0	0	-		-		28	1
Total			243	14	1	0	0	0	0	0	244	14

== Honours ==
=== Club ===
Dalian Aerbin

- China League One: 2011
