= Rusmir Cviko =

Bosnian footballer and manager

Personal information
- Full name: Rusmir Cviko
- Date of birth: 2 January 1972 (age 54)
- Place of birth: Sarajevo, SR Bosnia, SFR Yugoslavia
- Position: Midfielder

Senior career*
Years	Team	Apps	(Gls)
1992	FK Sarajevo	0	(0)
1993	Sarajevo	1	(0)
1995–1997	Royal Antwerp	0	(0)
1997–1998	Željezničar	28	(2)
1999–2000	Čelik Zenica	27	(3)
2000	Al Wahda		
Total		55	(5)

Managerial career
- 2004–2008: Bosnia and Herzegovina (youth coach)
- 2007–2009: Bosnia and Herzegovina U21 (coach)
- 2008–2009: Bosnia and Herzegovina (scout)
- 2009–2013: Željezničar (team manager)
- 2014–2015: Bosnia and Herzegovina (scout)
- 2016–2017: Dalian Transcendence
- 2017–2018: Meizhou Hakka
- 2020: Bosnia and Herzegovina (assistant)
- 2022–2023: Al-Arabi SC
- 2023–2024: Al-Orobah
- 2024: Raja CA
- 2025: Kazma
- 2025: CS Constantine
- 2025–2026: Al Wehda
- * Club domestic league appearances and goals

Rusmir Cviko (born 2 January 1972) is a Bosnian professional football manager who was most recently the head coach of Saudi club Al Wehda and former player.

Cviko is a former player of the Bosnia and Herzegovina national football team and coach of numerous national teams of Bosnia and Herzegovina.

== Club career ==
Cviko started his youth playing career at Sarajevo. After finishing his youth career, he played for the senior team of Sarajevo 1993. In 1995, he moved to Belgian First Division A club Royal Antwerp where he played until 1997 but did not feature in any league game.

In 1997, Cviko came back to Bosnia and Herzegovina, and moved to First League of Bosnia and Herzegovina club Željezničar, where he won the league title in the 1997–98 season and the Bosnian Supercup in 1998. In 1999, Cviko moved to Čelik Zenica, before ending his career at UAE Pro-League club Al Wahda in 2000.

== International career ==
Between 1993 and 1996, Cviko played for the Bosnia and Herzegovina national team. During his youth national team playing career Cviko played for the U15, U17 and U19 national teams of Bosnia and Herzegovina.

== Managerial career ==
=== Bosnia and Herzegovina national teams ===
From 2004 until 2008, Cviko was a youth National Team coach in the FA of Bosnia and Herzegovina. In 2007, he became one of the coaches of the U21 National Team of Bosnia and Herzegovina. He remained in that position until 2009.

During his tenure at the Bosnian FA, he also served as the head scout of the A National Team of Bosnia and Herzegovina. In 2014, Cviko held the position of coach and scout with the youth National Team in the FA.

=== Željezničar (team manager) ===
In 2009, Cviko accepted the position of team manager at the Bosnian powerhouse Željezničar on suggestion of club manager at the time Amar Osim. During Cviko's tenure as team manager, the Željezničar team coached by Osim had much success. The club was crowned Champions in the seasons 2009–10, 2011–12 and 2012–13.

Željezničar also won 2 Bosnian cup titles in the 2010–11 and 2011–12 seasons. In the 2009–10 and the 2012–13 seasons, the club was the runner-up in the National Cup competition. Cviko finished his tenure at the club after leaving in June 2013.

=== Dalian Transcendence ===
On 21 April 2016, Cviko began to work as the manager of Dalian Transcendence. In August 2016, Cviko was named interim-manager of the team, and he successfully saved the team from relegation.

On 18 December 2016, Dalian Transcendence officially signed Cviko as their manager. He took the club over when it was in danger of relegation and kept it in China League One. In the next season, Cviko ended his time at Dalian Transcendence and upon his departure the club was in 9th position. He completed his tenure at Dalian in December 2017.

=== Meizhou Hakka ===
Cviko's great reputation and great work in Dalian Transcendence did not go unnoticed and on 16 December 2017, he became the new manager of China League One club Meizhou Hakka F.C. Cviko took the team into the new season in January 2018. In the 2018 China League One season, he managed to get the club to its highest position in history. In April 2018, he was declared as the Coach of the Month in the China League One.

Only in April 2018, Meizhou Hakka won 5 games in China League One which was hailed as a phenomenal success as the club's goal at the beginning of the season was to avoid relegation. The club's league position lead it in the next season to the China Super League and that had attracted a lot of attention from some Chinese Super League clubs for Cviko.

He resigned from the position of Meizhou Hakka manager on 28 August 2018, but left the club at friendly terms with its management. While at Hakka, Cviko once again proved what a great hire he was for the club. When he took over the team in December 2017, the club's first team was ranked 13th out of 16 teams in the China League One based on team value. At the time of Cviko's departure the team was ranked 3rd out of 16 teams. This was due to the team's great results throughout the season and the fact that during Cviko's tenure at the club, the team spent most of its time ranked somewhere between the 1st and 3rd place in the China League One rankings.

Cviko also broke some records as well while at the club. The team was unbeaten for 11 games in a row on its home field and won 5 in a row which is the club's best result in history.

=== Return to Bosnia and Herzegovina national team ===
On 25 January 2020, Cviko returned to the Bosnia and Herzegovina national team, being named as an assistant of head coach Dušan Bajević.

=== Al-Orobah ===
On 20 June 2023, Cviko was appointed as manager of Saudi Arabian club Al-Orobah. He led the club to promotion to the Pro League in his only season at the club.

=== Raja CA ===
On 25 July 2024, he signed a one-year deal with Raja CA to become its head coach. The club has just won the double with its predecessor Josef Zinnbauer. On 27 September 2024, he was sacked.

== Managerial statistics ==
As of match played 30 June 2026

Managerial record by team and tenure
Team	Nat	From	To	Record							
Team	Nat	From	To	G	W	D	L	GF	GA	GD	Win %
Dalian Transcendence	(China)	12 August 2016	10 August 2017	29	10	6	13	35	52	−17	34.48
Meizhou Hakka	(China)	17 December 2017	29 August 2018	22	9	5	8	31	30	+1	40.91
Al-Arabi SC	(Kuwait)	22 September 2022	15 June 2023	36	23	7	6	72	38	+34	63.89
Al-Orobah	(Saudi Arabia)	22 June 2023	1 June 2024	35	20	4	11	48	35	+13	57.14
Raja CA	(Morocco)	25 July 2024	26 September 2024	8	3	2	3	14	11	+3	37.50
Kazma	(Kuwait)	25 January 2025	30 May 2025	13	4	4	5	21	18	+3	30.77
CS Constantine	(Algeria)	1 July 2025	6 December 2025	12	5	3	4	17	12	+5	41.67
Al-Wehda	(Saudi Arabia)	15 December 2025	30 June 2026	23	10	4	9	37	28	+9	43.48
Total				178	84	35	59	275	224	+51	47.19

== Honours ==
=== Player ===
Željezničar

- First League of Bosnia and Herzegovina: 1997–98
- Bosnian Supercup: 1998

=== Manager ===
Al-Arabi

- Kuwait Crown Prince Cup: 2022–23

Individual

- China League One Manager of the Month: April 2018
