= Jinzhou Stadium =

Sports venue in Dalian, China

Dalian Jinzhou Stadium 大连金州体育场
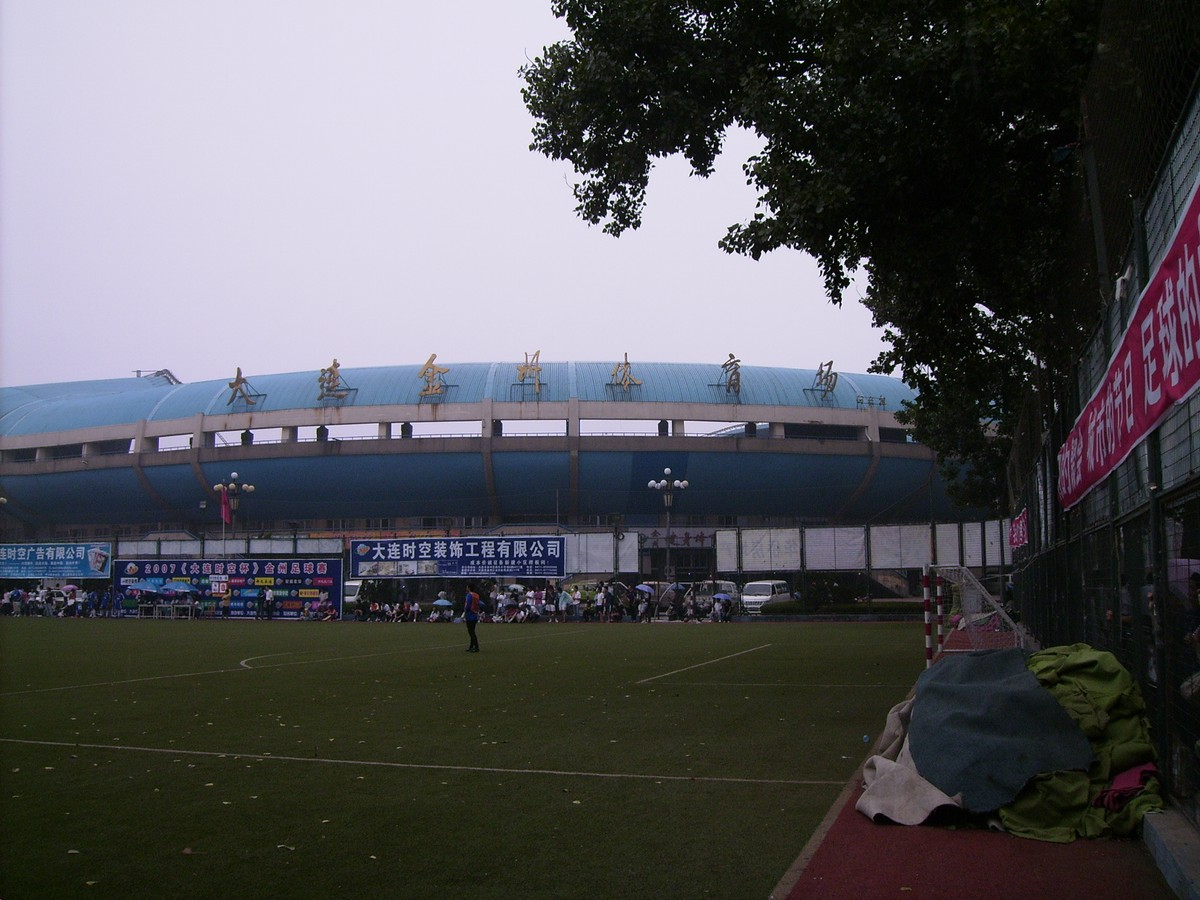
- Interactive map of Dalian Jinzhou Stadium 大连金州体育场
- Full name: Dalian Jinzhou Stadium
- Location: Dalian, Liaoning, China
- Coordinates: 39°05′42.9″N 121°43′08.8″E
- Capacity: 30,776

Construction
- Groundbreaking: 1996
- Opened: 1997
- Renovated: 2007, 2020

Tenants
- Dalian Shide (1995–1999, 2004–2012); Dalian Aerbin (2012–2013); Dalian Transcendence (2014–2018); Dalian Chanjoy (2016-2019); Shanghai Shenhua (2022); Dalian Zhixing F.C. (2023); Dalian K'un City F.C. (2024–present)

The Jinzhou Stadium (Chinese: 金州体育场) is a multi-purpose stadium in Jinzhou District, Dalian, Liaoning, China. Currently it is mostly used for football matches. The stadium holds 30,776 people and was built in 1997. It is most famous for holding the 1998 FIFA World Cup qualification for China.

== History ==
The original Jinzhou Stadium was built in 1958, with a capacity of 12,000. In 1996, the government of Dalian decided to demolish the old stadium, and rebuild the Jinzhou Stadium at the same location. The construction was finished in 1998. Between 1995 and 2019, the stadium served as the home stadium for multiple teams. Notable tenants are Dalian Shide (previously known as Dalian Wanda). In 2005, Dalian Shide decided to move out from Dalian People's Stadium, and selected Jinzhou Stadium as their fixed home stadium.

The stadium is most famous as the home stadium of China national football team in the 1998 FIFA World Cup qualification, where crowds witnessed China's regretful loss to Qatar.

On the other hand, the stadium used to receive negative reception for its poor maintenance. Due to its soft, uneven grass pitch and poor drainage, it was frequently called "vegetable patch". The condition was greatly improved in 2020 when it received a renovation worth ¥4 million, as Dalian would hold the 2020 Chinese Super League Group A.

== Notable Events ==
- 1995–1999: One of the home stadiums of Dalian Wanda.
- 1997: 1998 FIFA World Cup qualification (AFC), as the home stadium for China in the second round.
- 1999: Home stadium of Liaoning.
- 2004: Home stadium of Dalian Changbo.
- 2005–2012: Home stadium of Dalian Shide.
- 2012–2013: Home stadium of Dalian Aerbin.
- 2014–2018: Home stadium of Dalian Transcendence.
- 2016–2019: Home stadium of Dalian Chanjoy.
- 2020: Hosting stadium of the 2020 Chinese Super League Group A.
- 2022: Temporary home stadium of Shanghai Shenhua.
