= Dalian Chanjoy F.C. =

Chinese football club

Dalian Chanjoy Dàlián Qiānzhào 大连千兆
- Full name: Dalian Chanjoy Football Club 大连千兆足球俱乐部
- Founded: 20 August 2015; 10 years ago
- Dissolved: 4 February 2020; 5 years ago
- Ground: Jinzhou Stadium, Dalian
- Capacity: 30,777
- Owner: Dalian Boyoung Construction Engineering Co., Ltd.
- Chairman: Lü Feng
- League: China League Two
- 2019: League Two, 12th

Dalian Chanjoy Football Club (Chinese: 大连千兆足球俱乐部) was a professional football club based in Dalian, Liaoning, China.

== History ==
Dalian Boyang F.C. was established on 20 August 2015, by Dalian Boyoung Construction Engineering Co., Ltd.. They bought the first team of Dalian Longjuanfeng and played in the 2016 China Amateur Football League, and ended up winning the entire championship by beating Shaanxi Chang'an Athletic in the penalty shoot-out in the final and won promotion to 2017 China League Two. The club changed their English name to Dalian Boyoung in the 2017 season, and Dalian Chanjoy in the 2019 season. The club was disbanded in February 2020.

== Name history ==
- 2015–2016 Dalian Boyang F.C. 大连博阳
- 2017–2018 Dalian Boyoung F.C. 大连博阳
- 2019–2020 Dalian Chanjoy F.C. 大连千兆

== Managerial history ==
- (China) Chen Bo (2016–2017)
- (China) Jiang Feng (2017–2018)
- (Bosnia and Herzegovina) Dželaludin Muharemović (2019)
- (China) Zhao Faqing (2019)

== Results ==
All-time league rankings

As of the end of 2019 season.

Year	Div	Pld	W	D	L	GF	GA	GD	Pts	Pos.	FA Cup	Super Cup	AFC	Att./G	Stadium
2016	4									W	R3	DNQ	DNQ		
2017	3	24	6	8	10	26	31	-5	26	17	R2	DNQ	DNQ	502	Jinzhou Stadium
2018	3	28	14	4	10	40	30	10	46	17	R4	DNQ	DNQ	411	Jinzhou Stadium
2019	3	30	13	6	11	63	45	18	45^{1}	12	R2	DNQ	DNQ		Jinzhou Stadium

- ^1 In group stage.

Key

	China top division
	China second division
	China third division
	China fourth division
W	Winners
RU	Runners-up
3	Third place
	Relegated

- Pld = Played
- W = Games won
- D = Games drawn
- L = Games lost
- F = Goals for
- A = Goals against
- Pts = Points
- Pos = Final position
- DNQ = Did not qualify
- DNE = Did not enter
- NH = Not Held
- – = Does Not Exist
- R1 = Round 1
- R2 = Round 2
- R3 = Round 3
- R4 = Round 4
- F = Final
- SF = Semi-finals
- QF = Quarter-finals
- R16 = Round of 16
- Group = Group stage
- GS2 = Second Group stage
- QR1 = First Qualifying Round
- QR2 = Second Qualifying Round
- QR3 = Third Qualifying Round

== Honours ==
- China Amateur Football League
  - Champions (1): 2016
