= Dalian Transcendence F.C. =

Defunct association football club in China

Dalian Transcendence Dàlián Chāoyuè 大连超越
- Full name: Dalian Transcendence Football Club 大连超越足球俱乐部
- Founded: 18 November 2013; 12 years ago
- Dissolved: 14 January 2019; 7 years ago
- Ground: Jinzhou Stadium, Dalian
- Capacity: 30,776
- 2018: League One, 15th (relegated)
Home colours	Away colours

Dalian Transcendence Football Club (Chinese: 大连超越足球俱乐部) was a Chinese football club based in Dalian, Liaoning. Founded in 2013, the club played in the Chinese professional league between 2014 and 2018. They quit from the professional league and turn as amateur in January 2019 when failing to apply professional league license.

== History ==
Dalian Transcendence F.C. was established on 18 November 2013 by Zhao Yang (赵阳) with a registered capital of 3 million Yuan to participate in the third tier of Chinese football at the beginning of the 2014 China League Two season. As a publicly listed football club Zhao Yang would proclaim that this model had already seen investment reach 10 million Yuan and he would be reinvesting that money on educating the team's youth system. Liu Zhongchang was brought in as the club's manager while the club's recruitment policy saw them actively bring in recently defunct Dalian Shide F.C. players, which included Han Jiabao, Hao Xingchen, Hu Zhaojun, Nan Yunqi, and Yan Song. With the club choosing the same blue home jersey colours and using the same home ground of Jinzhou Stadium it saw many within the Chinese media to believe that Dalian Transcendence were actively claiming to be the successor to Dalian Shide, Zhao Yang proclaimed to be neutral on the matter.

The club's first competitive game would be on 30 March 2014 against Guangxi Liuzhou Liuyue in the first round of the 2014 Chinese FA Cup where they won their game 3–0 at home. The club's debut appearance within the league saw them come third within the league's group stages, however within the knock-out phase they were eliminated by Guizhou Zhicheng F.C. on away goals. The following season the club would reach the divisions Play-off final where they lost the tie to Meizhou Kejia F.C. on penalties, however despite coming runners-up they still gained promotion to the second tier.

In July 2018, the team signed naming sponsorship for the first time in club history, with local car dealer Dalian Huifeng, to compete as Dalian Huifeng Automobile Plaza (Chinese: 大连慧丰汽车广场队) for the rest of the 2018 season.

On January 13, 2019, after their relegation in the 2018 season, Transcendence lost their license to compete in the 2019 China League Two, as they failed to sign the salary confirmation files. The club announced they decided to quit from the professional league and turn as amateur one day later.

== Retired numbers ==
17 – (China) Wang Renlong, Forward, 2014 posthumous. The number was retired in November 2014.

== Managerial history ==
- (China) Liu Zhongchang (2014 – 13 April 2016)
- (China) Sun Feng (caretaker) (15 April 2016 – 21 April 2016)
- (Slovenia) Ermin Šiljak (21 April 2016 – 10 August 2016)
- (Bosnia and Herzegovina) (Belgium) Rusmir Cviko (10 August 2016 – 8 August 2017)
- (China) Li Guoxu (8 August 2017 – 18 April 2018)
- (Bosnia and Herzegovina) Dželaludin Muharemović (18 April 2018 – 31 December 2018)

== Results ==
All-time league rankings

As of the end of 2018 season.

Year	Div	Pld	W	D	L	GF	GA	GD	Pts	Pos.	FA Cup	Super Cup	AFC	Att./G	Stadium
2014	3	14	7	6	1	29	9	18	27^{1}	5	R2	DNQ	DNQ		Jinzhou Stadium
2015	3	14	10	4	0	38	11	27	34^{1}	RU	R3	DNQ	DNQ	1,643	Jinzhou Stadium
2016	2	30	10	8	12	32	36	−4	38	14	R2	DNQ	DNQ	4,350	Jinzhou Stadium
2017	2	30	8	7	15	34	58	−24	31	14	R2	DNQ	DNQ	2,888	Jinzhou Stadium
2018	2	30	7	7	16	28	48	−20	28	15	R3	DNQ	DNQ	1,209	Jinzhou Stadium

- ^1 In group stage.

Key

	China top division
	China second division
	China third division
W	Winners
RU	Runners-up
3	Third place
	Relegated

- Pld = Played
- W = Games won
- D = Games drawn
- L = Games lost
- F = Goals for
- A = Goals against
- Pts = Points
- Pos = Final position
- DNQ = Did not qualify
- DNE = Did not enter
- NH = Not Held
- – = Does Not Exist
- R1 = Round 1
- R2 = Round 2
- R3 = Round 3
- R4 = Round 4
- F = Final
- SF = Semi-finals
- QF = Quarter-finals
- R16 = Round of 16
- Group = Group stage
- GS2 = Second Group stage
- QR1 = First Qualifying Round
- QR2 = Second Qualifying Round
- QR3 = Third Qualifying Round

== Seasons ==
China League Two		China League One		
2014	2015	2016	2017	2018
