= 2010 Dalian Shide F.C. season =

Dalian Shide F.C.
- Chairman: (China) Xu Ming
- Manager: (China) Xu Hong (China) Liu Zhongchang (caretaker) (South Korea) Park Sung-hwa
- Super League: 6th
- Top goalscorer: (South Korea) Ahn Jung-hwan (10 goals)

The 2010 Dalian Shide F.C. season was Dalian's 21st consecutive season in the top division of Chinese football.

== Players ==
As of 23 March 2010

No.	Name	Nat.	Place of birth	DOB	Age	Joined	From
Goalkeepers
1	Sun Shoubo	(China)	Dalian	11 June 1983	26 years	2005	Dalian Shide youth
22	Zhang Chong	(China)	Dalian	25 November 1987	22 years	2007	Dalian Shide youth
23	Jiang Hao	(China)	Dalian	82 December 1989	20 years	2008	Dalian Shide youth
Defenders
2	Porfirio López	(Costa Rica)	San José	10 September 1985	24 years	2010	(Costa Rica) Puntarenas
3	Zheng Jianfeng	(China)	Dalian	22 March 1989	20 years	2009	Dalian Shide youth
4	Xue Ya'nan	(China)	Dalian	5 June 1990	19 years	2009	Dalian Shide youth
5	Yang Boyu	(China)	Dalian	24 June 1989	20 years	2008	Dalian Shide youth
6	Zhang Yaokun ^{C}	(China)	Dalian	7 April 1981	28 years	1998	Dalian Shide youth
7	Zhao Honglüe	(China)	Dalian	4 December 1989	20 years	2009	Dalian Shide youth
8	Zhu Ting	(China)	Dalian	15 July 1985	24 years	2002	Dalian Shide youth
12	Du Longquan	(China)	Dalian	29 May 1988	21 years	2007	Dalian Shide youth
15	Zhao Mingjian	(China)	Dalian	22 November 1987	22 years	2005	Dalian Shide youth
25	Li Xuepeng	(China)	Dalian	18 September 1988	21 years	2007	Dalian Shide youth
29	Jiang Jihong	(China)	Dalian	8 February 1990	19 years	2010	Dalian Shide youth
30	Lu Qiang	(China)	Dalian	8 February 1989	20 years	-	Dalian Shide youth
Midfielders
13	Quan Lei	(China)	Dalian	13 January 1985	24 years	2004	Dalian Shide youth
14	Wang Xuanhong	(China)	Dalian	24 July 1989	20 years	2007	Dalian Shide youth
16	Hao Xingchen	(China)	Dalian	10 July 1987	22 years	2009	Dalian Shide youth
17	José Luis López Ramírez	(Costa Rica)	San José	31 March 1981	28 years	2010	(Costa Rica) Deportivo Saprissa
18	Li Zhichao	(China)	Dalian	19 February 1989	20 years	2009	Dalian Shide youth
20	Zhang Depeng	(China)	Dalian	9 October 1989	20 years	-	Dalian Shide youth
21	Lü Peng	(China)	Dalian	28 October 1989	20 years	2008	Dalian Shide youth
27	Wang Liang	(China)	Dalian	23 July 1989	20 years	2008	Dalian Shide youth
28	Chi Jinyu	(China)	Dalian	16 January 1989	20 years	-	Dalian Shide youth
31	Ni Yusong	(China)	Dalian	1 January 1991	18 years	2010	Dalian Shide youth
Forwards
10	Borko Veselinovic	(Serbia)	Priština	6 January 1986	23 years	2010	(South Korea) Incheon United
11	James Chamanga	(Zambia)	Luanshya	2 February 1980	29 years	2008	(South Africa) Moroka Swallows
19	Ahn Jung-hwan	(South Korea)	Paju	27 January 1976	33 years	2009	(South Korea) Busan IPark
32	Sheng Jun	(China)	Dalian	2 February 1990	19 years	-	Dalian Shide youth
Joined during the season
9	Martin Kamburov	(Bulgaria)	Svilengrad	13 October 1980	29 years	2010	(Bulgaria) Lokomotiv Sofia
24	Yan Feng	(China)	Dalian	7 February 1982	27 years	2010	Changchun Yatai
33	Márcio Senna	(Brazil)	São Paulo	21 May 1981	28 years	2010	Red Bull Brasil

== Chinese Super League ==
=== League table ===
Pos	Team	Pld	W	D	L	GF	GA	GD	Pts	Qualification or relegation
4	Hangzhou Greentown	30	13	9	8	38	30	+8	48 (Note: Shanghai: 4 pts, 3–2; Hangzhou: 1 pt, 2–3)	AFC Champions League Group stage
5	Beijing Guoan	30	12	10	8	35	29	+6	46	
6	Dalian Shide	30	10	12	8	40	37	+3	42	
7	Liaoning Whowin	30	10	10	10	39	36	+3	40 (Note: Liaoning: 4 pts, 3–1; Henan: 1 pt, 1–3)	
8	Henan Jianye	30	9	13	8	31	31	0	40	

Rules for classification: 1st points; 2nd head-to-head points; 3rd head-to-head goal difference; 4th head-to-head goals scored; 5th goal difference; 6th goals scored; 7th disciplinary points (1 point for each yellow card, 3 points for each red card). Head-to-Head: used when head-to-head record is used to rank tied teams.

=== Fixtures and results ===
28 March 2010 1	Shaanxi Chanba	1–1	Dalian Shide	Xi'an
15:30 (+8:00)	Mohammed Kallon 52' (pen.); Lyle Martin (yellow card) 54'	Report	Porfirio López 32'; Zhang Yaokun (yellow card) 49'	Stadium: Shaanxi Province Jiaodaruisen Stadium; Attendance: 47,000; Referee: Hu Pengchun

4 April 2010 2	Dalian Shide	0–0	Henan Jianye	Dalian
2:30:00 PM (UTC+08:00)	Lü Peng (yellow card) 38'; Wang Xuanhong (yellow card) 90+2'	Report	Miloš Bajalica (yellow card) 84'	Stadium: Jinzhou Stadium; Attendance: 8,816; Referee: Mo Weicong

11 April 2010 3	Qingdao Jonoon	1–1	Dalian Shide	Qingdao
15:30 (UTC+08:00)	Xu Jingjie (yellow card) 10'; Guo Liang (yellow card) 15'; Zheng Long (yellow card) 72'; Aleksandar Rodić (yellow card) 87' (goal) 89'	Report	Zhao Honglüe (yellow card) 33'; Lü Peng (yellow card) 74'; Wang Xuanhong (yellow card) 77'; Zhu Ting 88'	Stadium: Qingdao Tiantai Stadium; Attendance: 8,500; Referee: Tan Hai

18 April 2010 4	Dalian Shide	2–2	Shandong Luneng Taishan	Dalian
17:00 (UTC+08:00)	Zhu Ting (yellow card) 31'; James Chamanga 31'; Li Xuepeng (yellow card) 59'; Ahn Jung-hwan 72'	Report	Liu Jindong (yellow card) 71'; Han Peng 80', 90+4'	Stadium: Jinzhou Stadium; Attendance: 15,600; Referee: Tan Hai

25 April 2010 5	Changsha Ginde	2–3	Dalian Shide	Changsha
19:30 (UTC+08:00)	Wen Huyi 45'; Zhang Chenglin 55'	Report	Wang Xuanhong 15'; Jose López 39'; Li Xuepeng (yellow card) 42'; Porfirio López 62'; Ahn Jung-hwan 74'	Stadium: Helong Stadium; Attendance: 16,500; Referee: He Zhibiao

2 May 2010 6	Dalian Shide	0–2	Shanghai Shenhua	Shanghai
14:30 (UTC+08:00)	Quan Lei (yellow card) 57'; Li Xuepeng (yellow card) 71'	Report	Duvier Riascos (yellow card) 16' (goal) 72'; N'Lend 46'	Stadium: Hongkou Football Stadium; Attendance: 20,000; Referee: Yao Qing

7 May 2010 7	Hangzhou Greentown	1–0	Dalian Shide	Hangzhou
19:30 (UTC+08:00)	Wang Song 33' (pen.); Tang Jiashu (yellow card) 37'; Bari Mamatil (yellow card) 70'	Report	Zhao Mingjian (yellow card) 49'; Lü Peng (yellow card) 50'; Yang Boyu (yellow card) 83'	Stadium: Huanglong Stadium; Attendance: 9,650; Referee: Guo Baolong

15 May 2010 8	Dalian Shide	1–2	Tianjin Teda	Dalian
14:30 (UTC+08:00)	Wang Xuanhong 29'; Quan Lei (yellow card) 82'; Zhao Honglüe (yellow card) 85'; Li Zhichao (yellow card) 90+3'	Report	Wang Xinxin (yellow card) 38' (goal) 56'; Jiang Chen (yellow card) 43'; Marko Zorić (yellow card) 46'; Alfred Emuejeraye 70'; He Yang (yellow card) 71'; Rodolfo Rodríguez (yellow card) 90+4'	Stadium: Jinzhou Stadium; Attendance: 10,000; Referee: Zhao Liang

22 May 2010 9	Chongqing Lifan	1–3	Dalian Shide	Chongqing
15:30 (UTC+08:00)	José Duarte 38' (pen.)	Report	James Chamanga 12', 90+4' (yellow card) 64'; Wang Xuanhong 19'; Zhao Honglüe (yellow card) 74'	Stadium: Chongqing Olympic Sports Center; Referee: Wang Di

26 May 2010 10	Nanchang Bayi Hengyuan	1–1	Dalian Shide	Nanchang
15:40 (UTC+08:00)	Zhu Baojie 32'	Report	Wang Xuanhong 3'; Quan Lei (yellow card) 54'; James Chamanga (yellow card) 83'	Stadium: Nanchang Bayi Stadium; Referee: Wang Zhe

30 May 2010 11	Dalian Shide	0–2	Liaoning FC	Dalian
14:30 (UTC+08:00)	Zhao Mingjian (yellow card) 35'; Li Xuepeng (yellow card) 77'	Report	Chen Xing (yellow card) 29'; Zhang Xiaoyu 64' (yellow card) 90+3'; Yu Hanchao 78'	Stadium: Jinzhou Stadium; Referee: Tao Rancheng

14 July 2010 12	Jiangsu Sainty	0–0	Dalian Shide	Nanjing
15:30 (UTC+08:00)	–	Report	Zhao Honglüe (yellow card) 20'; Yan Feng (yellow card) 74'	Stadium: Nanjing Olympic Sports Center; Attendance: 11,000; Referee: Xu Hang

18 July 2010 13	Dalian Shide	3–0	Beijing Guoan	Dalian
19:00 (UTC+08:00)	Quan Lei (yellow card) 23'; Zhao Mingjian (yellow card) 37'; Li Xuepeng (yellow card) 47'; Zhu Ting 52'; Yan Feng 64'; Wang Xuanhong (yellow card) 84'; Ahn Jung-hwan 88'	Report	Zhang Yonghai (yellow card) 6'; Zhou Ting (yellow card) 56'; Lu Jiang (yellow card) 59'	Stadium: Jinzhou Stadium; Attendance: 11,000; Referee: Sun Bing

25 July 2010 14	Shenzhen Ruby	0–0	Dalian Shide	Shenzhen
15:30 (UTC+08:00)	Li Fei (yellow card) 74'; Song Chen (yellow card) 79'; Andy Nägelein (yellow card) 85'	Report	Lü Peng (yellow card) 36'; James Chamanga (yellow card) 37'	Stadium: Shenzhen City Stadium; Attendance: 13,300; Assistant referees: Zhou Gang

28 July 2010 15	Dalian Shide	2–1	Changchun Yatai	Dalian
19:00 (UTC+08:00)	Li Zhichao (yellow card) 42'; Zhang Yaokun 48'; Yang Boyu (yellow card) 48' (yellow-red card) 73'; Ahn Jung-hwan (yellow card) 56' (goal) 62'; Zheng Jianfeng (yellow card) 88'	Report	Sebastián Setti 28'; Zhang Xiaofei (yellow card) 66'; Miloš Mihajlov (yellow card) 75'	Stadium: Jinzhou Stadium; Attendance: 12,500; Referee: Song Wenfeng

Aug 1 2010 16	Dalian Shide	2–2	Shaanxi Chanba	Dalian
7:00:00 PM (UTC+08:00)	Ahn Jung-hwan 75' (pen.); James Chamanga 90'; Lü Peng (yellow card) 90+1'	Report	Sun Jihai (yellow card) 6'; Zheng Tao (yellow card) 29'; Jonas Salley (yellow card) 41' (red card) 46'; Qu Bo 48'; Yu Hai 53'	Stadium: Jinzhou Stadium; Attendance: 15,000; Referee: He Zhibiao

Aug 8 2010 17	Henan Jianye	0–1	Dalian Shide	Zhengzhou
7:45:00 PM (UTC+08:00)	He Bin (yellow card) 345'	Report	Zhang Yaokun (yellow card) 16'; Martin Kamburov (yellow card) 45'; Yan Feng (yellow card) 48'; Wang Xuanhong 78'	Stadium: Hanghai Stadium; Attendance: 20,619; Referee: Xu Hang

Aug 14 2010 18	Dalian Shide	3–2	Qingdao Jonoon	Dalian
7:00:00 PM (UTC+08:00)	Zhu Ting 14' (yellow card) 76'; Ahn Jung-hwan 84'; Quan Lei (yellow card) 86'; Stjepan Jukić 90' (o.g.)	Report	Lee Yoon-sub (yellow card) 5'; Aleksandar Rodić 5', 21'; Li Zhuangfei (yellow card) 58'; Liu Jun (yellow card) 64'	Stadium: Jinzhou Stadium; Attendance: 13,500; Referee: Hei Xiaohu

Aug 18 2010 19	Shandong Luneng Taishan	2–1	Dalian Shide	Ji'nan
7:30:00 PM (UTC+08:00)	Roda Antar 47'; Zhou Haibin (yellow card) 56'; Li Wei (yellow card) 61'; Han Peng 86'; Liu Jindong (yellow card) 90+2'	Report	Chamanga 7'; Yan Feng (yellow card) 61'; Kamburov (yellow card) 67'; Li Xuepeng (yellow card) 68'	Stadium: Shandong Provincial Stadium; Attendance: 17,646; Referee: Sun Baojie

Aug 22 2010 20	Dalian Shide	0–1	Changsha Ginde	Dalian
7:00:00 PM (UTC+08:00)	Quan Lei (yellow card) 8'; Yan Feng (yellow card) 57'	Report	Sandro (yellow card) 38'; Woo Joo-young (yellow card) 42'; Wasiu 74'; Zhang Lei (yellow card) 81'; Wen Huyi (yellow card) 81'; Frane Čačić (yellow card) 87'	Stadium: Jinzhou Stadium; Attendance: 16,000; Referee: Li Jun

Aug 29 2010 21	Shanghai Shenhua	1–1	Dalian Shide
7:45:00 PM (UTC+08:00)		Report		Attendance: 15125

Sep 12 2010 22	Dalian Shide	2–1	Hangzhou Greentown
7:00:00 PM (UTC+08:00)		Report		Attendance: 0

Sep 18 2010 23	Tianjin Teda	3–4	Dalian Shide
12:00:00 AM (UTC+08:00)		Report		Attendance: 0

Sep 25 2010 24	Dalian Shide	2–2	Chongqing Lifan
12:00:00 AM (UTC+08:00)		Report		Attendance: 0

Sep 29 2010 25	Dalian Shide	2–1	Nanchang Bayi Hengyuan
12:00:00 AM (UTC+08:00)		Report		Attendance: 0

Oct 16 2010 26	Liaoning FC	1–1	Dalian Shide
12:00:00 AM (UTC+08:00)		Report		Attendance: 0

Oct 24 2010 27	Dalian Shide	1–0	Jiangsu Sainty
12:00:00 AM (UTC+08:00)		Report		Attendance: 0

Oct 27 2010 28	Beijing Guoan	2–1	Dalian Shide
12:00:00 AM (UTC+08:00)		Report		Attendance: 0

Oct 31 2010 29	Dalian Shide	0–0	Shenzhen Ruby
12:00:00 AM (UTC+08:00)		Report		Attendance: 0

Nov 6 2010 30	Changchun Yatai	3–2	Dalian Shide
12:00:00 AM (UTC+08:00)		Report		Attendance: 0

== Squad statistics ==
=== Appearances and goals ===
No.	Pos.	Player	Nat.	Super League		
No.	Pos.	Player	Nat.	App.	Starts	Goals
1	GK	Sun Shoubo	(China)	22	22	0
2	DF	Porfirio López	(Costa Rica)	10	9	2
3	DF	Jianfeng Zheng	(China)	2	0	0
4	DF	Xue Ya'nan	(China)	7	1	0
5	DF	Yang Boyu	(China)	19	19	0
6	DF	Zhang Yaokun	(China)	26	26	1
7	DF	Zhao Honglüe	(China)	25	21	0
8	MF	Zhu Ting	(China)	28	28	4
9	FW	Martin Kamburov	(Bulgaria)	15	14	7
10	FW	Borko Veselinovic	(Serbia)	5	2	0
11	FW	James Chamanga	(Zambia)	28	28	9
12	DF	Du Longquan	(China)	8	4	0
13	MF	Quan Lei	(China)	19	12	0
14	MF	Wang Xuanhong	(China)	25	9	5
15	DF	Zhao Mingjian	(China)	28	28	0
16	MF	Hao Xingchen	(China)	1	0	0
17	FW	José Luis López	(Costa Rica)	9	8	0
18	MF	Li Zhichao	(China)	9	1	0
19	FW	Ahn Jung-hwan	(South Korea)	24	22	10
21	MF	Lü Peng	(China)	28	24	0
22	GK	Zhang Chong	(China)	9	8	0
23	GK	Jiang Hao	(China)	0	0	0
24	MF	Yan Feng	(China)	12	9	1
25	DF	Li Xuepeng	(China)	24	24	0
27	DF	Wang Liang	(China)	2	1	0
29	DF	Jiang Jihong	(China)	8	1	0
33	FW	Márcio Senna	(Brazil)	10	9	0
TOTALS						39

=== Goal scorers ===
Rank	Player	Goals
1	Ahn Jung-hwan	10
2	James Chamanga	9
3	Martin Kamburov	7
4	Wang Xuanhong	5
5	Zhu Ting	4
6	Porfirio López	2
7	Yan Feng	1
7	Zhang Yaokun	1
Total		39
