= 2012 Dalian Shide F.C. season =

Dalian Shide F.C.
- Chairman: Xu Ming
- Manager: Nelo Vingada
- Super League: 14th, disbanded
- FA Cup: 4th round
- Top goalscorer: Martin Kamburov (11 goals)
- Highest home attendance: 28,921
- Lowest home attendance: 5,219
- Average home league attendance: 11,093
Home colours	Away colours

The 2012 Dalian Shide F.C. season is Dalian's 23rd consecutive season in the top division of Chinese football, and the last season before the team disbanded. Shide also competed in the Chinese FA Cup.

== Players ==
As of 5 March 2012

=== First team ===
Note: Flags indicate national team as defined under FIFA eligibility rules; some limited exceptions apply. Players may hold more than one non-FIFA nationality.

No.	Pos.	Nation	Player
1	GK	CHN	Sun Shoubo
2	MF	CHN	Jin Yangyang
3	DF	CHN	Zheng Jianfeng
4	MF	CHN	Xue Ya'nan
5	DF	CHN	Yang Boyu
6	DF	CHN	Zhang Yaokun (captain)
7	DF	CHN	Zhao Honglüe
8	FW	CHN	Zhu Ting
9	FW	BUL	Martin Kamburov
10	FW	BRA	Adriano
11	FW	ZAM	James Chamanga
12	MF	CHN	Lü Peng
13	MF	CHN	Quan Lei
14	FW	CHN	Zhao Xuebin
15	MF	CHN	Zhao Mingjian

No.	Pos.	Nation	Player
16	FW	CHN	Hao Xingchen
17	FW	CHN	Liu Yingchen
19	FW	CHN	Yan Xiangchuang
20	FW	POR	Ricardo Esteves
21	GK	CHN	Jiang Hao
22	GK	CHN	Zhang Chong
23	DF	KOR	Park Dong-Hyuk
24	MF	CHN	Yan Feng
25	DF	CHN	Jiang Jihong
27	DF	CHN	Li Xuepeng
28	MF	CHN	Qu Jiachen
29	MF	CHN	Sun Guowen
30	MF	CHN	Ni Yusong
31	DF	CHN	Wang Guanghao

=== Reserve squad ===
Note: Flags indicate national team as defined under FIFA eligibility rules; some limited exceptions apply. Players may hold more than one non-FIFA nationality.

No.	Pos.	Nation	Player
41	GK	CHN	Chen Junlin
42	FW	CHN	Nan Yunqi
43	DF	CHN	Li Zhiyu
44	DF	CHN	Wang Zihao
45	MF	CHN	Zheng Zhihao
46	MF	CHN	Wang Shixin
47	MF	CHN	Chen Zheng
49	MF	CHN	Han Yi
50	DF	CHN	Tang Chuanshun
51	FW	CHN	Xie Hui

No.	Pos.	Nation	Player
52	FW	CHN	Wang Chengkuai
53	DF	CHN	Li Shizhou
54	DF	CHN	Qin Tao
55	DF	CHN	Wang Lei
56	MF	CHN	Hong Youpeng
57	DF	CHN	Zhu Junhui
58	MF	CHN	Zhang Zhengjun
59	MF	CHN	Wang Xudong
60	DF	CHN	Zhang Zheng

=== On loan ===
Note: Flags indicate national team as defined under FIFA eligibility rules; some limited exceptions apply. Players may hold more than one non-FIFA nationality.

No.	Pos.	Nation	Player
—	DF	CHN	Yao Bo (at Yanbian Baekdu Tigers until 31 May 2012)
—	GK	CHN	Zhang Zhenqiang (at Shanghai Shenxin until 31 December 2012)
—	DF	CRC	Porfirio López (at (United States) Philadelphia Union until ?)

No.	Pos.	Nation	Player
18	MF	CHN	Li Zhichao (at Beijing Baxy until 31 December 2012)
33	FW	CHN	Wang Liang (at Beijing Yitong Kuche until 31 December 2012)

== Competitions ==
=== Chinese Super League ===
==== League table ====
Pos	Team	Pld	W	D	L	GF	GA	GD	Pts	Qualification or relegation
12	Shandong Luneng	30	8	12	10	46	43	+3	36 (Note: Liaoning, 10pts; Hangzhou, 9pts; Shandong, 6pts, GF=4, GA=5; Qingdao, 6pts, GF=4, GA=5)	
13	Qingdao Jonoon	30	10	6	14	26	34	−8	36	
14	Dalian Shide (D, R)	30	8	10	12	39	49	−10	34	Disbanded after season (Note: On 30 November 2012, Dalian Shide were acquisited by Aerbin Group and merged into Dalian Aerbin after their owner was arrested.)
15	Shanghai Shenxin	30	6	12	12	36	35	+1	30	
16	Henan Jianye (R)	30	7	5	18	28	56	−28	26	Relegation to China League One

Source: Chinese Super League (in Chinese)
Rules for classification: 1) points; 2) goal difference; 3) number of goals scored; 4) head-to-head goals scored; 5) goal difference; 6) goals scored; 7) disciplinary points (1 point for each yellow card, 3 points for each red card). Head-to-Head: Only used at the end of the season when two or more teams need the head-to-head rules to break a tie.
(D) Disqualified; (R) Relegated

==== Matches ====
10 March 2012 1	Dalian Shide	1–2	Changchun Yatai	Jinzhou Stadium
Saturday 15:30	Esteves 4'; Li Zhichao (yellow card) 90'	Report	Ismailov 10', 27'; Wang Dong (yellow card) 26'; John Mosquera (yellow card) 65'	Attendance: 12,361; Referee: Xu Hang

18 March 2012 2	Dalian Aerbin	3–3	Dalian Shide	Jinzhou Stadium
16:00	Canales 45+2'; Chang Lin 49'; Dong Xuesheng 69'	Report	Chamanga 44'; Zhao Mingjian (yellow card) 54'; Park Dong-Hyuk 59'; Yang Boyu 85'; Yan Feng (yellow card) 90'	Attendance: 25,791; Referee: (South Korea) Kim Hee-Gon

24 March 2012 3	Dalian Shide	2–1	Qingdao Jonoon	Jinzhou Stadium
15:30	Kamburov 45' (pen.) 87' (yellow card) 47'; Ricardo Esteves (yellow card) 65'	Report	Zheng Long 25'; Li Peng (yellow card) 53'	Attendance: 5,713; Referee: (China) Hai Tan

1 April 2012 4	Jiangsu Sainty	5–0	Dalian Shide	Nanjing Olympic Sports Center
16:30	Ji Xiang 25'; Sun Ke 47', 55'; Dănălache 79', 89'	Report	Yan Feng (yellow card) 68'; Park Dong-Hyuk (yellow card) 89'	Attendance: 20,953; Referee: (China) Fan Qi

8 April 2012 5	Dalian Shide	0–0	Beijing Guoan	Jinzhou Stadium
16:30	Xue Ya'nan (yellow card) 84'	Report	Zhou Ting (yellow card) 38'; Reinaldo (yellow card) 48'	Attendance: 10,825; Referee: (China) Yao Qing

15 April 2012 6	Guangzhou R&F	1–0	Dalian Shide	Yuexiushan Stadium
18:45	Griffiths 70'	Report	Yan Xiangchuang (yellow card) 30'; Chamanga (yellow card) 31'; Lü Peng (yellow card) 63'	Attendance: 5,953; Referee: (China) Shi Zhenlu

21 April 2012 7	Dalian Shide	0–1	Shanghai Shenhua	Jinzhou Stadium
17:00	Yan Feng (yellow card) 32'; Yang Boyu (yellow card) 82'	Report	Wang Fei (yellow card) 25'; Dai Lin (yellow card) 55'; Yu Tao (yellow card) 65'; Feng Renliang 80'	Attendance: 5,219; Referee: (Australia) Ryan Shepheard

28 April 2012 8	Hangzhou Greentown	1–1	Dalian Shide	Yellow Dragon Sports Center
20:35	Zheng Kewei (yellow card) 10'; Mazola 72'	Report	Zhao Honglüe 19'; Zhang Chong (yellow card) 69'; Chamanga (yellow card) 80'; Yan Feng (yellow card) 86'	Attendance: 12,532; Referee: (China) Wang Di

6 May 2012 9	Dalian Shide	4–1	Tianjin Teda	Jinzhou Stadium
20:35	Chamanga 9', 28', 87'; Kamburov 31'; Zhao Honglüe (yellow card) 44'	Report	Li Weifeng (yellow card) 12'; Šumulikoski (yellow card) 77'; Goian (yellow card) 81'; Ars 86'; Li Benjian (yellow card) 90+9'	Attendance: 6,158; Referee: (China) Yao Qing

11 May 2012 10	Dalian Shide	3–1	Guangzhou Evergrande	Jinzhou Stadium
20:00	Yan Xiangchuang 10'; Zhu Ting 58'; Kamburov 67'	Report	Qin Sheng (yellow card) 21' (goal) 42'	Attendance: 7,682; Referee: (China) Hai Tan

19 May 2012 11	Shandong Luneng Taishan	2–2	Dalian Shide	Shandong Provincial Stadium
20:30	Xia Ningning (yellow card) 21'; Fabiano 28' (pen.) (yellow card) 28'; Obina (yellow card) 41'; Gilberto Macena 68'	Report	Yang Boyu (yellow card) 16'; Zhang Chong (yellow card) 27'; Quan Lei 60'; Park Dong-Hyuk 81'; Chamanga (yellow card) 90+2'	Attendance: 13,297; Referee: (China) Wang Jin

27 May 2012 12	Dalian Shide	2–2	Liaoning Whowin	Jinzhou Stadium
20:00	Zhu Ting 33' (red card) 33'; Chamanga (yellow card) 52'; Kamburov 67' (pen.)	Report	Zhang Jingyang 19'; Yang Xu 21'; Yang Shanping (yellow card) 56'; Zhang Ye (yellow card) 64'	Attendance: 14,281

17 June 2012 13	Shanghai Shenxin	1–1	Dalian Shide	Jinshan Sports Centre
20:45	Yang Jiawei 38'; Wang Yun (yellow card) 69'	Report	Kamburov 26'; Yan Feng (yellow card) 38'; Zhao Honglüe (yellow card) 76'	Attendance: 13,171; Referee: (China) Xu Fuxin

23 June 2012 14	Dalian Shide	0–0	Henan Jianye	Jinzhou Stadium
20:45	Zhao Honglüe (yellow card) 51'; Lü Peng (yellow card) 77'; Kamburov (yellow card) 90'	Report	Tan Wangsong (yellow card) 12'; Lu Feng (yellow card) 54'; Zhang Lu (yellow card) 64'	Attendance: 10,581; Referee: (China) Fu Ming

1 July 2012 15	Guizhou Renhe	2–0	Dalian Shide	Guiyang Olympic Sports Center
20:30	Qu Bo 5'; Muslimović 77'	Report	Kamburov (yellow card) 20' (yellow-red card) 69'; Zhao Honglüe (yellow card) 39'	Attendance: 30,082; Referee: (China) Xu Fuxin

9 July 2012 16	Changchun Yatai	0–1	Dalian Shide	Development Area Stadium
20:35	Wang Dong (yellow card) 26'; Lü Jianjun (yellow card) 86'	Report	Chamanga 11' (pen.); Zhao Mingjian (yellow card) 21'; Ni Yusong (yellow card) 29'; Zhu Ting (yellow card) 73'; Lü Peng (yellow card) 83'; Quan Lei (yellow card) 84'	Attendance: 16,316; Referee: (China) Xu Hang

14 July 2012 17	Dalian Shide	3–2	Dalian Aerbin	Jinzhou Stadium
20:00	Chamanga 3', 18'; Zhao Honglüe (yellow card) 26'; Kamburov 53'; Zhu Ting (yellow card) 58'	Report	Yu Dabao 20'; Utaka 57' (pen.)	Attendance: 28,921; Referee: (China) Fan Qi

22 July 2012 18	Qingdao Jonoon	1–2	Dalian Shide	Qingdao Tiantai Stadium
16:30	Bruno Meneghel 48'; Melkam (yellow card) 63'	Report	Yan Xiangchuang 35' (yellow card) 81'; Chamanga 77'; Yan Feng (yellow card) 90'	Attendance: 8,271; Referee: (China) Fan Qi

29 July 2012 19	Dalian Shide	1–3	Jiangsu Sainty	Jinzhou Stadium
20:00	Chamanga 65'	Report	Dănălache 61'; Eleílson 70' (yellow card) 90+3'; Krivets 90+3'	Attendance: 6,139; Referee: (China) Yao Qing

4 August 2012 20	Beijing Guoan	1–0	Dalian Shide	Workers Stadium
20:30	Xu Liang 74'; Zhou Ting (yellow card) 79'	Report	Park Dong-Hyuk (yellow card) 26'	Attendance: 33,486; Referee: (China) Wang Di

11 August 2012 21	Dalian Shide	4–1	Guangzhou R&F	Jinzhou Stadium
20:30	Adriano 14', 90+1' (yellow card) 57'; Yan Feng (yellow card) 34'; Kamburov 67' (pen.); Park Dong-Hyuk 80'	Report	Xu Bo (yellow card) 28'; Griffiths (yellow card) 32'; Li Yan (yellow card) 51'; Davi 53'; Yakubu (yellow card) 64'; Tang Miao (yellow card) 79'	Attendance: 6,751; Referee: (China) Tao Rancheng

18 August 2012 22	Shanghai Shenhua	0–0	Dalian Shide	Hongkou Football Stadium
20:45	Moreno (yellow card) 46'; Dai Lin (yellow card) 71'	Report	Park Dong-Hyuk (yellow card) 46'; Chamanga (yellow card) 53'; Zhang Yaokun (yellow card) 83'; Zhang Chong (yellow card) 88'	Attendance: 22,356; Referee: (China) Ma Li

25 August 2012 23	Dalian Shide	2–3	Hangzhou Greentown	Jinzhou Stadium
20:30	Yan Feng 72'; Zhang Yaokun 82'; Adriano (yellow card) 90'	Report	Wang Song 34'; Fan Xiaodong (yellow card) 43'; Renatinho 50'; Feng Gang 68'; Mazola (yellow card) 77'	Attendance: 13,111; Referee: (China) Yao Qing

14 September 2012 24	Tianjin Teda	1–1	Dalian Shide	TEDA Football Stadium
20:30	Lucian Goian (yellow card) 30'; Sjoerd Ars 45+2'; Li Weifeng (yellow card) 62'	Report	Martin Kamburov 35', (yellow card) 51'; Lü Peng (yellow card) 77'	Attendance: 13,337; Referee: (China) Tan Hai

23 September 2012 25	Guangzhou Evergrande	3–1	Dalian Shide	Tianhe Stadium
20:35	Li Jianhua 15'; Dario Conca 33'; Sun Xiang (yellow card) 49'; Qin Sheng (yellow card) 55'; Zhang Linpeng 62'	Report	Zhang Yaokun (yellow card) 26', (goal) 53'; Quan Lei (yellow card) 35'	Attendance: 36,137; Referee: (China) Xu Hang

29 September 2012 26	Dalian Shide	1–1	Shandong Luneng Taishan	Jinzhou Stadium
20:30	Zhu Ting (yellow card) 45'; Martin Kamburov 58' (pen.); Adriano (yellow card) 79'	Report	Roda Antar 30' (pen.); Hao Junmin (yellow card) 56'	Attendance: 8,786; Referee: (China) Ma Li

6 October 2012 27	Liaoning Whowin	3–2	Dalian Shide	Tiexi New District Sports Center
20:30	Yu Hanchao 2', (yellow card) 60'; Wang Liang (yellow card) 32'; Zhao Junzhe (yellow card) 51'; Zhang Ye (yellow card) 60'; Milos Trifunovic 77'	Report	Zhao Mingjian (yellow card) 1'; Lü Peng 24' (o.g.); James Chamanga 45', 90+4'	Attendance: 15,824; Referee: (South Korea) Choi Dae-Woo

20 October 2012 28	Dalian Shide	1–4	Shanghai Shenxin	Jinzhou Stadium
16:30	Adriano 12', (yellow card) 86'; Zhu Ting (yellow card) 72'; Yan Feng (yellow card) 80'	Report	Wang Yun 19'; Zhu Baojie (yellow card) 17'; Anselmo 45' (pen.) 84'; Antonio (yellow card) 47', (goal) 52'	Attendance: 10,889; Referee: (South Korea) Choi Dae-Woo

27 October 2012 29	Henan Jianye	0–1	Dalian Shide	Zhengzhou Hanghai Stadium
16:30	Xiao Zhi (yellow card) 19'	Report	Yan Xiangchuang 54', (yellow card) 89'; Zhao Mingjian (yellow card) 90'	Attendance: 15,236; Referee: (Australia) K. Griffiths-Jones

3 November 2012 30	Dalian Shide	0–3	Guizhou Renhe	Jinzhou Stadium
15:30	Yang Boyu (yellow card) 7'; Zhao Mingjian (yellow card) 55'	Report	Sun Jihai (yellow card) 34'; Dino Djulbic (yellow card) 48'; Chen Jie 66'; Yu Hai 72'; Rafa Jordà 90+3'	Attendance: 18,971; Referee: (China) Wang Zhe

=== Chinese FA Cup ===
26 June 2012 3	Dalian Shide	8–0	Yanbian Baekdu Tigers FC	Dalian
20:00		Report		Stadium: Jinzhou Stadium

19 July 2012 4	Guizhou Renhe	2–0	Dalian Shide	Guiyang
16:30	Yu Hai 70'; Shen Tianfeng 89'		Hao Xingchen (yellow card); Ni Yusong (yellow card); Zheng Jianfeng (red card)	Stadium: Guiyang Olympic Sports Center
