= 2011 Dalian Shide F.C. season =

Dalian Shide F.C.
- Chairman: Xu Ming
- Manager: Park Sung-hwa; Li Xicai (caretaker); Gai Zengjun (caretaker); Nelo Vingada
- Super League: 12th
- FA Cup: 3rd round
- Top goalscorer: Martin Kamburov (10 goals)
- Highest home attendance: 25,000
- Lowest home attendance: 3,325
- Average home league attendance: 17,148
Home colours	Away colours

The 2011 Dalian Shide F.C. season was Dalian's 22nd consecutive season in the top division of Chinese football.

== Overview ==
South Korean manager Park Sung-hwa remained at the beginning of the season. He wanted to build his team style by trusting South Korean players and put team captain Zhang Yaokun to the reserve team, while made many changes to the technical staff. This caused many conflict between him and the rest of the team. In May, after losing 3 goals to Shandong Luneng Taishan, Dalian Shide fired Park, and brought Portuguese Nelo Vingada instead. They merely escaped from relegation, ended up 12th in the league.

== Players ==
As of 29 March 2011

Note: Flags indicate national team as defined under FIFA eligibility rules; some limited exceptions apply. Players may hold more than one non-FIFA nationality.

No.	Pos.	Nation	Player
1	GK	CHN	Sun Shoubo
2	DF	CHN	Jin Yangyang
3	DF	CHN	Zheng Jianfeng
4	DF	CHN	Xue Ya'nan
5	DF	CHN	Yang Boyu
6	DF	CHN	Zhang Yaokun (captain)
7	FW	CHN	Zhao Honglüe
8	FW	CHN	Zhu Ting
9	FW	BUL	Martin Kamburov
10	MF	CHN	Yan Song
11	FW	ZAM	James Chamanga
12	FW	CHN	Han Jiabao
13	MF	CHN	Quan Lei
14	MF	CHN	Wang Xuanhong
15	MF	CHN	Zhao Mingjian
16	MF	KOR	Jeon Kwang-Jin
17	MF	CHN	Wang Liang
18	MF	CHN	Li Zhichao
19	FW	KOR	Ahn Jung-Hwan
20	DF	KOR	Kim Jin-Kyu
21	MF	CHN	Lü Peng

No.	Pos.	Nation	Player
22	GK	CHN	Zhang Chong
23	GK	CHN	Jiang Hao
24	MF	CHN	Yan Feng
25	FW	CHN	Hao Xingchen
27	MF	CHN	Li Xuepeng
28	MF	CHN	Wang Yun
29	DF	CHN	Jiang Jihong
30	MF	CHN	Ni Yusong
31	MF	CHN	Sun Guowen
32	FW	CHN	Zhao Xuebin
33	DF	CHN	Li Zhiyu
34	DF	CHN	Wang Guanghao
35	MF	CHN	Wang Shixin
36	DF	CHN	Yao Bo
37	MF	CHN	Liu Yingchen
38	FW	CHN	Nan Yunqi
39	DF	CHN	Qu Jiachen
40	GK	CHN	Zhang Zhenqiang
41	MF	CHN	Yan Xiangchuang
42	DF	UZB	Murod Khalmukhamedov

== Chinese Super League ==
=== League table ===
Pos	Team	Pld	W	D	L	GF	GA	GD	Pts	Qualification or relegation
10	Tianjin TEDA	30	8	13	9	37	41	−4	37 (Note: Tianjin, 3 pts, 2–2; Shanghai, 3 pts, 2–2)	2012 AFC Champions League Group stage (Note: Tianjin TEDA qualified for the 2012 AFC Champions League by winning the 2011 Chinese FA Cup.)
11	Shanghai Shenhua	30	11	4	15	31	41	−10	37	
12	Dalian Shide	30	7	11	12	27	43	−16	32 (Note: Dalian, 6 pts, 3–1; Henan, 0 pts, 1–3)	
13	Henan Jianye	30	7	11	12	29	35	−6	32	
14	Nanchang Hengyuan	30	8	5	17	20	41	−21	29	

Updated to match(es) played on 2 November 2011. Source: http://csl.sina.com.cn/statistics/
Rules for classification: 1st points; 2nd head-to-head points; 3rd head-to-head goal difference; 4th head-to-head goals scored; 5th goal difference; 6th goals scored; 7th disciplinary points (1 point for each yellow card, 3 points for each red card). Head-to-Head: used when head-to-head record is used to rank tied teams.

=== Fixtures and results ===
MD.	Date	Time	H/A	Opponent	Res.F–A	Att.	Goalscorers and disciplined players		Location	Stadium	Report
MD.	Date	Time	H/A	Opponent	Res.F–A	Att.	Dalian Shide	Opponent	Location	Stadium	Report
1	Apr 2	20:00	A	Guangzhou Evergrande	0-1	50,000	Zhao Mingjian (yellow card) 37'; Kim Jin-kyu (yellow card) 79'; Yan Feng (yellow card) 84'	Cléo 49'	Guangzhou	Tianhe Stadium	
2	Apr 9	15:30	A	Chengdu Tiancheng	0-0	18,750	Quan Lei (yellow card) 33'; Martin Kamburov (yellow card) 45'		Chengdu	Chengdu Longquanyi Football Stadium	
3	Apr 16	15:30	H	Nanchang Hengyuan	2-1	15,180	Martin Kamburov 18', 58'; Li Xuepeng (yellow card) 63'	Ko Jae-sung (yellow card) 42'; Zhu Baojie (yellow card) 42'; Li Lei 51'	Dalian	Jinzhou Stadium	
4	Apr 25	19:30	A	Beijing Guoan	0-3	34,652	Li Xuepeng (yellow card) 20'; Zhang Yaokun (yellow card) 54'; Kim Jin-kyu (yellow card) 60'; Martin Kamburov (yellow card) 73'; Zhao Honglüe (yellow card) 78'	Zhang Xinxin (yellow card) 14'; Joel Griffiths 27'; Zhang Xizhe 79'; Martinez 90+4'	Beijing	Workers' Stadium	
5	Apr 30	15:30	A	Qingdao Jonoon	1-2	5,393	Martin Kamburov (yellow card) 60' (goal) 70'	Éber Luís Cucchi 35', 55' (yellow card) 37' (yellow-red card) 90+4'; Zheng Long (yellow card) 65'; Guo Liang (yellow card) 86'	Qingdao	Qingdao Tiantai Stadium	
6	May 8	15:30	A	Liaoning Whowin	0-3	20,058	Zheng Jianfeng (yellow card) 15'; Jiang Jihong (yellow card) 84'	Yang Xu 39', 85' (yellow card) 42'; Erivaldo Saraiva 43'; Qin Sheng (yellow card) 49'; Zhang Xiaoyu (yellow card) 88'	Shenyang	Tiexi New District Sports Center	
7	May 15	15:30	H	Shenzhen Ruby	0-0	10,188	Li Zhichao (yellow card) 33'; Zheng Jianfeng (yellow card) 52'; Zhao Honglüe (yellow card) 70'	Xiang Jun (yellow card) 55'; Dilmurat Batur (yellow card) 86'; Andy Nagelein (yellow card) 90'	Dalian	Jinzhou Stadium	
8	May 21	19:45	A	Henan Jianye	1-0	13,963	Sun Shoubo (yellow card) 9'; Kim Jin-kyu (yellow card) 19'; Lü Peng (yellow card) 56'; Zhao Xuebin 89'	Gu Cao (yellow card) 39'; Zhang Li (yellow card) 72'	Zhengzhou	Zhengzhou Hanghai Stadium	
9	May 29	15:30	H	Shandong Luneng	0-3	15,432	Li Xuepeng (yellow card) 52'	Roda Antar 60'; Han Peng 78', 89'	Dalian	Jinzhou Stadium	
10	Jun 11	15:30	A	Changchun Yatai	2-2	11,800	Yan Feng (yellow card) 5'; Ahn Jung-hwan 60', 65'; Jiang Jihong (yellow card) 85'	Dori (yellow card) 23'; Wang Dong (yellow card) 44'; Du Zhenyu 45'; Wang Wanpeng (yellow card) 63'; Claudinei (yellow card) 66'; Anzur Ismailov 84'	Changchun	Development Area Stadium	
11	Jun 18	19:00	H	Tianjin Teda	1-1	15,816	Li Zhichao 18' (yellow card) 17' (yellow-red card) 45'	Chen Tao (yellow card) 27' (yellow-red card) 59'; Yu Dabao 33'	Dalian	Jinzhou Stadium	
12	Sep 14	17:00	A	Shanxi Chanba	3-1	22,100	Yan Xiangchuang 22'; Martin Kamburov 86'; Wang Xuanhong (yellow card) 87' (goal) 90+1'	Zhao Xuri (yellow card) 16'; Zhang Chenglin (yellow card) 38'; Yu Hai 71'	Xi'an	Shaanxi Province Stadium	
13	Jun 26	19:00	H	Shanghai Shenhua	1-2	3,325	Yan Feng (yellow card) 17'; Zhu Ting 28'	Wang Lin (yellow card) 13'; Luis Salmerón 32' (yellow card) 89'; Jiang Kun 40'	Dalian	Jinzhou Stadium	
14	Jul 2	19:50	A	Jiangsu Sainty	0-4	18,630	Sun Shoubo (yellow card) 18'; Zhang Yaokun (yellow card) 28'; Yang Boyu (yellow card) 51'	Cristian Dănălache 19' (pen.) 83'; Bruce Djite 53' (yellow card) 54'; Alex Wilkinson (yellow card) 77'; Tan Si 88'; Ren Hang (yellow card) 89'	Nanjing	Nanjing Olympic Sports Center	
15	Jul 6	19:00	H	Hangzhou Greentown	1-1	10,180	Yang Boyu 3' (yellow card) 36'; Li Xuepeng (yellow card) 32'; Zhao Honglüe (yellow card) 47'; James Chamanga (yellow card) 85'	Fan Xiaodong (yellow card) 21'; Paulo Pezzolano 29'; Jiao Zhe (yellow card) 32'; Rong Hao (yellow card) 58'; Sebastián Vázquez (yellow card) 75'; Adam Griffiths 85'	Dalian	Jinzhou Stadium	
16	Jul 10	19:00	H	Guangzhou Evergrande	1-3	21,170	James Chamanga (yellow card) 29' (goal) 84'; Zhao Honglüe (yellow card) 42'; Lü Peng (yellow card) 60'	Wu Pingfeng (yellow card) 54'; Zheng Zhi (yellow card) 57'; Cléo 80'; Muriqui 85', 89'	Dalian	Jinzhou Stadium	
17	Jul 14	19:00	H	Chengdu Tiancheng	2-0	21,206	Martin Kamburov (yellow card) 25'; Zhang Yaokun 38'; Lü Peng (yellow card) 45'; Yan Xiangchuang 75'	Feng Zhuoyi (yellow card) 48'; Li Jianbin (yellow card) 63'; Jonas Salley (yellow card) 71'	Dalian	Jinzhou Stadium	
18	Jul 31	19:30	A	Nanchang Hengyuan	0-1	11,432	Zhang Yaokun (yellow card) 33'; Zhao Honglüe (yellow card) 35'; Li Xuepeng (yellow card) 90'	Jiang Zhipeng (yellow card) 43'; Ko Jae-sung (yellow card) 56'; JXu Wen (yellow card) 74' (goal) 81' (pen.); Paulão (yellow card) 90'	Nanchang	Nanchang Bayi Stadium	
19	Aug 6	19:30	H	Beijing Guoan	0-0	21,280	Xue Ya'nan (yellow card) 52'		Dalian	Jinzhou Stadium	
20	Aug 13	19:30	H	Qingdao Jonoon	3-2	20,137	Martin Kamburov 54', 90'; Murod Khalmukhamedov (yellow card) 59'; James Chamanga 82'	Aziz Ibragimov 15'; Zheng Long 27'; Zou Zheng (yellow card) 67'	Dalian	Jinzhou Stadium	
21	Aug 17	19:30	H	Liaoning Whowin	1-1	24,790	Yang Boyu 24'; Adriano 63'; Xue Ya'nan (yellow card) 72'; Murod Khalmukhamedov (yellow card) 85'	Kim Yoo-jin (yellow card) 10' (goal) 90'; Yang Xu (yellow card) 74'	Dalian	Jinzhou Stadium	
22	Aug 21	19:30	A	Shenzhen Ruby	2-4	6,352	Adriano 41', 78'	Chris Killen 15'; Dong Xuesheng 4', 36', 53'	Huizhou	Huizhou Olympic Stadium	
23	Sep 10	19:30	H	Henan Jianye	2-1	18,650	Adriano (yellow card) 30' (yellow-red card) 89'; Quan Lei 51'; Martin Kamburov 73'; Zhao Honglüe (yellow card) 82'	Gu Cao (yellow card) 24'; Chris Katongo 52'	Dalian	Jinzhou Stadium	
24	Sep 18	19:30	A	Shandong Luneng	0-0	6,117	Yan Xiangchuang (yellow card) 18'; Lü Peng (yellow card) 21'; Martin Kamburov (yellow card) 35'; Li Xuepeng (yellow card) 40'	Liu Jindong (yellow card) 87'	Jinan	Jinan Olympic Sports Center Stadium	
25	Sep 24	19:30	H	Changchun Yatai	1-1	24,000	Yan Feng (yellow card) 17'; Martin Kamburov 39'	Qu Xiaohui (yellow card) 22'; Yovanny Arrechea 41'	Dalian	Jinzhou Stadium	
26	Sep 28	19:30	A	Tianjin Teda	2-2	16,572	Lü Peng (yellow card) 7'; Adriano 55'; Martin Kamburov 74'	Marko Zorić (yellow card) 4'; Marius Bilașco 5'; Hu Rentian 47'	Tianjin	Tianjin Olympic Center Stadium	
27	Oct 15	15:30	H	Shanxi Chanba	1-0	10,860	Lü Peng (yellow card) 40'; Martin Kamburov 66' (pen.); Zhao Honglüe (yellow card) 72'	Fabio Firmani (yellow card) 57'; Zhu Jiawei (yellow card) 89'	Dalian	Jinzhou Stadium	
28	Oct 23	19:45	A	Shanghai Shenhua	0-1	4,325	Quan Lei (yellow card) 26'; Zhang Yaokun (yellow card) 43'; Yan Feng (yellow card) 52'	Wu Xi 12'; Qiu Tianyi (yellow card) 62'	Shanghai	Hongkou Stadium	
29	Oct 29	15:30	H	Jiangsu Sainty	0-3	25,000	Xue Ya'nan (yellow card) 42'; Zhu Ting (yellow card) 80'	Cristian Dănălache 25' (pen.), 63'; Lu Bofei (yellow card) 35' (goal) 84'	Dalian	Jinzhou Stadium	
30	Nov 2	15:30	A	Hangzhou Greentown	0-0	2,681	Li Zhichao (yellow card) 45'; Yan Xiangchuang (yellow card) 49'	Jin Pengxiang (yellow card) 16'; Cao Xuan (yellow card) 77'	Hangzhou	Hangzhou Huanglong Stadium	

== Chinese FA Cup ==
May 11, 2011 3	Dalian Shide	1 – 2	Yanbian FC	Dalian
		Report		Stadium: Jinzhou Stadium; Referee: Ma Li
