= Shide =

Shide may refer to:

- Shide (monk), Chinese Buddhist monk and poet
- Shide (Shinto), a zig-zag shaped paper streamer associated with Shinto
- Shide, Isle of Wight, settlement on the Isle of Wight, England
- Dalian Shide F.C., a former Chinese football club
- Shide Group, a Chinese building supply company that owned Dalian Shide F.C.

== See also ==
- Shiden (disambiguation)
