= Wang Xiaolong (footballer, born 1989) =

Chinese association football player

Personal information
- Date of birth: 18 February 1989 (age 37)
- Place of birth: Dalian, Liaoning, China
- Height: 1.86 m (6 ft 1 in)
- Position: Midfielder

Youth career
- Dalian Shide

Senior career*
| Years | Team | Apps | (Gls) |
| 2008 | Dalian Shide Siwu | 10 | (0) |
| 2011 | Chongqing FC | 0 | (0) |
| 2012 | Guizhou Hengfeng | 27 | (2) |
| 2013–2014 | Lijiang Jiayunhao | 25 | (1) |
| 2015 | Hebei China Fortune | 0 | (0) |
| 2016–2020 | Shaanxi Chang'an Athletic | 42 | (3) |

Managerial career
- 2023: Shaanxi Union (assistant)
- 2024-: Shaanxi Union (team manager)
- * Club domestic league appearances and goals as of 31 December 2020

Wang Xiaolong (Chinese: 王晓龙; born 18 February 1989) is a Chinese football coach and former footballer.

== Club career ==
Wang Xiaolong would play for the Dalian Shide youth team before being promoted to their reserve team Dalian Shide Siwu who were allowed to play as satellite team in the 2008 Singapore League. He would make his debut on 2 August 2008 in a league game against Albirex Niigata (S) in a 2-2 draw. He would not be promoted to the Dalian senior team and joined third tier football club Chongqing. This would be followed by joining Guizhou Hengfeng where he was part of the team that won the 2012 China League Two division. Guizhou allowed him to join Lijiang Jiayunhao before he went on to join second tier club Hebei China Fortune, however he did not make any appearances for them and joined fourth tier club Shaanxi Chang'an Athletic. Shaanxi Chang'an Athletic finished the runners-up in the national finals after losing Dalian Boyang in the penalty shoot-out but won promotion to 2017 China League Two. The team gained a third place position in the 2018 China League Two campaign, though losing to Meizhou Meixian Techand F.C. in the relegation play-offs, the team was promoted to the China League One due to the financial problem of the Yanbian Funde

== Career statistics ==
Statistics accurate as of match played 31 December 2020.

| Club | Season | League | | | National Cup | | League Cup | | Continental | | Total | |
| Club | Season | Division | Apps | Goals | Apps | Goals | Apps | Goals | Apps | Goals | Apps | Goals |
|---|---|---|---|---|---|---|---|---|---|---|---|---|
| Dalian Shide Siwu FC | 2008 | S.League | 10 | 0 | 0 | 0 | 0 | 0 | - | | 10 | 0 |
| Chongqing FC | 2011 | China League Two | 0 | 0 | – | | – | | – | | 0 | 0 |
| Guizhou Hengfeng | 2012 | China League Two | 27 | 2 | 0 | 0 | – | | – | | 27 | 2 |
| Lijiang Jiayunhao | 2013 | China League Two | 12 | 1 | 0 | 0 | – | | – | | 12 | 1 |
| Lijiang Jiayunhao | 2014 | China League Two | 13 | 0 | 0 | 0 | – | | – | | 13 | 0 |
| Lijiang Jiayunhao | Total | | 25 | 1 | 0 | 0 | 0 | 0 | 0 | 0 | 25 | 1 |
| Hebei China Fortune | 2015 | China League One | 0 | 0 | 0 | 0 | – | | – | | 0 | 0 |
| Shaanxi Chang'an Athletic | 2016 | CAL | – | | – | | – | | – | | - | - |
| Shaanxi Chang'an Athletic | 2017 | China League Two | 20 | 3 | 2 | 0 | – | | – | | 22 | 3 |
| Shaanxi Chang'an Athletic | 2018 | China League Two | 18 | 0 | 2 | 0 | – | | – | | 20 | 0 |
| Shaanxi Chang'an Athletic | 2019 | China League One | 4 | 0 | 2 | 1 | – | | – | | 6 | 1 |
| Shaanxi Chang'an Athletic | 2020 | China League One | 0 | 0 | - | | – | | – | | 0 | 0 |
| Shaanxi Chang'an Athletic | Total | | 42 | 3 | 6 | 1 | 0 | 0 | 0 | 0 | 48 | 4 |
| Career total | | | 104 | 6 | 6 | 1 | 0 | 0 | 0 | 0 | 110 | 7 |

== Honours ==
=== Club ===
Guizhou Hengfeng

- China League Two: 2012
