= Bi Jinhao =

Chinese footballer (born 1991)

Bi Jinhao 毕津浩
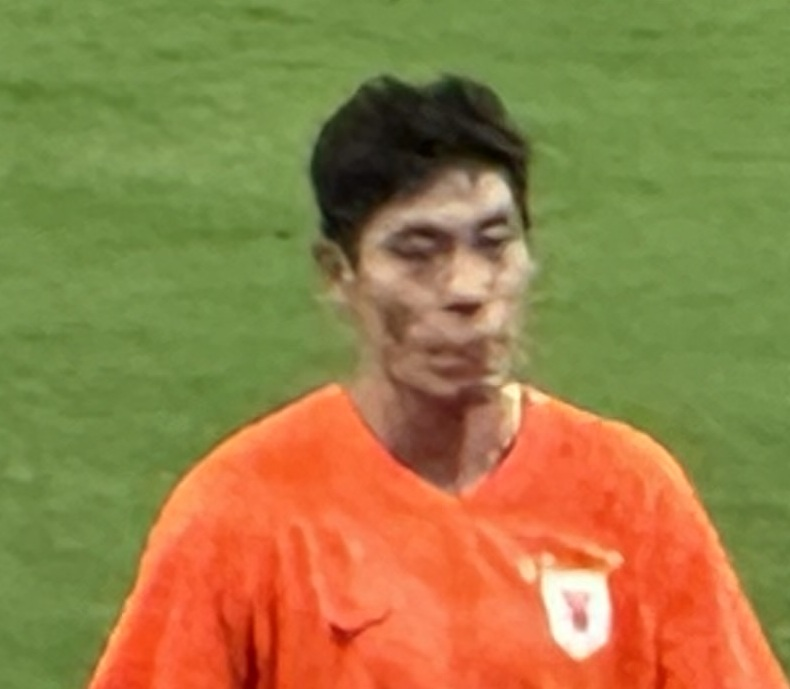
- Bi Jinhao in August 2024

Personal information
- Date of birth: 5 January 1991 (age 35)
- Place of birth: Dalian, Liaoning, China
- Height: 1.92 m (6 ft 3 1/2 in)
- Positions: Forward; centre-back

Team information
- Current team: Dalian Yingbo
- Number: 24

Youth career
- 2006–2010: Dalian Shide
- 2010–2011: Boavista

Senior career*
| Years | Team | Apps | (Gls) |
| 2008 | Dalian Shide Siwu | 19 | (5) |
| 2011 | Leça | 8 | (1) |
| 2011–2015 | Henan Jianye | 55 | (6) |
| 2016–2022 | Shanghai Shenhua | 65 | (6) |
| 2023 | Changchun Yatai | 16 | (0) |
| 2024–2025 | Shandong Taishan | 15 | (1) |
| 2025 | → Dalian Yingbo (loan) | 9 | (1) |
| 2026– | Dalian Yingbo | 22 | (0) |

International career^{‡}
| 2009–2010 | China U19 | | |
| 2012 | China U22 | | |
| 2015 | China | 1 | (0) |
- * Club domestic league appearances and goals as of 19 November 2026 ‡ National team caps and goals as of 31 October 2016

Bi Jinhao (Chinese: 毕津浩; born 5 January 1991) is a professional Chinese football player who currently plays for Dalian Yingbo in the Chinese Super League.

== Club career ==
Born in Dalian, Bi joined Dalian Shide's youth academy when he was still a schoolboy, where he initially started his career as a forward. At his time with their youth academy he was sent out to Dalian Shide's satellite team Dalian Shide Siwu, who played as a foreign team in Singapore's S.League in the 2008 league season.

=== Stints in Portugal ===
Upon his return to Dalian Shide, he was unable to break into the senior team and moved abroad to Portugal's Segunda Divisão side, Boavista in 2010 as a youth player. He joined Terceira Divisão club Leça FC in January 2011 and he would make his debut on 22 January in a 1-1 draw against GD Joane, which was then followed by his first goal for club on 20 February in a 2-1 victory against CD Candal.

=== Return to China ===
Bi returned to China in the summer of 2011 and sought a trial with Chinese Super League side Henan Jianye in July, where despite an unimpressive trial the management still decided to offer him a contract believing he had potential as a future prospect. Throughout the rest of the season Bi was included in the club's reserve team until the following season he was included in the senior team where he made his début on 13 May 2012, in a 2-1 away defeat against Guangzhou R&F where he also scored his first goal for the club. Despite his goalscoring debut he was unable to score in any of his following outings as the club suffered relegation to the second tier at the end of the 2012 campaign. Despite being part of the squad that won immediate promotion back into the top tier the next season Bi still failed to establish himself as a centre forward, scoring one goal throughout the campaign and none in the following 2014 Chinese Super League campaign. The club's manager Jia Xiuquan decided transition Bi into a centre back, which seemed to transform the player as he established himself at the heart of the club's defence and helped guide them to fifth within the league at the end of the 2015 league season, which resulted in selection for the Chinese national team in August 2015.

On 15 January 2016, Bi transferred to fellow Chinese Super League side Shanghai Shenhua. He made his debut for the club in a league game against Yanbian Funde F.C. on 5 March 2016, which resulted in a 1-1 draw. Despite a slow start to his career at the club he would start to establish himself as a regular within the team and he extended his contract with the club for five years on 19 November 2017. He would repay the club by going on to win the 2017 Chinese FA Cup against local rivals Shanghai SIPG. Bi suffered from subarachnoid hemorrhage on 11 April 2018. After a year out of the game Bi would return on 10 March 2019 in a league game against Hebei China Fortune F.C. in a 2-1 defeat. As the season progressed he gradually started to become a regular within the team again and go on to win the 2019 Chinese FA Cup with the club.

On 22 July 2025, Bi was loaned out to Dalian Yingbo.

== International career ==
Bi made his debut for the Chinese national team on 17 November 2015 in a 0-0 draw against Hong Kong in the 2018 FIFA World Cup qualification, coming on as a substitute for Wu Lei in the 81st minute.

== Career statistics ==
Statistics accurate as of match played 1 January 2026.

Appearances and goals by club, season and competition
| Club | Season | League | | | National Cup | | League Cup | | Continental | | Other | | Total | |
| Club | Season | Division | Apps | Goals | Apps | Goals | Apps | Goals | Apps | Goals | Apps | Goals | Apps | Goals |
|---|---|---|---|---|---|---|---|---|---|---|---|---|---|---|
| Dalian Shide Siwu FC | 2008 | S.League | 19 | 5 | 1 | 1 | 0 | 0 | - | | - | | 20 | 6 |
| Leça F.C. | 2010-11 | Terceira Divisão | 8 | 1 | 0 | 0 | - | | - | | - | | 8 | 1 |
| Henan Jianye | 2011 | Chinese Super League | 0 | 0 | 0 | 0 | - | | - | | - | | 0 | 0 |
| Henan Jianye | 2012 | Chinese Super League | 6 | 1 | 1 | 0 | - | | - | | - | | 7 | 1 |
| Henan Jianye | 2013 | China League One | 12 | 1 | 2 | 0 | - | | - | | - | | 14 | 1 |
| Henan Jianye | 2014 | Chinese Super League | 7 | 0 | 0 | 0 | - | | - | | - | | 7 | 0 |
| Henan Jianye | 2015 | Chinese Super League | 30 | 4 | 3 | 1 | - | | - | | - | | 33 | 5 |
| Henan Jianye | Total | | 55 | 6 | 6 | 1 | 0 | 0 | 0 | 0 | 0 | 0 | 61 | 7 |
| Shanghai Shenhua | 2016 | Chinese Super League | 6 | 0 | 2 | 0 | - | | - | | - | | 8 | 0 |
| Shanghai Shenhua | 2017 | Chinese Super League | 18 | 0 | 6 | 0 | - | | 0 | 0 | - | | 24 | 0 |
| Shanghai Shenhua | 2018 | Chinese Super League | 0 | 0 | 0 | 0 | - | | 1 | 0 | 1 (Note: Appearances in Chinese FA Super Cup) | 0 | 2 | 0 |
| Shanghai Shenhua | 2019 | Chinese Super League | 8 | 0 | 4 | 1 | - | | - | | - | | 12 | 1 |
| Shanghai Shenhua | 2020 | Chinese Super League | 12 | 4 | 1 | 0 | - | | 6 | 1 | - | | 19 | 5 |
| Shanghai Shenhua | 2021 | Chinese Super League | 13 | 1 | 4 | 0 | - | | - | | - | | 17 | 1 |
| Shanghai Shenhua | 2022 | Chinese Super League | 8 | 1 | 0 | 0 | - | | - | | - | | 8 | 1 |
| Shanghai Shenhua | Total | | 65 | 6 | 17 | 1 | 0 | 0 | 7 | 1 | 1 | 0 | 90 | 8 |
| Changchun Yatai | 2023 | Chinese Super League | 16 | 0 | 1 | 0 | - | | - | | - | | 17 | 0 |
| Shandong Taishan | 2024 | Chinese Super League | 10 | 1 | 4 | 1 | - | | 2 | 0 | - | | 16 | 2 |
| Shandong Taishan | 2025 | Chinese Super League | 5 | 0 | 1 | 0 | - | | 4 | 2 | - | | 10 | 2 |
| Shandong Taishan | Total | | 15 | 1 | 5 | 1 | 0 | 0 | 6 | 2 | 0 | 0 | 26 | 4 |
| Dalian Yingbo (loan) | 2025 | Chinese Super League | 9 | 1 | 0 | 0 | - | | - | | - | | 9 | 1 |
| Career total | | | 187 | 20 | 30 | 4 | 0 | 0 | 13 | 3 | 1 | 0 | 231 | 27 |

== Honours ==
=== Club ===
Henan Jianye

- China League One: 2013

Shanghai Shenhua

- Chinese FA Cup: 2017, 2019

Dalian Yingbo

- Chinese Super League: 2026
