= Wang Guoming =

Chinese footballer

Wang Guoming 王国明
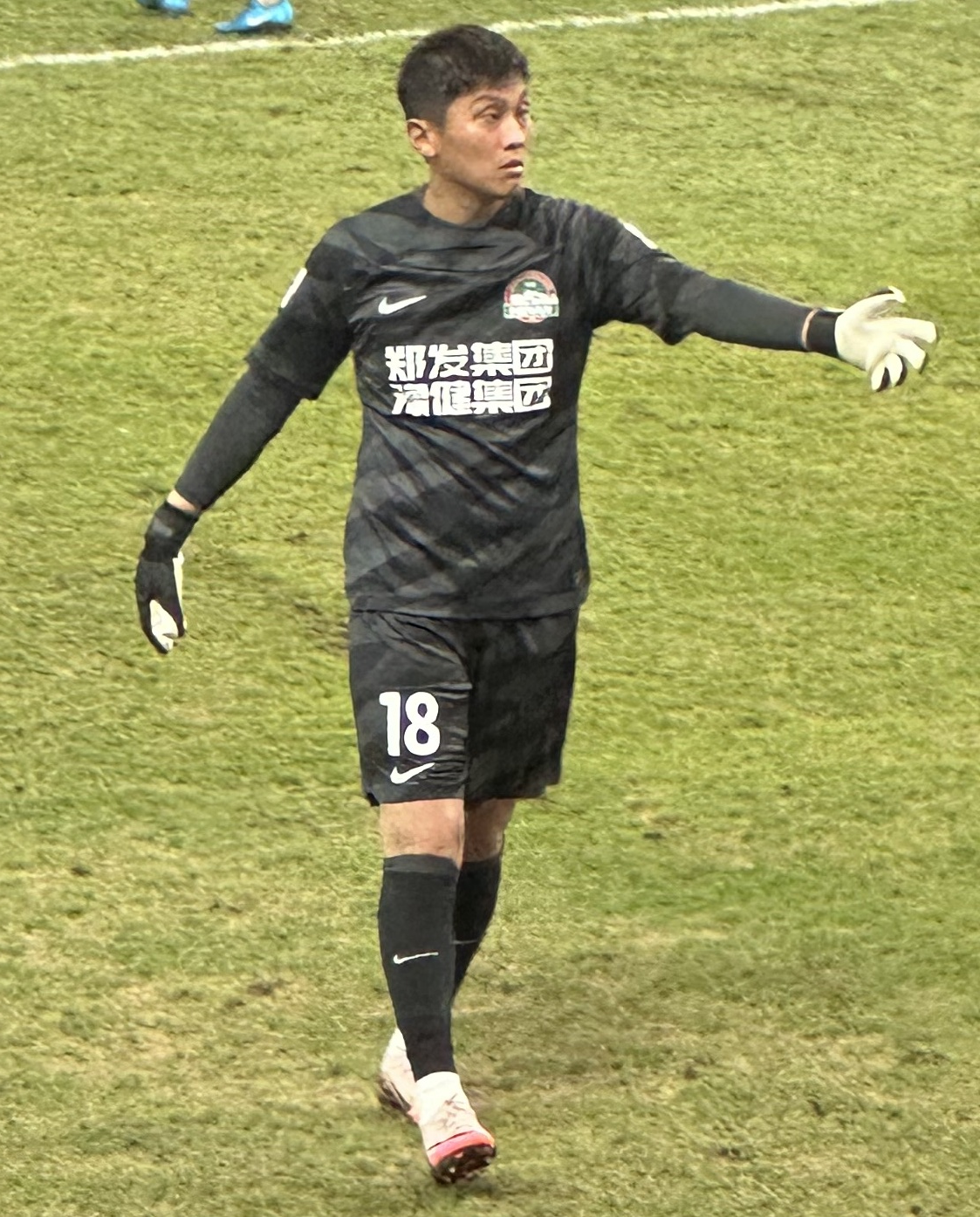
- Wang in August 2024

Personal information
- Date of birth: 2 February 1990 (age 36)
- Place of birth: Dalian, Liaoning, China
- Height: 1.87 m (6 ft 1 1/2 in)
- Position: Goalkeeper

Team information
- Current team: Henan FC
- Number: 18

Youth career
- 2003–2010: Dalian Shide

Senior career*
Years	Team	Apps	(Gls)
2008	Dalian Shide Siwu Singapore	30	(0)
2010–2011	Dalian Shide	0	(0)
2011	→ Fujian Smart Hero (loan)	25	(0)
2012–2015	Shijiazhuang Ever Bright	96	(0)
2016–	Henan FC	153	(0)
- * Club domestic league appearances and goals as of 22 November 2026

Wang Guoming (Chinese: 王国明; pinyin: Wáng Guómíng; born 2 February 1990) is a Chinese footballer who plays as a goalkeeper for Chinese Super League side Henan.

== Club career ==
=== Dalian Shide ===
Wang Guoming joined Dalian Shide's youth team at the age of 13 in 2003. At his time with their youth academy he was sent out to Dalian Shide's satellite team Dalian Shide Siwu, who played as a foreign team in Singapore's S.League in the 2008 league season. While in the Singapore league he was the team's first choice goalkeeper as he helped guide the team to a tenth-place finish at the end of the season. Upon his return he was promoted to Dalian Shide's first team squad in the summer of 2010.

=== Fujian Smart Hero/Shijiazhuang Ever Bright ===
He was loaned to China League Two club Fujian Smart Hero for one year in 2011. He transferred to Fujian Smart Hero in 2012 after helping the club promote to China League One. He played as the first choice goalkeeper of the club and followed the club to move to Shijiazhuang in 2013. After impressive performance in 2014 season, which made him the best goalkeeper of 2014 China League One, he finally returned to Chinese Super League in 2015. On 9 March 2015, Wang made his Super League debut in the season's first match which Shijiazhuang lost to Guangzhou Evergrande 2–1. Wang was the first choice goalkeeper at the beginning of the season; however, he lost his position to Guan Zhen after May 2015.

=== Henan Jianye ===
On 26 February 2016, Wang transferred to fellow Chinese Super League side Henan Jianye (now known as Henan). He made his debut for Henan in a league game on 5 March 2016 in a 1–0 home win against Shanghai SIPG. He was than picked as the club first choice goalkeeper for the 2021 Chinese Super League season onwards.

== Career statistics ==
Statistics accurate as of match played 22 November 2025.

Appearances and goals by club, season and competition
Club	Season	League			National Cup		League Cup		Continental		Total	
Club	Season	Division	Apps	Goals	Apps	Goals	Apps	Goals	Apps	Goals	Apps	Goals
Dalian Shide Siwu FC	2008	S.League	30	0	1	0	1	0	-		32	0
Dalian Shide	2010	Chinese Super League	0	0	-		-		-		0	0
Fujian Smart Hero (loan)	2011	China League Two	25	0	-		-		-		25	0
Shijiazhuang Ever Bright	2012	China League One	29	0	0	0	-		-		29	0
Shijiazhuang Ever Bright	2013	China League One	30	0	1	0	-		-		31	0
Shijiazhuang Ever Bright	2014	China League One	30	0	0	0	-		-		22	2
Shijiazhuang Ever Bright	2015	Chinese Super League	7	0	0	0	-		-		7	0
Shijiazhuang Ever Bright	Total		96	0	1	0	0	0	0	0	97	0
Henan Jianye/ Henan Songshan Longmen/ Henan	2016	Chinese Super League	10	0	1	0	-		-		11	0
Henan Jianye/ Henan Songshan Longmen/ Henan	2017	Chinese Super League	0	0	2	0	-		-		2	0
Henan Jianye/ Henan Songshan Longmen/ Henan	2018	Chinese Super League	1	0	0	0	-		-		1	0
Henan Jianye/ Henan Songshan Longmen/ Henan	2019	Chinese Super League	1	0	1	0	-		-		2	0
Henan Jianye/ Henan Songshan Longmen/ Henan	2020	Chinese Super League	3	0	1	0	-		-		4	0
Henan Jianye/ Henan Songshan Longmen/ Henan	2021	Chinese Super League	17	0	6	0	-		-		23	0
Henan Jianye/ Henan Songshan Longmen/ Henan	2022	Chinese Super League	29	0	0	0	-		-		29	0
Henan Jianye/ Henan Songshan Longmen/ Henan	2023	Chinese Super League	28	0	0	0	-		-		28	0
Henan Jianye/ Henan Songshan Longmen/ Henan	2024	Chinese Super League	15	0	3	0	-		-		18	0
Henan Jianye/ Henan Songshan Longmen/ Henan	2025	Chinese Super League	27	0	2	0	-		-		29	0
Henan Jianye/ Henan Songshan Longmen/ Henan	Total		131	0	16	0	0	0	0	0	147	0
Career total			282	0	18	0	1	0	0	0	301	0
