= Guo Wei (footballer) =

Chinese association football player

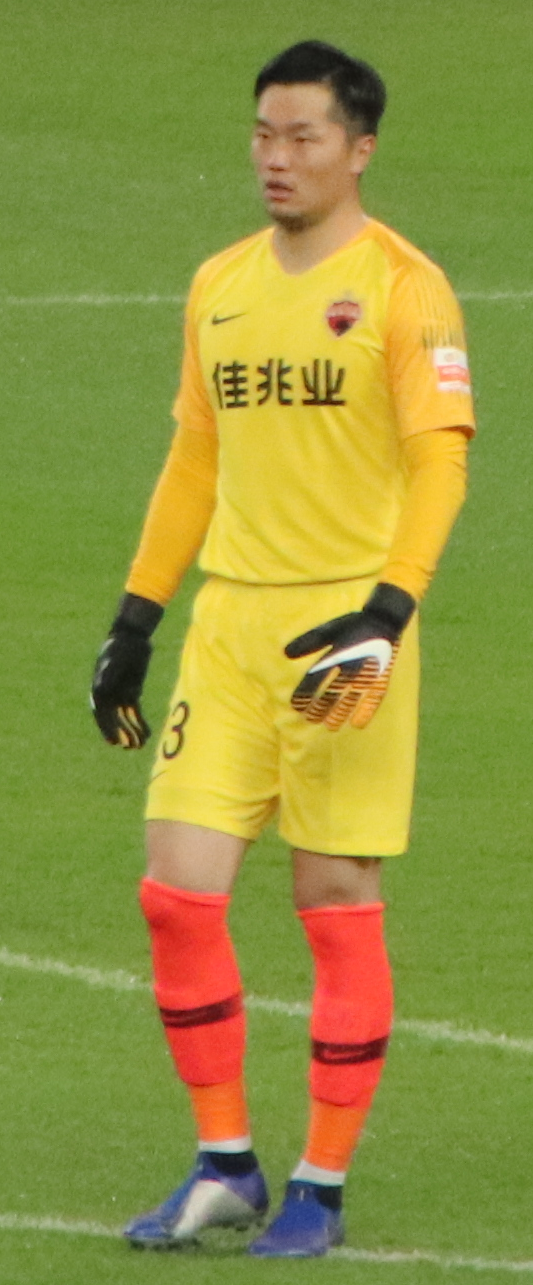
- Guo Wei on the field

Personal information
- Date of birth: 8 July 1989 (age 37)
- Place of birth: Dalian, Liaoning, China
- Height: 1.91 m (6 ft 3 in)
- Position: Goalkeeper

Youth career
- 2004–2010: Dalian Shide

Senior career*
Years	Team	Apps	(Gls)
2008	Dalian Shide Siwu	3	(0)
2010	Dalian Shide	0	(0)
2010	→ Beijing Baxy (loan)	19	(0)
2011–2013	Chongqing FC	62	(0)
2014–2016	Dalian Transcendence	57	(0)
2017–2018	Shanghai Shenxin	60	(0)
2019–2022	Shenzhen FC	46	(0)
Total		247	(0)
- * Club domestic league appearances and goals

Guo Wei (simplified Chinese: 国威; traditional Chinese: 國威; pinyin: Guó Wēi; born 8 July 1989) is a Chinese former footballer who played as a goalkeeper

== Club career ==
Guo Wei would play for the Dalian Shide youth team and was sent out to their satellite team Dalian Shide Siwu, who played as a foreign team in Singapore's S.League in the 2008 league season before going on loan to second-tier club Beijing Baxy&Shengshi at the start of the 2010 China League One season. After returning from his loan period Dalian allowed him to leave for third tier club Chongqing FC who in his debut season would establish himself as a regular as the team gained promotion after coming runners-up within the 2011 China League Two league season. The club would remain within the China League One until they were relegated at the end of the 2013 league season and disbanded.

Guo would join third tier football club Dalian Transcendence and by the 2015 China League Two season go on to gain promotion after coming runners-up at the end of the campaign. He would go on to be an integral member of the team as he ensured the club remained within the second tier at the end of the 2016 China League One season. This was followed by a move to another China League One club in Shanghai Shenxin on 6 March 2017. After being an integral member of the Shanghai Shenxin team for two seasons, newly promoted team to the top tier Shenzhen FC signed Guo on 26 February 2019.

On 29 January 2026, Guo was given a lifetime ban for match-fixing by the Chinese Football Association.

== Career statistics ==
Appearances and goals by club, season and competition
Club	Season	League			Cup		Continental		Other		Total	
Club	Season	Division	Apps	Goals	Apps	Goals	Apps	Goals	Apps	Goals	Apps	Goals
Dalian Shide Siwu FC	2008	S.League	3	0	0	0	–		-		3	0
Dalian Shide	2010	Chinese Super League	0	0	-		-		-		0	0
Beijing Baxy (loan)	2010	China League One	19	0	–		–		–		19	0
Chongqing FC	2011	China League Two	20	0	–		–		–		20	0
Chongqing FC	2012	China League One	22	0	0	0	–		–		22	0
Chongqing FC	2013	China League One	20	0	0	0	–		–		20	0
Chongqing FC	Total		62	0	0	0	0	0	0	0	62	0
Dalian Transcendence	2014	China League Two	14	0	2	0	–		–		16	0
Dalian Transcendence	2015	China League Two	18	0	3	0	–		–		21	0
Dalian Transcendence	2016	China League One	25	0	0	0	–		–		25	0
Dalian Transcendence	Total		57	0	5	0	0	0	0	0	62	0
Shanghai Shenxin	2017	China League One	30	0	3	0	–		–		33	0
Shanghai Shenxin	2018	China League One	30	0	1	0	–		–		31	0
Shanghai Shenxin	Total		60	0	4	0	0	0	0	0	64	0
Shenzhen FC	2019	Chinese Super League	30	0	0	0	–		–		30	0
Shenzhen FC	2020	Chinese Super League	16	0	1	0	–		–		17	0
Shenzhen FC	2021	Chinese Super League	0	0	1	0	–		–		1	0
Shenzhen FC	Total		46	0	2	0	0	0	0	0	48	0
Career total			247	0	11	0	0	0	0	0	258	0
