= Sun Wenlong =

Chinese association football player

Personal information
- Date of birth: 21 February 1989 (age 37)
- Height: 1.87 m (6 ft 2 in)
- Position: Defender

Youth career
- Dalian Shide

Senior career*
Years	Team	Apps	(Gls)
2008	Dalian Shide Siwu		
2016	Hubei Huachuang		
2016–2017	Suzhou Zhongyuan		
2018	Fujian Tianxin		
2018–2019	Shenzhen Pengcheng	14	(0)
- * Club domestic league appearances and goals

Sun Wenlong (Chinese: 孙文龙; born 21 February 1989) is a Chinese former footballer.

== Career statistics ==
=== Club ===
Club	Season	League			Cup		Continental		Other		Total	
Club	Season	Division	Apps	Goals	Apps	Goals	Apps	Goals	Apps	Goals	Apps	Goals
Hubei Huachuang	2016	CMCL	–		2 (Note: Appearances in the Chinese FA Cup)	0	–		–		2	0
Suzhou Zhongyuan	2016	–			1	0	–		–		1	0
Shaanxi Chang'an Athletic	2018	China League Two	14	0	0	0	–		1 (Note: Appearances in the China League Two playoffs)	0	15	0
Shaanxi Chang'an Athletic	2019	China League Two	0	0	2	0	–		0	0	2	0
Shaanxi Chang'an Athletic	Total		14	0	2	0	0	0	1	0	17	0
Career total			14	0	5	0	0	0	1	0	20	0
