= Chi Jinyu =

Chinese association football player

Personal information
- Date of birth: 16 January 1989 (age 37)
- Height: 1.83 m (6 ft 0 in)
- Position: Defender

Youth career
- –2011: Dalian Shide

Senior career*
Years	Team	Apps	(Gls)
2008	Dalian Shide Siwu		(1)
2012	Jiangxi Liansheng		
2013–2015	Qingdao Huanghai		
- * Club domestic league appearances and goals

Chi Jinyu (simplified Chinese: 迟金玉; traditional Chinese: 遲金玉; pinyin: Chí Jīnyù; born 16 January 1989) is a Chinese former footballer.
