= Dalian Shide Siwu FC =

Dalian Shide Siwu 大连实德四五队
- Full name: Dalian Shide Siwu Football Club 大连实德四五队
- Founded: 2008
- Dissolved: 2008
- Ground: Queenstown Stadium; Queenstown, Singapore
- Capacity: 5,000
- League: S.League
- 2008: S.League, 10th of 12

Dalian Shide Siwu Football Club (Chinese: 大连实德四五队) was a Chinese professional football club which was formed to play as a foreign team in Singapore's S.League in 2008.

== History ==
The club was a satellite team of the Chinese Super League club Dalian Shide. Players from Dalian Shide's reserve and youth team made up the majority of its S.League squad.

The team played their home games at the Queenstown Stadium.

As part of a sponsorship deal with Trump Dragon Distillers, Dalian Shide's Singapore team took on the name Dalian Shide Siwu.

In 2008, the club took over Liaoning Guangyuan's position in the S.League. The club aimed for a top-six finish in their first season in 2008 and also targeted for the league title by 2010.

In 2009, the Football Association of Singapore has decided not to invite them to participate in the S.League again, they were replaced by Brunei DPMM.

== 2008 Squad ==
Note: Flags indicate national team as defined under FIFA eligibility rules; some limited exceptions apply. Players may hold more than one non-FIFA nationality.

No.	Pos.	Nation	Player
1	GK	CHN	Wang Guoming
2	DF	CHN	Zheng Jianfeng
3	DF	CHN	Jiang Jihong
5	DF	CHN	Ye Shaonan
6	MF	CHN	Chi Jinyu
7	MF	CHN	Quan Heng
8	MF	CHN	Lü Peng
9	DF	CHN	Wang Liang
10	MF	CHN	Wang Xiaolong
11	DF	CHN	Zhao Honglüe
12	FW	CHN	Sun Wenlong
13	DF	CHN	Wang Dongqing

No.	Pos.	Nation	Player
14	MF	CHN	Xue Ya'nan
15	DF	CHN	Liu Yusheng
16	MF	CHN	Liu Yulong
17	MF	CHN	Li Yunting
18	MF	CHN	Ni Yusong
19	FW	CHN	Zhang Depeng
20	FW	CHN	Bi Jinhao
21	GK	CHN	Mu Xiaochen
22	GK	CHN	Guo Wei
24	DF	CHN	Hui Yi
25	FW	CHN	Sheng Jun

== Former technical staff ==
- (China) Team Manager: Liu Jiang Wei
- (China) Head Coach: Pei Yong Jin

== Notable players ==
Notable players that plays in the Chinese Super League or the national team.

- (China) Wang Guoming
- (China) Zheng Jianfeng
- (China) Jiang Jihong
- (China) Lü Peng
- (China) Wang Liang
- (China) Zhao Honglüe
- (China) Xue Ya'nan
- (China) Ni Yusong
- (China) Bi Jinhao
- (China) Guo Wei

== Seasons ==
As of the end of 2008 season

Season	Pos	P	W	D	L	F	A	Pts	Singapore Cup	Singapore League Cup
2008	10th	33	5	7	21	26	75	22	Preliminary	Preliminary

== Sponsors ==
- Main Sponsor: Trump Dragon Distillers
- Kit Supplier: Adidas
