= Shide Group =

Shide Group is a development, media and energy corporation based in Dalian, China.

== History ==
Founded in 2002, Shide Group was also the owner of Dalian Shide, an association football club. For a time, Shide Group also owned other football clubs such as Sichuan First City and Dalian Sidelong.

== See also ==
- Advanced materials industry in China
