= Shiden =

Shiden (紫電) may refer to:

== Military ==
- a World War II Japanese seaplane fighter aircraft, the Kawanishi N1K-J

== Vehicles ==
- Mooncraft Shiden 77, a 1977 Japanese race car
- Mooncraft Shiden MC/RT-16, the Mooncraft/Riley, a Japanese 2006 Super GT racer
