= Wen Huyi =

Chinese footballer

Wen Huyi 문호일 文虎一
Personal information
- Full name: Wen Huyi
- Date of birth: 11 May 1983 (age 43)
- Place of birth: Yanbian, Jilin, China
- Height: 1.75 m (5 ft 9 in)
- Positions: Striker; midfielder

Youth career
- 1999–2000: Jilin Aodong

Senior career*
| Years | Team | Apps | (Gls) |
| 2001–2006 | Yanbian FC | | |
| 2007–2010 | Changsha Ginde | 106 | (17) |
| 2011 | Shanghai Shenhua | 21 | (0) |
| 2012–2014 | Shenyang Shenbei | 67 | (1) |
| 2015 | Yanbian Changbaishan | 0 | (0) |

Managerial career
- 2021: Shanghai Shenhua (assistant)
- 2023–2025: Shandong Taishan (fitness)
- * Club domestic league appearances and goals as of 1 November 2015 ‡ National team caps and goals as of 1 Jan 2012

Wen Huyi
- Simplified Chinese: 文虎一
Transcriptions
Standard Mandarin
- Hanyu Pinyin: Wén Hǔyī
- IPA: [wə̌n.xù í]

Chinese Korean name
- Chosŏn'gŭl: 문호일
Transcriptions
- Revised Romanization: Mun Hoil
- McCune–Reischauer: Mun Hoil

Wen Huyi (born May 11, 1983) is a Chinese football coach and former footballer as a striker or midfielder.

== Club career ==
=== Yanbian FC ===
Wen Huyi began his football career playing for the Yanbian FC youth team where he graduated to their senior team in the 2001 league season, however this was also the same season which saw Yanbian FC relegated to the third tier. Wen Huyi was one of several youth players who were immediately given their chance of first team football and they would eventually repay the club when they won promotion to the second tier in the 2004 league season. Despite having a personally poor season with the club he was able to help establish the team to a mid-table finish within the second tier, however Wen Huyi started to personally establish himself as the team's top striker during the 2006 league season when he scored twelve league goals and became the league's second top goalscorer.

=== Changsha Ginde ===
After an impressive season for Yanbian FC top tier side Changsha Ginde purchased him for 3.5 million yuan in the 2007 league season. Adjusting to the top tier Wen Huyi wasn't able to replicate his goalscoring success and this saw him often finding himself playing in midfield during the season. Despite rarely playing in his favoured position as a striker Wen Huyi would settle within the team's midfield as an attacking midfielder for the next several seasons, however during his time with the team the club were consistent relegation strugglers and were eventually relegated at the end of the 2010 Chinese Super League campaign.

=== Shanghai Shenhua ===
Wen Huyi's contract would expire at the end of the 2010 league season and Changsha Ginde would allow him to leave for free to Shanghai Shenhua. On March 2, 2011 he would make his debut in a 2011 AFC Champions League game against Kashima Antlers in a 0-0 draw where he came on as a late substitute. Throughout much of the early parts of the season Wen was predominately used as a late substitute and on the rare occasions he did start he was used as an emergency full-back, such as in the 2-1 victory over Henan Construction on April 23, 2011. His limited playing time would not improve as Shenhua struggled within the league and the manager Xi Zhikang was replaced by Dražen Besek half way through the season. By the end of the season Wen was allowed to leave on a free transfer to second tier club Shenyang Shenbei F.C. after his disappointing spell at Shenhua and chance to move to a place closer back home.
