= Kornprom Jaroonpong =

Thai footballer (born 1988)

Personal information
- Full name: Kornprom Jaroonpong
- Date of birth: 12 December 1988 (age 37)
- Place of birth: Surat Thani, Thailand
- Height: 1.72 m (5 ft 7 1/2 in)
- Position: Midfielder

Team information
- Current team: Samut Sakhon
- Number: 27

Youth career
- 2001–2006: Assumption College Thonburi

Senior career*
Years	Team	Apps	(Gls)
2007	Muangthong United	12	(3)
2008	Home United	16	(2)
2009–2010	Raj Pracha	27	(4)
2011–2013	Phuket	33	(3)
2014–2015	PTT Rayong	8	(0)
2015–2017	Ubon UMT United	48	(5)
2018–	Police Tero	1	(0)
2018–	→ Samut Sakhon (loan)		

International career
2009	Thailand U23		
- * Club domestic league appearances and goals

Kornprom Jaroonpong Thai: กรพรหม จรูญพงศ์ (born December 12, 1988), simply known as Poon (Thai: ปูรณ์), is a Thai professional footballer who currently plays for Samut Sakhon in the Thai League 2.

== Club career ==
Year	Club	League
2007	Muangthong United	Thai Division 1 League
2008	Home United	S.League
2009	Raj Pracha	Regional League Division 2
2010	Raj Pracha	Thai Division 1 League
2011-2013	Phuket	Thai Division 1 League
2014	PTT Rayong	Thai League T1
2015	PTT Rayong	Thai Division 1 League
2015	Ubon UMT United	Regional League Division 2
2016	Ubon UMT United	Thai Division 1 League

== Honours ==
Ubon UMT United

- Regional League Division 2
  - Winner : 2015
- Regional League North-East Division
  - Runner-up : 2015
