= Iván Asenjo =

Chilean footballer and manager (born 1982)

Personal information
- Full name: Iván César Asenjo Góngora
- Date of birth: January 16, 1982 (age 44)
- Place of birth: Valdivia, Chile
- Height: 1.75 m (5 ft 9 in)
- Positions: Attacking midfielder; forward

Senior career*
Years	Team	Apps	(Gls)
2000–2002	Deportes Puerto Montt	9	(1)
2003	PSDS Deli Serdang		(2)
2004	PSMS Medan		(0)
2004	Deportes Valdivia		
2005	Barito Putera		(3)
2006	Persim Maros		(5)
2007	Johor Pasir Gudang		(3)
2008	Sengkang Punggol		(1)

Managerial career
- 2012: Deportes Valdivia (fitness coach)
- 2013: Municipal La Pintana (assistant)
- 2014–2015: Deportes La Pintana (assistant)
- 2015–2016: Deportes Pintana (assistant)
- 2016–2017: Deportes Pintana
- 2017–2018: Deportes Valdivia (youth)
- 2019: Deportes Valdivia (assistant)
- * Club domestic league appearances and goals

Iván César Asenjo Góngora (born January 16, 1982) is a Chilean former soccer player and soccer manager.

== Playing career ==
He started his career in Deportes Puerto Montt, before moving to PSDS Deli Serdang in Indonesia in 2003. He played for several different poor clubs in Indonesia for four years before he was signed by Malaysian Premier League, second division side Johor Pasir Gudang in 2007. He also had a stint with Deportes Valdivia in 2004 in the Tercera División de Chile.

== Managerial career ==
As a football coach, he has worked as assistant of Cristian Muñoz in Municipal La Pintana, later Deportes La Pintana and Deportes Pintana, as well as the head coach of the same team in the 2016–17 season. After he worked in the Deportes Valdivia youth system and was the assistant of Jürgen Press in 2019.

As a fitness coach, he worked for Deportes Valdivia in 2012.

In 2021, he assumed as Sport Director of Deportes Valdivia.
