= Zhao Honglüe =

Chinese footballer

Zhao Honglüe 赵宏略
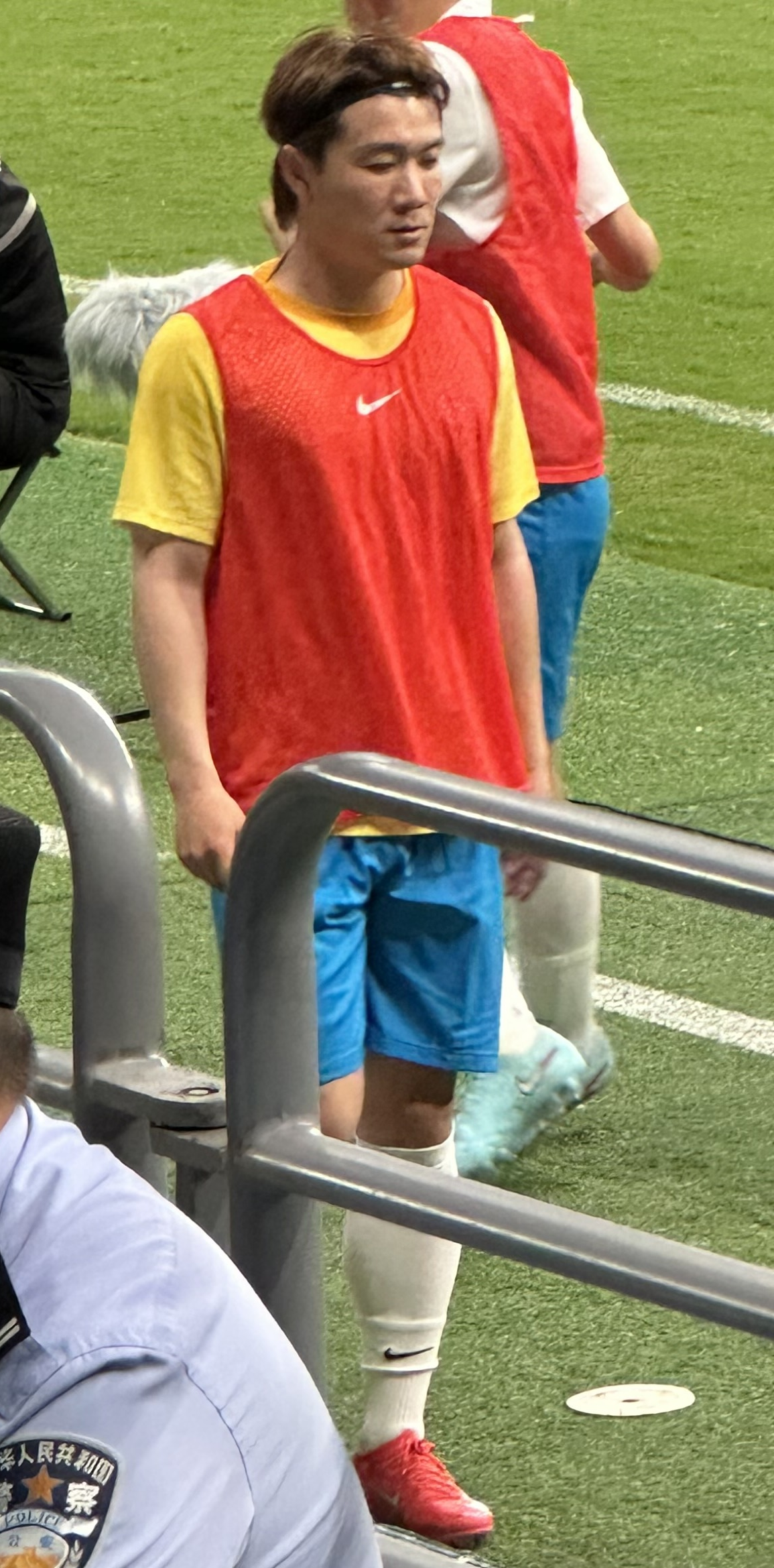
- Zhao Honglüe in June 2025

Personal information
- Full name: Zhao Honglüe
- Date of birth: December 4, 1989 (age 36)
- Place of birth: Dalian, Liaoning, China
- Height: 1.78 m (5 ft 10 in)
- Positions: Left-back; right winger

Team information
- Current team: Qingdao West Coast
- Number: 3

Youth career
- 2006–2008: Dalian Shide

Senior career*
Years	Team	Apps	(Gls)
2008	Dalian Shide Singapore	28	(3)
2009–2013	Dalian Shide	92	(1)
2013–2015	Dalian Aerbin	25	(0)
2015–2020	Tianjin Teda	90	(2)
2021	Wuhan FC	17	(4)
2022	Henan Songshan Longmen	10	(0)
2023	Cangzhou Mighty Lions	23	(0)
2024–	Qingdao West Coast	47	(0)
- * Club domestic league appearances and goals as of 19 November 2026

Zhao Honglüe (simplified Chinese: 赵宏略; traditional Chinese: 趙宏略; pinyin: Zhào Hóng'è) is a professional Chinese footballer who currently plays for Qingdao West Coast as a right-footed left-back or right winger in the Chinese Super League.

== Club career ==
Zhao Honglüe would start his football career playing for the various Dalian Shide F.C. youth teams before he was loaned out to the team's youth team called Dalian Shide Siwu FC that was allowed to take part in Singapore's 2008 S.League. Upon his return to Dalian Shide at the beginning of the 2009 Chinese Super League Zhao would make his debut for the team in the club's first game of the season as a late substitute on March 22, 2009 in a 4-1 defeat to Tianjin Teda. After the game Zhao would go on to become a vital member of the team as the club gained mid-table positions for the next several seasons, eventually going on to score his first league goal for them on April 28, 2012 in a 1-1 draw against Hangzhou Greentown.

On 26 February 2015, Zhao transferred to fellow Chinese Super League side Tianjin Teda. The Head coach Jaime Pacheco would convert Zhao from a midfielder to a left-back before Zhao made his debut for the club on 8 March 2015 in a league game against Henan Jianye F.C. in a 3-1 defeat. He would gradually start to establish himself as an integral member of the team and go on to score his first goal for the club on 2 August 2020, in a league game against Chongqing Dangdai Lifan in a 2-2 draw.

After six seasons at Tianjin he would join fellow top tier club Wuhan for the start of the 2021 Chinese Super League campaign on 26 February 2021. He would go on to make his debut for the club in a league game on 23 April 2021 against Hebei in 1-1 draw. After only one season he would join another top tier club in Henan Songshan Longmen on 26 April 2022. This would be followed by his debut appearance for the club on 4 June 2022 in a league game against Dalian Professional in a 2-2 draw. Zhao would be on the move again when he joined top tier club Cangzhou Mighty Lions on 6 April 2023.

== Career statistics ==
Statistics accurate as of match played 22 November 2025.

Appearances and goals by club, season and competition
Club	Season	League			National Cup		League Cup		Continental		Total	
Club	Season	Division	Apps	Goals	Apps	Goals	Apps	Goals	Apps	Goals	Apps	Goals
Dalian Shide Siwu FC	2008	S.League	28	3	1	0	1	0	–		30	3
Dalian Shide	2009	Chinese Super League	23	0	–		–		–		23	0
Dalian Shide	2010	Chinese Super League	25	0	–		–		–		25	0
Dalian Shide	2011	Chinese Super League	29	0	1	0	–		–		30	0
Dalian Shide	2012	Chinese Super League	20	1	0	0	–		–		20	1
Dalian Shide	Total		97	1	1	0	0	0	0	0	98	1
Dalian Aerbin	2013	Chinese Super League	0	0	0	0	–		–		0	0
Dalian Aerbin	2014	Chinese Super League	25	0	0	0	–		–		25	0
Dalian Aerbin	Total		25	0	0	0	0	0	0	0	25	0
Tianjin Teda	2015	Chinese Super League	8	0	0	0	–		–		8	0
Tianjin Teda	2016	Chinese Super League	0	0	0	0	–		–		0	0
Tianjin Teda	2017	Chinese Super League	19	0	0	0	–		–		19	0
Tianjin Teda	2018	Chinese Super League	24	0	0	0	–		–		24	0
Tianjin Teda	2019	Chinese Super League	26	0	1	0	–		–		27	0
Tianjin Teda	2020	Chinese Super League	13	2	4	0	–		–		17	2
Tianjin Teda	Total		90	2	5	0	0	0	0	0	95	2
Wuhan	2021	Chinese Super League	17	4	3	2	–		–		20	5
Henan Songshan Longmen	2022	Chinese Super League	10	0	0	0	–		–		10	0
Cangzhou Mighty Lions	2023	Chinese Super League	23	0	0	0	–		–		23	0
Qingdao West Coast	2024	Chinese Super League	24	0	1	0	–		–		25	0
Qingdao West Coast	2025	Chinese Super League	21	0	1	0	–		–		22	0
Qingdao West Coast	Total		45	0	2	0	0	0	0	0	47	0
Career total			335	10	12	2	1	0	0	0	348	11
