= Xue Yanan =

Chinese footballer

Xue Yanan 薛亚男
Personal information
- Full name: Xue Yanan
- Date of birth: June 5, 1990 (age 36)
- Place of birth: Dalian, Liaoning, China
- Height: 1.82 m (6 ft 0 in)
- Positions: Defensive midfielder; full-back

Youth career
- 2003–2008: Dalian Shide

Senior career*
Years	Team	Apps	(Gls)
2008	Dalian Shide Singapore	18	(0)
2009–2012	Dalian Shide	43	(0)
2013	Dalian Aerbin	0	(0)
2013	→ Qingdao Hainiu (loan)	17	(4)
2014–2015	Qingdao Hainiu	26	(1)
2016–2017	Dalian Transcendence	39	(3)
2018–2021	Changchun Yatai	34	(1)
2021	→ Hebei Zhuoao (loan)	14	(1)
2021	→ Qingdao Hainiu (loan)	11	(0)
2022-2023	Dalian LFTZ Huayi		
- * Club domestic league appearances and goals as of 23 May 2022

Xue Yanan (simplified Chinese: 薛亚男; traditional Chinese: 薛亞男; pinyin: Xuē Yànán) is a professional Chinese footballer who currently plays as a defensive midfielder or full-back.

== Club career ==
Xue Yanan started his career with Dalian Shide and was loaned out to their youth team called Dalian Shide Siwu FC who were allowed to take part in Singapore's 2008 S.League. Upon his return to Dalian Shide he would be given his chance to make his debut for the team in the last game of the season on October 31, 2009, in a league game against Qingdao Jonoon that Dalian lost 3–1.

On 30 November 2012, Dalian Shide were acquired by Aerbin Group and merged with local rivals Dalian Aerbin With the significantly larger squad in March 2013, Xue transferred to Qingdao Hainiu in the China League Two. His transfer to Qingdao would be successful, and he would secure promotion to the second tier at the conclusion of the season as well as win the division title in his first season with the team.

On 30 January 2016, Xue transferred to his hometown club Dalian Transcendence in the China League One.

On 10 February 2018, Xue transferred to Chinese Super League side Changchun Yatai.

== Career statistics ==
Statistics accurate as of match played 31 December 2020.

Appearances and goals by club, season and competition
Club	Season	League			National Cup		League Cup		Continental		Total	
Club	Season	Division	Apps	Goals	Apps	Goals	Apps	Goals	Apps	Goals	Apps	Goals
Dalian Shide Siwu FC	2008	S.League	18	0	0	0	0	0	-		18	0
Dalian Shide	2009	Chinese Super League	1	0	-		-		-		1	0
Dalian Shide	2010	Chinese Super League	7	0	-		-		-		7	0
Dalian Shide	2011	Chinese Super League	23	0	1	0	-		-		24	0
Dalian Shide	2012	Chinese Super League	12	0	0	0	-		0	0	12	0
Dalian Shide	Total		43	0	1	0	0	0	0	0	44	0
Qingdao Hainiu (loan)	2013	China League Two	17	4	-		-		-		17	4
Qingdao Hainiu	2014	China League One	9	1	1	0	-		-		10	1
Qingdao Hainiu	2015	China League One	17	0	1	0	-		-		18	0
Qingdao Hainiu	Total		26	1	2	0	0	0	0	0	28	0
Dalian Transcendence	2016	China League One	17	1	0	0	-		-		17	1
Dalian Transcendence	2017	China League One	22	2	0	0	-		-		22	2
Dalian Transcendence	Total		39	3	0	0	0	0	0	0	39	3
Changchun Yatai	2018	Chinese Super League	3	0	1	0	-		-		4	0
Changchun Yatai	2019	China League One	27	1	1	0	-		-		28	1
Changchun Yatai	2020	China League One	4	0	2	0	-		-		6	0
Changchun Yatai	Total		34	1	4	0	0	0	0	0	38	1
Career total			177	9	7	0	0	0	0	0	184	9

== Honours ==
=== Club ===
Qingdao Hainiu

- China League Two: 2013

Changchun Yatai

- China League One: 2020
