= Ni Yusong =

Chinese footballer

Ni Yusong 倪玉崧
Personal information
- Full name: Ni Yusong
- Date of birth: January 1, 1991 (age 35)
- Place of birth: Dalian, Liaoning, China
- Height: 1.79 m (5 ft 10 in)
- Position: Midfielder

Senior career*
Years	Team	Apps	(Gls)
2008	Dalian Shide Singapore	15	(2)
2010–2013	Dalian Shide	11	(0)
2013–2018	Liaoning Whowin	55	(3)
2019–2021	Henan Jianye	2	(1)
- * Club domestic league appearances and goals as of 31 December 2022

Ni Yusong (simplified Chinese: 倪玉崧; traditional Chinese: 倪玉嵩; pinyin: Ní Yùsōng) is a professional Chinese footballer who currently plays as a midfielder.

== Club career ==
Ni Yusong started his career with Dalian Shide F.C. and was loaned out to their youth team called Dalian Shide Siwu FC who were allowed to take part in Singapore's 2008 S.League. Upon his return to Dalian Shide he would have to wait until the beginning of the 2011 Chinese Super League before he got his chance to make his debut for the team in a league game against Henan Jianye on May 21, 2011 in a 1-0 victory. At Dalian he would start to become a regular within the squad until at the end of the 2012 Chinese Super League season when the club admitted that they were in financial difficulties and the club was merged with local rivals Dalian Aerbin. Ni would leave to join another top tier club in Liaoning Whowin where he made his debut in a Chinese FA Cup game against Shenyang Shenbei on 22 March 2013 in a game that initially ended in a 1-1 draw, but was won in a penalty shoot-out. On 1 March 2019 Ni joined top tier club Henan Jianye.

== Career statistics ==
As of 31 December 2022.

Appearances and goals by club, season and competition
Club	Season	League			National Cup		League Cup		Continental		Total	
Club	Season	Division	Apps	Goals	Apps	Goals	Apps	Goals	Apps	Goals	Apps	Goals
Dalian Shide Singapore	2008	S.League	15	2	1	0	0	0	-		16	2
Dalian Shide	2010	Chinese Super League	0	0	-		-		-		0	0
Dalian Shide	2011	Chinese Super League	5	0	0	0	-		-		5	0
Dalian Shide	2012	Chinese Super League	6	0	1	0	-		-		7	0
Dalian Shide	Total		11	0	1	0	0	0	0	0	12	0
Liaoning Whowin	2013	Chinese Super League	6	1	2	0	-		-		8	1
Liaoning Whowin	2014	Chinese Super League	8	1	1	0	-		-		9	1
Liaoning Whowin	2015	Chinese Super League	11	1	1	0	-		-		12	1
Liaoning Whowin	2016	Chinese Super League	10	0	2	0	-		-		12	0
Liaoning Whowin	2017	Chinese Super League	14	0	0	0	-		-		14	0
Liaoning Whowin	2018	China League One	6	0	1	0	-		-		7	0
Liaoning Whowin	Total		55	3	7	0	0	0	0	0	62	3
Henan Jianye	2019	Chinese Super League	0	0	0	0	-		-		0	0
Henan Jianye	2020	Chinese Super League	2	1	1	0	-		-		3	1
Henan Jianye	2021	Chinese Super League	0	0	0	0	-		-		0	0
Henan Jianye	Total		2	1	1	0	0	0	0	0	3	1
Career total			83	6	10	0	0	0	0	0	93	6
