= Wang Liang (footballer, born 1989) =

Chinese footballer

Wang Liang 王亮
Personal information
- Full name: Wang Liang
- Date of birth: July 23, 1989 (age 37)
- Place of birth: Dalian, Liaoning, China
- Height: 1.82 m (6 ft 0 in)
- Positions: Full-back; winger

Senior career*
Years	Team	Apps	(Gls)
2008	Dalian Shide Singapore	11	(3)
2009–2012	Dalian Shide	6	(0)
2012	→ Beijing Yitong Kuche (Loan)	15	(3)
2013–2017	Liaoning Whowin	55	(0)
2018–2020	Dalian Yifang	3	(0)
2019	→ Dalian Chanjoy (loan)	18	(2)
2022	Dalian Duxing	0	(0)
- * Club domestic league appearances and goals as of 31 December 2022

Wang Liang (Chinese: 王亮; pinyin: Wáng Liàng) is a Chinese former professional footballer who played as a full-back or winger.

== Club career ==
Wang Liang started his career with Dalian Shide and was loaned out to their youth team called Dalian Shide Siwu FC who were allowed to take part in Singapore's 2008 S.League. Upon his return to Dalian Shide at the beginning of the 2009 Chinese Super League Wang Liang would make his debut for the team in the club's first game of the season as a late substitute on March 22, 2009, in a 4–1 defeat to Tianjin Teda. After the game he would then become a squad player for the next several seasons until half-way through the 2012 Chinese league season he would go on loan third-tier club Beijing Yitong Kuche until the end of the season.

On 28 February 2018, Wang transferred to Chinese Super League side Dalian Yifang. After lost one match in Dalian Yifang, Wang was found in Dalian famous bath center "高深会馆", and leave really bad influence to fans and club. People gave him a nickname: “澡亮”. Next day, Wang was put on the bench and never get opportunity to play until the end of the season. On 28 February 2019, Wang was loaned to League Two side Dalian Chanjoy for the 2019 season.

== Career statistics ==
Statistics accurate as of match played 31 December 2022.

Appearances and goals by club, season and competition
Club	Season	League			National Cup		League Cup		Continental		Total	
Club	Season	Division	Apps	Goals	Apps	Goals	Apps	Goals	Apps	Goals	Apps	Goals
Dalian Shide Siwu FC	2008	S.League	11	3	0	0	1	0	-		12	3
Dalian Shide	2009	Chinese Super League	4	0	-		-		-		4	0
Dalian Shide	2010	Chinese Super League	2	0	-		-		-		2	0
Dalian Shide	2011	Chinese Super League	0	0	0	0	-		-		0	0
Dalian Shide	Total		6	0	0	0	0	0	0	0	6	0
Beijing Yitong Kuche (Loan)	2012	China League Two	15	3	-		-		-		15	3
Liaoning Whowin	2013	Chinese Super League	9	0	3	0	-		-		12	0
Liaoning Whowin	2014	Chinese Super League	4	0	1	0	-		-		5	0
Liaoning Whowin	2015	Chinese Super League	2	0	0	0	-		-		2	0
Liaoning Whowin	2016	Chinese Super League	23	0	0	0	-		-		23	0
Liaoning Whowin	2017	Chinese Super League	17	0	0	0	-		-		17	0
Liaoning Whowin	Total		55	0	4	0	0	0	0	0	59	0
Dalian Yifang	2018	Chinese Super League	3	0	2	0	-		-		5	0
Dalian Yifang	2020	Chinese Super League	0	0	0	0	-		-		0	0
Dalian Yifang	Total		3	0	2	0	0	0	0	0	5	0
Dalian Chanjoy (Loan)	2019	China League Two	18	2	1	0	-		-		19	2
Dalian Duxing	2022	Chinese Champions League	-		-		-		-		-	
Career total			108	8	7	0	1	0	0	0	116	8
