= Zheng Jianfeng =

Chinese footballer

Zheng Jianfeng 郑剑锋
Personal information
- Full name: Zheng Jianfeng
- Date of birth: March 22, 1989 (age 37)
- Place of birth: Dalian, Liaoning, China
- Height: 1.78 m (5 ft 10 in)
- Position: Defender

Team information
- Current team: Dalian LFTZ Huayi

Youth career
- 2003–2008: Dalian Shide

Senior career*
| Years | Team | Apps | (Gls) |
| 2008 | Dalian Shide Singapore | 31 | (2) |
| 2009–2012 | Dalian Shide | 14 | (0) |
| 2013–2014 | Qingdao Jonoon | 0 | (0) |
| 2014 | → Dalian Transcendence (loan) | 7 | (0) |
| 2015–2016 | Desportivo Aves | 0 | (0) |
| 2016 | GS Loures | 7 | (0) |
| 2016 | 1º Dezembro | 5 | (0) |
| 2017 | Dalian Transcendence | 26 | (2) |
| 2018–2020 | Dalian Yifang | 3 | (0) |
| 2019 | → Dalian Chanjoy (loan) | 16 | (3) |
| 2022– | Dalian LFTZ Huayi | 0 | (0) |
- * Club domestic league appearances and goals as of 31 December 2022

Zheng Jianfeng (Chinese: 郑剑锋; pinyin: Zhèng Jiànfēng; born 22 March 1989) is a professional Chinese footballer who currently plays as a defender for Chinese club Dalian LFTZ Huayi.

== Club career ==
=== Dalian Shide ===
Zheng Jianfeng started his career with Dalian Shide and was sent out to their youth team called Dalian Shide Siwu who were allowed to take part in Singapore's 2008 S.League. Upon his return to Dalian Shide, he would be given his chance to make his debut for the team on 28 July 2010 in a league game against Changchun Yatai that Dalian won 2–1.

He transferred to fellow top tier club Qingdao Jonoon on 25 February 2013 after Dalian Shide was merged into local rivals Dalian Aerbin. He would not make any appearances for the team and was loaned out to third tier club Dalian Transcendence.

=== Stints in Portugal ===
After his loan ended Dalian Transcendence, he would leave his parent club and go abroad to Portugal where he had spells at Desportivo Aves, GS Loures and 1º Dezembro.

=== Return to China ===
On 5 January, 2017, second tier club Dalian Transcendence signed him on a free transfer. With them he would go on to establish himself as a vital member of their team and revive his career.

On 28 February 2018, Zheng transferred to Chinese Super League side Dalian Yifang (now known as Dalian Professional). On 28 February 2019, Zheng was loaned to League Two side Dalian Chanjoy for the 2019 season.

== Career statistics ==
Statistics accurate as of match played 31 December 2022.

Appearances and goals by club, season and competition
| Club | Season | League | | | National Cup | | League Cup | | Continental | | Total | |
| Club | Season | Division | Apps | Goals | Apps | Goals | Apps | Goals | Apps | Goals | Apps | Goals |
|---|---|---|---|---|---|---|---|---|---|---|---|---|
| Dalian Shide Siwu FC | 2008 | S.League | 31 | 2 | 1 | 0 | 1 | 0 | - | | 33 | 2 |
| Dalian Shide | 2009 | Chinese Super League | 0 | 0 | - | | - | | - | | 0 | 0 |
| Dalian Shide | 2010 | Chinese Super League | 2 | 0 | - | | - | | - | | 2 | 0 |
| Dalian Shide | 2011 | Chinese Super League | 10 | 0 | 0 | 0 | - | | - | | 10 | 0 |
| Dalian Shide | 2012 | Chinese Super League | 2 | 0 | 1 | 0 | - | | - | | 3 | 0 |
| Dalian Shide | Total | | 14 | 0 | 1 | 0 | 0 | 0 | 0 | 0 | 15 | 0 |
| Qingdao Jonoon | 2013 | Chinese Super League | 0 | 0 | 0 | 0 | - | | - | | 0 | 0 |
| Dalian Transcendence (Loan) | 2014 | China League Two | 7 | 0 | 0 | 0 | - | | - | | 7 | 0 |
| Desportivo Aves | 2015–16 | LigaPro | 0 | 0 | 0 | 0 | 0 | 0 | - | | 0 | 0 |
| Loures | 2015–16 | Campeonato de Portugal | 7 | 0 | 0 | 0 | - | | - | | 7 | 0 |
| 1º Dezembro | 2016–17 | Campeonato de Portugal | 5 | 0 | 0 | 0 | - | | - | | 5 | 0 |
| Dalian Transcendence | 2017 | China League One | 26 | 2 | 0 | 0 | - | | - | | 26 | 2 |
| Dalian Yifang | 2018 | Chinese Super League | 3 | 0 | 0 | 0 | - | | - | | 3 | 0 |
| Dalian Yifang | 2020 | Chinese Super League | 0 | 0 | 0 | 0 | - | | - | | 0 | 0 |
| Dalian Yifang | Total | | 3 | 0 | 0 | 0 | 0 | 0 | 0 | 0 | 3 | 0 |
| Dalian Chanjoy (Loan) | 2019 | China League Two | 16 | 3 | 1 | 0 | - | | - | | 17 | 3 |
| Dalian LFTZ Huayi | 2022 | Chinese Champions League | - | | - | | - | | - | | - | |
| Career total | | | 109 | 7 | 3 | 0 | 1 | 0 | 0 | 0 | 113 | 7 |
