= Hao Xingchen =

Chinese footballer

Personal information
- Full name: Hao Xingchen
- Date of birth: July 10, 1987 (age 39)
- Place of birth: China
- Height: 1.80 m (5 ft 11 in)
- Position: Forward

Senior career*
Years	Team	Apps	(Gls)
2009–2012	Dalian Shide	6	(0)
2014–2018	Dalian Transcendence	11	(0)
- * Club domestic league appearances and goals as of 22 October 2016

Hao Xingchen
- Traditional Chinese: 郝興晨
- Simplified Chinese: 郝兴晨
Transcriptions
Standard Mandarin
- Hanyu Pinyin: Hǎo Xìngchen

Hao Xingchen is a former Chinese professional footballer who played as a forward.

== Club career ==
Hao Xingchen started his professional career with Dalian Shide F.C. and would make his debut on October 31, 2009 in a league game against Qingdao Jonoon in a 3-1 defeat.

In March 2014, Hao transferred to China League Two side Dalian Transcendence.

Following the dissolve of Dalian Transcendence, Hao decided to retire.
