= Martin Kamburov =

Bulgarian footballer

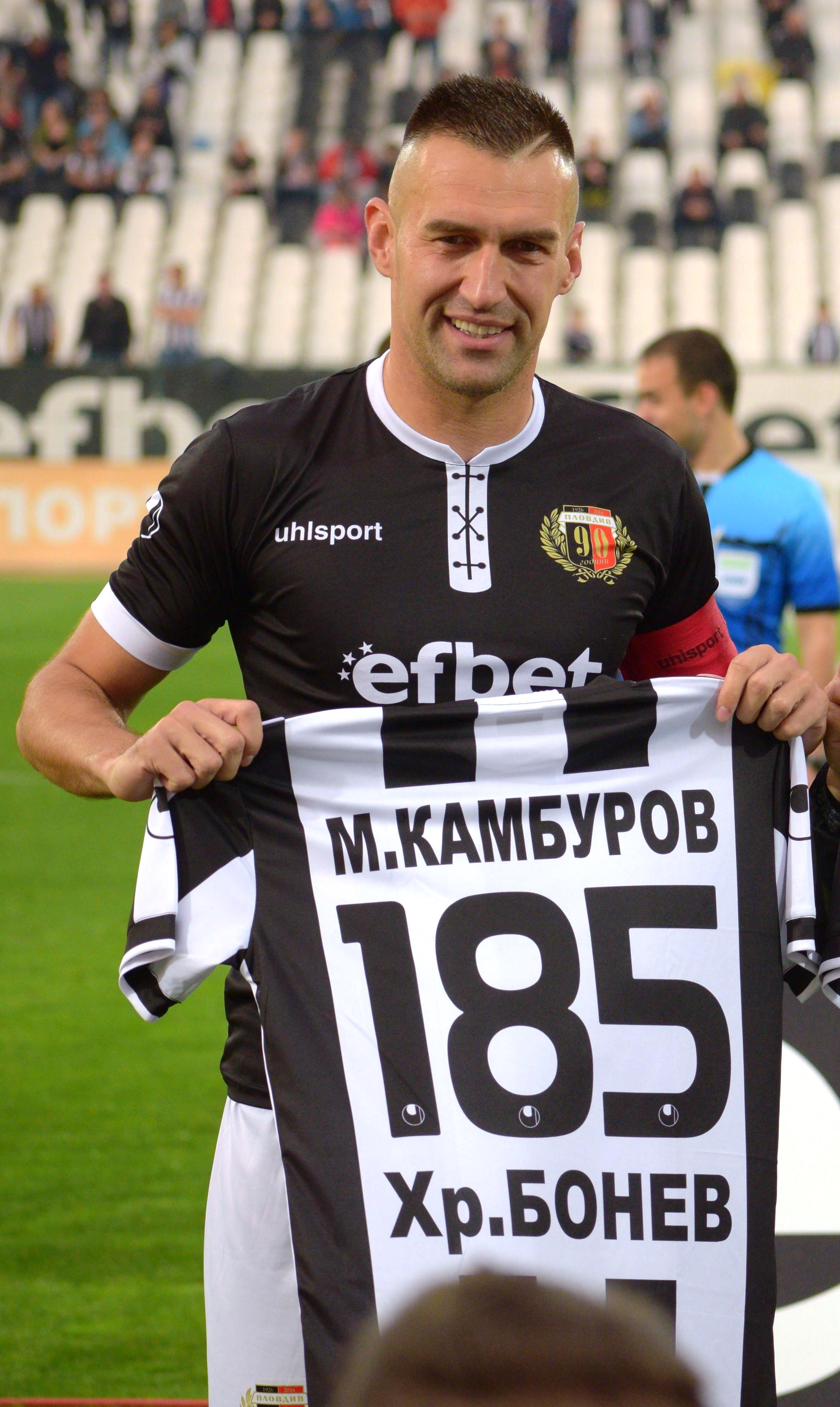
- Kamburov with Lokomotiv Plovdiv in 2017

Personal information
- Full name: Martin Andreev Kamburov
- Date of birth: 13 October 1980 (age 46)
- Place of birth: Svilengrad, Bulgaria
- Height: 1.88 m (6 ft 2 in)
- Position: Striker

Senior career*
Years	Team	Apps	(Gls)
1998–1999	Botev Plovdiv	11	(1)
2000	Lokomotiv Plovdiv	4	(0)
2000–2001	Svilengrad	19	(7)
2001	Botev Plovdiv	9	(1)
2001–2002	Spartak Pleven	31	(6)
2002–2006	Lokomotiv Plovdiv	91	(73)
2006–2007	Al Ahli Dubai	22	(13)
2007	Lokomotiv Plovdiv	11	(5)
2007–2008	Asteras Tripolis	10	(1)
2009–2010	Lokomotiv Sofia	44	(33)
2010–2012	Dalian Shide	64	(27)
2013	CSKA Sofia	11	(3)
2013–2014	Lokomotiv Plovdiv	35	(20)
2014	CSKA Sofia	0	(0)
2014–2017	Lokomotiv Plovdiv	91	(47)
2017–2020	Beroe	94	(48)
2020	CSKA 1948	15	(9)
2021	Beroe	28	(10)
Total		591	(305)

International career
2003–2010	Bulgaria	15	(0)
- * Club domestic league appearances and goals

Martin Andreev Kamburov (Bulgarian: Мартин Андреев Камбуров; born 13 October 1980) is a Bulgarian former professional footballer who played as a striker. He is the top scorer in Bulgarian First League history with 256 goals.

Kamburov spent the majority of his career with Lokomotiv Plovdiv. He is Lokomotiv's all-time 2nd highest goalscorer in the Bulgarian League, scoring 145 goals in his five periods with the club. He also played for Botev Plovdiv, Svilengrad, Spartak Pleven, Lokomotiv Sofia, CSKA Sofia, Al Ahli Dubai, Greek side Asteras Tripolis, Chinese Dalian Shide, Beroe and CSKA 1948.

== Career ==
=== Early career ===
Born in Svilengrad, Kamburov began his career with Botev Plovdiv. He made his first-team debut during 1998–99 season, scoring his first goal in a 3–1 away loss against Neftochimic Burgas on 6 March 1999. Then he switched to local rivals Lokomotiv Plovdiv, with whom he won the top Bulgarian league, A PFG, in 2004, and the bronze medals in 2005. Kamburov was also the league top scorer in these two seasons with 26 and 27 goals respectively.

=== Al-Ahli ===
In December 2005, Kamburov was transferred to the UAE in Al-Ahli (Dubai) side for €2 million and signed a five-year contract. He was capped 33 times and scored 16 goals. In 2007, he returned to his former club – Lokomotiv Plovdiv.

=== Lokomotiv Sofia ===
Lokomotiv Sofia signed Martin Kamburov on 9 January 2009 to a three-year deal. He was given the number 19 shirt. Kamburov had an excellent start to the season, netting 10 goals in just 6 games, including a spectacular hat-trick in Loko Sofia's away game against Levski Sofia on 11 April 2009 to help the team from the Nadezhda district secure a historic 3:0 win. Kamburov became the top scorer in the 2008/2009 season in the Bulgarian A Professional Football Group, managing 17 goals in total, a remarkable achievement given that he only played in half of the season's games. In the winter of 2009, Kamburov won the best forward of A PFG award once again. At around the same time, he was again called up for the Bulgaria national football team, with his selection greeted with enthusiasm by most Bulgarian fans.

Kamburov ended the 2009/2010 season with 29 matches and 16 goals.

=== Dalian Shide ===
Kamburov was transferred to Dalian Shide in July 2010. He made his debut for Dalian on 28 July and scored his first CSL goal on 1 August.

=== CSKA Sofia ===
On 18 December 2012 Kamburov signed a one-and-a-half-year deal with CSKA Sofia. His official debut came in the 0:2 home loss against Litex Lovech on 2 March 2013 and he scored his first goal on 31 March 2013 in the 3:0 home win over Minyor Pernik. Kamburov made his first appearance in The Eternal Derby on 27 April 2013, coming on as a second-half substitute in a match that was lost 1:2 by his team.

=== Lokomotiv Plovdiv ===
In the summer of 2013, Kamburov rejoined Lokomotiv Plovdiv. He became the league's top scorer in the 2013–14 season for fourth time in his career with 20 goals in 35 matches.

=== CSKA Sofia ===
On 5 June 2014, Kamburov returned to CSKA Sofia, signing a contract for a period of one year. Kamburov's second stint with the "armymen" turned out to be even shorter than the first, as he made just two official appearances for the team - in the matches with Moldovan team Zimbru Chisinau in the UEFA Europa League, before leaving the club in late July 2014, in part due to his belief that he may not be able to get sufficient playing time for them.

=== Lokomotiv Plovdiv ===
Kamburov then rejoined Lokomotiv Plovdiv and scored a goal in his first game of the 2014–15 season - a 2–1 away win over Haskovo on 2 August. On 3 August 2017, Kamburov's contract was terminated by mutual agreement.

=== Beroe ===
On 8 August 2017, Kamburov signed with Beroe Stara Zagora. Following the departure of Martin Raynov in February 2019, Kamburov was made captain of Beroe. On 5 March 2019, he signed a one-year contract extension, keeping him at Beroe until 2020.

=== CSKA 1948 ===
In June 2020, while still part of the Beroe team with which he completed the season, Kamburov signed a deal with CSKA 1948.

=== Beroe ===
On 13 September 2021, Kamburov scored the only goal in Beroe's 1:0 win over Tsarsko Selo, which was the 254th occasion of him finding the net in the Bulgarian top division. He thus surpassed Petar Zhekov's record of 253 goals.

=== International career ===
Kamburov earned his first cap for Bulgaria on 18 November 2003, replacing goalscorer Vladimir Manchev in the 1:0 away win over South Korea in a friendly match.

== Career statistics ==
As of 1 December 2021

Appearances and goals by club, season and competition
Club	Season	League			National cups		Europe		Total	
Club	Season	Division	Apps	Goals	Apps	Goals	Apps	Goals	Apps	Goals
Botev Plovdiv	1998–99	A PFG	9	1	–		–		9	1
Botev Plovdiv	1999–2000	A PFG	2	0	1	1	–		3	1
Botev Plovdiv	Total		11	1	1	1	–		12	2
Svilengrad	1999–00	V AFG	11	4	–		–		11	4
Lokomotiv Plovdiv	2000–01	B PFG	4	0	–		–		4	0
Svilengrad	2000–01	V AFG	8	3	–		–		8	3
Botev Plovdiv	2000–01	A PFG	6	2	0	0	–		6	2
Spartak Pleven	2001–02	A PFG	20	5	0	0	–		20	5
Lokomotiv Plovdiv	2002–03	A PFG	20	8	0	0	–		20	8
Lokomotiv Plovdiv	2003–04	A PFG	29	25	0	0	–		29	25
Lokomotiv Plovdiv	2004–05	A PFG	29	27	0	0	–		29	27
Lokomotiv Plovdiv	2005–06	A PFG	13	13	0	0	–		13	13
Lokomotiv Plovdiv	Total		91	73	0	0	–		91	73
Al-Ahli	2005–0–06	Gulf League	12	7	0	0	–		12	7
Al-Ahli	2006–07	Gulf League	21	9	0	0	–		21	9
Al-Ahli	Total		33	16	0	0	–		33	16
Lokomotiv Plovdiv	2007–08	A PFG	12	5	0	0	–		12	5
Asteras Tripoli	2007–08	Super League Greece	5	1	0	0	–		5	1
Asteras Tripoli	2008–09	Super League Greece	5	0	0	0	–		5	0
Asteras Tripoli	Total		10	1	0	0	–		10	1
Lokomotiv Sofia	2008–09	A PFG	15	17	0	0	–		15	17
Lokomotiv Sofia	2009–10	A PFG	29	16	0	0	–		29	16
Lokomotiv Sofia	Total		44	33	0	0	–		44	33
Dalian Shide	2010	Chinese Super League	15	7	0	0	–		15	7
Dalian Shide	2011	Chinese Super League	25	10	0	0	–		25	10
Dalian Shide	2012	Chinese Super League	24	10	0	0	–		24	10
Dalian Shide	Total		64	27	0	0	–		64	27
CSKA Sofia	2012–13	A PFG	11	3	2	0	–		13	3
Lokomotiv Plovdiv	2013–14	A PFG	35	20	4	1	–		39	21
CSKA Sofia	2014–15	A PFG	0	0	0	0	2	0	2	0
Lokomotiv Plovdiv	2014–15	A PFG	28	13	4	1	–		32	14
Lokomotiv Plovdiv	2015–16	A PFG	28	18	2	0	–		30	18
Lokomotiv Plovdiv	2016–17	Bulgarian First League	33	16	2	1	–		35	17
Lokomotiv Plovdiv	Total		89	47	8	2	–		97	49
Beroe Stara Zagora	2017–18	Bulgarian First League	30	14	0	0	–		30	14
Beroe Stara Zagora	2018–19	Bulgarian First League	35	16	2	0	–		37	16
Beroe Stara Zagora	2019–20	Bulgarian First League	29	18	2	0	–		31	18
Beroe Stara Zagora	Total		94	48	4	0	–		98	48
CSKA 1948	2020–21	Bulgarian First League	15	9	0	0	–		15	9
Beroe Stara Zagora	2020–21	Bulgarian First League	14	5	1	1	–		15	6
Beroe Stara Zagora	2021–22	Bulgarian First League	12	5	1	1	–		13	6
Beroe Stara Zagora	Total		26	10	2	2	–		28	12
Career total			584	307	21	6	2	0	607	313

== Honours ==
Lokomotiv Plovdiv

- A Group: 2003–04
- Bulgarian Supercup: 2004

Al-Ahli Dubai

- UAE Pro League: 2005–06

Individual

- A Group top scorer: 2003–04 (25 goals), 2004–05 (27 goals), 2008–09 (17 goals), 2013–14 (20 goals), 2015–16 (18 goals), 2019–20 (18 goals)
- Best forward in the A Group: 2009, 2013, 2014, 2020, 2021
- 2nd place in the Bulgarian Footballer of the Year ranking – 2017, 2021
