= 2008 S.League =

S. League
- Season: 2008
- Champions: Singapore Armed Forces; 7th S.League title
- AFC Champions League: Singapore Armed Forces (S.League winners)
- AFC Cup: Home United (S.League 2nd runners-up)
- Matches played: 198
- Goals scored: 572 (2.89 per match)
- Top goalscorer: Aleksandar Duric (28)
- Biggest home win: Home United 6-1 Geylang United (15 March 2008); Home United 6-1 Balestier Khalsa (17 November 2008)
- Biggest away win: (China) Dalian Shide Siwu 0-6 Home United (19 May 2008)

2008 S.League is the 13th season of Singapore's professional football league. It was won by Singapore Armed Forces, which was their seventh league title.

== League table ==
Pos	Team	Pld	W	D	L	GF	GA	GD	Pts	Qualification
1	Singapore Armed Forces	33	24	5	4	85	34	+51	77	Qualification to AFC Champions League Qualifying Play-off or AFC Cup group stage
2	(South Korea) Super Reds (Note: The three foreign clubs – Albirex Niigata (S), Dalian Shide Siwu and Super Reds – as well as the Football Association of Singapore under-23 team, Young Lions, were not eligible for qualification to continental competitions.)	33	24	3	6	68	32	+36	75	
3	Home United	33	23	3	7	75	31	+44	72	Qualification to AFC Cup Group Stage (Note: Home United qualified for the 2009 AFC Cup by being the next highest-placed local club behind S.League and 2008 Singapore Cup winners Singapore Armed Forces.)
4	Tampines Rovers	33	20	5	8	66	37	+29	65	
5	Gombak United	33	14	10	9	47	39	+8	52	
6	Geylang United	33	13	6	14	56	57	−1	45	
7	(Japan) Albirex Niigata (S)	33	10	11	12	44	55	−11	41	
8	Woodlands Wellington	33	9	8	16	36	52	−16	35	
9	(Singapore) Young Lions	33	7	10	16	30	46	−16	31	
10	(China) Dalian Shide Siwu	33	5	7	21	26	75	−49	22	
11	Sengkang Punggol	33	3	10	20	13	54	−41	19	
12	Balestier Khalsa	33	3	8	22	26	60	−34	17	

Source: RSSSF
Rules for classification: 1) points; 2) goal difference; 3) number of goals scored; 4) head-to-head

== Teams ==
Location of teams in 2008 S.League

Team	Stadium	Capacity
(Japan) Albirex Niigata (S)	Jurong East Stadium	2,700
Balestier Khalsa	Toa Payoh Stadium	3,896
(China) Dalian Shide	Queenstown Stadium	3,800
Geylang United	Bedok Stadium	3,864
Gombak United	Jurong West Stadium	4,000
Home United	Bishan Stadium	4,254
Singapore Armed Forces	Choa Chu Kang Stadium	4,600
Sengkang Punggol	Hougang Stadium	2,500
(South Korea) Super Reds	Yishun Stadium	3,400
Tampines Rovers	Tampines Stadium	3,580
Woodlands Wellington	Woodlands Stadium	4,300
Young Lions	Jalan Besar Stadium	6,000

- The league play all its Friday matches, which is televised live on MediaCorp Channel 5 at the Jalan Besar Stadium.

== Foreign players ==
Each club is allowed to have up to a maximum of 4 foreign players.

Club	Player 1	Player 2	Player 3	Player 4	Prime League	Former Player
Balestier Khalsa	(Japan) Haruki Seto	(Japan) Hironori Saruta	(Cameroon) Paul Ekollo	(Nigeria) Mba Vitus Onyekachi	(Cameroon) Kaze Teffo Etienne	(Nigeria) Emmanuel Toluwase
Geylang International	(Brazil) Rivaldo	(Brazil) Junior	(Slovakia) Rastislav Beličák	(Slovakia) Miroslav Latiak	None	None
Gombak United	(Thailand) Theerawekin Seehawong	(Nigeria) Gabriel Obatola	(Nigeria) Kingsley Njoku	(Nigeria) Emmanuel Emuejeraye	None	None
Home United	(Thailand) Kornprom Jaroonpong	(Brazil) Peres De Oliveira	(Cameroon) Kengne Ludovick	(Cameroon) Valery Hiek	(Thailand) Naruphol Ar-Romsawa	None
Sengkang Punggol	(Japan) Hiroyuki Yamamoto	(Croatia) Zdravko Šimić	(Brazil) Reginaldo Estevao	(Chile) Luis Eduardo Hicks	(New Zealand) Cole Tinkler	(Chile) Iván Asenjo
SAFFC	(Japan) Norikazu Murakami	(Japan) Kenji Arai	(Japan) Masahiro Fukasawa	(Thailand) Therdsak Chaiman	None	None
Tampines Rovers	(Thailand) Sutee Suksomkit	(Thailand) Attapong Nooprom	(Thailand) Santi Chaiyaphurk	None	(Thailand) Sanrawat Dechmitr	None
Woodlands	(South Korea) Park Tae-won	(Japan) Akihiro Nakamura	(Morocco) Laakkad Abdelhadi	(Romania) Lucian Dronca	None	None
Young Lions	(Nigeria) Obadin Aikhena	(Cameroon) Moudourou Moise	(England) Daniel Hammond	None	None	None

- Albirex Niigata (S), Dalian Shide and Super Reds are not allowed to hire any foreigners.

== Leading goalscorers ==
Player	Team	Goals!
Aleksandar Duric	Singapore Armed Forces	28
(Cameroon) Kengne Ludovick	Home United	24
Khairul Amri	Tampines Rovers	19 (10 for Young Lions)
(Nigeria) O. J. Obatola	Gombak United	16
(Japan) Akira Takase	(Japan) Albirex Niigata (S)	14
Aliff Shafaein	Tampines Rovers	13
(Japan) Norikazu Murakami	Singapore Armed Forces	13
(South Korea) Park Tae Won	Woodlands Wellington	13
(Brazil) Rivaldo Costa	Geylang United	13
Fazrul Nawaz	Geylang United	12
(South Korea) Oh Ddog Yi	(South Korea) Super Reds	12
Qiu Li	Tampines Rovers	12

== S-League Awards Night Winners ==
Player of the Year
Aleksandar Duric - Singapore Armed Forces

Young Player of the Year
Khairul Amri - Tampines Rovers

Coach of the Year
(Japan) Hiroaki Hiraoka - (Japan) Albirex Niigata (S)

Top Scorer Award
Aleksandar Duric - Singapore Armed Forces

Fair Play Award
(South Korea) Super Reds

Referee of the Year
T Aravinthan

Assistant Referee of the Year
Jeffrey Goh Gek Pheng

Goal of the Year
(Morocco) Abdelhadi Laakkad - Woodlands Wellington - (vs Young Lions on 23 February @ Woodlands Stadium)

Fan Club of the Year
Singapore Armed Forces

Story of the Year
Shamir Osman - Today - "No Panic As Dark Clouds Loom"

Picture of the Year
Koh Mui Fong - Today - "Super Reds Flying High"

People's Choice Award
(Cameroon) Kengne Ludovick - Home United

100 S.League Goals
(South Korea) Park Tae Won - Woodlands Wellington
