= Dalian Shide F.C. =

Chinese football club

Dalian Shide 大连实德
- Full name: Dalian Shide FC 大连实德队
- Nickname: Eight-star Dalian
- Founded: 1955; 71 years ago as Dalian Shipyards (Amateur); 1983 as Dalian FC (Semi-professional); 1992 (Professional)
- Dissolved: 30 November 2012
- Ground: Jinzhou Stadium, Dalian, Liaoning, China
- Capacity: 30,776
- Chairman: Xu Ming
- Manager: Nelo Vingada
- League: Chinese Super League
- 2012: Chinese Super League, 14th of 16 (relegated)
Home colours	Away colours

Dalian Shide F.C.
- Simplified Chinese: 大连实德
- Traditional Chinese: 大連實德
Transcriptions
Standard Mandarin
- Hanyu Pinyin: Dàlián Shídé

Dalian Shide was a professional Chinese football club based in Dalian, Liaoning province, China who played in China's football league system between 1955 and 2012. Their home stadiums were the 55,843 capacity Dalian People's Stadium and then later in 1997 they moved to the 30,776 capacity Jinzhou Stadium.

The club was initially founded in 1955 as Dalian Shipyards and made sporadic appearances within the Chinese national leagues until 1982 when the local Dalian government took ownership of the club and renamed it Dalian Football Club. The club won their first major silverware when they won the 1992 domestic cup title. In 1993, the club was reorganised to become a completely professional football team, renamed themselves Dalian Wanda FC and went on to win the first fully professional 1994 Chinese Jia-A League title. The tycoon Xu Ming and the Shide Group would go on to take over the club rename it Dalian Shide.

Achieving a total of eight league titles from both the Jia A and the rebranded CSL Dalian were the most successful club in Chinese football, while in the Asian Football Confederation the club reached the 1997–98 Asian Club Championship and 2000–01 Asian Cup Winners' Cup finals.

The club accumulated a huge debt and was eventually sold and merged into another club, thus becoming defunct.

== History ==
The club was founded as Dalian Shipyards in 1955. After the 1982 season the local Dalian government took over its ownership and renamed it Dalian Football Club to represent the city. The club immediately became a major force within the second tier and eventually win promotion to the top level in 1984 when they won the division title. For the next several seasons Dalian were predominantly top tier regulars except for one season in 1989 when they were in the second tier, however they quickly won promotion and soon went on to win their first domestic cup in 1992.

Dalian Wanda logo used between 1994 and 1999

Soon afterwards the Chinese Football Association started to demand full professionalism and sponsorship from all the clubs in China. Dalian went on to be one of the first fully professionalised clubs in China on July 3, 1992. They gained sponsorship in 1993 from the China Hualu group and then the Dalian Wanda Group on March 8, 1994, who changed the club's name to Dalian Wanda FC. In the inaugural fully professional 1994 league season, the club brought in former Chinese national team manager Zhang Honggen to coach the team and under his leadership guide the club to their first ever league title. The following season saw Zhang Honggen decide to not stay on as the club's manager and Dalian were unable to retain the league title, however the club eventually brought in former Chinese international player Chi Shangbin into the club as their new manager. With Wang Jianlin and the full support of his company the Dalian Wanda Group taking full ownership of the club, they started to build a football dynasty by winning the 1996 league season undefeated. Domestic dominance continued in the 1997 league season while Dalian narrowly just missed out on 1997–98 Asian Club Championship and Chi Shangbin decided to leave to take on a position with the Chinese national team. Despite this Dalian had a well-funded and prolific academy that produced numerous Chinese internationals such as Zhang Enhua, Li Ming and Sun Jihai and with another former Chinese national team manager Xu Genbao Dalian were easily able to replicate their success by winning the 1998 league title.

In 2000 at the height of their success, Wang Jianlin decided to pull out from football after publicly criticizing Chinese referees for match fixing and he did not return to football until 2011 when his associated Wanda Group sponsored the 2011 Chinese Super League after former Chinese FA Vice-chairmen Xie Yalong and Nan Yong stood on trial for bribery.

On January 9, 2000, Wang Jianlin sold Dalian to Xu Ming and the Shide Group for 120 million Yuan and the club's name was changed to Dalian Shide. The new owners brought in Serbian Milorad Kosanović as their new manager and win another league title in the 2000 league season. Kosanović made the men's team by far the most successful team in Chinese football by winning the 2001, 2002 league title, 2001 Chinese FA Cup and just missing out on 2000–01 Asian Cup Winners' Cup during his reign. When Milorad Kosanović left to coach the Serbia and Montenegro national under-21 football team the club eventually brought in Vladimir Petrović who guided the team to the recently rebranded 2005 Chinese Super League title as well as 2005 Chinese FA Cup. With the retirement of striker Hao Haidong and Vladimir Petrović leaving to take the Chinese national team management position, the club went through an inconsistent period due to team and coach changes. In 2008, Dalian Shide selected a number of players from its academy to play in a satellite team in the S.League in Singapore, called Dalian Shide Siwu FC.

On 14 February 2010, Zhang Yalin died of lymphoma in Dalian, Liaoning, aged 28, after a two-year-battle with the disease.

On 30 November 2012, Dalian Shide were acquired by Aerbin Group and merged into Dalian Aerbin F.C., although a lot of confusion and rumour surrounded the demise of Shide.

== Club name history ==
- 1955–1982: Dalian Shipyards
- 1983–1992: Dalian Football Club
- 1993: Dalian Hualu
- 1994–1998: Dalian Wanda (simplified Chinese: 大连万达; traditional Chinese: 大連萬達; pinyin: Dàlián Wàndá)
- 1999: Dalian Wanda Shide (simplified Chinese: 大连万达实德; traditional Chinese: 大連萬達實德; pinyin: Dàlián Wàndá Shídé)
- 2000–2012: Dalian Shide (simplified Chinese: 大连实德; traditional Chinese: 大連實德; pinyin: Dàlián Shídé)

== Grounds ==
Dalian played in the 55,843-seat multi-purpose Dalian People's Stadium for much of their early history. In 1997 the club moved to the recently built 31,000 seat multi-use Jinzhou Stadium in Dalian, China.

=== Last Squad ===
As of 5 December 2012

Note: Flags indicate national team as defined under FIFA eligibility rules; some limited exceptions apply. Players may hold more than one non-FIFA nationality.

No.	Pos.	Nation	Player
1	GK	CHN	Sun Shoubo
2	DF	CHN	Jin Yangyang
3	DF	CHN	Zheng Jianfeng
4	DF	CHN	Xue Ya'nan
5	DF	CHN	Yang Boyu
7	DF	CHN	Zhang Yaokun
8	FW	CHN	Zhu Ting
9	MF	BUL	Martin Kamburov
10	FW	BRA	Adriano
11	FW	ZAM	James Chamanga
12	GK	CHN	Jing Hao
13	MF	CHN	Quan Lei
14	FW	CHN	Zhao Xuebin
16	MF	CHN	Hao Xingchen
17	MF	CHN	Liu Yingchen
18	MF	CHN	Li Zhichao

No.	Pos.	Nation	Player
19	FW	CHN	Yan Xiangchuang
20	MF	POR	Ricardo Esteves
21	MF	CHN	Lü Peng
22	GK	CHN	Zhang Chong
23	DF	KOR	Park Dong-Hyuk
24	MF	CHN	Yan Song
25	DF	CHN	Jihong Jiang
27	MF	CHN	Li Xuepeng
28	DF	CHN	Qu Jiachen
29	MF	CHN	Sun Guowen
30	MF	CHN	Ni Yusong
31	MF	CHN	Zhao Honglue
33	MF	CHN	Wang Liang
46	MF	CHN	Yan Feng
-	FW	CHN	Nan Yunqi

=== Retired numbers ===
26 – (China) Zhang Yalin, Midfielder, 2000–2009 posthumous. The number was retired in March 2010.

== Last coaching staff ==
Position	Staff
Head coach	(Portugal) Nelo Vingada
Assistant coaches	(China) Liu Zhongchang (China) Shi Lei
Fitness coach	(Serbia) Dusko Tomas
Goalkeeping coach	(China) Han Wenhai
Team physicians	(China) Yu Jiatian (China) Liu Guosheng

Source: Sina.com

=== Managerial history ===
Managers who have coached the club and team since the team became a professional club back on July 3, 1992

Manager	Period
(China) Zhang Honggen	1994
(China) Gai Zengjun	1995
(China) Chi Shangbin	July 1995 – Jan 1998
(China) Xu Genbao	1998–99
(Serbia) Milorad Kosanović	2000–04
(China) Hao Haidong (Caretaker)	2004
(Serbia) Vladimir Petrović	July 2005 – Dec 2006
(Netherlands) Jo Bonfrere	July 2008 – Dec 2007
(Serbia) Ratko Dostanić	Jan 2008 – June 2008
(Serbia) Milorad Kosanović	2008
(China) Xu Hong	2008–10
(China) Liu Zhongchang (Caretaker)	2010
(South Korea) Park Seong-Hwa	2010–11
(China) Li Xicai (Caretaker)	2011
(China) Gai Zengjun (Caretaker)	2011
(Portugal) Nelo Vingada	July 2011 – November 2012

== Honours ==
All-time honours list including amateur period.

=== League ===
- Chinese Jia-A League/Chinese Super League
  - Winners (8): 1994, 1996, 1997, 1998, 2000, 2001, 2002, 2005
- Chinese Jia-B League
  - Winners (2): 1983, 1984
- Chinese Yi League/China League Two (Third Tier League)
  - Winners (1): 1981

=== Cup ===
- Chinese FA Cup
  - Winners (3): 1992, 2001, 2005
- Chinese Super Cup
  - Winners (3): 1996, 2000, 2002

=== Continental ===
- Asian Club Championship
  - Runners-up (1): 1997–98
- Asian Cup Winners' Cup
  - Runners-up (1): 2001

=== Youth ===
- U19
  - U19 Winners Cup Winners: 2006
- U17
  - U17 Youth League Champions: 2000

== Results ==
All-time League Rankings

- As of end of 2012 league season.

Year	Div	Pld	W	D	L	GF	GA	GD	Pts	Pos.	FA Cup	Super Cup	League Cup	AFC	Other		Att./G	Stadium
1955	1	10	8	1	1	40	7	33	17	RU	NH	–	–	–				
1965	2									R1	NH	–	–	–				
1981	3	9	7	–	2				14	W^{1}	NH	–	–	–				Dalian People's Stadium
1982	2	30	13	–	17	38	41	−3	26	12	NH	–	–	–				Dalian People's Stadium
1983	2	15	12	–	3				24	W^{1}	NH	–	–	–				Dalian People's Stadium
1984	2	7^{2}	6^{2}	–	1^{2}				12^{2}	W	R1	–	–	–				Dalian People's Stadium
1985	1	15	9		6			+10	20	3	QR1	–	–	DNQ				Dalian People's Stadium
1986	1	14	4	5	5	11	13	−2	13	9	R1	–	–	DNQ				Dalian People's Stadium
1987	2	20	9	7	4	28	20	+8	25	3	NH	–	–	DNQ				Dalian People's Stadium
1988	1	25	9	8	8	36	30	+6	39.5	10	NH	–	–	DNQ				Dalian People's Stadium
1989	2	22	13	4	5	36	15	+21	46	RU	NH	–	–	DNQ				Dalian People's Stadium
1990	1	14	8	2	4	17	10	+7	26	3	RU	–	–	DNQ				Dalian People's Stadium
1991	1	14	5	4	5	17	17	0	15	6	R1	–	–	DNQ				Dalian People's Stadium
1992	1	14	7	3	4	25	15	+10	17	3	W	–	–	DNQ				Dalian People's Stadium
1993	1	12	3	1/6	2	9	8	+1	8	4	NH	–	–	DNQ	ACWC	R1		Sanshui City Stadium
1994	1	22	14	5	3	43	21	+22	33	W	NH	–	–	DNQ			26,636	Dalian People's Stadium
1995	1	22	12	6	4	27	22	+5	42	3	QF	DNQ	–	DNE			22,273	Dalian People's Stadium
1996	1	22	12	10	0	42	18	+24	46	W	SF	W	–	DNQ			29,364	Dalian People's Stadium
1997	1	22	15	6	1	47	16	+31	51	W	R2	RU	–	RU			19,455	Jinzhou Stadium
1998	1	26	19	5	2	64	16	+48	62	W	SF	RU	–	4	FECC	RU	27,769	Jinzhou Stadium
1999	1	26	7	10	9	30	30	0	31	9	RU	DNQ	–	DNE			17,769	Jinzhou Stadium
2000	1	26	17	5	4	50	21	+29	56	W	R2	W	–	DNQ	ACWC	RU	27,077	Jinzhou Stadium
2001	1	26	16	5	5	58	31	27	53	W	W	RU	–	QF			21,385	Jinzhou Stadium
2002	1	28	17	6	5	48	27	+21	57	W	R2	W	–	SF			18,429	Jinzhou Stadium
2003	1	28	15	8	5	44	22	+22	53	3	RU	DNQ	–	–	A3CC	RU	30,500	Jinzhou Stadium
2004	1	22	10	6	6	33	26	+7	30^{3}	5	SF	NH	QF	QF			11,273	Jinzhou Stadium
2005	1	26	21	2	3	57	18	+39	65	W	W	NH	R1	DNQ			14,000	Jinzhou Stadium
2006	1	28	13	6	9	43	29	+14	45	5	RU	NH	NH	Group	A3CC	4	5,043	Jinzhou Stadium
2007	1	28	11	11	6	36	31	+5	44	5	NH	NH	NH	DNQ			10,286	Jinzhou Stadium
2008	1	30	6	12	12	30	40	−10	30	14	NH	NH	NH	DNQ			7,900	Jinzhou Stadium
2009	1	30	10	8	12	27	31	−4	38	8	NH	NH	NH	DNQ			16,613	Jinzhou Stadium
2010	1	30	10	12	8	40	37	+3	42	6	NH	NH	NH	DNQ			12,307	Jinzhou Stadium
2011	1	30	7	11	12	27	43	−16	32	12	R2	NH	NH	DNQ			17,148	Jinzhou Stadium
2012	1	30	8	10	12	39	49	−10	34	14	R4	DNQ	NH	DNQ			11,093	Jinzhou Stadium

- ^1: No promotion. ^2: In final group stage. ^3: Deduct 6 points for abandoning a match in protest of a referee's call.

Key

	China top division
	China second division
	China third division
W	Winners
RU	Runners-up
3	Third place
	Relegated

- Pld = Played
- W = Games won
- D = Games drawn
- L = Games lost
- F = Goals for
- A = Goals against
- Pts = Points
- Pos = Final position
- DNQ = Did not qualify
- DNE = Did not enter
- NH = Not Held
- - = Does Not Exist
- R1 = Round 1
- R2 = Round 2
- R3 = Round 3
- R4 = Round 4
- F = Final
- SF = Semi-finals
- QF = Quarter-finals
- R16 = Round of 16
- Group = Group stage
- GS2 = Second Group stage
- QR1 = First Qualifying Round
- QR2 = Second Qualifying Round
- QR3 = Third Qualifying Round

== See also ==
- Dalian Shide FC (Singapore)
