= 2015 Guangzhou R&F F.C. season =

Guangzhou R&F
- Chairman: Zhang Li
- Manager: Cosmin Contra (to July 22); Li Bing (interim); Dragan Stojković (from August 24)
- Stadium: Yuexiushan Stadium; Guangzhou Higher Education Mega Center Central Stadium
- Super League: 12th
- FA Cup: Fourth Round
- AFC Champions League: Group Stage
- Top goalscorer: League: Aaron Samuel (7); All: Aaron Samuel (7)
- Average home league attendance: 7,989
Home colours	Away colours

The 2015 Guangzhou R&F season is the 5th year in Guangzhou R&F's existence and its 5th season in the Chinese football league, also its 4th season in the top flight.

== Squad ==
As of 12 August 2015

Note: Flags indicate national team as defined under FIFA eligibility rules; some limited exceptions apply. Players may hold more than one non-FIFA nationality.

No.	Pos.	Nation	Player
1	GK	CHN	Cheng Yuelei
3	DF	CHN	Yu Yang
4	DF	CHN	Jin Yangyang
5	DF	CHN	Zhang Yaokun (captain)
6	MF	CHN	Wang Song
7	FW	CHN	Jiang Ning
10	MF	ESP	Míchel
11	MF	CHN	Jiang Zhipeng
13	MF	CHN	Ye Chugui
14	DF	CHN	Li Jianhua
15	DF	KOR	Jang Hyun-Soo
16	DF	CHN	Feng Zhuoyi
17	GK	CHN	Zhang Shichang
18	FW	CHN	Zhang Yuan
19	MF	CHN	Wang Xiaolong

No.	Pos.	Nation	Player
20	MF	CHN	Tang Miao
21	FW	CHN	Chang Feiya
22	FW	COD	Jeremy Bokila
23	MF	CHN	Lu Lin
24	FW	CHN	Men Yang
25	FW	NGR	Aaron Samuel
26	DF	CHN	Zhang Chenlong
27	GK	CHN	Liu Dianzuo
28	GK	CHN	Pei Chensong
30	DF	CHN	Fu Yunlong
31	MF	BRA	Renatinho
33	MF	CHN	Li Yan
34	MF	CHN	Wang Jia'nan
35	FW	CHN	Min Junlin
42	DF	CHN	Zeng Chao

=== Reserve squad ===
Note: Flags indicate national team as defined under FIFA eligibility rules; some limited exceptions apply. Players may hold more than one non-FIFA nationality.

No.	Pos.	Nation	Player
36	DF	CHN	Wang Xinhui
37	DF	CHN	Li Zhe
38	FW	CHN	Chen Qi
39	MF	CHN	Huang Haoxuan
40	DF	CHN	Xiang Jiachi
41	GK	CHN	Zhao Bo
43	DF	CHN	Li Lei
44	MF	CHN	Chen Siyu
45	GK	CHN	Chen Jiahao

No.	Pos.	Nation	Player
46	MF	CHN	Ning An
47	MF	CHN	Tang Xin
48	FW	CHN	Wen Chao
49	MF	CHN	Wang Xuankai
50	DF	CHN	Luo Hao
51	MF	CHN	Gao Jiarun
52	GK	CHN	Xing Yu
53	MF	CHN	Chen Tang
55	MF	CHN	Ma Jun

=== Out on loan ===
Note: Flags indicate national team as defined under FIFA eligibility rules; some limited exceptions apply. Players may hold more than one non-FIFA nationality.

No. / Pos. / Nation / Player; 29 / FW / CHN / Zhang Shuo (at Tianjin Songjiang until 31 December 2015)	No. / Pos. / Nation / Player; 54 / MF / CHN / Pan Jiajun (at Meixian Hakka until 31 December 2015)

=== Coaching staff ===
==== Before July 22 ====
Position	Staff
Head coach	(Romania) Cosmin Contra
Team leader	(China) Li Bing
Assistant coaches	(Spain) Ángel López Pérez (China) Li Sheng
Fitness coach	(Spain) Alberto Peribánez Rivas
Goalkeeping coach	(China) Huang Hongtao (China) Li Yang
Technical Director	(Romania) Marius Nicolae
Physiotherapist	(Spain) Francesco Martinez
Team physician	(China) Yang Junchao (Spain) Enrique Pascual Muñoz

Source: Guangzhou R&F official website

==== July 22 to August 24 ====
Position	Staff
Head coach Team leader	(China) Li Bing
Assistant coaches	(China) Jiang Feng (China) Feng Feng (China) Zhang Yaokun
Goalkeeping coach	(China) Huang Hongtao (China) Li Yang
Team physician	(China) Yang Junchao
Performance manager & Scouting conductor	(United States) Bito Wu

Source: Guangzhou R&F official website

==== After August 24 ====
Position	Staff
Head coach	(Serbia) Dragan Stojković
Team leader	(China) Li Bing
Assistant coaches	(Japan) Katsuhito Kinoshi (Serbia) Žarko Đurović
Goalkeeping coach	(China) Huang Hongtao (China) Li Yang
Team physician	(China) Yang Junchao
Performance manager & Scouting conductor	(United States) Bito Wu

Source: Guangzhou R&F official website

== Transfers ==
=== Winter ===
In: Note: Flags indicate national team as defined under FIFA eligibility rules; some limited exceptions apply. Players may hold more than one non-FIFA nationality.

No.	Pos.	Nation	Player
10	MF	ESP	Míchel (from (Spain) Valencia)

Out: Note: Flags indicate national team as defined under FIFA eligibility rules; some limited exceptions apply. Players may hold more than one non-FIFA nationality.

No.	Pos.	Nation	Player
10	MF	BRA	Davi (to (China) Shanghai SIPG)

=== Summer ===
In: Note: Flags indicate national team as defined under FIFA eligibility rules; some limited exceptions apply. Players may hold more than one non-FIFA nationality.

No.	Pos.	Nation	Player
22	FW	COD	Jeremy Bokila (from (Russia) Terek Grozny)
31	MF	BRA	Renatinho (from (Japan) Kawasaki Frontale)

Out: Note: Flags indicate national team as defined under FIFA eligibility rules; some limited exceptions apply. Players may hold more than one non-FIFA nationality.

No.	Pos.	Nation	Player
8	MF	KOR	Park Jong-woo (to (United Arab Emirates) Al Jazira)
9	FW	MAR	Abderrazak Hamdallah (to (Qatar) El Jaish)

== Competitions ==
=== Chinese Super League ===
==== Results summary ====
Overall								Home						Away					
Pld	W	D	L	GF	GA	GD	Pts	W	D	L	GF	GA	GD	W	D	L	GF	GA	GD
22	5	7	10	28	32	−4	22	2	4	5	14	15	−1	3	3	5	14	17	−3

Last updated: 12 August 2015.
Source: Soccerway

==== Results ====
7 March 2015 1	Hangzhou Greentown	1–2	Guangzhou R&F	Hangzhou
15:35 UTC+8	Boulaâbi (yellow card) 44' (goal) 90'; Fan Xiaodong (yellow card) 79'	Summary	Aaron 53'; Hamdallah 79'; Tang Miao (yellow card) 83'	Stadium: Yellow Dragon Sports Center; Attendance: 17,833; Referee: Tan Hai

13 March 2015 2	Guangzhou R&F	0–1	Shanghai Greenland Shenhua	Guangzhou
19:35 (UTC+08)	Aaron (yellow card) 30'; Hamdallah (yellow card) 57'	Summary	Henrique 31'; Cao Yunding (yellow card) 45'; Wang Yun (yellow card) 90+5'	Stadium: Yuexiushan Stadium; Attendance: 11,093; Referee: Yejun Huang

22 March 2015 3	Shanghai SIPG	2–1	Guangzhou R&F	Shanghai
15:35 (UTC+08)	Yu Hai 37'; Yan Junling (yellow card) 78'; Hysén 81'; Cai Huikang (yellow card) 90+2'	Summary	Tang Miao (yellow card) 18'; Jin Yangyang (yellow card) 26'; Feng Zhuoyi (yellow card) 80'; Hamdallah 83'	Stadium: Shanghai Stadium; Attendance: 23,039; Referee: Qi Fan

3 April 2015 4	Guangzhou R&F	4–0	Guizhou Renhe	Guangzhou
19:30 UTC+8	Jiang Ning 25'; Jin Yangyang 35', 82'; Park Jong-woo (yellow card) 36'; Hamdallah 38'	Summary		Stadium: Yuexiushan Stadium; Attendance: 7,678; Referee: Gang Chen

12 April 2015 5	Shandong Luneng Taishan	1–2	Guangzhou R&F	Jinan
19:35 UTC+8	Aloísio (yellow card) 59' (yellow-red card) 70' Urso 67'	Summary	Wang Song 20'; Aaron (yellow card) 58'; Jiang Zhipeng (yellow card) 62'; Chang Feiya (yellow card) 63'; Jiang Ning 85'	Stadium: Jinan Olympic Sports Center Stadium; Attendance: 17,519; Referee: Yejun Huang

18 April 2015 6	Guangzhou R&F	0–0	Shijiazhuang Ever Bright	Guangzhou
19:30 UTC+8		Summary	Jianqing (yellow card) 57'; Shaoshun (yellow card) 73'	Stadium: Yuexiushan Stadium; Attendance: 8,383; Referee: Xiaohu Hei

26 April 2015 7	Changchun Yatai	1–2	Guangzhou R&F	Changchun
15:35 UTC+8	Huszti (yellow card) 73'; Zhe 90+5'	Summary	Chugui 15'; Feiya 54'; Yang (yellow card) 75'	Stadium: Development Area Stadium; Attendance: 15,326; Referee: Kun Ai

1 May 2015 8	Guangzhou R&F	0–0	Liaoning Whowin	Guangzhou
19:30 UTC+8	Song (yellow card) 45'; Hamdallah (yellow card) 69'	Summary	Chuka (yellow card) 28'; Tao (yellow card) 34'; Sheng (yellow card) 54'; Kim (yellow card) 67'	Stadium: Guangzhou Higher Education Mega Center Central Stadium; Attendance: 4,807; Referee: Baolong Guo

10 May 2015 9	Jiangsu Guoxin-Sainty	2–2	Guangzhou R&F	Nanjing
19:45 UTC+8	Hang (yellow card) 24'; Ang 57' (pen.); Kjartansson 87'	Summary	Ning 14'; Ang 73' (o.g.); Miao (yellow card) 77'; Míchel (yellow card) 84'	Stadium: Nanjing Olympic Sports Centre; Attendance: 26,134; Referee: Qi Fan

16 May 2015 10	Guangzhou R&F	1–3	Shanghai Shenxin	Guangzhou
19:35 UTC+8	Yang (yellow card) 10'; Samuel 47'; Yaokun (yellow card) 83'	Summary	Lim (yellow card) 56'; Miao 69' (o.g.); Chima 72'; Xunwei (yellow card) 90'; Yizhen 90+3'	Stadium: Guangzhou Higher Education Mega Center Central Stadium; Attendance: 5,063; Referee: Li Ma

23 May 2015 11	Guangzhou Evergrande Taobao	2–2	Guangzhou R&F	Guangzhou
20:00 (UTC+08)	Jiaqi (yellow card) 41'; Fang (yellow card) 60'; Lin 74' (pen.); Xuepeng (yellow card) 75'; Zhi (yellow card) 78'; Goulart 79'	Summary	Míchel 38', 86' (pen.); Samuel (yellow card) 72'	Stadium: Tianhe Stadium; Attendance: 43,790; Referee: Wang Di

31 May 2015 12	Tianjin Teda	2–0	Guangzhou R&F	Tianjin Olympic Center Stadium
19:35 UTC+8	Wei (yellow card) 36'; Barcos 43'; Qiuming 55'; Jia (yellow card) 82'	Summary	Zhipeng (yellow card) 15'; Hamdallah (yellow card) 67'	Stadium: Tianjin; Attendance: 39,128; Referee: Gang Chen

5 June 2015 13	Guangzhou R&F	0–0	Beijing Guoan	Guangzhou
19:35 UTC+8	Park (yellow card) 36'; Hamdallah (yellow card) 59'; Samuel (yellow card) 82'	Summary	Zheng (yellow card) 52'; Dabao (yellow card) 61'	Stadium: Guangzhou Higher Education Mega Center Central Stadium; Attendance: 9,378; Referee: Wang Di

20 June 2015 14	Chongqing Lifan	2–1	Guangzhou R&F	Chongqing
19:35 UTC+8	Miao 10' (o.g.); Gigliotti 21'; Weidong (yellow card) 43'; Dong (yellow card) 70'	Summary	Yan 4'; Yuan (yellow card) 72'	Stadium: Chongqing Olympic Sports Center; Attendance: 36,840; Referee: Xing Guan

24 June 2015 15	Guangzhou R&F	1–2	Henan Jianye	Guangzhou
19:35 UTC+8	Samuel 72'	Summary	Gomes (yellow card) 22'; Cao (yellow card) 42'; Patiño 70'; Ivo 87'; Jianjun (yellow card) 90+4'	Stadium: Guangzhou Higher Education Mega Center Central Stadium; Attendance: 5,134; Referee: Gang Chen

28 June 2015 16	Guangzhou R&F	2–0	Hangzhou Greentown	Guangzhou
19:35 UTC+8	Lin (yellow card) 40'; Feiya (yellow card) 59'; Samuel 64' (pen.); Míchel 82'	Summary	Antar (yellow card) 16'; Chen (yellow card) 25'; Xiaodong (yellow card) 77'	Stadium: Guangzhou Higher Education Mega Center Central Stadium; Attendance: 5,798; Referee: Zhe Wang

4 July 2015 17	Shanghai Greenland Shenhua	1–0	Guangzhou R&F	Shanghai
19:45 (UTC+08)	Sissoko (yellow card) 20'; Cahill 75'	Summary	Samuel (yellow card) 32'; Míchel (yellow card) 82'	Stadium: Hongkou Football Stadium; Attendance: 16,587; Referee: Baolong Guo

12 July 2015 18	Guangzhou R&F	2–3	Shanghai SIPG	Guangzhou
19:35 UTC+8	Jang (yellow card) 37' (goal) 74'; Lin (yellow card) 39'; Bokila 77'	Summary	Conca 11', 88'; Davi (yellow card) 41'; Xiang (yellow card) 79'; Jiajie 90+1' (yellow card) 90+2'	Stadium: Yuexiushan Stadium; Attendance: 11,687; Referee: Jun Li

16 July 2015 19	Guizhou Renhe	2–2	Guangzhou R&F	Guiyang
19:35 UTC+8	Renliang (yellow card) 45'; Weihui (yellow card) 56'; Santos 61', 88'; Salihović (yellow card) 64'	Summary	Yuan (yellow card) 19'; Jang (yellow card) 64'; Samuel 70', 75'; Feiya (yellow card) 72'	Stadium: Guiyang Olympic Sports Center; Attendance: 16,834; Referee: Ning Ma

19 July 2015 20	Guangzhou R&F	2–4	Shandong Luneng Taishan	Guangzhou
19:35 UTC+8	Míchel 13'; Samuel 76' (pen.); Yangyang (yellow card) 85'	Summary	Qiang 20'; Yongpo 39'; Tardelli 49'; Lin (yellow card) 73'; Junmin 82'	Stadium: Yuexiushan Stadium; Attendance: 7,789; Referee: Ming Fu

25 July 2015 21	Shijiazhuang Ever Bright	1–0	Guangzhou R&F	Shijiazhuang
19:35 UTC+8	Jihong (yellow card) 41'; Rondón (yellow card) 59'; Chao 85'; Bo (yellow card) 89'	Summary		Stadium: Yutong International Sports Center; Attendance: 26,039; Referee: Di Wang

11 August 2015 22	Guangzhou R&F	2–2	Changchun Yatai	Guangzhou
20:00 (UTC+08)	Lin 57'; Bokila 76' (yellow card) 77'; Yaokun (yellow card) 90+3'	Summary	Guang 7'; Zhenyu (yellow card) 12' (goal) 83'; Shang (yellow card) 36'	Stadium: Yuexiushan Stadium; Attendance: 7,789; Referee: Xing Guan

16 August 2015 23	Liaoning Whowin	1–0	Guangzhou R&F	Panjin
19:35 UTC+8	Ogbu 7'; Bicfalvi (yellow card) 21'; Sheng (yellow card) 44'; Haifeng (yellow card) 61'	Summary	Yan (yellow card) 25'	Stadium: Panjin Jinxiu Stadium

23 August 2015 24	Guangzhou R&F	v	Jiangsu Guoxin-Sainty	Guangzhou
19:35 UTC+8		[ Summary]		Stadium: Yuexiushan Stadium

==== Table ====
Pos	Team	Pld	W	D	L	GF	GA	GD	Pts	Qualification or relegation
12	Liaoning Whowin	30	7	10	13	30	46	−16	31 (Note: Head-to-head points: Liaoning Whowin 8 pts, Tianjin TEDA 4 pts, Guangzhou R&F 4 pts; Head-to-head results between Tianjin and Guangzhou R&F — Tianjin: 3 pts, +1 goal difference, Guangzhou R&F: 3 pts −1 goal difference.)	
13	Tianjin TEDA	30	7	10	13	39	46	−7	31	
14	Guangzhou R&F	30	8	7	15	35	41	−6	31	
15	Guizhou Renhe (R)	30	7	8	15	39	52	−13	29	Relegation to League One
16	Shanghai Shenxin (R)	30	4	5	21	30	70	−40	17	Relegation to League One

Source: sports.sina.com (in Chinese)
Rules for classification: 1) points; 2) head-to-head points; 3) head-to-head goals scored; 4) head-to-head away goals scored; 5)goal difference; 6) number of goals scored; 7) disciplinary points (1 point for each yellow card, 3 points for each red card). Head-to-Head: Only used at the end of the season when two or more teams need the head-to-head rules to break a tie.
(R) Relegated

=== Chinese FA Cup ===
13 May 2015 Third Round	Nei Mongol Zhongyou	0–1	Guangzhou R&F	Hohhot
19:35 (UTC+08)		[ Summary]	Ye Chugui 67'	Stadium: Hohhot City Stadium

8 July 2015 Fourth Round	Shanghai SIPG	2–1	Guangzhou R&F	Shanghai
19:45 (UTC+08)	Conca 62' (pen.); Wu Lei 70'	[ Summary]	Wang Shenchao 25' (o.g.)	Stadium: Shanghai Stadium; Referee: Zhou Gang

=== AFC Champions League ===
==== Qualifying play-off ====
10 February 2015 Preliminary round 2	Guangzhou R&F (China)	3–0	(Singapore) Warriors	Guangzhou, China
19:35 (UTC+08)	Jiang Zhipeng 53'; Jang Hyun-soo 60'; Zhang Shuo 75'	Report	Jaffar (yellow card) 3'; Wheeler (yellow card) 85'	Stadium: Yuexiushan Stadium; Attendance: 7,883; Referee: Minoru Tōjō (Japan)

17 February 2015 Play-off round	Central Coast Mariners (Australia)	1–3	(China) Guangzhou R&F	Gosford, Australia
16:30 (UTC+08)	Fitzgerald (yellow card) 63'; Poscoliero (yellow card) 78'; Trifiro 90+2'	Report	Jiang Ning 8'; Tang Miao (yellow card) 13'; Park Jong-woo (yellow card) 50'; Lu Lin 57'; Jiang Zhipeng (yellow card) 88'; Rose 89' (o.g.)	Stadium: Central Coast Stadium; Attendance: 2,776; Referee: Kim Dong-jin (South Korea)

==== Group stage ====
Pos	Team	Pld	W	D	L	GF	GA	GD	Pts	Qualification
1	(Japan) Gamba Osaka	6	3	1	2	10	7	+3	10	Advance to knockout stage
2	(South Korea) Seongnam FC	6	3	1	2	7	5	+2	10	Advance to knockout stage
3	(Thailand) Buriram United	6	3	1	2	12	7	+5	10	
4	(China) Guangzhou R&F	6	1	1	4	3	13	−10	4	

Source: AFC
Rules for classification: Group stage tiebreakers

24 February 2015 1	Gamba Osaka (Japan)	0–2	(China) Guangzhou R&F	Suita, Japan
18:00 (UTC+08)	Patric (yellow card) 70'; Kotaro (yellow card) 74'; Endō (yellow card) 79'	Report	Lu Lin (yellow card) 2'; Hamdallah 10'; Wang Song 80'; Park Jong-woo (yellow card) 82'	Stadium: Osaka Expo '70 Stadium; Attendance: 8,848; Referee: Mohsen Torky (Iran)

3 March 2015 2	Guangzhou R&F (China)	1–2	(Thailand) Buriram United	Guangzhou, China
19:30 (UTC+08)	Lu Lin 27' (yellow card) 55'	Report	Namwiset (yellow card) 32'; Go Seul-ki 44'; Nuchnum (yellow card) 52'; Macena 90'	Stadium: Yuexiushan Stadium; Attendance: 9,308; Referee: Mohd Amirul Izwan Bin Yaacob (Malaysia)

17 March 2015 3	Guangzhou R&F (China)	0–1	(South Korea) Seongnam	Guangzhou, China
19:30 (UTC+08)	Hamdallah (yellow card) 23'; Chang Feiya (yellow card) 58'; Tang Miao (yellow card) 71'; Jang Hyun-soo (yellow card) 87' (yellow-red card) 87'	Report	Hwang Ui-jo 27'; Lim Chae-min (yellow card) 32'; Kim Cheol-ho (yellow card) 60'	Stadium: Yuexiushan Stadium; Attendance: 8,638; Referee: Fahad Al-Marri (Qatar)

7 April 2015 4	Seongnam (South Korea)	0–0	(China) Guangzhou R&F	Seongnam, South Korea
18:30 (UTC+08)	Kim (yellow card) 36'	Report	Lu Lin (yellow card) 27'; Jiang Zhipeng (yellow card) 90+2'	Stadium: Tancheon Sports Complex; Attendance: 5,777; Referee: Nawaf Shukralla (Bahrain)

22 April 2015 5	Guangzhou R&F (China)	0–5	(Japan) Gamba Osaka	Guangzhou, China
19:30 (UTC+08)	Zhang Yaokun (yellow card) 48' (yellow-red card) 82'; Chang Feiya (yellow card) 72'; Jiang Zhipeng (yellow card) 79'; Li Yan (yellow card) 82'	Report	Patric 14', 45'; Abe 44', 68'; Usami 70'; Iwashita (yellow card) 82'; Kotaro (yellow card) 82'	Stadium: Yuexiushan Stadium; Attendance: 8,647; Referee: Adham Makhadmeh (Jordan)

6 May 2015 6	Buriram United (Thailand)	5–0	(China) Guangzhou R&F	Buriram, Thailand
18:15 (UTC+08)	Diogo 12', 38', 56'; Túñez 36'; Macena 59'	Report	Jin Yangyang (yellow card) 42'; Feng Zhuoyi (yellow card) 57'; Zhang Shuo (yellow card) 75'	Stadium: New I-Mobile Stadium; Attendance: 17,331; Referee: Ammar Al-Jeneibi (United Arab Emirates)

== Squad statistics ==
As of match played 16 August 2015

=== Appearances and goals ===
No.	Pos	Nat	Player	Total		Super League		FA Cup		Champions League	
No.	Pos	Nat	Player	Apps	Goals	Apps	Goals	Apps	Goals	Apps	Goals
1	GK	(China) CHN	Cheng Yuelei	6	0	6	0	0	0	0	0
3	DF	(China) CHN	Yu Yang	14	0	12+1	0	0	0	1	0
4	DF	(China) CHN	Jin Yangyang	16	2	10+2	2	0	0	3+1	0
5	DF	(China) CHN	Zhang Yaokun	30	0	22+1	0	0	0	7	0
6	MF	(China) CHN	Wang Song	30	2	20+3	1	0	0	7	1
7	FW	(China) CHN	Jiang Ning	27	3	19+1	3	0	0	7	0
10	MF	(Spain) ESP	Míchel	29	4	15+6	4	0	0	7+1	0
11	MF	(China) CHN	Jiang Zhipeng	25	1	18	0	0	0	7	1
12	GK	(China) CHN	Zhang Shichang	1	0	0	0	0	0	1	0
13	MF	(China) CHN	Ye Chugui	16	1	4+9	1	0	0	0+3	0
14	DF	(China) CHN	Li Jianhua	4	0	1+2	0	0	0	1	0
15	DF	(South Korea) KOR	Jang Hyun-soo	16	2	10+1	1	0	0	5	1
16	MF	(China) CHN	Feng Zhuoyi	5	0	0+3	0	0	0	1+1	0
18	MF	(China) CHN	Zhang Yuan	22	0	8+8	0	0	0	2+4	0
20	MF	(China) CHN	Tang Miao	24	0	17	0	0	0	7	0
21	FW	(China) CHN	Chang Feiya	25	1	6+12	1	0	0	2+5	0
22	FW	(Democratic Republic of the Congo) COD	Jeremy Bokila	7	2	6+1	2	0	0	0	0
23	MF	(China) CHN	Lu Lin	26	3	12+7	1	0	0	6+1	2
25	FW	(Nigeria) NGR	Aaron Samuel	15	7	14+1	7	0	0	0	0
26	DF	(China) CHN	Zhang Chenlong	5	0	4	0	0	0	1	0
27	GK	(China) CHN	Liu Dianzuo	24	0	17	0	0	0	7	0
30	DF	(China) CHN	Fu Yunlong	1	0	0	0	0	0	0+1	0
31	MF	(Brazil) BRA	Renatinho	4	0	3+1	0	0	0	0	0
33	MF	(China) CHN	Li Yan	17	1	9+4	1	0	0	2+2	0
35	FW	(China) CHN	Min Junlin	5	0	0+3	0	0	0	1+1	0
Players who away from the club on loan:
29	FW	(China) CHN	Zhang Shuo	5	1	0+1	0	0	0	1+3	1
Players who appeared for Shanghai Greenland Shenhua who left during the season:
8	MF	(South Korea) KOR	Park Jong-woo	17	0	11	0	0	0	6	0
9	FW	(Morocco) MAR	Abderrazak Hamdallah	16	4	9+1	3	0	0	6	1

=== Goal scorers ===
Place	Position	Nation	Number	Name	Super League	FA Cup	Champions League	Total
1	FW	(Nigeria)	25	Aaron Samuel	7	0	0	7
2	MF	(Spain)	10	Míchel	4	0	0	4
2	FW	(China)	7	Jiang Ning	3	0	1	4
2	FW	(Morocco)	9	Abderrazak Hamdallah	3	0	1	4
5	MF	(China)	23	Lu Lin	1	0	2	3
5				Own goal	1	1	1	3
7	FW	(Democratic Republic of the Congo)	22	Jeremy Bokila	2	0	0	2
7	DF	(China)	4	Jin Yangyang	2	0	0	2
7	MF	(China)	13	Ye Chugui	1	1	0	2
7	DF	(South Korea)	15	Jang Hyun-soo	1	0	1	2
7	MF	(China)	6	Wang Song	1	0	1	2
12	FW	(China)	21	Chang Feiya	1	0	0	1
12	MF	(China)	33	Li Yan	1	0	0	1
12	DF	(China)	11	Jiang Zhipeng	0	0	1	1
12	FW	(China)	29	Zhang Shuo	0	0	1	1
				TOTALS	35	2	9	1
