= 2014 Guangzhou R&F F.C. season =

Guangzhou R&F 2014
- Manager: Sven-Göran Eriksson
- Stadium: Yuexiushan Stadium
- Super League: 3rd
- FA Cup: 4th Round
- Average home league attendance: 11,487

The 2014 Guangzhou R&F season is the 4th year in Guangzhou R&F's existence and its 4th season in the Chinese football league, also its 3rd season in the top flight.

== Coaching staff ==
Position	Staff
Head coach	(Sweden) Sven-Göran Eriksson
Team leader	(China) Li Bing
Assistant coaches	(Sweden) Roger Palmgren
Assistant coaches	(Denmark) Mads Davidsen
Fitness coach	(South Africa) Divan Augustyn
Goalkeeping coach	(China) Huang Hongtao
Team physician	(Canada) Jin Ri
Team physician	(Brazil) Cleiton Victorino
Team physician	(China) Fan Bihua

== Squad ==
=== Winter ===
Note: Flags indicate national team as defined under FIFA eligibility rules; some limited exceptions apply. Players may hold more than one non-FIFA nationality.

No.	Pos.	Nation	Player
1	GK	CHN	Cheng Yuelei
3	DF	CHN	Liu Cheng
5	DF	CHN	Zhang Yaokun (captain)
6	DF	CHN	Xu Bo
7	FW	CHN	Jiang Ning
8	MF	KOR	Park Jong-woo
9	FW	MAR	Abderrazak Hamdallah
10	MF	BRA	Davi
11	DF	CHN	Jiang Zhipeng
12	GK	CHN	Zhang Shichang
13	MF	CHN	Wu Weian
14	DF	CHN	Li Jianhua
15	DF	KOR	Jang Hyun-Soo
16	DF	CHN	Zhang Ao
17	DF	CHN	Li Zhe
18	FW	CHN	Zhang Yuan

No.	Pos.	Nation	Player
19	MF	CHN	Wang Xiaolong
20	MF	CHN	Tang Miao
21	FW	CHN	Chang Feiya
22	MF	CHN	Wang Xinhui
23	MF	CHN	Lu Lin
26	MF	CHN	Wu Pingfeng
27	FW	DEN	Ken Ilsø
28	DF	CHN	Gao Jiulong
29	FW	CHN	Zhang Shuo
30	DF	CHN	Fu Yunlong
32	GK	CHN	Wang Lüe
33	MF	CHN	Li Yan
36	MF	CHN	Zhu Baojie
37	DF	CHN	Feng Zhuoyi
38	FW	CHN	Chen Qi
40	GK	CHN	Pei Chensong

=== Summer ===
Note: Flags indicate national team as defined under FIFA eligibility rules; some limited exceptions apply. Players may hold more than one non-FIFA nationality.

No.	Pos.	Nation	Player
1	GK	CHN	Cheng Yuelei
3	DF	CHN	Liu Cheng
5	DF	CHN	Zhang Yaokun (captain)
6	DF	CHN	Xu Bo
7	FW	CHN	Jiang Ning
8	MF	KOR	Park Jong-woo
9	FW	MAR	Abderrazak Hamdallah
10	MF	BRA	Davi
11	DF	CHN	Jiang Zhipeng
12	GK	CHN	Zhang Shichang
14	DF	CHN	Li Jianhua
15	DF	KOR	Jang Hyun-Soo
16	DF	CHN	Zhang Ao
17	DF	CHN	Li Zhe
18	FW	CHN	Zhang Yuan
19	MF	CHN	Wang Xiaolong

No.	Pos.	Nation	Player
20	MF	CHN	Tang Miao
21	FW	CHN	Chang Feiya
22	MF	CHN	Wang Xinhui
23	MF	CHN	Lu Lin
25	FW	NGA	Aaron Samuel
26	MF	CHN	Wu Pingfeng
29	FW	CHN	Zhang Shuo
30	DF	CHN	Fu Yunlong
32	GK	CHN	Wang Lüe
33	MF	CHN	Li Yan
35	FW	CHN	Min Junlin
36	MF	CHN	Zhu Baojie
37	DF	CHN	Feng Zhuoyi
38	FW	CHN	Chen Qi
40	GK	CHN	Pei Chensong
53	DF	CHN	Zhao Ming
