= 2012 Guangzhou R&F F.C. season =

Guangzhou R&F F.C.
- Chairman: Zhang Li
- Manager: Sérgio Farias
- Stadium: Yuexiushan Stadium; Guangzhou Higher Education Mega Center Central Stadium
- Super League: 7th
- FA Cup: Fourth Round
- Average home league attendance: 8,460
Home colours	Away colours

The 2012 Guangzhou R&F F.C. season is Guangzhou's 1st season in the Chinese Super League since 2010. Guangzhou will also be competing in the Chinese FA Cup.

== Coaching staff ==
Position	Staff
Head coach	(Brazil) Sérgio Farias
Team leader	(China) Li Shubin
Assistant coaches	(Brazil) Luis Antonio Inarra
Assistant coaches	(China) Zhang Zengqun (to 12 June 2012)
Assistant coaches	(China) Zhu Bo (to 12 June 2012)
Fitness coaches	(Brazil) Matheus Henrique
Fitness coaches	(China) Zou Hongjie
Goalkeeping coaches	(Brazil) Marcos Antônio Leme
Goalkeeping coaches	(China) Li Xianzhong (to 12 June 2012)
Team physician	(Brazil) Cleiton Victorino

== Players ==
As of 5 March 2012

Note: Flags indicate national team as defined under FIFA eligibility rules; some limited exceptions apply. Players may hold more than one non-FIFA nationality.

No.	Pos.	Nation	Player
1	GK	CHN	Cheng Yuelei
2	DF	CHN	Sui Donglu
3	DF	CHN	Liu Cheng
4	DF	CHN	Li Wenbo
5	DF	CHN	Wang Bin
6	DF	CHN	Xu Bo
7	MF	CHN	Yu Guijun
8	MF	BRA	Jumar
9	FW	CHN	Wen Chao
10	MF	BRA	Davi
11	FW	BRA	Rafael Coelho
12	GK	CHN	Shi Xiaotian
13	MF	CHN	Wu Wei'an
15	MF	CHN	Liang Yanfeng
16	DF	CHN	Zhang Ao
17	DF	CHN	Li Zhe (captain)

No.	Pos.	Nation	Player
18	FW	CHN	Zhang Yuan
19	MF	CHN	Pan Chi
20	MF	CHN	Tang Miao
21	MF	CHN	Gao Zengxiang
22	MF	CHN	Wang Zihua
23	MF	CHN	Lu Lin
24	MF	CHN	Li Lingwei
26	DF	CHN	Zhao Ming
27	DF	CHN	Gao Jiulong
28	MF	CHN	Huang Long
29	FW	CHN	Zhang Shuo
30	GK	CHN	Sun Ce
31	FW	BRA	Leonardo
32	GK	CHN	Wang Lüe
35	MF	AUS	Rostyn Griffiths
36	FW	CHN	Men Yang

== Competitions ==
=== Chinese Super League ===
==== League table ====
Pos	Team	Pld	W	D	L	GF	GA	GD	Pts
5	Dalian Aerbin	30	11	11	8	51	46	+5	44 (Note: Dalian 1–2 Changchun; Changchun 1–2 Dalian)
6	Changchun Yatai	30	12	8	10	37	40	−3	44
7	Guangzhou R&F	30	13	3	14	47	49	−2	42
8	Tianjin TEDA	30	10	10	10	29	30	−1	40
9	Shanghai Shenhua	30	8	14	8	39	34	+5	38

Source: Chinese Super League (in Chinese)
Rules for classification: 1) points; 2) goal difference; 3) number of goals scored; 4) head-to-head goals scored; 5) goal difference; 6) goals scored; 7) disciplinary points (1 point for each yellow card, 3 points for each red card). Head-to-Head: Only used at the end of the season when two or more teams need the head-to-head rules to break a tie.

==== Matches ====
10 March 2012 1	Guangzhou R&F	3 - 1	Beijing Guoan	Guangzhou, Guangdong
15:45 UTC+8	Li Zhe 14'; Wu Wei'an 54'; Davi 90+5'	Report	Reinaldo 90+4'	Stadium: Yuexiushan Stadium; Attendance: 12,252; Referee: Matthew Gillett (Australia)

16 March 2012 2	Guangzhou R&F	2 - 0	Guangzhou Evergrande	Guangzhou, Guangdong
18:00 UTC+8	Zhang Shuo 13' (pen.); Zhang Yuan 86'	Report		Stadium: Yuexiushan Stadium; Attendance: 19,217; Referee: Sun Baojie

24 March 2012 3	Shanghai Shenhua	1 - 0	Guangzhou R&F	Shanghai
19:45 UTC+8	Wu Xi (yellow card) 11'; Griffiths (yellow card) 21'; Wang Fei (yellow card) 47'; Cao Yunding 84'; Wang Dalei (yellow card) 90+3'	Report	Gao Zengxiang (yellow card) 16'; Liu Cheng (yellow card) 21'; Xu Bo (yellow card) 60'; Zhang Yuan (yellow card) 77'	Stadium: Hongkou Football Stadium; Attendance: 16,653; Referee: Ma Ning

1 April 2012 4	Guangzhou R&F	1 - 0	Hangzhou Greentown	Guangzhou, Guangdong
16:45 UTC+8	Jumar (yellow card) 45'; Davi 47' (pen.); Gao Zengxiang (yellow card) 86'	Report	Fabrício (yellow card) 30' (yellow-red card) 51'; Du Wei (yellow card) 34'; Xie Zhiyu (yellow card) 45'	Stadium: Yuexiushan Stadium; Attendance: 5,332; Referee: Tao Rancheng

8 April 2012 Week 5	Tianjin Teda	1–2	Guangzhou R&F	TEDA Football Stadium
16:30	Ars 76'; Chen Tao (yellow card) 80'; Mao Biao (yellow card) 90'	Report	Xu Bo (yellow card) 15'; Gao Zengxiang (yellow card) 46'; Davi 49'; Rafael Coelho 51'; Lu Lin (yellow card) 70'	Attendance: 11,469; Referee: Huang Yejun

15 April 2012 Week 6	Guangzhou R&F	1–0	Dalian Shide	Yuexiushan Stadium
18:45	Griffiths 70'	Report	Yan Xiangchuang (yellow card) 30'; Chamanga (yellow card) 31'; Lü Peng (yellow card) 63'	Attendance: 5,953; Referee: Shi Zhenlu

21 April 2012 Week 7	Shandong Luneng	2–1	Guangzhou R&F	Shandong Provincial Stadium
20:30	Roda Antar 23'; Gilberto Macena 30' (yellow card) 33'; Ma Xingyu (yellow card) 41'; Zheng Zheng (yellow card) 73'; Lü Zheng (yellow card) 90'	Report	Xu Bo (yellow card) 8'; Jumar (yellow card) 25'; Rafael Coelho (yellow card) 50'; Zhang Yuan 83'	Attendance: 21,718; Referee: Fan Qi

28 April 2012 Week 8	Guangzhou R&F	2–1	Liaoning Whowin	Yuexiushan Stadium
16:45	Rafael Coelho 73'; Jumar 77' (yellow card) 82'	Report	Zhang Ye (yellow card) 30'; Yang Xu (yellow card) 40'; Wang Shouting (yellow card) 81'; Brandán (yellow card) 83'; Junzhe 89'

5 May 2012 Week 9	Shanghai Shenxin	4–2	Guangzhou R&F	Jinshan Sports Centre
21:00	Salley 13'; Anselmo 53', 81'; Zuojun (yellow card) 54'; Wang Yun 72'	Report	Griffiths (yellow card) 29'; Davi 41' (pen.); Tang Miao (yellow card) 70'; Rafael Coelho 90+1'

13 May 2012 Week 10	Guangzhou R&F	2–1	Henan Jianye	Yuexiushan Stadium
18:45	Rafael Coelho 23'; Gao Zengxiang (yellow card) 24'; Xu Bo (yellow card) 33'; Davi 44'; Liu Cheng (yellow card) 57'	Report	Xiyang (yellow card) 53'; Bi Jinhao 63'; Zhang Li (footballer born 1989) (yellow card) 66'

19 May 2012 Week 11	Guizhou Renhe	3–0	Guangzhou R&F	Guiyang Olympic Sports Center
20:30	Qu Bo 18' (pen.), 32'; Li Chunyu (yellow card) 37'; Muslimović 84' (yellow card) 84'	Report	Zhang Yuan (yellow card) 16'; Liu Cheng (yellow card) 22'; Jumar (yellow card) 32'

27 May 2012 Week 12	Guangzhou R&F	5–1	Changchun Yatai	Yuexiushan Stadium
18:30	Rafael Coelho 3', 28', 68'; Jumar (yellow card) 7'; Li Zhe 29' (o.g.); Davi 44', 90'	Report	Ljubinković (yellow card) 28'; Li Zhe 29' (o.g.); Cássio (yellow card) 71'; Lü Jianjun (red card) 78'

16 June 2012 Week 13	Dalian Aerbin	2–1	Guangzhou R&F	Jinzhou Stadium
16:30	Yu Dabao (yellow card) 45'; Canales 49'; Wang Hongyou 54'; Yin Lu (yellow card) 71'	Report	Davi (red card) 9'; Jumar (yellow card) 26'; Griffiths (yellow card) 37'; Li Zhe (yellow card) 45'; Rafael Coelho 52'

23 June 2012 Week 14	Guangzhou R&F	2–3	Qingdao Jonoon	Yuexiushan Stadium
21:00	Tang Miao 6'; Rafael Coelho 45+4'	Report	Ibrahimov 9'; Léo San 15'; Zhu Jianrong 59'	Attendance: 4,344; Referee: (China) Tao Rancheng

1 July 2012 Week 15	Jiangsu Sainty	3–1	Guangzhou R&F	Nanjing Olympic Sports Center
20:40	Eleílson (yellow card) 13' (goal) 61'; Ren Hang (yellow card) 25'; Dănălache 28', 88'; Liu Jianye (yellow card) 74'	Report	Rafael Coelho 18'; Li Wenbo (yellow card) 27'; Griffiths (yellow card) 86'	Attendance: 24,971; Referee: (China) Wang Zhe

7 July 2012 Week 16	Beijing Guoan	1–0	Guangzhou R&F	Workers Stadium
20:30	Zhou Ting (yellow card) 58'; Zhang Xinxin (yellow card) 60'; Shao Jiayi 64' (yellow card) 74'; Xu Liang (yellow card) 79'; Xu Yunlong (yellow card) 89'	Report	Zhao Ming (yellow card) 10'; Li Wenbo (yellow card) 42'; Davi (yellow card) 89'	Attendance: 42,668; Referee: (China) Zhang Zhengping

15 July 2012 Week 17	Guangzhou Evergrande	0–1	Guangzhou R&F	Tianhe Stadium
20:35	Zheng Zhi (yellow card) 9'; Zhang Linpeng (yellow card) 32'	Report	Wu Weian (yellow card) 25'; Tang Miao (yellow card) 33'; Yakubu 86'	Attendance: 39,991; Referee: (China) Tao Rancheng

22 July 2012 Week 18	Guangzhou R&F	1–1	Shanghai Shenhua	Yuexiushan Stadium
20:30	Moisés 22' (o.g.); Griffiths (yellow card) 40'; Li Wenbo (yellow card) 49'	Report	Moreno (yellow card) 49'; Cao Yunding 68'	Attendance: 11,235; Referee: (China) Huang Yejun

28 July 2012 Week 19	Hangzhou Greentown	2–2	Guangzhou R&F	Yellow Dragon Stadium
20:35	Wang Song 40'; Renatinho 61'	Report	Lu Lin (yellow card) 54'; Yakubu 62'; Xu Bo (yellow card) 79'; Zhang Yuan 87'

5 August 2012 Week 20	Guangzhou R&F	1–2	Tianjin Teda	Yuexiushan Stadium
20:30	Yakubu 22'; Davi (yellow card) 83'	Summary	Cao Yang 36'; Du Zhenyu (yellow card) 39'; Ars 42'; Nie Tao (yellow card) 65'; Šumulikoski (yellow card) 70'	Attendance: 5,601; Referee: (China) Xu Fuxin

11 August 2012 Week 21	Dalian Shide	4–1	Guangzhou R&F	Jinzhou Stadium
20:00	Adriano 14', 90+1' (yellow card) 57'; Yan Feng (yellow card) 34'; Kamburov 67' (pen.); Park Dong-Hyuk 80'	Summary	Xu Bo (yellow card) 28'; Griffiths (yellow card) 32'; Li Yan (yellow card) 51'; Davi 53'; Yakubu (yellow card) 64'; Tang Miao (yellow card) 79'	Attendance: 6,751; Referee: (China) Tao Rancheng

19 August 2012 Week 22	Guangzhou R&F	4–2	Shandong Luneng	Yuexiushan Stadium
20:30	Yakubu 9' (yellow card) 88'; Rafael Coelho 19', 49'; Li Yan (yellow card) 43'; Zhang Yuan 45'	Summary	Wang Yongpo 2'; Cui Peng (yellow card) 24' (yellow-red card) 44'; Ortigoza 59'	Attendance: 8,558; Referee: (China) Wang Jin

26 August 2012 Week 23	Liaoning Whowin	1–2	Guangzhou R&F	Tiexi New District Sports Center
20:30	Grozdanoski 28'; Yang Xu (yellow card) 48'	Summary	Sui Donglu (yellow card) 19'; Yakubu 53', 69'; Davi (yellow card) 59'; Gao Zengxiang (yellow card) 88'; Rafael Coelho (yellow card) 90+2'

16 September 2012 Week 24	Guangzhou R&F	3–2	Shanghai Shenxin	Yuexiushan Stadium
20:30	Yakubu 32'; Rafael Coelho 66' (pen.) (yellow card) 69'; Sui Donglu (yellow card) 83'; Li Zhe 90+2'	Summary	Wang Jiayu (yellow card) 41'; Wang Yun 45'; Anselmo 47'; Antônio Flávio (yellow card) 61'; Zou Zhongting (yellow card) 67'; Salley (red card) 69'; Zhu Baojie (yellow card) 78'	Attendance: 6,012; Referee: (China) Xu Fuxin

22 September 2012 Week 25	Henan Jianye	3–1	Guangzhou R&F	Zhengzhou Hanghai Stadium
20:45	Chansa (yellow card) 27'; Adaílton (yellow card) 28'; Sui Donglu 53' (o.g.); Wang Jia'nan (yellow card) 80'; Zhang Lu 84'; Katongo 89'	Summary	Rafael Coelho 21'; Griffiths (yellow card) 38'; Liu Cheng (yellow card) 82'	Attendance: 14,428; Referee: (China) Hai Tan

30 September 2012 Week 26	Guangzhou R&F	1–0	Guizhou Renhe	Yuexiushan Stadium
18:00	lu Lin (yellow card) 45'; Yakubu 80'	Summary

7 October 2012 Week 27	Changchun Yatai	2–1	Guangzhou R&F	Development Area Stadium
16:30	Wang Dong 28' (yellow card) 37'; Liu Weidong 69'; Pei Shuai (yellow card) 73'; Marquinhos (yellow card) 78'	Summary	Yakubu (yellow card) 31'; Zhang Yuan 35'

21 October 2012 Week 28	Guangzhou R&F	–	Dalian Aerbin	Yuexiushan Stadium
17:00

27 October 2012 Week 29	Qingdao Jonoon	–	Guangzhou R&F	Qingdao Tiantai Stadium
16:30

3 November 2012 Week 30	Guangzhou R&F	–	Jiangsu Sainty	Yuexiushan Stadium
14:30

=== Chinese FA Cup ===
27 June 2012 3	Guangzhou R&F	3–2	Hunan Xiangtao	Guangzhou
21:00		Report		Stadium: Yuexiushan Stadium

18 July 2012 4	Liaoning Whowin	4–3	Guangzhou R&F	Tiexi
20:30	Trifunović 15'; Zhao Junzhe 34' (pen.); Liu Yang 77'; Yang Yu 90'		Wu Weian 13'; Lu Lin 24'; Xu Bo (red card) 45'; Yakubu 56'	Stadium: Tiexi New District Sports Center
