= 2011 Guangzhou R&F F.C. season =

Guangzhou R&F 2011
- Head coach: Li Shubin
- Stadium: Dongguan Nancheng Stadium; Yuexiushan Stadium
- League One: 2nd
- FA Cup: 2nd Round
- Top goalscorer: League: Zhang Shuo (8 goals); All: Zhang Shuo (8 goals)
Home colours	Away colours

== Coaching staff ==
Position	Staff
Head coach	(China) Li Shubin
Assistant coaches	(China) Zhang Zengqun
Assistant coaches	(China) Zhu Bo
Fitness coach	(China) Zou Hongjie
Goalkeeping coach	(China) Li Xianzhong

== Competitions ==
Win Draw Loss

=== China League One ===
Pos	Team	Pld	W	D	L	GF	GA	GD	Pts	Promotion or relegation
1	Dalian Aerbin (C, P)	26	16	6	4	45	20	+25	54	Promotion to Chinese Super League
2	Guangzhou R&F (P)	26	13	8	5	36	27	+9	47	Promotion to Chinese Super League
3	Guangdong Sunray Cave	26	13	7	6	42	29	+13	46	
4	Hunan Billows	26	12	6	8	39	35	+4	42	
5	Shenyang Dongjin	26	9	10	7	32	25	+7	37	

Updated to match(es) played on 30 October 2011. Source: CSL1 Site on Sohu.com
Rules for classification: 1st points; 2nd head-to-head points; 3rd head-to-head goal difference; 4th head-to-head goals scored; 5th goal difference; 6th goals scored; 7th disciplinary points (1 point for each yellow card, 3 points for each red card).
(C) Champions; (P) Promoted

==== Results by round ====
Round	1	2	3	4	5	6	7	8	9	10	11	12	13	14	15	16	17	18	19	20	21	22	23	24	25	26
Position	7	10	14	11	9	7	7	7	7	7	7	3	3	3	3	3	3	3	3	3	3	3	2	2	2	2

==== League Matches ====
27 March 2011 1	Shenzhen Phoenix	1 - 1	Shenyang Dongjin	Dongguan, Guangdong
15:30 UTC+8	Johnson Macaba 12'		Sablic 59'	Stadium: Nancheng Stadium; Referee: Guo Hao

3 April 2011 2	Shenzhen Phoenix	0 - 2	Guangdong Sunray Cave	Dongguan, Guangdong
15:30 UTC+8			Yin Hongbo 50'; Awal 75'	Stadium: Nancheng Stadium; Referee: Xiang Zhiyong

8 April 2011 3	Yanbian Baekdu Tigers	3 - 0	Shenzhen Phoenix	Yanbian, Jilin
15:30 UTC+8	Cui Ren 22'; Lee Kwang-Jae 51'; Xu Bo 90'			Stadium: Yanji People's Stadium; Referee: Guo Hao

13 April 2011 4	Shenzhen Phoenix	3 - 2	Tianjin Songjiang	Dongguan, Guangdong
15:30 UTC+8	Živković 42'; Xu Bo 60'; Johnson Macaba 83'		Rodić 10', 30'	Stadium: Nancheng Stadium; Referee: Shi Zhenlu

17 April 2011 5	Beijing 361 Degrees	0 - 1	Shenzhen Phoenix	Beijing
15:00 UTC+8			Sui Donglu 22'	Stadium: Beijing Institute of Technology; Referee: Wu Liying

23 April 2011 6	Tianjin Runyulong	0 - 2	Shenzhen Phoenix	Tianjin
15:00 UTC+8			Johnson Macaba 40'; Huang Long 68'	Stadium: Minyuan Stadium; Referee: Bao Lei
