= Rostyn Griffiths =

Australian soccer player

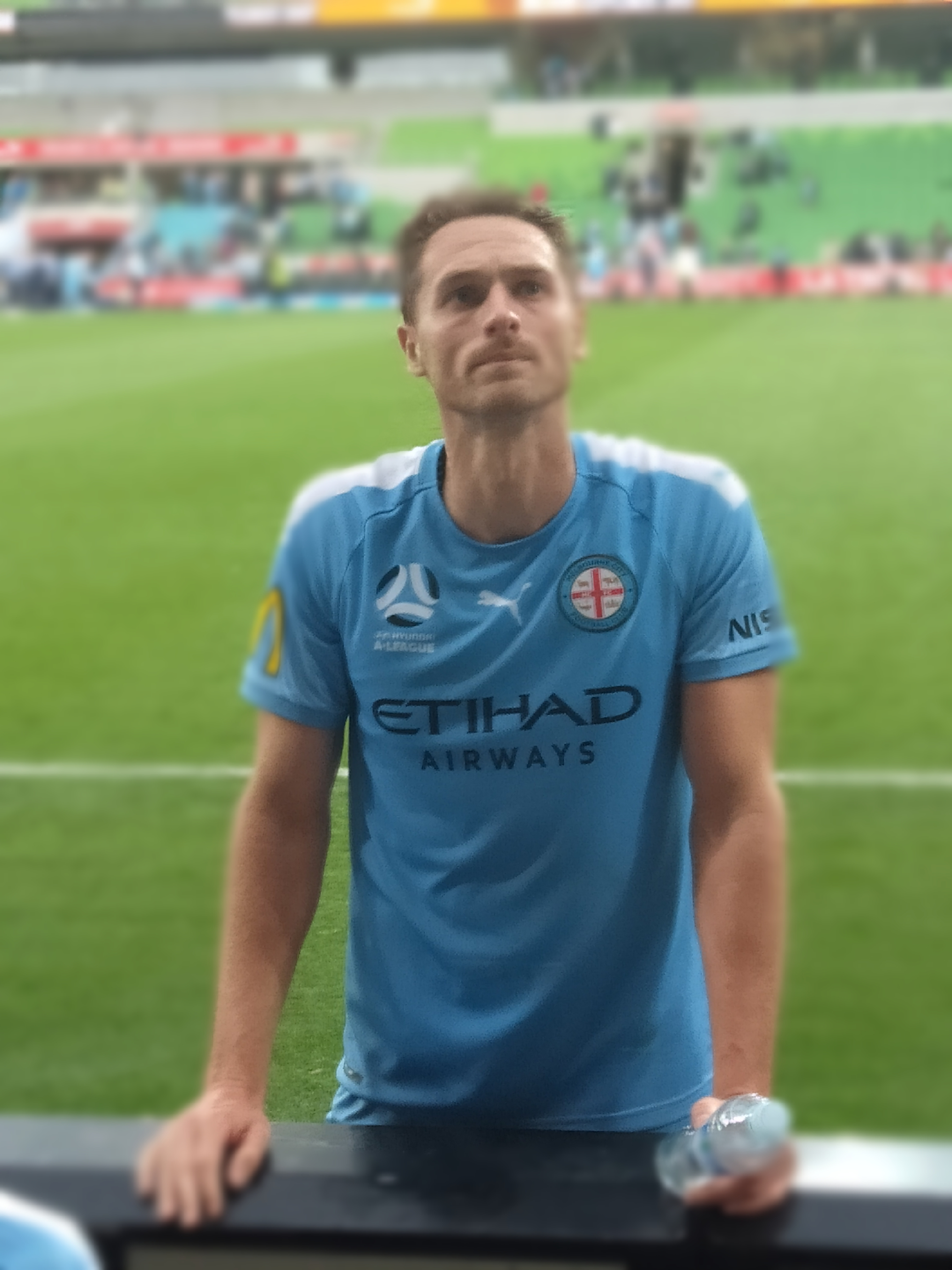
- Rostyn Griffiths with Melbourne City in 2019

Personal information
- Full name: Rostyn John Griffiths
- Date of birth: 10 March 1988 (age 38)
- Place of birth: Stoke-on-Trent, England
- Height: 1.88 m (6 ft 2 in)
- Positions: Centre-back; defensive midfielder

Youth career
- ECU Joondalup
- 2003–2006: Blackburn Rovers

Senior career*
Years	Team	Apps	(Gls)
2006–2009	Blackburn Rovers	0	(0)
2008	→ Gretna (loan)	12	(0)
2008	→ Accrington Stanley (loan)	13	(1)
2009	Adelaide United	2	(0)
2009–2010	North Queensland Fury	23	(3)
2010–2012	Central Coast Mariners	48	(4)
2012–2014	Guangzhou R&F	35	(1)
2014–2015	Perth Glory	35	(5)
2015–2016	Roda JC	18	(2)
2016–2017	Perth Glory	24	(3)
2017–2018	Pakhtakor Tashkent	16	(0)
2018–2022	Melbourne City	82	(4)
2022–2024	Mumbai City	26	(2)
2024–	Balcatta Etna	17	(2)

International career^{‡}
2005	Australia U17	2	(2)
- * Club domestic league appearances and goals as of 08:19, 3 December 2024 (UTC) ‡ National team caps and goals as of 7 April 2016

Rostyn John Griffiths (born 10 March 1988) is a professional soccer player who plays as a defender or defensive midfielder for NPL Western Australia club Balcatta Etna. Born in England, he represented Australia at youth level.

Griffiths joined Mumbai City from fellow City Football Group side and A-League outfit Melbourne City FC. The experienced Griffiths won the A-League Premiers Plate and Championship double in the 2020/21 season and also featured in the club's debut continental campaign at the 2022 AFC Champions League, before getting his hands on a second consecutive Premiers Plate in the 2021/22 season.

Griffiths is a former captain of A-League club Perth Glory. In August 2017 it was announced that Griffiths had signed a lucrative deal as a defensive midfielder for Uzbekistan giants Pakhtakor Tashkent in the Uzbek League.

Griffiths ranks amongst the highest-priced signings in A-League history, operating as a defensive midfielder. His career in the league includes a consistent role as a prominent player. He is recognized for disrupting the opposition's attacking phases and serving as a primary link in his team's possession buildup.

Griffiths starred for Central Coast Mariners from 2010 until he moved to Chinese club Guangzhou R&F in 2012. That departure attracted a $1.3 million transfer fee which remains an A-League record.

== Club career ==
Born in Stoke-on-Trent, England, Griffiths started his youth career with Australian club ECU Joondalup before moving to England to play for Blackburn Rovers where he never made a senior appearance but during the time he spent at Blackburn he joined Gretna on loan in January 2008. where he made his debut for the side against Heart of Midlothian in February.

=== Accrington Stanley ===
He signed a one-year deal with Blackburn in January 2008 and was sent on loan to Accrington Stanley for the remainder of his contract.

=== Adelaide United ===
On 3 February 2009, he was signed as an injury replacement player by A-League club Adelaide United. With the initial agreement only covering a four-week stint, there is an option to extend that to a two-year contract. However, it is a permanent deal, and not a loan.

=== North Queensland Fury ===
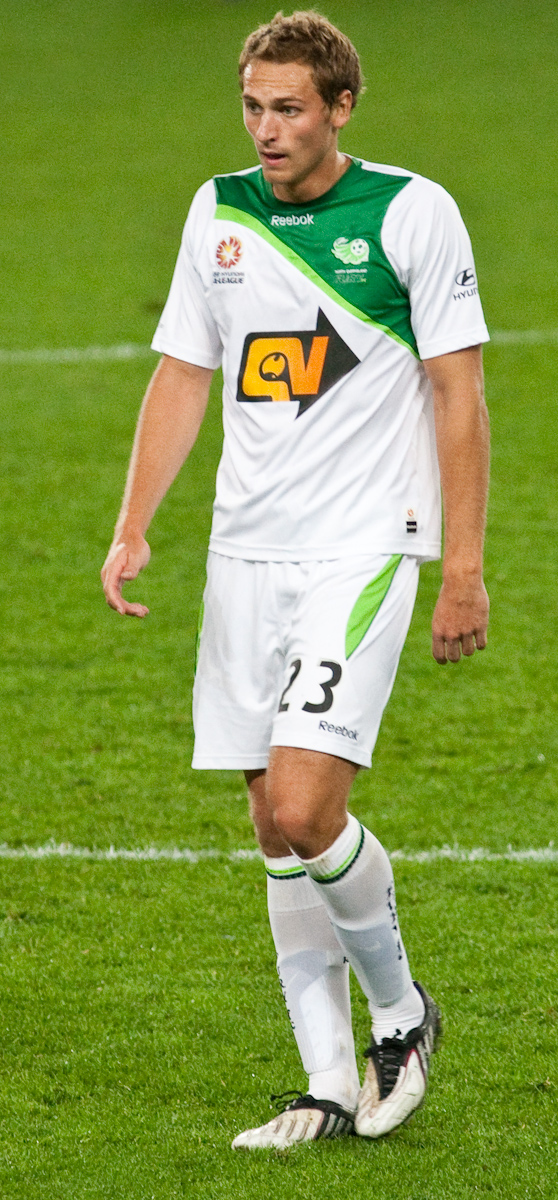
Griffiths playing for North Queensland Fury in 2009.

On 2 July 2009, it was announced that Griffiths would join A-League club North Queensland Fury for their inaugural season. On 8 August 2009, he started in Fury's first A-League match and scored Fury's first-ever goal in a competitive match against Sydney FC.

=== Guangzhou R&F ===
On 29 February 2012 it was announced that he had signed for Chinese Super League club Guangzhou for a fee that was undisclosed at the time, but later revealed to be $1.3 million, a record sum for an Australian transfer.

=== Perth Glory (2014–2015) ===
On 23 January 2014 it was announced that Griffiths returned to the A-League, signing with Perth Glory.

On 4 December 2014, Griffiths scored his first goal of the 2014–15 season against Sydney FC in the 84th minute before Andy Keogh scored in the 86th minute to earn a late 2–1 comeback.

=== Roda JC ===
On 26 July 2015, Perth Glory released Griffiths to allow him to sign a two-year deal with newly promoted Eredivisie club Roda JC. Following struggles for game-time, Griffiths left Roda JC after one season on 19 April 2016.

=== Perth Glory (2016–2017) ===
On 24 July 2016, Griffiths returned once more to the A-League, signing a two-year deal with Perth Glory after trialling with them on their Philippines Tour. On 2 October 2016, he was announced as captain of the club.

=== Pakhtakor Tashkent ===
On 1 August 2017, Perth Glory announced that Griffiths would be leaving the club with immediate effect to join Uzbek League side Pakhtakor Tashkent. Griffiths left Pakhtakor in May 2018, citing family reasons.

=== Melbourne City ===
On 19 July 2018, Griffiths signed a two-year deal with Melbourne City, joining the club well before the start of the 2018–19 season.

=== Mumbai City ===
In July 2022, Mumbai City announced the signing of Griffiths from sister club Melbourne City, on a one-yeal deal. On 18 August, he made his debut for the club against Indian Navy in the Durand Cup, which ended in a 4–1 win. Rostyn made his ISL debut versus Hyderabad FC, playing the entire game in a 3–3 draw. He scored his first goal for the club against ATK Mohun Bagan(now Mohun Bagan SG), following a goalmouth scuffle. His initial shot had hit the crossbar and bounced up, but Rostyn waited on the goal line and outjumped Vishal Kaith to head the ball into the net. His goal put Mumbai 2–1 up, but a late Carl McHugh equalizer ensured the game ended 2–2. He remained a key part of the team throughout the season, displacing club captain Mourtada Fall as the regular starting center-back, alongside Mehtab Singh, as the club went on a record-breaking 18-match unbeaten run, and won the ISL League Shield.

=== Balcatta Etna ===
On 1 March 2024, Griffiths signed for NPL Western Australia club Balcatta Etna.

== International career ==
Griffiths has played for Australia's National under 17 team, and scored a brace on his debut against Tonga. While he was still playing for Blackburn, he was courted by Wales' national teams, due to a Wales link on his Grandfather's side but, at that point, had not yet decided on his international allegiance.

== Personal life ==
His younger brother, Brent Griffiths is a retired professional footballer who last played for Penang in the Malaysia Super League. The brothers were together, during their stints in the youth set up of English Premier League side, Blackburn Rovers.

== Career statistics ==
=== Club ===
As of 25 January 2024

Club	Season	League			Cup		Continental		Total	
Club	Season	Division	Apps	Goals	Apps	Goals	Apps	Goals	Apps	Goals
Blackburn Rovers	2007–08	Premier League	0	0	0	0	—		0	0
Gretna (loan)	2007–08	Scottish Premier League	12	0	0	0	—		12	0
Accrington Stanley (loan)	2008–09	Football League Two	13	1	2 (Note: Appearance(s) in FA Cup)	0	—		15	1
Adelaide United	2008–09	A-League	2	0	0	0	—		2	0
North Queensland Fury	2009–10	A-League	23	2	0	0	—		23	2
Central Coast Mariners	2010–11	A-League	30	2	0	0	—		30	2
Central Coast Mariners	2011–12	A-League	18	2	0	0	—		18	2
Central Coast Mariners	Mariners total		48	4	0	0	0	0	48	4
Guangzhou R&F	2012	Chinese Super League	17	1	1 (Note: Appearance(s) in Chinese FA Cup)	0	—		18	1
Guangzhou R&F	2013	Chinese Super League	18	0	0	0	—		18	0
Guangzhou R&F	Guangzhou R&F total		35	1	1	0	0	0	36	1
Perth Glory	2013–14	A-League	10	2	0	0	—		9	2
Perth Glory	2014–15	A-League	25	3	3 (Note: Appearance(s) in Australia Cup)	0	—		28	3
Perth Glory	Perth total		35	5	3	0	0	0	38	5
Roda JC	2015–16	Eredivisie	18	2	2 (Note: Appearance(s) in KNVB Cup)	0	—		20	2
Perth Glory	2016–17	A-League	24	3	1	0	—		25	3
Pakhtakor Tashkent	2017	Uzbekistan Super League	7	0	0	0	—		7	0
Pakhtakor Tashkent	2018	Uzbekistan Super League	9	0	0	0	—		9	0
Pakhtakor Tashkent	Pakhtakor total		16	0	0	0	0	0	16	0
Melbourne City	2018–19	A-League	23	1	3	0	—		26	1
Melbourne City	2019–20	A-League	21	2	1	0	—		22	2
Melbourne City	2020–21	A-League	21	1	0	0	—		21	1
Melbourne City	2021–22	A-League	17	0	3	0	5 (Note: Appearance(s) in AFC Champions League)	0	25	0
Melbourne City	Total		82	4	7	0	5	0	94	4
Mumbai City	2022–23	Indian Super League	17	1	6 (Note: Appearance(s) in Durand Cup)	0	1 (Note: Appearance(s) in play-offs for AFC Champions League)	0	24	1
Mumbai City	2023–24	Indian Super League	9	1	4 (Note: Appearance(s) in Super Cup)	1	5	0	18	2
Mumbai City	Total		26	2	10	1	6	0	42	3
Balcatta Etna	2024	NPL WA	15	2	2	0	—		17	2
Career total			349	26	26	1	11	0	388	27

== Honours ==
Central Coast Mariners

- A-League Premiership: 2011–12

Melbourne City

- A-League Premiership: 2020–21, 2021–22
- A-League Championship: 2020–21

Mumbai City

- Indian Super League Premiership: 2022–23

Australia U-17

- OFC U-17 Championship: 2005
