= Jin Yangyang =

Chinese football player

Jin Yangyang 金洋洋
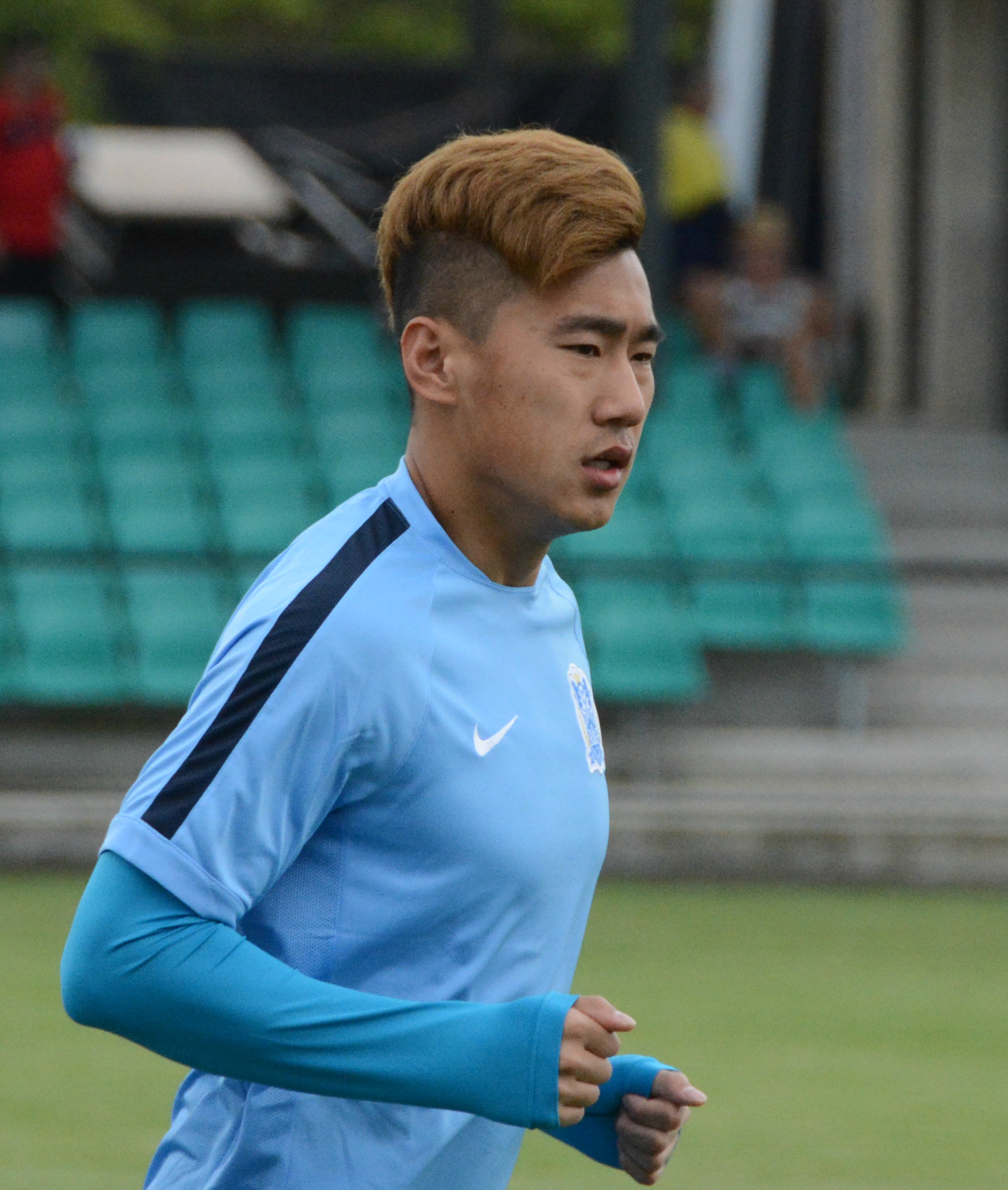

Personal information
- Date of birth: 3 February 1993 (age 33)
- Place of birth: Dalian, Liaoning, China
- Height: 1.89 m (6 ft 2 1/2 in)
- Position: Centre-back

Team information
- Current team: Qingdao Hainiu
- Number: 4

Senior career*
Years	Team	Apps	(Gls)
2011–2012	Dalian Shide	2	(0)
2013–2014	Dalian Aerbin	10	(0)
2015	Guangzhou R&F	18	(2)
2016–2020	Hebei China Fortune	59	(1)
2021–2024	Shanghai Shenhua	46	(2)
2021	→ Tianjin Jinmen Tiger (loan)	12	(1)
2024	→ Qingdao West Coast (loan)	11	(0)
2025–	Qingdao Hainiu	52	(0)

International career
	China U19	16	(1)
2015-2016	China U23	6	(0)
- * Club domestic league appearances and goals as of 22 November 2026

Jin Yangyang (Chinese: 金洋洋; pinyin: Jīn Yángyáng; Mandarin pronunciation: [tɕín.jǎŋ.jǎŋ]; born 3 February 1993 in Dalian) is a Chinese professional footballer who currently plays as a centre-back for Chinese Super League club Qingdao Hainiu.

== Club career ==
Jin started his professional football career in 2011 when he was promoted to Chinese Super League side Dalian Shide. On 9 July 2012, he made his senior debut for Dalian Shide in a 1–0 away victory against Changchun Yatai, coming on as a substitute for Zhang Yaokun in the 80th minute. He made 2 league appearances in the 2012 league season. In 2013, Jin transferred to Dalian Aerbin after Dalian Shide dissolved. On 13 August 2014, he made his debut for Dalian Aerbin in the 2014 Chinese Super League against Guangzhou Evergrande.

In January 2015, Jin transferred to fellow Chinese Super League side Guangzhou R&F. He made his debut for Guangzhou on 24 February 2015 in a 2015 AFC Champions League against Gamba Osaka with a 2–0 away win, coming on as a substitute for Míchel in the 88th minute. On 3 April 2015, he scored his first and second senior goal in a 4–0 home win against Guizhou Renhe. However, he received a ban of four matches for waving the finger during the match.

Jin moved to Super League newcomer Hebei China Fortune on 19 February 2016 with a transfer fee of ¥80 million. On 4 March 2016, he made his debut for Hebei in a 2–1 away league win against Guangzhou R&F. He would immediately establish himself as an integral member of the team and in the following campaign the club narrowly missed out in qualifying for the 2018 AFC Champions League. He would go on to score his first goal for the club in a league game on 28 April 2018 against Tianjin Quanjian in a 3–0 victory. Unfortunately this would be the highlight of his time at Hebei as the club would regress in the league rankings and Jin would also see less playing time while his contract would be up for renewal resulting in him even being moved to the reserve team.

On 12 April 2021, Jin joined Shanghai Shenhua on a free transfer. On 13 July 2021, Jin was loaned to Tianjin Jinmen Tiger before making an appearance for Shenhua. He made his debut for Jinmen Tiger on 19 July 2021 in a goalless draw against Beijing Guoan, which was also his 100th career game in all competitions. On his return to Shenhua he would make his debut in a league game on 5 August 2022 against Changchun Yatai in a 0–0 draw.

On 17 January 2025, Jin joined Qingdao Hainiu as free agent.

== International career ==
Jin was called up to the senior Chinese training camp for the 2018 FIFA World Cup qualification – AFC third round in July 2016.

== Career statistics ==
Statistics accurate as of match played 31 December 2023.

Appearances and goals by club, season and competition
Club	Season	League			National Cup		Continental		Other		Total	
Club	Season	Division	Apps	Goals	Apps	Goals	Apps	Goals	Apps	Goals	Apps	Goals
Dalian Shide	2011	Chinese Super League	0	0	0	0	-		-		0	0
Dalian Shide	2012	Chinese Super League	2	0	1	0	-		-		3	0
Dalian Shide	Total		2	0	1	0	0	0	0	0	3	0
Dalian Aerbin	2013	Chinese Super League	0	0	0	0	-		-		0	0
Dalian Aerbin	2014	Chinese Super League	10	0	0	0	-		-		10	0
Dalian Aerbin	Total		10	0	0	0	0	0	0	0	10	0
Guangzhou R&F	2015	Chinese Super League	18	2	1	0	4	0	-		23	2
Hebei China Fortune	2016	Chinese Super League	25	0	0	0	-		-		25	0
Hebei China Fortune	2017	Chinese Super League	12	0	1	0	-		-		13	0
Hebei China Fortune	2018	Chinese Super League	16	1	2	0	-		-		18	1
Hebei China Fortune	2019	Chinese Super League	6	0	1	0	-		-		7	0
Hebei China Fortune	Total		59	1	4	0	0	0	0	0	63	1
Shanghai Shenhua	2021	Chinese Super League	0	0	0	0	-		-		0	0
Shanghai Shenhua	2022	Chinese Super League	24	1	0	0	-		-		24	1
Shanghai Shenhua	2023	Chinese Super League	22	1	2	0	-		-		24	1
Shanghai Shenhua	2024	Chinese Super League	0	0	-		-		0	0	0	0
Shanghai Shenhua	Total		46	2	2	0	0	0	0	0	48	2
Tianjin Jinmen Tiger (loan)	2021	Chinese Super League	12	1	2	0	-		-		14	1
Career total			147	6	10	0	4	0	0	0	161	6

== Honours ==
Shanghai Shenhua

- Chinese FA Cup: 2023
- Chinese FA Super Cup: 2024
