= Wang Qiang (footballer) =

Chinese footballer

Wang Qiang 汪强
Personal information
- Full name: Wang Qiang
- Date of birth: 23 July 1984 (age 42)
- Place of birth: Dalian, Liaoning, China
- Height: 1.85 m (6 ft 1 in)
- Position: Defender

Youth career
- 2002–2003: Changsha Ginde

Senior career*
Years	Team	Apps	(Gls)
2003–2010	Changsha Ginde	151	(7)
2011–2015	Shandong Luneng	61	(3)
2016–2018	Beijing Renhe	45	(2)

International career^{‡}
2009–2011	China	14	(0)

Managerial career
- 2022: Shandong Taishan U13
- 2024–: Shandong Taishan U15
Medal record
Representing China
Men's football
EAFF Championship
Gold medal – first place	2010 Japan	Team
- * Club domestic league appearances and goals as of 11 November 2018 ‡ National team caps and goals as of 16 October 2012

Wang Qiang (simplified Chinese: 汪强; traditional Chinese: 汪強; pinyin: Wāng Qiáng, born 23 July 1984) is a Chinese former international footballer as a defender. Wang's twin elder brother Wang Gang is a retired footballer.

== Club career ==
Wang Qiang started his professional football career in the 2003 league season for top-tier side Shenyang Ginde as a versatile defender and by the 2005 league campaign he established himself as a regular when he played in 21 league games for them. While Shenyang Ginde were often fighting against relegation throughout much of the 2006 Chinese Super League season Wang Qiang was able to cement his position within the team and scored his first league goal against Inter Xian on 22 July 2006 in a 2–1 win during the season. At the beginning of the 2007 league season Shenyang Ginde moved to Changsha and renamed themselves Changsha Ginde, Wang Qiang continued to be a regular fixture within the team and even help them improve from their previous league standing when he helped them finish the league in a respectable 10th. Being a permanent fixture within the team's central defence Wang was promoted as the club's captain the following season, however his time as captain was not the most productive in the club's history and each season saw the club slip down the table until they were relegated at the end of 2010 Chinese Super League season. Before the start of the 2011 league campaign reigning league title holders Shandong Luneng bought Wang for 5 million yuan.

In December 2015, Wang transferred to China League One side Beijing Renhe with a two-year contract on a free transfer. He extended his contract with the club on 31 December 2017 after Beijing Renhe promoted to the Chinese Super League.

== International career ==
Wang Qiang made his international debut against Palestine on 18 July 2009 in a friendly, which China won 3–1. After that game he became a regular fixture within the national team and was included in the squad that won the 2010 East Asian Football Championship before being called up to the team that took part in the 2011 AFC Asian Cup.

== Career statistics ==
Statistics accurate as of match played 11 November 2018.

Club performance			League		Cup		League Cup		Continental		Other		Total	
Season	Club	League	Apps	Goals	Apps	Goals	Apps	Goals	Apps	Goals	Apps	Goals	Apps	Goals
China PR			League		FA Cup		CSL Cup		Asia		FA Super Cup		Total	
2003	Shenyang Ginde / Changsha Ginde	Jia-A League / CSL	1	0		0	-		-		-		1	0
2004	Shenyang Ginde / Changsha Ginde	Jia-A League / CSL	12	0		0		0	-		-		12	0
2005	Shenyang Ginde / Changsha Ginde	Jia-A League / CSL	21	0		0	2	1	-		-		23	1
2006	Shenyang Ginde / Changsha Ginde	Jia-A League / CSL	22	2		0	-		-		-		22	2
2007	Shenyang Ginde / Changsha Ginde	Jia-A League / CSL	19	0	-		-		-		-		19	0
2008	Shenyang Ginde / Changsha Ginde	Jia-A League / CSL	24	2	-		-		-		-		24	2
2009	Shenyang Ginde / Changsha Ginde	Jia-A League / CSL	28	3	-		-		-		-		28	3
2010	Shenyang Ginde / Changsha Ginde	Jia-A League / CSL	29	0	-		-		-		-		29	0
2011	Shandong Luneng	Jia-A League / CSL	17	0	0	0	-		2	0	-		19	0
2012	Shandong Luneng	Jia-A League / CSL	21	1	3	1	-		-		-		24	2
2013	Shandong Luneng	Jia-A League / CSL	3	0	2	0	-		-		-		5	0
2014	Shandong Luneng	Jia-A League / CSL	8	0	3	0	-		1	0	-		12	0
2015	Shandong Luneng	Jia-A League / CSL	12	2	3	0	-		3	0	1	0	19	2
2016	Guizhou Renhe / Beijing Renhe	China League One	21	3	0	0	-		-		-		21	3
2017	Guizhou Renhe / Beijing Renhe	China League One	23	0	0	0	-		-		-		23	0
2018	Guizhou Renhe / Beijing Renhe	CSL	1	0	0	0	-		-		-		1	0
Total	China PR		262	13	11	1	2	1	6	0	1	0	282	15

== Honours ==
=== Club ===
Shandong Luneng Taishan

- Chinese FA Cup: 2014
- Chinese FA Super Cup: 2015

=== International ===
China PR national football team

- East Asian Football Championship: 2010

Sporting positions
Preceded by Zhang Lie	Shenyang Ginde captain 2005–2006	Succeeded by Li Zhenhong
Preceded by Li Zhenhong	Changsha Ginde captain 2007–2010	Succeeded by Li Zhe
