= Liu Cheng (footballer, born 1983) =

Chinese footballer

Liu Cheng 刘成
Personal information
- Full name: Liu Cheng
- Date of birth: 23 October 1983 (age 43)
- Place of birth: Changsha, Hunan, China
- Height: 1.84 m (6 ft 0 in)
- Position: Defender

Youth career
- 1995–1998: Shanghai Oriental Pearl Youth
- 1998–1999: Sichuan Quanxing

Senior career*
| Years | Team | Apps | (Gls) |
| 2000–2004 | Sichuan Quanxing | 48 | (0) |
| 2005 | Hunan Billows | ? | (?) |
| 2006 | Dalian Shide | 8 | (0) |
| 2007–2009 | Chengdu Blades | 46 | (3) |
| 2010–2014 | Guangzhou R&F | 52 | (0) |

International career^{‡}
| 2001 | China U-20 | | |

Managerial career
- 2022: China U19 (trainer)
- 2023: Shijiazhuang Gongfu (assistant)
- 2024: Shijiazhuang Gongfu (caretaker)
- * Club domestic league appearances and goals as of 4 November 2013 ‡ National team caps and goals as of 4 November 2013

Liu Cheng (simplified Chinese: 刘成; traditional Chinese: 劉成; pinyin: Liú Chéng, born 23 October 1983 in Changsha, Hunan) is a retired Chinese footballer.

== Club career ==
Liu Cheng began his professional football career with Sichuan Quanxing in 2000 as a highly regarded seventeen-year-old youth player who made ten league appearances in his debut season. He would eventually go on to gradually establish himself as a regular within the team until the 2005 league season saw second tier side Hunan Billows willing to pay 3.8 million RMB for him. Liu Cheng left after only one season to go on to join reigning league champions Dalian Shide F.C. where he struggled to hold down a regular place within the team. In the 2007 league season he would go on to join second tier side Chengdu Blades and quickly see them win promotion when they came second within the league. With Chengdu he would go on to establish himself as their first choice right-back and see the team become mid-table regulars until the team were relegated at the end of the 2009 league season after it was discovered that the club had fixed a game in their 2007 promotion.

While none of the players were implicated with match fixing, Liu Cheng decided to leave the club and at the beginning of the 2010 league season he joined top tier club Changsha Ginde, which brought him back to his hometown of Changsha on a swap deal with Song Zhenyu and the club quickly made him their first choice right-back. His initial time at the club was not a success and in his debut season he saw the club relegated at the end of the season. Liu Cheng stayed with the club as they eventually moved to Guangzhou and rename themselves Guangzhou R&F, which seemed to revive the club's fortunes and saw them win promotion at the end of the 2011 China League One season.

Liu retired from football in January 2016.

== International career ==
In 2000 Liu Cheng was the surprise choice of Chinese Head coach Bora Milutinović's first squad despite the player having little to no first team experience. Liu did not go on to make his debut and after injury as well as a lack of form the following seasons saw his international career all but end until 2010 when Chinese Head coach Gao Hongbo recalled into the squad.
