= Sui Donglu =

Chinese footballer

Sui Donglu 隋东陆
Personal information
- Full name: Sui Donglu
- Date of birth: June 21, 1983 (age 43)
- Place of birth: Dalian, Liaoning, China
- Height: 1.94 m (6 ft 4 1/2 in)
- Position: Defender

Senior career*
Years	Team	Apps	(Gls)
2003	Yunnan Hongta	11	(0)
2004	Chongqing Lifan	0	(0)
2005	Jiangsu Sainty	22	(2)
2006–2009	Shenzhen Kingway	23	(0)
2010	Chengdu Blades	14	(1)
2011–2012	Guangzhou R&F	32	(3)
2013–2018	Chongqing Lifan	100	(6)
2019	Henan Jianye	20	(0)
2021	Hebei Kungfu	13	(1)
2023	Zibo Qisheng	3	(0)
- * Club domestic league appearances and goals as of 17 May 2022

Sui Donglu (Simplified Chinese: 隋东陆) (born June 21, 1982 in Dalian) is a Chinese former professional footballer as a defender.

== Club career ==
=== Early career ===
Sui Donglu began his football career playing for Yunnan Hongta in the 2003 league season where in his debut season he would go on to make 11 league appearances. His development was stunted the following season when Yunnan merged with Chongqing Lifan and the increase in squad size saw him often dropped from the senior team into the reserves. Sui was allowed to leave for second tier side Jiangsu Sainty the next season to kick-start his career. While at his new club he gained considerably more playing time and attracted the interests of top tier side Shenzhen Kingway.

=== Shenzhen Kingway ===
Joining Shenzhen Kingway at the beginning of the 2006 league season he would be allowed to gradually establish himself within the team's defence, with the Shenzhen manager Wang Baoshan showing considerable faith in him, however this would not last and Wang left before the end of the season. This saw Sui dropped from the first team the following season and would have to prove himself in the reserves before he was given his chance to become a regular within the team during the 2008 league season. Despite several managers coming in during the 2008 campaign all kept faith with Sui however at the beginning of the 2009 league season Shenzhen appointed Fan Yuhong who dropped him into the reserves once again before transfer listing him.

=== Chengdu Blades ===
Allowed to leave Sui Donglu would join his former boss Wang Baoshan with Chengdu Blades and play in the second tier. He would initially struggle to gain a place within the team and spent much of his time on the bench until he made his debut on May 2, 2010 in a league game against Shenyang Dongjin where he came on as a late substitute for Johnson Macaba in a 0-0 draw. Gaining more playing as the season went on he would go on to be a vital member of the team and would go on to play in twelve league games, scoring one goal while he helped Chengdu come runners-up within the league and promotion back to the top tier.

== Club career statistics ==
Statistics accurate as of match played 31 December 2019.

Appearances and goals by club, season and competition
Club	Season	League			National Cup		League Cup		Continental		Total	
Club	Season	Division	Apps	Goals	Apps	Goals	Apps	Goals	Apps	Goals	Apps	Goals
Yunnan Hongta	2003	Chinese Jia-A League	11	0			-		-		11	0
Chongqing Lifan	2004	Chinese Super League	0	0					-		0	0
Jiangsu Sainty	2005	China League One	22	2			-		-		22	2
Shenzhen Ruby	2006	Chinese Super League	12	0			-		-		12	0
Shenzhen Ruby	2007	Chinese Super League	0	0	-		-		-		0	0
Shenzhen Ruby	2008	Chinese Super League	11	0	-		-		-		11	0
Shenzhen Ruby	2009	Chinese Super League	0	0	-		-		-		0	0
Shenzhen Ruby	Total		23	0	0	0	0	0	0	0	23	0
Chengdu Blades	2010	China League One	14	1	-		-		-		14	1
Guangzhou R&F	2011	China League One	25	2	0	0	-		-		25	2
Guangzhou R&F	2012	Chinese Super League	7	1	0	0	-		-		7	1
Guangzhou R&F	Total		32	3	0	0	0	0	0	0	32	3
Chongqing Lifan	2013	China League One	24	2	0	0	-		-		24	2
Chongqing Lifan	2014	China League One	29	4	1	0	-		-		30	4
Chongqing Lifan	2015	Chinese Super League	7	0	1	0	-		-		8	0
Chongqing Lifan	2016	Chinese Super League	15	0	1	0	-		-		16	0
Chongqing Lifan	2017	Chinese Super League	21	0	1	0	-		-		22	0
Chongqing Lifan	2018	Chinese Super League	4	0	2	1	-		-		6	1
Chongqing Lifan	Total		100	6	6	1	0	0	0	0	106	7
Henan Jianye	2019	Chinese Super League	20	0	0	0	-		-		20	0
Total	China PR		222	12	6	1	0	0	0	0	228	13

== Honours ==
=== Club ===
Chongqing Lifan

- China League One: 2014
