= Zhang Shichang =

Chinese footballer

Zhang Shichang 张世昌
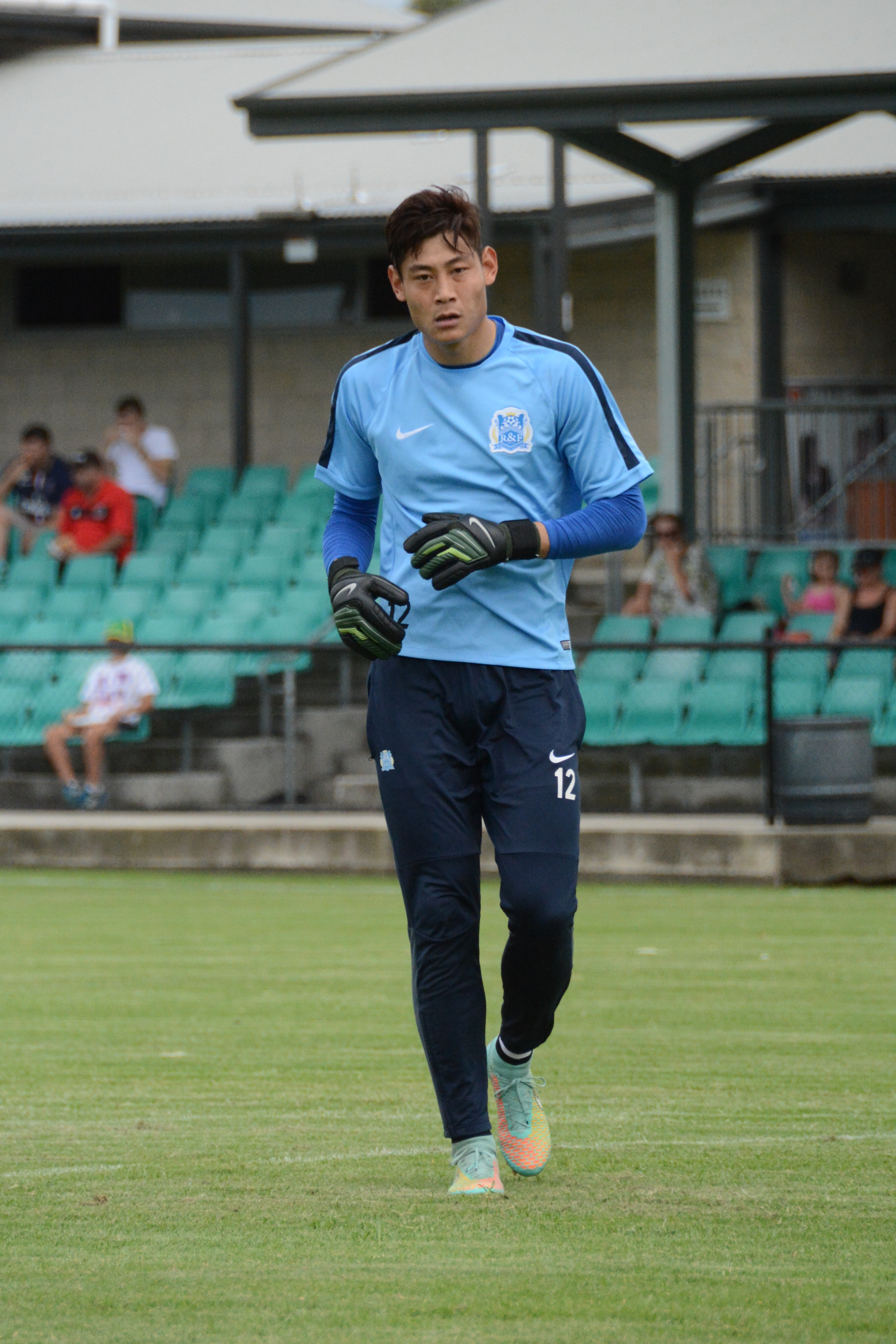

Personal information
- Date of birth: 5 January 1989 (age 37)
- Place of birth: Tianjin, China
- Height: 1.92 m (6 ft 3 1/2 in)
- Position: Goalkeeper

Youth career
- –2007: Tianjin Locomotive
- 2007–2008: Belenenses
- 2008: Henan Construction

Senior career*
Years	Team	Apps	(Gls)
2009–2011	Henan Construction	10	(0)
2012–2013	Shenzhen Ruby	39	(0)
2014–2016	Guangzhou R&F	7	(0)
2017–2020	Sichuan Longfor	24	(0)

International career
2005	China U17		
2006	China U20		
2009–2010	China U23		
- * Club domestic league appearances and goals as of 4 November 2018

Zhang Shichang (simplified Chinese: 张世昌; traditional Chinese: 張世昌; pinyin: Zhāng Shìchāng; born 5 January 1989) is a former Chinese professional football player.

== Club career ==
Zhang began his football career at Tianjin Locomotive and transferred to Portuguese Liga side Belenenses in 2007. But he did not establish himself in the Belenenses youth squad and returned to China in the summer of 2008. Then he was signed by Henan Construction. Zhang started his professional career in 2009. On 31 October 2009, he made his senior debut for Henan as a substitution, with the regular goalkeeper Zeng Cheng sent off in 47th minute. In February 2014, Zhang transferred to Chinese Super League side Guangzhou R&F.

On 7 February 2017, Zhang moved to League Two side Sichuan Longfor.
