= Chang Feiya =

Chinese football player

Chang Feiya 常飞亚
Personal information
- Date of birth: 3 February 1993 (age 33)
- Place of birth: Fuyang, Anhui, China
- Height: 1.83 m (6 ft 0 in)
- Position: Winger

Team information
- Current team: Foshan Nanshi
- Number: 9

Youth career
- 2003–2008: Gao Fengwen Football School
- 2008–2012: Guangdong Youth
- 2013: Guangzhou R&F

Senior career*
Years	Team	Apps	(Gls)
2011–2012	Guangdong Youth	38	(7)
2014–2022	Guangzhou City	104	(4)
2017	→ Guizhou Zhicheng (loan)	21	(1)
2019	→ Wuhan Zall (loan)	13	(1)
2023	Tianjin Jinmen Tiger	10	(0)
2024	Shanghai Jiading Huilong	12	(0)
2024–	Foshan Nanshi	29	(1)

International career
2014–2016	China U-23		
- * Club domestic league appearances and goals as of 8 November 2025

Chang Feiya (Chinese: 常飞亚; pinyin: Cháng Fēiyà; Mandarin pronunciation: [ʈʂʰǎŋ féɪ jâ]; born 3 February 1993 in Linquan) is a Chinese football player who currently plays for Chinese League One side Foshan Nanshi.

== Club career ==
Chang started his professional football career in 2011 when he was promoted to Guangdong Youth's squad for the 2011 China League Two campaign. He joined Chinese Super League side Guangzhou R&F (now known as Guangzhou City) in 2013. With high praise of team manager Sven-Göran Eriksson, he was promoted to the first team in December 2013. On 16 March 2014, he made his Super League debut in a goalless draw against Liaoning Whowin, coming on as a substitute for Abderrazak Hamdallah in the 81st minute. He scored his first Super League goal on 26 April 2015, which ensured Guangzhou R&F beat Changchun Yatai 2–1.

In February 2017, Chang extended his contract with the club until the end of 2019 and was loaned to Super League newcomer Guizhou Zhicheng for one season. He made his debut for Guizhou on 3 March 2017 in a 1–1 home draw against Liaoning FC, coming on as a substitute for Ilhamjan Iminjan in the 66th minute. On 26 February 2019, Chang was loaned out again to Super League newcomer Wuhan Zall for the 2019 season. On 4 April 2023 he transferred to fellow top tier club Tianjin Jinmen Tiger.

== Career statistics ==
Statistics accurate as of match played 8 November 2025.

Appearances and goals by club, season and competition
Club	Season	League			National Cup		League Cup		Continental		Total	
Club	Season	Division	Apps	Goals	Apps	Goals	Apps	Goals	Apps	Goals	Apps	Goals
Guangdong Youth	2011	China League Two	19	3	-		-		-		19	3
Guangdong Youth	2012	China League Two	19	4	2	1	-		-		21	5
Guangdong Youth	Total		38	7	2	1	0	0	0	0	40	8
Guangzhou R&F/ Guangzhou City	2014	Chinese Super League	21	0	1	0	-		-		22	0
Guangzhou R&F/ Guangzhou City	2015	Chinese Super League	22	1	2	0	-		7	0	31	1
Guangzhou R&F/ Guangzhou City	2016	Chinese Super League	14	0	1	0	-		-		15	0
Guangzhou R&F/ Guangzhou City	2018	Chinese Super League	12	1	4	0	-		-		16	1
Guangzhou R&F/ Guangzhou City	2020	Chinese Super League	17	1	3	0	-		-		20	1
Guangzhou R&F/ Guangzhou City	2021	Chinese Super League	5	0	0	0	-		-		5	0
Guangzhou R&F/ Guangzhou City	2022	Chinese Super League	13	1	0	0	-		-		13	1
Guangzhou R&F/ Guangzhou City	Total		104	4	11	0	0	0	7	0	122	4
Guizhou Zhicheng (loan)	2017	Chinese Super League	21	1	0	0	-		-		21	1
Wuhan Zall (loan)	2019	Chinese Super League	13	1	1	0	-		-		14	1
Tianjin Jinmen Tiger	2023	Chinese Super League	10	0	1	0	-		-		11	0
Shanghai Jiading Huilong	2024	China League One	12	0	1	0	-		-		13	0
Foshan Nanshi	2024	China League One	11	0	-		-		-		11	0
Foshan Nanshi	2025	China League One	18	1	0	0	-		-		18	1
Foshan Nanshi	Total		29	1	0	0	0	0	0	0	29	1
Career total			227	14	16	1	0	0	7	0	250	15
