= Feng Zhuoyi =

Chinese footballer

Feng Zhuoyi 冯卓毅
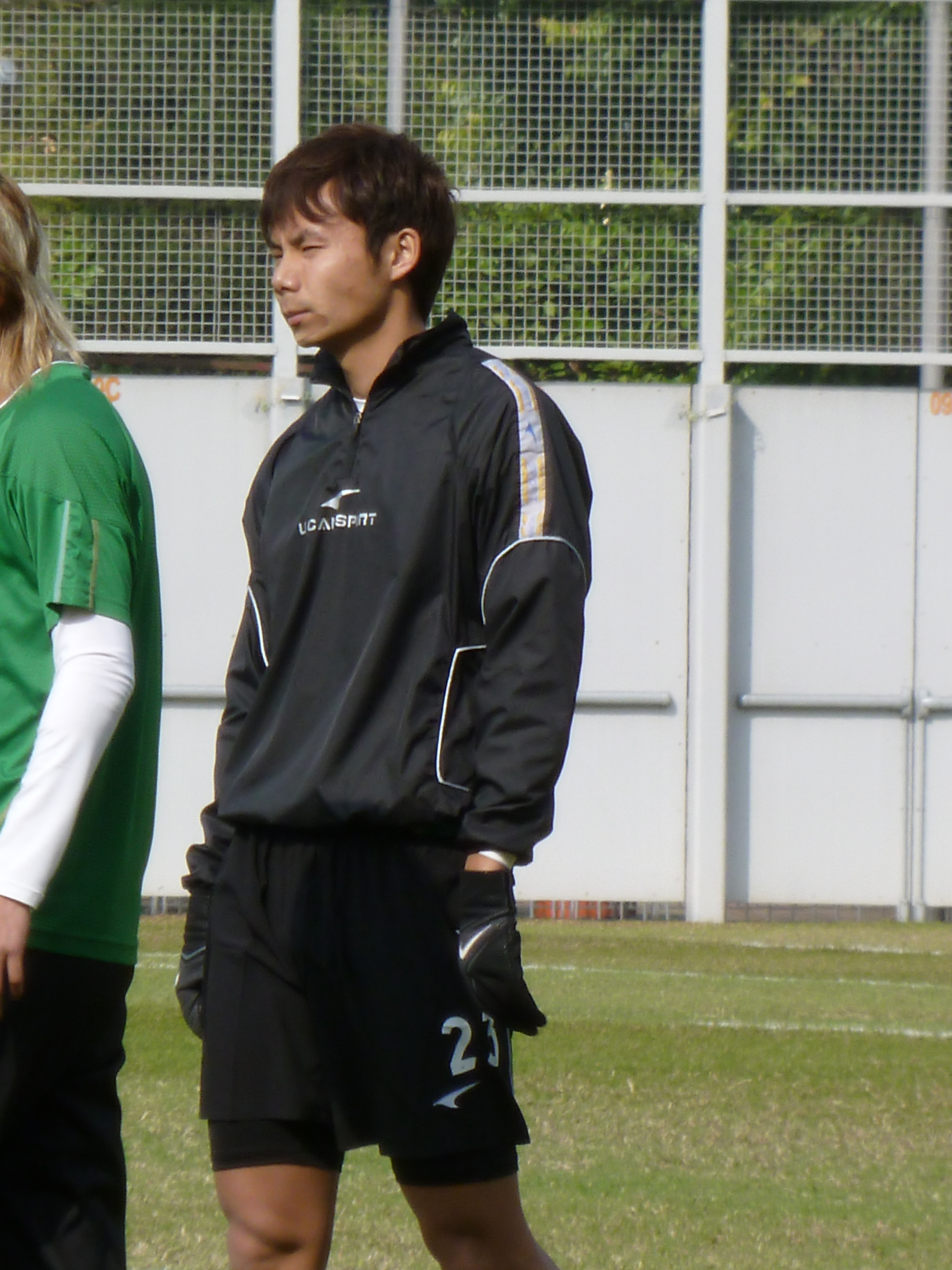

Personal information
- Full name: Feng Zhuoyi
- Date of birth: 18 June 1989 (age 37)
- Place of birth: Wuhan, Hubei, China
- Height: 1.83 m (6 ft 0 in)
- Position: Midfielder

Team information
- Current team: Chengdu Rongcheng
- Number: 6

Youth career
- 2002–2008: Chengdu Blades

Senior career*
Years	Team	Apps	(Gls)
2009–2012	Chengdu Blades	62	(7)
2013–2015	Guangzhou R&F	10	(0)
2016–2019	Henan Jianye	103	(6)
2020–	Chengdu Rongcheng	81	(9)
2025	→ Shijiazhuang Gongfu (loan)	12	(0)
- * Club domestic league appearances and goals as of 9 March 2026

Feng Zhuoyi (Chinese: 冯卓毅; born June 18, 1989) is a Chinese football player for Chengdu Rongcheng where he plays as a defensive midfielder.

== Club career ==
Feng started his senior career with Chengdu Blades in 2009. He scored his first senior goal on 7 April 2012, in a 2–2 away draw against Fujian Smart Hero. Feng transferred to Chinese Super League side Guangzhou R&F on 31 January 2013. He made his debut for Guangzhou on 21 May 2013 in a 2013 Chinese FA Cup match against Chongqing FC. He made his league debut four days later in a 3–2 home win against Dalian Aerbin.

On 26 February 2016, Feng transferred to fellow Chinese Super League side Henan Jianye. He made his debut for Henan on 5 March 2016 in a 1–0 home win against Shanghai SIPG. On 2 July 2016, Feng scored his first goal for Henan in the last minute of a league match against Beijing Guoan, which ensured Henan's 1–0 victory.

On 24 March 2020, Feng returned to Chengdu to join second tier football club Chengdu Better City. He made his debut for the club in a league game on 12 September 2020 against Beijing Chengfeng in a 3-2 victory, where he also scored his first goal for the club. After two seasons with the club he would establish himself as a regular within the team and aid them to promotion at the end of the 2021 league campaign.

On 17 July 2025, Feng was loan out to China League One club Shijiazhuang Gongfu.

== Career statistics ==
Statistics accurate as of match played 8 January 2026.

Appearances and goals by club, season and competition
Club	Season	League			National Cup		Continental		Other		Total	
Club	Season	Division	Apps	Goals	Apps	Goals	Apps	Goals	Apps	Goals	Apps	Goals
Chengdu Blades	2009	Chinese Super League	6	0	-		-		-		6	0
Chengdu Blades	2010	China League One	3	0	-		-		-		3	0
Chengdu Blades	2011	Chinese Super League	25	0	1	0	-		-		26	0
Chengdu Blades	2012	China League One	28	7	2	0	-		-		30	7
Chengdu Blades	Total		62	7	3	0	0	0	0	0	65	7
Guangzhou R&F	2013	Chinese Super League	5	0	2	0	-		-		7	0
Guangzhou R&F	2014	Chinese Super League	1	0	1	0	-		-		2	0
Guangzhou R&F	2015	Chinese Super League	4	0	1	0	2	0	-		7	0
Guangzhou R&F	Total		10	0	4	0	2	0	0	0	16	0
Henan Jianye	2016	Chinese Super League	27	1	2	0	-		-		29	1
Henan Jianye	2017	Chinese Super League	24	1	1	0	-		-		25	1
Henan Jianye	2018	Chinese Super League	26	1	0	0	-		-		26	1
Henan Jianye	2019	Chinese Super League	26	3	0	0	-		-		26	3
Henan Jianye	Total		103	6	3	0	0	0	0	0	106	6
Chengdu Rongcheng	2020	China League One	7	1	1	0	-		-		8	1
Chengdu Rongcheng	2021	China League One	33	4	0	0	-		2 (Note: Appearance(s) in CSL Relegation play-offs)	0	35	4
Chengdu Rongcheng	2022	Chinese Super League	7	3	0	0	-		-		7	3
Chengdu Rongcheng	2023	Chinese Super League	19	1	1	0	-		-		20	1
Chengdu Rongcheng	2024	Chinese Super League	13	0	1	0	-		-		14	0
Chengdu Rongcheng	Total		79	9	3	0	0	0	2	0	84	9
Shijiazhuang Gongfu (loan)	2025	China League One	12	0	0	0	-		-		12	0
Career total			266	22	13	0	2	0	2	0	283	22
