= Tang Miao (footballer, born October 1990) =

Chinese footballer

Tang Miao 唐淼
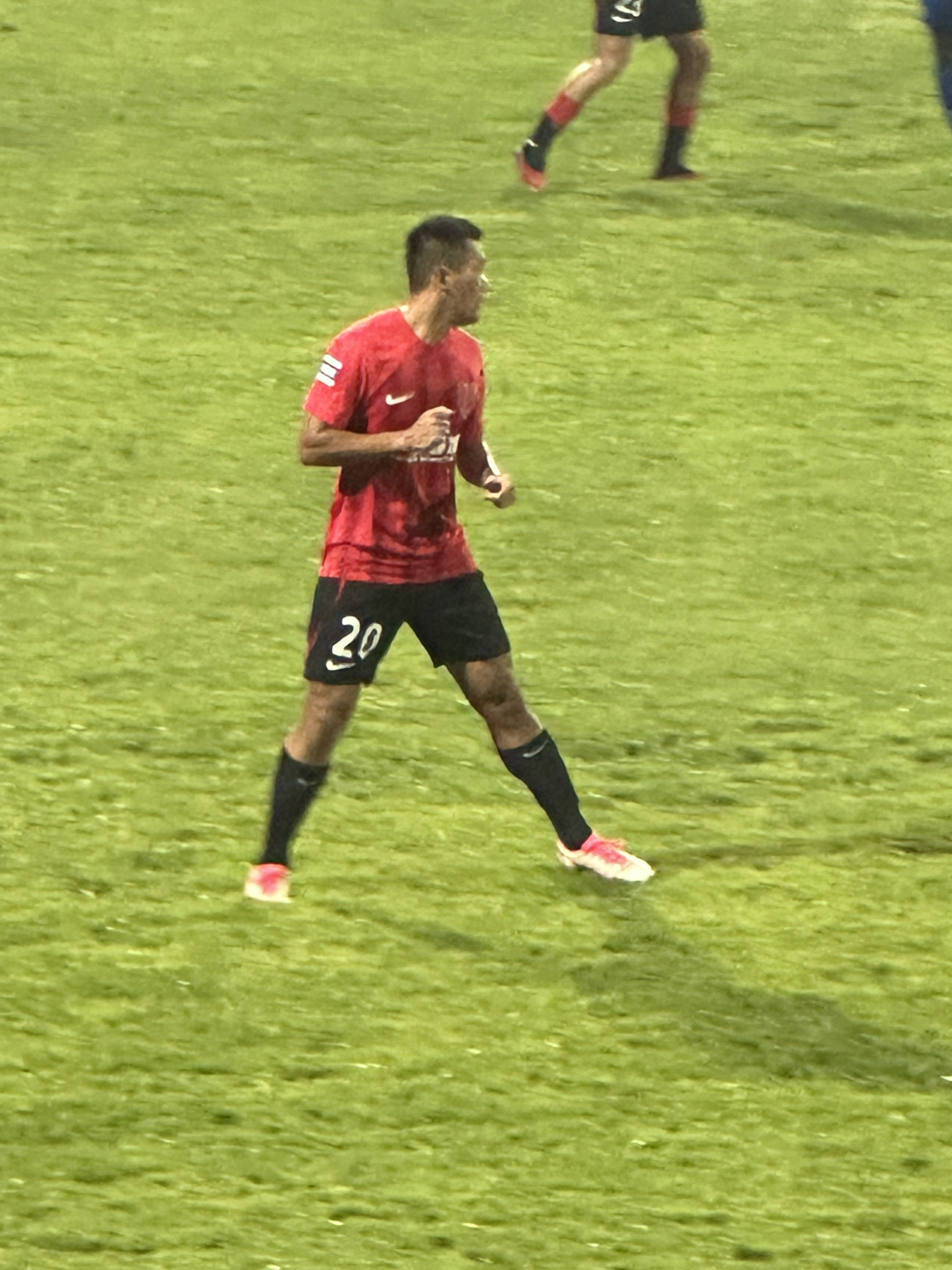
- Tang Miao in August 2024

Personal information
- Full name: Tang Miao
- Date of birth: 16 October 1990 (age 36)
- Place of birth: Dalian, Liaoning, China
- Height: 1.77 m (5 ft 9 1/2 in)
- Positions: Right-back; right wing back

Team information
- Current team: Shenzhen Peng City
- Number: 16

Youth career
- 2002–2010: Beijing Guoan

Senior career*
Years	Team	Apps	(Gls)
2010	Beijing Guoan Talent	17	(0)
2011–2022	Guangzhou City	273	(4)
2023–2025	Chengdu Rongcheng	51	(2)
2025–2026	Yunnan Yukun	23	(1)
2026–	Shenzhen Peng City	12	(0)

International career^{‡}
2012–	China	6	(0)
- * Club domestic league appearances and goals as of 22 November 2026 ‡ National team caps and goals as of 15 June 2021

Tang Miao (Chinese: 唐淼; pinyin: Táng Miǎo; Mandarin pronunciation: [tʰǎŋ mjàʊ]; born 16 October 1990 in Dalian) is a Chinese footballer who currently plays as a right-back or right wing back for Shenzhen Peng City in the Chinese Super League.

== Club career ==
Born in Dalian, Tang moved to Beijing and joined Beijing Guoan youth team at the age of twelve along with twin elder brother Tang Xin in 2002. He was loaned to Beijing's satellite team Beijing Guoan Talent, which would play as a foreign team in Singapore's S. League in the 2010 season. On 7 September 2010, the club was involved in a brawl during a match with Young Lions at Jalan Besar Stadium. Tang was fined S$2,000 by the Football Association of Singapore for participating the brawl. He was released by Beijing Guoan at the end of the season.

After an unsuccessful trial at Shenzhen Ruby, Tang was signed by Shenzhen Phoenix, which later changed its club name to Guangzhou R&F (now known as Guangzhou City), in March 2011. His debut for the club came on 27 March 2011 in a 1–1 home draw against Shenyang Dongjin. He made 17 appearances in the 2011 league season as Guangzhou R&F finished second place in the second division and won promotion back to the top flight at the first attempt. On 23 June 2012, he scored his first senior goal in a 3–2 home defeat against Qingdao Jonoon. On 13 July 2015, Tang suffered a rupture of anterior cruciate ligament in his left knee in a league match against Shanghai SIPG, ruling him out for the rest of the season. He made his return on 23 April 2016 in a 1–1 home draw against Jiangsu Suning. He scored one goal in 25 league appearances in the 2016 season and extended his contract with the club for five years on 25 November 2016.

On 28 April 2017, he played against Tang Xin in a league match against Guizhou Zhicheng, which marked the first time twin brothers had played for opposing teams in the Chinese Super League.

By September 2018, Tang had played 200 games - primarily as a right back or right wing back - for Guangzhou R&F. By August 2019 he had played 200 league games for Guangzhou R&F.

On 17 July 2025, Tang transferred to another Chinese Super League club Yunnan Yukun.

On 16 July 2026, Tang has terminated the contract with Yunnan Yukun and joined Chinese Super League club Shenzhen Peng City as free agent.

== International career ==
On 23 May 2012, Tang received his first call up for China for the international friendly against Spain and Vietnam. On 8 June, he made his debut for China in a 3–0 victory against Vietnam, coming on as a substitute for Yu Hai in the 87th minute.

== Career statistics ==
Statistics accurate as of match played 4 October 2025.

Appearances and goals by club, season and competition
Club	Season	League			National Cup		League Cup		Continental		Total	
Club	Season	Division	Apps	Goals	Apps	Goals	Apps	Goals	Apps	Goals	Apps	Goals
Beijing Guoan Talent	2010	S. League	17	0	0	0	0	0	–		17	0
Guangzhou R&F/ Guangzhou City	2011	China League One	17	0	1	0	–		–		18	0
Guangzhou R&F/ Guangzhou City	2012	Chinese Super League	29	1	2	0	–		–		31	1
Guangzhou R&F/ Guangzhou City	2013	Chinese Super League	25	0	1	0	–		–		26	0
Guangzhou R&F/ Guangzhou City	2014	Chinese Super League	29	0	2	0	–		–		31	0
Guangzhou R&F/ Guangzhou City	2015	Chinese Super League	17	0	0	0	–		7	0	24	0
Guangzhou R&F/ Guangzhou City	2016	Chinese Super League	25	1	5	1	–		–		30	2
Guangzhou R&F/ Guangzhou City	2017	Chinese Super League	30	2	3	1	–		–		33	3
Guangzhou R&F/ Guangzhou City	2018	Chinese Super League	28	0	3	0	–		–		31	0
Guangzhou R&F/ Guangzhou City	2019	Chinese Super League	28	0	1	0	–		–		29	0
Guangzhou R&F/ Guangzhou City	2020	Chinese Super League	19	0	3	0	–		–		22	0
Guangzhou R&F/ Guangzhou City	2021	Chinese Super League	10	0	0	0	–		–		10	0
Guangzhou R&F/ Guangzhou City	2022	Chinese Super League	16	0	0	0	–		–		16	0
Guangzhou R&F/ Guangzhou City	Total		273	4	21	2	0	0	7	0	301	6
Chengdu Rongcheng	2023	Chinese Super League	24	2	0	0	–		–		24	2
Chengdu Rongcheng	2024	Chinese Super League	24	0	3	0	–		–		27	0
Chengdu Rongcheng	2025	Chinese Super League	3	0	0	0	–		–		3	0
Chengdu Rongcheng	Total		51	2	3	0	0	0	0	0	54	2
Yunnan Yukun	2025	Chinese Super League	10	1	2	0	–		–		12	1
Career total			351	7	26	2	0	0	7	0	384	9
