= Davi (footballer, born April 1984) =

Brazilian footballer

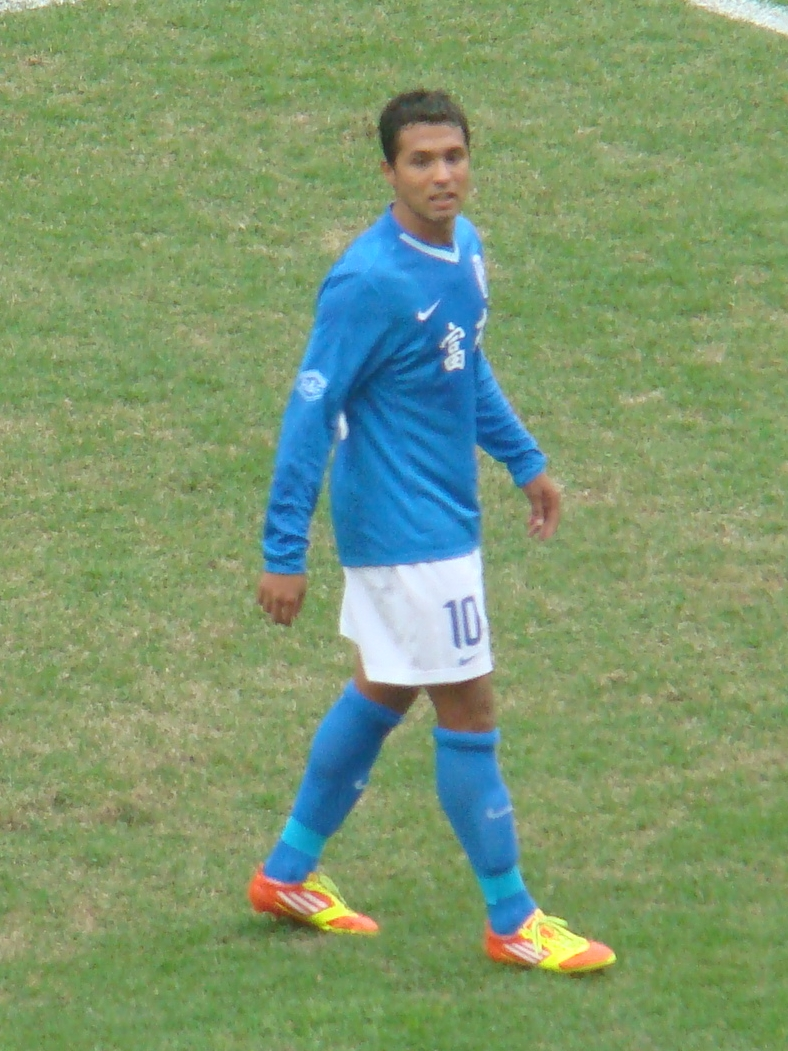

Personal information
- Full name: Davi Rodrigues de Jesus
- Date of birth: April 6, 1984 (age 42)
- Place of birth: Gravataí, Rio Grande do Sul, Brazil
- Height: 1.75 m (5 ft 9 in)
- Position: Attacking midfielder

Youth career
- 1997–2002: Paulista

Senior career*
Years	Team	Apps	(Gls)
2003–2005	Paulista	12	(1)
2005–2006	São Paulo	4	(0)
2006	Bragantino	11	(0)
2007	São Bento	9	(0)
2007	Bragantino	12	(0)
2008	Albirex Niigata	10	(0)
2009–2011	Avaí	23	(5)
2009	→ Paraná (loan)	32	(8)
2011	→ Coritiba (loan)	16	(3)
2012	Coritiba	19	(4)
2012–2014	Guangzhou R&F	79	(24)
2015	Shanghai SIPG	24	(7)
2016	Shanghai Shenxin	14	(7)
2017	Nei Mongol Zhongyou	16	(5)
- * Club domestic league appearances and goals as of 28 October 2017 ‡ National team caps and goals as of January 13, 2016

Davi Rodrigues de Jesus or simply Davi (Brazilian Portuguese: [daˈvi]; born 6 April 1984 in Gravataí) is a Brazilian former footballer who played as a midfielder.

== Career ==
David started in the youth of Paulista de Jundiaí, and later transferred to St. Paulo, but not received recognition at the club in São Paulo. Then migrated to a number of times and was successful in using Bragantino jersey number 10.

In 2009 came to Avai's cast to play the Championship season of Santa Catarina and the Brazilian championship Serie A, but before I play the Brasileirão, was on loan with the Paraná.

For the 2010 season, returned to Avai. Even before David's work in years by the club of Santa Catarina, a survey of Coritiba appeared to have the athlete in your squad, a fact belied by the player who guaranteed the season meet in the Lion Island.

Davi previously played for São Paulo in the Campeonato Brasileiro Série A and has played for Albirex Niigata in the J1 League.

On 8 January 2015, Davi transferred to fellow Chinese Super League side Shanghai SIPG.

In May 2016, Davi signed for China League One side Shanghai Shenxin.
