= Li Zhe (footballer) =

Chinese footballer (born 1981)

Li Zhe 李喆
Personal information
- Full name: Li Zhe
- Date of birth: 20 June 1981 (age 45)
- Place of birth: Shenyang, Liaoning, China
- Height: 1.91 m (6 ft 3 in)
- Position: Defender

Youth career
- Liaoning F.C.

Senior career*
Years	Team	Apps	(Gls)
2001–2002	Liaoning Liaoqing		
2003–2010	Nanjing Yoyo	166	(9)
2011–2015	Guangzhou R&F	58	(2)
- * Club domestic league appearances and goals as of 1 November 2015

Li Zhe (Chinese: 李喆; pinyin: Lǐ Zhé; Mandarin pronunciation: [lì ʈʂɤ̌]; born 20 June 1981 in Shenyang) is a retired Chinese professional football defender.

== Club career ==
Li Zhe started his football career with his hometown football club Liaoning FC's youth team where he would go on to be promoted to the club's second team named Liaoning Xingguang in the 2002 Chinese league season. The club Liaoning Xingguang were allowed to play within the second tier of the Chinese football pyramid and within his debut season Li would go on to aid the club finish sixth within the league at the end of the campaign. In the 2003 league season Liaoning FC would decide to sell Liaoning Xingguang to the SVT Group who formed a new club called Nanjing Yoyo. This saw the whole squad move to Nanjing as part of the deal and Li would stay with Nanjing Yoyo for several seasons where he established himself as regular within the team as they achieved mid-table mediocrity.

On July 21, 2010 Li and the entire first team of Nanjing Yoyo went on strike because of unpaid wages amounting up to 8 million Yuan, before a league game against Guangzhou Evergrande and this saw the club's youth players used as they were thrashed a Chinese record of 10-0. The first team would not be able resolve their wage dispute with the club and the team ultimately went on a losing streak that saw them relegated. With the club in continued financial difficulties and still unable to pay their players they disbanded in 2011. At the start of the 2011 league season he was free to join second tier club Shenzhen Phoenix before they moved to Guangzhou and changed their name to Guangzhou R&F. With his new club he would win promotion with them and in the 2012 Chinese Super League he would score his first league goal for the club on March 10, 2012 against Beijing Guoan in a 3-1 victory. He was sent to reserved squad in the 2015 season and retired from football in January 2016.

== Career statistics ==
Statistics accurate as of match played 1 November 2015

Club performance			League		Cup		League Cup		Continental		Total	
Season	Club	League	Apps	Goals	Apps	Goals	Apps	Goals	Apps	Goals	Apps	Goals
China PR			League		FA Cup		CSL Cup		Asia		Total	
2001	Liaoning Liaoqing	Chinese Yi League			-		-		-			
2002	Liaoning Liaoqing	Chinese Jia-B League	11	0			-		-		11	0
2003	Nanjing Yoyo	Chinese Jia-B League	25	1			-		-		25	1
2004	Nanjing Yoyo	China League One	18	0	0	0	-		-		18	0
2005	Nanjing Yoyo	China League One	24	2	1	0	-		-		25	2
2006	Nanjing Yoyo	China League One	24	0	0	0	-		-		24	0
2007	Nanjing Yoyo	China League One	23	1	-		-		-		23	1
2008	Nanjing Yoyo	China League One	20	3	-		-		-		20	3
2009	Nanjing Yoyo	China League One	24	1	-		-		-		24	1
2010	Nanjing Yoyo	China League One	8	1	-		-		-		8	1
2011	Guangzhou R&F	China League One	19	0	2	0	-		-		21	0
2012	Guangzhou R&F	Chinese Super League	29	2	2	0	-		-		31	2
2013	Guangzhou R&F	Chinese Super League	10	0	0	0	-		-		10	0
2014	Guangzhou R&F	Chinese Super League	0	0	0	0	-		-		0	0
2015	Guangzhou R&F	Chinese Super League	0	0	0	0	-		0	0	0	0
Career total			235	11	5	0	0	0	0	0	240	11

Sporting positions
Preceded by Wang Qiang	Guangzhou R&F F.C. captain 2011–2012	Succeeded by Zhang Yaokun
