= Li Yan (footballer, born 1984) =

Chinese footballer

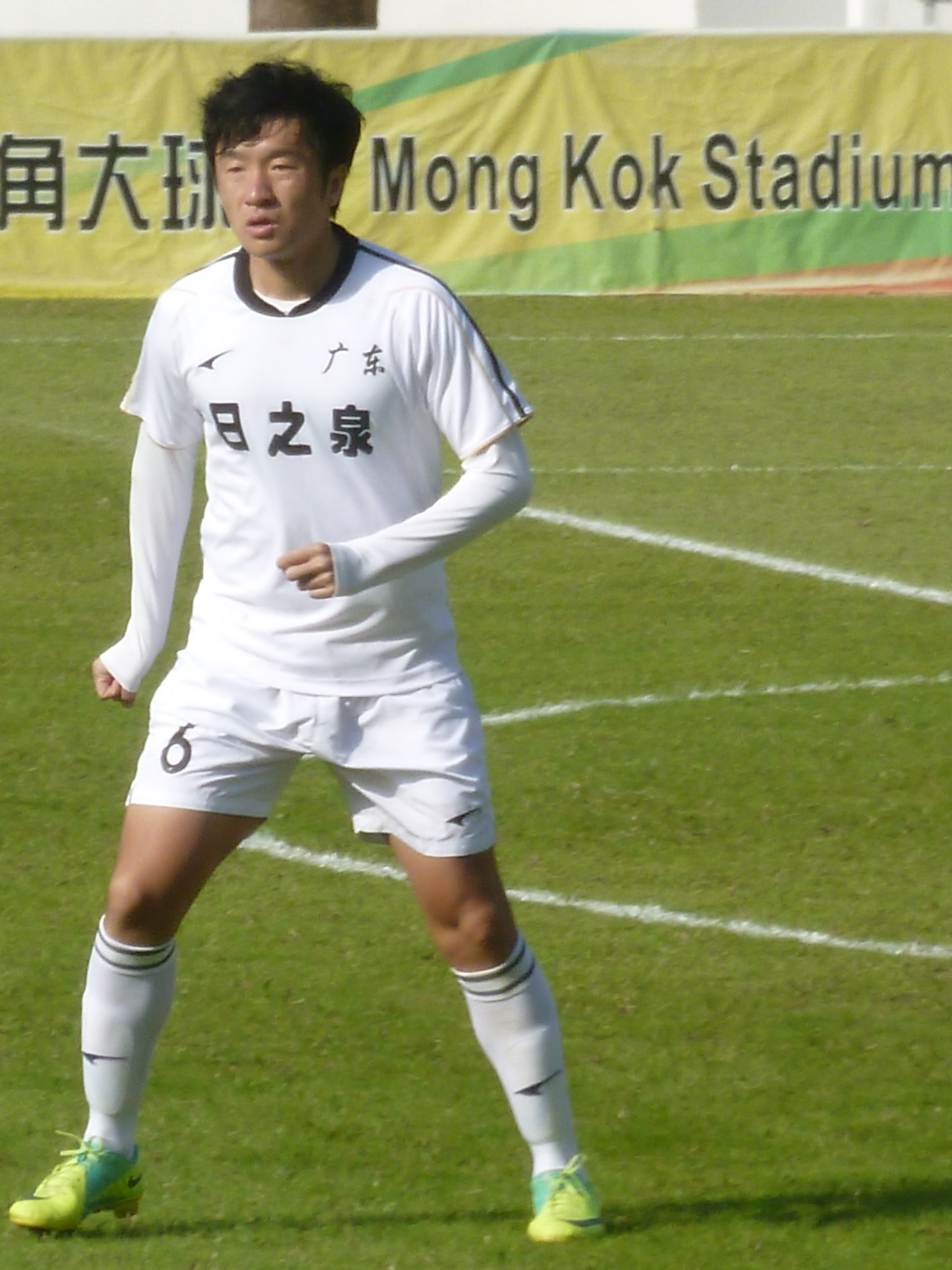

Personal information
- Date of birth: July 19, 1984 (age 42)
- Place of birth: Baoding, Hebei, China
- Height: 1.80 m (5 ft 11 in)
- Position: Midfielder

Team information
- Current team: Shanxi Longjin
- Number: 17

Youth career
- Beijing Kuanli
- 2001–2002: Guangzhou Yida

Senior career*
Years	Team	Apps	(Gls)
2002–2003	Guangzhou Sunray Cave Easter	14	(0)
2004–2012	Guangzhou Evergrande	145	(10)
2004–2005	→ Sunray Cave (loan)	?	(3)
2012	→ Guangzhou R&F (loan)	11	(0)
2013–2015	Guangzhou R&F	57	(1)
2016–2019	Baoding Yingli ETS	86	(8)
2020–	Shanxi Longjin	8	(1)
- * Club domestic league appearances and goals as of 12 October 2019

Li Yan (Chinese: 李岩; pinyin: Li Yán; born July 19, 1984) is a Chinese footballer who plays as a midfielder for Shanxi Longjin in the China League Two.

== Club career ==
Li started his senior career in 2002 with China League Two club Guangzhou Sunray Cave Easter. He made 14 appearances in 2003 league season and moved to second tier club Guangzhou Sunray Cave in 2004, however he was often used as a substitute in the early years. He was loaned out to Guangzhou Easter's second team, which was about to participate in the 2004–05 Hong Kong First Division League season and returned to Guangzhou in the summer of 2005. Li scored his first goal for Guangzhou on 16 July 2005, three days before his 21st birthday. He scored the winning goal in injury time, which ensured Guangzhou win Qingdao Hailifeng 2-1.

In the 2007 league season Shen Xiangfu came in as manager, which saw Li steadily established himself in Guangzhou and was a key player within the club as they went on to win the division title. Within the top tier Li adapted very well within the league and was a vital member of the team that saw Guangzhou establish themselves as regulars within the division, however at the end of the 2009 Chinese Super League campaign it was discovered that the club had fixed a game during 2006 and were punished with relegation. Li would however remain faithful toward Guangzhou and played a key role as they immediately won promotion and the division title at the end of the 2010 league season. As this was going on the Evergrande Real Estate Group invested heavily within the club by bringing in Chinese international Zheng Zhi and South Korean international Cho Won-Hee into central midfield. This would limit Li's playing time and despite being part of the team that went on to win the 2011 Chinese Super League title he only played in a handful of games.

Li was loaned to Guangzhou R&F on 11 July 2012. He made 11 appearances for the Blues in the second half of the 2012 league season. On 9 November, Guangzhou R&F announced that they had made the move permanent with an undisclosed fee.

On 21 January 2016, Li transferred to his hometown club Baoding Yingli ETS in the China League Two.

== Career statistics ==
Statistics accurate as of match played 31 December 2020.

Appearances and goals by club, season and competition
Club	Season	League			National Cup		League Cup		Continental		Total	
Club	Season	Division	Apps	Goals	Apps	Goals	Apps	Goals	Apps	Goals	Apps	Goals
Guangzhou Sunray Cave Easter	2002	China League Two			-		-		-			
Guangzhou Sunray Cave Easter	2003	China League Two	14	0	-		-		-		14	0
Guangzhou Sunray Cave Easter	Total		14	0	0	0	0	0	0	0	14	0
Guangzhou Sunray Cave	2004	China League One	0	0	0	0	-		-		0	0
Guangzhou Sunray Cave	2005	China League One	16	2	2	0	-		-		18	2
Guangzhou Sunray Cave	2006	China League One	19	3	2	0	-		-		21	3
Guangzhou Sunray Cave	2007	China League One	22	2	-		-		-		22	2
Guangzhou Sunray Cave	2008	Chinese Super League	30	1	-		-		-		30	1
Guangzhou Sunray Cave	2009	Chinese Super League	26	0	-		-		-		26	0
Guangzhou Sunray Cave	2010	China League One	23	1	-		-		-		23	1
Guangzhou Sunray Cave	2011	Chinese Super League	6	0	1	0	-		-		7	0
Guangzhou Sunray Cave	2012	Chinese Super League	3	1	0	0	-		0	0	3	1
Guangzhou Sunray Cave	Total		145	10	5	0	0	0	0	0	150	10
Sunray Cave (loan)	2004–05	Hong Kong First Division League	?	3	?	?	?	?	-		?	3
Guangzhou R&F (loan)	2012	Chinese Super League	11	0	1	0	-		-		12	0
Guangzhou R&F	2013	Chinese Super League	28	0	1	0	-		-		29	0
Guangzhou R&F	2014	Chinese Super League	12	0	1	0	-		-		13	0
Guangzhou R&F	2015	Chinese Super League	17	1	1	0	-		3	0	21	1
Guangzhou R&F	Total		57	1	3	0	0	0	3	0	63	0
Baoding Yingli ETS	2016	China League Two	20	0	1	0	-		-		21	0
Baoding Yingli ETS	2017	China League One	22	1	0	0	-		-		22	1
Baoding Yingli ETS	2018	China League Two	19	2	1	0	-		-		20	2
Baoding Yingli ETS	2019	China League Two	25	5	1	0	-		-		27	5
Baoding Yingli ETS	Total		86	8	3	0	0	0	0	0	89	8
Shanxi Longjin	2020	China League Two	8	1	-		-		-		8	1
Career total			321	23	12	0	0	0	3	0	336	23

== Honours ==
=== Club ===
Guangzhou Evergrande

- Chinese Super League: 2011
- China League One: 2007, 2010
- Chinese FA Super Cup: 2012
