= Zhang Yuan (footballer, born 1989) =

Chinese footballer

Zhang Yuan 张远
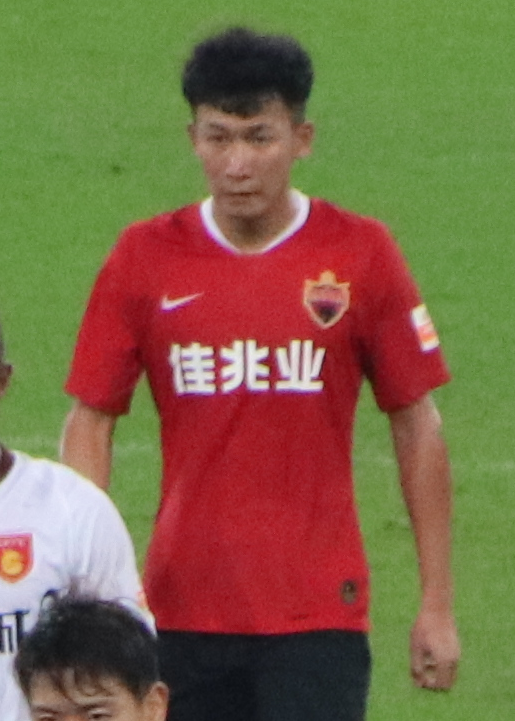
- Zhang Yuan in 2019.

Personal information
- Full name: Zhang Yuan
- Date of birth: December 8, 1989 (age 36)
- Place of birth: Beijing, China
- Height: 1.85 m (6 ft 1 in)
- Positions: Centre-back; right-back; right winger

Youth career
- Renmin University High School

Senior career*
Years	Team	Apps	(Gls)
2008–2011	Chengdu Blades	90	(12)
2012–2016	Guangzhou R&F	105	(9)
2016	→ Beijing Renhe (loan)	21	(2)
2017–2023	Shenzhen FC	143	(1)

International career^{‡}
2007–2008	China U20		
2009–2011	China U23		
2012	China	2	(0)
- * Club domestic league appearances and goals as of 4 November 2023 ‡ National team caps and goals as of 4 November 2013

Zhang Yuan (Chinese: 张远; pinyin: Zhāng Yuǎn; born 8 December 1989) is a Chinese former professional footballer who played as a centre-back, right-back or right winger.

== Club career ==
Zhang Yuan would show a keen interest in baseball and football while in primary school, he chose to play football in the fifth grade and then systemly received football training in Renmin University High School. He was scouted by the Chinese under-20 national team manager Liu Chunming who recommended him to Chengdu Blades. Chengdu would transfer him into their squad at the beginning of the 2008 league season. His height and speed would see Zhang quickly included into the club's first team and he would make his league debut on 29 March 2008 against Liaoning Whowin in a 1-1 draw. Often used out on the wings to utilize his speed, Zhang would gain considerable playing time and go on to score his first league goal on 17 May 2008 against Changsha Ginde in a 1-1 draw. By the following season, Zhang was an established player within the first team, however the club were relegated to the second tier at the end of the 2009 league season when it was discovered that the club match-fixed several games in 2007 when the club won promotion. Zhang would decide to remain faithful towards the club and would go on to play in twenty-one games, scoring five goals in the process when he helped guide the club to second within the league at the end of the 2010 league season gaining immediate promotion back into the Chinese Super League.

On 2 January 2012, Zhang transferred to Chinese Super League side Guangzhou R&F. He would make his debut on 16 March 2012 in a league game against Guangzhou Evergrande F.C. that ended in a 2-0 victory. After the game he would go on to establish himself as a vital member of the team and by the 2014 Chinese Super League campaign he would aid the team to their highest ever league position of third and qualification for the AFC Champions League for the first time. After playing more than 100 times for the club, mainly on the right wing, on 26 February 2016 Zhang was loaned to China League One side Beijing Renhe until 31 December 2016.

In December 2016, Zhang transferred to China League One side Shenzhen FC. His debut appearance would be on 12 March 2017 against Dalian Transcendence F.C. in a league game that ended in a 6-0 victory. Immediately establishing himself as a vital member of the team he go on aid the club to gain promotion to the top tier at the end of the 2018 China League One campaign.

== International career ==
After being scouted by Liu Chunming, he would include him in his squad that part in the 2008 AFC U-19 Championship where he would play three games and score one goal against Tajikistan in a tournament that saw China get knocked out in the quarter-finals. He would go on to be promoted to the Chinese under-23 national team and take part in the 2010 Asian Games, where he was used in defense by the manager Sun Wei, nevertheless he would go on to play in all four games for China where they were knocked out in the last sixteen. His promotion within the national team would continue when he made his debut for the Chinese national team on 6 September 2012 when he played in a friendly match against Sweden in a game that China lost 1-0.

== Career statistics ==
Statistics accurate as of match played 4 November 2023.

Appearances and goals by club, season and competition
Club	Season	League			National Cup		Continental		Other		Total	
Club	Season	Division	Apps	Goals	Apps	Goals	Apps	Goals	Apps	Goals	Apps	Goals
Chengdu Blades	2008	Chinese Super League	18	2	-		-		-		18	2
Chengdu Blades	2009	Chinese Super League	26	4	-		-		-		26	4
Chengdu Blades	2010	China League One	19	5	-		-		-		19	5
Chengdu Blades	2011	Chinese Super League	27	1	1	0	-		-		28	1
Chengdu Blades	Total		90	12	1	0	0	0	0	0	91	12
Guangzhou R&F	2012	Chinese Super League	29	5	0	0	-		-		29	5
Guangzhou R&F	2013	Chinese Super League	27	3	2	0	-		-		29	3
Guangzhou R&F	2014	Chinese Super League	27	1	2	0	-		-		29	1
Guangzhou R&F	2015	Chinese Super League	22	0	2	0	6	0	-		30	0
Guangzhou R&F	Total		105	9	6	0	6	0	0	0	117	9
Beijing Renhe (Loan)	2016	China League One	21	2	0	0	-		-		21	2
Shenzhen	2017	China League One	29	0	0	0	-		-		29	0
Shenzhen	2018	China League One	28	0	1	0	-		-		29	0
Shenzhen	2019	Chinese Super League	16	1	1	0	-		-		17	1
Shenzhen	2020	Chinese Super League	15	0	0	0	-		-		15	0
Shenzhen	2021	Chinese Super League	12	0	4	0	-		-		16	0
Shenzhen	2022	Chinese Super League	26	0	0	0	-		-		26	0
Shenzhen	2023	Chinese Super League	17	0	1	0	-		-		18	0
Shenzhen	Total		143	1	7	0	0	0	0	0	150	1
Career total			359	24	14	0	6	0	0	0	379	24
