= Xu Bo =

Chinese footballer

Xu Bo 许博
Personal information
- Full name: Xu Bo
- Date of birth: 18 May 1985 (age 41)
- Place of birth: Shenyang, Liaoning, China
- Height: 1.85 m (6 ft 1 in)
- Position: Defender

Senior career*
Years	Team	Apps	(Gls)
2004–2014	Guangzhou R&F	229	(7)
2015–2017	Shijiazhuang Yongchang	66	(1)
2018	Shenyang Urban	23	(3)

International career^{‡}
2013	China	2	(0)
- * Club domestic league appearances and goals as of 13 October 2018 ‡ National team caps and goals as of 31 December 2013

Xu Bo (Chinese: 许博; Chinese: 許博; pinyin: Xǔ Bó; born 18 May 1985 in Shenyang) is a Chinese footballer.

== Club career ==
Xu Bo began his football career with Shenyang Ginde and made his league debut on 11 September 2004 against Chongqing Lifan in a 1-0 defeat. After he made his debut, he was used sparingly as a versatile substitute who could play in numerous defensive positions throughout the rest of the season. The next season saw him settle within the team's midfield and score his first league goal against Inter Shanghai on 17 April 2005 in a 2-1 defeat. For the next several seasons, he was an integral member of the team and was part of the squad that moved to Changsha while the club renamed themselves Changsha Ginde. By the end of the 2010 season, Xu was unfortunately part of the team that was relegated at the end of the campaign. Xu stayed with the club as they eventually moved to Guangzhou and renamed themselves Guangzhou R&F, which seemed to revive the club's fortunes and saw them win promotion at the end of the 2011 season.

On 1 January 2015, Xu transferred to fellow Chinese Super League side Shijiazhuang Yongchang. He made his debut for Shijiazhuang on 9 March 2015 in a 2–1 away defeat against Guangzhou Evergrande. On 24 June 2015, he scored his first goal for the club in a 1–1 draw against Shandong Luneng.

== International career ==
On 23 May 2012, Xu received his first call up to the Chinese national team for friendlies against Spain and Vietnam. However, he suffered an injury in the training, ruling him out for one month. His debut for the national team came on 30 January 2013 in an international friendly against Oman, coming on as a substitute for Zhao Peng.

== Career statistics ==
Statistics accurate as of match played 13 October 2018

Club performance			League		Cup		League Cup		Continental		Total	
Season	Club	League	Apps	Goals	Apps	Goals	Apps	Goals	Apps	Goals	Apps	Goals
China PR			League		FA Cup		CSL Cup		Asia		Total	
2004	Guangzhou R&F	Chinese Super League	6	0	0	0	0	0	-		6	0
2005	Guangzhou R&F	Chinese Super League	23	1	0	0	2	0	-		25	1
2006	Guangzhou R&F	Chinese Super League	26	3	-		-		-		26	3
2007	Guangzhou R&F	Chinese Super League	23	1	-		-		-		23	1
2008	Guangzhou R&F	Chinese Super League	24	0	-		-		-		24	0
2009	Guangzhou R&F	Chinese Super League	27	0	-		-		-		27	0
2010	Guangzhou R&F	Chinese Super League	26	1	-		-		-		26	1
2011	Guangzhou R&F	China League One	25	1	0	0	-		-		25	1
2012	Guangzhou R&F	Chinese Super League	19	0	1	0	-		-		20	0
2013	Guangzhou R&F	Chinese Super League	15	0	2	0	-		-		17	0
2014	Guangzhou R&F	Chinese Super League	15	0	1	1	-		-		16	1
2015	Shijiazhuang Yongchang	Chinese Super League	26	1	0	0	-		-		26	1
2016	Shijiazhuang Yongchang	Chinese Super League	16	0	0	0	-		-		16	0
2017	Shijiazhuang Yongchang	China League One	24	0	0	0	-		-		24	0
2018	Shenyang Urban	China League Two	23	3	3	1	-		-		26	4
Total	China PR		318	11	7	2	2	0	0	0	327	13
