= Zhang Shuo (footballer) =

Chinese footballer

Zhang Shuo 张烁
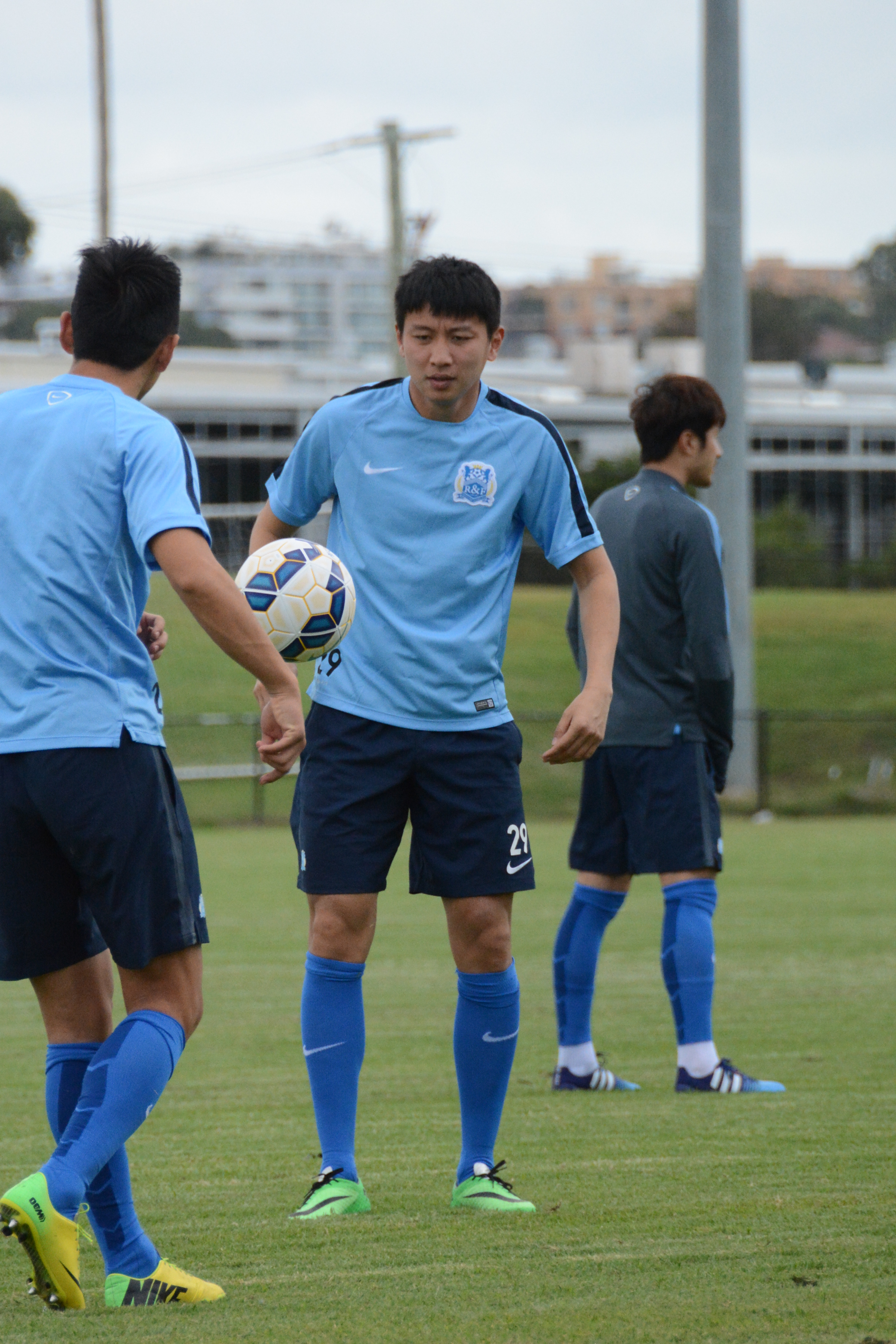

Personal information
- Full name: Zhang Shuo
- Date of birth: 17 September 1983 (age 43)
- Place of birth: Beijing, China
- Height: 1.84 m (6 ft 1/2 in)
- Position: Striker

Youth career
- 2000–2001: Tianjin Teda

Senior career*
Years	Team	Apps	(Gls)
2002–2010	Tianjin Teda	131	(31)
2010	Persik Kediri	10	(3)
2010–2011	Newcastle Jets	8	(1)
2011–2015	Guangzhou R&F	51	(12)
2015	→ Tianjin Songjiang (loan)	12	(1)
2016–2017	Tianjin Quanjian	7	(0)
2017	→ Jiangsu Yancheng Dingli (loan)	22	(2)

International career^{‡}
2003–2005	China PR	10	(1)
Medal record
Representing China
Men's football
AFC Asian Cup
Silver medal – second place	2004 China	Team
East Asian Football Championship
Bronze medal – third place	2003 Japan	Team
East Asian Games
Gold medal – first place	2001 Macau	Football
- * Club domestic league appearances and goals as of 14 October 2017 ‡ National team caps and goals as of 4 November 2014

Zhang Shuo (Chinese: 张烁; pinyin: Zhāng Shuò) is a Chinese former footballer who played as a striker. He has also played for the Chinese national team in 2003 to 2005.

== Club career ==
Though Zhang Shuo was born in Beijing he would move to Tianjin to play for the Tianjin Teda youth team. In 2002, he would graduate to the senior team where in his debut season he would play in seven games scoring his first goal. The following season he would establish himself as a first choice regular by playing in 26 league games and scoring 6 goals. He has continued to be a regular striker for Tianjin Teda despite not being the most prolific striker.

As of March 2010, it is reported that Zhang has signed a professional contract with the Indonesian Super League side Persik Kediri.

On 6 July 2010 Zhang signed a one-year deal with the Newcastle Jets for the 2010–2011 Hyundai A-League season. After a less than impressive season, where he failed to regularly make the starting team, he was released.

Zhang returned to China and signed a contract with China League One club Shenzhen Phoenix (later name changed to Guangzhou R&F). He scored 8 goals in 22 appearances as Guangzhou R&F finished second place in the League One and won promotion back to the top flight at the first attempt. On 16 June 2015, Zhang was loaned to China League One side Tianjin Songjiang until 31 December 2015.

On 2 January 2016, Zhang transferred to China League One side Tianjin Quanjian. In March, Zhang was loaned to League Two side Jiangsu Yancheng Dingli until 31 December 2017.

== International career ==
After his performances in 2003 for Tianjin Teda, Zhang Shuo was called up to the senior national team and made his debut in an international friendly against Chile in a 0–0 draw. After several friendlies he was called up to the 2003 East Asian Football Championship squad where he made one appearance in a disappointing tournament for China PR. Nevertheless, Zhang Shuo would still continue to be a regular within the Chinese squad and score his first international goal in an international friendly against Lebanon on 3 July 2004 in a 6–0 thrashing. This was enough for Zhang Shuo to be included in the 2004 AFC Asian Cup squad, however he did not make any appearances in the tournament.

== Honours ==
=== Club ===
Tianjin Quanjian F.C.

- China League One: 2016
