= 2013 Chinese FA Cup =

2013 The Chinese Football Association Cup
CFA Cup

Tournament details
- Country: China
- Teams: 48

Final positions
- Champions: Guizhou Moutai (1st title)
- Runners-up: Guangzhou Evergrande
- AFC Champions League: Guizhou Moutai

Tournament statistics
- Matches played: 50
- Goals scored: 168 (3.36 per match)
- Top goal scorer(s): (Nigeria) Peter Utaka (4 goals)

Awards
- Best player: (Argentina) Darío Conca

TOSHIBA 2013 Chinese FA Cup (Chinese: 东芝2013中国足球协会杯) is the 15th edition of Chinese FA Cup. The match of first round was kicked off on 31 March 2013, and finished on 7 December 2013.

The cup title sponsor is Japanese company Toshiba.

== Participants ==
=== Chinese Super League ===
Total 16 teams took part in 2013 CFA Cup.

- Beijing Guoan
- Changchun Yatai
- Dalian Aerbin
- Guangzhou Evergrande^{TH}
- Guangzhou R&F
- Guizhou Moutai
- Hangzhou Greentown
- Jiangsu Sainty
- Liaoning Whowin
- Qingdao Jonoon
- Shandong Luneng Taishan
- Shanghai East Asia
- Shanghai Shenhua
- Shanghai Shenxin
- Tianjin Teda
- Wuhan Zall

=== China League One ===
Total 16 teams took part in 2013 CFA Cup.

- Beijing BIT
- Beijing Baxy
- Chengdu Blades
- Chongqing FC
- Chongqing Lifan
- Guangdong Sunray Cave
- Guizhou Zhicheng
- Harbin Yiteng
- Henan Jianye
- Hubei China-Kyle
- Hunan Billows
- Shenyang Shenbei
- Shenzhen Ruby
- Shijiazhuang Yongchang Junhao
- Tianjin Songjiang
- Yanbian Baekdu Tigers

=== China League Two & amateur team ===
16 teams from 2013 China League Two, 2012 China Amateur Football League Final stage, Chinese Collegiate Football League and the Vision China Championship were selected to take part in 2013 CFA Cup.

- Dali Ruilong (League Two)
- Hebei Zhongji (League Two)
- Meixian Hakka (League Two)
- Qinghai Senke (League Two)
- Shaanxi Laochenggen (League Two)
- Hohhot Dongjin (League Two)
- Shenzhen Fengpeng (League Two)
- Xinjiang Youth (League Two)
- Dalian Longjuanfeng (Amateur League)
- Qingdao Kunpeng (Amateur League)
- Suzhou Jinfu (Amateur League)
- Shenyang Riverside Garden (Amateur League)
- Jiaozhou Fengfa (Vision China Championship)
- Wuhan Hongxing (Vision China Championship)
- Zibo Sunday (Vision China Championship)
- Tongji University (Collegiate League)

== Results ==
- Times listed are UTC+8

=== First round ===
30 March	Jiaozhou Fengfa	1 – 2	Xinjiang Youth	Tiantai Stadium, Qingdao
15:30	Feng Tao 38'		Esqerjan 15'; Ehme 58'	Referee: Fu Ming

31 March	Meixian Hakka	1 – 1 (6 – 7 p)	Qingdao Kunpeng	Meixian Tsang Hin-chi Stadium, Mei County
15:00	Chen Quanjun 84'		Liu Bin 9'	Referee: Zhong Jun
	Penalties
	(penalty scored) (penalty scored) (penalty scored) (penalty scored) (penalty scored) (penalty scored); Zhang Xingbo (penalty missed)		Penalty scored

31 March	Hebei Zhongji	2 – 1	Dalian Longjuanfeng	Hebei Normal University Stadium, Shijiazhuang
15:00	Zhang Gen 3'; Zhang Lifeng 62'		Wang Xin 39'	Referee: Tao Rancheng

31 March	Shaanxi Laochenggen	7 – 0	Zibo Sunday	Shaanxi Province Stadium, Xi'an
15:00	Yang Jingxuan 10'; Wang Si 16'; Yang Lei 48'; Zheng Lei 60', 69'; Liu Yang 65'; Shen Tianfeng 82'			Referee: Wang Di

31 March	Qinghai Senke	5 – 1	Shenyang Riverside Garden	Xining Ximen Stadium, Xining
15:00	Liu Cheng 6'; Zhang Yu 53'; Shan Xialu 66'; Shi Jun 75', 83'		Guan Hongyu 56'	Referee: Jin jingyuan

31 March	Shenzhen Fengpeng	2 – 2 (2 – 3 p)	Wuhan Hongxing	Universiade Center, Shenzhen
15:00	Zhang Hongbin 29'; Tang Miao 84'		Chen Hao 8'; Zhang Weijun 16'	Referee: Chen Gang
	Penalties
	Di You (penalty scored); Liu Pujin (penalty missed); Li Yingjian (penalty scored); Zhou Jun (penalty missed); Zhang Hongbin (penalty missed)		(penalty scored) Chen Hao (penalty missed) (penalty scored); (penalty scored) Deng Sheng

6 April	Dali Ruilong	4 – 1	Suzhou Jinfu	Dali Stadium, Dali
15:00	Cui Ri 12', 49'; Yang Zengqi 39'; Tian Yong 89'		Chen Bin 90+1'	Referee: Zhang Cheng

7 April	Tongji University	2 – 5	Hohhot Dongjin	Century Park Stadium, Shanghai
15:00	Wang Zhewei 10'; Ma Xiao 12'		Jiang Xiaoyu 26'; Huang Zhun 56'; Mu Yongjie 63'; Le Beisi 75'; Zhu Dayi 90+3'	Referee: Sun Bing

=== Second round ===
24 April	Shenyang Shenbei	0 – 0 (3 – 1 p)	Beijing Baxy	Shenyang Sports University Stadium, Shenyang
14:30				Attendance: 1,210; Referee: Ma Ning
	Penalties
	José Duarte (penalty scored) (penalty scored) (penalty scored)		(penalty missed) Zhao Jun (penalty missed) (penalty scored) (penalty missed)

24 April	Tianjin Songjiang	2 – 1	Guizhou Zhicheng	Tianjin Tuanbo Football Stadium, Tianjin
15:00	Rong Yu 45+1' (pen.), 80' (pen.)		Gu Zhongqing 86' (pen.)	Attendance: 816; Referee: Tao Rancheng

24 April	Chengdu Blades	0 – 0 (3 – 4 p)	Dali Ruilong	Nanhu Stadium, Zigong
15:00				Attendance: 3,150; Referee: Ma Ye
	Penalties
	(penalty scored); Yang Zezhi (penalty missed); Wang Erzhuo (penalty missed) (penalty scored) (penalty scored)		(penalty scored) Yang Zengqi (penalty scored) (penalty scored) (penalty missed) (penalty scored)

24 April	Hunan Billows	3 – 1	Beijing BIT	Yiyang Stadium, Yiyang
15:00	Liu Qing 33'; Liu Xinyu 38', 44'		Xie Wenkai 52'	Attendance: 311; Referee: Lin Jun

24 April	Chongqing FC	2 – 1	Qingdao Kunpeng	Chongqing Olympic Sports Center, Chongqing
15:30	Ma Xiaolei 76', 86'		Liu Bin 78'	Attendance: 500; Referee: He Xiaohu

24 April	Shijiazhuang Yongchang Junhao	1 – 0	Hebei Zhongji	Yutong International Sports Center, Shijiazhuang
15:30	Yang Lin 65'			Attendance: 4,500; Referee: Zhang Cheng

24 April	Guangdong Sunray Cave	2 – 0	Hohhot Dongjin	Dongguan Nancheng Sports Park Stadium, Dongguan
15:30	Zhang Yong 13'; Yang Bin 83'			Attendance: 201; Referee: Gu Chunhan

24 April	Henan Jianye	1 – 0	Shaanxi Laochenggen	Zhengzhou Hanghai Stadium, Zhengzhou
19:30	Huang Xiyang 82'			Attendance: 4,106; Referee: Ma Li

24 April	Shenzhen Moutai Ruby	3 – 0	Qinghai Senke	Bao'an Stadium, Shenzhen
19:30	Ling Sihao 39'; Yu Le 75', 78'			Attendance: 1,021; Referee: Guan Xing

24 April	Chongqing Lifan	4 – 1	Xinjiang Youth	Nanchuan Sports Center, Chongqing
19:30	Zhang Chiming 23', 45+1'; Wang Weicheng 29'; Xu Xiaobo 77'		Elijan 90+3'	Attendance: 3,408; Referee: Zhou Gang

25 April	Wuhan Hongxing	3 – 0	Yanbian Baekdu Tigers	Hankou Culture & Sports Center, Wuhan
15:30	Zhang Xiaoxiao 11'; Huang Lei 15'; Deng Sheng 19'			Attendance: 8,000; Referee: Li Jun

7 May	Harbin Yiteng	3 – 0	Hubei China-Kyle	Harbin International Conference Exhibition and Sports Center, Harbin
15:00	Liu Xiaolong 10'; Li Jiahe 57'; Rodrigo 86'			Attendance: 3,960; Referee: Sun Lei

=== Third round ===
21 May	Dalian Aerbin	2 – 0	Tianjin Songjiang	Jinzhou Stadium, Dalian
19:00	Dong Xuesheng 45+1'; Hoarau 62'			Attendance: 4,252; Referee: Zhang Miao

21 May	Guangzhou R&F	4 – 1	Chongqing FC	Yuexiushan Stadium, Guangzhou
19:30	Lu Lin 48', 63'; Zhang Shuo 78'; Davi 86' (pen.)		Zhai Zhaoyu 82'	Attendance: 1,935; Referee: Zhong Jun

21 May	Shanghai East Asia	2 – 2 (4 – 3 p)	Chongqing Lifan	Shanghai Stadium, Shanghai
19:45	Mao Jiakang 28'; Lin Chuangyi 78'		Wang Weicheng 48'; Šantalab 90'	Attendance: 3,048; Referee: Sun Bing
	Penalties
	Zheng Dalun (penalty missed); Wu Yuyin (penalty scored); Ji Xiaoxuan (penalty scored); Geng Jiaqi (penalty scored); Fu Huan (penalty scored)		(penalty scored) Šantalab; (penalty scored) Wu Peng; (penalty missed) Cui Ming; (penalty scored) Luo Xin; (penalty missed) Feng Jing

22 May	Liaoning Whowin	1 – 1 (4 – 3 p)	Shenyang Shenbei	Tiexi New District Sports Center, Shenyang
15:00	Brandán 23'		Nan Yunqi 83'	Attendance: 7,952; Referee: Fu Ming
	Penalties
	Edu (penalty scored); Chamanga (penalty scored); Sun Shilin (penalty scored); Wang Liang (penalty scored)		(penalty scored) Li Xingcan; (penalty missed) Nan Yunqi; (penalty scored) Rendulić; (penalty scored) Wen Huyi; (penalty missed) Liu Chao

22 May	Changchun Yatai	1 – 0	Henan Jianye	Development Area Stadium, Changchun
15:30	Liu Weidong 5'			Attendance: 2,000; Referee: Wang Zhe

22 May	Shanghai Shenxin	2 – 0	Hunan Billows	Jinshan Sports Centre, Shanghai
15:30	Zhao Zuojun 71'; Jaílton Paraíba 75'			Attendance: 320; Referee: Ma Ning

22 May	Qingdao Jonoon	5 – 2	Harbin Yiteng	Tiantai Stadium, Qingdao
15:30	Karimov 35'; Xu Jingjie 43'; Zhu Shiyu 60'; Song Bo 76' (pen.); Song Wenjie 80'		Steer 36'; Li Jiahe 84'	Attendance: 1,583; Referee: Zhou Gang

22 May	Tianjin Teda	2 – 1	Shenzhen Ruby	Olympic Center Stadium, Tianjin
19:30	Jovančić 15'; Dinélson 83'		Gueye 7'	Attendance: 5,569; Referee: Chen Gang

22 May	Wuhan Zall	0 – 0 (1 – 4 p)	Guangdong Sunray Cave	Wuhan Sports Center Stadium, Wuhan
19:30				Attendance: 3,948; Referee: He Xiaohu
	Penalties
	Dembélé (penalty missed); Bentley (penalty missed); Tan Si (penalty scored)		(penalty scored) Awal; (penalty scored) Dorielton; (penalty scored) Yang Jian; (penalty scored) Leung Chun Pong

22 May	Shandong Luneng Taishan	3 – 1	Shijiazhuang Yongchang Junhao	Olympic Sports Luneng Stadium, Jinan
19:35	Niculae 23'; Pisculichi 25'; Wang Gang 51'		Ge Yuxiang 43'	Attendance: 6,816; Referee: Huang Yejun

22 May	Hangzhou Daikin Greentown	1 – 0	Wuhan Hongxing	Yellow Dragon Sports Center, Hangzhou
19:35	Zhang Xian 76' (o.g.)			Attendance: 2,258; Referee: Yao Qing

22 May	Shanghai Shenhua	2 – 3	Dali Travel Ruilong	Hongkou Football Stadium, Shanghai
19:45	Wang Changqing 34'; Cao Yunding 89'		Wang Peng 13'; Zheng Wangyang 72'; Ma Sai 76'	Attendance: 3,123; Referee: Zhang Yue

=== Fourth round ===
10 July	Liaoning Whowin	5 – 0	Tianjin Teda	Huludao Stadium, Huludao
15:30	Edu 14', 33', 44'; Brandán 81', 88'			Attendance: 23,813; Referee: Huang Yejun

10 July	Qingdao Jonoon	0 – 0 (4 - 2 p)	Shanghai East Asia	Tiantai Stadium, Qingdao
15:30				Attendance: 1,153; Referee: Fan Qi
	Penalties
	Liu Jian (penalty scored); Zhu Shiyu (penalty scored); Yao Jiangshan (penalty scored); Zhu Jianrong (penalty missed); Gustavo (penalty scored)		(penalty scored) Cabezas; (penalty missed) Geng Jiaqi; (penalty scored) Ibini-Isei; (penalty missed) Wang Shenchao

10 July	Dalian Aerbin	1 – 0	Shandong Luneng Taishan	Jinzhou Stadium, Dalian
19:00	Hoarau 11'			Attendance: 6,000; Referee: Li Jun

10 July	Guizhou Moutai	1 – 0	Changchun Yatai	Guiyang Olympic Centre, Guiyang
19:30	Muslimović 64'			Attendance: 11,059; Referee: He Xiaohu

10 July	Beijing Guoan	5 – 1	Guangdong Sunray Cave	Workers Stadium, Beijing
19:30	Zhang Xizhe 39'; Wang Xiaolong 42', 49'; Guerrón 83'; Shao Jiayi 90+2'		Dorielton 54'	Attendance: 26,138; Referee: Zhang Lei

10 July	Hangzhou Daikin Greentown	2 – 0	Shanghai Shenxin	Yellow Dragon Sports Center, Hangzhou
19:35	Cao Xuan 40'; Oguro 45'			Attendance: 4,362; Referee: Fu Ming

10 July	Jiangsu Sainty	4 – 1	Guangzhou R&F	Nanjing Olympic Sports Center, Nanjing
19:40	Liu Jianye 8'; Wu Xi 18'; Jevtić 42', 77'		Davi 49'	Attendance: 18,586; Referee: Ai Kun

10 July	Guangzhou Evergrande	7 – 1	Dali Travel Ruilong	Tianhe Stadium, Guangzhou
20:00	Peng Xinli 39', 70'; Ni Bo 48', 90+1'; Feng Junyan 57'; Zhao Peng 74'; Gao Lin 87'		Ma Sai 89' (pen.)	Attendance: 37,893; Referee: Zhong Jun

=== Quarter-finals ===
7 August	Guizhou Moutai	4 – 0	Liaoning Whowin	Guiyang Olympic Centre, Guiyang
19:00	Nano 15'; Muslimović 70'; Yang Yihu 80'; Yan Xiangchuang 87'			Attendance: 13,865; Referee: Fan Qi

7 August	Jiangsu Sainty	1 – 2	Dalian Aerbin	Zhenjiang Sports and Exhibition Center, Zhenjiang
19:40	Salihi 66'		Hoarau 9'; Sun Bo 89'	Attendance: 23,375; Referee: Tan Hai

7 August	Beijing Guoan	5 – 2	Qingdao Jonoon	Workers Stadium, Beijing
19:45	Xu Yunlong 31'; Wang Hao 33'; Utaka 45+1'; Guerrón 47', 58'		Yang Yun 16' (o.g.); Caballero 26'	Attendance: 28,025; Referee: Li Jun

7 August	Guangzhou Evergrande	2 – 2 (5 - 3 p)	Hangzhou Daikin Greentown	Tianhe Stadium, Guangzhou
20:00	Yang Chaosheng 39'; Shewket Yalqun 74'		Oguro 36', 63'	Attendance: 36,114; Referee: Huang Yejun
	Penalties
	Zheng Long (penalty scored); Hu Weiwei (penalty scored); Feng Junyan (penalty scored); Yi Teng (penalty scored); Rong Hao (penalty scored)		(penalty missed) Wang Song; (penalty scored) Oguro; (penalty scored) Jiang Bo; (penalty scored) Angan

=== Semi-finals ===
==== First leg ====
23 October	Dalian Aerbin	1 – 2	Guizhou Moutai	Jinzhou Stadium, Dalian
19:00	Mullen 8'		Muslimović 18'; Misimović 77'	Attendance: 3,218; Referee: Wang Di

23 November	Beijing Guoan	0 – 1	Guangzhou Evergrande	Workers Stadium, Beijing
19:00			Muriqui 79'	Attendance: 49,140; Referee: Zhong Jun

==== Second leg ====
6 November	Guizhou Moutai	2 – 1	Dalian Aerbin	Guiyang Olympic Centre, Guiyang
16:00	Misimović 7'; Qu Bo 47'		Yu Dabao 40'	Attendance: 20,572; Referee: Ma Ning

Guizhou Moutai won 4–2 on aggregate.

27 November	Guangzhou Evergrande	6 – 3	Beijing Guoan	Tianhe Stadium, Guangzhou
20:00	Elkeson 33'; Conca 43', 89'; Zhang Linpeng 58'; Huang Bowen 70'; Muriqui 79'		Utaka 55', 67', 69'	Attendance: 35,800; Referee: Li Jun

Guangzhou Evergrande won 7–3 on aggregate.

=== Final ===
==== First leg ====
1 December
16:00

Guizhou Moutai	2 - 0	Guangzhou Evergrande
Yu Hai 51', 68'

Guiyang Olympic Sports Center, Guiyang
Attendance: 47,893
Referee: Hiroyuki Kimura (Japan)

Guizhou Moutai	Guangzhou Evergrande

Guizhou:
GK	12	(China) Zhang Lie
RB	23	(Chinese Taipei) Xavier Chen
CB	4	(Australia) Jonas Salley	(yellow card) 20'
CB	17	(China) Sun Jihai (c)	(yellow card) 53'
LB	3	(China) Zhang Chenglin
DM	7	(Spain) Nano
DM	29	(China) Yang Hao
AM	10	(Bosnia and Herzegovina) Zvjezdan Misimović
LW	21	(China) Yu Hai
RW	27	(China) Qu Bo	(yellow card) 38'	(substituted off) 88'
CF	9	(Bosnia and Herzegovina) Zlatan Muslimović		(substituted off) 77'
Substitutes:
GK	22	(China) Sheng Peng
DF	5	(China) Wu Wei		(substituted on) 88'
DF	19	(China) Liu Tianqi
DF	35	(China) Wan Houliang
MF	6	(China) Fan Yunlong
MF	8	(China) Li Chunyu
FW	11	(Spain) Rafa Jordà		(substituted on) 77'
Coach:
(China) Gong Lei

Guangzhou:
GK	1	(China) Zeng Cheng
RB	5	(China) Zhang Linpeng	(yellow card) 90+3'
CB	6	(China) Feng Xiaoting		(substituted off) 68'
CB	28	(South Korea) Kim Young-Gwon
LB	32	(China) Sun Xiang
DM	16	(China) Huang Bowen
DM	10	(China) Zheng Zhi (c)		(substituted off) 60'
AM	15	(Argentina) Darío Conca
LW	11	(Brazil) Muriqui	(yellow card) 20'
RW	29	(China) Gao Lin		(substituted off) 46'
CF	9	(Brazil) Elkeson	(red card) 31'
Substitutes:
GK	22	(China) Li Shuai
DF	3	(China) Yi Teng
DF	4	(China) Zhao Peng
MF	7	(China) Feng Junyan		(substituted on) 60'
MF	8	(China) Qin Sheng
MF	37	(China) Zhao Xuri	(yellow card) 75'	(substituted on) 46'
FW	30	(China) Yang Chaosheng		(substituted on) 68'
Coach:
(Italy) Marcello Lippi

Assistant referees:
Li Dongnan
Tong Yong
Fourth official:
Fu Ming

==== Second leg ====
7 December
16:00

Guangzhou Evergrande	2 - 1	Guizhou Moutai
Feng Junyan 59'; Conca 61'		Yu Hai 27'

Tianhe Stadium, Guangzhou
Attendance: 46,898
Referee: Hiroyoshi Takayama (Japan)

Guangzhou Evergrande	Guizhou Moutai

Guangzhou:
GK	1	(China) Zeng Cheng
RB	5	(China) Zhang Linpeng
CB	6	(China) Feng Xiaoting		(substituted off) 60'
CB	28	(South Korea) Kim Young-Gwon
LB	32	(China) Sun Xiang	(yellow card) 90+5'
DM	16	(China) Huang Bowen
DM	10	(China) Zheng Zhi (c)	(yellow card) 90'
AM	15	(Argentina) Darío Conca
LW	29	(China) Gao Lin	(yellow card) 15'
RW	33	(China) Rong Hao		(substituted off) 83'
CF	30	(China) Yang Chaosheng		(substituted off) 46'
Substitutes:
GK	22	(China) Li Shuai
DF	3	(China) Yi Teng
DF	4	(China) Zhao Peng
MF	7	(China) Feng Junyan		(substituted on) 46'
MF	8	(China) Qin Sheng	(yellow card) 71'	(substituted on) 60'
MF	24	(China) Shi Hongjun
FW	34	(China) Hu Weiwei		(substituted on) 83'
Coach:
(Italy) Marcello Lippi

Guizhou:
GK	12	(China) Zhang Lie
RB	23	(Chinese Taipei) Xavier Chen
CB	4	(Australia) Jonas Salley
CB	17	(China) Sun Jihai (c)
LB	3	(China) Zhang Chenglin		(substituted off) 76'
DM	7	(Spain) Nano
DM	29	(China) Yang Hao		(substituted off) 64'
AM	10	(Bosnia and Herzegovina) Zvjezdan Misimović
LW	21	(China) Yu Hai
RW	27	(China) Qu Bo	(yellow card) 22'
CF	9	(Bosnia and Herzegovina) Zlatan Muslimović		(substituted off) 86'
Substitutes:
GK	22	(China) Sheng Peng
DF	5	(China) Wu Wei		(substituted on) 64'
DF	19	(China) Liu Tianqi
DF	35	(China) Wan Houliang
MF	6	(China) Fan Yunlong
MF	8	(China) Li Chunyu		(substituted on) 76'
FW	11	(Spain) Rafa Jordà		(substituted on) 86'
Coach:
(China) Gong Lei

Assistant referees:
Huo Weiming
Liu Guiqing
Fourth official:
Ma Ning

== Awards ==
- Top Scorer: (Nigeria) Peter Utaka (Beijing Guoan) (4 goals)
- Most Valuable Player: (Argentina) Darío Conca (Guangzhou Evergrande)
- Fair Play Award: Guizhou Moutai
- Best Coach: (China) Gong Lei (Guizhou Moutai)

== Goalscorers ==
4 goals

- (Nigeria) Peter Utaka (Beijing Guoan)

3 goals

- (Ecuador) Joffre Guerrón (Beijing Guoan)
- (France) Guillaume Hoarau (Dalian Aerbin)
- (Argentina) Darío Conca (Guangzhou Evergrande)
- (Bosnia and Herzegovina) Zlatan Muslimović (Guizhou Moutai)
- (China) Yu Hai (Guizhou Moutai)
- (Japan) Masashi Oguro (Hangzhou Greentown)
- (Argentina) Pablo Brandán (Liaoning Whowin)
- (Brazil) Edu (Liaoning Whowin)

2 goals

- (China) Wang Xiaolong (Beijing Guoan)
- (China) Ma Xiaolei (Chongqing FC)
- (China) Wang Weicheng (Chongqing Lifan)
- (China) Zhang Chiming (Chongqing Lifan)
- (China) Cui Ri (Dali Ruilong)
- (China) Ma Sai (Dali Ruilong)
- (China) Feng Junyan (Guangzhou Evergrande)
- (Brazil) Muriqui (Guangzhou Evergrande)
- (China) Ni Bo (Guangzhou Evergrande)
- (China) Peng Xinli (Guangzhou Evergrande)
- (Brazil) Davi (Guangzhou R&F)
- (China) Lu Lin (Guangzhou R&F)
- (Bosnia and Herzegovina) Zvjezdan Misimović (Guizhou Moutai)
- (China) Li Jiahe (Harbin Yiteng)
- (China) Liu Xinyu (Hunan Billows)
- (Serbia) Aleksandar Jevtić (Jiangsu Sainty)
- (China) Liu Bin (Qingdao Kunpeng)
- (China) Shi Jun (Qinghai Senke)
- (China) Zheng Lei (Shaanxi Laochenggen)
- (China) Yu Le (Shenzhen Ruby)
- (China) Rong Yu (Tianjin Songjiang)

1 goal

- (China) Wang Xin (Dalian Longjuanfeng)
- (China) Xie Wenkai (Beijing BIT)
- (China) Shao Jiayi (Beijing Guoan)
- (China) Wang Hao (Beijing Guoan)
- (China) Xu Yunlong (Beijing Guoan)
- (China) Zhang Xizhe (Beijing Guoan)
- (China) Liu Weidong (Changchun Yatai)
- (China) Zhai Zhaoyu (Chongqing FC)
- (Australia) Brendon Šantalab (Chongqing Lifan)
- (China) Xu Xiaobo (Chongqing Lifan)
- (China) Tian Yong (Dali Ruilong)
- (China) Wang Peng (Dali Ruilong)
- (China) Yang Zengqi (Dali Ruilong)
- (China) Zheng Wangyang (Dali Ruilong)
- (China) Dong Xuesheng(Dalian Aerbin)
- (Australia) Daniel Mullen (Dalian Aerbin)
- (China) Sun Bo (Dalian Aerbin)
- (China) Yu Dabao (Dalian Aerbin)
- (Brazil) Dorielton (Guangdong Sunray Cave)
- (China) Yang Bin (Guangdong Sunray Cave)
- (China) Zhang Yong (Guangdong Sunray Cave)
- (Brazil) Elkeson (Guangzhou Evergrande)
- (China) Gao Lin (Guangzhou Evergrande)
- (China) Huang Bowen (Guangzhou Evergrande)
- (China) Shewket Yalqun (Guangzhou Evergrande)
- (China) Yang Chaosheng (Guangzhou Evergrande)
- (China) Zhang Linpeng (Guangzhou Evergrande)
- (China) Zhao Peng (Guangzhou Evergrande)
- (China) Zhang Shuo (Guangzhou R&F)
- (Spain) Nano (Guizhou Moutai)
- (China) Yan Xiangchuang (Guizhou Moutai)
- (China) Yang Yihu (Guizhou Moutai)
- (China) Qu Bo (Guizhou Moutai)
- (China) Gu Zhongqing (Guizhou Zhicheng)
- (China) Cao Xuan (Hangzhou Greentown)
- (China) Liu Xiaolong (Harbin Yiteng)
- (Brazil) Rodrigo (Harbin Yiteng)
- (Colombia) Ricardo Steer (Harbin Yiteng)
- (China) Zhang Gen (Hebei Zhongji)
- (China) Zhang Lifeng (Hebei Zhongji)
- (China) Huang Xiyang (Henan Jianye)
- (China) Huang Zhun (Hohhot Dongjin)
- (China) Jiang Xiaoyu (Hohhot Dongjin)
- (China) Le Beisi (Hohhot Dongjin)
- (China) Mu Yongjie (Hohhot Dongjin)
- (China) Zhu Dayi (Hohhot Dongjin)
- (China) Liu Qing (Hunan Billows)
- (China) Liu Jianye (Jiangsu Sainty)
- (Albania) Hamdi Salihi (Jiangsu Sainty)
- (China) Wu Xi (Jiangsu Sainty)
- (China) Feng Tao (Jiaozhou Fengfa)
- (China) Chen Quanjun (Meixian Hakka)
- (Argentina) Pablo Caballero (Qingdao Jonoon)
- (Uzbekistan) Sherzod Karimov (Qingdao Jonoon)
- (China) Song Bo (Qingdao Jonoon)
- (China) Song Wenjie (Qingdao Jonoon)
- (China) Xu Jingjie (Qingdao Jonoon)
- (China) Zhu Shiyu (Qingdao Jonoon)
- (China) Liu Cheng (Qinghai Senke)
- (China) Shan Xialu (Qinghai Senke)
- (China) Zhang Yu (Qinghai Senke)
- (China) Liu Yang (Shaanxi Laochenggen)
- (China) Shen Tianfeng (Shaanxi Laochenggen)
- (China) Wang Si (Shaanxi Laochenggen)
- (China) Yang Jingxuan (Shaanxi Laochenggen)
- (China) Yang Lei (Shaanxi Laochenggen)
- (Romania) Marius Niculae (Shandong Luneng Taishan)
- (Argentina) Leonardo Pisculichi (Shandong Luneng Taishan)
- (China) Wang Gang (Shandong Luneng Taishan)
- (China) Lin Chuangyi (Shanghai East Asia)
- (China) Mao Jiakang (Shanghai East Asia)
- (China) Cao Yunding (Shanghai Shenhua)
- (China) Wang Changqing (Shanghai Shenhua)
- (Brazil) Jaílton Paraíba (Shanghai Shenxin)
- (China) Zhao Zuojun (Shanghai Shenxin)
- (China) Guan Hongyu (Shenyang Riverside Garden)
- (China) Nan Yunqi (Shenyang Shenbei)
- (China) Tang Miao (Shenzhen Fengpeng)
- (China) Zhang Hongbin (Shenzhen Fengpeng)
- (Senegal) Babacar Gueye (Shenzhen Ruby)
- (China) Ling Sihao (Shenzhen Ruby)
- (China) Ge Yuxiang (Shijiazhuang Yongchang Junhao)
- (China) Yang Lin (Shijiazhuang Yongchang Junhao)
- (China) Chen Bin (Suzhou Jinfu)
- (Brazil) Dinélson (Tianjin Teda)
- (Serbia) Vladimir Jovančić (Tianjin Teda)
- (China) Ma Xiao (Tongji University)
- (China) Wang Zhewei (Tongji University)
- (China) Chen Hao (Wuhan Hongxing)
- (China) Deng Sheng (Wuhan Hongxing)
- (China) Huang Lei (Wuhan Hongxing)
- (China) Zhang Weijun (Wuhan Hongxing)
- (China) Zhang Xiaoxiao (Wuhan Hongxing)
- (China) Ehme (Xinjiang Youth)
- (China) Elijan (Xinjiang Youth)
- (China) Esqerjan (Xinjiang Youth)

Own goals

- Scored for Hangzhou Greentown (1): (China) Zhang Xian (Wuhan Hongxing)
- Scored for Qingdao Jonoon (1): (China) Yang Yun (Beijing Guoan)
