= 2012 Qingdao Jonoon F.C. season =

Qingdao Jonoon F.C.
- Chairman: Qiao Weiguang
- Super League: –
- FA Cup: –
Home colours	Away colours

The 2012 Qingdao Jonoon F.C. season is Qingdao's 16th consecutive season in the top division of Chinese football. Qingdao will also be competing in the Chinese FA Cup.

== Players ==
As of 5 March 2012

=== First team ===
Note: Flags indicate national team as defined under FIFA eligibility rules; some limited exceptions apply. Players may hold more than one non-FIFA nationality.

No.	Pos.	Nation	Player
1	GK	CHN	Liu Jun
2	MF	CHN	Guo Liang
3	DF	BRA	Léo San
5	MF	CHN	Xu Jingjie
6	MF	UZB	Aziz Ibrahimov
7	MF	CHN	Yao Jiangshan
8	FW	CHN	Song Bo
10	MF	CHN	Zheng Long (vice captain)
11	FW	CRO	Krunoslav Lovrek
12	MF	CHN	Pan Yuchen
13	DF	CHN	Li Zhuangfei
14	DF	CHN	Wei Renjie
15	FW	CHN	Zhu Jianrong
16	MF	CHN	Feng Tao
17	DF	CHN	Liu Jian (Captain)
18	MF	CHN	Xing Dong

No.	Pos.	Nation	Player
19	DF	CHN	Song Wenjie
20	DF	CHN	Li Linfeng
21	FW	CHN	Lu Yi
22	GK	CHN	Liu Zhenli
23	MF	CHN	Song Long
24	DF	NGR	Gabriel Melkam
25	MF	CHN	Zou Zheng
26	DF	CHN	Sun Jiangshan
27	DF	CHN	Liu Yangyang
28	GK	CHN	Mou Pengfei
29	MF	CHN	Zhu Shiyu
30	DF	CHN	Yi Guangjun
32	DF	CHN	Li Peng
33	DF	CHN	Sha Yibo
34	MF	CHN	Pang Zhiquan
35	DF	CHN	Gong Yaotong

=== Reserve squad ===
Note: Flags indicate national team as defined under FIFA eligibility rules; some limited exceptions apply. Players may hold more than one non-FIFA nationality.

No.	Pos.	Nation	Player
41	GK	CHN	Sun Pinghai
42	DF	CHN	Zhao Yuan
43	DF	CHN	Xu Feng
44	MF	CHN	Xue Kaiwen
46	DF	CHN	Zhang Runhao
47	FW	CHN	Xu Meng
49	DF	CHN	Ye Qian

No.	Pos.	Nation	Player
50	DF	CHN	Song Zehao
51	MF	CHN	Man Yi
52	MF	CHN	Liu Yi
53	FW	CHN	Pu Xianlin
54	MF	CHN	Jie Lei
55	FW	CHN	Yuan Ruike
56	MF	CHN	Li Yu

=== On loan ===
Note: Flags indicate national team as defined under FIFA eligibility rules; some limited exceptions apply. Players may hold more than one non-FIFA nationality.

No.	Pos.	Nation	Player
45	MF	CHN	Wang Peng (at Sichuan FC until 31 December 2012)
48	DF	CHN	Liu Haonan (at Shandong Youth until 31 December 2012)
57	DF	CHN	Yan Tengfei (at Sichuan FC until 31 December 2012)

== Competitions ==
=== Chinese Super League ===
==== League table ====
Pos	Team	Pld	W	D	L	GF	GA	GD	Pts	Qualification or relegation
11	Hangzhou Greentown	30	9	9	12	34	46	−12	36 (Note: Liaoning, 10pts; Hangzhou, 9pts; Shandong, 6pts, GF=4, GA=5; Qingdao, 6pts, GF=4, GA=5)	
12	Shandong Luneng	30	8	12	10	46	43	+3	36	
13	Qingdao Jonoon	30	10	6	14	26	34	−8	36	
14	Dalian Shide (D, R)	30	8	10	12	39	49	−10	34	Disbanded after season (Note: On 30 November 2012, Dalian Shide were acquisited by Aerbin Group and merged into Dalian Aerbin after their owner was arrested.)
15	Shanghai Shenxin	30	6	12	12	36	35	+1	30	

Source: Chinese Super League (in Chinese)
Rules for classification: 1) points; 2) goal difference; 3) number of goals scored; 4) head-to-head goals scored; 5) goal difference; 6) goals scored; 7) disciplinary points (1 point for each yellow card, 3 points for each red card). Head-to-Head: Only used at the end of the season when two or more teams need the head-to-head rules to break a tie.
(D) Disqualified; (R) Relegated

==== Matches ====
11 March 2012 Week 1	Hangzhou Greentown	0–0	Qingdao Jonoon	Yellow Dragon Sports Center
Sunday 15:30		Report	Melkam (yellow card) 23'; Léo San (yellow card) 32'; Li Peng (yellow card) 39'	Attendance: 19,623; Referee: Wang Zhe

16 March 2012 Week 2	Qingdao Jonoon	2–1	Tianjin Teda	Qingdao Tiantai Stadium
Friday 19:35	Zhu Jianrong 4'; Liu Jian 85'; Guo Liang (yellow card) 36'; Li Peng (yellow card) 45'; Li Zhuangfei (yellow card) 64'	Report	81' Sodje; Veliče Šumulikoski (yellow card) 70'	Attendance: 8,225; Referee: Fan Qi

24 March 2012 Week 3	Dalian Shide	2–1	Qingdao Jonoon	Jinzhou Stadium
14:30	Kamburov 45' (pen.) (yellow card) 47' (goal) 87'; Ricardo Esteves (yellow card) 65'	Summary	Zheng Long 25'; Li Peng (yellow card) 53'	Attendance: 5,713; Referee: Hai Tan

30 March 2012 Week 4	Qingdao Jonoon	0–1	Shandong Luneng	Qingdao Tiantai Stadium
20:35	Melkam (yellow card) 33'; Wei Renjie (yellow card) 40'; Zhu Shiyu (yellow card) 42'; Léo San (yellow card) 47'	Report	Hao Junmin 4'; Wang Qiang (yellow card) 8'	Attendance: 12,136; Referee: Wang Di

7 April 2012 Week 5	Liaoning Whowin	2–0	Qingdao Jonoon	Tiexi New District Sports Center
15:30	Yang Xu 10', 27' (yellow card) 56'; Zhang Ye (yellow card) 81'; Wang Liang (yellow card) 87'	Report	Zhu Jianrong (yellow card) 54'	Attendance: 16,407; Referee: Wang Zhe

15 April 2012 Week 6	Qingdao Jonoon	2–1	Shanghai Shenxin	Qingdao Tiantai Stadium
20:35	Liu Jian 58' (pen.) 81'; Melkam (yellow card) 77'; Zheng Long (red card) 86'	Report	Anselmo 5'; Zhu Baojie (yellow card) 15'; Liu Dianzuo (yellow card) 55'; Ye Chongqiu (yellow card) 70'; Salley (yellow card) 80'; Antônio Flávio (red card) 86'	Attendance: 6,122; Referee: Ai Kun

21 April 2012 Week 7	Henan Construction	1–0	Qingdao Jonoon	Zhengzhou Hanghai Stadium
19:30	Leandro Netto 66'; Enis Hajri (yellow card) 90'	Report	Yao Jiangshan (yellow card) 22'; Melkam (yellow card) 90'	Attendance: 18,699; Referee: Fu Ming

29 April 2012 Week 8	Qingdao Jonoon	0–1	Guizhou Renhe	Qingdao Tiantai Stadium
15:30	Zou Zheng (yellow card) 38'; Liu Jian (yellow card) 69'; Yin Guangjun (yellow card) 77'	Report	Zlatan Muslimović 45+1'; Dong Yang (yellow card) 73'	Attendance: 6,098; Referee: Zhou Gang

5 May 2012 Week 9	Changchun Yatai	0–0	Qingdao Jonoon	Development Area Stadium
19:30	Anzur Ismailov (yellow card) 78'	Report		Attendance: 10,318; Referee: Tao Rancheng

13 May 2012 Week 10	Qingdao Jonoon	1–3	Dalian Aerbin	Qingdao Tiantai Stadium
15:30	Liu Jian 7'; Zheng Long (yellow card) 17'; Melkam (yellow card) 81'	Report	Peter Utaka 43' 85'; Yu Dabao 49'; Mile Sterjovski (yellow card) 27'; Yin Lu (yellow card) 65'	Attendance: 7,216; Referee: Ma Li

20 May 2012 Week 11	Guangzhou Evergrande	1–0	Qingdao Jonoon	Tianhe Stadium
19:35	Gao Lin 68'; Feng Junyang (yellow card) 75'	Report	Song Long (yellow card) 38'; Melkam (yellow card) 62'; Guo Liang (yellow card) 67'	Attendance: 38,612; Referee: Li Jun

27 May 2012 Week 12	Jiangsu Sainty	1–0	Qingdao Jonoon	Nanjing Olympic Sports Center
19:40	Aleksandar Jevtić 77'; Liu Jianye (yellow card) 47'; Eleílson (yellow card) 86'	Report	Liu Zhenli (yellow card) 60'	Attendance: 24,796; Referee: Zhou Gang

16 June 2012 Week 13	Beijing Guoan	0–0	Qingdao Jonoon	Workers Stadium
19:30	Xu Liang (yellow card) 56'	Report	Li Peng (yellow card) 7' (yellow-red card) 47'; Liu Jian (yellow card) 43'; Yao Jiangshan (yellow card) 51'; Guo Liang (yellow card) 90'	Attendance: 37,769; Referee: Shi Zhenlu

23 June 2012 Week 14	Guangzhou R&F	2–3	Qingdao Jonoon	Yuexiushan Stadium
19:30	Tang Miao 6'; Rafael Coelho 45+4'	Report	Aziz Ibrahimov 9'; Léo San 15'; Zhu Jianrong 59'	Attendance: 4,344; Referee: Tao Rancheng

1 July 2012 Week 15	Qingdao Jonoon	1–0	Shanghai Shenhua	Qingdao Tiantai Stadium
15:30	Zhu Jianrong 40'; Zhu Shiyu (yellow card) 25'; Zou Zheng (yellow card) 33'; Yao Jiangshan (yellow card) 79'	Report	Jiang Kun (yellow card) 71'	Attendance: 15，195; Referee: Fu Ming

8 July 2012 Week 16	Qingdao Jonoon	0–0	Hangzhou Greentown	Qingdao Tiantai Stadium
15:30		Report		Attendance: 8079; Referee: Wang Zhe

14 July 2012 Week 17	Tianjin Teda	0–0	Qingdao Jonoon	TEDA Football Stadium
20:30	He Yang (yellow card) 72'	Report	Guo Liang (yellow card) 58'; Mou Pengfei (yellow card) 82'	Attendance: 17,368; Referee: Xu Fuxin

22 July 2012 Week 18	Qingdao Jonoon	1–2	Dalian Shide	Qingdao Tiantai Stadium
16:30	Bruno Meneghel 48'; Melkam (yellow card) 63'	Report	Yan Xiangchuang 35' (yellow card) 81'; Chamanga 77'; Yan Feng (yellow card) 90'

28 July 2012 Week 19	Shandong Luneng Taishan	1–1	Qingdao Jonoon	Shandong Provincial Stadium
20:30	Wang Yongpo 30'; Wang Tong (yellow card) 61'; Gilberto Macena (yellow card) 90'	Summary	Bruno Meneghel 48'; Li Peng (yellow card) 59'; Mou Pengfei (yellow card) 88'; Zhu Jianrong (yellow card) 90'	Attendance: 16,158; Referee: (Japan) Hiroyuki Kimura

4 August 2012 Week 20	Qingdao Jonoon	3–1	Liaoning Whowin	Qingdao Tiantai Stadium
16:30	Bruno Meneghel 37', 57'; Zhu Shiyu 43'; Zou Zheng (yellow card) 90'	Summary	Wang Bo 53'	Attendance: 6,126; Referee: (China) Fu Ming

11 August 2012 Week 21	Shanghai Shenxin	2–0	Qingdao Jonoon	Jinshan Sports Centre
20:45	Anselmo 24'; Jaílton Paraíba 55'	Report	Zou Zheng (yellow card) 47'; Song Bo (yellow card) 84'; Yao Jiangshan (yellow card) 90'	Attendance: 12,693; Referee: (China) Wang Zhe

19 August 2012 Week 22	Qingdao Jonoon	3–1	Henan Jianye	Qingdao Tiantai Stadium
16:30	Melkam (yellow card) 18'; Zou Zheng 27'; Bruno Meneghel 78', 90+3'	Summary	Son Seung-Joon (yellow card) 5'; Zhao Peng (yellow card) 25'; Chansa 44'; Xiao Zhi (yellow card) 46'; Adaílton (yellow card) 46'; Tan Wangsong (yellow card) 48'; He Bin (red card) 87'	Attendance: 8,673; Referee: (Thailand) Chaiya Mahapab

25 August 2012 Week 23	Guizhou Renhe	1–0	Qingdao Jonoon	Guiyang Olympic Sports Center
16:30	Muslimović 64'; Chen Jie (yellow card) 68'; Djulbic (yellow card) 76'; Yang Hao (yellow card) 90+1'	Summary	Li Peng (yellow card) 39'	Attendance: 20,041; Referee: (China) Hai Tan

22 September 2012 Week 24	Dalian Aerbin	2–1	Qingdao Jonoon	Jinzhou Stadium
20:00	Keita 34', 55'; Zhu Xiaogang (yellow card) 49'; Liu Weiguo (yellow card) 63'; Wang Jun (yellow card) 83'	Summary	Léo San (yellow card) 37'; Bruno Meneghel 85'

28 September 2012 Week 25	Qingdao Jonoon	–	Guangzhou Evergrande	Qingdao Tiantai Stadium
20:35

3 October 2012 Week 26	Qingdao Jonoon	–	Changchun Yatai	Qingdao Tiantai Stadium
20:35

6 October 2012 Week 27	Qingdao Jonoon	–	Jiangsu Sainty	Qingdao Tiantai Stadium
16:30

20 October 2012 Week 28	Qingdao Jonoon	–	Beijing Guoan	Qingdao Tiantai Stadium
16:30

27 October 2012 Week 29	Qingdao Jonoon	–	Guangzhou R&F	Qingdao Tiantai Stadium
16:30

3 November 2012 Week 30	Shanghai Shenhua	–	Qingdao Jonoon	Hongkou Football Stadium
15:30

=== Chinese FA Cup ===
27 June 2012 Round 3	Qingdao Jonoon	4–0	Guizhou Zhicheng	Qingdao Tiantai Stadium
Wednesday 15:30	Sha Yibo 42' 78'; Song Wenjie 48'; Pang Zhiquan 90+4'			Attendance: 2620

18 July 2012 Round 4	Beijing Guoan	6–0	Qingdao Jonoon	Workers Stadium
Wednesday 20:30	Kanouté 4', 36'; Wang Xiaolong 15', 22' (pen.); Guerrón 19'; Liu Yangyang 64' (o.g.)	Report	Wei Renjie (red card) 89'
