= 2012 Guizhou Renhe F.C. season =

Guizhou Renhe 2012
- Chairman: Wang Guolin
- Manager: Gao Hongbo
- Super League: 4th
- FA Cup: in progress
- Top goalscorer: League: Zlatan Muslimović (12); All: Zlatan Muslimović; Rafa Jordà (13)
- Highest home attendance: 52,888 vs Guangzhou Evergrande; 4 August 2012
- Lowest home attendance: 20,041 vs Qingdao Jonoon; 25 August 2012
- Average home league attendance: 29,574
Home colours	Away colours

The 2012 Guizhou Renhe season is Guizhou Renhe's 11th consecutive season in the top division of Chinese football. They also competed in the Chinese FA Cup that year, making it to the final of that competition.

== Players ==
=== First team squad ===
As of 30 October 2012

Note: Flags indicate national team as defined under FIFA eligibility rules; some limited exceptions apply. Players may hold more than one non-FIFA nationality.

No.	Pos.	Nation	Player
1	GK	CHN	Shen Jun
2	DF	CHN	Wu Wei
3	DF	CHN	Zhang Chenglin
6	DF	AUS	Dino Djulbic
7	DF	ESP	Nano
9	FW	BIH	Zlatan Muslimović
10	MF	ESP	Rubén Suárez
11	FW	ESP	Rafa Jordà
12	GK	CHN	Zhang Lie
14	FW	CHN	Yang Yihu
15	MF	CHN	Chen Jie
16	DF	CHN	Lu Qiang
17	DF	CHN	Sun Jihai
18	FW	CHN	Shen Tianfeng

No.	Pos.	Nation	Player
19	DF	CHN	Liu Tianqi
21	MF	CHN	Yu Hai
22	GK	CHN	Sheng Pengfei
23	GK	CHN	Xu Jiamin
24	MF	CHN	Yang Lei
25	DF	CHN	Li Kai
27	FW	CHN	Qu Bo (captain)
28	DF	CHN	Dong Yang
29	MF	CHN	Yang Hao
30	DF	CHN	Liu Qing
31	MF	CHN	Rao Weihui
32	DF	CHN	Gao Zhenzhe
33	MF	CHN	Guo Sheng

=== Reserve squad ===
Note: Flags indicate national team as defined under FIFA eligibility rules; some limited exceptions apply. Players may hold more than one non-FIFA nationality.

No.	Pos.	Nation	Player
35	DF	CHN	Shi Juwei
36	MF	CHN	Luo Andong
37	FW	CHN	Tan Liwei

No.	Pos.	Nation	Player
41	DF	CHN	Lei Ludekun
42	DF	CHN	Xiang Hantian
43	DF	CHN	Hu Hao
44	FW	CHN	Xu Liao

=== On loan ===
Note: Flags indicate national team as defined under FIFA eligibility rules; some limited exceptions apply. Players may hold more than one non-FIFA nationality.

No.	Pos.	Nation	Player
13	MF	CHN	Wang Erzhuo (at Shaanxi Laochenggen until 31 December 2012)
26	MF	CHN	Liao Linkun (at Shaanxi Laochenggen until 31 December 2012)
38	FW	CHN	Zhang Chengxiang (at Shaanxi Laochenggen until 31 December 2012)

== Transfers ==
=== Winter ===
In:

No.	Pos.	Nation	Player
2	DF	CHN	Wu Wei (from Hangzhou Greentown)
7	DF	ESP	Nano (from Levante UD)
9	FW	BIH	Zlatan Muslimović (free agent)
11	FW	ESP	Rafa Jordà (from Levante UD)
14	FW	CHN	Yang Yihu (from Guangzhou Evergrande)
16	DF	CHN	Lu Qiang (from Dalian Shide)
19	DF	CHN	Liu Tianqi (loan return from Dalian Aerbin)
20	MF	ARG	Gustavo Rodas (from Deportivo Quito)
28	DF	CHN	Dong Yang (from Beijing Baxy)
29	MF	CHN	Yang Hao (from Guangzhou Evergrande)
-	FW	CHN	Mao Jianqing (loan return from Hangzhou Greentown)
-	FW	CHN	Chen Zijie (loan return from Shanghai East Asia)
-	DF	CHN	Cao Huan (loan return from Hunan Billows)
-	MF	CHN	Du Fa (loan return from Chongqing F.C.)

Out:

No.	Pos.	Nation	Player
2	DF	SRB	Miloš Bajalica (to Kyoto Sanga F.C.)
4	MF	ITA	Fabio Firmani (released)
7	MF	CHN	Zhao Xuri (to Guangzhou Evergrande)
10	FW	BRA	Wilson (to Vegalta Sendai)
11	FW	SCO	Derek Riordan (to St Johnstone)
14	DF	CHN	Li Chenguang (to Hubei China-Kyle)
19	MF	CHN	Xu Qing (to Chongqing F.C.)
20	MF	CHN	Zhu Jiawei (to Nanchang Hengyuan)
28	DF	CHN	Han Weichen (released)
29	MF	CHN	Zhang Ke (to Henan Construction)
33	FW	CHN	Mao Jianqing (to Beijing Guoan)
36	MF	CHN	Xu Xiang (to Shaanxi Laochenggen)
37	DF	CHN	Zheng Bo (to Shaanxi Laochenggen)
38	DF	CHN	Liu Shiyu (to Shaanxi Laochenggen)
39	DF	CHN	Jing Guodong (to Shaanxi Laochenggen)
-	DF	CHN	Cao Huan (to Hunan Billows)
-	FW	CHN	Chen Zijie (loan to Shanghai East Asia)
-	MF	CHN	Du Fa (to Wuhan Zall)

=== Summer ===
In:

No.	Pos.	Nation	Player
10	MF	ESP	Rubén Suárez (from Levante)

Out:

No.	Pos.	Nation	Player
13	MF	CHN	Wang Erzhuo (loan to Shaanxi Laochenggen)
20	MF	ARG	Gustavo Rodas (to León de Huánuco)
26	MF	CHN	Liao Linkun (loan to Shaanxi Laochenggen)
38	FW	CHN	Zhang Chengxiang (loan to Shaanxi Laochenggen)

== Competitions ==
=== Chinese Super League ===
==== League table ====
Pos	Team	Pld	W	D	L	GF	GA	GD	Pts	Qualification or relegation
2	Jiangsu Sainty	30	14	12	4	49	29	+20	54	2013 AFC Champions League group stage (Note: Guizhou Moutai qualified for the 2013 AFC Champions League because league champions Guangzhou Evergrande also won the 2012 Chinese FA Cup.)
3	Beijing Guoan	30	14	6	10	34	35	−1	48	2013 AFC Champions League group stage
4	Guizhou Moutai	30	12	9	9	44	33	+11	45	2013 AFC Champions League group stage
5	Dalian Aerbin	30	11	11	8	51	46	+5	44 (Note: Dalian 1–2 Changchun; Changchun 1–2 Dalian)	
6	Changchun Yatai	30	12	8	10	37	40	−3	44	

Source: Chinese Super League (in Chinese)
Rules for classification: 1) points; 2) goal difference; 3) number of goals scored; 4) head-to-head goals scored; 5) goal difference; 6) goals scored; 7) disciplinary points (1 point for each yellow card, 3 points for each red card). Head-to-Head: Only used at the end of the season when two or more teams need the head-to-head rules to break a tie.

==== Matches ====
10 March 2012 Round 1	Guizhou Renhe	2–1	Shandong Luneng	Guiyang Olympic Centre
19:40	Djulbic (yellow card) 41'; Zhang Chenglin (yellow card) 54'; Djulbic 56'; Zhang Chenglin (yellow card) 54' (yellow-red card) 90+2'; Jordà 90+3'	Report	31' Antar; (yellow card) 52' Xia Ningning	Attendance: 51,983; Referee: Tan Hai

17 March 2012 Round 2	Guizhou Renhe	1–1	Liaoning Whowin	Guiyang Olympic Sports Center
	Yu Hai 6'; Rafa Jordà (yellow card) 37'	Report	Kim Yoo-Jin 45'; Zheng Tao (yellow card) 33'; Yu Hanchao (yellow card) 55'; Pablo Brandán (yellow card) 79'	Attendance: 33,220; Referee: Zhou Gang

24 March 2012 Round 3	Shanghai Shenxin	0–0	Guizhou Renhe	Jinshan Sports Centre
	Antônio Flávio (yellow card) 30'; Ye Chongqiu (yellow card) 65'; Wang Yun (yellow card) 72'	Report	Li Chunyu (yellow card) 27'; Yu Hai (yellow card) 39'; Nano (yellow card) 46'; Dino Djulbic (yellow card) 90'

2 April 2012 Round 4	Guizhou Renhe	1–2	Henan Jianye	Guiyang Olympic Sports Center
16:30	Rafa Jordà 11'; Sun Jihai (yellow card) 34'	Report	Katongo 69', 82'; Hajri (yellow card) 80'	Attendance: 42,241; Referee: Zhang Zhengping

8 April 2012 Round 5	Guangzhou Evergrande	1–1	Guizhou Renhe	Tianhe Stadium
20:35	Conca 44' (pen.); Muriqui (yellow card) 52'; Feng Xiaoting (yellow card) 69'; Li Jianhua (yellow card) 86'	Report		Attendance: 42,241; Referee: Zhang Zhengping

14 April 2012 Round 6	Changchun Yatai	0–0	Guizhou Renhe	Development Area Stadium
16:30	Pei Shuai (yellow card) 38' (yellow-red card) 58'; Zhang Xiaofei (yellow card) 55'	Report	Rodas (yellow card) 9'; Li Chunyu (yellow card) 34'; Muslimović (yellow card) 62'; Chen Jie (yellow card) 78'	Attendance: 15,853; Referee: Ma Ning

22 April 2012 Round 7	Guizhou Renhe	2–2	Dalian Aerbin	Guiyang Olympic Sports Center
16:30	Zhang Chenglin 11'; Muslimović 31'; Zhang Lie (yellow card) 40'; Sun Jihai (red card) 76'; Chen Jie (yellow card) 85' (yellow-red card) 87'	Report	Zhou Tong (yellow card) 13'; Wang Hongyou (yellow card) 15'; Addy (yellow card) 19'; Fábio Rochemback 49' (yellow card) 52'; Jin Pengxiang (yellow card) 80' (yellow-red card) 89'; Utaka 90+4'	Attendance: 21,060; Referee: Tang Kun

29 April 2012 Round 8	Qingdao Jonoon	0–1	Guizhou Renhe	Qingdao Tiantai Stadium
16:30	Zou Zheng (yellow card) 38'; Liu Jian (yellow card) 69'; Yi Guangjun (yellow card) 77'	Report	Muslimović 45+1'; Dong Yang (yellow card) 73'	Attendance: 6,098; Referee: Zhou Gang

5 May 2012 Round 9	Guizhou Renhe	3–1	Jiangsu Sainty	Guiyang Olympic Sports Center
16:30	Djulbic 5'; Yu Hai (yellow card) 52' (yellow-red card) 88'; Rafa Jordà 65'; Muslimović 70'; Dong Yang (yellow card) 81'	Report	Sun Ke (yellow card) 23'; Dănălache 36'; Liu Jianye (yellow card) 52'; Eleílson (yellow card) 59'	Attendance: 22,111; Referee: Guo Baolong

11 May 2012 Round 10	Beijing Guoan	2–1	Guizhou Renhe	Workers Stadium
20:35	Kaluđerović 71'; Piao Cheng (yellow card) 78' (goal) 83'	Report	Nano (yellow card) 15'; Muslimović 44'; Rafa Jordà (yellow card) 48'; Chen Jie (yellow card) 60'	Attendance: 35,986; Referee: Tao Rancheng

19 May 2012 Round 11	Guizhou Renhe	3–0	Guangzhou R&F	Guiyang Olympic Sports Center
20:30	Qu Bo 18' (pen.), 32'; Li Chunyu (yellow card) 37'; Muslimović 84' (yellow card) 84'	Report	Zhang Yuan (yellow card) 16'; Liu Cheng (yellow card) 22'; Jumar (yellow card) 32'; Gao Jiulong (yellow card) 63'	Attendance: 27,982; Referee: Ma Ning

27 May 2012 Round 12	Shanghai Shenhua	2–1	Guizhou Renhe	Hongkou Football Stadium
20:45	Manset 39'; Cao Yunding 67'; Qiu Tianyi (yellow card) 74'; Wang Dalei (yellow card) 90+1'	Report	Sun Jihai (yellow card) 31'; Liu Tianqi (yellow card) 47'; Qu Bo 49'; Yu Hai (yellow card) 50'; Muslimović (yellow card) 75'	Attendance: 9,326; Referee: Fan Qi

17 June 2012 Round 13	Guizhou Renhe	5–0	Hangzhou Greentown	Guiyang Olympic Sports Center
20:30	Qu Bo 20', 44'; Muslimović 64'; Li Chunyu (yellow card) 80'; Yang Yihu 80', 87'	Report	Feng Gang (yellow card) 59'	Attendance: 23,369; Referee: Zhao Zhizhi

23 June 2012 Round 14	Tianjin Teda	1–2	Guizhou Renhe	TEDA Football Stadium
20:30	Bai Yuefeng (yellow card) 15'; Ars 23' (pen.)	Report	Yu Hai 52'; Zhang Chenglin 75'	Attendance: 13,602; Referee: Zhang Zhengping

1 July 2012 Round 15	Guizhou Renhe	2–0	Dalian Shide	Guiyang Olympic Sports Center
20:30	Qu Bo 5'; Muslimović 77'	Report	Kamburov (yellow card) 20' (yellow-red card) 69'; Zhao Honglüe (yellow card) 39'	Attendance: 30,082; Referee: Xu Fuxin

7 July 2012 Round 16	Shandong Luneng Taishan	3–1	Guizhou Renhe	Shandong Provincial Stadium
20:30	Wang Yongpo 34'; Gilberto Macena 52'; Du Wei 70' (pen.)	Report	Liu Tianqi (yellow card) 56'; Rafa Jordà 90'	Attendance: 14,437; Referee: Fan Qi

14 July 2012 Round 17	Liaoning Whowin	1–1	Guizhou Renhe	Tiexi New District Sports Center
20:30	Yang Shanping 89'	Report	Liu Tianqi (yellow card) 2'; Muslimović 43'; Yu Hai (yellow card) 64'; Rubén Suárez (yellow card) 87'

22 July 2012 Round 18	Guizhou Renhe	3–1	Shanghai Shenxin	Guiyang Olympic Sports Center
16:30	Yang Hao (yellow card) 39' (goal) 51'; Yu Hai (red card) 74'; Chen Jie 83'; Rafa Jordà (yellow card) 84'; Muslimović 86' (yellow card) 86'	Report	Johnny 5' (yellow card) 5'; Xu Wen (yellow card) 43'; Wang Jiayu (yellow card) 55'; Jiang Zhipeng (yellow card) 68'; Li Lei (yellow card) 74'

28 July 2012 Round 19	Henan Jianye	3–1	Guizhou Renhe	Zhengzhou Hanghai Stadium
20:45	Leandro Netto 14', 60'; Zhao Peng 39'	Report	Zhang Chenglin (yellow card) 23'; Sun Jihai (yellow card) 30'; Rubén Suárez 90+2' (pen.)

4 August 2012 Round 20	Guizhou Renhe	2–1	Guangzhou Evergrande	Guiyang Olympic Sports Center
20:30	Muslimović 35'; Chen Jie 80'	Report	Tang Dechao (yellow card) 29'; Gao Lin 43'; Zheng Zhi (yellow card) 50'	Attendance: 52,888; Referee: Zhang Zhengping

10 August 2012 Round 21	Guizhou Renhe	0–0	Changchun Yatai	Guiyang Olympic Sports Center
20:30	Li Chunyu (yellow card) 46'	Report	Perea (yellow card) 11'; Pei Shuai (yellow card) 23'	Attendance: 20,114; Referee: Xu Hang

18 August 2012 Round 22	Dalian Aerbin	2–1	Guizhou Renhe	Jinzhou Stadium
20:00	Addy (yellow card) 28'; Keita 36'; Yu Dabao (yellow card) 51'; Utaka 90' (pen.); Liu Weiguo (yellow card) 90+4'	Summary	Li Chunyu (yellow card) 31'; Yang Hao (yellow card) 55'; Rafa Jordà 84' (yellow card) 90+5'; Muslimović (yellow card) 90+5'	Attendance: 13,797; Referee: Ma Ning

25 August 2012 Round 23	Guizhou Renhe	1–0	Qingdao Jonoon	Guiyang Olympic Sports Center
16:30	Muslimović 64'; Chen Jie (yellow card) 68'; Djulbic (yellow card) 76'; Yang Hao (yellow card) 90+1'	Summary	Li Peng (yellow card) 39'	Attendance: 20,041; Referee: Hai Tan

15 September 2012 Round 24	Jiangsu Sainty	2–0	Guizhou Renhe	Nanjing Olympic Sports Center
20:40	Jevtić (yellow card) 36' (goal) 62'; Jiang Jiajun (yellow card) 59'; Sun Ke (yellow card) 88'; Dănălache 90+2'	Summary	Yu Hai (yellow card) 36'; Nano (yellow card) 47'; Liu Tianqi (yellow card) 71'; Sun Jihai (yellow card) 90'	Attendance: 34,873; Referee: Tao Rancheng

23 September 2012 Round 25	Guizhou Renhe	0–2	Beijing Guoan	Guiyang Olympic Sports Center
16:30	Djulbic (yellow card) 50'; Yang Hao (yellow card) 69'; Muslimović (yellow card) 76'	Summary	Lang Zheng (yellow card) 27'; Matić (yellow card) 31'; Xu Liang 49'; Reinaldo (yellow card) 72' (goal) 74'	Attendance: 20,012; Referee: Tao Rancheng

30 September 2012 Round 26	Guangzhou R&F	1–0	Guizhou Renhe	Yuexiushan Stadium
18:45	Lu Lin (yellow card) 45'; Yakubu 80'	Summary	Li Chunyu (yellow card) 61'	Attendance: 5,530; Referee: Wang Zhe

6 October 2012 Round 27	Guizhou Renhe	4–2	Shanghai Shenhua	Guiyang Olympic Sports Center
16:30	Rafa Jordà 16'; Djulbic 38'; Zhang Chenglin (yellow card) 43' (goal) 57'; Shen Tianfeng 78'	Summary	Bo Jiajun (yellow card) 18'; Griffiths 63'; Drogba 89'

20 October 2012 Round 28	Hangzhou Greentown	1–1	Guizhou Renhe	Yellow Dragon Stadium
20:35	Mazola (yellow card) 29' (yellow-red card) 70'; Renatinho 40'		Liu Qing (yellow card) 14'; Dino Djulbic 37'	Attendance: 8,952; Referee: Wang Di

27 October 2012 Round 29	Guizhou Renhe	1–1	Tianjin Teda	Guiyang Olympic Sports Center
16:30	Dino Djulbic 24'; Liu Qing (yellow card) 48'; Liu Tianqi (yellow card) 78'		Du Zhenyu 38' (yellow card) 61' (yellow-red card) 90'; Bai Yuefeng (yellow card) 26'; Liu Bochao (yellow card) 32'

3 November 2012 Round 30	Dalian Shide	0–3	Guizhou Renhe	Jinzhou Stadium
15:30	Yang Boyu (yellow card) 7'; Zhao Mingjian (yellow card) 55'		Sun Jihai (yellow card) 34'; Dino Djulbic (yellow card) 48'; Chen Jie 66'; Yu Hai 72'; Rafa Jordà 90+3'

=== Chinese FA Cup ===
4 July 2012 Third round	Guizhou Renhe	2–0	Guangdong Sunray Cave	Guiyang
20:30	Jordà 43', 52'	Report		Stadium: Guiyang Olympic Sports Center

19 July 2012 Fourth round	Guizhou Renhe	2–0	Dalian Shide	Guiyang
16:30	Yu Hai 70'; Shen Tianfeng 89'			Stadium: Guiyang Olympic Sports Center; Referee: Zhong Jun

1 August 2012 Quarter-final	Beijing Guoan	3–4	Guizhou Renhe	Beijing
20:30	Xu Yunlong 13', 56'; Guerrón 92'		Zhang Chenglin 22'; Rafa Jordà 25'; Qu Bo 43'; Djulbic 83'	Stadium: Workers Stadium; Attendance: 28,668; Referee: Zhong Jun

22 August 2012 Semi-finals; First leg	Guizhou Renhe	1–1	Shandong Luneng Taishan	Guiyang
20:00	Rubén Suárez 1'		Wang Yongpo 57'	Stadium: Guiyang Olympic Sports Center; Attendance: 21,023; Referee: Prathan Nasa Wang

26 September 2012 Semi-finals; Second leg	Shandong Luneng Taishan	2–2	Guizhou Renhe	Jinan
20:00	Wang Yongpo 45'; Simão Mate Junior 62'		Muslimović 49'; Rafa Jordà 72'	Stadium: Shandong Provincial Stadium; Referee: Võ Minh Trí

10 November 2012 Final; First leg	Guizhou Moutai	1–1	Guangzhou Evergrande	Guiyang
19:30 UTC+8	Jordà 10'		Barrios 49'	Stadium: Guiyang Olympic Sports Center; Attendance: 45,210; Referee: Alan Milliner (Australia)

18 November 2012 Final; Second leg	Guangzhou Evergrande	4–2	Guizhou Moutai	Guangzhou
15:30 UTC+8	Barrios 1', 66'; Zhang Linpeng 44'; Conca 90+2'		Jordà 52'; Rao Weihui 90+4'	Stadium: Tianhe Stadium; Attendance: 39,989; Referee: Kim Sang-Woo (Korea Republic)
