= 2017 Jingjinji Champions Cup =

Tournament details
- Host country: China
- Dates: 1 September – 3 September
- Teams: 4 (from 1 association)
- Venue: 1 (in 1 host city)

Final positions
- Champions: Hebei China Fortune (2nd title)
- Runners-up: Tianjin Quanjian
- Third place: Tianjin Teda
- Fourth place: Beijing Sinobo Guoan

Tournament statistics
- Matches played: 4
- Goals scored: 19 (4.75 per match)
- Top scorer: (China) Song Wenjie (3 goals)
- Best player: (China) Dong Xuesheng

China Fortune 2017 Jingjinji Champions Cup - Beijing (Chinese: 华夏幸福2017京津冀冠军杯（北京站）) was the second edition of Jingjinji Champions Cup. The tournament was hosted by Beijing Sinobo Guoan in Beijing. Hebei China Fortune defended the title by beating invited team Tianjin Quanjian 7–0 in the final.

== Participating teams ==
- Beijing Sinobo Guoan (Host)
- Hebei China Fortune
- Tianjin Quanjian (Invited team)
- Tianjin Teda

== Competition format ==
The competition took the format of a regular knock-out competition. The winners of each of the two matches on the first day competed against each other for the Jingjinji Champions Cup, whilst the two losing sides played in a third-place match. If a match was level after normal time then a penalty shoot-out would be played to decide who advanced.

Semi-finals; 1 September
16:00
Beijing Sinobo Guoan	1
Tianjin Quanjian	3
19:30
Hebei China Fortune	2 (4)
Tianjin Teda	2 (2)

Final; 3 September
19:30
Tianjin Quanjian	0
Hebei China Fortune	7
Third place
16:00
Beijing Sinobo Guoan	1
Tianjin Teda	3

== Matches ==
All times are local (China Standard Time; UTC+8).

=== Semi-finals ===
1 September 2017	Beijing Sinobo Guoan	1–3	Tianjin Quanjian	Workers' Stadium, Beijing
16:00	Liu Sheng 69' (o.g.)	Report	Wang Xiaolong 35'; Modeste 36'; Sun Ke 71'	Referee: Wang Jing (Guizhou); Assistant referees: Li Xingfeng (Hebei), Li Yingbin (Hebei); Fourth official: Kou Jianxun (Dalian)

1 September 2017	Hebei China Fortune	2–2 (4–2 p)	Tianjin Teda	Workers' Stadium, Beijing
19:35	Mbia 67'; Dong Xuesheng 90+4'	Report	Acheampong 26', 88'	Referee: Tang Shunqi (Chengdu); Assistant referees: Jiang Bo (Liaoning), Zhang Yang (Tianjin); Fourth official: Ma Li (Beijing)
	Penalties
	Zhang Chengdong (penalty scored); Dong Xuesheng (penalty scored); Mbia (penalty missed); Ding Haifeng (penalty scored); Zhang Lifeng (penalty scored)		(penalty missed) Cao Yang; (penalty scored) Mirahmetjan; (penalty missed) Acheampong; (penalty scored) Zhao Yingjie

=== Third place play-off ===
3 September 2017	Beijing Sinobo Guoan	1–3	Tianjin Teda	Workers' Stadium, Beijing
16:00	Li Siqi 23'	Report	Diagne 8'; Wang Qiuming 44'; Wang Dong 52'	Referee: Kou Jianxun (Dalian); Assistant referees: Jiang Bo (Liaoning), Li Xingfeng (Hebei); Fourth official: Zhang Yang (Tianjin)

=== Final ===
3 September 2017	Tianjin Quanjian	0–7	Hebei China Fortune	Workers' Stadium, Beijing
19:35		Report	Li Haoran 7'; Luo Senwen 31'; Chen Tang 32'; Dong Xuesheng 50'; Song Wenjie 79', 82', 89'	Referee: Ma Li (Beijing); Assistant referees: Shao Honggeng (Beijing), Chen Jindong (Beijing); Fourth official: Li Yingbin (Hebei)
