= Jingjinji Champions Cup =

- Founded: 2016
- Region: China
- Teams: 4 (each year)
- Current champions: Hebei China Fortune (2nd title)
- Most championships: Hebei China Fortune (2 titles)
- 2017 Jingjinji Champions Cup

The Jingjinji Champions Cup (Chinese: 京津冀冠军杯) is a Chinese regional association football competition held since 2016. The tournament is originated by three clubs from Jingjinji area including Beijing Guoan (Jing), Tianjin Teda (Jin) and Hebei China Fortune (Ji), and hosted by the three clubs alternately. Henan Jianye was invited to the first edition of the tournament.

== Tournaments ==
Year	Host	Winner	Runners-Up	Third Place	Fourth Place
2016; Details	Qinhuangdao, Hebei	Hebei China Fortune	Henan Jianye	Tianjin Teda	Beijing Guoan
2017; Details	Beijing	Hebei China Fortune	Tianjin Quanjian	Tianjin Teda	Beijing Sinobo Guoan

== Awards ==
=== Most valuable players ===
Year	Player	Club
2016	(Sweden) Osman Sow	Henan Jianye
2017	(China) Dong Xuesheng	Hebei China Fortune

=== Top scorers ===
Year	Player	Club	Goals
2016	(China) Dong Xuesheng	Hebei China Fortune	2
2017	(China) Song Wenjie	Hebei China Fortune	3
