= Chen Tang =

Chen Tang may refer to:

- Chen Tang (general), Chinese military general of the Western Han dynasty
- Chen Tang (actor), Zhuang American actor
- Chen Tang (footballer), Chinese footballer

== See also ==
- Tang Chen, Hong Kong actress
