= 2016 Jingjinji Champions Cup =

Tournament details
- Host country: China
- Dates: 5 October – 8 October
- Teams: 4 (from 1 association)
- Venue: 1 (in 1 host city)

Final positions
- Champions: Hebei China Fortune (1st title)
- Runners-up: Henan Jianye
- Third place: Tianjin Teda
- Fourth place: Beijing Guoan

Tournament statistics
- Matches played: 4
- Goals scored: 9 (2.25 per match)
- Top scorer: (China) Dong Xuesheng
- Best player: (Sweden) Osman Sow

Kongquecheng 2016 Jingjinji Champions Cup - Hebei (Chinese: 孔雀城2016京津冀冠军杯（河北站）) was the first edition of Jingjinji Champions Cup. The tournament was hosted by Hebei China Fortune at Qinhuangdao city. Hebei China Fortune won the title and ¥1 million prize by beating invited team Henan Jianye in the penalty shoot-out.

== Participating teams ==
- Beijing Guoan
- Hebei China Fortune (Host)
- Henan Jianye (Invited team)
- Tianjin Teda

== Competition format ==
The competition took the format of a regular knock-out competition. The winners of each of the two matches on the first day competed against each other for the Jingjinji Champions Cup, whilst the two losing sides played in a third-place match.

Semi-finals; 5 October
15:30
Tianjin Teda	2 (4)
Henan Jianye	2 (5)
19:30
Hebei China Fortune	2
Beijing Guoan	0

Final; 8 October
19:30
Henan Jianye	1 (2)
Hebei China Fortune	1 (4)
Third place
15:30
Tianjin Teda	1
Beijing Guoan	0

== Matches ==
All times are local (China Standard Time; UTC+8).

=== Semi-finals ===
5 October 2016	Tianjin Teda	2–2 (4–5 p)	Henan Jianye	Qinhuangdao Olympic Sports Center Stadium, Qinhuangdao
15:30	Wang Qiuming 11'; Zhao Yingjie 26'		Sow 5'; Chen Hao 53'	Referee: Wang Zhe; Assistant referees: Li Yingbin, Zhao Wei; Fourth official: Tang Chao
	Penalties
	Diagne (penalty scored); Montero (penalty scored); Guo Yi (penalty missed); Jovanović (penalty scored); Guo Hao (penalty scored)		(penalty scored) Patiño; (penalty scored) Sow; (penalty scored) Gomes; (penalty scored) Zhong Jinbao; (penalty scored) Lu Yao

5 October 2016	Hebei China Fortune	2–0	Beijing Guoan	Qinhuangdao Olympic Sports Center Stadium, Qinhuangdao
19:30	Dong Xuesheng 55', 70'			Referee: Zhang Xiaochen; Assistant referees: Li Xingfeng, Tang Chao; Fourth official: Zhao Wei

=== Third place play-off ===
8 October 2016	Tianjin Teda	1–0	Beijing Guoan	Qinhuangdao Olympic Sports Center Stadium, Qinhuangdao
15:30	Zhang Yu 89' (o.g.)			Referee: Fu Ming; Assistant referees: Ma Teng, Yan Xu; Fourth official: Zhang Muqiusi

=== Final ===
8 October 2016	Hebei China Fortune	1–1 (4–2 p)	Henan Jianye	Qinhuangdao Olympic Sports Center Stadium, Qinhuangdao
19:30	Kakuta 43'		Patiño 28'	Referee: Qiu Zhaojun; Assistant referees: Li Xingfeng, Li Yingbin; Fourth official: Jia Jiazeng
	Penalties
	Kakuta (penalty scored); Aloísio (penalty missed); Mbia (penalty scored); Zhang Lifeng (penalty scored); Luo Senwen (penalty scored)		(penalty scored) Ivo; (penalty missed) Patiño; (penalty scored) Sow; (penalty missed) Gomes
