= Tang Miao =

Tang Miao may refer to:

- Tang Miao (footballer, born October 1990) (Chinese: 唐淼; pinyin: Táng Miǎo), Chinese soccer footballer from Liaoning, who plays for Guangzhou R&F F.C and China national team
- Tang Miao (footballer, born November 1990) (Chinese: 唐淼; pinyin: Táng Miǎo), Chinese soccer footballer from Anhui, who plays for Jiangsu Sainty F.C.

== See also ==
- Tang Miao or Tangmiao (Chinese: 唐庙镇; pinyin: Táng Miào Zhèn; lit. 'Tangmiao Town'), in Yuncheng County, Heze Prefecture, Shandong Province, China, see List of township-level divisions of Shandong
