= Liu Qing (footballer) =

Chinese footballer

Liu Qing 刘清
Personal information
- Full name: Liu Qing
- Date of birth: 5 April 1986 (age 40)
- Place of birth: Qingdao, China
- Height: 1.82 m (5 ft 11 1/2 in)
- Position: Defender

Youth career
- 1997–2004: Shandong Luneng

Senior career*
Years	Team	Apps	(Gls)
2003–2006	Shandong Luneng	0	(0)
2007–2008	Qingdao Jonoon	19	(0)
2009–2013	Guizhou Renhe	18	(0)
2013	→ Qingdao Hainiu (loan)	16	(0)
2014–2018	Qingdao Huanghai	69	(1)

Managerial career
- 2022: Zibo Qisheng
Medal record
Representing China
Men's football
AFC Youth Championship
Silver medal – second place	2004 َ Malaysia	Team
AFC U-17 Championship
Bronze medal – third place	2002 UAE	Team
- * Club domestic league appearances and goals as of 3 November 2018

Liu Qing (simplified Chinese: 刘清; traditional Chinese: 劉清; pinyin: Liú Qīng; born 5 April 1986 in Qingdao) is a former Chinese footballer who played as a defender.

== Club career ==
=== Qingdao Jonoon ===
Liu Qing was at Shandong Luneng from 1997 to 2006 where he rose through and eventually graduated from their various youth teams. He was however unable to break into the senior team and did not make any senior appearances for them so Liu Qing would transfer to another Shandong team when he moved to Qingdao Jonoon in the beginning of the 2007 Chinese Super League season. He would make his debut against Hangzhou Greentown in Qingdao's first league game of the season on 3 March 2007 in a 1–1 draw. With them he would eventually play in 19 league games for them throughout the season and would participate in this team up to 2008.

=== Guizhou Renhe ===
Liu Qing transferred to top tier club Shaanxi Chanba at the beginning of the 2009 Chinese Super League season, however he would have to wait until July 14, 2010, before he made his debut in a league game against Shanghai Shenhua in a 2–1 victory. He would be a peripheral player for the next several seasons and at the beginning of the 2012 Chinese Super League season he would be part of the team which decided to move to Guizhou and renamed themselves Guizhou Renhe.
