= Li Jiahe =

Chinese footballer

Li Jiahe 李家赫
Personal information
- Date of birth: 12 August 1989 (age 37)
- Place of birth: Shenyang, Liaoning, China
- Height: 1.81 m (5 ft 11 1/2 in)
- Position: Midfielder

Senior career*
Years	Team	Apps	(Gls)
2008–2009	Xiangxue Eisiti	23	(0)
2009–2011	Shenzhen Ruby	5	(0)
2012–2016	Harbin Yiteng	69	(6)
2017–2019	Liaoning FC	60	(3)
2020–2021	Sichuan Jiuniu	22	(0)
2022–2024	Dalian Yingbo	0	(0)
- * Club domestic league appearances and goals as of 15 May 2022

Li Jiahe (Chinese: 李家赫; born 12 August 1989) is a Chinese footballer who plays as a midfielder.

== Club career ==
Li Jiahe started his professional footballer career with Shenzhen Ruby in the Chinese Super League. He made his Super League debut for Shenzhen on 22 August 2010 in a game against Xi'an Chanba, coming on as a substitute for Hussein Alaa Hussein in the 57th minute. In February 2012, Li transferred to China League One side Harbin Yiteng.

On 24 January 2017, Li moved to Super League side Liaoning Whowin. In his first season with the club he would be part of the squad that was relegated.

== Career statistics ==
Statistics accurate as of match played 31 December 2020.

Appearances and goals by club, season and competition
Club	Season	League			National Cup		League Cup		Continental		Other		Total	
Club	Season	Division	Apps	Goals	Apps	Goals	Apps	Goals	Apps	Goals	Apps	Goals	Apps	Goals
Xiangxue Eisiti	2008–09	Hong Kong First Division League	23	0	1	0	1	0	-		1 (Note: Appearances in Hong Kong Senior Challenge Shield)	0	26	0
Shenzhen Ruby	2010	Chinese Super League	1	0	-		-		-		-		1	0
Shenzhen Ruby	2011	Chinese Super League	3	0	0	0	-		-		-		3	0
Shenzhen Ruby	Total		4	0	0	0	0	0	0	0	0	0	4	0
Harbin Yiteng	2012	China League One	3	0	0	0	-		-		-		3	0
Harbin Yiteng	2013	China League One	16	0	2	2	-		-		-		18	2
Harbin Yiteng	2014	Chinese Super League	11	0	1	0	-		-		-		12	0
Harbin Yiteng	2015	China League One	15	3	1	0	-		-		-		16	3
Harbin Yiteng	2016	China League One	24	3	0	0	-		-		-		24	3
Harbin Yiteng	Total		69	6	4	2	0	0	0	0	0	0	73	8
Liaoning FC	2017	Chinese Super League	14	0	1	0	-		-		-		15	0
Liaoning FC	2018	China League One	20	1	2	0	-		-		-		22	1
Liaoning FC	2019	China League One	26	2	0	0	-		-		-		26	2
Liaoning FC	Total		60	3	3	0	0	0	0	0	0	0	63	3
Sichuan Jiuniu	2020	China League One	13	0	-		-		-		-		13	0
Career total			169	9	8	2	1	0	0	0	1	0	179	11
