= Liu Jun (footballer) =

Chinese footballer

Liu Jun 刘军
Personal information
- Date of birth: September 25, 1983 (age 43)
- Place of birth: Qingdao, Shandong, China
- Height: 1.90 m (6 ft 3 in)
- Position: Goalkeeper

Youth career
- 1999–2004: Guangdong Mingfeng
- 2005–2006: Qingdao University

Senior career*
Years	Team	Apps	(Gls)
2007–2020	Qingdao Jonoon	71	(0)
- * Club domestic league appearances and goals as of 31 December 2020

Liu Jun (simplified Chinese: 刘军; traditional Chinese: 劉軍; pinyin: Liú Jun; born September 25, 1983, in Qingdao, Shandong) is a Chinese football goalkeeper.

== Club career ==
=== Guandong Mingfeng ===
As a youngster Liu Jun would be called up to the various levels of the Chinese national youth teams while he was with the Guangdong Mingfeng youth team. Despite playing for a team who were at the bottom of the Chinese pyramid he would, however be unable to break into the senior team of Guangdong Mingfeng. The club would decide not to continue to play within the professional Chinese pyramid anymore and Liu Jun was allowed to leave to continue with his studies where he went to Qingdao University and played amateur football with them.

=== Qingdao Jonoon ===
Despite playing at a lower level Liu Jun was brought into the Chinese Super League by Qingdao Zhongneng (now known as Qingdao Jonoon) as back up for their goalkeeper Liu Zhenli during the 2007 league season. He would have to wait a whole season before he could make his debut for Qingdao on July 6, 2008, against Beijing Guoan in a 1–0 defeat. A constant understudy within the team he would only become a consistent member of the starting lineup after first choice keeper Liu Zhenli was injured in September 2009 and while he impressed for a short period Liu Zhenli quickly regained his position.

== Career statistics ==
Statistics accurate as of match played 31 December 2020.

Appearances and goals by club, season and competition
Club	Season	League			National Cup		Continental		Other		Total	
Club	Season	Division	Apps	Goals	Apps	Goals	Apps	Goals	Apps	Goals	Apps	Goals
Qingdao Jonoon	2006	Chinese Super League	0	0	0	0	-		-		0	0
Qingdao Jonoon	2007	Chinese Super League	0	0	-		-		-		0	0
Qingdao Jonoon	2008	Chinese Super League	2	0	-		-		-		2	0
Qingdao Jonoon	2009	Chinese Super League	4	0	-		-		-		4	0
Qingdao Jonoon	2010	Chinese Super League	18	0	-		-		-		18	0
Qingdao Jonoon	2011	Chinese Super League	18	0	0	0	-		-		18	0
Qingdao Jonoon	2012	Chinese Super League	0	0	1	0	-		-		1	0
Qingdao Jonoon	2013	Chinese Super League	0	0	1	0	-		-		1	0
Qingdao Jonoon	2014	China League One	1	0	0	0	-		-		1	0
Qingdao Jonoon	2015	China League One	0	0	1	0	-		-		1	0
Qingdao Jonoon	2016	China League One	28	0	0	0	-		-		28	0
Qingdao Jonoon	2017	China League Two	0	0	0	0	-		-		0	0
Qingdao Jonoon	2018	China League Two	0	0	0	0	-		-		0	0
Qingdao Jonoon	2019	China League Two	0	0	0	0	-		-		0	0
Qingdao Jonoon	2020	China League Two	0	0	-		-		-		0	0
Qingdao Jonoon	Total		71	0	3	0	0	0	0	0	74	0
Career total			71	0	3	0	0	0	0	0	74	0
