= Wu Wei (footballer, born 1983) =

Chinese footballer

Wu Wei 吴伟
Personal information
- Date of birth: 10 March 1983 (age 43)
- Place of birth: Tianjin, China
- Height: 1.95 m (6 ft 5 in)
- Position: Defender

Senior career*
Years	Team	Apps	(Gls)
2002–2011	Hangzhou Greentown	86	(4)
2012–2013	Guizhou Renhe	20	(0)
2014–2016	Hangzhou Greentown	18	(1)
- * Club domestic league appearances and goals as of 1 November 2016

Wu Wei (simplified Chinese: 吴伟; traditional Chinese: 吳偉; pinyin: Wú Wěi; born 10 March 1983 in Tianjin) is a Chinese former football player who played as a defender and currently coach of China League One club Zhejiang Greentown.

== Club career ==
Wu started his professional career with Chinese Jia-B League side Zhejiang Greentown in 2002. He made an impression within the team in the early years as Zhejiang Greentown won promotion to the first tier at the end of the 2006 season.

He joined Scottish side Forfar Athletic in 2009 forming a partnership with Charlie Adameno known as "The Dream Ticket". He shared a flat with fellow Chinese player Tan Yang at this time.

He was a substitute player when Zhejiang Greentown played in the Chinese Super League and was released in January 2012 after Takeshi Okada became the head coach of the club.

Wu joined Guizhou Renhe in February 2012. He made 6 appearances for Guizhou in the 2012 league season, all coming on as substitute.

In January 2014, Wu returned to Hangzhou Greentown after Okada left the club.

== Honours ==
Guizhou Renhe

- Chinese FA Cup: 2013
