= Wang Weicheng =

Chinese footballer

Wang Weicheng 王维成
Personal information
- Date of birth: 2 September 1991 (age 35)
- Place of birth: Chongqing, Sichuan, China
- Height: 1.80 m (5 ft 11 in)
- Position: Central midfielder

Senior career*
Years	Team	Apps	(Gls)
2010–2020	Chongqing Lifan	34	(0)
2021	Shanxi Longjin	26	(0)
2022–2024	Chongqing Tongliangloong	26	(2)
- * Club domestic league appearances and goals as of 31 December 2023

Wang Weicheng (Chinese: 王维成; pinyin: Wáng Wéichéng; born 2 September 1991) was a Chinese football player who played as a central midfielder.

== Club career ==
Wang Weicheng started his football career when he was promoted to Chongqing Lifan's first team in the 2010 season. On 4 May 2011, he made his senior debut in the first round of 2011 Chinese FA Cup against Beijing Baxy. He scored his first goal in the match, which ensured Chongqing's 3–0 home victory. Wang made his Super League debut on 6 March 2016, in a 2–1 home win against Guangzhou Evergrande, coming on as a substitute for Fernandinho in the 86th minute.

== Career statistics ==
As of 31 December 2023.

Appearances and goals by club, season and competition
Club	Season	League			National Cup		Continental		Other		Total	
Club	Season	Division	Apps	Goals	Apps	Goals	Apps	Goals	Apps	Goals	Apps	Goals
Chongqing Lifan	2010	Chinese Super League	0	0	-		-		-		0	0
Chongqing Lifan	2011	China League One	2	0	2	1	-		-		4	1
Chongqing Lifan	2012	China League One	0	0	2	0	-		-		2	0
Chongqing Lifan	2013	China League One	0	0	2	2	-		-		2	2
Chongqing Lifan	2014	China League One	0	0	0	0	-		-		0	0
Chongqing Lifan	2015	Chinese Super League	0	0	0	0	-		-		0	0
Chongqing Lifan	2016	Chinese Super League	12	0	1	0	-		-		13	0
Chongqing Lifan	2017	Chinese Super League	17	0	1	0	-		-		18	0
Chongqing Lifan	2018	Chinese Super League	3	0	2	0	-		-		5	0
Chongqing Lifan	2019	Chinese Super League	0	0	0	0	-		-		0	0
Chongqing Lifan	Total		34	0	10	3	0	0	0	0	44	3
Shanxi Longjin	2021	China League Two	26	0	0	0	-		-		26	0
Chongqing Tongliangloong	2023	China League Two	15	2	1	0	-		-		16	2
Career total			75	2	11	3	0	0	0	0	86	5

== Honours ==
=== Club ===
Chongqing Lifan

- China League One: 2014

Chongqing Tongliangloong

- China League Two: 2023
