= Li Chunyu =

Chinese footballer

Li Chunyu 李春郁
Personal information
- Date of birth: October 9, 1986 (age 40)
- Place of birth: Shenyang, Liaoning, China
- Height: 1.82 m (5 ft 11 1/2 in)
- Position: Midfielder

Senior career*
Years	Team	Apps	(Gls)
2004–2009	Changsha Ginde	65	(3)
2010	Rad	1	(0)
2010	Gangwon FC	7	(0)
2011–2014	Guizhou Renhe	84	(1)
2015–2019	Shijiazhuang Ever Bright	68	(1)
2020	Shanghai Jiading Boji	6	(0)

International career
2003	China U17	3	(0)
2010	China	1	(0)
Medal record
Representing China
Men's football
AFC U-17 Championship
Bronze medal – third place	2002 UAE	Team
- * Club domestic league appearances and goals

Li Chunyu (simplified Chinese: 李春郁; traditional Chinese: 李春鬱; pinyin: Li Chūnyù; born October 9, 1986) is a Chinese former professional footballer who played as a midfielder.

== Club career ==
Li Chunyu began his professional football career with Chinese Super League club Shenyang Ginde where he would make his league debut against Liaoning Zhongyu on October 31, 2004, in a 3–1 defeat. He would gradually establish himself as regular within the center of their midfield and when the club decided to move to Changsha and rename themselves Changsha Ginde he would join them. By the 2007 league season he would become an integral member of their team and go on to score his first league goal on March 19, against Shanghai Shenhua in a 1–1 draw.

In January 2010 he moved abroad to Europe to play for Serbian top tier club FK Rad where he would go on to make his league debut on March 14, 2010, against OFK Beograd in a 3–2 defeat. During his time at the club he would receive very little playing time and was released at the end of the season. As a free agent he would transfer to K-League side Gangwon FC in July 2010 and would go on to make his league debut against Ulsan Hyundai on August 7, 2010, in a 2–2 draw. Despite only joining the club halfway through their league campaign he would go on to make seven league appearances by the end of the season.

Li would return to China and signed with Shaanxi Zhongjian Chanba playing in the Chinese Super League, with a club renamed a year later to Guizhou Renhe. His return to China would see him quickly establish himself as a regular with his club and go on to win his first piece of silverware with the 2013 Chinese FA Cup.

On 4 January 2015, Li transferred to fellow Chinese Super League side Shijiazhuang Yongchang. The following season he was unfortunately part of the team that was relegated at the end of the 2016 Chinese Super League season. He would remain with Shijiazhuang within the second tier until they won promotion back into the Chinese top tier when they came runners-up at the end of the 2019 league campaign.

== International career ==
As a youngster he was part of China national under-17 football team and was considered good enough to take part in the 2003 FIFA U-17 World Championship where he played in all of China's games during the tournament. His time within the Chinese set-up didn't really go much further until he gained regular playing time with Gangwon FC and it was only once he achieved this he was given his senior debut in a friendly against Latvia on November 17, 2010, in a 1–0 victory for China.

== Career statistics ==
Statistics accurate as of match played 31 December 2020.

Appearances and goals by club, season and competition
Club	Season	League			National Cup		Continental		Other		Total	
Club	Season	Division	Apps	Goals	Apps	Goals	Apps	Goals	Apps	Goals	Apps	Goals
Changsha Ginde	2004	Chinese Super League	5	0	0	0	—		—		5	0
Changsha Ginde	2005	Chinese Super League	16	0	0	0	—		—		16	0
Changsha Ginde	2006	Chinese Super League	5	0	1	0	—		—		6	0
Changsha Ginde	2007	Chinese Super League	20	3	—		—		—		20	3
Changsha Ginde	2008	Chinese Super League	18	0	—		—		—		18	0
Changsha Ginde	2009	Chinese Super League	1	0	—		—		—		1	0
Changsha Ginde	Total		65	3	1	0	0	0	0	0	66	3
Rad	2009–10	Serbian SuperLiga	1	0	0	0	—		—		1	0
Gangwon FC	2010	K League 1	7	0	0	0	—		—		7	0
Guizhou Renhe	2011	Chinese Super League	21	0	0	0	—		—		21	0
Guizhou Renhe	2012	Chinese Super League	23	0	1	0	—		—		24	0
Guizhou Renhe	2013	Chinese Super League	20	1	4	0	3	0	—		27	1
Guizhou Renhe	2014	Chinese Super League	20	0	1	0	3	0	1 (Note: Appearances in Chinese FA Super Cup)	0	25	0
Guizhou Renhe	Total		84	1	6	0	6	0	1	0	97	1
Shijiazhuang Ever Bright	2015	Chinese Super League	23	1	0	0	—		—		23	1
Shijiazhuang Ever Bright	2016	Chinese Super League	20	0	0	0	—		—		20	0
Shijiazhuang Ever Bright	2017	China League One	7	0	0	0	—		—		7	0
Shijiazhuang Ever Bright	2018	China League One	14	0	0	0	—		—		14	0
Shijiazhuang Ever Bright	2019	China League One	4	0	2	0	—		—		6	0
Shijiazhuang Ever Bright	Total		68	1	2	0	0	0	0	0	70	1
Shanghai Jiading Boji	2020	China League Two	6	0	—		—		—		6	0
Career total			231	5	9	0	6	0	1	0	247	5

== Honours ==
Guizhou Renhe

- Chinese FA Cup: 2013
- Chinese FA Super Cup: 2014

== External sources ==
- His arrival at FK Rad official site
- Profile at Srbijafudbal
- Li Chunyu – K League stats at kleague.com (in Korean and English)
- Li Chunyu – FIFA competition record (archived)
- Li Chunyu at National-Football-Teams.com
- Li Chunyu at Soccerway (archived)
