= Yu Le =

Chinese footballer

Yu Le 于乐
Personal information
- Date of birth: February 26, 1985 (age 41)
- Place of birth: Beijing, China
- Height: 1.87 m (6 ft 1 1/2 in)
- Position: Forward

Youth career
- Beijing Guoan

Senior career*
Years	Team	Apps	(Gls)
2006–2011	Henan Jianye	45	(4)
2012–2017	Shenzhen Ruby	82	(9)
- * Club domestic league appearances and goals as of 28 October 2017

Yu Le (Chinese: 于乐; born 26 February 1985, in Beijing) is a Chinese former football player.

== Club career ==
In 2006, Yu Le started his professional footballer career with Henan Jianye in the China League One. He would eventually make his league debut for Henan on 29 April 2007 in a game against Dalian Shide, coming on as a substitute for Arthur Gómez in the 46th minute.

In February 2012, Yu transferred to China League One side Shenzhen Ruby.

== Career statistics ==
Statistics accurate as of match played 28 October 2017

Club performance			League		Cup		League Cup		Continental		Total	
Season	Club	League	Apps	Goals	Apps	Goals	Apps	Goals	Apps	Goals	Apps	Goals
China PR			League		FA Cup		CSL Cup		Asia		Total	
2006	Henan Jianye	China League One	1	0	0	0	-		-		1	0
2007	Henan Jianye	Chinese Super League	9	1	-		-		-		9	1
2008	Henan Jianye	Chinese Super League	8	0	-		-		-		8	0
2009	Henan Jianye	Chinese Super League	5	0	-		-		-		5	0
2010	Henan Jianye	Chinese Super League	15	3	-		-		2	1	17	4
2011	Henan Jianye	Chinese Super League	7	0	2	0	-		-		9	0
2012	Shenzhen Ruby	China League One	10	2	2	0	-		-		12	2
2013	Shenzhen Ruby	China League One	23	5	1	2	-		-		24	7
2014	Shenzhen Ruby	China League One	25	2	2	1	-		-		27	3
2015	Shenzhen Ruby	China League One	13	0	1	0	-		-		14	0
2016	Shenzhen Ruby	China League One	11	0	1	0	-		-		12	0
2017	Shenzhen Ruby	China League One	0	0	0	0	-		-		0	0
Total	China PR		127	13	8	3	0	0	2	1	138	17

== Honours ==
Henan Jianye

- China League One: 2006
