= Tang Chen =

Hong Kong actress

Tang Chen (Chinese: 唐真; pinyin: Táng Zhēn) is a Hong Kong actress. She was active primarily in the 1950s and 1960s.

== Filmography ==
- Blossoms in the Heart (1952)
- The Golden World (1953)
- The Beauty and the Dumb (1954)
- The Chase (1956)
- Love Fiesta (1957)
- Air Hostess (1959)
- Lady on the Roof (1959)
- A Shot in the Dark (1960)
