= Zhao Jun (footballer, born 1988) =

Chinese footballer

Zhao Jun 赵均
Personal information
- Date of birth: October 19, 1988 (age 38)
- Place of birth: Liaoning, China
- Height: 1.75 m (5 ft 9 in)
- Position: Midfielder

Senior career*
Years	Team	Apps	(Gls)
2009–2013	Beijing Baxy	45	(4)
2014–2016	Guizhou Renhe	0	(0)
2017–2018	Shenyang Urban	23	(0)
- * Club domestic league appearances and goals as of 13 October 2018

Zhao Jun (Chinese: 赵均; born 19 October 1988 in Liaoning) is a Chinese football player.

== Club career ==
In 2009, Zhao Jun started his professional footballer career with Beijing Baxy in the China League Two.

In February 2014, Zhao moved to Chinese Super League side Guizhou Renhe on a free transfer. On 22 April 2014, Zhao made his debut for Guizhou Renhe in the 2014 AFC Champions League against Western Sydney Wanderers, coming on as a substitute for Guo Sheng in the 82nd minute.

== Club career statistics ==
Statistics accurate as of match played 13 October 2018

Club performance			League		Cup		League Cup		Continental		Total	
Season	Club	League	Apps	Goals	Apps	Goals	Apps	Goals	Apps	Goals	Apps	Goals
China PR			League		FA Cup		CSL Cup		Asia		Total	
2009	Beijing Baxy	China League Two			-		-		-			
2010	Beijing Baxy	China League One	5	0	-		-		-		5	0
2011	Beijing Baxy	China League One	4	0	1	0	-		-		5	0
2012	Beijing Baxy	China League One	29	4	1	0	-		-		30	4
2013	Beijing Baxy	China League One	7	0	1	0	-		-		8	0
2014	Guizhou Renhe	Chinese Super League	0	0	0	0	-		1	0	1	0
2015	Guizhou Renhe	Chinese Super League	0	0	0	0	-		-		0	0
2017	Shenyang Urban	China League Two	8	0	0	0	-		-		8	0
2018	Shenyang Urban	China League Two	15	0	1	0	-		-		16	0
Total	China PR		68	4	4	0	0	0	1	0	73	4
