= Léo San =

Brazilian footballer

Personal information
- Full name: Leonardo Henriques da Silva
- Date of birth: July 22, 1982 (age 44)
- Place of birth: Penápolis, Brazil
- Height: 1.85 m (6 ft 1 in)
- Position: Defender

Youth career
- 2000–2002: Guarani

Senior career*
Years	Team	Apps	(Gls)
2002–2003	Guarani	0	(?)
2004–2009	Montedio Yamagata	221	(11)
2010	Avaí	5	(0)
2011–2012	Qingdao Jonoon	49	(2)
- * Club domestic league appearances and goals as of October 16, 2010 ‡ National team caps and goals as of October 16, 2010

Leonardo Henriques da Silva (Penápolis, July 22, 1982), also known as Léo San, is a Brazilian footballer who acts as a defender.

== Career ==
Léo San began his career in the youth of the Guarani and was still very early work in Japanese football. In 2004, he was hired by Montedio Yamagata where he remained until the end of 2009. In the 2010 season, he appeared to reinforce the regional competitions would compete Avaí where national and international.

In March 2011, he has agreed to move Chinese Super League side Qingdao Jonoon.

== Club statistics ==
Club performance			League		Cup		League Cup		Continental		Total	
Season	Club	League	Apps	Goals	Apps	Goals	Apps	Goals	Apps	Goals	Apps	Goals
Japan			League		Emperor's Cup		J.League Cup		Asia		Total	
2004	Montedio Yamagata	J2 League	38	0	2	0	-		-		40	0
2005	Montedio Yamagata	J2 League	36	0	2	0	-		-		38	0
2006	Montedio Yamagata	J2 League	45	5	2	0	-		-		47	5
2007	Montedio Yamagata	J2 League	43	1	2	0	-		-		45	1
2008	Montedio Yamagata	J2 League	38	4	2	0	-		-		40	4
2009	Montedio Yamagata	J1 League	21	1	0	0	0	0	-		21	1
Brazil			League		Copa do Brasil		League Cup		South America		Total	
2010	Avaí	Brasileiro Série A	5	0	0	0	-		-		5	0
Country	Japan		221	11	10	0	0	0	-		231	11
Country	Brazil		5	0	0	0	-		-		5	0
Total			226	11	10	0	0	0	-		236	11

== Honours ==
Avaí

Campeonato Catarinense: 2010
