= Gustavo Rodas =

Argentine footballer

Personal information
- Full name: Gustavo Ariel Rodas
- Date of birth: 16 January 1986 (age 40)
- Place of birth: Rosario, Santa Fe, Argentina
- Height: 1.67 m (5 ft 6 in)
- Position: Attacking midfielder

Senior career*
Years	Team	Apps	(Gls)
2002–2006	Newell's Old Boys	32	(2)
2007	Tiro Federal	14	(1)
2008	El Porvenir	2	(0)
2008	Cúcuta Deportivo	2	(0)
2008–2009	Coronel Bolognesi	23	(4)
2010	León de Huánuco	38	(10)
2011	Deportivo Quito	10	(0)
2012	Guizhou Renhe	6	(0)
2012–2013	León de Huánuco	10	(0)
2014–2015	Talleres Córdoba	15	(1)
2016	Wilstermann	20	(2)
2017	AA Estudiantes	?	(?)
2017–2018	César Vallejo	8	(2)

International career
2003	Argentina U-17		
- * Club domestic league appearances and goals as of 21 December 2017

Gustavo Rodas (born 16 January 1986 in Rosario, Santa Fe, Argentina) is an Argentine footballer who most recently played for César Vallejo.

== Club careers ==
Rodas started his career in 2002 with Argentina's Primera División club Newell's Old Boys. He made his senior debut in a 4–1 victory against Talleres de Córdoba and scored the fourth goal in the match, which made him the youngest player to score a goal in the Argentina's first division.

Rodas moved to Chinese Super League side Guizhou Renhe in January 2012. He was deemed as the key player of Guizhou by the team manager Gao Hongbo and made his Super League debut on 10 March, in a 2–1 home victory against Shandong Luneng Taishan. However, Rodas and his family could not adapt their lives in Guiyang, and he found it hard to find a Spanish school for his children. On 7 May, Rodas had his Guizhou Renhe contract terminated by mutual consent.

Rodas returned to Peru's Torneo Descentralizado side León de Huánuco in July 2012.

== Honours ==
- Newell's Old Boys
  - Argentine Primera División: Apertura 2004
- Deportivo Quito
  - Ecuadorian Serie A: 2011
- Argentina U-17
  - South American Under-17 Football Championship: 2003
