= Liu Tianqi =

Chinese footballer (born 1989)

Liu Tianqi 刘天祺
Personal information
- Date of birth: 17 January 1989 (age 37)
- Place of birth: Jixi, Heilongjiang, China
- Height: 1.82 m (5 ft 11 1/2 in)
- Position: Full back

Youth career
- 2005–2008: Shaanxi Chanba

Senior career*
| Years | Team | Apps | (Gls) |
| 2008 | → Shaanxi Star (loan) | | |
| 2009–2017 | Beijing Renhe | 54 | (0) |
| 2010–2011 | → Dalian Aerbin (loan) | 28 | (0) |
| 2014 | → Taiyuan Zhongyou Jiayi (loan) | 11 | (0) |
| 2018 | Dalian Transcendence | 6 | (0) |
| 2019–2020 | Shenyang Urban | 32 | (0) |
| 2021 | Xi'an Wolves | 9 | (0) |

Managerial career
- 2022: Guanxi Pingguo Haliao (assistant)
- 2024: Shanghai Jiading Huilong (assistant)
- 2025: Shijiazhuang Gongfu (assistant)
- * Club domestic league appearances and goals as of 31 December 2020

Liu Tianqi (Chinese: 刘天祺; pinyin: Liú Tiānqí; born 17 January 1989) is a Chinese football coach and former football player.

== Club career ==
Liu was born in Jixi, Heilongjiang and moved to Shenyang with his family when he was still a boy. He began to play organized football in Zhuang Yi Football School and later moved to Chinese Super League side Shaanxi Chanba's youth team system. He started his professional football career in 2008 when he was loaned to China League Two club Shaanxi Star (Shaanxi Baorong Chanba's youth team) for one year. Liu was promoted to Shaanxi Baorong Chanba's first team squad by Cheng Yaodong in 2009. However, as Shaanxi struggled at the bottom of the league, he did not appear for the club in the 2009 league season. On 9 May 2010, in the first match after Milorad Kosanović took over the club, which Shaanxi Baorong Chanba played against Nanchang Hengyuan at home, Liu made his debut for Shaanxi and played as a starter in the right-back position, but was substituted by Xin Feng in the 29th minute.

Just playing one match for Shaanxi, Liu was loaned to League Two club Dalian Aerbin in the summer of 2010. He made 10 appearances in the second half of the 2010 season as Dalian Aerbin finished the first place and won promotion to League One. Dalian Aerbin extended Liu's loan deal for one year in 2011. Liu played 18 matches in the League One, the club won two consecutive champions and promotions and entered the top flight in the 2011 season.

Liu returned to Shaanxi Baorong Chanba which moved their home stadium to Guiyang and changed their name into Guizhou Renhe later for the 2012 Super League campaign. He was highly appraised by the manager Gao Hongbo and gained a regular starter as a full back. He made 32 appearances in the 2012 season as the club achieved fourth place in the Super League and runners-up in the FA Cup and gained the entry into AFC Champions League for the first time. Liu was excluded from Beijing Renhe's squad in the 2017 season. On 7 April 2017, he received a ban of six months by the Chinese Football Association for age falsification.

On 28 February 2018, Liu transferred to China League One side Dalian Transcendence.

In March 2019, Liu transferred to China League Two side Shenyang Urban. He would go on to win the 2019 China League Two division with the club.

== Career statistics ==
Statistics accurate as of match played 31 December 2020.

| Club | Season | League | | | National Cup | | Continental | | Other | | Total | |
| Club | Season | Division | Apps | Goals | Apps | Goals | Apps | Goals | Apps | Goals | Apps | Goals |
|---|---|---|---|---|---|---|---|---|---|---|---|---|
| Shaanxi Star (loan) | 2008 | China League Two | | | - | | - | | - | | | |
| Shaanxi Baorong Chanba/ Guizhou Renhe/ Beijing Renhe | 2009 | Chinese Super League | 0 | 0 | - | | - | | - | | 0 | 0 |
| Shaanxi Baorong Chanba/ Guizhou Renhe/ Beijing Renhe | 2010 | Chinese Super League | 1 | 0 | - | | - | | - | | 1 | 0 |
| Shaanxi Baorong Chanba/ Guizhou Renhe/ Beijing Renhe | 2012 | Chinese Super League | 27 | 0 | 5 | 0 | - | | - | | 32 | 0 |
| Shaanxi Baorong Chanba/ Guizhou Renhe/ Beijing Renhe | 2013 | Chinese Super League | 8 | 0 | 2 | 0 | 0 | 0 | - | | 10 | 0 |
| Shaanxi Baorong Chanba/ Guizhou Renhe/ Beijing Renhe | 2014 | Chinese Super League | 1 | 0 | 0 | 0 | 1 | 0 | 0 (Note: Appearances in Chinese FA Super Cup) | 0 | 2 | 0 |
| Shaanxi Baorong Chanba/ Guizhou Renhe/ Beijing Renhe | 2015 | Chinese Super League | 4 | 0 | 1 | 0 | - | | - | | 5 | 0 |
| Shaanxi Baorong Chanba/ Guizhou Renhe/ Beijing Renhe | 2016 | China League One | 13 | 0 | 2 | 0 | - | | - | | 15 | 0 |
| Shaanxi Baorong Chanba/ Guizhou Renhe/ Beijing Renhe | Total | | 54 | 0 | 10 | 0 | 1 | 0 | 0 | 0 | 65 | 0 |
| Dalian Aerbin (loan) | 2010 | China League Two | 10 | 0 | - | | - | | - | | 10 | 0 |
| Dalian Aerbin (loan) | 2011 | China League One | 18 | 0 | 0 | 0 | - | | - | | 18 | 0 |
| Dalian Aerbin (loan) | Total | | 28 | 0 | 0 | 0 | 0 | 0 | 0 | 0 | 28 | 0 |
| Taiyuan Zhongyou Jiayi (loan) | 2014 | China League Two | 11 | 0 | - | | - | | - | | 11 | 0 |
| Dalian Transcendence | 2018 | China League One | 6 | 0 | 0 | 0 | - | | - | | 6 | 0 |
| Shenyang Urban | 2019 | China League Two | 27 | 0 | 0 | 0 | - | | - | | 27 | 0 |
| Shenyang Urban | 2020 | China League One | 5 | 0 | - | | - | | - | | 5 | 0 |
| Shenyang Urban | Total | | 32 | 0 | 0 | 0 | 0 | 0 | 0 | 0 | 32 | 0 |
| Career total | | | 131 | 0 | 10 | 0 | 1 | 0 | 0 | 0 | 142 | 0 |

== Honours ==
=== Club ===
Dalian Aerbin

- China League One: 2011
- China League Two: 2010

Guizhou Renhe

- Chinese FA Cup: 2013
- Chinese FA Super Cup: 2014

Shenyang Urban

- China League Two: 2019
