= Chen Tang (footballer) =

Chinese footballer (born 1996)

Chen Tang 陈唐
Personal information
- Full name: Chen Tang
- Date of birth: 16 February 1996 (age 30)
- Place of birth: Shenyang, Liaoning, China
- Height: 1.75 m (5 ft 9 in)
- Position: Midfielder

Team information
- Current team: Hefei City

Youth career
- 2013–2015: Guangzhou R&F
- 2016–2017: Hebei China Fortune

Senior career*
Years	Team	Apps	(Gls)
2017–2022	Hebei China Fortune	7	(0)
2022-	Hefei City	0	(0)
- * Club domestic league appearances and goals as of 20 April 2022

Chen Tang (Chinese: 陈唐; born 16 February 1996) is a Chinese footballer who plays as midfielder for Hefei City.

== Club career ==
Chen Tang was promoted to Chinese Super League side Hebei China Fortune first team squad by manager Manuel Pellegrini in the summer of 2017. He made his senior debut on 26 August 2018 in a 2–2 away draw against Changchun Yatai, coming on as a substitute for Gao Huaze in the 78th minute.

== Career statistics ==
As of 31 December 2020.

Appearances and goals by club, season and competition
Club	Season	League			National Cup		Continental		Other		Total	
Club	Season	Division	Apps	Goals	Apps	Goals	Apps	Goals	Apps	Goals	Apps	Goals
Hebei China Fortune	2017	Chinese Super League	0	0	0	0	-		-		0	0
Hebei China Fortune	2018	Chinese Super League	7	0	0	0	-		-		7	0
Hebei China Fortune	2019	Chinese Super League	0	0	0	0	-		-		0	0
Hebei China Fortune	Total		7	0	0	0	0	0	0	0	7	0
Career total			7	0	0	0	0	0	0	0	7	0
