= Dong Yang =

Chinese footballer

Dong Yang 董阳
Personal information
- Date of birth: January 14, 1983 (age 43)
- Place of birth: Beijing, China
- Height: 1.87 m (6 ft 1 1/2 in)
- Position: Defender

Youth career
- 1997–1998: Qinhuangdao Football School
- 1998–2002: Shanghai Shenhua

Senior career*
Years	Team	Apps	(Gls)
2003–2008	Shanghai Shenhua	10	(1)
2009–2010	Shanghai Zobon	34	(1)
2011	Beijing Baxy	23	(2)
2012	Guizhou Renhe	3	(0)
- * Club domestic league appearances and goals as of End of 2012 Chinese league season

Dong Yang (Chinese: 董阳; pinyin: Dǒng Yáng) (born 14 January 1983) is a Chinese football player.

== Club career ==
Dong began to play organized football in Qinhuangdao Football School and moved to Shanghai Shenhua youth team system in 1998. He was sent to Brazil for further training and promoted to Shanghai Shenhua's first team squad in 2003, however he wouldn't make his debut until the following season. Once he made his debut in the 2004 campaign he failed to establish himself within the first team and made just 10 league appearances for Shanghai Shenhua by the end of the 2008 season. He transferred to China League One side Shanghai Zobon in 2009 and became the captain of the club. He made another move in 2011 when he signed a contract with hometown club Beijing Baxy. He played as a regular player in the center back, scoring 2 goals in 23 appearances in the 2011 season. Dong transferred to Super League side Guizhou Renhe in 2012.
