= Yao Jiangshan =

Chinese footballer

Yao Jiangshan 姚江山
Personal information
- Full name: Yao Jiangshan
- Date of birth: 30 July 1987 (age 39)
- Place of birth: Qingdao, Shandong, China
- Height: 1.75 m (5 ft 9 in)
- Position: Midfielder

Youth career
- Qingdao Jonoon

Senior career*
Years	Team	Apps	(Gls)
2006–2014	Qingdao Jonoon	158	(5)
2015–2016	Hunan Billows	36	(3)
2017–2020	Qingdao Huanghai	70	(5)
2021	Qingdao Hainiu	9	(1)
- * Club domestic league appearances and goals as of 31 December 2020

Yao Jiangshan (Chinese: 姚江山; pinyin: Yáo Jiāngshān; born 30 July 1987) is a Chinese former footballer who played as a midfielder.

== Club career ==
Yao started his professional football career in 2006 when he was promoted to Qingdao Jonoon's first squad. He made his senior debut on 11 March 2007, in a 2–0 victory against Liaoning FC. He quickly established himself with the first team and scored his first senior goal on 5 September 2007, in a 1–1 home draw with Inter Xi'an. He was linked with K League Classic side Daejeon Citizen in early 2013, however, he finally stayed at Qingdao for the 2013 league campaign.

On 3 January 2015, Yao transferred to fellow China League One side Hunan Billows. On 23 February 2017, Yao transferred to his hometown club Qingdao Huanghai. He would become an integral member of the team that would win the 2019 China League One division and promotion into the top tier.

== Career statistics ==
Statistics accurate as of match played 31 December 2020.

Appearances and goals by club, season and competition
Club	Season	League			National Cup		Continental		Other		Total	
Club	Season	Division	Apps	Goals	Apps	Goals	Apps	Goals	Apps	Goals	Apps	Goals
Qingdao Jonoon	2006	Chinese Super League	0	0	0	0	-		-		0	0
Qingdao Jonoon	2007	Chinese Super League	24	1	-		-		-		24	1
Qingdao Jonoon	2008	Chinese Super League	25	1	-		-		-		25	1
Qingdao Jonoon	2009	Chinese Super League	6	0	-		-		-		6	0
Qingdao Jonoon	2010	Chinese Super League	25	1	-		-		-		25	1
Qingdao Jonoon	2011	Chinese Super League	25	1	0	0	-		-		25	1
Qingdao Jonoon	2012	Chinese Super League	29	1	1	0	-		-		30	1
Qingdao Jonoon	2013	Chinese Super League	12	0	1	0	-		-		13	0
Qingdao Jonoon	2014	China League One	12	0	1	0	-		-		13	0
Qingdao Jonoon	Total		158	5	3	0	0	0	0	0	161	5
Hunan Billows	2015	China League One	22	3	0	0	-		-		22	3
Hunan Billows	2016	China League One	14	0	1	0	-		-		15	0
Hunan Billows	Total		36	3	1	0	0	0	0	0	37	3
Qingdao Huanghai	2017	China League One	21	1	1	0	-		-		22	1
Qingdao Huanghai	2018	China League One	19	2	0	0	-		-		19	2
Qingdao Huanghai	2019	China League One	26	2	0	0	-		-		26	2
Qingdao Huanghai	2020	Chinese Super League	4	0	1	0	-		-		5	0
Qingdao Huanghai	Total		70	5	2	0	0	0	0	0	72	5
Career total			264	13	6	0	0	0	0	0	270	13

== Honours ==
=== Club ===
Qingdao Huanghai

- China League One: 2019
