= Zhu Shiyu =

Chinese footballer

Zhu Shiyu 朱世玉
Personal information
- Full name: Zhu Shiyu
- Date of birth: 16 April 1991 (age 35)
- Place of birth: Qingdao, Shandong, China
- Height: 1.75 m (5 ft 9 in)
- Position: Midfielder

Youth career
- Qingdao Jonoon

Senior career*
| Years | Team | Apps | (Gls) |
| 2010–2017 | Qingdao Jonoon | 110 | (15) |
| 2018–2021 | Shenyang Urban | 83 | (32) |
| 2022 | Qingdao Hainiu | 16 | (1) |
| 2023–2025 | Dalian K'un City | 30 | (7) |
- * Club domestic league appearances and goals as of 31 December 2022

Zhu Shiyu (Chinese: 朱世玉; pinyin: Zhū Shìyù; born 16 April 1991) is a Chinese footballer who plays as a left-footed midfielder.

== Club career ==
Zhu started his professional football career in 2010 when he was promoted to Qingdao Jonoon's first squad. He made his senior debut on 12 September 2010, in a 4–3 away victory against Shenzhen Ruby, coming on as a substitute for Stjepan Jukić in the 82nd minute. He began to earn regular playing time in the 2011 league season. He scored his first senior goal on 4 August 2012, in a 3–1 home win against Liaoning Whowin. At the end of the 2013 Chinese Super League campaign he would be part of the squad that was relegated. This would be followed by another relegation at the end of the 2016 China League One campaign.

Zhu would join another third tier club in Shenyang Urban on 9 March 2018. He would go on to establish himself as a regular within the team and would play further forward as he scored 19 goals in the 2019 China League Two season as the club won the division title. After helping establish the club as a regular within the second division he would return to Qingdao, with the renamed Qingdao Hainiu on 13 April 2022. He would go on to make his debut in a league game on 14 June 2022 against Nanjing City in a 2-0 victory. He would go on to establish himself as regular within the team that gained promotion to the top tier at the end of the 2022 China League One campaign.

== Career statistics ==
Statistics accurate as of match played 31 December 2022.

| Club | Season | League | | | National Cup | | Continental | | Other | | Total | |
| Club | Season | Division | Apps | Goals | Apps | Goals | Apps | Goals | Apps | Goals | Apps | Goals |
|---|---|---|---|---|---|---|---|---|---|---|---|---|
| Qingdao Jonoon | 2010 | Chinese Super League | 4 | 0 | - | | - | | - | | 4 | 0 |
| Qingdao Jonoon | 2011 | Chinese Super League | 18 | 0 | 1 | 0 | - | | - | | 19 | 0 |
| Qingdao Jonoon | 2012 | Chinese Super League | 18 | 1 | 0 | 0 | - | | - | | 18 | 1 |
| Qingdao Jonoon | 2013 | Chinese Super League | 19 | 2 | 2 | 1 | - | | - | | 21 | 3 |
| Qingdao Jonoon | 2014 | China League One | 12 | 0 | 0 | 0 | - | | - | | 12 | 0 |
| Qingdao Jonoon | 2015 | China League One | 8 | 0 | 1 | 0 | - | | - | | 9 | 0 |
| Qingdao Jonoon | 2016 | China League One | 18 | 1 | 1 | 0 | - | | - | | 19 | 1 |
| Qingdao Jonoon | 2017 | China League Two | 20 | 11 | 2 | 0 | - | | - | | 22 | 11 |
| Qingdao Jonoon | Total | | 117 | 15 | 7 | 1 | 0 | 0 | 0 | 0 | 124 | 16 |
| Shenyang Urban | 2018 | China League Two | 25 | 9 | 2 | 0 | - | | - | | 27 | 9 |
| Shenyang Urban | 2019 | China League Two | 28 | 19 | 1 | 1 | - | | - | | 29 | 20 |
| Shenyang Urban | 2020 | China League One | 12 | 2 | - | | - | | - | | 12 | 2 |
| Shenyang Urban | 2021 | China League One | 18 | 2 | 0 | 0 | - | | - | | 18 | 2 |
| Shenyang Urban | Total | | 83 | 32 | 3 | 1 | 0 | 0 | 0 | 0 | 86 | 33 |
| Qingdao Hainiu | 2022 | China League One | 16 | 1 | 1 | 0 | - | | - | | 17 | 1 |
| Career total | | | 216 | 48 | 11 | 2 | 0 | 0 | 0 | 0 | 227 | 50 |

== Honours ==
=== Club ===
Shenyang Urban

- China League Two: 2019
