= Zhang Lifeng =

Chinese footballer

Zhang Lifeng 张利峰
Personal information
- Full name: Zhang Lifeng
- Date of birth: 24 January 1989 (age 37)
- Place of birth: Renqiu, Hebei, China
- Height: 1.75 m (5 ft 9 in)
- Position: Midfielder

Youth career
- Beijing Guoan
- 2004–2009: Luneng Taishan Football School

Senior career*
Years	Team	Apps	(Gls)
2010	Nanchang Hengyuan	4	(0)
2011	Guizhou Zhicheng	10	(0)
2012–2019	Hebei China Fortune	58	(12)
- * Club domestic league appearances and goals as of 4 November 2017

Zhang Lifeng (Chinese: 张利峰; born 24 January 1989) is a Chinese footballer who currently plays for Hebei China Fortune in the Chinese Super League.

== Club career ==
Zhang Lifeng started his professional football career in 2010 when he joined Nanchang Hengyuan for the 2010 Chinese Super League campaign. On 14 July 2010, he made his debut for Nanchang in the 2010 Chinese Super League against Liaoning Whowin, coming on as a substitute for Ji Jun in the 62nd minute. In March 2011, Zhang moved to another China League One club Guizhou Zhicheng.

In March 2012, he transferred to China League Two side Hebei Zhongji.

== Career statistics ==
Statistics accurate as of match played 4 November 2017.

Club performance			League		Cup		League Cup		Continental		Total	
Season	Club	League	Apps	Goals	Apps	Goals	Apps	Goals	Apps	Goals	Apps	Goals
China PR			League		FA Cup		CSL Cup		Asia		Total	
2010	Nanchang Hengyuan	Chinese Super League	4	0	-		-		-		4	0
2011	Guizhou Zhicheng	China League One	10	0	0	0	-		-		10	0
2012	Hebei China Fortune	China League Two	24	7	0	0	-		-		24	7
2013	Hebei China Fortune	China League Two	14	1	2	1	-		-		16	2
2014	Hebei China Fortune	China League One	0	0	1	0	-		-		1	0
2015	Hebei China Fortune	China League One	6	1	1	0	-		-		7	1
2016	Hebei China Fortune	Chinese Super League	9	1	4	1	-		-		13	2
2017	Hebei China Fortune	Chinese Super League	5	2	0	0	-		-		5	2
Total	China PR		72	12	8	2	0	0	0	0	80	14
