= Song Wenjie =

Chinese footballer

Song Wenjie 宋文杰
Personal information
- Full name: Song Wenjie
- Date of birth: 15 January 1991 (age 35)
- Place of birth: Qingdao, Shandong, China
- Height: 1.83 m (6 ft 0 in)
- Position: Striker

Team information
- Current team: Qingdao Hainiu
- Number: 19

Youth career
- 2002–2009: Qingdao Hailifeng
- 2010: Qingdao Jonoon

Senior career*
Years	Team	Apps	(Gls)
2010–2014	Qingdao Jonoon	99	(8)
2015–2018	Hebei China Fortune	27	(6)
2019–2020	Shandong Luneng	5	(0)
2020–2022	Guangzhou City	43	(9)
2023–	Qingdao Hainiu	65	(7)
- * Club domestic league appearances and goals as of 22 November 2026

Song Wenjie (simplified Chinese: 宋文杰; traditional Chinese: 宋文傑; pinyin: Sòng Wénjié; born 15 January 1991) is a Chinese professional footballer who currently plays for Chinese Super League club Qingdao Hainiu.

== Club career ==
Song Wenjie joined Qingdao Hailifeng's youth academy in 2002. In February 2010, Qingdao Hailifeng was engaged in bribery and private business dealings in matches held from 2007 to 2009 and was banned from all future league matches. Song and his teammates became unattached players without a club. After being released, he signed a contract with Chinese Super League side Qingdao Jonoon in March 2010 after a successful trial with the club.

=== Qingdao Jonoon ===
Song was promoted to Qingdao Jonoon's first team in the summer of 2010 and made his senior debut on 31 October 2010 in a 0–0 away draw against Shanghai Shenhua. Song was given further more opportunities to play for the senior team during the 2011 league season after then manager Chang Woe-Ryong took charge of the team. On 8 May 2011, he scored his first two senior goals in a 4–1 home win against Nanchang Hengyuan. Song scored 5 goals in 23 league appearances and won the Chinese Football Association Young Player of the Year award at the end of the 2011 season.

=== Hebei China Fortune ===
On 27 February 2015, Song transfer to China League One side Hebei China Fortune. He made his debut for the club on 14 March 2015 in a 1–0 home loss against Beijing Institute of Technology. On 15 April 2015, he scored his first goal in a 2–0 away win against Guangxi Longguida in the 2015 Chinese FA Cup. On 25 April 2015, Song scored his first league goal, earned a penalty and assisted once in a league match against Tianjin Songjiang, which ensured Hebei's 3–2 win. On 21 July 2015, he suffered a rupture of cruciate ligament in his right knee in a league match against Harbin Yiteng, which ruling him out of the field for the rest of the season. Song, who was recovering from injury, was named in Hebei China Fortune's reserves squad in the 2016 season. He returned to the first team squad in July 2017. He made his return on 24 September 2017 in a 0–0 away draw against Changchun Yatai, coming on as a substitute for Zhang Lifeng in the 71st minute.

=== Shandong Luneng ===
On 26 February 2019, Song transferred to Chinese Super League side Shandong Luneng. On 12 March 2019, he made his debut for the club in a 2-2 home draw against Kashima Antlers in the 2019 AFC Champions League group stage. Throughout the season he would struggle to establish himself as a regular within the team and only made eight appearances throughout the season.

=== Guangzhou R&F ===
On 12 September 2020, Song joined fellow top tier club Guangzhou R&F (later renamed as Guangzhou City from the 2021 season). On 13 September 2020, he scored on his debut for the club in a 3-3 draw against Jiangsu Suning.

=== Return to Qingdao Hainiu ===
On 23 March 2023, Song returned to Qingdao Hainiu(formerly named Qingdao Jonoon) after their promotion back to the Chinese Super League.

== Career statistics ==
Statistics accurate as of match played 22 November 2025.

Appearances and goals by club, season and competition
Club	Season	League			National Cup		Continental		Other		Total	
Club	Season	Division	Apps	Goals	Apps	Goals	Apps	Goals	Apps	Goals	Apps	Goals
Qingdao Jonoon	2010	Chinese Super League	2	0	-		-		-		2	0
Qingdao Jonoon	2011	Chinese Super League	23	5	0	0	-		-		23	5
Qingdao Jonoon	2012	Chinese Super League	26	0	2	1	-		-		28	1
Qingdao Jonoon	2013	Chinese Super League	21	1	3	1	-		-		24	2
Qingdao Jonoon	2014	China League One	27	2	3	0	-		-		30	2
Qingdao Jonoon	Total		99	8	8	2	0	0	0	0	107	10
Hebei China Fortune	2015	China League One	17	5	3	1	-		-		20	6
Hebei China Fortune	2017	Chinese Super League	2	0	0	0	-		-		2	0
Hebei China Fortune	2018	Chinese Super League	8	1	1	0	-		-		9	1
Hebei China Fortune	Total		27	6	4	1	0	0	0	0	31	7
Shandong Luneng	2019	Chinese Super League	2	0	0	0	6	0	-		8	0
Shandong Luneng	2020	Chinese Super League	3	0	0	0	-		-		3	0
Shandong Luneng	Total		5	0	0	0	6	0	0	0	11	0
Guangzhou R&F/ Guangzhou City	2020	Chinese Super League	8	1	3	2	-		-		11	3
Guangzhou R&F/ Guangzhou City	2021	Chinese Super League	12	3	0	0	-		-		12	3
Guangzhou R&F/ Guangzhou City	2022	Chinese Super League	23	5	0	0	-		-		23	5
Guangzhou R&F/ Guangzhou City	Total		43	9	3	2	0	0	0	0	46	11
Qingdao Hainiu	2023	Chinese Super League	21	3	3	0	-		-		24	3
Qingdao Hainiu	2024	Chinese Super League	9	0	0	0	-		-		9	0
Qingdao Hainiu	2025	Chinese Super League	14	1	1	0	-		-		15	1
Qingdao Hainiu	Total		44	4	4	0	0	0	0	0	48	4
Career total			218	27	19	5	6	0	0	0	243	32

== Honours ==
=== Individual ===
- Chinese Football Association Young Player of the Year: 2011
