= Dong Xuesheng =

Chinese footballer

Dong Xuesheng 董学升
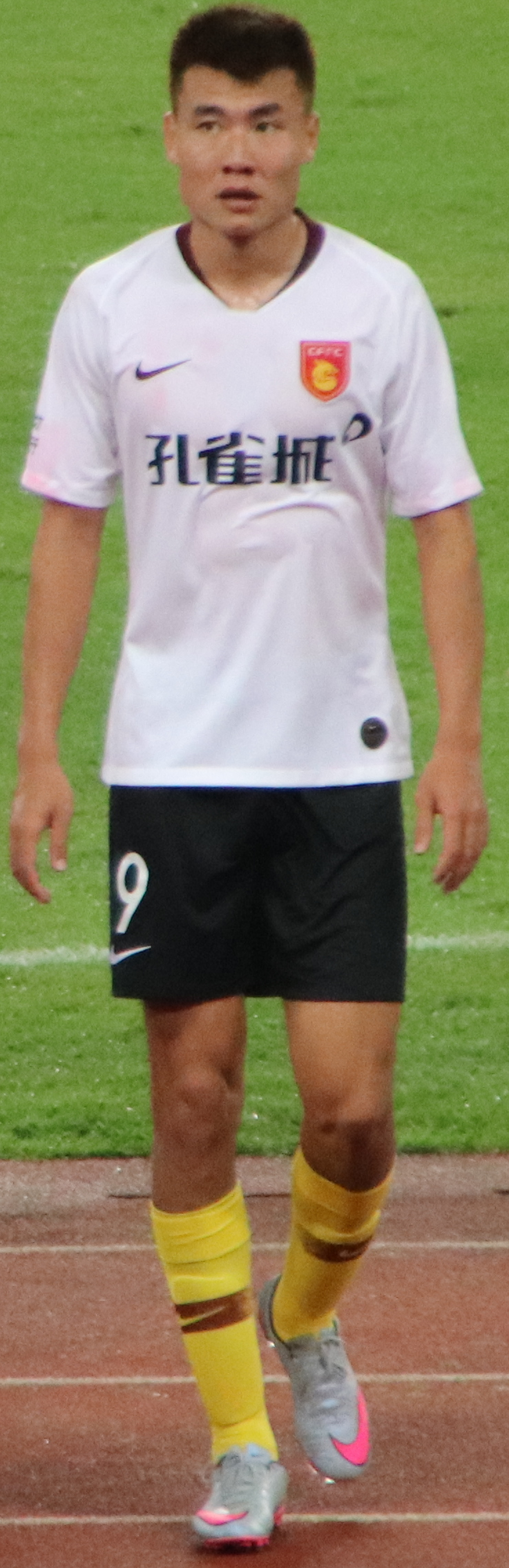
- playing for Hebei China Fortune, 2019

Personal information
- Full name: Dong Xuesheng
- Date of birth: 22 May 1989 (age 37)
- Place of birth: Dalian, Liaoning, China
- Height: 1.88 m (6 ft 2 in)
- Position: Striker

Team information
- Current team: Shenzhen Peng City (assistant coach)

Youth career
- 2006: Shanghai United
- 2007–2008: Shanghai Shenhua

Senior career*
Years	Team	Apps	(Gls)
2009–2011	Shanghai Shenhua	26	(2)
2011	→ Shenzhen Ruby (loan)	16	(5)
2012–2013	Dalian Aerbin	35	(4)
2014–2015	Guangzhou Evergrande	16	(5)
2016–2020	Hebei China Fortune	102	(35)
2020	→ Wuhan Zall (loan)	9	(0)
2021–2022	Wuhan Yangtze River	20	(0)
2022	Shaanxi Chang'an Athletic (loan)	7	(0)

International career^{‡}
2011–2012	China U-23		
2014–2019	China	8	(1)

Managerial career
- 2024–2025: China U-19 (trainer)
- 2026–: Shenzhen Peng City (assistant)
Medal record
Representing China
Men's football
EAFF Championship
Bronze medal – third place	2019 South Korea	Team
- * Club domestic league appearances and goals as of 2 May 2022 ‡ National team caps and goals as of 18 December 2019

Dong Xuesheng (Chinese: 董学升; pinyin: Dǒng Xuéshēng; Mandarin pronunciation: [tʊ̀ŋ ɕɥě ʂə́ŋ]; born 22 May 1989) is a Chinese former professional footballer.

== Club career ==
Dong Xuesheng was promoted from Shanghai Shenhua's youth academy in the 2009 league season and made his debut on 7 April 2009 in a 2-1 win against Suwon Samsung Bluewings in an AFC Champions League game as a substitute for Mao Jianqing. He made his league debut against Shenzhen Asia Travel on 17 April 2009 in a 4-1 win. For the rest of the season, he became a squad regular where he was used mainly as substitute and eventually scored his first goal on 31 October 2009 in a 2-1 league victory against Changsha Ginde.

However, after Xi Zhikang became the new manager in the 2011 league season, Dong spent most of his time in the reserves and was loaned out to Shenzhen Ruby for the rest of the season. He made his debut for Shenzhen on 10 July 2011 in a 2-1 loss against Tianjin Teda where he came on as a substitute for Liu Chao. He scored his first hat trick of his career on 21 August 2011 in a 4-2 win against Dalian Shide. He scored five goals in 16 appearances for Shenzhen, but the club finished last in the league and was relegated to the second tier. In November 2011, Dong transferred to Dalian Aerbin after they were promoted from the second tier.

In February 2014, Dong received a trial with Chinese Super League side Guangzhou R&F and was believed to be signing with the club. However, on 28 February 2014, the final day of 2014 winter transfer window, he suddenly transferred to crosstown rivals Guangzhou Evergrande. On 8 March 2014, he scored his first goal for the club on his debut in a 3-0 win against Henan Jianye. Dong scored five goals in nine matches for Guangzhou at the beginning of 2014 season. However, he suffered a serious injury in a league match against Shanghai Shenxin on 3 May 2014, ruling him out for one month. He failed to establish himself within the first team again after he returned to field in July 2014.

On 25 February 2016, Dong transferred to Chinese Super League newcomer Hebei China Fortune. On 4 March 2016, he made his debut for Hebei in a 2–1 away win against Guangzhou R&F. He scored his first goal for Hebei in a Hebei Derby against Shijiazhuang Ever Bright. Dong scored seven goals in his first nine matches for the club. However, his scoring rate fell in the rest of the season after his strike partners Gervinho and Ezequiel Lavezzi struggled with injury. Dong finally scored nine goals in 26 appearances in the 2016 league season.

== Coaching career ==
In March 2026, Dong was named as assistant coach of Chinese Super League club Shenzhen Peng City.

== International career ==
Dong was called up to the Chinese under-23 national team in 2011 where he was reunited with his previous manager from Shanghai Shenhua, Miroslav Blažević. He made his debut on 6 June 2011 in a 0-0 draw against Saudi Arabia. He was then part of the squad which took part during the 2012 Summer Olympics qualification where China was knocked out by Oman in a 4-1 aggregate defeat.

Dong made his debut for the Chinese national team on 18 June 2014 in a 2-0 win against Macedonia, coming on as a substitute for Gao Lin. On 10 December 2019, Dong scored his first international goal in a 1-2 defeat to Japan in the 2019 EAFF E-1 Football Championship.

== Career statistics ==
=== Club ===
As of 31 December 2021

Appearances and goals by club, season and competition
Club	Season	League			National Cup		Continental		Other		Total	
Club	Season	Division	Apps	Goals	Apps	Goals	Apps	Goals	Apps	Goals	Apps	Goals
Shanghai Shenhua	2009	Chinese Super League	7	1	-		4	0	-		11	1
Shanghai Shenhua	2010	Chinese Super League	18	1	-		-		-		18	1
Shanghai Shenhua	2011	Chinese Super League	1	0	0	0	1	0	-		2	0
Shanghai Shenhua	Total		26	2	0	0	5	0	0	0	31	2
Shenzhen Ruby (loan)	2011	Chinese Super League	16	5	0	0	-		-		16	5
Dalian Aerbin	2012	Chinese Super League	17	2	1	0	-		-		18	2
Dalian Aerbin	2013	Chinese Super League	18	2	5	1	-		-		23	3
Dalian Aerbin	Total		35	4	6	1	0	0	0	0	41	5
Guangzhou Evergrande	2014	Chinese Super League	9	5	2	0	1	0	0 (Note: Appearance(s) in Chinese FA Super Cup)	0	12	5
Guangzhou Evergrande	2015	Chinese Super League	7	0	1	0	1	0	0	0	9	0
Guangzhou Evergrande	Total		16	5	3	0	2	0	0	0	21	5
Hebei China Fortune	2016	Chinese Super League	26	9	1	0	-		-		27	9
Hebei China Fortune	2017	Chinese Super League	19	2	2	1	-		-		21	3
Hebei China Fortune	2018	Chinese Super League	21	12	0	0	-		-		21	12
Hebei China Fortune	2019	Chinese Super League	29	10	1	0	-		-		30	10
Hebei China Fortune	2020	Chinese Super League	7	2	0	0	-		-		7	2
Hebei China Fortune	Total		102	35	4	1	0	0	0	0	106	36
Wuhan Zall (loan)	2020	Chinese Super League	9	0	3	1	-		1 (Note: Appearance(s) in CSL Relegation play-offs)	0	13	1
Wuhan Zall	2021	Chinese Super League	10	0	2	2	-		-		12	2
Career total			214	51	18	5	7	0	1	0	240	56

=== International ===
National team
Year	Apps	Goals
2014	3	0
2015	0	0
2016	0	0
2017	0	0
2018	0	0
2019	5	1
Total	8	1

As of 10 December 2019
Scores and results list China's goal tally first.

No	Date	Venue	Opponent	Score	Result	Competition
1.	10 December 2019	Busan Gudeok Stadium, Busan, South Korea	Japan	1–2	1–2	2019 EAFF E-1 Football Championship

== Honours ==
=== Club ===
Guangzhou Evergrande

- Chinese Super League: 2014, 2015
