= Liang Yanfeng =

Chinese footballer (born 1987)

Liang Yanfeng 梁岩峰
Personal information
- Date of birth: 18 April 1987 (age 39)
- Place of birth: Shenyang, Liaoning, China
- Height: 1.80 m (5 ft 11 in)
- Position: Midfielder

Youth career
- Changsha Ginde

Senior career*
Years	Team	Apps	(Gls)
2007–2014	Guangzhou R&F	50	(1)
2013	→ Shenyang Dongjin (loan)	5	(1)
2014	→ Nanjing Qianbao (loan)	9	(1)
2015	Fujian Broncos	13	(2)
2016–2017	Guizhou Zhicheng	3	(0)
2018–2019	Yanbian Beiguo	42	(3)
2020–2022	Dongguan United	35	(3)
- * Club domestic league appearances and goals as of 12 October 2019

Liang Yanfeng (Chinese: 梁岩峰; pinyin: Liáng Yánfēng; born 18 April 1987) was a Chinese football player.

== Club career ==
Liang joined Changsha Ginde youth team system in the early year and was promoted to first team squad in 2007. He made his league debut on 4 October 2007, in a 2–0 away defeat against Shanghai Shenhua. He became a regular player in the second half of the 2010 league season, however, Changsha Ginde finished the bottom of the league and relegation to China League One. In February 2011, the club moved to Shenzhen as the club's name changed into Shenzhen Phoenix, Liang chose to stay in the club. On 5 May, he scored his first senior goal in a 2011 Chinese FA Cup match which Shenzhen Phoenix beat Shenyang Dongjin 3–0. The club were bought by Chinese property developers Guangzhou R&F and moved to Guangzhou in June and won promotion back to the Super League at the first attempt. Liang made 15 appearances in the 2011 league season.

In July 2013, Liang was to China League Two side Shenyang Dongjin until 31 December. In July 2014, he was loaned to China League Two side Nanjing Qianbao until 31 December. In March 2015, Liang transferred to China League Two side Fujian Broncos. In March 2016, Liang transferred to China League One side Guizhou Zhicheng. On 11 January 2018, Liang transferred to China League Two side Yanbian Beiguo.

== Career statistics ==
Statistics accurate as of match played 12 October 2019.

Club performance			League		Cup		League Cup		Continental		Total	
Season	Club	League	Apps	Goals	Apps	Goals	Apps	Goals	Apps	Goals	Apps	Goals
China PR			League		FA Cup		CSL Cup		Asia		Total	
2007	Guangzhou R&F	Chinese Super League	3	0	-		-		-		3	0
2008	Guangzhou R&F	Chinese Super League	2	0	-		-		-		2	0
2009	Guangzhou R&F	Chinese Super League	0	0	-		-		-		0	0
2010	Guangzhou R&F	Chinese Super League	17	0	-		-		-		17	0
2011	Guangzhou R&F	China League One	15	0	2	1	-		-		17	1
2012	Guangzhou R&F	Chinese Super League	11	1	0	0	-		-		11	1
2013	Guangzhou R&F	Chinese Super League	2	0	0	0	-		-		2	0
2013	Shenyang Dongjin	China League Two	5	1	-		-		-		5	1
2014	Guangzhou R&F	Chinese Super League	0	0	0	0	-		-		0	0
2014	Nanjing Qianbao	China League Two	9	1	-		-		-		9	1
2015	Fujian Broncos	China League Two	13	2	1	0	-		-		14	2
2016	Guizhou Zhicheng	China League One	3	0	1	0	-		-		4	0
2017	Guizhou Zhicheng	Chinese Super League	0	0	0	0	-		-		0	0
2018	Yanbian Beiguo	China League Two	25	1	4	0	-		-		29	1
2019	Yanbian Beiguo	China League Two	17	2	1	0	-		-		18	2
Total	China PR		122	8	9	1	0	0	0	0	131	9
