= List of CFA-AFC Professional Coaches =

CFA-AFC Professional Coach, formally Chinese Football Association–Asian Football Confederation Professional Coach, is the football coach registered with the Chinese Football Association and holding the AFC Professional Coaching Diploma, which is the highest level of coaching accreditation issued by the Asian Football Confederation.

On 2 June 2019, Chinese Football Association accepted professional qualification certificate of AFC Coach Convention issued by AFC president Salman Bin Ibrahim Al-Khalifa. According to the regulations of the convention, the Chinese Football Association will have the right to organize professional training courses, issue AFC coaching level certificates and diplomas.

The CFA-AFC Professional Coaches Diploma is valid for two years. Coaches whose diplomas have expired need to complete retraining to extend their qualifications, otherwise will lose their professional coaching qualifications. As of December 2019, the Chinese Football Association had a total of 89 qualified professional coaches.

== Professional coaches ==
=== Expire in 2021 ===
As of 21 June 2019.

Former national team player

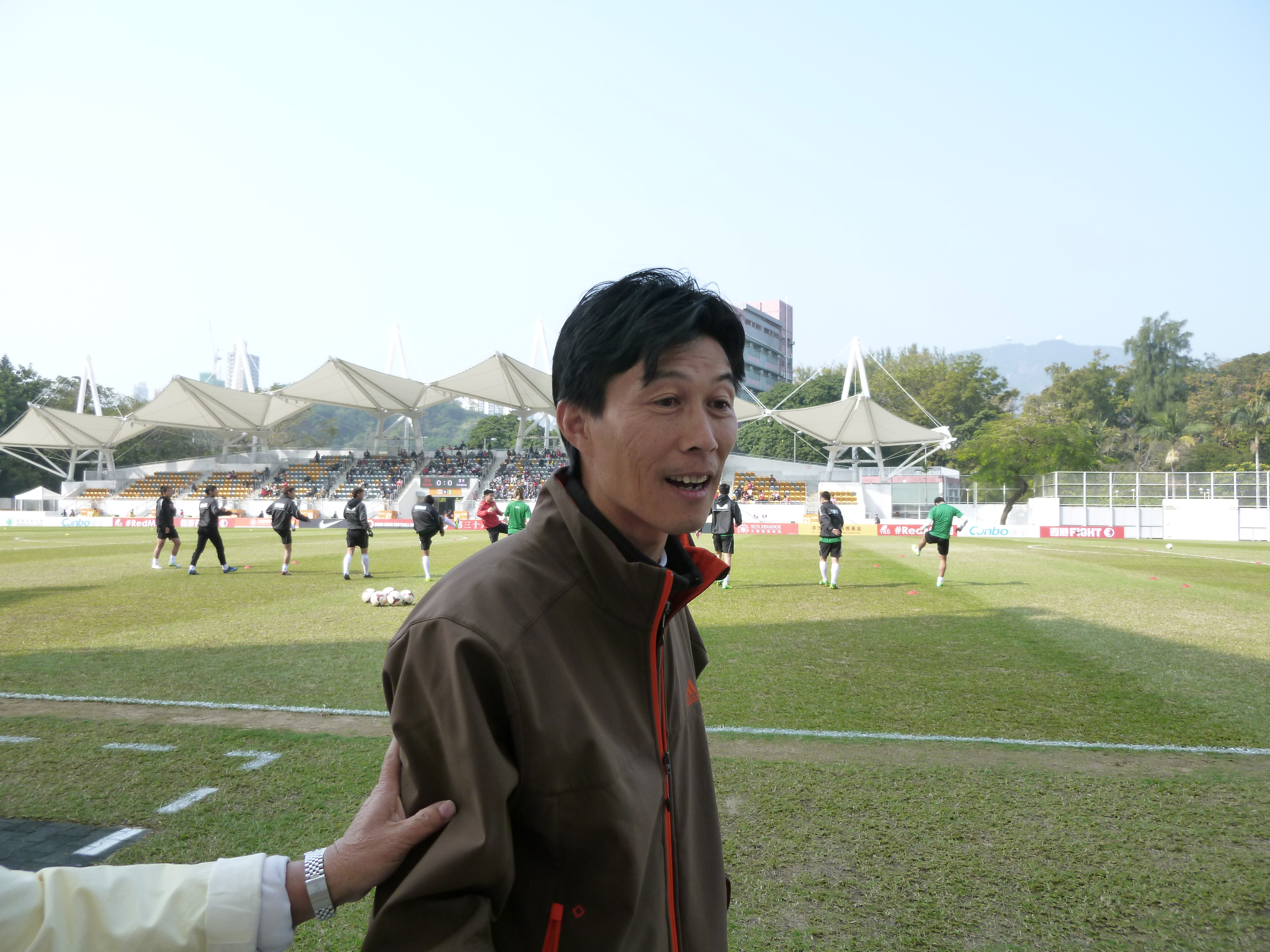
Ou Chuliang is one of the few Chinese goalkeepers to gain a Pro-Diploma.

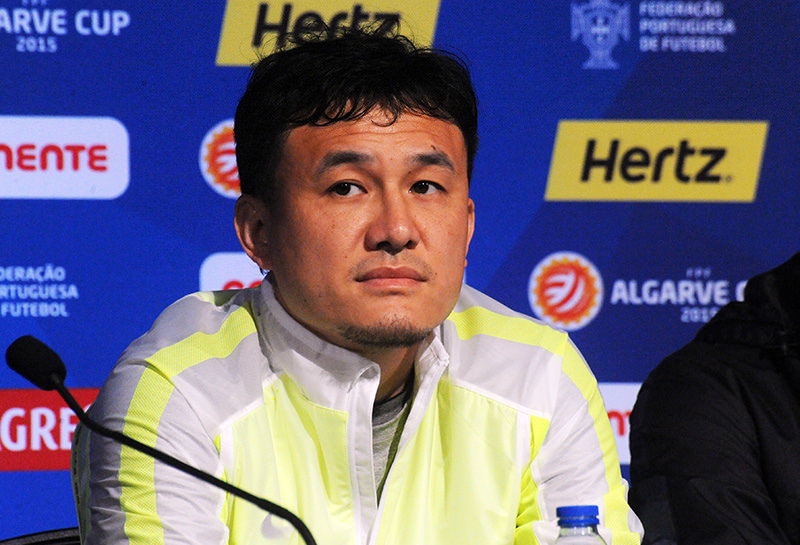
Hao Wei gained the Pro-Diploma in 2011. He participated the 2015 FIFA World Cup as the head coach of China.

Name (Birth)	Association	Gender	First certificate	Retraining	Diploma validity	Professional club / national team manager
Huang Yong (1978)	China	M	2013	2018	December 2021	Shenyang Shenbei (2012) (caretaker); Jiangxi Liansheng (2019–present)
Zhang Xu (1967)	China	M	2009	2018	December 2021	Beijing Hongdeng (2002–2009); Hunan Billows (2010–2012; 2014; 2017); Hunan Billows (2015) (caretaker)
Wang Jun (1976)	China	M	2011	2018	December 2021	Tianjin Huisen Ladies (2012); China women's U-20 (2013–2017); China women's U-18 (2019–present)
Li Jun (1967)	China	M	2010	2018	December 2021	Hubei Luyin (2009–2010); Hubei China-Kyle / Xinjiang Tianshan Leopard (2012–2018)
Zhang Tong (1984)	China	F	2018		December 2021	
Wang Bo (1970)	China	M	2012	2018	December 2021	Nei Mongol Zhongyou (2014–2017); Shenyang Urban (2018); Nei Mongol Zhongyou (2018); Shaanxi Chang'an Athletic (2019); Beijing Renhe (2019–present)
Li Wei (1975)	China	M	2016	2018	December 2021	
Wang Qiang (1982)	China	M	2018		December 2021	
Ou Chuliang (1968)	China	M	2018		December 2021	
Sui Yong (1980)	China	M	2018		December 2021	
Zhao Junzhe (1979)	China	M	2018		December 2021	Liaoning F.C. (2017) (caretaker)
Xie Nan (1981)	China	F	2018		December 2021	
Li Guoxu (1978)	China	M	2018		December 2021	Dalian Transcendence (2017–2018)
Xie Hui (1975)	China	M	2018		December 2021	
Yu Yuanwei (1974)	China	M	2018		December 2021	China U-15 (2016)
Wang Kun (1985)	China	F	2018		December 2021	
Liu Yujian (1979)	China	M	2018		December 2021	
Hou Zhiqiang (1976)	China	M	2014	2018	December 2021	Zibo Cuju (2018–present)
Ma Quan (1977)	China	M	2016	2018	December 2021	
Liu Hua'na (1981)	China	M	2016	2018	December 2021	Shaanxi Ladies (2014–2017)
Li Yao (1977)	China	M	2016	2018	December 2021	
Qian Ding (1986)	China	M	2016	2018	December 2021	Shandong Ladies (2016–2017)
Sun Xiaoxuan (1980)	China	M	2016	2018	December 2021	Sichuan Ladies
Wang Xiao (1978)	China	M	2016	2018	December 2021	
Zheng Xiaotian (1962)	China	M	2016	2018	December 2021	Meizhou Hakka (2018)
Cheng Liang (1977)	China	M	2014	2018	December 2021	Shanghai Sunfun (2016–2017); Sichuan Jiuniu (2018); Yunnan Kunlu (2019)
Hu Yijun (1970)	China	M	2014	2018	December 2021	Shandong Youth (2011–2012)
Zhai Biao (1968)	China	M	2014	2018	December 2021	Sichuan F.C. (2006–2008)
Zhang Biao (1971)	China	M	2014	2018	December 2021	Pu'er Wanhao (2014–2015); Yunnan Flying Tigers (2016; 2017); Lhasa Urban Construction Investment (2018–2019)
Su Maozhen (1972)	China	M	2009	2018	December 2021	China U-20 (2009–2011); China U-16 (2011–2012); Qingdao Hainiu (2013–2015); Qingdao Jonoon (2016)
Wei Kexing (1963)	China	M	2009	2018	December 2021	Beijing Guoan (2000–2002); Beijing Guoan (2003–2004) (executive); Beijing Guoan (2010) (caretaker)
Lü Jun (1968)	China	M	2011	2018	December 2021	
Gao Fei (1973)	China	M	2013	2018	December 2021	
Men Wenfeng (1963)	China	M	2010	2018	December 2021	Henan Construction (2002; 2006–2007); Hunan Billows (2009); Henan Ladies (2011) (caretaker); Henan Ladies (2013–2017)
Yang Weijian (1964)	China	M	2011	2018	December 2021	Qingdao Etsong Hainiu (1999) (caretaker); Qingdao Jonoon (2012) (caretaker)
Hao Qi (1976)	China	M	2013	2018	December 2021	
Wang Xuedong (1978)	China	M	2013	2018	December 2021	
Niu Hongli (1967)	China	M	2011	2018	December 2021	Lijiang Jiayunhao (2013); Chengdu Tiancheng (2014); Shenyang Urban (2018)
Wang Baoshan (1963)	China	M	2010	2018	December 2021	Foshan Fosti (1995–1997); Yunnan Hongta (1998); China U-20 (2001–2002); Guangdong Xiongying (2003–2004); Jiangsu Sainty (2005); Shenzhen Jianlibao (2005–2006); Chengdu Blades (2009–2010; 2012); Chongqing Lifan (2013–2015); Guizhou Renhe (2016–2017); Shenzhen F.C. (2017–2018); Henan Jianye (2018–present)
Jia Xiuquan (1963)	China	M	2004	2018	December 2021	Bayi (1994–1995); Shaanxi National Power (1996–1998); China U-17 (1999); Bayi (2001–2002); China U-23 (2003–2004; 2005–2007); Shanghai Shenhua (2004) (caretaker); Henan Jianye (2008; 2014–2017); Shanghai Shenhua (2008–2009); China U-20 (2017); China women (2018–present)
Wang Helong (1964)	China	M	2013	2018	December 2021	Harbin Yiteng (2014)
Liu Zhiyu (1985)	China	M	2012	2018	December 2021	
Wei Shili (1956)	China	M	2006	2018	December 2021	Xi'an Anxinyuan (2004) (caretaker); Gansu Zhongyou (2005)
Zhao Changhong (1972)	China	M	2009	2018	December 2021	Shaanxi National Power (2004); Anhui Jiufang (2005–2006; 2007–2010); Chongqing Ladies (2011–2012); Chongqing F.C. (2012–2013); Baoding Yingli ETS (2016–2017); Shaanxi Chang'an Athletic (2018); Yinchuan Helanshan (2019–present)
Li Zhi (1966)	China	M	2012	2018	December 2021	
Yang Ji (1973)	China	M	2011	2018	December 2021	Wenzhou Provenza (2011); Hangzhou Greentown (2014; 2015)
Zhu Jinxing (1966)	China	M	2013	2018	December 2021	China U-14 (2009)
Fu Bo (1965)	China	M	2011	2018	December 2021	China U-23 (2012–2016); China (2013–2014) (caretaker); Guangdong South China Tiger (2018–2019)
Huang Chuanhong (1968)	China	M	2011	2018	December 2021	
Guo Guangqi (1965)	China	M	2013	2018	December 2021	Yunnan Tianyuan (1997); Xi'an Anxinyuan (2005); Shanghai Shenxin (2013; 2014–2015) (caretaker); Henan Jianye (2017) (caretaker)
Shen Kui (1968)	China	M	2014	2018	December 2021	
Zhang Ning (1968)	China	M	2009	2018	December 2021	Beijing Yunsi (1996–1998); China U-17 (2003–2005; 2007–2010); Beijing Institute of Technology (2010); Guangxi (2011); Guizhou Zhicheng (2011–2012)
Chen Sing-an (1962)	Chinese Taipei	M	2013	2018	December 2021	Chinese Taipei U-23 (1999–2000); Chinese Taipei (2008–2009); Chinese Taipei women (2010); Chinese Taipei U-18 (2011–2013)
Chen Bo (1974)	China	M	2012	2018	December 2021	Shenyang Dongjin (2011–2012); Dalian Chanjoy (2016–2017)
Zhao Tuqiang (1963)	China	M	2012	2018	December 2021	Fujian Broncos (2014); Fujian Tianxin (2017–present)
Li Xinqi (1973)	China	M	2010	2018	December 2021	
Zhang Haitao (1970)	China	M	2003	2018	December 2021	China women (2003–2004); China U-17 (2013–2014)
Deng Shijun (1972)	China	M	2011	2018	December 2021	
Cheng Yaodong (1967)	China	M	2009	2018	December 2021	Shanghai COSCO Huili / Shaanxi Chanba (2003–2009); Shanghai Zobon (2011–2012); Shanghai Shenxin (2014); China U-20 (2018–present)
Chen Yang (1977)	China	M	2011	2018	December 2021	Liaoning F.C. (2014–2015); China U-23 (2016–2017); Wuhan Zall (2017); Liaoning F.C. (2018); Inner Mongolia Zhongyou (2019–present)
Zhao Xudong (1965)	China	M	2011	2018	December 2021	
Zhu Bo (1960)	China	M	2009	2018	December 2021	Wuhan Hongtao K (1999) (caretaker); Hunan Shoking (2004); Yunnan Lijiang Dongba (2005); Nanchang Bayi Hengyuan (2006); Changsha Ginde (2008–2009); Shenzhen Fengpeng (2013); Yinchuan Helanshan (2015)
Xu Tao (1965)	China	M	2009	2018	December 2021	
Zhou Sui'an (1961)	China	M	2004	2018	December 2021	Guangzhou Apollo (1990–1995); Shenzhen Feiyada (1996); Shenzhen Kinspar / Yunnan Hongta (1997–1998); Guangzhou F.C. (1999–2003); Nanjing Yoyo (2003–2004); Nanchang Bayi Hengyuan (2005–2006); Hangzhou Sanchao (2006–2007; 2008); Hangzhou Greentown (2007; 2008–2009)
Gao Fulin (1972)	China	M	2011	2018	December 2021	Dali Ruilong (2013)
Ma Lin (1962)	China	M	2004	2018	December 2021	Liaoning F.C. (2003–2004; 2008–2013; 2015–2017); Chongqing Lifan (2005); Jiangsu Sainty (2006); Dalian Aerbin (2014) (caretaker); Dalian Yifang (2017–2018)
Liu Junwei (1976)	China	M	2013	2018	December 2021	Shanghai Shenxin (2015); China U-17 (2017–2018); Suzhou Dongwu (2019–present)
Huang Xingsheng (1966)	China	M	2013	2018	December 2021	
Tang Yaodong (1962)	China	M	2009	2018	December 2021	Liaoning Xingguang (2002); Liaoning F.C. (2005–2007); Henan Construction (2008–2010; 2013–2014); Chongqing Lifan (2012); Shenzhen F.C. (2016); Wuhan Zall (2017)
Li Zheng (1962)	China	M	2012	2018	December 2021	Shenyang Zhongze (2014) (caretaker)
Zheng Xiong (1966)	China	M	2013	2018	December 2021	China U-17 (2005–2006); Hubei CTGU Kangtian (2009); Wuhan Zall (2012–2013; 2015–2016); China U-20 (2014) (caretaker); Zhejiang Greentown (2019–present)
Hao Wei (1976)	China	M	2011	2018	December 2021	Changsha Ginde (2009–2010); China women (2012–2015); China U-23 (2019) (caretaker)
Gao Hong (1967)	China	F	2013	2018	December 2021	China women's U-16 (2013–2017)
Liu Ying (1974)	China	F	2011	2018	December 2021	Beijing Enterprises Group Phoenix (2014–2017)
Shen Xiangfu (1957)	China	M	2009	2018	December 2021	Fujitsu (1994–1995); Beijing Guoan (1997–1998; 2005–2006); China U-20 (2000–2001); China (2001–2002) (caretaker); China U-23 (2002–2004); Guangzhou Pharmaceutical (2007–2009); Changchun Yatai (2010–2011); Henan Jianye (2012); Shanghai Shenhua (2013–2014); CF Cracks (2015); Atlético Museros (2016–2017); Tianjin Quanjian (2018) (caretaker); Tianjin Tianhai (2019)
Liu Xueyu (1962)	China	M	2005	2018	December 2021	Tianjin Ladies (2007–2009)
Yu Ming (1971)	China	M	2010	2018	December 2021	Shenyang Dongjin (2010–2011); Shenyang Urban (2019–present)
Li Bing (1969)	China	M	2009	2018	December 2021	Zhejiang Green Town (2003) (caretaker); Chengdu Blades (2007–2009); China U-20 (2013–2014); Guangzhou R&F (2013; 2015) (caretaker); Guizhou Zhicheng (2016–2017) (caretaker); Sichuan Longfor (2017–present)
Li Chunman (1962)	China	M	2009	2018	December 2021	Guizhou Renhe (2015) (caretaker)
Wang Shaolei (1971)	China	M	2011	2018	December 2021	
Gao Hongbo (1966)	China	M	2004	2018	December 2021	Guangzhou Matsunichi (1999); China U-17 (2000); Xiamen Hongshi (2004–2006); Changchun Yatai (2007–2008); China (2009–2011); Guizhou Renhe (2011–2012); Shanghai SIPG (2013); Jiangsu Sainty (2013–2015); China (2016); Beijing Sport University (2017–present)
Sun Jun (1975)	China	M	2017	2018	December 2021	
Cui Enlang (1981)	China	M	2018		December 2021	Beijing Baxy (2012)
Du Ping (1978)	China	M	2018		December 2021	
Tang Tian (1977)	China	M	2018		December 2021	
Zhang Li (1987)	China	M	2018		December 2021	China U-18 (2019) (caretaker)
Xu Jianye (1971)	China	M	2018		December 2021	
Ye Zhibin (1972)	China	M	2010	2018	December 2021	Guangzhou City Transport (2011)
Yang Xiaolei (1971)	China	M	2005	2018	December 2021	

=== Expired in 2019 ===
As of 21 June 2019.

Former national team player

Name (Birth)	Association	Gender	First certificate	Retraining	Diploma validity	Professional club / national team manager
Huang Yan (1968)	China	M	2014	2017	December 2019	Tianjin Songjiang (2009–2010); Hebei Zhongji (2013); Jiangxi Liansheng (2015); Yunnan Flying Tigers (2018)
Li Yi (1979)	China	M	2015	2017	December 2019	Shenzhen Ruby (2013–2015)
Yang Chen (1974)	China	M	2015	2017	December 2019	
Li Gang (1975)	China	M	2015	2017	December 2019	
Wang Lin (1972)	China	M	2017		December 2019	
Piao Junjie (1970)	China	M	2017		December 2019	
Tao Jianming (1974)	China	M	2017		December 2019	
Wang Benxin (1975)	China	M	2017		December 2019	
Zhang Yuning (1976)	China	M	2017		December 2019	
Zhao Bin (1978)	China	M	2017		December 2019	
Zhao Lichun (1968)	China	M	2017		December 2019	
He Qihong (1968)	China	M	2017		December 2019	
Wang Wenhua (1977)	China	M	2017		December 2019	
Zhang Xiaofeng (1981)	China	M	2017		December 2019	
Zhang Xiuping (1976)	China	F	2017		December 2019	
Dai Zhenpeng (1973)	China	M	2017		December 2019	
Shui Qingxia (1966)	China	F	2014	2017	December 2019	Shanghai Rural Commercial Bank Ladies (present)
Wang Youhe (1969)	China	M	2014	2017	December 2019	
Li Tie (1977)	China	M	2015	2017	December 2019	Hebei China Fortune (2015–2016); Wuhan Zall (2017–2019); China (2019–present)
Li Jinyu (1977)	China	M	2015	2017	December 2019	Shenyang Shenbei (2013–2014); Shijiazhuang Ever Bright (2016) (caretaker); Jiangsu Suning (2017) (caretaker)
Ma Yongkang (1977)	China	M	2015	2017	December 2019	
Chang Weiwei (1974)	China	M	2015	2017	December 2019	
Lu Xin (1974)	China	M	2015	2017	December 2019	
Ren Dingmeng (1979)	China	M	2015	2017	December 2019	
Li Sheng (1978)	China	M	2015	2017	December 2019	Sichuan Longfor (2019) (caretaker)
Li Xiao (1968)	China	M	2015	2017	December 2019	Nanchang Bayi Hengyuan (2004–2005; 2006–2008); Hubei Wuhan Zhongbo (2011); Jiangxi Liansheng (2012–2015); Hainan Boying & Seamen (2016); Zhenjiang Huasa (2017)
Tang Jing (1975)	China	M	2015	2017	December 2019	Jiangsu Suning (2016) (caretaker); Zhenjiang Huasa (2018); Hunan Billows (2019–present)
Li Haijun (1978)	China	M	2015	2017	December 2019	Heilongjiang Lava Spring (2018–present)
Liu You (1963)	China	M	2004	2017	December 2019	Changchun Dazhong Zhuoyue Ladies (2010–present)
Pei Yongjiu (1962)	China	M	2004	2017	December 2019	Dalian Shide Siwu (2008)
Li Xiaopeng (1975)	China	M	2010	2017	December 2019	China women (2011–2012); Qingdao Jonoon (2014); Shandong Luneng (2018–present)
Hu Yijun (1963)	China	M	2009	2017	December 2019	China Three Gorges University (2008–2009); Sichuan Leaders (2014)
Chen Jin'gang (1958)	China	M	2011	2017	December 2019	Tianjin TEDA (1997); China U-20 (1998); Changchun Yatai (2004–2006; 2017–2019)
Sun Wei (1964)	China	M	2011	2017	December 2019	Dalian Changbo (2004); Hangzhou Greentown (2008); China U-23 (2010); Jiangxi Liansheng (2015); Yinchuan Helanshan (2017); Hunan Billows (2018)
Yu Genwei (1974)	China	M	2012	2017	December 2019	
Liu Pingyu (1954)	China	M	2004	2017	December 2019	Jiangsu Maint / Jiangsu Sainty (1995–1996; 2002)
Fan Zhiyi (1970)	China	M	2010	2017	December 2019	Suzhou Trips (2007); Shanghai East Asia (2010)
Wu Jingui (1961)	China	M	2004	2018	December 2019	Shanghai Shenhua (2002–2003; 2006; 2007–2008; 2017–2018); Hangzhou Greentown (2009–2011); Shandong Luneng (2012) (caretaker)

== See also ==
- AFC Professional Coaching Diploma
- Chinese Football Association
- Asian Football Confederation
