= 2015 China League Two =

China League Two
- Season: 2015
- Champions: Meizhou Kejia (1st title)
- Promoted: Meizhou Kejia; Dalian Transcendence
- Matches: 126
- Goals: 356 (2.83 per match)
- Top goalscorer: Liu Yang (12 goals)
- Biggest home win: Meizhou Kejia 10-0 Fujian Broncos (Aug. 22nd, 2015) (10 goals)
- Biggest away win: Fujian Broncos 0-7 Anhui Litian Huishang (Jul. 11th, 2015) (7 goals)
- Highest scoring: Dalian Transcendence 10-1 Shenyang Dongjin (Jun. 13th, 2015) (11 goals)

The 2015 Chinese Football Association Division Two League season was the 26th season since its establishment in 1989. It was divided into two groups, North and South. There were 16 teams participating in the league, 8 teams in North Group and 8 teams in South Group. The league was made up of two stages, the group stage and the play-off. The group stage was a double round-robin format. Each team in the group will play the other teams twice, home and away.

== Team changes ==
=== Promotion and relegation ===
Teams promoted to 2015 China League One

- Jiangxi Liansheng
- Taiyuan Zhongyou Jiayi
- Guizhou Zhicheng

Teams relegated from 2014 China League One

- Chengdu Tiancheng

Teams promoted from 2014 China Amateur Football League

- Anhui Litian
- Baoding Yingli ETS
- Baotou Nanjiao
- Guangxi Longguida

=== Dissolved entries ===
- Chengdu Tiancheng
- Shandong Tengding
- Sichuan Leaders

=== Name changes ===
Pu'er Wanhao was renamed Yunnan Wanhao.

== Clubs ==
Groups	Club	Head coach	City	Stadium	Capacity	2014 season
North	Nanjing Qianbao	(China) Zhao Faqing	Nanjing	Wutaishan Stadium	18,500	North, 2nd
North	Dalian Transcendence	(China) Liu Zhongchang	Dalian	Jinzhou Stadium	30,776	North, 3rd
North	Yinchuan Helanshan	(China) Zhu Bo	Yinchuan	Helan Mountain Stadium	39,872	North, 4th
North	Shenyang Dongjin	(China) Li Wei	Shenyang	Shenyang Urban Construction University Stadium	12,000	North, 5th
North	Hebei Elite	(Spain) Juan Carlos Añón	Qinhuangdao	Qinhuangdao Olympic Sports Center Stadium	33,572	North, 6th
North	Tianjin Huochetou	(China) Su Wei	Tianjin	Tianjin Huochetou Stadium	12,000	North, 7th
North	Baotou Nanjiao ^{P}	(China) Xu Hui	Baotou	Baotou Olympic Sports Center Stadium	40,545	CAL, 10th
North	Baoding Yingli ETS ^{P}	(China) Fan Yuhong	Baoding	Baoding Foreign Language School Stadium	N/A	CAL North, 5th
South	Meizhou Kejia	(China) Qi Wusheng	Wuhua	Wuhua County Stadium	6,800	CL2, 4th
South	Lijiang Jiayunhao	(China) Wang Zheng	Lijiang	Lijiang Sports Development Centre Stadium	20,000	South, 4th
South	Meixian Hakka	(China) Wang Hongwei	Meizhou	Meixian Tsang Hin-chi Stadium	20,221	South, 5th
South	Sichuan Longfor	(China) Jia Jin	Santai	Santai County Stadium	8,000	South, 6th
South	Yunnan Wanhao	(China) Zhang Biao	Pu'er (playing in Kunming)	Hongta Sport Center	N/A	South, 8th
South	Fujian Broncos	(China) Wei Xin	Quanzhou (playing in Jinjiang)	Jinjiang Sports Center Stadium	15,000	South, 9th
South	Guangxi Longguida ^{P}	(China) Huang Yong	Nanning (playing in Dongxing)	Dongxing Sports Center Stadium	60,000	CAL, 4th
South	Anhui Litian ^{P}	(Serbia) Darko Nović	Hefei	Hefei Olympic Sports Center Stadium	60,000	CAL, 9th

== Managerial changes ==
Team	Outgoing manager	Date of vacancy	Incoming manager	Date of appointment
Meizhou Kejia	(China) Tan Ende	26 May 2015	(China) Zhang Jun	26 May 2015
Anhui Litian	(China) Shang Qing	28 May 2015	(China) Ding Wei (caretaker)	28 May 2015
Meizhou Kejia	(China) Zhang Jun	15 June 2015	(China) He Weiwen	15 June 2015
Anhui Litian	(China) Ding Wei (caretaker)	1 July 2015	(Serbia) Darko Nović	1 July 2015
Meizhou Kejia	(China) He Weiwen	5 July 2015	(China) Qi Wusheng	5 July 2015
Sichuan Longfor	(China) Zhang Weizhe	6 July 2015	(China) Jia Jin	6 July 2015

== Clubs Locations ==
Location of teams in 2015 China League Two

== Group stage standings ==
=== North Group ===
Pos	Team	Pld	W	D	L	GF	GA	GD	Pts	Qualification
1	Dalian Transcendence (P, Q)	14	10	4	0	38	11	+27	34	CL2 Play-offs
2	Nanjing Qianbao (Q)	14	6	6	2	32	16	+16	24	CL2 Play-offs
3	Hebei Elite (Q)	14	6	4	4	20	12	+8	22	CL2 Play-offs
4	Tianjin Huochetou (Q)	14	6	4	4	23	16	+7	22	CL2 Play-offs
5	Baoding Yingli ETS	14	5	5	4	26	17	+9	20	
6	Baotou Nanjiao	14	5	5	4	21	13	+8	20	
7	Yinchuan Helanshan	14	3	2	9	14	25	−11	11	
8	Shenyang Dongjin	14	0	0	14	3	67	−64	0	

(P) Promoted to 2016 China League One; (Q) Qualified for Play-off

=== South Group ===
Pos	Team	Pld	W	D	L	GF	GA	GD	Pts	Qualification
1	Meizhou Kejia (C, P, Q)	14	9	3	2	39	13	+26	30	CL2 Play-offs
2	Sichuan Longfor (Q)	14	7	5	2	24	14	+10	26	CL2 Play-offs
3	Meixian Hakka (Q)	14	6	6	2	14	8	+6	24	CL2 Play-offs
4	Lijiang Jiayunhao (Q)	14	7	3	4	19	15	+4	24	CL2 Play-offs
5	Anhui Litian	14	5	5	4	23	15	+8	20	
6	Yunnan Wanhao	14	3	5	6	9	19	−10	14	
7	Guangxi Longguida	14	2	2	10	10	24	−14	8	
8	Fujian Broncos	14	2	1	11	11	41	−30	7	

(C) Champions; (P) Promoted to 2016 China League One; (Q) Qualified for Play-off

== Group stage results ==
=== North Group ===
Home \ Away	NJQ	DLT	YCH	SYD	HBE	TJH	BTN	BDY
Nanjing Qianbao		1–1	4–0	6–0	3–1	2–2	3–3	0–0
Dalian Transcendence	1–1		1–0	10–1	1–0	2–0	2–0	5–1
Yinchuan Helanshan	1–3	3–4		4–0	0–0	1–2	0–3	0–1
Shenyang Dongjin	0–3	0–4	1–2		0–5	0–4	0–2	0–6
Hebei Elite	2–1	1–1	2–1	4–0		2–0	1–1	2–1
Tianjin Huochetou	3–1	1–1	1–2	4–0	2–0		1–0	0–0
Baotou Nanjiao	1–1	1–3	0–0	6–0	1–0	2–0		0–1
Baoding Yingli ETS	1–3	1–2	3–0	7–1	0–0	3–3	1–1	

Updated to match(es) played on unknown. Source:
Legend: Blue = home team win; Yellow = draw; Red = away team win.

=== South Group ===
Home \ Away	MZK	LJJ	MXH	SCL	YNW	FJB	GXL	AHL
Meizhou Kejia		5–3	2–0	4–0	3–0	10–0	1–0	3–1
Lijiang Jiayunhao	0–0		1–0	0–2	2–2	2–1	2–1	2–1
Meixian Hakka	0–0	1–0		1–1	1–0	4–0	2–1	2–1
Sichuan Longfor	2–2	1–3	0–0		0–0	2–0	3–0	2–1
Yunnan Wanhao	2–1	0–0	0–0	0–5		3–2	1–0	0–0
Fujian Broncos	1–3	0–3	1–2	1–2	2–1		3–0	0–7
Guangxi Longguida	2–4	0–1	0–0	0–2	2–0	2–0		2–2
Anhui Litian	2–1	1–0	1–1	2–2	1–0	0–0	3–0	

Updated to match(es) played on unknown. Source:
Legend: Blue = home team win; Yellow = draw; Red = away team win.

== Play-offs ==
=== Quarter-finals ===
Team 1	Agg.	Team 2	1st leg	2nd leg
Lijiang Jiayunhao	0 - 3	Dalian Transcendence	0 - 1	0 - 2
Hebei Elite	1 - 1	Sichuan Longfor	1 - 1	0 - 0
Tianjin Huochetou	2 - 6	Meizhou Kejia	1 - 2	1 - 4
Meixian Hakka	1 - 1 (5–6 p)	Nanjing Qianbao	1 - 0	0 - 1

==== First leg ====
Sept. 5th, 2015
15:00 UTC+8

Lijiang Jiayunhao	0 - 1	Dalian Transcendence
	Report	13' Su Di

Lijiang Sports Center Stadium, Lijiang

Sept. 5th, 2015
15:00 UTC+8

Hebei Elite	1 - 1	Sichuan Longfor
Ge Hailun 78'	Report	85' Wang Xinzheng

Qinhuangdao Olympic Sports Center Stadium, Qinhuangdao

Sept. 5th, 2015
15:00 UTC+8

Tianjin Huochetou	1 - 2	Meizhou Kejia
Liu Yang 20' (pen.)	Report	68' Cao Tianbao; 84' Pan Jia

Tianjin Locomotive Stadium, Tianjin

Sept. 5th, 2015
15:00 UTC+8

Meixian Hakka	1 - 0	Nanjing Qianbao
Wang Kai 45+'	Report

Meixian Tsang Hin-chi Stadium, Meizhou

==== Second leg ====
Sept. 12th, 2015
15:00 UTC+8

Dalian Transcendence	2 - 0	Lijiang Jiayunhao
Liu Yuchen 10'; Du Wenxiang 85'	Report

Jinzhou Stadium, Dalian

Sept. 12th, 2015
15:00 UTC+8

Sichuan Longfor	0 - 0	Hebei Elite
	Report

Santai County Stadium, Santai

Sept. 12th, 2015
15:00 UTC+8

Meizhou Kejia	4 - 1	Tianjin Huochetou
Cao Tianbao 7', 53' (pen.); Gao Zhilin 20', 75'	Report	60' Li Wenxin

Wuhua County Stadium, Wuhua

Sept. 12th, 2015
15:00 UTC+8

Nanjing Qianbao	1 - 0	Meixian Hakka
Tian Junjie 25' (o.g.)	Report
Penalties
Tan Si (penalty missed); Gan Rui (penalty scored); Wei Renjie (penalty scored); Wang Qing (penalty missed); Bai Fan (penalty scored); Zhu Chao (penalty scored); Ban Yong (penalty scored); Huang Chao (penalty scored)	6 – 5	(penalty scored) Liang Rifu; (penalty missed) Pan Jiajun; (penalty scored) Tian Junjie; (penalty missed) Yu Xin; (penalty scored) Zhang Xingbo; (penalty scored) Li Wenwei; (penalty scored) Li Weixin; (penalty missed) Wang Xingqiang

Wutaishan Stadium, Nanjing

=== Semi-finals ===
Team 1	Agg.	Team 2	1st leg	2nd leg
Sichuan Longfor	2 - 5	Dalian Transcendence	0 - 0	2 - 5
Nanjing Qianbao	1 - 6	Meizhou Kejia	1 - 5	0 - 1

==== First leg ====
Sept. 19th, 2015
15:00 UTC+8

Sichuan Longfor	0 - 0	Dalian Transcendence
	Report

Santai County Stadium, Santai

Sept. 19th, 2015
15:00 UTC+8

Nanjing Qianbao	1 - 5	Meizhou Kejia
Zi Long 74'	Report	2' Ba Dun; 35' Yu Jianfeng; 49' Chen Jianlong; 76', 88' Gao Zhilin

Wutaishan Stadium, Nanjing

==== Second leg ====
Sept. 26th, 2015
15:00 UTC+8

Dalian Transcendence	5 - 2	Sichuan Longfor
Han Jiabao 20'; Hu Zhaojun 43' (pen.); Nan Yunqi 52', 65'; Wang Guanghao 90+'	Report	61' Wang Xinzheng; 82' Zhang Qi

Jinzhou Stadium, Dalian

Sept. 26th, 2015
15:00 UTC+8

Meizhou Kejia	1 - 0	Nanjing Qianbao
Cao Tianbao 32' (pen.)	Report

Wuhua County Stadium, Wuhua

=== Third-Place Match ===
Oct. 10th, 2015
15:00 UTC+8

Sichuan Longfor	1 - 0	Nanjing Qianbao
Lu Cheng 39'	Report

Santai County Stadium, Santai

=== Final Match ===
Oct. 10th, 2015
15:00 UTC+8

Dalian Transcendence	0 - 0	Meizhou Kejia
	Report
Penalties
Liu Tao (penalty scored); Liu Huan (penalty scored); Han Jiabao (penalty scored); Hu Zhaojun (penalty scored); Du Wenxiang (penalty scored); Liu Yuchen (penalty scored); Zhao Yibo (penalty scored); Su Di (penalty missed); Guo Wei (penalty missed)	7 – 8	(penalty scored) Cao Tianbao; (penalty scored) Pan Jia; (penalty scored) Gao Zhilin; (penalty scored) Li Zhilang; (penalty scored) Yu Jianfeng; (penalty scored) Tang Dechao; (penalty scored) Chen Jianlong; (penalty missed) Zhang Zhiquan; (penalty scored) Li Siyuan

Jinzhou Stadium, Dalian

== Attendance ==
Club	Total	Average
Lijiang Jiayunhao	47,494	6,785
Meixian Hakka	46,392	6,627
Baotou Nanjiao	42,548	6,078
Meizhou Kejia	31,901	4,557
Sichuan Longfor	26,745	3,821
Yinchuan Helanshan	17,470	2,496
Anhui Litian	17,039	2,434
Baoding Yingli ETS	16,788	2,398
Guangxi Longguida	11,248	1,607
Nanjing Qianbao	10,797	1,542
Dalian Transcendence	6,287	898
Yunnan Wanhao	4,972	710
Fujian Broncos	4,100	586
Hebei Elite	1,939	277
Shenyang Dongjin	1,508	215
Tianjin Huochetou	1,445	206
Total	288,673	2,577

== Top scorers ==
Rank	Player	Club	Total
1	(China) Liu Yang	Tianjin Huochetou	12
2	(China) Han Jiabao	Dalian Transcendence	11
3	(China) Ji Jun	Meizhou Kejia	9
3	(China) Tan Si	Nanjing Qianbao	9
5	(China) Gao Zhilin	Meizhou Kejia	8
6	(China) Nan Yunqi	Dalian Transcendence	7
6	(China) Quan Heng	Dalian Transcendence	7
6	(China) Wang Yunlong	Anhui Litian	7
6	(China) Zhang Xiang	Lijiang Jiayunhao	7
10	(China) Cao Tianbao	Meizhou Kejia	6
10	(China) Chen Shaoqin	Sichuan Longfor	6
10	(China) Wang Xinzheng	Sichuan Longfor	6
10	(China) Zhang Hongbin	Baoding Yingli ETS	6
10	(China) Zhang Shuang	Baotou Nanjiao	6
10	(China) Zhang Zhiquan	Meizhou Kejia	6
10	(China) Zi Long	Nanjing Qianbao	6

== Awards ==
The awards of 2015 China League Two were announced on 18 November 2015.

- Most valuable player: (China) Hu Zhaojun (Dalian Transcendence)
- Top scorer: (China) Liu Yang (Tianjin Huochetou)
- Best coach: (China) Qi Wusheng (Meizhou Kejia)
