= Luo Heng (footballer) =

Chinese footballer

Luo Heng 罗恒
Personal information
- Full name: Luo Heng
- Date of birth: 16 January 1993 (age 33)
- Place of birth: Xincai, Henan, China
- Height: 1.87 m (6 ft 2 in)
- Position: Defender

Team information
- Current team: Xi'an Chongde Ronghai
- Number: 3

Youth career
- –2012: Henan Jianye

Senior career*
Years	Team	Apps	(Gls)
2013–2019	Henan Jianye	6	(0)
2013	→ Jiangxi Liansheng (loan)	0	(0)
2014	→ Sichuan Leaders (loan)	1	(0)
2018	→ Hebei Elite (loan)	24	(5)
2020	Hebei Jingying Zhihai	0	(0)
2021	Wuxi Wugou	10	(2)
2022-2023	Yuxi Yukun	2	(0)
2024-	Xi'an Chongde Ronghai	5	(0)
- * Club domestic league appearances and goals as of 02 August 2024

Luo Heng (simplified Chinese: 罗恒; traditional Chinese: 羅恒; pinyin: Luó Héng; born 16 January 1993) is a Chinese footballer.

== Club career ==
Luo Heng started his professional football career in 2013 after he was promoted to the first-team squad of China League One side Henan Jianye. He made his senior debut on 22 May 2013 in a 1–0 away defeat against Changchun Yatai in the 2013 Chinese FA Cup, replacing Bi Jinhao in the 77th minute. In July 2013, Luo was loaned to China League Two side Jiangxi Liansheng. However, he did not make any appearances during his loan spell. In March 2014, he was then loaned to fellow League Two side, Sichuan Leaders, following Henan's promotion to the first tier. He made his debut for the club on 30 March 2014, in a 1–0 away win against amateur team Qingdao Huanghai Zhiyao in the 2014 Chinese FA Cup. He returned to Henan in the summer of 2014 and mostly played for Henan Jianye's reserve team during the 2015 and 2016 season. Luo eventually made his Super League debut on 15 April 2017 in a 1–1 home draw against Jiangsu Suning, coming on as a substitute for Abduwali Ablet in the 69th minute.

In March 2018, Luo was then loaned to China League Two side Hebei Elite until 31 December 2018.

== Career statistics ==
As of 02 August 2024.

Club	Season	League			National Cup		Continental		Other		Total	
Club	Season	Division	Apps	Goals	Apps	Goals	Apps	Goals	Apps	Goals	Apps	Goals
Henan Jianye	2013	China League One	0	0	1	0	-		-		1	0
Henan Jianye	2015	Chinese Super League	0	0	0	0	-		-		0	0
Henan Jianye	2016	Chinese Super League	0	0	0	0	-		-		0	0
Henan Jianye	2017	Chinese Super League	6	0	2	0	-		-		8	0
Henan Jianye	Total		6	0	3	0	0	0	0	0	9	0
Jiangxi Liansheng (loan)	2013	China League Two	0	0	0	0	-		-		0	0
Sichuan Leaders (loan)	2014	China League Two	1	0	2	0	-		-		3	0
Hebei Elite (loan)	2018	China League Two	24	5	1	1	-		-		25	6
Hebei Jingying Zhihai	2020	Chinese Champions League	-		-		-		-		-	
Wuxi Wugou	2021	China League Two	10	2	0	0	-		-		10	2
Yuxi Yukun	2022	Chinese Champions League	-		-		-		-		-	
Yuxi Yukun	2023	China League Two	2	0	1	0	-		-		3	0
Yuxi Yukun	Total		2	0	1	0	0	0	0	0	3	0
Xi'an Chongde Ronghai	2024	China League Two	5	0	1	0	-		-		6	0
Career total			48	7	8	1	0	0	0	0	56	8
