= Yang He =

Chinese footballer

Yang He 杨贺
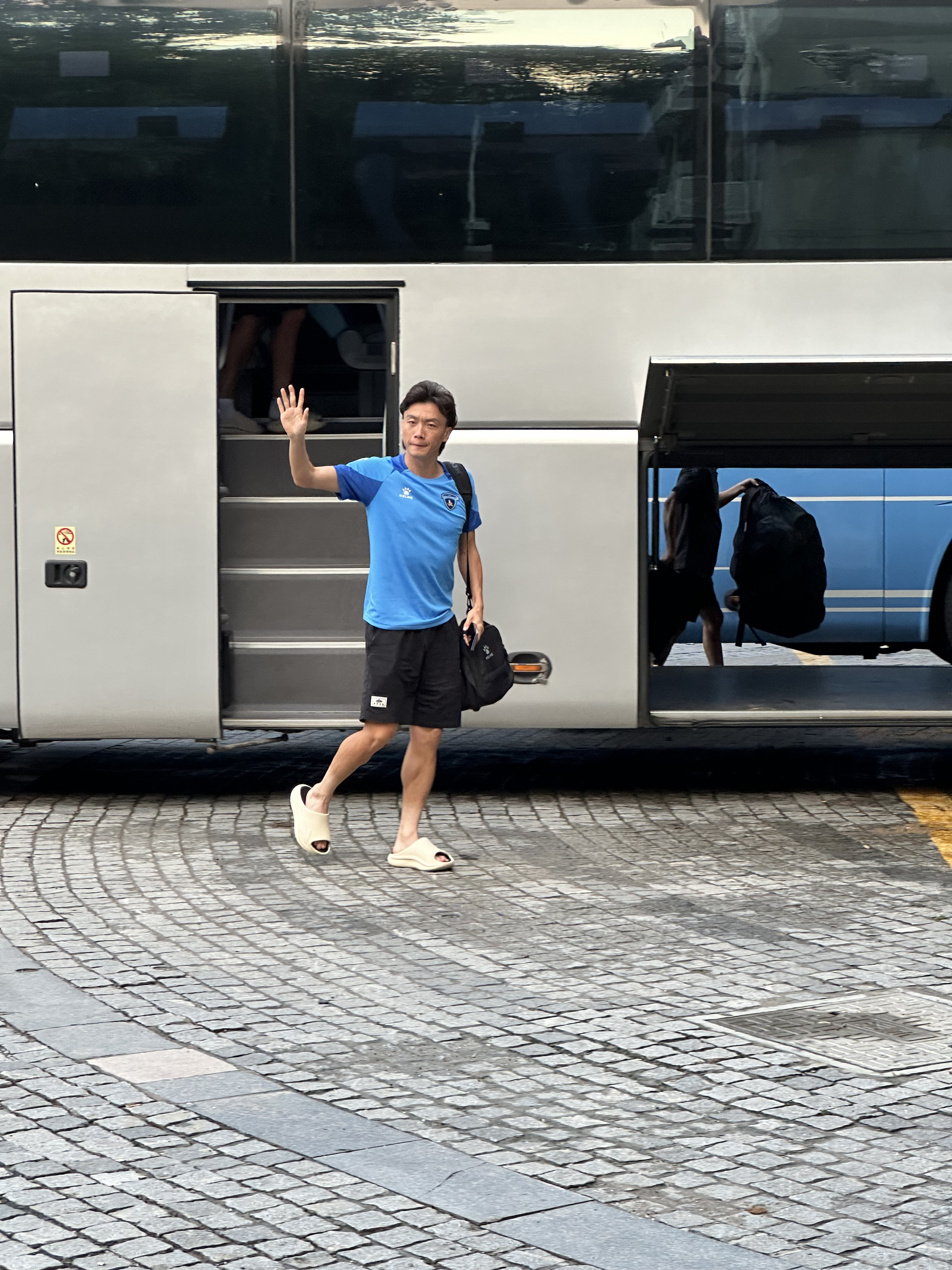
- Yang He in August 2024

Personal information
- Date of birth: 22 March 1990 (age 36)
- Place of birth: Dalian, Liaoning, China
- Height: 1.76 m (5 ft 9 1/2 in)
- Positions: Left winger; left-back

Team information
- Current team: Nanjing City
- Number: 16

Youth career
- Changchun Yatai

Senior career*
Years	Team	Apps	(Gls)
2011–2017	Changchun Yatai	9	(0)
2012	→ Chengdu Blades (loan)	27	(1)
2014	→ Jiangxi Liansheng (loan)	20	(2)
2015	→ Meizhou Hakka (loan)	16	(2)
2017	→ Hebei Elite (loan)	18	(6)
2018–2022	Shaanxi Chang'an Athletic	132	(28)
2023–2024	Nanjing City	50	(5)
2025	Yunnan Yukun	4	(0)
2026	Hougang United	4	(0)
2026–	Nanjing City	0	(0)

Managerial career
- 2026–: Nanjing City (assistant)
- * Club domestic league appearances and goals as of 26 August 2025

Yang He (simplified Chinese: 杨贺; traditional Chinese: 楊賀; pinyin: Yáng Hè; born 22 March 1990 in Dalian) is a Chinese professional footballer who plays either as a left-winger or left-back for China League One club Nanjing City.

== Club career ==
Yang started his professional football career in 2011 when he was promoted to Chinese Super League side Changchun Yatai's first team. On 30 April, he made his senior debut in a 1–1 away draw against Shaanxi Chanba, coming on as a substitute for Du Zhenyu in the 89th minute. He mainly played in the reserve team league and scored 10 goals in 2011 season. When Svetozar Šapurić was appointed as new manager of the club, he stated that Yang was not part of his plans. Yang was lined with Guangzhou Evergrande and Shenzhen Ruby, but finally was loaned to China League One side Chengdu Blades for a season. On 18 March, he made his debut for Chengdu in a 1–0 home victory against Hohhot Dongjin. He scored his first senior goal on 19 May which ensured Chengdu beat Yanbian Baekdu Tigers 3–2. He appeared 28 times for Chengdu in the 2012 season and returned to Changchun at the end of 2012. In February 2014, Yang was loaned to China League Two side Jiangxi Liansheng until 31 December 2014.

On 28 February 2015, Yang was loaned to China League Two side Meizhou Hakka until 31 December 2015. In February 2017, he was loaned to League Two side Hebei Elite until 31 December 2017.

On 25 January 2026, Yang joined Singapore Premier League club Hougang United.

On 4 July 2026, Yang returned to Nanjing City and joined as player-coach.

== Career statistics ==
Statistics accurate as of match played 28 October 2023.

Appearances and goals by club, season and competition
Club	Season	League			National Cup		Continental		Other		Total	
Club	Season	Division	Apps	Goals	Apps	Goals	Apps	Goals	Apps	Goals	Apps	Goals
Changchun Yatai	2011	Chinese Super League	2	0	0	0	-		-		2	0
Changchun Yatai	2013	Chinese Super League	1	0	1	0	-		-		2	0
Changchun Yatai	2016	Chinese Super League	6	0	1	0	-		-		7	0
Changchun Yatai	Total		9	0	2	0	0	0	0	0	11	0
Chengdu Blades (loan)	2012	China League One	27	1	1	0	-		-		28	1
Jiangxi Liansheng (loan)	2014	China League Two	20	2	2	0	-		-		22	2
Meizhou Hakka (loan)	2015	China League Two	16	2	2	0	-		-		18	2
Hebei Elite (loan)	2017	China League Two	18	6	1	2	-		-		19	8
Shaanxi Chang'an Athletic	2018	China League Two	30	15	2	1	-		-		32	16
Shaanxi Chang'an Athletic	2019	China League One	25	4	1	0	-		-		26	4
Shaanxi Chang'an Athletic	2020	China League One	15	3	-		-		-		15	3
Shaanxi Chang'an Athletic	2021	China League One	34	5	0	0	-		-		34	5
Shaanxi Chang'an Athletic	2022	China League One	28	1	0	0	-		-		28	1
Shaanxi Chang'an Athletic	Total		132	28	3	1	0	0	0	0	135	29
Nanjing City	2023	China League One	22	1	0	0	-		-		22	1
Career total			244	40	11	4	0	0	0	0	255	44

== Honours ==
Jiangxi Liansheng

- China League Two: 2014

Meizhou Hakka

- China League Two: 2015
