= Yu Jianfeng =

Chinese association football player

Personal information
- Date of birth: 29 January 1989 (age 37)
- Place of birth: Kaiping, Guangdong, China
- Height: 1.76 m (5 ft 9 in)
- Position: Midfielder

Team information
- Current team: Jiangxi Beidamen
- Number: 17

Senior career*
Years	Team	Apps	(Gls)
2013–2014	Guangdong Sunray Cave	17	(3)
2015–2016	Meizhou Hakka	32	(8)
2017–2022	Nantong Zhiyun	101	(1)
2022-	Jiangxi Beidamen	0	(0)
- * Club domestic league appearances and goals as of 14:01, 25 April 2022 (UTC)

Yu Jianfeng (Chinese: 余剑锋; born 29 January 1989) is a Chinese footballer currently playing as a left-footed midfielder for Jiangxi Beidamen.

On 10 September 2024, Chinese Football Association announced that Yu was banned from football-related activities for five years, from 10 September 2024 to 9 September 2029, for involving in match-fixing.

== Career statistics ==
=== Club ===
As of 31 December 2021.

Club	Season	League			Cup		Other		Total	
Club	Season	Division	Apps	Goals	Apps	Goals	Apps	Goals	Apps	Goals
Guangdong Sunray Cave	2013	China League One	0	0	1 (Note: Appearances in the Chinese FA Cup)	0	0	0	1	0
Guangdong Sunray Cave	2014	China League One	17	3	1	0	0	0	18	3
Guangdong Sunray Cave	Total		17	3	2	0	0	0	19	3
Meizhou Hakka	2015	China League Two	9	2	2	1	0	0	11	3
Meizhou Hakka	2016	China League One	23	6	2	3	0	0	25	9
Meizhou Hakka	Total		32	8	4	4	0	0	36	12
Nantong Zhiyun	2017	China League Two	21	1	2	1	0	0	23	2
Nantong Zhiyun	2018	China League Two	28	0	4	0	0	0	32	0
Nantong Zhiyun	2019	China League One	24	0	1	0	0	0	25	0
Nantong Zhiyun	2020	China League One	11	0	0	0	0	0	11	0
Nantong Zhiyun	2021	China League One	17	0	0	0	0	0	17	0
Nantong Zhiyun	Total		101	1	7	1	0	0	108	2
Career total			150	12	13	5	0	0	163	17
