= Su Di =

Chinese association football player

Personal information
- Date of birth: 17 July 1990 (age 36)
- Place of birth: Shenyang, Liaoning, China
- Height: 1.78 m (5 ft 10 in)
- Positions: Left-back; left winger

Team information
- Current team: Dalian Duxing

Youth career
- –2011: Shenyang Zhongze

Senior career*
Years	Team	Apps	(Gls)
2011–2013	Shenyang Zhongze	23	(1)
2014–2016	Dalian Transcendence	36	(2)
2017	Wuhan Zall	7	(0)
2018–2022	Wuhan Three Towns	39	(7)
2022–	Dalian Duxing	-	(-)
- * Club domestic league appearances and goals as of 14:01, 31 January 2023 (UTC)

Su Di (Chinese: 苏迪; born 17 July 1990) is a Chinese footballer currently playing as a left-back or left winger for Dalian Duxing.

== Club career ==
Su Di began his professional football career with Shenyang Zhongze in the 2011 China League One season. In three seasons with them, he would play 27 times for the club and contributed one goal. On 27 February 2014, he joined third-tier club Dalian Transcendence and would be a vital part of the team that gained promotion to the second tier after the club came runners-up to Meizhou Kejia at the end of the 2015 China League Two campaign. After establishing Dalian Transcendence within the division and helping them avoid relegation the following season, he would attract the interests of second tier promotion chasing Wuhan Zall, who he joined on 20 January 2017.

Su would make his debut for Wuhan Zall in a league game on 16 March 2017 against Meizhou Hakka in a 2–1 defeat. Throughout the season he would struggle to establish himself within the team and was allowed to join fourth tier club Wuhan Three Towns, where he would aid them to promotion to the third tier at the end of the 2018 Chinese Champions League. He would go on to aid them to win the division title and promotion into the second tier at the end of the 2020 China League Two campaign. This would be followed by another division title win and promotion as the club entered the top tier for the first tine in their history.

== Career statistics ==
As of 31 January 2023.

Club	Season	League			Cup		Other		Total	
Club	Season	Division	Apps	Goals	Apps	Goals	Apps	Goals	Apps	Goals
Shenyang Zhongze	2011	China League One	?	?	–		–		?	?
Shenyang Zhongze	2012	China League One	?	?	3	0	–		?	?
Shenyang Zhongze	2013	China League One	?	?	1	0	–		?	?
Shenyang Zhongze	Total		23	1	4	0	0	0	27	1
Dalian Transcendence	2014	China League Two	?	?	2	1	–		?	?
Dalian Transcendence	2015	China League Two	12	1	2	0	–		14	1
Dalian Transcendence	2016	China League One	24	1	0	0	–		24	1
Dalian Transcendence	Total		36	2	4	1	0	0	40	3
Wuhan Zall	2017	China League One	7	0	0	0	–		7	0
Wuhan Three Towns	2018	Chinese Champions League	–		–		–		–	
Wuhan Three Towns	2019	China League Two	27	5	1	0	–		28	5
Wuhan Three Towns	2020	China League Two	11	2	0	0	–		11	1
Wuhan Three Towns	2021	China League One	1	0	2	0	–		3	0
Wuhan Three Towns	Total		39	7	3	0	0	0	42	7
Dalian Duxing	2022	Chinese Champions League	–		–		–		–	
Career total			105	10	11	1	0	0	116	11

== Honours ==
=== Club ===
Wuhan Three Towns

- China League One: 2021.
- China League Two: 2020.
