= Li Siyuan (footballer) =

Chinese footballer

Li Siyuan 李思源
Personal information
- Full name: Li Siyuan
- Date of birth: 6 February 1986 (age 40)
- Place of birth: Chongqing, Sichuan, China
- Height: 1.81 m (5 ft 11 in)
- Position: Defender

Senior career*
Years	Team	Apps	(Gls)
2005–2010	Chongqing Lifan	92	(2)
2011–2013	Chongqing FC	66	(3)
2014	Sichuan Longfor	2	(0)
2014–2016	Meizhou Kejia	37	(0)
2017–2018	Shenzhen Ledman	50	(3)
- * Club domestic league appearances and goals as of 13 October 2018

Li Siyuan (Chinese: 李思源; born 6 February 1986) is a Chongqing, Chinese former footballer.

== Club career ==
Li Siyuan started his professional football career in 2005 when he joined Chongqing Lifan for the 2005 Chinese Super League campaign. On 3 July 2005, he made his debut for Chongqing Lifan in the 2005 Chinese Super League against Sichuan Guancheng. In March 2011, Li transferred to China League Two side Chongqing F.C. In March 2014, he transferred to China League Two side Sichuan Longfor. In July 2014, Li transferred to another China League Two side Meizhou Kejia.

On 23 January 2017, Li moved to League Two side Shenzhen Ledman.

== Career statistics ==
Statistics accurate as of match played 13 October 2018.

Club performance			League		Cup		League Cup		Continental		Total	
Season	Club	League	Apps	Goals	Apps	Goals	Apps	Goals	Apps	Goals	Apps	Goals
China PR			League		FA Cup		CSL Cup		Asia		Total	
2005	Chongqing Lifan	Chinese Super League	11	0					-		11	0
2006	Chongqing Lifan	Chinese Super League	0	0			-		-		0	0
2007	Chongqing Lifan	China League One	19	1	-		-		-		19	1
2008	Chongqing Lifan	China League One	23	1	-		-		-		23	1
2009	Chongqing Lifan	Chinese Super League	24	0	-		-		-		24	0
2010	Chongqing Lifan	Chinese Super League	15	0	-		-		-		15	0
2011	Chongqing F.C.	China League Two	24	3	-		-		-		24	3
2012	Chongqing F.C.	China League One	20	0	1	0	-		-		21	0
2013	Chongqing F.C.	China League One	22	0	1	0	-		-		23	0
2014	Sichuan Longfor	China League Two	2	0	-		-		-		2	0
2014	Meizhou Kejia	China League Two	11	0	0	0	-		-		11	0
2015	Meizhou Kejia	China League Two	13	0	3	0	-		-		16	0
2016	Meizhou Kejia	China League One	13	0	2	0	-		-		15	0
2017	Shenzhen Ledman	China League Two	25	0	2	0	-		-		27	0
2018	Shenzhen Ledman	China League Two	25	3	1	0	-		-		26	3
Total	China PR		247	8	10	0	0	0	0	0	257	8
