= Ji Jun =

Chinese association football player

Personal information
- Date of birth: 27 December 1985 (age 40)
- Place of birth: Shanghai
- Height: 1.89 m (6 ft 2 in)
- Position: Forward

Senior career*
Years	Team	Apps	(Gls)
2005–2011	Nanchang Hengyuan	72	(9)
2013–2015	Meizhou Hakka	23	(14)
2016–2017	Shanghai Shenxin	45	(6)
2018–2020	Nantong Zhiyun	56	(10)
- * Club domestic league appearances and goals as of 15:54, 31 December 2020 (UTC)

Ji Jun (Chinese: 季俊; pinyin: Jì Jùn; born 27 December 1985) is a Chinese footballer.

== Club career ==
Ji Jun would be a graduate of the Shanghai Zhabei Football Academy in 2003, however he failed to be selected for the Shanghai National Games team, so he joined the newly established Shanghai Hengyuan Football Club in the third tier. The club would relocate to Nanchang, Jiangxi and rename themselves Nanchang Hengyuan as well as going on to win the division title at the end of the 2005 league season. Initially starting as a midfielder, Ji would be moved as a forward and go on to score six goals within the 2009 China League One season as the team came runners-up within the division and gain promotion to the top tier for the first time in their history.

Within the top tier of Chinese football, Ji would struggle to gain much game time and actively paid for his own flight to pursue a move to Indonesia before joining Meizhou Hakka in the third tier. The move would see a revival in his career and he would win the 2015 China League Two division title with them and promotion to the second tier. Ji decided to rejoin his previous club at the start of the 2016 league season, Nanchang Hengyuan who had returned to Shanghai and renamed themselves Shanghai Shenxin F.C. several seasons earlier. On 14 February 2018, Ji joined third tier club Nantong Zhiyun.

== Career statistics ==
As of 31 December 2020.

Club	Season	League			National Cup		Continental		Other		Total	
Club	Season	Division	Apps	Goals	Apps	Goals	Apps	Goals	Apps	Goals	Apps	Goals
Nanchang Hengyuan	2005	China League Two			-		-		-			
Nanchang Hengyuan	2006	China League One	18	0	0	0	-		-		18	0
Nanchang Hengyuan	2007	China League One	7	0	-		-		-		7	0
Nanchang Hengyuan	2008	China League One	21	3	-		-		-		21	3
Nanchang Hengyuan	2009	China League One	14	6	-		-		-		14	6
Nanchang Hengyuan	2010	Chinese Super League	9	0	-		-		-		9	0
Nanchang Hengyuan	2011	Chinese Super League	3	0	1	1	-		-		4	1
Nanchang Hengyuan	2012	Chinese Super League	0	0	0	0	-		-		0	0
Nanchang Hengyuan	Total		72	9	1	1	0	0	0	0	73	10
Meizhou Hakka	2013	China League Two		4	0	0	-		-			4
Meizhou Hakka	2014	China League Two	9	1	0	0	-		-		9	1
Meizhou Hakka	2015	China League Two	14	9	3 (Note: Appearances in the Chinese FA Cup)	0	-		-		17	9
Meizhou Hakka	Total		23	14	3	0	0	0	0	0	26	14
Shanghai Shenxin	2016	China League One	23	2	2	0	-		-		25	2
Shanghai Shenxin	2017	China League One	22	4	6	2	-		-		28	6
Shanghai Shenxin	Total		45	6	8	2	0	0	0	0	53	8
Nantong Zhiyun	2018	China League Two	28	5	4	4	-		-		32	9
Nantong Zhiyun	2019	China League One	21	5	1	0	-		-		22	5
Nantong Zhiyun	2020	China League One	7	0	-		-		-		7	0
Nantong Zhiyun	Total		56	10	5	4	0	0	0	0	61	14
Career total			196	39	17	7	0	0	0	0	213	46

== Honours ==
=== Club ===
Nanchang Hengyuan

- China League Two: 2005

Meizhou Hakka

- China League Two: 2015
