= Li Zhilang =

Chinese footballer (born 1991)

Li Zhilang 李智塱
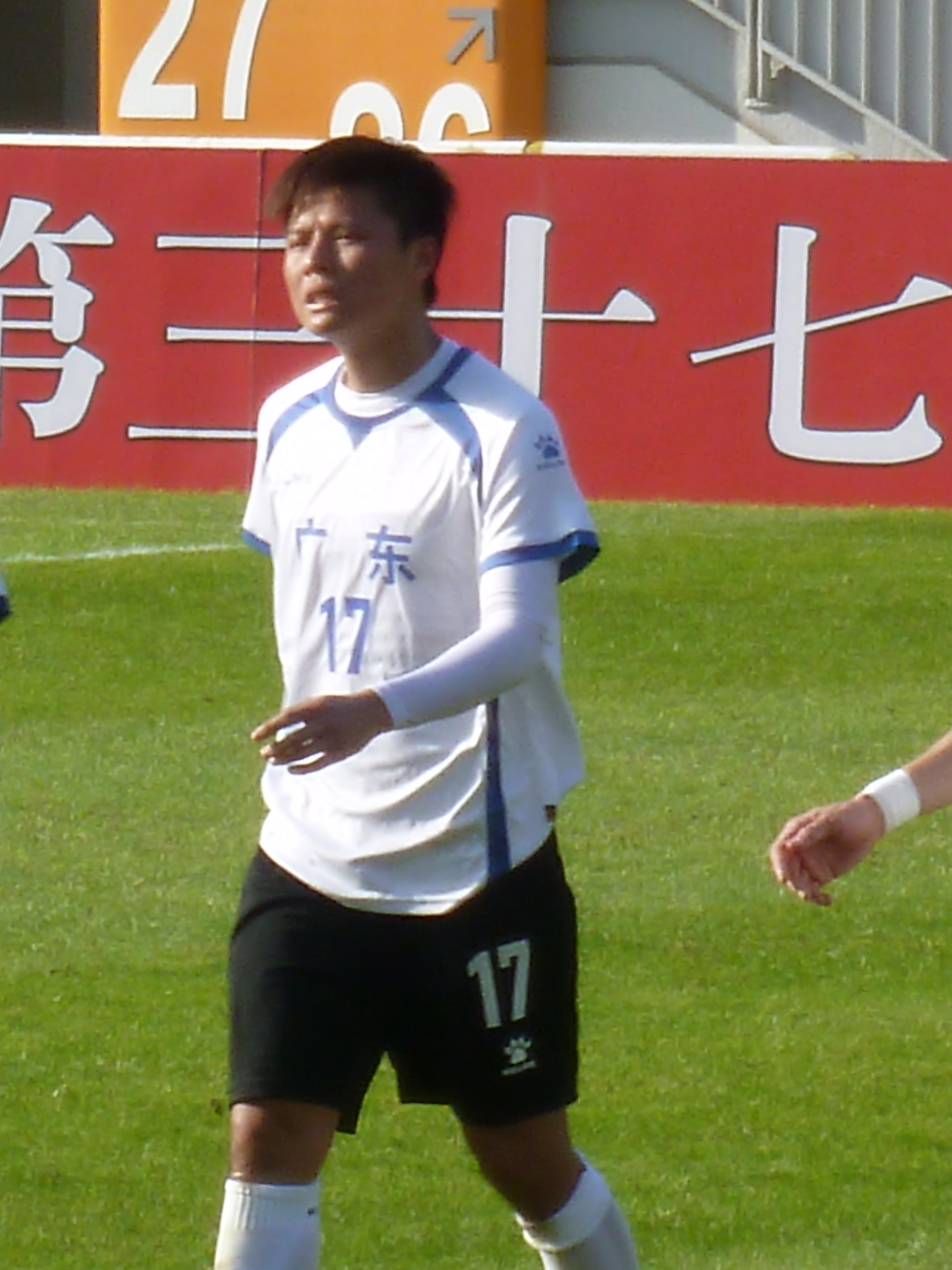

Personal information
- Full name: Li Zhilang
- Date of birth: 22 August 1991 (age 35)
- Place of birth: Guangzhou, Guangdong, China
- Height: 1.73 m (5 ft 8 in)
- Position: Midfielder

Youth career
- Guangzhou Evergrande

Senior career*
Years	Team	Apps	(Gls)
2010–2013	Guangzhou Evergrande	13	(0)
2014–2022	Meizhou Hakka	133	(2)

International career
2009–2010	China U-20		
2012	China U-22		
- * Club domestic league appearances and goals as of 21 December 2022

Li Zhilang (Chinese: 李智塱; pinyin: Li Zhìlǎng; born 22 August 1991) is a Chinese former professional footballer who played as a midfielder for Guangzhou Evergrande and Meizhou Hakka.

== Club career ==
Li Zhilang first started his footballing career with Guangzhou Evergrande's youth academy as a young player. Li was promoted to Guangzhou's first team squad by then manager Peng Weiguo in the 2010 season. The subsequent manager Lee Jang-soo handed Li his debut for Guangzhou on 25 April 2010 in an away draw against Chengdu Blades. In his first season with the club he go on to establish himself as a regular within the team and win the division title and promotion with the club at the end of the 2010 China League One season.

While Li may have been part of the squad that saw significant investment as Guangzhou won multiple league titles he saw very little playing time. In March 2014, Li moved to China League Two side Meizhou Kejia. He went on to win the 2015 China League Two division and promotion into the second tier. He would then go on to be a vital member of the team for several seasons until they gained promotion to the top tier after coming second within the division at the end of the 2021 China League One campaign, before he decided to retire.

== International career ==
Li was called up into the Chinese under-20 national team's squad by Su Maozhen in June 2009. He also took part in the 2010 AFC U-19 Championship qualification for China's qualifying matches.

== Club statistics ==
Statistics accurate as of match played 21 December 2022.

Club	Season	League			National Cup		Continental		Other		Total	
Club	Season	Division	Apps	Goals	Apps	Goals	Apps	Goals	Apps	Goals	Apps	Goals
Guangzhou Evergrande	2010	China League One	12	0	-		-		-		12	0
Guangzhou Evergrande	2011	Chinese Super League	0	0	0	0	-		-		0	0
Guangzhou Evergrande	2012	Chinese Super League	1	0	0	0	0	0	0 (Note: Appearances in Chinese FA Super Cup)	0	1	0
Guangzhou Evergrande	2013	Chinese Super League	0	0	0	0	0	0	0	0	0	0
Guangzhou Evergrande	Total		13	0	0	0	0	0	0	0	13	0
Meizhou Hakka	2014	China League Two	5	0	0	0	-		-		5	0
Meizhou Hakka	2015	China League Two	18	2	3	2	-		-		21	4
Meizhou Hakka	2016	China League One	25	0	2	0	-		-		27	0
Meizhou Hakka	2017	China League One	20	0	1	0	-		-		21	0
Meizhou Hakka	2018	China League One	29	0	1	0	-		-		30	0
Meizhou Hakka	2019	China League One	18	0	0	0	-		-		18	0
Meizhou Hakka	2020	China League One	12	0	1	0	-		-		13	0
Meizhou Hakka	2021	China League One	6	0	1	0	-		-		7	0
Meizhou Hakka	Total		133	2	9	2	0	0	0	0	142	4
Career total			146	2	9	2	0	0	0	0	155	4

== Honours ==
=== Club ===
Guangzhou Evergrande

- Chinese Super League: 2011, 2012, 2013
- China League One: 2010
- AFC Champions League: 2013

Meizhou Kejia

- China League Two: 2015
