= Ye Ruiheng =

Chinese association football player

Personal information
- Date of birth: 26 May 1998 (age 28)
- Place of birth: Guangdong, China
- Height: 1.88 m (6 ft 2 in)
- Position: Goalkeeper

Team information
- Current team: Jiangxi Beidamen
- Number: 36

Senior career*
Years	Team	Apps	(Gls)
2018–	Jiangxi Beidamen	17	(0)
- * Club domestic league appearances and goals as of 14:01, 24 August 2021 (UTC)

Ye Ruiheng (Chinese: 叶睿恒; born 26 May 1998) is a Chinese footballer currently playing as a goalkeeper for Jiangxi Beidamen.

== Career statistics ==
=== Club ===
As of 24 August 2021.

Club	Season	League			Cup		Other		Total	
Club	Season	Division	Apps	Goals	Apps	Goals	Apps	Goals	Apps	Goals
Jiangxi Beidamen	2018	China League Two	4	0	0	0	2 (Note: Appearances in the China League Two playoffs)	0	6	0
Jiangxi Beidamen	2019	China League Two	7	0	2 (Note: Appearances in the Chinese FA Cup)	0	3	0	12	0
Jiangxi Beidamen	2020	China League One	1	0	0	0	0	0	1	0
Jiangxi Beidamen	2021	China League One	5	0	0	0	0	0	5	0
Career total			17	0	2	0	5	0	24	0
