= Luo Hongshi =

Chinese association football player

Personal information
- Date of birth: 22 January 1999 (age 27)
- Height: 1.83 m (6 ft 0 in)
- Position: Midfielder

Youth career
- Valencia
- –2020: Dalian Pro

Senior career*
| Years | Team | Apps | (Gls) |
| 2020 | Hebei Zhuoao | 4 | (0) |
| 2021–2022 | Beijing BSU | 17 | (0) |
- * Club domestic league appearances and goals as of 14:01, 30 October 2022 (UTC)

Luo Hongshi (Chinese: 罗红石; born 22 January 1999) is a Chinese former footballer who played as a midfielder.

== Club career ==
Luo was invited to join the academy of Valencia as part of the Wanda Group initiative to bring young Chinese players to Spanish clubs.

== Career statistics ==
=== Club ===
As of 30 October 2022.

| Club | Season | League | | | Cup | | Other | | Total | |
| Club | Season | Division | Apps | Goals | Apps | Goals | Apps | Goals | Apps | Goals |
|---|---|---|---|---|---|---|---|---|---|---|
| Hebei Zhuoao | 2020 | China League Two | 4 | 0 | 0 | 0 | 0 | 0 | 4 | 0 |
| Beijing BSU | 2021 | China League One | 3 | 0 | 1 (Note: Appearances in the Chinese FA Cup) | 0 | 0 | 0 | 4 | 0 |
| Beijing BSU | 2022 | China League One | 14 | 0 | 0 | 0 | 0 | 0 | 14 | 0 |
| Beijing BSU | Total | | 17 | 0 | 1 | 0 | 0 | 0 | 18 | 0 |
| Career total | | | 21 | 0 | 1 | 0 | 0 | 0 | 22 | 0 |
