= Yuan Mingcan =

Chinese association football player

Personal information
- Date of birth: 12 December 1989 (age 36)
- Height: 1.75 m (5 ft 9 in)
- Position: Midfielder

Team information
- Current team: Jiangxi Beidamen
- Number: 37

Senior career*
Years	Team	Apps	(Gls)
2013	Wuhan Zall	0	(0)
2014–	Jiangxi Beidamen		
- * Club domestic league appearances and goals as of 14:01, 24 August 2021 (UTC)

Yuan Mingcan (Chinese: 袁明灿; born 12 December 1989) is a Chinese footballer currently playing as a midfielder for Jiangxi Beidamen.

== Career statistics ==
=== Club ===
As of 24 August 2021.

Club	Season	League			Cup		Other		Total	
Club	Season	Division	Apps	Goals	Apps	Goals	Apps	Goals	Apps	Goals
Wuhan Zall	2013	Chinese Super League	0	0	1 (Note: Appearances in the Chinese FA Cup)	0	0	0	1	0
Wuhan Zall	2014	China League One	0	0	0	0	0	0	0	0
Wuhan Zall	Total		0	0	1	0	0	0	0	0
Jiangxi Beidamen	2014	China League Two	–		1	0	0	0	1	0
Jiangxi Beidamen	2015	China League One	0	0	0	0	0	0	0	0
Jiangxi Beidamen	2016	China League Two	7	0	0	0	2 (Note: Appearances in the China League Two playoffs)	0	9	0
Jiangxi Beidamen	2017	China League Two	17	7	0	0	2	1	19	8
Jiangxi Beidamen	2018	China League Two	16	2	0	0	1	2	17	4
Jiangxi Beidamen	2019	China League Two	19	8	2	0	4	2	25	10
Jiangxi Beidamen	2020	China League One	2	0	0	0	0	0	3	0
Jiangxi Beidamen	2021	China League One	2	0	1	0	0	0	3	0
Jiangxi Beidamen	Total		63	17	4	0	9	5	77	22
Career total			63	17	5	0	9	5	78	22
