= Tang Yuan =

Chinese footballer

Tang Yuan 唐渊
Personal information
- Date of birth: March 2, 1989 (age 37)
- Place of birth: Guiyang, Guizhou, China
- Height: 1.88 m (6 ft 2 in)
- Position: Defender

Senior career*
Years	Team	Apps	(Gls)
2008–2014	Guizhou Zhicheng	58	(4)
2015	Guizhou Renhe	6	(0)
2016	Yinchuan Helanshan	5	(0)
2017	Chengdu Qbao	13	(0)
2018–2019	Guizhou Hengfeng	0	(0)
- * Club domestic league appearances and goals as of 31 December 2019

Tang Yuan (Chinese: 唐渊; born 2 March 1989 in Guiyang, Guizhou) is a Chinese football player.

== Club career ==
In 2008, Tang Yuan started his professional footballer career with Guizhou Zhicheng in the China League Two. On 8 January 2015, Tang moved to Chinese Super League side Guizhou Renhe on a free transfer. On 17 May 2015, Tang made his debut for Guizhou Renhe in the 2015 Chinese Super League against Shanghai Shenhua, coming on as a substitute for Zhang Chenglin in the 94th minute.

In March 2016, Tang transferred to China League Two side Yinchuan Helanshan. In February 2017, Tang transferred to fellow League Two side Chengdu Qbao.

== Career statistics ==
Statistics accurate as of match played 31 December 2019.

Appearances and goals by club, season and competition
Club	Season	League			National Cup		Continental		Other		Total	
Club	Season	Division	Apps	Goals	Apps	Goals	Apps	Goals	Apps	Goals	Apps	Goals
Guizhou Zhicheng	2008	China League Two			-		-		-			
Guizhou Zhicheng	2009	China League Two			-		-		-			
Guizhou Zhicheng	2010	China League Two			-		-		-			
Guizhou Zhicheng	2011	China League One	17	0	0	0	-		-		17	0
Guizhou Zhicheng	2012	China League Two	26	2	2	0	-		-		28	2
Guizhou Zhicheng	2013	China League One	3	0	0	0	-		-		3	0
Guizhou Zhicheng	2014	China League Two	12	2	0	0	-		-		12	2
Guizhou Zhicheng	Total		58	4	2	0	0	0	0	0	60	0
Guizhou Renhe	2015	Chinese Super League	6	0	1	0	-		-		7	0
Yinchuan Helanshan	2016	China League Two	5	0	2	0	-		-		7	0
Chengdu Qbao	2017	China League Two	13	0	2	0	-		-		15	0
Guizhou Hengfeng	2018	Chinese Super League	0	0	0	0	-		-		0	0
Guizhou Hengfeng	2019	China League One	0	0	1	0	-		-		1	0
Guizhou Hengfeng	Total		0	0	1	0	0	0	0	0	1	0
Career total			82	4	8	0	0	0	0	0	90	4

== Honours ==
Guizhou Hengfeng

- China League Two: 2012
