= Wei Renjie =

Chinese association football player

Personal information
- Date of birth: 18 February 1991 (age 35)
- Place of birth: Zaozhuang, China
- Height: 1.76 m (5 ft 9 in)
- Position: Midfielder

Senior career*
Years	Team	Apps	(Gls)
2009–2014	Qingdao Jonoon	13	(0)
2013	→ Shandong Tengding (loan)	16	(1)
2014	→ Nanjing Qianbao (loan)	9	(5)
2015–2016	Chengdu Qbao	33	(5)
2017–2021	Shaanxi Chang'an Athletic	74	(3)
2021	→ Zibo Cuju (loan)	5	(0)
- * Club domestic league appearances and goals as of 31 December 2020

Wei Renjie (simplified Chinese: 魏仁杰; traditional Chinese: 魏仁傑; pinyin: Wèi Rénjié; born 18 February 1991) is a Chinese footballer.

== Club career ==
Wei Renjie would start his professional career with top tier club Qingdao Jonoon where he made his debut in a league game on 14 June 2009 against Shenzhen FC where he came on as a substitute in a 2-2 draw. As a peripheral young player he was loaned out to lower league club Shandong Tengding and then Nanjing Qianbao before making the move permanent as they moved city and renamed themselves Chengdu Qbao. By the 2017 league season he would join third tier club Shaanxi Chang'an Athletic where he gained promotion with them as the club finished third within the 2018 league season while Yanbian Funde was dissolved due to owing taxes.

== Career statistics ==
As of 31 December 2020

Club	Season	League			Cup		Other		Total	
Club	Season	Division	Apps	Goals	Apps	Goals	Apps	Goals	Apps	Goals
Qingdao Jonoon	2009	Chinese Super League	4	0	0	0	0	0	4	0
Qingdao Jonoon	2010	Chinese Super League	5	0	0	0	0	0	5	0
Qingdao Jonoon	2011	Chinese Super League	1	0	1	0	0	0	2	0
Qingdao Jonoon	2012	Chinese Super League	3	0	1 (Note: Appearances in the Chinese FA Cup)	0	0	0	4	0
Qingdao Jonoon	Total		9	0	2	0	0	0	11	0
Shandong Tengding (loan)	2013	China League Two	16	1	0	0	0	0	16	1
Nanjing Qianbao (loan)	2014	China League Two	9	5	0	0	0	0	9	5
Chengdu Qbao	2015	China League Two	16	3	0	0	0	0	16	3
Chengdu Qbao	2016	China League Two	17	2	2	0	2 (Note: Appearances in the China League Two playoffs)	0	21	2
Chengdu Qbao	Total		33	5	2	0	2	0	37	5
Shaanxi Chang'an Athletic	2017	China League Two	21	2	1	0	2	0	24	0
Shaanxi Chang'an Athletic	2018	China League Two	20	1	1	0	2	0	23	1
Shaanxi Chang'an Athletic	2019	China League One	21	0	0	0	0	0	14	0
Shaanxi Chang'an Athletic	2020	China League One	12	0	0	0	0	0	12	0
Shaanxi Chang'an Athletic	Total		74	3	2	0	4	0	80	3
Career total			145	14	5	0	6	0	156	14
