= Du Wenxiang =

Chinese football player

Du Wenxiang 杜文翔
Personal information
- Date of birth: October 31, 1991 (age 35)
- Place of birth: Shandong, China
- Height: 1.86 m (6 ft 1 in)
- Position: Forward

Youth career
- 2004–2009: Chongqing Lifan

Senior career*
Years	Team	Apps	(Gls)
2010–2013	Chongqing Lifan	23	(0)
2013	→ Beijing BIT (Loan)	20	(0)
2014–2016	Dalian Transcendence	50	(13)
2017–2019	Sichuan Longfor	22	(5)
2020	Xi'an UKD	5	(0)
2021–2022	Qingdao Hainiu	8	(1)
2022	→ Zibo Cuju (loan)	16	(1)
2023	Qingdao Red Lions	2	(0)

International career
2010	China U19		

Managerial career
- 2025-: Nantong Zhiyun U19 (fitness)
- * Club domestic league appearances and goals as of 15 September 2022

Du Wenxiang (Chinese: 杜文翔; born 31 October 1991 in Shandong) is a Chinese football coach and former football player.

== Club career ==
Du Wenxiang was promoted to Chongqing Lifan's first team squad in 2010. On 16 October 2010, he made his debut for Chongqing Lifan in the 2010 Chinese Super League against Jiangsu Sainty, coming on as a substitute for José Filho Duarte in the 83rd minute. On 17 February 2013, Du was loaned to China League One side Beijing BIT until 31 December 2013. He transferred to Dalian Transcendence in March 2014. After two seasons he would gain promotion with the club.

On 18 January 2017, Du moved to League Two side Sichuan Longfor. He would establish himself as a regular within the team and go on to win 2018 China League Two division title with the club.

In April 2025, Nantong Zhiyun announced that Du joined their U19 youth team as fitness coach.

== Career statistics ==
Statistics accurate as of match played 31 December 2020.

Appearances and goals by club, season and competition
Club	Season	League			National Cup		Continental		Other		Total	
Club	Season	Division	Apps	Goals	Apps	Goals	Apps	Goals	Apps	Goals	Apps	Goals
Chongqing Lifan	2010	Chinese Super League	2	0	-		-		-		2	0
Chongqing Lifan	2011	China League One	4	0	0	0	-		-		4	0
Chongqing Lifan	2012	China League One	17	0	2	1	-		-		19	1
Chongqing Lifan	Total		23	0	2	1	0	0	0	0	25	1
Beijing BIT (loan)	2013	China League One	20	0	1	0	-		-		21	0
Dalian Transcendence	2014	China League Two	16	6	1	1	-		-		17	7
Dalian Transcendence	2015	China League Two	17	4	3	0	-		-		20	4
Dalian Transcendence	2016	China League One	17	3	1	0	-		-		18	3
Dalian Transcendence	Total		50	13	5	1	0	0	0	0	55	14
Sichuan Longfor	2017	China League Two	10	1	1	0	-		-		11	1
Sichuan Longfor	2018	China League Two	10	4	0	0	-		-		10	4
Sichuan Longfor	2019	China League One	2	0	0	0	-		1 (Note: Appearance(s) in China League One relegation play-offs)	0	3	0
Sichuan Longfor	Total		22	5	1	0	0	0	1	0	24	5
Xi'an UKD	2020	China League Two	5	0	-		-		-		5	0
Career total			120	15	9	2	0	0	1	0	130	17

== Honours ==
=== Club ===
Sichuan Longfor

- China League Two: 2018
