= Ilhamjan Iminjan =

Uyghur-Chinese footballer

Personal information
- Full name: Ilhamjan Iminjan
- Date of birth: 30 June 1986 (age 40)
- Place of birth: Karamay, Xinjiang, China
- Height: 1.76 m (5 ft 9 1/2 in)
- Position: Winger

Team information
- Current team: Xinjiang Alar 359

Youth career
- Xinjiang Normal University

Senior career*
Years	Team	Apps	(Gls)
2012–2021	Guizhou Zhicheng	193	(35)
2022–	Xinjiang Alar 359	0	(0)
- * Club domestic league appearances and goals as of 27 May 2022

Ilhamjan Iminjan (Chinese: 伊力哈木江·伊明江; pinyin: Yīlìhāmùjiāng Yīmíngjiāng; Mandarin pronunciation: [í.lî.xá.mû tɕjáŋ í.mǐŋ.tɕjáŋ]; born 30 June 1986) is a Chinese footballer who plays as midfielder for Chinese club Xinjiang Alar 359.

== Club career ==
Ilhamjan Iminjan followed Xinjiang Normal University to win 2009/10 China University Football League. He became a PE teacher at a primary school of his hometown Karamay after his graduation in 2010. He signed his first professional football contract at the age of 26 in 2012 after his impression in a trial with China League Two side Guizhou Zhicheng. He scored 12 goals in 24 appearances as Guizhou won the title and won promotion to the second tier. He was the key player of Guizhou to promoted back to China League One in 2014 season and promotion to Chinese Super League in 2016 season. Ilhamjan extended his contract with the club on 14 January 2017. He made his Super League debut on 3 March 2017 in a 1–1 home draw against Liaoning F.C.

== Career statistics ==
As of 31 December 2020.

Appearances and goals by club, season and competition
Club	Season	League			National Cup		Continental		Other		Total	
Club	Season	Division	Apps	Goals	Apps	Goals	Apps	Goals	Apps	Goals	Apps	Goals
Guizhou Zhicheng	2012	China League Two	24	12	3	1	-		-		27	13
Guizhou Zhicheng	2013	China League One	25	5	0	0	-		-		25	5
Guizhou Zhicheng	2014	China League Two	19	7	2	0	-		-		21	7
Guizhou Zhicheng	2015	China League One	23	3	0	0	-		-		23	3
Guizhou Zhicheng	2016	China League One	28	6	0	0	-		-		28	6
Guizhou Zhicheng	2017	Chinese Super League	25	0	1	1	-		-		26	1
Guizhou Zhicheng	2018	Chinese Super League	19	0	2	0	-		-		21	0
Guizhou Zhicheng	2019	China League One	20	2	0	0	-		-		20	2
Guizhou Zhicheng	2020	China League One	10	0	0	0	-		-		10	0
Guizhou Zhicheng	Total		193	35	8	2	0	0	0	0	201	37
Career total			193	35	8	2	0	0	0	0	201	37

== Honours ==
=== Club ===
Guizhou Zhicheng

- China League Two: 2012
