= Han Jiabao =

Chinese footballer

Han Jiabao 韩家宝
Personal information
- Full name: Han Jiabao 韩家宝
- Date of birth: April 16, 1990 (age 36)
- Place of birth: Dalian, China
- Height: 1.82 m (6 ft 0 in)
- Positions: Forward; midfielder

Senior career*
Years	Team	Apps	(Gls)
2006–2010	Dalian Yiteng	?	(?)
2011–2013	Dalian Shide	1	(0)
2012	→ Hebei Zhongji (Loan)	18	(4)
2013	→ Qingdao Hainiu (Loan)	15	(4)
2014–2016	Dalian Transcendence	44	(18)
2016	Henan Jianye	2	(0)
2017–2018	Shenzhen Ledman	18	(1)
2018	Sichuan Jiuniu	6	(0)
2019–2020	Zhejiang Yiteng	22	(4)
2021	Shanxi Longjin	28	(10)
2022	Liaoning Shenyang Urban	14	(2)
2023	Hunan Billows	7	(1)
- * Club domestic league appearances and goals as of 26 April 2022

Han Jiabao (Chinese: 韩家宝) is a Chinese professional footballer who plays as a forward or midfielder.

== Club career ==
Han Jiabao would start his career in the 2006 Chinese league season with Dalian Yiteng and see them win promotion to the second tier at the end of the season. Within the 2007 league season he would then go on to play in eleven games and scored one goal, however in the following season while Han played in a further twelve games he couldn't prevent the club from relegation at the end of the 2008 campaign. After having a personally impressive season in 2010 where he scored five goals he would attract the interests of top-tier club Dalian Shide F.C. and the beginning of the 2011 league season and made his debut for them on June 26, 2011, against Shanghai Shenhua in a 2–1 defeat. By the beginning of the 2012 league season Han was unable to add any more appearances for Dalian Shide and he was loaned out to third-tier club Hebei Zhongji. In March 2013, Han was loaned to China League Two side Qingdao Hainiu until 31 December 2013. In March 2014, Han transferred to China League Two side Dalian Transcendence. On 15 July 2016, Han transferred to Chinese Super League side Henan Jianye.

On 23 January 2017, Han moved to fellow League Two side Shenzhen Ledman.

== Career statistics ==
Statistics accurate as of match played 31 December 2020.

Appearances and goals by club, season and competition
Club	Season	League			National Cup		Continental		Other		Total	
Club	Season	Division	Apps	Goals	Apps	Goals	Apps	Goals	Apps	Goals	Apps	Goals
Dalian Yiteng	2006	China League Two	?	?	-		-		-		?	?
Dalian Yiteng	2007	China League One	11	1	-		-		-		11	1
Dalian Yiteng	2008	China League One	12	0	-		-		-		12	0
Dalian Yiteng	2009	China League Two	?	?	-		-		-		?	?
Dalian Yiteng	2010	China League Two	?	5	-		-		-		?	5
Dalian Yiteng	Total		23	6	0	0	0	0	0	0	23	6
Dalian Shide	2011	Chinese Super League	1	0	0	0	-		-		1	0
Hebei Zhongji (Loan)	2012	China League Two	18	4	0	0	-		-		18	4
Qingdao Hainiu (Loan)	2013	China League Two	15	4	-		-		-		15	4
Dalian Transcendence	2014	China League Two	15	7	2	1	-		-		17	8
Dalian Transcendence	2015	China League Two	18	11	2	0	-		-		20	11
Dalian Transcendence	2016	China League One	11	0	1	0	-		-		12	0
Dalian Transcendence	Total		44	18	5	1	0	0	0	0	49	19
Henan Jianye	2016	Chinese Super League	2	0	0	0	-		-		2	0
Shenzhen Ledman	2017	China League Two	18	1	1	0	-		-		19	1
Shenzhen Ledman	2018	China League Two	0	0	0	0	-		-		0	0
Shenzhen Ledman	Total		18	1	1	0	0	0	0	0	19	1
Sichuan Jiuniu	2018	China League Two	6	0	2	0	-		-		8	0
Zhejiang Yiteng	2019	China League Two	14	4	1	1	-		-		15	5
Zhejiang Yiteng	2020	China League Two	8	0	-		-		-		8	0
Zhejiang Yiteng	Total		22	4	1	1	0	0	0	0	23	5
Career total			149	37	9	2	0	0	0	0	158	39

== Honours ==
=== Club ===
Qingdao Hainiu

- China League Two: 2013
