= Zhang Xingbo (footballer) =

Chinese association football player

Personal information
- Date of birth: 17 January 1994 (age 32)
- Place of birth: Shenyang, Liaoning, China
- Height: 1.72 m (5 ft 8 in)
- Positions: Left winger; left-back

Team information
- Current team: Foshan Nanshi
- Number: 13

Youth career
- –2011: Dongguan Nancheng

Senior career*
Years	Team	Apps	(Gls)
2011–2012	Dongguan Nancheng	44	(10)
2013–2014	Guangzhou Evergrande	0	(0)
2013	→ Meixian Hakka (loan)	10	(1)
2014	→ Taiyuan Zhongyou Jiayi (loan)		
2015–2016	Inner Mongolia Zhongyou	8	(0)
2015	→ Meixian Hakka (loan)	1	(0)
2016–2017	Meizhou Meixian Techand	26	(6)
2018–2020	Liaoning Shenyang Urban	53	(14)
2021–2022	Chongqing Liangjiang	16	(0)
2022	→ Zibo Cuju (loan)	11	(0)
2023	Shijiazhuang Gongfu	7	(0)
2023–	Foshan Nanshi	34	(0)
- * Club domestic league appearances and goals as of 14:01, 31 December 2022 (UTC)

Zhang Xingbo (Chinese: 张兴博; born 17 January 1994) is a Chinese footballer currently playing as a left winger or left-back for Foshan Nanshi.

== Career statistics ==
=== Club ===
As of 31 December 2024.

Club	Season	League			Cup		Continental		Other		Total	
Club	Season	Division	Apps	Goals	Apps	Goals	Apps	Goals	Apps	Goals	Apps	Goals
Dongguan Nancheng	2011	China League Two	–		0	0	–		0	0	45	11
Dongguan Nancheng	2012	China League Two	–		1 (Note: Appearances in the Chinese FA Cup)	1	–		0	0	45	11
Dongguan Nancheng	Total		44	10	1	1	0	0	0	0	45	11
Guangzhou Evergrande	2013	Chinese Super League	0	0	0	0	–		0	0	0	0
Guangzhou Evergrande	2014	Chinese Super League	0	0	0	0	–		0	0	0	0
Guangzhou Evergrande	Total		0	0	0	0	0	0	0	0	0	0
Meixian Hakka (loan)	2013	China League Two	10	1	1	0	–		0	0	11	1
Inner Mongolia Zhongyou	2015	China League One	8	0	1	0	–		0	0	9	0
Meixian Hakka (loan)	2015	China League Two	–		0	0	–		1 (Note: Appearances in the China League Two playoffs)	0	1	0
Meizhou Meixian Hakka/ Meizhou Meixian Techand	2016	China League Two	17	4	2	0	–		2	0	21	4
Meizhou Meixian Hakka/ Meizhou Meixian Techand	2017	China League Two	7	2	2	0	–		0	0	9	2
Meizhou Meixian Hakka/ Meizhou Meixian Techand	2018	China League One	0	0	0	0	–		0	0	0	0
Meizhou Meixian Hakka/ Meizhou Meixian Techand	Total		24	6	4	0	0	0	3	0	31	6
Liaoning Shenyang Urban	2018	China League Two	20	5	2	0	–		2	0	21	4
Liaoning Shenyang Urban	2019	China League Two	28	8	1	1	–		2	1	31	10
Liaoning Shenyang Urban	2020	China League One	1	0	0	0	–		0	0	1	0
Liaoning Shenyang Urban	Total		49	13	3	1	0	0	4	1	56	15
Chongqing Liangjiang Athletic	2021	Chinese Super League	16	0	2	0	–		–		18	0
Zibo Cuju (loan)	2022	China League One	11	0	0	0	–		–		11	0
Shijiazhuang Gongfu (loan)	2023	China League One	7	0	1	0	–		–		8	0
Dongguan United/ Foshan Nanshi	2023	China League One	16	0	–		–		–		16	0
Dongguan United/ Foshan Nanshi	2024	China League One	27	2	2	0	–		–		29	2
Dongguan United/ Foshan Nanshi	Total		43	2	2	0	0	0	0	0	45	2
Career total			202	32	15	2	0	0	7	1	224	35
