= Wei Xin =

Chinese footballer

Wei Xin 魏新
Personal information
- Full name: Wei Xin
- Date of birth: April 18, 1977 (age 49)
- Place of birth: Chongqing, Sichuan, China
- Height: 1.77 m (5 ft 10 in)
- Positions: Defender; midfielder

Youth career
- 1988–1993: Chongqing Tigong
- 1994–1995: Chongqing Yuhai

Senior career*
Years	Team	Apps	(Gls)
1996	Chongqing Jialing		
1997–2006	Chongqing Lifan	186	(8)

International career
2001–2006	China	30	(0)

Managerial career
- 2007–2009: Chongqing Lifan
- 2009: Chongqing Lifan (assistant)
- 2009–2010: Chongqing Lifan (caretaker)
- 2010: Chongqing Lifan (assistant)
- 2010: Chongqing Lifan (caretaker)
- 2013: Chongqing FC
- 2015: Fujian Broncos
- 2016: Nantong Zhiyun
- 2017–2019: Nantong Zhiyun
- 2020–2022: Chongqing Liangjiang Athletic (assistant)
- 2022–2023: Wuxi Wugou
- 2023: Jinan Xingzhou
Medal record
Representing China
Men's football
AFC Asian Cup
Silver medal – second place	2004 China	Team
East Asian Football Championship
Bronze medal – third place	2003 Japan	Team
- * Club domestic league appearances and goals

Wei Xin (Chinese: 魏新; pinyin: Wèi Xīn; born April 18, 1977, in Chongqing) is a Chinese football manager and former player. Before becoming a coach, he played professionally as a versatile defender or midfielder who predominantly represented Chongqing Lifan as well as the China national football team.

== Playing career ==
Wei Xin was inseparable from Chongqing throughout his entire football career playing for youth and then senior teams within the city. When Qianwei Huandao football club moved into the city and then later rename themselves Chongqing Lifan they would take on Wei Xin and give him the chance to play in the top tier of Chinese football. With this club he would become a vital member of the team and win the 2000 Chinese FA Cup, which was his greatest achievement with the club. This would lead to an international call-up where he would make his debut against North Korea on August 3, 2001, in a 2–2 draw. He would miss the 2002 FIFA World Cup, however his ability to play as a left back or midfield saw him able to return to the national team and be included in the 2004 AFC Asian Cup where he played a vital part in the teams runners-up position. Despite not even being thirty years old he was rewarded with his loyalty towards Chongqing with a coaching position, which he took seriously enough to end his playing career by the end of the 2006 league season.

== Management career ==
At the start of the 2007 league season Wei Xin was offered the head coach position within Chongqing Lifan; this made him the youngest coach in China's professional football history. His appointment required him to win promotion from the recently relegated side, which was something he achieved when he guided the team to a runners-up position at the end of the 2008 league season and promotion back into the Chinese Super League.

== Career statistics ==
=== International ===
All international A matches are counted

No	Date	China PR	Score	Opponent	Match	Venue
01	2001-08-03	China PR	2-2	(North Korea) Korea DPR	International Friendly Match	Shanghai
02	2001-10-19	China PR	0-1	Uzbekistan	FIFA World Cup 2002 Qualification	Tashkent
03	2003-02-12	China PR	0-0	Brazil	International Friendly Match	Guangzhou
04	2003-02-16	China PR	1-0	Estonia	International Friendly Match	Wuhan
05	2003-08-20	China PR	0-0	Chile	International Friendly Match	Tianjin
06	2003-08-31	China PR	3-4	Haiti	International Friendly Match	Fort Lauderdale
07	2003-09-07	China PR	0-2	Costa Rica	International Friendly Match	Fort Lauderdale
08	2003-12-04	China PR	0-2	Japan	EAFF East Asian Cup 2003	Tokyo
09	2003-12-10	China PR	3-1	Hong Kong	EAFF East Asian Cup 2003	Yokohama
10	2004-01-27	China PR	0-0	(North Macedonia) Macedonia	International Friendly Match	Shanghai
11	2004-01-29	China PR	1-0	(North Macedonia) Macedonia	International Friendly Match	Shanghai
12	2004-02-03	China PR	2-1	Finland	International Friendly Match	Guangzhou
13	2004-02-18	China PR	1-0	Kuwait	FIFA World Cup 2006 Qualification	Guangzhou
14	2003-03-17	China PR	2-0	Myanmar	International Friendly Match	Guangzhou
15	2004-03-31	China PR	1-0	Hong Kong	FIFA World Cup 2006 Qualification	Hong Kong
16	2004-04-14	China PR	0-0	Andorra	International Friendly Match	Peralada
17	2004-04-28	China PR	1-0	Algeria	International Friendly Match	Clermont-Ferrand
18	2004-06-09	China PR	4-0	Malaysia	FIFA World Cup 2006 Qualification	Tianjin
19	2004-07-03	China PR	6-0	Lebanon	International Friendly Match	Chongqing
20	2004-07-10	China PR	2-2	United Arab Emirates	International Friendly Match	Hohhot
21	2004-07-17	China PR	2-2	Bahrain	AFC Asian Cup 2004	Beijing
22	2004-07-21	China PR	5-0	Indonesia	AFC Asian Cup 2004	Beijing
23	2004-07-30	China PR	3-0	Iraq	AFC Asian Cup 2004	Beijing
24	2004-08-07	China PR	1-3	Japan	AFC Asian Cup 2004	Beijing
25	2004-09-08	China PR	1-0	Malaysia	FIFA World Cup 2006 Qualification	Penang
26	2004-10-13	China PR	0-1	Kuwait	FIFA World Cup 2006 Qualification	Kuwait
27	2004-11-17	China PR	7-0	Hong Kong	FIFA World Cup 2006 Qualification	Guangzhou
28	2005-03-26	China PR	0-3	Spain	International Friendly Match	Salamanca
29	2005-03-29	China PR	0-1	Republic of Ireland	International Friendly Match	Dublin
30	2005-06-19	China PR	2-2	Costa Rica	International Friendly Match	Changsha

== Honours ==
=== Player ===
==== Club ====
- 1995 – China City Games 5th
- 1998-2001 – China Super League 4th
- 2000 – Philips Chinese FA Cup

==== International ====
- 2004 – AFC Asian Cup Runner-up
