= Wuhua County Stadium =

Multi-purpose stadium in Meizhou, Guangdong, China

Coordinates: 23.9323°N 115.7758°E

Wuhua County Stadium 五华县体育场
- Interactive map of Wuhua County Stadium 五华县体育场
- Full name: Wuhua County Stadium 五华县体育场
- Location: Wuhua County, Guangdong, China
- Owner: Wuhua County People's Government
- Operator: Wuhua County Sports Bureau
- Capacity: 15,000
- Surface: Grass

Construction
- Opened: 1986
- Renovated: 2015

Tenant
- Meizhou Hakka

Wuhua County Stadium (Chinese: 五华县体育场) is a multi-purpose stadium in Wuhua County, Meizhou, Guangdong, China.

Wuhua County Stadium opened in 1986 for the football preliminaries of 1987 National Games of China. It became the home stadium of Meizhou Hakka in August 2013 for the 2013 China League Two. The stadium was renovated to meet the requirement of the league at the end of 2015 after Meizhou Hakka won promotion to China League One.
