= Jiangxi Olympic Sports Center =

Sports venue in Nanchang, Jiangxi, China

Coordinates: 28°40′28″N 116°01′24″E

Jiangxi Olympic Sports Centre Stadium
- Nanchang Stadium
- Interactive map of Jiangxi Olympic Sports Centre Stadium
- Full name: Jiangxi Olympic Sports Center Stadium
- Location: Nanchang, China
- Capacity: 50,000
- Public transit: 1 at Olympic Stadium

Construction
- Opened: 2010

Jiangxi Olympic Sports Centre Stadium also known as Nanchang Olympic Stadium is a multi-purpose stadium in Nanchang, China. It is currently used mostly for football matches.

It opened in 2010.
