= Liu Zhongchang =

Chinese footballer and manager

Liu Zhongchang 柳忠长
Personal information
- Date of birth: 31 August 1962 (age 64)
- Place of birth: Dalian, Liaoning, China
- Height: 1.75 m (5 ft 9 in)
- Position: Forward

Youth career
- 1974–1976: Dalian
- 1976: Liaoning

Senior career*
Years	Team	Apps	(Gls)
1978–1987	Liaoning		
1988–1992	Dalian		
1994–1995	Dalian Wanda	30	(2)
1996	Shaanxi Guoli		
1996	Shenzhen Jinpeng		

International career
1980	China U-20		
1985–1986	China	4	(1)

Managerial career
- 1992: Dalian Youth
- 1992: Dalian W.F.C.
- 2001: Dalian W.F.C.
- 2005: Sichuan First City
- 2006–2012: Dalian Shide (assistant)
- 2010: Dalian Shide (caretaker)
- 2011–2012: Dalian Shide W.F.C.
- 2014–2016: Dalian Transcendence
Medal record
Men's football
Representing China
University Games
Bronze medal – third place	1985 Kobe	Football
- * Club domestic league appearances and goals as of 11 February 2022

Liu Zhongchang (simplified Chinese: 柳忠长; traditional Chinese: 柳忠長; pinyin: Liǔ Zhōngcháng; born 31 August 1962) is a Chinese former football player and current manager.

== Club career ==
Liu entered Dalian youth team in 1974. He moved to Liaoning youth team in 1976. Between 1983 and 1987, he played for Liaoning.

In 1988, he returned to Dalian. Dalian relegated in the 1988 season and faced poor performance in the 1989 season. Liu was moved from forward to midfielder by Qi Wusheng, and had outrageous performance. Dalian promoted in the 1989 season as runner-up.

In 1992, he decided to retire. He was recruited by Dalian Wanda in 1993 season, and after hard training, he was able to pass the stamina test, to play for the team between 1994 and 1995, and won Dalian Wanda's first professional league champion.

In 1996, he retired again, and started to work as manager for Shaanxi Guoli. He also played for Shenzhen Jinpeng in the 1996 Jia-B League.

== International career ==
In 1986, Liu participated in the Asian Games representing China. In the 5–1 victory against Bahrain, he scored a goal.

== Managerial career ==
In 2001, he became the manager of Dalian Women's FC.

In 2002, he joined Sichuan Better City as assistant manager. He became the manager in the 2005 season. The team was dissolved after that season.

Between 2006 and 2012, he worked at Dalian Shide as assistant manager for the first team and women's team. In 2010, he shortly took the caretaker position for Dalian Shide after Xu Hong was sacked.

In 2013, Liu joined the newly established Dalian Transcendence in the China League Two. The team gained promotion into the China League One in 2015. He resigned in 2016 due to poor performances in the League One.

In 2017, he joined Zhejiang Yiteng and worked as team official. He joined Dalian Yifang during the season as team official. In the 2018 season, he left the team as Ma Lin was sacked.

== Managerial statistics ==
Team	From	To	Record					Ref.
Team	From	To	P	W	D	L	Win %	Ref.
Sichian First City	2005	2005	25	8	6	11	32	
Dalian Shide	2010	2010	3	1	1	1	33	
Dalian Transcendence	2014	2016	45	24	15	6	53.3	
Total			73	33	22	18	45.2	

== Honors ==
=== Player ===
Liaoning FC

- Chinese Jia-A League: 1985, 1987
- Chinese FA Cup: 1984, 1986

Dalian

- Chinese FA Cup: 1992

Dalian Wanda

- Chinese Jia-A League: 1994
