= Fujian Broncos F.C. =

Chinese football club

Fujian Broncos 福建超越
- Full name: Fujian Broncos Football Club 福建超越足球俱乐部
- Founded: 18 January 2013; 13 years ago
- Ground: Jinjiang, Fujian

Fujian Broncos Football Club was a professional football club from Quanzhou, China, that most recently competed in China League Two.

== History ==
Quanzhou Broncos F.C. was established in 2013. On 6 March 2014, they changed their name to Fujian Broncos and enrolled in the 2014 China League Two. After playing there for two seasons, the club had to sell their Chinese FA registration and entire first-team to Jiangsu Yancheng Dingli F.C. After selling the first team, in 2017, the club played with a Team of 19–20-year-old players, and won the Quanzhou group of Fujian Super League, under the Portuguese coach Mauro Jerónimo. However, in the final stages of the league, the team was disqualified for disobedience to referees in their game against Fujian Tianxin.

In 2016, the team withdrew from the professional game, focusing solely on youth football.

== Name history ==
- 2013–2014 Quanzhou Broncos F.C. 泉州超越
- 2014– Fujian Broncos F.C. 福建超越

== Managerial history ==
- (China) Zhang Yuning (2014)
- (China) Wei Xin (2015)
- (Portugal) Mauro Jerónimo (2016–2017)

== Results ==
All-time league rankings

As of the end of 2015 season.

Year	Div	Pld	W	D	L	GF	GA	GD	Pts	Pos.	FA Cup	Super Cup	AFC	Att./G	Stadium
2014	3	16	0	3	13	3	38	−35	3	9^{1}	DNE	DNQ	DNQ		Jinjiang Sports Center Stadium
2015	3	14	2	1	11	11	41	−40	7	8^{1}	R1	DNQ	DNQ	585	Jinjiang Sports Center Stadium

- ^1 in South Group.

Key

	China top division
	China second division
	China third division
W	Winners
RU	Runners-up
3	Third place
	Relegated

- Pld = Played
- W = Games won
- D = Games drawn
- L = Games lost
- F = Goals for
- A = Goals against
- Pts = Points
- Pos = Final position
- DNQ = Did not qualify
- DNE = Did not enter
- NH = Not Held
- – = Does Not Exist
- R1 = Round 1
- R2 = Round 2
- R3 = Round 3
- R4 = Round 4
- F = Final
- SF = Semi-finals
- QF = Quarter-finals
- R16 = Round of 16
- Group = Group stage
- GS2 = Second Group stage
- QR1 = First Qualifying Round
- QR2 = Second Qualifying Round
- QR3 = Third Qualifying Round
