= Sichuan Leaders F.C. =

Chinese football club

Sichuan Leaders
- Full name: Sichuan Leaders Football Club 四川力达士足球俱乐部
- Founded: 2013
- Dissolved: 2015
- Ground: Dujiangyan Sports Centre Stadium, Dujiangyan
- Capacity: 12,700
- League: China League Two

Sichuan Leaders Football Club (Chinese: 四川力达士) is a China League Two club. It is an association football club from Dujiangyan City. The Sichuan Leaders was a new entry in the 2014 China League Two. The Dujiangyan Sports Centre Stadium is their home venue.

In 2015 Sichuan Leaders failed to participate in China League Two due to wage arrears.

In January 2019 the registration of Sichuan Leaders F.C. was cancelled due to its failure to attend annual inspection for 2014 to 2016 as required.

== Results ==
- As of the end of 2014 season

All-time League rankings

Season	2014
Division	3
Position	7^{1}

- ^Note 1 : in South League
