= 2014 China League Two =

China League Two
- Season: 2014
- Champions: Jiangxi Liansheng
- Promoted: Jiangxi Liansheng; Taiyuan Zhongyou Jiayi; Guizhou Zhicheng
- Matches: 142
- Goals: 349 (2.46 per match)
- Top goalscorer: Ye Chugui (10 goals)
- Biggest home win: Dalian Transcendence 6-0 Hebei Elite (Aug. 10th, 2014); Jiangxi Liansheng 6-0 Fujian Broncos (Aug. 23rd, 2014); Taiyuan Zhongyou Jiayi 6-0 Hebei Elite (Sept. 6th, 2014) (6 goals)
- Biggest away win: Sichuan Leaders 0-7 Meizhou Kejia (May 17th, 2014) (7 goals)
- Highest scoring: Sichuan Leaders 0-7 Meizhou Kejia (May 17th, 2014); Fujian Broncos 2-5 Meixian Hakka (Aug. 30th, 2014) (7 goals)
- Longest winning run: Meizhou Kejia (7 matches)
- Longest unbeaten run: Jiangxi Liansheng (14 matches)
- Longest winless run: Fujian Broncos (16 matches)
- Longest losing run: Fujian Broncos; Pu'er Wanhao (7 matches)

The 2014 Chinese Football Association Division Two League season was the 25th season since its establishment in 1989. It was divided into two groups, North and South. There were 17 teams participating in the league, 8 teams in North Group and 9 teams in South Group. The league was made up of two stages, the group stage and the play-off. The group stage was a double round-robin format. Each team in the group played the other teams twice, home and away. It started on April 26 and ended on September 13. The play-off stage was a two-legged elimination. It started on September 27. At the end of the season, the two finalists of the play-off qualified for promotion to 2015 China League One.

== Team changes ==
=== Promotion and relegation ===
Teams promoted to 2014 China League One

- Qingdao Hainiu
- Hebei Zhongji

Teams relegated from 2013 China League One

- Guizhou Zhicheng

=== Dissolved entries ===
- Chongqing F.C.
- Gansu Aoxin
- Dali Ruilong
- Liaoning Youth
- Qinghai Senke
- Shaanxi Laochenggen
- Shenzhen Fengpeng

=== New entries ===
- Dalian Transcendence
- Fujian Broncos
- Hebei Elite
- Nanjing Qianbao
- Pu'er Wanhao
- Sichuan Leaders
- Sichuan Longfor
- Yinchuan Helanshan

=== Name changes ===
- Shanxi Jiayi changed its name to Taiyuan Zhongyou Jiayi in January 2014.

== Clubs ==
Groups	Club	Head coach	City	Stadium	Capacity	2013 season
North	Dalian Transcendence	(China) Liu Zhongchang	Dalian	Jinzhou Stadium	30,776	New
North	Hebei Elite	(China) Sui Mingyun	Qinhuangdao	Qinhuangdao Olympic Sports Center Stadium	33,572	New
North	Tianjin Huochetou	(China) Su Wei	Tianjin	Tianjin Huochetou Stadium	12,000	North, 6th
North	Nanjing Qianbao	(China) Zhao Faqing	Nanjing (playing in Huai'an)	Huai'an Sports Center Stadium	30,000	New
North	Shandong Tengding	(China) Luo Dengren	Tengzhou (playing in Zibo)	Qi Capital Culture Sports City Stadium	17,000	CL2, 4th
North	Shenyang Dongjin	(China) Yang Yumin	Shenyang	Shenyang Urban Construction University Stadium	5,000	North, 5th
North	Taiyuan Zhongyou Jiayi	(China) Wang Bo	Taiyuan	Shanxi Sports Centre Stadium	62,000	-
North	Yinchuan Helanshan	(Spain) Abraham García	Yinchuan	Helan Mountain Stadium	39,872	New
South	Fujian Broncos	(China) Zhang Yuning	Quanzhou (playing in Jinjiang)	Jinjiang Sports Center Stadium	15,000	New
South	Guizhou Zhicheng ^{R}	(China) Zhang Jun	Guiyang	Guizhou Provincial Stadium	18,000	CL1, 16th
South	Jiangxi Liansheng	(China) Li Xiao	Nanchang	Jiangxi Olympic Sports Center	50,000	South, 5th
South	Lijiang Jiayunhao	(China) Li Hu	Lijiang	Lijiang Sports Development Centre Stadium	20,000	South, 3rd
South	Meixian Hakka	(Japan) Tomoo Tsukoshi	Meizhou	Meixian Tsang Hin-chi Stadium	20,221	South, 4th
South	Meizhou Kejia	(China) Cao Yang	Wuhua	Wuhua County Stadium	6,800	South, 1st
South	Pu'er Wanhao	(China) Zhang Biao	Pu'er (playing in Mengzi and Kunming)	Honghe University Stadium; Hongta Sport Center #4 Field	5,000	New
South	Sichuan Leaders	(China) Hu Yijun	Chengdu (playing in Dujiangyan)	Dujiangyan Phoenix Stadium	12,700	New
South	Sichuan Longfor	(China) Jia Jin	Santai	Santai County Stadium	8,000	New

== Clubs Locations ==
Location of teams in 2014 China League Two

== Group stage standings ==
=== North Group ===
Pos	Team	Pld	W	D	L	GF	GA	GD	Pts	Qualification or relegation
1	Taiyuan Zhongyou Jiayi (P, Q)	14	10	3	1	25	4	+21	33	Qualification for Play-offs
2	Nanjing Qianbao (Q)	14	9	1	4	17	8	+9	28	Qualification for Play-offs
3	Dalian Transcendence (Q)	14	7	6	1	27	9	+18	27 (Note: Dalian 2-0 Yinchuan; Yinchuan 0-2 Dalian)	Qualification for Play-offs
4	Yinchuan Helanshan (Q)	14	8	3	3	19	8	+11	27	Qualification for Play-offs
5	Shenyang Dongjin	14	5	2	7	16	25	−9	17	
6	Hebei Elite	14	2	3	9	14	31	−17	9	
7	Tianjin Huochetou	14	2	2	10	7	22	−15	8	
8	Shandong Tengding	14	2	2	10	10	28	−18	5 (Note: 3 points deducted)	Disbanded after season

Updated to match(es) played on Sept. 13, 2014. Source: CL2 website on sohu.com (in Chinese)
Rules for classification: 1) points; 2) head-to-head points; 3) head-to-head goal difference; 4) head-to-head goals scored; 5) goal difference; 6) number of goals scored.
(P) Promoted to China League One; (Q) Qualification for play-offs

=== South Group ===
Pos	Team	Pld	W	D	L	GF	GA	GD	Pts	Qualification or relegation
1	Meizhou Kejia (Q)	16	14	0	2	45	7	+38	42	Qualification for Play-offs
2	Guizhou Zhicheng (Q, P)	16	11	3	2	35	9	+26	36	Qualification for Play-offs
3	Jiangxi Liansheng (C, P, Q)	16	10	4	2	25	9	+16	34	Qualification for Play-offs
4	Lijiang Jiayunhao (Q)	16	7	5	4	20	14	+6	26	Qualification for Play-offs
5	Meixian Hakka	16	7	4	5	25	20	+5	25	
6	Sichuan Longfor	16	5	3	8	14	23	−9	18	
7	Sichuan Leaders	16	3	2	11	10	34	−24	11	Disbanded after season
8	Pu'er Wanhao	16	1	4	11	3	26	−23	7	
9	Fujian Broncos	16	0	3	13	3	38	−35	3	

Updated to match(es) played on Sept. 13, 2014. Source: CL2 website on sohu.com (in Chinese)
Rules for classification: 1) points; 2) head-to-head points; 3) head-to-head goal difference; 4) head-to-head goals scored; 5) goal difference; 6) number of goals scored.
(C) Champions; (P) Promoted to China League One; (Q) Qualification for play-offs

== Group stage results ==
=== North Group ===
Home \ Away	DLT	HBE	TJH	NJQ	SDT	SYD	TYZ	YCH
Dalian Transcendence		6–0	0–2	1–0	1–1	4–2	0–0	2–0
Hebei Elite	0–0		1–1	1–3	0–0	4–2	1–3	0–1
Tianjin Huochetou	1–4	3–2		0–2	0–3	0–1	0–2	0–0
Nanjing Qianbao	0–0	1–0	2–0		1–0	2–0	0–1	1–0
Shandong Tengding	0–4	2–4	1–0	0–3		1–2	0–1	0–3 (Note: Due to the strike, Shandong Tengding was sentenced to lose 0:3.)
Shenyang Dongjin	2–2	2–1	1–0	1–2	2–1		0–2	1–1
Taiyuan Zhongyou Jiayi	1–1	6–0	2–0	2–0	3–0	1–0		0–1
Yinchuan Helanshan	0–2	1–0	1–0	2–0	4–1	4–0	1–1	

Updated to match(es) played on Sept. 13th, 2014. Source: China League Two Results on 7m.cn (in Chinese)
Legend: Blue = home team win; Yellow = draw; Red = away team win.

=== South Group ===
Home \ Away	FJB	GZZ	JXL	LJJ	MXH	MZK	PEW	LDS	SLF
Fujian Broncos		0–3	0–1	0–5	2–5	1–3	0–0	0–2	0–0
Guizhou Zhicheng	4–0		2–0	2–0	1–1	2–1	4–0	2–2	2–1
Jiangxi Liansheng	6–0	2–1		0–0	2–1	1–0	1–0	2–0	1–0
Lijiang Jiayunhao	2–0	0–0	1–1		3–1	0–2	2–1	3–2	2–1
Meixian Hakka	2–0	1–5	1–1	3–0		0–3	1–0	3–0	3–1
Meizhou Kejia	3–0	1–0	2–1	1–0	2–1		5–0	5–0	4–0
Pu'er Wanhao	0–0	0–3	0–3	0–0	0–0	0–1		1–2	0–2
Sichuan Leaders	1–0	0–2	0–2	0–0	0–2	0–7	0–1		0–1
Sichuan Longfor	1–0	0–2	1–1	0–2	0–0	1–5	2–0	3–1	

Updated to match(es) played on Sept. 13th, 2014. Source: China League Two Results on 7m.cn (in Chinese)
Legend: Blue = home team win; Yellow = draw; Red = away team win.

== Play-offs ==
=== Quarter-finals ===
Team 1	Agg.	Team 2	1st leg	2nd leg
Lijiang Jiayunhao	1 - 2	Taiyuan Zhongyou Jiayi	1 - 1	0 - 1
Dalian Transcendence	3 - 3	Guizhou Zhicheng	3 - 2	0 - 1
Yinchuan Helanshan	1 - 4	Meizhou Kejia	1 - 0	0 - 4
Jiangxi Liansheng	3 - 2	Nanjing Qianbao	3 - 1	0 - 1

==== First leg ====
Sept. 27th, 2014
15:00 UTC+8

Lijiang Jiayunhao	1 - 1	Taiyuan Zhongyou Jiayi
Zhang Shuang 20'	Report	90' Deng Hanwen

Lijiang Sports Center Stadium, Lijiang
Referee: Hei Xiaohu

Sept. 27th, 2014
15:00 UTC+8

Dalian Transcendence	3 - 2	Guizhou Zhicheng
Han Jiabao 34'; Hu Zhaojun 42' (pen.); Fan Zhiqiang 71'	Report	76' Yang Jian; 90+' Feng Zhiquan

Jinzhou Stadium, Dalian
Referee: Shi Zhenlu

Sept. 27th, 2014
15:00 UTC+8

Yinchuan Helanshan	1 - 0	Meizhou Kejia
Wang Yunzhe 60'	Report

Helan Mountain Stadium, Yinchuan
Referee: Dong Kun

Sept. 27th, 2014
15:00 UTC+8

Jiangxi Liansheng	3 - 1	Nanjing Qianbao
Wang Yunlong 15'; Yang He; Yuan Mingcan	Report	44' Wei Renjie

Jiangxi Olympic Sports Center, Nanchang
Referee: Ai Kun

==== Second leg ====
Oct. 4th, 2014
15:00 UTC+8

Taiyuan Zhongyou Jiayi	1 - 0	Lijiang Jiayunhao
Hou Zhe 80'	Report

Shanxi Sports Centre Stadium, Taiyuan
Referee: Zhang Miao

Oct. 4th, 2014
15:00 UTC+8

Guizhou Zhicheng	1 - 0	Dalian Transcendence
Tang Yuan 16'	Report

Guizhou Provincial Stadium, Guiyang
Referee: Wang Zhe

Oct. 4th, 2014
15:00 UTC+8

Meizhou Kejia	4 - 0	Yinchuan Helanshan
Qin Sheng 9', 25', 51' (pen.); Jiang Zhongxiao 76'	Report

Wuhua County Stadium, Meizhou
Referee: Zhang Lei

Oct. 4th, 2014
15:00 UTC+8

Nanjing Qianbao	1 - 0	Jiangxi Liansheng
Fan Da	Report

Huai'an Sports Center Stadium, Huai'an
Referee: Zhao Zhizhi

=== Semi-finals ===
Team 1	Agg.	Team 2	1st leg	2nd leg
Jiangxi Liansheng	3 - 2	Meizhou Kejia	1 - 1	2 - 1
Guizhou Zhicheng	3 - 3 (4–5 p)	Taiyuan Zhongyou Jiayi	1 - 1	2 - 2

==== First leg ====
Oct. 11th, 2014
15:00 UTC+8

Jiangxi Liansheng	1 - 1	Meizhou Kejia
Qu Cheng 75'	Report	11' Ma Xiaolei

Jiangxi Olympic Sports Center, Nanchang
Referee: Wang Jin

Oct. 11th, 2014
15:00 UTC+8

Guizhou Zhicheng	1 - 1	Taiyuan Zhongyou Jiayi
Tang Yuan 63'	Report	23' Zhang Xingbo

Guizhou Provincial Stadium, Guiyang
Referee: Li Haihe

==== Second leg ====
Oct. 18th, 2014
15:00 UTC+8

Meizhou Kejia	1 - 2	Jiangxi Liansheng
Shi Liang 65'	Report	85' Ge Wei; 90+' Yang He

Wuhua County Stadium, Meizhou
Referee: Wang Zhe

Oct. 18th, 2014
15:00 UTC+8

Taiyuan Zhongyou Jiayi	2 - 2	Guizhou Zhicheng
Zhang Xingbo 15'; Zhao Zuojun 117'	Report	90+', 96' Ilhamjan Iminjan
Penalties
Zhao Zuojun (penalty scored); Hou Zhe (penalty scored); Luo Andong (penalty scored); Liu Tianqi (penalty scored); Yin Lu (penalty missed); Zhang Xingbo (penalty scored)	5 – 4	(penalty missed) Yang Jian; (penalty scored) Li Yingjian; (penalty scored) Tang Yuan; (penalty scored) Zhou Yi; (penalty scored) Ilhamjan Iminjan; (penalty missed) Jiang Liang

Shanxi Sports Centre Stadium, Taiyuan
Referee: Shi Zhenlu

=== Third-Place Match ===
Oct. 25th, 2014
15:00 UTC+8

Guizhou Zhicheng	2 - 0	Meizhou Kejia
Ilhamjan Iminjan 61'; Cai Chuchuan 65'	Report

Guizhou Provincial Stadium, Guiyang
Referee: Tan Hai

=== Final Match ===
Oct. 25th, 2014
15:00 UTC+8

Jiangxi Liansheng	2 - 0	Taiyuan Zhongyou Jiayi
Xian Tao; Wang Jianwen	Report

Jiangxi Olympic Sports Center, Nanchang
Referee: Hei Xiaohu

== Top scorers ==
Rank	Player	Club	Total
1	(China) Ye Chugui	Meixian Hakka	10
2	(China) Jiang Zhongxiao	Meizhou Kejia	9
3	(China) Wang Yunlong	Jiangxi Liansheng	8
3	(China) Ma Xiaolei	Meizhou Kejia	8
3	(China) Shi Liang	Meizhou Kejia	8
6	(China) Han Jiabao	Dalian Transcendence	7
6	(China) Ilhamjan Iminjan	Guizhou Zhicheng	7
6	(China) Li Yingjian	Guizhou Zhicheng	7
9	(China) Du Wenxiang	Dalian Transcendence	6
9	(China) Ouyang Xue	Guizhou Zhicheng	6
9	(China) Qu Cheng	Jiangxi Liansheng	6
9	(China) Gao Zhilin	Meizhou Kejia	6
9	(China) Zhang Xingbo	Taiyuan Zhongyou Jiayi	6
