= Hebei Zhuoao F.C. =

Chinese football club

Hebei Zhuoao 河北卓奥
- Full name: Hebei Zhuoao Football Club 河北卓奥足球俱乐部
- Founded: 2009; 16 years ago
- Dissolved: April 2022; 3 years ago
- 2021: League Two, 10th of 24
Home colours	Away colours

Hebei Zhuoao F.C. is defunct Chinese football club. They were based in Qinhuangdao, Hebei. The Chinese Football School Stadium was their home venue. It had partnership with Brazilian football club Olé Brasil Futebol Clube through youth programs, in which they sent selected, promising Chinese youth players to train abroad there.

== History ==
Hebei Jingying F.C. (Chinese: 河北精英足球俱乐部; lit. 'Hebei Elite F.C.') was established in 2009 by Hebei Jingying Group (Chinese: 河北精英集团).

It aims to contribute to the development of Chinese football through organizing programs to send selected Chinese youth players to Brazil to train abroad through their advanced methods, and sent out their first group of players in 2009.

In December 2010, the club signed a partnership contract with Brazilian side Olé Brasil Futebol Clube, a football club based in Ribeirão Preto, São Paulo and are known for its youth training programs, and sent out their second group of youth players to train abroad there.

After the return of their first group of players sent out in 2010, the club enrolled in 2014 China League Two, and has remained in the same level ever since.

In 2019, they changed their name to Hebei Aoli Jingying F.C. (Chinese: 河北奥利精英足球俱乐部).

The club was dissolved after 2021 season.

== Name history ==
Period	Chinese name	Pinyin	Transliteration / Meaning
2009–2018	河北精英足球俱乐部	Héběi Jīngyīng Zúqiú Jùlèbù	Hebei Elite F.C.
2019–2020	河北奥利精英足球俱乐部	Héběi Àolì Jīngyīng Zúqiú Jùlèbù	Hebei Aoli Jingying F.C.
2021	河北卓奥足球俱乐部	Héběi Àolì Jīngyīng Zúqiú Jùlèbù	Hebei Zhuoao F.C.

== Results ==
All-time league rankings

As of the end of 2019 season.

Year	Div	Pld	W	D	L	GF	GA	GD	Pts	Pos.	FA Cup	Super Cup	AFC	Att./G	Stadium
2014	3	14	2	3	9	14	31	-17	9	6^{1}	R1	DNQ	DNQ		Qinhuangdao Olympic Sports Center Stadium
2015	3	14	6	4	4	20	12	8	22^{1}	6	R2	DNQ	DNQ	267	Qinhuangdao Olympic Sports Center Stadium
2016	3	20	11	6	3	35	18	15	39	6	R1	DNQ	DNQ	423	Chinese Football School Stadium
2017	3	24	14	4	6	45	26	19	46	9	R2	DNQ	DNQ	379	Chinese Football School Stadium
2018	3	28	12	11	5	55	33	22	47	11	R2	DNQ	DNQ	376	Chinese Football School Stadium
2019	3	30	21	6	3	68	20	48	69	5	R4	DNQ	DNQ		Chinese Football School Stadium

- ^1 in North Group.

Key

	China top division
	China second division
	China third division
W	Winners
RU	Runners-up
3	Third place
	Relegated

- Pld = Played
- W = Games won
- D = Games drawn
- L = Games lost
- F = Goals for
- A = Goals against
- Pts = Points
- Pos = Final position
- DNQ = Did not qualify
- DNE = Did not enter
- NH = Not Held
- – = Does Not Exist
- R1 = Round 1
- R2 = Round 2
- R3 = Round 3
- R4 = Round 4
- F = Final
- SF = Semi-finals
- QF = Quarter-finals
- R16 = Round of 16
- Group = Group stage
- GS2 = Second Group stage
- QR1 = First Qualifying Round
- QR2 = Second Qualifying Round
- QR3 = Third Qualifying Round
