= Chengdu Qbao F.C. =

Chinese football club

Chengdu Qbao 成都钱宝
- Full name: Chengdu Qbao Football Club 成都钱宝足球俱乐部
- Founded: 24 January 2014; 11 years ago
- Dissolved: 1 March 2018; 7 years ago
- Website: https://web.archive.org/web/20180206115247/http://www.qbaofc.cn/

Chengdu Qbao Football Club (Chinese: 成都钱宝足球俱乐部) was a Chinese football club that participated in the China League Two division under licence from the Chinese Football Association (CFA). The team is based in Chengdu, Sichuan.

== History ==
The club was established by Qbao Group as Nanjing Qianbao F.C. on 24 January 2014. After a stellar 2015 season, they relocated to the city of Chengdu and changed their name to Chengdu Qbao F.C. on 8 January 2016. Chengdu Qbao withdrew from League Two in 2018 when Qbao Group was under investigation with illegal fund raising scandal.

== Name history ==
- 2014–2015 Nanjing Qianbao F.C. 南京钱宝
- 2016–2018 Chengdu Qbao F.C. 成都钱宝

== Managerial history ==
- (China) Zhao Faqing (2014–2016)
- (China) Zhang Weizhe (2017)
- (Spain) José Carlos Granero (2018)

== Results ==
All-time League Rankings

As of the end of 2017 season.

Year	Div	Pld	W	D	L	GF	GA	GD	Pts	Pos.	FA Cup	Super Cup	AFC	Att./G	Stadium
2014	3	14	9	1	4	17	8	9	28^{1}	6	DNE	DNQ	DNQ		Huai'an Sports Center Stadium
2015	3	14	6	6	2	32	16	16	24^{1}	4	R1	DNQ	DNQ	1,632	Wutaishan Stadium
2016	3	20	8	6	6	24	19	5	30	9	R3	DNQ	DNQ	1,442	Dujiangyan Stadium
2017	3	24	9	9	6	24	22	2	36	10	R2	DNQ	DNQ	762	Shuangliu Sports Centre Stadium

- ^1 In group stage.

Key

	China top division
	China second division
	China third division
	China fourth division
W	Winners
RU	Runners-up
3	Third place
	Relegated

- Pld = Played
- W = Games won
- D = Games drawn
- L = Games lost
- F = Goals for
- A = Goals against
- Pts = Points
- Pos = Final position
- DNQ = Did not qualify
- DNE = Did not enter
- NH = Not Held
- – = Does Not Exist
- R1 = Round 1
- R2 = Round 2
- R3 = Round 3
- R4 = Round 4
- F = Final
- SF = Semi-finals
- QF = Quarter-finals
- R16 = Round of 16
- Group = Group stage
- GS2 = Second Group stage
- QR1 = First Qualifying Round
- QR2 = Second Qualifying Round
- QR3 = Third Qualifying Round
