= Jiangxi Lushan F.C. =

Chinese football club

Jiangxi Lushan Jiāngxī Lúshān 江西庐山
- Full name: Jiangxi Lushan Football Club 江西庐山足球俱乐部
- Founded: 3 April 2002; 24 years ago (amateur); 23 February 2012; 14 years ago (professional)
- Ground: Ruichang Sports Park Stadium
- Capacity: 13,188
- Owner: Jiujiang Liansheng Group
- Chairman: Sun Jun
- Manager: Choi Jin-han
- League: China League Two
- 2025: China League Two, 9th of 24
Home colours	Away colours

Jiangxi Lushan Football Club (Chinese: 江西庐山足球俱乐部; pinyin: Jiāngxī Lúshān Zúqiú Jùlèbù) is a Chinese professional football club based in Ruichang, Jiangxi, that competes in China League Two, the third tier of Chinese football. Jiangxi Lushan plays its home matches at the Ruichang Sports Park Stadium, located within Ruichang. The club was founded in Jiujiang, Jiangxi, and they are owned by the Jiujiang Liansheng Group. The club name Lushan derives from Mount Lu.

== History ==
The club was established as an amateur club named Jiujiang Liansheng (Simplified Chinese: 九江联盛) on 3 April 2002 and was directly named after their owners the Jiujiang Liansheng Group. They played in the amateur leagues for ten years and claimed runners-up in the 2011 China Amateur Football League. On 23 February 2012, the club was reorganized as a professional football club and to represent this the owners changed the club's name to Jiangxi Liansheng to signify the city they would be representing. Their first season as a professional unit saw them enter the third tier of the Chinese football pyramid where in their debut season they finished eighth within their group. After three seasons within the division they won the league and gained promotion to the second tier by beating Taiyuan Zhongyou Jiayi 2–0 in the division final.

In February 2021, the club changed its name to Jiangxi Beidamen. In March 2023, the club changed its name to Jiangxi Lushan.

== Name history ==
- 2002–2012: Jiujiang Liansheng (九江联盛）
- 2012–2020: Jiangxi Liansheng (江西联盛)
- 2021–2022: Jiangxi Beidamen (江西北大门)
- 2023-:Jiangxi Lushan (江西庐山)

== Players ==
=== Current squad ===
As of 20 March 2026

Note: Flags indicate national team as defined under FIFA eligibility rules; some limited exceptions apply. Players may hold more than one non-FIFA nationality.

No.	Pos.	Nation	Player
1	GK	CHN	Liang Junjie
2	DF	CHN	He Quan (on loan from Shanghai Shenhua)
3	DF	CHN	Wang Hongbin
4	MF	CHN	Zhang Geeryi
5	DF	CHN	Shi Jiwei
6	MF	CHN	Liu Guoqiang
7	FW	CHN	Sun Yue
8	MF	CHN	Cao Enze
10	MF	CHN	Sabit Abdusalam
11	MF	CHN	Bai Zijian
12	GK	CHN	Li Chen
14	MF	CHN	Zhou Jingxiang
16	DF	CHN	Chen Yunhua

No.	Pos.	Nation	Player
17	DF	CHN	Li Chengguan
18	DF	CHN	Yang Pengju
19	DF	CHN	Jiang Hang
22	DF	CHN	Li Jiahao
24	DF	CHN	Li Yan
26	MF	CHN	Pi Ziyang
27	DF	CHN	Zhang Yanjun
28	GK	CHN	Li Tianle
30	MF	CHN	Huang Jianjian
33	FW	CHN	Guo Song

=== Reserve squad ===
Note: Flags indicate national team as defined under FIFA eligibility rules; some limited exceptions apply. Players may hold more than one non-FIFA nationality.

No. / Pos. / Nation / Player	No. / Pos. / Nation / Player

== Coaching staff ==
Position	Staff
Head coach	(South Korea) Choi Jin-han
Assistant coach	(China) Zhang Tianxiang

Source: Jiangxi Liansheng website

== Managerial history ==
- (China) Gu Mingchang (2012)
- (China) Li Xiao (2013–2014)
- (China) Huang Yan (2015)
- (China) Sun Wei (2015)
- (China) Song Lihui (2016)
- (China) Fan Yuhong (2017)
- (Croatia) Kazimir Vulić (2017–2018)
- (China) Huang Yong (2019–2022)
- (Brazil) Bene Lima (2022–2023)
- (China) Yu Ming (2023)
- (China) Li Zheng (2023–2024)
- (China) Yue Songtao (2024)
- (China) Wang Bo (2025)
- (China) Yue Songtao (2025)
- (China) Wang Weijia (2025)
- (South Korea) Choi Jin-han (2026–)

== Results ==
All-time league rankings

As of the end of 2019 season.

Year	Div	Pld	W	D	L	GF	GA	GD	Pts	Pos.	FA Cup	Super Cup	AFC	Att./G	Stadium
2009	4									5	NH	DNQ	DNQ		
2010	4									7	NH	DNQ	DNQ		
2011	4									RU	DNQ	DNQ	DNQ		
2012	3	24	6	12	6	36	32	4	30	8^{1}	DNQ	DNQ	DNQ	1,063	Jiangxi Olympic Sports Center
2013	3	12	2	6	4	9	14	−5	12	5^{1}	DNQ	DNQ	DNQ		Jiangxi Olympic Sports Center
2014	3	21	13	5	3	33	13	20	34^{1}	W	R2	DNQ	DNQ	1,200	Jiangxi Olympic Sports Center
2015	2	30	5	8	17	32	50	−18	23	16	R16	DNQ	DNQ	5,349	Jiangxi Olympic Sports Center
2016	3	23	10	11	2	31	20	11	41	3	R1	DNQ	DNQ	5,266	Jiujiang Stadium
2017	3	24	10	7	7	26	23	3	37	14	R3	DNQ	DNQ	1,636	Jiujiang Stadium
2018	3	28	7	10	11	36	37	−1	31	22	R2	DNQ	DNQ	5,000	Ruichang Sports Park Stadium
2019	3	30	19	4	7	41	21	20	61	6	R2	DNQ	DNQ		Ruichang Sports Park Stadium
2020	2	15	1	6	8	14	30	-16	9	18^{2}	DNQ	DNQ	DNQ		Ruichang Sports Park Stadium
2021	2	34	7	8	19	29	68	-39	29	14	R3	DNQ	DNQ		Ruichang Sports Park Stadium
2022	2	34	10	9	15	40	51	-11	33^{3}	14	R2	DNQ	DNQ		Ruichang Sports Park Stadium

- ^1 in group stage.
- ^2 Avoided relegation through play-off.
- ^3 6 points deducted due to unpaid salaries.

Key

	China top division
	China second division
	China third division
	China fourth division
W	Winners
RU	Runners-up
3	Third place
	Relegated

- Pld = Played
- W = Games won
- D = Games drawn
- L = Games lost
- F = Goals for
- A = Goals against
- Pts = Points
- Pos = Final position
- DNQ = Did not qualify
- DNE = Did not enter
- NH = Not Held
- – = Does Not Exist
- R1 = Round 1
- R2 = Round 2
- R3 = Round 3
- R4 = Round 4
- F = Final
- SF = Semi-finals
- QF = Quarter-finals
- R16 = Round of 16
- Group = Group stage
- GS2 = Second Group stage
- QR1 = First Qualifying Round
- QR2 = Second Qualifying Round
- QR3 = Third Qualifying Round

== Honours ==
- China League Two
  - Champions (1): 2014
