= Meizhou Hakka F.C. =

Meizhou Hakka 梅州客家
- Full name: Meizhou Hakka Football Club 梅州客家足球俱乐部
- Founded: 2013; 13 years ago
- Ground: Huitang Stadium, Wuhua
- Capacity: 27,000
- Head coach: Zhu Jiong
- League: China League One
- 2025: Chinese Super League, 15th of 16 (relegated)
Home colours	Away colours

Meizhou Hakka Football Club (simplified Chinese: 梅州客家足球俱乐部; traditional Chinese: 梅州客家足球俱樂部; pinyin: Méizhōu Kèjiā Zúqiú Jùlèbù; Hakka language: Mòi-Chû Hag-Ga chuk-khiù khî-lo̍k-phu) is a Chinese professional football club based in Wuhua, Meizhou, Guangdong, that competes in China League One, the second tier of Chinese football. Meizhou Hakka plays its home matches at the Huitang Stadium, located within Wuhua County. Their current majority shareholders are the Meizhou municipal government, Municipal Sports Bureau, Wei Real Estate Development Co. Ltd. and partners.

== History ==
Meizhou Hakka F.C. was established in January 2013 by former Guangdong Sunray Cave manager Cao Yang along with the support of the Meizhou municipal government, Municipal Sports Bureau. He would soon go on to gain financial support from the Chairman of Wei Real Estate Development Co., Ltd., Wei Jinping who was persuaded in investing into the team after Cao Yang described his envision of creating a footballing hub in Wuhua County, the home town of former Chinese footballer and coach Lee Wai Tong. The squad was assembled with local Hakka players and players from other teams in Guangdong, including Guangdong Sunray Cave, Guangzhou Evergrande, Shenzhen Ruby and Shenzhen Fengpeng before entering the third tier in the 2013 league season where despite topping the group stages they finished fifth in the knock-out stages.

Former Chinese national team head coach Qi Wusheng was brought in during the 2015 China League Two season. He would go on to help guide the club to win the division title in a penalty shoot-out against Dalian Transcendence and promotion to the second tier for the first time in the club's history. Qi Wusheng would not extend his contract with the club and Dutch football manager Luc Nijholt was brought in on 1 January 2016 as well as 80 million yuan to invest within the team. Luc Nijholt would leave the team on 19 July 2016 as the club sat twelfth within the league and marginally above the relegation zone, a position they would remain in for the rest of the season. After several managerial changes with limited success, Serbian manager Milan Ristić was brought in on 6 February 2021 and he was able to guide the team to promotion to the top tier at the end of the 2021 China League One season.

== Name history ==
According to the club's statement:

- 2013 Meizhou Kejia 梅州客家
- 2014– Meizhou Wuhua 梅州五华

According to official documents of CFA:

- 2013–2015 Meizhou Kejia 梅州客家
- 2016— Meizhou Hakka 梅州客家

== Current squad ==
=== First-team squad ===
As of July 2026

Note: Flags indicate national team as defined under FIFA eligibility rules; some limited exceptions apply. Players may hold more than one non-FIFA nationality.

No.	Pos.	Nation	Player
1	GK	CHN	Wang Zehao
3	DF	CHN	Liang Jiahao
5	DF	FRA	Théo Pellenard
6	DF	CHN	Wang Haoran
10	FW	CMR	Vinni Triboulet
12	GK	CHN	Sun Jianxiang
13	MF	CHN	Lai Jiantao
15	MF	CHN	Luo Hongbao
16	FW	CHN	Yang Chaosheng
17	FW	CHN	Yang Yihu
20	DF	CHN	Wen Zhanlin
22	DF	CHN	Liao Jiajun

No.	Pos.	Nation	Player
24	MF	MAR	Hamza Sakhi
25	MF	CHN	Li Jiarun
26	DF	HKG	Yu Wai Lim
27	MF	CHN	Zhang Enqi
28	MF	CHN	Li Weijia
29	DF	CHN	Sun Xiaobin
30	GK	CHN	Wang Hanyi (on loan from Shanghai Shenhua)
31	DF	CHN	Feng Gang
32	DF	CHN	Wen Qingcheng
33	MF	CHN	Zhu Baojie
34	MF	CHN	Zhang Jiajie
35	DF	CHN	Yang Yunbo
45	MF	CHN	Su Jiale

=== Reserve squad ===
Note: Flags indicate national team as defined under FIFA eligibility rules; some limited exceptions apply. Players may hold more than one non-FIFA nationality.

No. / Pos. / Nation / Player	No. / Pos. / Nation / Player

=== Out on loan ===
Note: Flags indicate national team as defined under FIFA eligibility rules; some limited exceptions apply. Players may hold more than one non-FIFA nationality.

No.	Pos.	Nation	Player

== Coaching staff ==
Position	Staff
Head coach	(China) Zhu Jiong
Assistant coach	(Portugal) Quim
Team Manager	(China) Liu Yintao

Source: CFA

=== Managerial history ===
- (China) Cao Yang (2013)
- (China) Tan Ende (2014–26 May 2015)
- (China) Zhang Jun (26 May 2015 – 3 July 2015)
- (China) Qi Wusheng (3 July 2015–31 Dec 2015)
- (Netherlands) Luc Nijholt (1 Jan 2016–19 Jul 2016)
- (China) Cao Yang (interim) (19 Jul 2016–31 Dec 2016)
- (Croatia) Vjekoslav Lokica (16 Feb 2017–29 Apr 2017)
- (China) Cao Yang (interim) (29 Apr 2017–23 Jul 2017)
- (Bulgaria) Aleksandar Stankov (23 Jul 2017–18 Dec 2017)
- (Bosnia and Herzegovina) Rusmir Cviko (18 Dec 2017–28 Aug 2018)
- (China) Li Weijun (interim) (28 Aug 2018–19 Dec 2018)
- (China) Zheng Xiaotian (19 Dec 2018–6 Nov 2019)
- (Brazil) Marcelo Rospide (12 Nov 2019–31 Dec 2020)
- (Serbia) Milan Ristić (2 Feb 2021–4 Jan 2024)
- (Spain) Pablo Villar (5 Jan 2024–20 May 2024)
- (China) Qu Gang (interim) (20 May 2024–12 Jun 2024)
- (Serbia) Milan Ristić (12 Jun 2024–30 Jun 2025)
- (China) Qu Gang (interim) (9 Jul 2025–31 Dec 2025)
- (Italy) Gino Lettieri (26 Jan 2026–26 Apr 2026)
- (China) Zhang Xiaorui (interim) (26 Apr 2026–5 June 2026)
- (China) Zhu Jiong (8 June 2026–Present)

== Honours ==
- China League Two (tier-III)
  - Champions (1): 2015

== Results ==
All-time league rankings

As of the end of 2024 season.

Year	Div	Pld	W	D	L	GF	GA	GD	Pts	Pos.	FA Cup	Super Cup	AFC	Att./G	Stadium
2013	3	12	9	3	0	30	6	24	30^{1}	5	DNE	DNQ	DNQ		Meixian Tsang Hin-chi Stadium; Wuhua County Stadium
2014	3	16	14	0	2	45	7	38	42^{1}	4	R3	DNQ	DNQ		Wuhua County Stadium
2015	3	14	9	3	2	39	13	26	30^{1}	W	R3	DNQ	DNQ	4,818	Wuhua County Stadium
2016	2	30	11	6	13	48	50	−2	39	12	R3	DNQ	DNQ	6,450	Wuhua County Stadium
2017	2	30	8	9	13	33	39	−6	33	12	R2	DNQ	DNQ	5,865	Wuhua County Stadium
2018	2	30	11	7	12	40	44	−4	40	9	R3	DNQ	DNQ	3,583	Wuhua County Stadium
2019	2	30	11	6	13	44	41	3	39	10	R3	DNQ	DNQ	5,984	Huitang Stadium
2020	2	15	8	4	3	27	16	11	28	5	R2	DNQ	DNQ		Huitang Stadium
2021	2	34	24	3	7	79	35	44	75	RU	R3	DNQ	DNQ		Huitang Stadium
2022	1	34	14	7	13	43	41	2	49	9	R3	DNQ	DNQ		Huitang Stadium
2023	1	30	9	7	14	42	54	−12	34	11	R4	DNQ	DNQ	15,004	Huitang Stadium
2024	1	30	6	9	15	29	55	−26	27	15	R4	DNQ	DNQ		Huitang Stadium

- ^1 In group stage.

Key

	China top division
	China second division
	China third division
W	Winners
RU	Runners-up
3	Third place
	Relegated

- Pld = Played
- W = Games won
- D = Games drawn
- L = Games lost
- F = Goals for
- A = Goals against
- Pts = Points
- Pos = Final position
- DNQ = Did not qualify
- DNE = Did not enter
- NH = Not Held
- – = Does Not Exist
- R1 = Round 1
- R2 = Round 2
- R3 = Round 3
- R4 = Round 4
- F = Final
- SF = Semi-finals
- QF = Quarter-finals
- R16 = Round of 16
- Group = Group stage
- GS2 = Second Group stage
- QR1 = First Qualifying Round
- QR2 = Second Qualifying Round
- QR3 = Third Qualifying Round
