= Tan Si =

Chinese footballer

Tan Si 谭斯
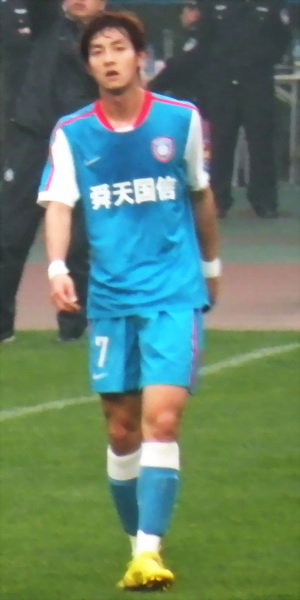

Personal information
- Full name: Tan Si
- Date of birth: 6 January 1987 (age 39)
- Place of birth: Yangzhou, Jiangsu, China
- Height: 1.88 m (6 ft 2 in)
- Position: Striker

Youth career
- Wuhan Guanggu

Senior career*
Years	Team	Apps	(Gls)
2005–2007	Wuhan Guanggu	17	(2)
2008–2011	Jiangsu Sainty	90	(23)
2012–2014	Wuhan Zall	34	(4)
2015–2017	Chengdu Qbao	38	(14)
2018–2020	Hunan Billows	42	(6)
- * Club domestic league appearances and goals as of 31 December 2020

Tan Si (simplified Chinese: 谭斯; traditional Chinese: 譚斯; pinyin: Tán Sī; born 6 January 1987) is a Chinese footballer currently playing as a striker.

== Club career ==
He would make his league debut coming on as a late substitute against Changsha Ginde F.C. in a 3–0 victory on October 30, 2005. Several weeks later he will score his first senior match goal against Shanghai Shenhua on November 15, 2005, in the Chinese Super League in 1–1 draw. Under the club's manager Pei Encai, Tan would gradually start to establish himself within the team, however due to a run of bad results Pei Encai would leave the club and his replacement Chen Fangping would decide to allow Tan to leave the club at the end of the 2007 Chinese Super League season.

Tan Si would transfer to second-tier club Jiangsu Sainty and be reunited with his previous manager Pei Encai, along with his teammates Ren Yongshun, Guo Mingyue and Li Zhuangfei in early 2008. He would gradually start to establish himself within the team and go on to score his first goal for the club in a league game on July 5, 2008, as well as also scoring his first ever hat-trick against Harbin Yiteng F.C. in a 5–2 win. Going on to become a vital member of the team Tan would go on to play in thirteen games and score ten goals to help Jiangsu Sainty in their promotion to the Chinese Super League. After winning the 2008 Chinese League One title Tan Si and Jiangsu Sainty enjoyed an impressive start to the 2009 Chinese Super League season, which saw him included in Gao Hongbo's senior team squad for several friendlies.

On 26 February 2015, Tan transferred to China League Two side Nanjing Qianbao on a free transfer.

On 9 March 2018, Tan transferred to League Two side Hunan Billows.

== Career statistics ==
Statistics accurate as of match played 31 December 2020.

Appearances and goals by club, season and competition
Club	Season	League			National Cup		Continental		Other		Total	
Club	Season	Division	Apps	Goals	Apps	Goals	Apps	Goals	Apps	Goals	Apps	Goals
Wuhan Guanggu	2005	Chinese Super League	2	1	0	0	-		-		2	1
Wuhan Guanggu	2006	Chinese Super League	12	1	0	0	-		-		12	1
Wuhan Guanggu	2007	Chinese Super League	3	0	-		-		-		3	0
Wuhan Guanggu	Total		17	2	0	0	0	0	0	0	17	2
Jiangsu Sainty	2008	China League One	13	10	-		-		-		13	10
Jiangsu Sainty	2009	Chinese Super League	28	8	-		-		-		28	8
Jiangsu Sainty	2010	Chinese Super League	25	4	-		-		-		25	4
Jiangsu Sainty	2011	Chinese Super League	24	1	1	0	-		-		25	1
Jiangsu Sainty	Total		90	23	1	0	0	0	0	0	91	23
Wuhan Zall	2012	China League One	22	4	1	1	-		-		25	4
Wuhan Zall	2013	Chinese Super League	9	0	1	0	-		-		10	0
Wuhan Zall	2014	China League One	3	0	0	0	-		-		3	0
Wuhan Zall	Total		34	4	2	1	0	0	0	0	36	5
Hunan Billows	2015	China League Two	18	9	1	0	-		-		19	9
Hunan Billows	2016	China League Two	3	0	2	2	-		-		5	2
Hunan Billows	2017	China League Two	17	5	1	0	-		-		18	5
Hunan Billows	Total		38	14	4	2	0	0	0	0	42	16
Hunan Billows	2018	China League Two	19	2	2	0	-		-		21	2
Hunan Billows	2019	China League Two	23	4	1	1	-		-		24	5
Hunan Billows	Total		42	6	3	1	0	0	0	0	45	7
Career total			221	49	10	4	0	0	0	0	231	53

== Honours ==
=== Club ===
Jiangsu Sainty

- China League One: 2008
