= 2017 China League Two =

China League Two
- Season: 2017
- Champions: Heilongjiang Lava Spring
- Promoted: Heilongjiang Lava Spring; Meizhou Meixian Techand
- Matches: 298
- Goals: 686 (2.3 per match)
- Top goalscorer: Ma Xiaolei (14 goals)
- Biggest home win: Shenzhen Ledman 5–0 Zhenjiang Huasa (May 20, 2017); Shenzhen Ledman 5–0 Shanghai JuJu Sports (Jul 29, 2017); Heilongjiang Lava Spring 6–1 Baotou Nanjiao (Aug 13, 2017) (5 goals)
- Biggest away win: Jilin Baijia 1–6 Hebei Elite (Jul 1, 2017); Shanghai Sunfun 0–5 Sichuan Longfor (Jul 16, 2017) (5 goals)
- Highest scoring: Beijing BIT 6–2 Baotou Nanjiao (Jun 10, 2017) (8 goals)
- Longest winning run: 7 matches Shenzhen Ledman
- Longest unbeaten run: 15 matches Qingdao Jonoon
- Longest winless run: 22 matches Zhenjiang Huasa
- Longest losing run: 11 matches Zhenjiang Huasa
- Highest attendance: 28,119; Shaanxi Chang'an Athletic 1–1 Dalian Boyoung (Jul 29, 2017)
- Lowest attendance: 56; Shanghai Sunfun 1–3 Chengdu Qbao (Sept 10, 2017)
- Average attendance: 2,692
- All statistics correct as of Nov 5, 2017.

The 2017 Chinese Football Association Division Two League season was the 28th season since its establishment in 1989. The league was expanded to 24 teams, with 12 teams in North Group and 12 teams in South Group.

== Team changes ==
=== To League Two ===
Teams relegated from 2016 China League One

- Qingdao Jonoon
- Hunan Billows

Teams entered from 2016 China Amateur Football League

- Dalian Boyang
- Shaanxi Chang'an Athletic
- Shanghai Sunfun
- Jilin Baijia
- Zhenjiang Huasa

=== From League Two ===
Teams promoted to 2017 China League One

- Lijiang Jiayunhao
- Baoding Yingli ETS

Team withdrawal

- Tianjin Huochetou

=== Name changes ===
- Meizhou Meixian Hakka F.C. changed its name to Meizhou Meixian Techand F.C. in December 2016.
- Shenzhen Renren F.C. changed its name to Shenzhen Ledman F.C. in December 2016.
- Hainan Boying & Seamen F.C. changed its name to Hainan Boying F.C. in January 2017.
- Dalian Boyang F.C. changed its name to Dalian Boyoung F.C. in February 2017.

== Clubs ==
=== Clubs and locations ===
Groups	Club	Head coach	City	Stadium	Capacity	2016 season
North	Qingdao Jonoon ^{R}	(China) Yin Tiesheng	Qingdao	Qingdao Tiantai Stadium	20,525	CL1, 15th
North	Yinchuan Helanshan	(China) Sun Wei	Yinchuan	Helan Mountain Stadium	39,872	5th
North	Hebei Elite	(China) Zhang Hui	Qinhuangdao	Chinese Football School Stadium	N/A	6th
North	Shenyang Urban	(China) Xiao Zhanbo	Shenyang	Shenyang Urban Construction University Stadium	12,000	8th
North	Heilongjiang Lava Spring	(China) Duan Xin	Harbin	Harbin ICE Sports Center	50,000	10th
North	Baotou Nanjiao	(Serbia) Branko Božović	Baotou	Baotou Olympic Sports Centre Stadium	40,545	12th
North	Beijing BIT	(Spain) Robert Ahufinger	Beijing	BIT Eastern Athletic Field	5,000	15th
North	Jiangsu Yancheng Dingli	(China) Wang Hongwei	Yancheng	Dafeng Olympic Sports Centre	10,000	18th
North	Shenyang Dongjin	(China) Wang Gang	Shenyang	Shenyang Urban Construction University Stadium	12,000	19th
North	Dalian Boyoung ^{P}	(China) Jiang Feng	Dalian	Jinzhou Stadium	30,775	CAL, 1st
North	Shaanxi Chang'an Athletic ^{P}	(China) Huang Hongyi	Xi'an	Shaanxi Province Stadium	50,000	CAL, 2nd
North	Jilin Baijia ^{P}	(Serbia) Zoran Kitanoski	Changchun	Nanling Stadium	42,000	CAL, 5th
South	Hunan Billows ^{R}	(Belgium) Patrick de Wilde	Changsha (playing in Yiyang)	Yiyang Olympic Sports Park Stadium	30,000	CL1, 16th
South	Jiangxi Liansheng	(Croatia) Kazimir Vulić (caretaker)	Jiujiang	Jiujiang Stadium	31,000	3rd
South	Sichuan Longfor	(Portugal) Manuel Cajuda	Dujiangyan	Dujiangyan Phoenix Stadium	12,700	4th
South	Meizhou Meixian Techand	(Hong Kong) Li Haiqiang	Meizhou	Meixian Tsang Hin-chi Stadium	20,221	7th
South	Chengdu Qbao	(China) Zhang Weizhe	Chengdu	Shuangliu Sports Centre Stadium	26,000	9th
South	Shenzhen Ledman	(China) Zhang Jun	Shenzhen	Bao'an Stadium	40,000	11th
South	Suzhou Dongwu	(China) Wei Dayong	Suzhou	Suzhou Sports Center	35,000	14th
South	Nantong Zhiyun	(China) Wei Xin	Rugao	Rugao Olympic Sports Center	15,000	16th
South	Hainan Boying	(Spain) Andoni Bombin Garrido	Haikou	Hainan Sport School Stadium	10,000	17th
South	Shanghai JuJu Sports	(Japan) Hajime Ishii	Shanghai	Kangqiao Football Base	N/A	20th
South	Shanghai Sunfun ^{P}	(China) Cheng Liang	Shanghai	Fengxian Chemical Industry Park Sports Centre Stadium	N/A	CAL, 4th
South	Zhenjiang Huasa ^{P}	(China) Li Xiao	Zhenjiang	Zhenjiang Sports and Exhibition Center	30,000	CAL, 6th

=== Clubs Locations ===
Location of teams in 2017 China League Two

=== Managerial changes ===
Club	Outgoing manager	Date of vacancy	Incoming manager	Date of appointment
Sichuan Longfor	(Portugal) Vítor Pontes	2 November 2016	(Portugal) Manuel Cajuda	5 December 2016
Meizhou Meixian Techand	(China) Wang Hongwei	9 November 2016	(Hong Kong) Li Haiqiang	9 November 2016
Yinchuan Helanshan	(Japan) Kazuo Uchida	11 November 2016	(China) Wang Haiming	15 November 2016
Heilongjiang Lava Spring	(Bulgaria) Zoran Janković	1 December 2016	(China) Duan Xin	1 December 2016
Chengdu Qbao	(China) Zhao Faqing	3 December 2016	(China) Zhang Weizhe	3 December 2016
Shenyang Dongjin	(South Korea) Lee Woo-hyung	4 December 2016	(China) Wang Gang	1 March 2017
Shenzhen Ledman	(China) Li Yuanping (caretaker)	14 December 2016	(China) Zhang Jun	14 December 2016
Suzhou Dongwu	(China) Tang Bo	24 December 2016	(Japan) Kazuo Uchida	1 January 2017
Jiangxi Liansheng	(China) Song Lihui	27 December 2016	(China) Fan Yuhong	27 December 2016
Shenyang Urban	(Poland) Marek Zub	31 December 2016	(China) Xiao Zhanbo	31 December 2016
Shanghai JuJu Sports	(Serbia) Radomir Koković	31 December 2016	(Serbia) Dragan Kokotović	1 January 2017
Hunan Billows	(China) Huang Xiangdong (caretaker)	31 December 2016	(China) Zhang Xu	1 January 2017
Jilin Baijia ^{P}	(China) Li Bin	31 December 2016	(Serbia) Zoran Kitanoski	1 January 2017
Hebei Elite	(China) Xu Tao	31 December 2016	(China) Zhang Hui	1 January 2017
Baotou Nanjiao	(France) David Camhi	14 January 2017	(China) Wang Hongwei	23 January 2017
Hainan Boying	(China) Li Xiao	20 January 2017	(China) Mai Chao	20 January 2017
Nantong Zhiyun	(China) Wei Xin	8 February 2017	(Croatia) Tomislav Stipić	11 February 2017
Nantong Zhiyun	(Croatia) Tomislav Stipić	17 April 2017	(China) Wei Xin	17 April 2017
Baotou Nanjiao	(China) Wang Hongwei	17 May 2017	(China) Fan Wenlong (caretaker)	17 May 2017
Jiangsu Yancheng Dingli	(China) Gao Fei	18 May 2017	(China) Wang Hongwei	18 May 2017
Yinchuan Helanshan	(China) Wang Haiming	23 May 2017	(China) Sun Wei	23 May 2017
Zhenjiang Huasa	(China) Li Dong	23 May 2017	(Serbia) Dragan Stančić (caretaker)	23 May 2017
Hunan Billows	(China) Zhang Xu	27 May 2017	(China) Li Hongwu (caretaker)	27 May 2017
Hainan Boying	(China) Mai Chao	9 June 2017	(Spain) Andoni Bombin Garrido	9 June 2017
Hunan Billows	(China) Li Hongwu (caretaker)	23 June 2017	(Belgium) Patrick de Wilde	23 June 2017
Baotou Nanjiao	(China) Fan Wenlong (caretaker)	6 July 2017	(Serbia) Branko Božović	6 July 2017
Shanghai JuJu Sports	(Serbia) Dragan Kokotović	14 July 2017	(Japan) Hajime Ishii	14 July 2017
Zhenjiang Huasa	(Serbia) Dragan Stančić (caretaker)	1 August 2017	(Canada) Goran Miscevic	1 August 2017
Jiangxi Liansheng	(China) Fan Yuhong	4 August 2017	(Croatia) Kazimir Vulić (caretaker)	4 August 2017
Suzhou Dongwu	(Japan) Kazuo Uchida	24 September 2017	(China) Wei Dayong (caretaker)	24 September 2017
Zhenjiang Huasa	(Canada) Goran Miscevic	5 October 2017	(China) Li Xiao	5 October 2017
Dalian Boyoung	(China) Chen Bo	11 October 2017	(China) Jiang Feng	11 October 2017

== League table ==
=== North Group ===
Pos	Team	Pld	W	D	L	GF	GA	GD	Pts	Promotion or relegation
1	Yinchuan Helanshan (Q)	22	14	3	5	34	14	+20	45	Qualification to Play-offs
2	Qingdao Jonoon (Q)	22	12	8	2	27	8	+19	44	Qualification to Play-offs
3	Heilongjiang Lava Spring (Q, C, P)	22	12	7	3	36	14	+22	43	Qualification to Play-offs
4	Shaanxi Chang'an Athletic (Q)	22	12	6	4	26	14	+12	42	Qualification to Play-offs
5	Hebei Elite	22	13	3	6	41	24	+17	42	9th–20th place Play-offs
6	Shenyang Urban	22	11	6	5	25	15	+10	39	9th–20th place Play-offs
7	Jiangsu Yancheng Dingli	22	6	7	9	21	30	−9	25	9th–20th place Play-offs
8	Beijing BIT	22	5	8	9	25	30	−5	23	9th–20th place Play-offs
9	Dalian Boyoung	22	4	8	10	19	31	−12	20	9th–20th place Play-offs
10	Jilin Baijia	22	3	10	9	15	28	−13	19	9th–20th place Play-offs
11	Shenyang Dongjin	22	1	7	14	11	34	−23	10	21st–24th place Play-offs
12	Baotou Nanjiao	22	2	1	19	14	52	−38	7	21st–24th place Play-offs

Updated to match(es) played on September 24, 2017. Source: fa.org.cn
Rules for classification: 1) Points; 2) Head-to-head points; 3) Head-to-head goal difference; 4) Head-to-head goals scored; 5) Goal difference; 6) Goals scored; 7) Disciplinary points (1 point for each yellow card, 3 points for each red card)
(C) Champions; (P) Promoted; (Q) Qualified for the phase indicated

=== South Group ===
Pos	Team	Pld	W	D	L	GF	GA	GD	Pts	Promotion or relegation
1	Shenzhen Ledman (Q)	22	16	4	2	49	12	+37	52	Qualification to Play-offs
2	Sichuan Longfor (Q)	22	14	5	3	37	16	+21	47	Qualification to Play-offs
3	Meizhou Meixian Techand (Q, P)	22	12	3	7	33	21	+12	39	Qualification to Play-offs
4	Nantong Zhiyun (Q)	22	11	5	6	22	15	+7	38	Qualification to Play-offs
5	Chengdu Qbao	22	9	8	5	22	18	+4	35	9th–20th place Play-offs
6	Suzhou Dongwu	22	10	5	7	24	15	+9	35	9th–20th place Play-offs
7	Jiangxi Liansheng	22	9	7	6	23	20	+3	34	9th–20th place Play-offs
8	Hunan Billows	22	8	4	10	28	28	0	28	9th–20th place Play-offs
9	Shanghai Sunfun	22	5	4	13	21	45	−24	19	9th–20th place Play-offs
10	Shanghai JuJu Sports	22	4	6	12	17	35	−18	18	9th–20th place Play-offs
11	Hainan Boying (O)	22	5	2	15	13	33	−20	17	21st–24th place Play-offs
12	Zhenjiang Huasa (O)	22	0	5	17	18	49	−31	5	21st–24th place Play-offs

Updated to match(es) played on September 24, 2017. Source: fa.org.cn
Rules for classification: 1) Points; 2) Head-to-head points; 3) Head-to-head goal difference; 4) Head-to-head goals scored; 5) Goal difference; 6) Goals scored; 7) Disciplinary points (1 point for each yellow card, 3 points for each red card)
(O) Play-off winners; (P) Promoted; (Q) Qualified for the phase indicated

=== Overall table ===
Pos	Team	Pld	W	D	L	GF	GA	GD	Pts	Promotion or relegation
1	Heilongjiang Lava Spring (C, P)	27	15	9	3	44	14	+30	54 (Note: Heilongjiang 3–0 Meixian)	China League One
2	Meizhou Meixian Techand (P)	27	15	4	8	39	27	+12	49	China League One
3	Yinchuan Helanshan	27	15	6	6	40	22	+18	51 (Note: Yinchuan 2–2 Shenzhen (7–6 P))	
4	Shenzhen Ledman	27	17	6	4	53	17	+36	57	
5	Qingdao Jonoon	24	12	9	3	29	11	+18	45 (Note: Qingdao 1 pts; -1; 2 goals Sichuan 1 pts; -1; 0 goal; 47 pts Shaanxi 1 pts; -1; 0 goal; 42 pts Nantong 1 pts; -2)	
6	Sichuan Longfor	24	14	6	4	37	17	+20	48	
7	Shaanxi Chang'an Athletic	24	12	7	5	26	15	+11	43	
8	Nantong Zhiyun	24	11	6	7	24	19	+5	39	
9	Hebei Elite	24	14	4	6	45	26	+19	46 (Note: Chengdu 1–1 Hebei; Hebei 3–1 Chengdu)	
10	Chengdu Qbao	24	9	9	6	24	22	+2	36	Disbanded after season
11	Suzhou Dongwu	24	12	5	7	28	16	+12	41 (Note: Suzhou 3–1 Shenyang U; Shenyang U 0–1 Suzhou)	
12	Shenyang Urban	24	11	6	7	26	19	+7	39	
13	Jiangsu Yancheng Dingli	24	7	7	10	24	33	−9	28 (Note: Jiangsu 2–0 Jiangxi; Jiangxi 3–1 Jiangsu)	
14	Jiangxi Liansheng	24	10	7	7	26	23	+3	37	
15	Beijing BIT	24	6	8	10	30	33	−3	26 (Note: Beijing BIT 4–1 Hunan; Hunan 2–1 Beijing BIT)	
16	Hunan Billows	24	9	4	11	31	33	−2	31	
17	Dalian Boyoung	24	6	8	10	26	31	−5	26 (Note: Shanghai S 0–3 Dalian; Dalian 4–0 Shanghai S)	
18	Shanghai Sunfun	24	5	4	15	21	52	−31	19	
19	Shanghai JuJu Sports	24	5	7	12	19	36	−17	22 (Note: Jilin 0–1 Shanghai J; Shanghai J 1–1 Jilin)	Disbanded after season
20	Jilin Baijia	24	3	11	10	16	30	−14	20	
21	Zhenjiang Huasa	24	2	5	17	22	50	−28	11 (Note: Zhenjiang 6 pts; Hainan 4 pts)	
22	Hainan Boying	24	6	3	15	15	33	−18	21	
23	Baotou Nanjiao (Note: Chengdu Qbao and Shanghai JuJu Sports dissolved, so Baotou Nanjiao and Shenyang Dongjin could stay at third level.) (T)	24	2	2	20	14	54	−40	8 (Note: Baotou 1 pts; Shenyang D 0 pts)	Relegation play-off declared null and void
24	Shenyang Dongjin (T)	24	1	7	16	12	38	−26	10	Relegation play-off declared null and void

Rules for classification: (Teams ranked 21st-22nd and 23rd-24th) 1) Points in playoffs; 2) Goal difference in playoffs; 3) Goals scored in playoffs; 4) Points in group stage; 5) Drawing of lots
(Teams ranked 5th-8th) 1) Points in playoffs; 2) Goal difference in playoffs; 3) Goals scored in playoffs; 4) Average points in group stage; 5) Drawing of lots
(C) Champions; (P) Promoted; (T) Not relegated

== Play-offs ==
=== 21st–24th place ===
Team 1	Agg.	Team 2	1st leg	2nd leg
Baotou Nanjiao	0–2	Hainan Boying	0–2	0–0
Zhenjiang Huasa	4–1	Shenyang Dongjin	2–0	2–1

7 October 2017
15:00

Baotou Nanjiao	0–2	Hainan Boying
		Song Xicun 18'; Huang Yabin 55'

Baotou Olympic Sports Centre Stadium, Baotou
Attendance: 2,035
Referee: Shi Zhenlu
14 October 2017
15:00

Hainan Boying	0–0	Baotou Nanjiao

Hainan Sport School Stadium, Haikou
Attendance: 1,268
Referee: Liang Caiwei

Hainan Boying won 2–0 on aggregate.

7 October 2017
15:00

Zhenjiang Huasa	2–0	Shenyang Dongjin
Song Qi 43'; Cheng Peng 53'

Zhenjiang Sports and Exhibition Center, Zhenjiang
Attendance: 378
Referee: Gu Chunhan
15 October 2017
14:30

Shenyang Dongjin	1–2	Zhenjiang Huasa
Wang Mian 11'		Yu Xiang 53', 90'

Shenyang Urban Construction University Stadium, Shenyang
Attendance: 108
Referee: Xing Qi

Zhenjiang Huasa won 4–1 on aggregate.

=== 19th–20th place ===
Team 1	Agg.	Team 2	1st leg	2nd leg
Jilin Baijia	1–2	Shanghai JuJu Sports	0–1	1–1 (a.e.t.)

7 October 2017
14:00

Jilin Baijia	0–1	Shanghai JuJu Sports
		Xiang Shuai 17'

Kalun Lake Stadium, Changchun
Attendance: 358
Referee: He Xin
14 October 2017
15:00

Shanghai JuJu Sports	1–1 (a.e.t.)	Jilin Baijia
Xu Jun		Zhang Bo 90'

Kangqiao Football Base, Shanghai
Attendance: 135
Referee: Liu Yang

=== 17th–18th place ===
Team 1	Agg.	Team 2	1st leg	2nd leg
Shanghai Sunfun	0–7	Dalian Boyoung	0–3	0–4

7 October 2017
15:00

Shanghai Sunfun	0–3	Dalian Boyoung
		Wang Shixin 66', 90+1'; Yin Liangyi 71' (pen.)

Fengxian Chemical Industry Park Sports Centre Stadium, Shanghai
Attendance: 100
Referee: Ding Chao
16 October 2017
15:00

Dalian Boyoung	4–0	Shanghai Sunfun
Ge Yuxiang 24'; Nan Yunqi 53', 63', 64'

Jinzhou Stadium, Dalian
Attendance: 266
Referee: Xiong Xing

=== 15th–16th place ===
Team 1	Agg.	Team 2	1st leg	2nd leg
Beijing BIT	5–3	Hunan Billows	4–1	1–2

7 October 2017
15:00

Beijing BIT	4–1	Hunan Billows
Li Sichen 9', 44'; Du Jinlong 78', 87'		Liu Shuai 39'

BIT Eastern Athletic Field, Beijing
Attendance: 518
Referee: Li Peng
14 October 2017
15:00

Hunan Billows	2–1	Beijing BIT
Zhang Hao 51', 88'		Yue Zhilei 83'

Yiyang Olympic Sports Park Stadium, Yiyang
Attendance: 312
Referee: Liu Xinyu

=== 13th–14th place ===
Team 1	Agg.	Team 2	1st leg	2nd leg
Jiangsu Yancheng Dingli	3–3 (a)	Jiangxi Liansheng	2–0	1–3

7 October 2017
15:00

Jiangsu Yancheng Dingli	2–0	Jiangxi Liansheng
Yi Baidi 28'; Wang Chaolong 66'

Dafeng Olympic Sports Centre, Yancheng
Attendance: 350
Referee: Wang Wei
14 October 2017
15:00

Jiangxi Liansheng	3–1	Jiangsu Yancheng Dingli
Yuan Mingcan 14'; Shen Tianfeng 15'; Wang Kang 45'		Yi Baidi 38'

Jiangxi Olympic Sports Center, Nanchang
Attendance: 384
Referee: Ning Zhaobing

=== 11th–12th place ===
Team 1	Agg.	Team 2	1st leg	2nd leg
Suzhou Dongwu	4–1	Shenyang Urban	3–1	1–0

7 October 2017
15:00

Suzhou Dongwu	3–1	Shenyang Urban
Dilmurat Batur 44'; Xiao Kun 65'; Li Haowen 70'		Zhu Junhui 73'

Suzhou Sports Center, Suzhou
Attendance: 1,530
Referee: Peng Bo
13 October 2017
14:30

Shenyang Urban	0–1	Suzhou Dongwu
		Bian Jun 44'

Shenyang Urban Construction University Stadium, Shenyang
Attendance: 121
Referee: Sun Shengyu

=== 9th–10th place ===
Team 1	Agg.	Team 2	1st leg	2nd leg
Chengdu Qbao	2–4	Hebei Elite	1–1	1–3

7 October 2017
15:00

Chengdu Qbao	1–1	Hebei Elite
Tan Si 90+3'		Wang Jinlei 27'

Dujiangyan Phoenix Stadium, Dujiangyan
Attendance: 210
Referee: Qin Xiaohan
14 October 2017
15:00

Hebei Elite	3–1	Chengdu Qbao
Wang Feike 33'; Han Zilong 90' (pen.); He Yuxuan 90+2'		Tan Si 41'

Chinese Football School Stadium, Qinhuangdao
Attendance: 221
Referee: Wang Yang

=== Quarter-finals ===
Team 1	Agg.	Team 2	1st leg	2nd leg
Nantong Zhiyun	2–4	Yinchuan Helanshan	2–2	0–2
Heilongjiang Lava Spring	1–0	Sichuan Longfor	0–0	1–0
Shaanxi Chang'an Athletic	0–1	Shenzhen Ledman	0–0	0–1
Meizhou Meixian Techand	3–2	Qingdao Jonoon	1–0	2–2

7 October 2017
15:00

Nantong Zhiyun	2–2	Yinchuan Helanshan
Hu Ming 26'; Ren Xinlong 66'		Zhou Liao 27', 50'

Nantong Sport School Stadium, Nantong
Attendance: 3,621
Referee: Li Haixin
14 October 2017
15:00

Yinchuan Helanshan	2–0	Nantong Zhiyun
Song Bo 71'; Tan Tiancheng 74'

Helan Mountain Stadium, Yinchuan
Attendance: 3,682
Referee: Liu Wei

Yinchuan Helanshan won 4–2 on aggregate.

7 October 2017
16:00

Heilongjiang Lava Spring	0–0	Sichuan Longfor

Harbin ICE Sports Center, Harbin
Attendance: 20,180
Referee: Lin Jun
14 October 2017
15:00

Sichuan Longfor	0–1	Heilongjiang Lava Spring
		Li Boyang 61'

Dujiangyan Phoenix Stadium, Dujiangyan
Attendance: 5,821
Referee: Niu Minghui

Heilongjiang Lava Spring won 1–0 on aggregate.

7 October 2017
15:00

Shaanxi Chang'an Athletic	0–0	Shenzhen Ledman

Weinan Sports Center Stadium, Weinan
Attendance: 13,869
Referee: Yu Bo
14 October 2017
16:00

Shenzhen Ledman	1–0	Shaanxi Chang'an Athletic
Yang Zi 55'

Bao'an Stadium, Shenzhen
Attendance: 6,531
Referee: Huang Yi

Shenzhen Ledman won 1–0 on aggregate.

7 October 2017
15:00

Meizhou Meixian Techand	1–0	Qingdao Jonoon
Ye Weichao 90+6'

Meixian Tsang Hin-chi Stadium, Meizhou
Attendance: 6,728
Referee: Huang Yejun
14 October 2017
15:00

Qingdao Jonoon	2–2	Meizhou Meixian Techand
Zhu Shiyu 2'; Wang Xiufu 78'		Yang Chen 35'; Gu Wenxiang 49'

Qingdao Tiantai Stadium, Qingdao
Attendance: 2,089
Referee: Zhen Wei

Meizhou Meixian Techand won 3–2 on aggregate.

=== Semi-finals ===
Team 1	Agg.	Team 2	1st leg	2nd leg
Heilongjiang Lava Spring	4–0	Yinchuan Helanshan	4–0	0–0
Meizhou Meixian Techand	3–1	Shenzhen Ledman	2–1	1–0

21 October 2017
15:00

Heilongjiang Lava Spring	4–0	Yinchuan Helanshan
Ren Jianglong 35'; Wang Ziming 59', 65', 86'

Harbin ICE Sports Center, Harbin
Attendance: 26,880
Referee: Guan Xing
28 October 2017
15:00

Yinchuan Helanshan	0–0	Heilongjiang Lava Spring

Helan Mountain Stadium, Yinchuan
Attendance: 3,216
Referee: Zhang Long

Heilongjiang Lava Spring won 4–0 on aggregate.

21 October 2017
15:00

Meizhou Meixian Techand	2–1	Shenzhen Ledman
Shen Feng 3'; Yang Chen 77'		Yang Bin 30'

Meixian Tsang Hin-chi Stadium, Meizhou
Attendance: 2,560
Referee: Lin Jun
28 October 2017
16:00

Shenzhen Ledman	0–1	Meizhou Meixian Techand
		Ye Weichao 90'

Bao'an Stadium, Shenzhen
Attendance: 4,951
Referee: Ma Li

Meizhou Meixian Techand won 3–1 on aggregate.

=== Third-Place Match ===
4 November 2017
16:00

Shenzhen Ledman	2–2 (a.e.t.)	Yinchuan Helanshan
Mai Sijing 16'; Liu Le 115'		Zhou Liao 20'; Zheng Zhihao 103'
Penalties
Liu Le (penalty scored) (penalty missed) (penalty scored) (penalty scored) (penalty scored); Wu Fei (penalty scored); Yang Jianfei (penalty scored); Mai Sijing (penalty missed)	6–7	(penalty missed) Yuan Weiwei; (penalty scored) Wang Xiao; (penalty scored) Tan Tiancheng (penalty scored) (penalty scored); (penalty scored) Wu Yuyin; (penalty scored) Xu Wenbin; (penalty scored) Chen Bo

Bao'an Stadium, Shenzhen
Referee: Tang Shunqi

=== Final Match ===
5 November 2017
13:30

Heilongjiang Lava Spring	3–0	Meizhou Meixian Techand
Li Shuai 14'; Wang Ziming 31'; Yang Chao 68' (o.g.)

Harbin ICE Sports Center, Harbin
Referee: Fu Ming

== Relegation play-off ==
Team 1	Agg.	Team 2	1st leg	2nd leg
Yanbian Beiguo	7–5	Baotou Nanjiao	2–1	5–4
Lhasa Urban Construction Investment	2–1	Shenyang Dongjin	2–0	0–1

22 October 2017
14:00

Yanbian Beiguo	2–1	Baotou Nanjiao
Cui Xudong 46'; Song Jian 84'		Liu Yuehai 39'

Hunchun People's Stadium, Hunchun
Attendance: 4,210
Referee: Zhen Wei
29 October 2017
14:30

Baotou Nanjiao	4–5	Yanbian Beiguo
Almjan Abdugheni 36', 55'; Lu Shuai 42'; Zheng Qiang 54' (pen.)		Song Jian 30', 49'; Cui Xudong 47', 61', 85'

Baotou Olympic Sports Centre Stadium, Baotou
Attendance: 2,121
Referee: Liu Shaocheng

Yanbian Beiguo won 7–5 on aggregate.

22 October 2017
15:00

Lhasa Urban Construction Investment	2–0	Shenyang Dongjin
Xie Weijun 30'; Liu Teng 75' (pen.)

Huizhou Olympic Stadium, Huizhou
Attendance: 186
Referee: Liang Songshang
29 October 2017
14:00

Shenyang Dongjin	1–0	Lhasa Urban Construction Investment
Han Weichen 90'

Shenyang Urban Construction University Stadium, Shenyang
Attendance: 284
Referee: Dai Yige

Lhasa Urban Construction Investment won 2–1 on aggregate.

== Top scorers ==
Rank	Player	Club	Total
1	(China) Ma Xiaolei	Shenzhen Ledman	14
2	(China) Qu Cheng	Sichuan Longfor	13
2	(China) Yang Zi	Shenzhen Ledman	13
4	(China) Wang Ziming	Heilongjiang Lava Spring	12
4	(China) Zhu Shiyu	Qingdao Jonoon	12
6	(China) Gong Zheng	Beijing BIT	9
6	(China) Shi Jun	Hebei Elite	9
6	(China) Tan Tiancheng	Yinchuan Helanshan	9
6	(China) Wang Chaolong	Jiangsu Yancheng Dingli	9
6	(China) Ye Weichao	Meizhou Meixian Techand	9

Last updated: Nov 5, 2017
Source: fa.org.cn

== Awards ==
The awards of 2017 China League Two were announced on 29 November 2017.

- Most valuable player: (China) Li Shuai (Heilongjiang Lava Spring)
- Golden Boot: (China) Ma Xiaolei (Shenzhen Ledman)
- Best goalkeeper: (China) Wang Qi (Qingdao Jonoon)
- Young Player of the Year: (China) Zhong Yihao (Qingdao Jonoon)
- Best coach: (China) Duan Xin (Heilongjiang Lava Spring)
- Fair play award: Yinchuan Helanshan, Dalian Boyoung, Suzhou Dongwu, Shanghai JuJu Sports, Sichuan Longfor, Shaanxi Chang'an Athletic
- Best referee: (China) Jia Zhiliang, (China) Sun Shengyu, (China) Su Xiaofei

== League attendance ==
Updated to Final Round

Pos	Team	Total	High	Low	Average	Change
1	Shaanxi Chang'an Athletic	200,401	28,119	5,269	16,700	n/a^{††}
2	Heilongjiang Lava Spring	186,276	26,880	5,161	13,305	+54.7%
3	Sichuan Longfor	56,329	6,280	3,124	4,694	−21.9%
4	Meizhou Meixian Techand	51,783	6,728	2,560	3,983	−23.7%
5	Shenzhen Ledman	43,767	6,531	523	3,126	+22.4%
6	Nantong Zhiyun	40,705	7,530	2,380	3,392	−29.7%
7	Baotou Nanjiao	39,382	6,189	2,016	3,029	+77.3%
8	Yinchuan Helanshan	29,881	3,762	630	2,299	−28.3%
9	Shenyang Urban	21,126	6,827	121	1,761	−45.6%
10	Jiangxi Liansheng	18,380	4,535	368	1,532	−70.9%
11	Suzhou Dongwu	13,797	1,760	615	1,150	+58.0%
12	Hainan Boying	11,996	1,896	465	1,000	−31.3%
12	Chengdu Qbao	11,110	3,078	210	926	−35.8%
14	Zhenjiang Huasa	10,577	3,183	212	881	n/a^{††}
15	Qingdao Jonoon	10,092	2,089	384	841	−68.9%^{†}
16	Hunan Billows	8,141	1,238	312	678	−82.1%^{†}
17	Jilin Baijia	7,496	1,428	185	625	n/a^{††}
18	Beijing BIT	6,919	1,562	308	577	−22.9%
19	Jiangsu Yancheng Dingli	6,054	827	286	505	−30.9%
20	Dalian Boyoung	5,785	1,080	237	482	n/a^{††}
21	Shanghai JuJu Sports	4,732	1,321	70	394	−6.9%
22	Hebei Elite	4,389	637	216	366	−13.5%
23	Shanghai Sunfun	4,023	582	56	335	n/a^{††}
24	Shenyang Dongjin	3,701	512	108	285	−51.4%
	League total	796,842	28,119	56	2,692	−7.7%

Updated to games played on Feb 28, 2018
Notes:
^{†} Teams played previous season in CL1.
^{††} Teams played previous season in CAL.
