= Guo Mingyue =

Chinese footballer (born 1986)

Guo Mingyue 郭明月
Personal information
- Full name: Guo Mingyue
- Date of birth: March 7, 1986 (age 40)
- Place of birth: Dalian, China
- Height: 1.86 m (6 ft 1 in)
- Positions: Defender; midfielder

Youth career
- 2000–2006: Shandong Luneng

Senior career*
Years	Team	Apps	(Gls)
2007	Wuhan Optics Valley	5	(0)
2008–2011	Jiangsu Sainty	12	(0)
2011–2013	Chongqing F.C.	73	(1)
2014	Yinchuan Helanshan	8	(0)
2015–2018	Shenzhen Renren	61	(3)
2019–2020	Zibo Cuju	32	(3)
- * Club domestic league appearances and goals as of 31 December 2020

Guo Mingyue (Chinese: 郭明月) (born 7 March 1986 in Dalian) is a Chinese football player who plays as a defender or midfielder.

== Club career ==
Guo Mingyue originally began his football career by playing with the various Shandong Luneng youth teams. He was however unable to graduate to the senior team and by the end of the 2006 league season was allowed to leave the club. He would join top-tier side Wuhan Optics Valley in series of deals that brought him to Wuhan with fellow Shandong players Ren Yongshun, Li Zhuangfei and Deng Xiaofei. He would soon go on to make his league debut on April 21, 2007 against Shenzhen Shangqingyin in a 2-1 defeat. As the season went along the club's manager Pei Encai would be dismissed, this would cause some bad relationships between the local players against most of the Shandong players in the team to be exposed, this saw the Shandong players except Deng Xiaofei to be purged out of the club at the end of the season.

Guo would transfer to second-tier club Jiangsu Sainty and be re-united with the manager from Wuhan Pei Encai at the beginning of the 2008 league season while also being awarded the No.6 jersey. He would go on to make his debut on April 20, 2008 against Sichuan FC in a 1-0 defeat. In his first season with Jiangsu Sainty Guo would receive two league appearances, however it was enough for him to aid the club to win the division title at the end of the season. Back within the top tier Guo would be a squad player as Jiangsu Sainty became mid-table regulars, however after being unable gain more playing time he was allowed to transfer to third-tier club Chongqing F.C. on July in the 2011 Chinese league season. At Chongqing, Guo would play in seventeen games as the club reached the division play-off final where he would personally miss a penalty that saw Harbin Songbei Yiteng win the title, however despite this his club would still gain promotion to the second tier.

In 2015, Guo signed for Shenzhen Renren. On 19 February 2019, Guo transferred to League Two side Zibo Cuju.

== National team ==
As a youngster Guo Mingyue would be called to the Chinese U-17 National Team and would be included in the squad that competed in 2003 FIFA U-17 World Championship. During the tournament he would receive no playing time while he saw China knocked out during the group stage.

== Career statistics ==
Statistics accurate as of match played 31 December 2020.

Appearances and goals by club, season and competition
Club	Season	League			National Cup		Continental		Other		Total	
Club	Season	Division	Apps	Goals	Apps	Goals	Apps	Goals	Apps	Goals	Apps	Goals
Wuhan Optics Valley	2007	Chinese Super League	5	0	-		-		-		5	0
Jiangsu Sainty	2008	China League One	2	0	-		-		-		7	0
Jiangsu Sainty	2009	Chinese Super League	7	0	-		-		-		12	4
Jiangsu Sainty	2010	Chinese Super League	3	0	-		-		-		23	4
Jiangsu Sainty	2011	Chinese Super League	0	0	0	0	-		-		0	0
Jiangsu Sainty	Total		12	0	0	0	0	0	0	0	12	0
Chongqing F.C.	2011	China League Two	17	0	0	0	-		-		17	0
Chongqing F.C.	2012	China League One	28	1	1	1	-		-		29	2
Chongqing F.C.	2013	China League One	28	0	1	0	-		-		29	0
Chongqing F.C.	Total		73	1	2	1	0	0	0	0	75	2
Yinchuan Helanshan	2014	China League Two	8	0	0	0	-		-		8	0
Shenzhen Renren	2015	China Amateur Football League	-		-		-		-		-	
Shenzhen Renren	2016	China League Two	12	0	1	0	-		-		13	0
Shenzhen Renren	2017	China League Two	26	2	1	0	-		-		27	2
Shenzhen Renren	2018	China League Two	23	1	1	0	-		-		24	1
Shenzhen Renren	Total		61	3	3	0	0	0	0	0	64	3
Zibo Cuju	2019	China League Two	28	2	4	0	-		-		32	2
Zibo Cuju	2020	China League Two	4	1	-		-		-		4	1
Zibo Cuju	Total		32	3	4	0	0	0	0	0	36	3
Career total			186	7	9	1	0	0	0	0	195	8

== Honours ==
=== Club ===
Jiangsu Sainty

- China League One: 2008
