= Mai Sijing =

Chinese association football player

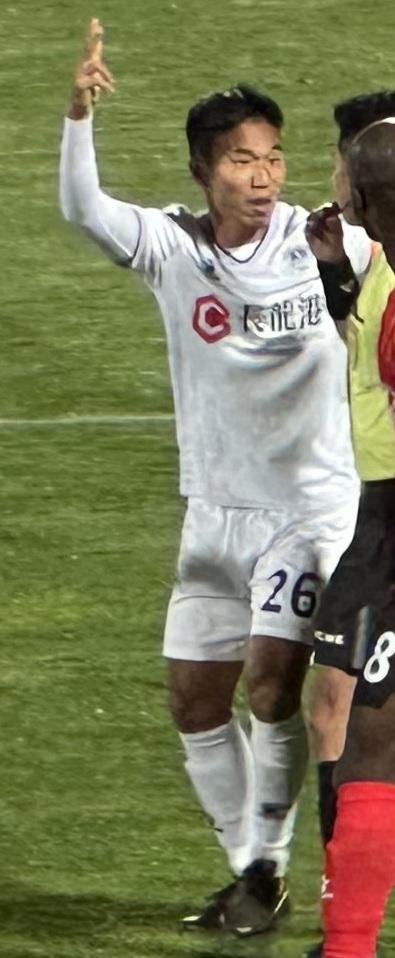
- Mai Sijing in April 2025

Personal information
- Date of birth: 17 April 1991 (age 35)
- Place of birth: Shenzhen, Guangdong, China
- Height: 1.75 m (5 ft 9 in)
- Position: Forward

Senior career*
Years	Team	Apps	(Gls)
2008–2009	Xiangxue Eisiti	9	(0)
- Jiangxi Liansheng
- Nanjing Qianbao
2016–2018	Shenzhen Renren	46	(7)
2019–2020	Shaanxi Chang'an Athletic	13	(0)
2021–2022	Zibo Cuju	41	(1)
2023–2025	Shenzhen Juniors	33	(1)
- * Club domestic league appearances and goals as of 14:01, 28 July 2021 (UTC)

Mai Sijing (Chinese: 麦思劲; born 17 April 1991) is a Chinese former footballer who played as a forward.

== Career statistics ==
=== Club ===
As of 28 July 2021.

Club	Season	League			Cup		Continental		Other		Total	
Club	Season	Division	Apps	Goals	Apps	Goals	Apps	Goals	Apps	Goals	Apps	Goals
Xiangxue Eisiti	2008–09	First Division	9	0	0	0	–		0	0	9	0
Nanjing Qianbao	2015	China League Two	2	0	1 (Note: Appearances in the Chinese FA Cup)	0	–		0	0	3	0
Shenzhen Renren	2016	China League Two	9	2	0	0	–		2 (Note: Appearances in the China League Two playoffs)	0	11	2
Shenzhen Renren	2017	China League Two	18	3	0	0	–		5	1	23	4
Shenzhen Renren	2018	China League Two	19	2	1	0	–		2	1	22	3
Shenzhen Renren	Total		46	7	1	0	0	0	9	2	56	9
Shaanxi Chang'an Athletic	2019	China League One	9	0	1	0	–		0	0	10	0
Shaanxi Chang'an Athletic	2020	China League One	4	0	0	0	–		0	0	4	0
Shaanxi Chang'an Athletic	Total		13	0	1	0	0	0	0	0	14	0
Zibo Cuju	2020	China League One	7	0	0	0	–		0	0	7	0
Career total			31	6	4	0	0	0	2	0	37	6
