= Liu Le =

Chinese footballer (born 1989)

Liu Le 刘乐
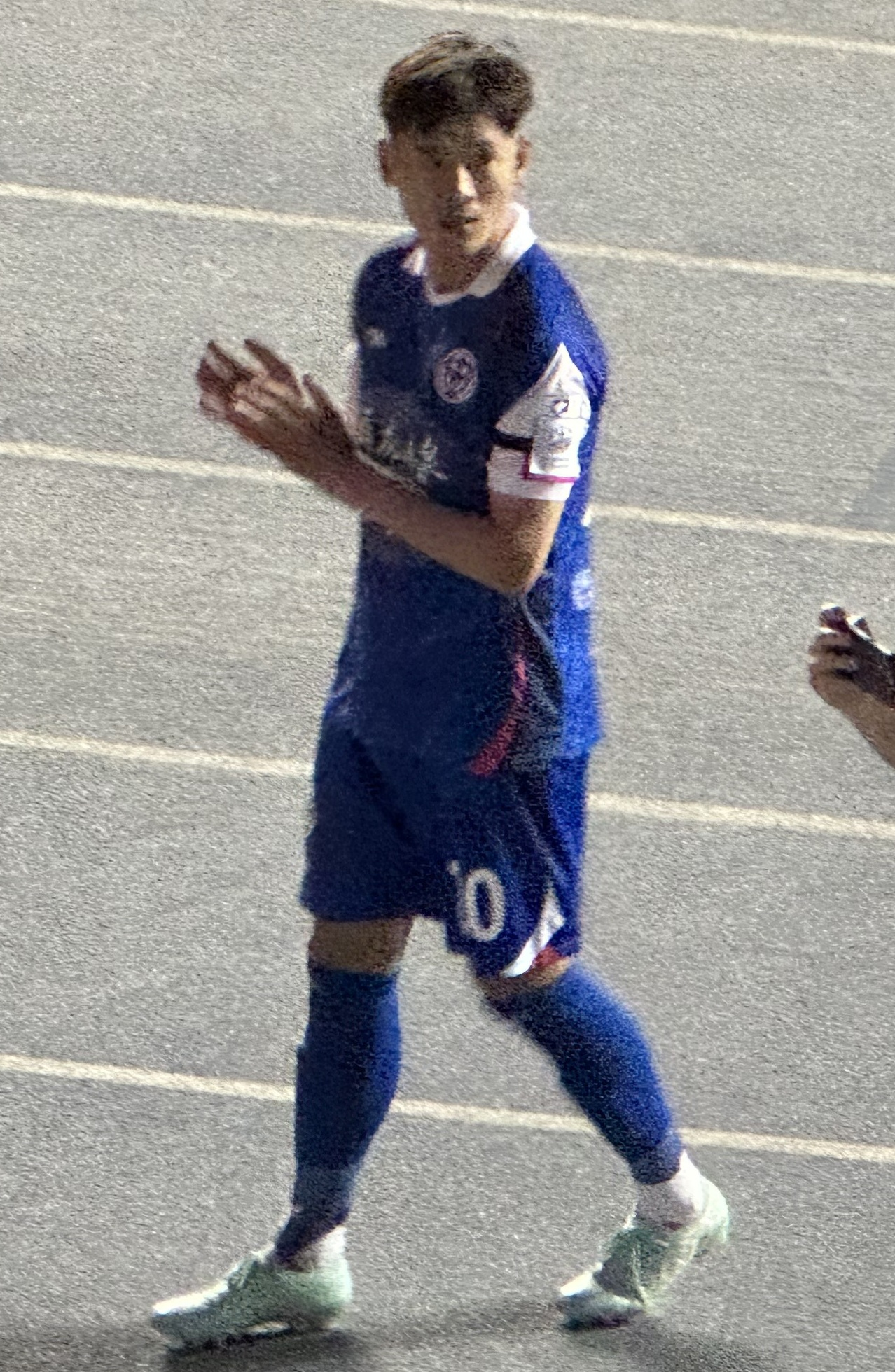
- Liu Le in May 2025

Personal information
- Full name: Liu Le
- Date of birth: 14 February 1989 (age 37)
- Place of birth: Beijing, China
- Height: 1.83 m (6 ft 0 in)
- Position: Left-back

Team information
- Current team: Nanjing City
- Number: 20

Senior career*
Years	Team	Apps	(Gls)
2009–2010	Anhui Jiufang	17	(0)
2011–2014	Shenyang Zhongze	80	(4)
2015–2016	Shenyang City	20	(3)
2017	Shenzhen Ledman	24	(2)
2018–2021	Chongqing Dangdai	62	(0)
2022	Dalian Huayi	0	(0)
2022–2023	Dalian Pro	6	(0)
2024–2025	Shijiazhuang Gongfu	55	(2)
2026–	Nanjing City	0	(0)
- * Club domestic league appearances and goals as of 9 March 2026

Liu Le (Chinese: 刘乐; pinyin: Liú Lè; born 14 February 1989) is a Chinese professional footballer who plays as a defender for China League One club Nanjing City.

== Club career ==
Liu Le started his professional football career in 2009 when he was promoted to China League One side Anhui Jiufang. He moved to Tianjin Runyulong in January 2011 when Tianjin took over Anhui Jiufang and followed the club move to Shenyang as Shenyang Shenbei in July 2011. On 30 April 2011, he scored his first senior goal in a 1–1 away draw against Wuhan Zhongbo. Liu kept his regular starter position with his twin brother Liu Huan after the club moved to Shenyang and changed their name as Shenyang Zhongze. Liu joined amateur club Shenyang City in 2015 after Shenyang Zhongze's dissolution. He transferred to China League Two club Shenzhen Ledman in March 2017.

On 2 January 2018, Liu transferred to Chinese Super League side Chongqing Dangdai following the departure of his brother Liu Huan joining Beijing Sinobo Guoan from Chongqing. He would go on to make his debut in a league game for the club on 3 March 2018 against Beijing Renhe in a 1-0 victory. Liu established himself as regular within the team until the club was dissolved on 24 May 2022 due to financial difficulties. He would briefly join fourth tier club Dalian Huayi before returning to the top tier with Dalian Professional, where he made his debut for the club in a league game on 20 September 2022 against Hebei F.C. that ended in a 2-1 victory.

== Personal life ==
Liu Le is the younger twin brother of Nantong Zhiyun defender Liu Huan. They are from Beijing.

== Career statistics ==
As of 31 December 2022.

Appearances and goals by club, season and competition
Club	Season	League			National Cup		Continental		Other		Total	
Club	Season	Division	Apps	Goals	Apps	Goals	Apps	Goals	Apps	Goals	Apps	Goals
Anhui Jiufang	2009	China League One	12	0	-		-		-		12	0
Anhui Jiufang	2010	China League One	5	0	-		-		-		5	0
Anhui Jiufang	Total		17	0	0	0	0	0	0	0	17	0
Shenyang Zhongze	2011	China League One	24	2	2	0	-		-		26	2
Shenyang Zhongze	2012	China League One	15	1	2	1	-		-		17	2
Shenyang Zhongze	2013	China League One	21	1	0	0	-		-		21	1
Shenyang Zhongze	2014	China League One	20	0	2	1	-		-		22	1
Shenyang Zhongze	Total		80	4	6	2	0	0	0	0	86	6
Shenyang City	2016	China League Two	20	3	1	0	-		-		21	3
Shenzhen Ledman	2017	China League Two	24	2	2	0	-		-		26	2
Chongqing Dangdai	2018	Chinese Super League	18	0	0	0	-		-		18	0
Chongqing Dangdai	2019	Chinese Super League	12	0	2	0	-		-		14	0
Chongqing Dangdai	2020	Chinese Super League	16	0	1	0	-		-		17	0
Chongqing Dangdai	2021	Chinese Super League	16	0	2	0	-		-		18	0
Chongqing Dangdai	Total		62	0	5	0	0	0	0	0	67	0
Dalian Huayi	2022	Chinese Champions League	0	0	-		-		-		0	0
Dalian Professional	2022	Chinese Super League	5	0	1	0	-		-		6	0
Career total			188	9	15	2	0	0	0	0	203	11
