= 2016 China Amateur Football League =

China Amateur Football League
- Season: 2016
- Champions: Dalian Boyang
- Promoted: Dalian Boyang; Shaanxi Chang'an Athletic; Shanghai Sunfun; Jilin Baijia; Zhenjiang Huasa

The 2016 China Amateur Football League season was the 15th season since its establishment in 2002. It is the highest amateur association football league in PR China with some semi-professional clubs. 44 clubs were qualified for the second round.

== Promotion and relegation ==
Teams promoted to 2016 China League Two

- Suzhou Dongwu
- Hainan Seamen
- Shenzhen Renren
- Shenyang Urban

== Format ==
The qualification structure is as follows:

- First round: Chinese Football Association subordinate Provincial, City League, champion will advance to the second round.
- Second round: It is divided into four groups, Northeast, Northwest, Southeast and Southwest. The top four teams of each group will advance to Third round.
- Third round: It is divided into four groups, Group A, Group B, Group C and Group D. The four winners may be qualify for the 2017 China League Two.

== First round ==
China Amateur Football League includes 44 regional leagues. Number of teams: 1000+

=== Teams qualified for the second round ===
| Groups | Team | City | Qualifying method | Position | Ref |
|---|---|---|---|---|---|
| Northeast | Dalian Boyang | Dalian | Qualified position of Dalian Longjuanfeng | | |
| Northeast | Dalian Teha | Dalian | 2015-16 Dalian City Super League | Winners | |
| Northeast | Hebei Lion | Cangzhou | 2016 Hebei Provincial Amateur League | Winners | |
| Northeast | Heilongjiang Tianfeng | Daqing | 2016 Daqing City Football League | Winners | |
| Northeast | Jilin Baijia | Changchun | 2016 Changchun City Amateur League (Super Group) | Winners | |
| Northeast | Shenyang West Winner | Shenyang | 2016 Shenyang City Super League | Winners | |
| Northeast | Tianjin Kunshengsong | Tianjin | 2016 Tianjin City Amateur League | Winners | |
| Northeast | Zhangjiakou Zhuoyue | Zhangjiakou | 2016 Hebei Provincial Amateur League | Runners-up | |
| Northeast | Zibo Qi Eagle | Zibo | 2016 Shandong Provincial Super League | Runners-up | |
| Northeast | Zibo Sunday | Zibo | 2016 Shandong Provincial Super League | Winners | |
| Northwest | Lanzhou Xiangchen | Lanzhou | | | |
| Northwest | Henan Orient Classic | Zhengzhou | 2016 Zhengzhou City Amateur League | 3rd place | |
| Northwest | Hubei Huachuang | Wuhan | 2016 Chinago Champions League (South Group) | Winners | |
| Northwest | Manzhouli Biancheng Xuelang | Manzhouli | 2016 CAL Inner Mongolia Qualifying play-off | Winners | |
| Northwest | Inner Mongolia Shengle Mongolian Sheep | Horinger | 2016 CAL Inner Mongolia Qualifying play-off | Runners-up | |
| Northwest | Shaanxi Chang'an Athletic | Xi'an | 2016 Shaanxi Provincial Super League | Winners | |
| Northwest | Shanxi Dragon City | Taiyuan | 2016 Shanxi Provincial Football League (A Group) | Winners | |
| Northwest | Wuhan Chufeng Heli | Wuhan | 2016 Wuhan City Super League | Winners | |
| Northwest | Wuhan Dongfeng Honda | Wuhan | 2016 Wuhan City Super League | Runners-up | |
| Northwest | Xi'an Yilian | Xi'an | | | |
| Southeast | Anhui Sanchuan | Hefei | 2016 Anhui Provincial Football League | Winners | |
| Southeast | Hangzhou Ange | Hangzhou | 2016 Zhejiang FA Cup | Winners | |
| Southeast | Nanjing Shaye | Nanjing | 2016 Nanjing City Super League | Winners | |
| Southeast | Ningbo Yinbo | Ningbo | 2015 Zhejiang Provincial Champions' League | Winners | |
| Southeast | Qingdao Red Lions | Qingdao | 2016 Qingdao City Super League | 3rd place | |
| Southeast | Qingdao QUST | Qingdao | 2016 Qingdao City Super League | 4th place | |
| Southeast | Shanghai Yangpu Chuanglin | Shanghai | 2016 Shanghai City "Chen Yi Cup" Football Championship | Runners-up | |
| Southeast | Shanghai Sunfun | Shanghai | 2016 Shanghai City "Chen Yi Cup" Football Championship | Winners | |
| Southeast | Shenzhen Baoxin | Shenzhen | 2016 Shenzhen City Football League | Winners | |
| Southeast | Shenzhen Yisheng | Shenzhen | 2016 Shenzhen City Football League | Runners-up | |
| Southeast | Wuxi Yinyang | Wuxi | 2016 Jiangsu Provincial Football League | Runners-up | |
| Southeast | Zhenjiang Huasa | Zhenjiang | 2016 Jiangsu Provincial Football League | Winners | |
| Southwest | Anhui Hefei Guiguan | Hefei | 2016 Anhui Provincial Football League | Runners-up | |
| Southwest | Changsha Sihai | Changsha | 2016 Hunan Provincial Super League | Winners | |
| Southwest | Chengdu Yifeng | Chengdu | 2016 Chengdu City Super League | 5th | |
| Southwest | Chongqing Dikai | Chongqing | 2016 Chongqing City League One | Winners | |
| Southwest | Guangxi Wodema | Nanning | 2016 Guangxi Provincial Football League | Runners-up | |
| Southwest | Lhasa Pure Land | Lhasa | 2016 Lhasa City League One | Runners-up | |
| Southwest | Liuzhou Ranko | Liuzhou | 2016 Guangxi Provincial Football League | Winners | |
| Southwest | Sichuan Jinguancheng | Chengdu | 2016 Chengdu City Super League | Runners-up | |
| Southwest | Sichuan Youth | Chengdu | 2016 Sichuan Provincial Football League | Winners | |
| Southwest | Yunnan Xinyuexin | Kunming | 2016 Chinago Champions League (South Group) | 3rd place | |
| Southwest | Zhaoqing Hengtai | Zhaoqing | 2015 Guangdong Provincial Football League | Winners | |
| Southwest | Zhuhai Suoka | Zhuhai | | | |

Source: fa.org.cn

== Second round ==
=== Northeast Group ===
==== Group A ====
| Team | Pld | W | D | L | GF | GA | GD | Pts |
|---|---|---|---|---|---|---|---|---|
| Dalian Boyang (Q, C, P) | 4 | 3 | 1 | 0 | 9 | 3 | +6 | 10 |
| Tianjin Kunshengsong (Q) | 4 | 2 | 1 | 1 | 6 | 6 | 0 | 7 |
| Hebei Lion | 4 | 1 | 3 | 0 | 6 | 2 | +4 | 6 |
| Heilongjiang Tianfeng | 4 | 1 | 1 | 2 | 1 | 2 | -1 | 4 |
| Zibo Qi Eagle | 4 | 0 | 0 | 4 | 0 | 9 | -9 | 0 |

| 1 October | Tianjin Kunshengsong | 2–0 | Zibo Qi Eagle | Yatai Training Base, Changchun |
| 08:45 |

| 1 October | Dalian Boyang | 1–1 | Hebei Lion | Yatai Training Base, Changchun |
| 10:45 |

| 2 October | Hebei Lion | 0–0 | Heilongjiang Tianfeng | Yatai Training Base, Changchun |
| 08:45 |

| 2 October | Dalian Boyang | 2–0 | Zibo Qi Eagle | Yatai Training Base, Changchun |
| 10:45 |

| 4 October | Heilongjiang Tianfeng | 0–1 | Tianjin Kunshengsong | Yatai Training Base, Changchun |
| 12:45 |

| 4 October | Zibo Qi Eagle | 0–4 | Hebei Lion | Yatai Training Base, Changchun |
| 14:45 |

| 5 October | Tianjin Kunshengsong | 2–5 | Dalian Boyang | Yatai Training Base, Changchun |
| 12:45 |

| 5 October | Zibo Qi Eagle | 0–1 | Heilongjiang Tianfeng | Yatai Training Base, Changchun |
| 14:45 |

| 7 October | Heilongjiang Tianfeng | 0–1 | Dalian Boyang | Yatai Training Base, Changchun |
| 10:00 |

| 7 October | Tianjin Kunshengsong | 1–1 | Hebei Lion | Yatai Training Base, Changchun |
| 10:00 |

==== Group B ====
| Team | Pld | W | D | L | GF | GA | GD | Pts |
|---|---|---|---|---|---|---|---|---|
| Jilin Baijia (Q, P) | 4 | 4 | 0 | 0 | 23 | 4 | +19 | 12 |
| Zibo Sunday (Q) | 4 | 3 | 0 | 1 | 11 | 1 | +10 | 9 |
| Shenyang West Winner | 4 | 2 | 0 | 2 | 12 | 6 | +6 | 6 |
| Dalian Teha | 4 | 1 | 0 | 3 | 8 | 14 | -6 | 3 |
| Zhangjiakou Zhuoyue | 4 | 0 | 0 | 4 | 3 | 32 | -29 | 0 |

| 1 October | Zhangjiakou Zhuoyue | 0–7 | Zibo Sunday | Yatai Training Base, Changchun |
| 12:45 |

| 1 October | Jilin Baijia | 2–0 | Shenyang West Winner | Yatai Training Base, Changchun |
| 14:45 |

| 2 October | Shenyang West Winner | 4–1 | Dalian Teha | Yatai Training Base, Changchun |
| 12:45 |

| 2 October | Jilin Baijia | 1–0 | Zibo Sunday | Yatai Training Base, Changchun |
| 14:45 |

| 4 October | Dalian Teha | 5–0 | Zhangjiakou Zhuoyue | Yatai Training Base, Changchun |
| 08:45 |

| 4 October | Zibo Sunday | 2–0 | Shenyang West Winner | Yatai Training Base, Changchun |
| 10:45 |

| 5 October | Zhangjiakou Zhuoyue | 2–12 | Jilin Baijia | Yatai Training Base, Changchun |
| 08:45 |

| 5 October | Zibo Sunday | 2–0 | Dalian Teha | Yatai Training Base, Changchun |
| 10:45 |

| 7 October | Dalian Teha | 2–8 | Jilin Baijia | Yatai Training Base, Changchun |

| 7 October | Zhangjiakou Zhuoyue | 1–8 | Shenyang West Winner | Yatai Training Base, Changchun |

=== Northwest Group ===
==== Group A ====
| Team | Pld | W | D | L | GF | GA | GD | Pts |
|---|---|---|---|---|---|---|---|---|
| Shaanxi Chang'an Athletic (Q, P) | 4 | 4 | 0 | 0 | 16 | 0 | +16 | 12 |
| Shanxi Dragon City (Q) | 4 | 3 | 0 | 1 | 11 | 4 | +7 | 9 |
| Manzhouli Biancheng Xuelang | 4 | 2 | 0 | 2 | 4 | 7 | -3 | 6 |
| Wuhan Dongfeng Honda | 4 | 1 | 0 | 3 | 8 | 8 | 0 | 3 |
| Lanzhou Xiangchen | 4 | 0 | 0 | 4 | 1 | 21 | -20 | 0 |

| 1 October | Shanxi Dragon City | 0–2 | Shaanxi Chang'an Athletic | Horinger Shengle Training Base, Hohhot |
| 13:00 |

| 1 October | Wuhan Dongfeng Honda | 0–1 | Manzhouli Biancheng Xuelang | Horinger Shengle Training Base, Hohhot |
| 13:00 |

| 2 October | Manzhouli Biancheng Xuelang | 3–0 | Lanzhou Xiangchen | Horinger Shengle Training Base, Hohhot |
| 13:00 |

| 2 October | Wuhan Dongfeng Honda | 0–3 | Shaanxi Chang'an Athletic | Horinger Shengle Training Base, Hohhot |
| 13:00 |

| 4 October | Lanzhou Xiangchen | 0–6 | Shanxi Dragon City | Horinger Shengle Training Base, Hohhot |
| 13:00 |

| 4 October | Shaanxi Chang'an Athletic | 5–0 | Manzhouli Biancheng Xuelang | Horinger Shengle Training Base, Hohhot |
| 13:00 |

| 5 October | Shanxi Dragon City | 3–2 | Wuhan Dongfeng Honda | Horinger Shengle Training Base, Hohhot |
| 13:00 |

| 5 October | Shaanxi Chang'an Athletic | 6–0 | Lanzhou Xiangchen | Horinger Shengle Training Base, Hohhot |
| 13:00 |

| 7 October | Lanzhou Xiangchen | 1–6 | Wuhan Dongfeng Honda | Horinger Shengle Training Base, Hohhot |
| 10:00 |

| 7 October | Shanxi Dragon City | 2–0 | Manzhouli Biancheng Xuelang | Horinger Shengle Training Base, Hohhot |
| 10:00 |

==== Group B ====
| Team | Pld | W | D | L | GF | GA | GD | Pts |
|---|---|---|---|---|---|---|---|---|
| Wuhan Chufeng Heli (Q) | 3 | 3 | 0 | 0 | 14 | 2 | +12 | 9 |
| Henan Orient Classic (Q) | 3 | 2 | 0 | 1 | 3 | 3 | 0 | 6 |
| Xi'an Yilian | 3 | 1 | 0 | 2 | 5 | 7 | -2 | 3 |
| Inner Mongolia Shengle Mongolian Sheep | 3 | 0 | 0 | 3 | 3 | 13 | -10 | 0 |
| Hubei Huachuang | – | – | – | – | – | – | – | – |

| 1 October | Henan Orient Classic | 1–0 | Xi'an Yilian | Horinger Shengle Training Base, Hohhot |
| 15:00 |

| 1 October | Inner Mongolia Shengle Mongolian Sheep | 1–7 | Wuhan Chufeng Heli | Horinger Shengle Training Base, Hohhot |
| 15:00 |

| 3 October | Inner Mongolia Shengle Mongolian Sheep | 0–1 | Henan Orient Classic | Horinger Shengle Training Base, Hohhot |
| 15:00 |

| 3 October | Wuhan Chufeng Heli | 4–0 | Xi'an Yilian | Horinger Shengle Training Base, Hohhot |
| 15:00 |

| 5 October | Xi'an Yilian | 5–2 | Inner Mongolia Shengle Mongolian Sheep | Horinger Shengle Training Base, Hohhot |
| 15:00 |

| 5 October | Henan Orient Classic | 1–3 | Wuhan Chufeng Heli | Horinger Shengle Training Base, Hohhot |
| 15:00 |

=== Southeast Group ===
==== Group A ====
| Team | Pld | W | D | L | GF | GA | GD | Pts |
|---|---|---|---|---|---|---|---|---|
| Shanghai Sunfun (Q, P) | 3 | 2 | 1 | 0 | 10 | 1 | +9 | 7 |
| Hangzhou Ange (Q) | 3 | 2 | 0 | 1 | 2 | 7 | -5 | 6 |
| Nanjing Shaye (Q) | 3 | 1 | 1 | 1 | 1 | 1 | 0 | 4 |
| Qingdao QUST | 3 | 0 | 0 | 3 | 1 | 5 | -4 | 0 |

| 1 October | Shanghai Sunfun | 7–0 | Hangzhou Ange | Shanghai University of International Business and Economics, Shanghai |
| 15:00 | Shang Yin 39', 48', 57'; Zhao Hongxu 45'; Pan Jiyuan 63', 79'; 86' (pen.) |

| 1 October | Qingdao QUST | 0–1 | Nanjing Shaye | Donghua University, Shanghai |
| 15:00 |

| 3 October | Nanjing Shaye | 0–0 | Shanghai Sunfun | Shanghai University of International Business and Economics, Shanghai |
| 10:00 | | | | Referee: Li Zheng |

| 3 October | Hangzhou Ange | 1–0 | Qingdao QUST | Donghua University, Shanghai |
| 10:00 |

| 5 October | Shanghai Sunfun | 3–1 | Qingdao QUST | Shanghai University of International Business and Economics, Shanghai |
| 13:00 | Xie Fuquan 1'; Xu Dan 7'; Xiong Tao 20' | | Goal | Referee: Li Pengda |

| 5 October | Hangzhou Ange | 1–0 | Nanjing Shaye | Donghua University, Shanghai |
| 13:00 |

==== Group B ====
| Team | Pld | W | D | L | GF | GA | GD | Pts |
|---|---|---|---|---|---|---|---|---|
| Wuxi Yinyang (Q) | 3 | 2 | 1 | 0 | 7 | 1 | +6 | 7 |
| Shenzhen Baoxin (Q) | 3 | 1 | 2 | 0 | 3 | 1 | +2 | 5 |
| Anhui Sanchuan | 3 | 1 | 1 | 1 | 2 | 3 | -1 | 4 |
| Qingdao Red Lions | 3 | 0 | 0 | 3 | 1 | 8 | -7 | 0 |

| 1 October | Anhui Sanchuan | 0–2 | Wuxi Yinyang | Shanghai University of International Business and Economics, Shanghai |
| 13:00 |

| 1 October | Qingdao Red Lions | 0–2 | Shenzhen Baoxin | Donghua University, Shanghai |
| 13:00 |

| 3 October | Wuxi Yinyang | 4–0 | Qingdao Red Lions | Shanghai University of International Business and Economics, Shanghai |
| 15:00 |

| 3 October | Shenzhen Baoxin | 0–0 | Anhui Sanchuan | Donghua University, Shanghai |
| 15:00 |

| 5 October | Shenzhen Baoxin | 1–1 | Wuxi Yinyang | Shanghai University of International Business and Economics, Shanghai |
| 10:00 |

| 5 October | Qingdao Red Lions | 1–2 | Anhui Sanchuan | Donghua University, Shanghai |
| 10:00 |

==== Group C ====
| Team | Pld | W | D | L | GF | GA | GD | Pts |
|---|---|---|---|---|---|---|---|---|
| Zhenjiang Huasa (Q, P) | 3 | 2 | 0 | 1 | 6 | 2 | +4 | 6 |
| Shenzhen Yisheng (Q) | 3 | 1 | 2 | 0 | 3 | 2 | +1 | 5 |
| Ningbo Yinbo (Q) | 3 | 1 | 1 | 1 | 6 | 4 | +2 | 4 |
| Shanghai Yangpu Chuanglin | 3 | 0 | 1 | 2 | 1 | 8 | -7 | 1 |

| 1 October | Shanghai Yangpu Chuanglin | 0–3; Awarded | Zhenjiang Huasa | Shanghai University of International Business and Economics, Shanghai |
| 10:00 |

| 1 October | Ningbo Yinbo | 1–1 | Shenzhen Yisheng | Donghua University, Shanghai |
| 10:00 |

| 3 October | Zhenjiang Huasa | 2–0 | Ningbo Yinbo | Shanghai University of International Business and Economics, Shanghai |
| 13:00 |

| 3 October | Shanghai Yangpu Chuanglin | 0–0 | Shenzhen Yisheng | Donghua University, Shanghai |
| 13:00 |

| 5 October | Ningbo Yinbo | 5–1 | Shanghai Yangpu Chuanglin | Shanghai University of International Business and Economics, Shanghai |
| 15:00 |

| 5 October | Shenzhen Yisheng | 2–1 | Zhenjiang Huasa | Donghua University, Shanghai |
| 15:00 |

==== Play-offs ====
| 7 October | Shanghai Sunfun | 1–0 | Ningbo Yinbo | Shanghai University of International Business and Economics, Shanghai |
| 10:00 | Zheng Fengwei 17' |

| 7 October | Wuxi Yinyang | 4–2 | Nanjing Shaye | Donghua University, Shanghai |
| 10:00 |

| 7 October | Zhenjiang Huasa | 1–0 | Hangzhou Ange | Shanghai University of International Business and Economics, Shanghai |
| 13:00 |

| 7 October | Shenzhen Baoxin | 1–4 | Shenzhen Yisheng | Donghua University, Shanghai |
| 13:00 |

=== Southwest Group ===
==== Group A ====
| Team | Pld | W | D | L | GF | GA | GD | Pts | |
|---|---|---|---|---|---|---|---|---|---|
| Zhuhai Suoka (Q) | 3 | 2 | 0 | 1 | 6 | 2 | +4 | 6 | Zhuhai 3:1 Changsha; Sichuan 1:0 Zhuhai; Changsha 1:0 Sichuan |
| Sichuan Jinguancheng (Q) | 3 | 2 | 0 | 1 | 8 | 1 | +7 | 6 | Zhuhai 3:1 Changsha; Sichuan 1:0 Zhuhai; Changsha 1:0 Sichuan |
| Changsha Sihai (Q) | 3 | 2 | 0 | 1 | 4 | 4 | 0 | 6 | Zhuhai 3:1 Changsha; Sichuan 1:0 Zhuhai; Changsha 1:0 Sichuan |
| Chongqing Dikai | 3 | 0 | 0 | 3 | 1 | 12 | -11 | 0 | |

| 1 October | Chongqing Dikai | 0–7 | Sichuan Jinguancheng | Beijing Institute of Technology (Zhuhai Campus), Zhuhai |
| 10:00 |

| 1 October | Changsha Sihai | 1–3 | Zhuhai Suoka | Beijing Normal University (Zhuhai Campus), Zhuhai |
| 10:00 |

| 3 October | Sichuan Jinguancheng | 0–1 | Changsha Sihai | Beijing Institute of Technology (Zhuhai Campus), Zhuhai |
| 10:00 |

| 3 October | Zhuhai Suoka | 3–0 | Chongqing Dikai | Beijing Normal University (Zhuhai Campus), Zhuhai |
| 10:00 |

| 5 October | Zhuhai Suoka | 0–1 | Sichuan Jinguancheng | Beijing Institute of Technology (Zhuhai Campus), Zhuhai |
| 10:00 |

| 5 October | Changsha Sihai | 2–1 | Chongqing Dikai | Beijing Normal University (Zhuhai Campus), Zhuhai |
| 10:00 |

==== Group B ====
| Team | Pld | W | D | L | GF | GA | GD | Pts |
|---|---|---|---|---|---|---|---|---|
| Anhui Hefei Guiguan (Q) | 3 | 2 | 1 | 0 | 18 | 2 | +16 | 7 |
| Zhaoqing Hengtai (Q) | 3 | 2 | 1 | 0 | 10 | 2 | +8 | 7 |
| Guangxi Wodema | 3 | 0 | 1 | 2 | 2 | 10 | -8 | 1 |
| Chengdu Yifeng | 3 | 0 | 1 | 2 | 2 | 18 | -16 | 1 |

| 1 October | Guangxi Wodema | 1–1 | Chengdu Yifeng | Beijing Institute of Technology (Zhuhai Campus), Zhuhai |
| 13:00 |

| 1 October | Zhaoqing Hengtai | 1–1 | Anhui Hefei Guiguan | Beijing Normal University (Zhuhai Campus), Zhuhai |
| 13:00 |

| 3 October | Chengdu Yifeng | 0–6 | Zhaoqing Hengtai | Beijing Institute of Technology (Zhuhai Campus), Zhuhai |
| 13:00 |

| 3 October | Anhui Hefei Guiguan | 6–0 | Guangxi Wodema | Beijing Normal University (Zhuhai Campus), Zhuhai |
| 13:00 |

| 5 October | Anhui Hefei Guiguan | 11–1 | Chengdu Yifeng | Beijing Institute of Technology (Zhuhai Campus), Zhuhai |
| 13:00 |

| 5 October | Zhaoqing Hengtai | 3–1 | Guangxi Wodema | Beijing Normal University (Zhuhai Campus), Zhuhai |
| 13:00 |

==== Group C ====
| Team | Pld | W | D | L | GF | GA | GD | Pts |
|---|---|---|---|---|---|---|---|---|
| Sichuan Youth (Q) | 3 | 3 | 0 | 0 | 9 | 1 | +8 | 9 |
| Liuzhou Ranko (Q) | 3 | 2 | 0 | 1 | 6 | 5 | +1 | 6 |
| Yunnan Xinyuexin (Q) | 3 | 1 | 0 | 2 | 6 | 11 | -5 | 3 |
| Lhasa Pure Land | 3 | 0 | 0 | 3 | 2 | 6 | -4 | 0 |

| 1 October | Lhasa Pure Land | 0–1 | Liuzhou Ranko | Beijing Institute of Technology (Zhuhai Campus), Zhuhai |
| 15:00 |

| 1 October | Yunnan Xinyuexin | 0–5 | Sichuan Youth | Beijing Normal University (Zhuhai Campus), Zhuhai |
| 15:00 |

| 3 October | Liuzhou Ranko | 4–3 | Yunnan Xinyuexin | Beijing Institute of Technology (Zhuhai Campus), Zhuhai |
| 15:00 |

| 3 October | Sichuan Youth | 2–0 | Lhasa Pure Land | Beijing Normal University (Zhuhai Campus), Zhuhai |
| 15:00 |

| 5 October | Sichuan Youth | 2–1 | Liuzhou Ranko | Beijing Institute of Technology (Zhuhai Campus), Zhuhai |
| 15:00 |

| 5 October | Yunnan Xinyuexin | 3–2 | Lhasa Pure Land | Beijing Normal University (Zhuhai Campus), Zhuhai |
| 15:00 |

==== Play-offs ====
| 7 October | Zhuhai Suoka | 2–1 | Yunnan Xinyuexin | Beijing Institute of Technology (Zhuhai Campus), Zhuhai |
| 13:00 |

| 7 October | Anhui Hefei Guiguan | 2–0 | Changsha Sihai | Beijing Normal University (Zhuhai Campus), Zhuhai |
| 13:00 |

| 7 October | Sichuan Youth | 1–0 | Sichuan Jinguancheng | Beijing Institute of Technology (Zhuhai Campus), Zhuhai |
| 15:00 |

| 7 October | Zhaoqing Hengtai | 4–0 | Liuzhou Ranko | Beijing Normal University (Zhuhai Campus), Zhuhai |
| 15:00 |

=== Teams qualified for the third round ===
| | Team | Groups | Position |
|---|---|---|---|
| Northeast | Dalian Boyang | Northeast, Group A | 1st |
| Northeast | Tianjin Kunshengsong | Northeast, Group A | 2nd |
| Northeast | Jilin Baijia | Northeast, Group B | 1st |
| Northeast | Zibo Sunday | Northeast, Group B | 2nd |
| Northwest | Shaanxi Chang'an Athletic | Northwest, Group A | 1st |
| Northwest | Shanxi Dragon City | Northwest, Group A | 2nd |
| Northwest | Wuhan Chufeng Heli | Northwest, Group B | 1st |
| Northwest | Henan Orient Classic | Northwest, Group B | 2nd |
| Southeast | Shanghai Sunfun | Southeast, Group A | 1st |
| Southeast | Wuxi Yinyang | Southeast, Group B | 1st |
| Southeast | Zhenjiang Huasa | Southeast, Group C | 1st |
| Southeast | Shenzhen Yisheng | Southeast, Group C | 2nd |
| Southwest | Zhuhai Suoka | Southwest, Group A | 1st |
| Southwest | Anhui Hefei Guiguan | Southwest, Group B | 1st |
| Southwest | Zhaoqing Hengtai | Southwest, Group B | 2nd |
| Southwest | Sichuan Youth | Southwest, Group C | 1st |

== Third round ==
=== Groups ===
==== Group A ====
| Team | Pld | W | D | L | GF | GA | GD | Pts |
|---|---|---|---|---|---|---|---|---|
| Dalian Boyang (Q, C, P) | 3 | 2 | 1 | 0 | 6 | 1 | +5 | 7 |
| Wuhan Chufeng Heli (Q) | 3 | 1 | 2 | 0 | 4 | 3 | +1 | 5 |
| Zibo Sunday | 3 | 1 | 0 | 2 | 4 | 5 | -1 | 3 |
| Shanxi Dragon City | 3 | 0 | 1 | 2 | 7 | 12 | -5 | 1 |

| 7 November | Dalian Boyang | 5–1 | Shanxi Dragon City | Yangzhong Olympic Sports Centre, Zhenjiang |
| 08:45 |

| 7 November | Wuhan Chufeng Heli | 1–0 | Zibo Sunday | Yangzhong Olympic Sports Centre, Zhenjiang |
| 10:45 |

| 8 November | Shanxi Dragon City | 3–3 | Wuhan Chufeng Heli | Yangzhong Olympic Sports Centre, Zhenjiang |
| 08:45 |

| 8 November | Zibo Sunday | 0–1 | Dalian Boyang | Yangzhong Olympic Sports Centre, Zhenjiang |
| 10:45 |

| 10 November | Zibo Sunday | 4–3 | Shanxi Dragon City | Yangzhong Olympic Sports Centre, Zhenjiang |
| 08:45 |

| 10 November | Wuhan Chufeng Heli | 0–0 | Dalian Boyang | Zhenjiang Sports and Exhibition Center, Zhenjiang |
| 08:45 |

==== Group B ====
| Team | Pld | W | D | L | GF | GA | GD | Pts |
|---|---|---|---|---|---|---|---|---|
| Anhui Hefei Guiguan (Q) | 3 | 2 | 1 | 0 | 9 | 5 | +4 | 7 |
| Zhenjiang Huasa (Q, P) | 3 | 2 | 0 | 1 | 6 | 4 | +2 | 6 |
| Shenzhen Yisheng | 3 | 1 | 1 | 1 | 1 | 1 | 0 | 4 |
| Sichuan Youth | 3 | 0 | 0 | 3 | 4 | 10 | -6 | 0 |

| 6 November | Zhenjiang Huasa | 2–3 | Anhui Hefei Guiguan | Yangzhong Olympic Sports Centre, Zhenjiang |
| 19:00 |

| 7 November | Sichuan Youth | 0–1 | Shenzhen Yisheng | Yangzhong Olympic Sports Centre, Zhenjiang |
| 12:45 |

| 8 November | Shenzhen Yisheng | 0–0 | Anhui Hefei Guiguan | Yangzhong Olympic Sports Centre, Zhenjiang |
| 12:45 |

| 8 November | Zhenjiang Huasa | 3–1 | Sichuan Youth | Yangzhong Olympic Sports Centre, Zhenjiang |
| 14:45 |

| 10 November | Zhenjiang Huasa | 1–0 | Shenzhen Yisheng | Yangzhong Olympic Sports Centre, Zhenjiang |
| 10:45 |

| 10 November | Anhui Hefei Guiguan | 6–3 | Sichuan Youth | Zhenjiang Sports and Exhibition Center, Zhenjiang |
| 10:45 |

==== Group C ====
| Team | Pld | W | D | L | GF | GA | GD | Pts | |
|---|---|---|---|---|---|---|---|---|---|
| Wuxi Yinyang (Q) | 3 | 1 | 2 | 0 | 9 | 6 | +3 | 5 | Wuxi, GF=6; Shaanxi, GF=4; Zhaoqing, GF=2 |
| Shaanxi Chang'an Athletic (Q, P) | 3 | 1 | 2 | 0 | 6 | 4 | +2 | 5 | Wuxi, GF=6; Shaanxi, GF=4; Zhaoqing, GF=2 |
| Zhaoqing Hengtai | 3 | 1 | 2 | 0 | 5 | 2 | +3 | 5 | Wuxi, GF=6; Shaanxi, GF=4; Zhaoqing, GF=2 |
| Henan Orient Classic | 3 | 0 | 0 | 3 | 0 | 8 | -8 | 0 | |

| 7 November | Wuxi Yinyang | 3–0 | Henan Orient Classic | Zhenjiang Sports and Exhibition Center, Zhenjiang |
| 08:45 |

| 7 November | Shaanxi Chang'an Athletic | 0–0 | Zhaoqing Hengtai | Zhenjiang Sports and Exhibition Center, Zhenjiang |
| 10:45 |

| 8 November | Henan Orient Classic | 0–2 | Shaanxi Chang'an Athletic | Zhenjiang Sports and Exhibition Center, Zhenjiang |
| 08:45 |

| 8 November | Zhaoqing Hengtai | 2–2 | Wuxi Yinyang | Zhenjiang Sports and Exhibition Center, Zhenjiang |
| 10:45 |

| 10 November | Zhaoqing Hengtai | 3–0 | Henan Orient Classic | Yangzhong Olympic Sports Centre, Zhenjiang |
| 12:45 |

| 10 November | Shaanxi Chang'an Athletic | 4–4 | Wuxi Yinyang | Zhenjiang Sports and Exhibition Center, Zhenjiang |
| 12:45 |

==== Group D ====
| Team | Pld | W | D | L | GF | GA | GD | Pts |
|---|---|---|---|---|---|---|---|---|
| Jilin Baijia (Q, P) | 3 | 2 | 0 | 1 | 6 | 2 | +4 | 6 |
| Shanghai Sunfun (Q, P) | 3 | 2 | 0 | 1 | 7 | 5 | +2 | 6 |
| Zhuhai Suoka | 3 | 2 | 0 | 1 | 5 | 6 | -1 | 6 |
| Tianjin Kunshengsong | 3 | 0 | 0 | 3 | 2 | 7 | -5 | 0 |

| 7 November | Jilin Baijia | 1–0 | Tianjin Kunshengsong | Zhenjiang Sports and Exhibition Center, Zhenjiang |
| 12:45 |

| 7 November | Shanghai Sunfun | 1–3 | Zhuhai Suoka | Zhenjiang Sports and Exhibition Center, Zhenjiang |
| 14:45 |

| 8 November | Tianjin Kunshengsong | 1–4 | Shanghai Sunfun | Zhenjiang Sports and Exhibition Center, Zhenjiang |
| 12:45 |

| 8 November | Zhuhai Suoka | 0–4 | Jilin Baijia | Zhenjiang Sports and Exhibition Center, Zhenjiang |
| 14:45 |

| 10 November | Zhuhai Suoka | 2–1 | Tianjin Kunshengsong | Yangzhong Olympic Sports Centre, Zhenjiang |
| 14:45 |

| 10 November | Shanghai Sunfun | 2–1 | Jilin Baijia | Zhenjiang Sports and Exhibition Center, Zhenjiang |
| 14:45 |

=== Quarter-finals ===
| 11 November | Dalian Boyang (P) | 2–1 | Zhenjiang Huasa | Yangzhong Olympic Sports Centre, Zhenjiang |
| 10:00 |

| 11 November | Anhui Hefei Guiguan | 0–0 (3–5 p) | Wuhan Chufeng Heli | Yangzhong Olympic Sports Centre, Zhenjiang |
| 14:00 |

| 11 November | Wuxi Yinyang | 0–0 (6–7 p) | Shanghai Sunfun (P) | Zhenjiang Sports and Exhibition Center, Zhenjiang |
| 10:00 |

| 11 November | Jilin Baijia | 0–0 (5–6 p) | Shaanxi Chang'an Athletic (P) | Zhenjiang Sports and Exhibition Center, Zhenjiang |
| 14:00 |

=== 5th–8th place semifinals ===
| 13 November | Zhenjiang Huasa (P) | 1–0 | Wuxi Yinyang | Yangzhong Olympic Sports Centre, Zhenjiang |
| 10:00 |

| 13 November | Anhui Hefei Guiguan | 0–1 | Jilin Baijia (P) | Zhenjiang Sports and Exhibition Center, Zhenjiang |
| 10:00 |

=== Semi-finals ===
| 13 November | Dalian Boyang | 1–0 | Shanghai Sunfun | Yangzhong Olympic Sports Centre, Zhenjiang |
| 14:00 | Ge Yuxiang 17' |

| 13 November | Wuhan Chufeng Heli | 1–2 | Shaanxi Chang'an Athletic | Zhenjiang Sports and Exhibition Center, Zhenjiang |
| 14:00 |

=== Seventh-Place Match ===
| 14 November | Wuxi Yinyang | 2–3 | Anhui Hefei Guiguan | Zhenjiang Sports and Exhibition Center, Zhenjiang |
| 10:00 |

=== Fifth-Place Match ===
| 14 November | Zhenjiang Huasa | 3–4 | Jilin Baijia | Zhenjiang Sports and Exhibition Center, Zhenjiang |
| 14:00 |

=== Third-Place Match ===
| 14 November | Shanghai Sunfun | 0–0 (5–6 p) | Wuhan Chufeng Heli | Yangzhong Olympic Sports Centre, Zhenjiang |
| 10:00 |

=== Final ===
| 14 November | Dalian Boyang | 0–0 (6–5 p) | Shaanxi Chang'an Athletic | Yangzhong Olympic Sports Centre, Zhenjiang |
| 14:00 |
