= Chen Bo (footballer) =

Chinese football player

Chen Bo 陈博
Personal information
- Date of birth: 4 August 1989 (age 37)
- Place of birth: Wuhan, Hubei, China
- Height: 1.77 m (5 ft 10 in)
- Position: Defender

Senior career*
Years	Team	Apps	(Gls)
2011–2014	Chengdu Tiancheng	26	(0)
2015–2018	Yinchuan Helanshan	75	(7)
2019–2020	Qingdao Jonoon	29	(2)
2021–2022	Guangxi Pingguo Haliao	36	(0)
2023	Shanxi Chongde Ronghai	0	(0)
- * Club domestic league appearances and goals as of 31 December 2020

Chen Bo (Chinese: 陈博; born 4 August 1989 in Wuhan) is a Chinese football player.

== Club career ==
In 2011, Chen Bo started his professional footballer career with Chengdu Tiancheng in the Chinese Super League. He would eventually make his league debut for Chengdu on 6 July 2011 in a game against Guangzhou Evergrande, coming on as a substitute for Peng Xinli in the 85th minute. In March 2015, Chen transferred to China League Two side Yinchuan Helanshan.

On 24 January 2019, Chen transferred to fellow League Two side Qingdao Jonoon.

== Career statistics ==
Statistics accurate as of match played 31 December 2020.

Appearances and goals by club, season and competition
Club	Season	League			National Cup		Continental		Other		Total	
Club	Season	Division	Apps	Goals	Apps	Goals	Apps	Goals	Apps	Goals	Apps	Goals
Chengdu Tiancheng	2011	Chinese Super League	3	0	0	0	-		-		3	0
Chengdu Tiancheng	2012	China League One	17	0	2	0	-		-		19	0
Chengdu Tiancheng	2013	China League One	4	0	0	0	-		-		4	0
Chengdu Tiancheng	2014	China League One	2	0	0	0	-		-		2	0
Chengdu Tiancheng	Total		26	0	2	0	0	0	0	0	28	0
Yinchuan Helanshan	2015	China League Two	13	1	2	1	-		-		15	2
Yinchuan Helanshan	2016	China League Two	19	1	2	0	-		-		21	1
Yinchuan Helanshan	2017	China League Two	17	1	2	0	-		-		19	1
Yinchuan Helanshan	2018	China League Two	26	4	3	1	-		-		29	5
Yinchuan Helanshan	Total		75	7	9	2	0	0	0	0	84	9
Qingdao Jonoon	2019	China League Two	22	2	2	0	-		-		24	2
Qingdao Jonoon	2020	China League Two	7	0	-		-		-		7	0
Qingdao Jonoon	Total		29	2	2	0	0	0	0	0	31	0
Career total			130	9	13	2	0	0	0	0	143	11
