= Shanghai Sunfun F.C. =

Shanghai Sunfun Shànghǎi Shēnfàn 上海申梵
- Full name: Shanghai Sunfun Football Club 上海申梵足球俱乐部
- Founded: 2012; 14 years ago
- Dissolved: 2018
- Ground: Fengxian Chemical Industry Park Sports Centre Stadium, Shanghai
- Chairman: Zhou Liang (周亮)
- 2018: League Two, 26th
| Home colours | Away colours |

Shanghai Sunfun Football Club (Chinese: 上海申梵足球俱乐部) was a professional football club based in Shanghai, China, that most recently participated in China League Two.

== History ==
The club was originally founded in 2012 as Shanghai Sun & Fun F.C. (Chinese: 上海森梵足球俱乐部). On 30 December 2015, they changed their name to Shanghai Sunfun F.C. (Chinese: 上海申梵足球俱乐部). They played in the 2016 China Amateur Football League and won the winners of 2016 Shanghai Chen Yi Cup and the first place of southeast region final–group A successively. Shanghai Sunfun finished the 4th place in the national finals and won promotion to 2017 China League Two.

In 2018, the club's chairman and former football commentator, Zhou Liang, was arrested, and the club was dissolved afterwards.

== Name history ==
- 2012–2015 Shanghai Sun & Fun F.C. 上海森梵
- 2015–2018 Shanghai Sunfun F.C. 上海申梵

== Managerial history ==
- (China) Cheng Liang (2016–2017)
- (Japan) Teshima Atsushi (2018)
- (China) Zhang Zhigang (2018)

== Results ==
All-time league rankings

As of the end of 2018 season.

| Year | Div | Pld | W | D | L | GF | GA | GD | Pts | Pos. | FA Cup | Super Cup | AFC | Att./G | Stadium |
|---|---|---|---|---|---|---|---|---|---|---|---|---|---|---|---|
| 2016 | 4 | | | | | | | | | 4 | DNQ | DNQ | DNQ | | |
| 2017 | 3 | 24 | 5 | 4 | 15 | 21 | 53 | -32 | 19 | 18 | R3 | DNQ | DNQ | | Fengxian Chemical Industry Park Sports Centre Stadium |
| 2018 | 3 | 28 | 3 | 2 | 23 | 18 | 79 | -61 | 11 | 26 | R2 | DNQ | DNQ | 115 | Fengxian Chemical Industry Park Sports Centre Stadium |

Key

| | China top division |
| | China second division |
| | China third division |
| | China fourth division |
| W | Winners |
| RU | Runners-up |
| 3 | Third place |
| | Relegated |

- Pld = Played
- W = Games won
- D = Games drawn
- L = Games lost
- F = Goals for
- A = Goals against
- Pts = Points
- Pos = Final position
- DNQ = Did not qualify
- DNE = Did not enter
- NH = Not held
- – = Does not exist
- R1 = Round 1
- R2 = Round 2
- R3 = Round 3
- R4 = Round 4
- F = Final
- SF = Semi-finals
- QF = Quarter-finals
- R16 = Round of 16
- Group = Group stage
- GS2 = Second Group stage
- QR1 = First Qualifying Round
- QR2 = Second Qualifying Round
- QR3 = Third Qualifying Round
