= Yi Baidi =

Chinese footballer

Yi Baidi 易白荻
Personal information
- Full name: Yi Baidi
- Date of birth: 10 October 1993 (age 33)
- Place of birth: Shenzhen, Guangdong, China
- Height: 1.83 m (6 ft 0 in)
- Position: Midfielder

Team information
- Current team: Jiangsu Yancheng Dingli
- Number: 8

Youth career
- Shenzhen Yantian Sports School
- Hangzhou Greentown

Senior career*
| Years | Team | Apps | (Gls) |
| 2011 | Wenzhou Provenza | 18 | (0) |
| 2013–2016 | Hangzhou Greentown | 1 | (0) |
| 2017– | Jiangsu Yancheng Dingli | 54 | (9) |
- * Club domestic league appearances and goals as of 12 October 2019

Yi Baidi (Chinese: 易白荻; born 10 October 1993 in Shenzhen) is a Chinese footballer who plays for Jiangsu Yancheng Dingli in the China League Two.

== Club career ==
Yi Baidi joined the Hangzhou Greentown youth team system from Shenzhen Yantian Sports School. He started his professional football career in 2011 when he was loaned to Wenzhou Provenza's squad for the 2011 China League Two campaign. Yi was promoted to Hangzhou Greentown first team squad in 2013. On 22 May 2013, he made his debut for Hangzhou in the third round of 2013 Chinese FA Cup against amateur team Wuhan Hongxin in a 1–0 home victory. He scored his first goal on 15 July 2014, in the third round of 2014 Chinese FA Cup against Beijing BIT. On 5 October 2014, Yi made his Super League debut in a 4–0 away defeat against Guangzhou Evergrande, coming on as a substitute for Zang Yifeng in the 75th minute.

== Career statistics ==
Statistics accurate as of match played 12 October 2019.

| Club performance | | | League | | Cup | | League Cup | | Continental | | Total | |
| Season | Club | League | Apps | Goals | Apps | Goals | Apps | Goals | Apps | Goals | Apps | Goals |
| China PR | | | League | | FA Cup | | CSL Cup | | Asia | | Total | |
|---|---|---|---|---|---|---|---|---|---|---|---|---|
| 2011 | Wenzhou Provenza | China League Two | 18 | 0 | - | | - | | - | | 18 | 0 |
| 2013 | Hangzhou Greentown | Chinese Super League | 0 | 0 | 2 | 0 | - | | - | | 2 | 0 |
| 2014 | Hangzhou Greentown | Chinese Super League | 1 | 0 | 2 | 1 | - | | - | | 3 | 1 |
| 2015 | Hangzhou Greentown | Chinese Super League | 0 | 0 | 1 | 0 | - | | - | | 1 | 0 |
| 2017 | Jiangsu Yancheng Dingli | China League Two | 17 | 3 | 1 | 0 | - | | - | | 18 | 3 |
| 2018 | Jiangsu Yancheng Dingli | China League Two | 11 | 0 | 0 | 0 | - | | - | | 11 | 0 |
| 2019 | Jiangsu Yancheng Dingli | China League Two | 26 | 6 | 0 | 0 | - | | - | | 26 | 6 |
| Total | China PR | | 73 | 9 | 6 | 1 | 0 | 0 | 0 | 0 | 79 | 10 |
