= Nanjing City F.C. =

Chinese football club

Nanjing City 南京城市
- Full name: Nanjing City Football Club 南京城市足球俱乐部
- Founded: 29 December 2014; 11 years ago
- Ground: Wutaishan Stadium
- Capacity: 22,000
- Manager: (Bulgaria) Zoran Janković
- League: China League One
- 2025: China League One, 11th of 16
Home colours	Away colours

Nanjing City Football Club (Chinese: 南京城市足球俱乐部; pinyin: Nánjīng Chéngshì Zúqiú Jùlèbù) is a Chinese professional football club based in Nanjing, Jiangsu, that competes in China League One, the second tier of Chinese football. Nanjing City plays its home matches at the Wutaishan Stadium, located within Gulou District.

== History ==
The club was founded on 29 December 2014 as Nanjing Fengfan F.C. and participated within the Nanjing City League Second Division by the Nanjing Civil Affairs Bureau. Initially formed as youth football training club, on 1 November 2017, the club completed their Chinese Football Association (CFA) registration to participate within the Nanjing Football Association Super League and take part within the Chinese football pyramid. A seventh-place finish and eighth-place finish in the 2018 league season would be enough to qualify for the 2019 Chinese Champions League where they won the division title and promotion to the China League Two.

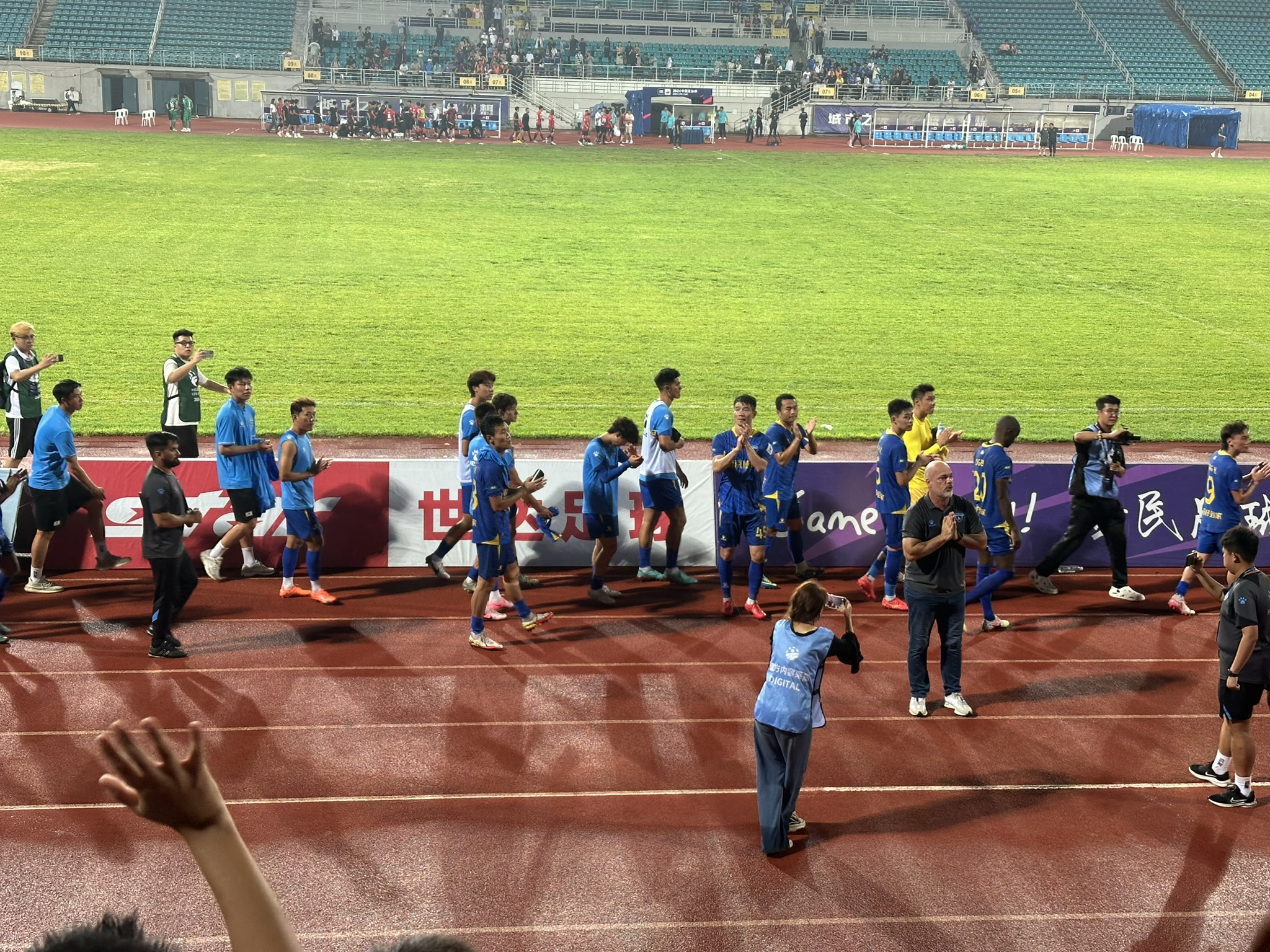
Nanjing City players after a match with Chengdu Rongcheng in August 2024

In January 2021, Nanjing Fengfan F.C. changed their name to Nanjing City.

== Players ==
=== Current squad ===
As of July 2026

Note: Flags indicate national team as defined under FIFA eligibility rules; some limited exceptions apply. Players may hold more than one non-FIFA nationality.

No.	Pos.	Nation	Player
2	DF	CHN	Wang Xijie
4	DF	CHN	Zhao Chengle
5	MF	HKG	Wong Wai
6	MF	CHN	Zhou Yuhao
8	MF	CHN	Yang Dejiang
9	FW	BRA	Zé Vitor
10	FW	CMR	Jerome Ngom Mbekeli
11	MF	CHN	Hu Rentian
13	DF	CHN	Zhai Zhaoyu
14	FW	CHN	Weli Qurban
15	DF	CHN	Shewketjan Tayir (on loan from Wuhan Three Towns)
16	DF	CHN	Yang He
17	MF	CHN	An Bang
18	FW	CHN	Dong Honglin
19	MF	CHN	Ma Fuyu
20	DF	CHN	Liu Le

No.	Pos.	Nation	Player
21	GK	CHN	Xi Anjie
22	DF	CHN	Meng Zhen
23	FW	CHN	Hu Jinghang
24	DF	CHN	Du Junpeng
25	FW	BRA	Bruno Baio
26	GK	CHN	Yang Chao
27	MF	CHN	Zheng Xuejian
28	MF	CHN	Han Qizhen
29	MF	CHN	Fu Shang
30	DF	CHN	Wei Minghe
31	MF	CHN	Zhu Qiwen
32	DF	CHN	Yang Ziqi
33	FW	CHN	Xiang Rongjun
37	DF	CHN	Dong Huayang
45	GK	CHN	Zheng Hao

=== Out on loan ===
Note: Flags indicate national team as defined under FIFA eligibility rules; some limited exceptions apply. Players may hold more than one non-FIFA nationality.

No.	Pos.	Nation	Player
—	FW	CHN	Nurzat Nurlan (on loan to Shanxi Chongde Ronghai until 31 December 2026)

== Managerial history ==
- (China) Yin Youyou (2018–2019)
- (China) Tang Bo (2020)
- (Italy) Fulvio Pea (2021)
- (China) Zhang Xiaofeng (2022)
- (Spain) Óscar Céspedes (2022–2023)
- (China) Cao Rui (2023–2024)
- (South Korea) Kim Jong-boo (2024)
- (Brazil) Fábio Cortez (2024)
- (China) Zhang Xiaofeng (2024)
- (China) Liu Zhiyu (2024–2025)
- (China) Zhang Xiaofeng (2025)
- (Brazil) Rodney Gonçalves (2026)
- (China) Zhang Xiaofeng (2026)
- (China) Li Yinan (2026)
- (Bulgaria) Zoran Janković (2026–present)

== Honours ==
League

- China League Two
  - Play-off winners: 2020
- CMCL
  - Champions: 2019

== Results ==
All-time league rankings

As of the end of 2020 season.

Season	Division		Pld	W	D	L	GF	GA	GD	Pts	Pos.		FA Cup	Super Cup	AFC	Att./G	Stadium
2019	4	Group J	4	4	0	0	26	0	26	12	1	W	-	-	-	-	-
2019	4	North Group	7	7	0	0	23	2	21	21	1	W	-	-	-	-	-
2020	3	Group A	9	8	1	0	16	4	12	25	1	3	-	-	-	-	-

Key

	China top division
	China second division
	China third division
	China fourth division
W	Winners
RU	Runners-up
3	Third place
	Relegated

- Pld = Played
- W = Games won
- D = Games drawn
- L = Games lost
- F = Goals for
- A = Goals against
- Pts = Points
- Pos = Final position
- DNQ = Did not qualify
- DNE = Did not enter
- NH = Not held
- – = Does not exist
- R1 = Round 1
- R2 = Round 2
- R3 = Round 3
- R4 = Round 4
- F = Final
- SF = Semi-finals
- QF = Quarter-finals
- R16 = Round of 16
- Group = Group stage
- GS2 = Second Group stage
- QR1 = First Qualifying Round
- QR2 = Second Qualifying Round
- QR3 = Third Qualifying Round
