= Qingdao University of Science and Technology F.C. =

Chinese football club

Qingdao QUST 青岛青科
- Full name: Qingdao University of Science and Technology F.C. 青岛青科足球俱乐部
- Founded: 2005
- Ground: Qingdao Hushan Stadium, Qingdao, Shandong, China
- Capacity: 5,000
- Chairman: Guo Zuojin
- League: China Amateur Football League
- 2016: 4th, Southeast Group A
Home colours	Away colours

Qingdao University of Science and Technology F.C. (Chinese: 青岛青科足球俱乐部) are a professional football club based in Qingdao, Shandong in China where they play their home games in the Qingdao Hushan Stadium. The club was founded in 2005 by the Qingdao University of Science and Technology as an amateur college football team before turning professional in 2009 when they gained sponsorship and joined the bottom of the Chinese pyramid by playing in the Chinese Yi League.

== History ==
The club was founded in 2005 by the Qingdao University of Science and Technology as an amateur college football team named Qingdao Haizhiying F.C., where they played in the local university and regional league system. After gaining some significant success within these leagues, the club would gain interest from some sponsors and produce enough funds for the 3 million Yuan required to turn professional and enter the bottom of the Chinese pyramid by playing in the Chinese Yi League, and renaming itself Qingdao University of Science and Technology F.C.. The club's debut season in the 2009 Chinese League Two was, however, a huge disappointment- and the club finished rock-bottom within their division. This saw the club decide to remain absent in the 2010 league season and return to their regional league, however the club would return to professional football in 2011.

== Name changes ==
- 2005–2008 Qingdao Haizhiying F.C. 青岛海之鹰
- 2009– Qingdao University of Science and Technology F.C. 青岛青科

== See also ==
- Qingdao University of Science and Technology
