= Guangxi Longguida F.C. =

Chinese football club

Guangxi Longguida 广西龙桂达
- Full name: Guangxi Longguida Football Club 广西龙桂达足球俱乐部
- Founded: 2014; 12 years ago
- Ground: Nanning, Guangxi
- League: China Amateur Football League
- 2016: 3rd, Southwest Group B

Guangxi Longguida Football Club is an association football club from Guangxi, China. They compete in the China Amateur Football League. The Guangxi Sports Center Stadium, which has a capacity of 60,000, is their home venue.

== History ==
Guangxi Longguida F.C. was established in December 2014. They played in the 2014 China Amateur Football League finished the 4th place and won promotion to 2015 China League Two. After a stellar 2015 season, The club had to sell their Chinese FA registration and entire first-team to Nantong Zhiyun F.C. The following 2016 league campaign saw the club start at the bottom of the Chinese pyramid in the fourth tier with a team assembled from their former reserve squad.

== Name history ==
- 2014–2015 Guangxi Longguida 广西龙桂达
- 2016 Guangxi Wodema 广西沃德玛
- 2017– Guangxi Longguida 广西龙桂达

== Managerial history ==
- (China) Huang Yong (2015)
- (China) Huang Feng (2016)

== Results ==
All-time league rankings

As of the end of 2016 season.

Year	Div	Pld	W	D	L	GF	GA	GD	Pts	Pos.	FA Cup	Super Cup	AFC	Att./G	Stadium
2014	4									4	DNQ	DNQ	DNQ		
2015	3	14	2	2	10	10	24	−14	8	7^{1}	R2	DNQ	DNQ	1607	Dongxing Sports Center Stadium
2016	4									3^{1}	DNQ	DNQ	DNQ		

- ^1 in group stage.

Key

	China top division
	China second division
	China third division
	China fourth division
W	Winners
RU	Runners-up
3	Third place
	Relegated

- Pld = Played
- W = Games won
- D = Games drawn
- L = Games lost
- F = Goals for
- A = Goals against
- Pts = Points
- Pos = Final position
- DNQ = Did not qualify
- DNE = Did not enter
- NH = Not Held
- – = Does Not Exist
- R1 = Round 1
- R2 = Round 2
- R3 = Round 3
- R4 = Round 4
- F = Final
- SF = Semi-finals
- QF = Quarter-finals
- R16 = Round of 16
- Group = Group stage
- GS2 = Second Group stage
- QR1 = First Qualifying Round
- QR2 = Second Qualifying Round
- QR3 = Third Qualifying Round
