= Wang Qi (footballer, born November 1993) =

Chinese association football player

Personal information
- Date of birth: 13 November 1993 (age 32)
- Place of birth: Yantai, Shandong, China
- Height: 1.87 m (6 ft 2 in)
- Position: Goalkeeper

Youth career
- –2015: Qingdao Jonoon

Senior career*
Years	Team	Apps	(Gls)
2015–2018	Qingdao Jonoon	59	(0)
2019–2022	Shaanxi Chang'an Athletic	39	(0)
2023	Qingdao West Coast	0	(0)
2024	Jiangxi Lushan	10	(0)
- * Club domestic league appearances and goals as of 14:01, 26 July 2021 (UTC)

Wang Qi (Chinese: 王琦; born 13 November 1993) is a Chinese former footballer who played as a goalkeeper.

On 10 September 2024, Chinese Football Association announced that Wang was banned from football-related activities for lifetime for involving in match-fixing.

== Career statistics ==
=== Club ===
As of 25 July 2021.

Club	Season	League			Cup		Continental		Other		Total	
Club	Season	Division	Apps	Goals	Apps	Goals	Apps	Goals	Apps	Goals	Apps	Goals
Qingdao Jonoon	2015	China League One	0	0	1 (Note: Appearances in the Chinese FA Cup)	0	–		0	0	1	0
Qingdao Jonoon	2016	China League One	2	0	2	0	–		0	0	4	0
Qingdao Jonoon	2017	China League Two	22	0	1	0	–		2 (Note: Appearances in the China League Two playoffs)	0	25	0
Qingdao Jonoon	2018	China League Two	25	0	1	0	–		2	0	28	0
Qingdao Jonoon	Total		59	0	5	0	0	0	4	0	68	0
Shaanxi Chang'an Athletic	2019	China League One	14	0	2	0	–		0	0	16	0
Shaanxi Chang'an Athletic	2020	China League One	13	0	0	0	–		0	0	13	0
Shaanxi Chang'an Athletic	2021	China League One	12	0	0	0	–		0	0	12	0
Shaanxi Chang'an Athletic	Total		39	0	2	0	0	0	0	0	41	0
Career total			98	0	7	0	0	0	4	0	109	0
