= Shewketjan Tayir =

Chinese association football player

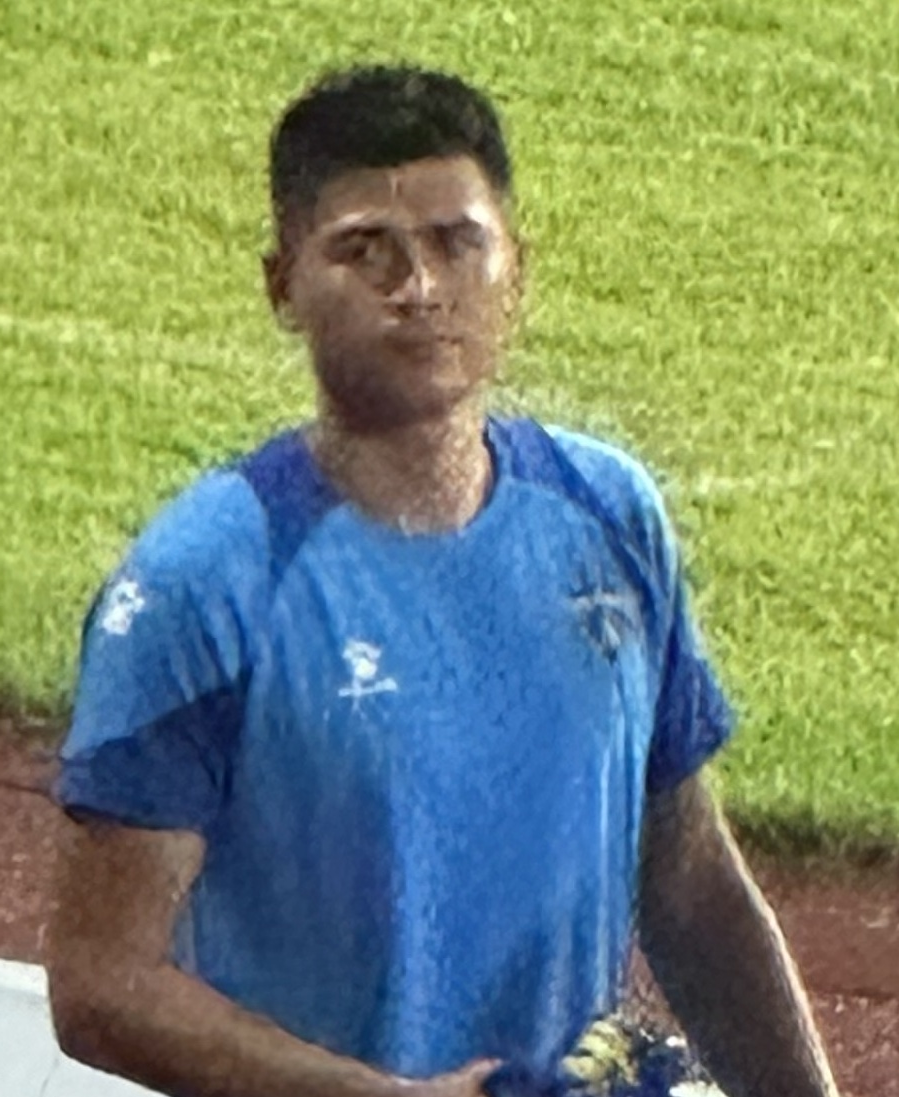
- Shewketjan in August 2024

Personal information
- Date of birth: 11 May 2001 (age 25)
- Place of birth: Turpan, Xinjiang, China
- Height: 1.85 m (6 ft 1 in)
- Position: Defender

Team information
- Current team: Nanjing City (on loan from Wuhan Three Towns)
- Number: 25

Youth career
- –2019: Xinjiang FA

Senior career*
| Years | Team | Apps | (Gls) |
| 2019–2021 | Xinjiang Snowland | - | (-) |
| 2021 | → China U20 (loan) | 1 | (0) |
| 2022– | Wuhan Three Towns | 1 | (0) |
| 2023 | → Hainan Star (loan) | 18 | (1) |
| 2024 | → Nanjing City (loan) | 11 | (0) |
| 2025 | → Nanjing City (loan) | 7 | (0) |
| 2026– | → Nanjing City (loan) | 0 | (0) |

International career^{‡}
| 2018 | China U17 | 5 | (0) |
| 2019 | China U18 | 3 | (0) |
- * Club domestic league appearances and goals as of 11 January 2023 ‡ National team caps and goals as of 08:01, 25 December 2021 (UTC)

Shewketjan Tayir (Chinese: 肖开提江·塔依尔; born 11 May 2001) is a Chinese footballer currently playing as a defender for Nanjing City, on loan from Wuhan Three Towns.

== Club career ==
Shewketjan Tayir would join lower league side Xinjiang Snowland in November 2019 before gaining the attention of the Chinese U19 team. In the 2021 China League Two season the Chinese U20 team were invited to participate within the Chinese pyramid and Shewketjan was loaned out to them. He would make his debut for them in a Chinese FA Cup game on 13 October 2021 against Dalian Professional in a 2-1 defeat.

On 27 April 2022, he signed with newly promoted top tier side Wuhan Three Towns. He would go on to make his debut on 17 November 2022, in a Chinese FA Cup game against Dandong Tengyue, which ended in a 5-1 victory. After the game he would go on to establish himself as a squad player within the team that won the 2022 Chinese Super League title.

== Career statistics ==
As of 11 January 2023.

| Club | Season | League | | | Cup | | Continental | | Other | | Total | |
| Club | Season | Division | Apps | Goals | Apps | Goals | Apps | Goals | Apps | Goals | Apps | Goals |
|---|---|---|---|---|---|---|---|---|---|---|---|---|
| Xinjiang Snowland | 2019 | Xinjiang FA Champions League | - | | - | | - | | - | | - | |
| Xinjiang Snowland | 2020 | Xinjiang FA Champions League | - | | - | | - | | - | | - | |
| Xinjiang Snowland | Total | | 0 | 0 | 0 | 0 | 0 | 0 | 0 | 0 | 0 | 0 |
| China U20 (loan) | 2021 | China League Two | 1 | 0 | 1 | 0 | - | | - | | 2 | 0 |
| Wuhan Three Towns | 2022 | Chinese Super League | 0 | 0 | 3 | 0 | - | | - | | 3 | 0 |
| Career total | | | 1 | 0 | 4 | 0 | 0 | 0 | 0 | 0 | 5 | 0 |

== Honours ==
=== Club ===
Wuhan Three Towns

- Chinese Super League: 2022.
