= Li Zhuangfei =

Chinese footballer (born 1988)

Li Zhuangfei 李壮飞
Personal information
- Full name: Li Zhuangfei
- Date of birth: January 24, 1988 (age 38)
- Place of birth: Zibo, Shandong, China
- Height: 1.78 m (5 ft 10 in)
- Positions: Midfielder; defender

Youth career
- 2000–2006: Shandong Luneng

Senior career*
Years	Team	Apps	(Gls)
2006	Shandong Luneng	0	(0)
2006	→ Xiamen Lanshi (loan)	19	(0)
2007	Wuhan Guanggu	2	(0)
2008–2009	Jiangsu Sainty	7	(1)
2010–2017	Qingdao Jonoon	76	(1)
2017	→ Yunnan Lijiang (loan)	10	(0)
2018–2020	Zibo Sunday	59	(3)

International career
2005	China U17	4	(0)

Managerial career
- 2021-: China U14 (assistant)
Medal record
Representing China
Men's football
AFC U-17 Championship
Gold medal – first place	2004 Japan	Team
- * Club domestic league appearances and goals as of 31 December 2020

Li Zhuangfei (simplified Chinese: 李壮飞; traditional Chinese: 李壯飛; pinyin: Lǐ Zhuàngfēi; born 24 January 1988 in Zibo) is a Chinese former football player.

== Club career ==
Li Zhuangfei began his football career playing for the various Shandong Luneng youth teams and showed great potential by being called up for the Chinese U-17 team that won the 2004 AFC U-17 Championship. Li, however, struggled to break into the Shandong senior team and was instead loaned out to the newly promoted top-tier side Xiamen Lanshi in 2006. He made his league debut for Xiamen on March 18, 2006, against Shanghai Shenhua in a 2-2 draw where he came on as a substitute for Zou Yougen. After the game Li gradually became the first-choice defensive midfielder in the team, and the club's manager Gao Hongbo hailed him as the most promising Chinese star among his age.

After his loan period with Xiamen ended Li joined top-tier side Wuhan Guanggu on a deal that brought him to Wuhan with several other Shandong Luneng players that included Ren Yongshun, Guo Mingyue and Deng Xiaofei. However, due to some bad relationship with local players, most Shandong players in the team were purged at the end of the season except Deng Xiaofei.

He transferred to second-tier club Jiangsu Sainty in the 2008 league season where he was awarded No.10 jersey and played in six games and scored one goal to help aid Jiangsu to the division title as well as promotion to the top tier. Within the top tier Li saw even less playing time and only made one appearance throughout the season as the club finished in mid-table. This saw Li decide to move to top-tier club Qingdao Jonoon half-way through the 2010 league season where he made his debut for the club in a league game on July 18, 2010, against Changsha Ginde, which ended in a 2-0 victory for Qingdao.

In 2010, Li signed for Qingdao Jonoon. Li was loaned to China League One side Yunan Lijiang for half season on 10 July 2017.

In February 2018, Li transferred to League Two side Zibo Sunday.

== National team ==
Li was the captain of China U-17 National Team compete in the 2005 FIFA U-17 World Championship.

== Career statistics ==
Statistics accurate as of match played 31 December 2020.

Appearances and goals by club, season and competition
Club	Season	League			National Cup		Continental		Other		Total	
Club	Season	Division	Apps	Goals	Apps	Goals	Apps	Goals	Apps	Goals	Apps	Goals
Shandong Luneng	2006	Chinese Super League	0	0	0	0	-		-		0	0
Xiamen Lanshi (loan)	2006	Chinese Super League	19	0	0	0	-		-		19	0
Wuhan Guanggu	2007	Chinese Super League	2	0	-		-		-		2	0
Jiangsu Sainty	2008	China League One	3	1	-		-		-		3	1
Jiangsu Sainty	2009	Chinese Super League	4	0	-		-		-		4	0
Jiangsu Sainty	Total		7	1	0	0	0	0	0	0	7	1
Qingdao Jonoon	2010	Chinese Super League	9	0	-		-		-		9	0
Qingdao Jonoon	2011	Chinese Super League	7	0	0	0	-		-		7	0
Qingdao Jonoon	2012	Chinese Super League	3	0	0	0	-		-		3	0
Qingdao Jonoon	2013	Chinese Super League	11	0	2	0	-		-		13	0
Qingdao Jonoon	2014	China League One	5	1	1	0	-		-		6	1
Qingdao Jonoon	2015	China League One	14	0	1	0	-		-		15	0
Qingdao Jonoon	2016	China League One	22	0	0	0	-		-		22	0
Qingdao Jonoon	2017	China League Two	5	0	0	0	-		-		5	0
Qingdao Jonoon	Total		76	1	4	0	0	0	0	0	80	1
Yunnan Lijiang (loan)	2017	China League One	10	0	0	0	-		-		10	0
Zibo Cuju	2018	China League Two	26	2	2	1	-		-		28	3
Zibo Cuju	2019	China League Two	22	0	2	0	-		-		24	0
Zibo Cuju	2020	China League Two	11	1	-		-		-		11	1
Zibo Cuju	Total		59	3	4	1	0	0	0	0	63	4
Career total			173	5	8	1	0	0	0	0	181	6

== Honours ==
=== Club ===
Jiangsu Sainty

- China League One: 2008

=== International ===
China U-17

- AFC U-17 Championship: 2004
