= Yang Dejiang =

Chinese association football player

Personal information
- Date of birth: 31 August 2004 (age 22)
- Place of birth: Shenzhen, Guangdong, China
- Height: 1.75 m (5 ft 9 in)
- Position: Midfielder

Team information
- Current team: Nanjing City
- Number: 8

Youth career
- –2020: Shenzhen FA
- 2020–2021: Guangzhou Evergrande

Senior career*
| Years | Team | Apps | (Gls) |
| 2021–2024 | Guangzhou FC | 21 | (1) |
| 2025– | Nanjing City | 23 | (0) |

International career^{‡}
| 2018–2020 | China U16 | | |
- * Club domestic league appearances and goals as of 9 March 2026 ‡ National team caps and goals as of 14:01, 4 May 2021 (UTC)

Yang Dejiang (Chinese: 杨德江; born 31 August 2004) is a Chinese footballer currently playing as a midfielder for Nanjing City.

== Club career ==
Yang was promoted to the senior team of Guangzhou FC for the 2021 Chinese Super League season, making his debut on 2 May 2021 against Shenzhen FC in a 2-0 victory. He was with the club as it experienced financial instability and suffered relegation following the 2022 Chinese Super League campaign, ending its twelve-season stay in the top flight. Yang, however, remained with the club and went on to establish himself as a regular squad member in the team.

== Career statistics ==
As of 26 March 2024.

| Club | Season | League | | | Cup | | Continental | | Other | | Total | |
| Club | Season | Division | Apps | Goals | Apps | Goals | Apps | Goals | Apps | Goals | Apps | Goals |
|---|---|---|---|---|---|---|---|---|---|---|---|---|
| Guangzhou FC | 2021 | Chinese Super League | 1 | 0 | 1 | 0 | 2 (Note: Appearances in the AFC Champions League) | 0 | – | | 4 | 0 |
| Guangzhou FC | 2022 | Chinese Super League | 0 | 0 | 0 | 0 | 0 | 0 | – | | 0 | 0 |
| Guangzhou FC | 2023 | China League One | 8 | 1 | 0 | 0 | – | | – | | 8 | 1 |
| Guangzhou FC | 2024 | China League One | 1 | 0 | 0 | 0 | – | | – | | 1 | 0 |
| Career total | | | 10 | 1 | 1 | 0 | 2 | 0 | 0 | 0 | 13 | 1 |
