= Yang Chao (footballer) =

Chinese association football player

Personal information
- Date of birth: 3 August 1993 (age 33)
- Height: 1.88 m (6 ft 2 in)
- Position: Goalkeeper

Team information
- Current team: Nanjing City
- Number: 26

Senior career*
Years	Team	Apps	(Gls)
2013–2020	Guangdong South China Tiger	64	(0)
2020–2022	Sichuan Jiuniu	43	(0)
2023	Shanghai Jiading Huilong	3	(0)
2023–2025	Foshan Nanshi	58	(0)
2026–	Nanjing City	1	(0)
- * Club domestic league appearances and goals as of 15 March 2026

Yang Chao (Chinese: 杨超; born 3 August 1993) is a Chinese footballer currently playing as a goalkeeper for China League One club Nanjing City.

== Career statistics ==
=== Club ===
As of match played 8 November 2025.

Club	Season	League			Cup		Continental		Other		Total	
Club	Season	Division	Apps	Goals	Apps	Goals	Apps	Goals	Apps	Goals	Apps	Goals
Meixian Techand/ Guangdong South China Tiger	2013	China League Two	–		1 (Note: Appearances in the Chinese FA Cup)	0	–		0	0	1	0
Meixian Techand/ Guangdong South China Tiger	2014	China League Two	–		0	0	–		0	0	0	0
Meixian Techand/ Guangdong South China Tiger	2015	China League Two	6	0	1	0	–		1 (Note: Appearances in the China League Two playoffs)	0	8	0
Meixian Techand/ Guangdong South China Tiger	2016	China League Two	1	0	1	0	–		0	0	2	0
Meixian Techand/ Guangdong South China Tiger	2017	China League Two	3	0	2	0	–		5	0	10	0
Meixian Techand/ Guangdong South China Tiger	2018	China League One	25	0	0	0	–		2	0	27	0
Meixian Techand/ Guangdong South China Tiger	2019	China League One	29	0	0	0	–		0	0	29	0
Meixian Techand/ Guangdong South China Tiger	Total		64	0	5	0	0	0	8	0	77	0
Sichuan Jiuniu	2020	China League One	4	0	–		–		–		4	0
Sichuan Jiuniu	2021	China League One	33	0	5	0	–		–		38	0
Sichuan Jiuniu	2022	China League One	6	0	1	0	–		–		7	0
Sichuan Jiuniu	Total		43	0	6	0	0	0	0	0	49	0
Shanghai Jiading Huilong	2023	China League One	3	0	0	0	–		–		3	0
Foshan Nanshi	2023	China League One	0	0	–		–		–		0	0
Foshan Nanshi	2024	China League One	28	0	0	0	–		–		28	0
Foshan Nanshi	2025	China League One	30	0	0	0	–		–		30	0
Foshan Nanshi	Total		58	0	0	0	0	0	0	0	58	0
Career total			168	0	11	0	0	0	8	0	187	0
