= Zhenjiang Sports and Exhibition Center =

Sports venue in Zhenjiang, Jiangsu, China

- 镇江体育会展中心
- Location in Jiangsu Zhenjiang Sports and Exhibition Center (China)
- Location: Nanxu New Town, Zhenjiang, Jiangsu, China
- Coordinates: 32.1769°N 119.4220°E
- Capacity: 31,200 (stadium), 6,405 (arena)

Website
- www.zjtycyfzyxgs.com

The Zhenjiang Sports and Exhibition Center (Chinese: 镇江体育会展中心) is a complex of sports and exhibition facilities in Zhenjiang, Jiangsu, China. It is located in the center of Nanxu New Town (南徐新城), north of Danshan Park (蛋山公园), occupying an area of 690 mu.

The complex comprises a multi-purpose stadium named Zhenjiang Sports Centre Stadium with 31,200 seats, a separate 77,537-square-meter indoor stadium and exhibition building, and a 41,115-square-meter comprehensive training building. The indoor stadium has a seating capacity of 6,405, including 4,845 fixed seats and 1560 moveable ones, and the exhibition hall can accommodate 503 standard-sized stalls. The comprehensive training building, also called the Citizens' Sport Center, includes a swimming and diving center, a tennis center, a table tennis center, and other facilities for aerobics, dancing, martial arts, etc.
