= Kazuo Uchida =

Japanese footballer and manager

Kazuo Uchida 内田 一夫
Personal information
- Full name: Kazuo Uchida
- Date of birth: April 18, 1962 (age 64)
- Place of birth: Shizuoka, Shizuoka, Japan
- Height: 1.65 m (5 ft 5 in)

Youth career
- Years: Team
- Shimizu Higashi High School
- Komazawa University

Managerial career
- 2004: Japan U-17 (assist)
- 2010: Ventforet Kofu
- 2011: Guam
- 2012–2015: Shimizu S-Pulse (assist)
- 2015: Shimizu S-Pulse reserves
- 2016: Yinchuan Helanshan
- 2017–2018: Suzhou Dongwu

Kazuo Uchida (内田 一夫, Uchida Kazuo; born April 18, 1962) is a former Japanese football player and manager. He managed Guam national football team.

== Playing career ==
Uchida was born in Shizuoka on April 18, 1962. He started his career in football as a player for Shimizu Higashi High School where he won the National Sports Festival of Japan with them as well as coming runners-up in the All Japan High School Soccer Tournament in 1980. With these achievements he progressed his career at Komazawa University before he joined local football team Shimizu. While at Shimizu he continued his studies at University of Tokyo to become a coach in physical exercise.

== Coaching career ==
Uchida gained his first major coaching role at JEF United Ichihara on January 1, 1994, where he was the club's chief instructor. On December 31, 2003, he left the club and joined Vegalta Sendai where he initially started as deputy general manager. On March 1, 2004, he accepted an assistant coaching role for the Japan U-17 national team on a part-time basis. This lasted until 2007, when he left the Japanese team and concentrated on Vegalta Sendai where he moved to become their training director and then youth development director.

On January 1, 2010, Uchida became the manager of J2 League team Ventforet Kofu. At the end of the 2010 season he led the team to second within the division and promotion to the top tier.

On December 22, 2015, Uchida joined third tier Chinese club Yinchuan Helanshan for the start of the 2016 China League Two season.

== Managerial statistics ==
Team	From	To	Record				
Team	From	To	G	W	D	L	Win %
Ventforet Kofu	2010	2010	36	19	13	4	52.78
Total			36	19	13	4	52.78
