= Yinchuan Helanshan F.C. =

Chinese football club

Yinchuan Helanshan Yínchuān Hèlánshān 银川贺兰山
- Full name: Yinchuan Helanshan Football Club 银川贺兰山足球俱乐部
- Founded: 17 July 2013; 12 years ago
- Dissolved: 4 February 2020; 6 years ago
- Ground: Helan Mountain Stadium, Yinchuan
- Capacity: 39,872
- Owner: Yinchuan Sports Federation
- 2019: League Two, 10th
Home colours	Away colours

Yinchuan Helanshan Football Club was an association football club based in Yinchuan, Ningxia, China. The Helan Mountain Stadium was their home venue.

== History ==
Yinchuan Helanshan F.C. was established on 17 July 2013 by Yinchuan Sports Federation.

Yinchuan Helanshan F.C. was disqualified for 2020 China League Two on 4 February 2020 due to its failure to hand the salary and bonus confirmation form in time.

== Name changes ==
Year	Owner	Club name	Sponsored team name
2013–15	Yinchuan Sports Federation	Yinchuan Helanshan Football Club	Ningxia Qupper (宁夏杞动力)
2016	Yinchuan Sports Federation	Yinchuan Helanshan Football Club	Ningxia Mountain & Sea (宁夏山屿海)
2017–2018	Shenzhen Sea Elf Jewel Co. Ltd. (90%); Yinchuan Sports Federation (10%)	Yinchuan Helanshan Football Club	Ningxia Mountain & Sea (宁夏山屿海)
2019–	Yinchuan Sports Federation	Yinchuan Helanshan Football Club	Ningxia Fiery Phoenix (宁夏火凤凰)

== Coaching staff ==
Position	Staff
Head coach	(China) Zhao Changhong
Assistant coach	

Source: CFA

== Managerial history ==
- (Spain) Abraham García (2014)
- (China) Zhu Bo (2015)
- (Japan) Kazuo Uchida (2016)
- (China) Wang Haiming (2017)
- (China) Sun Wei (2017)
- (China) Fan Yuhong (2018)
- (China) Zhao Changhong (2019–2020)

== Results ==
All-time league rankings

As of the end of 2019 season.

Year	Div	Pld	W	D	L	GF	GA	GD	Pts	Pos.	FA Cup	Super Cup	AFC	Att./G	Stadium
2014	3	14	8	3	3	19	8	11	27^{1}	7	R1	DNQ	DNQ		Helan Mountain Stadium
2015	3	14	3	2	9	14	25	−11	11	7^{1}	R2	DNQ	DNQ	2,496	Helan Mountain Stadium
2016	3	20	12	6	2	32	13	19	42	5	R2	DNQ	DNQ	3,208	Helan Mountain Stadium
2017	3	27	15	6	6	40	22	18	51	3	R2	DNQ	DNQ	2,089	Helan Mountain Stadium
2018	3	28	16	7	5	49	24	25	55	9	R4	DNQ	DNQ	2,445	Helan Mountain Stadium
2019	3	30	18	7	5	57	27	30	61^{1}	10	R1	DNQ	DNQ		Helan Mountain Stadium

- ^1 In group stage.

Key

	China top division
	China second division
	China third division
W	Winners
RU	Runners-up
3	Third place
	Relegated

- Pld = Played
- W = Games won
- D = Games drawn
- L = Games lost
- F = Goals for
- A = Goals against
- Pts = Points
- Pos = Final position
- DNQ = Did not qualify
- DNE = Did not enter
- NH = Not Held
- – = Does Not Exist
- R1 = Round 1
- R2 = Round 2
- R3 = Round 3
- R4 = Round 4
- F = Final
- SF = Semi-finals
- QF = Quarter-finals
- R16 = Round of 16
- Group = Group stage
- GS2 = Second Group stage
- QR1 = First Qualifying Round
- QR2 = Second Qualifying Round
- QR3 = Third Qualifying Round
