= Bao'an Stadium =

Sports venue in Shenzhen, China

Coordinates: 22°33′40″N 113°52′35″E

- Bamboo Forest
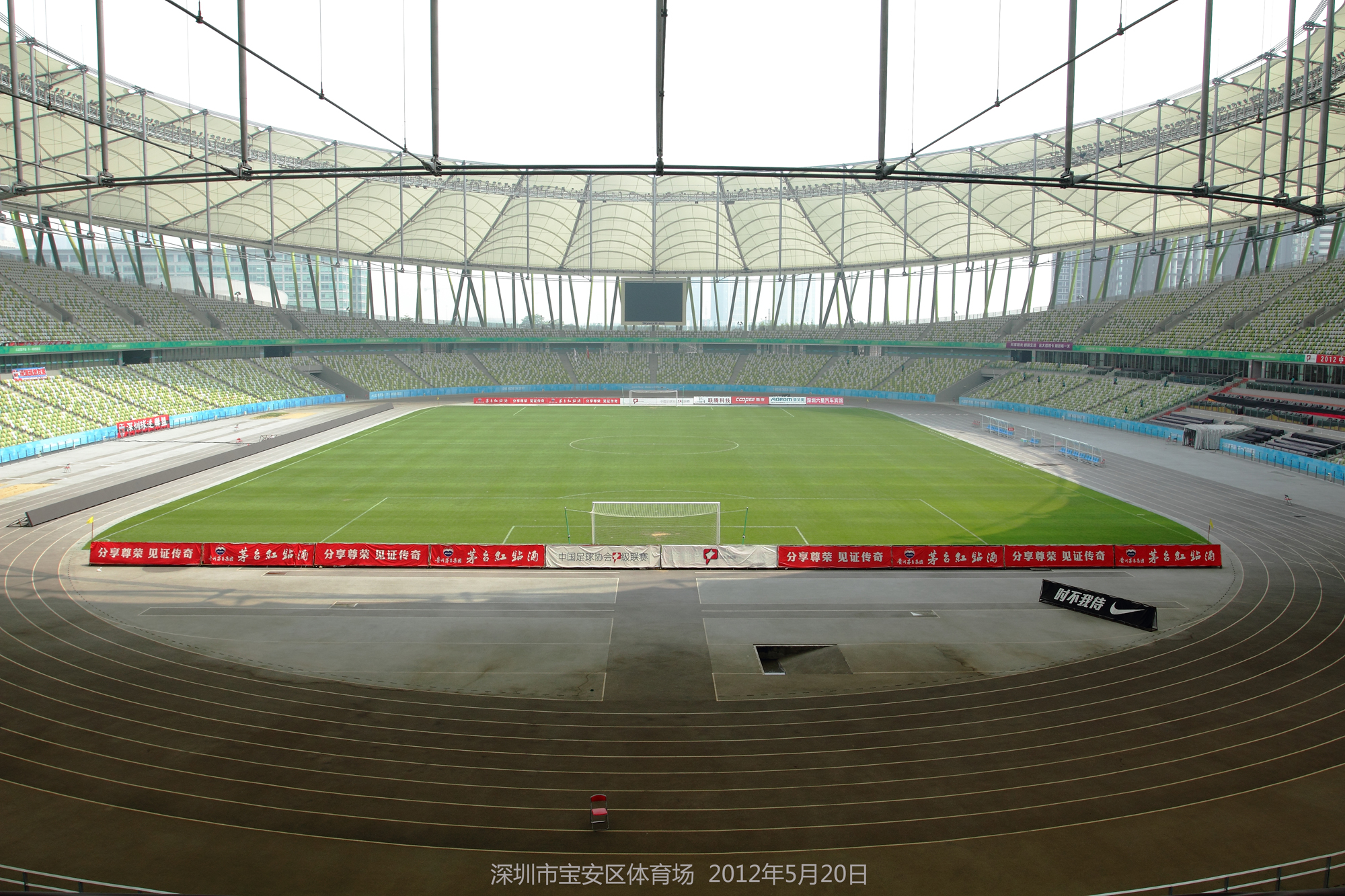
- Interactive map of Bao'an Stadium
- Location: Shenzhen, Guangdong, People's Republic of China
- Owner: Shenzhen Government
- Capacity: 44,050
- Surface: Grass
- Public transit: 1 at Bao'an Stadium

Construction
- Opened: 2011
- Architect: Gerkan, Marg and Partners

Tenants
- Shenzhen Ledman (2016−2018); Shenzhen (2023); Shenzhen Peng City (2024); Shenzhen Juniors (2025−)

Bao'an Stadium (simplified Chinese: 宝安体育馆; traditional Chinese: 寶安體育館; pinyin: Bǎo'ān Tǐyùguǎn; Jyutping: bou2 on1 tai2 juk6 gun2) is a multi-purpose stadium located in Bao'an District, Shenzhen, China. Built to host matches of the women's football tournament at the 2011 Summer Universiade, the stadium has a capacity of 44,050 spectators. It has a height of 40 meters.

The stadium features a cantilever membrane roof to cover the seating areas and a network of steel supports which surround the stadium exterior, inspired by the extensive bamboo forests of southern China.

The stadium is served by the nearby Bao'an Stadium Station on the Shenzhen Metro's Line 1.

== See also ==
- List of football stadiums in China
- List of stadiums in China
- Lists of stadiums
