= Ren Yongshun =

Chinese footballer (born 1985)

Ren Yongshun 任永顺
Personal information
- Full name: Ren Yongshun
- Date of birth: 8 April 1985 (age 41)
- Place of birth: Qingdao, Shandong, China
- Height: 1.86 m (6 ft 1 in)
- Position: Defender

Youth career
- 1999–2003: Shandong Luneng

Senior career*
Years	Team	Apps	(Gls)
2003–2006	Shandong Luneng	1	(0)
2007	Wuhan Guanggu	3	(0)
2008–2009	Jiangsu Sainty	24	(0)
2010–2011	Shandong Luneng	0	(0)
2012–2013	Qinghai Senke	1	(0)
Medal record
Representing China
Men's football
AFC Youth Championship
Silver medal – second place	2004 َ Malaysia	Team
- * Club domestic league appearances and goals

Ren Yongshun (simplified Chinese: 任永顺; traditional Chinese: 任永順; pinyin: Rén Yǒngshùn; born 8 April 1985) is a Chinese former football defender.

== Club career ==
=== Shandong Luneng ===
Ren Yongshun was the product of the Shandong Luneng youth system where he eventually graduated to the senior squad during the 2003 league season. He represented Shandong Luneng in the league for the first time as a starter on July 24, 2005 in a league match with Shanghai Shenhua in a 2-2 draw.

=== Wuhan Guangu ===
Unable to establish himself within the Shandong team he would transfer to Wuhan Guanggu at the beginning of the 2007 league season with fellow Shandong teammates Deng Xiaofei, Guo Mingyue and Li Zhuangfei. Taking time to establish himself within his new team Ren Yongshun eventually made his debut on August 26, 2007 against Shanghai Shenhua in a 0-0 draw. This was followed by several further league appearances, however the 2008 Chinese Super League season was to prove a difficult period for him as he quickly lost his place within the Wuhan team, this was added by Wuhan being ejected and subsequently relegated from the Chinese Super League after the club's management did not accept the punishment given to them by the Chinese Football Association after a scuffle broke out during a league game against Beijing Guoan on September 27, 2008.

=== Jiangsu Sainty ===
Without a football club to play in during the 2008 league season Ren Yongshun transferred to second tier football team Jiangsu Sainty and helped them fight for promotion to the Chinese Super League. Despite only playing half the season his first season would go on to be a success and he would make 12 league appearances as well as winning the division title with them. The following season saw his playing time drop when the club decided to bring in several players to help them stay within the top tier and this saw Ren spend much of the season on the substitute bench, only making a further 12 appearances in the whole season.

=== Return Shandong Luneng ===
Ren would go on to be released by Jiangsu Sainty at the end of the season and he would transfer back to Shandong Luneng at the beginning of 2010 league season.

== Honours ==
Jiangsu Sainty

- China League One: 2008
