= Helan Mountain Stadium =

Multi-purpose stadium in Ningxia, China

- Interactive map of Helan Mountain Stadium
- Full name: Helan Mountain Stadium
- Location: Yinchuan, Ningxia, China
- Coordinates: 38.497690°N 106.149004°E
- Capacity: 39,872

Construction
- Opened: 2013

Helan Mountain Stadium is a multi-purpose stadium in Ningxia, China. It is currently used mostly for football matches. The stadium holds 39,872 spectators. It opened in 2013.
