= Shenzhen Ledman F.C. =

Chinese football club

Shenzhen Ledman Shēnzhèn Léimàn 深圳雷曼
- Full name: Shenzhen Ledman Football Club 深圳人人雷曼足球俱乐部
- Founded: March 2015; 10 years ago
- Dissolved: 2018
- Ground: Bao'an Stadium, Shenzhen
- Capacity: 40,000
- 2018: League Two, 5th
| Home colours | Away colours |

Shenzhen Ledman Football Club is a defunct Chinese professional football club from the People's Republic of China. The club was based in Shenzhen, Guangdong Province.

== History ==
Shenzhen Renren Football Club was established in March 2015. They played in the 2015 China Amateur Football League finished the 3rd place and won promotion to 2016 China League Two. They changed their name to Shenzhen Ledman F.C. in December 2016.

Shenzhen Ledman officially disbanded after the 2018 league season.

== Name history ==
- 2015–2016: Shenzhen Renren F.C. 深圳人人
- 2017: Shenzhen Ledman F.C. 深圳雷曼人人
- 2017–2018: Shenzhen Ledman F.C. 深圳人人雷曼

== Managerial history ==
- (China) Zhang Jun (2015)
- (Cyprus) Siniša Gogić (January 2016 – June 2016)
- (China) Li Yuanping (caretaker) (June 2016 – September 2016)
- (China) Zhang Jun (December 2016 – October 2018)
- (China) Li Yuanping (caretaker) (October 2018 – present)

== Results ==
All-time league rankings

As of the end of 2018 season.

| Year | Div | Pld | W | D | L | GF | GA | GD | Pts | Pos. | FA Cup | Super Cup | AFC | Att./G | Stadium |
|---|---|---|---|---|---|---|---|---|---|---|---|---|---|---|---|
| 2015 | 4 | | | | | | | | | 3 | DNQ | DNQ | DNQ | | |
| 2016 | 3 | 20 | 7 | 5 | 8 | 21 | 16 | 5 | 26 | 11 | R1 | DNQ | DNQ | 2,554 | Bao'an Stadium |
| 2017 | 3 | 27 | 17 | 6 | 4 | 54 | 17 | 37 | 57 | 4 | R2 | DNQ | DNQ | 2,891 | Bao'an Stadium |
| 2018 | 3 | 28 | 11 | 10 | 7 | 33 | 28 | 5 | 43 | 5 | R2 | DNQ | DNQ | 615 | Bao'an Stadium |

Key

| | China top division |
| | China second division |
| | China third division |
| | China fourth division |
| W | Winners |
| RU | Runners-up |
| 3 | Third place |
| | Relegated |

- Pld = Played
- W = Games won
- D = Games drawn
- L = Games lost
- F = Goals for
- A = Goals against
- Pts = Points
- Pos = Final position
- DNQ = Did not qualify
- DNE = Did not enter
- NH = Not held
- – = Does not exist
- R1 = Round 1
- R2 = Round 2
- R3 = Round 3
- R4 = Round 4
- F = Final
- SF = Semi-finals
- QF = Quarter-finals
- R16 = Round of 16
- Group = Group stage
- GS2 = Second Group stage
- QR1 = First Qualifying Round
- QR2 = Second Qualifying Round
- QR3 = Third Qualifying Round
