= List of Chinese football transfers winter 2017 =

This is a list of Chinese football transfers for the 2017 season winter transfer window. Super League and League One transfer windows were opened on 1 January 2017 and closed on 28 February 2017. League Two transfer window was opened on 1 March 2017 and closed on 15 March 2017.

== Super League ==
=== Beijing Sinobo Guoan ===
In:

No.	Pos.	Nation	Player
3	DF	CHN	Yu Yang (from Guangzhou R&F)
9	FW	ESP	Jonathan Soriano (from (Austria) Red Bull Salzburg)
14	DF	CHN	Jin Pengxiang (loan return from Tianjin Quanjian)
15	FW	CHN	Zhu Chaoqing (loan return from Sichuan Longfor)
18	MF	CHN	Jin Taiyan (from Liaoning Whowin)
23	MF	CHN	Tang Shi (loan from Meizhou Kejia)
26	MF	CHN	Lü Peng (from Beijing BG)
28	DF	CHN	Jiang Tao (from Qingdao Huanghai)
29	MF	CHN	Ba Dun (loan return from Meizhou Kejia)
-	MF	CHN	Wang Hongyu (loan return from Beijing BIT)
-	MF	CHN	Zhong Jiyu (loan return from Beijing BIT)
-	MF	CHN	Tang Fan (loan return from Beijing BIT)
-	DF	CHN	Li Bowen (loan return from Meizhou Kejia)

Out:

No.	Pos.	Nation	Player
1	GK	CHN	Zhao Shi (to Qingdao Huanghai)
4	DF	CHN	Zhou Ting (to Dalian Yifang)
13	DF	CHN	Xu Yunlong (Retired)
15	FW	UZB	Igor Sergeev (loan return to (Uzbekistan) Pakhtakor Tashkent)
18	DF	CHN	Lang Zheng (to Hebei China Fortune)
23	MF	CHN	Yang Yun (to Beijing BG)
26	FW	CHN	Shan Huanhuan (Released)
28	MF	CHN	Zhang Chengdong (to Hebei China Fortune)
49	MF	CHN	Wang Hongyu (loan to Beijing BIT)
54	MF	CHN	Zhong Jiyu (loan to Beijing BIT)
57	MF	CHN	Tang Fan (to Beijing BIT)
56	DF	CHN	Sheng Pengfei (loan to Dalian Boyoung)
61	DF	CHN	Wang Haitao (loan return to Beijing BG)
-	DF	CHN	Li Bowen (loan to Beijing BIT)

=== Changchun Yatai ===
In:

No.	Pos.	Nation	Player
4	DF	CHN	Yu Rui (from Beijing Renhe)
7	MF	BRA	Marinho (from (Brazil) Vitória)
9	FW	NGA	Odion Ighalo (from (England) Watford)
10	MF	HUN	Szabolcs Huszti (from (Germany) Eintracht Frankfurt)
18	MF	CHN	Guo Liang (from Qingdao Jonoon)
27	MF	CHN	Zhang Li (from Henan Jianye)
29	FW	CHN	Tan Long (from (United States) Phoenix Rising)
49	MF	CHN	He Wei (from Hebei Elite)
-	DF	CHN	Li Xiaoting (loan return from Shenzhen Renren)
-	MF	CHN	Zhu Yifan (loan return from Jiangxi Liansheng)
-	GK	CHN	Mi Tianhe (loan return from Baoding Yingli ETS)
-	FW	CHN	Liu Xiaodong (loan return from Baoding Yingli ETS)

Out:

No.	Pos.	Nation	Player
4	MF	CRO	Darko Matić (Retired)
6	MF	FRA	Julien Gorius (Released)
10	FW	BOL	Marcelo Moreno (to Wuhan Zall)
11	MF	CHN	Yang He (loan to Hebei Elite)
14	DF	CHN	Shao Shuai (loan to Hebei Elite)
29	GK	CHN	Song Zhenyu (to Shaanxi Chang'an Athletic)
30	DF	CHN	Yang Boyu (loan return to Shanghai SIPG)
35	MF	CRO	Mislav Oršić (to (South Korea) Ulsan Hyundai)
-	DF	CHN	Li Xiaoting (loan to Heilongjiang Lava Spring)
-	MF	CHN	Zhu Yifan (loan to Hebei Elite)
-	GK	CHN	Mi Tianhe (to Baoding Yingli ETS)
-	FW	CHN	Liu Xiaodong (to Baoding Yingli ETS)

=== Chongqing Dangdai Lifan ===
In:

No.	Pos.	Nation	Player
4	DF	CHN	Zheng Tao (from Liaoning Whowin)
10	MF	CHN	Peng Xinli (from Guangzhou Evergrande)
14	FW	BRA	Hyuri (loan from (Brazil) Atlético Mineiro)
19	DF	CHN	Liu Huan (from Dalian Transcendence)
26	DF	CHN	Yuan Mincheng (from Nantong Zhiyun)
28	MF	CHN	Yao Daogang (loan from (Portugal) Gondomar)
29	MF	CHN	Yang Ke (from Hunan Billows)
33	MF	CHN	Nan Song (loan from (South Korea) Bucheon FC)
36	MF	CHN	Xu Xu (loan from (Spain) Granada)
45	MF	CHN	Gong Haolun (from Jiangsu Suning)
47	DF	CHN	Chen Kejiang (from Shanghai SIPG)
48	DF	CHN	Liao Junjie (from Shanghai SIPG)
-	MF	CHN	Peng Rui (loan return from Chengdu Qianbao)
-	FW	COL	Adrián Ramos (from (Germany) Borussia Dortmund)

Out:

No.	Pos.	Nation	Player
3	DF	CHN	Yang Yun (to Qingdao Huanghai)
4	DF	CHN	Luo Qin (to Beijing Renhe)
6	MF	CHN	Wang Dong (to Tianjin Teda)
13	MF	CHN	Zheng Yi (to Suzhou Dongwu)
21	MF	CHN	Xu Xiaobo (Released)
25	MF	CHN	Peng Xinli (loan return to Guangzhou Evergrande)
28	DF	CHN	Fan Peipei (to Dalian Transcendence)
30	DF	CHN	Tan Wangsong (to Tianjin Teda)
33	FW	ARG	Emanuel Gigliotti (to (Argentina) Independiente)
54	GK	CHN	Wang Shuo (to Qingdao Huanghai)
-	MF	CHN	Peng Rui (to Chengdu Qianbao)
-	FW	COL	Adrián Ramos (loan to (Spain) Granada)

=== Guangzhou Evergrande Taobao ===
In:

No.	Pos.	Nation	Player
21	DF	CHN	Zhang Chenglin (from Beijing Renhe)
23	DF	KOR	Kim Hyung-il (from (South Korea) Jeonbuk Hyundai Motors)
24	MF	CHN	Wang Junhui (loan return from Wuhan Zall)
26	FW	CHN	Wang Jingbin (loan return from (Japan) Fagiano Okayama)
42	MF	CHN	Wang Rui (loan return from Wuhan Zall)
48	MF	CHN	Zheng Jie (loan return from Lijiang Jiayunhao)
51	GK	CHN	Liu Weiguo (loan return from Liaoning Whowin)
-	FW	CHN	Yang Chaosheng (loan return from Wuhan Zall)
-	DF	CHN	Hu Bowen (loan return from Shenyang Urban)
-	MF	CHN	Li Yuanyi (loan return from Tianjin Teda)
-	FW	CHN	Liang Xueming (loan return from Guizhou Zhicheng)
-	DF	CHN	Liu Hao (loan return from Guizhou Zhicheng)
-	MF	CHN	Zhang Jiaqi (loan return from Qingdao Huanghai)
-	DF	CHN	Gong Liangxuan (loan return from Sichuan Longfor)
-	DF	CHN	Yi Teng (loan return from Beijing Renhe)
-	MF	CHN	Peng Xinli (loan return from Chongqing Lifan)
-	MF	CHN	Shewket Yalqun (loan return from Xinjiang Tianshan Leopard)

Out:

No.	Pos.	Nation	Player
1	GK	CHN	Dong Chunyu (to Beijing BG)
18	MF	CHN	Li Yuanyi (to Tianjin Teda)
23	DF	CHN	Han Pengfei (loan to Guizhou Zhicheng)
24	FW	CHN	Liang Xueming (to Guizhou Zhicheng)
36	DF	CHN	Hu Ruibao (to (Denmark) Vejle Boldklub)
38	MF	CHN	Ju Feng (loan to (Japan) Ehime FC)
44	DF	CHN	Liu Hao (loan to Guizhou Zhicheng)
49	MF	CHN	Tan Jiajun (to Meizhou Kejia)
56	MF	CHN	Guo Jing (loan to Meizhou Kejia)
60	MF	CHN	Zhang Jiaqi (loan to Shenzhen FC)
63	DF	CHN	Liu Haidong (loan to Heilongjiang Lava Spring)
-	DF	CHN	Gong Liangxuan (loan to Chengdu Qianbao)
-	DF	CHN	Yi Teng (to Guangzhou R&F)
-	MF	CHN	Peng Xinli (to Chongqing Lifan)
-	MF	CHN	Shewket Yalqun (loan to Xinjiang Tianshan Leopard)

=== Guangzhou R&F ===
In:

No.	Pos.	Nation	Player
3	FW	CHN	Xiang Baixu (from Tianjin Quanjian)
4	MF	CHN	Zhang Gong (from Dalian Transcendence)
8	MF	BRA	Júnior Urso (from Shandong Luneng)
18	DF	CHN	Yi Teng (from Guangzhou Evergrande)
19	DF	CHN	Jiang Jihong (from Shijiazhuang Ever Bright)
31	DF	CHN	Liang Zhanhao (loan return from Hong Kong R&F)
35	MF	CHN	Li Tixiang (from Shijiazhuang Ever Bright)
37	MF	CHN	Li Yuyang (loan return from Hong Kong R&F)
41	DF	CHN	Li Lei (loan return from Hong Kong R&F)
43	DF	CHN	Ye Ruiwen (loan return from Hong Kong R&F)
53	DF	CHN	Bi Guanghuan (loan return from Hong Kong R&F)
60	DF	CHN	Zhao Ming (from Yanbian Funde)
-	FW	CHN	Mai Jiajian (from Shanghai Shenxin)
-	DF	CHN	Yang Ting (loan return from Hong Kong R&F)
-	FW	CHN	Min Junlin (loan return from Hong Kong R&F)
-	FW	CHN	Zhang Yuan (loan return from Beijing Renhe)
-	FW	COD	Jeremy Bokila (loan return from (Qatar) Al Kharaitiyat)

Out:

No.	Pos.	Nation	Player
3	DF	CHN	Yu Yang (to Beijing Guoan)
5	DF	CHN	Zhang Yaokun (to Wuhan Zall)
6	DF	CHN	Yang Ting (loan to Guizhou Zhicheng)
7	MF	SWE	Gustav Svensson (to (United States) Seattle Sounders FC)
8	MF	CHN	Wang Xiaolong (to Tianjin Quanjian)
15	MF	CHN	Ning An (loan to Hong Kong R&F)
18	GK	CHN	Zhang Shichang (to Sichuan Longfor)
21	FW	CHN	Chang Feiya (loan to Guizhou Zhicheng)
30	DF	CHN	Fu Yunlong (loan to Hong Kong R&F)
33	MF	CHN	Wang Song (to Jiangsu Suning)
35	FW	CHN	Min Junlin (loan to Guizhou Zhicheng)
51	MF	CHN	Zhu Di (loan to Hong Kong R&F)
52	MF	CHN	Huang Haoxuan (loan to Hong Kong R&F)
55	DF	CHN	Tu Dongxu (loan to Hong Kong R&F)
62	FW	CHN	Mai Jiajian (loan return to Shanghai Shenxin)
75	DF	CHN	Wang Erduo (loan to Hong Kong R&F)
-	FW	CHN	Mai Jiajian (loan to Hong Kong R&F)
-	FW	CHN	Zhang Yuan (to Shenzhen F.C.)
-	FW	COD	Jeremy Bokila (to (Turkey) Akhisar Belediyespor)
-	FW	NGA	Aaron Olanare (to (Russia) CSKA Moscow)

=== Guizhou Hengfeng Zhicheng ===
In:

No.	Pos.	Nation	Player
4	DF	CHN	Yang Ting (loan from Guangzhou R&F)
6	MF	CHN	Fan Yunlong (from Beijing Renhe)
8	MF	EGY	Ali Ghazal (from (Portugal) Nacional)
9	FW	KEN	Michael Olunga (from (Sweden) Djurgårdens IF)
10	MF	NED	Tjaronn Chery (from (England) Queens Park Rangers)
11	FW	CRO	Nikica Jelavić (loan from Beijing Renhe)
18	FW	CHN	Min Junlin (loan from Guangzhou R&F)
19	FW	CHN	Chang Feiya (loan from Guangzhou R&F)
22	FW	CHN	Liang Xueming (from Guangzhou Evergrande)
23	DF	CHN	Han Pengfei (loan from Guangzhou Evergrande)
27	DF	AUS	Ryan McGowan (from Henan Jianye)
29	DF	CHN	Liu Hao (loan from Guangzhou Evergrande)
30	DF	CHN	Leng Shiao (loan from Shanghai Shenhua)

Out:

No.	Pos.	Nation	Player
6	MF	CHN	Liu Teng (Released)
9	DF	CMR	Yves Ekwalla Herman (to Xinjiang Tianshan Leopard)
10	FW	BRA	Mazola (to (South Korea) Jeonbuk Hyundai Motors)
19	MF	CHN	Du Shaobin (Released)
20	MF	CHN	Wang Yongxin (Released)
22	FW	CHN	Liang Xueming (loan return to Guangzhou Evergrande)
23	DF	ESP	Ibán Cuadrado (Released)
26	DF	CHN	Liu Hao (loan return to Guangzhou Evergrande)
29	FW	CHN	Lian Chen (to Hebei Elite)
31	MF	CHN	Fan Yunlong (loan return to Beijing Renhe)

=== Hebei China Fortune ===
In:

No.	Pos.	Nation	Player
2	DF	CHN	Zhao Mingjian (from Shandong Luneng)
3	DF	CHN	Zhao Yuhao (from Hangzhou Greentown)
10	MF	BRA	Hernanes (from (Italy) Juventus)
14	DF	KOR	Kim Ju-young (from Shanghai SIPG)
15	MF	CHN	Yin Hongbo (from Henan Jianye)
23	DF	CHN	Ren Hang (from Jiangsu Suning)
28	MF	CHN	Zhang Chengdong (from Beijing Guoan)
31	FW	CHN	Xu Tianyuan (from (Spain) Rayo Vallecano)
33	DF	CHN	Gao Zhunyi (from Shandong Luneng)
41	GK	CHN	Geng Xiaofeng (from Shanghai Shenhua)
53	MF	CHN	Han Sipei (Free agent)
55	MF	CHN	Xu Jiajun (loan return from Shenyang Urban)
-	DF	CHN	Lang Zheng (from Beijing Guoan)

Out:

No.	Pos.	Nation	Player
3	MF	CHN	Zhang Yin (to Jiangsu Yancheng Dingli)
15	MF	CHN	Wang Quan (to Hunan Billows)
21	MF	FRA	Gaël Kakuta (loan to (Spain) Deportivo La Coruña)
22	DF	TUR	Ersan Gülüm (loan to (Turkey) Beşiktaş)
23	DF	CHN	Xu Xiaolong (loan to Shanghai Shenxin)
24	DF	CHN	Yang Wenji (to Meizhou Hakka)
28	MF	CHN	Geng Jiaqi (Released)
33	DF	CHN	Gao Zhunyi (loan return to Shandong Luneng)
35	GK	CHN	Zhou Yuchen (loan return to Shandong Luneng)
43	DF	CHN	Otkur Hasan (to Dalian Transcendence)
57	FW	CHN	Gao Yunfei (Released)
60	MF	CHN	Sang Yifei (to Liaoning Whowin)
-	DF	CHN	Lang Zheng (loan to Liaoning Whowin)

=== Henan Jianye ===
In:

No.	Pos.	Nation	Player
1	GK	CHN	Wen Zhixiang (from Jiangxi Liansheng)
3	DF	SYR	Ahmad Al Salih (from (Kuwait) Al-Arabi)
7	FW	CHN	Hu Jinghang (loan from Shanghai SIPG)
8	MF	CZE	Bořek Dočkal (from (Czech Republic) Sparta Prague)
10	FW	CMR	Christian Bassogog (from (Denmark) AaB)
11	DF	CHN	Ke Zhao (from Wuhan Zall)
14	MF	CHN	Feng Gang (loan from Hangzhou Greentown)
18	FW	CHN	Yang Changpeng (from Yinchuan Helanshan)
24	MF	CHN	Liu Heng (from Hangzhou Greentown)
39	FW	CHN	Chen Zijie (from Hunan Billows)

Out:

No.	Pos.	Nation	Player
3	DF	CHN	Li Xiaoming (loan return to Shanghai Shenhua)
7	DF	SVN	Miral Samardžić (to (Turkey) Akhisar Belediyespor)
8	MF	CHN	Yin Hongbo (to Hebei China Fortune)
11	MF	CHN	Mou Shantao (to Nei Mongol Zhongyou)
10	MF	BRA	Ivo (to Beijing Renhe)
14	DF	CHN	Mirahmetjan Muzepper (to Tianjin Teda)
15	DF	AUS	Ryan McGowan (to Guizhou Zhicheng)
18	MF	CHN	Liang Yu (to Shenzhen)
20	FW	SWE	Osman Sow (loan to (United Arab Emirates) Emirates Club)
24	FW	CHN	Zhang Shuai (Released)
29	FW	CHN	Han Jiabao (to Shenzhen Ledman)
59	MF	CHN	Zhang Li (to Changchun Yatai)

=== Jiangsu Suning ===
In:

No.	Pos.	Nation	Player
16	MF	CHN	Gao Tianyi (from Shenzhen)
19	DF	CHN	Huang Jiajun (loan from (Portugal) Oriental Dragon)
21	DF	CHN	Cao Haiqing (from Hangzhou Greentown)
31	FW	CHN	Gao Di (loan from Shanghai Shenhua)
33	MF	CHN	Wang Song (from Guangzhou R&F)
39	DF	CHN	Yang Boyu (from Shanghai SIPG)
42	DF	CHN	Li Shizhou (loan return from Shenyang Urban)
50	DF	CHN	Zhong Yi (from (Portugal) Atlético CP)
59	MF	CHN	Nan Xiaoheng (from Xinjiang Tianshan Leopard)
-	FW	CHN	Qu Cheng (loan return from Sichuan Longfor)
-	FW	CHN	Zhang Wei (loan return from Chengdu Qianbao)
-	MF	CRO	Sammir (loan return from Hangzhou Greentown)

Out:

No.	Pos.	Nation	Player
6	DF	AUS	Trent Sainsbury (loan to (Italy) Inter Milan)
9	FW	BRA	Jô (to (Brazil) Corinthians)
14	FW	CHN	Qu Cheng (to Sichuan Longfor)
15	MF	CHN	Cao Kang (loan to Heilongjiang Lava Spring)
16	MF	CRO	Sammir (to (Croatia) Dinamo Zagreb)
18	FW	CHN	Zhang Wei (to Nantong Zhiyun)
19	MF	CHN	Yang Hao (Released)
21	MF	CHN	Li Zhichao (to Wuhan Zall)
23	DF	CHN	Ren Hang (to Hebei China Fortune)
44	FW	CHN	Zhang Jiabei (to Zhenjiang Huasa)
47	DF	CHN	Hong Xiao (Released)
50	DF	CHN	Zhong Yi (loan return to (Portugal) Atlético CP)
59	DF	CHN	Yang Ailong (loan return to (Portugal) Oriental Dragon)
61	DF	CHN	Liu Junshuai (loan return to (Portugal) Torreense)
62	MF	CHN	Gong Haolun (to Chongqing Lifan)

=== Liaoning FC ===
In:

No.	Pos.	Nation	Player
5	DF	CHN	Lang Zheng (loan from Hebei China Fortune)
10	MF	CHN	Sang Yifei (from Hebei China Fortune)
18	FW	CHN	Yang Xu (loan from Shandong Luneng)
23	FW	AUS	Robbie Kruse (from (Germany) Bayer Leverkusen)
24	MF	AUS	James Holland (from (Australia) Adelaide United)
27	MF	CHN	Li Jiahe (from Zhejiang Yiteng)
30	DF	CHN	Lü Wei (from Tianjin Teda)
33	FW	CHN	Sun Zhaoliang (from (Portugal) Oriental Dragon)
35	MF	CHN	Xiong Zhenfeng (from Shanghai Shenhua)
41	MF	CHN	Bu Nan (Free agent)
54	GK	CHN	Huang Hongbo (loan return from Shenyang Urban)
58	DF	CHN	Chi Zhe'nan (Free agent)
-	FW	CIV	Franck Boli (loan return from (Norway) Aalesund)

Out:

No.	Pos.	Nation	Player
1	GK	CHN	Liu Weiguo (loan return to Guangzhou Evergrande)
4	MF	CHN	Sun Shilin (to Shanghai Shenhua)
5	DF	CHN	Yang Shanping (to Tianjin Quanjian)
9	MF	CHN	Zhao Junzhe (Retired)
11	DF	CHN	Zheng Tao (to Chongqing Lifan)
13	MF	AUS	Dario Vidošić (to (South Korea) Seongnam FC)
16	DF	CHN	Zhang Tianlong (loan to Nei Mongol Zhongyou)
19	MF	CHN	Zhang Jingyang (to Sichuan Longfor)
20	MF	CHN	Jin Taiyan (to Beijing Guoan)
22	MF	CHN	Wang Liang (Retired)
30	FW	SEN	Ibrahima Toure (Released)
32	FW	CHN	Lei Yongchi (to Tianjin Teda)
33	DF	AUS	Michael Thwaite (Released)
48	MF	CHN	Fei Da (Released)
-	FW	CIV	Franck Boli (to (Norway) Stabæk)

=== Shandong Luneng Taishan ===
In:

No.	Pos.	Nation	Player
3	DF	CHN	Liu Junshuai (from (Portugal) Torreense)
16	MF	CHN	Zhou Haibin (from Tianjin Teda)
28	GK	CHN	Zhou Yuchen (loan return from Hebei China Fortune)
39	DF	CHN	Jiang Jiajun (from Shanghai Shenxin)
-	DF	CHN	Gao Zhunyi (loan return from Hebei China Fortune)
-	MF	BRA	Júnior Urso (loan return from (Brazil) Atlético Mineiro)

Out:

No.	Pos.	Nation	Player
2	DF	CHN	Zhao Mingjian (to Hebei China Fortune)
6	MF	BRA	Jucilei (loan to (Brazil) São Paulo)
8	MF	CHN	Wang Yongpo (to Tianjin Quanjian)
10	MF	ARG	Walter Montillo (to (Brazil) Botafogo)
19	FW	CHN	Yang Xu (loan to Liaoning Whowin)
36	DF	CHN	Yao Junsheng (loan to Meizhou Kejia)
53	MF	CHN	Zhang Hao (to Shijiazhuang Ever Bright)
56	MF	CHN	Jiang Chenghao (to Shenzhen)
58	MF	CHN	Yu Songhai (to Tianjin Quanjian)
60	MF	CHN	Zhang Chen (loan to Shenzhen)
-	DF	CHN	Wang Youle (to Shenzhen)
-	DF	CHN	Sun Xiaobin (to Shenzhen)
-	MF	CHN	Dai Chunlei (to Shenzhen)
-	MF	CHN	Xie Mingqi (to Shenzhen)
-	MF	CHN	Zhou Shengzhi (to Shijiazhuang Ever Bright)
-	MF	CHN	Zhang Yuanshu (loan to (Brazil) São Paulo)
-	DF	CHN	Gao Zhunyi (to Hebei China Fortune)
-	MF	BRA	Júnior Urso (to Guangzhou R&F)

=== Shanghai Greenland Shenhua ===
In:

No.	Pos.	Nation	Player
6	DF	CHN	Li Peng (from Qingdao Jonoon)
7	FW	CHN	Mao Jianqing (from Shijiazhuang Ever Bright)
15	FW	CHN	Zhu Jianrong (from Qingdao Jonoon)
31	MF	CHN	Wang Wei (from Qingdao Jonoon)
32	FW	ARG	Carlos Tevez (from (Argentina) Boca Juniors)
35	MF	CHN	Lü Pin (loan return from (Spain) Atlético Saguntino)
37	MF	CHN	Sun Shilin (from Liaoning Whowin)
41	DF	CHN	Cheng Rui (from Dalian Yifang)
46	MF	CHN	Pan Weihao (loan return from Qingdao Huanghai)
51	DF	HKG	Brian Fok (loan return from (Azerbaijan) AZAL PFK)
57	DF	CHN	Sun Kai (from Shanghai Shenxin)
-	FW	CHN	Gao Shipeng (loan return from (Spain) Eldense)
-	GK	CHN	Bai Shuo (loan return from Shanghai JuJu Sports)
-	DF	CHN	Huang Bowen (loan return from Wuhan Zall)
-	MF	CHN	Li Lianxiang (loan return from Shanghai JuJu Sports)
-	MF	CHN	Yang Haofeng (loan return from Shanghai JuJu Sports)
-	DF	CHN	Li Xiaoming (loan return from Henan Jianye)
-	DF	CHN	Deng Biao (loan return from (Spain) Atlético Saguntino)
-	DF	CHN	Leng Shiao (loan return from Qingdao Huanghai)
-	DF	CHN	Xu Yougang (loan return from Qingdao Huanghai)
-	FW	CHN	Zhou Jiahao (loan return from (Spain) Eldense)
-	FW	CHN	Wu Changqi (loan return from (Spain) La Roda)
-	DF	ZAM	Stoppila Sunzu (loan return from (France) Lille)
-	MF	PAR	Óscar Romero (from (Argentina) Racing)
-	FW	BRA	Paulo Henrique (loan return from (Portugal) Estoril)

Out:

No.	Pos.	Nation	Player
1	GK	CHN	Geng Xiaofeng (to Hebei China Fortune)
6	DF	CHN	Li Wenbo (to Hebei Elite)
9	FW	SEN	Demba Ba (loan to (Turkey) Beşiktaş)
18	FW	CHN	Gao Di (loan to Jiangsu Suning)
19	DF	CHN	Zheng Kaimu (loan to Shijiazhuang Ever Bright)
24	MF	CHN	Deng Zhuoxiang (loan to Qingdao Huanghai)
35	FW	CHN	Gao Shipeng (loan to Shanghai JuJu Sports)
36	MF	CHN	Xu Jun (loan to Shanghai JuJu Sports)
37	DF	CHN	Cao Chuanyu (loan to Shanghai JuJu Sports)
42	DF	CHN	Luo Xi (to Meizhou Kejia)
44	FW	CHN	Yuan Yisheng (Released)
49	DF	CHN	Shan Haiyang (to Zhejiang Yiteng)
50	MF	CHN	Yang Chengyun (to Qingdao Huanghai)
51	MF	CHN	Zhan Yilin (loan to Shanghai JuJu Sports)
57	MF	CHN	Wang Fei (loan to Shanghai JuJu Sports)
58	MF	CHN	Xiong Zhenfeng (to Liaoning Whowin)
64	DF	CHN	Gong Jinshuai (loan to Shanghai Sunfun)
65	MF	CHN	Yan Xinyu (loan to Shanghai JuJu Sports)
69	MF	CHN	Zu Pengchao (to Shenzhen)
-	GK	CHN	Bai Shuo (to Shanghai JuJu Sports)
-	DF	CHN	Huang Bowen (to Wuhan Zall)
-	MF	CHN	Li Lianxiang (to Shanghai JuJu Sports)
-	MF	CHN	Yang Haofeng (to Shanghai JuJu Sports)
-	DF	CHN	Li Xiaoming (loan to Shenzhen)
-	DF	CHN	Deng Biao (loan to Shanghai JuJu Sports)
-	DF	CHN	Leng Shiao (loan to Guizhou Zhicheng)
-	DF	CHN	Xu Yougang (loan to Qingdao Huanghai)
-	FW	CHN	Zhou Jiahao (loan to Shanghai JuJu Sports)
-	FW	CHN	Wu Changqi (loan to Shanghai Sunfun)
-	DF	ZAM	Stoppila Sunzu (loan to (Russia) Arsenal Tula)
-	MF	PAR	Óscar Romero (loan to (Spain) Deportivo Alavés)
-	FW	BRA	Paulo Henrique (loan to (Brazil) Sport Recife)
-	GK	CHN	Wang Binran (to Jiangxi Liansheng)

=== Shanghai SIPG ===
In:

No.	Pos.	Nation	Player
8	MF	BRA	Oscar (from (England) Chelsea)
16	DF	POR	Ricardo Carvalho (Free agent)
19	MF	CHN	Jia Tianzi (from Shanghai Shenxin)
25	MF	UZB	Odil Ahmedov (from (Russia) FC Krasnodar)
33	MF	CHN	Wei Shihao (loan from (Portugal) Leixões)
-	MF	CHN	Wu Hang (from Baotou Nanjiao)
-	FW	CHN	Zhu Zhengrong (loan return from Meizhou Kejia)
-	MF	CHN	Zhu Zhengyu (loan return from (Serbia) BSK Borča)
-	DF	CHN	Yang Boyu (loan return from Changchun Yatai)
-	DF	CHN	Wu Haitian (loan return from Shanghai JuJu Sports)
-	FW	CHN	Li Jiawei (loan return from Nantong Zhiyun)

Out:

No.	Pos.	Nation	Player
10	MF	ARG	Darío Conca (loan to (Brazil) Flamengo)
12	FW	CHN	Li Haowen (loan to Suzhou Dongwu)
13	FW	CHN	Zhu Zhengrong (loan to Suzhou Dongwu)
14	DF	KOR	Kim Ju-young (to Hebei China Fortune)
17	FW	CIV	Jean Evrard Kouassi (to Wuhan Zall)
19	DF	CHN	Yang Shiyuan (loan to Yanbian Funde)
25	MF	CHN	Zhu Zhengyu (loan to Nei Mongol Zhongyou)
26	FW	CHN	Hu Jinghang (loan to Henan Jianye)
31	MF	CHN	Sun Jungang (loan to (Japan) Giravanz Kitakyushu)
32	DF	CHN	Sun Xiang (Released)
33	DF	CHN	Yang Boyu (to Jiangsu Suning)
41	DF	CHN	Chen Kejiang (to Chongqing Lifan)
45	DF	CHN	Chen Fujun (to Shenzhen)
-	DF	CHN	Zhang Jinxin (to Shenzhen)
-	DF	CHN	Liao Junjie (to Chongqing Lifan)
-	DF	CHN	Wu Haitian (to Hunan Billows)
-	FW	CHN	Li Jiawei (to Nantong Zhiyun)

=== Tianjin Quanjian ===
In:

No.	Pos.	Nation	Player
5	DF	CHN	Yang Shanping (from Liaoning FC)
9	FW	BRA	Júnior Moraes (loan from (Ukraine) Dynamo Kyiv)
10	FW	BRA	Alexandre Pato (from (Spain) Villarreal)
19	MF	CHN	Wang Xiaolong (from Guangzhou R&F)
21	MF	KOR	Kwon Kyung-won (from (United Arab Emirates) Al-Ahli)
25	DF	CHN	Mi Haolun (from Shijiazhuang Ever Bright)
28	MF	BEL	Axel Witsel (from (Russia) Zenit Saint Petersburg)
39	MF	CHN	Wang Yongpo (from Shandong Luneng)
48	MF	CHN	Yu Songhai (from Shandong Luneng)
49	GK	CHN	Sun Qibin (from Tianjin Huochetou)
-	DF	CHN	Fang Wensheng (loan return from Jiangsu Yancheng Dingli)
-	MF	CHN	Yang Wanshun (loan return from Jiangsu Yancheng Dingli)
-	MF	CHN	Li Chao (loan return from Jiangsu Yancheng Dingli)
-	DF	CHN	Cao Xiaodong (loan return from Jiangsu Yancheng Dingli)

Out:

No.	Pos.	Nation	Player
9	FW	BRA	Luís Fabiano (to (Brazil) Vasco da Gama)
10	MF	BRA	Jádson (to (Brazil) Corinthians)
15	DF	CHN	Jin Pengxiang (loan return to Beijing Guoan)
17	GK	CHN	Shi Meng (Retired)
18	FW	CHN	Xiang Baixu (to Guangzhou R&F)
23	MF	CHN	Wan Cheng (to Yinchuan Helanshan)
25	DF	HKG	Ng Wai Chiu (to (Hong Kong) Eastern)
26	MF	CHN	Xia Ningning (to Shanghai Shenxin)
28	DF	CHN	Dong Shaochen (to Zhenjiang Huasa)
29	DF	CHN	Zhang Wei (to Yanbian Funde)
30	FW	CHN	Zhang Shuo (loan to Jiangsu Yancheng Dingli)
54	FW	CHN	Yu Yang (Retired)
-	DF	CHN	Fang Wensheng (to Jiangsu Yancheng Dingli)
-	MF	CHN	Yang Wanshun (to Jiangsu Yancheng Dingli)
-	MF	CHN	Li Chao (to Jiangsu Yancheng Dingli)
-	DF	CHN	Cao Xiaodong (to Hangzhou Greentown)

=== Tianjin Teda ===
In:

No.	Pos.	Nation	Player
2	DF	CHN	Huang Chuang (loan from (Portugal) Gondomar)
5	DF	CHN	Qiu Tianyi (from Wuhan Zall)
6	MF	CHN	Wang Dong (from Chongqing Lifan)
10	MF	NGA	John Obi Mikel (from (England) Chelsea)
11	MF	CHN	Li Yuanyi (from Guangzhou Evergrande)
14	DF	KOR	Hwang Seok-ho (from (Japan) Kashima Antlers)
18	FW	CHN	Zhou Liao (loan return from Wuhan Zall)
20	DF	CHN	Yang Liyu (loan from (Portugal) Gondomar)
25	DF	CHN	Mirahmetjan Muzepper (from Henan Jianye)
27	MF	SRB	Nemanja Gudelj (from (Netherlands) Ajax)
28	DF	CHN	Tan Wangsong (from Chongqing Lifan)
30	GK	CHN	Li Zheng (loan from (Portugal) Gondomar)
32	FW	CHN	Lei Yongchi (from Liaoning Whowin)
39	FW	NGA	Brown Ideye (from (Greece) Olympiacos)
41	GK	CHN	Teng Shangkun (from Qingdao Huanghai)
-	MF	CHN	Song Qi (loan return from Tianjin Huochetou)
-	FW	CHN	Fan Zhiqiang (loan return from Jiangxi Liansheng)
-	MF	CHN	Wang Guanyi (loan return from Tianjin Huochetou)
-	FW	CHN	Du Junpeng (loan return from Baoding Yingli ETS)

Out:

No.	Pos.	Nation	Player
1	GK	CHN	Zong Lei (Retired)
2	DF	CHN	Yang Zexiang (loan to Baoding Yingli ETS)
3	DF	MOZ	Zainadine Júnior (loan to (Portugal) Marítimo)
5	DF	AUS	Aleksandar Jovanović (to (South Korea) Jeju United)
6	MF	CHN	Zhou Haibin (to Shandong Luneng)
7	MF	CHN	Li Benjian (Released)
10	FW	COL	Fredy Montero (loan to (United States) Vancouver Whitecaps FC)
11	MF	BRA	Wagner (to (Brazil) Vasco da Gama)
25	DF	CHN	Yuan Weiwei (Released)
27	FW	CHN	Qu Bo (Retired)
28	MF	CHN	Fan Baiqun (to Sichuan Longfor)
30	DF	CHN	Lü Wei (to Liaoning Whowin)
31	MF	CHN	Li Yuanyi (loan return to Guangzhou Evergrande)
32	FW	CHN	Li Zhibin (loan to Shenyang Urban)
50	MF	CHN	Wang Xinyu (to Baoding Yingli ETS)
51	GK	CHN	Lu Zheyu (to Baoding Yingli ETS)
57	FW	CHN	Fan Zhiqiang (to Nantong Zhiyun)
58	DF	CHN	He Jie (to Jilin Baijia)
-	MF	CHN	Wang Guanyi (to Hangzhou Greentown)
-	FW	CHN	Du Junpeng (to Baoding Yingli ETS)
-	MF	CHN	Zhang Shuai (to (Japan) YSCC Yokohama)

=== Yanbian Funde ===
In:

No.	Pos.	Nation	Player
2	DF	CHN	Jiang Weipeng (from Hainan Boying & Seamen)
4	DF	CHN	Zhang Wei (from Tianjin Quanjian)
15	DF	CHN	Han Qingsong (from Qingdao Huanghai)
18	FW	CHN	Jin Chengjun (from Qingdao Huanghai)
20	MF	CHN	Yang Shiyuan (loan from Shanghai SIPG)
26	DF	HUN	Richárd Guzmics (from (Poland) Wisła Kraków)
-	GK	CHN	Zhu Quan (from Shenyang Urban)

Out:

No.	Pos.	Nation	Player
3	DF	CHN	Han Xuan (to Beijing Renhe)
4	DF	CHN	Zhao Ming (to Guangzhou R&F)
15	MF	CHN	Wang Zhipeng (Released)
18	FW	KOR	Ha Tae-goon (to Baoding Yingli ETS)
20	DF	CHN	Cui Min (to Shenzhen)
41	MF	CHN	Shen Feng (to Meixian Techand)

== League One ==
=== Baoding Yingli ETS ===
In:

No.	Pos.	Nation	Player
1	GK	CHN	Mi Tianhe (from Changchun Yatai)
2	MF	CHN	Xie Weichao (from Hunan Billows)
6	MF	NOR	Lars Sætra (from (Sweden) Hammarby IF)
8	DF	CHN	Yang Zexiang (loan from Tianjin Teda)
18	FW	KOR	Ha Tae-goon (from Yanbian Funde)
19	FW	NGA	John Owoeri (from (Sweden) BK Häcken)
23	FW	CHN	Liu Xiaodong (from Changchun Yatai)
24	FW	CHN	Du Junpeng (from Tianjin Teda)
27	MF	CHN	Cong Minhang (Free Agent)
29	MF	CHN	Wang Xinyu (from Tianjin Teda)
32	MF	CHN	Wang Hanbing (from Baotou Nanjiao)
35	DF	CHN	Sun Jiangshan (from Qingdao Jonoon)
36	GK	CHN	Lu Zheyu (from Tianjin Teda)
41	MF	CHN	Zhang Jian (Free Agent)
42	DF	CHN	Wang Tong (Free Agent)
43	FW	CHN	Degn Gang (Free Agent)
45	DF	CHN	Jiang Danyang (from Jiangxi Liansheng)

Out:

No.	Pos.	Nation	Player
1	GK	CHN	Mi Tianhe (loan return to Changchun Yatai)
10	MF	CHN	Liu Zhentao (Released)
23	FW	CHN	Liu Xiaodong (loan return to Changchun Yatai)
24	FW	CHN	Du Junpeng (loan return to Tianjin Teda)
27	DF	CHN	Gong Ming (Released)
29	DF	CHN	Li Guanghui (Released)

=== Beijing BG ===
In:

No.	Pos.	Nation	Player
8	MF	CHN	Wang Jianwen (from Qingdao Jonoon)
13	DF	CHN	Peng Xinbin (Free Agent)
18	FW	CHN	Xu Yihai (from Meixian Techand)
19	FW	CHN	Li Xiang (from Hunan Billows)
24	MF	CIV	Cheick Tioté (from (England) Newcastle United)
27	FW	CHN	Zou Zhongting (from Shanghai Shenxin)
29	GK	CHN	Dong Chunyu (from Guangzhou Evergrande)
45	DF	CHN	Wang Zihao (Free Agent)
46	MF	CHN	Liu Bo (from Jiangxi Liansheng)
47	MF	CHN	Yang Yun (from Beijing Guoan)
54	FW	CHN	Su Jianhu (Free Agent)
56	DF	CHN	Wang Haitao (loan return from Beijing Guoan)

Out:

No.	Pos.	Nation	Player
9	FW	COL	Carmelo Valencia (to (Colombia) La Equidad)
13	DF	MNE	Nikola Vujadinović (to (Spain) Osasuna)
18	GK	CHN	Jiang Bo (to Hebei Elite)
28	MF	CHN	Xue Fei (Released)
29	MF	CHN	Han Yi (loan to Hunan Billows)
36	MF	CHN	Lü Peng (to Beijing Guoan)
51	FW	CHN	Gong Zheng (loan to Beijing BIT)
56	MF	CHN	Wang Jinghui (Released)

=== Beijing Renhe ===
In:

No.	Pos.	Nation	Player
4	DF	CHN	Luo Xin (from Chongqing Lifan)
5	DF	CHN	Wan Houliang (from Qingdao Huanghai)
7	FW	KEN	Ayub Masika (from (Belgium) Lierse)
8	MF	CHN	Wang Xuanhong (from Qingdao Huanghai)
10	MF	BRA	Ivo (from Henan Jianye)
11	FW	ECU	Jaime Ayoví (from (Argentina) Godoy Cruz)
18	DF	CHN	Han Xuan (from Yanbian Funde)
25	DF	CHN	Deng Hanwen (from Nei Mongol Zhongyou)
29	GK	CHN	Sheng Peng (loan return from Heilongjiang Lava Spring)
-	FW	CHN	Wu Dingmao (loan return from Shenyang Urban)
-	MF	CHN	Li Shuai (loan return from Nei Mongol Zhongyou)
-	MF	CHN	Yu Wenhe (loan return from Nei Mongol Zhongyou)
-	MF	CHN	Fan Yunlong (loan return from Guizhou Zhicheng)
-	DF	CHN	Huang Gengji (loan return from Heilongjiang Lava Spring)
-	MF	CHN	Tan Liwei (loan return from Heilongjiang Lava Spring)
-	MF	CHN	Yang Lei (loan return from Heilongjiang Lava Spring)

Out:

No.	Pos.	Nation	Player
3	DF	CHN	Zhang Chenglin (to Guangzhou Evergrande)
4	DF	CHN	Yu Rui (to Changchun Yatai)
7	FW	CRO	Nikica Jelavić (to Guizhou Zhicheng)
8	FW	CHN	Zhang Yuan (loan return to Guangzhou R&F)
10	MF	BIH	Zvjezdan Misimović (Retired)
11	FW	SWE	Guillermo Molins (to (Greece) Panathinaikos)
17	DF	CHN	Sun Jihai (Retired)
18	DF	CHN	Yi Teng (loan return to Guangzhou Evergrande)
23	MF	BIH	Sejad Salihović (to (Switzerland) Gallen)
41	FW	CHN	Wu Dingmao (to Shenyang Urban)
42	DF	CHN	Zhao Jun (to Shenyang Urban)
-	MF	CHN	Li Shuai (loan to Heilongjiang Lava Spring)
-	MF	CHN	Yu Wenhe (loan to Nei Mongol Zhongyou)
-	MF	CHN	Fan Yunlong (to Guizhou Zhicheng)
-	DF	CHN	Huang Gengji (to Heilongjiang Lava Spring)
-	MF	CHN	Tan Liwei (to Heilongjiang Lava Spring)
-	MF	CHN	Yang Lei (to Heilongjiang Lava Spring)

=== Dalian Transcendence ===
In:

No.	Pos.	Nation	Player
9	FW	BIH	Ivan Božić (from (Croatia) Sesvete)
12	FW	CHN	Wang Xiaoxing (from Yinchuan Helanshan)
15	DF	CHN	Otkur Hasan (from Hebei China Fortune)
18	DF	CHN	Fan Peipei (from Chongqing Lifan)
19	DF	CHN	Zheng Jianfeng (from (Portugal) 1º de Dezembro)
20	FW	CHN	Dong Zhiyuan (from Hebei Elite)
22	GK	CHN	Wang Yi (from Wuhan Zall)
30	DF	CHN	Liu Yusheng (from Hunan Billows)
41	DF	CHN	Yao Diran (from Shaanxi Chang'an Athletic)
42	DF	CHN	Cui Binhui (Free Agent)

Out:

No.	Pos.	Nation	Player
4	MF	CHN	Zhang Gong (to Guangzhou R&F)
6	MF	CHN	Han Xu (to Dalian Yifang)
10	FW	KOS	Erton Fejzullahu (to (Norway) Sarpsborg 08)
11	MF	CHN	Su Di (to Wuhan Zall)
15	DF	CHN	Liu Huan (to Chongqing Lifan)
19	FW	BRA	William (to (Brazil) Macaé)
23	GK	CHN	Guo Wei (to Shanghai Shenxin)
31	FW	CHN	Du Wenxiang (to Sichuan Longfor)
32	MF	CHN	Nan Yunqi (to Dalian Boyoung)
36	MF	CHN	Liu Tao (to Shenzhen Ledman)
37	MF	CHN	Liu Yingchen (to Dalian Yifang)

=== Dalian Yifang ===
In:

No.	Pos.	Nation	Player
5	DF	ARG	Jonathan Ferrari (from (Argentina) Patronato)
10	FW	CIV	Yannick Boli (from (Russia) Anzhi Makhachkala)
12	DF	CHN	Zhou Ting (from Beijing Guoan)
17	FW	CHN	Yan Peng (loan return from Shenyang Urban)
21	MF	CHN	Liu Yingchen (from Dalian Transcendence)
24	MF	CHN	Han Xu (from Dalian Transcendence)
-	MF	ROU	Constantin Budescu (loan return from (Romania) Astra Giurgiu)
-	FW	CHN	Duan Yunzi (loan return from Shenyang Urban)

Out:

No.	Pos.	Nation	Player
10	MF	ROU	Constantin Budescu (to (Romania) Astra Giurgiu)
11	FW	SLE	Mohamed Bangura (to (Sweden) Dalkurd FF)
17	MF	CHN	Zhang Hui (loan to Shaanxi Chang'an Athletic)
22	FW	LBR	Sekou Oliseh (Released)
32	DF	CHN	Eddy Francis (to (Portugal) Boavista)
50	DF	CHN	Cheng Rui (to Shanghai Shenhua)
-	FW	CHN	Duan Yunzi (to Shenyang Urban)

=== Hangzhou Greentown ===
In:

No.	Pos.	Nation	Player
2	MF	CHN	Wang Guanyi (from Tianjin Teda)
14	MF	CHN	Huang Shibo (from Shijiazhuang Ever Bright)
41	DF	CHN	Cao Xiaodong (from Tianjin Quanjian)
-	MF	CHN	Wei Zhaokun (loan return from Wuhan Zall)
-	FW	TUN	Imed Louati (loan return from (Sweden) Dalkurd FF)

Out:

No.	Pos.	Nation	Player
1	GK	CHN	Zhang Lei (loan to Yunnan Lijiang)
5	DF	CHN	Wu Wei (Retired)
14	MF	CHN	Feng Gang (loan to Henan Jianye)
18	DF	CHN	Zhao Yuhao (to Hebei China Fortune)
21	DF	CHN	Cao Haiqing (to Jiangsu Suning)
25	MF	CHN	Huang Xiyang (to Wuhan Zall)
30	MF	CRO	Sammir (loan return to Jiangsu Suning)
32	DF	KOR	Oh Beom-seok (to (South Korea) Gangwon FC)
54	MF	CHN	Wu Qingsong (to Dalian Boyang)
55	MF	CHN	Yi Baidi (to Jiangsu Yancheng Dingli)
56	MF	CHN	Liu Heng (to Henan Jianye)
57	MF	CHN	Shen Jin (to Xinjiang Tianshan Leopard)
60	FW	CHN	Wang Chaolong (to Jiangsu Yancheng Dingli)
-	MF	CHN	Wei Zhaokun (to Wuhan Zall)
-	FW	TUN	Imed Louati (to (Denmark) Vejle Boldklub)
-	MF	CHN	Li Lan (to Shanghai Shenxin)

=== Meizhou Hakka ===
In:

No.	Pos.	Nation	Player
10	FW	BUL	Valeri Bojinov (from (Serbia) Partizan)
11	DF	CHN	Zhang Hongjiang (from (Portugal) Gondomar)
12	DF	CHN	Yao Junsheng (loan from Shandong Luneng)
15	DF	CHN	Luo Xi (from Shanghai Shenhua)
16	MF	CHN	Guo Jing (loan from Guangzhou Evergrande)
18	DF	CHN	Huo Liang (from Baotou Nanjiao)
21	MF	CHN	Tan Jiajun (from Guangzhou Evergrande)
24	DF	CHN	Yang Wenji (from Hebei China Fortune)
25	GK	CHN	Guo Jiawei (Free agent)
41	MF	CHN	Li Zhe (Free agent)
-	MF	CHN	Tang Shi (loan return from (Portugal) Paços de Ferreira)

Out:

No.	Pos.	Nation	Player
1	GK	CHN	Li Weijun (Retired)
5	DF	CHN	Xiao Zhen (to Sichuan Longfor)
8	MF	GAB	Merlin Tandjigora (Released)
16	MF	CHN	Ba Dun (loan return to Beijing Guoan)
17	MF	CHN	Yu Jianfeng (to Nantong Zhiyun)
21	DF	CHN	Liu Junhua (Released)
31	MF	CHN	Tang Shi (loan to Beijing Guoan)
32	DF	CHN	Li Bowen (loan return to Beijing Guoan)
33	DF	CHN	Li Siyuan (to Shenzhen Ledman)
35	FW	CHN	Zhu Zhengrong (loan return to Shanghai SIPG)
44	MF	CHN	Huang Zhengyan (to Qingdao Huanghai)
45	FW	CHN	Sui Jiayu (to Wuhan Zall)

=== Nei Mongol Zhongyou ===
In:

No.	Pos.	Nation	Player
7	FW	SEN	Malick Mané (from (Kazakhstan) Taraz)
10	FW	BRA	Dori (from (Brazil) Fluminense)
14	MF	CHN	Yu Wenhe (loan from Beijing Renhe)
17	DF	CHN	Duan Jieyi (from Shanghai Shenxin)
21	MF	CHN	Zhu Zhengyu (loan from Shanghai SIPG)
25	MF	CHN	Mou Shantao (from Henan Jianye)
31	MF	CHN	Li Gen (from Zhejiang Yiteng)
33	DF	CHN	Zhang Tianlong (loan from Liaoning Whowin)
41	MF	CHN	Mirdan Ablikim (Free agent)
-	FW	CHN	Wang Yida (loan return from Heilongjiang Lava Spring)
-	DF	CHN	Li Boyang (loan return from Tianjin Huochetou)

Out:

No.	Pos.	Nation	Player
2	DF	CHN	Li Chenguang (loan to Shaanxi Chang'an Athletic)
6	DF	CHN	Jiao Zhe (to Shijiazhuang Ever Bright)
7	MF	CHN	Wang Yunlong (to Zhejiang Yiteng)
9	MF	SRB	Nenad Milijaš (to (Serbia) Red Star Belgrade)
10	FW	BRA	Dori (loan return to (Brazil) Fluminense)
14	MF	CHN	Yu Wenhe (loan return to Beijing Renhe)
18	MF	CHN	Lin Kun (to Heilongjiang Lava Spring)
21	MF	CHN	Li Shuai (loan return to Beijing Renhe)
25	DF	CHN	Deng Hanwen (to Beijing Renhe)
30	DF	AUS	Jonas Salley (Released)
33	MF	CHN	Guo Sheng (to Shijiazhuang Ever Bright)
41	FW	CHN	Wang Yida (to Heilongjiang Lava Spring)
42	FW	CHN	Wang Haoyu (Released)
-	DF	CHN	Li Boyang (to Heilongjiang Lava Spring)

=== Qingdao Huanghai ===
In:

No.	Pos.	Nation	Player
4	DF	CHN	Xu Yougang (loan from Shanghai Shenhua)
5	DF	CHN	Sun Guoliang (from Hunan Billows)
6	DF	CHN	Yang Yun (from Chongqing Lifan)
10	MF	ESP	Joan Verdú (Free agent)
16	MF	CHN	Deng Zhuoxiang (loan from Shanghai Shenhua)
22	GK	CHN	Zhao Shi (from Beijing Guoan)
25	DF	CHN	Yu Yang (from Sichuan Longfor)
37	DF	CHN	Yao Jiangshan (from Hunan Billows)
38	FW	CHN	Jia Yinbo (from (Portugal) Oriental Dragon)
41	MF	CHN	Fang Xinfeng (Free agent)
42	MF	CHN	Huang Zhengyan (from Meizhou Hakka)
46	MF	CHN	Yang Chengyun (from Shanghai Shenhua)
47	MF	CHN	Li Peng (Free agent)
54	GK	CHN	Wang Shuo (from Chongqing Lifan)

Out:

No.	Pos.	Nation	Player
1	GK	CHN	Teng Shangkun (to Tianjin Teda)
4	DF	CHN	Xu Yougang (loan return to Shanghai Shenhua)
5	DF	CHN	Wan Houliang (to Beijing Renhe)
6	DF	CHN	Han Qingsong (to Yanbian Funde)
10	FW	BRA	Yuri (to (Spain) SD Ponferradina)
14	MF	CHN	Wang Xuanhong (to Beijing Renhe)
16	MF	CHN	Chen Zhuo (Released)
18	MF	CHN	Zhang Jiaqi (loan return to Guangzhou Evergrande)
19	DF	CHN	Jiang Tao (to Beijing Guoan)
20	MF	CHN	Qu Kai (to Beijing BIT)
22	GK	CHN	Liu Jun (to Shenyang Urban)
25	MF	CHN	Jiang Kun (Retired)
29	MF	CHN	Pan Weihao (loan return to Shanghai Shenhua)
32	DF	CHN	Leng Shiao (loan return to Shanghai Shenhua)
41	MF	CHN	Jin Chengjun (to Yanbian Funde)
45	MF	CHN	Dan Yiming (Released)
48	DF	CHN	Liu Deng (Released)
49	DF	CHN	Yu Jiawei (Released)
50	MF	CHN	Wu Kai (to Qingdao Jonoon)
51	GK	CHN	Yu Ziqin (Released)
52	DF	CHN	Zhang Dapeng (Released)
53	MF	CHN	Cao Zhen (Released)
56	DF	CHN	Yu Yang (loan return to Sichuan Longfor)
58	FW	CHN	Du Jinlong (to Beijing BIT)
60	FW	CHN	Liu Hangcheng (Released)

=== Shanghai Shenxin ===
In:

No.	Pos.	Nation	Player
5	DF	ESP	Raúl Rodríguez (from (United States) Houston Dynamo)
7	FW	CHN	Pan Chaoran (from Hainan Boying & Seamen)
12	MF	CHN	Xia Ningning (from Tianjin Quanjian)
21	DF	CHN	Xu Xiaolong (loan from Hebei China Fortune)
23	FW	BRA	Cleiton Silva (from (Thailand) Muangthong United)
27	GK	CHN	Guo Wei (from Dalian Transcendence)
41	DF	CHN	Mao Shiming (loan return from Hainan Boying & Seamen)
51	DF	CHN	Jin Chenchen (Free Agent)
52	MF	CHN	Li Lan (from Hangzhou Greentown)
56	DF	CHN	Tian Junjie (from Meixian Techand)
-	FW	CHN	Mai Jiajian (loan return from Guangzhou R&F)

Out:

No.	Pos.	Nation	Player
5	DF	CHN	Jiang Jiajun (to Shandong Luneng)
7	DF	CHN	Xu Wen (Released)
12	DF	CHN	Sun Kai (to Shanghai Shenhua)
13	MF	CHN	Hu Yongfa (to Meixian Techand)
17	FW	CHN	Zou Zhongting (to Beijing BG)
19	MF	CHN	Jia Tianzi (to Shanghai SIPG)
21	MF	CHN	Liu Junnan (to Shijiazhuang Ever Bright)
23	DF	CHN	Duan Jieyi (to Nei Mongol Zhongyou)
25	FW	CHN	Mai Jiajian (to Guangzhou R&F)
26	GK	CHN	Zhang Xunwei (to Jiangxi Liansheng)
27	FW	NGA	Daniel Chima Chukwu (to (Poland) Legia Warsaw)
30	MF	BRA	Davi (Released)
58	FW	CHN	Chen Yu (to Yunnan Lijiang)

=== Shenzhen F.C. ===
In:

No.	Pos.	Nation	Player
1	GK	CHN	Guan Zhen (from Shijiazhuang Ever Bright)
5	MF	CHN	Zhang Yuan (loan from Shandong Luneng)
6	MF	CHN	Zhang Jiaqi (loan from Guangzhou Evergrande)
9	FW	COL	Harold Preciado (from (Colombia) Deportivo Cali)
10	FW	NGA	Chinedu Obasi (from (Sweden) AIK)
11	FW	CHN	Zhang Yuan (from Guangzhou R&F)
19	DF	CHN	Li Xiaoming (loan from Shanghai Shenhua)
27	MF	CHN	Zu Pengchao (from Shanghai Shenhua)
28	FW	CHN	Yu Shuai (loan return from Hebei Elite)
29	DF	CHN	Wang Dalong (from Zhejiang Yiteng)
30	DF	CHN	Cui Min (from Yanbian Funde)
44	GK	CHN	Abdunabi Aim (Free agent)
47	MF	CHN	Jiang Chenghao (from Shandong Luneng)
48	MF	CHN	Liang Yu (from Henan Jianye)
49	DF	CHN	Wang Youle (from Shandong Luneng)
51	DF	CHN	Sun Xiaobin (from Shandong Luneng)
53	MF	CHN	Dai Chunlei (from Shandong Luneng)
54	MF	CHN	Xie Mingqi (from Shandong Luneng)
55	DF	CHN	Zhang Jinxin (from Shanghai SIPG)
56	DF	CHN	Chen Fujun (from Shanghai SIPG)
60	GK	CHN	Xiong Ziwen (from Tianjin Huochetou)
-	GK	CHN	Wei Jian (loan return from Sichuan Longfor)

Out:

No.	Pos.	Nation	Player
7	MF	CHN	Gao Tianyi (to Jiangsu Suning)
9	FW	JAM	Deshorn Brown (to (United States) Tampa Bay Rowdies)
10	FW	SEN	Babacar Gueye (to Xinjiang Tianshan Leopard)
11	MF	CHN	Wang Zihua (Released)
17	FW	HKG	Paulinho Piracicaba (Released)
24	DF	CHN	Xiong Changqing (to Jiangxi Liansheng)
29	DF	FRA	Helton (Released)
33	DF	CHN	Huang Xin (to Meixian Techand)
42	DF	CHN	Ding Guoliang (to Shaanxi Chang'an Athletic)
45	MF	CHN	Pang Haitao (Released)
47	DF	CHN	Liu Shuai (to Shanghai Sunfun)
57	MF	CHN	Huang Long (to Meixian Techand)
58	MF	CHN	Wu Wei'an (Retired)
59	FW	CHN	Wei Jingxing (loan to Shanghai Sunfun)

=== Shijiazhuang Ever Bright ===
In:

No.	Pos.	Nation	Player
1	GK	CHN	Bai Xiaolei (from Zhejiang Yiteng)
11	FW	BRA	Adriano (from (South Korea) FC Seoul)
16	DF	CHN	Jiao Zhe (from Nei Mongol Zhongyou)
19	DF	CHN	Zheng Kaimu (loan from Shanghai Shenhua)
20	DF	CHN	Zhao Chengle (loan return from (Portugal) Pedras Salgadas)
25	FW	CHN	Liu Xinyu (from Hunan Billows)
27	FW	CHN	Liu Ziming (loan return from (Portugal) Pedras Salgadas)
35	MF	CHN	Guo Sheng (from Nei Mongol Zhongyou)
41	MF	CHN	Zhou Shengzhi (from Shandong Luneng)
42	MF	CHN	Zhang Hao (from Shandong Luneng)
45	MF	CHN	Liu Junnan (from Shanghai Shenxin)

Out:

No.	Pos.	Nation	Player
1	GK	CHN	Zhu Jiaqi (Released)
4	DF	CHN	Li Chao (to Wuhan Zall)
5	DF	CHN	Jiang Jihong (to Guangzhou R&F)
7	FW	CHN	Mao Jianqing (to Shanghai Shenhua)
8	MF	CHN	Cui Peng (Released)
9	FW	VEN	Mario Rondón (Released)
10	MF	POR	Rúben Micael (loan to (Israel) Maccabi Tel Aviv)
11	MF	CHN	Huang Shibo (to Hangzhou Greentown)
14	DF	KOR	Cho Yong-hyung (to (South Korea) Jeju United)
16	FW	FRA	Jean-Philippe Mendy (to (United Arab Emirates) Baniyas)
20	DF	CHN	Li Kai (to Jiangxi Liansheng)
22	GK	CHN	Guan Zhen (to Shenzhen FC)
23	DF	CHN	Hu Wei (to Nantong Zhiyun)
25	DF	CHN	Mi Haolun (to Tianjin Quanjian)
30	FW	BRA	Diego Maurício (loan return to (Brazil) Bragantino)
35	MF	CHN	Li Tixiang (to Guangzhou R&F)
42	DF	CHN	Hao Ming (loan to Suzhou Dongwu)
47	DF	CHN	Yue Zhilei (loan to Beijing BIT)
48	DF	CHN	Wang Zhilin (Released)
49	DF	CHN	Li Ao (Released)
52	FW	CHN	Su Jingyu (Released)

=== Wuhan Zall ===
In:

No.	Pos.	Nation	Player
2	DF	CHN	Huang Bowen (from Shanghai Shenhua)
5	DF	CHN	Zhang Yaokun (from Guangzhou R&F)
6	DF	CHN	Li Chao (from Shijiazhuang Ever Bright)
9	MF	CHN	Li Zhichao (from Jiangsu Suning)
10	FW	BOL	Marcelo Moreno (from Changchun Yatai)
11	MF	CHN	Su Di (from Dalian Transcendence)
14	MF	CHN	Huang Xiyang (from Hangzhou Greentown)
17	FW	CIV	Jean Evrard Kouassi (from Shanghai SIPG)
25	MF	CHN	Wei Zhaokun (from Hangzhou Greentown)
41	GK	CHN	Zhu Zisen (from Hebei Elite)
42	MF	CHN	Tong Xiaoxing (from Xinjiang Tianshan Leopard)
43	DF	CHN	Ni Bo (from Hong Kong R&F)
44	MF	CHN	Wu Jie (Free Agent)
55	FW	CHN	Sui Jiayu (from Meizhou Hakka)

Out:

No.	Pos.	Nation	Player
2	DF	CHN	Huang Bowen (loan return to Shanghai Shenhua)
5	DF	CHN	Qiu Tianyi (to Tianjin Teda)
6	DF	ISL	Sölvi Ottesen (to (Thailand) Buriram United)
9	FW	BRA	Guto (to Zhejiang Yiteng)
14	FW	CHN	Zhou Liao (loan return to Tianjin Teda)
16	FW	CHN	Yang Chaosheng (loan return to Guangzhou Evergrande)
19	MF	CHN	Wang Rui (loan return to Guangzhou Evergrande)
17	MF	CHN	Huang Fengtao (to Shenzhen Ledman)
22	GK	CHN	Wang Yi (to Dalian Transcendence)
26	DF	CHN	Ke Zhao (to Henan Jianye)
29	MF	CHN	Wei Zhaokun (loan return to Hangzhou Greentown)
31	MF	CRC	Michael Barrantes (to (Costa Rica) Cartaginés)
34	MF	CHN	Wang Junhui (loan return to Guangzhou Evergrande)
43	MF	CHN	Wang Jian (Released)

=== Xinjiang Tianshan Leopard ===
In:

No.	Pos.	Nation	Player
8	MF	CHN	Wu Peng (from Nantong Zhiyun)
9	FW	CMR	Yves Ekwalla Herman (from Guizhou Zhicheng)
10	FW	SEN	Babacar Gueye (from Shenzhen)
27	DF	CHN	Parhat Al-Bawusu (from Baotou Nanjiao)
30	MF	CHN	Shen Jin (from Hangzhou Greentown)
35	FW	CHN	Shewket Yalqun (loan from Guangzhou Evergrande)

Out:

No.	Pos.	Nation	Player
8	MF	CHN	Wang Kang (to Jiangxi Liansheng)
9	FW	BIH	Nusmir Fajić (to (Romania) Universitatea Craiova)
10	MF	HKG	Itaparica (to (Hong Kong) Tai Po)
14	DF	CHN	Mustapa Nurahmet (Released)
16	MF	BRA	Rudnei (Released)
21	MF	CHN	Tong Xiaoxing (to Wuhan Zall)
26	MF	CHN	Nan Xiaoheng (to Jiangsu Suning)
27	DF	CHN	Fang Zhong (Released)
28	MF	CHN	Liu Shun (Released)
30	FW	CHN	Shewket Yalqun (loan return to Guangzhou Evergrande)

=== Yunnan Lijiang ===
In:

No.	Pos.	Nation	Player
5	DF	BRA	Johnny (from Qingdao Jonoon)
7	FW	CHN	Chen Yu (from Shanghai Shenxin)
9	FW	BRA	Kaio (from (Thailand) Buriram United)
14	GK	CHN	Xing Yonggang (Free Agent)
15	DF	CHN	Meng Yang (from Beijing BIT)
21	DF	CHN	Cao Guodong (from Hunan Billows)
24	DF	KOR	Kim Hyun-hun (from (Japan) Avispa Fukuoka)
34	MF	CHN	Su Shun (from (Portugal) Felgueiras 1932)
35	GK	CHN	Zhang Lei (loan from Hangzhou Greentown)

Out:

No.	Pos.	Nation	Player
5	DF	CHN	Zhao Kun (Released)
7	MF	CHN	Zhen Jie (loan return to Guangzhou Evergrande)
16	MF	CHN	Wu Bo (to Sichuan Longfor)
17	FW	CHN	Yang Zi (to Shenzhen Ledman)
28	DF	CHN	Shi Yong (Released)

=== Zhejiang Yiteng ===
In:

No.	Pos.	Nation	Player
1	GK	CHN	Guo Chunquan (from Baotou Nanjiao)
2	DF	CHN	Shan Haiyang (from Shanghai Shenhua)
6	DF	CHN	He Yang (from Qingdao Jonoon)
7	MF	NED	Romeo Castelen (from (South Korea) Suwon Samsung Bluewings)
15	MF	CHN	Wu Chen (loan return from Hainan Boying & Seamen)
17	FW	BRA	Guto (from Wuhan Zall)
22	MF	CHN	Wang Yunlong (from Nei Mongol Zhongyou)
24	MF	CHN	Wang Kai (from Wuhan Chufeng Heli)
30	DF	CHN	Ren Xin (from Jiangxi Liansheng)

Out:

No.	Pos.	Nation	Player
1	GK	CHN	Bai Xiaolei (to Shijiazhuang Ever Bright)
7	MF	CHN	Li Jiahe (to Liaoning)
16	DF	CHN	Wang Dalong (to Shenzhen)
19	FW	COL	Ricardo Steer (to (Colombia) Jaguares de Córdoba)
24	FW	CHN	Ye Weichao (to Meixian Techand)
31	MF	CHN	Li Gen (to Nei Mongol Zhongyou)
33	FW	BRA	Rodrigo (to (Brazil) Bragantino)

== Withdrawal ==
=== Tianjin Huochetou ===
In:

No.	Pos.	Nation	Player

Out:

No.	Pos.	Nation	Player
1	GK	CHN	Xiong Ziwen (to Shenzhen)
4	DF	CHN	Xi Mo-Rigen (Released)
5	FW	CHN	Meng Xiangqi (Released)
6	MF	CHN	Zou Luo (Released)
7	DF	CHN	Chen Huifeng (to Dalian Boyang)
8	MF	CHN	Li Wenxin (Released)
9	MF	CHN	Wang Erzhuo (to Shaanxi Chang'an Athletic)
10	MF	CHN	Zhao Haichao (to Dalian Boyang)
11	MF	CHN	Hu Mingtian (to Chengdu Qbao)
12	DF	CHN	Niu Xiucheng (to Zhenjiang Huasa)
13	MF	CHN	Ma Hongwei (Released)
15	FW	CHN	Zhang Bo (to Suzhou Dongwu)
16	MF	CHN	Li Zhi (to Suzhou Dongwu)
17	MF	CHN	Shi Haonan (Released)
18	MF	CHN	Wu Yuheng (Released)
19	FW	CHN	Li Shuang (Released)
20	FW	CHN	Yang Quan (Released)
21	FW	CHN	Yu Zhihao (Released)
22	GK	CHN	Zhang Yan (Released)
23	FW	CHN	Wu Lei (Released)
24	DF	CHN	Li Boyang (loan return to Nei Mongol Zhongyou)
26	MF	CHN	Song Qi (loan return to Tianjin Teda)
27	GK	CHN	Sun Qibin (to Tianjin Quanjian)
28	MF	CHN	Wang Guanyi (loan return to Tianjin Teda)
29	DF	CHN	Pang Lei (to Zhenjiang Huasa)
31	DF	CHN	Fang Jianyu (Released)
33	MF	CHN	Zheng Haiping (Released)
