= 2019 Tianjin TEDA F.C. season =

Tianjin Teda 2019
- Chairman: Dong Wensheng
- Manager: Uli Stielike
- Stadium: Tianjin Olympic Center
- Super League: 7th
- FA Cup: Quarter-finals
- Top goalscorer: League: Jonathan (13); All: Jonathan (14)
- Average home league attendance: 19,038

The 2019 Tianjin Teda F.C. season saw the Tianjin TEDA F.C team competing in the Chinese Super League and Chinese FA Cup. The season was Teda's 22nd professional season under its current name. The club finished 14th place during the 2018 Chinese league season and managed to escape being relegated.

== Current squad ==
Note: Flags indicate national team as defined under FIFA eligibility rules; some limited exceptions apply. Players may hold more than one non-FIFA nationality.

No.	Pos.	Nation	Player
1	GK	CHN	Du Jia
2	DF	CHN	Wang Zhenghao
3	DF	CHN	Zhao Honglüe
4	DF	CHN	Yang Fan
5	DF	CHN	Qiu Tianyi
6	DF	CHN	Gao Jiarun
7	FW	GHA	Frank Acheampong
8	FW	CHN	Zhang Chiming
9	FW	GER	Sandro Wagner
10	FW	BRA	Johnathan Goiano
11	DF	CHN	Tan Wangsong
13	MF	CHN	Zheng Kaimu
14	DF	CHN	Rong Hao
15	DF	GER	Felix Bastians (captain)
16	DF	CHN	Peng Rui
17	FW	CHN	Hui Jiakang

No.	Pos.	Nation	Player
18	FW	CHN	Piao Taoyu
19	DF	CHN	Bai Yuefeng
20	FW	CHN	Mao Haoyu
21	MF	CHN	Zhao Yingjie
22	MF	CHN	Guo Hao
23	FW	CHN	Lei Yongchi
25	MF	CHN	Mirahmetjan Muzepper
26	DF	CHN	Cao Yang
27	FW	CHN	Xie Weijun
28	FW	CHN	Yang Wanshun
29	GK	CHN	Yang Qipeng
30	DF	CHN	Liu Yang
32	FW	CHN	Su Yuanjie
33	GK	CHN	Teng Shangkun
35	DF	CHN	Lan Jingxuan

== Friendlies ==
=== Pre-season ===
11 January 2019 Friendly	Selección AFE (Spain)	1-2	(China) Tianjin Teda	Murcia, Spain
	Pulga 65' (pen.)	Report	Zhao Yingjie 50'; Sun Ya 66'

21 January 2019 Friendly	Arminia Bielefeld (Germany)	2-1	(China) Tianjin Teda	Benidorm, Spain
	Voglsammer 52', 90+1'	Report	Johnathan 32'

23 January 2019 Friendly	FC Jumilla (Spain)	1-0	(China) Tianjin Teda	Benidorm, Spain

26 January 2019 Friendly	Ventspils (Latvia)	4–1	(China) Tianjin Teda	Benidorm, Spain
		Report

28 January 2019 Friendly	LASK (Austria)	1-1	(China) Tianjin Teda	Algorfa, Spain
	Tetteh 40' (pen.)	Report	Trauner 42' (o.g.)

30 January 2019 Friendly	La Nucía (Spain)	1-2	(China) Tianjin Teda	La Nucía, Spain
		Report

15 February 2019 Friendly	Tianjin Teda (China)	0-1	(South Korea) Gangwon	Guangzhou, China
		Report

17 February 2019 Friendly	Tianjin Teda (China)	3-2	(South Korea) Gangwon	Guangzhou, China
	Acheampong 23'; Zhang Chiming 27'; Johnathan 29'	Report	65', 85'

21 February 2019 Friendly	Tianjin Teda (China)	2-3	(China) Henan Jianye	Guangzhou, China
	Zhang Chiming; Liu Yang	Report	Bassogog; Ivo; Ma Xingyu

24 February 2019 Friendly	Tianjin Teda (China)	2-1	(China) Heilongjiang Lava Spring	Guangzhou, China
	Acheampong 22' (pen.), 59'	Report	Wang Ziming 36'

== Formal Competitions ==
=== Chinese Super League ===
==== Results ====
3 March 2019 1	Jiangsu Suning	–	Tianjin Teda	Nanjing
19:35 UTC+8				Stadium: Nanjing Olympic Sports Centre

8 March 2019 2	Guangzhou Evergrande	–	Tianjin Teda	Guangzhou
19:35 UTC+8				Stadium: Tianhe Stadium

29 March 2019 3	Tianjin Teda	–	Guangzhou R&F	Tianjin
19:35 UTC+8				Stadium: Tianjin Olympic Center

7 April 2019 4	Dalian Yifang	–	Tianjin Teda	Dalian
15:30 UTC+8				Stadium: Dalian Sports Center Stadium

13 April 2019 5	Tianjin Teda	–	Tianjin Tianhai	Tianjin
19:35 UTC+8				Stadium: Tianjin Olympic Center

20 April 2019 6	Henan Jianye	–	Tianjin Teda	Zhengzhou
19:35 UTC+8				Stadium: Hanghai Stadium

28 April 2019 7	Tianjin Teda	–	Shanghai SIPG	Tianjin
15:30 UTC+8				Stadium: Tianjin Olympic Center

4 May 2019 8	Wuhan Zall	–	Tianjin Teda	Wuhan
15:30 UTC+8				Stadium: Dongxihu Sports Centre

10 May 2019 9	Tianjin Teda	–	Shanghai Shenhua	Tianjin
19:35 UTC+8				Stadium: Tianjin Olympic Center

19 May 2019 10	Tianjin Teda	–	Hebei CFFC	Tianjin
15:30 UTC+8				Stadium: Tianjin Olympic Center

25 May 2019 11	Beijing Renhe	–	Tianjin Teda	Beijing
15:30 UTC+8				Stadium: Fengtai Stadium

2 June 2019 12	Jiangsu Suning	–	Tianjin Teda	Nanjing
19:35 UTC+8				Stadium: Nanjing Olympic Sports Centre

16 June 2019 13	Shenzhen	–	Tianjin Teda	Shenzhen
19:35 UTC+8				Stadium: Shenzhen Universiade Sports Centre

3 March 2019 14	Jiangsu Suning	–	Tianjin Teda	Nanjing
19:35 UTC+8				Stadium: Nanjing Olympic Sports Centre

3 March 2019 15	Jiangsu Suning	–	Tianjin Teda	Nanjing
19:35 UTC+8				Stadium: Nanjing Olympic Sports Centre

3 March 2019 16	Jiangsu Suning	–	Tianjin Teda	Nanjing
19:35 UTC+8				Stadium: Nanjing Olympic Sports Centre

3 March 2019 17	Jiangsu Suning	–	Tianjin Teda	Nanjing
19:35 UTC+8				Stadium: Nanjing Olympic Sports Centre

3 March 2019 18	Jiangsu Suning	–	Tianjin Teda	Nanjing
19:35 UTC+8				Stadium: Nanjing Olympic Sports Centre

3 March 2019 19	Jiangsu Suning	–	Tianjin Teda	Nanjing
19:35 UTC+8				Stadium: Nanjing Olympic Sports Centre

3 March 2019 20	Jiangsu Suning	–	Tianjin Teda	Nanjing
19:35 UTC+8				Stadium: Nanjing Olympic Sports Centre

3 March 2019 21	Jiangsu Suning	–	Tianjin Teda	Nanjing
19:35 UTC+8				Stadium: Nanjing Olympic Sports Centre

3 March 2019 22	Jiangsu Suning	–	Tianjin Teda	Nanjing
19:35 UTC+8				Stadium: Nanjing Olympic Sports Centre

3 March 2019 23	Jiangsu Suning	–	Tianjin Teda	Nanjing
19:35 UTC+8				Stadium: Nanjing Olympic Sports Centre

3 March 2019 24	Jiangsu Suning	–	Tianjin Teda	Nanjing
19:35 UTC+8				Stadium: Nanjing Olympic Sports Centre

3 March 2019 25	Jiangsu Suning	–	Tianjin Teda	Nanjing
19:35 UTC+8				Stadium: Nanjing Olympic Sports Centre

3 March 2019 26	Jiangsu Suning	–	Tianjin Teda	Nanjing
19:35 UTC+8				Stadium: Nanjing Olympic Sports Centre

3 March 2019 27	Jiangsu Suning	–	Tianjin Teda	Nanjing
19:35 UTC+8				Stadium: Nanjing Olympic Sports Centre

3 March 2019 28	Jiangsu Suning	–	Tianjin Teda	Nanjing
19:35 UTC+8				Stadium: Nanjing Olympic Sports Centre

3 March 2019 29	Jiangsu Suning	–	Tianjin Teda	Nanjing
19:35 UTC+8				Stadium: Nanjing Olympic Sports Centre

3 March 2019 30	Jiangsu Suning	–	Tianjin Teda	Nanjing
19:35 UTC+8				Stadium: Nanjing Olympic Sports Centre

=== Chinese FA Cup ===
First match to be played in April or May.
