= Nan Xiaoheng =

Chinese footballer

Nan Xiaoheng 南小亨
Personal information
- Full name: Nan Xiaoheng
- Date of birth: 23 December 1995 (age 30)
- Place of birth: Aksu, Xinjiang, China
- Height: 1.77 m (5 ft 9 1/2 in)
- Position: Forward

Team information
- Current team: Nantong Zhiyun
- Number: 19

Youth career
- 2008–2012: Shanghai Shenhua
- 2013: Shenyang Zhongze
- 2015: Xinjiang Tianshan Leopard
- 2017: Jiangsu Suning

Senior career*
Years	Team	Apps	(Gls)
2014	Shenyang Zhongze	0	(0)
2016–2017	Xinjiang Tianshan Leopard	17	(2)
2017–2019	Jiangsu Suning	3	(0)
2020–2023	Sichuan Jiuniu	43	(4)
2022	→ Shijiazhuang Gongfu (loan)	30	(3)
2023	Shijiazhuang Gongfu	23	(1)
2024	Nanjing City	12	(0)
2025–	Nantong Zhiyun	9	(0)
- * Club domestic league appearances and goals as of 9 March 2026

Nan Xiaoheng (Chinese: 南小亨; pinyin: Nán Xiǎohēng; born 23 December 1995) is a Chinese footballer who currently plays for Nantong Zhiyun in the China League One.

== Club career ==
Nan Xiaoheng started his professional football career when he was promoted to China League One side Shenyang Zhongze's first team squad. On 14 April 2014, he made his senior debut in a 6–0 away win over amateur team Shenyang Riverside in the 2014 Chinese FA Cup. Nan joined hometown club Xinjiang Tianshan Leopard in 2015 after Shenyang Zhongze's dissolution. He was promoted to the first team in the 2016 season. On 12 March 2016, Nan made his debut for the club in a 2–1 away defeat against Shenzhen in the opening match of the season, coming on as a substitute for Tong Xiaoxing in the 69th minute. Nan scored his first and second senior goal on 10 April 2016, in a 3–2 away defeat against Qingdao Huanghai.

Nan transferred to Chinese Super League side Jiangsu Suning in February 2017. He failed to register for official league match due to transfer slot limit and played for reserve team instead. Nan officially joined Jiangsu Suning in 2018. He made his Super League debut on 11 March 2018 in a 2–1 home defeat against Beijing Sinobo Guoan, coming on for Xie Pengfei in the 79th minute.

== Career statistics ==
As of 31 December 2023.

Appearances and goals by club, season and competition
Club	Season	League			National Cup		Continental		Other		Total	
Club	Season	Division	Apps	Goals	Apps	Goals	Apps	Goals	Apps	Goals	Apps	Goals
Shenyang Zhongze	2014	China League One	0	0	1	0	-		-		1	0
Xinjiang Tianshan Leopard	2016	China League One	17	2	2	0	-		-		19	2
Jiangsu Suning	2018	Chinese Super League	3	0	0	0	-		-		3	0
Sichuan Jiuniu	2020	China League One	14	2	-		-		-		14	2
Sichuan Jiuniu	2021	China League One	29	2	3	1	-		-		32	3
Sichuan Jiuniu	Total		43	4	3	1	0	0	0	0	46	5
Shijiazhuang Gongfu (loan)	2022	China League One	30	3	0	0	-		-		30	3
Shijiazhuang Gongfu	2023	China League One	23	1	0	0	-		-		23	1
Career total			116	10	6	1	0	0	0	0	122	11
