= Chen Kejiang =

Chinese footballer (born 1997)

Personal information
- Date of birth: 18 January 1997 (age 29)
- Place of birth: Chongqing, Sichuan, China
- Height: 1.76 m (5 ft 9 in)
- Position: Defender

Team information
- Current team: Chongqing Chunlei
- Number: 6

Youth career
- Shanghai SIPG
- 2017–2020: Chongqing Lifan

Senior career*
Years	Team	Apps	(Gls)
2020–2022	Chongqing Lifan	1	(0)
2021	→ Shanxi Longjin (loan)	28	(6)
2022	→ Quanzhou Yassin (loan)	14	(0)
2023	Guangxi Yongcheng		
2024–	Chongqing Chunlei	5	(0)
- * Club domestic league appearances and goals as of 14:01, 1 August 2025 (UTC)

Chen Kejiang (simplified Chinese: 陈炣江; traditional Chinese: 陳炣江; pinyin: Chén Kějiāng; born 18 January 1997) is a Chinese footballer currently playing as a defender for Chongqing Chunlei.

== Club career ==
Chen signed with Chongqing Lifan in 2017, having left the academy of Shanghai SIPG. He spent three years in the Chongqing Lifan reserve team, eventually earning the captaincy. He was promoted to the senior team of Chongqing Lifan in the 2020 Chinese Super League season, and would make his debut in a Chinese FA Cup game on 19 September 2020 against former club Shanghai SIPG in a 3–2 defeat.

== Style of play ==
Chen is a noted free-kick taker.

== Career statistics ==
As of 1 August 2025.

Appearances and goals by club, season and competition
Club	Season	League			Cup (Note: Includes Chinese FA Cup)		Other		Total	
Club	Season	Division	Apps	Goals	Apps	Goals	Apps	Goals	Apps	Goals
Chongqing Lifan	2020	Chinese Super League	1	0	1	0	0	0	2	0
Chongqing Lifan	2021	Chinese Super League	0	0	0	0	0	0	0	0
Chongqing Lifan	2022	Chinese Super League	0	0	0	0	0	0	0	0
Chongqing Lifan	Total		1	0	1	0	0	0	2	0
Shanxi Longjin (loan)	2021	China League Two	28	6	0	0	0	0	28	6
Quanzhou Yassin (loan)	2022	China League Two	14	0	0	0	0	0	14	0
Chongqing Chunlei	2024	Chinese Champions League	3	0	5	1	0	0	8	1
Chongqing Chunlei	2025	Chinese Champions League	2	0	4	0	0	0	6	0
Chongqing Chunlei	Total		5	0	9	1	0	0	14	1
Career total			48	6	10	1	0	0	58	6
