= Jin Rui =

Chinese association football player

Personal information
- Date of birth: 25 June 1998 (age 28)
- Place of birth: Quzhou, Zhejiang, China
- Height: 1.76 m (5 ft 9 in)
- Position: Midfielder

Team information
- Current team: Quanzhou Yassin
- Number: 21

Youth career
- –2018: Zhejiang Professional

Senior career*
Years	Team	Apps	(Gls)
2018	Zhejiang Professional	0	(0)
2018	→ Fujian Tianxin (loan)	24	(1)
2019–2020	Fujian Tianxin	28	(2)
2020–2021	Zhejiang Professional	2	(0)
2022-	Quanzhou Yassin	14	(0)
- * Club domestic league appearances and goals as of 14:01, 12 December 2022 (UTC)

Jin Rui (Chinese: 金锐; born 25 June 1998) is a Chinese footballer currently playing as a midfielder for Quanzhou Yassin.

== Club career ==
In 2018 Jin Haoxiang would be promoted to the senior team of Zhejiang before he would be loaned out to third tier club Fujian Tianxin to gain more playing time. The move would become permanent the following season until on 3 February 2020, the club was disqualified for the 2020 China League Two season after they failed to submit the salary and bonus confirmation form. Jin returned to Zhejiang as he would be a squad player as the club gained promotion to the top tier at the end of the 2021 campaign. Jin was allowed to join third tier club Quanzhou Yassin for the start of the 2022 China League Two campaign.

== Career statistics ==
As of 12 December 2022.

Club	Season	League			Cup		Continental		Other		Total	
Club	Season	Division	Apps	Goals	Apps	Goals	Apps	Goals	Apps	Goals	Apps	Goals
Zhejiang Professional	2018	China League One	0	0	0	0	–		–		0	0
Fujian Tianxin (loan)	2018	China League Two	22	1	1	0	–		2 (Note: Appearances in the China League Two playoffs)	0	25	1
Fujian Tianxin	2019	China League Two	27	2	1	0	–		1	0	29	2
Fujian Tianxin	Total		59	3	2	0	0	0	3	0	64	3
Zhejiang Professional	2020	China League One	0	0	0	0	–		0 (Note: Appearance(s) in CSL Relegation play-offs)	0	0	0
Zhejiang Professional	2021	China League One	2	0	0	0	–		0	0	2	0
Zhejiang Professional	Total		2	0	0	0	0	0	0	0	2	0
Quanzhou Yassin	2022	China League Two	14	0	0	0	–		–		14	0
Career total			75	3	2	0	0	0	3	0	80	3
