= Jinjiang Football Training Center =

Football stadium in Fujian, China

- 晋江市足球训练中心
- Football Park (足球公园)
- Location: Zenglin Community, Lingyuan Street, Jinjiang, Quanzhou, Fujian, China
- Owner: Jinjiang Municipal Government
- Operator: Jinjiang Fresh Sports Development Co., Ltd.
- Capacity: 8,000
- Surface: Natural grass (main field), Artificial turf (training fields)

Construction
- Opened: October 2019
- Cost: 260 million RMB

The Jinjiang Football Training Center (Chinese: 晋江市足球训练中心), is a professional football stadium located in Jinjiang, Quanzhou, Fujian Province, China. Opened in October 2019, it was the first professional football stadium in Fujian Province and the sixth in China. The stadium has a capacity of 8,000 spectators and serves as the home venue for Quanzhou Yassin F.C., which competes in China League Two.

== Construction and facilities ==
The stadium occupies a total area of approximately 87,000 square meters with a total investment of 260 million RMB. Construction began in July 2018 and was completed in 14 months. The facility includes an 11-a-side natural grass competition field, an 11-a-side artificial turf training field, and a 7-a-side artificial turf training field. The venue features 8,000 spectator seats without a running track, providing a close viewing experience typical of professional football stadiums.

Additional facilities include a 1.2-kilometer fitness trail, a 1,500-square-meter youth leisure activity area, a 1,500-square-meter public fitness area, and 500 parking spaces. The stadium design incorporates local architectural elements, with spectator stands positioned close to the pitch to enhance atmosphere.

== Major events ==
=== FISU University World Cup Football ===
The stadium served as the primary venue for the 2019 FISU University World Cup Football, hosting the opening and closing ceremonies as well as multiple matches. In October 2023, it again hosted the opening ceremony, finals, and closing ceremony of the 2023 FISU University World Cup Football. The 2023 tournament featured 20 university teams from 16 countries and regions, with 46 matches held across six venues in Jinjiang.

=== Chinese professional leagues ===
In October 2022, the Chinese Football Association designated Jinjiang as a neutral venue for the Chinese Super League, with the stadium hosting matches for Shanghai Shenhua F.C. and Shanghai Port F.C. The stadium has been the home ground for Quanzhou Yassin F.C. (formerly Fujian Tianxin) in China League Two since 2019.

== Operations and management ==
The stadium is operated by Jinjiang Fresh Sports Development Co., Ltd., a subsidiary of Jinjiang Cultural Tourism Group. The municipal government has invested over 4 billion RMB in sports infrastructure, including more than 30 venues such as the Jinjiang Football Training Center, to support the city's development as a "sports city".

== Transportation ==
The stadium is located at 2419 South Section, Shiji Avenue, with Jinjiang's convenient transportation network including Jinjiang International Airport and proximity to Xiamen Gaoqi International Airport.

== See also ==
- Quanzhou Yassin F.C.
