= Yuan Zheng =

Chinese association football player

Personal information
- Date of birth: 18 January 1997 (age 29)
- Place of birth: Nanjing, China
- Height: 1.86 m (6 ft 1 in)
- Position: Midfielder

Team information
- Current team: Gondomar
- Number: 23

Youth career
- Jiangsu FA
- 2017: Jiangsu Suning

Senior career*
Years	Team	Apps	(Gls)
2018–2020	Nanjing Shaye		
2020–2021	Gondomar B	12	(1)
2021–2022	Gondomar	9	(0)
2022	Hubei Istar	9	(1)
2022–2025	Suzhou Dongwu	31	(7)
2024	→ Wuxi Wugo (loan)	13	(0)
2025–2026	Nanjing Tehu		
2026	Lanzhou Longyuan Athletic	14	(0)
- * Club domestic league appearances and goals as of 14:01, 9 July 2026 (UTC)

Yuan Zheng (Chinese: 袁征; born 18 January 1997) is a Chinese footballer.

== Club career ==
Born and raised in Nanjing, Yuan played for the Jiangsu regional team, representing them at the 2017 National Games of China. At the conclusion of the tournament he briefly joined the academy of Jiangsu Suning, but decided to remain with Hohai University instead of immediately pursuing a professional career. He went on to join Nanjing Shaye, representing them in the Chinese Champions League and China League Two, before moving to Portugal in February 2020 to join Gondomar.

He was initially assigned to the club's B team, playing in the Divisão de Elite in Porto, though he would only make one appearance in his first season, as the league was curtailed due to the COVID-19 pandemic in Portugal. The following season he would go on to establish himself in the B team, while also occasionally playing in the Campeonato de Portugal for the first team.

On his return to China, he had a spell with China League Two club Hubei Istar, before joining China League One club Suzhou Dongwu in mid-2022. In 2024 he was loaned to Wuxi Wugo. He joined Lanzhou Longyuan Athletic for the 2026 season, but his contract was mutually terminated on 8 July 2026.

== Career statistics ==
=== Club ===
As of 15 January 2022.

Appearances and goals by club, season and competition
Club	Season	League			Cup (Note: Includes Chinese FA Cup and Taça de Portugal)		Other		Total	
Club	Season	Division	Apps	Goals	Apps	Goals	Apps	Goals	Apps	Goals
Nanjing Shaye	2018	Chinese Champions League	–		1	1	0	0	1	1
Nanjing Shaye	2019	China League Two	25	3	2	0	2 (Note: Appearances in the China League Two playoffs)	0	30	4
Nanjing Shaye	Total		25	3	3	1	2	0	30	4
Gondomar B	2019–20	Porto AF Divisão de Elite	1	0	–		0	0	1	0
Gondomar B	2020–21	Porto AF Divisão de Elite	11	1	–		0	0	11	1
Gondomar B	Total		12	1	0	0	0	0	12	1
Gondomar	2020–21	Campeonato de Portugal	2	0	0	0	0	0	2	0
Gondomar	2021–22	Campeonato de Portugal	7	0	0	0	0	0	7	0
Gondomar	Total		9	0	0	0	0	0	9	0
Hubei Istar	2022	China League Two	9	1	0	0	0	0	9	1
Suzhou Dongwu	2022	China League One	14	3	1	0	0	0	15	3
Suzhou Dongwu	2023	China League One	17	4	1	0	0	0	18	4
Suzhou Dongwu	2024	China League One	0	0	0	0	0	0	0	0
Suzhou Dongwu	2025	China League One	0	0	0	0	0	0	0	0
Suzhou Dongwu	Total		31	7	2	0	0	0	33	7
Wuxi Wugo (loan)	2024	China League One	13	0	3	0	0	0	16	0
Lanzhou Longyuan Athletic	2026	China League Two	14	0	3	0	0	0	17	0
Career total			113	12	11	1	2	0	126	13
