= Nanjing Shaye F.C. =

Chinese association football club

Nanjing Shaye 南京沙叶
- Full name: Nanjing Shaye Football Club 南京沙叶足球俱乐部
- Founded: ?
- League: China League Two
- 2019: League Two, 23rd

Nanjing Shaye Football Club (Chinese: 南京沙叶足球俱乐部) is a professional Chinese football club that currently participates in the China League Two. The team is based in Nanjing, Jiangsu.

== History ==
The club was originally a local amateur team named Nanjing Zhongshan Yuanlin from the city of Nanjing. In November 2014, Shaye Investment Management Co. Ltd. took over the club, which subsequently adopted its later widely known name Nanjing Shaye.

In 2016, the club formed an 11-a-side team to participate in the Nanjing Super League, and ended up winning the championship. Also competing in the China Amateur Football League for its first time in the same year, the club failed to make it out of the second round of group stages.

In 2017, the club signed to cooperate with the football section of Hohai University. After successfully defending its title as the champion of Nanjing amateur football, they participated in 2017 China Amateur Football League and advanced to the final round of 16, but they were eliminated by Anhui Hefei Guiguan and failed to advance further and gain access to China League Two.

In 2018, the club won their third Nanjing Super League title in a row, and made it to the final 8 of 2018 Chinese Champions League after beating Wuhan Shangwen 1–0 in the first round of the play-offs, without conceding a single goal in all previous stages. However, the club was eliminated by eventual champions Taizhou Yuanda in the quarter-finals. Despite this setback, they defeated Tianjin Ruihu 4–0 in the subsequent round, finally ensuring promotion and a spot in 2019 China League Two.

== Name changes ==
- –2014 Nanjing Zhongshan Yuanlin F.C. 南京中山园林
- 2014– Nanjing Shaye F.C. 南京沙叶

== Current squad ==
As of 12 July 2019

Note: Flags indicate national team as defined under FIFA eligibility rules; some limited exceptions apply. Players may hold more than one non-FIFA nationality.

| No. | Pos. | Nation | Player |
|---|---|---|---|
| 1 | GK | CHN | Chen Liang |
| 2 | DF | CHN | Qing Chen |
| 4 | DF | CHN | Liang Jinhu (on loan from Jiangsu Suning) |
| 6 | DF | CHN | Cao Yiwen |
| 7 | FW | CHN | A Xu |
| 8 | DF | CHN | Lu Maochun |
| 9 | MF | CHN | Wang Tao |
| 10 | FW | CHN | Bian Jun |
| 11 | DF | CHN | Liu Huan |
| 13 | DF | CHN | Yuan Zheng |
| 15 | MF | CHN | Zhang Bo |
| 16 | MF | CHN | Wu Xiangru |
| 17 | FW | CHN | Wen Xiang |
| 18 | DF | CHN | Sun Hong |

| No. | Pos. | Nation | Player |
|---|---|---|---|
| 19 | DF | CHN | Tian Rui |
| 20 | DF | CHN | Wu Chao |
| 22 | GK | CHN | Wang Yi |
| 23 | GK | CHN | Shen Taolin |
| 27 | FW | CHN | Guo Zihao |
| 28 | MF | CHN | Wang Teng |
| 33 | MF | CHN | Zhang Sheng |
| 35 | DF | CHN | Zhang Zhihao |
| 36 | MF | CHN | Guo Haoran |
| 37 | FW | CHN | Lin Shaoyun |
| 38 | GK | CHN | Shen Boyi |
| 39 | DF | CHN | Xiao Zedao |
| 41 | MF | CHN | Chen Yeyu |

=== Reserve squad ===
Note: Flags indicate national team as defined under FIFA eligibility rules; some limited exceptions apply. Players may hold more than one non-FIFA nationality.

| No. | Pos. | Nation | Player |
|---|---|---|---|
| 40 | DF | CHN | Liu Kai |
| — | GK | CHN | Jiang Tao |

== Results ==
All-time league rankings

As of the end of 2019 season.

| Year | Div | Pld | W | D | L | GF | GA | GD | Pts | Pos. | FA Cup | Super Cup | AFC | Att./G | Stadium |
|---|---|---|---|---|---|---|---|---|---|---|---|---|---|---|---|
| 2016 | 4 | | | | | | | | | GS2 | DNQ | DNQ | DNQ | | |
| 2017 | 4 | | | | | | | | | 13 | DNQ | DNQ | DNQ | | |
| 2018 | 4 | | | | | | | | | 6 | R2 | DNQ | DNQ | | |
| 2019 | 3 | 30 | 7 | 11 | 12 | 24 | 34 | −10 | 32 ^{1} | 23 | R3 | DNQ | DNQ | | Nanjing Youth Olympic Sports Park |

- ^1 In group stage.

Key

| | China top division |
| | China second division |
| | China third division |
| | China fourth division |
| W | Winners |
| RU | Runners-up |
| 3 | Third place |
| | Relegated |

- Pld = Played
- W = Games won
- D = Games drawn
- L = Games lost
- F = Goals for
- A = Goals against
- Pts = Points
- Pos = Final position
- DNQ = Did not qualify
- DNE = Did not enter
- NH = Not Held
- WD = Withdrawal
- – = Does Not Exist
- R1 = Round 1
- R2 = Round 2
- R3 = Round 3
- R4 = Round 4
- F = Final
- SF = Semi-finals
- QF = Quarter-finals
- R16 = Round of 16
- Group = Group stage
- GS2 = Second Group stage
- QR1 = First Qualifying Round
- QR2 = Second Qualifying Round
- QR3 = Third Qualifying Round
