= Liang Jinhu =

Chinese footballer

Liang Jinhu 梁金虎
Personal information
- Full name: Liang Jinhu
- Date of birth: 18 January 1997 (age 29)
- Place of birth: Nanjing, Jiangsu, China
- Height: 1.84 m (6 ft 1/2 in)
- Position: Defender

Youth career
- Jiangsu Youth
- 2016–2017: Jiangsu Suning

Senior career*
Years	Team	Apps	(Gls)
2018–2020	Jiangsu Suning	1	(0)
2019	→ Nanjing Shaye (loan)	25	(2)
2021–2025	Wuxi Wugo	95	(2)
- * Club domestic league appearances and goals as of 8 September 2024

Liang Jinhu (Chinese: 梁金虎; pinyin: Liáng Jīnhǔ; born 18 January 1997) is a Chinese footballer who currently plays as a defender.

== Club career ==
Liang Jinhu was promoted to Chinese Super League side Jiangsu Suning's first team squad by Fabio Capello in 2018. On 8 July 2018, he made his senior debut in a 0–0 home draw against Guangzhou R&F, replacing Ji Xiang in the stoppage time. He made his league debut on 5 August 2018 in a 3–1 home win over Guizhou Hengfeng, also came from substitution in the stoppage time for Wu Xi. In February 2019, Liang was loaned to League Two newcomer Nanjing Shaye for the 2019 season.

== Career statistics ==
As of 8 September 2024.

Appearances and goals by club, season and competition
Club	Season	League			National Cup		Continental		Other		Total	
Club	Season	Division	Apps	Goals	Apps	Goals	Apps	Goals	Apps	Goals	Apps	Goals
Jiangsu Suning	2018	Chinese Super League	1	0	1	0	-		-		2	0
Nanjing Shaye (loan)	2019	China League Two	25	2	2	0	-		-		27	2
Wuxi Wugo	2021	China League Two	19	1	2	0	–		–		21	0
Wuxi Wugo	2022	China League Two	13	0	–		–		–		13	0
Wuxi Wugo	2023	China League One	26	0	1	0	–		–		27	0
Wuxi Wugo	2024	China League One	10	0	3	0	–		–		13	0
Wuxi Wugo	Total		68	1	6	0	0	0	0	0	76	1
Total			94	3	9	0	0	0	0	0	103	3
