= Zhang Bo (footballer) =

Chinese footballer

Zhang Bo 张波
Personal information
- Date of birth: 27 June 1985 (age 41)
- Place of birth: Xuzhou, Jiangsu, China
- Height: 1.83 m (6 ft 0 in)
- Position: Midfielder

Team information
- Current team: Nanjing Shaye
- Number: 15

Youth career
- 2005: Jiangsu Sainty

Senior career*
Years	Team	Apps	(Gls)
2006–2011	Jiangsu Sainty	42	(0)
2009	Chongqing Lifan (loan)	3	(0)
2012–2014	Chengdu Tiancheng	45	(0)
2015–2016	Tianjin Locomotive	35	(1)
2017–2018	Suzhou Dongwu	45	(2)
2019	Nanjing Shaye	19	(1)
2020–	Nanjing City F.C.	9	(1)
- * Club domestic league appearances and goals as of 31 December 2020

Zhang Bo (Chinese: 张波; born 27 June 1985) is a Chinese football player who currently plays for China League One side Nanjing City F.C.

== Club career ==
Zhang Bo started his professional footballer career with the Jiangsu Sainty youth team before being promoted to their senior squad in the 2006 China League One season. He would go on to part of the team that won the 2008 China League One division and promotion into the top tier of Chinese football. He would eventually make his Chinese Super League debut for Jiangsu on 24 October 2009 in a game against Shandong Luneng Taishan. He would also be loaned out to another top tier club in Chongqing Lifan during the season.

In January 2012, Zhang transferred to second tier side Chengdu Tiancheng. Initially Zhang Bo established himself as regular within the team, however by the 2014 China League One season the club experienced relegation and were dissolved due to wage arrears.

In March 2015, Zhang transferred to China League Two side Tianjin Locomotive. In February 2019, Zhang transferred to League Two newcomer Nanjing Shaye.

== Career statistics ==
Statistics accurate as of match played 31 December 2020.

Appearances and goals by club, season and competition
Club	Season	League			National Cup		Continental		Other		Total	
Club	Season	Division	Apps	Goals	Apps	Goals	Apps	Goals	Apps	Goals	Apps	Goals
Jiangsu Sainty	2006	China League One	18	0	0	0	-		-		18	0
Jiangsu Sainty	2007	China League One	19	0	-		-		-		19	0
Jiangsu Sainty	2008	China League One	2	0	-		-		-		2	0
Jiangsu Sainty	2009	Chinese Super League	2	0	-		-		-		2	0
Jiangsu Sainty	2010	Chinese Super League	0	0	-		-		-		0	0
Jiangsu Sainty	2011	Chinese Super League	1	0	0	0	-		-		1	0
Jiangsu Sainty	Total		42	0	0	0	0	0	0	0	42	0
Chongqing Lifan (loan)	2009	Chinese Super League	3	0	-		-		-		3	0
Chengdu Tiancheng	2012	China League One	22	0	2	0	-		-		24	0
Chengdu Tiancheng	2013	China League One	16	0	1	0	-		-		17	0
Chengdu Tiancheng	2014	China League One	7	0	1	0	-		-		8	0
Chengdu Tiancheng	Total		45	0	4	0	0	0	0	0	49	0
Tianjin Locomotive	2015	China League Two	16	1	2	0	-		-		18	0
Tianjin Locomotive	2016	China League Two	19	0	1	0	-		-		20	0
Tianjin Locomotive	Total		35	1	3	0	0	0	0	0	38	1
Suzhou Dongwu	2017	China League Two	22	0	3	0	-		-		25	0
Suzhou Dongwu	2018	China League Two	23	2	3	0	-		-		26	2
Suzhou Dongwu	Total		45	2	6	0	0	0	0	0	51	2
Nanjing Shaye	2019	China League Two	19	1	2	0	-		-		21	1
Nanjing City F.C.	2020	China League Two	9	1	-		-		-		9	1
Career total			189	4	15	0	0	0	0	0	204	4

== Honours ==
=== Club ===
Jiangsu Sainty

- China League One: 2008
