= Duan Jieyi =

Chinese footballer

Duan Jieyi 段杰毅
Personal information
- Full name: Duan Jieyi
- Date of birth: 17 September 1990 (age 36)
- Place of birth: Shenyang, Liaoning, China
- Height: 1.76 m (5 ft 9 in)
- Position: Defender

Team information
- Current team: Nei Mongol Zhongyou
- Number: 7

Senior career*
Years	Team	Apps	(Gls)
2009–2013	Shenyang Dongjin	11	(0)
2014–2016	Shanghai Shenxin	2	(0)
2017–	Nei Mongol Zhongyou	46	(3)
- * Club domestic league appearances and goals as of 31 December 2019

Duan Jieyi (Chinese: 段杰毅; pinyin: Duàn Jiéyì; born 17 September 1990 in Shenyang, Liaoning) is a Chinese footballer who currently plays for Nei Mongol Zhongyou in the China League One.

== Club career ==
Duan Jieyi started his professional football career in 2009 when he joined Shenyang Dongjin for the 2009 China League One campaign. In February 2014, he transferred to Chinese Super League club Shanghai Shenxin . On 18 October 2015, Duan made his debut for Shanghai Shenxin in the 2015 Chinese Super League against Chongqing Lifan, coming on as a substitute for Yang Jiawei in the 81st minute. In February 2017, Duan transferred to fellow League One side Nei Mongol Zhongyou.

== Career statistics ==
Statistics accurate as of match played 31 December 2019.

Appearances and goals by club, season and competition
Club	Season	League			National Cup		Continental		Other		Total	
Club	Season	Division	Apps	Goals	Apps	Goals	Apps	Goals	Apps	Goals	Apps	Goals
Shenyang Dongjin	2009	China League One	0	0	-		-		-		0	0
Shenyang Dongjin	2010	China League One	1	0	-		-		-		1	0
Shenyang Dongjin	2011	China League One	2	0	1	0	-		-		3	0
Shenyang Dongjin	2012	China League One	0	0	0	0	-		-		0	0
Shenyang Dongjin	2013	China League Two	8	0	1	0	-		-		9	0
Shenyang Dongjin	Total		11	0	2	0	0	0	0	0	13	0
Shanghai Shenxin	2014	Chinese Super League	0	0	2	0	-		-		2	0
Shanghai Shenxin	2015	Chinese Super League	2	0	0	0	-		-		2	0
Shanghai Shenxin	2016	China League One	0	0	2	0	-		-		2	0
Shanghai Shenxin	Total		2	0	4	0	0	0	0	0	6	0
Nei Mongol Zhongyou	2017	China League One	6	0	1	0	-		-		7	0
Nei Mongol Zhongyou	2018	China League One	15	3	1	0	-		-		16	3
Nei Mongol Zhongyou	2019	China League One	25	0	1	0	-		-		26	3
Nei Mongol Zhongyou	Total		46	3	3	0	0	0	0	0	49	3
Career total			59	3	9	0	0	0	0	0	68	3
