= Li Chao (footballer) =

Chinese footballer

Li Chao 李超
Personal information
- Date of birth: 15 August 1987 (age 39)
- Place of birth: Tai'an, Shandong, China
- Height: 1.78 m (5 ft 10 in)
- Position: Defender

Youth career
- 1999–2000: Tai'an Sports School
- 2000–2001: Zibo Sports School
- 2001–2002: Beijing Guoan
- 2002–2005: Sichuan First City

Senior career*
Years	Team	Apps	(Gls)
2006–2010	Sichuan FC	?	(?)
2011–2016	Shijiazhuang Ever Bright	158	(10)
2017–2022	Wuhan Yangtze River	70	(0)
- * Club domestic league appearances and goals as of 31 December 2022

Li Chao (Chinese: 李超; pinyin: Lǐ Chāo; born 15 August 1987 in Tai'an) is a Chinese former football player who played as a defender.

== Club career ==
Li Chao received organized football training at Tai'an Sports School, Zibo Sports School, Beijing Guoan and Sichuan First City between 1999 and 2005. After Sichuan First City was dissolved in early 2006, he joined newly founded club Sichuan FC. Li played three seasons in China League Two and two seasons in China League One for Sichuan.

Li transferred to League Two club Fujian Smart Hero in early 2011. He followed the club as they moved to Shijiazhuang and he became the team captain in 2013. He played all 30 league matches in the 2014 season and captained the club to win promotion to the Chinese Super League. On 9 March 2015, Li made his Super League debut in the season's first match which Shijiazhuang lost to Guangzhou Evergrande 2–1.

On 1 January 2017, Li moved to League One side Wuhan Zall on a free transfer after Shijiazhuang were relegated to the second tier. He would make his debut on 11 March 2017 in a league game against Baoding Yingli ETS that ended in a 1-1 draw. He would go on to establish himself as a vital member of the team and he would win the division as well as gaining promotion at the end of the 2018 China League One campaign.

== Career statistics ==
Statistics accurate as of match played 31 December 2022.

Appearances and goals by club, season and competition
Club	Season	League			National Cup		Continental		Other		Total	
Club	Season	Division	Apps	Goals	Apps	Goals	Apps	Goals	Apps	Goals	Apps	Goals
Sichuan FC	2006	China League Two	?	?	-		-		-		?	?
Sichuan FC	2007	China League Two	?	?	-		-		-		?	?
Sichuan FC	2008	China League One	19	0	-		-		-		19	0
Sichuan FC	2009	China League One	17	1	-		-		-		17	1
Sichuan FC	2010	China League Two	?	?	-		-		-		?	?
Sichuan FC	Total		36	1	0	0	0	0	0	0	36	1
Shijiazhuang Ever Bright	2011	China League Two	26	3	-		-		-		26	3
Shijiazhuang Ever Bright	2012	China League One	24	3	0	0	-		-		24	3
Shijiazhuang Ever Bright	2013	China League One	27	0	2	0	-		-		29	0
Shijiazhuang Ever Bright	2014	China League One	30	2	0	0	-		-		30	2
Shijiazhuang Ever Bright	2015	Chinese Super League	27	2	0	0	-		-		27	2
Shijiazhuang Ever Bright	2016	Chinese Super League	24	0	1	0	-		-		25	0
Shijiazhuang Ever Bright	Total		158	10	3	0	0	0	0	0	161	10
Wuhan Zall	2017	China League One	29	0	0	0	-		-		29	0
Wuhan Zall	2018	China League One	17	0	2	0	-		-		19	0
Wuhan Zall	2019	Chinese Super League	6	0	1	0	-		-		7	0
Wuhan Zall	2020	Chinese Super League	2	0	5	0	-		1 (Note: Appearance(s) in CSL Relegation play-offs)	0	8	0
Wuhan Zall	2021	Chinese Super League	10	0	0	0	-		-		10	0
Wuhan Zall	2022	Chinese Super League	6	0	1	0	-		-		7	0
Wuhan Zall	Total		70	0	8	0	0	0	1	0	79	0
Career total			264	11	11	0	0	0	1	0	276	11

== Honours ==
=== Club ===
Wuhan Zall

- China League One: 2018
