= Lan Jingxuan =

Chinese association football player

Personal information
- Date of birth: 16 September 1999 (age 27)
- Height: 1.75 m (5 ft 9 in)
- Position: Defender

Team information
- Current team: Quanzhou Yassin

Youth career
- –2019: Tianjin TEDA

Senior career*
Years	Team	Apps	(Gls)
2019–2021	Tianjin TEDA	3	(0)
2022-	Quanzhou Yassin	0	(0)
- * Club domestic league appearances and goals as of 14:01, 3 May 2022 (UTC)

Lan Jingxuan (Chinese: 兰菁轩; born 16 September 1999) is a Chinese footballer who currently plays for China League Two club Quanzhou Yassin.

== Club career ==
Lan Jingxuan was promoted to the senior team of Tianjin TEDA within the 2019 Chinese Super League season and he would make his debut on 30 April 2019 in a Chinese FA Cup game against Zibo Cuju F.C. in a 4-1 victory.

== Career statistics ==
As of 31 December 2020.

Club	Season	League			Cup		Continental		Other		Total	
Club	Season	Division	Apps	Goals	Apps	Goals	Apps	Goals	Apps	Goals	Apps	Goals
Tianjin TEDA	2019	Chinese Super League	0	0	1	0	–		–		1	0
Tianjin TEDA	2020	Chinese Super League	1	0	1	0	–		–		2	0
Tianjin TEDA	Total		1	0	2	0	0	0	0	0	3	0
Career total			1	0	2	0	0	0	0	0	3	0
