= Zhang Wei (footballer, born January 1993) =

Chinese footballer

Zhang Wei 张卫
Personal information
- Full name: Zhang Wei
- Date of birth: 19 January 1993 (age 33)
- Place of birth: Nantong, Jiangsu, China
- Height: 1.96 m (6 ft 5 in)
- Position: Forward

Youth career
- Jiangsu Sainty

Senior career*
Years	Team	Apps	(Gls)
2011–2012	Jiangsu Youth	29	(1)
2014–2016	Jiangsu Suning	1	(0)
2016	→ Nantong Zhiyun (loan)	0	(0)
2016	→ Chengdu Qbao (loan)	6	(1)
2017–2018	Nantong Zhiyun	10	(1)
2019	Nanjing City		

International career
	China U22	4	(1)

Managerial career
- 2021: Jiangsu Zhongnan Codion Youth
- 2022–: Nantong Zhiyun U21
- * Club domestic league appearances and goals as of 4 November 2018

Zhang Wei (Chinese: 张卫; born 19 January 1993) is a Chinese football coach and former footballer.

== Club career ==
Zhang Wei started his football career with Jiangsu Sainty during the 2014 season after playing for Jiangsu Youth during the 2011 season and the 2012 season. He was diagnosed with heart disease and received surgery by the end of 2012. On 23 July 2014, Zhang made his debut for Jiangsu Sainty in the 2014 Chinese FA Cup against Lijiang Jiayunhao, coming on as a substitute for Sun Ke in the 80th minute. His Super League debut came on 26 October 2014 in the 2014 Chinese Super League against Shanghai East Asia, coming on as a substitute for Edinson Toloza in the 61st minute. On 16 February 2016, Zhang was loaned to China League Two side Nantong Zhiyun. On 22 June 2016, Zhang was loaned to China League Two side Chengdu Qbao until 31 December 2016. He made a permanent transfer to Nantong Zhiyun in March 2017.

== Career statistics ==
Statistics accurate as of match played 4 November 2018.

Club performance			League		Cup		Continental		Other		Total	
Season	Club	League	Apps	Goals	Apps	Goals	Apps	Goals	Apps	Goals	Apps	Goals
China PR			League		FA Cup		Asia		Others		Total	
2011	Jiangsu Youth	China League Two	12	1	-	-	-	-	-	-	12	1
2012	Jiangsu Youth	China League Two	17	0	-	-	-	-	-	-	17	0
2014	Jiangsu Sainty	Chinese Super League	1	0	1	0	-	-	-	-	2	0
2015	Jiangsu Sainty	Chinese Super League	0	0	0	0	-	-	-	-	0	0
2016	Chengdu Qbao	China League Two	6	1	0	0	-	-	-	-	6	1
2017	Nantong Zhiyun	China League Two	10	1	2	0	-	-	-	-	12	1
2018	Nantong Zhiyun	China League Two	0	0	0	0	-	-	-	-	0	0
Total	China PR		46	3	3	0	0	0	0	0	49	3
