= Quanzhou Yassin F.C. =

Chinese football club

Quanzhou Yassin 泉州亚新
- Full name: Quanzhou Yassin Football Club 泉州亚新足球俱乐部
- Founded: 4 April 2019; 7 years ago
- Ground: Jinjiang Football Training Center
- Capacity: 8,000
- Manager: Huang Yong
- League: Chinese Champions League
- 2025: China League Two, 23rd of 24 (relegated)

Quanzhou Yassin Football Club (simplified Chinese: 泉州亚新足球俱乐部; traditional Chinese: 泉州亞新足球俱樂部; pinyin: Quánzhōu Yàxīn Zúqiú Jùlèbù) is a Chinese professional football club based in Jinjiang, Fujian, that competes in the Chinese Champions League (CMCL), the fourth tier of Chinese football. Quanzhou Yassin plays its home matches at the Jinjiang Football Training Center, located within Jinjiang.

== History ==
Quanzhou Yassin logo used from 2021 to 2024

Quanzhou Addarmour F.C. was founded on 4 April 2019. The club participated in Chinese Champions League in 2020 and was promoted to China League Two. In 2021, the club changed its name to Quanzhou Yassin F.C.

== Name history ==
- 2019–2020 Quanzhou Addarmour F.C. 泉州爱德马
- 2021– Quanzhou Yassin F.C. 泉州亚新

== Players ==
=== Current squad ===
As of 1 January 2023

Note: Flags indicate national team as defined under FIFA eligibility rules; some limited exceptions apply. Players may hold more than one non-FIFA nationality.

No.	Pos.	Nation	Player
1	GK	CHN	Hu Haoran
10	FW	CHN	Li Diantong
12	MF	CHN	Chen Linqi
13	GK	CHN	Zhang Xunwei
14	FW	CHN	A Xu
15	DF	CHN	Yu Miao
19	MF	CHN	Lan Jingxuan
20	DF	CHN	Peng Rui
21	MF	CHN	Jin Rui
22	GK	CHN	Gao Yuqin
42	FW	CHN	Xu Jiasen

No.	Pos.	Nation	Player
43	MF	CHN	Guo Donghao
44	MF	CHN	Wu Jiahao
45	MF	CHN	Zhao Yanbo
46	DF	CHN	He Wen
47	MF	CHN	Ji Longgang
48	DF	CHN	Ye Huangxin
49	FW	CHN	Dong Xu
50	MF	CHN	Tang Junbin
51	MF	CHN	Huo Longfei
53	MF	CHN	Wang Xinzhe
