= Guan Zhen =

Chinese footballer (born 1985)

Guan Zhen 关震
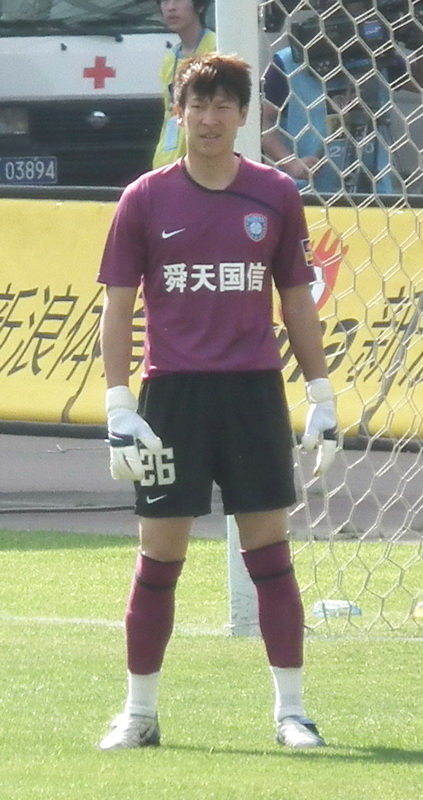

Personal information
- Full name: Guan Zhen
- Date of birth: February 6, 1985 (age 41)
- Place of birth: Tianjin, China
- Height: 1.85 m (6 ft 1 in)
- Position: Goalkeeper

Team information
- Current team: Shaanxi Union (goalkeeping coach)

Youth career
- 1998–2000: Tianjin Huochetou
- 2000–2002: Shandong Luneng Taishan

Senior career*
Years	Team	Apps	(Gls)
2003–2007	Shandong Luneng Taishan	4	(0)
2006	→ Chengdu Blades (loan)	1	(0)
2008–2014	Jiangsu Sainty	89	(0)
2015–2016	Shijiazhuang Ever Bright	52	(2)
2017–2020	Shenzhen FC	49	(0)
Total		195	(2)

International career^{‡}
2005	China U-20		
2006–2007	China U-23		
2009–2011	China	2	(0)

Managerial career
- 2020–2022: Shenzhen FC (goalkeeping)
- 2022: Shenzhen FC (caretaker)
- 2023–2024: Shenzhen FC (goalkeeping)
- 2024–2025: China Women U-20 (assistant)
- 2026: Shenzhen Peng City (goalkeeping)
- 2026–: Shaanxi Union (goalkeeping)
Medal record
Representing China
Men's football
EAFF Championship
Gold medal – first place	2010 Japan	Team
AFC Youth Championship
Silver medal – second place	2004 َ Malaysia	Team
- * Club domestic league appearances and goals as of 31 December 2020 ‡ National team caps and goals as of 31 December 2019

Guan Zhen (simplified Chinese: 关震; traditional Chinese: 關震; pinyin: Guān Zhèn; born February 6, 1985, in Tianjin) is a Chinese football coach and former professional footballer who played as a goalkeeper.

== Club career ==
=== Shandong Luneng Taishan ===
Guan would make his senior club debut on March 16, 2003, for Shandong Luneng Taishan in a league game versus Yunnan Hongta. His appearance was to make him the youngest goalkeeper to ever appear in the top tier in the Chinese league system, however this record was later broken by Wang Dalei. After his debut he would play understudy to Zong Lei and Deng Xiaofei for several seasons, however Shandong Luneng would bring in Li Leilei in the 2006 league season and Guan was loaned out to Chengdu F.C.

=== Chengdu Wuniu ===
Guan would join second tier club Chengdu F.C. on loan in 2006 to gain more playing time but failed to make it as their first choice goalkeeper. He would return to Shandong Luneng where he would once more be used as a third choice goalkeeper. Unable to improve upon his position Shandong Luneng Taishan were willing to let Guan leave at the end of the 2007 league season.

=== Jiangsu Sainty ===
He transferred to second tier club Jiangsu Sainty at the beginning of the 2008 league season and was immediately placed as their first-choice goalkeeper within the team. He played extremely well enough to immediately help the club in their push for promotion to the Chinese Super League by aiding them to win the 2008 Chinese League One title. The following season Guan's former team mate Deng Xiaofei was brought into the club and for a short period replaced Guan as the team's first choice goalkeeper, however he would eventually go on to win back his place within the team and help establish Jiangsu within the top tier.

=== Shijiazhuang Ever Bright ===
In January 2015, Guan transferred to fellow Chinese Super League side Shijiazhuang Ever Bright.

Guan scored his first ever goal in his 100th top-tier match on May 8, 2016, converting a penalty in a 2–1 loss against Shanghai SIPG. Yasen Petrov, manager of Shijiazhuang, expressed that Guan would be the first penalty kicker of the club until he missed. He scored his second penalty on May 22, 2016, in a 1–1 home draw against Beijing Guoan. On June 19, 2016, Guan missed a penalty in a 1–0 victory against Henan Jianye before his teammate Rúben Micael took the other penalty of the match.

=== Shenzhen FC ===
On February 8, 2017, Guan transferred to China League One side Shenzhen FC He would make his debut appearance on 12 March 2017 against Dalian Transcendence in a league game that ended in a 6–0 victory. He would establish himself as a regular within the team and go on to gain promotion with the club at the end of the 2018 China League One campaign.

Guan Zhen retired in December 2020, and joined the backroom staff as an assistant goalkeeping coach.

== International career ==
Guan was the first choice keeper for the Chinese U-20 team before the 2005 FIFA World Youth Championship that was managed by Eckhard Krautzun, however he was ruled out after suffering an injury before the tournament by his own teammate Wang Yongpo. He would go on to be promoted to the Chinese U-23 and was part of the squad that played in the Football at the 2006 Asian Games, however it was only after an impressive start to the 2009 Chinese Super League season with Jiangsu Sainty before Guan would be called up into Gao Hongbo's squad to face Kyrgyzstan in a 3–0 win on July 25, 2009, where he came on as a substitute for Zeng Cheng. His performance was good enough for him to be tried out in the 2010 East Asian Football Championship and then later included in the squad for the 2011 AFC Asian Cup.

== Career statistics ==
Statistics accurate as of match played 31 December 2020.

Appearances and goals by club, season and competition
Club	Season	League			National Cup		League Cup		Continental		Other		Total	
Club	Season	Division	Apps	Goals	Apps	Goals	Apps	Goals	Apps	Goals	Apps	Goals	Apps	Goals
Shandong Luneng Taishan	2003	Chinese Jia-A League	4	0	0	0	-		-		-		4	0
Shandong Luneng Taishan	2004	Chinese Super League	0	0	0	0		0	-		-		0	0
Shandong Luneng Taishan	2005	Chinese Super League	0	0	0	0		0	0	0	-		0	0
Shandong Luneng Taishan	Total		4	0	0	0	0	0	0	0	0	0	0	0
Chengdu F.C. (Loan)	2006	China League One	1	0	0	0	-		-		-		1	0
Shandong Luneng Taishan	2007	Chinese Super League	0	0	-		-		0	0	0 (Note: Appearances in A3 Champions Cup)	0	0	0
Jiangsu Sainty	2008	China League One	24	0	-		-		-		-		24	0
Jiangsu Sainty	2009	Chinese Super League	15	0	-		-		-		-		15	0
Jiangsu Sainty	2010	Chinese Super League	17	0	-		-		-		-		17	0
Jiangsu Sainty	2011	Chinese Super League	9	0	0	0	-		-		-		9	0
Jiangsu Sainty	2012	Chinese Super League	0	0	0	0	-		-		-		0	0
Jiangsu Sainty	2013	Chinese Super League	11	0	2	0	-		0	0	1 (Note: Appearances in Chinese FA Super Cup)	0	13	0
Jiangsu Sainty	2014	Chinese Super League	13	0	0	0	-		-		-		13	0
Jiangsu Sainty	Total		89	0	2	0	0	0	0	0	1	0	92	0
Shijiazhuang Ever Bright	2015	Chinese Super League	23	0	1	0	-		-		-		24	0
Shijiazhuang Ever Bright	2016	Chinese Super League	29	2	0	0	-		-		-		29	2
Shijiazhuang Ever Bright	Total		52	2	1	0	0	0	0	0	0	0	53	2
Shenzhen F.C.	2017	China League One	26	0	0	0	-		-		-		26	0
Shenzhen F.C.	2018	China League One	22	0	0	0	-		-		-		22	0
Shenzhen F.C.	2019	Chinese Super League	0	0	1	0	-		-		-		1	0
Shenzhen F.C.	2020	Chinese Super League	0	0	0	0	-		-		-		0	0
Shenzhen F.C.	Total		48	0	1	0	0	0	0	0	0	0	49	0
Career total			194	2	4	0	0	0	0	0	1	0	199	2

== Honours ==
=== Club ===
Shandong Luneng Taishan

- Chinese FA Cup: 2004

Jiangsu Sainty

- China League One: 2008
- Chinese FA Super Cup: 2013

=== Country ===
China PR national football team

- East Asian Football Championship: 2010

== See also ==
- List of goalscoring goalkeepers
