= Yang Wenji =

Chinese footballer

Yang Wenji 杨文吉
Personal information
- Date of birth: 24 September 1993 (age 33)
- Place of birth: Wuhan, Hubei, China
- Height: 1.88 m (6 ft 2 in)
- Positions: Centre-back; left-back

Senior career*
Years	Team	Apps	(Gls)
2011–2016	Hebei China Fortune	13	(0)
2017–2021	Meizhou Hakka	98	(2)
2022	Jiangxi Beidamen	29	(3)
2023–2024	Wuxi Wugo	26	(1)
Total		171	(6)
- * Club domestic league appearances and goals as of 8 September 2024

Yang Wenji (Chinese: 杨文吉; pinyin: Yáng Wúnjí; born 24 September 1993) is a Chinese footballer.

On 10 September 2024, Chinese Football Association announced that Yang was banned from football-related activities for lifetime for involving in match-fixing.

== Club career ==
Yang Wenji joined the senior team of China League Two club Hebei Zhongji in the 2011 league campaign. He would often been used as a substitute player in the club, however he was part of the Hebei team that gained promotion to China League One at the end of the 2013 campaign. He made 13 appearances in the 2015 season as Hebei finished runners-up of the league and promotion to the Chinese Super League.

On 11 January 2017, Yang moved to League One side Meizhou Hakka. He made his debut in a league game on 10 March 2018 against Shijiazhuang Ever Bright in a 2-1 defeat. He would then go on to be a member of the team that gained promotion to the top tier after coming second within the division at the end of the 2021 China League One campaign. On 27 April 2022, Yang would join another second-tier club in Jiangxi Beidamen and would go on to make his debut in a league game on 10 June 2022 against Nanjing City in a 1-1 draw.

== Career statistics ==
As of 8 September 2024.

Club	Season	League			National Cup		Continental		Other		Total	
Club	Season	Division	Apps	Goals	Apps	Goals	Apps	Goals	Apps	Goals	Apps	Goals
Hebei China Fortune	2011	China League Two	3	0	-		-		-		3	0
Hebei China Fortune	2012	China League Two	2	0	2	0	-		-		4	0
Hebei China Fortune	2013	China League Two	0	0	0	0	-		-		0	0
Hebei China Fortune	2014	China League One	0	0	0	0	-		-		0	0
Hebei China Fortune	2015	China League One	13	0	1	0	-		-		14	0
Hebei China Fortune	2016	Chinese Super League	0	0	4	0	-		-		4	0
Hebei China Fortune	Total		18	0	7	0	0	0	0	0	25	0
Meizhou Hakka	2017	China League One	29	0	0	0	-		-		29	0
Meizhou Hakka	2018	China League One	28	0	0	0	-		-		28	0
Meizhou Hakka	2019	China League One	27	1	0	0	-		-		27	1
Meizhou Hakka	2020	China League One	9	1	1	0	-		-		10	1
Meizhou Hakka	2021	China League One	5	0	1	0	-		-		6	0
Meizhou Hakka	Total		98	2	2	0	0	0	0	0	100	2
Jiangxi Beidamen	2022	China League One	29	3	1	0	-		-		30	3
Wuxi Wugo	2023	China League One	4	1	-		-		-		30	3
Wuxi Wugo	2024	China League One	22	0	0	0	-		-		22	0
Wuxi Wugo	Total		26	1	0	0	0	0	0	0	26	1
Career total			171	6	10	0	0	0	0	0	181	6
