= Jia Tianzi =

Chinese footballer

Jia Tianzi 贾天子
Personal information
- Date of birth: 28 February 1994 (age 32)
- Place of birth: Chengdu, Sichuan, China
- Height: 1.70 m (5 ft 7 in)
- Position: Midfielder

Youth career
- 2002–2008: Mingyu Football School
- 2008–2010: Sichuan Youth
- 2011–2012: Casa Pia
- 2012: Real Massamá

Senior career*
Years	Team	Apps	(Gls)
2011–2012	Sichuan FC	21	(3)
2013	Amora	1	(1)
2013–2014	Covilhã	1	(0)
2014–2016	Shanghai Shenxin	19	(0)
2017–2021	Shanghai SIPG	0	(0)
- * Club domestic league appearances and goals as of 31 December 2023

Jia Tianzi (Chinese: 贾天子; pinyin: Jiǎ Tiānzǐ; born 28 February 1994) is a Chinese footballer who plays as a midfielder.

== Career ==
Jia was born in Chengdu. In 2011, he started his senior football career with China League Two club Sichuan FC. He went to Portugal following Chinese Football Association 500.com Stars Project in the end of 2011. He joined Casa Pia youth team system and returned to Sichuan FC in June 2012. After scoring three goals in three matches of the 2012 season, he transferred to another Portuguese club Real Sport Clube. Jia joined Terceira Divisão side Amora in January 2013. On 3 March 2013, he made his senior debut and scored first goal at Portugal in a 2–1 away defeat against Lourinhanense. He made a free transfer to Segunda Liga side S.C. Covilhã in September 2013. On 8 December 2013, he made his debut for Covilhã in a league match against C.D. Aves where he coming on as a substitute for Inters Gui in the 87th minute.

Jia joined Chinese Super League side Shanghai Shenxin in July 2014. He made his debut for Shanghai Shenxin on 6 August 2014 in the 2014 Chinese FA Cup against Shanghai Shenhua, coming on for Hou Junjie in the 58th minute. He made his Super League debut three days later on 9 August 2014 in a 1–0 home defeat against Guizhou Renhe, coming on as a substitute for Xu Wen in the 62nd minute.

On 5 February 2017, Jia moved to Super League side Shanghai SIPG.

== Career statistics ==
As of match played 31 December 2020

Appearances and goals by club, season and competition
Club	Season	League			National cup		League cup		Continental		Total	
Club	Season	Division	Apps	Goals	Apps	Goals	Apps	Goals	Apps	Goals	Apps	Goals
Sichuan FC	2011	China League Two	18	0	–		–		–		18	0
Sichuan FC	2012	China League Two	3	3	–		–		–		3	3
Sichuan FC	Total		21	3	0	0	0	0	0	0	21	3
Amora	2012–13	Terceira Divisão	1	1	0	0	–		–		1	1
Covilhã	2013–14	Segunda Liga	1	0	0	0	1	0	–		2	0
Shanghai Shenxin	2014	Chinese Super League	2	0	1	0	–		–		3	0
Shanghai Shenxin	2015	Chinese Super League	14	0	1	0	–		–		15	0
Shanghai Shenxin	2016	China League One	3	0	1	0	–		–		4	0
Shanghai Shenxin	Total		19	0	3	0	0	0	0	0	22	0
Shanghai SIPG	2017	Chinese Super League	0	0	0	0	–		0	0	0	0
Career total			42	4	3	0	1	0	0	0	46	4
