= Wang Yi (footballer, born 1990) =

Chinese footballer

Wang Yi 王毅
Personal information
- Date of birth: 22 August 1990 (age 36)
- Place of birth: Dalian, Liaoning, China
- Height: 1.86 m (6 ft 1 in)
- Position: Goalkeeper

Team information
- Current team: Nanjing Shaye
- Number: 22

Senior career*
Years	Team	Apps	(Gls)
2008–2014	Chengdu Tiancheng	36	(0)
2008–2009	Sheffield United HK (loan)	8	(0)
2015–2016	Wuhan Zall	1	(0)
2017	Dalian Transcendence	2	(0)
2018	Chengdu Better City		
2019	Nanjing Shaye	3	(0)
2020–	Nanjing City	0	(0)
- * Club domestic league appearances and goals as of 31 December 2020

Wang Yi (Chinese: 王毅; born 22 August 1990 in Dalian) is a Chinese football player who currently plays for China League One side Nanjing City.

== Club career ==
In 2008, Wang Yi started his professional footballer career with Chengdu Tiancheng in the Chinese Super League. To gain some playing time he was loaned out to the clubs satellite team, Sheffield United HK where he made his debut in a league game against Convoy Sun Hei on 10 September 2008 in a 0–0 draw. On his return he would be promoted to the clubs first choice goalkeeper by the new Head coach Lawrie McKinna halfway through the 2011 Chinese Super League season to help the club avoid relegation. Wang would make his league debut for Chengdu on 13 August 2011 in a league game against Tianjin Teda that ended in a 1–1 draw. While there was an upswing in results, Wang was still unable to help the club avoid relegation at the end season.

In the 2012 China League One season Zhang Chen was brought in to compete for the first choice goalkeeping position. Wang remained with the club until the end of the 2014 China League One season the club experienced another relegation and were dissolved due to wage arrears. In February 2015, Wang transferred to China League One side Wuhan Zall. After two season, on 1 January 2017, Wang was signed by his hometown club Dalian Transcendence.

== Career statistics ==
Statistics accurate as of match played 31 December 2020.

Appearances and goals by club, season and competition
Club	Season	League			National Cup		League Cup		Other		Total	
Club	Season	Division	Apps	Goals	Apps	Goals	Apps	Goals	Apps	Goals	Apps	Goals
Chengdu Tiancheng	2008	Chinese Super League	0	0	-		-		-		0	0
Chengdu Tiancheng	2009	Chinese Super League	0	0	-		-		-		0	0
Chengdu Tiancheng	2010	China League One	0	0	-		-		-		0	0
Chengdu Tiancheng	2011	Chinese Super League	12	0	0	0	-		-		12	0
Chengdu Tiancheng	2012	China League One	2	0	3	0	-		-		5	0
Chengdu Tiancheng	2013	China League One	22	0	1	0	-		-		23	0
Chengdu Tiancheng	2014	China League One	3	0	0	0	-		-		3	0
Chengdu Tiancheng	Total		39	0	4	0	0	0	0	0	43	0
Sheffield United HK (loan)	2008–09	HK First Division League	8	0	0	0	1	0	0 (Note: Appearances in Hong Kong Senior Challenge Shield)	0	9	0
Wuhan Zall	2015	China League One	0	0	1	0	-		-		1	0
Wuhan Zall	2016	China League One	1	0	0	0	-		-		1	0
Wuhan Zall	Total		1	0	1	0	0	0	0	0	2	0
Dalian Transcendence	2017	China League One	2	0	0	0	-		-		2	0
Chengdu Better City	2018	Chinese Champions League	-		-		-		-		-	-
Nanjing Shaye	2019	China League Two	3	0	0	0	-		-		3	0
Nanjing City	2020	China League Two	0	0	-		-		-		0	0
Career total			53	0	5	0	1	0	0	0	59	0
