= Tong Xiaoxing =

Chinese association football player

Personal information
- Date of birth: 7 January 1987 (age 39)
- Place of birth: Wuhan, Hubei
- Height: 1.75 m (5 ft 9 in)
- Positions: Midfielder; forward

Youth career
- Wuhan Football School

Senior career*
Years	Team	Apps	(Gls)
2011	Hubei CTGU Kangtian	20	(7)
2012–2016	Xinjiang Tianshan Leopard	135	(10)
2017–2020	Wuhan Zall	26	(2)
- * Club domestic league appearances and goals as of 14:01, 31 December 2020 (UTC)

Tong Xiaoxing (simplified Chinese: 童晓星; traditional Chinese: 童曉星; pinyin: Tóng Xiǎoxīng; born 7 January 1987) is a Chinese former footballer who played as a midfielder or forward.

== Club career ==
Tong Xiaoxing would graduate from the Wuhan Football School alongside Hao Junmin, however he had a failed trial with Qingdao Hailifeng and despite there being a development cooperation with Wuhan Huanghelou that would have seen graduates move into the reserve team, the club sold the reserve team. Without a club to play for Tong took a local coaching position with a Primary school as an eighteen year old, however in 2008 he would move back into football when he joined amateur local football club Wuhan Hongxing and won the local championship while also scoring 15 goals for the club. In 2010, Tong would have a successful trial for third-tier football club Hubei CTGU Kangtian and go on to start his professional career in the 2011 China League Two campaign.

A new club within the local area called Hubei China-Kyle would be formed to participate within the third tier for the 2012 China League Two campaign. He would have several training sessions with them during the off season before signing a contract with them. The move would be a big success and in his first season with the club he would gain promotion with them. Despite the higher level of competition, Tong would be a vital member of the team that was able to avoid relegation at the end of the 2013 China League One campaign. For the next several seasons, Tong ensured the club remained within the division and was even stayed with them as they changed their name to Xinjiang Tianshan Leopard moved cities.

On 20 January 2017 he transferred to fellow second-tier club Wuhan Zall. He would make his debut for the club in a league game on 11 March 2018 in a 1–0 away win over Shanghai Shenxin. He would go on to be an integral member of the team that gained promotion to the top tier for the club by winning the 2018 China League One division. This would be followed by his top tier debut on 1 December 2019 against Hebei China Fortune F.C. in a 2–1 defeat.

== Career statistics ==
As of 31 December 2020.

Club	Season	League			FA Cup		Other		Total	
Club	Season	Division	Apps	Goals	Apps	Goals	Apps	Goals	Apps	Goals
Hubei CTGU Kangtian	2011	China League Two	20	7	–		–		20	7
Xinjiang Tianshan Leopard	2012	China League Two	28	2	0	0	–		28	2
Xinjiang Tianshan Leopard	2013	China League One	29	2	0	0	–		29	2
Xinjiang Tianshan Leopard	2014	China League One	29	3	1	0	–		30	0
Xinjiang Tianshan Leopard	2015	China League One	23	2	2	0	–		25	2
Xinjiang Tianshan Leopard	2016	China League One	26	1	2	0	–		28	1
Xinjiang Tianshan Leopard	Total		135	10	5	0	0	0	140	10
Wuhan Zall	2017	China League One	0	0	0	0	–		0	0
Wuhan Zall	2018	China League One	25	2	1	0	–		26	2
Wuhan Zall	2019	Chinese Super League	1	0	0	0	–		1	0
Wuhan Zall	2020	Chinese Super League	0	0	0	0	0 (Note: Appearance(s) in CSL Relegation play-offs)	0	0	0
Wuhan Zall	Total		26	2	1	0	0	0	27	2
Career total			161	12	6	0	0	0	167	12

== Honours ==
Wuhan Zall

- China League One: 2018
