= Teng Shangkun =

Chinese association football player

Personal information
- Full name: 滕尚坤
- Date of birth: 10 January 1991 (age 35)
- Place of birth: Qingdao, Shandong, China
- Height: 1.86 m (6 ft 1 in)
- Position: Goalkeeper

Youth career
- 2001–2010: Shandong Luneng

Senior career*
Years	Team	Apps	(Gls)
2010–2013	Zhejiang Greentown	0	(0)
2011	→ Guangzhou R&F (loan)	0	(0)
2012	→ Chongqing FC (loan)	8	(0)
2014–2016	Qingdao Huanghai	9	(0)
2017–2021	Tianjin TEDA	26	(0)
2022	Tai'an Tiankuang	13	(0)
2023	Qingdao Red Lions	9	(0)
2024	Qingdao Red Lions	1	(0)
- * Club domestic league appearances and goals as of 13:14, 5 May 2022 (UTC)

Teng Shangkun (Chinese: 滕尚坤; pinyin: Téng Shàngkūn; born 10 January 1991) is a Chinese former footballer who played as a goalkeeper.

== Club career ==
Teng Shangkun would play for the Shandong Luneng youth team where he won the U15 football league championship in 2005 and 2006 as well as the U19 football league championship in 2009, which saw Zhejiang Greentown go on to sign him on 28 February 2010. He would be immediately promoted to their senior team at the start of the 2010 Chinese Super League season. On 7 July 2011 he was loaned to fellow Chinese Super League team Guangzhou R&F to gain some playing time. When Teng returned from his loan spell he was unable to gain any senior appearances and the new head coach Takeshi Okada decided that he was surplus to requirement. On 29 February 2012, Teng was loaned to second tier football club Chongqing FC for the 2012 China League One season. Teng would make his debut in a league game on 14 July 2012 against Guangdong Sunray Cave in a 1-0 victory due to the suspension of first choice goalkeeper Guo Wei.

On 28 February 2014, Teng joined second-tier football club Qingdao Huanghai for the start of the 2014 China League One season. He would make his debut for them on 15 April 2014 in a Chinese FA Cup game against Dalianwan Qianguan that ended in a 3-2 victory. After three seasons with Qingdao, Teng joined top tier club Tianjin TEDA on a free transfer and would make his debut in a league game against Henan Jianye on 20 April 2019 where he came on as substitute for the injured Yang Qipeng in a game that ended in a 3-2 victory.

On 29 January 2026, Teng was given a lifetime ban for match-fixing by the Chinese Football Association.

== Career statistics ==
As of 31 December 2020.

Appearances and goals by club, season, and competition
Club	Season	League			National Cup		Continental		Other		Total	
Club	Season	Division	Apps	Goals	Apps	Goals	Apps	Goals	Apps	Goals	Apps	Goals
Zhejiang Greentown	2010	Chinese Super League	0	0	0	0	–		–		0	0
Zhejiang Greentown	2011	Chinese Super League	0	0	0	0	0	0	–		0	0
Zhejiang Greentown	2013	Chinese Super League	0	0	0	0	–		–		0	0
Zhejiang Greentown	Total		0	0	0	0	0	0	0	0	0	0
Guangzhou R&F (loan)	2011	China League One	0	0	0	0	–		–		0	0
Chongqing FC (loan)	2012	China League One	8	0	0	0	–		–		8	0
Qingdao Huanghai	2014	China League One	5	0	1	0	–		–		6	0
Qingdao Huanghai	2015	China League One	5	0	1	0	–		–		6	0
Qingdao Huanghai	2016	China League One	0	0	0	0	–		–		0	0
Qingdao Huanghai	Total		10	0	2	0	0	0	0	0	12	0
Tianjin TEDA	2017	Chinese Super League	0	0	0	0	–		–		0	0
Tianjin TEDA	2018	Chinese Super League	0	0	0	0	–		–		0	0
Tianjin TEDA	2019	Chinese Super League	4	0	2	0	–		–		6	0
Tianjin TEDA	2020	Chinese Super League	14	0	4	0	–		–		18	0
Tianjin TEDA	Total		18	0	6	0	0	0	0	0	24	0
Career total			36	0	8	0	0	0	0	0	44	0
