= Peng Rui =

Chinese footballer

Peng Rui 彭睿
Personal information
- Date of birth: 30 August 1993 (age 33)
- Place of birth: An County, Sichuan, China
- Height: 1.75 m (5 ft 9 in)
- Position: Left-back

Youth career
- 2008–2012: Chongqing Lifan

Senior career*
Years	Team	Apps	(Gls)
2013–2016	Chongqing Lifan	0	(0)
2016	→ Chengdu Qbao (loan)	19	(2)
2017	Chengdu Qbao	21	(1)
2018–2019	Tianjin TEDA	8	(0)
2021	Hunan Billows	8	(0)
2022	Quanzhou Yassin	6	(0)
2023	Guangxi Yong City		
2023	Wuxi Wugo	4	(0)
- * Club domestic league appearances and goals as of 23 September 2024

Peng Rui (Chinese: 彭睿; pinyin: Péng Ruì; born 30 August 1993) is a Chinese footballer.

== Club career ==
Peng Rui started his professional football career in 2013 when he was promoted to China League One side Chongqing Lifan's first team squad. After making his debut he was used sparingly, however he was part of the squad that went on to win the division championship and promotion back into the top tier. Failing to establish himself within the team, Peng was linked with Qingdao Hainiu after the 2015 season.

Peng was loaned to China League Two club Chengdu Qbao for one season in March 2016. He made his debut for the club on 20 March 2016 in a 3–0 home win over amateur club Dalian Shengwei in the 2016 Chinese FA Cup. On 21 May 2016, he scored his first senior goal in a 2–1 home win against Sichuan Longfor in the Sichuan Derby. Peng scored two goals in 19 league appearances in the 2016 season. On 6 March 2017, he made a permanent transfer to Chengdu Qbao.

On 28 February 2018, Peng joined Chinese Super League side Tianjin TEDA. On 25 April 2018, he made his debut for Tianjin in the 2018 Chinese FA Cup against Wuhan Zall, in which Tianjin TEDA eventually won in the penalty shootout. He made his Super League debut on 6 May 2018 in a 5–1 away win over Guizhou Hengfeng, coming on as a substitute for Yang Fan in the 80th minute.

== Career statistics ==
As of 23 September 2024

Appearances and goals by club, season and competition
Club	Season	League			FA Cup		CSL Cup		Asia		Total	
Club	Season	Division	Apps	Goals	Apps	Goals	Apps	Goals	Apps	Goals	Apps	Goals
Chongqing Lifan	2013	China League One	0	0	2	0	-		-		2	0
Chongqing Lifan	2014	China League One	0	0	0	0	-		-		0	0
Chongqing Lifan	2015	Chinese Super League	0	0	1	0	-		-		1	0
Chongqing Lifan	Total		0	0	3	0	0	0	0	0	3	0
Chengdu Qbao (Loan)	2016	China League Two	19	2	2	0	-		-		21	2
Chengdu Qbao	2017	China League Two	21	1	0	0	-		-		21	1
Tianjin TEDA	2018	Chinese Super League	8	0	2	0	-		-		10	0
Tianjin TEDA	2019	Chinese Super League	0	0	2	0	-		-		2	0
Tianjin TEDA	Total		8	0	4	0	0	0	0	0	12	0
Hunan Billows	2021	China League Two	8	0	0	0	-		-		8	0
Quanzhou Yassin	2022	China League Two	6	0	-		-		-		6	0
Guangxi Yong City	2023	Chinese Champions League	-		-		-		-		-	
Wuxi Wugo	2023	China League One	4	0	0	0	-		-		4	0
Career total			66	3	9	0	0	0	0	0	75	3
