= 2015 Chinese FA Cup =

2015 The Chinese Football Association Cup
CFA Cup

Tournament details
- Country: China
- Teams: 64

Final positions
- Champions: Jiangsu Guoxin-Sainty (1st title)
- Runners-up: Shanghai Greenland Shenhua
- AFC Champions League: Jiangsu Guoxin-Sainty

Tournament statistics
- Matches played: 66
- Goals scored: 156 (2.36 per match)
- Top goal scorer(s): (Senegal) Demba Ba (6 goals)

Awards
- Best player: (Senegal) Demba Ba

Yanjing Beer 2015 Chinese FA Cup (Chinese: 燕京啤酒2015中国足球协会杯) was the 17th edition of Chinese FA Cup.

== Schedule ==
Round	Date	Matches	Clubs	New entries this round
Qualifying round	1–3 January 2015	24	16 → 8	16 Local amateur league champions
First round	21–22 March 2015; 28–29 March 2015	16	8+12+12 → 16	12 China League Two teams (sign up and selected by FA); 12 2014 China Amateur Football League teams (sign up and selected by FA)
Second round	15–16 April 2015	16	16+16 → 16	16 China League One teams
Third round	12–13 May 2015	16	16+16 → 16	16 Chinese Super League teams
Fourth round	7–8 July 2015	8	16 → 8	
Fifth round	19 August 2015	4	8 → 4	
Semi-finals	30 September 2015; 21 October 2015	4	4 → 2	
Final	22 November 2015; 29 November 2015	2	2 → 1	

== Qualifying rounds ==
=== Group A ===
Team	Pld	W	D	L	GF	GA	GD	Pts
Suzhou Jinfu	3	3	0	0	16	1	+15	9
Guangxi Liuzhou Liuyue	3	2	0	1	6	6	0	6
Zibo Zhangdian Iron & Steel	3	1	0	2	4	10	−6	3
Nanjing Gold	3	0	0	3	2	11	−9	0

1 January	Suzhou Jinfu (A)	5–0	Zibo Zhangdian Iron & Steel (A)	Yunshan Middle School, Guangzhou
8:30

1 January	Guangxi Liuzhou Liuyue (A)	2–0	Nanjing Gold (A)	Kwong Wai Yuk Memorial Middle School, Guangzhou
8:30

2 January	Zibo Zhangdian Iron & Steel (A)	0–3	Guangxi Liuzhou Liuyue (A)	Yunshan Middle School, Guangzhou
10:30

2 January	Suzhou Jinfu (A)	5–0	Nanjing Gold (A)	Kwong Wai Yuk Memorial Middle School, Guangzhou
10:30

3 January	Nanjing Gold (A)	2–4	Zibo Zhangdian Iron & Steel (A)	Yunshan Middle School, Guangzhou
15:30

3 January	Suzhou Jinfu (A)	6–1	Guangxi Liuzhou Liuyue (A)	Kwong Wai Yuk Memorial Middle School, Guangzhou
15:30

=== Group B ===
Team	Pld	W	D	L	GF	GA	GD	Pts
Guangzhou Haoxin	3	2	0	1	7	3	+4	6
Dalianwan Qianguan	3	2	0	1	8	2	+6	6
Dalian Ruiheng	3	2	0	1	6	6	0	6
Inner Mongolia Lucheng	3	0	0	3	1	11	−10	0

Tiebreakers

- Guangzhou Haoxin, Dalianwan Qianguan and Dalian Ruiheng are ranked on head-to-head record.

1 January	Guangzhou Haoxin (A)	2–1	Inner Mongolia Lucheng (A)	Yunshan Middle School, Guangzhou
10:30

1 January	Dalian Ruiheng (A)	2–1	Dalianwan Qianguan (A)	Kwong Wai Yuk Memorial Middle School, Guangzhou
10:30

2 January	Dalianwan Qianguan (A)	6–0	Inner Mongolia Lucheng (A)	Yunshan Middle School, Guangzhou
8:30

2 January	Guangzhou Haoxin (A)	5–1	Dalian Ruiheng (A)	Kwong Wai Yuk Memorial Middle School, Guangzhou
8:30

3 January	Dalian Ruiheng (A)	3–0	Inner Mongolia Lucheng (A)	Yunshan Middle School, Guangzhou
10:30

3 January	Dalianwan Qianguan (A)	1–0	Guangzhou Haoxin (A)	Kwong Wai Yuk Memorial Middle School, Guangzhou
10:30

=== Group C ===
Team	Pld	W	D	L	GF	GA	GD	Pts
Shanxi Longcheng Zhisheng	3	2	1	0	10	6	+4	7
Qingdao Kunpeng	3	2	0	1	8	3	+5	6
Zibo Sunday	3	1	1	1	4	4	0	4
Guangzhou Zhengyi	3	0	0	3	3	12	−9	0

1 January	Qingdao Kunpeng (A)	5–0	Guangzhou Zhengyi (A)	Yunshan Middle School, Guangzhou
13:30

1 January	Zibo Sunday (A)	2–2	Shanxi Longcheng Zhisheng (A)	Kwong Wai Yuk Memorial Middle School, Guangzhou
13:30

2 January	Guangzhou Zhengyi (A)	0–2	Zibo Sunday (A)	Yunshan Middle School, Guangzhou
15:30

2 January	Shanxi Longcheng Zhisheng (A)	3–1	Qingdao Kunpeng (A)	Kwong Wai Yuk Memorial Middle School, Guangzhou
15:30

3 January	Shanxi Longcheng Zhisheng (A)	5–3	Guangzhou Zhengyi (A)	Yunshan Middle School, Guangzhou
13:30

3 January	Qingdao Kunpeng (A)	2–0	Zibo Sunday (A)	Kwong Wai Yuk Memorial Middle School, Guangzhou
13:30

=== Group D ===
Team	Pld	W	D	L	GF	GA	GD	Pts
Hangzhou Zhipu	3	2	1	0	8	4	+4	7
Shanghai Jiading Boo King	3	1	2	0	11	5	+6	5
Guilin Tianlong	3	1	0	2	7	13	−6	3
Wuhan Huachuang	3	0	1	2	6	10	−4	1

1 January	Hangzhou Zhipu (A)	3–1	Guilin Tianlong (A)	Yunshan Middle School, Guangzhou
15:30

1 January	Shanghai Jiading Boo King (A)	2–2	Wuhan Huachuang (A)	Kwong Wai Yuk Memorial Middle School, Guangzhou
15:30

2 January	Guilin Tianlong (A)	0–6	Shanghai Jiading Boo King (A)	Yunshan Middle School, Guangzhou
13:30

2 January	Wuhan Huachuang(A)	0–2	Hangzhou Zhipu (A)	Kwong Wai Yuk Memorial Middle School, Guangzhou
13:30

3 January	Wuhan Huachuang(A)	4–6	Guilin Tianlong (A)	Yunshan Middle School, Guangzhou
8:30

3 January	Hangzhou Zhipu (A)	3–3	Shanghai Jiading Boo King (A)	Kwong Wai Yuk Memorial Middle School, Guangzhou
8:30

== First round ==
21 March	Changchun Subway (A)	0–1	Guangxi Longguida (3)	Development Area Stadium, Changchun
14:00			Chen Zheng 46'	Referee: Ma Ye

21 March	Fujian Broncos (3)	0–0 (0–3 p)	Anhui Litian (3)	Jinjiang Zuchang Stadium, Quanzhou
14:30				Referee: Sun Bing
	Penalties
	Liang Yanfeng (penalty missed); Yang Guang (penalty missed); Gong Hankui (penalty missed)		(penalty scored) Wang Ziming; (penalty scored) Wang Peng; (penalty scored) Zhao Huang

21 March	Baotou Nanjiao (3)	3–0	Shenyang Dongjin (3)	Baotou Olympic Sports Center Stadium, Baotou
15:00	Zhang Shuang 13', 73'; Wang Hanbing 58'			Attendance: 22,860; Referee: Guan Xing

21 March	Meizhou Kejia (3)	7–0	Shenyang Wit (A)	Wuhua Stadium, Wuhua
15:00	Li Zhilang 20', 71'; Yang Chen 21'; Gao Zhilin 29', 43'; Yu Jianfeng 86'; Jiang Zhongxiao 88'			Attendance: 3,838; Referee: Xing Qi

22 March	Zhaoqing Hengtai (A)	0–2	Wuhan Hongxing (A)	Zhaoqing Stadium, Zhaoqing
15:00			Chen Hao 30'; Zhang Xiaolong (?)	Referee: Li Pan

22 March	Hangzhou Ange (A)	1–1 (4–2 p)	Shanxi Longcheng Zhisheng (A)	China Academy of Art (Xiangshan Central Campus) Stadium, Hangzhou
15:30	Wang Fei 13'		Zhang Yu 55'	Referee: Liu Lin
	Penalties
	(penalty scored); Wang Fei (penalty scored); Hu Jie (penalty scored) (penalty scored)		(penalty scored) Ning Ning; (penalty missed) Zhao Chen; (penalty scored) Yu Hang (penalty missed)

28 March	Dalian Transcendence (3)	3–0	Guangzhou Haoxin (A)	Jinzhou Stadium, Dalian
14:30	Liu Tao 50'; Nan Yunqi 63'; Zhao Yibo 81'			Referee: Ma Li

28 March	Wuhan New Era (A)	1–0	Guangxi Liuzhou Liuyue (A)	Zhongnan University of Economics and Law Football Stadium, Wuhan
15:00	Jin Xin 58'			Referee: Wu Liying

28 March	Tianjin Huochetou (3)	3–1	Yunnan Wanhao (3)	Tianjin Huochetou Stadium, Tianjin
15:00	Wang Qiang 63' (pen.); Liu Yang 74', 85'		Wang Junchao 90'	Referee: Kou Jianxun

28 March	Lijiang Jiayunhao (3)	3–0	Nanjing Qianbao (3)	Lijiang Stadium, Lijiang
15:00	Zhang Xiang 2', 25'; Wen Shuo 35'			Referee: Mo Weicong

28 March	Ningxia Qupper (3)	3–0	Xi'an Gaoxin Thermal Power (A)	Helan Mountain Stadium, Yinchuan
15:00	Xing Kai 32'; Li Bin 53'; Chen Bo 84'			Referee: Tang Kun

28 March	Shanghai Jiading Boo King (A)	0–0 (4–5 p)	Qingdao Kunpeng (A)	Jiading Stadium, Shanghai
15:30				Referee: Guo Hao
	Penalties
	Penalty missed Penalty scored		Penalty scored

28 March	Sichuan Xindahai (3)	2–0	Dalianwan Qianguan (A)	Santai County Stadium, Santai
15:30	Chen Shaoqin 21'; Wang Kai 29' (pen.)			Referee: Shen Yinhao

29 March	Suzhou Jinfu (A)	1–0	Dalian Longjuanfeng (A)	Soochow University Stadium, Suzhou
15:00	Yan Xiao 33'			Referee: Li Haihe

29 March	Wuhan Dongfeng Honda (A)	0–0 (5–6 p)	Ningbo Yinbo (A)	Wuhan Business University Stadium, Wuhan
15:00				Referee: He Xiaohu
	Penalties
	Penalty scored Penalty missed		Penalty scored

29 March	Meixian Juncheng Hakka (3)	1–2	Hebei Elite (3)	Meixian Tsang Hin-chi Stadium, Meizhou
15:00	Li Zhengyu 37'		He Yuxuan 5'; Han Zilong 70'	Attendance: 6,350; Referee: Zhou Gang

== Second round ==
15 April	Ningbo Yinbo (A)	1–1 (5–6 p)	Shenzhen Yuheng (2)	Ningbo Huamao Foreign Languages School Stadium, Ningbo
15:00	Gao Boyang 45'		Wu Wei'an 12'	Attendance: 1,016; Referee: Wu Liying
	Penalties
	Penalty scored Penalty missed		Penalty scored Penalty missed

15 April	Hebei Elite (3)	0–1	Beijing BG Yanjing (2)	Qinhuangdao Olympic Sports Center Stadium, Qinhuangdao
15:00			Yang Guiyan 88'	Attendance: 526

15 April	Lijiang Jiayunhao (3)	0–0 (3–4 p)	Jiangxi Liansheng (2)	Lijiang Stadium, Lijiang
15:00
	Penalties
	Penalty missed Penalty scored		Penalty scored Penalty missed

15 April	Dalian Transcendence (3)	1–1 (5–3 p)	Beijing Xinyuan (2)	Jinzhou Stadium, Dalian
15:00	Quan Heng 16'		Han Guanghui 76'	Referee: Zhang Long
	Penalties
	Han Jiabao (penalty scored); Su Di (penalty scored); Du Wenxiang (penalty scored); Liu Huan (penalty scored); Guo Wei (penalty scored)		(penalty scored) Li Xiangbin; (penalty scored) Meng Yang; (penalty missed) Guo Ziyin; (penalty scored) Wang Chao

15 April	Meizhou Kejia (3)	1–0	Hunan Billows (2)	Wuhua County Stadium, Wuhua
15:00	Jiang Zhongxiao 90+3'			Attendance: 3,261; Referee: Xia Jun

15 April	Qingdao Kunpeng (A)	1–1 (9–10 p)	Guizhou Zhicheng (2)	Tiantai Stadium, Qingdao
15:00	Ma Jun 40'		Yang Jian 84' (pen.)
	Penalties
	Wang Long (penalty missed) (penalty scored); Niu Zhanlei (penalty scored) (penalty scored) (penalty scored); Zhang Shudong (penalty scored); Wang Hao (penalty missed); Xu Chao (penalty missed); Chen Kang (penalty scored); Zhang Haiquan (penalty missed); Li Kai (penalty scored); Wang Long (penalty scored) (penalty scored); Niu Zhanlei (penalty missed)		(penalty scored) Wang Yongxin (penalty scored); (penalty missed) Yang Jian (penalty scored) (penalty scored) (penalty scored) (penalty missed) (penalty missed) (penalty scored) (penalty missed); (penalty scored) Pang Zhiquan; (penalty scored) Wang Yongxin (penalty scored); (penalty scored) Yang Jian

15 April	Wuhan New Era (A)	1–0	Qingdao Hainiu (2)	Zhongnan University of Economics and Law Football Stadium, Wuhan
15:30	Si Jun 89'

15 April	Wuhan Hongxing (A)	1–0	Wuhan Zall (2)	Hankou Cultural Sports Centre, Wuhan
15:30	Wang Kai 66'

15 April	Tianjin Huochetou (3)	1–1 (3–5 p)	Xinjiang Dabancheng Nahuan (2)	Tianjin Huochetou Stadium, Tianjin
15:30	Zhang Chengxiang 20'		Jiang Sheng 22'
	Penalties
	Ma Hongwei (penalty missed) (penalty scored) (penalty scored) (penalty scored)		Penalty scored

15 April	Sichuan Xindahai (3)	0–1	Hohhot Zhongyou (2)	Santai County Stadium, Santai
15:30			Wang Yunlong 45'	Referee: Sun Bing

15 April	Baotou Nanjiao (3)	1–1 (3–5 p)	Tianjin Songjiang (2)	Baotou Olympic Sports Center Stadium, Baotou
19:00	Tang Yicheng 5'		Liu Qing 59'	Attendance: 4,980
	Penalties
	(penalty scored) (penalty scored); Huo Liang (penalty missed) (penalty scored)		(penalty scored) Liu Qing (penalty scored) (penalty scored) (penalty scored) (penalty scored)

15 April	Anhui Litian (3)	1–0	Harbin Yiteng (2)	Hefei Olympic Sports Center Stadium, Hefei
19:30	Wang Ziming 23'

15 April	Guangxi Longguida (3)	0–2	Hebei China Fortune (2)	Guangxi Sports Center, Nanning
20:00			Zhu Haiwei 57'; Song Wenjie 75'

16 April	Suzhou Jinfu (A)	0–0 (3–4 p)	Yanbian Changbaishan (2)	Soochow University Stadium, Suzhou
15:00				Attendance: 516; Referee: Guo Baolong
	Penalties
	Wang Feng (penalty scored); Jiang Peng (penalty scored); Jiang Tao (penalty missed); Li Yi (penalty scored); Bian Jun (penalty missed)		(penalty scored) Gao Wanguo; (penalty scored) Li Hao; (penalty scored) Li Haojie; (penalty scored) Exmetjan Ekber

16 April	Ningxia Qupper (3)	0–0 (3–4 p)	Qingdao Jonoon (2)	Helan Mountain Stadium, Yinchuan
15:00
	Penalties
	(penalty missed); Li Hao (penalty scored); Zou Yucheng (penalty scored); Yang Changpeng (penalty missed); Jia Yudong (penalty scored)		(penalty scored) Zhong Yihao; (penalty missed) Wang Ziming; (penalty scored) Dilmurat Batur; (penalty scored) Song Long; (penalty scored) Sha Yibo

16 April	Hangzhou Ange (A)	0–2	Dalian Aerbin (2)	Jianggan Sports Center, Hangzhou
15:30			Wang Jinxian 2'; Du Yuxin 50'	Attendance: 1,216

== Third round ==
12 May	Dalian Transcendence (3)	1–2	Shanghai SIPG (1)	Jinzhou Stadium, Dalian
19:00	Quan Heng 53'		Li Haowen 69'; He Guan 71'	Attendance: 2,211; Referee: Lin Jun

13 May	Tianjin Songjiang (2)	0–2	Guizhou Moutai (1)	Tuanbo Football Stadium, Tianjin
15:00			Ricardo Santos 73'; Feng Renliang 82'	Attendance: 966; Referee: Guan Xing

13 May	Yanbian Changbaishan (2)	1–4	Tianjin Teda Quanjian (1)	Yanji Nationwide Fitness Centre Stadium, Yanji
15:00	Ha Tae-goon 72'		Zhou Liao 1', 13'; Nie Tao 20'; Wang Xinxin 40'	Attendance: 1,872; Referee: Liu Lin

13 May	Guizhou Zhicheng (2)	1–5	Jiangsu Guoxin-Sainty (1)	Guizhou Provincial Stadium, Guiyang
15:00	Pang Zhiquan 32'		Kjartansson 21'; Zhang Xinlin 39'; Bari Mamatil 50'; Li Ang 56'; Gu Wenxiang 79'	Attendance: 1,531; Referee: Gu Chunhan

13 May	Qingdao Jonoon (2)	1–0	Changchun Yatai (1)	Tiantai Stadium, Qingdao
15:00	Dilmurat Batur 48'			Attendance: 2,176; Referee: Xu Fuxin

13 May	Wuhan New Era (A)	1–6	Shandong Luneng Taishan (1)	Zhongnan University of Economics and Law Football Stadium, Wuhan
15:30	Si Jun 88'		Zhang Chi 5'; Zhao Mingjian 7'; Yang Xu 28', 51'; Han Peng 58'; Zhang Wenzhao 85'	Attendance: 1,632; Referee: Zhao Zhizhi

13 May	Wuhan Hongxing (A)	1–1 (7–8 p)	Hangzhou Greentown (1)	Hankou Cultural Sports Centre, Wuhan
15:30	Huang Lei 41'		Zhang Yuning 18'	Attendance: 7,831; Referee: Guo Baolong
	Penalties
	Hu Hao (penalty scored); Zhang Xian (penalty scored); Zhou Rui (penalty scored); Wang Kai (penalty scored); Huang Lei (penalty scored); Deng Sheng (penalty scored); Cui Wenjun (penalty scored); Yan Qi (penalty missed)		(penalty scored) Wu Wei; (penalty scored) Dong Yu; (penalty scored) Zang Yifeng; (penalty scored) Fan Xiaodong; (penalty scored) Xie Pengfei; (penalty scored) Zhao Xiaotian; (penalty scored) Zhao Yuhao; (penalty scored) Zhang Yuning

13 May	Meizhou Kejia (3)	0–2	Shanghai Greenland Shenhua (1)	Guangdong Provincial People's Stadium, Guangzhou
16:00			Wang Yun 14'; Jiang Kun 68'	Attendance: 5,972; Referee: Li Pan

13 May	Xinjiang Dabancheng Nahuan (2)	2–1	Guangzhou Evergrande Taobao (1)	Xinjiang Sports Centre, Ürümqi
18:00	Vicente 43'; Dănălache 90+4' (pen.)		Zhang Jiaqi 81'	Attendance: 15,421; Referee: Fan Qi

13 May	Beijing BG Yanjing (2)	1–0	Shijiazhuang Ever Bright (1)	Olympic Sports Centre, Beijing
18:00	Karikari 54'			Attendance: 3,973; Referee: Chen Gang

13 May	Dalian Aerbin (2)	1–2	Chongqing Lifan (1)	Dalian Sports Center, Dalian
19:00	Zhao Xuebin 42'		Cheng Mouyi 50'; Lü Haidong 60'	Attendance: 1,502; Referee: Shi Zhenlu

13 May	Jiangxi Liansheng (2)	4–0	Liaoning Panjin Whowin (1)	Jiujiang Sports Center Stadium, Jiujiang
19:30	Adi Rocha 2', 33', 61'; Ren Xin 40'			Attendance: 23,108; Referee: Zhang Miao

13 May	Anhui Litian (3)	0–4	Henan Jianye (1)	Hefei Olympic Sports Center Stadium, Hefei
19:35			Yin Hongbo 39' (pen.); Lei Yongchi 57'; Xu Yang 79'; Bi Jinhao 84'	Attendance: 12,090; Referee: Shen Yinhao

13 May	Hohhot Zhongyou (2)	0–1	Guangzhou R&F (1)	Hohhot City Stadium, Hohhot
19:35			Ye Chugui 67'	Attendance: 20,139; Referee: Zhang Long

13 May	Hebei China Fortune (2)	0–0 (2–1 p)	Shanghai Shenxin (1)	Qinhuangdao Olympic Sports Center Stadium, Qinhuangdao
20:00				Attendance: 3,308; Referee: He Xiaohu
	Penalties
	Jia Xiaochen (penalty missed); Song Wenjie (penalty scored); Ma Dongliang (penalty missed); Laajab (penalty scored)		(penalty scored) Jia Tianzi; (penalty missed) Chen Hao; (penalty missed) Huang Wei; (penalty missed) Liu Junnan; (penalty missed) Cui Ren

13 May	Shenzhen Yuheng (2)	1–2	Beijing Guoan (1)	Shenzhen Stadium, Shenzhen
20:00	Piao Cheng 40' (o.g.)		Damjanović 82'; Fejzullahu 90+1' (pen.)	Attendance: 20,581; Referee: Guo Hao

== Fourth round ==
7 July	Jiangxi Liansheng (2)	2–3	Guizhou Moutai (1)	Jiujiang Sports Center Stadium, Jiujiang
19:30	Adi Rocha 33', 43'		Yang Yihu 9'; Ricardo Santos 61', 79'	Attendance: 24,367; Referee: Lin Jun

8 July	Qingdao Jonoon (2)	0–3	Shanghai Greenland Shenhua (1)	Tiantai Stadium, Qingdao
15:30			Lü Zheng 23'; Wang Yun 70'; Fan Lingjiang 87'	Attendance: 3,177; Referee: Zhang Lei

8 July	Xinjiang Dabancheng Nahuan (2)	1–0	Tianjin Teda Quanjian (1)	Xinjiang Sports Centre, Ürümqi
19:00	Dănălache 35'			Attendance: 7,541; Referee: Wang Zhe

8 July	Beijing BG Yanjing (2)	2–0	Beijing Guoan (1)	Olympic Sports Centre, Beijing
19:30	Yan Xiangchuang 5'; Lazović 60' (pen.)			Attendance: 23,989; Referee: Wang Jin

8 July	Chongqing Lifan (1)	1–4	Shandong Luneng Taishan (1)	Chongqing Olympic Sports Center, Chongqing
19:30	Jael Ferreira 84'		Wang Yongpo 39'; Aloísio 44'; Montillo 76'; Yang Yun 90+3' (o.g.)	Attendance: 8,160; Referee: Zhao Zhizhi

8 July	Shanghai SIPG (1)	2–1	Guangzhou R&F (1)	Shanghai Stadium, Shanghai
19:45	Conca 61' (pen.); Wu Lei 69'		Wang Shenchao 24' (o.g.)	Attendance: 13,108; Referee: Zhou Gang

8 July	Henan Jianye (1)	3–1	Hangzhou Greentown (1)	Hanghai Stadium, Zhengzhou
19:45	Yin Hongbo 9' (pen.), 36'; Zachara 87'		Luo Jing 25' (pen.)	Attendance: 15,357; Referee: Ai Kun

8 July	Hebei China Fortune (2)	1–2	Jiangsu Guoxin-Sainty (1)	Qinhuangdao Olympic Sports Center Stadium, Qinhuangdao
20:00	Du Wei 55'		Kjartansson 60'; Wu Xi 80'	Attendance: 5,018; Referee: Wang Di

== Fifth round ==
19 August	Xinjiang Dabancheng Nahuan (2)	1–3	Jiangsu Guoxin-Sainty (1)	Xinjiang Sports Centre, Ürümqi
19:00	Shewket Yalqun 44'		Ottesen 9'; Kjartansson 14'; Ren Hang 37'	Attendance: 6,549; Referee: Wang Di

19 August	Beijing BG Yanjing (2)	0–0 (5–3 p)	Guizhou Moutai (1)	Olympic Sports Centre, Beijing
19:30				Attendance: 8,155; Referee: Ma Ning
	Penalties
	Yan Xiangchuang (penalty scored); Li Zhendong (penalty scored); Karikari (penalty scored); Valencia (penalty scored); Wang Cun (penalty scored)		(penalty scored) Ricardo Santos; (penalty missed) Hyuri; (penalty scored) Liu Yang; (penalty scored) Misimović

19 August	Henan Jianye (1)	1–1 (2–4 p)	Shandong Luneng Taishan (1)	Hanghai Stadium, Zhengzhou
19:45	Patiño 22'		Jin Jingdao 85'	Attendance: 17,173; Referee: Shi Zhenlu
	Penalties
	Patiño (penalty scored); Zachara (penalty missed); Gomes (penalty scored); Liang Yu (penalty missed)		(penalty scored) Wang Yongpo; (penalty scored) Júnior Urso; (penalty scored) Zhang Wenzhao; (penalty scored) Cheng Yuan

19 August	Shanghai Greenland Shenhua (1)	3–3 (5–4 p)	Shanghai SIPG (1)	Hongkou Football Stadium, Shanghai
19:45	Moreno 8'; Wang Yun 25'; Ba 70'		Wu Lei 28'; Gyan 56'; Conca 86'	Attendance: 25,786; Referee: Tan Hai
	Penalties
	Wang Yun (penalty scored); Cahill (penalty scored); Ba (penalty scored); Sissoko (penalty scored); Lü Zheng (penalty scored)		(penalty scored) Conca; (penalty scored) Davi; (penalty scored) Gyan; (penalty missed) Lü Wenjun; (penalty scored) Wu Lei

== Semi-finals ==
=== First leg ===
30 September	Shandong Luneng Taishan (1)	1–2	Jiangsu Guoxin-Sainty (1)	Jinan Olympic Sports Center Stadium, Jinan
19:35	Aloísio 90+2'		Kjartansson 33'; Wu Xi 57'	Attendance: 16,930; Referee: Zhou Gang

30 September	Shanghai Greenland Shenhua (1)	3–2	Beijing BG Yanjing (2)	Hongkou Football Stadium, Shanghai
19:45	Ba 4', 37' (pen.), 82' (pen.)		Cui Zhongkai 13'; Valencia 65'	Attendance: 18,760; Referee: Lin Jun

=== Second leg ===
21 October	Beijing BG Yanjing (2)	1–4	Shanghai Greenland Shenhua (1)	Olympic Sports Centre, Beijing
19:30	Lazović 90+1' (pen.)		Cahill 17'; Ba 28', 78'; Cao Yunding 90+3'	Attendance: 9,108; Referee: He Xiaohu

Shanghai Greenland Shenhua won 7–3 on aggregate.

21 October	Jiangsu Guoxin-Sainty (1)	2–0	Shandong Luneng Taishan (1)	Nanjing Olympic Sports Center, Nanjing
19:45	Sun Ke 62'; Sammir 90+1'			Attendance: 41,560; Referee: Wang Jin

Jiangsu Guoxin-Sainty won 4–1 on aggregate.

== Final ==
=== First leg ===
22 November
19:45

Jiangsu Guoxin-Sainty (1)	0–0	Shanghai Greenland Shenhua (1)

Nanjing Olympic Sports Center, Nanjing
Attendance: 53,166
Referee: Fan Qi

Jiangsu	Shanghai

Jiangsu:^{1}
GK	1	(China) Deng Xiaofei
RB	5	(China) Zhou Yun
CB	23	(China) Ren Hang (c)
CB	31	(Romania) Marius Constantin
LB	24	(China) Ji Xiang
CM	12	(China) Zhang Xiaobin
CM	22	(China) Wu Xi
RM	20	(China) Sun Ke		(substituted off) 89'
LM	16	(Croatia) Sammir		(substituted off) 85'
SS	11	(Japan) Sergio Escudero
ST	10	(Iceland) Viðar Örn Kjartansson		(substituted off) 77'
Substitutes:
GK	25	(China) Jiang Hao
DF	17	(China) Xu Youzhi
DF	28	(China) Yang Xiaotian	(yellow card) 90+2' (yellow-red card) 90+3'	(substituted on) 77'
MF	7	(China) Zhang Xinlin
MF	13	(China) Tao Yuan		(substituted on) 89'
FW	50	(China) Ge Wei		(substituted on) 85'
Coach:
(Romania) Dan Petrescu

Shanghai:
GK	1	(China) Geng Xiaofeng
RB	8	(China) Zhang Lu
CB	3	(China) Li Jianbin
CB	30	(China) Tao Jin
LB	23	(China) Bai Jiajun
DM	14	(Mali) Mohamed Sissoko	(yellow card) 41'
DM	20	(China) Wang Yun
AM	17	(Australia) Tim Cahill
RW	10	(Colombia) Giovanni Moreno (c)
LW	28	(China) Cao Yunding
CF	9	(Senegal) Demba Ba
Substitutes:
GK	22	(China) Qiu Shengjiong
DF	2	(China) Xiong Fei
DF	4	(Greece) Avraam Papadopoulos
DF	19	(China) Zheng Kaimu
MF	21	(China) Jiang Kun
MF	29	(China) Fan Lingjiang
FW	11	(China) Lü Zheng
Coach:
(France) Francis Gillot

Assistant referees:
Huo Weiming
Cao Yi
Fourth official:
Li Haihe

- ^1 Sölvi Ottesen withdrew during the warm-up with injury and was replaced by Sammir.

=== Second leg ===
29 November
16:00

Shanghai Greenland Shenhua (1)	0–1 (a.e.t.)	Jiangsu Guoxin-Sainty (1)
		Sammir 110'

Hongkou Football Stadium, Shanghai
Attendance: 25,332
Referee: Wang Zhe

Shanghai	Jiangsu

Shanghai:
GK	1	(China) Geng Xiaofeng
RB	8	(China) Zhang Lu		(substituted off) 112'
CB	3	(China) Li Jianbin	(yellow card) 17'
CB	30	(China) Tao Jin		(substituted off) 65'
LB	23	(China) Bai Jiajun	(yellow card) 90+5'
DM	14	(Mali) Mohamed Sissoko
DM	20	(China) Wang Yun	(yellow card) 80'
RM	10	(Colombia) Giovanni Moreno (c)		(substituted off) 112'
LM	28	(China) Cao Yunding
SS	17	(Australia) Tim Cahill	(yellow card) 90+5'
CF	9	(Senegal) Demba Ba
Substitutes:
GK	22	(China) Qiu Shengjiong
DF	2	(China) Xiong Fei	(yellow card) 102'	(substituted on) 65'
DF	4	(Greece) Avraam Papadopoulos
DF	19	(China) Zheng Kaimu		(substituted on) 112'
MF	21	(China) Jiang Kun
MF	29	(China) Fan Lingjiang
FW	11	(China) Lü Zheng		(substituted on) 112'
Coach:
(France) Francis Gillot

Jiangsu:
GK	30	(China) Zhang Sipeng	(yellow card) 76'
RB	5	(China) Zhou Yun	(yellow card) 53'
CB	6	(Iceland) Sölvi Ottesen	(yellow card) 90+5'	(substituted off) 107'
CB	31	(Romania) Marius Constantin
LB	23	(China) Ren Hang (c)	(yellow card) 90+4'
CM	12	(China) Zhang Xiaobin
CM	8	(China) Liu Jianye		(substituted off) 72'
RM	20	(China) Sun Ke	(yellow card) 120'
LM	24	(China) Ji Xiang
AM	22	(China) Wu Xi
ST	10	(Iceland) Viðar Örn Kjartansson		(substituted off) 87'
Substitutes:
GK	1	(China) Deng Xiaofei
DF	2	(China) Li Ang	(yellow card) 120+2'	(substituted on) 107'
MF	7	(China) Zhang Xinlin
MF	13	(China) Tao Yuan
MF	16	(Croatia) Sammir		(substituted on) 87'
FW	11	(Japan) Sergio Escudero		(substituted on) 72'
FW	50	(China) Ge Wei
Coach:
(Romania) Dan Petrescu

Assistant referees:
A Lamusi
Zhong Yong
Fourth official:
Huang Yejun

Jiangsu Guoxin-Sainty won 1–0 on aggregate.

== Awards ==
- Top Scorer(s): (Senegal) Demba Ba (Shanghai Greenland Shenhua) (6 goals)
- Most Valuable Player: (Senegal) Demba Ba (Shanghai Greenland Shenhua)
- Best Coach: (Romania) Dan Petrescu (Jiangsu Guoxin-Sainty)
- Fair Play Award: Xinjiang Dabancheng Nahuan
- Dark Horse Award: Xinjiang Dabancheng Nahuan

== Top scorers ==
Rank	Player	Club	Goals
1	(Senegal) Demba Ba	Shanghai Greenland Shenhua	6
2	(Brazil) Adi Rocha	Jiangxi Liansheng	5
3	(Iceland) Viðar Örn Kjartansson	Jiangsu Guoxin-Sainty	4
4	(China) Wang Yun	Shanghai Greenland Shenhua	3
4	(China) Yin Hongbo	Henan Jianye	3
6	(China) Jiang Zhongxiao	Meizhou Kejia	2
6	(China) Quan Heng	Dalian Transcendence	2
6	(China) Si Jun	Wuhan New Era	2
6	(Brazil) Ricardo Santos	Guizhou Moutai	2
6	(Romania) Cristian Dănălache	Xinjiang Dabancheng Nahuan	2
6	(Serbia) Danko Lazović	Beijing BG Yanjing	2
6	(Brazil) Aloísio	Shandong Luneng Taishan	2
6	(Argentina) Darío Conca	Shanghai SIPG	2
6	(China) Wu Lei	Shanghai SIPG	2
6	(China) Wu Xi	Jiangsu Guoxin-Sainty	2
6	(Croatia) Sammir	Jiangsu Guoxin-Sainty	2
