= List of Chinese football transfers summer 2017 =

This is a list of Chinese football transfers for the 2017 season summer transfer window. The transfer windows of Chinese Super League, China League One, and China League Two were opened on 19 June 2017 and closed on 14 July 2017.

== Super League ==
=== Beijing Sinobo Guoan ===
In:

| No. | Pos. | Nation | Player |
|---|---|---|---|
| 35 | MF | CHN | Ning Weichen (from (Portugal) CD Cova da Piedade) |
| 62 | DF | CHN | Zhang Zijian (from Shenyang Dongjin) |
| 63 | DF | CHN | Huang Tao (from Shenyang Dongjin) |
| - | MF | CHN | Wang Ziming (from Qingdao Jonoon) |

Out:

| No. | Pos. | Nation | Player |
|---|---|---|---|
| 17 | FW | TUR | Burak Yılmaz (to (Turkey) Trabzonspor) |
| - | MF | CHN | Wang Ziming (loan to Qingdao Jonoon) |

=== Changchun Yatai ===
In:

| No. | Pos. | Nation | Player |

Out:

| No. | Pos. | Nation | Player |
|---|---|---|---|
| 3 | DF | CHN | Yan Shipeng (loan to Shaanxi Chang'an Athletic) |
| 6 | DF | CHN | Pei Shuai (to Tianjin Quanjian) |
| 20 | MF | CHN | Han Deming (loan to Shaanxi Chang'an Athletic) |
| 44 | DF | TPE | Wang Chueh-Chun (Released) |
| 45 | FW | TPE | Ko Yu-Ting (Released) |

=== Chongqing Dangdai Lifan ===
In:

| No. | Pos. | Nation | Player |
|---|---|---|---|
| 25 | DF | CHN | Liao Junjian (loan from Hebei China Fortune) |
| 59 | DF | CHN | Man Yuan (Free agent) |
| 61 | DF | CHN | Cao Qingheng (Free agent) |
| 62 | DF | CHN | Li Rui (Free agent) |
| 63 | MF | CHN | Wang Shiwei (Free agent) |
| 64 | DF | CHN | You Jiabin (Free agent) |
| 65 | DF | CHN | Cao Dong (Free agent) |
| 67 | GK | CHN | Shang Shiqi (Free agent) |
| 68 | DF | CHN | Chen Tao (Free agent) |
| 69 | DF | CHN | An Kang (Free agent) |
| 70 | DF | CHN | Xu Wu (from Shanghai Shenhua) |
| 71 | MF | CHN | Kong Longxing (Free agent) |
| 73 | MF | CHN | Lü Jie (Free agent) |

Out:

| No. | Pos. | Nation | Player |
|---|---|---|---|
| 28 | MF | CHN | Yao Daogang (loan return to (Portugal) Gondomar) |
| 36 | MF | CHN | Xu Xu (loan return to (Spain) Granada) |
| 44 | DF | CHN | Zhang Junjie (to (New Zealand) Team Wellington) |
| 46 | MF | CHN | Xi Zhejian (to (Czech Republic) FK Mohelnice) |
| 54 | MF | CHN | Sun Zhengyang (to Shanghai Sunfun) |
| - | DF | CHN | An Bang (to (Montenegro) FK Dečić) |

=== Guangzhou Evergrande Taobao ===
In:

| No. | Pos. | Nation | Player |
|---|---|---|---|
| 30 | FW | BRA | Muriqui (from (Brazil) Vasco da Gama) |
| 34 | MF | CHN | Feng Boxuan (from (Portugal) Torreense) |
| 36 | FW | CHN | Deng Yubiao (from (Portugal) Oriental Dragon) |
| 63 | MF | CHN | Wu Xiang (from (Portugal) Oriental Dragon) |
| - | DF | CHN | Yang Zhaohui (loan return from (Portugal) Vizela) |

Out:

| No. | Pos. | Nation | Player |
|---|---|---|---|
| 8 | MF | BRA | Paulinho (to (Spain) Barcelona) |
| 23 | DF | KOR | Kim Hyung-il (to (South Korea) Bucheon FC 1995) |
| 40 | GK | CHN | Liu Shibo (loan to Nei Mongol Zhongyou) |
| 51 | GK | CHN | Liu Weiguo (loan to Yinchuan Helanshan) |
| - | DF | CHN | Imran Kurban (loan to (Czech Republic) FK Mohelnice) |

=== Guangzhou R&F ===
In:

| No. | Pos. | Nation | Player |
|---|---|---|---|
| 5 | DF | ISL | Sölvi Ottesen (from (Thailand) Buriram United) |
| 6 | MF | CHN | Yang Wanshun (from Jiangsu Yancheng Dingli) |
| 15 | MF | CHN | Ning An (loan return from (Hong Kong) R&F) |
| 21 | MF | CHN | Zhu Di (loan return from (Hong Kong) R&F) |
| 24 | FW | CHN | Mai Jiajian (loan return from (Hong Kong) R&F) |
| 30 | DF | CHN | Fu Yunlong (loan return from (Hong Kong) R&F) |
| 42 | DF | CHN | Ma Weichao (loan return from (Hong Kong) R&F) |
| 44 | MF | CHN | Wei Zongren (loan return from (Hong Kong) R&F) |
| 45 | GK | CHN | Long Wenhao (loan return from (Hong Kong) R&F) |
| 54 | GK | CHN | Xing Yu (loan return from (Hong Kong) R&F) |
| - | DF | CHN | Tu Dongxu (loan return from (Hong Kong) R&F) |
| - | FW | BRA | Bruninho (loan return from (Denmark) FC Midtjylland) |
| - | GK | CHN | Chen Zirong (loan return from (Denmark) Vejle Boldklub) |

Out:

| No. | Pos. | Nation | Player |
|---|---|---|---|
| 16 | GK | CHN | Pei Chensong (loan to (Hong Kong) R&F) |
| 22 | DF | KOR | Jang Hyun-soo (to (Japan) FC Tokyo) |
| 27 | MF | CHN | Chen Fuhai (loan to (Hong Kong) R&F) |
| 31 | DF | CHN | Liang Zhanhao (loan to (Hong Kong) R&F) |
| 33 | DF | CHN | Liang Yongfeng (loan to (Hong Kong) R&F) |
| 34 | MF | CHN | Wang Xinhui (loan to (Hong Kong) R&F) |
| 38 | MF | CHN | Zhang Jiajie (loan to (Hong Kong) R&F) |
| 48 | MF | CHN | Deng Yanlin (loan to (Hong Kong) R&F) |
| 60 | DF | CHN | Zhao Ming (loan to (Hong Kong) R&F) |
| - | DF | CHN | Tu Dongxu (to Meixian Techand) |
| - | FW | BRA | Bruninho (loan to (Hong Kong) R&F) |
| - | GK | CHN | Chen Zirong (loan to (Hong Kong) R&F) |

=== Guizhou Hengfeng Zhicheng ===
In:

| No. | Pos. | Nation | Player |
|---|---|---|---|
| 26 | MF | ESP | Mario Suárez (from (England) Watford) |
| 35 | DF | CHN | Du Wei (loan from Hebei China Fortune) |
| 40 | FW | ESP | Rubén Castro (loan from (Spain) Real Betis) |

Out:

| No. | Pos. | Nation | Player |
|---|---|---|---|
| 8 | MF | EGY | Ali Ghazal (to (Canada) Vancouver Whitecaps) |
| 9 | FW | KEN | Michael Olunga (loan to (Spain) Girona) |
| 27 | DF | AUS | Ryan McGowan (to (United Arab Emirates) Al-Sharjah) |

=== Hebei China Fortune ===
In:

| No. | Pos. | Nation | Player |
|---|---|---|---|
| 61 | DF | CHN | Luan Haodong (from Qingdao Jonoon) |
| 62 | MF | CHN | Wang Wenhao (from Qingdao Jonoon) |
| 63 | MF | COD | Gaël Kakuta (loan return from (Spain) Deportivo La Coruña) |
| - | DF | TUR | Ersan Gülüm (loan return from (Turkey) Beşiktaş) |

Out:

| No. | Pos. | Nation | Player |
|---|---|---|---|
| 5 | DF | CHN | Du Wei (loan to Guizhou Zhicheng) |
| 10 | MF | BRA | Hernanes (loan to (Brazil) São Paulo) |
| 16 | DF | CHN | Liao Junjian (loan to Chongqing Lifan) |
| 55 | MF | CHN | Xu Jiajun (to (Belgium) Roeselare) |
| 58 | FW | CHN | Wu Yufan (to Qingdao Jonoon) |
| 63 | MF | COD | Gaël Kakuta (loan to (France) Amiens) |
| - | DF | TUR | Ersan Gülüm (loan to (Australia) Adelaide United) |

=== Henan Jianye ===
In:

| No. | Pos. | Nation | Player |
|---|---|---|---|
| 38 | FW | POR | Ricardo Vaz Tê (from (Turkey) Akhisar Belediyespor) |
| 57 | FW | SWE | Osman Sow (loan return from (United Arab Emirates) Emirates Club) |

Out:

| No. | Pos. | Nation | Player |
|---|---|---|---|
| 50 | DF | CHN | Li Yu (to Tianjin Quanjian) |
| 57 | FW | SWE | Osman Sow (to (England) Milton Keynes Dons) |

=== Jiangsu Suning ===
In:

| No. | Pos. | Nation | Player |
|---|---|---|---|
| 6 | DF | AUS | Trent Sainsbury (loan return from (Italy) Inter Milan) |
| 17 | FW | CHN | Erpan Ezimjan (Free agent) |
| 19 | DF | CHN | Huang Jiajun (from (Portugal) Oriental Dragon) |
| 38 | FW | CMR | Benjamin Moukandjo (from (France) Lorient) |

Out:

| No. | Pos. | Nation | Player |
|---|---|---|---|
| 14 | FW | CHN | Gu Wenxiang (to Meixian Techand) |
| 19 | DF | CHN | Huang Jiajun (loan return to (Portugal) Oriental Dragon) |

=== Liaoning FC ===
In:

| No. | Pos. | Nation | Player |
|---|---|---|---|
| 39 | FW | CMR | Olivier Boumal (from (Greece) Panathinaikos) |
| 40 | FW | CMR | Christian Bekamenga (from (Turkey) Balıkesirspor) |
| 61 | MF | CHN | Zhu Yongzhou (Free agent) |
| - | MF | CHN | He Yaqi (from (Portugal) Fabril) |

Out:

| No. | Pos. | Nation | Player |
|---|---|---|---|
| 19 | FW | CHN | Feng Boyuan (loan to (Croatia) NK Rudeš) |
| 23 | FW | AUS | Robbie Kruse (to (Germany) VfL Bochum) |
| 24 | MF | AUS | James Holland (to (Austria) LASK Linz) |

=== Shandong Luneng Taishan ===
In:

| No. | Pos. | Nation | Player |
|---|---|---|---|
| 7 | MF | CHN | Cui Peng (Free agent) |
| 31 | MF | CHN | Wei Jingzong (from (Portugal) Felgueiras) |
| 63 | DF | CHN | Zhang Dapeng (Free agent) |

Out:

| No. | Pos. | Nation | Player |
|---|---|---|---|
| 28 | GK | CHN | Zhou Yuchen (loan to (Hong Kong) R&F) |
| 42 | MF | CHN | Chen Kerui (loan to Baoding Yingli ETS) |
| 43 | FW | CHN | Bai Tianci (loan to Shanghai Shenxin) |
| 53 | MF | CHN | Tao Hongliang (to (Norway) Stabæk) |

=== Shanghai Greenland Shenhua ===
In:

| No. | Pos. | Nation | Player |
|---|---|---|---|
| 12 | GK | CHN | Chen Zhao (from (Portugal) Pozuelo Alarcón) |
| 33 | MF | CHN | Liu Jiawei (loan return from (Spain) La Roda) |
| 58 | MF | CHN | Geng Jiaqi (Free agent) |
| 59 | GK | CHN | Li Yangxin (Free agent) |
| 60 | MF | CHN | Hu Jiali (Free agent) |
| - | FW | SEN | Demba Ba (loan return from (Turkey) Beşiktaş) |
| - | FW | BRA | Paulo Henrique (loan return from (Brazil) Sport Recife) |

Out:

| No. | Pos. | Nation | Player |
|---|---|---|---|
| 20 | MF | CHN | Wang Yun (loan to Shanghai Shenxin) |
| 42 | DF | CHN | Xu Wu (to Chongqing Lifan) |
| - | FW | BRA | Paulo Henrique (to (Turkey) Akhisar Belediyespor) |

=== Shanghai SIPG ===
In:

| No. | Pos. | Nation | Player |
|---|---|---|---|
| - | FW | GHA | Asamoah Gyan (loan return from (United Arab Emirates) Al-Ahli) |

Out:

| No. | Pos. | Nation | Player |
|---|---|---|---|
| 20 | DF | CHN | Yang Fan (loan to (Japan) Grulla Morioka) |
| - | FW | GHA | Asamoah Gyan (to (Turkey) Kayserispor) |

=== Tianjin Quanjian ===
In:

| No. | Pos. | Nation | Player |
|---|---|---|---|
| 6 | DF | CHN | Pei Shuai (from Changchun Yatai) |
| 23 | DF | CHN | Qian Yumiao (Free agent) |
| 24 | MF | CHN | Zhang Yuan (from (Portugal) Loures) |
| 37 | FW | FRA | Anthony Modeste (loan from (Germany) 1. FC Köln) |
| 55 | MF | CHN | Cui Jiaqi (Free agent) |
| 58 | MF | CHN | He Youzu (Free agent) |
| 59 | MF | CHN | Dai Chunlei (from Shenzhen F.C.) |
| 60 | DF | CHN | Li Yu (from Henan Jianye) |

Out:

| No. | Pos. | Nation | Player |
|---|---|---|---|
| 9 | FW | BRA | Júnior Moraes (loan return to (Ukraine) Dynamo Kyiv) |
| 11 | FW | BRA | Geuvânio (loan to (Brazil) Flamengo) |

=== Tianjin Teda ===
In:

| No. | Pos. | Nation | Player |
|---|---|---|---|
| 7 | FW | GHA | Frank Acheampong (loan from (Belgium) Anderlecht) |
| - | DF | MOZ | Zainadine Júnior (loan return from (Portugal) Marítimo) |

Out:

| No. | Pos. | Nation | Player |
|---|---|---|---|
| 2 | MF | CHN | Huang Chuang (loan return to (Portugal) Gondomar) |
| 18 | FW | CHN | Zhou Liao (loan to Yinchuan Helanshan) |
| - | FW | GAB | Malick Evouna (loan to (Turkey) Konyaspor) |
| - | DF | MOZ | Zainadine Júnior (to (Portugal) Marítimo) |

=== Yanbian Funde ===
In:

| No. | Pos. | Nation | Player |
|---|---|---|---|
| 28 | FW | ALB | Valdet Rama (from (Germany) Würzburger Kickers) |
| 37 | DF | CHN | Yang Ailong (from (Portugal) Oriental Dragon) |
| 39 | FW | KOR | Hwang Il-su (from (South Korea) Jeju United) |

Out:

| No. | Pos. | Nation | Player |
|---|---|---|---|
| 9 | FW | KOR | Kim Seung-dae (to (South Korea) Pohang Steelers) |
| 14 | MF | KOR | Yoon Bit-garam (loan to (South Korea) Jeju United) |

== League One ==
=== Baoding Yingli ETS ===
In:

| No. | Pos. | Nation | Player |
|---|---|---|---|
| 10 | FW | HON | Rony Martínez (loan from (Honduras) Real Sociedad) |
| 31 | MF | CHN | Chen Kerui (loan from Shandong Luneng) |

Out:

| No. | Pos. | Nation | Player |
|---|---|---|---|
| - | FW | CHN | Su Junfeng (to (Australia) Northern Tigers) |

=== Beijing Enterprises ===
In:

| No. | Pos. | Nation | Player |
|---|---|---|---|
| 11 | FW | NGA | Victor Anichebe (from (England) Sunderland) |
| 65 | DF | CHN | Qin Cheng (loan from (Portugal) Torreense) |

Out:

| No. | Pos. | Nation | Player |
|---|---|---|---|
| 18 | FW | CHN | Xu Yihai (to Qingdao Jonoon) |
| 24 | MF | CIV | Cheick Tioté (Deceased) |

=== Beijing Renhe ===
In:

| No. | Pos. | Nation | Player |
|---|---|---|---|
| 35 | MF | CHN | Li Chenglong (loan return from (Belgium) Roeselare) |
| 37 | MF | CHN | Sun Weizhe (loan return from (Belgium) Roeselare) |

Out:

| No. | Pos. | Nation | Player |
|---|---|---|---|
| 21 | FW | CHN | Shen Tianfeng (loan to Jiangxi Liansheng) |
| - | GK | CHN | Lu Ning (loan to Dalian Boyoung) |

=== Dalian Transcendence ===
In:

| No. | Pos. | Nation | Player |
|---|---|---|---|
| 4 | MF | BIH | Eldar Hasanović (from (Israel) Maccabi Sha'arayim) |
| 6 | FW | CHN | Yang Fangzhi (loan from Dalian Yifang) |
| 61 | DF | CHN | He Huan (Free agent) |

Out:

| No. | Pos. | Nation | Player |
|---|---|---|---|
| 7 | FW | BRA | Jaílton Paraíba (to (Turkey) Gençlerbirliği) |

=== Dalian Yifang ===
In:

| No. | Pos. | Nation | Player |

Out:

| No. | Pos. | Nation | Player |
|---|---|---|---|
| 46 | FW | CHN | Yang Fangzhi (loan to Dalian Transcendence) |
| 48 | DF | CHN | Wu Yuyin (loan to Yinchuan Helanshan) |

=== Hangzhou Greentown ===
In:

| No. | Pos. | Nation | Player |
|---|---|---|---|
| 28 | DF | CHN | Yue Xin (loan return from (Denmark) Vejle BK) |

Out:

| No. | Pos. | Nation | Player |

=== Meizhou Hakka ===
In:

| No. | Pos. | Nation | Player |
|---|---|---|---|
| 8 | FW | CIV | Serges Déblé (from (Denmark) Viborg FF) |
| 61 | DF | CHN | Zhou Zihao (Free agent) |

Out:

| No. | Pos. | Nation | Player |
|---|---|---|---|
| 2 | DF | HKG | Lee Chi Ho (to (Hong Kong) Eastern) |
| 10 | FW | BUL | Valeri Bojinov (to (Switzerland) Lausanne-Sport) |

=== Nei Mongol Zhongyou ===
In:

| No. | Pos. | Nation | Player |
|---|---|---|---|
| 12 | MF | BRA | Davi (Free agent) |
| 26 | FW | CHN | Yin Congyao (Free agent) |
| 36 | FW | CHN | Merdan Ali (from Zhejiang Yiteng) |
| 39 | GK | CHN | Liu Shibo (loan from Guangzhou Evergrande) |
| 66 | MF | CHN | Song Ziwei (Free agent) |
| 67 | MF | CHN | Jiang Bin (Free agent) |
| 68 | GK | CHN | Su Yang (Free agent) |

Out:

| No. | Pos. | Nation | Player |
|---|---|---|---|
| 7 | FW | SEN | Malick Mané (to (Kazakhstan) Taraz) |

=== Qingdao Huanghai ===
In:

| No. | Pos. | Nation | Player |
|---|---|---|---|
| 61 | GK | CHN | Yang Jiatao (Free agent) |
| 66 | MF | CHN | Liang Kaiqiang (Free agent) |

Out:

| No. | Pos. | Nation | Player |
|---|---|---|---|
| 48 | MF | CHN | Li Yikai (to Hainan Boying) |

=== Shanghai Shenxin ===
In:

| No. | Pos. | Nation | Player |
|---|---|---|---|
| 32 | FW | CHN | Bai Tianci (loan from Shandong Luneng) |
| 33 | MF | CHN | Wang Yun (loan from Shanghai Shenhua) |

Out:

| No. | Pos. | Nation | Player |
|---|---|---|---|
| 29 | DF | CHN | Huang Wei (to (Portugal) Leixões) |

=== Shenzhen F.C. ===
In:

| No. | Pos. | Nation | Player |
|---|---|---|---|
| 7 | FW | BRA | Rossi (from (Brazil) Chapecoense) |
| 61 | FW | CHN | Wang Yicheng (Free agent) |
| 68 | GK | CHN | Dou Zhifu (Free agent) |

Out:

| No. | Pos. | Nation | Player |
|---|---|---|---|
| 10 | FW | NGA | Chinedu Obasi (to (Sweden) AIK) |
| 45 | MF | CHN | Yang Xinxin (to Shanghai Sunfun) |
| 53 | MF | CHN | Dai Chunlei (to Tianjin Quanjian) |
| - | GK | CHN | Wei Jian (loan to (Portugal) Sintrense) |

=== Shijiazhuang Ever Bright ===
In:

| No. | Pos. | Nation | Player |
|---|---|---|---|
| 61 | FW | CHN | Zhang Shuai (Free agent) |
| 62 | MF | CHN | Wang Zhipeng (Free agent) |

Out:

| No. | Pos. | Nation | Player |
|---|---|---|---|
| 27 | FW | CHN | Liu Ziming (loan to (Bulgaria) Neftochimic Burgas) |

=== Wuhan Zall ===
In:

| No. | Pos. | Nation | Player |
|---|---|---|---|
| 16 | MF | CRO | Sammir (from (Croatia) Dinamo Zagreb) |
| 38 | DF | CHN | Li Junfeng (from (Portugal) Gondomar) |

Out:

| No. | Pos. | Nation | Player |

=== Xinjiang Tianshan Leopard ===
In:

| No. | Pos. | Nation | Player |

Out:

| No. | Pos. | Nation | Player |
|---|---|---|---|
| - | MF | CHN | Abudunabi Adiljan (to Shenyang Dongjin) |

=== Yunnan Lijiang ===
In:

| No. | Pos. | Nation | Player |
|---|---|---|---|
| 30 | MF | CHN | Li Zhuangfei (loan from Qingdao Jonoon) |
| 31 | DF | CHN | Gao Xiaodong (Free agent) |
| 33 | FW | ESP | Natalio (from (Spain) UCAM Murcia) |
| 61 | GK | CHN | He Chaoping (Free agent) |
| 62 | DF | CHN | Guo Xuyingjiao (Free agent) |
| 63 | MF | CHN | Cheng Zecheng (Free agent) |
| 67 | DF | CHN | Zheng Guangqi (Free agent) |

Out:

| No. | Pos. | Nation | Player |

=== Zhejiang Yiteng ===
In:

| No. | Pos. | Nation | Player |
|---|---|---|---|
| 29 | FW | ITA | Federico Piovaccari (from (Spain) Córdoba) |

Out:

| No. | Pos. | Nation | Player |
|---|---|---|---|
| 9 | MF | CHN | Li Xin (loan to Jilin Baijia) |
| 11 | MF | CHN | Lü Yongdi (loan to Jilin Baijia) |
| 20 | MF | CHN | Lü Yuefeng (to (Romania) CFR Cluj) |
| 56 | FW | CHN | Merdan Ali (to Nei Mongol Zhongyou) |

== League Two ==
=== North League ===
==== Baotou Nanjiao ====
In:

| No. | Pos. | Nation | Player |
|---|---|---|---|
| 7 | FW | CHN | Almjan Abdugheni (Free agent) |

Out:

| No. | Pos. | Nation | Player |

==== Beijing BIT ====
In:

| No. | Pos. | Nation | Player |

Out:

| No. | Pos. | Nation | Player |

==== Dalian Boyoung ====
In:

| No. | Pos. | Nation | Player |
|---|---|---|---|
| 2 | DF | CHN | Wang Peng (from Heilongjiang Lava Spring) |
| 24 | GK | CHN | Lu Ning (loan from Beijing Renhe) |
| 25 | GK | CHN | Yang Fan (from Chengdu Qbao) |

Out:

| No. | Pos. | Nation | Player |

==== Hebei Elite ====
In:

| No. | Pos. | Nation | Player |

Out:

| No. | Pos. | Nation | Player |
|---|---|---|---|
| 23 | FW | CHN | Wu Linfeng (loan to (Brazil) Botafogo) |

==== Heilongjiang Lava Spring ====
In:

| No. | Pos. | Nation | Player |

Out:

| No. | Pos. | Nation | Player |
|---|---|---|---|
| 2 | DF | CHN | Wang Peng (to Dalian Boyoung) |

==== Jiangsu Yancheng Dingli ====
In:

| No. | Pos. | Nation | Player |

Out:

| No. | Pos. | Nation | Player |
|---|---|---|---|
| 9 | MF | CHN | Yang Wanshun (to Guangzhou R&F) |

==== Jilin Baijia ====
In:

| No. | Pos. | Nation | Player |
|---|---|---|---|
| 10 | MF | CHN | Xu Te (Free agent) |
| 12 | MF | CHN | Li Xin (loan from Zhejiang Yiteng) |
| 13 | MF | CHN | Xue Chen (from Hainan Boying) |
| 14 | MF | CHN | Zhang Bin (Free agent) |
| 18 | MF | CHN | Niu Luyuan (Free agent) |
| 25 | MF | CHN | Lü Yongdi (loan from Zhejiang Yiteng) |

Out:

| No. | Pos. | Nation | Player |

==== Qingdao Jonoon ====
In:

| No. | Pos. | Nation | Player |
|---|---|---|---|
| 9 | MF | CHN | Wang Ziming (loan from Beijing Sinobo Guoan) |
| 31 | FW | CHN | Xu Yihai (from Beijing BG) |
| 36 | FW | CHN | Wu Yufan (from Hebei China Fortune) |

Out:

| No. | Pos. | Nation | Player |
|---|---|---|---|
| 9 | MF | CHN | Wang Ziming (to Beijing Sinobo Guoan) |
| 16 | MF | CHN | Li Zhuangfei (loan to Yunan Lijiang) |
| 42 | DF | CHN | Luan Haodong (to Hebei China Fortune) |
| 44 | MF | CHN | Wang Wenhao (to Hebei China Fortune) |

==== Shaanxi Chang'an Athletic ====
In:

| No. | Pos. | Nation | Player |
|---|---|---|---|
| 6 | DF | CHN | Yan Shipeng (loan from Changchun Yatai) |
| 8 | MF | CHN | Li Wenxin (Free Agent) |
| 20 | MF | CHN | Yang Hao (Free Agent) |
| 22 | MF | CHN | Xu Xu (loan from (Spain) Granada) |
| 28 | FW | CHN | Wang Qi (from Hainan Boying) |
| 32 | MF | CHN | Han Deming (loan from Changchun Yatai) |
| 40 | MF | CHN | Cheng Yanbo (Free Agent) |

Out:

| No. | Pos. | Nation | Player |
|---|---|---|---|
| 33 | DF | CHN | Wang Mian (to Shenyang Dongjin) |

==== Shenyang Dongjin ====
In:

| No. | Pos. | Nation | Player |
|---|---|---|---|
| 9 | MF | CHN | Xing Kai (Free agent) |
| 12 | MF | CHN | Abudunabi Adiljan (from Xinjiang Tianshan Leopard) |
| 13 | DF | CHN | Han Weichen (Free agent) |
| 15 | DF | CHN | Wang Mian (from Shaanxi Chang'an Athletic) |
| 33 | DF | CHN | Xu Sen (Free agent) |

Out:

| No. | Pos. | Nation | Player |
|---|---|---|---|
| - | DF | CHN | Zhang Zijian (to Beijing Sinobo Guoan) |
| - | DF | CHN | Huang Tao (to Beijing Sinobo Guoan) |

==== Shenyang Urban ====
In:

| No. | Pos. | Nation | Player |

Out:

| No. | Pos. | Nation | Player |
|---|---|---|---|
| 3 | DF | CHN | Wang Bin (to (Belgium) Roeselare) |

==== Yinchuan Helanshan ====
In:

| No. | Pos. | Nation | Player |
|---|---|---|---|
| 7 | DF | CHN | Wu Yuyin (loan from Dalian Yifang) |
| 16 | GK | CHN | Liu Weiguo (loan from Guangzhou Evergrande Taobao) |
| 28 | FW | CHN | Zhou Liao (loan from Tianjin TEDA) |
| 39 | DF | CHN | Yuan Weiwei (Free agent) |

Out:

| No. | Pos. | Nation | Player |

=== South League ===
==== Chengdu Qbao ====
In:

| No. | Pos. | Nation | Player |
|---|---|---|---|
| 9 | MF | CHN | Hu Hao (Free agent) |
| 15 | DF | CHN | Zhu Benshuai (Free agent) |
| 30 | MF | CHN | Shi Haonan (Free agent) |

Out:

| No. | Pos. | Nation | Player |
|---|---|---|---|
| 25 | GK | CHN | Yang Fan (to Dalian Boyoung) |
| 26 | FW | CHN | Wei Chao (to (Portugal) CDC Montalegre) |

==== Hainan Boying ====
In:

| No. | Pos. | Nation | Player |
|---|---|---|---|
| 19 | MF | CHN | Li Yikai (from Qingdao Huanghai) |

Out:

| No. | Pos. | Nation | Player |
|---|---|---|---|
| 7 | FW | CHN | Wang Yunlong (to Nantong Zhiyun) |
| 10 | FW | CHN | Wang Qi (to Shaanxi Chang'an Athletic) |
| 17 | MF | CHN | Xue Chen (to Jilin Baijia) |
| 21 | DF | CHN | Cai Shun (to Zhenjiang Huasa) |

==== Hunan Billows ====
In:

| No. | Pos. | Nation | Player |
|---|---|---|---|
| 37 | MF | CHN | Chen Qi (loan return from (Croatia) NK Varaždin) |

Out:

| No. | Pos. | Nation | Player |

==== Jiangxi Liansheng ====
In:

| No. | Pos. | Nation | Player |
|---|---|---|---|
| 21 | FW | CHN | Shen Tianfeng (loan from Beijing Renhe) |
| 26 | MF | CHN | Yu Zhihao (Free agent) |
| 32 | MF | CHN | Li Qichao (Free agent) |

Out:

| No. | Pos. | Nation | Player |

==== Meizhou Meixian Techand ====
In:

| No. | Pos. | Nation | Player |
|---|---|---|---|
| 17 | FW | CHN | Gu Wenxiang (from Jiangsu Suning) |
| 38 | DF | CHN | Tu Dongxu (from Guangzhou R&F) |

Out:

| No. | Pos. | Nation | Player |

==== Nantong Zhiyun ====
In:

| No. | Pos. | Nation | Player |
|---|---|---|---|
| 13 | MF | CHN | Lü Jiahao (Free agent) |
| 25 | FW | CHN | Wang Yunlong (from Hainan Boying) |

Out:

| No. | Pos. | Nation | Player |

==== Shanghai JuJu Sports ====
In:

| No. | Pos. | Nation | Player |

Out:

| No. | Pos. | Nation | Player |

==== Shanghai Sunfun ====
In:

| No. | Pos. | Nation | Player |
|---|---|---|---|
| 16 | DF | CHN | Zhang Jiawei (Free agent) |
| 28 | MF | CHN | Liu Jiahao (Free agent) |
| 31 | MF | CHN | Yang Xinxin (from Shenzhen) |
| 33 | MF | CHN | Lai Jin (Free agent) |
| 35 | GK | CHN | Chen Shaohong (Free agent) |
| 36 | DF | CHN | Zhu Shilong (Free agent) |
| 37 | MF | CHN | Sun Zhengyang (from Chongqing Lifan) |

Out:

| No. | Pos. | Nation | Player |
|---|---|---|---|
| 26 | MF | CHN | Wang Kuanwei (Deceased) |

==== Shenzhen Ledman ====
In:

| No. | Pos. | Nation | Player |

Out:

| No. | Pos. | Nation | Player |

==== Sichuan Longfor ====
In:

| No. | Pos. | Nation | Player |
|---|---|---|---|
| 22 | GK | CHN | He Shengguo (Free agent) |

Out:

| No. | Pos. | Nation | Player |

==== Suzhou Dongwu ====
In:

| No. | Pos. | Nation | Player |

Out:

| No. | Pos. | Nation | Player |

==== Zhenjiang Huasa ====
In:

| No. | Pos. | Nation | Player |
|---|---|---|---|
| 2 | MF | CHN | Song Qi (Free agent) |
| 7 | FW | CHN | Zhang Jiabei (Free agent) |
| 11 | FW | CHN | He Lilong (Free agent) |
| 19 | FW | CHN | Dong Shaochen (Free agent) |
| 20 | DF | CHN | Cai Shun (from Hainan Boying) |
| 22 | GK | CHN | Chen Kang (Free agent) |

Out:

| No. | Pos. | Nation | Player |
