= Wuhan New Era F.C. =

Wuhan New Era Football Club 武汉新纪元足球俱乐部
- Full name: Wuhan New Era Football Club
- Founded: 2014
- Dissolved: 2016
- Ground: Zhongnan University of Economics and Law Stadium Wuhan
- Capacity: 30000
- Owner: Yang Dongqiang
- Chairman: Yang Dongqiang
- League: China Amateur Football League

Wuhan New Era Football Club (Chinese: 武汉新纪元足球俱乐部) was a Chinese football club based in Wuhan, Hubei Province, founded in 2014 and dissolved in 2016. They attended Chinese FA Cup in 2015.

== History ==
Wuhan New Era Football Club was founded by Yang Dongqiang on in 2014, attended China Amateur Football League in 2014 and achieved 14th place.

According to the rule of Chinese FA Cup, the club was not able to attend 2015 Chinese FA Cup. However, two football clubs which ranking was higher than them in China Amateur Football League in 2014 quit the 2015 Chinese FA Cup, leading to Wuhan New Era being eligible to participate.

In 2015 Chinese FA Cup, they first eliminated Guangxi Liuzhou Liuyue, another amateur team, then managed to upset China League One side Qingdao Hainiu with the score of 1–0, and advanced to the third round. However, they lost to Shandong Luneng Taishan there 1–6, despite their best efforts.

In 2015 China Amateur Football League, they won the North-West series, but the team did not attend the final round of the football league---Due to treatment issues, its players refused to attend the matches.

In 2016, Wuhan Chufeng Heli was formed from the ashes of Wuhan New Era and Wuhan Hongxing.

== 2015 Chinese FA Cup Squad ==
Note: Flags indicate national team as defined under FIFA eligibility rules; some limited exceptions apply. Players may hold more than one non-FIFA nationality.

No.	Pos.	Nation	Player
1		CHN	Hong Peng
2		CHN	Jin Xin
3		CHN	Pi Siwei
4		CHN	Zhang Mingjie
5		CHN	Peng Jing
9		CHN	Yang Dongqiang
12		CHN	Li Yajing
13		CHN	Zhang Yang
14		CHN	Wang Chi
15		CHN	Hou Wenzhe
16		CHN	Li Yang
17		CHN	Lü Xi
18		CHN	Si Jun
21		CHN	Zhang Xiaokai

No.	Pos.	Nation	Player
22		CHN	Wu Shaojing
23		CHN	Wei Xianjun
24		CHN	Li Fangqing
25		CHN	Wu Ze
26		CHN	Yu Chennan
27		CHN	Liu Bo
29		CHN	Dong Xiaoyang
34		CHN	Zhang Jicheng
35		CHN	Wang Wei
36		CHN	Peng Jie
37		CHN	Li Gui
38		CHN	Wang Zhigang
39		CHN	Li Fei
40		CHN	Wang Feng
