= Wang Peng =

Wang Peng is the name of:

- Wang Peng (footballer, born 1978), Chinese association footballer
- Wang Peng (footballer, born 1991), Chinese association footballer
- Wang Peng (footballer, born 1993), Chinese association footballer
- Wang Peng (footballer, born 1997), Chinese association footballer
- Wang Peng (lieutenant general), Chinese lieutenant general

== See also ==
- Wan Peng, Chinese actress
