= Pan Jinglue =

Chinese footballer

Personal information
- Full name: Pan Jinglüe
- Date of birth: 26 January 2008 (age 18)
- Place of birth: Anlu, Hubei, China
- Positions: Midfielder; right-back

Team information
- Current team: Hubei Istar
- Number: 13

Youth career
- 2018–2020: Xiaogan Youth Training Centre
- 2020–2026: Hubei Provincial Elite Squad

Senior career*
Years	Team	Apps	(Gls)
2026–	Hubei Istar	20	(0)

International career^{‡}
2024	China U16		
2026–	China U19		
- * Club domestic league appearances and goals as of 22 October 2026 ‡ National team caps and goals as of 22 October 2026

Pan Jinglue (Chinese: 潘景略; pinyin: Pān Jǐnglüè; born 26 January 2008) is a Chinese professional footballer who plays as a midfielder or right-back for China League Two club Hubei Istar.

== Early life and youth career ==
Pan Jinglue was born on 26 January 2008. He is from Anlu, Xiaogan, Hubei. He began playing football at the age of nine while attending Anlu City Experimental Primary School, initially as a goalkeeper in a school tournament. In 2018, he became one of the first members of the newly established Xiaogan Youth Training Centre. In August 2020, he was selected for the Hubei provincial under-12 elite squad.

== Club career ==
=== Hubei Istar ===
On 12 March 2026, Hubei Istar officially announced that Pan Jinglue was promoted to the first team, along with twelve other players from the Hubei U18 team, based on their performances at the 2025 National Games and the needs of the 2026 Three Major Ball Games preparation. He wore the number 13 shirt. On 25 April 2026, he made his professional league debut in the China League Two, coming on as a substitute in the 55th minute of a 1–0 away win against Jiangxi Lushan. On 11 October 2026, he provided the assist for Li Biao's equalising goal in a 1–1 draw against Dalian Yingbo B. By late September 2026, he had made 18 league appearances for the season, 12 of them as a starter, and had established himself as a regular at right-back.

== International career ==
In 2024, Pan Jinglue was selected for the China national under-16 team for the 2008 age group. In September 2026, he was called up to the China U19 national team for the fourth training camp of 2026, held from 20 September to 5 October at the National Football Training Base.

== Career statistics ==
=== Club ===
As of 22 October 2026

Appearances and goals by club, season and competition
Club	Season	League			National Cup		Continental		Other		Total	
Club	Season	Division	Apps	Goals	Apps	Goals	Apps	Goals	Apps	Goals	Apps	Goals
Hubei Istar	2026	China League Two	20	0	0	0	—		—		20	0
Career total			20	0	0	0	0	0	0	0	20	0

== Honours ==
Hubei U18

- Chinese Football Association Youth Championship runner-up: 2026

Individual

- Hubei Provincial Youth Football League U17–U18 Group Stage Round 3 Best Player: 2025
