= Wang Kai (footballer, born 1989) =

Chinese footballer

Wang Kai 王凯
Personal information
- Date of birth: 18 January 1989 (age 37)
- Place of birth: Wuhan, Hubei, China
- Height: 1.82 m (5 ft 11 1/2 in)
- Position: Midfielder

Youth career
- Qinhuangdao Football School
- Shaanxi Guoli
- Zhejiang Greentown

Senior career*
Years	Team	Apps	(Gls)
2007–2008	Hangzhou Sanchao		
2009–2013	Hangzhou Greentown	8	(0)
2017–2018	Zhejiang Yiteng	53	(3)
2019–2021	Wuhan Zall	40	(1)
2022	Wuhan Jiangcheng	6	(0)
2022	→ Liaoning Shenyang Urban (loan)	13	(0)
2023	Hubei Istar	9	(0)
- * Club domestic league appearances and goals as of 4 May 2022

Wang Kai (Chinese: 王凯; pinyin: Wáng Kǎi; born 18 January 1989 in Wuhan) was a Chinese football player.

== Club career ==
Wang received football training at Qinhuangdao Football School and Shaanxi Guoli before he joined Zhejiang Greentown youth team system in 2006. He started his professional career in 2007 when he was sent to China League Two side Hangzhou Sanchao (Zhejiang Greentown Youth). He was promoted to Hangzhou Greentown's first team squad by Zhou Suian in 2009. On 5 October 2009, he made his Super League debut in a 1–0 away defeat against Shandong Luneng Taishan, coming on as a substitute for Cai Chuchuan in the 86th minute. Wang failed to establish himself within the first team and was released at the end of 2013 season.

Wang played for amateur club Wuhan Hongxing between 2014 and 2016. Wuhan Hongxing involved in an on-field brawl in the third round of 2016 Chinese FA Cup and was banned from all future matches organised by the Chinese Football Association in May 2016. Wang was one of the few Wuhan players not to participate the brawl. He joined another amateur club Wuhan Chufeng Heli in July 2016.

On 24 January 2017, Wang returned to professional football and moved to China League One side Zhejiang Yiteng. He made his debut for the club on 11 March 2017 in a 1–0 home win over Xinjiang Tianshan Leopard, coming on as a substitute for injury Romeo Castelen in the 24th minute.

On 24 January 2019, Wang transferred to his hometown club of Wuhan Zall, who were newly promoted to the first-tier. He would make his debut on 1 March 2019 against Beijing Sinobo Guoan F.C. in a league game that ended in a 1-0 defeat.

== Career statistics ==
Statistics accurate as of match played 31 December 2020.

Appearances and goals by club, season and competition
Club	Season	League			National Cup		Continental		Other		Total	
Club	Season	Division	Apps	Goals	Apps	Goals	Apps	Goals	Apps	Goals	Apps	Goals
Hangzhou Sanchao	2007	China League Two			-		-		-			
Hangzhou Sanchao	2008	China League Two			-		-		-			
Hangzhou Sanchao	Total				0	0	0	0	0	0		
Hangzhou Greentown	2009	Chinese Super League	2	0	-		-		-		2	0
Hangzhou Greentown	2010	Chinese Super League	0	0	-		-		-		0	0
Hangzhou Greentown	2011	Chinese Super League	0	0	0	0	0	0	-		0	0
Hangzhou Greentown	2012	Chinese Super League	6	0	1	0	-		-		7	0
Hangzhou Greentown	2013	Chinese Super League	0	0	1	0	-		-		1	0
Hangzhou Greentown	Total		8	0	2	0	0	0	0	0	10	0
Wuhan Hongxing	2015	Amateur League	-		3	1	-		-		3	1
Wuhan Hongxing	2016	Amateur League	-		3	0	-		-		3	0
Wuhan Hongxing	Total		0	0	6	1	0	0	0	0	6	1
Zhejiang Yiteng	2017	China League One	24	1	1	0	-		-		25	1
Zhejiang Yiteng	2018	China League One	29	2	0	0	-		-		29	2
Zhejiang Yiteng	Total		53	3	1	0	0	0	0	0	54	3
Wuhan Zall	2019	Chinese Super League	20	1	1	0	-		-		21	0
Wuhan Zall	2020	Chinese Super League	18	0	1	0	-		2 (Note: Appearance(s) in CSL Relegation play-offs)	0	21	0
Wuhan Zall	Total		38	1	2	0	0	0	2	0	42	1
Career total			99	4	11	1	0	0	2	0	112	5
