= Wuhan Hongxing–Jiangsu Suning brawl =

2016 football match in China

Wuhan Hongxing vs Jiangsu Suning
- Event: 2016 Chinese FA Cup
| Wuhan Hongxing | Jiangsu Suning |
| 0 | 3 |
- Match originally ended with the final score Jiangsu 1–0 Wuhan; Suning awarded a 3–0 victory Bairun banned from all future matches
- Date: 11 May 2016
- Venue: Hankou Cultural Sports Centre, Wuhan
- Referee: Kou Jianxun (Dalian)
- Attendance: 7,315
- Weather: Sunny

On 11 May 2016, a 2016 Chinese FA Cup third round match involving the amateur club Wuhan Hongxing Bairun F.C. and the Chinese Super League club Jiangsu Suning F.C. took place at Hankou Cultural Sports Centre, in Wuhan, China. Jiangsu Suning won by a single goal while striker Ge Wei scored in the 7th minute of the stoppage time, but the game was best remembered for a brawl following the final whistle. Wuhan Hongxing Bairun F.C. was banned from all future matches organised by the Chinese Football Association. Six players and two staff of Wuhan received a life ban from football after the incident.

== Match ==
=== Details ===
11 May 2016
15:00 UTC+8

| Wuhan Hongxing Bairun | 0–3 Awarded | Jiangsu Suningyi Purchase |
|---|---|---|
| | | Ge Wei 90+7' |

Hankou Cultural Sports Centre, Wuhan
Attendance: 7,315
Referee: Kou Jianxun (Dalian)

| GK | 1 | (China) Cao Xibo | (yellow card) 75' |
| DF | 2 | (China) Zhang Weijun ^{1} |
| DF | 5 | (China) Rao Yao ^{1} |
| FW | 9 | (China) Zhou Yi (c) |
| | 14 | (China) Zhu Cheng ^{1} | (yellow card) 18' | (substituted off) 76' |
| | 17 | (China) Li Xin | (yellow card) 23' |
| | 22 | (China) Cai Lei | (yellow card) 90+3' |
| MF | 24 | (China) Wang Kai | (yellow card) 29' |
| | 26 | (China) Yan Qi ^{1} | | (substituted off) 60' |
| DF | 29 | (China) Jin Xin ^{1} | (yellow card) 76' |
| FW | 30 | (China) Li Wenqiang ^{1} | (yellow card) 66' | (substituted off) 90+1' |
Substitutes:
| GK | 31 | (China) Xia Yong |
| FW | 7 | (China) Huang Lei | | (substituted on) 90+1' |
| FW | 11 | (China) Chen Hao | (red card) 90+6' |
| | 21 | (China) Xu Ling |
| | 23 | (China) Li Dongxu | (yellow card) 63' | (substituted on) 60' |
| | 25 | (China) Zhang Xiaolong ^{1} | | (substituted on) 76' |
| | 27 | (China) Chen Zhengxing |
Coach:
(China) Lü Shouhua

| GK | 1 | (China) Gu Chao |
| CB | 17 | (China) Xu Youzhi |
| CB | 8 | (China) Liu Jianye | | (substituted off) 82' |
| CB | 23 | (China) Ren Hang (c) |
| RWB | 5 | (China) Zhou Yun | (yellow card) 90+2' |
| LWB | 28 | (China) Yang Xiaotian |
| CM | 29 | (China) Yang Jiawei |
| CM | 22 | (China) Wu Xi |
| CM | 20 | (China) Zhang Xinlin |
| CF | 11 | (China) Xie Pengfei | | (substituted off) 60' |
| CF | 14 | (China) Qu Cheng | | (substituted off) 76' |
Substitutes:
| GK | 30 | (China) Zhang Sipeng |
| DF | 2 | (China) Li Ang |
| DF | 32 | (China) Liu Wei |
| MF | 12 | (China) Zhang Xiaobin | | (substituted on) 82' |
| MF | 13 | (China) Tao Yuan |
| MF | 33 | (China) Gu Wenxiang | | (substituted on) 76' |
| FW | 40 | (China) Ge Wei | (yellow card) 90+7' | (substituted on) 60' |
Coach:
(Romania) Dan Petrescu

Assistant referees:
Zhao Gang (Chengdu)
Shen Pengxiang (Yunnan)
Fourth official:
Yang Nan (Dalian)

- ^1 Zhang Weijun, Rao Yao, Zhu Cheng, Yan Qi, Jin Xin, Li Wenqiang and Zhang Xiaolong were ineligible to play for Wuhan Hongxing. They used the ID of Zhou Rui, Wei Xianjun, Si Jun, Li Fangqing, Lu Lei, Li Yajing and Hou Wenzhe correspondingly to sign up for the match.

=== Summary and brawl ===
According to the regulations of Chinese FA Cup, only native players could play in this match. Without Alex Teixeira, Ramires, Jô, Sammir and Trent Sainsbury, Jiangsu Suning found it hard to fashion a goal-scoring chance with Wuhan Hongxing's intense defense and time-wasting techniques. Dan Petrescu, manager of Jiangsu Suning, was sent to the stands in the 69th minute for unsportsmanlike conduct when he objected to Wuhan Hongxing's time-wasting. Wuhan Hongxing also received numerous yellow cards and hoped to make the match go into the penalty shoot-out. However, Jiangsu striker Ge Wei, who came on as a substitute in the second half, scored in the 7th minute of stoppage time as Jiangsu edged Wuhan Hongxing 1–0 and advanced to the next round.

Players and staff of Wuhan Hongxing lost control and attacked their counterparts following the final whistle. Jiangsu's Xie Pengfei was thrown to the ground by several Wuhan players, while scorer Ge Wei was injured on his rib with scratches; many other Jiangsu players also suffered injuries in the melee. Some reporters from Jiangsu were also assaulted in the incident as fans in the stands hurled bottles at the players of Jiangsu. Jiangsu staff member Wu Bo, who was recording the match, was beaten up in the stand by a group of unidentified people. Petrescu was also hit by a hard object in the stand. Jiangsu Suning were later escorted to Wuhan Railway Station under police protection.

== Post-match and aftermath ==
Jiangsu Suning left Wuhan on a high-speed train immediately after the match. The officials of Wuhan Hongxing condemned the brawl and vowed to punish the players involved later that day. They also emphasized that the cause of the brawl could not be ascribed to Wuhan only as they believed the goal celebration of Jiangsu was a deliberate provocation. On 12 May 2016, Wuhan Hongxing issued an apology to Jiangsu and announced that five plays involved in the brawl had been sacked by the club. However, Wuhan Hongxing was exposed to use ineligible players in the match on the same day. At first, Wuhan's player Lu Lei was found replacing by Jin Xin, who used to play for China national U-22 team. More information of ineligible players was exposed by Sina Weibo celebrity Asaikana later that night. Six starters of Wuhan Hongxing were found replacing by ineligible players.

== Ruling ==
On 13 May 2016, the Chinese Football Association (CFA) opened a disciplinary hearing. Huang Chenggao, general manager of Wuhan Hongxing, admitted the attacking as well as using ineligible players in the match. CFA didn't establish any conclusive punishment in the meeting.

On 20 May 2016, CFA announced the survey results and rulings. They confirmed Wuhan Hongxing used ineligible players and attacked the players and staff of Jiangsu Suning in the match, which violated Article 11, 12, 13, 38, 55, 61, 66 and 101 of the Discipline Code of Chinese Football Association. Zhang Weijun, Zhang Xiaolong, Li Wenqiang and Jin Xin, who were ineligible to play for Wuhan Hongxing, was accused of attacking behaviour and using eligible players' identity. Two staff of Wuhan Hongxing (Zhang Zhen and Tian Jing) and six players (Cai Lei, Li Xin, Xu Ling, Cao Xibo, Li Dongxu and Chen Hao) were accused of attacking behaviour. Seven players of Wuhan Hongxing, including Zhou Rui, Wei Xianjun, Si Jun, Li Fangqing, Lu Lei, Li Yajing and Hou Wenzhe, was accused of providing eligible identity to ineligible players for the match. Three ineligible players including Zhu Cheng, Yan Qi and Rao Yao was accused of using eligible players' identity.

Jiangsu was awarded a 3–0 win. Wuhan Hongxing Bairun F.C. was fined 200,000 RMB and banned from all future matches organised by the CFA. Six players (Zhang Weijun, Zhang Xiaolong, Li Wenqiang, Jin Xin, Cai Lei and Li Xin) and two staff (Zhang Zhen and Tian Jing) of Wuhan received a life ban from football, four players (Xu Ling, Cao Xibo, Li Dongxu and Chen Hao) of Wuhan received a 36-month ban (from 12 May 2016 to 11 May 2019) from football and ten players (Zhou Rui, Wei Xianjun, Si Jun, Li Fangqing, Lu Lei, Li Yajing, Hou Wenzhe, Zhu Cheng, Yan Qi and Rao Yao) of Wuhan received a 24-month ban (from 12 May 2016 to 11 May 2018) from football.
