= Jin Xin =

Chinese footballer

Jin Xin 金鑫
Personal information
- Date of birth: 4 September 1991 (age 35)
- Place of birth: Wuhan, Hubei, China
- Height: 1.80 m (5 ft 11 in)
- Position: Defender

Senior career*
Years	Team	Apps	(Gls)
2010–2014	Wuhan Zall	10	(0)
2012	→ Hubei China-Kyle (loan)	24	(0)
2014	→ Sichuan Leaders (loan)	3	(1)

International career
2012	China U-22		
- * Club domestic league appearances and goals as of 14 May 2016

Jin Xin (Chinese: 金鑫; pinyin: Jīn Xīn; born 4 September 1991) is a former Chinese footballer.

== Club career ==
Jin Xin started his professional career in 2010 when he was promoted to China League One side Hubei Luyin's first team squad. He made his senior debut on 21 August 2010, in a 1–0 away defeat against Yanbian FC, coming on as a substitute for Li Hang in the 87th minute. Jin was loaned to China League Two side Hubei China-Kyle in the 2012 season. He played a regular starter and made 24 appearances as Hubei China-Kyle won promotion to the second tier after finished runners-up in the league. Jin returned to Wuhan Zall (rename of Hubei Greenery) for the 2013 Chinese Super League campaign. On 1 July 2013, he made his Super League debut in a 4–1 home loss against Guangzhou Evergrande, coming on as a substitute for Zhou Heng in the 77th minute. Jin was loaned out to China League Two side Sichuan Leaders in 2014. He returned to Wuhan in the summer and was released in the end of the season.

== Wuhan Hongxing–Jiangsu Suning brawl incident ==
Jin played for amateur football teams in Wuhan after he was released. On 11 May 2016, he was involved in an on-field brawl in the third round of 2016 Chinese FA Cup which Wuhan Hongxing played against Jiangsu Suning. He was ineligible to play for Wuhan Hongxing, but he used an eligible player's identity to play in this match. He also attacked Jiangsu Suning's players following the final whistle after Wuhan Hongxing lost 1–0 with a stoppage time goal. Jin received a life ban from football for his behaviour by the Chinese Football Association on 20 May 2016.

== Career statistics ==
As of 23 May 2016

Club performance			League		Cup		League Cup		Continental		Total	
Season	Club	League	Apps	Goals	Apps	Goals	Apps	Goals	Apps	Goals	Apps	Goals
China PR			League		FA Cup		CSL Cup		Asia		Total	
2010	Hubei Luyin	China League One	2	0	-		-		-		2	0
2011	Hubei Luyin	China League One	2	0	1	0	-		-		3	0
2012	Hubei China-Kyle	China League Two	24	0	0	0	-		-		24	0
2013	Wuhan Zall	Chinese Super League	6	0	0	0	-		-		6	0
2014	Sichuan Leaders	China League Two	3	1	0	0	-		-		3	1
2014	Wuhan Zall	China League One	0	0	0	0	-		-		0	0
2015	Wuhan New Era	Amateur League	-		2	1	-		-		2	1
2016	Wuhan Hongxing	Amateur League	-		1	0	-		-		1	0
Career total			37	1	4	1	0	0	0	0	41	2
