= Wan Houliang =

Chinese footballer (born 1986)

Wan Houliang 万厚良
Personal information
- Full name: Wan Houliang
- Date of birth: 25 February 1986 (age 40)
- Place of birth: Beijing, China
- Height: 1.87 m (6 ft 2 in)
- Position: Defender

Team information
- Current team: Hubei Istar (head coach)

Youth career
- 2001–2002: Beijing Huaya Feiying
- 2002–2004: ČSK Čelarevo

Senior career*
Years	Team	Apps	(Gls)
2005–2014	Guizhou Renhe	112	(12)
2009	→ Jeonbuk Hyundai (loan)	4	(0)
2015–2016	Qingdao Huanghai	56	(2)
2017–2020	Beijing Renhe	84	(4)

International career^{‡}
2008	China U23	25	(0)
2008–2009	China	2	(0)

Managerial career
- 2022–2023: China U23 (assistant)
- 2024–2025: China U19 (assistant)
- 2025: China (assistant)
- 2026–: Hubei Istar
- * Club domestic league appearances and goals as of 20:40,31 December 2019 (UTC) ‡ National team caps and goals as of 2:41, 10 December 2011 (UTC)

Wan Houliang (simplified Chinese: 万厚良; traditional Chinese: 萬厚良; pinyin: Wàn Hòuliáng; born 25 February 1986) is a Chinese former international footballer who played as a defender.

== Club career ==
Wan Houliang would start his career playing for his hometown club Beijing Huaya Feiying's youth team before going on a football training course in Serbia where he played for third tier side FK ČSK Čelarevo's youth and reserve team. In 2004, Wan would return to China and signed a contract with top tier side Shanghai COSCO Sanlin (later known as Shaanxi Baorong Chanba). On 24 April 2005, he would make his first professional senior appearance in the Chinese Super League, in a Shanghai Derby match which Inter Shanghai played against Shanghai Shenhua in a 1-0 defeat. Despite the loss Wan would become a rising star within the team under manager Cheng Yaodong and even go on to score his debut goal in a league match against Beijing Guoan on September 11, 2005 in a 3-1 defeat.

On 13 July 2009, it was revealed that Wan will join K-League club Jeonbuk Hyundai Motors on loan for the second half of 2009 season. On 26 July 2009, Wan Houliang made his debut for Jeonbuk in a 1-1 draw at Ulsan Hyundai Horang-i. On 7 October 2009, he scored an own goal, at the Korean FA Cup Semi-finals against Suwon Samsung Bluewings in a 0-4 loss. While Wan was unable to make a significant impact during his time with the club he would still aid them in their league title win.

Wan returned to Shaanxi for pre-season training ahead of 2010 season. On 3 March, he suffered a leg fracture during a friendly match against Hangzhou Greentown, ruling him out for the rest of the season. On 13 February 2015, Wan transferred to China League One side Qingdao Hainiu.

In January 2017, Wan returned to Beijing Renhe in the China League One.

== International career ==
Wan Was selected in the China national under-23 football team that took part in the 2008 Summer Olympics where he played in two group games. Wan Houliang made his senior debut in a 2008 friendly against Iran in a 2-0 loss coming on as a substitute.

== Coaching Career ==
On 4 February 2026, Wan was named as the head coach of China League Two club Hubei Istar.

== Career statistics ==
Statistics accurate as of match played 31 December 2019.

Appearances and goals by club, season and competition
Club	Season	League			National Cup		League Cup		Continental		Total	
Club	Season	Division	Apps	Goals	Apps	Goals	Apps	Goals	Apps	Goals	Apps	Goals
Guizhou Renhe	2005	Chinese Super League	18	1	3	0	1	0	-		22	1
Guizhou Renhe	2006	Chinese Super League	11	0	3	0	-		-		14	0
Guizhou Renhe	2007	Chinese Super League	22	3	-		-		-		22	3
Guizhou Renhe	2008	Chinese Super League	19	1	-		-		-		19	1
Guizhou Renhe	2009	Chinese Super League	14	2	-		-		-		14	2
Guizhou Renhe	2010	Chinese Super League	0	0	-		-		-		0	0
Guizhou Renhe	2011	Chinese Super League	19	4	2	0	-		-		21	4
Guizhou Renhe	2012	Chinese Super League	0	0	0	0	-		-		0	0
Guizhou Renhe	2013	Chinese Super League	6	1	0	0	-		0	0	6	1
Guizhou Renhe	2014	Chinese Super League	3	0	0	0	-		3	0	6	0
Guizhou Renhe	Total		112	12	8	0	1	0	3	0	124	12
Jeonbuk Hyundai Motors (loan)	2009	K-League	4	0	1	0	0	0	-		5	0
Qingdao Hainiu	2015	China League One	28	0	0	0	-		-		28	0
Qingdao Hainiu	2016	China League One	28	2	0	0	-		-		28	2
Qingdao Hainiu	Total		56	2	0	0	0	0	0	0	56	2
Beijing Renhe	2017	China League One	22	2	0	0	-		-		22	2
Beijing Renhe	2018	Chinese Super League	27	1	2	0	-		-		29	1
Beijing Renhe	2019	Chinese Super League	17	0	0	0	-		-		17	0
Beijing Renhe	Total		66	3	2	0	0	0	0	0	68	3
Career total			238	17	11	0	1	0	3	0	253	17

== Honours ==
=== Club ===
Jeonbuk Hyundai

- K-League: 2009

Guizhou Renhe

- Chinese FA Cup: 2013
- Chinese FA Super Cup: 2014
