= Huang Jiajun =

Chinese footballer

Personal information
- Date of birth: 19 August 1995 (age 31)
- Place of birth: Shenzhen, Guangdong, China
- Height: 1.91 m (6 ft 3 in)
- Position: Defender

Team information
- Current team: Shenzhen Juniors
- Number: 14

Senior career*
Years	Team	Apps	(Gls)
2015	SG Sacavenense	2	(0)
2015–2017	Clube Oriental de Lisboa	0	(0)
2015–2017	→ Pinhalnovense (loan)	29	(0)
2017–2020	Jiangsu Suning	1	(0)
2021	Sichuan Minzu	16	(4)
2022	Shijiazhuang Gongfu	26	(1)
2023–2024	Suzhou Dongwu	39	(0)
2025–	Shenzhen Juniors	9	(0)

International career^{‡}
2014	China U19	2	(1)
- * Club domestic league appearances and goals as of 23 April 2022 ‡ National team caps and goals as of 7 September 2014

Huang Jiajun (simplified Chinese: 黄嘉俊; traditional Chinese: 黃嘉俊; pinyin: Huáng Jiājùn; born 19 August 1995) is a Chinese professional footballer who plays as a defender for Shenzhen Juniors.

== Club career ==
Huang Jiajun would go abroad to Portugal to further his football development and would join third-tier club SG Sacavenense where he would make his senior debut in a league game on 12 October 2014 against Sintrense in a 2-1 defeat. After a loan move to another Portuguese team in Pinhalnovense, Huang would return to China when he joined top tier club Jiangsu Suning on 24 February 2017.

== Career statistics ==
As of 31 December 2020.

Club	Season	League			Cup		Continental		Other		Total	
Club	Season	Division	Apps	Goals	Apps	Goals	Apps	Goals	Apps	Goals	Apps	Goals
SG Sacavenense	2014–15	Campeonato de Portugal	2	0	0	0	–		–		2	0
Pinhalnovense (loan)	2015–16	Campeonato de Portugal	13	0	0	0	–		–		13	0
Pinhalnovense (loan)	2016–17	Campeonato de Portugal	16	0	0	0	–		–		16	0
Pinhalnovense (loan)	Total		29	0	0	0	0	0	0	0	29	0
Jiangsu Suning	2017	Chinese Super League	1	0	0	0	–		0 (Note: Appearances in Chinese FA Super Cup)	0	1	0
Jiangsu Suning	2018	Chinese Super League	0	0	0	0	–		–		0	0
Jiangsu Suning	2019	Chinese Super League	0	0	0	0	–		–		0	0
Jiangsu Suning	Total		1	0	0	0	0	0	0	0	32	0
Career total			32	0	0	0	0	0	0	0	32	0
