= Li Hao (footballer, born 1992) =

Chinese footballer

Li Hao 리호 李浩
Personal information
- Date of birth: 29 January 1992 (age 34)
- Place of birth: Helong, Jilin, China
- Height: 1.73 m (5 ft 8 in)
- Position: Midfielder

Team information
- Current team: Hebei China Fortune
- Number: 18

Senior career*
Years	Team	Apps	(Gls)
2011–2018	Yanbian FC	67	(0)
2019	Yanbian Beiguo	12	(4)
2020–	Hebei China Fortune	1	(0)
- * Club domestic league appearances and goals as of 31 December 2020

Li Hao
- Simplified Chinese: 李浩
Transcriptions
Standard Mandarin
- Hanyu Pinyin: Lǐ Hào
- IPA: [lì xâʊ]

Chinese Korean name
- Chosŏn'gŭl: 리호
Transcriptions
- Revised Romanization: Ri Ho
- McCune–Reischauer: Ri Ho

Li Hao (Chinese: 李浩; Korean: 리호; born 29 January 1992) is a Chinese footballer who currently plays for Chinese Super League side Hebei China Fortune.

== Club career ==
Li Hao started his professional football career in 2011 when he was promoted to Yanbian FC's first squad. On 15 April 2016, he made his debut for Yanbian FC in the 2016 Chinese Super League against Shandong Luneng, coming on as a substitute for Pei Yuwen in the 86th minute.

== Career statistics ==
Statistics accurate as of match played 31 December 2020.

Club performance			League		Cup		League Cup		Continental		Total	
Club	Season	League	Apps	Goals	Apps	Goals	Apps	Goals	Apps	Goals	Apps	Goals
Yanbian FC	2011	China League One	5	0	0	0	-		-		5	0
Yanbian FC	2012	China League One	2	0	1	0	-		-		3	0
Yanbian FC	2013	China League One	22	0	0	0	-		-		22	0
Yanbian FC	2014	China League One	12	0	1	0	-		-		13	0
Yanbian FC	2015	China League One	6	0	2	0	-		-		8	0
Yanbian FC	2016	Chinese Super League	12	0	0	0	-		-		12	0
Yanbian FC	2017	Chinese Super League	6	0	1	0	-		-		7	0
Yanbian FC	2018	China League One	2	0	1	0	-		-		3	0
Yanbian FC	Total		67	0	6	0	0	0	0	0	73	0
Yanbian Beiguo	2019	China League Two	12	4	0	0	-		-		12	4
Hebei China Fortune	2020	Chinese Super League	1	0	0	0	-		-		1	0
Career total			80	4	6	0	0	0	0	0	86	4

== Honours ==
=== Club ===
Yanbian FC

- China League One: 2015
