= Tao Yuan (footballer) =

Chinese footballer

Tao Yuan 陶源
Personal information
- Full name: Tao Yuan
- Date of birth: 18 January 1993 (age 33)
- Place of birth: Anqing, Anhui, China
- Height: 1.79 m (5 ft 10 in)
- Position: Midfielder

Youth career
- Jiangsu Sainty

Senior career*
Years	Team	Apps	(Gls)
2011–2012	Jiangsu Youth	31	(5)
2014–2020	Jiangsu Suning	42	(1)
2021	Nanjing City	4	(0)
2022–2024	Shenzhen Peng City	0	(0)
2022	→ Guangxi Pingguo Haliao (loan)	7	(0)
2023	→ Qingdao Red Lions (loan)	17	(2)
2024	→ Guangxi Pingguo Haliao (loan)	4	(0)
2025	Qingdao Red Lions	6	(0)

International career
2014	China U23	2	(0)
- * Club domestic league appearances and goals as of 29 April 2022

Tao Yuan (Chinese: 陶源; pinyin: Táo Yuán; born 18 January 1993 in Anqing, Anhui) is a Chinese footballer.

== Club career ==
Tao Yuan started his football career with Jiangsu Sainty during the 2014 season after playing for Jiangsu Youth during the 2011 season and the 2012 season. On 15 July 2014, Tao made his debut for Jiangsu Sainty in the third round of 2014 Chinese FA Cup which Jiangsu beat Hunan Billows 2–1. Tao made his Super League debut fours days later, in a 3–2 defeat against Guangzhou R&F. He scored his first goal for Jiangsu on 23 July 2014, which ensured Jiangsu Sainty beat Lijiang Jiayunhao 2–1.

== Career statistics ==
Statistics accurate as of match played 22 October 2023.

Appearances and goals by club, season and competition
Club	Season	League			National Cup		Continental		Other		Total	
Club	Season	Division	Apps	Goals	Apps	Goals	Apps	Goals	Apps	Goals	Apps	Goals
Jiangsu Youth	2011	China League Two	11	1	-		-		-		11	1
Jiangsu Youth	2012	China League Two	20	4	-		-		-		20	4
Jiangsu Youth	Total		31	5	0	0	0	0	0	0	31	5
Jiangsu Suning	2014	Chinese Super League	10	0	5	1	-		-		15	1
Jiangsu Suning	2015	Chinese Super League	3	1	1	0	-		-		4	1
Jiangsu Suning	2016	Chinese Super League	5	0	3	0	1	0	0 (Note: Appearances in Chinese FA Super Cup)	0	9	0
Jiangsu Suning	2017	Chinese Super League	23	0	2	0	6	0	1	0	32	0
Jiangsu Suning	2018	Chinese Super League	1	0	0	0	-		-		1	0
Jiangsu Suning	Total		42	1	11	1	7	0	1	0	61	2
Nanjing City	2021	China League One	4	0	0	0	-		-		4	0
Sichuan Jiuniu/ Shenzhen Peng City	2022	China League One	0	0	1	0	-		-		1	0
Sichuan Jiuniu/ Shenzhen Peng City	2024	Chinese Super League	0	0	0	0	-		-		0	0
Sichuan Jiuniu/ Shenzhen Peng City	Total		0	0	1	0	0	0	0	0	1	0
Guangxi Pingguo Haliao (loan)	2022	China League One	7	0	1	1	-		-		8	1
Qingdao Red Lions (loan)	2023	China League Two	17	2	1	0	-		-		18	2
Career total			101	8	14	2	7	0	1	0	123	10

== Honours ==
=== Club ===
Jiangsu Sainty

- Chinese FA Cup: 2015
