= Zhang Xinlin =

Chinese footballer

Zhang Xinlin 张新林
Personal information
- Full name: Zhang Xinlin
- Date of birth: June 4, 1992 (age 34)
- Place of birth: Nanjing, Jiangsu, China
- Height: 1.80 m (5 ft 11 in)
- Position: Midfielder

Team information
- Current team: Nanjing City
- Number: 4

Youth career
- Jiangsu Sainty

Senior career*
Years	Team	Apps	(Gls)
2011–2012	Jiangsu Youth	33	(1)
2014–2019	Jiangsu Suning	20	(1)
2019	→ Taizhou Yuanda (loan)	33	(11)
2020	Taizhou Yuanda	15	(2)
2021–	Nanjing City	81	(17)
- * Club domestic league appearances and goals as of 18 November 2023

Zhang Xinlin (Chinese: 张新林; born 4 June 1992) is a Chinese professional footballer who plays as a midfielder for and captains China League One club Nanjing City.

== Club career ==
In 2014, Zhang Xinlin started his professional footballer career with Jiangsu Sainty in the Chinese Super League. He made his Super league debut on 25 May 2014 in a game against Shanghai East Asia, coming on as a substitute for Ji Xiang in the 86th minute. He was sent to the Suning reserved team in 2018. On 23 February 2019, Zhang was loaned to League Two newcomer Taizhou Yuanda for the 2019 season.

On 15 April 2021, Zhang would transfer to another China League One club in Nanjing City.

== Career statistics ==
Statistics accurate as of match played 18 November 2023.

Appearances and goals by club, season and competition
Club	Season	League			National Cup		Continental		Other		Total	
Club	Season	Division	Apps	Goals	Apps	Goals	Apps	Goals	Apps	Goals	Apps	Goals
Jiangsu Youth	2011	China League Two	13	1	-		-		-		13	1
Jiangsu Youth	2012	China League Two	20	0	-		-		-		20	0
Jiangsu Youth	Total		33	1	0	0	0	0	0	0	33	1
Jiangsu Sainty/ Jiangsu Suning	2014	Chinese Super League	6	0	3	0	-		-		9	0
Jiangsu Sainty/ Jiangsu Suning	2015	Chinese Super League	8	1	4	1	-		-		12	2
Jiangsu Sainty/ Jiangsu Suning	2016	Chinese Super League	6	0	5	0	4	0	1 (Note: Appearances in Chinese FA Super Cup)	0	16	0
Jiangsu Sainty/ Jiangsu Suning	2017	Chinese Super League	0	0	0	0	1	0	0	0	1	0
Jiangsu Sainty/ Jiangsu Suning	Total		20	1	12	1	4	0	2	0	38	2
Taizhou Yuanda (loan)	2019	China League Two	33	11	5	0	-		-		38	11
Taizhou Yuanda	2020	China League One	15	2	1	0	-		-		16	2
Nanjing City	2021	China League One	31	8	0	0	-		-		31	8
Nanjing City	2022	China League One	25	4	2	0	-		-		27	4
Nanjing City	2023	China League One	25	5	0	0	-		-		25	5
Nanjing City	Total		81	17	2	0	0	0	0	0	83	17
Career total			182	32	20	1	5	0	1	0	208	33

== Honours ==
=== Club ===
Jiangsu Sainty

- Chinese FA Cup: 2015
