= Xu Xu (footballer) =

Chinese footballer

Personal information
- Date of birth: 13 January 1998 (age 28)
- Place of birth: Shehong, Suining, Sichuan, China
- Height: 1.70 m (5 ft 7 in)
- Positions: Midfielder; winger; forward

Youth career
- 2005–2013: Shandong Luneng
- 2013: Terrassa
- 2013–2016: Cornellà
- 2016: Espanyol
- 2016–2017: Sant Andreu
- 2017: Granada
- 2017: → Chongqing Liangjiang Athletic (youth loan)

Senior career*
Years	Team	Apps	(Gls)
2017–2021	Shaanxi Chang'an Athletic	25	(0)
Total		25	(0)

International career
2015	China U19		
- * Club domestic league appearances and goals

Xu Xu (Chinese: 胥栩; born 13 January 1998) is a Chinese footballer who plays as a midfielder, winger, or forward.

== Career ==
Born in Shehong, Suining, Sichuan, Xu started his career at the age of seven with Shandong Luneng, who he captained at youth level. In 2013, Xu trialed for the youth academy of Barcelona, Spain's most successful club, after receiving an offer to join the youth academy of Metz in France, where his father said, "I feel that these Barcelona U17 players are also playing average, and few are better than my kids". Having failed to get into Barcelona's academy, he instead joined Terrassa. This spell was short-lived, as he joined Cornellà at the age of fifteen.

In 2016, he became the first Chinese player to sign for Espanyol, but stayed for less than a year before joining Sant Andreu. In February 2017, he joined Granada, and was loaned to Chinese Super League side Chongqing Liangjiang Athletic, where he did not make an appearance.

He returned to Granada, but moved back to China to sign for Shaanxi Chang'an Athletic in the Chinese third division, helping them achieve promotion to the Chinese second division.

He retired in 2022, following his release by Shaanxi Chang'an Athletic.
