= Lai Jin =

Chinese footballer

Lai Jin 赖劲
Personal information
- Date of birth: 1 February 1991 (age 35)
- Place of birth: Xingning, Guangdong, China
- Height: 1.70 m (5 ft 7 in)
- Position: Midfielder

Senior career*
Years	Team	Apps	(Gls)
2011–2015	Shenzhen Ruby	42	(1)
2017	Shanghai Sunfun	7	(0)
- * Club domestic league appearances and goals as of 16 October 2017

Lai Jin (Chinese: 赖劲; born 1 February 1991 in Xingning) is a Chinese football player.

== Club career ==
In 2011, Lai Jin started his professional footballer career with Shenzhen Ruby in the Chinese Super League. He would eventually make his league debut for Shenzhen on 15 April 2011 in a game against Shanghai Shenhua, coming on as a substitute for Ermin Rakovič in the 46th minute.

== Career statistics ==
Statistics accurate as of match played 16 October 2017

Club performance			League		Cup		League Cup		Continental		Total	
Season	Club	League	Apps	Goals	Apps	Goals	Apps	Goals	Apps	Goals	Apps	Goals
China PR			League		FA Cup		CSL Cup		Asia		Total	
2011	Shenzhen Ruby	Chinese Super League	8	0	0	0	-		-		8	0
2012	Shenzhen Ruby	China League One	4	0	0	0	-		-		4	0
2013	Shenzhen Ruby	China League One	7	0	0	0	-		-		7	0
2014	Shenzhen Ruby	China League One	15	1	0	0	-		-		15	1
2015	Shenzhen Ruby	China League One	8	0	1	0	-		-		9	0
2017	Shanghai Sunfun	China League Two	7	0	0	0	-		-		7	0
Total	China PR		49	1	1	0	0	0	0	0	50	1
