= Hubei Istar F.C. =

Chinese football club

Hubei Istar 湖北青年星
- Full name: Hubei Istar Football Club 湖北青年星足球俱乐部
- Founded: 8 July 2016; 9 years ago
- Ground: Xinhua Road Sports Center, Wuhan, Hubei
- Capacity: 22,140
- Owner(s): Hubei Chufeng United Amateur Football Club Co., Ltd.
- Chairman: Yang Dongqiang
- Manager: Wan Houliang
- League: Chinese Champions League
- 2025: China League Two, 21st of 24 (relegated)
Home colours	Away colours

Hubei Istar Football Club (Chinese: 湖北青年星足球俱乐部; pinyin: Húběi Qīngniánxīng Zúqiú Jùlèbù; lit. 'Hubei Youth Stars F.C.') is a Chinese professional football club based in Wuhan, Hubei, that competes in the Chinese Champions League (CMCL), the fourth tier of Chinese football. Hubei Istar plays its home matches at the Xinhua Road Sports Center, located within Jianghan District.

== History ==
Wuhan Chufeng Heli F.C. was founded on 8 July 2016 combined by amateur club Wuhan New Era and unpunished players from Wuhan Hongxing after the Wuhan Hongxing–Jiangsu Suning brawl. They played in the 2016 China Amateur Football League and won the winners of 2016 Wuhan City Super League and the first place of northwest region final–group B successively. Wuhan Chufeng Heli finished third place in the national finals and won the qualification for promoting to 2017 China League Two, but then gave up to turn professional and remained at the amateur league. Two years later, they finally promoted to China League Two after finishing in third place again in 2018 Chinese Champions League, after changing their name to Hubei Chufeng United F.C. before the season.

In January 2021, Hubei Chufeng United changed their name to Hubei Istar F.C.

== Name history ==
- 2016–2018: Wuhan Chufeng Heli F.C. (武汉楚风合力)
- 2018–2020: Hubei Chufeng United F.C. (湖北楚风合力)
- 2021–present: Hubei Istar F.C. (湖北青年星)

== Players ==
=== First-team squad ===
As of 20 March 2024

Note: Flags indicate national team as defined under FIFA eligibility rules; some limited exceptions apply. Players may hold more than one non-FIFA nationality.

No.	Pos.	Nation	Player
41	DF	CHN	Yu Jingcheng
42	DF	CHN	Xia Jiayi
43	GK	CHN	Wang Xinghao
44	MF	CHN	Li Dongnan
45	FW	CHN	Huang Kaijun
46	DF	CHN	Yang Bowen
47	DF	CHN	Sun Kangbo
48	FW	CHN	Wang Zhicheng
49	MF	CHN	Wang Dingkun
50	FW	CHN	Wang Boyue
51	MF	CHN	Gao Su
52	FW	CHN	Huang Wenzheng
53	FW	CHN	Sun Wenchao
54	DF	CHN	Yu Tianle
55	MF	CHN	Xia Zihao
56	DF	CHN	Liu Xin

No.	Pos.	Nation	Player
57	FW	CHN	Wang Ziyang
58	DF	CHN	Wang Zheng
59	FW	CHN	Huang Bo
60	GK	CHN	Hu Guiying
61	DF	CHN	Zhong Mingzhi
62	FW	CHN	Lin Zihao
63	DF	CHN	Zhang Jun
64	DF	CHN	Wei Zixian
65	MF	CHN	Mewlan Memetimin
66	DF	CHN	Cui Shengcheng
67	FW	CHN	Min Xiankun
68	MF	CHN	Huang Jiale
69	MF	CHN	Lin Shangyuan
70	DF	CHN	Wei Suowei
71	GK	CHN	Meng Derui

== Coaching staff ==
Position	Staff
Head coach	(China) Wan Houliang
Assistant coach	(China) Xu Yining (China) Wang Dongliang
Goalkeeping coach	(China) Wu Yan

== Managerial history ==
- (China) Zhou Yi (2016)
- (China) Deng Sheng (2017)
- (China) Huang Zhengguo (2018)
- (Brazil) Luíz Felipe (2019–2020)
- (China) Zhou Rui (2021)
- (China) Gao Feng (2022–2025)
- (China) Wan Houliang (2026–present)

== Results ==
All-time league rankings

As of the end of 2019 season.

Year	Div	Pld	W	D	L	GF	GA	GD	Pts	Pos.	FA Cup	Super Cup	AFC	Att./G	Stadium
2016	4									3	DNQ	DNQ	DNQ		
2017	4									11	R1	DNQ	DNQ		Tazi Lake Sports Centre
2018	4									3	R4	DNQ	DNQ		Xinhua Road Sports Center
2019	3	30	8	10	12	27	39	−12	34^{1}	19	R1	DNQ	DNQ		Hankou Cultural Sports Centre

- ^1 In group stage.

Key

	China top division
	China second division
	China third division
	China fourth division
W	Winners
RU	Runners-up
3	Third place
	Relegated

- Pld = Played
- W = Games won
- D = Games drawn
- L = Games lost
- F = Goals for
- A = Goals against
- Pts = Points
- Pos = Final position
- DNQ = Did not qualify
- DNE = Did not enter
- NH = Not Held
- WD = Withdrawal
- – = Does Not Exist
- R1 = Round 1
- R2 = Round 2
- R3 = Round 3
- R4 = Round 4
- F = Final
- SF = Semi-finals
- QF = Quarter-finals
- R16 = Round of 16
- Group = Group stage
- GS2 = Second Group stage
- QR1 = First Qualifying Round
- QR2 = Second Qualifying Round
- QR3 = Third Qualifying Round
