= Xing Kai =

Chinese association football player

Personal information
- Date of birth: 8 January 1989 (age 37)
- Place of birth: Shenyang, Liaoning, China
- Height: 1.76 m (5 ft 9 in)
- Position: Defender

Senior career*
Years	Team	Apps	(Gls)
2009–2011	Shenzhen Ruby	2	(0)
2012	Shenzhen Main Sports		
2013	Xinjiang Tianshan Leopard		
2014–2016	Yinchuan Helanshan	7	(0)
2017	Shenyang Dongjin	9	(1)
- * Club domestic league appearances and goals

Xing Kai (simplified Chinese: 邢凯; traditional Chinese: 邢凱; pinyin: Xíng Kǎi; born 8 January 1989) is a former Chinese footballer.

== Career statistics ==
=== Club ===
Club	Season	League			Cup		Other		Total	
Club	Season	Division	Apps	Goals	Apps	Goals	Apps	Goals	Apps	Goals
Shenzhen Ruby	2009	Chinese Super League	2	0	0	0	0	0	2	0
Shenzhen Ruby	2010	Chinese Super League	0	0	0	0	0	0	0	0
Shenzhen Ruby	2011	Chinese Super League	0	0	0	0	0	0	0	0
Shenzhen Ruby	Total		2	0	0	0	0	0	2	0
Xinjiang Tianshan Leopard	2013	China League One	–		1 (Note: Appearances in the Chinese FA Cup)	0	0	0	1	0
Yinchuan Helanshan	2015	China League Two	4	0	0	0	0	0	4	0
Yinchuan Helanshan	2016	China League Two	3	0	0	0	0	0	3	0
Yinchuan Helanshan	Total		7	0	0	0	0	0	7	0
Shenyang Dongjin	2017	China League Two	9	1	0	0	4 (Note: Appearances in the China League Two playoffs)	0	13	1
Career total			18	1	1	0	4	0	23	1
