= Guangxi Liuzhou Liuyue F.C. =

Chinese football club

Guangxi Liuzhou Liuyue Football Club
- Founded: ?
- Dissolved: 2015
- Ground: Liuzhou Sports Center, Liuzhou, China
- Capacity: 35,000

Guangxi Liuzhou Liuyue (Chinese: 广西柳州柳粤) was an association football club based in Liuzhou, China. The club had competed in various local amateur competitions, as well as China Amateur Football League and Chinese FA Cup, before it was replaced by Liuzhou Ranko in 2015.

== History ==
Originally known as Liuzhou Tax Bureau F.C., it first reached Liuzhou League One in 1995. In 1999 it was renamed as Guangxi Liuzhou Liuyue F.C., and won the title of Guangxi Super League consecutively in 2012 and 2013.

In 2014, the club won the Liuzhou Super League championship and came as runners-up of Guangxi Super League. They also qualified for the first round of the 2014 Chinese FA Cup, where they lost 3–0 to Dalian Transcendence.

In 2015, the club won both of the Liuzhou and Guangxi league titles, but right after the season, it was brought and annexed by Liuzhou Ranko, another local club, to participate in the 2015 China Amateur Football League, thus ending its history which spans more than two decades.

== Name history ==
- ?—1999 Liuzhou Tax Bureau F.C. 柳州税务局
- 1999—2015 Guangxi Liuzhou Liuyue F.C. 广西柳州柳粤
