= Wang Peng (footballer, born 1991) =

Chinese association football player

Personal information
- Date of birth: 12 May 1991 (age 35)
- Place of birth: Dalian, Liaoning, China
- Height: 1.86 m (6 ft 1 in)
- Position: Defender

Team information
- Current team: Tai'an Tiankuang

Senior career*
Years	Team	Apps	(Gls)
2011–2013	Chengdu Tiancheng	0	(0)
2014	Shandong Tengding		
2015	Anhui Litian	7	(1)
2016–2017	Heilongjiang Lava Spring	18	(0)
2017–2019	Dalian Chanjoy	24	(3)
2019–2020	Lhasa UCI	15	(0)
2020–2021	Hebei Zhuoao	4	(0)
2021	Beijing BSU	12	(1)
2022-	Tai'an Tiankuang	0	(0)
- * Club domestic league appearances and goals as of 14:01, 5 May 2022 (UTC)

Wang Peng (Chinese: 王鹏; born 12 May 1991) is a Chinese footballer currently playing as a defender for Tai'an Tiankuang in China League Two.

== Career statistics ==
=== Club ===
As of 24 August 2021.

Club	Season	League			Cup		Other		Total	
Club	Season	Division	Apps	Goals	Apps	Goals	Apps	Goals	Apps	Goals
Chengdu Tiancheng	2011	Chinese Super League	0	0	0	0	0	0	0	0
Chengdu Tiancheng	2012	Chinese Super League	0	0	0	0	0	0	0	0
Chengdu Tiancheng	2013	Chinese Super League	0	0	0	0	0	0	0	0
Chengdu Tiancheng	Total		0	0	0	0	0	0	0	0
Anhui Litian	2015	China League Two	7	1	2 (Note: Appearances in the Chinese FA Cup)	0	0	0	9	1
Heilongjiang Lava Spring	2016	China League Two	16	0	0	0	2 (Note: Appearances in the China League Two playoffs)	0	18	0
Heilongjiang Lava Spring	2017	China League Two	0	0	1	0	0	0	1	0
Heilongjiang Lava Spring	Total		16	0	1	0	2	0	19	0
Dalian Chanjoy	2017	China League Two	11	0	0	0	0	0	11	0
Dalian Chanjoy	2018	China League Two	6	0	3	0	0	0	9	0
Dalian Chanjoy	2019	China League Two	7	3	1	0	0	0	8	3
Dalian Chanjoy	Total		24	3	4	0	0	0	28	3
Lhasa UCI	2019	China League Two	14	0	0	0	1	0	15	0
Hebei Zhuoao	2020	China League Two	3	0	0	0	0	0	3	0
Hebei Zhuoao	2021	China League Two	1	0	0	0	0	0	1	0
Hebei Zhuoao	Total		4	0	0	0	0	0	4	0
Beijing BSU	2021	China League One	3	1	0	0	0	0	3	1
Career total			68	5	7	0	3	0	78	5
