= Wuhan Hongxing Bairun F.C. =

Chinese football club

Wuhan Hongxing Bairun
- Founded: 1982; 44 years ago
- Dissolved: 20 May 2016; 10 years ago
- Ground: Hankou Cultural Sports Centre, Wuhan, China
- Capacity: 17,000

Wuhan Hongxing Bairun Football Club (Chinese: 武汉市宏兴柏润足球俱乐部) was an amateur association football club in the city of Wuhan, China. They were among the most successful amateur football clubs in the country. In 2014, they reached the final rounds of the East Region amateur championship. They also won their local league championship that year and the Chinese amateur division.

On 11 May 2016, Wuhan Hongxing were involved in an on-field brawl in the third round of 2016 Chinese FA Cup against first tier club Jiangsu Suning. The players and staff of Wuhan Hongxing attacked and injured the players of Jiangsu after the match, and Wuhan Hongxing was found out to use ineligible players to play in the match. On 20 May 2016, the Chinese Football Association published the punishments. Wuhan Hongxing was fined 200,000 RMB and banned from all future matches organised by the Chinese Football Association.

The unpunished players of Wuhan Hongxing joined Wuhan Chufeng Heli F.C. which was founded in July 2016.
