= List of Chinese football transfers winter 2016 =

This is a list of Chinese football transfers for the 2016 season winter transfer window. Super League and League One transfer window opened on 1 January 2016 and closed on 26 February 2016. League Two transfer window opens on 1 March 2016 and closes on 15 March 2016.

== Super League ==
=== Beijing Guoan ===
In:

No.	Pos.	Nation	Player
2	DF	UZB	Egor Krimets (loan from (Uzbekistan) Pakhtakor Tashkent)
5	MF	BRA	Ralf (from (Brazil) Corinthians)
6	MF	CHN	Zhang Xiaobin (loan return from Chongqing Lifan)
17	FW	TUR	Burak Yılmaz (from (Turkey) Galatasaray)
21	MF	BRA	Renato Augusto (from (Brazil) Corinthians)
23	DF	CHN	Yang Yun (loan return from Liaoning Whowin)
28	DF	CHN	Zhang Chengdong (loan return from (Spain) Rayo Vallecano)

Out:

No.	Pos.	Nation	Player
2	DF	CHN	Li Yunqiu (to Shanghai Shenhua)
5	MF	CRO	Darko Matić (to Changchun Yatai)
9	FW	CHN	Tan Tiancheng (to Yinchuan Helanshan)
10	FW	MNE	Dejan Damjanović (to (South Korea) FC Seoul)
15	GK	CHN	Shi Xiaotian (loan return to Liaoning Whowin)
16	MF	KOR	Ha Dae-Sung (to (Japan) F.C. Tokyo)
17	MF	ARG	Pablo Batalla (to (Turkey) Bursaspor)
21	FW	KOS	Erton Fejzullahu (to Dalian Transcendence)
23	MF	CHN	Chen Zhizhao (to Guangzhou R&F)
26	MF	CHN	Wang Hao (Released)
29	MF	CHN	Shao Jiayi (Retired)
34	MF	CHN	Ba Dun (loan to Meizhou Kejia)
36	MF	CHN	Tong Le (Released)
38	MF	CHN	Du Shuaishuai (Released)
39	DF	CHN	Li Bowen (loan to Meizhou Kejia)
40	MF	CHN	Cao Hanchen (Released)
41	FW	CHN	Qin Beichen (to Shenyang Urban)
42	MF	CHN	Fan Yang (to Zhejiang Yiteng)
43	FW	CHN	Zhu Chaoqing (loan to Sichuan Longfor)
45	DF	CHN	Wang Junming (Released)
46	FW	CHN	He Lilong (Released)
47	DF	CHN	Zhang Yu (Released)
48	FW	CHN	Gong Zheng (to Beijing BG)
53	MF	CHN	Hu Zhuqi (Released)
54	DF	CHN	Zhang Shuai (to Shenzhen Renren)

=== Changchun Yatai ===
In:

No.	Pos.	Nation	Player
2	DF	HKG	Jack Sealy (from (Hong Kong) South China)
4	MF	CRO	Darko Matić (from Beijing Guoan)
6	MF	FRA	Julien Gorius (from (Belgium) K.R.C. Genk)
9	FW	SRB	Ognjen Ožegović (from (Serbia) FK Vojvodina)
11	MF	CHN	Yang He (loan return from Meizhou Kejia)
12	DF	TPE	Yaki Yen (Free Agent)
17	DF	CHN	Fan Xiaodong (from Hangzhou Greentown)
-	FW	CHN	Liu Weidong (loan return from Chongqing Lifan)
-	MF	CHN	Liu Zefeng (loan return to Anhui Litian)
-	DF	CHN	Li Xiaoting (loan return from Harbin Yiteng)

Out:

No.	Pos.	Nation	Player
10	MF	HUN	Szabolcs Huszti (to (Germany) Eintracht Frankfurt)
12	MF	CHN	Zhu Yifan (loan to Jiangxi Liansheng)
17	MF	CHN	Ma Xiaolei (Released)
25	MF	HUN	Ákos Elek (to (Hungary) Diósgyőri VTK)
26	MF	CHN	Chen Liansheng (Released)
31	FW	NIG	Moussa Maazou (to (Denmark) Randers FC)
40	GK	CHN	Lu Renkai (Released)
-	FW	CHN	Liu Weidong (to Chongqing Lifan)
-	MF	CHN	Liu Zefeng (to Heilongjiang Lava Spring)
-	DF	CHN	Li Xiaoting (loan to Shenzhen Renren)
-	FW	CHN	Liu Xiaodong (loan to Baoding Yingli Yitong)
-	GK	CHN	Mi Tianhe (loan to Baoding Yingli Yitong)

=== Chongqing Lifan ===
In:

No.	Pos.	Nation	Player
1	GK	CHN	Deng Xiaofei (from Jiangsu Suning)
2	MF	CHN	Li Fang (Free Agent)
8	MF	CHN	Ding Jie (from Liaoning Whowin)
14	DF	KOR	Jung Woo-young (from (Japan) Vissel Kobe)
15	DF	CRO	Goran Milović (from (Croatia) Hajduk Split)
18	MF	CHN	Xu Yang (from Henan Jianye)
20	FW	CHN	Liu Weidong (from Changchun Yatai)
23	GK	CHN	Wang Min (from Jiangxi Liansheng)
25	MF	CHN	Peng Xinli (loan from Guangzhou Evergrande Taobao)
32	FW	BRA	Fernandinho (from (Portugal) G.D. Estoril Praia)
50	FW	CHN	Fang Zhengyang (from Hunan Billows)
-	DF	CHN	Shi Zhe (loan return from Qingdao Hainiu)

Out:

No.	Pos.	Nation	Player
2	DF	CHN	Lü Haidong (to Shenzhen FC)
8	FW	CHN	Liu Weidong (loan return to Changchun Yatai)
9	FW	BRA	Guto (to Wuhan Zall)
13	MF	CHN	Zhang Xiaobin (loan return to Beijing Guoan)
14	DF	MAR	Issam El Adoua (to (United Arab Emirates) Al Dhafra FC)
15	DF	CHN	Sun Jihai (to Guizhou Renhe)
20	MF	CHN	Peng Rui (loan to Chengdu Qianbao)
23	GK	CHN	Zhang Lei (to Hangzhou Greentown)
27	MF	CHN	Cheng Mouyi (to Hangzhou Greentown)
29	MF	CHN	Wu Peng (Released)
32	FW	BRA	Fernandinho (loan return to (Portugal) G.D. Estoril Praia)
35	DF	AUS	Adrian Leijer (to (South Korea) Suwon FC)
36	DF	CHN	Xu Jiale (Released)
37	DF	CHN	Liu Juncheng (Released)
40	DF	CHN	Zhang Xiaolong (Released)
42	MF	CHN	Hong Youpeng (to Dalian Transcendence)
43	DF	CHN	Dong Song (Released)
46	MF	CHN	Luo Xiaodong (Released)
47	DF	CHN	Cui Binhui (Released)
50	FW	CHN	Wang Zhe (Released)
51	DF	CHN	Dai Yuhan (Released)
-	DF	CHN	Shi Zhe (to Qingdao Hainiu)

=== Guangzhou Evergrande Taobao ===
In:

No.	Pos.	Nation	Player
4	MF	CHN	Xu Xin (from (Spain) Atlético Madrid B)
9	FW	COL	Jackson Martínez (from (Spain) Atlético Madrid)
18	MF	CHN	Li Yuanyi (from (Portugal) Boavista)
23	DF	CHN	Han Pengfei (from (Portugal) Mafra)
32	GK	CHN	Liu Dianzuo (from Guangzhou R&F)
55	DF	CHN	Hu Bowen (loan return from Qingdao Hainiu)
-	DF	CHN	Yi Teng (loan return from Hangzhou Greentown)
-	DF	CHN	Zhang Hongnan (loan return from Shenzhen FC)
-	MF	CHN	Feng Renliang (loan return from Guizhou Renhe)
-	FW	CHN	Yang Chaosheng (loan return from Liaoning Whowin)
-	MF	ITA	Alessandro Diamanti (loan return from (England) Watford)

Out:

No.	Pos.	Nation	Player
1	GK	CHN	Dong Chunyu (Released)
8	MF	BRA	Renê Júnior (to (Brazil) Ponte Preta)
9	FW	BRA	Elkeson (to Shanghai SIPG)
14	GK	CHN	Liu Weiguo (loan to Liaoning Whowin)
15	DF	CHN	Yi Teng (loan to Beijing Renhe)
18	FW	CHN	Dong Xuesheng (to Hebei China Fortune)
21	MF	CHN	Zhao Xuri (to Tianjin Quanjian)
22	GK	CHN	Li Shuai (to Shanghai Greenland Shenhua)
34	MF	CHN	Wang Junhui (loan to Shijiazhuang Ever Bright)
39	DF	CHN	Zhu Junhui (Released)
41	DF	CHN	Gong Liangxuan (loan to Sichuan Longfor)
49	MF	CHN	Wang Rui (loan to Wuhan Zall)
51	MF	CHN	Xu Li'ao (Released)
53	MF	CHN	Guo Tao (Released)
55	MF	CHN	Lin Zhikeng (Released)
56	FW	BRA	Robinho (to (Brazil) Atlético Mineiro)
-	DF	CHN	Zhang Hongnan (to Shenzhen FC)
-	MF	CHN	Feng Renliang (to Guizhou Renhe)
-	FW	CHN	Yang Chaosheng (loan to Wuhan Zall)
-	MF	ITA	Alessandro Diamanti (loan to (Italy) Atalanta)
-	FW	CHN	Shewket Yalqun (loan to Xinjiang Tianshan Leopard)
-	MF	CHN	Peng Xinli (loan to Chongqing Lifan)

=== Guangzhou R&F ===
In:

No.	Pos.	Nation	Player
6	DF	CHN	Yang Ting (from (Belgium) Tubize)
7	MF	SWE	Gustav Svensson (from (Sweden) IFK Göteborg)
9	FW	AUS	Apostolos Giannou (from (Greece) Asteras Tripolis)
10	FW	BRA	Bruninho (from (Denmark) FC Nordsjælland)
27	MF	CHN	Hou Junjie (from Shanghai Shenxin)
29	FW	CHN	Xiao Zhi (from Henan Jianye)
32	MF	CHN	Chen Zhizhao (from Beijing Guoan)
51	MF	CHN	Zhu Di (from Henan Jianye)
55	DF	CHN	Tu Dongxu (from Meizhou Kejia)
-	FW	CHN	Zhang Shuo (loan return from Tianjin Songjiang)
-	MF	CHN	Pan Jiajun (loan return from Meixian Hakka)

Out:

No.	Pos.	Nation	Player
4	DF	CHN	Jin Yangyang (to Hebei China Fortune)
7	FW	CHN	Jiang Ning (to Hebei China Fortune)
10	MF	ESP	Michel Herrero (loan to (Spain) Real Oviedo)
14	DF	CHN	Li Jianhua (Released)
16	MF	CHN	Feng Zhuoyi (to Henan Jianye)
18	FW	CHN	Zhang Yuan (loan to Beijing Renhe)
22	FW	COD	Jeremy Bokila (loan to (Turkey) Eskişehirspor)
24	FW	CHN	Men Yang (to Lijiang Jiayunhao)
25	FW	NGR	Aaron Samuel Olanare (loan to (Russia) CSKA Moscow)
27	GK	CHN	Liu Dianzuo (to Guangzhou Evergrande)
29	FW	CHN	Zhang Shuo (to Tianjin Songjiang)
33	MF	CHN	Li Yan (to Baoding Yingli Yitong)
36	DF	CHN	Wang Xinhui (Released)
37	DF	CHN	Li Zhe (Retired)
41	GK	CHN	Zhao Bo (Released)
44	MF	CHN	Chen Siyu (Released)
45	GK	CHN	Chen Jiahao (to Hainan Seamen)
47	MF	CHN	Tang Xin (to Guizhou Zhicheng)
48	FW	CHN	Wen Chao (to Baoding Yingli Yitong)
49	MF	CHN	Wang Xuankai (Released)
50	DF	CHN	Luo Hao (to Nei Mongol Zhongyou)
51	MF	CHN	Gao Jiarun (to Tianjin Teda)
53	MF	CHN	Chen Tang (to Hebei China Fortune)
54	MF	CHN	Pan Jiajun (to Henan Jianye)
55	MF	CHN	Ma Jun (Released)

=== Hangzhou Greentown ===
In:

No.	Pos.	Nation	Player
1	GK	CHN	Zhang Lei (from Chongqing Lifan)
2	MF	CHN	Yue Xin (loan return from Wuhan Zall)
4	MF	CHN	Sun Zheng'ao (loan return from Shenzhen F.C.)
6	DF	CHN	Chen Xiao (from Yanbian Fude)
7	FW	BRA	Denílson Gabionetta (from (Italy) Salernitana)
17	FW	AUS	Tim Cahill (from Shanghai Shenhua)
26	FW	CHN	Tan Yang (from (Portugal) Mafra)
27	DF	CHN	Wang Yang (loan return from Baotou Nanjiao)
28	MF	CHN	Cheng Mouyi (from Chongqing Lifan)
29	GK	CHN	Liu Yang (from Liaoning Whowin)
32	DF	KOR	Oh Beom-seok (from (South Korea) Suwon Samsung Bluewings)
56	MF	CHN	Liu Heng (loan return from Baotou Nanjiao)
57	MF	CHN	Shen Jin (loan return from Anhui Litian)
58	GK	CHN	Fan Jinming (loan return from Lijiang Jiayunhao)
60	FW	CHN	Wang Chaolong (loan return from Lijiang Jiayunhao)
-	FW	TUN	Imed Louati (loan return from (South Korea) Gyeongnam FC)
-	MF	CHN	Wei Zhaokun (loan return from Anhui Litian)
-	GK	CHN	Yu Yongzhe (loan return from Jiangxi Liansheng)
-	MF	GAM	Bubacarr Trawally (loan return from Yanbian Changbaishan)

Out:

No.	Pos.	Nation	Player
1	GK	CHN	Gu Chao (to Jiangsu Suning)
2	DF	CHN	Wang Xiao (to Baotou Nanjiao)
5	DF	CHN	Yi Teng (loan return to Guangzhou Evergrande Taobao)
7	FW	TUN	Imed Louati (loan return to (Sweden) Dalkurd FF)
11	MF	CHN	Xie Pengfei (to Jiangsu Suning)
13	DF	CHN	Cao Xuan (to Dalian Yifang)
15	MF	CHN	Cheng Jin (loan to Wuhan Zall)
16	DF	CHN	Fan Xiaodong (to Changchun Yatai)
20	MF	LBN	Roda Antar (to (Lebanon) Tadamon Sour)
22	DF	CHN	Wang Lin (to Shanghai Shenhua)
24	MF	CHN	Zhao Xiaotian (to Hebei China Fortune)
26	DF	TUN	Bassem Boulaabi (Released)
27	GK	CHN	Huang Yuandong (Released)
31	MF	SRB	Miloš Bosančić (to (Thailand) BEC Tero Sasana)
35	MF	CHN	Wang Jiayu (loan return to Shanghai SIPG)
39	MF	CHN	Wei Zhaokun (loan to Wuhan Zall)
40	DF	CHN	Shi Tangxian (Released)
41	MF	CHN	Han Lieguang (Released)
42	GK	CHN	Liu Chang (to Shenyang Urban)
53	MF	CHN	Wang Hongyou (to Dalian Transcendence)
54	DF	CHN	Niu Xiucheng (to Jingtie Locomotive)
57	DF	CHN	Liang Qingjie (Released)
58	MF	CHN	Zuo Wei (Released)
-	GK	CHN	Yu Yongzhe (Released)
-	MF	GAM	Bubacarr Trawally (to Yanbian Funde)

=== Hebei China Fortune ===
In:

No.	Pos.	Nation	Player
4	DF	CHN	Jin Yangyang (from Guangzhou R&F)
6	MF	CHN	Luo Senwen (from Shandong Luneng Taishan)
7	FW	CHN	Jiang Ning (from Guangzhou R&F)
9	FW	CHN	Dong Xuesheng (from Guangzhou Evergrande)
10	FW	ARG	Ezequiel Lavezzi (from (France) Paris Saint-Germain)
11	MF	CHN	Gui Hong (Free Agent)
21	MF	FRA	Gaël Kakuta (from (Spain) Sevilla FC)
22	DF	TUR	Ersan Gülüm (from (Turkey) Beşiktaş J.K.)
25	MF	CMR	Stéphane Mbia (from (Turkey) Trabzonspor)
27	FW	CIV	Gervinho (from (Italy) A.S. Roma)
30	MF	CHN	Li Hang (from Wuhan Zall)
32	MF	CHN	Ding Haifeng (from Liaoning Whowin)
33	DF	CHN	Gao Zhunyi (loan from Shandong Luneng)
35	GK	CHN	Zhou Yuchen (loan from Shandong Luneng)
46	DF	CHN	Wu Qingtao (Free Agent)
48	MF	CHN	Zhao Xiaotian (from Hangzhou Greentown)
50	MF	CHN	Chen Tang (from Guangzhou R&F)
51	FW	CHN	Piao Lei (from Shanghai Shenhua)
60	MF	CHN	Sang Yifei (from Tianjin Teda)

Out:

No.	Pos.	Nation	Player
6	MF	CHN	Luo Senwen (loan return to Shandong Luneng Taishan)
7	FW	BRA	Edu (Released)
9	FW	NOR	Abdurahim Laajab (to (Japan) Yokohama F.C.)
10	MF	SRB	Nenad Milijaš (to Nei Mongol Zhongyou)
26	FW	CHN	Tan Yang (loan return to (Portugal) Mafra)
32	MF	SRB	Miroslav Radović (to (Slovenia) Olimpija)
33	DF	CHN	Hao Shuang (to Hunan Billows)
41	FW	CHN	Kong Xiangyu (Released)
43	MF	CHN	Shi Hanchen (Released)
45	DF	CHN	Wei Jiye (Released)
47	FW	CHN	Zhong Jiajie (Released)
50	MF	CHN	Wang Xiaolong (Released)

=== Henan Jianye ===
In:

No.	Pos.	Nation	Player
3	DF	CHN	Li Xiaoming (loan from Shanghai Shenhua)
6	MF	CHN	Feng Zhuoyi (from Guangzhou R&F)
11	MF	CHN	Mou Shantao (from Shenzhen F.C.)
12	GK	CHN	Wang Guoming (from Shijiazhuang Ever Bright)
15	DF	AUS	Ryan McGowan (from (Scotland) Dundee United)
20	FW	SWE	Osman Sow (from (Scotland) Heart of Midlothian)
21	MF	CHN	Pan Jiajun (from Guangzhou R&F)
25	FW	CHN	Chen Hao (from Shandong Luneng Taishan)
59	MF	CHN	Zhang Li (loan return from Wuhan Zall)
-	FW	BRA	Marques (loan return from (Brazil) Palmeiras)

Out:

No.	Pos.	Nation	Player
3	DF	CHN	Lü Jianjun (to Shijiazhuang Ever Bright)
6	FW	CHN	Li Zhichao (to Jiangsu Suning)
7	FW	CHN	Xiao Zhi (to Guangzhou R&F)
11	FW	CHN	Lei Yongchi (to Liaoning Whowin)
12	DF	CHN	Lu Qiang (to Liaoning Whowin)
15	DF	KOR	Jung In-whan (to (South Korea) FC Seoul)
17	GK	CHN	Guo Chunquan (to Baotou Nanjiao)
18	MF	CHN	Xu Yang (to Chongqing Lifan)
20	FW	POL	Mateusz Zachara (Released)
21	MF	CHN	Zhu Di (to Guangzhou R&F)
25	MF	CHN	Song Yi (to Beijing BG)
31	GK	CHN	Luo Zuqing (to Meizhou Kejia)
33	FW	CHN	Bi Jinhao (to Shanghai Shenhua)
36	DF	CHN	Sun Yabing (Released)
43	DF	CHN	Geng Tianming (to Nei Mongol Zhongyou)
45	MF	CHN	Huang Zhengyan (Released)
46	FW	CHN	Zhang Jingzhe (to Suzhou Dongwu)
48	MF	CHN	Ge Shihao (Released)
49	GK	CHN	Huang Haonan (Released)
53	MF	CHN	Wang Guangshuai (Released)
-	FW	BRA	Marques (to (Brazil) Palmeiras)

=== Jiangsu Suning ===
In:

No.	Pos.	Nation	Player
1	GK	CHN	Gu Chao (from Hangzhou Greentown)
6	DF	AUS	Trent Sainsbury (from (Netherlands) PEC Zwolle)
7	MF	BRA	Ramires (from (England) Chelsea F.C.)
9	FW	BRA	Jô (from (United Arab Emirates) Al Shabab)
10	MF	BRA	Alex Teixeira (from (Ukraine) Shakhtar Donetsk)
11	MF	CHN	Xie Pengfei (from Hangzhou Greentown)
21	MF	CHN	Li Zhichao (from Henan Jianye)
29	MF	CHN	Yang Jiawei (from Shanghai Shenxin)
-	DF	CHN	Miao Ming (loan return from Baoding Yingli Yitong)
-	FW	COL	Edinson Toloza (loan return from (Colombia) Junior)

Out:

No.	Pos.	Nation	Player
1	GK	CHN	Deng Xiaofei (to Chongqing Lifan)
3	DF	BRA	Eleílson (Released)
6	DF	ISL	Sölvi Ottesen (to Wuhan Zall)
9	MF	CHN	Lu Bofei (Retired)
10	FW	ISL	Viðar Örn Kjartansson (to (Sweden) Malmö FF)
11	FW	JPN	Sergio Escudero (to (Japan) Kyoto Sanga)
20	MF	CHN	Sun Ke (to Tianjin Quanjian)
31	DF	ROU	Marius Constantin (loan return to (Romania) ASA Târgu Mureș)
32	FW	CHN	Bari Mamatil (to Qingdao Huanghai)
34	DF	CHN	Li Haoran (Released)
36	GK	CHN	Wen Zhixiang (to Jiangxi Liansheng)
-	DF	CHN	Miao Ming (to Baoding Yingli Yitong)
-	FW	COL	Edinson Toloza (to (Colombia) Junior)

=== Liaoning F.C. ===
In:

No.	Pos.	Nation	Player
1	GK	CHN	Liu Weiguo (loan from Guangzhou Evergrande)
10	MF	AUS	James Troisi (from (Italy) Juventus FC)
21	DF	COD	Assani Lukimya (from (Germany) Werder Bremen)
24	GK	CHN	Zhang Zhenqiang (from Dalian Yifang)
25	DF	CHN	Lu Qiang (from Henan Jianye)
28	GK	CHN	Shi Xiaotian (loan return from Beijing Guoan)
30	FW	SEN	Ibrahima Toure (from (United Arab Emirates) Al-Nasr)
31	DF	CHN	Liu Shangkun (from Wuhan Zall)
32	FW	CHN	Lei Yongchi (from Henan Jianye)
33	DF	AUS	Michael Thwaite (from (Australia) Perth Glory)
43	MF	CHN	Li Chenglin (from Yanbian Fude)
54	DF	CHN	Jiang Dongnan (Free Agent)

Out:

No.	Pos.	Nation	Player
1	GK	CHN	Zhang Lu (to Tianjin Quanjian)
10	FW	CIV	Franck Boli (loan to (Norway) Aalesunds FK)
13	MF	ROU	Eric Bicfalvi (to (Romania) FC Dinamo București)
14	FW	BRA	Paulo Henrique (loan return to Shanghai Greenland Shenhua)
16	FW	CHN	Yang Chaosheng (loan return to Guangzhou Evergrande Taobao)
21	DF	CHN	Yang Yun (loan return to Beijing Guoan)
24	GK	CHN	Huang Hongbo (Released)
26	MF	CHN	Qin Sheng (to Shanghai Shenhua)
27	DF	CHN	Wang Bo (to Nei Mongol Zhongyou)
29	GK	CHN	Liu Yang (to Hangzhou Greentown)
30	DF	KOR	Kim Yoo-jin (Released)
32	MF	CHN	Ding Haifeng (to Hebei China Fortune)
34	FW	NGR	Derick Ogbu (to (Japan) Ventforet Kofu)
35	MF	CHN	Ding Jie (to Chongqing Lifan)
37	MF	CHN	Zheng Zhihao (to Yinchuan Helanshan)
41	MF	CHN	Wu Junkui (Released)
43	MF	CHN	Zhang Qixian (Released)
45	DF	CHN	Hu Xin (Released)
48	DF	CHN	Xu Wanquan (to Chengdu Qianbao)
49	MF	CHN	Zhao Hongxu (Released)
50	MF	CHN	Zhao Cangjian (Released)
51	MF	CHN	Wang Zhihui (Released)
52	MF	CHN	Yu Zhen (to Shenzhen Renren)

=== Shandong Luneng Taishan ===
In:

No.	Pos.	Nation	Player
5	DF	BRA	Gil (from (Brazil) Corinthians)
12	GK	CHN	Liu Zhenli (from Qingdao Jonoon)
27	FW	CHN	Huang Pu (from (Portugal) AD Oliveirense)
30	MF	CHN	Chen Zhechao (loan return from (Portugal) S.C.U. Torreense)
-	FW	CHN	Chen Hao (loan return from Shanghai Shenxin)
-	DF	CHN	Mi Haolun (loan return from Shijiazhuang Ever Bright)
-	MF	CHN	Luo Senwen (loan return from Hebei CFFC)

Out:

No.	Pos.	Nation	Player
5	MF	BRA	Júnior Urso (loan to (Brazil) Atlético Mineiro)
6	DF	CHN	Gao Zhunyi (loan to Hebei China Fortune)
16	DF	CHN	Wang Qiang (to Guizhou Renhe)
18	FW	CHN	Han Peng (to Guizhou Renhe)
18	FW	CHN	Chen Hao (to Henan Jianye)
28	GK	CHN	Zhou Yuchen (loan to Hebei China Fortune)
30	GK	CHN	Shao Puliang (to Shijiazhuang Ever Bright)
36	MF	CHN	Cui Peng (to Shijiazhuang Ever Bright)
39	DF	CHN	Wang Youle (Released)
45	MF	CHN	Zhou Shengzhi (Released)
46	FW	CHN	Wang Qirui (Released)
-	DF	CHN	Mi Haolun (to Shijiazhuang Ever Bright)
-	MF	CHN	Luo Senwen (to Hebei China Fortune)

=== Shanghai Greenland Shenhua ===
In:

No.	Pos.	Nation	Player
4	DF	KOR	Kim Kee-Hee (from (South Korea) Jeonbuk Hyundai Motors)
13	MF	COL	Fredy Guarín (from (Italy) Inter Milan)
16	DF	CHN	Li Yunqiu (from Beijing Guoan)
17	FW	NGR	Obafemi Martins (from (United States) Seattle Sounders FC)
25	DF	CHN	Wang Lin (from Hangzhou Greentown)
26	MF	CHN	Qin Sheng (from Liaoning Whowin)
27	GK	CHN	Li Shuai (from Guangzhou Evergrande Taobao)
33	FW	CHN	Bi Jinhao (from Henan Jianye)
41	MF	CHN	Cong Zhen (from Dalian Transcendence)
57	MF	CHN	Wang Fei (loan return from Nei Mongol Zhongyou)
-	FW	BRA	Paulo Henrique (loan return from Liaoning Whowin)
-	DF	CHN	Leng Shiao (loan return from (Spain) Atlético Museros)
-	MF	CHN	Pan Weihao (loan return from (Spain) Atlético Museros)
-	DF	CHN	Huang Bowen (loan return from (Spain) Atlético Museros)
-	FW	ARG	Lucas Viatri (loan return from (Argentina) Banfield)

Out:

No.	Pos.	Nation	Player
4	DF	GRE	Avraam Papadopoulos (to (Japan) Júbilo Iwata )
12	FW	BRA	Paulo Henrique (Released)
14	MF	MLI	Mohamed Sissoko (Released)
17	FW	AUS	Tim Cahill (to Hangzhou Greentown)
21	MF	CHN	Jiang Kun (to Qingdao Huanghai)
29	MF	CHN	Fan Lingjiang (to Qingdao Huanghai)
37	MF	CHN	Han Yi (Released)
39	DF	CHN	Zhang Zongzheng (to Qingdao Huanghai)
40	FW	CHN	Xu Qi (Released)
41	DF	CHN	Liang Wei (Released)
42	MF	CHN	Zhang Jiawei (Released)
43	MF	CHN	Xie Fuquan (Released)
44	MF	CHN	Bo Xiaobo (Released)
47	MF	CHN	Liao Zhilüe (loan to (Spain) CF Cracks)
49	MF	CHN	Zhang Zhongyuan (Released)
50	GK	CHN	Dong Guangxiang (Released)
53	MF	CHN	Yang Chen (to Shanghai JuJu Sports)
54	DF	HKG	Brian Fok (loan to (Romania) ACS Berceni)
55	DF	CHN	Li Xiaoming (loan to Henan Jianye)
56	DF	CHN	Xu Yougang (loan to Qingdao Huanghai)
59	MF	CHN	Huang Jie (Released)
60	MF	CHN	Chen Junjie (Released)
61	FW	CHN	Piao Lei (to Hebei China Fortune)
-	DF	CHN	Leng Shiao (loan to Qingdao Huanghai)
-	MF	CHN	Pan Weihao (loan to Qingdao Huanghai)
-	DF	CHN	Huang Bowen (loan to Wuhan Zall)
-	FW	ARG	Lucas Viatri (to (Argentina) Estudiantes LP)
-	MF	CHN	Cui Qi (loan to (Spain) Atlético Museros)
-	MF	CHN	Yang Haofeng (loan to (Spain) Atlético Museros)

=== Shanghai SIPG ===
In:

No.	Pos.	Nation	Player
9	FW	BRA	Elkeson (from Guangzhou Evergrande Taobao)
20	MF	CHN	Wang Jiayu (loan return from Hangzhou Greentown)
-	MF	CHN	Zheng Dalun (loan return from Tianjin Songjiang)

Out:

No.	Pos.	Nation	Player
8	MF	BRA	Davi (Released)
9	FW	SWE	Tobias Hysén (to (Sweden) IFK Göteborg)
13	MF	CHN	Zheng Dalun (to Tianjin Quanjian)
16	DF	CHN	Wu Haitian (loan to Shanghai JuJu Sports)
31	GK	CHN	Dong Jialin (to Yanbian Funde)
36	FW	CHN	Li Jiawei (loan to Nantong Zhiyun)
39	DF	CHN	Wu Yuyin (to Dalian Yifang)
41	FW	CHN	Chen Binbin (Released)
52	DF	CHN	Wu Qinjun (Released)
54	MF	CHN	Liu Xiangcheng (loan to Shanghai JuJu Sports)

=== Shijiazhuang Ever Bright ===
In:

No.	Pos.	Nation	Player
8	MF	CHN	Cui Peng (from Shandong Luneng Taishan)
12	GK	CHN	Shao Puliang (from Shandong Luneng Taishan)
20	DF	CHN	Li Kai (from Qingdao Hainiu)
24	DF	CHN	Lü Jianjun (from Henan Jianye)
25	DF	CHN	Mi Haolun (from Shandong Luneng Taishan)
27	MF	CHN	Wang Junhui (loan from Guangzhou Evergrande)
29	MF	CHN	Guo Song (loan return from (Portugal) GD União Torcatense)
30	FW	BRA	Diego Maurício (loan from (Brazil) Bragantino)
52	FW	CHN	Su Jingyu (Free Agent)
53	MF	CHN	Chen Mingchao (Free Agent)

Out:

No.	Pos.	Nation	Player
5	MF	HKG	Bai He (to (Hong Kong) Eastern)
8	MF	BUL	Georgi Iliev (to (Bulgaria) Cherno More)
12	GK	CHN	Wang Guoming (to Henan Jianye)
16	DF	BRA	Rodrigo Defendi (to (Slovenia) NK Maribor)
24	FW	ISL	Eiður Guðjohnsen (to (Norway) Molde FK)
25	DF	CHN	Mi Haolun (loan return to Shandong Luneng Taishan)
28	MF	CHN	Huang Fengtao (to Wuhan Zall)
31	MF	CHN	Chen-Zeng Tailang (Released)
36	GK	CHN	Wu Chao (Released)
40	MF	CHN	Ma Xuan (Released)

=== Tianjin Teda ===
In:

No.	Pos.	Nation	Player
3	DF	MOZ	Zainadine Júnior (from (Portugal) C.D. Nacional)
4	DF	CHN	Pan Ximing (from (Portugal) Leixões S.C.)
5	DF	AUS	Aleksandar Jovanović (from (South Korea) Jeju United)
9	FW	SEN	Mbaye Diagne (from (Hungary) Újpest FC)
10	FW	COL	Fredy Montero (from (Portugal) Sporting C.P.)
16	MF	CHN	Guo Yi (from (Portugal) Leixões S.C.)
27	FW	CHN	Qu Bo (from Qingdao Hainiu)
32	FW	CHN	Li Zhibin (from (Spain) UE Cornellà)
42	MF	CHN	Gao Jiarun (from Guangzhou R&F)
51	GK	CHN	Lu Zheyu (loan return from Baotou Nanjiao)

Out:

No.	Pos.	Nation	Player
3	DF	IRI	Morteza Pouraliganji (to (Qatar) Al Sadd SC)
4	DF	BRA	Lucas Fonseca (to (Brazil) Bahia)
9	FW	ARG	Hernán Barcos (to (Portugal) Sporting C.P.)
14	FW	CHN	Zhou Liao (loan to Wuhan Zall)
16	MF	CHN	Sang Yifei (to Hebei China Fortune)
18	DF	CHN	Li Hongyang (Released)
21	MF	CHN	Wang Yi (Released)
31	MF	ROU	Cristian Tănase (to (Turkey) Sivasspor)
37	MF	CHN	Ma Leilei (Released)
41	MF	CHN	Wang Guanyi (loan to Jingtie Locomotive)
42	MF	CHN	Zheng Jin (Released)
43	FW	CHN	Gu Jinjin (Released)
44	MF	CHN	Song Qi (loan to Jingtie Locomotive)
47	DF	CHN	Zhang Wu (Released)
48	FW	CHN	Du Junpeng (loan to Baoding Yingli Yitong)
50	DF	CHN	Xiang Xin (Released)
54	DF	CHN	Wu Peng (Released)
55	DF	CHN	Jiang Weipeng (to Hainan Seamen)

=== Yanbian Funde ===
In:

No.	Pos.	Nation	Player
3	DF	CHN	Han Xuan (from Beijing BG)
5	DF	SRB	Nikola Petković (from (Belgium) K.V.C. Westerlo)
7	MF	CHN	Han Guanghui (from Beijing BIT)
8	MF	CHN	Chi Zhongguo (from Shanghai Shenxin)
9	FW	KOR	Kim Seung-dae (from (South Korea) Pohang Steelers)
10	MF	GAM	Bubacarr Trawally (from Hangzhou Greentown)
11	MF	CHN	Cui Ren (from Shanghai Shenxin)
14	MF	KOR	Yoon Bit-garam (from (South Korea) Jeju United)
31	GK	CHN	Dong Jialin (from Shanghai SIPG)
42	DF	CHN	Tian Yinong (from Shenyang City)

Out:

No.	Pos.	Nation	Player
5	DF	CHN	Chen Xiao (to Hangzhou Greentown)
7	FW	CHN	Gao Wanguo (to Yinchuan Helanshan)
9	MF	GAM	Bubacarr Trawally (loan return to Hangzhou Greentown)
10	FW	BRA	Jaílton Paraíba (to Dalian Transcendence)
11	MF	CHN	Li Chenglin (to Liaoning Whowin)
29	GK	CHN	Gao Chuang (Released)
30	DF	CHN	Wang Meng (to Shenyang Dongjin)
41	FW	CHN	Wen Huyi (Retired)
44	GK	CHN	Jin Xin (Released)
46	MF	CHN	Zheng Chunfeng (Released)
47	MF	CHN	Nan Song (Released)
52	FW	CHN	Liu Yongjie (Released)
54	FW	CHN	Shen Guo (Released)
56	DF	CHN	Li Xianjun (Released)
57	DF	CHN	Jin Changguo (Released)
58	MF	CHN	Liu Chun (to Chengdu Qianbao)
59	MF	CHN	Li Jun (Released)
60	FW	CHN	Piao Wanzhe (Released)

== League One ==
=== Beijing BG ===
In:

No.	Pos.	Nation	Player
3	DF	CHN	Liu Yi (from Harbin Yiteng)
14	FW	NGR	Leke James (from (Norway) Aalesunds FK)
16	MF	CHN	Yu Tao (from Shanghai Shenxin)
19	MF	CHN	Zhang Junzhe (Free Agent)
20	MF	CHN	Bu Xin (from Harbin Yiteng)
25	GK	CHN	Liu Tianxin (from Beijing BIT)
49	MF	CHN	Song Yi (from Henan Jianye)
51	FW	CHN	Gong Zheng (from Beijing Guoan)
53	MF	CHN	Sun Chaofan (Free Agent)

Out:

No.	Pos.	Nation	Player
8	MF	CHN	Lu Jiang (Retired)
13	DF	CHN	Han Xuan (to Yanbian Changbaishan)
14	MF	CHN	Li Zhendong (to Dalian Yifang)
15	DF	CHN	Cui Wei (to Beijing BIT)
27	FW	SRB	Danko Lazović (to (Slovenia) Olimpija)
33	FW	HKG	Godfred Karikari (to Qingdao Hainiu)
45	GK	CHN	Cao Ziyi (Released)
59	DF	CHN	Chen Fangzhou (to Lijiang Jiayunhao)

=== Beijing Renhe ===
In:

No.	Pos.	Nation	Player
6	DF	CHN	Wang Qiang (from Shandong Luneng Taishan)
7	FW	CRO	Nikica Jelavić (from (England) West Ham United)
8	FW	CHN	Zhang Yuan (loan from Guangzhou R&F)
9	FW	CHN	Han Peng (from Shandong Luneng Taishan)
17	DF	CHN	Sun Jihai (from Chongqing Lifan)
18	DF	CHN	Yi Teng (loan from Guangzhou Evergrande Taobao)
30	MF	CHN	Feng Renliang (from Guangzhou Evergrande Taobao)
-	MF	CHN	Guo Sheng (loan return from Nei Mongol Zhongyou)
-	MF	CHN	Tan Liwei (loan return from Tianjin Locomotive)
-	MF	CHN	Yang Lei (loan return from Lijiang Jiayunhao)

Out:

No.	Pos.	Nation	Player
6	MF	CHN	Fan Yunlong (loan to Guizhou Zhicheng)
8	DF	TPE	Xavier Chen (to (Belgium) KV Mechelen)
11	FW	BRA	Ricardo Santos (to (Japan) Cerezo Osaka)
17	FW	BRA	Hyuri (to (Brazil) Atlético Mineiro)
27	DF	KOR	Park Ju-sung (to (South Korea) Gyeongnam FC)
29	GK	CHN	Sheng Peng (to Heilongjiang Lava Spring)
30	MF	CHN	Feng Renliang (loan return to Guangzhou Evergrande Taobao)
35	DF	CHN	Tang Yuan (to Yinchuan Helanshan)
38	DF	CHN	Hu Jing (Released)
46	DF	CHN	Huang Gengji (to Heilongjiang Lava Spring)
48	MF	CHN	Ji Yong (Released)
-	MF	CHN	Guo Sheng (to Nei Mongol Zhongyou)
-	MF	CHN	Tan Liwei (to Heilongjiang Lava Spring)
-	MF	CHN	Yang Lei (to Heilongjiang Lava Spring)
-	MF	CHN	Yu Wenhe (loan to Nei Mongol Zhongyou)
-	MF	CHN	Li Shuai (loan to Nei Mongol Zhongyou)

=== Dalian Transcendence ===
In:

No.	Pos.	Nation	Player
1	GK	CHN	Cui Kai (Free Agent)
4	MF	CHN	Zhang Gong (Free Agent)
5	MF	CHN	Xue Ya'nan (from Qingdao Huanghai)
6	MF	CHN	Han Xu (from Harbin Yiteng)
7	FW	BRA	Jaílton Paraíba (from Yanbian Changbaishan)
10	FW	KOS	Erton Fejzullahu (from Beijing Guoan)
16	DF	SWE	David Fällman (from (Sweden) Gefle IF)
28	MF	CHN	Zhang Jian (from Wuhan Zall)
29	MF	CHN	Sheng Jun (Free Agent)
32	FW	CHN	Nan Yunqi (from Dalian Yifang)
33	MF	CHN	Wang Hongyou (from Hangzhou Greentown)
37	MF	CHN	Liu Yingchen (from Dalian Yifang)
43	MF	CHN	Hong Youpeng (from Chongqing Lifan)

Out:

No.	Pos.	Nation	Player
20	MF	CHN	Yan Song (Retired)
29	MF	CHN	Cong Zhen (to Shanghai Shenhua)
32	FW	CHN	Nan Yunqi (loan return to Dalian Aerbin)
34	DF	CHN	Zhang Hongjiang (Released)

=== Dalian Yifang ===
In:

No.	Pos.	Nation	Player
3	DF	CHN	Cao Xuan (from Hangzhou Greentown)
4	DF	CHN	Li Shuai (Free Agent)
5	DF	CHN	Wu Yuyin (from Shanghai SIPG)
7	MF	CHN	Li Zhendong (from Beijing BG)
9	FW	ZIM	Nyasha Mushekwi (from (South Africa) Mamelodi Sundowns)
10	MF	ROU	Constantin Budescu (from (Romania) Astra Giurgiu)
11	FW	SLE	Mohamed Bangura (from (Sweden) AIK Fotboll)
14	MF	CHN	Qu Xiaohui (Free Agent)
-	FW	CHN	Nan Yunqi (loan return from Dalian Transcendence)

Out:

No.	Pos.	Nation	Player
3	DF	SWE	Niklas Backman (to (Denmark) AGF)
5	DF	CHN	Zou You (Released)
9	FW	SWE	Mathias Ranégie (loan return to (England) Watford F.C.)
10	MF	CHN	Chen Tao (Released)
11	FW	BRA	Bruno Meneghel (to (Japan) Cerezo Osaka)
21	MF	CHN	Liu Yingchen (to Dalian Transcendence)
22	FW	CHN	Duan Yunzi (loan to Shenyang City)
33	MF	CHN	Sun Guowen (Released)
46	FW	CHN	Yan Peng (loan to Shenyang City)
48	GK	CHN	Liu Yipeng (Released)
53	MF	CHN	Zhou Chenye (Released)
60	GK	CHN	Zhang Zhenqiang (to Liaoning Whowin)
-	FW	CHN	Nan Yunqi (to Dalian Transcendence)

=== Guizhou Hengfeng Zhicheng ===
In:

No.	Pos.	Nation	Player
3	MF	HKG	Festus Baise (from (Hong Kong) Eastern)
10	FW	BRA	Mazola (from (Portugal) Portimonense)
11	MF	HKG	Au Yeung Yiu Chung (from (Portugal) GS Loures)
12	MF	CHN	Tang Xin (from Guangzhou R&F)
18	MF	CHN	Liang Yanfeng (from Jiangsu Yancheng Dingli)
31	MF	CHN	Fan Yunlong (loan from Guizhou Renhe)
33	GK	CHN	Li Lei (Free Agent)

Out:

No.	Pos.	Nation	Player
2	DF	CHN	Xia Jin (to Chengdu Qianbao)
10	MF	CHN	Feng Kai (Released)
11	MF	CHN	Liu Chao (Released)
13	DF	CHN	Zhang Yujia (Released)
14	MF	CHN	Ouyang Xue (to Meizhou Kejia)
18	MF	CHN	Li Jiaqi (Released)
22	GK	CHN	Shi Ning (Released)
25	MF	CHN	Yang Jian (to Shenyang City)
26	DF	CHN	Yu Tianzhu (Released)
33	FW	BRA	Rodrigo (to Zhejiang Yiteng)

=== Hunan Billows ===
In:

No.	Pos.	Nation	Player
5	MF	SLO	Rok Elsner (from (Poland) Olimpia Grudziądz)
10	MF	COL	Jhon Valoy (from (Colombia) Once Caldas)
17	DF	CHN	Li Zhaonan (Free Agent)
23	DF	CHN	Liu Qing (from Tianjin Quanjian)
32	DF	CHN	Hao Shuang (from Hebei China Fortune)

Out:

No.	Pos.	Nation	Player
3	DF	CHN	Wang Yongxin (to Nantong Zhiyun)
5	DF	SRB	Stevan Bates (to (Serbia) FK Rad)
10	FW	MNE	Igor Burzanović (to (Montenegro) Budućnost Podgorica)
23	DF	CHN	Zhao Xudong (to Baoding Yingli Yitong)
25	MF	CHN	Liu Chao (to Shanghai Shenxin)
42	MF	TPE	Chen Wei-chuan (Released)
43	MF	TPE	Wu Chun-ching (Released)
43	MF	CHN	Yang Sizhuang (Released)
46	DF	CHN	Chen Zhen (Released)
47	MF	CHN	Hao Shuai (loan to Shanghai JuJu Sports)
50	FW	CHN	Fang Zhengyang (to Chongqing Lifan)
54	DF	CHN	Liao Lingkai (Released)
55	FW	CHN	He Lei (Released)
58	DF	CHN	Chen Gang (Released)
59	DF	CHN	Yue Mingfeng (Released)
60	MF	CHN	Wu Lei (Released)

=== Meizhou Kejia ===
In:

No.	Pos.	Nation	Player
2	DF	HKG	Lee Chi Ho (from Hong Kong Rangers)
3	DF	SLE	Gibril Sankoh (from (Netherlands) Roda JC Kerkrade)
7	MF	CHN	Ouyang Xue (from Guizhou Zhicheng)
8	MF	GAB	Merlin Tandjigora (from (Portugal) Leixões S.C.)
9	FW	BRA	Japa (from (South Korea) Suwon FC)
11	FW	TPE	Onur Dogan (from (Chinese Taipei) Tatung F.C.)
16	MF	CHN	Ba Dun (loan from Beijing Guoan)
20	GK	CHN	Luo Zuqing (from Henan Jianye)
32	DF	CHN	Li Bowen (loan from Beijing Guoan)

Out:

No.	Pos.	Nation	Player
7	MF	CHN	Yang He (loan return to Changchun Yatai)
8	FW	CHN	Yang Chen (to Shenzhen Renren)
9	FW	CHN	Ji Jun (to Shanghai Shenxin)
11	MF	CHN	Peng Shaoxiong (to (Macau) Windsor Arch Ka I)
12	DF	CHN	Sun Yifan (to Shanghai Shenxin)
18	FW	CHN	Cao Tianbao (to Shenzhen Renren)
20	DF	CHN	Tu Dongxu (to Guangzhou R&F)
23	MF	CHN	Pan Jia (to Meixian Hakka)
27	FW	CHN	Jiang Zhongxiao (to Lijiang Jiayunhao)
32	GK	CHN	Li Yupeng (Released)

=== Nei Mongol Zhongyou ===
In:

No.	Pos.	Nation	Player
2	FW	CHN	Li Chenguang (from Qingdao Jonoon)
3	DF	CHN	Luo Hao (from Guangzhou R&F)
8	MF	CHN	Quan Lei (from Qingdao Jonoon)
9	MF	SRB	Nenad Milijaš (from Hebei China Fortune)
11	MF	CHN	Nizamidin Afanti (Free Agent)
12	MF	CHN	Zou Yucheng (from Yinchuan Helanshan)
14	MF	CHN	Yu Wenhe (loan from Beijing Renhe)
21	MF	CHN	Li Shuai (loan from Beijing Renhe)
27	DF	CHN	Wang Bo (from Liaoning Whowin)
33	MF	CHN	Guo Sheng (from Beijing Renhe)
41	FW	CHN	Wang Yida (Free Agent)
42	FW	CHN	Wang Haoyu (Free Agent)
43	DF	CHN	Geng Tianming (from Henan Jianye)
-	MF	CHN	Zhang Xingbo (loan return from Meixian Hakka)

Out:

No.	Pos.	Nation	Player
2	DF	CHN	Li Longri (to Jiangxi Liansheng)
3	DF	CHN	Zhao Zuojun (to Shanghai Shenxin)
8	FW	CHN	Hou Zhe (to Meixian Hakka)
9	FW	BRA	William Gomes Martins (to (Brazil) Joinville)
11	MF	CHN	Zhang Xingbo (to Meixian Hakka)
20	MF	CHN	Zhang Yong (to Meixian Hakka)
26	MF	CHN	Wang Fei (loan return to Shanghai Greenland Shenhua)
29	DF	CHN	Li Boyang (loan to Jingtie Locomotive)
35	MF	CHN	Guo Sheng (loan return to Guizhou Renhe)
41	DF	CHN	Meng Chao (Released)
46	FW	CHN	Bian Feng (Released)

=== Qingdao Huanghai ===
In:

No.	Pos.	Nation	Player
3	MF	CHN	Fan Lingjiang (from Shanghai Shenhua)
4	DF	CHN	Xu Yougang (loan from Shanghai Shenhua)
10	FW	BRA	Yuri (from (Spain) SD Ponferradina)
11	FW	CHN	Bari Mamatil (from Jiangsu Suning)
21	DF	ESP	Martí Crespí (Free Agent)
25	MF	CHN	Jiang Kun (from Shanghai Shenhua)
29	MF	CHN	Pan Weihao (loan from Shanghai Shenhua)
30	DF	CHN	Shi Zhe (from Chongqing Lifan)
32	DF	CHN	Leng Shiao (loan from Shanghai Shenhua)
33	FW	HKG	Godfred Karikari (from Beijing BG)
42	MF	CHN	Li Yikai (Free Agent)
43	DF	CHN	Zhang Zongzheng (from Shanghai Shenhua)
53	MF	CHN	Cao Zhen (Free Agent)
56	DF	CHN	Yu Yang (from Sichuan Longfor)
60	FW	CHN	Liu Hangcheng (Free Agent)

Out:

No.	Pos.	Nation	Player
2	DF	CHN	Chen Long (Released)
3	DF	CHN	Liu Xiaofeng (Released)
7	FW	KOR	Kim Seung-yong (to (Thailand) Buriram United)
11	MF	CHN	Xue Ya'nan (to Dalian Transcendence)
17	DF	CHN	Shi Zhe (loan return to Chongqing Lifan)
21	DF	CHN	Hu Bowen (loan return to Guangzhou Evergrande Taobao)
23	FW	CHN	Qu Bo (to Tianjin Teda)
25	DF	CHN	Li Kai (to Shijiazhuang Ever Bright)
29	MF	CHN	Chi Jinyu (Released)
32	MF	URU	Julio Gutiérrez (loan return to Beijing BIT)
42	MF	CHN	Zheng Fengwei (Released)
43	MF	CHN	Yue Runhao (Released)
44	FW	CHN	Bu Nan (Released)
48	DF	CHN	Jiang Bin (Released)

=== Qingdao Jonoon ===
In:

No.	Pos.	Nation	Player
9	FW	HON	Eddie Hernández (loan from (Honduras) C.D. Motagua)
10	MF	CHN	Wang Jianwen (from Jiangxi Liansheng)
15	FW	BUL	Chigozie Udoji (from (Belarus) Dinamo Minsk)
26	DF	BRA	Johnny (from Shanghai Shenxin)
-	MF	CHN	Pan Yuchen (loan return from Anhui Litian)

Out:

No.	Pos.	Nation	Player
4	DF	CHN	Zhao Peng (to Chengdu Qianbao)
8	MF	CHN	Wang Jun (Released)
9	FW	BRA	Deivdy Reis (to (Thailand) Chainat Hornbill)
10	FW	CIV	Ismaël Béko Fofana (loan return to (Serbia) FK Partizan)
12	MF	CHN	Hu Jun (loan to Yinchuan Helanshan)
13	MF	CHN	Quan Lei (to Nei Mongol Zhongyou)
14	MF	BRA	Rogerinho (to (Brazil) Capivariano)
20	MF	HON	Jorge Claros (to (Costa Rica) Alajuelense)
22	GK	CHN	Liu Zhenli (to Shandong Luneng Taishan)
32	DF	CHN	Li Peng (Released)
41	GK	CHN	Mou Pengfei (Released)
44	FW	CHN	Lu Yi (to Baotou Nanjiao)
49	MF	CHN	Han Sipei (Released)
52	MF	CHN	Li Hao (Released)
54	DF	CHN	Li Linfeng (Released)
58	DF	CHN	Xu Jingjie (Released)
59	FW	CHN	Song Bo (loan to Yinchuan Helanshan)
60	FW	CHN	Li Chenguang (to Nei Mongol Zhongyou)
-	MF	CHN	Pan Yuchen (to Heilongjiang Lava Spring)

=== Shanghai Shenxin ===
In:

No.	Pos.	Nation	Player
3	DF	CHN	Zhao Zuojun (from Nei Mongol Zhongyou)
6	DF	CHN	Gu Bin (Free Agent)
9	FW	CHN	Ji Jun (from Meizhou Kejia)
10	FW	BRA	Biro-Biro (from (Brazil) Fluminense FC)
11	MF	CHN	Liu Chao (from Hunan Billows)
14	MF	SRB	Nikola Mitrović (from (Israel) Maccabi Tel Aviv)
28	DF	CHN	Sun Yifan (from Meizhou Kejia)
54	MF	CHN	Tan Fucheng (loan return from Anhui Litian)
58	FW	CHN	Chen Yu (loan return from Lijiang Jiayunhao)
-	MF	CHN	Liao Chengjian (loan return from Anhui Litian)
-	FW	BRA	Kieza (loan return from (Brazil) Bahia)

Out:

No.	Pos.	Nation	Player
1	GK	CHN	Wu Yansheng (to Yinchuan Helanshan)
4	MF	CHN	Liao Chengjian (to Heilongjiang Lava Spring)
6	MF	CHN	Hou Junjie (to Guangzhou R&F)
7	MF	CHN	Yang Jiawei (to Jiangsu Suning)
8	MF	CHN	Chi Zhongguo (to Yanbian Changbaishan)
11	FW	BRA	Everton (Released)
16	MF	CHN	Yu Tao (to Beijing BG)
26	DF	BRA	Johnny (to Qingdao Jonoon)
28	FW	CHN	Chen Hao (loan return to Shandong Luneng Taishan)
31	MF	CHN	Cui Ren (to Yanbian Changbaishan)
33	MF	CRC	Michael Barrantes (to Wuhan Zall)
43	FW	CHN	Le Xiong (Released)
47	MF	CHN	Fang Na (Released)
49	DF	CHN	Mu Chen (Released)
52	DF	CHN	Wang Xiaoxing (Released)
53	MF	CHN	Wang Jian (to Wuhan Zall)
-	FW	BRA	Kieza (to (Brazil) São Paulo)

=== Shenzhen F.C. ===
In:

No.	Pos.	Nation	Player
3	DF	CHN	Lü Haidong (from Chongqing Lifan)
7	MF	CHN	Gao Tianyi (Free Agent)
14	FW	CMR	Aboubakar Oumarou (from (Serbia) FK Partizan)
16	GK	CHN	Zhou Yajun (Free Agent)
17	FW	HKG	Paulinho (from (Hong Kong) Kitchee SC)
20	MF	CHN	Xu Liang (Free Agent)
22	MF	CHN	Yang Jiutian (Free Agent)
29	DF	FRA	Helton (from (Bulgaria) PFC Litex Lovech)
32	DF	CHN	Zhang Hongnan (from Guangzhou Evergrande)
45	MF	CHN	Pang Haitao (from Meixian Hakka)
48	MF	CHN	Yu Junzeng (Free Agent)
49	DF	CHN	Zhang Sen (from Baoding Yingli Yitong)
51	DF	CHN	Jiang Linwei (from Baoding Yingli Yitong)

Out:

No.	Pos.	Nation	Player
11	FW	SEN	André Senghor (Released)
12	GK	CHN	Wei Jian (loan to Sichuan Longfor)
16	DF	CHN	Sun Zheng'ao (loan return to Hangzhou Greentown)
17	MF	CHN	Mou Shantao (to Henan Jianye)
27	MF	CHN	Zhang Guofeng (Released)
32	DF	CHN	Zhang Hongnan (loan return to Guangzhou Evergrande)
39	FW	KOR	Kim Young-hoo (to (South Korea) FC Anyang)
43	MF	CHN	Zhou Shengyuan (to Lijiang Jiayunhao)
62	DF	CHN	Liu Zejun (Released)
63	MF	CHN	Jin Kaifang (Released)

=== Tianjin Quanjian ===
In:

No.	Pos.	Nation	Player
1	GK	CHN	Zhang Lu (from Liaoning Whowin)
4	DF	CHN	Liu Yiming (from (Portugal) Sporting B)
5	DF	HKG	Jean-Jacques Kilama (from (Hong Kong) Eastern)
7	MF	CHN	Zhao Xuri (from Guangzhou Evergrande)
8	MF	CHN	Zhang Xiuwei (from (France) Olympique Lyonnais B)
9	FW	BRA	Luís Fabiano (from (Brazil) São Paulo)
10	MF	BRA	Jadson (from (Brazil) Corinthians)
11	FW	BRA	Geuvânio (from (Brazil) Santos FC)
12	DF	CHN	Yan Zihao (from (Portugal) Oriental Dragon)
16	MF	CHN	Zheng Dalun (from Shanghai SIPG)
18	FW	CHN	Xiang Baixu (from (France) AS Saint-Étienne)
20	MF	CHN	Sun Ke (from Jiangsu Suning)
30	FW	CHN	Zhang Shuo (from Guangzhou R&F)

Out:

No.	Pos.	Nation	Player
4	DF	CHN	Cao Xiaodong (loan to Jiangsu Yancheng Dingli)
6	FW	CHN	Hao Tengjiao (Released)
7	DF	CHN	Liu Qing (to Hunan Billows)
8	MF	CHN	Wang Peng (to Jiangsu Yancheng Dingli)
9	FW	BRA	Nei (to (Brazil) Trindade)
10	MF	BRA	Mário Lúcio (Released)
11	FW	CHN	Zhang Shuo (loan return to Guangzhou R&F)
12	DF	CHN	Fang Wensheng (loan to Jiangsu Yancheng Dingli)
13	FW	CHN	Xiang Baixu (loan return to (France) AS Saint-Étienne)
15	MF	CHN	Ma Xiaopeng (Released)
16	GK	CHN	Zhao Yanming (to Jiangsu Yancheng Dingli)
18	MF	CHN	Yang Wanshun (loan to Jiangsu Yancheng Dingli)
24	MF	CHN	Rong Yu (Released)
25	DF	COL	Juan Andrés Bolaños (to (Peru) FBC Melgar)
30	FW	ENG	Frank Nouble (loan to Nei Mongol Zhongyou)
38	MF	CHN	Zheng Dalun (loan return to Shanghai SIPG)
42	FW	CHN	Yu Yang (Retired)
43	DF	CHN	Bai Yi (Retired)
45	DF	CHN	Ma Weichao (Released)
47	MF	CHN	Li Guangpeng (Released)
48	DF	CHN	Yang Fan (to Jiangsu Yancheng Dingli)
49	MF	CHN	Guo Fei (Released)
50	MF	CHN	Wang Jinming (Released)
51	MF	CHN	Lü Mingqi (Released)
52	MF	CHN	Tian Ye (Released)
53	MF	CHN	Mi Zhiqiang (Released)
54	DF	CHN	Yan Shaoyang (Released)
55	MF	CHN	Sun Jianjun (Retired)
56	MF	CHN	Li Jichao (Released)
58	GK	CHN	Gao Jingjun (Released)
59	MF	CHN	Li Chao (loan to Jiangsu Yancheng Dingli)

=== Wuhan Zall ===
In:

No.	Pos.	Nation	Player
2	DF	CHN	Huang Bowen (loan from Shanghai Shenhua)
6	DF	ISL	Sölvi Ottesen (from Jiangsu Suning)
9	FW	BRA	Guto (from Chongqing Lifan)
10	MF	CHN	Cheng Jin (loan from Hangzhou Greentown)
14	FW	CHN	Zhou Liao (loan from Tianjin Teda)
16	FW	CHN	Yang Chaosheng (loan to Guangzhou Evergrande)
17	MF	CHN	Huang Fengtao (from Shijiazhuang Ever Bright)
19	MF	CHN	Wang Rui (loan to Guangzhou Evergrande)
29	MF	CHN	Wei Zhaokun (loan from Hangzhou Greentown)
31	MF	CRC	Michael Barrantes (from Shanghai Shenxin)
43	MF	CHN	Wang Jian (from Shanghai Shenxin)

Out:

No.	Pos.	Nation	Player
2	DF	CHN	Liu Shangkun (to Liaoning Whowin)
9	FW	ESP	Rafa Jordà (to (Romania) Rapid București)
10	FW	GLP	Brice Jovial (Released)
11	MF	CHN	Zhang Jian (to Dalian Transcendence)
16	MF	CHN	Zhu Cheng (Released)
20	MF	CHN	Li Hang (to Hebei China Fortune)
24	DF	CHN	Long Wei (Released)
25	DF	GHA	Ransford Addo (Released)
27	MF	CHN	Zhang Li (loan return to Henan Jianye)
29	MF	CHN	Yue Xin (loan return to Hangzhou Greentown)
31	MF	CHN	Li Gen (to Zhejiang Yiteng)
43	DF	CHN	Sun Gang (Released)
44	MF	CHN	Xia Tian (Released)
45	FW	CHN	Gao Teng (Released)
46	MF	CHN	Wu Jie (Released)
49	MF	CHN	Yao Daogang (Released)
50	DF	CHN	Zhang Haoran (Released)
51	DF	CHN	Jiang Minwen (Released)
52	DF	CHN	Xu Qigong (Released)
53	MF	CHN	Sun Weiwen (Released)
54	DF	CHN	Yi Xiaolong (Released)
55	GK	CHN	Wang Zhifeng (Released)
61	MF	CHN	Du Chao (Released)

=== Xinjiang Tianshan Leopard ===
In:

No.	Pos.	Nation	Player
9	FW	BIH	Nusmir Fajić (from (Bosnia and Herzegovina) NK Vitez)
10	MF	HKG	Itaparica (from (Hong Kong) South China)
16	MF	BRA	Rudnei (from (Brazil) Avaí FC)
17	GK	CHN	Ekramjan Sirajidin (Free Agent)
30	FW	CHN	Shewket Yalqun (loan from Guangzhou Evergrande)

Out:

No.	Pos.	Nation	Player
7	MF	CHN	Wang Wenhua (Retired)
10	FW	ROU	Cristian Dănălache (to (South Korea) Gyeongnam FC)
16	FW	CHN	Dong Zhiyuan (to Hebei Elite)
17	GK	CHN	Zhu Zisen (to Hebei Elite)
18	FW	CHN	Jiang Sheng (Released)
23	MF	CHN	Wang Weichen (Released)
25	DF	CHN	Elijan Alimjan (Released)
31	FW	CHN	Seliqxan Damxan (Released)
33	FW	BRA	Rafael (Released)
43	MF	CHN	Hudaberdi Bekri (Released)
45	FW	CHN	Irxat Kurban (Released)
50	DF	CHN	Zayirjan Tayirjan (Released)
51	FW	CHN	Chen Minghao (Released)
55	MF	CHN	Perhat Emet (Released)
58	GK	CHN	Ezimet (Released)

=== Zhejiang Yiteng ===
In:

No.	Pos.	Nation	Player
3	DF	CHN	Hao Qiang (from Beijing BIT)
24	FW	CHN	Ye Weichao (Free Agent)
31	MF	CHN	Li Gen (from Wuhan Zall)
33	FW	BRA	Rodrigo (from Guizhou Zhicheng)
42	MF	CHN	Fan Yang (from Beijing Guoan)

Out:

No.	Pos.	Nation	Player
3	DF	CHN	Liu Yi (to Beijing BG)
6	MF	CHN	Han Xu (to Dalian Transcendence)
14	DF	HKG	Liu Quankun (Released)
15	DF	CHN	Geng Zhiqing (to Jiangxi Liansheng)
18	DF	CHN	Li Xiaoting (loan return to Changchun Yatai)
21	MF	CHN	Bu Xin (to Beijing BG)
23	FW	COL	Jair Reinoso (to (United States) Indy Eleven)
33	FW	COL	Juan Núñez (to (Peru) Sport Huancayo)
35	FW	CHN	Yang Zi (to Lijiang Jiayunhao)
43	MF	CHN	Ma Tianming (to Shenyang Dongjin)
48	DF	CHN	Ma Sheng (Released)
49	MF	CHN	He Xin (Released)
50	DF	CHN	Li Biao (Released)
51	MF	CHN	Li Zhenqin (Released)
52	DF	CHN	Zhang Junchi (Released)
53	DF	CHN	Zhang Jihe (Released)
54	DF	CHN	Gao Xiaodong (Released)
55	MF	CHN	Dong Xinjie (Released)
56	MF	CHN	Xie Lincheng (Released)
57	GK	CHN	He Chaoping (Released)
59	MF	CHN	Gao Jianxuan (Released)
60	MF	CHN	Fan Jinrui (Released)
