= Jialin =

- Pronunciation: /d͡ʑia.lin/
- Language: Chinese

Origin
- Meaning: Depends on Chinese characters used to write it

Other names
- Alternative spelling: Chia-lin

Jialin is the Pinyin romanisation of various Chinese given names, also spelled Chia-lin in the Wade–Giles system used in the early 20th century and still common in Taiwan. People with these names include:

- Yen Chia-lin (嚴家麟; Yán Jiālín; 1890–1960), Chinese male educationalist, founder of Scouting in China
- Qin Jialin (秦加林; Qín Jiālín; 1919–2002), Chinese male diplomat
- Xie Jialin (谢家麟; Xiè Jiālín; 1920–2016), Chinese male physicist
- Chen Jialin (陈家林; Chén Jiālín; born 1942), Chinese male film director
- Tang Jialin (唐佳琳; Táng Jiālín; born 1991), Chinese female biathlete
- Hsu Chia-lin (許家霖; Xǔ Jiālín; born 1992), Taiwanese male taekwondo practitioner
- Dong Jialin (董佳林; Dǒng Jiālín; born 1993), Chinese male football goalkeeper

== See also ==
- Jialing (disambiguation)
