= Wang Fei (footballer, born 1989) =

Chinese footballer

Personal information
- Full name: Wang Fei
- Date of birth: June 6, 1989 (age 37)
- Place of birth: Liaoning, China
- Height: 1.80 m (5 ft 11 in)
- Positions: Winger; midfielder

Senior career*
Years	Team	Apps	(Gls)
2009–2010	Changsha Ginde	26	(0)
2012–2017	Shanghai Shenhua	20	(1)
2015	→ Nei Mongol Zhongyou (loan)	7	(0)
2017	→ Shanghai JuJu Sports (loan)	15	(3)
2018–2021	Qingdao FC	62	(3)
2022	Yuxi Yukun		
- * Club domestic league appearances and goals as of 16 May 2022

Wang Fei (simplified Chinese: 王飞; traditional Chinese: 王飛; pinyin: Wáng Fēi; born 6 June 1989) is a male Chinese footballer who plays as a winger or midfielder.

== Club career ==
Wang Fei would start his professional football career for top tier side Changsha Ginde during the 2009 Chinese Super League season and would make his league debut on September 12, 2009 against Dalian Shide in a 1–1 draw. By the end of the season Wang Fei would make a further thirteen appearances and go on to establish himself as a regular squad member within the team, however at the end of the following 2010 Chinese Super League season Changsha Ginde were relegated and Wang Fei was allowed to leave the club. Without a club Wang Fei would decide to train with Changchun Yatai and Austrian side SR Donaufeld Wien before going on a training session at Shanghai Shenhua before the start of the 2012 Chinese Super League campaign where he had a successful trial and was offered a contract form the top tier club. In June 2015, Wang was loaned to China League One side Nei Mongol Zhongyou until 31 December 2015. He was sent to the Shenhua reserved team in 2016.

On 6 February 2018, Wang transferred to China League One side Qingdao Huanghai. He would make his debut in a league game on 11 March 2018 against Dalian Transcendence where he came on as a substitute in a 4-2 victory. This was soon followed with his first start for the club on 4 April 2018 in a league game against Heilongjiang Lava Spring, which ended in a 3-0 victory and his first goal for the club. By the following season Wang had become an integral member of the squad and he would help the team to win the 2019 China League One division and promotion into the top tier.

== Career statistics ==
Statistics accurate as of match played 31 December 2020.

Appearances and goals by club, season and competition
Club	Season	League			National Cup		Continental		Other		Total	
Club	Season	Division	Apps	Goals	Apps	Goals	Apps	Goals	Apps	Goals	Apps	Goals
Changsha Ginde	2009	Chinese Super League	14	0	-		-		-		14	0
Changsha Ginde	2010	Chinese Super League	10	0	-		-		-		10	0
Changsha Ginde	Total		24	0	0	0	0	0	0	0	24	0
Shanghai Shenhua	2012	Chinese Super League	6	0	0	0	-		-		6	0
Shanghai Shenhua	2013	Chinese Super League	2	0	1	0	-		-		3	0
Shanghai Shenhua	2014	Chinese Super League	9	1	1	1	-		-		10	2
Shanghai Shenhua	2015	Chinese Super League	3	0	1	0	-		-		4	0
Shanghai Shenhua	Total		20	1	3	1	0	0	0	0	23	2
Nei Mongol Zhongyou (loan)	2015	China League One	7	0	0	0	-		-		7	0
Shanghai JuJu Sports (loan)	2017	China League Two	15	3	0	0	-		-		15	3
Qingdao Huanghai	2018	China League One	26	3	1	0	-		-		27	3
Qingdao Huanghai	2019	China League One	26	0	0	0	-		-		26	0
Qingdao Huanghai	2020	Chinese Super League	6	0	0	0	-		-		6	0
Qingdao Huanghai	Total		58	3	1	0	0	0	0	0	59	3
Career total			114	7	4	1	0	0	0	0	118	8

== Honours ==
=== Club ===
Qingdao Huanghai

- China League One: 2019
