= Liu Zefeng =

Chinese association football player

Personal information
- Date of birth: 23 February 1996 (age 30)
- Place of birth: Anxin County, Hebei, China
- Height: 1.73 m (5 ft 8 in)
- Position: Midfielder

Team information
- Current team: Jiangxi Beidamen

Youth career
- –2015: Changchun Yatai

Senior career*
Years	Team	Apps	(Gls)
2015	Changchun Yatai	0	(0)
2015	→ Anhui Litian (loan)	0	(0)
2016	Heilongjiang Lava Spring	9	(2)
2017–2021	Kunshan FC	80	(2)
2022-2023	Jiangxi Lushan	51	(0)
2024	Rizhao Yuqi	19	(0)
- * Club domestic league appearances and goals as of 14:01, 25 April 2022 (UTC)

Liu Zefeng (Chinese: 刘泽峰; born 23 February 1996) is a Chinese footballer who plays as a midfielder.

On 10 September 2024, Chinese Football Association announced that Liu was banned from football-related activities for five years, from 10 September 2024 to 9 September 2029, for involving in match-fixing.

== Career statistics ==
=== Club ===
As of 24 August 2021.

Club	Season	League			Cup		Other		Total	
Club	Season	Division	Apps	Goals	Apps	Goals	Apps	Goals	Apps	Goals
Changchun Yatai	2015	Chinese Super League	0	0	0	0	0	0	0	0
Anhui Litian (loan)	2015	China League Two	0	0	1 (Note: Appearances in the Chinese FA Cup)	0	0	0	1	0
Heilongjiang Lava Spring	2016	China League Two	7	1	1	0	2 (Note: Appearances in the China League Two playoffs)	1	10	2
Kunshan FC	2017	China League Two	20	1	0	0	2	0	22	1
Kunshan FC	2018	China League Two	24	1	2	0	1	0	27	1
Kunshan FC	2019	China League Two	23	0	1	0	0	0	24	0
Kunshan FC	2020	China League One	9	0	0	0	0	0	9	0
Kunshan FC	2021	China League One	1	0	0	0	0	0	1	0
Kunshan FC	Total		77	2	3	0	3	0	83	2
Career total			84	3	5	0	5	1	94	4
