= Sun Yifan =

Chinese footballer

Sun Yifan 孙一凡
Personal information
- Full name: Sun Yifan
- Date of birth: 1 May 1989 (age 37)
- Place of birth: Harbin, Heilongjiang, China
- Height: 1.81 m (5 ft 11 in)
- Position: Defender

Team information
- Current team: Heilongjiang Lava Spring
- Number: 29

Youth career
- Shanghai Shenhua

Senior career*
Years	Team	Apps	(Gls)
2008	Shaanxi Chanba	0	(0)
2009–2013	Shanghai Shenxin	56	(0)
2014–2015	Meizhou Kejia	19	(0)
2016–2019	Shanghai Shenxin	97	(1)
2020–	Heilongjiang Lava Spring	8	(0)
- * Club domestic league appearances and goals as of 31 December 2020

Sun Yifan (Chinese: 孙一凡; born 1 May 1989) is a Chinese footballer who currently plays for Heilongjiang Lava Spring in the China League One.

== Club career ==
Sun Yifan started his professional football career in 2008 when he joined Shaanxi Chanba for the 2008 Chinese Super League campaign. In February 2009, Sun transferred to China League One club Nanchang Hengyuan. On 24 July 2010, he made his debut for Nanchang in the 2010 Chinese Super League against Jiangsu Sainty, coming on as a substitute for Zhao Zuojun in the 38th minute. He would be part of the squad that moved cities as the club renamed themselves Shanghai Shenxin.

In March 2014, he transferred to China League Two side Meizhou Kejia. After two seasons he would rejoin his previous club Shanghai Shenxin. After four seasons the club disbanded on 3 February 2020 due to unpaid wages throughout the 2019 league season.

== Career statistics ==
Statistics accurate as of match played 31 December 2020.

Appearances and goals by club, season and competition
Club	Season	League			National Cup		Continental		Other		Total	
Club	Season	Division	Apps	Goals	Apps	Goals	Apps	Goals	Apps	Goals	Apps	Goals
Shaanxi Chanba	2008	Chinese Super League	0	0	-		-		-		0	0
Nanchang Hengyuan/ Shanghai Shenxin	2009	China League One	9	0	-		-		-		9	0
Nanchang Hengyuan/ Shanghai Shenxin	2010	Chinese Super League	15	0	-		-		-		15	0
Nanchang Hengyuan/ Shanghai Shenxin	2011	Chinese Super League	21	0	1	0	-		-		22	0
Nanchang Hengyuan/ Shanghai Shenxin	2012	Chinese Super League	5	0	1	0	-		-		6	0
Nanchang Hengyuan/ Shanghai Shenxin	2013	Chinese Super League	6	0	1	0	-		-		7	0
Nanchang Hengyuan/ Shanghai Shenxin	Total		56	0	3	0	0	0	0	0	59	0
Meizhou Kejia	2014	China League Two	19	0	0	0	-		-		19	0
Meizhou Kejia	2015	China League Two	0	0	0	0	-		-		0	0
Meizhou Kejia	Total		19	0	0	0	0	0	0	0	19	0
Shanghai Shenxin	2016	China League One	27	0	2	0	-		-		29	0
Shanghai Shenxin	2017	China League One	25	1	2	0	-		-		27	1
Shanghai Shenxin	2018	China League One	27	0	0	0	-		-		27	0
Shanghai Shenxin	2019	China League One	18	0	1	0	-		-		19	0
Shanghai Shenxin	Total		97	1	5	0	0	0	0	0	102	1
Heilongjiang Lava Spring	2020	China League One	8	0	-		-		1 (Note: Appearances in China League One relegation play-offs)	0	9	0
Career total			180	1	8	0	0	0	1	0	189	1
