= Liao Chengjian =

Chinese footballer

Liao Chengjian 廖承坚
Personal information
- Date of birth: January 4, 1993 (age 33)
- Place of birth: Shanghai, China
- Height: 1.81 m (5 ft 11 1/2 in)
- Position: Defender

Team information
- Current team: Wuhan Three Towns
- Number: 12

Youth career
- Shanghai East Asia

Senior career*
Years	Team	Apps	(Gls)
2011–2012	Shanghai Zobon	?	(2)
2013–2015	Shanghai Shenxin	3	(0)
2014	→ Shijiazhuang Yongchang (loan)	4	(0)
2015	→ Anhui Litian (loan)	7	(3)
2016–2019	Heilongjiang Lava Spring	91	(4)
2020–2021	Shijiazhuang Ever Bright	30	(0)
2022–2024	Changchun Yatai	72	(2)
2025–	Wuhan Three Towns	43	(1)
- * Club domestic league appearances and goals as of 22 November 2026

Liao Chengjian (Chinese: 廖承坚; pinyin: Liào Chéngjiān; born 4 January 1993) is a Chinese professional footballer who currently plays as a defender for Chinese Super League club Wuhan Three Towns.

== Club career ==
Liao started his professional football career in 2011 when he was promoted to Shanghai Zobon's squad for the 2011 China League Two campaign. On 13 August 2011, he scored his first league goal in a 2–1 home defeat against Guangzhou Youth. He joined Chinese Super League side Shanghai Shenxin in June 2013. On 6 July 2013, he made his Super League debut in a 3–0 home defeat against Guangzhou Evergrande. He couldn't make any appearance for Shanghai Shenxin in the 2013 season after manager Zhu Jiong was sacked on 7 July. On 23 July 2014, Liao was loaned to China League One side Shijiazhuang Yongchang until 31 December 2014. On 1 July 2015, Liao was loaned to China League Two side Anhui Litian until 31 December 2015.

In March 2016, Liao transferred to China League Two side Heilongjiang Lava Spring. He would go on to establish himself as regular within the team and went on to win the 2017 China League Two with the club.

On 29 April 2022, Liao joined fellow Chinese Super League club Changchun Yatai. He made his debut for Yatai on 4 June in a 4-1 win against Guangzhou City, providing an assist for Tan Long. On 22 April 2023, Liao came on as a substitute and scored his first 2 Chinese Super League goals in a 3-2 home win against Dalian Professional, including heading in a 96-minute winner.

On 25 January 2025, Chen signed Chinese Super League club Wuhan Three Towns.

== Career statistics ==
As of match played 31 December 2025.

Appearances and goals by club, season and competition
Club	Season	League			National Cup		Continental		Other		Total	
Club	Season	Division	Apps	Goals	Apps	Goals	Apps	Goals	Apps	Goals	Apps	Goals
Shanghai Zobon	2011	China League Two			-		-		-			
Shanghai Zobon	2012	China League Two					-		-			
Shanghai Zobon	Total				0	0	0	0	0	0		
Shanghai Shenxin	2013	Chinese Super League	1	0	0	0	-		-		1	0
Shanghai Shenxin	2014	Chinese Super League	0	0	0	0	-		-		0	0
Shanghai Shenxin	2015	Chinese Super League	2	0	1	0	-		-		3	0
Shanghai Shenxin	Total		3	0	1	0	0	0	0	0	4	0
Shijiazhuang Yongchang (loan)	2014	China League One	4	0	0	0	-		-		4	0
Anhui Litian (loan)	2015	China League Two	7	3	0	0	-		-		7	3
Heilongjiang Lava Spring	2016	China League Two	18	0	2	0	-		-		20	0
Heilongjiang Lava Spring	2017	China League Two	26	2	3	0	-		-		29	2
Heilongjiang Lava Spring	2018	China League One	20	0	2	0	-		-		22	0
Heilongjiang Lava Spring	2019	China League One	27	2	0	0	-		-		27	2
Heilongjiang Lava Spring	Total		91	4	7	0	0	0	0	0	98	4
Shijiazhuang Ever Bright	2020	Chinese Super League	17	0	0	0	-		-		17	0
Shijiazhuang Ever Bright	2021	Chinese Super League	13	0	1	0	-		-		14	0
Shijiazhuang Ever Bright	Total		30	0	1	0	0	0	0	0	31	0
Changchun Yatai	2022	Chinese Super League	26	0	1	0	-		-		27	0
Changchun Yatai	2023	Chinese Super League	23	2	1	0	-		-		24	2
Changchun Yatai	2024	Chinese Super League	23	0	1	0	-		-		24	0
Changchun Yatai	Total		72	2	3	0	0	0	0	0	75	2
Wuhan Three Towns	2025	Chinese Super League	22	1	1	0	-		-		23	1
Career total			229	10	13	0	0	0	0	0	242	10

== Honours ==
=== Club ===
Heilongjiang Lava Spring

- China League Two: 2017
