= Luo Zuqing =

Chinese footballer

Luo Zuqing 罗足庆
Personal information
- Date of birth: 27 April 1993 (age 33)
- Place of birth: Meizhou, Guangdong, China
- Height: 1.83 m (6 ft 0 in)
- Positions: Goalkeeper; striker

Team information
- Current team: Shenzhen Pengcheng
- Number: 1

Youth career
- 2003–2010: Meizhou Meijiang Sports School
- 2010–2011: Guangdong Sunray Cave

Senior career*
Years	Team	Apps	(Gls)
2011–2014	Guangdong Sunray Cave	15	(0)
2014–2015	Henan Jianye	1	(0)
2016–2018	Meizhou Kejia	21	(0)
2018	→ Shenzhen Pengcheng (loan)	26	(0)
2019–	Shenzhen Pengcheng	30	(0)
- * Club domestic league appearances and goals as of 12 October 2019

Luo Zuqing (simplified Chinese: 罗足庆; traditional Chinese: 羅足慶; born 27 April 1993 in Meizhou) is a Chinese professional football player who currently plays for China League Two side Shenzhen Pengcheng.

== Club career ==
In 2011, Luo Zuqing started his professional footballer career with Guangdong Sunray Cave in the China League One. On 25 May 2011, he made his senior debut in the third round of 2011 Chinese FA Cup against Yanbian Baekdu Tigers, coming on as a substitute in the 89th minute as a midfielder. He made his goalkeeper debut on 1 June 2012, in the second round of 2012 Chinese FA Cup against Hebei Zhongji.

On 5 January 2014, Luo transferred to Chinese Super League side Henan Jianye. On 13 May 2015, he made his debut for Henan in the third round of the 2015 Chinese FA Cup against Anhui Litian. Luo made his Super League debut in a 2015 Chinese Super League match against Changchun Yatai, coming on as a substitute for Lü Jianjun in the 70th minute. He played as a striker for the club in the match.

In January 2017, Luo transferred to Meizhou Kejia. In March 2018, he was loaned to Shenzhen Pengcheng until 31 December 2018.

== Club career statistics ==
Statistics accurate as of match played 12 October 2019

Club performance			League		Cup		League Cup		Continental		Total	
Season	Club	League	Apps	Goals	Apps	Goals	Apps	Goals	Apps	Goals	Apps	Goals
China PR			League		FA Cup		CSL Cup		Asia		Total	
2011	Guangdong Sunray Cave	China League One	0	0	1	0	-		-		1	0
2012	Guangdong Sunray Cave	China League One	0	0	1	0	-		-		1	0
2013	Guangdong Sunray Cave	China League One	15	0	2	0	-		-		17	0
2014	Henan Jianye	Chinese Super League	0	0	0	0	-		-		0	0
2015	Henan Jianye	Chinese Super League	1	0	1	0	-		-		2	0
2016	Meizhou Kejia	China League One	19	0	1	0	-		-		20	0
2017	Meizhou Kejia	China League One	2	0	0	0	-		-		2	0
2018	Shenzhen Pengcheng	China League Two	26	0	1	0	-		-		27	0
2019	Shenzhen Pengcheng	China League Two	30	0	1	0	-		-		31	0
Total	China PR		93	0	8	0	0	0	0	0	101	0
