= Li Chenguang =

Chinese footballer

Li Chenguang 李晨光
Personal information
- Date of birth: January 12, 1990 (age 36)
- Place of birth: Dandong, Liaoning, China
- Height: 1.85 m (6 ft 1 in)
- Positions: Defender; forward

Team information
- Current team: Jiangxi Lushan
- Number: 25

Youth career
- Shaanxi Baorong Chanba

Senior career*
Years	Team	Apps	(Gls)
2008	Shaanxi Star	?	(?)
2010–2011	Shaanxi Baorong Chanba	6	(0)
2012–2013	Hubei China-Kyle	51	(2)
2014–2015	Qingdao Jonoon	1	(0)
2016–2019	Nei Mongol Zhongyou	38	(2)
2017	→ Shaanxi Chang'an Athletic (loan)	21	(5)
2020	→ Inner Mongolia Caoshangfei (loan)	9	(0)
2021–2022	Zibo Cuju	54	(4)
2023	Dandong Tengyue	28	(0)
2024	Hunan Billows	23	(3)
2025–	Jiangxi Lushan	0	(0)
- * Club domestic league appearances and goals as of 20 October 2024

Li Chenguang (Chinese: 李晨光; born 12 January 1990 in Dandong) is a Chinese football player who currently plays for Jiangxi Lushan in the China League Two.

== Club career ==
Li started his professional football career in 2008 when he was loaned to China League Two club Shaanxi Star, which is made up of Shaanxi Baorong Chanba's youth team players, for one year. Li was promoted to Shaanxi Baorong Chanba's first team squad by Zhu Guanghu in 2010. On 23 May 2010, he made his debut for Shaanxi Baorong Chanba in the 2010 Chinese Super League against Qingdao Jonoon, coming on as a substitute for Xin Feng in the 33rd minute. In March 2012, Li transferred to China League Two side Hubei China-Kyle . On 1 March 2014, Li transferred to China League One side Qingdao Jonoon.

On 19 February 2016, Li transferred to fellow China League One side Nei Mongol Zhongyou. On 27 February 2017, Li was loaned to China League Two club Shaanxi Chang'an Athletic.

== Career statistics ==
Statistics accurate as of match played 20 October 2024.

Appearances and goals by club, season and competition
Club	Season	League			National Cup		Continental		Other		Total	
Club	Season	Division	Apps	Goals	Apps	Goals	Apps	Goals	Apps	Goals	Apps	Goals
Shaanxi Star	2008	China League Two			-		-		-			
Shaanxi Baorong Chanba	2010	Chinese Super League	5	0	-		-		-		5	0
Shaanxi Baorong Chanba	2011	Chinese Super League	1	0	-		-		-		1	0
Shaanxi Baorong Chanba	Total		6	0	0	0	0	0	0	0	6	0
Hubei China-Kyle	2012	China League Two	26	1	-		-		-		26	1
Hubei China-Kyle	2013	China League One	25	1	1	0	-		-		26	1
Hubei China-Kyle	Total		51	2	1	0	0	0	0	0	52	2
Qingdao Jonoon	2014	China League One	1	0	0	0	-		-		1	0
Nei Mongol Zhongyou	2016	China League One	11	1	1	0	-		-		12	1
Nei Mongol Zhongyou	2018	China League One	18	1	0	0	-		-		18	1
Nei Mongol Zhongyou	2019	China League One	9	0	1	0	-		-		10	0
Nei Mongol Zhongyou	Total		38	2	2	0	0	0	0	0	40	2
Shaanxi Chang'an Athletic (Loan)	2017	China League Two	21	5	2	1	-		-		23	6
Inner Mongolia Caoshangfei (Loan)	2020	China League Two	9	0	-		-		-		23	6
Zibo Cuju	2021	China League One	23	0	1	0	-		-		24	0
Zibo Cuju	2022	China League One	31	4	2	0	-		-		33	4
Zibo Cuju	Total		54	4	3	0	0	0	0	0	57	4
Dandong Tengyue	2023	China League One	28	0	2	0	-		-		30	0
Hunan Billows	2024	China League Two	23	3	0	0	-		-		23	3
Career total			231	16	10	1	0	0	0	0	241	17
