= Guo Sheng (footballer) =

Chinese footballer (born 1993)

Guo Sheng 郭胜
Personal information
- Date of birth: 7 January 1993 (age 33)
- Place of birth: Shanghai, China
- Height: 1.80 m (5 ft 11 in)
- Positions: Midfielder; left-back

Youth career
- –2010: Shaanxi Renhe

Senior career*
Years	Team	Apps	(Gls)
2011–2015	Guizhou Renhe	5	(0)
2013	→ Shijiazhuang Yongchang (loan)	13	(3)
2015	→ Nei Mongol Zhongyou (loan)	29	(2)
2016	Nei Mongol Zhongyou	10	(0)
2017–2020	Shijiazhuang Ever Bright	61	(4)
2021	Shanghai Jiading Huilong	24	(2)

International career
2012	China U20		
2012	China U22		
- * Club domestic league appearances and goals as of 31 December 2019

Guo Sheng (Chinese: 郭胜; pinyin: Guō Shèng; born 7 January 1993) is a Chinese former professional football player who played as a midfielder or left-back.

== Club career ==
Guo was promoted to Shaanxi Renhe's first team squad by Milorad Kosanović in 2011. He played mostly in the reserve team league and didn't appear for the first team in the 2011 season. He followed the club to move to Guizhou in 2012. On 4 July 2012, he made his senior debut for Guizhou Renhe in the third round of 2012 Chinese FA Cup which Guizhou beat League One side Guangdong Sunray Cave 2–0. His first Super League debut came on 30 September, when Yang Hao was injured and team manager Gao Hongbo decided to give Guo a chance. Guizhou Renhe lost to Guangzhou R&F 1–0, however, Guo made an impressive performance in the match. He became the regular starter of the team after this match and played for the club in the FA Cup final. He made 9 appearances in the 2012 season as the club achieved fourth place in the Super League and runners-up in the FA Cup and gained the entry into AFC Champions League for the first time.

On 14 July 2013, Guo was loaned to China League One side Shijiazhuang Yongchang Junhao until the end of the season. He made his debut for Shijiazhuang on 20 July 2013 in a 1–0 home victory against Chongqing FC. On 27 July 2013, he scored his first senior goal in a 2–2 home draw against Chengdu Blades. Guo scored three goals in 13 appearances for Shijiazhuang in his loan spell. Guo was loaned to League One side Nei Mongol Zhongyou for one season. He made a permanent transfer to Nei Mongol in February 2016.

Guo transferred back to Shijiazhuang Ever Bright who newly relegated to China League One on 15 February 2017. He would establish himself as a regular with Shijiazhuang as they won promotion back into the Chinese top tier when they came runners-up at the end of the 2019 league campaign.

== Club career statistics ==
Statistics accurate as of match played 31 December 2021.

Appearances and goals by club, season and competition
Club	Season	League			National Cup		Continental		Other		Total	
Club	Season	Division	Apps	Goals	Apps	Goals	Apps	Goals	Apps	Goals	Apps	Goals
Guizhou Renhe	2011	Chinese Super League	0	0	0	0	-		-		0	0
Guizhou Renhe	2012	Chinese Super League	5	0	4	0	-		-		9	0
Guizhou Renhe	2014	Chinese Super League	0	0	0	0	1	0	0 (Note: Appearances in Chinese FA Super Cup)	0	1	0
Guizhou Renhe	Total		5	0	4	0	1	0	0	0	10	0
Shijiazhuang Yongchang (loan)	2013	China League One	13	3	0	0	-		-		13	3
Nei Mongol Zhongyou (loan)	2015	China League One	29	2	2	0	-		-		31	2
Nei Mongol Zhongyou	2016	China League One	10	0	2	0	-		-		12	0
Shijiazhuang Ever Bright	2017	China League One	24	2	1	0	-		-		25	2
Shijiazhuang Ever Bright	2018	China League One	24	2	0	0	-		-		24	2
Shijiazhuang Ever Bright	2019	China League One	13	0	1	0	-		-		14	0
Shijiazhuang Ever Bright	Total		61	4	2	0	0	0	0	0	63	4
Fuzhou Hengxing	2020	Fujian FA Super League	-		-		-		-		-	
Shanghai Jiading Huilong	2021	China League Two	24	2	0	0	-		-		24	2
Career total			142	11	10	0	1	0	0	0	153	11
