= Wang Bo (footballer, born 1982) =

Chinese footballer

Wang Bo 王博
Personal information
- Date of birth: May 8, 1982 (age 44)
- Place of birth: Shenyang, Liaoning, China
- Height: 1.83 m (6 ft 0 in)
- Position: Defender

Senior career*
Years	Team	Apps	(Gls)
2001–2004	Shenyang Ginde	27	(1)
2005–2007	Xiamen Lanshi	72	(4)
2008–2010	Changchun Yatai	26	(0)
2009	→ Henan Jianye (loan)	15	(1)
2011–2015	Liaoning Whowin	73	(2)
2016–2020	Nei Mongol Zhongyou	69	(5)
- * Club domestic league appearances and goals as of 31 December 2019

Wang Bo (Chinese: 王博; pinyin: Wáng Bó) (born 8 May 1982) is a Chinese former association football player.

== Club career ==
Wang started his career with Shenyang Ginde in the 2001 league season where he gained regular playing time in his debut season making 17 appearances and scoring one goal, however he struggled to hold down a permanent position the following seasons. This led to him being transferred to second tier club Xiamen Lanshi in 2005 where he gained more playing time and aided the team to a division title and promotion to the top tier in his debut season. He remained with Xiamen Lanshi for several further seasons until the club were relegated from the top flight and disbanded at the end of 2007 league season. Wang would move to Changchun Yatai for a season before he was loaned out to Henan Construction for a season long loan during 2009.

On 28 January 2016, Wang transferred to China League One club Nei Mongol Zhongyou.

== Career statistics ==
Statistics accurate as of match played 31 December 2019.

Appearances and goals by club, season and competition
Club	Season	League			National Cup		Continental		Other		Total	
Club	Season	Division	Apps	Goals	Apps	Goals	Apps	Goals	Apps	Goals	Apps	Goals
Shenyang Ginde	2001	Chinese Jia-A League	17	1		0	-		-		17	1
Shenyang Ginde	2002	Chinese Jia-A League	9	0		0	-		-		9	0
Shenyang Ginde	2003	Chinese Jia-A League	1	0	0	0	-		-		1	0
Shenyang Ginde	2004	Chinese Super League	0	0	0	0	-		-		0	0
Shenyang Ginde	Total		27	1	0	0	0	0	0	0	56	4
Xiamen Lanshi	2005	China League One	23	2	1	1	-		-		24	3
Xiamen Lanshi	2006	Chinese Super League	27	2	0	0	-		-		27	2
Xiamen Lanshi	2007	Chinese Super League	22	0	-		-		-		22	0
Xiamen Lanshi	Total		72	4	1	1	0	0	0	0	73	5
Changchun Yatai	2008	Chinese Super League	18	0	-		0	0	-		18	0
Changchun Yatai	2010	Chinese Super League	8	0	-		2	1	-		10	1
Changchun Yatai	Total		26	0	0	0	2	1	0	0	28	1
Henan Jianye (loan)	2009	Chinese Super League	15	1	-		-		-		15	1
Liaoning Whowin	2011	Chinese Super League	25	0	0	0	-		-		25	0
Liaoning Whowin	2012	Chinese Super League	12	1	4	0	-		-		16	1
Liaoning Whowin	2013	Chinese Super League	13	0	1	0	-		-		14	0
Liaoning Whowin	2014	Chinese Super League	17	1	1	0	-		-		18	1
Liaoning Whowin	2015	Chinese Super League	6	0	0	0	-		-		6	0
Liaoning Whowin	Total		73	2	6	0	0	0	0	0	79	2
Nei Mongol Zhongyou	2016	China League One	13	1	0	0	-		-		13	1
Nei Mongol Zhongyou	2017	China League One	16	0	2	0	-		-		18	0
Nei Mongol Zhongyou	2018	China League One	18	1	0	0	-		-		18	1
Nei Mongol Zhongyou	2019	China League One	22	3	1	0	-		-		23	3
Nei Mongol Zhongyou	Total		69	5	3	0	0	0	0	0	72	5
Career total			282	13	10	0	2	1	0	0	294	14

== Honours ==
Xiamen Lanshi

- China League One: 2005
