= Lei Yongchi =

Chinese football player (born 1989)

Lei Yongchi 雷永驰
Personal information
- Date of birth: 2 January 1989 (age 37)
- Place of birth: Shenyang, Liaoning, China
- Height: 1.75 m (5 ft 9 in)
- Positions: Forward; winger

Senior career*
| Years | Team | Apps | (Gls) |
| 2007–2008 | Shenzhen Ruby | 32 | (0) |
| 2010–2011 | Chengdu Blades | 9 | (0) |
| 2012–2014 | Shenyang Zhongze | 70 | (8) |
| 2015 | Henan Jianye | 13 | (0) |
| 2016 | Liaoning Whowin | 8 | (0) |
| 2017–2019 | Tianjin Teda | 20 | (0) |
| 2018 | → Liaoning Whowin (loan) | 18 | (2) |
| 2020 | Zhejiang Yiteng | 1 | (0) |
| 2021 | Xiamen Egret Island | 17 | (2) |
| 2022 | Heilongjiang Ice City | 19 | (3) |
| 2023–2024 | Liaoning Tieren | 15 | (2) |
- * Club domestic league appearances and goals as of 26 April 2022

Lei Yongchi (Chinese: 雷永驰; born 2 January 1989 in Shenyang) is a Chinese former football player.

== Club career ==
In 2007, Lei Yongchi started his professional footballer career with Shenzhen Ruby in the Chinese Super League. He would eventually make his league debut for Shenzhen on 3 March 2007 in a game against Shaanxi Chanba. In January 2010, Lei transferred to China League One side Chengdu Blades. In January 2012, Lei transferred to China League One side Shenyang Zhongze. On 21 January 2015, Lei transferred to Chinese Super League side Henan Jianye. On 26 February 2016, Lei transferred to fellow Chinese Super League side Liaoning Whowin.

On 26 January 2017, Lei moved to Super League side Tianjin Teda. On 28 February 2018, Lei was loaned to Liaoning Whowin. He would return to Tianjin where he stayed for one more season before joining Zhejiang Yiteng in the third tier.

On 8 November 2024, Lei declared his retirement from professional football on livestream platform.

== Career statistics ==
Statistics accurate as of match played 31 December 2020.

Appearances and goals by club, season and competition
| Club | Season | League | | | National Cup | | Continental | | Other | | Total | |
| Club | Season | Division | Apps | Goals | Apps | Goals | Apps | Goals | Apps | Goals | Apps | Goals |
|---|---|---|---|---|---|---|---|---|---|---|---|---|
| Shenzhen Ruby | 2007 | Chinese Super League | 16 | 0 | - | | - | | - | | 16 | 0 |
| Shenzhen Ruby | 2008 | Chinese Super League | 16 | 0 | - | | - | | - | | 16 | 0 |
| Shenzhen Ruby | 2009 | Chinese Super League | 0 | 0 | - | | - | | - | | 0 | 0 |
| Shenzhen Ruby | Total | | 32 | 0 | 0 | 0 | 0 | 0 | 0 | 0 | 32 | 0 |
| Chengdu Blades | 2010 | China League One | 2 | 0 | - | | - | | - | | 2 | 0 |
| Chengdu Blades | 2011 | Chinese Super League | 7 | 0 | 1 | 0 | - | | - | | 8 | 0 |
| Chengdu Blades | Total | | 9 | 0 | 1 | 0 | 0 | 0 | 0 | 0 | 10 | 0 |
| Shenyang Zhongze | 2012 | China League One | 25 | 2 | 1 | 0 | - | | - | | 26 | 2 |
| Shenyang Zhongze | 2013 | China League One | 29 | 5 | 2 | 0 | - | | - | | 31 | 5 |
| Shenyang Zhongze | 2014 | China League One | 16 | 1 | 1 | 0 | - | | - | | 17 | 1 |
| Shenyang Zhongze | Total | | 70 | 8 | 4 | 0 | 0 | 0 | 0 | 0 | 74 | 8 |
| Henan Jianye | 2015 | Chinese Super League | 13 | 0 | 2 | 1 | - | | - | | 15 | 1 |
| Liaoning Whowin | 2016 | Chinese Super League | 8 | 0 | 1 | 0 | - | | - | | 9 | 0 |
| Tianjin Teda | 2017 | Chinese Super League | 15 | 0 | 2 | 1 | - | | - | | 17 | 1 |
| Tianjin Teda | 2019 | Chinese Super League | 6 | 0 | 1 | 0 | - | | - | | 7 | 0 |
| Tianjin Teda | Total | | 21 | 0 | 3 | 1 | 0 | 0 | 0 | 0 | 24 | 1 |
| Liaoning Whowin (loan) | 2018 | China League One | 18 | 2 | 0 | 0 | - | | - | | 18 | 2 |
| Zhejiang Yiteng | 2020 | China League Two | 1 | 0 | - | | - | | - | | 1 | 0 |
| Career total | | | 172 | 10 | 11 | 2 | 0 | 0 | 0 | 0 | 183 | 12 |
