= Mu Shantao =

Chinese footballer (born 1990)

Personal information
- Date of birth: 1 March 1990 (age 36)
- Place of birth: Dalian, Liaoning, China
- Height: 1.76 m (5 ft 9 in)
- Positions: Full-back; midfielder

Senior career*
Years	Team	Apps	(Gls)
2010	Nanjing Yoyo	12	(1)
2011	Fushun Xinye	7	(0)
2012–2013	Guizhou Zhicheng	26	(0)
2014–2015	Shenzhen FC	32	(0)
2016	Henan Jianye	5	(0)
2017–2021	Nei Mongol Zhongyou	25	(1)
2019–2020	→ Villarrobledo (Loan)	3	(0)
2021–2022	Nanjing City	16	(0)
- * Club domestic league appearances and goals as of 19:28, 31 December 2021 (UTC)

Mu Shantao (Chinese: 牟善韬; born 1 March 1990) is a Chinese footballer.

== Club career ==
Mu started his professional football career in 2010 when he was promoted to Nanjing Yoyo's first squad. In July 2011, he signed for China League Two side Fushun Xinye. In March 2012, he transferred to China League Two side Guizhou Zhicheng and he was part of the team that won the 2012 China League Two division. In March 2014, he transferred to China League One side Shenzhen F.C.

On 26 February 2016, Mu transferred to Chinese Super League side Henan Jianye. On 13 March 2016, he made his Super League debut in the second match of 2016 season against Chongqing Lifan.

On 29 January 2026, Mu was given a lifetime ban for match-fixing by the Chinese Football Association.

== Career statistics ==
Statistics accurate as of match played 31 December 2020.

Appearances and goals by club, season and competition
Club	Season	League			National Cup		Continental		Other		Total	
Club	Season	Division	Apps	Goals	Apps	Goals	Apps	Goals	Apps	Goals	Apps	Goals
Nanjing Yoyo	2010	China League One	12	1	-		-		-		12	1
Fushun Xinye	2011	China League Two	7	0	-		-		-		7	0
Guizhou Zhicheng	2012	China League Two	17	0	2	0	-		-		19	0
Guizhou Zhicheng	2013	China League One	9	0	1	0	-		-		10	0
Guizhou Zhicheng	Total		26	0	3	0	0	0	0	0	29	0
Shenzhen FC	2014	China League One	20	0	2	0	-		-		22	0
Shenzhen FC	2015	China League One	12	0	1	0	-		-		13	0
Shenzhen FC	Total		32	0	3	0	0	0	0	0	35	0
Henan Jianye	2016	Chinese Super League	5	0	0	0	-		-		5	0
Nei Mongol Zhongyou	2017	China League One	15	1	1	0	-		-		16	1
Nei Mongol Zhongyou	2018	China League One	7	0	0	0	-		-		7	0
Nei Mongol Zhongyou	2019	China League One	3	0	1	0	-		-		4	0
Nei Mongol Zhongyou	Total		25	1	2	0	0	0	0	0	27	1
Villarrobledo	2019–20	Segunda División B	3	0	0	0	-		-		5	0
Career total			110	2	8	0	0	0	0	0	118	2

== Honours ==
=== Club ===
Guizhou Hengfeng

- China League Two: 2012
