= Hefei Olympic Sports Center Stadium =

Stadium in Hefei, Anhui, China

Hefei Sports Center Stadium Chinese: 合肥体育中心体育场
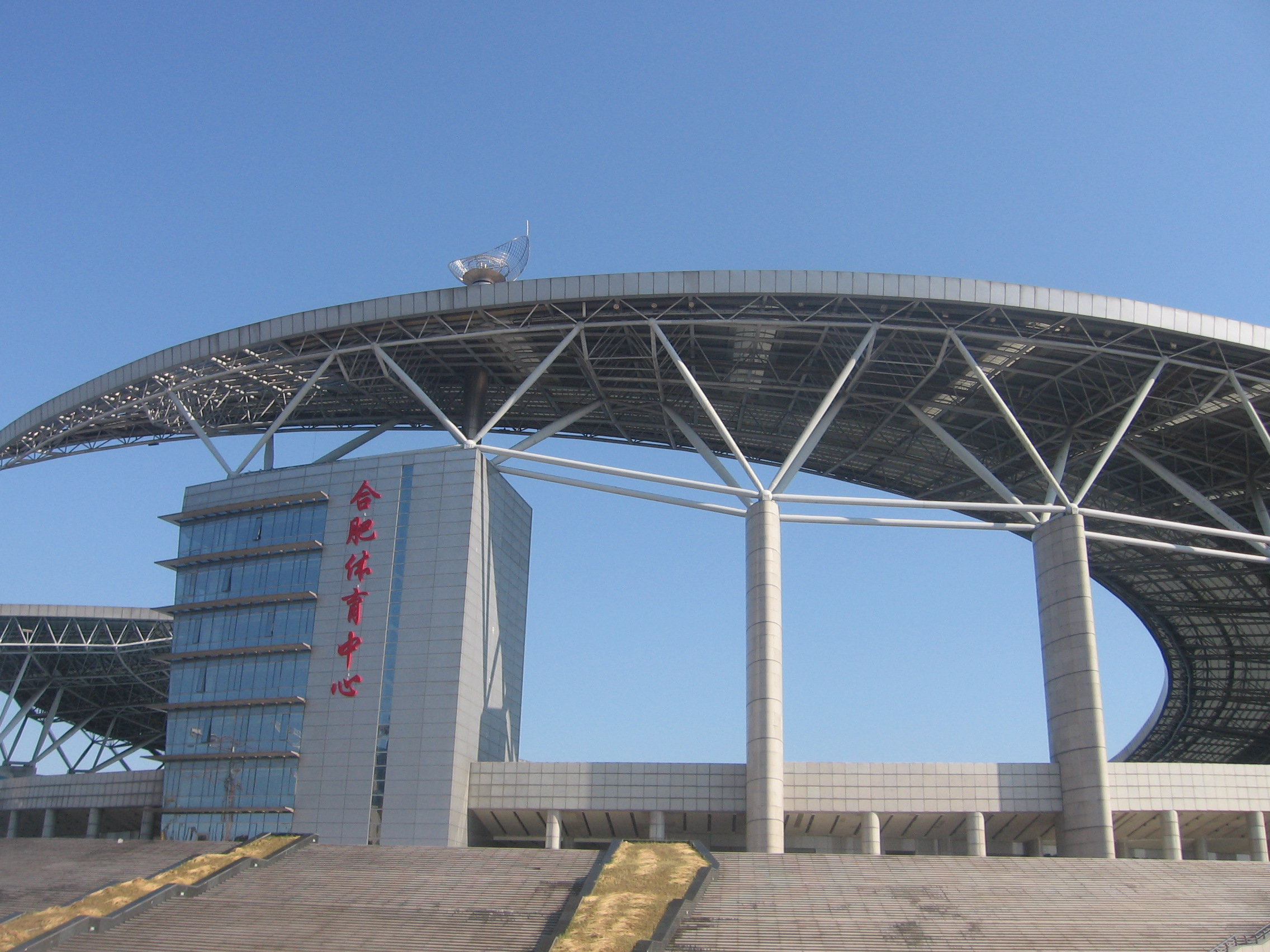
- Interactive map of Hefei Sports Center Stadium; Chinese: 合肥体育中心体育场
- Location: Zhengwu Cultural New District, Shushan District, Hefei, Anhui, China
- Coordinates: 31°47′52.0″N 117°13′21.3″E
- Capacity: 60,000
- Public transit: 3 at Shengbowuyuan (Anhui Museum)

Construction
- Opened: 2008

Tenant
- Anhui Litian (2015)

The Hefei Sports Center Stadium is a football stadium in Hefei, China. It used to host the China League Two side Anhui Litian. The stadium has a capacity of 60,000.

== International matches ==
Data	Opponent	Score
10 August 2011	Jamaica	1–0
15 June 2013	Thailand	1–5

== See also ==
- List of football stadiums in China
- List of stadiums in China
- Lists of stadiums
