= Geng Zhiqing =

Chinese association football player

Personal information
- Date of birth: 10 September 1991 (age 35)
- Place of birth: Dalian, Liaoning, China
- Height: 1.89 m (6 ft 2 in)
- Position: Defender

Team information
- Current team: Hefei City

Youth career
- –2013: Harbin Songbei Yiteng

Senior career*
Years	Team	Apps	(Gls)
2013–2015	Harbin Yiteng	4	(0)
2016–2021	Jiangxi Beidamen	79	(1)
2022-	Hefei City	0	(0)
- * Club domestic league appearances and goals as of 14:01, 6 May 2022 (UTC)

Geng Zhiqing (Chinese: 耿志庆; born 10 September 1991) is a Chinese footballer currently playing as a defender for Chinese club Hefei City.

== Career statistics ==
=== Club ===
As of 24 August 2021.

Club	Season	League			Cup		Other		Total	
Club	Season	Division	Apps	Goals	Apps	Goals	Apps	Goals	Apps	Goals
Harbin Yiteng	2013	China League One	0	0	1 (Note: Appearances in the Chinese FA Cup)	0	0	0	1	0
Harbin Yiteng	2014	Chinese Super League	0	0	1	0	0	0	1	0
Harbin Yiteng	2015	China League One	4	0	0	0	0	0	4	0
Harbin Yiteng	Total		4	0	2	0	0	0	6	0
Jiangxi Beidamen	2016	China League Two	12	0	1	0	5 (Note: Appearances in the China League Two playoffs)	1	18	1
Jiangxi Beidamen	2017	China League Two	13	0	2	0	0	0	15	0
Jiangxi Beidamen	2018	China League Two	10	0	0	0	2	0	12	0
Jiangxi Beidamen	2019	China League Two	27	0	1	0	0	0	28	0
Jiangxi Beidamen	2020	China League One	5	0	0	0	0	0	5	0
Jiangxi Beidamen	2021	China League One	4	0	1	0	0	0	5	0
Jiangxi Beidamen	Total		71	0	5	0	7	1	83	1
Career total			75	0	7	0	7	1	89	1
