= Shi Zhe (footballer) =

Chinese association football player

Personal information
- Date of birth: 29 June 1993 (age 33)
- Place of birth: Yanbian, China
- Height: 1.68 m (5 ft 6 in)
- Positions: Forward; winger; full-back

Team information
- Current team: Qingdao Red Lions
- Number: 33

Senior career*
Years	Team	Apps	(Gls)
2013	Yanbian Changbai Tiger	6	(2)
2014–2015	Chongqing Dangdai	5	(0)
2015	→ Qingdao Huanghai (loan)	30	(2)
2016–2020	Qingdao Huanghai	106	(4)
2021–2022	Suzhou Dongwu	41	(3)
2023–2024	Yunnan Yukun	28	(1)
2025-	Qingdao Red Lions	0	(0)
- * Club domestic league appearances and goals as of 31 December 2024

Shi Zhe (Chinese: 石哲; born 29 June 1993) is a Chinese footballer currently playing as a versatile forward, winger or full-back for Qingdao Red Lions.

== Club career ==
Shi Zhe would start his professional football career when he was promoted to the senior team of his local club Yanbian Changbai Tiger in the 2013 China League One season. The following season he would join Chongqing Dangdai and despite being part of the squad that went on to win the division title and promotion to the top tier he was loaned out to Qingdao Huanghai. At Qingdao he would make his debut in a league game on 14 March 2015 against Hunan Billows F.C. that ended in a 0-0 draw. This would be followed by his first goal for the club on 5 April 2015 against Jiangxi Liansheng F.C. in a league game that ended in a 2-1 victory. On 26 February he would make his loan move to Qingdao permanent. He would become an integral member of the team that would win the 2019 China League One division and promotion into the top tier.

== Career statistics ==
As of 31 December 2024.

Club	Season	League			Cup		Continental		Other		Total	
Club	Season	Division	Apps	Goals	Apps	Goals	Apps	Goals	Apps	Goals	Apps	Goals
Yanbian Changbai Tiger	2013	China League One	6	2	1 (Note: Appearances in the Chinese FA Cup)	0	–		–		7	2
Chongqing Dangdai	2014	China League One	5	0	1	0	–		–		6	0
Qingdao Huanghai (loan)	2015	China League One	30	2	0	0	–		–		30	2
Qingdao Huanghai	2016	China League One	16	0	1	0	–		–		17	0
Qingdao Huanghai	2017	China League One	22	0	1	0	–		–		23	0
Qingdao Huanghai	2018	China League One	23	3	1	0	–		–		24	3
Qingdao Huanghai	2019	China League One	29	1	0	0	–		–		29	1
Qingdao Huanghai	2020	Chinese Super League	16	0	0	0	–		–		16	0
Qingdao Huanghai	Total		136	6	3	0	0	0	0	0	139	6
Suzhou Dongwu	2021	China League One	25	2	0	0	–		–		25	2
Suzhou Dongwu	2022	China League One	16	1	1	0	–		–		17	1
Suzhou Dongwu	Total		41	3	1	0	0	0	0	0	42	3
Yunnan Yukun	2023	China League Two	16	0	1	0	–		–		17	0
Yunnan Yukun	2024	China League One	12	1	2	0	–		–		14	1
Yunnan Yukun	Total		28	1	3	0	0	0	0	0	31	1
Career total			216	12	9	0	0	0	0	0	225	12

== Honours ==
=== Club ===
Chongqing Dangdai

- China League One: 2014

Qingdao Huanghai

- China League One: 2019
