= Chen Hao (footballer, born 1993) =

Chinese footballer

Chen Hao 陈灏
Personal information
- Date of birth: 28 January 1993 (age 33)
- Place of birth: Chao'an, Guangdong, China
- Height: 1.85 m (6 ft 1 in)
- Positions: Forward; centre-back

Youth career
- 2005–2011: Shandong Luneng

Senior career*
| Years | Team | Apps | (Gls) |
| 2011 | Shandong Youth | 14 | (6) |
| 2012–2015 | Shandong Luneng | 0 | (0) |
| 2015 | → Shanghai Shenxin (loan) | 9 | (0) |
| 2016–2021 | Henan Songshan Longmen | 118 | (4) |

International career
| 2008–2010 | China U-17 | | |
| 2011–2012 | China U-20 | | |
- * Club domestic league appearances and goals as of 17 February 2023

Chen Hao (simplified Chinese: 陈灏; traditional Chinese: 陳灝; pinyin: Chén Hào; born 29 January 1993 in Chao'an) is a Chinese footballer.

== Club career ==
Chen Hao played for Shandong Youth in the China League Two in 2011, scoring six goals in fourteen appearances that season. Wu was promoted to Shandong Luneng Taishan's first team by Henk ten Cate in the 2012 season. However, he couldn't establish himself in the club and mainly played in the reserve league. Chen was linked with Chinese Super League side Shanghai Shenxin in the summer of 2014 but two clubs didn't reach an agreement on his transfer. Chen was the highest goalscorer with sixteen goals in the 2014 Chinese Super League reserve league.

On 9 February 2015, Chen moved to Shanghai Shenxin on a one-year loan deal. He made his Super League debut on 8 March 2015, in a 6–2 defeat against Shanghai Greenland Shenhua, coming on as a substitute for Zé Eduardo in the 68th minute. Chen played nine matches for Shanghai in the 2015 season without scoring as Shanghai finished the bottom of the league and relegated to the second tier.

On 26 February 2016, Chen transferred to fellow Chinese Super League side Henan Jianye. On 9 March 2016, he made his debut for Henan in a 1–0 home defeat against Jiangsu Suning. Chen scored his first Super League goal on 6 May 2016 in a 4–3 away defeat against Hebei China Fortune. He scored the other goal of the season at their home against Hebei China Fortune on 21 August 2016, which ensured Henan's 1–0 victory. Chen suffered a knee injury on 12 March 2017 in a league match against Liaoning FC. On 26 April 2017, he was diagnosed as posterior cruciate ligament tear of left knee, ruling him out for the rest of four months. He returned to the field on 10 September 2017, playing the whole match as a converted centre-back in a 2–1 away win against Shanghai Shenhua.

== Career statistics ==
Statistics accurate as of match played 31 December 2020.

| Club | Season | League | | | National Cup | | Continental | | Other | | Total | |
| Club | Season | Division | Apps | Goals | Apps | Goals | Apps | Goals | Apps | Goals | Apps | Goals |
|---|---|---|---|---|---|---|---|---|---|---|---|---|
| Shandong Youth | 2011 | China League Two | 14 | 6 | - | | - | | - | | 14 | 6 |
| Shandong Luneng Taishan | 2012 | Chinese Super League | 0 | 0 | 0 | 0 | - | | - | | 0 | 0 |
| Shandong Luneng Taishan | 2013 | Chinese Super League | 0 | 0 | 0 | 0 | - | | - | | 0 | 0 |
| Shandong Luneng Taishan | 2014 | Chinese Super League | 0 | 0 | 0 | 0 | 0 | 0 | - | | 0 | 0 |
| Shandong Luneng Taishan | Total | | 0 | 0 | 0 | 0 | 0 | 0 | 0 | 0 | 0 | 0 |
| Shanghai Shenxin (loan) | 2015 | Chinese Super League | 9 | 0 | 1 | 0 | - | | - | | 10 | 0 |
| Henan Jianye | 2016 | Chinese Super League | 21 | 2 | 3 | 0 | - | | - | | 24 | 2 |
| Henan Jianye | 2017 | Chinese Super League | 7 | 0 | 0 | 0 | - | | - | | 7 | 0 |
| Henan Jianye | 2018 | Chinese Super League | 25 | 1 | 1 | 0 | - | | - | | 26 | 1 |
| Henan Jianye | 2019 | Chinese Super League | 28 | 1 | 0 | 0 | - | | - | | 28 | 1 |
| Henan Jianye | 2020 | Chinese Super League | 18 | 0 | 0 | 0 | - | | - | | 18 | 0 |
| Henan Jianye | Total | | 99 | 4 | 4 | 0 | 0 | 0 | 0 | 0 | 103 | 4 |
| Career total | | | 122 | 10 | 5 | 0 | 0 | 0 | 0 | 0 | 127 | 10 |

== Honours ==
=== Club ===
Shandong Luneng Taishan

- Chinese FA Cup: 2014
