= Zhao Xiaotian =

Chinese footballer

Zhao Xiaotian 赵啸天
Personal information
- Date of birth: 1 October 1993 (age 33)
- Place of birth: Baoding, Hebei, China
- Height: 1.84 m (6 ft 0 in)
- Position: Forward

Team information
- Current team: Dandong Tengyue

Youth career
- –2012: Hangzhou Greentown

Senior career*
Years	Team	Apps	(Gls)
2011	Wenzhou Provenza	3	(0)
2012–2015	Hangzhou Greentown	3	(0)
2016–2018	Hebei China Fortune	0	(0)
2019-2020	Baoding Yingli Yitong	25	(0)
2020–2021	Hebei Aoli Jingying	12	(0)
2022-	Dandong Tengyue	0	(0)
- * Club domestic league appearances and goals as of 29 April 2022

Zhao Xiaotian (Chinese: 赵啸天; pinyin: Zhào Xiàotiān; born 1 October 1993) is a Chinese football player who currently plays for Dandong Tengyue in the China League Two.

== Club career ==
Zhao started his professional football career in 2011 when he was loan to China League Two club Wenzhou Provenza from Hangzhou Greentown for one year. He was promoted to Hangzhou Greentown's first team squad by Takeshi Okada in the summer of 2012. On 22 March 2015, he made his senior debut for Hangzhou in a 1–1 away draw against Beijing Guoan, coming on as a substitute for Chen Zhongliu in the 77th minute.

On 26 February 2016, Zhao transferred to Chinese Super League newcomer Hebei China Fortune. Initially the club used all their transfer quota and Zhao was moved to the reserves. After three seasons with them he did not make any senior appearances for the club and on 1 March 2019, Zhao transferred to China League Two club Baoding Yingli Yitong.

== Career statistics ==
Statistics accurate as of match played 31 December 2020.

Appearances and goals by club, season and competition
Club	Season	League			National Cup		Continental		Other		Total	
Club	Season	Division	Apps	Goals	Apps	Goals	Apps	Goals	Apps	Goals	Apps	Goals
Wenzhou Provenza	2011	China League Two	3	0	-		-		-		3	0
Hangzhou Greentown	2012	Chinese Super League	0	0	0	0	-		-		0	0
Hangzhou Greentown	2014	Chinese Super League	0	0	0	0	-		-		0	0
Hangzhou Greentown	2015	Chinese Super League	2	0	2	0	-		-		4	0
Hangzhou Greentown	Total		2	0	2	0	0	0	0	0	4	0
Hebei China Fortune	2016	Chinese Super League	0	0	0	0	-		-		0	0
Baoding Yingli Yitong	2019	China League Two	25	1	1	0	-		-		26	1
Hebei Aoli Jingying	2020	China League Two	6	0	-		-		-		6	0
Career total			36	1	3	0	0	0	0	0	39	1
