= Li Chenglin =

Chinese footballer (born 1993)

Li Chenglin 李成林
Personal information
- Date of birth: 16 January 1993 (age 33)
- Place of birth: Yanji, Jilin, China
- Height: 1.77 m (5 ft 10 in)
- Position: Midfielder

Youth career
- Yanbian FC
- 2011–2012: → Fátima (loan)
- 2016: Liaoning FC

Senior career*
Years	Team	Apps	(Gls)
2012–2013	Fátima	0	(0)
2013–2015	Yanbian FC	14	(0)
2016–2020	Liaoning FC		
2020	Yanbian Longding		
- * Club domestic league appearances and goals as of 3 November 2018

Li Chenglin (Chinese: 李成林; pinyin: Lǐ Chénglín; Korean: 리성림; born 16 January 1993) is a Chinese former footballer who played as midfielder.

== Club career ==
Li Chenglin went to Portugal following Chinese Football Association 500.com Stars Project and joined the Segunda Divisão side Fátima youth team system in December 2011. He was promoted to the first team in the summer of 2012. Li returned to China in 2013 and was promoted to China League One side Yanbian FC's first-team squad. On 25 April 2013, he made his senior debut in the second round of 2013 Chinese FA Cup which Yanbian lost to amateur club Wuhan Hongxing 3–0. He made his league debut three days later in a 4–0 away defeat against Henan Jianye, coming on as a substitute for Jin Bo in the 79th minute. He scored his first senior goal on 23 July 2014 in the fourth round of 2014 Chinese FA Cup in a 2–1 home defeat against Chinese Super League side Shanghai Shenhua. Li played four league matches in the 2015 season as Yanbian won promotion to the Chinese Super League.

Li transferred to Chinese Super League side Liaoning FC in February 2016 where he spent the season in the reserve team. He was promoted to the first team in the 2017 season. On 14 October 2017, he made his debut for Liaoning after Zhao Junzhe became the manager of the club, in a 3–3 home draw against Shanghai SIPG, coming on as a substitute for Sang Yifei in the 76th minute.

== Career statistics ==
As of 3 November 2018

Club performance			League		Cup		League Cup		Continental		Total	
Season	Club	League	Apps	Goals	Apps	Goals	Apps	Goals	Apps	Goals	Apps	Goals
Portugal			League		Taça de Portugal		Taça da Liga		Europe		Total	
2012–13	Fátima	Segunda Divisão	0	0	0	0	-		-		0	0
China PR			League		FA Cup		CSL Cup		Asia		Total	
2013	Yanbian FC	China League One	3	0	1	0	-		-		4	0
2014	Yanbian FC	China League One	7	0	1	1	-		-		8	1
2015	Yanbian FC	China League One	4	0	2	0	-		-		6	0
2016	Liaoning FC	Chinese Super League	0	0	0	0	-		-		0	0
2017	Liaoning FC	Chinese Super League	3	0	0	0	-		-		3	0
2018	Liaoning FC	China League One	4	0	2	0	-		-		6	0
Total	Portugal		0	0	0	0	0	0	0	0	0	0
Total	China PR		21	0	6	1	0	0	0	0	27	1
Career total			21	0	6	1	0	0	0	0	27	1

== Honours ==
Yanbian FC

- China League One: 2015
