= Shao Puliang =

Chinese footballer

Shao Puliang 邵镤亮
Personal information
- Date of birth: 6 July 1989 (age 37)
- Place of birth: Qingdao, Shandong, China
- Height: 1.87 m (6 ft 1 1/2 in)
- Position: Goalkeeper

Youth career
- Shandong Luneng

Senior career*
Years	Team	Apps	(Gls)
2008–2015	Shandong Luneng	0	(0)
2016–2024	Cangzhou Mighty Lions	188	(0)
2025	Wuhan Three Towns	16	(0)
- * Club domestic league appearances and goals as of 28 August 2025

Shao Puliang (Chinese: 邵镤亮; pinyin: Shào Púliàng; born 6 July 1989) is a Chinese professional footballer who plays as a goalkeeper.

== Club career ==
Shao Puliang was promoted to Chinese Super League side Shandong Luneng's first squad in the 2008 season. After several seasons at the club, he did not make an appearance for Shandong until the 2015 league season when on 13 May 2015 in a 2015 Chinese FA Cup against amateur team Wuhan New Era with a 6–1 win.

Shao transferred to fellow Super League club Shijiazhuang Ever Bright (now known as Cangzhou Mighty Lions) on 8 January 2016. He made his debut for Shijiazhuang on 11 May 2016, in a 2016 Chinese FA Cup against Beijing Renhe. On 30 October 2016, Shao made his Super League debut in a 3–2 home victory against Guangzhou R&F. Unfortunately he would be part of the team that was relegated at the end of the 2016 Chinese Super League campaign. Shao would remain loyal towards the club and would go on to establish himself as an integral member of the team that would eventually gain promotion back into the top tier at the end of the 2019 China League One campaign.

== Career statistics ==
As of 2 November 2024.

Appearances and goals by club, season and competition
Club	Season	League			National Cup		Continental		Other		Total	
Club	Season	Division	Apps	Goals	Apps	Goals	Apps	Goals	Apps	Goals	Apps	Goals
Shandong Luneng	2008	Chinese Super League	0	0	-		-		-		0	0
Shandong Luneng	2009	Chinese Super League	0	0	-		0	0	-		0	0
Shandong Luneng	2010	Chinese Super League	0	0	-		0	0	-		0	0
Shandong Luneng	2011	Chinese Super League	0	0	0	0	0	0	-		0	0
Shandong Luneng	2012	Chinese Super League	0	0	0	0	-		-		0	0
Shandong Luneng	2013	Chinese Super League	0	0	0	0	-		-		0	0
Shandong Luneng	2014	Chinese Super League	0	0	0	0	0	0	-		0	0
Shandong Luneng	2015	Chinese Super League	0	0	1	0	0	0	0 (Note: Appearances in Chinese FA Super Cup)	0	1	0
Shandong Luneng	Total		0	0	1	0	0	0	0	0	1	0
Shijiazhuang Ever Bright/ Cangzhou Mighty Lions	2016	Chinese Super League	1	0	2	0	-		-		3	0
Shijiazhuang Ever Bright/ Cangzhou Mighty Lions	2017	China League One	11	0	2	0	-		-		13	0
Shijiazhuang Ever Bright/ Cangzhou Mighty Lions	2018	China League One	29	0	0	0	-		-		29	0
Shijiazhuang Ever Bright/ Cangzhou Mighty Lions	2019	China League One	30	0	0	0	-		-		30	0
Shijiazhuang Ever Bright/ Cangzhou Mighty Lions	2020	Chinese Super League	17	0	0	0	-		-		17	0
Shijiazhuang Ever Bright/ Cangzhou Mighty Lions	2021	Chinese Super League	21	0	2	0	-		-		23	0
Shijiazhuang Ever Bright/ Cangzhou Mighty Lions	2022	Chinese Super League	30	0	0	0	-		-		30	0
Shijiazhuang Ever Bright/ Cangzhou Mighty Lions	2023	Chinese Super League	28	0	0	0	-		-		28	0
Shijiazhuang Ever Bright/ Cangzhou Mighty Lions	2024	Chinese Super League	21	0	0	0	-		-		21	0
Shijiazhuang Ever Bright/ Cangzhou Mighty Lions	Total		188	0	6	0	0	0	0	0	194	0
Career total			188	0	7	0	0	0	0	0	195	0
