= Pan Jiajun =

Chinese footballer

Pan Jiajun 潘嘉俊
Personal information
- Date of birth: 8 May 1995 (age 31)
- Place of birth: Guangdong, China
- Height: 1.75 m (5 ft 9 in)
- Position: Midfielder

Team information
- Current team: Kunshan FC
- Number: 22

Youth career
- 2014–2015: Guangzhou R&F

Senior career*
Years	Team	Apps	(Gls)
2015	Meixian Hakka (loan)	5	(1)
2016–2018	Henan Jianye	1	(0)
2019–	Kunshan FC	5	(1)
- * Club domestic league appearances and goals as of 31 December 2020

Pan Jiajun (Chinese: 潘嘉俊; born 8 May 1995) is a Chinese footballer who currently plays as a midfielder for China League One side Kunshan FC.

== Club career ==
Pan Jiajun started his football career in July 2015 when Guangzhou R&F loaned him to Meixian Hakka in the China League Two division. He transferred to Chinese Super League side Henan Jianye in February 2016. On 9 April 2016, he made his debut for Henan Jianye in the 2016 Chinese Super League against Jiangsu Suning, coming on as a substitute for Yang Kuo in the 45th minute.

In the summer of 2018, Pan returned to Guangzhou R&F on a free transfer, however he would only be in the reserve squad until in early 2019 he was released. He would join third-tier football club Kunshan FC on 12 July 2019. He would go on to score his first goal for the club in a league game against Zhejiang Yiteng F.C. on 28 September 2019 in a 3–1 victory.

== Career statistics ==
Statistics accurate as of match played 31 December 2020.

Appearances and goals by club, season and competition
Club	Season	League			National Cup		Continental		Other		Total	
Club	Season	Division	Apps	Goals	Apps	Goals	Apps	Goals	Apps	Goals	Apps	Goals
Meixian Hakka (loan)	2015	China League Two	5	1	0	0	-		-		5	1
Henan Jianye	2016	Chinese Super League	1	0	0	0	-		-		1	0
Henan Jianye	2017	Chinese Super League	0	0	0	0	-		-		0	0
Henan Jianye	Total		1	0	0	0	0	0	0	0	1	0
Kunshan FC	2019	China League Two	5	1	0	0	-		-		5	1
Kunshan FC	2020	China League One	0	0	0	0	-		-		0	0
Kunshan FC	Total		5	1	0	0	0	0	0	0	5	1
Career total			11	2	0	0	0	0	0	0	11	2
