= Gao Jiarun =

Chinese footballer (born 1995)

Gao Jiarun 高嘉润
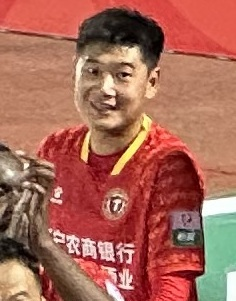
- Gao Jiarun in April 2025

Personal information
- Full name: Gao Jiarun
- Date of birth: 24 April 1995 (age 31)
- Place of birth: Shenyang, Liaoning, China
- Height: 1.83 m (6 ft 0 in)
- Positions: Midfielder; centre-back

Team information
- Current team: Liaoning Tieren
- Number: 27

Youth career
- 2013–2016: Guangzhou R&F
- 2016: Tianjin Teda

Senior career*
Years	Team	Apps	(Gls)
2014	Guangzhou R&F	0	(0)
2016–2022	Tianjin Teda	50	(1)
2023–2024	Guangxi Pingguo Haliao	31	(1)
2025–	Liaoning Tieren	42	(1)

International career^{‡}
2013	China U20	5	(1)
- * Club domestic league appearances and goals as of 22 November 2026 ‡ National team caps and goals as of 3 August 2013

Gao Jiarun (simplified Chinese: 高嘉润; traditional Chinese: 高嘉潤; pinyin: Gāo Jiārùn; born 24 April 1995) is a Chinese footballer who plays for Liaoning Tieren in the Chinese Super League.

== Club career ==
Gao Jiarun joined Tianjin Teda's reserve team on 26 February 2016 from fellow Chinese Super League side Guangzhou R&F. He was promoted to first team squad in July 2016. On 7 May 2017, Gao made his senior debut in a 1–1 home draw against Liaoning FC as the benefit of the new rule of the league that at least one Under-23 player must be in the starting line-up and was substituted off by Li Yuanyi in the 16th minute.

== Career statistics ==
As of 28 September 2024.

Appearances and goals by club, season and competition
Club	Season	League			National Cup		Continental		Other		Total	
Club	Season	Division	Apps	Goals	Apps	Goals	Apps	Goals	Apps	Goals	Apps	Goals
Guangzhou R&F	2014	Chinese Super League	0	0	0	0	-		-		0	0
Tianjin Teda	2016	Chinese Super League	0	0	0	0	-		-		0	0
Tianjin Teda	2017	Chinese Super League	1	0	0	0	-		-		1	0
Tianjin Teda	2018	Chinese Super League	19	0	1	0	-		-		20	0
Tianjin Teda	2019	Chinese Super League	2	0	2	0	-		-		4	0
Tianjin Teda	2020	Chinese Super League	4	0	0	0	-		-		4	0
Tianjin Teda	2021	Chinese Super League	15	0	0	0	-		-		15	0
Tianjin Teda	2022	Chinese Super League	9	1	1	0	-		-		10	1
Tianjin Teda	Total		50	1	4	0	0	0	0	0	54	1
Guangxi Pingguo Haliao	2023	China League One	10	0	0	0	-		-		10	0
Guangxi Pingguo Haliao	2024	China League One	17	1	1	0	-		-		18	1
Guangxi Pingguo Haliao	Total		27	1	1	0	0	0	0	0	28	1
Career total			77	2	5	0	0	0	0	0	82	2

== Honours ==
Liaoning Tieren

- China League One: 2025
