= Zhao Zuojun =

Chinese footballer

Zhao Zuojun 赵作峻
Personal information
- Date of birth: 16 October 1983 (age 43)
- Place of birth: China
- Height: 1.83 m (6 ft 0 in)
- Position: Defender

Team information
- Current team: Shanghai Shenxin
- Number: 36

Youth career
- 2002: Shanghai COSCO Huili

Senior career*
Years	Team	Apps	(Gls)
2002–2008	Shanghai COSCO Huili	122	(2)
2009–2014	Shanghai Shenxin	98	(0)
2014	→ Taiyuan Zhongyou Jiayi (loan)	12	(4)
2015	Nei Mongol Zhongyou	26	(0)
2016–	Shanghai Shenxin	53	(0)
- * Club domestic league appearances and goals as of 3 November 2018 ‡ National team caps and goals as of 16 April 2010

Zhao Zuojun (Chinese: 赵作峻; pinyin: Zhào Zuòjùn; born 16 October 1983) is a Chinese footballer, who currently plays as a defender.

== Club career ==
Zhao Zuojun was a graduate of the Shanghai COSCO Huili youth team before moving to the senior team in the 2002 league season. Under the team's Head coach Claude Le Roy, Zhao was given his chance to establish himself in the 2003 league season and despite Cheng Yaodong coming in as Claude Le Roy's replacement during the season Zhao would still establish himself as part of the team that saw the club just miss out on the league title to Shanghai Shenhua by a single point.

Zhao continued to develop as a defender for the team and remained loyal to the club even when they decided to move to Shaanxi and rename themselves. After becoming a vital member within the team Zhao left the club in 2009 to join second-tier club Nanchang Bayi where he was re-teamed with Zhu Jiong who was a former assistant coach at Zhao's previous club. The move turned out to be a successful one when Nanchang came second in the division and was promoted to the top tier.

In January 2015, Zhao transferred to China League One side Nei Mongol Zhongyou. On 13 January 2016, Zhao returned to Shanghai Shenxin.

== Club career statistics ==
Statistics accurate as of match played 3 November 2018.

Season	Team	Country	Division	Apps	Goals
2002	Shanghai COSCO Huili	China	1	0	0
2003	Shanghai International	China	1	20	0
2004	Shanghai International	China	1	21	1
2005	Shanghai International	China	1	15	0
2006	Inter Xian	China	1	13	1
2007	Shaanxi	China	1	26	0
2008	Shaanxi	China	1	27	0
2009	Nanchang Bayi	China	2	17	0
2010	Nanchang Bayi	China	1	28	0
2011	Nanchang Bayi	China	1	29	0
2012	Shanghai Shenxin	China	1	15	0
2013	Shanghai Shenxin	China	1	9	0
2014	Shanghai Shenxin	China	1	6	0
2014	Taiyuan Zhongyou Jiayi	China	3	12	4
2015	Nei Mongol Zhongyou	China	2	26	0
2016	Shanghai Shenxin	China	2	28	0
2017	Shanghai Shenxin	China	2	23	0
2018	Shanghai Shenxin	China	2	2	0
