= Jialing =

Jialing may refer to:

- Jialing River (嘉陵江), tributary of the Yangtze River, and one of the main rivers of Sichuan
- Jialing District (嘉陵区), Nanchong, Sichuan
- Jialing (迦陵), pen name of poet Chia-ying Yeh (1924–2024)
- Jialing, Shanxi (贾令镇), town in Qi County, Shanxi
