= Dong Jialin =

Chinese footballer

Dong Jialin 董佳林
Personal information
- Date of birth: 6 April 1993 (age 33)
- Place of birth: Anshan, Liaoning, China
- Height: 1.89 m (6 ft 2 1/2 in)
- Position: Goalkeeper

Team information
- Current team: Ningxia Pingluo Hengli

Youth career
- 2006–2012: Shanghai Dongya

Senior career*
Years	Team	Apps	(Gls)
2011–2012	Shanghai Zobon	?	(?)
2013–2015	Shanghai SIPG	0	(0)
2016–2018	Yanbian Funde	8	(0)
2020–2023	Dongguan United	37	(0)
2023–2026	Yanbian Longding	56	(0)
2026–	Ningxia Pingluo Hengli	0	(0)
- * Club domestic league appearances and goals as of 10 March 2026

Dong Jialin (Chinese: 董佳林; pinyin: Dǒng Jiālín; Mandarin pronunciation: [tʊ̀ŋ.tɕjá lǐn];born 6 April 1993) is a Chinese footballer who plays as a goalkeeper for Chinese Champions League club Ningxia Pingluo Hengli.

== Club career ==
Dong started his professional football career in 2011 when he was loaned to Shanghai Zobon's squad for the 2011 China League Two campaign. He joined Chinese Super League's newcomer Shanghai Dongya in 2013. On 21 May 2013, he made his debut for Shanghai Dongya in the third round of 2013 Chinese FA Cup which Shanghai Dongya beat Chongqing Lifan 6–5 in the penalty shootout.

On 3 February 2016, Dong transferred to fellow Chinese Super League side Yanbian Funde. He made his debut for the club on 2 May 2017 in the third round of the 2017 Chinese FA Cup which Yanbian lost to Suzhou Dongwu in the penalty shoot-out. On 2 July 2017, he made his Super League debut in a 2–1 away win against Guizhou Zhicheng.

== Career statistics ==
Statistics accurate as of match played 31 December 2022.

Club performance			League		Cup		Continental		Other		Total	
Club	Season	League	Apps	Goals	Apps	Goals	Apps	Goals	Apps	Goals	Apps	Goals
Shanghai Zobon	2011	China League Two			-		-		-			
Shanghai Zobon	2012	China League Two			2	0	-		-		2	0
Shanghai Zobon	Total		0	0	2	0	0	0	0	0	2	0
Shanghai Dongya	2013	Chinese Super League	0	0	1	0	-		-		1	0
Shanghai Dongya	2014	Chinese Super League	0	0	0	0	-		-		0	0
Shanghai Dongya	2015	Chinese Super League	0	0	0	0	-		-		0	0
Shanghai Dongya	Total		0	0	1	0	0	0	0	0	1	0
Yanbian Funde	2016	Chinese Super League	0	0	0	0	-		-		0	0
Yanbian Funde	2017	Chinese Super League	2	0	1	0	-		-		3	0
Yanbian Funde	2018	China League One	6	0	1	0	-		-		7	0
Yanbian Funde	Total		8	0	2	0	0	0	0	0	10	0
Dongguan United	2020	Chinese Champions League	-		-		-		-		-	
Dongguan United	2021	China League Two	24	0	0	0	-		-		24	0
Dongguan United	2022	China League Two	13	0	-		-		-		13	0
Dongguan United	Total		37	0	0	0	0	0	0	0	37	0
Career total			45	0	5	0	0	0	0	0	50	0
