= Anhui Litian F.C. =

Chinese football club

Anhui Litian F.C. 安徽力天
- Full name: Anhui Litian Football Club 安徽力天足球俱乐部
- Founded: 2014
- League: Chinese Champions League

Anhui Litian F.C. (Chinese: 安徽力天足球俱乐部) is a Chinese football club based in Anqing, Anhui Province.

== History ==
The club was original founded on August 25, 2014, when the local Sports Bureau of Anhui Province along with funding from the Anhui Litian Group (安徽力天集团) formed Anhui Litian F.C. while registration with the Chinese Football Association (CFA) was officially completed on September 3, 2014. In the club's debut season they went on to win the 2014 China Amateur Football League East Zone and advanced to the national stage where they ended finishing ninth. After their successful debut season the club's management were allowed to register the club as a professional football team and play in the third tier by the CFA. In the club's first season as a professional entity the owners were looking for an immediate progression up the Chinese football league pyramid, however the team's Head coach Shang Qing failed to deliver a play-off spot and was replaced by Ding Wei as a caretaker. On July 1, 2015 Darko Nović came in as Head coach, however he too was unable to guide the club to a play-off position at the end of the season. After the 2015 season, they ceded their first team as well as their place in China League Two to Heilongjiang Lava Spring, and competed only in youth competitions.

In 2021, they re-established their first team squad and participated in the 2021 Chinese Champions League, but finished last in the group stage.

== Results ==
Year	Div	Pld	W	D	L	GF	GA	GD	Pts	Pos.	FA Cup	Super Cup	AFC	Att./G	Stadium
2014	4									9	DNQ	DNQ	DNQ		
2015	3	14	5	5	4	23	15	8	20	5^{1}	R3	DNQ	DNQ		Hefei Olympic Sports Center Stadium
