= Jiangxi Dingnan United F.C. =

Chinese football club

Jiangxi Dingnan United 定南赣联
- Full name: Jiangxi Dingnan United Football Club 定南赣联足球俱乐部
- Founded: 31 December 2015; 10 years ago (as Heilongjiang Lava Spring F.C.); 23 January 2025; 21 months ago (as Jiangxi Dingnan United F.C.)
- Ground: Dingnan Youth Football Training Center
- Capacity: 12,000
- Chairman: Li Zhenbo
- Manager: Mao Biao
- League: China League One
- 2026: China League One, 14th of 16
Home colours	Away colours

Jiangxi Dingnan United Football Club (simplified Chinese: 定南赣联足球俱乐部; traditional Chinese: 定南贛聯足球俱樂部; pinyin: Dìngnán Gànlián Zúqiú Jùlèbù) is a Chinese professional football club based in Dingnan, Ganzhou, Jiangxi, that competes in China League One, the second tier of Chinese football. Jiangxi Dingnan United plays its home matches at the Dingnan Youth Football Training Center, located within Dingnan County, groundsharing with Ganzhou Ruishi. Having acquired China League Two club Anhui Litian in December 2015, the club moved to Harbin, Heilongjiang, and changed their name to Heilongjiang Lava Spring Football Club. In 2021, the club changed their name to Heilongjiang Ice City Football Club, before moving to Dingnan County, Jiangxi in February 2025 and changing to its current name.

== History ==
The club was established by Heilongjiang Volcanic Springs Green Natural Mineral Water Co., Ltd. on December 31, 2015, and took over Anhui Litian to participate in China League Two. They appointed Zoran Janković as their head coach, and finished tenth at the end of the 2016 league season. Upon the next season, Duan Xin became the Head coach of the team on December 1, 2016, and he was able to guide the club into not only the play-offs but also surprised the entire league by winning the 2017 China League Two championship, and gaining promotion to China League One for the first time in the team's history.

== Name history ==
- 2016–2020: Heilongjiang Lava Spring 黑龙江火山鸣泉
- 2021–2024: Heilongjiang Ice City 黑龙江冰城
- 2025–: Jiangxi Dingnan United 定南赣联

== Players ==
=== Current squad ===
As of July 2026

Note: Flags indicate national team as defined under FIFA eligibility rules; some limited exceptions apply. Players may hold more than one non-FIFA nationality.

No.	Pos.	Nation	Player
1	GK	CHN	Du Jia
2	DF	CHN	Zhang Yujie (on loan from Shenzhen Peng City)
3	DF	CHN	Zhu Mingxin
4	DF	BRA	Daciel
6	MF	CHN	Zhu Jiaxuan
7	FW	COL	Manuel Palacios
8	MF	CHN	Zhang Zimin
9	FW	CHN	Ma Chenghao
10	FW	CHN	Tang Shi
11	FW	BRA	Erikys
16	DF	CHN	Li Zhi
17	MF	TPE	Chen Po-liang
18	FW	CHN	Fan Bojian
19	FW	CHN	Han Yuchen
21	DF	CHN	Hu Jiajin (on loan from Shenzhen Peng City)

No.	Pos.	Nation	Player
22	MF	CHN	Gao Su (on loan from Hubei Istar)
23	DF	CHN	Du Junpeng
24	GK	CHN	Yang Chen
27	DF	CHN	Wang Sihan
28	MF	CHN	Cheng Huatong (on loan from Chongqing Tonglianglong)
31	GK	CHN	Xiao Yuanming
32	FW	CHN	Zhang Ruiqi
33	DF	CHN	Yan Jiahao
34	DF	CHN	Hao Yucheng (on loan from Beijing Guoan)
38	MF	CHN	Chen Zhiwei
37	FW	SLO	Marcel Petrov (on loan from Shanghai Shenhua)
41	DF	CHN	Li Jiarong
45	DF	CHN	Yang Bowen

=== Reserve squad ===
Note: Flags indicate national team as defined under FIFA eligibility rules; some limited exceptions apply. Players may hold more than one non-FIFA nationality.

No.	Pos.	Nation	Player

=== Out on loan ===
Note: Flags indicate national team as defined under FIFA eligibility rules; some limited exceptions apply. Players may hold more than one non-FIFA nationality.

No.	Pos.	Nation	Player
-	FW	CHN	Shao Shuai (at Ganzhou Ruishi until 31 December 2026)
-	FW	CHN	Yin Peiyuan (at Ganzhou Ruishi until 31 December 2026)

=== Retired numbers ===
- 5 (China) Ren Jianglong, defender (2015–22) – posthumous honour
- 12 – "The twelfth man", dedication to fans

== Coaching staff ==
Position	Staff
Head coach	(China) Mao Biao
Assistant coach	(China) Xu Jining
Assistant coach	(China) Du Yu
Goalkeeping coach	(China) Li Wei

Source: CFA

== Managerial history ==
- (China) Shang Qing (2014–2015)
- (Serbia) Darko Novic (2015)
- (Bulgaria) Zoran Janković (2016)
- (China) Duan Xin (2016–2022)
- (China) Zang Haili (2022)
- (China) Jia Shunhao (2022–2024)
- (China) Wang Helong (2024)
- (China) Liu Jianye (2025)
- (China) Mao Biao (2026-)

== Honours ==
- China League Two
  - Champions (1): 2017

== Results ==
All-time league rankings

As of the end of 2022 season.

Year	Div	Pld	W	D	L	GF	GA	GD	Pts	Pos.	FA Cup	Super Cup	AFC	Att./G	Stadium
2016	3	20	9	4	7	28	24	4	31	10	R2	DNQ	DNQ	8,598	Harbin ICE Sports Center
2017	3	27	15	9	3	44	14	30	54	W	R4	DNQ	DNQ	10,860	Harbin ICE Sports Center
2018	2	30	10	11	9	37	33	4	41	7	R4	DNQ	DNQ	13,550	Harbin ICE Sports Center
2019	2	30	15	9	6	46	34	12	54	4	R4	DNQ	DNQ		Harbin ICE Sports Center
2020	2	17	2	12	3	12	13	-1	18	15	DNQ	DNQ	DNQ		
2021	2	34	15	11	8	50	40	10	56	7	R3	DNQ	DNQ		
2022	2	34	13	7	14	48	48	0	40^{2}	10	R1	DNQ	DNQ		
2023	2	30	9	8	13	42	40	2	35	9	R3	DNQ	DNQ		Harbin ICE Sports Center

- ^1 in South Group.
- ^2 Heilongjiang Ice City had 6 points deducted due to unpaid salaries on 23 November 2022.

Key

	China top division
	China second division
	China third division
	China fourth division
W	Winners
RU	Runners-up
3	Third place
	Relegated

- Pld = Played
- W = Games won
- D = Games drawn
- L = Games lost
- F = Goals for
- A = Goals against
- Pts = Points
- Pos = Final position
- DNQ = Did not qualify
- DNE = Did not enter
- NH = Not Held
- – = Does Not Exist
- R1 = Round 1
- R2 = Round 2
- R3 = Round 3
- R4 = Round 4
- F = Final
- SF = Semi-finals
- QF = Quarter-finals
- R16 = Round of 16
- Group = Group stage
- GS2 = Second Group stage
- QR1 = First Qualifying Round
- QR2 = Second Qualifying Round
- QR3 = Third Qualifying Round
