= Inner Mongolia Zhongyou F.C. =

Chinese football club

Inner Mongolia Zhongyou Nèiménggǔ Zhōngyōu 内蒙古中优
- Full name: Inner Mongolia Zhongyou Football Club 内蒙古中优足球俱乐部
- Founded: 8 October 2011; 13 years ago
- Dissolved: 29 March 2021; 3 years ago
- Ground: Hohhot City Stadium, Hohhot, China
- Capacity: 51,632
- League: China League One
- 2020: League One, 13th of 18
Home colours	Away colours

Inner Mongolia Zhongyou Football Club (Chinese: 内蒙古中优), commonly referred to as Hohhot (Chinese: 呼和浩特), was a professional Chinese football club that last participated in the China League One division under licence from the Chinese Football Association (CFA). The team was based in Hohhot, Inner Mongolia and their home stadium was the 51,632 capacity Hohhot City Stadium. Their majority shareholders were the Hohhot Sports Bureau and Shanghai Zhongyou Real Estate Group.

== History ==
On 8 October 2011 Shanxi Jiayi football club was officially established by the Shanghai Zhongyou Real Estate Group who formed a senior team predominantly comprised from players from the Taiyuan University of Technology. With the aid of the Sports Bureau of Shanxi Province a youth team and women's team was also established and the Shanxi Sports Centre Stadium was chosen to be the club's home ground. They registered to play within the third tier of the Chinese football league system in the 2012 league season while the club chose white shirts and black shorts as their home uniform. In their debut season they however decided to move to the artificial turf ground Wanbailin Stadium and later Taiyuan Institute of Electrical Engineering Stadium to play their home games. On the field the club made their debut in the 2012 Chinese FA Cup where they were knocked out in the first round by Shanghai Pudong Zobon F.C. 3–1 while in their first season they finished ninth within their group.

Inner Mongolia Zhongyou logo in 2016

The club owners decided not to compete within the 2013 league season after a disappointing debut campaign. Wang Bo replaced Wu Jianwen as the club's manager and the team went through an extensive rebuilding process in preparation for the 2014 league season as well as changing the club's name to Taiyuan Zhongyou Jiayi. The rebuilding process would be a big success and the club would come runners-up within the league to Jiangxi Liansheng F.C. that saw them gain promotion to the second tier for the first time. Despite the promotion the club officially admitted the financial difficulties required with the higher level of professionalism and would consider relocating the team to gain the necessary investment.

On 5 January 2015 the Hohhot, Inner Mongolia Government Information Office held a press conference to announce that the Hohhot Sports Bureau would be investing and relocating the team to their city, which resulted in the name change of Nei Mongol Zhongyou.

== Name history ==
- 2011–2013: Shanxi Jiayi (Chinese: 山西嘉怡)
- 2014: Taiyuan Zhongyou Jiayi (Chinese: 太原中优嘉怡)
- 2015–2018: Nei Mongol Zhongyou (Chinese: 内蒙古中优)
- 2019–2021: Inner Mongolia Zhongyou (Chinese: 内蒙古中优)

=== Managerial history ===
- (China) Wu Jianwen (2012)
- (China) Wang Bo (2014–2017)
- (Spain) Raül Agné (2018)
- (China) Wang Bo (2018)
- (China) Chen Yang (2019)
- (South Korea) Choi Jin-han (2020–2021)

== Results ==
All-time league rankings

As of the end of 2019 season.

Year	Div	Pld	W	D	L	GF	GA	GD	Pts	Pos.	FA Cup	Super Cup	AFC	Att./G	Stadium
2012	3	24	8	4	12	31	36	−5	28	9^{1}	R1	DNQ	DNQ	715	Wanbailin Stadium/Taiyuan IEE Stadium
2014	3	19	11	6	2	30	10	20	33^{2}	RU	DNE	DNQ	DNQ	2,500	Shanxi Sports Centre Stadium
2015	2	30	12	7	11	38	32	6	43	6	R3	DNQ	DNQ	18,238	Hohhot City Stadium
2016	2	30	12	5	13	37	35	2	41	7	R3	DNQ	DNQ	9,468	Hohhot City Stadium
2017	2	30	9	8	13	40	47	−7	35	10	R4	DNQ	DNQ	7,656	Hohhot City Stadium
2018	2	30	10	4	16	36	54	−18	34	13	R3	DNQ	DNQ	5,553	Hohhot City Stadium
2019	2	30	15	6	9	35	30	5	51	7	R2	DNQ	DNQ	8,751	Hohhot City Stadium
2020	2	15	2	5	8	13	19	-6	13	13	DNQ	DNQ	DNQ		

Shanxi Jiayi did not compete in 2013.

- ^1 in North Group. ^2 In group stage.

Key

	China top division
	China second division
	China third division
W	Winners
RU	Runners-up
3	Third place
	Relegated

- Pld = Played
- W = Games won
- D = Games drawn
- L = Games lost
- F = Goals for
- A = Goals against
- Pts = Points
- Pos = Final position
- DNQ = Did not qualify
- DNE = Did not enter
- NH = Not Held
- – = Does Not Exist
- R1 = Round 1
- R2 = Round 2
- R3 = Round 3
- R4 = Round 4
- F = Final
- SF = Semi-finals
- QF = Quarter-finals
- R16 = Round of 16
- Group = Group stage
- GS2 = Second group stage
- QR1 = First qualifying round
- QR2 = Second qualifying round
- QR3 = Third qualifying round
