= 2019 Shenzhen F.C. season =

Shenzhen F.C.
2019 season
- Manager: Roberto Donadoni
- Stadium: Shenzhen Universiade Sports Centre
- Super League: 15th
- FA Cup: Fourth Round
Home colours	Away colours

The 2019 Shenzhen F.C. season is Shenzhen F.C.'s 1st consecutive season in the Chinese Super League ever since it started back in the 2004 season and 1st consecutive season in the top flight of Chinese football. This season Shenzhen F.C. participates in the Chinese Super League and Chinese FA Cup.

== Players ==
=== Squad ===
As of 17 July 2019

Note: Flags indicate national team as defined under FIFA eligibility rules; some limited exceptions apply. Players may hold more than one non-FIFA nationality.

No.	Pos.	Nation	Player
3	DF	CHN	Lü Haidong
4	DF	CHN	Qiao Wei
6	MF	CHN	Li Qiang
9	FW	COL	Harold Preciado
10	MF	NOR	Ole Selnæs
11	DF	CHN	Zhang Yuan
12	FW	CMR	John Mary
13	DF	CHN	Wang Weilong
15	DF	CHN	Ge Zhen
16	GK	CHN	Zhou Yajun
17	DF	CHN	Zhou Xin
18	MF	CHN	Xu Yang
19	MF	CHN	Wang Chengkuai
20	MF	CHN	Xie Baoxian
21	FW	CHN	Cai Jingyuan

No.	Pos.	Nation	Player
22	MF	CHN	Li Jinqing
23	GK	CHN	Guo Wei
25	MF	CHN	Wang Peng
26	MF	CHN	Jin Qiang
27	MF	CHN	Zu Pengchao
29	DF	CHN	Wang Dalong
31	MF	CHN	Li Yuanyi
32	DF	CHN	Chen Fujun
36	DF	CHN	Wang Tong
39	MF	CHN	Gan Chao
40	FW	POR	Dyego Sousa
42	DF	CHN	Yeljan Shinar
57	GK	CHN	Wei Jian
58	DF	CHN	Xiang Baixu

=== Technical Staff ===
Position	Staff
Head coach	(Spain) Juan Ramón López Caro
Assistant coach	(Spain) Lorenzo Antolinez
Goalkeeping coach	(Spain) Martín Ruiz
Fitness Coach	(Spain) Cédric Thyus
Technical Analyst	(Morocco) Abdelkader Charii
Fitness Coach	(Portugal) Daniel Castro
Delegate	(China) Wei Shouhua

Last updated: 7 March 2019
Source: First Team Staff

== Squad statistics ==
=== Appearances and goals ===
As of match played unknown

No.	Pos	Nat	Player	Total		Super League		FA Cup	
No.	Pos	Nat	Player	Apps	Goals	Apps	Goals	Apps	Goals
1	GK	(China) CHN	Guan Zhen	0	0	0	0	0	0
3	DF	(China) CHN	Lü Haidong	0	0	0	0	0	0
4	DF	(China) CHN	Qiao Wei	0	0	0	0	0	0
6	MF	(China) CHN	Li Qiang	0	0	0	0	0	0
7	FW	(Norway) NOR	Ola Kamara	0	0	0	0	0	0
8	FW	(China) CHN	Wang Yicheng	0	0	0	0	0	0
9	FW	(Colombia) COL	Harold Preciado	0	0	0	0	0	0
10	MF	(Norway) NOR	Ole Selnæs	0	0	0	0	0	0
11	DF	(China) CHN	Zhang Yuan	0	0	0	0	0	0
13	DF	(China) CHN	Wang Weilong	0	0	0	0	0	0
14	DF	(Senegal) SEN	Cheikh M'Bengue	0	0	0	0	0	0
15	DF	(China) CHN	Ge Zhen	0	0	0	0	0	0
16	GK	(China) CHN	Zhou Yajun	0	0	0	0	0	0
17	DF	(China) CHN	Zhou Xin	0	0	0	0	0	0
18	MF	(China) CHN	Xu Yang	0	0	0	0	0	0
19	MF	(China) CHN	Wang Chengkuai	0	0	0	0	0	0
20	MF	(China) CHN	Xie Baoxian	0	0	0	0	0	0
21	FW	(China) CHN	Cai Jingyuan	0	0	0	0	0	0
22	MF	(China) CHN	Li Jinqing	0	0	0	0	0	0
23	GK	(China) CHN	Guo Wei	0	0	0	0	0	0
25	MF	(China) CHN	Wang Peng	0	0	0	0	0	0
26	MF	(China) CHN	Jin Qiang	0	0	0	0	0	0
27	MF	(China) CHN	Zu Pengchao	0	0	0	0	0	0
28	DF	(China) CHN	Sun Xiaobin	0	0	0	0	0	0
29	DF	(China) CHN	Wang Dalong	0	0	0	0	0	0
30	DF	(China) CHN	Cui Min	0	0	0	0	0	0
31	MF	(China) CHN	Li Yuanyi	0	0	0	0	0	0
32	DF	(China) CHN	Chen Fujun	0	0	0	0	0	0
39	MF	(China) CHN	Gan Chao	0	0	0	0	0	0
Players transferred out during the season

=== Disciplinary record ===
As of match played unknown

No.	Pos	Nat	Player	Super League			FA Cup			Total		
No.	Pos	Nat	Player	Yellow card	Second yellow card	Red card	Yellow card	Second yellow card	Red card	Yellow card	Second yellow card	Red card
				0	0	0	0	0	0	0	0	0
Total				0	0	0	0	0	0	0	0	0

== Competitions ==
=== Chinese Super League ===
==== Table ====
Pos	Team	Pld	W	D	L	GF	GA	GD	Pts	Qualification or relegation
12	Guangzhou R&F	30	9	5	16	54	72	−18	32	
13	Shanghai Greenland Shenhua	30	8	6	16	43	57	−14	30	Qualification for AFC Champions League group stage (Note: Shanghai Greenland Shenhua qualified for the AFC Champions League group stage as Chinese FA Cup winners.)
14	Tianjin Tianhai (D)	30	4	13	13	40	53	−13	25	Dissolved at May 2020 after season 2019
15	Shenzhen F.C.	30	4	9	17	31	57	−26	21	
16	Beijing Renhe (R)	30	3	5	22	26	65	−39	14	Relegation to China League One

Source: CSL
Rules for classification:
- During season: 1) Points; 2) Goal difference; 3) Goals scored.
- After season: 1) Points; 2) Head-to-head points; 3) Head-to-head goal difference; 4) Head-to-head goals scored; 5) Scores of the weight ratio of the reserve league and youth leagues.
  (D) Disqualified; (R) Relegated
  Notes:

==== Results summary ====
Overall								Home						Away					
Pld	W	D	L	GF	GA	GD	Pts	W	D	L	GF	GA	GD	W	D	L	GF	GA	GD
25	4	7	14	22	38	−16	19	4	4	4	15	13	+2	0	3	10	7	25	−18

Last updated: 26 September 2019.
Source: League table

==== Results by round ====
Round	1	2	3	4	5	6	7	8	9	10	11	12	13	14	15	16	17	18	19	20	21	22	23	24	25	26	27	28	29	30
Ground	H	H	A	H	H	A	A	H	A	H	A	A	H	A	H	A	A	H	A	A	H	H	A	H	A	H	H	A	H	A
Result	W	W	L	D	L	D	L	W	L	L	L	L	D	L	L	D	D	L	L	L	D	W	D	L	L					
Position	3	4	5	5	8	8	8	8	9	10	12	13	13	14	14	13	13	14	14	15	15	14	14	14	14					

Updated to match(es) played on 26 September 2019. Source: Competitive matches
A = Away; H = Home; W = Win; D = Draw; L = Loss

==== Matches ====
Win Draw Loss Fixtures

2 March 2019 1	Shenzhen F.C.	3–1	Hebei China Fortune	Shenzhen
20:00 CST	Selnæs 45+3', 86'; Preciado 83'	Report	El Kaabi 38'	Stadium: Shenzhen Universiade Sports Centre; Attendance: 34,986; Referee: Zhang Lei

10 March 2019 2	Shenzhen F.C.	2–1	Tianjin Tianhai	Shenzhen
17:30 CST	Preciado 90+1' (pen.); Zhang Yuan 90+4'	Report	Renatinho 3'	Stadium: Shenzhen Universiade Sports Centre; Attendance: 15,236; Referee: Milorad Mažić

31 March 2019 3	Chongqing Dangdai Lifan	1–0	Shenzhen F.C.	Chongqing
19:35 CST	Mierzejewski 20'	Report		Stadium: Chongqing Olympic Sports Center; Attendance: 27,838; Referee: Ma Ning

5 April 2019 4	Shenzhen F.C.	1–1	Shandong Luneng Taishan	Shenzhen
19:35 CST	Selnæs 49'	Report	Pellè 61'	Stadium: Shenzhen Universiade Sports Centre; Attendance: 20,198; Referee: Wang Zhe

13 April 2019 5	Shenzhen F.C.	0–2	Jiangsu Suning	Shenzhen
19:35 CST		Report	Xie Pengfei 15'; Teixeira 38'	Stadium: Shenzhen Universiade Sports Centre; Attendance: 17,326; Referee: Zhang Lei

20 April 2019 6	Beijing Renhe	2–2	Shenzhen F.C.	Beijing
15:30 CST	Aluko 50'; Makhete Diop 77'	Report	Selnæs 38'; Jin Qiang 88'	Stadium: Fengtai Stadium; Attendance: 7,285; Referee: Shen Yinhao

26 April 2019 7	Guangzhou R&F	3–1	Shenzhen F.C.	Guangzhou
19:35 CST	Zahavi 37', 45', 90+5'	Report	Preciado 17'	Stadium: Yuexiushan Stadium; Attendance: 9,509; Referee: Ma Ning

5 May 2019 8	Shenzhen F.C.	2–1	Shanghai Greenland Shenhua	Shenzhen
19:35 CST	Li Yuanyi 63'; Preciado 88'	Report	Ighalo 76' (pen.)	Stadium: Shenzhen Universiade Sports Centre; Attendance: 12,165; Referee: Milorad Mažić

12 May 2019 9	Beijing Sinobo Guoan	3–0	Shenzhen F.C.	Beijing
19:35 CST	Bakambu 12', 19'; Renato Augusto 62'	Report		Stadium: Workers' Stadium; Attendance: 36,892; Referee: Ma Ning

19 May 2019 10	Shenzhen F.C.	1–2	Dalian Yifang	Shenzhen
19:35 CST	Preciado 24'	Report	Carrasco 77' (pen.); He Yupeng 90'	Stadium: Shenzhen Universiade Sports Centre; Attendance: 16,828; Referee: Petr Ardeleánu

26 May 2019 11	Guangzhou Evergrande Taobao	1–0	Shenzhen F.C.	Guangzhou
17:30 CST	Wei Shihao 56'	Report		Stadium: Tianhe Stadium; Attendance: 46,124; Referee: Mark Clattenburg

1 June 2019 12	Wuhan Zall	2–0	Shenzhen F.C.	Wuhan
19:35 CST	Baptistão 42'; Ming Tian 90+5'	Report		Stadium: Dongxihu Sports Centre; Attendance: 18,137; Referee: Zhang Lei

16 June 2019 13	Shenzhen F.C.	0–0	Tianjin Teda	Shenzhen
19:35 CST	Wang Peng (yellow card) 38'; Gan Chao (yellow card) 42'	Report	Wagner (yellow card) 69'	Stadium: Shenzhen Universiade Sports Centre; Attendance: 10,758; Referee: (China) Ai Kun

22 June 2019 14	Henan Jianye	1–0	Shenzhen F.C.	Zhengzhou
20:35 CST	Ohandza 68'	Report		Stadium: Hanghai Stadium; Attendance: 20,313; Referee: Wang Jing

30 June 2019 15	Shenzhen F.C.	0–1	Shanghai SIPG	Shenzhen
19:35 CST		Report	Oscar 49'	Stadium: Shenzhen Universiade Sports Centre; Attendance: 15,712; Referee: Zhang Lei

7 July 2019 16	Hebei China Fortune	1–1	Shenzhen F.C.	Langfang
19:35 CST	Dong Xuesheng 61'	Report	John Mary 90+3'	Stadium: Langfang Stadium; Attendance: 13,223; Referee: Mark Clattenburg

13 July 2019 17	Tianjin Tianhai	2–2	Shenzhen F.C.	Tianjin
19:35 CST	Renatinho 45'; Yao Junsheng 51'	Report	John Mary 31', 79'	Stadium: Tianjin Olympic Center; Attendance: 16,657; Referee: Ma Ning

17 July 2019 18	Shenzhen F.C.	0–2	Chongqing Dangdai Lifan	Shenzhen
19:35 CST		Report	Kardec 67'; Feng Jing 69'	Stadium: Shenzhen Universiade Sports Centre; Attendance: 12,746; Referee: Ma Li

21 July 2019 19	Shandong Luneng Taishan	3–0	Shenzhen F.C.	Jinan
19:35 CST	Selnæs 16' (o.g.); Fellaini 24'; Pellè 52'	Report		Stadium: Jinan Olympic Sports Center Stadium; Attendance: 18,235; Referee: Huang Yejun

28 July 2019 20	Jiangsu Suning	2–0	Shenzhen F.C.	Nanjing
19:35 CST	Teixeira 7' (pen.), 46'	Report		Stadium: Nanjing Olympic Sports Centre; Attendance: 20,583; Referee: Shen Yinhao

2 August 2019 21	Shenzhen F.C.	1–1	Beijing Renhe	Shenzhen
18:00 CST	John Mary 26'	Report	Zhu Baojie 44'	Stadium: Bao'an Stadium; Attendance: 13,637; Referee: Milorad Mažić

14 August 2019 22	Shenzhen F.C.	4–0	Guangzhou R&F	Shenzhen
20:35 CST	Jin Qiang (yellow card) 33'; Dyego Sousa 45' (pen.) 90+4'; Mary 54' (pen.); Gan Chao (yellow card) 74' (goal) 90'	Report	Eran Zahavi (yellow card) 31'; Jiang Jihong (red card) 43'; Cheng Yuelei (yellow card) 44'; Tošić (yellow card) 69' (yellow-red card) 69'; Li Tixiang (yellow card) 69'	Stadium: Shenzhen Universiade Sports Centre; Attendance: 12,906; Referee: (New Zealand) Matthew Conger

13 September 2019 23	Shenzhen F.C.	1–1	Beijing Sinobo Guoan	Shenzhen
20:35 CST	Dyego Sousa (yellow card) 3'; Gan Chao 15'; Li Yuanyi (yellow card) 21'; Ge Zhen (yellow card) 30'	Report	Chi Zhongguo (yellow card) 3'; Bakambu 74'	Stadium: Shenzhen Universiade Sports Centre; Attendance: 13,263; Referee: (Serbia) Milorad Mažić

21 September 2019 24	Dalian Yifang	2–0	Shenzhen F.C.	Dalian
16:30 CST	Zheng Long 38'; Dong Yanfeng 79'	Report	Yeljan Shinar (yellow card) 78'	Stadium: Dalian Sports Center Stadium; Attendance: 31,949; Referee: (Netherlands) Kevin Blom

26 September 2019 25	Shanghai Greenland Shenhua	2–1	Shenzhen F.C.	Shanghai
20:35 CST	Bi Jinhao (yellow card) 22'; Cao Yunding 26'; Kim Shin-wook 86' (yellow card) 87'; Sun Shilin (yellow card) 90+4'	Report	Dyego Sousa 22' (pen.); Selnæs (red card) 90+4'; Liu Yiming (yellow card) 90+5'	Stadium: Hongkou Football Stadium; Referee: (England) Mark Clattenburg

18 October 2019 26	Shenzhen F.C.	–	Guangzhou Evergrande Taobao	Shenzhen
20:35 CST				Stadium: Shenzhen Universiade Sports Centre

=== Chinese FA Cup ===
==== Fourth round ====
Win Draw Loss Fixtures

1 May 2019	Shenzhen F.C.	0–3; Awarded (Note: CFA awarded Shanghai Greenland Shenhua a 3–0 win as a result of Shenzhen F.C. failing to field three under-23 players in this match. The match was originally ended 0–1.)	Shanghai Greenland Shenhua	Shenzhen
17:30 CST			Moreno 6'	Stadium: Shenzhen Universiade Sports Centre; Attendance: 11,362; Referee: Gu Chunhan
