= 2015 Dalian Aerbin F.C. season =

Dalian Aerbin F.C. Dalian Yifang F.C.
- Chairman: Lü Feng; Shi Xueqing
- Manager: Mikael Stahre
- Stadium: Dalian Sports Center
- League One: 3rd
- FA Cup: 3rd round
- Top goalscorer: Bruno Meneghel (19 goals)
- Highest home attendance: 42,591
- Lowest home attendance: 3,791
- Average home league attendance: 15,233

The 2015 Dalian Aerbin F.C. season was the sixth season in the club's history, and the first season after relegation from the Chinese Super League.

== Background ==
When they were relegated from the Super League, Aerbin sold many starting players trying to minimize their expenses.

Aerbin signed Swedish manager Mikael Stahre before the season started. However, financial issue was still a tough problem for the team. As the performance was below expectation, another back pay was reported to be connected with the team.

On 8 July, Dalian Yifang Group became the major share holder of the club to gain full control of the team, before officially changed the team name to Dalian Yifang F.C.(Chinese: 大连一方足球俱乐部) by the end of the season.

== China League One ==
=== League table ===
| Pos | Team | Pld | W | D | L | GF | GA | GD | Pts | Promotion or relegation |
|---|---|---|---|---|---|---|---|---|---|---|
| 1 | Yanbian Changbaishan (C, P) | 30 | 17 | 10 | 3 | 59 | 24 | +35 | 61 | Promotion to 2016 CSL |
| 2 | Hebei Zhongji (P) | 30 | 18 | 6 | 6 | 53 | 30 | +23 | 60 | Promotion to 2016 CSL |
| 3 | Dalian Aerbin | 30 | 17 | 7 | 6 | 46 | 22 | +24 | 58 | |
| 4 | Beijing Enterprises Group | 30 | 17 | 5 | 8 | 48 | 29 | +19 | 56 | |
| 5 | Harbin Yiteng | 30 | 11 | 14 | 5 | 43 | 31 | +12 | 47 | |

Updated to match(es) played on 1 November 2015. Source: sports.sina.com (in Chinese)
Rules for classification: 1) points; 2) goal difference; 3) number of goals scored; 4) head-to-head goals scored; 5) goal difference; 6) goals scored; 7) disciplinary points (1 point for each yellow card, 3 points for each red card). Head-to-Head: Only used at the end of the season when two or more teams need the head-to-head rules to break a tie.
(C) Champions; (P) Promoted

=== Results summary ===
| Overall | | | | | | | | Home | | | | | | Away | | | | | |
| Pld | W | D | L | GF | GA | GD | Pts | W | D | L | GF | GA | GD | W | D | L | GF | GA | GD |
|---|---|---|---|---|---|---|---|---|---|---|---|---|---|---|---|---|---|---|---|
| 30 | 17 | 7 | 6 | 46 | 32 | +14 | 58 | 10 | 4 | 1 | 28 | 8 | +20 | 7 | 3 | 5 | 18 | 24 | −6 |

Last updated: 1 November 2016.
Source: See Results

=== Positions by round ===
| Team ╲ Round | 1 | 2 | 3 | 4 | 5 | 6 | 7 | 8 | 9 | 10 | 11 | 12 | 13 | 14 | 15 | 16 | 17 | 18 | 19 | 20 | 21 | 22 | 23 | 24 | 25 | 26 | 27 | 28 | 29 | 30 |
|---|---|---|---|---|---|---|---|---|---|---|---|---|---|---|---|---|---|---|---|---|---|---|---|---|---|---|---|---|---|---|
| Dalian Aerbin | 1 | 1 | 1 | 1 | 1 | 1 | 1 | 1 | 1 | 1 | 1 | 3 | 3 | 4 | 4 | 4 | 6 | 6 | 6 | 6 | 4 | 4 | 4 | 2 | 2 | 3 | 3 | 3 | 3 | 3 |

| Winner; promote to Chinese Super League |
| Runner-up; promote to Chinese Super League |
| Relegate to China League Two |

=== League fixtures and results ===
| 14 March 2015 1 | Dalian Aerbin | 4 – 0 | Xinjiang Tianshan Leopard | Dalian |
| Saturday 14:30 | Mathias Ranégie 9'; Yan Zhiyu 28' (o); Bruno Meneghel 39'; Han Xuegeng (yellow card) 71'; Sun Guowen 85' | | Cai Xi (yellow card) 14'; Arapat (yellow card) 47' | Stadium: Dalian Sports Center; Attendance: 3,791; Referee: Xing Qi |

| 21 March 2015 2 | Dalian Aerbin | 1 – 0 | Beijing BG | Dalian |
| Saturday 14:30 | Chen Tao (yellow card) 20'; Jin Qiang (yellow card) 31'; Bruno Meneghel 78' | | Danko Lazović (yellow card) 40'; Éder Lima (yellow card) 90+3' | Stadium: Dalian Sports Center; Attendance: 5,568; Referee: Wang Jin |

| 4 April 2015 3 | Wuhan Zall | 1 – 1 | Dalian Aerbin | Wuhan |
| Saturday 15:30 | Mathias Ranégie 7'; Yue Xin 41' | | Ransford Addo (yellow card) 58'; Luo Yi (yellow card) 65'; Brice Jovial 76' (yellow card) 90+3' | Stadium: Wuhan Sports Center Stadium; Attendance: 4,611; Referee: Shi Zhenlu |

| 11 April 2015 4 | Dalian Aerbin | 2 – 0 | Hunan Billows | Dalian |
| Saturday 15:30 | Mathias Ranégie 32'; Eddy Francis (yellow card) 54'; Niklas Backman 59'; Jin Qiang (yellow card) 65' | | Liu Yusheng (yellow card) 26'; Cao Huan (yellow card) 58' | Stadium: Dalian Sports Center; Attendance: 5,125; Referee: Shen Yinhao |

| 19 April 2015 5 | Qingdao Jonoon | 0 – 0 | Dalian Aerbin | Qingdao |
| Sunday 15:30 | | | | Stadium: Qingdao Tiantai Stadium; Attendance: 3,523; Referee: Chen Xin |

| 25 April 2015 6 | Dalian Aerbin | 2 – 0 | Jiangxi Liansheng | Dalian |
| Saturday 19:00 | Bruno Meneghel 14', 50' (yellow card) 77'; Wang Wanpeng (yellow card) 64'; Sun Bo (red card) 64' | | Wu Fei (yellow card) 64'; Wang Jianwen (yellow card) 66' | Stadium: Dalian Sports Center; Attendance: 5,101; Referee: Tang Kun |

| 2 May 2015 7 | Hebei Zhongji | 2 – 0 | Dalian Aerbin | Qinhuangdao |
| Saturday 15:00 | Nenad Milijaš 8', 46'; Du Wei (yellow card) 39'; Ibba Laajab (yellow card) 83' | | Zhu Xiaogang (yellow card) 44'; Zhu Ting (yellow card) 84'; Chen Tao (red card) 90' | Stadium: Qinhuangdao Olympic Sports Center Stadium; Attendance: 5,232; Referee: Yang Kaizi |

| 9 May 2015 8 | Dalian Aerbin | 3 – 3 | Guizhou Zhicheng | Dalian |
| Saturday 19:00 | Bruno Meneghel 10', 90'; Eddy Francis (yellow card) 61' (red card) 91+3'; Niklas Backman 90+3' | | Hermann Ekwalla 55', 81', 83'; Xia Jin (yellow card) 10'; Rodrigo Paulista (yellow card) 61'; Jiang Liang (yellow card) 72' | Stadium: Dalian Sports Center; Attendance: 3,898; Referee: Jin Jun |

| 16 May 2015 9 | Shenzhen F.C. | 1 – 3 | Dalian Aerbin | Shenzhen |
| Saturday 19:30 | Babacar Gueye 54' | | Mathias Ranégie 36' (yellow card) 77'; Wang Jinxian 39'; Bruno Meneghel 68' (yellow card) 69'; Yue Xin (yellow card) 82' | Stadium: Shenzhen Stadium; Attendance: 10,211; Referee: Chen Xin |

| 23 May 2015 10 | Dalian Aerbin | 4 – 1 | Beijing BIT | Dalian |
| Saturday 19:00 | Mathias Ranégie 4', 48'; Sun Guowen 42'; Bruno Meneghel (yellow card) 44' (goal) 89'; Jin Qiang (yellow card) 62' | | He Zichao (yellow card) 51'; Han Guanghui 56' (yellow card) 68' | Stadium: Dalian Sports Center; Attendance: 5,218; Referee: Xing Qi |

| 30 May 2015 11 | Yanbian Changbaishan | 2 – 0 | Dalian Aerbin | Yanji |
| Saturday 15:00 | Zhao Ming (yellow card) 20'; Jaílton Paraíba (yellow card) 44'; Ha Tae-Kyun 57'; Li Xun (yellow card) 60'; Jin Bo 87' | | Eddy Francis (yellow card) 6'; Ranégie (yellow card) 45+2' | Stadium: Yanji New Stadium; Attendance: 20,266; Referee: Xia Jun |

| 6 June 2015 12 | Dalian Aerbin | 2 – 2 | Harbin Yiteng | Dalian |
| Saturday 19:00 | Bruno 43'; Ranégie 72' (yellow card) 72' | | Li Xiaoting 9'; Wang Dalong 67' (yellow card) 80' | Stadium: Dalian Sports Center; Attendance: 10,201; Referee: Chen Gang |

| 14 June 2015 13 | Qingdao Hainiu | 0 – 2 | Dalian Aerbin | Qingdao |
| Sunday 19:00 | Liu Xiaofeng (yellow card) 57' | | Bruno 58'; Cui Ming'an 81'; Zhu Ting (yellow card) 78'; Ranégie (red card) 85' | Stadium: Guoxin Stadium; Attendance: 5,121; Referee: Jin Jingyuan |

| 20 June 2015 14 | Dalian Aerbin | 0 – 1 | Nei Mongol Zhongyou | Dalian |
| Saturday 19:00 | Zhu Xiaogang (yellow card) 15'; Chen Tao (yellow card) 67'; Bruno (yellow card) 74' | | Zhang Tianxiang (yellow card) 2'; Wang Yunlong (yellow card) 36'; Dori 44' (yellow card) 86'; Yin Lu (yellow card) 62'; Mao Kaiyu (yellow card) 83'; Han Fangteng (yellow card) 90+2' | Stadium: Dalian Sports Center; Attendance: 6,158; Referee: Ma Ye |

| 27 June 2015 15 | Tianjin Songjiang | 2 – 1 | Dalian Aerbin | Tianjin |
| Saturday 17:00 | Mário Lúcio 3' (pen.); Frank Nouble 40'; Xia Ningning (yellow card) 72' | | Bruno 22'; Zou You (yellow card) 35'; Jin Qiang (yellow card) 43' | Stadium: Tuanbo Stadium; Attendance: 1,838; Referee: Qiu Zhaojun |

| 4 July 2015 16 | Xinjiang Tianshan Leopard | 3 – 1 | Dalian Aerbin | Urumqi |
| Saturday 18:30 | Cristian Dănălache 39'; Dong Zhiyuan 63', 76'; Qi Yunfei (yellow card) 90+5' | | Bruno Meneghel (yellow card) 28', (goal) 36'; Eddy Francis (yellow card) 83' | Stadium: Xinjiang Sports Center Stadium; Attendance: 2,114; Referee: Jin Jingyuan |

| 11 July 2015 17 | Beijing BG | 1 – 0 | Dalian Aerbin | Beijing |
| Saturday 19:30 | Carmelo Valencia 41'; Godfred Karikari (yellow card) 90' | | Jin Qiang (yellow card) 52' | Stadium: Olympic Sports Centre (Beijing); Attendance: 5,068; Referee: Wng Jing |

| 18 July 2015 18 | Dalian Aerbin | 0 – 0 | Wuhan Zall | Dalian |
| Saturday 19:30 | Jin Qiang (yellow card) 60' | | Kang Zhenjie (yellow card) 7' | Stadium: Dalian Sports Center; Attendance: 17,202; Referee: Xu Hang |

| 25 July 2015 19 | Hunan Billows | 0 – 1 | Dalian Aerbin | Changsha |
| Saturday 19:00 | Yang Ke (yellow card) 90+3' | | Zhu Xiaogang (yellow card) 41'; Jin Qiang 61'; Zhu Ting (yellow card) 85' | Stadium: Helong Stadium; Attendance: 2,125; Referee: Wangjing |

| 2 August 2015 20 | Dalian Aerbin | 2 – 0 | Qingdao Jonoon | Dalian |
| Sunday 19:00 | Eddy Francis (yellow card) 64'; Wang Jinxian 78'; Cui Ming'an 90+2' | | Quan Lei (yellow card) 4'; Sun Xu (yellow card) 35' | Stadium: Dalian Sports Center; Attendance: 22,111; Referee: Wu Liying |

| 9 August 2015 21 | Jiangxi Liansheng | 0 – 2 | Dalian Aerbin | Jiujiang |
| Sunday 19:35 | Ren Xin (yellow card) 45' | | Bruno Meneghel 10'; Zhu Xiaogang (yellow card) 18'; Mathias Ranégie 36' (pen.); Cui Ming'an (yellow card) 54'; Jin Qiang (yellow card) 69' | Stadium: Jiujiang Sports Center; Attendance: 13,228; Referee: Gu Chunhan |

| 15 August 2015 22 | Dalian Aerbin | 1 – 0 | Hebei Zhongji | Dalian |
| Saturday 19:00 | Wang Wanpeng (yellow card) 56'; Mathias Ranégie 89' | | Du Wei (yellow card) 26'; Luo Senwen (yellow card) 26'; Du Wenyang (yellow card) 87' | Stadium: Dalian Sports Center; Attendance: 31,158; Referee: Chen Gang |

| 22 August 2015 23 | Guizhou Zhicheng | 0 – 1 | Dalian Aerbin | Guiyang |
| Saturday 16:00 | Lin Longchang (yellow card) 38'; Huang Zhun (yellow card) 71' | | Bruno Meneghel 43', (yellow card) 69'; Mathias Ranégie (yellow card) 71' | Stadium: Guiyang Olympic Sports Center; Attendance: 1,231; Referee: Yang Kaizi |

| 29 August 2015 24 | Dalian Aerbin | 1 – 0 | Shenzhen F.C. | Dalian |
| Saturday 19:00 | Sun Guowen (yellow card) 50', (goal) 80' | | Huang Long (yellow card) 12'; Cai Jingyuan (yellow card) 31'; Du Longquan (yellow card) 70'; Li Fei (yellow card) 87' | Stadium: Dalian Sports Center; Attendance: 30,791; Referee: Guo Hao |

| 12 September 2015 25 | Beijing BIT | 0 – 3 | Dalian Aerbin | Beijing |
| Saturday 15:00 | | | Bruno Meneghel 19', 48', 89' | Stadium: BIT Eastern Athletic Field; Attendance: 1,683; Referee: Tang Kun |

| 19 September 2015 26 | Dalian Aerbin | 1 – 1 | Yanbian Changbaishan | Dalian |
| Saturday 19:00 | Wang Wanpeng 22'; Cui Ming'an (yellow card) 46'; Jin Qiang (yellow card) 71'; Bruno Meneghel (yellow card) 81' | | Ha Tae-kyun 18'; Pei Yuwen (yellow card) 23'; Chen Xiao (yellow card) 38'; Wu Yongchun (yellow card) 68' | Stadium: Dalian Sports Center; Attendance: 42,591; Referee: Ai Kun |

| 26 September 2015 27 | Harbin Yiteng | 2 – 2 | Dalian Aerbin | Harbin |
| Saturday 15:00 | Juan Gilberto Núñez 39'; Adam Hughes (yellow card) 90+1', (goal) 90+3' | | Sun Bo (yellow card) 42'; Niklas Backman (yellow card) 49'; Sun Guowen 74', 77' | Stadium: Harbin International Exhibition Center Stadium; Attendance: 16,875; Referee: Dong Kun |

| 17 October 2015 28 | Dalian Aerbin | 3 – 0 | Qingdao Hainiu | Dalian |
| Saturday 19:00 | Mathias Ranégie 15', (yellow card) 33'; Wang Wanpeng (yellow card) 40'; Bruno Meneghel 54'; Sun Guowen 81'; Wang Jinxian (yellow card) 90' | | Đorđe Rakić (yellow card) 74' | Stadium: Dalian Sports Center; Attendance: 23,591; Referee: Dong Kun |

| 24 October 2015 29 | Nei Mongol Zhongyou | 0 – 1 | Dalian Aerbin | Hohhot |
| Saturday 14:00 | Jonas Salley (yellow card) 5'; Mao Kaiyu (yellow card) 53'; Han Fangteng (yellow card) 71'; Dorielton (yellow card) 85'; Zhao Zuojun (yellow card) 90+2' | | Mathias Ranégie (yellow card) 31', (goal) 43'; Niklas Backman (yellow card) 76' | Stadium: Hohhot City Stadium; Attendance: 15,268; Referee: Guo Baolong |

| 1 November 2015 30 | Dalian Aerbin | 2 – 0 | Tianjin Songjiang | Dalian |
| Sunday 14:00 | Niklas Backman 66'; Bruno Meneghel 90+3' | | Juan Bolaños (yellow card) 26'; Frank Nouble (yellow card) 36'; Wan Cheng (yellow card) 40'; Mário Lúcio (yellow card) 79' (yellow-red card) 81' | Stadium: Dalian Sports Center; Attendance: 15,993; Referee: Dai Yige |

== Chinese FA Cup ==
=== Cup fixtures and results ===
| 16 April 2015 2 | Hangzhou Ange | 0 – 2 | Dalian Aerbin | Hangzhou |
| 15:30 CST | | | Wang Jinxian 2'; Du Yuxin 50' | Stadium: Jianggan Sports Center; Attendance: 1,216; Referee: Ma Ye |

| 13 May 2015 3 | Dalian Aerbin | 1 – 2 | Chongqing Lifan | Dalian |
| 19:00 CST | Zhao Xuebin 42' | | Cheng Mouyi 50'; Lü Haidong 60' | Stadium: Dalian Sports Center; Attendance: 1,502; Referee: Shi Zhenlu |

== Player information ==
=== Transfers ===
==== In ====
| No. | Pos. | Name | Age | Moving from | Type | Transfer Window | Transfer fee | Notes | Ref. |
|---|---|---|---|---|---|---|---|---|---|
| 2 | DF | (China) Wang Wanpeng | 32 | (China) Changchun Yatai | Transfer | Winter | €420,000 | — | |
| 11 | FW | (Sweden) Mathias Ranégie | 30 | (England) Watford | Loan | Winter | — | — | |
| 20 | DF | (China) Du Yuxin | 22 | (China) Shandong Luneng Reserves | Transfer | Winter | — | — | |
| 19 | GK | (China) Yu Ziqian | 29 | (China) Qingdao Hainiu | Transfer | Winter | — | — | |
| 5 | DF | (China) Zou You | 29 | (China) Chengdu Tiancheng | Transfer | Winter | — | — | |
| 8 | DF | (China) Zhu Ting | 29 | (China) Wuhan Zall | Transfer | Winter | — | — | |

==== Out ====
| No. | Pos. | Name | Age | Moving to | Type | Transfer Window | Transfer fee | Notes | Ref. |
|---|---|---|---|---|---|---|---|---|---|
| 22 | FW | (China) Yu Dabao | 26 | (China) Beijing Guoan | Transfer | Winter | €4.2M | — | |
| 39 | MF | (China) Zhang Jiaqi | 23 | (China) Guangzhou Evergrande | Transfer | Winter | €2.8M | — | |
| 8 | MF | (China) Lü Peng | 25 | (China) Beijing BG | Transfer | Winter | €1.7M | — | |
| 5 | DF | (China) Jin Pengxiang | 25 | (China) Beijing Guoan | Transfer | Winter | €1.4M | — | |
| 7 | DF | (China) Zhao Honglüe | 25 | (China) Tianjin TEDA | Transfer | Winter | €1.13M | — | |
| | DF | (China) Jin Yangyang | 21 | (China) Guangzhou R&F | Transfer | Winter | €1.1M | — | |
| 2 | DF | (China) Yang Boyu | 25 | (China) Shanghai SIPG | Transfer | Winter | €915,000 | — | |
| 17 | MF | (China) Quan Heng | 25 | (China) Dalian Transcendence | Transfer | Winter | — | — | |
| 16 | FW | (China) Nan Yunqi | 21 | (China) Dalian Transcendence | Loan | Winter | — | — | |
| 24 | DF | (China) Ji Zhengyu | 20 | (China) Dalian Transcendence | Loan | Winter | — | — | |
| 35 | FW | (Argentina) Esteban Solari | 34 | (Greece) Ergotelis | Transfer | Winter | — | — | |

=== Squad ===
As of 17 March 2015

Note: Flags indicate national team as defined under FIFA eligibility rules; some limited exceptions apply. Players may hold more than one non-FIFA nationality.

| No. | Pos. | Nation | Player |
|---|---|---|---|
| 1 | GK | CHN | Zhang Chong |
| 2 | DF | CHN | Wang Wanpeng |
| 3 | DF | SWE | Niklas Backman |
| 5 | DF | CHN | Zou You |
| 6 | MF | CHN | Zhu Xiaogang |
| 8 | MF | CHN | Zhu Ting |
| 9 | FW | SWE | Mathias Ranégie |
| 10 | MF | CHN | Chen Tao |
| 11 | FW | BRA | Bruno Meneghel |
| 12 | FW | CHN | Zhao Xuebin |
| 13 | GK | CHN | Liu Weiguo |
| 15 | MF | CHN | Jin Qiang |
| 17 | MF | CHN | Zhang Hui |
| 18 | FW | CHN | Wang Jinxian |
| 19 | GK | CHN | Yu Ziqian |

| No. | Pos. | Nation | Player |
|---|---|---|---|
| 20 | DF | CHN | Du Yuxin |
| 21 | DF | CHN | Liu Yingchen |
| 22 | MF | CHN | Duan Yunzi |
| 23 | GK | CHN | Chen Junlin |
| 25 | DF | CHN | Wang Qianshuo |
| 26 | MF | CHN | Cui Ming'an |
| 27 | DF | CHN | Shan Pengfei |
| 21 | DF | CHN | Yue Xin |
| 29 | MF | CHN | Sun Bo |
| 30 | DF | CHN | Han Xuegeng |
| 31 | DF | CHN | Wang Yaopeng |
| 32 | DF | CHN | Eddy Francis |
| 33 | MF | CHN | Sun Guowen |
