= List of Chinese football transfers summer 2015 =

This is a list of Chinese football transfers for the 2015 season summer transfer window. The transfer window opened on 22 June 2015 and closed on 16 July 2015.

== Super League ==
=== Beijing Guoan ===
In:

No.	Pos.	Nation	Player
7	FW	CHN	Zhang Chiming (from Chongqing Lifan)
27	MF	CHN	Zhang Xizhe (from (Germany) VfL Wolfsburg)
33	FW	BRA	Kléber (from (Portugal) FC Porto)

Out:

No.	Pos.	Nation	Player
6	MF	CHN	Zhang Xiaobin (loan to Chongqing Lifan)
28	DF	CHN	Zhang Chengdong (loan to (Spain) Rayo Vallecano)
34	MF	CHN	Ba Dun (loan to Meizhou Kejia)

=== Changchun Yatai ===
In:

No.	Pos.	Nation	Player

Out:

No.	Pos.	Nation	Player
-	DF	CHN	He Zitong (loan to Baotou Nanjiao)
-	FW	CHN	Wang Si (loan to Guangxi Longguida)

=== Chongqing Lifan ===
In:

No.	Pos.	Nation	Player
13	MF	CHN	Zhang Xiaobin (loan from Beijing Guoan)
24	FW	BRA	Jael Ferreira (from (Brazil) Joinville Esporte Clube)
32	FW	BRA	Fernandinho (loan from (Portugal) G.D. Estoril Praia)
33	FW	ARG	Emanuel Gigliotti (from (Argentina) Boca Juniors)

Out:

No.	Pos.	Nation	Player
7	FW	CHN	Zhang Chiming (to Beijing Guoan)
10	FW	BRA	Jajá (to (Belgium) Lokeren)
33	FW	ARG	Emanuel Gigliotti (loan return to (Argentina) Boca Juniors)
45	DF	CHN	Fang Jianyu (loan to Tianjin Huochetou)

=== Guangzhou Evergrande Taobao ===
In:

No.	Pos.	Nation	Player
14	GK	CHN	Liu Weiguo (from Dalian Aerbin)
48	MF	BRA	Paulinho (from (England) Tottenham Hotspur)
56	FW	BRA	Robinho (from (Italy) A.C. Milan)
57	DF	CHN	Chen Zepeng (from Guangzhou R&F)
-	MF	CHN	Li Yuanyi (from (Portugal) Boavista)
-	MF	ITA	Alessandro Diamanti (loan return from (Italy) Fiorentina)
-	FW	ITA	Alberto Gilardino (loan return from (Italy) Fiorentina)

Out:

No.	Pos.	Nation	Player
15	DF	CHN	Yi Teng (loan to Hangzhou Greentown)
-	MF	CHN	Li Yuanyi (loan to (Portugal) Leixões)
-	MF	ITA	Alessandro Diamanti (loan to (England) Watford)
-	FW	ITA	Alberto Gilardino (to (Italy) Palermo)

=== Guangzhou R&F ===
In:

No.	Pos.	Nation	Player
22	FW	COD	Jeremy Bokila (from (Russia) Terek Grozny)
31	MF	BRA	Renato (from (Japan) Kawasaki Frontale)
34	MF	CHN	Wang Jia'nan (Free Agent)
39	MF	CHN	Huang Haoxuan (Free Agent)

Out:

No.	Pos.	Nation	Player
8	MF	KOR	Park Jong-Woo (to (United Arab Emirates) Al Jazira Club)
9	FW	MAR	Abderazak Hamdallah (to (Qatar) El Jaish SC)
29	FW	CHN	Zhang Shuo (loan to Tianjin Songjiang)
32	DF	CHN	Chen Zepeng (to Guangzhou Evergrande)
54	MF	CHN	Pan Jiajun (loan to Meixian Hakka)
-	MF	CHN	Li Lingwei (to Baoding Yingli ETS)

=== Guizhou Renhe ===
In:

No.	Pos.	Nation	Player
9	MF	BIH	Zvjezdan Misimović (Free Agent)
21	MF	BIH	Sejad Salihović (from (Germany) 1899 Hoffenheim)
22	FW	CHN	Wang Gang (from (Portugal) S.G. Sacavenense)
28	MF	CHN	Zhang Yuxuan (loan return from Nei Mongol Zhongyou)
50	MF	CHN	Li Chenglong (from Hangzhou Greentown)
-	MF	CHN	Li Shuai (loan return from Yinchuan Helanshan)

Out:

No.	Pos.	Nation	Player
7	MF	POL	Krzysztof Mączyński (to (Poland) Wisła Kraków)
10	FW	SWE	Magnus Eriksson (to (Denmark) Brøndby IF)
-	MF	CHN	Li Shuai (loan to Nei Mongol Zhongyou)

=== Hangzhou Greentown ===
In:

No.	Pos.	Nation	Player
5	DF	CHN	Yi Teng (loan from Guangzhou Evergrande)
7	FW	TUN	Imed Louati (from (Tunisia) CS Sfaxien)
29	MF	CHN	Yue Xin (from Dalian Aerbin)
31	MF	SRB	Miloš Bosančić (from (Serbia) Red Star Belgrade)
34	DF	AUS	Matthew Spiranovic (from (Australia) Western Sydney Wanderers)
35	MF	CHN	Wang Jiayu (loan from Shanghai SIPG)
59	MF	CHN	Wu Qingsong (from Yanbian Changbaishan)
-	GK	CHN	Yu Yongzhe (Free Agent)
-	FW	BRA	Gilberto Macena (loan return from (Thailand) Buriram United)

Out:

No.	Pos.	Nation	Player
7	FW	TUN	Imed Louati (loan to (South Korea) Gyeongnam FC)
15	MF	CHN	Cheng Jin (loan to Wuhan Zall)
29	MF	CHN	Yue Xin (loan to Wuhan Zall)
30	FW	CHN	Zhang Yuning (to (Netherlands) Vitesse Arnhem)
37	MF	CHN	Shen Jin (loan to Anhui Litian)
39	MF	CHN	Wei Zhaokun (loan to Anhui Litian)
46	MF	CHN	Li Chenglong (to Guizhou Renhe)
-	GK	CHN	Yu Yongzhe (loan to Jiangxi Liansheng)
-	FW	BRA	Gilberto Macena (to (Thailand) Buriram United)

=== Henan Jianye ===
In:

No.	Pos.	Nation	Player
2	DF	CHN	Long Cheng (from Wuhan Zall)
35	MF	CHN	Liang Yu (from Shanghai Shenhua)

Out:

No.	Pos.	Nation	Player
28	DF	CHN	Tang Dechao (to Meizhou Kejia)
48	DF	CHN	Ding Guoliang (to Shenzhen FC)

=== Jiangsu Guoxin Sainty ===
In:

No.	Pos.	Nation	Player
31	DF	ROU	Marius Constantin (loan from (Romania) ASA Târgu Mureș)
39	MF	CHN	Liu Wei (Free Agent)

Out:

No.	Pos.	Nation	Player

=== Liaoning Whowin ===
In:

No.	Pos.	Nation	Player
13	MF	ROU	Eric Bicfalvi (from (Ukraine) FC Volyn Lutsk)
14	FW	BRA	Paulo Henrique (loan from Shanghai Shenhua)
22	MF	CHN	Wang Liang (Free Agent)

Out:

No.	Pos.	Nation	Player
28	DF	AUS	Josh Mitchell (Released)
31	DF	HKG	Fofo (Released)

=== Shandong Luneng Taishan ===
In:

No.	Pos.	Nation	Player
4	MF	BRA	Jucilei (from (United Arab Emirates) Al Jazira Club)
33	DF	CHN	Gao Zhunyi (from (Japan) Avispa Fukuoka)

Out:

No.	Pos.	Nation	Player

=== Shanghai Greenland Shenhua ===
In:

No.	Pos.	Nation	Player
9	FW	SEN	Demba Ba (from (Turkey) Besiktas J.K.)
14	MF	MLI	Mohamed Sissoko (from (Spain) Levante UD)
31	FW	CHN	Xu Junmin (loan return from (Spain) CF Crack's)
33	MF	CHN	Xu Jun (loan return from (Spain) CF Crack's)
34	GK	CHN	Shen Jun (loan return from (Spain) CF Crack's)
51	FW	CHN	Gao Shipeng (loan return from (Spain) CF Crack's)
54	DF	HKG	Brian Fok (loan return from (Spain) CF Crack's)
55	DF	CHN	Li Xiaoming (loan return from (Spain) CF Crack's)
56	DF	CHN	Xu Yougang (loan return from (Spain) CF Crack's)
57	DF	CHN	Cao Chuanyu (loan return from (Spain) CF Crack's)
58	MF	CHN	Chen Tao (loan return from (Spain) CF Crack's)
-	DF	CHN	Huang Bowen (loan return from (Spain) CF Crack's)
-	DF	CHN	Leng Shiao (loan return from (Spain) CF Crack's)
-	MF	CHN	Yan Xinyu (loan return from (Spain) CF Crack's)
-	FW	CHN	Zhou Jiahao (loan return from (Spain) CF Crack's)
-	MF	CHN	Lü Pin (loan return from (Spain) CF Crack's)
-	MF	CHN	Chen Qiyuan (loan return from (Spain) CF Crack's)
-	GK	CHN	Zhu Yueqi (loan return from (Spain) CF Crack's)
-	DF	CHN	Deng Biao (loan return from (Spain) CF Crack's)
-	DF	CHN	Gong Jinshuai (loan return from (Spain) CF Crack's)
-	MF	CHN	Pan Weihao (loan return from (Spain) CF Crack's)
-	MF	CHN	Zu Pengchao (loan return from (Spain) CF Crack's)

Out:

No.	Pos.	Nation	Player
7	MF	CHN	Wang Changqing (to Beijing BG)
12	FW	BRA	Paulo Henrique (loan to Liaoning Whowin)
13	DF	ZAM	Stoppila Sunzu (loan to (France) Lille OSC)
16	MF	CHN	Wang Fei (loan to Nei Mongol Zhongyou)
25	MF	CHN	Su Shun (loan to (Spain) Atlético Museros)
26	MF	CHN	Liang Yu (to Henan Jianye)
27	MF	CHN	Liu Jiawei (loan to (Spain) Atlético Museros)
32	FW	CHN	Wu Changqi (loan to (Spain) Atlético Museros)
35	GK	CHN	Bai Shuo (loan to (Spain) Atlético Museros)
38	MF	CHN	Zhang Yuhao (loan to (Spain) Atlético Museros)
46	MF	CHN	Li Lianxiang (loan to (Spain) Atlético Museros)
38	MF	CHN	Zhang Yuhao (loan to (Spain) Atlético Museros)
46	MF	CHN	Li Lianxiang (loan to (Spain) Atlético Museros)
-	DF	CHN	Huang Bowen (loan to (Spain) Atlético Museros)
-	DF	CHN	Leng Shiao (loan to (Spain) Atlético Museros)
-	MF	CHN	Yan Xinyu (loan to (Spain) Atlético Museros)
-	FW	CHN	Zhou Jiahao (loan to (Spain) Atlético Museros)
-	MF	CHN	Lü Pin (loan to (Spain) Atlético Museros)
-	MF	CHN	Chen Qiyuan (loan to (Spain) Atlético Museros)
-	GK	CHN	Zhu Yueqi (loan to (Spain) Atlético Museros)
-	DF	CHN	Deng Biao (loan to (Spain) Atlético Museros)
-	DF	CHN	Gong Jinshuai (loan to (Spain) Atlético Museros)
-	MF	CHN	Pan Weihao (loan to (Spain) Atlético Museros)
-	MF	CHN	Chen Xiaomao (loan to (Spain) Atlético Museros)
-	FW	CHN	Zhou Jiahao (loan to (Spain) Atlético Museros)

=== Shanghai Shenxin ===
In:

No.	Pos.	Nation	Player
33	MF	CRC	Michael Barrantes (from (Norway) Aalesunds FK)

Out:

No.	Pos.	Nation	Player
4	MF	CHN	Liao Chengjian (loan to Anhui Litian)
10	FW	BRA	Zé Eduardo (to (Brazil) Goiás)
17	MF	KOR	Lim You-Hwan (to (Japan) Albirex Niigata)
37	MF	CHN	Tan Fucheng (loan to Anhui Litian)

=== Shanghai SIPG ===
In:

No.	Pos.	Nation	Player
35	FW	GHA	Asamoah Gyan (from (United Arab Emirates) Al-Ain FC)
47	MF	CHN	Zhu Zhengyu (Free Agent)
50	DF	CHN	Yang Fan (from Nei Mongol Zhongyou)
-	FW	AUS	Bernie Ibini-Isei (loan return from (Australia) Sydney FC)

Out:

No.	Pos.	Nation	Player
13	MF	CHN	Zheng Dalun (loan to Tianjin Songjiang)
20	MF	CHN	Wang Jiayu (loan to Hangzhou Greentown)
-	FW	AUS	Bernie Ibini-Isei (to (Belgium) Club Brugge KV)

=== Shijiazhuang Ever Bright ===
In:

No.	Pos.	Nation	Player
10	MF	POR	Rúben Micael (from (Portugal) S.C. Braga)
24	FW	ISL	Eiður Guðjohnsen (from (England) Bolton Wanderers)

Out:

No.	Pos.	Nation	Player
33	MF	CHN	Guo Song (loan to (Portugal) GD União Torcatense)

=== Tianjin TEDA ===
In:

No.	Pos.	Nation	Player
31	MF	ROU	Cristian Tănase (from (Romania) FC Steaua București)
32	MF	BRA	Wágner (from (Brazil) Fluminense FC)
33	MF	CHN	Zhou Tong (from Dalian Aerbin)
37	MF	CHN	Ma Leilei (Free Agent)

Out:

No.	Pos.	Nation	Player
5	DF	CHN	Li Weifeng (Released)
11	MF	BRA	Andrezinho (to (Brazil) Vasco da Gama)
24	FW	COL	Wilmar Jordán (loan to (United Arab Emirates) Emirates Club)
48	FW	CHN	Du Junpeng (to Baoding Yingli ETS)

== League One ==
=== Beijing BG ===
In:

No.	Pos.	Nation	Player
4	DF	MNE	Nikola Vujadinović (from (Spain) CA Osasuna)
6	MF	CHN	Wang Changqing (from Shanghai Shenhua)

Out:

No.	Pos.	Nation	Player
3	DF	BRA	Éder Lima (to (Brazil) Bragantino)

=== Beijing BIT ===
In:

No.	Pos.	Nation	Player
31	FW	URU	Maureen Franco (from (Uruguay) Sud América)

Out:

No.	Pos.	Nation	Player
8	MF	URU	Julio Gutiérrez (loan to Qingdao Hainiu)

=== Dalian Aerbin ===
In:

No.	Pos.	Nation	Player
-	DF	CHN	Ji Zhengyu (loan return from Dalian Transcendence)

Out:

No.	Pos.	Nation	Player
13	GK	CHN	Liu Weiguo (to Guangzhou Evergrande)
28	MF	CHN	Yue Xin (to Hangzhou Greentown)
55	MF	CHN	Zhang Zheng (to Qingdao Hainiu)
56	MF	CHN	Zhou Tong (to Tianjin Teda)
-	DF	CHN	Ji Zhengyu (loan to Hunan Billows)

=== Guizhou Zhicheng ===
In:

No.	Pos.	Nation	Player
7	MF	CHN	Wang Fan (Free Agent)

Out:

No.	Pos.	Nation	Player

=== Harbin Yiteng ===
In:

No.	Pos.	Nation	Player
33	FW	COL	Juan Núñez (from (Mexico) Altamira)
35	FW	CHN	Yang Zi (Free Agent)

Out:

No.	Pos.	Nation	Player
44	MF	CHN	Yang Xinxin (to Shenzhen Ruby)

=== Hebei Zhongji ===
In:

No.	Pos.	Nation	Player
7	FW	BRA	Edu (from (South Korea) Jeonbuk Hyundai)
26	FW	CHN	Tan Yang (loan from (Portugal) S.C. Farense)

Out:

No.	Pos.	Nation	Player

=== Hunan Billows ===
In:

No.	Pos.	Nation	Player
2	DF	CHN	Ji Zhengyu (loan from Dalian Aerbin)
41	MF	CHN	Wang Haozhi (Free Agent)

Out:

No.	Pos.	Nation	Player

=== Jiangxi Liansheng ===
In:

No.	Pos.	Nation	Player
22	GK	CHN	Yu Yongzhe (loan from Hangzhou Greentown)
27	FW	BRA	Léo Itaperuna (loan from (Switzerland) FC Sion)

Out:

No.	Pos.	Nation	Player

=== Nei Mongol Zhongyou ===
In:

No.	Pos.	Nation	Player
21	MF	CHN	Li Shuai (loan from Guizhou Renhe)
26	MF	CHN	Wang Fei (loan from Shanghai Shenhua)

Out:

No.	Pos.	Nation	Player
11	MF	CHN	Zhang Xingbo (loan to Meixian Hakka)
24	MF	CHN	Zhang Yuxuan (loan return to Guizhou Renhe)
33	MF	CHN	Di You (to Baoding Yingli ETS)
43	DF	CHN	Yang Fan (to Shanghai SIPG)

=== Qingdao Hainiu ===
In:

No.	Pos.	Nation	Player
32	MF	URU	Julio Gutiérrez (loan from Beijing BIT)
61	FW	CHN	Du Jinlong (Free Agent)
62	GK	CHN	Li Ya'nan (Free Agent)
65	MF	CHN	Deng Yunong (Free Agent)
66	MF	CHN	Zhang Zheng (from Dalian Aerbin)
67	MF	CHN	Jin Chengjun (Free Agent)
68	DF	CHN	Li Jiahao (Free Agent)
69	MF	CHN	Lu Chenghe (Free Agent)
70	DF	CHN	Wang Xudong (Free Agent)

Out:

No.	Pos.	Nation	Player
8	MF	SRB	Goran Gogić (Deceased)

=== Qingdao Jonoon ===
In:

No.	Pos.	Nation	Player
14	MF	BRA	Rogerinho (from (Brazil) Paysandu Sport Club)

Out:

No.	Pos.	Nation	Player
20	MF	HON	Jorge Claros (Released)
-	MF	CHN	Pan Yuchen (loan to Anhui Litian)

=== Shenzhen F.C. ===
In:

No.	Pos.	Nation	Player
14	DF	CHN	Ding Guoliang (from Henan Jianye)
19	MF	CHN	Liu Wenzhi (Free Agent)
39	FW	KOR	Kim Young-hoo (Free Agent)
61	MF	CHN	Yang Xinxin (from Harbin Yiteng)
62	DF	CHN	Liu Zijun (Free Agent)
63	MF	CHN	Jin Kaifang (Free Agent)

Out:

No.	Pos.	Nation	Player
24	DF	ITA	Giuseppe Aquaro (to (Italy) Lupa Castelli Romani)

=== Tianjin Songjiang ===
In:

No.	Pos.	Nation	Player
11	FW	CHN	Zhang Shuo (loan from Guangzhou R&F)
13	FW	CHN	Xiang Baixu (loan from (France) AS Saint-Étienne)
30	FW	ENG	Frank Nouble (from (England) Coventry City)
38	MF	CHN	Zheng Dalun (loan from Shanghai SIPG)

Out:

No.	Pos.	Nation	Player

=== Wuhan Zall ===
In:

No.	Pos.	Nation	Player
11	MF	CHN	Zhang Jian (Free Agent)
28	MF	CHN	Cheng Jin (loan from Hangzhou Greentown)
29	MF	CHN	Yue Xin (loan from Hangzhou Greentown)

Out:

No.	Pos.	Nation	Player
15	DF	CHN	Long Cheng (to Henan Jianye)

=== Xinjiang Tianshan Leopard ===
In:

No.	Pos.	Nation	Player
33	FW	BRA	Rafael (from (Mexico) Zacatepec)

Out:

No.	Pos.	Nation	Player
9	FW	BRA	Felipe (to (Japan) Kyoto Sanga)

=== Yanbian Changbaishan ===
In:

No.	Pos.	Nation	Player
18	FW	KOR	Ha Tae-goon (from (South Korea) Suwon Samsung Bluewings)

Out:

No.	Pos.	Nation	Player
3	DF	CHN	Han Guanghua (Retired)
18	FW	KOR	Ha Tae-goon (loan return to (South Korea) Suwon Samsung Bluewings)
43	MF	CHN	Wu Qingsong (to Hangzhou Greentown)
53	FW	CHN	Lian Renjie (to Guangxi Longguida)

== League Two ==
=== North League ===
==== Baoding Yingli ETS ====
In:

No.	Pos.	Nation	Player
13	MF	CHN	Yang Hao (Free Agent)
19	MF	CHN	Guo Yiyuan (Free Agent)
22	MF	CHN	Li Lingwei (from Guangzhou R&F)
24	FW	CHN	Du Junpeng (from Tianjin Teda)
26	MF	CHN	Cao Chen (Free Agent)
30	MF	CHN	Chen Lei (Free Agent)
33	MF	CHN	Di You (from Nei Mongol Zhongyou)

Out:

No.	Pos.	Nation	Player

==== Baotou Nanjiao ====
In:

No.	Pos.	Nation	Player
3	DF	CHN	He Zitong (loan from Changchun Yatai)
9	FW	CHN	Yu Liang (Free Agent)
11	DF	CHN	Wu Hang (Free Agent)
13	DF	CHN	Ao Damu (Free Agent)
26	GK	CHN	Zhou Miao (Free Agent)
31	MF	CHN	Zhang Yu (Free Agent)
32	DF	CHN	Yang Junjie (Free Agent)

Out:

No.	Pos.	Nation	Player

==== Dalian Transcendence ====
In:

No.	Pos.	Nation	Player

Out:

No.	Pos.	Nation	Player
28	DF	CHN	Ji Zhengyu (loan return to Dalian Aerbin)

==== Hebei Elite ====
In:

No.	Pos.	Nation	Player

Out:

No.	Pos.	Nation	Player
27	DF	CHN	Ma Sheng (loan to (Brazil) Botafogo)

==== Tianjin Huochetou ====
In:

No.	Pos.	Nation	Player
30	DF	CHN	Fang Jianyu (loan from Chongqing Lifan)

Out:

No.	Pos.	Nation	Player

==== Nanjing Qianbao ====
In:

No.	Pos.	Nation	Player
33	MF	CHN	Zhu Yongzhou (Free Agent)

Out:

No.	Pos.	Nation	Player

==== Shenyang Dongjin ====
In:

No.	Pos.	Nation	Player

Out:

No.	Pos.	Nation	Player

==== Yinchuan Helanshan ====
In:

No.	Pos.	Nation	Player

Out:

No.	Pos.	Nation	Player
23	MF	CHN	Li Shuai (loan return to Guizhou Renhe)

=== South League ===
==== Anhui Litian ====
In:

No.	Pos.	Nation	Player
4	MF	CHN	Liao Chengjian (loan from Shanghai Shenxin)
18	MF	CHN	Song Chao (Free Agent)
27	MF	CHN	Tan Fucheng (loan from Shanghai Shenxin)
28	MF	CHN	Pan Yuchen (loan from Qingdao Jonoon)
31	MF	CHN	Wei Zhaokun (loan from Hangzhou Greentown)
32	MF	CHN	Shen Jin (loan from Hangzhou Greentown)
33	DF	CHN	Wang Boren (Free Agent)

Out:

No.	Pos.	Nation	Player

==== Fujian Broncos ====
In:

No.	Pos.	Nation	Player
37	DF	CHN	Wang Chao (Free Agent)
-	DF	CHN	Cao Zhenjie (Free Agent)

Out:

No.	Pos.	Nation	Player

==== Guangxi Longguida ====
In:

No.	Pos.	Nation	Player
11	MF	CHN	Ma Dongnan (Free Agent)
12	MF	CHN	Ren Xinlong (Free Agent)
22	DF	CHN	Chen Zhiwei (Free Agent)
28	FW	CHN	Wang Si (loan from Changchun Yatai)
29	MF	CHN	Zhang Sen (Free Agent)
30	MF	CHN	Jin Wu (Free Agent)
39	FW	CHN	Lian Renjie (from Yanbian Changbaishan)

Out:

No.	Pos.	Nation	Player

==== Lijiang Jiayunhao ====
In:

No.	Pos.	Nation	Player

Out:

No.	Pos.	Nation	Player

==== Meixian Hakka ====
In:

No.	Pos.	Nation	Player
16	MF	CHN	Pan Jiajun (loan from Guangzhou R&F)
19	MF	CHN	Zhang Xingbo (loan from Nei Mongol Zhongyou)

Out:

No.	Pos.	Nation	Player

==== Meizhou Kejia ====
In:

No.	Pos.	Nation	Player
16	MF	CHN	Ba Dun (loan from Beijing Guoan)
18	FW	CHN	Cao Tianbao (Free Agent)
25	GK	CHN	Hong Zhiyue (Free Agent)
30	DF	CHN	Tang Dechao (from Henan Jianye)

Out:

No.	Pos.	Nation	Player

==== Sichuan Longfor ====
In:

No.	Pos.	Nation	Player
7	FW	CHN	Lu Cheng (Free Agent)

Out:

No.	Pos.	Nation	Player

==== Yunnan Wanhao ====
In:

No.	Pos.	Nation	Player

Out:

No.	Pos.	Nation	Player
