= Li Shuai =

Li Shuai may refer to:

- Li Shuai (footballer, born 1982), Chinese football goalkeeper
- Li Shuai (footballer, born 1994), Chinese football midfielder
- Li Shuai (footballer, born 1995), Chinese football defender
