= Chen Fujun =

Chinese association football player

Personal information
- Date of birth: 8 November 1997 (age 29)
- Place of birth: Shanghai, China
- Height: 1.80 m (5 ft 11 in)
- Position: Midfielder

Youth career
- –2016: Shanghai SIPG
- 2017–2018: Shenzhen FC

Senior career*
Years	Team	Apps	(Gls)
2018–2020	Shenzhen FC	9	(0)
2021	Nantong Zhiyun	5	(0)
2022	Inner Mongolia Caoshangfei	4	(0)
2023	Shenzhen Juniors		
2023	Quanzhou Yassin	6	(0)
- * Club domestic league appearances and goals as of 13:14, 5 May 2022 (UTC)

Chen Fujun (simplified Chinese: 陈阜俊; traditional Chinese: 陳阜俊; pinyin: Chén Fùjùn; born 8 November 1997) is a Chinese footballer who plays as a midfielder.

== Club career ==
Chen Fujun would play for the Shenzhen FC youth team and was promoted to the senior team in the 2018 China League One campaign where he made his debut in a Chinese FA Cup game on 10 April 2018 against Suzhou Dongwu in a 2-1 defeat. He go on to be part of the squad would gain promotion to the top tier at the end of the league campaign.

== Career statistics ==
As of 31 December 2020.

Club	Season	League			Cup		Continental		Other		Total	
Club	Season	Division	Apps	Goals	Apps	Goals	Apps	Goals	Apps	Goals	Apps	Goals
Shenzhen FC	2018	China League One	1	0	1 (Note: Appearances in the Chinese FA Cup)	0	–		–		2	0
Shenzhen FC	2019	Chinese Super League	8	0	0	0	–		–		8	0
Shenzhen FC	2020	Chinese Super League	0	0	0	0	–		–		0	0
Career total			9	0	1	0	0	0	0	0	10	0
