= Qi Yunfei =

Chinese footballer

Qi Yunfei 祁云飞
Personal information
- Full name: Qi Yunfei
- Date of birth: 5 January 1989 (age 37)
- Place of birth: Hubei, China
- Height: 1.76 m (5 ft 9 1/2 in)
- Position: Midfielder

Team information
- Current team: Wuhan Three Towns
- Number: 13

Senior career*
Years	Team	Apps	(Gls)
2008–2011	Henan Jianye	2	(0)
2012–2018	Xinjiang Tianshan Leopard	71	(0)
2019–	Wuhan Three Towns	10	(0)
- * Club domestic league appearances and goals as of 11 October 2019

Qi Yunfei (Chinese: 祁云飞; born 5 January 1989 in Hubei) is a Chinese footballer who plays for Wuhan Three Towns in the China League Two.

== Club career ==
In 2008 Qi started his professional footballer career with Henan Jianye in the Chinese Super League. He would eventually make his league debut for Henan on September 7, 2008, in a game against Changsha Ginde. In January 2012, Qi moved to China League Two club Hubei China-Kyle.

In February 2019, Qi transferred to League Two side Wuhan Three Towns.

== Career statistics ==
Statistics accurate as of match played 11 October 2019.

Club performance			League		Cup		League Cup		Continental		Total	
Season	Club	League	Apps	Goals	Apps	Goals	Apps	Goals	Apps	Goals	Apps	Goals
China PR			League		FA Cup		CSL Cup		Asia		Total	
2008	Henan Jianye	Chinese Super League	2	0	-		-		-		2	0
2009	Henan Jianye	Chinese Super League	0	0	-		-		-		0	0
2010	Henan Jianye	Chinese Super League	0	0	-		-		0	0	0	0
2011	Henan Jianye	Chinese Super League	0	0	0	0	-		-		0	0
2012	Xinjiang Tianshan Leopard	China League Two	11	0	-		-		-		11	0
2013	Xinjiang Tianshan Leopard	China League One	0	0	1	0	-		-		1	0
2014	Xinjiang Tianshan Leopard	China League One	13	0	1	1	-		-		14	1
2015	Xinjiang Tianshan Leopard	China League One	10	0	0	0	-		-		10	0
2016	Xinjiang Tianshan Leopard	China League One	4	0	0	0	-		-		4	0
2017	Xinjiang Tianshan Leopard	China League One	17	0	1	0	-		-		18	0
2018	Xinjiang Tianshan Leopard	China League One	16	0	1	0	-		-		17	0
2019	Wuhan Three Towns	China League Two	10	0	0	0	-		-		10	0
Career total			83	0	4	1	0	0	0	0	87	1
