= Qiao Wei =

Chinese footballer

Qiao Wei 乔巍
Personal information
- Date of birth: July 20, 1987 (age 39)
- Place of birth: Luoyang, Henan, China
- Height: 1.87 m (6 ft 1 1/2 in)
- Position: Defender

Youth career
- Henan Jianye

Senior career*
Years	Team	Apps	(Gls)
2007–2014	Henan Jianye	69	(1)
2016–2020	Shenzhen FC	51	(1)
- * Club domestic league appearances and goals as of 18 March 2023

Qiao Wei (Chinese: 乔巍; born 20 July 1987 in Luoyang) is a Chinese former professional footballer who played as a defender.

== Club career ==
In 2007, Qiao Wei started his professional footballer career with Henan Jianye in the Chinese Super League. He would eventually make his league debut for Henan on May 18, 2008 in a game against Qingdao Jonoon, coming on as a substitute for Wang Shouting in the 83rd minute. He would go on to establish himself as a regular within the team, however at the 2012 Chinese Super League season he was part of the squad that was relegated. While he was part of the squad that immediately won promotion back into the top tier he saw his playing time reduced the following season before being dropped to the reserves.

On 9 July 2016, Qiao signed for China League One side Shenzhen FC. He would make his debut in a league game on 23 July 2016 against Wuhan Zall in a 2-0 defeat. After the game he would go on to establish himself as vital member of the team and would go on help the club gain promotion at the end of the end of the 2018 China League One campaign.

== Career statistics ==
Statistics accurate as of match played 31 December 2020.

Appearances and goals by club, season and competition
Club	Season	League			National Cup		Continental		Other		Total	
Club	Season	Division	Apps	Goals	Apps	Goals	Apps	Goals	Apps	Goals	Apps	Goals
Henan Jianye	2007	Chinese Super League	0	0	-		-		-		0	0
Henan Jianye	2008	Chinese Super League	15	1	-		-		-		15	1
Henan Jianye	2009	Chinese Super League	14	0	-		-		-		14	0
Henan Jianye	2010	Chinese Super League	11	0	-		2	0	-		13	0
Henan Jianye	2011	Chinese Super League	8	0	1	0	-		-		9	0
Henan Jianye	2012	Chinese Super League	11	0	2	0	-		-		13	0
Henan Jianye	2013	China League One	4	0	0	0	-		-		4	0
Henan Jianye	2014	Chinese Super League	6	0	1	0	-		-		7	0
Henan Jianye	Total		69	1	4	0	2	0	0	0	75	1
Shenzhen FC	2016	China League One	6	0	0	0	-		-		6	0
Shenzhen FC	2017	China League One	14	0	1	0	-		-		15	0
Shenzhen FC	2018	China League One	26	0	0	0	-		-		26	0
Shenzhen FC	2019	Chinese Super League	20	1	1	0	-		-		21	1
Shenzhen FC	2020	Chinese Super League	7	0	1	0	-		-		8	0
Shenzhen FC	Total		73	1	3	0	0	0	0	0	76	1
Career total			142	2	7	0	2	0	0	0	151	2

== Honours ==
=== Club ===
Henan Jianye

- China League One: 2013
