= Zou You =

Chinese footballer

Zou You 邹游
Personal information
- Full name: Zou You
- Date of birth: September 22, 1985 (age 41)
- Place of birth: Dalian, Liaoning, China
- Height: 1.95 m (6 ft 5 in)
- Positions: Centre-back; defensive midfielder; forward

Youth career
- Dalian Shide

Senior career*
Years	Team	Apps	(Gls)
2004–2007	Dalian Shide	4	(1)
2004	→ Dalian Changbo	16	(5)
2006	→ Guangzhou Pharmaceutical	12	(1)
2008–2010	Henan Jianye	15	(0)
2011–2012	Fushun Xinye	16	(7)
2012–2014	Chengdu Blades	53	(0)
2015	Dalian Aerbin	17	(0)
2016–2022	Shaanxi Chang'an Athletic	87	(6)
2020	→ Xi'an UKD	8	(0)

International career
2005	China U20		
Medal record
Representing China
Men's football
AFC Youth Championship
Silver medal – second place	2004 َ Malaysia	Team
- * Club domestic league appearances and goals as of 31 December 2020

Zou You (Chinese: 邹游; born September 22, 1985) is a professional Chinese footballer.

== Club career ==
Zou You started his professional senior career with top-tier side Dalian Shide as a midfielder and was soon loaned out to second-tier club Dalian Changbo to gain some playing time. Upon his return to Dalian Shide he would make a handful of appearances as the club won the 2005 Chinese Super League title. His appearances for Dalian Shide would see him called up to the China U20 team that took part in the 2005 FIFA World Youth Championship where his height saw him play in two matches as a forward. After being unable to further establish himself with his club he would go on to loaned out once again to another second-tier club in Guangzhou Pharmaceutical during the 2006 league season. He would return to Dalian Shide once again in 2007 however he would only make one further league appearance and was allowed to be transferred to top-tier club Henan Construction in 2008.

At Henan Zou would spend three seasons with the club where he predominantly acted as a fringe player within the squad before being released from the club at the end of the 2010 league season. As a free agent he would join third-tier club Fushun Xinye where he would aid the team to a play-off league spot before they were knocked out in the second round. With Fushun not joining the third tier within the 2012 league season Zou would join second-tier club Chengdu Blades halfway through the 2012 league season.

In February 2015, Zou transferred to China League One side Dalian Aerbin.

In his later career, Zou signed for Shaanxi Chang'an. His first goal for the club was against Cangzhou Mighty Lions on 10 August 2019.

== Career statistics ==
Statistics accurate as of match played 31 December 2020.

Appearances and goals by club, season and competition
Club	Season	League			National Cup		League Cup		Continental		Total	
Club	Season	Division	Apps	Goals	Apps	Goals	Apps	Goals	Apps	Goals	Apps	Goals
Dalian Shide	2004	Chinese Super League	0	0	0	0	0	0	0	0	0	0
Dalian Shide	2005	Chinese Super League	3	1	0	0	0	0	-		3	1
Dalian Shide	2007	Chinese Super League	1	0	-		-		-		1	0
Dalian Shide	Total		4	1	0	0	0	0	0	0	4	1
Dalian Changbo (loan)	2004	China League One	16	5	0	0	-		-		16	5
Guangzhou Pharmaceutical (loan)	2006	China League One	12	1	0	0	-		-		12	1
Henan Construction	2008	Chinese Super League	10	0	-		-		-		10	0
Henan Construction	2009	Chinese Super League	5	0	-		-		-		5	0
Henan Construction	2010	Chinese Super League	0	0	-		-		1	0	1	0
Henan Construction	Total		15	0	0	0	0	0	1	0	16	0
Fushun Xinye	2011	China League Two	16	7	-		-		-		16	7
Chengdu Blades	2012	China League One	12	0	0	0	-		-		12	0
Chengdu Blades	2013	China League One	26	0	1	0	-		-		27	0
Chengdu Blades	2014	China League One	15	0	1	0	-		-		16	0
Chengdu Blades	Total		53	0	2	0	0	0	0	0	55	0
Dalian Aerbin	2015	China League One	17	0	1	0	-		-		18	0
Shaanxi Chang'an Athletic	2016	China Amateur Football League			-		-		-			
Shaanxi Chang'an Athletic	2017	China League Two	24	2	1	0	-		-		25	2
Shaanxi Chang'an Athletic	2018	China League Two	32	3	2	0	-		-		34	3
Shaanxi Chang'an Athletic	2019	China League One	11	1	2	0	-		-		13	1
Shaanxi Chang'an Athletic	Total		67	6	5	0	0	0	0	0	72	6
Xi'an UKD (loan)	2020	China League Two	8	0	-		-		-		8	0
Career total			208	20	8	0	0	0	1	0	217	20

== Honours ==
=== Club ===
Dalian Shide F.C.

- Chinese Super League: 2005
