= Zhou Yajun =

Chinese association football goalkeeper

Zhou Yajun 周亚君
Personal information
- Date of birth: October 17, 1984 (age 42)
- Place of birth: Shanghai, China
- Height: 1.86 m (6 ft 1 in)
- Position: Goalkeeper

Youth career
- Shanghai Shenhua
- Donghua University

Senior career*
Years	Team	Apps	(Gls)
2006–2007	Shanghai Shenhua	12	(0)
2008–2014	Henan Jianye	79	(0)
2016–2020	Shenzhen FC	38	(0)

Managerial career
- 2021: Suzhou Dongwu (goalkeeping)
- 2026: Shanghai Second
- * Club domestic league appearances and goals as of 31 December 2019

Zhou Yajun (Chinese: 周亚君) (born October 17, 1984 in Shanghai) is a Chinese football coach and former goalkeeper.

== Club career ==
=== Shenhua and University ===
Zhou Yajun began his football career with the various Shanghai Shenhua youth teams and took part in the squads that trained in Brazil, however instead of immediately continuing with his football career Zhou Yajun would instead continue with his studies and go to Donghua University where he still played football as a goalkeeper. Once he had completed his studies he was allowed to return to Shanghai Shenhua and by the 2006 Chinese Super League season he would start his professional football career as their third choice goalkeeper. His league debut would come on July 16, 2006 against Qingdao Zhongneng in a 2-0 win. Surprisingly he would find himself continuing to play in goal due to injury and suspensions to the other goalkeepers and by the end of the season he had played in 12 league games. Zhou Yajun's progression within the Shanghai Shenhua's football team was short lived when they merged with local football team Shanghai United F.C. and with the influx of players he found himself immediately dropped from the newly formed team throughout the 2007 league season.

=== Henan Construction ===
Zhou Yajun was surplus to requirements and was allowed to leave Shanghai Shenhua at the end of the 2007 league season and by the beginning of the 2008 Chinese Super League season he joined Henan Jianye. He would make his debut on their first game of the season on April 5, 2008 against Liaoning Whowin F.C. in a 3-3 draw. After that game he would become their first choice goalkeeper throughout the season. While he aided Henan to a respectable 10th within the league he was dropped in favour of new goalkeeper Zeng Cheng by new Manager Tang Yaodong at the beginning of the 2009 Chinese Super League.

=== Shenzhen FC ===
On 3 February 2016, Zhou signed for China League One club Shenzhen FC. He would make his debut in a league game on 12 March 2016 against Xinjiang Tianshan Leopard F.C. in a 2-1 victory. He would go on to be part of the squad that gained promotion at the end of the 2018 China League One campaign.

== Career statistics ==
Statistics accurate as of match played 31 December 2019.

Appearances and goals by club, season and competition
Club	Season	League			National Cup		Continental		Other		Total	
Club	Season	Division	Apps	Goals	Apps	Goals	Apps	Goals	Apps	Goals	Apps	Goals
Shanghai Shenhua	2006	Chinese Super League	12	0	1	0	2	0	-		15	0
Henan Construction	2008	Chinese Super League	28	0	-		-		-		28	0
Henan Construction	2009	Chinese Super League	0	0	-		-		-		0	0
Henan Construction	2010	Chinese Super League	1	0	-		0	0	-		1	0
Henan Construction	2011	Chinese Super League	1	0	1	0	-		-		2	0
Henan Construction	2012	Chinese Super League	4	0	1	0	-		-		5	0
Henan Construction	2013	China League One	29	0	0	0	-		-		29	0
Henan Construction	2014	Chinese Super League	16	0	1	0	-		-		17	0
Henan Construction	Total		79	0	3	0	0	0	0	0	82	0
Shenzhen FC	2016	China League One	25	0	0	0	-		-		25	0
Shenzhen FC	2017	China League One	4	0	2	0	-		-		6	0
Shenzhen FC	2018	China League One	8	0	1	0	-		-		9	0
Shenzhen FC	2019	Chinese Super League	1	0	0	0	-		-		1	0
Shenzhen FC	2020	Chinese Super League	0	0	0	0	-		-		0	0
Shenzhen FC	Total		38	0	3	0	0	0	0	0	41	0
Career total			129	0	7	0	2	0	0	0	138	0

== Honours ==
=== Club ===
Henan Construction

- China League One: 2013
