= 2013 Campeonato da 1ª Divisão do Futebol =

Campeonato da 1ª Divisão do Futebol
- Season: 2013
- Champions: Monte Carlo
- Matches: 90
- Goals: 369 (4.1 per match)
- Top goalscorer: Niki Torrão (23 goals)

The 2013 Campeonato da 1ª Divisão do Futebol started on 11 January 2013 and ended on 23 June 2013.

== League table ==
Pos	Team	Pld	W	D	L	GF	GA	GD	Pts	Qualification or relegation
1	Monte Carlo (C)	18	16	1	1	57	9	+48	49	
2	Benfica de Macau	18	16	0	2	69	4	+65	48	
3	Ka I	18	15	1	2	61	13	+48	46	
4	Lam Pak	18	12	0	6	55	22	+33	36	
5	Polícia	18	7	2	9	24	33	−9	23	
6	Lam Ieng	18	7	1	10	29	52	−23	22	
7	Kuan Tai	18	6	0	12	22	35	−13	18	
8	Chao Pak Kei	18	6	0	12	28	53	−25	18	
9	Kei Lun (R)	18	2	1	15	16	80	−64	7	Relegation to Second Division
10	MFA Develop (R)	18	0	0	18	8	68	−60	0	Relegation to Second Division

Updated to match(es) played on 23 June 2013. Source: Soccerway.com
Rules for classification: 1) points; 2) goal difference; 3) number of goals scored.
(C) Champions; (R) Relegated
