= Li Jiahao =

Chinese footballer (born 2001)

Personal information
- Date of birth: 22 June 2001 (age 25)
- Place of birth: Meizhou, Guangdong, China
- Height: 1.70 m (5 ft 7 in)
- Position: Midfielder

Team information
- Current team: Guangdong Wuchuan Youth

Youth career
- Guangzhou Evergrande

Senior career*
Years	Team	Apps	(Gls)
2021–2025	Guangzhou FC	10	(0)
2025-2026	Jiangxi Dingnan United	0	(0)
2025	→ Ganzhou Ruishi (loan)	6	(0)
2026–	Guangdong Wuchuan Youth	0	(0)

Managerial career
- 2025-2026: Ganzhou Ruishi (assistant)
- * Club domestic league appearances and goals as of 01:00, 9 March 2026 (UTC)

Li Jiahao (Chinese: 李嘉灏; born 22 June 2001) is a Chinese footballer currently playing as a midfielder for Guangdong Wuchuan Youth.

== Club career ==
Li started playing football in 2012, and was initially a ball boy for Guangzhou FC, who he would go on to sign for.

In March 2025, Li was loaned out to China League Two club Ganzhou Ruishi and being appointed as assistant coach at the same time.

== Career statistics ==
=== Club ===
As of 12 February 2023.

Club	Season	League			Cup		Continental		Other		Total	
Club	Season	Division	Apps	Goals	Apps	Goals	Apps	Goals	Apps	Goals	Apps	Goals
Guangzhou FC	2021	Chinese Super League	0	0	0	0	4 (Note: Appearances in the AFC Champions League)	0	0	0	4	0
Guangzhou FC	2022	Chinese Super League	2	0	0	0	5	0	0	0	7	0
Career total			2	0	0	0	9	0	0	0	11	0
