= Cheng Jin =

Chinese footballer (born 1995)

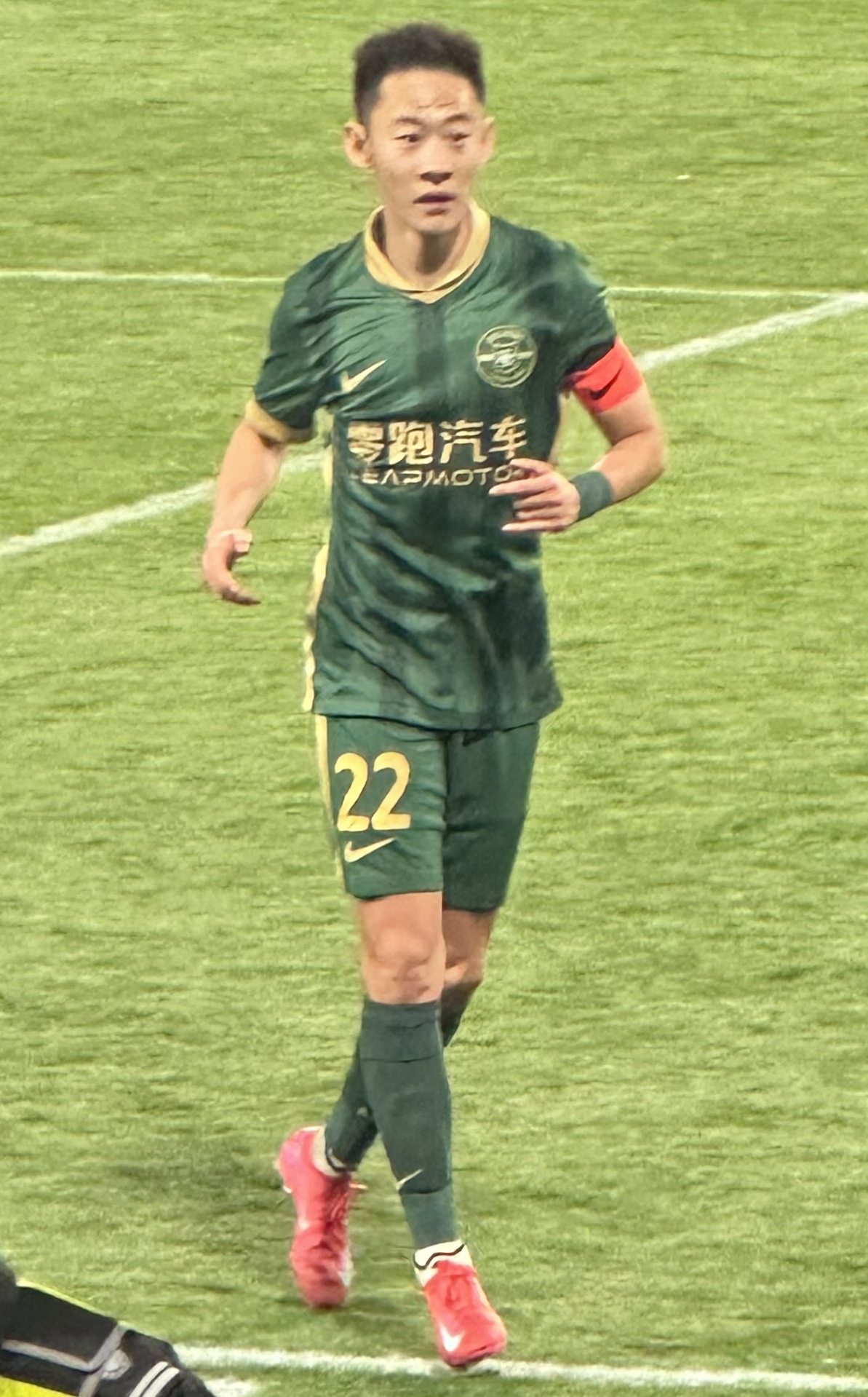
- Cheng in 2025

Personal information
- Date of birth: 18 February 1995 (age 31)
- Place of birth: Xinxiang, Henan, China
- Height: 1.75 m (5 ft 9 in)
- Position: Midfielder

Team information
- Current team: Zhejiang FC
- Number: 22

Youth career
- –2015: Hangzhou Greentown

Senior career*
Years	Team	Apps	(Gls)
2015–	Zhejiang FC	243	(20)
2015–2016	→ Wuhan Zall (loan)	27	(3)

International career^{‡}
2014	China U-19	2	(0)
2024–	China	4	(0)
- * Club domestic league appearances and goals as of 19 November 2026 ‡ National team caps and goals as of 12:06, 10 October 2024 (UTC)

Cheng Jin (simplified Chinese: 程进; traditional Chinese: 程進; pinyin: Chéng Jìn; born 18 January 1995) is a Chinese professional footballer who plays as a midfielder for Chinese Super League club Zhejiang FC and the China national team.

== Club career ==
Cheng Jin was born in Xinxiang in Henan where he played for his local primary school before moving to Zhejiang to continue his football development and work his way through the Zhejiang Professional youth team. He was promoted to the senior team and go on to make his senior debut on 8 July 2015 in a Chinese FA Cup game against Henan Jianye in a 3–1 defeat. Soon after the game on 16 July 2015, Cheng was loaned out to second tier club Wuhan Zall for six months.

At Wuhan he made his debut on 25 July 2015 in a league game against Beijing Enterprises Group where he also scored his first professional goal in a 1–0 victory. After gaining significant playing time at Wuhan he joined the club again the following season before returning to Zhejiang. At Zhejiang he made his league debut on 12 March 2017 against Neo Mongol Zhongyou in a 3–2 victory where he also scored his first goal for the club. He went on to establish himself as a vital member of the team as they gained promotion to the top tier at the end of the 2021 China League One season through a play-off victory against Qingdao.

== Career statistics ==
As of match played 25 May 2024

Appearances and goals by club, season and competition
Club	Season	League			Cup		Continental		Other		Total	
Club	Season	Division	Apps	Goals	Apps	Goals	Apps	Goals	Apps	Goals	Apps	Goals
Zhejiang FC	2015	Chinese Super League	0	0	1	0	–		–		1	0
Zhejiang FC	2016	Chinese Super League	0	0	0	0	–		–		0	0
Zhejiang FC	2017	China League One	28	2	1	0	–		–		29	2
Zhejiang FC	2018	China League One	27	2	0	0	–		–		27	2
Zhejiang FC	2019	China League One	22	4	0	0	–		–		22	4
Zhejiang FC	2020	China League One	14	1	1	0	–		2 (Note: Appearances in Promotion/Relegation Play-offs)	0	17	1
Zhejiang FC	2021	China League One	33	3	0	0	–		2	0	35	3
Zhejiang FC	2022	Chinese Super League	29	1	0	0	–		–		29	1
Zhejiang FC	2023	Chinese Super League	16	2	2	1	6	0	—		24	3
Zhejiang FC	2024	Chinese Super League	14	1	0	0	—		—		14	1
Zhejiang FC	Total		183	16	5	1	6	0	4	0	198	17
Wuhan Zall (loan)	2015	China League One	12	2	0	0	–		–		12	2
Wuhan Zall (loan)	2016	China League One	15	1	0	0	–		–		15	1
Wuhan Zall (loan)	Total		27	3	0	0	0	0	0	0	27	3
Career total			210	19	5	1	6	0	4	0	225	20
