= Li Qiang (footballer) =

Chinese association football player

Personal information
- Date of birth: 23 January 1998 (age 28)
- Place of birth: Helong, Jilin, China
- Height: 1.72 m (5 ft 8 in)
- Position: Midfielder

Team information
- Current team: Changchun Yatai
- Number: 6

Senior career*
Years	Team	Apps	(Gls)
2017–2018	Yanbian Funde	14	(2)
2019	Shenzhen FC	1	(0)
2021–2025	Yanbian Longding	95	(2)
2026–	Changchun Yatai	0	(0)
- * Club domestic league appearances and goals as of 14:01, 31 December 2025 (UTC)

Li Qiang (simplified Chinese: 李强; traditional Chinese: 李強; pinyin: Lǐ Qiáng; born 23 January 1998) is a Chinese professional footballer who currently plays as a left-footed midfielder for Changchun Yatai.

== Club career ==
Li Qiang would be promoted to the senior team of Yanbian Funde and go on to make his debut in a Chinese FA Cup game against Shenyang Urban F.C. on 10 April 2018 that ended in a 1–1 draw, but was lost in a penalty shootout. He would gradually start to establish as a young regular within the team, however Yanbian were in financial difficulties and he was allowed to leave the club. On 1 March 2019, Li joined newly promoted top-tier club Shenzhen FC. He would make his debut in a league game against Chongqing Dangdai Lifan F.C. on 31 March 2019 in a 1–0 defeat.

== Career statistics ==
As of 31 December 2025.

Club	Season	League			Cup		Continental		Other		Total	
Club	Season	Division	Apps	Goals	Apps	Goals	Apps	Goals	Apps	Goals	Apps	Goals
Yanbian Funde	2017	Chinese Super League	0	0	0	0	–		–		0	0
Yanbian Funde	2018	China League One	14	2	1	0	–		–		15	2
Yanbian Funde	Total		14	2	1	0	0	0	0	0	15	2
Shenzhen FC	2019	Chinese Super League	1	0	0	0	–		–		1	0
Yanbian Longding	2021	China League Two	6	0	0	0	–		–		6	0
Yanbian Longding	2022	China League Two	14	0	1	0	–		–		15	0
Yanbian Longding	2023	China League One	24	1	1	0	–		–		25	1
Yanbian Longding	2024	China League One	25	1	1	0	–		–		26	1
Yanbian Longding	2025	China League One	26	0	1	0	–		–		27	0
Yanbian Longding	Total		95	2	4	0	0	0	0	0	99	2
Career total			110	4	5	0	0	0	0	0	115	4
