= Yu Yongzhe =

Chinese footballer

Yu Yongzhe 余勇喆
Personal information
- Date of birth: February 24, 1985 (age 41)
- Place of birth: Chongqing, China
- Height: 1.85 m (6 ft 1 in)
- Position: Goalkeeper

Senior career*
Years	Team	Apps	(Gls)
2003–2007	Chengdu Wuniu	3	(0)
2008–2010	Chongqing Lifan	32	(0)
2011–2014	Guangdong Sunray Cave	57	(0)
2015	Hangzhou Greentown	0	(0)
2015	→ Jiangxi Liansheng (loan)	0	(0)
- * Club domestic league appearances and goals as of 1 November 2015

Yu Yongzhe (Chinese: 余勇喆; pinyin: Yú Yǒngzhé; born February 24, 1985) is a Chinese football goalkeeper.

== Club career ==
=== Chengdu Wuniu ===
Yu Yongzhe grew up from a football family and with the help of his uncle he would be included in the youth team for Chengdu Wuniu by the time he was sixteen years old. His youth development would be considered good enough to be included in the senior team and on November 23, 2003, he would make his debut against Guangdong Xiongying in a 1–0 victory. After making his debut he would return to being a reserve goalkeeper, however his development would be stunted when Guan Zhen and then later former Chinese internal Fu Bin were brought in to help the team to push for promotion to the top tier.

=== Chongqing Lifan ===
Dropped to the reserves at Chengdu Wuniu, Yu Yongzhe would transfer to fellow second-tier side Chongqing Lifan in the 2008 league season where he would immediately make himself the second choice goalkeeper, behind He Zhengyuan. While his playing time was limited he would see the club promoted to the top tier after only being with them for one season when the club came second within the 2008 league season. The following league season saw Chongqing struggle to fight off relegation and He Zhengyuan was dropped from the team, the new manager Arie Haan gave Yu Yongzhe his opportunity to stake a claim to be a regular and he took it against the defending champions Shandong Luneng on June 20, 2009, in a 0–0 draw.

=== Hangzhou Greentown ===
On 6 July 2015, Yu joined the Chinese Super League side Hangzhou Greentown, he was then loaned to China League One side Jiangxi Liansheng until 31 December 2015.
