= Han Fangteng =

Chinese footballer

Han Fangteng 韩方腾
Personal information
- Date of birth: 22 March 1985 (age 41)
- Place of birth: Dalian, Liaoning, China
- Height: 1.87 m (6 ft 1 1/2 in)
- Position: Goalkeeper

Youth career
- Shandong Luneng Taishan

Senior career*
| Years | Team | Apps | (Gls) |
| 2006 | Shanghai United | 2 | (0) |
| 2007–2010 | Shanghai Shenhua | 0 | (0) |
| 2007 | → Suzhou Trips (loan) | ? | (0) |
| 2009 | → Qingdao QUST (loan) | ? | (0) |
| 2010 | → Harbin Yiteng (loan) | ? | (0) |
| 2011–2014 | Harbin Yiteng | 85 | (0) |
| 2015–2019 | Nei Mongol Zhongyou | 68 | (0) |
- * Club domestic league appearances and goals as of 31 December 2019

Han Fangteng (Chinese: 韩方腾; born 22 March 1985) is a retired Chinese football player.

== Club career ==
In 2006, Han Fangteng started his professional footballer career with Shanghai United in the Chinese Super League. He would eventually make his league debut for Shanghai on 15 October 2006 in a game against Shenyang Ginde that ended in a 3-1 victory. The following season saw Shanghai United merged with fellow top tier club Shanghai Shenhua, leading to a significantly larger squad.

In March 2007, he was loaned out to China League Two side Suzhou Trips until 31 December. On his return to Shanghai he did not make any appearances and in March 2009, he was loaned out to China League Two side Qingdao QUST until 31 December. Once again in March 2010, he was loaned out to another China League Two side Harbin Yiteng until 31 December.

In March 2011, Han transferred to China League Two side Harbin Yiteng. In the 2011 China League Two campaign he would be part of the team that won the division and promotion into the second tier. He would go on to be a member of the squad as they moved up divisions and gained promotion to the Chinese Super League.

In January 2015, Han transferred to China League One side Nei Mongol Zhongyou. He would remain with them for several seasons until the end of the 2019 campaign when he retired.

== Career statistics ==
Statistics accurate as of match played 31 December 2019.

Appearances and goals by club, season and competition
| Club | Season | League | | | National Cup | | Continental | | Other | | Total | |
| Club | Season | Division | Apps | Goals | Apps | Goals | Apps | Goals | Apps | Goals | Apps | Goals |
|---|---|---|---|---|---|---|---|---|---|---|---|---|
| Shanghai United | 2006 | Chinese Super League | 2 | 0 | 0 | 0 | - | | - | | 2 | 0 |
| Shanghai Shenhua | 2008 | Chinese Super League | 0 | 0 | - | | - | | - | | 0 | 0 |
| Suzhou Trips (loan) | 2007 | China League Two | | 0 | - | | - | | - | | | 0 |
| Qingdao QUST (loan) | 2009 | China League Two | | 0 | - | | - | | - | | | 0 |
| Harbin Yiteng (loan) | 2010 | China League Two | | 0 | - | | - | | - | | | 0 |
| Harbin Yiteng | 2011 | China League Two | 19 | 0 | 0 | 0 | - | | - | | 19 | 0 |
| Harbin Yiteng | 2012 | China League One | 30 | 0 | 1 | 0 | - | | - | | 31 | 0 |
| Harbin Yiteng | 2013 | China League One | 23 | 0 | 2 | 0 | - | | - | | 25 | 0 |
| Harbin Yiteng | 2014 | Chinese Super League | 13 | 0 | 0 | 0 | - | | - | | 13 | 0 |
| Harbin Yiteng | Total | | 85 | 0 | 3 | 0 | 0 | 0 | 0 | 0 | 88 | 0 |
| Nei Mongol Zhongyou | 2015 | China League One | 27 | 0 | 2 | 0 | - | | - | | 29 | 0 |
| Nei Mongol Zhongyou | 2016 | China League One | 27 | 0 | 2 | 0 | - | | - | | 29 | 0 |
| Nei Mongol Zhongyou | 2017 | China League One | 5 | 0 | 2 | 0 | - | | - | | 7 | 0 |
| Nei Mongol Zhongyou | 2018 | China League One | 9 | 0 | 1 | 0 | - | | - | | 10 | 0 |
| Nei Mongol Zhongyou | 2019 | China League One | 0 | 0 | 0 | 0 | - | | - | | 0 | 0 |
| Nei Mongol Zhongyou | Total | | 68 | 0 | 7 | 0 | 0 | 0 | 0 | 0 | 75 | 0 |
| Career total | | | 155 | 0 | 10 | 0 | 0 | 0 | 0 | 0 | 165 | 0 |

== Honours ==
=== Club ===
Harbin Yiteng

- China League Two: 2011
