= Jin Qiang =

Chinese footballer

Jin Qiang 金强
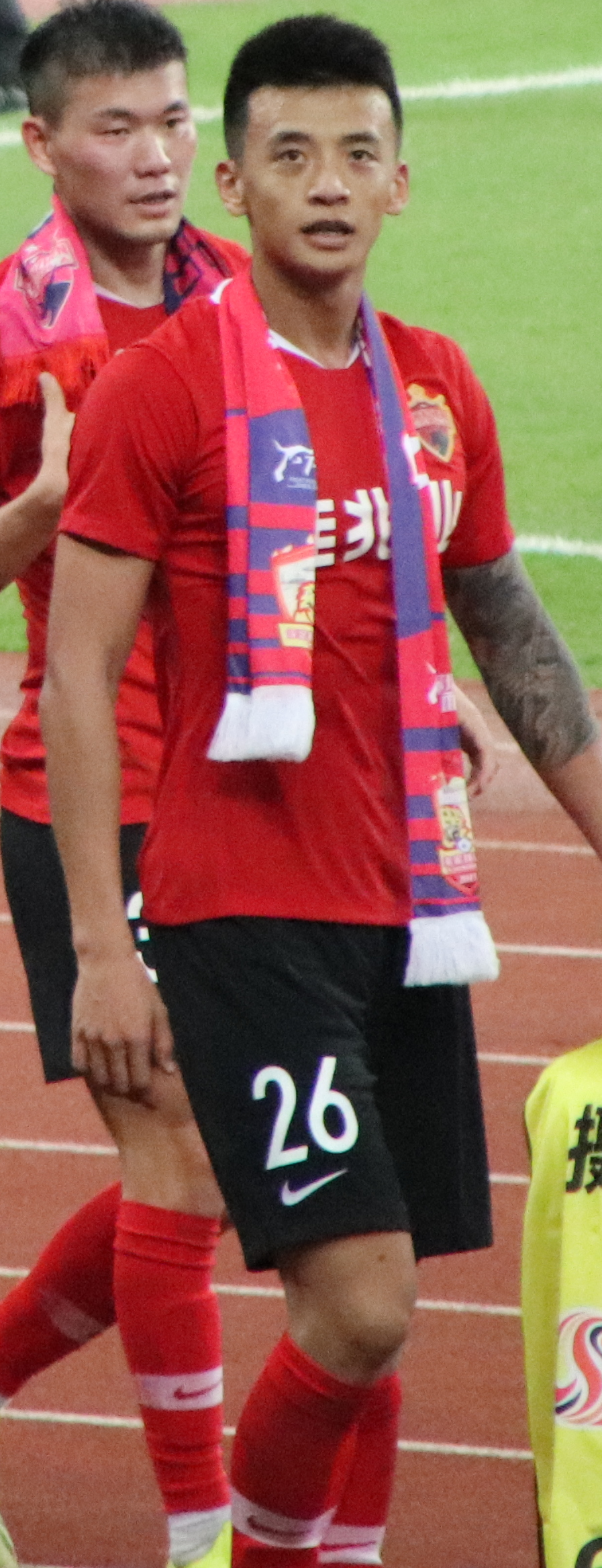

Personal information
- Date of birth: 15 January 1993 (age 33)
- Place of birth: Dalian, Liaoning, China
- Height: 1.85 m (6 ft 1 in)
- Position: Defensive midfielder

Team information
- Current team: Suzhou Dongwu
- Number: 15

Senior career*
Years	Team	Apps	(Gls)
2013–2018	Dalian Yifang	98	(2)
2019–2022	Shenzhen FC	31	(1)
2021	→ Hebei FC (loan)	9	(0)
2023	Dalian Zhixing	19	(0)
2024	Guangdong GZ-Power	24	(0)
2026–	Suzhou Dongwu	0	(0)
- * Club domestic league appearances and goals as of 31 January 2023

Jin Qiang (Chinese: 金强; born 15 January 1993) is a Chinese professional footballer who plays as a defensive midfielder who plays for China League One club Suzhou Dongwu.

== Club career ==
Jin started his professional football career in 2013 when he was promoted to Chinese Super League side Dalian Aerbin's first team squad. On 13 August 2014, he made his league debut for Dalian Aerbin in the 2014 Chinese Super League against Guangzhou Evergrande in a 2-1 defeat. Throughout the campaign he was given the chance to play in several games, however he was unfortunately part of the squad that was relegated to the second tier at the end of the league season. The following season Jin would establish himself as a regular within the team's midfield and by the end of the 2017 league season he would be a vital member of the squad that won the division championship and promotion back into the top tier.

On 14 February 2019, Jin transferred to Chinese Super League newcomer Shenzhen FC. He would go on to make his debut for Shenzhen in a league game against Hebei China Fortune on the 2 March 2019 in a 3-1 victory. This would be followed by his first goal for the club, which was in a league game on 20 April 2019 against Beijing Renhe in a 2-2 draw. While Jin would establish himself as a regular within the team, he would be part of the squad that finished in the relegation zone, however the club was given a reprieve after fellow top tier club Tianjin Tianhai was dissolved after the 2019 season. In the following campaign, Jin would only be an infrequent member of the squad.

On 7 April 2021, Jin was loaned out to fellow top tier club Hebei FC for the 2021 Chinese Super League campaign. On 19 July 2021 he would make his debut for the club in a league game against Changchun Yatai F.C. in a 2-1 victory. At the end of the campaign he would establish himself as a regular within the team before returning to Shenzhen.

== Career statistics ==
Statistics accurate as of match played 31 January 2023.

Appearances and goals by club, season and competition
Club	Season	League			National Cup		Continental		Other		Total	
Club	Season	Division	Apps	Goals	Apps	Goals	Apps	Goals	Apps	Goals	Apps	Goals
Dalian Yifang	2013	Chinese Super League	0	0	1	0	-		-		1	0
Dalian Yifang	2014	Chinese Super League	8	0	1	0	-		-		9	0
Dalian Yifang	2015	China League One	26	1	1	0	-		-		27	1
Dalian Yifang	2016	China League One	19	0	1	0	-		-		20	0
Dalian Yifang	2017	China League One	28	0	0	0	-		-		28	0
Dalian Yifang	2018	Chinese Super League	17	1	3	0	-		-		20	1
Dalian Yifang	Total		98	2	7	0	0	0	0	0	105	2
Shenzhen FC	2019	Chinese Super League	24	1	1	0	-		-		25	1
Shenzhen FC	2020	Chinese Super League	4	0	1	0	-		-		5	0
Shenzhen FC	2022	Chinese Super League	3	0	1	0	-		-		4	0
Shenzhen FC	Total		31	1	3	0	0	0	0	0	34	1
Hebei FC (loan)	2021	Chinese Super League	9	0	1	0	-		-		10	0
Career total			138	3	11	0	0	0	0	0	149	3

== Honours ==
=== Club ===
Dalian Yifang

- China League One: 2017
