= Yue Xin (footballer) =

Chinese footballer

Yue Xin 岳鑫
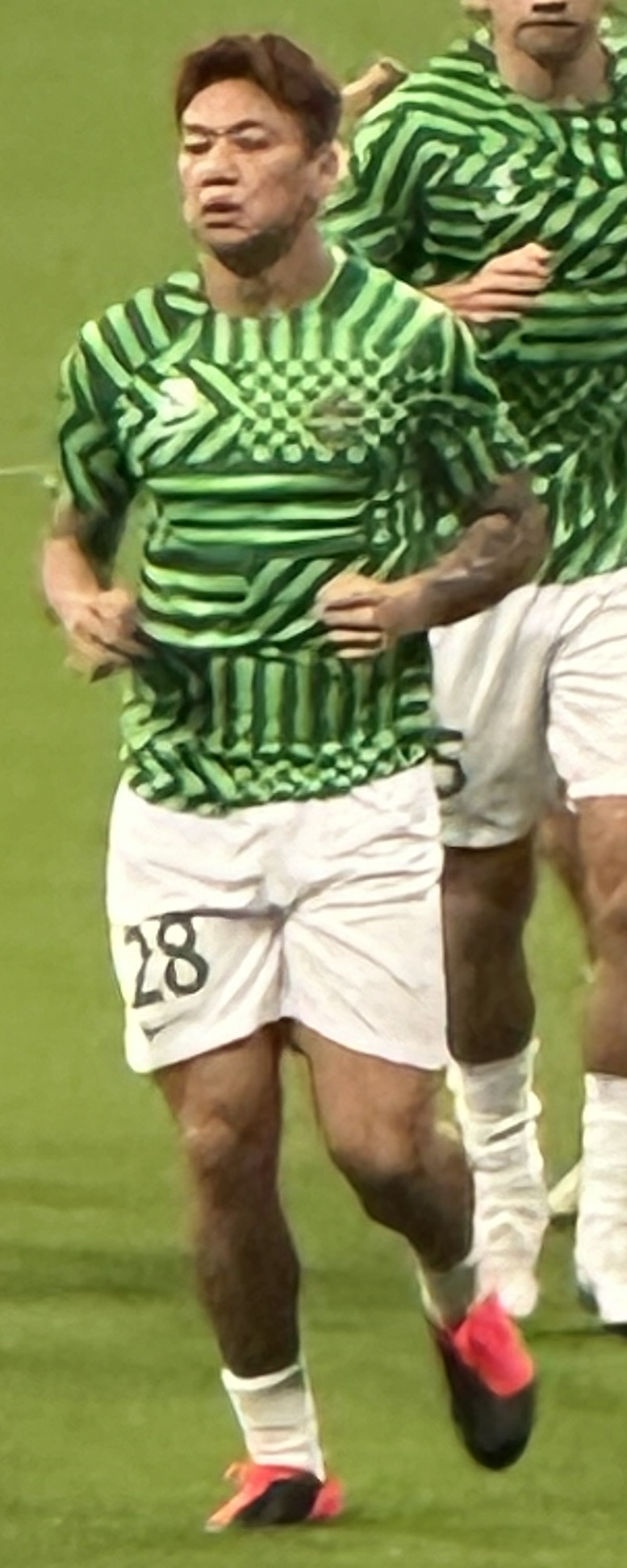
- Yue Xin in August 2024

Personal information
- Date of birth: 10 November 1995 (age 31)
- Place of birth: Wuhan, Hubei, China
- Height: 1.77 m (5 ft 9 1/2 in)
- Position: Left-back

Team information
- Current team: Shanghai Port
- Number: 28

Senior career*
Years	Team	Apps	(Gls)
2013	Liaoning Youth	9	(0)
2014–2015	Dalian Aerbin	7	(0)
2015–2025	Zhejiang FC	203	(5)
2015	→ Wuhan Zall (loan)	12	(0)
2016–2017	→ Vejle Boldklub (loan)	12	(0)
2026–	Shanghai Port	17	(1)

International career^{‡}
2013–2014	China U-20	5	(0)
2017	China U-23	1	(0)
- * Club domestic league appearances and goals as of 19 November 2026 ‡ National team caps and goals as of 19 July 2017

Yue Xin (Chinese: 岳鑫; born 10 November 1995) is a Chinese football player who currently plays as a left-back for Chinese Super League club Shanghai Port.

== Club career ==
Yue started his professional football career in 2013 when he was loaned to Liaoning Youth's squad for the 2013 China League Two campaign. He joined Chinese Super League's newcomer Dalian Aerbin in 2014. On 20 July 2014, Yue made his debut for Dalian Aerbin in the 2014 Chinese Super League against Shanghai Shenxin, coming on as a substitute for Chen Tao in the 89th minute. He would only make a handful of appearances for the club as they were relegated at the end of the season. The following season he was unable to improve upon his position within the club and on 22 June 2015, Yue transferred to Chinese Super League side Hangzhou Greentown.

On 16 July 2015, Yue was loaned to China League One side Wuhan Zall until 31 December 2015. In September 2016, Yue was loaned to Vejle Boldklub. He left the club after the loan spell was not extended and he returned to his parent club. On 5 August 2017, Yue would finally make his debut for Hangzhou in a league game against Yunnan Lijiang in a 1-1 draw. After the game he would quickly start to establish himself as a regular member within the team as they renamed themselves Zhejiang Professional. He would then play a vital part as the club gained promotion to the top tier at the end of the 2021 campaign.On 19 December 2025, the club announced Yue's departure after the 2025 season.

On 19 January 2026, Yue joined the 2025 Chinese Super League champion Shanghai Port.

== Career statistics ==
Statistics accurate as of match played 31 January 2023.

Appearances and goals by club, season and competition
Club	Season	League			National Cup		Continental		Other		Total	
Club	Season	Division	Apps	Goals	Apps	Goals	Apps	Goals	Apps	Goals	Apps	Goals
Liaoning Youth	2013	China League Two	9	0	-		-		-		9	0
Dalian Aerbin	2014	Chinese Super League	5	0	0	0	-		-		5	0
Dalian Aerbin	2015	China League One	2	0	1	0	-		-		3	0
Dalian Aerbin	Total		7	0	1	0	0	0	0	0	8	0
Hangzhou Greentown/ Zhejiang Greentown/ Zhejiang FC	2016	Chinese Super League	0	0	0	0	-		-		0	0
Hangzhou Greentown/ Zhejiang Greentown/ Zhejiang FC	2017	China League One	11	0	0	0	-		-		11	0
Hangzhou Greentown/ Zhejiang Greentown/ Zhejiang FC	2018	China League One	29	2	0	0	-		-		29	2
Hangzhou Greentown/ Zhejiang Greentown/ Zhejiang FC	2019	China League One	28	1	0	0	-		-		28	1
Hangzhou Greentown/ Zhejiang Greentown/ Zhejiang FC	2020	China League One	14	1	1	0	-		2 (Note: Appearances in Promotion/Relegation Play-offs)	0	17	1
Hangzhou Greentown/ Zhejiang Greentown/ Zhejiang FC	2021	China League One	30	1	0	0	-		2	0	32	1
Hangzhou Greentown/ Zhejiang Greentown/ Zhejiang FC	2022	Chinese Super League	29	0	4	0	-		-		33	0
Hangzhou Greentown/ Zhejiang Greentown/ Zhejiang FC	2023	Chinese Super League	0	0	0	0	0	0	-		0	0
Hangzhou Greentown/ Zhejiang Greentown/ Zhejiang FC	Total		141	5	5	0	0	0	4	0	150	5
Wuhan Zall (loan)	2015	China League One	12	0	0	0	-		-		12	0
Vejle Boldklub (loan)	2016–17	Danish 1st Division	12	0	0	0	-		-		12	0
Career total			181	5	6	0	0	0	4	0	191	5
