= Wang Dalong =

Chinese footballer (born 1989)

Wang Dalong 王大龙
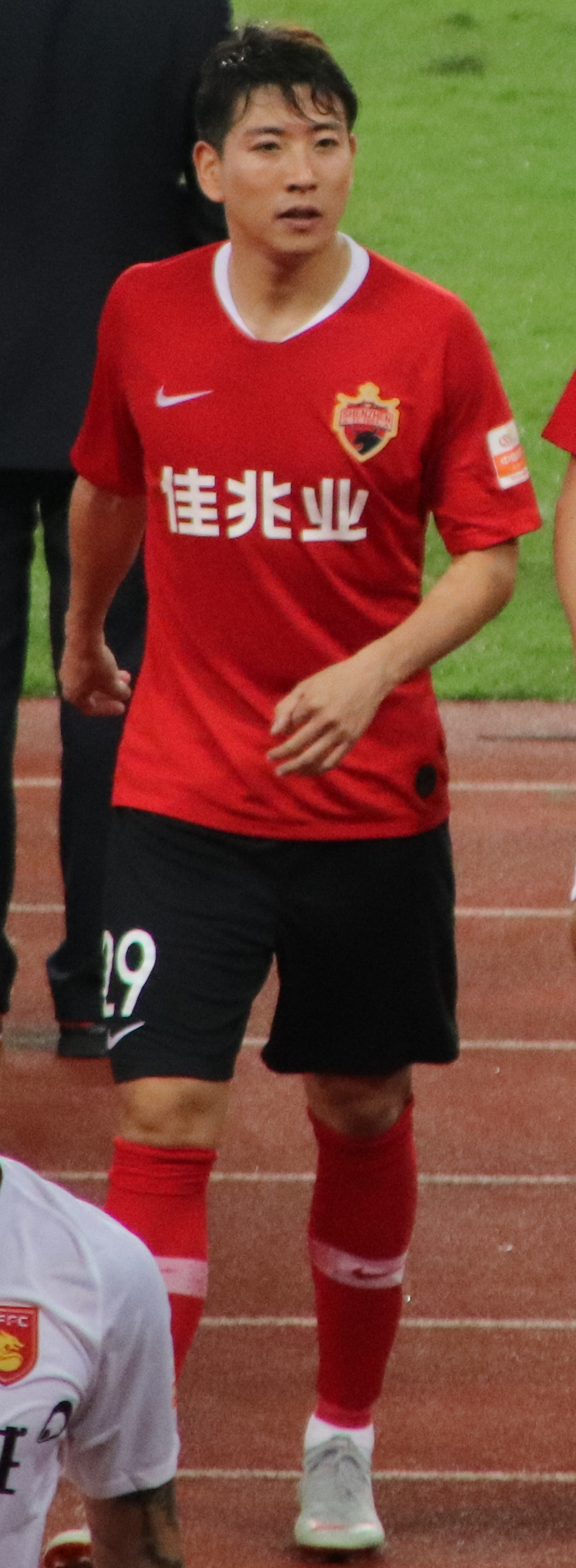

Personal information
- Date of birth: 11 March 1989 (age 37)
- Place of birth: Shenyang, Liaoning, China
- Height: 1.88 m (6 ft 2 in)
- Position: Defender

Youth career
- 2000-2006: Harbin Yiteng

Senior career*
Years	Team	Apps	(Gls)
2007–2017	Zhejiang Yiteng	147	(9)
2017–2021	Shenzhen FC	59	(4)
2020	→ Taizhou Yuanda (loan)	2	(0)
2021	Nanjing City	23	(0)
2022	Guangxi Pingguo Haliao	0	(0)
2022	Dalian Duxing	0	(0)
- * Club domestic league appearances and goals as of 18 May 2022

Wang Dalong (Chinese: 王大龙; born 11 March 1989) is a Chinese footballer who plays as a defender.

== Club career ==
Wang Dalong would play for the join Dalian Railway Yiteng youth team and remained with them as they moved to Harbin while the club renamed themselves Harbin Yiteng. In 2007, Wang Dalong would be promoted to the senior team and start his professional footballer career with Harbin Yiteng in the China League One. Unfortunately the following season, Wang was part of the squad that was relegated to the third-tier at the end of the 2008 China League One campaign.

In the 2011 China League Two campaign, Wang would go on to establish himself as an integral member of the team that won the division and promotion back into the second tier. This would be followed by another promotion when the club came runners-up of the 2013 China League One division and gain promotion to the top tier for the first time in the club's history. In the top tier, Wang would make his Chinese Super League debut for Harbin on 7 March 2014 in a game against Shandong Luneng Taishan that ended in a 1-0 defeat. After the game the team struggled within the league and were relegated at the end of the 2014 Chinese Super League season.

On 4 January 2017, Wang moved to fellow League One side Shenzhen FC. He would make his debut for the club on 12 March 2017 in a league game against Dalian Transcendence F.C. that ended in a 6-0 victory. The following season he would go on to aid the team gain promotion to the top tier when the club came runners-up within the league at the end of the 2018 China League One campaign.

In March 2020, Wang was loaned to China League one side Taizhou Yuanda. He would make his debut in a league game on 13 September 2020 against Suzhou Dongwu in a 1-0 victory.

== Career statistics ==
Statistics accurate as of match played 31 December 2020.

Appearances and goals by club, season and competition
Club	Season	League			National Cup		Continental		Other		Total	
Club	Season	Division	Apps	Goals	Apps	Goals	Apps	Goals	Apps	Goals	Apps	Goals
Harbin Yiteng	2007	China League One	1	0	-		-		-		1	0
Harbin Yiteng	2008	China League One	0	0	-		-		-		0	0
Harbin Yiteng	2009	China League Two			-		-		-			
Harbin Yiteng	2010	China League Two			-		-		-			
Harbin Yiteng	2011	China League Two	18	4	-		-		-		18	4
Harbin Yiteng	2012	China League One	27	1	1	0	-		-		28	1
Harbin Yiteng	2013	China League One	28	1	1	0	-		-		29	1
Harbin Yiteng	2014	Chinese Super League	26	0	0	0	-		-		26	0
Harbin Yiteng	2015	China League One	23	3	0	0	-		-		23	3
Harbin Yiteng	2016	China League One	24	0	0	0	-		-		24	0
Harbin Yiteng	Total		147	9	2	0	0	0	0	0	149	9
Shenzhen	2017	China League One	22	3	0	0	-		-		22	3
Shenzhen	2018	China League One	28	1	0	0	-		-		28	1
Shenzhen	2019	Chinese Super League	9	0	1	0	-		-		10	0
Shenzhen	Total		59	4	1	0	0	0	0	0	60	4
Taizhou Yuanda (loan)	2020	China League One	2	0	1	0	-		-		3	0
Career total			208	13	4	0	0	0	0	0	212	13

== Honours ==
=== Club ===
Harbin Yiteng

- China League Two: 2011
