= Zu Pengchao =

Chinese association football player

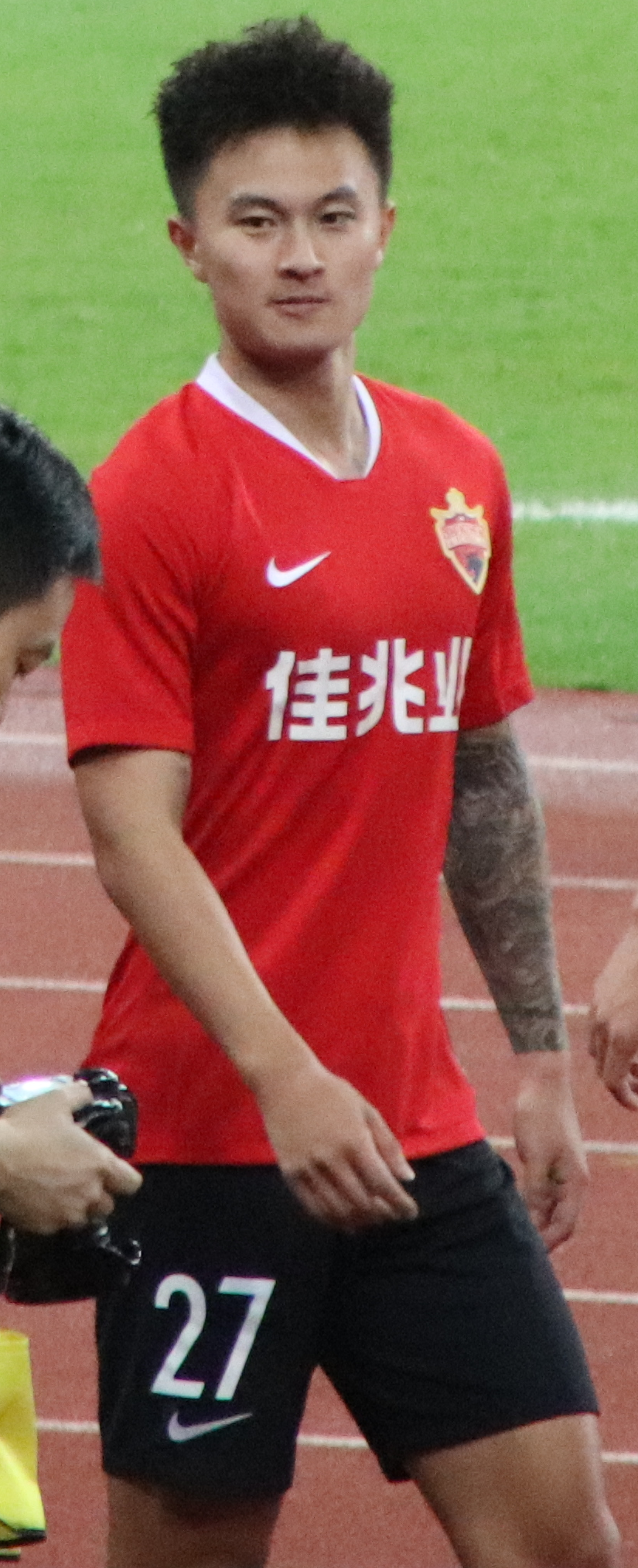

Personal information
- Date of birth: 11 January 1997 (age 29)
- Place of birth: Hangzhou, China
- Height: 1.82 m (6 ft 0 in)
- Position: Midfielder

Youth career
- –2014: Hangzhou Greentown
- 2015–2017: Shanghai Shenhua
- 2015: → C.F. Cracks (loan)
- 2015–2016: → Atlético Museros (loan)
- 2015–2016: → C.F. Cracks (loan)

Senior career*
Years	Team	Apps	(Gls)
2015–2016	Shanghai Shenhua	0	(0)
2015–2016	→ Atlético Museros (loan)	3	(0)
2017–2020	Shenzhen FC	49	(1)
2021	Hebei FC	0	(0)
2021	→ Shaanxi Chang'an Athletic (loan)	7	(0)
2022	Tianjin Jinmen Tiger	0	(0)
2022	→ Nanjing City (loan)	10	(1)
2023	Qingdao Red Lions	18	(2)
2024	Hunan Billows	21	(3)
2025	Shenzhen Juniors	3	(0)
2025	→ Hangzhou Linping Wuyue (loan)	14	(1)
- * Club domestic league appearances and goals as of 06:04, 12 April 2022 (UTC)

Zu Pengchao (simplified Chinese: 祖鹏超; traditional Chinese: 祖鵬超; pinyin: Zǔ Péngchāo; born 11 January 1997) is a Chinese footballer.

== Club career ==
Zu Pengchao would play for his local football club's Hangzhou Greentown youth team before representing the Zhejiang team in the U18 Men's 2013 National Games where his team came runners-up to Liaoning. He would sign for Shanghai Shenhua where he was sent to Spain to continue his football development until second tier football club Shenzhen FC signed him on 28 February 2017. He would be promoted to their senior team and would make his debut appearance on 12 March 2017 against Dalian Transcendence in a league game that ended in a 6-0 victory. He would gradually start to establish himself as a regular within the team and go on to gain promotion with the club at the end of the 2018 China League One campaign.

== Career statistics ==
=== Club ===
As of 31 December 2020.

Club	Season	League			Cup		Continental		Other		Total	
Club	Season	Division	Apps	Goals	Apps	Goals	Apps	Goals	Apps	Goals	Apps	Goals
Shanghai Shenhua	2015	Chinese Super League	0	0	0	0	0	0	0	0	0	0
Shanghai Shenhua	2016	Chinese Super League	0	0	0	0	0	0	0	0	0	0
Shanghai Shenhua	2017	Chinese Super League	0	0	0	0	0	0	0	0	0	0
Shanghai Shenhua	Total		0	0	0	0	0	0	0	0	0	0
Atlético Museros (loan)	2015–2016	Preferente Valenciana	3	0	0	0	–		0	0	3	0
Shenzhen FC	2017	China League One	17	0	0	0	–		0	0	17	0
Shenzhen FC	2018	China League One	18	1	1 (Note: Appearances in the Chinese FA Cup)	0	–		0	0	19	1
Shenzhen FC	2019	Chinese Super League	14	0	1	0	–		0	0	15	0
Shenzhen FC	Total		49	1	2	0	0	0	0	0	51	1
Career total			52	1	2	0	0	0	0	0	54	1
