= Lü Haidong =

Chinese association football player

Personal information
- Date of birth: 11 January 1992 (age 34)
- Place of birth: Fushun, Liaoning, China
- Height: 1.80 m (5 ft 11 in)
- Position: Left-back

Team information
- Current team: Guangdong GZ-Power
- Number: 32

Senior career*
Years	Team	Apps	(Gls)
2010	Shanghai East Asia	1	(0)
2011–2015	Chongqing Lifan	35	(1)
2016–2022	Shenzhen FC	48	(3)
2021	→ Wuhan Three Towns (loan)	24	(0)
2022–2023	Wuhan Three Towns	7	(0)
2024–	Guangdong GZ-Power	1	(0)
- * Club domestic league appearances and goals as of 14:01, 11 January 2023 (UTC)

Lü Haidong (simplified Chinese: 吕海东; traditional Chinese: 呂海東; pinyin: Lǚ Hǎidōng; born 11 January 1992) is a Chinese footballer who currently plays as a left-back for Guangdong GZ-Power.

== Club career ==
Lü Haidong would play for second-tier football club Shanghai East Asia before joining another second division club with Chongqing Lifan in the 2011 China League One season. He would go on to establish himself as regular within the team and in 2014 China League One he would win the division title with them. In the top tier he was unable to gain much playing time and was allowed to join second-tier football club Shenzhen at the start of the 2016 China League One season. He would gradually start to establish himself as a regular within the team and go on to gain promotion with the club at the end of the 2018 China League One campaign.

The following season, Lü would help the team avoid relegation, however the club would bring in Jiang Zhipeng as the club's first choice left-back. With limited playing time he would be loaned out to second tier club Wuhan Three Towns for the 2021 China League One campaign. The move would turn out to be a big successes and he would go on to establish himself as a vital member of the team and help aid the club to win the league title and gain promotion as the club entered the top tier for the first time in their history. The following campaign Wuhan would make the move permanent and he would be part of the squad that won the 2022 Chinese Super League title.

== Career statistics ==
As of 11 January 2023.

Club	Season	League			Cup		Continental		Other		Total	
Club	Season	Division	Apps	Goals	Apps	Goals	Apps	Goals	Apps	Goals	Apps	Goals
Shanghai East Asia	2010	China League One	1	0	–		–		–		1	0
Chongqing Lifan	2011	China League One	9	1	2	0	–		–		11	1
Chongqing Lifan	2012	China League One	12	0	0	0	–		–		12	0
Chongqing Lifan	2013	China League One	13	0	1	0	–		–		14	0
Chongqing Lifan	2014	China League One	1	0	0	0	–		–		1	0
Chongqing Lifan	2015	Chinese Super League	0	0	1	1	–		–		1	1
Chongqing Lifan	Total		35	1	4	1	0	0	0	0	39	2
Shenzhen	2016	China League One	7	0	0	0	–		–		7	0
Shenzhen	2017	China League One	2	0	2	0	–		–		4	0
Shenzhen	2018	China League One	22	3	1	0	–		–		23	3
Shenzhen	2019	Chinese Super League	17	0	0	0	–		–		17	0
Shenzhen	2020	Chinese Super League	0	0	0	0	–		–		0	0
Shenzhen	Total		48	3	3	1	0	0	0	0	51	4
Wuhan Three Towns (loan)	2021	China League One	24	0	1	0	-		-		25	0
Wuhan Three Towns	2022	Chinese Super League	5	0	1	0	-		-		6	0
Career total			113	4	9	2	0	0	0	0	122	6

== Honours ==
=== Club ===
Chongqing Lifan

- China League One: 2014

Wuhan Three Towns

- Chinese Super League: 2022
- China League One: 2021
- Chinese FA Super Cup: 2023
