= Li Shuai (footballer, born 1994) =

Chinese association football player

Personal information
- Date of birth: 19 May 1994 (age 32)
- Place of birth: Guiyang, Guizhou, China
- Height: 1.74 m (5 ft 9 in)
- Position: Midfielder

Youth career
- –2011: Shaanxi Renhe
- 2012: Porto (loan)

Senior career*
Years	Team	Apps	(Gls)
2011–2016	Shaanxi Renhe	0	(0)
2011–2012	→ Shaanxi Laochenggen (loan)	16	(1)
2014–2015	→ Yinchuan Helanshan (loan)	7	(1)
2015	→ Inner Mongolia Zhongyou (loan)	12	(2)
2016	→ Inner Mongolia Zhongyou (loan)	18	(0)
2017–2021	Heilongjiang Ice City	114	(13)
2022	Meizhou Hakka	13	(0)
2023	Yunnan Yukun	6	(0)
2023	Liaoning Shenyang Urban	7	(1)
- * Club domestic league appearances and goals as of 18 September 2023

Li Shuai (Chinese: 李帅; born 19 May 1994) is a Chinese former professional footballer who played as a midfielder.

== Club career ==
Li Shuai would play for the Shaanxi Renhe youth team before being loaned out to third tier football club Shaanxi Laochenggen. On his return he would be scouted by Portuguese football club Porto and was loaned out to their youth team. On his return from Portugal, Li Shuai was promoted to the senior team of Shaanxi Renhe (now renamed Guizhou Renhe), however he was unable to establish himself and he was loaned to third tier club Yinchuan Helanshan.

Li Shuai would join second tier football club Inner Mongolia Zhongyou during the 2015 China League One campaign on loan. On 14 March 2017 Li Shuai was allowed to leave on a free and joined third tier football club Heilongjiang Ice City. In his first season with the club he would quickly establish himself as a vital member of their team and go on to aid the club to the division title and promotion to the second tier.

On 22 March 2022, Li transferred to Chinese Super League club Meizhou Hakka. He would go on to make his debut in a league game on 4 June 2022 against Tianjin Jinmen Tiger in a 1-1 draw.

On 29 January 2026, Li was given a lifetime ban for match-fixing by the Chinese Football Association.

== Career statistics ==
As of 31 December 2022.

Club	Season	League			Cup		Continental		Other		Total	
Club	Season	Division	Apps	Goals	Apps	Goals	Apps	Goals	Apps	Goals	Apps	Goals
Shaanxi Renhe/ Guizhou Renhe/ Beijing Renhe	2011	Chinese Super League	0	0	0	0	–		–		0	0
Shaanxi Renhe/ Guizhou Renhe/ Beijing Renhe	2012	Chinese Super League	0	0	0	0	–		–		0	0
Shaanxi Renhe/ Guizhou Renhe/ Beijing Renhe	2013	Chinese Super League	0	0	0	0	0	0	–		0	0
Shaanxi Renhe/ Guizhou Renhe/ Beijing Renhe	2014	Chinese Super League	0	0	0	0	0	0	0 (Note: Appearances in Chinese FA Super Cup)	0	0	0
Shaanxi Renhe/ Guizhou Renhe/ Beijing Renhe	2015	Chinese Super League	0	0	0	0	–		–		0	0
Shaanxi Renhe/ Guizhou Renhe/ Beijing Renhe	2016	Chinese Super League	0	0	0	0	–		–		0	0
Shaanxi Renhe/ Guizhou Renhe/ Beijing Renhe	Total		0	0	0	0	0	0	0	0	0	0
Shaanxi Laochenggen (loan)	2011	China League Two	7	1	–		–		–		7	1
Shaanxi Laochenggen (loan)	2012	China League Two	9	0	1	0	–		–		10	0
Shaanxi Laochenggen (loan)	Total		16	1	1	0	0	0	0	0	17	1
Yinchuan Helanshan (loan)	2014	China League Two	0	0	0	0	–		–		0	0
Yinchuan Helanshan (loan)	2015	China League Two	7	1	0	0	–		–		7	1
Yinchuan Helanshan (loan)	Total		7	1	0	0	0	0	0	0	7	1
Inner Mongolia Zhongyou (loan)	2015	China League One	12	2	0	0	–		–		12	2
Inner Mongolia Zhongyou (loan)	2016	China League One	18	0	1	0	–		–		19	0
Inner Mongolia Zhongyou (loan)	Total		30	2	1	0	0	0	0	0	31	2
Heilongjiang Ice City	2017	China League Two	24	6	0	0	–		–		24	6
Heilongjiang Ice City	2018	China League One	27	0	0	0	–		–		27	0
Heilongjiang Ice City	2019	China League One	22	4	0	0	–		–		22	4
Heilongjiang Ice City	2020	China League One	14	0	0	0	–		2 (Note: Appearances in the China League One relegation play-offs)	2	16	2
Heilongjiang Ice City	2021	China League One	27	3	0	0	–		–		27	3
Heilongjiang Ice City	Total		114	13	0	0	0	0	2	2	116	15
Meizhou Hakka	2022	Chinese Super League	13	0	0	0	–		–		13	0
Career total			180	17	2	0	0	0	2	2	184	19

== Honours ==
=== Club ===
Heilongjiang Ice City

- China League Two: 2017

=== Individual ===
- China League Two Most valuable player: 2017
