= Bu Xin =

Chinese footballer

Bu Xin 卜鑫
Personal information
- Date of birth: 17 May 1987 (age 39)
- Place of birth: Tangshan, Hebei, China
- Height: 1.72 m (5 ft 7 1/2 in)
- Positions: Midfielder; left winger

Senior career*
Years	Team	Apps	(Gls)
2006–2011	Liaoning Whowin	5	(0)
2007	→ Liaoning Guangyuan (loan)		
2010	→ Liaoning Tiger (loan)		
2011	→ Harbin Yiteng (loan)	11	(1)
2012–2015	Harbin Yiteng	109	(31)
2016–2018	Beijing Enterprises Group	67	(9)
2019	Guangdong South China Tiger	28	(6)
2020–2022	Beijing BSU	36	(4)
2022	Heilongjiang Ice City	26	(4)
2023–2024	Shijiazhuang Gongfu	31	(3)
2024	→ Shanghai Jiading Huilong (loan)	14	(1)
2025	Shanghai Jiading Huilong	4	(0)
- * Club domestic league appearances and goals as of 25 April 2022

Bu Xin (Chinese: 卜鑫; born 17 May 1987) is a Chinese football player who plays as Midfielder.

== Club career ==
In 2006, Bu Xin started his professional footballer career with Liaoning Whowin in the Chinese Super League. In 2007, he moved to S. League side Liaoning Guangyuan on a one-year loan deal. He would eventually make his league debut for Liaoning on 10 May 2008 in a game against Beijing Guoan, coming on as a substitute for Yu Hanchao in the 60th minute in a 2-0 defeat. In 2010, he moved to China League Two side Liaoning Tiger on another one-year loan deal.

In 2011, he was loaned to China League Two side Harbin Yiteng until 31 December. In the 2011 China League Two campaign he would be part of the team that won the division and promotion into the second tier. After his successful loan with the club in March 2012, Bu transferred to China League One side Harbin Yiteng. He would go on to be a member of the squad as they moved up divisions and gained promotion to the Chinese Super League.

On 20 December 2015, Bu transferred to fellow China League One side Beijing Enterprises Group. On 13 February 2019, Bu transferred to China League One club Guangdong South China Tiger.

== Career statistics ==
Statistics accurate as of match played 31 December 2020.

Appearances and goals by club, season and competition
Club	Season	League			National Cup		League Cup		Continental		Total	
Club	Season	Division	Apps	Goals	Apps	Goals	Apps	Goals	Apps	Goals	Apps	Goals
Liaoning Whowin	2006	Chinese Super League	0	0	0	0	-		-		0	0
Liaoning Whowin	2008	Chinese Super League	5	0	-		-		-		5	0
Liaoning Whowin	2009	China League One	0	0	-		-		-		0	0
Liaoning Whowin	Total		5	0	0	0	0	0	0	0	5	0
Liaoning Guangyuan (loan)	2007	S. League							-			
Liaoning Tiger (loan)	2010	China League Two			-		-		-			
Harbin Yiteng (loan)	2011	China League Two	11	1	-		-		-		11	1
Harbin Yiteng	2012	China League One	28	10	1	0	-		-		29	10
Harbin Yiteng	2013	China League One	29	12	1	0	-		-		30	12
Harbin Yiteng	2014	Chinese Super League	25	3	0	0	-		-		25	3
Harbin Yiteng	2015	China League One	27	6	0	0	-		-		27	6
Harbin Yiteng	Total		109	31	2	0	0	0	0	0	111	31
Beijing Enterprises Group	2016	China League One	19	2	1	0	-		-		20	2
Beijing Enterprises Group	2017	China League One	25	4	1	0	-		-		26	4
Beijing Enterprises Group	2018	China League One	24	3	1	0	-		-		25	3
Beijing Enterprises Group	Total		68	9	3	0	0	0	0	0	71	9
Guangdong South China Tiger	2019	China League One	28	6	0	0	-		-		28	6
Beijing BSU	2020	China League One	8	0	-		-		-		8	0
Beijing BSU	2021	China League One	28	4	0	0	-		-		28	4
Beijing BSU	Total		36	4	0	0	0	0	0	0	36	4
Heilongjiang Ice City	2022	China League One	26	4	0	0	-		-		26	4
Shijiazhuang Gongfu	2023	China League One	0	0	0	0	-		-		0	0
Career total			273	55	5	0	0	0	0	0	288	55

== Honours ==
Harbin Yiteng

- China League Two: 2011
