= 2018 China League One =

China League One
- Season: 2018
- Champions: Wuhan Zall
- Promoted: Wuhan Zall; Shenzhen F.C.
- Relegated: Yanbian Funde; Zhejiang Yiteng; Dalian Transcendence
- Matches: 242
- Goals: 679 (2.81 per match)
- Top goalscorer: John Mary (24 goals)
- Biggest home win: Meizhou Meixian Techand 6–0 Liaoning F.C. (6 May 2018)
- Biggest away win: Xinjiang Tianshan Leopard 0–5 Wuhan Zall (1 September 2018)
- Highest scoring: Zhejiang Yiteng 5–3 Nei Mongol Zhongyou (19 September 2018)
- Longest winning run: 5 matches Meizhou Hakka
- Longest unbeaten run: 10 matches Wuhan Zall
- Longest winless run: 16 matches Xinjiang Tianshan Leopard
- Longest losing run: 6 matches Dalian Transcendence; Xinjiang Tianshan Leopard
- Highest attendance: 32,865; Heilongjiang Lava Spring 1–1 Zhejiang Yiteng (20 October 2018)
- Lowest attendance: 371; Xinjiang Tianshan Leopard 1–5 Zhejiang Greentown (7 October 2018)
- Average attendance: 6,084 (excluding games: Liaoning F.C. vs Nei Mongol Zhengyou on Sept. 26th, 2018)

The 2018 China League One (Chinese: 58同城 2018中国足球协会甲级联赛) was the 15th season of the China League One, the second tier of the Chinese football league pyramid, since its establishment in 2004. The league's title sponsor is the e-commerce website 58.com. Dalian Transcendence, Heilongjiang Lava Spring, Meizhou Hakka, Meizhou Meixian Techand and Nei Mongol Zhongyou failed to submit the application for the Chinese Super League before deadline, thus ineligible for promotion.

== Teams ==
A total of 16 teams are contesting in the league, including 12 sides from the 2017 season, two relegated from the 2017 Chinese Super League and two promoted from the 2017 China League Two.

=== Team changes ===
==== To League One ====
Teams relegated from 2017 Chinese Super League

- Yanbian Funde
- Liaoning F.C.

Teams promoted from 2017 China League Two

- Heilongjiang Lava Spring
- Meizhou Meixian Techand

==== From League One ====
Teams promoted to 2018 Chinese Super League

- Dalian Yifang
- Beijing Renhe

Teams relegated to 2018 China League Two

- Baoding Yingli ETS
- Yunnan Lijiang

=== Name changes ===
- Hangzhou Greentown F.C. changed their name to Zhejiang Greentown F.C. in January 2018.

== Clubs ==
=== Stadiums and Locations ===
Club	Head coach	City	Stadium	Capacity	2017 season
Yanbian Funde ^{R}	(China) Zhao Zhonghe (caretaker)	Yanji	Yanji Nationwide Fitness Centre Stadium	30,000	CSL, 15th
Liaoning F.C. ^{R}	(China) Chen Yang	Shenyang	Tiexi New District Sports Center	30,000	CSL, 16th
Shijiazhuang Ever Bright	(Bulgaria) Yasen Petrov	Shijiazhuang	Yutong International Sports Center	29,000	3rd
Shijiazhuang Ever Bright	(Bulgaria) Yasen Petrov	Shijiazhuang	Hebei Olympic Sports Center	60,000	3rd
Shijiazhuang Ever Bright	(Bulgaria) Yasen Petrov	Qinhuangdao	Qinhuangdao Olympic Sports Center Stadium	33,572	3rd
Qingdao Huanghai	(Spain) Jordi Vinyals	Qingdao	Qingdao Guoxin Stadium	45,000	4th
Wuhan Zall	(China) Li Tie	Wuhan	Zhongnan University of Economics and Law Stadium	30,000	5th
Wuhan Zall	(China) Li Tie	Wuhan	Xinhua Road Sports Center	22,140	5th
Shenzhen F.C.	(Spain) Juan Ramón López Caro	Shenzhen	Shenzhen Stadium	32,500	6th
Shanghai Shenxin	(China) Zhu Jiong	Shanghai	Jinshan Football Stadium	30,000	7th
Beijing Enterprises Group	(China) Gao Hongbo	Beijing	Olympic Sports Centre (Beijing)	36,228	8th
Zhejiang Greentown	(Spain) Sergi Barjuán	Hangzhou	Yellow Dragon Sports Center	52,672	9th
Nei Mongol Zhongyou	(China) Wang Bo	Hohhot	Hohhot City Stadium	60,000	10th
Xinjiang Tianshan Leopard	(China) Li Jun	Ürümqi	Hongshan Stadium	10,000	11th
Meizhou Hakka	(China) Li Weijun (caretaker)	Wuhua	Wuhua County Stadium	15,000	12th
Zhejiang Yiteng	(China) Hu Zhaojun (caretaker)	Shaoxing	China Textile City Sports Center	40,000	13th
Dalian Transcendence	(Bosnia and Herzegovina) Dželaludin Muharemović	Dalian	Jinzhou Stadium	30,776	14th
Heilongjiang Lava Spring ^{P}	(China) Duan Xin	Harbin	Harbin ICE Sports Center	50,000	CL2, 1st
Meizhou Meixian Techand ^{P}	(China) Fu Bo	Meizhou	Meixian Tsang Hin-chi Stadium	20,221	CL2, 2nd

Location of teams in 2018 China League One

=== Managerial changes ===
Team	Outgoing manager	Manner of departure	Date of vacancy	Position in table	Incoming manager	Date of appointment
Wuhan Zall	(China) Chen Yang	Mutual consent	10 November 2017	Pre-season	(China) Li Tie	16 November 2017
Zhejiang Greentown	(Bulgaria) Zdravko Zdravkov (caretaker)	End of caretaker spell	26 November 2017	Pre-season	(Spain) Sergi Barjuán	26 November 2017
Shanghai Shenxin	(Spain) Juan Ignacio Martínez	Mutual consent	28 November 2017	Pre-season	(China) Zhu Jiong	3 December 2017
Liaoning F.C.	(China) Zhao Junzhe (caretaker)	End of caretaker spell	12 December 2017	Pre-season	(China) Chen Yang	12 December 2017
Nei Mongol Zhongyou	(China) Wang Bo	End of contract	14 December 2017	Pre-season	(Spain) Raül Agné	21 December 2017
Meizhou Hakka	(Bulgaria) Aleksandar Stankov	End of contract	17 December 2017	Pre-season	(Bosnia and Herzegovina) Rusmir Cviko	17 December 2017
Zhejiang Yiteng	(Croatia) Marijo Tot	End of contract	31 December 2017	Pre-season	(Brazil) Maurício Copertino	2 January 2018
Meizhou Meixian Techand	(Hong Kong) Li Haiqiang	Appointed as assistant coach	2 January 2018	Pre-season	(Spain) Juan Ignacio Martínez	2 January 2018
Dalian Transcendence	(China) Li Guoxu	Sacked	11 April 2018	16th	(Bosnia and Herzegovina) Dželaludin Muharemović	11 April 2018
Shenzhen F.C.	(China) Wang Baoshan	Sacked	11 April 2018	10th	(Spain) Juan Ramón López Caro	11 April 2018
Nei Mongol Zhongyou	(Spain) Raül Agné	Sacked	9 August 2018	15th	(China) Wang Bo	9 August 2018
Meizhou Hakka	(Bosnia and Herzegovina) Rusmir Cviko	Resigned	28 August 2018	5th	(China) Li Weijun (caretaker)	28 August 2018
Shijiazhuang Ever Bright	(Iran) Afshin Ghotbi	Mutual consent	3 September 2018	5th	(Bulgaria) Yasen Petrov	8 September 2018
Meizhou Meixian Techand	(Spain) Juan Ignacio Martínez	Sacked	23 September 2018	14th	(Hong Kong) Poon Man Chun (caretaker)	23 September 2018
Zhejiang Yiteng	(Brazil) Maurício Copertino	Sacked	24 September 2018	6th	(China) Hu Zhaojun (caretaker)^{1}	29 September 2018
Meizhou Meixian Techand	(Hong Kong) Poon Man Chun (caretaker)	End of caretaker spell	26 September 2018	14th	(China) Fu Bo	26 September 2018
Yanbian Funde	(South Korea) Park Tae-ha	Sacked	26 October 2018	12th	(China) Zhao Zhonghe (caretaker)	26 October 2018

- ^1 Zhejiang Yiteng didn't appoint a new manager after Maurício Copertino's departure. Team leader Hu Zhaojun took charge of the club in fact.

== Foreign players ==
A total of four foreign players can be registered in a season; however, the number of foreign players is limited to three per CL1 team in the same time. Maximum of two foreign players can be fielded in one match.

Players name in bold indicates the player is registered during the mid-season transfer window.

Club	Player 1	Player 2	Player 3	Hong Kong/Macau/ Taiwan Player ^{1}	Former players ^{2}
Beijing Enterprises Group	(Ivory Coast) Gerard Gohou	(Nigeria) Dominic Vinicius		(Chinese Taipei) Wen Chih-hao	(Chinese Taipei) Chen Hao-wei
Dalian Transcendence	(Bosnia and Herzegovina) Eldar Hasanović	(Brazil) Rafael Silva	(Montenegro) **Admir Adrović**		(Cameroon) Yves Ekwalla Herman
Heilongjiang Lava Spring	(Brazil) Victor Bolt	(Brazil) **Cassiano**	(Senegal) Babacar Gueye		(Kenya) Ayub Masika
Liaoning F.C.	(Brazil) **Gustavo Vagenin**	(Democratic Republic of the Congo) Assani Lukimya	(Zambia) Jacob Mulenga	(Hong Kong) Andy Russell	(Zambia) James Chamanga
Meizhou Hakka	(Cameroon) John Mary	(Ivory Coast) Serges Déblé	(Nigeria) Izunna Uzochukwu	(Hong Kong) Tsui Wang Kit	
Meizhou Meixian Techand	(Brazil) Aloísio	(Brazil) **Denílson Gabionetta**	(Brazil) Muriqui		(Spain) Raúl Rodríguez
Nei Mongol Zhongyou	(Brazil) Dori	(Senegal) André Senghor			(Spain) Martí Crespí
Qingdao Huanghai	(Brazil) **Cléo**	(Spain) Francisco Sandaza	(Spain) Joan Verdú	(Chinese Taipei) Yaki Yen	
Shanghai Shenxin	(Brazil) Biro-Biro	(Brazil) Johnny	(Nigeria) John Owoeri		
Shenzhen F.C.	(Cameroon) Franck Ohandza	(Colombia) Harold Preciado	(The Gambia) **Pa Dibba**		(Cameroon) Aboubakar Oumarou
Shijiazhuang Ever Bright	(Brazil) Matheus	(Serbia) Alen Melunović	(Venezuela) **Mario Rondón**		(Democratic Republic of the Congo) Junior Mapuku
Wuhan Zall	(Brazil) **Pedro Junior**	(Brazil) Rafael Silva	(Ivory Coast) Jean Evrard Kouassi		(Bolivia) Marcelo Moreno
Xinjiang Tianshan Leopard	(Ivory Coast) Kobena Amed	(Spain) **José Antonio Reyes**	(Venezuela) Jacobo Kouffati	(Hong Kong) **Paul Ngue**	(Montenegro) Petar Orlandić
Yanbian Funde	(Cameroon) Raphaël Messi Bouli	(Democratic Republic of the Congo) **Oscar Maritu**	(Hungary) Richárd Guzmics	(Hong Kong) **Alex Tayo Akande**	(Brazil) Jair
Zhejiang Greentown	(Brazil) **Rafael Martins**	(South Africa) Dino Ndlovu	(Spain) Edu García	(Chinese Taipei) Chen Po-liang	(Serbia) Đorđe Rakić
Zhejiang Yiteng	(Brazil) Guto	(Brazil) Sérgio Mota	(Brazil) **Rodrigo Paulista**		(Australia) Adam Hughes

- **^1** A club could register one non-naturalized player from the Hong Kong Football Association, Macau Football Association or Chinese Taipei Football Association as native player. For special, Beijing Enterprises could register both Chen Hao-wei and Wen Chih-hao as native player before their current contracts end.
- **^2** Foreign players who left their clubs or were sent to reserve team after the first half of the season.

== League table ==
Pos	Team	Pld	W	D	L	GF	GA	GD	Pts	Promotion, qualification or relegation
1	Wuhan Zall (C, P)	30	18	9	3	60	25	+35	63	Promotion to Super League
2	Shenzhen F.C. (P)	30	15	8	7	57	34	+23	53	Promotion to Super League
3	Zhejiang Greentown	30	14	9	7	53	38	+15	51	
4	Qingdao Huanghai	30	13	10	7	63	44	+19	49	
5	Beijing Enterprises Group	30	12	11	7	43	34	+9	47	
6	Shijiazhuang Ever Bright	30	12	9	9	43	38	+5	45	
7	Heilongjiang Lava Spring (Note: Ineligible for promotion.)	30	10	11	9	37	33	+4	41 (Note: Heilongjiang Lava Spring is ahead of Liaoning on head-to-head points: Heilongjiang Lava Spring 2–0 Liaoning, Liaoning 2–1 Heilongjiang Lava Spring.)	
8	Liaoning F.C.	30	11	8	11	35	44	−9	41	
9	Meizhou Hakka	30	11	7	12	40	43	−3	40	
10	Yanbian Funde (Note: Yanbian Funde was disqualified by CFA and was dissolved due to tax owed.) (R, D, R)	30	11	5	14	34	36	−2	38	Disbanded after season
11	Shanghai Shenxin	30	11	4	15	37	45	−8	37 (Note: Shanghai Shenxin is ahead of Zhejiang Yiteng on head-to-head points: Shanghai Shenxin 1–0 Zhejiang Yiteng, Zhejiang Yiteng 0–1 Shanghai Shenxin.)	
12	Zhejiang Yiteng (D, R)	30	10	7	13	43	53	−10	37	Relegation to League Two
13	Nei Mongol Zhongyou	30	10	4	16	36	54	−18	34 (Note: Nei Mongol Zhongyou is ahead of Meizhou Meixian Techand on head-to-head points: Nei Mongol Zhongyou 1–0 Meizhou Meixian Techand, Meizhou Meixian Techand 1–3 Nei Mongol Zhongyou.)	
14	Meizhou Meixian Techand (O)	30	8	10	12	41	44	−3	34	Qualification to Relegation play-offs
15	Dalian Transcendence (Note: Dalian Transcendence was ineligible for promotion. And Dalian was dissolved after failing to submit the salary & bonus confirmation form.) (R, D)	30	7	7	16	28	48	−20	28	Disbanded after season
16	Xinjiang Tianshan Leopard	30	3	9	18	24	61	−37	18	

Source: League table
Rules for classification: 1) Points; 2) Head-to-head points; 3) Head-to-head goal difference; 4) Head-to-head goals scored; 5) Reserve league points; 6) Goal difference; 7) Goals scored; 8) Disciplinary points (1 point for each yellow card, 3 points for each red card); 9) Draw
(C) Champions; (D) Disqualified; (O) Play-off winners; (P) Promoted; (R) Relegated

== Results ==
Home \ Away	BG	DLT	HLJ	LN	MZK	MXT	NMZ	QDH	SHS	SZ	SJZ	WH	XJT	YB	ZJG	ZJY
Beijing Enterprises Group	—	1–2	2–0	0–1	0–0	2–1	1–0	3–2	2–0	1–1	2–0	1–1	1–0	2–3	1–1	3–0
Dalian Transcendence	0–2	—	1–0	0–1	2–1	2–2	0–0	2–2	1–0	1–1	0–2	2–2	2–1	0–1	1–3	2–0
Heilongjiang Lava Spring	0–0	0–0	—	1–2	3–0	1–2	2–0	1–1	2–1	1–0	2–2	0–0	3–1	2–0	1–2	1–1
Liaoning F.C.	1–0	1–0	0–2	—	1–1	1–2	3–2	2–2	1–0	0–1	2–1	0–2	2–0	1–0	1–2	1–0
Meizhou Hakka	1–0	2–1	1–2	1–1	—	2–1	3–1	3–3	2–1	1–3	1–0	0–0	3–0	1–0	2–1	3–0
Meizhou Meixian Techand	1–1	3–1	0–0	6–0	1–1	—	1–3	1–3	1–0	2–2	0–0	1–0	0–0	0–1	1–2	4–2
Nei Mongol Zhongyou	2–2	1–2	0–0	1–0	2–1	1–0	—	0–4	1–0	2–1	1–2	0–3	3–2	1–0	2–1	1–2
Qingdao Huanghai	2–0	4–2	3–0	2–1	2–1	5–1	2–2	—	1–0	0–1	1–2	1–1	4–1	2–1	1–4	1–1
Shanghai Shenxin	2–3	1–0	2–1	4–3	1–2	3–2	2–1	3–3	—	0–3	1–1	0–1	2–0	1–1	1–3	1–0
Shenzhen F.C.	1–2	3–1	2–2	3–3	4–1	0–0	3–2	2–1	3–1	—	4–1	3–2	0–0	2–1	1–2	5–0
Shijiazhuang Ever Bright	1–1	1–0	1–1	2–2	2–1	1–2	3–0	3–3	2–3	1–0	—	1–2	3–1	2–1	0–0	1–1
Wuhan Zall	3–3	3–0	0–1	4–0	3–1	2–2	5–0	1–0	2–1	2–1	2–0	—	3–0	1–0	1–0	2–1
Xinjiang Tianshan Leopard	1–1	2–2	2–2	0–0	3–2	2–1	1–4	0–0	0–1	1–4	1–3	0–5	—	0–2	1–5	4–2
Yanbian Funde	4–1	1–0	2–3	2–1	2–1	2–0	1–0	2–3	0–0	1–2	0–3	2–2	0–0	—	1–2	1–0
Zhejiang Greentown	2–2	4–0	2–1	2–2	0–0	1–0	2–0	1–4	3–4	1–1	0–2	2–2	0–0	2–1	—	2–2
Zhejiang Yiteng	1–3	3–1	3–2	1–1	3–1	3–3	5–3	2–1	0–1	1–0	3–0	2–3	1–0	1–1	2–1	—

Legend: Blue = home team win; Yellow = draw; Red = away team win.

== Positions by round ==
To preserve chronological evolvements, any postponed matches are not included to the round at which they were originally scheduled, but added to the full round they were played immediately afterwards. For example, if a match is scheduled for round 7, but then played between rounds 8 and 9, it will be added to the standings for round 8.

Team ╲ Round	1	2	3	4	5	6	7	8	9	10	11	12	13	14	15	16	17	18	19	20	21	22	23	24	25	26	27	28	29	30
Wuhan Zall	7	4	5	2	2	2	1	2	2	1	1	1	1	1	1	1	1	1	1	1	1	1	1	1	1	1	1	1	1	1
Shenzhen F.C.	9	6	8	9	10	9	9	8	6	4	4	4	3	2	2	4	6	5	4	4	3	3	3	3	3	3	3	3	3	2
Zhejiang Greentown	3	1	2	7	7	4	5	4	5	3	3	3	4	3	3	3	2	2	2	2	2	2	2	2	2	2	2	2	2	3
Qingdao Huanghai	2	5	7	5	4	7	3	3	3	5	6	5	7	7	6	6	5	6	6	6	6	5	6	4	4	4	4	4	4	4
Beijing Enterprises Group	1	2	4	4	1	1	6	5	4	7	8	9	10	12	12	11	9	12	12	12	13	9	10	8	9	6	6	6	6	5
Shijiazhuang Ever Bright	5	3	1	1	3	5	4	6	7	10	10	7	5	5	5	5	4	4	5	5	4	6	4	7	7	5	5	5	5	6
Heilongjiang Lava Spring	8	12	11	11	13	14	11	12	10	9	9	10	11	10	11	9	8	9	9	9	10	7	8	9	10	12	12	11	8	7
Liaoning F.C.	4	7	3	8	9	10	12	11	12	12	12	13	12	11	10	8	7	7	7	7	9	8	11	11	12	10	9	7	7	8
Meizhou Hakka	10	8	10	6	6	3	2	1	1	2	2	2	2	4	4	2	3	3	3	3	5	4	5	6	5	7	7	8	9	9
Yanbian Funde	6	9	6	3	5	6	7	9	11	11	11	11	13	13	13	13	10	10	10	10	7	11	9	10	8	8	10	12	12	10
Shanghai Shenxin	11	10	9	10	8	8	8	7	9	6	5	6	6	6	7	7	11	11	11	11	11	13	14	13	11	11	8	9	10	11
Zhejiang Yiteng	16	14	12	12	12	12	14	14	13	13	14	12	9	9	8	10	12	8	8	8	8	10	7	5	6	9	11	10	11	12
Nei Mongol Zhongyou	15	16	15	13	14	11	13	13	15	15	15	15	15	15	15	15	15	15	14	13	12	12	12	12	13	13	13	13	13	13
Meizhou Meixian Techand	12	11	13	14	11	13	10	10	8	8	7	8	8	8	9	12	13	13	13	14	14	14	13	14	14	14	14	14	14	14
Dalian Transcendence	13	15	16	16	16	16	15	15	14	14	13	14	14	14	14	14	14	14	15	15	15	15	15	15	15	15	15	15	15	15
Xinjiang Tianshan Leopard	14	13	14	15	15	15	16	16	16	16	16	16	16	16	16	16	16	16	16	16	16	16	16	16	16	16	16	16	16	16

Leader and promotion to Super League
Runner-up and promotion to Super League
Qualification to Relegation play-offs
Relegation to League Two
Disbanded after season

== Results by match played ==
Team ╲ Round	1	2	3	4	5	6	7	8	9	10	11	12	13	14	15	16	17	18	19	20	21	22	23	24	25	26	27	28	29	30
Beijing Enterprises Group	W	W	L	W	W	D	L	D	D	L	D	L	D	L	W	W	D	L	D	D	D	W	D	W	L	W	D	W	W	W
Dalian Transcendence	L	L	L	L	L	L	W	D	W	L	W	L	D	W	D	D	L	L	L	D	W	D	W	L	W	D	L	L	L	L
Heilongjiang Lava Spring	D	L	W	L	L	D	W	L	W	W	L	W	L	D	L	W	D	D	D	L	D	W	D	W	D	D	L	D	W	W
Liaoning F.C.	W	L	W	L	L	L	D	W	L	D	L	W	L	W	W	D	D	W	L	D	D	W	L	L	D	W	W	W	D	L
Meizhou Hakka	L	W	D	W	W	W	W	W	L	D	L	W	D	D	D	W	L	W	L	L	L	W	L	L	D	L	D	L	L	W
Meizhou Meixian Techand	L	D	D	L	W	L	W	W	W	D	D	W	L	L	D	L	L	L	L	D	W	D	D	W	D	L	D	L	L	W
Nei Mongol Zhongyou	L	L	L	W	L	W	L	L	L	L	W	L	D	L	L	W	L	W	W	W	W	D	W	L	D	L	W	L	L	D
Qingdao Huanghai	W	D	D	W	W	L	W	D	D	L	D	W	W	D	W	D	W	L	D	D	L	L	L	W	W	L	W	W	W	D
Shanghai Shenxin	L	D	W	D	D	W	L	W	L	W	W	L	W	L	L	L	L	L	W	D	L	L	L	W	W	W	W	L	L	L
Shenzhen F.C.	D	W	D	L	L	W	D	W	W	D	W	W	D	W	L	L	D	W	D	W	W	L	L	W	D	W	L	W	W	W
Shijiazhuang Ever Bright	W	W	W	D	D	D	D	L	D	L	D	W	W	W	D	L	W	W	L	L	D	L	W	L	L	W	D	W	W	L
Wuhan Zall	W	W	L	W	W	D	W	D	D	W	W	L	D	W	D	W	W	D	W	L	D	W	W	W	W	D	D	W	W	W
Xinjiang Tianshan Leopard	L	D	D	L	L	L	L	D	D	L	D	L	L	D	D	D	W	L	W	D	L	L	L	L	L	L	W	L	L	L
Yanbian Funde	W	L	W	W	D	D	L	L	L	W	L	L	L	L	D	W	W	L	W	D	W	L	W	L	W	D	L	L	L	W
Zhejiang Greentown	W	W	L	L	W	W	D	D	D	W	D	L	W	W	D	L	W	W	D	W	D	W	D	L	L	W	D	W	W	L
Zhejiang Yiteng	L	L	D	W	D	D	L	L	W	W	L	W	W	L	W	L	L	W	D	W	L	D	W	W	L	L	L	D	D	L

W = Win; D = Draw; L = Loss

== Relegation play-offs ==
=== First leg ===
7 November 2018
15:00

Shaanxi Chang'an Athletic	1–1	Meizhou Meixian Techand
Zou You 45+2' (pen.)		Zeng Chao 17'

Shaanxi Province Stadium, Xi'an
Attendance: 25,897
Referee: Shi Zhenlu

=== Second leg ===
11 November 2018
16:00

Meizhou Meixian Techand	2–1 (a.e.t.)	Shaanxi Chang'an Athletic
Shen Feng 2'; Ye Weichao 94'		Yang He 32'

Meixian Tsang Hin-chi Stadium, Meizhou
Attendance: 15,686
Referee: Ma Ning

Meizhou Meixian Techand won 3–2 on aggregate and therefore both clubs remain in their respective leagues.

== Goalscorers ==
=== Top scorers ===
Rank	Player	Club	Total
1	(Cameroon) John Mary	Meizhou Hakka	24
2	(Colombia) Harold Preciado	Shenzhen F.C.	23
3	(Brazil) Rafael Silva	Wuhan Zall	22
4	(Senegal) André Senghor	Nei Mongol Zhongyou	20
5	(South Africa) Dino Ndlovu	Zhejiang Greentown	19
6	(Cameroon) Franck Ohandza	Shenzhen F.C.	18
7	(Spain) Joan Verdú	Qingdao Huanghai	16
7	(Brazil) Muriqui	Meizhou Meixian Techand	16
7	(Ivory Coast) Jean Evrard Kouassi	Wuhan Zall	16
10	(Nigeria) Dominic Vinicius	Beijing Enterprises Group	15
10	(Brazil) Sérgio Mota	Zhejiang Yiteng	15
12	(Zambia) Jacob Mulenga	Liaoning F.C.	14
12	(Senegal) Babacar Gueye	Heilongjiang Lava Spring	14
12	(Brazil) Matheus	Shijiazhuang Ever Bright	14
15	(Brazil) Aloísio	Meizhou Meixian Techand	12
16	(Brazil) Guto	Zhejiang Yiteng	11
16	(Brazil) Cléo	Qingdao Huanghai	11
18	(Serbia) Alen Melunović	Shijiazhuang Ever Bright	10
18	(Democratic Republic of the Congo) Taty Oscar	Yanbian Funde	10
18	(Ivory Coast) Gerard Gohou	Beijing Enterprises Group	10
18	(Brazil) Rafael Martins	Zhejiang Greentown	10
22	(Brazil) Rafael Silva	Dalian Transcendence	9
22	(Nigeria) John Owoeri	Shanghai Shenxin	9
22	(China) Gao Xiang	Qingdao Huanghai	9
25	(China) Wu Yizhen	Shanghai Shenxin	8
25	(Brazil) Victor Bolt	Heilongjiang Lava Spring	8
25	(China) Wang Jianwen	Beijing Enterprises Group	8
25	(China) Cui Ren	Yanbian Funde	8
29	(Spain) Dori	Nei Mongol Zhongyou	7
30	(China) Sabit Abdusalam	Xinjiang Tianshan Leopard	6
30	(China) Xu Junmin	Shanghai Shenxin	6
30	(China) Liu Xuanchen	Xinjiang Tianshan Leopard	6
30	(Brazil) Pedro Junior	Wuhan Zall	6
34	(Brazil) Biro Biro	Shanghai Shenxin	5
34	(Spain) Francisco Sandaza	Qingdao Huanghai	5
34	(Ivory Coast) Serges Déblé	Meizhou Hakka	5
34	(China) Ji Xiaoxuan	Zhejiang Yiteng	5
34	(Brazil) Gustavo Vagenin	Liaoning F.C.	5
34	(China) Wang Dong	Qingdao Huanghai	5
40	(Chinese Taipei) Chen Po-liang	Zhejiang Greentown	4
40	(China) Wang Peng	Shijiazhuang Ever Bright	4
40	(China) Yin Lu	Dalian Transcendence	4
40	(Spain) José Antonio Reyes	Xinjiang Tianshan Leopard	4
40	(China) Ye Chugui	Shenzhen F.C.	4
40	(Hong Kong) Andy Russell	Liaoning F.C.	4
40	(Chinese Taipei) Yaki Yen	Qingdao Huanghai	4

Last updated: 3 November 2018

=== Hat-tricks ===
Player	For	Against	Result	Date	Ref
(Brazil) Aloísio	Meizhou Meixian Techand	Dalian Transcendence	3–1	7 April 2018	
(Brazil) Muriqui	Meizhou Meixian Techand	Zhejiang Yiteng	4–2	22 April 2018	
(Colombia) Harold Preciado^{4}	Shenzhen F.C.	Shijiazhuang Ever Bright	4–1	29 April 2018	
(Senegal) Babacar Gueye	Heilongjiang Lava Spring	Meizhou Hakka	3–0	5 May 2018	
(China) Cui Ren	Yanbian Funde	Beijing Enterprises Group	3–2	9 May 2018	
(Cameroon) Franck Ohandza	Shenzhen F.C.	Meizhou Hakka	4–1	13 May 2018	
(Cameroon) John Mary	Meizhou Hakka	Qingdao Huanghai	3–3	18 July 2018	
(Senegal) André Senghor	Nei Mongol Zhongyou	Xinjiang Tianshan Leopard	3–2	25 August 2018	
(Ivory Coast) Jean Evrard Kouassi	Wuhan Zall	Xinjiang Tianshan Leopard	5–0	1 September 2018	
(Spain) Joan Verdú	Qingdao Huanghai	Zhejiang Greentown	4–1	22 September 2018	
(Democratic Republic of the Congo) Taty Oscar	Yanbian Funde	Beijing Enterprises Group	4–1	23 September 2018	
(Brazil) Rafael Martins	Zhejiang Greentown	Xinjiang Tianshan Leopard	5–1	29 September 2018	
(China) Liu Xuanchen	Xinjiang Tianshan Leopard	Zhejiang Yiteng	4–2	7 October 2018	
(Brazil) Rafael Silva	Wuhan Zall	Meizhou Hakka	3–1	20 October 2018	
(Senegal) Babacar Gueye	Heilongjiang Lava Spring	Xinjiang Tianshan Leopard	3–1	28 October 2018	

== Awards ==
The awards of 2018 China League One were announced on 15 November 2018.

Award	Winner	Club
Player of the Season	(China) Ji Xiaoxuan	Zhejiang Yiteng
Golden Boot	(Cameroon) John Mary	Meizhou Hakka
Golden Boot (Domestic Player)	(China) Gao Xiang	Qingdao Huanghai
Manager of the Season	(China) Li Tie	Wuhan Zall
Goalkeeper of the Season	(China) Mou Pengfei	Heilongjiang Lava Spring
Young Player of the Season	(China) Zhang Hongjiang	Meizhou Hakka
Fair Play Award	Beijing Enterprises Group, Shenzhen F.C., Wuhan Zall	—
Best Referee	(China) Zhen Wei	—
Best Assistant Referee	(China) Zhang Zhe	—
Most Popular Player	(China) Mou Pengfei	Heilongjiang Lava Spring

== League attendance ==
Pos	Team	Total	High	Low	Average	Change
1	Heilongjiang Lava Spring^{††}	203,223	32,865	6,957	13,548	+1.8%
2	Shijiazhuang Ever Bright	186,076	17,213	2,963	12,405	−23.5%
3	Yanbian Funde^{†}	147,791	16,741	2,576	9,853	−45.4%
4	Zhejiang Greentown	130,754	17,581	5,124	8,717	+78.6%
5	Shenzhen F.C.	112,609	20,188	3,473	7,507	−41.2%
6	Wuhan Zall	103,259	10,817	3,527	6,884	−46.5%
7	Qingdao Huanghai	99,570	13,820	2,132	6,638	+14.3%
8	Meizhou Meixian Techand^{††}	98,253	14,885	4,326	6,550	+64.4%
9	Nei Mongol Zhongyou	83,614	7,861	3,123	5,574	−27.2%
10	Liaoning F.C.^{†}	56,529	7,271	1,256	4,038	−67.5%
11	Zhejiang Yiteng	55,955	10,076	1,896	3,730	−6.9%
12	Shanghai Shenxin	55,419	8,260	902	3,695	−26.6%
13	Meizhou Hakka	53,744	4,680	2,180	3,583	−38.9%
14	Beijing Enterprises Group	31,240	5,103	617	2,083	−60.1%
15	Dalian Transcendence	18,134	1,679	819	1,209	−58.1%
16	Xinjiang Tianshan Leopard	17,810	2,307	371	1,187	−51.6%
	League total	1,453,980	32,865	371	6,084	−21.4%

Updated to games played on Mar. 1st, 2019 (excluding games: Liaoning F.C. vs Nei Mongol Zhengyou on Sept. 26th, 2018)
Notes:
^{†} Teams played previous season in CSL.
^{††} Teams played previous season in CL2.
