= 2012 in Chinese football =

Football in China
- Season: 2012

Men's football
- Super League: Guangzhou Evergrande
- League One: Shanghai Tellace
- League Two: Guizhou Zhicheng
- FA Cup: Guangzhou Evergrande

2012 in Chinese football involved the national competitions of the Chinese football league system and the national team.

== Domestic leagues ==
=== Promotion and relegation ===
Teams relegated from the Super League

- Chengdu Blades F.C.
- Shenzhen Ruby F.C.

Teams promoted to the Super League

- Dalian Aerbin F.C.
- Guangzhou R&F F.C.

Teams relegated from League one

- Guizhou Zhicheng F.C.

Teams promoted to League One

- Harbin Songbei Yiteng F.C.
- Chongqing F.C.
- Fujian Smart Hero F.C.

=== Chinese Super League ===
Pos	Team	Pld	W	D	L	GF	GA	GD	Pts	Qualification or relegation
1	Guangzhou Evergrande (C)	30	17	7	6	51	30	+21	58	2013 AFC Champions League group stage (Note: Guizhou Moutai qualified for the 2013 AFC Champions League because league champions Guangzhou Evergrande also won the 2012 Chinese FA Cup.)
2	Jiangsu Sainty	30	14	12	4	49	29	+20	54	2013 AFC Champions League group stage
3	Beijing Guoan	30	14	6	10	34	35	−1	48	2013 AFC Champions League group stage
4	Guizhou Moutai	30	12	9	9	44	33	+11	45	2013 AFC Champions League group stage
5	Dalian Aerbin	30	11	11	8	51	46	+5	44 (Note: Dalian 1–2 Changchun; Changchun 1–2 Dalian)	
6	Changchun Yatai	30	12	8	10	37	40	−3	44	
7	Guangzhou R&F	30	13	3	14	47	49	−2	42	
8	Tianjin TEDA	30	10	10	10	29	30	−1	40	
9	Shanghai Shenhua	30	8	14	8	39	34	+5	38	
10	Liaoning Whowin	30	8	12	10	40	41	−1	36 (Note: Liaoning, 10pts; Hangzhou, 9pts; Shandong, 6pts, GF=4, GA=5; Qingdao, 6pts, GF=4, GA=5)	
11	Hangzhou Greentown	30	9	9	12	34	46	−12	36	
12	Shandong Luneng	30	8	12	10	46	43	+3	36	
13	Qingdao Jonoon	30	10	6	14	26	34	−8	36	
14	Dalian Shide (D, R)	30	8	10	12	39	49	−10	34	Disbanded after season (Note: On 30 November 2012, Dalian Shide were acquisited by Aerbin Group and merged into Dalian Aerbin after their owner was arrested.)
15	Shanghai Shenxin	30	6	12	12	36	35	+1	30	
16	Henan Jianye (R)	30	7	5	18	28	56	−28	26	Relegation to China League One

Source: Chinese Super League (in Chinese)
Rules for classification: 1) points; 2) goal difference; 3) number of goals scored; 4) head-to-head goals scored; 5) goal difference; 6) goals scored; 7) disciplinary points (1 point for each yellow card, 3 points for each red card). Head-to-Head: Only used at the end of the season when two or more teams need the head-to-head rules to break a tie.
(C) Champions; (D) Disqualified; (R) Relegated

=== China League One ===
Pos	Team	Pld	W	D	L	GF	GA	GD	Pts	Promotion or relegation
1	Shanghai East Asia (P, C)	30	17	8	5	47	25	+22	59	Promotion to Chinese Super League
2	Wuhan Zall (P)	30	16	6	8	40	29	+11	54	Promotion to Chinese Super League
3	Fujian Smart Hero	30	12	10	8	41	32	+9	46	
4	Harbin Songbei Yiteng	30	13	6	11	53	43	+10	45 (Note: Harbin Songbei Yiteng 10 pts; Chongqing Lifan 3 pts; Tianjin Songjiang 2 pts)	
5	Chongqing Lifan	30	12	9	9	50	45	+5	45	
6	Tianjin Songjiang	30	12	9	9	27	24	+3	45	
7	Shenzhen Ruby	30	12	6	12	46	41	+5	42	
8	Chongqing F.C.	30	11	8	11	40	37	+3	41 (Note: Chongqing F.C. 4–0 Chengdu Tiancheng; Chengdu Tiancheng 2–1 Chongqing F.C.)	
9	Chengdu Tiancheng	30	11	8	11	33	40	−7	41	
10	Guangdong Sunray Cave	30	10	8	12	41	46	−5	38 (Note: Guangdong Sunray Cave 7 pts, GD: +3; Hunan Billows 7 pts, GD: 0; Shenyang Shenbei 2 pts)	
11	Hunan Billows	30	10	8	12	33	37	−4	38	
12	Shenyang Shenbei	30	9	11	10	36	38	−2	38	
13	Yanbian Changbai Tiger	30	10	4	16	39	51	−12	34	
14	Beijing BIT	30	8	8	14	27	41	−14	32	
15	Beijing Baxy	30	8	7	15	34	46	−12	31	
16	Hohhot Dongjin (R)	30	5	12	13	30	42	−12	27	Relegation to China League Two

Updated to match(es) played on October 28, 2012. Source: CL1 website on sohu.com (in Chinese)
Rules for classification: 1) points; 2) goal difference; 3) number of goals scored; 4) head-to-head goals scored; 5) goal difference; 6) goals scored; 7) disciplinary points (1 point for each yellow card, 3 points for each red card). Head-to-Head: Only used at the end of the season when two or more teams need the head-to-head rules to break a tie.
(C) Champions; (P) Promoted; (R) Relegated

== Domestic cups ==
=== Super Cup ===
25 February 2012 Super Cup	Guangzhou Evergrande	2–1	Tianjin Teda	Guangzhou University City Stadium, Guangzhou
14:00 CEST	Cléo 2', 48'	Report	83' Wang Xinxin	Attendance: 11,123; Referee: Tan Hai (Beijing)
