= Yan Shipeng =

Chinese footballer

Yan Shipeng 阎世鹏
Personal information
- Date of birth: 8 September 1987 (age 39)
- Place of birth: Dalian, Liaoning, China
- Height: 1.80 m (5 ft 11 in)
- Position: Defender

Youth career
- Dalian Shide

Senior career*
Years	Team	Apps	(Gls)
2005–2008	Dalian Shide	0	(0)
2007–2008	→ Citizen (loan)	10	(0)
2011–2012	Chongqing FC	41	(3)
2013–2018	Changchun Yatai	12	(0)
2017	→ Shaanxi Chang'an Athletic (loan)	13	(0)
2018–2021	Chengdu Better City	30	(0)
- * Club domestic league appearances and goals as of 31 December 2020

Yan Shipeng (Chinese: 阎世鹏; pinyin: Yán Shìpéng, born 8 September 1987 in Dalian) is a Chinese footballer.

== Club career ==
Yan started his professional football career in 2005 when he was promoted to Chinese Super League side Dalian Shide's first team. He was loaned out to Hong Kong First Division League side Citizen along with Wang Xuanhong at the beginning of the 2007/08 season. On 16 September 2007, he debuted in a 4–0 away victory against Bulova Rangers, coming on as a substitute for Márcio Bambú in the 60th minute. After playing 10 league matches for Citizen, he was called back by Dalian Shide for the 2008 Chinese Super League campaign in January 2008.

Yan eventually failed to establish himself within the first team and was put on the transfer list at the end of the 2008 season. He was linked with Shenyang Dongjin and Jiangsu Sainty between 2009 and 2010 but could not receive a contract after trial. He returned to his hometown without a professional football club and trained with the amateur football team Dalian Longjuanfeng to maintain his fitness.

Yan joined China League Two side Chongqing FC in 2011. He played 20 matches in the 2011 season, making an impression within the team as Chongqing FC won promotion to the second tier at the end of the season. In the final, Chongqing FC lost to Harbin Yiteng 6–5 in the penalty shootout, but he lost a penalty in the last round. He made 21 appearances and scored a goal in the 2012 league season, knowing by the nickname "Maicon of Chongqing" by local people.

Yan transferred to Super League club Changchun Yatai on 23 February 2013. On 10 July 2013, he made his debut for Changchun in the fourth round of 2013 Chinese FA Cup which Changchun lost to Guizhou Renhe 1–0 at Guiyang Olympic Sports Center. In July 2017, Yan was loaned to China League Two club Shaanxi Chang'an Athletic until 31 December 2017.

== Career statistics ==
Statistics accurate as of match played 31 December 2020.

Appearances and goals by club, season and competition
Club	Season	League			National Cup		League Cup		Continental		Other		Total	
Club	Season	Division	Apps	Goals	Apps	Goals	Apps	Goals	Apps	Goals	Apps	Goals	Apps	Goals
Dalian Shide	2005	Chinese Super League	0	0	0	0	0	0	-		-		0	0
Dalian Shide	2006	Chinese Super League	0	0	0	0	-		0	0	0 (Note: Appearances in A3 Champions Cup)	0	0	0
Dalian Shide	2007	Chinese Super League	0	0	-		-		-		-		0	0
Dalian Shide	2008	Chinese Super League	0	0	-		-		-		-		0	0
Dalian Shide	Total		0	0	0	0	0	0	0	0	0	0	0	0
Citizen (loan)	2007–08	Hong Kong First Division League	10	0	0	0	0	0	-		1 (Note: Appearances in Senior Shield)	0	11	0
Chongqing FC	2011	China League Two	20	2	-		-		-		-		20	2
Chongqing FC	2012	China League One	21	1	0	0	-		-		-		21	1
Chongqing FC	Total		41	3	0	0	0	0	0	0	0	0	41	3
Changchun Yatai	2013	Chinese Super League	0	0	1	0	-		-		-		1	0
Changchun Yatai	2014	Chinese Super League	2	0	1	1	-		-		-		3	1
Changchun Yatai	2015	Chinese Super League	2	0	0	0	-		-		-		2	0
Changchun Yatai	2016	Chinese Super League	4	0	0	0	-		-		-		4	0
Changchun Yatai	2017	Chinese Super League	4	0	1	0	-		-		-		5	0
Changchun Yatai	Total		12	0	3	1	0	0	0	0	0	0	15	1
Shaanxi Chang'an Athletic	2017	China League Two	13	0	0	0	-		-		-		13	0
Chengdu Better City	2018	Chinese Champions League	-		-		-		-		-		-	-
Chengdu Better City	2019	China League Two	23	0	1	0	-		-		-		24	0
Chengdu Better City	2020	China League One	7	0	1	0	-		-		-		8	0
Chengdu Better City	Total		30	0	2	0	0	0	0	0	0	0	32	0
Career total			106	3	5	1	0	0	0	0	1	0	112	4
