= Ji Xiaoxuan =

Chinese footballer (born 1993)

Ji Xiaoxuan 季骁宣
Personal information
- Date of birth: 19 March 1993 (age 33)
- Place of birth: Xianju, Zhejiang, China
- Height: 1.80 m (5 ft 11 in)
- Position: Winger

Youth career
- Shanghai Shenhua
- Shanghai Dongya

Senior career*
Years	Team	Apps	(Gls)
2011–2012	Shanghai Zobon		
2013–2014	Shanghai Dongya	0	(0)
2014–2018	Harbin Yiteng	87	(7)
2019–2020	Auxerre B	7	(1)
2019–2022	Auxerre	1	(0)
2021	→ Qingdao FC (loan)	11	(2)
- * Club domestic league appearances and goals as of 01:32, 19 January 2022 (UTC)

Ji Xiaoxuan (Chinese: 季骁宣; pinyin: Jì Xiāoxuān; born 19 March 1993) is a Chinese former professional footballer who plays as a winger.

== Club career ==
Ji was born in Xianju. He started his professional football career in 2011 when he was loaned to Shanghai Zobon's squad for the 2011 China League Two campaign. He joined Chinese Super League's newcomer Shanghai Dongya in 2013. On 21 May 2013, he made his debut for Shanghai Dongya in the third round of 2013 Chinese FA Cup which Shanghai Dongya played against Chongqing Lifan. Ji scored his penalty in the penalty shootout and Shanghai eventually beat Chongqing 6–5 and advanced to the next round.

On 2 July 2014, Ji transferred to Chinese Super League side Harbin Yiteng. He won the title of 2018 China League One most valuable player.

In January 2019, Ji moved abroad and joined French side Auxerre.

== Career statistics ==
As of 1 July 2022.

Appearances and goals by club, season and competition
Club	Season	League			National Cup		Other		Total	
Club	Season	Division	Apps	Goals	Apps	Goals	Apps	Goals	Apps	Goals
Shanghai Zobon	2011	China League Two			—		—			
Shanghai Zobon	2012	China League Two			2	1	—		2	1
Shanghai Zobon	Total				2	1	—		2	1
Shanghai Dongya	2013	Chinese Super League	0	0	1	0	—		1	0
Shanghai Dongya	2014	Chinese Super League	0	0	0	0	—		0	0
Shanghai Dongya	Total		0	0	1	0	—		1	0
Zhejiang Yiteng	2014	Chinese Super League	7	1	0	0	—		7	1
Zhejiang Yiteng	2015	China League One	13	1	0	0	—		13	1
Zhejiang Yiteng	2016	China League One	25	0	0	0	—		25	0
Zhejiang Yiteng	2017	China League One	15	0	0	0	—		15	0
Zhejiang Yiteng	2018	China League One	27	5	0	0	—		27	5
Zhejiang Yiteng	Total		87	7	0	0	—		87	7
Auxerre B	2018–19	National 3	2	0	—		—		2	0
Auxerre B	2019–20	National 3	5	1	—		—		5	1
Auxerre B	Total		7	1	—		—		7	1
Auxerre	2019–20	Ligue 2	1	0	2	1	0	0	3	1
Auxerre	2020–21	Ligue 2	0	0	1	0	—		1	0
Auxerre	2021–22	Ligue 2	0	0	0	0	0	0	0	0
Auxerre	Total		1	0	3	1	0	0	4	1
Qingdao FC (loan)	2021	Chinese Super League	11	2	2	0	2 (Note: Appearances in the Chinese Super League relegation play-offs)	0	15	2
Career total			106	10	8	2	2	0	116	12
