= Xiao Zhen (footballer, born 1987) =

Chinese footballer

Xiao Zhen 肖震
Personal information
- Date of birth: 15 April 1987 (age 39)
- Place of birth: Dalian, Liaoning, China
- Height: 1.85 m (6 ft 1 in)
- Positions: Defender; forward

Senior career*
| Years | Team | Apps | (Gls) |
| 2005–2010 | Liaoning Whowin | 86 | (5) |
| 2011–2013 | Chongqing F.C. | 69 | (6) |
| 2014–2016 | Meizhou Kejia | 63 | (4) |
| 2017–2019 | Sichuan Longfor | 77 | (8) |
| 2020– | Meizhou Hakka | 31 | (3) |
- * Club domestic league appearances and goals as of 21 December 2022

Xiao Zhen (Chinese: 肖震; born 15 April 1987 in Dalian, Liaoning) is a Chinese footballer who currently plays as defender or forward.

== Club career ==
Xiao Zhen started his professional football career in 2005 when he was promoted to Liaoning Whowin's first squad. On 1 May 2005, he made his debut for Liaoning FC in the 2005 Chinese Super League against Qingdao Jonoon, coming on as a substitute for Zhu Kai in the 85th minute. He would gradually start to establish himself within the squad, however he was part of the team that was relegated at the end of the 2008 league season. Despite this setback, Xiao would remain with the club and helped them back into the top tier when he won the second division title with the team.

On 23 February 2011, Xiao transferred to China League Two side Chongqing F.C. While he may have moved down to a third tier club, they would push for promotion and with Xiao playing as a forward they achieved promotion by coming runners-up to Harbin Songbei Yiteng at the end of the 2011 China League Two campaign. While he helped establish Chongqing within the second division throughout the 2012 campaign this could not be repeated in the 2013 campaign and the club were relegated at the end of the season and then dissolved.

In March 2014, Xiao transferred to China League Two side Meizhou Kejia. He would go on to help guide the club to win the division title in a penalty shoot-out against Dalian Transcendence and promotion to the second tier for the first time in the clubs history. On 7 December 2016, Xiao moved to fellow League Two side Sichuan Longfor. Once again he moved a level down to join another ambitious club that would push for promotion, achieving this at the end of the 2018 China League Two campaign. The club was dissolved after they failed to submit the salary & bonus confirmation form before the 2020 season. Xiao would rejoin Meizhou and would then go on to be a member of the team that gained promotion to the top tier after coming second within the division at the end of the 2021 China League One campaign.

== Career statistics ==
Statistics accurate as of match played 21 December 2022.

| Club | Season | League | | | National Cup | | Continental | | Other | | Total | |
| Club | Season | Division | Apps | Goals | Apps | Goals | Apps | Goals | Apps | Goals | Apps | Goals |
|---|---|---|---|---|---|---|---|---|---|---|---|---|
| Liaoning Whowin | 2005 | Chinese Super League | 16 | 2 | 0 | 0 | - | | - | | 16 | 2 |
| Liaoning Whowin | 2006 | Chinese Super League | 18 | 0 | 0 | 0 | - | | - | | 18 | 0 |
| Liaoning Whowin | 2007 | Chinese Super League | 13 | 0 | - | | - | | - | | 13 | 0 |
| Liaoning Whowin | 2008 | Chinese Super League | 13 | 1 | - | | - | | - | | 13 | 1 |
| Liaoning Whowin | 2009 | China League One | 9 | 2 | - | | - | | - | | 9 | 2 |
| Liaoning Whowin | 2010 | Chinese Super League | 17 | 0 | - | | - | | - | | 17 | 0 |
| Liaoning Whowin | Total | | 86 | 5 | 0 | 0 | 0 | 0 | 0 | 0 | 86 | 5 |
| Chongqing F.C. | 2011 | China League Two | 23 | 5 | - | | - | | - | | 23 | 5 |
| Chongqing F.C. | 2012 | China League One | 27 | 1 | 0 | 0 | - | | - | | 27 | 1 |
| Chongqing F.C. | 2013 | China League One | 19 | 0 | 1 | 0 | - | | - | | 20 | 0 |
| Chongqing F.C. | Total | | 69 | 6 | 1 | 0 | 0 | 0 | 0 | 0 | 70 | 6 |
| Meizhou Kejia | 2014 | China League Two | 21 | 3 | 3 | 0 | - | | - | | 24 | 3 |
| Meizhou Kejia | 2015 | China League Two | 17 | 1 | 3 | 0 | - | | - | | 20 | 1 |
| Meizhou Kejia | 2016 | China League One | 25 | 0 | 1 | 0 | - | | - | | 26 | 0 |
| Meizhou Kejia | Total | | 63 | 4 | 7 | 0 | 0 | 0 | 0 | 0 | 70 | 4 |
| Sichuan Longfor | 2017 | China League Two | 22 | 5 | 1 | 0 | - | | - | | 23 | 5 |
| Sichuan Longfor | 2018 | China League Two | 26 | 3 | 3 | 0 | - | | - | | 29 | 3 |
| Sichuan Longfor | 2019 | China League One | 29 | 0 | 0 | 0 | - | | - | | 29 | 0 |
| Sichuan Longfor | Total | | 77 | 8 | 4 | 0 | 0 | 0 | 0 | 0 | 81 | 8 |
| Meizhou Hakka | 2020 | China League One | 12 | 1 | 0 | 0 | - | | - | | 12 | 1 |
| Meizhou Hakka | 2021 | China League One | 19 | 2 | 0 | 0 | - | | - | | 19 | 2 |
| Meizhou Hakka | Total | | 31 | 3 | 0 | 0 | 0 | 0 | 0 | 0 | 31 | 3 |
| Career total | | | 326 | 26 | 12 | 0 | 0 | 0 | 0 | 0 | 338 | 26 |

== Honours ==
=== Club ===
Liaoning Whowin

- China League One: 2009

Meizhou Kejia

- China League Two: 2015

Sichuan Longfor

- China League Two: 2018
