= Zhi Yaqi =

Chinese footballer

Zhi Yaqi 支雅琪
Personal information
- Date of birth: March 27, 1990 (age 36)
- Place of birth: Tianjin, China
- Height: 1.90 m (6 ft 3 in)
- Position: Forward

Senior career*
Years	Team	Apps	(Gls)
2009	Shenzhen Asia Travel	7	(0)
2009	→ Xiangxue Eisiti (loan)	3	(0)
2010	Jiangsu Sainty	1	(0)
2011	Chongqing F.C.	8	(0)
2012–2013	Shenzhen Fengpeng	28	(1)
2014	Shenyang Dongjin	8	(2)
2015	Baoding Yingli ETS	13	(3)
- * Club domestic league appearances and goals as of 24 August 2015

Zhi Yaqi (Chinese: 支雅琪; pinyin: Zhī Yǎqí; born 27 March 1990) is a Chinese football player.

== Club career ==
In 2009, Zhi Yaqi started his professional footballer career with Shenzhen Asia Travel in the Chinese Super League. On 28 March 2009, he made his debut for Shenzhen in the 2009 Chinese Super League against Guangzhou Evergrande, coming on as a substitute for Renan Marques in the 66th minute. In March 2010，Zhi transferred to Chinese Super League side Jiangsu Sainty . In 2011, Zhi transferred to China League Two side Chongqing F.C. In 2012, Zhi transferred to China League Two side Shenzhen Fengpeng. In March 2014, Zhi transferred to China League Two side Shenyang Dongjin.

In March 2015, Zhi transferred to fellow China League Two side Baoding Yingli ETS.

== Club career statistics ==
Statistics accurate as of match played 24 August 2015

Club performance			League		Cup		League Cup		Continental		Total	
Season	Club	League	Apps	Goals	Apps	Goals	Apps	Goals	Apps	Goals	Apps	Goals
Hong Kong			League		FA Cup		Shield & League Cup		Asia		Total	
2008–09	Xiangxue Eisiti	Hong Kong First Division League	3	0	0	0	0	0	-		3	0
China PR			League		FA Cup		CSL Cup		Asia		Total	
2009	Shenzhen Asia Travel	Chinese Super League	7	0	-		-		-		7	0
2010	Jiangsu Sainty	Chinese Super League	1	0	-		-		-		1	0
2011	Chongqing F.C.	China League Two	8	0	-		-		-		8	0
2012	Shenzhen Fengpeng	China League Two	23	1	-		-		-		23	1
2013	Shenzhen Fengpeng	China League Two	5	0	0	0	-		-		5	0
2014	Shenyang Dongjin	China League Two	8	2	0	0	-		-		8	2
2015	Baoding Yingli ETS	China League Two	13	3	-		-		-		13	3
Total	Hong Kong		3	0	0	0	0	0	0	0	3	0
Total	China PR		65	6	0	0	0	0	0	0	65	6
