= 2011 China League Two =

China League Two
- Season: 2011
- Champions: Harbin Songbei Yiteng
- Promoted: Harbin Songbei Yiteng; Chongqing F.C. Fujian Smart Hero (via promotion/relegation play-off)
- Top goalscorer: (China) Shi Jun (13 goals, Sichuan Dujiangyan Symbol)

The 2011 China League Two season is the 22nd season since its establishment in 1989. League kicked off on 8 May 2011 and ended on 24 November 2011.

== Clubs ==
Divisions	Club	Head coach	City	Stadium	2010 season
North	Fushun Xinye	(China) Sun Wei	Fushun	Leifeng Stadium	
North	Harbin Songbei Yiteng	(China) Duan Xin	Harbin	Harbin International Convention and Exhibition Center Stadium	North 2nd
North	Hebei Zhongji	(China) Wei Yuanhao	Shijiazhuang	Yutong International Sports Centre Stadium	
North	Jiangsu Youth	(China) Zhu Jinxing	Jiangyin	Jiangyin Stadium	
North	Qingdao QUST	(China) Guo Zuojin	Qingdao	Hushan Stadium; Hongcheng Stadium	
North	Qinghai Youth	(China) Liang Jinning	Xining	Duoba Reception of National Plateau Athlete Training Base	
North	Shandong Youth	(China) Hu Yijun	Weifang	Shandong Luneng Taishan Football School	
North	Shaanxi Youth	(China) Zhang Yuede	Xi'an	Xi'an Siyuan University Stadium	
South	Chongqing F.C.	(China) Zhao Faqing	Chongqing	Chongqing Olympic Sports Center	
South	Dongguan Nancheng	(China) Li Hu	Dongguan	Dongguan Nancheng Sports Park Stadium	
South	Fujian Smart Hero	(China) Zhao Tuqiang	Xiamen (playing in Longyan)	Longyan Sports Centre	
South	Guangdong Youth	(China) Guo Yijun	Huizhou	Boluo County Stadium	
South	Guangzhou Youth	(China) Peng Weiguo	Guangzhou	Yuexiushan Stadium / Yanzigang Stadium	
South	Hubei Youth	(China) Hu Yijun	Wuhan	Jianghan'erqiao Athlete Training Base	
South	Hubei CTGU Kangtian	(China) Xu Jian	Wuhan	Hankou Cultural Sports Centre	South 3rd
South	Shanghai Zobon	(China) Cheng Yaodong	Shanghai	Jinshan Sports Centre	CL1, 10th
South	Sichuan Dujiangyan Symbol	(China) Zhao Lei	Dujiangyan	Dujiangyan Phoenix Sports Centre	
South	Sichuan F.C.	(China) Sun Bowei	Chengdu	Sichuan University Stadium	South 4th
South	Zhejiang Youth	(China) Yang Ji	Wenzhou	Wenzhou Sports Centre	

== Managerial changes ==
Team	Outgoing manager	Manner of departure	Date of vacancy	Table	Incoming manager	Date of appointment
Chongqing F.C.	(China) Pei Encai	Sacked	6 June 2011	South 8th	(China) Zhao Faqing	21 June 2011
Jiangsu Youth	(Ukraine) Leonid Koltun	Resigned	22 July 2011	North 7th	(China) Zhu Jinxing	3 August 2011

== Group Stage Standings ==
=== North Group ===
Pos	Team	Pld	W	D	L	GF	GA	GD	Pts	Qualification
1	Fushun Xinye (Q)	14	12	0	2	35	4	+31	36 (Note: Fushun, 6 pts, 3-0 ; Harbin, 0 pts, 0-3)	Qualification for Play-offs
2	Harbin Songbei Yiteng (C, Q, P)	14	12	0	2	31	4	+27	36	Qualification for Play-offs
3	Shandong Youth (Q)	14	9	1	4	29	12	+17	28	Qualification for Play-offs
4	Qingdao QUST (Q)	14	5	4	5	18	18	0	19	Qualification for Play-offs
5	Hebei Zhongji	14	4	4	6	14	16	−2	16	
6	Shaanxi Youth	14	4	2	8	19	23	−4	14	
7	Jiangsu Youth	14	2	5	7	14	29	−15	11	
8	Qinghai Youth	14	0	0	14	2	56	−54	0	

(C) Champions; (P) Promoted; (Q) Qualified for the phase indicated

=== South Group ===
Pos	Team	Pld	W	D	L	GF	GA	GD	Pts	Qualification
1	Fujian Smart Hero (O, Q, P)	20	11	6	3	24	11	+13	39	Qualification for Play-offs
2	Chongqing F.C. (P, Q)	20	11	5	4	34	17	+17	38 (Note: Chongqing, 3 pts, 2-1 ; Sichuan, 3 pts, 1-2)	Qualification for Play-offs
3	Sichuan Dujiangyan Symbol (Q)	20	11	5	4	34	14	+20	38 (Note: CQFC)	Qualification for Play-offs
4	Dongguan Nancheng (Q)	20	10	6	4	28	14	+14	36	Qualification for Play-offs
5	Shanghai Zobon	20	8	7	5	30	23	+7	31	
6	Hubei CTGU Kangtian	20	7	8	5	28	21	+7	29	
7	Guangdong Youth	20	5	8	7	25	27	−2	23	
8	Guangzhou Youth	20	5	5	10	24	36	−12	20	
9	Zhejiang Youth	20	3	8	9	19	25	−6	17	
10	Hubei Youth	20	3	6	11	22	48	−26	15	
11	Sichuan F.C.	20	2	4	14	12	44	−32	10	

Updated to match(es) played on 24 September 2011. Source: C2L Site on Sohu.com
Rules for classification: 1st points; 2nd head-to-head points; 3rd head-to-head goal difference; 4th head-to-head goals scored; 5th goal difference; 6th goals scored; 7th disciplinary points (1 point for each yellow card, 3 points for each red card).
(O) Play-off winners; (P) Promoted; (Q) Qualified for the phase indicated

== Group Stage results ==
=== North Division ===
Home \ Away	FSX	HSY	HBZ	JSY	QHY	QUST	SDY	SXY
Fushun Xinye		1–0	2–1	1–0	7–0	4–0	2–0	2–1
Harbin Songbei Yiteng	0–2		2–0	4–0	6–0	1–0	1–0	2–0
Hebei Zhongji	1–0	1–2		1–1	6–1	1–1	0–3	0–0
Jiangsu Youth	0–4	0–4	1–1		3–1	1–1	2–2	1–4
Qinghai Youth	0–3	0–2	0–1	0–5		0–3	0–4	0–5
Qingdao QUST	0–2	0–3	1–0	1–1	7–0		2–0	1–0
Shandong Youth	1–0	0–2	2–0	3–0	3–0	4–0		3–1
Shaanxi Youth	0–5	0–2	0–1	2–1	3–0	1–1	2–4	

Source: League Two results
Legend: Blue = home team win; Yellow = draw; Red = away team win.

=== South Division ===
Home \ Away	CQ	DGN	FSH	GDY	GZY	HBK	HBY	SHZ	DJYS	SC	ZJY
Chongqing F.C.		0–1	1–0	2–2	4–0	1–1	3–2	2–1	2–0	4–0	1–0
Dongguan Nancheng	0–1		0–1	3–1	1–0	2–1	1–2	0–0	1–0	5–0	0–0
Fujian Smart Hero	2–0	1–1		1–0	2–1	1–1	1–0	0–1	2–1	2–0	0–0
Guangdong Youth	1–2	2–0	1–0		3–3	0–2	1–1	0–0	1–1	2–1	2–2
Guangzhou Youth	1–1	0–2	2–2	1–0		1–0	2–3	2–1	1–3	3–4	2–3
Hubei CTGU Kangtian	1–1	0–1	0–0	3–1	1–1		5–1	3–4	1–1	3–0	3–1
Hubei Youth	0–3	2–6	0–3	1–3	1–1	0–1		2–3	1–1	0–0	1–0
Shanghai Zobon	2–2	2–2	1–2	1–1	1–2	0–0	5–3		0–1	2–0	1–1
Sichuan Dujiangyan Symbol	1–0	0–0	1–1	1–0	1–0	4–0	7–0	0–1		1–0	3–1
Sichuan F.C.	0–3	0–1	0–2	0–2	3–0	0–0	2–2	0–3	1–5		1–1
Zhejiang Youth	2–1	1–1	0–1	2–2	0–1	1–2	0–0	0–1	1–2	3–0	

Source: League Two results
Legend: Blue = home team win; Yellow = draw; Red = away team win.

== Play-offs ==
=== Quarter-finals ===
Team 1	Agg.	Team 2	1st leg	2nd leg
Fushun Xinye	QF1	Dongguan Nancheng	3-2	0-1
Shandong Youth	QF2	Chongqing F.C.	2-1	1-3
Qingdao QUST	QF3	Fujian Smart Hero	1-1	0-3
Harbin Songbei Yiteng	QF4	Sichuan Dujiangyan Symbol	2-1	1-2 (pen. 5-4)

==== First legs ====
6 October 2011
14:30 CEST

Fushun Xinye	3–2	Dongguan Nancheng
Wang Ziming 27'; Sun Fenghao 63'; Gong Yu 76'	Report	Liao Lisheng 25'; Wang Rui 44'

Leifeng Stadium, Fushun

6 October 2011
14:30 CEST

Shandong Youth	2–1	Chongqing F.C.
Du Yuxin 22'; Cheng Yuan 68'	Report	Di You 30' (pen.)

Shandong Luneng Taishan Football School, Weifang

7 October 2011
14:30 CEST

Qingdao QUST	1–1	Fujian Smart Hero
Yang Zengqi 31'	Report	Yu Liang 60'

Hongcheng Stadium, Qingdao

7 October 2011
14:30 CEST

Harbin Songbei Yiteng	2–1	Sichuan Dujiangyan Symbol
Li Xin 55' 90+1'	Report	Zhou Jun 65'

Harbin International Convention and Exhibition Center Stadium, Harbin

==== Second legs ====
10 October 2011
14:30 CEST

Dongguan Nancheng	1-0	Fushun Xinye
Zhang Xingbo 45'	Report

Dongguan Nancheng Sports Park Stadium, Dongguan

10 October 2011
14:30 CEST

Chongqing F.C.	3-1	Shandong Youth
Di You 31'; Ma Xiaolei 40'; Xiao Zhen 45'	Report	Luo Senwen 10'

Chongqing Olympic Sports Center, Chongqing

11 October 2011
14:30 CEST

Fujian Smart Hero	3-0	Qingdao QUST
Yu Jing 10' 37'; Hou Zhe 47'	Report

Longyan Sports Center, Longyan

11 October 2011
14:30 CEST

Sichuan Dujiangyan Symbol	2-1 (a.e.t.)	Harbin Songbei Yiteng
Shi Jun 17' 89'	Report	Wang Dalong 15'
Penalties
Lü Yi (penalty scored); Ma Chongchong (penalty scored); Lu Di (penalty missed); Chen Shaoqin (penalty scored); Shi Jun (penalty scored)	4 – 5	(penalty scored) Yin Liangyi; (penalty scored) Han Xu; (penalty scored) Bu Xin; (penalty scored) Ma Zhiyong; (penalty scored) Li Xiaoting

Dujiangyan Phoenix Sports Centre, Dujiangyan

=== Semi-finals ===
Team 1	Agg.	Team 2	1st leg	2nd leg
Chongqing F.C. (P)	SF1	Dongguan Nancheng	0-0	3-0
Harbin Songbei Yiteng (P)	SF2	Fujian Smart Hero	2-0	1-1

==== First legs ====
14 November 2011
14:30 CEST

Chongqing F.C.	0-0	Dongguan Nancheng
	Report

Chongqing Olympic Sports Center, Chongqing

15 November 2011
14:30 CEST

Harbin Songbei Yiteng	2-0	Fujian Smart Hero
Bu Xin 18'; Niu Xilong 40'	Report

Harbin International Convention and Exhibition Center Stadium, Harbin

==== Second legs ====
18 November 2011
14:30 CEST

Dongguan Nancheng	0-3	Chongqing F.C.
	Report	Xiao Zhen 16'; Ouyang Xue 45'; Zhang Gen 86'

Dongguan Nancheng Sports Park Stadium, Dongguan
Referee: (China) Wang Di

19 November 2011
14:30 CEST

Fujian Smart Hero	1-1	Harbin Songbei Yiteng
Zhang Song 85'	Report	Xian Tao 90+1' (pen.)

Longyan Sports Centre, Longyan
Referee: (China) Zhao Liang

=== Third-place play-off ===
23 November 2011
14:30 CEST

Dongguan Nancheng	0-2	Fujian Smart Hero
	Report	Zhang Song 26'; Hou Zhe 70'

Yingtan City Stadium, Yingtan

2011 China League Two 3rd-placed team faces 2011 China League One 14th-placed team for a play-off match. The winner will earn a spot in the 2012 China League One. See 2011 China League One#Relegation play-off.

=== Final ===
24 November 2011
14:30 CEST

Chongqing F.C.	1 - 1 (a.e.t.)	Harbin Songbei Yiteng (C)
Meng Wei 77'	Report	Liu Xiaolong 74'
Penalties
Di You (penalty scored); Ma Xiaolei (penalty scored); Zhang Gen (penalty missed); Du Yu (penalty scored); Guo Mingyue (penalty missed); Wang Xiang (penalty scored); Yan Shipeng (penalty missed)	4 – 5	(penalty missed) Yin Liangyi; (penalty scored) Liu Xiaolong; (penalty missed) Zhao Wei; (penalty scored) Bu Xin; (penalty scored) Han Xu; (penalty scored) Shao Shuai; (penalty scored) Niu Xilong

Chongqing Olympic Sports Center, Chongqing
Referee: (China) Zhao Liang
