= Ma Xiaolei =

Chinese footballer

Ma Xiaolei 马晓磊
Personal information
- Date of birth: 19 January 1987 (age 39)
- Place of birth: Beijing, China
- Height: 1.77 m (5 ft 9 1/2 in)
- Position: Midfielder

Youth career
- 2002–2006: Shenzhen Jianlibao

Senior career*
Years	Team	Apps	(Gls)
2006–2009	Shenzhen Shangqingyin	17	(1)
2010	Anhui Jiufang	22	(2)
2011	Tianjin Runyulong	0	(0)
2011	→ FK Sūduva (loan)	0	(0)
2011–2013	Chongqing FC	68	(15)
2014	Meizhou Kejia	19	(8)
2015	Changchun Yatai	13	(0)
2016–2017	Shenzhen Renren	31	(18)
2018–2022	Chengdu Rongcheng	43	(25)
2021	→ Shaanxi Chang'an Athletic (loan)	3	(0)
2021	→ Sichuan Minzu (loan)	11	(3)
2022	→ Sichuan Jiuniu (loan)	21	(10)
2023–2024	Shaanxi Union	20	(4)

Managerial career
- 2025: Shaanxi Union (team manager)
- * Club domestic league appearances and goals as of 1 January 2026

Ma Xiaolei (Chinese: 马晓磊; pinyin: Mǎ Xiǎolěi; born 19 January 1987 in Beijing) is a Chinese former football player.

== Club career ==
Ma Xiaolei was promoted to Chinese Super League side Shenzhen FC in 2006. On 1 September 2007, he made his senior debut in a 4–1 away defeat against Shanghai Shenhua. He scored his first goal four days later, which ensured Shenzhen beat Henan Construction 2–0. Ma moved to China League One side Anhui Jiufang in 2010. He became the player of Tianjin Runyulong in the 2011 season after Anhui jiufang was taken over by Tianjin Runyulong. Ma was loaned to Lithuanian A Lyga side FK Sūduva in February 2011. Ma returned to China in June 2011 and signed a contract with China League Two club Chongqing FC. After three seasons at Chongqing, Ma moved to League Two side Meizhou Kejia in February 2014. In January 2015, Ma transferred to Chinese Super League side Changchun Yatai. He made his debut on 8 March 2015, in a 2–0 league defeat against Shandong Luneng Taishan. He was sent off in the match.

In July 2016, Ma signed for China League Two side Shenzhen Renren. After two seasons within the third tier, he joined fourth tier club Chengdu Better City. At Chengdu, he would establish himself as a regular within the team that saw them win promotion into the third division. In their 2019 league campaign, he would play a vital part in the clubs meteoric rise throughout the divisions by winning another promotion to the second division.

Ma joined Shaanxi Union in 2023 and retired in 2024.

In January 2025, Ma was appointed as the team manager of Shaanxi Union.

== Career statistics ==
As of 1 January 2026.

Appearances and goals by club, season and competition
Club	Season	League			National Cup		Continental		Other		Total	
Club	Season	Division	Apps	Goals	Apps	Goals	Apps	Goals	Apps	Goals	Apps	Goals
Shenzhen Shangqingyin	2006	Chinese Super League	0	0	0	0	-		-		0	0
Shenzhen Shangqingyin	2007	Chinese Super League	11	1	-		-		-		11	1
Shenzhen Shangqingyin	2008	Chinese Super League	0	0	-		-		-		0	0
Shenzhen Shangqingyin	2009	Chinese Super League	6	0	-		-		-		6	0
Shenzhen Shangqingyin	Total		17	1	0	0	0	0	0	0	17	1
Anhui Jiufang	2010	China League One	22	2	-		-		-		22	2
FK Sūduva (loan)	2011	A Lyga	0	0	0	0	0	0	-		0	0
Chongqing FC	2011	China League Two	14	4	-		-		-		14	4
Chongqing FC	2012	China League One	27	7	0	0	-		-		2	0
Chongqing FC	2013	China League One	27	4	1	2	-		-		28	6
Chongqing FC	Total		68	15	1	2	0	0	0	0	69	17
Meizhou Kejia	2014	China League Two	19	8	1	0	-		-		20	8
Changchun Yatai	2015	Chinese Super League	13	0	0	0	-		-		13	0
Shenzhen Ledman	2016	China League Two	7	4	0	0	-		-		7	4
Shenzhen Ledman	2017	China League Two	24	14	1	0	-		-		25	14
Shenzhen Ledman	Total		31	18	1	0	0	0	0	0	32	18
Chengdu Better City	2018	Chinese Champions League	-		-		-		-		-	-
Chengdu Better City	2019	China League Two	29	23	1	1	-		-		30	24
Chengdu Better City	2020	China League One	14	2	1	0	-		-		15	2
Chengdu Better City	Total		43	25	2	1	0	0	0	0	45	26
Shaanxi Chang'an (loan)	2021	China League One	3	0	0	0	-		-		3	0
Sichuan Minzu (loan)	2021	China League Two	11	3	2	2	-		-		13	5
Sichuan Jiuniu (loan)	2022	China League One	21	10	1	2	-		-		22	12
Shaanxi Union	2023	Chinese Champions League	9	3	-		-		-		9	3
Shaanxi Union	2024	China League Two	11	1	2	3	-		-		13	4
Shaanxi Union	Total		20	4	2	3	0	0	0	0	22	7
Career total			268	86	10	10	0	0	0	0	278	96

== Honours ==
Shaanxi Chang'an Union

- CMCL play-offs: 2023
