= Wang Yang (footballer, born 1982) =

Chinese footballer

Wang Yang 王扬
Personal information
- Date of birth: May 1, 1982 (age 44)
- Place of birth: Nanjing, Jiangsu, China
- Height: 1.79 m (5 ft 10 1/2 in)
- Position: Striker

Youth career
- Jiangsu Sainty

Senior career*
Years	Team	Apps	(Gls)
2002–2010	Jiangsu Sainty	71	(12)
2004	→ Plaza Colonia (loan)	11	(4)
2011	Chongqing F.C.	14	(2)
- * Club domestic league appearances and goals

Wang Yang (born May 1, 1982, in Nanjing, Jiangsu) is a Chinese football player.

== Club career ==
Wang was promoted to Jiangsu Sainty senior team square in 2002 but had just a few chances to appear in the league game. In 2004, he was loaned to Uruguayan Primera División side Plaza Colonia for three months. Wang made his debut for Plaza Colonia on 14 September, in a 1 - 1 home draw with Rentistas. He scored his first senior league goal on his fifth appearance on 3 October. The goal he scored in the 75th minute ensured Plaza Colonia evened the score 2–2 with Nacional at home. He returned to Jiangsu in December 2004.

== Honours ==
Jiangsu Sainty

- China League One: 2008
