= Poon Man Chun =

Hong Kong footballer and manager

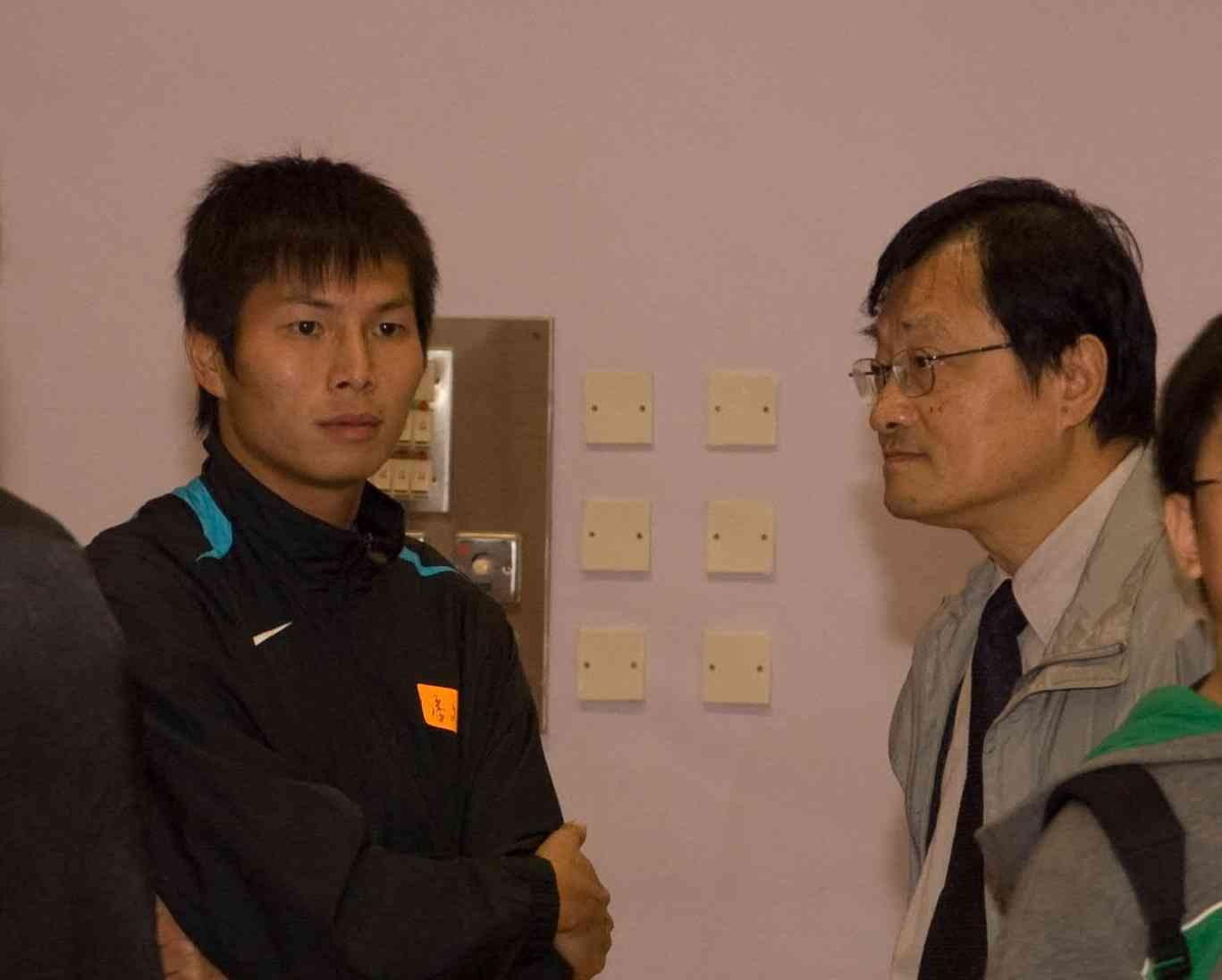

Personal information
- Full name: Poon Man Chun
- Date of birth: 27 April 1977 (age 49)
- Place of birth: Hong Kong
- Height: 1.78 m (5 ft 10 in)
- Position: Forward

Team information
- Current team: Kitchee (assistant coach)

Youth career
- 1989–1996: Hong Kong Sports Institute

Senior career*
Years	Team	Apps	(Gls)
1996–1998	Rangers (HKG)		
1998–2001	Instant-Dict		
1998–1999	→ Sai Kung Friends (loan)		
2000–2001	→ Yee Hope (loan)		
2001–2005	Fukien		
2005–2006	Tung Po		
2006–2007	Shek Kip Mei		
2007–2008	Rangers (HKG)	2	(0)

International career
1998	Hong Kong	3	(0)

Managerial career
- 2007–2008: Rangers (HKG) (assistant coach)
- 2008–2011: Fourway (assistant coach)
- 2011–2013: Tuen Mun (assistant coach)
- 2014: Sun Hei (assistant coach)
- 2014–2016: Wong Tai Sin
- 2016: Biu Chun Glory Sky
- 2016–2018: Meixian Techand (assistant coach)
- 2018: Meixian Techand (caretaker)
- 2019: Shenzhen Bogang (assistant coach)
- 2020–2021: North District (technical assistant)
- 2021–2023: Rangers (HKG) (youth coach)
- 2023: Rangers (HKG)
- 2023: Rangers (HKG) (assistant coach)
- 2023–2025: Kitchee (assistant coach)
- 2025–: Kitchee (assistant coach)
- 2025–: Kitchee U-22
- * Club domestic league appearances and goals

Poon Man Chun (Chinese: 潘文俊; born 27 April 1977) is a Hong Kong former professional footballer who played as a forward. He is currently the assistant coach of Hong Kong Premier League club Kitchee.

== Club career ==
Poon started his career with Hong Kong top flight side Rangers. In 2001, he signed for Fukien in the Hong Kong Second Division, helping them earn promotion to the Hong Kong top flight.

== Managerial career ==
In 2014, Poon was appointed as the assistant coach of Wong Tai Sin, where he said, "When I first debuted, I had a poor relationship with the media and the class owner. Naturally, my player career was not ideal."

In 2018, Poon was appointed as the caretaker manager of Meixian Techand in China League One, becoming the first Hong Kong manager in Chinese professional football, where he said, "The pace of the Mainland is slow, and I don't have many friends, it's really difficult to adapt. But at that time, I thought of learning from the Mainland and paving the way for my coaching career. I didn't consider whether my income would be more than that of Hong Kong."

In 2019, Poon was appointed as the assistant coach of China League Two club Shenzhen Bogang.

In April 2023, Poon was appointed as the head coach of Rangers.

On 29 September 2023, Poon was appointed as the assistant coach of Kitchee.

== Personal life ==
Poon's son, Poon Pui Hin, is also a professional footballer who is currently playing for Kitchee.
