= Zhang Gen =

Chinese association football player

Personal information
- Date of birth: 5 May 1987 (age 39)
- Height: 1.75 m (5 ft 9 in)
- Position: Midfielder

Team information
- Current team: Jiangxi Beidamen
- Number: 13

Youth career
- –2012: Chongqing

Senior career*
Years	Team	Apps	(Gls)
2012	Chongqing	1	(0)
2013–2016	Hebei China Fortune		
2017–2019	Jiangsu Yancheng Dingli	51	(9)
2019–	Jiangxi Beidamen	37	(2)
- * Club domestic league appearances and goals as of 14:01, 24 August 2021 (UTC)

Zhang Gen (Chinese: 章艮; born 5 May 1987) is a Chinese footballer currently playing as a midfielder for Jiangxi Beidamen.

== Career statistics ==
=== Club ===
As of 24 August 2021.

Club	Season	League			Cup		Other		Total	
Club	Season	Division	Apps	Goals	Apps	Goals	Apps	Goals	Apps	Goals
Chongqing	2012	China League One	1	0	0	0	0	0	1	0
Hebei China Fortune	2013	China League Two	–		2 (Note: Appearances in the Chinese FA Cup)	1	0	0	2	1
Hebei China Fortune	2014	China League One	10	0	0	0	0	0	10	0
Hebei China Fortune	2015	China League One	6	0	0	0	0	0	6	0
Hebei China Fortune	2016	Chinese Super League	0	0	0	0	0	0	0	0
Hebei China Fortune	Total		16	0	2	1	0	0	18	1
Jiangsu Yancheng Dingli	2017	China League Two	16	1	1	0	2 (Note: Appearances in the China League Two playoffs)	0	19	1
Jiangsu Yancheng Dingli	2018	China League Two	20	6	1	0	5	0	26	6
Jiangsu Yancheng Dingli	2019	China League Two	15	2	1	0	0	0	16	2
Jiangsu Yancheng Dingli	Total		51	9	3	0	7	0	61	9
Jiangxi Beidamen	2019	China League Two	11	2	0	0	4	1	15	3
Jiangxi Beidamen	2020	China League One	10	0	0	0	1 (Note: Appearances in the China League One relegation playoffs)	0	11	0
Jiangxi Beidamen	2021	China League One	16	0	0	0	0	0	16	0
Jiangxi Beidamen	Total		37	2	0	0	5	0	42	2
Career total			105	11	5	1	12	0	122	12
