= Cui Ren =

Chinese footballer of Korean descent

Cui Ren 최인 崔仁
Personal information
- Full name: Cui Ren
- Date of birth: 19 January 1989 (age 37)
- Place of birth: Yanji, Jilin, China
- Height: 1.70 m (5 ft 7 in)
- Position: Midfielder

Senior career*
Years	Team	Apps	(Gls)
2007–2014	Yanbian Changbaishan	121	(16)
2015	Shanghai Shenxin	8	(0)
2016–2018	Yanbian Funde	61	(12)
2019–2021	Zhejiang Pro	37	(2)

Managerial career
- 2023-: Yanbian Longding (Team Manager)
- * Club domestic league appearances and goals as of 27 April 2022

Cui Ren
- Simplified Chinese: 崔仁
Transcriptions
Standard Mandarin
- Hanyu Pinyin: Cuī Rén
- IPA: [tsʰwéɪ ɻə̌n]

Chinese Korean name
- Chosŏn'gŭl: 최인
Transcriptions
- Revised Romanization: Choe In
- McCune–Reischauer: Ch'oe In

Cui Ren (Chinese: 崔仁; Korean: 최인; born 19 January 1989 in Yanji) is a Chinese former footballer who played as a midfielder.

== Club career ==
Cui Ren was promoted to China League One side Yanbian FC in 2007. On 29 March 2009, he made his senior debut in a 2–1 away defeat against Shanghai East Asia. On 26 September 2009, he scored his first senior goal in a 3–1 away defeat against Sichuan FC. Cui was linked with another League One club Qingdao Hainiu by the end of 2013 season; however, Yanbian refused his transfer request.

On 9 February 2015, Cui moved to Chinese Super League side Shanghai Shenxin on a free transfer. He made his Super League debut on 15 March 2015, in the second match of the season against Shanghai SIPG, coming on as a substitute for Everton.

On 1 January 2016, Cui returned to Yanbian after Shanghai Shenxin's relegation. He transferred to China League One side Zhejiang Greentown on 1 March 2019 after Yanbian Funde was disqualified for the 2019 season due to owing taxes. He would make his debut for Zhejiang in a league game on 10 March 2019 against Qingdao Huanghai in a 2-1 defeat. After three seasons with the club he would aid them to promotion to the top tier at the end of the 2021 campaign. Cui retired from professional football at the end of the 2021 season after being unable to recover from a cruciate ligament tear and cartilage damage.

== Career statistics ==
Statistics accurate as of match played 27 April 2022.

Appearances and goals by club, season and competition
Club	Season	League			National Cup		Continental		Other		Total	
Club	Season	Division	Apps	Goals	Apps	Goals	Apps	Goals	Apps	Goals	Apps	Goals
Yanbian Changbaishan	2007	China League One	0	0	-		-		-		0	0
Yanbian Changbaishan	2009	China League One	23	2	-		-		-		23	2
Yanbian Changbaishan	2010	China League One	14	1	-		-		-		14	1
Yanbian Changbaishan	2011	China League One	23	3	3	0	-		-		26	3
Yanbian Changbaishan	2012	China League One	13	2	1	0	-		-		14	2
Yanbian Changbaishan	2013	China League One	22	4	0	0	-		-		22	4
Yanbian Changbaishan	2014	China League One	26	4	1	0	-		-		27	4
Yanbian Changbaishan	Total		121	16	5	0	0	0	0	0	126	16
Shanghai Shenxin	2015	Chinese Super League	8	0	0	0	-		-		8	0
Yanbian Funde	2016	Chinese Super League	17	2	0	0	-		-		17	2
Yanbian Funde	2017	Chinese Super League	20	2	1	0	-		-		21	2
Yanbian Funde	2018	China League One	25	8	1	1	-		-		26	9
Yanbian Funde	Total		62	12	2	1	0	0	0	0	64	13
Zhejiang Greentown	2019	China League One	25	2	2	0	-		-		27	2
Zhejiang Greentown	2020	China League One	6	0	1	0	-		2 (Note: Appearance(s) in CSL Relegation play-offs)	0	9	0
Zhejiang Greentown	2021	China League One	6	0	1	0	-		0	0	7	0
Zhejiang Greentown	Total		37	2	4	0	0	0	2	0	43	2
Career total			228	30	11	1	0	0	2	0	241	31
