= Hagongda Stadium =

Multi-purpose stadium in Harbin, China

Coordinates: 45°44′12″N 126°37′42″E

Hagongda Stadium (Simplified Chinese: 哈工大体育场) is a multi-purpose stadium in Harbin Institute of Technology, Harbin, China. It is currently used mostly for football matches and athletics events. It serves as the home stadium for Harbin Yiteng of the Chinese Football Association Jia League. The stadium has a capacity of 30,000 people.
