= Liu Xuanchen =

Chinese association football player

Personal information
- Date of birth: 16 February 1997 (age 29)
- Place of birth: Qingdao, Shandong, China
- Height: 1.88 m (6 ft 2 in)
- Position: Forward

Team information
- Current team: Qingdao Red Lions

Youth career
- –2017: Tianjin Tianhai
- 2018: Xinjiang Tianshan Leopard

Senior career*
Years	Team	Apps	(Gls)
2018	Xinjiang Tianshan Leopard	7	(6)
2019–2021	Guizhou	10	(1)
2022–	Qingdao Red Lions	0	(0)
- * Club domestic league appearances and goals as of 14:01, 29 April 2022 (UTC)

Liu Xuanchen (Chinese: 刘轩辰; born 16 February 1997) is a Chinese footballer who currently plays for Qingdao Red Lions in China League Two.

== Career statistics ==
=== Club ===
As of 24 August 2021.

Club	Season	League			Cup		Other		Total	
Club	Season	Division	Apps	Goals	Apps	Goals	Apps	Goals	Apps	Goals
Xinjiang Tianshan Leopard	2018	China League One	7	6	0	0	0	0	7	6
Guizhou	2019	China League One	2	0	1 (Note: Appearances in the Chinese FA Cup)	0	0	0	3	1
Guizhou	2020	China League One	0	0	0	0	0	0	0	0
Guizhou	2021	China League One	2	1	1	0	0	0	3	1
Guizhou	Total		4	1	2	1	0	0	6	2
Career total			11	7	2	1	0	0	13	8
