= Liaoning Guangyuan FC =

Liaoning Guangyuan
- Full name: Liaoning Guangyuan Football Club
- Nickname: Liao Tigerlings
- Founded: 2007
- Dissolved: 2008
- Ground: Queenstown Stadium; Queenstown, Singapore
- Capacity: 5,000
- League: S.League
- 2007: S.League, 10th of 12

Liaoning Guangyuan Football Club (Chinese: 辽宁广原足球俱乐部) was a Chinese professional soccer club which played in Singapore's S.League as a foreign team in the 2007 season. The club was a satellite team of the Chinese Super League club Liaoning FC. Players from Liaoning's youth teams made up the majority of Liaoning Guangyuan's S.League squad. The team played their home games at the Queenstown Stadium. They finished in 10th place out of 12 teams in the S.League in 2007.

The club did not participate in the S.League in 2008 as Football Association of Singapore (FAS) did not invite them back for another season.

== History ==
In 2008, FAS decided not to invite Liaoning Guangyuan to participate in the S.League again. They were replaced in the league by Dalian Shide Siwu FC.

== Match-fixing scandal ==
In January 2008, the Singapore media reported that Liaoning Guangyuan's Team Manager, Wang Xin had been arrested following an investigation by Singapore's Corrupt Practices Investigation Bureau into alleged match-fixing. Eight players from the team also had had their passports impounded pending investigations. Shortly after the scandal broke, the Football Association of Singapore announced that it would not be inviting Liaoning Guangyuan to participate in the S.League again in 2008.

Investigations showed that Wang had arranged for a friend in China to place online bets on some of Liaoning Guangyuan's matches through a China-based betting website. He then approached certain players individually and asked them to help ensure the team would lose the match by a particular number of goals in return for bribes.

Wang posted bail amounting to $80,000 and left Singapore for China to attend a court hearing. However, he failed to return to Singapore on 16 January 2008 for a hearing on the charges. He was eventually detained in Shenyang by the China's Police Force in April 2009 following his alleged involvement in a match-fixing scandal in China. Wang was then jailed for 7 Years.

Seven Liaoning Guangyuan players were charged and pleaded guilty to accepting amounts ranging between S$1,200 and S$4,000 from Wang to throw games. Li Xuebai, Li Zheng, Dong Lei, Peng Zhiyi, Tong Di and Zhao Zhipeng received jail sentences of five months, while Wang Lin was sentenced to four months. Each of the six players also received fines ranging from S$2,200 to S$6,200.

== Seasons ==
Season	Pos	P	W	D	L	F	A	Pts	Singapore Cup	Singapore League Cup		
2007	10th	33	8	5	20	33	63	29	Singapore Cup	Singapore League Cup	Preliminary	Withdrew

== Players for 2007 season ==
Note: Flags indicate national team as defined under FIFA eligibility rules; some limited exceptions apply. Players may hold more than one non-FIFA nationality.

No.	Pos.	Nation	Player
1	GK	CHN	Xiao Qin
2	DF	CHN	Li Xuebai
3	DF	CHN	Su Mingtao
4	MF	CHN	Xu Wenbin
5	MF	CHN	Song Lihui
6	MF	CHN	Li Zheng
7	MF	CHN	Zhu Kai
8	FW	CHN	Zhang Haifeng
9	FW	CHN	Li Xinyu
10	FW	CHN	Tong Di
11	MF	CHN	Bu Xin
12	GK	CHN	Wang Haoyi
13	MF	CHN	Gong Yu
14	DF	CHN	Liu Huoming
15	MF	CHN	Xu Kun
