= Zhao Faqing =

Chinese footballer

Zhao Faqing 赵发庆
Personal information
- Full name: Zhao Faqing
- Date of birth: 3 January 1964 (age 62)
- Place of birth: Dalian, Liaoning, China
- Height: 1.83 m (6 ft 0 in)
- Position: Defender

Senior career*
Years	Team	Apps	(Gls)
1982–1995	Liaoning FC		
1996–1998	Qianwei Huandao		
2000	Chongqing Lifan		

International career
1990–1993	China	17	(1)
- 2009–2010: Hunan Billows
- 2011–2012: Chongqing FC
- 2013: Hohhot Dongjin
- 2014–2016: Chengdu Qbao
- 2022: Liaoning Shenyang Urban
- 2024: Dalian K'un City
- 2025: Dalian K'un City
- * Club domestic league appearances and goals

Zhao Faqing (simplified Chinese: 赵发庆; traditional Chinese: 趙發慶; pinyin: Zhào Fāqìng; born 3 January 1964) is a Chinese football coach and former footballer.

== Club career ==
Born in Dalian, Liaoning, Zhao joined provincial team Liaoning FC. During his time with Liaoning, Zhao won one Chinese National League title in 1985 and five Jia-A League titles. In 1996, Zhao joined Qianwei Huandao. Zhao played for the club for three seasons before retiring in 1998 to focus on coaching. In 2000, Zhao briefly came out of retirement to play for the club due to an injury crisis, and renamed Chongqing Lifan following his takeover.

== International career ==
On 3 August 1990, Zhao made his debut for China in a 1–1 draw against South Korea.

=== International goals ===
Scores and results list China's goal tally first.

#	Date	Venue	Opponent	Score	Result	Competition
1	20 June 1993	Chengdu Sports Centre, Chengdu, China	Iraq	2–1	2–1	1994 FIFA World Cup qualification

== Managerial career ==
Zhao began coaching when he was a player at Qianwei Huandao. In 2001, Zhao moved to Shenyang Ginde and became a manager in 2002. In 2007, Zhao became an assistant coach at former club Liaoning, before becoming a player for Hunan Billows in 2009. On June 21, 2011, Zhao was announced the manager of Chongqing. During the 2013 China League Two season, Zhao managed Shenyang Dongjin following the club's relegation from the China League One. In 2014, Zhao was appointed a manager of Nanjing Qianbao, and remained in the club for a season after their relocation to Chengdu.

In February 2019, following a stint as coaching at Inner Mongolia Zhongyou, Zhao was named as one of the coaching staff at Dalian Chanjoy.
