= Fu Bo (footballer) =

Chinese footballer and manager

Fu Bo 傅博
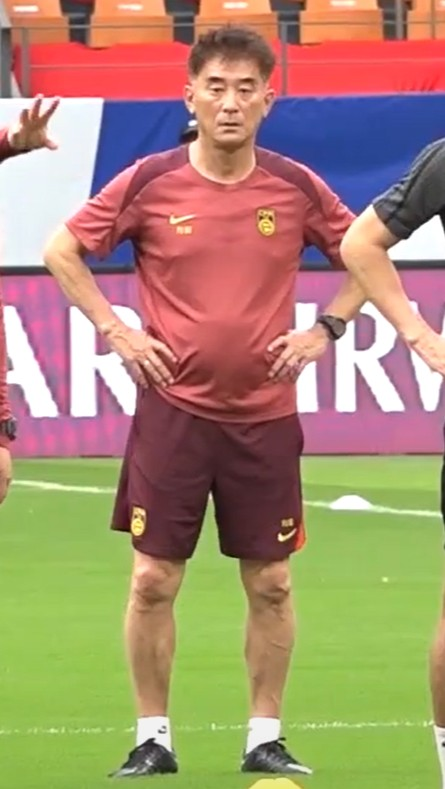
- Fu Bo in June 2025

Personal information
- Full name: Fu Bo
- Date of birth: 28 February 1965 (age 61)
- Place of birth: Shenyang, Liaoning, China
- Height: 1.75 m (5 ft 9 in)
- Position: Midfielder

Team information
- Current team: Zhejiang FC (assistant)

Youth career
- Liaoning FC

Senior career*
Years	Team	Apps	(Gls)
1984–1995	Liaoning FC		
1996	Shenyang Sealion		
1997	Shenzhen Ping An		(1)

Managerial career
- 2003–2014: Liaoning Whowin (assistant)
- 2009–2013: China (assistant)
- 2012–2016: China U-22
- 2013–2014: China (caretaker)
- 2014–2016: China (assistant)
- 2017–2018: Guangzhou Evergrande (assistant)
- 2018–2019: Guangdong South China Tiger
- 2022–2023: Guangzhou FC (technical director)
- 2024–2025: China (technical director)
- 2026–: Zhejiang FC (assistant)
Medal record
Men's football
Representing China
AFC Youth Championship
Gold medal – first place	1985 Abu Dhabi	Team
- * Club domestic league appearances and goals

Fu Bo (Chinese: 傅博; pinyin: Fù Bó; Mandarin pronunciation: [fû pwǒ]; born February 28, 1965) is a Chinese football manager as well as also being a former footballer who was predominantly a midfielder.

== Playing career ==
Fu Bo would start his football career with his local football team Liaoning F.C. and with them go on to be part of the squad that won the 1985 league title. With Liaoning Fu would be part of the team that dominated the Chinese game and won several leagues, cups as well as 1989-90 Asian Club Championship. While he may have been part of the squad that saw Liaoning dominate Chinese football as well as gain full-professionalism Fu did not gain an international cap and retired a year after once Liaoning were relegated at the end of the 1995 Chinese league campaign.

== Coaching career ==
Along with former Chinese international footballer Su Maozhen, Fu Bo went abroad on September 3, 2007 to Cologne, Germany to gain his coaching badges. This would eventually lead to Fu gaining an assistant coaching job with the Chinese national team when Gao Hongbo became the head coach in 2009. After several years Fu was trusted enough to go on lead the team on a one-off occasion in a friendly match against New Zealand on March 25, 2011 that ended in a 1-1 draw. While he would soon return to his assistant duties Fu would have a new head coach to work under when José Antonio Camacho took over the team on August 13, 2011. As well as working under Camacho, Fu was also promoted to be the head coach of the China U-22 team in 2012. After a series of disappointing results Camacho was fired and Fu took on the national team on a caretaker basis. He was eventually succeeded by Frenchman Alain Perrin. On 27 March 2017, Fu was appointed the assistant coach of Chinese Super League side Guangzhou Evergrande. On 25 September 2018, he had his contract terminated by mutual consent. The next day Fu moved to China League One club Meixian Techand as their head coach.

== China results ==
#	Date	Venue	Opponent	Result	Goalscorers	Competition
1	July 21, 2013	Seoul, South Korea	Japan	3–3	Wang Yongpo (P x2) & Sun Ke	2013 EAFF East Asian Cup
2	July 24, 2013	Hwaseong, South Korea	South Korea	0–0	Yu Hanchao & Gao Di	2013 EAFF East Asian Cup
3	July 28, 2013	Seoul, South Korea	Australia	4–3	Yu Dabao, Sun Ke, Yang Xu, Wu Lei	2013 EAFF East Asian Cup
4	September 6, 2013	Tianjin, China	Singapore	6–1	Yu Dabao x2, Zhang Xizhe (P), Sun Ke & Zheng Long x2	Friendly
5	September 10, 2013	Tianjin, China	Malaysia	2–0	Zheng Long & Yang Xu	Friendly
6	October 15, 2013	Jakarta, Indonesia	Indonesia	1–1	Wu Xi	2015 AFC Asian Cup qualification
7	November 15, 2013	Xi'an, China	Indonesia	1–0	Wu Lei	2015 AFC Asian Cup qualification
8	November 19, 2013	Xi'an, China	Saudi Arabia	0–0		2015 AFC Asian Cup qualification
9	March 5, 2014	Sharjah, United Arab Emirates	Iraq	1–3	Zhang Xizhe (P)	2015 AFC Asian Cup qualification

== Managerial statistics ==
As of 5 March 2014

Team	From	To	Record				
Team	From	To	G	W	D	L	Win %
China	July 2013	February 2014	9	4	4	1	44.44
Total			9	4	4	1	44.44

== Honours ==
=== As a player ===
Liaoning FC

- Chinese Jia-A League: 1985, 1987, 1988, 1990, 1991, 1993
- Chinese FA Cup: 1984, 1986
- Asian Club Championship: 1989–1990
