= Shaoxing China Textile City Sports Center =

Association football stadium in Zhejiang, China

China Textile City Sports Center
- 中国轻纺城体育中心
- Interactive map of China Textile City Sports Center
- Full name: Shaoxing China Textile City Sports Center 绍兴中国轻纺城体育中心
- Location: Shaoxing, Zhejiang, China
- Coordinates: 30°05′56.6″N 120°29′40.7″E
- Owner: Shaoxing People's Government
- Operator: Shaoxing Sports Bureau
- Capacity: 40,000 (20,000 for Zhejiang Yiteng matches)
- Surface: Grass

Construction
- Built: July 2011
- Opened: June 2014
- Cost: ¥1.868 billion

Tenant
- Zhejiang Yiteng

The Shaoxing China Textile City Sports Centre Stadium (Chinese: 绍兴中国轻纺城体育中心) is a multi-purpose, retractable roof stadium in Shaoxing, Zhejiang, China. It was opened in 2014 for the 2014 Provincial Games of Zhejiang. It became the home stadium of China League One side Zhejiang Yiteng in 2016.
