= Di You =

Chinese footballer

Di You 邸佑
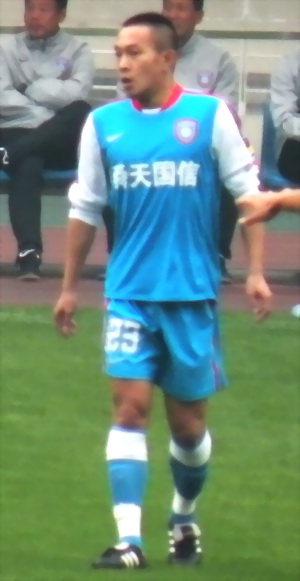

Personal information
- Full name: Di You
- Date of birth: 26 November 1983 (age 42)
- Place of birth: Baoding, Hebei, China
- Height: 1.75 m (5 ft 9 in)
- Position: Midfielder

Youth career
- 1989–1991: Baoding Amateur Sports School
- 1999–2001: Bayi

Senior career*
Years	Team	Apps	(Gls)
2002–2003	Bayi	8	(0)
2004–2008	Wuhan Optics Valley	41	(4)
2009	Shanghai Zobon	11	(0)
2010	Jiangsu Sainty	23	(0)
2011	Chongqing F.C.	23	(7)
2012–2013	Shenzhen Fengpeng	39	(6)
2014	Shenyang Dongjin	7	(1)
2014–2015	Taiyuan Zhongyou Jiayi	17	(3)
2015–2018	Baoding Yingli ETS	65	(13)
- * Club domestic league appearances and goals as of 13 October 2018

Di You (Chinese: 邸佑; pinyin: Dǐ Yòu; born 26 November 1983) is a former Chinese footballer who played as a midfielder.

== Club career ==
Di You started his professional football career with top-tier Chinese club Bayi Football Team, a football team under the sport branch of the Chinese Army. With Bayi he would gradually establish himself as a squad player within the team; however, before he had a chance to further establish himself within the squad, the club were relegated at the end of the 2003 league season and decided to disband. Di would transfer to second-tier club Wuhan Optics Valley in 2004 where he was reunited with his former manager at Bayi, Pei Encai. Di's time in Wuhan would be extremely productive and he was not only part of the team that won the 2004 Chinese league one title and promotion to the Chinese Super League but was also part of the team that went on to win the 2005 Chinese Super League Cup as well.

Di's time at Wuhan would suddenly come to an abrupt end when the Wuhan management did not accept the punishment given to them by the Chinese Football Association after a scuffle broke out during a league game against Beijing Guoan on 27 September 2008 and the club quit the league for unfair punishment. Once again Di would have to find a new club to play for and joined second-tier football club Shanghai Zobon at the beginning of the 2009 league season. After a season with them Di had the chance to return to the top tier with Jiangsu Sainty as well as another reunion with Pei Encai, however after only a season at the club Di was allowed to leave. In 2011, he would join third-tier club Chongqing F.C. where he actually won promotion with them, however despite this he would leave the club to join another third-tier club in Shenzhen Fengpeng in 2012.

In March 2014, Di transferred to China League Two side Shenyang Dongjin.

On 1 July 2015, Di transferred to China League Two side Baoding Yingli ETS.

On 13 October 2018, Di You announced his retirement from professional football.

== Honours ==
Wuhan Optics Valley

- China League One: 2004
- Chinese Super League Cup: 2005
