= Meixian Tsang Hin-chi Stadium =

Sports venue in Meizhou, Guangdong, China

Coordinates: 24.2752708045°N 116.0781428717°E

Tsang Hin-chi Stadium 曾宪梓体育场
- Interactive map of Tsang Hin-chi Stadium 曾宪梓体育场
- Full name: Meizhou Meixian Tsang Hin-chi Stadium 梅州市梅县区曾宪梓体育场
- Location: Meizhou, Guangdong, China
- Owner: Meizhou People's Government
- Operator: Meizhou Sports Bureau
- Capacity: 20,221
- Surface: Grass

Construction
- Built: October 2010
- Opened: February 2012
- Cost: ¥280 million

Tenant
- Meizhou Meixian Techand

Meixian Tsang Hin-chi Stadium (Chinese: 梅县曾宪梓体育场; pinyin: Méixiàn Zēngxiànzǐ Tǐyùchǎng) is a multi-purpose stadium in Meixian District, Meizhou, Guangdong, China. It was opened in 2012 with capacity of 20,221.

The stadium is named after Meixian-born Hong Kong charitarian Tsang Hin-chi, who donated ¥15 million for construction of the stadium.
