= Chongqing F.C. =

Chinese football club

Chongqing F.C. 重庆FC
- Full name: Chongqing Football Club 重庆足球俱乐部
- Founded: December 30, 2010
- Dissolved: December 21, 2013
- Ground: Olympic Sports Center, Chongqing
- Capacity: 58,680
Home colours	Away colours

Chongqing Football Club or Chongqing F.C. (Simplified Chinese: 重庆足球俱乐部) was a Chinese professional football club based in Chongqing. The club last played in the China League One before dissolution.

== History ==
Chongqing F.C., the second club of Chongqing, was established by Chongqing Football Management Center on December 30, 2010.

The club then started to play in the 2011 China League Two. In their search for first head coach, Pei Encai attracted Chongqing's attention. Pei was the manager of Chinese Super League club Jiangsu Sainty who had ended the Season 2010 on 11th place. Chongqing F.C. signed Pei Encai along with some of his players at Jiangsu, Di You, Zhi Yaqi, Wang Yang and Wang Xiang. Following a poor run of results, Pei stood down as head coach of Chongqing F.C. and was replaced by Zhao Faqing on June 21, 2011. The club signed some former Chinese Super League players such as Zheng Wei, Ma Xiaolei and Guo Mingyue during the summer transfer window. In the end, they came second in the South Division of 2011 China League Two and qualified for the play-off stage. They went on to win both their legs of the quarter-finals against Shandong Youth, and gained promotion to China League One after brushing aside Dongguan Nancheng in the semi-finals. They advanced to the final but narrowly lost in the penalty shoot-out against the eventual champions Harbin Songbei Yiteng.

The club was dissolved due to relegation and being short of funds in December 2013.

== Results ==
- As of the end of 2013 season

All-time League Rankings

Season	2011	2012	2013
Division	3	2	2
Position	2	8	15

== Managers ==
- (China) Pei Encai (2011)
- (China) Zhao Faqing (2011–2012)
- (China) Zhao Changhong (2012–2013)
- (China) Wei Xin (2013)
- (Portugal) Manuel Cajuda (2013)
