= Guangdong South China Tiger F.C. =

Chinese football club

Guangdong South China Tiger Guǎngdōng Huánánhǔ 广东华南虎
- Full name: Guangdong South China Tiger Football Club 广东华南虎足球俱乐部
- Founded: 3 July 2003; 22 years ago
- Dissolved: 3 February 2020; 5 years ago
- Ground: Meixian Tsang Hin-chi Stadium, Meizhou, Guangdong, China PR
- Capacity: 20,221
- Owner(s): Shenzhen Techand Ecological Environment Co., Ltd.
- League: China League One
- 2019: League One, 11th
Home colours	Away colours

Guangdong South China Tiger Football Club (simplified Chinese: 广东华南虎足球俱乐部; traditional Chinese: 廣東華南虎足球俱樂部; pinyin: Guǎngdōng Huánánhǔ Zúqiú Jùlèbù; Jyutping: Gwong2 dung1 Waa4 naam4 fu2 Zuk1 kau4 Keoi1 lok6 bou6; Hakka Chinese:Kwong3 Tung1 Fa2 nam2 fu3 Zuk7 kiu2 Ki1 ngok8 pu3) or simply Guangdong South China Tiger (simplified Chinese: 广东华南虎; traditional Chinese: 廣東華南虎; Jyutping: Gwong2 dung1 waa4 naam4 fu2; Hakka Chinese:Kwong3 tung1 fa2 nam2 fu3) was a professional Chinese football club that last participated in China League One. The team was based in Meixian District, Meizhou, Guangdong and their home stadium was the Meixian Tsang Hin-chi Stadium. Their majority shareholder was engineering, and construction company Shenzhen Techand Ecological Environment Co., Ltd.

== History ==
The club was founded on 3 July 2003 as Dongguan Nancheng F.C. (Simplified Chinese: 东莞南城足球俱乐部; Traditional Chinese: 東莞南城足球俱樂部; Hakka Chinese:Tung1 Ngan2 Nam2 Shin2 Zuk7 kiu2 Ki1 ngok8 pu3) by the Dongguan City Sports Bureau who created them as a Phoenix club to Guangdong Hongyuan F.C. who were sold-off and moved cities in 2001. The club would then gain entry to participate within the 2003–04 Hong Kong First Division League as a foreign team within the league. The Dongguan City Sports Bureau gained sponsorship and investment from real estate developers South City Real Estate Development Company, Guangdong Hongyuan Real Estate Development Company, Guangdong Enterprises Group Co., Ltd., China Everbright, Huang City Development Co., Ltd., Dongguan City Royal Garden residential construction Limited, Carnation New Garden Construction Co., Ltd., The new Bank of Development and Construction Co., Ltd., Dongguan Kuari Footwear Holdings Limited and Dongguan CITIC Group before participating within the league where they finished sixth. The club only spent one season within the Hong Kong league, which was mired by their on-field disciplinary issues against Buler Rangers on March 7, 2004, that saw nine players from Dongguan Nancheng and six from Buler Rangers suspended for their behaviour. After the season ended the club deciding to switch to the Chinese league system in the 2005 league season where they started within the third tier. In the campaign they topped the group stages and reached the semi-final within the play-off's where they lost 3–2 to Nancheng Bayi Hengyuan in extra time, missing out on promotion. After that disappointment the club pulled out of the league and disbanded their first team, however they still maintained their youth system after the season ended.

The club rejoined the China League Two division in 2011 and made significant changes to the club, such as changing their home ground to Dongguan Nancheng Sports Park Stadium, altering their uniforms from red to yellow tops with blue shorts, building a new squad from their existing youth team, changes that saw the club reach the semi-finals of the division play-offs. The club moved to the city of Meizhou and changed their name as Meixian Hakka F.C. on 12 December 2012 making them the first professional football club in Meizhou, which the city like to proclaim as the "Homeland of football" in China due to it being where the Europeans introduced Association football to the country as well as paying homage to the former Chinese footballer and coach Lee Wai Tong who grew up there. This was followed by a move into Meixian Tsang Hin-chi Stadium and a new Head coach in Hirokazu Sakuma. In March 2015 engineering, and construction company Shenzhen Techand Ecological Environment Co., Ltd. took over the club. Once again the club changed its name to Meizhou Meixian Hakka F.C. in January 2016. On 30 December 2016, they changed their name to Meizhou Meixian Techand F.C. so as not to be confused with local rivals Meizhou Hakka F.C. A new badge, a change in home colours to red over the previous yellow tops and blue shorts would complete their transformation of the club. In the 2017 league season under the management of Li Haiqiang the club came runners-up to Heilongjiang Lava Spring F.C. in the division and gained promotion to the second tier for the first time, which saw the players given a bonus of £2.86 million.

The club deleted the owner's information from their name and changed to Guangdong South China Tiger F.C. in answer to Chinese FA's new regulation in January 2019. The club announced its dissolution in February 2020.

== Name history ==
- 2003–2012 Dongguan Nancheng F.C. 东莞南城/東莞南城
- 2013–2015 Meixian Hakka F.C. 梅县客家/梅縣客家
- 2016 Meizhou Meixian Hakka F.C. 梅州梅县客家/梅州梅縣客家
- 2017–2018 Meizhou Meixian Techand F.C. 梅州梅县铁汉/梅州梅縣鐵漢
- 2019–2020 Guangdong South China Tiger F.C. 广东华南虎/廣東華南虎

== Managerial history ==
- (China) Li Hu (2011)
- (Croatia) Goran Paulic (2012)
- (Japan) Hirokazu Sakuma (2013)
- (Japan) Tomoo Tsukoshi (2014)
- (China) Wang Hongwei (2015–2016)
- (Hong Kong) Li Haiqiang (2017)
- (Spain) Juan Ignacio Martínez (2018)
- (China) Fu Bo (2018–2020)

== Results ==
All-time league rankings

As of the end of 2019 season.

Year	Div	Pld	W	D	L	GF	GA	GD	Pts	Pos.	FA Cup	Super Cup	AFC	Att./G	Stadium
2003/04^{1}	1	18	5	5	8	25	31	−8	20	6	R1	DNQ	DNQ		Dongguan Stadium
2005	3	19	11	4	4	30	14	16	29	3	DNE	DNQ	DNQ		Dongguan Stadium
2011	3	25	11	7	7	32	21	11	36^{2}	4	DNE	DNQ	DNQ		Dongguan Nancheng Sports Park Stadium
2012	3	24	12	4	8	41	30	11	40	6^{2}	DNE	DNQ	DNQ	1,488	Dongguan Nancheng Sports Park, Meixian Tsang Hin-chi Stadium
2013	3	14	4	3	7	11	20	−9	15^{2}	7	R1	DNQ	DNQ		Meixian Tsang Hin-chi Stadium
2014	3	16	7	4	5	25	20	5	25	5^{2}	R2	DNQ	DNQ		Meixian Tsang Hin-chi Stadium
2015	3	16	7	6	3	15	9	6	24^{2}	5	R1	DNQ	DNQ		Meixian Tsang Hin-chi Stadium
2016	3	20	8	11	1	26	17	9	35	7	R2	DNQ	DNQ	5,219	Meixian Tsang Hin-chi Stadium
2017	3	27	15	4	8	39	27	12	49	RU	R3	DNQ	DNQ	3,863	Meixian Tsang Hin-chi Stadium
2018	2	30	8	10	12	41	44	−3	34	14	R3	DNQ	DNQ	6,550	Meixian Tsang Hin-chi Stadium
2019	2	30	10	6	14	41	50	-9	36	11	R3	DNQ	DNQ		Meixian Tsang Hin-chi Stadium

Dongguan Nancheng didn't compete in 2006–2010.

- ^1 At Hong Kong First Division League
- ^2 In group stage.

Key

	China top division
	China second division
	China third division
W	Winners
RU	Runners-up
3	Third place
	Relegated

- Pld = Played
- W = Games won
- D = Games drawn
- L = Games lost
- F = Goals for
- A = Goals against
- Pts = Points
- Pos = Final position
- DNQ = Did not qualify
- DNE = Did not enter
- NH = Not Held
- – = Does Not Exist
- R1 = Round 1
- R2 = Round 2
- R3 = Round 3
- R4 = Round 4
- F = Final
- SF = Semi-finals
- QF = Quarter-finals
- R16 = Round of 16
- Group = Group stage
- GS2 = Second Group stage
- QR1 = First Qualifying Round
- QR2 = Second Qualifying Round
- QR3 = Third Qualifying Round

== See also ==
- Guangdong Winnerway F.C.
