= Shaoxing Keqiao Yuejia F.C. =

Chinese football club

Shaoxing Keqiao Yuejia Shàoxīng Kēqiáo Yuèjiǎ 绍兴柯桥越甲
- Full name: Shaoxing Keqiao Yuejia Football Club 绍兴柯桥越甲足球俱乐部
- Founded: 1988; 38 years ago (Amateur); 1994 (Professional)
- Dissolved: 25 April 2022; 4 years ago
- Ground: Shaoxing China Textile City Sports Center
- Capacity: 20,000
- Chairman: Cui Yi 崔毅
- League: Chinese Champions League
- 2021: League Two, 22nd of 24 (relegated)
- Website: yitengfc.com
Home colours	Away colours

Shaoxing Keqiao Yuejia Football Club (simplified Chinese: 绍兴柯桥越甲; traditional Chinese: 紹興柯橋越甲; pinyin: Shàoxīng Kēqiáo Yuèjiǎ) were a professional Chinese football club that participates in the China League Two division under licence from the Chinese Football Association (CFA). The team is based in Shaoxing, Zhejiang and their home stadium is the Shaoxing China Textile City Sports Center that has a seating capacity of 20,000. Their majority shareholder is Cui Yi (崔毅) and the Yiteng Group.

They were founded as an amateur team in 1988 and called Dalian Tielu. They took part in China's national leagues before becoming a professional team when the Yiteng Group gained ownership of the club. After years of stagnation the club was moved to Harbin where they have since predominantly remained and gained their first silverware, which was the 2011 China League Two title. Since then, they gradually improved their league standing and gained promotion to China's top tier when they came second within the 2013 China League One division.

== History ==
In April 1988 the club was established as Dalian Tielu and soon joined the Chinese national leagues at the bottom of the pyramid in the third tier at the beginning of the 1989 league season. After the team's debut performance the club's appearances within the national leagues became sporadic because they were an amateur team at a time when the league was being restructured as a fully professional unit. When professionalism arrived to the Chinese leagues in the 1994 league season, the club had started being funded by the Yiteng Group on February of that year. The funding helped to establish them as semi-professional unit and then soon after a fully professional team in the third division. Xu Yin and Cheng Xianfei were appointed as joint managers. They came third in the league and were promoted to the second tier.

The club's time in the second tier was not a success and at the end of the 1995 league season they finished tenth in the league and were relegated back into the third division. The Yiteng Group took full control of the club in 1996, and by the following season merged the team with local rivals Dalian Shunfa. With the merger the owners were hoping for promotion and by the 1999 league campaign they believed that they had assembled a squad capable of achieving this. They did not reach the division play-offs that season because Mianyang F.C. had exactly the same points and goal difference as them after the last-placed odd number team was taken out of the equation. The Chinese Football Association decided that the only way to settle the issue was that the two teams should draw lots to see who would qualify for the play-offs, with Mianyang winning in the end. The chairman Cui Yi and the Yiteng Group were so aggrieved that they decided to pull out of the competition the following season and sold their squad to Dalian Shide F.C. for 8 million Yuan.

After the Yiteng Group had formed significant business ties within Harbin, Heilongjiang, Cui Yi decided that it was a good time for the club to re-enter the national leagues on December 20, 2005. They registered with the Chinese FA the new name of the club called Harbin Yiteng and took part at the bottom of the Chinese pyramid in the third tier for the start of the 2006 Chinese league two division. The club moved in the 30,000 capacity Hagongda Stadium and they quickly won promotion at the end of the season after coming runners-up to Beijing BIT. The club struggled in the division and had a Chinese record sixteen game winless streak, however the team were able to avoid relegated that season. They moved to Yantai in Shandong in March 2008 and played in the 45,000 capacity Yantai Sports Park Stadium. They also replaced their red kit with a new all-blue outfit, however the changes did not work and they were relegated at the end of the 2008 league season. They briefly moved back to Dalian until April 1, 2011, when they returned to Harbin where their fortunes changed and they won their first championship, the 2011 China League Two division, and promotion back into the second division. Under Duan Xin reign as manager Harbin continued their good form in the second tier and at the end of the 2013 league season he would guide the club to second within the division and promotion to the top tier for the first time in their history.

At the start of the start of the 2014 Chinese Super League, former assistant Wang Helong was promoted to Head coach while Duan Xin remained as manager. The club started in the Chinese Super League with a nine-game losing streak. It ended on the 4 May 2014 when they beat local rivals Changchun Yatai 3–1 to claim their first top flight win, thanks to goals from Dori, Han Deming and Ricardo Steer. On 19 July 2014 Marijo Tot was brought in as the new head coach, however he was unable to reverse the club's fortunes and the team were relegated at the end of the season.

Yiteng F.C. moved to Shaoxing and changed their name as Zhejiang Yiteng F.C. in the 2016 season. In October 2018, when Yiteng back to Harbin and play with Heilongjiang F.C., they experienced a horrible treatment from fans. People called them "go back to Dalian idiots", and the game result ended with 1:1. In January 2019, they relegated to the third-tier after failing to apply a League One license, despite finishing 12th in the last season.

== Ownership and naming history ==
Year	Owner	Club name	Sponsored team name
1988–93	Dalian Railway Bureau	Dalian Tielu Football Team	
1994	Dalian Railway Bureau	Dalian Tielu Football Team	Dalian Lichuang
1995	Dalian Railway Bureau	Dalian Tielu Football Team	Dalian Tielu Yiteng
1996	Yiteng Group	Dalian Yiteng Liantie Football Club	
1997	Yiteng Group	Dalian Yiteng Football Club	Anshan Yiteng Liantie
1998–2005	Yiteng Group	Dalian Yiteng Football Club	
2006	Yiteng Group	Dalian Yiteng Football Club	Harbin Pharmaceutical Group Yiteng
2007	Yiteng Group	Dalian Yiteng Football Club	Harbin Yiteng
2008	Yiteng Group	Dalian Yiteng Football Club	Yantai Yiteng
2009–10	Yiteng Group	Dalian Yiteng Football Club	
2011–12	Yiteng Group	Dalian Yiteng Football Club	Harbin Songbei Yiteng
2013–15	Yiteng Group	Harbin Yiteng Football Club	
2016–20	Yiteng Group	Zhejiang Yiteng Football Club	
2021–2022	Yiteng Group	Shaoxing Keqiao Yuejia Football Club	

== Managerial history ==
Information correct as of end of 2015 league season.

- (China) Xu Yin 徐来贤 and (China) Cheng Xianfei 程显飞 1994–1999
- (China) Li Hongwu 李洪武 March 2006 – May 2006
- (China) Wang Jun 王军 May 2006 – March 2007
- (China) Wang Hongli 王洪礼 March 2007 – April 2007
- (China) Wang Jun 王军 April 2007
- (South Korea) Cho Yoon-hwan 赵允焕 April 2007 – June 2007
- (China) Wang Jun 王军 June 2007 – Nov 2007
- (China) Gai Zengjun 盖增君 Nov 2007 – June 2008
- (China) Wang Jun 王军 June 2008 – June 2010
- (China) Duan Xin 段鑫 13 June 2010 – March 2014
- (China) Wang Helong 王贺龙 March 2014–19 July 2014
- (Croatia) Marijo Tot 马里奥·托特 19 July 2014 – 31 December 2014
- (China) Duan Xin 段鑫 (caretaker) 31 December 2014 – 5 June 2015
- (China) Gai Zengjun 盖增君 (caretaker) 5 June 2015 – 17 June 2015
- (China) Duan Xin 段鑫 17 June 2015 – December 2015
- (Croatia) Goran Tomić 戈兰·托米奇 10 Jan 2016 – 22 Mar 2016
- (China) Duan Xin 段鑫 (caretaker) 22 Mar 2016 –1 Dec 2016
- (Brazil) Maurício Copertino 毛里西奥·科佩尔蒂诺 1 Dec 2016 –28 May 2017
- (China) Wang Jun 王军 (caretaker) 28 May 2017 –6 June 2017
- (Croatia) Marijo Tot 马里奥·托特 6 June 2017 –2 January 2018
- (Brazil) Maurício Copertino 毛里西奥·科佩尔蒂诺 2 January 2018 –24 September 2018
- (China) Hu Zhaojun 胡兆军 (caretaker) 24 September 2018 – 3 March 2019
- (England) Giles Stille 吉尔斯·斯蒂尔 3 March 2019–6 January 2021

== Honours ==
- China League Two (Third Tier League)

Winners (1) : 2011

== Results ==
- As of the end of 2019 season.

All-time League Rankings

Year	Tier	Pld	W	D	L	GF	GA	GD	Pts	Pos	Cup	Asia	Avg league att	Stadium
1989	3									5	NH	DNQ		Dalian Locomotive stadium
1991	3									5^{1}	DNQ	DNQ		Dalian Locomotive stadium
1994	3	8	3	5	0	20	15	+5	6^{2}	3	NH	DNQ		Dalian Locomotive stadium
1995	2	22	6	4	12	20	36	−16	22	10	DNQ	DNQ		Dalian Locomotive stadium
1996	3	3^{2}	0	0	3	4	7	−3	0	4^{2}	DNQ	DNQ		Dalian Locomotive stadium
1997	3	3^{2}	1	0	2	5	5	0	3	3^{2}	DNQ	DNQ		Dalian Locomotive stadium
1998	3									3	DNQ	DNQ		Dalian Locomotive stadium
1999	3	10	3	5	2	11	8	+3	14	3^{2}	DNQ	DNQ		Dalian Locomotive stadium
2006	3	16	9	5	2	26	16	+10	32	2	DNQ	DNQ		Hagongda Stadium
2007	2	24	4	7	13	18	36	+18	19	12	NH	DNQ		Hagongda Stadium
2008	2	24	5	10	9	28	35	−7	25	13	NH	DNQ		City Sports Centre
2009	3	12	4	2	6	17	15	+2	14	5^{1}	NH	DNQ		Liaoning Normal University
2010	3	21	9	6	6	28	22	+6	27^{1}	4	NH	DNQ		Liaoning Normal University
2011	3	19	14	2	3	38	9	+29	36^{1}	W	DNQ	DNQ		Harbin ICE Sports Center
2012	2	30	13	6	11	53	43	+10	45	4	R2	DNQ	4,002	Harbin ICE Sports Center
2013	2	30	18	6	6	55	29	+26	60	2	R3	DNQ	6,540	Harbin ICE Sports Center
2014	1	30	5	6	19	35	56	−21	21	16	R3	DNQ	26,126	Harbin ICE Sports Center
2015	2	30	11	14	5	43	31	12	47	5	R2	DNQ	20,477	Harbin ICE Sports Center
2016	2	30	11	5	14	39	49	−10	38	13	R2	DNQ	2,351	Shaoxing China Textile City Sports Center
2017	2	30	8	8	14	35	46	−11	32	13	R2	DNQ	4,005	Shaoxing China Textile City Sports Center
2018	2	30	10	7	13	43	53	−10	37	12^{3}	R3	DNQ	3,730	Shaoxing China Textile City Sports Center
2019	3	30	12	5	13	34	41	−7	41^{1}	16	R3	DNQ		Shaoxing China Textile City Sports Center

Yiteng didn't compete in 1990, 1992–1993 and 2000–2005.

- ^1 in group stage.
- ^2 in Final round group stage.
- ^3 fail to apply League One license.

Key

	China top division
	China second division
	China third division
W	Winners
RU	Runners-up
3	Third place
	Relegated

- Pld = Played
- W = Games won
- D = Games drawn
- L = Games lost
- F = Goals for
- A = Goals against
- Pts = Points
- Pos = Final position
- DNQ = Did not qualify
- DNE = Did not enter
- NH = Not Held
- R1 = Round 1
- R2 = Round 2
- R3 = Round 3
- R4 = Round 4
- F = Final
- SF = Semi-finals
- QF = Quarter-finals
- R16 = Round of 16
- Group = Group stage
- GS2 = Second Group stage
- QR1 = First Qualifying Round
- QR2 = Second Qualifying Round
- QR3 = Third Qualifying Round

== Notable players ==
Had international caps for their respective countries.

Asia

- (South Korea) Wang Jung-hyun
