= 2016 China League Two =

China League Two
- Season: 2016
- Champions: Lijiang Jiayunhao
- Promoted: Lijiang Jiayunhao; Baoding Yingli ETS
- Matches: 206
- Goals: 480 (2.33 per match)
- Top goalscorer: Zhang Shuang (14 goals)
- Biggest home win: Shenzhen Renren 6-1 Baotou Nanjiao (Sept. 17th, 2016) (5 goals)
- Biggest away win: 6 matches (3 goals)
- Highest scoring: Jiangsu Yancheng Dingli 3-5 Hainan Boying & Seamen (Sept. 10th, 2016) (8 goals)

The 2016 Chinese Football Association Division Two League season was the 27th season since its establishment in 1989. It was divided into two groups, North and South. The league was expanded to 20 teams, with 10 teams in North Group and 10 teams in South Group.

== Team changes ==
=== To League Two ===
Teams relegated from 2015 China League One

- Beijing BIT
- Jiangxi Liansheng

Teams entered from 2015 China Amateur Football League

- Suzhou Dongwu
- Hainan Seamen
- Shenzhen Renren
- Shenyang City

=== From League Two ===
Teams promoted to 2016 China League One

- Meizhou Kejia
- Dalian Transcendence

=== Name changes ===
- Hainan Seamen F.C. changed their name to Hainan Boying & Seamen F.C. in December 2015.
- Nanjing Qianbao F.C. moved to the city of Chengdu and changed their name to Chengdu Qbao F.C. in January 2016.
- Yunnan Wanhao F.C. moved to the city of Shanghai and changed their name to Shanghai JuJu Sports F.C. in January 2016.
- Meixian Hakka F.C. changed their name to Meizhou Meixian Hakka F.C. in January 2016.
- Shenyang City F.C. changed their name to Shenyang Urban F.C. in March 2016.

=== Other changes ===
- Jiangsu Yancheng Dingli F.C. took over the place of Fujian Broncos F.C. in January 2016.
- Heilongjiang Lava Spring F.C. took over the place of Anhui Litian F.C. in January 2016.
- Nantong Zhiyun F.C. took over the place of Guangxi Longguida F.C. in January 2016.

== Clubs ==
=== Clubs and locations ===
Groups	Club	Head coach	City	Stadium	Capacity	2015 season
North	Beijing BIT ^{R}	(Spain) Robert Ahufinger	Beijing	BIT Eastern Athletic Field	5,000	CL1, 15th
North	Hebei Elite	(China) Xu Tao	Qinhuangdao	Chinese Football School Stadium	N/A	North, 3rd
North	Tianjin Huochetou	(China) Su Wei	Tianjin	Tianjin Huochetou Stadium	12,000	North, 4th
North	Baoding Yingli ETS	(China) Zhao Changhong	Baoding	Baoding People's Stadium	13,000	North, 5th
North	Baotou Nanjiao	(France) David Camhi	Baotou	Baotou Olympic Sports Centre Stadium	40,545	North, 6th
North	Yinchuan Helanshan	(Japan) Kazuo Uchida	Yinchuan	Helan Mountain Stadium	39,872	North, 7th
North	Shenyang Dongjin	(South Korea) Lee Woo-hyung	Shenyang	Shenyang Urban Construction University Stadium	12,000	North, 8th
North	Heilongjiang Lava Spring	(Bulgaria) Zoran Janković	Harbin	Harbin ICE Sports Center	50,000	South, 5th
North	Jiangsu Yancheng Dingli	(China) Gao Fei	Yancheng	Dafeng Olympic Sports Centre	10,000	South, 8th
North	Shenyang Urban ^{P}	(Poland) Marek Zub	Shenyang	Shenyang Urban Construction University Stadium	12,000	CAL, 4th
South	Jiangxi Liansheng ^{R}	(China) Song Lihui	Jiujiang	Jiujiang Stadium	31,000	CL1, 16th
South	Sichuan Longfor	(Portugal) Vítor Pontes	Santai	Santai County Stadium	8,000	South, 2nd
South	Meizhou Meixian Hakka	(China) Wang Hongwei	Meizhou	Meixian Tsang Hin-chi Stadium	20,221	South, 3rd
South	Lijiang Jiayunhao	(China) Zhang Biao	Lijiang	Lijiang Sports Development Centre Stadium	20,000	South, 4th
South	Shanghai JuJu Sports	(Serbia) Radomir Koković	Shanghai	Shanghai University Sports Center Stadium	3,430	South, 6th
South	Nantong Zhiyun	(China) Wei Xin	Rugao	Rugao Olympic Sports Center	15,000	South, 7th
South	Chengdu Qbao	(China) Zhao Faqing	Chengdu (playing in Dujiangyan)	Dujiangyan Phoenix Stadium	12,700	North, 2nd
South	Suzhou Dongwu ^{P}	(China) Tang Bo	Suzhou	Suzhou Sports Center	35,000	CAL, 1st
South	Hainan Boying & Seamen ^{P}	(China) Li Xiao	Haikou	Hainan Sport School Stadium	10,000	CAL, 2nd
South	Shenzhen Renren ^{P}	(China) Li Yuanping (caretaker)	Shenzhen	Bao'an Stadium	40,000	CAL, 3rd

=== Clubs Locations ===
Location of teams in 2016 China League Two

=== Managerial changes ===
Club	Outgoing manager	Date of vacancy	Incoming manager	Date of appointment
Yinchuan Helanshan	(China) Zhu Bo	22 December 2015	(Japan) Kazuo Uchida	22 December 2015
Hebei Elite	(Spain) Juan Carlos Añón	31 December 2015	(China) Xu Tao	1 January 2016
Baoding Yingli ETS	(China) Fan Yuhong	31 December 2015	(China) Zhao Changhong	9 January 2016
Shenzhen Renren	(China) Zhang Jun	31 December 2015	(Cyprus) Siniša Gogić	12 January 2016
Nantong Zhiyun	(China) Huang Yong	31 December 2015	(China) Wei Xin	14 January 2016
Shanghai JuJu Sports	(China) Zhang Biao	31 December 2015	(Serbia) Radomir Koković	15 January 2016
Baotou Nanjiao	(China) Xu Hui	31 December 2015	(France) David Camhi	18 January 2016
Jiangsu Yancheng Dingli	(China) Wei Xin	31 December 2015	(China) Gao Fei	22 January 2016
Heilongjiang Lava Spring	(Serbia) Darko Nović	31 December 2015	(Bulgaria) Zoran Janković	23 January 2016
Shenyang Urban	(China) Li Zheng	31 December 2015	(Poland) Marek Zub	24 January 2016
Shenyang Dongjin	(China) Li Wei	31 December 2015	(South Korea) Lee Woo-hyung	28 January 2016
Jiangxi Liansheng	(China) Sun Wei	31 December 2015	(China) Song Lihui	31 January 2016
Sichuan Longfor	(China) Jia Jin	15 January 2016	(China) Zhang Weizhe	17 February 2016
Sichuan Longfor	(China) Zhang Weizhe	7 May 2016	(Portugal) Vítor Pontes	7 May 2016
Shenzhen Renren	(Cyprus) Siniša Gogić	26 June 2016	(China) Li Yuanping (caretaker)	26 June 2016
Lijiang Jiayunhao	(China) Wang Zheng	6 July 2016	(China) Zhang Biao	6 July 2016
Beijing BIT ^{R}	(China) Yuan Wei	July 2016	(Spain) Robert Ahufinger	July 2016

== League table ==
=== North Group ===
Pos	Team	Pld	W	D	L	GF	GA	GD	Pts	Qualification or Qualifying
1	Yinchuan Helanshan (Q)	18	12	5	1	30	10	+20	41	Qualification to Play-offs
2	Hebei Elite (Q)	18	11	5	2	32	15	+17	38	Qualification to Play-offs
3	Shenyang Urban (Q)	18	10	3	5	28	15	+13	33	Qualification to Play-offs
4	Baoding Yingli ETS (Q, P)	18	9	5	4	28	16	+12	32	Qualification to Play-offs
5	Heilongjiang Lava Spring	18	9	3	6	25	20	+5	30	Qualifying to Play-offs
6	Baotou Nanjiao	18	5	4	9	22	29	−7	19	Qualifying to Play-offs
7	Tianjin Huochetou	18	4	4	10	16	24	−8	16	Qualifying to Play-offs
8	Beijing BIT	18	3	7	8	16	28	−12	16	Qualifying to Play-offs
9	Jiangsu Yancheng Dingli	18	2	7	9	13	26	−13	13	Qualifying to Play-offs
10	Shenyang Dongjin	18	1	5	12	14	41	−27	8	Qualifying to Play-offs

Updated to match(es) played on Aug 27, 2016. Source: fa.org.cn
Rules for classification: 1) Points; 2) Head-to-head points; 3) Head-to-head goal difference; 4) Head-to-head goals scored; 5) Goal difference; 6) Goals scored; 7) Disciplinary points (1 point for each yellow card, 3 points for each red card)
(P) Promoted; (Q) Qualified for the phase indicated

=== South Group ===
Pos	Team	Pld	W	D	L	GF	GA	GD	Pts	Qualification or Qualifying
1	Meizhou Meixian Hakka (Q)	18	8	10	0	25	14	+11	34	Qualification to Play-offs
2	Lijiang Jiayunhao (Q, C, P)	18	10	4	4	26	18	+8	34	Qualification to Play-offs
3	Jiangxi Liansheng (Q)	18	7	10	1	22	14	+8	31	Qualification to Play-offs
4	Sichuan Longfor (Q)	18	7	8	3	21	14	+7	29	Qualification to Play-offs
5	Chengdu Qbao	18	7	5	6	20	16	+4	26	Qualifying to Play-offs
6	Shenzhen Renren	18	5	5	8	14	15	−1	20	Qualifying to Play-offs
7	Suzhou Dongwu	18	4	6	8	10	14	−4	18	Qualifying to Play-offs
8	Nantong Zhiyun	18	3	9	6	13	19	−6	18	Qualifying to Play-offs
9	Hainan Boying & Seamen	18	4	5	9	12	22	−10	17	Qualifying to Play-offs
10	Shanghai JuJu Sports	18	2	4	12	15	32	−17	10	Qualifying to Play-offs

Updated to match(es) played on Aug 27, 2016. Source: fa.org.cn
Rules for classification: 1) Points; 2) Head-to-head points; 3) Head-to-head goal difference; 4) Head-to-head goals scored; 5) Goal difference; 6) Goals scored; 7) Disciplinary points (1 point for each yellow card, 3 points for each red card)
(C) Champions; (P) Promoted; (Q) Qualified for the phase indicated

=== Overall table ===
Pos	Team	Pld	W	D	L	GF	GA	GD	Pts	Promotion or relegation
1	Lijiang Jiayunhao (C, P)	23	13	5	5	32	21	+11	44 (Note: Lijiang 2:0 Baoding)	League One
2	Baoding Yingli ETS (P)	23	11	6	6	34	22	+12	39	League One
3	Jiangxi Liansheng	23	10	11	2	31	20	+11	41 (Note: Jiangxi 3:2 Sichuan)	
4	Sichuan Longfor	23	9	9	5	27	20	+7	36	
5	Yinchuan Helanshan	20	12	6	2	32	13	+19	42 (Note: Yinchuan, 1pts, GD=-1; Elite, 1pts, GD=-2, Pts=38; Meixian, 1pts, GD=-2, Pts=34; Urban, 0pts)	
6	Hebei Elite	20	11	6	3	33	18	+15	39	
7	Meizhou Meixian Hakka	20	8	11	1	26	17	+9	35	
8	Shenyang Urban	20	10	3	7	30	19	+11	33	
9	Chengdu Qbao	20	8	6	6	24	19	+5	30 (Note: Chengdu 2:2 Heilongjiang; Heilongjiang 1:2 Chengdu)	
10	Heilongjiang Lava Spring	20	9	4	7	28	24	+4	31	
11	Shenzhen Renren	20	7	5	8	21	16	+5	26 (Note: Baotou 0:1 Renren; Renren 6:1 Baotou)	
12	Baotou Nanjiao	20	5	4	11	23	36	−13	19	
13	Tianjin Huochetou	20	5	5	10	22	26	−4	20 (Note: Dongwu 1:1 Huochetou; Huochetou 5:1 Dongwu)	Disbanded after season
14	Suzhou Dongwu	20	4	7	9	12	20	−8	19 (Note: TJL)	
15	Beijing BIT	20	5	7	8	19	29	−10	22 (Note: BIT 2:1 Nantong; Nantong 0:1 BIT)	
16	Nantong Zhiyun	20	3	9	8	14	22	−8	18	
17	Hainan Boying & Seamen	20	6	5	9	20	25	−5	23 (Note: Yancheng 3:5 Hainan; Hainan 3:0 Yancheng)	
18	Jiangsu Yancheng Dingli	20	2	7	11	16	34	−18	13	
19	Shenyang Dongjin	20	2	5	13	18	43	−25	11 (Note: JuJu Sports 2:1 Dongjin; Dongjin 3:0 JuJu Sports)	
20	Shanghai JuJu Sports	20	3	4	13	17	36	−19	13	

(C) Champions; (P) Promoted

== Group stage results ==
=== North Group ===
Home \ Away	BDY	BTN	BIT	HBE	HLJ	JSY	SYU	SYD	TJH	YCH
Baoding Yingli ETS		1–2	2–2	2–1	0–2	2–0	0–0	2–0	2–0	1–1
Baotou Nanjiao	2–1		3–0	2–2	0–1	1–1	1–4	3–0	1–2	0–2
Beijing BIT	0–3	1–0		1–2	0–0	0–0	1–0	1–1	3–2	1–1
Hebei Elite	1–2	3–1	2–1		3–0	1–1	2–0	4–1	1–0	1–1
Heilongjiang Lava Spring	1–1	4–0	1–0	0–2		1–0	1–3	3–1	3–0	0–1
Jiangsu Yancheng Dingli	1–1	3–0	2–2	0–2	1–3		0–3	1–1	0–2	0–0
Shenyang Urban	0–2	1–1	3–0	0–1	1–1	4–2		2–0	1–0	1–0
Shenyang Dongjin	1–4	2–5	1–1	0–1	2–1	0–1	0–3		2–2	0–1
Tianjin Huochetou	0–1	0–0	3–1	2–2	1–2	1–0	0–1	1–1		0–2
Yinchuan Helanshan	2–1	1–0	2–1	1–1	4–1	2–0	3–1	5–1	1–0	

Updated to match(es) played on Aug 27, 2016. Source: fa.org.cn
Legend: Blue = home team win; Yellow = draw; Red = away team win.

=== South Group ===
Home \ Away	CDQ	HNS	JXL	LJJ	MXH	NTZ	SHJ	SZR	SCL	SZD
Chengdu Qbao		2–0	1–3	3–1	1–2	1–1	0–1	0–0	2–1	2–0
Hainan Boying & Seamen	2–1		1–1	0–1	0–2	0–1	4–1	0–1	1–3	1–0
Jiangxi Liansheng	0–0	0–0		0–0	1–1	2–0	1–3	3–1	1–0	1–1
Lijiang Jiayunhao	2–1	3–1	2–2		1–1	1–0	4–3	3–2	2–1	2–0
Meizhou Meixian Hakka	2–1	2–0	1–1	1–1		2–2	3–1	1–0	1–1	2–1
Nantong Zhiyun	1–1	0–1	1–1	0–2	0–0		1–0	0–0	0–0	0–0
Shanghai JuJu Sports	0–2	1–1	1–2	0–1	1–1	1–1		0–2	1–1	0–1
Shenzhen Renren	0–1	0–0	0–1	1–0	0–0	2–3	3–1		0–1	2–0
Sichuan Longfor	0–0	3–0	1–1	1–0	2–2	3–2	1–0	1–0		1–1
Suzhou Dongwu	0–1	0–0	0–1	1–0	0–1	2–0	3–0	0–0	0–0	

Updated to match(es) played on Aug 27, 2016. Source: fa.org.cn
Legend: Blue = home team win; Yellow = draw; Red = away team win.

== Play-offs ==
=== Nineteenth place match ===
Team 1	Agg.	Team 2	1st leg	2nd leg
Shanghai JuJu Sports	2–4	Shenyang Dongjin	2–1	0–3

==== First leg ====
10 September 2016
15:00

Shanghai JuJu Sports	2–1	Shenyang Dongjin
Shen Longyuan 60'; Lai Yanglong 89'	Report	Wen Tianpeng 67'

Shanghai University Sports Center Stadium, Shanghai
Referee: Wang Hao

==== Second leg ====
17 September 2016
15:00

Shenyang Dongjin	3–0	Shanghai JuJu Sports
Zhao Yuhan 37'; Guo Zihao 41', 84'

Shenyang Urban Construction University Stadium, Shenyang
Referee: Guan Changliang

=== Seventeenth Place Match ===
Team 1	Agg.	Team 2	1st leg	2nd leg
Jiangsu Yancheng Dingli	3–8	Hainan Boying & Seamen	3–5	0–3

==== First leg ====
10 September 2016
15:00

Jiangsu Yancheng Dingli	3–5	Hainan Boying & Seamen
Yang Wanshun 40'; Yang Deliang 45'; Fang Wensheng 65'	Report	Pan Chaoran 3'; Zhang Kaiming 12'; Wu Chen 22'; Li Xincheng 37'; Wang Qi 53'

Dafeng Olympic Sports Centre, Yancheng
Referee: Cui Yong

==== Second leg ====
17 September 2016
15:00

Hainan Boying & Seamen	3–0	Jiangsu Yancheng Dingli
Wu Chen 40', 78', 88'

Hainan Sport School Stadium, Haikou
Referee: Liang Songshang

=== Fifteenth Place Match ===
Team 1	Agg.	Team 2	1st leg	2nd leg
Beijing BIT	3–1	Nantong Zhiyun	2–1	1–0

==== First leg ====
10 September 2016
15:00

Beijing BIT	2–1	Nantong Zhiyun
Meng Yang 56'; Cui Wei 90'	Report	Qian Changjie 73'

BIT Eastern Athletic Field, Beijing
Referee: Zhang Yue

==== Second leg ====
15 September 2016
15:00

Nantong Zhiyun	0–1	Beijing BIT
		Chen Zixuan 48'

Rudong Olympic Sports Center, Nantong
Referee: Dai Yige

=== Thirteenth Place Match ===
Team 1	Agg.	Team 2	1st leg	2nd leg
Suzhou Dongwu	2–6	Tianjin Huochetou	1–1	1–5

==== First leg ====
10 September 2016
15:00

Suzhou Dongwu	1–1	Tianjin Huochetou
Wang Feng 41'	Report	Wang Guanyi 90'

Kunshan Stadium, Kunshan
Referee: Sun Chen

==== Second leg ====
17 September 2016
15:00

Tianjin Huochetou	5–1	Suzhou Dongwu
Wu Yuheng 32'; Li Zhi 45'; Ma Hongwei 51'; Hu Mingtian 67'; Wang Erzhuo 69'		Yu Zengpin 61'

Tianjin Locomotive Stadium, Tianjin
Referee: Zhang Haijun

=== Eleventh Place Match ===
Team 1	Agg.	Team 2	1st leg	2nd leg
Baotou Nanjiao	1–7	Shenzhen Renren	0–1	1–6

==== First leg ====
10 September 2016
15:45

Baotou Nanjiao	0–1	Shenzhen Renren
	Report	Cao Tianbao 77'

Baotou Olympic Sports Centre Stadium, Baotou
Referee: Wang Yang

==== Second leg ====
17 September 2016
15:00

Shenzhen Renren	6–1	Baotou Nanjiao
Cao Tianbao 20', 45'; Yang Bin 64'; Ma Xiaolei 66', 74', 82'		Wang Xiao 58'

Bao'an Stadium, Shenzhen
Referee: Xu Qiangqiang

=== Ninth Place Match ===
Team 1	Agg.	Team 2	1st leg	2nd leg
Chengdu Qbao	4–3	Heilongjiang Lava Spring	2–2	2–1

==== First leg ====
10 September 2016
15:00

Chengdu Qbao	2–2	Heilongjiang Lava Spring
Huang Chao 53'; Wang Qiang 70'	Report	Huang Gengji 57'; Wang Yunlong 73'

Dujiangyan Phoenix Stadium, Chengdu
Referee: He Kai

==== Second leg ====
17 September 2016
15:00

Heilongjiang Lava Spring	1–2	Chengdu Qbao
Wang Yunlong 46'		Gan Rui 52'; Xia Jin 69'

Harbin ICE Sports Center, Harbin
Referee: Sun Lei

=== Quarter-finals ===
Team 1	Agg.	Team 2	1st leg	2nd leg
Sichuan Longfor	3–2	Yinchuan Helanshan	2–1	1–1
Shenyang Urban	2–4	Lijiang Jiayunhao	0–1	2–3
Baoding Yingli ETS	3–1	Meizhou Meixian Hakka	1–1	2–0
Jiangxi Liansheng	3–1	Hebei Elite	2–0	1–1

==== First leg ====
10 September 2016
15:00

Sichuan Longfor	2–1	Yinchuan Helanshan
Chen Shaoqin 38'; Jiang Xiaochen 51'	Report	Wang Guanyu 55'

Santai County Stadium, Santai
Referee: Zhen Wei

10 September 2016
15:00

Shenyang Urban	0–1	Lijiang Jiayunhao
	Report	Yang Zi 59'

Shenyang Urban Construction University Stadium, Shenyang
Referee: Niu Minghui

10 September 2016
15:00

Baoding Yingli ETS	1–1	Meizhou Meixian Hakka
Liu Xiaodong 4'	Report	Pan Jia 75'

Baoding People's Stadium, Baoding
Referee: Yu Bo

10 September 2016
19:30

Jiangxi Liansheng	2–0	Hebei Elite
Huang Jiaqiang 50'; Fan Zhiqiang 63'	Report

Jiujiang Stadium, Jiujiang
Referee: Tang Shunqi

==== Second leg ====
17 September 2016
15:00

Yinchuan Helanshan	1–1	Sichuan Longfor
Yang Changpeng 90+2'		Hu Jun 27' (o.g.)

Helan Mountain Stadium, Yinchuan
Referee: Shen Yinhao

Sichuan Longfor won 3–2 on aggregate.

17 September 2016
15:00

Lijiang Jiayunhao	3–2	Shenyang Urban
Yang Zi 9', 35'; Wen Shuo 54'		Wu Dingmao 11'; Duan Yunzi 22'

Lijiang Sports Development Center, Lijiang
Referee: Xia Jun

Lijiang Jiayunhao won 4–2 on aggregate.

17 September 2016
15:00

Meizhou Meixian Hakka	0–2	Baoding Yingli ETS
		Zhang Shuang 2', 90+2'

Meixian Tsang Hin-chi Stadium, Meizhou
Referee: Zhang Long

Baoding Yingli ETS won 3–1 on aggregate.

17 September 2016
15:00

Hebei Elite	1–1	Jiangxi Liansheng
Shi Jun 48'		Xu Bo 50'

Chinese Football School Stadium, Qinhuangdao
Referee: Liu Lin

Jiangxi Liansheng won 3–1 on aggregate.

=== Semi-finals ===
Team 1	Agg.	Team 2	1st leg	2nd leg
Lijiang Jiayunhao	1–1 (2–1 p)	Sichuan Longfor	0–1	1–0 (a.e.t.)
Jiangxi Liansheng	3–3 (a)	Baoding Yingli ETS	3–1	0–2

==== First leg ====
8 October 2016
15:00

Lijiang Jiayunhao	0–1	Sichuan Longfor
		Jiang Xiaochen 54'

Lijiang Sports Development Center, Lijiang
Referee: Wang Jing

8 October 2016
19:35

Jiangxi Liansheng	3–1	Baoding Yingli ETS
Fan Zhiqiang 45+2'; Zhang Zhichao 66'; Xu Chen 87'		Du Junpeng 72'

Jiujiang Stadium, Jiujiang
Referee: Chen Gang

==== Second leg ====
15 October 2016
15:00

Sichuan Longfor	0–1	Lijiang Jiayunhao
		Gao Furong 63'
Penalties
Lu Cheng (penalty missed); Qu Cheng (penalty missed); Chen Tao (penalty scored); Gan Yingbo (penalty missed); Chen Shaoqin (penalty missed)	1 – 2	Chen Fangzhou (penalty scored); Wen Shuo (penalty scored); Gao Furong (penalty missed); Sun Fei (penalty missed)

Chengdu Sports Centre, Chengdu
Referee: Ai Kun

1–1 on aggregate. Lijiang Jiayunhao won 2–1 on penalties.

15 October 2016
15:00

Baoding Yingli ETS	2–0	Jiangxi Liansheng
Yang Hao 78'; Liu Xiaodong 90+2'

Baoding People's Stadium, Baoding
Referee: Hei Xiaohu

3–3 on aggregate. Baoding Yingli ETS won on away goals.

=== Third-Place Match ===
22 October 2016
15:00

Jiangxi Liansheng	3–2	Sichuan Longfor
Zhu Yifan 34', 87'; Fan Zhiqiang 56'		Zhu Chaoqing 20'; Liu Yaoxin 72'

Jiujiang Stadium, Jiujiang
Referee: Gu Chunhan

=== Final Match ===
23 October 2016
15:00

Lijiang Jiayunhao	2–0	Baoding Yingli ETS
Yang Zi 14'; Men Yang 87'

Lijiang Sports Development Center, Lijiang
Referee: Lin Jun

== Top scorers ==
Rank	Player	Club	Total
1	(China) Zhang Shuang	Baoding Yingli ETS	14
2	(China) Tan Tiancheng	Yinchuan Helanshan	11
3	(China) Han Zilong	Hebei Elite	9
3	(China) Yang Jian	Shenyang Urban	9
3	(China) Yan Peng	Shenyang Urban	9
6	(China) Fan Zhiqiang	Jiangxi Liansheng	8
6	(China) Yang Zi	Lijiang Jiayunhao	8
6	(China) Zhu Yifan	Jiangxi Liansheng	8
9	(China) Liu Yang	Meizhou Meixian Hakka	7
9	(China) Shi Jun	Hebei Elite	7
9	(China) Wang Ziming	Heilongjiang Lava Spring	7
9	(China) Yang Wanshun	Jiangsu Yancheng Dingli	7

Last updated: 23 October 2016
Source: fa.org.cn

== Awards ==
The awards of 2016 China League Two were announced on 11 November 2016.

- Most valuable player: (China) Zhang Shuang (Baoding Yingli ETS)
- Golden Boot: (China) Zhang Shuang (Baoding Yingli ETS)
- Best goalkeeper: (China) Wen Zhixiang (Jiangxi Liansheng)
- Young Player of the Year: (China) Zhang Xingbo (Meizhou Meixian Hakka)
- Best coach: (China) Zhang Biao (Lijiang Jiayunhao)
- Fair play award: Yinchuan Helanshan, Meizhou Meixian Hakka, Shenzhen Renren, Shanghai JuJu Sports, Shenyang Urban
- Best referee: (China) Yang Delin, (China) Dai Yige, (China) Zhang Meilin

== Attendance ==
Club	Total	Average	Change
Lijiang Jiayunhao	88,268	7,356	8.4%
Heilongjiang Lava Spring	85,981	8,598	253.2%
Sichuan Longfor	66,093	6,008	57.2%
Jiangxi Liansheng	63,196	5,266	-1.5%^{†}
Meizhou Meixian Hakka	52,188	5,219	-21.2%
Nantong Zhiyun	48,252	4,825	200.3%
Shenyang Urban	32,386	3,239	n/a^{‡}
Yinchuan Helanshan	32,080	3,208	28.5%
Shenzhen Renren	25,541	2,554	n/a^{‡}
Baoding Yingli ETS	22,099	2,009	-16.2%
Baotou Nanjiao	17,079	1,708	-71.9%
Hainan Boying & Seamen	14,564	1,456	n/a^{‡}
Chengdu Qbao	14,422	1,442	-6.5%
Beijing BIT	7,483	748	-57.2%^{†}
Jiangsu Yancheng Dingli	7,310	731	24.7%
Suzhou Dongwu	7,279	728	n/a^{‡}
Shenyang Dongjin	5,874	587	173.2%
Shanghai JuJu Sports	4,230	423	-40.4%
Hebei Elite	4,227	423	52.6%
Tianjin Huochetou	2,015	202	-2.2%
Total	600,567	2,915	13.1%

Note:
† Teams played previous season in CL1.
‡ Teams played previous season in CAL.
Source: 同道DATA, 同道DATA
