= MFA Taipei =

Taiwanese football club

- Full name: Master Football Academy Taiwan Senior Team
- Short name: MFA
- Founded: 2026
- Ground: Volkswagen Football Park
- Head coach: David Camhi
- League: Taiwan Football League 2
- Website: https://www.mfa.com.tw/
Home colours	Away colours

MFA Taipei is a football team based in Taipei, Taiwan which currently competes in the Taiwan Football League 2. It is the senior team of the Master Football Academy Taiwan.

== History ==
Master Football Academy Taiwan was founded in 2004 by Daniel Calvert and Michael Chandler. The senior team participated in the 2026–27 Taiwan Football League 2 qualifiers under the name MFA Taipei and qualified by defeating Taichung Futuro Reserves.

== Kit manufacturers and shirt sponsors ==
Period	Kit manufacturer	Main shirt sponsor (chest)
2026–present	Puma	Volkswagen

== Current squad ==
As of 25 September 2026

Note: Flags indicate national team as defined under FIFA eligibility rules; some limited exceptions apply. Players may hold more than one non-FIFA nationality.

No.	Pos.	Nation	Player
1	GK	PAR	Arnold Almada
2	FW	TPE	Hsieh Ping-hung
4	DF	ESA	Diego Loza (captain)
5	DF	TPE	Kuan Huai
6	MF	TPE	Miguel Gamarra
7	DF	TPE	Chang Wei-kai
8	DF	PAR	Alessandro Espillaga
9	FW	TPE	Huang Kai-chun
10	MF	TPE	Chen Yu-hsun
11	FW	TPE	Chen Ming-che
12	DF	TPE	Tien Min
15	FW	TPE	Lu Tsung-yen
17	FW	TPE	Chen Yi-fu
19	MF	TPE	Lee Wei-lun
22	FW	TPE	Tsai Ta-chuan
23	GK	TPE	Wang Pin-hao
24	DF	TPE	Chang Yu-cheng

No.	Pos.	Nation	Player
25	DF	TPE	Charles Guyot
27	DF	GUA	Gerardo Rabre
30	MF	TPE	Thiều Hà Phúc Hoàng
31	DF	TPE	Chang Cheng-yu
32	DF	TPE	Huang Chun-chi
33	MF	TPE	Huang Pin-sheng
37	MF	TPE	Fu Ting-hung
41	GK	TPE	Hung Tzu-hao
47	FW	TPE	Wang Ching-hao
49	MF	JPN	Tsubasa Tanaka
51	GK	TPE	Chen Sheng-han
63	FW	TPE	Chiang Hsin-yu
64	MF	BUL	Nolen Assenov
77	FW	TPE	Yang Chih-hsueh
80	MF	TPE	Shiryu Tang
98	MF	ITA	Christian Borean
99	FW	GUA	Jose Gallardo

== Coaching staff ==
Position	Staff
Head coach	(France) David Camhi
Assistant coach	(Italy) Thomas Costa
Assistant coach	(Honduras) Elias Argueta
Goalkeeping coach	(France) Cedric Guyot
