= Taichung City FC =

- Full name: Taichung City Football Club
- Short name: TCFC
- Founded: 2021; 5 years ago
- Head coach: Michael Adamson
- League: Taiwan Football League 2
- Website: https://tcfc29.com/
Home colours	Away colours

Taichung City Football Club (Chinese: 台中市足球俱樂部) is a football club based in Taichung, Taiwan which currently competes in the Taiwan Football League 2.

== History ==
Taichung City Football Club was founded in 2021 by a group of footballer lovers, mostly foreign expatriates living in Taiwan. In 2026, they participated in the 2026–27 League 2 qualifiers. They qualified by defeating Taichung Futuro Reserves in their second match despite losing the first against National University of Kaohsiung.

== Kit manufacturers and shirt sponsors ==
Period	Kit manufacturer	Main shirt sponsor (chest)
2021–2023	Voar	Yours Dental (home) KE@HOME (away)
2023–2026	Afei	Köln Platinum Dental Clinic (home) FCU Sports Center (away)
2026–present	Afei	Sinceresthetic Dental Clinic

== Current squad ==
As of 24 September 2026

Note: Flags indicate national team as defined under FIFA eligibility rules; some limited exceptions apply. Players may hold more than one non-FIFA nationality.

No.	Pos.	Nation	Player
1	GK	TPE	Kung Po-kai
2	DF	TPE	Yu Yu-chieh
3	FW	SWZ	Mgcini Shabangu
4	DF	SWZ	Thabiso Dlamini (captain)
5	DF	ENG	Paul Woodall
6	MF	SCO	Steven Laird
7	MF	TPE	Huang Wei-lun
8	MF	TPE	Chang Chun-chieh
9	FW	NED	Quincy Baal
10	MF	TPE	Wan Hsien-yi
11	MF	TPE	Wu Ping-hsuan
12	FW	TPE	Yeh Hsuan-fu
13	MF	JPN	Hayato Yamada
14	FW	BFA	Check Barro

No.	Pos.	Nation	Player
15	DF	TPE	Wei Feng-nan
16	DF	TPE	Chen Yuan-chun
17	MF	SWZ	Phinda Dlamini
19	DF	TPE	Wu Yueh-tse
20	MF	TPE	Wei Li-meng
21	MF	TPE	Lin Cheng-hsin
29	DF	FRA	Antoine Chapelet Letourneux
30	MF	SWZ	Sifiso Matse
32	DF	SGP	Justin Nirmalan
43	DF	TPE	Peng Chuan-min (on loan from Taichung Futuro Reserves)
55	DF	TPE	Lin Ting-wei (on loan from Taichung Futuro Reserves)
88	DF	TPE	Akito Ishibashi
99	MF	MAS	Tan Chun Lai

== Coaching staff ==
Position	Staff
Head coach	(New Zealand) Michael Adamson
Assistant coach	(France) Raphael Blanchon
