= Tianjin Huochetou F.C. =

Chinese football club

Tianjin Huochetou Tiānjīn Huǒchētóu 天津火车头
- Full name: Tianjin Huochetou Football Club 天津火车头足球俱乐部
- Founded: 1950; 76 years ago 1994; 32 years ago (professional)
- Dissolved: 2016; 10 years ago
- Ground: Tianjin Huochetou Stadium, Tianjin
- Capacity: 12,000
Home colours	Away colours

Tianjin Huochetou Football Club (simplified Chinese: 天津火车头; traditional Chinese: 天津火車頭; pinyin: Tiānjīn Huǒchētóu) was a professional Chinese former football club that last participated in China League Two. The team was based in Tianjin and their home stadium was the Tianjin Huochetou Stadium, which has a seating capacity of 12,000. Their last major investors were the China Railway Corporation.

The club was originally established in 1950 by the Ministry of Railways of the People's Republic of China and were one of the founding members of the 1951 Chinese league championship. In 1994 the club was reorganized to become a completely professional football unit. At the end of the 2016 China League Two season, the club disbanded.

== Results ==
All-time League rankings

- As of the end of 2016 season.

Year	Div	Pld	W	D	L	GF	GA	GD	Pts	Pos.	FA Cup	Super Cup	AFC	Att./G	Stadium
1951	1	7	2	1	4	15	9	+6	5	6	–	–	–		
1953	1	4	1	1	2	10	6	+4	3^{1}	4	–	–	–		
1954	1	4	1	1	2	8	5	+3	3	4	–	–	–		
1955	1	10	6	3	1	22	8	+14	15^{1}	3	–	–	–		
1956	1	6	1	2	3	5	9	−4	7^{1}	9	DNE	–	–		
1957	1	20	5	5	10	25	31	−6	35	9	NH	–	–		
1958	1	21	6	7	8	26	28	−2	40	6	NH	–	–		
1961	1	–	–	–	–	–	–	–	–	5	NH	–	–		
1962	1	19	5	9	5	16	16	0	7 ^{2}	9	NH	–	–		
1981	3	9	2	–	7				4^{2}	8	NH	–	–		
1982	3	8	3	–	5	5	11	−6	6^{2}	8	NH	–	–		
1984	2									9^{1}	DNQ	–	–		
1987	3									RU	NH	–	–		
1988	2									3	NH	–	–		
1989	3									RU	NH	–	–		
1990	2	22	8	6	8	24	22	+2	30	4	DNQ	–	–		
1991	2	18	7	9	2	21	14	+7	23^{1}	3	R1	–	–		
1992	2	10	3	4	3	12	13	−1	10	4^{1}	SF	–	–		
1993	2	5	2	1/1	1	3	2	+1	6	4^{1}	NH	–	–		
1994	2	20	6	8	6	19	19	0	20	6	NH	–	–		
1995	2	22	9	5	8	29	23	+6	32	6	DNQ	DNQ	–		
1996	2	22	5	7	10	15	23	−8	22	10	R1	DNQ	–		
1997	2	22	3	4	15	18	52	−34	13	12	R1	DNQ	–		
1998	3										DNQ	DNQ	–		
2004	3	20	6	8	6	29	36	−7	25^{1}	5	DNQ	NH	–		Tianjin Huochetou Stadium
2005	3	14	5	4	5	18	13	+5	19	5^{1}	DNQ	NH	–		Tianjin Huochetou Stadium
2006	3	21	8	10	3	29	17	+12	27	4	DNQ	NH	–		Tianjin Huochetou Stadium
2007	3	16	7	3	6	22	13	+9	23^{1}	9	NH	NH	–		Tianjin Huochetou Stadium
2008	3	20	10	2	8	32	19	+13	10	4	NH	NH	–		Tianjin Huochetou Stadium
2009	3	14	4	5	5	14	18	−4	16^{1}	8	NH	NH	–		Tianjin Huochetou Stadium
2010	3	18	6	2	10	15	20	−5	22^{1}	6	NH	NH	–		Minyuan Stadium
2012	3	23	4	5	14	10	26	−16	17	11^{1}	DNE	DNQ	–		Tianjin Huochetou Stadium
2013	3	14	3	6	5	7	11	−4	15	6^{1}	DNE	DNQ	–		Tianjin Huochetou Stadium
2014	3	14	2	2	10	7	22	−15	8	7^{1}	R2	DNQ	–		Tianjin Huochetou Stadium
2015	3	16	6	4	6	25	22	+3	22^{1}	8	R2	DNQ	–	206	Tianjin Huochetou Stadium
2016	3	20	5	5	10	22	26	−4	20	13	R1	DNQ	DNQ	202	Tianjin Huochetou Stadium

- No league games in 1959, 1966–72.
- Did not compete in 1963–65, 1973, 1983–86, 1999–2003 and 2011.
- ^1 In group stage *^2 In final group stage

Key

	China top division
	China second division
	China third division
W	Champions
RU	Runners-up
3	Third place
	Relegated

- Pld = Played
- W = Games won
- D = Games drawn
- L = Games lost
- F = Goals for
- A = Goals against
- Pts = Points
- Pos = Final position
- DNQ = Did not qualify
- DNE = Did not enter
- NH = Not Held
- - = Does Not Exist
- R1 = Round 1
- R2 = Round 2
- R3 = Round 3
- R4 = Round 4
- F = Final
- SF = Semi-finals
- QF = Quarter-finals
- R16 = Round of 16
- Group = Group stage
- GS2 = Second Group stage
- QR1 = First Qualifying Round
- QR2 = Second Qualifying Round
- QR3 = Third Qualifying Round
