= Baoding Yingli ETS F.C. =

Chinese football club

Baoding Yingli ETS 保定英利易通
- Full name: Baoding Yingli ETS Football Club
- Founded: 2008; 17 years ago (Amateur); 17 April 2015; 10 years ago (Professional)
- Dissolved: 23 May 2020; 5 years ago
- Ground: Hebei University Stadium, Baoding
- Capacity: 20,000
- 2019: League Two, 25th
Home colours	Away colours

Baoding Yingli ETS (Chinese: 保定英利易通) was a professional Chinese football club that last participated in the China League Two division under licence from the Chinese Football Association (CFA). The team was based in Baoding, Hebei. Their owner was the Baoding City Real Estate Group Co., Ltd.

== History ==
The club was originally formed as Hebei Yingli (河北英利) in 2008 as an affiliated team by the China Yingli group, where they took part as an amateur team in the Hebei Amateur Football League. With a team built using Yingli employees they were able to reach the China Amateur Football League finals where they came fourth in the 2010 championship. After this performance the Baoding City Real Estate Group Co., Ltd became interested in acquiring the club so they could register them in and gain participation in the China League Two division. This would come into fruition on April 21, 2015, when they officially took over the club, renamed them Baoding Yingli ETS F.C. and converted them into a professional team when they participated at the bottom of the professional Chinese football league within the 2015 China League Two season. In their debut season Fan Yuhong was brought in as the Head coach and the club would play within the Baoding Foreign Language School Stadium. After finishing fifth within their group stage and missing out on the play-offs Zhao Changhong was brought in as the new manager the following season, where with continued investment from Baoding City Real Estate Group along with a move to Baoding People's Stadium, he was able to guide the club to a runners-up spot at the end of the 2016 China League Two season and promotion to the China League One division for the first time. On 1 July 2017, Meng Yongli, chairman of the club, announced that the club would withdraw from the league after Baoding conceded a controversial penalty in the injury time against Wuhan Zall. Meng Yongli resigned on the following day, as the club proclaimed their stay in the league, and would be willing to accept punishment from the Chinese Football Association. They were relegated at the end of their first season in the League One.

On May 23, 2020, the club was deregistered.

== Name history ==
- 2008–2015: Hebei Yingli F.C. (河北英利)
- 2015–present: Baoding Yingli ETS F.C. (保定英利易通)

== Coaching staff ==
Position	Staff
Head coach	(China) Fan Yuhong
Assistant coach	(China) Liu Jinbiao
Goalkeeping coach	(Bulgaria) Tihomir Vasilev Todorov
Fitness coach	(China) Yang Dexin

Source: CFA

== Managerial history ==
- (China) Fan Yuhong (2015)
- (China) Zhao Changhong (2016–25 May 2017)
- (Netherlands) Jo Bonfrère (25 May 2017–9 Oct 2017)
- (China) Shang Qing (caretaker) (9 Oct 2017–16 Dec 2017)
- (China) Han Yalin (10 Feb 2018–25 Jan 2019)
- (China) Fan Yuhong (25 Jan 2019–31 Dec 2019)

== Results ==
All-time league rankings

As of the end of 2019 season.

Year	Div	Pld	W	D	L	GF	GA	GD	Pts	Pos.	FA Cup	Super Cup	AFC	Att./G	Stadium
2014	4									5^{1}	DNQ	DNQ	DNQ		
2015	3	14	5	5	4	26	17	9	20	5^{1}	DNE	DNQ	DNQ	2,398	Baoding Foreign Language School Stadium
2016	3	23	11	6	6	34	22	12	39	RU	R2	DNQ	DNQ	2,009	Baoding People's Stadium
2017	2	30	8	7	15	41	51	-10	31	15	R2	DNQ	DNQ	6,153	Hebei University Stadium
2018	3	28	15	3	10	42	31	11	45	15	R3	DNQ	DNQ	3,454	Hebei University Stadium
2019	3	30	9	5	16	32	46	-6	26^{2}	25	R3	DNQ	DNQ		Hebei University Stadium

- ^1 in North Group.
- ^2 Baoding Yingli ETS was deducted six points for failing to implement ruling of CFA.

Key

	China top division
	China second division
	China third division
	China fourth division
W	Winners
RU	Runners-up
3	Third place
	Relegated

- Pld = Played
- W = Games won
- D = Games drawn
- L = Games lost
- F = Goals for
- A = Goals against
- Pts = Points
- Pos = Final position
- DNQ = Did not qualify
- DNE = Did not enter
- NH = Not Held
- – = Does Not Exist
- R1 = Round 1
- R2 = Round 2
- R3 = Round 3
- R4 = Round 4
- F = Final
- SF = Semi-finals
- QF = Quarter-finals
- R16 = Round of 16
- Group = Group stage
- GS2 = Second Group stage
- QR1 = First Qualifying Round
- QR2 = Second Qualifying Round
- QR3 = Third Qualifying Round
