= 2026–27 Taiwan Football League 2 =

Taiwan Football League 2
- Season: 2026–27
- Dates: 19 September 2026 – 1 May 2027
- Matches: 27
- Goals: 87 (3.22 per match)
- Top goalscorer: Park Jun-soo; Yuu Yamada (5 goals)
- Biggest home win: Taichung San Hai Tun NTUS 7–0 Babuza (18 October 2026)
- Biggest away win: Kaohsiung Attackers Reserves 0–5 Ming Chuan University (17 October 2026)
- Highest scoring: Taichung San Hai Tun NTUS 6–1 National University of Kaohsiung (19 September 2026); Taichung San Hai Tun NTUS 7–0 Babuza (18 October 2026)
- Longest winning run: Inter; Ming Chuan University; New Taipei Hang Yuan Rerserves (3 matches)
- Longest unbeaten run: Ming Chuan University (6 matches)
- Longest winless run: Babuza; Sunny Bank AC Taipei Reserves; Taichung City (5 matches)
- Longest losing run: Babuza (5 matches)
- All statistics correct as of 21 November 2026.

The 2026–27 Taiwan Football League 2 is the seventh season of Taiwan Football League 2. The league has expanded to 10 teams for this season. The season begins on 19 September 2026 and ends on 1 May 2027.

== Teams ==
=== Promotions and relegations ===
There are 10 teams in the league, including 3 teams from the 2025–26 season, 1 relegated team from the TFPL and 6 teams from the qualifiers.

==== Incoming teams ====
Ming Chuan University finished last place in the 2025–26 Taiwan Football Premier League and was relegated automatically. Babuza, Kaohsiung Attackers Reserves, MFA Taipei, National University of Kaohsiung, Taichung City and Taichung San Hai Tun NTUS qualified from the qualifiers.

==== Outgoing teams ====
Kaohsiung Attackers, the champions of the 2025–26 League 2 earned automatic promotion to the Taiwan Football Premier League. Taichung Rock B and Wan Island, finishing 4th and 7th in 2025–26 season didn't sign up for the 2026–27 season. Desafio Taipei, previously called MCU Desafio, had signed up but later withdrew before the season started after deciding to suspend their top team's operation.

Incoming teams	Outgoing teams
Babuza; Kaohsiung Attackers Reserves; MFA Taipei; Ming Chuan University; National University of Kaohsiung; Taichung City; Taichung San Hai Tun NTUS	MCU Desafio; Kaohsiung Attackers; Taichung Rock B Wan Island

=== Teams and locations ===
Team	Chinese	Based in	Seasons in League 2	First season in League 2
Babuza	半線蒼鷹	Changhua County	1	2026–27
Inter	國際	Taipei City	7	2020
Kaohsiung Attackers Reserves	高雄先鋒預備隊	Kaohsiung City	1	2026–27
MFA Taipei	台北MFA	Taipei City	1	2026–27
Ming Chuan University	銘傳大學	Taoyuan City	2	2021
National University of Kaohsiung	高大NUK	Kaohsiung City	3	2023
New Taipei Hang Yuan Reserves	新北航源預備隊	New Taipei City	2	2025–26
Sunny Bank AC Taipei Reserves	陽信北競預備隊	Taipei City	4	2023
Taichung City	台中市	Taichung City	1	2026–27
Taichung San Hai Tun NTUS	山海屯臺體	Taichung City	1	2026–27

=== Venues ===
Taiwan Football League 2 teams currently don't have their own home grounds. Each ground may hold 1 to 3 matches per matchday.

Location of venues in 2026–27 Taiwan Football League 2

Stadium	Chinese	Location	Capacity
Kaohsiung Nanzih Football Stadium	高雄市立楠梓足球場	Kaohsiung City	1,200
Ming Chuan University Taoyuan Campus	銘傳大學龜山校區	Taoyuan City	5,000
National University of Kaohsiung	國立高雄大學	Kaohsiung City	0
Taiyuan Football Field	太原足球場	Taichung City	600
Xitun Football Field	西屯足球場	Taichung City	200
Yingfeng Riverside Park	迎風河濱公園	Taipei City	100

=== Foreign players ===
- Players name in **bold** indicates the player was registered during the mid-season transfer window.

Club	Player 1	Player 2	Player 3	Player 4	Player 5	Player 6	Player 7	Player 8	Player 9	Player 10	Player 11	Player 12	Former player (s)
Babuza	(France) Nicolas Noyon												
Inter	(South Korea) Hwang Tae-gyu	(South Korea) Kim Dong-soo	(South Korea) Kim Jae-jung	(South Korea) Kim Yong-soo	(South Korea) Lee Ha-neul	(France) Zacchary Meftah	(South Korea) Park Jun-soo	(Japan) Genki Takatera					
Kaohsiung Attackers Reserves	(Japan) Yuu Yamada												
MFA Taipei	(Paraguay) Arnold Almada	(Bulgaria) Nolen Assenov	(Italy) Christian Borean	(Paraguay) Alessandro Espillaga	(Guatemala) Jose Gallardo	(El Salvador) Diego Loza	(Guatemala) Gerardo Rabre	(Japan) Tsubasa Tanaka					
Ming Chuan University													
National University of Kaohsiung													
New Taipei Hang Yuan Reserves													
Sunny Bank AC Taipei Reserves	(Japan) Taiki Kita												
Taichung City	(Netherlands) Quincy Baal	(Burkina Faso) Check Barro	(France) Antoine Chapelet Letourneux	(Eswatini) Phinda Dlamini	(Eswatini) Thabiso Dlamini	(Scotland) Steven Laird	(Eswatini) Sifiso Matse	(Singapore) Justin Nirmalan	(Eswatini) Mgcini Shabangu	(Malaysia) Tan Chun Lai	(England) Paul Woodall	(Japan) Hayato Yamada	
Taichung San Hai Tun NTUS													

=== Personnel and sponsorship ===
Team	Manager	Captain	Kit manufacturer	Main kit sponsor
Babuza	(Taiwan) Hou Fang-wei	(Chinese Taipei) Li Chung-yun	(Spain) Joma	Changhua County Government
Inter	(Taiwan) Lin Hsin-yu	(Chinese Taipei) Chang Ting-an	(Italy) Kappa	Yuan Chen Yao International Travel Agency
Kaohsiung Attackers Reserves	(Taiwan) Weng Wei-pin	(Chinese Taipei) Chen Yi-wei	(Japan) Athleta	Matrix Fitness
MFA Taipei	(France) David Camhi	(El Salvador) Diego Loza	(Germany) Puma	Volkswagen
Ming Chuan University	(Taiwan) Tseng Tai-lin	(Chinese Taipei) Li Po-yu	(Taiwan) Hetian	—N/a
National University of Kaohsiung	(Taiwan) Chen Chien-chih	(Chinese Taipei) Huang Shih-lun	(Taiwan) Kicker	National University of Kaohsiung
New Taipei Hang Yuan Reserves	(Taiwan) Lee Yi-sheng	(Chinese Taipei) Wang Hao-lin	(China) Ucan	—N/a
Sunny Bank AC Taipei Reserves	(Spain) Ángel Oliveira	(Chinese Taipei) Liao Mao-lin	(China) Ucan	Sunny Bank
Taichung City	(England) Michael Adamson	(Eswatini) Thabiso Dlamini	(Taiwan) Afei	Sinceresthetic Dental Clinic
Taichung San Hai Tun NTUS	(Taiwan) Huang Tzu-jung	(Chinese Taipei) Cheng Kai-yi	(Denmark) Hummel	Taichung San Hai Tun Sport Association

== League table ==
Pos	Team	Pld	W	D	L	GF	GA	GD	Pts	Qualification or relegation
1	Ming Chuan University	6	4	2	0	12	2	+10	14	Promotion to the Taiwan Football Premier League
2	Inter	5	4	1	0	14	6	+8	13	Promotion to the Taiwan Football Premier League
3	New Taipei Hang Yuan Reserves	5	3	1	1	9	5	+4	10	
4	Kaohsiung Attackers Reserves	6	2	2	2	6	10	−4	8	
5	Taichung San Hai Tun NTUS	5	2	2	1	17	6	+11	8	
6	National University of Kaohsiung	6	2	1	3	10	13	−3	7	
7	Sunny Bank AC Taipei Reserves	6	1	3	2	10	9	+1	6	
8	MFA Taipei	5	1	2	2	5	3	+2	5	
9	Taichung City	5	0	2	3	3	12	−9	2	
10	Babuza	5	0	0	5	1	21	−20	0	

Updated to match(es) played on 21 November 2026. Source:
Rules for classification: 1) Points; 2) Head-to-head points; 3) Head-to-head goal difference; 4) Head-to-head goals scored; 5) Overall goal difference; 6) Overall goals scored; 7) Fewer disciplinary points; 8) Draw lots

=== Position by round ===
Team ╲ Round	1	2	3	4	5	6	7	8	9	10	11	12	13	14	15	16	17	18
Babuza	9	10	10	10	10	10												
Inter	4	3	3	2	2	2												
Kaohsiung Attackers Reserves	5	6	5	7	7	4												
MFA Taipei	5	8	8	8	8	8												
Ming Chuan University	3	2	1	1	1	1												
National University of Kaohsiung	10	5	6	4	5	6												
New Taipei Hang Yuan Reserves	7	7	7	6	4	3												
Sunny Bank AC Taipei Reserves	2	4	4	5	6	7												
Taichung City	8	9	9	9	9	9												
Taichung San Hai Tun NTUS	1	1	2	3	3	5												

Updated to match(es) played on 21 November 2026. Source:
= Champions and promotion to the Taiwan Football Premier League; = Promotion to the Taiwan Football Premier League

== Results ==
=== Qualifiers ===
Babuza, Hsinchu Science City, Kaohsiung Attackers Reserves, MFA Taipei, National University of Kaohsiung, Pakarongay, Taichung City, Taichung Futuro Reserves and Taichung San Hai Tun NTUS were the teams that had signed up for the qualifiers. Pakarongay later withdrew from the qualifiers.

16 August 2026
13:30 (UTC+8)

Taichung San Hai Tun NTUS	1–2	Babuza
Chen Yi-hsuan 39'	Recap	Chang Chih-kai 50'; Hsu Kuei 74' (o.g.)

Xitun Football Field, Taichung
16 August 2026
13:30 (UTC+8)

Taichung City	0–3	National University of Kaohsiung
	Recap	Chen Yu-chun 7'; Tsai Fu-yu 45'; Tang Yi-ting 53'

National University of Kaohsiung, Kaohsiung
16 August 2026
16:00 (UTC+8)

Kaohsiung Attackers Reserves	3–0	Hsinchu Science City
Liu Ping-en 13'; Hu Sheng-wei 38'; Yamada 52'	Recap

National University of Kaohsiung, Kaohsiung
22 August 2026
16:00 (UTC+8)

Taichung Futuro Reserves	4–5 (a.e.t.)	MFA Taipei
Fang Ching-ren 13', 16'; Bartlett 30'; Chen Ke 59'	Recap	Gamarra 43'; Huang Kai-chun 48' (pen.), 79'; Gallardo 71'; Chen Yi-fu 120+1'

Xitun Football Field, Taichung
Attendance: 50

22 August 2026
16:00 (UTC+8)

Hsinchu Science City	0–1	Taichung San Hai Tun NTUS
	Recap	Ku Chieh-an 3'

Yingfeng Riverside Park, Taipei
29 August 2026
16:00 (UTC+8)

Taichung City	3–2	Taichung Futuro Reserves
Nirmalan 57'; Shabangu 86'; T. Dlamini 90+2'	Recap	Fang Ching-ren 69'; Cheng Yu-chi 79'

Xitun Football Field, Taichung

=== Regular season ===
Each team plays a total of 18 games, playing the other teams two times.

Home \ Away	BAB	INT	KHA	MFA	MCU	NUK	NTH	SAC	TXG	SHT
Babuza		20 Feb	12 Dec	0–4	17 Apr	1–4	13 Mar	0–4	5 Dec	31 Jan
Inter	TBD		28 Nov	1–0	24 Apr	13 Mar	23 Jan	6 Mar	5–1	1 May
Kaohsiung Attackers Reserves	1 May	17 Apr		23 Jan	0–5	24 Apr	0–1	1–1	14 Mar	2–1
MFA Taipei	10 Apr	30 Jan	0–1		1–1	12 Dec	20 Feb	24 Apr	0–0	28 Nov
Ming Chuan University	28 Nov	5 Dec	30 Jan	13 Mar		2–0	1 May	10 Apr	24 Jan	1–1
National University of Kaohsiung	6 Mar	2–2	5 Dec	1 May	20 Feb		10 Apr	28 Nov	3–0	23 Jan
New Taipei Hang Yuan Reserves	2–0	2–3	6 Mar	TBD	12 Dec	2–0		30 Jan	17 Apr	24 Apr
Sunny Bank AC Taipei Reserves	23 Jan	1–3	20 Feb	5 Dec	0–1	17 Apr	2–2		1 May	13 Mar
Taichung City	24 Apr	10 Apr	2–2	6 Mar	0–2	31 Jan	28 Nov	12 Dec		TBD
Taichung San Hai Tun NTUS	7–0	12 Dec	10 Apr	17 Apr	6 Mar	6–1	5 Dec	2–2	21 Feb	

Updated to match(es) played on 21 November 2026. Source:
Legend: Blue = home team win; Yellow = draw; Red = away team win.

=== Results by round ===
Team ╲ Round	1	2	3	4	5	6	7	8	9	10	11	12	13	14	15	16	17	18
Babuza	L	L		L	L	L												
Inter	W	W		W	D	W												
Kaohsiung Attackers Reserves	W	L	D	L	D	W												
MFA Taipei	L	L		D	D	W												
Ming Chuan University	W	W	W	D	D	W												
National University of Kaohsiung	L	W	L	W	D	L												
New Taipei Hang Yuan Reserves	L	D		W	W	W												
Sunny Bank AC Taipei Reserves	W	D	D	L	D	L												
Taichung City	L	L		D	D	L												
Taichung San Hai Tun NTUS	W	W		D	D	L												

Updated to match(es) played on 21 November 2026. Source:
W = Win; D = Draw; L = Loss

== Statistics ==
=== Scoring ===
- First goal of the season:
  (South Korea) Kim Dong-soo (Inter) against New Taipei Hang Yuan Reserves (19 September 2026)

=== Top goalscorers ===
Rank	Player	Club	Goals
1	(South Korea) Park Jun-soo	Inter	6
2	(Japan) Yuu Yamada	Kaohsiung Attackers Reserves	5
3	(Chinese Taipei) Lee Yen-ju	New Taipei Hang Yuan Reserves	4
3	(Chinese Taipei) Lee Yi	Taichung San Hai Tun NTUS	4
5	(Chinese Taipei) Cheng Kai-yi	Taichung San Hai Tun NTUS	3
6	(Chinese Taipei) Chang Che-yang	Sunny Bank AC Taipei Reserves	2
6	(Chinese Taipei) Chao Yu-hsuan	Sunny Bank AC Taipei Reserves	2
6	(Chinese Taipei) Chu Chi-lung	Ming Chuan University	2
6	(Chinese Taipei) Huang Kai-chun	MFA Taipei	2
6	(Chinese Taipei) Huang Shih-lun	National University of Kaohsiung	2
6	(Chinese Taipei) Huang Yi-hsuan	Inter	2
6	(Chinese Taipei) Kao Kuan-yu	Taichung San Hai Tun NTUS	2
6	(South Korea) Kim Yong-soo	Inter	2
6	(Chinese Taipei) Ku Chieh-an	Taichung San Hai Tun NTUS	2
6	(Chinese Taipei) Kuo Chia-cheng	Ming Chuan University	2
6	(South Korea) Lee Ha-neul	Inter	2
6	(Chinese Taipei) Lin Yu-chia	Taichung San Hai Tun NTUS	2
6	(Chinese Taipei) Wang Hsuan	Ming Chuan University	2
17	(Burkina Faso) Check Barro	Taichung City	1
17	(Chinese Taipei) Chang Tien-chun	National University of Kaohsiung	1
17	(Chinese Taipei) Chang Wen-hsiang	New Taipei Hang Yuan Reserves	1
17	(Chinese Taipei) Chen Chun-hsien	New Taipei Hang Yuan Reserves	1
17	(Chinese Taipei) Chen Hsueh-yi	Ming Chuan University	1
17	(Chinese Taipei) Chen Shu-yuan	Sunny Bank AC Taipei Reserves	1
17	(Chinese Taipei) Chen Yen-chih	New Taipei Hang Yuan Reserves	1
17	(Chinese Taipei) Chen Yi-wei	Kaohsiung Attackers Reserves	1
17	(Chinese Taipei) Chen Yu-kai	Sunny Bank AC Taipei Reserves	1
17	(Chinese Taipei) Chen Yu-hsun	MFA Taipei	1
17	(Chinese Taipei) Cheng Chih-hsuan	National University of Kaohsiung	1
17	(Eswatini) Phinda Dlamini	Taichung City	1
17	(Chinese Taipei) Hsieh Ping-hung	MFA Taipei	1
17	(Chinese Taipei) Hsiung Yuan-kuan	Ming Chuan University	1
17	(Chinese Taipei) Hsu Yu-jen	Ming Chuan University	1
17	(Chinese Taipei) Hung Shang-yu	National University of Kaohsiung	1
17	(South Korea) Kim Dong-soo	Inter	1
17	(South Korea) Kim Jae-jung	Inter	1
17	(Japan) Taiki Kita	Sunny Bank AC Taipei Reserves	1
17	(Chinese Taipei) Ku Chien-ming	Taichung San Hai Tun NTUS	1
17	(Chinese Taipei) Li Po-yu	Ming Chuan University	1
17	(Chinese Taipei) Lin Ping-tze	New Taipei Hang Yuan Reserves	1
17	(Chinese Taipei) Liu Chi-chao	Sunny Bank AC Taipei Reserves	1
17	(Chinese Taipei) Lu Yi-hsiu	Babuza	1
17	(Chinese Taipei) Peng Chuan-min	Taichung City	1
17	(Chinese Taipei) Su Yu-che	Ming Chuan University	1
17	(Chinese Taipei) Hayato Takayama	Sunny Bank AC Taipei Reserves	1
17	(Chinese Taipei) Shiryu Tang	MFA Taipei	1
17	(Chinese Taipei) Tang Yi-ting	National University of Kaohsiung	1
17	(Chinese Taipei) Tien Kai-wen	Sunny Bank AC Taipei Reserves	1
17	(Chinese Taipei) Tsai Fu-yu	National University of Kaohsiung	1
17	(Chinese Taipei) Tsang Chia-feng	New Taipei Hang Yuan Reserves	1
17	(Chinese Taipei) Wang Cheng-hsiang	National University of Kaohsiung	1
17	(Chinese Taipei) Wilang Ating	Taichung San Hai Tun NTUS	1
17	(Chinese Taipei) Yang Chih-po	National University of Kaohsiung	1
17	(Chinese Taipei) Yu Cheng-feng	National University of Kaohsiung	1
17	player no. 24	Taichung San Hai Tun NTUS	1

==== Hat-tricks ====
Player	For	Against	Score	Date	Round
(Chinese Taipei) Lee Yi	Taichung San Hai Tun NTUS	National University of Kaohsiung	6–1 (H)	19 September 2026	1
(South Korea) Park Jun-soo	Inter	Sunny Bank AC Taipei Reserves	3–1 (A)	31 October 2026	4

=== Clean Sheets ===
Rank	Player	Club	Shutouts
1	(Chinese Taipei) Chien Wei-ming	New Taipei Hang Yuan Reserves	3
1	(Chinese Taipei) Lin Ying-chun	Ming Chuan University	3
3	(Chinese Taipei) Chen Hsuan-ting	Taichung San Hai Tun NTUS	1
3	(Chinese Taipei) Chen Sheng-han	MFA Taipei	1
3	(Chinese Taipei) Hou Po-yen	Sunny Bank AC Taipei Reserves	1
3	(Chinese Taipei) Hsu Wei-hsiang	Kaohsiung Attackers Reserves	1
3	(Chinese Taipei) Kang Ho-hsiang	Ming Chuan University	1
3	(Chinese Taipei) Kung Po-kai	Taichung City	1
3	(Chinese Taipei) Lee Huan-chung	National University of Kaohsiung	1
3	(Chinese Taipei) Lin Yu-hsiang	Inter	1
3	(Chinese Taipei) Wang Pin-hao	MFA Taipei	1

== See also ==
- 2026–27 Taiwan Football Premier League
- 2026–27 Taiwan Mulan Football League
