= 2017 China League One =

China League One
- Season: 2017
- Champions: Dalian Yifang
- Promoted: Dalian Yifang; Beijing Renhe
- Relegated: Baoding Yingli ETS; Yunnan Lijiang
- Matches: 240
- Goals: 681 (2.84 per match)
- Top goalscorer: (Bolivia) Marcelo Moreno (Colombia) Harold Preciado (23 goals)
- Biggest home win: Shenzhen F.C. 6–0 Dalian Transcendence (Mar 12, 2017) (6 goals)
- Biggest away win: Beijing Enterprises Group 0–4 Beijing Renhe (Apr 22, 2017) (4 goals)
- Highest scoring: Yunnan Lijiang 4–4 Wuhan Zall (Jun 24, 2017) (8 goals)
- Longest winning run: 6 matches Shijiazhuang Ever Bright
- Longest unbeaten run: 18 matches Dalian Yifang
- Longest winless run: 13 matches Baoding Yingli ETS
- Longest losing run: 5 matches Zhejiang Yiteng
- Highest attendance: 43,159; Dalian Yifang 0–1 Baoding Yingli ETS (Oct 28, 2017)
- Lowest attendance: 0 (Note: Baoding Yingli ETS played their home match behind closed doors due to breaches of the Chinese Football Association Regulations.); Baoding Yingli ETS 1–2 Shijiazhuang Ever Bright (Jul 8, 2017)
- Average attendance: 7,739 (Oct 28, 2017)
- All statistics correct as of 29 October 2017.

The 2017 China League One (Chinese: 58同城2017中国足球协会甲级联赛) was the 14th season of the China League One, the second tier of the Chinese football league pyramid, since its establishment in 2004. The league's title sponsor was the e-commerce website 58.com.

== Teams ==
A total of 16 teams are contesting in the league, including 12 sides from the 2016 season, two relegated from the 2016 Chinese Super League and two promoted from the 2016 China League Two.

=== Team changes ===
==== To League One ====
Teams relegated from 2016 Chinese Super League

- Hangzhou Greentown
- Shijiazhuang Ever Bright

Teams promoted from 2016 China League Two

- Lijiang Jiayunhao
- Baoding Yingli ETS

==== From League One ====
Teams promoted to 2017 Chinese Super League

- Tianjin Quanjian
- Guizhou Hengfeng Zhicheng

Teams relegated to 2017 China League Two

- Qingdao Jonoon
- Hunan Billows

=== Name changes ===
- Lijiang Jiayunhao F.C. changed their name to Yunnan Lijiang F.C. in January 2017.

== Clubs ==
=== Stadiums and locations ===
Club	Head coach	City	Stadium	Capacity	2016 season
Hangzhou Greentown ^{R}	(Bulgaria) Zdravko Zdravkov (caretaker)	Hangzhou	Yellow Dragon Sports Center	52,672	CSL, 15th
Hangzhou Greentown ^{R}	(Bulgaria) Zdravko Zdravkov (caretaker)	Hangzhou	Jinhua Sports Center (Note: Hangzhou Greentown decided to move to Jinhua Sports Center for their last four home matches.)	30,000	CSL, 15th
Shijiazhuang Ever Bright ^{R}	(Iran) Afshin Ghotbi	Shijiazhuang	Yutong International Sports Center	29,000	CSL, 16th
Qingdao Huanghai	(Spain) Jordi Vinyals	Qingdao	Qingdao Guoxin Stadium	45,000	3rd
Beijing Renhe	(Spain) Luis García Plaza	Beijing	Beijing Fengtai Stadium	31,043	4th
Dalian Yifang	(Spain) Juan Ramón López Caro	Dalian	Dalian Sports Center	61,000	5th
Wuhan Zall	(China) Chen Yang	Wuhan	Wuhan Sports Center Stadium	52,357	6th
Nei Mongol Zhongyou	(China) Wang Bo	Hohhot	Hohhot City Stadium	60,000	7th
Beijing Enterprises Group	(China) Gao Hongbo	Beijing	Olympic Sports Centre (Beijing)	36,228	8th
Shenzhen F.C.	(China) Wang Baoshan	Shenzhen	Shenzhen Stadium	32,500	9th
Shanghai Shenxin	(Spain) Juan Ignacio Martínez	Shanghai	Jinshan Football Stadium	30,000	10th
Xinjiang Tianshan Leopard	(China) Li Jun	Ürümqi	Xinjiang Sports Centre	50,000	11th
Meizhou Hakka	(Bulgaria) Aleksandar Stankov	Wuhua	Wuhua County Stadium	15,000	12th
Zhejiang Yiteng	(Croatia) Marijo Tot	Shaoxing	China Textile City Sports Center	40,000	13th
Dalian Transcendence	(China) Li Guoxu (caretaker)	Dalian	Jinzhou Stadium	30,776	14th
Yunnan Lijiang ^{P}	(Austria) Kurt Garger	Lijiang	Lijiang Sports Development Centre Stadium	20,000	CL2, 1st
Baoding Yingli ETS ^{P}	(China) Shang Qing (caretaker)	Baoding	Hebei University Stadium	20,000	CL2, 2nd

Location of teams in 2017 China League One

=== Managerial changes ===
Club	Outgoing manager	Date of vacancy	Incoming manager	Date of appointment
Shijiazhuang Ever Bright	(China) Li Jinyu (caretaker)	7 November 2016	(Iran) Afshin Ghotbi	7 November 2016
Shanghai Shenxin	(England) Gary White	23 November 2016	(Spain) Juan Ignacio Martínez	23 November 2016
Dalian Yifang	(Spain) Sergio Piernas Cárdenas	29 November 2016	(Spain) Juan Ramón López Caro	29 November 2016
Zhejiang Yiteng	(China) Duan Xin (caretaker)	1 December 2016	(Brazil) Maurício Copertino	1 December 2016
Shenzhen F.C.	(Netherlands) Clarence Seedorf	5 December 2016	(Sweden) Sven-Göran Eriksson	5 December 2016
Beijing Enterprises Group	(Serbia) Aleksandar Stanojević	30 December 2016	(Bulgaria) Yasen Petrov	30 December 2016
Yunnan Lijiang	(China) Zhang Biao	5 January 2017	(South Korea) Lim Jong-heon	8 January 2017
Meizhou Hakka	(China) Cao Yang (caretaker)	16 February 2017	(Croatia) Vjekoslav Lokica	16 February 2017
Wuhan Zall	(Italy) Ciro Ferrara	20 March 2017	(China) Tang Yaodong	30 March 2017
Beijing Enterprises Group	(Bulgaria) Yasen Petrov	24 April 2017	(China) Gao Hongbo	24 April 2017
Meizhou Hakka	(Croatia) Vjekoslav Lokica	29 April 2017	(China) Cao Yang (caretaker)	29 April 2017
Yunnan Lijiang	(South Korea) Lim Jong-heon	2 May 2017	(China) Zhang Biao (caretaker)	2 May 2017
Baoding Yingli ETS	(China) Zhao Changhong	25 May 2017	(Netherlands) Jo Bonfrère	25 May 2017
Hangzhou Greentown	(South Korea) Hong Myung-bo	25 May 2017	(Bulgaria) Zdravko Zdravkov (caretaker)	25 May 2017
Zhejiang Yiteng	(Brazil) Maurício Copertino	28 May 2017	(China) Wang Jun (caretaker)	28 May 2017
Zhejiang Yiteng	(China) Wang Jun (caretaker)	6 June 2017	(Croatia) Marijo Tot	6 June 2017
Beijing Renhe	(China) Wang Baoshan	8 June 2017	(Spain) Luis García Plaza	9 June 2017
Shenzhen F.C.	(Sweden) Sven-Göran Eriksson	14 June 2017	(China) Wang Baoshan	14 June 2017
Wuhan Zall	(China) Tang Yaodong	9 July 2017	(China) Chen Yang	9 July 2017
Meizhou Hakka	(China) Cao Yang (caretaker)	23 July 2017	(Bulgaria) Aleksandar Stankov	23 July 2017
Dalian Transcendence	(Bosnia and Herzegovina) Rusmir Cviko	8 August 2017	(China) Li Guoxu (caretaker)	8 August 2017
Baoding Yingli ETS	(Netherlands) Jo Bonfrère	9 October 2017	(China) Shang Qing (caretaker)	9 October 2017
Yunnan Lijiang	(China) Zhang Biao (caretaker)	13 October 2017	(Austria) Kurt Garger	13 October 2017

=== Foreign players ===
A total of four foreign players can be registered in a season; however, the number of foreign players is limited to three per CL1 team in the same time. Teams can use three foreign players on the field each game.

Players name in bold indicates the player is registered during the mid-season transfer window.

Club	Player 1	Player 2	Player 3	Former players ^{1}
Baoding Yingli ETS	(Honduras) **Rony Martínez**	(Nigeria) John Owoeri	(South Korea) Ha Tae-goon	(Norway) Lars Sætra
Beijing Enterprises Group	(Austria) Rubin Okotie	(Nigeria) **Victor Anichebe**	(Nigeria) Leke James	(Ivory Coast) Cheick Tioté
Beijing Renhe	(Brazil) Ivo	(Ecuador) Jaime Ayoví	(Kenya) Ayub Masika	
Dalian Yifang	(Argentina) Jonathan Ferrari	(Ivory Coast) Yannick Boli	(Zimbabwe) Nyasha Mushekwi	
Dalian Transcendence	(Bosnia and Herzegovina) Ivan Božić	(Bosnia and Herzegovina) **Eldar Hasanović**	(Sweden) David Fällman	(Brazil) Jaílton Paraíba
Hangzhou Greentown	(Australia) Matthew Spiranovic	(Brazil) Denílson Gabionetta	(Brazil) Anselmo Ramon	
Meizhou Hakka	(Brazil) Japa	(Ivory Coast) **Serges Déblé**	(Sierra Leone) Gibril Sankoh	(Bulgaria) Valeri Bojinov
Nei Mongol Zhongyou	(Brazil) **Davi**	(Brazil) Dori	(Senegal) André Senghor	(Senegal) Malick Mané
Qingdao Huanghai	(Serbia) Đorđe Rakić	(Spain) Martí Crespí	(Spain) Joan Verdú	
Shanghai Shenxin	(Brazil) Biro-Biro	(Brazil) Cleiton Silva	(Spain) Raúl Rodríguez	
Shenzhen F.C.	(Brazil) **Rossi**	(Cameroon) Aboubakar Oumarou	(Colombia) Harold Preciado	(Nigeria) Chinedu Obasi
Shijiazhuang Ever Bright	(Brazil) Adriano	(Brazil) Matheus	(Zambia) Jacob Mulenga	
Wuhan Zall	(Bolivia) Marcelo Moreno	(Ivory Coast) Jean Evrard Kouassi	(Croatia) **Sammir**	(Liberia) Sam Johnson
Xinjiang Tianshan Leopard	(Brazil) Vicente	(Cameroon) Yves Ekwalla Herman	(Senegal) Babacar Gueye	
Yunnan Lijiang	(Brazil) Johnny	(Spain) **Natalio**	(South Korea) Kim Hyun-hun	(Brazil) Kaio
Zhejiang Yiteng	(Brazil) Guto	(Italy) **Federico Piovaccari**	(Netherlands) Romeo Castelen	(Australia) Adam Hughes

Hong Kong/Macau/Taiwan outfield players (Contracts signed before 1 January 2016 do not count for the foreign player slot):

Club	Player 1	Player 2	Former players ^{1}
Beijing Enterprises Group	(Chinese Taipei) Chen Hao-wei	(Chinese Taipei) Wen Chih-hao	
Hangzhou Greentown	(Chinese Taipei) Chen Po-liang		
Meizhou Hakka	(Chinese Taipei) Onur Dogan		(Hong Kong) Lee Chi Ho
Qingdao Huanghai	(Hong Kong) Godfred Karikari		
Shenzhen F.C.			(Hong Kong) Paulinho

- **^1** Foreign players who left their clubs or were sent to reserve team after the first half of the season.

== League table ==
Pos	Team	Pld	W	D	L	GF	GA	GD	Pts	Promotion, qualification or relegation
1	Dalian Yifang (C, P)	30	19	7	4	48	23	+25	64	Promotion to Super League
2	Beijing Renhe (P)	30	18	8	4	48	21	+27	62	Promotion to Super League
3	Shijiazhuang Ever Bright	30	14	12	4	48	34	+14	54	
4	Qingdao Huanghai	30	16	4	10	56	40	+16	52	
5	Wuhan Zall	30	13	8	9	47	40	+7	47	
6	Shenzhen F.C.	30	13	7	10	56	37	+19	46	
7	Shanghai Shenxin	30	10	10	10	53	42	+11	40	
8	Beijing Enterprises Group	30	11	4	15	43	50	−7	37	
9	Hangzhou Greentown	30	8	12	10	31	39	−8	36	
10	Nei Mongol Zhongyou	30	9	8	13	40	47	−7	35	
11	Xinjiang Tianshan Leopard	30	9	8	13	37	52	−15	35	
12	Meizhou Hakka	30	8	9	13	33	39	−6	33	
13	Zhejiang Yiteng	30	8	8	14	35	46	−11	32	
14	Dalian Transcendence	30	8	7	15	34	58	−24	31	
15	Baoding Yingli ETS (R)	30	8	7	15	41	51	−10	31	Relegation to League Two
16	Yunnan Lijiang (R)	30	4	9	17	31	62	−31	21	Relegation to League Two

Updated to match(es) played on 28 October 2017. Source: League table
Rules for classification: 1) Points; 2) Head-to-head points; 3) Head-to-head goal difference; 4) Head-to-head goals scored; 5) Reserve league points; 6) Goal difference; 7) Goals scored; 8) Disciplinary points (1 point for each yellow card, 3 points for each red card); 9) Draw
(C) Champions; (P) Promoted; (R) Relegated

== Results ==
Home \ Away	BDY	BG	BJR	DLT	DLY	HZ	MZH	NMZ	QDH	SHS	SJZ	SZ	WH	XJT	YL	ZJY
Baoding Yingli ETS		1–1	2–2	1–2	1–3	2–1	1–1	3–1	3–2	4–2		0–3	2–2	0–1	5–1	1–1
Beijing Enterprises Group	4–2		0–4	3–1	0–2	2–3	1–0	2–1	2–2	1–2	0–0	3–1	1–2	1–2	3–0	3–0
Beijing Renhe	1–0	2–0		3–2	0–1	2–1	2–1	3–0	3–0	2–2	0–0	2–1	1–0	2–0	0–0	2–0
Dalian Transcendence	1–1	2–4	0–4		2–4	1–0	1–1	1–1	0–3	0–0	1–3	3–3	2–0	1–1	2–1	1–0
Dalian Yifang	0–1	1–0	0–2	2–1		0–1	1–1	1–0	2–1	2–2	2–2	2–1	1–0	4–0	4–0	1–0
Hangzhou Greentown	1–0	0–0	1–2	0–1	1–1		1–0	3–2	2–2	0–0	1–1	2–4	1–1	0–0	2–0	1–0
Meizhou Hakka	1–0	0–1	0–0	3–1	0–2	1–2		1–1	0–2	2–1	0–1	0–1	2–1	2–2	1–1	2–3
Nei Mongol Zhongyou	1–0	1–0	2–0	0–1	0–1	0–0	2–0		2–0	2–2	3–2	3–3	1–3	4–1	1–1	2–2
Qingdao Huanghai	4–0	2–1	0–0	3–1	1–1	4–0	1–2	2–1		1–0	2–0	3–1	3–2	1–0	6–1	4–1
Shanghai Shenxin	2–0	1–2	1–2	3–0	2–4	2–2	2–2	5–0	3–0		0–1	1–3	3–1	2–1	3–0	2–2
Shijiazhuang Ever Bright	0–2	5–1	3–0	1–1	2–2	2–2	1–1	2–1	1–0	2–1		1–1	1–1	2–2	2–1	2–0
Shenzhen F.C.	3–2	5–2	0–0	6–0	0–1	4–1	3–1	0–1	1–2	0–0	0–1		0–1	1–1	2–0	3–1
Wuhan Zall	1–1	2–1	1–1	3–1	1–1	1–0	1–0	2–1	3–0	3–2	0–1	0–2		3–1	1–0	2–2
Xinjiang Tianshan Leopard	3–1	1–2	2–1	1–0	1–0	1–1	1–3	1–4	3–4	1–3	2–2	1–0	2–4		1–0	1–0
Yunnan Lijiang F.C.	2–1	2–1	0–1	2–1	0–1	1–1	2–3	2–2	1–0	1–3	3–4	1–3	4–4	3–3		1–1
Zhejiang Yiteng	2–3	3–1	1–4	1–3	0–1	2–0	0–1	3–0	2–1	1–1	3–1	1–1	2–1	1–0	0–0	

Updated to match(es) played on 28 October 2017. Source: Results (in Chinese)
Legend: Blue = home team win; Yellow = draw; Red = away team win.

== Positions by round ==
Team ╲ Round	1	2	3	4	5	6	7	8	9	10	11	12	13	14	15	16	17	18	19	20	21	22	23	24	25	26	27	28	29	30
Dalian Yifang	2	2	2	2	2	2	2	1	1	1	1	1	1	1	1	1	1	1	1	1	1	1	1	1	1	1	1	1	1	1
Beijing Renhe	7	6	7	5	3	3	1	2	2	2	2	2	3	2	2	2	2	2	2	2	2	2	2	2	2	2	2	2	2	2
Shijiazhuang Ever Bright	4	9	10	9	7	7	10	9	10	8	10	7	8	7	7	5	5	5	3	3	3	3	3	3	3	3	4	4	3	3
Qingdao Huanghai	4	8	4	6	10	6	5	8	9	6	8	5	7	6	4	4	4	4	5	4	5	4	4	4	4	4	3	3	4	4
Wuhan Zall	9	11	9	11	8	9	8	10	8	9	7	3	4	4	5	6	6	6	6	6	7	6	6	7	7	6	6	5	6	5
Shenzhen F.C.	1	1	1	1	1	1	3	3	3	3	4	6	5	5	3	3	3	3	4	5	4	5	5	5	5	5	5	6	5	6
Shanghai Shenxin	7	4	5	4	4	4	4	4	5	5	3	4	2	3	6	7	7	7	7	7	6	7	7	6	6	7	7	7	7	7
Beijing Enterprises Group	12	14	15	15	16	16	16	16	16	14	16	15	13	12	8	9	9	9	10	8	10	9	9	9	9	9	9	8	8	8
Hangzhou Greentown	3	7	6	8	6	8	6	5	7	11	11	11	11	11	12	12	12	12	12	12	12	8	8	8	8	8	8	9	9	9
Nei Mongol Zhongyou	11	15	16	16	14	14	11	13	12	12	13	13	15	15	14	14	14	13	13	13	13	13	13	13	14	14	14	12	11	10
Xinjiang Tianshan Leopard	14	12	13	14	13	12	13	11	11	7	9	10	9	9	10	8	8	8	8	10	8	10	10	10	10	10	10	10	10	11
Meizhou Hakka	15	9	10	12	11	13	14	12	13	13	12	12	14	13	13	13	13	14	14	14	14	16	16	15	12	11	11	11	12	12
Zhejiang Yiteng	6	3	3	3	5	5	7	7	4	4	6	8	6	8	9	10	10	11	11	9	11	12	12	12	11	13	13	14	14	13
Dalian Transcendence	16	16	12	7	9	10	9	6	6	10	5	9	10	10	11	11	11	10	9	11	9	11	11	11	13	12	12	13	13	14
Baoding Yingli ETS	9	5	8	10	12	11	12	14	14	15	15	16	16	16	16	16	16	16	16	16	16	15	15	14	15	15	15	15	15	15
Yunnan Lijiang	12	13	14	13	15	15	15	15	15	16	14	14	12	14	15	15	15	15	15	15	15	14	14	16	16	16	16	16	16	16

Winner; promote to Super League
Runner-up; promote to Super League
Relegate to League Two

Source: Table by round (in Chinese)

== Goalscorers ==
=== Top scorers ===
Rank	Player	Club	Total
1	(Colombia) Harold Preciado	Shenzhen F.C.	23
1	(Bolivia) Marcelo Martins Moreno ^{2}	Wuhan Zall	23
3	(Ecuador) Jaime Ayoví	Beijing Renhe	20
4	(Serbia) Đorđe Rakić	Qingdao Huanghai	19
5	(Brazil) Cleiton Silva	Shanghai Shenxin	17
6	(Zimbabwe) Nyasha Mushekwi	Dalian Yifang	16
6	(Ivory Coast) Yannick Boli	Dalian Yifang	16
6	(Senegal) André Senghor	Nei Mongol Zhongyou	16
9	(Senegal) Babacar Gueye	Xinjiang Tianshan Leopard	15
10	(Zambia) Jacob Mulenga	Shijiazhuang Ever Bright	14
10	(Brazil) Matheus Leite Nascimento	Shijiazhuang Ever Bright	14
12	(South Korea) Ha Tae-kyun	Baoding Yingli ETS	13
12	(Cameroon) Aboubakar Oumarou	Shenzhen F.C.	13
12	(Nigeria) John Owoeri	Baoding Yingli ETS	13
15	(Brazil) Augusto Pacheco Fraga	Zhejiang Yiteng	12
15	(Brazil) Dorielton	Nei Mongol Zhongyou	12

Last updated: 28 October 2017
Source: SINA

- ^2 Winner of Golden Boot.

=== Hat-tricks ===
Player	For	Against	Result	Date	Ref.
(Colombia) Harold Preciado	Shenzhen F.C.	Dalian Transcendence	6–0	12 March 2017	
(Cameroon) Aboubakar Oumarou	Shenzhen F.C.	Hangzhou Greentown	4–1	17 June 2017	
(Ecuador) Jaime Ayoví	Beijing Renhe	Zhejiang Yiteng	4–1	19 August 2017	
(South Korea) Ha Tae-kyun	Baoding Yingli ETS	Yunnan Lijiang	5–1	3 September 2017	
(Ivory Coast) Yannick Boli	Dalian Yifang	Shanghai Shenxin	4–2	23 September 2017	
(Spain) Joan Verdú	Qingdao Huanghai	Yunnan Lijiang	6–1	14 October 2017	

== Awards ==
The awards of 2017 China League One were announced on 2 November 2017.

- Most valuable player: (Brazil) Matheus (Shijiazhuang Ever Bright)
- Golden Boot: (Bolivia) Marcelo Moreno (Wuhan Zall)
- Best goalkeeper: (China) Zhang Lie (Beijing Renhe)
- Young Player of the Year: (China) Wang Jinxian (Dalian Yifang)
- Best coach: (Spain) Juan Ramón López Caro (Dalian Yifang)
- Most popular player: (Zimbabwe) Nyasha Mushekwi (Dalian Yifang)
- Fair play award: Wuhan Zall
- Best referee: (China) Niu Minghui

== League attendance ==
Pos	Team	Total	High	Low	Average	Change
1	Dalian Yifang	308,936	43,159	11,061	20,596	+90.6%
2	Shijiazhuang Ever Bright^{†}	243,286	22,183	12,563	16,219	−28.0%
3	Wuhan Zall	192,913	41,113	3,223	12,861	+165.0%
4	Shenzhen F.C.	191,454	28,718	3,096	12,764	+25.7%
5	Nei Mongol Zhongyou	114,847	10,032	5,132	7,656	−19.1%
6	Beijing Renhe	97,416	15,327	2,378	6,494	+43.0%
7	Baoding Yingli ETS^{††}	92,289	10,041	0	6,153	+206.3%
8	Meizhou Hakka	87,973	8,973	1,614	5,865	−9.1%
9	Qingdao Huanghai	87,085	8,726	3,127	5,806	−17.0%
10	Beijing Enterprises Group	78,408	9,385	2,106	5,227	+50.9%
11	Shanghai Shenxin	75,460	7,568	3,280	5,031	+31.8%
12	Yunnan Lijiang^{††}	73,940	9,865	2,781	4,929	−33.0%
13	Hangzhou Greentown^{†}	73,216	8,133	2,151	4,881	−58.4%
14	Zhejiang Yiteng	60,080	11,258	2,358	4,005	+70.4%
15	Dalian Transcendence	43,313	15,772	533	2,888	−33.6%
16	Xinjiang Tianshan Leopard	36,743	4,133	781	2,450	−57.1%
	League total	1,857,359	43,159	0	7,739	+24.3%

Updated to games played on Oct. 28th, 2017
Notes:
^{†} Teams played previous season in CSL.
^{††} Teams played previous season in CL2.
