= Babuza FC =

Taiwanese football club

- Full name: Babuza Football Club
- Short name: BFC
- Founded: 2019; 7 years ago
- Owner: Chang Jun-jie
- Head coach: Hou Fang-wei
- League: Taiwan Football League 2
Home colours	Away colours

Babuza Football Club (Chinese: 半線蒼鷹足球俱樂部) is a football club based in Changhua County, Taiwan which currently competes in the Taiwan Football League 2.

== History ==
Babuza Football Club was founded in 2019 by Chang Jun-jie. The club's first try for the Taiwan Football League 2 is in 2023, which they lost to Tainan Dong Men Cheng and AC Taipei Reserves in the qualifiers. In 2025, they took part in the Taiwan President FA Cup, which was set as the qualifiers for the 2025–26 League 2, yet failed to qualified after finishing 19th in the final standing. In 2026, they qualified from the 2026–27 League 2 qualifiers by defeating Taichung San Hai Tun NTUS.

== Kit manufacturers and shirt sponsors ==
Period	Kit manufacturer	Main shirt sponsor (chest)
2019	Cikers	Cikers
2019	Tor Star	Asics
2020	Tor Star	Shin-Yeh Environmental Management Technology
2021	Cikers	Shin-Yeh Environmental Management Technology
2022	Cikers	Hedone Meal Pub
2022	Entes	various
2023	Entes	Shin-Yeh Environmental Management Technology
2024	Entes	AO-Pay
2025	Hetian	Sin Da Industrial
2026	Hetian	jy
2026–present	Joma	Changhua County Government

== Current squad ==
Note: Flags indicate national team as defined under FIFA eligibility rules; some limited exceptions apply. Players may hold more than one non-FIFA nationality.

No.	Pos.	Nation	Player
1	GK	TPE	Lee Yi-ta
2	MF	TPE	Tsai Chi-chun
3	MF	TPE	Chang Chih-kai
7	DF	TPE	Li Chung-yun (captain)
8	MF	TPE	Lai Yu-wen
9	FW	TPE	Chiang Hao-ting
10	MF	TPE	Lai Po-jung
11	DF	TPE	Wu Meng-chi
12	MF	TPE	Lu Yi-hsiu
13	MF	TPE	Chen Yun-han
14	MF	TPE	Ho Kuan-yi
15	DF	TPE	Chang Yu-jui
16	MF	TPE	Liao Tzu-hao
17	DF	TPE	Chang Jun-jie
18	FW	TPE	Liang Yao-ming
19	FW	TPE	Lai Chun-peng
21	MF	TPE	Ku Cheng-han

No.	Pos.	Nation	Player
22	MF	TPE	Chan Ping-hsun
30	FW	TPE	Lin Chi-jui
31	GK	TPE	Meng Fan-yu
32	FW	TPE	Chen Ting-wei
34	FW	FRA	Nicolas Noyon
35	FW	TPE	Huang Chung-nai
38	FW	TPE	Chang Han-yuan
39	DF	TPE	Chen Hsu-tung
40	DF	TPE	Chou Cheng-chung
43	GK	TPE	Lee Jui-nan (on loan from Taichung Futuro Reserves)
47	DF	TPE	Yang Chen-yu
50	DF	TPE	Lu Yu-wei
69	MF	TPE	Jhih-jie Men-nuo
77	MF	TPE	Liao Wen-hao
89	GK	TPE	Chiu Ching-yang
98	GK	TPE	Lin Huan-pin

== Head coaches ==
Head coach	Nat.	Tenure
Hung Yi-yu	Taiwan	2022
Liao Tzu-hao	Taiwan	2023–2025
Hou Fang-wei	Taiwan	2026–present
