= People's Stadium (disambiguation) =

The People's Stadium may refer to various stadiums, including:

- People's Football Stadium
- Hohhot People's Stadium
- Dalian People's Stadium
- Sosnowiec People's Stadium
- Xiamen People's Stadium
- People's Stadium, Seychelles
- Ferenc Puskás Stadium, formerly People's Stadium (Népstadion)
- Baoding People's Stadium
- Guangdong Provincial People's Stadium
