= Yang Wanshun =

Chinese footballer (born 1996)

Yang Wanshun 杨万顺
Personal information
- Date of birth: 16 January 1996 (age 30)
- Place of birth: Jinan, Shandong, China
- Height: 1.78 m (5 ft 10 in)
- Positions: Left winger; central midfielder

Team information
- Current team: Ji'nan Xingzhou

Youth career
- Tianjin Songjiang

Senior career*
Years	Team	Apps	(Gls)
2015–2016	Tianjin Songjiang	6	(0)
2016	→ Yancheng Dingli (loan)	20	(7)
2017	Yancheng Dingli	4	(0)
2017	Guangzhou R&F	0	(0)
2018–2021	Tianjin TEDA	18	(0)
2022-	Ji'nan Xingzhou	0	(0)
- * Club domestic league appearances and goals as of 5 May 2022

Yang Wanshun (Chinese: 杨万顺; pinyin: Yáng Wànshùn; born 16 January 1996) is a Chinese footballer who currently plays for China League Two side Ji'nan Xingzhou.

== Club career ==
Yang Wanshun started his professional football career in 2015 when he was promoted to China League One side Tianjin Songjiang's first team squad. On 4 April 2015, he made his senior debut in a 2–0 away defeat against Hunan Billows, coming on as a substitute for Zhang Cheng in the 78th minute. Although making eight appearances for the club in the first half of the season, he was degraded to the reserve team in July 2015.

Yang joined China League Two side Yancheng Dingli along with teammate Yang Fan in 2016 season. He made a permanent transfer to Yancheng Dingli in 2017 after promising performances in the 2016 season, scoring seven goals in 20 appearances. Yang transferred to Chinese Super League side Guangzhou R&F in July 2017.

On 28 February 2018, Yang transferred to fellow top tier club Tianjin TEDA after a successful trial. He made his debut for the club on 3 March 2018 in a 1–1 home draw against Hebei China Fortune, coming on for Li Yuanyi in the 90th minute.

== Career statistics ==
As of 31 December 2020.

Appearances and goals by club, season and competition
Club	Season	League			National Cup		Continental		Other		Total	
Club	Season	Division	Apps	Goals	Apps	Goals	Apps	Goals	Apps	Goals	Apps	Goals
Tianjin Songjiang	2015	China League One	6	0	2	0	-		-		8	0
Yancheng Dingli (loan)	2016	China League Two	20	7	1	0	-		-		21	7
Yancheng Dingli	2017	China League Two	4	0	0	0	-		-		4	0
Guangzhou R&F	2017	Chinese Super League	0	0	0	0	-		-		0	0
Tianjin TEDA	2018	Chinese Super League	13	0	2	0	-		-		15	0
Tianjin TEDA	2019	Chinese Super League	1	0	0	0	-		-		1	0
Tianjin TEDA	Total		14	0	2	0	0	0	0	0	16	0
Career total			44	7	5	0	0	0	0	0	49	7
