= Fan Zhiqiang =

Chinese association football player

Personal information
- Date of birth: 22 August 1988 (age 38)
- Height: 1.80 m (5 ft 11 in)
- Position: Forward

Team information
- Current team: Tianjin Shengde

Youth career
- 2004–2011: Tianjin TEDA
- 2009–2011: Tianjin Normal University

Senior career*
| Years | Team | Apps | (Gls) |
| 2011–2016 | Tianjin TEDA | 1 | (0) |
| 2013 | → Shenzhen Fengpeng (loan) | 11 | (4) |
| 2014 | → Tianjin Huaruide (loan) | | |
| 2014 | → Dalian Transcendence (loan) | 8 | (4) |
| 2016 | → Jiangxi Liansheng (loan) | 13 | (8) |
| 2017–2019 | Nantong Zhiyun | 31 | (5) |
| 2022- | Tianjin Shengde | 0 | (0) |
- * Club domestic league appearances and goals as of 29 April 2022

Fan Zhiqiang (simplified Chinese: 范志强; traditional Chinese: 范志強; pinyin: Fàn Zhìqiáng; born 22 August 1988) is a Chinese footballer who plays for Tianjin Shengde.

== Club career ==
Fan Zhiqiang would join the Tianjin TEDA youth team at age 15 before being selected to represent Tianjin in the 2009 National Games where in the final group game, Tianjin lost to Beijing, knocking them out of the competition and leaving Fan dissatisfied with the referee’s officiating he chased the referee along with several team mates he was severely fined by the Chinese Football Association and was suspended for two years. Despite being heavily fined and given a two year suspension he still remained with Tianjin TEDA and joined Tianjin Normal University to continue with his studies while also representing their college team and China in the Football at the 2011 Summer Universiade.

After his suspension ended, Fan was promoted to the senior team of Tianjin TEDA and on 2 October 2011 he would make his professional debut in a league game against Changchun Yatai in a 2-1 defeat.

On 27 January 2017, fan joined third tier football club Nantong Zhiyun. He would go on to establish himself as a regular within the team and in the 2018 China League Two season he would help guide to club to a runners-up position and promotion to the second division.

== Career statistics ==
=== Club statistics ===
As of 10 July 2019.

| Club | Season | League | | | Cup | | Other | | Total | |
| Club | Season | Division | Apps | Goals | Apps | Goals | Apps | Goals | Apps | Goals |
|---|---|---|---|---|---|---|---|---|---|---|
| Tianjin TEDA | 2011 | Chinese Super League | 1 | 0 | 0 | 0 | 0 | 0 | 1 | 0 |
| Tianjin TEDA | 2012 | Chinese Super League | 0 | 0 | 0 | 0 | 0 | 0 | 0 | 0 |
| Tianjin TEDA | 2013 | Chinese Super League | 0 | 0 | 0 | 0 | 0 | 0 | 0 | 0 |
| Tianjin TEDA | 2015 | Chinese Super League | 0 | 0 | 0 | 0 | 0 | 0 | 0 | 0 |
| Tianjin TEDA | Total | | 1 | 0 | 0 | 0 | 0 | 0 | 1 | 0 |
| Shenzhen Fengpeng (loan) | 2013 | China League Two | 11 | 4 | 0 | 0 | 0 | 0 | 11 | 4 |
| Dalian Transcendence (loan) | 2014 | China League Two | 8 | 4 | 0 | 0 | 0 | 0 | 8 | 4 |
| Jiangxi Liansheng (loan) | 2016 | China League Two | 8 | 6 | 0 | 0 | 5 (Note: Appearances in the China League Two playoffs) | 2 | 13 | 8 |
| Nantong Zhiyun | 2017 | China League Two | 18 | 5 | 1 (Note: Appearances in the Chinese FA Cup) | 0 | 2 | 0 | 21 | 5 |
| Nantong Zhiyun | 2018 | China League Two | 11 | 0 | 0 | 0 | 0 | 0 | 11 | 0 |
| Nantong Zhiyun | Total | | 29 | 5 | 1 | 0 | 2 | 0 | 32 | 5 |
| Career total | | | 57 | 19 | 1 | 0 | 7 | 2 | 65 | 21 |

== Honours ==
=== Club ===
- Chinese FA Cup: 2011
