= Harold Preciado =

Colombian footballer (born 1994)

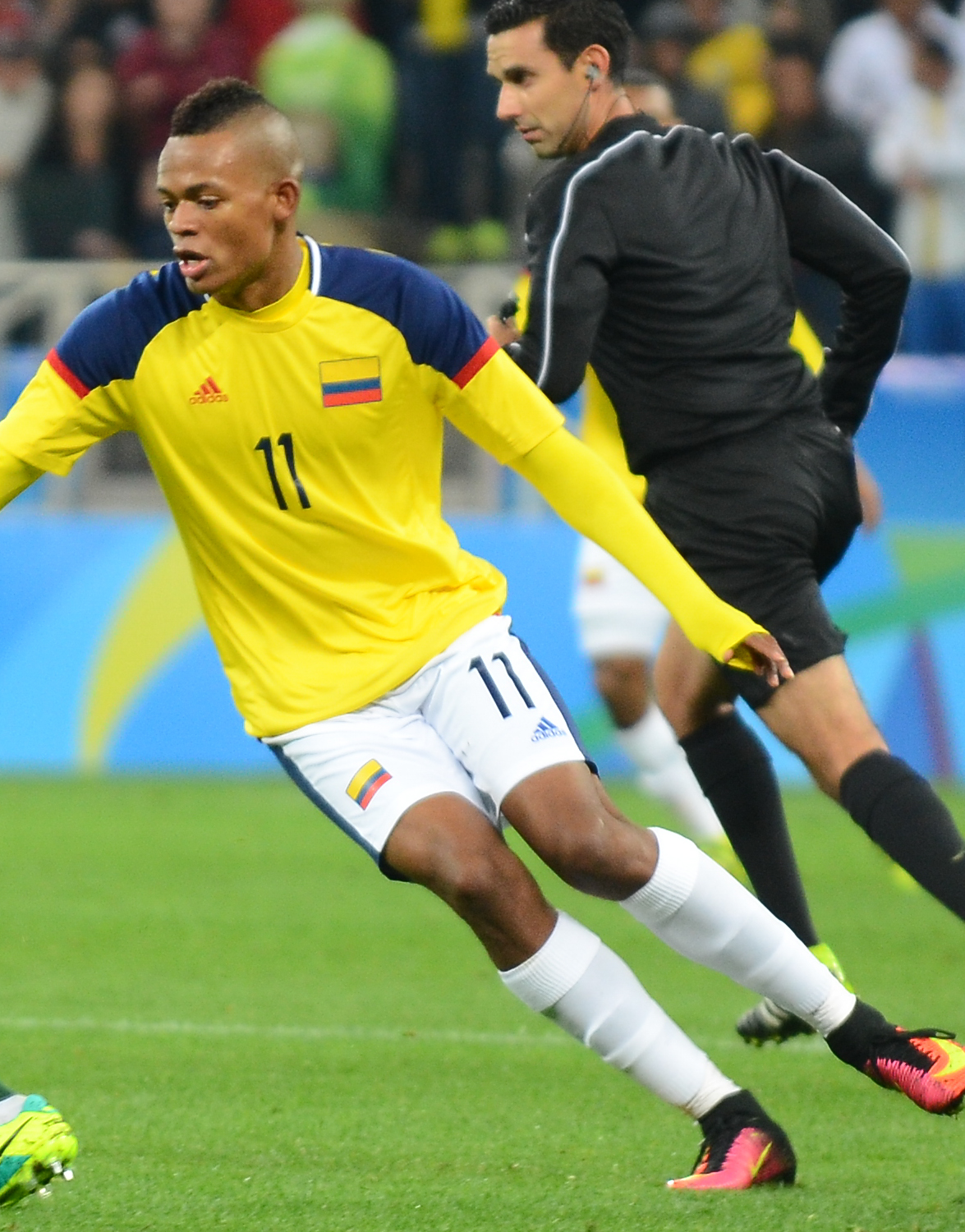
- Preciado with Colombia at the 2016 Summer Olympics

Personal information
- Full name: Harold Fabián Preciado Villarreal
- Date of birth: 1 June 1994 (age 32)
- Place of birth: Tumaco, Nariño, Colombia
- Height: 1.85 m (6 ft 1 in)
- Position: Forward

Senior career*
| Years | Team | Apps | (Gls) |
| 2013–2016 | Deportivo Cali | 80 | (41) |
| 2014 | → Jaguares de Córdoba (loan) | 40 | (22) |
| 2017–2020 | Shenzhen FC | 104 | (57) |
| 2021 | Deportivo Cali | 23 | (13) |
| 2022–2024 | Santos Laguna | 78 | (37) |

International career^{‡}
| 2016 | Colombia Olympic | 7 | (1) |
| 2022 | Colombia | 2 | (0) |
- * Club domestic league appearances and goals as of 07:45, 5 March 2024 (UTC) ‡ National team caps and goals as of 30 January 2022

Harold Fabián Preciado Villarreal (Latin American Spanish: [ˈxaɾol(d) pɾeˈsjaðo]; born 1 June 1994) is a Colombian professional footballer who plays as a forward. Preciado has been suspended for doping violations until 7 March 2027.

== Club career ==
=== Deportivo Cali ===
Harold Preciado would start his senior career with top-tier club Deportivo Cali in the 2013 Categoría Primera A season. The following season he was loaned out to second-tier club Jaguares de Córdoba where he immediately established himself as a vital member of their team, going on to win the division title and promotion with them. This saw Deportivo Cali incorporate Harold back into the team and he would immediately repay them by winning the 2015 Categoría Primera A: Apertura for them.

=== Shenzhen FC ===
On 7 February 2017, Harold joined second tier Chinese football club Shenzhen FC for the start of the 2017 China League One campaign. In his debut appearance he would score a hat-trick on 12 March 2017 against Dalian Transcendence F.C. in a league game that ended in a 6–0 victory. At the end of the campaign he would personally be the top goalscorer in the division. The following season he was able to maintain his form and go on to gain promotion with Shenzhen to the top tier at the end of the 2018 China League One campaign.

=== Return to Deportivo Cali ===
On 10 July 2021, Preciado returned to Deportivo Cali. He made his debut on 17 July in a match against Santa Fe. He finished the tournament as the top scorer with 13 goals, securing Cali's tenth league title.

=== Santos Laguna ===
On 29 January 2022, Preciado joined Mexican club Santos Laguna.

On 6 March 2024, Mexico's Anti-Doping Committee provisionally suspended Preciado for alleged doping. Six months later, Santos Laguna terminated the player's contract following the confirmation of his failed drug test. On 7 March 2025, Preciado was issued a three-year ban for doping offenses.

== International career ==
Preciado was named in Colombia's provisional squad for Copa América Centenario but was cut from the final squad. Preciado played a vital role in Colombia's qualification to the Olympics and played every game in the Rio olympics.

Preciado made his debut for the senior national team on 16 January 2022 in a 2–1 home win over Honduras.

== Career statistics ==
As of match played 1 March 2024

Appearances and goals by club, season and competition
| Club | Season | League | | | Cup | | Continental | | Other | | Total | |
| Club | Season | Division | Apps | Goals | Apps | Goals | Apps | Goals | Apps | Goals | Apps | Goals |
|---|---|---|---|---|---|---|---|---|---|---|---|---|
| Deportivo Cali | 2013 | Categoría Primera A | 6 | 0 | 0 | 0 | — | | — | | 6 | 0 |
| Deportivo Cali | 2015 | Categoría Primera A | 46 | 28 | 6 | 0 | — | | — | | 52 | 28 |
| Deportivo Cali | 2016 | Categoría Primera A | 28 | 13 | 0 | 0 | 3 | 0 | 0 | 0 | 31 | 13 |
| Deportivo Cali | Total | | 80 | 41 | 6 | 0 | 3 | 0 | 0 | 0 | 89 | 41 |
| Jaguares de Córdoba (loan) | 2014 | Categoría Primera B | 40 | 22 | 0 | 0 | — | | — | | 40 | 22 |
| Shenzhen FC | 2017 | China League One | 29 | 23 | 0 | 0 | — | | — | | 29 | 23 |
| Shenzhen FC | 2018 | China League One | 30 | 24 | 0 | 0 | — | | — | | 30 | 24 |
| Shenzhen FC | 2019 | Chinese Super League | 25 | 5 | 0 | 0 | — | | — | | 25 | 5 |
| Shenzhen FC | 2020 | Chinese Super League | 20 | 5 | 1 | 0 | — | | — | | 21 | 5 |
| Shenzhen FC | Total | | 104 | 57 | 1 | 0 | — | | — | | 105 | 57 |
| Deportivo Cali | 2021 | Categoría Primera A | 23 | 13 | 4 | 0 | — | | — | | 27 | 13 |
| Santos Laguna | 2021–22 | Liga MX | 14 | 6 | — | | 2 | 0 | — | | 16 | 6 |
| Santos Laguna | 2022–23 | Liga MX | 39 | 15 | — | | — | | 2 | 3 | 41 | 18 |
| Santos Laguna | 2023–24 | Liga MX | 25 | 16 | — | | — | | 0 | 0 | 25 | 16 |
| Santos Laguna | Total | | 78 | 37 | — | | 2 | 0 | 2 | 3 | 82 | 40 |
| Career total | | | 325 | 170 | 11 | 0 | 5 | 0 | 2 | 3 | 343 | 173 |

== Honours ==
Deportivo Cali

- Categoría Primera A: 2015–I, 2021–II

Jaguares de Córdoba

- Categoría Primera B: 2014

Individual

- China League One Golden Boot: 2017
- Liga MX Golden Boot: Apertura 2023
