= Gan Yingbo =

Chinese association football player

Personal information
- Date of birth: 22 April 1985 (age 41)
- Place of birth: Chengdu, China
- Height: 1.77 m (5 ft 10 in)
- Position: Midfielder

Senior career*
Years	Team	Apps	(Gls)
2003–2005	Sichuan First City	25	(1)
2006–2007	Chengdu Blades	19	(0)
2008–2010	Sichuan F.C.	42	(1)
2011–2014	Chengdu Tiancheng	24	(1)
2015–2019	Sichuan Longfor	60	(1)

Managerial career
- 2020–: Sichuan Huakun
- * Club domestic league appearances and goals

Gan Yingbo (simplified Chinese: 干颖波; traditional Chinese: 干穎波; pinyin: Gàn Yǐngbō; born 22 April 1985) is a Chinese football manager and a former player.

== Career statistics ==
=== Club ===
As of 10 July 2019.

Club	Season	League			Cup		Other		Total	
Club	Season	Division	Apps	Goals	Apps	Goals	Apps	Goals	Apps	Goals
Sichuan First City	2003	Chinese Jia-A League	3	0	0	0	0	0	3	0
Sichuan First City	2004	Chinese Super League	5	0	0	0	0	0	5	0
Sichuan First City	2005	Chinese Super League	17	1	0	0	0	0	17	1
Chengdu Blades	2006	China League One	8	0	0	0	0	0	8	0
Chengdu Blades	2007	China League One	11	0	0	0	0	0	11	0
Sichuan F.C.	2008	China League One	18	0	0	0	0	0	18	0
Sichuan F.C.	2009	China League One	24	1	0	0	0	0	24	1
Sichuan F.C.	2010	China League Two			0	0	0	0		
Chengdu Blades	2011	Chinese Super League	2	0	0	0	0	0	2	0
Chengdu Blades	2012	China League One	1	0	0	0	0	0	1	0
Chengdu Blades	2013	China League One	7	0	0	0	0	0	7	0
Chengdu Blades	2014	China League One	14	1	1	0	0	0	15	1
Sichuan Longfor	2015	China League Two	19	0	2	0	0	0	21	0
Sichuan Longfor	2016	China League Two	23	0	1 (Note: Appearances in the Chinese FA Cup)	0	0	0	24	0
Sichuan Longfor	2017	China League Two	16	1	1	0	0	0	17	1
Sichuan Longfor	2018	China League Two	2	0	1	0	0	0	3	0
Career total			170	4	6	0	0	0	176	4
