= Taiwan Second Division Football League =

Taiwanese football league

Taiwan Football Challenge League
- Organising body: Chinese Taipei Football Association (CTFA)
- Founded: 2020; 6 years ago
- Country: Taiwan
- Confederation: AFC
- Number of clubs: 10
- Level on pyramid: 2
- Promotion to: Taiwan Football Premier League
- Relegation to: Taiwan President FA Cup
- Domestic cup: Taiwan President FA Cup
- Current champions: Kaohsiung Attackers (1st title) (2025–26)
- Most championships: CPC Corporation; Andy Chen Academy; Flight Skywalkers; Vikings-PlayOne; Taichung Rock; Kaohsiung Attackers (1)
- Broadcaster: CTFA TV
- Website: ctfa.com.tw
- Current: 2026–27 Taiwan Football League 2

The Taiwan Second Division Football League (sometimes called the Taiwan Football Challenge League) (Chinese: 台灣企業甲級升降足球聯賽; pinyin: Táiwān Qǐyè Jiǎ Jí Shēngjiàng Zúqiú Liánsài) is the second-ranked Taiwanese football league run by the Chinese Taipei Football Association (CTFA). This League is directly below the Taiwan Premier League.

== Competition format ==
The Taiwan Football Second Division League's schedule usually runs from July to November, after the initial qualifiers where new entries play own tournament, with top 2 playing last 2 from previous Challenge League season. It currently contains 8 teams that compete in a double leg round-robin tournament, each composed of seven games. After the 14-game schedule is completed, the top team wins the league title and an automatic berth in the following year's Taiwan Football Premier League.

Since 2020, a system of promotion and relegation exists between the Premier League and the Taiwan Football Challenge League (Chinese: 台灣企業甲級升降足球聯賽 l). The top team from the Second Division league is promoted to Premier League and the lowest placed team in the Premier League is relegated to the Second Division League. The runner-up of the Second Division League will play in a qualification tournament with the 7th-placed team from the Premier League.

== Teams ==
Currently, there are 10 teams competing in this league. The league has implemented a promotion and relegation system.

Teams (2026–27)
Team	Chinese name	Home	First Participation
Babuza	半線蒼鷹	Changhua	2026–27
Inter	國際	Taipei	2020
Kaohsiung Attackers Reserves	高雄先鋒預備隊	Kaohsiung	2026–27
MFA Taipei	台北MFA	Taipei	2026–27
Ming Chuan University	銘傳大學	Taoyuan	2021
National University of Kaohsiung	高大NUK	Kaohsiung	2023
New Taipei Hang Yuan Reserves	新北航源預備隊	New Taipei	2025–26
Sunny Bank AC Taipei Reserves	陽信北競預備隊	Taipei	2023
Taichung City	台中市	Taichung	2026–27
Taichung San Hai Tun NTUS	山海屯臺體	Taichung	2026–27

=== Former teams ===
- CPC Corporation (2020)
- Pakarongay (2020)
- Andy Chen Academy (2020–2021)
- Base (2021–2022)
- Kaohsiung (2020–2022)
- Mars (2020–2022)
- Land Home NTUS (2022–2023)
- Saturday Football International (2020–2023)
- Vikings-PlayOne (2020–2023)
- Taichung Rock (2024)
- Taipei Elite (2022, 2024)
- Kaohsiung Attackers (2025–2026)
- MCU Desafio (2024–2026)
- Taichung Rock B (2025–2026)
- Wan Island (2025–2026)

=== Timeline ===
Current team Former team Premier League

== Champions ==
- **Bold** indicates teams that promoted to Taiwan Football Premier League.

Season	Champion	Runner-up	Third place
2020	CPC Corporation F.C.	Inter Taoyuan F.C.	Andy Chen Academy
2021	Andy Chen Academy	**Ming Chuan University F.C.**	Saturday Football International
2022	Flight Skywalkers F.C.	Land Home NTUS F.C.	MARS F.C.
2023	Vikings-PlayOne F.C.	Land Home NTUS F.C.	Inter Taoyuan F.C.
2024	Taichung Rock	NUK Kuo Kuang	Inter Taoyuan F.C.
2025–26	Kaohsiung Attackers	Sunny Bank AC Taipei Reserves	MCU Desafio

== Qualifiers ==
Before each upcoming season, qualifiers will be held to fill up the vacant playing spot. The format each year may be different and depends on the number of teams.

- **Bold** indicates teams that qualified from the qualifiers.

Season	No. of teams	Participants
2020	Not held	
2021	5	Baitimes Flying Squirrels, **FCB+TA**, **Kaohsiung**, Pakarongay, Tsing Hua
2022	4	AC Taipei Reserves, **Base**, Desafio Taipei, **Kaohsiung**
2023	5	**AC Taipei Reserves**, Babuza, **NUK Kuo Kuang**, Tainan Dong Men Cheng, Taipei Red Lions
2024	4	**MCU Desafio**, **NUK Kuo Kuang**, Racing Vikings, Tainan Dong Men Cheng
2025–26	8	Babuza, Hsinchu Xinyi Cosmos United, Inter Taipei, Inter Taoyuan Grey, **New Taipei FJCU**, **Taichung Rock B**, Tainan City TSG Green, **Wan Island**
2026–27	8	**Babuza**, Hsinchu Science City, **Kaohsiung Attackers Reserves**, **MFA Taipei**, **National University of Kaohsiung**, **Taichung City**, Taichung Futuro Reserves, **Taichung San Hai Tun NTUS**
