= Jo Bonfrère =

Dutch footballer and manager (born 1946)

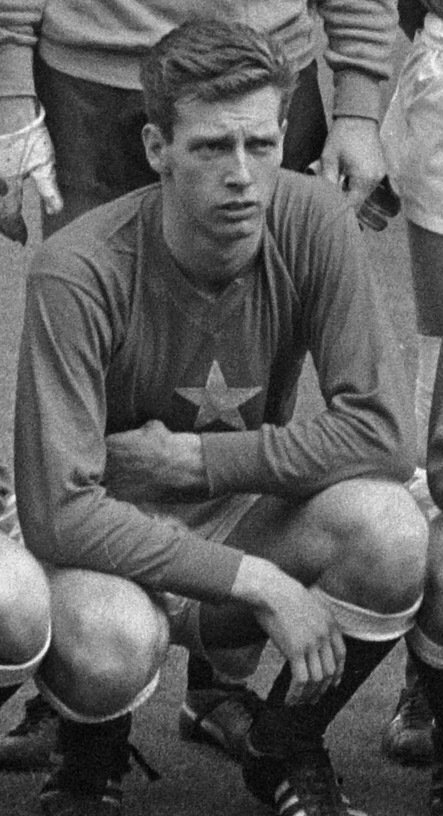
- Bonfrère in 1966

Personal information
- Full name: Johannes-Franciscus Bonfrère
- Date of birth: 15 June 1946 (age 80)
- Place of birth: Eijsden, Limburg, Netherlands
- Position: Midfielder

Senior career*
| Years | Team | Apps | (Gls) |
| 1963–1985 | MVV | 393 | (70) |

Managerial career
- 1983: MVV
- 1985: MVV
- 1988–1990: Verbroedering Geel
- 1991: Nigeria Women
- 1992–1993: Verbroedering Geel
- 1995–1996: Nigeria
- 1996–1997: Qatar
- 1998: Al-Wahda
- 1999–2001: Nigeria
- 2001–2002: Al-Wahda
- 2001–2002: United Arab Emirates
- 2002–2003: Al Ahly
- 2004–2005: South Korea
- 2007: Dalian Shide
- 2007–2008: Al-Wahda
- 2011: Henan Jianye
- 2017: Baoding Yingli ETS
Medal record
Men's football
Representing Nigeria (as manager)
Olympic Games
| First place | 1996 |
Africa Cup of Nations
| Runner-up | 2000 |
- * Club domestic league appearances and goals

Johannes-Franciscus Bonfrère (born 15 June 1946) is a Dutch football coach and former player who spent his entire playing career with MVV. In a extensive coaching career, Bonfrère managed several teams in Africa and Asia. He guided Nigeria to victory in the 1996 Olympic Games.

== Playing career ==
A midfielder, between 1963 and 1985 Bonfrère scored 50 goals in 335 league appearances for MVV, his only club.

== Coaching career ==
=== Nigeria ===
Bonfrère led the Nigeria national under-23 team to a gold medal at the 1996 Olympic Games in Atlanta. He also led Nigeria to the 2000 African Cup of Nations co-hosted by Nigeria and Ghana. Bonfrère led the Super Eagles to the final, where they lost to Cameroon on penalties.

On 7 June 2018, Bonfrère was offered a three bedroom apartment by the Nigerian government, as part of a promise made by General Sani Abacha after winning the gold medal at the Atlanta Olympics.

=== South Korea ===
Bonfrère was hired to coach the South Korea national team in June 2004 to replace Humberto Coelho, who was forced to quit after a draw with the Maldives in a FIFA World Cup qualifier.

The Dutch coach got off to a promising start by crushing a highly rated German squad of World Cup stars such as Michael Ballack and Oliver Kahn, 3–1, with a young Korean team in a friendly match in December 2004. In 2005, South Korea qualified for the 2006 FIFA World Cup under him, but a string of disappointing losses thereafter fueled fan and media ire against Bonfrère.

Bonfrère resigned on 23 August 2005 after poor results in the East Asian Football Championship and a World Cup qualifier loss against Saudi Arabia. The Korea Football Association then hired Dick Advocaat as its third Dutch head coach, with Advocaat angered his predecessor by saying he will be another Guus Hiddink, not a Bonfrère.

=== China ===
Bonfrère joined former Chinese Super League champions Dalian Shide on a one-year contract for the 2007 league season. Despite the team finishing fifth in the league, they were never in contention to win the title, and the club opted not to extend his contract.

On 29 June 2011, another Chinese Super League club Henan Construction announced that Bonfrère would lead the team on a 1+1 contract.

On 25 May 2017, Bonfrère signed a one-year contract with China League One club Baoding Yingli ETS.

=== Return to MVV ===
In February 2015, Bonfrère returned to MVV, being added to the youth team staff.

== See also ==
- List of one-club men in association football
