= Jiujiang Stadium =

Sports venue in Jiujiang, Jiangxi, China

- Location: Jiujiang, China
- Capacity: 31,000

The Jiujiang Stadium is a sports venue in Jiujiang, China. It has a capacity of 31,000 and it is used mostly for football matches. It is also used for athletics. Jiujiang Liansheng are the tenants.
