= Tianjin Huochetou Stadium =

Sports venue in Tianjin, China

Coordinates: 39°10′09″N 117°12′16″E

Tianjin Huochetou Stadium (Simplified Chinese: 天津火车头体育场) is a multi-use stadium in Tianjin, China. Currently used mostly for football matches, its capacity is 12,000 people.
