= Baoding People's Stadium =

Sports venue in Baoding, Hebei, China

Coordinates: 38°51′23″N 115°28′54″E

Baoding People's Stadium (Simplified Chinese: 保定市人民体育场) is a multi-use stadium in Baoding, Hebei province, China. It was currently used mostly for football matches and held 13,000 people. After the renovation from 2013 to 2014, the stadium is mainly used for public exercise. The east, north and south stands were torn down with only the west stand kept, reducing the capacity to around 3,000.

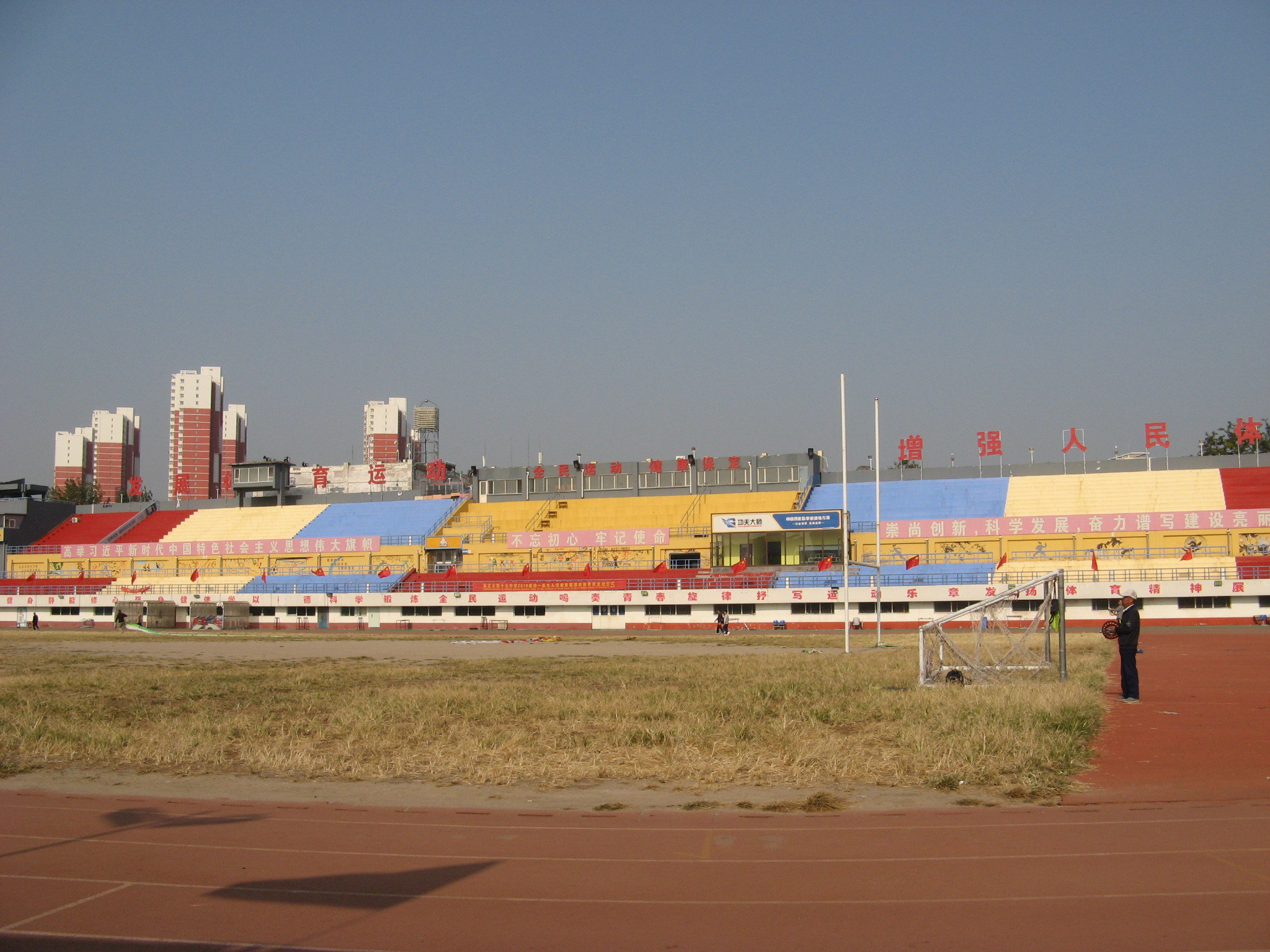
Baoding People's Stadium in 2018
