= David Camhi =

French football manager

Personal information
- Full name: David Camhi
- Date of birth: August 26, 1972 (age 54)
- Place of birth: Nice, France
- Height: 1.78 m (5 ft 10 in)

Managerial career
- Years: Team
- 2011: Shenzhen Ruby (assistant)
- 2012: Chinese Taipei national football team (assistant)
- 2013: Shenzhen Ruby (assistant)
- 2014: CS Sfaxien (assistant)
- 2015: Hangzhou Greentown (assistant)
- 2016: Baotou Nanjiao (Head coach)

David Camhi (born August 26, 1972) is a football manager. In January 2016, he was appointed manager of Baotou Nanjiao F.C. in China.
