= Chinese Taipei Football Association =

Governing body of association football in Taiwan

AFC
- Founded: 1924 (as former Republic of China)
- Headquarters: Xinzhuang District, New Taipei City
- FIFA affiliation: 1954
- AFC affiliation: 1954
- EAFF affiliation: 2002
- President: Vacant
- Website: ctfa.com.tw

Chinese Taipei Football Association
- Traditional Chinese: 中華民國足球協會
- Simplified Chinese: 中华民国足球协会
- Literal meaning: Republic of China Football Association
Transcriptions
Standard Mandarin
- Hanyu Pinyin: Zhōnghuá Mínguó Zúqiú Xiéhuì
- Wade–Giles: Chunghuh Minkuo Tsuch'iu Hsieh-hui
- Tongyong Pinyin: Jhōnghuá Mínguó Zúcióu Siéhuèi
Southern Min
- Hokkien POJ: Tiong-hôa-bîn-kok Chiok-kiû Hia̍p-hōe

Chinese Taipei Football Association (CTFA) is the governing body for football in the Republic of China (commonly known as Taiwan). Its official name in Chinese is the Republic of China Football Association, but due to the political status of Taiwan it is billed abroad as the "Chinese Taipei Football Association" and uses the English initials TPE on its badge.

The CTFA organizes the men's and women's national teams and administers the territory's professional league the Taiwan Football Premier League. As members of East Asian Football Federation its national teams are eligible for the EAFF E-1 Football Championship and the country's membership in Asian Football Confederation allows teams to participate in that organization's club and national team competitions. Chinese Taipei is also a member of FIFA and is therefore eligible to play in the World Cup.

== History ==
Founded in 1924, the Chinese Football Association became members of FIFA in 1931 and competed internationally at the 1936 and 1948 Olympic games. Following the end of Chinese Civil War in 1949, both the People's Republic of China (PRC) and the Republic of China (ROC) contended to be the sole legitimate government of "China", and claimed sovereignty over both mainland China and Taiwan. In May 1954, the ROC was a founding member of the Asian Football Confederation (AFC). At the 29th FIFA Congress held in Bern during June 1954, the PRC objected to the proposed admission of "The China National Amateur Athletic Federation, Taiwan". At the suggestion of FIFA President Jules Rimet, that the congress follow FIFA tradition, remain in the sphere of football, and not allow political questions to be brought into the organization's discussions, Taiwan was admitted to FIFA by a vote of 31 to 21. At the next two FIFA Congresses, in 1956 and 1958, the PRC attempted to have Taiwan excluded from the organization, with the second proposal at the 31st Congress eliciting the support of the USSR.

On 8 July 1958, the All China Athletic Federation (ACAF) notified FIFA of its withdraw as a member of the federation. FIFA stipulations at the time required that once a withdraw be announced it must be confirmed three months later by registered mail. With no such confirmation received, FIFA's Executive Committee still considered ACAF a member and sought the help of Victor Granatkin, the USSR Vice-president of FIFA, to reconcile the organizations. At a meeting of FIFA's Executive Committee in late October 1959, Granatkin indicated that the ACAF would only rescind its withdraw after the expulsion of the Taiwan. At the 32nd FIFA Congress in Rome, the Bulgarian Football Union requested a vote on the expulsion of Taiwan which was rejected by a vote of 45 to 8 with 16 abstentions.

Taiwan was expelled from the AFC in 1974 and was admitted as a provisional member of the Oceania Football Confederation (OFC) the following year, gaining full regular membership in 1976. Taiwan's membership in the OFC was suspended after their national team's participation in the 1978 AFC and OFC World Cup qualification due to "naming issues". At the 41st FIFA Congress in Buenos Aires, Iran introduced another proposal for the cancellation of Taiwan's membership. Unable to come to a majority vote on the issue, the congress voted to entrust the FIFA Executive Committee to come up with a solution by a margin of 57 to 47. On 7 July 1980 FIFA's 42nd Congress approved the Executive Committee's proposal to allow Taiwan to remain a member of FIFA under the name Chinese Taipei Football Association and to readmit the Chinese Football Association. Following this vote, Taiwan was re-admitted the OFC in 1982 before leaving and rejoining the AFC in 1989.

== National teams ==
=== Men's national team ===
Since the Chinese Taipei Football Association's membership with FIFA in 1954, the national teams has never qualified for a World cup. The team achieved their highest FIFA ranking of 121 in July 2018 under the management of Gary White. Due to the political status of Taiwan the national team has competed in both the Asian Football Confederation and the Oceania Football Confederation during its history.

Taiwan reached the semi-finals of the 1960, and 1968 AFC Asian Cups, finishing third in the former. The national team also won gold in football at the 1954 and 1958 Asian Games although it was later determined that some of the players in the team originated from British Hong Kong.

=== Women's national team ===
Since the founding of the FIFA Women's World Cup, the women's team has failed to qualify for the tournament. The team achieved their highest FIFA ranking of 22 in 2003

== Professional leagues ==
The professional first-division league in the Republic of China is Taiwan Football Premier League. Founded in 2017, it contains 8 teams that compete in a series of three round-robin tournaments from April to November for a total of 21 games. Since 2020, the lowest placed team in the Premier League is relegated to the Challenge League with the top team from the Challenge League promoted to the Premier League. The runners-up of the Challenge League play the 7th in the Premier League, with the winner playing in the first Division in the next season.

=== League system ===
Level	League(s) / Division(s)
1	Taiwan Football Premier League; 8 clubs
	↓ 1 club ↑ 1 club
2	Taiwan Second Division Football League; 7 clubs

== Leadership ==
as of 8 November 2025

Name	Position	Source
(Chinese Taipei)	President	
(Chinese Taipei) Yung-Fu Shiao	1st Vice-president	
(Chinese Taipei) Wang Shiao Hsun	2nd Vice-president	
(Chinese Taipei) Jung-Jui Chao	3rd Vice-president	
(Chinese Taipei) Shih-Chung Cheng	General secretary	
(Chinese Taipei)	Treasurer	
(Chinese Taipei)	Technical director	
(Chinese Taipei) Hsien-Chung Yeh	Team coach (men's)	
(Chinese Taipei) Shih-Kai Yen	Team coach (women's)	
(Chinese Taipei)	Media/communications manager	
(Brazil) Jose Amarante	Futsal Coordinator	
(Chinese Taipei)	Referee coordinator	

as of 9 November 2021

Name	Position	Source
(Chinese Taipei) Chiou I-jen	President	
(Chinese Taipei) Hsiao Yong-Fu	2nd Vice-president	
(Chinese Taipei) Hsieh Chun-Huan	3rd Vice-president	
(Chinese Taipei) Shiao Yung-Fu	4th Vice-president	
(Chinese Taipei) Fang Ching-Jen	General secretary	
(Chinese Taipei) Lin Xiu-Yi	Treasurer	
(Chinese Taipei) Yen Shih-Kai	Technical director	
(Chinese Taipei) Wang Jia-Zhong	Team coach (men's)	
(Japan) Kazuo Echigo	Team coach (women's)	
(Chinese Taipei) Chiao Chia-Hung	Media/communications manager	
(Brazil) Jose Amarante	Futsal Coordinator	
(Chinese Taipei) Chuang En-Yi	Referee coordinator	
