= 2013 Guangzhou Evergrande F.C. season =

Guangzhou Evergrande 2013
- Chairman: Liu Yongzhuo
- Manager: Marcello Lippi
- Stadium: Tianhe Stadium
- Super League: 1st
- FA Cup: Runners-up
- FA Super Cup: Runners-up
- AFC Champions League: Winners
- FIFA Club World Cup: 4th
- Top goalscorer: League: Elkeson (24 goals); All: Elkeson (32 goals)
- Highest home attendance: 56,300 vs Guangzhou R&F; 25 August 2013 (Super League)
- Lowest home attendance: 14,817 vs Jiangsu Sainty; 3 March 2013 (Super Cup)
- Average home league attendance: league: 40,428 all: 40,239
Home colours	Away colours

The 2013 Guangzhou Evergrande season is the 60th year in Guangzhou Evergrande's existence and is its 46th season in the Chinese football league, also its 24th season in the top flight. The club won its third consecutive top-tier league title and became the first club in China to win the AFC Champions League.

== Players ==
=== First team squad ===
Note: Flags indicate national team as defined under FIFA eligibility rules; some limited exceptions apply. Players may hold more than one non-FIFA nationality.

No.	Pos.	Nation	Player
1	GK	CHN	Yang Jun
2	MF	CHN	Liao Lisheng
3	DF	CHN	Yi Teng
4	DF	CHN	Zhao Peng
5	DF	CHN	Zhang Linpeng
6	DF	CHN	Feng Xiaoting
7	MF	CHN	Feng Junyan
8	MF	CHN	Qin Sheng
9	MF	BRA	Elkeson
10	MF	CHN	Zheng Zhi (captain)
11	MF	BRA	Muriqui
12	MF	CHN	Zheng Long (on loan from Qingdao Jonoon)
13	DF	CHN	Tang Dechao
14	MF	CHN	Feng Renliang
15	MF	ARG	Darío Conca
16	MF	CHN	Huang Bowen
18	FW	PAR	Lucas Barrios
19	GK	CHN	Zeng Cheng
20	FW	CHN	Ni Bo

No.	Pos.	Nation	Player
21	DF	CHN	Huang Jiaqiang
22	GK	CHN	Li Shuai
23	MF	CHN	Li Zhilang
24	MF	CHN	Shi Hongjun
25	MF	CHN	Peng Xinli
26	MF	CHN	Li Bin
27	FW	CHN	Ye Weichao
28	DF	KOR	Kim Young-Gwon
29	FW	CHN	Gao Lin
30	FW	CHN	Yang Chaosheng
31	DF	CHN	Zhang Hongnan
32	DF	CHN	Sun Xiang
33	DF	CHN	Rong Hao
34	FW	CHN	Hu Weiwei
35	FW	CHN	Shewket Yalqun
36	GK	CHN	Fang Jingqi
37	MF	CHN	Zhao Xuri
39	MF	CHN	Tan Jiajun

=== Reserve squad ===
Note: Flags indicate national team as defined under FIFA eligibility rules; some limited exceptions apply. Players may hold more than one non-FIFA nationality.

No.	Pos.	Nation	Player
41	GK	CHN	Xu Guangliao
42	FW	CHN	Hu Yangyang
43	DF	CHN	Liu Haidong
44	DF	CHN	Kuang Haokun
45	DF	CHN	Guan Haojin
46	MF	CHN	Yang Xin
47	DF	CHN	Luo Jiacheng
48	DF	CHN	Lin Jiawei
49	DF	CHN	Chen Jinchao

No.	Pos.	Nation	Player
50	MF	CHN	Zhong Yecheng
51	MF	CHN	Shen Qi'an
52	MF	CHN	Cai Haojian
53	FW	CHN	Liang Xueming
54	FW	CHN	Gan Tiancheng
55	DF	CHN	Wang Zihang
56	FW	CHN	Li Shaokang
57	DF	CHN	Gong Liangxuan
58	MF	CHN	Li Shunxiang

=== Out on loan ===
Note: Flags indicate national team as defined under FIFA eligibility rules; some limited exceptions apply. Players may hold more than one non-FIFA nationality.

No.	Pos.	Nation	Player
—	DF	CHN	Li Jianbin (at Shanghai Shenhua from 1 January 2013 to 31 December 2013)
—	DF	BRA	Paulão (at Cruzeiro from 6 January 2013 to 31 December 2013)
—	DF	CHN	Li Weixin (at Meixian Hakka from 9 January 2013 to 31 December 2013)
—	MF	CHN	Zhang Xingbo (at Meixian Hakka from 9 January 2013 to 31 December 2013)
—	MF	CHN	Wang Rui (at Meixian Hakka from 9 January 2013 to 31 December 2013)
—	MF	BRA	Renato Cajá (at Vitória from 15 January 2013 to 31 December 2013)
—	DF	CHN	Tu Dongxu (at Meizhou Kejia from January 2013 to 31 December 2013)
—	MF	CHN	Peng Shaoxiong (at Meizhou Kejia from January 2013 to 31 December 2013)
38	DF	CHN	Zhang Yujia (at Meizhou Kejia from January 2013 to 31 December 2013)
—	FW	BRA	Cléo (at Kashiwa Reysol from 25 January 2013 to 1 January 2014)
—	GK	CHN	Dong Chunyu (at Shenyang Shenbei from 29 January 2013 to 31 December 2014)
17	MF	CHN	Gao Zhilin (at Meizhou Kejia from 28 February 2013 to 31 December 2013)
27	FW	CHN	Ye Weichao (at Meizhou Kejia from 30 June 2013 to 31 December 2013)
57	DF	CHN	Gong Liangxuan (at Chengdu Blades from 9 July 2013 to 31 December 2013)
25	MF	CHN	Peng Xinli (at Chengdu Blades from 11 July 2013 to 31 December 2013)

== Technical staff ==
Position	Staff
Head coach	(Italy) Marcello Lippi
Assistant coaches	(Italy) Narciso Pezzotti
Assistant coaches	(Italy) Massimiliano Maddaloni
Assistant coaches	(China) Li Tie
Goalkeeping coach	(Italy) Michelangelo Rampulla
Fitness coach	(Italy) Claudio Gaudino
Reserve team coach	(China) Peng Weiguo (to 26 May 2013)
Reserve team coach	(Italy) Fabrizio Del Rosso (from 16 June 2013)
Reserve team assistant coach	(China) Pang Li (from September 2013)
Medical adviser	(Italy) Enrico Castellacci
Team doctor / Physiotherapist	(Italy) Silvano Cotti
Physiotherapist	(Germany) Georg Meyer
Team doctors	(China) Liu Shulai
Team doctors	(China) Kang Kebao
Team doctors	(China) Wang Shucheng
Chief scout	(Italy) Franco Ceravolo

Last updated: June 2013
Source: Guangzhou Evergrande F.C. (in Chinese)

== Transfers ==
=== In ===
==== Winter ====
Squad number	Position	Player	Age	Moving from	Type	Transfer fee	Date	Source
36	GK	(China) Fang Jingqi	19	(China) Dongguan Nancheng	Transfer	Free transfer (Free agent)	October 2012	
30	FW	(China) Yang Chaosheng	19	(China) Dongguan Nancheng	Transfer	Free transfer (Free agent)	October 2012	
	DF	(China) Li Weixin	19	(China) Dongguan Nancheng	Transfer	Free transfer (Free agent)	October 2012	
34	FW	(China) Hu Weiwei	19	(China) Dongguan Nancheng	Transfer	Free transfer (Free agent)	October 2012	
2	MF	(China) Liao Lisheng	19	(China) Dongguan Nancheng	Transfer	Free transfer (Free agent)	October 2012	
	MF	(China) Zhang Xingbo	18	(China) Dongguan Nancheng	Transfer	Free transfer (Free agent)	October 2012	
	MF	(China) Wang Rui	19	(China) Dongguan Nancheng	Transfer	Free transfer (Free agent)	October 2012	
33	MF	(China) Li Yan	28	(China) Guangzhou R&F	Loan return	N/A	November 2012	
14	MF	(China) Feng Renliang	24	(China) Shanghai Shenhua	Transfer	Undisclosed (~ ¥13 million)	20 November 2012	
9	MF	(Brazil) Elkeson	23	(Brazil) Botafogo	Transfer	€5.7 million	24 December 2012	
	MF	(Brazil) Renato Cajá	28	(Japan) Kashima Antlers	Loan return	N/A	30 December 2012	
	DF	(China) Chen Jianlong	23	(China) Shanghai Shenxin	Loan return	N/A	31 December 2012	
19	GK	(China) Zeng Cheng	25	(China) Henan Jianye	Transfer	Free transfer (End of contract)	1 January 2013	
4	DF	(China) Zhao Peng	29	(China) Henan Jianye	Transfer	Undisclosed (~ ¥10 million)	1 January 2013	
3	DF	(China) Yi Teng	22	(China) Shenzhen Ruby	Transfer	Undisclosed (~ ¥10 million)	1 January 2013	

=== Out ===
==== Winter ====
Squad number	Position	Player	Age	Moving to	Type	Transfer fee	Date	Source
33	MF	(China) Li Yan	28	(China) Guangzhou R&F	Transfer	Undisclosed (Possible free transfer)	9 November 2012	
16	MF	(South Korea) Cho Won-Hee	29	(China) Wuhan Zall	Released	Free transfer (End of contract)	28 November 2012	
48	GK	(China) Zhi Xinhua	25	N/A	Retired	N/A	8 January 2013	
36	FW	(China) Gao Shunhang	20	(China) Qingdao Jonoon	Released	Free transfer (End of contract)	8 January 2013	
14	DF	(China) Li Jianhua	30	(China) Guangzhou R&F	Transfer	Undisclosed	11 January 2013	
21	FW	(China) Jiang Ning	26	(China) Guangzhou R&F	Transfer	Undisclosed	11 January 2013	
26	MF	(China) Wu Pingfeng	31	(China) Guangzhou R&F	Transfer	Free transfer	11 January 2013	
	DF	(China) Chen Jianlong	23	(China) Meizhou Kejia	Released	Free transfer (End of contract)	January 2013	

==== Summer ====
Squad number	Position	Player	Age	Moving to	Type	Transfer fee	Date	Source
13	DF	(China) Tang Dechao	28	(China) Henan Jianye	Transfer	Undisclosed	7 July 2013	
18	FW	(Paraguay) Lucas Barrios	28	(Russia) Spartak Moscow	Transfer	€7 million	10 August 2013	

=== Loan in ===
Squad number	Position	Player	Age	Loaned from	Start	End	Source
12	MF	(China) Zheng Long	25	(China) Qingdao Jonoon	19 July 2013	31 December 2013	

=== Loan out ===
Squad number	Position	Player	Age	Loaned to	Start	End	Source
	DF	(China) Li Jianbin	23	(China) Shanghai Shenhua	20 November 2012	31 December 2013	
	DF	(Brazil) Paulão	26	(Brazil) Cruzeiro	6 January 2013	31 December 2013	
	DF	(China) Li Weixin	19	(China) Meixian Hakka	9 January 2013	31 December 2013	
	MF	(China) Zhang Xingbo	18	(China) Meixian Hakka	9 January 2013	31 December 2013	
	MF	(China) Wang Rui	19	(China) Meixian Hakka	9 January 2013	31 December 2013	
	MF	(Brazil) Renato Cajá	28	(Brazil) Vitória	15 January 2013	31 December 2013	
	DF	(China) Tu Dongxu	21	(China) Meizhou Kejia	January 2013	31 December 2013	
	MF	(China) Peng Shaoxiong	23	(China) Meizhou Kejia	January 2013	31 December 2013	
38	DF	(China) Zhang Yujia	22	(China) Meizhou Kejia	January 2013	31 December 2013	
	FW	(Brazil) Cléo	26	(Japan) Kashiwa Reysol	25 January 2013	1 January 2014	
	GK	(China) Dong Chunyu	21	(China) Shenyang Shenbei	29 January 2013	31 December 2014	
17	MF	(China) Gao Zhilin	22	(China) Meizhou Kejia	28 February 2013	31 December 2013	
27	FW	(China) Ye Weichao	24	(China) Meizhou Kejia	30 June 2013	31 December 2013	
57	DF	(China) Gong Liangxuan	20	(China) Chengdu Blades	9 July 2013	31 December 2013	
25	MF	(China) Peng Xinli	21	(China) Chengdu Blades	11 July 2013	31 December 2013	

== Pre-season and friendlies ==
=== Training matches ===
Date	Opponents	H / A	Result	Scorers
2013-01-15	(China) Meixian Hakka	H	5–0	Elkeson, Barrios, Memet Ali, Zhang Hongnan, Huang Jiaqiang
2013-01-18	(China) Guangdong Youth	H	3–1	
2013-01-29	(Romania) Rapid București	N	0–1	
2013-02-15	(China) Guangdong Sunray Cave	H	0–1	
2013-02-19	(China) Shandong Luneng Taishan	H	3–3	Muriqui (2), Huang Bowen
2013-02-20	(China) Shandong Luneng Taishan	H	1–1	Elkeson
2013-02-23	(China) Meizhou Kejia	H	0–2	
2013-06-15	(China) Shenzhen Ruby	H	3–0	Feng Renliang (3)

=== Bahia de Cadiz Cup 2013 ===
1 February 2013	Guangzhou Evergrande (China)	1–1	(Czech Republic) Sparta Prague	Jerez, Spain
16:00 UTC+1	Zhang Linpeng 37'		Vácha 80'	Stadium: Montecastillo Golf Club

4 February 2013	Guangzhou Evergrande (China)	4–1	(Romania) Concordia Chiajna	Chiclana de la Frontera, Spain
16:30 UTC+1	Elkeson 35', 59'; Peng Xinli 70'; Barrios 86'		Purece 67'	Stadium: Pitch Sancti Petri

6 February 2013	Guangzhou Evergrande (China)	2–4	(Russia) Krasnodar	Chiclana de la Frontera, Spain
16:30 UTC+1	Conca 45+1'; Barrios 75'		Shipitsin 12', 52'; Wánderson 15'; Markov 54'	Stadium: Pitch Sancti Petri

== Competitions ==
=== Overview ===
Competition	Started round	Final position / round	First match	Last match
Chinese FA Super Cup	—	Runners-up	3 March 2013	
Chinese Super League	—	1st	8 March 2013	3 November 2013
Chinese FA Cup	4th round	Runners-up	10 July 2013	7 December 2013
AFC Champions League	Group stage	Winners	26 February 2013	9 November 2013
FIFA Club World Cup	Quarter-finals	4th	14 December 2013	21 December 2013

Updated to match played 22 December 2013
Source: Competitions

=== Competition record ===
As of 22 December 2013

Competition	Record							
Competition	G	W	D	L	GF	GA	GD	Win%
Super League	30	24	5	1	78	18	+60	80.00
FA Cup	6	4	1	1	18	9	+9	66.67
Super Cup	1	0	0	1	1	2	−1	0.00
Champions League	14	9	4	1	36	11	+25	64.29
FIFA Club World Cup	3	1	0	2	4	6	−2	33.33
Total	54	38	10	6	137	46	+91	70.37

=== Chinese Super League ===
==== League table ====
Pos	Team	Pld	W	D	L	GF	GA	GD	Pts	Qualification or relegation
1	Guangzhou Evergrande (C)	30	24	5	1	78	18	+60	77	Qualification to Champions League group stage
2	Shandong Luneng	30	18	5	7	55	35	+20	59	Qualification to Champions League group stage
3	Beijing Guoan	30	14	9	7	54	31	+23	51	Qualification to Champions League qualifying round 3
4	Guizhou Renhe (Note: Guizhou Renhe qualified for the 2014 AFC Champions League Group Stage from winning the 2013 Chinese FA Cup.)	30	11	11	8	40	41	−1	44	Qualification to Champions League group stage
5	Dalian Aerbin	30	11	8	11	40	43	−3	41	

Source: Chinese Super League (in Chinese)
Rules for classification: 1st points; 2nd head-to-head points; 3rd head-to-head goal difference; 4th head-to-head goals scored; 5th goal difference; 6th goals scored; 7th disciplinary points (1 point for each yellow card, 3 points for each red card). Head-to-Head: used when head-to-head record is used to rank tied teams.
(C) Champions

==== Results summary ====
Overall								Home						Away					
Pld	W	D	L	GF	GA	GD	Pts	W	D	L	GF	GA	GD	W	D	L	GF	GA	GD
30	24	5	1	78	18	+60	77	14	1	0	47	5	+42	10	4	1	31	13	+18

Last updated: 3 November 2013.
Source: Competitive Matches

==== Results by round ====
Round	1	2	3	4	5	6	7	8	9	10	11	12	13	14	15	16	17	18	19	20	21	22	23	24	25	26	27	28	29	30
Ground	H	H	A	H	A	H	A	H	A	H	A	H	A	H	A	A	A	H	A	H	A	H	A	H	A	H	A	H	A	H
Result	W	W	D	W	W	W	W	W	W	W	W	D	W	W	W	W	W	W	D	W	W	W	L	W	D	W	W	W	D	W
Position	1	1	3	4	4	3	1	1	1	1	1	1	1	1	1	1	1	1	1	1	1	1	1	1	1	1	1	1	1	1

Updated to match(es) played on 3 November 2013. Source: Chinese Super League Table (in Chinese)
A = Away; H = Home; W = Win; D = Draw; L = Loss

==== Matches ====
Win Draw Loss

8 March 2013 Round 1	Guangzhou Evergrande	5–1	Shanghai Shenxin	Guangzhou
20:00 UTC+8	Conca 50'; Elkeson 61'; Gao Lin 62'; Elkeson 71'; Muriqui 88'	Report	Yang Jiawei 89'	Stadium: Tianhe Stadium; Attendance: 38,997; Referee: Tan Hai; Assistant referees: Su Jige, Mu Yuxin; Fourth official: Fan Qi

16 March 2013 Round 2	Guangzhou Evergrande	3–0	Jiangsu Sainty	Guangzhou
19:35 UTC+8	Elkeson 13'; Zheng Zhi (yellow card) 24'; Elkeson 32'; Elkeson 64'	Report	Eleílson (yellow card) 26'	Stadium: Tianhe Stadium; Attendance: 39,734; Referee: Guo Baolong; Assistant referees: Huo Weiming, Ma Ji; Fourth official: Zhong Jun

29 March 2013 Round 3	Beijing Guoan	1–1	Guangzhou Evergrande	Beijing
19:35 UTC+8	Zhang Xizhe 45'; Zhang Xinxin (yellow card) 45'; Zhou Ting (yellow card) 51'; Piao Cheng (yellow card) 90+2'	Report	Zheng Zhi (yellow card) 28'; Elkeson 60'; Feng Xiaoting (yellow card) 86'; Zhao Xuri (red card) 90+3'	Stadium: Workers Stadium; Attendance: 46,310; Referee: Shaun Evans (Australia); Assistant referees: Zhang Jun, Wen Xiaofang; Fourth official: Ma Ning

14 April 2013 Round 5	Dalian Aerbin	1–2	Guangzhou Evergrande	Dalian
15:35 UTC+8	Zhu Xiaogang (yellow card) 20'; Hoarau 71'	Report	Zhang Linpeng (yellow card) 34'; Elkeson 49'; Barrios 65'	Stadium: Jinzhou Stadium; Attendance: 21,811; Referee: Mohammad Arafah (Jordan); Assistant referees: Xu Peng, Yu Yue; Fourth official: Zhao Zhizhi

20 April 2013 Round 6	Guangzhou Evergrande	6–1	Changchun Yatai	Guangzhou
20:00 UTC+8	Zheng Zhi (yellow card) 9'; Elkeson 30'; Kim Young-Gwon 34'; Elkeson 44'; Elkeson 49'; Conca 73' (pen.); Shi Hongjun (yellow card) 81'; Muriqui 90+1'	Report	Cao Tianbao (yellow card) 45+1'; Zé Carlos (yellow card) 58'; Zé Carlos 69'	Stadium: Tianhe Stadium; Attendance: 32,467; Referee: Zhao Zhizhi; Assistant referees: Zhang Yongjun, Xu Jun; Fourth official: Zhong Jun

27 April 2013 Round 7	Guangzhou R&F	0–2	Guangzhou Evergrande	Guangzhou
19:00 UTC+8	Rafael Coelho (yellow card) 43'; Lu Lin (yellow card) 44'; Jumar (yellow card) 67'	Report	Elkeson 19'; Qin Sheng (yellow card) 56'; Elkeson 77'	Stadium: Yuexiushan Stadium; Attendance: 14,535; Referee: Hajime Matsuo (Japan); Assistant referees: Tong Yong, Lou Fangping; Fourth official: Fu Ming

5 May 2013 Round 8	Guangzhou Evergrande	3–0	Tianjin Teda	Guangzhou
20:00 UTC+8	Conca 17'; Zhang Linpeng (yellow card) 21'; Elkeson 58'; Gao Lin 64'	Report	Liao Bochao (yellow card) 19'	Stadium: Tianhe Stadium; Attendance: 38,112; Referee: Tao Rancheng; Assistant referees: Zhang Yongjun, Zhan Wei; Fourth official: Zhong Jun

10 May 2013 Round 9	Shanghai Shenhua	0–3	Guangzhou Evergrande	Shanghai
19:45 UTC+8	Xu Liang (yellow card) 26'; Moreno (yellow card) 42'; Li Jianbin (yellow card) 60'; Dai Lin (yellow card) 89'	Report	Qin Sheng (yellow card) 28'; Zhao Xuri (yellow card) 50'; Gao Lin 56'; Zhang Linpeng 71'; Gao Lin 84'	Stadium: Hongkou Football Stadium; Attendance: 23,457; Referee: Li Jun; Assistant referees: Zhang Jun, Wen Xiaofang; Fourth official: Xu Fuxin

18 May 2013 Round 10	Guangzhou Evergrande	4–1	Liaoning Whowin	Guangzhou
20:00 UTC+8	Elkeson 39'; Rong Hao (yellow card) 57'; Zhang Linpeng 61'; Barrios 66'; Zheng Zhi (yellow card) 69'; Barrios 81'; Zeng Cheng (yellow card) 90+2'	Report	Jin Taiyan (yellow card) 3'; Zhang Ye (yellow card) 10'; Edu 90+2'	Stadium: Tianhe Stadium; Attendance: 38,443; Referee: Yao Qing; Assistant referees: Zhan Wei, Xu Jun; Fourth official: Wang Di

26 May 2013 Round 11	Hangzhou Greentown	0–1	Guangzhou Evergrande	Hangzhou
19:35 UTC+8		Report	Zhang Linpeng 13'; Feng Junyan (yellow card) 73'	Stadium: Yellow Dragon Sports Center; Attendance: 27,519; Referee: Wang Di; Assistant referees: Wu Lei, Zhan Wei; Fourth official: Xia Jun

29 May 2013 Round 4	Guangzhou Evergrande	4–0	Guizhou Moutai	Guangzhou
20:00 UTC+8	Zheng Zhi 10'; Elkeson 38'; Zhang Linpeng (yellow card) 43'; Huang Bowen 74'; Huang Bowen 90'		Muslimović (yellow card) 62'	Stadium: Tianhe Stadium; Attendance: 38,713; Referee: Huang Yejun; Assistant referees: Tong Yong, Lou Fangping; Fourth official: Fu Ming

1 June 2013 Round 12	Guangzhou Evergrande	0–0	Shandong Luneng Taishan	Guangzhou
20:00 UTC+8	Muriqui (yellow card) 13'; Conca (penalty missed) 28' (pen.); Sun Xiang (yellow card) 65'	Report	Antar (yellow card) 16'; Geng Xiaofeng (yellow card) 27'; Liu Jindong (yellow card) 90+4'	Stadium: Tianhe Stadium; Attendance: 48,013; Referee: Lucien Laverdure (Australia); Assistant referees: Huo Weiming, Liu Guiqing; Fourth official: Zhou Gang

22 June 2013 Round 13	Qingdao Jonoon	1–3	Guangzhou Evergrande	Qingdao
16:00 UTC+8	Bruno Meneghel (yellow card) 13'; Quan Lei (yellow card) 31'; Song Long (yellow card) 41'; Li Zhuangfei (yellow card) 65'; Bruno Meneghel 76'	Report	Conca 56'; Kim Young-Gwon (yellow card) 70'; Kim Young-Gwon 82'; Conca 90+3' (pen.)	Stadium: Qingdao Tiantai Stadium; Attendance: 16,325; Referee: Li Jun; Assistant referees: Zhang Jun, Wen Xiaofang; Fourth official: Chen Gang

25 June 2013 Round 14	Guangzhou Evergrande	1–0	Shanghai SIPG	Guangzhou
20:00 UTC+8	Elkeson 56'; Muriqui (yellow card) 59'	Report	Wang Jiajie (yellow card) 52'	Stadium: Tianhe Stadium; Attendance: 38,994; Referee: Ma Ning; Assistant referees: Ma Ji, Tong Yong; Fourth official: Xia Jun

1 July 2013 Round 15	Wuhan Zall	1–4	Guangzhou Evergrande	Wuhan
19:45 UTC+8	Bentley 32'	Report	Muriqui 1'; Conca 9' (pen.); Elkeson 11'; Muriqui (yellow card) 44'; Zhang Linpeng 80'; Zhao Xuri (yellow card) 89'	Stadium: Wuhan Sports Center Stadium; Attendance: 41,138; Referee: Guo Baolong; Assistant referees: Wu Lei, Yu Yue; Fourth official: Ai Kun

6 July 2013 Round 16	Shanghai Shenxin	0–3	Guangzhou Evergrande	Shanghai
19:45 UTC+8	Liao Chengjian (yellow card) 31'; Liu Wenxi (yellow card) 42'	Report	Zheng Zhi (yellow card) 8'; Zhao Peng (yellow card) 25'; Muriqui 49'; Sun Xiang (yellow card) 54'; Muriqui 69'; Muriqui 82'	Stadium: Yuanshen Sports Centre Stadium; Attendance: 11,975; Referee: Xu Hang; Assistant referees: Mu Yuxin, Zhou Guangya; Fourth official: Zhong Jun

14 July 2013 Round 17	Jiangsu Sainty	1–2	Guangzhou Evergrande	Nanjing
19:40 UTC+8	Ren Hang (yellow card) 57'; Sun Ke 59'; Eleílson (yellow card) 68'; Ren Hang (yellow card) 82' (yellow-red card)	Report	Elkeson 21'; Muriqui (yellow card) 36'; Gao Lin 77'; Zeng Cheng (yellow card) 90+3'	Stadium: Nanjing Olympic Sports Center; Attendance: 58,792; Referee: Shi Zhenlu; Assistant referees: Zhang Jun, Wen Xiaofang; Fourth official: Tao Rancheng

31 July 2013 Round 18	Guangzhou Evergrande	3–0	Beijing Guoan	Guangzhou
20:00 UTC+8	Sun Xiang 12'; Conca 34' (pen.); Feng Xiaoting (yellow card) 49'; Elkeson 66'	Report	Shao Jiayi (yellow card) 23'; Yang Zhi (red card) 31'; Kanouté (yellow card) 36'; Zhang Xinxin (yellow card) 42'	Stadium: Tianhe Stadium; Attendance: 39,984; Referee: Matthew Gillett (Australia); Assistant referees: Tong Yong, Han Wei; Fourth official: Fu Ming

3 August 2013 Round 19	Guizhou Moutai	2–2	Guangzhou Evergrande	Guiyang
19:35 UTC+8	Chen Jie (yellow card) 37'; Sun Jihai (yellow card) 51'; Misimović (yellow card) 58'; Muslimović (yellow card) 58'; Yu Hai (yellow card) 59'; Muslimović 65'; Elkeson 78' (o.g.); Salley (yellow card) 84'	Report	Conca 21'; Zhao Xuri 52'; Zheng Zhi (yellow card) 58'; Sun Xiang (yellow card) 72'	Stadium: Guiyang Olympic Sports Center; Attendance: 45,671; Referee: Wang Zhe; Assistant referees: Wu Lei, Yu Yue; Fourth official: Zhao Zhizhi

12 August 2013 Round 20	Guangzhou Evergrande	3–0	Dalian Aerbin	Guangzhou
20:00 UTC+8	Zhang Linpeng (yellow card) 23'; Muriqui 36'; Zheng Long (yellow card) 49'; Conca 68'; Rong Hao 87'	Report	Chen Tao (yellow card) 16'; Hoarau (yellow card) 80'	Stadium: Tianhe Stadium; Attendance: 39,474; Referee: Ai Kun; Assistant referees: Li Dongnan, Tong Yong; Fourth official: Zhong Jun

16 August 2013 Round 21	Changchun Yatai	1–2	Guangzhou Evergrande	Changchun
19:35 UTC+8	Isac 5'; Lü Jianjun (yellow card) 45+2'; Rezek (yellow card) 88'	Report	Sun Xiang (yellow card) 28'; Elkeson 57'; Conca 66'	Stadium: Development Area Stadium; Attendance: 26,852; Referee: Li Jun; Assistant referees: Song Xiangyun, Yang Li; Fourth official: Guo Baolong

25 August 2013 Round 22	Guangzhou Evergrande	1–0	Guangzhou R&F	Guangzhou
20:00 UTC+8	Conca 53'	Report	Li Wenbo (yellow card) 58'; Bosnar (yellow card) 77'	Stadium: Tianhe Stadium; Attendance: 56,300; Referee: Wang Di; Assistant referees: Ma Ji, Zhan Wei; Fourth official: Ma Li

31 August 2013 Round 23	Tianjin Teda	1–0	Guangzhou Evergrande	Tianjin
19:35 UTC+8	Paartalu 15'; Yang Qipeng (yellow card) 72'; Bai Yuefeng (yellow card) 79'; Cao Yang (yellow card) 90+3'	Report	Zhang Linpeng (yellow card) 90+1'	Stadium: TEDA Football Stadium; Attendance: 18,887; Referee: Chen Gang; Assistant referees: Shao Honggeng, Yang Li; Fourth official: Xu Fuxin

13 September 2013 Round 24	Guangzhou Evergrande	2–1	Shanghai Shenhua	Guangzhou
20:00 UTC+8	Gao Lin (yellow card) 30'; Gao Lin 50'; Elkeson 81'	Report	Schiavi (yellow card) 4'; Wang Changqing (yellow card) 10'; Wang Dalei (yellow card) 23'; Dai Lin (yellow card) 52'; Moreno 54' (pen.); Wang Changqing (yellow card) 72' (yellow-red card); Cao Yunding (yellow card) 77'; Bai Jiajun (yellow card) 90+2'	Stadium: Tianhe Stadium; Attendance: 41,540; Referee: Ai Kun; Assistant referees: Li Dongnan, Ma Ji; Fourth official: Li Jun

28 September 2013 Round 26	Guangzhou Evergrande	4–0	Hangzhou Greentown	Guangzhou
20:00 UTC+8	Zheng Long 41'; Zheng Long 51'; Elkeson 75'; Muriqui 78'	Report	Cao Xuan (yellow card) 23'; Fan Xiaodong (yellow card) 40'	Stadium: Tianhe Stadium; Attendance: 38,894; Referee: Fu Ming; Assistant referees: Zhang Yongjun, Zhan Wei; Fourth official: Zhong Jun

6 October 2013 Round 27	Shandong Luneng Taishan	2–4	Guangzhou Evergrande	Jinan
15:35 UTC+8	Macena 10'; Wang Yongpo (yellow card) 37'; Love (yellow card) 57'; Jin Jingdao (yellow card) 59'; Antar 77'	Report	Zhao Xuri 6'; Rong Hao 39'; Gao Lin 45+2'; Zheng Zhi 64'	Stadium: Jinan Olympic Sports Center Stadium; Attendance: 46,179; Referee: Hajime Matsuo (Japan); Assistant referees: Mu Yuxin, Yang Li; Fourth official: Fu Ming

15 October 2013 Round 25	Liaoning Whowin	1–1	Guangzhou Evergrande	Shenyang
19:35 UTC+8	Yang Yu (yellow card) 18'; Jin Taiyan 31'; Ni Yusong (yellow card) 41'; Ni Yusong (yellow card) 41' (yellow-red card); Zheng Tao (yellow card) 79'	Report	Huang Jiaqiang (yellow card) 9'; Conca (yellow card) 34'; Elkeson (red card) 41'; Huang Bowen 77'; Qin Sheng (yellow card) 90+4'	Stadium: Tiexi New District Sports Center; Attendance: 24,580; Referee: Ai Kun; Assistant referees: Zhang Hongwei, Shao Honggeng; Fourth official: Li Haihe

20 October 2013 Round 28	Guangzhou Evergrande	3–1	Qingdao Jonoon	Guangzhou
20:00 UTC+8	Huang Bowen 19'; Feng Junyan (yellow card) 21'; Muriqui 39'; Sun Xiang (yellow card) 47'; Conca 90+4'	Report	Zhu Shiyu (yellow card) 3'; Yao Jiangshan (yellow card) 5'; Li Peng (yellow card) 18'; Quan Lei (yellow card) 43'; Bruno Meneghel 64'	Stadium: Tianhe Stadium; Attendance: 36,874; Referee: Ma Ning; Assistant referees: Li Dongnan, Ma Ji; Fourth official: Zhong Jun

30 October 2013 Round 29	Shanghai SIPG	1–1	Guangzhou Evergrande	Shanghai
19:35 UTC+8	McBreen 89'	Report	Yi Teng (yellow card) 56'; Feng Junyan 62'	Stadium: Shanghai Stadium; Attendance: 11,397; Referee: Wang Jin; Assistant referees: Huo Weiming, Liu Guiqing; Fourth official: Fu Ming

3 November 2013 Round 30	Guangzhou Evergrande	5–0	Wuhan Zall	Guangzhou
15:35 UTC+8	Elkeson 2'; Conca 6'; Conca (yellow card) 6'; Elkeson 22'; Conca 76'; Gao Lin 80'	Report	Luo Yi (yellow card) 9'	Stadium: Tianhe Stadium; Attendance: 39,874; Referee: Guo Baolong; Assistant referees: Tong Yong, Zhan Wei; Fourth official: Ma Li

=== Chinese FA Cup ===
10 July 2013 Fourth round	Guangzhou Evergrande	7–1	Dali Travel Ruilong	Guangzhou
20:00 UTC+8	Peng Xinli 39'; Ni Bo 48'; Feng Junyan 57'; Peng Xinli 70'; Zhao Peng 74'; Gao Lin 87'; Ni Bo 90+1'		Wang Zhi (yellow card) 4'; Ma Sai 89' (pen.)	Stadium: Tianhe Stadium; Attendance: 37,893; Referee: Zhong Jun; Assistant referees: Wu Sining, Jin Chao; Fourth official: Ma Ye

7 August 2013 Quarter-finals	Guangzhou Evergrande	2–2 (5–3 p)	Hangzhou Daikin Greentown	Guangzhou
20:00 UTC+8	Rong Hao (yellow card) 18'; Yang Chaosheng 39'; Shewket Yalqun 74'		Oguro 36'; Oguro 63'; Cao Haiqing (yellow card) 85'; Wang Song (yellow card) 90+5'	Stadium: Tianhe Stadium; Attendance: 36,114; Referee: Huang Yejun; Assistant referees: Lou Fangping, Zhan Wei; Fourth official: Zhou Yang, Zhou Xingsheng
	Penalties
	Zheng Long (penalty scored); Hu Weiwei (penalty scored); Feng Junyan (penalty scored); Yi Teng (penalty scored); Rong Hao (penalty scored)		(penalty missed) Wang Song; (penalty scored) Oguro; (penalty scored) Jiang Bo; (penalty scored) Angan

23 November 2013 Semi-finals; First leg	Beijing Guoan	0–1	Guangzhou Evergrande	Beijing
19:00 UTC+8	Zhang Xinxin (yellow card) 26'; Zhang Xizhe (yellow card) 35'; Xu Yunlong (yellow card) 59'		Zhao Xuri (yellow card) 38'; Muriqui (yellow card) 45'; Muriqui 79'	Stadium: Workers Stadium; Attendance: 49,140; Referee: Zhong Jun; Assistant referees: Zhang Jun, Wen Xiaofang; Fourth official: Shi Zhenlu

27 November 2013 Semi-finals; Second leg	Guangzhou Evergrande	6–3 (7–3 agg.)	Beijing Guoan	Guangzhou
20:00 UTC+8	Elkeson 33'; Conca 43'; Zhang Linpeng 58'; Huang Bowen 70'; Zeng Cheng (yellow card) 79'; Muriqui 79'; Sun Xiang (yellow card) 82'; Conca 89'		Utaka 55'; Utaka 67'; Utaka 69'; Kanouté (yellow card) 72'; Krimets (yellow card) 76'; Zhang Chengdong (yellow card) 82'; Kanouté (yellow card) 90+1' (yellow-red card)	Stadium: Tianhe Stadium; Attendance: 35,800; Referee: Li Jun; Assistant referees: Wu Lei, Yu Yue; Fourth official: Zhou Gang

1 December 2013 Final; First leg	Guizhou Moutai	2–0	Guangzhou Evergrande	Guiyang
16:00 UTC+8	Salley (yellow card) 20'; Qu Bo (yellow card) 38'; Yu Hai 51'; Sun Jihai (yellow card) 53'; Yu Hai 68'		Muriqui (yellow card) 20'; Elkeson (red card) 31'; Zhao Xuri (yellow card) 75'; Zhang Linpeng (yellow card) 90+3'	Stadium: Guiyang Olympic Sports Center; Attendance: 47,893; Referee: Hiroyuki Kimura (Japan); Assistant referees: Li Dongnan, Tong Yong; Fourth official: Fu Ming

7 December 2013 Final; Second leg	Guangzhou Evergrande	2–1 (2–3 agg.)	Guizhou Moutai	Guangzhou
16:00 UTC+8	Gao Lin (yellow card) 15'; Feng Junyan 59'; Conca 61'; Qin Sheng (yellow card) 71'; Zheng Zhi (yellow card) 90'; Sun Xiang (yellow card) 90+5'		Qu Bo (yellow card) 22'; Yu Hai 27'	Stadium: Tianhe Stadium; Attendance: 46,898; Referee: Hiroyoshi Takayama (Japan); Assistant referees: Huo Weiming, Liu Guiqing; Fourth official: Ma Ning

=== Chinese FA Super Cup ===
3 March 2013	Guangzhou Evergrande	1–2	Jiangsu Sainty	Guangzhou
15:30 UTC+8	Zhao Xuri (yellow card) 65'; Conca 72' (pen.)		Zhang Linpeng 18' (o.g.); Krivets 27'; Zhou Yun (yellow card) 36'; Salihi (yellow card) 50'; Sun Ke (yellow card) 64'; Ai Zhibo (yellow card) 71'; Liu Jianye (yellow card) 77'; Guan Zhen (yellow card) 84'	Stadium: Tianhe Stadium; Attendance: 14,817; Referee: Tan Hai; Assistant referees: Huo Weiming, Liu Guiqing; Fourth official: Yao Qing

=== AFC Champions League ===
==== Group stage ====
Pos	Team	Pld	W	D	L	GF	GA	GD	Pts	Qualification
1	(China) Guangzhou Evergrande	6	3	2	1	14	5	+9	11	Advance to knockout stage
2	(South Korea) Jeonbuk Hyundai Motors	6	2	4	0	10	6	+4	10	Advance to knockout stage
3	(Japan) Urawa Red Diamonds	6	3	1	2	11	11	0	10	
4	(Thailand) Muangthong United	6	0	1	5	4	17	−13	1	

26 February 2013 Group F	Guangzhou Evergrande (China)	3–0	(Japan) Urawa Red Diamonds	Guangzhou, China PR
20:00 UTC+8	Zhang Linpeng (yellow card) 5'; Barrios 16'; Qin Sheng (yellow card) 25'; Muriqui 65'; Huang Bowen (yellow card) 80'; Suzuki 90+1' (o.g.)	Summary; Report	Ugajin (yellow card) 80'	Stadium: Tianhe Stadium; Attendance: 39,876; Referee: Banjar Al-Dosari (Qatar); Assistant referees: Taleb Al-Marri (Qatar), Yaser Marad (Kuwait); Fourth official: Yousef Almarzouq (Kuwait)

12 March 2013 Group F	Jeonbuk Hyundai Motors (South Korea)	1–1	(China) Guangzhou Evergrande	Jeonju, South Korea
19:00 UTC+9	Kim Jung-Woo 28'; Park Hee-Do (yellow card) 56'; Jeong Hyuk (yellow card) 83'	Summary; Report	Huang Bowen (yellow card) 44'; Muriqui 64'	Stadium: Jeonju World Cup Stadium; Attendance: 10,949; Referee: Nawaf Shukralla (Bahrain); Assistant referees: Yaser Tulefat (Bahrain), Ebrahim Saleh (Bahrain); Fourth official: Thong Chanketya (Cambodia)

3 April 2013 Group F	Guangzhou Evergrande (China)	4–0	(Thailand) Muangthong United	Guangzhou, China PR
20:00 UTC+8	Conca 51'; Muriqui 58'; Gao Lin 84'; Conca 90+2' (pen.)	Summary; Report	Kim Yoo-Jin (yellow card) 28'; Panupong (yellow card) 89'; Teerasil (yellow card) 90+1'; Pichitphong (yellow card) 90+3'	Stadium: Tianhe Stadium; Attendance: 39,841; Referee: Abdullah Al Hilali (Oman); Assistant referees: Saif Talib Saif Al Ghafri (Oman), Abu Bakar Al-Amri (Oman); Fourth official: Mohd Amirul Izwan Bin Yaacob (Malaysia)

9 April 2013 Group F	Muangthong United (Thailand)	1–4	(China) Guangzhou Evergrande	Nonthaburi, Thailand
19:00 UTC+7	Artit (yellow card) 48'; Gjurovski (yellow card) 49'; Sarawut 53'	Summary; Report	Muriqui 40'; Muriqui 43'; Zheng Zhi 56'; Feng Xiaoting 86'	Stadium: SCG Stadium; Attendance: 10,207; Referee: Andre El Haddad (Lebanon); Assistant referees: Birak Ziad (Lebanon), Hadi El Kassar (Lebanon); Fourth official: Ng Chiu Kok (Hong Kong)

24 April 2013 Group F	Urawa Red Diamonds (Japan)	3–2	(China) Guangzhou Evergrande	Saitama, Japan
19:30 UTC+9	Abe (penalty missed) 24' (pen.); Koroki 52'; Abe 63'; Richardes 67' (pen.); Moriwaki (yellow card) 77'; Suzuki (yellow card) 89'; Yamada (yellow card) 90+4'	Summary; Report	Barrios 37'; Zhao Xuri (yellow card) 61'; Zheng Zhi (yellow card) 65'; Muriqui 87'; Zhang Linpeng (red card) 90+4'	Stadium: Saitama Stadium 2002; Attendance: 19,687; Referee: Mohsen Torky (Iran); Assistant referees: Mohammadreza Abolfazli (Iran), Mohammad Reza Mansouri (Iran); Fourth official: Chris Beath (Australia)

1 May 2013 Group F	Guangzhou Evergrande (China)	0–0	(South Korea) Jeonbuk Hyundai Motors	Guangzhou, China PR
20:00 UTC+8	Feng Xiaoting (yellow card) 17'; Rong Hao (yellow card) 25'; Qin Sheng (yellow card) 42'; Muriqui (yellow card) 62'	Summary; Report	Jeon Kwang-Hwan (yellow card) 14'; Kwon Kyung-Won (yellow card) 29'	Stadium: Tianhe Stadium; Attendance: 40,000; Referee: Khalil Al Ghamdi (Saudi Arabia); Assistant referees: Badr Ali A Alshumrani (Saudi Arabia), Hamed Sulaiman Al Mayahi (Oman); Fourth official: Win Cho (Myanmar)

==== Knockout stage ====
===== Round of 16 =====
15 May 2013 1st leg	Central Coast Mariners (Australia)	1–2	(China) Guangzhou Evergrande	Gosford, Australia
19:30 UTC+10	Duke 7'; Zwaanswijk (yellow card) 19'	Summary; Report	Barrios 28'; Muriqui 76'; Huang Bowen (yellow card) 84'	Stadium: Central Coast Stadium; Attendance: 8,953; Referee: Abdul Malik Abdul Bashir (Singapore); Assistant referees: Tang Yew Mun (Singapore), Jeffrey Goh (Singapore); Fourth official: Sukhbir Singh (Singapore)

22 May 2013 2nd leg	Guangzhou Evergrande (China)	3–0 (5–1 agg.)	(Australia) Central Coast Mariners	Guangzhou, China PR
20:00 UTC+8	Muriqui 7'; Sun Xiang (yellow card) 37'; Conca 45+1' (pen.); Gao Lin 68'; Zheng Zhi (yellow card) 90+3'	Summary; Report	Hutchinson (yellow card) 40'; McBreen (yellow card) 86'	Stadium: Tianhe Stadium; Attendance: 39,564; Referee: Abdulrahman Abdou (Qatar); Assistant referees: Taleb Salem H A Al-Marri (Qatar), Yaser Marad (Kuwait); Fourth official: Fahad Jaber Al-Marri (Qatar)

===== Quarter-finals =====
21 August 2013 1st leg	Guangzhou Evergrande (China)	2–0	(Qatar) Lekhwiya	Guangzhou, China PR
20:00 UTC+8	Conca 73' (pen.); Elkeson 76'	Summary; Report	Traoré (yellow card) 15'; Bougherra (yellow card) 48'; Dia (yellow card) 71'; Lami (yellow card) 83'	Stadium: Tianhe Stadium; Attendance: 52,384; Referee: Kim Dong-Jin (South Korea); Assistant referees: Jeong Hae-Sang (South Korea), Yang Byoung-Eun (South Korea); Fourth official: Kim Dae-Yong (South Korea)

18 September 2013 2nd leg	Lekhwiya (Qatar)	1–4 (1–6 agg.)	(China) Guangzhou Evergrande	Doha, Qatar
18:15 UTC+3	Zhang Linpeng 51' (o.g.); Msakni (yellow card) 65'; Shehab (yellow card) 81'	Summary; Report	Conca 14'; Elkeson 16'; Muriqui 31'; Elkeson 77'	Stadium: Abdullah bin Khalifa Stadium; Attendance: 3,251; Referee: Mohamed Al Zarouni (United Arab Emirates); Assistant referees: Saleh Mohamed Al Marzouqi (United Arab Emirates), Mohamed Aljalaf (United Arab Emirates); Fourth official: Hamad Ahmed Abdulla Bin Alshaikh Alhashmi (United Arab Emirates)

===== Semi-finals =====
25 September 2013 1st leg	Kashiwa Reysol (Japan)	1–4	(China) Guangzhou Evergrande	Kashiwa, Japan
19:00 UTC+9	Jorge Wagner 10'; Jorge Wagner (yellow card) 75'; Kim Chang-Soo (yellow card) 90'	Summary; Report	Rong Hao (yellow card) 20'; Muriqui 58'; Conca 67'; Conca 82'; Zeng Cheng (yellow card) 87'; Muriqui 90+1'	Stadium: Hitachi Kashiwa Soccer Stadium; Attendance: 11,932; Referee: Valentin Kovalenko (Uzbekistan); Assistant referees: Rafael Ilyasov (Uzbekistan), Saidkasimov Mamur (Uzbekistan); Fourth official: Vladislav Tseytlin (Uzbekistan)

2 October 2013 2nd leg	Guangzhou Evergrande (China)	4–0 (8–1 agg.)	(Japan) Kashiwa Reysol	Guangzhou, China PR
20:00 UTC+8	Elkeson 16'; Conca 57'; Muriqui 79'; Muriqui 87'	Summary; Report	Hashimoto (yellow card) 35'; Kurisawa (yellow card) 59'	Stadium: Tianhe Stadium; Attendance: 41,000; Referee: Abdulrahman Abdou (Qatar); Assistant referees: Taleb Salem H A Al-Marri (Qatar), Ramzan Saeed M A Al-Naemi (Qatar); Fourth official: Fahad Jaber Al-Marri (Qatar)

===== Final =====
26 October 2013 1st leg	FC Seoul (South Korea)	2–2	(China) Guangzhou Evergrande	Seoul, South Korea
19:30 UTC+9	Escudero 11'; Escudero (yellow card) 70'; Damjanović 83'	Summary; Report	Elkeson 30'; Feng Xiaoting (yellow card) 38'; Gao Lin 58'	Stadium: Seoul World Cup Stadium; Attendance: 55,501; Referee: Ravshan Irmatov (Uzbekistan); Assistant referees: Abdukhamidullo Rasulov (Uzbekistan), Bakhadyr Kochkarov (Kyrgyzstan); Fourth official: Valentin Kovalenko (Uzbekistan)

9 November 2013 2nd leg	Guangzhou Evergrande (China)	1–1 (3 a – 3 agg.)	(South Korea) FC Seoul	Guangzhou, China PR
20:00 UTC+8	Zhang Linpeng (yellow card) 33'; Elkeson 58'; Zeng Cheng (yellow card) 90+3'	Summary; Report	Ha Dae-Sung (yellow card) 45+1'; Damjanović 63'; Kim Jin-Kyu (yellow card) 65'	Stadium: Tianhe Stadium; Attendance: 55,847; Referee: Nawaf Shukralla (Bahrain); Assistant referees: Yaser Khalil Ebrahim Abdulla Tulefat (Bahrain), Ebrahim Mubarak Sabt Moosa Saleh (Bahrain); Fourth official: Ali Abdulnabi (Bahrain)

=== FIFA Club World Cup ===
14 December 2013 Quarter-finals	Guangzhou Evergrande (China)	2–0	(Egypt) Al Ahly	Agadir, Morocco
16:00 UTC+0	Sun Xiang (yellow card) 45'; Elkeson 49'; Zhang Linpeng (yellow card) 55'; Conca 67'	Report		Stadium: Stade Adrar; Attendance: 34,579; Referee: Sandro Ricci (Brazil); Assistant referees: Emerson De Carvalho (Brazil), Marcelo Van Gasse (Brazil); Fourth official: Néant Alioum (Cameroon)

17 December 2013 Semi-finals	Guangzhou Evergrande (China)	0–3	(Germany) Bayern Munich	Agadir, Morocco
19:30 UTC+0	Zhao Xuri (yellow card) 68'	Report	Ribéry 40'; Mandžukić 44'; Götze 47'	Stadium: Stade Adrar; Attendance: 27,311; Referee: Bakary Gassama (Gambia); Assistant referees: Angesom Ogbamariam (Eritrea), Evarist Menkouande (Cameroon); Fourth official: Néant Alioum (Cameroon)

21 December 2013 Third place play-off	Guangzhou Evergrande (China)	2–3	(Brazil) Atlético Mineiro	Marrakesh, Morocco
16:30 UTC+0	Muriqui 9'; Conca 15' (pen.); Sun Xiang (yellow card) 33'	Report	Tardelli 2'; Cândido (yellow card) 14'; Ronaldinho 45+1'; Ronaldinho (red card) 87'; Réver (yellow card) 90'; Luan 90+1'	Stadium: Stade de Marrakech; Attendance: 37,774; Referee: Alireza Faghani (Iran); Assistant referees: Hassan Kamranifar (Iran), Reza Sokhandan (Iran); Fourth official: Néant Alioum (Cameroon)

== Statistics ==
As of 22 December 2013

=== Appearances and goals ===
No.	Pos.	Player	Super League			FA Cup			Champions League			Super Cup			FIFA Club World Cup			Total		
No.	Pos.	Player	Apps.	Starts	Goals	Apps.	Starts	Goals	Apps.	Starts	Goals	Apps.	Starts	Goals	Apps.	Starts	Goals	Apps.	Starts	Goals
2	MF	(China) Liao Lisheng	1	1	0	0	0	0	0	0	0	0	0	0	0	0	0	1	1	0
3	DF	(China) Yi Teng	4	2	0	2	2	0	0	0	0	0	0	0	0	0	0	6	4	0
4	DF	(China) Zhao Peng	12	8	0	3	2	1	4	0	0	0	0	0	0	0	0	19	10	1
5	DF	(China) Zhang Linpeng	23	23	4	4	4	1	13	13	0	1	1	0	3	3	0	44	44	5
6	DF	(China) Feng Xiaoting	25	23	0	4	4	0	13	12	1	1	1	0	3	3	0	46	43	1
7	MF	(China) Feng Junyan	16	7	1	5	2	2	3	0	0	0	0	0	2	0	0	26	9	3
8	MF	(China) Qin Sheng	14	7	0	3	1	0	7	2	0	0	0	0	0	0	0	24	10	0
9	MF	(Brazil) Elkeson	28	26	24	3	3	1	6	6	6	1	1	0	3	3	1	41	39	32
10	MF	(China) Zheng Zhi	24	23	2	4	4	0	14	14	1	1	1	0	3	3	0	46	45	3
11	FW	(Brazil) Muriqui	26	23	9	3	3	2	14	14	13	1	1	0	3	3	1	47	44	25
12	MF	(China) Zheng Long	7	2	2	1	1	0	1	0	0	0	0	0	0	0	0	9	3	2
14	MF	(China) Feng Renliang	10	3	0	0	0	0	1	0	0	1	0	0	0	0	0	12	3	0
15	MF	(Argentina) Darío Conca	26	25	14	4	4	3	14	14	8	1	1	1	3	3	2	48	47	28
16	MF	(China) Huang Bowen	25	22	4	4	3	1	12	7	0	1	1	0	3	3	0	45	36	5
18	FW	(Paraguay) Lucas Barrios	9	4	3	0	0	0	6	6	3	1	0	0	0	0	0	16	10	6
19	GK	(China) Zeng Cheng	27	27	0	4	4	0	14	14	0	1	1	0	2	2	0	48	48	0
20	FW	(China) Ni Bo	0	0	0	2	1	2	0	0	0	0	0	0	0	0	0	2	1	2
21	DF	(China) Huang Jiaqiang	2	1	0	2	0	0	0	0	0	0	0	0	0	0	0	4	1	0
22	GK	(China) Li Shuai	3	3	0	2	2	0	0	0	0	0	0	0	1	1	0	6	6	0
24	MF	(China) Shi Hongjun	1	0	0	2	2	0	1	0	0	0	0	0	0	0	0	4	2	0
25	MF	(China) Peng Xinli	1	0	0	1	1	2	0	0	0	0	0	0	0	0	0	2	1	2
28	DF	(South Korea) Kim Young-Gwon	26	26	2	4	4	0	14	14	0	1	1	0	3	3	0	48	48	2
29	FW	(China) Gao Lin	28	20	8	5	4	1	13	9	3	1	1	0	3	2	0	50	36	12
30	FW	(China) Yang Chaosheng	4	2	0	4	3	1	0	0	0	0	0	0	0	0	0	8	5	1
31	DF	(China) Zhang Hongnan	2	2	0	1	1	0	0	0	0	0	0	0	0	0	0	3	3	0
32	DF	(China) Sun Xiang	23	21	1	4	4	0	14	14	0	1	1	0	3	3	0	45	43	1
33	DF	(China) Rong Hao	25	17	2	3	3	0	12	6	0	0	0	0	3	0	0	43	26	2
34	FW	(China) Hu Weiwei	2	0	0	2	0	0	0	0	0	0	0	0	0	0	0	4	0	0
35	FW	(China) Shewket Yalqun	1	0	0	2	1	1	0	0	0	0	0	0	0	0	0	3	1	1
37	MF	(China) Zhao Xuri	22	12	2	5	3	0	13	9	0	1	0	0	3	1	0	44	25	2
Own Goals											1									1
TOTALS					78			18			36			1			4			137

=== Goalscorers ===
Rank	Player	No.	Pos.	Super League	FA Cup	Champions League	Super Cup	FIFA Club World Cup	Total
1	(Brazil) Elkeson	9	MF	24	1	6	0	1	32
2	(Argentina) Dario Conca	15	MF	14	3	8	1	2	28
3	(Brazil) Muriqui	11	FW	9	2	13	0	1	25
4	(China) Gao Lin	29	FW	8	1	3	0	0	12
5	(Paraguay) Lucas Barrios	18	FW	3	0	3	0	0	6
6	(China) Zhang Linpeng	5	DF	4	1	0	0	0	5
6	(China) Huang Bowen	16	MF	4	1	0	0	0	5
8	(China) Feng Junyan	7	MF	1	2	0	0	0	3
8	(China) Zheng Zhi	10	MF	2	0	1	0	0	3
10	(China) Zheng Long	12	MF	2	0	0	0	0	2
10	(China) Ni Bo	20	FW	0	2	0	0	0	2
10	(China) Peng Xinli	25	MF	0	2	0	0	0	2
10	(South Korea) Kim Young-Gwon	28	DF	2	0	0	0	0	2
10	(China) Rong Hao	33	DF	2	0	0	0	0	2
10	(China) Zhao Xuri	37	MF	2	0	0	0	0	2
16	(China) Zhao Peng	4	DF	0	1	0	0	0	1
16	(China) Feng Xiaoting	6	DF	0	0	1	0	0	1
16	(China) Yang Chaosheng	30	FW	0	1	0	0	0	1
16	(China) Sun Xiang	32	DF	1	0	0	0	0	1
16	(China) Shewket Yalqun	35	FW	0	1	0	0	0	1
Own goals				0	0	1	0	0	1
TOTALS				78	18	36	1	4	137

=== Clean sheets ===
No.	Pos.	Player	Super League	FA Cup	Champions League	Super Cup	FIFA Club World Cup	Total
19	GK	(China) Zeng Cheng	13	1	6	0	1	21
22	GK	(China) Li Shuai	1	0	0	0	0	1
TOTALS			14	1	6	0	1	22

=== Disciplinary record ===
No.	Pos.	Player	Super League			FA Cup			Champions League			Super Cup			FIFA Club World Cup			Total		
No.	Pos.	Player	Yellow card	(yellow card) (yellow-red card)	Red card	Yellow card	(yellow card) (yellow-red card)	Red card	Yellow card	(yellow card) (yellow-red card)	Red card	Yellow card	(yellow card) (yellow-red card)	Red card	Yellow card	(yellow card) (yellow-red card)	Red card	Yellow card	(yellow card) (yellow-red card)	Red card
3	DF	(China) Yi Teng	1	0	0	0	0	0	0	0	0	0	0	0	0	0	0	1	0	0
4	DF	(China) Zhao Peng	1	0	0	0	0	0	0	0	0	0	0	0	0	0	0	1	0	0
5	DF	(China) Zhang Linpeng	5	0	0	1	0	0	2	0	1	0	0	0	1	0	0	9	0	1
6	DF	(China) Feng Xiaoting	2	0	0	0	0	0	2	0	0	0	0	0	0	0	0	4	0	0
7	MF	(China) Feng Junyan	2	0	0	0	0	0	0	0	0	0	0	0	0	0	0	2	0	0
8	MF	(China) Qin Sheng	3	0	0	1	0	0	2	0	0	0	0	0	0	0	0	6	0	0
9	MF	(Brazil) Elkeson	0	0	1	0	0	1	0	0	0	0	0	0	0	0	0	0	0	2
10	MF	(China) Zheng Zhi	6	0	0	1	0	0	2	0	0	0	0	0	0	0	0	9	0	0
11	FW	(Brazil) Muriqui	4	0	0	2	0	0	1	0	0	0	0	0	0	0	0	7	0	0
12	MF	(China) Zheng Long	1	0	0	0	0	0	0	0	0	0	0	0	0	0	0	1	0	0
15	MF	(Argentina) Dario Conca	2	0	0	0	0	0	0	0	0	0	0	0	0	0	0	2	0	0
16	MF	(China) Huang Bowen	0	0	0	0	0	0	3	0	0	0	0	0	0	0	0	3	0	0
19	GK	(China) Zeng Cheng	2	0	0	1	0	0	2	0	0	0	0	0	0	0	0	5	0	0
21	DF	(China) Huang Jiaqiang	1	0	0	0	0	0	0	0	0	0	0	0	0	0	0	1	0	0
24	MF	(China) Shi Hongjun	1	0	0	0	0	0	0	0	0	0	0	0	0	0	0	1	0	0
28	DF	(South Korea) Kim Young-Gwon	1	0	0	0	0	0	0	0	0	0	0	0	0	0	0	1	0	0
29	FW	(China) Gao Lin	1	0	0	1	0	0	0	0	0	0	0	0	0	0	0	2	0	0
32	DF	(China) Sun Xiang	5	0	0	2	0	0	1	0	0	0	0	0	2	0	0	10	0	0
33	DF	(China) Rong Hao	1	0	0	1	0	0	2	0	0	0	0	0	0	0	0	4	0	0
37	MF	(China) Zhao Xuri	2	0	1	2	0	0	1	0	0	1	0	0	1	0	0	7	0	1
TOTALS			41	0	2	12	0	1	18	0	1	1	0	0	4	0	0	76	0	4

=== Overview ===
	Overall	Super League	FA Cup	Champions League	Super Cup	FIFA Club World Cup
Games played	54	30	6	14	1	3
Games won	38	24	4	9	0	1
Games drawn	10	5	1	4	0	0
Games lost	6	1	1	1	1	2
Winning rate	70.37%	80%	66.67%	64.29%	0%	33.33%
Points won	–	77/90 (85.56%)	-			
Average Pts per game	–	2.57	-			
Goals scored	137	78	18	36	1	4
Goals conceded	46	18	9	11	2	6
Goal difference	+91	+60	+9	+25	−1	−2
Average GF per game	2.54	2.6	3	2.57	1	1.33
Average GA per game	0.85	0.6	1.5	0.79	2	2
Clean sheets	22	14	1	6	0	1
Yellow cards	76	41	12	18	1	4
Red cards	4	2	1	1	0	0
Worst discipline	(China) Zhang Linpeng (9 (yellow card) , 1 (red card) )					
Biggest win	7–1 vs Dali Travel Ruilong	6–1 vs Changchun Yatai; 5–0 vs Wuhan Zall	7–1 vs Dali Travel Ruilong	4–0 vs Muangthong United; 4–0 vs Kashiwa Reysol	None	2–0 vs Al Ahly
Biggest loss	0–3 vs Bayern Munich	0–1 vs Tianjin Teda	0–2 vs Guizhou Moutai	2–3 vs Urawa Red Diamonds	1–2 vs Jiangsu Sainty	0–3 vs Bayern Munich
Most Appearances	(China) Gao Lin (50 appearances)					
Most Goals	(Brazil) Elkeson (32 goals)					
