= 2012 CSL All-Stars Game =

Guangzhou Evergrande	All-Stars Team
0	1
- Date: 7 November 2012
- Venue: Tianhe Stadium, Guangzhou
- Referee: Tan Hai
- Weather: Partly cloudy skies

The 2012 CSL All-Stars Game was the 6th CSL All-Stars Game, an annual football match contested by the winners of the Super League and a team of the CSL top players from other clubs. The match was played at the Tianhe Stadium on 7 November 2012, and contested by league winner Guangzhou Evergrande and CSL All-Stars Team. All-Stars Team won the match 1–0.

== 2012 CSL All-Star Team ==
=== Squad ===
The squad for All-Stars Game announced on 29 October 2012.

Note: Flags indicate national team as defined under FIFA eligibility rules; some limited exceptions apply. Players may hold more than one non-FIFA nationality.

No.	Pos.	Nation	Player
1	GK	CHN	Deng Xiaofei (from Jiangsu Sainty)
3	DF	CHN	Du Wei (from Shandong Luneng Taishan)
4	DF	CHN	Wu Xi (from Shanghai Shenhua)
5	DF	CHN	Zheng Zheng (from Shandong Luneng Taishan)
6	MF	CHN	Xu Liang (from Beijing Guoan)
7	MF	CHN	Lu Bofei (from Jiangsu Sainty)
8	MF	CHN	Liu Jianye (from Jiangsu Sainty)
9	FW	CHN	Gao Di ^{note 1} (from Shandong Luneng Taishan)
10	MF	MLI	Seydou Keita (from Dalian Aerbin)

No.	Pos.	Nation	Player
11	FW	NGA	Peter Utaka (from Dalian Aerbin)
12	MF	CHN	Lu Lin ^{note 2} (from Guangzhou R&F)
16	FW	CHN	Yu Dabao (from Dalian Aerbin)
17	FW	NGA	Yakubu (from Guangzhou R&F)
18	FW	CHN	Yang Xu (from Liaoning Whowin)
20	MF	CHN	Yu Hanchao (from Liaoning Whowin)
21	MF	CHN	Tang Miao (from Guangzhou R&F)
22	GK	CHN	Zeng Cheng (from Henan Jianye)
31	DF	AUS	Dino Djulbic (from Guizhou Renhe)

- note 1: Replaced Cristian Dănălache.
- note 2: Replaced Hao Junmin.

=== Coaching staff ===
Position	Staff
Head coach	(Serbia) Dragan Okuka (from Jiangsu Sainty)
Team Leader	(China) Yang Chen (from Jiangsu Sainty)
Assistant coach	(China) Gao Hongbo (from Guizhou Renhe)
Goalkeeping coach	(China) Ou Chuliang (from Henan Jianye)
Team physician	(China) Shuang Yin (from Beijing Guoan)

Source: QQ.com

== Match details ==
7 November 2012
18:35 CEST

Guangzhou Evergrande	0–1	All-Stars Team
	Report	45' Liu Jianye

Tianhe Stadium, Guangzhou
Referee: Tan Hai

Guangzhou Evergrande	All–Stars Team

Guangzhou:
GK	1	(China) Yang Jun	(substituted off) 75'
CB	3	(Brazil) Paulão	(substituted off) 62'
CB	13	(China) Tang Dechao
CB	19	(China) Li Jianbin
RWB	34	(China) Huang Jiaqiang	(substituted off) 46'
LWB	14	(China) Li Jianhua (c)
DM	8	(China) Qin Sheng	(substituted off) 46'
DM	37	(China) Zhao Xuri	(substituted off) 46'
AM	21	(China) Jiang Ning	(substituted off) 46'
SS	26	(China) Wu Pingfeng	(substituted off) 62'
ST	35	(China) Memet Ali
Substitutes:
GK	12	(China) Dong Chunyu	(substituted on) 75'
MF	16	(South Korea) Cho Won-Hee	(substituted on) 46'
FW	17	(China) Gao Zhilin	(substituted on) 62'
FW	20	(China) Ni Bo	(substituted on) 46'
MF	23	(China) Li Zhilang	(substituted on) 46'
MF	24	(China) Shi Hongjun	(substituted on) 62'
MF	39	(China) Tan Jiajun	(substituted on) 46'
Coach:
(Italy) Marcello Lippi

All-Stars:
GK	1	(China) Deng Xiaofei	(substituted off) 46'
RB	4	(China) Wu Xi	(substituted off) 46'
CB	3	(China) Du Wei (c)
CB	31	(Australia) Dino Djulbic	(substituted off) 46'
LB	5	(China) Zheng Zheng
CM	8	(China) Liu Jianye
CM	10	(Mali) Seydou Keita
RM	16	(China) Yu Dabao	(substituted off) 67'
LM	20	(China) Yu Hanchao	(substituted off) 60'
FW	11	(Nigeria) Peter Utaka	(substituted off) 83'
FW	17	(Nigeria) Yakubu	(substituted off) 46'
Substitutes:
MF	6	(China) Xu Liang	(substituted on) 46'
MF	7	(China) Lu Bofei	(substituted on) 83'
FW	9	(China) Gao Di	(substituted on) 67'
MF	12	(China) Lu Lin	(substituted on) 60'
FW	18	(China) Yang Xu	(substituted on) 46'
MF	21	(China) Tang Miao	(substituted on) 46'
GK	22	(China) Zeng Cheng	(substituted on) 46'
Coach:
(Serbia) Dragan Okuka

Assistant referees:
Su Jige
Mu Yuxin

Fourth official:
Fan Qi

Referees Assesor:
Chen Yongliang

Match Commissioner:
Xie Zhiguang

General Coordinator
Liu Dianqiu

CSL All-Stars Game
2012 Winners
All-Stars Team

== See also ==
- 2012 Chinese Super League
- 2012 Guangzhou Evergrande F.C. season
