= Elkeson =

Brazilian-born Chinese footballer (born 1989)

Elkeson Ai Kesen
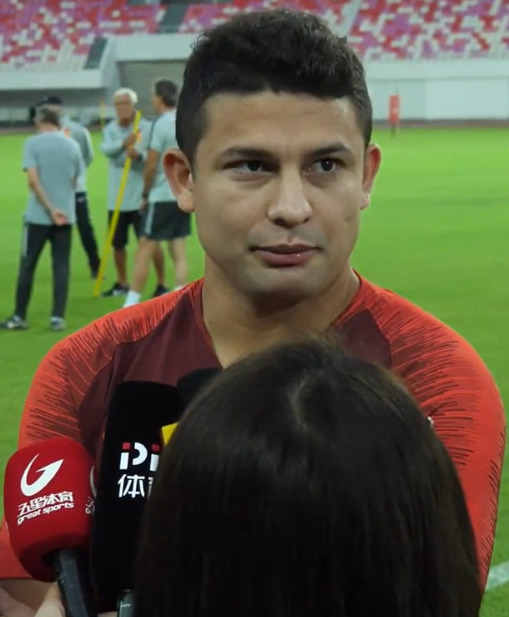
- Elkeson with China in 2019

Personal information
- Full name: Ai Kesen
- Birth name: Elkeson de Oliveira Cardoso
- Date of birth: 13 July 1989 (age 37)
- Place of birth: Coelho Neto, Maranhão, Brazil
- Height: 1.80 m (5 ft 11 in)
- Position: Striker

Youth career
- 2001–2009: Vitória

Senior career*
Years	Team	Apps	(Gls)
2009–2011	Vitória	47	(7)
2011–2012	Botafogo	65	(19)
2013–2015	Guangzhou Evergrande	72	(59)
2016–2019	Shanghai SIPG	74	(37)
2019–2021	Guangzhou FC	45	(27)
2022	Grêmio	23	(3)
2023–2024	Chengdu Rongcheng	34	(10)
Total		360	(162)

International career^{‡}
2019–2024	China	19	(4)
- * Club domestic league appearances and goals as of 2 September 2024 ‡ National team caps and goals as of 1 April 2024

Elkeson
- Chinese: 艾克森
Transcriptions
Standard Mandarin
- Hanyu Pinyin: Ài Kèsēn

Elkeson de Oliveira Cardoso (born 13 July 1989), simply Elkeson and spelled in Mandarin as Ai Kesen (Chinese: 艾克森; pinyin: Ài Kèsēn), is a former professional footballer who played as a striker. Born in Brazil, he played for the China national team.

Starting out at Vitória, he played mostly as an attacking midfielder and as a winger, but since his final days at Botafogo, he was moved to attack and has played as a striker. Born in Brazil, Elkeson obtained Chinese citizenship in 2019 through naturalization and represents China internationally.

== Club career ==
=== Brazil ===
Elkeson first played for Vitória's youth academy before signing with the first team in 2009. During the 2010 season, Elkeson proved himself a breakout success and soon earned himself a move to Botafogo in May 2011.

After two years of being one of Botafogo's star players in the Brasileirão, Guangzhou Evergrande of the Chinese Super League secured his services at the end of the 2012 season.

=== Guangzhou Evergrande ===
On 24 December 2012, Guangzhou Evergrande officially announced that they had signed Elkeson on a four-year deal for a fee of €5.7 million. He was not initially included in Guangzhou's 30-player squad for the 2013 AFC Champions League due to the limit on foreign players. On 3 March 2013, he made his debut for Guangzhou in the 2013 Chinese FA Super Cup which Guangzhou Evergrande lost to Jiangsu Sainty 2–1. On 8 March 2013, Elkeson scored his first two goals in China in the opening match of the 2013 Chinese Super League against Shanghai Shenxin, which ensured Guangzhou Evergrande's 5–1 victory. He scored thirteen goals in his first seven matches in the league. In July 2013, Elkeson was named in the squad which was submitted for the next stage of the AFC Champions League, replacing Lucas Barrios, who had decided to return to Europe.

He scored twenty-four goals in twenty-eight appearances in the Super League which made him the top goalscorer of the season, eight more than the second-placed Carmelo Valencia. He scored six goals in six matches in the AFC Champions League, including two goals across both legs of the 2013 AFC Champions League Final against FC Seoul as Guangzhou was crowned champion of the competition for the first time. The win in the final was the first time a Chinese club had won the trophy in 23 years.

On 1 December 2013, in the first leg of the 2013 Chinese FA Cup final against Guizhou Renhe, he was sent off after striking Yang Hao in the face with his hand. On 5 December, he received a ban of 4 matches and was fined ¥20,000 by the Chinese Football Association discipline committee.

Guangzhou Evergrande finally lost to Guizhou Renhe 3–2 on aggregate, failing to defend the FA Cup title. Elkeson played all three matches for Guangzhou Evergrande in the 2013 FIFA Club World Cup. On 14 December 2013, he scored Guangzhou's first goal in the FIFA Club World Cup against African champions Al Ahly in the quarter-finals, helping Guangzhou win the match 2–0.

In March 2015, after a match against Changchun Yatai, he was heavily criticised for annulling teammate Gao Lin's certain bicycle kick goal by attempting to poach the goal for himself by just brushing the ball on the line with his head, which meant ultimately that the goal was (correctly) ruled offside and the team only drew the match 1–1.

Elkeson scored the winner as Guangzhou beat Al-Ahli of the UAE to win a second AFC Champions League in three years on 21 November 2015.

=== Shanghai SIPG ===
On 21 January 2016, Elkeson moved to fellow Super League side Shanghai SIPG with a fee of ¥132 million (€18.5 million).

On 4 April 2018, Elkeson scored his side's only goal in their 1–1 draw with Kawasaki Frontale in the group stage of the AFC Champions League. The goal was Elkeson's 27th in the competition proper, moving him to fourth all time in the top scoring charts.

On 18 September 2018, Elkeson scored the winning goal for Shanghai SIPG, as the club recorded its first ever win in the Super League against his former club Guangzhou Evergrande. The win cemented SIPG's position in first place at the top of the league table. On 7 October, Elkeson scored again as SIPG recorded a 5–0 win over bottom-of-the-table Guizhou Hengfeng to extend their lead over his former club at the top of the table to 4 points with just over a month of the season left. On 7 November, Elkeson played a part in Shanghai's 2–0 win over Beijing Renhe in the penultimate round of fixtures. The win secured Shanghai SIPG's first Chinese Super League title and ended Guangzhou Evergrande's seven-year title reign.

=== Return to Guangzhou Evergrande ===
On 9 July 2019, Elkeson returned to his former club Guangzhou Evergrande. Elkeson reportedly agreed a €10 million (US$11.2 million) annual salary to return, up from €6 million in Shanghai. At the time of his transfer, the two clubs were level on points, and were two points behind leaders Beijing Guoan. Elkeson marked his return to Guangzhou with goals in his first two games, and a hat-trick against local rivals Guangzhou R&F in his third match on 20 July.

On 13 December 2021, Elkeson confirmed his departure from Guangzhou FC, having terminated his contract with the club by mutual consent.

=== Return to Brazil ===
On 12 April 2022, Elkeson officially joined Série B side Grêmio, signing a contract until the end of the year and returning to Brazil after ten years abroad. Having scored four goals in 23 matches, he helped O Tricolor gain automatic promotion back to the Brazilian top tier at the end of the 2022 season. On 9 November, he announced his official departure from the club.

=== Chengdu Rongcheng ===
On 7 April 2023, Elkeson returned to China and signed with Chinese Super League side Chengdu Rongcheng. On 21 April 2023, he scored his first goal for Rongcheng in a 2–1 home win against Cangzhou Mighty Lions.

== International career ==
Elkeson during his first training for the national team as a Chinese player

In September 2011, Elkeson received his first call up for the Brazil national football team by Mano Menezes for the second leg of the 2011 Superclásico de las Américas against Argentina. However, he did not make an appearance once.

Elkeson was called up to the Chinese national team in August 2019, following the gaining of Chinese citizenship via naturalisation. Elkeson subsequently became the first player to be called up for China without any Chinese ancestry.

Following his naturalisation as a Chinese citizen, his name was rendered as Ai Kesen in Chinese (Chinese: 艾克森; pinyin: Ài Kèsēn).

On 10 September 2019, Elkeson made his international debut and scored his first 2 goals for China in a 5–0 away win against Maldives in the opening game of the second round of 2022 FIFA World Cup qualification.

== Career statistics ==
=== Club ===
Appearances and goals by club, season and competition
Club	Season	League			National cup (Note: Includes Copa do Brasil, Chinese FA Cup)		State league (Note: Includes Campeonato Baiano, Campeonato Carioca)		Continental		Other		Total	
Club	Season	Division	Apps	Goals	Apps	Goals	Apps	Goals	Apps	Goals	Apps	Goals	Apps	Goals
Vitória	2009	Série A	12	1	—		1	0	1 (Note: Appearances in Copa Sudamericana)	1	—		14	2
Vitória	2010	Série A	34	6	10	1	13	2	2	0	4 (Note: Appearances in Copa do Nordeste)	0	63	9
Vitória	2011	Série B	1	0	2	0	18	7	0	0	—		21	7
Vitória	Total		47	7	12	1	32	9	3	1	4	0	98	18
Botafogo	2011	Série A	34	8	—		—		3	0	—		37	8
Botafogo	2012	Série A	31	11	5	2	16	5	2	0	—		54	18
Botafogo	Total		65	19	5	2	16	5	5	0	—		91	26
Guangzhou Evergrande	2013	Chinese Super League	28	24	3	1	—		6 (Note: Appearances in AFC Champions League)	6	4 (Note: One appearance in Chinese FA Super Cup, three appearances and one goal in FIFA Club World Cup)	1	41	32
Guangzhou Evergrande	2014	Chinese Super League	28	28	1	0	—		10	6	—		39	34
Guangzhou Evergrande	2015	Chinese Super League	16	7	—		—		11	3	4 (Note: One appearance in Chinese FA Super Cup, three appearances in FIFA Club World Cup)	0	31	10
Guangzhou Evergrande	Total		72	59	4	1	—		27	15	8	1	111	76
Shanghai SIPG	2016	Chinese Super League	26	11	1	0	—		9	4	0	0	36	15
Shanghai SIPG	2017	Chinese Super League	17	11	1	2	—		12	5	0	0	30	18
Shanghai SIPG	2018	Chinese Super League	16	7	2	0	—		8	4	0	0	26	11
Shanghai SIPG	2019	Chinese Super League	15	8	1	0	—		8	2	1 (Note: Appearance in Chinese FA Super Cup)	0	25	10
Shanghai SIPG	Total		74	37	5	2	—		37	15	1	0	117	54
Guangzhou Evergrande	2019	Chinese Super League	13	10	0	0	—		4	0	0	0	17	10
Guangzhou Evergrande	2020	Chinese Super League	19	6	0	0	—		4	1	—		23	7
Guangzhou Evergrande	2021	Chinese Super League	13	11	0	0	—		0	0	—		13	11
Guangzhou Evergrande	Total		45	27	0	0	—		8	1	0	0	40	17
Grêmio	2022	Série B	23	3	—		—		—		—		23	3
Chengdu Rongcheng	2023	Chinese Super League	27	8	—		—		—		—		27	8
Chengdu Rongcheng	2024	Chinese Super League	7	2	1	0	—		0	0	—		8	2
Chengdu Rongcheng	Total		34	10	1	0	0	0	0	0	—		35	10
Career total			358	161	27	6	48	14	80	32	13	1	524	214

=== International ===
Appearances and goals by national team and year
National team	Year	Apps	Goals
China
China	2019	4	3
China	2021	9	1
China	2023	5	0
China	2024	1	0
Total		19	4

Scores and results list China's goal tally first, score column indicates score after each Elkeson goal.

International goals by date, venue, cap, opponent, score, result and competition
No.	Date	Venue	Cap	Opponent	Score	Result	Competition
1	10 September 2019	National Football Stadium, Malé, Maldives	1	Maldives	4–0	5–0	2022 FIFA World Cup qualification
2	10 September 2019	National Football Stadium, Malé, Maldives	1	Maldives	5–0	5–0	2022 FIFA World Cup qualification
3	10 October 2019	Tianhe Stadium, Guangzhou, Guangdong, China	2	Guam	7–0	7–0	2022 FIFA World Cup qualification
4	30 May 2021	Suzhou Olympic Sports Centre, Suzhou, Jiangsu, China	5	Guam	5–0	7–0	2022 FIFA World Cup qualification

== Honours ==
Vitória

- Campeonato Baiano: 2009, 2010
- Copa do Nordeste: 2010

Botafogo

- Taça Rio: 2012

Guangzhou Evergrande

- Chinese Super League: 2013, 2014, 2015, 2019
- AFC Champions League: 2013, 2015

Shanghai SIPG

- Chinese Super League: 2018
- Chinese FA Super Cup: 2019

Grêmio

- Recopa Gaúcha: 2022

Brazil

- Superclásico de las Américas : 2011

Individual

- AFC Champions League Dream Team: 2013, 2014
- Chinese Football Association Footballer of the Year: 2014
- Chinese Super League Golden Boot: 2013, 2014
- Chinese Super League Team of the Year: 2013, 2014

== See also ==
- List of Chinese naturalized footballers
