= 2010 East Asian Football Championship Final squads =

Below are the squads for the 2010 East Asian Football Championship tournament in Japan. There were 23 players in each squad, including 3 goalkeepers.

== China ==
Head coach: (China) Gao Hongbo

No.	Pos.	Player	Date of birth (age)	Caps	Goals	Club
1	GK	Zeng Cheng	8 January 1987 (aged 23)	3	0	(Chinese Football Association) Henan Construction
2	DF	Du Wei (captain)	9 February 1982 (aged 27)	44	3	(Chinese Football Association) Shanghai Shenhua
3	DF	Sun Xiang	15 January 1982 (aged 28)	50	4	(Chinese Football Association) Shanghai Shenhua
4	DF	Feng Xiaoting	22 October 1985 (aged 24)	14	0	(Korea Football Association) Jeonbuk Hyundai Motors
5	DF	Zhao Peng	20 June 1983 (aged 26)	12	1	(Chinese Football Association) Henan Construction
6	MF	Huang Bowen	24 March 1987 (aged 22)	13	1	(Chinese Football Association) Beijing Guoan
8	MF	Deng Zhuoxiang	24 October 1988 (aged 21)	7	0	(Chinese Football Association) Jiangsu Sainty
11	FW	Qu Bo	15 July 1981 (aged 28)	55	14	(Chinese Football Association) Qingdao Jonoon
12	GK	Guan Zhen	6 February 1985 (aged 25)	1	0	(Chinese Football Association) Jiangsu Sainty
15	MF	Yang Hao	19 August 1983 (aged 26)	11	2	(Chinese Football Association) Beijing Guoan
17	FW	Gao Lin	14 February 1986 (aged 23)	31	6	(Chinese Football Association) Shanghai Shenhua
19	FW	Jiang Ning	1 September 1986 (aged 23)	21	2	(Chinese Football Association) Qingdao Jonoon
20	DF	Rong Hao	7 April 1984 (aged 25)	13	0	(Chinese Football Association) Jiangsu Sainty
21	MF	Yu Hai	4 June 1987 (aged 22)	9	3	(Chinese Football Association) Shaanxi Neo-China
22	GK	Yang Zhi	6 June 1983 (aged 26)	12	0	(Chinese Football Association) Beijing Guoan
25	DF	Liu Jianye	17 June 1987 (aged 22)	6	0	(Chinese Football Association) Changsha Ginde
31	DF	Wang Qiang	23 July 1984 (aged 25)	4	0	(Chinese Football Association) Changsha Ginde
32	FW	Yang Xu	12 February 1987 (aged 22)	2	1	(Chinese Football Association) Liaoning FC
39	MF	Zhao Xuri	3 December 1985 (aged 24)	33	1	(Chinese Football Association) Dalian Shide
42	MF	Yan Feng	7 February 1982 (aged 27)	2	0	(Chinese Football Association) Changchun Yatai
45	DF	Zhang Linpeng	9 May 1989 (aged 20)	3	2	(Chinese Football Association) Shanghai East Asia
58	DF	He Yang	23 February 1983 (aged 26)	1	0	(Chinese Football Association) Tianjin Teda
93	MF	Wu Lei	19 November 1991 (aged 18)	0	0	(Chinese Football Association) Shanghai East Asia

== Hong Kong ==
Coach: (South Korea) Kim Pan-gon

No.	Pos.	Player	Date of birth (age)	Caps	Goals	Club
1	GK	Yapp Hung Fai	21 March 1990 (aged 19)	0	0	(Football Association of Hong Kong, China) TSW Pegasus
2	DF	Lee Chi Ho	16 November 1982 (aged 27)	22	0	(Football Association of Hong Kong, China) South China
3	DF	Gerard Ambassa Guy	21 September 1978 (aged 31)	24	6	(Football Association of Hong Kong, China) South China
4	DF	Ng Wai Chiu	22 October 1981 (aged 28)	14	2	(Chinese Football Association) Hangzhou Greentown
5	DF	Lee Wai Lun	7 March 1981 (aged 28)	22	0	(Football Association of Hong Kong, China) South China
6	DF	Wong Chin Hung	2 March 1982 (aged 27)	4	1	(Football Association of Hong Kong, China) South China
7	FW	Chan Siu Ki	14 July 1985 (aged 24)	33	26	(Football Association of Hong Kong, China) South China
8	MF	Xu Deshuai	13 July 1987 (aged 22)	4	0	(Football Association of Hong Kong, China) Citizen
9	FW	Lee Wai Lim	5 May 1981 (aged 28)	8	4	(Football Association of Hong Kong, China) South China
10	MF	Au Yeung Yiu Chung	11 July 1989 (aged 20)	5	2	(Football Association of Hong Kong, China) South China
11	MF	Li Haiqiang	13 May 1977 (aged 32)	4	0	(Football Association of Hong Kong, China) South China
14	FW	Leung Tsz Chun	19 May 1985 (aged 24)	1	0	(Football Association of Hong Kong, China) TSW Pegasus
15	DF	Chan Wai Ho	24 April 1982 (aged 27)	33	3	(Football Association of Hong Kong, China) South China
16	MF	Leung Chun Pong	1 October 1986 (aged 23)	18	1	(Football Association of Hong Kong, China) South China
17	GK	Ho Kwok Chuen	20 February 1977 (aged 32)	3	0	(Football Association of Hong Kong, China) South China
18	MF	Kwok Kin Pong	30 March 1987 (aged 22)	4	0	(Football Association of Hong Kong, China) South China
19	FW	Cheng Lai Hin	31 March 1986 (aged 23)	1	0	(Football Association of Hong Kong, China) Kitchee
20	DF	Poon Yiu Cheuk (captain)	19 September 1977 (aged 32)	58	4	(Football Association of Hong Kong, China) South China
21	MF	Man Pei Tak	16 February 1982 (aged 27)	36	1	(Football Association of Hong Kong, China) South China
25	MF	Bai He	19 November 1983 (aged 26)	5	0	(Football Association of Hong Kong, China) South China
26	FW	Chao Pengfei	11 July 1987 (aged 22)	7	3	(Football Association of Hong Kong, China) South China
28	GK	Zhang Chunhui	13 March 1983 (aged 26)	6	0	(Football Association of Hong Kong, China) South China
29	MF	Lee Hong Lim	29 September 1983 (aged 26)	2	0	(Football Association of Hong Kong, China) TSW Pegasus

== Japan ==
Manager: (Japan) Takeshi Okada

No.	Pos.	Player	Date of birth (age)	Caps	Goals	Club
1	GK	Seigo Narazaki	15 April 1976 (aged 33)	70	0	(Japan Football Association) Nagoya Grampus
2	MF	Yuki Abe	6 September 1981 (aged 28)	41	3	(Japan Football Association) Urawa Red Diamonds
3	DF	Yūichi Komano	25 July 1981 (aged 28)	50	0	(Japan Football Association) Júbilo Iwata
4	DF	Marcus Tulio Tanaka	24 April 1981 (aged 28)	33	6	(Japan Football Association) Nagoya Grampus
5	DF	Yuto Nagatomo	12 September 1986 (aged 23)	19	3	(Japan Football Association) FC Tokyo
6	DF	Atsuto Uchida	27 March 1988 (aged 21)	27	1	(Japan Football Association) Kashima Antlers
7	MF	Yasuhito Endō	28 January 1980 (aged 30)	86	7	(Japan Football Association) Gamba Osaka
8	MF	Junichi Inamoto	18 September 1979 (aged 30)	75	5	(Japan Football Association) Kawasaki Frontale
9	FW	Shinji Okazaki	16 April 1986 (aged 23)	21	15	(Japan Football Association) Shimizu S-Pulse
11	FW	Keiji Tamada	11 April 1980 (aged 29)	63	14	(Japan Football Association) Nagoya Grampus
12	DF	Daiki Iwamasa	30 January 1982 (aged 28)	1	0	(Japan Football Association) Kashima Antlers
13	FW	Hisato Satō	12 March 1982 (aged 27)	29	4	(Japan Football Association) Sanfrecce Hiroshima
14	MF	Kengo Nakamura	31 October 1980 (aged 29)	42	5	(Japan Football Association) Kawasaki Frontale
15	DF	Yasuyuki Konno	25 January 1983 (aged 27)	33	0	(Japan Football Association) FC Tokyo
16	MF	Yoshito Okubo	9 June 1982 (aged 27)	43	5	(Japan Football Association) Vissel Kobe
17	MF	Shinji Kagawa	17 March 1989 (aged 20)	11	2	(Japan Football Association) Cerezo Osaka
18	GK	Eiji Kawashima	20 March 1983 (aged 26)	8	0	(Japan Football Association) Kawasaki Frontale
20	FW	Sōta Hirayama	6 June 1985 (aged 24)	2	3	(Japan Football Association) FC Tokyo
21	DF	Yuhei Tokunaga	25 September 1983 (aged 26)	6	0	(Japan Football Association) FC Tokyo
22	DF	Yuji Nakazawa (captain)	25 February 1978 (aged 31)	97	17	(Japan Football Association) Yokohama F. Marinos
23	GK	Shusaku Nishikawa	18 June 1986 (aged 23)	1	0	(Japan Football Association) Sanfrecce Hiroshima
25	MF	Mitsuo Ogasawara	5 April 1979 (aged 30)	54	7	(Japan Football Association) Kashima Antlers
26	MF	Mu Kanazaki	16 February 1989 (aged 20)	3	0	(Japan Football Association) Nagoya Grampus

== South Korea ==
Manager: (South Korea) Huh Jung-moo

No.	Pos.	Player	Date of birth (age)	Caps	Goals	Club
1	GK	Lee Woon-jae	26 April 1973 (aged 36)	125	0	(Korea Football Association) Suwon Samsung Bluewings
2	DF	Oh Beom-seok	29 July 1984 (aged 25)	32	2	(Korea Football Association) Ulsan Hyundai
3	DF	Kang Min-soo	14 February 1986 (aged 23)	30	0	(Korea Football Association) Suwon Samsung Bluewings
4	DF	Cho Yong-hyung	3 November 1983 (aged 26)	25	0	(Korea Football Association) Jeju United
5	DF	Kwak Tae-hwi	8 July 1981 (aged 28)	8	3	(Japan Football Association) Kyoto Sanga
6	MF	Koo Ja-cheol	27 February 1989 (aged 20)	5	1	(Korea Football Association) Jeju United
7	MF	Kim Jae-sung	3 October 1983 (aged 26)	2	1	(Korea Football Association) Pohang Steelers
8	MF	Kim Jung-woo (captain)	9 May 1982 (aged 27)	50	3	(Korea Football Association) Gwangju Sangmu
9	FW	Lee Seung-yeoul	6 March 1989 (aged 20)	2	0	(Korea Football Association) FC Seoul
10	MF	Kim Do-heon	14 July 1982 (aged 27)	57	11	(Korea Football Association) Suwon Samsung Bluewings
11	FW	Lee Keun-ho	11 April 1985 (aged 24)	27	8	(Japan Football Association) Jubilo Iwata
12	DF	Lee Kyu-ro	20 August 1988 (aged 21)	2	0	(Korea Football Association) Chunnam Dragons
13	DF	Park Joo-ho	16 January 1987 (aged 23)	2	0	(Japan Football Association) Jubilo Iwata
14	DF	Lee Jung-soo	8 January 1980 (aged 30)	19	2	(Japan Football Association) Kashima Antlers
15	MF	Kim Bo-kyung	6 October 1989 (aged 20)	2	0	(Japan Football Association) Oita Trinita
16	MF	Shin Hyung-min	18 July 1986 (aged 23)	2	0	(Korea Football Association) Pohang Steelers
17	MF	Lee Seung-hyun	25 July 1985 (aged 24)	3	0	(Korea Football Association) Busan I'Park
18	GK	Jung Sung-ryong	4 January 1985 (aged 25)	13	0	(Korea Football Association) Seongnam Ilhwa Chunma
19	MF	Oh Jang-eun	24 July 1985 (aged 24)	11	0	(Korea Football Association) Ulsan Hyundai
20	FW	Lee Dong-gook	29 April 1979 (aged 30)	78	22	(Korea Football Association) Jeonbuk Hyundai Motors
21	GK	Kim Young-kwang	28 June 1983 (aged 26)	14	0	(Korea Football Association) Ulsan Hyundai
22	FW	No Byung-jun	29 September 1979 (aged 30)	4	0	(Korea Football Association) Pohang Steelers
23	DF	Kim Hyung-il	27 April 1984 (aged 25)	2	0	(Korea Football Association) Pohang Steelers

== Player statistics ==
Player representation by club

Players	Clubs
17	(Hong Kong) South China
4	(Japan) F.C. Tokyo, (Japan) Nagoya Grampus, (Japan) Kashima Antlers, (South Korea) Pohang Steelers

Player representation by club league

Players	Percentage	Nations
29	31.5%	(Japan) J-League
22	23.9%	(Hong Kong) First Division
20	21.7%	(South Korea) K-League
20	21.7%	(China) Super League
3	3.3%	(China) Jia League

Average age of squads

Average age	Nations
24.0	China
25.9	Hong Kong
26.6	Japan
25.3	South Korea

Players with most international appearance

Caps	Player	Nation	Club
125	Lee Woon-Jae	South Korea	(South Korea) Suwon Bluewings
97	Yuji Nakazawa	Japan	(Japan) Yokohama F. Marinos
86	Yasuhito Endō	Japan	(Japan) Gamba Osaka

Players with most international goals

Goals	Player	Nation	Club
26	Chan Siu Ki	Hong Kong	(Hong Kong) South China
22	Lee Dong-Gook	South Korea	(South Korea) Jeonbuk Hyundai
17	Yuji Nakazawa	Japan	(Japan) Yokohama F. Marinos
