= Zhang Linpeng =

Chinese footballer (born 1989)

Zhang Linpeng 张琳芃
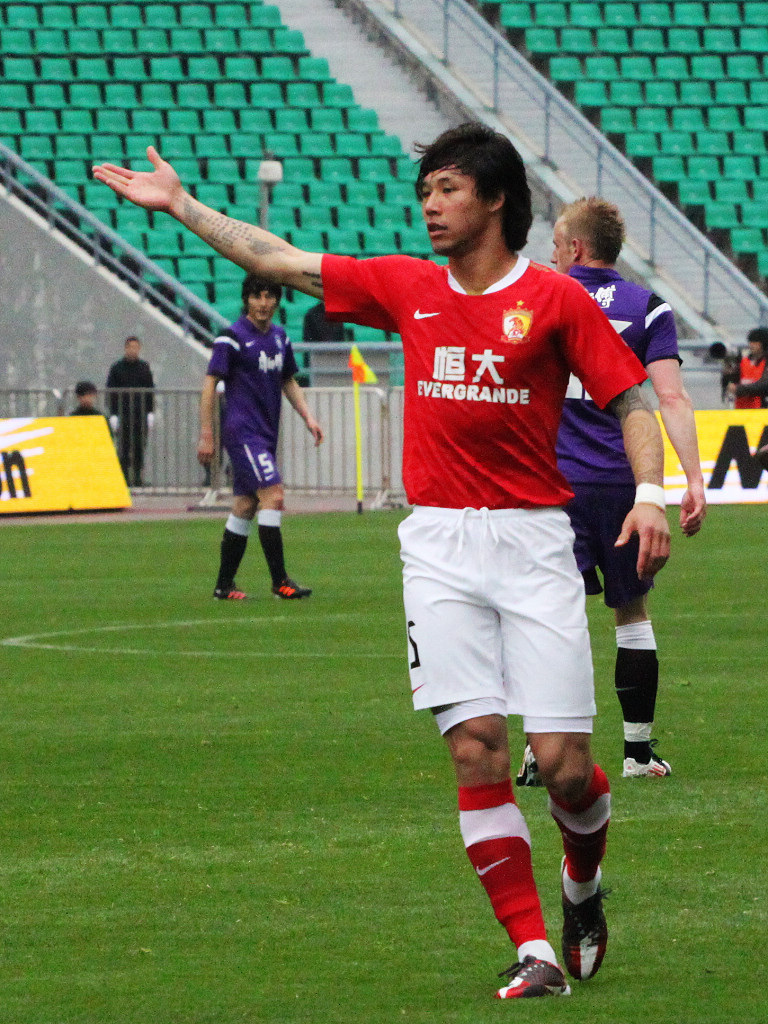
- Zhang playing for Guangzhou Eveergrade in 2012

Personal information
- Date of birth: 9 May 1989 (age 37)
- Place of birth: Jinan, Shandong, China
- Height: 1.85 m (6 ft 1 in)
- Position: Defender

Team information
- Current team: Shanghai Port
- Number: 5

Youth career
- 1996–1997: Jinan Zhengli
- 1997–1999: Qingdao Hainiu
- 1999–2000: Guangdong Mingfeng
- 2001–2005: Genbao Football Academy

Senior career*
Years	Team	Apps	(Gls)
2006–2010	Shanghai East Asia	65	(2)
2010–2021	Guangzhou FC	223	(15)
2022–	Shanghai Port	81	(3)

International career^{‡}
2008	China U19	6	(0)
2009–2010	China U23	9	(1)
2009–	China	105	(6)
Medal record
Representing China
Men's football
EAFF Championship
Gold medal – first place	2010 Japan	Team
Silver medal – second place	2013 South Korea	Team
- * Club domestic league appearances and goals as of 19 November 2026 ‡ National team caps and goals as of 21 March 2024

Zhang Linpeng
- Simplified Chinese: 张琳芃
- Traditional Chinese: 張琳芃
Transcriptions
Standard Mandarin
- Hanyu Pinyin: Zhāng Línpéng
- IPA: [ʈʂáŋ lǐm pʰə̌ŋ]

Zhang Linpeng (Chinese: 张琳芃; pinyin: Zhāng Línpéng; born 9 May 1989) is a Chinese professional footballer who plays as a defender for Chinese Super League club Shanghai Port.

Zhang is known by the nickname "Zhangmos" for his similarity in looks and playstyle to Sergio Ramos. An offensive minded defender, Zhang is also known for his tackling ability and aerial game in China. He was highly praised by Italian manager Marcello Lippi who described him as "the best Chinese footballer in the Chinese Super League".

== Club career ==
Zhang Linpeng would play as a youngster for the Genbao Football Academy before he graduated to the Shanghai East Asia's first team at the beginning of the 2006 league season. With the club in the third tier, Zhang quickly made an impression within the team when he was part of the squad that won promotion to the second tier at the end of the 2007 league season. Within the second tier, Zhang played a major part in ensuring the club remained in the division and by the 2009 season, the club finished fourth and just missed out on promotion. His performance for his club then saw him receive an unexpected call-up to the Chinese national team where he impressed many by scoring on his debut against Jordan, and he became one of the most sought-after players in China.

=== Guangzhou Evergrande ===
In November 2010, Zhang joined Chinese Super League club Guangzhou Evergrande for a fee of ¥12 million.

He made his debut for the club on 2 April 2011 in a 1–0 win against Dalian Shide. Throughout the season, Zhang was used as a squad player as Guangzhou won their first ever league title at the end of the 2012 season. He soon established himself as a mainstay in the team's backline during the 2013 season, leading the club to a third straight league title as well as an AFC Champions League title, the first in the club's history. During preseason before the 2015 season, Zhang sustained a medial accessory ligament tear on his left knee joint on 7 February 2015 in a friendly match against Hangzhou Greentown. While recovering from his surgery in Italy, Zhang was linked with Serie A side Inter Milan with manager Roberto Mancini also confirming his interest in Zhang. However, Guangzhou insisted that Zhang was worth €10 million which far exceeded what Inter was willing to pay. After recovering from injury, Zhang came on as a substitute and scored a goal on 3 April 2015 in a 2–1 loss against Henan Jianye. He then went on to score a 60-meter goal on 12 April 2015 in a 6–1 win against Liaoning Whowin. On 28 May 2015, he suffered a reoccurrence of a left knee strain on 27 May 2015 in a 2–0 win against Seongnam FC. On 20 July 2015, Zhang extended his contract with Guangzhou until 31 December 2020. Zhang returned from injury on 12 August 2015 in a 1–0 win against Jiangsu Sainty. On 28 August 2015, Premier League side Chelsea made an offer to Guangzhou for Zhang, hoping to complete the transfer before the summer transfer window closed; however, the deal couldn't be completed due to limited time while the two clubs failed to agree on certain terms during negotiations. Zhang stayed at Evergrande and won his second AFC Champions League title with the team at the end of the season.

Zhang cemented his status as a club legend at Guangzhou Evergrande after winning 8 league titles, 2 Chinese FA Cup, 4 Chinese FA Super Cup and 2 AFC Champions League.

=== Return to Shanghai Port ===
On 29 April 2022, Zhang transferred back to his old side Shanghai Port after 12 years. On 29 October 2023, Zhang won his ninth league title and the first one with Shanghai Port after a 1–1 home draw against league competitor, Shandong Taishan.

== International career ==
Zhang worked his way up through various youth levels, first by playing for the Chinese under-20 national team in the 2008 AFC U-19 Championship where he captained the team to the quarter-finals. This saw him promoted to the Chinese under-23 national team to play in the 2009 East Asian Games where China disappointingly were knocked out in the group stage.

=== Senior ===
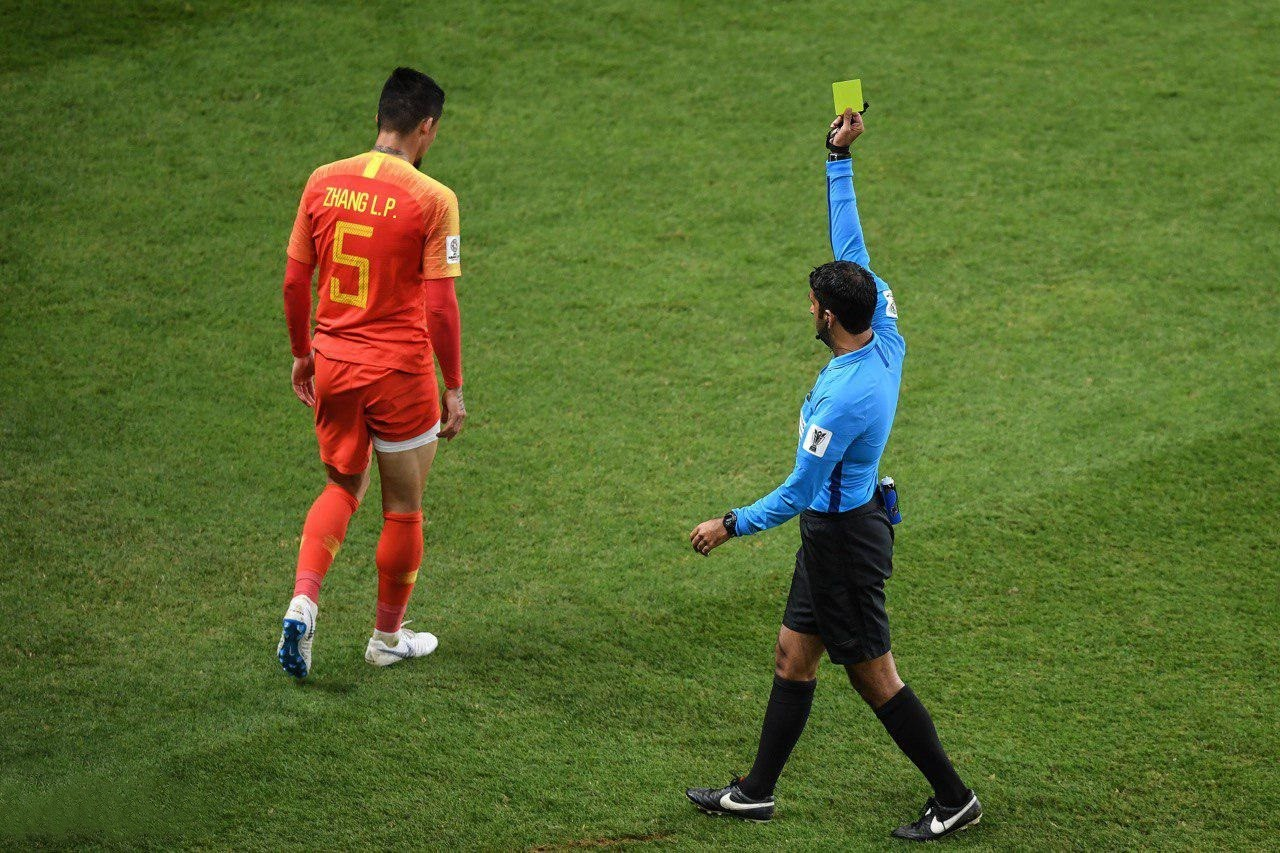
Zhang getting a yellow card in the 2019 AFC Asian Cup match against Thailand.

Despite the under-23 national team's failures, Zhang's performances were considered good enough for then manager Gao Hongbo to unexpectedly call him up to the national team even though he was playing for a second-tier side. He made an impressive international debut on 30 December 2009 in a 2–2 draw against Jordan, scoring on his debut as well. After his debut, Zhang was called up to the squad that won the 2010 East Asian Football Championship before establishing himself as a regular for the team that took part in the 2011 AFC Asian Cup.

Zhang played in all three of China's matches at the 2011 Asian Cup, scoring in the team's 2–0 win over Kuwait. He also started in all four of China's matches at the 2015 AFC Asian Cup, where the team reached the quarter-finals, losing to hosts and eventual winners Australia in Brisbane.

Zhang appeared at his third AFC Asian Cup in 2019 and played the full 90 minutes in all of the team's first four matches. However, he was suspended for the quarter-final against Iran, which China lost 3–0.

On 21 November 2023, Zhang made his 100th appearance for the national team in a 3–0 home defeat against South Korea in the 2026 FIFA World Cup qualification.

In December 2023, Zhang was named in China's squad for the 2023 AFC Asian Cup in Qatar, again played full 90 minutes in all 3 group matches in his fourth tournament and captained the team in the first two.

In March 2024, Zhang announced his retirement from international football after an embarrassing performance against Singapore during the 2026 FIFA World Cup qualifiers, before reversing his decision two days later.

== Personal life ==
Zhang is of Hui ethnicity and was known to be rebellious in his youth. He married his girlfriend Wang Qiaozhi on 21 May 2011 and their son was born on 1 September 2014.

== Career statistics ==
=== Club ===
As of 25 April 2025

Appearances and goals by club, season and competition
Club	Season	League			National cup		Continental		Other		Total	
Club	Season	Division	Apps	Goals	Apps	Goals	Apps	Goals	Apps	Goals	Apps	Goals
Shanghai East Asia	2006	China League Two			–		–		–			
Shanghai East Asia	2007	China League Two			–		–		–			
Shanghai East Asia	2008	China League One	19	0	–		–		–		19	0
Shanghai East Asia	2009	China League One	24	1	–		–		–		24	1
Shanghai East Asia	2010	China League One	22	1	–		–		–		22	1
Shanghai East Asia	Total		65	2	0	0	0	0	0	0	65	2
Guangzhou Evergrande	2011	Chinese Super League	16	1	2	0	–		–		18	1
Guangzhou Evergrande	2012	Chinese Super League	21	2	3	1	7	0	1 (Note: Appearances in Chinese FA Super Cup)	0	32	3
Guangzhou Evergrande	2013	Chinese Super League	23	4	4	1	13	0	4 (Note: One appearance in Chinese FA Super Cup, three appearances in FIFA Club World Cup)	0	44	5
Guangzhou Evergrande	2014	Chinese Super League	27	1	2	0	9	0	0	0	38	1
Guangzhou Evergrande	2015	Chinese Super League	12	4	0	0	10	0	3 (Note: One appearance in Chinese FA Super Cup, two appearances in FIFA Club World Cup)	0	25	4
Guangzhou Evergrande	2016	Chinese Super League	16	0	7	0	3	0	1	0	27	0
Guangzhou Evergrande	2017	Chinese Super League	22	2	1	0	10	0	1	0	34	2
Guangzhou Evergrande	2018	Chinese Super League	26	0	0	0	8	0	1	0	35	0
Guangzhou Evergrande	2019	Chinese Super League	26	0	2	1	11	0	–		39	1
Guangzhou Evergrande	2020	Chinese Super League	17	1	0	0	2	0	–		19	1
Guangzhou Evergrande	2021	Chinese Super League	17	0	0	0	0	0	–		17	0
Guangzhou Evergrande	Total		223	15	21	3	73	0	11	0	328	18
Shanghai Port	2022	Chinese Super League	17	1	2	0	–		–		19	1
Shanghai Port	2023	Chinese Super League	25	0	0	0	1	0	1	0	27	0
Shanghai Port	2024	Chinese Super League	12	1	2	0	2	0	1	0	17	1
Shanghai Port	2025	Chinese Super League	2	0	0	0	2	0	1	0	3	0
Shanghai Port	Total		56	2	4	0	3	0	2	0	64	2
Career total			344	19	25	3	75	0	13	0	457	22

=== International ===
Appearances and goals by national team and year
National team	Year	Apps	Goals
China	2009	1	1
China	2010	13	2
China	2011	5	1
China	2012	4	0
China	2013	8	0
China	2014	9	0
China	2015	8	1
China	2016	7	0
China	2017	7	0
China	2018	6	0
China	2019	11	0
China	2020	0	0
China	2021	9	0
China	2022	4	0
China	2023	9	1
China	2024	4	0
Total		105	6

As of 16 June 2023
Scores and results list China's goal tally first, score column indicates score after each Zhang goal.

List of international goals scored by Zhang Linpeng
No.	Date	Venue	Opponent	Score	Result	Competition
1	30 December 2009	Meihu Sports Centre, Yiwu, China	Jordan	1–0	2–2	Friendly
2	14 January 2010	Mỹ Đình National Stadium, Hanoi, Vietnam	Vietnam	2–0	2–1	2011 AFC Asian Cup qualifier
3	8 October 2010	Tuodong Sports Center, Kunming, China	Syria	2–0	2–1	Friendly
4	8 January 2011	Thani bin Jassim Stadium, Doha, Qatar	Kuwait	1–0	2–0	2011 AFC Asian Cup
5	8 September 2015	Shenyang Sports Center, Shenyang, China	Maldives	3–0	3–0	2018 FIFA World Cup qualifier
6	16 June 2023	Dalian Barracuda Bay Football Stadium, Dalian, China	Myanmar	1–0	4–0	Friendly

== Honours ==
Shanghai Port

- Chinese Super League: 2023, 2024, 2025
- Chinese FA Cup: 2024
- China League Two: 2007

Guangzhou Evergrande

- Chinese Super League: 2011, 2012, 2013, 2014, 2015, 2016, 2017, 2019
- AFC Champions League: 2013, 2015
- Chinese FA Cup: 2012, 2016
- Chinese FA Super Cup: 2012, 2016, 2017, 2018

China

- East Asian Football Championship: 2010

Individual

- Chinese Super League Team of the Year: 2013, 2014, 2015, 2016, 2018
- AFC Champions League Dream Team: 2013, 2015

== See also ==
- List of men's footballers with 100 or more international caps
