= Huang Jiaqiang =

Chinese footballer (born 1990)

Huang Jiaqiang 黄佳强
Personal information
- Full name: Huang Jiaqiang
- Date of birth: 14 March 1990 (age 36)
- Place of birth: Guangzhou, Guangdong, China
- Height: 1.78 m (5 ft 10 in)
- Position: Right-back

Team information
- Current team: Guangdong GZ-Power U19 (team manager)

Youth career
- Guangzhou Evergrande

Senior career*
Years	Team	Apps	(Gls)
2008–2010	→ Guangdong Sunray Cave (loan)	22	(1)
2011–2014	Guangzhou Evergrande	6	(0)
2014–2017	Jiangxi Liansheng	87	(8)
2018–2019	Sichuan Longfor	56	(3)
2020–2022	Nantong Zhiyun	65	(3)
2023	Qingdao West Coast	17	(0)
2024	Guangdong GZ-Power	11	(1)

Managerial career
- 2025-: Guangdong GZ-Power U19 (team manager)
- * Club domestic league appearances and goals as of 31 December 2022

Huang Jiaqiang (Chinese: 黄佳强; pinyin: Huáng Jiāqiáng; born 14 March 1990) is a Chinese former professional footballer who played as a right-back.

== Club career ==
Huang started his professional football career in 2008 when he was loaned to China League Two side Guangdong Sunray Cave from Guangzhou Pharmaceutical for two years. On 10 May 2009, he scored his first senior goal in a league match which Guangdong beat Liaoning Whowin 2–1. His goal came in the 27th minute which was just one minute after he was substituted in. He returned to Guangzhou Pharmaceutical in December 2009 but was eventually loaned back to Guangdong Sunray Cave for another season in March 2010.

In the 2011 league season, Huang mostly played for the Guangzhou Evergrande reserve team. On 18 July 2012, he made his debut for Guangzhou Evergrande in a 2012 Chinese FA Cup match which Guangzhou beat Henan Jianye 2–1, coming on as a substitute for Zhang Hongnan in the second half. His first Chinese Super League debut came on 4 August 2012 in a 2–1 away defeat against Guizhou Renhe when he came on as a substitute for Zheng Zhi in the 81st minute. While he was part of the squad that won the 2013 Chinese Super League title he would join third-tier club Jiangxi Liansheng the following season.

At Jiangxi he would go on to establish himself as a member of the team that went on to win the division title and promotion at the end of the 2014 China League Two campaign. Unfortunately he could not help the club avoid relegation in the 2015 China League One campaign. After four seasons at the club he joined third-tier club Sichuan Longfor and was part of the team that gained promotion and won the 2018 China League One campaign. While he helped aid the club avoid relegation in the following campaign, the club was dissolved at the end of the season due to financial difficulties. Huang would be free to join second-tier club Nantong Zhiyun, where he would establish himself within the team and was part of the squad as they gained promotion to the top tier at the end of the 2022 China League One season.

On 14 August 2025, Huang was retired from professional football and became the team manager of Guangdong GZ-Power U19.

== Career statistics ==
Statistics accurate as of match played 31 December 2022.

Club	Season	League			National Cup		Continental		Other		Total	
Club	Season	Division	Apps	Goals	Apps	Goals	Apps	Goals	Apps	Goals	Apps	Goals
Guangdong Sunray Cave	2008	China League Two	?	?	-		-		-		?	?
Guangdong Sunray Cave	2009	China League One	6	1	-		-		-		6	1
Guangdong Sunray Cave	2010	China League One	16	0	-		-		-		16	0
Guangdong Sunray Cave	Total		22	1	0	0	0	0	0	0	22	1
Guangzhou Evergrande	2011	Chinese Super League	0	0	0	0	-		-		0	0
Guangzhou Evergrande	2012	Chinese Super League	4	0	2	0	0	0	0 (Note: Appearances in Chinese FA Super Cup)	0	6	0
Guangzhou Evergrande	2013	Chinese Super League	2	0	2	0	0	0	0 (Note: Appearances in Chinese FA Super Cup and FIFA Club World Cup)	0	4	0
Guangzhou Evergrande	Total		6	0	4	0	0	0	0	0	10	0
Jiangxi Liansheng	2014	China League Two	11	1	0	0	-		-		11	1
Jiangxi Liansheng	2015	China League One	30	2	2	0	-		-		32	2
Jiangxi Liansheng	2016	China League Two	23	1	1	0	-		-		24	1
Jiangxi Liansheng	2017	China League Two	23	4	3	0	-		-		26	4
Jiangxi Liansheng	Total		87	8	6	0	0	0	0	0	93	8
Sichuan Longfor	2018	China League Two	25	1	3	0	-		-		28	1
Sichuan Longfor	2019	China League One	31	2	0	0	-		-		31	2
Sichuan Longfor	Total		56	3	3	0	0	0	0	0	59	3
Nantong Zhiyun	2020	China League One	1	0	-		-		-		1	0
Nantong Zhiyun	2021	China League One	34	2	1	0	-		-		35	2
Nantong Zhiyun	2022	China League One	30	1	0	0	-		-		30	1
Nantong Zhiyun	Total		65	3	1	0	0	0	0	0	66	3
Career Total			236	15	14	0	0	0	0	0	250	15

== Honours ==
=== Club ===
Guangzhou Evergrande

- Chinese Super League: 2011, 2012, 2013
- Chinese FA Super Cup: 2012
- Chinese FA Cup: 2012
- AFC Champions League: 2013

Jiangxi Liansheng

- China League Two: 2014

Sichuan Longfor

- China League Two: 2018
