= Zhao Peng =

Chinese footballer

Zhao Peng 赵鹏
Personal information
- Full name: Zhao Peng
- Date of birth: 20 June 1983 (age 43)
- Place of birth: Bengbu, Anhui, China
- Height: 1.83 m (6 ft 0 in)
- Position: Centre back

Senior career*
Years	Team	Apps	(Gls)
2003–2013	Henan Jianye	232	(7)
2013–2014	Guangzhou Evergrande	14	(0)
2014	→ Changchun Yatai (loan)	0	(0)
2015	Qingdao Jonoon	1	(0)
2016	Chengdu Qbao	17	(0)
2017–2018	Anhui Hefei Guiguan	12	(1)
2018	Shaanxi Chang'an Athletic	11	(0)

International career^{‡}
2009–2013	China	37	(4)

Managerial career
- 2018: Anhui Hefei Guiguan (assistant)
Medal record
Representing China
Men's football
EAFF Championship
Gold medal – first place	2010 Japan	Team
- * Club domestic league appearances and goals as of 3 November 2018 ‡ National team caps and goals as of 28 November 2014

Zhao Peng (simplified Chinese: 赵鹏; traditional Chinese: 趙鵬; pinyin: Zhào Péng; born 20 June 1983) is a Chinese former footballer.

== Club career ==
Zhao Peng rose to prominence when he was part of the team that helped Henan Jianye win promotion to the Chinese Super League after winning the second tier. The following season saw Zhao play an integral part in the Henan team that saw them fight against relegation throughout much of the season, eventually aiding them in a twelfth-place finish. The following season would see Zhao help establish Henan within the league and by the 2009 league season he would display some impressive performances for Henan that placed the club in their highest ever position of third and entry to the AFC Champions League for the first time.

Along with Yi Teng and Zeng Cheng, Zhao transferred to Guangzhou Evergrande for a fee of ¥20 million on 1 January 2013. On 10 May 2013, he made his debut for Guangzhou in a 3–0 away victory against Shanghai Shenhua, coming on as a substitute for Rong Hao in the 77th minute. He failed to establish himself within the team and spent most of his time in the bench. On 16 June 2014, Zhao was loaned to fellow top-tier side Changchun Yatai for the rest of the 2014 season. However, he didn't make any appearances for Changchun that season due to lingering injuries.

On 14 February 2015, Zhao transferred to China League One side Qingdao Jonoon. On 11 March 2015, Zhao transferred to China League Two side Chengdu Qbao.

On 23 February 2019, Zhao Peng officially announced his retirement from professional football.

== International career ==
Zhao made his debut for the Chinese national team in a 1–1 draw against Germany on 29 May 2009. He would play in several further friendlies and even score his first goal in a 4–1 win against Botswana on 30 September 2009.

== Career statistics ==
=== International goals ===
#	Date	Venue	Opponent	Score	Result	Competition
1	30 September 2009	Hohhot, China	Botswana	3–0	4–1	Friendly international
2	8 October 2010	Kunming, China	Syria	1–0	2–1	Friendly international
	2 January 2011	Doha, Qatar	Iraq	2–2	3–2	Friendly international (non FIFA "A" match)
3	10 August 2011	Hefei, China	Jamaica	1–0	1–0	Friendly international
4	14 November 2012	Shanghai, China	New Zealand	1–0	1–1	Friendly international

== Honours ==
=== Club ===
Henan Jianye

- China League One: 2006

Guangzhou Evergrande

- Chinese Super League: 2013
- AFC Champions League: 2013

=== International ===
China PR national football team

- East Asian Football Championship: 2010

=== Individual ===
- Chinese Super League Team of the Year: 2009
