= Coelho Neto, Maranhão =

Coordinates: 4°15′25″S 43°00′46″W

- Municipality
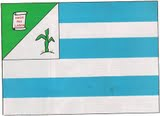
- Flag Coat of arms
- Interactive map of Coelho Neto, Maranhão
- Country: Brazil
- Region: Nordeste
- State: Maranhão
- Mesoregion: Leste Maranhense

Population (2020)
  - Total: 49,621
- Time zone: UTC−3 (BRT)

Coelho Neto, Maranhão is a municipality in the state of Maranhão in the Northeast region of Brazil.

== See also ==
- List of municipalities in Maranhão
