= Shewket Yalqun =

Uyghur-Chinese footballer (born 1993)

Shewket Yalqun شەۋكەت يالقۇن
Personal information
- Full name: Shewket Yalqun
- Date of birth: 7 February 1993 (age 33)
- Place of birth: Artux, Xinjiang, China
- Height: 1.73 m (5 ft 8 in)
- Position: Left winger

Youth career
- Xinjiang Youth

Senior career*
Years	Team	Apps	(Gls)
2012–2021	Guangzhou Evergrande	7	(0)
2014	→ Qingdao Hainiu (loan)	25	(3)
2015–2017	→ Xinjiang Tianshan Leopard (loan)	66	(2)
2019	→ Xinjiang Tianshan Leopard (loan)	14	(2)
- * Club domestic league appearances and goals as of 00:55, 31 December 2020 (UTC)

Shewket Yalqun

Chinese name
- Simplified Chinese: 肖开提·亚力昆
- Traditional Chinese: 肖開提·亞力昆
Transcriptions
Standard Mandarin
- Hanyu Pinyin: Xiāokāití Yàlìkūn
- IPA: [ɕjáʊ kʰáɪ tʰǐ jâ lî kʰwə́n]

Uyghur name
- Uyghur: Uyghur: شەۋكەت يالقۇن

Memet Ali

Chinese name
- Simplified Chinese: 买买提·艾力
- Traditional Chinese: 買買提·艾力
Transcriptions
Standard Mandarin
- Hanyu Pinyin: Mǎimǎití Àilì
- IPA: [màɪ màɪ tʰǐ âɪ lî]

Uyghur name
- Uyghur: Uyghur: مەمەت ئەلى

Shewket Yalqun (Chinese: 肖开提·亚力昆; born 7 February 1993 in Artux), formerly known as Memet Ali (Chinese: 买买提·艾力), is a Chinese footballer.

== Club career ==
Shewket Yalqun transferred to Chinese Super League side Guangzhou Evergrande for a fee of ¥100,000 in January 2012. He used the name Memet Ali to register for the 2012 league season. He made his senior debut on 30 March 2012 in a 1–0 away win against Shanghai Shenhua, coming on as a substitute for Gao Lin in the 81st minute. However, he was sent to play for the reserve team after Italian manager Marcello Lippi took charge of the team. Shewket made six league appearances during the 2012 season.

He was involved in an age controversy in early 2013 when Guangzhou Evergrande found out he used a different name Shewket Yalqun to register in the league. Guangzhou reported it to the Chinese Football Association. In March 2013, he received a ban of three months for age falsification. He returned to field on 10 July 2013 in the fourth round of 2013 Chinese FA Cup in which Guangzhou beat Dalian Ruilong 7–1. On 7 August 2013, he scored his first senior goal in the fifth round of FA Cup which ensured Guangzhou draw with Hangzhou Greentown 2–2 after 90 minutes and beat Hangzhou 5–3 in the penalty shootout.

In January 2014, Shewket moved to China League One side Qingdao Hainiu on a one-year loan deal. He made his debut for the club on 15 March 2014 in a 1-1 draw against Chengdu Tiancheng. In January 2015, he was loaned to League One side Xinjiang Tianshan Leopard for one year. Xinjiang extended his loan deal for another year at the beginning of 2016 season.

== Career statistics ==
Statistics accurate as of match played 31 December 2020.

Appearances and goals by club, season and competition
Club	Season	League			National Cup		Continental		Other		Total	
Club	Season	Division	Apps	Goals	Apps	Goals	Apps	Goals	Apps	Goals	Apps	Goals
Guangzhou Evergrande	2012	Chinese Super League	6	0	0	0	0	0	0 (Note: Appearances in Chinese FA Super Cup)	0	6	0
Guangzhou Evergrande	2013	Chinese Super League	1	0	2	1	0	0	0	0	3	1
Guangzhou Evergrande	2018	Chinese Super League	0	0	0	0	0	0	0	0	0	0
Guangzhou Evergrande	Total		7	0	2	1	0	0	0	0	9	1
Qingdao Hainiu (loan)	2014	China League One	25	3	5	1	-		-		30	4
Xinjiang Tianshan Leopard (loan)	2015	China League One	24	2	4	1	-		-		28	3
Xinjiang Tianshan Leopard (loan)	2016	China League One	23	0	1	0	-		-		24	0
Xinjiang Tianshan Leopard (loan)	2017	China League One	19	0	0	0	-		-		19	0
Xinjiang Tianshan Leopard (loan)	Total		66	2	5	1	0	0	0	0	71	3
Xinjiang Tianshan Leopard (loan)	2019	China League One	14	2	0	0	-		-		14	2
Career Total			112	7	12	3	0	0	0	0	124	10

== Honours ==
=== Club ===
Guangzhou Evergrande

- Chinese Super League: 2012, 2013
- Chinese FA Super Cup: 2012
- Chinese FA Cup: 2012
- AFC Champions League: 2013
