= Zhang Hongnan =

Chinese footballer

Zhang Hongnan 张宏楠
Personal information
- Full name: Zhang Hongnan
- Date of birth: 17 January 1991 (age 35)
- Place of birth: Shenyang, Liaoning, China
- Height: 1.82 m (5 ft 11 1/2 in)
- Position: Defender

Youth career
- Guangzhou Evergrande

Senior career*
| Years | Team | Apps | (Gls) |
| 2009–2015 | Guangzhou Evergrande | 3 | (0) |
| 2014 | → Qingdao Jonoon (loan) | 22 | (0) |
| 2015 | → Shenzhen Ruby (loan) | 14 | (0) |
| 2016–2017 | Shenzhen FC | 1 | (0) |
| 2018 | Hainan Boying | 24 | (1) |
| 2019-2020 | Shenzhen Bogang | 6 | (0) |

International career^{‡}
| 2009–2010 | China U-20 | | |
- * Club domestic league appearances and goals as of 13 October 2018 ‡ National team caps and goals as of 1 November 2014

Zhang Hongnan (Chinese: 张宏楠; pinyin: Zhāng Hóngnán; born 17 January 1991) is a Chinese footballer.

== Club career ==
Zhang Hongnan was promoted to Guangzhou Pharmaceutical's first team squad in 2009, but didn't have a chance to appear in the league game until 2012. On 11 May 2012, he made his debut for Guangzhou Evergrande in a 3-1 loss against Dalian Shide. Zhang played at left back in the match; however, he was responsible for all three goals which Guangzhou conceded and was subsequently substituted by Tang Dechao in the 70th minute. In February 2014, Zhang moved to China League One side Qingdao Jonoon on a one-year loan deal.

Zhang was loaned to League One side Shenzhen FC in February 2015. He transferred to Shenzhen FC in January 2016.

On 4 March 2018, Zhang transferred to China League Two side Hainan Boying.

== International career ==
Zhang received his first call-up to the Chinese under-20 national team in June 2009 and played in the 2010 AFC U-19 Championship qualification. He received the call-up once for the Chinese under-22 national team in April 2012 for an international friendly against Malawi, but he did not appear in the match.

== Career statistics ==
Statistics accurate as of match played 13 October 2018

| Club performance | | | League | | Cup | | League Cup | | Continental | | Total | |
| Season | Club | League | Apps | Goals | Apps | Goals | Apps | Goals | Apps | Goals | Apps | Goals |
| China PR | | | League | | FA Cup | | CSL Cup | | Asia | | Total | |
|---|---|---|---|---|---|---|---|---|---|---|---|---|
| 2009 | Guangzhou Evergrande | Chinese Super League | 0 | 0 | - | | - | | - | | 0 | 0 |
| 2010 | Guangzhou Evergrande | China League One | 0 | 0 | - | | - | | - | | 0 | 0 |
| 2011 | Guangzhou Evergrande | Chinese Super League | 0 | 0 | 0 | 0 | - | | - | | 0 | 0 |
| 2012 | Guangzhou Evergrande | Chinese Super League | 1 | 0 | 1 | 0 | - | | 0 | 0 | 2 | 0 |
| 2013 | Guangzhou Evergrande | Chinese Super League | 2 | 0 | 1 | 0 | - | | 0 | 0 | 3 | 0 |
| 2014 | Qingdao Jonoon | China League One | 22 | 0 | 2 | 0 | - | | - | | 24 | 0 |
| 2015 | Shenzhen FC | China League One | 14 | 0 | 0 | 0 | - | | - | | 14 | 0 |
| 2016 | Shenzhen FC | China League One | 1 | 0 | 0 | 0 | - | | - | | 1 | 0 |
| 2017 | Shenzhen FC | China League One | 0 | 0 | 0 | 0 | - | | - | | 0 | 0 |
| 2018 | Hainan Boying | China League Two | 24 | 1 | 3 | 0 | - | | - | | 27 | 1 |
| Total | China PR | | 64 | 1 | 7 | 0 | 0 | 0 | 0 | 0 | 71 | 1 |

== Honours ==
=== Club ===
Guangzhou Evergrande

- China League One: 2010
- Chinese Super League: 2011, 2012, 2013
- Chinese FA Super Cup: 2012
- Chinese FA Cup: 2012
- AFC Champions League: 2013
