= Gao Lin =

Chinese footballer (born 1986)

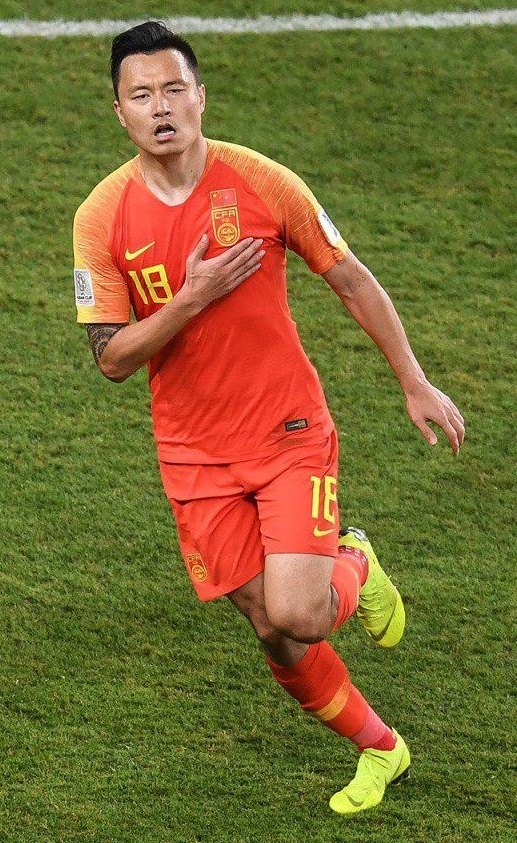
- Gao Lin with China at the 2019 AFC Asian Cup

Personal information
- Date of birth: 14 February 1986 (age 40)
- Place of birth: Zhengzhou, Henan, China
- Height: 1.85 m (6 ft 1 in)
- Position: Forward

Team information
- Current team: Guangdong Mingtu (general manager)

Youth career
- 1999–2001: Qinhuangdao Football School
- 2001–2004: Shanghai Shenhua

Senior career*
Years	Team	Apps	(Gls)
2005–2009	Shanghai Shenhua	71	(14)
2010–2019	Guangzhou Evergrande	259	(93)
2020–2022	Shenzhen FC	58	(13)
Total		388	(120)

International career^{‡}
2004–2005	China U20		
2006–2008	China U23		
2005–2019	China	109	(22)
Medal record
Representing China
Men's football
EAFF Championship
Gold medal – first place	2005 South Korea	Team
Gold medal – first place	2010 Japan	Team
Silver medal – second place	2013 South Korea	Team
Silver medal – second place	2015 China	Team
East Asian Games
Gold medal – first place	2001 Macau	Football
- * Club domestic league appearances and goals as of 12 July 2023 ‡ National team caps and goals as of 24 January 2019

Gao Lin
- Chinese: 郜林
Transcriptions
Standard Mandarin
- Hanyu Pinyin: Gào Lín
- IPA: [kâʊ lǐn]

Gao Lin (Chinese: 郜林; pinyin: Gào Lín; Mandarin pronunciation: [kâʊ lǐn] born 14 February 1986) is a Chinese former professional footballer who played as a forward.

He is the all-time top goalscorer for Guangzhou Evergrande with 113 goals, and has also made the most appearances for the club. Gao is considered one of China's most technical strikers and is known by the nickname Gao Linsmann (Chinese: 郜林斯曼; pinyin: Gàolínsīmàn; [kâʊ lǐn sɹ̩́ mân]).

== Club career ==
=== Shanghai Shenhua ===
Gao Lin started his football career with Shanghai Shenhua in 2005 where he made his league debut on 21 August 2005 in a 1–0 win against Liaoning Zhongyu, coming on as a substitute for Xie Hui. While his height and heading ability were quickly utilized, Gao was unable to establish himself as an immediate first team regular within the team throughout the subsequent seasons and often found himself playing on the flanks. It was only once Xie left Shanghai at the end of the 2007 league season before Gao started to really establish himself as a regular first team member, playing as striker once more. In the 2008 season, he would score eight goals in 21 league appearances to help guide Shanghai to a runners-up position.

Despite having his most productive season with Shanghai and establishing himself within the Chinese national team. Gao's contract was up for renewal and his club would transfer list him in early 2009. This saw him linked with his hometown club of Henan Construction as well as K-League club Jeonbuk Hyundai Motors; however, nothing materialized from these rumours after Gao decided to eventually stay at the club when it was announced that Shanghai and Gao had come to terms about a contract renewal which would expire in 2012.

=== Guangzhou Evergrande ===
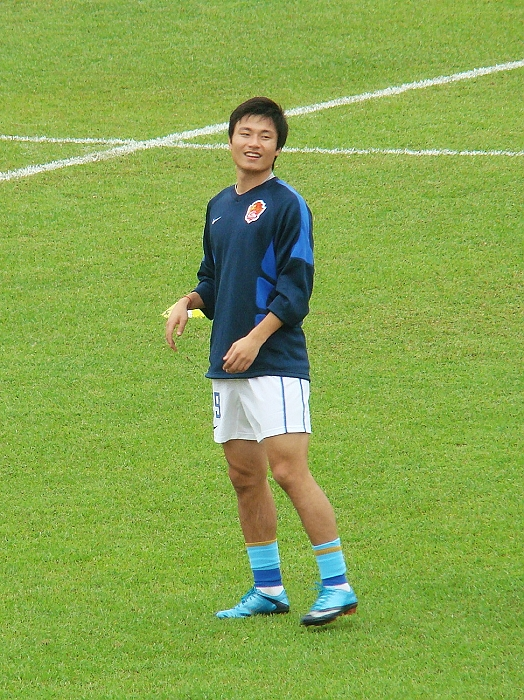
Gao in his debut match for Guangzhou Evergrande in 2010.

On 10 March 2010, Gao transferred to Guangzhou Evergrande, who were newly relegated to China League One in the fallout of a match-fixing scandal. However, the club's new owners, Evergrande Real Estate Group, were able to tempt Gao with a lucrative 3,000,000 yuan a year deal to play within the second tier. He made his debut for the club on 3 April 2010 in a 3–1 against Beijing BIT, also scoring his first two goals for the club. On 30 October 2010, Guangzhou successfully finished as second tier champions for the second time with a 3–1 win against Hunan Billows. Gao's first half hat-trick in this match ensured that he finished the season as the second tier top goalscorer, having scored 20 goals.

Although Guangzhou signed several players to strengthened the team's attacking power including Darío Conca and Cléo in the 2011 season, Gao was still a regular in the team, playing mostly as a left winger and scoring 11 goals in 29 appearances. Guangzhou eventually won the top tier league title for the first time in the club's history as Gao won his first top tier league title with the club.

Gao scored his first goal of the season on 15 May 2012 in a 2–1 win against Buriram United in the 2012 AFC Champions League, ending a goal drought that stretched 1403 minutes. On 20 May 2012, he scored his first league goal of the season in a 1–0 win against Qingdao Jonoon which ended a run of 936 minutes without a goal in the league. On 27 October 2012, Gao scored the decisive goal, assisted by Conca, in injury time in a 1–0 win against Liaoning Whowin to give Guangzhou their second top tier league title and they became the first team ever in the league's history to defend the title.

In the first leg of the 2012 Chinese FA Cup final, Gao received two yellow cards in less than three minutes at the start of the 80th minute. The first yellow card was for dissent on a questionable tackle. The second one came after protesting and dissent which earned him a red card and suspended him from playing in the second leg. On 12 November 2012, Gao was fined by the CFA for $200,000 for his actions in the first leg of the final. Later, Gao took to Weibo to publicly apologize to his millions of followers and said he "deserved to be punished" because it will help him "to not do it again in the future". Later in November 2012, he was selected as one of the two forwards in the 2012 Chinese Super League Team of the Year alongside Cristian Dănălache of Jiangsu Sainty.

During the 2013 season, his role shifted from an attacking role to an assister as he provided many assists to the foreign contingent of Elkeson, Dario Conca and Muriqui. Throughout both the 2013 season and 2013 AFC Champions League, his style of play included more flair as he attempted bicycle kicks and back-heel passes which many plaudits lauded. Gao was a cog in the engine of Guangzhou as he helped it through its golden year to win its third successive top tier league title. In the league-winning game, he scored the third goal for the club on 6 October 2013 in a 4–2 win against Shandong Luneng. This was the second time in which Gao has scored in a league-winning game.

=== Shenzhen FC ===
On 24 February 2020, Gao signed for Shenzhen FC on a free transfer. He made his debut and scored his first goal for the club on 26 July 2020 in 3–0 win against Guangzhou R&F.

== International career ==
Gao was part of the squad in the 2008 Summer Olympics where he played in all three group games and started in the first two games as the Chinese under-23 national team were knocked out in the group stage.

Gao made his debut for the Chinese national team against South Korea on 31 July 2005 in the 2005 East Asian Football Championship where he was sent off mistakenly by referee Yuichi Nishimura; The East Asian Football Federation cancelled Gao's red card and apologized to him the next day. After that inauspicious start to his international career, Gao started to impose himself within the team, and despite making his debut in 2005 for the national team, Gao had to wait until 21 January 2009 to score his first goal in a 6–1 win against Vietnam during 2011 AFC Asian Cup qualification, scoring a hat-trick.

Gao scored in a 3–0 win against South Korea during the 2010 East Asian Football Championship, helping China beat South Korea for the first time ever. Gao captained the national team for the first time on 22 February 2012 in a 2–0 win against Kuwait. On 10 September 2018, Gao won his 100th cap for China in a 0–0 draw against Bahrain, making him the fifth Chinese man to win 100 caps.

== Personal life ==
Gao married Wang Chen, who is a reporter and host for Shenzhen Media Group, on 3 September 2013. Gao's childhood idol is the revered German striker Jürgen Klinsmann. He prefers to wear the kit number 18 while playing for the Chinese national team in honour of Klinsmann. While at the 2008 Beijing Olympics, he wore the kit number 9, which was also worn by Klinsmann during the 1998 Seoul Olympics.

== Career statistics ==
=== Club ===
As of 31 December 2022

Appearances and goals by club, season and competition
Club	Season	League			National cup		League cup		Continental		Other		Total	
Club	Season	Division	Apps	Goals	Apps	Goals	Apps	Goals	Apps	Goals	Apps	Goals	Apps	Goals
Shanghai Shenhua	2005	Chinese Super League	5	0	1	0	0	0	—		—		6	0
Shanghai Shenhua	2006	Chinese Super League	14	2	2	0	–		4	5	—		20	7
Shanghai Shenhua	2007	Chinese Super League	12	0	—		–		6	1	1 (Note: Appearances in A3 Champions Cup)	0	21	1
Shanghai Shenhua	2008	Chinese Super League	21	8	—		—		—		—		21	8
Shanghai Shenhua	2009	Chinese Super League	19	4	—		–		0	0	—		19	4
Shanghai Shenhua	Total		71	14	3	0	0	0	10	6	1	0	85	20
Guangzhou Evergrande	2010	China League One	23	20	—		—		—		—		23	20
Guangzhou Evergrande	2011	Chinese Super League	29	11	2	0	—		—		—		31	11
Guangzhou Evergrande	2012	Chinese Super League	24	6	3	0	—		9	2	1 (Note: Appearances in Chinese FA Super Cup)	0	37	8
Guangzhou Evergrande	2013	Chinese Super League	28	8	5	1	—		13	3	4 (Note: One appearance in Chinese FA Super Cup, three appearances in FIFA Club World Cup)	0	50	12
Guangzhou Evergrande	2014	Chinese Super League	28	8	2	0	—		8	3	0	0	38	11
Guangzhou Evergrande	2015	Chinese Super League	25	13	0	0	—		11	1	4	0	40	14
Guangzhou Evergrande	2016	Chinese Super League	28	7	7	3	—		6	2	0	0	41	12
Guangzhou Evergrande	2017	Chinese Super League	29	9	4	3	—		10	0	1	0	44	12
Guangzhou Evergrande	2018	Chinese Super League	28	10	0	0	—		7	0	1	1	36	11
Guangzhou Evergrande	2019	Chinese Super League	17	1	2	1	—		10	0	—		29	2
Guangzhou Evergrande	Total		259	93	25	8	0	0	74	11	11	1	369	113
Shenzhen FC	2020	Chinese Super League	17	6	0	0	—		—		—		17	6
Shenzhen FC	2021	Chinese Super League	21	3	1	1	—		—		—		22	4
Shenzhen FC	2022	Chinese Super League	20	4	0	0	—		—		—		20	4
Shenzhen FC	2023	Chinese Super League	0	0	0	0	—		—		—		0	0
Shenzhen FC	Total		58	13	1	1	0	0	0	0	0	0	59	14
Career total			388	120	29	9	0	0	84	17	12	1	513	147

=== International ===
Appearances and goals by national team and year
National team	Year	Apps	Goals
China	2005	4	0
China	2006	4	0
China	2007	0	0
China	2008	8	0
China	2009	14	6
China	2010	11	2
China	2011	10	5
China	2012	7	3
China	2013	11	0
China	2014	9	2
China	2015	7	0
China	2016	5	0
China	2017	7	2
China	2018	7	1
China	2019	5	1
Total		109	22

As of 20 January 2019
Scores and results list China's goal tally first, score column indicates score after each Lin goal.

List of international goals scored by Gao Lin
No.	Date	Venue	Opponent	Score	Result	Competition
1	21 January 2009	Yellow Dragon Sports Center, Hangzhou, China	Vietnam	1–0	6–1	2011 AFC Asian Cup qualification
2	21 January 2009	Yellow Dragon Sports Center, Hangzhou, China	Vietnam	2–1	6–1	2011 AFC Asian Cup qualification
3	21 January 2009	Yellow Dragon Sports Center, Hangzhou, China	Vietnam	6–1	6–1	2011 AFC Asian Cup qualification
4	1 June 2009	Olympic Sports Center Stadium, Qinhuangdao, China	Iran	1–0	1–0	Friendly
5	18 July 2009	TEDA Football Stadium, Tianjin, China	Palestine	2–0	3–1	Friendly
6	30 September 2009	Hohhot City Stadium, Hohhot, China	Botswana	1–0	4–1	Friendly
7	10 February 2010	Ajinomoto Stadium, Tokyo, Japan	South Korea	2–0	3–0	2010 EAFF Championship
8	7 September 2010	Olympic Sports Centre, Nanjing, China	Paraguay	1–1	1–1	Friendly
9	26 March 2011	Estadio Nacional, San José, Costa Rica	Costa Rica	1–2	2–2	Friendly
10	26 March 2011	Estadio Nacional, San José, Costa Rica	Costa Rica	2–2	2–2	Friendly
11	5 June 2011	Tuodong Stadium, Kunming, China	Uzbekistan	1–0	1–0	Friendly
12	8 June 2011	Olympic Sports Center, Guiyang, China	North Korea	2–0	2–0	Friendly
13	6 October 2011	Universiade Sports Centre, Shenzhen, China	United Arab Emirates	2–0	2–1	Friendly
	22 February 2012	Helong Stadium, Changsha, China	Kuwait	1–0	2–0	Friendly^{1}
14	8 June 2012	Wuhan Sports Center Stadium, Wuhan, China	Vietnam	1–0	3–0	Friendly
15	8 June 2012	Wuhan Sports Center Stadium, Wuhan, China	Vietnam	3–0	3–0	Friendly
16	15 August 2012	Shaanxi Province Stadium, Xi'an, China	Ghana	1–0	1–1	Friendly
17	29 June 2014	Bao'an Stadium, Shenzhen, China	Mali	1–2	1–3	Friendly
18	9 September 2014	Harbin Sports City Center Stadium, Harbin, China	Jordan	1–0	1–1	Friendly
	17 December 2014	Evergrande Football Base, Qingyuan, China	Kyrgyzstan	1–0	2–0	Friendly^{1}
19	13 June 2017	Hang Jebat Stadium, Krubong, Malaysia	Syria	1–1	2–2	2018 FIFA World Cup qualification
20	31 August 2017	Wuhan Sports Center Stadium, Wuhan, China	Uzbekistan	1–0	1–0	2018 FIFA World Cup qualification
21	16 October 2018	Olympic Sports Centre, Nanjing, China	Syria	1–0	2–0	Friendly
22	20 January 2019	Hazza bin Zayed Stadium, Al Ain, United Arab Emirates	Thailand	2–1	2–1	2019 AFC Asian Cup
1:Non FIFA 'A' international match

== Honours ==
Shanghai Shenhua

- A3 Champions Cup: 2007

Guangzhou Evergrande

- Chinese Super League: 2011, 2012, 2013, 2014, 2015, 2016, 2017, 2019
- AFC Champions League: 2013, 2015
- China League One: 2010
- Chinese FA Cup: 2012, 2016
- Chinese FA Super Cup: 2012, 2016, 2017, 2018

China

- East Asian Football Championship: 2005, 2010

Individual

- China League One top goalscorer: 2010
- Chinese Super League Team of the Year: 2012, 2016, 2017

== See also ==
- List of men's footballers with 100 or more international caps
