= Zeng Cheng =

Chinese footballer

Zeng Cheng 曾诚
Personal information
- Full name: Zeng Cheng
- Date of birth: 8 January 1987 (age 39)
- Place of birth: Wuhan, Hubei, China
- Height: 1.91 m (6 ft 3 in)
- Position: Goalkeeper

Senior career*
Years	Team	Apps	(Gls)
2005–2008	Wuhan Guanggu	21	(0)
2005	→ Persebaya Surabaya (loan)	25	(0)
2009–2012	Henan Jianye	105	(0)
2013–2020	Guangzhou Evergrande	161	(0)
2020	→ Shanghai Shenhua (loan)	14	(0)
2021–2023	Shanghai Shenhua	32	(0)

International career^{‡}
2009–2018	China	42	(0)
Medal record
Representing China
Men's football
EAFF Championship
Gold medal – first place	2010 Japan	Team
Silver medal – second place	2013 South Korea	Team
Silver medal – second place	2015 China	Team
- * Club domestic league appearances and goals as of 4 November 2023 ‡ National team caps and goals as of 27 October 2019

Zeng Cheng
- Simplified Chinese: 曾诚
- Traditional Chinese: 曾誠
Transcriptions
Standard Mandarin
- Hanyu Pinyin: Zēng Chéng
- IPA: [tsə́ŋ ʈʂʰə̌ŋ]

Zeng Cheng (Chinese: 曾诚; pinyin: Zēng Chéng; born 8 January 1987) is a Chinese former professional footballer who played as goalkeeper

== Club career ==
Zeng Cheng started his football career at top-tier side Wuhan Guanggu; however, he was soon loaned out to Indonesia Super League side Persebaya for more playing time at the beginning of the 2005 season. On his return to Wuhan, he would be allowed to make his league debut at the end of the league season on 5 November 2005 in a 1–1 draw against Shanghai Shenhua. For several seasons, Zeng would play understudy to Deng Xiaofei until Wuhan quit the league and were subsequently relegated in the 2008 season after the club's management did not accept the punishment given to them by the Chinese Football Association after a scuffle broke out during a league game against Beijing Guoan on 27 September 2008.

At the beginning of the 2009 season, Zeng transferred to another top-tier side Henan Jianye where he established himself as the first-choice goalkeeper ahead of Zhou Yajun. The move turned out to be a big success and the club would finish in it highest ever position of third place in the league and qualify for the AFC Champions League for the first time in the club's history.

On 1 January 2013, along with Zhao Peng and Yi Teng, Zeng successfully transferred to two-time, back-to-back Chinese Super League champions Guangzhou Evergrande on a free transfer. During the 2013 season, Zeng established himself as Guangzhou's first-choice goalkeeper due to impressive displays which impressed manager Marcello Lippi. At the end of the season, Lippi credited Zeng as "one of Guangzhou's best buys." Zeng finished the 2013 season only conceding 16 goals and kept 13 clean sheets in 27 matches in the league. He was an important cog in what was considered absolute dominance by Guangzhou during the group and knockout stages of the AFC Champions League that season. On 9 November 2013, Zeng won the continental title with the club, winning the finals against FC Seoul in a two-legged tie which ended with them winning on away goals.

On 6 September 2016, Zeng suffered a rupture of posterior cruciate ligament in his left knee during a 2018 FIFA World Cup qualification match against Iran, ruling him out for the rest of the 2016 season. He played 23 league matches and kept 10 clean sheets in the 2016 season as he was awarded with the Chinese Football Association Goalkeeper of The Year award for the third time in November 2016.

== International career ==
Zeng's performances for Henan Jianye at the beginning of the 2009 season would see the China national team manager Gao Hongbo call him up to the international set-up for the first time. He made his debut against Iran in a friendly which China won 1–0 on 1 June 2009. After that game, he would become the national team's second choice goalkeeper behind Yang Zhi and be included in the squad that won the 2010 East Asian Football Championship before being included in the 2011 AFC Asian Cup squad.

== Career statistics ==
=== Club statistics ===
As of 4 November 2023

Appearances and goals by club, season and competition
Club	Season	League			National Cup		League Cup		Continental		Other		Total	
Club	Season	Division	Apps	Goals	Apps	Goals	Apps	Goals	Apps	Goals	Apps	Goals	Apps	Goals
Persebaya (loan)	2005	Premier Division	25	0	0	0	-		6	0	-		31	0
Wuhan Guanggu	2005	Chinese Super League	1	0	0	0	0	0	-		-		1	0
Wuhan Guanggu	2006	Chinese Super League	12	0	1	0	-		-		-		13	0
Wuhan Guanggu	2007	Chinese Super League	7	0	-		-		-		-		7	0
Wuhan Guanggu	2008	Chinese Super League	1	0	-		-		-		-		1	0
Wuhan Guanggu	Total		21	0	1	0	0	0	0	0	0	0	22	0
Henan Jianye	2009	Chinese Super League	29	0	-		-		-		-		29	0
Henan Jianye	2010	Chinese Super League	23	0	-		-		6	0	-		29	0
Henan Jianye	2011	Chinese Super League	26	0	0	0	-		-		-		26	0
Henan Jianye	2012	Chinese Super League	27	0	0	0	-		-		-		27	0
Henan Jianye	Total		105	0	0	0	0	0	6	0	0	0	111	0
Guangzhou Evergrande	2013	Chinese Super League	27	0	4	0	-		14	0	3 (Note: One appearance in Chinese FA Super Cup, Two appearances in FIFA Club World Cup)	0	48	0
Guangzhou Evergrande	2014	Chinese Super League	26	0	0	0	-		10	0	0 (Note: Appearances in Chinese FA Super Cup)	0	36	0
Guangzhou Evergrande	2015	Chinese Super League	25	0	0	0	-		11	0	1	0	37	0
Guangzhou Evergrande	2016	Chinese Super League	23	0	5	0	-		5	0	1	0	34	0
Guangzhou Evergrande	2017	Chinese Super League	29	0	1	0	-		10	0	1	0	41	0
Guangzhou Evergrande	2018	Chinese Super League	27	0	0	0	-		6	0	0	0	33	0
Guangzhou Evergrande	2019	Chinese Super League	4	0	1	0	-		7	0	-		12	0
Guangzhou Evergrande	Total		161	0	11	0	0	0	63	0	6	0	241	0
Shanghai Shenhua (loan)	2020	Chinese Super League	14	0	0	0	-		0	0	-		14	0
Shanghai Shenhua	2021	Chinese Super League	7	0	6	0	-		-		-		13	0
Shanghai Shenhua	2022	Chinese Super League	11	0	1	0	-		-		-		12	0
Shanghai Shenhua	2023	Chinese Super League	0	0	0	0	-		-		-		0	0
Shanghai Shenhua	Total		18	0	7	0	0	0	0	0	0	0	25	0
Career total			344	0	19	0	0	0	75	0	6	0	444	0

=== International statistics ===
National team
Year	Apps	Goals
2009	3	0
2010	6	0
2011	2	0
2012	5	0
2013	9	0
2014	5	0
2015	1	0
2016	5	0
2017	5	0
2018	1	0
Total	42	0

== Honours ==
=== Club ===
Wuhan Guanggu

- Chinese Super League Cup: 2005

Guangzhou Evergrande

- Chinese Super League: 2013, 2014, 2015, 2016, 2017, 2019
- AFC Champions League: 2013, 2015
- Chinese FA Cup: 2016
- Chinese FA Super Cup: 2016, 2017, 2018

=== International ===
China PR national football team

- East Asian Football Championship: 2010

=== Individual ===
- Chinese Football Association Goalkeeper of the Year: 2013, 2015, 2016
- Chinese Super League Team of the Year: 2013, 2015, 2016
