= 2008 Guangzhou Pharmaceutical F.C. season =

Guangzhou FC
2008 season
- Chairman: Yang Rongming
- Manager: Shen Xiangfu
- Stadium: Yuexiushan Stadium
- Chinese Super League: 7th
- Top goalscorer: Luis Ramírez (12)
- Highest home attendance: 25,360 v Henan Construction; 2 November
- Lowest home attendance: 10,000 v Liaoning Hongyun; 5 October
- Average home league attendance: 19,624
Home colours	Away colours

The 2008 season was Guangzhou FC's first season in the Chinese Super League. This article shows statistics of the club's players in the season, and also lists all matches that the club played in the 2008 season.

== First-team squad ==
=== Players ===
Note: Flags indicate national team as defined under FIFA eligibility rules; some limited exceptions apply. Players may hold more than one non-FIFA nationality.

No.	Pos.	Nation	Player
1	GK	CHN	Zhi Xinhua
2	DF	CHN	Li Zhihai (Captain)
3	MF	CHN	Li Yan
4	DF	CHN	Zhou Lin
5	DF	PER	Ismael Enrique Alvarado
6	MF	CHN	Huang Zhiyi
7	MF	CHN	Feng Junyan
8	FW	BRA	José Filho Duarte
9	FW	HON	Luis Alfredo Ramírez
10	FW	BRA	Diego
11	FW	CHN	Wen Xiaoming
12	GK	CHN	Zhang Si
13	FW	CHN	Tang Dechao
14	MF	CHN	Cao Zhijie

No.	Pos.	Nation	Player
15	MF	CHN	Ma Liang
16	MF	CHN	Xu Deen
17	MF	CHN	Cai Yaohui
18	FW	CHN	Yang Pengfeng
19	DF	CHN	Zhang Suozhi
20	MF	CHN	Xu Liang (Vice-captain)
21	MF	CHN	Jia Wenpeng
22	GK	CHN	Li Shuai
23	MF	CHN	Lu Lin
24	DF	CHN	Wang Xiaoshi
25	MF	CHN	Gao Ming
26	MF	CHN	Wu Pingfeng
27	MF	CHN	Luo Xi
28	MF	CHN	Bai Lei

=== Technical staff ===
Position	Staff
Head coach	(China) Shen Xiangfu
Assistant coach	(China) Tang Pengju
Assistant coach	(China) Ren Jiaqing
Assistant coach	(China) Sun Chengyao
Goalkeeping coach	(Serbia) Edin
Fitness coach	(China) Ye Zhibin

== Transfers ==
=== In ===
#	Pos	Player	From
5	DF	(Peru) Ismael Alvarado	(Peru) Alianza Lima
8	FW	(Brazil) José Duarte	(Israel) Bnei Yehuda Tel Aviv
10	FW	(Brazil) Diego Barcelos	(Brazil) Sport Club Internacional
12	MF	(China) Zhang Si	(China) Beijing Institute of Technology FC
15	MF	(China) Ma Liang	Free agent
24	DF	(China) Wang Xiaoshi	(China) Wuhan Guanggu
25	MF	(China) Gao Ming	(China) Shandong Luneng
26	MF	(China) Wu Pingfeng	(China) Jiangsu Sainty
28	DF	(China) Bai Lei	(China) Xiamen Lanshi

=== Out ===
#	Pos	Player	To
8	MF	(China) Gao Ming	(China) Shandong Luneng (loan return)
10	FW	(Paraguay) Casiano	Retired
15	MF	(China) Ren Dazhong	Released
17	MF	(China) Luo Yong	(China) Guangzhou Pharmaceutical U19 team (Assistant coach)
19	DF	(China) Yang Xichang	Released
21	GK	(China) Zhang Yuntao	Released
24	DF	(China) He Wenyao	Released
25	MF	(China) Li Songhao	Released
26	DF	(Brazil) Clebão	(Brazil) São Carlos (loan return)
27	FW	(China) Ma Longchao	Released
31	MF	(China) Chen Liming	Released
32	GK	(China) Dong Shaonan	Released
33	MF	(China) Zhu Zhenhua	Released
34	MF	(China) Huang Jiafu	Released
35	FW	(Brazil) Jefferson	Released
38	DF	(China) Huang Baocheng	Released
39	FW	(China) Chen Qian	Released
40	DF	(China) Fan Zhirui	Released
41	DF	(China) Wang Jin	Released
42	FW	(China) Chen Fei	Released
	GK	(China) Li Wei	(China) Anhui Jiufang

=== Loan out ===
#	Pos	Player	To	Duration
––	DF	(China) Dai Xianrong	(China) Shenzhen Xiangxue Eisiti	2008 Season
––	FW	(China) Li Zhixing	(China) Shenzhen Xiangxue Eisiti	2008 Season
––	DF	(China) Zhang Jian	(China) Guangdong Sunray Cave	2008 season

== Match results ==
=== Pre-season and friendlies ===
Kick-off (GMT+8)	Opponents	H / A	Result	Scorers
2008-01-22	(China) Yantai Yiteng	N	0–0	
2008-01-23	(China) Changchun Yatai	N	0–1	
2008-01-24	(China) Wuhan Guanggu	N	0–0	
2008-01-25	(China) Zhejiang Greentown	N	0–1	
2008-01-26	(China) Wuhan Guanggu	N	2–1	
2008-01-28 15:30	(China) Liaoning Hongyun	N	1–1	
2008-01-30	(China) Shanghai Shenhua	N	2–0	
2008-01-31 15:30	(China) Shanghai Shenhua	N	1–1	Jiang Kun 5', Lu Lin 35'
2008-02-02	(China) Zhejiang Greentown	N	1–4	
2008-02-19	(China) Changchun Yatai	N	1–0	
2008-02-29	(China) Wuhan Guanggu	N	0–1	
2008-03-04 15:00	(China) Chongqing Lifan	N	0–0	
2008-03-05 15:00	(China) Chongqing Lifan	N	0–1	
2008-03-08 15:30	(Australia) Perth Glory FC	H	3–1	Xu Liang 3' (p), Perth Glory FC 19', Xu Liang 45', José Filho Duarte 62'
2008-03-24	(China) Jiangsu Sainty	H	2–2	
2008-04-16	(China) Guangdong Sunray Cave	H	3–1	
2008-07-23 20:00	(England) Chelsea FC	H	0–4	Salomon Kalou 21', Frank Lampard 50', Franco Di Santo 78', Shaun Wright-Phillips 88'
2008-08-11	(Hong Kong) TSW Pegasus FC	N	0–0	
2008-08-13	(Hong Kong) South China AA	N	3–1	
2008-08-21	(Hong Kong) Convoy Sun Hei SC	N	2–0	
2008-08-25 19:00	(Hong Kong) South China AA	H	1–1	Feng Junyan 1', Tales Schutz 88'
2008-08-26 16:00	(China) Guangdong Sunray Cave	H	4–3	Ramírez, Xu Liang(2), José Duarte / Ye Weichao(2), Cong Tianhao

=== Chinese Super League 2008 ===
Overall								Home						Away					
Pld	W	D	L	GF	GA	GD	Pts	W	D	L	GF	GA	GD	W	D	L	GF	GA	GD
30	10	10	10	41	42	−1	40	8	3	4	26	18	+8	2	7	6	15	24	−9

For table see Chinese Super League 2008 Final league table

Match won	Match drawn	Match lost	Biggest win	Biggest loss

Kick-off (GMT+8)	Opponents	H / A	Result	Scorers (opponents are indicated in italics)	Referee	Attendance	Pos
2008-03-30 15:30	Wuhan Guanggu	A	3 – 0^{1}	Luis Ramírez 4', Gustavo Saibt Martins 13' , Xu Liang 48', Luis Ramírez 91'	Fan Qi	18,000	2nd
2008-04-06 15:35	Shenzhen Xiangxue Eisiti	A	1 – 1	José Duarte 65', Yuan Lin 87',	Feng Wenqiang	10,000	2nd
2008-04-12 15:35	Shaanxi Chan-Ba	H	0 – 1	Zhou Lin 82'(OG)	Wan Daxue	20,000	6th
2008-07-16 19:30	Beijing Guoan	A	2 – 3	Sui Dongliang 42', Tiago 58', Xu Liang 65'(p), Tao Wei 77',Gao Ming 87'	Huang Junjie	20,000	12th
2008-04-27 15:35	Liaoning Hongyun	A	2 – 0	Luis Ramírez 21', Diego 29'	Huang Yejun	10,000	10th
2008-05-03 15:35	Changchun Yatai	H	3 – 2	Xu Liang 36', Diego 45',Guillaume Dah Zadi 70',José Duarte 74',Guillaume Dah Zadi 92'+	Wan Daxue	20,000	6th
2008-05-10 15:30	Dalian Haichang	H	3 – 0	Diego 15', Luis Ramírez 41', Wu Pingfeng 71'	Sun Baojie	22,000	3rd
2008-05-17 19:30^{2}	Zhejiang Greentown	H^{3}	1 – 3	Cai Chuchuan 49', Karim Benounes67', Cai Chuchuan 80',José Duarte 89'	Li Yuhong	20,000	6th
2008-09-06 15:35^{4}	Shanghai Shenhua	H	0 – 1	Emil Martínez 34'	Tan Hai	15,000	6th
2008-06-25 19:30	Tianjin Teda	A	0 – 2	Mariko Daouda 35', Éber Luís 51'	Huang Junjie	15,000	8th
2008-06-28 15:35	Qingdao Jonoon	H	3 – 2	Xu Liang 21', Lu Lin 27',Hu Jun 45', Qu Bo 53',Feng Junyan 96'+	Tao Rancheng	18,000	5th
2008-07-03 19:30	Changsha Ginde	A	2 – 4	Aboubakar Oumarou 17', Aboubakar Oumarou 48'+, Zhang Chenglin 51', Luis Ramírez 75',Yu Guijun 79', Tang Dechao 85'	Zhang Zhengping	8,000	8th
2008-07-06 19:30	Chengdu Blades	H	1 – 1	Xu Liang 51', Liu Cheng 93'+	Huang Junjie	22,000	8th
2008-07-12 19:30	Henan Construction	A	0 – 2	Qiao Wei 17', Josen 49'	Li Yunhong	25,000	11th
2008-08-30 15:35	Shandong Luneng	H	1 – 0	Luis Ramírez 64'	Zhang Lei	20,000	9th
2008-09-13 15:35	Wuhan Guanggu	H	3 – 0^{1}	Deng Zhuoxiang 4', Luis Ramírez 22', Luis Ramírez 34'	Tao Rancheng	21,000	6th
2008-09-20 15:35	Shenzhen Xiangxue Eisiti	H	1 – 0	Feng Junyan 54'	Zhang Lei	20,000	6th
2008-09-27 15:35	Shaanxi Chan-Ba	A	1 – 1	Wu Pingfeng 22', Ronny 37',	Wang Xueqing	11,000	6th
2008-10-02 15:35	Beijing Guoan	H	1 – 1	Walter Martínez 3', Diego 71',	Tao Rancheng	22,000	6th
2008-10-05 15:35	Liaoning Hongyun	H	1 – 2	Ryan Griffiths 9', Raman Kirenkin 79', Diego 87'	Li Yuhong	10,000	8th
2008-10-11 15:30	Changchun Yatai	A	0 – 6	Wang Dong 7', Guillaume Dah Zadi 26', Liu Weidong 31', Wang Dong 65', Samuel Caballero 84', Chen Lei 90'	Xu Hang	5,000	8th
2008-10-18 15:35	Dalian Haichang	A	1 – 1	Feng Junyan 12', Georgi Chilikov 91'+,	Fan Qi	4,000	9th
2008-10-22 19:30	Zhejiang Greentown	A	0 – 0		Wang Jin	7,894	9th
2008-10-26 19:45	Shanghai Shenhua	A	2 – 3	Luis Ramírez 18', Diego 36', Du Wei 41', Hamilton Ricard 51', Erick Scott 59'	Fan Qi	10,956	9th
2008-11-02 15:35	Tianjin Teda	H	4 – 3	Li Yan 13', Luis Ramírez 51',Éber Luís 77',Luis Ramírez 79', Lu Lin 85',Wu Weian 87'(p), Hao Junmin 92'+	Krishnan	18,000	9th
2008-11-09 15:30	Qingdao Jonoon	A	0 – 0		Zhang Lei	5,000	9th
2008-11-12 15:30	Changsha Ginde	H	0 – 0		Huang Junjie	21,000	9th
2008-11-16 15:30	Chengdu Blades	A	1 – 1	Shi Jun 76', Shi Jun 93'+(OG)	Wang Jin	5,000	9th
2008-11-23 15:30	Henan Construction	H	4 – 2	Emmanuel Olisadebe 10', Xu Liang 21', Luis Ramírez 35'(p), Bai Lei 67',Wang Shouting 81',Xu Liang 86'	Li Jun	25,360	8th
2008-11-30 15:30	Shandong Luneng	A	0 – 0		Li Yuhong	38,393	7th

- ^1 Wuhan Guanggu have withdrawn from the league. All matches were counted as 0–3 defeats.
- ^2 Match was postponed from 14 May to 17 May, for Wenchuan earthquake in Sichuan Province on 12 May.
- ^3 Match was moved from Hangzhou to Guangzhou for the time confliction with 2008 Summer Olympics torch relay in Hangzhou.
- ^4 Match was postponed from 18 May to 6 September.

== Squad statistics ==
No.	Pos.	Name	League		Discipline	
No.	Pos.	Name	Apps	Goals	Yellow card	Red card
1	GK	(China) Zhi Xinhua	0	0	0	0
2	DF	(China) Li Zhihai	9(4)	0	1	0
3	MF	(China) Li Yan	30	1	1	0
4	DF	(China) Zhou Lin	24(1)	0	4	0
5	DF	(Peru) Ismael Enrique Alvarado	29	0	1	0
6	MF	(China) Huang Zhiyi	0	0	0	0
7	MF	(China) Feng Junyan	16(9)	3	2	0
8	FW	(Brazil) José Filho Duarte	6(15)	3	1	0
9	FW	(Honduras) Luis Ramírez	26(2)	12	4	0
10	FW	(Brazil) Diego	23(2)	6	5	0
11	FW	(China) Wen Xiaoming	0(2)	0	0	0
12	GK	(China) Zhang Si	0(1)	0	0	0
13	DF	(China) Tang Dechao	5(8)	1	1	0
14	MF	(China) Cao Zhijie	0	0	0	0
15	MF	(China) Ma Liang	0(1)	0	0	0
16	MF	(China) Xu Deen	0(3)	0	0	0
17	MF	(China) Cai Yaohui	0	0	0	0
18	FW	(China) Yang Pengfeng	1(6)	0	0	0
19	DF	(China) Zhang Suozhi	0	0	0	0
20	MF	(China) Xu Liang	21(2)	7	7	0
21	MF	(China) Jia Wenpeng	9(6)	0	2	0
22	GK	(China) Li Shuai	30	0	3	0
23	MF	(China) Lu Lin	19(10)	2	2	0
24	DF	(China) Wang Xiaoshi	22(1)	0	4	0
25	MF	(China) Gao Ming	2(9)	1	1	0
26	MF	(China) Wu Pingfeng	28	2	3	0
27	MF	(China) Luo Xi	0	0	0	0
28	MF	(China) Bai Lei	30	1	2	0

== U19 Team ==
=== Technical staff ===
Name	Role
(China) Huang Hongtao	Manager
(China) Le Jingzhong	Assistant coach
(China) Huang Donghong	Assistant coach
(China) Luo Yong	Assistant coach

=== U19 League Results ===
Kick-off (GMT+8)	Opponents	H / A	Result
2008-04-07 16:10	Henan Construction U19s	A	1–2
2008-04-09 10:20	Shandong Luneng U19s	N	0–2
2008-04-11 16:10	Liaoning U19s	N	4–0
2008-04-13 10:15	Shaanxi Chan-ba U19s	N	1–1
2008-04-15 10:10	Changchun Yatai U19s	N	0–1
2008-04-17 16:10	Dalian Shide U17s	N	2–0
2008-04-19 10:10	Beijing FA U19s	N	0–6
2008-07-01 14:30	Beijing Guoan U19s	N	0–0
2008-07-03 10:20	Chengdu Blades U19s	N	2–2
2008-07-05 16:35	Jiangsu FA U19s	N	1–2
2008-07-07 14:35	Hebei FA U19s	N	1–3
2008-07-09 16:20	Wuhan Guanggu U19s	A	1–3
2008-07-11 14:25	Chongqing FA U19s	N	1–2
2008-07-13 16:25	Jiangxi FA U19s	N	0–2
2008-07-15 10:15	Zhejiang Greentown U19s	N	5–0

=== U19 League Table ===
P	Team	Pld	W	D	L	GF	GA	GD	Pts
1	Beijing Guoan U19s	15	9	5	1	26	8	18	32
2	Shaanxin Chan-ba U19s	15	9	4	2	28	17	11	31
3	Jiangsu FA U19s	15	8	4	3	23	17	6	28
–	–	–	–	–	–	–	–	–	–
13	Chongqing FA U19s	15	3	5	7	13	27	−14	14
14	Guangzhou Pharmaceutical U19s	15	3	3	9	19	26	-7	12
–	–	–	–	–	–	–	–	–	–
17	Dalian Shide U17s	15	0	4	11	14	39	−25	4

P = Position; Pld = Matches played; W = Matches won; D = Match(es) drawn; L = Match(es) lost; GF = Goals for; GA = Goals against; GD = Goal difference; Pts = Points;

=== U19 Winners' Cup ===
The competition was held from 12 October to 22 October in Changzhou, Jiangsu Province.

- Champions: Jiangsu FA U19s
- Runners-up: Hebei FA U19s
- 3rd place: Guangzhou Pharmaceutical U19s
