= 2009 Guangzhou Pharmaceutical F.C. season =

Guangzhou F.C. 2009
- Chairman: Li Chuyuan
- Manager: Shen Xiangfu
- Stadium: Yuexiushan Stadium
- Chinese Super League: 9th (Relegated)
- Top goalscorer: Luis Ramírez (17)
- Highest home attendance: 23,120 (v Qingdao Jonoon, 24 October)
- Lowest home attendance: 17,000 (v Shandong Luneng, 15 May)
- Average home league attendance: 20,054
Home colours	Away colours

The 2009 season is the 56th year in Guangzhou Football Club's existence, their 42nd season in the Chinese football league, also the 21st season in the top-flight, the second consecutive year. The club participated in the Chinese Super League. Although finished the ninth place of the league, Guangzhou Pharmaceutical relegated to China League One at the end of the season due to match fixing scandal.

== Kits and sponsors ==
The team kits for the 2009 season are produced by Nike. The title sponsor is Baiyunshan Pharmaceutical Co., Ltd. and the shirt sponsors are Zhongyi Pharmaceutical Co., Ltd. (front) and Baiyunshan Hutchison Whampoa Co., Ltd. (back).

Home kit	Away kit

== Technical staff ==
Position	Staff
Head coach	(China) Shen Xiangfu
Assistant coach	(China) Tang Pengju
Assistant coach	(China) Ren Jiaqing
Assistant coach	(China) Sun Chengyao
Goalkeeping coach	(Serbia) Edin
Fitness coach	(China) Ye Zhibin

== First-team squad ==
Note: Flags indicate national team as defined under FIFA eligibility rules; some limited exceptions apply. Players may hold more than one non-FIFA nationality.

No.	Pos.	Nation	Player
1	GK	CHN	Zhi Xinhua
2	DF	CHN	Li Zhihai (Captain)
3	MF	CHN	Li Yan
4	DF	CHN	Zhou Lin
5	DF	PER	Ismael Enrique Alvarado
6	MF	CHN	Huang Zhiyi
7	MF	CHN	Feng Junyan
8	MF	BRA	Diogo
9	FW	HON	Luis Ramírez
10	FW	BRA	Diego
11	MF	CHN	Li Benjian
12	GK	CHN	Zhang Si
13	FW	CHN	Tang Dechao
14	MF	CHN	Cao Zhijie
15	FW	CHN	Yang Yihu
16	MF	CHN	Xu Deen

No.	Pos.	Nation	Player
17	MF	CHN	Cai Yaohui
18	FW	CHN	Yang Bin
19	DF	CHN	Zhang Hongnan
20	MF	CHN	Xu Liang (Vice-captain)
21	GK	CHN	Tan Ning
22	GK	CHN	Li Shuai
23	MF	CHN	Lu Lin
24	DF	CHN	Wang Xiaoshi
25	MF	CHN	Li Jianhua
26	MF	CHN	Wu Pingfeng
27	MF	CHN	Li Bin
28	MF	CHN	Bai Lei
29	DF	CHN	Cui Wei
30	FW	CHN	Ni Bo (from July)
31	MF	CHN	Hu Zhaojun (from July)

== Transfers ==
=== In ===
#	Pos	Player	From
8	FW	(Brazil) Diogo	(Brazil) SC Internacional
25	MF	(China) Li Jianhua	(China) Shenzhen FC
30	FW	(China) Ni Bo	(China) Hubei Greenery
15	FW	(China) Yang Yihu	Youth team
18	FW	(China) Yang Bin	Youth team
19	DF	(China) Zhang Hongnan	Youth team
21	GK	(China) Tan Ning	(China) Nanjing Tiehu
27	MF	(China) Li Bin	Youth team

=== Loan in ===
#	Pos	Player	From	Duration
11	MF	(China) Li Benjian	(China) Tianjin Teda	2009 season
29	MF	(China) Cui Wei	(China) Changchun Yatai	2009 season
31	MF	(China) Hu Zhaojun	(China) Dalian Shide	16th game to 30th game

=== Out ===
#	Pos	Player	To
8	FW	(Brazil) José Filho Duarte	(China) Chongqing Lifan
––	FW	(China) Li Zhixing	(Hong Kong) TSW Pegasus
15	MF	(China) Ma Liang	Released
18	FW	(China) Yang Pengfeng	Retired
27	MF	(China) Luo Xi	Released
31	DF	(China) Dai Xianrong	Released
17	FW	(China) Wen Xiaoming	Retired
19	DF	(China) Zhang Suozhi	Retired
21	MF	(China) Jia Wenpeng	Retired
25	MF	(China) Gao Ming	Retired

=== Loan out ===
#	Pos	Player	To	Duration
––	DF	(China) Zhang Jian	(China) Guangdong Sunray Cave	2009 season

== Match results ==
=== Friendly matches ===
Pre–season
Kick-off (GMT+8)	Opponents	H / A	Result	Scorers
2009-02-21	(China) Nanchang Hengyuan	N	3–1	Luis Ramírez, Diogo, Yang Yihu
2009-02-22	(China) Shaanxi Chanba	N	2–0	Luis Ramírez, Lu Lin
2009-02-23	(China) Shanghai Shenhua	A	0–0	
2009-02-24	(China) Hangzhou Greentown	N	0–0	
2009-02-25	(China) Shanghai East Asia	A	3–2	Diego (2), Huang Zhiyi
2009-02-26	(China) Nanjing Yoyo	N	3–2	Xu Liang (2), Wu Pingfeng
2009-03-02 15:30	(China) Hangzhou Greentown	H	3 – 1	Diego 65' & 70', Diogo 73'
2009-03-04 15:30	(China) Changsha Ginde	H	2 – 1	Tang Dechao 61' & 73'
2009-03-06 15:30	(China) Guangdong Sunray Cave	H	1 – 0	Feng Junyan 16'

Summer break
Kick-off (GMT+8)	Opponents	H / A	Result	Scorers	Referee
2009-06-05 19:45	(Australia) Melbourne Victory	H	2 – 1	Li Yan 33', Lu Lin 66', Broxham 89'	(China) Song Wenfeng
2009-06-16 15:30	(China) Guangdong Sunray Cave	H	2–1	Diego, Tang Dechao	
2009-07-21 19:40	(New Zealand) Wellington Phoenix	N	3 – 2	Tang Dechao 31',Greenacre 57',Hu Zhaojun 62,Barbarouses 82,Xu Liang 89'	(China) Li Bo
2009-08-13 16:00	(Hong Kong) Wofoo Tai Po	H	1–2	Lu Lin	
2009-08-15 16:00	(Hong Kong) Wofoo Tai Po	H	4–1	Diego, Diogo, Ramírez, Lu Lin	
2009-09-07 16:00	(Hong Kong) Shatin SA	H	2–1	Li Yan (2)	

=== Chinese Super League ===
Overall								Home						Away					
Pld	W	D	L	GF	GA	GD	Pts	W	D	L	GF	GA	GD	W	D	L	GF	GA	GD
30	9	10	11	38	38	0	37	8	6	1	27	12	+15	1	4	10	11	26	−15

Match won	Match drawn	Match lost	Biggest win	Biggest loss

Kick-off (GMT+8)	Opponents	H / A	Result	Scorers (opponents are indicated in italics)	Referee	Attendance	Pos
2009-03-21 19:30	Henan Construction	A	1 – 2	Leandro Netto 22', Bai Lei 54', Emmanuel Olisadebe 59'	Tan Hai	23,239	11th
2009-03-28 15:30	Shenzhen Asia Travel	A	2 – 1	Li Zhihai 42', Mouchid 62', Xu Liang 89'	Zhang Lei	16,000	6th
2009-04-06 16:00	Dalian Shide	H	3 – 1	Xu Liang 29' (p), Zhu Ting 45', Xu Liang 52' (p), 67'	Sun Baojie	20,000	4th
2009-04-11 19:30	Hangzhou Greentown	A	2 – 3	Valdo 24', Diego 55', Ma Cheng 67', 79', Luis Ramírez 80'	Tan Hai	14,656	7th
2009-04-18 19:30	Chongqing Lifan	H	3 – 1	José Duarte 19', Xu Liang 43', Luis Ramírez 75', Tang Dechao 80'	Fan Qi	18,000	4th
2009-04-25 15:30	Changsha Ginde	A	0 – 0		Tao Rancheng	7,532	6th
2009-05-02 15:30	Jiangsu Sainty	H	1 – 0	Xu Liang 84' (p)	Li Yuhong	22,600	4th
2009-05-09 15:30	Chengdu Blades	A	1 – 2	Wang Song 10', Rodrigues 51', Luis Ramírez 75'	Wan Daxue	10,000	6th
2009-05-15 15:30	Shandong Luneng	H	1 – 1	Luis Ramírez 4', Han Peng 47'	Zhang Lei	17,000	6th
2009-05-24 15:30	Shaanxi Chan-Ba	A	1 – 4	Li Yan 39', Wan Houliang 81', Wang Peng 85', Wang Yun 90',Luis Ramírez 91'+	Wan Daxue	21,400	8th
2009-06-13 19:30	Shanghai Shenhua	H	2 – 1	Luis Ramírez 21',Yu Tao 46'+,Xu Liang 55'	Fan Qi	21,000	4th
2009-06-20 19:30	Changchun Yatai	A	0 – 2	Liu Xiaodong 11', Li Zhihai 22' (OG)	Tao Rancheng	11,000	6th
2009-06-28 15:30	Beijing Guoan	H	1 – 1	Yan xiangchuang 42',Xu Liang 65' (p)	Zhang Zhengping	21,680	9th
2009-07-02 19:30	Qingdao Jonoon	A	0 – 0		Wang Jin	6,000	9th
2009-07-05 15:30	Tianjin Teda	H	1 – 1	Diogo 40',Ma Leilei 53'	Zhang Lei	21,160	11th
2009-08-02 15:30	Henan Construction	H	2 – 0	Diego 60', Luis Ramírez 86'	Xu Fuxin	22,160	7th
2009-08-08 15:30	Shenzhen Asia Travel	H	6 – 1	Luis Ramírez 25', Wu Pingfeng 28', Diego 33', Feng Junyan 61',Hernán Barcos 65' (p),Diogo 81', Luis Ramírez 85'	Rosdi Shaharul (Malaysia)	22,000	5th
2009-08-22 19:00	Dalian Shide	A	0 – 0		Li Jun	14,000	4th
2009-08-26 15:30	Hangzhou Greentown	H	2 – 0	Xu Liang 38', Wu Pingfeng 51'	Zhou Chuan	18,900	4th
2009-08-30 19:30	Chongqing Lifan	A	0 – 1	José Duarte 75'	Huang Junjie	8,000	6th
2009-09-05 15:30	Changsha Ginde	H	2 – 1	Luis Ramírez 8',71'(p), Liu Jianye 84'	Huang Yejun	21,000	6th
2009-09-12 19:30	Jiangsu Sainty	A	1 – 3	Wang Yang 9', Lu Bofei 48', Li Jianhua 62'(OG),Luis Ramírez 77'(p)	Huang Junjie	13,000	6th
2009-09-16 15:30	Chengdu Blades	H	1 – 2	Luis Ramírez 64'(p),Brendon Šantalab 74'(p),84'	Tan Hai		7th
2009-09-20 19:30	Shandong Luneng	A	1 – 1	Alejandro Cichero 21', Luis Ramírez 68'	Wan Daxue	15,367	8th
2009-09-26 15:30	Shaanxi Chan-Ba	H	1 – 1	Xu Liang 70',Yu Hai 75'	Li Jun	22,000	8th
2009-10-05 19:30	Shanghai Shenhua	A	1 – 3	Sun Xiang 12',53' , Luis Ramírez 62',Aleksander Rodić 82'	Zhou Gang		10th
2009-10-10 15:30	Changchun Yatai	H	1 – 1	Ricardo Steer 30',Luis Ramírez 83'	Wang Jin	18,500	9th
2009-10-17 15:30	Beijing Guoan	A	0 – 2	Ryan Griffiths 14',89'	Tao Rancheng	36,500	10th
2009-10-24 15:30	Qingdao Jonoon	H	0 – 0		Huang Junjie	23,120	8th
2009-10-31 15:30	Tianjin Teda	A	1 – 2	Han Yanming 28' , Luis Ramírez 60(p)',Cao Yang 83(p)'	Tao Rancheng	8,000	9th

== League table ==
Pos	Team	Pld	W	D	L	GF	GA	GD	Pts	Qualification or relegation
7	Chengdu Blades (R)	30	11	6	13	32	39	−7	39 (Note: Chengdu Blades were relegated after being found guilty of match-fixing on February 23, 2010.)	Relegation to China League One
8	Dalian Shide	30	10	8	12	27	31	−4	38	
9	Guangzhou GPC (R)	30	9	10	11	38	38	0	37 (Note: Guangzhou: 10 pts, 12–10; Jiangsu: 8 pts, 6–7; Shenzhen: 8 pts, 8–10; Shaanxi: 6 pts, 9–8. Guangzhou were relegated after being found guilty of match-fixing on February 23, 2010.)	Relegation to China League One
10	Jiangsu Sainty	30	9	10	11	30	30	0	37 (Note: Guangzhou: 10 pts, 12–10; Jiangsu: 8 pts, 6–7; Shenzhen: 8 pts, 8–10; Shaanxi: 6 pts, 9–8)	
11	Shenzhen Asia Travel	30	10	10	10	36	40	−4	37 (Note: Guangzhou: 10 pts, 12–10; Jiangsu: 8 pts, 6–7; Shenzhen: 8 pts, 8–10; Shaanxi: 6 pts, 9–8. Shenzhen were docked 3 points for wearing the wrong kits for a home match against Shanghai and causing a one-hour delay of the match on 30 Aug 2009.)	

Source: 2009 league table on the official site of the Chinese Super League
Rules for classification: 1st points; 2nd head-to-head points; 3rd head-to-head goal difference; 4th head-to-head goals scored; 5th goal difference; 6th goals scored; 7th disciplinary points (1 point for each yellow card, 3 points for each red card). Head-to-Head: used when head-to-head record is used to rank tied teams.
(R) Relegated

== Squad stats ==
Updated to games played on 31 October 2009.
To see the table ordered by certain column title click that column header icon once or twice.

Player	Pos	Apps	Starts	Goals	(yellow card) YC	(yellow card) (red card) SYC
(Honduras) Luis Ramírez	FW	30	30	17	1	0
(China) Xu Liang	MF	23	23	10	7	1
(Brazil) Diego	FW	26	25	3	5	0
(China) Wu Pingfeng	MF	27	20	2	5	0
(Brazil) Diogo	MF	19	9	2	2	0
(China) Feng Junyan	MF	27	25	1	5	1
(China) Bai Lei	MF	20	19	1	3	0
(China) Li Zhihai	DF	13	11	1	3	0
(China) Tang Dechao	FW	7	0	1	1	0
(China) Li Shuai	GK	29	29	0	0	0
(China) Li Jianhua	MF	28	21	0	0	0
(China) Li Yan	MF	26	18	0	2	0
(Peru) Ismael Alvarado	DF	25	24	0	1	0
(China) Li Benjian	MF	24	18	0	2	0
(China) Zhou Lin	DF	17	15	0	5	0
(China) Cui Wei	DF	16	11	0	1	0
(China) Lu Lin	MF	15	6	0	1	0
(China) Hu Zhaojun	MF	13	11	0	1	1
(China) Huang Zhiyi	DF	13	6	0	1	0
(China) Wang Xiaoshi	DF	9	7	0	1	0
(China) Cao Zhijie	MF	1	1	0	0	0
(China) Zhang Si	GK	1	1	0	0	0
(China) Xu Deen	MF	1	0	0	0	0
Total	––	––	––	38	47	3

No appearances player not listed.

== Youth teams ==
=== U19s ===
Kick-off (GMT+8)	Opponents	H / A	Result
2009-04-08 09:00	Yanbian U19s	N	1–0
2009-04-10	Qingdao Jonoon U19s	N	TBC
2009-04-12 14:30	Beijing Guoan U19s	N	0–0
2009-04-14 14:30	Shandong FA U19s	A	1–4
2009-04-16	Changsha Ginde U19s	N	TBC
2009-04-18 14:30	Tianjin Teda U19s	N	1–1
2009-04-20 14:30	Shandong Luneng U19s	A	1–1
2009-07-11 8:30	Changchun Yatai U19s	N	0–1
2009-07-13 16:00	Hubei FA U19s	N	3–1
2009-07-14 10:15	Qingdao Hailifeng U19s	N	2–3
2009-07-16 10:15	Tianjin Tanggu U19s	N	4–1

For table see 2009 Chinese U–19 League table
