= 30th Guangdong–Hong Kong Cup =

Guangdong–Hong Kong Cup of 2007–08 was the 30th staging of this two-leg competition between Hong Kong and Guangdong.

The first leg was played in Hong Kong on 30 December 2007 and the second leg was played in Guangzhou on 6 January 2008.

Hong Kong captured the trophy by winning an aggregate 4–0.

== Squads ==
=== Hong Kong ===
- Head of Delegation: Timothy Fok 霍震霆, Brian Leung 梁孔德, Pui Kwan Kay 貝鈞奇
- Deputy Head of Delegation: Allen Lee 李鵬飛, Lawrence Yu 余锦基, Bruce Mok 莫邦棟, Lam Kin Ming 林建名, Koon Wing Yee 官永義, Ken Ng 伍健, Chau How Chen 周厚澄
- Team manager: Lo Kit Sing 羅傑承, Chow Man Leung 周文亮
- Administrative Manager: Tsang Wai Chung 曾偉忠, Lee Yun Wah 李潤華
- Coach: (Portugal) Jose Luis 路爾斯
- Coach Assistant: (Brazil) Rambo Jose Ricardo 列卡度
- Assistant coach: Lo Kai Wah 羅繼華, Lee Kin Wo 李健和
- Fitness coach: Chan Hiu Ming 陳曉明
- Goalkeeper coach: Liu Chun Fai 廖俊輝
- Physio: Lui Yat Hong 呂日康
- Team Assistant: Kwan Kon Sang 關幹生

No.	Pos.	Player	Date of birth (age)	Caps	Club
1	GK	(Brazil) Luciano 盧斯奧	10 April 1974 (age 33)		(Hong Kong) Eastern
2	DF	(Hong Kong) Lee Chi Ho 李志豪	16 November 1982 (age 25)		(Hong Kong) South China
4	DF	(Ghana) Fofo 科夫	25 June 1979 (age 28)		(Hong Kong) Bulova Rangers
5	MF	(Brazil) Edgar Aldrighi Junior 祖利亞	30 March 1974 (age 33)		(Hong Kong) Wofoo Tai Po
6	DF	(Ghana) Festus Baise 法圖斯	11 April 1980 (age 27)		(Hong Kong) Citizen
7	FW	(North Macedonia) Goran Stankovski 哥倫	20 November 1976 (age 31)		(Hong Kong) Kitchee
9	FW	(China) Wang Xuanhong 王選宏	24 July 1989 (age 18)		(Hong Kong) Citizen
11	MF	(China) Li Haiqiang 李海強 (captain)	3 May 1977 (age 30)		(Hong Kong) South China
15	DF	(Hong Kong) Chan Wai Ho 陳偉豪	24 April 1982 (age 25)		(Hong Kong) South China
17	GK	(Brazil) Oliveira 奧利華拉	12 October 1975 (age 32)		(Hong Kong) Happy Valley
18	FW	(Hong Kong) Chan Siu Ki 陳肇麒	14 July 1985 (age 22)		(Hong Kong) Kitchee
20	DF	(Hong Kong) Poon Yiu Cheuk 潘耀焯	19 September 1977 (age 30)		(Hong Kong) Happy Valley
21	MF	(Hong Kong) Man Pei Tak 文彼得	16 February 1982 (age 25)		(Hong Kong) South China
22	FW	(Brazil) Giovane 基奧雲尼	25 November 1982 (age 25)		(Hong Kong) Convoy Sun Hei
25	DF	(Togo) Cris 基斯	9 October 1980 (age 27)		(Hong Kong) South China
26	MF	(Brazil) Itaparica 伊達	8 July 1980 (age 27)		(Hong Kong) South China
27	FW	(Brazil) Maxwell 麥士維	23 April 1979 (age 28)		(Hong Kong) South China
30	FW	(Brazil) Detinho 迪天奴	11 September 1973 (age 34)		(Hong Kong) South China

=== Guangdong ===
Head of Delegation:
Zhao Shaoming 招少鳴
Secretary:
Zheng Junhui 鄭俊輝
Team Managers:
Ke Guohong 柯國洪, Kong Maosheng 孔茂勝, Ning ZhiXiong 寧智雄
Head coach:
Shen Xiangfu 沈祥福
Assistant coach:
Ye Zhibin 葉志彬, 艾丁
Physio
Mai Zhiyuan 麥志垣
Translator:
Yang Lei 楊磊

No.	Pos.	Player	Date of birth (age)	Caps	Club
1	GK	Zhi Xinhua 支鑫华			(China) Guangzhou Pharm. 广州医药
2	DF	Li Zhihai 李志海 (captain)			(China) Guangzhou Pharm. 广州医药
3	MF	Li Yan 李岩			(China) Guangzhou Pharm. 广州医药
4	DF	Zhou Lin 周麟			(China) Guangzhou Pharm. 广州医药
5	FW	Wang Xiaoshi 王小詩			(China) Guangzhou Pharm. 广州医药
6	MF	Jia Wenpeng 賈文鵬			(China) Guangzhou Pharm. 广州医药
7	MF	Feng Junyan 冯俊彦			(China) Guangzhou Pharm. 广州医药
8	FW	Gao Ming 高明			(China) Guangzhou Pharm. 广州医药
11	MF	Lu Lin 卢琳			(China) Guangzhou Pharm. 广州医药
12	GK	Li Shuai 李帅			(China) Guangzhou Pharm. 广州医药
13	DF	Tang Dechao 唐德超			(China) Guangzhou Pharm. 广州医药
14	DF	Cao Zhijie 曹志杰			(China) Guangzhou Pharm. 广州医药
15	FW	Luo Xi 羅西			(China) Guangzhou Pharm. 广州医药
16	FW	Xu Deen 徐德恩			(China) Guangzhou Pharm. 广州医药
17	MF	Cai Yaohui 蔡尧辉			(China) Guangzhou Pharm. 广州医药
18	MF	Yang Pengfeng 杨朋锋			(China) Guangzhou Pharm. 广州医药
19	DF	Zhang Suozhi 张所智			(China) Guangzhou Pharm. 广州医药
20	MF	Xu Liang 徐亮			(China) Guangzhou Pharm. 广州医药

== Fixtures ==
First Leg

30 December 2007
15:00

Hong Kong	3–0	Guangdong
Detinho 27' 84'; Maxwell 39'	(in chinese)

Hong Kong Stadium, Hong Kong
Attendance: 3,516
Referee: Ng Chiu Kok

Second Leg

6 January 2008
15:00

Guangdong	0–1	Hong Kong
	(in chinese)	Itaparica 69'

Century Lotus Stadium, Foshan, China

== Trivia ==
- It was the first time in the competition history that Hong Kong was able to beat Guangdong in both legs.
- 4–0 was the biggest aggregate win for Hong Kong in the competition.
- The 3–0 win in the first leg was the biggest win for Hong Kong in a single match in the competition.
- It was the first time in the competition history that no Chinese players were able to score for both teams.
- All 4 goals were scored by 3 Brazilian players from Hong Kong League XI and they all played for Hong Kong First Division League team South China.
- The 3 scoring players wore the jerseys with the largest numbers in the team.

== See also ==
- Guangdong-Hong Kong Cup
- Hong Kong First Division League 2007-08
- Hong Kong Senior Shield 2007-08
- Hong Kong League Cup 2007-08
- Hong Kong FA Cup 2007-08
