= 28th Guangdong–Hong Kong Cup =

Guangdong-Hong Kong Cup 2005–06 is the 28th staging of this two-leg competition between Hong Kong and Guangdong.

The first leg was played in Mong Kok Stadium in Hong Kong on 31 December 2005 while the second leg was played in Guangzhou on 8 January 2006.

Guangdong captured champion by winning an aggregate 2–1 against Hong Kong.

== Squads ==
=== Hong Kong ===
The team consists of 18 players:

No.	Pos.	Player	Date of birth (age)	Caps	Club
2	DF	(Hong Kong) Lee Chi Ho	16 November 1982 (age 23)		(Hong Kong) South China
3	MF	(Hong Kong) Man Pei Tak	16 February 1982 (age 23)		(Hong Kong) Buler Rangers
4	DF	(Hong Kong) Sham Kwok Fai	30 May 1984 (age 23)		(Hong Kong) Happy Valley
5	DF	(Hong Kong) Lee Wai Lun	7 March 1981 (age 24)		(Hong Kong) Xiangxue Sun Hei
7	FW	(Hong Kong) Chu Siu Kei	11 January 1980 (age 25)		(Hong Kong) Xiangxue Sun Hei
8	MF	(Hong Kong) Cheung Sai Ho	27 August 1975 (age 30)		(Hong Kong) Happy Valley
9	FW	(Hong Kong) Chan Siu Ki	14 July 1985 (age 20)		(Hong Kong) Kitchee
12	FW	(Hong Kong) Sham Kwok Keung	10 September 1985 (age 20)		(Hong Kong) Happy Valley
14	MF	(Hong Kong) Lo Chi Kwan	18 August 1981 (age 24)		(Hong Kong) Xiangxue Sun Hei
15	DF	(Hong Kong) Chan Wai Ho	24 April 1982 (age 23)		(Hong Kong) Buler Rangers
16	MF	(Hong Kong) Liu Quankun	17 February 1985 (age 20)		(Hong Kong)
18	MF	(Hong Kong) Lee Wai Man (Captain)	1 August 1973 (age 32)		(Hong Kong) Happy Valley
19	GK	(Hong Kong) Fan Chun Yip	1 May 1976 (age 29)		(Hong Kong) Happy Valley
20	DF	(Hong Kong) Poon Yiu Cheuk	19 September 1977 (age 28)		(Hong Kong) Happy Valley
21	FW	(Hong Kong) Chan Ho Man	14 May 1980 (age 25)		(Hong Kong) Xiangxue Sun Hei
22	GK	(Hong Kong) Chan Ka Ki	25 April 1979 (age 26)		(Hong Kong) Xiangxue Sun Hei
23	DF	(Hong Kong) Gerard	21 September 1978 (age 27)		(Hong Kong) Happy Valley
27	MF	(Hong Kong) Wong Chun Yue	28 January 1978 (age 27)		(Hong Kong) South China

=== Guangdong ===
- Manager: (Croatia) Drago Mamić

No.	Pos.	Player	Date of birth (age)	Caps	Club
18	GK	(China) Li Wei 李偉			(China) Guangzhou Pharm. 广州医药
2	DF	(China) Li Zhihai 李志海			(China) Guangzhou Pharm. 广州医药
5	DF	(China) Dai Xianrong 戴憲榮 (Captain)			(China) Guangzhou Pharm. 广州医药
8	MF	(China) Cao Zhijie 曹志杰			(China) Guangzhou Pharm. 广州医药
11	FW	(China) Wen Xiaoming 溫小明			(China) Guangzhou Pharm. 广州医药
14	MF	(China) Liang Jinwen 梁敬文			(China) Guangzhou Pharm. 广州医药
22		(China) Hu Jiajian 胡嘉健			(China) Guangzhou Pharm. 广州医药
29	DF	(China) Tang Dechao 唐德超			(China) Guangzhou Pharm. 广州医药
30	DF	(China) Liu Yibing 劉軼冰			(China) Guangzhou Pharm. 广州医药
31	MF	(China) Zou You 鄒遊			(China) Guangzhou Pharm. 广州医药
32	FW	(China) Liu Xiaofeng 劉曉峰			(China) Guangzhou Pharm. 广州医药
21	GK	(China) Zhang Yuntao 张云涛			(China) Guangzhou Pharm. 广州医药
3	MF	(China) Li Yan 李岩			(China) Guangzhou Pharm. 广州医药
7	MF	(China) Feng Junyan 冯俊彦			(China) Guangzhou Pharm. 广州医药
10	FW	(China) Du Zhiqiang 杜志強			(China) Guangzhou Pharm. 广州医药
17	MF	(China) Luo Yong 罗勇			(China) Guangzhou Pharm. 广州医药
19	DF	(China) Yang Xichuan 杨熙昌			(China) Guangzhou Pharm. 广州医药
33	DF	(China) Guo Liang 郭亮			(China) Guangzhou Pharm. 广州医药

== Fixtures ==
First Leg

31 December 2005
15:00

Hong Kong	1-0	Guangdong
Poon Yiu Cheuk 65' (PEN.); Sham Kwok Keung (yellow card) 78'; Chu Siu Kei (yellow card) 83'	(in chinese)	Li Zhihai (yellow card) 36'; Wen Xiaoming (yellow card) 64'; Tang Dechao (yellow card) 48' (yellow-red card) 64'; Li Yan (yellow card) 77'

Mong Kok Stadium
Attendance: 2,611

Second Leg

8 January 2006
15:00

Guangdong	2-0	Hong Kong
Li Zhihai 36'; Wen Xiaoming 82'	(in chinese)	Liu Quankun (yellow card) 26'; Chan Wai Ho (yellow card) 65'

Guangdong Provincial People's Stadium, Guangzhou
