= 2003 Guangzhou F.C. season =

Guangzhou F.C. 2003
- Manager: (China) Mai Chao
- Stadium: Yuexiushan Stadium
- Jia-B League: 3rd
- FA Cup: First Round

The 2003 season is the 52nd year in Guangzhou Football Club's existence, their 38th season in the Chinese football league and the 12th season in the professional football league.

Guangzhou finished third in the Jia-B League table.

== First-team squad ==
=== Players ===
Note: Flags indicate national team as defined under FIFA eligibility rules; some limited exceptions apply. Players may hold more than one non-FIFA nationality.

No.	Pos.	Nation	Player
1	GK	CHN	Zhou Zhanhong
2	-]	CHN	Liu Zhiqiang
3	MF	CHN	Ye Zhibin
4	DF	CHN	Li Zhihai
6	MF	CHN	Huang Zhiyi
7	FW	CHN	Liang Zicheng
8	-	CHN	Li Zifei
9	FW	ANG	Joaquim Alberto Silva
10	MF	BRA	Adriano
11	FW	CHN	Wen Xiaoming
12	-	CHN	Liu Xing
13	MF	CHN	Huo Rining
14	-	CHN	Liang Jingwen
15	-	CHN	Guo Hao
17	-	CHN	Luo Yong
18	GK	CHN	Han Feng
19	-	CHN	Bao Wen
20	DF	CHN	Liu Yibing

No.	Pos.	Nation	Player
21	DF	HKG	Ng Wai Chiu
22	FW	TTO	Gary Glasgow
23	-	CHN	Li Jianqiang
24	-	CHN	Wu Yuhua
25	-	CHN	Zhang Liang
26	DF	CHN	Dai Xianrong
27	-	CHN	Liang Xiang
29	-	CHN	Chen Yuping
31	-	CHN	Yu Dequan
32	-	CHN	Lu Xiaoxuan
33	-	CHN	Zhang Yuntao
34	-	CHN	Hu Jiajian
35	MF	CHN	Cao Zhijie
36	-	CHN	Yang Xichang
37	MF	CHN	Feng Junyan
38	-	CHN	Liang Ximing
40	GK	CHN	Huang Hongtao
