= 26th Guangdong–Hong Kong Cup =

Guangdong-Hong Kong Cup 2003–04 is the 26th staging of this two-leg competition between Hong Kong and Guangdong.

The first leg was played in Hong Kong Stadium while the second leg was played in Guangzhou.

Hong Kong captured champion again by winning an aggregate 2–1 against Guangdong.

== Squads ==
=== Hong Kong ===
Some of the players in the squad include:

- (Hong Kong) Lawrence Chimezie Akandu 羅倫士
- (Hong Kong) Cheung Sai Ho 蔣世豪
- (Hong Kong) Law Chun Bong 羅振邦
- (Hong Kong) Poon Yiu Cheuk 潘耀焯

=== Guangdong ===
The team was formed mainly by players from Jia B League 2003 third-placed team Guangzhou Xiangxue. The rest of the team include a few players from Guangzhou Kejian and Tan Ende from Zhejiang Lücheng. Some of the players in the squad include:

- (China) Chen Qian 陳謙
- (China) Dai Xianrong 戴憲榮
- (China) Feng Junyan 馮俊彥
- (China) Huang Zhiyi 黃志毅
- (China) Li Zhihai 李志海
- (China) Li Zhixing 黎智星
- (China) Li Zifei 黎梓菲
- (China) Liang Jingwen 梁敬文
- (China) Liang Shiming 梁仕銘
- (China) Luo Yong 羅勇
- (China) Tan Ende 譚恩德
- (China) Wen Xiaoming 溫小明
- (China) Yang Xichang 楊熙昌
- (China) Yang Zhi 楊智
- (China) Ye Zhibin 葉志彬
- (China) Zhang Yuntao 張雲濤

== Results ==
First Leg

28 December 2003

| Hong Kong | 2-1 | Guangdong |
|---|---|---|
| Law Chun Bong 27'; Poon Yiu Cheuk 43' (pen.) | | Li Zhihai (yellow card) 42' (yellow-red card) 54'; Huang Zhiyi 90+3' |

Hong Kong Stadium

Second Leg

4 January 2004

| Guangdong | 0-0 | Hong Kong |

Guangdong Provincial People's Stadium, Guangzhou

== Trivia ==
- It was the first time in 13 thirteen years that Hong Kong was able to capture the champion with a team without any foreign players.
