= 2005 Guangzhou F.C. season =

Guangzhou F.C. 2005
- Manager: (China) Mai Chao
- Stadium: Yuexiushan Stadium
- China League One: 3rd
- FA Cup: Round of 16

The 2005 season is the 54th year in Guangzhou Football Club's existence, their 40th season in the Chinese football league and the 14th season in the professional football league. They Finished 3rd in the China League One.

== Competitions ==
=== Chinese FA Cup ===
==== Matches ====
| 26 March First round | Guangzhou Sunray Cave | 2–0 | Changchun City Evening News Yatai | Yiyang |
| 15:00 UTC+8 | Wen Xiaoming 22'; Li Haifeng 90' | | | Stadium: Yiyang Stadium |

| 18 June Second round First leg | Guangzhou Sunray Cave | 1–2 | Shandong Luneng Taishan | Tianhe Stadium, Guangzhou |
| 16:10 UTC+8 | Luo Yong 65' (pen.) | | Shu Chang 33'; Han Peng 68' |

| 26 June Second round Second leg | Shandong Luneng Taishan | 5–2 (7–3 agg.) | Guangzhou Sunray Cave | Shandong Provincial Stadium, Jinan |
| 19:30UTC+8 | Dănciulescu 40'; Han Peng 55'; Li Jinyu 63', 85'; Zheng Zhi 88' | | Tang Dechao 18'; Liang Shiming 27' |
