= Tan Ning =

Tan Ning may refer to the following Chinese people:

- Tan Ning (badminton) (born 2003)
- Tan Ning (footballer) (born 1990)
