= Qin Sheng =

Chinese footballer

Qin Sheng 秦升
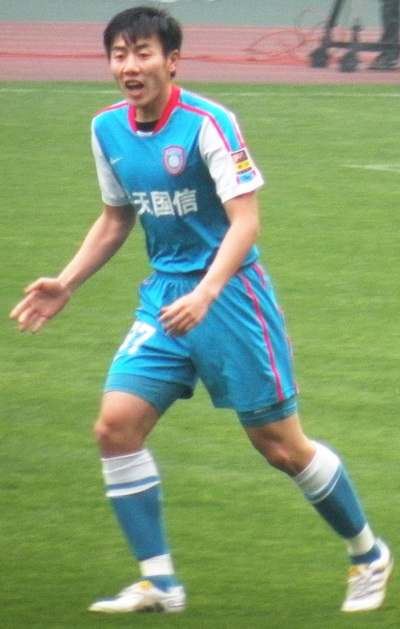
- Qin with Jiangsu Sainty in 2010

Personal information
- Full name: Qin Sheng
- Date of birth: 2 November 1986 (age 40)
- Place of birth: Dalian, Liaoning, China
- Height: 1.86 m (6 ft 1 in)
- Position: Midfielder

Youth career
- 1999–2004: Shandong Luneng

Senior career*
| Years | Team | Apps | (Gls) |
| 2005–2008 | Qingdao Jonoon | 45 | (0) |
| 2008–2010 | Jiangsu Sainty | 58 | (2) |
| 2011 | Liaoning Whowin | 28 | (0) |
| 2012–2014 | Guangzhou Evergrande | 35 | (1) |
| 2014 | Meizhou Hakka | 13 | (5) |
| 2015 | Liaoning Whowin | 24 | (1) |
| 2016–2018 | Shanghai Shenhua | 41 | (0) |
| 2018 | → Dalian Yifang (loan) | 13 | (0) |
| 2019 | Dalian Yifang | 21 | (1) |
| 2020–2022 | Shanghai Shenhua | 21 | (0) |
| Total | | 299 | (10) |

International career
| 2012–2013 | China | 10 | (0) |
- * Club domestic league appearances and goals

Qin Sheng (simplified Chinese: 秦升; traditional Chinese: 秦昇; pinyin: Qín Shēng; born 2 November 1986 in Dalian) is a Chinese former footballer who played as midfielder.

== Club career ==
=== Qingdao Jonoon ===
While Qin Sheng was born and raised in Dalian, he would move to Shandong in 1999 to play for the various Shandong Luneng youth teams. After rising through the club's various youth teams, Qin could not break into the senior team and did not make any senior level appearance for Shandong Luneng. At the beginning of the 2005 season, Qin joined top-tier side Qingdao Jonoon as part of a deal that saw Shandong Luneng buy Gao Ming from Qingdao Jonoon. At Qingdao, he was given his chance to break into the senior team and made his league debut against Shanghai Shenhua on 2 April 2005 in a 2–0 defeat where he came on as a second-half substitute. At Qingdao, he would gradually start to establish himself as a regular within the team until the 2007 season when he had a dispute with the manager Yin Tiesheng after a 2–1 defeat against Changchun Yatai on 7 April 2007 and lost favor in the team. The following season, Qin was given another chance within the team when his former Shandong youth manager Guo Kanfeng came in to coach the team, however Qin was unable to take this chance and only played in eight league games throughout the league campaign.

=== Jiangsu Sainty ===
In September 2008, Qin transferred to second-tier club Jiangsu Sainty for a fee of ¥1 million and would go on to make his debut against Chongqing Lifan on 27 September 2008 in a 2–1 victory where he came on as substitute. Throughout the league campaign, Qin would gain significant playing time and go on to score his first goal on 31 October 2008 against Shanghai East Asia in a 4–1 victory. By the end of the season, Qin would have played in seven league games and scored one goal as Jiangsu won the division title and promotion to the top tier.

=== Liaoning Whowin ===
Qin moved to Liaoning Whowin on a free transfer in January 2011. Qin played one season at the club and had a decent 2011 season, playing 28 games and scoring no goals during his time with Liaoning.

=== Guangzhou Evergrande ===
Qin transferred to Guangzhou Evergrande on 10 January 2012. On 3 February 2012, he scored his first goal for Guangzhou in a 1–0 preseason victory against CSKA Moscow in the 2012 Marbella Cup. On 25 February 2012, he made his official debut for Guangzhou in the 2–1 Chinese Super Cup victory against Tianjin Teda, coming on as a substitute for Zhao Xuri in 59th minute. Qin made his league debut in the third round of the season in a 3–0 home win against Henan Construction on 25 March 2012 and scored his first league goal for Guangzhou in his seventh league appearance on 11 May 2012 in a 3–1 away defeat against Dalian Shide.

Qin was sent to the reserves after falling out with the team manager Marcello Lippi at the beginning of the 2014 season, after he had an argument with a member of the coaching staff, which Lippi viewed as unprofessional. He was released by Guangzhou and signed a half-year contract with China League Two side Meizhou Kejia in July 2014.

=== Back to Liaoning ===
After an unsuccessful trial with Shanghai Shenhua, Qin returned to Liaoning Whowin on 27 February 2015. He made his first appearance since returning to the club on 7 March 2015 in a 1–0 away win against Guizhou Renhe which he assisted Chuka's winning goal in the 4th minute. He scored his first goal for Liaoning on 21 March 2015 in a 1–1 away draw against Shijiazhuang Ever Bright. On 24 May 2015, Qin took a free kick quickly and assisted Ding Haifeng scoring the equalizer when Chongqing Lifan's goalkeeper Sui Weijie left his goal unguarded to take a water break. He made 24 league appearances with one goal and three assistances in the 2015 season.

=== Shanghai Shenhua ===
On 15 January 2016, Qin transferred to Chinese Super League side Shanghai Shenhua. He made his debut for Shanghai on 5 March 2016 in a 1–1 home draw against Yanbian Funde. He received 13 yellow cards in the 2016 season including 11 in the league and two in the FA Cup, which was the highest in the league. On 11 March 2017, Qin was sent off by stamping Axel Witsel deliberately in a league match against Tianjin Quanjian. Qin was fined ¥300,000 and degraded to the reserve team by the club on the next day. Shanghai Shenhua announced a chase penalty on 13 March 2017 that the club decided to pay the minimum wage and refuse all transfer request on Qin when Qin was in the reserve team. On 24 March 2017, Qin received a ban of six months for the Chinese Super League matches and was fined ¥120,000 by the Chinese Football Association.

=== Dalian Yifang ===
On 21 June 2018, Qin was loaned to his hometown club Dalian Yifang for the rest of the season. On 7 July 2018, he made his home debut in a 3–0 home win over against Sichuan Jiuniu in the first leg of quarter-finals of 2018 Chinese FA Cup. He made his league debut for the club on 18 July 2018 in a 0–0 home draw against Hebei China Fortune, coming on as a substitute for Zhou Ting in the 75th minute. On 24 July 2018, he scored his first goal, a penalty, to beat Sichuan Jiuniu 2–0 in the second leg of quarter-finals of 2018 Chinese FA Cup.

Qin made a permanent transfer to Dalian Yifang on 13 February 2019.

=== End of football career ===
On 29 January 2026, Qin was given a lifetime ban for match-fixing by the Chinese Football Association.

== International career ==
Qin made his senior international debut for the Chinese national team on 22 February 2012 in a 2–0 win against Kuwait. On 11 June 2013, he was sent off by roughly tackling Jonathan de Guzmán in an international friendly against Netherlands. Qin received his last international call on 15 June 2013 in a disgraceful 5–1 home defeat against Thailand, which he was substituted off by Zhao Xuri in the 28th minute.

== Career statistics ==
Statistics accurate as of match played 5 December 2022.

Appearances and goals by club, season and competition
| Club | Season | League | | | National Cup | | League Cup | | Continental | | Other | | Total | |
| Club | Season | Division | Apps | Goals | Apps | Goals | Apps | Goals | Apps | Goals | Apps | Goals | Apps | Goals |
|---|---|---|---|---|---|---|---|---|---|---|---|---|---|---|
| Qingdao Jonoon | 2005 | Chinese Super League | 16 | 0 | 0 | 0 | 1 | 0 | - | | - | | 17 | 0 |
| Qingdao Jonoon | 2006 | Chinese Super League | 16 | 0 | 1 | 0 | - | | - | | - | | 17 | 0 |
| Qingdao Jonoon | 2007 | Chinese Super League | 5 | 0 | - | | - | | - | | - | | 5 | 0 |
| Qingdao Jonoon | 2008 | Chinese Super League | 8 | 0 | - | | - | | - | | - | | 8 | 0 |
| Qingdao Jonoon | Total | | 45 | 0 | 1 | 0 | 1 | 0 | 0 | 0 | 0 | 0 | 47 | 0 |
| Jiangsu Sainty | 2008 | China League One | 7 | 1 | - | | - | | - | | - | | 7 | 1 |
| Jiangsu Sainty | 2009 | Chinese Super League | 23 | 0 | - | | - | | - | | - | | 23 | 0 |
| Jiangsu Sainty | 2010 | Chinese Super League | 28 | 1 | - | | - | | - | | - | | 28 | 1 |
| Jiangsu Sainty | Total | | 58 | 2 | 0 | 0 | 0 | 0 | 0 | 0 | 0 | 0 | 58 | 2 |
| Liaoning Whowin | 2011 | Chinese Super League | 28 | 0 | 1 | 0 | - | | - | | - | | 29 | 0 |
| Guangzhou Evergrande | 2012 | Chinese Super League | 21 | 1 | 4 | 0 | - | | 5 | 0 | 1 (Note: Appearances in Chinese FA Super Cup) | 0 | 31 | 1 |
| Guangzhou Evergrande | 2013 | Chinese Super League | 14 | 0 | 3 | 0 | - | | 7 | 0 | 0 (Note: Appearances in Chinese FA Super Cup and FIFA Club World Cup) | 0 | 24 | 0 |
| Guangzhou Evergrande | 2014 | Chinese Super League | 0 | 0 | 0 | 0 | - | | 0 | 0 | 1 | 0 | 1 | 0 |
| Guangzhou Evergrande | Total | | 35 | 1 | 7 | 0 | 0 | 0 | 12 | 0 | 2 | 0 | 56 | 1 |
| Meizhou Kejia | 2014 | China League Two | 13 | 5 | 1 | 0 | - | | - | | - | | 14 | 5 |
| Liaoning Whowin | 2015 | Chinese Super League | 24 | 1 | 1 | 0 | - | | - | | - | | 25 | 1 |
| Shanghai Shenhua | 2016 | Chinese Super League | 27 | 0 | 3 | 0 | - | | - | | - | | 30 | 0 |
| Shanghai Shenhua | 2017 | Chinese Super League | 5 | 0 | 4 | 0 | - | | 1 | 0 | - | | 10 | 0 |
| Shanghai Shenhua | 2018 | Chinese Super League | 9 | 0 | 1 | 0 | - | | 4 | 0 | 1 | 0 | 15 | 0 |
| Shanghai Shenhua | Total | | 41 | 0 | 8 | 0 | 0 | 0 | 5 | 0 | 1 | 0 | 55 | 0 |
| Dalian Yifang (loan) | 2018 | Chinese Super League | 13 | 0 | 4 | 1 | - | | - | | - | | 17 | 1 |
| Dalian Yifang | 2019 | Chinese Super League | 21 | 1 | 3 | 0 | - | | - | | - | | 24 | 1 |
| Shanghai Shenhua | 2020 | Chinese Super League | 12 | 0 | 1 | 0 | - | | 4 | 0 | - | | 17 | 0 |
| Shanghai Shenhua | 2021 | Chinese Super League | 4 | 0 | 1 | 0 | - | | - | | - | | 5 | 0 |
| Shanghai Shenhua | 2022 | Chinese Super League | 5 | 0 | 1 | 0 | - | | - | | - | | 6 | 0 |
| Shanghai Shenhua | Total | | 21 | 0 | 3 | 0 | 0 | 0 | 4 | 0 | 0 | 0 | 28 | 0 |
| Career total | | | 299 | 10 | 29 | 1 | 1 | 0 | 21 | 0 | 3 | 0 | 353 | 11 |

== Honours ==
=== Club ===
Jiangsu Sainty

- China League One: 2008

Guangzhou Evergrande

- Chinese Super League: 2012, 2013
- Chinese FA Cup: 2012
- Chinese FA Super Cup: 2012
- AFC Champions League: 2013

Shanghai Shenhua

- Chinese FA Cup: 2017
