= Li Wei (footballer, born 1975) =

Chinese footballer and coach

Li Wei 李伟
Personal information
- Date of birth: 5 May 1975 (age 51)
- Place of birth: Xi'an, China
- Height: 1.91 m (6 ft 3 in)
- Position: Goalkeeper

Senior career*
Years	Team	Apps	(Gls)
1996–1997	Foshan Fosti		
1998–2004	Xiamen Lanshi	110	(0)
2005–2006	Guangzhou Pharmaceutical	29	(0)
2008	Anhui Jiufang	6	(0)

International career
2000	China	1	(0)

Managerial career
- 2009: Anhui Jiufang (goalkeeper coach)
- 2010–2014: China women's national team (goalkeeper coach)
- 2015–?: Shanghai Shenxin (goalkeeper coach)
- * Club domestic league appearances and goals

Li Wei (Chinese: 李伟; pinyin: Lǐ Wěi; Mandarin pronunciation: [lì wèɪ]; born 5 May 1975) is a Chinese football coach and former international player who played as a goalkeeper.

As a player he represented Foshan Fosti, Xiamen Lanshi before moving to Guangzhou Pharmaceutical and Anhui Jiufang. Since retiring he would move into goalkeeping coaching.

== Football career ==
Li Wei began his football career with second tier football club Foshan Fosti who was taken over by Xiamen Lanshi in the 1998 league season. At Xiamen he would go on to establish himself as the team's first choice goalkeeper and aid the team to win promotion to the top tier as well as the division title in 1999. His impressive performances was considered good enough to be called up to the Chinese national team in 2000 by the Head coach Bora Milutinović who gave him his debut appearance on March 25, 2000 against Yugoslavia in a 2-0 defeat, this was to be his only international cap . By the end of the season Xiamen were relegated, despite this Li Wei remained as team's first-choice goalkeeper for the next several seasons and aided the team to another second tier title in 2002 before leaving in 2005 for Guangzhou Sunray Cave in exchange for Han Feng. He spent two seasons with them where he was unable to achieve promotion before ending his career with Anhui Jiufang.

== Coach career ==
When the 2008 league season ended Li Wei announced his retirement from football, he decided to stay with Anhui Jiufang to become their goalkeeping coach.

He was appointed as the goalkeeping coach of China women's national team on 29 August 2010.

He became the goalkeeping coach of Chinese Super League side Shanghai Shenxin in January 2015.

== Honours ==
As a player

Xiamen Lanshi

- Chinese Jia B League: 1999, 2002
