= Sun Chengyao =

Chinese footballer and coach (born 1952)

Sun Chengyao 孙成耀
Personal information
- Date of birth: February 13, 1952 (age 74)
- Place of birth: Dalian, China
- Height: 1.77 m (5 ft 10 in)

Team information
- Current team: Changchun Yatai (assistant coach)

Youth career
- 1968–1972: Dalian Team

Senior career*
Years	Team	Apps	(Gls)
1972–1984	Chengdu Budui		

Managerial career
- 1990–1999: Dalian Wanda FC Youth Team
- 2000: Dalian Wanda FC (assistant coach)
- 2000–2002: China U-20 (assistant coach)
- 2002–2004: China U-23 (assistant coach)
- 2004–2006: Changchun Yatai (assistant coach)
- 2007: China women (assistant coach)
- 2008–2009: Guangzhou Pharmaceutical (assistant coach)
- 2010–2011: Changchun Yatai (assistant coach)
- * Club domestic league appearances and goals as of 1 Jan 2012

Sun Chengyao (Chinese: 孙成耀) (born February 13, 1952) is a Chinese football coach and a former football player. Since becoming a coach he has predominantly been an assistant and has helped coach the Chinese youth teams as well as China women's team before returning to club coaching.

== Club career ==
Sun Chengyao started his football career with the Dalian Shipyards youth team. He later joined the senior team of Chengdu Budui football club.

== Management career ==
After retiring as a player, Sun Chengyao returned to his home town to coach the renamed Dalian Wanda FC youth team. After nine years coaching players who successfully graduated to senior careers, Sun Chengyao was promoted to assistant coach of the senior team. This caught the attention of China's national teams: he subsequently spent two years as assistant coach to the Chinese Under-20 team (2000–2002), and a further two years with the Under-23 team (2002–2004).

After China failed to qualify for the football at the 2004 Summer Olympics, Sun returned to club football as an assistant coach to second-tier football club Changchun Yatai. There, he aided the club to promotion to the top tier; however, the entire management team subsequently left after accusations of match-fixing and pay disputes. These rumours were not proved, and in 2007 Sun found work with the Chinese women's national team. In 2008, he joined Guangzhou Pharmaceutical. Sun followed the team's manager Shen Xiangfu in leaving the club in 2009. Shen joined Changchun Yatai, and Sun was included in his coaching staff despite his previous hostile exit from the club.
