= Han Feng (footballer) =

Chinese footballer

Han Feng 韩锋
Personal information
- Full name: Han Feng
- Date of birth: 5 December 1983 (age 42)
- Place of birth: Shijiazhuang, Hebei, China
- Height: 1.87 m (6 ft 1 1/2 in)
- Position: Goalkeeper

Senior career*
Years	Team	Apps	(Gls)
2002–2004	Guangzhou F.C.	36	(0)
2005–2007	Xiamen Blue Lions	15	(0)
2008	Shenzhen Xiangxue Eisiti	1	(0)
2009–2012	Hangzhou Greentown	22	(0)
2013–2016	Henan Jianye	32	(0)
2016–2019	Guangzhou R&F	4	(0)
2020–2024	Cangzhou Mighty Lions	2	(0)

International career
2001	China U-17		
2003	China U-20		
- * Club domestic league appearances and goals as of 31 January 2023

Han Feng (Chinese: 韩锋; pinyin: Hán Fēng; Mandarin pronunciation: [xǎn fə́ŋ]; born on December 5, 1983, in Shijiazhuang, Hebei) is a Chinese footballer who played most recently for Cangzhou Mighty Lions as a goalkeeper.

== Club career ==
Beginning his career in 2002 for Guangzhou F.C. in the second tier, Han Feng would make his debut for the club on 23 March 2002 against Liaoning Xingguang in a 4–2 victory. He would retain his place within the team for the following league game against Xiamen Hongshi, that ended in a 1–0 defeat and also saw Han receive a red card. Despite this setback, Han would still be considered a promising goalkeeper and was subsequently named in the Chinese U-20 team.

By the 2005 league season Xiamen Blue Lions would be interested in his services in a player exchange for Li Wei. The move turned out to be a successful one when Xiamen would go on to win the division title and promotion to the top tier in 2005. The club, however would bring in international goalkeeper An Qi and Han often found himself playing as a second choice goalkeeper until the club were relegated and subsequently disbanded at the end of the 2007 league season.

As a free agent he would join Shenzhen Xiangxue Eisiti in the 2008 league season, however found himself as the team's third choice goalkeeper and would only make one appearance in the whole season in a league game on November 23, 2009, against Zhejiang Green Town in a 3–2 victory. This was his only appearance for the team before joining Hangzhou Greentown the following season where this time he was promoted to the team's second choice goalkeeper. This did not actually see him get much playing time until the 2010 league season saw Jiang Bo dropped as the team's first choice goalkeeper by the team's head coach Wu Jingui after a series of disappointing results. On 15 July 2016, Han transferred to Chinese Super League side Guangzhou R&F.

== International career ==
Han Feng played for the Chinese U-17 team and would go on to be promoted to the Chinese U-20, however during his time with both teams he was unable to aid China in qualification for any major tournament.

== Career statistics ==
Statistics accurate as of match played 31 January 2023.

Appearances and goals by club, season and competition
Club	Season	League			National Cup		Continental		Other		Total	
Club	Season	Division	Apps	Goals	Apps	Goals	Apps	Goals	Apps	Goals	Apps	Goals
Guangzhou F.C.	2002	Chinese Jia-B League	8	0	0	0	-		-		8	0
Guangzhou F.C.	2003	Chinese Jia-B League	18	0	1	0	-		-		19	0
Guangzhou F.C.	2004	China League One	10	0	0	0	-		-		10	0
Guangzhou F.C.	Total		36	0	1	0	0	0	0	0	37	0
Xiamen Blue Lions	2005	China League One	2	0	1	0	-		-		3	0
Xiamen Blue Lions	2006	Chinese Super League	5	0	2	0	-		-		7	0
Xiamen Blue Lions	2007	Chinese Super League	8	0	-		-		-		8	0
Xiamen Blue Lions	Total		15	0	3	0	0	0	0	0	18	0
Shenzhen Xiangxue Eisiti	2008	Chinese Super League	1	0	-		-		-		1	0
Hangzhou Greentown	2009	Chinese Super League	3	0	-		-		-		3	0
Hangzhou Greentown	2010	Chinese Super League	19	0	-		-		-		19	0
Hangzhou Greentown	2011	Chinese Super League	0	0	0	0	0	0	-		0	0
Hangzhou Greentown	2012	Chinese Super League	0	0	0	0	-		-		0	0
Hangzhou Greentown	Total		22	0	0	0	0	0	0	0	22	0
Henan Jianye	2013	China League One	1	0	2	0	-		-		3	0
Henan Jianye	2014	Chinese Super League	14	0	2	0	-		-		16	0
Henan Jianye	2015	Chinese Super League	17	0	1	0	-		-		18	0
Henan Jianye	Total		32	0	5	0	0	0	0	0	37	0
Guangzhou R&F	2016	Chinese Super League	4	0	3	0	-		-		7	0
Guangzhou R&F	2017	Chinese Super League	0	0	4	0	-		-		4	0
Guangzhou R&F	2018	Chinese Super League	0	0	5	0	-		-		5	0
Guangzhou R&F	2019	Chinese Super League	0	0	0	0	-		-		0	0
Guangzhou R&F	Total		4	0	12	0	0	0	0	0	16	0
Shijiazhuang Ever Bright/ Cangzhou Mighty Lions	2020	Chinese Super League	1	0	1	0	-		-		2	0
Shijiazhuang Ever Bright/ Cangzhou Mighty Lions	2021	Chinese Super League	0	0	1	0	-		-		1	0
Shijiazhuang Ever Bright/ Cangzhou Mighty Lions	2022	Chinese Super League	1	0	1	0	-		-		2	0
Shijiazhuang Ever Bright/ Cangzhou Mighty Lions	Total		2	0	3	0	0	0	0	0	5	0
Career total			112	0	24	0	0	0	0	0	136	0

== Honours ==
=== Club ===
Xiamen Blue Lions

- China League One: 2005

Henan Jianye

- China League One: 2013
