= Diogo Barcelos =

Brazilian footballer (born 1985)

Personal information
- Full name: Diogo de Lima Barcelos
- Date of birth: April 5, 1985 (age 41)
- Place of birth: Porto Alegre, Brazil
- Height: 1.72 m (5 ft 7 1/2 in)
- Position: Attacking midfielder

Team information
- Current team: São Paulo

Youth career
- 2001–2002: Internacional

Senior career*
Years	Team	Apps	(Gls)
2003–2009	Internacional	9	(1)
2005	→ Figueirense (loan)		
2006	→ Paulista (loan)		
2007–2008	→ Coritiba (loan)		
2008	→ Ipatinga (loan)		
2008	→ Bragantino (loan)		
2009	→ Guangzhou Pharmaceutical (loan)	18	(2)
2010–2011	Caxias		
2011	Botafogo (SP)		
2012	Bonsucesso		
2012	Sport		
2013	ABC	21	(2)
2014–2015	Icasa		
2016	Tupy		
2017–	São Paulo		
- * Club domestic league appearances and goals

Diogo de Lima Barcelos sometimes known simply as Diogo, is a Brazilian striker who currently plays for Icasa. He was born in Porto Alegre, on April 5, 1985 and is the twin brother of Diego Barcelos.

== Honours ==
- Campeonato Gaúcho: 2003, 2004.

== See also ==
- Diego de Lima Barcelos, twin brother
