= Liu Xiaofeng (footballer) =

Chinese footballer

Liu Xiaofeng 刘晓峰
Personal information
- Date of birth: January 19, 1985 (age 41)
- Place of birth: Dalian, China
- Height: 1.83 m (6 ft 0 in)
- Position: Striker

Youth career
- 2000–2003: Dalian Shide

Senior career*
Years	Team	Apps	(Gls)
2004–2007	Dalian Shide	0	(0)
2004	→Dalian Changbo (loan)	31	(2)
2006	→Guangzhou Pharmaceutical (loan)	5	(0)
2008	Dalian Yiteng	2	(0)
2009	Changsha Ginde	1	(0)
- * Club domestic league appearances and goals as of 1 Jan 2010 ‡ National team caps and goals as of 1 Jan 2010

Liu Xiaofeng (Chinese: 刘晓峰) (born January 19, 1985) is a Chinese football player who last played for Changsha Ginde.

== Club career ==
Liu Xiaofeng started his football career with top-tier side Dalian Shide in the 2004 Chinese league season and was soon loaned out second-tier club Dalian Changbo. This was then followed by another loan move to another second-tier club in Guangzhou Pharmaceutical throughout the 2006 league season. Upon his return it was eventually decided that Liu could leave the club for Dalian Yiteng. His move to the second-tier club, however was not a success and at the end of the 2008 China League One season the club were relegated. This would then lead his club to transfer list him before he joined top-tier club Changsha Ginde halfway through the 2009 Chinese Super League season where he made his debut on August 30 in a 3–0 defeat to Henan Jianye.
