= Li Bin (footballer) =

Chinese footballer

Li Bin 李彬
Personal information
- Full name: Li Bin
- Date of birth: 21 March 1991 (age 35)
- Place of birth: Meizhou, Guangdong, China
- Height: 1.79 m (5 ft 10 1/2 in)
- Position: Midfielder

Youth career
- 2008–2012: Guangzhou Evergrande

Senior career*
Years	Team	Apps	(Gls)
2009	Guangzhou Pharmaceutical	0	(0)
2011	Guangzhou Youth	17	(0)
2012–2013	Guangzhou Evergrande	0	(0)
2014–2017	Yinchuan Helanshan	51	(1)
2018	Shenzhen Ledman	25	(1)

International career
2009	China U-20		
- * Club domestic league appearances and goals as of 13 October 2018

Li Bin (Chinese: 李彬; pinyin: Lǐ Bīn; born 21 March 1991) is a Chinese footballer who currently plays for Shenzhen Ledman in the China League Two.

== Club career ==
Li Bin was promoted to Chinese Super League side Guangzhou Pharmaceutical's first squad in 2009 but didn't have a chance to appear in the league game. In February 2010, Guangzhou was relegated to China League One in the fallout of a match-fixing scandal. Li returned to Guangzhou's youth team when the club was renamed as Guangzhou Evergrande in March 2010. He played for Guangzhou Youth and made seventeen appearances in the 2011 third tier season. Li was promoted to reserves squad by Italian manager Marcello Lippi in July 2012. In 2013, Li was included in Guangzhou Evergrande's first team and was given the number 26 shirt, which was last worn by Wu Pingfeng.

In March 2014，Li moved to China League Two side Yinchuan Helanshan. In March 2018, Li transferred to League Two side Shenzhen Ledman.

== Career statistics ==
Statistics accurate as of match played 13 October 2018.

Club performance			League		Cup		League Cup		Continental		Total	
Season	Club	League	Apps	Goals	Apps	Goals	Apps	Goals	Apps	Goals	Apps	Goals
China PR			League		FA Cup		CSL Cup		Asia		Total	
2009	Guangzhou Pharmaceutical	Chinese Super League	0	0	-		-		-		0	0
2011	Guangzhou Youth	China League Two	17	0	-		-		-		17	0
2012	Guangzhou Evergrande	Chinese Super League	0	0	0	0	-		0	0	0	0
2013	Guangzhou Evergrande	Chinese Super League	0	0	0	0	-		0	0	0	0
2014	Yinchuan Helanshan	China League Two	13	0	1	0	-		-		14	0
2015	Yinchuan Helanshan	China League Two	5	0	2	1	-		-		7	1
2016	Yinchuan Helanshan	China League Two	18	1	2	1	-		-		20	2
2017	Yinchuan Helanshan	China League Two	15	0	2	0	-		-		17	0
2018	Shenzhen Ledman	China League Two	25	1	1	0	-		-		26	1
Total	Country		93	2	8	2	0	0	0	0	101	4

== Honours ==
=== Club ===
Guangzhou Evergrande

- Chinese Super League: 2013
- AFC Champions League: 2013
