= Wang Xiaoshi =

Chinese footballer

Wang Xiaoshi 王小诗
Personal information
- Date of birth: January 5, 1982 (age 44)
- Place of birth: Wuhan, Hubei, China
- Height: 1.88 m (6 ft 2 in)
- Positions: Defender; striker

Youth career
- Wuhan Guanggu

Senior career*
Years	Team	Apps	(Gls)
2000–2007	Wuhan Guanggu	101	(18)
2008–2010	Guangzhou F.C.	33	(0)
2011–2012	Wuhan Zall	39	(4)
- * Club domestic league appearances and goals as of 3 November 2012

Wang Xiaoshi (simplified Chinese: 王小诗; traditional Chinese: 王小詩; pinyin: Wáng Xiǎoshī; born January 5, 1982) is a former Chinese football player who currently plays as a versatile defender or striker.

== Club career ==
Wang Xiaoshi started his professional football career with Wuhan Guanggu after graduating from their youth team in the 2000 league season. During his time with Wuhan, he was part of the team that gained promotion into the Chinese Super League after the club won the 2004 division title. With the club he won the Chinese Super League cup at the end of the 2005 league season; however it wasn't until the 2006 league season that Wang established himself as being a vital member of Wuhan's defense. By the 2007 league season Wang was a constant regular for Wuhan; however, his time with the club was cut short when in the 2008 Chinese Super League season the club had a dispute with the Chinese Football Association after the club's management did not accept the punishment given to them by the Chinese Football Association after a scuffle broke out during a league game against Beijing Guoan on September 27, 2008, that saw the club decide to disband from the league.

Without a club to play for at the beginning of the 2008 Chinese Super League season, Wang Xiaoshi transferred to the newly promoted Guangzhou Pharmaceutical for 1.6 million yuan. Within his first season he established himself as a vital member within the team's defence and aided the club to a mid-table finish. The next season saw Wang have a terrible game against Hangzhou Greentown on April 11, 2009 which resulted in a 3-2 defeat and the club's manager Shen Xiangfu taking him off during the game, much to Wang's displeasure, which led to public falling-out between the manager and Wang's departure from the first team where he was replaced by Bai Lei within the team's defence. The situation only got worse for him as the club were relegated at the end of the 2009 league season and the club's new manager Lee Jang-Soo decided to drop Wang into the team's reserves and only offered him a single game within the whole of the 2010 league campaign.

Even though Guangzhou won the division title Wang seriously considered retiring until he decided to remain within the second tier when he joined Hubei Oriental at the beginning of the 2011 league season. With them he helped play a vital part in their promotion to the top tier at the end of the 2012 league season before he announced his retirement on 2 December 2012.

== Honours ==
Wuhan Guanggu

- China League One: 2004
- Chinese Super League Cup: 2005

Guangzhou F.C.

- China League One: 2010
