= Liu Yibing =

Chinese footballer

Liu Yibing 刘轶冰
Personal information
- Date of birth: April 16, 1975 (age 51)
- Place of birth: Dalian, China
- Height: 1.79 m (5 ft 10 in)
- Position: Defender

Youth career
- Beijing Budui

Senior career*
Years	Team	Apps	(Gls)
- Beijing Shougang
- Yunnan Tianyuan
1998	Dalian Yiteng		
1999–2000	Guangzhou Songri	25	(0)
2001–2006	Guangzhou Pharmaceutical		
2007–2008	Shanghai Stars		
- * Club domestic league appearances and goals as of April 15, 2009

Liu Yibing (Chinese: 刘轶冰) (born April 16, 1975) is a retired Chinese football player. He used to play for Guangzhou Songri, Guangzhou Pharmaceutical and Shanghai Stars.
