= Ma Liang (footballer) =

Chinese footballer

Ma Liang 马亮
Personal information
- Date of birth: February 27, 1982 (age 44)
- Place of birth: Shenyang, China
- Height: 1.70 m (5 ft 7 in)
- Position: Midfielder

Youth career
- Shenyang Ginde

Senior career*
Years	Team	Apps	(Gls)
2000–2003	Shenyang Ginde	44	(0)
2004	Jiangsu Shuntian	16	(1)
2008	Guangzhou Pharmaceutical	1	(0)

International career
2000–2001	China U-20		
2002–2003	China U-23		
Medal record
Representing China
Men's football
AFC Youth Championship
Bronze medal – third place	2000 َ Iran	Team
- * Club domestic league appearances and goals as of March 28, 2009

Ma Liang (Chinese: 马亮) born February 27, 1982, also known as Ma Yi (马义), is a Chinese football player.

== Career ==
He was the member of Chinese U-20 national team and played well in 2001 FIFA World Youth Championship. After his release by Jiangsu Shuntian, he did not attend any professional football matches until 2008. He signed a short contract with Guangzhou Pharmaceutical, and was released at the end of season 2008.
