= Bai Yuefeng =

Chinese footballer

Personal information
- Date of birth: 25 May 1987 (age 39)
- Place of birth: Yanbian, Jilin, China
- Height: 1.77 m (5 ft 10 in)
- Positions: Full-back; midfielder

Youth career
- 1999–2005: Beijing Huaya Feiying

Senior career*
Years	Team	Apps	(Gls)
2006–2007	Xiamen Blue Lions	48	(2)
2008–2009	Guangzhou Pharmaceutical	50	(2)
2010–2022	Tianjin Jinmen Tiger	298	(3)
Total		393	(7)

International career^{‡}
2010–2011	China PR	3	(0)

Managerial career
- 2021-2022: Tianjin Jinmen Tiger (assistant)
- * Club domestic league appearances and goals as of 21 April 2023 ‡ National team caps and goals as of 1 March 2013

Bai Yuefeng
- Simplified Chinese: 白岳峰
Transcriptions
Standard Mandarin
- Hanyu Pinyin: Bái Yuèfēng
- IPA: [pǎɪ ɥê fə́ŋ]

Chinese Korean name
- Chosŏn'gŭl: 백악봉
Transcriptions
- Revised Romanization: Baek Akbong
- McCune–Reischauer: Paek Akpong

Bai Lei
- Simplified Chinese: 白磊
Transcriptions
Standard Mandarin
- Hanyu Pinyin: Bái Lěi
- IPA: [pǎɪ lèɪ]

Chinese Korean name
- Chosŏn'gŭl: 백뢰
Transcriptions
- Revised Romanization: Baek Roe
- McCune–Reischauer: Paek Roe

Bai Yuefeng (Chinese: 白岳峰; Korean: 백악봉; born May 25, 1987), former name Bai Lei (Chinese: 白磊; Korean: 백뢰), is a Chinese former football player of Korean descent who played as a full back or midfielder for Xiamen Blue Lions, Guangzhou Pharmaceutical and Tianjin Jinmen Tiger.

== Club career ==
Born to Korean parents Bai Yuefeng was born and raised in China before he started his football career with the Beijing Huaya Feiying youth team where he was considered good enough to travel to Serbia and Montenegro on a three-year football training program. On his return he was scouted by top tier Chinese football team Shanghai International, however he sustained a serious injury during training and the club ended their interest, nevertheless recently promoted side Xiamen Blue Lions were willing to take a risk on him and Bai Lei signed a professional contract with them at the beginning of the 2006 league season. With Xiamen he was quickly included in the squads first team and make his league debut against Shandong Luneng on March 12, 2006, in a 3–1 defeat. Despite that defeat he quickly established himself within the squad and go on to score his first goal for the club in a league game on September 17, 2006, against Shenzhen Kingway in a 2–0 victory. In the following season he solidified his position in the Xiamen team, but could not prevent them from relegation at the end of the 2007 league season. Bai joined newly promoted Chinese Super League side Guangzhou Pharmaceutical at the beginning of the 2008 league season, and played in the club's first league game of the season against Shenzhen Xiangxue on March 30, 2008, in a 3–0 victory. The club's manager Shen Xiangfu moved him into the team's defence, and this seemed to work; Guangzhou had seventh-place finish at the end of season.

While Bai continued his good form for Guangzhou the club were discovered to be involved in a match-fixing scandal that was directly related to their promotion to the top tier and were relegated at the end of the 2009 league season. Bai refused to return Guangzhou for pre-season training and searched for transfer. On February 12, 2010, Bai joined Tianjin Teda for a fee of ¥1.7 million. He made his debut in a league game against Shanghai Shenhua on April 14, 2010, in a 2–0 defeat. Throughout the season he was given more opportunities by the manager Arie Haan who decided to move Bai to full back. After 13 seasons with the club he retired on 21 April 2023 with a commemorative ceremony.

On 15 November 2025, Bai was sentenced to one year in prison, with a one-year probation and fined ¥100,000 for accepting a bribe of ¥350,000 from the Hebei China Fortune in 2019 and engaging in match-fixing.

On 29 January 2026, the Chinese Football Association announced that Bai was banned from football-related activities in China for life for involving in match-fixing.

== International career ==
Bai Lei made his first appearance for the China national football team on June 4, 2010, in a friendly match against France in a 1–0 victory. In reparation for the 2011 AFC Asian Cup he made his second appearance in a friendly against Syria on October 8, 2010, in a 2–1 victory.

== Career statistics ==
Appearances and goals by club, season and competition
Club	Season	League			National Cup		Continental		Other		Total	
Club	Season	Division	Apps	Goals	Apps	Goals	Apps	Goals	Apps	Goals	Apps	Goals
Xiamen Blue Lions	2006	Chinese Super League	24	2	3	0	–		–		27	2
Xiamen Blue Lions	2007	Chinese Super League	21	0	–		–		–		21	0
Xiamen Blue Lions	Total		45	2	3	0	0	0	0	0	48	2
Guangzhou Pharmaceutical	2008	Chinese Super League	30	1	–		–		–		30	1
Guangzhou Pharmaceutical	2009	Chinese Super League	20	1	–		–		–		20	1
Guangzhou Pharmaceutical	Total		50	2	0	0	0	0	0	0	50	2
Tianjin Jinmen Tiger	2010	Chinese Super League	24	1	–		–		–		24	1
Tianjin Jinmen Tiger	2011	Chinese Super League	28	0	3	1	6	0	–		37	1
Tianjin Jinmen Tiger	2012	Chinese Super League	29	0	1	0	6	0	1 (Note: Appearances in Chinese FA Super Cup)	0	37	0
Tianjin Jinmen Tiger	2013	Chinese Super League	28	0	0	0	–		–		28	0
Tianjin Jinmen Tiger	2014	Chinese Super League	28	1	1	0	–		–		29	0
Tianjin Jinmen Tiger	2015	Chinese Super League	30	1	0	0	–		–		30	1
Tianjin Jinmen Tiger	2016	Chinese Super League	28	0	0	0	–		–		28	0
Tianjin Jinmen Tiger	2017	Chinese Super League	25	0	1	0	–		–		26	0
Tianjin Jinmen Tiger	2018	Chinese Super League	21	0	0	0	–		–		21	0
Tianjin Jinmen Tiger	2019	Chinese Super League	17	0	1	0	–		–		18	0
Tianjin Jinmen Tiger	2020	Chinese Super League	9	0	2	0	–		–		11	0
Tianjin Jinmen Tiger	2021	Chinese Super League	10	0	2	0	–		–		12	0
Tianjin Jinmen Tiger	2022	Chinese Super League	21	0	0	0	–		–		21	0
Tianjin Jinmen Tiger	Total		298	3	11	1	12	0	1	0	322	4
Career total			393	7	14	1	12	0	1	0	420	8

== Honours ==
=== Club ===
Tianjin Teda

- Chinese FA Cup: 2011
