= Ren Jiaqing =

Chinese football coach and former player

Ren Jiaqing 任嘉庆
Personal information
- Date of birth: August 9, 1957 (age 69)
- Place of birth: Beijing, China
- Position: Defender

Team information
- Current team: Changchun Yatai(assistant coach)

Senior career*
Years	Team	Apps	(Gls)
1977–?	Beijing Team		

Managerial career
- 1996–1997: China national football team(team doctor)
- 1998–2001: Beijing Kuanli (assistant coach&team doctor)
- 2002–2003: Yunnan Hongta (assistant coach&team doctor)
- 2005: Hunan Shoking (assistant coach)
- 2007–2009: Guangzhou Pharmaceutical(assistant coach)
- 2010–2011: Changchun Yatai(assistant coach)
- * Club domestic league appearances and goals as of April 18, 2012

Ren Jiaqing (Chinese: 任嘉庆; born August 9, 1957) is an assistant coach and a former Chinese football player. His last appointment was as the assistant coach at Chinese Super League side Changchun Yatai.
