= Gao Ming (footballer, born 1982) =

Chinese footballer

Gao Ming 高明
Personal information
- Full name: Gao Ming
- Date of birth: February 19, 1982 (age 44)
- Place of birth: Qingdao, Shandong, China
- Height: 1.80 m (5 ft 11 in)
- Positions: Second striker; striker

Youth career
- 1997–1999: Qingdao Etsong

Senior career*
Years	Team	Apps	(Gls)
2000–2004	Qingdao Etsong	93	(19)
2005	Shandong Luneng	3	(0)
2006	→ Changchun Yatai (loan)	18	(2)
2007	→ Guangzhou Pharmaceutical (loan)	7	(2)
2008	Guangzhou Pharmaceutical	11	(1)
Total		132	(24)

International career
	China U20	?	(?)
	China U23	?	(?)

Managerial career
- 2012: Changchun RCB Fengyun
- 2013–: Qingdao Jonoon U-9
Medal record
Representing China
Men's football
AFC Youth Championship
Bronze medal – third place	2000 َ Iran	Team
- * Club domestic league appearances and goals

Gao Ming (Chinese: 高明; pinyin: Gāo Míng; born February 19, 1982, in Qingdao) is a retired Chinese football second striker.

== Professional career ==
=== Qingdao ===
His career at Qingdao was a big success. He started representing Qingdao Etsong in senior level matches in 2000. Along with Qu Bo, they were considered to be one of the best attacking partners in China.

=== Shandong Luneng ===
Shandong Luneng purchased Gao Ming in early 1995. The club paid 3 million RMB together with Liu Zhiyong and Qin Sheng to Qingdao Jonoon. He joined Shandong Luneng with a big expectation. However, he could not secure a position in Shandong Luneng in 2005.

=== Changchun Yatai ===
Gao Ming joined Changchun Yatai on loan in 2006.

=== Guangzhou ===
Gao Ming joined Shen Xiangfu, his coach in China Youth team in 2007 on loan again. After Guangzhou Pharmaceutical promoted into the China Super League, Gao Ming transferred to Guangzhou Pharmaceutical permanently in 2008.
