= Zhang Si =

Chinese footballer

Zhang Si 张思
Personal information
- Date of birth: June 12, 1983 (age 43)
- Place of birth: Beijing, China
- Height: 1.85 m (6 ft 1 in)
- Position: Goalkeeper

Youth career
- Beijing Guoan

Senior career*
Years	Team	Apps	(Gls)
2002–2005	Beijing Guoan	0	(0)
2003	→ Sinchi (loan)	16	(0)
2004–2005	→ Beijing BIT (loan)	0	(0)
2006–2007	Beijing BIT	5	(0)
2008–2009	Guangzhou Pharmaceutical	2	(0)
2010	Beijing BIT	9	(0)

International career
2002–2003	China U20		
- * Club domestic league appearances and goals as of 15 March 2010

Zhang Si (Chinese: 张思; born June 12, 1983) is a Chinese football player.

== Club career ==
Zhang Si began his professional football career with Beijing Guoan where he would go on to become the team's third choice goalkeeper. To get more playing time he would be loaned out in 2003 to Sinchi FC to play in the Singapore league. His time at Singapore was personally considered a success and he would go to attract the interests of Chinese team Wuhan Huanghelou, however the interests died out when both clubs could not agree on a transfer price. He would go on to be loaned out once more to Beijing Institute of Technology FC who were a College football team during his loan period. When the loan period ended he would permanently transfer to them when the club decided to officially enter the Chinese league pyramid and become a professional football team. It turned out to be a successful move when he would help the team win their last Collegiate championship and also immediate promotion to the second tier when they won the division championship. After spending the next few seasons establishing the team within the league newly promoted top tier side Guangzhou Pharmaceutical were looking for a reserve goalkeeper for Li Shuai. Zhang Si would eventually make his debut in a league game against Changchun Yatai on October 11, 2008 after Li Shuai was substituted during the game after a poor performance, the game unfortunately ended 6-0 to Changchun. Zhang would not play another game for Guangzhou until October 31, 2009 in a 2-1 defeat to Tianjin Teda F.C. that was also the last game of the season. At the end of the season he was allowed to leave and he joined Beijing Institute of Technology FC once more.

== Honours ==
Beijing Institute of Technology FC

- China League Two: 2006
- Chinese Collegiate championship: 2006
