= José Duarte (footballer) =

Brazilian footballer

Personal information
- Full name: José Geraldo Silva Filho Duarte
- Date of birth: July 6, 1980 (age 46)
- Place of birth: Nova Lima, Brazil
- Height: 1.87 m (6 ft 1 1/2 in)
- Position: Striker

Senior career*
Years	Team	Apps	(Gls)
1995–1996	Vila Nova FC GO	?	(?)
1996–1997	Cruzeiro EC	?	(?)
1997–1998	Goiás EC	?	(?)
1998–2000	Anapolina	?	(?)
2000–2003	Club Brugge	16	(0)
2003	→ RWD Molenbeek(loan)	11	(1)
2003–2004	Hapoel Be'er Sheva	8	(1)
2004–2005	Hapoel Nazareth Illit	31	(13)
2005–2006	Maccabi Tel Aviv	21	(4)
2006–2007	Hapoel Kfar Saba	27	(8)
2007–2008	Bnei Yehuda	14	(1)
2008	Guangzhou Pharmaceutical	21	(3)
2009–2010	Chongqing Lifan	43	(17)
2011–2014	Shenyang Shenbei	101	(50)
- * Club domestic league appearances and goals as of 11 November 2014

José Duarte (born July 6, 1980) is a Brazilian football striker who currently plays for Shenyang Shenbei in the China League One.

He previously played for Maccabi Tel Aviv, Anapolina, Club Brugge, Hapoel Be'er Sheva, Hapoel Nazareth Illit, Hapoel Kfar Saba, Guangzhou Pharmaceutical and Chongqing Lifan.

José transferred to Tianjin Runyulong in March 2011.

== Honours ==
- Belgian Cup (1):
  - 2002
- Belgian Supercup (1):
  - 2002
