= Tan Ning (footballer) =

Chinese footballer

Tan Ning 谭宁
Personal information
- Date of birth: 28 May 1990 (age 36)
- Place of birth: Nanjing, China
- Height: 1.90 m (6 ft 3 in)
- Position: Goalkeeper

Youth career
- –2007: Nanjing FA Youth
- 2008: Guangzhou Pharmaceutical

Senior career*
Years	Team	Apps	(Gls)
2007	Nanjing Tehu		
2009	Guangzhou Pharmaceutical		
- * Club domestic league appearances and goals as of 7 May 2009

Tan Ning (Chinese: 谭宁) (born 28 May 1990) is a Chinese football player.

== Club career ==
He used to play for an amateur club Nanjing Tehu of Nanjing City League in 2007.
