= Ismael Alvarado =

Peruvian footballer (born 1980)

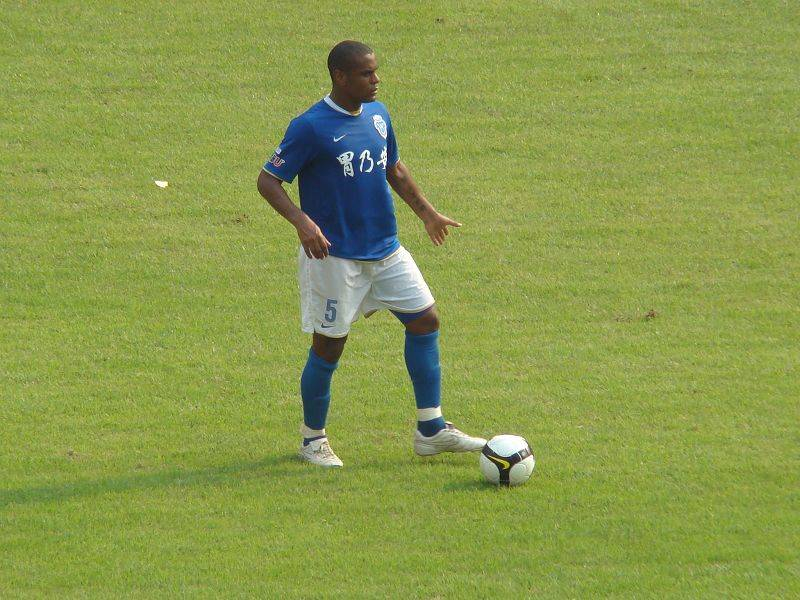

Personal information
- Full name: Ismael Enrique Alvarado Quiñones
- Date of birth: October 22, 1980 (age 46)
- Place of birth: Lima, Peru
- Height: 1.82 m (6 ft 0 in)
- Position: Center back

Senior career*
| Years | Team | Apps | (Gls) |
| 1998–2000 | Sporting Cristal | 67 | (2) |
| 2001 | Cienciano | | |
| 2002–2004 | Estudiantes Medicina | 5 | (0) |
| 2005 | Coronel Bolognesi | 29 | (0) |
| 2006–2007 | Alianza Lima | 50 | (3) |
| 2008–2009 | Guangzhou Pharma. | 54 | (0) |
| 2010 | Univ. César Vallejo | 8 | (0) |
| 2011 | Cobresol | 18 | (0) |
| 2012 | Sport Huancayo | 0 | (0) |
| 2012 | Cobresol | 11 | (0) |
| 2012 | José Gálvez FBC | 10 | (0) |
| 2013 | Los Caimanes | 9 | (1) |
| 2014 | Alianza Universidad | 10 | (1) |
| 2015 | Sport Victoria | 8 | (0) |

International career^{‡}
| 2007 | Peru | 1 | (0) |
- * Club domestic league appearances and goals as of 1 January 2016 ‡ National team caps and goals as of 2 February 2010

Ismael Enrique Alvarado Quiñones (born 22 October 1980) is a retired Peruvian footballer who plays as a central defender. He currently plays for Sport Victoria in the Peruvian Segunda División.

== International career ==
Ismael Alvarado made his debut for Peru in a 0–2 friendly loss to Japan on March 24, 2007.

== Honours ==
Alianza Lima

- Torneo Descentralizado: 2006

Los Caimanes

- Peruvian Segunda División: 2013
