= Yang Pengfeng =

Chinese footballer and commentator (born 1979)

Yang Pengfeng 杨朋锋
Personal information
- Date of birth: February 9, 1979 (age 47)
- Place of birth: Guangzhou, China
- Height: 1.79 m (5 ft 10 in)
- Position: Striker

Senior career*
Years	Team	Apps	(Gls)
1998–1999	Guangzhou Songri	6	(1)
2000–2005	Sichuan Guancheng	93	(9)
2006–2008	Guangzhou Pharmaceutical	45	(15)
2009	G.D. Artilheiros	5	(5)
- * Club domestic league appearances and goals as of 28 June 2009

Yang Pengfeng (simplified Chinese: 杨朋锋; traditional Chinese: 楊朋锋; pinyin: Yáng Péngfēng; Cantonese Yale: Yeung4 Pang4 Fung1; born February 9, 1979) is a Chinese football commentator and footballer. He played for Guangzhou Matsunichi, Sichuan First City, and Guangzhou, before ending his career with G.D. Artilheiros.

== Career ==
Yang started his football career with top-tier club Guangzhou Matsunichi, however it was at Sichuan First City, where he established himself as a regular within the team. After several seasons Yang returned to his hometown club, Guangzhou, in 2006, to play in the second tier for 800,000 yuan. Upon his return he would go on to win the division title with them and promotion into the Chinese Super League but was released by Guangzhou at the end of 2008 league season. He would end his career for Macau football club G.D. Artilheiros before moving into Futsal with the Jiangmen team.

Yang went on to become active as a commentator, providing analysis to Guangdong Television for Chinese Super League, Chinese FA Cup and AFC Champions League Elite. He is the player-manager of an amateur team, Zhaoqing Hengtai, who reached the second round in the 2014 Chinese FA Cup.

== Honours ==
Guangzhou Pharmaceutical

- China League One: 2007
