= Zhou Lin (footballer) =

Chinese footballer

Zhou Lin 周麟
Personal information
- Date of birth: February 4, 1981 (age 45)
- Place of birth: Tianjin, China
- Height: 1.85 m (6 ft 1 in)
- Position: Defender

Youth career
- 1998–1999: Chongqing Lifan

Senior career*
Years	Team	Apps	(Gls)
1999–2006	Chongqing Lifan	119	(0)
2007–2010	Guangzhou Evergrande	64	(0)

Managerial career
- 2021–2022: Shanxi Longjin (caretaker)
- 2023: Shijiazhuang Gongfu
- 2024: Dalian K'un City
- 2025: Guangxi Pingguo
- 2025: Shanxi Chongde Ronghai (assistant)
Medal record
Representing China
Men's football
AFC Youth Championship
Bronze medal – third place	2000 َ Iran	Team
- * Club domestic league appearances and goals as of 1 Jan 2012

Zhou Lin (Chinese: 周麟; born February 4, 1981) is a Chinese former football player as a defender.

== Club career ==
=== Chongqing Lifan ===
Zhou Lin began his professional football career when he was able to break into the Chongqing Lifan first-team during the 1999 league season after previously playing for their youth team. Under head coach Lee Jang-Soo he was able to quickly establish himself within the team and even help Chongqing win the 2000 Chinese FA Cup, however once Lee Jang-Soo left Chongqing found themselves struggling to remain within the top tier. Despite Chongqing constantly struggling within the league and several managerial changes Zhou Lin would still remain a constant regular first-team member within the team until Chongqing were finally relegated in the 2006 league season and were willing to let Zhou Lin leave the club.

=== Guangzhou Pharmaceutical ===
He would move to second-tier side Guangzhou Pharmaceutical at the beginning of the 2007 league season where he would quickly become an integral member of the team that won the league and gain promotion to the Chinese Super League. Returning to the top tier Zhou Lin immediately helped establish Guangzhou within the league and saw them finish middle of the table. The following season was, however, to prove more difficult for him as head coach Shen Xiangfu preferred using different defenders that saw his playing time limited. Nevertheless, he was still given the chance to play against Beijing Guoan F.C. on June 28, 2009, but his performance was extremely disappointing and the game ended in a 1–1 draw that saw the vice-captain Xu Liang publicly criticize his performance. This would see infighting between the two breakout and while Shen Xiangfu tried to end the infighting Zhou was frozen out of the team. At the end of the season both Xu Liang and Shen Xiangfu left the club, however despite this he was allowed to leave the club once his contract ended.

== Club career stats ==
Last update: 30 October 2010

Season	Team	Country	Division	Apps	Goals
1999	Chongqing Lifan	China	1	0	0
2000	Chongqing Lifan	China	1	5	0
2001	Chongqing Lifan	China	1	12	0
2002	Chongqing Lifan	China	1	24	0
2003	Chongqing Lifan	China	1	22	0
2004	Chongqing Lifan	China	1	15	0
2005	Chongqing Lifan	China	1	20	0
2006	Chongqing Lifan	China	1	21	0
2007	Guangzhou Pharmaceutical	China	2	22	0
2008	Guangzhou Pharmaceutical	China	1	24	0
2009	Guangzhou Pharmaceutical	China	1	18	0
2010	Guangzhou Evergrande	China	2	0	0

== Honours ==
Chongqing Lifan

- Chinese FA Cup: 2000

Guangzhou Pharmaceutical

- China League One: 2007, 2010
