= Jia Wenpeng =

Chinese footballer

Jia Wenpeng 贾文鹏
Personal information
- Date of birth: August 3, 1978 (age 48)
- Place of birth: Dalian, China
- Height: 1.77 m (5 ft 10 in)
- Position: Midfielder

Youth career
- 1994–1996: Bayi

Senior career*
Years	Team	Apps	(Gls)
1996–2003	Bayi	104	(3)
2004	Shanghai Shenhua	7	(0)
2005–2006	Chongqing Lifan	39	(1)
2007–2008	Guangzhou Pharmaceutical	22	(1)

Managerial career
- 2014–2015: Dalian Aerbin (assistant)
Medal record
Representing China
Men's football
AFC Youth Championship
Silver medal – second place	1996 َ South Korea	Team
- * Club domestic league appearances and goals as of March 28, 2009

Jia Wenpeng (Chinese: 贾文鹏; born August 3, 1978) is a former Chinese footballer who spent the majority of his career for Bayi before joining Shanghai Shenhua, Chongqing Lifan and Guangzhou Pharmaceutical where he was released at the end of 2008 season.

== Club career ==
Jia Wenpeng began his professional football career in 1996 with Bayi where he was a loyal member of the team until the end of the 2003 league season saw the club relegated and then later disbanded at the end of the campaign. He would join top-tier club Shanghai Shenhua in 2004, however he did not play well at the club and was released at the end of 2004 season. Jia would then move to Chongqing Lifan in 2005 for 2.4 million Yuan and then later transferred to second-tier club Guangzhou Pharmaceutical along with teammate Zhou Lin in 2007. While at Guangzhou he would play a small part as the team won the division title, however while he gained more playing time the following season he was released in 2008.

== Management career ==
Jia Wenpeng was named as the head coach of China League Two side Shenyang Dongjin on December 4, 2016.

== Honours ==
=== Club ===
Guangzhou Pharmaceutical

- China League One: 2007
