= Diego Barcelos =

Brazilian footballer (born 1985)

Personal information
- Full name: Diego de Lima Barcelos
- Date of birth: 5 April 1985 (age 41)
- Place of birth: Porto Alegre, Brazil
- Height: 1.72 m (5 ft 7 1/2 in)
- Position: Attacking midfielder

Youth career
- 2001–2003: Internacional

Senior career*
Years	Team	Apps	(Gls)
2003–2007	Internacional	54	(10)
2005	→ Santos (loan)	12	(1)
2006	→ Figueirense (loan)	9	(3)
2007	→ Sport Recife (loan)	10	(1)
2007–2008	Marília	10	(2)
2008	→ Guangzhou GPC (loan)	26	(6)
2009	Guangzhou GPC	25	(3)
2010–2014	Nacional	103	(17)
2014	AEL Limassol	10	(2)
2015–2016	Police United	20	(3)
2016	Brasília	2	(0)
2016	Dom Pedro	5	(1)
2016–2017	Varzim	25	(2)
2017–2019	Nacional	21	(1)

International career
2004–2005	Brazil U20	6	(1)
- * Club domestic league appearances and goals as of 23:29, 18 September 2019 (UTC)

Diego de Lima Barcelos (born 5 April 1985) is a Brazilian footballer who plays as an attacking midfielder. He has a twin brother named Diogo.

== Club career ==
Diego Barcelos made his Liga Sagres debut for C.D. Nacional on January 30, 2010, in a 0–4 loss to F.C. Porto. He scored his first goal for the club on his fourth appearance, in a 2–0 home win against U.D. Leiria on 18 April. In 2014, he signed for AEL Limassol in the Cypriot First Division.

== Honours ==
- Rio Grande do Sul State League: 2000, 2003, 2004, 2005
- Pernambuco State League: 2007

== See also ==
Diogo de Lima Barcelos
