= Fan Qi (referee) =

Chinese policeman and football referee

- Full name: Fan Qi
- Born: 18 April 1971 (age 55); Beijing, China
- Other occupation: Policeman

International
Years	League	Role
2008–2015	FIFA	Referee
2008–2015	AFC	Referee

Fan Qi (Chinese: 范琦; pinyin: Fàn Qí; Mandarin pronunciation: [fân tɕʰǐ]; born 18 April 1971) is a Chinese policeman and football referee who has been a full international referee for FIFA.

Fan became a FIFA referee in 2008. He served as a referee for the 2014 FIFA World Cup qualifiers, beginning with the preliminary-round match between Nepal and Jordan.
