= Tao Rancheng =

Chinese football referee (born 1970)

Tao Rancheng 陶然成
- Full name: Tao Rancheng
- Born: June 1, 1970 (age 56)

International
| Years | League | Role |

Tao Rancheng (Chinese: 陶然成; pinyin: Táo Ránchéng; Mandarin pronunciation: [tʰǎʊ ɻǎn ʈʂʰə̌ŋ]; born 1 June 1970) is a Chinese football referee. He has refereed internationally in the AFC Asian Cup, ASEAN Football Championship, and FIFA World Cup qualifiers. He is also a referee at the Chinese Super League.
