= Luo Xi (footballer) =

Chinese association football player

Personal information
- Date of birth: 2 March 1991 (age 35)
- Place of birth: Chongqing, Sichuan, China
- Height: 1.80 m (5 ft 11 in)
- Position: Defender

Youth career
- 2002–2003: Genbao Football Base
- 2003–2005: Ma Mingyu Football School
- 2006–2010: Beijing Guoan

Senior career*
Years	Team	Apps	(Gls)
2011–2013	Shenzhen Ruby	47	(0)
2014–2016	Shanghai Shenhua	0	(0)
2014	→ Beijing Baxy (loan)	6	(0)
2017–2019	Meizhou Hakka	19	(0)
2019	→ Shenzhen Pengcheng (loan)	10	(0)
2021	Hunan Billows	16	(0)
- * Club domestic league appearances and goals as of 16 May 2022

Luo Xi (simplified Chinese: 罗希; traditional Chinese: 羅希; pinyin: Luó Xī; born 2 March 1991) is a Chinese footballer who plays as a defender.

== Club career ==
Luo Xi would make his professional debut in a league game for Shenzhen Ruby within the 2011 Chinese Super League season against Tianjin TEDA on 1 April 2011, in a game that ended in a 1-0 defeat.

== Career statistics ==
As of 31 December 2020.

Club	Season	League			Cup		Continental		Other		Total	
Club	Season	Division	Apps	Goals	Apps	Goals	Apps	Goals	Apps	Goals	Apps	Goals
Shenzhen Ruby	2011	Chinese Super League	24	0	1	0	–		0	0	25	0
Shenzhen Ruby	2012	China League One	15	0	0	0	–		0	0	15	0
Shenzhen Ruby	2013	China League One	8	0	1 (Note: Appearances in the Chinese FA Cup)	0	–		0	0	9	0
Shenzhen Ruby	Total		47	0	2	0	0	0	0	0	49	0
Beijing Baxy (loan)	2014	China League One	6	0	0	0	–		0	0	6	0
Meizhou Hakka	2017	China League One	11	0	0	0	–		0	0	11	0
Meizhou Hakka	2018	China League One	9	0	1	0	–		0	0	10	0
Meizhou Hakka	2019	China League One	0	0	0	0	–		0	0	0	0
Meizhou Hakka	2020	China League One	0	0	0	0	–		0	0	0	0
Meizhou Hakka	Total		20	0	1	0	0	0	0	0	21	0
Shenzhen Pengcheng (loan)	2019	China League Two	10	0	0	0	-		0	0	10	0
Career total			83	0	3	0	0	0	0	0	86	0
