= Xu Dexin =

Chinese footballer (born 1985)

Xu Dexin 徐德欣
Personal information
- Date of birth: 2 November 1985 (age 40)
- Place of birth: Guangzhou, Guangdong, China
- Height: 1.72 m (5 ft 8 in)
- Position: Winger

Youth career
- Guangzhou FC

Senior career*
| Years | Team | Apps | (Gls) |
| 2004–2010 | Guangzhou | 30 | (2) |
| 2004–2005 | → Xiangxue Pharmaceutical | 10 | (1) |
| 2011 | Hunan Billows | 6 | (0) |

International career
| 2006 | China U-20 | | |
- * Club domestic league appearances and goals as of 30 October 2010

Xu Dexin (Chinese: 徐德欣; pinyin: Xú Déxīn; born 2 November 1985), former name Xu De'en (Chinese: 徐德恩), is a Chinese football player.

== Club career ==
Xu Dexin rose to prominence in 2005 for Guangzhou F.C. where he was praised for his speed and ability. During his time with Guangzhou he has seen them fight for promotion, eventually achieving this the 2007 season where they won the second tier league title. Since Guangzhou were promoted to the Chinese Super League Xu De'en has often found himself playing predominantly as a substitute. Xu move to China League One side Hunan Billows on a free transfer in February 2011. He was released from the team at the end of 2011 season due to severe injury.

== Club career statistics ==
| Club performance | | | League | | Cup | | League Cup | | Continental | | Total | |
| Season | Club | League | Apps | Goals | Apps | Goals | Apps | Goals | Apps | Goals | Apps | Goals |
| Hong Kong | | | League | | FA Cup & Shield | | League Cup | | Asia | | Total | |
|---|---|---|---|---|---|---|---|---|---|---|---|---|
| 2004–05 | Xiangxue Pharmaceutical | First Division League | 10 | 1 | ? | ? | ? | ? | - | | 10 | 1 |
| China PR | | | League | | FA Cup | | CSL Cup | | Asia | | Total | |
| 2006 | Guangzhou F.C. | China League One | 4 | 0 | 0 | 0 | - | | - | | 4 | 0 |
| 2007 | Guangzhou F.C. | China League One | 20 | 2 | - | | - | | - | | 20 | 2 |
| 2008 | Guangzhou F.C. | Chinese Super League | 3 | 0 | - | | - | | - | | 3 | 0 |
| 2009 | Guangzhou F.C. | Chinese Super League | 1 | 0 | - | | - | | - | | 1 | 0 |
| 2010 | Guangzhou F.C. | China League One | 2 | 0 | - | | - | | - | | 2 | 0 |
| 2011 | Hunan Billows | China League One | 6 | 0 | 1 | 0 | - | | - | | 7 | 0 |
| 2016 | Zhaoqing Hengtai | China Amateur Football League | - | | 3 | 3 | - | | - | | 3 | 3 |
| Total | Hong Kong | | 10 | 1 | 0 | 0 | 0 | 0 | 0 | 0 | 10 | 1 |
| Total | China PR | | 36 | 2 | 4 | 3 | 0 | 0 | 0 | 0 | 40 | 5 |
| Career total | | | 46 | 3 | 4 | 3 | 0 | 0 | 0 | 0 | 50 | 6 |

Statistics accurate as of match played 30 October 2016

== Honours ==
Guangzhou F.C.

- China League One: 2007, 2010
