= Dai Xianrong =

Chinese footballer (born 1982)

Dai Xianrong 戴宪荣
Personal information
- Date of birth: February 7, 1982 (age 44)
- Place of birth: Guangzhou, China
- Height: 1.86 m (6 ft 1 in)
- Position: Defender

Youth career
- Guangzhou Youth

Senior career*
Years	Team	Apps	(Gls)
2000–2001	Guangzhou Ucan		
2002–2010	Guangzhou Evergrande	116	(6)
2008	→Shenzhen Shangqingyin (loan)	17	(0)
- * Club domestic league appearances and goals as of 30 October 2010

Dai Xianrong (Chinese: 戴宪荣; born February 7, 1982) is a former professional Chinese footballer who mainly played as a centre-back. Throughout his career he predominantly played for Guangzhou F.C. where he won two second tier Chinese league one titles with them in 2007 and 2010 before retiring. And he was the member of U-23 China National Football Team.

== Club career ==
Dai Xianrong predominately spent his career with his local football club Guangzhou F.C. and joined their senior team at the beginning of the 2002 Chinese league season. Within the second tier he would steadily establish himself as a regular within the squad over the seasons, which saw him become vice-captain of the team that won promotion to the Chinese Super League with Guangzhou at the end of the 2007 league season. Before the start of the 2008 Chinese Super League season the club brought in Peruvian international Ismael Enrique Alvarado and on March 29, 2008 Dai was allowed to go on loan to top tier side Shenzhen Shangqingyin for the rest of the season. Upon his return in the 2009 league season he would be used sparsely throughout the campaign, however despite the club finishing ninth they were relegated to the second tier for match-fixing during their 2007 promotion campaign. Dai would stay loyal to the team and remained at the club, however with the Evergrande Real Estate Group taking over the club they invested significantly within the squad and Dai saw his playing time drop, which saw him decide to announce his retirement after winning the 2010 Chinese league one title at the end of the season.

== Honours ==
Guangzhou F.C.

- China League One: 2007, 2010
