= Huang Zhiyi =

Chinese footballer

Huang Zhiyi 黄志毅
Personal information
- Date of birth: February 3, 1981 (age 45)
- Place of birth: Guangzhou, China
- Height: 1.80 m (5 ft 11 in)
- Position: Defender

Team information
- Current team: Hoi Fan
- Number: 23

Youth career
- Guangzhou Youth

Senior career*
| Years | Team | Apps | (Gls) |
| 2000–2001 | Guangzhou Ucan | | |
| 2002–2010 | Guangzhou F.C. | 108 | (5) |
| 2011– | Hoi Fan | | |
- * Club domestic league appearances and goals as of 30 October 2010

Huang Zhiyi (Chinese: 黄志毅) (born February 3, 1981) is a Chinese footballer, who currently plays for Hoi Fan.

== Honours ==
Guangzhou F.C.

- China League One: 2007, 2010
