= Cao Zhijie =

Chinese football player

Cao Zhijie 曹志杰
Personal information
- Date of birth: 7 January 1983 (age 43)
- Place of birth: Guangzhou, Guangdong, China
- Height: 1.75 m (5 ft 9 in)
- Position: Midfielder

Youth career
- Guangzhou Pharmaceutical

Senior career*
Years	Team	Apps	(Gls)
2003–2009	Guangzhou Pharmaceutical	14	(0)
2003–2005	→ Xiangxue Pharmaceutical (loan)		
2011	Hoi Fan		
- * Club domestic league appearances and goals as of 1 December 2009

Cao Zhijie (Chinese:曹志杰; born 7 January 1983) is a Chinese football player.

On 2 July 2009, Cao made his first and only appearance in the Chinese Super League in a 0–0 away draw against Qingdao Jonoon.

== Career statistics ==
Statistics accurate as of match played 1 January 2010.

Club performance			League		Cup		League Cup		Continental		Total	
Season	Club	League	Apps	Goals	Apps	Goals	Apps	Goals	Apps	Goals	Apps	Goals
China PR			League		FA Cup		CSL Cup		Asia		Total	
2003	Guangzhou Pharmaceutical	China League One	0	0			-		-		0	0
2004	Guangzhou Pharmaceutical	China League One	9	0			-		-		9	0
2005	Guangzhou Pharmaceutical	China League One	1	0			-		-		1	0
2006	Guangzhou Pharmaceutical	China League One	1	0			-		-		1	0
2007	Guangzhou Pharmaceutical	China League One	2	0	-		-		-		2	0
2008	Guangzhou Pharmaceutical	Chinese Super League	0	0	-		-		-		0	0
2009	Guangzhou Pharmaceutical	Chinese Super League	1	0	-		-		-		1	0
Total	China PR		14	0	0	0	0	0	0	0	14	0

== Honours ==
Guangzhou Pharmaceutical

- China League One: 2007
