= Xiamen Blue Lions F.C. =

Chinese football club

Xiamen Blue Lions Xiàmén Lánshī E-mng Na-sai 厦门蓝狮
- Full name: Xiamen Blue Lions
- Nickname(s): Blue Lions
- Founded: 1996; 29 years ago
- Dissolved: 2008; 17 years ago
- Ground: Xiamen Sports Centre Stadium, Xiamen, Fujian, China
- Capacity: 32,000
- League: Chinese Super League
- 2007: Chinese Super League, 15th (Relegated)
Home colours	Away colours

Xiamen Blue Lions Football Club (simplified Chinese: 厦门蓝狮; traditional Chinese: 廈門藍獅; pinyin: Xiàmén Lánshī; Pe̍h-ōe-jī: E-mng Na-sai) is a defunct Chinese football club, which was located in Xiamen, Fujian. It was founded in the 1996 league season and their nickname was the "Blue Lions" while they played in the Xiamen Sports Centre Stadium. Throughout their history they would twice win promotion to the top tier of Chinese football and play in the Chinese Super League. When the club was relegated at the end of 2007 league season they disbanded.

== History ==
On February 23, 1996, Xiamen FC was created to take part in the recently fully professionalised Chinese football league system where they started in the third division. At the beginning of the 1998 league season the club would take over second-tier football club Foshan Fosti F.C. and take their position within the division. With their new manager Chi Shangbin coming in and the investment from Lai Changxing the club would start to flourish and go on to win the second tier title at the end of the 1999 league season. The following season, however was to prove to be a disaster when Lai Changxing became implicated in corruption and his involvement within the club came under severe scrutiny. While the club wasn't involved within any corruption their performance throughout the season still saw them relegated and the management left. The next several seasons would see the team remain within the second tier and while they would actually go on to win the 2002 division title there wasn't any promotion allowed during that season and they would have to remain within the division. With the introduction of new head coach Gao Hongbo at the beginning of the 2004 league season the club would show consistent promotion ambitions and would eventually go on to win the 2005 division title. Now playing in the Chinese Super League the team would establish themselves within the division and finish mid-table, eighth within the league. Gao Hongbo would attract the attentions of ambitious club Changchun Yatai and leave the team at the end of the season. This saw Xiamen slip down the table, finish bottom of the league and then get relegated. The team would decide to disband at the end of the season, though they would wait until March 2008 to officially disband at the beginning of the 2008 league season.

== Name history ==
- 1996–97: Xiamen Yincheng (厦门银城)
- 1998: Xiamen Fairwiell (厦门远华)
- 1999: Xiamen FC (厦门队)
- 2000: Xiamen Xiaxin (厦门厦新)
- 2001–03: Xiamen Hongshi (厦门红狮)
- 2003.10.2 – 2004: Xiamen Jixiang Shishi (厦门吉祥石狮)
- 2004.5.18 – 2008: Xiamen Blue Lions (厦门蓝狮)

== Honours ==
- Chinese Jia B League/Chinese League One (tier-II)
  - Champions (3): 1999, 2002, 2005

== Results ==
- As of the end of 2008 season

League rankings before 1993

Season	1996	1997	1998	1999	2000	2001	2002	2003	2004	2005	2006	2007
Division	3	3	2	2	1	2	2	2	2	2	1	1
Position	6	4^{1}	6	1	13	6	1	12	3	1	8	15

- ^1 in group stage
