= Ye Zhibin =

Chinese footballer and coach

Ye Zhibin 叶志彬
Personal information
- Date of birth: July 12, 1972 (age 54)
- Place of birth: Guangzhou, Guangdong, China
- Height: 1.77 m (5 ft 10 in)
- Position: Midfielder

Team information
- Current team: Guangdong Sunray Cave (assistant)

Youth career
- Guangzhou Team

Senior career*
Years	Team	Apps	(Gls)
1993–1994	Happy Valley		
1994–1997	Guangzhou Songri		
1998–2003	Guangzhou Apollo		

Managerial career
- 2004–2006: Guangzhou Rizhiquan youth team
- 2007–2010: Guangzhou Pharmaceutical (fitness coach)
- 2010: Guangzhou Pharmaceutical ((assistant))
- 2011: Guangzhou City Transport
- 2012: Guangdong Sunray Cave ((assistant))
- * Club domestic league appearances and goals

Ye Zhibin (Chinese: 叶志彬; born October 3, 1971) is a Chinese assistant coach and a former professional football player. As a player, he spent his career playing for Guangzhou Songri and Guangzhou Apollo before moving into management where he spent several years with Guangzhou Pharmaceutical in numerous coaching positions before moving on to become an assistant coach at Guangdong Sunray Cave.

== Playing career ==
Ye Zhibin would play for his local second-tier football club Guangzhou Songri and was part of the squad that won promotion to the top tier at the end of the 1995 league season when the club came second within the division. His time in the top tier was short lived and by the end of the 1996 league season the club finished bottom of the league and received subsequent relegation at the end of the season. When the club were unable to win immediate promotion back into the top tier the following season, Ye Zhibin was allowed to leave to join local rivals and top-tier club Guangzhou Apollo at the beginning of the 1998 league season. In his short time at the club Ye quickly gained a reputation as tough tackling midfielder when on May 10, 1998, in a game against Shanghai Shenhua, Ye would fracture of the left leg of Claudio Lucio de Camargo, Moura and end the players career within China. By the end of the 1998 league season Guangzhou Apollo would finish bottom of the league and were relegated to the second tier. Li would remain faithful to the club and stayed with them until he retired at the end of the 2003 league season.

== Coaching career ==
After ending his playing career in 2003 he remained at Guangzhou Apollo where he was offered a youth team coaching position at the now renamed Guangzhou Rizhiquan in 2004. After taking different positions at the now renamed Guangzhou Pharmaceutical, Li would take on his first senior management position with Guangzhou City Transport and he led them into the National City Games. After the tournament finished Li would take an assistant coaching position at Guangdong Sunray Cave.
