= Wen Xiaoming =

Chinese footballer (born 1979)

Wen Xiaoming 温小明
Personal information
- Date of birth: April 8, 1979 (age 47)
- Place of birth: Guangzhou, China
- Height: 1.76 m (5 ft 9 in)
- Position: Striker

Senior career*
Years	Team	Apps	(Gls)
1999–2000	Guangzhou Songri	40	(4)
2001–2008	Guangzhou Pharmaceutical		(24)
- * Club domestic league appearances and goals as of March 28, 2009

Wen Xiaoming (Chinese: 温小明; pinyin: Wēn Xiǎomíng; Mandarin pronunciation: [wə́n.ɕjàʊ mǐŋ]; born April 8, 1979) is a Chinese former footballer who predominantly played for Guangzhou Pharmaceutical. After eight years at the club he retired at the end of season 2008 because of a knee injury.

== Club career ==
Wen Xiaoming started his career with top tier club Guangzhou Songri; however in his debut season he was part of the team that saw the club relegated at the end of the 1999 Chinese league campaign. While he remained with the team he was unable to aid them win promotion and the club dissolved at the end of the season due to financial reasons. Wen would then move to local rivals Guangzhou Pharmaceutical where he went on to establish himself as regular within the team and was part of the squad that won the 2007 division title and promotion into the top tier. His return to the top tier, however did not last very long and he sustained a knee injury during the 2008 league campaign which forced him to retire at the end of the season.

== Honours ==
Guangzhou Pharmaceutical

- China League One: 2007
