= Tang Dechao =

Chinese footballer

Tang Dechao 唐德超
Personal information
- Date of birth: February 9, 1985 (age 41)
- Place of birth: Guangzhou, Guangdong, China
- Height: 1.87 m (6 ft 2 in)
- Position: Defender

Youth career
- 2002–2005: Guangzhou F.C.

Senior career*
Years	Team	Apps	(Gls)
2002–2003	Xiangxue Pharmaceutical	0	(0)
2004–2005	Sunray Cave	21	(3)
2005–2013	Guangzhou Evergrande	74	(6)
2013–2015	Henan Jianye	21	(1)
2015–2020	Meizhou Kejia	56	(1)
- * Club domestic league appearances and goals as of 31 December 2020

Tang Dechao (Chinese: 唐德超; pinyin: Táng Déchāo; born February 9, 1984) is a Chinese former football player. He represented Xiangxue Pharmaceutical, Sunray Cave, Guangzhou Evergrande, Henan Jianye and Meizhou Kejia throughout his playing career and was the first and only player to win all domestic trophies in China, including Chinese Super League, China League One, China League Two, Chinese FA Cup and Chinese FA Super Cup.

== Club career ==
Tang Dechao started his football career playing for the Guangzhou F.C.'s youth team before being promoted to the club's satellite team Xiangxue Pharmaceutical who were allowed to play during the 2002-03 season in the Hong Kong First Division League. The following season he was allowed to stay in Hong Kong and played for Sunray Cave for a season before he returned to Guangzhou.

Tang played for Guangzhou Evergrande between 2005 and 2013.

He transferred to China League One side Henan Jianye in July 2013.

In July 2015, Tang transferred to China League Two side Meizhou Kejia. After helping Meizhou win 2015 League Two champions, he became first and only player to win all domestic trophies in China, including Super League, League One, League Two, Chinese FA Cup and Chinese FA Super Cup.

== Career statistics ==
Statistics accurate as of match played 31 December 2020.

Club	Season	League			National Cup		League Cup		Continental		Total	
Club	Season	Division	Apps	Goals	Apps	Goals	Apps	Goals	Apps	Goals	Apps	Goals
Xiangxue Pharmaceutical	2002–03	First Division League	0	0	0	0	0	0	-		0	0
Sunray Cave	2004–05	First Division League	21	3	0	0	2 (Note: Appearances in Hong Kong Senior Challenge Shield)	1	-		21	3
Guangzhou Evergrande	2005	China League One	10	2	2	1	-		-		12	3
Guangzhou Evergrande	2006	China League One	16	1	1	0	-		-		17	1
Guangzhou Evergrande	2007	China League One	1	0	-		-		-		1	0
Guangzhou Evergrande	2008	Chinese Super League	13	1	-		-		-		13	1
Guangzhou Evergrande	2009	Chinese Super League	7	1	-		-		-		7	1
Guangzhou Evergrande	2010	China League One	19	1	-		-		-		19	1
Guangzhou Evergrande	2011	Chinese Super League	1	0	0	0	-		-		1	0
Guangzhou Evergrande	2012	Chinese Super League	7	0	2	0	-		0	0	9	0
Guangzhou Evergrande	2013	Chinese Super League	0	0	0	0	-		0	0	0	0
Guangzhou Evergrande	Total		74	6	5	1	0	0	0	0	79	7
Henan Jianye	2013	China League One	14	1	0	0	-		-		14	1
Henan Jianye	2014	Chinese Super League	3	0	0	0	-		-		3	0
Henan Jianye	2015	Chinese Super League	4	0	1	0	-		-		5	0
Henan Jianye	Total		21	1	1	0	0	0	0	0	22	1
Meizhou Kejia	2015	China League Two	12	0	0	0	-		-		12	0
Meizhou Kejia	2016	China League One	15	0	2	0	-		-		17	0
Meizhou Kejia	2017	China League One	17	1	1	0	-		-		18	1
Meizhou Kejia	2018	China League One	3	0	1	0	-		-		4	0
Meizhou Kejia	2019	China League One	9	0	1	0	-		-		10	0
Meizhou Kejia	2020	China League One	0	0	0	0	-		-		0	0
Meizhou Kejia	Total		56	1	5	0	0	0	0	0	61	1
Career total			172	11	11	1	2	1	0	0	185	13

== Honours ==
=== Club ===
Guangzhou Evergrande

- Chinese Super League: 2011, 2012
- China League One: 2007, 2010
- Chinese FA Cup: 2012
- Chinese FA Super Cup: 2012

Henan Jianye

- China League One: 2013

Meizhou Kejia

- China League Two: 2015
