= Li Zhihai =

Chinese footballer

Li Zhihai 李志海
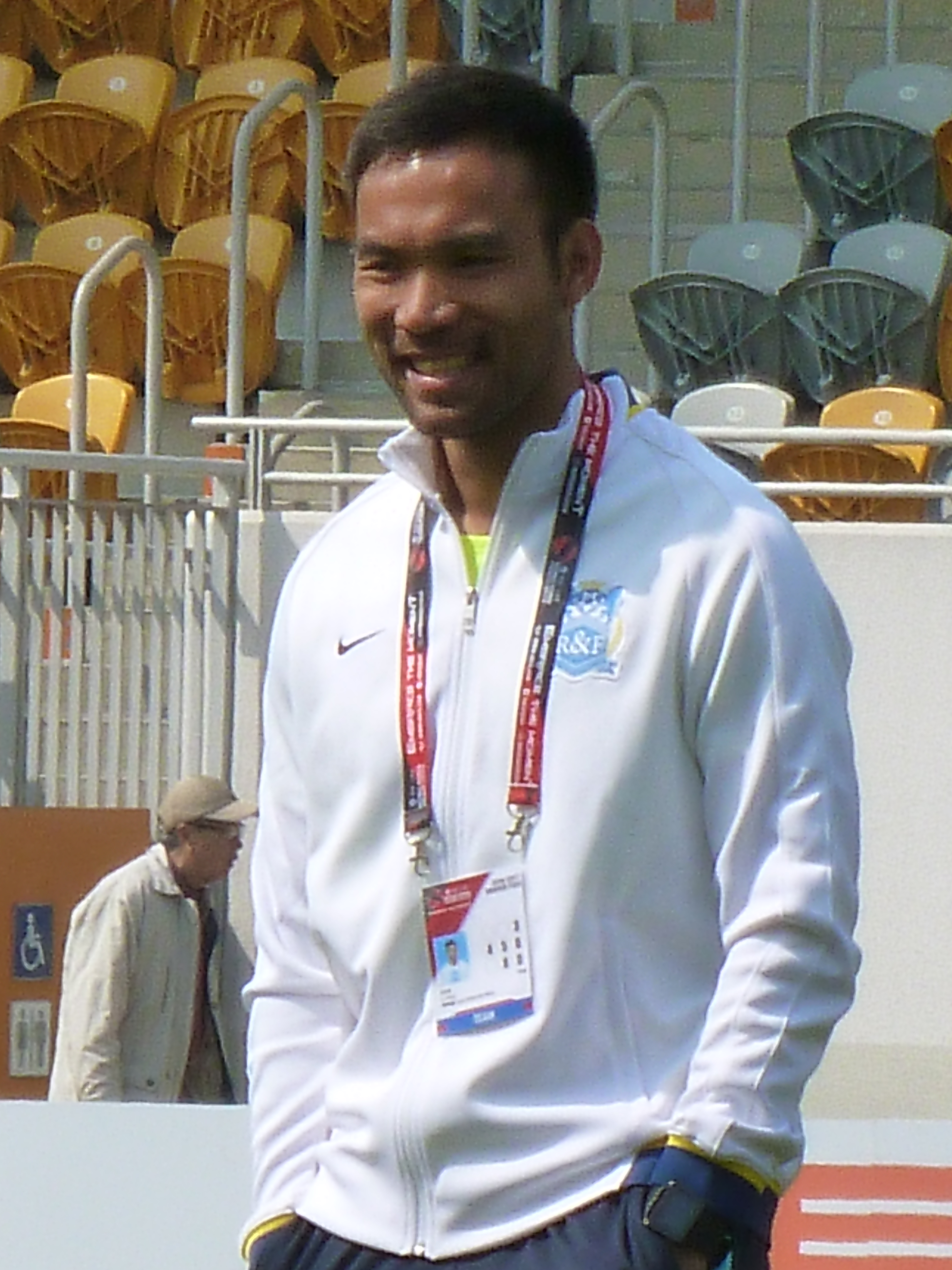
- Li in 2017

Personal information
- Date of birth: 2 August 1982 (age 44)
- Place of birth: Qingyuan, Guangdong, China
- Height: 1.84 m (6 ft 0 in)
- Position: Defender

Team information
- Current team: Guangzhou Glorious

Youth career
- 1998–2001: Guangzhou Youth

Senior career*
Years	Team	Apps	(Gls)
2000–2001	Guangzhou Ucan		
2002–2010	Guangzhou F.C.	151	(7)
2011	Guangdong Sunray Cave	16	(0)
2012	Lam Ieng	4	(2)
2012	Shenzhen Main Sports	2	(0)
2012	Lam Ieng	2	(0)
2012	Guangdong Sunray Cave	5	(0)
2013	Chao Pak Kei	1	(0)
2013	Guangdong Sunray Cave	1	(0)
2017	Zhaoqing Hengtai		
2017–	Guangzhou Glorious		

Managerial career
- 2016–2017: R&F (Hong Kong)
- * Club domestic league appearances and goals

Li Zhihai (Chinese: 李志海; pinyin: Li Zhìhǎi; born 2 August 1982) is a Chinese former professional footballer who played as a defender.

== Playing career ==
Li Zhihai joined second-tier club Guangzhou F.C. senior team at the beginning of the 2002 league season and steadily established himself as a regular within the squad. Over the following seasons he became a vital member of the team and was awarded with the club captaincy where he led the team to a division championship and promotion to the Chinese Super League with Guangzhou at the end of the 2007 league season. The following season, he led Guangzhou to a 7th-place finish at the end of the 2008 league season despite missing much of the campaign through injury. The next season saw Li Zhihai miss eight games due to suspension after he fought with Tianjin Teda F.C. player Éber Luís Cucchi during a 25 June 2008 league game. After missing much of the 2008 league season through suspension, Li Zhihai once again struggled with injury through much of the 2009 league season and lose the captaincy to Xu Liang. At the end of the season, the club was relegated after it was discovered that the club had fixed a match during the 2007 league campaign. Despite the relegation, Li Zhihai stayed with the club to help in their push for promotion.

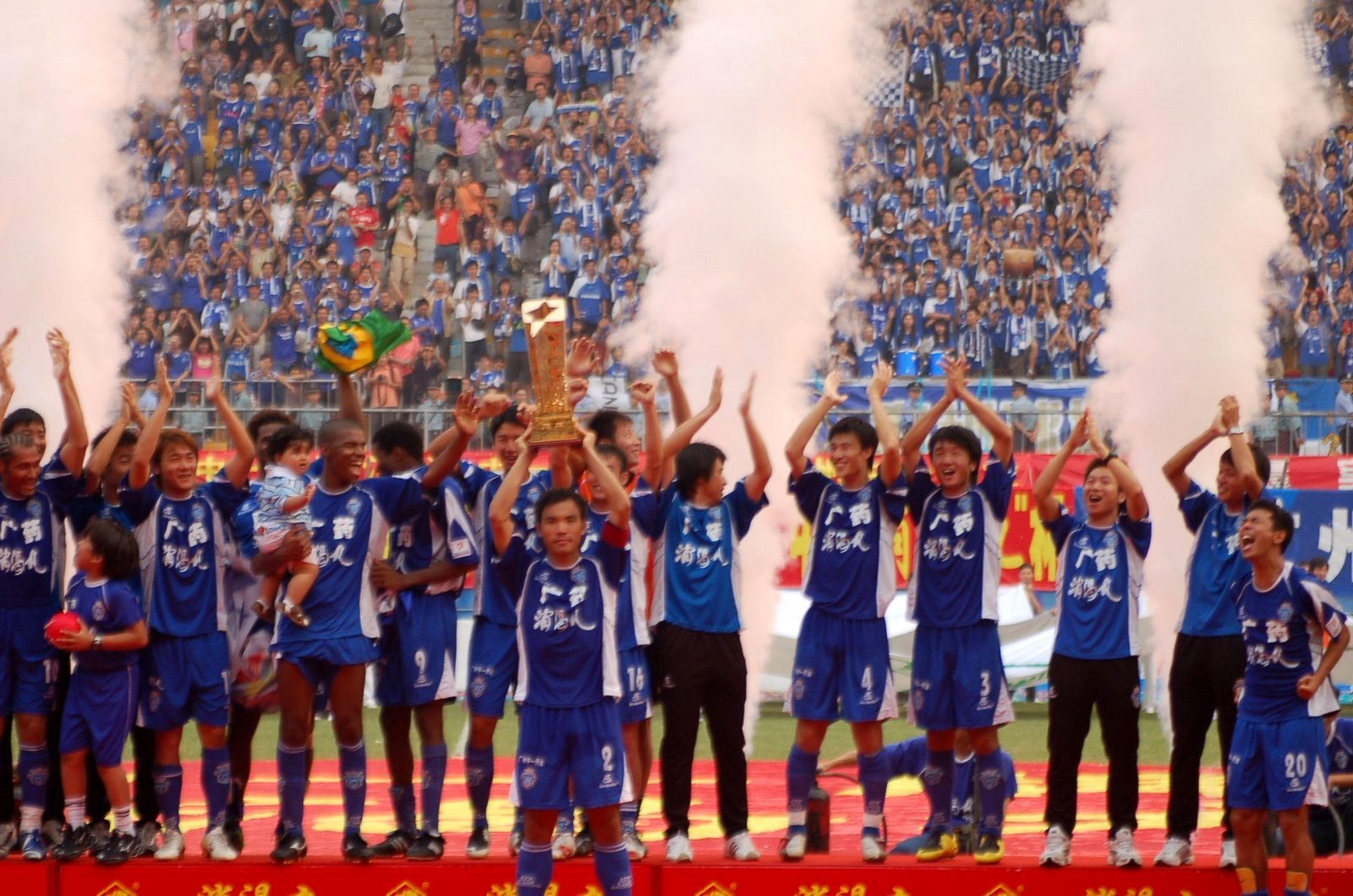
Li Zhihai captained Guangzhou to win China League One for the first time in 2007

At the start of the 2010 league campaign, Guangzhou brought in a new manager in Lee Jang-Soo who decided to bring in several new players, which saw Li Zhihai often sitting on the bench and despite helping the team win promotion back to the top tier at the end of the season was allowed to leave for second-tier football club Guangdong Sunray Cave at the beginning of the 2011 league campaign. Li was promoted to the team captain in this season. However, he was suspected by the club to be involved in match-fixing after his disastrous performance in a league match which Guangdong played against Shanghai East Asia in September. Although Li claimed that the charge was without evidence, he was released by Guangdong at the end of the season.

In April 2012, after spending a brief time in Macau's Campeonato da 1ª Divisão do Futebol club Lam Ieng, Li moved to China League Two club Shenzhen Main Sports on a free transfer. Li returned to Guangdong Sunray Cave who suffered defend crisis in the 2012 league season in June. He was lined up in his first returning match and insured a 2–0 away victory against Beijing Baxy on 23 June. However, he was dropped from the first team again in July after Guangdong lost to Hohhot Dongjin 4–0. Li was signed by Campeonato da 1ª Divisão do Futebol club Chao Pak Kei in January 2013. He made his debut for Chao Pak Kei in a 5–0 home defeat against Lam Ieng on 20 January. He returned to Guangdong Sunray Cave again in February. Li retired in the end of 2013 season and became the assistant coach of Guangdong Sunray Cave. He played as an amateur player for Zhaoqing Hengtai in his spare time.

== Managerial career ==
Li joined Guangzhou R&F's youth team staff in 2016. In August 2016, Li was appointed as the manager of Hong Kong Premier League side R&F, which was the satellite team of Guangzhou R&F. He led the club to finish in tenth place in the 2016–17 Hong Kong Premier League, which secured R&F's stay in the top flight for the next season.

== Managerial statistics ==
As of 6 May 2017.

Team	Nat	From	To	Record				
Team	Nat	From	To	G	W	D	L	Win %
R&F	Hong Kong	July 2016	May 2017	23	3	1	19	13.04
Total				23	3	1	19	13.04

== Honours ==
Guangzhou F.C.

- China League One: 2007, 2010
