= Shen Xiangfu =

Chinese football coach (born 1957)

Shen Xiangfu 沈祥福
Personal information
- Full name: Shen Xiangfu
- Date of birth: May 27, 1957 (age 69)
- Place of birth: Beijing, China
- Position: Winger

Youth career
- 1973–1974: Beijing Youth Football Team

Senior career*
Years	Team	Apps	(Gls)
1974–1987	Beijing Team		
1988–1991	Fujitsu		

International career
1977–1986	China	37	(7)

Managerial career
- 1991–1993: Fujitsu (assistant)
- 1994–1995: Fujitsu
- 1996–1997: Beijing Guoan (assistant)
- 1997–1998: Beijing Guoan
- 2000–2001: China U-20
- 2001–2002: China (caretaker)
- 2002–2004: China U-23
- 2005–2006: Beijing Guoan
- 2007–2009: Guangzhou Pharmaceutical
- 2010–2011: Changchun Yatai
- 2012: Henan Jianye
- 2013–2016: Shanghai Shenhua
- 2016-2018: Tianjin Quanjian (assistant)
- 2018: Tianjin Quanjian (caretaker)
- 2019: Tianjin Tianhai
Medal record
Men's football
Representing China
Asian Games
Bronze medal – third place	1978 Bangkok	Football
- * Club domestic league appearances and goals

Shen Xiangfu (Chinese: 沈祥福; pinyin: Shěn Xiángfú; Mandarin pronunciation: [ʂə̀n.ɕjáŋ.fǔ]; born May 27, 1957, in Beijing) is a Chinese football coach as well as also being a former international football player. As a player, he was associated with the Beijing Team and Fujitsu before moving into management where he went back to manage both his previous clubs before joining the China national team set-up for several years. When he returned to club management he would guide Guangzhou Pharmaceutical to the 2007 China League One title before having spells at Changchun Yatai and Henan Jianye.

== Playing career ==
As a player, Shen distinguished himself as a right-footed left winger and worked his way up from the Beijing Youth Football Team to their senior team. He would become one of the key players in the China national team during his career representing them in the 1980 AFC Asian Cup, however that was the only tournament he experienced because his subsequent call-ups saw China failed to qualify for the World Cup both times when Shen was a member of the China national football team. The 1986 World Cup qualification personally took its toll on him when he quit briefly after losing to Hong Kong on May 19, 1985 in a vital game that saw China knocked out of the tournament. While he did return to the national team he would concentrate more on his club career and was later chosen by the Chinese Football Association to go to Japan and joined the Fujitsū Football Team first as a player, then as an assistant coach and then finally as their head coach.

== Management career ==
Shen was back to the spotlight of Chinese football when he joined Beijing Guoan and served under Jin Zhiyang as an assistant coach in 1997. Shen took over most of the coaching in the middle of the season, since Jin was summoned to the China national football team to assist Qi Wusheng. In 1998, Shen was named the head coach of Beijing Guoan and Jin left the club to assist the newly installed head coach of the China national football team Bobby Houghton. Shen was able to lead the club to finish third in the 1998 Jia A, but the next year Beijing Guoan showed a poorer quality and finished sixth in the league. The result was the worst one for the club since 1995. Shen was replaced at the end of the season.

The Chinese Football Association was looking to secure a younger generation and native coach for the China National youth teams that included the U-19, 21, 23 Football Teams. Shen accepted the new head coach job and occasionally he would also assist Bora Milutinović who was invited by the Chinese Football Association as the new head coach of the national football team. The U-19 team of Shen Xiangfu was expected to be a very promising generation of Chinese football and in the beginning the team had indeed shown many positive signs. In the end, the team could not qualify the 2004 Summer Olympics and Shen was dismissed.

Meanwhile, Beijing Guoan was also not in a good shape in the recently formed Chinese Super League. The club despite a short revival in 2002 did not progress as much the fans and the investors expected. In 2005, Shen re-joined the club and was named head coach again. The club finished sixth at the end of 2005 season, slightly better than the previous year. The following year, Shen directed the club into a very defensive style. In spite of some angry fans who saw defense as a sign of weakness, the club finished third at the end of the season. Nevertheless, Shen was under a lot of pressure and was exhausted. After the last match, he resigned. Shen wouldn't wait long before returning into management when he took over second-tier side Guangzhou Pharmaceutical and aided them to a division title and promotion. After several seasons with Guangzhou he would attract the interests of Changchun Yatai and join them at the beginning of the 2010 league season.

== International goals ==
No.	Date	Venue	Opponent	Score	Result	Competition
1.	18 October 1981	Beijing, China	Kuwait	3–0	3–0	1982 FIFA World Cup qualification

== Honours ==
=== Player ===
Beijing Guoan

- Chinese Jia-A League: 1977 (Runners-up)

=== Manager ===
Beijing Guoan

- Chinese Super League Cup: 1998

Guangzhou Pharmaceutical

- China League One: 2007
