= Guangzhou Pharmaceuticals =

Chinese pharmaceutical company

Guangzhou Pharmaceuticals Corporation
- Company type: Joint venture
- Industry: Pharmaceuticals
- Founded: 1951 (foundation); 2008 (as a joint venture with Alliance Boots)
- Headquarters: Guangzhou, Guangdong, China
- Area served: China
- Key people: Jinghui Yu (President)
- Revenue: RMB 16.9 billion
- Owner: Walgreens Boots Alliance (50%); Guangzhou Pharmaceutical Holdings (50%)
- Website: www.gzmpc.com/index_en.php

Guangzhou Pharmaceuticals Corporation (广州医药集团) is a pharmaceutical wholesaling and distribution company headquartered in Guangzhou, China, and a 50:50 joint venture between Walgreens Boots Alliance and Guangzhou Pharmaceutical Holdings Limited. It is the third-largest pharmaceutical wholesaler in China measured by revenues.

Guangzhou Pharmaceuticals wholesales prescription drugs, over-the-counter drugs, medical devices, chemical reagents, experiment equipment and glass wares.

== History ==
Guangzhou Pharmaceuticals Corporation was founded in 1951. In January 2007 Alliance Boots agreed to acquire a 50 percent interest in Guangzhou Pharmaceuticals Corporation for £38 million, making it a 50:50 joint venture with Guangzhou Pharmaceutical Co., Ltd.
