= 2012 Guangzhou Evergrande F.C. season =

Guangzhou Evergrande 2012
- Chairman: Liu Yongzhuo
- Manager: Lee Jang-Soo (to 16 May); Marcello Lippi (from 17 May)
- Stadium: Tianhe Stadium
- Super League: 1st
- FA Cup: Winners
- FA Super Cup: Winners
- AFC Champions League: Quarter-finals
- Top goalscorer: League: Muriqui (12 goals); All: Darío Conca (17 goals)
- Highest home attendance: 47,869 vs Jeonbuk Hyundai Motors; 1 May 2012 (Champions League)
- Lowest home attendance: 28,128 vs Henan Jianye; 18 July 2012 (FA Cup)
- Average home league attendance: league: 37,250 all: 37,265
Home colours	Away colours

The 2012 Guangzhou Evergrande season is the 59th year in Guangzhou Evergrande's existence and is its 45th season in the Chinese football league, also its 23rd season in the top flight. The club played in the AFC Champions League for the first time in club's history after winning the league title in the 2011 season.

== Review ==
- 26 December 2011, Guangzhou confirmed that they had signed Zhao Xuri, Rong Hao, Li Jianbin and Peng Xinli for a total report fee of ¥30 million.
- 10 January 2012, Chinese midfielder Qin Sheng moved from Liaoning Whowin to Guangzhou with an undisclosed fee.
- 25 February 2012, Guangzhou beat Tianjin Teda 2–1 in the 2012 Chinese FA Super Cup, winning this trophy for the first time in the club's history. Cléo scored both goals of the match.
- 7 March 2012, Guangzhou beat K-League champions Jeonbuk Hyundai Motors 5–1 away in the club's first AFC Champions League match.
- 2 May 2012, Guangzhou Evergrande announced that they had signed Lucas Barrios from German Bundesliga side Borussia Dortmund on a four-year deal for a domestic record fee of €8.5 million.
- 4 May 2012, Darío Conca received a ban of at least 9 matches (including reserve league match) and was fined ¥1 million by the club for his remarks about the team manager Lee Jang-Soo's decision on Weibo.
- 15 May 2012, Guangzhou beat Buriram United 2–1 and advanced to the knockout phase of AFC Champions League.
- 17 May 2012, former Italian World Cup-winning football manager Marcello Lippi was appointed as the new manager of club, signing a two-and-a-half-year deal.
- 30 May 2012, Guangzhou beat J-League side FC Tokyo 1–0 in the Round of 16 of AFC Champions League, and became the first Chinese club to reach the quarterfinals of the AFC Champions League since 2006.
- 20 June 2012, CFA committee voted to pass a rule change allowing CSL clubs, who were still competing in the AFC Champions League, to add two more foreign players. Guangzhou Evergrande would be the only club able to take advantage out of the new rule change in the 2012 league season.
- 2 July 2012, Guangzhou Evergrande announced that they had signed South Korea national team defender Kim Young-Gwon on a four-year deal with a fee of US$2.5 million.
- 3 July 2012, Muriqui signed a new contract with Guangzhou Evergrande, keeping him at the club until 30 June 2016.
- 7 July 2012, Huang Bowen transferred to Guangzhou from K-League side Jeonbuk Hyundai Motors with a reported fee of US$2 million.
- 15 July 2012, Guangzhou Evergrande lost to Guangzhou R&F 0–1 at Tianhe Stadium, which ended club's record 34-league-home-match unbeaten run, as well as record 36-league-home-match scoring run.
- 2 October 2012, Guangzhou Evergrande was knocked out of the AFC Champions League in the quarter-finals by Al Ittihad 5–4 on aggregate.
- 27 October 2012, Guangzhou Evergrande won the league title for the second time in two years after beating Liaoning Whowin 1–0, with Gao Lin scoring the winning goal at the 90' minute to seal the title.
- 18 November 2012, Guangzhou Evergrande won their first Chinese FA Cup title, defeating Guizhou Renhe by a score of 4–2, on aggregate 5–3.

== Players ==
=== First team squad ===
Note: Flags indicate national team as defined under FIFA eligibility rules; some limited exceptions apply. Players may hold more than one non-FIFA nationality.

No.	Pos.	Nation	Player
1	GK	CHN	Yang Jun
2	DF	CHN	Tu Dongxu
3	DF	BRA	Paulão
4	DF	CHN	Rong Hao
5	DF	CHN	Zhang Linpeng
6	DF	CHN	Feng Xiaoting
7	MF	CHN	Feng Junyan
8	MF	CHN	Qin Sheng
9	FW	BRA	Cléo
10	MF	CHN	Zheng Zhi (captain)
11	MF	BRA	Muriqui
12	GK	CHN	Dong Chunyu
13	DF	CHN	Tang Dechao
14	DF	CHN	Li Jianhua
15	MF	ARG	Darío Conca
16	MF	KOR	Cho Won-Hee
17	FW	CHN	Gao Zhilin
18	FW	PAR	Lucas Barrios
19	DF	CHN	Li Jianbin

No.	Pos.	Nation	Player
20	FW	CHN	Ni Bo
21	FW	CHN	Jiang Ning
22	GK	CHN	Li Shuai
23	MF	CHN	Li Zhilang
24	MF	CHN	Shi Hongjun
25	MF	CHN	Peng Xinli
26	MF	CHN	Wu Pingfeng
27	FW	CHN	Ye Weichao
28	DF	KOR	Kim Young-Gwon
29	FW	CHN	Gao Lin
30	MF	CHN	Peng Shaoxiong
31	DF	CHN	Zhang Hongnan
32	DF	CHN	Sun Xiang
33	MF	CHN	Li Yan
35	FW	CHN	Memet Ali
37	MF	CHN	Zhao Xuri
39	MF	CHN	Tan Jiajun
42	MF	CHN	Huang Bowen
48	GK	CHN	Zhi Xinhua

=== Reserve squad ===
Note: Flags indicate national team as defined under FIFA eligibility rules; some limited exceptions apply. Players may hold more than one non-FIFA nationality.

No.	Pos.	Nation	Player
34	DF	CHN	Huang Jiaqiang
36	FW	CHN	Gao Shunhang
38	DF	CHN	Zhang Yujia
43	MF	CHN	Li Bin

=== Out on loan ===
Note: Flags indicate national team as defined under FIFA eligibility rules; some limited exceptions apply. Players may hold more than one non-FIFA nationality.

No.	Pos.	Nation	Player
—	MF	BRA	Renato Cajá (at Ponte Preta from 1 July 2011 to 31 May 2012)
—	DF	CHN	Chen Jianlong (at Shanghai Shenxin from 5 January 2012 to 31 December 2012)
—	MF	BRA	Renato Cajá (at Kashima Antlers from 1 July 2012 to 1 January 2013)
33	MF	CHN	Li Yan (at Guangzhou R&F from 11 July 2012 to 8 November 2012)

== Technical staff ==
Name	Nat.	Job title
Marcello Lippi	(Italy)	Head coach (from 17 May 2012)
Narciso Pezzotti	(Italy)	Assistant coaches (from 17 May 2012)
Massimiliano Maddaloni	(Italy)	Assistant coaches (from 17 May 2012)
Li Tie	(China)	Assistant coach (from 26 May 2012)
Michelangelo Rampulla	(Italy)	Goalkeeping coach (from 17 May 2012)
Claudio Gaudino	(Italy)	Fitness coach (from 17 May 2012)
Peng Weiguo	(China)	Reserve team coach (from 21 May 2012)
Enrico Castellacci	(Italy)	Medical adviser (from 27 July 2012)
Silvano Cotti	(Italy)	Team doctor / Physiotherapist (from 27 July 2012)
Georg Meyer	(Germany)	Physiotherapist
Liu Shulai	(China)	Team doctors
Kang Kebao	(China)	Team doctors
Wang Shucheng	(China)	Team doctors
Franco Ceravolo	(Italy)	Chief scout (from 5 September 2012)
Lee Jang-Soo	(South Korea)	Head coach (to 16 May 2012)
Qiu Ming	(China)	Assistant coaches (to 16 May 2012)
Kim Yong-Kab	(South Korea)	Assistant coaches (to 16 May 2012)
Lee Min-Sung	(South Korea)	Assistant coaches (to 16 May 2012)
Wang Weiman	(China)	Goalkeeping coach (to 16 May 2012)
Jiang Feng	(China)	Fitness coach (to 16 May 2012)
Qu Shengqing	(China)	Reserve team coach (to 16 May 2012)
Kim Hyo-Jung	(South Korea)	Technical analyst (to 16 May 2012)

== Transfers ==
=== Winter ===
In:

No.	Pos.	Nation	Player
4	DF	CHN	Rong Hao (from Hangzhou Greentown)
8	MF	CHN	Qin Sheng (from Liaoning Whowin)
19	DF	CHN	Li Jianbin (from Chengdu Blades)
25	MF	CHN	Peng Xinli (from Chengdu Blades)
35	FW	CHN	Memet Ali (from Xinjiang FA)
37	MF	CHN	Zhao Xuri (from Shaanxi Chanba)

Out:

No.	Pos.	Nation	Player
18	DF	CHN	Chen Jianlong (loan to Nanchang Hengyuan)
19	MF	CHN	Yang Hao (to Shaanxi Chanba)
25	MF	CHN	Yang Yihu (to Shaanxi Chanba)
35	DF	CHN	Guo Zichao (to Guangdong Sunray Cave)
39	DF	CHN	Zhang Tianlong (to Shenzhen Ruby)
40	DF	CHN	Pan Weiye (to Shenzhen Main)

=== Summer ===
In:

No.	Pos.	Nation	Player
18	FW	PAR	Lucas Barrios (from (Germany) Borussia Dortmund)
28	DF	KOR	Kim Young-Gwon (from (Japan) Omiya Ardija)
42	MF	CHN	Huang Bowen (from (South Korea) Jeonbuk Hyundai Motors)
—	MF	BRA	Renato Cajá (loan return from (Brazil) Ponte Preta)

Out:

No.	Pos.	Nation	Player
33	MF	CHN	Li Yan (loan to Guangzhou R&F)
—	MF	BRA	Renato Cajá (loan to (Japan) Kashima Antlers)

== Pre-season and friendlies ==
=== Training matches ===
Date	Opponents	H / A	Result	Scorers
2012-01-14	(China) Dalian Aerbin	H	3–1	Memet Ali, Jiang Xiaochen (2 goals)
2012-01-17	(China) Guizhou Renhe	H	1–0	Gao Lin
2012-01-18	(China) Shenyang Dongjin	H	1–2	Tan Jiajun
2012-01-19	(China) Dalian Aerbin	H	2–0	Zheng Zhi, Liang Xueming
2012-01-27	(Spain) Cádiz	A	1–1	Muriqui
2012-01-28	(Hungary) Videoton	N	1–2	Jiang Ning
2012-01-31	(Georgia (country)) Dinamo Tbilisi	N	3–0	Cléo, Conca, Muriqui
2012-02-01	(Switzerland) FC Wil	N	1–2	Tan Jiajun
2012-02-04	(Ukraine) Dnipro Dnipropetrovsk	N	1–2	Ye Weichao
2012-02-07	(Spain) UD Marbella	A	0–1	
2012-02-19	(South Korea) Incheon United	H	2–2	Wu Pingfeng, Feng Junyan
2012-03-03	(South Korea) Myongji University	A	1–2	Shi Hongjun

=== Marbella Cup 2012 ===
3 February 2012	Guangzhou Evergrande (China)	1–0	(Russia) CSKA Moscow	Marbella, Spain
12:00 UTC+1	Qin Sheng 87'			Stadium: Estadio Municipal de Marbella

6 February 2012 Semi-final	Guangzhou Evergrande (China)	0–4	(Ukraine) Dynamo Kyiv	Marbella, Spain
16:00 UTC+1			Ideye 28' 55'; Yarmolenko 31'; Rybalka 90'	Stadium: Estadio Municipal de Marbella

9 February 2012 Third place match	Guangzhou Evergrande (China)	0–0 (3–5 p)	(Poland) Lech Poznań	Marbella, Spain
16:00 UTC+1				Stadium: Estadio Municipal de Marbella
	Penalties
	Cléo (penalty scored); Muriqui (penalty scored); Gao Lin (penalty scored); Sun Xiang (penalty missed)		(penalty scored) Wołąkiewicz; (penalty scored) Ubiparip; (penalty scored) Đurđević; (penalty scored) Możdżeń; (penalty scored) Drewniak

=== 2012 CSL All-Stars Game ===
7 November 2012	Guangzhou Evergrande	0–1	CSL All-Stars	Guangzhou
18:35 UTC+8			Liu Jianye 45'	Stadium: Tianhe Stadium; Referee: Tan Hai; Assistant referees: Su Jige, Mu Yuxin; Fourth official: Fan Qi

== Competitions ==
=== Overview ===
Competition	Started round	Final position / round	First match	Last match
Chinese FA Super Cup	—	Winners	25 February 2012	
Chinese Super League	—	1st	11 March 2012	3 November 2012
Chinese FA Cup	4th round	Winners	18 July 2012	18 November 2012
AFC Champions League	Group stage	Quarter-finals	7 March 2012	2 October 2012

Updated to match played 18 November 2012
Source: Competitions

=== Chinese Super League ===
==== League table ====
Pos	Team	Pld	W	D	L	GF	GA	GD	Pts	Qualification or relegation
1	Guangzhou Evergrande (C)	30	17	7	6	51	30	+21	58	2013 AFC Champions League group stage (Note: Guizhou Moutai qualified for the 2013 AFC Champions League because league champions Guangzhou Evergrande also won the 2012 Chinese FA Cup.)
2	Jiangsu Sainty	30	14	12	4	49	29	+20	54	2013 AFC Champions League group stage
3	Beijing Guoan	30	14	6	10	34	35	−1	48	2013 AFC Champions League group stage
4	Guizhou Moutai	30	12	9	9	44	33	+11	45	2013 AFC Champions League group stage
5	Dalian Aerbin	30	11	11	8	51	46	+5	44 (Note: Dalian 1–2 Changchun; Changchun 1–2 Dalian)	

Source: Chinese Super League (in Chinese)
Rules for classification: 1) points; 2) goal difference; 3) number of goals scored; 4) head-to-head goals scored; 5) goal difference; 6) goals scored; 7) disciplinary points (1 point for each yellow card, 3 points for each red card). Head-to-Head: Only used at the end of the season when two or more teams need the head-to-head rules to break a tie.
(C) Champions

==== Results summary ====
Overall								Home						Away					
Pld	W	D	L	GF	GA	GD	Pts	W	D	L	GF	GA	GD	W	D	L	GF	GA	GD
30	17	7	6	51	30	+21	58	11	3	1	33	13	+20	6	4	5	18	17	+1

Last updated: 3 November 2012.
Source: Competitive Matches

==== Results by round ====
Round	1	2	3	4	5	6	7	8	9	10	11	12	13	14	15	16	17	18	19	20	21	22	23	24	25	26	27	28	29	30
Ground	H	A	H	A	H	H	H	A	H	A	H	A	H	A	H	A	H	A	H	A	A	A	H	A	H	A	H	A	H	A
Result	W	L	W	W	D	W	W	W	W	L	W	D	W	W	W	D	L	W	D	L	W	W	D	D	W	L	W	D	W	L
Position	3	10	2	2	2	2	1	1	1	1	1	1	1	1	1	1	1	1	1	1	1	1	1	1	1	2	1	1	1	1

Updated to match(es) played on 3 November 2012. Source: Chinese Super League Table (in Chinese)
A = Away; H = Home; W = Win; D = Draw; L = Loss

==== Matches ====
Win Draw Loss

11 March 2012 Round 1	Guangzhou Evergrande	2–1	Shanghai Shenxin	Guangzhou
19:35 UTC+8	Conca 31'; Zhao Xuri (yellow card) 36'; Conca 44'; Zhang Linpeng (yellow card) 55'; Muriqui (yellow card) 73'; Zheng Zhi (yellow card) after match		Flávio 18'	Stadium: Tianhe Stadium; Attendance: 36,187; Referee: Li Haihe; Assistant referees: Li Dongnan, Liu Guiqing; Fourth official: Wang Jin

16 March 2012 Round 2	Guangzhou R&F	2–0	Guangzhou Evergrande	Guangzhou
18:00 UTC+8	Jumar (yellow card) 10'; Zhang Shuo 13' (pen.); Tang Miao (yellow card) 21'; Gao Zengxiang (yellow card) 33'; Li Zhe (yellow card) 70'; Lu Lin (yellow card) 73'; Zhang Yuan 83'		Paulão (yellow card) 12'; Zhang Linpeng (yellow card) 35'; Cho Won-Hee (yellow card) 47'; Zheng Zhi (yellow card) after match	Stadium: Yuexiushan Stadium; Attendance: 19,217; Referee: Sun Baojie; Assistant referees: Su Jige, Liu Guiqing; Fourth official: Zhao Zhizhi

25 March 2012 Round 3	Guangzhou Evergrande	3–0	Henan Jianye	Guangzhou
19:35 UTC+8	Cléo (penalty missed) 22'; Muriqui 30'; Cléo (yellow card) 45+1'; Muriqui 77'; Wu Pingfeng 87'		Gu Cao (yellow card) 24'; Katongo (yellow card) 39'; Son Seung-Joon (yellow card) 86'	Stadium: Tianhe Stadium; Attendance: 36,318; Referee: Yao Qing; Assistant referees: Mu Yuxin, Wu Lei; Fourth official: Wang Jin

30 March 2012 Round 4	Shanghai Shenhua	0–1	Guangzhou Evergrande	Shanghai
19:45 UTC+8	Qiu Tianyi (yellow card) 20'; Anelka (yellow card) 30'; Song Boxuan (yellow card) 59'; Song Boxuan (yellow card) 79' (yellow-red card); Zheng Kaimu (yellow card) 90+1'		Sun Xiang (yellow card) 25'; Feng Junyan 31'; Zheng Zhi (yellow card) 76'; Sun Xiang (yellow card) 90' (yellow-red card)	Stadium: Hongkou Football Stadium; Attendance: 21,356; Referee: Sun Baojie; Assistant referees: Han Wei, Zhang Hongwei; Fourth official: Li Haihe

8 April 2012 Round 5	Guangzhou Evergrande	1–1	Guizhou Renhe	Guangzhou
19:35 UTC+8	Conca 44' (pen.); Muriqui (yellow card) 53'; Feng Xiaoting (yellow card) 70'; Li Jianhua (yellow card) 87'		Muslimović 18'; Rodas (yellow card) 36'; Nano (yellow card) 43'; Djulbic (yellow card) 55'; Li Chunyu (yellow card) 80'; Zhang Chenglin (yellow card) 84'; Sun Jihai (yellow card) 88'	Stadium: Tianhe Stadium; Attendance: 31,295; Referee: Alan Milliner (Australia); Assistant referees: Huo Weiming, Liu Guiqing; Fourth official: Li Haihe

13 April 2012 Round 6	Guangzhou Evergrande	3–1	Hangzhou Greentown	Guangzhou
19:35 UTC+8	Li Yan (yellow card) 6'; Li Yan 33'; Muriqui 61'; Cléo 68' (pen.); Qin Sheng (yellow card) 70'; Muriqui (yellow card) 90'		Zheng Kewei (yellow card) 49'; Wang Song 90+3'	Stadium: Tianhe Stadium; Attendance: 36,128; Referee: Zhou Gang; Assistant referees: Xu Jun, Zhan Wei; Fourth official: Wang Di

22 April 2012 Round 7	Guangzhou Evergrande	4–0	Changchun Yatai	Guangzhou
19:35 UTC+8	Cléo 28'; Conca 49'; Zhao Xuri (yellow card) 56'; Conca 66'; Muriqui 80'		Ljubinković (yellow card) 53'	Stadium: Tianhe Stadium; Attendance: 38,214; Referee: Zhang Zhengping; Assistant referees: Zhang Jun, Wen Xiaofang; Fourth official: Li Haihe

27 April 2012 Round 8	Tianjin Teda	0–1	Guangzhou Evergrande	Tianjin
19:30 UTC+8	Goian (yellow card) 33'; Mao Biao (yellow card) 83'		Feng Junyan (yellow card) 47'; Sun Xiang (yellow card) 62'; Muriqui 85'	Stadium: TEDA Football Stadium; Attendance: 18,589; Referee: Ai Kun; Assistant referees: Han Wei, Liu Guiqing; Fourth official: Huang Yejun

6 May 2012 Round 9	Guangzhou Evergrande	2–1	Dalian Aerbin	Guangzhou
19:35 UTC+8	Muriqui 40'; Zheng Zhi (yellow card) 65'; Cléo 68' (pen.); Sun Xiang (yellow card) 83'		Addy (yellow card) 9'; Yin Lu 51'; Yu Ziqian (yellow card) 67'	Stadium: Tianhe Stadium; Attendance: 32,468; Referee: Li Haihe; Assistant referees: Mu Yuxin, Su Jige; Fourth official: Wang Jin

11 May 2012 Round 10	Dalian Shide	3–1	Guangzhou Evergrande	Dalian
19:00 UTC+8	Yan Xiangchuang 10'; Zhu Ting 57'; Kamburov 67'		Qin Sheng (yellow card) 21'; Qin Sheng 43'	Stadium: Jinzhou Stadium; Attendance: 7,682; Referee: Tan Hai; Assistant referees: Xu Jun, Zhang Hongwei; Fourth official: Shi Zhenlu

20 May 2012 Round 11	Guangzhou Evergrande	1–0	Qingdao Jonoon	Guangzhou
19:35 UTC+8	Gao Lin 68'; Feng Junyan (yellow card) 74'		Song Long (yellow card) 38'; Melkam (yellow card) 63'; Guo Liang (yellow card) 68'	Stadium: Tianhe Stadium; Attendance: 38,612; Referee: Li Jun; Assistant referees: Tong Yong, Lou Fangping; Fourth official: Shi Zhenlu

25 May 2012 Round 12	Shandong Luneng Taishan	1–1	Guangzhou Evergrande	Jinan
19:30 UTC+8	Liu Yang (yellow card) 30'; Zheng Zheng (yellow card) 32'; Wang Yongpo 84'		Zhang Linpeng 5'; Feng Xiaoting (yellow card) 65'; Zheng Zhi (yellow card) 88'; Wu Pingfeng (yellow card) 89'	Stadium: Shandong Provincial Stadium; Attendance: 33,453; Referee: Tan Hai; Assistant referees: Zhan Wei, Xu Jun; Fourth official: Huang Yejun

17 June 2012 Round 13	Guangzhou Evergrande	5–1	Jiangsu Sainty	Guangzhou
19:35 UTC+8	Conca 9'; Jiang Ning 54'; Muriqui 57'; Muriqui 62'; Zhang Linpeng (yellow card) 68'; Muriqui 90+3'		Liu Jianye (yellow card) 58'; Lu Bofei (yellow card) 65'; Qu Cheng 67'	Stadium: Tianhe Stadium; Attendance: 37,865; Referee: Huang Yejun; Assistant referees: Su Jige, Shao Honggeng; Fourth official: Guo Baolong

23 June 2012 Round 14	Liaoning Whowin	0–3	Guangzhou Evergrande	Shenyang
19:30 UTC+8	Zheng Tao (yellow card) 28'; Wu Gaojun (yellow card) 55'; Yu Hanchao (red card) 74'; Yang Shanping (yellow card) 80'		Feng Xiaoting (yellow card) 7'; Jiang Ning 42'; Gao Lin 62'; Conca 67'	Stadium: Tiexi New District Sports Center; Attendance: 27,823; Referee: Fan Qi; Assistant referees: Wu Lei, Zhang Hongwei; Fourth official: Zhao Zhizhi

1 July 2012 Round 15	Guangzhou Evergrande	3–2	Beijing Guoan	Guangzhou
19:35 UTC+8	Jiang Ning 16'; Zhang Linpeng (yellow card) 30'; Muriqui 35'; Qin Sheng (yellow card) 60'; Cléo 67'; Feng Xiaoting (yellow card) 74'		Zhang Xiaobin (yellow card) 7'; Xu Liang 12'; Xu Liang 45+2'; Wang Xiaolong (yellow card) 56'; Xu Yunlong (yellow card) 90+3'	Stadium: Tianhe Stadium; Attendance: 39,985; Referee: Wang Jin; Assistant referees: Han Wei, Wu Sining; Fourth official: Yao Qing

6 July 2012 Round 16	Shanghai Shenxin	1–1	Guangzhou Evergrande	Shanghai
19:45 UTC+8	Li Lei (yellow card) 7'; Zhao Zuojun (yellow card) 8'; Zhu Jiawei (yellow card) 65'; Johnny (yellow card) 86'; Anselmo 90+1' (pen.)		Muriqui (yellow card) 25'; Zheng Zhi (yellow card) 49'; Paulão (yellow card) 56'; Muriqui 62'; Zhao Xuri (yellow card) 84'	Stadium: Jinshan Sports Centre; Attendance: 11,002; Referee: Li Jun; Assistant referees: Tong Yong, Lou Fangping; Fourth official: Tang Kun

15 July 2012 Round 17	Guangzhou Evergrande	0–1	Guangzhou R&F	Guangzhou
19:35 UTC+8	Zheng Zhi (yellow card) 9'; Zhang Linpeng (yellow card) 32'		Wu Wei'an (yellow card) 26'; Tang Miao (yellow card) 34'; Yakubu 87'	Stadium: Tianhe Stadium; Attendance: 39,991; Referee: Tao Rancheng; Assistant referees: Han Wei, Zhan Wei; Fourth official: Wang Di

21 July 2012 Round 18	Henan Jianye	1–2	Guangzhou Evergrande	Zhengzhou
19:45 UTC+8	Tan Wangsong (yellow card) 7'; Xu Yang 28'		Zhao Xuri 9'; Barrios 64'; Cléo (yellow card) 76'; Zheng Zhi (yellow card) 86'	Stadium: Zhengzhou Hanghai Stadium; Attendance: 24,086; Referee: Shi Zhenlu; Assistant referees: Wen Xiaofang, Zhang Jun; Fourth official: Yao Qing

28 July 2012 Round 19	Guangzhou Evergrande	2–2	Shanghai Shenhua	Guangzhou
19:35 UTC+8	Conca 41'; Qin Sheng (yellow card) 42'; Muriqui 79'		Song Boxuan 57'; Song Boxuan (yellow card) 62'; Wu Xi (yellow card) 74'; Moreno 81'; Drogba (yellow card) 90+3'	Stadium: Tianhe Stadium; Attendance: 39,997; Referee: Xu Hang; Assistant referees: Wu Lei, Wu Sining; Fourth official: Tang Kun

4 August 2012 Round 20	Guizhou Renhe	2–1	Guangzhou Evergrande	Guiyang
19:30 UTC+8	Muslimović 34'; Chen Jie 80'		Tang Dechao (yellow card) 30'; Gao Lin 43'; Zheng Zhi (yellow card) 51'	Stadium: Guiyang Olympic Sports Center; Attendance: 52,888; Referee: Zhang Zhengping; Assistant referees: Song Xiangyun, Yang Li; Fourth official: Zhou Gang

11 August 2012 Round 21	Hangzhou Greentown	2–3	Guangzhou Evergrande	Hangzhou
19:35 UTC+8	Liu Bin (yellow card) 12'; Yang Zi (yellow card) 70'; Yang Zi 74'; Yang Zi 86'		Gao Lin 13'; Cléo 32'; Feng Xiaoting (yellow card) 55'; Huang Bowen 68'; Zheng Zhi (yellow card) 77'; Huang Bowen (yellow card) 87'	Stadium: Yellow Dragon Sports Center; Attendance: 17,785; Referee: Li Jun; Assistant referees: Huo Weiming, Su Jige; Fourth official: Zhou Gang

18 August 2012 Round 22	Changchun Yatai	1–2	Guangzhou Evergrande	Changchun
19:35 UTC+8	Ismailov (yellow card) 54'; Zhang Wenzhao 89'		Conca 49'; Muriqui (yellow card) 60'; Cléo 70'; Zheng Zhi (yellow card) 82'	Stadium: Development Area Stadium; Attendance: 21,365; Referee: Tan Hai; Assistant referees: Lou Fangping, Tong Yong; Fourth official: Li Haihe

25 August 2012 Round 23	Guangzhou Evergrande	0–0	Tianjin Teda	Guangzhou
19:35 UTC+8	Zheng Zhi (yellow card) 6'; Conca (penalty missed) 68'		Mao Biao (yellow card) 21'; He Yang (yellow card) 52'; Chen Tao (yellow card) 59'; Li Weifeng (yellow card) 67'	Stadium: Tianhe Stadium; Attendance: 38,700; Referee: Fan Qi; Assistant referees: Zhang Yongjun, Wu Sining; Fourth official: Tang Kun

13 September 2012 Round 24	Dalian Aerbin	0–0	Guangzhou Evergrande	Dalian
19:00 UTC+8	Hu Zhaojun (yellow card) 90'		Huang Jiaqiang (yellow card) 31'; Zhang Linpeng (yellow card) 81'	Stadium: Jinzhou Stadium; Attendance: 17,688; Referee: Guo Baolong; Assistant referees: Wu Lei, Shao Honggeng; Fourth official: Zhou Gang

23 September 2012 Round 25	Guangzhou Evergrande	3–1	Dalian Shide	Guangzhou
19:35 UTC+8	Li Jianhua 15'; Conca 32'; Sun Xiang (yellow card) 49'; Qin Sheng (yellow card) 54'; Zhang Linpeng 65'		Zhang Yaokun (yellow card) 26'; Quan Lei (yellow card) 34'; Zhang Yaokun 53'	Stadium: Tianhe Stadium; Attendance: 36,137; Referee: Xu Hang; Assistant referees: Zhan Wei, Zhang Yongjun; Fourth official: Tang Kun

28 September 2012 Round 26	Qingdao Jonoon	2–1	Guangzhou Evergrande	Qingdao
19:35 UTC+8	Léo San (yellow card) 30'; Bruno Meneghel 49'; Ibrahimov (yellow card) 76'; Zheng Long 85'		Zhao Xuri (yellow card) 18'; Conca (yellow card) 39'; Gao Lin 51'; Tang Dechao (yellow card) 56'; Gao Lin (yellow card) 57'; Tang Dechao (yellow card) 62' (yellow-red card); Zhang Linpeng (red card) 90+5'	Stadium: Qingdao Tiantai Stadium; Attendance: 11,762; Referee: Võ Minh Trí (Vietnam); Assistant referees: Han Wei, Shao Honggeng; Fourth official: Ai Kun

7 October 2012 Round 27	Guangzhou Evergrande	3–2	Shandong Luneng Taishan	Guangzhou
19:35 UTC+8	Cléo 25'; Zheng Zhi 55'; Qin Sheng (yellow card) 80'; Barrios 81'		Macena 35'; Han Peng 67'	Stadium: Tianhe Stadium; Attendance: 36,857; Referee: Wang Zhe; Assistant referees: Li Dongnan, Xu Jun; Fourth official: Fu Ming

20 October 2012 Round 28	Jiangsu Sainty	1–1	Guangzhou Evergrande	Nanjing
19:30 UTC+8	Ji Xiang 1'		Jiang Ning 49'	Stadium: Nanjing Olympic Sports Center; Attendance: 65,769; Referee: Fan Qi; Assistant referees: Mu Yuxin, Li Dongnan; Fourth official: Yao Qing

27 October 2012 Round 29	Guangzhou Evergrande	1–0	Liaoning Whowin	Guangzhou
15:30 UTC+8	Huang Bowen (yellow card) 39'; Gao Lin 90'; Gao Lin (yellow card) 91'		Zhao Junzhe (yellow card) 48'	Stadium: Tianhe Stadium; Attendance: 39,989; Referee: Tan Hai; Assistant referees: Su Jige, Li Dongnan; Fourth official: Tao Rancheng

3 November 2012 Round 30	Beijing Guoan	1–0	Guangzhou Evergrande	Beijing
15:30 UTC+8	Lang Zheng (yellow card) 39'; Zhang Xizhe 90+2'		Feng Xiaoting (yellow card) 34'; Cléo (yellow card) 78'	Stadium: Workers Stadium; Attendance: 38,832; Referee: Adam Kersey (Australia); Assistant referees: Han Wei, Zhang Hongwei; Fourth official: Tang Kun

=== Chinese FA Cup ===
18 July 2012 Fourth round	Guangzhou Evergrande	2–1	Henan Jianye	Guangzhou
19:45 UTC+8	Shi Hongjun (yellow card) 29'; Wu Pingfeng 80'; Li Jianhua 90'	Report	Wang Haozhi (yellow card) 6'; Han Chao (yellow card) 20'; Wang Jia'nan 44'; Yuan Ye (yellow card) 65'; Qiao Wei (yellow card) 71'; Wang Jia'nan (yellow card) 76'	Stadium: Tianhe Stadium; Attendance: 28,128; Referee: Li Haihe; Assistant referees: Li Dongnan, Wu Sining; Fourth official: Huang Yejun

1 August 2012 Quarter-finals	Guangzhou Evergrande	1–0	Dalian Aerbin	Guangzhou
19:00 UTC+8	Cléo 11'		Zhu Xiaogang (yellow card) 30'; Wang Hongyou (yellow card) 50'	Stadium: Tianhe Stadium; Attendance: 28,686; Referee: Wang Di; Assistant referees: Li Dongnan, Han Wei; Fourth official: Zhao Zhizhi

22 August 2012 Semi-finals; First leg	Guangzhou Evergrande	1–0	Liaoning Whowin	Guangzhou
19:35 UTC+8	Li Jianhua (yellow card) 22'; Gao Lin (yellow card) 43'; Zhao Xuri 69'; Gao Lin (penalty missed) 83'; Cho Won-Hee (yellow card) 87'		Yang Xu (yellow card) 17'; Zheng Tao (yellow card) 37'; Zheng Tao (yellow card) 82' (yellow-red card); Brandán (yellow card) 85'	Stadium: Tianhe Stadium; Attendance: 32,868; Referee: Chaiya Mahapab (Thailand); Assistant referees: Mu Yuxin, Han Wei; Fourth official: Zhao Zhizhi

26 September 2012 Semi-finals; Second leg	Liaoning Whowin	2–2 (2–3 agg.)	Guangzhou Evergrande	Shenyang
19:00 UTC+8	Trifunović 58'; Yang Shanping (yellow card) 65'; Wang Liang (yellow card) 69'; Yang Xu 82'; Yang Xu (yellow card) 90+5'		Zheng Zhi 4'; Feng Junyan (yellow card) 15'; Kim Young-Gwon (yellow card) 22'; Qin Sheng (yellow card) 65'; Jiang Ning (yellow card) 75'; Jiang Ning 78'; Zheng Zhi (yellow card) 89'	Stadium: Tiexi New District Sports Center; Attendance: 25,188; Referee: Choi Dae-Woo (Korea Republic); Assistant referees: Su Jige, Han Wei; Fourth official: Wang Di

10 November 2012 Final; First leg	Guizhou Moutai	1–1	Guangzhou Evergrande	Guiyang
19:30 UTC+8	Jordà 10'; Li Chunyu (yellow card) 37'; Sun Jihai (yellow card) 71'; Djulbic (yellow card) 84'; Muslimović (yellow card) 86'; Li Kai (yellow card) 90+4'		Barrios 49'; Gao Lin (yellow card) 80'; Gao Lin (yellow card) 81' (yellow-red card)	Stadium: Guiyang Olympic Sports Center; Attendance: 45,210; Referee: Alan Milliner (Australia); Assistant referees: Ashley Beecham (Australia), Nathan MacDonald (Australia); Fourth official: Yao Qing

18 November 2012 Final; Second leg	Guangzhou Evergrande	4–2 (5–3 agg.)	Guizhou Moutai	Guangzhou
15:30 UTC+8	Barrios 1'; Qin Sheng (yellow card) 32'; Zhao Xuri (yellow card) 38'; Zhang Linpeng 44'; Barrios 66'; Conca (yellow card) 76'; Conca 90+2'		Chen Jie (yellow card) 19'; Nano (yellow card) 33'; Guo Sheng (yellow card) 39'; Jordà 52'; Sun Jihai (yellow card) 64'; Djulbic (yellow card) 71'; Jordà (yellow card) 88'; Rao Weihui 90+4'	Stadium: Tianhe Stadium; Attendance: 39,989; Referee: Kim Sang-Woo (Korea Republic); Assistant referees: Kim Sung-Il (Korea Republic), Ji Seung-Min (Korea Republic); Fourth official: Wang Di

=== Chinese FA Super Cup ===
25 February 2012	Guangzhou Evergrande	2–1	Tianjin Teda	Guangzhou
14:00 UTC+8	Cléo 2'; Zhao Xuri (yellow card) 42'; Cléo 48'; Qin Sheng (yellow card) 79'; Feng Xiaoting (yellow card) 87'		Šumulikoski (yellow card) 31'; Wang Xinxin 83'	Stadium: University City Stadium; Attendance: 11,123; Referee: Tan Hai; Assistant referees: Su Jige, Huo Weiming; Fourth official: Zhou Gang

=== AFC Champions League ===
==== Group stage ====
Group H
Team	Pld	W	D	L	GF	GA	GD	Pts
(China) Guangzhou Evergrande	6	3	1	2	12	8	+4	10
(Japan) Kashiwa Reysol	6	3	1	2	11	7	+4	10
(South Korea) Jeonbuk Hyundai Motors	6	3	0	3	10	15	−5	9
(Thailand) Buriram United	6	2	0	4	8	11	−3	6

7 March 2012 Group H	Jeonbuk Hyundai Motors (South Korea)	1–5	(China) Guangzhou Evergrande	Jeonju, South Korea
19:00 UTC+9	Jin Kyung-Sun (yellow card) 30'; Jeong Shung-Hoon 70'	Report; Summary	Zhang Linpeng (yellow card) 25'; Cléo 27'; Conca 41'; Cléo 69'; Conca 73'; Cho Won-Hee (yellow card) 74'; Muriqui 76'	Stadium: Jeonju World Cup Stadium; Attendance: 7,978; Referee: Saeid Mozaffari (Iran); Assistant referees: Reza Sokhandan (Iran), Alireza Gholamhossein Kahouri (Iran); Fourth official: Akbar Bakhshi Zadeh (Iran)

21 March 2012 Group H	Guangzhou Evergrande (China)	1–2	(Thailand) Buriram United	Guangzhou, China PR
20:00 UTC+8	Zhang Linpeng (yellow card) 21'; Yang Jun (yellow card) 61'; Cléo 69'	Report; Summary	Theeratorn (yellow card) 11'; Jadigerov (yellow card) 42'; Surat (yellow card) 57'; Suchao 62' (pen.); Acheampong 79'	Stadium: Tianhe Stadium; Attendance: 38,512; Referee: Andre El Haddad (Lebanon); Assistant referees: Birak Ziad (Lebanon), Hadi El Kassar (Lebanon); Fourth official: Ghandour Radwan (Lebanon)

4 April 2012 Group H	Kashiwa Reysol (Japan)	0–0	(China) Guangzhou Evergrande	Kashiwa, Japan
19:00 UTC+9	Fukui (yellow card) 14'; Kurisawa (yellow card) 64'	Report; Summary		Stadium: Hitachi Kashiwa Soccer Stadium; Attendance: 8,787; Referee: Ali Al Badwawi (UAE); Assistant referees: Saleh Al Marzouqi (UAE), Mhd Jawdat Nehlawi (Syria); Fourth official: Hamad Al Shaikh Hashmi (UAE)

17 April 2012 Group H	Guangzhou Evergrande (China)	3–1	(Japan) Kashiwa Reysol	Guangzhou, China PR
19:30 UTC+8	Qin Sheng (yellow card) 7'; Conca 29' (pen.); Zhao Xuri (yellow card) 55'; Muriqui 58'; Muriqui 84'	Report; Summary	Watanabe (yellow card) 27'; Sakai 50'; Sakai (yellow card) 74'	Stadium: Tianhe Stadium; Attendance: 40,000; Referee: Abdulrahman Hussain (Qatar); Assistant referees: Hassan Althawadi (Qatar), Taleb Al-Marri (Qatar); Fourth official: Khamis Al-Kuwari (Qatar)

1 May 2012 Group H	Guangzhou Evergrande (China)	1–3	(South Korea) Jeonbuk Hyundai Motors	Guangzhou, China PR
19:30 UTC+8	Conca 10' (pen.); Yang Jun (yellow card) 92+2'	Report; Summary	Cho Sung-Hwan (yellow card) 42'; Lee Seung-Hyun 44'; Cho Sung-Hwan (yellow card) 65' (yellow-red card); Lee Dong-Gook 90+1'; Lee Dong-Gook 90+3' (pen.)	Stadium: Tianhe Stadium; Attendance: 47,869; Referee: Valentin Kovalenko (Uzbekistan); Assistant referees: Rafael Lyasov (Uzbekistan), Mamur Saidkasimov (Uzbekistan); Fourth official: Tin Htut (Myanmar)

15 May 2012 Group H	Buriram United (Thailand)	1–2	(China) Guangzhou Evergrande	Buriram, Thailand
18:30 UTC+7	Suchao (yellow card) 43'; Domtaisong 57'; Surat (yellow card) 89'	Report; Summary	Jiang Ning (yellow card) 28'; Zhang Linpeng (yellow card) 38'; Gao Lin 49'; Zheng Zhi (yellow card) 75'; Qin Sheng (yellow card) 76'; Conca 90' (pen.)	Stadium: New I-Mobile Stadium; Attendance: 18,000; Referee: Strebre Delovski (Australia); Assistant referees: Matthew Cream (Australia), Hakan Anaz (Australia); Fourth official: Saleem Ali (Maldives)

==== Knockout stage ====
===== Round of 16 =====
30 May 2012 Round of 16	Guangzhou Evergrande (China)	1–0	(Japan) FC Tokyo	Guangzhou, China PR
20:00 UTC+8	Cléo 31'; Zhang Linpeng (yellow card) 68'; Zhao Xuri (yellow card) 82'	Report; Summary	Morishige (yellow card) 61'	Stadium: Tianhe Stadium; Attendance: 39,560; Referee: Abdullah Balideh (Qatar); Assistant referees: Taleb Salem Al-Marri (Qatar), Ramzan Saeed Al-Naemi (Qatar); Fourth official: Mohd Nafeez Bin Abdul Wahab (Malaysia)

===== Quarter-finals =====
19 September 2012 1st leg	Al-Ittihad (Saudi Arabia)	4–2	(China) Guangzhou Evergrande	Jeddah, Saudi Arabia
20:35 UTC+3	Diego Souza 28'; Noor 49' (pen.); Hazazi 61'; Tukar (yellow card) 72'; Hazzazi (yellow card) 83'; Hazazi 88'; M'Bami (yellow card) 90+2'	Report; Summary	Gao Lin 27'; Huang Bowen 39'; Huang Bowen (yellow card) 67'; Sun Xiang (yellow card) 83'	Stadium: Prince Abdullah al-Faisal Stadium; Attendance: 15,971; Referee: Andre El Haddad (Lebanon); Assistant referees: Birak Ziad (Lebanon), Yaser Marad (Kuwait); Fourth official: Ali Shaban (Kuwait)

2 October 2012 2nd leg	Guangzhou Evergrande (China)	2–1 (4–5 agg.)	(Saudi Arabia) Al-Ittihad	Guangzhou, China PR
20:00 UTC+8	Barrios 19'; Conca 35' (pen.); Feng Xiaoting (yellow card) 45'; Conca (yellow card) 72'	Report; Summary	Tukar (yellow card) 26'; O. Al-Muwallad (yellow card) 34'; Al-Montashari (yellow card) 38'; F. Al-Muwallad 79'	Stadium: Tianhe Stadium; Attendance: 39,997; Referee: Kim Dong-Jin (Korea Republic); Assistant referees: Jeong Hae-Sang (Korea Republic), Yang Byoung-Eun (Korea Republic); Fourth official: Ko Hyung-Jin (Korea Republic)

== Squad statistics ==
No.	Pos.	Player name	Super League					FA Cup					Champions League					Super Cup					TOTALS				
No.	Pos.	Player name	Apps.	Starts	Goals	(yellow card) YC	(red card) RC	Apps.	Starts	Goals	(yellow card) YC	(red card) RC	Apps.	Starts	Goals	(yellow card) YC	(red card) RC	Apps.	Starts	Goals	(yellow card) YC	(red card) RC	Apps.	Starts	Goals	(yellow card) YC	(red card) RC
1	GK	(China) Yang Jun	20	20	0	0	0	0	0	0	0	0	7	7	0	2	0	1	1	0	0	0	28	28	0	2	0
2	DF	(China) Tu Dongxu	0	0	0	0	0	1	1	0	0	0	0	0	0	0	0	0	0	0	0	0	1	1	0	0	0
3	DF	(Brazil) Paulão	19	13	0	2	0	2	2	0	0	0	0	0	0	0	0	0	0	0	0	0	21	15	0	2	0
4	DF	(China) Rong Hao	3	2	0	0	0	3	2	0	0	0	2	1	0	0	0	0	0	0	0	0	8	5	0	0	0
5	DF	(China) Zhang Linpeng	21	21	2	6	1	3	3	1	0	0	7	7	0	4	0	1	1	0	0	0	32	32	3	10	1
6	DF	(China) Feng Xiaoting	19	18	0	6	0	3	3	0	0	0	9	9	0	1	0	1	1	0	1	0	32	31	0	8	0
7	MF	(China) Feng Junyan	14	5	1	2	0	6	4	0	1	0	7	1	0	0	0	0	0	0	0	0	27	10	1	3	0
8	MF	(China) Qin Sheng	21	16	1	6	0	4	4	0	2	0	5	4	0	2	0	1	0	0	1	0	31	24	1	11	0
9	FW	(Brazil) Cléo	28	22	7	3	0	4	3	1	0	0	7	7	4	0	0	1	1	2	0	0	40	33	14	3	0
10	MF	(China) Zheng Zhi	24	20	1	12	0	3	3	1	1	0	9	9	0	1	0	0	0	0	0	0	36	32	2	14	0
11	FW	(Brazil) Muriqui	20	18	12	5	0	2	1	0	0	0	8	7	3	0	0	1	1	0	0	0	31	27	15	5	0
12	GK	(China) Dong Chunyu	0	0	0	0	0	1	0	0	0	0	0	0	0	0	0	0	0	0	0	0	1	0	0	0	0
13	DF	(China) Tang Dechao	7	5	0	1	1	2	2	0	0	0	0	0	0	0	0	0	0	0	0	0	9	7	0	1	1
14	DF	(China) Li Jianhua	17	13	1	1	0	4	3	1	1	0	4	1	0	0	0	1	1	0	0	0	26	18	2	2	0
15	MF	(Argentina) Darío Conca	24	21	10	1	0	2	2	1	1	0	9	9	6	1	0	1	1	0	0	0	36	33	17	3	0
16	MF	(South Korea) Cho Won-Hee	17	15	0	1	0	2	2	0	1	0	7	7	0	1	0	1	1	0	0	0	27	25	0	3	0
17	MF	(China) Gao Zhilin	3	1	0	0	0	1	0	0	0	0	0	0	0	0	0	0	0	0	0	0	4	1	0	0	0
18	FW	(Paraguay) Lucas Barrios	8	3	2	0	0	6	5	3	0	0	2	2	1	0	0	0	0	0	0	0	16	10	6	0	0
19	DF	(China) Li Jianbin	1	1	0	0	0	0	0	0	0	0	0	0	0	0	0	0	0	0	0	0	1	1	0	0	0
21	FW	(China) Jiang Ning	15	10	4	0	0	2	0	1	1	0	4	2	0	1	0	1	0	0	0	0	22	12	5	2	0
22	GK	(China) Li Shuai	10	10	0	0	0	6	6	0	0	0	2	2	0	0	0	0	0	0	0	0	18	18	0	0	0
23	MF	(China) Li Zhilang	1	0	0	0	0	0	0	0	0	0	0	0	0	0	0	0	0	0	0	0	1	0	0	0	0
24	MF	(China) Shi Hongjun	2	1	0	0	0	2	1	0	1	0	0	0	0	0	0	0	0	0	0	0	4	2	0	1	0
25	MF	(China) Peng Xinli	1	1	0	0	0	2	2	0	0	0	0	0	0	0	0	0	0	0	0	0	3	3	0	0	0
26	MF	(China) Wu Pingfeng	19	10	1	1	0	3	3	1	0	0	2	0	0	0	0	1	0	0	0	0	25	13	2	1	0
27	FW	(China) Ye Weichao	2	0	0	0	0	0	0	0	0	0	0	0	0	0	0	0	0	0	0	0	2	0	0	0	0
28	DF	(South Korea) Kim Young-Gwon	7	7	0	0	0	4	4	0	1	0	2	2	0	0	0	0	0	0	0	0	13	13	0	1	0
29	FW	(China) Gao Lin	24	20	6	2	0	3	2	0	1	1	9	8	2	0	0	1	1	0	0	0	37	31	8	3	1
31	DF	(China) Zhang Hongnan	1	1	0	0	0	1	1	0	0	0	0	0	0	0	0	0	0	0	0	0	2	2	0	0	0
32	DF	(China) Sun Xiang	25	24	0	3	1	2	2	0	0	0	8	8	0	1	0	1	1	0	0	0	36	35	0	4	1
33	MF	(China) Li Yan	3	3	1	1	0	0	0	0	0	0	0	0	0	0	0	0	0	0	0	0	3	3	1	1	0
34	MF	(China) Huang Jiaqiang	4	3	0	1	0	2	0	0	0	0	0	0	0	0	0	0	0	0	0	0	6	3	0	1	0
35	FW	(China) Mehmet Ali	6	2	0	0	0	0	0	0	0	0	0	0	0	0	0	0	0	0	0	0	6	2	0	0	0
37	MF	(China) Zhao Xuri	20	16	1	4	0	5	4	1	1	0	8	6	0	2	0	1	1	0	1	0	34	27	2	8	0
39	MF	(China) Tan Jiajun	2	0	0	0	0	0	0	0	0	0	0	0	0	0	0	0	0	0	0	0	2	0	0	0	0
42	MF	(China) Huang Bowen	9	8	1	2	0	3	1	0	0	0	1	0	1	1	0	0	0	0	0	0	13	9	2	3	0
OWN GOAL																											
TOTALS					51	60	3			11	12	1			17	17	0			2	3	0			81	92	4
TOTALS						Yellow card	Red card				Yellow card	Red card				Yellow card	Red card				Yellow card	Red card				Yellow card	Red card
