= 2011 Guangzhou Evergrande F.C. season =

Guangzhou Evergrande 2011
- Chairman: (China) Liu Yongzhuo
- Manager: (South Korea) Lee Jang-Soo (South Korea) Kim Seong-Gu (in name)
- Stadium: Tianhe Stadium
- Super League: 1st
- FA Cup: Second Round
- Top goalscorer: League: (Brazil) Muriqui (16); All: (Brazil) Muriqui (20)
- Highest home attendance: 50,389 (v Chengdu Blades, 6 July)
- Lowest home attendance: 35,856 (v Hangzhou Greentown, 29 October)
- Average home league attendance: 45,666
Home colours	Away colours

The 2011 Guangzhou Evergrande season is the 58th year in Guangzhou Evergrande's existence and its 44th season in the Chinese football league, also its 22nd season in the top flight. The club was promoted from China League One at the end of the 2010 season.

== Review ==
- 25 December 2010, Guangzhou confirmed that they had signed Zhang Linpeng, Jiang Ning, Feng Xiaoting and Yang Jun for a total fee of €3.4 million.
- 25 January 2011, China national team midfielder Yang Hao signed for Guangzhou from Beijing Guoan on a free transfer.
- 6 February 2011, Guangzhou got the second place in the 2011 Asian Challenge Cup after losing 5–3 in the penalty shootout with Tianjin Teda.
- 9 February 2011, Brazilian striker Cléo completed a €3.2 million move to Guangzhou from FK Partizan, signing a four-year deal.
- 13 February 2011, Korean midfielder Cho Won-Hee joined Guangzhou Evergrande from Premier League side Wigan Athletic on a free transfer, which made him the second Korean player to play for Guangzhou F.C. after Park Ji-Ho.
- 2 March 2011, Guangzhou confirmed that they had signed Paulão on a four-year deal from Grêmio Prudente with a fee of €2.5 million.
- 8 March 2011, Guangzhou confirmed that they had signed Renato Cajá on a four-year deal from Botafogo with a fee of €1.6 million.
- 2 April 2011, Guangzhou's Super League 2011 campaign kicked off with a 1–0 home victory over Dalian Shide. Cléo scored the only goal of the match.
- 9 April 2011, Guangzhou broke club's record for longest unbeaten streak in the league (23 games, 17 wins and 6 draws) with a 1–1 away draw against Nanchang Hengyuan.
- 4 May 2011, Guangzhou's FA Cup 2011 campaign kicked off with a 3–2 home victory with second-tier club Guizhou Zhicheng. Muriqui scored a hat trick in the match.
- 8 May 2011, Guangzhou claimed first place in China Super League for the first time of the club's history after a 1–0 away win against Shenzhen Ruby.
- 12 May 2011, Guangzhou was kicked out in the FA Cup after losing at a 13 round super long Penalty shootout against Shaanxi Renhe.
- 3 July 2011, Guangzhou confirmed that they had signed Darío Conca from Fluminense on a three-and-a-half-year deal for a reported record breaking fee of €10 million.
- 18 September 2011, Guangzhou lost to Changchun Yatai 1–2 at Development Area Stadium, which ended club's record 44-league-match unbeaten run.
- 28 September 2011, Guangzhou successfully achieved their first Super League title away to Shaanxi Renhe, after a 4–1 win.

== Squad ==
Note: Flags indicate national team as defined under FIFA eligibility rules; some limited exceptions apply. Players may hold more than one non-FIFA nationality.

No.	Pos.	Nation	Player
1	GK	CHN	Yang Jun
2	DF	CHN	Tu Dongxu
3	DF	BRA	Paulão
4	FW	CHN	Gao Shunhang
5	DF	CHN	Zhang Linpeng
6	DF	CHN	Feng Xiaoting
7	MF	CHN	Feng Junyan
8	MF	BRA	Renato Cajá (to July)
9	FW	BRA	Cléo
10	MF	CHN	Zheng Zhi (captain)
11	FW	BRA	Muriqui
12	GK	CHN	Dong Chunyu
13	DF	CHN	Tang Dechao
14	DF	CHN	Li Jianhua (vice-captain)
15	MF	ARG	Darío Conca (from July)
16	MF	KOR	Cho Won-Hee
17	MF	CHN	Gao Zhilin
18	DF	CHN	Chen Jianlong
19	MF	CHN	Yang Hao

No.	Pos.	Nation	Player
20	FW	CHN	Ni Bo
21	FW	CHN	Jiang Ning
22	GK	CHN	Li Shuai
23	MF	CHN	Li Zhilang
24	MF	CHN	Shi Hongjun
25	MF	CHN	Yang Yihu
26	MF	CHN	Wu Pingfeng
27	FW	CHN	Ye Weichao
28	GK	CHN	Zhi Xinhua
29	FW	CHN	Gao Lin
30	MF	CHN	Peng Shaoxiong
31	DF	CHN	Zhang Hongnan
32	DF	CHN	Sun Xiang
33	MF	CHN	Li Yan
34	DF	CHN	Huang Jiaqiang
35	DF	CHN	Guo Zichao
38	DF	CHN	Zhang Yujia
39	DF	CHN	Zhang Tianlong
40	DF	CHN	Pan Weiye

== Technical staff ==
Position	Staff
Head coach	(South Korea) Lee Jang-Soo (South Korea) Kim Seong-Gu (in name)
Assistant coach	(China) Qiu Ming
Assistant coach / Fitness coach	(South Korea) Kim Yong-Kab
Assistant coach	(China) Jiang Feng
Goalkeeping coach	(China) Wang Weiman
Team doctor	(China) Kang Kebao
Physician	(Brazil) Renato Hiroshi
Technical analyst	(South Korea) Kim Hyo-Jung
Reserve team coach	(China) Qu Shengqing
Youth team coach	(China) Peng Weiguo

== Transfers ==
=== Winter ===
In:

No.	Pos.	Nation	Player
1	GK	CHN	Yang Jun (from Tianjin Teda)
3	DF	BRA	Paulão (from (Brazil) Grêmio Prudente)
5	DF	CHN	Zhang Linpeng (from Shanghai East Asia)
6	DF	CHN	Feng Xiaoting (from (South Korea) Jeonbuk Hyundai Motors)
8	MF	BRA	Renato Cajá (from (Brazil) Botafogo)
9	FW	BRA	Cléo (from (Serbia) FK Partizan)
15	MF	CHN	Hu Zhaojun (from Dalian Shide)
16	MF	KOR	Cho Won-Hee (from (England) Wigan Athletic)
19	MF	CHN	Yang Hao (from Beijing Guoan)
21	FW	CHN	Jiang Ning (from Qingdao Jonoon)
27	FW	CHN	Ye Weichao (loan return from Guangdong Sunray Cave)
35	DF	CHN	Zhang Tianlong (from Shandong Luneng)

Out:

No.	Pos.	Nation	Player
2	DF	CHN	Li Zhihai (to Guangdong Sunray Cave)
5	DF	CHN	Dai Xianrong (retired)
6	MF	CHN	Hu Zhaojun (loan return to Dalian Shide)
8	MF	BRA	Eduardo Delani (released)
9	FW	CAN	Charles Gbeke (released)
10	MF	NGR	Gabriel Melkam (to Qingdao Jonoon)
15	DF	CHN	Xu Weilong (released)
16	MF	CHN	Xu Deen (to Hunan Billows)
17	MF	CHN	Cai Yaohui (retired)
30	MF	CHN	Lu Lin (to Guangdong Sunray Cave)
33	DF	CHN	Huang Zhiyi (to (Macau) Hoi Fan)
34	DF	CHN	Wang Xiaoshi (to Hubei Greenery)
-	MF	CHN	Hu Zhaojun (to Dalian Aerbin)
-	MF	CHN	Shi Tingliang (loan to (Macau) G.D. Artilheiros)
-	FW	CHN	Li Jiaqi (loan to (Macau) G.D. Artilheiros)
-	MF	CHN	Li Bin (loan to (Macau) G.D. Artilheiros)
-	FW	CHN	Zhu Pengfei (loan to (Macau) Lam Ieng)

=== Summer ===
In:

No.	Pos.	Nation	Player
15	MF	ARG	Darío Conca (from (Brazil) Fluminense)

Out:

No.	Pos.	Nation	Player
8	MF	BRA	Renato Cajá (loan to (Brazil) Ponte Preta)

== Starting XI ==
#	Pos	Player	Starts
1	GK	(China) Yang Jun	19
14	RB	(China) Li Jianhua	24
3	CB	(Brazil) Paulão	27
6	CB	(China) Feng Xiaoting	27
32	LB	(China) Sun Xiang	25
16	DM	(South Korea) Cho Won-Hee	30
10	DM	(China) Zheng Zhi(C)	25
26	RW	(China) Wu Pingfeng	23
15	AM	(Argentina) Conca	14
29	LW	(China) Gao Lin	28
11	ST	(Brazil) Muriqui	26

Source: Squad stats.
Using the most used start formation 4–2–3–1.
Ordered by position on pitch (from back right to front left).

== Pre-season and friendlies ==
=== Training matches ===
Pre-season
Date	Opponents	H / A	Result	Scorers
2011-01-06	(China) Henan Construction	H	3–3	
2011-01-08	(China) Henan Construction	H	3–1	Tu Dongxu, Shi Hongjun, Yang Yihu
2011-01-14	(South Korea) Myongji University	H	2–0	Yang Yihu (2)
2011-01-15	(China) Henan Construction	H	0–1	
2011-01-20	(China) Hunan Billows	H	2–2	Gao Zhilin，Guo Zichao
2011-01-22	(South Korea) Daejeon Citizen	H	3–0	Yang Yihu(2), Ye Weichao
2011-01-26	(China) Dalian Aerbin	H	1–0	
2011-01-29	(China) Dalian Aerbin	H	2–1	Gao Lin, Muriqui
2011-02-18	(China) Qingdao Jonoon	H	2–1	Wu Pingfeng(2)
2011-02-25	(South Korea) University Team	A	0–1	
2011-02-26	(South Korea) Myongji University	A	6–2	Muriqui(3), Yang Hao, Sun Xiang, Ye Weichao
2011-03-01	(South Korea) Gyeongnam FC	A	0–1	
2011-03-02	(South Korea) Myongji University	A	1–4	
2011-03-04	(South Korea) Soongsil University	A	2–2	Muriqui, Feng Junyan
2011-03-07	(South Korea) Gyeongnam FC	A	2–2	Muriqui, Yang Hao
2011-03-08	(South Korea) Hanlyo University	A	6–0	
2011-03-10	(South Korea) Daegu University	A	3–1	Muriqui, Cléo (2)
2011-03-22	(China) Chongqing F.C.	H	4–0	Cléo (3), Feng Xiaoting
2011-03-23	(China) Fushun Xinye	H	0–1	
2011-03-26	(China) Shenzhen Ruby	N	2–0	Cléo (2)

Summer break
Date	Opponents	H / A	Result	Scorers
2011-07-24	(China) Chongqing Lifan	A	2–0	Jiang Ning, Shi Hongjun
2011-07-26	(China) Chongqing Lifan	A	1–2	Muriqui
2011-09-03	(China) Guangzhou R&F	H	4–0	Cléo, Gao Zhilin, Muriqui, Li Zhilang
2011-10-09	(China) Guangzhou R&F	H	1–3	Muriqui

=== 2011 Asian Challenge Cup ===
3 February 2011 Semi-final	South China (Hong Kong)	0–1	(China) Guangzhou Evergrande	So Kon Po, Hong Kong
17:30 UTC+8		Report	Muriqui 68'	Stadium: Hong Kong Stadium; Attendance: 11,088; Referee: Hiroyoshi Takayama (Japan)

6 February 2011 Final	Guangzhou Evergrande (China)	0–0 (3–5 p)	(China) Tianjin Teda	So Kon Po, Hong Kong
17:30 UTC+8		Report		Stadium: Hong Kong Stadium; Attendance: 11,348; Referee: Hiroyoshi Takayama (Japan)
	Penalties
	Muriqui (penalty scored); Gao Lin (penalty scored); Zhang Linpeng (penalty missed); Li Yan (penalty scored)		Cao Yang (penalty scored); Wang Xinxin (penalty scored); Wu Weian (penalty scored); Zorić (penalty scored); Li Benjian (penalty scored)

=== Real Madrid China tour ===
3 August 2011	Guangzhou Evergrande (China)	1–7	(Spain) Real Madrid	Guangzhou
19:45 UTC+8	Yang Yihu 88'		Khedira 7'; Özil 31'; Benzema 39', 50'; Ronaldo 57'; Jesé 72'; Di María 84'	Stadium: Tianhe Stadium; Attendance: 45,000; Referee: Liu Kwok Man (Hong Kong)

=== 2011 CSL All-Stars Game ===
27 November 2011	Guangzhou Evergrande	1–1 (4–2 p)	CSL All-Stars	Guangzhou
15:30 UTC+8	Wu Pingfeng 20'		Song Wenjie 68'	Stadium: Tianhe Stadium; Referee: Zhao Liang
	Penalties
	Conca (penalty scored); Feng Xiaoting (penalty missed); Jiang Ning (penalty scored); Sun Xiang (penalty scored); Zhang Linpeng (penalty scored)		Zhao Junzhe (penalty scored); Zhang Chenglin (penalty missed); Wang Song (penalty missed); Huang Fengtao (penalty scored)

== Competitions ==
=== Chinese Super League ===
==== League table ====
Pos	Team	Pld	W	D	L	GF	GA	GD	Pts	Qualification or relegation
1	Guangzhou Evergrande (C)	30	20	8	2	67	23	+44	68	AFC Champions League group stage
2	Beijing Guoan	30	14	11	5	49	21	+28	53	AFC Champions League group stage
3	Liaoning Whowin	30	14	8	8	38	23	+15	50	AFC Champions League qualifying play-off (Note: Liaoning Whowin qualified for the 2012 AFC Champions League but withdrew from the tournament.)
4	Jiangsu Sainty	30	14	5	11	43	28	+15	47 (Note: Jiangsu, 3 pts, 2–1; Shandong, 3 pts, 1–2)	
5	Shandong Luneng	30	13	8	9	37	31	+6	47	

Updated to match(es) played on 2 November 2011. Source: http://csl.sina.com.cn/statistics/
Rules for classification: 1st points; 2nd head-to-head points; 3rd head-to-head goal difference; 4th head-to-head goals scored; 5th goal difference; 6th goals scored; 7th disciplinary points (1 point for each yellow card, 3 points for each red card). Head-to-Head: used when head-to-head record is used to rank tied teams.
(C) Champions

==== Results summary ====
Overall								Home						Away					
Pld	W	D	L	GF	GA	GD	Pts	W	D	L	GF	GA	GD	W	D	L	GF	GA	GD
30	20	8	2	67	23	+44	68	13	2	0	42	7	+35	7	6	2	25	16	+9

==== Results by round ====
Round	1	2	3	4	5	6	7	8	9	10	11	12	13	14	15	16	17	18	19	20	21	22	23	24	25	26	27	28	29	30
Ground	H	A	H	A	H	A	H	A	H	A	H	H	A	H	A	H	A	H	A	H	A	H	A	A	H	A	H	A	H	A
Result	W	D	D	W	W	W	W	D	D	W	W	W	W	W	W	W	D	W	D	W	D	W	W	L	W	W	W	L	W	D
Position	4	5	5	5	2	1	1	1	2	1	1	1	1	1	1	1	1	1	1	1	1	1	1	1	1	1	1	1	1	1

W = Win; D = Draw; L = Loss

==== Matches ====
2 April 2011 Round 1	Guangzhou Evergrande	1–0	Dalian Shide	Guangzhou
20:00 UTC+8	Cléo 47'			Stadium: Tianhe Stadium; Attendance: 50,000; Referee: Sun Baojie

9 April 2011 Round 2	Nanchang Hengyuan	1–1	Guangzhou Evergrande	Nanchang
15:40 UTC+8	Teng Bin 55' (pen.)		Cléo 14'	Stadium: Nanchang Bayi Stadium; Attendance: 14,562; Referee: Xu Fuxin

17 April 2011 Round 3	Guangzhou Evergrande	2–2	Beijing Guoan	Guangzhou
19:30 UTC+8	Muriqui 31', 88'		Xu Liang 23'; Wang Xiaolong 48'	Stadium: Tianhe Stadium; Attendance: 38,612; Referee: Guo Baolong

23 April 2011 Round 4	Qingdao Jonoon	0–2	Guangzhou Evergrande	Qingdao
15:30 UTC+8			Cléo 19' (pen.); Gao Lin 60'	Stadium: Qingdao Tiantai Stadium; Attendance: 13,741; Referee: Xu Hang

29 April 2011 Round 5	Guangzhou Evergrande	2–1	Liaoning Whowin	Guangzhou
19:30 UTC+8	Cléo 31', 61' (pen.)		Kim Yoo-Jin 42'	Stadium: Tianhe Stadium; Attendance: 39,263; Referee: Huang Yejun

8 May 2011 Round 6	Shenzhen Ruby	0–1	Guangzhou Evergrande	Huizhou
15:30 UTC+8			Jiang Ning 68'	Stadium: Huizhou Olympic Stadium; Attendance: 17,648; Referee: Zhou Gang

15 May 2011 Round 7	Guangzhou Evergrande	3–1	Henan Construction	Guangzhou
20:00 UTC+8	Zheng Zhi 74'; Ye Weichao 78'; Feng Xiaoting 90+1'		Netto 70'	Stadium: Tianhe Stadium; Attendance: 43,796; Referee: Zhang Lei

20 May 2011 Round 8	Shandong Luneng	0–0	Guangzhou Evergrande	Jinan
19:30 UTC+8				Stadium: Shandong Stadium; Attendance: 11,869; Referee: Huang Yejun

29 May 2011 Round 9	Guangzhou Evergrande	1–1	Changchun Yatai	Guangzhou
20:00 UTC+8	Muriqui 89'		Dori 31'	Stadium: Tianhe Stadium; Attendance: 48,920; Referee: Ma Li

12 June 2011 Round 10	Tianjin Teda	0–1	Guangzhou Evergrande	Tianjin
19:30 UTC+8			Feng Xiaoting 32'	Stadium: TEDA Stadium; Attendance: 31,338; Referee: Yao Qing

18 June 2011 Round 11	Guangzhou Evergrande	2–0	Shaanxi Chanba	Guangzhou
20:00 UTC+8	Muriqui 76'; Wu Pingfeng 90+2'			Stadium: Tianhe Stadium; Attendance: 48,312; Referee: Wang Di

26 June 2011 Round 12	Guangzhou Evergrande	2–1	Jiangsu Sainty	Guangzhou
20:00 UTC+8	Gao Lin 33' (pen.); Cléo 57' (pen.)		Djite 72' (pen.)	Stadium: Tianhe Stadium; Attendance: 43,218; Referee: Xu Fuxin

2 July 2011 Round 13	Hangzhou Greentown	1–3	Guangzhou Evergrande	Yiwu, Jinhua
19:30 UTC+8	Bari 90+1'		Cléo 39'; Gao Lin 51'; Muriqui 83'	Stadium: Meihu Sports Center; Attendance: 10,542; Referee: Fan Qi

6 July 2011 Round 14	Guangzhou Evergrande	4–0	Chengdu Blades	Guangzhou
20:00 UTC+8	Muriqui 22'; Cléo 41'; Jiang Ning 74'; Zheng Zhi 80'			Stadium: Tianhe Stadium; Attendance: 50,389; Referee: Wang Jin

10 July 2011 Round 15	Dalian Shide	1–3	Guangzhou Evergrande	Dalian
19:00 UTC+8	Chamanga 84'		Cléo 79'; Muriqui 85', 88'	Stadium: Jinzhou Stadium; Attendance: 21,170; Referee: Sun Baojie

14 July 2011 Round 16	Guangzhou Evergrande	5–0	Nanchang Hengyuan	Guangzhou
20:00 UTC+8	Wu Pingfeng 27'; Cléo 48'; Muriqui 50'; Conca 85'; Jiang Ning 90'			Stadium: Tianhe Stadium; Attendance: 48,500; Referee: Tao Rancheng

1 August 2011 Round 17	Beijing Guoan	1–1	Guangzhou Evergrande	Beijing
19:30 UTC+8	W. Martínez 75'		Gao Lin 67'	Stadium: Workers Stadium; Attendance: 53,375; Referee: Kenji Ogiya (Japan)

6 August 2011 Round 18	Guangzhou Evergrande	4–0	Qingdao Jonoon	Guangzhou
20:00 UTC+8	Conca 16', 28'; Gao Lin 60'; Gao Zhilin 85'			Stadium: Tianhe Stadium; Attendance: 48,160; Referee: Wang Zhe

12 August 2011 Round 19	Liaoning Whowin	1–1	Guangzhou Evergrande	Shenyang
19:30 UTC+8	Kim Yoo-Jin 28'		Gao Lin 83'	Stadium: Tiexi Stadium; Attendance: 25,812; Referee: Ma Ning

17 August 2011 Round 20	Guangzhou Evergrande	4–1	Shenzhen Ruby	Guangzhou
20:00 UTC+8	Zheng Zhi 44', 90'; Gao Lin 78'; Conca 80' (pen.)		Flores 14'	Stadium: Tianhe Stadium; Attendance: 48,020; Referee: Guo Baolong

21 August 2011 Round 21	Henan Construction	1–1	Guangzhou Evergrande	Zhengzhou
19:45 UTC+8	Netto 66'		Gao Zhilin 56'	Stadium: Hanghai Stadium; Attendance: 20,688; Referee: Fan Qi

10 September 2011 Round 22	Guangzhou Evergrande	2–0	Shandong Luneng	Guangzhou
20:00 UTC+8	Gao Lin 20'; Wu Pingfeng 24'			Stadium: Tianhe Stadium; Attendance: 43,869; Referee: Ma Li

14 September 2011 Round 23	Shanghai Shenhua	0–2	Guangzhou Evergrande	Shanghai
19:45 UTC+8			Conca 17'; Wu Pingfeng 56'	Stadium: Hongkou Stadium; Attendance: 18,232; Referee: Ma Li

18 September 2011 Round 24	Changchun Yatai	2–1	Guangzhou Evergrande	Changchun
19:30 UTC+8	Arrechea 15'; Pei Shuai 84'		Sun Xiang 56'	Stadium: Development Area Stadium; Attendance: 28,669; Referee: Xu Fuxin

24 September 2011 Round 25	Guangzhou Evergrande	4–0	Tianjin Teda	Guangzhou
20:00 UTC+8	Conca 13', 82'; Muriqui 30'; Gao Lin 74'			Stadium: Tianhe Stadium; Attendance: 48,383; Referee: Fan Qi

28 September 2011 Round 26	Shaanxi Renhe	1–4	Guangzhou Evergrande	Xi'an
17:00 UTC+8	Wan Houliang 26'		Gao Lin 36', 51'; Zheng Zhi 84'; Conca 86'	Stadium: Shaanxi Province Stadium; Attendance: 25,360; Referee: Wang Di

16 October 2011 Round 27	Guangzhou Evergrande	3–0	Shanghai Shenhua	Guangzhou
20:00 UTC+8	Conca 14' (pen.); Muriqui 34', 36'			Stadium: Tianhe Stadium; Attendance: 49,693; Referee: Li Jun

22 October 2011 Round 28	Jiangsu Sainty	5–2	Guangzhou Evergrande	Nanjing
15:30 UTC+8	Jevtić 19'; Sun Ke 45'; Dănălache 45+3', 53' (pen.) de la Haza 86'		Muriqui 80' (pen.), 82'	Stadium: Nanjing Olympic Sports Center; Attendance: 31,856; Referee: Xu Hang

29 October 2011 Round 29	Guangzhou Evergrande	3–0	Hangzhou Greentown	Guangzhou
15:30 UTC+8	Muriqui 10', 85'; Jiang Ning 71'			Stadium: Tianhe Stadium; Attendance: 35,856; Referee: Wang Di

2 November 2011 Round 30	Chengdu Blades	2–2	Guangzhou Evergrande	Chengdu
15:30 UTC+8	Wang Kai 10', 90+3' (pen.)		Gao Zhilin 46'; Zhang Linpeng 89'	Stadium: Chengdu Sports Centre; Attendance: 6,245; Referee: Wang Di

=== Chinese FA Cup ===
4 May 2011 First round	Guangzhou Evergrande	3–2	Guizhou Zhicheng	Guangzhou
19:30 UTC+8	Muriqui 62', 64' (pen.), 78'		Wang Lichun 4'; Mauro 90'	Stadium: Yuexiushan Stadium; Attendance: 14,380; Referee: Bai Hua

12 May 2011 Second round	Shaanxi Renhe	1–1 (11–10 p)	Guangzhou Evergrande	Xi'an
15:30 UTC+8	Yu Hai 68'		Muriqui 45' (pen.)	Stadium: Shaanxi Province Stadium; Attendance: 21,680; Referee: Wang Zhe
	Penalties
	Firmani (penalty scored); Qu Bo (penalty missed); Sun Jihai (penalty scored); Oravec (penalty scored); Zhao Xuri (penalty scored); Yu Hai (penalty scored); Rao Weihui (penalty scored); Bajalica (penalty missed); Djulbic (penalty scored); Wan Houliang (penalty scored); Zhang Lie (penalty scored); Firmani (penalty scored); Qu Bo (penalty scored)		Muriqui (penalty missed); Gao Lin (penalty scored); Feng Xiaoting (penalty scored); Jiang Ning (penalty scored); Zheng Zhi (penalty scored); Sun Xiang (penalty scored); Paulão (penalty scored); Wu Pingfeng (penalty missed); Li Jianhua (penalty scored); Cho Won-Hee (penalty scored); Yang Jun (penalty scored); Muriqui (penalty scored); Gao Lin (penalty missed)

== Squad statistics ==
Updated to games played on 2 November 2011.
No appearances player not listed.

Name	Pos.	League					FA Cup					Total				
Name	Pos.	Apps	Starts	Goals	(yellow card) YC	(red card) RC	Apps	Starts	Goals	(yellow card) YC	(red card) RC	Apps	Starts	Goals	(yellow card) YC	(red card) RC
(South Korea) Cho Won-Hee	MF	30	30	0	4	0	2	1	0	0	0	32	31	0	4	0
(China) Gao Lin	FW	29	28	11	3	0	2	1	0	0	0	31	29	11	3	0
(Brazil) Paulão	DF	28	27	0	6	0	2	2	0	0	0	30	29	0	6	0
(China) Wu Pingfeng	MF	28	23	4	3	0	2	2	0	1	0	30	25	4	4	0
(China) Li Jianhua	DF	28	24	0	1	0	2	1	0	1	0	30	25	0	2	0
(China) Feng Xiaoting	DF	27	27	2	5	1	1	1	0	0	0	28	28	2	5	1
(Brazil) Muriqui	FW	26	26	16	4	0	2	1	4	0	0	28	27	20	4	0
(China) Zheng Zhi	MF	25	25	5	10	2	2	2	0	0	0	27	27	5	10	2
(China) Sun Xiang	DF	25	25	1	1	0	2	2	0	0	0	27	27	1	1	0
(China) Jiang Ning	FW	21	3	4	1	0	2	1	0	0	0	23	4	4	1	0
(China) Yang Hao	MF	22	17	0	6	0	0	0	0	0	0	22	17	0	6	0
(China) Yang Jun	GK	20	19	0	2	0	1	0	0	0	0	21	19	0	2	0
(China) Zhang Linpeng	DF	16	8	1	1	0	2	2	0	0	0	18	10	1	1	0
(Argentina) Darío Conca	MF	15	14	9	0	0	0	0	0	0	0	15	14	9	0	0
(China) Gao Zhilin	MF	13	6	3	0	0	1	1	0	0	0	14	7	3	0	0
(China) Li Shuai	GK	11	11	0	0	0	2	2	0	0	0	13	13	0	0	0
(Brazil) Cléo	FW	10	9	10	1	0	1	1	0	0	0	11	10	10	1	0
(Brazil) Renato Cajá	MF	10	8	0	0	0	1	1	0	0	0	11	9	0	0	0
(China) Li Yan	MF	6	0	0	0	0	1	1	0	0	0	7	1	0	0	0
(China) Feng Junyan	MF	6	0	0	0	0	0	0	0	0	0	6	0	0	0	0
(China) Ye Weichao	FW	4	0	1	0	0	0	0	0	0	0	4	0	1	0	0
(China) Shi Hongjun	MF	3	0	0	0	0	0	0	0	0	0	3	0	0	0	0
(China) Peng Shaoxiong	MF	1	0	0	0	0	0	0	0	0	0	1	0	0	0	0
(China) Tang Dechao	DF	1	0	0	0	0	0	0	0	0	0	1	0	0	0	0
(China) Yang Yihu	FW	1	0	0	0	0	0	0	0	0	0	1	0	0	0	0
Total	––	––	––	67	48	3	––	––	4	2	0	––	––	71	50	3
