= Yang Yihu =

Chinese footballer

Yang Yihu 杨一虎
Personal information
- Full name: Yang Yihu
- Date of birth: 16 September 1991 (age 35)
- Place of birth: Lufeng, Guangdong, China
- Height: 1.75 m (5 ft 9 in)
- Positions: Left winger; left-back

Team information
- Current team: Meizhou Hakka
- Number: 17

Youth career
- 2006–2009: Guangzhou Pharmaceutical

Senior career*
Years	Team	Apps	(Gls)
2009–2011	Guangzhou Evergrande	5	(0)
2012–2019	Beijing Renhe	73	(8)
2018	→ Heilongjiang Lava Spring (loan)	14	(1)
2020–	Meizhou Hakka	111	(3)

International career^{‡}
2009–2010	China U-20	8	(7)
2012–2013	China U-22	5	(3)
- * Club domestic league appearances and goals as of 31 December 2025 ‡ National team caps and goals as of 19 July 2015

Yang Yihu (simplified Chinese: 杨一虎; traditional Chinese: 楊一虎; pinyin: Yáng Yīhǔ; born 16 September 1991) is a Chinese footballer who currently plays for Meizhou Hakka.

== Club career ==
Yang Yihu was promoted to Guangzhou's first team in 2009 but did not appear in a single league game that season. He made his debut for Guangzhou on 3 April 2010 in a 3-1 win against Beijing BIT and was described by then manager Lee Jang-Soo as a hot prospect for the future. However, Yang did not have much of a chance to play for Guangzhou as the club had many strong attacking players such as Muriqui, Gao Lin, Jiang Ning, Darío Conca and Cléo. On 3 August 2011, he scored the only goal for Guangzhou in a 7-1 friendly defeat against Real Madrid during Real Madrid's tour in China. He made his first tier league debut on 21 August 2011 in a 1-1 draw against Henan Construction, coming on as a substitute for Yang Hao in the 80th minute. This was the only league game he played in during the 2011 league season, however Yang did score eleven goals for Guangzhou Evergrande's reserve team in the reserve league.

Yang transferred to fellow Chinese Super League side Guizhou Renhe for a reported fee of ¥1 million on 5 January 2012. He made his debut on 10 March 2012 in a 2-1 win against Shandong Luneng, coming on as a substitute for Yu Hai in the second half. His first senior goal came against Hangzhou Greentown on 17 June 2012, coming on as a substitute to score. He scored a second goal in the same match, which ensured that Guizhou secured a 5-0 win. He made sixteen appearances and scored two goals in the 2012 league season as the club achieved fourth place and gained the entry into the AFC Champions League. On 28 February 2018, Yang was loaned to China League One newcomer Heilongjiang Lava Spring.

On 13 February 2020, he would transfer to second tier club Meizhou Hakka. He would go on to make his debut in a league game on 13 September 2020 against Liaoning Shenyang Urban that ended in a 2-0 victory. After the game he would go on to establish himself as a vital member of the team that gained promotion to the top tier after coming second within the division at the end of the 2021 China League One campaign.

== International career ==
Yang was called up to the Chinese under-20 national team by Su Maozhen in June 2009. He scored seven goals in five matches during the 2010 AFC U-19 Championship qualification. He made three appearances for the under-20 side in the 2010 AFC U-19 Championship but did not score during the tournament. China lost to North Korea in the quarterfinals and failed to qualify for the 2011 FIFA U-20 World Cup because of the loss.

Yang was first called up to the Chinese under-22 national team in April 2012. He made his debut for the under-22 side on 9 May 2012 in a 2-2 draw against Malawi. He scored his first goal for the team in his following match on 10 June 2012 as China won 1-0 against Malaysia. After some stellar performances, Yang was included in the squad for the 2013 AFC U-22 Asian Cup qualification. He scored in the opening match against the host team Laos on 23 June 2013.

== Personal life ==
On 29 September 2016, Yang was arrested at Shenzhen, on suspicion of drink driving.

== Career statistics ==
Statistics accurate as of match played 31 December 2025.

Club	Season	League			National Cup		Continental		Other		Total	
Club	Season	Division	Apps	Goals	Apps	Goals	Apps	Goals	Apps	Goals	Apps	Goals
Guangzhou Evergrande	2009	Chinese Super League	0	0	-		-		-		0	0
Guangzhou Evergrande	2010	China League One	4	0	-		-		-		4	0
Guangzhou Evergrande	2011	Chinese Super League	1	0	0	0	-		-		1	0
Guangzhou Evergrande	Total		5	0	0	0	0	0	0	0	5	0
Guizhou Renhe/Beijing Renhe	2012	Chinese Super League	16	2	2	0	-		-		18	2
Guizhou Renhe/Beijing Renhe	2013	Chinese Super League	6	0	2	1	3	0	-		11	1
Guizhou Renhe/Beijing Renhe	2014	Chinese Super League	17	2	2	1	2	0	0 (Note: Appearance in Chinese FA Super Cup)	0	21	3
Guizhou Renhe/Beijing Renhe	2015	Chinese Super League	9	2	3	1	-		-		12	3
Guizhou Renhe/Beijing Renhe	2016	China League One	15	2	0	0	-		-		15	2
Guizhou Renhe/Beijing Renhe	2017	China League One	4	0	1	2	-		-		5	2
Guizhou Renhe/Beijing Renhe	2019	Chinese Super League	6	0	1	0	-		-		7	0
Guizhou Renhe/Beijing Renhe	Total		73	8	11	5	5	0	0	0	89	13
Heilongjiang Lava Spring (loan)	2018	China League One	14	1	0	0	-		-		14	1
Meizhou Hakka	2020	China League One	12	0	0	0	-		-		12	0
Meizhou Hakka	2021	China League One	30	1	0	0	-		-		30	1
Meizhou Hakka	2022	Chinese Super League	24	1	1	1	-		-		25	2
Meizhou Hakka	2023	Chinese Super League	16	1	2	0	-		-		18	1
Meizhou Hakka	2024	Chinese Super League	11	0	1	0	-		-		12	0
Meizhou Hakka	2025	Chinese Super League	18	0	1	0	-		-		19	0
Meizhou Hakka	Total		111	3	5	1	0	0	0	0	116	4
Career total			203	12	16	6	5	0	0	0	224	18

== Honours ==
=== Club ===
Guangzhou Evergrande

- Chinese Super League: 2011
- China League One: 2010

Guizhou Renhe

- Chinese FA Cup: 2013
- Chinese FA Super Cup: 2014
