= Tan Jiajun =

Chinese footballer

Tan Jiajun 谭家军
Personal information
- Full name: Tan Jiajun
- Date of birth: 17 December 1993 (age 32)
- Place of birth: Guangzhou, Guangdong, China
- Height: 1.77 m (5 ft 9 1/2 in)
- Position: Midfielder

Team information
- Current team: Fujian Quanzhou Qinggong

Youth career
- Guangzhou Evergrande

Senior career*
Years	Team	Apps	(Gls)
2011	Guangzhou Youth	19	(5)
2012–2016	Guangzhou Evergrande	2	(0)
2017–2018	Meizhou Hakka	17	(0)
2018	→ Shenzhen Pengcheng (loan)	14	(3)
2019	Shenzhen Pengcheng	28	(4)
2020	Shenzhen Bogang	9	(0)
2021	Meixian Qiuxiang		
2022-	Fujian Quanzhou Qinggong	0	(0)
- * Club domestic league appearances and goals as of 25 May 2022

Tan Jiajun (Chinese: 谭家军; pinyin: Tán Jiājūn; born 17 December 1993 in Guangzhou) is a Chinese footballer who currently plays for Chinese club Fujian Quanzhou Qinggong.

== Club career ==
Tan Jiajun joined Guangzhou Evergrande's youth academy after he graduated from his high school. He played for the club's youth team Guangzhou Youth in the China League Two and scored five goals in 19 appearances in the 2011 season. He was promoted to Guangzhou's first team by then manager Lee Jang-Soo in 2012. On 11 May 2012, he made his debut for the club in a 3–1 loss against Dalian Shide, coming on as a substitute for Gao Zhilin in the 82nd minute. He suffered a cruciate ligament rupture in 2013 and was sent to the reserved team in 2015 and 2016.

In February 2017, Tan moved to China League One side Meizhou Hakka.

== Career statistics ==
As of 12 October 2019

Club performance			League		Cup		League Cup		Continental		Others		Total	
Season	Club	League	Apps	Goals	Apps	Goals	Apps	Goals	Apps	Goals	Apps	Goals	Apps	Goals
China PR			League		FA Cup		CSL Cup		Asia		Super Cup		Total	
2011	Guangzhou Youth	China League Two	19	5	-		-		-		-		19	5
2012	Guangzhou Evergrande	Chinese Super League	2	0	0	0	-		0	0	0	0	2	0
2013	Guangzhou Evergrande	Chinese Super League	0	0	0	0	-		0	0	0	0	0	0
2014	Guangzhou Evergrande	Chinese Super League	0	0	0	0	-		0	0	1	0	1	0
2017	Meizhou Hakka	China League One	16	0	1	0	-		-		-		17	0
2018	Meizhou Hakka	China League One	1	0	1	0	-		-		-		2	0
2018	Shenzhen Pengcheng	China League Two	14	3	0	0	-		-		-		14	3
2019	Shenzhen Pengcheng	China League Two	28	4	0	0	-		-		-		28	4
Total	China PR		79	12	1	0	0	0	0	0	1	0	81	12

== Honours ==
=== Club ===
Guangzhou Evergrande

- Chinese Super League: 2012, 2013, 2014
- Chinese FA Super Cup: 2012
- Chinese FA Cup: 2012
- AFC Champions League: 2013
