= Paulão (footballer, born 1986) =

Brazilian footballer

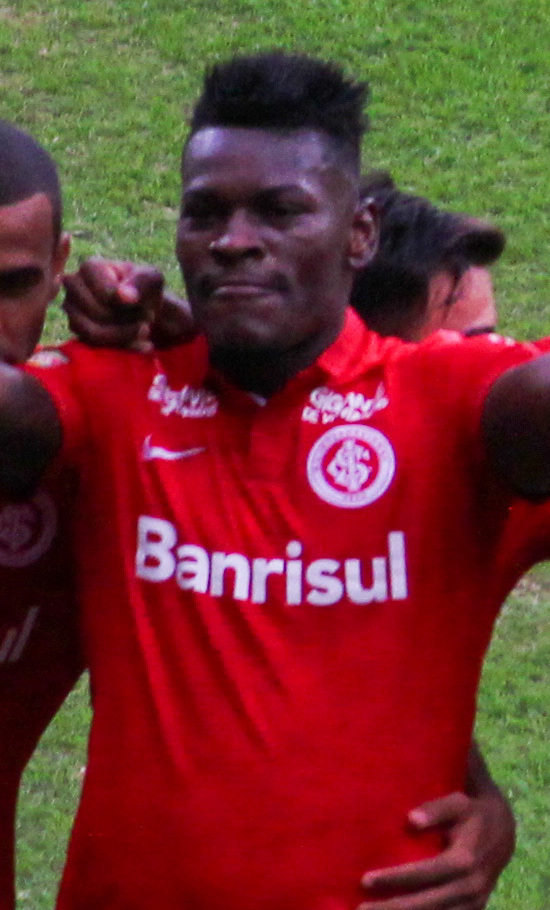

Personal information
- Full name: Paulo Marcos de Jesus Ribeiro
- Date of birth: 25 February 1986 (age 40)
- Place of birth: Salvador, Brazil
- Height: 1.87 m (6 ft 1 1/2 in)
- Position: Centre-back

Team information
- Current team: Paysandu

Youth career
- Independente-RJ

Senior career*
Years	Team	Apps	(Gls)
2008	Itapirense	17	(1)
2008–2009	Universal	0	(0)
2008–2009	→ ASA (loan)	38	(2)
2009	→ Grêmio Prudente (loan)	1	(0)
2010–2011	Gremio Prudente	22	(0)
2010–2011	→ Grêmio (loan)	20	(0)
2011–2013	Guangzhou Evergrande	47	(0)
2013	→ Cruzeiro (loan)	13	(2)
2014–2019	Internacional	119	(9)
2017–2018	→ Vasco da Gama (loan)	38	(1)
2018	→ América Mineiro (loan)	40	(3)
2019	→ Fortaleza (loan)	12	(2)
2020–2021	Fortaleza	38	(1)
2021–2022	Cuiabá	61	(2)
2023–	Paysandu	11	(1)
- * Club domestic league appearances and goals as of 13 August 2023

Paulo Marcos de Jesus Ribeiro (born 25 February 1986), commonly known as Paulão, is a Brazilian footballer who plays as a central defender for Paysandu.

== Club career ==
=== Early career ===
In January 2008, Paulão was signed by Itapirense in 2-year contract. He was infamously cautioned 8 times and suspended twice in the Campeonato Paulista Série A3. In June 2008 he was signed by Universal Futebol Clube and immediately loaned to ASA for the 2008 Campeonato Brasileiro Série C. Paulão remained in ASA in 2009 season, winning the Campeonato Alagoano. His team also finished as the runner-up of 2009 Campeonato Brasileiro Série C in 2009.

=== Grêmio Prudente ===
On 21 September 2009 he was loaned to Grêmio Barueri during the 2009 Campeonato Brasileiro Série A. He made his Campeonato Brasileiro Série A debut on 6 December 2009.

In January 2010, Barueri relocated to Presidente Prudente and bought Paulão from Universal. He became a regular starter of the team, made 16 starts in the 2010 Campeonato Paulista, finished as the semi-finalists. He also played 6 times in the 2010 Campeonato Brasileiro Série A, and was sent off in the opening game. He extended his contract in June.

=== Grêmio ===
On 29 August 2010 he left for fellow top division team Grêmio de Porto Alegre in one-year loan. Paulão made his club debut on 11 September 2010, winning Corinthians 1–0. Since then he made 13 starts for Grêmio, made a total of 20 appearances in 2010 Campeonato Brasileiro Série A for Grêmio and Grêmio Prudente. In 2011 season, Paulão played 6 out of possible 10 games of 2011 Campeonato Gaúcho, reached semi-final of the first stage, the Piratini Cup. He left the club before the final. He was the starting centre-back in the 2011 Copa Libertadores.

=== Guangzhou Evergrande ===
On 2 March 2011, Chinese Super League club Guangzhou Evergrande announced that they had signed Paulão on a four-year deal with a fee of US$3.5 million. It was reported that Grêmio Prudente and Grêmio would divided the transfer fee in fifty-fifty. Paulão made his CSL debut for Guangzhou against Dalian Shide on 2 April 2011. He made 28 appearances in the 2011 league season as Guangzhou Evergrande successfully achieved Super League champion for the first time in the club's history.

=== Return to Brazil ===
On 6 January 2013, Paulão was loaned to Cruzeiro for one year. On 2 January 2014, Internacional announced that they would sign Paulão on a three-year contract. In May 2017, he signed a loan deal with Vasco da Gama. In August 2018 he signed a loan deal until December 2019 with América Mineiro.

== Career statistics ==
Appearances and goals by club, season and competition
Club	Season	League			State League		Cup		Continental		Other		Total	
Club	Season	Division	Apps	Goals	Apps	Goals	Apps	Goals	Apps	Goals	Apps	Goals	Apps	Goals
Itapirense	2008	Paulista A3	—		17	1	—		—		—		17	1
ASA	2008	Série C	4	0	—		—		—		—		4	0
ASA	2009	Série C	12	0	22	2	2	0	—		—		36	2
ASA	Total		16	0	22	2	2	0	—		—		40	2
Grêmio Prudente	2009	Série A	1	0	—		—		—		—		1	0
Grêmio Prudente	2010	Série A	6	0	16	0	0	0	0	0	—		22	0
Grêmio Prudente	Total		7	0	16	0	0	0	0	0	—		23	0
Grêmio (loan)	2010	Série A	14	0	—		—		—		—		14	0
Grêmio (loan)	2011	Série A	0	0	6	0	—		4 (Note: Appearance(s) in Copa Libertadores)	0	—		10	0
Grêmio (loan)	Total		14	0	6	0	—		4	0	—		24	0
Guangzhou Evergrande	2011	Chinese Super League	28	0	—		2	0	—		—		30	0
Guangzhou Evergrande	2012	Chinese Super League	19	0	—		2	0	—		—		21	0
Guangzhou Evergrande	Total		47	0	—		4	0	—		—		51	0
Cruzeiro (loan)	2013	Série A	2	1	11	1	1	0	—		—		14	2
Internacional	2014	Série A	22	3	11	0	4	0	2 (Note: Appearance(s) in Copa Sudamericana)	0	—		39	3
Internacional	2015	Série A	24	2	11	0	4	0	1	0	—		40	2
Internacional	2016	Série A	31	0	15	4	3	0	—		3 (Note: Appearance(s) in Primeira Liga)	0	53	4
Internacional	2017	Série B	0	0	7	0	3	1	—		2	0	12	1
Internacional	Total		77	5	42	4	14	1	3	0	5	0	143	10
Vasco da Gama (loan)	2017	Série A	24	1	—		—		—		—		24	1
Vasco da Gama (loan)	2018	Série A	5	0	9	0	1	0	8	1	—		23	1
Vasco da Gama (loan)	Total		29	1	9	0	1	0	8	1	—		47	2
América Mineiro (loan)	2018	Série B	5	0	—		—		—		—		5	0
América Mineiro (loan)	2019	Série B	21	1	14	2	2	0	—		—		37	3
América Mineiro (loan)	Total		26	1	14	2	2	0	—		—		42	3
Fortaleza	2019	Série A	12	2	—		—		—		—		12	2
Fortaleza	2020	Série A	31	0	7	1	2	0	2	0	7 (Note: Appearance(s) in Copa do Nordeste)	0	49	1
Fortaleza	Total		43	2	7	1	2	0	2	0	7	0	61	3
Cuiabá	2021	Série A	35	1	1	0	0	0	—		0	0	36	1
Cuiabá	2022	Série A	14	0	8	1	2	0	1	0	0	0	25	1
Cuiabá	Total		49	1	9	1	2	0	1	0	0	0	61	2
Paysandu	2023	Série C	11	1	0	0	—		—		0	0	11	1
Paysandu	2024	Série B	0	0	0	0	0	0	—		0	0	0	0
Paysandu	Total		11	1	0	0	0	0	—		0	0	11	1
Career total			321	12	155	12	28	1	18	1	12	0	534	26

== Honours ==
ASA

- Campeonato Alagoano: 2009

Guangzhou Evergrande

- Chinese Super League: 2011, 2012
- Chinese FA Cup: 2012
- Chinese FA Super Cup: 2012

Cruzeiro

- Campeonato Brasileiro Série A: 2013

Internacional

- Campeonato Gaúcho: 2014, 2015, 2016

Fortaleza

- Campeonato Cearense: 2020

Cuiabá

- Campeonato Mato-Grossense: 2021, 2022
