= Darío Conca =

Argentine footballer (born 1983)

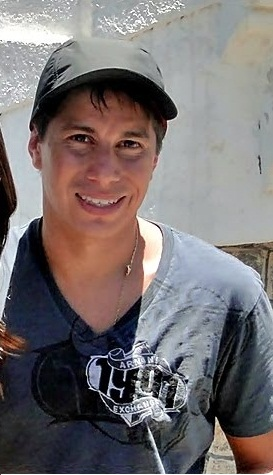
- Conca in 2011

Personal information
- Full name: Darío Leonardo Conca
- Date of birth: 11 May 1983 (age 43)
- Place of birth: General Pacheco, Argentina
- Height: 1.68 m (5 ft 6 in)
- Position: Attacking midfielder

Youth career
- 1999–2000: Tigre
- 2000–2002: River Plate

Senior career*
Years	Team	Apps	(Gls)
1999–2000	Tigre	1	(0)
2000–2008	River Plate	14	(2)
2004–2006	→ Universidad Católica (loan)	65	(13)
2006	→ Rosario Central (loan)	13	(0)
2007	→ Vasco da Gama (loan)	30	(6)
2008	→ Fluminense (loan)	30	(4)
2009–2011	Fluminense	124	(28)
2011–2013	Guangzhou Evergrande	65	(33)
2014	Fluminense	52	(13)
2015–2018	Shanghai SIPG	46	(13)
2017	→ Flamengo (loan)	3	(0)
2019	Austin Bold	3	(0)
Total		446	(112)

International career
2002	Argentina U20	9	(1)
- * Club domestic league appearances and goals

Darío Leonardo Conca (Spanish pronunciation: [daˈɾi.o leoˈnaɾðo ˈkoŋka]; born 11 May 1983) is an Argentine former professional footballer who played as an attacking midfielder. Conca was elected for two consecutive years as the best player of Campeonato Brasileiro Série A in 2009 and 2010. When Conca signed for Guangzhou Evergrande in 2011, he was made the third-highest paid player in the world, behind only Real Madrid's Cristiano Ronaldo and Barcelona's Lionel Messi.

== Club career ==
=== Early career ===
Conca started his career in Argentina's Primera B Nacional and made his debut for Tigre at the age of just 15. River Plate took him just a year later and Conca made the steady rise to River's first team. On 23 November 2003, under then Chilean manager Manuel Pellegrini, Conca made his first team debut in a 1–0 defeat to Chacarita Juniors.

In 2004, however, Conca was loaned to Chilean club Universidad Católica by new River manager Leonardo Astrada. In 2006, River loaned him out again, this time to Rosario Central where after some impressive displays, Vasco da Gama made a successful bid to bring him to Brazil on 5 January 2007, signing an initial one-year loan deal from River Plate. He made his Vasco debut and scored in friendly 4–0 win over Villa Rio on 14 January 2007.

=== Fluminense ===
In 2008, Conca signed a loan deal with Fluminense, and was a key player in the squad under coach Renato Gaúcho. Conca played an important role in the team's 2008 Copa Libertadores campaign, along with others such as Thiago Neves, Thiago Silva, Washington and Cícero. In 2009, he signed a three-year deal with Fluminense. He was voted the best player in Brazil in a poll organized annually by Globo, and was ranked as the 15th-best player in Latin America and the best player in Brazil by Uruguayan newspaper El País. After a successful season where Fluminense won the Brazilian league, Conca renewed his contract with Fluminense for another five years.

=== Guangzhou Evergrande ===
==== 2011 season ====
On 2 July 2011, Chinese Super League club Guangzhou Evergrande announced that they had officially signed Conca on a two-and-a-half-year deal for a domestic record fee of $10 million (This record was broken by Lucas Barrios in May 2012), he was given the number 15 shirt. It was reported that Conca's annual salary would be $12.5 million, putting him among the highest paid players in the world. He scored his first goal for the club on his debut in a 5–0 win against Nanchang Hengyuan on 14 July 2011. Conca scored 9 goals in 15 appearances as Guangzhou became Super League champion for the first time in the club's history. He was named by local fans and media as "the king of Tianhe Stadium".

==== 2012 season ====
At the start of the 2012 season, Conca helped Guangzhou win the 2012 Chinese FA Super Cup against Tianjin Teda on 25 February. On 7 March, he scored his first two goals in a 2012 AFC Champions League group stage match, which was Guangzhou's first AFC Champions League match, as Guangzhou defeated K-League champions Jeonbuk Hyundai Motors 5–1 away. Conca continued his excellent form in March and April. He managed to score five goals in the first eight rounds of the domestic league and three goals in the first four group stage games of the AFC Champions League as Guangzhou came first in both competitions. On 1 May, he scored a penalty after Guangzhou's Zhang Linpeng had been brought down in a home Champions League match against Jeonbuk Hyundai Motors. In the 60th minute of that match, however, he was substituted out, and Guangzhou would later go on to lose 3–1 after Jeonbuk Hyundai's Lee Dong-gook scored two goals in injury time. On 3 May, Conca expressed his disappointment about the team manager Lee Jang-soo's decision on his Weibo account, saying:

I don't understand why they always sideline me with the excuse that I'm exhausted and need rest. How could I have scored a crucial penalty if I'm not in condition? And why does the coach always have Conca take a rest?

On 4 May, Conca received a ban of nine matches (including reserve league match) at least and was fined ¥1 million by the club for his remarks on Weibo. On 15 May, the club decided to include him on the roster for the last group match of AFC Champions League against Buriram United. He scored the winning goal of the match in the 90th minute, sealing a place in the knockout phase for the Chinese Super League side. His ban was officially canceled when former Italian World Cup-winning football manager Marcello Lippi was appointed as the new manager of club on 17 May. After joining Guangzhou Evergrande for just one year, Conca handed in a transfer request on 4 July. However, after several talks with the club, Conca changed his mind and said he would stay in Guangzhou at least until the end of the season. On 27 October, Conca assisted Gao Lin to score the league-winning goal in the injury time against Liaoning Whowin, which gave Guangzhou Evergrande their second Super League title and became the first team ever to defend the CSL title. In his first full year in China, Conca played 36 matches and scored 17 goals for Guangzhou and was named as the candidate for Chinese Football Association Footballer of the Year award. However, he lost to Jiangsu Sainty's Cristian Dănălache, top scorer of the league, in November 2012.

==== 2013 season ====
On 30 November 2012, Conca decided to leave the Chinese side, writing a letter for Guangzhou president, Liu Yongzhuo, with the following words: "I have things to do in my life. One of this things is coming back to Brazil". Therefore, his intentions were to come back to Fluminense, where he is still seen as an idol. However, Fluminense was not able to come to an agreement with Guangzhou Evergrande so Conca returned to China on 3 January 2013.

Conca continued to play as the crucial player in Lippi's tactics in this season. On 26 February 2013, he made his season debut in the first match of 2013 AFC Champions League group stage, which Guangzhou beat J. League Division 1 side Urawa Red Diamonds 3–0 at Tianhe Stadium. He scored his first goal of the season in the 2013 Chinese FA Super Cup on 3 March 2013, however, Guangzhou finally lost to Jiangsu Sainty 2–1, failing to defend the Super Cup title. Conca was linked with Fluminense again in the summer, but he emphasized that he would fulfill his contract and return to Brazil at the end of 2013 when his contract ends. He scored 14 goals in his 26 league appearances in the season which ensured Guangzhou win the Super League title three times in a row. In the 2013 AFC Champions League, Conca scored six goals in five successive matches from second leg of round of 16 to second leg of semi-finals as Guangzhou became the first Chinese club to reach the final of the AFC Club Championship since 1998. On 3 November 2013, in the last match of the league which Guangzhou beat Wuhan Zall 5–0, Conca stripped off his shirt when he scored his first goal of the match, showing the words "No matter where I am, you will always be in my mind. Thank you" to say goodbye to Guangzhou Evergrande's fans. Conca played both legs of 2013 AFC Champions League Final which Guangzhou secured the title on the away goals ruling against K-League side FC Seoul on 9 November 2013.

On 17 November 2013, on the winning by 2–1 against São Paulo at Maracanã Stadium, Fluminense announced Conca's return to club in an unusual way: on screen of the field he was confirmed as first player for Tricolor das Laranjeiras for 2014 season. Before heading back to Brazil, Conca, however, is available to play for Guangzhou Evergrande until the end of the 2013 FIFA Club World Cup in December. Conca won Chinese Football Association Footballer of the Year award on 24 November 2013. In December, although Guangzhou failed to defend the FA Cup title by losing Guizhou Renhe 3–2 on aggregate in the 2013 Chinese FA Cup final, Conca was awarded the most valuable player of FA Cup. Conca played all three matches for Guangzhou Evergrande in the FIFA Club World Cup. He scored two goals in the tournament. The first came on the quarter-finals when Guangzhou beat African champions Al Ahly 2–0 and the second came on his last match for the club when Guangzhou lost to Copa Libertadores winners Atlético Mineiro 3–2 in the third place match.

In 99 competitive games for the club, Conca scored 54 goals and assisted 37.

=== Return to Fluminense ===
On 18 January 2014, Conca made his return debut for Fluminense in the first match of 2014 Campeonato Carioca. He assisted two goals in the match, however, Fluminense were finally defeated by Madureira 3–2.

=== Shanghai SIPG ===
On 22 January 2015, Fluminense announced that Conca would be joining Shanghai SIPG.

On 8 July 2015, he scored a penalty to equalize the game for his team against Guangzhou R&F in the China FA cup. His team went on to win 2–1 at Shanghai stadium.

On 12 July 2015, Conca scored two goals in addition to an assist in the away win against Guangzhou R&F. The game ended 3–2 for Shanghai SIPG.

On 15 March 2016, he assisted Elkson's second goal in the 2016 AFC Champions league group stage match against Gamba Osaka to give Shanghai a 2–1 lead, Shanghai went on to win the match and Conca was praised for his good performance.

On 10 April 2016, he provided an assist in a 4–0 win against Liaoning FC. He also scored a goal which was later canceled for offside.

=== Flamengo ===
Conca joined Flamengo on a year-long loan from Shanghai SIPG on 3 January 2017.

=== Austin Bold ===
Conca joined the new club Austin Bold FC playing in the USL Championship. After three games, on 18 April, the club announced that the Bold and Conca have parted ways so he could pursue other football opportunities. On 23 April 2019, he announced that he would be retiring from football to focus on other ventures.

== International career ==
Conca was capped at Argentina's youth national team, but never at the senior team. However, he considered the idea of playing for Brazil in 2015, and Mano Menezes, Brazil's manager at the time, did not rule out including him in Brazil's squad.

== Personal life ==
Conca met his wife Paula Araújo in 2007. They married in Maldives in September 2010. On 15 March 2012, their first son, Benjamin, was born in Guangzhou, China PR. Their second son, Bryan, was born in Shanghai on 18 March 2016.

== Career statistics ==
As of 31 October 2016

Appearances and goals by club, season and competition
Club	Season	League			State league (Note: Includes Campeonato Carioca)		National cup (Note: Includes Copa do Brasil, Chinese FA Cup)		Continental		Other		Total	
Club	Season	Division	Apps	Goals	Apps	Goals	Apps	Goals	Apps	Goals	Apps	Goals	Apps	Goals
River Plate	2002	Argentine Primera División	3	0	—		—		—		—		3	0
River Plate	2003	Argentine Primera División	11	2	—		—		—		—		11	2
River Plate	Total		14	2	—		—		—		—		14	2
Universidad Católica (loan)	2004	Primera División of Chile	18	2	—		—		0	0	—		18	2
Universidad Católica (loan)	2005	Primera División of Chile	24	7	—		—		10 (Note: Appearances in Copa Sudamericana)	2	—		34	9
Universidad Católica (loan)	2006	Primera División of Chile	23	4	—		—		6 (Note: Appearances in Copa Libertadores)	1	—		29	5
Universidad Católica (loan)	Total		65	13	—		—		16	3	—		81	16
Rosario Central (loan)	2006	Argentine Primera División	13	0	—		—		—		—		13	0
Vasco da Gama (loan)	2007	Série A	30	6	11	0	2	0	5	1	—		48	7
Fluminense (loan)	2008	Série A	30	4	12	2	0	0	14	2	—		56	8
Fluminense (loan)	2009	Série A	36	7	16	4	2	0	9	2	—		63	13
Fluminense (loan)	2010	Série A	38	9	15	5	6	0	—		—		59	14
Fluminense (loan)	2011	Série A	7	1	12	2	0	0	8	1	—		27	4
Fluminense (loan)	Total		111	21	55	13	8	0	31	5	—		205	39
Guangzhou Evergrande	2011	Chinese Super League	15	9	—		—		—		—		15	9
Guangzhou Evergrande	2012	Chinese Super League	24	10	—		2	1	9 (Note: Appearances in AFC Champions League)	6	1 (Note: Appearance in Chinese FA Super Cup)	0	36	17
Guangzhou Evergrande	2013	Chinese Super League	26	14	—		4	3	14	8	4 (Note: One appearance and one goal in Chinese FA Super Cup, three appearances and two goals in FIFA Club World Cup)	3	48	28
Guangzhou Evergrande	Total		65	33	—		6	4	23	14	5	3	99	54
Fluminense	2014	Série A	37	9	15	4	5	3	2	0	—		59	16
Shanghai SIPG	2015	Chinese Super League	29	9	—		2	2	—		—		31	11
Shanghai SIPG	2016	Chinese Super League	17	4	—		2	0	8	2	—		27	6
Shanghai SIPG	Total		46	13	—		4	2	8	2	—		58	17
Career total			381	97	81	17	24	9	85	25	5	3	577	151

== Honours ==
Universidad Católica

- Primera División de Chile: 2005 Clausura

Fluminense

- Campeonato Brasileiro Série A: 2010

Guangzhou Evergrande

- AFC Champions League: 2013
- Chinese Super League: 2011, 2012, 2013
- Chinese FA Cup: 2012
- Chinese FA Super Cup: 2012

Flamengo

- Campeonato Carioca: 2017

Individual

- Campeonato Brasileiro Série A Best Fan's Player: 2009, 2010
- Campeonato Brasileiro Série A Best Player: 2010
- Campeonato Brasileiro Série A Team of the Year: 2010
- Bola de Ouro: 2010
- Bola de Prata: 2010
- Troféu Mesa Redonda Best Player: 2010
- Chinese Super League Team of the Year: 2012, 2013, 2015
- AFC Champions League Dream Team: 2013
- Chinese Football Association Footballer of the Year: 2013
- Chinese FA Cup Most Valuable Player: 2013
