= Yuan Ye (footballer) =

Chinese footballer

Personal information
- Date of birth: 22 September 1993 (age 33)
- Place of birth: Zhengzhou, Henan, China
- Height: 1.80 m (5 ft 11 in)
- Position: Midfielder

Team information
- Current team: Henan Jianye
- Number: 32

Senior career*
Years	Team	Apps	(Gls)
2012–	Henan Jianye	3	(0)
2018	→ Hebei Elite (loan)	7	(0)
2021	→ Quanzhou Yassin (loan)	15	(0)
- * Club domestic league appearances and goals as of 14:01, 31 December 2022 (UTC)

Yuan Ye (Chinese: 袁野; born 22 September 1993) is a Chinese footballer currently playing as a midfielder for Henan Jianye.

== Club career ==
Yuan Ye was promoted to the senior team of Henan Jianye during the 2012 Chinese Super League season and would make his debut in a Chinese FA Cup game on 18 September 2012 against Guangzhou Evergrande in a 2-1 defeat.

== Career statistics ==
As of 31 December 2022.

Club	Season	League			Cup		Continental		Other		Total	
Club	Season	Division	Apps	Goals	Apps	Goals	Apps	Goals	Apps	Goals	Apps	Goals
Henan Jianye	2012	Chinese Super League	0	0	1	0	–		–		1	0
Henan Jianye	2013	China League One	0	0	0	0	–		–		0	0
Henan Jianye	2014	Chinese Super League	0	0	1	0	–		–		1	0
Henan Jianye	2015	Chinese Super League	0	0	0	0	–		–		0	0
Henan Jianye	2016	Chinese Super League	0	0	0	0	–		–		0	0
Henan Jianye	2017	Chinese Super League	0	0	0	0	–		–		0	0
Henan Jianye	2019	Chinese Super League	0	0	0	0	–		–		0	0
Henan Jianye	2020	Chinese Super League	3	0	1	0	–		–		4	0
Henan Jianye	Total		3	0	3	0	0	0	0	0	6	0
Hebei Elite (loan)	2018	China League Two	7	0	1	0	–		–		8	0
Quanzhou Yassin (loan)	2021	China League Two	15	0	0	0	–		–		15	0
Career total			25	0	4	0	0	0	0	0	29	0
