= Li Jianhua (footballer) =

Chinese footballer

Li Jianhua 李健华
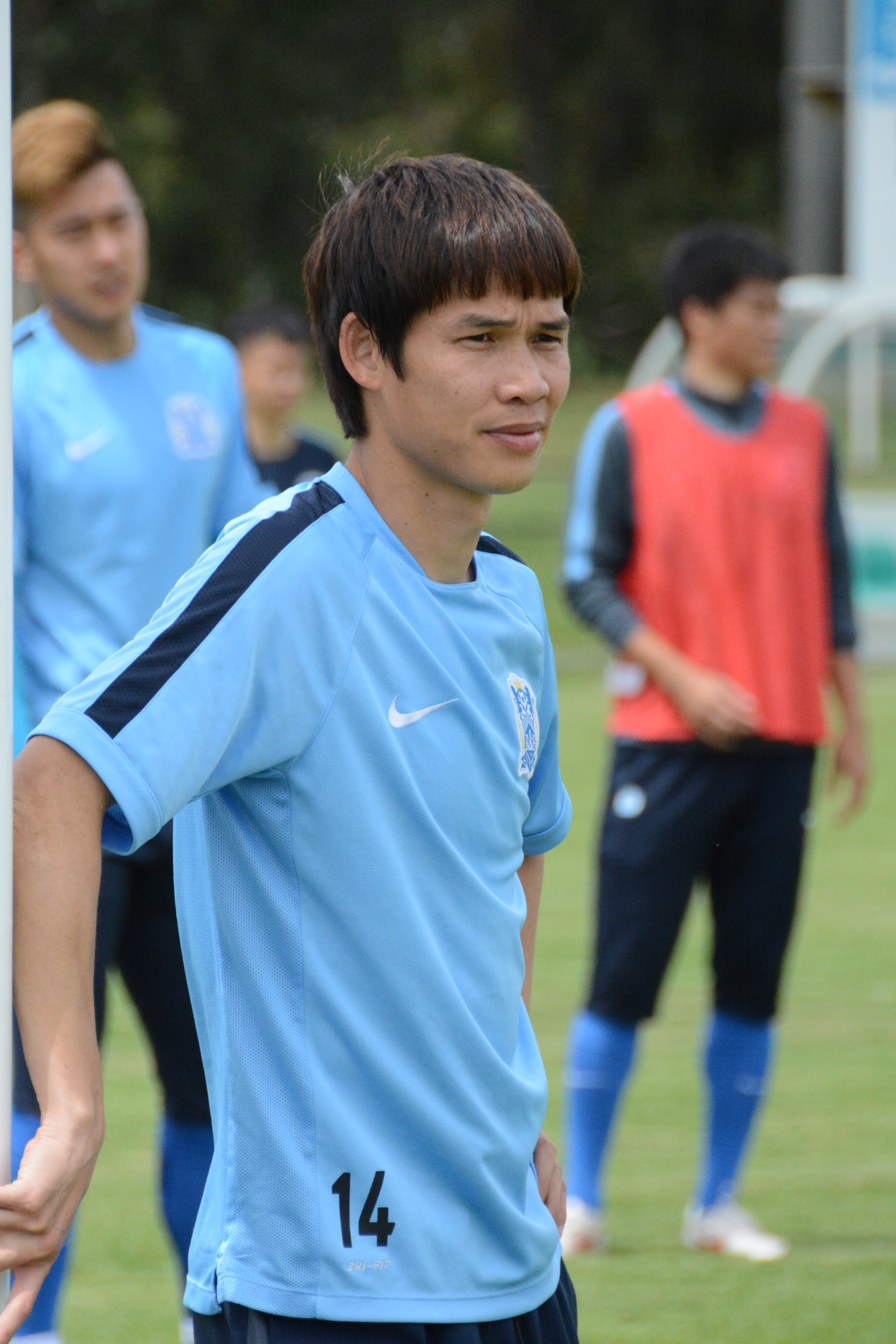

Personal information
- Date of birth: 12 February 1982 (age 44)
- Place of birth: Meixian, Guangdong, China
- Height: 1.75 m (5 ft 9 in)
- Position: Defender

Team information
- Current team: Guangdong South China Tiger
- Number: 14

Senior career*
Years	Team	Apps	(Gls)
2002–2008	Shenzhen Shangqingyin	156	(6)
2009–2012	Guangzhou Evergrande	97	(3)
2013–2015	Guangzhou R&F	19	(0)
2016	Shenzhen Baoxin		
2017–2019	Meixian Techand	27	(0)

International career^{‡}
2008	China	2	(0)
- * Club domestic league appearances and goals as of 3 November 2018 ‡ National team caps and goals as of 4 November 2013

Li Jianhua
- Simplified Chinese: 李健华
- Traditional Chinese: 李健華
Transcriptions
Standard Mandarin
- Hanyu Pinyin: Lǐ Jiànhuá
- IPA: [lì tɕjɛ̂n xwǎ]
Yue: Cantonese
- Jyutping: Lei5 Gin6waa4
- IPA: [lej˩˧ kin˨ wa˩]

Li Jianhua (Chinese: 李健华; pinyin: Lǐ Jiànhuá; Jyutping: Lei5 Gin6waa4) is a retired Chinese footballer who last played as a defender for Guangdong South China Tiger in the China League One.

== Club career ==
He started his career in the 2002 season, quickly establishing himself with 21 appearances and scoring 1 goal in his debut season. Becoming a regular with the Shenzhen Shangqingyin team his highest achievement came in the 2004 Chinese Super League season when Shenzhen won the title, he continued to remain with the team for several further seasons despite them unable to build on their achievements, even flirting with relegation in the 2007 China Super League season. In the beginning of the 2009 season, he transferred to Guangzhou Pharmaceutical F.C., which was later named Guangzhou Evergrande. Along with his teammates Jiang Ning and Wu Pingfeng, Li transferred to Guangzhou Evergrande's opponent Guangzhou R&F in January 2013. He left Guangzhou R&F at the end of 2015 and played for amateur team Shenzhen Baoxin in 2016. On 9 November 2016, Li was signed by his hometown club Meixian Hakka in the China League Two.

== International career ==
Li Jianhua would make his debut against Mexico on 16 April 2008, coming on as a substitute in a 1-0 friendly loss. He would make another substitute appearance for China against El Salvador for another friendly on 23 April 2008, which ended in a 2–2 draw.

== Career statistics ==
Statistics accurate as of match played 3 November 2018.

Club	Season	League		FA Cup		CSL Cup		Total	
Club	Season	Apps	Goals	Apps	Goals	Apps	Goals	Apps	Goals
Shenzhen Xiangxue Eisiti	2002	25	1			–		25	1
Shenzhen Xiangxue Eisiti	2003	23	0			–		23	0
Shenzhen Xiangxue Eisiti	2004	14	1					14	1
Shenzhen Xiangxue Eisiti	2005	21	1					21	1
Shenzhen Xiangxue Eisiti	2006	21	1			–		21	1
Shenzhen Xiangxue Eisiti	2007	25	2	–		–		25	2
Shenzhen Xiangxue Eisiti	2008	27	0	–		–		27	0
Shenzhen Xiangxue Eisiti	Total	156	6					156	6
Guangzhou Evergrande	2009	28	0	–		–		28	0
Guangzhou Evergrande	2010	24	2	–		–		24	2
Guangzhou Evergrande	2011	28	0	2	0	–		30	0
Guangzhou Evergrande	2012	17	1	4	1	4	0	25	2
Guangzhou Evergrande	Total	97	3	6	1	4	0	107	4
Guangzhou R&F	2013	12	0	1	0	–		13	0
Guangzhou R&F	2014	4	0	0	0	–		4	0
Guangzhou R&F	2015	3	0	0	0	–		3	0
Guangzhou R&F	Total	19	0	1	0	0	0	20	0
Meixian Techand	2017	18	0	2	0	–		20	0
Meixian Techand	2018	9	0	1	0	–		10	0
Meixian Techand	Total	27	0	3	0	0	0	30	0

== Honours ==
=== Club ===
Shenzhen Jianlibao

- Chinese Super League: 2004

Guangzhou Evergrande

- Chinese Super League: 2011, 2012
- China League One: 2010
- Chinese FA Cup: 2012
- Chinese FA Super Cup: 2012
