= Shi Hongjun =

Chinese footballer (born 1991)

Shi Hongjun 石鸿俊
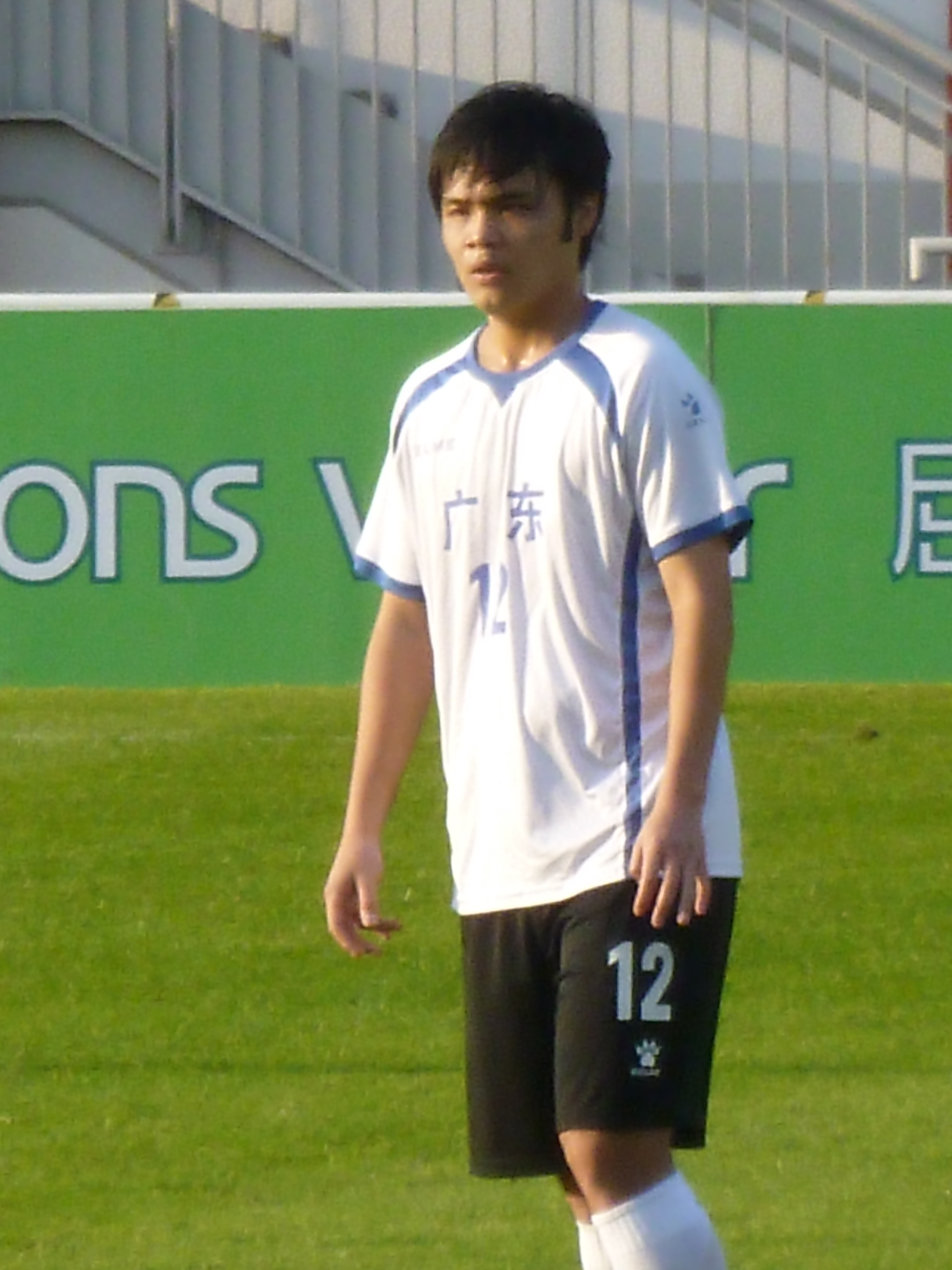

Personal information
- Full name: Shi Hongjun
- Date of birth: 4 October 1991 (age 35)
- Place of birth: Guangzhou, Guangdong, China
- Height: 1.84 m (6 ft 1/2 in)
- Position: Midfielder

Youth career
- Guangzhou Evergrande

Senior career*
Years	Team	Apps	(Gls)
2010–2013	Guangzhou Evergrande	8	(1)
2014–2021	Meizhou Hakka	98	(4)
- * Club domestic league appearances and goals as of 31 December 2021

Shi Hongjun (simplified Chinese: 石鸿俊; traditional Chinese: 石鴻俊; pinyin: Shí Hóngjùn; born 4 October 1991) is a Chinese former footballer who played as a midfielder.

== Club career ==
Shi Hongjun was summoned to Guangzhou Evergrande's first team in December 2009. On 3 April 2010, he made his senior debut in the first round of 2010 season which Guangzhou Evergrande beat Beijing BIT 3–1, coming on as a substitute for Gabriel Melkam in the 68th minute. His first goal came in his second appearance on 21 July 2010 in a 10–0 home victory against Nanjing Yoyo. He was assisted by Sun Xiang who crossed the ball from the left wing and Shi scored the club's eighth goal of the match. He failed to establish himself within the first team after Guangzhou promoted to the Chinese Super League and was released at the end of 2013 season.

In February 2014，Shi moved to China League Two side Meizhou Hakka. He went on to win the 2015 China League Two division and promotion into the second tier. He would then go on to be a vital member of the team for several seasons, however was dropped to the reserves as the club gained promotion to the top tier after coming second within the division at the end of the 2021 China League One campaign.

== Career statistics ==
Statistics accurate as of match played 31 December 2021.

Club	Season	League			National Cup		Continental		Other		Total	
Club	Season	Division	Apps	Goals	Apps	Goals	Apps	Goals	Apps	Goals	Apps	Goals
Guangzhou Evergrande	2010	China League One	2	1	-		-		-		2	1
Guangzhou Evergrande	2011	Chinese Super League	3	0	0	0	-		-		3	0
Guangzhou Evergrande	2012	Chinese Super League	2	0	2	0	0	0	0 (Note: Appearances in Chinese FA Super Cup)	0	4	0
Guangzhou Evergrande	2013	Chinese Super League	1	0	2	0	1	0	0	0	4	0
Guangzhou Evergrande	Total		8	1	4	0	1	0	0	0	13	1
Meizhou Hakka	2014	China League Two	21	1	3	0	-		-		24	1
Meizhou Hakka	2015	China League Two	13	0	3	0	-		-		16	0
Meizhou Hakka	2016	China League One	30	0	0	0	-		-		30	0
Meizhou Hakka	2017	China League One	22	1	0	0	-		-		22	1
Meizhou Hakka	2018	China League One	2	0	0	0	-		-		2	0
Meizhou Hakka	2019	China League One	5	1	1	0	-		-		6	1
Meizhou Hakka	2020	China League One	5	1	1	0	-		-		6	1
Meizhou Hakka	Total		98	4	8	0	0	0	0	0	106	4
Career total			106	5	12	0	1	0	0	0	119	5

== Honours ==
=== Club ===
Guangzhou Evergrande

- AFC Champions League: 2013
- Chinese Super League: 2011, 2012, 2013
- China League One: 2010
- Chinese FA Super Cup: 2012
- Chinese FA Cup: 2012

Meizhou Hakka

- China League Two: 2015
