= Wu Pingfeng =

Chinese footballer

Wu Pingfeng 吴坪枫
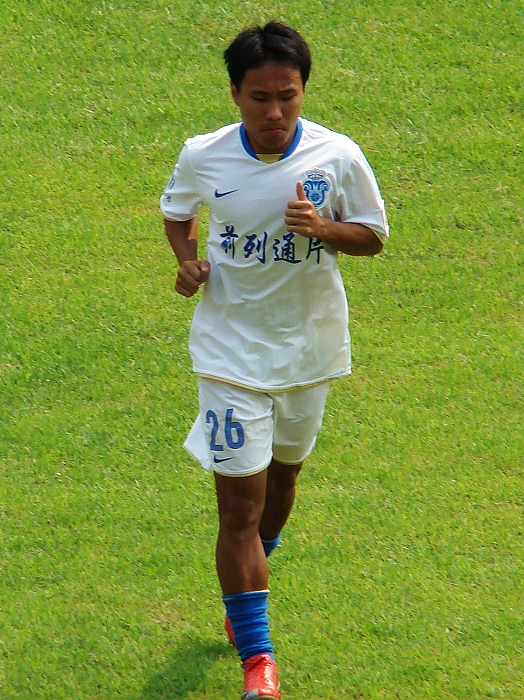

Personal information
- Date of birth: November 1, 1981 (age 44)
- Place of birth: Zhongshan, Guangdong, China
- Height: 1.62 m (5 ft 4 in)
- Position: Winger

Youth career
- Guangdong Youth

Senior career*
Years	Team	Apps	(Gls)
2000–2004	Guangdong Xiongying	49	(5)
2005–2007	Jiangsu Sainty	64	(5)
2008–2012	Guangzhou Evergrande	126	(11)
2013–2014	Guangzhou R&F	6	(0)

International career^{‡}
2002–2011	China	3	(0)
- * Club domestic league appearances and goals as of 4 November 2014 ‡ National team caps and goals as of 4 November 2013

Wu Pingfeng
- Simplified Chinese: 吴坪枫
Transcriptions
Standard Mandarin
- Hanyu Pinyin: Wú Píngfēng
- IPA: [ǔ pʰǐŋ fə́ŋ]
Yue: Cantonese
- Jyutping: Ng4 Ping4fung1
- IPA: [ŋ̭̍ pʰȅŋ fóŋ]

Wu Pingfeng (born November 1, 1981) is a Chinese footballer currently plays for Shenzhen Xinqiao F.C. at Chinese Football Association Member Association Champions League.

== Club career ==
Wu Pingfeng started his professional football career with Guangdong Xiongying in 2002, who were in the third tier of the Chinese league system. At the beginning of the 2003 league season, Guangdong Xiongying were promoted to the second tier of Chinese league system and Wu Pingfeng had established himself within the squad by playing in twenty-five league games. Wu Pingfeng's second season at Guangdong saw him established within the team when he played in twenty-four league games and scored two goals for them. Despite a productive season with the team established within the league, the team had to be disbanded.

Wu transferred to another second-tier club Jiangsu Sainty and established himself as a squad regular by playing in twenty-three league games and scoring two goals. He continued to play for Jiangsu Sainty for three seasons where he played his part in their attempts to push for promotion before he joined already promoted Guangzhou Evergrande at the beginning of the 2008 Chinese Super League season.

Along with his teammates Jiang Ning and Li Jianhua, Wu transferred to Guangzhou Evergrande's opponent Guangzhou R&F in January 2013. He announced his retirement in November 2014.

== International career ==
Wu Pingfeng made his first appearance for the China national team in Bahrain on 7 December 2002, in a friendly match against Syria. His second international cap for China came when he was called to the China national team by José Camacho in October 2011 and played for China on 11 October 2011 in a 1–0 home defeat against Iraq, coming on as a substitute for Yu Hanchao in the second half.

== Career statistics ==
Club	Season	League		FA Cup		Total	
Club	Season	Apps	Goals	Apps	Goals	Apps	Goals
Guangdong Xiongying	2002	?	?	–		?	?
Guangdong Xiongying	2003	25	3	1	0	26	3
Guangdong Xiongying	2004	24	2	0	0	24	2
Guangdong Xiongying	Total	49	5	1	0	50	5
Jiangsu Sainty	2005	23	2	0	0	23	2
Jiangsu Sainty	2006	19	2	2	1	21	3
Jiangsu Sainty	2007	22	1	–		22	1
Jiangsu Sainty	Total	64	5	2	1	66	6
Guangzhou Evergrande	2008	28	2	–		28	2
Guangzhou Evergrande	2009	27	2	–		27	2
Guangzhou Evergrande	2010	24	2	–		24	2
Guangzhou Evergrande	2011	28	4	2	0	30	4
Guangzhou Evergrande	2012	18	1	3	0	21	1
Guangzhou Evergrande	Total	126	11	5	0	131	11
Guangzhou R&F	2013	6	0	0	0	6	0
Guangzhou R&F	2014	0	0	0	0	0	0
Guangzhou R&F	Total	6	0	0	0	6	0

== Honours ==
=== Club ===
Guangzhou Evergrande

- Chinese Super League: 2011, 2012
- China League One: 2010
- Chinese FA Cup: 2012
- Chinese FA Super Cup: 2012
