= Jiang Ning =

Chinese footballer

Personal information
- Date of birth: 1 September 1986 (age 40)
- Place of birth: Qingdao, Shandong, China
- Height: 1.80 m (5 ft 11 in)
- Positions: Striker; winger

Youth career
- 1997–2003: Qingdao Jonoon

Senior career*
Years	Team	Apps	(Gls)
2004–2010	Qingdao Jonoon	149	(35)
2011–2012	Guangzhou Evergrande	36	(8)
2013–2015	Guangzhou R&F	71	(16)
2016–2019	Hebei China Fortune	38	(3)
2019	Taizhou Yuanda	13	(10)
2020–2024	Qingdao Hainiu	72	(8)

International career^{‡}
2007–2008	China U23		
2008–2016	China	32	(6)
Medal record
Representing China
Men's football
EAFF Championship
Bronze medal – third place	2008 China	Team
Gold medal – first place	2010 Japan	Team
AFC U-17 Championship
Bronze medal – third place	2002 UAE	Team
- * Club domestic league appearances and goals as of 8 March 2024 ‡ National team caps and goals as of 7 June 2016

Jiang Ning
- Traditional Chinese: 姜寧
- Simplified Chinese: 姜宁
Transcriptions
Standard Mandarin
- Hanyu Pinyin: Jiāng Nìng

Jiang Ning (Chinese: 姜宁; pinyin: Jiāng Nìng; Mandarin pronunciation: [tɕjáŋ nǐŋ]; born 1 September 1986) is a Chinese former professional footballer who played as a striker and winger.

== Club career ==
Ning began his football career when he joined Qingdao Jonoon's youth academy at the age of 11. He made his debut for the club during the 2004 season against Inter Shanghai on 16 May 2004, scoring a goal in a 2–2 draw. During the 2005 season, he was the team's top league scorer with six goals. During the 2006 season, he was again the club's top scorer with seven goals, including a hat-trick against Chongqing Lifan. During the 2009 season, Jiang's performances for Qingdao saw him receive interest from Russian Premier League side Spartak Moscow. On 20 July 2009, he would have a trial with Spartak Moscow, however the proposed transfer fell through after Spartak Moscow couldn't agree upon the 1,000,000 euro transfer fee which was requested by Qingdao. On 20 May 2010, Jiang suffered damage to his anterior cruciate ligament in a friendly match against Bayer Leverkusen while he was with the national team.

On 25 December 2010, Jiang, who was still recovering from injury, transferred to Guangzhou Evergrande for a reported 800,000 euros. On 9 April 2011, Jiang made his debut for the club against Nanchang Hengyuan in a 1–1 draw where he came on as a substitute for Zheng Zhi. This was followed by his first goal for the club against Shenzhen Ruby on 8 May 2011 in a 1–0 win. With Guangzhou, Jiang would be part of the squad that won the club's first ever top tier league title at the end of the 2011 season. During the 2012 season, the club signed Lucas Barrios which resulted in Jiang's playing time decreasing to 15 league games that season.

Along with his teammates Wu Pingfeng and Li Jianhua, Jiang transferred to fellow Chinese Super League side Guangzhou R&F in January 2013. He made his debut for the club against Liaoning Whowin on 9 March 2013 in a 4–2 loss. This was followed by his first goal for the club against Dalian Aerbin on 25 May 2013 in a 3–2 win where Jiang went on to score a brace.

On 18 December 2015, Jiang transferred to Chinese Super League newcomer Hebei China Fortune. On 4 March 2016, he made his debut for Hebei in a 2–1 away win against Guangzhou R&F. He scored his first goal for the club on 30 April 2016, in a 2–0 victory against Liaoning Whowin.

On 23 February 2025, Jiang retired from professional football.

== International career ==
Jiang played for the Chinese under-23 national team at the 2007 Lunar New Year Cup and the 2007 Toulon Tournament in which China finished as runners-up in both tournaments. He made his senior international debut for the Chinese national team on 17 February 2008 during the 2008 East Asian Football Championship where China lost 3–2 against South Korea. He returned to the Chinese under-23 national team to play in the 2008 Summer Olympics where he participated in all three group games in the tournament as China was knocked out in the first round. After the tournament, Jiang returned to the senior team and he scored his first international goal against Vietnam on 21 January 2009 in a 6–1 win during 2011 AFC Asian Cup qualification.

== Career statistics ==
=== Club ===
As of 19 June 2024

Appearances and goals by club, season and competition
Club	Season	League			National Cup		Continental		Other		Total	
Club	Season	Division	Apps	Goals	Apps	Goals	Apps	Goals	Apps	Goals	Apps	Goals
Qingdao Jonoon	2004	Chinese Super League	16	1	-		-		-		16	1
Qingdao Jonoon	2005	Chinese Super League	17	6	-		-		-		17	6
Qingdao Jonoon	2006	Chinese Super League	26	7	-		-		-		26	7
Qingdao Jonoon	2007	Chinese Super League	26	7	-		-		-		26	7
Qingdao Jonoon	2008	Chinese Super League	22	4	-		-		-		22	4
Qingdao Jonoon	2009	Chinese Super League	28	9	-		-		-		28	9
Qingdao Jonoon	2010	Chinese Super League	14	1	-		-		-		14	1
Qingdao Jonoon	Total		149	35	0	0	0	0	0	0	149	35
Guangzhou Evergrande	2011	Chinese Super League	21	4	2	0	-		-		23	4
Guangzhou Evergrande	2012	Chinese Super League	15	4	2	1	4	0	1	0	22	5
Guangzhou Evergrande	Total		36	8	4	1	4	0	1	0	45	9
Guangzhou R&F	2013	Chinese Super League	26	6	0	0	-		-		26	6
Guangzhou R&F	2014	Chinese Super League	22	7	2	0	-		-		24	7
Guangzhou R&F	2015	Chinese Super League	23	3	2	0	7	1	-		32	4
Guangzhou R&F	Total		71	16	4	0	7	1	0	0	82	17
Hebei China Fortune	2016	Chinese Super League	29	3	0	0	-		-		29	3
Hebei China Fortune	2017	Chinese Super League	4	0	1	0	-		-		5	0
Hebei China Fortune	2018	Chinese Super League	5	0	2	0	-		-		7	0
Hebei China Fortune	Total		38	3	3	0	0	0	0	0	41	3
Taizhou Yuanda	2019	China League Two	10	10	-		-		3	0	13	10
Qingdao Jonoon/ Qingdao Hainiu	2020	China League Two	9	2	-		-		-		9	2
Qingdao Jonoon/ Qingdao Hainiu	2021	China League Two	25	3	0	0	-		-		25	3
Qingdao Jonoon/ Qingdao Hainiu	2022	China League One	28	3	0	0	-		-		28	3
Qingdao Jonoon/ Qingdao Hainiu	2023	Chinese Super League	9	0	0	0	-		-		9	0
Qingdao Jonoon/ Qingdao Hainiu	2024	Chinese Super League	1	0	1	0	-		-		2	0
Qingdao Jonoon/ Qingdao Hainiu	Total		72	8	1	0	0	0	0	0	73	8
Career total			376	80	12	1	11	1	4	0	403	82

=== International goals ===
As of match played 3 June 2016. China score listed first, score column indicates score after each Jiang Ning goal.

International goals by date, venue, cap, opponent, score, result and competition
No.	Date	Venue	Cap	Opponent	Score	Result	Competition
1	21 January 2009	Yellow Dragon Sports Center, Hangzhou, China	9	Vietnam	4–1	6–1	2011 AFC Asian Cup qualification
2	4 June 2009	TEDA Football Stadium, Tianjin, China	12	Saudi Arabia	1–1	1–4	Friendly
3	24 March 2016	Wuhan Sports Center Stadium, Wuhan, China	28	Maldives	1–0	4–0	2018 FIFA World Cup qualification
4	24 March 2016	Wuhan Sports Center Stadium, Wuhan, China	28	Maldives	3–0	4–0	2018 FIFA World Cup qualification
5	24 March 2016	Wuhan Sports Center Stadium, Wuhan, China	28	Maldives	4–0	4–0	2018 FIFA World Cup qualification
6	3 June 2016	Qinhuangdao Olympic Sports Center Stadium, Qinhuangdao, China	30	Trinidad and Tobago	1–0	4–2	Friendly

== Honours ==
=== Club ===
Guangzhou Evergrande

- Chinese Super League: 2011, 2012
- Chinese FA Cup: 2012
- Chinese FA Super Cup: 2012

=== International ===
China PR national football team

- East Asian Football Championship: 2010
