= Gao Zhilin =

Chinese footballer

Gao Zhilin 高志林
Personal information
- Full name: Gao Zhilin
- Date of birth: 8 January 1991 (age 35)
- Place of birth: Wuhua, Guangdong, China
- Height: 1.68 m (5 ft 6 in)
- Position: Midfielder

Youth career
- 2008–2009: Chengdu Blades
- 2009–2010: Guangzhou Evergrande

Senior career*
Years	Team	Apps	(Gls)
2008–2009	Sheffield United (Hong Kong)	5	(0)
2011–2014	Guangzhou Evergrande	16	(3)
2013–2014	→ Meizhou Kejia (loan)	34	(14)
2015–2018	Meizhou Kejia	56	(13)
2019–2020	Fujian Tianxin	26	(3)
2021–2022	Yunnan Yukun		
- * Club domestic league appearances and goals as of 13 October 2019

Gao Zhilin (Chinese: 高志林; pinyin: Gāo Zhìlín; born 8 January 1991) is a Chinese former footballer who played as midfielder.

== Club career ==
Gao Zhilin started his football career in 2008 when he was loaned to Hong Kong First Division League side Sheffield United (Hong Kong) from Chengdu Blades. He transferred to Guangzhou Evergrande in 2010 and was promoted to the first team in 2011. Gao made his debut for Guangzhou on 4 May 2011 in a 3–2 home win against Guizhou Zhicheng in the 2011 Chinese FA Cup and made his league debut on 12 June 2011 in a 1–0 away win against Tianjin Teda. Gao scored his first goal on his second league appearance for Guangzhou on 6 August 2011 in a 4–0 home win against Qingdao Jonoon and scored the last goal of the match. Gao scored three goals in thirteen appearances in the 2011 season as Guangzhou won the top-tier league title for the first time in the club's history.

== Career statistics ==
Statistics accurate as of match played 13 October 2019.

Club performance			League		Cup		League Cup		Continental		Total	
Season	Club	League	Apps	Goals	Apps	Goals	Apps	Goals	Apps	Goals	Apps	Goals
Hong Kong			League		FA Cup		Shield & League Cup		Asia		Total	
2008–09	Sheffield United (Hong Kong)	Hong Kong First Division League	5	0	1	0	0	0	-	-	6	0
China PR			League		FA Cup		CSL Cup		Asia		Total	
2011	Guangzhou Evergrande	Chinese Super League	13	3	1	0	-		-		14	3
2012	Guangzhou Evergrande	Chinese Super League	3	0	1	0	-		0	0	4	0
2013	Meizhou Kejia	China League Two	14	8	0	0	-		-		14	8
2014	Meizhou Kejia	China League Two	20	6	3	0	-		-		23	6
2015	Meizhou Kejia	China League Two	19	8	3	2	-		-		22	10
2016	Meizhou Kejia	China League One	24	5	1	0	-		-		25	5
2017	Meizhou Kejia	China League One	13	0	0	0	-		-		13	0
2018	Meizhou Kejia	China League One	-	-	-	-	-		-		-	-
2019	Fujian Tianxin	China League Two	26	3	1	0	-		-		27	3
Total	Hong Kong		5	0	1	0	0	0	0	0	6	0
Total	China PR		132	33	10	2	0	0	0	0	142	35
Career total			137	33	11	2	0	0	0	0	148	35

== Honours ==
=== Club ===
Guangzhou Evergrande

- Chinese Super League: 2011, 2012
- Chinese FA Super Cup: 2012

Meizhou Kejia

- China League Two: 2015
