= Lee Jang-soo =

South Korean footballer

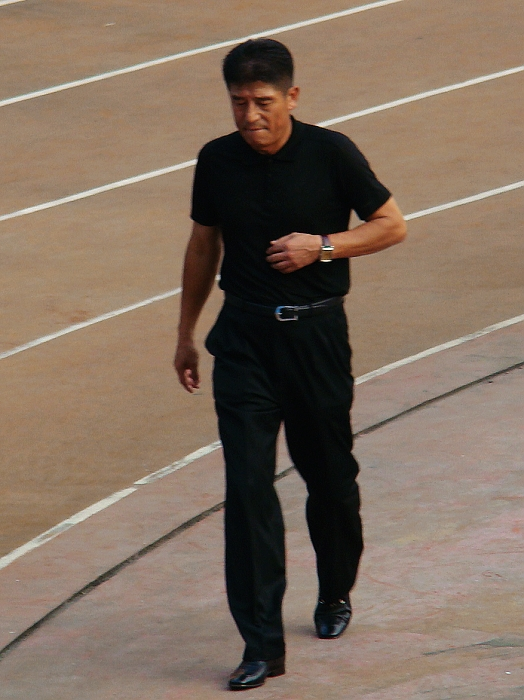

Personal information
- Date of birth: October 15, 1956 (age 70)
- Place of birth: Haman, Gyeongnam, South Korea
- Position: Defender

Team information
- Current team: Khonkaen Mordindang (technical director)

Youth career
- 1976–1979: Yonsei University

Senior career*
Years	Team	Apps	(Gls)
1980–1981	Saehan Motors / Daewoo (Semi-professional)		
1981–1983	Sangmu FC (Military service)		
1983–1986	Yukong Elephants	53	(8)

International career
1978	South Korea B		
1979–1980	South Korea	10	(1)

Managerial career
- 1987: Honam University (Coach)
- 1988–1991: Ilhwa Chunma (Junior Coach)
- 1992–1995: Ilhwa Chunma (Coach)
- 1996: Cheonan Ilhwa Chunma
- 1998–2001: Chongqing Lifan
- 2001–2003: Qingdao Etsone Hainiu
- 2003–2004: Chunnam Dragons
- 2005–2006: FC Seoul
- 2007–2009: Beijing Guoan
- 2010–2012: Guangzhou Evergrande
- 2014: Chengdu Tiancheng
- 2016–2017: Changchun Yatai
- 2022: Shenzhen FC
- 2025–: Khonkaen Mordindang (technical director)
Korean name
Hangul	이장수
Hanja	李章洙
RR	I Jangsu
MR	I Changsu
- * Club domestic league appearances and goals

Lee Jang-soo (Korean: 이장수; born October 15, 1956) is a South Korean association football manager and a former player. he is the current technical director of Thai League 3 club Khonkaen Mordindang. As a player, he had the distinction of being one of the first fully professional footballers to play in the newly formed Korean Super League in the inaugural 1983 league season, however it has been as a manager where he has distinguished himself particularly within China where he has gone on to twice win the Chinese FA Cup with Chongqing Lifan and Qingdao Beilaite. He has also achieved a successful spell back home within South Korea with FC Seoul when he won the K-League Cup, however he has continued to return to China where he was the manager of Chinese club Guangzhou Evergrande whose appointment also makes him the longest serving foreign coach within Chinese football.

== Playing career ==
Lee Jang-soo was one of the first players to play professional football in South Korea when he started his professional football career at Yukong Elephants in 1983 with the formation of the K-League. Despite already being in his late twenties he would eventually play in 53 league games in his professional career which ended in 1986.

== Coaching career ==
After his football career he became a coach at Honam University before being offered the chance to become a trainer with the newly formed Ilhwa Chunma team in the K-League. He was offered a promotion as a coaching in 1992 where he was part of the team that took them second in the league. The next few seasons saw him as part of the coaching team that would establish Ilhwa Chunma as a successful team within the K-League by winning the league for three consecutive seasons. In the 1996 league season when Ilhwa Chunma decided to rename themselves as Cheonan Ilhwa Chunma, Lee Jang-soo was again promoted to the Head coach position after the previous manager Park Jong-hwan left, however after a disappointing season where they were never in the title challenge Lee Jang-soo left.

Throughout 1997 Lee Jang-soo went to Brazil to study coaching abroad until 1998 when Lee Jang-soo would move to China and manage Chongqing Lifan for four seasons. While he was there he managed to twice take Chongqing Lifan to fourth in the league in the 1999 and 2000 league season. However it wasn't until 2002 when Lee Jang-soo had moved to Qingdao Beilaite that he rose to prominace within China and won the Chinese FA Cup with them. The following season though Qingdao Beilaite were to have a disappointing season when they finished the league in eleventh and Lee Jang-soo would return to Korea. Back in South Korea Lee Jang-soo would quickly find a team to coach with Chunnam Dragons and subsequently FC Seoul where he led them both to a Championship playoffs spot.

At the beginning of the 2006 league season Lee Jang-soo returned to China with Beijing Guoan who required a manager after Shen Xiangfu left after a disappointing season. Under Lee Jang-soo, Beijing Guoan immediately improved by coming third in the league. Despite the team's continued improvement within the league and a successful start in the 2009 Chinese Super League season where the club were currently leading the table on September 16, 2009, Lee was fired by Beijing Guoan for not using particular players that were favored by the club directors.

On 25 March 2010, Lee was hired by Guangzhou Evergrande, who was newly relegated to China League One for match-fixing scandal, as the team's new manager. He led Guangzhou to finish first place in the 2010 League One season and won promotion back to the top flight at the first attempt. In his second season, Guangzhou Evergrande won the Super League title for the first time in the club's history. He also set the club's record for longest unbeaten streak in the league with 32 wins and 12 draws, which was ended on 18 September after losing to Changchun Yatai 2–1.

Lee achieved the Chinese FA Super Cup winner in 2012 for his third time to pursue this trophy. He led the team to beat Tianjin Teda 2–1 at Guangzhou University City Stadium. On 16 May 2012, after sealing a place in the 2012 AFC Champions League knockout stage for Guangzhou by beating Buriram United on the previous day, it was reported that Guangzhou Evergrande held several talks with Lee and announced Lee's dismissal within the club. On 17 May 2012, Guangzhou Evergrande officially announced Marcello Lippi replacing Lee as the new manager of club.

On 12 February 2022, Lee was appointed as the head coach of Chinese Super League club Shenzhen FC

On 1 September 2022, Lee was sacked by Shenzhen.

== Club career ==
- 1981 Daewoo - amateur
- 1981–1983 Sangmu - army
- 1983–1986 Yukong Elephants

== Honours ==
=== Managerial ===
Seongnam Ilhwa Chunma

- Asian Super Cup: 1996
- Afro-Asian Club Championship: 1996

Chongqing Lifan

- China FA Cup: 2000

Qingdao Hademen

- China FA Cup: 2002

FC Seoul

- League Cup: 2006

Guangzhou Evergrande

- China League One: 2010
- Chinese Super League: 2011
- Chinese FA Super Cup: 2012
