= 2014 Guangzhou Evergrande F.C. season =

Guangzhou Evergrande 2014
- Chairman: Liu Yongzhuo (to 26 February 2014); Kang Bing (26 February 2014 to 7 July 2014); Zhang Yong (from 7 July 2014)
- Manager: Marcello Lippi
- Stadium: Tianhe Stadium
- Super League: 1st
- FA Cup: 4th round
- FA Super Cup: Runners-up
- AFC Champions League: Quarterfinals
- Top goalscorer: League: Elkeson (28); All: Elkeson (34)
- Highest home attendance: 48,765 vs Beijing Guoan; 26 October 2014 (Super League)
- Lowest home attendance: 36,351 vs Shanghai SIPG; 30 April 2014 (Super League)
- Average home league attendance: league: 42,154 all: 41,379
Home colours	Away colours

The 2014 Guangzhou Evergrande season is the 61st year in Guangzhou Evergrande's existence and is its 47th season in the Chinese football league, also its 25th season in the top flight.

== Players ==
=== First team squad ===
Note: Flags indicate national team as defined under FIFA eligibility rules; some limited exceptions apply. Players may hold more than one non-FIFA nationality.

No.	Pos.	Nation	Player
1	GK	CHN	Fang Jingqi
2	MF	CHN	Liao Lisheng
3	DF	CHN	Mei Fang
4	DF	CHN	Zhao Peng
5	DF	CHN	Zhang Linpeng
6	DF	CHN	Feng Xiaoting
7	MF	CHN	Feng Junyan (vice captain)
8	MF	BRA	Renê Júnior
9	MF	BRA	Elkeson
10	MF	CHN	Zheng Zhi (captain)
11	FW	BRA	Muriqui
12	MF	CHN	Zheng Long
13	GK	CHN	Xu Guangliao
14	MF	CHN	Feng Renliang
15	GK	CHN	Dong Chunyu
16	MF	CHN	Huang Bowen
17	MF	CHN	Liu Jian
18	FW	CHN	Dong Xuesheng
19	GK	CHN	Zeng Cheng
20	MF	CHN	Yang Xin

No.	Pos.	Nation	Player
21	MF	CHN	Peng Xinli
22	GK	CHN	Li Shuai
23	FW	ITA	Alessandro Diamanti
24	DF	CHN	Liu Haidong
25	FW	CHN	Gan Tiancheng
26	MF	CHN	Yu Hanchao
27	FW	CHN	Wang Junhui
28	DF	KOR	Kim Young-gwon
29	FW	CHN	Gao Lin
30	FW	CHN	Yang Chaosheng
31	MF	CHN	Luo Jiacheng
32	DF	CHN	Sun Xiang
33	DF	CHN	Rong Hao
34	MF	CHN	Hu Weiwei
35	DF	CHN	Li Xuepeng
37	MF	CHN	Zhao Xuri
38	FW	ITA	Alberto Gilardino
39	MF	CHN	Tan Jiajun
40	DF	CHN	Hu Bowen

=== Reserve squad ===
Note: Flags indicate national team as defined under FIFA eligibility rules; some limited exceptions apply. Players may hold more than one non-FIFA nationality.

No.	Pos.	Nation	Player
42	GK	CHN	Zhao Tianci
43	GK	CHN	Ye Guochen
44	DF	CHN	Chen Jinchao
45	DF	CHN	Hu Bao
46	DF	CHN	Wang Zihang
47	DF	CHN	Huang Yabin
48	FW	CHN	Wang Yifeng
49	DF	CHN	Liu Ruicheng
50	MF	CHN	Li Zhongyi

No.	Pos.	Nation	Player
51	MF	CHN	Hu Weilun
52	DF	CHN	Guan Haojin
53	FW	CHN	Liang Xueming
55	MF	CHN	Ren Yiren
56	MF	CHN	Lin Zhikeng
57	MF	CHN	Hu Yangyang
58	DF	CHN	Wen Haojun
59	DF	CHN	Li Jianbin
60	MF	CHN	Qin Sheng

== Technical staff ==
Position	Staff
Head coach	(Italy) Marcello Lippi
Assistant coaches	(Italy) Narciso Pezzotti
Assistant coaches	(Italy) Massimiliano Maddaloni
Assistant coaches	(China) Li Tie
Goalkeeping coach	(Italy) Michelangelo Rampulla
Fitness coach	(Italy) Claudio Gaudino
Reserve team coach	(Italy) Fabrizio Del Rosso
Reserve team assistant coach	(China) Pang Li
Reserve team goalkeeping coach	(China) Chen Gang
Academy director / U-17 team coach	(Germany) Marco Pezzaiuoli (from 20 October 2014)
Medical adviser	(Italy) Enrico Castellacci
Team doctors / Physiotherapists	(Italy) Silvano Cotti
Team doctors / Physiotherapists	(China) Liu Shulai^{†} (to 29 September 2014)
Team doctors / Physiotherapists	(Germany) Georg Meyer (to 30 June 2014)
Scouts	(Italy) Franco Ceravolo (to 31 May 2014)
Scouts	(Italy) Andrea Innocenti (from 12 August 2014)

Last updated: August 2014
Source: Guangzhou Evergrande F.C. (in Chinese)

== Transfers ==
=== In ===
==== Winter ====
Squad number	Position	Player	Age	Moving from	Type	Transfer fee	Date	Source
40	DF	(China) Hu Bowen	19	(China) Shanghai Dongya	Transfer	¥1 million	November 2013	
	FW	(Brazil) Cléo	28	(Japan) Kashiwa Reysol	Loan return	N / A	28 November 2013	
8	MF	(Brazil) Renê Júnior	24	(Brazil) Tombense	Transfer	€5 million	24 December 2013	
21	MF	(China) Peng Xinli	22	(China) Chengdu Tiancheng	Loan return	N / A	31 December 2013	
59	DF	(China) Li Jianbin	24	(China) Shanghai Shenhua	Loan return	N / A	31 December 2013	
	DF	(Brazil) Paulão	27	(Brazil) Cruzeiro	Loan return	N / A	31 December 2013	
	MF	(Brazil) Renato Cajá	29	(Brazil) Vitória	Loan return	N / A	31 December 2013	
	DF	(China) Tu Dongxu	22	(China) Meizhou Kejia	Loan return	N / A	31 December 2013	
	MF	(China) Wang Rui	20	(China) Meixian Hakka	Loan return	N / A	31 December 2013	
	FW	(China) Ye Weichao	24	(China) Meizhou Kejia	Loan return	N / A	31 December 2013	
	DF	(China) Zhang Yujia	22	(China) Meizhou Kejia	Loan return	N / A	31 December 2013	
	MF	(China) Peng Shaoxiong	24	(China) Meizhou Kejia	Loan return	N / A	31 December 2013	
3	DF	(China) Mei Fang	24	(China) Wuhan Zall	Transfer	Free transfer (Free agent)	1 January 2014	
12	MF	(China) Zheng Long	25	(China) Qingdao Jonoon	Transfer	Free transfer (Free agent)	1 January 2014	
17	MF	(China) Liu Jian	29	(China) Qingdao Jonoon	Transfer	Free transfer (Free agent)	3 January 2014	
23	MF	(Italy) Alessandro Diamanti	30	(Italy) Bologna	Transfer	€6.9 million	7 February 2014	
18	FW	(China) Dong Xuesheng	24	(China) Dalian Aerbin	Transfer	Undisclosed	28 February 2014	

==== Summer ====
Squad number	Position	Player	Age	Moving from	Type	Transfer fee	Date	Source
	MF	(Brazil) Renato Cajá	29	(Turkey) Bursaspor	Loan return	N / A	1 June 2014	
26	MF	(China) Yu Hanchao	27	(China) Dalian Aerbin	Transfer	¥48 million	10 June 2014	
35	DF	(China) Li Xuepeng	25	(China) Dalian Aerbin	Transfer	¥48 million	10 June 2014	
15	GK	(China) Dong Chunyu	23	(China) Shenyang Zhongze	Loan return	N / A	July 2014	
38	FW	(Italy) Alberto Gilardino	32	(Italy) Genoa	Transfer	€5 million	11 July 2014	

=== Out ===
==== Winter ====
Squad number	Position	Player	Age	Moving to	Type	Transfer fee	Date	Source
	DF	(Brazil) Paulão	27	(Brazil) Internacional	Transfer	Undisclosed	20 December 2013	
15	MF	(Argentina) Darío Conca	30	(Brazil) Fluminense	Transfer	Free transfer (End of contract)	31 December 2013	
26	MF	(China) Li Bin	22	(China) Yinchuan Helanshan	Transfer	Undisclosed	February 2014	
38	DF	(China) Zhang Yujia	23	(China) Guizhou Zhicheng	Transfer	Undisclosed	February 2014	
	MF	(China) Peng Shaoxiong	24	(China) Meizhou Kejia	Transfer	Undisclosed	February 2014	
24	MF	(China) Shi Hongjun	22	(China) Meizhou Kejia	Transfer	Undisclosed	February 2014	
23	MF	(China) Li Zhilang	22	(China) Meizhou Kejia	Transfer	Undisclosed	February 2014	
1	GK	(China) Yang Jun	32	(China) Shenyang Zhongze	Transfer	Free transfer (End of contract)	7 February 2014	
	FW	(Brazil) Cléo	28		Released	Undisclosed	February 2014	

==== Summer ====
Squad number	Position	Player	Age	Moving to	Type	Transfer fee	Date	Source
60	MF	(China) Qin Sheng	27	Meizhou Kejia	Released		June 2014	
11	FW	(Brazil) Muriqui	28	(Qatar) Al Sadd	Transfer	$8 million	13 July 2014	
	MF	(Brazil) Renato Cajá	29	(Brazil) Ponte Preta	Transfer	Undisclosed	27 July 2014	
	DF	(China) Huang Jiaqiang	24	(China) Jiangxi Liansheng	Transfer	Undisclosed	28 July 2014	

=== Loan out ===
Squad number	Position	Player	Age	Loaned to	Start	End	Source
	FW	(China) Gao Zhilin	22–23	(China) Meizhou Kejia	28 February 2013	31 December 2014	
	DF	(China) Li Weixin	20	(China) Meizhou Hakka	9 January 2013	31 December 2014	
	MF	(China) Zhang Xingbo	19–20	(China) Taiyuan Zhongyou Jiayi	9 January 2013	31 December 2014	
	FW	(China) Ni Bo	24	(China) Shenyang Zhongze	January 2014	31 December 2014	
	DF	(China) Gong Liangxuan	20	(China) Chengdu Tiancheng	January 2014	31 December 2014	
	GK	(China) Dong Chunyu	22	(China) Shenyang Zhongze	29 January 2013	June 2014	
	FW	(China) Ye Weichao	24	(China) Guangdong Sunray Cave	January 2014	31 December 2014	
	FW	(China) Shewket Yalqun	20–21	(China) Qingdao Hainiu	January 2014	31 December 2014	
	MF	(Brazil) Renato Cajá	29	(Turkey) Bursaspor	13 January 2014	31 May 2014	
	DF	(China) Yi Teng	23	(China) Liaoning Whowin	10 February 2014	31 December 2014	
	MF	(China) Wang Rui	20	(China) Qingdao Hainiu	28 February 2014	31 December 2014	
	DF	(China) Zhang Hongnan	23	(China) Qingdao Hainiu	28 February 2014	31 December 2014	
	DF	(China) Tu Dongxu	22	(China) Guangdong Sunray Cave	28 February 2014	31 December 2014	
4	DF	(China) Zhao Peng	30	(China) Changchun Yatai	16 June 2014	31 December 2014	
14	MF	(China) Feng Renliang	26	(China) Changchun Yatai	16 June 2014	31 December 2014	
59	DF	(China) Li Jianbin	25	(China) Henan Jianye	25 June 2014	31 December 2014	
21	MF	(China) Peng Xinli	22	(China) Meizhou Kejia	12 July 2014	31 December 2014	
30	FW	(China) Yang Chaosheng	20–21	(China) Liaoning Whowin	July 2014	31 December 2014	
40	DF	(China) Hu Bowen	20	(China) Hangzhou Greentown	July 2014	31 December 2014	

== Pre-season and friendlies ==
=== Training matches ===
Date	Opponents	H / A	Result	Scorers
2014-01-28	(China) Guangdong Sunray Cave	H	4–2	Gao Lin, Muriqui (2), Zhang Linpeng
2014-02-09	(Romania) Oțelul Galați	N	1–1	Muriqui
2014-02-12	(Hungary) Videoton	N	1–5	Muriqui
2014-02-20	(China) Qingdao Hainiu	H	3–0	Elkeson, Zhao Xuri, Gao Lin
2014-03-01	China	H	1–5	Tan Jiajun
2014-03-05	(China) Hebei Zhongji	H	2–1	
2014-06-21	Hong Kong U-23	H	4–0	
2014-06-25	(China) Shenzhen Ruby	H	1–2	Diamanti

=== 2014 Marbella Cup ===
3 February 2014	Guangzhou Evergrande (China)	0 – 2	(Romania) Dinamo București	Marbella, Spain
16:00 UTC+1			Țucudean 1', 16'	Stadium: Marbella Football Center

6 February 2014	Guangzhou Evergrande (China)	4 – 2	(Bulgaria) Lokomotiv Plovdiv	Marbella, Spain
15:00 UTC+1	Rong Hao 15', 86'; Elkeson 30'; Gao Lin 76'		Belaïd 53'; Mendes 70'	Stadium: Marbella Football Center

=== Atlético Mineiro China Tour ===
28 June 2014	Guangzhou Evergrande (China)	3 – 4	(Brazil) Atlético Mineiro	Nanning, China PR
19:30 UTC+8	Elkeson 9', 37'; Huang Bowen 31'		André 27'; Tardelli 45', 52'; Maicosuel 54'	Stadium: Guangxi Sports Center; Referee: Tan Hai; Assistant referees: Alamusi, Zhong Yong; Fourth official: Wang Di

=== China-Germany International Football Challenge ===
6 July 2014	Guangzhou Evergrande (China)	6 – 2	(Germany) Hamburger SV	Guangzhou, China PR
20:00 UTC+8	Renê Júnior 10'; Elkeson 16', 47'; Diamanti 53'; Gao Lin 80', 90'		van der Vaart 28' (pen.); Arslan (yellow card) 43'; Rudņevs 52'; Stieber (yellow card) 89'	Stadium: Tianhe Stadium; Referee: Wang Di; Assistant referees: Alamusi, Zhong Yong; Fourth official: Jia Zhiliang

== Competitions ==
=== Overview ===
Competition	Started round	Final position / round	First match	Last match
Chinese FA Super Cup	—	Runners-up	16 February 2014	
Chinese Super League	—	1st	8 March 2014	2 November 2014
Chinese FA Cup	3rd round	4th round	15 July 2014	24 July 2014
AFC Champions League	Group stage	Quarter-finals	26 February 2014	27 August 2014

Updated to match played 2 November 2014
Source: Competitions

=== Competition record ===
As of 2 November 2014

Competition	Record							
Competition	G	W	D	L	GF	GA	GD	Win%
Super League	30	22	4	4	76	28	+48	73.33
FA Cup	2	1	0	1	2	2	+0	50.00
Champions League	10	5	1	4	17	12	+5	50.00
Super Cup	1	0	0	1	0	1	−1	0.00
Total	43	28	5	10	95	43	+52	65.12

=== Chinese Super League ===
==== League table ====
Pos	Team	Pld	W	D	L	GF	GA	GD	Pts	Qualification or relegation
1	Guangzhou Evergrande (C)	30	22	4	4	76	28	+48	70	Qualification to Champions League group stage
2	Beijing Guoan	30	21	4	5	50	25	+25	67	Qualification to Champions League play-off round
3	Guangzhou R&F	30	17	6	7	67	39	+28	57	Qualification to Champions League preliminary round 2
4	Shandong Luneng Taishan (Note: Shandong Luneng Taishan qualified for the 2015 AFC Champions League Group Stage from winning the 2014 Chinese FA Cup.)	30	12	12	6	41	29	+12	48 (Note: Shandong 3–3 Shanghai SIPG; Shanghai SIPG 0–0 Shandong)	Qualification to Champions League group stage
5	Shanghai Dongya	30	12	12	6	47	39	+8	48	

Source: Chinese Super League (in Chinese)
Rules for classification: 1st points; 2nd head-to-head points; 3rd head-to-head goal difference; 4th head-to-head goals scored; 5th reserve league points; 6th goal difference; 7th goals scored; 8th disciplinary points (1 point for each yellow card, 3 points for each red card).
(C) Champions

==== Results summary ====
Overall								Home						Away					
Pld	W	D	L	GF	GA	GD	Pts	W	D	L	GF	GA	GD	W	D	L	GF	GA	GD
30	22	4	4	76	28	+48	70	10	2	3	37	12	+25	12	2	1	39	16	+23

Last updated: 2 November 2014.
Source: Competitive Matches

==== Results by round ====
Round	1	2	3	4	5	6	7	8	9	10	11	12	13	14	15	16	17	18	19	20	21	22	23	24	25	26	27	28	29	30
Ground	H	H	H	A	H	A	H	A	H	A	H	A	H	A	H	A	A	A	H	A	H	A	H	A	H	A	H	A	H	A
Result	W	W	L	W	W	W	W	W	W	W	L	W	D	D	D	W	W	L	W	W	W	W	W	W	W	W	W	W	L	D
Position	1	1	4	2	1	1	1	1	1	1	1	1	1	1	1	1	1	1	1	1	1	1	1	1	1	1	1	1	1	1

Updated to match(es) played on 2 November 2014. Source: Chinese Super League Table (in Chinese)
A = Away; H = Home; W = Win; D = Draw; L = Loss

==== Matches ====
Win Draw Loss

8 March 2014 Round 1	Guangzhou Evergrande	3 - 0	Henan Jianye	Guangzhou
16:35 UTC+8	Kim Young-gwon (yellow card) 20'; Zhang Linpeng (yellow card) 41'; Renê Júnior 53'; Feng Renliang 63'; Dong Xuesheng 71'	Match Report	Zhang Lu (yellow card) 60'; Lee Ji-Nam (yellow card) 65'	Stadium: Tianhe Stadium; Attendance: 45,800; Referee: Li Jun; Assistant referees: Ma Ji, Liu Guiqing; Fourth official: Fu Ming

15 March 2014 Round 2	Guangzhou Evergrande	4 - 1	Harbin Yiteng	Guangzhou
20:00 UTC+8	Renê Júnior 44'; Gao Lin 69'; Gao Lin (yellow card) 70'; Huang Bowen 80'; Diamanti 87'	Match Report	Liu Xiaolong (yellow card) 27'; Dorielton (yellow card) 27'; Han Deming 45'; Shao Shuai (yellow card) 50'; Dorielton (yellow card) 71' (yellow-red card)	Stadium: Tianhe Stadium; Attendance: 43,684; Referee: Guo Baolong; Assistant referees: Han Wei, Tong Yong; Fourth official: Tang Kun

23 March 2014 Round 3	Guangzhou Evergrande	1 - 3	Changchun Yatai	Guangzhou
20:00 UTC+8	Kim Young-gwon (yellow card) 51'; Elkeson 59' (pen.); Zheng Zhi (yellow card) 74'	Match Report	Liu Weidong (yellow card) 20'; Pei Shuai (yellow card) 23'; Bećiraj 36'; Iglesias 40'; Eninho 50'; Wang Wanpeng (yellow card) 56'; Ismailov (yellow card) 76'; Song Zhenyu (yellow card) 78'	Stadium: Tianhe Stadium; Attendance: 42,894; Referee: Ai Kun; Assistant referees: Wu Sining, Shi Xiang; Fourth official: Xia Jun

28 March 2014 Round 4	Jiangsu Sainty	0 - 2	Guangzhou Evergrande	Nanjing
19:35 UTC+8	Li Ang (yellow card) 47'	Match Report	Elkeson 26'; Kim Young-gwon (yellow card) 39'; Renê Júnior 43'; Diamanti (yellow card) 80'; Zhang Linpeng (yellow card) 82'	Stadium: Nanjing Olympic Sports Centre; Attendance: 52,117; Referee: Guo Baolong; Assistant referees: Han Wei, Tong Yong; Fourth official: Fan Qi

6 April 2014 Round 5	Guangzhou Evergrande	4 - 2	Dalian Aerbin	Guangzhou
20:00 UTC+8	Kim Young-gwon 12'; Elkeson 33'; Dong Xuesheng 79'; Elkeson (yellow card) 89'; Elkeson 90+3'	Match Report	Yu Hanchao 3'; Li Xuepeng (yellow card) 5'; Yu Hanchao 69'; Lü Peng (yellow card) 74'	Stadium: Tianhe Stadium; Attendance: 36,541; Referee: Tan Hai; Assistant referees: Zhang Qiangjing, Xu Jun; Fourth official: Xu Hang

11 April 2014 Round 6	Tianjin Teda	2 - 5	Guangzhou Evergrande	Tianjin
19:35 UTC+8	Lü Wei (yellow card) 12'; Wang Xinxin 17'; Zhou Haibin 51'; Li Weifeng (red card) 58'	Match Report	Dong Xuesheng 5'; Gao Lin 30'; Zhao Xuri (yellow card) 36'; Rong Hao 55'; Elkeson 60' (pen.); Gao Lin 68'	Stadium: Tianjin Olympic Center Stadium; Attendance: 28,866; Referee: Guo Baolong; Assistant referees: Yu Yue, Cao Yi; Fourth official: Zhang Lei

19 April 2014 Round 7	Guangzhou Evergrande	2 - 1	Shanghai Greenland	Guangzhou
20:00 UTC+8	Feng Junyan 41'; Gao Lin 52'; Liu Jian (yellow card) 59'	Match Report	Al-Khatib 82' (pen.)	Stadium: Tianhe Stadium; Attendance: 41,500; Referee: Fan Qi; Assistant referees: Han Wei, Tong Yong; Fourth official: Ma Li

26 May 2014 Round 8	Liaoning Whowin	0 - 4	Guangzhou Evergrande	Panjin
15:35 UTC+8	Zhang Ye (yellow card) 68'; Sun Shilin (yellow card) 81'; Hu Yanqiang (yellow card) 82'	Match Report	Dong Xuesheng 18'; Muriqui 31'; Celeski 72' (o.g.); Mei Fang (yellow card) 78'; Elkeson 89'	Stadium: Liaoning Panjin Stadium; Attendance: 25,371; Referee: Xu Han; Assistant referees: Yu Yue, Cao Yi; Fourth official: Ma Li

30 April 2014 Round 9	Guangzhou Evergrande	5 - 0	Shanghai SIPG	Guangzhou
20:00 UTC+8	Elkeson 34'; Muriqui 50'; Zhao Xuri (yellow card) 56'; Zhao Xuri 63'; Kim Young-gwon (yellow card) 75'; Renê Júnior 80'; Elkeson 90+3'	Match Report	Fu Huan (yellow card) 42'; Fu Huan (yellow card) 88' (yellow-red card)	Stadium: Tianhe Stadium; Attendance: 36,351; Referee: Ma Ning; Assistant referees: Ma Ji, Han Wei; Fourth official: He Xiaohu

3 May 2014 Round 10	Shanghai Shenxin	0 - 1	Guangzhou Evergrande	Shanghai
19:45 UTC+8	Xu Wen (yellow card) 85'; Ge Zhen (yellow card) 90'	Match Report	Renê Júnior (yellow card) 53'; Mei Fang (yellow card) 58'; Dong Xuesheng 60'; Zhang Linpeng (yellow card) 67'	Stadium: Jinshan Sports Centre; Attendance: 15,669; Referee: Zhang Lei; Assistant referees: Wu Sining, Song Xiangyun; Fourth official: Tan Hai

9 May 2014 Round 11	Guangzhou Evergrande	0 - 1	Guangzhou R&F	Guangzhou
20:00 UTC+8	Elkeson (penalty missed) 13' (pen.); Zhang Linpeng (yellow card) 20'; Muriqui (yellow card) 66'; Gao Lin (yellow card) 76'	Match Report	Chang Feiya (yellow card) 12'; Hamdallah 60'; Ilsø (yellow card) 86'	Stadium: Tianhe Stadium; Attendance: 43,471; Referee: Fan Qi; Assistant referees: Huo Weiming, Ma Ji; Fourth official: Zhao Zhizhi

18 May 2014 Round 12	Hangzhou Greentown	1 - 4	Guangzhou Evergrande	Hangzhou
19:35 UTC+8	Anselmo Ramon 55'	Match Report	Renê Júnior 6'; Elkeson 22'; Elkeson 81'; Elkeson 89'	Stadium: Yellow Dragon Sports Center; Attendance: 30,756; Referee: Zhang Lei; Assistant referees: Zhang Yongjun, Xu Jun; Fourth official: He Xiaohu

21 May 2014 Round 13	Guangzhou Evergrande	1 - 1	Guizhou Moutai	Guangzhou
20:00 UTC+8	Mei Fang (yellow card) 19'; Mei Fang 57'; Liu Jian (yellow card) 68'	Match Report	Chen Zijie 39'; Rao Weihui (yellow card) 45+1'; Hyuri (yellow card) 59'; Sun Jihai (yellow card) 75'; Mączyński (yellow card) 86'	Stadium: Tianhe Stadium; Attendance: 42,654; Referee: Zhou Gang; Assistant referees: Huo Weiming, Zhang Yongjun; Fourth official: Xia Jun

26 May 2014 Round 14	Beijing Guoan	1 - 1	Guangzhou Evergrande	Beijing
19:35 UTC+8	Zhang Xizhe 5'; Zhang Xizhe (yellow card) 79'; Xu Yunlong (yellow card) 86'; Matić (yellow card) 90+4'	Match Report	Elkeson 40'; Zheng Zhi (yellow card) 63'	Stadium: Workers Stadium; Attendance: 52,301; Referee: Li Jun; Assistant referees: Wu Sining, Tong Yong; Fourth official: Wang Jin

10 July 2014 Round 22	Shanghai Greenland	1 - 2	Guangzhou Evergrande	Shanghai
19:45 UTC+8	Gao Di 27'; Moreno (yellow card) 80'; Wang Shouting (yellow card) 90'		Diamanti 9'; Huang Bowen (yellow card) 29'; Mei Fang (yellow card) 71'; Zhao Xuri (yellow card) 78'; Rong Hao 90+1'	Stadium: Hongkou Football Stadium; Attendance: 17,235; Referee: Fu Ming; Assistant referees: Wang Dexin, Yang Li; Fourth official: Li Haihe

20 July 2014 Round 15	Guangzhou Evergrande	0 - 0	Shandong Luneng Taishan	Guangzhou
20:00 UTC+8	Renê Júnior (yellow card) 31'; Zhang Linpeng (yellow card) 41'		Jin Jingdao (yellow card) 35'; McGowan (yellow card) 39'; Love (penalty missed) 42' (pen.); Dai Lin (yellow card) 78'; Wang Dalei (yellow card) 84'	Stadium: Tianhe Stadium; Attendance: 48,413; Referee: Ma Ning; Assistant referees: Yu Yue, Cao Yi; Fourth official: Fu Ming

27 July 2014 Round 16	Henan Jianye	0 - 1	Guangzhou Evergrande	Zhengzhou
20:00 UTC+8			Liu Jian (yellow card) 61'; Elkeson 74'; Sun Xiang (yellow card) 89'	Stadium: Hanghai Stadium; Attendance: 21,528; Referee: Wang Di; Assistant referees: Zhang Yongjun, Xu Jun; Fourth official: Wang Jin

30 July 2014 Round 17	Harbin Yiteng	3 - 6	Guangzhou Evergrande	Harbin
20:00 UTC+8	Choi Hyun-yeon (yellow card) 23'; Hughes (yellow card) 38'; Steer 51'; Dorielton 73'; Steer 83'		Elkeson 3'; Gao Lin 9'; Steer 15' (o.g.); Gao Lin 54'; Zheng Zhi (yellow card) 75'; Renê Júnior 80'; Zhang Linpeng (yellow card) 84'; Elkeson 89' (pen.)	Stadium: Harbin Sports City Center Stadium; Attendance: 40,678; Referee: Xia Jun; Assistant referees: Zhan Wei, Xu Jun; Fourth official: Wang Di

3 August 2014 Round 18	Changchun Yatai	2 - 1	Guangzhou Evergrande	Changchun
19:30 UTC+8	Eninho 3'; Yang Xu (yellow card) 58'; Huszti 81'; Li Xiaoting (yellow card) 83'		Gilardino 32'; Sun Xiang (yellow card) 81'	Stadium: Development Area Stadium; Attendance: 26,187; Referee: Huang Yejun; Assistant referees: Zhang Qiangjin, Han Wei; Fourth official: Wang Di

9 August 2014 Round 19	Guangzhou Evergrande	3 - 0	Jiangsu Sainty	Guangzhou
20:00 UTC+8	Huang Bowen (yellow card) 10'; Elkeson 68' (pen.); Zheng Zhi (yellow card) 77'; Zhao Xuri 88'; Elkeson 90'		Tao Yuan (yellow card) 58'; Ren Hang (yellow card) 69'; Yoon Sin-young (yellow card) 80'; Li Ang (yellow card) 83'	Stadium: Tianhe Stadium; Attendance: 42,314; Referee: Wang Di; Assistant referees: Xu Jun, Zhan Wei; Fourth official: Zhang Lei

13 August 2014 Round 20	Dalian Aerbin	1 - 2	Guangzhou Evergrande	Dalian
19:00 UTC+8	Bruno 64'; Jin Pengxiang (yellow card) 68'		Mei Fang (yellow card) 30'; Gilardino 57'; Gilardino 80'; Rong Hao (yellow card) 85'	Stadium: Dalian Sports Center; Attendance: 18,921; Referee: Ma Li; Assistant referees: Liu Guiqing, Shao Honggeng; Fourth official: Xu Fuxin

16 August 2014 Round 21	Guangzhou Evergrande	2 - 1	Tianjin Teda	Guangzhou
20:00 UTC+8	Rong Hao (yellow card) 23'; Kim Young-gwon (yellow card) 40'; Yu Hanchao 58'; Zhang Linpeng (yellow card) 61'; Liu Jian 90+4'		Wang Xinxin (yellow card) 11'; Ali Khan (yellow card) 28'; Valencia 56'; Éder Lima (yellow card) 78'	Stadium: Tianhe Stadium; Attendance: 41,326; Referee: Li Jun; Assistant referees: Song Xiangyun, Yu Yue; Fourth official: He Xiaohu

31 August 2014 Round 23	Guangzhou Evergrande	6 - 0	Liaoning Whowin	Guangzhou
20:00 UTC+8	Elkeson 24'; Diamanti 45+3'; Elkeson 48'; Renê Júnior 50'; Gilardino 60'; Zhang Linpeng (yellow card) 77'; Elkeson 82'		Chamanga (yellow card) 27'; Zheng Tao (yellow card) 62'; Yi Teng (yellow card) 80'	Stadium: Tianhe Stadium; Attendance: 36,413; Referee: Shi Zhenlu; Assistant referees: Zhan Wei, Zhang Yongjun; Fourth official: Ma Ning

13 September 2014 Round 24	Shanghai SIPG	0 - 3	Guangzhou Evergrande	Shanghai
19:45 UTC+8			Gao Lin 7'; Elkeson 69'; Elkeson 77'	Stadium: Shanghai Stadium; Attendance: 20,691; Referee: Wang Jin; Assistant referees: Song Xiangyun, Shi Xiang; Fourth official: Li Haihe

20 September 2014 Round 25	Guangzhou Evergrande	2 - 1	Shanghai Shenxin	Guangzhou
20:00 UTC+8	Gao Lin 81'; Yu Hanchao 90+5'		Jaílton Paraíba (yellow card) 19'; Sun Kai (yellow card) 23'; Jiang Jiajun (yellow card) 44'; Everton 63'; Jaílton Paraíba (yellow card) 75' (yellow-red card); Lim You-hwan (yellow card) 89'; Johnny (yellow card) 90+6'	Stadium: Tianhe Stadium; Attendance: 39,841; Referee: Xia Jun; Assistant referees: Wang Dexin, Shi Xiang; Fourth official: He Xiaohu

28 September 2014 Round 26	Guangzhou R&F	3 - 4	Guangzhou Evergrande	Guangzhou
19:30 UTC+8	Park Jong-woo (yellow card) 18'; Davi (yellow card) 24'; Jiang Zhipeng (yellow card) 33'; Lu Lin 64'; Jiang Ning 77'; Hamdallah 80'		Kim Young-gwon (yellow card) 11'; Gilardino 26'; Elkeson 31'; Elkeson 35'; Zheng Zhi (yellow card) 69'; Gao Lin (yellow card) 73'; Renê Júnior 90'	Stadium: Yuexiushan Stadium; Attendance: 18,873; Referee: Wang Jin; Assistant referees: Wang Dexin, Zhang Jun; Fourth official: Tang Kun

5 October 2014 Round 27	Guangzhou Evergrande	4 - 0	Hangzhou Greentown	Guangzhou
20:00 UTC+8	Yu Hanchao 11'; Elkeson 56'; Elkeson 68' (pen.); Diamanti (yellow card) 83'; Diamanti 90+1'		Wang Lin (yellow card) 40'; Wu Wei (red card) 67'	Stadium: Tianhe Stadium; Attendance: 42,347; Referee: Shi Zhenlu; Assistant referees: Shi Xiang, Zhou Guangya; Fourth official: Chen Gang

18 October 2014 Round 28	Guizhou Moutai	1 - 2	Guangzhou Evergrande	Guiyang
16:00 UTC+8	Chen Jie 24'; Hyuri (yellow card) 27'; Sun Jihai (yellow card) 75'; Misimović (yellow card) 90+1'; Sun Jihai (yellow card) 90+3' (yellow-red card)		Renê Júnior (yellow card) 28'; Zhang Linpeng 43'; Diamanti (yellow card) 78'; Elkeson 80'; Zheng Zhi (yellow card) 90+1'	Stadium: Guiyang Olympic Sports Center; Attendance: 25,491; Referee: Ma Ning; Assistant referees: Cao Yi, Yu Yue; Fourth official: He Xiaohu

26 October 2014 Round 29	Guangzhou Evergrande	0 - 1	Beijing Guoan	Guangzhou
15:35 UTC+8	Zheng Zhi (yellow card) 8'; Sun Xiang (yellow card) 28'; Elkeson (yellow card) 42'; Sun Xiang (yellow card) 52' (yellow-red card); Li Xuepeng (yellow card) 79'		Batalla (yellow card) 35'; Zhao Hejing (yellow card) 66'; Zhang Xizhe (yellow card) 69'; Zhou Ting (yellow card) 75'; Zhang Chengdong (yellow card) 78'; Shao Jiayi 88'	Stadium: Tianhe Stadium; Attendance: 48,765; Referee: Yoshiro Imamura (Japan); Assistant referees: Zhan Wei, Zhang Qiangjing; Fourth official: Tang Kun

2 November 2014 Round 30	Shandong Luneng Taishan	1 - 1	Guangzhou Evergrande	Jinan
15:35 UTC+8	Liu Binbin 12'; Zhang Chi (yellow card) 22'		Elkeson 43'; Mei Fang (yellow card) 47'; Zhao Xuri (yellow card) 89'; Renê Júnior (yellow card) 90+2'	Stadium: Jinan Olympic Sports Center Stadium; Attendance: 42,936; Referee: Hiroyuki Kimura (Japan); Assistant referees: Wang Dexin, Han Wei; Fourth official: Zhou Gang

=== Chinese FA Cup ===
15 July 2014 Third round	Guangzhou Evergrande	1 - 0	Guangdong Sunray Cave	Guangzhou
20:00 UTC+8	Yu Hanchao 68'; Diamanti (yellow card) 90+2'			Stadium: Tianhe Sports Center; Attendance: 37,641; Referee: Wang Jing; Assistant referees: Zhang Qiangjin, Li Zhihong; Fourth official: Pang Wenbin

24 July 2014 Fourth round	Henan Jianye	2 - 1	Guangzhou Evergrande	Zhengzhou
20:00 UTC+8	Huang Xiyang (yellow card) 45'; Xiao Zhi 75'; Xiao Zhi (yellow card) 80'; Xiao Zhi 89'		Feng Junyan (yellow card) 15'; Gilardino 23'; Feng Xiaoting (yellow card) 39'; Diamanti (yellow card) 45'; Zhang Linpeng (yellow card) 90+3'	Stadium: Hanghai Stadium; Attendance: 17,357; Referee: Guo Hao; Assistant referees: Mu Yuxin, Song Xiangyun; Fourth official: Yang Nan

=== Chinese FA Super Cup ===
16 February 2014	Guizhou Moutai	1 - 0	Guangzhou Evergrande	Guiyang
14:00 UTC+8	Muslimović 35'; Xavier Chen (yellow card) 70'; Chen Zijie (yellow card) 84'		Hu Weiwei (yellow card) 43'; Li Jianbin (yellow card) 84'	Stadium: Guiyang Olympic Sports Center; Attendance: 13,178; Referee: Tan Hai; Assistant referees: Huo Weiming, Mu Yuxin; Fourth official: Fan Qi

=== AFC Champions League ===
==== Group stage ====
Group G
Team	Pld	W	D	L	GF	GA	GD	Pts
(China) Guangzhou Evergrande	6	3	1	2	10	8	+2	10
(South Korea) Jeonbuk Hyundai Motors	6	2	2	2	8	7	+1	8
(Australia) Melbourne Victory	6	2	2	2	9	9	0	8
(Japan) Yokohama F. Marinos	6	2	1	3	7	10	−3	7

26 February 2014 Group G	Guangzhou Evergrande (China)	4 - 2	(Australia) Melbourne Victory	Guangzhou, China PR
20:00 UTC+8	Gao Lin (yellow card) 48'; Huang Bowen 59'; Diamanti 65'; Elkeson 71'; Diamanti 85'	Summary; Report	Contreras 37'; Broxham 41'; Makarounas (yellow card) 63'; Contreras (yellow card) 87'; Traoré (yellow card) 90+2'	Stadium: Tianhe Stadium; Attendance: 39,841; Referee: Abdulrahman Abdou (Qatar); Assistant referees: Taleb Al-Marri (Qatar), Mohamed Alhammadi (United Arab Emirates); Fourth official: Khamis Al-Kuwari (Qatar)

12 March 2014 Group G	Yokohama F. Marinos (Japan)	1 - 1	(China) Guangzhou Evergrande	Yokohama, Japan
19:30 UTC+9	Hanato 21'	Summary; Report	Zheng Zhi (yellow card) 18'; Diamanti 38'; Kim Young-gwon (yellow card) 68'	Stadium: International Stadium Yokohama; Attendance: 12,230; Referee: Marai Mohammed A Alawaji (Saudi Arabia); Assistant referees: Badr Ali A Alshumrani (Saudi Arabia), Abdulah Mutlaq A AlshaLwai (Saudi Arabia); Fourth official: Saleh Abdullah M Alhethlol (Saudi Arabia)

18 March 2014 Group G	Guangzhou Evergrande (China)	3 - 1	(South Korea) Jeonbuk Hyundai Motors	Guangzhou, China PR
20:00 UTC+8	Gao Lin 17'; Gao Lin 21'; Liao Lisheng (yellow card) 57'; Liao Lisheng 61'	Summary; Report	Kim Nam-Il (yellow card) 23'; Lee Dong-Gook 39'	Stadium: Tianhe Stadium; Attendance: 39,987; Referee: Abdullah Al Hilali (Oman); Assistant referees: Hamed Sulaiman Al Mayahi (Oman), Saif Talib Saif Al Ghafri (Oman); Fourth official: Yaqoob Said Abdullah Abdul Baqi (Oman)

2 April 2014 Group G	Jeonbuk Hyundai Motors (South Korea)	1 - 0	(China) Guangzhou Evergrande	Jeonju, South Korea
19:00 UTC+9	Kim Kee-Hee (yellow card) 32'; Jeong Hyuk (yellow card) 44'; Jeong Hyuk (yellow card) 67' (yellow-red card); Leonardo 76'; Lee Kyu-Ro (yellow card) 88'	Summary; Report	Elkeson (yellow card) 29'; Mei Fang (yellow card) 45+2'; Diamanti (yellow card) 64'; Gao Lin (yellow card) 78'; Muriqui (yellow card) 82'	Stadium: Jeonju World Cup Stadium; Attendance: 18,974; Referee: Mohd Amirul Izwan (Malaysia); Assistant referees: Mohd Sabri Bin Mat Daud (Malaysia), Mohd Yusri bin Muhamad (Malaysia); Fourth official: Suhaizi Bin Shukri (Malaysia)

15 April 2014 Group G	Melbourne Victory (Australia)	2 - 0	(China) Guangzhou Evergrande	Melbourne, Australia
19:30 UTC+10	Milligan 2'; Milligan (yellow card) 23'; Troisi 90+1'; Troisi (yellow card) 90+2'	Summary; Report	Zhang Linpeng (yellow card) 41'; Liao Lisheng (yellow card) 81'	Stadium: Docklands Stadium; Attendance: 13,120; Referee: Fahad Al-Mirdasi (Saudi Arabia); Assistant referees: Badr Ali A Alshumrani (Saudi Arabia), Nassir Mohammed A Al Mudhaffar (Saudi Arabia); Fourth official: Nagor Amir Noor Mohamed (Malaysia)

22 April 2014 Group G	Guangzhou Evergrande (China)	2 - 1	(Japan) Yokohama F. Marinos	Guangzhou, China PR
19:00 UTC+8	Elkeson 11', 38'	Summary; Report	Saitō 85'	Stadium: Tianhe Stadium; Attendance: 39,874; Referee: Mohamed Al Zarouni (United Arab Emirates); Assistant referees: Mohamed Aljalaf (United Arab Emirates), Zayed Dawood Salman Kamal (United Arab Emirates); Fourth official: Mohd Nafeez Bin Abdul Wahab (Malaysia)

==== Knockout stage ====
===== Round of 16 =====
6 May 2014 1st leg	Cerezo Osaka (Japan)	1 - 5	(China) Guangzhou Evergrande	Osaka, Japan
19:00 UTC+9	Hasegawa 30'; Someya (yellow card) 33'; Kačar (yellow card) 71'	Summary; Report	Kim Young-gwon (yellow card) 17'; Muriqui 22'; Elkeson 34' (pen.); Elkeson 37'; Zheng Zhi (yellow card) 60'; Gao Lin 78'; Muriqui 84'; Rong Hao (yellow card) 87'	Stadium: Nagai Stadium; Attendance: 17,612; Referee: Muhammad Taqi Al-Jaafari Bin Jahari (Singapore); Assistant referees: Li Ziliang (Singapore), Jeffrey Goh (Singapore); Fourth official: Sukhbir Singh (Singapore)

13 May 2014 2nd leg	Guangzhou Evergrande (China)	0 - 1 (5 - 2 agg.)	(Japan) Cerezo Osaka	Guangzhou, China PR
20:00 UTC+8	Zheng Zhi (yellow card) 28'	Summary; Report	Liao Lisheng 49' (o.g.)	Stadium: Tianhe Stadium; Attendance: 38,431; Referee: Alireza Faghani (Iran); Assistant referees: Hassan Kamranifar (Iran), Reza Sokhandan (Iran); Fourth official: Ashkan Khorshidi (Iran)

===== Quarter-finals =====
20 August 2014 1st leg	Western Sydney Wanderers (Australia)	1 - 0	(China) Guangzhou Evergrande	Sydney, Australia
19:30 UTC+10	Hamill (yellow card) 8'; Juric 60'; Alessi (yellow card) 65'; Saba (yellow card) 86'; La Rocca (yellow card) 90'; Juric (yellow card) 90+2'	Summary; Report	Feng Xiaoting (yellow card) 62'; Kim Young-gwon (yellow card) 67'; Zhang Linpeng (red card) 89'; Gao Lin (red card) 90+1'	Stadium: Parramatta Stadium; Attendance: 17,093; Referee: Abdulla Hassan Mohamed (United Arab Emirates); Assistant referees: Mohamed Al Hammadi (United Arab Emirates), Hasan Al Mahri (United Arab Emirates); Fourth official: Mohd Amirul Izwan bin Yaacob (Malaysia)

27 August 2014 2nd leg	Guangzhou Evergrande (China)	2 - 1 (2 - 2a agg.)	(Australia) Western Sydney Wanderers	Guangzhou, China PR
20:00 UTC+8	Elkeson (penalty missed) 33' (pen.); Diamanti (yellow card) 53'; Zeng Cheng (yellow card) 58'; Diamanti 61'; Elkeson 90+1'	Summary; Report	Bridge (yellow card) 38'; Cole (yellow card) 56'; Juric 58' (pen.); Juric (yellow card) 59'; Šantalab (yellow card) 85'	Stadium: Tianhe Stadium; Attendance: 39,874; Referee: Ryuji Sato (Japan); Assistant referees: Sagara Toru (Japan), Igarashi Hiroyuki (Japan); Fourth official: Minoru Tōjō (Japan)

== Statistics ==
As of 2 November 2014

=== Appearances and goals ===
No.	Pos.	Player	Super League			FA Cup			Champions League			Super Cup			Total		
No.	Pos.	Player	Apps.	Starts	Goals	Apps.	Starts	Goals	Apps.	Starts	Goals	Apps.	Starts	Goals	Apps.	Starts	Goals
1	GK	(China) Fang Jingqi	0	0	0	0	0	0	0	0	0	1	1	0	1	1	0
2	DF	(China) Liao Lisheng	17	11	0	2	2	0	9	7	1	0	0	0	28	20	1
3	DF	(China) Mei Fang	18	13	1	2	2	0	5	1	0	0	0	0	25	16	1
4	DF	(China) Zhao Peng	2	1	0	0	0	0	0	0	0	0	0	0	2	1	0
5	DF	(China) Zhang Linpeng	27	27	1	2	1	0	9	9	0	0	0	0	38	37	1
6	DF	(China) Feng Xiaoting	23	23	0	0	0	0	9	9	0	0	0	0	32	32	0
7	MF	(China) Feng Junyan	5	3	1	2	2	0	2	0	0	1	1	0	10	6	1
8	MF	(Brazil) Renê Júnior	26	24	8	0	0	0	0	0	0	0	0	0	26	24	8
9	FW	(Brazil) Elkeson	28	25	28	1	0	0	10	10	6	0	0	0	39	35	34
10	MF	(China) Zheng Zhi	20	17	0	0	0	0	8	8	0	0	0	0	28	25	0
11	FW	(Brazil) Muriqui	6	5	2	0	0	0	7	6	2	0	0	0	13	11	4
14	MF	(China) Feng Renliang	2	1	1	0	0	0	1	0	0	0	0	0	3	1	1
16	MF	(China) Huang Bowen	27	20	1	1	0	0	10	7	1	0	0	0	38	27	2
17	MF	(China) Liu Jian	14	9	1	2	2	0	2	1	0	0	0	0	18	12	1
18	FW	(China) Dong Xuesheng	9	6	5	2	2	0	1	0	0	0	0	0	12	8	5
19	GK	(China) Zeng Cheng	26	26	0	0	0	0	10	10	0	0	0	0	36	36	0
20	MF	(China) Yang Xin	0	0	0	0	0	0	0	0	0	1	1	0	1	1	0
22	GK	(China) Li Shuai	4	4	0	2	2	0	0	0	0	0	0	0	6	6	0
23	MF	(Italy) Alessandro Diamanti	24	14	4	2	1	0	9	8	4	0	0	0	35	23	8
24	DF	(China) Liu Haidong	2	1	0	1	1	0	0	0	0	1	1	0	4	3	0
25	MF	(China) Gan Tiancheng	0	0	0	0	0	0	0	0	0	1	0	0	1	0	0
26	MF	(China) Yu Hanchao	11	3	3	2	1	1	2	0	0	0	0	0	15	4	4
27	FW	(China) Wang Junhui	0	0	0	0	0	0	0	0	0	1	0	0	1	0	0
28	DF	(South Korea) Kim Young-gwon	16	15	1	0	0	0	9	9	0	0	0	0	25	24	1
29	FW	(China) Gao Lin	28	25	8	2	1	0	8	5	3	0	0	0	38	31	11
30	FW	(China) Yang Chaosheng	0	0	0	0	0	0	0	0	0	1	1	0	1	1	0
31	MF	(China) Luo Jiacheng	0	0	0	0	0	0	0	0	0	1	1	0	1	1	0
32	DF	(China) Sun Xiang	23	20	0	0	0	0	10	10	0	0	0	0	33	30	0
33	DF	(China) Rong Hao	18	12	2	2	2	0	7	2	0	0	0	0	27	16	2
34	DF	(China) Hu Weiwei	0	0	0	0	0	0	0	0	0	1	1	0	1	1	0
35	DF	(China) Li Xuepeng	6	4	0	0	0	0	1	1	0	0	0	0	7	5	0
36	MF	(China) Hu Yangyang	0	0	0	0	0	0	0	0	0	1	1	0	1	1	0
37	MF	(China) Zhao Xuri	21	9	2	2	2	0	6	5	0	0	0	0	29	16	2
38	FW	(Italy) Alberto Gilardino	14	12	5	1	1	1	2	2	0	0	0	0	17	15	6
39	MF	(China) Tan Jiajun	0	0	0	0	0	0	0	0	0	1	1	0	1	1	0
59	DF	(China) Li Jianbin	0	0	0	0	0	0	0	0	0	1	1	0	1	1	0
60	MF	(China) Qin Sheng	0	0	0	0	0	0	0	0	0	1	1	0	1	1	0
Own Goals					2												2
TOTALS					76			2			17			0			95

=== Goalscorers ===
Rank	Player	No.	Pos.	Super League	FA Cup	Champions League	Super Cup	Total
1	(Brazil) Elkeson	9	FW	28	0	6	0	34
2	(China) Gao Lin	29	FW	8	0	3	0	11
3	(Brazil) Renê Júnior	8	MF	8	0	0	0	8
3	(Italy) Alessandro Diamanti	23	MF	4	0	4	0	8
5	(Italy) Alberto Gilardino	38	FW	5	1	0	0	6
6	(China) Dong Xuesheng	18	FW	5	0	0	0	5
7	(Brazil) Muriqui	11	FW	2	0	2	0	4
7	(China) Yu Hanchao	26	MF	3	1	0	0	4
9	(China) Huang Bowen	16	MF	1	0	1	0	2
9	(China) Rong Hao	33	DF	2	0	0	0	2
9	(China) Zhao Xuri	37	MF	2	0	0	0	2
12	(China) Liao Lisheng	2	MF	0	0	1	0	1
12	(China) Mei Fang	3	DF	1	0	0	0	1
12	(China) Zhang Linpeng	5	DF	1	0	0	0	1
12	(China) Feng Junyan	7	MF	1	0	0	0	1
12	(China) Feng Renliang	14	MF	1	0	0	0	1
12	(China) Liu Jian	17	MF	1	0	0	0	1
12	(South Korea) Kim Young-gwon	28	DF	1	0	0	0	1
Own Goals				2	0	0	0	2
TOTALS				76	2	17	0	95

=== Assists ===
Rank	Player	No.	Pos.	Super League	FA Cup	Champions League	Super Cup	Total
1	(China) Gao Lin	29	FW	10	1	2	0	13
2	(Italy) Alessandro Diamanti	23	MF	5	1	3	0	9
3	(China) Zhang Linpeng	5	DF	6	0	2	0	8
5	(Brazil) Elkeson	9	FW	6	0	0	0	6
5	(Brazil) Muriqui	11	FW	4	0	2	0	6
6	(China) Liao Lisheng	2	MF	2	0	2	0	4
6	(China) Huang Bowen	16	MF	3	0	1	0	4
6	(Italy) Alberto Gilardino	38	FW	3	0	1	0	4
9	(Brazil) Renê Júnior	8	MF	3	0	0	0	3
9	(China) Yu Hanchao	26	MF	3	0	0	0	3
9	(China) Sun Xiang	32	DF	2	0	1	0	3
9	(China) Zhao Xuri	37	MF	3	0	0	0	3
13	(China) Zheng Zhi	10	MF	2	0	0	0	2
13	(China) Rong Hao	33	DF	2	0	0	0	2
15	(China) Mei Fang	3	DF	1	0	0	0	1
15	(China) Feng Xiaoting	6	DF	0	0	1	0	1
15	(China) Dong Xuesheng	18	FW	1	0	0	0	1
15	(South Korea) Kim Young-gwon	28	DF	1	0	0	0	1
Total				57	2	15	0	74

=== Clean sheets ===
Rank	Player	No.	Pos.	Super League	FA Cup	Champions League	Super Cup	Total
1	(China) Zeng Cheng	19	GK	9	0	0	0	9
2	(China) Li Shuai	22	GK	2	1	0	0	3
TOTALS				11	1	0	0	12

=== Disciplinary record ===
No.	Pos.	Player	Super League			FA Cup			Champions League			Super Cup			Total		
No.	Pos.	Player	Yellow card	(yellow card) (yellow-red card)	Red card	Yellow card	(yellow card) (yellow-red card)	Red card	Yellow card	(yellow card) (yellow-red card)	Red card	Yellow card	(yellow card) (yellow-red card)	Red card	Yellow card	(yellow card) (yellow-red card)	Red card
2	MF	(China) Liao Lisheng	0	0	0	0	0	0	2	0	0	0	0	0	2	0	0
3	DF	(China) Mei Fang	6	0	0	0	0	0	1	0	0	0	0	0	7	0	0
5	DF	(China) Zhang Linpeng	8	0	0	1	0	0	1	0	1	0	0	0	10	0	1
6	DF	(China) Feng Xiaoting	0	0	0	1	0	0	1	0	0	0	0	0	2	0	0
7	MF	(China) Feng Junyan	0	0	0	1	0	0	0	0	0	0	0	0	1	0	0
8	MF	(Brazil) Renê Júnior	4	0	0	0	0	0	0	0	0	0	0	0	4	0	0
9	FW	(Brazil) Elkeson	2	0	0	0	0	0	1	0	0	0	0	0	3	0	0
10	MF	(China) Zheng Zhi	7	0	0	0	0	0	3	0	0	0	0	0	10	0	0
11	FW	(Brazil) Muriqui	1	0	0	0	0	0	1	0	0	0	0	0	2	0	0
16	MF	(China) Huang Bowen	2	0	0	0	0	0	0	0	0	0	0	0	2	0	0
17	MF	(China) Liu Jian	3	0	0	0	0	0	0	0	0	0	0	0	3	0	0
19	GK	(China) Zeng Cheng	0	0	0	0	0	0	1	0	0	0	0	0	1	0	0
23	MF	(Italy) Alessandro Diamanti	3	0	0	2	0	0	2	0	0	0	0	0	7	0	0
26	DF	(China) Li Jianbin	0	0	0	0	0	0	0	0	0	1	0	0	1	0	0
28	DF	(South Korea) Kim Young-gwon	6	0	0	0	0	0	3	0	0	0	0	0	9	0	0
29	FW	(China) Gao Lin	3	0	0	0	0	0	2	0	1	0	0	0	5	0	1
32	DF	(China) Sun Xiang	4	1	0	0	0	0	0	0	0	0	0	0	4	1	0
33	DF	(China) Rong Hao	2	0	0	0	0	0	1	0	0	0	0	0	3	0	0
34	DF	(China) Hu Weiwei	0	0	0	0	0	0	0	0	0	1	0	0	1	0	0
35	DF	(China) Li Xuepeng	1	0	0	0	0	0	0	0	0	0	0	0	1	0	0
37	MF	(China) Zhao Xuri	4	0	0	0	0	0	0	0	0	0	0	0	4	0	0
TOTALS			56	1	0	5	0	0	19	0	2	2	0	0	82	1	2

=== Overview ===
	Overall	Super League	FA Cup	Champions League	Super Cup
Games played	43	30	2	10	1
Games won	28	22	1	5	0
Games drawn	5	4	0	1	0
Games lost	10	4	1	4	1
Winning rate	65.12%	73.33%	50%	50%	0%
Points won	-	70/90 (77.78%)	-		
Average Pts per game	-	2.33	-		
Goals scored	95	76	2	17	0
Goals conceded	43	28	2	12	1
Goal difference	+52	+48	0	+5	-1
Average GF per game	2.21	2.53	1	1.7	0
Average GA per game	1	0.93	1	1.2	1
Clean sheets	12	11	1	0	0
Yellow cards	82	56	5	19	2
Red cards	3	1	0	2	0
Worst discipline	(China) Zhang Linpeng (1 (red card) , 10 (yellow card) )				
Biggest win	6-0 vs Liaoning Whowin	6-0 vs Liaoning Whowin	1-0 vs Guangdong Sunray Cave	5-1 vs Cerezo Osaka	None
Biggest loss	0-2 vs Melbourne Victory	1-3 vs Changchun Yatai	1-2 vs Henan Jianye	0-2 vs Melbourne Victory	0-1 vs Guizhou Moutai
Most Appearances	(Brazil) Elkeson (39 appearances)				
Most Goals	(Brazil) Elkeson (34 goals)				
Most Assists	(China) Gao Lin (14 assists)				
