= 2014 Chinese FA Super Cup =

Guizhou Moutai	Guangzhou Evergrande
1	0
- Date: 16 February 2014
- Venue: Guiyang Olympic Sports Center, Guiyang
- Man of the Match: (China) Sun Jihai
- Referee: Tan Hai (Beijing)
- Attendance: 13,178
- Weather: Fog

The 2014 Chinese FA Super Cup (Chinese: 2014中国足球协会超级杯) is the 12th Chinese FA Super Cup. The match was played at Guiyang Olympic Sports Center on 16 February 2014, contested by Super League winners Guangzhou Evergrande and FA Cup winners Guizhou Moutai.

Guizhou Moutai defeated Guangzhou Evergrande 1–0, thus winning their first ever Chinese FA Super Cup title, and Guangzhou lost for two consecutive years.

== Match ==
=== Details ===
16 February 2014
14:00 UTC+8

Guizhou Moutai	1 – 0	Guangzhou Evergrande
Muslimović 35'

Guiyang Olympic Sports Center, Guiyang
Attendance: 13,178
Referee: Tan Hai (Beijing)

Guizhou Moutai	Guangzhou Evergrande

Guizhou:
GK	12	(China) Zhang Lie
RB	3	(China) Zhang Chenglin
CB	4	(Australia) Jonas Salley
CB	17	(China) Sun Jihai (c)
LB	31	(China) Rao Weihui		(substituted off) 46'
DM	7	(Poland) Krzysztof Mączyński		(substituted off) 77'
DM	29	(China) Yang Hao
AM	15	(China) Chen Jie
LW	6	(China) Fan Yunlong
RW	27	(China) Qu Bo
CF	9	(Bosnia and Herzegovina) Zlatan Muslimović		(substituted off) 59'
Substitutes:
GK	22	(China) Sheng Peng
DF	19	(China) Liu Tianqi
DF	23	(Chinese Taipei) Xavier Chen	(yellow card) 70'	(substituted on) 46'
DF	35	(China) Wan Houliang
MF	8	(China) Li Chunyu		(substituted on) 77'
MF	14	(China) Yang Yihu
FW	39	(China) Chen Zijie	(yellow card) 84'	(substituted on) 59'
Coach:
(China) Gong Lei

Guangzhou:
GK	1	(China) Fang Jingqi
RB	7	(China) Feng Junyan (c)
CB	24	(China) Liu Haidong
CB	26	(China) Li Jianbin	(yellow card) 84'
LB	34	(China) Hu Weiwei	(yellow card) 43'
DM	20	(China) Yang Xin
DM	35	(China) Qin Sheng
AM	39	(China) Tan Jiajun		(substituted off) 85'
LW	31	(China) Luo Jiacheng
RW	36	(China) Hu Yangyang		(substituted off) 85'
CF	30	(China) Yang Chaosheng
Substitutes:
DF	38	(China) Wen Haojun
DF	40	(China) Hu Bowen
MF	25	(China) Gan Tiancheng		(substituted on) 85'
FW	27	(China) Wang Junhui		(substituted on) 85'
Coach:
(Italy) Fabrizio Del Rosso (caretaker)

Man of the Match:
(China) Sun Jihai (Guizhou Moutai)

Assistant referees:
Huo Weiming (Beijing)
Mu Yuxin (Tianjin)
Fourth official:
Fan Qi (Beijing)

Chinese FA Super Cup
2014 Winners
Guizhou Moutai
First title
