= Dong Chunyu =

Chinese footballer (born 1991)

Dong Chunyu 董春雨
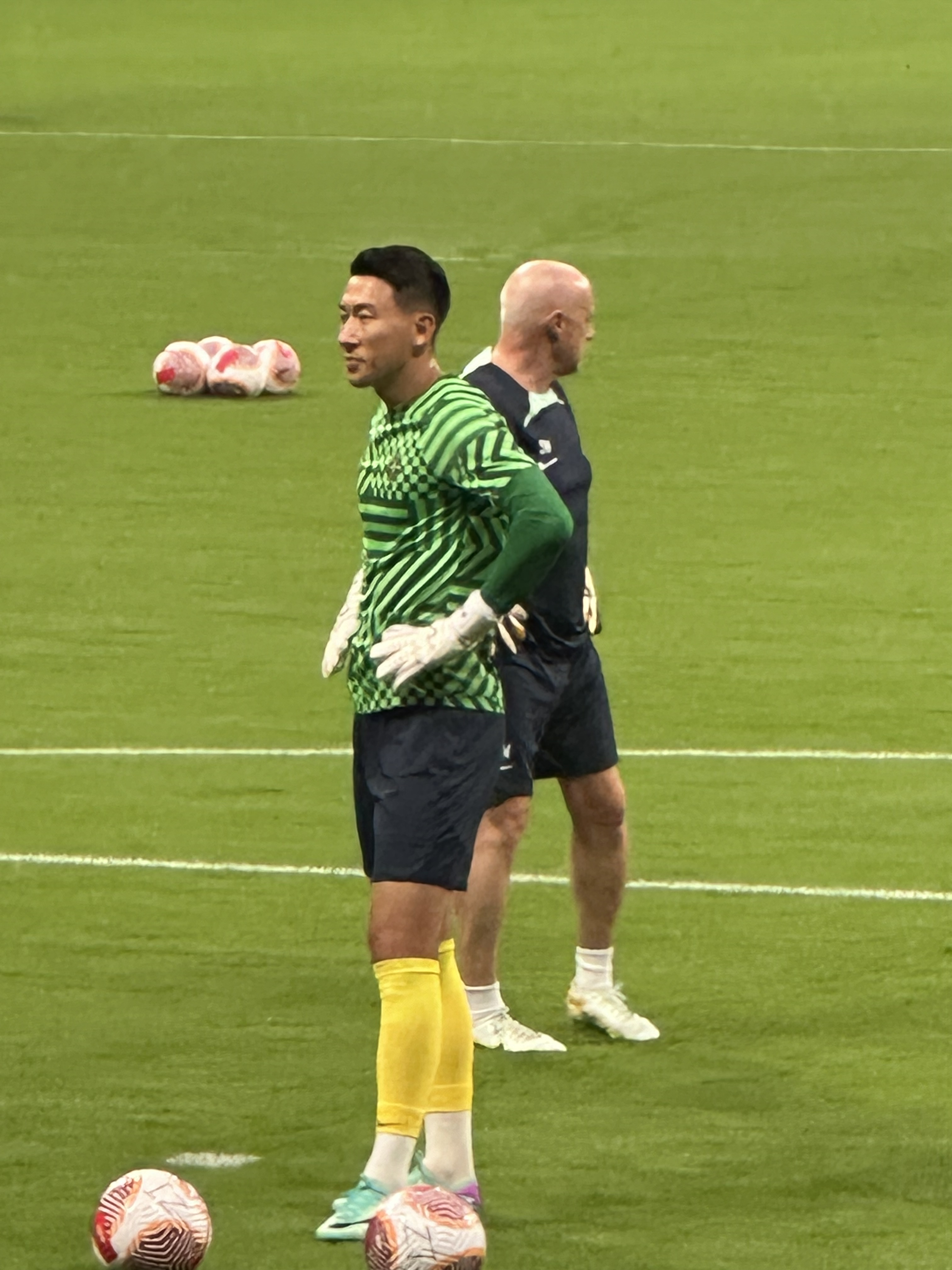
- Dong Chunyu in August 2024

Personal information
- Full name: Dong Chunyu
- Date of birth: 25 March 1991 (age 35)
- Place of birth: Shenyang, Liaoning, China
- Height: 1.87 m (6 ft 2 in)
- Position: Goalkeeper

Team information
- Current team: Zhejiang FC
- Number: 1

Youth career
- 2004: Shenzhen Jianlibao
- 2005–2007: Xiamen Lanshi
- 2008–2009: Guangzhou Evergrande

Senior career*
Years	Team	Apps	(Gls)
2010–2015	Guangzhou Evergrande	0	(0)
2011	→ Guangzhou Youth (loan)	8	(0)
2013–2014	→ Shenyang Zhongze (loan)	16	(0)
2017–2018	Beijing Enterprises	35	(0)
2019–2021	Wuhan FC	52	(0)
2022–2023	Shenzhen FC	30	(0)
2024–	Zhejiang FC	14	(0)

International career
2012–2013	China U-22		
Medal record
Representing China
Men's football
EAFF Championship
Bronze medal – third place	2019 South Korea	Team
- * Club domestic league appearances and goals as of 19 November 2026

Dong Chunyu (Chinese: 董春雨; pinyin: Dǒng Chūnyǔ; born 25 March 1991) is a Chinese footballer who plays as a left-footed goalkeeper for Zhejiang FC in the Chinese Super League.

== Club career ==
Dong Chunyu started his football career when he played for Shenzhen Jianlibao's and Xiamen Lanshi's youth academies between 2004 and 2007. He moved to Chinese Super League side Guangzhou Pharmaceutical's youth academy in 2008 after Xiamen Lanshi was dissolved and he was promoted to the club's first team in December 2009. He played as backup for Li Shuai during the 2010 league season. The next season, as Yang Jun transferred to the club, Dong became the third-choice goalkeeper within the squad. He moved to the club's youth team Guangzhou Youth to play in the China League Two for the 2011 season. Dong returned to the first team in 2012 and made his debut in the first leg of 2012 Chinese FA Cup semi-finals in which Guangzhou beat Liaoning Whowin 1-0, coming on as a substitute for Li Shuai.

On 23 January 2013, Dong was loaned to China League One side Shenyang Zhongze for the next two seasons. He played sixteen league matches for Shenyang in the 2013 season; however, he became the third-choice goalkeeper in the 2014 season after former teammate Yang Jun joined the club. In July 2014, his loan deal was ended in advance and he returned to Guangzhou. Dong was excluded from Guangzhou's first team squad in the 2016 season. Dong transferred to China League One side Beijing Enterprises in February 2017.

On 24 January 2019, Dong transferred to Super League newcomer Wuhan Zall. He would make his debut on 1 March 2019 against Beijing Sinobo Guoan F.C. in a league game that ended in a 1-0 defeat. After the game he would establish himself as the clubs first choice goalkeeper throughout the season and help keep the club in the division. The following season would see the club fight against relegation and while he would play his part in ensuring the team remained within the division the next campaign saw Dong dropped into a reserve goalkeeper position. On 18 April 2022 he would join top tier club Shenzhen. He would go on to make his debut in a league game on 7 July 2022 against Cangzhou Mighty Lions F.C. in a 2-1 victory.

== International career ==
Dong received his first call-up to the Chinese under-22 national team in April 2012 and made his debut against Malawi on 9 May 2012.

== Career statistics ==
As of 31 December 2024.

Appearances and goals by club, season and competition
Club	Season	League			National Cup		Continental		Other		Total	
Club	Season	Division	Apps	Goals	Apps	Goals	Apps	Goals	Apps	Goals	Apps	Goals
Guangzhou Evergrande	2010	China League One	0	0	-		-		-		0	0
Guangzhou Evergrande	2012	Chinese Super League	0	0	1	0	0	0	-		1	0
Guangzhou Evergrande	2015	Chinese Super League	0	0	0	0	0	0	0 (Note: Appearance(s) in Chinese FA Super Cup)	0	0	0
Guangzhou Evergrande	Total		0	0	1	0	0	0	0	0	1	0
Guangzhou Youth (loan)	2011	China League Two	8	0	-		-		-		8	0
Shenyang Zhongze (loan)	2013	China League One	16	0	1	0	-		-		17	0
Shenyang Zhongze (loan)	2014	China League One	0	0	0	0	-		-		0	0
Shenyang Zhongze (loan)	Total		16	0	1	0	0	0	0	0	17	0
Beijing Enterprises	2017	China League One	22	0	0	0	-		-		22	0
Beijing Enterprises	2018	China League One	13	0	0	0	-		-		13	0
Beijing Enterprises	Total		35	0	0	0	0	0	0	0	35	0
Wuhan Zall	2019	Chinese Super League	29	0	0	0	-		-		29	0
Wuhan Zall	2020	Chinese Super League	19	0	4	0	-		2 (Note: Appearance(s) in Promotion/Relegation Play-offs)	0	25	0
Wuhan Zall	2021	Chinese Super League	4	0	0	0	-		-		4	0
Wuhan Zall	Total		52	0	4	0	0	0	2	0	58	0
Shenzhen	2022	Chinese Super League	16	0	0	0	-		-		16	0
Shenzhen	2023	Chinese Super League	14	0	1	0	-		-		15	0
Shenzhen	Total		30	0	1	0	0	0	2	0	31	0
Zhejiang	2024	Chinese Super League	8	0	2	0	1	0	-		11	0
Career total			149	0	9	0	1	0	2	0	161	0

== Honours ==
=== Club ===
Guangzhou Evergrande

- Chinese Super League: 2012
- Chinese FA Super Cup: 2012
- China League One: 2010
