= Renê Júnior =

Brazilian footballer

Personal information
- Full name: Renê dos Santos Júnior
- Date of birth: 16 September 1989 (age 37)
- Place of birth: Rio de Janeiro, Brazil
- Height: 1.81 m (5 ft 11 1/2 in)
- Position: Midfielder

Youth career
- Criciúma

Senior career*
| Years | Team | Apps | (Gls) |
| 2007 | Estácio de Sá | | |
| 2008 | Semeando Cidadania | 0 | (0) |
| 2009–2013 | Tombense | 0 | (0) |
| 2009 | → Madureira (loan) | 0 | (0) |
| 2010 | → Figueirense (loan) | 3 | (0) |
| 2011 | → Democrata-GV (loan) | 8 | (3) |
| 2011 | → Salgueiro (loan) | 25 | (0) |
| 2012 | → Mogi Mirim (loan) | 21 | (0) |
| 2012 | → Ponte Preta (loan) | 31 | (1) |
| 2013 | → Santos (loan) | 32 | (0) |
| 2014–2016 | Guangzhou Evergrande | 31 | (8) |
| 2016–2017 | Ponte Preta | 11 | (0) |
| 2016–2017 | → Bahia (loan) | 46 | (5) |
| 2018–2020 | Corinthians | 8 | (1) |
| 2020 | → Coritiba (loan) | 9 | (0) |
| 2021 | Chapecoense | 8 | (0) |
| 2023 | Bangu | 7 | (0) |
- * Club domestic league appearances and goals as of 9 March 2023

Renê dos Santos Júnior (born 16 September 1989) is a Brazilian footballer who plays as a midfielder.

== Career ==
Renê began his professional career on Rio de Janeiro's lower clubs, before joining Figueirense. However, one year after, he joined Esporte Clube Democrata. Shortly after, he joined Salgueiro Atlético Clube.

In January 2012 he signed a contract with Mogi Mirim Esporte Clube, and after a good campaign in 2012 Campeonato Paulista, he joined Associação Atlética Ponte Preta. He made his Série A debut on 20 May, against Atlético Mineiro. He scored his first top flight goal on 6 June, against Flamengo.

On 2 January 2013, he signed a one-year contract with Santos FC.

On 24 December 2013, Chinese Super League club Guangzhou Evergrande announced that they had signed Renê on a four-year contract. According to Brazilian media, the transfer fee was 3.2 million Brazilian real (1 million Euro). On 8 March 2014, Renê made his debut for Guangzhou in the first league match of the season against Henan Jianye. He scored his first goal in China in the second half, which ensured Guangzhou win the match 3–0. In March 2016 it was announced that Renê's contract with the club had been terminated and he would leave as a free agent.

He returned to Ponte Preta on 1 April 2016.

== Career statistics ==
As of 6 November 2023

| Club | Season | League | | | State League | | Cup | | Continental | | Other | | Total | |
| Club | Season | Division | Apps | Goals | Apps | Goals | Apps | Goals | Apps | Goals | Apps | Goals | Apps | Goals |
|---|---|---|---|---|---|---|---|---|---|---|---|---|---|---|
| Semeando Cidadania | 2008 | Carioca Série C | — | | 0 | 0 | — | | — | | 8 (Note: All appearance(s) in Copa Rio) | 1 | 8 | 1 |
| Figueirense | 2010 | Série B | 0 | 0 | 3 | 0 | — | | — | | — | | 3 | 0 |
| Democrata-GV | 2011 | Mineiro | — | | 8 | 3 | — | | — | | — | | 8 | 3 |
| Salgueiro | 2011 | Série B | 25 | 0 | — | | — | | — | | — | | 25 | 0 |
| Mogi Mirim | 2012 | Série D | 0 | 0 | 21 | 3 | — | | — | | — | | 21 | 3 |
| Ponte Preta | 2012 | Série A | 31 | 1 | — | | — | | — | | — | | 31 | 1 |
| Santos | 2013 | Série A | 13 | 0 | 19 | 0 | 5 | 0 | — | | — | | 37 | 0 |
| Guangzhou Evergrande | 2014 | Super League | 26 | 8 | — | | — | | — | | — | | 26 | 8 |
| Guangzhou Evergrande | 2015 | Super League | 5 | 0 | — | | 1 | 0 | 2 | 0 | — | | 8 | 0 |
| Guangzhou Evergrande | Total | | 31 | 8 | — | | 1 | 0 | 2 | 0 | 0 | 0 | 34 | 8 |
| Ponte Preta | 2016 | Série A | 11 | 0 | — | | — | | — | | — | | 11 | 0 |
| Bahia | 2016 | Série B | 9 | 0 | — | | — | | — | | — | | 9 | 0 |
| Bahia | 2017 | Série A | 30 | 4 | 7 | 1 | 2 | 0 | — | | 9 (Note: All appearance(s) in Copa do Nordeste) | 0 | 48 | 5 |
| Bahia | Total | | 39 | 4 | 7 | 1 | 2 | 0 | — | | 9 | 0 | 57 | 5 |
| Corinthians | 2018 | Série A | 4 | 0 | 3 | 1 | — | | 1 (Note: All appearance(s) in Copa Libertadores) | 0 | — | | 8 | 1 |
| Corinthians | 2019 | Série A | 1 | 0 | 0 | 0 | 0 | 0 | — | | — | | 1 | 0 |
| Corinthians | Total | | 5 | 0 | 3 | 1 | 0 | 0 | 1 | 0 | — | | 9 | 1 |
| Coritiba | 2020 | Série A | 3 | 0 | 6 | 0 | 1 | 0 | — | | — | | 10 | 0 |
| Chapecoense | 2021 | Série A | 8 | 0 | — | | — | | — | | — | | 8 | 0 |
| Bangu | 2023 | Carioca | — | | 7 | 0 | — | | — | | — | | 7 | 0 |
| Career total | | | 166 | 13 | 74 | 8 | 9 | 0 | 3 | 0 | 17 | 1 | 269 | 22 |

== Honours ==
Bahia

- Copa do Nordeste: 2017

Guangzhou Evergrande

- Chinese Super League: 2014

Corinthians

- Campeonato Paulista: 2018
