= Yang Xin (footballer) =

Chinese footballer

Yang Xin 杨鑫
Personal information
- Full name: Yang Xin
- Date of birth: 25 January 1994 (age 32)
- Place of birth: Jingdezhen, Jiangxi, China
- Height: 1.85 m (6 ft 1 in)
- Position: Defensive midfielder

Team information
- Current team: Guangzhou Evergrande

Youth career
- 2004–2013: Guangzhou Yida
- 2013–2014: Guangzhou Evergrande

Senior career*
Years	Team	Apps	(Gls)
2014–2017	Guangzhou Evergrande	0	(0)
2018–2019	Jiangxi Liansheng	41	(2)
2020–	Guangzhou Evergrande	0	(0)
- * Club domestic league appearances and goals as of 31 December 2020

Yang Xin (Chinese: 杨鑫; pinyin: Yáng Xīn; Mandarin pronunciation: [jǎŋ ɕín]; born 25 January 1994) is a Chinese footballer who currently plays for Jiangxi Liansheng in the China League One.

== Club career ==
Yang Xin started to play organized football at the age of 7. He was scouted by Zhao Dayu in 2004 and moved to Guangzhou Yida football school. He then joined Chinese Super League side Guangzhou Evergrande in 2013 and was promoted to the club's first team in 2014, which made him the only player from Jiangxi in the 2014 Chinese Super League. Yang made his senior debut on 16 February 2014 against Guizhou Renhe in a 1–0 defeat in the 2014 Chinese FA Super Cup. Yang was demoted to the reserve squad in the 2016 season. On 20 January 2017, he received a ban of five months by the Chinese Football Association for age falsification which he changed his age from 25 January 1994 to 25 January 1995 when he was at Guangzhou Yida.

On 11 March 2018, Yang transferred to his hometown club Jiangxi Liansheng in the China League Two.

== Career statistics ==
As of 31 December 2020

Appearances and goals by club, season and competition
Club	Season	League			National Cup		Continental		Other		Total	
Club	Season	Division	Apps	Goals	Apps	Goals	Apps	Goals	Apps	Goals	Apps	Goals
Guangzhou Evergrande	2014	Chinese Super League	0	0	0	0	0	0	1 (Note: Appearances in Chinese FA Super Cup)	0	1	0
Guangzhou Evergrande	2015	Chinese Super League	0	0	1	0	0	0	0	0	1	0
Guangzhou Evergrande	Total		0	0	1	0	0	0	1	0	2	0
Jiangxi Liansheng	2018	China League Two	24	2	1	0	-		-		25	2
Jiangxi Liansheng	2019	China League Two	17	0	2	0	-		-		19	0
Jiangxi Liansheng	Total		41	2	3	0	0	0	0	0	44	2
Total			41	2	4	0	0	0	1	0	46	2
