= Wang Junhui =

Chinese footballer (born 1995)

Wang Junhui 王军辉
Personal information
- Full name: Wang Junhui
- Date of birth: 18 May 1995 (age 31)
- Place of birth: Shenzhen, Guangdong, China
- Height: 1.82 m (5 ft 11 1/2 in)
- Position: Winger

Youth career
- 2013–2014: Guangzhou Evergrande

Senior career*
Years	Team	Apps	(Gls)
2014–2020	Guangzhou Evergrande	11	(0)
2016	→ Shijiazhuang Ever Bright (loan)	0	(0)
2016	→ Wuhan Zall (loan)	1	(0)
2019	→ Liaoning FC (loan)	16	(1)
2021–2022	Inner Mongolia Caoshangfei	5	(2)
2023	Dandong Tengyue	2	(0)

International career^{‡}
2015–2016	China U23	3	(0)
- * Club domestic league appearances and goals as of 25 April 2022 ‡ National team caps and goals as of 31 December 2016

Wang Junhui
- Simplified Chinese: 王军辉
Transcriptions
Standard Mandarin
- Hanyu Pinyin: Wáng Jūnhuī
- IPA: [wǎŋ tɕýn xwéɪ]
Yue: Cantonese
- Jyutping: Wong4 Gwan1-fai1
- IPA: [wɔŋ˩ kʷɐn˥ fɐj˥]

Wang Junhui (simplified Chinese: 王军辉; traditional Chinese: 王軍輝; pinyin: Wáng Jūnhuī; born 18 May 1995) is a Chinese actor and former professional footballer.

== Club career ==
Wang Junhui started his football career when he joined Guangzhou Evergrande's youth academy in 2013. He was then promoted to the club's first team in 2014. He made his debut for the club on 16 February 2014 in a 1–0 loss to Guizhou Renhe in the 2014 Chinese FA Super Cup, coming on as a substitute for Luo Jiacheng in the 85th minute. He later made his second appearance for the club on 5 May 2015 in a 2–0 loss against Western Sydney Wanderers in the 2015 AFC Champions League, coming on for injured Elkeson in the 75th minute. He became a rotation player in the middle of the 2015 season when the club faced an injury crisis, making 13 appearances over the course of the season.

On 16 January 2016, Wang was loaned to fellow top tier side Shijiazhuang Ever Bright for the 2016 season. He made his debut for the club on 11 May 2016 in a 1–0 win over Beijing Renhe in the 2016 Chinese FA Cup. On 15 July 2016, Wang terminated his loan deal with Shijiazhuang and was loaned to China League One side Wuhan Zall for half plus one season. On 24 July 2016, he made his debut for the club in a 2–0 win against Shenzhen FC, coming on for Luo Yi in the 57th minute. However, he was substituted out for injury just six minutes later. After playing just six minutes for the club in the 2016 season, Wang's loan deal was ended in advance at the end of the season.

On 9 April 2018, Wang involved himself in an on-pitch brawl with teammate Situ Hualong and was sent off during Guangzhou Evergrande's reserve league match against Shandong Luneng Taishan. He was fined ¥200,000 and suspended for training and playing by the club. On 12 April 2018, he was handed a 10-month suspension from 10 April 2018 to 9 February 2019 by the CFA.

== Career statistics ==
As of 31 December 2020.

Appearances and goals by club, season and competition
Club	Season	League			National Cup		Continental		Other		Total	
Club	Season	Division	Apps	Goals	Apps	Goals	Apps	Goals	Apps	Goals	Apps	Goals
Guangzhou Evergrande	2014	Chinese Super League	0	0	0	0	0	0	1 (Note: Appearances in Chinese FA Super Cup)	0	1	0
Guangzhou Evergrande	2015	Chinese Super League	11	0	1	0	1	0	0	0	13	0
Guangzhou Evergrande	2017	Chinese Super League	0	0	0	0	0	0	0	0	0	0
Guangzhou Evergrande	2018	Chinese Super League	0	0	0	0	0	0	0	0	0	0
Guangzhou Evergrande	Total		11	0	1	0	1	0	1	0	14	0
Shijiazhuang Ever Bright (loan)	2016	Chinese Super League	0	0	2	0	-		-		2	0
Wuhan Zall (loan)	2016	China League One	1	0	0	0	-		-		1	0
Liaoning FC (loan)	2019	China League One	14	1	0	0	-		2 (Note: Appearances in China League One relegation play-offs games)	0	16	1
Career total			26	1	3	0	1	0	3	0	33	1

== Honours ==
=== Club ===
Guangzhou Evergrande

- Chinese Super League: 2014, 2015
- AFC Champions League: 2015
- Chinese FA Super Cup: 2014
