= Liu Haidong =

Chinese footballer (born 1995)

Liu Haidong 刘海东
Personal information
- Full name: Liu Haidong
- Date of birth: 28 February 1995 (age 31)
- Place of birth: Shenyang, Liaoning, China
- Height: 1.82 m (5 ft 11 1/2 in)
- Position: Defender

Youth career
- 2013–2014: Guangzhou Evergrande

Senior career*
Years	Team	Apps	(Gls)
2014–2018	Guangzhou Evergrande	2	(0)
2017	→ Heilongjiang Lava Spring (loan)	15	(2)
2018	Hainan Boying	17	(5)
2019–2021	Guangzhou FC		
2022–2023	Guangxi Hengchen		

International career^{‡}
2013–2014	China U-20	6	(2)
- * Club domestic league appearances and goals as of 31 December 2020 ‡ National team caps and goals as of 8 June 2014

Liu Haidong (Chinese: 刘海东; pinyin: Liú Hǎidōng; born 28 February 1995) is a Chinese former footballer who played as defender.

== Club career ==
Liu Haidong started his football career when he was promoted to Guangzhou Evergrande's first team for the 2014 season. He made his debut for the club on 13 February 2014 against Guizhou Renhe in the 2014 Chinese FA Super Cup. His league debut came on 3 May 2014 against Shanghai Shenxin in a 1–0 away win. On 8 November 2014, he suffered a cruciate ligament rupture in the first training section after Fabio Cannavaro became the new manager of the club. He recovered from injury and was included in Guangzhou Evergrande's reserve squad in the summer of 2016. In March 2017, Liu loaned to China League Two side Heilongjiang Lava Spring. In March 2018, Liu loaned to China League Two side Hainan Boying.

== Career statistics ==
As of 31 December 2020

Season	Club	League			FA Cup		Asia		Others		Total	
Season	Club	Division	Apps	Goals	Apps	Goals	Apps	Goals	Apps	Goals	Apps	Goals
2014	Guangzhou Evergrande	Chinese Super League	2	0	1	0	0	0	1	0	4	0
2017	Heilongjiang Lava Spring (loan)	China League Two	15	2	2	0	-		-		17	2
2018	Hainan Boying (loan)	China League Two	17	5	4	3	-		-		21	8
Career total			36	7	7	3	0	0	1	0	42	10

== Honours ==
=== Club ===
Guangzhou Evergrande

- Chinese Super League: 2014
