= Zhao Xuri =

Chinese footballer

Zhao Xuri 赵旭日
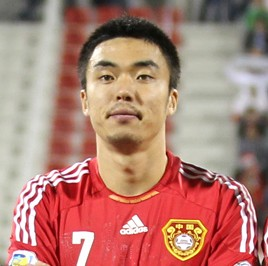
- Zhao with China in 2009

Personal information
- Date of birth: 3 December 1985 (age 40)
- Place of birth: Dalian, Liaoning, China
- Height: 1.85 m (6 ft 1 in)
- Position: Defensive midfielder

Youth career
- 1998–2000: Dalian Yiteng
- 2000–2001: Dalian Shide

Senior career*
Years	Team	Apps	(Gls)
2002	Dalian Sidelong	0	(0)
2003–2004	Sichuan First City	37	(4)
2005–2009	Dalian Shide	123	(10)
2010–2011	Shaanxi Renhe	50	(0)
2012–2015	Guangzhou Evergrande	80	(5)
2016–2018	Tianjin Quanjian	72	(11)
2019–2021	Dalian Professional	37	(1)
2022	Sichuan Jiuniu	18	(1)
2023	Guangxi Pingguo Haliao	22	(1)

International career
2005	China U19		
2008	China U23	2	(0)
2003–2019	China	87	(2)
Medal record
Representing China
Men's football
EAFF Championship
Bronze medal – third place	2003 Japan	Team
Gold medal – first place	2005 South Korea	Team
Gold medal – first place	2010 Japan	Team
Bronze medal – third place	2017 Japan	Team
East Asian Games
Gold medal – first place	2001 Macau	Football
AFC Youth Championship
Silver medal – second place	2004 َ Malaysia	Team
- * Club domestic league appearances and goals

Zhao Xuri
- Simplified Chinese: 赵旭日
- Traditional Chinese: 趙旭日
Transcriptions
Standard Mandarin
- Hanyu Pinyin: Zhào Xùrì
- IPA: [ʈʂâʊ ɕŷ ɻɻ̩̂]

Zhao Xuri (Chinese: 赵旭日; pinyin: Zhào Xùrì; born 3 December 1985) is a Chinese former professional footballer who played as a midfielder.

== Club career ==
While Zhao Xuri started his football career with second tier side Dalian Sidelong, he did not make an impact in the squad; however, top tier side Sichuan First City took an interest within the youngster. During the 2003 league season, he quickly rose to prominence and immediately established himself as an integral member within the team by playing in 27 league games and scoring two goals in his debut season. The following season was to prove significantly more difficult as Zhao was injured through most of the season only making nine appearances. He was still highly regarded enough to be transferred to Dalian Shide at the start of the 2005 season where, due to his versatility, he continued to establish himself as a regular and go on win the top tier title in 2005. He then transferred to Shaanxi Renhe at the start of the 2010 season.

Zhao transferred to Guangzhou Evergrande on 26 December 2011 along with Rong Hao, Li Jianbin and Peng Xinli. He made his debut for the club on 25 February 2012 in a 2–1 win against Tianjin Teda in the 2012 Chinese FA Super Cup. He scored first goal for the club on 21 July 2012 in a 2–1 win against Henan Jianye.

On 21 January 2016, Zhao transferred to China League One side Tianjin Quanjian. He made his debut for the club on 13 March 2016 in a 3–0 win against Qingdao Huanghai. He scored his first goal for the club on 19 March 2016 in a 5–2 win against Zhejiang Yiteng.

On 13 February 2019, Zhao transferred to fellow Chinese Super League side Dalian Professional. After three seasons with the club he left on a free transfer to join Sichuan Jiuniu on 1 May 2022.

== International career ==
Zhao's performances for Sichuan First City in the 2003 season were enough for an immediate call-up to the Chinese national team to play in the 2003 East Asian Football Championship. He made his debut during the tournament on 7 December 2003 in a 1–0 loss against South Korea. During the tournament, he also went on to score his first goal on 10 December 2003 in a 3–1 win against Hong Kong. His versatility saw him gain significant playing time and go on to be selected in the squad to participate in the 2007 AFC Asian Cup where he played in two group games in an unsuccessful competition that saw China knocked out in the group stage.

In 2008, Zhao was eligible to play in the 2008 Summer Olympics where he played two of the three group games in the tournament. Once the tournament ended, he found himself completely dropped from the national team until then manager Gao Hongbo named him in his first game on 29 May 2009 in a 1–1 draw against Germany.

== Career statistics ==
=== Club ===
As of 31 December 2021

Appearances and goals by club, season and competition
Club	Season	League			National cup		League cup		Continental		Other		Total	
Club	Season	Division	Apps	Goals	Apps	Goals	Apps	Goals	Apps	Goals	Apps	Goals	Apps	Goals
Dalian Sidelong	2002	Chinese Jia-B League	0	0	0	0	–		–		–		0	0
Sichuan First City	2003	Chinese Jia-A League	27	2	3	0	–		–		–		30	2
Sichuan First City	2004	Chinese Super League	10	2	3	0	0	0	–		–		13	2
Sichuan First City	Total		37	4	6	0	0	0	0	0	0	0	43	4
Dalian Shide	2005	Chinese Super League	21	2	5	0	0	0	–		–		26	2
Dalian Shide	2006	Chinese Super League	27	2	6	1	–		5	0	–		38	3
Dalian Shide	2007	Chinese Super League	25	4	–		–		–		–		25	4
Dalian Shide	2008	Chinese Super League	23	1	–		–		–		–		23	1
Dalian Shide	2009	Chinese Super League	27	1	–		–		–		–		27	1
Dalian Shide	Total		123	10	11	1	0	0	5	0	0	0	139	11
Shaanxi Renhe	2010	Chinese Super League	24	0	–		–		–		–		24	0
Shaanxi Renhe	2011	Chinese Super League	26	0	0	0	–		–		–		26	0
Shaanxi Renhe	Total		50	0	0	0	0	0	0	0	0	0	50	0
Guangzhou Evergrande	2012	Chinese Super League	20	1	5	1	–		8	0	1 (Note: Appearances in Chinese FA Super Cup)	0	34	2
Guangzhou Evergrande	2013	Chinese Super League	22	2	5	0	–		13	0	4 (Note: One appearance in Chinese FA Super Cup, Three appearances in FIFA Club World Cup)	0	44	2
Guangzhou Evergrande	2014	Chinese Super League	21	2	2	0	–		6	0	0	0	29	2
Guangzhou Evergrande	2015	Chinese Super League	17	0	1	0	–		8	1	1	0	27	1
Guangzhou Evergrande	Total		80	5	13	1	0	0	35	1	6	0	134	7
Tianjin Quanjian	2016	China League One	22	6	2	1	–		–		–		24	7
Tianjin Quanjian	2017	Chinese Super League	26	3	4	0	–		–		–		30	3
Tianjin Quanjian	2018	Chinese Super League	24	2	1	0	–		10	3	–		35	5
Tianjin Quanjian	Total		72	11	7	1	0	0	10	3	0	0	89	15
Dalian Professional	2019	Chinese Super League	9	0	3	0	–		–		–		12	0
Dalian Professional	2020	Chinese Super League	10	0	0	0	–		–		–		10	0
Dalian Professional	2021	Chinese Super League	18	1	1	0	–		–		2 (Note: Appearance(s) in CSL Relegation play-offs)	0	21	1
Dalian Professional	Total		37	1	4	0	0	0	0	0	2	0	43	1
Career total			399	31	41	3	0	0	50	4	8	0	498	38

=== International ===
Appearances and goals by national team and year
National team	Year	Apps	Goals
China	2003	2	1
China	2004	6	0
China	2005	3	0
China	2006	6	0
China	2007	3	0
China	2008	0	0
China	2009	11	0
China	2010	8	0
China	2011	9	0
China	2012	6	0
China	2013	9	1
China	2014	4	0
China	2015	0	0
China	2016	0	0
China	2017	6	0
China	2018	10	0
China	2019	4	0
Total		87	2

As of 6 February 2013

Scores and results list China's goal tally first.

No	Date	Venue	Opponent	Score	Result	Competition
1.	10 December 2003	International Stadium Yokohama, Yokohama, Japan	Hong Kong	1–0	3–1	2003 East Asian Football Championship
2.	6 February 2013	Prince Mohamed bin Fahd Stadium, Dammam, Saudi Arabia	Saudi Arabia	1–1	1–2	2015 AFC Asian Cup qualifier

== Honours ==
Dalian Shide

- Chinese Super League: 2005
- Chinese FA Cup: 2005

Guangzhou Evergrande

- Chinese Super League: 2012, 2013, 2014, 2015
- Chinese FA Cup: 2012
- Chinese FA Super Cup: 2012
- AFC Champions League: 2013, 2015

Tianjin Quanjian

- China League One: 2016

China PR national football team

- East Asian Football Championship: 2005, 2010
