= Peng Xinli =

Chinese footballer

Peng Xinli 彭欣力
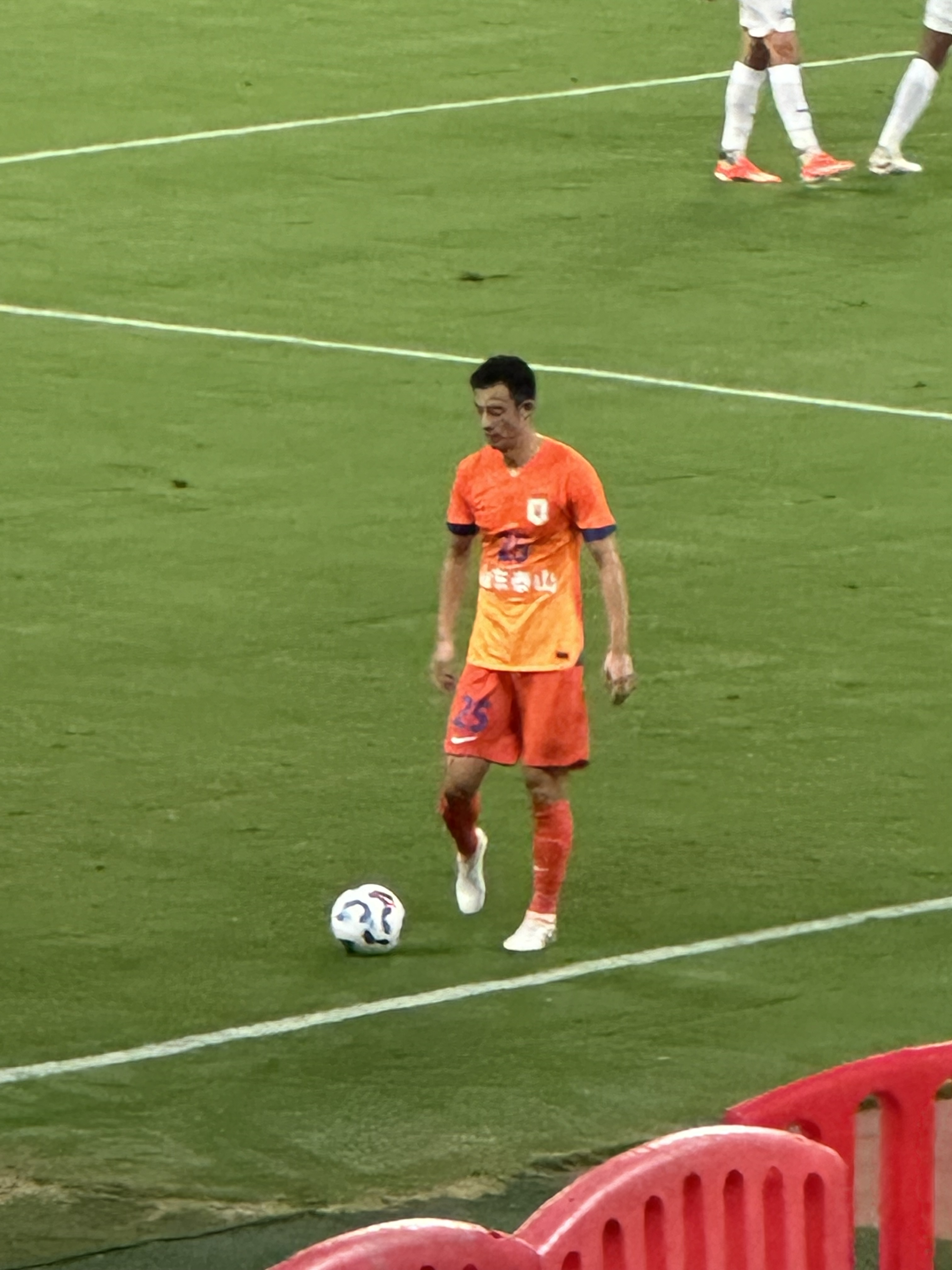
- Peng Xinli in August 2024

Personal information
- Full name: Peng Xinli
- Date of birth: 22 July 1991 (age 35)
- Place of birth: Chengdu, Sichuan, China
- Height: 1.77 m (5 ft 9 1/2 in)
- Position: Midfielder

Team information
- Current team: Qingdao West Coast
- Number: 25

Senior career*
Years	Team	Apps	(Gls)
2008–2011	Chengdu Blades	34	(3)
2012–2016	Guangzhou Evergrande	2	(0)
2013	→ Chengdu Blades (loan)	14	(2)
2014	→ Meizhou Hakka (loan)	13	(3)
2015–2016	→ Chongqing Lifan (loan)	28	(1)
2017–2019	Chongqing Lifan	72	(4)
2019–2023	Shanghai Shenhua	67	(7)
2023	→ Qingdao Hainiu (loan)	14	(1)
2024–2025	Shandong Taishan	28	(2)
2025	→ Changchun Yatai (loan)	5	(0)
2026–	Qingdao West Coast	21	(3)

International career^{‡}
2009–2010	China U19		
2018–2019	China	2	(0)
- * Club domestic league appearances and goals as of 19 November 2026 ‡ National team caps and goals as of 12 July 2025

Peng Xinli
- Chinese: 彭欣力
Transcriptions
Standard Mandarin
- Hanyu Pinyin: Péng Xīnlì
- IPA: [pʰə̌ŋ ɕín lî]

Peng Xinli (Chinese: 彭欣力; pinyin: Péng Xīnlì; born 22 July 1991 in Chengdu) is a Chinese professional footballer who currently plays as a left-footed midfielder for Chinese Super League club Qingdao West Coast.

== Club career ==
=== Chengdu Blades ===
Peng Xinli was considered a technically gifted player as a youngster and was sent out to Ligue 2 side FC Metz by the Chengdu Football Association to study and practice abroad for two months. When he returned to China, he would join Chengdu Blades and go on to make his senior debut in a league game against Shandong Luneng on 28 June 2008 in a 2-1 defeat. Under then manager Li Bing, he was viewed as a promising youngster and would often come on as a substitute throughout the 2008 league season until he was given his first start against Shenzhen Xiangxue on 25 October 2008 in a 3-1 victory. For the next several seasons he was used sparingly until in 2011 Chinese Super League season he established himself as an integral member of the team scoring three goals in 27 appearances, however despite this it wasn't enough to keep Chengdu within the top tier.

=== Guangzhou Evergrande ===
Peng transferred to Guangzhou Evergrande on 26 December 2011 along with Zhao Xuri, Li Jianbin, and Rong Hao. He would make his debut for the club on 18 July 2012 in a Chinese FA Cup game against Henan Jianye in a 2-1 victory. Within the league, Peng would not make his debut until the last game of the season against Beijing Guoan on 3 November 2012 in a 1-0 defeat, despite the defeat Guangzhou Evergrande had already won the 2012 Chinese Super League. The following season Peng would continue to struggle to establish himself within the team, however he would scored his first and second goal for the club in the 2013 Chinese FA Cup in which Guangzhou beat China League Two side Dali Ruilong 7-1 on 10 July 2013 a day before he was loaned back to Chengdu.

=== Chongqing Lifan ===
On 11 February 2015, Peng was loaned to fellow Chinese Super League side Chongqing Lifan until 31 December 2015. He would make his debut for the club on 8 March 2015 in a league game against Beijing Sinobo Guoan that ended in a 3-0 defeat. On 19 February 2016, Chongqing extended his loan deal for another season. This was followed by his first goal for the club in a league game against Hangzhou Greentown in a 1-1 draw. He made a permanent transfer to Chongqing Lifan in February 2017.

=== Shanghai Shenhua ===
On 24 July 2019, Peng joined fellow Chinese Super League side Shanghai Shenhua. On 27 July 2019, Peng made his debut for Shenhua in a 5-3 home win against Guangzhou R&F. On 6 December 2019, Peng won the 2019 Chinese FA Cup with Shenhua in his debut season, after a 3-0 home win and aggregated score of 3-1 against Shandong Luneng.

On 19 August 2020, he scored his first goal for Shenhua in a 3-2 defeat against Guangzhou R&F. On 18 November 2020, he made his AFC Champions League debut and scored a goal in a 2-1 win against Australian side Perth Glory in the 2020 AFC Champions League group stage.

==== Qingdao Hainiu(loan) ====
On 7 July 2023, due to a lack of playing time at Shenhua, Peng joined fellow Chinese Super League club Qingdao Hainiu on loan for the remainder of the season.

=== Shandong Taishan ===
On 25 January 2024, Peng joined fellow Chinese Super League club Shandong Taishan. On 13 February, he made his debut for Shandong in a 3-2 home defeat against Japanese club Kawasaki Frontale in the first leg of 2023–24 AFC Champions League Round of 16.

On 17 July 2025, Peng was loaned out to Changchun Yatai.

=== Qingdao West Coast ===
On 16 February 2026, Peng joined Chinese Super League club Qingdao West Coast.

== International career ==
Peng was called up to the Chinese U19 in 2009. He also took part in the 2010 AFC U-19 Championship qualification, playing in most of China's matches. He made his debut for Chinese national team on 26 March 2018 in a 4–1 loss against Czech Republic in 2018 China Cup, coming on as a substitution for Fan Xiaodong in the 72nd minute.

== Career statistics ==
=== Club statistics ===
Statistics accurate as of match played 1 November 2025.

Appearances and goals by club, season and competition
Club	Season	League			National Cup		Continental		Other		Total	
Club	Season	Division	Apps	Goals	Apps	Goals	Apps	Goals	Apps	Goals	Apps	Goals
Chengdu Blades	2008	Chinese Super League	4	0	-		-		-		4	0
Chengdu Blades	2009	Chinese Super League	2	0	-		-		-		2	0
Chengdu Blades	2010	China League One	1	0	-		-		-		1	0
Chengdu Blades	2011	Chinese Super League	27	3	1	0	-		-		28	3
Chengdu Blades	Total		34	3	1	0	0	0	0	0	35	3
Guangzhou Evergrande	2012	Chinese Super League	1	0	2	0	0	0	0 (Note: Appearances in Chinese FA Super Cup)	0	3	0
Guangzhou Evergrande	2013	Chinese Super League	1	0	1	2	0	0	0	0	2	2
Guangzhou Evergrande	Total		2	0	3	2	0	0	0	0	5	2
Chengdu Blades (Loan)	2013	China League One	14	2	0	0	-		-		14	2
Meizhou Kejia (Loan)	2014	China League Two	13	3	1	1	-		-		14	4
Chongqing Lifan (Loan)	2015	Chinese Super League	10	0	2	0	-		-		12	0
Chongqing Lifan (Loan)	2016	Chinese Super League	18	1	0	0	-		-		18	1
Chongqing Lifan (Loan)	Total		28	1	2	0	0	0	0	0	30	1
Chongqing Lifan	2017	Chinese Super League	27	2	0	0	-		-		27	2
Chongqing Lifan	2018	Chinese Super League	29	1	1	0	-		-		30	1
Chongqing Lifan	2019	Chinese Super League	16	1	1	1	-		-		17	2
Chongqing Lifan	Total		72	4	2	1	0	0	0	0	74	5
Shanghai Shenhua	2019	Chinese Super League	10	0	2	0	-		-		12	0
Shanghai Shenhua	2020	Chinese Super League	18	4	1	0	6	1	-		25	5
Shanghai Shenhua	2021	Chinese Super League	15	2	6	0	-		-		21	2
Shanghai Shenhua	2022	Chinese Super League	24	1	0	0	-		-		24	1
Shanghai Shenhua	2023	Chinese Super League	4	0	1	0	-		-		5	0
Shanghai Shenhua	Total		71	7	10	0	6	1	0	0	87	8
Qingdao Hainiu (loan)	2023	Chinese Super League	14	1	0	0	-		-		14	1
Shandong Taishan	2024	Chinese Super League	16	2	5	0	9	0	-		30	2
Shandong Taishan	2025	Chinese Super League	12	0	1	0	1	0	-		14	0
Shandong Taishan	Total		28	2	6	0	10	0	0	0	44	2
Changchun Yatai (loan)	2025	Chinese Super League	5	0	-		-		-		5	0
Career total			281	23	25	4	16	1	0	0	322	28

=== International statistics ===
National team
Year	Apps	Goals
2018	1	0
2019	1	0
Total	2	0

== Honours ==
=== Club ===
Guangzhou Evergrande

- Chinese Super League: 2012, 2013
- Chinese FA Cup: 2012, 2013

Shanghai Shenhua

- Chinese FA Cup: 2019
