= Fabrizio Del Rosso =

Italian footballer and manager

Personal information
- Date of birth: 25 May 1963 (age 63)
- Place of birth: Montecatini Terme, Italy
- Height: 1.78 m (5 ft 10 in)
- Position: Forward

Team information
- Current team: Lecce (assistant)

Youth career
- –1982: Casale
- 1982–1983: Fiorentina

Senior career*
Years	Team	Apps	(Gls)
1983–1984	Messina		
1984–1986	Cosenza		
1986–1987	Messina	8	(0)
1987–1988	Catania		
1988–1990	Cavese		
1990–1991	Montevarchi	23	(4)
1991–1993	Prato	47	(7)
Total		79	(11)

Managerial career
- 2004–2005: Prato
- 2009: Poggibonsi
- 2011–2012: Juventus U17
- 2012–2013: Juventus U19 (assistant)
- 2013–2015: Guangzhou Evergrande (assistant)
- 2013–2015: Guangzhou Evergrande Reserves
- 2015–2016: Novara (assistant)
- 2016: Benevento (assistant)
- 2016–2019: China (assistant)
- 2017–2019: China U23 (assistant)
- 2020–2021: Reggina (assistant)
- 2021–2023: Lecce (assistant)
- 2023–2024: Hellas Verona (assistant)
- 2024–2025: [[SS Lazio|Lazio]] (assistant)
- 2025-: Lecce (assistant)
- * Club domestic league appearances and goals

Fabrizio Del Rosso (born 25 May 1963) is an Italian former footballer, who serves as assistant coach of Serie A club Lecce.
