= Rong Hao =

Chinese footballer

Rong Hao 荣昊
Personal information
- Full name: Rong Hao
- Date of birth: 7 April 1987 (age 39)
- Place of birth: Wuhan, Hubei, China
- Height: 1.77 m (5 ft 10 in)
- Position: Left-back

Youth career
- 2003–2005: Wuhan Guanggu

Senior career*
Years	Team	Apps	(Gls)
2006–2008	Wuhan Guanggu	33	(1)
2009	Jiangsu Sainty	27	(0)
2010–2011	Hangzhou Greentown	50	(1)
2012–2020	Guangzhou Evergrande	71	(4)
2018	→ Shanghai Shenhua (loan)	23	(1)
2019–2020	→ Tianjin Teda (loan)	35	(3)
2021	Wuhan Three Towns	18	(3)
2022	Zhejiang Professional	1	(0)
2022	Guangzhou FC	15	(0)

International career^{‡}
2009–2016	China	43	(0)
Medal record
Representing China
Men's football
EAFF Championship
Gold medal – first place	2010 Japan	Team
Silver medal – second place	2013 South Korea	Team
- * Club domestic league appearances and goals as of 15 December 2022 ‡ National team caps and goals as of 2 November 2018

Rong Hao (Chinese: 荣昊; pinyin: Róng Hào; Mandarin pronunciation: [ɻʊ̌ŋ xâʊ]; born 7 April 1987) is a Chinese former professional footballer as a right-footed left-back.

== Club career ==
Rong Hao started his football career with Wuhan Guanggu in 2006, making his debut and scoring his first goal for the club on 27 May 2006 in a 1-0 win against Shenyang Ginde. He then played in five more league games at the end of the 2006 season. By the following season, he began to gradually establish himself as a regular for the club despite usually coming on as a substitute; however, Wuhan were suddenly ejected from the top tier and subsequently relegated during the 2008 season after the club's management refused to accept the punishment given to them by the Chinese Football Association after a scuffle broke out on 27 September 2008 in a 1-1 draw against Beijing Guoan. Rong then found himself unable to play any football without a club.

In the 2009 season, newly promoted club Jiangsu Sainty were willing to take Rong on loan. He immediately established himself as the regular for the club and helped guide them to a tenth-place position. Once his loan ended, Rong transferred to fellow top tier side Hangzhou Greentown and helped guide the club to a fourth-place finish, allowing them to play in the AFC Champions League for the first time in the club's history.

On 26 December 2011, Rong transferred to Guangzhou Evergrande along with Zhao Xuri, Li Jianbin and Peng Xinli. Rong was injured for most of the 2012 season and was in no condition to take part in any matches. He won 13 major trophies during his 6-year stay in his first spell for Guangzhou, including 6 Chinese Super League and 2 AFC Champions League titles. On 28 February 2018, Rong was loaned to fellow top tier side Shanghai Shenhua for the 2018 season. On 28 February 2019, Rong was loaned out to fellow top tier side Tianjin Teda for the 2019 season. On 12 April 2021, Rong joined hometown club Wuhan Three Towns, where he won the 2021 China League One and achieved promotion to the Chinese Super League with the team. On 13 February 2022, Rong returned to newly-promoted Zhejiang Pro (formerly named Hangzhou Greentown) after 11 years, and he expressed the intention to retire at the club. However, due to personal and family reasons, he only played 1 game for Zhejiang during his second spell. On 27 August 2022, Rong returned to Guangzhou F.C. (formerly named Guangzhou Evergrande) after terminating his contract with Zhejiang, stating that he is willing to play for them for free in order to save the club from its financially troubled state. However he was not able to prevent the club's relegation from the 2022 Chinese Super League.

On 28 December 2024, Rong held the retirement game with his former teammates Li Xuepeng and Feng Xiaoting in Shandong Linyi Olympic Park.

== International career ==
Rong made his international debut on 1 June 2009 in a 1-0 friendly win against Iran at Qinhuangdao. After several further friendlies, he then established himself as the first-choice left back under then manager Gao Hongbo and won the 2010 East Asian Football Championship with the national team before being called up to China's squad for the 2011 AFC Asian Cup.

== Career statistics ==
=== Club statistics ===
As of 15 December 2022.

Appearances and goals by club, season and competition
Club	Season	League			National Cup		Continental		Other		Total	
Club	Season	Division	Apps	Goals	Apps	Goals	Apps	Goals	Apps	Goals	Apps	Goals
Wuhan Guanggu	2006	Chinese Super League	6	1	0	0	-		-		6	1
Wuhan Guanggu	2007	Chinese Super League	15	0	-		-		-		15	0
Wuhan Guanggu	2008	Chinese Super League	12	0	-		-		-		12	0
Wuhan Guanggu	Total		33	1	0	0	0	0	0	0	33	1
Jiangsu Sainty	2009	Chinese Super League	26	0	-		-		-		26	0
Hangzhou Greentown	2010	Chinese Super League	29	0	-		-		-		29	0
Hangzhou Greentown	2011	Chinese Super League	21	0	0	0	4	0	-		25	0
Hangzhou Greentown	Total		50	0	0	0	4	0	0	0	54	0
Guangzhou Evergrande	2012	Chinese Super League	3	0	3	0	2	0	0 (Note: Appearances in Chinese FA Super Cup)	0	8	0
Guangzhou Evergrande	2013	Chinese Super League	25	2	3	0	12	0	3 (Note: Appearances in FIFA Club World Cup)	0	43	2
Guangzhou Evergrande	2014	Chinese Super League	18	2	2	0	7	0	0	0	27	2
Guangzhou Evergrande	2015	Chinese Super League	9	0	1	0	4	0	1	0	15	0
Guangzhou Evergrande	2016	Chinese Super League	12	0	1	0	4	0	0	0	17	0
Guangzhou Evergrande	2017	Chinese Super League	4	0	1	0	0	0	0	0	5	0
Guangzhou Evergrande	Total		71	4	11	0	29	0	4	0	115	4
Shanghai Shenhua (loan)	2018	Chinese Super League	22	1	1	0	0	0	0	0	23	1
Tianjin Teda (loan)	2019	Chinese Super League	24	0	1	1	-		-		25	1
Tianjin Teda (loan)	2020	Chinese Super League	11	3	1	0	-		-		12	3
Tianjin Teda (loan)	Total		35	3	2	1	0	0	0	0	37	4
Wuhan Three Towns	2021	China League One	18	3	0	0	-		-		18	3
Zhejiang FC	2022	Chinese Super League	1	0	0	0	-		-		1	0
Guangzhou FC	2022	Chinese Super League	15	0	0	0	-		-		15	0
Career total			271	12	14	1	33	0	4	0	322	13

=== International statistics ===
National team
Year	Apps	Goals
2009	10	0
2010	15	0
2011	9	0
2012	0	0
2013	6	0
2014	2	0
2015	0	0
2016	1	0
Total	43	0

== Honours ==
=== Club ===
Guangzhou Evergrande

- Chinese Super League: 2012, 2013, 2014, 2015, 2016, 2017
- AFC Champions League: 2013, 2015
- Chinese FA Cup: 2012, 2016
- Chinese FA Super Cup: 2016, 2017, 2018

Wuhan Three Towns

- China League One: 2021

=== International ===
China PR national football team

- East Asian Football Championship: 2010
