= Li Jianbin =

Chinese footballer

Li Jianbin 李建滨
Personal information
- Full name: Li Jianbin
- Date of birth: 19 April 1989 (age 37)
- Place of birth: Binzhou, Shandong, China
- Height: 1.84 m (6 ft 0 in)
- Position: Defender

Team information
- Current team: Shanghai Second
- Number: 32

Youth career
- 2001–2005: Qingdao Beilaite
- 2006: Shanghai Stars
- 2006–2007: Qingdao Hailifeng

Senior career*
Years	Team	Apps	(Gls)
2008–2011	Chengdu Blades	49	(1)
2008–2009	→ Sheffield United HK (loan)	5	(1)
2012–2014	Guangzhou Evergrande	1	(0)
2013	→ Shanghai Shenhua (loan)	26	(0)
2014	→ Henan Jianye (loan)	7	(0)
2015–2018	Shanghai Shenhua	59	(2)
2019–2020	Dalian Professional	17	(1)
2021–2022	Chengdu Rongcheng	13	(0)
2023–	Shanghai Second	0	(0)

International career
2010	China U–23	3	(1)
- * Club domestic league appearances and goals as of 21:11, 8 January 2023 (UTC)

Li Jianbin (Chinese: 李建滨; pinyin: Lǐ Jiànbīn; Mandarin pronunciation: [lì tɕjɛ̂n.pín]; born 19 April 1989) is a Chinese professional footballer who plays for China League Two club Shanghai Second.

== Club career ==
=== Early career ===
Li Jianbin started his football career playing for Qingdao Beilaite's youth academy in 2001 and showed great athleticism that would attract the interests of second tier side Shanghai Stars in 2006. He would not break into the first team and decided to move to fellow second tier side Qingdao Hailifeng where he once again spent most of his time playing for their youth academy.

=== Chengdu Blades ===
Li joined second tier side Chengdu Blades in May 2007 and would soon be sent to play for the club's satellite team Hong Kong First Division League side Sheffield United where he played five games and scored one goal. On his return from his loan period, Chengdu had become a top tier side and Li would go on to make his debut for the club on 5 July 2009 in a league game against Shandong Luneng which ended in a 2-1 win. Then manager Wang Baoshan would show a lot of faith in the young player and allowed him to feature within nine more league games at the end of the season. The next season saw the club relegated to the second tier when it was discovered that the club match-fixed several games in 2007 when they were promoted. Li would decide to remain faithful towards the club and decided to concentrate in establishing himself as a vital member within the team. He achieved this by playing in twenty-two league games and helped guide the club to second place within the league as well as immediate promotion back to the Chinese Super League.

=== Guangzhou Evergrande ===
Li transferred to Guangzhou Evergrande on 26 December 2011 along with Zhao Xuri, Rong Hao, and Peng Xinli. He made his debut for the club on 11 May 2012 in a 3-1 away defeat against Dalian Shide. Li failed to establish himself within the first team and played mostly in the reserve team league for the club. He made just one league appearance for Guangzhou in the 2012 league season.

On 20 November 2012, Li was loaned to Shanghai Shenhua for the 2013 league season as part of an agreement for Feng Renliang's transfer to Guangzhou Evergrande with an option to buy at the end of the season. He returned to Guangzhou Evergrande in the beginning of 2014 season and played as a starter in the 2014 Chinese FA Super Cup. However, after Guangzhou losing the match, he had a conflict with fans in the social networks and was sent to the reserve team. On 25 June 2014, Li was loaned to promoted side Henan Jianye for the rest of the 2014 season. He made his debut for the club on 20 July 2014 in a 2-1 win against Beijing Guoan.

=== Shanghai Shenhua ===
On 4 December 2014, Li joined fellow Chinese Super League side Shanghai Shenhua on a permanent transfer after failing to cement a starting role at Guangzhou Evergrande. On 8 March 2015, he made his debut for the club in a 6-2 win against Shanghai Shenxin. He scored his first goal for Shanghai on 3 July 2016, in a 3-0 victory against Changchun Yatai.

=== Later career ===
On 13 February 2019, Li transferred to Dalian Professional. He would make his debut in a league game on 3 March 2019 against Henan Jianye in a 1-1 draw.

The following season Li was moved to the reserve team and he was allowed to leave for second tier club Chengdu Rongcheng, where he made his debut in a league game on 11 August 2021 against Xinjiang Tianshan Leopard in a 6-0 victory. He would go on to establish himself as a vital part of the team as the club gained promotion to the top tier at the end of the 2021 league campaign.

== International career ==
Li was called up to the Chinese under-23 national team to take part in the 2010 Asian Games where he would play in three games and score one goal in a tournament in which China were knocked out in the last sixteen. Several months later after an impressive league season where Li established himself and won promotion with Chengdu Blades, he would soon be called up to the Chinese national team preliminary squad in preparation for the 2011 AFC Asian Cup. Despite having no previous senior international experience and having played for a second tier side, Li was unexpectedly included into the squad after teammate Feng Xiaoting was injured and would go on to make his unofficial international debut against Iraq on 2 January 2011 which China won 3-2.

== Career statistics ==
As of 8 January 2023.

Appearances and goals by club, season and competition
Club	Season	League			National Cup		League Cup		Continental		Other		Total	
Club	Season	Division	Apps	Goals	Apps	Goals	Apps	Goals	Apps	Goals	Apps	Goals	Apps	Goals
Chengdu Blades	2008	Chinese Super League	0	0	-	-	-	-	-	-	-	-	0	0
Chengdu Blades	2009	Chinese Super League	10	0	-	-	-	-	-	-	-	-	10	0
Chengdu Blades	2010	China League One	22	0	-	-	-	-	-	-	-	-	22	0
Chengdu Blades	2011	Chinese Super League	17	1	0	0	-	-	-	-	-	-	17	1
Chengdu Blades	Total		49	1	0	0	0	0	0	0	0	0	49	1
Sheffield United HK (loan)	2008–09	Hong Kong First Division League	5	1	0	0	0	0	-	-	2 (Note: Appearances in Hong Kong Senior Challenge Shield)	1	7	2
Guangzhou Evergrande	2012	Chinese Super League	1	0	0	0	-	-	0	0	0	0	1	0
Guangzhou Evergrande	2014	Chinese Super League	0	0	0	0	-	-	0	0	1 (Note: Appearances in Chinese FA Super Cup)	0	1	0
Guangzhou Evergrande	Total		1	0	0	0	0	0	0	0	1	0	2	0
Shanghai Shenhua (loan)	2013	Chinese Super League	26	0	1	0	-	-	-	-	-	-	27	0
Henan Jianye (loan)	2014	Chinese Super League	7	0	1	0	-	-	-	-	-	-	8	0
Shanghai Shenhua	2015	Chinese Super League	26	0	7	0	-	-	-	-	-	-	33	0
Shanghai Shenhua	2016	Chinese Super League	19	2	3	0	-	-	-	-	-	-	22	2
Shanghai Shenhua	2017	Chinese Super League	10	0	2	0	-	-	0	0	-	-	12	0
Shanghai Shenhua	2018	Chinese Super League	4	0	0	0	-	-	2	0	1	0	7	0
Shanghai Shenhua	Total		59	2	12	0	0	0	2	0	1	0	74	2
Dalian Professional	2019	Chinese Super League	17	1	2	0	-	-	-	-	-	-	19	1
Dalian Professional	2020	Chinese Super League	0	0	0	0	-	-	-	-	-	-	0	0
Dalian Professional	Total		17	1	2	0	0	0	0	0	0	0	19	1
Chengdu Rongcheng	2021	China League One	9	0	1	0	-	-	-	-	0 (Note: Appearance(s) in CSL Relegation play-offs)	0	10	0
Chengdu Rongcheng	2022	Chinese Super League	4	0	1	0	-	-	-	-	-	-	5	0
Chengdu Rongcheng	Total		13	0	2	0	0	0	0	0	0	0	15	1
Career total			177	5	18	0	0	0	2	0	4	1	201	6

== Honours ==
=== Club ===
Guangzhou Evergrande

- Chinese Super League: 2012
- Chinese FA Super Cup: 2012
- Chinese FA Cup: 2012
