= Yang Jun (footballer) =

Chinese footballer (born 1981)

Yang Jun 杨君
Personal information
- Full name: Yang Jun
- Date of birth: 10 June 1981 (age 45)
- Place of birth: Tianjin, China
- Height: 1.87 m (6 ft 2 in)
- Position: Goalkeeper

Youth career
- 1997: Tianjin Locomotive
- 1999–2000: Qingdao Yizhong Hainiu

Senior career*
Years	Team	Apps	(Gls)
2001–2006	Qingdao Jonoon	65	(0)
2005	→ Changchun Yatai (loan)	6	(0)
2006	→ Beijing Guoan (loan)	4	(0)
2007–2009	Tianjin Teda	87	(0)
2011–2013	Guangzhou Evergrande	40	(0)
2014	Shenyang Zhongze	28	(0)
2015–2018	Tianjin Quanjian	21	(0)

International career^{‡}
2001	China U-20		
2002	China U-23		
2002–2009	China	4	(0)
- * Club domestic league appearances and goals as of 11 November 2018 ‡ National team caps and goals as of 15 October 2013

Yang Jun (Chinese: 杨君; pinyin: Yáng Jūn; born 10 June 1981 in Tianjin) is a Chinese retired footballer who played as goalkeeper.

== Club career ==
Yang Jun was considered an outstanding young talented goalkeeper and was quickly spotted by the Chinese youth system before top tier side Qingdao Yizhong Hainiu took him into their side and promoted him into their senior side by the 2001 league season. At Qingdao, who had changed their name to Qingdao Jonoon, he would not have to wait long before he would establish himself as a team regular by the end of the 2002 league season when he made twenty league appearances at the end of the season. For the next several seasons, he was the club's first choice goalkeeper until he was willing to join high flying second tier club Changchun Yatai and immediately win promotion for them, however he was unable to establish himself within the team and was loaned out to Beijing Guoan but the subsequent move was unsuccessful and he only played four games for them.

Changchun Yatai were willing to let Yang Jun go and he would transfer to top tier side Tianjin Teda at the beginning of the 2007 league season where he was immediately chosen as the club's first choice goalkeeper as well as quickly becoming a prominent member of the team. The next season would see him have his most successful season with the club when in the 2008 league season he would aid the club to a top four finish and qualification for the AFC Champions League for the first time. The 2009 AFC Champions League was not successful for the club and while he played in the first four games of the groups stages he was rested for the remaining two after the team could not progress, however Yang still played in every league game throughout the season and even captained the team during absence of club captain Wang Xiao for a short period. At the end of the season the team finished in a disappointing sixth and the club were willing to let Yang go, however they could not find a buyer and as with his teammate Han Yanming the club stopped paying his wages so Yang went to his old club Tianjin Locomotive to train on his fitness. Yang later signed for Guangzhou Evergrande before the 2011 season.

Yang played understudy to Li Shuai in the first half of 2011 season. On 12 May 2011, Yang made his debut for Guangzhou Evergrande in the second round of 2011 Chinese FA Cup as a substitute for Li Shuai in the final minutes, hoping to make impress in the penalty shootout. However, Guangzhou finally lost to Shaanxi Renhe 12–11. Yang gained his Super League debut on 29 May 2011 after Li Shuai suffered injury in the match against Changchun Yatai. He performed well during Li Shuai's absence and when the Li returned from injury, Yang kept his place for Guangzhou Evergrande and helped the club win their first Super League champions in the 2011 season. His position was threaten by Li Shuai after Italian manager Marcello Lippi took charge the club. He became the second choice goalkeeper in September 2012 and the third choice goalkeeper in the 2013 season after Chinese international Zeng Cheng joined the club.

In February 2014, Yang transferred to China League One side Shenyang Zhongze on a free transfer. In February 2015, Yang moved to another League One club Tianjin Songjiang after Shenyang Zhongze dissolved.

== International career ==
Yang won his first cap for Chinese national team on 7 December 2002, in an international friendly against Syria. He was selected for the Chinese national team in the 2007 AFC Asian Cup where he played understudy to Li Leilei. He played one game in the tournament for China in 2007 against Uzbekistan which China lost 3–0, effectively knocking China out of the tournament.

== Career statistics ==
Statistics accurate as of match played 11 November 2018

Club performance			League		Cup		League Cup		Continental		Total	
Season	Club	League	Apps	Goals	Apps	Goals	Apps	Goals	Apps	Goals	Apps	Goals
2001	Qingdao Jonoon	Jia-A League	0	0		0	-		-		0	0
2002	Qingdao Jonoon	Jia-A League	20	0		0	-			0	20	0
2003	Qingdao Jonoon	Jia-A League	26	0		0	-		-		26	0
2004	Qingdao Jonoon	Chinese Super League	19	0		0		0	-		19	0
2005	Changchun Yatai (Loan)	China League One	6	0		0		0	-		6	0
2006	Beijing Guoan (Loan)	Chinese Super League	4	0		0	-		-		4	0
2007	Tianjin Teda	Chinese Super League	28	0	-		-		-		28	0
2008	Tianjin Teda	Chinese Super League	29	0	-		-		-		29	0
2009	Tianjin Teda	Chinese Super League	30	0	-		-		4	0	34	0
2011	Guangzhou Evergrande	Chinese Super League	20	0	1	0	-		-		21	0
2012	Guangzhou Evergrande	Chinese Super League	20	0	0	0	-		7	0	27	0
2013	Guangzhou Evergrande	Chinese Super League	0	0	0	0	-		0	0	0	0
2014	Shenyang Zhongze	China League One	28	0	0	0	-		-		28	0
2015	Tianjin Quanjian	China League One	21	0	0	0	-		-		21	0
2016	Tianjin Quanjian	China League One	0	0	2	0	-		-		2	0
2017	Tianjin Quanjian	Chinese Super League	0	0	0	0	-		-		0	0
2018	Tianjin Quanjian	Chinese Super League	0	0	0	0	-		0	0	0	0
Total	China PR		251	0	3	0	0	0	11	0	265	0

== Honours ==
Qingdao Jonoon

- Chinese FA Cup: 2002

Guangzhou Evergrande

- Chinese Super League: 2011, 2012, 2013
- Chinese FA Cup: 2012
- Chinese FA Super Cup: 2012
- AFC Champions League: 2013

Tianjin Quanjian F.C.

- China League One: 2016
