= Chen Zijie =

Chinese footballer (born 1989)

Chen Zijie 陈子介
Personal information
- Full name: Chen Zijie
- Date of birth: 24 December 1989 (age 36)
- Place of birth: Xi'an, Shaanxi, China
- Height: 1.85 m (6 ft 1 in)
- Positions: Striker; winger

Youth career
- Shaanxi National Power
- 2007–2008: Shaanxi Baorong Chanba

Senior career*
Years	Team	Apps	(Gls)
2008	Shaanxi Star		
2009–2014	Guizhou Renhe	23	(2)
2011–2012	→ Shanghai East Asia (loan)	33	(3)
2013	→ Hebei Zhongji (loan)	7	(0)
2015–2016	Hunan Billows	37	(6)
2017–2019	Henan Jianye	17	(0)
2018	→ Shenyang Urban (loan)	24	(4)
2020	Qinghai Oulu International		
2021	Shaanxi Warriors Beyond	20	(4)
2022	Zibo Qisheng	7	(1)
2022	Zhuhai Qin'ao	4	(3)
2023	Xian Ronghai	0	(0)

International career^{‡}
2014	China	2	(0)
- * Club domestic league appearances and goals as of 6 May 2022 ‡ National team caps and goals as of 2 November 2014

Chen Zijie (Chinese: 陈子介; pinyin: Chén Zǐjiè; born 24 December 1989) is a Chinese football coach and former footballer.

== Club career ==
Chen Zijie began his football career when he played for Shaanxi Guoli's youth team and in 2007, he moved to Shaanxi Baorong Chanba's youth team after his previous club dissolved. He was then loaned to China League Two club Shaanxi Star for one season. Chen was promoted to Shaanxi Baorong Chanba (later moved to Guizhou and renamed Guizhou Renhe)'s first team squad by Cheng Yaodong in 2009, however, as Shaanxi struggled at the bottom of the league, he did not appear for the club in the 2009 league season.

Chen was loaned to China League One club Shanghai East Asia for the 2011 season. Although he just made ten appearances in the league, Shanghai East Asia extended his loan deal for an additional year in 2012. On 8 April 2012, he scored his first goal for Shanghai East Asia in a 2–0 home victory against Yanbian Changbai Tiger. He played 25 matches and scored three goals in the second tier that season as Shanghai East Asia won the 2012 China League One titles and were promoted to the top flight. Chen returned to Guizhou after 2012 league season, but in July 2013, he was loaned to third-tier side Hebei Zhongji until 31 December 2013.

On 16 February 2014, Chen made his debut for Guizhou in the 2014 Chinese FA Super Cup against Guangzhou Evergrande with 1–0 victory, coming on as a substitute for the injured Zlatan Muslimović in the 59th minute. His first tier debut came on 8 March 2014, in the first league match of the season in a goalless away draw against Jiangsu Sainty. On 15 March 2014, he scored his first goal for Guizhou in a 2–0 home win over Tianjin Teda.

On 7 February 2015, Chen signed a four-year contract with China League One side Hunan Billows. In February 2017, he transferred to Super League side Henan Jianye after Hunan relegated to the third tier. He made his debut for Henan on 7 April 2017 in a 1–0 away defeat against Beijing Guoan, coming on as a substitute for Christian Bassogog in the 75th minute. On 3 May 2017, he scored his first goal for the club in a 5–1 away win against League Two club Shanghai Sunfun in the 2017 Chinese FA Cup.

== International career ==
Chen made his debut for the Chinese national team on 18 June 2014 in a 2-0 win against Macedonia.

== Career statistics ==
Statistics accurate as of match played 31 December 2019.

Club	Season	League			National Cup		Continental		Other		Total	
Club	Season	Division	Apps	Goals	Apps	Goals	Apps	Goals	Apps	Goals	Apps	Goals
Shaanxi Star	2008	China League Two			-		-		-			
Shaanxi Baorong Chanba/Guizhou Renhe	2009	Chinese Super League	0	0	-		-		-		0	0
Shaanxi Baorong Chanba/Guizhou Renhe	2010	Chinese Super League	0	0	-		-		-		0	0
Shaanxi Baorong Chanba/Guizhou Renhe	2013	Chinese Super League	0	0	0	0	-		0 (Note: Appearances in Chinese FA Super Cup)	0	0	0
Shaanxi Baorong Chanba/Guizhou Renhe	2014	Chinese Super League	23	2	2	0	5	2	1	0	31	4
Shaanxi Baorong Chanba/Guizhou Renhe	Total		23	2	2	0	5	2	1	0	31	4
Shanghai East Asia (loan)	2011	China League One	8	0	1	0	-		-		9	0
Shanghai East Asia (loan)	2012	China League One	25	3	2	1	-		-		27	4
Shanghai East Asia (loan)	Total		33	3	3	1	0	0	0	0	36	4
Hebei Zhongji (loan)	2013	China League Two	7	0	0	0	-		-		7	0
Hunan Billows	2015	China League One	27	5	1	0	-		-		28	5
Hunan Billows	2016	China League One	10	1	0	0	-		-		10	1
Hunan Billows	Total		37	6	1	0	0	0	0	0	38	6
Henan Jianye	2017	Chinese Super League	17	0	2	2	-		-		19	2
Shenyang Urban (loan)	2018	China League Two	22	4	4	0	-		2 (Note: Appearances in 2018 China League Two promotion play-offs)	0	28	4
Career total			139	15	12	3	5	2	3	0	159	20

== Honours ==
=== Club ===
Shanghai East Asia

- China League One: 2012

Guizhou Renhe

- Chinese FA Super Cup: 2014
