= Luo Jiacheng =

Chinese association football player

Personal information
- Date of birth: 5 January 1995 (age 31)
- Place of birth: Guangzhou, Guangdong, China
- Height: 1.76 m (5 ft 9 in)
- Position: Midfielder

Team information
- Current team: Guangdong Red Treasure

Youth career
- 2013–2017: Guangzhou Evergrande

Senior career*
Years	Team	Apps	(Gls)
2014	Guangzhou Evergrande	0	(0)
2018–2019	Kunshan	17	(0)
2020-2021	Tak Chun Ka I		
2021	Maoming Oil City		
2021	Shenzhen Bogang		
2022-	Guangdong Red Treasure	0	(0)
- * Club domestic league appearances and goals as of 14:01, 17 May 2022 (UTC)

Luo Jiacheng (Chinese: 骆嘉诚; born 5 January 1995) is a Chinese footballer who currently plays as a midfielder for Chinese club a Guangdong Red Treasure.

== Career statistics ==
=== Club ===
As of 1 February 2020.

Club	Season	League			National Cup		Continental		Other		Total	
Club	Season	Division	Apps	Goals	Apps	Goals	Apps	Goals	Apps	Goals	Apps	Goals
Guangzhou Evergrande	2014	Chinese Super League	0	0	0	0	0	0	1 (Note: Appearances in Chinese FA Super Cup)	0	1	0
Kunshan	2018	China League Two	15	0	2	1	–		2 (Note: Appearances in the China League Two play/offs)	0	19	1
Kunshan	2019	China League Two	0	0	0	0	–		–		0	0
Kunshan	Total		15	0	2	1	0	0	3	0	20	1
Career total			15	0	2	1	0	0	3	0	20	1
