= Li Shuai (footballer, born 1982) =

Chinese footballer

Li Shuai 李帅
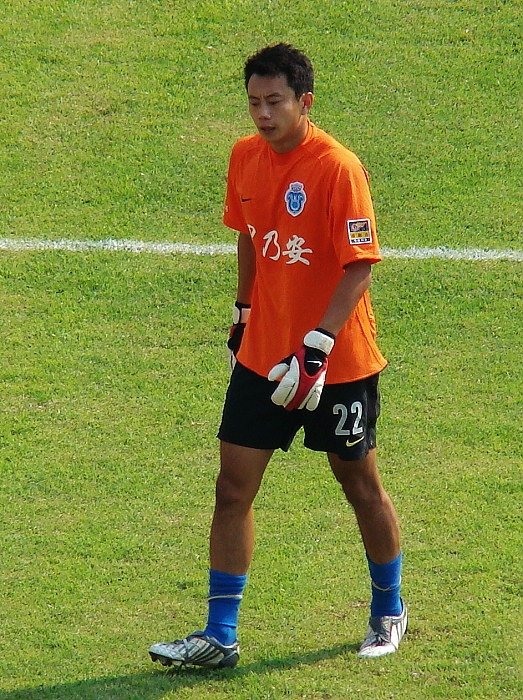
- Li with Guangzhou in 2009

Personal information
- Full name: Li Shuai
- Date of birth: 18 August 1982 (age 44)
- Place of birth: Qingdao, Shandong, China
- Height: 1.90 m (6 ft 3 in)
- Position: Goalkeeper

Team information
- Current team: China U19 (goalkeeping coach)

Youth career
- 1997–2001: Qingdao Hainiu

Senior career*
Years	Team	Apps	(Gls)
2002–2006	Qingdao Jonoon	40	(0)
2007–2015	Guangzhou Evergrande Taobao	137	(0)
2016–2021	Shanghai Shenhua	105	(0)

Managerial career
- 2022–2025: Shanghai Shenhua (goalkeeping)
- 2023–2024: China U23 (goalkeeping)
- 2026–: China U19 (goalkeeping)
Medal record
Men's football
Representing China
East Asian Games
Gold medal – first place	2001 Macau	Football
- * Club domestic league appearances and goals

Li Shuai (simplified Chinese: 李帅; traditional Chinese: 李帥; pinyin: Li Shuài, born 18 August 1982) is a Chinese former professional footballer who played as a goalkeeper.

== Club career ==
Li Shuai started his football career playing for Qingdao Jonoon's youth academy. In the 2002 season, Li was promoted to the first team and made his debut on 1 September 2002 in a 4-1 loss against Beijing Guoan. After several seasons as the backup goalkeeper, Li would start to rise to prominence by playing in 23 league games during the 2005 season as he established himself as the first-choice goalkeeper. The following season for Li was to prove unsuccessful with Qingdao as they flirted with relegation. He also found himself playing a significantly smaller role within the team by playing in only thirteen games within the season.

At the start of the 2007 season, Li transferred to second tier side Guangzhou GPC. After only one season with the team, he quickly established himself as the first-choice goalkeeper and saw Guangzhou immediately promoted to the top tier after winning the second tier title. Within the top tier again, Li would make sure the club were midtable regulars for the next several seasons until the club were relegated for match-fixing at the end of the 2009 season which occurred in 2006 before he joined the club. Despite this, Li remained loyal towards the club and he went on to make his 100th appearance for Guangzhou on 18 September 2010 in a 2-1 win against Yanbian FC. He became the club's second-choice goalkeeper after June 2011. He was linked with fellow Chinese Super League side Shanghai Shenhua at the end of the 2014 season; however, he decided to stay in Guangzhou and signed a one-year extension with an option to a second year with the club on 19 November 2014.

On 19 January 2016, Li transferred to Shanghai Shenhua. He made his debut for the club on 5 March 2016 in a 1-1 draw against Yanbian Fude. Li played 29 league matches in the 2016 season as the club won qualification to the AFC Champions League for the first time since 2011. He received a special contribution award from the club along with Obafemi Martins on 2 November 2016 for the season he had with the club. For the next several seasons he would be an integral member of the team that won the 2017 and 2019 Chinese FA Cup's. On 3 March 2022 Li decided to officially retire from professional football at the age of 39 and move into coaching. On 31 December 2025, Li announced his departure after the 10 years career in Shenhua.

In January 2026, Li joined China U19 as goalkeeping coach.

== Career statistics ==
Appearances and goals by club, season and competition
Club	Season	League			National Cup		League Cup		Continental		Other		Total	
Club	Season	Division	Apps	Goals	Apps	Goals	Apps	Goals	Apps	Goals	Apps	Goals	Apps	Goals
Qingdao Jonoon	2002	Chinese Jia-A League	1	0	0	0	-		-		-		1	0
Qingdao Jonoon	2003	Chinese Jia-A League	0	0	0	0	-		-		-		0	0
Qingdao Jonoon	2004	Chinese Super League	3	0	5	0	2	0	-		-		10	0
Qingdao Jonoon	2005	Chinese Super League	23	0	1	0	4	0	-		-		28	0
Qingdao Jonoon	2006	Chinese Super League	13	0	1	0	-		-		-		14	0
Qingdao Jonoon	Total		40	0	7	0	6	0	0	0	0	0	53	0
Guangzhou Evergrande	2007	China League One	21	0	-		-		-		-		21	0
Guangzhou Evergrande	2008	Chinese Super League	30	0	-		-		-		-		30	0
Guangzhou Evergrande	2009	Chinese Super League	29	0	-		-		-		-		29	0
Guangzhou Evergrande	2010	China League One	24	0	-		-		-		-		24	0
Guangzhou Evergrande	2011	Chinese Super League	11	0	2	0	-		-		-		13	0
Guangzhou Evergrande	2012	Chinese Super League	10	0	6	0	-		2	0	-		18	0
Guangzhou Evergrande	2013	Chinese Super League	3	0	2	0	-		0	0	1 (Note: Appearances in FIFA Club World Cup)	0	6	0
Guangzhou Evergrande	2014	Chinese Super League	4	0	2	0	-		0	0	0 (Note: Appearances in Chinese FA Super Cup)	0	6	0
Guangzhou Evergrande	2015	Chinese Super League	5	0	1	0	-		5	0	3	0	14	0
Guangzhou Evergrande	Total		137	0	13	0	0	0	7	0	4	0	161	0
Shanghai Shenhua	2016	Chinese Super League	29	0	2	0	-		-		-		31	0
Shanghai Shenhua	2017	Chinese Super League	27	0	7	0	-		1	0	-		35	0
Shanghai Shenhua	2018	Chinese Super League	25	0	1	0	-		5	0	1	0	32	0
Shanghai Shenhua	2019	Chinese Super League	12	0	3	0	-		-		-		15	0
Shanghai Shenhua	2020	Chinese Super League	2	0	1	0	-		6	0	-		9	0
Shanghai Shenhua	2021	Chinese Super League	10	0	0	0	-		-		-		10	0
Shanghai Shenhua	Total		105	0	14	0	0	0	12	0	1	0	132	0
Career total			281	0	34	0	6	0	19	0	5	0	346	0

== Honours ==
=== Club ===
Guangzhou Evergrande

- Chinese Super League: 2011, 2012, 2013, 2014, 2015
- China League One: 2007, 2010
- Chinese FA Cup: 2012
- Chinese FA Super Cup: 2012
- AFC Champions League: 2013, 2015

Shanghai Shenhua

- Chinese FA Cup: 2017, 2019
