= 2018 Shanghai Greenland Shenhua F.C. season =

Shanghai Shenhua
- Chairman: Wu Xiaohui
- Manager: Wu Jingui
- Stadium: Hongkou Football Stadium
- Super League: 7th
- FA Cup: Fourth round
- Super Cup: Runners-up
- AFC Champions League: Group stage
- Top goalscorer: League: Fredy Guarín (7 goals); All: Fredy Guarín (9 goals)
- Highest home attendance: 23,928 vs Shanghai SIPG; 10 March 2018
- Lowest home attendance: 20,012 vs Shandong Luneng Taishan; 11 November 2018
- Average home league attendance: 21,476
Home colours	Away colours

The 2018 Shanghai Greenland Shenhua season was Shanghai Greenland Shenhua's 15th season in the Chinese Super League and 56th overall in the Chinese top flight. In addition to the domestic league, the club also competed in the Chinese FA Cup, Chinese FA Super Cup and AFC Champions League.

== Squad ==
=== First team squad ===
As of 13 July 2018

Note: Flags indicate national team as defined under FIFA eligibility rules; some limited exceptions apply. Players may hold more than one non-FIFA nationality.

No.	Pos.	Nation	Player
2	DF	CHN	Xu Yougang
3	DF	CHN	Li Jianbin
4	DF	CHN	Jiang Shenglong^{SU}
5	DF	CHN	Zhu Chenjie^{SU}
6	DF	CHN	Li Peng
7	FW	CHN	Mao Jianqing
8	MF	CHN	Zhang Lu
9	FW	SEN	Demba Ba^{SU}
10	MF	COL	Giovanni Moreno (Captain)
11	MF	PAR	Óscar Romero^{NA}
12	GK	CHN	Chen Zhao
13	MF	COL	Fredy Guarín
14	DF	CHN	Sun Kai
15	FW	CHN	Zhu Jianrong
16	DF	CHN	Li Yunqiu
18	FW	CHN	Gao Di

No.	Pos.	Nation	Player
19	DF	CHN	Li Xiaoming
20	MF	CHN	Wang Yun
21	MF	CHN	Xu Haoyang^{SU}
22	GK	CHN	Qiu Shengjiong
23	DF	CHN	Bai Jiajun
24	DF	CHN	Rong Hao^{NA} (on loan from Guangzhou Evergrande Taobao)
25	DF	CHN	Wang Lin
27	GK	CHN	Li Shuai
28	MF	CHN	Cao Yunding
29	MF	CHN	Zhou Junchen^{SU}
31	MF	CHN	Wang Wei
32	DF	CHN	Aidi Fulangxisi
36	MF	CHN	Liu Ruofan
37	MF	CHN	Sun Shilin
39	MF	CHN	Cong Zhen

Remarks:
^{NA} These players are not registered for the group stage of 2018 AFC Champions League but eligible to play at Chinese domestic football competitions.
^{SU} These players are eligible to play at Chinese domestic football competitions after mid-season transfer window summer 2018.

Source：

=== Reserve squad ===
Note: Flags indicate national team as defined under FIFA eligibility rules; some limited exceptions apply. Players may hold more than one non-FIFA nationality.

No.	Pos.	Nation	Player
30	DF	CHN	Tao Jin ^{RE}
34	DF	CHN	Bi Jinhao ^{RE}
35	MF	CHN	Lü Pin ^{RE}
41	MF	CHN	Li Lianxiang
42	DF	CHN	Gong Jinshuai
43	MF	CHN	Xu Jun
44	FW	CHN	Gao Shipeng
45	DF	CHN	Yang Haofeng
46	MF	CHN	Pan Weihao
47	MF	CHN	Xie Jinzheng
48	MF	CHN	Chen Qiyuan
49	DF	CHN	Yan Xinyu
50	GK	CHN	Yu Qixuan

No.	Pos.	Nation	Player
51	MF	CHN	Zhan Yilin
53	MF	CHN	Chen Tao
54	FW	CHN	Sun Xipeng
55	GK	CHN	Shen Jun
56	DF	CHN	Cao Chuanyu
57	MF	CHN	Chen Xiaomao
58	MF	CHN	Leng Shiao
59	MF	CHN	Hu Jiali
60	MF	CHN	Wang Haijian
61	DF	CHN	Wang Jiahao ^{RE}
62	DF	CHN	Huang Linhao ^{RE}
63	DF	CHN	Guo Chen ^{RE}
64	GK	CHN	Peng Peng ^{RE}

Remarks:
^{RE} Registered for reserve squad after mid-season transfer window summer 2018.

=== Left club during season ===
Note: Flags indicate national team as defined under FIFA eligibility rules; some limited exceptions apply. Players may hold more than one non-FIFA nationality.

No.	Pos.	Nation	Player
17	FW	NGR	Obafemi Martins
26	MF	CHN	Qin Sheng
52	DF	CHN	Deng Biao

== Transfers and loans ==
=== Transfers in ===
When	Pos.	Player	Age	Moving from	Type	Transfer fee	Notes	Source
Winter	FW	(China) Wu Changqi	24	(China) Shanghai Sunfun	Loan return	Free	Reserve squad	
Winter	FW	(China) Gao Di	27	(China) Jiangsu Suning	Loan return	Free		
Winter	FW	(China) Gao Shipeng	24	(China) Shanghai JuJu Sports	Loan return	Free	Reserve squad	
Winter	MF	(China) Wang Yun	34	(China) Shanghai Shenxin	Loan return	Free		
Winter	MF	(China) Deng Zhuoxiang	29	(China) Qingdao Huanghai	Loan return	Free		
Winter	MF	(China) Xu Jun	22	(China) Shanghai JuJu Sports	Loan return	Free	Reserve squad	
Winter	MF	(China) Zhan Yilin	28	(China) Shanghai JuJu Sports	Loan return	Free	Reserve squad	
Winter	MF	(China) Wang Fei	28	(China) Shanghai JuJu Sports	Loan return	Free	Reserve squad	
Winter	MF	(China) Yan Xinyu	22	(China) Shanghai JuJu Sports	Loan return	Free	Reserve squad	
Winter	MF	(China) Leng Shiao	21	(China) Guizhou Hengfeng	Loan return	Free	Reserve squad	
Winter	MF	(Paraguay) Óscar Romero	25	(Spain) Alavés	Loan return	Free		
Winter	DF	(China) Li Xiaoming	21	(China) Shenzhen FC	Loan return	Free		
Winter	DF	(China) Zhou Jiahao	22	(China) Shanghai JuJu Sports	Loan return	Free	Reserve squad	
Winter	DF	(China) Zheng Kaimu	25	(China) Shijiazhuang Ever Bright	Loan return	Free		
Winter	DF	(China) Xu Yougang	21	(China) Qingdao Huanghai	Loan return	Free		
Winter	DF	(China) Gong Jinshuai	22	(China) Shanghai Sunfun	Loan return	Free	Reserve squad	
Winter	DF	(China) Deng Biao	22	(China) Shanghai JuJu Sports	Loan return	Free	Reserve squad	
Winter	DF	(China) Cao Chuanyu	22	(China) Shanghai JuJu Sports	Loan return	Free	Reserve squad	
Winter	DF	(China) Yang Haofeng	24	(China) Shanghai JuJu Sports	Loan return	Free	Reserve squad	
Winter	MF	(China) Li Lianxiang	24	(China) Shanghai JuJu Sports	Loan return	Free	Reserve squad	
Winter	GK	(China) Bai Shuo	22	(China) Shanghai JuJu Sports	Loan return	Free	Reserve squad	
Winter	DF	(China) Aidi Fulangxisi	27	(Portugal) Boavista	Transfer	Free		
Summer	FW	(Senegal) Demba Ba	33	(Turkey) Göztepe	Transfer	Undisclosed		

=== Transfers out ===
When	Pos.	Player	Age	Moving to	Type	Transfer fee	Notes	Source
Winter	FW	(Argentina) Carlos Tevez	33	(Argentina) Boca Juniors	Contract terminated	Undisclosed	Mutual consent	
Winter	DF	(China) Xiong Fei	30	(China) Liaoning FC	Released	Free	End of contract	
Winter	DF	(China) Zhou Jiahao	22	(China) Shijiazhuang Ever Bright	Transfer	Undisclosed	After returning from loan	
Winter	FW	(Senegal) Demba Ba	32	(Turkey) Göztepe	Transfer	Free		
Winter	MF	(China) Wang Fei	28	(China) Qingdao Huanghai	Released	Free	End of contract, after returning from loan	
Winter	DF	(China) Zheng Kaimu	26	(China) Guizhou Hengfeng	Transfer	Undisclosed	After returning from loan	
Winter	DF	(South Korea) Kim Kee-hee	28	(United States) Seattle Sounders FC	Transfer	Undisclosed		
Winter	DF	(China) Cheng Rui	20	(China) Qingdao Huanghai	Transfer	Undisclosed		
Winter	MF	(China) Deng Zhuoxiang	29	(China) Beijing Enterprises	Released	Free	End of contract, after returning from loan	
Winter	FW	(China) Lü Zheng	33	(China) Beijing Enterprises	Released	Free	End of contract	
Winter	MF	(China) Xu Junmin	23	(China) Shanghai Shenxin	Transfer	Undisclosed		
Winter	GK	(China) Bai Shuo	23	(China) Baotou Nanjiao	Transfer	Undisclosed	After returning from loan	
Summer	FW	(Nigeria) Obafemi Martins	33		Contract terminated	Free	Mutual consent	

=== Loans in ===
No	Pos.	Player	Age	Loaned from	Start	End	Source
24	DF	(China) Rong Hao	30	(China) Guangzhou Evergrande Taobao	28 February 2018	End of season	

=== Loans out ===
No	Pos.	Player	Age	Loaned to	Start	End	Source
-	DF	(Hong Kong) Brian Fok	23	(Uruguay) Juventud de Las Piedras	21 February 2018	30 June 2018	
-	MF	(China) Wang Shouting	32	(China) Shanghai Shenxin	28 February 2018	30 June 2018	
-	MF	(China) Liu Jiawei	24	(China) Xinjiang Tianshan Leopard	1 March 2018	End of season	
-	DF	(China) Tang Qiheng	18	(China) Shanghai Sunfun	10 March 2018	End of season	
-	MF	(China) Zhang Yuhao	21	(China) Baotou Nanjiao	13 March 2018	End of season	
-	MF	(China) Cui Qi	25	(China) Baotou Nanjiao	13 March 2018	End of season	
26	MF	(China) Qin Sheng	31	(China) Dalian Yifang	21 June 2018	End of season	
-	MF	(China) Wang Shouting	32	(China) Changchun Yatai	8 July 2018	End of season	
52	DF	(China) Deng Biao	22	(China) Xinjiang Tianshan Leopard	12 July 2018	End of season	
-	FW	(China) Yan Ge	24	(China) Baotou Nanjiao	13 July 2018	End of season	
-	DF	(Hong Kong) Brian Fok	24	(Portugal) Académico de Viseu	14 August 2018	30 June 2019	

== Friendlies ==
=== Preseason ===
10 January 2018 Friendly	Eintracht Braunschweig (Germany)	2–2	(China) Shanghai Greenland Shenhua	Coín, Spain
15:30 (UTC+1)	Abdullahi 15'; Breitkreuz 105'		Jianrong 3', 9'	Stadium: Estadio José Burgos Quintana

12 January 2018 Friendly	Partick Thistle (Scotland)	2–1	(China) Shanghai Greenland Shenhua	Coín, Spain
16:00 (UTC+1)	Lin 60' (o.g.); Devine 66'		Ba 84'	Stadium: Estadio José Burgos Quintana

16 January 2018 Friendly	FC Luzern (Switzerland)	1–1	(China) Shanghai Greenland Shenhua	Mijas, Spain
16:00 (UTC+1)	Demhasaj 40'		Yunding 2'	Stadium: La Cala Resort

17 January 2018 Friendly	Europa FC (Gibraltar)	1–1	(China) Shanghai Greenland Shenhua	Coín, Spain
18:15 (UTC+1)	Gómez 13' (pen.)		Romero 27'	Stadium: Estadio José Burgos Quintana

20 January 2018 Friendly	Puskás Akadémia (Hungary)	1–0	(China) Shanghai Greenland Shenhua	Coín, Spain
16:00 (UTC+1)	86'			Stadium: Estadio José Burgos Quintana

24 January 2018 Friendly	Viktoria Plzeň (Czech Republic)	1–5	(China) Shanghai Greenland Shenhua	San Pedro de Alcántara, Spain
16:00 (UTC+1)	Krmenčík 35'		Moreno 48' (pen.), 62', 72'; Martins 63', 68'	Stadium: Marbella Football Center

=== Mid-season ===
16 June 2018 Friendly	Shanghai Greenland Shenhua (China)	2–1	(China) Shanghai Shenxin	Shanghai, China
	Jiajun 55'; Haoyang 78'		36'	Stadium: Shanghai Shenhua Football Training Center

23 June 2018 Friendly	Shanghai Greenland Shenhua (China)	1–1	(China) Shanghai Shenxin	Shanghai, China
16:00 (UTC+8)	Lu 78'		Yizhen 20'	Stadium: Shanghai Shenhua Football Training Center

26 June 2018 Friendly	Shanghai Greenland Shenhua (China)	5–4	(China) Meizhou Hakka	Shanghai, China
18:00 (UTC+8)	Ba 6', 41' (pen.), 60'; Yun 45'; Haoyang 89'		Mary 20', 82'; Kerui 37'; T.Jiajun 86'	Stadium: Shanghai Shenhua Football Training Center

29 June 2018 Friendly	Shanghai Greenland Shenhua (China)	1–3	(South Korea) Jeju United	Shanghai, China
15:30 (UTC+8)	Tao 75'		Jae-woo 57'; Seong-uk 87'; Tiago 88'	Stadium: Shanghai Shenhua Football Training Center

30 June 2018 Friendly	Shanghai Greenland Shenhua (China)	2–3	(South Korea) Jeju United	Shanghai, China
19:00 (UTC+8)	Guarín 45' (pen.); Lu 82'		Magno 47'; Chang-min 50', 85'	Stadium: Shanghai Shenhua Football Training Center

6 July 2018 2018 Haikou International Football Tournament	Shanghai Greenland Shenhua (China)	0–2	(Australia) Newcastle Jets	Haikou, China
18:00 (UTC+8)			Hoffman 21'; Simmons 84'	Stadium: Wuyuan River Stadium; Referee: Ma Li

8 July 2018 2018 Haikou International Football Tournament	Shanghai Greenland Shenhua (China)	2–0	(Australia) Sydney FC	Haikou, China
20:30 (UTC+8)	Lu 8'; Romero 89'			Stadium: Wuyuan River Stadium; Referee: Fu Ming

== Competitions ==
=== Chinese Super League ===
==== League table ====
Pos	Team	Pld	W	D	L	GF	GA	GD	Pts
5	Jiangsu Suning	30	13	9	8	48	33	+15	48
6	Hebei China Fortune	30	10	9	11	46	50	−4	39
7	Shanghai Greenland Shenhua	30	10	8	12	44	53	−9	38
8	Beijing Renhe	30	9	10	11	33	46	−13	37
9	Tianjin Quanjian	30	9	9	12	41	48	−7	36 (Note: Tianjin Quanjian is ahead of Guangzhou R&F on head-to-head points: Tianjin Quanjian 2–1 Guangzhou R&F, Guangzhou R&F 2–6 Tianjin Quanjian.)

Source: League table
Rules for classification: 1) Points; 2) Head-to-head points; 3) Head-to-head goal difference; 4) Head-to-head goals scored; 5) Reserve league points; 6) U19 Elite league points; 7) Goal difference; 8) Goals scored; 9) Disciplinary points (1 point for each yellow card, 3 points for each red card); 10) Draw

==== Results summary ====
Overall								Home						Away					
Pld	W	D	L	GF	GA	GD	Pts	W	D	L	GF	GA	GD	W	D	L	GF	GA	GD
30	10	8	12	44	53	−9	38	6	6	3	24	21	+3	4	2	9	20	32	−12

Last updated: 11 November 2018.
Source: Competitive matches

==== Results by round ====
Round	1	2	3	4	5	6	7	8	9	10	11	12	13	14	15	16	17	18	19	20	21	22	23	24	25	26	27	28	29	30
Ground	H	H	A	H	A	H	A	H	A	H	A	H	A	H	A	A	A	H	A	H	A	H	A	H	A	H	A	H	A	H
Result	D	L	W	W	W	D	L	W	L	W	L	W	D	D	L	D	L	W	L	L	L	D	L	W	W	D	W	L	L	D
Position	8	13	10	6	4	4	6	5	7	6	7	6	6	6	7	6	7	6	6	9	10	11	13	7	6	6	6	6	6	7

Updated to match(es) played on 11 November 2018. Source: Competitive matches
A = Away; H = Home; W = Win; D = Draw; L = Loss

==== Matches ====
2 March 2018 1	Shanghai Greenland Shenhua	1–1	Changchun Yatai	Shanghai
19:35 (UTC+8)	Romero 28'; Shilin (yellow card) 54'	Report	Ismailov (yellow card) 11'; Rui (yellow card) 31'; Ighalo (yellow card) 37'; Dadi (yellow card) 44'; Xiaodong 62'; Chao (yellow card) 76'	Stadium: Hongkou Football Stadium; Attendance: 21,098; Referee: Ai Kun

10 March 2018 2	Shanghai Greenland Shenhua	0–2	Shanghai SIPG	Shanghai
19:35 (UTC+8)	Hao (yellow card) 6'; Peng (yellow card) 59'; Yunqiu (yellow card) 85'	Report	Jinghang (yellow card) 2'; Hulk 27'; Oscar (yellow card) 38'; Wenjun 53'; Ahmedov (yellow card) 62'	Stadium: Hongkou Football Stadium; Attendance: 23,928; Referee: Radek Příhoda (Czech Republic)

18 March 2018 3	Guizhou Hengfeng	0–1	Shanghai Greenland Shenhua	Guiyang
19:35 (UTC+8)		Report	Peng (yellow card) 30'; Aidi (yellow card) 35'; Moreno 68'	Stadium: Guiyang Olympic Sports Center; Attendance: 13,677; Referee: Lin Jun

31 March 2018 4	Shanghai Greenland Shenhua	4–2	Hebei China Fortune	Shanghai
19:35 (UTC+8)	Martins 62', 76', 90'; Guarín 82'; Aidi (yellow card) 90+3'	Report	Zhunyi (yellow card) 17'; Hang (yellow card) 24'; Chengdong 48' (yellow card) 90+2'; Lavezzi 64'	Stadium: Hongkou Football Stadium; Attendance: 21,066; Referee: Ai Kun

8 April 2018 5	Beijing Renhe	0–2	Shanghai Greenland Shenhua	Beijing
15:30 (UTC+8)	Fernández (yellow card) 62'; Jian (yellow card) 70'; Baojie (yellow card) 72'	Report	Romero 40' (yellow card) 75'; Moreno 86'; Jianqing (yellow card) 90+5'	Stadium: Beijing Fengtai Stadium; Attendance: 7,533; Referee: Guo Baolong

13 April 2018 6	Shanghai Greenland Shenhua	2–2	Guangzhou Evergrande Taobao	Shanghai
18:00 (UTC+8)	Peng (yellow card) 41'; Jiajun (yellow card) 45+1'; Jianrong 58'; Yougang 72'	Report	Zheng (yellow card) 19'; Goulart 66'; Gudelj 68' (yellow card) 79'; Hanchao (yellow card) 78'	Stadium: Hongkou Football Stadium; Attendance: 22,303; Referee: Kim Dong-jin (South Korea)

22 April 2018 7	Jiangsu Suning	5–1	Shanghai Greenland Shenhua	Nanjing
18:00 (UTC+8)		Report	Hao 29'; Jiajun (yellow card) 40'; Aidi (yellow card) 63'	Stadium: Nanjing Olympic Sports Centre; Referee: Wang Zhe

29 April 2018 8	Shanghai Greenland Shenhua	1–0	Dalian Yifang	Shanghai
19:35 (UTC+8)	Aidi (yellow card) 20'; Hao (yellow card) 24'; Moreno 62' (yellow card) 25'; Jianbin (yellow card) 66'	Report	Mushekwi (yellow card) 73'	Stadium: Hongkou Football Stadium; Attendance: 20,907; Referee: Zhang Long

5 May 2018 9	Guangzhou R&F	4–2	Shanghai Greenland Shenhua	Guangzhou
19:35 (UTC+8)	Junliang 2'; Zahavi 20'; Renatinho 37'; Urso (yellow card) 56'; Feiya 90+2'	Report	Xiaoming (red card) 21'; Sheng (yellow card) 29'; Di 60'; Peng 66'	Stadium: Yuexiushan Stadium; Referee: Shi Zhenlu

12 May 2018 10	Shanghai Greenland Shenhua	2–1	Chongqing Dangdai Lifan	Shanghai
19:35 (UTC+8)	Yougang (yellow card) 12'; Guarín 54' (yellow card) 33'; Di 63'	Report	Qing (yellow card) 32' (yellow-red card) 64'; Yongzhe (yellow card) 48'; Hao (yellow card) 54'; Jie 58'	Stadium: Hongkou Football Stadium; Attendance: 21,318; Referee: Wang Zhe

20 May 2018 11	Tianjin Quanjian	2–1	Shanghai Greenland Shenhua	Tianjin
18:00 (UTC+8)	Yuanjie 49'; Haolun (yellow card) 81'; Pato 87'; Shuai (yellow card) 90+6'	Report	Wei 82'; Yougang (yellow card) 90+2'	Stadium: Haihe Educational Football Stadium; Referee: Ma Li

18 July 2018 12	Shanghai Greenland Shenhua	1–0	Tianjin TEDA	Shanghai
19:35 (UTC+8)	Aidi (yellow card) 55'; Peng (yellow card) 74'; Ba 82'; Guarín (yellow card) 86'	Report	Yang (yellow card) 45+1'	Stadium: Hongkou Football Stadium; Attendance: 23,880; Referee: Huang Yejun

22 July 2018 13	Henan Jianye	2–2	Shanghai Greenland Shenhua	Zhengzhou
19:35 (UTC+8)	Karanga 30', 77'; Shangyuan (yellow card) 60'	Report	Lu 25'; Chenjie (yellow card) 37'; Guarín 70'	Stadium: Zhengzhou Hanghai Stadium; Referee: Lin Jun

28 July 2018 14	Shanghai Greenland Shenhua	2–2	Beijing Sinobo Guoan	Shanghai
20:00 (UTC+8)	Aidi 54' (yellow card) 45+1'; Yunqiu (yellow card) 55'; Shihao 90+1' (o.g.); Chenjie (yellow card) 90+6'	Report	Augusto 45+2'; Bakambu 65' (yellow card) 55'	Stadium: Hongkou Football Stadium; Attendance: 23,569; Referee: Guo Baolong

1 August 2018 15	Shandong Luneng Taishan	3–1	Shanghai Greenland Shenhua	Jinan
18:00 (UTC+8)	Long (yellow card) 8'; Peng 45+2' (o.g.); Tardelli 56'; Jingdao 83'	Report	Ba 37'	Stadium: Jinan Olympic Sports Center Stadium; Referee: Zhang Lei

4 August 2018 16	Changchun Yatai	1–1	Shanghai Greenland Shenhua	Changchun
18:00 (UTC+8)	Xiaodong (yellow card) 57'; Ighalo 71'; Li (yellow card) 79'	Report	Yunding 31'; Aidi (yellow card) 45+1'; Xiaoming (yellow card) 76'; Ba (yellow card) 79'; Shilin (yellow card) 80' (yellow-red card) 82'; Jiajun (yellow card) 81'	Stadium: Changchun Stadium; Referee: Huang Yejun

11 August 2018 17	Shanghai SIPG	2–0	Shanghai Greenland Shenhua	Shanghai
19:35 (UTC+8)	Guan (yellow card) 34'; Wu Lei 52'; Hulk 74' (pen.); Huikang (yellow card) 81'	Report	Peng (yellow card) 1'; Jianbin (yellow card) 45+4'; Moreno (yellow card) 48'; Aidi (yellow card) 76'	Stadium: Shanghai Stadium; Referee: Radek Příhoda (Czech Republic)

15 August 2018 18	Shanghai Greenland Shenhua	3–1	Guizhou Hengfeng	Shanghai
20:00 (UTC+8)	Yunding 9'; Yunqiu (yellow card) 38'; Romero 53', 63'	Report	Kaimu (yellow card) 18'; Mengqi (yellow card) 44'; Ting (yellow card) 72'; Trawally 90+4' (pen.)	Stadium: Hongkou Football Stadium; Attendance: 21,128; Referee: Shi Zhenlu

19 August 2018 19	Hebei China Fortune	4–1	Shanghai Greenland Shenhua	Langfang
19:35 (UTC+8)	Hang 5'; Mascherano (yellow card) 22'; Senwen 39'; Huaze 41'; Xuesheng 90+4'	Report	Ruofan (yellow card) 4'; Lu (red card) 33'; Moreno 72'	Stadium: Langfang Stadium; Attendance: 11,623; Referee: Wang Zhe

26 August 2018 20	Shanghai Greenland Shenhua	1–3	Beijing Renhe	Shanghai
19:35 (UTC+8)	Jiajun (yellow card) 68'; Moreno (yellow card) 72'; Ba 90+1'	Report	Diop 11', 27'; Jie (yellow card) 32'; Masika 39'; Houliang (yellow card) 45'	Stadium: Hongkou Football Stadium; Attendance: 21,003; Referee: Zhang Long

2 September 2018 21	Guangzhou Evergrande Taobao	2–1	Shanghai Greenland Shenhua	Guangzhou
19:35 (UTC+8)	Hanchao (yellow card) 22'; Talisca (yellow card) 43'; Xuepeng (yellow card) 52'; Lin 58'; Liyu 90+1' (yellow card) 90+2'	Report	Moreno (yellow card) 24'; Guarín 53' (pen.); Peng (yellow card) 76'; Shuai (yellow card) 77'	Stadium: Tianhe Stadium; Referee: Ravshan Irmatov (Uzbekistan)

15 September 2018 22	Shanghai Greenland Shenhua	1–1	Jiangsu Suning	Shanghai
19:35 (UTC+8)	Jiajun (yellow card) 9'; Ba 50'; Ruofan (yellow card) 54'	Report		Stadium: Hongkou Football Stadium; Attendance: 21,576; Referee: Guan Xing

22 September 2018 23	Dalian Yifang	2–1	Shanghai Greenland Shenhua	Dalian
15:30 (UTC+8)		Report	Ruofan 61'	Stadium: Dalian Sports Center Stadium; Referee: Gu Chunhan

30 September 2018 24	Shanghai Greenland Shenhua	3–1	Guangzhou R&F	Shanghai
19:35 (UTC+8)	Chenjie 31'; Guarín 39' (pen.); Peng 64'	Report	Tixiang (yellow card) 23'; Tošić (yellow card) 79'; Urso 90+2' (pen.)	Stadium: Hongkou Football Stadium; Attendance: 20,130; Referee: Zhang Lei

6 October 2018 25	Chongqing Dangdai Lifan	0–1	Shanghai Greenland Shenhua	Chongqing
19:35 (UTC+8)	Xinli (yellow card) 37'; Le (yellow card) 49'	Report	Ruofan (yellow card) 14'; Jiajun (yellow card) 30'; Guarín (yellow card) 34' (goal) 50' (pen.); Aidi (yellow card) 62'; Shuai (yellow card) 90+4'	Stadium: Chongqing Olympic Sports Center; Referee: Ma Ning

20 October 2018 26	Shanghai Greenland Shenhua	1–1	Tianjin Quanjian	Shanghai
19:35 (UTC+8)	Yunding 52'; Aidi (yellow card) 68'; Jianrong (yellow card) 89'	Report	Xu 49'; Kyung-won (yellow card) 81'; Yongpo (yellow card) 90+3'	Stadium: Hongkou Football Stadium; Attendance: 20,116; Referee: Wang Zhe

28 October 2018 27	Tianjin TEDA	2–4	Shanghai Greenland Shenhua	Tianjin
15:30 (UTC+8)	Mikel 22'; Acheampong 30' (pen.); Wangsong (yellow card) 45+1'; Liao (yellow card) 88'	Report	Moreno 14'; Yunqiu (yellow card) 21'; Jianrong 44', 86' (yellow card) 78'; Guarín 90+3'	Stadium: Tianjin Olympic Center Stadium; Referee: Fu Ming

2 November 2018 28	Shanghai Greenland Shenhua	0–2	Henan Jianye	Shanghai
19:35 (UTC+8)	Jiajun (yellow card) 35'; Shilin (yellow card) 79'		Vaz Tê 2', 90+1'	Stadium: Hongkou Football Stadium; Attendance: 20,112; Referee: Zhang Lei

7 November 2018 29	Beijing Sinobo Guoan	3–1	Shanghai Greenland Shenhua	Beijing
19:35 (UTC+8)			Chenjie (yellow card) 31'; Yang 48' (o.g.); Aidi (yellow card) 50'; Shenglong (yellow card) 57'; Yunding (yellow card) 72'; Yunqiu (red card) 77'	Stadium: Workers Stadium; Referee: Ma Ning

11 November 2018 30	Shanghai Greenland Shenhua	2–2	Shandong Luneng Taishan	Shanghai
15:00 (UTC+8)	Jianrong 25'; Peng (yellow card) 56'; Guarín (red card) 67'; Ba 74'; Yunding (yellow card) 87'			Stadium: Hongkou Football Stadium; Attendance: 20,012; Referee: Fu Ming

=== Chinese FA Cup ===
25 April 2018 Fourth Round	Nantong Zhiyun	3–2	Shanghai Greenland Shenhua	Rugao
19:35 (UTC+8)	Yue (yellow card) 16'; Aidi 57' (o.g.); Ming 62'; Jun 86' (yellow card) 70'	Report	Di 11'; Peng (yellow card) 14'; Yun 33' (pen.); Jianqing (yellow card) 89'	Stadium: Rugao Olympic Sports Center; Referee: Shan Dan'ao

=== Chinese FA Super Cup ===
26 February 2018	Guangzhou Evergrande Taobao	4–1	Shanghai Greenland Shenhua	Shanghai
19:35 (UTC+8)	Hanwen (yellow card) 23'; Bowen 26'; Alan 43'; Hanchao (yellow card) 45'; Lin 64'; Goulart (yellow card) 86' (goal) 90+1' (pen.)	Report	Guarín 37'; Yunqiu (yellow card) 46'	Stadium: Hongkou Football Stadium; Attendance: 23,998; Referee: Fu Ming

=== AFC Champions League ===
==== Group stage ====
Pos	Team	Pld	W	D	L	GF	GA	GD	Pts	Qualification
1	(South Korea) Suwon Samsung Bluewings	6	3	1	2	8	7	+1	10	Advance to knockout stage
2	(Japan) Kashima Antlers	6	2	3	1	8	6	+2	9	Advance to knockout stage
3	(Australia) Sydney FC	6	1	3	2	7	8	−1	6	
4	(China) Shanghai Shenhua	6	0	5	1	6	8	−2	5	

Source: AFC
Rules for classification: Group stage tiebreakers

14 February 2018 1	Kashima Antlers (Japan)	1–1	(China) Shanghai Shenhua	Kashima, Japan
19:00 (UTC+9)	Pedro Júnior (yellow card) 21'; Endo 51'; Shōji (yellow card) 55'	Report	Moreno 3'; Yunqiu (yellow card) 45+2'	Stadium: Kashima Soccer Stadium; Attendance: 9,192; Referee: Muhammad Taqi (Singapore)

21 February 2018 2	Shanghai Shenhua (China)	2–2	(Australia) Sydney FC	Shanghai, China
20:00 (UTC+8)	Martins 26'; Guarín 39'; Jiajun (yellow card) 66'; Moreno (yellow card) 68'	Report	Wilkshire 28'; Brosque 34'	Stadium: Hongkou Football Stadium; Attendance: 22,918; Referee: Valentin Kovalenko (Uzbekistan)

7 March 2018 3	Suwon Samsung Bluewings (South Korea)	1–1	(China) Shanghai Shenhua	Suwon, South Korea
19:00 (UTC+9)	Ki-je 47'	Report	Kai (yellow card) 15'; Moreno 71' (pen.); Shuai (yellow card) 84'	Stadium: Suwon World Cup Stadium; Attendance: 3,904; Referee: Nivon Robesh Gamini (Sri Lanka)

13 March 2018 4	Shanghai Shenhua (China)	0–2	(South Korea) Suwon Samsung Bluewings	Shanghai, China
20:00 (UTC+8)	Lin (yellow card) 49'; Guarín (yellow card) 68'	Report	Jong-sung (yellow card) 30'; Eun-sun (yellow card) 47'; Damjanović 51'; Sang-hyub (yellow card) 72'; Sung-keun 88'	Stadium: Hongkou Football Stadium; Attendance: 21,990; Referee: Ali Abdulnabi (Bahrain)

3 April 2018 5	Shanghai Shenhua (China)	2–2	(Japan) Kashima Antlers	Shanghai, China
20:00 (UTC+8)	Moreno 13' (pen.); Jianqing 28'; Wei (yellow card) 46'; Guarín (yellow card) 87'	Report	Mu (yellow card) 44'; Suzuki 58'; Leandro 63'; Ueda (yellow card) 71'; Ogasawara (yellow card) 79'	Stadium: Hongkou Football Stadium; Attendance: 20,028; Referee: Mohd Amirul Izwan Yaacob (Malaysia)

17 April 2018 6	Sydney FC (Australia)	0–0	(China) Shanghai Shenhua	Sydney, Australia
20:00 (UTC+10)	Brosque (yellow card) 87'; Warland (yellow card) 90+1'	Report	Lu (yellow card) 22'; Moreno (yellow card) 45'; Shilin (yellow card) 90'; Kai (yellow card) 90+1'	Stadium: Sydney Football Stadium; Attendance: 9,855; Referee: Mohanad Qasim (Iraq)

== Squad statistics ==
As of match played 11 November 2018

=== Appearances and goals ===
No.	Pos	Nat	Player	Total		Super League		FA Cup		Champions League		Super Cup	
No.	Pos	Nat	Player	Apps	Goals	Apps	Goals	Apps	Goals	Apps	Goals	Apps	Goals
2	DF	(China) CHN	Xu Yougang	12	1	9+2	1	0	0	1	0	0	0
3	DF	(China) CHN	Li Jianbin	7	0	2+2	0	0	0	2	0	1	0
4	DF	(China) CHN	Jiang Shenglong	3	0	1+2	0	0	0	0	0	0	0
5	DF	(China) CHN	Zhu Chenjie	15	1	13+2	1	0	0	0	0	0	0
6	DF	(China) CHN	Li Peng	30	2	25	2	1	0	3+1	0	0	0
7	FW	(China) CHN	Mao Jianqing	15	1	2+6	0	0+1	0	1+4	1	1	0
8	MF	(China) CHN	Zhang Lu	16	1	5+3	1	1	0	1+5	0	0+1	0
9	FW	(Senegal) SEN	Demba Ba	17	5	17	5	0	0	0	0	0	0
10	MF	(Colombia) COL	Giovanni Moreno	34	8	27	5	0	0	5+1	3	1	0
11	MF	(Paraguay) PAR	Óscar Romero	17	4	17	4	0	0	0	0	0	0
12	GK	(China) CHN	Chen Zhao	0	0	0	0	0	0	0	0	0	0
13	MF	(Colombia) COL	Fredy Guarín	31	9	25	7	0	0	5	1	1	1
14	DF	(China) CHN	Sun Kai	4	0	0	0	1	0	3	0	0	0
15	FW	(China) CHN	Zhu Jianrong	12	4	6+5	4	0	0	1	0	0	0
16	DF	(China) CHN	Li Yunqiu	16	0	9+3	0	0	0	2+1	0	1	0
18	FW	(China) CHN	Gao Di	15	3	2+9	2	1	1	2+1	0	0	0
19	DF	(China) CHN	Li Xiaoming	12	0	2+7	0	0	0	2	0	0+1	0
20	MF	(China) CHN	Wang Yun	6	1	0+1	0	1	1	2+2	0	0	0
21	MF	(China) CHN	Xu Haoyang	1	0	0+1	0	0	0	0	0	0	0
22	GK	(China) CHN	Qiu Shengjiong	5	0	4	0	0	0	1	0	0	0
23	DF	(China) CHN	Bai Jiajun	28	0	24+1	0	0	0	3	0	0	0
24	DF	(China) CHN	Rong Hao	24	1	18+5	1	1	0	0	0	0	0
25	DF	(China) CHN	Wang Lin	8	0	2+2	0	1	0	3	0	0	0
27	GK	(China) CHN	Li Shuai	33	0	26	0	1	0	5	0	1	0
28	MF	(China) CHN	Cao Yunding	21	3	18+1	3	0	0	2	0	0	0
29	MF	(China) CHN	Zhou Junchen	6	0	0+6	0	0	0	0	0	0	0
30	DF	(China) CHN	Tao Jin	3	0	0	0	0	0	3	0	0	0
31	MF	(China) CHN	Wang Wei	8	1	2+3	1	0+1	0	1+1	0	0	0
32	DF	(China) CHN	Aidi Fulangxisi	32	1	27	1	1	0	3	0	1	0
34	DF	(China) CHN	Bi Jinhao	2	0	0	0	0	0	1	0	1	0
35	MF	(China) CHN	Lü Pin	1	0	0	0	0	0	1	0	0	0
36	MF	(China) CHN	Liu Ruofan	27	1	17+7	1	0	0	2	0	0+1	0
37	MF	(China) CHN	Sun Shilin	24	0	19+1	0	0+1	0	2+1	0	0	0
39	MF	(China) CHN	Cong Zhen	15	0	1+11	0	1	0	0+1	0	1	0
Players who away from the club on loan:
26	MF	(China) CHN	Qin Sheng	15	0	9	0	1	0	4	0	1	0
Players who left Shanghai Greenland Shenhua during the season:
17	FW	(Nigeria) NGR	Obafemi Martins	7	4	1	3	0	0	5	1	1	0

=== Goal scorers ===
Place	Position	Nation	Number	Name	Super League	FA Cup	Champions League	Super Cup	Total
1	MF	(Colombia)	13	Fredy Guarín	7	0	1	1	9
2	MF	(Colombia)	10	Giovanni Moreno	5	0	3	0	8
3	FW	(Senegal)	9	Demba Ba	5	0	0	0	5
4	MF	(Paraguay)	11	Óscar Romero	4	0	0	0	4
4	FW	(China)	15	Zhu Jianrong	4	0	0	0	4
4	FW	(Nigeria)	17	Obafemi Martins	3	0	1	0	4
7	MF	(China)	28	Cao Yunding	3	0	0	0	3
7	FW	(China)	18	Gao Di	2	1	0	0	3
9	DF	(China)	6	Li Peng	2	0	0	0	2
9				Own goal	2	0	0	0	2
11	DF	(China)	2	Xu Yougang	1	0	0	0	1
11	DF	(China)	24	Rong Hao	1	0	0	0	1
11	MF	(China)	31	Wang Wei	1	0	0	0	1
11	MF	(China)	8	Zhang Lu	1	0	0	0	1
11	DF	(China)	32	Aidi Fulangxisi	1	0	0	0	1
11	MF	(China)	36	Liu Ruofan	1	0	0	0	1
11	DF	(China)	5	Zhu Chenjie	1	0	0	0	1
11	MF	(China)	20	Wang Yun	0	1	0	0	1
11	FW	(China)	7	Mao Jianqing	0	0	1	0	1
				TOTALS	44	2	6	1	53

=== Disciplinary record ===
Number	Nation	Position	Name	Super League			FA Cup			Champions League			Super Cup			Total		
Number	Nation	Position	Name	Yellow card	(yellow card) (yellow-red card)	Red card	Yellow card	(yellow card) (yellow-red card)	Red card	Yellow card	(yellow card) (yellow-red card)	Red card	Yellow card	(yellow card) (yellow-red card)	Red card	Yellow card	(yellow card) (yellow-red card)	Red card
2	(China)	DF	Xu Yougang	2	0	0	0	0	0	0	0	0	0	0	0	2	0	0
3	(China)	DF	Li Jianbin	2	0	0	0	0	0	0	0	0	0	0	0	2	0	0
4	(China)	DF	Jiang Shenglong	1	0	0	0	0	0	0	0	0	0	0	0	1	0	0
5	(China)	DF	Zhu Chenjie	3	0	0	0	0	0	0	0	0	0	0	0	3	0	0
6	(China)	DF	Li Peng	7	0	0	1	0	0	0	0	0	0	0	0	8	0	0
7	(China)	FW	Mao Jianqing	1	0	0	1	0	0	0	0	0	0	0	0	2	0	0
8	(China)	MF	Zhang Lu	0	0	1	0	0	0	1	0	0	0	0	0	1	0	1
9	(Senegal)	FW	Demba Ba	1	0	0	0	0	0	0	0	0	0	0	0	1	0	0
10	(Colombia)	MF	Giovanni Moreno	4	0	0	0	0	0	2	0	0	0	0	0	6	0	0
11	(Paraguay)	MF	Óscar Romero	1	0	0	0	0	0	0	0	0	0	0	0	1	0	0
13	(Colombia)	MF	Fredy Guarín	3	0	1	0	0	0	2	0	0	0	0	0	5	0	1
14	(China)	DF	Sun Kai	0	0	0	0	0	0	2	0	0	0	0	0	2	0	0
15	(China)	FW	Zhu Jianrong	2	0	0	0	0	0	0	0	0	0	0	0	2	0	0
16	(China)	DF	Li Yunqiu	4	0	1	0	0	0	1	0	0	1	0	0	6	0	1
19	(China)	DF	Li Xiaoming	1	0	1	0	0	0	0	0	0	0	0	0	1	0	1
23	(China)	DF	Bai Jiajun	7	0	0	0	0	0	1	0	0	0	0	0	8	0	0
24	(China)	DF	Rong Hao	2	0	0	0	0	0	0	0	0	0	0	0	2	0	0
25	(China)	DF	Wang Lin	0	0	0	0	0	0	1	0	0	0	0	0	1	0	0
26	(China)	MF	Qin Sheng	1	0	0	0	0	0	0	0	0	0	0	0	1	0	0
27	(China)	GK	Li Shuai	2	0	0	0	0	0	1	0	0	0	0	0	3	0	0
28	(China)	MF	Cao Yunding	2	0	0	0	0	0	0	0	0	0	0	0	2	0	0
31	(China)	MF	Wang Wei	0	0	0	0	0	0	1	0	0	0	0	0	1	0	0
32	(China)	DF	Aidi Fulangxisi	11	0	0	0	0	0	0	0	0	0	0	0	11	0	0
36	(China)	MF	Liu Ruofan	3	0	0	0	0	0	0	0	0	0	0	0	3	0	0
37	(China)	MF	Sun Shilin	2	1	0	0	0	0	1	0	0	0	0	0	3	1	0
			Total	62	1	4	2	0	0	13	0	0	1	0	0	78	1	4
