= 2019 Shanghai Greenland Shenhua F.C. season =

Shanghai Shenhua
- Chairman: Wu Xiaohui
- Head coach: Choi Kang-hee
- Stadium: Hongkou Football Stadium
- Super League: 13th
- FA Cup: Winners
- Top goalscorer: League: Giovanni Moreno (11 goals); All: Giovanni Moreno (13 goals)
- Average home league attendance: 21,843
Home colours	Away colours

The 2019 Shanghai Greenland Shenhua season was Shanghai Greenland Shenhua's 16th season in the Chinese Super League and 57th overall in the Chinese top flight. They also competed in the Chinese FA Cup, defeating Shandong Luneng Taishan in the two-legged final by an aggregate score of 3–1.

== Season events ==
Spanish coach Quique Sánchez Flores was named as the new head coach of the club on 25 December 2018. He replaced Wu Jingui, who took over as sporting director after steering Shenhua to victory in the Chinese FA Cup in 2017.

== Squad ==
=== First team squad ===
As of 28 February 2019

Note: Flags indicate national team as defined under FIFA eligibility rules; some limited exceptions apply. Players may hold more than one non-FIFA nationality.

No.	Pos.	Nation	Player
1	GK	CHN	Shen Jun
2	DF	CHN	Xu Yougang
3	DF	CHN	Bi Jinhao
4	DF	CHN	Jiang Shenglong
5	DF	CHN	Zhu Chenjie
6	DF	CHN	Li Peng
8	MF	CHN	Zhang Lu
9	FW	NGR	Odion Ighalo
10	MF	COL	Giovanni Moreno (Captain)
12	GK	CHN	Chen Zhao
14	DF	CHN	Sun Kai
15	FW	CHN	Zhu Jianrong
16	DF	CHN	Li Yunqiu
17	MF	CHN	Wu Yizhen
18	FW	CHN	Gao Di

No.	Pos.	Nation	Player
19	MF	CHN	Zhan Yilin
20	FW	KOR	Kim Shin-wook
21	MF	CHN	Xu Haoyang
22	FW	ITA	Stephan El Shaarawy
23	DF	CHN	Bai Jiajun
26	MF	CHN	Alexander N'Doumbou
27	GK	CHN	Li Shuai
28	MF	CHN	Cao Yunding
29	MF	CHN	Zhou Junchen
31	MF	CHN	Wang Wei
32	DF	CHN	Aidi Fulangxisi
33	MF	CHN	Wang Haijian
36	MF	CHN	Liu Ruofan
37	MF	CHN	Sun Shilin
39	MF	CHN	Cong Zhen

Source：

=== Reserve squad ===
Note: Flags indicate national team as defined under FIFA eligibility rules; some limited exceptions apply. Players may hold more than one non-FIFA nationality.

No.	Pos.	Nation	Player
41	FW	CHN	Mao Jianqing
42	DF	CHN	Huang Linhao
43	MF	CHN	Xu Jun
44	DF	CHN	Gong Jinshuai
45	MF	CHN	Liu Qiuqi
46	DF	CHN	Guo Chen
47	FW	CHN	Hai Xiaorui
48	MF	CHN	Li Lianxiang
49	DF	CHN	Yan Xinyu
50	MF	CHN	Lü Pin

No.	Pos.	Nation	Player
51	MF	CHN	Liu Jiawei
52	DF	CHN	Deng Biao
53	FW	CHN	Xie Jinzheng
54	DF	CHN	Wang Jiahao
55	GK	CHN	Li Yangxin
56	MF	CHN	Su Yihao
57	DF	CHN	Su Shihao
58	FW	CHN	Sun Qinhan
59	MF	CHN	Xu Lei
60	GK	CHN	Jiang Yutao

== Transfers and loans ==
=== Transfers in ===
When	Pos.	Player	Age	Moving from	Type	Transfer fee	Notes	Source
Winter	MF	(China) Wu Yizhen	24	(China) Shanghai Shenxin	Transfer	Undisclosed		
Winter	FW	(Nigeria) Odion Ighalo	29	(China) Changchun Yatai	Transfer	Undisclosed		
Winter	MF	(China) Alexander N'Doumbou	27	(Bulgaria) FC Vereya	Transfer	Undisclosed		
Winter	MF	(China) Liu Jiawei	25	(China) Xinjiang Tianshan Leopard	Loan return	Free	Reserve squad	
Winter	MF	(China) Zhang Yuhao	21	(China) Baotou Nanjiao	Loan return	Free	Reserve squad	
Winter	MF	(China) Cui Qi	25	(China) Baotou Nanjiao	Loan return	Free	Reserve squad	
Winter	FW	(China) Yan Ge	25	(China) Baotou Nanjiao	Loan return	Free	Reserve squad	
Winter	DF	(China) Deng Biao	23	(China) Xinjiang Tianshan Leopard	Loan return	Free	Reserve squad	

=== Transfers out ===
When	Pos.	Player	Age	Moving to	Type	Transfer fee	Notes	Source
Winter	DF	(China) Rong Hao	31	(China) Guangzhou Evergrande Taobao	End of loan	Free		
Winter	GK	(China) Qiu Shengjiong	33	Guangdong South China Tiger	Released	Free	End of contract	
Winter	DF	(China) Tao Jin	33		Retired			
Winter	DF	(China) Wang Lin	31		Released	Free	End of contract	
Winter	MF	(China) Wang Shouting	33	(China) Guizhou Hengfeng	Released	Free	End of contract	
Winter	MF	(China) Qin Sheng	32	(China) Dalian Yifang	Transfer	Undisclosed	Obligation to buy	
Winter	FW	(Senegal) Demba Ba	33	(Turkey) İstanbul Başakşehir	Contract terminated	Free	Mutual consent	
Winter	DF	(China) Li Jianbin	29	(China) Dalian Yifang	Transfer	Undisclosed		
Winter	DF	(China) Li Xiaoming	23	(China) Changchun Yatai	Transfer	Undisclosed		
Winter	DF	(China) Xu Xiao	19	(China) Changchun Yatai	Transfer	Undisclosed		
Winter	FW	(China) Gao Shipeng	25	(China) Shanxi Metropolis	Released	Free	End of contract	
Winter	GK	(China) Yu Qixuan	22	(China) Hangzhou Wuyue Qiantang	Released	Free	End of contract	
Winter	MF	(China) Wang Yun	35		Retired			

=== Loans out ===
No	Pos.	Player	Age	Loaned to	Start	End	Source
-	MF	(China) Chen Tao	23	(China) Jilin Baijia	26 February 2019	End of season	
-	MF	(China) Xu Yue	19	(China) Shanghai Shenxin	27 February 2019	End of season	
-	GK	(China) Peng Peng	18	(China) Shanghai Shenxin	27 February 2019	End of season	
-	FW	(China) Sun Xipeng	19	(China) Shanghai Shenxin	27 February 2019	End of season	
-	DF	(China) Cao Chuanyu	24	(China) Shanghai Shenxin	27 February 2019	End of season	

== Friendlies ==
=== Pre-season ===
20 January 2019 Friendly	FC Steaua București (Romania)	2–2	(China) Shanghai Greenland Shenhua	Marbella, Spain
16:00 (UTC+1)	Tănase 8'; Li Peng 49' (o.g.)	Report	Romero 72'; Li Peng 75'

23 January 2019 Friendly	CSKA Sofia (Bulgaria)	1–0	(China) Shanghai Greenland Shenhua	Marbella, Spain
16:00 (UTC+1)	Sowe 79'	Report		Stadium: La Quinta Football Pitch

27 January 2019 Friendly	Mons Calpe (Gibraltar)	0–1	(China) Shanghai Greenland Shenhua	Marbella, Spain
16:00 (UTC+1)			Wu Yizhen 16'

31 January 2019 Friendly	New England Revolution (United States)	0–0	(China) Shanghai Greenland Shenhua	Marbella, Spain
11:00 (UTC+1)				Stadium: Marbella Football Center

16 February 2019 Friendly	Shanghai Greenland Shenhua (China)	1–3	(South Korea) Daegu FC	Shanghai, China
16:00 (UTC+8)				Stadium: Shanghai Shenhua Football Training Center

23 February 2019 Friendly	Shanghai Greenland Shenhua (China)	3–0	(China) Dalian Yifang	Shanghai, China
15:00 (UTC+8)	N'Doumbou 40'; Guarín 60'; Li Peng 69'			Stadium: Hongkou Football Stadium

== Competitions ==
=== Chinese Super League ===
==== League table ====
Pos	Team	Pld	W	D	L	GF	GA	GD	Pts	Qualification or relegation
11	Hebei China Fortune	30	9	6	15	37	55	−18	33	
12	Guangzhou R&F	30	9	5	16	54	72	−18	32	
13	Shanghai Greenland Shenhua	30	8	6	16	43	57	−14	30	Qualification for AFC Champions League group stage (Note: Shanghai Greenland Shenhua qualified for the AFC Champions League group stage as Chinese FA Cup winners.)
14	Tianjin Tianhai (D)	30	4	13	13	40	53	−13	25	Dissolved at May 2020 after season 2019
15	Shenzhen F.C.	30	4	9	17	31	57	−26	21	

Source: CSL
Rules for classification:
- During season: 1) Points; 2) Goal difference; 3) Goals scored.
- After season: 1) Points; 2) Head-to-head points; 3) Head-to-head goal difference; 4) Head-to-head goals scored; 5) Scores of the weight ratio of the reserve league and youth leagues.
  (D) Disqualified
  Notes:

==== Results summary ====
Overall								Home						Away					
Pld	W	D	L	GF	GA	GD	Pts	W	D	L	GF	GA	GD	W	D	L	GF	GA	GD
25	7	6	12	39	47	−8	27	4	2	6	21	27	−6	3	4	6	18	20	−2

Last updated: 26 September 2019.
Source: Competitive matches

==== Results by round ====
Round	1	2	3	4	5	6	7	8	9	10	11	12	13	14	15	16	17	18	19	20	21	22	23	24	25	26	27	28	29	30
Ground	H	H	A	H	A	A	H	A	A	H	A	H	A	A	H	A	A	H	A	H	H	A	H	A	H	H	A			
Result	L	L	W	W	L	D	L	L	D	L	L	D	L	W	L	L	L	W	W	W	D	D	L	D	W					
Position	16	16	11	7	9	9	10	11	11	15	15	15	15	12	12	12	12	12	12	12	12	12	12	12	12					

Updated to match(es) played on 26 September 2019. Source: Competitive matches
A = Away; H = Home; W = Win; D = Draw; L = Loss

==== Matches ====
1 March 2019 1	Shanghai Greenland Shenhua	0–4	Shanghai SIPG	Shanghai
19:35 (UTC+8)	Cao Yunding (yellow card) 46'; Bai Jiajun (yellow card) 47' (red card) 73'; Gao Di (yellow card) 64'			Stadium: Hongkou Football Stadium; Attendance: 23,832; Referee: Milorad Mažić

10 March 2019 2	Shanghai Greenland Shenhua	1–2	Hebei China Fortune	Shanghai
19:35 (UTC+8)	Ighalo 33'; Cong Zhen (yellow card) 89'			Stadium: Hongkou Football Stadium; Attendance: 21,123; Referee: Wang Zhe

31 March 2019 3	Henan Jianye	1–2	Shanghai Greenland Shenhua	Zhengzhou
17:30 (UTC+8)			Ighalo (yellow card) 25' (goal) 52'; Moreno 88'	Stadium: Zhengzhou Hanghai Stadium; Referee: Wang Jing

7 April 2019 4	Shanghai Greenland Shenhua	5–1	Beijing Renhe	Shanghai
19:35 (UTC+8)	Moreno 21'; Guarín 33' (pen.); Ighalo 35', 66'; Zhang Lu 80' (yellow card) 81'			Stadium: Hongkou Football Stadium; Attendance: 21,756; Referee: Shi Zhenlu

12 April 2019 5	Guangzhou R&F	2–1	Shanghai Greenland Shenhua	Guangzhou
19:35 (UTC+8)			Cong Zhen (yellow card) 55'; Ighalo 90' (pen.)	Stadium: Yuexiushan Stadium; Attendance: 9,203; Referee: Huang Yejun

21 April 2019 6	Wuhan Zall	1–1	Shanghai Greenland Shenhua	Wuhan
19:35 (UTC+8)			Ighalo 31'	Stadium: Dongxihu Sports Centre; Referee: Ma Li

27 April 2019 7	Shanghai Greenland Shenhua	2–3	Tianjin Tianhai	Shanghai
19:35 (UTC+8)				Stadium: Hongkou Football Stadium; Attendance: 20,714; Referee: Mark Clattenburg

5 May 2019 8	Shenzhen	2–1	Shanghai Greenland Shenhua	Shenzhen
19:35 (UTC+8)			Ighalo 76' (pen.)	Stadium: Shenzhen Universiade Sports Centre; Referee: Milorad Mažić

10 May 2019 9	Tianjin TEDA	1–1	Shanghai Greenland Shenhua	Tianjin
19:35 (UTC+8)			Moreno 50'	Stadium: Tianjin Olympic Center; Referee: Zhang Lei

17 May 2019 10	Shanghai Greenland Shenhua	1 – 3	Shandong Luneng Taishan	Shanghai
19:00 (UTC+8)	Moreno 23'; N'Doumbou (yellow card) 54'	Report	Pellè 15'; Gil 58'; Fellaini 75'	Stadium: Hongkou Football Stadium; Attendance: 20,746; Referee: (England) Mark Clattenburg

26 May 2019 11	Dalian Yifang	1 – 0	Shanghai Greenland Shenhua	Dalian
16:30 (UTC+8)	Hamšík 55'; Carrasco (yellow card) 74'	Report		Stadium: Dalian Sports Center Stadium; Attendance: 22,619; Referee: (China) Guan Xing

1 June 2019 12	Shanghai Greenland Shenhua	0 – 0	Chongqing Siwei	Shanghai
20:35 (UTC+8)	Cong Zhen (yellow card) 40'; N'Doumbou (yellow card) 67'	Report	Ding Jie (yellow card) 54'; Alan Kardec (yellow card) 57'	Stadium: Hongkou Football Stadium; Attendance: 21,429; Referee: (China) Li Haixin

14 June 2019 13	Beijing Sinobo Guoan	2 – 1	Shanghai Greenland Shenhua	Beijing
19:00 (UTC+8)	Piao Cheng 14'; Renato Augusto 41'	Report	Xu Yougang (yellow card) 31'; Li Peng (yellow card) 54'; Wu Yizhen 90'	Stadium: Workers' Stadium; Attendance: 40,418; Referee: (England) Mark Clattenburg

21 June 2019 14	Jiangsu Suning	0–1	Shanghai Greenland Shenhua	Nanjing
20:35 (UTC+8)	Gao Tianyi (yellow card) 89'	Report	Aidi (yellow card) 54'; Moreno 71'; Cong Zhen (yellow card) 79'; N'Doumbou (yellow card) 90+2'	Stadium: Nanjing Olympic Sports Centre; Attendance: 47,827; Referee: (Serbia) Milorad Mažić

1 July 2019 15	Shanghai Greenland Shenhua	0–3	Guangzhou Evergrande	Shanghai
19:35 (UTC+8)	Guarín (yellow card) 26'	Report	Gao Zhunyi (yellow card) 8'; Yan Dinghao 12' (yellow card) 24'; Wei Shihao 37', 51'; Yang Liyu (yellow card) 75'	Stadium: Hongkou Football Stadium; Referee: (China) Ma Ning

6 July 2019 16	Shanghai SIPG	3–1	Shanghai Greenland Shenhua	Shanghai
20:35 (UTC+8)	Hulk 16' 62'; He Guan (yellow card) 29'; Wang Shenchao 66' (yellow card) 77'; Chen Binbin (yellow card) 86'	Report	Sun Shilin (yellow card) 61'; He Guan 64' (o.g.); Aidi (yellow card) 66'	Stadium: Shanghai Stadium; Attendance: 25,639; Referee: (Bahrain) Nawaf Shukralla

12 July 2019 17	Hebei China Fortune	2–1	Shanghai Greenland Shenhua	Langfang
20:35 (UTC+8)	Mascherano (yellow card) 63'; Ren Hang (yellow card) 75'; Marcão 79'; Dong Xuesheng 83'	Report	Kim Shin-wook 15' (yellow card) 36'; Aidi (yellow card) 56'	Stadium: Langfang Stadium; Attendance: 15,786; Referee: (China) Zhang Lei

16 July 2019 18	Shanghai Greenland Shenhua	3–2	Henan Jianye	Shanghai
20:35 (UTC+8)	Kim Shin-wook 17'; Moreno 36'; Cong Zhen 64'	Report	Fernando Karanga (yellow card) 22' (goal) 45+1' 45+3'; Han Xuan (red card) 34'	Stadium: Hongkou Football Stadium; Attendance: 22,598; Referee: (China) Shi Zhenlu

21 July 2019 19	Beijing Renhe	1–4	Shanghai Greenland Shenhua	Beijing
19:00 (UTC+8)	Zhang Chenlong (yellow card) 33'; Liu Jian (yellow card) 55'; Diop 61' (pen.); Luo Xin (yellow card) 84'	Report	Kim Shin-wook 5'; Jiang Shenglong 21' (yellow card) 67'; Moreno 38'; N'Doumbou 90+5'	Stadium: Beijing Fengtai Stadium; Attendance: 9,127; Referee: (China) Wang Jing

27 July 2019 20	Shanghai Greenland Shenhua	5–3	Guangzhou R&F	Shanghai
20:35 (UTC+8)	Moreno 13' 19'; Sun Shilin (yellow card) 51'; Kim Shin-wook 58' 60' 76'	Report	Zahavi 5'; Ye Chugui 41'; Saba (yellow card) 65' (goal) 90+3'	Stadium: Hongkou Football Stadium; Attendance: 23,115; Referee: (England) Mark Clattenburg

2 August 2019 21	Shanghai Greenland Shenhua	2–2	Wuhan Zall	Shanghai
20:35 (UTC+8)	Kim Shin-wook 32' 44'; N'Doumbou (yellow card) 45+2'; Bai Jiajun (yellow card) 59'	Report	Léo Baptistão 26' (yellow card) 90+7'; Liao Junjian (yellow card) 32'; Li Hang (yellow card) 39'; Kouassi 48'; Liu Yi (yellow card) 90+2'	Stadium: Hongkou Football Stadium; Attendance: 24,123; Referee: (China) Huang Yejun

15 August 2019 22	Tianjin Tianhai	2–2	Shanghai Greenland Shenhua	Tianjin
20:35 (UTC+8)	Renatinho (yellow card) 21' (goal) 72' (pen.); Zhang Chenglin (yellow card) 27'; Wang Xiaolong (yellow card) 42'; Pei Shuai (yellow card) 43'; Yao Junsheng (yellow card) 44'; Yang Xu 49'; Zhang Cheng (yellow card) 90+1'	Report	Sun Kai (yellow card) 10'; Moreno 39'; Cao Yunding (yellow card) 42'; El Shaarawy (yellow card) 48' (goal) 58'	Stadium: Tianjin Olympic Center; Attendance: 11,711; Referee: (China) Gu Chunhan

15 September 2019 23	Shanghai Greenland Shenhua	0–3	Tianjin TEDA	Shanghai
18:30 (UTC+8)	N'Doumbou (yellow card) 19'; Li Peng (yellow card) 42'	Report	Zheng Kaimu (yellow card) 9' (goal) 51'; Acheampong 12'; Wagner 21' (yellow card) 77'; Mirahmetjan Muzepper (yellow card) 62'	Stadium: Hongkou Football Stadium; Attendance: 22,015; Referee: (China) Li Haixin

21 September 2019 24	Shandong Luneng Taishan	2–2	Shanghai Greenland Shenhua	Jinan
20:35 (UTC+8)	Liu Binbin 19'; Zhang Chi (yellow card) 29'; Fellaini 58'; Dai Lin (yellow card) 79'	Report	Zhang Chi 7' (o.g.); Cao Yunding 11'	Stadium: Jinan Olympic Sports Center Stadium; Attendance: 24,057; Referee: (China) Ma Ning (referee)

26 September 2019 25	Shanghai Greenland Shenhua	2–1	Shenzhen	Shanghai
20:35 (UTC+8)	Bi Jinhao (yellow card) 22'; Cao Yunding 26'; Kim Shin-wook 86' (yellow card) 87'; Sun Shilin (yellow card) 90+4'	Report	Dyego Sousa 22' (pen.); Selnæs (red card) 90+4'; Liu Yiming (yellow card) 90+5'	Stadium: Hongkou Football Stadium; Referee: (England) Mark Clattenburg

20 October 2019 26	Shanghai Greenland Shenhua	v	Dalian Yifang	Shanghai
20:35 (UTC+8)				Stadium: Hongkou Football Stadium

=== Chinese FA Cup ===
1 May 2019 Fourth Round	Shenzhen	0–3; Awarded (Note: CFA awarded Shanghai Greenland Shenhua a 3–0 win as a result of Shenzhen F.C. failing to field three under-23 players in this match. The match was originally ended 0–1.)	Shanghai Greenland Shenhua	Shenzhen
17:30 (UTC+8)				Stadium: Shenzhen Universiade Sports Centre; Referee: Gu Chunhan

29 May 2019 Fifth Round	Shanghai Greenland Shenhua	3 – 2 (a.e.t.)	Chongqing Dangdai Lifan	Shanghai
21:00 (UTC+8)	Jiang Shenglong 30' (yellow card) 51'; Óscar Romero 59'; Zhu Jianrong 108'; Aidi (yellow card) 113'	Report	Peng Xinli 4' (yellow card) 41'; Dong Honglin 12'; Jiang Zhe (yellow card) 52'	Stadium: Hongkou Football Stadium; Attendance: 19,682; Referee: (Serbia) Milorad Mažić

24 July 2019 Quarter-finals	Tianjin TEDA	1 – 3	Shanghai Greenland Shenhua	Tianjin
21:00	Gao Jiarun (yellow card) 82'; Qiu Tianyi (yellow card) 90'; Johnathan 90+5'	Report	Gao Di 39'; Li Yang (yellow card) 53'; Bi Jinhao 74'; Cao Yunding 83'	Stadium: Tianjin Olympic Center; Attendance: 10,451; Referee: (Japan) Yusuke Araki

19 August 2019 Semi-finals	Dalian Yifang	2 – 3	Shanghai Greenland Shenhua	Dalian
20:35	Hamšík 14'; Dong Yanfeng (yellow card) 55'; Zheng Long (yellow card) 76' (goal) 84'	Report	El Shaarawy 22' 45+2'; Bai Jiajun (yellow card) 26'; Moreno 69'	Stadium: Dalian Sports Center Stadium; Attendance: 50,089; Referee: (Singapore) Muhammad Taqi

31 October 2019 Final First Leg	Shandong Luneng Taishan	v	Shanghai Greenland Shenhua	Jinan
				Stadium: Jinan Olympic Sports Center Stadium

5 December 2019 Final Second Leg	Shanghai Greenland Shenhua	v	Shandong Luneng Taishan	Shanghai
				Stadium: Hongkou Football Stadium

== Squad statistics ==
As of match played on 21 April 2019

=== Appearances and goals ===
No.	Pos	Nat	Player	Total		Super League		FA Cup	
No.	Pos	Nat	Player	Apps	Goals	Apps	Goals	Apps	Goals
1	GK	(China) CHN	Shen Jun	1	0	1	0	0	0
2	DF	(China) CHN	Xu Yougang	1	0	1	0	0	0
3	DF	(China) CHN	Bi Jinhao	1	0	1	0	0	0
4	DF	(China) CHN	Jiang Shenglong	4	0	2+2	0	0	0
5	DF	(China) CHN	Zhu Chenjie	4	0	4	0	0	0
6	DF	(China) CHN	Li Peng	6	0	6	0	0	0
8	MF	(China) CHN	Zhang Lu	5	1	2+3	1	0	0
9	FW	(Nigeria) NGR	Odion Ighalo	6	6	6	6	0	0
10	MF	(Colombia) COL	Giovanni Moreno	5	2	5	2	0	0
11	MF	(Paraguay) PAR	Óscar Romero	3	0	3	0	0	0
12	GK	(China) CHN	Chen Zhao	0	0	0	0	0	0
13	MF	(Colombia) COL	Fredy Guarín	4	1	4	1	0	0
14	DF	(China) CHN	Sun Kai	0	0	0	0	0	0
15	FW	(China) CHN	Zhu Jianrong	2	0	0+2	0	0	0
16	DF	(China) CHN	Li Yunqiu	0	0	0	0	0	0
17	MF	(China) CHN	Wu Yizhen	4	0	2+2	0	0	0
18	FW	(China) CHN	Gao Di	1	0	0+1	0	0	0
19	MF	(China) CHN	Zhan Yilin	2	0	1+1	0	0	0
21	MF	(China) CHN	Xu Haoyang	0	0	0	0	0	0
23	DF	(China) CHN	Bai Jiajun	1	0	1	0	0	0
26	MF	(China) CHN	Alexander N'Doumbou	4	0	4	0	0	0
27	GK	(China) CHN	Li Shuai	5	0	5	0	0	0
28	MF	(China) CHN	Cao Yunding	5	0	5	0	0	0
29	MF	(China) CHN	Zhou Junchen	1	0	0+1	0	0	0
31	MF	(China) CHN	Wang Wei	5	0	5	0	0	0
32	DF	(China) CHN	Aidi Fulangxisi	2	0	2	0	0	0
33	MF	(China) CHN	Wang Haijian	0	0	0	0	0	0
36	MF	(China) CHN	Liu Ruofan	0	0	0	0	0	0
37	MF	(China) CHN	Sun Shilin	1	0	1	0	0	0
39	MF	(China) CHN	Cong Zhen	6	0	5+1	0	0	0
Players who away from the club on loan:
Players who left Shanghai Greenland Shenhua during the season:

=== Goal scorers ===
Place	Position	Nation	Number	Name	Super League	FA Cup	Total
1	FW	(Nigeria)	9	Odion Ighalo	6	0	6
2	MF	(Colombia)	10	Giovanni Moreno	2	0	2
3	MF	(China)	8	Zhang Lu	1	0	1
3	MF	(Colombia)	13	Fredy Guarín	1	0	1
				TOTALS	10	0	10

=== Assists ===
Place	Position	Nation	Number	Name	Super League	FA Cup	Total
1	MF	(China)	31	Wang Wei	2	0	2
1	MF	(Colombia)	13	Fredy Guarín	2	0	2
1	MF	(China)	28	Cao Yunding	2	0	2
4	MF	(Colombia)	10	Giovanni Moreno	1	0	1
				TOTALS	7	0	7

=== Disciplinary record ===
Number	Nation	Position	Name	Super League			FA Cup			Total		
Number	Nation	Position	Name	Yellow card	(yellow card) (yellow-red card)	Red card	Yellow card	(yellow card) (yellow-red card)	Red card	Yellow card	(yellow card) (yellow-red card)	Red card
8	(China)	MF	Zhang Lu	1	0	0	0	0	0	1	0	0
9	(Nigeria)	FW	Odion Ighalo	1	0	0	0	0	0	1	0	0
18	(China)	FW	Gao Di	1	0	0	0	0	0	1	0	0
23	(China)	DF	Bai Jiajun	1	0	1	0	0	0	1	0	1
28	(China)	MF	Cao Yunding	1	0	0	0	0	0	1	0	0
39	(China)	MF	Cong Zhen	2	0	0	0	0	0	2	0	0
			Total	7	0	1	0	0	0	7	0	1
