= Zhou Junchen =

Chinese footballer

Zhou Junchen 周俊辰
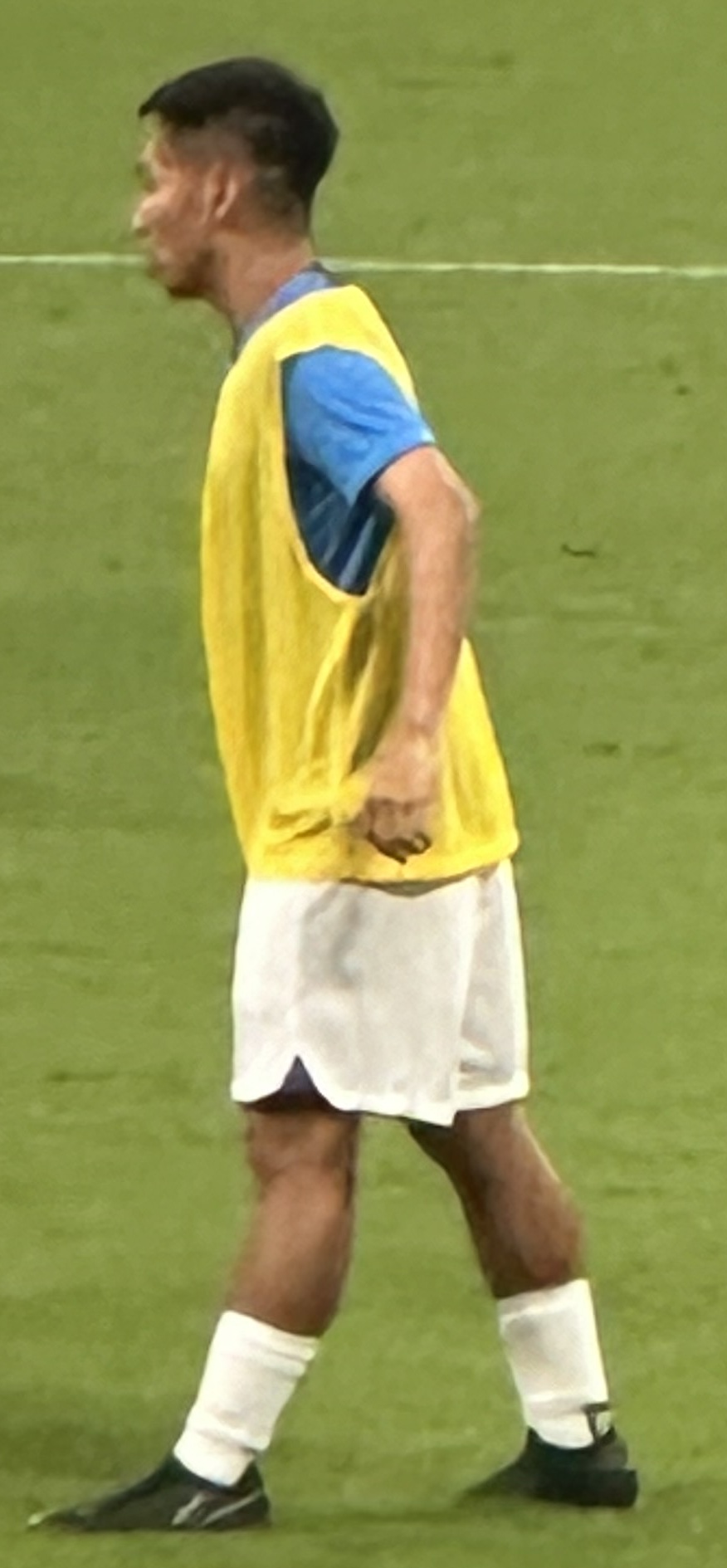
- Zhou Junchen in August 2024

Personal information
- Full name: Zhou Junchen
- Date of birth: 23 March 2000 (age 26)
- Place of birth: Shanghai, China
- Height: 1.72 m (5 ft 7 1/2 in)
- Position: Winger

Team information
- Current team: Ningbo FC
- Number: 17

Youth career
- 2011–2018: Genbao Football Base
- 2018: Shanghai Shenhua

Senior career*
Years	Team	Apps	(Gls)
2018–2025	Shanghai Shenhua	28	(0)
2020–2021	→ Qingdao FC (loan)	34	(2)
2025	→ Changchun Yatai (loan)	7	(0)
2026–	Ningbo FC	0	(0)

International career^{‡}
2017–2018	China U19	7	(2)
- * Club domestic league appearances and goals as of 1 November 2025 ‡ National team caps and goals as of 8 September 2018

Zhou Junchen (Chinese: 周俊辰; pinyin: Zhōu Jùnchén; born 23 March 2000) is a Chinese footballer who currently plays as a winger for Ningbo FC.

== Club career ==
Zhou Junchen joined Chinese Super League side Shanghai Shenhua's youth academy in March 2018 when Shenhua bought Genbao Football Base's U19 teams. He was promoted to the first team squad in the summer break of 2018. On 18 July 2018, Zhou made his senior debut in a league match against Tianjin Teda, replacing Cao Yunding in the 80th minute, making him the second player born in the new millennium to make an appearance in the Chinese Super League (after Zhang Aokai in 2016). He assisted Demba Ba's winning goal one minute after coming on as a substitute.

While on duty representing the China U20 team for the GSB Bangkok Cup, Zhou would be in violation for breaking the national teams discipline on 8 September 2018. On 17 September 2018, he was banned from the national team and suspended for one year from 9 September 2018 to 8 September 2019 for all competitions organized by the Chinese Football Association. On 11 April 2019 his suspension was dropped after he apologised for going out for dinner and breaking the teams curfew without permission while on international duty. On 12 April 2019 he made his return for Shenhua in a league game against Guangzhou R&F as a late substitute for Wang Wei, which ended in a 2-1 defeat. On 28 February 2020 he joined newly promoted Qingdao Huanghai on loan for the start of the 2020 Chinese Super League.

On 28 January 2025, Zhou was loaned out to Changchun Yatai for 2025 Chinese Super League season.

On 27 February 2026, Zhou joined China League One club Ningbo FC.

== Career statistics ==
As of 1 November 2025.

Appearances and goals by club, season and competition
Club	Season	League			National Cup		Continental		Other		Total	
Club	Season	Division	Apps	Goals	Apps	Goals	Apps	Goals	Apps	Goals	Apps	Goals
Shanghai Shenhua	2018	Chinese Super League	6	0	0	0	0	0	0 (Note: Appearances in Chinese FA Super Cup)	0	6	0
Shanghai Shenhua	2019	Chinese Super League	6	0	1	0	-		-		7	0
Shanghai Shenhua	2020	Chinese Super League	-		-		1	0	-		1	0
Shanghai Shenhua	2022	Chinese Super League	13	0	4	1	-		-		17	1
Shanghai Shenhua	2023	Chinese Super League	2	0	1	0	-		-		3	0
Shanghai Shenhua	2024	Chinese Super League	1	0	1	0	0	0	0	0	2	0
Shanghai Shenhua	Total		28	0	7	1	1	0	0	0	36	1
Qingdao Huanghai (loan)	2020	Chinese Super League	17	1	1	0	-		-		18	1
Qingdao FC (loan)	2021	Chinese Super League	17	1	0	0	-		2 (Note: Appearances Promotion/Relegation Play-offs)	0	19	1
Changchun Yatai (loan)	2025	Chinese Super League	7	0	0	0	-		-		7	0
Career total			69	2	8	0	1	0	2	0	80	3

== Honours ==
=== Club ===
Shanghai Shenhua

- Chinese FA Cup: 2019
- Chinese FA Super Cup: 2024
