= Sun Kai =

Chinese footballer

Sun Kai 孙凯
Personal information
- Date of birth: 26 March 1991 (age 35)
- Place of birth: Shanghai, China
- Height: 1.80 m (5 ft 11 in)
- Positions: Left-back; left winger

Youth career
- 2000–2006: Genbao Football Academy

Senior career*
Years	Team	Apps	(Gls)
2007–2013	Shanghai East Asia	63	(0)
2014–2016	Shanghai Shenxin	47	(0)
2017–2020	Shanghai Shenhua	5	(0)
2021-2022	Chongqing Liangjiang	14	(1)
2022	→ Zibo Cuju (loan)	3	(0)
- * Club domestic league appearances and goals as of 29 April 2022

Sun Kai (Chinese: 孙凯; pinyin: Sūn Kǎi; born 26 March 1991 in Shanghai) is a Chinese former footballer who played as a left-back or left winger.

On 10 September 2024, Chinese Football Association announced that Sun was banned from football-related activities for lifetime for involving in match-fixing.

== Club career ==
Born in Shanghai, Sun joined Genbao Football Academy in July 2000. He was promoted to academy's first team Shanghai East Asia squad in 2007 and followed Shanghai East Asia to win promotion to the second tier. He didn't play as a regular starter until 2011, when some regular players such as Wang Jiayu, Cao Yunding, Jiang Zhipeng and Zhang Linpeng left the club. Appearing in 21 league match, he was selected into best squad of 2011 League One season by Sina. Sun made 22 league appearances in the 2012 season, as Shanghai East Asia won the champions and promoted to the top flight. In January 2014, Sun was signed for fellow Chinese Super League side Shanghai Shenxin.

Sun joined Shanghai Shenhua at the beginning of the 2017 league season, however was unable to register for league matches due to the club having reached their maximum transfer slot limit and he played for reserve team instead. On 7 February 2018, Shanghai Shenhua officially announced Sun's inclusion in the club's first team. He made his debut for Shenhua on 7 March 2018 in a 1–1 away draw against Korean club Suwon Samsung Bluewings in the 2018 AFC Champions League. Sun would make his league debut for the club the following season on 15 August 2019 against Tianjin Tianhai F.C. in a 2-2 draw.

== Career statistics ==
Statistics accurate as of match played 31 December 2020.

Appearances and goals by club, season and competition
Club	Season	League			National Cup		Continental		Other		Total	
Club	Season	Division	Apps	Goals	Apps	Goals	Apps	Goals	Apps	Goals	Apps	Goals
Shanghai East Asia	2007	China League Two			-		-		-			
Shanghai East Asia	2008	China League One	1	0	-		-		-		1	0
Shanghai East Asia	2009	China League One	0	0	-		-		-		0	0
Shanghai East Asia	2010	China League One	2	0	-		-		-		2	0
Shanghai East Asia	2011	China League One	21	0	2	0	-		-		23	0
Shanghai East Asia	2012	China League One	22	0	0	0	-		-		22	0
Shanghai East Asia	2013	Chinese Super League	17	0	2	0	-		-		19	0
Shanghai East Asia	Total		63	0	4	0	0	0	0	0	67	0
Shanghai Shenxin	2014	Chinese Super League	25	0	2	0	-		-		27	0
Shanghai Shenxin	2015	Chinese Super League	20	0	0	0	-		-		20	0
Shanghai Shenxin	2016	China League One	2	0	2	0	-		-		4	0
Shanghai Shenxin	Total		47	0	4	0	0	0	0	0	51	0
Shanghai Greenland Shenhua	2018	Chinese Super League	0	0	1	0	3	0	0 (Note: Appearances in Chinese FA Super Cup)	0	4	0
Shanghai Greenland Shenhua	2019	Chinese Super League	3	0	3	0	-		-		6	0
Shanghai Greenland Shenhua	2020	Chinese Super League	2	0	1	0	0	0	-		3	0
Shanghai Greenland Shenhua	Total		5	0	5	0	3	0	0	0	13	0
Career total			115	0	13	0	3	0	0	0	131	0

== Honours ==
=== Club ===
Shanghai East Asia

- China League One: 2012
- China League Two: 2007

Shanghai Shenhua

- Chinese FA Cup: 2019
