= Óscar Romero (footballer) =

Paraguayan footballer (born 1992)

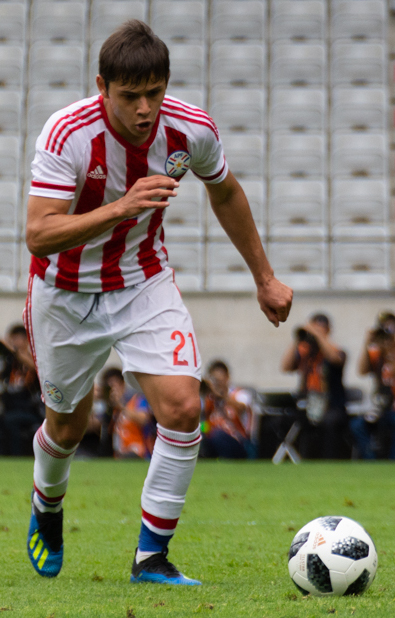
- Romero with Paraguay in 2018

Personal information
- Full name: Óscar David Romero Villamayor
- Date of birth: 4 July 1992 (age 34)
- Place of birth: Fernando de la Mora, Paraguay
- Height: 1.76 m (5 ft 9 in)
- Position: Attacking midfielder

Team information
- Current team: Huracán
- Number: 10

Youth career
- 2005–2011: Cerro Porteño

Senior career*
Years	Team	Apps	(Gls)
2011–2014	Cerro Porteño	90	(13)
2015–2016	Racing Club	47	(9)
2017–2019	Shanghai Shenhua	26	(4)
2017	→ Alavés (loan)	18	(0)
2019–2021	San Lorenzo	46	(5)
2022–2023	Boca Juniors	44	(4)
2023	Pendikspor	12	(3)
2024	Botafogo	19	(1)
2025	Internacional	17	(0)
2026–	Huracán	12	(2)

International career^{‡}
2013–	Paraguay	55	(4)
- * Club domestic league appearances and goals as of 17:34, 6 July 2026 (UTC) ‡ National team caps and goals as of 16:30, 27 January 2022 (UTC)

Óscar David Romero Villamayor (Spanish pronunciation: [ˈoskaɾ roˈmeɾo]; born 4 July 1992) is a Paraguayan professional footballer who plays as an attacking midfielder for Primera División club Huracán and the Paraguay national team. He is the twin brother of Ángel Romero.

== Career ==
Romero was in the youth ranks of Boca Juniors when he was a Sub 15, but could not continue at the club for a matter of paperwork, therefore he did not play for the Xeneize.

=== Cerro Porteño ===
Romero joined the youth ranks of Cerro Porteño at the age of 14. He debuted in the First Division of Paraguay on 15 May 2011 in a 1–0 defeat against General Caballero SC of Zeballos Cue. He scored his first goal on 1 December 2012 against Sportivo Luqueño. His good performances attracted many European teams, such as Spanish clubs Real Madrid B and Valencia Football Club.

In 2013, like his brother Angel, he had more opportunities, since the club decided to give chance to the youth. With the new DT Francisco Arce, Oscar impressed, attracting interest from clubs like Baniyas SC of United Arab Emirates and also being summoned to the Selection Paraguay.

In October 2014, after his good performances in the knockout round of the Copa Sudamericana against Lanús Argentina, in which he scored three goals, he was said to be worth $3 to 6 million. He was targeted by major European clubs, such as Atlético Madrid.

=== Racing Club ===
On 28 January 2015, Romero was signed by Racing Club for $2.7 million. He debuted on 18 February against Deportivo Tachira in Copa Libertadores. On 13 March 2015, Romero scored his first competitive goal for the club against Club Atlético Colón. On 15 August 2015, Romero scored his second goal against Union de Santa Fe.

=== Shanghai Shenhua ===
Romero played for Shanghai Shenhua of the Chinese Super League from 2017 to 2019. He won one title with the club; the Chinese FA Cup in 2019.

=== San Lorenzo ===
In 2019, San Lorenzo signed Romero on a two-year contract. He left the club in 2021.

=== Boca Juniors ===
Romero joined Boca Juniors in February 2022 on a free transfer, and signed a two-year contract.

=== Pendikspor ===
On 9 August 2023, he signed with Süper Lig club Pendikspor.

=== Botafogo ===
On March 18, 2024, he was announced by Botafogo with a contract until the end of the season. The player received the number 70 shirt to play for the club. On April 2, the Paraguayan was listed for the first time, for the match against Junior Barranquilla in the Libertadores. The Paraguayan debuted against the Colombians at Nilton Santos. Romero entered in the 39th minute of the final stage, replacing Marlon Freitas.

On May 13, 2024, after an act of indiscipline, Óscar Romero was cut from Botafogo's trip to Peru, where the team would face Universitario in the fifth round of Group D of the Libertadores group stage. According to the specialized press, the midfielder took, along with clubmate Diego Hernández, women to the concentration after the match against Fortaleza.

The following day, the Paraguayan spoke out, saying he accepted Botafogo's punishment, but denied that he had taken women to the team hotel.

=== Internacional ===
At the end of February 2025, Romero joined a fellow Brazilian side Internacional with one-year contract.

== Career statistics ==
=== Club ===
As of match played 3 June 2026

Appearances and goals by club, season and competition
Club	Season	League			National cup (Note: Includes Copa Argentina, Copa del Rey, Chinese FA Cup, Turkish Cup, Copa do Brasil)		Continental		Other		Total	
Club	Season	Division	Apps	Goals	Apps	Goals	Apps	Goals	Apps	Goals	Apps	Goals
Cerro Porteño	2011	Paraguayan Primera División	10	1	—		0	0	—		10	1
Cerro Porteño	2012	Paraguayan Primera División	7	1	—		—		—		7	1
Cerro Porteño	2013	Paraguayan Primera División	35	6	—		8 (Note: Six appearances in Copa Libertadores, two appearances in Copa Sudamericana)	0	—		43	6
Cerro Porteño	2014	Paraguayan Primera División	38	5	—		16 (Note: Eight appearances in Copa Libertadores, eight appearances and four goals in Copa Sudamericana)	4	—		54	9
Cerro Porteño	Total		90	13	—		24	4	—		114	17
Racing Club	2015	Argentine Primera División	24	4	4	0	8 (Note: Appearances in Copa Libertadores)	0	—		36	4
Racing Club	2016	Argentine Primera División	10	4	2	1	10	1	—		22	6
Racing Club	2016–17	Argentine Primera División	13	1	0	0	—		—		13	1
Racing Club	Total		47	9	6	1	18	1	—		71	11
Alavés (loan)	2016–17	La Liga	13	0	2	0	—		—		15	0
Alavés (loan)	2017–18	La Liga	5	0	0	0	—		—		5	0
Alavés (loan)	Total		18	0	2	0	—		—		20	0
Shanghai Shenhua	2018	Chinese Super League	17	4	0	0	0	0	—		17	4
Shanghai Shenhua	2019	Chinese Super League	9	0	2	2	—		—		11	2
Shanghai Shenhua	Total		26	4	2	2	0	0	–		28	6
San Lorenzo	2019–20	Argentine Primera División	21	2	1	2	—		1 (Note: Appearance in Copa de la Superliga)	2	23	6
San Lorenzo	2020–21	Argentine Primera División	8	2	0	0	7 (Note: Two appearances in Copa Libertadores, five appearances and one goal in Copa Sudamericana)	1	—		15	3
San Lorenzo	2021	Argentine Primera División	17	1	0	0	—		—		17	1
San Lorenzo	Total		46	5	1	2	7	1	1	2	55	10
Boca Juniors	2022	Argentine Primera División	32	2	4	0	8	0	1 (Note: Appearance in Trofeo de Campeones de la Liga Profesional)	0	45	2
Boca Juniors	2023	Argentine Primera División	16	2	0	0	3	0	1 (Note: Appearance in Supercopa Argentina)	0	20	2
Boca Juniors	Total		48	4	4	0	11	0	2	0	65	4
Pendikspor	2023–24	Süper Lig	12	3	2	1	—		—		14	4
Botafogo	2024	Série A	19	1	2	0	6	0	—		28	1
Internacional	2025	Série A	17	0	2	1	1	0	—		20	1
Huracán	2026	Argentine Primera División	12	2	2	1	—		—		14	3
Career total			335	41	23	8	67	6	3	2	429	57

=== International ===
Scores and results list Paraguay's goal tally first.

Goal	Date	Venue	Opponent	Score	Result	Competition
1.	29 May 2014	Kufstein Arena, Kufstein, Austria	Cameroon	1–0	2–1	Friendly
2.	1 September 2016	Estadio Defensores del Chaco, Asunción, Paraguay	Chile	1–0	2–1	2018 FIFA World Cup qualification
3.	12 June 2018	Tivoli-Neu, Innsbruck, Austria	Japan	1–0	2–4	Friendly
4.	10 September 2019	Amman International Stadium, Amman, Jordan	Jordan	1–2	4–2	Friendly
Correct as of 10 September 2019

== Honours ==
Cerro Porteño

- Primera División: 2012 Apertura, 2013 Clausura

Shanghai Shenhua

- Chinese FA Cup: 2019

Boca Juniors

- Primera División: 2022
- Copa de la Liga Profesional: 2022
- Supercopa Argentina: 2022

Botafogo

- Campeonato Brasileiro Série A: 2024
- Copa Libertadores: 2024
