= Bai Shuo =

Chinese association football player

Personal information
- Date of birth: 6 January 1995 (age 31)
- Place of birth: Shijiazhuang, Hebei, China
- Height: 1.90 m (6 ft 3 in)
- Position: Goalkeeper

Youth career
- –2014: Tianjin TEDA
- 2015: Shanghai Shenhua

Senior career*
Years	Team	Apps	(Gls)
2015–2016	Shanghai Shenhua	0	(0)
2015–2016	→ Atlético Museros (loan)	12	(0)
2016	→ Shanghai JuJu Sports (loan)	1	(0)
2017	Shanghai JuJu Sports	8	(0)
2018–2021	Inner Mongolia Caoshangfei	67	(0)
2023–2024	Hunan Billows	27	(0)
2025	Shanxi Chongde Ronghai	5	(0)
- * Club domestic league appearances and goals as of 14:01, 18 May 2022 (UTC)

Bai Shuo (Chinese: 白烁; born 6 January 1995) is a Chinese footballer who plays as a goalkeeper.

== Career statistics ==
=== Club ===
As of 22 February 2022.

Club	Season	League			Cup		Continental		Other		Total	
Club	Season	Division	Apps	Goals	Apps	Goals	Apps	Goals	Apps	Goals	Apps	Goals
Shanghai Shenhua	2015	Chinese Super League	0	0	0	0	0	0	0	0	0	0
Shanghai Shenhua	2016	Chinese Super League	0	0	0	0	0	0	0	0	0	0
Shanghai Shenhua	Total		0	0	0	0	0	0	0	0	0	0
Atlético Museros (loan)	2015–16	Preferente Valenciana	12	0	0	0	–		0	0	12	0
Shanghai JuJu Sports (loan)	2016	China League Two	1	0	0	0	–		0	0	1	0
Shanghai JuJu Sports	2017	China League Two	8	0	0	0	–		0	0	8	0
Shanghai JuJu Sports	Total		9	0	0	0	0	0	0	0	9	0
Inner Mongolia Caoshangfei	2018	China League Two	25	0	0	0	–		0	0	25	0
Inner Mongolia Caoshangfei	2019	China League Two	20	0	0	0	–		2 (Note: Appearances in the China League Two playoffs)	0	22	0
Inner Mongolia Caoshangfei	2020	China League Two	9	0	0	0	–		0	0	9	0
Inner Mongolia Caoshangfei	2021	China League Two	11	0	0	0	–		0	0	11	0
Inner Mongolia Caoshangfei	2022	China League Two	0	0	0	0	–		0	0	0	0
Inner Mongolia Caoshangfei	Total		65	0	0	0	0	0	2	0	67	0
Career total			86	0	0	0	0	0	2	0	88	0
