= Li Xiaoming =

Chinese footballer

Li Xiaoming 李晓明
Personal information
- Full name: Li Xiaoming
- Date of birth: 19 January 1996 (age 30)
- Place of birth: Shanghai, China
- Height: 1.83 m (6 ft 0 in)
- Position: Centre back

Youth career
- 2010–2012: Shanghai Luckystar
- 2013–2015: Shanghai Shenhua

Senior career*
Years	Team	Apps	(Gls)
2015	→ CF Crack's (loan)	10	(0)
2015–2018	Shanghai Shenhua	9	(0)
2016	→ Henan Jianye (loan)	21	(1)
2017	→ Shenzhen FC (loan)	23	(0)
2019–2020	Changchun Yatai	12	(0)
2019	→ Nantong Zhiyun (loan)	8	(0)
2020	→ Suzhou Dongwu (loan)	5	(0)
2021–2022	Suzhou Dongwu	47	(2)
2023	Yunnan Yukun	6	(0)
2025–2026	Shanghai Second	1	(0)

International career
2014–2015	China U19	6	(0)
2016–2018	China U23	17	(1)
- * Club domestic league appearances and goals as of 31 December 2020

Li Xiaoming (simplified Chinese: 李晓明; traditional Chinese: 李曉明; pinyin: Lǐ Xiǎomíng; born 19 January 1996) is a Chinese footballer.

== Club career ==
Li Xiaoming was born in Shanghai. He started his professional football career in January 2015 when he was loaned to Shanghai Shenhua's satellite team CF Crack's in the Primera Regional de la Comunidad Valenciana. He returned to Shanghai Shenhua in July 2015. On 15 January 2016, he was loaned to Chinese Super League side Henan Jianye for one plus one year as part of Bi Jinhao's transfer deal. On 5 March 2016, Li made his Super League debut in the first match of 2016 season against Shanghai SIPG. He scored his first senior goal on 6 May 2016 in a 4–3 away defeat against Hebei China Fortune. He played 21 league matches in the 2016 season and won the title of Chinese Football Association Young Player of the Year Award. Li's loan deal at Henan was ended in advance at the end of 2016 season. He was loaned to China League One side Shenzhen FC for one season on 28 February 2017. In January 2018, Li returned to Shanghai Shenhua for the 2018 season. On 2 March 2018, he made his debut for the club in a 1–1 home draw against Changchun Yatai, coming on for Sun Shilin in the 86th minute.

On 14 February 2019, Li transferred to newly-relegated China League One side Changchun Yatai. After a mistake-filled 12-match spell at the club, Li was sent out on loan to fellow second-tier side Nantong Zhiyun, then-managed by Englishman Gary White.

On 23 October 2020, Li loaned to Suzhou Dongwu.

== Career statistics ==
As of 31 December 2025.

Appearances and goals by club, season and competition
Club	Season	League			National Cup		Continental		Other		Total	
Club	Season	Division	Apps	Goals	Apps	Goals	Apps	Goals	Apps	Goals	Apps	Goals
CF Crack's (loan)	2014-15	Primera Regional de Valencia	10	0	-		-		-		10	0
Shanghai Shenhua	2015	Chinese Super League	0	0	0	0	-		-		0	0
Shanghai Shenhua	2018	Chinese Super League	9	0	0	0	2	0	1 (Note: Appearances in Chinese FA Super Cup)	0	12	0
Shanghai Shenhua	Total		9	0	0	0	2	0	1	0	12	0
Henan Jianye (loan)	2016	Chinese Super League	21	1	2	0	-		-		23	1
Shenzhen FC (loan)	2017	China League One	23	0	2	0	-		-		25	0
Changchun Yatai	2019	China League One	12	0	1	0	-		-		13	0
Nantong Zhiyun (loan)	2019	China League One	8	0	0	0	-		-		8	0
Suzhou Dongwu (loan)	2020	China League One	5	0	1	0	-		-		6	0
Suzhou Dongwu	2021	China League One	23	0	1	0	-		-		24	0
Suzhou Dongwu	2022	China League One	24	2	0	0	-		-		24	2
Suzhou Dongwu	Total		47	2	1	0	0	0	0	0	48	2
Yunnan Yukun	2023	China League Two	6	0	2	0	-		-		8	0
Shanghai Tongji	2025	CMCL	0	0	0	0	-		-		0	0
Shanghai Second	2025	CMCL	1	0	0	0	-		-		1	0
Career total			142	3	9	0	2	0	1	0	154	3

== Honours ==
=== Individual ===
- Chinese Football Association Young Player of the Year: 2016
