= Xu Haoyang =

Chinese footballer

Xu Haoyang 徐皓阳
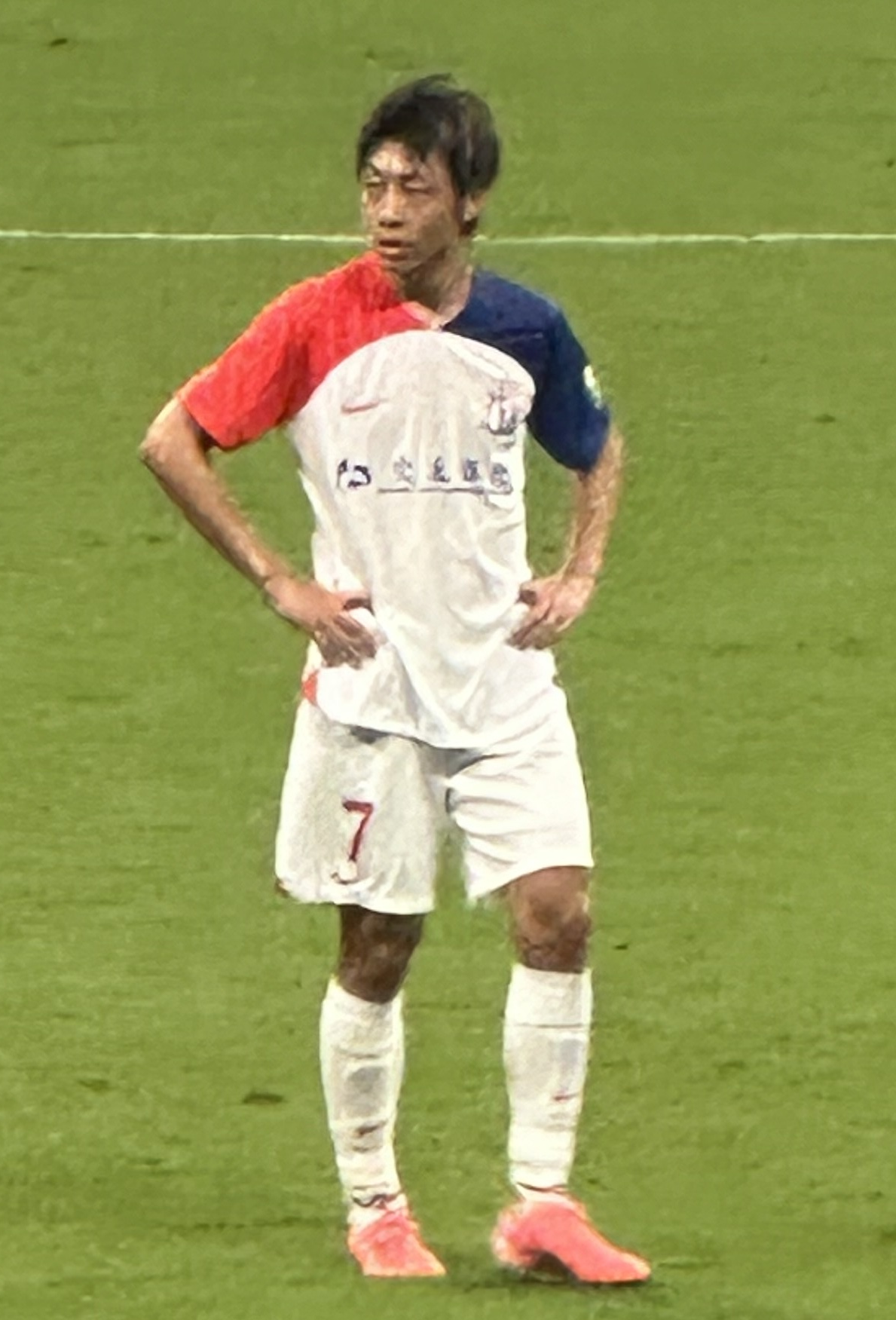
- Xu Haoyang in August 2024

Personal information
- Full name: Xu Haoyang
- Date of birth: 15 January 1999 (age 27)
- Place of birth: Dazhou, Sichuan, China
- Height: 1.80 m (5 ft 11 in)
- Position: Winger

Team information
- Current team: Shanghai Shenhua
- Number: 21

Youth career
- 2009–2018: Genbao Football Base
- 2018: Shanghai Shenhua

Senior career*
Years	Team	Apps	(Gls)
2018–	Shanghai Shenhua	106	(6)
2020	→ Beijing BSU (loan)	14	(2)
2021	→ Wuhan Three Towns (loan)	30	(1)
2022	→ Wuhan Three Towns (loan)	26	(1)

International career^{‡}
2016	China U16	3	(0)
2017–2018	China U19	14	(2)
2023	China U23	7	(0)
2024–	China	9	(0)
Medal record
Representing China
Men's football
EAFF Championship
Bronze medal – third place	2025 South Korea	Team
- * Club domestic league appearances and goals as of 19 November 2026 ‡ National team caps and goals as of 6 June 2024

Xu Haoyang (Chinese: 徐皓阳; pinyin: Xú Hàoyáng; born 15 January 1999) is a Chinese footballer who plays for Shanghai Shenhua and the China national team.

== Club career ==
=== Shanghai Shenghua ===
Xu joined Chinese Super League side Shanghai Shenhua's youth academy in March 2018 when Shenhua bought Genbao Football Base's U19 teams. He was promoted to the first team squad in the summer break of 2018. On 22 September 2018, he made his senior debut in a 2–1 away defeat against Dalian Yifang, coming on as a substitute for Sun Shilin in the 89th minute.

==== Beijing BSU (loan) ====
On 11 September 2021 he was loaned out to second tier football club Beijing BSU for the 2020 China League One season. He would go on to score his first club goal on 15 October 2020 in a league game against Suzhou Dongwu in a 4–0 victory.

==== Wuhan Three Towns (loan) ====
The following season Xu was loaned out again to another second tier football club Wuhan Three Towns on 12 April 2021. He would go on to establish himself as regular within the team that won the division and promotion to the top tier at the end of the 2021 China League One campaign. The following season he would extend his loan with the club and go on to win the 2022 Chinese Super League title.

== International career ==
Xu made his debut for the China national team on 6 June 2024 in a 2026 FIFA World Cup qualifier against Thailand. He started the game and was substituted after 68 minutes as the game ended in a 1–1 draw.

== Career statistics ==
As of match played 22 November 2025.

Appearances and goals by club, season and competition
Club	Season	League			National Cup		Continental		Other		Total	
Club	Season	Division	Apps	Goals	Apps	Goals	Apps	Goals	Apps	Goals	Apps	Goals
Shanghai Shenhua	2018	Chinese Super League	1	0	0	0	0	0	0 (Note: Appearances in Chinese FA Super Cup)	0	1	0
Shanghai Shenhua	2019	Chinese Super League	0	0	0	0	-		-		0	0
Shanghai Shenhua	2023	Chinese Super League	25	1	5	0	-		-		30	1
Shanghai Shenhua	2024	Chinese Super League	29	2	3	0	6 (Note: Appearances in AFC Champions League Elite)	0	1	0	39	2
Shanghai Shenhua	2025	Chinese Super League	26	1	3	0	7	0	0	0	36	1
Shanghai Shenhua	2026	Chinese Super League	0	0	0	0	0	0	-		0	0
Shanghai Shenhua	Total		80	4	11	0	13	0	1	0	105	4
Beijing BSU (loan)	2020	China League One	14	2	0	0	-		-		14	2
Wuhan Three Towns (loan)	2021	China League One	30	1	1	0	-		-		31	1
Wuhan Three Towns (loan)	2022	Chinese Super League	26	1	0	0	-		-		26	1
Wuhan Three Towns (loan)	Total		56	2	1	0	0	0	0	0	57	2
Career total			151	8	12	0	13	0	1	0	177	8

== Honours ==
=== Club ===
Wuhan Three Towns

- Chinese Super League: 2022
- China League One: 2021

Shanghai Shenhua

- Chinese FA Cup: 2023
- Chinese FA Super Cup: 2024, 2025
