= Zhu Jianrong =

Chinese footballer

Zhu Jianrong 朱建荣
Personal information
- Full name: 朱建荣
- Date of birth: 12 July 1991 (age 35)
- Place of birth: Qingdao, China
- Height: 1.85 m (6 ft 1 in)
- Position: Forward

Youth career
- 2005–2008: Qingdao Jonoon

Senior career*
Years	Team	Apps	(Gls)
2009–2016	Qingdao Jonoon	159	(23)
2017–2022	Shanghai Shenhua	58	(15)
2020	→ Qingdao Huanghai (loan)	16	(4)
2021	→ Qingdao FC (loan)	13	(2)
Total		246	(44)

International career
2010	China U-20	4	(1)
- * Club domestic league appearances and goals as of 31 January 2023

Zhu Jianrong (Chinese: 朱建荣; born 12 July 1991 in Qingdao) is a Chinese former football player who played as a forward.

On 10 September 2024, the Chinese Football Association announced that Zhu was banned from football-related activities for a lifetime for involving in match-fixing.

== Club career ==
Zhu Jianrong started his professional football career with Qingdao Jonoon where he made his senior club debut on 23 March 2009 in a league match against Hangzhou Greentown, but his team lost 1-2. Over the course of the season he primarily used as a substitute. The following season, Zhu scored his first goal for the club in a league game played on 17 April 2010 against Liaoning Whowin that ended in a 3-3 draw. Zhu would go on to establish himself as a vital member the team until the club were relegated to the second tier at the end of the 2013 Chinese Super League season. Despite this he remained loyal to the team until the club were found guilty on breaking the Chinese FA's rules on contract extensions, resulting in a 7 point deduction that severely hindered the club's promotion push in the 2014 league season. By the 2016 league season the club were heading for relegation and Zhu decided to leave the team.

On 1 December 2016, Zhu moved to Super League side Shanghai Shenhua. He would make his debut for the club on 20 May 2017 coming on as a late substitute for Sun Shilin in a 3-1 defeat to local rivals Shanghai SIPG F.C. Throughout the season he was used sparingly, however he would score his first goal for the club in a 5-1 victory against Yanbian Funde F.C. on 29 October 2017.

== International career ==
Zhu Jianrong was called up to the U-20 Chinese squad that took part in the 2010 AFC U-19 Championship, where he played in four games, scoring one goal in a tournament that saw China reach the quarter-finals.

== Career statistics ==
Statistics accurate as of match played 31 January 2023

Appearances and goals by club, season and competition
Club	Season	League			National Cup		Continental		Other		Total	
Club	Season	Division	Apps	Goals	Apps	Goals	Apps	Goals	Apps	Goals	Apps	Goals
Qingdao Jonoon	2009	Chinese Super League	13	0	-		-		-		13	0
Qingdao Jonoon	2010	Chinese Super League	22	3	-		-		-		22	3
Qingdao Jonoon	2011	Chinese Super League	23	6	1	0	-		-		24	6
Qingdao Jonoon	2012	Chinese Super League	20	3	1	0	-		-		21	3
Qingdao Jonoon	2013	Chinese Super League	23	0	1	0	-		-		24	0
Qingdao Jonoon	2014	China League One	24	5	3	2	-		-		27	7
Qingdao Jonoon	2015	China League One	22	4	0	0	-		-		22	4
Qingdao Jonoon	2016	China League One	12	2	1	0	-		-		13	2
Qingdao Jonoon	Total		159	23	7	2	0	0	0	0	166	25
Shanghai Shenhua	2017	Chinese Super League	11	3	0	0	0	0	-		11	3
Shanghai Shenhua	2018	Chinese Super League	11	4	0	0	1	0	0 (Note: Appearances in Chinese FA Super Cup)	0	12	4
Shanghai Shenhua	2019	Chinese Super League	13	0	2	1	-		-		15	1
Shanghai Shenhua	2020	Chinese Super League	0	0	0	0	4	1	-		4	1
Shanghai Shenhua	2022	Chinese Super League	23	8	1	2	-		-		24	10
Shanghai Shenhua	Total		58	15	3	3	5	1	0	0	66	19
Qingdao Huanghai (loan)	2020	Chinese Super League	16	4	0	0	-		-		16	4
Qingdao (loan)	2021	Chinese Super League	13	2	1	3	-		2	0	16	5
Career total			246	44	11	8	1	0	2	0	264	53

== Honours ==
=== Club ===
Shanghai Shenhua

- Chinese FA Cup: 2017, 2019.
