= Liu Ruofan =

Chinese footballer

Liu Ruofan 刘若钒
Personal information
- Full name: Liu Ruofan
- Date of birth: 28 January 1999 (age 27)
- Place of birth: Nanchong, Sichuan, China
- Height: 1.86 m (6 ft 1 in)
- Position: Right winger

Team information
- Current team: Shanghai Port
- Number: 26

Youth career
- 2010–2015: Genbao Football Base
- 2015–2016: Shanghai Shenhua

Senior career*
| Years | Team | Apps | (Gls) |
| 2017–2023 | Shanghai Shenhua | 61 | (3) |
| 2020 | → Tianjin TEDA (loan) | 17 | (0) |
| 2021 | → Chengdu Rongcheng (loan) | 27 | (13) |
| 2024 | Wuhan Three Towns | 20 | (0) |
| 2025– | Shanghai Port | 36 | (5) |

International career^{‡}
| 2013–2016 | China U-16 | 24 | (17) |
| 2017–2018 | China U-19 | 18 | (7) |
| 2018–2023 | China U-23 | 7 | (2) |
Medal record
Representing China
Men's football
EAFF Championship
| Bronze medal – third place | 2022 Japan | Team |
- * Club domestic league appearances and goals as of 19 November 2026 ‡ National team caps and goals as of 15 January 2019

Liu Ruofan (simplified Chinese: 刘若钒; traditional Chinese: 劉若釩; pinyin: Liú Ruòfán; Mandarin pronunciation: [ljǒʊ ɻwô fǎn]; born 28 January 1999) is a Chinese professional footballer who currently plays for Chinese Super League club Shanghai Port.

== Club career ==
Liu Ruofan started his football career when he join the Genbao Football Base and then moved to the Shanghai Shenhua's youth academy in 2015. He received training with Inter Milan's youth academy in April 2016 and Villarreal CF's youth academy in September 2016. Liu was promoted to Shanghai Shenhua's first team squad in 2017 by then manager Gus Poyet. On 5 May 2017, he made his debut for the club in a 3-2 loss against Guangzhou Evergrande. On 19 November 2017, he assisted Obafemi Martins's winner in the first leg of the 2017 Chinese FA Cup final against city rivals Shanghai SIPG, which helped the club secure the title. He made six appearances in all competitions for the club in 2017 and won the Chinese Golden Boy award in December 2017. On 22 September 2018, he scored his first goal for the club in a 2-1 loss against Dalian Yifang.

On 26 February 2020, Liu was loaned to Tianjin TEDA for the 2020 Chinese Super League season. He made his debut for the club in a league game on 27 July 2020 against Shanghai Port in a 3-1 defeat. He would be loaned out again, this time to second tier club Chengdu Rongcheng on 13 April 2021. His debut appearance would be in a league game against Jiangxi Beidamen on 26 April 2021, in a 4-2 victory where he also scored his first goal for the club. He would go on to establish himself as an integral member within the team and aid the club to promotion to the top tier at the end of the 2021 league campaign.

On 27 January 2025, Liu signed Chinese Super League club Shanghai Port.

== International career ==
Liu scored four goals in three appearances during 2018 AFC U-19 Championship qualification in October 2017 as the Chinese under-20 national team qualified for the 2018 AFC U-19 Championship.

== Career statistics ==
As of 31 December 2024

Appearances and goals by club, season and competition
| Club | Season | League | | | National Cup | | Continental | | Other | | Total | |
| Club | Season | Division | Apps | Goals | Apps | Goals | Apps | Goals | Apps | Goals | Apps | Goals |
|---|---|---|---|---|---|---|---|---|---|---|---|---|
| Shanghai Shenhua | 2017 | Chinese Super League | 3 | 0 | 3 | 0 | 0 | 0 | - | | 6 | 0 |
| Shanghai Shenhua | 2018 | Chinese Super League | 24 | 1 | 0 | 0 | 2 | 0 | 1 (Note: Appearances in Chinese FA Super Cup) | 0 | 27 | 1 |
| Shanghai Shenhua | 2019 | Chinese Super League | 4 | 0 | 1 | 0 | - | | - | | 5 | 0 |
| Shanghai Shenhua | 2020 | Chinese Super League | 0 | 0 | 0 | 0 | 4 | 0 | - | | 4 | 0 |
| Shanghai Shenhua | 2022 | Chinese Super League | 25 | 2 | 1 | 2 | - | | - | | 26 | 4 |
| Shanghai Shenhua | 2023 | Chinese Super League | 5 | 0 | 1 | 0 | - | | - | | 6 | 0 |
| Shanghai Shenhua | Total | | 61 | 3 | 6 | 2 | 6 | 0 | 1 | 0 | 74 | 5 |
| Tianjin TEDA (loan) | 2020 | Chinese Super League | 17 | 0 | 0 | 0 | - | | - | | 17 | 0 |
| Chengdu Rongcheng (loan) | 2021 | China League One | 27 | 13 | 3 | 0 | - | | 2 (Note: Appearances in 2021 CSL Relegation play-offs) | 0 | 32 | 13 |
| Wuhan Three Towns | 2024 | Chinese Super League | 20 | 0 | 0 | 0 | - | | - | | 20 | 0 |
| Career total | | | 125 | 16 | 9 | 2 | 6 | 0 | 3 | 0 | 143 | 18 |

== Honours ==
=== Club ===
Shanghai Shenhua

- Chinese FA Cup: 2017, 2019

Shanghai Port

- Chinese Super League: 2025

=== Individual ===
- Chinese Golden Boy: 2017
