= Zhu Chenjie =

Chinese footballer (born 2000)

Zhu Chenjie 朱辰杰
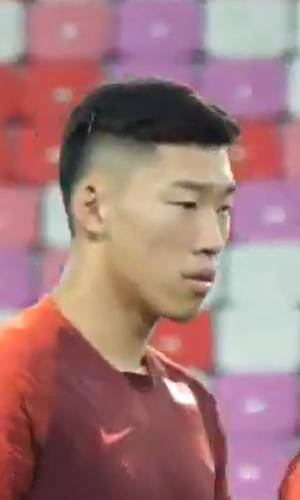
- Zhu Chenjie in September 2019

Personal information
- Full name: Zhu Chenjie
- Date of birth: 23 August 2000 (age 26)
- Place of birth: Shanghai, China
- Height: 1.85 m (6 ft 1 in)
- Position: Centre-back

Team information
- Current team: Shanghai Shenhua
- Number: 5

Youth career
- 2011–2018: Genbao Football Base
- 2018: Shanghai Shenhua

Senior career*
Years	Team	Apps	(Gls)
2018–	Shanghai Shenhua	185	(12)

International career^{‡}
2017–2018	China U19	18	(1)
2019–2023	China U23	6	(0)
2019–	China	42	(1)
2026	China U23 (wildcard)	6	(0)
Medal record
Representing China
Men's football
EAFF Championship
Bronze medal – third place	2022 Japan	Team
Bronze medal – third place	2025 South Korea	Team
Asian Games
Bronze medal – third place	2026 Aichi–Nagoya	Team
- * Club domestic league appearances and goals as of 19 November 2026 ‡ National team caps and goals as of 9 January 2025

Zhu Chenjie (simplified Chinese: 朱辰杰; traditional Chinese: 朱辰傑; pinyin: Zhū Chénjié; born 23 August 2000) is a Chinese professional footballer who plays for Chinese Super League club Shanghai Shenhua and the China national team.

== Club career ==
Zhu Chenjie started his football career when he transferred to Shanghai Shenhua's youth academy in March 2018 after the club bought Genbao Football Base's under-19 players. He was promoted to the first team squad in the 2018 season. Zhu made his debut for the club on 22 July 2018 in a 2–2 away draw against Henan Jianye. In doing so at 17 years and 333 days old, he became the youngest player ever to start for Shanghai Shenhua. On 30 September 2018, he scored his first senior goal in a 3–1 home win against Guangzhou R&F, becoming the youngest goalscorer ever for the club aged 18 years and 38 days as well as the first player born after 2000 to score in the Chinese Super League.

== International career ==
Zhu made his debut for the Chinese national team on 7 June 2019 in a 2–0 win against the Philippines, coming on as a substitute for Ji Xiang in the 33rd minute. On 24 March 2022, Zhu scored his first international goal in a 1–1 draw against Saudi Arabia in the 2022 FIFA World Cup qualification, converting in a second-half penalty. He then became the first Chinese player born in the 21st century to debut, provide an assist and score a goal for the national team.

On 20 July 2022, Zhu captained the national team for the first time against South Korea in the 2022 EAFF E-1 Football Championship, however he inadvertently headed in an own goal in the first half of an eventual 3–0 defeat.

Zhu was named in China's squad for the 2023 AFC Asian Cup in Qatar and started the team's opening match against Tajikistan on 13 January 2024.

== Career statistics ==
=== Club statistics ===
As of 9 January 2025

Appearances and goals by club, season and competition
Club	Season	League			National Cup		Continental		Other		Total	
Club	Season	Division	Apps	Goals	Apps	Goals	Apps	Goals	Apps	Goals	Apps	Goals
Shanghai Shenhua	2018	Chinese Super League	15	1	0	0	0	0	0 (Note: Appearances in Chinese FA Super Cup)	0	15	1
Shanghai Shenhua	2019	Chinese Super League	26	1	5	0	-		-		30	1
Shanghai Shenhua	2020	Chinese Super League	14	0	1	0	0	0	-		15	0
Shanghai Shenhua	2021	Chinese Super League	13	0	0	0	-		-		13	0
Shanghai Shenhua	2022	Chinese Super League	14	2	1	0	-		-		15	2
Shanghai Shenhua	2023	Chinese Super League	24	1	5	0	-		-		29	1
Shanghai Shenhua	2024	Chinese Super League	24	2	1	0	4	0	1	0	30	2
Shanghai Shenhua	Total		130	7	13	0	4	0	1	0	148	7
Career total			130	7	13	0	4	0	1	0	148	7

=== International statistics ===
National team
Year	Apps	Goals
2019	6	0
2020	0	0
2021	4	0
2022	7	1
2023	6	0
2024	11	0
2025	4	0
2026	4	0
Total	42	1

=== International goals ===
No.	Date	Venue	Opponent	Score	Result	Competition
1	24 March 2022	Sharjah Stadium, Sharjah, United Arab Emirates	Saudi Arabia	1–1	1–1	2022 FIFA World Cup qualification

== Honours ==
Shanghai Shenhua

- Chinese FA Cup: 2019, 2023
- Chinese FA Super Cup: 2024, 2025

Individual

- Chinese Football Association Young Player of the Year: 2019
- Chinese Super League Team of the Year: 2019, 2023, 2024
