= Bai Jiajun =

Chinese footballer

Bai Jiajun 柏佳骏
Personal information
- Date of birth: 20 March 1991 (age 35)
- Place of birth: Shanghai, China
- Height: 1.66 m (5 ft 5 1/2 in)
- Position: Left-back

Team information
- Current team: Ningbo FC
- Number: 23

Youth career
- 2000–2006: Genbao Football Academy

Senior career*
Years	Team	Apps	(Gls)
2007–2012	Shanghai East Asia	90	(1)
2012	→ Shanghai Shenhua (loan)	12	(1)
2013–2023	Shanghai Shenhua	185	(2)
2023	Jinan Xingzhou	13	(0)
2024	Guangxi Pingguo Haliao	13	(1)
2025–	Ningbo FC	16	(0)

International career^{‡}
2005–2006	China U-17		
2010	China U-20		
2012	China U-22	5	(0)
2017	China	1	(0)
- * Club domestic league appearances and goals as of 31 January 2023 ‡ National team caps and goals as of 10 January 2017

Bai Jiajun
- Simplified Chinese: 柏佳骏
- Traditional Chinese: 柏佳駿
Transcriptions
Standard Mandarin
- Hanyu Pinyin: Bǎi Jiājùn
- IPA: [pàɪ tɕjá tɕŷn]

Bai Jiajun (Chinese: 柏佳骏; pinyin: Bǎi Jiājùn; born 20 March 1991) is a Chinese football player who currently plays for Chinese League One side Ningbo FC as a left-back.

== Club career ==
Born in Shanghai, Bai joined Genbao Football Academy in 2000 and was described by Academy's general manager Xu Genbao as being a hot prospect for the future. Bai was promoted to Shanghai East Asia squad in 2007 for the China League Two campaign. He made an impression within the team as Shanghai East Asia won promotion to the second tier at the end of the season. On 31 October 2008, he scored his first senior goal in a 4–1 away defeat against Jiangsu Sainty.

On 4 July 2012, Bai moved to Chinese Super League side Shanghai Shenhua on a 4-month loan deal. He made his Super League debut on 14 July, in a 3–1 home victory against Beijing Guoan. After that he would quickly establish himself within the team and became a regular starter at left-back. His first Super League goal came on 15 September which ensured Shanghai Shenhua beat Liaoning Whowin 3–0 at Hongkou Football Stadium. Bai transferred to Shanghai Shenhua permanently in February 2013. He extended his contract with the club for five years on 19 November 2017. On 7 March 2019, Bai was suspended for five matches, after an elbow to the head of Shanghai SIPG F.C. player Oscar in the Shanghai Derby. He was able to return for the final of the 2017 Chinese FA Cup against Shanghai SIPG that Shenhua went on to win.

== International career ==
Bai was first called up into China U-17's squad in 2005. He was excluded from the squad for the 2006 AFC U-17 Championship in September 2006. In January 2010, Bai received his called up for China U-20 by Su Maozhen. He played as a regular starter for U-20s in the 2010 AFC U-19 Championship, however, China lost to North Korea U-20 in the Quarter-finals and couldn't qualify for 2011 FIFA U-20 World Cup. Bai moved up to China U-22 in April 2012, and was included in the squad for 2013 AFC U-22 Asian Cup qualification held by Laos in June 2012. He made his debut for U-22s in the opening match which China beat Laos 2–0. He made 3 appearances in the qualification as China U-22 finally qualified into the 2013 AFC U-22 Championship.

On 10 January 2017, Bai made his debut for Chinese national team in the 2017 China Cup against Iceland, coming on as a substitution for Deng Hanwen in the 65th minute.

== Career statistics ==
Statistics accurate as of match played 31 January 2023.

Appearances and goals by club, season and competition
Club	Season	League			National Cup		Continental		Other		Total	
Club	Season	Division	Apps	Goals	Apps	Goals	Apps	Goals	Apps	Goals	Apps	Goals
Shanghai East Asia	2007	China League Two		0	-		-		-			0
Shanghai East Asia	2008	China League One	20	1	-		-		-		20	1
Shanghai East Asia	2009	China League One	21	0	-		-		-		21	0
Shanghai East Asia	2010	China League One	14	0	-		-		-		14	0
Shanghai East Asia	2011	China League One	23	0	2	0	-		-		25	0
Shanghai East Asia	2012	China League One	12	0	0	0	-		-		12	0
Shanghai East Asia	Total		90	1	2	0	0	0	0	0	92	1
Shanghai Shenhua (loan)	2012	Chinese Super League	12	1	1	0	-		-		13	1
Shanghai Shenhua	2013	Chinese Super League	23	0	0	0	-		-		23	0
Shanghai Shenhua	2014	Chinese Super League	21	0	4	0	-		-		25	0
Shanghai Shenhua	2015	Chinese Super League	26	1	7	0	-		-		33	1
Shanghai Shenhua	2016	Chinese Super League	26	0	3	0	-		-		29	0
Shanghai Shenhua	2017	Chinese Super League	15	1	3	0	1	0	-		19	1
Shanghai Shenhua	2018	Chinese Super League	25	0	0	0	3	0	0 (Note: Appearances in Chinese FA Super Cup)	0	28	0
Shanghai Shenhua	2019	Chinese Super League	15	0	2	0	-		-		17	0
Shanghai Shenhua	2020	Chinese Super League	6	0	0	0	1	0	-		7	0
Shanghai Shenhua	2021	Chinese Super League	4	0	1	0	-		-		5	0
Shanghai Shenhua	2022	Chinese Super League	24	0	1	0	-		-		25	0
Shanghai Shenhua	Total		185	2	21	0	5	0	0	0	211	2
Career total			287	4	24	0	5	0	0	0	316	4

== Honours ==
Shanghai Shenhua

- Chinese FA Cup: 2017, 2019
