= Li Peng (footballer) =

Chinese footballer

Li Peng 栗鹏
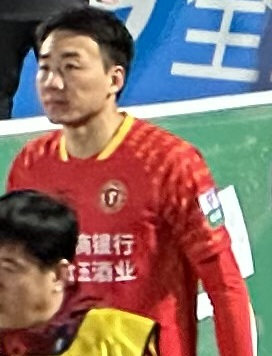
- Li Peng in April 2025

Personal information
- Full name: Li Peng
- Date of birth: 29 August 1990 (age 36)
- Place of birth: Handan, Hebei, China
- Height: 1.85 m (6 ft 1 in)
- Position: Defender

Team information
- Current team: Liaoning Tieren
- Number: 5

Youth career
- 2003–2009: Shandong Luneng Taishan

Senior career*
Years	Team	Apps	(Gls)
2008	Xinjiang Sport Lottery (loan)	?	(?)
2010–2016	Qingdao Jonoon	136	(6)
2017–2022	Shanghai Shenhua	54	(2)
2020	→ Nantong Zhiyun (loan)	15	(0)
2021	→ Qingdao FC (loan)	17	(0)
2022	Wuhan Yangtze River	31	(3)
2023	Cangzhou Mighty Lions	5	(0)
2024	Yunnan Yukun	8	(0)
2025–	Liaoning Tieren	19	(1)
- * Club domestic league appearances and goals as of 2 August 2025

Li Peng (Chinese: 栗鹏; pinyin: Lì Péng; born 29 August 1990) is a Chinese professional footballer who currently plays for China League One club Liaoning Tieren.

== Club career ==
Li joined Shandong Luneng Taishan Football School in 2003. He was loaned to Xinjiang Sport Lottery in 2008 for the 2008 China League Two campaign. He transferred to Chinese Super League side Qingdao Jonoon in March 2010. On 22 August 2010, he made his debut for Qingdao Jonoon in a Super League match which Qingdao lost to Jiangsu Sainty 4–0, coming on as a substitute for Lee Yoon-Sub in the 25th minute. On 12 September 2010, he scored his first Super League goal in his second appearance, which ensured Qingdao beat Shenzhen Ruby 4–3.

On 1 December 2016, Li moved to Super League side Shanghai Shenhua. He made his debut for Shanghai on 11 March 2017 in a 1–1 home draw against Tianjin Quanjian, coming on for Li Jianbin in the 57th minute.

== Career statistics ==
Statistics accurate as of match played 2 August 2025.

Club	Season	League			National Cup		Continental		Other		Total	
Club	Season	Division	Apps	Goals	Apps	Goals	Apps	Goals	Apps	Goals	Apps	Goals
Xinjiang Sport Lottery	2008	China League Two	?	?	-		-		-		?	?
Qingdao Jonoon	2010	Chinese Super League	10	2	-		-		-		10	2
Qingdao Jonoon	2011	Chinese Super League	28	2	0	0	-		-		28	2
Qingdao Jonoon	2012	Chinese Super League	24	0	0	0	-		-		24	0
Qingdao Jonoon	2013	Chinese Super League	18	0	1	0	-		-		19	0
Qingdao Jonoon	2014	China League One	24	2	3	0	-		-		27	2
Qingdao Jonoon	2015	China League One	22	0	2	0	-		-		24	0
Qingdao Jonoon	2016	China League One	10	0	0	0	-		-		10	0
Qingdao Jonoon	Total		136	6	6	0	0	0	0	0	142	6
Shanghai Shenhua	2017	Chinese Super League	9	0	3	0	0	0	-		12	0
Shanghai Shenhua	2018	Chinese Super League	25	2	1	0	4	0	-		30	2
Shanghai Shenhua	2019	Chinese Super League	20	0	3	0	-		-		23	0
Shanghai Shenhua	Total		54	2	7	0	4	0	0	0	65	2
Nantong Zhiyun (loan)	2020	China League One	15	0	-		-		-		15	0
Qingdao (loan)	2021	Chinese Super League	17	0	2	0	-		2	0	21	0
Wuhan Yangtze River	2022	Chinese Super League	31	3	0	0	-		-		31	3
Cangzhou Mighty Lions	2023	Chinese Super League	5	0	1	0	-		-		6	0
Yunnan Yukun	2024	China League One	8	0	1	0	-		-		9	0
Liaoning Tieren	2025	China League One	19	1	2	0	-		-		21	1
Career total			275	12	19	0	4	0	2	0	300	12

== Honours ==
=== Club ===
Shanghai Shenhua

- Chinese FA Cup: 2017, 2019

Liaoning Tieren

- China League One: 2025
