= Xu Yougang =

Chinese footballer

Xu Yougang 徐友刚
Personal information
- Full name: Xu Yougang
- Date of birth: 9 February 1996 (age 30)
- Place of birth: Chaohu, Anhui, China
- Height: 1.80 m (5 ft 11 in)
- Position: Defender

Team information
- Current team: Ningbo FC
- Number: 35

Youth career
- Hangzhou Greentown
- Shanghai Luckystar
- 2014–2015: Shanghai Shenhua

Senior career*
Years	Team	Apps	(Gls)
2015	→ CF Crack's (loan)	12	(1)
2015–2024	Shanghai Shenhua	27	(1)
2016–2017	→ Qingdao Huanghai (loan)	34	(0)
2019	→ Liaoning FC (loan)	9	(0)
2020	→ Zhejiang Yiteng (loan)	6	(0)
2021	→ Zibo Cuju (loan)	28	(1)
2024	→ Guangxi Pingguo Haliao (loan)	8	(1)
2025	Jiangxi Lushan	29	(2)
2026	Shijiazhuang Gongfu	11	(0)
2026–	Ningbo FC	0	(0)

International career^{‡}
2017–2018	China U23	4	(0)
- * Club domestic league appearances and goals as of 31 January 2023 ‡ National team caps and goals as of 19 August 2018

Xu Yougang (Chinese: 徐友刚; born 9 February 1996) is a Chinese footballer who plays as a defender for Ningbo FC.

== Club career ==
Xu Yougang started his football career in January 2015 when he was loaned to Shanghai Shenhua's satellite team CF Crack's in the Primera Regional de la Comunidad Valenciana. He returned to Shanghai Shenhua in July 2015. On 25 October 2015, he made his debut for Shenhua in the 2015 Chinese Super League against Liaoning Whowin, coming on as a substitute for Zhang Lu in the 69th minute. On 25 February 2016, Xu was loaned to China League One side Qingdao Huanghai for one season. Qingdao Huanghai extended his loan deal for another season in 2017.

In December 2017, Xu returned to Shanghai Shenhua for the 2018 season. On 13 April 2018, he scored his first goal for the club in a 2–2 home draw with Guangzhou Evergrande Taobao. Despite this goal, Xu would struggle to gain significant playing time and was loaned out once again, this time to second tier club Liaoning FC on 31 July 2019. The following season he was loaned out to third tier club Zhejiang Yiteng on 02 September 2020. Another loan to second tier club Zibo Cuju would happen on 12 April 2021.

On 31 December 2024, Xu was released by Shanghai Shenhua.

On 13 February 2026, Xu joined China League One club Shijiazhuang Gongfu.

On 21 July 2026, Xu transferred to China League One side Ningbo FC after 6 months in Shijiazhuang.

== Career statistics ==
Statistics accurate as of match played 31 January 2023.

Appearances and goals by club, season and competition
Club	Season	League			National Cup		Continental		Other		Total	
Club	Season	Division	Apps	Goals	Apps	Goals	Apps	Goals	Apps	Goals	Apps	Goals
CF Crack's (loan)	2014−15	Primera Regional (Valencia)	12	1	-		-		-		12	1
Shanghai Shenhua	2015	Chinese Super League	1	0	0	0	-		-		1	0
Shanghai Shenhua	2018	Chinese Super League	11	1	0	0	1	0	-		12	1
Shanghai Shenhua	2019	Chinese Super League	5	0	2	0	-		-		7	0
Shanghai Shenhua	2022	Chinese Super League	10	0	4	2	-		-		14	2
Shanghai Shenhua	Total		27	1	6	2	1	0	0	0	34	3
Qingdao Huanghai (loan)	2016	China League One	9	0	1	0	-		-		10	0
Qingdao Huanghai (loan)	2017	China League One	25	0	0	0	-		-		25	0
Qingdao Huanghai (loan)	Total		34	0	1	0	0	0	0	0	35	0
Liaoning FC (loan)	2019	China League One	9	0	0	0	-		2 (Note: Appearance(s) in Promotion/Relegation Play-offs)	0	11	0
Zhejiang Yiteng (loan)	2020	China League Two	6	0	-		-		-		6	0
Zibo Cuju (loan)	2021	China League One	28	1	-		-		-		28	1
Career total			116	3	7	2	1	0	2	0	126	5

== Honours ==
Shanghai Shenhua

- Chinese FA Cup: 2023
