= Wang Wei (footballer) =

Chinese footballer

Wang Wei 王伟
Personal information
- Full name: Wang Wei
- Date of birth: 22 June 1989 (age 37)
- Place of birth: Wafangdian, Liaoning, China
- Height: 1.83 m (6 ft 0 in)
- Positions: Midfielder; full back

Youth career
- 2004–2008: Beijing Baxy

Senior career*
Years	Team	Apps	(Gls)
2009–2013	Beijing Baxy	61	(7)
2014–2016	Qingdao Jonoon	85	(13)
2017–2020	Shanghai Shenhua	18	(1)
2020	→ Qingdao Huanghai (Loan)	13	(0)
2021	Qingdao FC	17	(0)
2022–2023	Meizhou Hakka	30	(0)
- * Club domestic league appearances and goals as of 31 December 2022

Wang Wei (Chinese: 王伟; pinyin: Wáng Wěi; born 22 June 1989) is a Chinese former professional footballer who played as a versatile midfielder or full back.

== Club career ==
Wang Wei started his professional football career in 2009 when he was promoted to China League Two side Beijing Baxy's first team squad. He transferred to China League One side Qingdao Jonoon in February 2014 after a successful trial. On 16 March 2014, he made his debut in a 1–1 home draw with Xinjiang Tianshan Leopard. He scored his first goal for the club on 29 March 2014 in a 1–1 home draw against Shenyang Zhongze. Wang was a regular starter of the club, playing 85 league matches of 90 from 2014 to 2016 and scoring 13 goals.

On 28 February 2017, Wang transferred to Chinese Super League side Shanghai Greenland Shenhua following Qingdao Jonoon's relegation. He made his debut on 3 April 2018 in the fifth group stage match of 2018 AFC Champions League against Kashima Antlers with a 2–2 home draw. He made his Super League debut five days later on 8 April, in a 2–0 away win over Beijing Renhe. He scored his first goal for the club on 20 May 2018 in a 2–1 away defeat to Tianjin Quanjian. On 28 February 2020 he joined newly promoted Qingdao Huanghai on loan for the start of the 2020 Chinese Super League.

On 22 March 2022, Wang transferred to Chinese Super League club Meizhou Hakka. He would go on to make his debut in a league game on 4 June 2022 against Tianjin Jinmen Tiger in a 1–1 draw.

== Career statistics ==
As of 31 December 2022.

Appearances and goals by club, season and competition
Club	Season	League			National Cup		Continental		Other		Total	
Club	Season	Division	Apps	Goals	Apps	Goals	Apps	Goals	Apps	Goals	Apps	Goals
Beijing Baxy	2009	China League Two			-		-		-			
Beijing Baxy	2010	China League One	0	0	-		-		-		0	0
Beijing Baxy	2011	China League One	18	2	0	0	-		-		18	2
Beijing Baxy	2012	China League One	18	1	1	0	-		-		19	1
Beijing Baxy	2013	China League One	25	4	0	0	-		-		25	4
Beijing Baxy	Total		61	7	1	0	0	0	0	0	68	7
Qingdao Jonoon	2014	China League One	28	8	3	2	-		-		31	10
Qingdao Jonoon	2015	China League One	28	2	1	0	-		-		29	2
Qingdao Jonoon	2016	China League One	29	3	1	0	-		-		30	3
Qingdao Jonoon	Total		85	13	5	2	0	0	0	0	90	15
Shanghai Shenhua	2017	Chinese Super League	0	0	0	0	0	0	-		0	0
Shanghai Shenhua	2018	Chinese Super League	5	1	1	0	2	0	-		8	1
Shanghai Shenhua	2019	Chinese Super League	13	0	2	0	-		-		15	0
Shanghai Shenhua	2020	Chinese Super League	1	0	0	0	6	0	-		7	0
Shanghai Shenhua	Total		19	1	3	0	8	0	0	0	30	1
Qingdao Huanghai (loan)	2020	Chinese Super League	13	0	0	0	-		-		13	0
Qingdao	2021	Chinese Super League	17	0	2	0	-		-		19	0
Meizhou Hakka	2022	Chinese Super League	23	0	1	0	-		-		24	0
Career total			218	21	12	2	8	0	0	0	238	23

== Honours ==
=== Club ===
Shanghai Shenhua

- Chinese FA Cup: 2019
