= Genbao Football Base =

Football venue in Shanghai, China

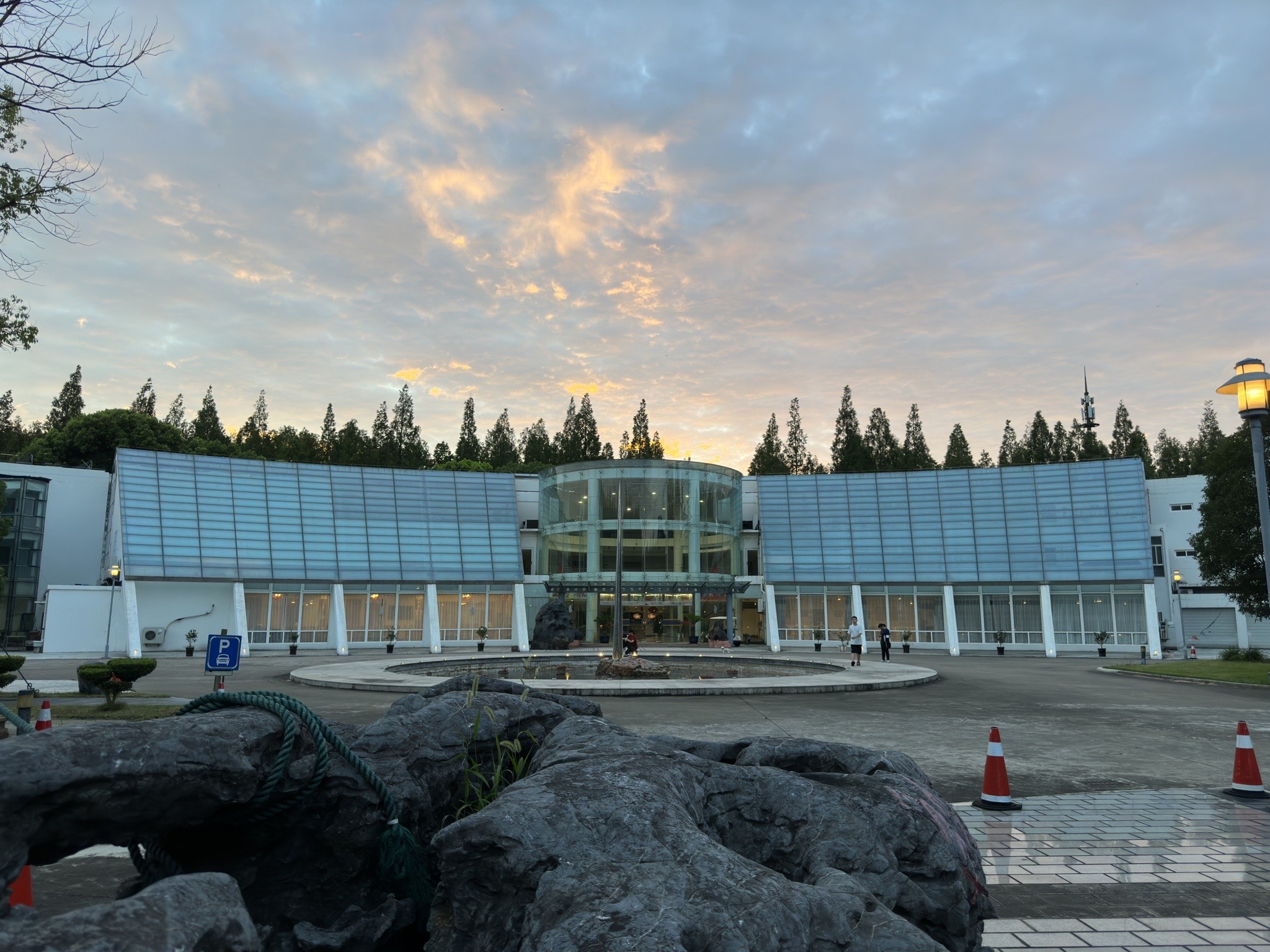
- Interactive map of Genbao Football Base
- Location: Chongming County; Shanghai, China
- Coordinates: 31°40′18″N 121°29′6″E
- Owner: Xu Genbao
- Type: Sports facility

Construction
- Built: 2000
- Opened: 2001
- Cost: 80 million yuan

Genbao Football Base (Chinese: 上海根宝足球基地) is the training ground of Shanghai Port F.C. and home to the base's own youth academy. Located in Chongming District, Shanghai, China, the base is named after its founder and owner, Xu Genbao, a prominent Chinese football manager and a former international footballer.

The construction of the base started in 2000, after Xu Genbao quit his managerial position at Dalian Shide in 1999 and determined to devote himself to youth football. In 2000, the base, while still under construction, saw the first batch of young players aged between 11 and 12 enrolled into the academy. Some of them formed Shanghai East Asia F.C. (now Shanghai Port), which was founded by Xu Genbao in 2005, and went on to win the 2007 China League Two and the 2012 China League One. The club is currently playing in the Chinese Super League, the top division in China. The base has produced several Chinese international football players including Jiang Zhipeng, Zhang Linpeng, Yan Junling, Bai Jiajun, Wang Shenchao, Cao Yunding, Jiang Shenglong, Zhu Chenjie, Fu Huan, Chen Binbin, Cai Huikang, Xu Haoyang and Wu Lei.

Inside the base, there are three and a half standard sized football pitches, as well as an indoor football arena covered with artificial turf. It also includes a dining, banquet and dancing hall, numerous activity rooms, and sixty-four guest rooms and two luxury suites at a three-star standard. The facilities can be rented out for conventions and functions.

The site covers a total area of 4.7 hectares and is adjacent to Dongping National Forest Park.
