= Sun Shilin =

Chinese footballer

Sun Shilin 孙世林
Personal information
- Date of birth: 24 October 1988 (age 38)
- Place of birth: Dalian, Liaoning, China
- Height: 1.75 m (5 ft 9 in)
- Position: Midfielder

Youth career
- Harbin Yiteng

Senior career*
Years	Team	Apps	(Gls)
2006–2010	Harbin Yiteng	35	(1)
2011	Fushun Xinye	12	(1)
2012–2016	Liaoning Whowin	73	(2)
2012	→ Fujian Smart Hero (loan)	28	(0)
2017–2022	Shanghai Shenhua	105	(1)
Total		253	(5)
- * Club domestic league appearances and goals as of 31 January 2023

Sun Shilin (Chinese: 孙世林; born 24 October 1988 in Dalian) is a Chinese former football player.

On 10 September 2024, Chinese Football Association announced that Sun was banned from football-related activities for lifetime for involving in match-fixing.

== Club career ==
In 2006, Sun Shilin started his professional footballer career with Harbin Yiteng in the China League Two. In February 2011, Sun transferred to China League Two side Fushun Xinye.

In January 2012, Sun transferred to Chinese Super League side Liaoning Whowin. In February 2012，he moved to China League One side Fujian Smart Hero on a one-year loan deal. He made his league debut for Liaoning on 18 May 2013 in a game against Guangzhou Evergrande, coming on as a substitute for Pablo Brandán in the 79th minute. On 20 March 2015, he received a ban of three months by Chinese Football Association for age falsification which he changed his age from 24 October 1988 to 24 October 1989.

On 1 December 2016, Sun moved to fellow Super League side Shanghai Shenhua. On 8 February 2017, he made his debut in the 2017 AFC Champions League qualifying play-off against Brisbane Roar in a 2-0 defeat. He made his league debut for Shanghai on 5 March 2017 in a 4–0 home victory against Jiangsu Suning, coming on as a substitute for Cao Yunding in the 72nd minute. On 11 March 2017, Sun put his hand on Alexandre Pato's shoulder and gave him a thumbs-up sign after Pato lost a penalty in a league match against Tianjin Quanjian. He was charged for his unsporting conduct and received a ban of two matches on 24 March 2017.

== Career statistics ==
Statistics accurate as of match played 31 January 2023.

Appearances and goals by club, season and competition
Club	Season	League			National Cup		Continental		Other		Total	
Club	Season	Division	Apps	Goals	Apps	Goals	Apps	Goals	Apps	Goals	Apps	Goals
Harbin Yiteng	2006	China League Two			-		-		-			
Harbin Yiteng	2007	China League One	16	0	-		-		-		16	0
Harbin Yiteng	2008	China League One	19	1	-		-		-		19	1
Harbin Yiteng	2009	China League Two		0	-		-		-			0
Harbin Yiteng	2010	China League Two			-		-		-			
Harbin Yiteng	Total		35	1	0	0	0	0	0	0	35	1
Fushun Xinye	2011	China League Two	12	1	-		-		-		12	1
Fujian Smart Hero (loan)	2012	China League One	28	0	0	0	-		-		28	0
Liaoning Whowin	2013	Chinese Super League	15	0	2	0	-		-		17	0
Liaoning Whowin	2014	Chinese Super League	20	0	0	0	-		-		20	0
Liaoning Whowin	2015	Chinese Super League	14	1	0	0	-		-		14	1
Liaoning Whowin	2016	Chinese Super League	24	1	0	0	-		-		24	1
Liaoning Whowin	Total		73	2	2	0	0	0	0	0	75	2
Shanghai Shenhua	2017	Chinese Super League	24	0	8	0	1	0	-		33	0
Shanghai Shenhua	2018	Chinese Super League	20	0	1	0	3	0	0 (Note: Appearances in Chinese FA Super Cup)	0	24	0
Shanghai Shenhua	2019	Chinese Super League	16	0	4	0	-		-		20	0
Shanghai Shenhua	2020	Chinese Super League	14	1	0	0	5	0	-		19	1
Shanghai Shenhua	2021	Chinese Super League	13	0	4	1	-		-		17	1
Shanghai Shenhua	2022	Chinese Super League	18	0	4	0	-		-		22	0
Shanghai Shenhua	Total		105	1	21	1	9	0	0	0	135	2
Career total			253	5	23	1	9	0	0	0	285	6

== Honours ==
=== Club ===
Shanghai Shenhua

- Chinese FA Cup: 2017, 2019
