= Cao Yunding =

Chinese footballer

Cao Yunding 曹赟定
Personal information
- Full name: Cao Yunding
- Date of birth: 22 November 1989 (age 36)
- Place of birth: Shanghai, China
- Height: 1.73 m (5 ft 8 in)
- Position: Left winger

Youth career
- 2000–2005: Genbao Football Academy

Senior career*
| Years | Team | Apps | (Gls) |
| 2006–2010 | Shanghai East Asia | 60 | (7) |
| 2011–2024 | Shanghai Shenhua | 302 | (33) |

International career^{‡}
| 2007–2008 | China U-20 | | |
| 2009–2010 | China U-23 | | |
| 2016–2019 | China | 5 | (0) |
Medal record
Representing China
Men's football
EAFF Championship
| Bronze medal – third place | 2019 South Korea | Team |
- * Club domestic league appearances and goals as of 31 January 2023 ‡ National team caps and goals as of 31 December 2019

Cao Yunding
- Chinese: 曹赟定
Transcriptions
Standard Mandarin
- Hanyu Pinyin: Cáo Yūndìng
- IPA: [tsʰǎʊ ýn tîŋ]

Cao Yunding (Chinese: 曹赟定; pinyin: Cáo Yūndìng; born 22 November 1989) is a Chinese former footballer who played as a right-footed left winger.

== Club career ==
Cao Yunding started his football career when he joined the Genbao Football Academy in 2000 and was promoted to Shanghai East Asia's first team during the 2006 season. He scored his first goal for the club on 20 August 2006 in a 4-1 win against Wuhan Yaqi. Cao established himself as a regular in the team as the club won third tier title and promotion to the second tier during the 2007 season. In the 2009 season, the club became genuine promotion candidates and Cao played twenty-two games and scored two goals as Shanghai East Asia finished fourth and narrowly missed out on promotion. Cao made another twenty appearances and scored two goals during the 2010 season as he helped guide the club to another fourth-place finish.

On 12 February 2011, Cao transferred to Chinese Super League side Shanghai Shenhua. He made his debut for the club on 2 March 2011 in a 0-0 draw against Kashima Antlers in the 2011 AFC Champions League. He scored his first goal for the club on 21 September 2011 in a 1-0 win against Yanbian Baekdu Tigers in the 2011 Chinese FA Cup. He then scored his first league goal for the club on 24 September 2011 in a 3-2 loss against Jiangsu Sainty. He extended his contract with the club for five more years on 19 November 2017.

On 31 December 2024, Cao announced his retirement from professional football through the social media.

== International career ==
Cao made his debut for the Chinese national team on 15 November 2016 in a 0-0 draw against Qatar.

== Career statistics ==
=== Club statistics ===
As of 31 January 2023.

Appearances and goals by club, season and competition
| Club | Season | League | | | National Cup | | Continental | | Other | | Total | |
| Club | Season | Division | Apps | Goals | Apps | Goals | Apps | Goals | Apps | Goals | Apps | Goals |
|---|---|---|---|---|---|---|---|---|---|---|---|---|
| Shanghai SIPG | 2006 | China League Two | | | - | | - | | - | | | |
| Shanghai SIPG | 2007 | China League Two | | | - | | - | | - | | | |
| Shanghai SIPG | 2008 | China League One | 16 | 3 | - | | - | | - | | 16 | 3 |
| Shanghai SIPG | 2009 | China League One | 22 | 2 | - | | - | | - | | 22 | 2 |
| Shanghai SIPG | 2010 | China League One | 22 | 2 | - | | - | | - | | 22 | 2 |
| Shanghai SIPG | Total | | 60 | 7 | 0 | 0 | 0 | 0 | 0 | 0 | 60 | 7 |
| Shanghai Shenhua | 2011 | Chinese Super League | 27 | 1 | 0 | 0 | 5 | 0 | - | | 32 | 1 |
| Shanghai Shenhua | 2012 | Chinese Super League | 25 | 5 | 2 | 0 | - | | - | | 27 | 5 |
| Shanghai Shenhua | 2013 | Chinese Super League | 23 | 0 | 1 | 1 | - | | - | | 24 | 1 |
| Shanghai Shenhua | 2014 | Chinese Super League | 28 | 1 | 5 | 0 | - | | - | | 33 | 1 |
| Shanghai Shenhua | 2015 | Chinese Super League | 20 | 2 | 5 | 1 | - | | - | | 25 | 3 |
| Shanghai Shenhua | 2016 | Chinese Super League | 29 | 4 | 5 | 1 | - | | - | | 34 | 5 |
| Shanghai Shenhua | 2017 | Chinese Super League | 26 | 5 | 5 | 1 | 1 | 0 | - | | 32 | 6 |
| Shanghai Shenhua | 2018 | Chinese Super League | 19 | 3 | 0 | 0 | 2 | 0 | 0 (Note: Appearances in Chinese FA Super Cup) | 0 | 21 | 3 |
| Shanghai Shenhua | 2019 | Chinese Super League | 25 | 2 | 6 | 1 | - | | - | | 31 | 3 |
| Shanghai Shenhua | 2020 | Chinese Super League | 17 | 1 | 1 | 0 | 1 | 0 | - | | 19 | 1 |
| Shanghai Shenhua | 2021 | Chinese Super League | 15 | 3 | 3 | 0 | - | | - | | 18 | 3 |
| Shanghai Shenhua | 2022 | Chinese Super League | 19 | 3 | 0 | 0 | - | | - | | 19 | 3 |
| Shanghai Shenhua | Total | | 273 | 30 | 33 | 5 | 9 | 0 | 0 | 0 | 315 | 35 |
| Career total | | | 333 | 37 | 33 | 5 | 9 | 0 | 0 | 0 | 375 | 42 |

=== International statistics ===
National team
| Year | Apps | Goals |
|---|---|---|
| 2016 | 1 | 0 |
| 2017 | 1 | 0 |
| 2018 | 0 | 0 |
| 2019 | 3 | 0 |
| Total | 5 | 0 |

== Honours ==
Shanghai East Asia

- China League Two: 2007

Shanghai Shenhua

- Chinese FA Cup: 2017, 2019, 2023
- Chinese FA Super Cup: 2024

Individual

- Chinese FA Cup Most Valuable Player: 2017
