= 2017 Shanghai Greenland Shenhua F.C. season =

Shanghai Shenhua
- Chairman: Wu Xiaohui
- Manager: Gus Poyet (until 11 September); Wu Jingui (caretaker) (from 11 September)
- Stadium: Hongkou Football Stadium
- Super League: 11th
- FA Cup: Winners
- Top goalscorer: League: Giovanni Moreno (15 goals); All: Giovanni Moreno (15 goals)
- Highest home attendance: 24,319 vs Shanghai SIPG; 19 November 2017
- Lowest home attendance: 15,269 vs Chongqing Dangdai Lifan; 17 June 2017
Home colours	Away colours

The 2017 Shanghai Greenland Shenhua season was Shanghai Greenland Shenhua's 14th season in the Chinese Super League and 55th overall in the Chinese top flight. They also competed in the Chinese FA Cup and AFC Champions League.

== Season events ==
On 29 November 2016, Gus Poyet was appointed as the club's new manager, replacing Gregorio Manzano.

On 30 June 2017, it was announced that Fredy Guarín had signed a new two-year contract with the club until end of 2019.

On 11 September 2017, after a home defeat to Henan Jianye, Poyet resigned as manager of the club. Technical director and former head coach Wu Jingui was placed in charge for Shenhua's remaining games.

On 19 November 2017, before the first leg of 2017 Chinese FA Cup final began, it was announced that Cao Yunding, Bai Jiajun, Li Yunqiu and Bi Jinhao all had signed new five-year contracts with the club until 2022.

On 26 November 2017, Shenhua beat Shanghai SIPG to win the 2017 Chinese FA Cup on the away goals rule after second leg of the final ended 3–2 to make it 3–3 on aggregate. It was Shenhua's first FA Cup triumph since 1998 and earned them a place in next season's AFC Champions League.

== Squad ==
As of 14 July 2017

Note: Flags indicate national team as defined under FIFA eligibility rules; some limited exceptions apply. Players may hold more than one non-FIFA nationality.

No.	Pos.	Nation	Player
2	DF	CHN	Xiong Fei
3	DF	CHN	Li Jianbin
4	DF	KOR	Kim Kee-hee
5	MF	CHN	Wang Shouting
6	DF	CHN	Li Peng
7	FW	CHN	Mao Jianqing
8	MF	CHN	Zhang Lu
10	MF	COL	Giovanni Moreno (Captain)
11	FW	CHN	Lü Zheng
12	GK	CHN	Chen Zhao
13	MF	COL	Fredy Guarín
15	FW	CHN	Zhu Jianrong
16	DF	CHN	Li Yunqiu
17	FW	NGR	Obafemi Martins
21	GK	CHN	Shen Jun
22	GK	CHN	Qiu Shengjiong

No.	Pos.	Nation	Player
23	DF	CHN	Bai Jiajun
25	DF	CHN	Wang Lin
26	MF	CHN	Qin Sheng
27	GK	CHN	Li Shuai
28	MF	CHN	Cao Yunding
29	MF	CHN	Xu Junmin
30	DF	CHN	Tao Jin
31	MF	CHN	Wang Wei
32	FW	ARG	Carlos Tevez
33	MF	CHN	Liu Jiawei
34	DF	CHN	Bi Jinhao
35	MF	CHN	Lü Pin
36	MF	CHN	Liu Ruofan
37	MF	CHN	Sun Shilin
38	MF	CHN	Chen Tao
39	MF	CHN	Cong Zhen

Source：

=== Reserve squad ===
Note: Flags indicate national team as defined under FIFA eligibility rules; some limited exceptions apply. Players may hold more than one non-FIFA nationality.

No.	Pos.	Nation	Player
41	DF	CHN	Cheng Rui
43	DF	CHN	Huang Linhao
44	MF	CHN	Tan Yang
45	FW	CHN	Yan Ge
46	MF	CHN	Pan Weihao
47	FW	CHN	Xie Jinzheng
48	DF	CHN	Liao Zhilüe
49	MF	CHN	Chen Qiyuan
50	GK	CHN	Yu Qixuan
51	DF	HKG	Brian Fok

No.	Pos.	Nation	Player
52	MF	CHN	Zhang Yuhao
53	DF	CHN	Cui Qi
54	DF	CHN	Zhang Jiangyi
55	GK	CHN	Jiang Yutao
56	MF	CHN	Chen Xiaomao
57	DF	CHN	Sun Kai
58	DF	CHN	Geng Jiaqi
59	GK	CHN	Li Yangxin
60	MF	CHN	Hu Jiali
—	FW	CHN	Sun Xipeng

=== On loan ===
Note: Flags indicate national team as defined under FIFA eligibility rules; some limited exceptions apply. Players may hold more than one non-FIFA nationality.

No.	Pos.	Nation	Player
20	MF	CHN	Wang Yun (at Shanghai Shenxin until 31 December 2017)
—	DF	CHN	Zheng Kaimu (at Shijiazhuang Ever Bright until 31 December 2017)
—	DF	CHN	Xu Yougang (at Qingdao Huanghai until 31 December 2017)
—	DF	CHN	Leng Shiao (at Guizhou Hengfeng Zhicheng until 31 December 2017)
—	DF	CHN	Li Xiaoming (at Shenzhen until 31 December 2017)
—	DF	CHN	Gong Jinshuai (at Shanghai Sunfun until 31 December 2017)
—	DF	CHN	Cao Chuanyu (at Shanghai JuJu Sports until 31 December 2017)
—	DF	CHN	Deng Biao (at Shanghai JuJu Sports until 31 December 2017)
—	MF	CHN	Xu Jun (at Shanghai JuJu Sports until 31 December 2017)
—	MF	CHN	Zhan Yilin (at Shanghai JuJu Sports until 31 December 2017)

No.	Pos.	Nation	Player
—	MF	CHN	Wang Fei (at Shanghai JuJu Sports until 31 December 2017)
—	MF	CHN	Yan Xinyu (at Shanghai JuJu Sports until 31 December 2017)
—	MF	CHN	Deng Zhuoxiang (at Qingdao Huanghai until 31 December 2017)
—	MF	PAR	Óscar Romero (at Deportivo Alavés until 31 December 2017)
—	FW	BRA	Paulo Henrique (at Sport Recife until 30 June 2017)
—	FW	SEN	Demba Ba (at Beşiktaş until 31 May 2017)
—	FW	CHN	Wu Changqi (at Shanghai Sunfun until 31 December 2017)
—	FW	CHN	Gao Shipeng (at Shanghai JuJu Sports until 31 December 2017)
—	FW	CHN	Zhou Jiahao (at Shanghai JuJu Sports until 31 December 2017)
—	FW	CHN	Gao Di (at Jiangsu Suning until 31 December 2017)

== Transfers ==
=== Winter ===
In: Note: Flags indicate national team as defined under FIFA eligibility rules; some limited exceptions apply. Players may hold more than one non-FIFA nationality.

No.	Pos.	Nation	Player
6	DF	CHN	Li Peng (from Qingdao Jonoon)
7	FW	CHN	Mao Jianqing (from Shijiazhuang Ever Bright)
15	FW	CHN	Zhu Jianrong (from Qingdao Jonoon)
31	MF	CHN	Wang Wei (from Qingdao Jonoon)
32	FW	ARG	Carlos Tevez (from (Argentina) Boca Juniors)
35	MF	CHN	Lü Pin (loan return from (Spain) Atlético Saguntino)
37	MF	CHN	Sun Shilin (from Liaoning Whowin)
41	DF	CHN	Cheng Rui (from Dalian Yifang)
50	GK	CHN	Yu Qixuan (from Shanghai Shenxin)
51	DF	HKG	Brian Fok (loan return from (Azerbaijan) AZAL PFK)
57	DF	CHN	Sun Kai (from Shanghai Shenxin)
-	MF	PAR	Óscar Romero (from (Argentina) Racing)
-	FW	CHN	Sun Xipeng (from Qingdao Jonoon)
-	GK	CHN	Bai Shuo (loan return from Shanghai JuJu Sports)
-	DF	CHN	Li Xiaoming (loan return from Henan Jianye)
-	DF	CHN	Xu Yougang (loan return from Qingdao Huanghai)
-	DF	CHN	Leng Shiao (loan return from Qingdao Huanghai)
-	DF	CHN	Huang Bowen (loan return from Wuhan Zall)
-	DF	CHN	Deng Biao (loan return from (Spain) Atlético Saguntino)
-	MF	CHN	Pan Weihao (loan return from Qingdao Huanghai)
-	MF	CHN	Li Lianxiang (loan return from Shanghai JuJu Sports)
-	MF	CHN	Yang Haofeng (loan return from Shanghai JuJu Sports)
-	FW	CHN	Gao Shipeng (loan return from (Spain) Eldense)
-	FW	CHN	Zhou Jiahao (loan return from (Spain) Eldense)
-	FW	CHN	Wu Changqi (loan return from (Spain) La Roda)
-	FW	BRA	Paulo Henrique (loan return from (Portugal) Estoril)

Out: Note: Flags indicate national team as defined under FIFA eligibility rules; some limited exceptions apply. Players may hold more than one non-FIFA nationality.

No.	Pos.	Nation	Player
1	GK	CHN	Geng Xiaofeng (to Hebei China Fortune)
6	DF	CHN	Li Wenbo (to Hebei Elite)
9	FW	SEN	Demba Ba (loan to (Turkey) Beşiktaş)
18	FW	CHN	Gao Di (loan to Jiangsu Suning)
19	DF	CHN	Zheng Kaimu (loan to Shijiazhuang Ever Bright)
24	MF	CHN	Deng Zhuoxiang (loan to Qingdao Huanghai)
42	DF	CHN	Luo Xi (to Meizhou Hakka)
-	GK	CHN	Bai Shuo (to Shanghai JuJu Sports)
-	DF	CHN	Huang Bowen (to Wuhan Zall)
-	DF	CHN	Xu Yougang (loan to Qingdao Huanghai)
-	DF	CHN	Leng Shiao (loan to Guizhou Hengfeng Zhicheng)
-	DF	CHN	Shan Haiyang (to Zhejiang Yiteng)
-	DF	CHN	Li Xiaoming (loan to Shenzhen)
-	DF	CHN	Gong Jinshuai (loan to Shanghai Sunfun)
-	DF	CHN	Cao Chuanyu (loan to Shanghai JuJu Sports)
-	DF	CHN	Deng Biao (loan to Shanghai JuJu Sports)
-	MF	CHN	Xu Jun (loan to Shanghai JuJu Sports)
-	MF	CHN	Zhan Yilin (loan to Shanghai JuJu Sports)
-	MF	CHN	Wang Fei (loan to Shanghai JuJu Sports)
-	MF	CHN	Yan Xinyu (loan to Shanghai JuJu Sports)
-	MF	PAR	Óscar Romero (loan to (Spain) Deportivo Alavés)
-	MF	CHN	Yang Chengyun (to Qingdao Huanghai)
-	MF	CHN	Zu Pengchao (to Shenzhen)
-	MF	CHN	Xiong Zhenfeng (to Liaoning Whowin)
-	MF	CHN	Li Lianxiang (to Shanghai JuJu Sports)
-	MF	CHN	Yang Haofeng (to Shanghai JuJu Sports)
-	FW	BRA	Paulo Henrique (loan to (Brazil) Sport Recife)
-	FW	CHN	Wu Changqi (loan to Shanghai Sunfun)
-	FW	CHN	Gao Shipeng (loan to Shanghai JuJu Sports)
-	FW	CHN	Zhou Jiahao (loan to Shanghai JuJu Sports)

=== Summer ===
In: Note: Flags indicate national team as defined under FIFA eligibility rules; some limited exceptions apply. Players may hold more than one non-FIFA nationality.

No.	Pos.	Nation	Player
9	FW	SEN	Demba Ba (loan return from (Turkey) Beşiktaş)
12	GK	CHN	Chen Zhao (from (Spain) Pozuelo Alarcón)
33	MF	CHN	Liu Jiawei (loan return from (Spain) La Roda)
58	DF	CHN	Geng Jiaqi (from Hebei China Fortune)
59	GK	CHN	Li Yangxin (free agent)
60	MF	CHN	Hu Jiali (from (Portugal) Vizela)

Out: Note: Flags indicate national team as defined under FIFA eligibility rules; some limited exceptions apply. Players may hold more than one non-FIFA nationality.

No.	Pos.	Nation	Player
20	MF	CHN	Wang Yun (loan to Shanghai Shenxin)
42	DF	CHN	Xu Wu (to Chongqing Dangdai Lifan)
-	MF	CHN	Cao Dong (to Chongqing Dangdai Lifan)
-	FW	BRA	Paulo Henrique (contract expired after returning from loan)

== Competitions ==
=== Chinese Super League ===
==== Results summary ====
Overall								Home						Away					
Pld	W	D	L	GF	GA	GD	Pts	W	D	L	GF	GA	GD	W	D	L	GF	GA	GD
30	9	8	13	52	55	−3	35	5	4	6	31	24	+7	4	4	7	21	31	−10

Last updated: 4 November 2017.
Source: See Results

==== Results ====
5 March 2017 1	Shanghai Greenland Shenhua	4–0	Jiangsu Suning	Shanghai
19:35 (UTC+8)	Moreno 17', 86'; Sheng (yellow card) 29'; Tevez 36' (pen.); Junmin (yellow card) 44'; Lin (yellow card) 48'; Jianbin (yellow card) 61'; Jianqing 79'; Shilin (yellow card) 90'; Yun (yellow card) 90+3'	Report	Xiang (yellow card) 29'; Teixeira (yellow card) 45+1' (red card) 90+3'	Stadium: Hongkou Football Stadium; Attendance: 23,998; Referee: Wang Zhe

11 March 2017 2	Shanghai Greenland Shenhua	1–1	Tianjin Quanjian	Shanghai
19:35 (UTC+8)	Jin (yellow card) 21'; Sheng (red card) 24'; Moreno (yellow card) 27' (goal) 75'; Jiajun (yellow card) 90'	Report	Geuvânio (yellow card) 27'; Shanping (yellow card) 44'; Haolun (yellow card) 48'; Witsel (yellow card) 80' (goal) 85'	Stadium: Hongkou Football Stadium; Attendance: 23,666; Referee: Li Haixin

2 April 2017 3	Beijing Sinobo Guoan	2–1	Shanghai Greenland Shenhua	Beijing
19:35 (UTC+8)	Lei (yellow card) 9'; Yılmaz 37', 87'; Chiming (yellow card) 51'	Report	Junmin (yellow card) 16'; Yunding (yellow card) 21' (goal) 40'; Peng (yellow card) 37'; Shouting (yellow card) 60'	Stadium: Workers Stadium; Attendance: 53,056; Referee: Ma Ning

8 April 2017 4	Hebei China Fortune	4–2	Shanghai Greenland Shenhua	Qinhuangdao
19:35 (UTC+8)	Aloísio 14', 30' (yellow card) 15'; Hongbo 28'; Lavezzi (yellow card) 39'; Zhunyi 49'	Report	Guarín 12'; Junmin (yellow card) 35'; Shouting (yellow card) 42'; Moreno 48'	Stadium: Qinhuangdao Olympic Sports Center Stadium; Attendance: 18,293; Referee: Ma Li

15 April 2017 5	Changchun Yatai	2–3	Shanghai Greenland Shenhua	Changchun
15:00 (UTC+8)	Marinho (yellow card) 22'; Ighalo 40' (pen.), 50'; Xiaofei (yellow card) 42'	Report	Yunding (yellow card) 13' (goal) 52'; Guarín 18'; Jin (yellow card) 48'; Lin (yellow card) 70'; Jianbin (yellow card) 76'; Moreno 88'	Stadium: Development Area Stadium; Attendance: 11,826; Referee: Zhao Zhizhi

22 April 2017 6	Guizhou Hengfeng Zhicheng	0–2	Shanghai Greenland Shenhua	Guiyang
19:35 (UTC+8)	Ting (yellow card) 73'; Jun (yellow card) 76'	Report	Guarín 13'; Martins 36' (yellow card) 75'; Jianbin (yellow card) 45+1'; Shuai (yellow card) 85'	Stadium: Guiyang Olympic Sports Center; Attendance: 22,863; Referee: Xia Jun

5 May 2017 8	Guangzhou Evergrande Taobao	3–2	Shanghai Greenland Shenhua	Guangzhou
19:35 (UTC+8)	Paulinho 24' (yellow card) 45+1'; Shangyuan (yellow card) 45+3'; Jianbin 71' (o.g.); Xiaoting (yellow card) 83'; Hanchao 86'; Jian (yellow card) 90+1'	Report	Guarín 29' (yellow card) 45+2'; Jiajun (yellow card) 34'; Martins 45+2'; Shouting (yellow card) 62'; Moreno (yellow card) 69' (yellow-red card) 90+2'	Stadium: Tianhe Stadium; Attendance: 47,931; Referee: Guan Xing

13 May 2017 9	Henan Jianye	0–0	Shanghai Greenland Shenhua	Zhengzhou
19:35 (UTC+8)	Gomes (yellow card) 77'	Report	Jin (yellow card) 90+3'	Stadium: Zhengzhou Hanghai Stadium; Attendance: 18,773; Referee: Huang Yejun

20 May 2017 10	Shanghai Greenland Shenhua	1–3	Shanghai SIPG	Shanghai
15:30 (UTC+8)	Martins 42'; Li Yunqiu (yellow card) 45+1'; Li Jianbin (yellow card) 55'; Mao Jianqing (yellow card) 63'; Wang Shouting (yellow card) 75'	Report	Wu Lei 35' (yellow card) 90+3'; Shi Ke (yellow card) 63'; Cai Huikang (yellow card) 70'; Hulk 89' (yellow card) 89'; Li Yunqiu 90+2' (o.g.)	Stadium: Hongkou Football Stadium; Attendance: 15,983; Referee: Zhou Gang

26 May 2017 11	Guangzhou R&F	0–0	Shanghai Greenland Shenhua	Guangzhou
20:00 (UTC+8)	Zhi (yellow card) 70'	Report	Yunding (yellow card) 59'	Stadium: Yuexiushan Stadium; Attendance: 10,930; Referee: Ma Li

2 June 2017 12	Tianjin TEDA	2–1	Shanghai Greenland Shenhua	Tianjin
19:35 (UTC+8)	Ideye 36', 89'	Report	Peng (yellow card) 8' (yellow-red card) 78'; Martins 11'; Yunqiu (yellow card) 63'; Jianqing (yellow card) 84'	Stadium: Tianjin Tuanbo Football Stadium; Attendance: 11,688; Referee: Zhang Lei

17 June 2017 13	Shanghai Greenland Shenhua	2–2	Chongqing Dangdai Lifan	Shanghai
19:35 (UTC+8)	Jianrong (yellow card) 11'; Yunding 17'; Jianqing 58'	Report	Xinli 7'; Jung (yellow card) 19'; Kardec 43'; Xiaofei (yellow card) 79'	Stadium: Hongkou Football Stadium; Attendance: 15,269; Referee: Huang Yejun

24 June 2017 14	Yanbian Funde	0–2	Shanghai Greenland Shenhua	Yanji
15:30 (UTC+8)	Jin Chengjun (yellow card) 8'; Han Qingsong (yellow card) 41'	Report	Tevez 13'; Xu Junmin (yellow card) 26'; Cao Yunding 69'	Stadium: Yanji Nationwide Fitness Centre Stadium; Attendance: 18,751; Referee: Ma Ning

30 June 2017 15	Shanghai Greenland Shenhua	8–1	Liaoning Whowin	Shanghai
19:35 (UTC+8)	Guarín 11', 43'; Martins 13', 31'; Xiaotian 24' (o.g.); Moreno 41', 64'; Lu 90+2'	Summary	Ujah 62'	Stadium: Hongkou Football Stadium; Attendance: 16,668; Referee: Ma Li

8 July 2017 16	Jiangsu Suning	2–2	Shanghai Greenland Shenhua	Nanjing
19:35 (UTC+8)	Xi 2'; Teixeira 33' (pen.); Yun (yellow card) 55'; Chao (yellow card) 89'	Report	Yunqiu (yellow card) 44'; Shilin (yellow card) 53'; Moreno 82', 90+4'	Stadium: Nanjing Olympic Sports Centre; Attendance: 39,864; Referee: Ai Kun

16 July 2017 17	Tianjin Quanjian	3–0	Shanghai Greenland Shenhua	Tianjin
19:35 (UTC+8)	Xuri 23', 32'; Pato 51'; Yiming (yellow card) 88'	Report	Jianqing (yellow card) 90'; Tevez (yellow card) 90+1'	Stadium: Haihe Educational Football Stadium; Attendance: 25,716; Referee: Zhang Lei

23 July 2017 18	Shanghai Greenland Shenhua	1–2	Beijing Sinobo Guoan	Shanghai
19:35 (UTC+8)	Moreno 33'; Jin (yellow card) 56'; Lin (yellow card) 90+2'	Report	Pengxiang (yellow card) 14'; Soriano 31', 48' (pen.) (yellow card) 65'; Augusto (yellow card) 45'; Yang (yellow card) 53'; Zhi (yellow card) 90+2'	Stadium: Hongkou Football Stadium; Attendance: 19,895; Referee: Li Haixin

29 July 2017 19	Shanghai Greenland Shenhua	3–2	Hebei China Fortune	Shanghai
19:35 (UTC+8)	Shouting (yellow card) 34'; Moreno 60', 76'; Martins 77'; Shengjiong (yellow card) 90+6'	Report	Gervinho 4'; Senwen (yellow card) 19'; Xuesheng 23'; Chengdong (yellow card) 40'; Cheng (yellow card) 71'	Stadium: Hongkou Football Stadium; Attendance: 18,966; Referee: Gu Chunhan

5 August 2017 20	Shanghai Greenland Shenhua	1–1	Changchun Yatai	Shanghai
19:35 (UTC+8)	Kee-hee 90+3'	Report	Long 11'; Chao (yellow card) 30'	Stadium: Hongkou Football Stadium; Attendance: 18,249; Referee: Wang Jin

9 August 2017 21	Shanghai Greenland Shenhua	0–3	Guizhou Hengfeng Zhicheng	Shanghai
19:35 (UTC+8)	Yunqiu (yellow card) 23'; Shilin (yellow card) 47'; Yunding (yellow card) 68'; Lu (red card) 85'	Report	Junlin (yellow card) 28'; Wei 54'; Yunlong (yellow card) 70'; Suárez (yellow card) 90'; Castro 90+2', 90+4'	Stadium: Hongkou Football Stadium; Attendance: 18,677; Referee: Zhang Lei

12 August 2017 22	Shandong Luneng Taishan	5–0	Shanghai Greenland Shenhua	Jinan
19:35 (UTC+8)	Gil 22'; Cissé 34'; Pellè 39', 89'; Fei 55' (o.g.)	Report	Cong Zhen (yellow card) 8' (yellow-red card) 71'; Wang Shouting (yellow card) 16'; Li Peng (yellow card) 67'	Stadium: Jinan Olympic Sports Center Stadium; Attendance: 33,716; Referee: Guan Xing

19 August 2017 23	Shanghai Greenland Shenhua	0–3	Guangzhou Evergrande Taobao	Shanghai
19:35 (UTC+8)		Report	Xin (yellow card) 11'; Lin (yellow card) 27'; Muriqui 37', 47'; Goulart (yellow card) 46' (goal) 84'; Xuepeng (yellow card) 61'; Alan (yellow card) 90+2'	Stadium: Hongkou Football Stadium; Attendance: 17,970; Referee: Ma Ning

10 September 2017 24	Shanghai Greenland Shenhua	1–2	Henan Jianye	Shanghai
19:35 (UTC+8)	Shouting 45+1' (yellow card) 78'	Report	Vaz Tê 51', 90' (yellow card) 90'	Stadium: Hongkou Football Stadium; Attendance: 17,689; Referee: Ma Li

16 September 2017 25	Shanghai SIPG	6–1	Shanghai Greenland Shenhua	Shanghai
19:35 (UTC+8)	Hulk 56', 75'; Wu Lei 58', 63'; Ahmedov 60'; Wei Zhen (yellow card) 81'; Li Shenglong 82'; Cai Huikang (yellow card) 90+1'	Report	Wang Shouting (yellow card) 29'; Li Yunqiu (yellow card) 37'; Tevez 61'	Stadium: Shanghai Stadium; Referee: Ai Kun

19 September 2017 7	Shanghai Greenland Shenhua	0–0	Shandong Luneng Taishan	Shanghai
19:35 (UTC+8)	Moreno (yellow card) 60'; Lin (yellow card) 62'; Yunding (yellow card) 70'; Shilin (yellow card) 90+4'	Report	Chi (yellow card) 18'; Gil (yellow card) 30'; Pellè (yellow card) 70'	Stadium: Hongkou Football Stadium; Attendance: 18,023; Referee: Zhao Zhizhi

23 September 2017 26	Shanghai Greenland Shenhua	3–1	Guangzhou R&F	Shanghai
19:35 (UTC+8)	Guarín 29'; Shouting (yellow card) 38'; Moreno 47' (pen.), 90+2'	Report	Gong (yellow card) 28'; Zhengyu (yellow card) 36'; Teng (yellow card) 45'; Zhi 56'	Stadium: Hongkou Football Stadium; Attendance: 21,361; Referee: Wang Zhe

15 October 2017 27	Shanghai Greenland Shenhua	1–2	Tianjin TEDA	Shanghai
19:35 (UTC+8)	Jianqing 10'; Guarín (yellow card) 62'; Jinhao (yellow card) 67'	Report	Diagne 7' (pen.), 90+1'; Mikel (yellow card) 73'; Mirahmetjan (yellow card) 77'	Stadium: Hongkou Football Stadium; Attendance: 19,110; Referee: Tony Chapron (France)

22 October 2017 28	Chongqing Dangdai Lifan	1–1	Shanghai Greenland Shenhua	Chongqing
19:35 (UTC+8)	Kardec 4'	Report	Shouting (yellow card) 28'; Jiajun 30' (yellow card) 68'	Stadium: Chongqing Olympic Sports Center; Referee: Drew Fischer (Canada)

29 October 2017 29	Shanghai Greenland Shenhua	5–1	Yanbian Funde	Shanghai
15:00 (UTC+8)	Moreno 6'; Guarín 13', 82' (pen.); Tevez 34'; Jianrong 85'; Jiajun (yellow card) 90+5'	Report	Guanghui (yellow card) 78'; Trawally 79'; Shihao (yellow card) 90+1'	Stadium: Hongkou Football Stadium; Attendance: 19,798; Referee: Fu Ming

4 November 2017 30	Liaoning Whowin	1–4	Shanghai Greenland Shenhua	Shenyang
15:00 (UTC+8)	Chenglin (yellow card) 30'; Hao 53'	Report	Jianrong 18', 32'; Guarín 75' (pen.); Yunding 90'	Stadium: Tiexi New District Sports Center; Referee: Wang Jin

==== Table ====
Pos	Team	Pld	W	D	L	GF	GA	GD	Pts	Qualification or relegation
9	Beijing Sinobo Guoan	30	11	7	12	42	42	0	40	
10	Chongqing Dangdai Lifan	30	9	9	12	37	40	−3	36	
11	Shanghai Greenland Shenhua (Note: Shanghai Greenland Shenhua qualified for the 2018 AFC Champions League group stage as 2017 Chinese FA Cup winners.)	30	9	8	13	52	55	−3	35	Qualification to Champions League group stage
12	Jiangsu Suning	30	7	11	12	40	45	−5	32	
13	Tianjin TEDA	30	8	7	15	30	49	−19	31	

Source: League table
Rules for classification: 1) Points; 2) Head-to-head points; 3) Head-to-head goal difference; 4) Head-to-head goals scored; 5) Reserve league points; 6) Goal difference; 7) Goals scored; 8) Disciplinary points (1 point for each yellow card, 3 points for each red card); 9) Draw

=== Chinese FA Cup ===
2 May 2017 Third Round	Yunnan Lijiang	0–3	Shanghai Greenland Shenhua	Lijiang
15:00 (UTC+8)	Xu (yellow card) 34'	Summary	Guarín 22'; Martins 32' (yellow card) 36'; Jianqing (yellow card) 72' (goal) 88'; Yunding (yellow card) 77'	Stadium: Lijiang Stadium; Attendance: 3,681; Referee: Zhou Gang

21 June 2017 Fourth Round	Shanghai Greenland Shenhua	1–0	Beijing Sinobo Guoan	Shanghai
20:00 (UTC+8)	Guarín 52'; Jianbin (yellow card) 73'	Summary	Yılmaz (yellow card) 12'	Stadium: Hongkou Football Stadium; Attendance: 15,669; Referee: Shi Zhenlu

19 July 2017 Fifth Round 1st Leg	Shandong Luneng Taishan	1–3	Shanghai Greenland Shenhua	Jinan
20:00 (UTC+8)	Zheng (yellow card) 20'; Wei (yellow card) 23'; Pellè (yellow card) 24'; Gil (yellow card) 60'; Junmin 62'; Jingdao (yellow card) 90+4'	Summary	Martins 2', 29'; Jianbin (yellow card) 36'; Jianqing 68'; Yunqiu (yellow card) 89'	Stadium: Jinan Olympic Sports Center Stadium; Referee: Ma Ning

2 August 2017 Fifth Round 2nd Leg	Shanghai Greenland Shenhua	0–0 (3–1 agg.)	Shandong Luneng Taishan	Shanghai
19:35 (UTC+8)		Summary	Junshuai (yellow card) 33'; Lin (yellow card) 60'; Wei (yellow card) 75'	Stadium: Hongkou Football Stadium; Attendance: 18,238; Referee: Shi Zhenlu

15 August 2017 Semi-Final 1st Leg	Shanghai Greenland Shenhua	1–0	Shanghai Shenxin	Shanghai
19:35 (UTC+8)	Kee-hee 54'; Shilin (yellow card) 72'; Jin (yellow card) 79'	Summary	Zuojun (yellow card) 8'; Chongqiu (yellow card) 25'	Stadium: Hongkou Football Stadium; Attendance: 18,697; Referee: Huang Yejun

29 September 2017 Semi-Final 2nd Leg	Shanghai Shenxin	0–1 (0–2 agg.)	Shanghai Greenland Shenhua	Shanghai
19:35 (UTC+8)		Summary	Martins 79'	Stadium: Jinshan Football Stadium; Referee: Shi Zhenlu

==== Final ====
19 November 2017 1st Leg	Shanghai Greenland Shenhua	1–0	Shanghai SIPG	Shanghai
19:35 (UTC+08)	Yunding (yellow card) 30'; Martins 38'; Shuai (yellow card) 90+2'	Summary	Huikang (yellow card) 25'; Hulk (yellow card) 59'; Oscar (yellow card) 71'	Stadium: Hongkou Football Stadium; Attendance: 24,319; Referee: Jumpei Iida (Japan)

26 November 2017 2nd Leg	Shanghai SIPG	3–2 (3–3 agg.)	Shanghai Greenland Shenhua	Shanghai
20:00 (UTC+08)	Yi (yellow card) 14'; Wenjun 15'; Huan (yellow card) 45+2' (yellow-red card) 90+5'; Hulk 72' (pen.); Moreno 76' (o.g.); Shenchao (yellow card) 82'; Ke (yellow card) 85'	[ Summary]	Sheng (yellow card) 20'; Yunding 44'; Jiajun (yellow card) 56'; Martins 67' (yellow card) 75'	Stadium: Shanghai Stadium; Referee: Ted Unkel (United States)

3–3 on aggregate. Shanghai Greenland Shenhua won on away goals.

=== AFC Champions League ===
==== Qualifying stage ====
8 February 2017 Play-off round	Shanghai Greenland Shenhua (China)	0–2	(Australia) Brisbane Roar	Shanghai, China
19:45 (UTC+8)	Sheng (yellow card) 73'	Summary	Borrello 2'; Oar 40'; McKay (yellow card) 77'	Stadium: Hongkou Football Stadium; Attendance: 23,980; Referee: Valentin Kovalenko (Uzbekistan)

== Squad statistics ==
As of match played 26 November 2017

=== Appearances and goals ===
No.	Pos	Nat	Player	Total		Super League		FA Cup		Champions League	
No.	Pos	Nat	Player	Apps	Goals	Apps	Goals	Apps	Goals	Apps	Goals
2	DF	(China) CHN	Xiong Fei	5	0	3+1	0	1	0	0	0
3	DF	(China) CHN	Li Jianbin	12	0	9+1	0	2	0	0	0
4	DF	(South Korea) KOR	Kim Kee-hee	17	2	15	1	1	1	1	0
5	MF	(China) CHN	Wang Shouting	26	1	13+9	1	1+3	0	0	0
6	DF	(China) CHN	Li Peng	12	0	8+1	0	3	0	0	0
7	FW	(China) CHN	Mao Jianqing	35	5	10+17	3	2+5	2	0+1	0
8	MF	(China) CHN	Zhang Lu	17	1	3+8	1	0+5	0	0+1	0
10	MF	(Colombia) COL	Giovanni Moreno	34	15	24+2	15	7	0	1	0
11	MF	(China) CHN	Lü Zheng	11	0	3+6	0	0+2	0	0	0
12	GK	(China) CHN	Chen Zhao	0	0	0	0	0	0	0	0
13	MF	(Colombia) COL	Fredy Guarín	23	12	17+1	10	5	2	0	0
15	FW	(China) CHN	Zhu Jianrong	11	3	6+5	3	0	0	0	0
16	DF	(China) CHN	Li Yunqiu	29	0	18+3	0	8	0	0	0
17	FW	(Nigeria) NGR	Obafemi Martins	21	13	13	7	7	6	1	0
21	GK	(China) CHN	Shen Jun	0	0	0	0	0	0	0	0
22	GK	(China) CHN	Qiu Shengjiong	4	0	3	0	1	0	0	0
23	DF	(China) CHN	Bai Jiajun	19	1	15	1	3	0	1	0
25	DF	(China) CHN	Wang Lin	30	0	22+2	0	4+1	0	1	0
26	MF	(China) CHN	Qin Sheng	10	0	5	0	3+1	0	1	0
27	GK	(China) CHN	Li Shuai	35	0	27	0	7	0	1	0
28	MF	(China) CHN	Cao Yunding	32	6	20+6	5	5	1	1	0
29	MF	(China) CHN	Xu Junmin	17	0	14+1	0	2	0	0	0
30	DF	(China) CHN	Tao Jin	27	0	17+3	0	5+1	0	1	0
31	MF	(China) CHN	Wang Wei	0	0	0	0	0	0	0	0
32	FW	(Argentina) ARG	Carlos Tevez	20	4	14+2	4	3	0	1	0
33	MF	(China) CHN	Liu Jiawei	1	0	0+1	0	0	0	0	0
34	DF	(China) CHN	Bi Jinhao	24	0	16+2	0	6	0	0	0
35	MF	(China) CHN	Lü Pin	6	0	5	0	1	0	0	0
36	MF	(China) CHN	Liu Ruofan	6	0	2+1	0	3	0	0	0
37	MF	(China) CHN	Sun Shilin	33	0	19+5	0	5+3	0	1	0
38	MF	(China) CHN	Chen Tao	1	0	0+1	0	0	0	0	0
39	MF	(China) CHN	Cong Zhen	11	0	9	0	2	0	0	0
Players who away from the club on loan:
20	MF	(China) CHN	Wang Yun	6	0	0+4	0	1	0	0+1	0
Players who left Shanghai Greenland Shenhua during the season:

=== Goal scorers ===
Place	Position	Nation	Number	Name	Super League	FA Cup	Champions League	Total
1	MF	(Colombia)	10	Giovanni Moreno	15	0	0	15
2	FW	(Nigeria)	17	Obafemi Martins	7	6	0	13
3	MF	(Colombia)	13	Fredy Guarín	10	2	0	12
4	MF	(China)	28	Cao Yunding	5	1	0	6
5	FW	(China)	7	Mao Jianqing	3	2	0	5
6	FW	(Argentina)	32	Carlos Tevez	4	0	0	4
7	FW	(China)	15	Zhu Jianrong	3	0	0	3
8	DF	(South Korea)	4	Kim Kee-hee	1	1	0	2
9	MF	(China)	8	Zhang Lu	1	0	0	1
9	MF	(China)	5	Wang Shouting	1	0	0	1
9	DF	(China)	23	Bai Jiajun	1	0	0	1
9				Own goal	1	0	0	1
				TOTALS	52	12	0	64

=== Disciplinary record ===
Number	Nation	Position	Name	Super League			FA Cup			Champions League			Total		
Number	Nation	Position	Name	Yellow card	(yellow card) (yellow-red card)	Red card	Yellow card	(yellow card) (yellow-red card)	Red card	Yellow card	(yellow card) (yellow-red card)	Red card	Yellow card	(yellow card) (yellow-red card)	Red card
3	(China)	DF	Li Jianbin	4	0	0	2	0	0	0	0	0	6	0	0
5	(China)	MF	Wang Shouting	10	0	0	0	0	0	0	0	0	10	0	0
6	(China)	DF	Li Peng	2	1	0	0	0	0	0	0	0	2	1	0
7	(China)	FW	Mao Jianqing	3	0	0	1	0	0	0	0	0	4	0	0
8	(China)	MF	Zhang Lu	0	0	1	0	0	0	0	0	0	0	0	1
10	(Colombia)	MF	Giovanni Moreno	2	1	0	0	0	0	0	0	0	2	1	0
13	(Colombia)	MF	Fredy Guarín	2	0	0	0	0	0	0	0	0	2	0	0
15	(China)	FW	Zhu Jianrong	1	0	0	0	0	0	0	0	0	1	0	0
16	(China)	DF	Li Yunqiu	5	0	0	1	0	0	0	0	0	6	0	0
17	(Nigeria)	FW	Obafemi Martins	1	0	0	2	0	0	0	0	0	3	0	0
20	(China)	MF	Wang Yun	1	0	0	0	0	0	0	0	0	1	0	0
22	(China)	GK	Qiu Shengjiong	1	0	0	0	0	0	0	0	0	1	0	0
23	(China)	DF	Bai Jiajun	4	0	0	1	0	0	0	0	0	5	0	0
25	(China)	DF	Wang Lin	4	0	0	0	0	0	0	0	0	4	0	0
26	(China)	MF	Qin Sheng	1	0	1	1	0	0	1	0	0	3	0	1
27	(China)	GK	Li Shuai	1	0	0	1	0	0	0	0	0	2	0	0
28	(China)	MF	Cao Yunding	5	0	0	2	0	0	0	0	0	7	0	0
29	(China)	MF	Xu Junmin	4	0	0	0	0	0	0	0	0	4	0	0
30	(China)	DF	Tao Jin	4	0	0	1	0	0	0	0	0	5	0	0
32	(Argentina)	FW	Carlos Tevez	1	0	0	0	0	0	0	0	0	1	0	0
34	(China)	DF	Bi Jinhao	1	0	0	0	0	0	0	0	0	1	0	0
37	(China)	MF	Sun Shilin	4	0	0	1	0	0	0	0	0	5	0	0
39	(China)	MF	Cong Zhen	0	1	0	0	0	0	0	0	0	0	1	0
			TOTALS	61	3	2	13	0	0	1	0	0	75	3	2
