= 2016 Shanghai Greenland Shenhua F.C. season =

Shanghai Shenhua
- Chairman: Wu Xiaohui
- Manager: Gregorio Manzano
- Stadium: Hongkou Football Stadium
- Super League: 4th
- FA Cup: Semi-final (vs. Jiangsu Suning)
- Top goalscorer: League: Demba Ba (14 goals); All: Demba Ba (17 goals)
- Average home league attendance: league: 22,665 all: 21,760
| Home colours | Away colours |

The 2016 season was Shanghai Greenland Shenhua's 13th season in the Chinese Super League and 54th overall in the Chinese top flight. They also competed in the Chinese FA Cup.

== Squad ==
As of 1 March 2016

Note: Flags indicate national team as defined under FIFA eligibility rules; some limited exceptions apply. Players may hold more than one non-FIFA nationality.

| No. | Pos. | Nation | Player |
|---|---|---|---|
| 1 | GK | CHN | Geng Xiaofeng |
| 2 | DF | CHN | Xiong Fei |
| 3 | DF | CHN | Li Jianbin |
| 4 | DF | KOR | Kim Kee-Hee |
| 5 | MF | CHN | Wang Shouting |
| 6 | DF | CHN | Li Wenbo |
| 8 | MF | CHN | Zhang Lu |
| 9 | FW | SEN | Demba Ba |
| 10 | MF | COL | Giovanni Moreno (Captain) |
| 11 | FW | CHN | Lü Zheng |
| 13 | MF | COL | Fredy Guarín |
| 16 | DF | CHN | Li Yunqiu |
| 17 | FW | NGR | Obafemi Martins |
| 18 | FW | CHN | Gao Di |
| 19 | DF | CHN | Zheng Kaimu |

| No. | Pos. | Nation | Player |
|---|---|---|---|
| 20 | MF | CHN | Wang Yun (Vice-captain) |
| 22 | GK | CHN | Qiu Shengjiong |
| 23 | DF | CHN | Bai Jiajun |
| 24 | MF | CHN | Deng Zhuoxiang |
| 25 | DF | CHN | Wang Lin |
| 26 | MF | CHN | Qin Sheng |
| 27 | GK | CHN | Li Shuai |
| 28 | MF | CHN | Cao Yunding |
| 30 | DF | CHN | Tao Jin |
| 32 | FW | CHN | Xu Junmin |
| 33 | DF | CHN | Bi Jinhao |
| 35 | FW | CHN | Gao Shipeng |
| 36 | MF | CHN | Xu Jun |
| 37 | DF | CHN | Cao Chuanyu |
| 38 | MF | CHN | Chen Tao |

=== Reserve squad ===
Note: Flags indicate national team as defined under FIFA eligibility rules; some limited exceptions apply. Players may hold more than one non-FIFA nationality.

| No. | Pos. | Nation | Player |
|---|---|---|---|
| 41 | MF | CHN | Cong Zhen |
| 42 | DF | CHN | Luo Xi |
| 43 | MF | CHN | Xiao Bang |
| 44 | FW | CHN | Yuan Yisheng |
| 45 | MF | CHN | Yan Ge |
| 46 | DF | CHN | Zhang Shu |
| 47 | DF | CHN | Cao Dong |
| 48 | FW | CHN | Xiao Yandong |
| 49 | DF | CHN | Shan Haiyang |
| 50 | MF | CHN | Yang Chengyun |

| No. | Pos. | Nation | Player |
|---|---|---|---|
| 51 | MF | CHN | Zhan Yilin |
| 52 | MF | CHN | Zhang Jiangyi |
| 53 | MF | CHN | Xu Guanbin |
| 54 | DF | CHN | Su Qi |
| 55 | GK | CHN | Shen Jun |
| 56 | FW | CHN | Lan Wensen |
| 57 | MF | CHN | Wang Fei |
| 58 | MF | CHN | Xiong Zhenfeng |
| 59 | DF | CHN | Xu Wu |
| 60 | GK | CHN | Jiang Yutao |

=== On loan ===
Note: Flags indicate national team as defined under FIFA eligibility rules; some limited exceptions apply. Players may hold more than one non-FIFA nationality.

| No. | Pos. | Nation | Player |
|---|---|---|---|
| — | GK | CHN | Bai Shuo (at Atlético Museros) |
| — | GK | CHN | Zhu Yueqi (at Atlético Museros) |
| — | DF | HKG | Brian Fok (at AZAL) |
| — | DF | CHN | Li Xiaoming (at Henan Jianye) |
| — | DF | CHN | Xu Yougang (at Qingdao Huanghai) |
| — | DF | CHN | Leng Shiao (at Qingdao Huanghai) |
| — | DF | CHN | Huang Bowen (at Wuhan Zall) |
| — | DF | CHN | Deng Biao (at Atlético Museros) |
| — | DF | CHN | Gong Jinshuai (at Atlético Museros) |
| — | MF | CHN | Pan Weihao (at Qingdao Huanghai) |
| — | MF | CHN | Zhang Yuhao (at CF Cracks) |
| — | MF | CHN | Li Lianxiang (at CF Cracks) |

| No. | Pos. | Nation | Player |
|---|---|---|---|
| — | MF | CHN | Liao Zhilüe (at CF Cracks) |
| — | MF | CHN | Su Shun (at Atlético Museros) |
| — | MF | CHN | Liu Jiawei (at Atlético Museros) |
| — | MF | CHN | Yan Xinyu (at Atlético Museros) |
| — | MF | CHN | Lü Pin (at Atlético Museros) |
| — | MF | CHN | Chen Qiyuan (at Atlético Museros) |
| — | MF | CHN | Chen Xiaomao (at Atlético Museros) |
| — | MF | CHN | Yang Haofeng (at Atlético Museros) |
| — | MF | CHN | Cui Qi (at Atlético Museros) |
| — | FW | CHN | Wu Changqi (at Atlético Museros) |
| — | FW | CHN | Zhou Jiahao (at Atlético Museros) |

== Transfers ==
=== Winter ===
In: Note: Flags indicate national team as defined under FIFA eligibility rules; some limited exceptions apply. Players may hold more than one non-FIFA nationality.

| No. | Pos. | Nation | Player |
|---|---|---|---|
| 4 | DF | KOR | Kim Kee-Hee (from (South Korea) Jeonbuk Hyundai Motors) |
| 13 | MF | COL | Fredy Guarín (from (Italy) Inter Milan) |
| 16 | DF | CHN | Li Yunqiu (from Beijing Guoan) |
| 17 | FW | NGR | Obafemi Martins (from (United States) Seattle Sounders FC) |
| 25 | DF | CHN | Wang Lin (from Hangzhou Greentown) |
| 26 | MF | CHN | Qin Sheng (from Liaoning Whowin) |
| 27 | GK | CHN | Li Shuai (from Guangzhou Evergrande Taobao) |
| 33 | FW | CHN | Bi Jinhao (from Henan Jianye) |
| 41 | MF | CHN | Cong Zhen (from Dalian Transcendence) |
| 57 | MF | CHN | Wang Fei (loan return from Nei Mongol Zhongyou) |

Out: Note: Flags indicate national team as defined under FIFA eligibility rules; some limited exceptions apply. Players may hold more than one non-FIFA nationality.

| No. | Pos. | Nation | Player |
|---|---|---|---|
| 4 | DF | GRE | Avraam Papadopoulos (Released) |
| 14 | MF | MLI | Mohamed Sissoko (Released) |
| 17 | MF | AUS | Tim Cahill (to Hangzhou Greentown) |
| 21 | MF | CHN | Jiang Kun (to Qingdao Huanghai) |
| 25 | MF | CHN | Su Shun (Released) |
| 27 | MF | CHN | Liu Jiawei (loan to (Spain) Atlético Museros) |
| 29 | MF | CHN | Fan Lingjiang (to Qingdao Huanghai) |
| 37 | MF | CHN | Han Yi (Released) |
| 39 | DF | CHN | Zhang Zongzheng (to Qingdao Huanghai) |
| 40 | FW | CHN | Xu Qi (Released) |
| 41 | DF | CHN | Liang Wei (Released) |
| 42 | MF | CHN | Zhang Jiawei (Released) |
| 43 | MF | CHN | Xie Fuquan (Released) |
| 44 | MF | CHN | Bo Xiaobo (Released) |
| 47 | MF | CHN | Liao Zhilüe (loan to (Spain) CF Cracks) |
| 49 | MF | CHN | Zhang Zhongyuan (Released) |
| 50 | GK | CHN | Dong Guangxiang (Released) |
| 53 | MF | CHN | Yang Chen (to Yinchuan Helanshan) |
| 54 | DF | HKG | Brian Fok (loan to (Romania) ACS Berceni) |
| 55 | DF | CHN | Li Xiaoming (loan to Henan Jianye) |
| 56 | DF | CHN | Xu Yougang (loan to Qingdao Huanghai) |
| 59 | MF | CHN | Huang Jie (to Yinchuan Helanshan) |
| 60 | MF | CHN | Chen Junjie (Released) |
| 61 | FW | CHN | Piao Lei (to Hebei China Fortune) |
| - | DF | CHN | Leng Shiao (loan to Qingdao Huanghai, previously on loan to (Spain) Atlético Museros) |
| - | MF | CHN | Pan Weihao (loan to Qingdao Huanghai, previously on loan to (Spain) Atlético Museros) |
| - | DF | CHN | Huang Bowen (loan to Wuhan Zall, previously on loan to (Spain) Atlético Museros) |
| - | MF | CHN | Cui Qi (loan to (Spain) Atlético Museros) |
| - | MF | CHN | Yang Haofeng (loan to (Spain) Atlético Museros) |
| - | FW | ARG | Lucas Viatri (to (Argentina) Estudiantes LP, previously on loan to (Argentina) Banfield) |

=== Summer ===
In:

| No. | Pos. | Nation | Player |
|---|---|---|---|
| - | MF | CHN | Yang Haofeng (loan return from Atlético Museros) |
| - | GK | CHN | Bai Shuo (loan return from Atlético Museros) |
| - | MF | CHN | Li Lianxiang (loan return from CF Cracks) |

Out:

| No. | Pos. | Nation | Player |
|---|---|---|---|
| 54 | DF | HKG | Brian Fok (loan to (Azerbaijan) AZAL, previously on loan to (Romania) ACS Berceni) |
| - | MF | CHN | Yang Haofeng (loan to Shanghai JuJu Sports) |
| - | GK | CHN | Bai Shuo (loan to Shanghai JuJu Sports) |
| - | MF | CHN | Li Lianxiang (loan to Shanghai JuJu Sports) |
| - | DF | ZAM | Stoppila Sunzu (to (France) Lille OSC, previously on loan) |
| - | FW | BRA | Paulo Henrique (loan to (Portugal) Estoril) |

== Competitions ==
=== Chinese Super League ===
==== Results summary ====
| Overall | | | | | | | | Home | | | | | | Away | | | | | |
| Pld | W | D | L | GF | GA | GD | Pts | W | D | L | GF | GA | GD | W | D | L | GF | GA | GD |
|---|---|---|---|---|---|---|---|---|---|---|---|---|---|---|---|---|---|---|---|
| 30 | 12 | 12 | 6 | 46 | 31 | +15 | 48 | 9 | 6 | 0 | 33 | 14 | +19 | 3 | 6 | 6 | 13 | 17 | −4 |

Last updated: 31 October 2016.
Source: See Results

==== Results ====
| 5 March 2016 1 | Shanghai Greenland Shenhua | 1 – 1 | Yanbian Fude | Shanghai |
| 19:35 (UTC+8) | Kim (yellow card) 39'; Ba 88' (pen.) | Summary | Hongquan (yellow card) 20'; Ha 54'; Petković (yellow card) 69' | Stadium: Hongkou Football Stadium; Attendance: 23,835; Referee: Hei Xiaohu |

| 11 March 2016 2 | Shanghai SIPG | 1 – 1 | Shanghai Greenland Shenhua | Shanghai |
| 19:35 (UTC+8) | Ke (yellow card) 10'; Huikang 43'; Kim (yellow card) 55' | Summary | Moreno 7'; Yunqiu 73'; Guarín (yellow card) 86' | Stadium: Shanghai Stadium; Attendance: 46,537; Referee: Fu Ming |

| 3 April 2016 3 | Shanghai Greenland Shenhua | 3 – 1 | Shijiazhuang Ever Bright | Shanghai |
| 19:35 (UTC+08) | Ba 5', 43', 58'; Sheng (yellow card) 57' | Summary | Micael (yellow card) 21'; Jianqing 50'; Mulenga (yellow card) 78'; Chunyu (red card) 81' | Stadium: Hongkou Football Stadium; Attendance: 21,647; Referee: Ma Li |

| 10 April 2016 4 | Shanghai Greenland Shenhua | 0 – 0 | Shandong Luneng Taishan | Shanghai |
| 12:35 (UTC+08) | Jinhao (yellow card) 4' | Summary | Xu (yellow card) 52'; Lin (yellow card) 58' | Stadium: Hongkou Football Stadium; Attendance: 23,677; Referee: Wang Zhe |

| 16 April 2016 5 | Jiangsu Suning | 2 – 0 | Shanghai Greenland Shenhua | Nanjing |
| 19:35 (UTC+08) | Hang (yellow card) 16' (goal) 83', 90+1'; Ang (yellow card) 19'; Sainsbury (yellow card) 45'; Xiaobin (yellow card) 71' | Summary | Moreno (yellow card) 62' | Stadium: Nanjing Olympic Sports Centre; Attendance: 45,418; Referee: Zhou Gang |

| 24 April 2016 6 | Shanghai Greenland Shenhua | 2 – 0 | Hebei China Fortune | Shanghai |
| 19:35 (UTC+08) | Gülüm 7' (o.g.); Moreno 10' (pen.); Zheng (yellow card) 57' (yellow-red card) 83'; Jiajun (yellow card) 71' | Summary | Gülüm (yellow card) 9'; Mbia (yellow card) 18' | Stadium: Hongkou Football Stadium; Attendance: 23,859; Referee: Huang Yejun |

| 30 April 2016 7 | Guangzhou Evergrande Taobao | 2 – 1 | Shanghai Greenland Shenhua | Guangzhou |
| 19:35 (UTC+08) | Zhi (yellow card) 14'; Alan 40', 71'; Bowen (yellow card) 45+4' | Summary | Guarín (yellow card) 45+4'; Sheng (yellow card) 52'; Moreno (yellow card) 62'; Ba 69' | Stadium: Tianhe Stadium; Attendance: 48,396; Referee: Hai Tan |

| 7 May 2016 8 | Liaoning Whowin | 0 – 0 | Shanghai Greenland Shenhua | Shenyang |
| 15:30 (UTC+08) | Touré (yellow card) 39'; Liang (yellow card) 90' | Summary | Jiajun (yellow card) 6'; Jianbin (yellow card) 65' | Stadium: Shenyang Olympic Sports Center Stadium; Attendance: 21,307; Referee: Fan Qi |

| 15 May 2016 9 | Shanghai Greenland Shenhua | 5 – 1 | Guangzhou R&F | Shanghai |
| 19:35 (UTC+08) | Zheng 5'; Jianbin (yellow card) 21' (yellow-red card) 89'; Sheng (yellow card) 53'; Yunqiu (yellow card) 61'; Moreno 66'; Yunding 76'; Ba 84'; Martins 86' | Summary | Zhi 11'; Svensson (yellow card) 31'; Bruninho (yellow card) 45+1' | Stadium: Hongkou Football Stadium; Attendance: 19,692; Referee: Zhao Zhizhi |

| 22 May 2016 10 | Chongqing Lifan | 0 – 1 | Shanghai Greenland Shenhua | Chongqing |
| 19:35 (UTC+08) | Fernandinho (yellow card) 76' | Summary | Milović 22' (o.g.); Jiajun (yellow card) 32' | Stadium: Chongqing Olympic Sports Center; Attendance: 35,518; Referee: Hai Tan |

| 27 May 2016 11 | Shanghai Greenland Shenhua | 2 – 2 | Tianjin Teda | Shanghai |
| 19:35 (UTC+08) | Ba 35'; Guarín (yellow card) 55'; Kim 69' | Summary | Wágner 25'; Haibin (yellow card) 49'; Diagne 52' (yellow card) 90+5'; Tao (yellow card) 90+4' | Stadium: Hongkou Football Stadium; Attendance: 22,167; Referee: Zhou Gang |

| 11 June 2016 12 | Henan Jianye | 1 – 1 | Shanghai Greenland Shenhua | Zhengzhou |
| 19:35 (UTC+08) | Muzepper (yellow card) 16'; Patiño 27'; Gomes (yellow card) 33'; Hao (yellow card) 43' | Summary | Ba 5'; Guarín (yellow card) 26'; Moreno (yellow card) 31' (yellow-red card) 90+2'; Fei (yellow card) 40' | Stadium: Zhengzhou Hanghai Stadium; Attendance: 19,641; Referee: Zhao Zhizhi |

| 15 June 2016 21 | Hebei China Fortune | 2 – 2 | Shanghai Greenland Shenhua | Qinhuangdao |
| 19:35 (UTC+08) | Mbia 27', 67'; Gülüm (yellow card) 53' | Summary | Yunding 15'; Ba 45+2' (yellow card) 84'; Zheng (yellow card) 75' | Stadium: Qinhuangdao Olympic Sports Center Stadium; Attendance: 15,453; Referee: Huang Yejun |

| 19 June 2016 13 | Shanghai Greenland Shenhua | 4 – 0 | Hangzhou Greentown | Shanghai |
| 19:35 (UTC+08) | Sheng (yellow card) 4'; Ba 42', 74', 81'; Martins 88' | Summary | Zhen (yellow card) 12' | Stadium: Hongkou Football Stadium; Attendance: 24,185; Referee: Fan Qi |

| 25 June 2016 14 | Beijing Guoan | 2 – 1 | Shanghai Greenland Shenhua | Beijing |
| 19:35 (UTC+08) | Chengdong (yellow card) 43'; Hejing (yellow card) 59'; Xizhe 66', 69'; Xinxin (yellow card) 71'; Dabao (red card) 84' | Summary | Ba (yellow card) 23' (goal) 83'; Kim (yellow card) 79' | Stadium: Workers' Stadium; Attendance: 43,370; Referee: Ma Ning |

| 3 July 2016 15 | Shanghai Greenland Shenhua | 3 – 0 | Changchun Yatai | Shanghai |
| 19:35 (UTC+08) | Jianbin 51'; Ba 67' (yellow card) 71'; Martins 90+4' | Summary | Xiaodong (yellow card) 60' | Stadium: Hongkou Football Stadium; Attendance: 20,866; Referee: Gu Chunhan |

| 9 July 2016 16 | Yanbian Funde | 2 – 0 | Shanghai Greenland Shenhua | Yanji |
| 15:30 (UTC+08) | Petković 70' (pen.); Yoon (yellow card) 77'; Yongchun (yellow card) 77'; Trawally (yellow card) 83'; Kim 89' | Summary | Lu (yellow card) 38'; Guarín (yellow card) 68'; Sheng (yellow card) 72'; Moreno (yellow card) 83' | Stadium: Yanji Nationwide Fitness Centre Stadium; Attendance: 17,856; Referee: Huang Yejun |

| 17 July 2016 17 | Shanghai Greenland Shenhua | 2 – 1 | Shanghai SIPG | Shanghai |
| 19:35 (UTC+08) | Qin Sheng (yellow card) 26'; Xiong Fei (yellow card) 29'; Moreno (yellow card) 40'; Bai Jiajun (yellow card) 76' (yellow-red card) 90+10'; Cao Yunding 87'; Guarín 90+5' (pen.) | Summary | Yan Junling (yellow card) 40'; Fu Huan (yellow card) 42'; Wu Lei 55'; Shi Ke (yellow card) 89'; Wang Jiajie (red card) 90+4'; Cai Huikang (yellow card) 90+7'; Wang Shenchao (yellow card) 90+9' | Stadium: Hongkou Football Stadium; Attendance: 24,087; Referee: Zhou Gang |

| 21 July 2016 18 | Shijiazhuang Ever Bright | 2 – 1 | Shanghai Greenland Shenhua | Shijiazhuang |
| 19:35 (UTC+08) | Jianqing 55'; Jianjun (yellow card) 72'; Cho 75' | Summary | Jianbin (yellow card) 3'; Martins 18'; Yunding (yellow card) 84' | Stadium: Yutong International Sports Center; Attendance: 24,051; Referee: Fan Qi |

| 24 July 2016 19 | Shandong Luneng Taishan | 0 – 1 | Shanghai Greenland Shenhua | Jinan |
| 19:35 (UTC+08) | | Summary | Moreno 32'; Sheng (yellow card) 36'; Shuai (yellow card) 80'; Jianbin (yellow card) 83' | Stadium: Jinan Olympic Sports Center Stadium; Attendance: 30,845; Referee: Zhao Zhizhi |

| 30 July 2016 20 | Shanghai Greenland Shenhua | 3 – 2 | Jiangsu Suning | Shanghai |
| 19:35 (UTC+08) | Guarín 29' (pen.), 80'; Moreno (yellow card) 36'; Sheng (yellow card) 57'; Martins 59' | Summary | Martínez 21', 42' (yellow card) 45' | Stadium: Hongkou Football Stadium; Attendance: 23,969; Referee: Ma Li |

| 13 August 2016 22 | Shanghai Greenland Shenhua | 2 – 1 | Guangzhou Evergrande Taobao | Shanghai |
| 19:35 (UTC+08) | Martins 5', 42'; Fei (yellow card) 28'; Kim (yellow card) 56'; Yun (yellow card) 71'; Guarín (yellow card) 72' | Summary | Lin 12'; Fang (yellow card) 61'; Xuepeng (yellow card) 69'; Bowen (yellow card) 74'; Wenzhao (yellow card) 78' | Stadium: Hongkou Football Stadium; Attendance: 21,327; Referee: Ma Ning |

| 20 August 2016 23 | Shanghai Greenland Shenhua | 2 – 1 | Liaoning Whowin | Shanghai |
| 19:35 (UTC+08) | Moreno 43'; Sheng (yellow card) 63'; Martins 80' | Summary | Tao (yellow card) 24'; Thwaite 28'; Shilin (yellow card) 73' | Stadium: Hongkou Football Stadium; Attendance: 23,110; Referee: Hei Xiaohu |

| 11 September 2016 24 | Guangzhou R&F | 1 – 1 | Shanghai Greenland Shenhua | Guangzhou |
| 15:30 (UTC+08) | Renatinho 7'; Yang (yellow card) 32' | Summary | Moreno (yellow card) 37' (goal) 49'; Sheng (yellow card) 44'; Fei (yellow card) 86' | Stadium: Yuexiushan Stadium; Attendance: 7,812; Referee: Zhao Zhizhi |

| 16 September 2016 25 | Shanghai Greenland Shenhua | 2 – 2 | Chongqing Lifan | Shanghai |
| 19:35 (UTC+08) | Moreno 22'; Yunding 32'; Sheng (yellow card) 75' | Summary | Wangsong (yellow card) 9'; Jung (yellow card) 45'; Dong 53' (yellow card) 60'; Kardec (yellow card) 74'; Fernandinho 80' | Stadium: Hongkou Football Stadium; Attendance: 21,069; Referee: Li Haixin |

| 25 September 2016 26 | Tianjin TEDA | 1 – 3 | Shanghai Greenland Shenhua | Tianjin |
| 19:35 (UTC+08) | Jiakang 50' | Summary | Jianbin 40'; Zheng 73'; Martins 82' | Stadium: Tianjin Olympic Center Stadium; Attendance: 20,618; Referee: Fan Qi |

| 16 October 2016 27 | Shanghai Greenland Shenhua | 2 – 2 | Henan Jianye | Shanghai |
| 19:35 (UTC+08) | Moreno 14', 60' (pen.); Guarín (yellow card) 51'; Yunding (yellow card) 90+2' | Summary | Patiño 56', 63' (yellow card) 86'; McGowan (yellow card) 59'; Hao (yellow card) 74' | Stadium: Hongkou Football Stadium; Attendance: 23,212; Referee: Huang Yejun |

| 23 October 2016 28 | Hangzhou Greentown | 0 – 0 | Shanghai Greenland Shenhua | Hangzhou |
| 19:35 (UTC+08) | Xiao (yellow card) 8'; Ramon (yellow card) 23'; Yuhao (yellow card) 50' | Summary | Yun (yellow card) 23'; Lin (yellow card) 29'; Di (yellow card) 58'; Yunding (yellow card) 81' | Stadium: Yellow Dragon Sports Center; Attendance: 12,685; Referee: Ai Kun |

| 26 October 2016 29 | Shanghai Greenland Shenhua | 0 – 0 | Beijing Guoan | Shanghai |
| 19:35 (UTC+08) | Jianbin (yellow card) 89' (yellow-red card) 90+2'; Jiajun (yellow card) 90+1' | Summary | Dabao (yellow card) 21'; Krimets (yellow card) 72'; Xiaobin (yellow card) 90+3' | Stadium: Hongkou Football Stadium; Attendance: 23,651; Referee: Lin Jun |

| 30 October 2016 30 | Changchun Yatai | 1 – 0 | Shanghai Greenland Shenhua | Changchun |
| 19:35 (UTC+08) | Matić (yellow card) 34'; Shuai 44'; Ismailov (yellow card) 73'; Guang (yellow card) 84'; Zhe (yellow card) 90+3' | Summary | Kim (yellow card) 49' | Stadium: Development Area Stadium; Referee: Zhao Zhizhi |

==== Table ====
| Pos | Team | Pld | W | D | L | GF | GA | GD | Pts | Qualification or relegation |
|---|---|---|---|---|---|---|---|---|---|---|
| 2 | Jiangsu Suning | 30 | 17 | 6 | 7 | 53 | 33 | +20 | 57 | Qualification to Champions League group stage |
| 3 | Shanghai SIPG | 30 | 14 | 10 | 6 | 56 | 32 | +24 | 52 | Qualification to Champions League play-off round |
| 4 | Shanghai Greenland Shenhua (Note: Shanghai Greenland Shenhua qualified for the 2017 AFC Champions League qualifying play-offs round as Guangzhou Evergrande Taobao and Jiangsu Suning are 2016 Chinese FA Cup finalists.) | 30 | 12 | 12 | 6 | 46 | 31 | +15 | 48 | Qualification to Champions League play-off round |
| 5 | Beijing Guoan | 30 | 11 | 10 | 9 | 34 | 26 | +8 | 43 | |
| 6 | Guangzhou R&F | 30 | 11 | 7 | 12 | 47 | 50 | −3 | 40 | |

Source: Sina Sports
Rules for classification: 1) Points; 2) Head-to-head points; 3) Head-to-head goal difference; 4) Head-to-head goals scored; 5) Reserve league points; 6) Goal difference; 7) Goals scored; 8) Disciplinary points (1 point for each yellow card, 3 points for each red card)

=== Chinese FA Cup ===
| 11 May 2016 Third Round | Shanghai Greenland Shenhua | 5 – 0 | Qingdao Jonoon | Shanghai |
| 20:00 (UTC+8) | Ba 14', 39'; Guarín 50'; Martins 56' (pen.), 72' | Summary | | Stadium: Hongkou Football Stadium (Note: Qingdao Jonoon abdicated to play at their home stadium.); Attendance: 18,253; Referee: Liu Lin |

| 29 June 2016 Fourth Round | Shanghai Greenland Shenhua | 1 – 0 | Shandong Luneng Taishan | Shanghai |
| 19:35 (UTC+8) | Moreno 79' | Summary | | Stadium: Hongkou Football Stadium; Attendance: 19,356; Referee: Wang Zhe |

| 13 July 2016 Fifth Round 1st Leg | Shanghai Greenland Shenhua | 4 – 0 | Tianjin Quanjian | Shanghai |
| 19:35 (UTC+8) | Yunding 12'; Martins 56', 82'; Ba 75' | Summary | | Stadium: Hongkou Football Stadium; Attendance: 17,723; Referee: Wang Jing |

| 27 July 2016 Fifth Round 2nd Leg | Tianjin Quanjian | 0 – 1 (0 – 5 agg.) | Shanghai Greenland Shenhua | Tianjin |
| 19:35 (UTC+8) | | Summary | Di 10' | Stadium: Haihe Educational Football Stadium; Attendance: 4,287; Referee: Gu Chunhan |

| 17 August 2016 Semi-Final 1st Leg | Shanghai Greenland Shenhua | 2 – 3 | Jiangsu Suning | Shanghai |
| 19:35 (UTC+8) | Martins 21', 90+3'; Kaimu (yellow card) 46' (yellow-red card) 90+1' | Summary | Xiang (yellow card) 50'; Teixeira 53', 81'; Xi 55'; Hong (yellow card) 78' | Stadium: Hongkou Football Stadium |

| 21 September 2016 Semi-Final 2nd Leg | Jiangsu Suning | 1 – 0 (4 – 2 agg.) | Shanghai Greenland Shenhua | Nanjing |
| 19:35 (UTC+8) | Xi 77'; Xiaotian (yellow card) 82' | Summary | Wenbo (yellow card) 52'; Yun (yellow card) 74' | Stadium: Nanjing Olympic Sports Centre |

== Squad statistics ==
As of match played 30 October 2016

=== Appearances and goals ===
| No. | Pos | Nat | Player | Total | | Super League | | FA Cup | |
| No. | Pos | Nat | Player | Apps | Goals | Apps | Goals | Apps | Goals |
|---|---|---|---|---|---|---|---|---|---|
| 1 | GK | (China) CHN | Geng Xiaofeng | 5 | 0 | 1+2 | 0 | 2 | 0 |
| 2 | DF | (China) CHN | Xiong Fei | 19 | 0 | 13+2 | 0 | 4 | 0 |
| 3 | DF | (China) CHN | Li Jianbin | 22 | 2 | 19 | 2 | 3 | 0 |
| 4 | DF | (South Korea) KOR | Kim Kee-hee | 32 | 1 | 29 | 1 | 3 | 0 |
| 5 | MF | (China) CHN | Wang Shouting | 12 | 0 | 3+5 | 0 | 2+2 | 0 |
| 6 | DF | (China) CHN | Li Wenbo | 3 | 0 | 0+1 | 0 | 2 | 0 |
| 8 | MF | (China) CHN | Zhang Lu | 26 | 0 | 10+12 | 0 | 3+1 | 0 |
| 9 | FW | (Senegal) SEN | Demba Ba | 21 | 17 | 18 | 14 | 3 | 3 |
| 10 | MF | (Colombia) COL | Giovanni Moreno | 29 | 9 | 25 | 8 | 1+3 | 1 |
| 11 | FW | (China) CHN | Lü Zheng | 27 | 2 | 23+2 | 2 | 1+1 | 0 |
| 13 | MF | (Colombia) COL | Fredy Guarín | 29 | 4 | 25 | 3 | 4 | 1 |
| 16 | DF | (China) CHN | Li Yunqiu | 9 | 0 | 8 | 0 | 1 | 0 |
| 17 | FW | (Nigeria) NGR | Obafemi Martins | 30 | 14 | 12+13 | 8 | 4+1 | 6 |
| 18 | FW | (China) CHN | Gao Di | 16 | 1 | 1+10 | 0 | 2+3 | 1 |
| 19 | DF | (China) CHN | Zheng Kaimu | 6 | 0 | 1+3 | 0 | 1+1 | 0 |
| 20 | MF | (China) CHN | Wang Yun | 26 | 0 | 7+15 | 0 | 4 | 0 |
| 22 | GK | (China) CHN | Qiu Shengjiong | 2 | 0 | 0 | 0 | 2 | 0 |
| 23 | DF | (China) CHN | Bai Jiajun | 29 | 0 | 26 | 0 | 3 | 0 |
| 24 | DF | (China) CHN | Deng Zhuoxiang | 2 | 0 | 0 | 0 | 1+1 | 0 |
| 25 | DF | (China) CHN | Wang Lin | 11 | 0 | 5+1 | 0 | 5 | 0 |
| 26 | MF | (China) CHN | Qin Sheng | 29 | 0 | 26 | 0 | 2+1 | 0 |
| 27 | GK | (China) CHN | Li Shuai | 30 | 0 | 28 | 0 | 2 | 0 |
| 28 | MF | (China) CHN | Cao Yunding | 33 | 5 | 27+1 | 4 | 4+1 | 1 |
| 30 | DF | (China) CHN | Tao Jin | 14 | 0 | 7+4 | 0 | 3 | 0 |
| 32 | FW | (China) CHN | Xu Junmin | 5 | 0 | 0+2 | 0 | 2+1 | 0 |
| 33 | DF | (China) CHN | Bi Jinhao | 8 | 0 | 5+1 | 0 | 2 | 0 |
Players who away from the club on loan:
Players who appeared for Shanghai Greenland Shenhua who left during the season:

=== Goal scorers ===
| Place | Position | Nation | Number | Name | Super League | FA Cup | Total |
|---|---|---|---|---|---|---|---|
| 1 | FW | (Senegal) | 9 | Demba Ba | 14 | 3 | 17 |
| 2 | FW | (Nigeria) | 17 | Obafemi Martins | 8 | 6 | 14 |
| 3 | MF | (Colombia) | 10 | Giovanni Moreno | 8 | 1 | 9 |
| 4 | MF | (China) | 28 | Cao Yunding | 4 | 1 | 5 |
| 5 | MF | (Colombia) | 13 | Fredy Guarín | 3 | 1 | 4 |
| 6 | FW | (China) | 11 | Lü Zheng | 2 | 0 | 2 |
| 6 | DF | (China) | 3 | Li Jianbin | 2 | 0 | 2 |
| 6 | | | | Own goal | 2 | 0 | 2 |
| 9 | MF | (South Korea) | 4 | Kim Kee-hee | 1 | 0 | 1 |
| 9 | FW | (China) | 18 | Gao Di | 0 | 1 | 1 |
| | | | | TOTALS | 44 | 13 | 57 |

=== Disciplinary record ===
| Number | Nation | Position | Name | Super League | | FA Cup | | Total | |
| Number | Nation | Position | Name | Yellow card | Red card | Yellow card | Red card | Yellow card | Red card |
| 2 | (China) | DF | Xiong Fei | 4 | 0 | 0 | 0 | 4 | 0 |
| 3 | (China) | DF | Li Jianbin | 7 | 2 | 0 | 0 | 7 | 2 |
| 4 | (South Korea) | DF | Kim Kee-hee | 4 | 0 | 0 | 0 | 4 | 0 |
| 8 | (China) | MF | Zhang Lu | 1 | 0 | 0 | 0 | 1 | 0 |
| 9 | (Senegal) | FW | Demba Ba | 3 | 0 | 0 | 0 | 3 | 0 |
| 10 | (Colombia) | MF | Giovanni Moreno | 8 | 1 | 0 | 0 | 8 | 1 |
| 11 | (China) | FW | Lü Zheng | 3 | 1 | 0 | 0 | 3 | 1 |
| 13 | (Colombia) | MF | Fredy Guarín | 7 | 0 | 0 | 0 | 7 | 0 |
| 16 | (China) | DF | Li Yunqiu | 2 | 0 | 0 | 0 | 2 | 0 |
| 18 | (China) | FW | Gao Di | 1 | 0 | 0 | 0 | 1 | 0 |
| 20 | (China) | MF | Wang Yun | 2 | 0 | 0 | 0 | 2 | 0 |
| 23 | (China) | DF | Bai Jiajun | 6 | 1 | 0 | 0 | 6 | 1 |
| 25 | (China) | FW | Wang Lin | 1 | 0 | 0 | 0 | 1 | 0 |
| 26 | (China) | MF | Qin Sheng | 10 | 0 | 0 | 0 | 10 | 0 |
| 27 | (China) | GK | Li Shuai | 1 | 0 | 0 | 0 | 1 | 0 |
| 28 | (China) | MF | Cao Yunding | 3 | 0 | 0 | 0 | 3 | 0 |
| 33 | (China) | DF | Bi Jinhao | 1 | 0 | 0 | 0 | 1 | 0 |
| | | | TOTALS | 63 | 5 | 0 | 0 | 63 | 5 |
