= List of Chinese football transfers summer 2016 =

This is a list of Chinese football transfers for the 2016 season summer transfer window. The transfer window opened on 21 June 2016 and closed on 15 July 2016.

== Super League ==
=== Beijing Guoan ===
In:

No.	Pos.	Nation	Player
15	FW	UZB	Igor Sergeev (loan from (Uzbekistan) Pakhtakor Tashkent)
61	DF	CHN	Wang Haitao (from Beijing BG)

Out:

No.	Pos.	Nation	Player
9	FW	BRA	Kléber (to (Portugal) Estoril)
14	DF	CHN	Jin Pengxiang (loan to Tianjin Quanjian)
35	MF	CHN	Li Tixiang (to Shijiazhuang Ever Bright)
49	MF	CHN	Wang Hongyu (loan to Beijing BIT)
54	MF	CHN	Zhong Jiyu (loan to Beijing BIT)
57	MF	CHN	Tang Fan (loan to Beijing BIT)
60	GK	CHN	Zhang Hao (to Shijiazhuang Ever Bright)

=== Changchun Yatai ===
In:

No.	Pos.	Nation	Player
27	MF	CHN	Wang Jinliang (Free Agent)
30	DF	CHN	Yang Boyu (loan from Shanghai SIPG)
35	MF	CRO	Mislav Oršić (from (South Korea) Jeonnam Dragons)
37	FW	BRA	Bruno Meneghel (from (Japan) Cerezo Osaka)

Out:

No.	Pos.	Nation	Player
9	FW	SRB	Ognjen Ožegović (to (Serbia) FK Čukarički)

=== Chongqing Lifan ===
In:

No.	Pos.	Nation	Player
27	FW	BRA	Alan Kardec (from (Brazil) São Paulo FC)

Out:

No.	Pos.	Nation	Player
10	FW	BRA	Jael Ferreira (to (Brazil) Joinville)

=== Guangzhou Evergrande Taobao ===
In:

No.	Pos.	Nation	Player
15	FW	CHN	Zhang Wenzhao (from Shandong Luneng)
56	DF	CHN	Guo Jing (from (Portugal) Oriental Dragon FC)
-	MF	CHN	Wang Junhui (loan return from Shijiazhuang Ever Bright)
-	MF	ITA	Alessandro Diamanti (loan return from (Italy) Atalanta)

Out:

No.	Pos.	Nation	Player
18	MF	CHN	Li Yuanyi (loan to Tianjin Teda)
24	FW	CHN	Liang Xueming (loan to Guizhou Zhicheng)
39	FW	CHN	Wang Jingbin (loan to (Japan) Fagiano Okayama)
44	DF	CHN	Liu Hao (loan to Guizhou Zhicheng)
46	DF	CHN	Yang Zhaohui (to (Portugal) F.C. Vizela)
55	DF	CHN	Hu Bowen (loan to Shenyang Urban)
60	MF	CHN	Zhang Jiaqi (loan to Qingdao Huanghai)
-	MF	CHN	Wang Junhui (loan to Wuhan Zall)
-	MF	ITA	Alessandro Diamanti (to (Italy) Palermo)

=== Guangzhou R&F ===
In:

No.	Pos.	Nation	Player
19	GK	CHN	Han Feng (from Henan Jianye)
25	FW	ISR	Eran Zahavi (from (Israel) Maccabi Tel Aviv)
62	FW	CHN	Mai Jiajian (loan from Shanghai Shenxin)
-	FW	NGA	Aaron Samuel Olanare (loan return from (Russia) CSKA Moscow)
-	MF	ESP	Michel Herrero (loan return from (Spain) Real Oviedo)
-	FW	COD	Jeremy Bokila (loan return from (Turkey) Eskişehirspor)

Out:

No.	Pos.	Nation	Player
6	DF	CHN	Yang Ting (loan to Hong Kong R&F)
10	FW	BRA	Bruninho (loan to (Denmark) FC Midtjylland)
26	DF	CHN	Xiang Jiachi (loan to Hong Kong R&F)
27	MF	CHN	Hou Junjie (loan to Hong Kong R&F)
35	FW	CHN	Min Junlin (loan to Hong Kong R&F)
37	MF	CHN	Li Yuyang (loan to Hong Kong R&F)
41	GK	CHN	Xing Yu (loan to Hong Kong R&F)
42	DF	CHN	Li Lei (loan to Hong Kong R&F)
44	DF	CHN	Ye Ruiwen (loan to Hong Kong R&F)
45	DF	CHN	Liang Zhanhao (loan to Hong Kong R&F)
48	FW	CHN	Chen Jiaqi (loan to Hong Kong R&F)
56	DF	CHN	Wei Zongren (loan to Hong Kong R&F)
57	MF	CHN	Xiang Wenjun (loan to Hong Kong R&F)
63	DF	CHN	Ma Weichao (loan to Hong Kong R&F)
70	DF	CHN	Bi Guanghuan (loan to Hong Kong R&F)
73	GK	CHN	Long Wenhao (loan to Hong Kong R&F)
74	MF	CHN	He Zilin (loan to Hong Kong R&F)
-	MF	ESP	Michel Herrero (to (Spain) Real Valladolid)
-	FW	COD	Jeremy Bokila (loan to (Qatar) Al Kharaitiyat SC)

=== Hangzhou Greentown ===
In:

No.	Pos.	Nation	Player
22	MF	CHN	Cheng Jin (loan return from Wuhan Zall)
30	MF	CRO	Sammir (loan from Jiangsu Suning)

Out:

No.	Pos.	Nation	Player
2	DF	CHN	Yue Xin (loan to (Denmark) Vejle BK)
17	FW	AUS	Tim Cahill (to (Australia) Melbourne City)
20	FW	CIV	Davy Claude Angan (loan to (Turkey) Gaziantepspor)

=== Hebei China Fortune ===
In:

No.	Pos.	Nation	Player
31	FW	BRA	Aloísio (from Shandong Luneng)

Out:

No.	Pos.	Nation	Player
55	MF	CHN	Xu Jiajun (loan to Shenyang Urban)

=== Henan Jianye ===
In:

No.	Pos.	Nation	Player
7	DF	SVN	Miral Samardžić (from (Croatia) HNK Rijeka)
22	DF	CHN	Long Wei (Free Agent)
29	FW	CHN	Han Jiabao (from Dalian Transcendence)

Out:

No.	Pos.	Nation	Player
41	GK	CHN	Han Feng (to Guangzhou R&F)

=== Jiangsu Suning ===
In:

No.	Pos.	Nation	Player
26	DF	KOR	Hong Jeong-ho (from (Germany) FC Augsburg)
38	FW	COL	Roger Martínez (from (Colombia) Racing Club)
50	DF	CHN	Zhong Yi (loan from (Portugal) Atlético CP)
59	DF	CHN	Yang Ailong (loan from (Portugal) Oriental Dragon)
61	DF	CHN	Liu Junshuai (loan from (Portugal) Torreense)
62	MF	CHN	Gong Haolun (Free Agent)

Out:

No.	Pos.	Nation	Player
14	FW	CHN	Qu Cheng (loan to Sichuan Longfor)
16	MF	CRO	Sammir (loan to Hangzhou Greentown)
18	FW	CHN	Zhang Wei (loan to Chengdu Qbao)
42	DF	CHN	Li Shizhou (loan to Shenyang Urban)

=== Liaoning FC ===
In:

No.	Pos.	Nation	Player
13	MF	AUS	Dario Vidošić (from (Australia) Western Sydney Wanderers)
37	FW	NGA	Anthony Ujah (from (Germany) Werder Bremen)

Out:

No.	Pos.	Nation	Player
10	MF	AUS	James Troisi (to (Australia) Melbourne Victory)
-	GK	CHN	Huang Hongbo (loan to Shenyang Urban)

=== Shandong Luneng Taishan ===
In:

No.	Pos.	Nation	Player
7	FW	ITA	Graziano Pellè (from (England) Southampton F.C.)
18	FW	SEN	Papiss Cissé (from (England) Newcastle United)
31	MF	CHN	Song Long (from Qingdao Jonoon)
32	DF	CHN	Liu Yang (loan return from (Portugal) Oriental Dragon FC)
34	DF	CHN	Li Hailong (loan return from (Portugal) SG Sacavenense)
36	DF	CHN	Yao Junsheng (loan return from (Portugal) Real Sport Clube)
38	MF	CHN	Chen Kerui (loan return from (Portugal) CD Pinhalnovense)
59	MF	CHN	Cao Sheng (loan return from (Portugal) S.C.U. Torreense)
60	MF	CHN	Zhang Chen (loan return from (Portugal) CD Pinhalnovense)

Out:

No.	Pos.	Nation	Player
29	FW	CHN	Zhang Wenzhao (to Guangzhou Evergrande)
21	FW	BRA	Aloísio (to Hebei China Fortune)

=== Shanghai Greenland Shenhua ===
In:

No.	Pos.	Nation	Player
62	FW	CHN	Chen Xiaomao (loan return from (Spain) Atlético Museros)
63	MF	CHN	Liao Zhilüe (loan return from (Spain) CF Crack's)
64	DF	CHN	Gong Jinshuai (loan return from (Spain) Atlético Museros)
65	MF	CHN	Yan Xinyu (loan return from (Spain) Atlético Museros)
66	MF	CHN	Chen Qiyuan (loan return from (Spain) Atlético Museros)
67	MF	CHN	Zhang Yuhao (loan return from (Spain) CF Crack's)
68	MF	CHN	Cui Qi (loan return from (Spain) Atlético Museros)
69	MF	CHN	Zu Pengchao (loan return from (Spain) Atlético Museros)
-	GK	CHN	Bai Shuo (loan return from (Spain) Atlético Museros)
-	DF	CHN	Deng Biao (loan return from (Spain) Atlético Museros)
-	MF	CHN	Yang Haofeng (loan return from (Spain) Atlético Museros)
-	MF	CHN	Li Lianxiang (loan return from (Spain) CF Crack's)
-	MF	CHN	Lü Pin (loan return from (Spain) Atlético Museros)
-	MF	CHN	Liu Jiawei (loan return from (Spain) Atlético Museros)
-	FW	CHN	Wu Changqi (loan return from (Spain) Atlético Museros)
-	FW	CHN	Zhou Jiahao (loan return from (Spain) Atlético Museros)
-	DF	HKG	Brian Fok (loan return from (Romania) ACS Berceni)
-	DF	ZAM	Stoppila Sunzu (loan return from (France) Lille OSC)
-	GK	CHN	Zhu Yueqi (loan return from (Spain) Atlético Museros)
-	MF	CHN	Su Shun (loan return from (Spain) Atlético Museros)

Out:

No.	Pos.	Nation	Player
-	GK	CHN	Bai Shuo (loan to Shanghai JuJu Sports)
-	DF	CHN	Deng Biao (loan to (Spain) Atlético Saguntino)
-	MF	CHN	Yang Haofeng (loan to Shanghai JuJu Sports)
-	MF	CHN	Li Lianxiang (loan to Shanghai JuJu Sports)
-	MF	CHN	Lü Pin (loan to (Spain) Atlético Saguntino)
-	MF	CHN	Liu Jiawei (loan to (Spain) La Roda)
-	FW	CHN	Wu Changqi (loan to (Spain) La Roda)
-	FW	CHN	Zhou Jiahao (loan to (Spain) Eldense)
-	DF	HKG	Brian Fok (loan to (Azerbaijan) AZAL PFK)
-	DF	ZAM	Stoppila Sunzu (to (France) Lille OSC)
-	FW	BRA	Paulo Henrique (loan to (Portugal) Estoril)

=== Shanghai SIPG ===
In:

No.	Pos.	Nation	Player
8	FW	BRA	Hulk (from (Russia) Zenit Saint Petersburg)
-	MF	CHN	Liu Xiangcheng (loan return from Shanghai JuJu Sports)

Out:

No.	Pos.	Nation	Player
3	FW	GHA	Asamoah Gyan (loan to (United Arab Emirates) Al-Ahli)
13	FW	CHN	Zhu Zhengrong (loan to Meizhou Kejia)
25	MF	CHN	Zhu Zhengyu (loan to (Serbia) BSK Borča)
33	DF	CHN	Yang Boyu (loan to Changchun Yatai)
58	FW	CHN	Mao Jiakang (to Nantong Zhiyun)

=== Shijiazhuang Ever Bright ===
In:

No.	Pos.	Nation	Player
16	FW	FRA	Jean-Philippe Mendy (from (Slovenia) NK Maribor)
30	FW	BRA	Diego Maurício (from (Brazil) Bragantino)
33	FW	BRA	Matheus (from (Ukraine) Dnipro Dnipropetrovsk)
35	MF	CHN	Li Tixiang (from Beijing Guoan)
54	DF	CHN	An Shuo (from (Portugal) Oliveira do Hospital)
55	GK	CHN	Zhang Hao (from Beijing Guoan)

Out:

No.	Pos.	Nation	Player
27	MF	CHN	Wang Junhui (loan return to Guangzhou Evergrande)
30	FW	BRA	Diego Maurício (loan return to (Brazil) Bragantino)
41	MF	CHN	Shen Hao (to Suzhou Dongwu)

=== Tianjin Teda ===
In:

No.	Pos.	Nation	Player
18	FW	GAB	Malick Evouna (from (Egypt) Al Ahly SC)
31	MF	CHN	Li Yuanyi (loan from Guangzhou Evergrande Taobao)
-	FW	COL	Wilmar Jordán (loan return from (United Arab Emirates) Emirates Club)

Out:

No.	Pos.	Nation	Player
36	MF	CHN	Wang Xinxin (Retired)
57	FW	CHN	Fan Zhiqiang (loan to Jiangxi Liansheng)
-	FW	COL	Wilmar Jordán (to (Bulgaria) CSKA Sofia)

=== Yanbian Funde ===
In:

No.	Pos.	Nation	Player

Out:

No.	Pos.	Nation	Player

== League One ==
=== Beijing BG ===
In:

No.	Pos.	Nation	Player
10	FW	AUT	Rubin Okotie (from (Germany) 1860 Munich)
29	MF	CHN	Han Yi (Free Agent)
60	DF	CHN	Wang Junming (Free Agent)

Out:

No.	Pos.	Nation	Player
59	DF	CHN	Wang Haitao (to Beijing Guoan)

=== Beijing Renhe ===
In:

No.	Pos.	Nation	Player
11	FW	SWE	Guillermo Molins (loan to Shenyang Urban)

Out:

No.	Pos.	Nation	Player
41	FW	CHN	Wu Dingmao (loan to Shenyang Urban)
47	MF	CHN	Sun Weizhe (loan to (Belgium) K.S.V. Roeselare)
58	MF	CHN	Li Chenglong (loan to (Belgium) K.S.V. Roeselare)

=== Dalian Transcendence ===
In:

No.	Pos.	Nation	Player
19	FW	BRA	William (from (Brazil) Joinville)
45	DF	CHN	Zhang Xiaolong (Free Agent)
46	DF	CHN	Qu Jiachen (Free Agent)

Out:

No.	Pos.	Nation	Player
9	FW	CHN	Han Jiabao (to Henan Jianye)

=== Dalian Yifang ===
In:

No.	Pos.	Nation	Player
22	FW	LBR	Sekou Oliseh (from (Romania) Astra Giurgiu)

Out:

No.	Pos.	Nation	Player
10	MF	ROU	Constantin Budescu (loan to (Romania) Astra Giurgiu)
48	MF	CHN	Wang Tianci (to Zhejiang Yiteng)

=== Guizhou Hengfeng Zhicheng ===
In:

No.	Pos.	Nation	Player
22	FW	CHN	Liang Xueming (loan from Guangzhou Evergrande Taobao)
26	DF	CHN	Liu Hao (loan from Guangzhou Evergrande Taobao)
55	MF	CHN	Liu Bin (from Tianjin Quanjian)

Out:

No.	Pos.	Nation	Player

=== Hunan Billows ===
In:

No.	Pos.	Nation	Player
14	FW	ISR	Toto Tamuz (Free Agent)

Out:

No.	Pos.	Nation	Player
47	MF	CHN	Zhong Haoran (to (Serbia) Spartak Subotica)

=== Meizhou Kejia ===
In:

No.	Pos.	Nation	Player
31	MF	CHN	Tang Shi (from (Portugal) Gondomar S.C.)
35	FW	CHN	Zhu Zhengrong (loan from Shanghai SIPG)
44	MF	CHN	Huang Zhengyan (Free Agent)

Out:

No.	Pos.	Nation	Player
31	MF	CHN	Tang Shi (to (Portugal) FC Paços de Ferreira)

=== Nei Mongol Zhongyou ===
In:

No.	Pos.	Nation	Player
15	FW	SEN	André Senghor (Free Agent)

Out:

No.	Pos.	Nation	Player
41	FW	CHN	Wang Yida (to Heilongjiang Lava Spring)

=== Qingdao Huanghai ===
In:

No.	Pos.	Nation	Player
18	MF	CHN	Zhang Jiaqi (loan from Guangzhou Evergrande)

Out:

No.	Pos.	Nation	Player

=== Qingdao Jonoon ===
In:

No.	Pos.	Nation	Player

Out:

No.	Pos.	Nation	Player
23	MF	CHN	Song Long (to Shandong Luneng)

=== Shanghai Shenxin ===
In:

No.	Pos.	Nation	Player
30	MF	BRA	Davi (Free Agent)

Out:

No.	Pos.	Nation	Player
14	MF	SRB	Nikola Mitrović (to (Israel) Bnei Yehuda)
25	FW	CHN	Mai Jiajian (loan to Guangzhou R&F)
43	DF	CHN	Mao Shiming (loan to Hainan Boying & Seamen)

=== Shenzhen F.C. ===
In:

No.	Pos.	Nation	Player
4	DF	CHN	Qiao Wei (Free Agent)
9	FW	JAM	Deshorn Brown (from (Norway) Vålerenga Fotball)
30	MF	CHN	Wang Chengkuai (from (Portugal) Gondomar S.C.)

Out:

No.	Pos.	Nation	Player
28	FW	CHN	Yu Shuai (to Hebei Elite)

=== Tianjin Quanjian ===
In:

No.	Pos.	Nation	Player
15	DF	CHN	Jin Pengxiang (loan from Beijing Guoan)
-	FW	ENG	Frank Nouble (loan return from Nei Mongol Zhongyou)

Out:

No.	Pos.	Nation	Player
44	MF	CHN	Liu Bin (to Guizhou Zhicheng)
-	FW	ENG	Frank Nouble (to (England) Gillingham F.C.)

=== Wuhan Zall ===
In:

No.	Pos.	Nation	Player
30	FW	LBR	Sam Johnson (from (Sweden) Djurgårdens IF)
34	MF	CHN	Wang Junhui (loan from Guangzhou Evergrande)

Out:

No.	Pos.	Nation	Player
10	MF	CHN	Cheng Jin (loan return to Hangzhou Greentown)

=== Xinjiang Tianshan Leopard ===
In:

No.	Pos.	Nation	Player

Out:

No.	Pos.	Nation	Player

=== Zhejiang Yiteng ===
In:

No.	Pos.	Nation	Player
43	MF	CHN	Wang Tianci (from Dalian Yifang)

Out:

No.	Pos.	Nation	Player
15	MF	CHN	Wu Chen (loan to Hainan Boying & Seamen)
22	MF	CHN	Zhao Wei (to Shenzhen Renren)

== League Two ==
=== North League ===
==== Baoding Yingli ETS ====
In:

No.	Pos.	Nation	Player
30	GK	CHN	Zhao Bo (Free Agent)

Out:

No.	Pos.	Nation	Player

==== Baotou Nanjiao ====
In:

No.	Pos.	Nation	Player
27	GK	CHN	Di Chaofeng (Free Agent)

Out:

No.	Pos.	Nation	Player

==== Beijing BIT ====
In:

No.	Pos.	Nation	Player
20	MF	CHN	Tang Fan (loan from Beijing Guoan)
39	MF	CHN	Zhong Jiyu (loan from Beijing Guoan)
40	MF	CHN	Wang Hongyu (loan from Beijing Guoan)

Out:

No.	Pos.	Nation	Player

==== Hebei Elite ====
In:

No.	Pos.	Nation	Player
25	DF	CHN	Ma Sheng (loan return from (Brazil) Botafogo (SP))
30	FW	CHN	Yu Shuai (from Shenzhen F.C.)

Out:

No.	Pos.	Nation	Player

==== Heilongjiang Lava Spring ====
In:

No.	Pos.	Nation	Player
26	FW	CHN	Wang Yida (from Nei Mongol Zhongyou)

Out:

No.	Pos.	Nation	Player

==== Jiangsu Yancheng Dingli ====
In:

No.	Pos.	Nation	Player

Out:

No.	Pos.	Nation	Player

==== Shenyang Dongjin ====
In:

No.	Pos.	Nation	Player
32	MF	CHN	Chen-Zeng Tailang (Free Agent)

Out:

No.	Pos.	Nation	Player
13	DF	CHN	Wang Meng (to Suzhou Dongwu)

==== Shenyang Urban ====
In:

No.	Pos.	Nation	Player
5	DF	CHN	Hu Bowen (loan from Guangzhou Evergrande)
13	DF	CHN	Li Shizhou (loan from Jiangsu Suning)
23	MF	CHN	Xu Jiajun (loan from Hebei China Fortune)
28	GK	CHN	Huang Hongbo (loan from Liaoning Whowin)
30	FW	CHN	Wu Dingmao (loan from Beijing Renhe)
32	DF	CHN	Sun Gang (Free Agent)

Out:

No.	Pos.	Nation	Player
33	GK	CHN	Liang Yunfeng (to Jiangxi Liansheng)

==== Tianjin Huochetou ====
In:

No.	Pos.	Nation	Player
33	MF	CHN	Zheng Haiping (Free Agent)

Out:

No.	Pos.	Nation	Player

==== Yinchuan Helanshan ====
In:

No.	Pos.	Nation	Player
9	MF	CHN	Wang Guanyu (Free Agent)

Out:

No.	Pos.	Nation	Player

=== South League ===
==== Chengdu Qbao ====
In:

No.	Pos.	Nation	Player
30	FW	CHN	Zhang Wei (loan from Jiangsu Suning)

Out:

No.	Pos.	Nation	Player

==== Hainan Boying & Seamen ====
In:

No.	Pos.	Nation	Player
12	DF	CHN	Mao Shiming (loan from Shanghai Shenxin)
19	MF	CHN	Wu Chen (loan from Zhejiang Yiteng)
28	DF	CHN	Zhou Shichao (Free Agent)

Out:

No.	Pos.	Nation	Player
29	FW	CHN	Yang Chen (to Meizhou Meixian Hakka)

==== Jiangxi Liansheng ====
In:

No.	Pos.	Nation	Player
27	FW	CHN	Fan Zhiqiang (loan from Tianjin Teda)
36	GK	CHN	Liang Yunfeng (from Shenyang Urban)

Out:

No.	Pos.	Nation	Player

==== Lijiang Jiayunhao ====
In:

No.	Pos.	Nation	Player
32	DF	CHN	Dai Yuhan (Free Agent)

Out:

No.	Pos.	Nation	Player

==== Meizhou Meixian Hakka ====
In:

No.	Pos.	Nation	Player
16	FW	CHN	Yang Chen (from Hainan Boying & Seamen)

Out:

No.	Pos.	Nation	Player

==== Nantong Zhiyun ====
In:

No.	Pos.	Nation	Player
12	FW	CHN	Mao Jiakang (from Shanghai SIPG)
29	MF	CHN	Wu Peng (Free Agent)

Out:

No.	Pos.	Nation	Player

==== Shanghai JuJu Sports ====
In:

No.	Pos.	Nation	Player
1	GK	CHN	Bai Shuo (loan from Shanghai Shenhua)
9	MF	CHN	Li Lianxiang (loan from Shanghai Shenhua)
25	MF	CHN	Yang Haofeng (loan from Shanghai Shenhua)

Out:

No.	Pos.	Nation	Player
22	MF	CHN	Liu Xiangcheng (loan return to Shanghai SIPG)

==== Shenzhen Renren ====
In:

No.	Pos.	Nation	Player
2	MF	CHN	Ma Xiaolei (Free Agent)
24	DF	CHN	Zhou Qiang (Free Agent)
28	MF	CHN	Zhao Wei (from Zhejiang Yiteng)

Out:

No.	Pos.	Nation	Player

==== Sichuan Longfor ====
In:

No.	Pos.	Nation	Player
10	MF	CHN	Chen Tao (Free Agent)
17	FW	CHN	Qu Cheng (loan from Jiangsu Suning)

Out:

No.	Pos.	Nation	Player

==== Suzhou Dongwu ====
In:

No.	Pos.	Nation	Player
31	FW	CHN	Liu Feng (Free Agent)
32	DF	CHN	Wang Meng (from Shenyang Dongjin)
40	MF	CHN	Shen Hao (from Shijiazhuang Ever Bright)

Out:

No.	Pos.	Nation	Player
