= Wang Shouting =

Wang Shouting may refer to:

- Wang Shouting (footballer)
- Wang Shouting (politician)
