= Ciprian Cezar Tudorascu =

Romanian-Italian football coach (born 1979)

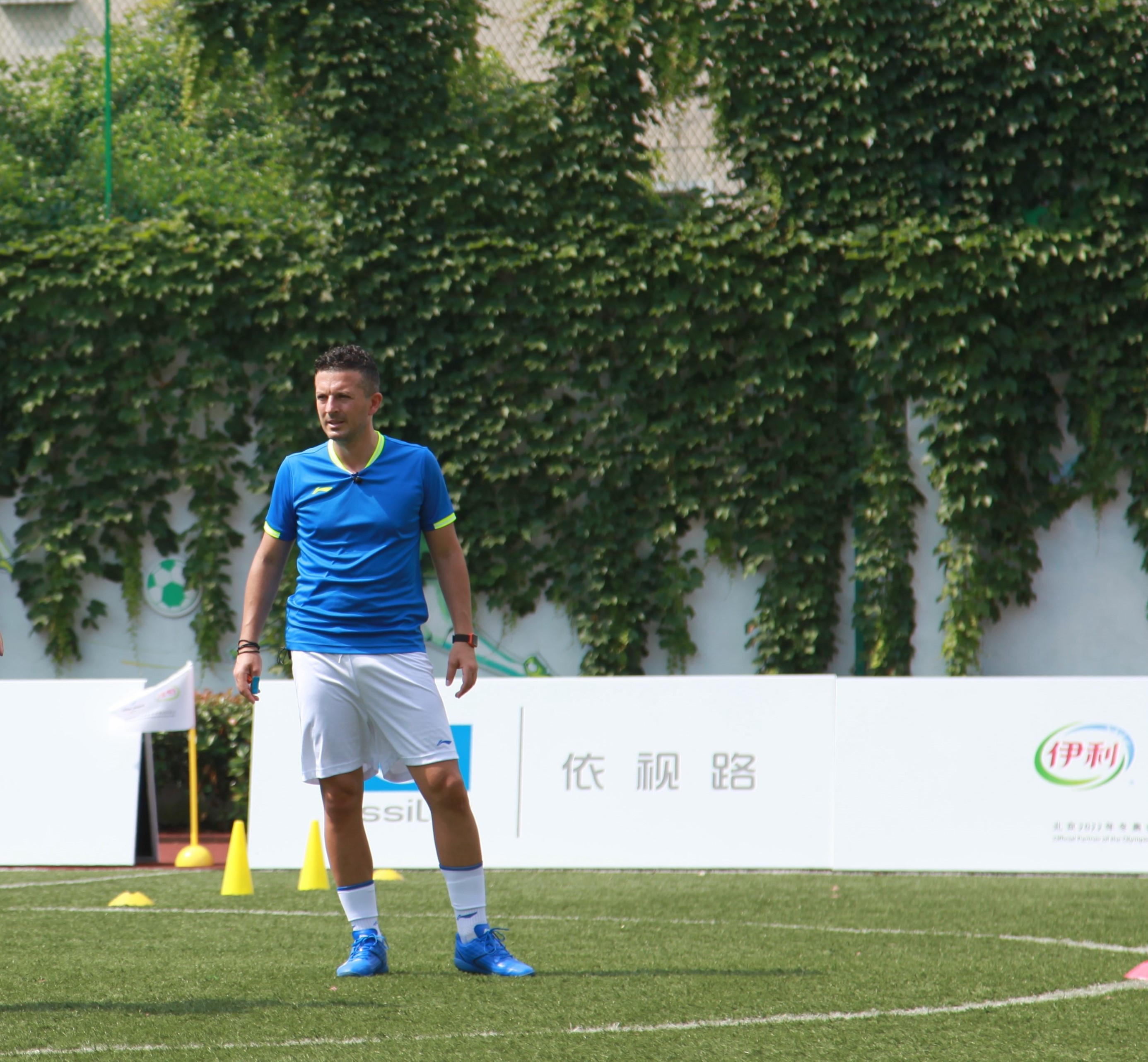
- Ciprian Cezar Tudorascu in Shanghai

Personal information
- Date of birth: 17 August 1979 (age 47)
- Place of birth: Timișoara, Romania
- Height: 1.76 m (5 ft 9 in)
- Position: Midfielder

Youth career
- 1988–1994: FC Politehnica Timișoara
- 1994–1995: FC CFR Timișoara
- 1995–1997: FC Politehnica Timișoara

Senior career*
| Years | Team | Apps | (Gls) |
| 1997–1999 | ASU Politehnica Timișoara | 35 | (12) |

Managerial career
- 2000–2005: Srbijanka Giuchici Academy Timișoara
- 2005–2009: Pordenone Calcio
- 2009–2013: FC Politehnica Timișoara
- 2012–2013: VfB Stuttgart II
- 2013–2017: Atalanta B.C. Youth Sector
- 2017-2020: Shanghai JuJu Sports F.C.
- 2021-2025: Winners Football Club
- 2025-: Bahrain Bayan School
- * Club domestic league appearances and goals

Ciprian Cezar Tudorascu (born 17 August 1979) is a Romanian-Italian football coach and former footballer. He is currently the Physical Education Teacher and Football Coach of Bahrain Bayan School in Bahrain. He has worked in youth and senior football development across Europe, Asia, and the Middle East for over two decades.

== Playing career ==
Tudorascu began his football career in the youth academy of FC Politehnica Timișoara, where he trained from 1988 to 1998. He later played as a midfielder for the club's senior team in Romania's third division from 1998 to 2000.

== Coaching career ==
=== Early coaching ===
Tudorascu began his coaching career in 2000 with FC Srbianka Timișoara, where he worked with the youth teams until 2005. He then moved to Italy, where he coached U12 and U15 teams at Pordenone Calcio Fiume Bannia between 2005 and 2009.

From 2009 to 2011, he was the U15 head coach at FC Politehnica Timișoara in Romania.

In 2013, he joined Atalanta B.C. Academy (Katane Soccer) in southern Italy, serving as Head of the Foundation Phase and coaching youth squads, including the U17 and U12 teams. He remained with the club until 2017, contributing to its youth development framework.

=== Roles in Asia and the Middle East ===
Between 2017 and 2020, Tudorascu worked at Shanghai JuJu Sports F.C. in China, where he was the Technical Director and Head Coach for boys' and girls' youth teams. He also lectured on youth sports development at universities in Shanghai, including Shanghai Jiao Tong University, contributing to the development of football curricula for local schools and the Chinese Football Association. His contract was suspended in 2020 due to the COVID-19 pandemic.

In 2021, he joined the Winners Football Club in Bahrain as an Academy Manager, where he developed a player development model for players aged 6 to 18 years old. He also coordinated football programs in partnership with local educational institutions, including the American School of Bahrain, American University of Bahrain and Ibn Khuldoon National School.

In 2023, he was appointed Technical Director and Head Coach of the first team at Winners FC in Saudi Arabia. Under his leadership, the club competed in the Saudi Arabian Football Federation (4th division), finishing third in its inaugural season.

== Notable players coached ==
Ciprian Cezar Tudorascu has worked with youth players who have progressed to professional clubs and national teams in Romania, Italy, the United States, Malta, Belgium, China, and Turkey. These include:

- Romario Benzar – US Lecce

== Education and qualifications ==
Tudorascu earned a Bachelor's Degree earned a Bachelor's Degree in Sports Sciences from the West University of Timișoara in 2004. He holds a UEFA A coaching licence (since 2007), obtained through training programs in Romania and Italy.
