= Xu Jun (footballer) =

Chinese footballer

Xu Jun 徐君
Personal information
- Full name: Xu Jun
- Date of birth: 29 May 1995 (age 31)
- Place of birth: Yangzhou, Jiangsu, China
- Height: 1.75 m (5 ft 9 in)
- Position: Midfielder

Youth career
- 2006–2008: Tianjin Huochetou
- 2008–2013: Jiangsu Youth
- 2013: Shanghai Luckystar
- 2014–2015: Shanghai Shenhua

Senior career*
Years	Team	Apps	(Gls)
2012	Jiangsu HHU	1	(0)
2015–2020	Shanghai Shenhua	1	(0)
2015	→ CF Crack's (loan)	15	(0)
2017	→ Shanghai JuJu Sports (loan)	21	(4)
2020–2021	Meizhou Hakka	0	(0)
2021	Yichun Grand Tiger	20	(3)
- * Club domestic league appearances and goals as of 31 December 2022

Xu Jun (Chinese: 徐君; born 29 May 1995) is a Chinese footballer who currently plays as a midfielder.

== Club career ==
Xu Jun started his professional football career in 2012 when he joined Jiangsu HHU for the 2012 China League Two campaign. Failing to join Jiangsu Sainty, he moved to another Chinese Super League club Shanghai Shenhua in July 2015. On 25 October 2015, he made his debut for Shenhua in the 2015 Chinese Super League against Liaoning Whowin, coming on as a substitute for Wang Yun in the 67th minute.

== Career statistics ==
Statistics accurate as of match played 31 December 2022.

Appearances and goals by club, season and competition
Club	Season	League			National Cup		Continental		Other		Total	
Club	Season	Division	Apps	Goals	Apps	Goals	Apps	Goals	Apps	Goals	Apps	Goals
Jiangsu HHU	2012	China League Two	1	0	-		-		-		1	0
Shanghai Shenhua	2015	Chinese Super League	1	0	0	0	-		-		1	0
Shanghai Shenhua	2016	Chinese Super League	0	0	0	0	-		-		0	0
Shanghai Shenhua	Total		1	0	0	0	0	0	0	0	1	0
CF Crack's (loan)	2014−15	Primera Regional (Valencia)	15	0	-		-		-		15	0
Shanghai JuJu Sports (loan)	2017	China League Two	21	4	1	0	-		-		22	4
Meizhou Hakka	2020	China League One	0	0	0	0	-		-		0	0
Yichun Grand Tiger	2021	China League Two	20	3	0	0	-		-		20	3
Career total			58	7	1	0	0	0	0	0	59	7
