= Deng Biao =

Chinese association football player

Personal information
- Date of birth: 12 August 1995 (age 31)
- Place of birth: Lu'an, Anhui, China
- Height: 1.85 m (6 ft 1 in)
- Position: Central defender

Team information
- Current team: Guangdong GZ-Power
- Number: 15

Youth career
- –2015: Shanghai Shenhua
- 2015: → CF Cracks (youth loan)

Senior career*
Years	Team	Apps	(Gls)
2015–2019	Shanghai Shenhua	0	(0)
2015–2016	→ Atlético Museros (loan)	29	(0)
2016	→ Atlético Saguntino (loan)	0	(0)
2016–2017	→ Olímpic Xàtiva (loan)	6	(0)
2017	→ Shanghai JuJu Sports (loan)	20	(1)
2018	→ Xinjiang Tianshan Leopard (loan)	17	(0)
2019–2022	Shaanxi Chang'an Athletic	24	(0)
2023	Nanjing City	7	(0)
2024	Shenzhen Peng City	0	(0)
2024	Liaoning Tieren	8	(0)
2025–	Guangdong GZ-Power	22	(1)
- * Club domestic league appearances and goals as of 14:01, 1 January 2026 (UTC)

Deng Biao (Chinese: 邓彪; born 12 August 1995) is a Chinese footballer currently playing as a central defender for Guangdong GZ-Power.

== Career statistics ==
=== Club ===
As of 1 January 2026.

Club	Season	League			Cup		Continental		Other		Total	
Club	Season	Division	Apps	Goals	Apps	Goals	Apps	Goals	Apps	Goals	Apps	Goals
Shanghai Shenhua	2015	Chinese Super League	0	0	0	0	–		0	0	0	0
Shanghai Shenhua	2016	Chinese Super League	0	0	0	0	–		0	0	0	0
Shanghai Shenhua	2017	Chinese Super League	0	0	0	0	–		0	0	0	0
Shanghai Shenhua	2018	Chinese Super League	0	0	0	0	–		0	0	0	0
Shanghai Shenhua	2019	Chinese Super League	0	0	0	0	–		0	0	0	0
Shanghai Shenhua	Total		0	0	0	0	0	0	0	0	0	0
Atlético Museros (loan)	2015–16	Regional Preferente Valenciana	29	0	0	0	–		0	0	29	0
Atlético Saguntino (loan)	2016–17	Segunda División B	0	0	0	0	–		0	0	0	0
Olímpic Xàtiva (loan)	2016–17	Tercera División	6	0	0	0	–		0	0	6	0
Shanghai JuJu Sports (loan)	2017	China League Two	20	1	0	0	–		1 (Note: Appearances in the China League Two playoffs)	0	21	1
Xinjiang Tianshan Leopard (loan)	2018	China League One	17	0	0	0	–		0	0	17	0
Shaanxi Chang'an Athletic	2020	China League One	13	0	0	0	–		0	0	13	0
Shaanxi Chang'an Athletic	2021	China League One	29	0	2	0	–		0	0	31	0
Shaanxi Chang'an Athletic	2022	China League One	25	2	0	0	–		0	0	25	2
Shaanxi Chang'an Athletic	Total		67	2	2	0	0	0	0	0	69	2
Nanjing City	2023	China League One	7	0	2	0	–		0	0	9	0
Shenzhen Peng City	2024	Chinese Super League	0	0	0	0	–		0	0	0	0
Liaoning Tieren	2024	China League One	13	0	0	0	–		0	0	13	0
Guangdong GZ-Power	2025	China League One	22	1	1	0	–		0	0	23	1
Career total			181	4	5	0	0	0	1	0	187	4

== Honours ==
=== Club ===
Guangdong GZ-Power

- China League One: 2026
