= Zhou Jiahao =

Chinese association football player

Personal information
- Date of birth: 16 September 1995 (age 31)
- Place of birth: Lishui, Zhejiang, China
- Height: 1.86 m (6 ft 1 in)
- Position: Forward

Team information
- Current team: Nanjing City
- Number: 5

Youth career
- –2015: Shanghai Shenhua
- 2014–2015: → Zapillo Atlético (youth loan)

Senior career*
Years	Team	Apps	(Gls)
2015–2017	Shanghai Shenhua	0	(0)
2015–2016	→ Atlético Museros (loan)	25	(2)
2016	→ Eldense (loan)	10	(0)
2017	→ Shanghai JuJu Sports (loan)	16	(1)
2018–2020	Shijiazhuang Ever Bright	20	(1)
2020–2021	Zibo Cuju	9	(1)
2021–	Nanjing City	9	(1)
- * Club domestic league appearances and goals as of 14:01, 22 February 2022 (UTC)

Zhou Jiahao (Chinese: 周佳豪; born 16 September 1995) is a Chinese footballer currently playing as a forward for Nanjing City.

== Career statistics ==
=== Club ===
As of 22 February 2022.

Club	Season	League			Cup		Continental		Other		Total	
Club	Season	Division	Apps	Goals	Apps	Goals	Apps	Goals	Apps	Goals	Apps	Goals
Shanghai Shenhua	2015	Chinese Super League	0	0	0	0	0	0	0	0	0	0
Shanghai Shenhua	2016	Chinese Super League	0	0	0	0	0	0	0	0	0	0
Shanghai Shenhua	2017	Chinese Super League	0	0	0	0	0	0	0	0	0	0
Shanghai Shenhua	Total		0	0	0	0	0	0	0	0	0	0
Atlético Museros (loan)	2015–16	Preferente Valenciana	25	2	0	0	–		0	0	25	2
Eldense (loan)	2016–17	Segunda División B	10	0	0	0	–		0	0	10	0
Shanghai JuJu Sports (loan)	2017	China League Two	16	1	0	0	–		1 (Note: Appearances in the China League Two playoffs)	0	17	1
Shijiazhuang Ever Bright	2018	China League One	5	0	0	0	–		0	0	5	0
Shijiazhuang Ever Bright	2019	China League One	15	1	2 (Note: Appearances in the Chinese FA Cup)	0	–		0	0	17	1
Shijiazhuang Ever Bright	2020	Chinese Super League	0	0	0	0	–		0	0	0	0
Shijiazhuang Ever Bright	Total		20	1	2	0	0	0	0	0	22	1
Zibo Cuju	2020	China League Two	9	1	0	0	–		3	0	12	1
Zibo Cuju	2021	China League One	0	0	0	0	–		0	0	0	0
Zibo Cuju	Total		9	1	0	0	0	0	3	0	12	1
Nanjing City	2021	China League One	9	1	0	0	–		0	0	9	1
Nanjing City	2022	China League One	0	0	0	0	–		0	0	0	0
Nanjing City	Total		9	1	0	0	0	0	0	0	9	1
Career total			89	6	2	0	0	0	4	0	95	6

== Honours ==
Shaanxi Chang'an Union

- CMCL play-offs: 2023
