= Cong Zhen =

Chinese footballer

Cong Zhen 丛震
Personal information
- Full name: Cong Zhen
- Date of birth: 9 February 1997 (age 29)
- Place of birth: Dalian, Liaoning, China
- Height: 1.80 m (5 ft 11 in)
- Position: Midfielder

Youth career
- Dalian Shide
- 2016: Shanghai Shenhua

Senior career*
Years	Team	Apps	(Gls)
2014–2015	Dalian Transcendence	9	(1)
2017–2022	Shanghai Shenhua	40	(1)
2020	→ Wuhan Zall (loan)	7	(0)
2021	→ Tianjin Jinmen Tiger (loan)	8	(0)
2023	Dalian Zhixing	12	(2)
2024	Dalian Kun City	13	(0)

International career^{‡}
2016–2017	China U-20	6	(1)
2018	China U-23	12	(1)
- * Club domestic league appearances and goals as of 1 January 2026 ‡ National team caps and goals as of 17 November 2018

Cong Zhen (simplified Chinese: 丛震; traditional Chinese: 叢震; pinyin: Cóng Zhèn; born 9 February 1997) is a Chinese footballer.

== Club career ==
Cong Zhen started his professional football career in 2014 when he joined China League Two side Dalian Transcendence. On 25 April 2015, he scored his first senior goal by shooting the winner in the injury time against Yinchuan Helanshan, which gave Transcendence a 4–3 away win. He transferred to Chinese Super League side Shanghai Shenhua's youth academy on 25 February 2016. Cong was promoted to Shanghai Shenhua's first team squad in 2017. On 13 May 2017, he made his first-tier debut in a 0–0 away draw against Henan Jianye as the benefactor of the league's new rule that at least one Under-23 player must be in the starting line-up and was substituted off for Tao Jin in the 37th minute.

On 17 July 2020, Cong was loaned out to fellow top tier club Wuhan Zall for the 2020 Chinese Super League campaign. The following season he would be loaned out again to another top tier club in Tianjin Jinmen Tiger for the 2021 Chinese Super League campaign. On his return to his parent club he would only make a single appearance before his contract expired on 1 February 2023. On 3 April 2023 Cong would join third tier club Dalian Zhixing on a free transfer.

== Career statistics ==
As of 1 January 2026.

Appearances and goals by club, season and competition
Club	Season	League			National Cup		Continental		Other		Total	
Club	Season	Division	Apps	Goals	Apps	Goals	Apps	Goals	Apps	Goals	Apps	Goals
Dalian Transcendence	2014	China League Two	1	0	0	0	-		-		1	0
Dalian Transcendence	2015	China League Two	8	1	0	0	-		-		8	1
Dalian Transcendence	Total		9	1	0	0	0	0	0	0	9	1
Shanghai Shenhua	2017	Chinese Super League	9	0	2	0	0	0	-		11	0
Shanghai Shenhua	2018	Chinese Super League	12	0	1	0	1	0	1 (Note: Appearance(s) in Chinese FA Super Cup)	0	15	0
Shanghai Shenhua	2019	Chinese Super League	18	1	2	0	-		-		20	1
Shanghai Shenhua	2022	Chinese Super League	1	0	0	0	-		-		1	0
Shanghai Shenhua	Total		40	1	5	0	1	0	1	0	47	1
Wuhan Zall (loan)	2020	Chinese Super League	7	0	5	0	-		2 (Note: Appearance(s) in Promotion/Relegation Play-offs)	0	14	0
Tianjin Jinmen Tiger (loan)	2021	Chinese Super League	8	0	1	0	-		-		9	0
Dalian Zhixing	2023	China League Two	12	2	1	0	-		-		13	2
Dalian Kun City	2024	China League Two	13	0	2	1	-		-		15	1
Career total			89	4	14	1	1	0	3	0	107	5

== Honours ==
=== Club ===
Shanghai Shenhua

- Chinese FA Cup: 2017, 2019
