= Wang Meng (footballer) =

Chinese association football player

Personal information
- Date of birth: 16 March 1993 (age 33)
- Height: 1.85 m (6 ft 1 in)
- Position: Defender

Youth career
- –2011: Jiangsu FA
- 2011–2012: Oliveirense
- 2013: Amora
- 2013: Jiangsu FA
- 2014–2015: Yanbian Changbaishan

Senior career*
Years	Team	Apps	(Gls)
2015	Yanbian Changbaishan	1	(0)
2016	Shenyang Dongjin	7	(0)
2016–2017	Suzhou Dongwu	8	(0)
2018	Yanbian Funde	1	(0)
2019–2020	Yancheng Elk Sea	27	(0)
- * Club domestic league appearances and goals as of 14:01, 3 August 2021 (UTC)

Wang Meng (Chinese: 王猛; born 16 March 1993) is a Chinese footballer.

== Career statistics ==
=== Club ===
As of 3 August 2021.

Club	Season	League			Cup		Continental		Other		Total	
Club	Season	Division	Apps	Goals	Apps	Goals	Apps	Goals	Apps	Goals	Apps	Goals
Yanbian Changbaishan	2015	China League One	1	0	0	0	–		0	0	1	0
Shenyang Dongjin	2016	China League Two	7	0	0	0	–		0	0	7	0
Suzhou Dongwu	2016	China League Two	8	0	0	0	–		0	0	8	0
Suzhou Dongwu	2017	China League Two	0	0	0	0	–		0	0	0	0
Suzhou Dongwu	Total		8	0	0	0	0	0	0	0	8	0
Yanbian Funde	2018	China League One	1	0	1 (Note: Appearances in the Chinese FA Cup)	0	–		0	0	2	0
Yancheng Elk Sea	2019	China League Two	27	0	1	0	–		2 (Note: Appearances in the China League Two playoffs)	0	30	0
Career total			44	0	2	0	0	0	2	0	48	0
