= Cao Chuanyu =

Chinese association football player

Personal information
- Date of birth: 21 January 1995 (age 31)
- Place of birth: Shanghai, China
- Height: 1.80 m (5 ft 11 in)
- Position: Defender

Youth career
- –2017: Shanghai Shenhua
- 2015: → CF Cracks (youth loan)

Senior career*
Years	Team	Apps	(Gls)
2017–2020	Shanghai Shenhua	0	(0)
2017	→ Shanghai JuJu Sports (loan)	12	(1)
2019	→ Shanghai Shenxin (loan)	12	(0)
- * Club domestic league appearances and goals as of 14:01, 28 July 2021 (UTC)

Cao Chuanyu (simplified Chinese: 曹传宇; traditional Chinese: 曹傳宇; pinyin: Cáo Chuányǔ; born 21 January 1995) is a Chinese former footballer who played as a defender.

== Career statistics ==
=== Club ===
As of 28 June 2021.

Club	Season	League			Cup		Continental		Other		Total	
Club	Season	Division	Apps	Goals	Apps	Goals	Apps	Goals	Apps	Goals	Apps	Goals
Shanghai Shenhua	2017	Chinese Super League	0	0	0	0	–		0	0	0	0
Shanghai Shenhua	2018	Chinese Super League	0	0	0	0	–		0	0	0	0
Shanghai Shenhua	2019	Chinese Super League	0	0	0	0	–		0	0	0	0
Shanghai Shenhua	2020	Chinese Super League	0	0	0	0	0	0	0	0	0	0
Shanghai Shenhua	Total		0	0	0	0	0	0	0	0	0	0
Shanghai JuJu Sports (loan)	2017	China League Two	12	1	0	0	–		1 (Note: Appearances in the China League Two playoffs)	0	13	1
Shanghai Shenxin (loan)	2019	China League One	12	0	2 (Note: Appearances in the Chinese FA Cup)	0	–		0	0	14	0
Career total			24	1	2	0	0	0	1	0	27	1
