= Wang Lin (footballer) =

Chinese footballer

Wang Lin 王林
Personal information
- Full name: Wang Lin
- Date of birth: 19 September 1987 (age 39)
- Place of birth: Chengdu, Sichuan, China
- Height: 1.76 m (5 ft 9 in)
- Position: Full-back

Youth career
- 2001–2005: Sichuan Guancheng

Senior career*
Years	Team	Apps	(Gls)
2006	Shanghai United	13	(0)
2007–2012	Shanghai Shenhua	39	(0)
2007	→ Liaoning Guangyuan (loan)	18	(0)
2009–2010	→ Pudong Zobon (loan)	27	(0)
2013–2015	Hangzhou Greentown	79	(1)
2016–2018	Shanghai Shenhua	36	(0)
- * Club domestic league appearances and goals as of 20 May 2018

Wang Lin (Chinese: 王林; pinyin: Wáng Lín; born 19 September 1987) is a Chinese footballer.

== Club career ==
Wang Lin started his football career by playing for Sichuan Guancheng's youth team, however before he had the chance to be promoted to the first team, the club went under and was disbanded. Wang was however considered a young prospect and top tier club Shanghai United were willing to buy him for 300,000 yuan before they promoted him to their senior squad and gave him his professional debut on 23 April 2006 in a 1-1 draw against Xiamen Lanshi. As the 2006 season went on, Wang would go on to establish himself as a regular within the match day squad and play in thirteen league games. However, before the 2007 season began, Shanghai United merged with city rivals Shanghai Shenhua.

The merger of both the Shanghai clubs saw the Shanghai Shenhua have an exceptionally large squad and Wang was loaned out to S.League side Liaoning Guangyuan halfway through the 2007 season. He gained significant playing time at the club, however when the 2007 season ended, it was discovered that the club's manager and several players were taking bribes. Wang was suspected of match-fixing and was then found guilty, remaining in Singapore for four months. After returning to China in 2008, he would eventually return to playing football when he was loaned out to second tier club Pudong Zobon halfway through the 2009 season, making his debut against Nanchang Hengyuan on 10 August 2009 in a 2-0 loss. By the end of the 2009 season, he would make ten further appearances and remained at Pudong for the 2010 season where he made 16 appearances. After becoming a starter in the 2011 season for Shanghai, Wang became a squad player in the 2012 season for the club.

On 14 January 2013, Wang transferred to fellow Chinese Super League club Hangzhou Greentown. On 15 January 2016, Wang returned to Shanghai Shenhua. Shanghai Shenhua announced Wang's departure on 14 February 2019 when his contract expired.

== Career statistics ==
Statistics accurate as of match played 20 May 2018

Club performance			League		Cup		League Cup		Continental		Total	
Season	Club	League	Apps	Goals	Apps	Goals	Apps	Goals	Apps	Goals	Apps	Goals
China PR			League		FA Cup		CSL Cup		Asia		Total	
2006	Shanghai United	Chinese Super League	13	0	0	0	-	-	-	-	13	0
Singapore			League		FA Cup		League Cup		Asia		Total	
2007	Liaoning Guangyuan	S.League	18	0	0	0	-	-	-	-	18	0
China PR			League		FA Cup		CSL Cup		Asia		Total	
2008	Shanghai Shenhua	Chinese Super League	0	0	-	-	-	-	-	-	0	0
2009	Shanghai Pudong Zobon F.C.	China League One	11	0	-	-	-	-	-	-	11	0
2010	Shanghai Pudong Zobon F.C.	China League One	16	0	-	-	-	-	-	-	16	0
2011	Shanghai Shenhua	Chinese Super League	23	0	2	0	-	-	-	-	25	0
2012	Shanghai Shenhua	Chinese Super League	16	0	1	0	-	-	2	0	19	0
2013	Hangzhou Greentown	Chinese Super League	25	0	0	0	-	-	-	-	25	0
2014	Hangzhou Greentown	Chinese Super League	29	1	0	0	-	-	-	-	29	1
2015	Hangzhou Greentown	Chinese Super League	25	0	0	0	-	-	-	-	25	0
2016	Shanghai Shenhua	Chinese Super League	8	0	5	0	-	-	-	-	13	0
2017	Shanghai Shenhua	Chinese Super League	24	0	5	0	-	-	1	0	30	0
2018	Shanghai Shenhua	Chinese Super League	4	0	1	0	-	-	3	0	8	0
Career total			212	1	14	0	0	0	6	0	232	1
