= Shen Jun (footballer) =

Chinese footballer

Shen Jun 沈俊
Personal information
- Date of birth: 5 October 1986 (age 40)
- Place of birth: Shanghai, China
- Height: 1.88 m (6 ft 2 in)
- Position: Goalkeeper

Youth career
- Shanghai Shenhua
- 2004–2008: Donghua University

Senior career*
Years	Team	Apps	(Gls)
2009–2013	Guizhou Renhe	32	(0)
2014–2019	Shanghai Shenhua	3	(0)
2015	→ CF Crack's (loan)	15	(0)
- * Club domestic league appearances and goals as of 31 December 2019

Shen Jun (Chinese: 沈俊; pinyin: Shěn Jùn; born 5 October 1986) is a Chinese football player.

== Club career ==
Shen is a product of Shanghai Shenhua's youth team system. He moved to Donghua University in 2004 and participated in the Chinese Collegiate Football League. Shen was signed by Chinese Super League side Shaanxi Chanba in 2009 after he graduated from university. He made his senior debut for Shaanxi on 2 August 2009, in a 2–0 defeat against Chengdu Blades. He appeared 4 times in the 2009 league season. Shen became the first choice goalkeeper of the team in the 2010 league season which he gained 27 appearances. However, he lost his position to Zhang Lie after Zhang joined Shaanxi in 2011. He followed the club to move to Guizhou in 2012.

In February 2014, Shen transferred to his youth club Shanghai Shenhua. On 27 September 2014, he made his debut for Shanghai in a 2–0 away loss against Shandong Luneng. In January 2015, he was loaned to Shanghai Shenhua's satellite team CF Crack's in the Primera Regional de la Comunidad Valenciana. He was sent to the Shenhua reserved team in 2016 and 2018.

== Career statistics ==
Statistics accurate as of match played 31 December 2019.

Appearances and goals by club, season and competition
Club	Season	League			Cup		Continental		Other		Total	
Club	Season	Division	Apps	Goals	Apps	Goals	Apps	Goals	Apps	Goals	Apps	Goals
Guizhou Renhe	2009	Chinese Super League	4	0	—		—		—		4	0
Guizhou Renhe	2010	Chinese Super League	27	0	—		—		—		27	0
Guizhou Renhe	2011	Chinese Super League	0	0	0	0	—		—		0	0
Guizhou Renhe	2012	Chinese Super League	0	0	2	0	—		—		2	0
Guizhou Renhe	2013	Chinese Super League	1	0	1	0	0	0	—		2	0
Guizhou Renhe	Total		32	0	3	0	0	0	0	0	35	0
Shanghai Shenhua	2014	Chinese Super League	1	0	0	0	—		—		1	0
Shanghai Shenhua	2015	Chinese Super League	0	0	0	0	—		—		0	0
Shanghai Shenhua	2017	Chinese Super League	0	0	0	0	—		—		0	0
Shanghai Shenhua	2019	Chinese Super League	2	0	0	0	—		—		2	0
Shanghai Shenhua	Total		3	0	0	0	0	0	0	0	3	0
CF Crack's (loan)	2014−15	Primera Regional (Valencia)	15	0	—		—		—		15	0
Career total			50	0	3	0	0	0	0	0	53	0

== Honours ==
Donghua University

- Chinese Collegiate Football League: 2004–05
