= Xu Junmin =

Chinese footballer

Xu Junmin 徐骏敏
Personal information
- Full name: Xu Junmin
- Date of birth: 22 September 1994 (age 32)
- Place of birth: Shanghai, China
- Height: 1.75 m (5 ft 9 in)
- Position: Midfielder

Senior career*
Years	Team	Apps	(Gls)
2015–2017	Shanghai Shenhua	17	(0)
2015	→ CF Crack's (loan)	12	(9)
2018–2019	Shanghai Shenxin	54	(14)
2020–2021	Nantong Zhiyun	14	(5)
2021–2022	Kunshan FC	50	(9)
2023	Nantong Zhiyun	7	(0)
2024	Nantong Zhiyun	6	(0)
- * Club domestic league appearances and goals as of 26 December 2022

Xu Junmin (Chinese: 徐骏敏; born 22 September 1994) is a Chinese former professional footballer and coach who played as a midfielder.

On 10 September 2024, Chinese Football Association announced that Xu was banned from football-related activities for lifetime for involving in match-fixing.

== Club career ==
Xu Junmin would be part of the Shanghai Lucky Star Youth Training program before joining Chinese Super League side Shanghai Shenhua who loaned him out to lower league Spanish club CF Crack's. On 27 May 2016, he made his debut for Shenhua in the 2016 Chinese Super League against Tianjin Teda, coming on as a substitute for Cao Yunding in the 89th minute.

On 28 February 2018, Xu transferred to League One side Shanghai Shenxin. He would make his debut on 17 March 2018 in a league game against Qingdao Huanghai in a 3–3 draw. After two seasons at the club, the owner would admit to financial difficulties, which unfortunately saw Xu be part of the team that was relegated and disbanded at the end of the 2019 China League One campaign. He would subsequently join another second-tier club in Nantong Zhiyun on 16 May 2020 on a free transfer.

On 10 April 2021 he would join second-tier club Kunshan on a free transfer. He would go on to make his debut in a league game on 25 April 2021 against Beijing BSU in a 2–2 draw. He would then go on to establish himself as regular within the team that won the division and promotion to the top tier at the end of the 2022 China League One campaign.

== Career statistics ==
Statistics accurate as of match played 26 December 2022.

Club	Season	League			National Cup		Continental		Other		Total	
Club	Season	Division	Apps	Goals	Apps	Goals	Apps	Goals	Apps	Goals	Apps	Goals
Shanghai Shenhua	2015	Chinese Super League	0	0	0	0	-		-		0	0
Shanghai Shenhua	2016	Chinese Super League	2	0	3	0	-		-		5	0
Shanghai Shenhua	2017	Chinese Super League	15	0	2	0	0	0	-		17	0
Shanghai Shenhua	Total		17	0	5	0	0	0	0	0	22	0
CF Crack's (loan)	2014−15	Primera Regional (Valencia)	12	9	-		-		-		12	9
Shanghai Shenxin	2018	China League One	26	6	1	1	-		-		27	7
Shanghai Shenxin	2019	China League One	28	8	2	0	-		-		30	8
Shanghai Shenxin	Total		54	14	3	1	0	0	0	0	57	15
Nantong Zhiyun	2020	China League One	14	5	-		-		-		14	5
Kunshan	2021	China League One	19	6	1	0	-		-		20	6
Kunshan	2022	China League One	31	3	1	0	-		-		32	3
Kunshan	Total		50	9	2	0	0	0	0	0	52	9
Career total			147	37	10	1	0	0	0	0	157	38

== Honours ==
=== Club ===
Kunshan

- China League One: 2022
