= Li Yunqiu =

Chinese footballer

Li Yunqiu 李运秋
Personal information
- Date of birth: October 3, 1990 (age 36)
- Place of birth: Shanghai, China
- Height: 1.74 m (5 ft 8 1/2 in)
- Position: Right-back

Youth career
- 2000–2005: Genbao Football Academy

Senior career*
Years	Team	Apps	(Gls)
2006–2013	Shanghai East Asia	114	(1)
2014–2015	Beijing Guoan	16	(0)
2016–2022	Shanghai Shenhua	61	(0)
- * Club domestic league appearances and goals as of 31 January 2023

Li Yunqiu (Chinese: 李运秋; pinyin: Lǐ Yùnqiū; born 3 October 1990) is a former Chinese footballer who plays as a right-back.

== Club career ==
Born in Shanghai, Li joined Genbao Football Academy in July 2000 and was promoted to Shanghai East Asia squad in 2006 for the China League Two campaign. He made an impression in right-back position within the team as Shanghai East Asia won promotion to the second tier in the 2007 season. His position was swung between starting line-up and bench after 2010 season. Li appeared in 18 league matches in the 2012 season, as Shanghai East Asia won the champions and promoted to the top flight. On 12 May 2013, he scored his first senior goal in a league match which Shanghai East Asia lost to Hangzhou Greentown 2–1.

On 19 February 2014, Li transferred to fellow Chinese Super League and 2014 AFC Champions League qualified side Beijing Guoan. Li would have a difficult first season at Beijing Guoan after not being included in the AFC Champions League squad because of a late VISA application, as well picking up an injury during preseason, which meant he did not make his debut until 26 July 2014 in a league game against Changchun Yatai F.C. in a 2–2 draw that also saw Li receive a red card. Despite having paid 7 million Yuan for his services, Li would become the club's third choice right-back behind Zhang Chengdong and Zhou Ting and Beijing were willing to listen to offers to sell him. He moved to another Super League club Shanghai Greenland Shenhua on 25 February 2016. He extended his contract with the club for five years on 19 November 2017. He would go on to be a squad player until his contract expired and he left the team on 1 February 2023.

== Career statistics ==
Statistics accurate as of match played 31 January 2023.

Appearances and goals by club, season and competition
Club	Season	League			National Cup		Continental		Other		Total	
Club	Season	Division	Apps	Goals	Apps	Goals	Apps	Goals	Apps	Goals	Apps	Goals
Shanghai East Asia	2006	China League Two			-		-		-			
Shanghai East Asia	2007	China League Two			-		-		-			
Shanghai East Asia	2008	China League One	23	0	-		-		-		23	0
Shanghai East Asia	2009	China League One	20	0	-		-		-		20	0
Shanghai East Asia	2010	China League One	17	0	-		-		-		17	0
Shanghai East Asia	2011	China League One	10	0	0	0	-		-		10	0
Shanghai East Asia	2012	China League One	18	0	1	0	-		-		19	0
Shanghai East Asia	2013	Chinese Super League	26	1	0	0	-		-		26	1
Shanghai East Asia	Total		114	1	1	0	0	0	0	0	115	1
Beijing Guoan	2014	Chinese Super League	3	0	0	0	0	0	-		3	0
Beijing Guoan	2015	Chinese Super League	13	0	2	0	3	0	-		18	0
Beijing Guoan	Total		16	0	2	0	3	0	0	0	21	0
Shanghai Shenhua	2016	Chinese Super League	8	0	1	0	-		-		9	0
Shanghai Shenhua	2017	Chinese Super League	21	0	8	0	0	0	-		29	0
Shanghai Shenhua	2018	Chinese Super League	12	0	0	0	3	0	1 (Note: Appearances in Chinese FA Super Cup)	0	16	0
Shanghai Shenhua	2019	Chinese Super League	10	0	2	0	-		-		12	0
Shanghai Shenhua	2020	Chinese Super League	1	0	0	0	0	0	-		1	0
Shanghai Shenhua	2021	Chinese Super League	2	0	0	0	-		-		2	0
Shanghai Shenhua	2022	Chinese Super League	7	0	0	0	-		-		7	0
Shanghai Shenhua	Total		61	0	11	0	3	0	1	0	76	0
Career total			191	1	14	0	6	0	1	0	212	1

== Honours ==
=== Club ===
Shanghai East Asia

- China League One: 2012
- China League Two: 2007

Shanghai Shenhua

- Chinese FA Cup: 2017, 2019
