= Tao Jin (footballer) =

Chinese footballer

Tao Jin 陶金
Personal information
- Date of birth: June 2, 1985 (age 41)
- Place of birth: Shanghai, China
- Height: 1.83 m (6 ft 0 in)
- Position: Defender

Senior career*
Years	Team	Apps	(Gls)
2006–2018	Shanghai Shenhua	54	(0)
2013	→ Hunan Billows (loan)	11	(0)
- * Club domestic league appearances and goals as of 31 December 2018

Tao Jin (Chinese: 陶金; pinyin: Táo Jīn; born 2 June 1985) is a Chinese football player.

== Club career ==
Tao Jin started his professional football career in 2006 with Shanghai Shenhua after graduating from their youth team. He would have to wait until the 2008 league season before he would make his senior debut against Hangzhou Greentown F.C. on August 30, 2008 in a 1-1 draw, league game. Despite his limited playing time with Shanghai he was still included in Shanghai's 2009 AFC Champions League squad and under Jia Xiuquan as the new team manager would start to establish himself within the team's defence throughout the season. Shanghai Shenhua announced Tao's departure on 14 February 2019 when his contract expired.

== Career statistics ==
Statistics accurate as of match played 31 December 2018

Appearances and goals by club, season and competition
Club	Season	League			National Cup		Continental		Other		Total	
Club	Season	Division	Apps	Goals	Apps	Goals	Apps	Goals	Apps	Goals	Apps	Goals
Shanghai Shenhua	2006	Chinese Super League	0	0	0	0	0	0	-		0	0
Shanghai Shenhua	2007	Chinese Super League	0	0	-		0	0	-		0	0
Shanghai Shenhua	2008	Chinese Super League	1	0	-		-		-		1	0
Shanghai Shenhua	2009	Chinese Super League	11	0	-		0	0	-		11	0
Shanghai Shenhua	2010	Chinese Super League	0	0	-		-		-		0	0
Shanghai Shenhua	2011	Chinese Super League	3	0	0	0	0	0	-		3	0
Shanghai Shenhua	2012	Chinese Super League	0	0	0	0	-		-		0	0
Shanghai Shenhua	2013	Chinese Super League	0	0	1	0	-		-		1	0
Shanghai Shenhua	2014	Chinese Super League	2	0	1	0	-		-		3	0
Shanghai Shenhua	2015	Chinese Super League	5	0	4	0	-		-		9	0
Shanghai Shenhua	2016	Chinese Super League	12	0	3	0	-		-		15	0
Shanghai Shenhua	2017	Chinese Super League	20	0	6	0	1	0	-		27	0
Shanghai Shenhua	2018	Chinese Super League	0	0	0	0	3	0	-		3	0
Shanghai Shenhua	Total		54	0	15	0	4	0	0	0	73	0
Hunan Billows (loan)	2013	China League One	11	0	0	0	-		-		11	0
Career total			65	0	15	0	4	0	0	0	84	0

== Honours ==
=== Club ===
Shanghai Shenhua

- Chinese FA Cup: 2017
