= Wu Changqi =

Chinese association football player

Personal information
- Date of birth: 30 June 1993 (age 33)
- Place of birth: Shanghai, China
- Height: 1.89 m (6 ft 2 in)
- Position: Forward

Youth career
- –2013: Tianjin Huochetou

Senior career*
| Years | Team | Apps | (Gls) |
| 2013 | Tianjin Huochetou | | |
| 2014–2020 | Shanghai Shenhua | 0 | (0) |
| 2015–2016 | → Atlético Museros (loan) | 21 | (9) |
| 2016–2017 | → La Roda (loan) | 0 | (0) |
| 2017 | → Shanghai Sunfun (loan) | 14 | (3) |
- * Club domestic league appearances and goals as of 14:01, 22 February 2022 (UTC)

Wu Changqi (Chinese: 吴长琦; born 30 June 1993) is a Chinese footballer.

== Career ==
Born in Shanghai, Wu moved to hometown club Shanghai Shenhua in 2014, having spent time with Tianjin Huochetou. After a series of loan moves, including two in Spain, and one in the China League Two with Shanghai Sunfun, Wu was ostracized from the Shanghai Shenhua squad, going three seasons without an appearance for the Chinese Super League club. He was released at the end of the 2020 season, at the expiration of his contract.

== Career statistics ==
=== Club ===
As of 22 February 2022.

| Club | Season | League | | | Cup | | Continental | | Other | | Total | |
| Club | Season | Division | Apps | Goals | Apps | Goals | Apps | Goals | Apps | Goals | Apps | Goals |
|---|---|---|---|---|---|---|---|---|---|---|---|---|
| Shanghai Shenhua | 2014 | Chinese Super League | 0 | 0 | 0 | 0 | 0 | 0 | 0 | 0 | 0 | 0 |
| Shanghai Shenhua | 2015 | Chinese Super League | 0 | 0 | 0 | 0 | 0 | 0 | 0 | 0 | 0 | 0 |
| Shanghai Shenhua | 2016 | Chinese Super League | 0 | 0 | 0 | 0 | 0 | 0 | 0 | 0 | 0 | 0 |
| Shanghai Shenhua | 2017 | Chinese Super League | 0 | 0 | 0 | 0 | 0 | 0 | 0 | 0 | 0 | 0 |
| Shanghai Shenhua | 2018 | Chinese Super League | 0 | 0 | 0 | 0 | 0 | 0 | 0 | 0 | 0 | 0 |
| Shanghai Shenhua | 2019 | Chinese Super League | 0 | 0 | 0 | 0 | 0 | 0 | 0 | 0 | 0 | 0 |
| Shanghai Shenhua | 2020 | Chinese Super League | 0 | 0 | 0 | 0 | 0 | 0 | 0 | 0 | 0 | 0 |
| Shanghai Shenhua | Total | | 0 | 0 | 0 | 0 | 0 | 0 | 0 | 0 | 0 | 0 |
| Atlético Museros (loan) | 2015–16 | Preferente Valenciana | 21 | 9 | 0 | 0 | – | | 0 | 0 | 21 | 9 |
| La Roda (loan) | 2016–17 | Segunda División B | 0 | 0 | 0 | 0 | – | | 0 | 0 | 0 | 0 |
| Shanghai Sunfun (loan) | 2017 | China League Two | 14 | 3 | 1 (Note: Appearances in the Chinese FA Cup) | 1 | – | | 0 | 0 | 15 | 4 |
| Career total | | | 35 | 12 | 1 | 1 | 0 | 0 | 0 | 0 | 36 | 13 |
