= Wang Shouting (footballer) =

Chinese professional football player

Wang Shouting 王寿挺
Personal information
- Date of birth: September 3, 1985 (age 41)
- Place of birth: Dalian, Liaoning, China
- Height: 1.85 m (6 ft 1 in)
- Position: Midfielder

Youth career
- Liaoning

Senior career*
Years	Team	Apps	(Gls)
2005	Shanghai United	31	(2)
2006	Dalian Shide	0	(0)
2007–2011	Henan Jianye	91	(2)
2012	Liaoning Whowin	4	(0)
2012–2018	Shanghai Shenhua	109	(1)
2018	→ Shanghai Shenxin (loan)	12	(1)
2018	→ Changchun Yatai (loan)	6	(0)
2019–2021	Guizhou Hengfeng	68	(1)
2022	Dalian Zhixing	0	(0)
2022-2023	Shanghai Jiading Huilong	19	(0)

International career
2005	China U-20		

Managerial career
- 2022-: Shanghai Jiading Huilong (assistant)
Medal record
Representing China
Men's football
AFC Youth Championship
Silver medal – second place	2004 َ Malaysia	Team
- * Club domestic league appearances and goals as of 15 April 2022

Wang Shouting (simplified Chinese: 王寿挺; traditional Chinese: 王壽挺; pinyin: Wáng Shòutǐng; born on September 3, 1985) is a Chinese former professional football player. He played as midfielder.

== Club career ==
Wang Shouting was a promising youngster when he played for the Liaoning's youth teams and was good enough to be called up to the Chinese Under-20 football team. He attracted the interests of Shanghai United and would start his professional football career when he joined during the 2005 Chinese Super League season. He made his league debut on July 3, 2005 in a 1-1 draw against Liaoning Zhongyu and then continue to establish himself within the squad. This caught the attention of Dalian Shide and he transferred to them at the beginning of the 2006 Chinese Super League season, however his time with them was short when he was unable to break into the first team squad.

Still a relatively young player with top tier experience saw newly promoted Henan Construction willing to take Wang Shouting and revive his career with them. He would immediately become a regular when he started in their second game of the season against Beijing Guoan on March 11, 2007 in a 0-0 draw.

On 28 February 2018, Wang was loaned to China League One side Shanghai Shenxin for one season. In July 2018, his loan spell was cut short and was loaned to first-tier club Changchun Yatai instead for the rest of the season. Shanghai Shenhua announced Wang's departure on 14 February 2019 when his contract expired.

On 28 February 2019, Wang signed a contract with newly-relegated China League One side Guizhou Hengfeng.

== Career statistics ==
Statistics accurate as of match played 31 December 2020

Appearances and goals by club, season and competition
Club	Season	League			National Cup		League Cup		Continental		Total	
Club	Season	Division	Apps	Goals	Apps	Goals	Apps	Goals	Apps	Goals	Apps	Goals
Shanghai United	2003	Chinese Jia-B League	15	0	1	0	-		-		16	0
Shanghai United	2004	China League One	8	2	1	0	-		-		9	2
Shanghai United	2005	Chinese Super League	8	0	0	0	0	0	-		8	0
Shanghai United	Total		31	2	2	0	0	0	0	0	33	2
Dalian Shide	2006	Chinese Super League	0	0	1	1	-		1	0	2	1
Henan Construction	2007	Chinese Super League	23	0	-		-		-		23	0
Henan Construction	2008	Chinese Super League	24	1	-		-		-		24	1
Henan Construction	2009	Chinese Super League	14	0	-		-		-		14	0
Henan Construction	2010	Chinese Super League	17	1	-		-		3	0	20	1
Henan Construction	2011	Chinese Super League	13	0	2	0	-		-		15	0
Henan Construction	Total		91	2	2	0	0	0	3	0	96	2
Liaoning Whowin	2012	Chinese Super League	4	0	0	0	-		-		4	0
Shanghai Shenhua	2012	Chinese Super League	6	0	1	0	-		-		7	0
Shanghai Shenhua	2013	Chinese Super League	24	0	1	0	-		-		25	0
Shanghai Shenhua	2014	Chinese Super League	27	0	4	0	-		-		31	0
Shanghai Shenhua	2015	Chinese Super League	22	0	4	0	-		-		26	0
Shanghai Shenhua	2016	Chinese Super League	8	0	4	0	-		-		12	0
Shanghai Shenhua	2017	Chinese Super League	22	1	5	0	-		0	0	27	1
Shanghai Shenhua	Total		109	1	19	0	0	0	0	0	128	1
Shanghai Shenxin (loan)	2018	China League One	12	1	0	0	-		-		12	1
Changchun Yatai (loan)	2018	Chinese Super League	6	0	0	0	-		-		6	0
Guizhou Hengfeng	2019	China League One	27	1	0	0	-		-		27	1
Guizhou Hengfeng	2020	China League One	13	0	1	0	-		-		14	0
Guizhou Hengfeng	Total		40	1	1	0	0	0	0	0	41	1
Career total			293	7	25	1	0	0	4	0	322	8

== Honours ==
=== Club ===
Shanghai Shenhua

- Chinese FA Cup: 2017
