= Shanghai JuJu Sports F.C. =

Chinese football club

Shanghai Sh. JuJu Sports Shànghǎi Jùyùndòng 上海聚运动
- Full name: Shanghai Sh. JuJu Sports Football Club 上海聚运动足球俱乐部
- Founded: 2013
- Dissolved: 2018

Shanghai Sh. JuJu Sports Football Club was an association football club from Shanghai, China, that most recently participated in China League Two.

== History ==
Pu'er Wanhao F.C. was established in 2013 in the city of Pu'er, Yunnan Province. They moved to Kunming and changed its name to Yunnan Wanhao F.C. before the 2015 season. After the season, it moved to the city of Shanghai and changed their name to Shanghai JuJu Sports F.C. in January 2016.

Shanghai Sh. JuJu Sports F.C. withdrew from China League Two before the 2018 season and was dissolved.

== Name history ==
- 2013–2014 Pu'er Wanhao F.C. 普洱万豪
- 2015 Yunnan Wanhao F.C. 云南万豪
- 2016–2018 Shanghai Sh. JuJu Sports F.C. 上海聚运动

== Managerial history ==
- (China) Zhang Biao (2014–2015)
- (Serbia) Radomir Koković (2016)
- (Serbia) Dragan Kokotović (2017)
- (Japan) Hajime Ishii (2017)
- (Romania) Ciprian Cezar Tudorascu (2017)

== Results ==
All-time league rankings

As of the end of 2017 season.

Year	Div	Pld	W	D	L	GF	GA	GD	Pts	Pos.	FA Cup	Super Cup	AFC	Att./G	Stadium
2014	3	16	1	4	11	3	26	−23	7	8^{1}	DNE	DNQ	DNQ		Honghe University Stadium
2015	3	14	3	5	6	9	19	−10	14	6^{1}	R1	DNQ	DNQ	710	Hongta Sport Center
2016	3	20	3	4	13	17	36	-19	13	20	R2	DNQ	DNQ	423	Shanghai University Sports Center Stadium
2017	3	24	5	7	12	19	36	-17	22	19	R1	DNQ	DNQ	418	Shanghai Kangqiao Football Base

- ^1 in group stage.

Key

	China top division
	China second division
	China third division
W	Winners
RU	Runners-up
3	Third place
	Relegated

- Pld = Played
- W = Games won
- D = Games drawn
- L = Games lost
- F = Goals for
- A = Goals against
- Pts = Points
- Pos = Final position
- DNQ = Did not qualify
- DNE = Did not enter
- NH = Not held
- – = Does not exist
- R1 = Round 1
- R2 = Round 2
- R3 = Round 3
- R4 = Round 4
- F = Final
- SF = Semi-finals
- QF = Quarter-finals
- R16 = Round of 16
- Group = Group stage
- GS2 = Second Group stage
- QR1 = First Qualifying Round
- QR2 = Second Qualifying Round
- QR3 = Third Qualifying Round
