= 2011 Hong Kong–Shanghai Inter Club Championship =

- Event: Hong Kong–Shanghai Inter Club Championship
Wofoo Tai Po	Shanghai East Asia
3	10

First leg
Wofoo Tai Po	Shanghai East Asia
2	3
- Date: 5 November 2011
- Venue: Mong Kok Stadium, Hong Kong
- Referee: Ng Kai Lam
- Attendance: 1,876

Second leg
Shanghai East Asia	Wofoo Tai Po
7	1
- Date: 12 November 2011
- Venue: Yuanshen Sports Centre Stadium, Shanghai

The 2011 Hong Kong–Shanghai Inter Club Championship was held on 5 November and 12 November 2011. The first leg was played at Mong Kok Stadium, Hong Kong, with the second leg taken place at Yuanshen Sports Centre Stadium, Shanghai.

Wofoo Tai Po was selected to represent Hong Kong due to a better league position (5th) in the previous season than the other applicant Citizen (6th).

The second leg in Shanghai is also named as 2011 Dongping National Forest Park Cup after sponsorship from Shanghai Cong Ming Travel.

== Squads ==
=== Shanghai East Asia ===
- Chairman: Xu Genbao
- Coaches: Xu Zubao, Jiang Bingyao, Bian Genxi, Zhang Guanxing
- Physio: Sun Guozhu

No.	Pos.	Player	Date of birth (age)	Caps	Club
1	GK	(China) Yan Junling	28 January 1991 (aged 20)		(China) Shanghai East Asia
2	DF	(China) Li Yunqiu	3 October 1990 (aged 21)		(China) Shanghai East Asia
3	DF	(China) Tang Jiaqi	5 October 1989 (aged 22)		(China) Shanghai East Asia
4	DF	(China) Wang Shenchao	8 February 1989 (aged 22)		(China) Shanghai East Asia
5	MF	(Benin) Romuald Boco	8 July 1985 (aged 26)		(China) Shanghai East Asia
6	MF	(China) Cai Huikang	10 October 1989 (aged 22)		(China) Shanghai East Asia
7	MF	(China) Wu Lei	19 November 1991 (aged 19)		(China) Shanghai East Asia
8	FW	(China) Zhan Yilin	20 September 1989 (aged 22)		(China) Shanghai East Asia
9	FW	(China) Wang Yunlong	22 February 1990 (aged 21)		(China) Shanghai East Asia
10	FW	(China) Chen Zijie	24 December 1989 (aged 21)		(China) Shanghai East Asia
11	DF	(China) Fu Huan	12 July 1993 (aged 18)		(China) Shanghai East Asia
12	FW	(China) Lü Wenjun	11 March 1989 (aged 22)		(China) Shanghai East Asia
13	FW	(China) Zhu Zhengrong	11 October 1988 (aged 23)		(China) Shanghai East Asia
16	DF	(China) Geng Jiaqi	1 July 1993 (aged 18)		(China) Shanghai East Asia
18	MF	(China) Sun Kai	26 March 1991 (aged 20)		(China) Shanghai East Asia
20	FW	(China) Mao Jiakang	17 January 1991 (aged 20)		(China) Shanghai East Asia
21	DF	(China) Wang Jiajie	15 November 1988 (aged 22)		(China) Shanghai East Asia
22	GK	(China) Sun Le	17 September 1989 (aged 22)		(China) Shanghai East Asia
23	DF	(China) Bai Jiajun	20 March 1991 (aged 20)		(China) Shanghai East Asia
25	MF	(China) Zhang Yudong	24 January 1989 (aged 22)		(China) Shanghai East Asia
26	DF	(China) Aidi	17 December 1990 (aged 20)		(China) Shanghai East Asia
27	DF	(China) Li Cheng	30 October 1988 (aged 23)		(China) Shanghai East Asia

=== Wofoo Tai Po ===
No.	Pos.	Player	Date of birth (age)	Caps	Club
1	GK	(Hong Kong) Li Hon Ho	14 July 1986 (aged 25)		(Hong Kong) Wofoo Tai Po
3	DF	(Hong Kong) Chan Sze Wing	23 March 1983 (aged 28)		(Hong Kong) Wofoo Tai Po
5	DF	(Brazil) Clayton	18 July 1988 (aged 23)		(Hong Kong) Wofoo Tai Po
7	FW	(Brazil) William Carlos	7 February 1987 (aged 24)		(Hong Kong) Wofoo Tai Po
8	MF	(Hong Kong) Li Chun Yip	18 September 1981 (aged 30)		(Hong Kong) Wofoo Tai Po
9	FW	(Hong Kong) Chen Liming	20 April 1987 (aged 24)		(Hong Kong) Wofoo Tai Po
10	MF	(Hong Kong) Lui Chi Hing	10 January 1984 (aged 27)		(Hong Kong) Wofoo Tai Po
11	MF	(Hong Kong) Sze Kin Wai	6 December 1984 (aged 26)		(Hong Kong) Wofoo Tai Po
13	MF	(Hong Kong) To Hon To	4 April 1989 (aged 22)		(Hong Kong) Wofoo Tai Po
14	DF	(Hong Kong) Kwok Wing Sun	11 September 1981 (aged 30)		(Hong Kong) Wofoo Tai Po
15	FW	(Ghana) Christian Annan	3 May 1978 (aged 33)		(Hong Kong) Wofoo Tai Po
20	DF	(Hong Kong) Cheung Chi Yung	30 June 1989 (aged 22)		(Hong Kong) Wofoo Tai Po
21	DF	(Hong Kong) Chan Yuk Chi	8 September 1984 (aged 27)		(Hong Kong) Wofoo Tai Po
23	FW	(Hong Kong) Ye Jia	1 December 1981 (aged 29)		(Hong Kong) Wofoo Tai Po
25	MF	(China) Che Runqiu	25 October 1990 (aged 21)		(Hong Kong) Wofoo Tai Po
26	MF	(China) Jing Teng	20 May 1990 (aged 21)		(Hong Kong) Wofoo Tai Po
27	MF	(Brazil) Ricardo Júnior	10 July 1988 (aged 23)		(Hong Kong) Wofoo Tai Po
33	GK	(Hong Kong) Pang Tsz Kin	16 December 1986 (aged 24)		(Hong Kong) Wofoo Tai Po

== Match details ==
=== First leg ===
5 November 2011
15:00 HKT

Wofoo Tai Po	2 – 3	Shanghai East Asia
Li Chun Yip 41'; Ye Jia 90'	(Report)	Wu Lei 15'; Lü Wenjun 27'; Sun Kai 55'

Mong Kok Stadium, Hong Kong
Attendance: 1,876
Referee: Ng Kai Lam

=== Second leg ===
12 November 2010
14:30 CST

Shanghai East Asia	7 - 1	Wofoo Tai Po
Lü Wenjun 10'; Wu Lei 13'; Zhu Zhengrong 25' 45'; Wang Jiajie 39'; Zhan Yilin 90' 90+1'	(Report) (in Chinese)	Ye Jia 72' (pen.)

Yuanshen Sports Centre Stadium, Shanghai
