= 2010 Hong Kong–Shanghai Inter Club Championship =

- Event: Hong Kong–Shanghai Inter Club Championship
Shanghai East Asia	Citizen
5	2

First leg
Shanghai East Asia	Citizen
4	1
- Date: 6 November 2010
- Venue: Yuanshen Sports Centre Stadium, Shanghai

Second leg
Citizen	Shanghai East Asia
2	1
- Date: 13 November 2010
- Venue: Siu Sai Wan Sports Ground, Hong Kong
- Attendance: 308

The 2010 Hong Kong–Shanghai Inter Club Championship was held on 6 November and 13 November 2010. The first leg was played at Yuanshen Sports Centre Stadium, Shanghai on 6 November, with the second leg taken place at Siu Sai Wan Sports Ground, Hong Kong on 13 November.

It was the first time in the competition history that it is held in a two-leg format.

== Squads ==
=== Citizen ===
No.	Pos.	Player	Date of birth (age)	Caps	Club
1	GK	(Hong Kong) Liu Fu Yuen	21 August 1990 (age 20)		(Hong Kong) Citizen
2	DF	(Hong Kong) Wong Yiu Fu	6 August 1981 (age 29)		(Hong Kong) Citizen
3	DF	(Hong Kong) Fung Kai Hong	25 January 1986 (age 24)		(Hong Kong) Citizen
5	DF	(Hong Kong) Chan Man Chun	10 August 1981 (age 29)		(Hong Kong) Citizen
6	MF	(Hong Kong) Yeung Chi Lun	20 November 1989 (age 20)		(Hong Kong) Citizen
7	DF	(Nigeria) Festus Baise	11 April 1980 (age 30)		(Hong Kong) Citizen
9	FW	(Brazil) Sandro	10 March 1987 (age 23)		(Hong Kong) Citizen
12	DF	(Hong Kong) Ma Ka Ki	8 June 1978 (age 32)		(Hong Kong) Citizen
13	MF	(Hong Kong) Cheung Kwok Ming	23 December 1990 (age 19)		(Hong Kong) Citizen
15	DF	(Ghana) Moses Mensah	10 August 1978 (age 32)		(Hong Kong) Citizen
16	MF	(Hong Kong) Tam Lok Hin	12 January 1991 (age 19)		(Hong Kong) Citizen
18	MF	(Hong Kong) Sham Kwok Keung	10 September 1985 (age 25)		(Hong Kong) Citizen
19	MF	(Brazil) Paulinho Piracicaba	16 January 1983 (age 27)		(Hong Kong) Citizen
20	MF	(Hong Kong) Tsang Chiu Tat	3 February 1989 (age 21)		(Hong Kong) Citizen
23	DF	(Brazil) Hélio	31 January 1986 (age 24)		(Hong Kong) Citizen
29	GK	(Hong Kong) Tse Tak Him	10 February 1985 (age 25)		(Hong Kong) Citizen
30	FW	(Brazil) Detinho	11 September 1973 (age 37)		(Hong Kong) Citizen
32	DF	(Hong Kong) Sham Kwok Fai	30 May 1984 (age 26)		(Hong Kong) Citizen

=== Shanghai East Asia ===
- Chairman: Xu Genbao
- Team manager: Yang Limin
- Head coach: Fan Zhiyi
- Coaches: Qiu Jingwei, Jia Chunhua, Wang Zhongchun
- Assistant coaches: Jiang Yong, Cheng Jianhua
- Physio: Sun Guozhu

No.	Pos.	Player	Date of birth (age)	Caps	Club
1	GK	(China) Yan Junling	28 January 1991 (age 19)		(China) Shanghai East Asia
3	DF	(China) Zheng Kaimu	28 January 1992 (age 18)		(China) Shanghai East Asia
4	DF	(China) Wang Shenchao	8 February 1989 (age 19)		(China) Shanghai East Asia
5	MF	(China) Wang Jiayu	28 September 1990 (age 20)		(China) Shanghai East Asia
6	MF	(China) Cai Huikang	10 October 1989 (age 21)		(China) Shanghai East Asia
7	FW	(China) Wu Lei	11 September 1991 (age 19)		(China) Shanghai East Asia
8	MF	(China) Cao Yunding	22 November 1989 (age 20)		(China) Shanghai East Asia
10	FW	(China) Mao Jiakang	17 January 1991 (age 19)		(China) Shanghai East Asia
11	MF	(China) Jiang Chipeng	6 March 1989 (age 21)		(China) Shanghai East Asia
12	DF	(China) Fu Huan	12 July 1993 (age 17)		(China) Shanghai East Asia
15	DF	(China) Lu Haidong	11 January 1992 (age 18)		(China) Shanghai East Asia
18	MF	(China) Sun Kai	26 March 1991 (age 19)		(China) Shanghai East Asia
21	DF	(China) Geng Jiaqi	15 November 1988 (age 21)		(China) Shanghai East Asia
22	GK	(China) Sun Le	17 September 1989 (age 21)		(China) Shanghai East Asia
23	DF	(China) Bai Jiajun	20 March 1991 (age 19)		(China) Shanghai East Asia
25	MF	(China) Zhang Yudong	24 January 1989 (age 21)		(China) Shanghai East Asia
26	DF	(China) Aidi	17 December 1990 (age 19)		(China) Shanghai East Asia
27	DF	(China) Li Cheng	30 October 1988 (age 22)		(China) Shanghai East Asia

== Match details ==
=== First leg ===
6 November 2010
19:45 CST

Shanghai East Asia	4 – 1	Citizen
Cao Yunding 47'; Aidi 49' 87'; Wu Lei 67'	(Report) (in Chinese)	Sham Kwok Fai 90+1'

Yuanshen Sports Centre Stadium, Shanghai
Attendance: -
Referee: -

=== Second leg ===
13 November 2010
16:00 HKT

Citizen	2 – 1	Shanghai East Asia
Paulinho Piracicaba 8' 40'	(Match Stat.) (Report) (in Chinese)	Cao Yunding 28'

Siu Sai Wan Sports Ground, Hong Kong
Attendance: 308
Referee: -
