= 2012 Hong Kong–Shanghai Inter Club Championship =

- Event: Hong Kong–Shanghai Inter Club Championship
Kitchee	Shanghai Tellace
2	7

First leg
Kitchee	Shanghai Tellace
0	4
- Date: 1 November 2012
- Venue: Tseung Kwan O Sports Ground, Hong Kong
- Referee: Tong Kui Sum (Hong Kong)
- Attendance: 737
- Weather: Partly cloudy 22 °C (72 °F); 70% humidity

Second leg
Shanghai Tellace	Kitchee
3	2
- Date: 10 November 2012
- Venue: Yuanshen Sports Centre Stadium, Shanghai
- Weather: Partly cloudy 17 °C (63 °F); 82% humidity

The 2012 Hong Kong–Shanghai Inter Club Championship was held on 1 November and 10 November 2012. The first leg will be played at Tseung Kwan O Sports Ground, Tseung Kwan O, Hong Kong, with the second leg taken place at Yuanshen Sports Centre Stadium, Shanghai. Current defending champions of Hong Kong First Division League Kitchee was selected to represent Hong Kong while Chinese League One champions Shanghai Tellace represents Shanghai.

Kitchee suffered a 4–0 defeat at home and they failed to make a win in Shanghai as they lost 2–3. Shanghai Tellace is the champions of 2012 Hong Kong–Shanghai Inter Club Championship.

== Squads ==
=== Kitchee ===
No.	Pos.	Player	Date of birth (age)	Caps	Club
1	GK	(Hong Kong) Wang Zhenpeng	5 May 1984 (aged 28)		(Hong Kong) Kitchee
2	DF	(Spain) Fernando Recio	17 December 1982 (aged 29)		(Hong Kong) Kitchee
3	DF	(Spain) Dani Cancela	23 September 1981 (aged 31)		(Hong Kong) Kitchee
5	DF	(Pakistan) Zesh Rehman	14 October 1983 (aged 29)		(Hong Kong) Kitchee
6	MF	(Hong Kong) Gao Wen	18 January 1985 (aged 27)		(Hong Kong) Kitchee
7	MF	(Hong Kong) Chu Siu Kei	11 January 1980 (aged 32)		(Hong Kong) Kitchee
8	FW	(Spain) Pablo Couñago	9 August 1979 (aged 33)		(Hong Kong) Kitchee
9	FW	(China) Liang Zicheng	18 March 1982 (aged 30)		(Hong Kong) Kitchee
10	MF	(Hong Kong) Lam Ka Wai	5 June 1985 (aged 27)		(Hong Kong) Kitchee
11	FW	(Spain) Yago González	6 November 1979 (aged 32)		(Hong Kong) Kitchee
12	DF	(Hong Kong) Lo Kwan Yee	9 October 1984 (aged 28)		(Hong Kong) Kitchee
13	FW	(Hong Kong) Chan Man Fai	19 June 1988 (aged 24)		(Hong Kong) Kitchee
14	DF	(Hong Kong) Liu Quankun	17 February 1983 (aged 29)		(Hong Kong) Kitchee
15	MF	(Hong Kong) James Ha	26 December 1992 (aged 19)		(Hong Kong) Kitchee
16	DF	(Hong Kong) Tsang Chi Hau	12 January 1990 (aged 22)		(Hong Kong) Kitchee
18	FW	(Spain) Jordi Tarrés	16 March 1981 (aged 31)		(Hong Kong) Kitchee
19	MF	(Hong Kong) Huang Yang	30 October 1983 (aged 29)		(Hong Kong) Kitchee
21	DF	(Hong Kong) Tsang Kam To	21 June 1989 (aged 23)		(Hong Kong) Kitchee
23	GK	(China) Guo Jianqiao	20 July 1983 (aged 29)		(Hong Kong) Kitchee
27	DF	(New Zealand) Shay Spitz	27 January 1988 (aged 24)		(Hong Kong) Kitchee
28	FW	(Hong Kong) Cheng Siu Wai	27 December 1981 (aged 30)		(Hong Kong) Kitchee

=== Shanghai Tellace ===
No.	Pos.	Player	Date of birth (age)	Caps	Club
1	GK	(China) Yan Junling	28 January 1991 (aged 21)		(China) Shanghai Tellace
2	DF	(China) Li Yunqiu	3 October 1990 (aged 22)		(China) Shanghai Tellace
4	DF	(China) Wang Shenchao	8 February 1989 (aged 23)		(China) Shanghai Tellace
5	DF	(China) Wang Jiajie	15 November 1988 (aged 23)		(China) Shanghai Tellace
6	MF	(China) Cai Huikang	10 October 1989 (aged 23)		(China) Shanghai Tellace
7	FW	(China) Wu Lei	19 November 1991 (aged 20)		(China) Shanghai Tellace
8	FW	(China) Zhan Yilin	20 September 1989 (aged 23)		(China) Shanghai Tellace
12	FW	(China) Lü Wenjun	11 March 1989 (aged 23)		(China) Shanghai Tellace
13	FW	(China) Zhu Zhengrong	11 October 1988 (aged 24)		(China) Shanghai Tellace
15	DF	(China) Li Cheng	30 October 1988 (aged 24)		(China) Shanghai Tellace
16	DF	(China) Geng Jiaqi	1 July 1993 (aged 19)		(China) Shanghai Tellace
18	MF	(China) Li Jiawei	1 July 1997 (aged 15)		(China) Shanghai Tellace
18	MF	(China) Sun Kai	26 March 1991 (aged 21)		(China) Shanghai Tellace
20	FW	(China) Mao Jiakang	27 January 1991 (aged 21)		(China) Shanghai Tellace
39	FW	(China) Lin Chuangyi	15 January 1993 (aged 19)		(China) Shanghai Tellace
43	FW	(China) Sun Jungang	27 January 1997 (aged 15)		(China) Shanghai Tellace

== Match details ==
=== First leg ===
1 November 2011
20:00 GMT+8

Kitchee	0 – 4	Shanghai Tellace
	Report	28', 35', 51' Mao Jiakang; 73' Geng Jiaqi

Tseung Kwan O Sports Ground, Hong Kong
Attendance: 737
Referee: Tong Kui Sum (Hong Kong)

=== Second leg ===
10 November 2012
15:00 CST

Shanghai Tellace	3 – 2	Kitchee
Wu Lei 8'; Geng Jiaqi 61'; Lin Chuangyi 69'		45' Chan Man Fai; 89' Couñago

Yuanshen Sports Centre Stadium, Shanghai
