= 2013–14 Yuen Long FC season =

I-Sky Yuen Long
2013–14 season
- Chairman: Wong Wai Shun
- Head coach: Chan Ho Yin
- Home Ground: Yuen Long Stadium (Capacity: 4,932)
- First Division: 5th (alphabetically)
- Senior Shield: TBD
- FA Cup: TBD
Home colours	Away colours

The 2013–14 season is Yuen Long District SA's 20th season in the Hong Kong First Division League, as well as their debut season after their promotion to the top-tier division in 2012–13 season. Yuen Long will compete in the First Division League, as well as to fight for victory in Senior Challenge Shield and FA Cup.

Starting from this season, the club is renamed as I-Sky Yuen Long due to sponsorship reasons.

== Key events ==
- 30 May 2013: Hong Kong midfielder Cheng King Ho joins the club from fellow First Division club Biu Chun Rangers for free.
- 31 May 2013: Brazilian midfielder Gustavo Claudio da Silva joins the club from fellow First Division club Citizen for free.
- 31 May 2013: Brazilian striker Sandro joins the club from fellow First Division club Citizen for free.
- 3 June 2013: Montenegrin defender Čedomir Mijanović joins the club from fellow First Division club Yokohama FC Hong Kong for free.
- 3 June 2013: Hong Kong defender Chueng Chi Yung joins the club from fellow First Division club Sunray Cave JC Sun Hei for free.
- 3 June 2013: Hong Kong defender Yuen Tsun Nam joins the club on loan from fellow First Division club Sunray Cave JC Sun Hei until the end of the season.
- 3 June 2013: Hong Kong midfielder Chow Ki joins the club from fellow First Division club Sun Pegasus Reserves for free.
- 3 June 2013: Hong Kong international defender Chiu Chun Kit joins the club from fellow First Division club Citizen on loan until the end of the season.
- 3 June 2013: Hong Kong goalkeeper Liu Fu Yuen joins the club from fellow First Division club Citizen for free.
- 16 June 2013: Hong Kong midfielder Cheung Yu Sum joins the club from fellow First Division club Citizen for free.
- 17 June 2013: Hong Kong midfielder Fung Kai Hong joins the club from fellow First Division club Sun Pegasus for free.
- 17 June 2013: Unattached Brazilian midfielder Wellingsson de Souza joins the club for free.
- 18 September 2013: Brazilian midfielder Rian Marques joins the club from fellow First Division club Biu Chun Rangers for an undisclosed fee.
- 20 January 2014: Japanese midfielder Yuki Fujimoto joins the club on a free transfer.
- 29 January 2014: Hong Kong goalkeeper Pang Tsz Kin joins the club from fellow First Division club Happy Valley for an undisclosed fee.

== Players ==
=== Squad information ===
N	P	Nat.	Name	Date of birth	Age	Since	Previous club	Notes
1	GK	(Hong Kong)	Liu Fu Yuen^{LP}	21 August 1990	23	2013	(Hong Kong) Citizen	
3	MF	(Hong Kong)	Fung Kai Hong^{LP}	25 January 1986	28	2013	(Hong Kong) Sun Pegasus	
4	DF	(Hong Kong)	Lau Ka Ming^{LP}	31 December 1993	20	2013	(Hong Kong) Kwai Tsing	
5	MF	(Brazil)	Gustavo Claudio da Silva^{FP}	20 August 1988	25	2013	(Hong Kong) Citizen	
6	DF	(Hong Kong)	Cheung Tsz Kin^{LP}	26 March 1983	31	2012	(Hong Kong) Happy Valley	
7	MF	(Hong Kong)	Cheng King Ho^{LP}	17 November 1989	24	2013	(Hong Kong) Biu Chun Rangers	
8	MF	(Hong Kong)	Fong Yan Chak^{LP}	8 April 1993	21	2013	(Sweden) IFK Stockyard	
9	FW	(Brazil)	Sandro^{FP}	10 March 1987	27	2013	(Hong Kong) Citizen	
10	FW	(Hong Kong)	Yu Ho Pong^{LP}	19 August 1989	24	2011	(Hong Kong) Sunray Cave JC Sun Hei	
11	MF	(Brazil)	Wellingsson de Souza^{FP}	7 September 1989	24	2013	Free agent	
12	DF	(China)	Yan Minghao^{LP}	15 March 1985	29	2012	(Hong Kong) Kam Fung	Second nationality: Hong Kong
14	MF	(Hong Kong)	Chan Ka Chun^{LP}	16 August 1988	25	2011	(Hong Kong) Kitchee	
15	FW	(Hong Kong)	Hui Wang Fung^{LP}	4 February 1994	20	2013	Yokohama FC Hong Kong	
16	MF	(Hong Kong)	Cheung Yu Sum^{LP}	7 September 1992	21	2013	(Hong Kong) Citizen	
17	DF	(Hong Kong)	Yan Wai Hong^{LP}	17 May 1990	24	2012	(Hong Kong) Sunray Cave JC Sun Hei	
18	MF	(Hong Kong)	Chow Ki^{LP}	12 June 1994	20	2013	(Hong Kong) Sun Pegasus	
20	FW	(Hong Kong)	Yuen Lap Cheung^{LP}	1 March 1987	27	2012	(Hong Kong) Tuen Mun	
21	DF	(Hong Kong)	Cheung Chi Yung^{LP}	30 June 1989	24	2013	(Hong Kong) Sunray Cave JC Sun Hei	
22	FW	(Brazil)	Fábio Lopes Alcântara^{FP}	24 March 1977	37	2012	(Hong Kong) Kam Fung	Team captain
23	GK	(Hong Kong)	Ng Kwok Hei^{LP}	23 July 1985	28	2012	(Hong Kong) Sham Shui Po	
24	MF	(Japan)	Yuki Fujitomo^{AP}	5 May 1986	28	2014 (Winter)	Free agent	
27	GK	(Hong Kong)	Chung Wai Ho^{LP}	17 November 1990	23	2013	(Hong Kong) On Good	
28	DF	(Hong Kong)	Chiu Chun Kit^{LP}	4 October 1983	30	2013	(Hong Kong) Citizen	On loan from Citizen
30	GK	(Hong Kong)	Pang Tsz Kin^{LP}	16 December 1986	27	2014 (Winter)	(Hong Kong) Happy Valley	
31	MF	(Brazil)	Rian Marques^{FP}	28 August 1982	31	2013	(Hong Kong) Biu Chun Rangers	
33	DF	(Montenegro)	Čedomir Mijanović^{FP}	17 January 1980	33	2013	Yokohama FC Hong Kong	

As of 29 January 2014

Source: Yuen Long District FC
Ordered by squad number.
^{LP}Local player; ^{FP}Foreign player; ^{AP}Asian player; ^{NR}Non-registered player.

=== Transfers ===
==== In ====
#	Position	Player	Transferred from	Fee	Date	Team	Source
7	MF	(Hong Kong) Cheng King Ho	(Hong Kong) Biu Chun Ranger	Free transfer	30 May 2013	First team	
5	MF	(Brazil) Gustavo Claudio da Silva	(Hong Kong) Citizen	Free transfer	31 May 2013	First team	
9	FW	(Brazil) Sandro	(Hong Kong) Citizen	Free transfer	31 May 2013	First team	
33	DF	(Montenegro) Čedomir Mijanović	Yokohama FC Hong Kong	Free transfer	3 June 2013	First team	
21	DF	(Hong Kong) Cheung Chi Yung	(Hong Kong) Sunray Cave JC Sun Hei	Free transfer	3 June 2013	First team	
18	MF	(Hong Kong) Chow Ki	(Hong Kong) Sun Pegasus	Free transfer	3 June 2013	First team	
1	GK	(Hong Kong) Liu Fu Yuen	(Hong Kong) Citizen	Free transfer	3 June 2013	First team	
16	MF	(Hong Kong) Cheung Yu Sum	(Hong Kong) Citizen	Free transfer	16 June 2013	First team	
3	MF	(Hong Kong) Fung Kai Hong	(Hong Kong) Sun Pegasus	Free transfer	17 June 2013	First team	
11	MF	(Brazil) Wellingsson de Souza	Free agent	Free transfer	17 June 2013	First team	
31	MF	(Brazil) Rian Marques	(Hong Kong) Biu Chun Rangers	Undisclosed	18 September 2013	First team	
24	MF	(Japan) Yuki Fujitomo	Free agent	Free transfer	20 January 2014	First team	
30	GK	(Hong Kong) Pang Tsz Kin	(Hong Kong) Happy Valley	Undisclosed	29 January 2014	First team	

==== Out ====
#	Position	Player	Transferred to	Fee	Date	Team	Source
2	DF	(Hong Kong) Law Wing Lun	Unattached (Released)	Free transfer	1 July 2013	First team	
5	MF	(Hong Kong) Ngai Pok Keung	Unattached (Released)	Free transfer	1 July 2013	First team	
9	MF	(Hong Kong) Yip Chi Ho	Unattached (Released)	Free transfer	1 July 2013	First team	
11	MF	(Hong Kong) Hon Shing	Unattached (Released)	Free transfer	1 July 2013	First team	
15	MF	(Hong Kong) Lau Chi Keung	Unattached (Released)	Free transfer	1 July 2013	First team	
17	FW	(Hong Kong) Yick Chi Ho	Unattached (Released)	Free transfer	1 July 2013	First team	
18	DF	(Hong Kong) Wu Haopeng	Unattached (Released)	Free transfer	1 July 2013	First team	
19	MF	(Hong Kong) Chan Hon Hing	Unattached (Released)	Free transfer	1 July 2013	First team	
21	DF	(Hong Kong) Hau Hing Yu	Unattached (Released)	Free transfer	1 July 2013	First team	
23	MF	(Ghana) Yaw Anane	Unattached (Released)	Free transfer	1 July 2013	First team	
24	DF	(Cameroon) Celistanus Tita Chou	Unattached (Released)	Free transfer	1 July 2013	First team	
26	GK	(Hong Kong) Tung Ho Yin	Unattached (Released)	Free transfer	1 July 2013	First team	

==== Loan In ====
Squad #	Position	Player	Loaned from	Date	Loan expires	Team	Source
28	DF	(Hong Kong) Chiu Chun Kit	(Hong Kong) Citizen	3 June 2013	End of the season	First team	

==== Loan out ====
#	Position	Player	Loaned to	Date	Loan expires	Team	Source

== Club ==
=== Coaching staff ===
Position	Staff
Head Coach	(Hong Kong) Chan Ho Yin
Assistant Coach	(Brazil) Fábio Lopes Alcântara
Assistant Coach	(Hong Kong) Chiu Chun Kit
Assistant Coach	(Hong Kong) Cheung Tsz Kin
Goalkeeper Coach	(Hong Kong) Leung Cheuk Cheung

Last updated: 16 July 2012
Source: Yuen Long Football Club

== Squad statistics ==
=== Overall Stats ===
	First Division	Senior Shield	FA Cup	Total Stats
Games played	0	0	0	0
Games won	0	0	0	0
Games drawn	0	0	0	0
Games lost	0	0	0	0
Goals for	0	0	0	0
Goals against	0	0	0	0
Players used	0	0	0	0^{1}
Yellow cards	0	0	0	0
Red cards	0	0	0	0

Last updated: 5 May 2013
Source: Player Stats

Players Used: Yuen Long has used a total of 0 different players in all competitions.

=== Squad Stats ===
				Total				Hong Kong First Division League		Senior Challenge Shield		FA Cup		
N	Pos.	Name	Nat.	GS	App	Gls	Min	App	Gls	App	Gls	App	Gls	Notes
1	GK	Liu Fu Yuen	(Hong Kong)											(−) GA
23	GK	Ng Kwok Hei	(Hong Kong)											(−) GA
27	GK	Chung Wai Ho	(Hong Kong)											(−) GA
30	GK	Pang Tsz Kin	(Hong Kong)											(−) GA
4	DF	Lau Ka Ming	(Hong Kong)											
6	DF	Cheung Tsz Kin	(Hong Kong)											
12	DF	Yan Minghao	(China)											
17	DF	Yan Wai Hong	(Hong Kong)											
21	DF	Cheung Chi Yung	(Hong Kong)											
28	DF	Chiu Chun Kit	(Hong Kong)											
33	DF	Čedomir Mijanović	(Montenegro)											
3	MF	Fung Kai Hong	(Hong Kong)											
5	MF	Gustavo	(Brazil)											
7	MF	Cheng King Ho	(Hong Kong)											
8	MF	Fong Yan Chak	(Hong Kong)											
11	MF	Wellingsson de Souza	(Brazil)											
14	MF	Chan Ka Chun	(Hong Kong)											
16	MF	Cheung Yu Sum	(Hong Kong)											
18	MF	Chow Ki	(Hong Kong)											
24	MF	Yuki Fujitomo	(Japan)											
31	MF	Rian Marques	(Brazil)											
9	FW	Sandro	(Brazil)											
10	FW	Yu Ho Pong	(Hong Kong)											
15	FW	Hui Wang Fung	(Hong Kong)											
20	FW	Yuen Lap Cheung	(Hong Kong)											
22	FW	Fábio Lopes Alcântara	(Brazil)											

Last updated: 15 December 2013
Ordered by Position
0 shown as blank

=== Top scorers ===
Place	Position	Nationality	Number	Name	First Division	Senior Shield	FA Cup	Total
TOTALS					0	0	0	0

=== Disciplinary record ===
Includes all competitive matches. Players listed below made at least one appearance for I-Sky Yuen Long first squad during the season.

N	P	Nat.	Name	League			Shield			FA Cup			Total			Notes
N	P	Nat.	Name	Yellow card	Second yellow card	Red card	Yellow card	Second yellow card	Red card	Yellow card	Second yellow card	Red card	Yellow card	Second yellow card	Red card	Notes

Last updated: 8 February 2014
Source: Competitive matches
Ordered by (red card) , (second yellow card) and (yellow card)
(yellow card) = Number of bookings; (second yellow card) = Number of sending offs after a second yellow card; (red card) = Number of sending offs by a direct red card.

=== Substitution Record ===
Includes all competitive matches.

			League		Shield		FA Cup		Total	
No.	Pos	Name	subson	subsoff	subson	subsoff	subson	subsoff	subson	subsoff
Goalkeepers
1	GK	Liu Fu Yuen	0	0	0	0	0	0	0	0
23	GK	Ng Kwok Hei	0	0	0	0	0	0	0	0
27	GK	Chung Wai Ho	0	0	0	0	0	0	0	0
30	GK	Pang Tsz Kin	0	0	0	0	0	0	0	0
Defenders
4	DF	Lau Ka Ming	0	0	0	0	0	0	0	0
6	DF	Cheung Tsz Kin	0	0	0	0	0	0	0	0
12	DF	Yan Minghao	0	0	0	0	0	0	0	0
17	DF	Yan Wai Hong	0	0	0	0	0	0	0	0
21	DF	Cheung Chi Yung	0	0	0	0	0	0	0	0
28	DF	Chiu Chun Kit	0	0	0	0	0	0	0	0
33	DF	Čedomir Mijanović	0	0	0	0	0	0	0	0
Midfielders
3	MF	Fung Kai Hong	0	0	0	0	0	0	0	0
5	MF	Gustavo	0	0	0	0	0	0	0	0
7	MF	Cheng King Ho	0	0	0	0	0	0	0	0
8	MF	Fong Yan Chak	0	0	0	0	0	0	0	0
11	MF	Wellingsson de Souza	0	0	0	0	0	0	0	0
14	MF	Chan Ka Chun	0	0	0	0	0	0	0	0
16	MF	Cheung Yu Sum	0	0	0	0	0	0	0	0
18	MF	Chow Ki	0	0	0	0	0	0	0	0
24	MF	Yuki Fujitomo	0	0	0	0	0	0	0	0
31	MF	Rian Marques	0	0	0	0	0	0	0	0
Forwards
9	FW	Sandro	0	0	0	0	0	0	0	0
10	FW	Yu Ho Pong	0	0	0	0	0	0	0	0
15	FW	Hui Wang Fung	0	0	0	0	0	0	0	0
20	FW	Yuen Lap Cheung	0	0	0	0	0	0	0	0
22	FW	Fábio Lopes Alcântara	0	0	0	0	0	0	0	0

Last updated: 15 December 2013

=== Captains ===
No.	P	Name	Country	No. games	Notes

Last updated: (Once the season commences)
Source: Competitive match reports.
Competitive matches only
Matches started as captain only
Country: FIFA nationality; No.: Squad number; P: Position; Name: Player name; No. Games: Number of games started as captain.

== Competitions ==
=== Overall ===
Competition	Started round	Current position / round	Final position / round	First match	Last match
Hong Kong First Division League	—	5th		31 August 2013	
Senior Challenge Shield	Quarter-finals	—		October 2013	
FA Cup	Quarter-finals	—		January 2014	

Updated to match played 13 August 2013
Source: Competitions

=== First Division League ===
==== Classification ====
Pos	Team	Pld	W	D	L	GF	GA	GD	Pts	Qualification or relegation
5	Hong Kong Rangers	18	5	6	7	23	32	−9	21	
6	Eastern Salon	18	5	6	7	34	37	−3	21	2013–14 Hong Kong season play-off (Note: Eastern Salon qualified for the 2013–14 Hong Kong season play-off as winners of the 2013–14 Hong Kong FA Cup.)
7	I-Sky Yuen Long	18	5	5	8	25	33	−8	20	
8	Sunray Cave JC Sun Hei (R)	18	5	4	9	32	41	−9	19	Relegation to 2014–15 Hong Kong First Division League (Note: Sunray Cave JC Sun Hei & Citizen declined to participate in the 2014–15 Hong Kong Premier League and would self-relegate in the following season.)
9	Citizen (R)	18	4	6	8	25	33	−8	18	Relegation to 2014–15 Hong Kong First Division League

Updated to match(es) played on 11 May 2014. Source: Hong Kong Football Association
Rules for classification: 1) points; 2) head-to-head points; 3) head-to-head goal difference; 4) head-to-head goals scored; 5) goal difference; 6) number of goals scored.
(R) Relegated

==== Results summary ====
Overall								Home						Away					
Pld	W	D	L	GF	GA	GD	Pts	W	D	L	GF	GA	GD	W	D	L	GF	GA	GD
0	0	0	0	0	0	0	0	0	0	0	0	0	0	0	0	0	0	0	0

Last updated: 5 May 2013.
Source: First Division

==== Results by round ====
Round	1	2	3	4	6	7	10	8	9	5	11	12	13	14	15	16	17	18	19	20	21	22
Ground	H	H	A	H	A	H	H	H	A	H	A	H	A	A	H	A	A	H	A	H	A	A
Result	D																					
Position																						

Updated to match(es) played on 21 August 2013. Source: Competitive Matches
A = Away; H = Home; W = Win; D = Draw; L = Loss; V = Voided

== Matches ==
Win Draw Loss Void

=== Pre-season friendlies ===
23 July 2013	I-Sky Yuen Long (Hong Kong)	4 – 1	Hong Kong U19	Wong Tai Sin, Kowloon
	Yuen Lap Cheung; Souza		Goal	Stadium: Po Kong Village Road Park

30 July 2013	I-Sky Yuen Long (Hong Kong)	4 – 1	(Hong Kong) Wofoo Tai Po	Tuen Mun, New Territories
20:00 UTC+8	Sandro; Yuen Lap Cheung; Souza; Chow Ki		Ye Jia	Stadium: Wu Shan Recreation Playground

2 August 2013	I-Sky Yuen Long (Hong Kong)	1 – 1	(Hong Kong) Citizen	Tsing Yi, New Territories
16:30 UTC+8	Cheung Chi Yung		Hélio	Stadium: Tsing Yi Northeast Park

7 August 2013	I-Sky Yuen Long (Hong Kong)	1 – 1	Hong Kong FC	Happy Valley, Hong Kong Island
15:30 UTC+8	Fábio		Goal	Stadium: HKFC Ground

9 August 2013	I-Sky Yuen Long (Hong Kong)	0 – 1	(Hong Kong) Royal Southern	Tsing Yi, New Territories
16:30 UTC+8			Ip Chung Long	Stadium: Tsing Yi Northeast Park

19 August 2013	Wofoo Tai Po (Hong Kong)	–	(Hong Kong) I-Sky Yuen Long	Tai Po, New Territories
20:00 UTC+8				Stadium: Kwong Fuk Park

=== First Division League ===
31 August 2013 Round 1	I-Sky Yuen Long	2 – 2	Biu Chun Rangers	Yuen Long, New Territories
14:30 UTC+8	Souza 31', 57'; Cheng King Ho (yellow card) 16'; Fabio Lopes (yellow card) 19' (red card) 20'	Report	Marques 3'; Chuck Yiu Kwok 32'; Chow Cheuk Fung (yellow card) 54'; Chan Ming Kong (yellow card) 71'	Stadium: Yuen Long Stadium (Capacity: 4,932); Attendance: 1,053; Referee: Ho Wai Sing; Assistant referees: Chow Chun Kit, Lau Fong Hei; Fourth official: Chan Ming Siu

15 September 2013 Round 2	I-Sky Yuen Long	0 – 1	Royal Southern	Yuen Long, New Territories
17:30 UTC+8	Gustavo (yellow card) 57'; Fung Kai Hong (yellow card) 82'; Sandro (yellow card) 90+3'; Souza (yellow card) 90+4'	Report	(yellow card) 5' Chung Hon Chee; (yellow card) 61' Yago; (yellow card) 72' Héctor; (yellow card) 77' Che Runqiu; 90' Carril; (yellow card) 90+4' Ngan Lok Fung	Stadium: Yuen Long Stadium (Capacity: 4,932); Attendance: 1,004; Referee: Chan Shui Hung; Assistant referees: Cheng Oi Cho, Chan Siu Ming; Fourth official: Fok Pong Shing

22 September 2013 Round 3	Tuen Mun	Postponed (Note: The match originally kicks off on 22 September 2013. Due to typhoon, the match was cancelled and postponed. It has been scheduled to play at 20:00 on 26 February 2014.)	I-Sky Yuen Long	Tuen Mun, New Territories
14:30 UTC+8				Stadium: Tuen Mun Tang Shiu Kin Sports Ground (Capacity: 2,200)

29 September 2013 Round 4	I-Sky Yuen Long	2 – 2 (Voided)	Happy Valley	Yuen Long, New Territories
17:30 UTC+8	Cheung Tsz Kin (yellow card) 52'; Mijanović 78'; Hui Wang Fung 90+3'	Report	29' Acosta; 63' (o.g.) Mijanović; (yellow card) 89' Li Chun Yip	Stadium: Yuen Long Stadium (Capacity: 4,932); Attendance: 872; Referee: Ho Wai Sing; Assistant referees: Yu Chun Sun, Luk Kin Sun; Fourth official: Ng Kai Lam

5 October 2013 Round 5	South China	2 – 2	I-Sky Yuen Long	So Kon Po, Kowloon
17:30 UTC+8	Cheng Lai Hin 49'; Dhiego 57'	Report	(yellow card) 40' Gustavo; 68' (yellow card) 69' Sandro; 90+1' (yellow card) 90+5' Marques; (yellow card) 90+4' Souza	Stadium: Hong Kong Stadium (Capacity: 40,000); Attendance: 1,402; Referee: Liu Kwok Man; Assistant referees: Ng Kai Lam, Sarao Amarjit Singh; Fourth official: Yu Chun Sun

13 October 2013 Round 5R (Note: The match originally kicks off on 22 September 2013. Due to typhoon, the match was cancelled and postponed. It has been scheduled to play at 14:30 on 13 October 2013.)	Tuen Mun	0 – 1 (Voided)	I-Sky Yuen Long	Tuen Mun, Hong Kong Island
14:30 UTC+8	Tsang Chiu Tat (yellow card) 6'	Report	(yellow card) 59' Mijanović; 89' Sandro	Stadium: Tuen Mun Tang Shiu Kin Sports Ground (Capacity: 2,200); Attendance: 679

20 October 2013 Round 6	I-Sky Yuen Long	1 – 2	Eastern Salon	Yuen Long, New Territories
17:30 UTC+8	Sandro 51'; Souza (yellow card) 69'	Report	1' Itaparica; 21' Giovane; (yellow card) 87' Diego	Stadium: Yuen Long Stadium (Capacity: 4,932); Attendance: 1,107; Referee: Ng Kai Lam; Assistant referees: Yu Chun Sun, Yu Kin Fung; Fourth official: Lui Siu Chuen

26 October 2013 Round 7	I-Sky Yuen Long	3 – 1	Sunray Cave JC Sun Hei	Yuen Long, New Territories
17:30 UTC+8	Souza 13', 60'; Fábio 86'	Report	(yellow card) 33' James Ha; 70' Kilama	Stadium: Yuen Long Stadium (Capacity: 4,932); Attendance: 849; Referee: Ho Wai Sing; Assistant referees: Lui Siu Chuen, Luk Kin Sun; Fourth official: Yu Chun Sun

23 November 2013 Round 10	I-Sky Yuen Long	0 – 2	Kitchee	Yuen Long, New Territories
17:30 UTC+8	Hui Wang Fung (yellow card) 21'; Marques (yellow card) 43'; Souza (yellow card) 68'	Report	(yellow card) 11' Jordi; (yellow card) 15' Matt Lam; (yellow card) 60' Wang Zhenpeng; 79', 85' Belencoso	Stadium: Yuen Long Stadium (Capacity: 4,932); Attendance: 1,325; Referee: Ng Chiu Kok; Assistant referees: Yu Chun Sun, Lam Chi Ho; Fourth official: Lo Yuk Ming

30 November 2013 Round 8	Citizen	2 – 1	I-Sky Yuen Long	Tsing Yi, New Territories
17:30 UTC+8	Stefan 42'; Detinho 84'	Report	89' Cheung Chi Kin; (yellow card) 90+3' Lau Ka Ming	Stadium: Tsing Yi Sports Ground (Capacity: 1,500); Attendance: 313; Referee: Lau Fong Hei; Assistant referees: Yu Chun Sun, Tang Hing Fu; Fourth official: Cheng Oi Cho

14 December 2013 Round 9	I-Sky Yuen Long	1 – 4	Sun Pegasus	Yuen Long, New Territories
17:30 UTC+8	Sandro (yellow card) 26'; Cheung Chi Kin (yellow card) 70'; Souza 76'	Report	27' (yellow card) 58' Ranđelović; (yellow card) 44' Mbome; 51' (pen.), 63' Raščić; (yellow card) 57' Miović; 90+4' McKee	Stadium: Yuen Long Stadium (Capacity: 4,932); Attendance: 1,056; Referee: Luk Kin Sun; Assistant referees: Yu Chun Sun, Chan Ming Siu; Fourth official: Ng Kai Lam

24 January 2014 Round 11	Yokohama FC Hong Kong	2 – 1	I-Sky Yuen Long	Tseung Kwan O, New Territories
20:00 UTC+8	Harada 8' (yellow card) 70'; Fong Pak Lun (yellow card) 29'; Fukuda 77'	Report	(yellow card) 55' Chan Ka Chun; (yellow card) 65' Fábio; 68' Souza; (yellow card) 71' Gustavo	Stadium: Tseung Kwan O Sports Ground (Capacity: 3,500); Attendance: 301; Referee: Ng Kai Lam; Assistant referees: Cheng Oi Cho, Yau Tsz Yeung; Fourth official: Lam Nai Kei

9 February 2013 Round 12	I-Sky Yuen Long	3 – 1	Yokohama FC Hong Kong	Yuen Long, New Territories
17:30 UTC+8	Yuen Lap Cheung (yellow card) 33'; Souza (yellow card) 41' (goal) 90+4'; Marques (yellow card) 58'; Chiu Chun Kit (yellow card) 59'; Sandro 81' (pen.); Gustavo (yellow card) 86'; Cheung Tsz Kin (yellow card) 87'	Report	31' Leung Nok Hang; (yellow card) 43' Tan Chun Lok; (yellow card) 58' Yoshitake; (yellow card) 80' Park Tae-Hong	Stadium: Yuen Long Stadium (Capacity: 4,932); Attendance: 463; Referee: Ho Wai Sing; Assistant referees: Chan Ming Siu, Yu Kin Fung; Fourth official: Mok Kar Main

16 February 2014 Round 13	Sunray Cave JC Sun Hei	3 – 3	I-Sky Yuen Long	Tsing Yi, New Territories
17:30 UTC+8	Kilama (yellow card) 5' (goal) 79'; Roberto (yellow card) 21'; Bouet 86'; Reinaldo (yellow card) 90'; Cheung Kwok Ming (yellow card) 90+2'; Chiu Chun Kit 90+4' (o.g.)	Report	30' Fujimoto; (yellow card) 45+3' Chiu Chun Kit; (yellow card) 67' Cheng King Ho; 76' Souza; 81' Fábio	Stadium: Tsing Yi Sports Ground (Capacity: 1,500); Attendance: 210; Referee: Luk Kin Sun; Assistant referees: Lau Fong Hei, Fok Pong Shing; Fourth official: Lui Siu Chuen

23 February 2014 Round 14	Royal Southern	1 – 1	I-Sky Yuen Long	Aberdeen, Hong Kong Island
14:30 UTC+8	Carril (yellow card) 32'; Díaz (yellow card) 42' (goal) 63'; Chung Hon Chee (yellow card) 74'	Report	28' Fábio; (yellow card) 70' Cheung Chi Kin; (yellow card) 83' Cheng King Ho	Stadium: Aberdeen Sports Ground (Capacity: 4,000); Attendance: 305; Referee: Chan Ming Siu; Assistant referees: Lui Siu Chuen, Yu Chun Sun; Fourth official: Ho Wai Sing

8 March 2013 Round 15	I-Sky Yuen Long	2 – 2	South China	Yuen Long, New Territories
17:30 UTC+8	Sandro 5', 76'; Marques (yellow card) 43'; Gustavo (yellow card) 90+4'	Report	9' (yellow card) 67' Barisic; 23' (yellow card) 89' Dhiego	Stadium: Yuen Long Stadium (Capacity: 4,932); Attendance: 1,567; Referee: Ho Wai Sing; Assistant referees: Luk Kin Sun, Yu Chun Sun; Fourth official: Tang Hing Fu

15 March 2014 Round 16	Happy Valley	Cancelled	I-Sky Yuen Long	Tai Po, New Territories
14:30 UTC+8				Stadium: Tai Po Sports Ground (Capacity: 3,000)

22 March 2014 Round 17	Sun Pegasus	4 – 0	I-Sky Yuen Long	Mong Kok, Kowloon
17:30 UTC+8	Raščić 14' (pen.); Ranđelović (yellow card) 42'; So Wai Chuen 57'; Deng Jinghuang 62'; Yip Tsz Chun 76'	Report	(yellow card) 12' Mijanović; (yellow card) 27' Chan Ka Chun; (yellow card) 32' Cheung Chi Yung; (yellow card) 63' Fung Kai Hong	Stadium: Mong Kok Stadium (Capacity: 6,680); Attendance: 1,005; Referee: Chan Ming Siu; Assistant referees: Lam Nai Kei, Yau Ho Fai; Fourth official: Cheng Oi Cho

30 March 2013 Round 18	I-Sky Yuen Long	2 – 1	Citizen	Yuen Long, New Territories
17:30 UTC+8	Souza 3', 30'; Yan Wai Hong (yellow card) 50' (yellow-red card) 84'; Gustavo (yellow card) 82'	Report	(yellow card) 28' Sham Kwok Keung; (yellow card) 74' Stefan; 90' Fernando	Stadium: Yuen Long Stadium (Capacity: 4,932); Attendance: 680; Referee: Cheng Oi Cho; Assistant referees: Lui Siu Chuen, Fok Pong Shing; Fourth official: Lo Ka Fai

6 April 2014 Round 19	Biu Chun Rangers	0 – 1	I-Sky Yuen Long	Sham Shui Po, Kowloon
14:30 UTC+8	Schutz (yellow card) 31'; Luciano (yellow card) 47'; Chan Ming Kong (yellow card) 56'	Report	(yellow card) 18' (yellow-red card) 51' Cheung Chi Yung; 57' Souza; (yellow card) 90+5' Pang Tsz Kin	Stadium: Sham Shui Po Sports Ground (Capacity: 2,194); Attendance: 323; Referee: Ho Wai Sing; Assistant referees: Yu Chun Sun, Lee Chung Yin; Fourth official: Luk Kin Sun

18 April 2013 Round 20	I-Sky Yuen Long	Cancelled	Tuen Mun	Yuen Long, New Territories
14:30 UTC+8				Stadium: Yuen Long Stadium (Capacity: 4,932)

3 May 2014 Round 21	Kitchee	v	I-Sky Yuen Long	Mong Kok, Kowloon
17:30 UTC+8				Stadium: Mong Kok Stadium (Capacity: 6,680)

10–11 May 2014 Round 22	Eastern Salon	v	I-Sky Yuen Long	Tsuen Wan, New Territories
TBC				Stadium: Shing Mun Valley Sports Ground (Capacity: 5,000)

=== Senior Shield ===
10 November 2013 1st Round	Eastern Salon	3 – 1	I-Sky Yuen Long	Mong Kok, Kowloon
17:30 UTC+8	Beto 7'; Giovane 19', 90+2'; Diego (yellow card) 45+3'; Man Pei Tak (yellow card) 75'; Lau Nim Yat (yellow card) 89'	Report	22' Fábio; (red card) 45+2' Sandro; (yellow card) 52' Marques; (yellow card) 88' Souza; (yellow card) 90+1' Cheung Tsz Kin	Stadium: Mong Kok Stadium (Capacity: 6,680); Attendance: 849; Referee: Cheng Oi Cho; Assistant referees: Lam Nai Kei, Sarao Amarjit Singh; Fourth official: Lam Chi Ho

=== FA Cup ===
19 February 2014 Round of 16	Tuen Mun	DQ – w/o	I-Sky Yuen Long	Mong Kok, Kowloon
20:00 (UTC+8)				Stadium: Mong Kok Stadium (Capacity: 6,680)

13 April 2014 Quarter-finals	Wofoo Tai Po / Biu Chun Rangers	v	I-Sky Yuen Long	Tseung Kwan O, Kowloon
14:30 UTC+8				Stadium: Tseung Kwan O Sports Ground (Capacity: 3,500)
