= Wang Jiajie =

Chinese footballer

Wang Jiajie 汪佳捷
Personal information
- Date of birth: 15 November 1988 (age 37)
- Place of birth: Shanghai, China
- Height: 1.85 m (6 ft 1 in)
- Positions: Defensive midfielder; centre-back

Youth career
- 2000–2004: Genbao Football Academy

Senior career*
Years	Team	Apps	(Gls)
2004	Shanghai Wicrrun	?	(?)
2007	Zhenjiang Groupway	?	(?)
2008–2009	Suzhou Trips	?	(?)
2009	→ Ningbo Huaao (loan)	?	(?)
2010–2020	Shanghai SIPG	139	(4)
2018	→ Shanghai Shenxin (loan)	14	(2)
2019	→ Kunshan FC (loan)	25	(3)
2020–2022	Kunshan FC	28	(1)
- * Club domestic league appearances and goals as of 31 December 2020

Wang Jiajie (Chinese: 汪佳捷; pinyin: Wāng Jiājié; born 15 November 1988 in Shanghai) is a Chinese former football player as a defensive midfielder or centre-back.

== Club career ==
Born in Shanghai, Wang joined Genbao Football Academy in 2000. He left the academy played for several China League Two clubs including Shanghai Wicrrun (later Zhenjiang Groupway), Suzhou Trips and Ningbo Huaao between 2004 and 2009. He returned to Shanghai East Asia in 2010. He became the regular player of the team in 2011. On 2 June 2012, he scored his first goal for Shanghai East Asia in the second round of 2012 Chinese FA Cup which Shanghai beat Fujian Smart Hero 6–0. His first league goal for Shanghai came on 26 August, in a 3–0 home victory against Tianjin Songjiang. Wang made 28 league appearances in the 2012 season, as Shanghai East Asia won the championship and promotion to the top flight.

On 31 January 2018, Wang was loaned to China League One side Shanghai Shenxin until 31 December 2018. On 2 March 2019, Wang was loaned to League Two side Kunshan FC for the 2019 season and was part of the team that gained promotion to the second tier at the end of the 2019 China League Two campaign. Going on to remain at Kunshan, he would go on to establish himself as regular within the team and was part of the squad that won the division and promotion to the top tier at the end of the 2022 China League One campaign.

== Career statistics ==
Statistics accurate as of match played 31 December 2020.

Appearances and goals by club, season and competition
Club	Season	League			National Cup		Continental		Other		Total	
Club	Season	Division	Apps	Goals	Apps	Goals	Apps	Goals	Apps	Goals	Apps	Goals
Shanghai Wicrrun	2004	China League Two			-		-		-			
Zhenjiang Groupway	2007	China League Two			-		-		-			
Suzhou Trips	2008	China League Two			-		-		-			
Ningbo Huaao (loan)	2009	China League Two			-		-		-			
Shanghai SIPG	2010	China League One	4	0	-		-		-		4	0
Shanghai SIPG	2011	China League One	17	0	1	0	-		-		18	0
Shanghai SIPG	2012	China League One	28	1	1	1	-		-		29	2
Shanghai SIPG	2013	Chinese Super League	28	1	0	0	-		-		28	1
Shanghai SIPG	2014	Chinese Super League	26	1	1	0	-		-		27	1
Shanghai SIPG	2015	Chinese Super League	23	1	3	0	-		-		26	1
Shanghai SIPG	2016	Chinese Super League	12	0	1	0	3	0	-		16	0
Shanghai SIPG	2017	Chinese Super League	1	0	0	0	3	0	-		4	0
Shanghai SIPG	Total		139	4	7	1	6	0	0	0	152	5
Shanghai Shenxin (loan)	2018	China League One	14	2	1	0	-		-		15	2
Kunshan FC (loan)	2019	China League Two	25	3	0	0	-		-		25	3
Kunshan FC	2020	China League One	12	1	2	0	-		-		14	1
Kunshan FC	2021	China League One	14	0	1	0	-		-		15	0
Kunshan FC	2022	China League One	2	0	2	0	-		-		4	0
Kunshan FC	Total		28	1	5	0	0	0	0	0	33	1
Career total			206	10	13	1	6	0	0	0	225	11

== Honours ==
=== Club ===
Shanghai East Asia

- China League One: 2012

Kunshan

- China League One: 2022
