= Hong Kong–Shanghai Inter Club Championship =

Association football competition between Hong Kong and Shanghai

The Hong Kong–Shanghai Inter Club Championship (Chinese: 滬港球會盃) was an annual football challenge match between two clubs representing Hong Kong and Shanghai. It was established in its most recent format in 2005 and folded in 2015.

== History ==
The origin of the Hong Kong–Shanghai Inter Club Championship comes from the Hong Kong–Shanghai Cup, a competition first established in 1908. It was held 21 times in 40 years involving representative teams from the Hong Kong and Shanghai areas. Early editions were played exclusively among the many European expatriates based in the busy port cities. After 1948, the cup was not played for again until its reestablishment in 1987, and a match was then held consecutively for another 15 years until 2002, when it halted again for various reasons, including the outbreak of SARS.

In 2005, the competition was held again and for the first time featured two club teams, Kitchee from Hong Kong and Shanghai Shenhua from Shanghai. In 2006, the name Hong Kong–Shanghai Inter Club Championship was officially adopted to reflect the club nature of the competitors. However, it is unclear whether the 2005 or 2006 version is regarded as the first staging of Hong Kong–Shanghai Inter Club Championship. 2010 was the first time the competition was played in a two-leg format.

In 2015, the competition was folded.

== Results ==
=== Hong Kong–Shanghai Cup ===
No.	Year	Home team	Score	Away team	Stadium (attendance)
1	1908	Hong Kong	3 – 0	Shanghai	
2	1913	Shanghai	2 – 1	Hong Kong	Shanghai Racecourse Ground
3	1923	Hong Kong	0 – 3	Shanghai	
4	1924	Shanghai	3 – 3; 1 – 0 (Replay)	Hong Kong	Shanghai Police Stadium
5	1925	Hong Kong	3 – 1	Shanghai	
6	1926	Shanghai	5 – 4	Hong Kong	
7	1927	Hong Kong	4 – 0	Shanghai	
8	1928	Shanghai	7 – 0	Hong Kong	
9	1929	Hong Kong	3 – 0	Shanghai	
10	1930	Shanghai	5 – 2	Hong Kong	
11	1931	Hong Kong	3 – 4	Shanghai	
12	1932	Shanghai	3 – 4	Hong Kong	
13	1933	Hong Kong	2 – 3	Shanghai	
14	1934	Shanghai	6 – 2	Hong Kong	
15	1935	Hong Kong	7 – 1	Shanghai	
16	1936	Shanghai	2 – 3	Hong Kong	
17	1937	Hong Kong	3 – 4	Shanghai	
18	1940	Shanghai	2 – 0	Hong Kong	
19	1940	Shanghai	2 – 1	Hong Kong	
20	1947	Hong Kong	0 – 0; 4 – 2 (Replay)	Shanghai	Navy Stadium
21	1948	Hong Kong	5 – 1	Shanghai	
–	1949–1986	Not Held			
22	1987	Shanghai	4 – 1	Hong Kong	Jiangwan Sports Centre (~40,000)
23	1988	Hong Kong	2 – 2; 3 – 2 (a.e.t)	Shanghai	Government Stadium
24	1989	Shanghai	1 – 0	Hong Kong	
25	1990	Hong Kong	2 – 1	Shanghai	
26	1991	Shanghai	1 – 0	Hong Kong	
27	1992	Hong Kong	0 – 1	Shanghai	
28	1993	Shanghai	0 – 0; 3 – 4 pen.	Hong Kong	
29	1994	Hong Kong	3 – 2	Shanghai Shenhua	
30	1995	Shanghai	2 – 0	Hong Kong	
31	1996	Hong Kong	2 – 3	Shanghai	
32	1997	Shanghai	3 – 1	Hong Kong	
33	1998	Hong Kong	0 – 1	Shanghai	Hong Kong Stadium (~3,000)
34	1999	Shanghai	3 – 2	Hong Kong	
35	2000	Hong Kong League XI	0 – 0; 5 – 3 pen.	Shanghai Shenhua	Hong Kong Stadium
36	2001	Shanghai Shenhua	1 – 1; 5 – 6 pen.	Hong Kong	Jin Hui Stadium
–	2002–2004	Not Held			
37	2005	Kitchee	0 – 1	Shanghai Shenhua	Mong Kok Stadium (1,549)

=== Hong Kong–Shanghai Inter Club Championship ===
No.	Year	Home team	Score	Away team	Stadium (attendance)
1	2006	Shanghai Shenhua	1 – 0	Buler Rangers	Hongkou Stadium
	2007	Not Held			
2	2008	South China	1 – 2	Shanghai Shenhua	Hong Kong Stadium (2,921)
	2009	Not Held			
3	2010	Shanghai East Asia	4 – 1	Citizen	Yuanshen Sports Centre Stadium
3	2010	Citizen	2 – 1	Shanghai East Asia	Siu Sai Wan Sports Ground (308)
3	2010	Shanghai East Asia won by an aggregate 5–3			
4	2011	Wofoo Tai Po	2 – 3	Shanghai East Asia	Mong Kok Stadium (1,876)
4	2011	Shanghai East Asia	7 – 1	Wofoo Tai Po	Yuanshen Sports Centre Stadium
4	2011	Shanghai East Asia won by an aggregate 10–3			
5	2012	Kitchee	0 – 4	Shanghai East Asia	Tseung Kwan O Sports Ground (737)
5	2012	Shanghai East Asia	3 – 2	Kitchee	Yuanshen Sports Centre Stadium
5	2012	Shanghai East Asia won by an aggregate 7–2			
6	2013	Shanghai SIPG	2 – 1	South China	Yuanshen Sports Centre Stadium
6	2013	South China	1 – 0	Shanghai SIPG	Mong Kok Stadium (1,872)
6	2013	Shanghai SIPG won by an aggregate 2–2 ( 7–6 pen.)			
7	2014	Shanghai SIPG	6 – 1	Kitchee	Shanghai Stadium
7	2014	Kitchee	0 – 0	Shanghai SIPG	Mong Kok Stadium (878)
7	2014	Shanghai SIPG won by an aggregate 6–1			
Folded since 2015

== Winners table ==
Rank	Representing Region	Winners
1st	Shanghai	29
2nd	Hong Kong	15
