= 2008 Hong Kong–Shanghai Inter Club Championship =

2008 Hong Kong–Shanghai Inter Club Championship is the 3rd staging of Hong Kong-Shanghai Inter Club Championship.

== Result ==
2008-01-24
20:15 GMT+8

| South China | 1 – 2 | Shanghai Shenhua |
|---|---|---|
| Fan Weijun 14' | (Report) | Chen Liang 23'; Yu Tao 78' |

Hong Kong Stadium, Hong Kong
Attendance: 2,921

SOUTH CHINA:
| GK | 23 | (China) Zhang Chunhui |
| DF | 2 | (Hong Kong) Lee Chi Ho | (yellow card) 72' |
| DF | 3 | (Brazil) Sidrailson | | (- 87') |
| DF | 4 | (China) Deng Jinghuang | | (-90') |
| DF | 25 | (Togo) Cris |
| MF | 11 | (China) Li Haiqiang (C) | (yellow card) 27' | (- 83') |
| MF | 13 | (Hong Kong) Chan Chi Hong | | (- 53') |
| MF | 21 | (Hong Kong) Man Pei Tak | | (- 90') |
| MF | 26 | (Brazil) Itaparica | | (- 46') |
| MF | 39 | (China) Fan Weijun 14' | | (- 75') |
| FW | 28 | (Brazil) Maxwell | | (- 66') |
Substitutions:
| DF | 6 | (Hong Kong) Wong Chin Hung | | (+ 90') |
| DF | 15 | (Hong Kong) Chan Wai Ho | | (+ 87') |
| MF | 5 | (China) Bai He | | (+ 75') |
| MF | 8 | (Hong Kong) Yeung Ching Kwong | | (+ 90') |
| MF | 18 | (Hong Kong) Kwok Kin Pong | | (+ 66') |
| MF | 20 | (Hong Kong) Yip Chi Ho | | (+ 83') |
| FW | 28 | (Brazil) Tales Schutz | | (+ 53') |
Unused Substitutions:
| GK | 1 | (Hong Kong) Chung Ho Yin |
| MF | 19 | (Hong Kong) Cheng Siu Wai |
| FW | 30 | (Brazil) Detinho |
Coach:
| | | (Portugal) José Luis |

SHANGHAI SHENHUA:
| GK | 1 | (China) Wang Dalei | | (- 75') |
| DF | 2 | (China) Yau Lijun | (yellow card) 74' | (- 78') |
| DF | 3 | (Hong Kong) Ng Wai Chiu | (yellow card) 53' | (- 55') |
| DF | 5 | (China) Du Wei (C) |
| DF | 13 | (China) Chen Liang 24' | (yellow card) 25' |
| MF | 16 | (China) Yu Tao 78' |
| MF | 18 | (China) Zhen Kewei | | (- 72') |
| MF | 21 | (China) Jiang Kun | | (- 65') |
| MF | 27 | (China) Mao Jianqin | (yellow card) 18' |
| MF | 39 | (China) Shong Xingyi | | (- 22') |
| FW | 29 | (China) Gao Lin | | (- 88') |
Substitutions:
| GK | 12 | (China) Zhang Cheng | | (+ 75') |
| | 24 | (China) Xu Yang | | (+ 55') |
| MF | 25 | (China) Yin Xifu | (yellow card) 84' | (+ 22') |
| | 30 | (China) Yang Chungang | | (+ 88') |
| MF | 31 | (China) Xiao Zhanbo | | (+ 65') |
| | 32 | (China) Liu Yinlao | | (+ 72') |
| | 37 | (China) Feng Qi | (yellow card) 60' | (+ 78') |
Unused Substitutions:
| | 28 | (China) Tao Jin |
| MF | 36 | (China) Bai Xuefeng |
Coach:
| | | (China) Wu Jingui |
