= 1987 Hong Kong–Shanghai Cup =

1987 Hong Kong–Shanghai Cup was the 22nd staging of the Hong Kong-Shanghai Cup and the first staging after the competition was halted for about 40 years. Shanghai captured the championship by winning 4–1.

== Squads ==
The following are part of the squads for both teams.

=== Hong Kong ===
- Chan Hing Wing
- Pang Kam Chuen
- Chan Kwok Fai
- Leung Sui Wing
- Tam Ah Fook
- Lee Kin Wo
- Tang Kam Tim
- Kum Kam Fai
- Lai Wing Cheong
- Tim Bredbury
- Chan Fat Chi

=== Shanghai ===
- Zhang Weikang
- Zheng Yan
- Li Longha
- Qin Guoyong
- Zhu Youhong

== Result ==
29 March 1987

| Shanghai | 4 – 1 | Hong Kong |
|---|---|---|
| | (Report) (in Chinese) | Lee Kin Wo (?) |

Jiangwan Sports Centre, Shanghai
Attendance: 40,000
