= 1948 Hong Kong–Shanghai Cup =

Final positions
- Champions: Hong Kong (11th title)
- Runners-up: Shanghai

1948 Hong Kong–Shanghai Cup was the 21st staging of Hong Kong-Shanghai Cup and the last staging before the competition was halted for about 40 years. Hong Kong captured the champion by winning 5–1.

== Result ==
10 February 1948

Hong Kong	5 – 1	Shanghai
鄒文治 15' 鄧宜杰 18' 基亞能 47' 朱永強 ?' (pen.) 鄧宜杰 ?'	(Report) (in Chinese)	Fei Chun Wah ?'

Hong Kong
