= 1908 Hong Kong–Shanghai Cup =

1908 Hong Kong–Shanghai Cup was the 1st staging of Hong Kong-Shanghai Cup. The host team Hong Kong captured the trophy by winning 3-0. Both Hong Kong and Shanghai teams were formed by non-Chinese players.

== Result ==
Hong Kong	3 – 0	Shanghai
	(Report)

Hong Kong
