= 2006 Hong Kong–Shanghai Inter Club Championship =

2006 Hong Kong–Shanghai Inter Club Championship is officially the 1st staging of Hong Kong-Shanghai Inter Club Championship. Buler Rangers represented Hong Kong to compete by topping the league after the first half of the season while Shanghai Shenhua represented Shanghai.

Shanghai Shenhua lifted the first trophy of this competition after winning 1-0.

== Rules ==
- A draw would directly lead to penalty shootout rather than an extra time
- Each team can only have a maximum of 4 foreign players on the field.

== Squads ==
Some of the players include:

=== Shanghai Shenhua ===
- (China) Li Weifeng
- (China) Du Wei
- (China) Gao Lin
- (China) Sun Xiang
- (China) Xiao Zhanbo

=== Buler Rangers ===
- (China) Zhang Chunhui
- (Hong Kong) Yip Chi Ho
- (Ghana) Fofo Agbo

== Result ==
2006-04-07
15:00 GMT+8

Shanghai Shenhua	1 – 0	Buler Rangers
Xiao Zhanbo 19' (pen.)	(Report)	Zhang Chunhui (red card) 18'

Hongkou Stadium, Shanghai, China
