= Eddy Francis =

Chinese footballer (born 1990)

Aidi
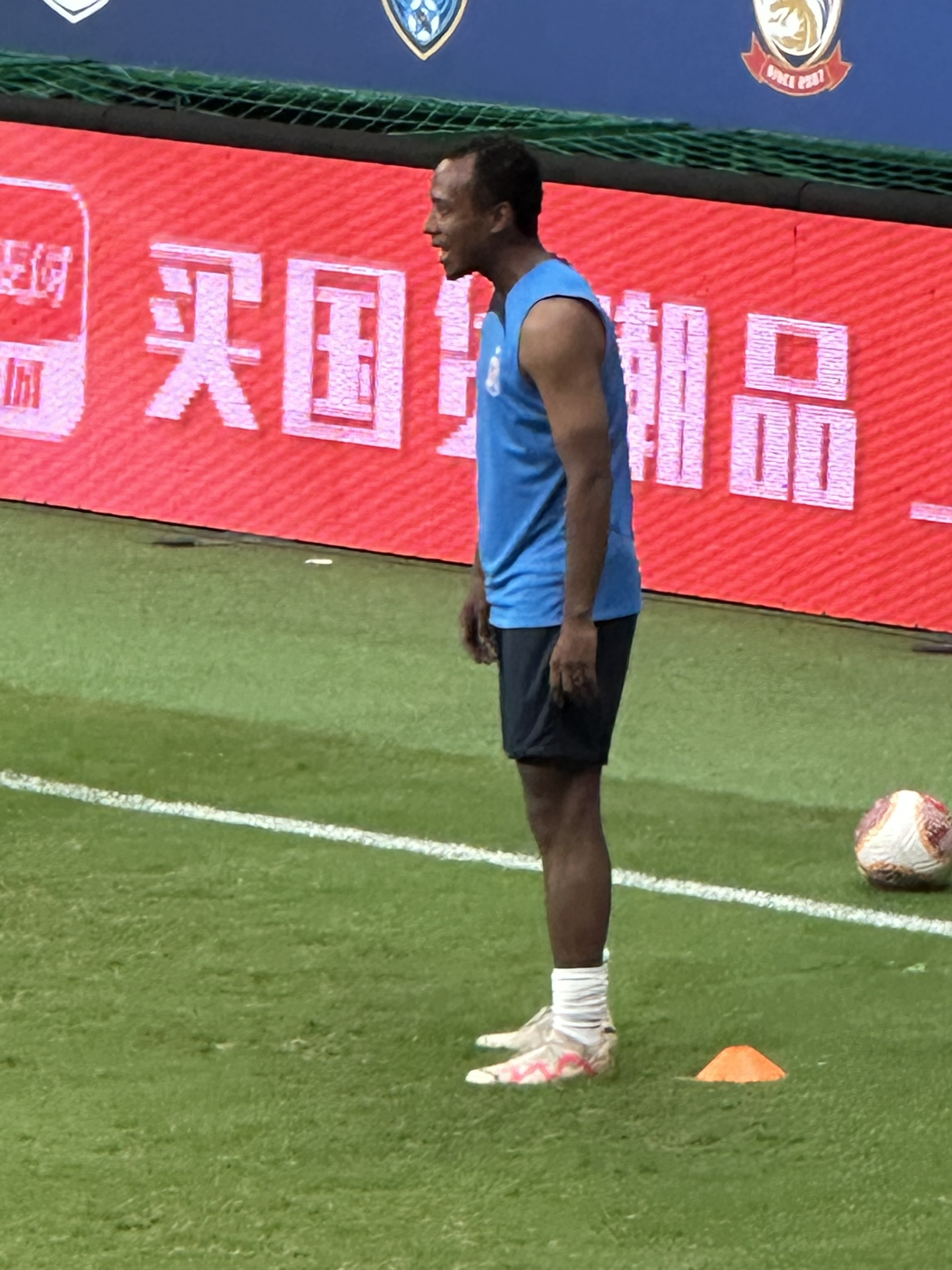
- Aidi in August 2024

Personal information
- Full name: Eddy Juan Francis Coetzee
- Date of birth: 17 December 1990 (age 35)
- Place of birth: Shanghai, China
- Height: 1.80 m (5 ft 11 in)
- Position: Defender

Team information
- Current team: Shanghai Second (on loan from Ningbo FC)
- Number: 40

Youth career
- 2000–2005: Genbao Football Academy
- 2007: Shanghai Shenhua

Senior career*
Years	Team	Apps	(Gls)
2006	Shanghai East Asia		
2008	Suzhou Trips	0	(0)
2009	Ningbo Huaao		
2010–2011	Shanghai East Asia	26	(2)
2012–2016	Dalian Yifang	58	(0)
2012	→ Shanghai East Asia (loan)	3	(0)
2017–2018	Boavista	2	(0)
2018–2025	Shanghai Shenhua	117	(2)
2026–	Ningbo FC	4	(0)
2026–	→ Shanghai Second (loan)	0	(0)

International career^{‡}
2004	China U14	1	(0)
- * Club domestic league appearances and goals as of 25 August 2025 ‡ National team caps and goals as of 8 February 2018

Eddy Juan Francis Coetzee, also known as Aidi Fulangxisi (Chinese: 艾迪·弗朗西斯; pinyin: Àidí Fúlǎngxīsī; born 17 December 1990) or simply Aidi, is a Chinese professional footballer who plays as a defender for China League Two club Shanghai Second, on loan from Ningbo FC.

== Club career ==
Born in Shanghai, Aidi's mother is Chinese and his father is Tanzanian. He joined Genbao Football Academy when he was ten years old. In the end of 2005, he joined Shanghai East Asia with whole Genbao Football Academy team and started his career. But after his first season, he was downsized and moved to Shanghai Shenhua. In 2008, he moved to China League Two club Suzhou Trips after unhappiness with Shanghai Shenhua, but had no appearance because of problems regarding his registration. In 2009 Suzhou Trips quit China League Two, Aidi signed on loan to Ningbo Huaao for a year. After his loan finished, he moved to China League One club Shanghai East Asia immediately, returned to the start of his football career.

On 20 January 2012, Shanghai East Asia swapped Aidi with Luis Cabezas of Chinese Super League side Dalian Aerbin. He was loaned back to Shanghai East Asia for one year in February 2012. However, he failed to establish himself within the team and made just three appearances (all came on as substitute) in the 2012 league season. On 8 March 2014, Aidi made his debut for Dalian Aerbin in the 2014 Chinese Super League against Hangzhou Greentown, coming on as a substitute for Zhu Xiaogang in the 77th minute.

On 29 January 2017, Portuguese club Boavista signed Aidi on a one-and-a-half-year contract. This transfer is said to come through a partnership with the Chinese Football Association.

On 7 February 2018, Shanghai Greenland Shenhua announced that Aidi would join the club and play in the Chinese Super League and AFC Champions League. He would make his debut on 26 February 2018 in the Chinese FA Super Cup against Guangzhou Evergrande Taobao F.C. that ended in a 4–1 defeat. This was followed by his first league appearance for the club on 2 March 2018 against Changchun Yatai that resulted in a 1–1 draw.

On 27 January 2026, Aidi joined China League One club Ningbo FC.

== International career ==
Aidi played 27 minutes for the China under-14 team in the 2004 AFC U-14 Championship; he is the first mixed-race player for the China national football teams at all age level. Because of his Tanzanian background, he is also eligible to represent Tanzania.

== Career statistics ==
Statistics accurate as of match played 31 January 2023.

Appearances and goals by club, season and competition
Club	Season	League			National Cup		League Cup		Continental		Other		Total	
Club	Season	Division	Apps	Goals	Apps	Goals	Apps	Goals	Apps	Goals	Apps	Goals	Apps	Goals
Shanghai East Asia	2006	China League Two			-		-		-		-			
Suzhou Trips	2008	China League Two	0	0	-		-		-		-		0	0
Ningbo Huaao	2009	China League Two			-		-		-		-			
Shanghai East Asia	2010	China League One	7	0	-		-		-		-		7	0
Shanghai East Asia	2011	China League One	19	2	1	0	-		-		-		20	2
Shanghai East Asia	Total		26	2	1	0	0	0	0	0	0	0	27	2
Dalian Yifang	2012	Chinese Super League	0	0	0	0	-		-		-		0	0
Dalian Yifang	2013	Chinese Super League	0	0	0	0	-		-		-		0	0
Dalian Yifang	2014	Chinese Super League	19	0	0	0	-		-		-		19	0
Dalian Yifang	2015	China League One	28	0	2	0	-		-		-		30	0
Dalian Yifang	2016	China League One	11	0	2	0	-		-		-		13	0
Dalian Yifang	Total		58	0	4	0	0	0	0	0	0	0	62	0
Shanghai East Asia (loan)	2012	China League One	3	0	1	0	-		-		-		4	0
Boavista	2016–17	Primeira Liga	2	0	0	0	0	0	-		-		2	0
Boavista	2017–18	Primeira Liga	0	0	0	0	0	0	-		-		0	0
Boavista	Total		2	0	0	0	0	0	0	0	0	0	2	0
Shanghai Shenhua	2018	Chinese Super League	27	1	1	0	-		3	0	1 (Note: Appearances in Chinese FA Super Cup)	0	32	1
Shanghai Shenhua	2019	Chinese Super League	17	0	5	0	-		-		-		22	0
Shanghai Shenhua	2020	Chinese Super League	10	0	1	0	-		5	0	-		16	0
Shanghai Shenhua	2021	Chinese Super League	14	0	4	0	-		-		-		18	0
Shanghai Shenhua	2022	Chinese Super League	12	1	4	1	-		-		-		16	2
Shanghai Shenhua	Total		80	2	15	1	0	0	8	0	1	0	104	3
Career total			169	4	21	1	0	0	8	0	1	0	199	5

== Honours ==
Shanghai East Asia

- China League One: 2012

Shanghai Shenhua

- Chinese FA Cup: 2019, 2023
- Chinese FA Super Cup: 2024, 2025
