= Lau Ka Ming =

Hong Kong footballer

Lau Ka Ming 劉家銘
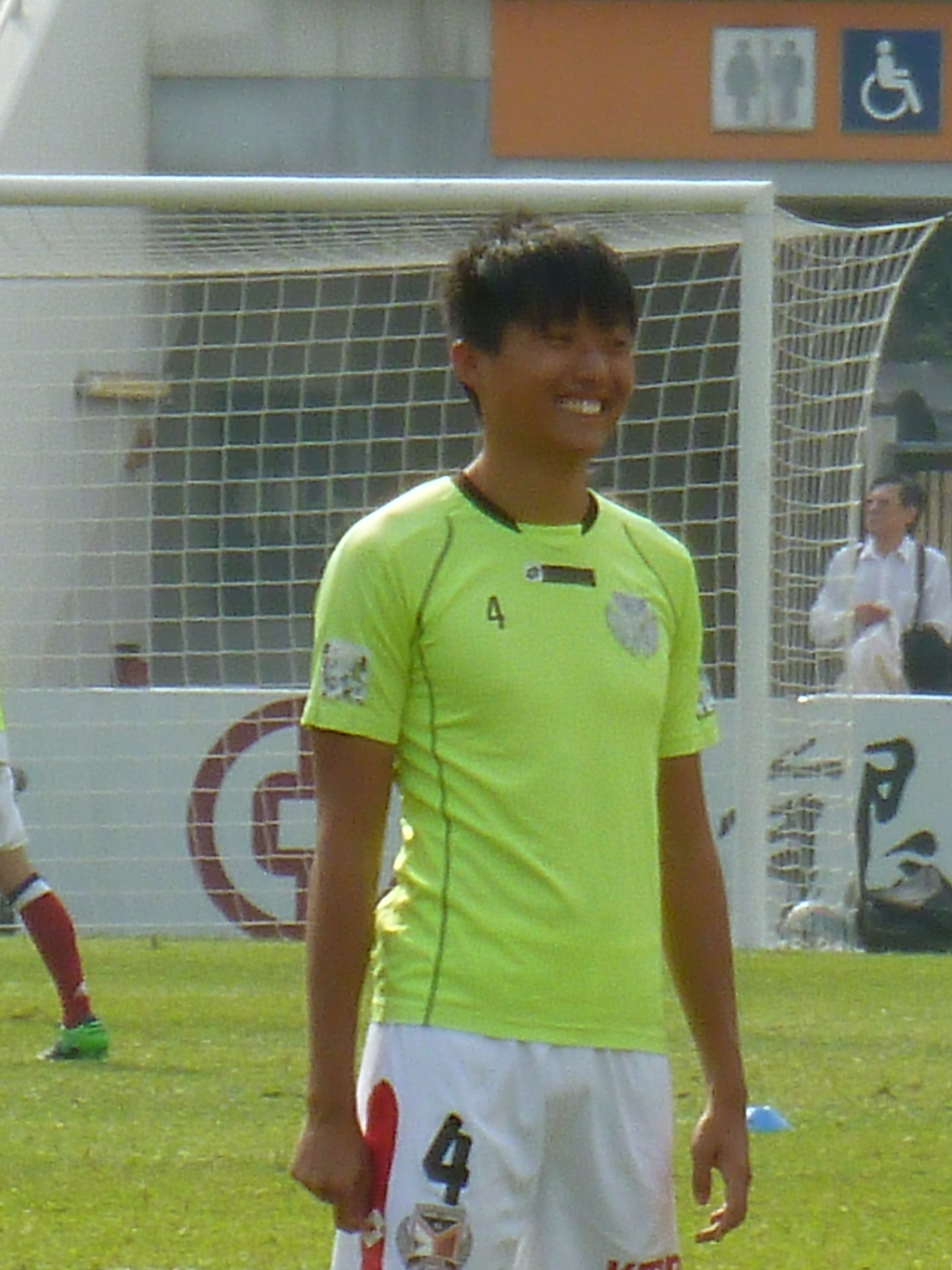

Personal information
- Full name: Lau Ka Ming
- Date of birth: 31 December 1993 (age 32)
- Place of birth: Hong Kong
- Height: 1.80 m (5 ft 11 in)
- Positions: Defender; midfielder

Senior career*
Years	Team	Apps	(Gls)
2009–2012	Sham Shui Po	14	(1)
2012–2013	Kwai Tsing	10	(1)
2013–2018	Yuen Long	61	(0)
2018–2020	Southern	17	(0)
2020–2022	Shatin	18	(2)
2022–2024	Kowloon City	43	(4)
2024–2025	Shatin	2	(5)
2025–	WSE	24	(2)

International career
2015	Hong Kong U-22	1	(0)
- * Club domestic league appearances and goals as of 29 June 2020

Lau Ka Ming (Chinese: 劉家銘, born 31 December 1993 in Hong Kong) is a former Hong Kong professional footballer who played as a defender or a midfielder.

== Family ==
Lau Ka Ming's brother Lau Hok Ming is also a professional football player.

== Honours ==
=== Club ===
Yuen Long

- Hong Kong Senior Shield: 2017–18

=== International ===
Hong Kong

- Guangdong-Hong Kong Cup: 2018
