= Tsui Wang Kit =

Hong Kong footballer

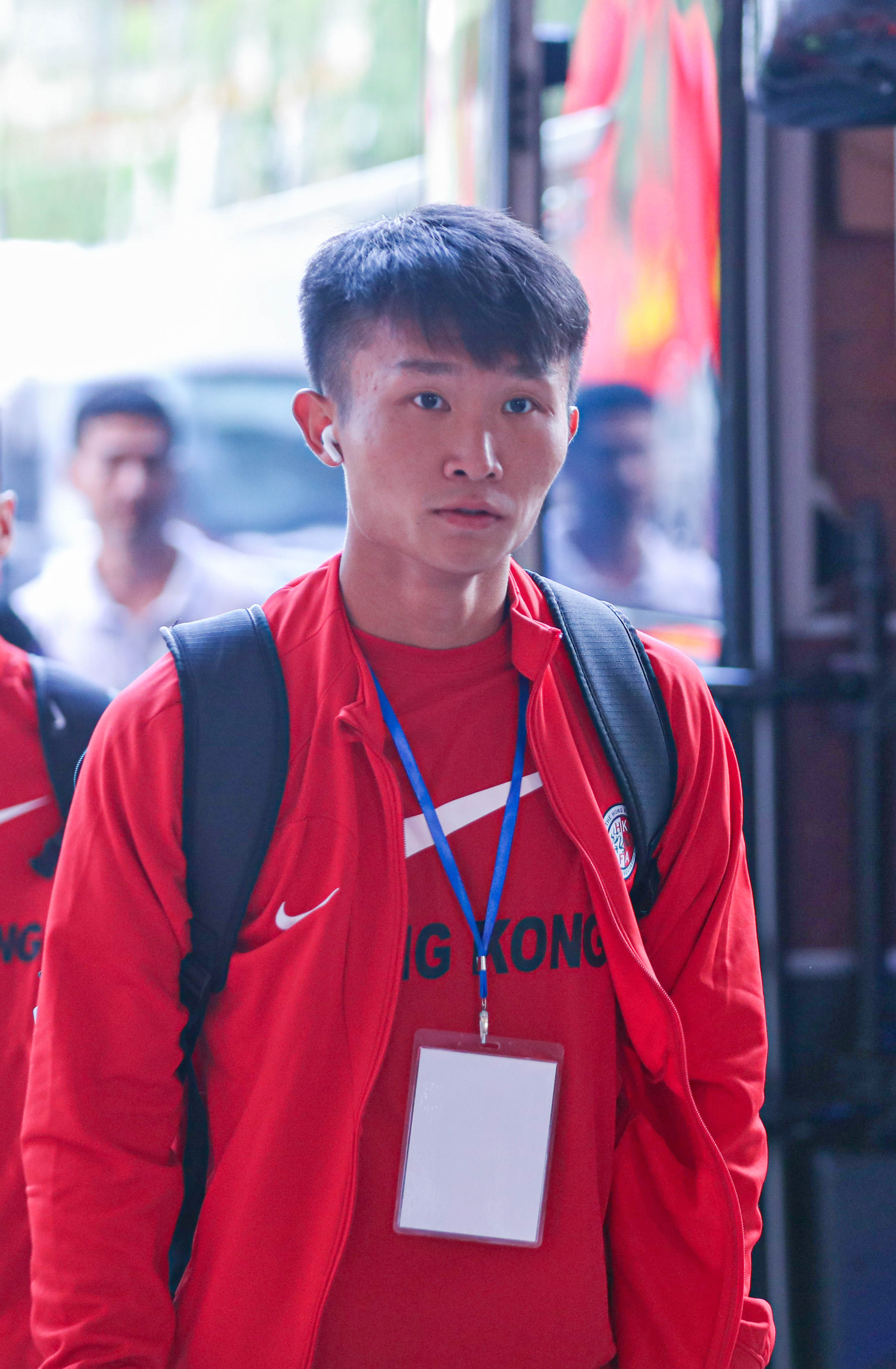

Personal information
- Full name: Tsui Wang Kit
- Date of birth: 5 January 1997 (age 29)
- Place of birth: Hong Kong
- Height: 1.77 m (5 ft 9 1/2 in)
- Positions: Right back; centre back

Team information
- Current team: Yunnan Yukun
- Number: 3

Youth career
- 2010–2014: Rangers (HKG)

Senior career*
Years	Team	Apps	(Gls)
2014–2016	Rangers (HKG)	7	(0)
2016–2017	Biu Chun Glory Sky	14	(0)
2017–2018	Rangers (HKG)	5	(0)
2018–2020	Meizhou Hakka	36	(0)
2020	R&F	0	(0)
2020–2024	Lee Man	50	(6)
2024–	Yunnan Yukun	32	(3)

International career^{‡}
2016–2019	Hong Kong U-23	10	(1)
2017–	Hong Kong	31	(1)
Medal record
Men's football
Representing Hong Kong
FIFA ASEAN Challenge Cup
Winner	2026 Hong Kong
- * Club domestic league appearances and goals as of 8 November 2026 ‡ National team caps and goals as of 3 October 2026

Tsui Wang Kit (Chinese: 徐宏傑; born 5 January 1997) is a Hong Kong professional footballer who currently plays as a right back for Chinese Super League club Yunnan Yukun and the Hong Kong national team.

== Club career ==
On 10 January 2018, Tsui transferred to the China League One side Meizhou Hakka. According to the rules of the Chinese Football League, he is deemed a native player.

On 1 May 2020, Meizhou Hakka agreed to a swap with R&F for Leung Nok Hang. Tsui revealed to the media that his contract length was two years. On 14 October 2020, Tsui left the club after his club's withdrawal from the HKPL in the new season.

On 28 November 2020, Tsui signed with Lee Man.

On 10 June 2024, Lee Man announced the departure of Tsui.

On 18 June 2024, Tsui returned to China League One and joined Yunnan Yukun.

== International career ==
On 31 August 2017, Tsui made his international debut for Hong Kong in a friendly match against Singapore.

Tsui scored his first goal for Hong Kong in the 86th minute of a EAFF E-1 Preliminary Round Group Stage match against Chinese Taipei, which qualified Hong Kong to the finals against Guam.

== Career statistics ==
=== Club ===
As of match played 28 September 2019.

Club	Season	League			National Cup		League Cup		Continental		Others		Total	
Club	Season	Division	Apps	Goals	Apps	Goals	Apps	Goals	Apps	Goals	Apps	Goals	Apps	Goals
Rangers	2014–15	Hong Kong Premier League	1	0	0	0	0	0	–		0	0	1	0
Rangers	2015–16	Hong Kong Premier League	7	0	3	0	4	0	–		2 (Note: Appearances in the Hong Kong Sapling Cup)	0	16	0
Rangers	Total		8	0	3	0	4	0	0	0	2	0	17	0
Biu Chun Glory Sky	2016–17	Hong Kong Premier League	14	0	2	0	0	0	–		3 (Note: Appearances in the Hong Kong Senior Challenge Shield and the Hong Kong Sapling Cup)	0	19	0
Rangers	2017–18	Hong Kong Premier League	5	0	0	0	0	0	–		4	0	9	0
Meizhou Hakka	2018	China League One	21	0	0	0	0	0	–		0	0	21	0
Meizhou Hakka	2019	China League One	15	0	1	0	0	0	–		0	0	16	0
Meizhou Hakka	Total		36	0	1	0	0	0	0	0	0	0	37	0
Career total			63	0	6	0	4	0	0	0	9	0	82	0

=== International ===
As of 3 October 2026

National team	Year	Apps	Goals
Hong Kong	2017	2	0
Hong Kong	2018	1	0
Hong Kong	2019	8	0
Hong Kong	2020	0	0
Hong Kong	2021	2	0
Hong Kong	2022	5	0
Hong Kong	2023	3	0
Hong Kong	2024	6	1
Hong Kong	2025	1	0
Hong Kong	2026	3	0
Total		31	1

#	Date	Venue	Opponent	Result	Competition
2017
1	31 August 2017	Jalan Besar Stadium, Kallang, Singapore	Singapore	1–1	Friendly
2	5 October 2017	Mong Kok Stadium, Mong Kok, Hong Kong	Laos	4–0	Friendly
2018
3	27 March 2018	Kim Il-sung Stadium, Pyongyang, North Korea	North Korea	0–2	2019 AFC Asian Cup qualification
2019
4	11 June 2019	Mong Kok Stadium, Mong Kok, Hong Kong	Chinese Taipei	0–2	Friendly
5	5 September 2019	Phnom Penh Olympic Stadium, Phnom Penh, Cambodia	Cambodia	1–1	2022 FIFA World Cup qualification – AFC second round
6	10 September 2019	Hong Kong Stadium, So Kon Po, Hong Kong	Iran	0–2	2022 FIFA World Cup qualification – AFC second round
7	14 November 2019	Hong Kong Stadium, So Kon Po, Hong Kong	Bahrain	0–0	2022 FIFA World Cup qualification – AFC second round
8	19 November 2019	Hong Kong Stadium, So Kon Po, Hong Kong	Cambodia	2–0	2022 FIFA World Cup qualification – AFC second round
9	11 December 2019	Busan Asiad Main Stadium, Busan, South Korea	South Korea	0–2	2019 EAFF E-1 Football Championship
10	14 December 2019	Busan Gudeok Stadium, Busan, South Korea	Japan	0–5	2019 EAFF E-1 Football Championship
11	18 December 2019	Busan Asiad Main Stadium, Busan, South Korea	China	0–2	2019 EAFF E-1 Football Championship
2021
12	3 June 2021	Al Muharraq Stadium, Arad, Bahrain	Iran	1–3	2022 FIFA World Cup qualification – AFC second round
13	11 June 2021	Al Muharraq Stadium, Arad, Bahrain	Iraq	0–1	2022 FIFA World Cup qualification – AFC second round
2022
14	1 June 2022	Bukit Jalil Stadium, Kuala Lumpur, Malaysia	Malaysia	0–2	Friendly
15	19 July 2022	Kashima Stadium, Kashima, Japan	Japan	0–6	2022 EAFF E-1 Football Championship
16	24 July 2022	Toyota Stadium, Toyota, Japan	South Korea	0–3	2022 EAFF E-1 Football Championship
17	21 September 2022	Mong Kok Stadium, Mong Kok, Hong Kong	Myanmar	2–0	Friendly
18	24 September 2022	Hong Kong Stadium, So Kon Po, Hong Kong	Myanmar	0–0	Friendly
2023
19	23 March 2023	Mong Kok Stadium, Mong Kok, Hong Kong	Singapore	1–1	Friendly
20	15 June 2023	Lạch Tray Stadium, Hai Phong, Vietnam	Vietnam	0–1	Friendly
21	7 September 2023	National Olympic Stadium, Phnom Penh, Cambodia	Cambodia	1–1	Friendly
2024
22	21 March 2024	Mong Kok Stadium, Mong Kok, Hong Kong	Uzbekistan	0–2	2026 FIFA World Cup qualification – AFC second round
23	26 March 2024	Milliy Stadium, Tashkent, Uzbekistan	Uzbekistan	0–3	2026 FIFA World Cup qualification – AFC second round
24	14 November 2024	Hong Kong Stadium, So Kon Po, Hong Kong	Philippines	3–1	Friendly
25	8 December 2024	Mong Kok Stadium, Mong Kok, Hong Kong	Mongolia	3–0	2025 EAFF E-1 Football Championship – preliminary round
26	14 December 2024	Mong Kok Stadium, Mong Kok, Hong Kong	Chinese Taipei	2–1	2025 EAFF E-1 Football Championship – preliminary round

=== International goals ===
No.	Date	Cap	Venue	Opponent	Score	Result	Competition
1.	14 December 2024	26	Mong Kok Stadium, Hong Kong	Chinese Taipei	2–1	2–1	2025 EAFF E-1 Football Championship – preliminary round

== Honours ==
Lee Man

- Hong Kong Premier League: 2023–24

Hong Kong

- Guangdong-Hong Kong Cup: 2018
- FIFA ASEAN Challenge Cup: 2026

Individual

- Hong Kong Premier League Team of the Year: 2023–24
