= Yin Xifu =

Chinese footballer and coach

Yin Xifu 殷锡福
Personal information
- Date of birth: March 3, 1982 (age 44)
- Place of birth: Dalian, Liaoning, China
- Height: 1.76 m (5 ft 9 in)
- Position: Left midfielder

Senior career*
Years	Team	Apps	(Gls)
2001–2002	Shanghai Shenhua	1	(0)
2003–2004	Shanghai The 9	?	(?)
2005–2006	Shanghai United	31	(4)
2007–2010	Shanghai Shenhua	21	(0)
- * Club domestic league appearances and goals as of 17 March 2010

Yin Xifu (simplified Chinese: 殷锡福; traditional Chinese: 殷錫福; pinyin: Yīn Xífú) (born 3 March 1982) is a Chinese football coach and a former footballer who played as a left midfielder for Shanghai Shenhua, Shanghai The 9 and Shanghai United.

== Club career ==
Yin Xifu started his professional football career at Shanghai Shenhua after graduating from their youth team where he was considered good enough to be trained in Brazil. He would make his senior debut at the beginning of the 2001 football league season, however despite staying for a further season he was unable to establish himself within the squad and only made one league appearance for Shanghai.

The following season Yin Xifu would move to Shanghai The 9 who were a newly formed club starting at the bottom of the professional Chinese football league system. Over there Yin Xifu saw the team quickly rise through the league system by winning the third tier league and getting promoted to the second tier in his first season. However club owner Zhu Jun left the club and moved to Shanghai United, with him he decided to take several players to play in the Chinese Super League and Yin Xifu was one of them.

While at Shanghai United he played in 19 league games and scored one goal in his debut 2005 league season with the club. This was followed by a further 12 league games and three goals as the club established themselves within China's top division at the end of the 2006 campaign. However once again club owner Zhu Jun of Shanghai United F.C. decided to move to Shanghai Shenhua at the beginning of the 2007 football league season. This time Zhu Jun merged both Shanghai United and Shanghai Shenhua, with Shanghai Shenhua keeping their name. Yin Xifu struggled to be included in the Shanghai Shenhua team, however once the squad was significantly reduced Yin Xifu found more playing time and was included in the Shanghai Shenhua squad to play in the first competitive game of the 2009 AFC Champions League against Singapore Armed Forces FC. Yin's revival back into the first team did not last very long and by the 2010 league season he was dropped from the first team and acted as a coach for the reserve team for a brief period before he decided to retire. Once his career ended he would move into coaching permanently and by 2013 he was promoted to the first team coaching staff at Shenhua.

== Honours ==
Shanghai The 9

- China League Two: 2004
