= Jiang Yong =

Chinese scientist

- 江涌
- Born: 1963 (age 62–63); Anxiang County, Changde, China
- Education: National University of Defense Technology
- Scientific career
- Fields: Aircraft
- Workplaces: Second Research Institute of China Aerospace Science and Industry Corporation

Chinese name
- Simplified Chinese: 江涌
- Traditional Chinese: 江湧
Transcriptions
Standard Mandarin
- Hanyu Pinyin: Jiāng Yǒng

Jiang Yong (born 1963) is a Chinese scientist who is a chief designer at the Second Research Institute of China Aerospace Science and Industry Corporation, and an academician of the Chinese Academy of Sciences.

== Biography ==
Jiang was born in Anxiang County, Changde, in 1963. After resuming the college entrance examination in 1979, he was accepted to National University of Defense Technology. After university, he joined the China Aerospace Science and Industry Corporation.

== Honours and awards ==
- 18 November 2021 Member of the Chinese Academy of Sciences (CAS)
