= Cheung Chi Yung =

Hong Kong footballer

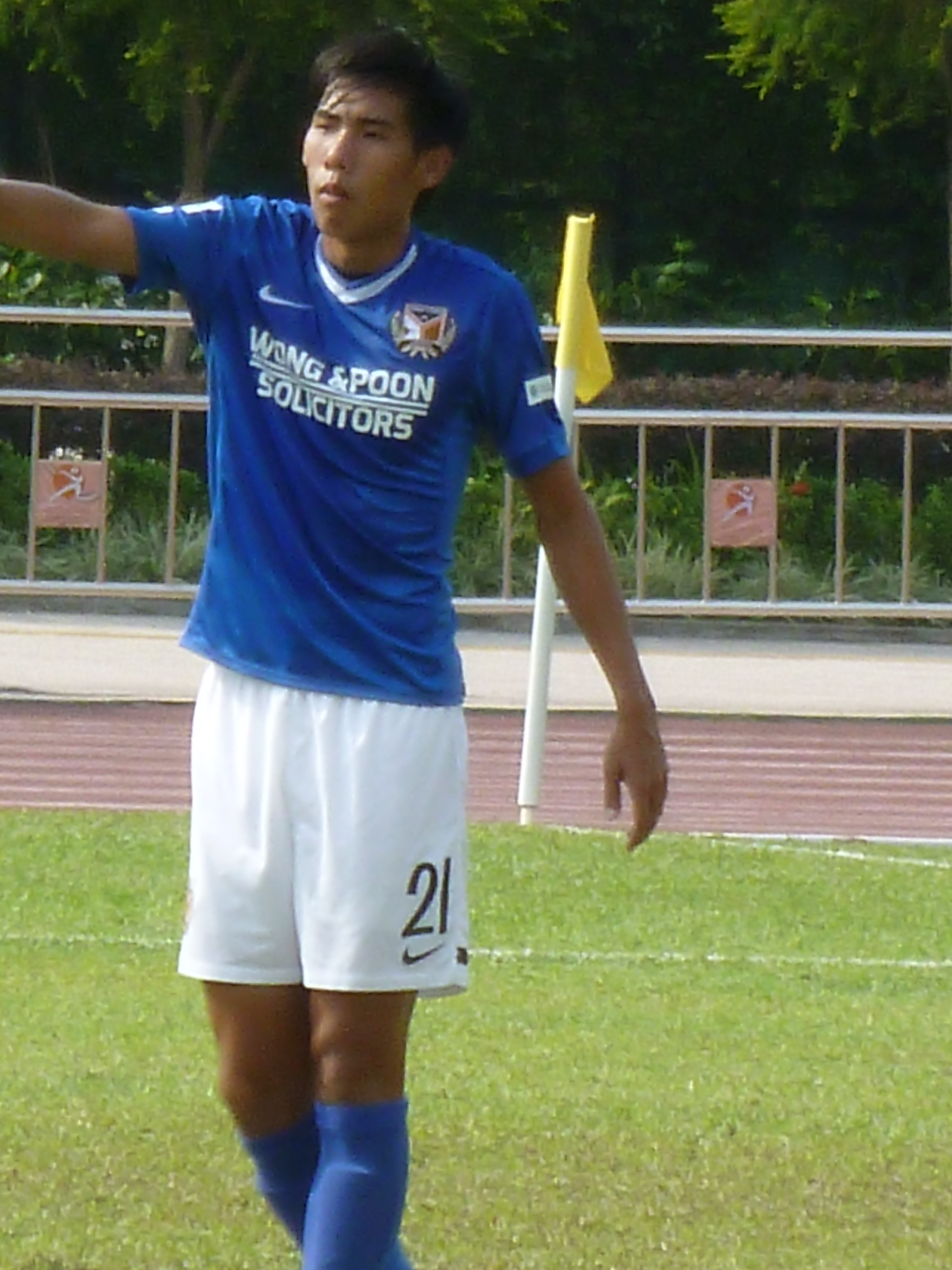

Personal information
- Full name: Cheung Chi Yung
- Date of birth: 30 June 1989 (age 37)
- Place of birth: Hong Kong
- Height: 1.85 m (6 ft 1 in)
- Position: Centre back

Youth career
- 2007–2008: Tai Po

Senior career*
Years	Team	Apps	(Gls)
2008–2012	Tai Po	15	(0)
2012–2013	Sun Hei	8	(0)
2013–2015	Yuen Long	35	(1)
2015–2016	South China	5	(0)
2016–2020	Pegasus	52	(2)
2020–2021	Yuen Long	5	(0)
2021–2022	Tai Po	8	(0)

International career^{‡}
2009	Hong Kong U-20		
2010–2011	Hong Kong U-23		
- * Club domestic league appearances and goals as of 19 December 2021 ‡ National team caps and goals as of 11 June 2015

Cheung Chi Yung (Chinese: 張志勇; born 30 June 1989 in Hong Kong) is a former Hong Kong professional football player who played as a centre back.

== Club career ==
=== Tai Po ===
Cheung joined Tai Po youth team and was promoted to the first team in the 2008–09 season and was paid HK$3,000 per month. However, he was only given limited match chances and thus he chose to leave the club after the 2011–12 season.

=== Sun Hei ===
Cheung joined fellow First Division club Sunray Cave JC Sun Hei. He played his debut AFC Cup match in the season.

=== Yuen Long ===
After spending a season at Sun Hei, Cheung joined newly promoted First Division club Yuen Long on a free transfer on 3 June 2013.

=== South China ===
On 10 June 2015, Cheung joined South China on a one-year contract.

=== Pegasus ===
Cheung moved onto Pegasus at the beginning of the 2016–17 season. He became a regular starter, appearing in 16 league matches for the club in the first season.

In July 2020, Cheung left the club after his contract expired. Since then he has obtained licenses as bartender and personal fitness coach.

On 3 November 2020, Cheung announced his retirement from professional football.

=== Yuen Long ===
In March 2021, Cheung joined Yuen Long.

== International career ==
On 3 January 2016, Cheung scored his first goal for Hong Kong in the 38th Guangdong–Hong Kong Cup.

== Career statistics ==
=== Club ===
As of 21 May 2021.

Club	Season	Division	League		Shield & FA Cup		League Cup		AFC Cup		Others^{1}		Total	
Club	Season	Division	Apps	Goals	Apps	Goals	Apps	Goals	Apps	Goals	Apps	Goals	Apps	Goals
NT Reality Wofoo Tai Po	2008–09	First Division	2	0	0	0	2	0	—	—	N/A	N/A	4	0
NT Reality Wofoo Tai Po	2009–10	First Division	3	0	1	0	—	—	1	0	N/A	N/A	4	0
NT Reality Wofoo Tai Po	2010–11	First Division	6	0	1	0	1	0	—	—	N/A	N/A	8	0
Wofoo Tai Po	2011–12	First Division	4	0	0	0	0	0	—	—	N/A	N/A	4	0
Tai Po Total			15	0	2	0	3	0	1	0	0	0	20	0
Sunray Cave JC Sun Hei	2012–13	First Division	10	0	1	0	0	0	4	0	N/A	N/A	15	0
Sun Hei Total			10	0	1	0	0	0	4	0	0	0	15	0
Yuen Long	2013–14	First Division	0	0	0	0	—	—	—	—	N/A	N/A	0	0
Yuen Long	2014–15	First Division	15	1	3	0	4	0	1	0			23	1
Yuen Long Total			15	1	3	0	4	0	1	0	0	0	23	1
South China	2015–16	First Division	5	0	1	0	1	0	2	0			9	0
South China Total			5	0	1	0	1	0	2	0	0	0	9	0
Pegasus	2016–17	First Division	16	0	1	0	—	—	—	—			17	0
Pegasus	2017–18	First Division	15	1	3	0	—	—	—	—			18	1
Pegasus	2018–19	First Division	14	1	2	0	—	—	—	—			16	1
Pegasus	2019–20	First Division	7	0	1	0	—	—	—	—			8	0
Pegasus Total			52	2	7	0	0	0	0	0	0	0	59	2
Yuen Long	2020–21	First Division												
Career Total			97	3	14	0	8	0	8	0	0	0	126	3

^{1} Others include Hong Kong season play-offs.

== Honours ==
=== Club ===
Tai Po

- Hong Kong FA Cup: 2008–09

=== International ===
Hong Kong

- Guangdong–Hong Kong Cup: 2018
