= Rian Marques =

Brazilian footballer

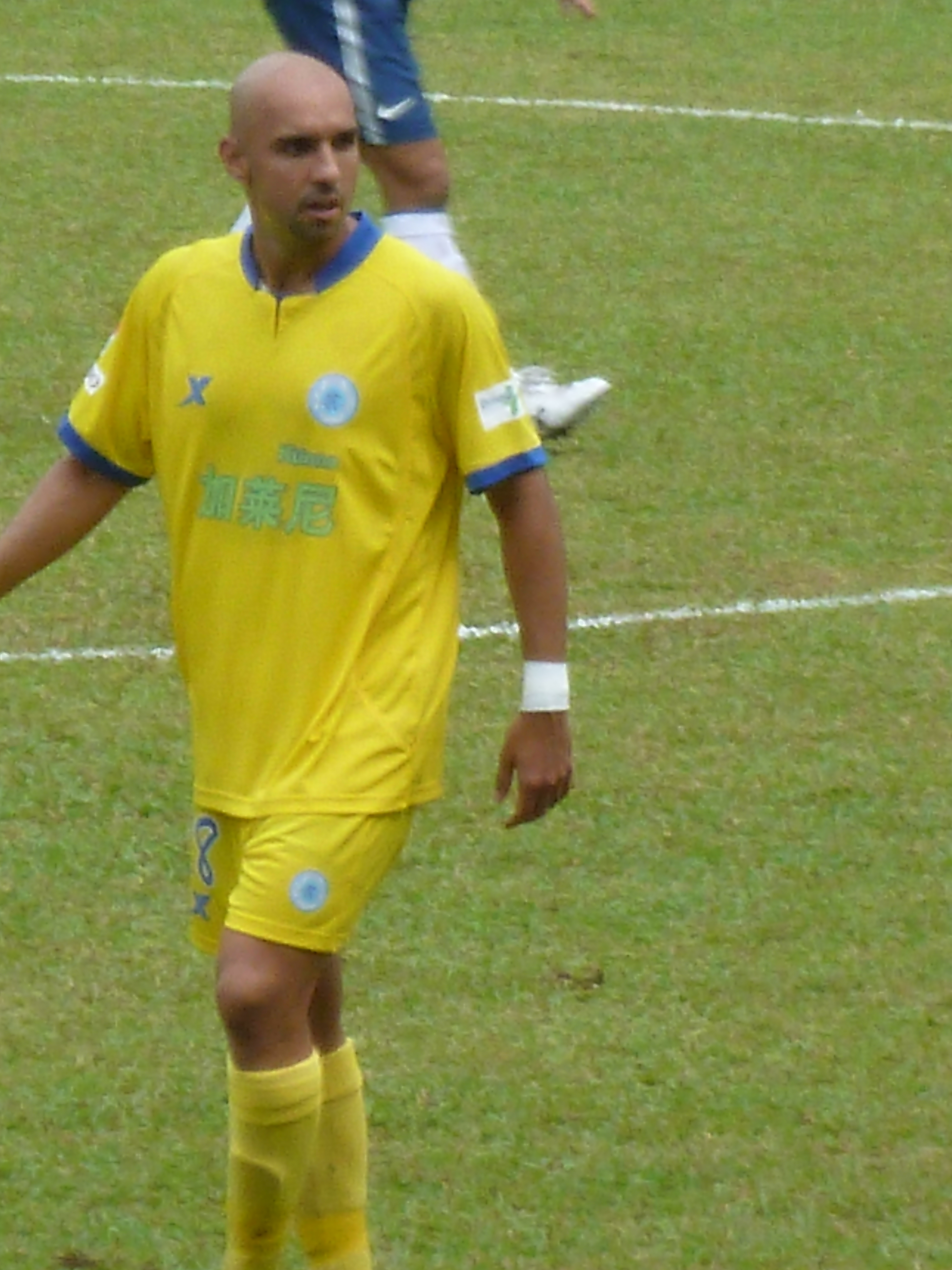

Personal information
- Full name: Rian de Souza Marques
- Date of birth: 28 August 1982 (age 44)
- Place of birth: Rio de Janeiro, Brazil
- Height: 1.80 m (5 ft 11 in)
- Position: Midfielder

Team information
- Current team: Thai Honda
- Number: 5

Senior career*
Years	Team	Apps	(Gls)
1997–1998	Botafogo F.R. (Youth team)		
1998–2000	PSV Eindhoven (Youth team)		
2000–2002	K.V. Turnhout		
2003–2004	Juventud Retalteca		
2005–2008	Pallo-Iirot		
2009–2010	Al-Mesaimeer Sports Club		
2010–2011	Al-Shamal Sports Club		
2011–2012	Bangkok United		
2012–2012	Nakhon Ratchasima FC		
2013–2013	Hong Kong Rangers	2	(1)
2013–2014	Yuen Long	13	(1)
2014–2015	Thai Honda		
- * Club domestic league appearances and goals

Rian de Souza Marques (born 1982 in Rio de Janeiro, Brazil), commonly known as Rian Marques, is a Brazilian footballer who currently plays for Thailand Yamaha League 1 club Thai Honda as a midfielder.

== Football career ==
=== Begin ===
He began his career in Botafogo F.R. youth team in 1997. He was transferred to Europe in 1998 to PSV Eindhoven youth team and began his career as professional one year after in Belgium for K.F.C. Turnhout (today's K.V. Turnhout).

=== Guatemala and Finland ===
After this season he played to Guatemala in Juventud Retalteca and the next season he returned to Europe to play in Finland in the squad of Pallo-Iirot.

=== Qatar ===
After his great season in Finland he was transferred to Qatar. His first club in Qatar was Al-Mesaimeer. After the great season he was transferred to Al-Shamal who was interested in him and he signed a two-years contract.

=== Thailand ===
After three years in Qatar, he had an offer to play in Thailand at Bangkok United, where he played for five months, being sold to Nakhon Ratchasima the same country.

=== Hong Kong ===
On 20 July 2013, he joined Hong Kong First Division League club Hong Kong Rangers for an undisclosed fee. On 18 September 2013, he was announced on Facebook Page of Yuen Long District SA, also Hong Kong First Division League club.

=== Thailand ===
After almost one year in Hong Kong, he moves back to the Thailand. This time is to play in Thai Honda, a club in Yamaha League 1 and sponsored by Honda Motor.

== Honours ==
PSV Eindhoven
- Philips Cup

Winner: 1999

Turnhout
- Antwerpen Tournament

Winner: 2002

Al-Mesaimeer
- Qatargas League

3rd Place: 2009–10

Al-Shamal
- Qatargas League

Runner-Up: 2010–11

Thai Honda F.C.
- Regional League Bangkok Area Division

Champion: 2014
