= Chung Wai Ho =

Hong Kong footballer

Personal information
- Full name: Chung Wai Ho
- Date of birth: 17 November 1990 (age 35)
- Place of birth: Hong Kong
- Height: 1.77 m (5 ft 10 in)
- Position: Goalkeeper

Senior career*
Years	Team	Apps	(Gls)
2008–2009	Eastern	0	(0)
2009–2013	Gospel	59	(0)
2013–2014	Yuen Long	1	(0)
2014–2015	Yau Tsim Mong	19	(0)
2015–2016	Citizen	25	(0)
2016–2017	Wong Tai Sin	14	(0)
2017–2018	Citizen	26	(0)
2018–2021	Happy Valley	28	(0)
2021–2024	Kowloon City	47	(0)
2024	South China	6	(0)
2025–	Kui Tan	4	(0)
- * Club domestic league appearances and goals as of 16 May 2026

Chung Wai Ho (Chinese: 鍾偉豪; born 17 November 1990) is a former Hong Kong professional footballer who played as a goalkeeper.

== Club career ==
Chung started his professional career with Eastern.

In 2013, he signed for Yuen Long, where he made only one appearance.

After that, he also played for Yau Tsim Mong and Citizen.

In 2018, he signed for Happy Valley.

On 3 September 2021, Chung announced that he was retiring from professional football to focus on his day job while continuing as an amateur player for Kowloon City.
