= Hui Wang Fung =

Hong Kong association football player

Hui Wang Fung 許宏鋒
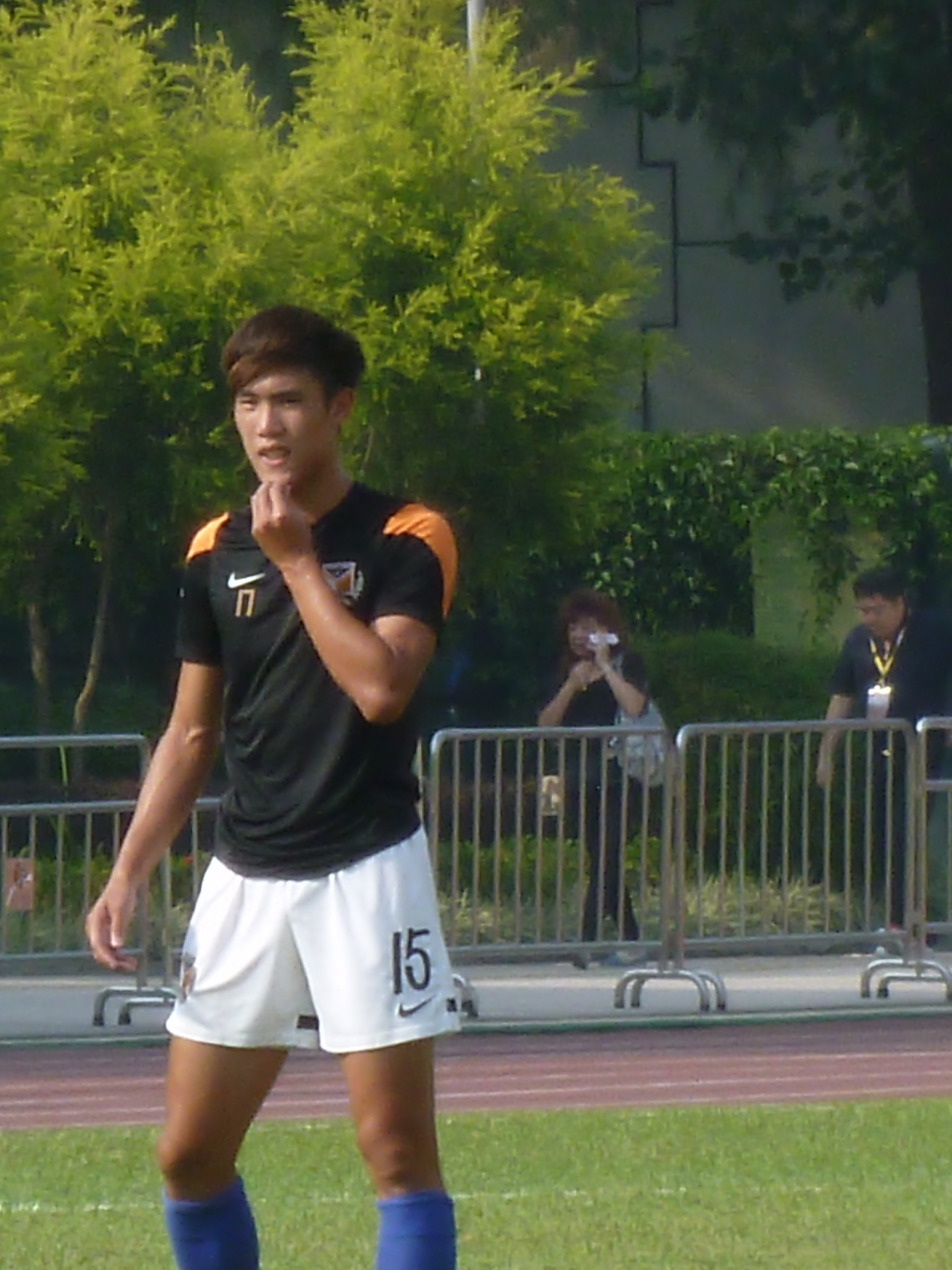

Personal information
- Full name: Wayne Hui Wang Fung
- Date of birth: 4 February 1994 (age 32)
- Place of birth: Hong Kong
- Height: 1.78 m (5 ft 10 in)
- Positions: Full-back; midfielder; winger

Team information
- Current team: Kui Tan
- Number: 12

Youth career
- 2006–2009: Kitchee
- 2009–2012: Rangers (HKG)

Senior career*
Years	Team	Apps	(Gls)
2012–2013	Yokohama FC Hong Kong	3	(0)
2013–2014	Yuen Long	12	(1)
2014–2015	Citizen	20	(18)
2015–2016	Rangers (HKG)	16	(1)
2016–2021	Southern	71	(4)
2021–2022	Kowloon City	12	(14)
2022–2025	Central & Western District	69	(43)
2025–	Kui Tan	22	(22)
- * Club domestic league appearances and goals as of 24 May 2026

Wayne Hui Wang Fung (Chinese: 許宏鋒; born 4 February 1994 in Hong Kong) is a former Hong Kong professional footballer who currently plays as an amateur for Hong Kong Second Division club Kui Tan. A versatile player, Hui has played in multiple positions, including wing, in midfield and at full back.

== Club career ==
In 2012, Hui signed for Hong Kong First Division club Yokohama FC Hong Kong.

In 2013, Hui signed for another Hong Kong First Division club Yuen Long.

On 29 September 2013, Hui scored his first goal in Hong Kong First Division against Happy Valley, which Yuen Long draws the match 2–2.

In 2014, Hui signed for Hong Kong First Division club Citizen. He scored 18 goals in 20 games and became the top scorer in the league among the local players.

In February 2015, Hui went to North American Soccer League club Fort Lauderdale Strikers to have a training for two to three weeks.

In 2015, Hui signed for Hong Kong Premier League club Rangers. On 13 September 2015, Hui scored his first goal in HKPL against Eastern, which lost the match 1–2.

In June 2016, Hui signed for Southern.
