= Zhu Zhengrong =

Chinese footballer

Zhu Zhengrong 朱峥嵘
Personal information
- Full name: Zhu Zhengrong
- Date of birth: 11 October 1988 (age 38)
- Place of birth: Shanghai, China
- Height: 1.83 m (6 ft 0 in)
- Positions: Forward; winger

Youth career
- 2000–2004: Genbao Football Academy

Senior career*
Years	Team	Apps	(Gls)
2004–2005	Shanghai Wicrrun		
2006–2018	Shanghai SIPG	145	(28)
2016	→ Meizhou Hakka (loan)	15	(2)
2017	→ Suzhou Dongwu (loan)	22	(8)
2018	→ Nantong Zhiyun (loan)	28	(10)
2019–2022	Kunshan FC	57	(13)
- * Club domestic league appearances and goals as of 25 December 2022

Zhu Zhengrong (Chinese: 朱峥嵘; pinyin: Zhū Zhēngróng; born 11 October 1988) is a Chinese former footballer who played as a forward or winger.

== Club career ==
Zhu Zhengrong joined the Genbao Football Academy in 2000. He left the academy to join China League Two club Shanghai Wicrrun in May 2004 and returned to academy in December 2005. He was promoted to Shanghai East Asia's first team for the 2006 season. Zhu played as a regular starter at the striker position and scored nine goals as Shanghai was promoted to the second tier in the 2007 season. On 29 September 2012, Zhu scored a goal for Shanghai in a 3-0 win against Harbin Yiteng which was enough to secure the club promotion to the top flight.

On 18 November 2014 Shanghai would be taken over by Shanghai International Port Group who immediately invested significantly in player recruitment to push for the league title. They would bring in Ghanaian international forward Asamoah Gyan in the 2015 Chinese Super League. This resulted in significantly less playing time for Zhu and on 22 June 2016 he was loaned to China League One side Meizhou Hakka until 31 December 2016. In March 2017, Zhu was loaned to League Two side Suzhou Dongwu until 31 December 2017. In March 2018, Zhu was loaned to Nantong Zhiyun until 31 December 2018.

On 2 March 2019, Zhu transferred to China League Two side Kunshan FC. He would be part of the team that gained promotion to the second tier at the end of the 2019 China League Two campaign. He would go on to establish himself as regular within the team and was part of the squad that won the division and promotion to the top tier at the end of the 2022 China League One campaign.

== Career statistics ==
Statistics accurate as of match played 25 December 2022.

Appearances and goals by club, season and competition
Club	Season	League			National Cup		Continental		Other		Total	
Club	Season	Division	Apps	Goals	Apps	Goals	Apps	Goals	Apps	Goals	Apps	Goals
Shanghai Wicrrun	2004	China League Two			-		-		-			
Shanghai Wicrrun	2005	China League Two			-		-		-			
Shanghai Wicrrun	Total				0	0	0	0	0	0		
Shanghai SIPG	2006	China League Two			-		-		-			
Shanghai SIPG	2007	China League Two			-		-		-			
Shanghai SIPG	2008	China League One	20	3	-		-		-		20	3
Shanghai SIPG	2009	China League One	20	6	-		-		-		20	6
Shanghai SIPG	2010	China League One	15	2	-		-		-		15	2
Shanghai SIPG	2011	China League One	21	3	2	0	-		-		23	3
Shanghai SIPG	2012	China League One	27	6	1	0	-		-		28	6
Shanghai SIPG	2013	Chinese Super League	28	6	1	0	-		-		29	6
Shanghai SIPG	2014	Chinese Super League	13	2	0	0	-		-		13	2
Shanghai SIPG	2015	Chinese Super League	1	0	1	0	-		-		2	0
Shanghai SIPG	2016	Chinese Super League	0	0	0	0	1	0	-		1	0
Shanghai SIPG	Total		145	28	5	0	1	0	0	0	151	28
Meizhou Hakka (loan)	2016	China League One	15	2	0	0	-		-		15	2
Suzhou Dongwu (loan)	2017	China League Two	22	8	3	0	-		-		25	8
Nantong Zhiyun (loan)	2018	China League Two	28	10	4	1	-		-		32	11
Kunshan FC	2019	China League Two	31	10	0	0	-		-		31	10
Kunshan FC	2020	China League One	8	0	0	0	-		-		8	0
Kunshan FC	2021	China League One	18	3	1	0	-		-		19	3
Kunshan FC	2022	China League One	0	0	1	0	-		-		1	0
Kunshan FC	Total		57	13	2	0	0	0	0	0	59	13
Career total			267	61	14	1	1	0	0	0	282	62

== Honours ==
=== Club ===
Shanghai SIPG

- China League One: 2012
- China League Two: 2007

Kunshan

- China League One: 2022
