= 40th Guangdong–Hong Kong Cup =

- Event: Guangdong–Hong Kong Cup
Hong Kong	Guangdong
2	2
- Hong Kong won 4–2 on penalties

First leg
Hong Kong	Guangdong
2	0
- Date: 4 January 2018
- Venue: Hong Kong Stadium, So Kon Po, Hong Kong
- Referee: Ng Chiu Kok
- Attendance: 5,341

Second leg
Guangdong	Hong Kong
2	0
- Date: 7 January 2018
- Venue: Guangdong Provincial People's Stadium, Guangzhou, Guangdong
- Referee: Ai Kun

The 40th Guangdong–Hong Kong Cup was held on 4 and 7 January 2018. Hong Kong won their first title in five years after beating Guangdong in the penalty shoot-out.

== Squads ==
=== Guangdong ===
- Head coach: Chen Yuliang
- Assistant coach: Chi Minghua, Yang Pengfeng, Chen Daying, Wu Yaqi

No.	Pos.	Player	Date of birth (age)	Caps	Club
1	GK	Hou Yu	20 December 1990 (aged 27)		(China) Meizhou Hakka
3	DF	Guo Zichao	25 January 1989 (aged 28)		(China) Jiangxi Liansheng
5	MF	Zhu Haiwei	9 October 1991 (aged 26)		Hebei China Fortune
7	MF	Zeng Chao	23 January 1993 (aged 24)		(China) Meixian Techand
8	FW	Peng Junxian	4 January 1997 (aged 21)		(China) Guangzhou Evergrande
9	FW	Xiao Zhi	28 May 1985 (aged 32)		(China) Guangzhou R&F
10	MF	Ye Chugui	8 September 1994 (aged 23)		(China) Guangzhou R&F
11	FW	Liang Xueming	2 August 1995 (aged 22)		(China) Guizhou Hengfeng
12	GK	Mai Gaoling	12 September 1998 (aged 19)		(China) Guangzhou Evergrande
14	DF	Huang Yuanqiang	25 March 1997 (aged 20)		(China) Guangzhou Evergrande
17	MF	Yu Jianfeng	29 January 1989 (aged 28)		(China) Nantong Zhiyun
18	MF	Deng Yubiao	8 June 1997 (aged 20)		(China) Guangzhou Evergrande
19	DF	Lin Juyuan	18 March 1993 (aged 24)		(China) Meizhou Hakka
23	MF	Lu Lin (Captain)	3 February 1985 (aged 32)		(China) Guangzhou R&F
24	MF	Hu Weiwei	3 March 1993 (aged 24)		(China) Qingdao Jonoon
25	GK	Han Feng	5 December 1983 (aged 34)		(China) Guangzhou R&F
26	FW	Yang Chaosheng	22 July 1993 (aged 24)		(China) Guangzhou Evergrande
27	MF	Zhong Juzhan	29 April 1993 (aged 24)		Hebei China Fortune
32	MF	Chen Zhizhao	14 March 1988 (aged 29)		(China) Guangzhou R&F
35	MF	Mai Jiajian	19 October 1995 (aged 22)		(China) Guangzhou R&F
55	DF	Tu Dongxu	13 November 1991 (aged 26)		(China) Meixian Techand

=== Hong Kong ===
The final 21-man squad of Hong Kong was announced on 31 December 2017 and was composed of entirely local players.

- Head Coach: Kwok Kar Lok

No.	Pos.	Player	Date of birth (age)	Caps	Club
1	GK	Yuen Ho Chun	19 July 1995 (aged 22)		Hong Kong Pegasus
2	DF	Tsui Wang Kit	5 January 1997 (aged 20)		Hong Kong Rangers
3	DF	Chak Ting Fung	27 November 1989 (aged 28)		(Hong Kong) Tai Po
4	DF	Cheung Chi Yung (Captain)	10 June 1989 (aged 28)		Hong Kong Pegasus
5	DF	Leung Kwun Chung	1 April 1992 (aged 25)		(Hong Kong) Tai Po
6	MF	Ngan Lok Fung	26 January 1993 (aged 24)		(Hong Kong) Lee Man
7	FW	Chuck Yiu Kwok	29 May 1994 (aged 23)		Hong Kong Rangers
8	MF	Tam Lok Hin	12 January 1991 (aged 26)		(Hong Kong) Yuen Long
9	FW	Lo Kong Wai	19 June 1992 (aged 25)		(Hong Kong) Eastern
10	MF	Michael Luk	22 August 1986 (aged 31)		(Hong Kong) Southern District
11	MF	Wong Tsz Ho	7 March 1994 (aged 23)		(Hong Kong) Eastern
12	MF	Lai Lok Yin	20 July 1995 (aged 22)		Hong Kong Rangers
14	DF	Fong Pak Lun	14 April 1993 (aged 24)		Hong Kong Pegasus
15	DF	Lau Hok Ming	19 October 1995 (aged 22)		(Hong Kong) Southern District
16	MF	Li Ngai Hoi	15 October 1994 (aged 23)		Hong Kong Pegasus
17	MF	Cheng Chin Lung	7 January 1998 (aged 19)		(Hong Kong) Dreams
18	GK	Tse Ka Wing	4 September 1999 (aged 18)		(Hong Kong) Dreams
19	GK	Chan Ka Ho	27 January 1996 (aged 21)		(Hong Kong) Yuen Long
20	FW	Yuen Chun Sing	16 February 1993 (aged 24)		(Hong Kong) Tai Po
21	DF	Tse Long Hin	6 February 1995 (aged 22)		(Hong Kong) Lee Man
22	MF	Wu Chun Ming	21 November 1997 (aged 20)		Hong Kong Pegasus

== Match details ==
=== First leg ===
4 January 2018
20:00 UTC+8

Hong Kong	2–0	Guangdong
Cheung Chi Yung 79'; Chuck Yiu Kwok 90+2'	Report	Tu Dongxu (yellow card) 26'; Zhu Haiwei (yellow card) 78'; Lin Juyuan (yellow card) 84'; Hu Weiwei (yellow card) 89'

Hong Kong Stadium, So Kon Po, Hong Kong
Attendance: 5,341
Referee: Ng Chiu Kok (Hong Kong)

=== Second leg ===
7 January 2018
15:30 UTC+8

Guangdong	2–0 (a.e.t.)	Hong Kong
Lu Lin 40' (pen.); Chak Ting Fung 68' (o.g.); Lu Lin (yellow card) 103'; Chen Zhizhao (yellow card) 105'; Tu Dongxu (yellow card) 108'	Report	Yuen Ho Chun (yellow card) 54'; Leung Kwun Chung (yellow card) 67'; Michael Luk (yellow card) 70'; Wong Tsz Ho (yellow card) 90+5'
Penalties
Lu Lin (penalty missed); Xiao Zhi (penalty scored); Yang Chaosheng (penalty missed); Liang Xueming (penalty scored)	2 – 4	(penalty scored) Leung Kwun Chung; (penalty missed) Chuck Yiu Kwok; (penalty scored) Li Ngai Hoi; (penalty scored) Wong Tsz Ho; (penalty scored) Tse Long Hin

Guangdong Provincial People's Stadium, Guangzhou, Guangdong
Referee: Ai Kun (China PR)
