= Zhenjiang Groupway F.C. =

Chinese football club

Zhenjiang Groupway 镇江中安
- Full name: Zhenjiang Groupway FC Co., Ltd. 镇江中安足球俱乐部
- Founded: 2002; 23 years ago
- Dissolved: January 2008; 17 years ago
- Ground: Jurong District Stadium, Zhenjiang, China
- League: China Yi League
- 2007: 7th, Northern Group
Home colours	Away colours

Zhenjiang Groupway Football Club (Simplified Chinese: 镇江中安足球俱乐部) is a former football club based in Zhenjiang, Jiangsu, China who played in the Jurong District Stadium.

== History ==
The club was founded in 2002 as Shanghai Wicrrun and played in Chinese Yi League in the 2004 season.

Before the 2007 season, they moved to the city of Zhenjiang and renamed themselves Zhenjiang Groupway, then played one more season in the China League Two where they finished seventh in the Northern Group of the division.

In January 2008, the club would merge into neighboring club Suzhou Trips. In 2009 Suzhou Trips would then go on to merge into Ningbo Huaao and the last remnant of Zhenjiang Groupway would cease to exist.

== Name history ==
- 2002–2006 Shanghai Wicrrun F.C. 上海维润
- 2007–2008 Zhenjiang Groupway F.C. 镇江中安

== See also ==
- Suzhou Trips
- Ningbo Huaao
