= Suzhou Trips F.C. =

Chinese football club

Suzhou Trips Sūzhōu Qùpǔshì 苏州趣普仕
- Full name: Suzhou Trips FC 苏州趣普仕派尔劲足球俱乐部
- Founded: January 2004; 21 years ago
- Dissolved: 2009; 16 years ago
- Ground: Suzhou Sports Center, Suzhou, China
- Capacity: 30,000
- Chairman: Guan Minghua
- Manager: Zhu Mingliang
- League: China Yi League
- 2007: 6th, Southern Group
| Home colours | Away colours |

Suzhou Trips Football Club (simplified Chinese: 苏州趣普仕; traditional Chinese: 蘇州趣普仕; pinyin: Sūzhōu Qùpǔshì) is a former Chinese football club based in Suzhou, Jiangsu who played in the Suzhou Sports Center. Founded in January, 2004 the club entered at the bottom of the Chinese football league pyramid where they stayed throughout their entire existence. The club brought in former Asian Footballer of the Year winner Fan Zhiyi as their technical director to raise their profile and performances of the club, however this ended up being highly disruptive and caused the club to get into debt. In their hopes to win promotion they would merge with another third-tier club Zhenjiang Groupway FC and then this would following with another merging with Ningbo Huaao football club at the beginning of the 2010 league season.

== Results ==
- As of the end of 2009 season

All-Time League rankings

| Season | 2005 | 2006 | 2007 | 2008 |
|---|---|---|---|---|
| Division | 3 | 3 | 3 | 3 |
| Position | 8^{1} | 8^{1} | 6^{1} | 5^{1} |

- ^Note 1 : in group stage

== See also ==
- Zhenjiang Groupway FC
- Ningbo Huaao
