= Zhan Yilin =

Chinese footballer

Zhan Yilin 战怡麟
Personal information
- Date of birth: 20 September 1989 (age 37)
- Place of birth: Shanghai, China
- Height: 1.73 m (5 ft 8 in)
- Position: Forward

Youth career
- 2000–2005: Genbao Football Academy

Senior career*
Years	Team	Apps	(Gls)
2006–2012	Shanghai East Asia	84	(4)
2013–2019	Shanghai Shenhua	41	(0)
2017	→ Shanghai JuJu Sports (loan)	19	(2)
- * Club domestic league appearances and goals as of 31 December 2019

Zhan Yilin (Chinese: 战怡麟; pinyin: Zhàn Yílín; born 20 September 1989) is a Chinese former football player.

== Club career ==
Born in Shanghai, Zhan joined Genbao Football Academy in July 2000 and was promoted to Shanghai East Asia squad in 2006 for the China League Two campaign. He mainly played as a left winger or left back and sometimes played as a backup for Wu Lei in the club. On 31 May 2008, Zhan scored his first goal in the China League One in a 2–1 home victory against Sichuan FC. This goal was scored within just 16 seconds after kick off, which beat the previous record of 18 seconds set by Sabin Ilie of Changchun Yatai in the 2005 season and became the fastest goal in the China League One. He appeared in 22 league matches in the 2012 season, as Shanghai East Asia won the champions and promoted to the top flight.

Zhan transferred to Chinese Super League side Shanghai Shenhua in February 2013. He was sent to the reserved team in 2016 and 2018.

== Career statistics ==
Statistics accurate as of match played 31 December 2019.

Appearances and goals by club, season and competition
Club	Season	League			National Cup		Continental		Other		Total	
Club	Season	Division	Apps	Goals	Apps	Goals	Apps	Goals	Apps	Goals	Apps	Goals
Shanghai East Asia	2006	China League Two			-		-		-			
Shanghai East Asia	2007	China League Two			-		-		-			
Shanghai East Asia	2008	China League One	20	1	-		-		-		20	1
Shanghai East Asia	2009	China League One	22	3	-		-		-		22	3
Shanghai East Asia	2010	China League One	2	0	-		-		-		2	0
Shanghai East Asia	2011	China League One	18	0	2	0	-		-		20	0
Shanghai East Asia	2012	China League One	22	0	2	0	-		-		24	0
Shanghai East Asia	Total		84	4	4	0	0	0	0	0	88	4
Shanghai Shenhua	2013	Chinese Super League	16	0	1	0	-		-		17	0
Shanghai Shenhua	2014	Chinese Super League	20	0	4	0	-		-		24	0
Shanghai Shenhua	2015	Chinese Super League	3	0	2	0	-		-		5	0
Shanghai Shenhua	2019	Chinese Super League	2	0	0	0	-		-		2	0
Shanghai Shenhua	Total		41	0	7	0	0	0	0	0	48	0
Shanghai JuJu Sports (loan)	2017	China League Two	19	2	1	0	-		-		20	2
Career total			144	6	12	0	0	0	0	0	156	6

== Honours ==
Shanghai East Asia

- China League One: 2012
- China League Two: 2007
