= Sun Le (footballer) =

Chinese footballer

Sun Le 孙乐
Personal information
- Date of birth: September 17, 1989 (age 37)
- Place of birth: Shijiazhuang, Hebei, China
- Height: 1.88 m (6 ft 2 in)
- Position: Goalkeeper

Team information
- Current team: Shijiazhuang Gongfu (goalkeeping coach)

Youth career
- Hebei Youth

Senior career*
Years	Team	Apps	(Gls)
2008	Shijiazhuang Tiangong		(0)
2010–2020	Shanghai SIPG	28	(0)
2021–2022	Suzhou Dongwu	44	(0)
2023	Nantong Zhiyun	0	(0)
2023–2024	Shijiazhuang Gongfu	2	(0)

Managerial career
- 2025–: Shijiazhuang Gongfu (goalkeeping)
- * Club domestic league appearances and goals as of 8 December 2022

Sun Le (Chinese: 孙乐; pinyin: Sūn Lè; born 17 September 1989 in Shijiazhuang) is a Chinese former football player and existing assistant coach of Shijiazhuang Gongfu.

== Club career ==
Sun started his football career in 2008 when he played in his hometown club Shijiazhuang Tiangong in the China League Two. After Shijiazhuang Tiangong dissolved in 2009, he was linked with Dalian Aerbin and Shanghai Shenhua. Sun chose to join China League One club Shanghai East Asia in early 2010. He played as a second choice goalkeeper in Shanghai. Sun made 7 league appearances in the 2012 season, as Shanghai East Asia won the champions and promoted to the top flight.

== Career statistics ==
Statistics accurate as of match played 8 December 2022.

Appearances and goals by club, season and competition
Club	Season	League			National Cup		Continental		Other		Total	
Club	Season	Division	Apps	Goals	Apps	Goals	Apps	Goals	Apps	Goals	Apps	Goals
Shijiazhuang Tiangong	2008	China League Two		0	-		-		-			0
Shanghai SIPG	2010	China League One	5	0	-		-		-		5	0
Shanghai SIPG	2011	China League One	8	0	2	0	-		-		10	0
Shanghai SIPG	2012	China League One	7	0	2	0	-		-		9	0
Shanghai SIPG	2013	Chinese Super League	7	0	1	0	-		-		8	0
Shanghai SIPG	2014	Chinese Super League	0	0	1	0	-		-		1	0
Shanghai SIPG	2015	Chinese Super League	0	0	1	0	-		-		1	0
Shanghai SIPG	2016	Chinese Super League	0	0	0	0	1	0	-		1	0
Shanghai SIPG	2017	Chinese Super League	0	0	0	0	1	0	-		1	0
Shanghai SIPG	2018	Chinese Super League	1	0	0	0	1	0	-		2	0
Shanghai SIPG	2019	Chinese Super League	0	0	0	0	0	0	0 (Note: Appearances in Chinese FA Super Cup)	0	0	0
Shanghai SIPG	2020	Chinese Super League	0	0	0	0	1	0	-		1	0
Shanghai SIPG	Total		28	0	7	0	4	0	0	0	39	0
Suzhou Gongwu	2021	China League One	28	0	1	0	-		-		29	0
Suzhou Gongwu	2022	China League One	16	0	0	0	-		-		16	0
Suzhou Gongwu	Total		44	0	1	0	0	0	0	0	45	0
Career total			72	0	8	0	4	0	0	0	84	0

== Honours ==
=== Club ===
Shanghai SIPG

- Chinese Super League: 2018
- China League One: 2012
