= Mao Jiakang =

Chinese footballer

Mao Jiakang 毛嘉康
Personal information
- Date of birth: 17 January 1991 (age 35)
- Place of birth: Shanghai, China
- Height: 1.85 m (6 ft 1 in)
- Position: Forward

Youth career
- 2000–2005: Genbao Football Academy

Senior career*
Years	Team	Apps	(Gls)
2006–2016	Shanghai East Asia	24	(1)
2014	→ Hunan Billows (loan)	21	(3)
2016–2018	Nantong Zhiyun	7	(0)
- * Club domestic league appearances and goals as of 4 November 2018

Mao Jiakang (Chinese: 毛嘉康; pinyin: Máo Jiākāng; born 17 January 1991 in Shanghai) is a Chinese former football player who played as a forward.

== Club career ==
Born in Shanghai, Mao joined Genbao Football Academy in 2000 and was promoted to Shanghai East Asia squad in 2006 for the China League Two campaign. He was described by academy's head master Xu Genbao as being a hot prospect for the future. However, he struggled from lingering injury and faced fierce competition in the forward position and could just make a few appearances for the club. On 19 September 2009, he scored his first goal in the League One, in a 2–1 away victory against Anhui Jiufang. Mao made one appearance in the 2012 season, as Shanghai East Asia won the champions and promoted to the top flight. In February 2014, Mao moved to China League One side Hunan Billows on a one-year loan deal.

In June 2016, Mao left Shanghai SIPG and transferred to China League Two side Nantong Zhiyun.

== Club career statistics ==
Statistics accurate as of match played 4 November 2018.

Club performance			League		Cup		League Cup		Continental		Total	
Season	Club	League	Apps	Goals	Apps	Goals	Apps	Goals	Apps	Goals	Apps	Goals
China PR			League		FA Cup		CSL Cup		Asia		Total	
2006	Shanghai East Asia	China League Two			-		-		-			
2007	Shanghai East Asia	China League Two			-		-		-			
2008	Shanghai East Asia	China League One	0	0	-		-		-		0	0
2009	Shanghai East Asia	China League One	3	1	-		-		-		3	1
2010	Shanghai East Asia	China League One	6	0	-		-		-		6	0
2011	Shanghai East Asia	China League One	5	0	1	0	-		-		6	0
2012	Shanghai East Asia	China League One	1	0	2	1	-		-		3	1
2013	Shanghai East Asia	Chinese Super League	9	0	2	1	-		-		11	1
2014	Hunan Billows	China League One	21	3	1	0	-		-		22	3
2015	Shanghai SIPG	Chinese Super League	0	0	0	0	-		-		0	0
2016	Nantong Zhiyun	China League Two	4	0	0	0	-		-		4	0
2017	Nantong Zhiyun	China League Two	3	0	0	0	-		-		3	0
2018	Nantong Zhiyun	China League Two	0	0	0	0	-		-		0	0
Total	China PR		52	4	6	2	0	0	0	0	58	6

== Honours ==
Shanghai East Asia

- China League One: 2012
- China League Two: 2007
