= Ningbo Huaao F.C. =

Chinese football club

Ningbo Huaao 宁波华奥
- Full name: Ningbo Huaao Football Club 宁波华奥足球俱乐部
- Founded: 2006; 19 years ago
- Dissolved: December 2009 (15 years ago)
- Ground: Ningbo Sports Development Centre Stadium; Ningbo, China
- Capacity: 25,000
- Chairman: Tan Xiaodong
- Manager: Lu Yiliang
- League: Chinese Yi League
- 2007: 5th, Southern Group
| Home colours | Away colours |

Ningbo Huaao Football Club (Simplified Chinese: 宁波华奥足球俱乐部) is a Chinese football club based in Ningbo, Zhejiang who play in the Ningbo Fubang Stadium in the Chinese Football Association Yi League. Starting in 2006 the club entered at the bottom of the Chinese football league pyramid where in their debt season they would qualify for the play-offs, yet were knocked out in the quarter-finals. In their attempt to win promotion they would merge with fellow third team football club Suzhou Trips in 2010.

== History ==
All-Time League rankings

| Season | 2006 | 2007 | 2008 | 2009 |
|---|---|---|---|---|
| Division | 3 | 3 | 3 | 3 |
| Position | 4^{1} | 5^{1} | 7^{1} | 6^{1} |

- ^Note 1 : in group stage

== See also ==
- Suzhou Trips
