= Yuanshen Sports Centre Stadium =

Sports venue in Shanghai, China

Coordinates: 31°14′0.33″N 121°31′54.06″E

Yuanshen Sports Centre Stadium 源深体育中心体育场
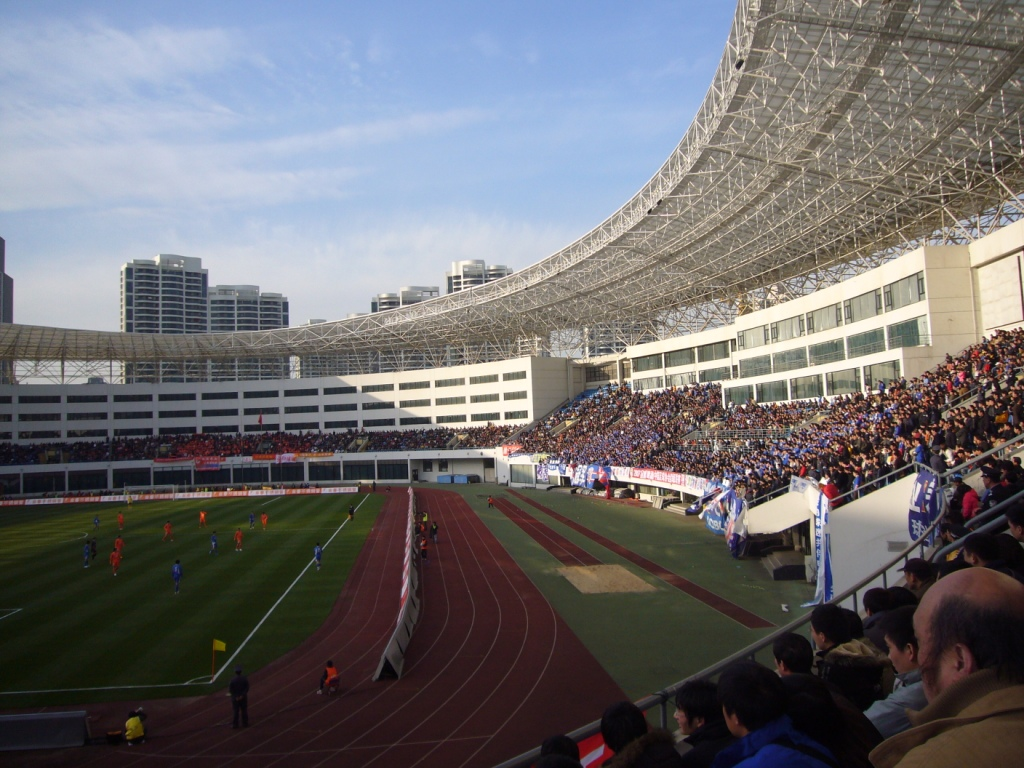
- Interactive map of Yuanshen Sports Centre Stadium 源深体育中心体育场
- Full name: Yuanshen Sports Centre Stadium
- Location: Pudong, Shanghai
- Capacity: 16,115
- Surface: Grass

Construction
- Opened: 2000

Tenants
- Shanghai Pudong (2000); Shanghai Zobon (2003–2005, 2009–2010); Shanghai United (2005–2006); Shanghai Shenhua (2006–2007); Shanghai Shenxin (2013, 2015); Shanghai SIPG (2020); Shanghai IMAIR (2026)

The Yuanshen Sports Centre Stadium (simplified Chinese: 源深体育中心体育场; traditional Chinese: 源深體育中心體育場) is a multi-purpose stadium in Shanghai. It is currently used mostly for association football matches. The stadium has a maximum seating capacity for 16,000 spectators.

Apart from the stadium there is a 5,000 seater Yuanshen Gymnasium which hosted Shanghai Sharks until 2021 and swimming pool.

== Events ==
- Super Show 2 by the South Korean boy band Super Junior on October 18, 2009, and the official opening performance of the 11th Shanghai International Art Festival, hosted by China's the Ministry of Culture.
- On April 19, 2008, the arena hosted Japanese rock band L'Arc-en-Ciel as part of their "TOUR 2008 L'7 ~Trans ASIA via PARIS~"
