= 2013 Shanghai Shenhua F.C. season =

Shanghai Shenhua 2013
- Chairman: Zhu Jun
- Manager: Sergio Batista (until 4 July 2013); Shen Xiangfu (from 5 July 2013)
- Super League: 8th
- FA Cup: Third round
- Top goalscorer: League: Firas Al-Khatib (11); All: Firas Al-Khatib (11)
- Highest home attendance: 23,457 vs Guangzhou Evergrande; 10 May 2013
- Lowest home attendance: 9,637 vs Liaoning Whowin; 31 March 2013
- Average home league attendance: 14,660
Home colours	Away colours

The 2013 Shanghai Shenhua season was Shanghai Shenhua's 10th season in the Chinese Super League and 51st overall in the Chinese top flight. They also competed in the Chinese FA Cup losing in the third round.

== Players ==
=== First team squad ===
Updated 4 March 2013.

Note: Flags indicate national team as defined under FIFA eligibility rules; some limited exceptions apply. Players may hold more than one non-FIFA nationality.

No.	Pos.	Nation	Player
1	GK	CHN	Wang Dalei
2	DF	ARG	Rolando Schiavi
4	DF	CHN	Li Jianbin (on loan from Guangzhou Evergrande)
5	DF	CHN	Dai Lin
7	MF	CHN	Wang Changqing
8	MF	CHN	Song Boxuan
9	FW	CPV	Dady
10	MF	COL	Giovanni Moreno
11	FW	SYR	Firas Al-Khatib
12	DF	CHN	Bai Jiajun
15	FW	CHN	Zhan Yilin
16	MF	CHN	Wang Fei
17	DF	CHN	Xiong Fei
19	DF	CHN	Zheng Kaimu
20	MF	CHN	Xu Liang

No.	Pos.	Nation	Player
21	MF	CHN	Jiang Kun
22	GK	CHN	Qiu Shengjiong
23	DF	CHN	Liu Jiashen
25	MF	CHN	Su Shun
27	MF	ARG	Patricio Toranzo
28	MF	CHN	Cao Yunding
29	MF	CHN	Wang Zhenyu
30	DF	CHN	Tao Jin
31	DF	CHN	Yuan Shaohua
32	MF	CHN	Liang Yu
33	MF	CHN	Yan Song
34	GK	CHN	Dong Hang
35	GK	CHN	Dong Guangxiang
36	MF	CHN	Wang Shouting

=== Reserve squad ===
Note: Flags indicate national team as defined under FIFA eligibility rules; some limited exceptions apply. Players may hold more than one non-FIFA nationality.

No.	Pos.	Nation	Player
41	MF	CHN	Bai Xuefeng
42	MF	CHN	Pan Jiyuan
43	DF	CHN	Cheng Zecheng
44	MF	CHN	Zhang Jiawei
45	DF	CHN	Yang Yufan

No.	Pos.	Nation	Player
46	MF	CHN	Li Hao
47	MF	CHN	Gu Xiaodong
48	MF	CHN	Wang Chen
49	GK	CHN	Zhou Ye
50	DF	CHN	Jin Chenchen

== Transfers ==
=== Winter ===
In:

No.	Pos.	Nation	Player
2	DF	ARG	Rolando Schiavi (from Boca Juniors)
4	DF	CHN	Li Jianbin (loan from Guangzhou Evergrande)
7	MF	CHN	Wang Changqing (from Beijing Guoan)
9	FW	CPV	Dady (from Apollon Limassol)
11	FW	SYR	Firas Al-Khatib (from Zaxo)
15	FW	CHN	Zhan Yilin (from Shanghai SIPG)
20	MF	CHN	Xu Liang (from Beijing Guoan)
27	MF	ARG	Patricio Toranzo (from Racing Club)

Out:

No.	Pos.	Nation	Player
3	DF	BRA	Moisés (to Portuguesa)
4	DF	CHN	Wang Lin (to Hangzhou Greentown)
11	FW	CIV	Didier Drogba (to Galatasaray)
13	DF	CHN	Cheng Liang (retired)
14	MF	CHN	Fei Yu (to Warta Poznań)
20	DF	CHN	Wu Xi (to Jiangsu Sainty)
21	MF	CHN	Wang Guanyi (to Tianjin Teda)
23	DF	CHN	Qiu Tianyi (to Wuhan Zall)
29	FW	AUS	Joel Griffiths (to Sydney FC)
31	MF	CHN	You Yuanwen (to Qingdao Hainiu)
39	FW	FRA	Nicolas Anelka (loan to Juventus)

== Competitions ==
=== Chinese Super League ===
==== Results summary ====
Overall								Home						Away					
Pld	W	D	L	GF	GA	GD	Pts	W	D	L	GF	GA	GD	W	D	L	GF	GA	GD
17	5	10	2	20	18	+2	25	4	4	1	10	8	+2	1	6	1	10	10	0

Last updated: 6 July 2013.
Source: [ World-Football.net]

==== Results by round ====
Round	1	2	3	4	5	6	7	8	9	10	11	12	13	14	15	16	17	18	19	20	21	22	23	24	25	26	27	28	29	30
Ground	H	A	H	A	H	A	H	A	H	A	H	A	H	A	H	A	H	A	H	A	H	A	H	A	H	A	H	A	H	A
Result	D	W	D	D	W	D	W	D	L	D	W	D	D	L	D	D	W	D	L	L	W	W	W	L	W	L	W	L	W	L
Position	15	15	15	14	11	12	9	10	12	11	9	9	12	13	13	12	11	11	12	12	11	8	7	8	6	8	6	7	5	8

Updated to match(es) played on 14 February 2013. Source: "Soccerway". Archived from the original on 9 February 2013.
A = Away; H = Home; W = Win; D = Draw; L = Loss

==== Results ====
9 March 2013 Round 1	Shanghai Shenhua	0–0	Tianjin Teda	Hongkou Football Stadium
19:45	Song Bouxan (yellow card) 46'; Schiavi (yellow card) 57'; Cao Yunding (yellow card) 66'; Dady (yellow card) 78'	Summary	Hu Rentian (yellow card) 23'; Jovančić (yellow card) 50'	Attendance: 10,236; Referee: Banjar Al Dosari

17 March 2013 Round 2	Shanghai Shenxin	0–1	Shanghai Shenhua	Jinshan Sports Centre
16:00	Zhu Baojie (yellow card) 15'; Xu Wen (red card) 77'	Summary	Toranzo 4'; Dai Lin (yellow card) 50'; Wang Shouting (yellow card) 73'	Attendance: 8,696; Referee: Abdulrahman Al Jassim

31 March 2013 Round 3	Shanghai Shenhua	2–2	Liaoning Whowin	Hongkou Football Stadium
19:45	Al-Khatib 62'; Wang Shouting (yellow card) 72'; Dady 86'	Report	Trifunović 17'; Ding Jie (yellow card) 19'; Chamanga (yellow card) 28'; Edu 38'; Yang Shanping (yellow card) 57'; Kim Tae-Yan (yellow card) 81'	Attendance: 9,637; Referee: Fan Qi

7 April 2013 Round 4	Hangzhou Greentown	0–0	Shanghai Shenhua	Yellow Dragon Sports Center
19:35	Marcelo (yellow card) 25'; Gao Di (yellow card) 37'	Summary	Song Boxuan (yellow card) 19'; Xiong Fei (yellow card) 39'; Bo Jiajun (yellow card) 68'	Attendance: 18,310; Referee: Zhou Gang

13 April 2013 Round 5	Shanghai Shenhua	2–1	Shandong Luneng	Hongkou Football Stadium
19:45	Wang Shouting (yellow card) 51'; Al-Khatib 60', 78'; Xu Liang (yellow card) 83'; Zheng Kaimu (yellow card) 90+1'; Wang Dalei (yellow card) 90+2'	Summary	Niculae 19'; Wang Yongpo (yellow card) 40'	Attendance: 12,430; Referee: Ali Shaban

21 April 2013 Round 6	Qingdao Jonoon	1–1	Shanghai Shenhua	Qingdao Tiantai Stadium
15:45	Guo Liang (yellow card) 34'; Mou Pengfei (yellow card) 88'	Summary	Li Jianbin 39' (o.g.); Li Jianbin (yellow card) 44'; Toranzo (yellow card) 51'; Song Boxuan (yellow card) 90'; Dady 90'	Attendance: 11,832; Referee: Ming Fu

28 April 2013 Round 7	Shanghai Shenhua	2–1	Shanghai SIPG	Hongkou Football Stadium
19:45	Cao Yunding (yellow card) 66'; Xu Liang 70'; Moreno 87' (yellow card) 88'	Summary	Wu Lei 40' (pen.) (yellow card) 48' (yellow-red card) 75'; Li Yunqiu (yellow card) 60'; Sun Kai (yellow card) 80'	Attendance: 22,356; Referee: Adham Makhadmeh

4 May 2013 Round 8	Wuhan Zall	3–3	Shanghai Shenhua	Wuhan Sports Center
15:35	Dembélé (yellow card) 40'; Zhu Ting 45', 51'; Li Xing 66'; Won-Hee Cho (yellow card) 77'	Summary	Bo Jiajun (yellow card) 30'; Schiavi (yellow card) 61'; Dady 70', 78'; Al-Khatib 83' (yellow card) 89'; Dai Lin (yellow card) 86'	Attendance: 16,853; Referee: Yoshiro Imamura

10 May 2013 Round 9	Shanghai Shenhua	0–3	Guangzhou Evergrande	Hongkou Football Stadium
19:45	Xu Liang (yellow card) 25'; Moreno (yellow card) 41'; Li Jianbin (yellow card) 59'; Dai Lin (yellow card) 89'	Summary	Qin Sheng (yellow card) 28'; Zhao Xuri (yellow card) 50'; Gao Lin 56', 84'; Zhang Linpeng 71'	Attendance: 23,457; Referee: Li Jun

18 May 2013 Round 10	Jiangsu Sainty	2–2	Shanghai Shenhua	Nanjing Olympic Sports Center
19:40	Lu Bofei 13' (pen.), 34' (pen.); Eleílson (yellow card) 71'	Summary	Dady 27'; Schiavi (yellow card) 32'; Dai Lin (yellow card) 33'; Xu Liang 41'; Xu Liang (yellow card) 43'	Attendance: 32,157; Referee: Fahad Al Oraini

25 May 2013 Round 11	Shanghai Shenhua	1–0	Beijing Guoan	Hongkou Football Stadium
19:45	Li Jianbin (yellow card) 7'; Moreno 63'; Xu Liang (yellow card) 69'	Summary	Lei Tenglong (yellow card) 9'; Piao Cheng (yellow card) 50'; Lima (yellow card) 50' (yellow-red card) 90+3'; Lang Zheng (yellow card) 66'	Attendance: 19,633; Referee: Brenton Haywood

1 June 2013 Round 12	Guizhou Renhe	2–2	Shanghai Shenhua	Guiyang Olympic Centre
16:00	Zhang Chenglin (yellow card) 46'; Rafa Jordà 64'; Sun Jihai 90'	Summary	Al-Khatib 8'; Moreno 19' (pen.)	Attendance: 18,356; Referee: Wang Jin

21 June 2013 Round 13	Shanghai Shenhua	0–0	Dalian Aerbin	Hongkou Football Stadium
19:45	Dady (yellow card) 59'; Bo Jiajun (yellow card) 70'; Wang Changqing (yellow card) 79'; Cao Yunding (yellow card) 88'; Dai Lin (yellow card) 90+2'; Al Khatib (yellow card) 90+4'	Report	Zhou Tong (yellow card) 9'; Li Xuepeng (yellow card) 50'; Utaka (yellow card) 65'; Kéita (yellow card) 90+2'	Attendance: 10,245; Referee: Xia Jun

26 June 2013 Round 14	Changchun Yatai	1–0	Shanghai Shenhua	Development Area Stadium
19:35	Ismailov (yellow card) 19'; Isac 40'; Song Zhenyu (yellow card) 83'; McKay (yellow card) 90+1'	Report	Wang Shouting (yellow card) 56' (yellow-red card) 90+2'	Attendance: 11,246; Referee: Guo Baolong

30 June 2013 Round 15	Shanghai Shenhua	1–1	Guangzhou R&F	Hongkou Football Stadium
19:45	Al Khatib 43' (pen.)	Report	Coelho 19'; Xu Bo (yellow card) 25'; Jiang Ning (yellow card) 54'	Attendance: 8,756; Referee: Ming Fu

6 July 2013 Round 16	Tianjin Teda	1–1	Shanghai Shenhua	Tianjin Olympic Center Stadium
16:00	Valencia 23'; Liao Bochao (yellow card) 32'	Summary	Zheng Kaimu (yellow card) 27'; Li Jianbin (yellow card) 49'; Schiavi (yellow card) 77'; Dady 83'	Attendance: 15,666; Referee: Muhd Taqi

13 July 2013 Round 17	Shanghai Shenhua	2–0	Shanghai Shenxin	Hongkou Football Stadium
19:45	Moreno 11'; Song Boxuan 40'; Zheng Kaimu (yellow card) 63'; Li Jianbin (yellow card) 89'; Wang Dalei (yellow card) 90'	Summary	Yu Tao (yellow card) 30'; Kieza (yellow card) 42'; Antônio Flávio (yellow card) 90'	Attendance: 12,235; Referee: Brenton Hayward

31 July 2013 Round 18	Liaoning Whowin	1–1	Shanghai Shenhua	Tiexi New District Sports Center
19:35	Zhao Junzhe (yellow card) 68'; Zhang Jingyang (red card) 76'; Yang Shanping (yellow card) 82'; Edu 90+7'	Summary	Al-Khatib 70'; Wang Dalei (yellow card) 90+4'	Attendance: 23,815; Referee: Hai Tan

5 August 2013 Round 19	Shanghai Shenhua	0–1	Hangzhou Greentown	Hongkou Football Stadium
19:45	Dai Lin (yellow card) 46'; Schiavi (yellow card) 47'; Bai Jiajun (yellow card) 86'	Summary	Shi Ke (yellow card) 76'; Žinko (yellow card) 82'; Kim Dong-Jin 85'	Attendance: 11,326; Referee: Shi Zhenlu

10 August 2013 Round 20	Shandong Luneng	3–2	Shanghai Shenhua	Jinan Olympic Sports Center Stadium
19:35	Wang Tong (yellow card) 31'; McGowan (yellow card) 48'; Vágner Love 56', 70'; Antar (yellow card) 67'; Yang Xu 89'	Summary	Dady 2', 34'; Wang Changqing (yellow card) 16'; Li Jianbin (yellow card) 42'; Xiong Fei (yellow card) 53'; Zheng Kaimu (yellow card) 73'	Attendance: 37,861; Referee: Tomohiro Inoue

17 August 2013 Round 21	Shanghai Shenhua	1–0	Qingdao Jonoon	Hongkou Football Stadium
19:45	Bai Jiajun (yellow card) 53'; Zhan Yilin (yellow card) 56'; Moreno 68' (yellow card) 68'	Summary	Caballero (yellow card) 16'	Attendance: 11,123; Referee: Fan Qi

24 August 2013 Round 22	Shanghai SIPG	0–1	Shanghai Shenhua	Shanghai Stadium
19:45	McBreen (yellow card) 56'; Ibini-Isei (yellow card) 81'	Summary	Moreno 53'; Schiavi (yellow card) 80'; Dady (yellow card) 90'	Attendance: 23,887; Referee: Ma Ning

31 August 2013 Round 23	Shanghai Shenhua	2–1	Wuhan Zall	Hongkou Football Stadium
19:45	Wang Changqing (yellow card) 28'; Moreno 41' (pen.); Li Jianbin (yellow card) 83'; Al-Khatib 90+9' (pen.)	Summary	Dembélé 16' (pen.) (yellow card) 61'; Zhou Heng (yellow card) 24'; Mei Fang (yellow card) 41'; Zhu Ting (yellow card) 41' (red card) 90+6'; Faty (yellow card) 90+5'	Attendance: 10,563; Referee: Chaiya Alee Mahapab

13 September 2013 Round 24	Guangzhou Evergrande	2–1	Shanghai Shenhua	Tianhe Stadium
20:00	Gao Lin (yellow card) 30' (goal) 50'; Elkeson 81'	Summary	Schiavi (yellow card) 5'; Wang Changqing (yellow card) 10' (yellow-red card) 71'; Wang Dalei (yellow card) 23'; Dai Lin (yellow card) 52'; Moreno 54' (pen.); Cao Yunding (yellow card) 77'; Bai Jiajun (yellow card) 90+2'	Attendance: 41,540; Referee: Kun Ai

21 September 2013 Round 25	Shanghai Shenhua	2–1	Jiangsu Sainty	Hongkou Football Stadium
19:45	Dady 48'; Xu Liang 72' (yellow card) 77'; Wang Shouting (yellow card) 88'	Summary	Wu Xi (yellow card) 43'; Ji Xiang 32'; Li Chi (yellow card) 71'	Attendance: 10,753; Referee: Kristian Griffiths-Jones

28 September 2013 Round 26	Beijing Guoan	2–0	Shanghai Shenhua	Workers' Stadium
19:35	Shao Jiayi (yellow card) 9'; Utaka 45', 56'	Summary	Moreno (yellow card) 34'	Attendance: 46,208; Referee: Yuki Noda

6 October 2013 Round 27	Shanghai Shenhua	2–1	Guizhou Renhe	Hongkou Football Stadium
19:45	Wang Shouting (yellow card) 60'; Al-Khatib 75' (pen.), 83' (pen.)	Summary	Schiavi 36' (o.g.); Salley (yellow card) 73'; Sun Jihai (yellow card) 85'; Muslimović (yellow card) 90+2'	Attendance: 9,673; Referee: Wang Jin

19 October 2013 Round 28	Dalian Aerbin	1–0	Shanghai Shenhua	Jinzhou Stadium
15:35	Zhao Hejing 51'	Summary	Moreno (yellow card) 39'; Dai Lin (yellow card) 79'	Attendance: 5,120; Referee: Hai Tan

30 October 2013 Round 29	Shanghai Shenhua	2–1	Changchun Yatai	Hongkou Football Stadium
19:35	Schiavi (yellow card) 31'; Wang Dalei (yellow card) 74'; Moreno 60', 88' (yellow card) 89'	Summary	Isac (yellow card) 10'; Rezek 26'; Wang Wanpeng (yellow card) 33'; Song Zhenyu (yellow card) 42'; Ismailov (yellow card) 47'; Eninho (red card) 83'	Attendance: 8,653; Referee: Hiroyuki Kimura

3 November 2013 Round 30	Guangzhou R&F	4–2	Shanghai Shenhua	Yuexiushan Stadium
15:35	Li Yan (yellow card) 20'; Yakubu 27' (pen.); Lu Lin (yellow card) 65' (yellow-red card) 71'; Rafael Coelho 68'; Davi 84' (pen.); Zhang Shuo 89'	Summary	Wang Shouting (yellow card) 3'; Wang Fei (yellow card) 23'; Al-Khatib 63'; Dai Lin (yellow card) 70'; Xiong Fei 77' (yellow card) 78'	Attendance: 10,023; Referee: Ai Kun

==== Table ====
Pos	Team	Pld	W	D	L	GF	GA	GD	Pts
6	Guangzhou R&F	30	11	7	12	45	47	−2	40 (Note: Guangzhou R&F 2–0 Shanghai Shenxin, Shanghai Shenxin 1–0 Guangzhou R&F)
7	Shanghai Shenxin	30	11	7	12	31	42	−11	40
8	Shanghai Shenhua	30	11	11	8	36	36	0	38 (Note: Shanghai Shenhua and Tianjin TEDA were deducted 6 points each because of match-fixing scandal in 2003.)
9	Shanghai Dongya	30	10	7	13	38	35	+3	37
10	Liaoning Whowin	30	8	11	11	35	44	−9	35

Source: Chinese Super League (in Chinese)
Rules for classification: 1st points; 2nd head-to-head points; 3rd head-to-head goal difference; 4th head-to-head goals scored; 5th goal difference; 6th goals scored; 7th disciplinary points (1 point for each yellow card, 3 points for each red card). Head-to-Head: used when head-to-head record is used to rank tied teams.

=== Chinese FA Cup ===
22 May 2013 Third round	Shanghai Shenhua	2–3	Dali Ruilong	Hongkou Football Stadium
19:45	Changqing 34'; Yunding 89'	Summary	Peng 13'; Z.Wang Yang 72'; Marseille 76'	Attendance: 3,123; Referee: Zhang Yue

== Squad statistics ==
=== Appearances and goals ===
No.	Pos	Nat	Player	Total		Super League		FA Cup	
No.	Pos	Nat	Player	Apps	Goals	Apps	Goals	Apps	Goals
1	GK	(China) CHN	Wang Dalei	28	0	28	0	0	0
2	DF	(Argentina) ARG	Rolando Schiavi	26	0	24+2	0	0	0
4	DF	(China) CHN	Li Jianbin	26	0	26	0	0	0
5	DF	(China) CHN	Dai Lin	29	0	29	0	0	0
7	MF	(China) CHN	Wang Changqing	26	0	19+7	0	0	0
8	MF	(China) CHN	Song Boxuan	25	1	21+4	1	0	0
9	FW	(Cape Verde) CPV	Dady	27	9	14+13	9	0	0
10	MF	(Colombia) COL	Giovanni Moreno	21	10	21	10	0	0
11	FW	(Syria) SYR	Firas Al-Khatib	29	11	28+1	11	0	0
12	DF	(China) CHN	Bai Jiajun	23	0	23	0	0	0
15	FW	(China) CHN	Zhan Yilin	16	0	10+6	0	0	0
16	MF	(China) CHN	Wang Fei	2	0	1+1	0	0	0
17	DF	(China) CHN	Xiong Fei	6	1	3+3	1	0	0
19	DF	(China) CHN	Zheng Kaimu	15	0	8+7	0	0	0
20	MF	(China) CHN	Xu Liang	15	3	14+1	3	0	0
21	MF	(China) CHN	Jiang Kun	21	0	8+13	0	0	0
22	GK	(China) CHN	Qiu Shengjiong	2	0	2	0	0	0
23	DF	(China) CHN	Liu Jiashen	1	0	0+1	0	0	0
27	MF	(Argentina) ARG	Patricio Toranzo	25	1	17+8	1	0	0
28	MF	(China) CHN	Cao Yunding	23	0	10+13	0	0	0
32	MF	(China) CHN	Liang Yu	2	0	0+2	0	0	0
33	MF	(China) CHN	Yan Song	2	0	0+2	0	0	0
36	MF	(China) CHN	Wang Shouting	24	0	24	0	0	0

=== Top scorers ===
Place	Position	Nation	Number	Name	Super League	FA Cup	Total
1	FW	(Syria)	11	Firas Al-Khatib	11	0	11
2	MF	(Colombia)	10	Giovanni Moreno	10	0	10
3	FW	(Cape Verde)	9	Dady	9	0	9
4	MF	(China)	20	Xu Liang	3	0	3
5	MF	(Argentina)	27	Patricio Toranzo	1	0	1
5	MF	(China)	8	Song Boxuan	1	0	1
5	DF	(China)	17	Xiong Fei	1	0	1
5	MF	(China)	7	Wang Changqing	0	1	1
5	MF	(China)	28	Cao Yunding	0	1	1
				TOTALS	36	2	38
