= 2012 Shanghai Shenhua F.C. season =

Shanghai Shenhua 2012
- Chairman: Zhu Jun
- Manager: Jean Tigana (until 15 April); Florent Ibengé (Interim) (26 April – 29 May); Sergio Batista (from 30 May)
- Super League: 9th
- FA Cup: Fourth round
- Top goalscorer: League: Didier Drogba (8); All: Didier Drogba (8)
- Highest home attendance: 24,635 vs Beijing Guoan; 14 July 2012
- Lowest home attendance: 9,326 vs Guizhou Renhe; 27 May 2012
- Average home league attendance: 15,227
Home colours	Away colours

The 2012 Shanghai Shenhua season was Shanghai Shenhua's 9th season in the Chinese Super League and 50th overall in the Chinese top flight. They also competed in the Chinese FA Cup that year, getting knocked out of that competition.

== Players ==
=== First team squad ===
As of 28 October 2012

Note: Flags indicate national team as defined under FIFA eligibility rules; some limited exceptions apply. Players may hold more than one non-FIFA nationality.

No.	Pos.	Nation	Player
1	GK	CHN	Wang Dalei
2	DF	CHN	Xiong Fei
3	DF	BRA	Moisés
4	DF	CHN	Wang Lin
5	DF	CHN	Dai Lin
6	MF	CHN	Yu Tao (captain)
7	MF	CHN	Feng Renliang
8	MF	CHN	Song Boxuan
10	MF	CHN	Jiang Kun
11	FW	CIV	Didier Drogba
12	DF	CHN	Bo Jiajun (on loan from Shanghai Tellace)
13	DF	CHN	Cheng Liang
14	MF	CHN	Fei Yu
15	MF	CHN	Wang Fei
16	MF	CHN	Fan Lingjiang
19	DF	CHN	Zheng Kaimu
20	DF	CHN	Wu Xi

No.	Pos.	Nation	Player
21	MF	CHN	Wang Guanyi
22	GK	CHN	Qiu Shengjiong
23	DF	CHN	Qiu Tianyi
24	MF	CHN	Wang Yang
26	DF	CHN	Zhang Jiawei
27	MF	CHN	Liu Junnan
28	MF	CHN	Cao Yunding
29	FW	AUS	Joel Griffiths
30	DF	CHN	Tao Jin
31	FW	CHN	You Yuanwen
32	MF	CHN	Gu Bin
33	MF	CHN	Yan Song
35	GK	CHN	Dong Guangxiang
36	MF	CHN	Wang Shouting
37	MF	COL	Giovanni Moreno
38	MF	CHN	Wang Hongliang
39	FW	FRA	Nicolas Anelka

=== Reserve squad ===
Note: Flags indicate national team as defined under FIFA eligibility rules; some limited exceptions apply. Players may hold more than one non-FIFA nationality.

No.	Pos.	Nation	Player
18	MF	MAS	Tam Sheang Tsung
41	MF	CHN	Bai Xuefeng
42	DF	CHN	Liu Jiashen
43	MF	CHN	Su Shun
44	MF	CHN	Liang Yu
45	DF	CHN	Yuan Shaohua
46	FW	CHN	Xu Qi

No.	Pos.	Nation	Player
47	MF	CHN	Pan Jiyuan
48	MF	CHN	Cheng Zecheng
50	MF	CHN	Li Hao
51	MF	CHN	Gu Xiaodong
52	MF	IDN	Dito Aulyandi
53	GK	CHN	Zhou Ye
54	DF	CHN	Jin Chenchen

== Transfers ==
=== Winter ===
In:

No.	Pos.	Nation	Player
3	DF	BRA	Moisés (from Al Rayyan)
9	FW	FRA	Mathieu Manset (loan from Reading)
16	MF	CHN	Wang Fei (free agent)
19	DF	CHN	Zheng Kaimu (from Chongqing F.C.)
24	MF	CHN	Wang Yang (loan return from FK Sūduva)
25	MF	BIH	Mario Božić (from FK Borac Čačak)
29	FW	AUS	Joel Griffiths (from Beijing Guoan)
32	MF	CHN	Gu Bin (loan return from FK Sūduva)
39	FW	FRA	Nicolas Anelka (from Chelsea)
-	FW	CHN	Dong Xuesheng (loan return from Shenzhen)
-	GK	CHN	Zhang Chen (loan return from Shenyang Dongjin)

Out:

No.	Pos.	Nation	Player
1	GK	CHN	Dong Lei (to Beijing Baxy)
3	DF	CHN	Xin Feng (to Wuhan Zall)
9	FW	ARG	Luis Salmerón (loan return to Talleres de Córdoba)
14	DF	COL	Juan Camilo Angulo (released)
16	FW	CHN	Wen Huyi (to Shenyang Shenbei)
18	DF	CHN	Jiang Jiajun (to Jiangsu Sainty)
19	FW	CHN	Dong Xuesheng (to Dalian Aerbin)
21	MF	ARG	Facundo Pérez Castro (released)
38	FW	COL	Eisner Iván Loboa (loan return to Deportivo Pasto)
-	GK	CHN	Zhang Chen (to Chengdu Blades)

=== Summer ===
In

No.	Pos.	Nation	Player
11	FW	CIV	Didier Drogba (from Chelsea)
12	DF	CHN	Bo Jiajun (loan from Shanghai Tellace)
18	MF	MAS	Tam Sheang Tsung (free agent)
33	MF	CHN	Yan Song (from Dalian Shide)
36	MF	CHN	Wang Shouting (from Liaoning Whowin)
37	MF	COL	Giovanni Moreno (from Racing)
38	MF	CHN	Wang Hongliang (from Chongqing Lifan)

Out:

No.	Pos.	Nation	Player
9	FW	FRA	Mathieu Manset (loan return to Reading)
25	MF	BIH	Mario Božić (to Simurq PFC)

== Competitions ==
=== Preseason and friendlies ===
14 January 2012 Winter tour	Shanghai Shenhua	2 – 2	Changchun Yatai	Kunming
16:00	Dai Lin 30'; Fan Lingjiang 60'	report(Chinese)	Claudinei 40' (pen.); Jiang Pengxiang 70'	Stadium: Hongta Football Base

18 January 2012 Winter tour	Shanghai Shenhua	2 – 2	Liaoning Whowin	Kunming
14:30	Cao Yunding 11'; Dai Lin 67'	report(Chinese)	Yu Hanchao 23'; Damjanović 59'	Stadium: Hongta Football Base

3 February 2012 Overseas tour	Shanghai Shenhua	0 – 3	Slovan Bratislava	Valencia, Spain
16:00 (CET)		report(Slovene)	Adrián Čermák 35'; Ondřej Smetana 40'; Karol Mészáros 79'	Stadium: Parador Stadium

9 February 2012 Overseas tour	Villarreal	6 – 0	Shanghai Shenhua	Valencia, Spain
11:00 (CET)	Joan Oriol 3' 25'; Wakaso Mubarak 11'; Marco Ruben 56'; Cani 86' 88'	report(Spanish)		Stadium: Mini Estadi

13 February 2012 Overseas tour	Huracán	2 – 0	Shanghai Shenhua	Valencia, Spain
16:00 (CET)	Willian 11'; Sergio Cuesta 87'	report(Spanish)		Stadium: Las Instalaciones de Crack's

21 February 2012 Preseason friendly	Shanghai Shenhua	3 – 1	Hunan Billows	Shanghai
14:30 (UTC-8)	Nicolas Anelka 1'; Cao Yunding 2'; Zheng Kaimu 77'		Wang Lichun 70'	Stadium: Shenhua Kangqiao Training Base

3 March 2012 Charity match	Shanghai Shenhua	0 – 0	Shanghai Tellace	Shanghai
14:30 (UTC-8)		report(Chinese)		Stadium: Hongkou Stadium

25 July 2012 Chevrolet Cup	Shanghai Shenhua	0 - 1	Manchester United	Shanghai
			Kagawa 69'	Stadium: Shanghai Stadium

=== Chinese Super League ===
==== Results summary ====
Overall								Home						Away					
Pld	W	D	L	GF	GA	GD	Pts	W	D	L	GF	GA	GD	W	D	L	GF	GA	GD
30	8	14	8	39	34	+5	38	7	5	3	23	12	+11	1	9	5	16	22	−6

Last updated: 5 November 2012.
Source: [ World-Football.net]

==== Results by round ====
Round	1	2	3	4	5	6	7	8	9	10	11	12	13	14	15	16	17	18	19	20	21	22	23	24	25	26	27	28	29	30
Ground	H	A	H	H	A	H	A	H	A	H	A	H	A	H	A	A	H	A	A	H	A	H	A	H	A	H	A	H	A	H
Result	D	L	W	L	D	L	W	D	D	D	L	W	L	D	L	D	W	D	D	W	D	D	D	W	D	W	L	L	D	W
Position	8	8	8	11	11	14	7	10	9	12	14	10	12	12	12	13	12	12	12	9	9	10	10	9	9	8	9	9	11	9

Updated to match(es) played on 5 November 2012. Source: "Soccerway". Archived from the original on February 9, 2013.
A = Away; H = Home; W = Win; D = Draw; L = Loss

==== Results ====
10 March 2012 Round 1	Shanghai Shenhua	1 – 1	Jiangsu Sainty	Hongkou Football Stadium
19:35	Griffiths 57'	Summary	Jevtić 11'	Attendance: 17,227; Referee: Cui Dayou

16 March 2012 Round 2	Beijing Guoan	3 – 2	Shanghai Shenhua	Workers Stadium
19:30	Piao Cheng 44'; Manú 53'; Mao Jianqing 82'	Summary	Griffiths 62' (pen.); Anelka 66'; Jiang Kun (red card) 90'	Attendance: 51,795; Referee: Guo Baolong

24 March 2012 Round 3	Shanghai Shenhua	1 – 0	Guangzhou R&F	Hongkou Football Stadium
	Cao Yunding 84'	Report		Attendance: 16,653

30 March 2012 Round 4	Shanghai Shenhua	0 – 1	Guangzhou Evergrande	Hongkou Football Stadium
	Song Boxuan (yellow card) 58' (yellow-red card) 79'	Report	Feng Junyan 31'; Sun Xiang (yellow card) 24' (yellow-red card) 89'	Attendance: 21,356; Referee: Sun Baojie

7 April 2012 Round 5	Hangzhou Greentown	1 – 1	Shanghai Shenhua	Yellow Dragon Sports Center
	Renatinho 12'	Summary	Anelka 10'

13 April 2012 Round 6	Shanghai Shenhua	0 – 1	Tianjin Teda	Hongkou Football Stadium
		Report	Ars 39'	Attendance: 11,215

21 April 2012 Round 7	Dalian Shide	0 – 1	Shanghai Shenhua	Jinzhou Stadium
		Summary	Renliang 80'

28 April 2012 Round 8	Shanghai Shenhua	0 – 0	Shandong Luneng Taishan	Hongkou Football Stadium
		Report		Attendance: 11,348

6 May 2012 Round 9	Liaoning Whowin	1 – 1	Shanghai Shenhua	Tiexi New District Sports Center
	Yang Xu 90+1'	Report	Tianyi 68'

12 May 2012 Round 10	Shanghai Shenhua	0 – 0	Shanghai Shenxin	Hongkou Football Stadium
		Report	Li Lei (yellow card) 53' (yellow-red card) 72'	Attendance: 11,732; Referee: Yoshiro Imamura

19 May 2012 Round 11	Henan Construction	1 – 0	Shanghai Shenhua	Hanghai Stadium
	Katongo 56'	Report

27 May 2012 Round 12	Shanghai Shenhua	2 – 1	Guizhou Renhe	Hongkou Football Stadium
	Manset 39'; Cao Yunding 67'	Report	Qu Bo 49'	Attendance: 9,326

16 June 2012 Round 13	Changchun Yatai	2 – 0	Shanghai Shenhua	Development Area Stadium
	Cássio 9'; Wenzhao 83'	Summary

24 June 2012 Round 14	Shanghai Shenhua	2 – 2	Dalian Aerbin	Hongkou Football Stadium
	Renliang 13', 69'	Summary	Zhou Tong 73'; Utaka 89'	Attendance: 10,323

1 July 2012 Round 15	Qingdao Jonoon	1 – 0	Shanghai Shenhua	Qingdao Tiantai Stadium
	Jianrong 40'	Report

8 July 2012 Round 16	Jiangsu Sainty	2 – 2	Shanghai Shenhua	Nanjing Olympic Sports Center
	Dănălache 44' (pen.), 59' (pen.)	Report	Dai Lin 48'; Moisés 75'

14 July 2012 Round 17	Shanghai Shenhua	3 – 1	Beijing Guoan	Hongkou Football Stadium
	Song Boxuan 20'; Cao Yunding 52'; Moisés 75'	Report	Wang Xiaolong 82' (pen.)

22 July 2012 Round 18	Guangzhou R&F	1 – 1	Shanghai Shenhua	Yuexiushan Stadium
	Moisés 22' (o.g.)	Report	Cao Yunding 68'

28 July 2012 Round 19	Guangzhou Evergrande	2 – 2	Shanghai Shenhua	Tianhe Stadium
	Conca 41'; Muriqui 79'	Report	Song Boxuan 57'; Moreno 81'

4 August 2012 Round 20	Shanghai Shenhua	5 – 1	Hangzhou Greentown	Hongkou Football Stadium
19:45	Drogba 9', 84'; Renliang 33'; Moreno 87'; Griffiths 90+2'	Report	Feng Gang 7'; Renatinho (yellow card) 41' (yellow-red card) 74'

11 August 2012 Round 21	Tianjin Teda	0 – 0	Shanghai Shenhua	TEDA Football Stadium
19:30		Report

18 August 2012 Round 22	Shanghai Shenhua	0 – 0	Dalian Shide	Hongkou Football Stadium
19:45		Report

25 August 2012 Round 23	Shandong Luneng Taishan	3 – 3	Shanghai Shenhua	Shandong Provincial Stadium
19:30	Wang Yongpo 54' (pen.); Macena 66'; Ortigoza 79'	Report	Drogba 2', 75'; Dai Lin (yellow card) 58' (yellow-red card) 60'; Anelka 87'

15 September 2012 Round 24	Shanghai Shenhua	3 – 0	Liaoning Whowin	Hongkou Football Stadium
20:00	Zheng Kaimu 39'; Jiajun 85'; Drogba 90'	Report

22 September 2012 Round 25	Shanghai Shenxin	1 – 1	Shanghai Shenhua	Jinshan Sports Centre
19:45	Wang Yun 62'	Report	Drogba 17'

29 September 2012 Round 26	Shanghai Shenhua	2 – 1	Henan Construction	Hongkou Football Stadium
20:00	Wu Xi 13'; Cao Yunding 71'	Report	Zhang Li 55'

6 October 2012 Round 27	Guizhou Renhe	4 – 2	Shanghai Shenhua	Guiyang Olympic Sports Center
15:30	Jordà 16'; Djulbic 38'; Zhang Chenglin 57'; Shen Tianfeng 78'	Report	Griffiths 63'; Drogba 89'

20 October 2012 Round 28	Shanghai Shenhua	1 – 3	Changchun Yatai	Hongkou Football Stadium
20:00	Griffiths 45'	Report	Liu Weidong 8', 11'; Marquinhos 45+2' (pen.)

27 October 2012 Round 29	Dalian Aerbin	0 – 0	Shanghai Shenhua	Jinzhou Stadium
12:30		Report

3 November 2012 Round 30	Shanghai Shenhua	3 – 0	Qingdao Jonoon	Hongkou Football Stadium
12:30	Drogba 74'; Song Boxuan 81'; Griffiths 83'	Summary

==== Table ====
Pos	Team	Pld	W	D	L	GF	GA	GD	Pts
7	Guangzhou R&F	30	13	3	14	47	49	−2	42
8	Tianjin TEDA	30	10	10	10	29	30	−1	40
9	Shanghai Shenhua	30	8	14	8	39	34	+5	38
10	Liaoning Whowin	30	8	12	10	40	41	−1	36 (Note: Liaoning, 10pts; Hangzhou, 9pts; Shandong, 6pts, GF=4, GA=5; Qingdao, 6pts, GF=4, GA=5)
11	Hangzhou Greentown	30	9	9	12	34	46	−12	36

Source: Chinese Super League (in Chinese)
Rules for classification: 1) points; 2) goal difference; 3) number of goals scored; 4) head-to-head goals scored; 5) goal difference; 6) goals scored; 7) disciplinary points (1 point for each yellow card, 3 points for each red card). Head-to-Head: Only used at the end of the season when two or more teams need the head-to-head rules to break a tie.

=== Chinese FA Cup ===
27 June 2012 Third round	Shanghai Shenhua	0 – 0 (5 – 4 p)	Shenzhen Ruby	Hongkou Football Stadium
19:45
	Penalties
	Božić (penalty scored); Dai Lin (penalty scored); Wu Xi (penalty scored); Wang Guanyi (penalty missed); Yu Tao (penalty scored); Cao Yunding (penalty scored)		(penalty scored) Gavanon; (penalty missed) Rakuyama; (penalty scored) Zhang Shichang; (penalty scored) Yu Le; (penalty scored) Gueye; (penalty missed) Ding Haifeng

18 July 2012 Fourth round	Changchun Yatai	0 – 0 (5 – 3 p)	Shanghai Shenhua	Development Area Stadium
19:30
	Penalties
	Wang Dong (penalty scored); Marquinhos (penalty scored); Perea (penalty scored); Cao Tianbao (penalty scored); Qu Xiaohui (penalty scored)		(penalty scored) Moreno; (penalty scored) Feng Renliang; (penalty scored) Yan Song; (penalty missed) Yu Tao

== Squad statistics ==
=== Appearances and goals ===
No.	Pos	Nat	Player	Total		Super League		FA Cup	
No.	Pos	Nat	Player	Apps	Goals	Apps	Goals	Apps	Goals
1	GK	(China) CHN	Wang Dalei	30	0	28+0	0	2+0	0
2	DF	(China) CHN	Xiong Fei	1	0	1+0	0	0+0	0
3	DF	(Brazil) BRA	Moisés	17	2	16+0	2	1+0	0
4	DF	(China) CHN	Wang Lin	16	0	8+7	0	1+0	0
5	DF	(China) CHN	Dai Lin	25	1	23+0	1	2+0	0
6	MF	(China) CHN	Yu Tao	28	0	26+0	0	2+0	0
7	MF	(China) CHN	Feng Renliang	25	4	19+4	4	2+0	0
8	MF	(China) CHN	Song Boxuan	19	2	15+3	2	1+0	0
10	MF	(China) CHN	Jiang Kun	21	0	15+5	0	1+0	0
11	FW	(Ivory Coast) CIV	Didier Drogba	11	9	10+1	9	0+0	0
12	DF	(China) CHN	Bai Jiajun	12	1	11+0	1	1+0	0
15	MF	(China) CHN	Fei Yu	2	0	0+2	0	0+0	0
16	MF	(China) CHN	Wang Fei	7	0	3+3	0	1+0	0
17	MF	(China) CHN	Fan Lingjiang	4	0	3+1	0	0+0	0
19	DF	(China) CHN	Zheng Kaimu	15	1	13+2	1	0+0	0
20	DF	(China) CHN	Wu Xi	29	0	27+0	0	2+0	0
21	MF	(China) CHN	Wang Guanyi	9	0	8+0	0	1+0	0
23	DF	(China) CHN	Qiu Tianyi	15	1	13+1	1	1+0	0
24	MF	(China) CHN	Wang Yang	2	0	0+2	0	0+0	0
27	MF	(China) CHN	Liu Junnan	5	0	0+5	0	0+0	0
28	MF	(China) CHN	Cao Yunding	25	4	9+14	4	2+0	0
29	FW	(Australia) AUS	Joel Griffiths	16	5	13+3	5	0+0	0
32	MF	(China) CHN	Gu Bin	4	0	2+2	0	0+0	0
33	MF	(China) CHN	Yan Song	2	0	0+1	0	0+1	0
36	MF	(China) CHN	Wang Shouting	6	0	2+3	0	0+1	0
37	MF	(Colombia) COL	Giovanni Moreno	14	2	12+0	2	2+0	0
39	FW	(France) FRA	Nicolas Anelka	23	3	21+0	3	2+0	0
46	FW	(China) CHN	Xu Qi	2	0	0+1	0	0+1	0
Players who appeared for Shanghai Shenhua no longer at the club:
9	FW	(France) FRA	Mathieu Manset	9	1	6+3	1	0+0	0
25	MF	(Bosnia and Herzegovina) BIH	Mario Božić	14	0	10+3	0	1+0	0

=== Top scorers ===
Place	Position	Nation	Number	Name	Super League	FA Cup	Total
1	FW	(Ivory Coast)	11	Didier Drogba	9	0	9
2	FW	(Australia)	29	Joel Griffiths	6	0	6
3	MF	(China)	28	Cao Yunding	5	0	5
4	MF	(China)	7	Feng Renliang	4	0	4
5	FW	(France)	39	Nicolas Anelka	3	0	3
5	MF	(China)	8	Song Boxuan	3	0	3
6	DF	(Brazil)	3	Moisés	2	0	2
6	MF	(Colombia)	37	Giovanni Moreno	2	0	2
7	DF	(China)	23	Qiu Tianyi	1	0	1
7	FW	(France)	9	Mathieu Manset	1	0	1
7	DF	(China)	5	Dai Lin	1	0	1
7	DF	(China)	19	Zheng Kaimu	1	0	1
7	DF	(China)	12	Bo Jiajun	1	0	1
				TOTALS	36	0	36

=== Disciplinary record ===
Number	Nation	Position	Name	Super League		FA Cup		Total	
Number	Nation	Position	Name	Yellow card	Red card	Yellow card	Red card	Yellow card	Red card
1	(China)	GK	Wang Dalei	3	0	0	0	3	0
3	(Brazil)	DF	Moisés	2	0	0	0	2	0
4	(China)	DF	Wang Lin	0	0	1	0	1	0
5	(China)	DF	Dai Lin	10	1	1	0	11	1
6	(China)	MF	Yu Tao	5	0	0	0	5	0
7	(China)	MF	Feng Renliang	1	0	0	0	1	0
8	(China)	MF	Song Boxuan	4	1	0	0	4	1
10	(China)	MF	Jiang Kun	2	1	0	0	2	1
11	(Ivory Coast)	MF	Didier Drogba	2	0	0	0	2	0
12	(China)	DF	Bai Jiajun	3	0	0	0	3	0
16	(China)	MF	Wang Fei	2	0	0	0	2	0
17	(China)	MF	Fan Lingjiang	1	0	0	0	1	0
19	(China)	DF	Zheng Kaimu	3	0	0	0	3	0
20	(China)	DF	Wu Xi	4	0	1	0	5	0
21	(China)	MF	Wang Guanyi	1	0	0	0	1	0
23	(China)	DF	Qiu Tianyi	2	0	0	0	2	0
25	(Bosnia and Herzegovina)	MF	Mario Božić	6	0	0	0	6	0
28	(China)	MF	Cao Yunding	2	0	0	0	2	0
29	(Australia)	FW	Joel Griffiths	2	0	0	0	2	0
36	(China)	MF	Wang Shouting	2	0	0	0	2	0
37	(Colombia)	MF	Giovanni Moreno	2	0	0	0	2	0
39	(France)	FW	Nicolas Anelka	4	0	0	0	4	0
46	(China)	FW	Xu Qi	1	0	0	0	1	0
			TOTALS	62	3	3	0	65	3

=== Overall ===
Games played	31 (29 Chinese Super League, 2 Chinese FA Cup)
Games won	7 (7 Chinese Super League)
Games drawn	16 (14 Chinese Super League, 2 Chinese FA Cup)
Games lost	8 (8 Chinese Super League)
Goals scored	35 (35 Chinese Super League)
Goals conceded	34 (34 Chinese Super League)
Goal difference	+1 (+1 Chinese Super League, 0 Chinese FA Cup)
Clean sheets	10 (8 Chinese Super League, 2 Chinese FA Cup)
Yellow cards	65 (62 Chinese Super League, 3 Chinese FA Cup)
Red cards	3 (3 Chinese Super League)
Worst discipline	Dai Lin (11 (yellow card) , 1 (red card) )
Best result	W 5 – 1 (H) v Hangzhou Greentown – Chinese Super League – 4 August 2012
Worst result	L 0 – 2 (A) v Changchun Yatai – Chinese Super League – 16 June 2012
Most appearances	Wang Dalei (30 appearances)
Top goalscorer	Didier Drogba (9 goals)

Last updated: 29 October
Source: Competitions
