= 2007 Guangzhou Pharmaceutical F.C. season =

Guangzhou FC
2007 season
- Chairman: Yang Rongming
- Manager: Shen Xiangfu
- Stadium: Yuexiushan Stadium
- Chinese Jia League: 1st
- Top goalscorer: Luis Ramírez (19)
Home colours	Away colours

The 2007 season is Guangzhou FC's ninth consecutive year in Chinese Jia League.Guangzhou Pharmaceutical finished the first of the league and promoted to China Super League.

== First-team squad ==
=== Players ===
Note: Flags indicate national team as defined under FIFA eligibility rules; some limited exceptions apply. Players may hold more than one non-FIFA nationality.

No.	Pos.	Nation	Player
1	GK	(China) CHN	Zhi Xinhua
2	DF	(China) CHN	Li Zhihai (Captain)
3	MF	(China) CHN	Li Yan
4	DF	(China) CHN	Zhou Lin
5	DF	(China) CHN	Dai Xianrong (Vice-captain)
6	MF	(China) CHN	Huang Zhiyi
7	MF	(China) CHN	Feng Junyan
8	FW	(China) CHN	Gao Ming
9	FW	(Honduras) HON	Luis Alfredo Ramírez
10	FW	(Paraguay) PAR	Casiano
11	FW	(China) CHN	Wen Xiaoming
12	FW	(China) CHN	Li Zhixing
13	FW	(China) CHN	Tang Dechao
14	MF	(China) CHN	Cao Zhijie
15	MF	(China) CHN	Ren Dazhong
16	MF	(China) CHN	Xu Deen
17	MF	(China) CHN	Luo Yong
18	FW	(China) CHN	Yang Pengfeng
19	DF	(China) CHN	Yang Xichang
20	MF	(China) CHN	Xu Liang
21	GK	(China) CHN	Zhang Yuntao

No.	Pos.	Nation	Player
22	GK	(China) CHN	Li Shuai
23	MF	(China) CHN	Lu Lin
24	DF	(China) CHN	He Wenyao
25	MF	(China) CHN	Li Songhao
26	DF	(Brazil) BRA	Clebão
27	FW	(China) CHN	Ma Longchao
28	DF	(China) CHN	Zhang Suozhi
29	MF	(China) CHN	Jia Wenpeng
30	MF	(China) CHN	Cao Yaohui
31	MF	(China) CHN	Chen Liming
32	GK	(China) CHN	Dong Shaonan
33	MF	(China) CHN	Zhu Zhenhua
34	MF	(China) CHN	Huang Jiafu
35	FW	(Brazil) BRA	Jefferson
37	DF	(China) CHN	Zhang Jian
38	DF	(China) CHN	Huang Baocheng
39	FW	(China) CHN	Chen Qian
40	DF	(China) CHN	Fan Zhirui
41	DF	(China) CHN	Wang Jin
42	FW	(China) CHN	Chen Fei

=== Technical staff ===
Position	Staff
Head coach	(China) Shen Xiangfu
Assistant coach	(China) Tang Pengju
Assistant coach	(China) Ren Jiaqing
Goalkeeping coach	(China) Li Lixin
Fitness coach	(China) Ye Zhibin

== Transfers ==
=== In ===
#	Pos	Player	From
1	GK	(China) Zhi Xinhua	Youth team
4	DF	(China) Zhou Lin	(China) Chongqing Lifan
9	FW	(Honduras) Luis Alfredo Ramírez	(China) Shanghai Shenhua
10	FW	(Paraguay) Casiano	Free agent
20	MF	(China) Xu Liang	(China) Liaoning Hongyun
22	GK	(China) Li Shuai	(China) Qingdao Jonoon
27	FW	(China) Ma Longchao	(China) Dongguan Nancheng
28	MF	(China) Cai Yaohui	(China) Dongguan Nancheng
29	MF	(China) Jia Wenpeng	(China) Chongqing Lifan
32	GK	(China) Dong Shaonan	Youth team
33	MF	(China) Zhu Zhenghua	Youth team
34	MF	(China) Huang Jiafu	Youth team
35	DF	(Brazil) Jefferson	(Brazil) Coritiba-PR
37	DF	(China) Zhang Jian	Youth team
38	DF	(China) Huang Baocheng	Youth team
42	FW	(China) Chen Fei	Youth team

=== Loan In ===
#	Pos	Player	From	Duration
8	FW	(China) Gao Ming	(China) Shandong Luneng	2007 Season
26	DF	(Brazil) Clebão	(Brazil) São Carlos	2007 Season

=== Out ===
#	Pos	Player	To
1	GK	(China) Wei Zhao	Hong Kong Rangers FC
8	FW	(China) Hu Jiajian	Released
10	FW	(China) Du Zhiqiang	Released
13	MF	(China) Guan Zhichao	(China) Nanchang Bayi
14	DF	(China) Liang Jingwen	(China) Guangxi Tianji
16	MF	(China) Zou You	(China) Dalian Shide(loan return)
18	GK	(China) Li Wei	Released
20	MF	(China) Guo Liang	(China) Dalian Shide(loan return)
22	GK	(China) Yu Bo	(China) Beijing Guoan(loan return)
26	FW	(China) Liu Xiaofeng	(China) Dalian Shide(loan return)
27	FW	(Romania) Claudiu Răducanu	(Cyprus) Nea Salamina
28	MF	(China) He Yihui	Released
30	MF	(China) Liu Yibing	(China) Shanghai Stars
31	DF	(Romania) Corneliu Papură	(Romania) FC Progresul București
32	MF	(Romania) Constantin Schumacher	(Romania) FC Argeş Piteşti
34	FW	(China) Li Haifeng	Released
38	DF	(China) Luo An'an	Released

== Match results ==
=== Pre-season and friendlies ===
Kick-off (GMT+8)	Opponents	H / A	Result	Scorers
2007-01-25	(China) Xiamen Lanshi	N	0–1	
2007-01-26	(China) Beijing Hongdeng	N	1–0	
2007-01-28	(China) Chongqing Lifan	N	2–1	
2007-01-30	(China) Chongqing Lifan	N	1–0	
2007-02-07	(South Korea) Chunnam Dragons	N	1–1	
2007-02-07	(South Korea) Ulsan Hyundai	N	1–0	
2007-02-08	(South Korea) Gwangju Sangmu Phoenix	N	4–2	
2007-02-	(North Korea) April 25	N	0–1	
2007-02-	(South Korea) Ulsan Hyundai	N	0–1	
2007-02-	(South Korea) Gwangju Sangmu Phoenix	N	2–1	
2007-02-15	(China) Shaanxi Chan-ba	H	2–0	
2007-02-23	(China) Shenzhen Xiangxue Eisiti	N	2–0	
2007-02-25	(China) Changchun Yatai	H	1–1	
2007-02-26	(China) Changchun Yatai	H	2–1	
2007-03-17	(China) Shenzhen Xiangxue Eisiti	A	0–0	
2007-03-23	China U-23	H	2–0	Lu Lin 47', Xu Liang 76'(p)
2007-07-27	(England) Manchester United	H	0–3	Wayne Rooney 18'(p), Nani 42', Lee Martin 51'
2007-08-07	(Hong Kong) South China AA	H	6–1	
2007-08-21	(Hong Kong) Kitchee SC	H	Not Finished (Rainstorm)	
2007-09-11	(China) Guangdong Sunray Cave	H	6–0	
2007-10-29	(Australia) Victoria AustTiger	H	1–0	Yang Pengfeng 24'

=== Chinese Jia League 2007 ===
Overall								Home						Away					
Pld	W	D	L	GF	GA	GD	Pts	W	D	L	GF	GA	GD	W	D	L	GF	GA	GD
24	19	4	1	65	15	+50	61	11	1	0	43	7	+36	8	3	1	22	8	+14

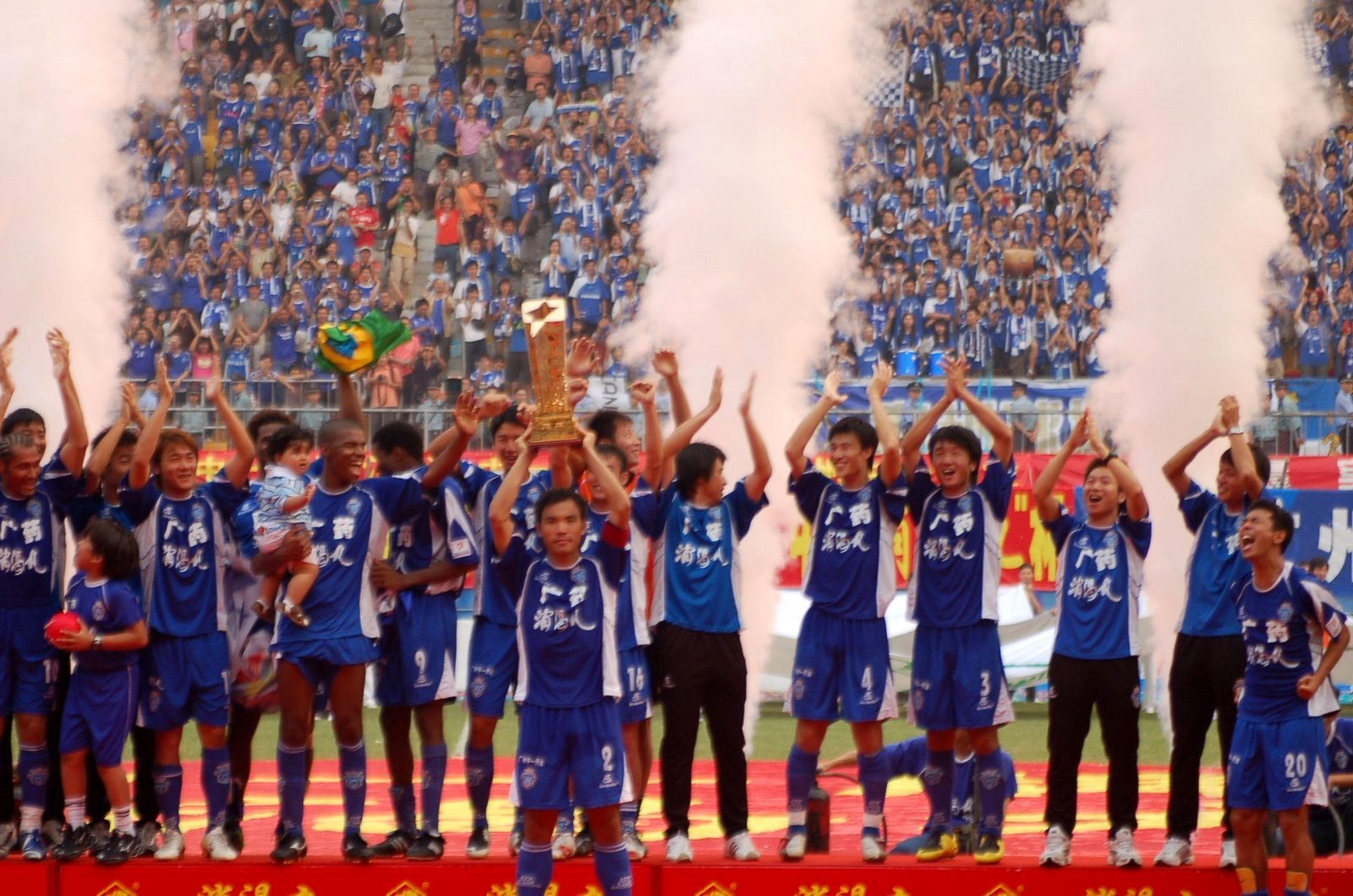

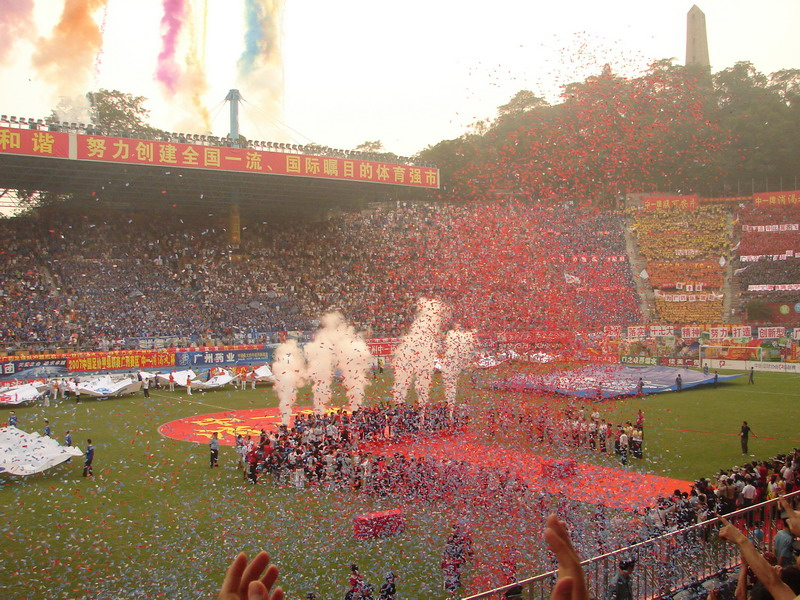

Match won	Match drawn	Match lost	Biggest win	Biggest loss

Kick-off (GMT+8)	Opponents	H / A	Result	Scorers (opponents are indicated in italics)	Referee	Attendance	Pos
2007-03-31 15:30	Nanchang Bayi	H	3 – 0	Xu Liang 12', Casiano 19', Casiano 61'		23,000	2nd
2007-04-07 15:00	Chongqing Lifan	A	3 – 1	Lu Lin 18', Luis Ramírez 26',Wang Kai 54'(p),Lu Lin 91'+			2nd
Bye							2nd
2007-04-21 15:30	Chengdu Blades	H	0 – 0				3rd
2007-04-28 15:00	Beijing Hongdeng	A	2 – 0	Jia Wenpeng 55', Xu Liang 63'			3rd
2007-05-05 15:30	Nanjing Yoyo	H	5 – 1	Cílio 9',Xu Liang 15'(p), Yang Pengfeng 19', Lu Lin 21', Yang Pengfeng 53', Luis Ramírez 66'			2nd
2007-05-12 15:00	Chongqing Lifan	A	1 – 0	Li Yan 60'			2nd
2007-05-19 15:30	Hohhot	H	7 – 0	Yang Pengfeng 1', Yang Pengfeng 16', Xu Deen 21', Luis Ramírez 48', Xu Liang 57', Li Zhixing 77', Feng Junyan 84'			1st
2007-05-26 15:00	Yanbian FC	A	2 – 0	Yang Pengfeng 38', Luo Yong 67'			1st
2007-06-02 16:00	Shanghai Stars	H	4 – 0	Lu Lin 38', Luis Ramírez 40', Luis Ramírez 68', Luis Ramírez 90'+			1st
2007-06-16 15:00	Beijing Institute of Technology FC	A	3 – 3	Yang Siyuan 35', Kim Joon-Sik 37',Xu Liang 40', Xu Liang 44', Luis Ramírez 75',Kang Sibei 91'+			1st
2007-06-23 16:00	Jiangsu Sainty	H	2 – 1	Yang Pengfeng 27',André 47'+(p),Luis Ramírez 58'	Sun Baojie		1st
2007-06-30 15:00	Harbin Yiteng	A	1 – 1	Jefferson 36',Zhang Jingyang 67'			1st
2007-08-04 19:30	Nanchang Bayi	A	0 – 0				2nd
2007-08-11 16:00	Chongqing Lifan	H	2 – 1	Luis Ramírez 44', Luis Ramírez 72',Zhang Li 86'	Tan Hai		1st
Bye							2nd
2007-08-25 19:30	Chengdu Blades	A	2 – 1	Luis Ramírez 8',Min Jin 61',Xu Liang 64'			1st
2007-09-01 15:30	Beijing Hongdeng	H	3 – 0	Xu Liang 33', Luis Ramírez 62', Yang Pengfeng 72'			1st
2007-09-08 19:30	Nanjing Yoyo	A	4 – 1	Luis Ramírez 3', Luis Ramírez 25', Luis Ramírez 28',Li Weiliang 53'(p),Xu Liang 61'			1st
2007-09-15 15:30	Qingdao Haixin	H	6 – 1	Xu Liang 4', Xu Liang 16', Xu Liang 37'(p), Huang Zhiyi 44', Jefferson 67',Zhao Wenqiang 82', Li Yan 90'			1st
2007-09-22	Hohhot	A	3–0^{1}				1st
2007-09-29 15:30	Yanbian FC	H	3 – 1	Yang Pengfeng 36',Kim Myong-Chol 61',Luis Ramírez 77', Yang Pengfeng 88'			1st
2007-10-06 15:35	Shanghai Stars	A	1 – 0	Gao Ming 70'			1st
2007-10-13 15:30	Beijing Institute of Technology FC	H	4 – 2	Yang Si 19',Luis Ramírez 27',Zhang Shu 43',Gao Ming 50', Jefferson 71', Xu Deen 91'+			1st
2007-10-20 14:00	Jiangsu Sainty	A	0 – 1	Li Chi 4'			1st
2007-10-27 14:00	Harbin Yiteng	H	4 – 0	Luis Ramírez 25'(p), Yang Pengfeng 48', Jefferson 50', Luis Ramírez 69'	Xu Hang	30,000	1st

- ^1 Hohhot have withdrawn from the league. All matches were counted as 0–3 defeats.
