= Liu Jiashen =

Chinese footballer

Liu Jiashen 刘佳燊
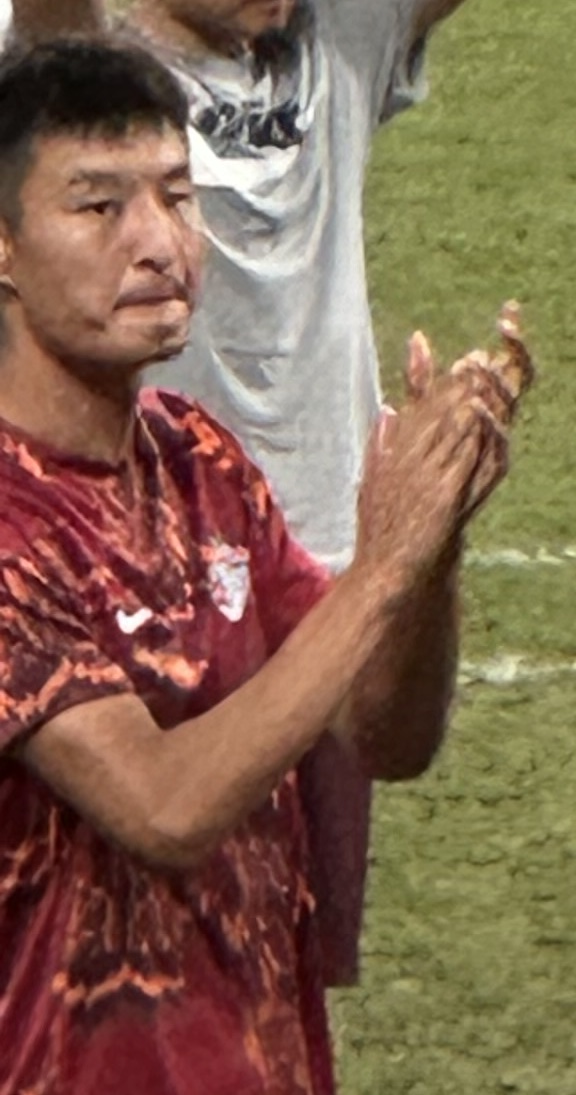
- Liu Jiashen in August 2024

Personal information
- Date of birth: November 23, 1991 (age 34)
- Place of birth: Qingdao, Shandong, China
- Height: 1.91 m (6 ft 3 in)
- Position: Defender

Team information
- Current team: Qingdao Hainiu
- Number: 33

Youth career
- 2010: Qingdao Hailifeng

Senior career*
| Years | Team | Apps | (Gls) |
| 2011–2014 | Shanghai Shenhua | 2 | (0) |
| 2015–2021 | Qingdao Huanghai | 64 | (3) |
| 2022 | Shaanxi Chang'an Athletic | 7 | (0) |
| 2022– | Qingdao Hainiu | 76 | (1) |
- * Club domestic league appearances and goals as of 22 November 2026

Liu Jiashen (simplified Chinese: 刘佳燊; traditional Chinese: 劉佳燊; pinyin: Liú Jiāshēn; born 23 November 1991 in Qingdao) is a Chinese football player who plays as a defender for Qingdao Hainiu.

== Club career ==
In 2011, Liu Jiashen started his professional footballer career with Shanghai Greenland Shenhua in the Chinese Super League. He would eventually make his league debut for Shenhua on 18 June 2011 in a game against Hangzhou Greentown, coming on as a substitute for Feng Renliang in the 86th minute as the match ended in a 1–0 defeat. His time at Shenhua would see him struggle to gain much more playing time and by the 2015 league season he would leave the club to return to his hometown and join second-tier football team Qingdao Huanghai. He would eventually make his debut for Qingdao on 13 April 2016 in a Chinese FA Cup game against Lijiang Jiayunhao that ended in a 2–1 defeat. While he would score in his league debut for the club on 28 October 2017 against Meizhou Hakka in a 2–1 defeat, Liu would still find himself as a peripheral figure within the team until the Head coach Jordi Vinyals decided to hand Liu his first league start on 6 April 2019 against Heilongjiang Lava Spring that ended in a 3–0 victory. After that game Liu would become an integral member of the team that would win the 2019 China League One division and promotion into the top tier.

At the end of the 2021 Chinese Super League campaign he would be part of the squad that was relegated. On 28 April 2022 he would join second tier football club Shaanxi Chang'an Athletic on a free transfer. After only a handful of games he would leave Shaanxi to transfer to another second tier club in Qingdao Hainiu F.C. on 1 August 2022. He would go on to establish himself as regular within the team that gained promotion to the top tier at the end of the 2022 China League One campaign.

== Career statistics ==
Statistics accurate as of match played 08 July 2024.

Appearances and goals by club, season and competition
| Club | Season | League | | | National Cup | | Continental | | Other | | Total | |
| Club | Season | Division | Apps | Goals | Apps | Goals | Apps | Goals | Apps | Goals | Apps | Goals |
|---|---|---|---|---|---|---|---|---|---|---|---|---|
| Shanghai Shenhua | 2011 | Chinese Super League | 1 | 0 | 0 | 0 | 0 | 0 | - | | 1 | 0 |
| Shanghai Shenhua | 2012 | Chinese Super League | 0 | 0 | 0 | 0 | - | | - | | 0 | 0 |
| Shanghai Shenhua | 2013 | Chinese Super League | 1 | 0 | 0 | 0 | - | | - | | 1 | 0 |
| Shanghai Shenhua | 2014 | Chinese Super League | 0 | 0 | 0 | 0 | - | | - | | 0 | 0 |
| Shanghai Shenhua | Total | | 2 | 0 | 0 | 0 | 0 | 0 | 0 | 0 | 2 | 0 |
| Qingdao Huanghai | 2016 | China League One | 0 | 0 | 1 | 0 | - | | - | | 1 | 0 |
| Qingdao Huanghai | 2017 | China League One | 1 | 1 | 0 | 0 | - | | - | | 1 | 1 |
| Qingdao Huanghai | 2018 | China League One | 4 | 0 | 0 | 0 | - | | - | | 4 | 0 |
| Qingdao Huanghai | 2019 | China League One | 26 | 1 | 0 | 0 | - | | - | | 26 | 1 |
| Qingdao Huanghai | 2020 | Chinese Super League | 17 | 0 | 0 | 0 | - | | - | | 17 | 0 |
| Qingdao Huanghai | 2021 | Chinese Super League | 16 | 1 | 0 | 0 | - | | 1 (Note: Appearance(s) in Promotion/Relegation play-offs) | 0 | 17 | 1 |
| Qingdao Huanghai | Total | | 64 | 3 | 1 | 0 | 0 | 0 | 1 | 0 | 66 | 3 |
| Shaanxi Chang'an Athletic | 2022 | China League One | 7 | 0 | 0 | 0 | - | | - | | 7 | 0 |
| Qingdao Hainiu | 2022 | China League One | 17 | 1 | 0 | 0 | - | | - | | 17 | 1 |
| Qingdao Hainiu | 2023 | Chinese Super League | 15 | 0 | 2 | 0 | - | | - | | 17 | 0 |
| Qingdao Hainiu | 2024 | Chinese Super League | 12 | 0 | 0 | 0 | - | | - | | 12 | 0 |
| Qingdao Hainiu | Total | | 44 | 1 | 2 | 0 | 0 | 0 | 0 | 0 | 46 | 1 |
| Career total | | | 117 | 4 | 3 | 0 | 0 | 0 | 1 | 0 | 121 | 4 |

== Honours ==
=== Club ===
Qingdao Huanghai

- China League One: 2019
