= Mathieu Manset =

French footballer (born 1989)

Personal information
- Full name: Mathieu Manset
- Date of birth: 5 August 1989 (age 37)
- Place of birth: Metz, France
- Height: 1.88 m (6 ft 2 in)
- Position: Forward

Youth career
- Le Havre

Senior career*
| Years | Team | Apps | (Gls) |
| 2007–2009 | Le Havre | 0 | (0) |
| 2009–2011 | Hereford United | 50 | (10) |
| 2011–2012 | Reading | 28 | (5) |
| 2012 | → Shanghai Shenhua (loan) | 9 | (1) |
| 2012–2013 | Sion | 5 | (1) |
| 2013 | Carlisle United | 7 | (0) |
| 2013–2014 | Coventry City | 9 | (1) |
| 2014 | Royal Antwerp | 11 | (3) |
| 2014–2015 | Walsall | 19 | (0) |
| 2015 | Cheltenham Town | 12 | (0) |
| 2015 | Slavia Sofia | 9 | (1) |
| 2016 | Consolat Marseille | 13 | (2) |
| 2017 | Hamrun Spartans | 11 | (2) |
| 2017–2018 | Bastia | 23 | (17) |
| 2018 | A.C. Vicenza 1902 | | |
| 2018 | Rotonda Calcio | 6 | (0) |
| 2019 | Fleury 91 | 4 | (0) |
| Total | | 216 | (43) |
- * Club domestic league appearances and goals

Mathieu Manset (French pronunciation: [matjø mɑ̃sɛ]; born 5 August 1989) is a French former professional footballer who played as a forward. He played for 18 clubs in 8 countries during his career.

== Career ==
Manset was born in Metz and started his career in his native France with Le Havre AC. In the 2007–08 season he managed to break into the reserve side, who played in the Championnat de France amateur, the fourth tier of French football. He went on to play eleven league matches and score one goal for the side during the campaign. In the following season, Manset played a further 12 games for Le Havre Réserve but failed get on the scoresheet. His last appearance for Le Havre came in the 2–1 win over Paris Saint-Germain Réserve at the Parc des Princes on 8 May 2009.

=== Hereford United ===
Manset was released by Le Havre in the summer of 2009 and was recommended to Football League Two side Hereford United by Guy Ipoua. After a successful trial, he joined Hereford on a free transfer. His debut in English football came in the second round of the Football League Trophy where he featured as a substitute in the last 20 minutes of the game at home to Aldershot Town and scored a late goal to put the Bulls into a 2–1 lead. However, Aldershot quickly equalised and sent the game to a penalty shoot out, which Hereford won 4–3. Manset scored what turned out to be the decisive penalty with a powerful strike into the top left corner of the goal.

In the first round of the FA Cup, in the 2–0 win against Sutton United, Manset put Hereford in the lead after six minutes. However, after half an hour of play he was red carded for violent conduct after he reacted badly to a challenge by Alan Pouton. His first goal in League Two came in the 3–1 away win at Northampton Town on 1 December 2009. In late 2010 Manset enjoyed a run of goalscoring form under new manager Jamie Pitman, and was linked with a number of clubs from the Championship.

=== Reading ===
Manset signed for Championship team Reading for an undisclosed fee on a two-and-a-half-year contract on 21 January 2011. Manset made his debut for Reading on 22 January 2011, coming on as a substitute just 21 hours after signing for the club. On 1 February 2011, he scored his first goal for Reading after again coming on as a substitute, scoring what had looked to be an injury-time winner in the 2–2 draw at Cardiff City. On 4 February 2011, Manset came off the bench against league leaders Queens Park Rangers. On 19 March 2011, Manset came off the bench against Barnsley to score the winning goal in the 71st minute to keep Reading's promotion push alive. Manset made his first start against Nottingham Forest on 9 February 2011 in a 4–3 win. On 6 August 2011, Manset came on as a sub for Noel Hunt and scored two goals in three minutes to rescue a 2–2 draw for Reading against Millwall. His first was a 25-yard rocket and his second was a header from Jimmy Kebe's cross. Manset scored his fifth goal for Reading with a back-heel in the last minute of extra time in a 3–2 win over Bristol City.

=== Shanghai Shenhua (loan) ===
In 2011–12 season, Manset made six starts and scored two goals. In the last day of the transfer window, Crawley Town manager Steve Evans revealed that he had tried to sign Manset on a last minute deal only to be rejected. Reading manager Brian McDermott prepared to loan out Manset to afford him regular first-team football. He subsequently signed for Chinese club Shanghai Shenhua on loan until 30 June. He scored his first goal for Shenhua on 27 May 2012 during Shenhua's 2–1 victory at home against Guizhou Renhe. Manset scored 1 goal in 9 appearances for Shenhua.

=== Sion ===
On 13 July 2012, Manset moved from Reading to Sion on a 3-year contract for an undisclosed fee. Manset made his debut for Sion coming on as a second-half substitute and scoring the only goal from the penalty spot in a 1–0 victory over Servette. On 4 September 2012, Manset was suspended by Sion for 3 weeks after being found in the early hours of the morning in a Lausanne nightclub the day before Sion's game away to FC Zürich.

He made his first appearance for Sion since this suspension against FC Zürich on 30 September.

On 6 January, Manset announced through Twitter that his contract with Sion was terminated due to "irreconcilable differences".

=== Carlisle United ===
Following his departure from Sion he had trials at both Barnsley and Sheffield Wednesday, though neither club followed up on their interest. After another brief trial, he joined Carlisle United on 8 March until the end of the season, although the signing was delayed for two weeks waiting for international clearance. Manset finally made his debut against Yeovil Town on 23 March, coming on as a second-half substitute and helping Carlisle earn a 3–3 draw with an injury time assist. He made a further six appearances, all as a substitute, before being released at the end of the season following the expiry of his contract.

=== Coventry City ===
Manset signed a one-year deal with Coventry City on 7 August 2013 despite Coventry being under a transfer embargo. Having not played for the first team since October, his contract was terminated by mutual consent in January 2014.

=== Royal Antwerp ===
On 7 January 2014, Manset signed a one-and-a-half-year contract with Antwerp. His contract was terminated by mutual consent at the end of the season.

=== Walsall ===
On 26 August 2014, following a successful trial, Manset signed a one-year contract with Walsall. He scored his first goal for the Saddlers on 7 October 2014 against Rochdale in the Football League Trophy. Manset was released on 2 February 2015 after making twenty four appearances for the Saddlers, scoring one goal.

=== Cheltenham Town ===
Manset agreed a deal until the end of the 2014–15 season with Cheltenham Town on 3 February 2015. After twelve goalless appearances for the Robins, he was released on 4 May 2015 following their relegation from League Two.

=== Slavia Sofia ===
In August 2015, Manset signed a three-year contract with Bulgarian A Group team Slavia Sofia. On 16 August, he made his debut in a 1–0 away win over Botev Plovdiv, coming on as a substitute for the last eight minutes. Manset scored his only goal for the club on 7 December, netting a penalty in a 3–0 home win over Lokomotiv Plovdiv. Two days later, his contract was terminated by mutual consent.

=== Bastia ===
Manset joined Championnat National 3 side SC Bastia for the 2017–18 season. At the end of the season, he left the club after being unable to agree an extension.

=== A.C. Vicenza 1902 ===
In August 2018, he was signed by newly founded Italian amateur club "A.C. Vicenza 1902", an illegitimate phoenix club of Vicenza Calcio. The club, however, did not get a professional licence and let him go on a free transfer to Rotonda Calcio in Serie D.

=== FC Fleury 91 ===
In January 2019, he moved to FC Fleury 91.

In summer 2019, with one year left on his Fleury contract, Manset retired from playing. He started working as player agent.

== Career statistics ==
Appearances and goals by club, season and competition
| Club | Season | League | | | FA Cup | | League Cup | | Other | | Total | |
| Club | Season | Division | Apps | Goals | Apps | Goals | Apps | Goals | Apps | Goals | Apps | Goals |
|---|---|---|---|---|---|---|---|---|---|---|---|---|
| Hereford United | 2009–10 | League Two | 29 | 3 | 2 | 1 | 0 | 0 | 2 (Note: Appearances in the Football League Trophy) | 1 | 33 | 5 |
| Hereford United | 2010–11 | League Two | 21 | 7 | 4 | 6 | 1 | 0 | 0 | 0 | 26 | 13 |
| Hereford United | Total | | 50 | 10 | 6 | 7 | 1 | 0 | 2 | 1 | 59 | 18 |
| Reading | 2010–11 | Championship | 13 | 2 | 0 | 0 | 0 | 0 | 1 (Note: Appearance in the Championship play-offs) | 0 | 14 | 2 |
| Reading | 2011–12 | Championship | 15 | 3 | 1 | 0 | 1 | 0 | — | | 17 | 3 |
| Reading | Total | | 28 | 5 | 1 | 0 | 1 | 0 | 1 | 0 | 31 | 5 |
| Shanghai Shenhua (loan) | 2012 | Chinese Super League | 9 | 1 | 0 | 0 | — | | — | | 9 | 1 |
| Sion | 2012–13 | Swiss Super League | 5 | 1 | 0 | 0 | — | | — | | 5 | 1 |
| Carlisle United | 2012–13 | League One | 7 | 0 | 0 | 0 | 0 | 0 | 0 | 0 | 7 | 0 |
| Coventry City | 2013–14 | League One | 9 | 1 | 0 | 0 | 0 | 0 | 0 | 0 | 9 | 1 |
| Antwerp | 2013–14 | Belgian Second Division | 11 | 3 | 0 | 0 | — | | — | | 11 | 3 |
| Walsall | 2014–15 | League One | 19 | 0 | 2 | 0 | 0 | 0 | 3 (Note: Appearances in the Football League Trophy) | 1 | 24 | 1 |
| Cheltenham Town | 2014–15 | League Two | 12 | 0 | 0 | 0 | 0 | 0 | 0 | 0 | 12 | 0 |
| Slavia Sofia | 2015–16 | A Group | 9 | 1 | 0 | 0 | 0 | 0 | 0 | 0 | 9 | 1 |
| Marseille Consolat | 2015–16 | Championnat National | 13 | 2 | 0 | 0 | 0 | 0 | 0 | 0 | 13 | 2 |
| Hamrun Spartans | 2016–17 | Maltese Premier League | 11 | 2 | 1 | 0 | 0 | 0 | 0 | 0 | 12 | 2 |
| Bastia | 2017–18 | National 3 | 23 | 17 | 0 | 0 | 0 | 0 | 0 | 0 | 23 | 17 |
| Rotonda | 2018–19 | Serie D | 6 | 0 | 0 | 0 | 0 | 0 | 0 | 0 | 6 | 0 |
| Fleury 91 | 2018–19 | National 2 | 4 | 0 | 0 | 0 | 0 | 0 | 0 | 0 | 4 | 0 |
| Career total | | | 216 | 43 | 10 | 7 | 2 | 0 | 6 | 2 | 227 | 52 |

== Honours ==
Reading

- Football League Championship: 2011–12
