= Clebão =

Brazilian footballer (born 1983)

Personal information
- Full name: Cléber António de Oliveira
- Date of birth: 9 July 1983 (age 43)
- Place of birth: São Carlos, Brazil
- Height: 1.85 m (6 ft 1 in)
- Position: Defender

Youth career
- Santos

Senior career*
Years	Team	Apps	(Gls)
2003	Sãocarlense		
2004	Caldense		
2005–2009	São Carlos	63	(6)
2007	→ Guangzhou Pharmaceutical (loan)	23	(0)
2008	→ Mirassol (loan)		
2008–2009	→ União São João (loan)		
2009–2010	Nacional	9	(0)
2010	São Bento	14	(0)
2010	São Carlos		
2010	→ América-RN (loan)	20	(0)
2011–2013	Ceará	20	(1)
2012	→ América-RN (loan)	48	(4)
2013	→ Ituano (loan)	17	(1)
2013–2015	América-RN	73	(2)
2016–2017	Água Santa	8	(1)
2018	Hercílio Luz	10	(0)
2019	Comercial-SP	6	(0)
- * Club domestic league appearances and goals

Cléber António de Oliveira (born 9 July 1983), or simply Clebão or Cléber, is a Brazilian former professional footballer who played as a defender.

== Career ==
=== Brazil ===
After a brief stay with Santos FC, Clebão started his career with São Paulo state club Sãocarlense. In 2004, he moved to Campeonato Mineiro club Caldense. After one season with the club he moved to São Carlos and helped his new club capture the 2005 Campeonato Paulista Segunda Divisão.

=== China ===
In February 2007, Clebão was loaned out to China League One side Guangzhou Pharmaceutical for one season. He helped Guangzhou win the first place of China League One and promotion to the China Super League.

=== Return to Brazil ===
Following his loan stint in China he returned to São Carlos. His play with São Carlos led to interest from Campeonato Paulista Série A2 side União São João which took him on loan during the 2008 season.

While with São Carlos Clebão appeared in 63 matches (fourth most appearances with the club) and scored 6 goals.

=== Europe ===
Following the 2009 season Clebão started to receive offers from European clubs including Portugal's C.F. Os Belenenses and was reportedly close to signing with recently promoted 2. Bundesliga side FC Union Berlin. After the move fell through, he transferred to C.D. Nacional of the Portuguese Liga in August 2009 and made his debut for Nacional against Sporting CP on 15 August playing the full 90 in a 1–1 draw. During his time with Nacional he appeared in seven league matches and featured in one Europa League match.

== Honours ==
São Carlos

- Campeonato Paulista Série A4: 2005

Guangzhou Evergrande

- China League One: 2007
