= Wang Guanyi =

Chinese footballer

Wang Guanyi 王冠伊
Personal information
- Full name: Wang Guanyi
- Date of birth: April 9, 1989 (age 37)
- Place of birth: Tianjin, China
- Height: 1.88 m (6 ft 2 in)
- Position: Midfielder

Senior career*
Years	Team	Apps	(Gls)
2007–2009	Tianjin Locomotive	?	(?)
2010–2012	Shanghai Shenhua	17	(0)
2013–2016	Tianjin Teda	4	(0)
2016	→ Tianjin Locomotive (loan)	16	(2)
2017–2020	Hangzhou Greentown	44	(3)
- * Club domestic league appearances and goals as of 31 December 2020

Wang Guanyi (Chinese: 王冠伊 born 9 April 1989) is a Chinese former professional footballer.

== Club career ==
Wang Guanyi would start his professional football career with third tier football club Tianjin Locomotive before being scouted by top tier side Shanghai Shenhua, who he eventually joined at the beginning of the 2010 league season with team mates Feng Renliang and Song Boxuan. The Head coach Miroslav Blažević would then give Wang Guanyi his debut in a league game against Tianjin Teda F.C. on August 18, 2010 in a 1-0 victory where he came on as late substitute.

On November 7, 2012, Wang Guanyi's hometown club Tianjin Teda F.C. has confirmed that they have agreed to sign him from Shanghai Shenhua, on a free transfer and will sign a three-year contract with him. In March 2016, Wang was loaned to Tianjin Locomotive until 31 December 2016.

On 5 January 2017, Wang moved to League One side Hangzhou Greentown. He would make his debut on 12 March 2017 in a league game against Nei Mongol Zhongyou that ended in a 3-2 victory. On 8 March 2021, Wang officially announced his retirement from playing after he was unable to recover from injury before the start of the 2021 China League One season.

== Career statistics ==
Statistics accurate as of match played 31 December 2020.

Appearances and goals by club, season and competition
Club	Season	League			National Cup		Continental		Other		Total	
Club	Season	Division	Apps	Goals	Apps	Goals	Apps	Goals	Apps	Goals	Apps	Goals
Tianjin Locomotive	2007	China League Two			-		-		-			
Tianjin Locomotive	2008	China League Two			-		-		-			
Tianjin Locomotive	2009	China League Two			-		-		-			
Tianjin Locomotive	Total				0	0	0	0	0	0		
Shanghai Shenhua	2010	Chinese Super League	7	0	-		-		-		7	0
Shanghai Shenhua	2011	Chinese Super League	2	0	0	0	2	0	-		4	0
Shanghai Shenhua	2012	Chinese Super League	8	0	1	0	-		-		9	0
Shanghai Shenhua	Total		17	0	1	0	2	0	0	0	20	0
Tianjin Teda	2013	Chinese Super League	4	0	0	0	-		-		4	0
Tianjin Teda	2014	Chinese Super League	0	0	0	0	-		-		0	0
Tianjin Teda	2015	Chinese Super League	0	0	0	0	-		-		0	0
Tianjin Teda	Total		4	0	0	0	0	0	0	0	4	0
Tianjin Locomotive (loan)	2016	China League Two	16	2	1	0	-		-		17	2
Hangzhou Greentown	2017	China League One	23	2	0	0	-		-		23	2
Hangzhou Greentown	2018	China League One	10	0	0	0	-		-		10	0
Hangzhou Greentown	2019	China League One	3	0	1	0	-		-		4	0
Hangzhou Greentown	2020	China League One	8	1	0	0	-		0 (Note: Appearance(s) in CSL Relegation play-offs)	0	8	1
Hangzhou Greentown	Total		44	3	1	0	0	0	0	0	45	0
Career Total			81	5	3	0	2	0	0	0	86	5
