= Giovanni Moreno =

Colombian footballer (born 1986)

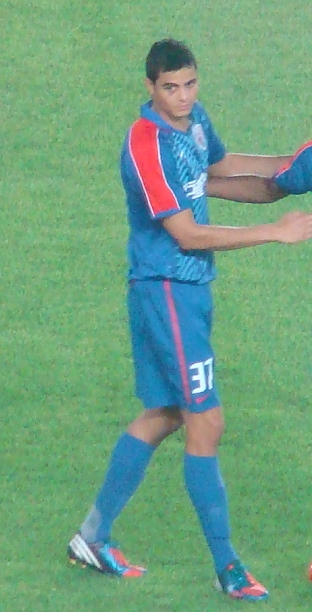
- Moreno with Shanghai Shenhua in 2012

Personal information
- Full name: Giovanni Andrés Moreno Cardona
- Date of birth: 1 July 1986 (age 40)
- Place of birth: Segovia, Colombia
- Height: 1.90 m (6 ft 3 in)
- Position: Attacking midfielder

Youth career
- Florida Soccer

Senior career*
Years	Team	Apps	(Gls)
2006–2008	Envigado	66	(40)
2008–2010	Atletico Nacional	67	(34)
2010–2012	Racing Club	47	(11)
2012–2021	Shanghai Shenhua	223	(71)
2022	Atletico Nacional	17	(3)
Total		420	(159)

International career
2008–2018	Colombia	21	(3)
- * Club domestic league appearances and goals

Giovanni Andrés Moreno Cardona (Spanish pronunciation: [ɟʝoˈβani moˈɾeno]; born 1 July 1986) is a Colombian former footballer who used to play for club Atlético Nacional where he primarily operated as an attacking midfielder.

== Club career ==
Moreno would start his career with top tier Colombian side Envigado in the 2006 league season, however in his debut season he would be part of the squad that was relegated to the second tier. The manager Jesús Barrios would show significant faith in Moreno who would go on to play a major part in guiding the team to the Categoría Primera B title and promotion back into the top tier at the end of the 2007 league season. In the club's first league game of the 2008 league season on 3 February 2008 Moreno would be included in the first team and also score his first top flight goal for the club in a 2–0 victory against Deportivo Pereira. He would continue his good form despite the step up in quality and after playing half the season for Envigado where he played in 22 games and scored 10 goals he would start to attract the interests of fellow top-tier club Atlético Nacional.

Moreno transferred to Atlético Nacional for 1.6 million Euros and he would go on to score his first goal for the club on 27 July 2008 in a league game against Once Caldas in a 2–0 victory. In his first full season for the club he would help guide them to the semi-finals of the 2009 Copa Colombia while personally becoming their top goalscorer of the season with 21 goals. The Colombian footballer joined Argentine Primera División side Racing Club for the 2010-11 season. Atlético Nacional received 4.3 million US dollars for 75% of Moreno's rights, half being paid by Racing and the other half by a third party entrepreneurial group. He would make his debut for the club in a league game on 14 August 2010 against Boca Juniors in a 2–1 victory. This was followed by his first goal for the club, which was in a league game on 18 September 2010 against Club Atlético Lanús in a 4–0 win. His season would come to a premature end when on 13 February 2011 in league game against All Boys when he sustained a posterior cruciate ligament injury in the knee, ruling him out for eight months. Upon his return Moreno would soon regain his position in the team, however after a series of disappointing results Moreno and teammate Federico Santander would receive death threats that reached its escalation point on Tuesday, 22 May 2012, after training when both men were held at gunpoint by a gang who told them to play better or have their legs blown off.

After the incident in Argentina, Moreno left to join Chinese Super League club Shanghai Shenhua on June 24, 2012, on a two-year contract with the option of a further two years for 9 million dollars. He would go on to make his debut in a league game on July 1, 2012, against Qingdao Jonoon F.C. away in a 1–0 defeat. This was followed by his first goal for the club in a league game against Guangzhou Evergrande on July 28, 2012, in a 2–2 draw. The following season would see the owners of the club have a shareholders dispute, which ultimately saw the club's biggest shareholder Zhu Jun eventually leaving, causing a gap in the club finances resulting in unpaid wages forcing Moreno to refuse to play the March 31, 2013 league game against Liaoning Whowin. He would return to playing for Shenhua and the club would go on to find themselves a new majority shareholder in Greenland Holding Group Company Limited. For his loyalty with remaining with Shenhua the club made Moreno their captain and he extended his stay in China by signing a two-year contract extension with Shenhua in July 2015. This would then see him become the club's top league goalscorer with 43 goals when he scored against Beijing Guoan on July 23, 2017, in a 2–1 defeat. At the end of the season Moreno would win his first piece of silverware with the club when he captained Shenhua to the 2017 Chinese FA Cup.

== International career ==
Moreno was given his international debut by Eduardo Lara in a friendly against Nigeria on 20 November 2008 coming on as a substitute in a 1–0 victory.

In May 2018 he was named in Colombia's preliminary 35 man squad for the 2018 World Cup in Russia. However, he did not make the final cut to 23.

== Career statistics ==
=== Club ===
Appearances and goals by club, season and competition
Club	Season	League			National Cup		Continental		Other		Total	
Club	Season	Division	Apps	Goals	Apps	Goals	Apps	Goals	Apps	Goals	Apps	Goals
Envigado	2006	Categoría Primera A	2	0	—		—		—		2	0
Envigado	2007	Categoría Primera B	42	30	—		—		—		42	30
Envigado	2008	Categoría Primera A	22	10	—		—		—		22	10
Envigado	Total		66	40	—		—		—		66	40
Atlético Nacional	2008	Categoría Primera A	16	7	—		—		—		16	7
Atlético Nacional	2009	Categoría Primera A	34	16	8	5	—		—		42	21
Atlético Nacional	2010	Categoría Primera A	17	11	6	5	—		—		23	16
Atlético Nacional	Total		67	34	14	10	—		—		81	44
Racing Club	2010–11	Argentine Primera División	16	5	—		—		—		16	5
Racing Club	2011–12	Argentine Primera División	31	6	3	1	—		—		34	7
Racing Club	Total		47	11	3	1	—		—		50	12
Shanghai Shenhua	2012	Chinese Super League	14	2	2	0	—		—		16	2
Shanghai Shenhua	2013	Chinese Super League	21	10	0	0	—		—		21	10
Shanghai Shenhua	2014	Chinese Super League	27	8	5	3	—		—		32	11
Shanghai Shenhua	2015	Chinese Super League	26	6	4	1	—		—		30	7
Shanghai Shenhua	2016	Chinese Super League	26	9	4	1	—		—		30	10
Shanghai Shenhua	2017	Chinese Super League	26	15	7	0	1 (Note: Appearances in AFC Champions League)	0	—		34	15
Shanghai Shenhua	2018	Chinese Super League	27	5	0	0	6	3	1 (Note: Appearance in Chinese FA Super Cup)	0	34	8
Shanghai Shenhua	2019	Chinese Super League	28	11	5	2	—		—		33	13
Shanghai Shenhua	2020	Chinese Super League	14	3	0	0	3	3	—		17	6
Shanghai Shenhua	2021	Chinese Super League	14	2	5	2	—		—		19	4
Shanghai Shenhua	Total		223	71	32	9	10	6	1	0	266	89
Atlético Nacional	2022	Categoría Primera A	17	3	2	1	1	0	—		20	4
Career total			420	159	51	21	11	6	1	0	483	184

=== International ===
As of match played 27 March 2018.

Colombia
Year	Apps	Goals
2008	1	0
2009	4	1
2010	7	2
2011	1	0
2012	1	0
2017	6	0
2018	1	0
Total	21	3

International goals

Scores and results list Colombia's goal tally first.

No	Date	Venue	Opponent	Score	Result	Competition
1.	30 September 2009	Cotton Bowl, Dallas, United States	Mexico	1–0	2–1	Friendly
2.	10 October 2009	Estadio Atanasio Girardot, Medellín, Colombia	Chile	2–2	2–4	2010 FIFA World Cup qualification
3.	27 May 2010	Soccer City Stadium, Johannesburg, South Africa	South Africa	1–1	1–2	Friendly

== Honours ==
Envigado

- Categoría Primera B: 2007

Shanghai Shenhua

- Chinese FA Cup: 2017, 2019

Atlético Nacional

- Categoría Primera A: 2022
