= Zhang Li (footballer, born February 1989) =

Chinese footballer

Zhang Li 张礼
Personal information
- Date of birth: February 28, 1989 (age 37)
- Place of birth: Shenyang, Liaoning, China
- Height: 1.78 m (5 ft 10 in)
- Position: Midfielder

Senior career*
Years	Team	Apps	(Gls)
2007–2011	Chongqing Lifan	21	(4)
2011	→ Chengdu Blades (loan)	10	(0)
2012–2013	Chengdu Blades	15	(0)
2014–2015	Jiangxi Liansheng	22	(0)
- * Club domestic league appearances and goals as of 1 November 2015

Zhang Li (Chinese: 张礼; born 28 February 1989) is a Chinese football player who currently plays for China League Two side Jiangxi Liansheng.

== Club career ==
In 2007, Zhang Li started his professional footballer career with Chongqing Lifan in the China League One. On 2 May 2009, he made his debut for Chongqing in the 2009 Chinese Super League against Hangzhou Greentown. In March 2011, Zhang moved to Chinese Super League side Chengdu Blades on a one-year loan deal.

In 2014, Zhang transferred to China League Two side Jiangxi Liansheng.

== Club career statistics ==
Statistics accurate as of match played 1 November 2015.

Club performance			League		Cup		League Cup		Continental		Total	
Season	Club	League	Apps	Goals	Apps	Goals	Apps	Goals	Apps	Goals	Apps	Goals
China PR			League		FA Cup		CSL Cup		Asia		Total	
2007	Chongqing Lifan	China League One	5	1	-		-		-		5	1
2008	Chongqing Lifan	China League One	9	3	-		-		-		9	3
2009	Chongqing Lifan	Chinese Super League	4	0	-		-		-		4	0
2010	Chongqing Lifan	Chinese Super League	2	0	-		-		-		2	0
2011	Chengdu Blades	Chinese Super League	10	0	1	0	-		-		11	0
2012	Chengdu Blades	China League One	0	0	0	0	-		-		0	0
2013	Chengdu Blades	China League One	15	0	1	0	-		-		16	0
2014	Jiangxi Liansheng	China League Two	7	0	1	0	-		-		8	0
2015	Jiangxi Liansheng	China League One	15	0	2	0	-		-		17	0
Total	China PR		68	4	5	0	0	0	0	0	73	4
