= Dady =

Cape Verdean footballer (born 1981)

Personal information
- Full name: Eduardo Fernandes Pereira Gomes
- Date of birth: 13 August 1981 (age 45)
- Place of birth: Lisbon, Portugal
- Height: 1.91 m (6 ft 3 in)
- Position: Striker

Youth career
- 1989–1993: Futebol Benfica
- 1993–1995: Sporting CP
- 1995–1999: Futebol Benfica
- 1999–2000: Boavista

Senior career*
| Years | Team | Apps | (Gls) |
| 2000–2001 | Sporting B | 19 | (5) |
| 2001–2002 | Aldenovense | 21 | (10) |
| 2002–2005 | Odivelas | 93 | (26) |
| 2005 | Estoril | 14 | (6) |
| 2006–2007 | Belenenses | 38 | (12) |
| 2007–2010 | Osasuna | 54 | (11) |
| 2010 | Bucaspor | 5 | (0) |
| 2011–2012 | Olhanense | 30 | (8) |
| 2012–2013 | Apollon Limassol | 10 | (2) |
| 2013 | Shanghai Shenhua | 27 | (9) |
| 2014 | Xinjiang Tianshan Leopard | 5 | (0) |
| 2014–2015 | Atlético | 16 | (0) |
| 2015–2016 | Futebol Benfica | | |
| Total | | 332 | (89) |

International career
| 2005–2012 | Cape Verde | 23 | (5) |
- * Club domestic league appearances and goals

Eduardo Fernandes Pereira Gomes (born 13 August 1981), known as Dady, is a Cape Verdean former professional footballer who played as a striker.

== Club career ==
During his early years, Lisbon-born Dady played professionally with modest clubs in the Portuguese lower leagues, after unsuccessful stints with Boavista F.C. and Sporting CP. In the 2005–06 season he started with second division side G.D. Estoril Praia but, after solid performances, attracted the attention of Primeira Liga's C.F. Os Belenenses.

Dady's first match in the top level was on 14 January 2006, in a 0–1 home loss against Sporting where he came on as 78th-minute substitute. After an uneventful first half-season he was a key attacking figure in 2006–07 campaign, scoring 12 goals as Belenenses finished fifth and qualified for the UEFA Cup.

In August 2007, Dady signed with La Liga club CA Osasuna. Not an undisputed starter in his first season, he still finished as the Navarrese's top scorer, helping it barely avoid relegation; in the following two campaigns he featured even less regularly, due to physical problems – which included the extraction of a benign tumor in his femur– and the resurrection of veteran player Walter Pandiani.

In the summer of 2010, Dady signed with Bucaspor in Turkey, being released on 30 December and returning to Portugal in the following transfer window, with S.C. Olhanense. He netted seven times in 23 games in his first full season, being crucial as the Algarve team eventually avoided top flight relegation.

On 17 July 2012, Dady signed for Apollon Limassol of the Cypriot First Division. On 28 February of the following year he moved clubs and countries again, joining China's Shanghai Shenhua FC.

In March 2014, Dady joined another team in the country, China League One's Xinjiang Tianshan Leopard FC. He returned to Portugal and its second tier in August, with the 33-year-old agreeing to a one-year contract at Atlético Clube de Portugal.

== International career ==
Dady made his debut for Cape Verde on 17 August 2005 against Angola.

=== International goals ===
| # | Date | Venue | Opponent | Score | Result | Competition |
|---|---|---|---|---|---|---|
| 1 | 15 June 2008 | George V, Curepipe, Mauritius | Mauritius | 0–1 | 0–1 | 2010 World Cup qualification |
| 2 | 22 June 2008 | Várzea, Praia, Cape Verde | Mauritius | 1–0 | 3–1 | 2010 World Cup qualification |
| 3 | 22 June 2008 | Várzea, Praia, Cape Verde | Mauritius | 2–0 | 3–1 | 2010 World Cup qualification |
| 4 | 29 February 2012 | Mahamasina, Antananarivo, Madagascar | Madagascar | 0–2 | 0–4 | 2013 Africa Cup of Nations qualification |
