= You Yuanwen =

Chinese footballer

You Yuanwen 由元文
Personal information
- Full name: You Yuanwen
- Date of birth: April 23, 1986 (age 40)
- Place of birth: Dalian, Liaoning, China
- Height: 1.82 m (6 ft 0 in)
- Positions: Defender; midfielder; striker

Team information
- Current team: Sichuan Longfor
- Number: 48

Senior career*
Years	Team	Apps	(Gls)
2007–2010	Henan Jianye	5	(0)
2011–2012	Shanghai Shenhua	3	(0)
2013	Qingdao Hainiu	13	(0)
2014–	Sichuan Longfor	32	(0)
- * Club domestic league appearances and goals as of 4 November 2018

You Yuanwen (Chinese: 由元文 born 23 April 1986) is a Chinese football player who currently plays for Sichuan Longfor in the China League One.

== Club career ==
You Yuanwen started his career playing for the top-tier side Henan Jianye during the 2007 league season and was eventually given his chance to make his senior league debut for the club when the manager Jia Xiuquan let him come on as a late substitute for Xiao Zhi on March 30, 2008, against Beijing Guoan in a 2–0 defeat. After making several further substitute appearances he was unable to make an impact on the pitch and was soon dropped from the team. However, he still remain with the club for several further seasons and saw a succession of managers come through the club before Jo Bonfrere decided to release him at the end of the 2010 league season.

Halfway through the 2011 league season top-tier side Shanghai Shenhua decided to bring You Yuanwen in on a free transfer after the club needed a striker after losing Duvier Riascos and Dong Xuesheng to other teams as well as Luis Salmerón to injury. You Yuanwen made his debut for the club on August 6, 2011, against Henan Jianye in a 2–1 defeat where he came on as substitute for Feng Renliang.
