= Wang Yang (footballer, born 1991) =

Chinese footballer (born 1991)

Wang Yang 王阳
Personal information
- Date of birth: 12 October 1991 (age 35)
- Place of birth: Taixing, Jiangsu, China
- Height: 1.78 m (5 ft 10 in)
- Position: Midfielder

Youth career
- Shanghai Shenhua

Senior career*
Years	Team	Apps	(Gls)
2011–2014	Shanghai Shenhua	5	(0)
2011	→ Sūduva (Loan)	1	(0)
2015–2017	Zhejiang Dacheng		
2018	Taizhou Yuanda		
- * Club domestic league appearances and goals as of 30 October 2012

Wang Yang (born 12 October 1991) is a Chinese professional football player who currently plays for Taizhou Yuanda in the China League Two. He is the brother of footballer Wang Gang who currently plays for Beijing Renhe.

== Club career ==
Wang Yang started his career playing for the Shanghai Shenhua youth team before being promoted to the senior team at the beginning of the 2011 Chinese Super League season. He would soon be loaned out to top tier Lithuanian side Sūduva half way through their league season and make his debut for the club on July 7, 2011 in a 2011–12 UEFA Europa League qualifying game against Elfsborg in a game that Sūduva lost 3-0. As the Lithuanian 2011 A Lyga season continued Wang Yang was rarely used and only made one league appearance against Šiauliai on July 24 in a 1-0 defeat before he eventually returned to China at the end of the season. Upon his return to Shenhua he would make his debut for the club as a substitute against Shandong Luneng in a league game on April 28, 2012 that Shenhua drew 0-0.
