= Xu Liang (footballer) =

Chinese footballer

Xu Liang 徐亮
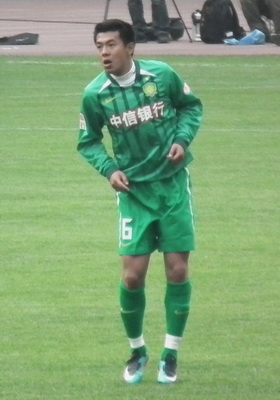

Personal information
- Full name: Xu Liang
- Date of birth: 12 August 1981 (age 45)
- Place of birth: Shenyang, Liaoning, China
- Height: 1.83 m (6 ft 0 in)
- Position: Midfielder

Youth career
- 2000–2001: Liaoning FC

Senior career*
Years	Team	Apps	(Gls)
2002–2006	Liaoning FC	113	(26)
2007–2009	Guangzhou Pharmaceutical	68	(29)
2010–2012	Beijing Guoan	77	(19)
2013–2014	Shanghai Shenhua	38	(6)
2016–2018	Shenzhen FC	53	(6)

International career^{‡}
2000–2001	China U20		
2002–2003	China U23		
2002–2006	China	8	(1)
Medal record
Men's football
Representing China
East Asian Games
Bronze medal – third place	1997 Busan	Football
AFC Youth Championship
Bronze medal – third place	2000 َ Iran	Team
- * Club domestic league appearances and goals as of 3 November 2018 ‡ National team caps and goals as of 2 November 2014

Xu Liang (Chinese: 徐亮; pinyin: Xú Liàng; Mandarin pronunciation: [ɕy̌ ljâŋ]; born 12 August 1981 in Shenyang) is a Chinese former footballer.

== Club career ==
Xu Liang started his football career with the youth systems of Liaoning FC in 2001 and eventually graduated to their first team in the 2002 league season where he made 23 appearances in his debut season. After establishing himself into the first team, he would be an integral member that saw Liaoning reach the final of the Chinese FA Cup in 2002. Off the field on 6 December 2004, he aided in the rescue of an injured woman who was involved in a car crash in Shenyang before taking her to hospital. After five seasons with Liaoning the club admitted they were in deep financial crisis and Xu was allowed to leave the club with Beijing Guoan interested in his services, however the two club's could not agree upon the 5.5 million Yuan transfer fee.

Xu would have trails with Dutch club Heracles Almelo and Russian club FC Torpedo Moscow, however any transfer fell through with neither team could willing to agree upon a reported one million Euros transfer fee. On 31 December 2006, he would transfer to second-tier team Guangzhou Pharmaceutical for 3 million Yuan. In his debut season he would quickly establish himself as vital member within the team's midfield and helped see the team win the league and gain promotion to the Chinese Super League in 2007. He would help establish Guangzhou within the top tier and was made vice-captain within the team, however his outspoken personality saw him publicly criticise his teammate, Zhou Lin for having a bad game against Beijing Guoan on 28 June 2009, in a 1–1 draw, which saw infighting between the two breakout and Zhou being frozen out of the team. Xu's outspoken personality was not limited to his own teammates and 24 October 2009, against Qingdao Jonoon in a 0–0 draw he would verbally tirade the referee for his decision making, which resulted in Xu receiving a five-game suspension.

On 12 February 2010, he was signed by Beijing Guoan after Guangzhou was relegated due to a match-fixing scandal. On 4 August 2012, Xu scored from a distance of 62 meters in a league match against Dalian Shide, which is the longest goal scored in Chinese top tier history.

Xu transferred to fellow Chinese Super League side Shanghai Shenhua on 11 December 2012. After an injury plagued period with Shanghai, Xu decided to retire from football at the end of the 2014 season.

On 3 February 2016, Xu came out of retirement and joined China League One club Shenzhen FC

== International career ==
Xu Liang would play for the Chinese under-20 football team and would make the squad for the 2001 FIFA World Youth Championship where China were knocked out in the last 16 by Argentina. After the tournament he was promoted to the Chinese under-23 football team but was dropped from the squad on 26 January 2002, along with Lu Jiang and Zhang Shuai for breaking team curfew rules to go out clubbing. Xu was eventually brought back into the team where he participated in the 2002 Asian Games, which saw China reach the quarterfinals.

== Career statistics ==
=== Club statistics ===
Statistics accurate as of match played 3 November 2018.

Club performance			League		Cup		League Cup		Continental		Total	
Season	Club	League	Apps	Goals	Apps	Goals	Apps	Goals	Apps	Goals	Apps	Goals
China PR			League		FA Cup		CSL Cup		Asia		Total	
2002	Liaoning F.C.	Chinese Jia-A League	23	0	7	1	-		-		30	1
2003	Liaoning F.C.	Chinese Jia-A League	26	5	3	0	-		-		29	5
2004	Liaoning F.C.	Chinese Super League	18	5	0	0	1	0	-		19	5
2005	Liaoning F.C.	Chinese Super League	20	10	4	1	2	0	-		26	11
2006	Liaoning F.C.	Chinese Super League	26	6	1	0	-		-		27	6
2007	Guangzhou Pharmaceutical	China League One	22	12	-		-		-		22	12
2008	Guangzhou Pharmaceutical	Chinese Super League	23	7	-		-		-		23	7
2009	Guangzhou Pharmaceutical	Chinese Super League	23	10	-		-		-		23	10
2010	Beijing Guoan	Chinese Super League	21	4	-		-		6	0	27	4
2011	Beijing Guoan	Chinese Super League	28	8	4	1	-		-		32	9
2012	Beijing Guoan	Chinese Super League	28	7	1	2	-		5	0	34	9
2013	Shanghai Greenland	Chinese Super League	15	3	1	0	-		-		16	3
2014	Shanghai Greenland	Chinese Super League	23	3	4	0	-		-		27	3
2016	Shenzhen F.C.	China League One	21	2	0	0	-		-		21	2
2017	Shenzhen F.C.	China League One	27	4	0	0	-		-		27	4
2018	Shenzhen F.C.	China League One	5	0	0	0	-		-		5	0
Total	China PR		349	86	25	5	3	0	11	0	387	91

=== International goals ===
Results list China's goal tally first.

#	Date	Venue	Opponent	Score	Result	Competition
1	10 August 2006	(China) Qinhuangdao	Thailand	4–0	4–0	Friendly international

== Honours ==
=== Club ===
Guangzhou Pharmaceutical

- China League One: 2007

=== Individual ===
- Chinese Football Association Young Player of the Year: 2002
- Chinese Super League Team of the Year: 2004, 2009
