= Fei Yu =

Chinese footballer

Fei Yu 费煜
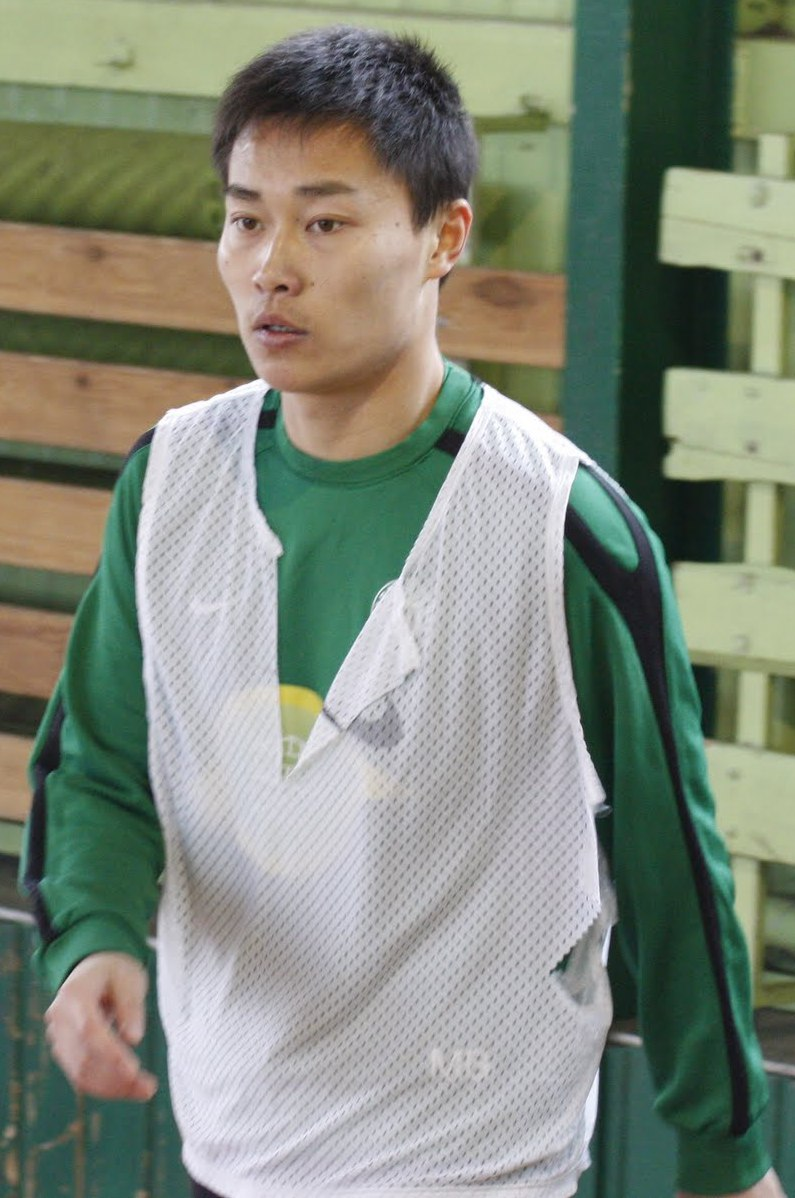
- Fei with Warta Poznań in 2013

Personal information
- Full name: Fei Yu
- Date of birth: 6 February 1991 (age 35)
- Place of birth: Shanghai, China
- Height: 1.78 m (5 ft 10 in)
- Position: Defensive midfielder

Senior career*
Years	Team	Apps	(Gls)
2010–2012	Shanghai Shenhua	3	(0)
2013	Warta Poznań	1	(0)
2013–2014	Sertanense	9	(0)
2014–2018	Shenzhen Ruby	82	(3)
2019–2021	Nantong Zhiyun	58	(6)
2022–2023	Dalian Pro	45	(4)
2024–2025	Dalian Yingbo	28	(4)
- * Club domestic league appearances and goals as of 31 December 2025

Fei Yu (simplified Chinese: 费煜; traditional Chinese: 費煜; pinyin: Fèi Yù; born 6 February 1991) is a Chinese former professional footballer who played as a defensive midfielder.

== Club career ==
Fei Yu was promoted to the senior squad of top-tier club Shanghai Shenhua during the 2010 season, however it wasn't until the end of the 2011 season that he made his debut in a 0–0 draw against Nanchang Hengyuan on 29 October 2011. After only playing in three games for the club he would not renew his contract out of a desire for competitive opportunities elsewhere.

On 2 March 2013, it was announced that Fei had reached an agreement to join Polish I liga team Warta Poznań. Fei made his debut on 13 April 2013, coming on as substitute against Olimpia Grudziądz in a 1–0 defeat. He would however be released by the club less than a week later. Fei would go to Portugal to sign with Campeonato Nacional de Seniores side Sertanense in September 2013 and he made his debut for the club on 1 December 2013 in a 2–1 win against Carapinheirense.

On 30 July 2014, Fei returned to China when he transferred to China League One side Shenzhen Ruby. He would go on to establish himself as a regular within the team. By the end of the 2018 China League One campaign he would play an integral part within the team that came runners-up in the division and gained promotion to the top tier. Despite the promotion, with his contract ending he was free to leave and on 26 February 2019, Fei transferred to League One newcomer Nantong Zhiyun.

On 21 April 2022 he joined top-tier club Dalian Pro for the start of the 2022 Chinese Super League season. He made his debut in a league game on 4 June 2022 against Henan Songshan Longmen in a match that ended in a 2–2 draw. He would go on to establish himself as a vital member of the team and score his first goal for the club in a league game on 1 September 2022 against his former club Shenzhen F.C. in a 5–1 victory.

On 14 June 2025, Fei finished his last professional football game at the home win against Meizhou Hakka.

== Career statistics ==
Statistics accurate as of match played 31 December 2025.

Appearances and goals by club, season and competition
Club	Season	League			National Cup		Continental		Other		Total	
Club	Season	Division	Apps	Goals	Apps	Goals	Apps	Goals	Apps	Goals	Apps	Goals
Shanghai Shenhua	2010	Chinese Super League	0	0	-		-		-		0	0
Shanghai Shenhua	2011	Chinese Super League	1	0	0	0	0	0	-		1	0
Shanghai Shenhua	2012	Chinese Super League	2	0	0	0	-		-		2	0
Shanghai Shenhua	Total		3	0	0	0	0	0	0	0	3	0
Warta Poznań	2012–13	I liga	1	0	0	0	-		-		1	0
Sertanense	2013–14	Campeonato	9	0	0	0	-		-		9	0
Shenzhen FC	2014	China League One	12	0	0	0	-		-		12	0
Shenzhen FC	2015	China League One	5	1	1	0	-		-		6	1
Shenzhen FC	2016	China League One	23	1	1	0	-		-		24	1
Shenzhen FC	2017	China League One	24	1	2	0	-		-		26	1
Shenzhen FC	2018	China League One	18	0	1	0	-		-		19	0
Shenzhen FC	Total		82	3	5	0	0	0	0	0	87	3
Nantong Zhiyun	2019	China League One	20	1	1	0	-		-		21	1
Nantong Zhiyun	2020	China League One	14	1	-		-		-		14	1
Nantong Zhiyun	2021	China League One	24	4	1	0	-		-		25	4
Nantong Zhiyun	Total		58	6	2	0	0	0	0	0	60	6
Dalian Professional	2022	Chinese Super League	28	4	0	0	-		-		28	4
Dalian Professional	2023	Chinese Super League	17	0	3	0	-		-		20	0
Dalian Professional	Total		45	4	3	0	0	0	0	0	48	4
Dalian Yingbo	2024	China League One	23	4	1	0	-		-		24	4
Dalian Yingbo	2025	Chinese Super League	5	0	0	0	-		-		5	0
Dalian Yingbo	Total		28	4	1	0	0	0	0	0	29	4
Career total			226	17	11	0	0	0	0	0	237	17
