= Zheng Kaimu =

Chinese footballer

Zheng Kaimu 郑凯木
Personal information
- Date of birth: 28 January 1992 (age 34)
- Place of birth: Huangshi, Hubei, China
- Height: 1.85 m (6 ft 1 in)
- Positions: Defender; defensive midfielder

Team information
- Current team: Wuhan Three Towns
- Number: 13

Youth career
- 2000–2006: Genbao Football Base
- 2008: Wuhan Optics Valley

Senior career*
Years	Team	Apps	(Gls)
2009	Wuhan Zall	?	(?)
2009–2010	Shanghai East Asia	8	(0)
2011	Chongqing FC	21	(0)
2012–2017	Shanghai Shenhua	60	(1)
2017	→ Shijiazhuang Ever Bright (loan)	28	(1)
2018	Guizhou Hengfeng	21	(5)
2019–2020	Tianjin Teda	40	(4)
2021–2024	Cangzhou Mighty Lions	84	(2)
2025–	Wuhan Three Towns	34	(0)
- * Club domestic league appearances and goals as of 22 November 2026

Zheng Kaimu (Chinese: 郑凯木; pinyin: Zhèng Kǎimǔ; born 28 January 1992) is a professional Chinese footballer who plays as a defender or defensive midfielder for Chinese Super League side Wuhan Three Towns.

== Club career ==
While Zheng Kaimu was born in Huangshi, Hubei, he would move to Shanghai to join the Genbao Football Base where he spent several years studying before moving back to Hubei and joining the Wuhan Optics Valley youth team. Unfortunately for him, his club would decide to disband before he had the chance to graduate to the senior team, however luckily for Zheng the local Hubei government decided to form a new team using the Wuhan Optics Valley youth team and play within the third tier of the Chinese pyramid as Hubei Greenery. After only spending six months with the club Zheng would have the chance to return to Shanghai to join Genbao Football Base's senior football club Shanghai East Asia and play within the second tier. Zheng would, however have to wait until the following season before he made his debut for the club on April 22, 2010 in a league game against Hunan Billows in 2-1 defeat. By the end of the season Zheng would not be able to establish himself as regular member of the team and was allowed to leave the club to join third-tier club Chongqing F.C.

Within Chongqing F.C. Zheng would go on to establish himself as a regular within the squad as they won promotion and came runners-up within the league. His performances for Chongqing F.C. would attract the interests of top-tier club Shanghai Shenhua where he would go on to make his debut on 10 March 2012 in a league game against Jiangsu Sainty that ended in a 1-1 draw. On 15 February 2017, Zheng was loaned to League One side Shijiazhuang Ever Bright until 31 December 2017.

On 26 February 2018, Zheng transferred to fellow Chinese Super League side Guizhou Hengfeng. He made his debut on 4 March 2018 in a league game against Jiangsu Suning that ended in a 3-1 defeat. Zheng transferred to Super League side Tianjin TEDA in February 2019 after Guizhou Hengfeng were relegated to the second-tier. Making his debut on 3 March 2019 in a league game against Jiangsu Suning, once again he was on the losing team as the match also saw him receive a red card as the game ended in a 3-2 defeat. After two seasons at Tianjin, Zheng would join another top tier club in Cangzhou Mighty Lions on 8 April 2021. He would go on to make his debut in a league game on 21 April 2021 against Qingdao F.C. in a 2-1 defeat.

== Career statistics ==
As of 31 December 2024.

Appearances and goals by club, season and competition
Club	Season	League			National Cup		Continental		Other		Total	
Club	Season	Division	Apps	Goals	Apps	Goals	Apps	Goals	Apps	Goals	Apps	Goals
Wuhan Zall	2009	China League Two			-		-		-			
Shanghai East Asia	2009	China League One	0	0	-		-		-		0	0
Shanghai East Asia	2010	China League One	8	0	-		-		-		8	0
Shanghai East Asia	Total		8	0	0	0	0	0	0	0	8	0
Chongqing F.C.	2011	China League Two	21	0	-		-		-		21	0
Shanghai Shenhua	2012	Chinese Super League	15	1	0	0	-		-		15	1
Shanghai Shenhua	2013	Chinese Super League	15	0	1	0	-		-		16	0
Shanghai Shenhua	2014	Chinese Super League	16	0	4	0	-		-		20	0
Shanghai Shenhua	2015	Chinese Super League	8	0	4	0	-		-		12	0
Shanghai Shenhua	2016	Chinese Super League	6	0	2	0	-		-		8	0
Shanghai Shenhua	Total		60	1	11	0	0	0	0	0	71	1
Shijiazhuang Ever Bright (Loan)	2017	China League One	28	1	1	0	-		-		29	1
Guizhou Hengfeng	2018	Chinese Super League	21	5	3	1	-		-		24	6
Tianjin TEDA	2019	Chinese Super League	25	4	0	0	-		-		25	4
Tianjin TEDA	2020	Chinese Super League	15	0	5	1	-		-		20	1
Tianjin TEDA	Total		40	4	5	1	0	0	0	0	45	5
Cangzhou Mighty Lions	2021	Chinese Super League	20	0	0	0	-		-		20	0
Cangzhou Mighty Lions	2022	Chinese Super League	12	1	0	0	-		-		12	1
Cangzhou Mighty Lions	2023	Chinese Super League	27	0	1	0	-		-		28	0
Cangzhou Mighty Lions	2024	Chinese Super League	25	1	1	0	-		-		26	1
Cangzhou Mighty Lions	Total		84	2	2	0	0	0	0	0	86	2
Career total			262	13	22	2	0	0	0	0	284	15
