= Qiu Tianyi =

Chinese footballer

Qiu Tianyi 邱添一
Personal information
- Full name: Qiu Tianyi
- Date of birth: January 31, 1989 (age 37)
- Place of birth: Shenyang, Liaoning, China
- Height: 1.92 m (6 ft 3 1/2 in)
- Position: Defender

Youth career
- Dalian Yiteng

Senior career*
| Years | Team | Apps | (Gls) |
| 2006–2009 | Harbin Yiteng | 50 | (0) |
| 2010–2012 | Shanghai Shenhua | 27 | (1) |
| 2013–2016 | Wuhan Zall | 73 | (0) |
| 2017–2022 | Tianjin Teda | 29 | (1) |
| 2023 | Dandong Tengyue | 22 | (0) |
| 2024–2025 | Shanghai Jiading Huilong | 36 | (0) |

International career^{‡}
| 2007–2009 | China U20 | 5 | (0) |
| 2010–2011 | China U23 | 1 | (1) |
- * Club domestic league appearances and goals as of 31 December 2024 ‡ National team caps and goals as of 30 October 2012

Qiu Tianyi (Chinese: 邱添一 born 31 January 1989 Shenyang, Liaoning) is a professional Chinese footballer.

== Club career ==
As a youngster Qiu Tianyi was encouraged by his father to become a footballer and by the 2006 Chinese league season he achieved this goal when he was promoted to the senior team of third tier football club Harbin Yiteng F.C. who won promotion to the second tier after the club came runners-up to Beijing Institute of Technology FC at the end of the season. By the following season Qiu went on to establish himself as a regular within the squad and played in twenty games throughout the season as the club survived relegation and finished twelfth, however while he cemented his place within the team by playing in eighteen more games he could not help the team avoid relegation at the end of the 2008 league season when the club finished bottom of the league. While Qiu remained with the club he could not aid the club to an immediate promotion and they finished in a disappointing fifth within the group stages.

At the beginning of the 2010 league season Qiu moved to top-tier side Shanghai Shenhua, however due to a broken arm he missed the majority of the season until November 6, 2010 when he made his debut for the club in a league game against Shandong Luneng in a 5-2 defeat where he came on as a late substitute. By the following season Qiu gained more playing time and made ten appearances throughout the season however it wasn't until the 2012 league season that Qiu became a regular within the team and scored his first goal for the club on May 6, 2012 in a league game against Liaoning Whowin F.C. in a 1-1 draw.

On 9 January 2017, Qiu moved to Super League side Tianjin Teda. He would make his debut in league game on 2 April 2017 against Chongqing Dangdai Lifan F.C. in a 2-0 victory.

== International career ==
After becoming a regular for Harbin Yiteng, Qiu was soon called up to the Chinese U-20 team and was included in the squad that took part in the 2008 AFC U-19 Championship. Within the tournament he played in three games as China were knocked out by Uzbekistan in the quarter-finals on November 8, 2008 in a 4-3 penalty shootout after a 0-0 draw. On June 23, 2010 Qiu was promoted to the Chinese U-23 team and play in a friendly against a local Chinese team Hunan Billows F.C. where Qiu scored in his debut within a game that China lost 2-1.

== Career statistics ==
Statistics accurate as of match played 31 December 2024.

Appearances and goals by club, season and competition
| Club | Season | League | | | National Cup | | Continental | | Other | | Total | |
| Club | Season | Division | Apps | Goals | Apps | Goals | Apps | Goals | Apps | Goals | Apps | Goals |
|---|---|---|---|---|---|---|---|---|---|---|---|---|
| Harbin Yiteng | 2006 | China League Two | 0 | 0 | - | | - | | - | | 0 | 0 |
| Harbin Yiteng | 2007 | China League One | 20 | 0 | - | | - | | - | | 20 | 0 |
| Harbin Yiteng | 2008 | China League One | 18 | 0 | - | | - | | - | | 18 | 0 |
| Harbin Yiteng | 2009 | China League Two | 12 | 0 | - | | - | | - | | 12 | 0 |
| Harbin Yiteng | Total | | 50 | 0 | 0 | 0 | 0 | 0 | 0 | 0 | 50 | 0 |
| Shanghai Shenhua | 2010 | Chinese Super League | 1 | 0 | - | | - | | - | | 1 | 0 |
| Shanghai Shenhua | 2011 | Chinese Super League | 10 | 0 | 1 | 0 | 1 | 0 | - | | 12 | 0 |
| Shanghai Shenhua | 2012 | Chinese Super League | 16 | 1 | 1 | 0 | - | | - | | 17 | 1 |
| Shanghai Shenhua | Total | | 27 | 1 | 2 | 0 | 1 | 0 | 0 | 0 | 30 | 1 |
| Wuhan Zall | 2013 | Chinese Super League | 23 | 0 | 1 | 0 | - | | - | | 24 | 0 |
| Wuhan Zall | 2014 | China League One | 19 | 0 | 0 | 0 | - | | - | | 19 | 0 |
| Wuhan Zall | 2015 | China League One | 16 | 0 | 0 | 0 | - | | - | | 16 | 0 |
| Wuhan Zall | 2016 | China League One | 15 | 0 | 0 | 0 | - | | - | | 15 | 0 |
| Wuhan Zall | Total | | 73 | 0 | 1 | 0 | 0 | 0 | 0 | 0 | 74 | 0 |
| Tianjin Teda | 2017 | Chinese Super League | 13 | 1 | 0 | 0 | - | | - | | 13 | 1 |
| Tianjin Teda | 2018 | Chinese Super League | 7 | 0 | 2 | 0 | - | | - | | 9 | 0 |
| Tianjin Teda | 2019 | Chinese Super League | 1 | 0 | 3 | 0 | - | | - | | 4 | 0 |
| Tianjin Teda | 2020 | Chinese Super League | 6 | 0 | 4 | 1 | - | | - | | 10 | 1 |
| Tianjin Teda | 2021 | Chinese Super League | 2 | 0 | 0 | 0 | - | | - | | 2 | 0 |
| Tianjin Teda | 2022 | Chinese Super League | 0 | 0 | 1 | 0 | - | | - | | 1 | 0 |
| Tianjin Teda | Total | | 29 | 1 | 10 | 1 | 0 | 0 | 0 | 0 | 39 | 2 |
| Dandong Tengyue | 2023 | China League One | 22 | 0 | 1 | 0 | - | | - | | 23 | 0 |
| Shanghai Jiading Huilong | 2024 | China League One | 24 | 0 | 1 | 0 | - | | - | | 25 | 0 |
| Shanghai Jiading Huilong | 2025 | China League One | 0 | 0 | 0 | 0 | - | | - | | 0 | 0 |
| Shanghai Jiading Huilong | Total | | 24 | 0 | 1 | 0 | 0 | 0 | 0 | 0 | 25 | 0 |
| Career total | | | 225 | 2 | 15 | 1 | 1 | 0 | 0 | 0 | 241 | 3 |
