= Song Boxuan =

Chinese footballer

Song Boxuan 宋博轩
Personal information
- Full name: Song Boxuan
- Date of birth: 16 September 1989 (age 37)
- Place of birth: Tianjin, China
- Height: 1.76 m (5 ft 9 in)
- Position: Left winger

Youth career
- 2000–2007: Tianjin Locomotive

Senior career*
Years	Team	Apps	(Gls)
2008–2009	Tianjin Locomotive		
2010–2013	Shanghai Shenhua	74	(5)
2014–2017	Beijing Guoan	60	(2)
2018–2019	Tianjin Quanjian	6	(0)
2020–2021	Henan Songshan Longmen	9	(0)

International career^{‡}
2010–2012	China U-23		
2015	China	1	(0)
- * Club domestic league appearances and goals as of 31 December 2020 ‡ National team caps and goals as of 15 July 2017

Song Boxuan (simplified Chinese: 宋博轩; traditional Chinese: 宋博軒; pinyin: Sòng Bóxuān; born 16 September 1989) is a Chinese former footballer.

== Club career ==
Starting his football career at third-tier side Tianjin Locomotive, Song Boxuan was scouted by top-tier side Shanghai Shenhua which he eventually joined at the beginning of the 2010 league season with teammate Feng Renliang. He was immediately selected as the team's first-choice left winger by the then manager Miroslav Blažević and would make his debut on 23 March 2010 in a league game against Changsha Ginde which ended in a 2–0 defeat. Despite the defeat, Song would keep his place within the team and he gained considerable playing time throughout the season. Established as a vital member of the team, he would go on to score his first goal for the club on 24 October 2010 in a league game against Shaanxi Renhe in a 3–2 victory.

On 3 January 2014, Song transferred to fellow Chinese Super League side Beijing Guoan. He made his debut for the club on 7 April 2014 in a 2–0 win against Guangzhou R&F. He scored his first goal for the club on 11 April 2014 in a 2–1 win over Guizhou Renhe. He was plagued with injuries, missing 60 Super League matches of 120 from 2014 to 2017.

Song was linked with his hometown club Tianjin Teda after the 2017 season. On 26 February 2018, he transferred to Tianjin Teda's city rival Tianjin Quanjian in the Chinese Super League. He made his debut on 10 March 2018 in a 2–1 home loss to Beijing Renhe, coming on as a substitute for Wang Xiaolong in the 67th minute.

== International career ==
After an impressive start with Shanghai Shenhua, Song would be called up to the Chinese under-23 national team to take part in the 2010 Asian Games where he played in all three group games before seeing China get knocked out in the knockout stage. Song was called up for the Chinese national team in June 2015 for the 2018 FIFA World Cup qualification, replacing injury Yu Hai. He made his senior international debut on 16 June 2015 in a 6–0 away win against Bhutan, coming on for Gao Lin in the 70th minute.

== Career statistics ==
Statistics accurate as of match played 31 December 2020.

Appearances and goals by club, season and competition
Club	Season	League			National Cup		Continental		Other		Total	
Club	Season	Division	Apps	Goals	Apps	Goals	Apps	Goals	Apps	Goals	Apps	Goals
Tianjin Locomotive	2008	China League Two			-		-		-			
Tianjin Locomotive	2009	China League Two			-		-		-			
Tianjin Locomotive	Total				0	0	0	0	0	0		
Shanghai Shenhua	2010	Chinese Super League	25	1	-		-		-		25	1
Shanghai Shenhua	2011	Chinese Super League	7	0	0	0	1	0	-		8	0
Shanghai Shenhua	2012	Chinese Super League	17	3	0	0	-		-		17	3
Shanghai Shenhua	2013	Chinese Super League	25	1	1	0	-		-		26	1
Shanghai Shenhua	Total		74	5	1	0	1	0	0	0	76	5
Beijing Guoan	2014	Chinese Super League	13	1	0	0	4	0	-		17	1
Beijing Guoan	2015	Chinese Super League	16	0	0	0	8	1	-		24	1
Beijing Guoan	2016	Chinese Super League	10	0	3	0	-		-		13	0
Beijing Guoan	2017	Chinese Super League	21	1	2	0	-		-		23	1
Beijing Guoan	Total		60	2	5	0	12	1	0	0	77	3
Tianjin Quanjian	2018	Chinese Super League	1	0	0	0	0	0	-		1	0
Tianjin Quanjian	2019	Chinese Super League	5	0	2	0	-		-		7	0
Tianjin Quanjian	Total		6	0	2	0	0	0	0	0	8	0
Henan Jianye	2020	Chinese Super League	9	0	0	0	-		-		9	0
Career total			149	7	8	0	13	1	0	0	170	8
