= Feng Renliang =

Chinese footballer

Feng Renliang 冯仁亮
Personal information
- Full name: Feng Renliang
- Date of birth: 12 May 1988 (age 38)
- Place of birth: Tianjin, China
- Height: 1.78 m (5 ft 10 in)
- Position: Right winger

Youth career
- 2000–2008: Tianjin Huochetou

Senior career*
Years	Team	Apps	(Gls)
2008–2010	Tianjin Huochetou	17	(7)
2010–2012	Shanghai Shenhua	78	(10)
2013–2015	Guangzhou Evergrande	12	(1)
2014	→ Changchun Yatai (loan)	8	(0)
2015	→ Guizhou Renhe (loan)	25	(6)
2016–2019	Beijing Renhe	34	(4)

International career^{‡}
2010–2012	China	16	(1)
- * Club domestic league appearances and goals as of 10 December 2023 ‡ National team caps and goals as of 31 October 2015

Feng Renliang (Chinese: 冯仁亮; pinyin: Féng Rénliàng; Mandarin pronunciation: [fə̌ŋ ɻə̌n ljâŋ]; born 12 May 1988) is a Chinese former professional footballer.

== Club career ==
Feng Renliang started his football career playing for third-tier side Tianjin Huochetou in 2008 where he was considered a highly talented youngster. He was scouted by several Chinese clubs before joining top-tier side Shanghai Shenhua at the beginning of the 2010 league season with teammate Song Boxuan. Feng was immediately selected as the team's first-choice right winger by then manager Miroslav Blažević and he would make his debut on 23 March 2010 in a league game against Changsha Ginde in a 2-0 loss. Despite this loss, he kept his place within the team and would show his attacking abilities a few weeks later on 10 April 2010 when he scored his first goal for the club in a 2-1 win against Hangzhou Greentown.

On 20 November 2012, Chinese Super League side Guangzhou Evergrande officially announced they had signed Feng for an undisclosed fee. He made his debut for the club on 8 March 2013 in a 5-1 win against Shanghai Shenxin. He scored his first goal for the club in a 3-0 win against Henan Jianye on 8 March 2014. On 16 June 2014, Feng joined Changchun Yatai on loan for the rest of the 2014 season. He made his debut for the club on 20 July 2014 in a 3-2 loss against Hangzhou Greentown. On 28 February 2015, Feng was loaned out to Guizhou Renhe for the 2015 season. He made his debut for the club on 7 March 2015 in a 1-0 loss against Liaoning Whowin.

In November 2015, Feng transferred to China League One side Beijing Renhe.

== International career ==
Feng was called up to the Chinese national team and make his debut in a 1-1 draw against Bahrain on 11 August 2010. After several further friendlies, Feng was called up to the preliminary squad for the 2011 AFC Asian Cup and while he wasn't guaranteed a spot within the team he was expected to play for the Chinese under-23 national team in their qualification campaign for the 2012 Summer Olympics, however it was discovered during this period that Feng had lied about his age and instead of being born 8 January 1989 he was actually born 12 May 1988. On 24 December 2010, the Chinese Football Association would fine Tianjin Locomotive and Shanghai Shenhua for their knowledge of this and banned Feng for three games, which essentially meant he would be dropped for the 2011 AFC Asian Cup. Feng scored his first goal for the national team on 8 June 2012 in a 3-0 win against Vietnam.

== Career statistics ==
=== Club statistics ===
As of 31 December 2019.

Appearances and goals by club, season and competition
Club	Season	League			National Cup		Continental		Other		Total	
Club	Season	Division	Apps	Goals	Apps	Goals	Apps	Goals	Apps	Goals	Apps	Goals
Tianjin Huochetou	2008	China League Two	17	7	-		-		-		17	7
Tianjin Huochetou	2009	China League Two	0	0	-		-		-		0	0
Tianjin Huochetou	Total		17	7	0	0	0	0	0	0	17	7
Shanghai Shenhua	2010	Chinese Super League	29	5	-		-		-		29	5
Shanghai Shenhua	2011	Chinese Super League	24	1	2	0	6	0	-		32	1
Shanghai Shenhua	2012	Chinese Super League	23	4	1	0	-		-		24	3
Shanghai Shenhua	Total		76	10	3	0	6	0	0	0	85	10
Guangzhou Evergrande	2013	Chinese Super League	10	0	0	0	1	0	1 (Note: Appearances in Chinese FA Super Cup)	0	12	0
Guangzhou Evergrande	2014	Chinese Super League	2	1	0	0	1	0	0	0	3	1
Guangzhou Evergrande	Total		12	1	0	0	2	0	1	0	15	1
Changchun Yatai (loan)	2014	Chinese Super League	8	0	0	0	-		-		8	0
Guizhou Renhe (loan)	2015	Chinese Super League	25	6	1	1	-		-		26	7
Beijing Renhe	2016	China League One	20	4	2	0	-		-		22	4
Beijing Renhe	2017	China League One	6	0	1	0	-		-		7	0
Beijing Renhe	2018	Chinese Super League	0	0	0	0	-		-		0	0
Beijing Renhe	2019	Chinese Super League	8	0	1	0	-		-		9	0
Beijing Renhe	Total		34	4	4	0	0	0	0	0	38	4
Career total			172	28	8	1	8	0	1	0	189	29

=== International goals ===
Results list China's goal tally first.

#	Date	Venue	Opponent	Score	Result	Competition
1	8 June 2012	Wuhan, China	Vietnam	2–0	3–0	Friendly international

== Honours ==
=== Club ===
Guangzhou Evergrande

- Chinese Super League: 2013
- AFC Champions League: 2013
