= List of Chinese football transfers winter 2011 =

This is a list of Chinese football transfers for the 2011 season winter transfer window. Only moves from Super League and League One are listed. The transfer window was opened from 30 December 2010 to 21 March 2011.

== Super League ==
=== Beijing Guoan ===
In: Note: Flags indicate national team as defined under FIFA eligibility rules; some limited exceptions apply. Players may hold more than one non-FIFA nationality.

| No. | Pos. | Nation | Player |
|---|---|---|---|
| 3 | DF | CHN | Yu Yang (loan return from Dalian Aerbin) |
| 8 | FW | BRA | Roberto (from (Greece) Asteras Tripolis) |
| 10 | FW | BRA | Davi (loan from (Qatar) Umm Salal) |
| 39 | MF | CHN | Piao Cheng (from Yanbian Baekdu Tigers) |

Out: Note: Flags indicate national team as defined under FIFA eligibility rules; some limited exceptions apply. Players may hold more than one non-FIFA nationality.

| No. | Pos. | Nation | Player |
|---|---|---|---|
| 3 | DF | CHN | Wu Hao (Released) |
| 8 | MF | CHN | Yang Hao (to Guangzhou Evergrande) |
| 9 | FW | CHN | Du Wenhui (to Jiangsu Sainty) |
| 16 | MF | CHN | Huang Bowen (to (South Korea) Jeonbuk Hyundai Motors) |
| 17 | MF | CHN | Wang Ke (Released) |
| 21 | MF | CHN | Yao Shuang (loan to Beijing Baxy) |
| 23 | FW | AUS | Ryan Griffiths (to (Australia) Newcastle United Jets) |
| 25 | MF | CHN | Xue Fei (loan to Beijing Baxy) |
| 33 | DF | SCO | Maurice Ross (to (Scotland) Motherwell F.C.) |
| - | MF | CHN | Sang Yifei (to Hubei Zhongbo) |
| - | MF | CHN | Zou Yucheng (to Chongqing F.C.) |
| - | MF | CHN | Li Lei (to Beijing Baxy) |
| - | MF | CHN | Wang Wenan (to Beijing Baxy) |
| - | MF | CHN | Wen Bo (to Beijing Baxy) |
| - | MF | CHN | Wang Qiancheng (to Beijing Baxy) |
| - | MF | CHN | Tang Miao (to Shenzhen Phoenix) |
| - | MF | CHN | Luo Xi (to Shenzhen Ruby) |
| - | DF | CHN | Cao Bin (to Henan Construction) |
| - | DF | CHN | Yu Tianzhu (to Guizhou Zhicheng) |
| - | GK | CHN | Su Boyang (to Guizhou Zhicheng) |

=== Changchun Yatai ===
In:

| No. | Pos. | Nation | Player |
|---|---|---|---|
| 4 | DF | UZB | Anzur Ismailov (from (Uzbekistan) FC Bunyodkor) |
| 5 | MF | SRB | Radomir Koković (loan from (Serbia) FK Rad) |
| 10 | FW | BRA | Dori (loan from (Brazil) Fluminense) |
| 18 | MF | CHN | Qu Xiaohui (from Dalian Yiteng) |
| 20 | MF | CHN | Piao Qianhua (from Liaoning Whowin) |
| 26 | MF | CHN | Li Mou (from Liaoning Whowin) |
| 38 | FW | CHN | Men Yang (from Chengdu Blades) |
| - | DF | CHN | Tang Jing (loan return from Jiangsu Sainty) |
| - | DF | CHN | Ai Zhibo (loan return from Jiangsu Sainty) |
| - | DF | BRA | Welton Felipe (loan from (Brazil) Atlético Mineiro) |
| - | MF | BRA | Sávio (loan from (Serbia) Red Star Belgrade) |
| - | FW | CHN | Huang Jie (loan return from Shanghai Zobon) |
| - | FW | CRC | Johnny Woodly Lambert (loan return from Chongqing Lifan) |

Out:

| No. | Pos. | Nation | Player |
|---|---|---|---|
| 3 | DF | CHN | Tang Jing (to Jiangsu Sainty) |
| 4 | DF | HON | Samuel Caballero (Released) |
| 5 | DF | KOR | Lee Se-In (Released) |
| 9 | FW | CRC | Johnny Woodly Lambert (to Dalian Aerbin) |
| 10 | FW | COL | Ricardo Steer (to Guangdong Sunray Cave) |
| 12 | DF | CHN | Ai Zhibo (to Jiangsu Sainty) |
| 14 | FW | CHN | Cao Tianbao (loan to Shenzhen Phoenix) |
| 15 | MF | CHN | Yang Haibo (Retired) |
| 16 | MF | CHN | Su Yang (Released) |
| 18 | GK | CHN | An Qi (Released) |
| 19 | MF | ARG | Sebastián Setti (to (Ukraine) Chornomorets Odesa) |
| 20 | DF | CHN | Zhang Baofeng (Released) |
| 22 | FW | CHN | Wang Rui (to Fujian Smart Hero) |
| 26 | MF | CHN | Wen Chenghua (Released) |
| 27 | DF | CHN | Wang Bo (to Liaoning Whowin) |
| 31 | FW | CHN | Yao Bo (to Dalian Shide) |
| 41 | DF | SRB | Miloš Mihajlov (to (Kazakhstan) Zhetysu) |
| - | FW | CHN | Huang Jie (loan to Hubei Wuhan Zhongbo) |
| - | MF | CHN | Li Qi (to Dalian Aerbin) |
| - | DF | BRA | Welton Felipe (loan return to (Brazil) Atlético Mineiro) |
| - | MF | BRA | Sávio (loan return to (Serbia) Red Star Belgrade) |

=== Chengdu Blades ===
In:

| No. | Pos. | Nation | Player |
|---|---|---|---|
| 5 | MF | AUS | Jonas Salley (from Shaanxi Chan-Ba) |
| 14 | DF | CHN | Hu Wei (loan from Chongqing Lifan) |
| 19 | FW | AUS | Adam Kwasnik (loan from (Australia) Central Coast Mariners) |
| 21 | MF | CHN | Zhang Li (loan from Chongqing Lifan) |
| 26 | MF | CHN | Wang Kai (loan from Chongqing Lifan) |
| 36 | DF | CHN | Liu Jialin (loan from Chongqing Lifan) |
| - | MF | ARG | Bruno Óscar Casanova (from (Ecuador) Deportivo Cuenca) |
| - | MF | CHN | Wu Bo (loan return from Tianjin Songjiang) |
| - | DF | CHN | Yu Rui (loan return from Tianjin Songjiang) |

Out:

| No. | Pos. | Nation | Player |
|---|---|---|---|
| 5 | MF | CHN | Sui Donglu (to Shenzhen Phoenix) |
| 10 | MF | CHN | Xiao Zhanbo (Released) |
| 14 | MF | BRA | Harison (to Shenzhen Phoenix) |
| 18 | MF | CHN | Yao Xia (Retired) |
| 19 | MF | CHN | Jiang Xiaoyu (Released) |
| 20 | MF | CHN | Zou Yougen (Retired) |
| 21 | FW | BRA | Tiago Honório (loan return to Shenzhen Ruby) |
| 26 | MF | CHN | Xia Qixi (Released) |
| 38 | FW | ANG | Johnson Macaba (loan return to (Brazil) Goiás) |
| - | MF | CHN | Wu Bo (to Tianjin Songjiang) |
| - | DF | CHN | Yu Rui (to Tianjin Songjiang) |
| - | FW | CHN | Men Yang (to Changchun Yatai) |

=== Dalian Shide ===
In:

| No. | Pos. | Nation | Player |
|---|---|---|---|
| 10 | MF | CHN | Yan Song (from (South Korea) Jeju United) |
| 12 | MF | CHN | Han Jiabao (from Dalian Yiteng) |
| 16 | MF | KOR | Jeon Kwang-Jin (from (South Korea) Seongnam Ilhwa) |
| 20 | DF | KOR | Kim Jin-Kyu (from (South Korea) FC Seoul) |
| 28 | MF | CHN | Wang Yun (from Shaanxi Chanba) |
| 36 | FW | CHN | Yao Bo (tfrom Changchun Yatai) |
| - | MF | CHN | Hu Zhaojun (loan return from Guangzhou Evergrande) |
| - | GK | CHN | Guo Wei (loan return from Beijing Baxy) |
| - | FW | CHN | Li Kai (loan return from Shaanxi Chanba) |

Out:

| No. | Pos. | Nation | Player |
|---|---|---|---|
| 10 | FW | SRB | Borko Veselinović (to (Serbia) OFK Beograd) |
| 12 | DF | CHN | Du Longquan (Released) |
| 20 | MF | CHN | Zhang Depeng (to Fujian Smart Hero) |
| 28 | MF | CHN | Chi Jinyu (to Fujian Smart Hero) |
| 30 | DF | CHN | Lu Qiang (Released) |
| 32 | FW | CHN | Sheng Jun (to Chongqing F.C.) |
| 33 | MF | BRA | Márcio Senna (Released) |
| 35 | GK | CHN | Wang Guoming (loan to Fujian Smart Hero) |
| - | MF | CHN | Hu Zhaojun (to Guangzhou Evergrande) |
| - | GK | CHN | Guo Wei (loan to Chongqing F.C.) |
| - | FW | CHN | Li Kai (to Shaanxi Chanba) |

=== Guangzhou Evergrande ===
In:

| No. | Pos. | Nation | Player |
|---|---|---|---|
| 1 | GK | CHN | Yang Jun (from Tianjin Teda) |
| 3 | DF | BRA | Paulão (from (Brazil) Grêmio Prudente) |
| 5 | DF | CHN | Zhang Linpeng (from Shanghai East Asia) |
| 6 | DF | CHN | Feng Xiaoting (from (South Korea) Jeonbuk Hyundai Motors) |
| 8 | MF | BRA | Renato Cajá (from (Brazil) Botafogo) |
| 9 | FW | BRA | Cléo (from (Serbia) FK Partizan) |
| 16 | MF | KOR | Cho Won-Hee (from (England) Wigan Athletic) |
| 19 | MF | CHN | Yang Hao (from Beijing Guoan) |
| 21 | FW | CHN | Jiang Ning (from Qingdao Jonoon) |
| 27 | FW | CHN | Ye Weichao (loan return from Guangdong Sunray Cave) |
| 34 | FW | CHN | Huang Jiaqiang (loan return from Guangdong Sunray Cave) |
| 35 | DF | CHN | Zhang Tianlong (from Shandong Luneng) |
| - | FW | CHN | Wei Jingxing (from Guangzhou Yida) |

Out:

| No. | Pos. | Nation | Player |
|---|---|---|---|
| 2 | DF | CHN | Li Zhihai (to Guangdong Sunray Cave) |
| 5 | DF | CHN | Dai Xianrong (Retired) |
| 6 | MF | CHN | Hu Zhaojun (to Dalian Aerbin) |
| 8 | MF | BRA | Eduardo Delani (Released) |
| 9 | FW | CAN | Charles Gbeke (Released) |
| 10 | MF | NGA | Gabriel Melkam (to Qingdao Jonoon) |
| 15 | MF | CHN | Xu Weilong (Released) |
| 16 | MF | CHN | Xu Deen (to Hunan Billows) |
| 17 | MF | CHN | Cai Yaohui (Retired) |
| 30 | MF | CHN | Lu Lin (to Guangdong Sunray Cave) |
| 33 | DF | CHN | Huang Zhiyi (to (Macau) Hoi Fan) |
| 34 | DF | CHN | Wang Xiaoshi (to Hubei Wuhan Zhongbo) |
| - | MF | CHN | Zhong Peihao (to Guangdong Sunray Cave) |
| - | MF | CHN | Shi Tingliang (loan to (Macau) G.D. Artilheiros) |
| - | FW | CHN | Li Jiaqi (loan to (Macau) G.D. Artilheiros) |
| - | MF | CHN | Li Bin (loan to (Macau) G.D. Artilheiros) |
| - | FW | CHN | Zhu Pengfei (loan to (Macau) Lam Ieng) |

=== Hangzhou Greentown ===
In:

| No. | Pos. | Nation | Player |
|---|---|---|---|
| 10 | FW | URU | Matías Masiero (loan from (Chile) Unión Española) |
| 11 | MF | URU | Paulo Pezzolano (from (Uruguay) Liverpool Fútbol Club) |
| 12 | MF | CHN | Shen Longyuan (from Shanghai Shenhua) |
| 18 | MF | CHN | Zheng Kewei (from Nanchang Hengyuan) |
| 21 | MF | URU | Sebastián Vázquez (loan from (Uruguay) Danubio) |
| 23 | GK | CHN | Gu Chao (from Shanghai East Asia) |
| 25 | DF | CHN | Jiao Zhe (from Shandong Luneng) |
| - | DF | CHN | Cai Shun (from Shandong Luneng) |

Out:

| No. | Pos. | Nation | Player |
|---|---|---|---|
| 3 | DF | HKG | Ng Wai Chiu (to (Hong Kong) South China) |
| 4 | MF | CHN | Yang Ke (Released) |
| 10 | FW | HON | Jerry Palacios (to Hunan Billows) |
| 12 | MF | CHN | Cai Chuchuan (to Liaoning Whowin) |
| 21 | DF | CHN | Ouyang Xue (to Chongqing F.C.) |
| 23 | DF | HON | Mauricio Sabillón (loan return to (Honduras) Marathón) |
| 24 | DF | CHN | Song Chaoran (to Chongqing F.C.) |
| 25 | DF | CHN | Zhong Peiwei (to Chongqing F.C.) |
| 27 | DF | CHN | Wang Hongyou (to Dalian Aerbin) |
| 31 | DF | CHN | Yao Zhen (to Tianjin Songjiang) |
| 36 | MF | HON | Emil Martínez (to (Honduras) Marathón) |
| - | DF | CHN | Cai Shun (on loan to Hubei Wuhan Zhongbo) |
| - | MF | CHN | Gui Zheng (to Chongqing F.C.) |
| - | DF | CHN | Lin Longchang (to Guizhou Zhicheng) |
| - | GK | CHN | Niu Ben (to Chongqing F.C.) |
| - | MF | CHN | Song Zhiwei (to Chongqing F.C.) |

=== Henan Construction ===
In:

| No. | Pos. | Nation | Player |
|---|---|---|---|
| 2 | DF | BRA | Fabão (from (Brazil) Guarani) |
| 8 | MF | BRA | Thiago Potiguar (loan from (Brazil) Paysandu) |
| 14 | MF | CHN | Huang Xiyang (from Chongqing Lifan) |
| 20 | FW | KOR | Lee Joon-Yeop (from (South Korea) Myongji University) |
| 21 | FW | CHN | Ling Sihao (from Shandong Luneng) |
| 22 | MF | BRA | Rômulo (from (South Korea) Busan I'Park) |
| 35 | DF | CHN | Cao Bin (from Beijing Guoan) |
| - | MF | CHN | Zi Long (loan return from Hunan Billows) |

Out:

| No. | Pos. | Nation | Player |
|---|---|---|---|
| 2 | MF | KOR | Song Tae-Lim (Released) |
| 5 | FW | POL | Emmanuel Olisadebe (Released) |
| 6 | MF | CHN | Zou You (Released) |
| 16 | MF | CHN | Zhang Miao (Released) |
| 17 | MF | CHN | Yang Shilin (to Hubei Wuhan Zhongbo) |
| 20 | MF | CHN | You Yuanwen (Released) |
| 21 | GK | CHN | Dang Zhao (Released) |
| 23 | MF | NGA | Obi Moneke (Released) |
| 24 | DF | CHN | Zhang Junqiang (Released) |
| 25 | MF | CHN | Mirakhmadjon Muzaffar (loan return to Shandong Luneng) |
| - | MF | CHN | Bai Fan (to Tianjin Runyulong) |
| - | MF | CHN | Zhao Yang (to Guizhou Zhicheng) |
| - | MF | CHN | Zi Long (Released) |

=== Jiangsu Sainty ===
In:

| No. | Pos. | Nation | Player |
|---|---|---|---|
| 4 | DF | AUS | Alex Wilkinson (loan from (Australia) Central Coast Mariners) |
| 8 | MF | CHN | Liu Jianye (from Shenzhen Phoenix) |
| 10 | FW | ROU | Cristian Dănălache (from (Israel) Bnei Sakhnin) |
| 11 | FW | CHN | Du Wenhui (from Beijing Guoan) |
| 12 | DF | CHN | Ai Zhibo (from Changchun Yatai) |
| 19 | FW | AUS | Bruce Djite (loan from (Australia) Adelaide United FC) |
| 21 | MF | PER | Paolo de la Haza (from (Peru) Alianza Lima) |
| 23 | DF | CHN | Ren Hang (from Shenzhen Phoenix) |
| 27 | DF | CHN | Wang Guanyu (from Shenzhen Phoenix) |
| 30 | DF | CHN | Tang Jing (from Changchun Yatai) |
| - | DF | CHN | Wang Jie (loan return from Beijing Technology) |

Out:

| No. | Pos. | Nation | Player |
|---|---|---|---|
| 8 | MF | BRA | Geninho (Released) |
| 11 | FW | CHN | Wang Yang (to Chongqing F.C.) |
| 14 | DF | CHN | Wang Xiang (loan to Chongqing F.C.) |
| 19 | DF | CHN | Wang Jie (Released) |
| 20 | DF | CHN | Wang Weilong (to Nanchang Hengyuan) |
| 21 | DF | CHN | Liu Tao (to Tianjin Songjiang) |
| 23 | MF | CHN | Di You (to Chongqing F.C.) |
| 24 | FW | CHN | Zhi Yaqi (to Chongqing F.C.) |
| 25 | MF | CHN | Hu Zhuowei (loan return to Hubei Wuhan Zhongbo) |
| 27 | MF | CHN | Zhang Ke (Released) |
| 33 | DF | KOR | Park Jae-hong (to (South Korea) Gyeongnam FC) |
| 37 | MF | CHN | Qin Sheng (to Liaoning Whowin) |
| 38 | DF | CHN | Tang Jing (loan return to Changchun Yatai) |
| 39 | DF | CHN | Ai Zhibo (loan return to Changchun Yatai) |
| 41 | FW | NGA | Victor Agali (Released) |
| 42 | FW | SLE | Aluspah Brewah (to Tianjin Songjiang) |

=== Liaoning Whowin ===
In:

| No. | Pos. | Nation | Player |
|---|---|---|---|
| 10 | FW | BRA | Valdo (from (Japan) Shonan Bellmare) |
| 11 | DF | CHN | Zheng Tao (from Shaanxi Chanba) |
| 26 | MF | CHN | Qin Sheng (from Jiangsu Sainty) |
| 27 | DF | CHN | Wang Bo (from Changchun Yatai) |
| 31 | FW | CHN | Ji Chao (from Shenzhen Ruby) |
| 32 | MF | SRB | Vladimir Bogdanović (from (Serbia) Red Star Belgrade) |
| 35 | DF | AUS | Dean Heffernan (loan from (Australia) Perth Glory) |
| 39 | FW | CHN | Ma Shuai (from (Japan) Unsommet Iwate Hachimantai) |
| 40 | DF | KOR | Kim Yoo-Jin (from (Japan) Yokohama F.C.) |
| - | MF | CHN | Cai Chuchuan (from Hangzhou Greentown) |

Out:

| No. | Pos. | Nation | Player |
|---|---|---|---|
| 8 | MF | CHN | Zhang Haifeng (Retired) |
| 11 | MF | CHN | Piao Qianhua (to Changchun Yatai) |
| 13 | FW | CHN | Xiao Zhen (to Chongqing F.C.) |
| 14 | MF | CHN | Du Yu (to Chongqing F.C.) |
| 15 | DF | CHN | Liang Liang (Released) |
| 19 | DF | CHN | Hu Xiaoyu (to Chongqing F.C.) |
| 23 | MF | CHN | Li Mou (to Changchun Yatai) |
| 25 | DF | CHN | Sun Weigang (Released) |
| 27 | MF | BRA | Andrezinho (to (Japan) Consadole Sapporo) |
| 28 | DF | AUS | Chris Coyne (loan return to (Australia) Perth Glory) |
| 35 | MF | MLI | Boubacar Diarra (Released) |
| 37 | FW | BRA | Gilcimar (to (Brazil) Duque de Caxias) |
| 39 | DF | UZB | Islom Inomov (to (Uzbekistan) FC Bunyodkor) |

=== Nanchang Hengyuan ===
In:

| No. | Pos. | Nation | Player |
|---|---|---|---|
| 10 | FW | URU | Jonathan Ramis (loan from (Uruguay) Peñarol) |
| 13 | DF | KOR | Ko Jae-Sung (from (South Korea) Seongnam Ilhwa) |
| 16 | MF | CHN | Wang Jiayu (from Shanghai East Asia) |
| 11 | MF | CHN | Jiang Zhipeng (from Shanghai East Asia) |
| 23 | FW | URU | Diego Vera (loan from (Uruguay) Liverpool Montevideo) |
| 24 | DF | CHN | Wang Weilong (from Jiangsu Sainty) |
| 25 | GK | CHN | Liu Dianzuo (from Dalian Yiteng) |
| - | FW | BRA | Tozin (loan from (Brazil) Corinthians Alagoano) |

Out:

| No. | Pos. | Nation | Player |
|---|---|---|---|
| 4 | DF | CHN | Yang Yun (loan return to Shanghai Shenhua) |
| 7 | MF | CHN | Zhang Lifeng (to Guizhou Zhicheng) |
| 9 | FW | BRA | Beto (to Shenzhen Phoenix) |
| 18 | MF | CHN | Zheng Kewei (to Hangzhou Greentown) |
| 21 | GK | CHN | Lin Yao (Released) |
| 24 | DF | CHN | Zhou Xing (Released) |
| 29 | DF | CHN | Liu Junwei (Released) |
| 41 | MF | UZB | Asqar Jadigerov (to (Uzbekistan) FC Bunyodkor) |
| 43 | FW | BRA | Alexsandro (to (Brazil) Murici Futebol Clube) |
| - | FW | BRA | Tozin (loan return to (Brazil) Corinthians Alagoano) |

=== Qingdao Jonoon ===
In:

| No. | Pos. | Nation | Player |
|---|---|---|---|
| 3 | DF | BRA | Léo San (from (Brazil) Avaí) |
| 4 | MF | NGA | Gabriel Melkam (from Guangzhou Evergrande) |
| 9 | FW | BRA | Éber Luís (from (Brazil) Veranópolis) |
| 11 | MF | UZB | Ildar Magdeev (from (Uzbekistan) Pakhtakor Tashkent) |
| 21 | GK | CHN | Mou Pengfei (from Shaanxi Baorong Chanba) |

Out:

| No. | Pos. | Nation | Player |
|---|---|---|---|
| 21 | FW | CHN | Jiang Ning (to Guangzhou Evergrande) |
| 27 | FW | SVN | Aleksander Rodić (loan return to (Slovenia) Interblock Ljubljana) |
| 33 | MF | CRO | Stjepan Jukić (to Chongqing Lifan) |
| 37 | DF | KOR | Lee Yoon-Sub (Released) |
| 39 | DF | CHN | Yang Kunpeng (Released) |
| 40 | DF | BIH | Ninoslav Milenković (to (Croatia) NK Istra 1961) |

=== Shaanxi Baorong Chanba ===
In:

| No. | Pos. | Nation | Player |
|---|---|---|---|
| 3 | DF | CHN | Zhang Chenglin (from Shenzhen Phoenix) |
| 4 | MF | ITA | Fabio Firmani (from (Italy) Lazio) |
| 6 | DF | AUS | Dino Djulbic (from (Australia) Gold Coast United) |
| 8 | MF | CHN | Li Chunyu (from (South Korea) Gangwon FC) |
| 9 | FW | SVK | Tomáš Oravec (loan from (Slovakia) MŠK Žilina) |
| 10 | FW | BRA | Wilson (from (Brazil) Sport Recife) |
| 12 | GK | CHN | Zhang Lie (from Shenyang Dongjin) |
| 13 | MF | CHN | Wang Erzhuo (loan return from Shenzhen Ruby) |
| 16 | FW | CHN | Zhang Chengxiang (from Shenzhen Phoenix) |
| 25 | FW | CHN | Li Kai (from Dalian Shide) |
| - | MF | CHN | Zhang Yong (loan return from Tianjin Songjiang) |

Out:

| No. | Pos. | Nation | Player |
|---|---|---|---|
| 4 | MF | AUS | Jonas Salley (to Chengdu Blades) |
| 6 | MF | CHN | Zheng Wei (to Shanghai Shenhua) |
| 10 | FW | SLE | Mohamed Kallon (Retired) |
| 11 | FW | FRA | Cédric Sabin (to (France) FC Red Star Saint-Ouen) |
| 12 | FW | CHN | Chen Zijie (loan to Shanghai East Asia) |
| 16 | MF | CHN | Cao Huan (to Hunan Billows) |
| 18 | DF | CHN | Zheng Tao (to Liaoning Whowin) |
| 20 | MF | CHN | Wang Yun (to Dalian Shide) |
| 22 | GK | CHN | Wu Yansheng (Released) |
| 23 | DF | CHN | Yu Cengnan (to Tianjin Songjiang) |
| 25 | FW | CHN | Li Kai (loan return to Dalian Shide) |
| 28 | DF | CHN | Xin Feng (to Shanghai Shenhua) |
| 29 | DF | CHN | Liu Tianqi (loan to Dalian Aerbin) |
| 32 | MF | CHN | Zhang Yong (to Tianjin Songjiang) |
| 34 | MF | CHN | Du Fa (to Chongqing F.C.) |
| 35 | MF | CHN | Wang Yuxing (Released) |
| 39 | FW | CRO | Ivan Brečević (to (Croatia) HNK Šibenik) |
| 40 | GK | CHN | Mou Pengfei (to Qingdao Jonoon) |
| 41 | MF | CHN | Liu Qisheng (Released) |

=== Shandong Luneng ===
In:

| No. | Pos. | Nation | Player |
|---|---|---|---|
| 3 | DF | BRA | Renato Silva (from (Brazil) São Paulo) |
| 5 | DF | CHN | Wang Qiang (from Shenzhen Phoenix) |
| 10 | FW | BRA | Obina (from (Brazil) Atlético Mineiro) |
| 14 | MF | CHN | Mirakhmadjon Muzaffar (loan return from Henan Construction) |
| 29 | DF | CPV | Ricardo (from (Portugal) Vitória S.C.) |

Out:

| No. | Pos. | Nation | Player |
|---|---|---|---|
| 3 | DF | BRA | Carlos Santos (loan return to (Croatia) Dinamo Zagreb) |
| 5 | DF | CHN | Shu Chang (Retired) |
| 17 | MF | CHN | Wan Cheng (to Chongqing F.C.) |
| 25 | DF | CHN | Jiao Zhe (to Hangzhou Greentown) |
| 29 | FW | CHN | Li Jinyu (Retired) |
| 32 | DF | CHN | Zhang Xiaoyu (Released) |
| 35 | DF | MLI | Mourtala Diakité (Released) |
| 36 | FW | FRA | Michaël Murcy (to (France) US Quevilly) |
| - | DF | CHN | Cai Shun (to Hangzhou Greentown) |
| - | DF | CHN | Zhang Tianlong (to Guangzhou Evergrande) |
| - | DF | CHN | Liu Shangkun (to Tianjin Songjiang) |
| - | FW | CHN | Xue Chen (to Tianjin Songjiang) |
| - | MF | CHN | Wang xiao (to Shenzhen Ruby) |
| - | FW | CHN | Ling Sihao (to Henan Construction) |

=== Shanghai Shenhua ===
In:

| No. | Pos. | Nation | Player |
|---|---|---|---|
| 3 | DF | CHN | Xin Feng (from Shaanxi Baorong Chanba) |
| 4 | DF | CHN | Wang Lin (loan return from Shanghai Zobon) |
| 8 | FW | COL | Duvier Riascos (loan extend from (Colombia) Once Caldas) |
| 9 | FW | ARG | Luis Salmerón (from (Argentina) Independiente Rivadavia) |
| 14 | DF | COL | Juan Camilo Angulo (loan from (Argentina) Tigre) |
| 16 | MF | CHN | Wen Huyi (from Shenzhen Phoenix) |
| 21 | MF | ARG | Facundo Pérez Castro (from (Greece) Olympiacos Volos) |
| 28 | MF | CHN | Cao Yunding (from Shanghai East Asia) |
| 31 | DF | SYR | Abdulkader Dakka (loan from (Syria) Al-Ittihad) |
| 36 | MF | CHN | Zheng Wei (from Shaanxi Baorong Chanba) |
| — | GK | CHN | Zhang Chen (loan return from Shanghai Zobon) |
| — | DF | CHN | Cheng Liang (loan return from Shenzhen Ruby) |
| — | DF | CHN | Yang Yun (loan return from Nanchang Hengyuan) |
| — | MF | CHN | Chen Tao (loan return from Tianjin Teda) |
| — | MF | CHN | Wang Qiang (loan return from Pudong Zobon) |
| — | FW | BLR | Vyacheslav Hleb (loan return from Shenzhen Ruby) |

Out:

| No. | Pos. | Nation | Player |
|---|---|---|---|
| 2 | DF | CHN | Chen Lei (to Shenzhen Ruby) |
| 9 | FW | CMR | Jean Michel N'Lend (Released) |
| 10 | MF | CHN | Chen Tao (to Tianjin Teda) |
| 14 | FW | BRA | Vicente (to Hubei Wuhan Zhongbo) |
| 15 | MF | CHN | Shen Longyuan (to Hangzhou Greentown) |
| 16 | MF | CHN | Wang Hongliang (to Shenzhen Ruby) |
| 17 | DF | CHN | Chen Yongqiang (to Tianjin Runyulong) |
| 26 | MF | CHN | Fan Qunxiao (Released) |
| 27 | DF | CHN | Tang Jiaqi (to Shanghai East Asia) |
| 33 | DF | ARG | Matías Villavicencio (to (Argentina) Ferro Carril Oeste) |
| 35 | DF | SYR | Ali Diab (loan return to (Syria) Al-Majd) |
| — | GK | CHN | Zhang Chen (to Shenyang Dongjin) |
| — | DF | CHN | Yang Yun (to Chongqing Lifan) |
| — | DF | CHN | Yang Huikang (to Hunan Billows) |
| — | MF | CHN | Wang Qiang (to Tianjin Songjiang) |
| — | FW | BLR | Vyacheslav Hleb (to (Belarus) Dinamo Minsk) |

=== Shenzhen Ruby ===
In:

| No. | Pos. | Nation | Player |
|---|---|---|---|
| 4 | MF | SVN | Janez Zavrl (from (Slovenia) ND Triglav Kranj) |
| 6 | DF | CHN | Luo Xi (from Beijing Guoan) |
| 10 | MF | SVN | Ermin Rakovič (from (Slovenia) FC Ljubljana) |
| 11 | MF | CHN | Liu Chao (from (Lithuania) FK Sūduva) |
| 15 | MF | JPN | Takashi Rakuyama (Free Agent) |
| 17 | FW | CHN | Dilmurat Batur (Free Agent) |
| 18 | FW | JPN | Seiichiro Maki (Free Agent) |
| 20 | MF | CHN | Abduwali Ablet (from Liaoning Tiger) |
| 21 | DF | CHN | Chen Lei (from Shanghai Shenhua) |
| 24 | FW | CHN | Wang Xiao (from Shandong Luneng) |
| 30 | MF | CHN | Yehya Ablikim (from Liaoning Tiger) |
| — | MF | CHN | Wang Hongliang (from Shanghai Shenhua) |
| — | FW | COL | Jair Reynoso (loan from (Bolivia) Club Aurora) |
| — | FW | BRA | Tiago Honório (loan return from Chengdu Blades) |
| — | MF | CHN | Li Haoyuan (loan return from (Indonesia) Persiwa Wamena) |

Out:

| No. | Pos. | Nation | Player |
|---|---|---|---|
| 5 | DF | IRQ | Hussein Alaa Hussein (to (Iraq) Zaxo FC) |
| 7 | MF | SRB | Aleksandar Živković (to Shenzhen Phoenix) |
| 10 | FW | BLR | Vyacheslav Hleb (loan return to Shanghai Shenhua) |
| 11 | FW | CHN | Pi siwei (Released) |
| 13 | MF | CHN | Li Lingwei (to Shenzhen Phoenix) |
| 17 | MF | CHN | Quan Heng (to Dalian Aerbin) |
| 19 | MF | CHN | Li Haoyuan (Released) |
| 21 | FW | CHN | Ji Chao (to Liaoning Whowin) |
| 24 | MF | CHN | Yi Xiaolong (to Fujian Smart Hero) |
| 28 | MF | CHN | Huang Long (to Shenzhen Phoenix) |
| 30 | MF | CHN | Wang Qingfeng (to Shenyang Dongjin) |
| 35 | MF | CHN | Wang Erzhuo (loan return to Shaanxi Chanba) |
| 36 | DF | CHN | Cheng Liang (loan return to Shanghai Shenhua) |
| 37 | DF | NZL | Ivan Vicelich (loan return to (New Zealand) Auckland City) |
| — | MF | CHN | Wang Hongliang (Released) |
| — | FW | COL | Jair Reynoso (loan return to (Bolivia) Club Aurora) |
| — | FW | BRA | Tiago Honório (to (Japan) Fagiano Okayama) |

=== Tianjin Teda ===
In:

| No. | Pos. | Nation | Player |
|---|---|---|---|
| 3 | MF | KOR | Kwon Jip (from (South Korea) Daejeon Citizen) |
| 5 | DF | CHN | Li Weifeng (from (South Korea) Suwon Samsung Bluewings) |
| 9 | FW | NGA | Obiora Odita (from (Serbia) Javor Ivanjica) |
| 12 | GK | CHN | Tian Xu (from Chongqing Lifan) |
| 36 | MF | CHN | Chen Tao (from Shanghai Shenhua) |

Out:

| No. | Pos. | Nation | Player |
|---|---|---|---|
| 5 | DF | CHN | Wang Xiao (Retired) |
| 11 | MF | CHN | Li Xingcan (loan to Tianjin Runyulong) |
| 12 | MF | CHN | Tian Yuan (to Shenyang Dongjin) |
| 14 | DF | CRC | Rodolfo Rodríguez (Released) |
| 23 | GK | CHN | Liu Peng (to Shenyang Dongjin) |
| 24 | DF | CHN | Cui Zhongkai (loan to Tianjin Runyulong) |
| 33 | FW | CHI | José Luis Villanueva (to (Chile) Universidad Católica) |
| 34 | DF | UZB | Aleksandr Kletskov (Released) |
| 36 | MF | CHN | Chen Tao (loan return to Shanghai Shenhua) |
| - | GK | CHN | Yang Jun (to Guangzhou Evergrande) |
| - | DF | CHN | Liu Yi (to Shenyang Dongjin) |
| - | DF | CHN | Mao Kaiyu (loan to Shenyang Dongjin) |
| - | MF | CHN | Lü Wei (loan to Shenyang Dongjin) |
| - | MF | CHN | Yang Junjie (to Tianjin Runyulong) |

== League One ==
=== Beijing Baxy ===
In:

| No. | Pos. | Nation | Player |
|---|---|---|---|
| 21 | MF | CHN | Wang Qiancheng (from Beijing Guoan) |
| 27 | MF | CHN | Yao Shuang (loan from Beijing Guoan) |
| 28 | DF | CHN | Dong Yang (from Shanghai Zobon) |
| 29 | MF | CMR | Paul Essola (Free Agent) |
| 30 | FW | USA | Lyle Martin (from Hubei Wuhan Zhongbo) |
| 31 | MF | CHN | Wang Wenan (from Beijing Guoan) |
| 32 | MF | CHN | Wen Bo (from Beijing Guoan) |
| 33 | MF | CHN | Li Lei (from Beijing Guoan) |
| 35 | MF | CHN | Xue Fei (loan from Beijing Guoan) |

Out:

| No. | Pos. | Nation | Player |
|---|---|---|---|
| 15 | DF | CHN | Du Xianze (Released) |
| 17 | MF | CHN | Jiang Lin (to Fujian Smart Hero) |
| 19 | MF | CHN | Jing Deyang (to Fujian Smart Hero) |
| 23 | GK | CHN | Guo Wei (loan return to Dalian Shide) |
| 24 | MF | CHN | Ren Jianglong (Released) |
| 26 | MF | CHN | Zhang Zuojun (Released) |
| 27 | DF | CHN | Jiao Yang (Released) |
| 28 | DF | CHN | Lu Ming (Released) |
| 29 | DF | CHN | Li Taoyu (to Hunan Billows) |
| 31 | DF | CHN | Zhang Yu (Released) |
| 33 | DF | CHN | Wang Lei (Released) |
| 34 | DF | CHN | Zhao Yuan (Released) |
| 39 | MF | CHN | Gao Leilei (Retired) |

=== Beijing Technology ===
In:

| No. | Pos. | Nation | Player |
|---|---|---|---|
| 2 | DF | KOR | Chae Wan-Ji (from (Japan) Cobaltore Onagawa) |
| 9 | MF | URU | Héctor García (from (Honduras) C.D.S. Vida) |
| 17 | MF | URU | Julio Gutiérrez (from (Uruguay) El Tanque Sisley) |

Out:

| No. | Pos. | Nation | Player |
|---|---|---|---|
| 3 | MF | KOR | Lim Jong-Wook (Released) |
| 9 | MF | IDN | Raphael Maitimo (to (Indonesia) Bali Devata F.C.) |
| 17 | FW | KOR | Lee Kil-Yong (Released) |
| 38 | FW | NED | Emir Jasarevic (Released) |
| 39 | DF | CHN | Wang Jie (loan return to Jiangsu Sainty) |

=== Chongqing Lifan ===
In:

| No. | Pos. | Nation | Player |
|---|---|---|---|
| 3 | DF | CHN | Yang Yun (from Shanghai Shenhua) |
| 8 | MF | BRA | Raí (from (Brazil) Portuguesa) |
| 9 | FW | BIH | Želimir Terkeš (from (Croatia) NK Zadar) |
| 10 | FW | CRO | Ivan Bošnjak (from (Greece) Iraklis) |
| 12 | FW | CHN | Zhang Chiming (Free Agent) |
| 18 | MF | CHN | Cui Min (from Yanbian Baekdu Tigers) |
| 23 | GK | CHN | Zhang Lei (from Shenzhen Phoenix) |
| 30 | DF | CRO | Dario Dabac (from (Croatia) NK Nehaj) |
| 32 | DF | CHN | Lu Haidong (from Shanghai East Asia) |
| - | MF | CRO | Stjepan Jukić (from Qingdao Jonoon) |

Out:

| No. | Pos. | Nation | Player |
|---|---|---|---|
| 1 | GK | CHN | Yang Wang (Released) |
| 3 | DF | CHN | Zhao Hejing (to Dalian Aerbin) |
| 5 | DF | CHN | Li Siyuan (to Chongqing F.C.) |
| 6 | MF | CHN | Wang Kai (loan to Chengdu Blades) |
| 7 | MF | CHN | Wu Qing (to Dalian Aerbin) |
| 8 | FW | CHN | Fan Dongqing (Released) |
| 10 | FW | BRA | José Duarte (to Tianjin Runyulong) |
| 14 | FW | CHN | Huang Xiyang (to Henan Jianye) |
| 15 | MF | CHN | Zhang Li (loan to Chengdu Blades) |
| 18 | DF | CHN | Hu Wei (loan to Chengdu Blades) |
| 19 | MF | CHN | Liang Bin (Released) |
| 21 | MF | CHN | Liu Xiaofeng (Released) |
| 22 | GK | CHN | Yu Yongzhe (to Guangdong Sunray Cave) |
| 24 | MF | CHN | Chen Chunlong (Released) |
| 25 | GK | CHN | He Zhengyuan (Retired) |
| 26 | MF | CHN | Bai Zijian (to (South Korea) Daejeon Citizen) |
| 27 | DF | CHN | Liu Jialin (loan to Chengdu Blades) |
| 37 | GK | CHN | Tian Xu (to Tianjin Teda) |
| 40 | DF | CIV | Mariko Daouda (Released) |
| 41 | DF | CRO | Bruno Šiklić (to Hubei Zhongbo) |
| 42 | FW | CRC | Johnny Woodly Lambert (loan return to Changchun Yatai) |

=== Dalian Aerbin ===
In:

| No. | Pos. | Nation | Player |
|---|---|---|---|
| 3 | DF | CHN | Zhao Hejing (from Chongqing Lifan) |
| 7 | MF | CHN | Wu Qing (from Chongqing Lifan) |
| 8 | FW | COL | Edison Chará (from (Peru) Unión Comercio) |
| 9 | FW | CRC | Johnny Woodly Lambert (from Changchun Yatai) |
| 14 | MF | CHN | Hu Zhaojun (from Guangzhou Evergrande) |
| 16 | DF | BUL | Kiril Kotev (from (Bulgaria) Lokomotiv Plovdiv) |
| 19 | DF | CHN | Liu Tianqi (loan from Shaanxi Chan-Ba) |
| 20 | MF | GNB | Almami Moreira (from (Serbia) FK Partizan) |
| 25 | MF | CHN | Quan Heng (from Shenzhen Ruby) |
| 26 | FW | CHN | Chen Han (Free Agent) |
| 28 | DF | CHN | Wang Hongyou (from Hangzhou Greentown) |
| 33 | DF | CHN | Jiang Wenjun (from Pudong Zobon) |
| - | MF | CHN | Li Qi (from Changchun Yatai) |

Out:

| No. | Pos. | Nation | Player |
|---|---|---|---|
| 3 | DF | CHN | Zhang Song (loan to Fujian Smart Hero) |
| 7 | MF | CHN | Zhuang Yuan (to Fushun Xinye) |
| 8 | MF | CHN | Zhao Kening (Released) |
| 9 | FW | CHN | Xu Yiwen (Released) |
| 11 | FW | CHN | Hou Zhe (loan to Fujian Smart Hero) |
| 14 | DF | CHN | Yu Zhen (loan to Fujian Smart Hero) |
| 17 | DF | CHN | Wang Jing (to Hubei CTGU Kangtian) |
| 20 | MF | CHN | Li Yuhang (Released) |
| 21 | MF | CHN | Zhu Junye (Released) |
| 22 | DF | CHN | Sun Yunpeng (Released) |
| 28 | MF | CHN | Song Lihui (Retired) |
| 33 | DF | CHN | Yu Yang (loan return to Beijing Guoan) |

=== Guangdong Sunray Cave ===
In:

| No. | Pos. | Nation | Player |
|---|---|---|---|
| 2 | DF | CHN | Li Zhihai (from Guangzhou Evergrande) |
| 5 | DF | CRC | Darío Delgado (from (Costa Rica) Puntarenas) |
| 6 | DF | CHN | Ge Zhen (from Anhui Jiufang) |
| 9 | FW | BRA | Ronny (from (Portugal) S.C. Beira-Mar) |
| 12 | FW | COL | Ricardo Steer (from Changchun Yatai) |
| 23 | MF | CHN | Lu Lin (from Guangzhou Evergrande) |
| 26 | GK | CHN | Yu Yongzhe (from Chongqing Lifan) |
| 27 | MF | CHN | Zhong Peihao (from Guangzhou Evergrande) |
| 28 | MF | CHN | Song Chao (from Anhui Jiufang) |

Out:

| No. | Pos. | Nation | Player |
|---|---|---|---|
| 3 | DF | CHN | Zhao Wei (to Hunan Billows) |
| 5 | DF | BRA | Joel Padilha (to (Hong Kong) South China) |
| 6 | DF | BRA | Luiz Henrique (to (Brazil) Inter de Santa Maria) |
| 8 | MF | CHN | Chen Xu (to (Macau) Lam Ieng) |
| 9 | FW | BRA | Giovane (to (Hong Kong) South China) |
| 12 | FW | CHN | Huang Jiaqiang (loan return to Guangzhou Evergrande) |
| 23 | GK | CHN | Zhi Silong (Released) |
| 28 | FW | CHN | Ye Weichao (loan return to Guangzhou Evergrande) |
| 29 | DF | CHN | Zhang Jian (to (Macau) G.D. Lam Pak) |

=== Guizhou Zhicheng ===
In:

| No. | Pos. | Nation | Player |
|---|---|---|---|
| 5 | DF | CHN | Lin Longchang (from Hangzhou Greentown) |
| 15 | DF | SRB | Dragan Stančić (from Nanjing Yoyo) |
| 16 | DF | CMR | Thomas Manga (Free Agent) |
| 22 | MF | CHN | Su Boyang (from Beijing Guoan) |
| 25 | MF | CHN | Liu Pujin (from Pudong Zobon) |
| 26 | DF | CHN | Yu Tianzhu (from Beijing Guoan) |
| 27 | MF | CHN | Sun Xiaokun (from Pudong Zobon) |
| 28 | MF | CHN | Zhao Yang (from Henan Construction) |
| 29 | MF | CHN | Zhang Lifeng (from Nanchang Hengyuan) |
| 33 | DF | CHN | Wang Tao (from Wenzhou Provenza) |
| 36 | MF | CHN | Wang Jianwen (from Pudong Zobon) |
| 37 | FW | BRA | Mauro (Free Agent) |

Out:

| No. | Pos. | Nation | Player |
|---|---|---|---|
| 7 | MF | CHN | Chen Mao (Released) |
| 14 | MF | CHN | Liu Wei (Released) |
| 22 | MF | CHN | Wang Jingsong (Released) |
| 29 | MF | CHN | Zhang Pengfei (Released) |

=== Hunan Billows ===
In:

| No. | Pos. | Nation | Player |
|---|---|---|---|
| 2 | DF | BRA | William (Free Agent) |
| 4 | MF | CHN | Cao Huan (from Shaanxi Chan-Ba) |
| 8 | MF | CHN | Xu Deen (from Guangzhou Evergrande) |
| 10 | FW | HON | Jerry Palacios (from Hangzhou Greentown) |
| 16 | MF | CHN | Xie Weichao (from Shenzhen Phoenix) |
| 27 | DF | CHN | Zhao Wei (from Guangdong Sunray Cave) |
| 29 | FW | CHN | Akram (Free Agent) |
| 30 | FW | CHN | Chen Peng (Free Agent) |
| 32 | GK | CHN | Li shi (Free Agent) |
| 33 | DF | CHN | Li Taoyu (from Beijing Baxy) |
| 34 | DF | CHN | Yang Huikang (from Shanghai Shenhua) |

Out:

| No. | Pos. | Nation | Player |
|---|---|---|---|
| 2 | MF | CHN | Tu Quanxin (Retired) |
| 4 | DF | CHN | Wei Qiang (Released) |
| 8 | MF | CHN | Zhang Pengnan (Released) |
| 10 | FW | CHN | Yue Yang (Released) |
| 15 | DF | CHN | Zhang Xin (Released) |
| 16 | MF | CHN | Zi Long (loan return to Henan Construction) |
| 29 | MF | CHN | Lü Gang (Released) |
| 30 | DF | BRA | Neto (Released) |
| 32 | FW | BRA | Edmilson (Released) |

=== Hubei Wuhan Zhongbo ===
In:

| No. | Pos. | Nation | Player |
|---|---|---|---|
| 5 | DF | CRO | Bruno Šiklić (from Chongqing Lifan) |
| 7 | DF | CHN | Cai Shun (loan from Hangzhou Greentown) |
| 9 | FW | SVN | Jože Benko (from (Slovenia) NK Nafta) |
| 12 | MF | CHN | Sang Yifei (from Beijing Guoan) |
| 19 | FW | CHN | Huang Jie (loan from Changchun Yatai) |
| 24 | MF | CHN | Hu Zhuowei (loan return from Jiangsu Sainty) |
| 31 | FW | BRA | Vicente (from Shanghai Shenhua) |
| 33 | MF | CHN | Yang Shilin (from Henan Construction) |
| 34 | DF | CHN | Wang Xiaoshi (from Guangzhou Evergrande) |
| 37 | DF | CHN | Qu Shaoyan (Free Agent) |
| - | MF | CHN | Li Wenqiang (Free Agent) |
| - | MF | CHN | Jiang Sheng (Free Agent) |

Out:

| No. | Pos. | Nation | Player |
|---|---|---|---|
| 2 | DF | CHN | Wang Sheng (to Fushun Xinye) |
| 4 | DF | CHN | An Bing (Released) |
| 6 | MF | BRA | Everton (Released) |
| 7 | MF | CHN | Wang Wenhua (Retired) |
| 9 | FW | BRA | Rodrigues (Released) |
| 12 | MF | CHN | Chen Hao (Released) |
| 19 | FW | CHN | Kong Linglong (to Hubei CTGU Kangtian) |
| 21 | DF | CHN | Xu Yang (Released) |
| 22 | MF | CHN | Meng Wei (to Chongqing F.C.) |
| 24 | DF | CHN | Sun Weirong (Released) |
| 29 | MF | CHN | Wu Kai (Released) |
| 31 | DF | CHN | Mo Jiasheng (Retired) |
| 33 | DF | CHN | Chai Lei (Released) |
| 34 | DF | CHN | Hu Peilong (to Chongqing F.C.) |
| 37 | FW | USA | Lyle Martin (to Beijing Baxy) |

=== Shanghai East Asia ===
In:

| No. | Pos. | Nation | Player |
|---|---|---|---|
| 3 | DF | CHN | Tang Jiaqi (from Shanghai Shenhua) |
| 5 | MF | BEN | Romuald Boco (Free Agent) |
| 10 | FW | CHN | Chen Zijie (loan from Shaanxi Chan-Ba) |
| 14 | FW | BRA | Cílio Souza (from Nanjing Yoyo) |
| 17 | FW | BIH | Jusuf Dajić (from (Bosnia and Herzegovina) FK Sloboda Tuzla) |
| 24 | GK | CHN | Yang Guidong (Free Agent) |

Out:

| No. | Pos. | Nation | Player |
|---|---|---|---|
| 3 | DF | CHN | Zheng Kaimu (to Chongqing F.C.) |
| 5 | MF | CHN | Wang Jiayu (to Nanchang Hengyuan) |
| 8 | MF | CHN | Cao Yunding (to Shanghai Shenhua) |
| 11 | MF | CHN | Jiang Zhipeng (to Nanchang Hengyuan) |
| 15 | DF | CHN | Lu Haidong (to Chongqing Lifan) |
| 20 | DF | CHN | Zhang Linpeng (to Guangzhou Evergrande) |
| 24 | GK | CHN | Gu Chao (to Hangzhou Greentown) |
| 29 | FW | HAI | Fabrice Noël (Released) |
| 33 | FW | COL | Martín García (to (Peru) Sport Boys) |
| 36 | FW | BRA | Rodrigo Silva (Released) |

=== Shenyang Dongjin ===
In:

| No. | Pos. | Nation | Player |
|---|---|---|---|
| 6 | DF | CHN | Liu Yi (from Tianjin Teda) |
| 8 | DF | CHN | Lü Wei (loan from Tianjin Teda) |
| 9 | MF | CRO | Željko Sablic (from (Croatia) NK Junak Sinj) |
| 10 | FW | NGA | Akanni-Sunday Wasiu (from Shenzhen Phoenix) |
| 11 | MF | CHN | Tian Yuan (from Tianjin Teda) |
| 12 | DF | KOR | Sung Jong-Hyun (from (South Korea) Jeonbuk Hyundai Motors) |
| 21 | MF | CHN | Wang Qingfeng (from Shenzhen Ruby) |
| 26 | MF | CHN | Liu Xisheng (Free Agent) |
| 27 | MF | CHN | Yang Deliang (Free Agent) |
| 30 | GK | CHN | Zhang Chen (from Shanghai Shenhua) |
| 31 | GK | CHN | Zhu QI (from Tianjin Teda) |
| 32 | DF | CHN | Mao Kaiyu (loan from Tianjin Teda) |
| 33 | DF | SRB | Milan Martinović (Free Agent) |
| - | MF | CHN | Huo Liang (Free Agent) |

Out:

| No. | Pos. | Nation | Player |
|---|---|---|---|
| 3 | DF | CHN | Wang Chao (to Fujian Smart Hero) |
| 6 | MF | CHN | Yin Liangyi (to Dalian Yiteng) |
| 7 | MF | CHN | Gao Wanguo (to Yanbian Baekdu Tigers) |
| 8 | MF | CAN | Rumbani Munthali (Released) |
| 9 | MF | BRA | Agnaldo (Released) |
| 10 | FW | BRA | Anderson Luiz (Released) |
| 11 | FW | NGA | Philip Edeipo (to (Kazakhstan) FC Kaisar) |
| 12 | GK | CHN | Zhang Lie (to Shaanxi Chanba) |
| 20 | FW | CHN | Deng Li (to Dalian Yiteng) |
| 21 | MF | CHN | Wang Ruoji (Released) |
| 26 | MF | CHN | Wang Junzhe (Released) |
| 27 | MF | CHN | Meng Weiping (Released) |
| 32 | MF | CHN | Zhao Ming (to Tianjin Runyulong) |
| 36 | DF | CHN | Chen Bo (Retired) |

=== Shenzhen Phoenix ===
In:

| No. | Pos. | Nation | Player |
|---|---|---|---|
| 2 | DF | CHN | Sui Donglu (from Chengdu Blades) |
| 8 | MF | SRB | Aleksandar Živković (from Shenzhen Ruby) |
| 10 | MF | BRA | Harison (from Chengdu Blades) |
| 11 | FW | ANG | Johnson Macaba (from (Brazil) Goiás) |
| 14 | FW | CHN | Cao Tianbao (loan from Changchun Yatai) |
| 17 | DF | CHN | Li Zhe (from Nanjing Yoyo) |
| 18 | FW | CHN | Kong Lingxi (Free Agent) |
| 20 | MF | CHN | Tang Miao (from Beijing Guoan) |
| 24 | MF | CHN | Li Lingwei (from Shenzhen Ruby) |
| 25 | FW | BRA | Beto (from Nanchang Hengyuan) |
| 28 | MF | CHN | Huang Long (from Shenzhen Ruby) |
| 29 | FW | CHN | Zhang Shuo (from (Australia) Newcastle United Jets) |
| - | MF | CHN | Mou Yongjie (loan return from (Indonesia) Sriwijaya) |

Out:

| No. | Pos. | Nation | Player |
|---|---|---|---|
| 3 | DF | CHN | Zhang Chenglin (to Shaanxi Chanba) |
| 5 | MF | CRO | Frane Čačić (Released) |
| 7 | MF | CHN | Wen Huyi (to Shanghai Shenhua) |
| 8 | MF | CHN | Liu Jianye (to Jiangsu Sainty) |
| 11 | FW | NGA | Akanni-Sunday Wasiu (to Shenyang Dongjin) |
| 12 | MF | CHN | Xie Weichao (to Hunan Billows) |
| 13 | FW | BRA | Sandro (Released) |
| 14 | MF | KOR | Woo Choo-Young (to Yanbian Baekdu Tigers) |
| 16 | MF | CHN | Yang Fusheng (Released) |
| 17 | MF | CHN | Wang Fei (Released) |
| 18 | DF | CHN | Wang Qiang (to Shandong Luneng) |
| 20 | FW | CHN | Zhang Chengxiang (to Shaanxi Chanba) |
| 21 | DF | CHN | Ren Hang (to Jiangsu Sainty) |
| 23 | GK | CHN | Zhang Lei (to Chongqing Lifan) |
| 25 | MF | CHN | Li Wenxin (Released) |
| 31 | DF | CHN | Wang Guanyu (to Jiangsu Sainty) |
| 32 | MF | CHN | Mou Yongjie (to (Indonesia) Sriwijaya F.C.) |
| 33 | DF | CHN | Guo Chaolu (Released) |
| 35 | MF | CHN | Ye Hui (Released) |

=== Tianjin Runyulong ===
In:

| No. | Pos. | Nation | Player |
|---|---|---|---|
| 4 | DF | COL | Andrés Quejada (from (Colombia) Deportes Palmira) |
| 6 | DF | CHN | Chen Yongqiang (from Shanghai Shenhua) |
| 7 | DF | CHN | Cui Zhongkai (loan from Tianjin Teda) |
| 8 | MF | CHN | Zhao Ming (from Shenyang Dongjin) |
| 9 | FW | BRA | José Duarte (from Chongqing Lifan) |
| 10 | MF | BRA | Ernandes (Free Agent) |
| 11 | FW | CHN | He Tengfei (from Sichuan FC) |
| 17 | MF | CHN | Bai Fan (from Henan Construction) |
| 20 | MF | CHN | Yang Junjie (from Tianjin Teda) |
| 26 | MF | CHN | Su Di (Free Agent) |
| 29 | MF | CHN | Li Xingcan (loan from Tianjin Teda) |

Out:

| No. | Pos. | Nation | Player |
|---|---|---|---|
| 5 | DF | CHN | Yang Yong (Released) |
| 7 | DF | CHN | Hao Qiang (Released) |
| 8 | MF | CHN | Cui Yongzhe (to Yanbian Baekdu Tigers) |
| 10 | FW | BRA | Marcinho (Released) |
| 15 | DF | CHN | Ge Zhen (to Guangdong Sunray Cave) |
| 16 | MF | CHN | Gao Furong (Released) |
| 17 | MF | CHN | Guo Jialiang (Released) |
| 18 | MF | CHN | Huang Lei (Released) |
| 19 | MF | CHN | Gao Xiaofeng (Released) |
| 20 | MF | CHN | Ma Xiaolei (loan to (Lithuania) FK Sūduva) |
| 21 | FW | CHN | Huang Ke (Released) |
| 23 | MF | CHN | Song Chao (to Guangdong Sunray Cave) |
| 27 | FW | CHN | Xu Chao (Released) |
| 35 | DF | BUL | Yordan Varbanov (to (Bulgaria) PFC Lokomotiv Sofia) |

=== Tianjin Songjiang ===
In:

| No. | Pos. | Nation | Player |
|---|---|---|---|
| 2 | DF | CHN | Yao Zhen (from Hangzhou Greentown) |
| 3 | DF | CHN | Yu Rui (from Chengdu Blades) |
| 6 | DF | CHN | Liu Tao (from Jiangsu Sainty) |
| 8 | MF | CHN | Wang Qiang (from Shanghai Shenhua) |
| 10 | FW | CHN | Wu Bo (from Chengdu Blades) |
| 12 | GK | CHN | Guo Chunquan (Free Agent) |
| 15 | MF | CHN | Zhang Yong (from Shaanxi Chanba) |
| 16 | DF | CHN | Yu Chengnan (from Shaanxi Chanba) |
| 17 | FW | CHN | Xue Chen (from Shandong Luneng) |
| 19 | DF | CHN | Liu Shangkun (from Shandong Luneng) |
| 23 | DF | CHN | Wang Hao (from Nanjing Yoyo) |
| 25 | FW | BRA | Júnior Paulista (from Pudong Zobon) |
| 26 | DF | EST | Taavi Rähn (from (Russia) Baltika Kaliningrad) |
| 30 | FW | SLE | Aluspah Brewah (from Jiangsu Sainty) |
| 31 | FW | SVN | Aleksander Rodić (from (Slovenia) Interblock Ljubljana) |

Out:

| No. | Pos. | Nation | Player |
|---|---|---|---|
| 2 | DF | CHN | Wang Wei (Released) |
| 3 | DF | CHN | Yu Rui (loan return to Chengdu Blades) |
| 6 | DF | CHN | Cui Baoan (Released) |
| 8 | DF | CHN | Zhang Chaosong (Released) |
| 10 | MF | CHN | Wu Bo (loan return to Chengdu Blades) |
| 12 | MF | CHN | Qi Yabin (Released) |
| 13 | MF | CHN | Ding Peng (to Chongqing F.C.) |
| 14 | MF | CHN | Jiang Zhiyu (Released) |
| 15 | MF | CHN | Zhang Yong (loan return to Shaanxi Chanba) |
| 16 | MF | CHN | Jiang Tao (Released) |
| 17 | MF | CHN | Yi Yang (Released) |
| 19 | MF | CHN | Xiao Yao (Released) |
| 26 | MF | CHN | Yu Chao (Released) |
| 33 | MF | CHN | Huang Yong (Released) |

=== Yanbian Changbai Tiger ===
In:

| No. | Pos. | Nation | Player |
|---|---|---|---|
| 7 | FW | CHN | Gao Wanguo (from Shenyang Dongjin) |
| 11 | MF | CHN | Cui Yongzhe (from Anhui Jiufang) |
| 21 | MF | KOR | Woo Choo-Young (from Shenzhen Phoenix) |
| 24 | MF | CHN | Han Hao (Free Agent) |
| 31 | FW | KOR | Lee Kwang-Jae (from (South Korea) Jeonbuk Hyundai Motors) |
| 35 | FW | KOR | Park Jong-Woo (from (South Korea) Ulsan Hyundai Mipo Dockyard) |
| 39 | MF | CHN | Yu Feng (Free Agent) |

Out:

| No. | Pos. | Nation | Player |
|---|---|---|---|
| 3 | DF | CMR | Clément Lebe (Released) |
| 7 | MF | CHN | Cui Min (to Chongqing Lifan) |
| 8 | FW | CHN | Piao Wanzhe (Released) |
| 10 | MF | CHN | Piao Cheng (to Beijing Guoan) |
| 13 | FW | CHN | Li Jie (to Chongqing F.C.) |
| 19 | MF | CHN | Han Songfeng (to Qingdao QUST) |
| 20 | MF | CHN | Zheng Linguo (Released) |
| 23 | MF | KOR | Ahn Jung-Ryeok (Released) |
| 24 | MF | CHN | Li Minhui (Released) |
| 33 | FW | RWA | Jean-Paul Eale Lutula (loan return to (Belgium) FC Brussels) |
