= List of Chinese football transfers summer 2010 =

This is a list of Chinese football transfers for the 2010 season summer transfer window. Only moves from Super League and League One are listed. The transfer window opened from 30 June to 28 July.

== Super League ==
=== Beijing Guoan ===
In: Note: Flags indicate national team as defined under FIFA eligibility rules; some limited exceptions apply. Players may hold more than one non-FIFA nationality.

No.	Pos.	Nation	Player
35	MF	HON	Walter Martínez (from (Honduras) C.D. Marathón)

Out: Note: Flags indicate national team as defined under FIFA eligibility rules; some limited exceptions apply. Players may hold more than one non-FIFA nationality.

No.	Pos.	Nation	Player
10	FW	BRA	Valdo (to (Japan) Shonan Bellmare)
32	DF	CHN	Yu Yang (loan to Dalian Aerbin)

=== Changchun Yatai ===
In:

No.	Pos.	Nation	Player
39	MF	CHN	Jiang Zhe (from Dalian Yiteng)
40	FW	CHN	Hu Xi (from Hubei CTGU Kangtian)
41	DF	SRB	Miloš Mihajlov (from (Romania) Politehnica Iaşi)
42	FW	BRA	Nei (from (Saudi Arabia) Al-Shabab)

Out:

No.	Pos.	Nation	Player
3	DF	CHN	Tang Jing (loan to Jiangsu Sainty)
12	DF	CHN	Ai Zhibo (loan to Jiangsu Sainty)
24	MF	CHN	Yan Feng (to Dalian Shide)
9	FW	CRC	Johnny Woodly Lambert (loan to Chongqing Lifan)

=== Changsha Ginde ===
In:

No.	Pos.	Nation	Player

Out:

No.	Pos.	Nation	Player
10	FW	COD	M'peti Nimba (to (Israel) Ironi Bat Yam)
27	MF	CHN	Zhao Ming (to Shenyang Dongjin)
32	MF	CHN	Mou Yongjie (loan to (Indonesia) Sriwijaya)

=== Chongqing Lifan ===
In:

No.	Pos.	Nation	Player
41	DF	CRO	Bruno Šiklić (from (Croatia) NK Zadar)
42	FW	CRC	Johnny Woodly Lambert (loan from Changchun Yatai)

Out:

No.	Pos.	Nation	Player
9	FW	SRB	Dušan Đokić (to (Poland) Zagłębie Lubin)
11	MF	UGA	Andrew Mwesigwa (Released)
39	DF	KOR	Cho Se-Kwon (Released)

=== Dalian Shide ===
In:

No.	Pos.	Nation	Player
9	FW	BUL	Martin Kamburov (from (Bulgaria) Lokomotiv Sofia)
24	MF	CHN	Yan Feng (from Changchun Yatai)
33	MF	BRA	Márcio Senna (from (Brazil) Red Bull Brasil)

Out:

No.	Pos.	Nation	Player
-	FW	CHN	Zou Jie (loan to Dalian Yiteng)
17	MF	CRC	José Luis López Ramírez (loan return to (Costa Rica) Deportivo Saprissa)
2	DF	CRC	Porfirio López Meza (Released)

=== Hangzhou Greentown ===
In:

No.	Pos.	Nation	Player
34	DF	AUS	Adam Griffiths (from (Australia) Adelaide United)
36	DF	HON	Emil Martínez (from (Mexico) Indios)

Out:

No.	Pos.	Nation	Player
6	MF	CHN	Zhang Ye (to Liaoning Whowin)

=== Henan Jianye ===
In:

No.	Pos.	Nation	Player

Out:

No.	Pos.	Nation	Player
14	FW	SEN	Amado Diallo (Released)
30	DF	SRB	Goran Gavrančić (Retired)
35	DF	SRB	Miloš Bajalica (to Shaanxi Baorong Chanba)
15	MF	CHN	Liu Xiang (loan to Beijing Baxy&Shengshi)

=== Jiangsu Sainty ===
In:

No.	Pos.	Nation	Player
38	DF	CHN	Tang Jing (loan from Changchun Yatai)
39	DF	CHN	Ai Zhibo (loan from Changchun Yatai)
41	FW	NGA	Victor Agali (from (Greece) Levadiakos)
42	FW	SLE	Aluspah Brewah (Free Agent)

Out:

No.	Pos.	Nation	Player
10	FW	BRA	Éber (Released)
17	FW	BRA	Pedro (Released)
19	DF	CHN	Wang Jie (loan to Beijing Technology)
30	MF	CHN	Li Zhuangfei (to Qingdao Jonoon)

=== Liaoning Whowin ===
In:

No.	Pos.	Nation	Player
36	MF	CHN	Zhang Ye (from Hangzhou Greentown)
39	DF	UZB	Islom Inomov (from (Uzbekistan) Nasaf Qarshi)
37	FW	BRA	Gilcimar (loan from (Brazil) Mesquita)

Out:

No.	Pos.	Nation	Player
32	FW	BRA	Felipe Tigrão (Released)

=== Nanchang Hengyuan ===
In:

No.	Pos.	Nation	Player
41	MF	UZB	Asqar Jadigerov (from (Uzbekistan) Pakhtakor Tashkent)
43	FW	BRA	Alexsandro (Free Agent)
42		CHN	Li Tong (Free Agent)

Out:

No.	Pos.	Nation	Player
39	FW	TRI	Kevaughn Connell (Released)
11	MF	SYR	Adel Abdullah (Released)
10	FW	BRA	Alex (loan return to (Brazil) Palmeiras)
35	DF	CHN	Gu Zhongqing (to Guizhou Zhicheng)
31	MF	CHN	Li Wenqiang (Released)
27	DF	CHN	Wang Weipeng (Released)

=== Qingdao Jonoon ===
In:

No.	Pos.	Nation	Player
37	DF	KOR	Lee Yoon-Sup (Free Agent)
38	MF	CHN	Li Zhuangfei (from Jiangsu Sainty)
40	DF	BIH	Ninoslav Milenković (from (Cyprus) Enosis Neon Paralimni)
41	MF	CHN	Yu Haiyang (Free Agent)
42	DF	CHN	Ding Wenhua (Free Agent)

Out:

No.	Pos.	Nation	Player
3	DF	KOR	Lee Sung-Min (Released)
4	DF	SRB	Ivan Vukomanović (Released)
19	FW	SVN	Tomislav Mišura (Released)

=== Shaanxi Baorong Chanba ===
In:

No.	Pos.	Nation	Player
2	DF	SRB	Miloš Bajalica (from Henan Construction)
39	FW	CRO	Ivan Brečević (from (Slovenia) ND Gorica)
41	MF	CHN	Liu Qisheng (from (Brazil) Paraná Clube B)

Out:

No.	Pos.	Nation	Player
3	DF	BRA	Célio (Released)
8	FW	USA	Lyle Martin (to Hubei Luyin)
9	FW	CHN	Li Yi (Released)
13	MF	CHN	Wang Erzhuo (loan to Shenzhen Ruby)
32	MF	CHN	Zhang Yong (loan to Tianjin Songjiang)

=== Shandong Luneng ===
In:

No.	Pos.	Nation	Player
35	DF	MLI	Mourtala Diakité (from (Portugal) Belenenses)
36	FW	FRA	Michaël Murcy (from (France) Clermont Foot)
38	MF	HON	Julio César de León (loan from (Italy) Parma)

Out:

No.	Pos.	Nation	Player
4	DF	SRB	Siniša Radanović (to (Serbia) Hajduk Kula)
14	FW	NED	Fred Benson (loan return to (Netherlands) RKC Waalwijk)

=== Shanghai Shenhua ===
In:

No.	Pos.	Nation	Player
33	DF	ARG	Matías Villavicencio (from (Argentina) Atlético Tucumán)
-	DF	BUL	Yanko Vâlkanov (loan return from Shenzhen Ruby)

Out:

No.	Pos.	Nation	Player
4	DF	CHN	Sun Xiang (to Guangzhou FC)
13	DF	CHN	Cheng Liang (loan to Shenzhen Ruby)
10	MF	CHN	Chen Tao (loan to Tianjin Teda)
3	DF	BRA	Aderaldo (loan return to (Brazil) Paraná)
-	DF	BUL	Yanko Vâlkanov (to (Belarus) FC Dinamo Minsk)

=== Shenzhen Ruby ===
In:

No.	Pos.	Nation	Player
9	FW	NZL	Chris Killen (from (England) Middlesbrough)
36	DF	CHN	Cheng Liang (loan from Shanghai Shenhua)
37	DF	NZL	Ivan Vicelich (loan from (New Zealand) Auckland City)
35	MF	CHN	Wang Erzhuo (loan from Shaanxi Baorong Chanba)

Out:

No.	Pos.	Nation	Player
3	DF	BUL	Yanko Vâlkanov (loan return to Shanghai Shenhua)
33	FW	BRA	Tiago Honório (loan to Chengdu Blades)
15	DF	CHN	Xiang Jun (to Beijing BIT)
34	MF	CHN	Zhu Cong (to Guangdong Sunray Cave)
14	DF	CHN	Wang Tao (to Wenzhou Provenza)
19	MF	CHN	Li Haoyuan (loan to (Indonesia) Persiwa Wamena)

=== Tianjin Teda ===
In:

No.	Pos.	Nation	Player
33	FW	CHI	José Luis Villanueva (from (Uzbekistan) FC Bunyodkor)
34	DF	UZB	Aleksandr Kletskov (from (Uzbekistan) Pakhtakor Tashkent)
36	MF	CHN	Chen Tao (loan from Shanghai Shenhua)
35	FW	ARG	Luciano Olguín (from (Greece) Pierikos)

Out:

No.	Pos.	Nation	Player
9	FW	NGA	Alfred Emuejeraye (Released)
18	FW	UZB	Farhod Tojiyev (loan return to (Uzbekistan) Pakhtakor Tashkent)

== League One ==
=== Anhui Jiufang ===
In:

No.	Pos.	Nation	Player
9	MF	GAM	Matthew Mendy (Free Agent)
37	DF	CHN	Hua Bo (Free Agent)
36	FW	CHN	Wang Peng (Free Agent)

Out:

No.	Pos.	Nation	Player
11	MF	BRA	Hélton (Released)
33	FW	BRA	Rodrigo Paulista (Released)

=== Beijing Baxy&Shengshi ===
In:

No.	Pos.	Nation	Player
14	MF	CHN	Liu Xiang (loan from Henan Jianye)
39	MF	CHN	Gao Leilei (from (United States) NSC Minnesota Stars)
37	FW	CHN	Jin Hui (from (England) Everton)
38	DF	USA	John Krause (from (Vietnam) Hòa Phát Hà Nội)
36	DF	MNE	Vlado Jeknić (from (Hungary) Diósgyőri VTK)

Out:

No.	Pos.	Nation	Player

=== Beijing Technology ===
In:

No.	Pos.	Nation	Player
39	DF	CHN	Wang Jie (loan from Jiangsu Sainty)
28	DF	CHN	Wang Chao (from Hohai University)
17	FW	KOR	Lee Kil-Yong (from (South Korea) Changwon City)
37	DF	CHN	Xiang Jun (from Shenzhen Ruby)

Out:

No.	Pos.	Nation	Player
2	DF	NED	Jeroen Nagel (Released)

=== Chengdu Blades ===
In:

No.	Pos.	Nation	Player
15	FW	CHN	Yang Changpeng (Free Agent)
21	FW	BRA	Tiago Honório (loan from Shenzhen Ruby)

Out:

No.	Pos.	Nation	Player
19	MF	CHN	Jiang Xiaoyu (loan to Shenyang Dongjin)
-	GK	CHN	Jin Wenxin (to Hubei Kangtian)
34	DF	BRA	Tiago Prado (Released)

=== Guangdong Sunray Cave ===
In:

No.	Pos.	Nation	Player
4	DF	CHN	Zhu Cong (from Shenzhen Ruby)

Out:

No.	Pos.	Nation	Player
24	DF	CHN	Chen Haibin (released)
20	DF	CHN	Wei Huiping (released)

=== Guangzhou GAC ===
In:

No.	Pos.	Nation	Player
32	DF	CHN	Sun Xiang (from Shanghai Shenhua)
28	MF	CHN	Zheng Zhi (from (Scotland) Celtic FC)
31	FW	BRA	Muriqui (from (Brazil) Clube Atlético Mineiro)

Out:

No.	Pos.	Nation	Player
4	DF	AUS	John Tambouras (released)
––	FW	CHN	Zhu Pengfei (loan to Tianjin Ciity)

=== Hunan Billows ===
In:

No.	Pos.	Nation	Player
32	FW	BRA	Edmilson (from (Honduras) C.D. Victoria)

Out:

No.	Pos.	Nation	Player

=== Hubei Luyin ===
In:

No.	Pos.	Nation	Player
37	FW	USA	Lyle Martin (from Shaanxi Baorong Chanba)

Out:

No.	Pos.	Nation	Player
22	MF	CHN	Meng Wei (loan to Wenzhou Provenza)

=== Nanjing Yoyo ===
In:

No.	Pos.	Nation	Player

Out:

No.	Pos.	Nation	Player

=== Shanghai Zobon ===
In:

No.	Pos.	Nation	Player
29	FW	MNE	Radislav Sekulić (from (Montenegro) FK Mogren)
30	DF	SRB	Radenko Bojović (from (North Macedonia) FK Rabotnički)

Out:

No.	Pos.	Nation	Player
8	FW	CRO	Darko Cordaš (Released)

=== Shanghai East Asia ===
In:

No.	Pos.	Nation	Player
33	FW	COL	Martín García (from (Mexico) Veracruz)
36	FW	BRA	Rodrigo Silva (from (Spain) SD Huesca)

Out:

No.	Pos.	Nation	Player
9	FW	CRO	Kosta Bjedov (Released)

=== Shenyang Dongjin ===
In:

No.	Pos.	Nation	Player
-	MF	CHN	Jiang Xiaoyu (loan from Chengdu Blades)
32	MF	CHN	Zhao Ming (from Changsha Ginde)
29	DF	CHN	Liu Wenqing (Free Agent)

Out:

No.	Pos.	Nation	Player

=== Yanbian ===
In:

No.	Pos.	Nation	Player
23	MF	KOR	Ahn Jung-Ryeok (from Pai Chai University)

Out:

No.	Pos.	Nation	Player
19	MF	CHN	Han Songfeng (to Guizhou Zhicheng)
