= Welton Felipe =

Welton Felipe may refer to:

- Welton Felipe (footballer, born 1986), Brazilian football defender
- Welton Felipe (footballer, born 1997), Brazilian football forward
