= Yu Rui =

Yu Rui may refer to:

- Yu Rui (footballer) (born 1992), Chinese footballer
- Yu Rui (swimmer) (born 1982), Chinese swimmer
