= Chen Yongqiang =

Chen Yongqiang may refer to:

- Chen Yongqiang (sports shooter) (born 1974), Chinese sports shooter
- Chen Yongqiang (footballer) (born 1978), Chinese footballer
- Chen Yongqiang (painter)
