= Wang Ji =

Wang Ji may refer to:

- Wang Ji (Han dynasty) (王吉), Western Han official
- Wang Ji (Three Kingdoms) (王基; 190-261), Wei general
- Wang Ji (Ming dynasty politician) (王驥; 1378-1460), Ming dynasty politician
- Wang Ji (Jin dynasty) (王机; c.289-315), Jin dynasty official and rebel
- Wang Ji (physician) (汪機; 1463-1539), Ming dynasty physician
- Wang Ji (philosopher) (王幾; 1498–1583), a.k.a. Wang Longxi (王龍溪), Ming dynasty Chinese philosopher in the school of Wang Yangming
- Wang Ji (Qing dynasty), scholar of the Ming and Qing period, editor of the Ming History
- Chi Wang or Wang Ji, co-founder of U.S. China Policy Foundation
- Wang Ji (actress) (王姬, born 1962), Chinese actress

== See also ==
- Wang Jie (disambiguation)
