= Wang Jie =

Wang Jie may refer to:

Musicians

- Wang Jie (born 1962), also known as Dave Wang, Hong Kong-Taiwanese singer
- Wang Jie (composer) (born 1980), Chinese-born American composer

Athletes

- Wang Jie (beach volleyball) (born 1983), Chinese beach volleyball player
- Wang Jie (cyclist) (born 1988), Chinese cyclist
- Wang Jie (footballer, born 1982), Chinese association footballer
- Wang Jie (footballer, born 1989), Chinese association footballer

Politician

- Wang Jie (Qing dynasty), Qing dynasty politician

Taikonaut

- Wang Jie (taikonaut), Chinese astronaut

== See also ==
- Wang Ji (disambiguation)
