= Yang Yun =

Yang Yun may refer to:

- Yang Yun (gymnast) (born 1984), Chinese gymnast
- Yang Yun (footballer, born 1988) (born 1988), Chinese footballer
- Yang Yun (footballer, born 1989) (born 1989), Chinese footballer
- James Yun (born 1981), Korean American professional wrestler who used the ringname Yun Yang in World Championship Wrestling
