= Ji Chao =

Chinese footballer (born 1991)

Ji Chao 纪超
Personal information
- Date of birth: 11 January 1991 (age 35)
- Place of birth: Shenyang, Liaoning, China
- Height: 1.75 m (5 ft 9 in)
- Position: Midfielder

Senior career*
| Years | Team | Apps | (Gls) |
| 2010 | Shenzhen Ruby | 0 | (0) |
| 2011–2014 | Liaoning Whowin | 1 | (0) |
| 2013 | → Qingdao Hainiu (loan) | 6 | (0) |
| 2015 | Shenyang Urban | | |
| 2016 | Dalian Boyang | | |
| 2018–2019 | Shenyang Urban | 5 | (0) |
- * Club domestic league appearances and goals as of 31 December 2020

Ji Chao (Chinese: 纪超; born 1 January 1991 in Shenyang) is a Chinese footballer.

== Club career ==
In 2010, Ji Chao started his professional footballer career with Shenzhen Ruby in the Chinese Super League. In February 2011, he transferred to Chinese Super League side Liaoning Whowin. He would eventually make his league debut for Liaoning on 28 September 2012 in a game against Tianjin Teda, coming on as a substitute for Jiang Peng in the 66th minute. In February 2013, Ji moved to China League Two side Qingdao Hainiu on a one-year loan deal. Ji received a ban of half year from 22 March 2017 to 21 September 2017 by the Chinese Football Association for falsity of his registration information.

== Career statistics ==
Statistics accurate as of match played 31 December 2020.

| Club | Season | League | | | National Cup | | Continental | | Other | | Total | |
| Club | Season | Division | Apps | Goals | Apps | Goals | Apps | Goals | Apps | Goals | Apps | Goals |
|---|---|---|---|---|---|---|---|---|---|---|---|---|
| Shenzhen Ruby | 2010 | Chinese Super League | 0 | 0 | - | | - | | - | | 0 | 0 |
| Liaoning Whowin | 2011 | Chinese Super League | 0 | 0 | 0 | 0 | - | | - | | 0 | 0 |
| Liaoning Whowin | 2012 | Chinese Super League | 1 | 0 | 0 | 0 | - | | - | | 1 | 0 |
| Liaoning Whowin | 2014 | Chinese Super League | 0 | 0 | 0 | 0 | - | | - | | 0 | 0 |
| Liaoning Whowin | Total | | 1 | 0 | 0 | 0 | 0 | 0 | 0 | 0 | 1 | 0 |
| Qingdao Hainiu (loan) | 2013 | China League Two | 6 | 0 | 0 | 0 | - | | - | | 6 | 0 |
| Shenyang Urban | 2015 | CAL | - | | - | | - | | - | | - | |
| Dalian Boyang | 2016 | CAL | - | | 0 | 0 | - | | - | | 0 | 0 |
| Shenyang Urban | 2018 | China League Two | 1 | 0 | 1 | 0 | - | | - | | 2 | 0 |
| Shenyang Urban | 2019 | China League Two | 3 | 0 | 2 | 0 | - | | - | | 5 | 0 |
| Shenyang Urban | Total | | 4 | 0 | 3 | 0 | 0 | 0 | 0 | 0 | 7 | 0 |
| Career total | | | 11 | 0 | 3 | 0 | 0 | 0 | 0 | 0 | 14 | 0 |

== Honours ==
=== Club ===
Shenyang Urban

- China League Two: 2019
