= Liu Shangkun =

Chinese footballer

Liu Shangkun 刘尚坤
Personal information
- Date of birth: 29 January 1992 (age 34)
- Place of birth: Jinzhou, Liaoning, China
- Height: 1.78 m (5 ft 10 in)
- Position: Defender

Youth career
- 2007–2010: Shandong Luneng

Senior career*
Years	Team	Apps	(Gls)
2011–2012	Tianjin Songjiang	25	(0)
2013–2015	Wuhan Zall	45	(2)
2016–2019	Liaoning Whowin	51	(0)
2020–2022	Wuhan Yangtze River	10	(0)
2023	Jiangxi Lushan	7	(0)
2024	Ganzhou Ruishi	12	(0)
- * Club domestic league appearances and goals as of 31 December 2020

Liu Shangkun (Chinese: 刘尚坤; born 29 January 1992 in Jinzhou) is a Chinese former football player.

== Club career ==
Liu Shangkun joined the Shandong Luneng Football Academy in 2007 and played for their youth team until in 2011, Liu joined Tianjin Songjiang in the China League One after unsuccessful trials with Guangzhou Evergrande, Shenyang Dongjin and Hunan Billows. After two seasons with the club in November 2012, Liu transferred to Chinese Super League side Wuhan Zall. He made his Super League debut for Wuhan on 13 April 2013 in a game against Changchun Yatai, coming on as a substitute for Yao Hanlin in the 91st minute.

On 7 January 2016, Liu transferred to his hometown club Liaoning Whowin. He would make his debut on 6 March 2016 in a league game against Shijiazhuang Ever Bright F.C. that ended in a 1-0 victory. He would go on to become a regular within the team, but was also part of the squad that saw the club relegated at the end of the 2017 Chinese Super League campaign. He left the club after they were dissolved on 23 May 2020 due to wage arrears.

On 17 July 2020, Liu returned to Chinese Super League side Wuhan Zall. His return appearance would be in a league game on 12 August 2020 against Shanghai SIPG F.C. that ended in a 2-1 defeat.

== Career statistics ==
Statistics accurate as of match played 31 December 2020.

Appearances and goals by club, season and competition
Club	Season	League			National Cup		Continental		Other		Total	
Club	Season	Division	Apps	Goals	Apps	Goals	Apps	Goals	Apps	Goals	Apps	Goals
Tianjin Songjiang	2011	China League One	8	0	0	0	-		-		8	0
Tianjin Songjiang	2012	China League One	17	0	0	0	-		-		17	0
Tianjin Songjiang	Total		25	0	0	0	0	0	0	0	25	0
Wuhan Zall	2013	Chinese Super League	5	0	1	0	-		-		6	0
Wuhan Zall	2014	China League One	20	1	1	0	-		-		21	1
Wuhan Zall	2015	China League One	20	1	0	0	-		-		20	1
Wuhan Zall	Total		45	2	2	0	0	0	0	0	47	2
Liaoning Whowin	2016	Chinese Super League	19	0	1	0	-		-		20	0
Liaoning Whowin	2017	Chinese Super League	26	0	1	0	-		-		27	0
Liaoning Whowin	2018	China League One	0	0	2	0	-		-		2	0
Liaoning Whowin	2019	China League One	6	0	2	0	-		2 (Note: Appearance(s) in CL1 Relegation play-offs)	0	10	0
Liaoning Whowin	Total		51	2	6	0	0	0	2	0	59	2
Wuhan Zall	2020	Chinese Super League	2	0	1	0	-		0 (Note: Appearance(s) in CSL Relegation play-offs)	0	3	0
Career total			123	2	9	0	0	0	2	0	134	2
