= Jiang Peng =

Chinese footballer

Jiang Peng 姜鹏
Personal information
- Date of birth: March 6, 1989 (age 37)
- Place of birth: Dalian, Liaoning, China
- Height: 1.72 m (5 ft 7 1/2 in)
- Position: Midfielder

Senior career*
Years	Team	Apps	(Gls)
2010–2014	Liaoning Whowin	3	(0)
- * Club domestic league appearances and goals as of 4 November 2014

Jiang Peng (Chinese: 姜鹏; born 6 March 1989 in Dalian, Liaoning) is a Chinese football player.

== Club career ==
In 2010, Jiang Peng started his professional footballer career with Liaoning Whowin in the Chinese Super League. He would eventually make his league debut for Liaoning on 28 September 2012 in a game against Tianjin Teda.

== Club career statistics ==
Club performance			League		Cup		League Cup		Continental		Total	
Season	Club	League	Apps	Goals	Apps	Goals	Apps	Goals	Apps	Goals	Apps	Goals
China PR			League		FA Cup		CSL Cup		Asia		Total	
2010	Liaoning Whowin	Chinese Super League	0	0	-		-		-		0	0
2011	Liaoning Whowin	Chinese Super League	0	0	2	0	-		-		2	0
2012	Liaoning Whowin	Chinese Super League	1	0	0	0	-		-		1	0
2013	Liaoning Whowin	Chinese Super League	2	0	1	0	-		-		3	0
2014	Liaoning Whowin	Chinese Super League	0	0	0	0	-		-		0	0
Total	China PR		3	0	3	0	0	0	0	0	6	0

Statistics accurate as of match played 4 November 2014
