= Liu Yi (footballer, born 1988) =

Chinese association football player

Personal information
- Date of birth: 26 August 1988 (age 38)
- Place of birth: Tianjin, China
- Height: 1.80 m (5 ft 11 in)
- Positions: Centre-back; left-back

Senior career*
Years	Team	Apps	(Gls)
2009–2010	Tianjin TEDA	0	(0)
2011–2015	Shenyang Dongjin	68	(6)
2015	Harbin Yiteng	28	(0)
2016–2019	Beijing Enterprises Group	74	(3)
2019–2020	Wuhan Zall	47	(0)
2021	Heilongjiang Ice City	33	(1)
2022	Shaanxi Chang'an Athletic	7	(0)
2022	Liaoning Shenyang Urban	18	(0)
2023–2024	Yunnan Yukun	26	(0)

International career
2007–2008	China U19		

Managerial career
- 2025–2026: Yunnan Yukun (assistant)
- * Club domestic league appearances and goals as of 16:41, 28 April 2022 (UTC)

Liu Yi (simplified Chinese: 刘毅; traditional Chinese: 劉毅; pinyin: Liú Yì; born 26 August 1988) is a Chinese football coach and former footballer who played as a centre-back or left-back.

== Club career ==
Liu Yi would be promoted from the Tianjin TEDA F.C. youth team into the senior team during the 2009 league season after competing in the 2008 AFC U-19 Championship for China where they finished in the quarter-finals. On October 28, 2009 Liu Yi was suspended for one year and fined 10,000 Yuan by the Chinese Football Association for lying about his age to compete in the tournament. After his suspension finished he would join second tier club Shenyang Dongjin at the beginning of the 2011 league season.

On February 3, 2015 Liu Yi would join Harbin Yiteng for the start of the 2015 league season. After only one season Liu Yi would move to Beijing Enterprises Group on a club record fee of 20 million Yuan. After three seasons he would join top-tier club Wuhan Zall at the start of the 2019 Chinese Super League season.

On 17 January 2025, Liu was retired from professional football and became a member of Yunnan Yukun coaching team.

On 21 May 2026, Liu was given a 5-year ban for match-fixing by the Chinese Football Association.

== Career statistics ==
As of 31 December 2020.

Appearances and goals by club, season and competition
Club	Season	League			National Cup		Continental		Other		Total	
Club	Season	Division	Apps	Goals	Apps	Goals	Apps	Goals	Apps	Goals	Apps	Goals
Tianjin TEDA	2009	Chinese Super League	0	0	–		0	0	–		0	0
Tianjin TEDA	2010	Chinese Super League	0	0	–		–		–		0	0
Tianjin TEDA	Total		0	0	0	0	0	0	0	0	0	0
Shenyang Dongjin	2011	China League One	23	4	0	0	–		–		23	4
Shenyang Dongjin	2012	China League One	29	0	1	0	–		–		30	0
Shenyang Dongjin	2013	China League Two	9	1	2	0	–		–		11	1
Shenyang Dongjin	2014	China League Two	7	1	0	0	–		–		7	1
Shenyang Dongjin	Total		68	6	3	0	0	0	0	0	71	6
Harbin Yiteng	2015	China League One	28	0	0	0	–		–		28	0
Beijing Enterprises	2016	China League One	17	0	1	0	–		–		18	0
Beijing Enterprises	2017	China League One	28	2	0	0	–		–		28	2
Beijing Enterprises	2018	China League One	29	1	0	0	–		–		29	1
Beijing Enterprises	Total		74	3	1	0	0	0	0	0	75	3
Wuhan Zall	2019	Chinese Super League	27	0	0	0	–		–		27	0
Wuhan Zall	2020	Chinese Super League	18	0	2	0	–		2 (Note: Appearance(s) in CSL Relegation play-offs)	0	22	0
Wuhan Zall	Total		45	0	2	0	0	0	2	0	49	0
Career total			215	9	6	0	0	0	2	0	223	9
