= Xie Weichao =

Chinese footballer

Xie Weichao 谢维超
Personal information
- Date of birth: July 6, 1989 (age 37)
- Place of birth: Liaoning, China
- Height: 1.73 m (5 ft 8 in)
- Positions: Left winger; left-back

Team information
- Current team: Shenyang Urban
- Number: 8

Senior career*
Years	Team	Apps	(Gls)
2008–2010	Changsha Ginde	17	(0)
2011–2016	Hunan Billows	86	(2)
2017–2018	Baoding Yingli Yitong	25	(0)
2019–	Shenyang Urban	37	(0)
- * Club domestic league appearances and goals as of 31 December 2020

Xie Weichao (Chinese: 谢维超; born 6 July 1989 in Liaoning) is a Chinese football player who currently plays for China League One side Shenyang Urban.

== Club career ==
In 2008, Xie Weichao started his professional footballer career with Changsha Ginde in the Chinese Super League. He would eventually make his league debut for Changsha on 12 April 2008 in a game against Hangzhou Greentown. In February 2011, Xie transferred to China League One side Hunan Billows.

In March 2016, Xie transferred to fellow League One side Baoding Yingli Yitong. In March 2019, Xie transferred to China League Two side Shenyang Urban. He would go on to win the 2019 China League Two division with the club.

== Career statistics ==
Statistics accurate as of match played 31 December 2020.

Club	Season	League			National Cup		Continental		Other		Total	
Club	Season	Division	Apps	Goals	Apps	Goals	Apps	Goals	Apps	Goals	Apps	Goals
Changsha Ginde	2008	Chinese Super League	3	0	-		-		-		3	0
Changsha Ginde	2009	Chinese Super League	0	0	-		-		-		0	0
Changsha Ginde	2010	Chinese Super League	14	0	-		-		-		14	0
Changsha Ginde	Total		17	0	0	0	0	0	0	0	17	0
Hunan Billows	2011	China League One	12	0	1	0	-		-		13	0
Hunan Billows	2012	China League One	14	1	0	0	-		-		14	1
Hunan Billows	2013	China League One	3	0	0	0	-		-		3	0
Hunan Billows	2014	China League One	26	1	0	0	-		-		26	1
Hunan Billows	2015	China League One	13	0	1	0	-		-		14	0
Hunan Billows	2016	China League One	18	0	1	0	-		-		19	0
Hunan Billows	Total		86	2	3	0	0	0	0	0	89	2
Baoding Yingli Yitong	2017	China League One	13	0	0	0	-		-		13	0
Baoding Yingli Yitong	2018	China League Two	12	0	0	0	-		-		12	0
Baoding Yingli Yitong	Total		25	0	0	0	0	0	0	0	25	0
Shenyang Urban	2019	China League Two	22	0	1	0	-		-		23	0
Shenyang Urban	2020	China League One	15	0	-		-		-		15	0
Shenyang Urban	Total		37	0	1	0	0	0	0	0	38	0
Career total			165	2	4	0	0	0	0	0	169	2

== Honours ==
Shenyang Urban

- China League Two: 2019
