= Wang Ji (physician) =

Wang Ji (1463–1539) was a Ming physician who published an early medical casebook.

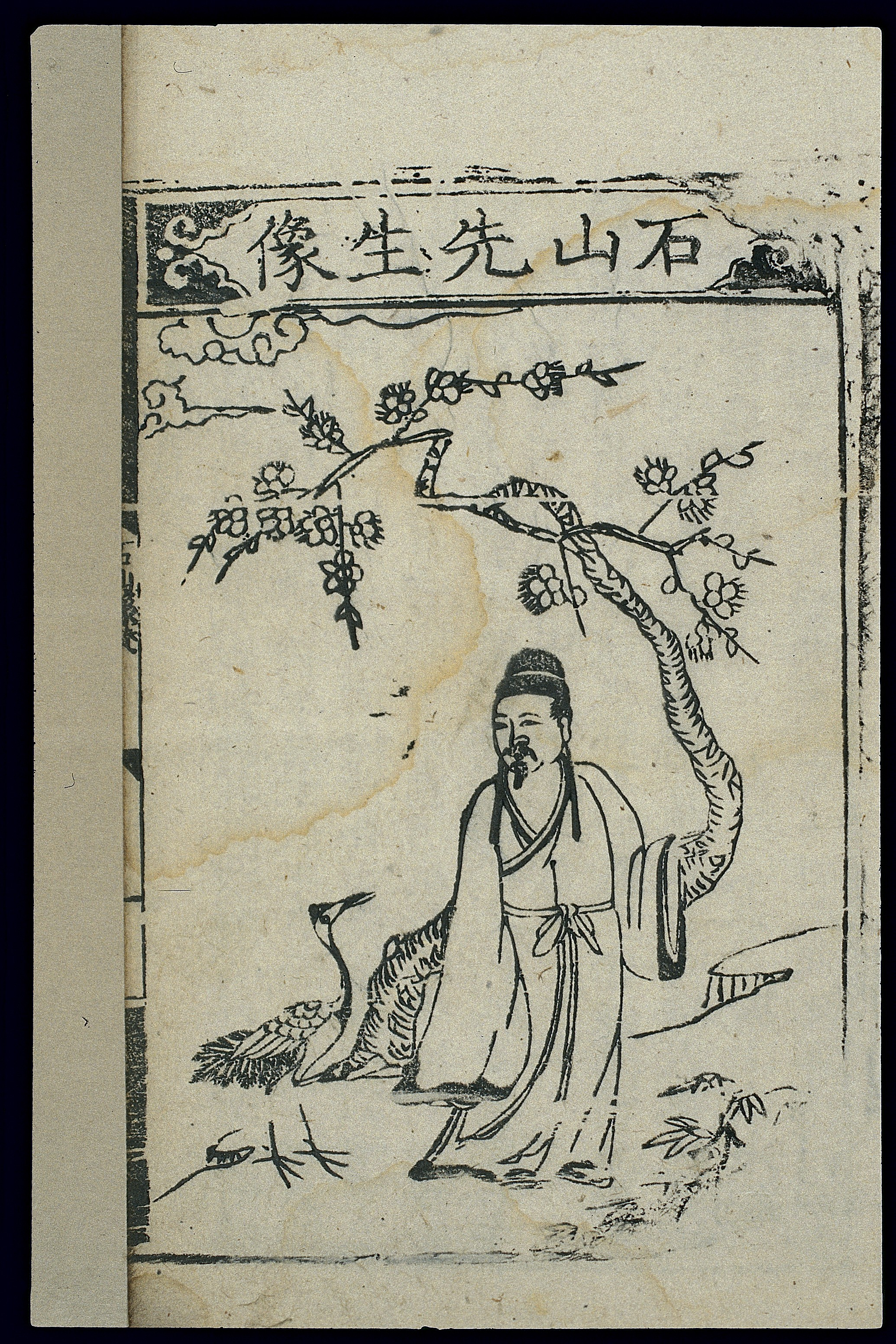

== Works ==
- Shishan yian [Stone mountain medical case histories], 1520.
- Zhenjiu Wen Dui [Acumoxa Questions and Answers], 1530
- Tui qiu shi yi [Ascertain the master’s meanings]
- Waike lili [Patterns and Examples for External Medicine]
