= Cai Shun =

Chinese footballer

Cai Shun 蔡顺
Personal information
- Date of birth: February 1, 1991 (age 35)
- Place of birth: Wuhan, Hubei, China
- Height: 1.83 m (6 ft 0 in)
- Position: Defender

Youth career
- Shandong Luneng

Senior career*
Years	Team	Apps	(Gls)
2011–2012	Hangzhou Greentown	0	(0)
2011	→ Hubei Greenery (loan)	11	(1)
2012–2014	Wuhan Zall	10	(0)
2015–2017	Hainan Seamen	20	(0)
2017–2018	Zhenjiang Huasa	20	(0)

International career
2010	China U19		

Managerial career
- 2021-2024: Wuhan Three Towns youth
- * Club domestic league appearances and goals as of 13 October 2018

Cai Shun (Chinese: 蔡顺; born 1 February 1991 in Wuhan, Hubei) is a Chinese football coach and former player.

== Club career ==
Born in Wuhan, Cai joined Shandong Luneng Football Academy. In 2011, Cai Shun started his professional footballer career with Hangzhou Greentown in the Chinese Super League. In March 2011, he moved to China League One side Hubei Greenery on a one-year loan deal.

In June 2012, Cai transferred to China League One side Wuhan Zall. He would eventually make his league debut for Wuhan on 3 November 2013 in a game against Guangzhou Evergrande, coming on as a substitute for Kang Zhenjie in the 80th minute.

In 2015, Cai signed for Hainan Seamen.

After the retirement as player, Cai started his coaching career in Wuhan Three Towns youth teams.

== Club career statistics ==
As of 13 October 2018

Club performance			League		Cup		League Cup		Continental		Total	
Season	Club	League	Apps	Goals	Apps	Goals	Apps	Goals	Apps	Goals	Apps	Goals
China PR			League		FA Cup		CSL Cup		Asia		Total	
2011	Hangzhou Greentown	Chinese Super League	0	0	0	0	-		-		0	0
2011	Hubei Greenery	China League One	11	0	1	0	-		-		12	0
2012	Hangzhou Greentown	Chinese Super League	0	0	0	0	-		-		0	0
2012	Wuhan Zall	China League One	8	0	0	0	-		-		8	0
2013	Wuhan Zall	Chinese Super League	1	0	1	0	-		-		2	0
2014	Wuhan Zall	China League One	0	0	0	0	-		-		0	0
2016	Hainan Seamen	China League Two	15	0	2	0	-		-		17	0
2017	Hainan Seamen	China League Two	5	0	0	0	-		-		5	0
2017	Zhenjiang Huasa	China League Two	11	0	0	0	-		-		11	0
2018	Zhenjiang Huasa	China League Two	9	0	0	0	-		-		9	0
Total	China PR		60	0	4	0	0	0	0	0	64	0
