= Cui Yongzhe =

Chinese footballer

Cui Yongzhe 崔永哲
Personal information
- Full name: Cui Yongzhe
- Date of birth: 8 January 1987 (age 39)
- Place of birth: Yanji, Jilin, China
- Height: 1.76 m (5 ft 9 1/2 in)
- Position: Midfielder

Senior career*
Years	Team	Apps	(Gls)
2004–2008	Yanbian Changbaishan	42	(4)
2009–2010	Anhui Jiufang	37	(4)
2011–2012	Yanbian Changbaishan	39	(2)
2013–2019	Chongqing Lifan	101	(2)
- * Club domestic league appearances and goals as of 31 December 2019

Cui Yongzhe (Chinese: 崔永哲; pinyin: Cuī Yǒngzhé; Korean: 최영철; born 8 January 1987 in Yanji) is a Chinese former footballer.

== Club career ==
Cui Yongzhe was promoted to Yanbian Changbaishan's first team squad in 2004. In February 2009, Cui transferred to China League One side Anhui Jiufang. Cui returned to Yanbian FC in January 2011.

On 21 January 2013, Cui moved to China League One side Chongqing Lifan. He made his Super League debut on 14 March 2015, in the second match of the season against Guangzhou Evergrande, coming on as a substitute for Wang Dong.

== Career statistics ==
Statistics accurate as of match played 31 December 2019.

Appearances and goals by club, season and competition
Club	Season	League			National Cup		Continental		Other		Total	
Club	Season	Division	Apps	Goals	Apps	Goals	Apps	Goals	Apps	Goals	Apps	Goals
Yanbian Changbaishan	2004	China League Two			-		-		-			
Yanbian Changbaishan	2005	China League One	1	0			-		-		1	0
Yanbian Changbaishan	2006	China League One	6	0			-		-		6	0
Yanbian Changbaishan	2007	China League One	18	2	-		-		-		18	2
Yanbian Changbaishan	2008	China League One	17	2	-		-		-		17	2
Yanbian Changbaishan	Total		42	4	0	0	0	0	0	0	42	4
Anhui Jiufang	2009	China League One	18	2	-		-		-		18	2
Anhui Jiufang	2010	China League One	19	2	-		-		-		19	2
Anhui Jiufang	Total		37	4	0	0	0	0	0	0	37	4
Yanbian Changbaishan	2011	China League One	14	0	0	0	-		-		14	0
Yanbian Changbaishan	2012	China League One	25	2	1	0	-		-		26	2
Yanbian Changbaishan	Total		39	2	1	0	0	0	0	0	40	2
Chongqing Lifan	2013	China League One	25	1	0	0	-		-		25	1
Chongqing Lifan	2014	China League One	25	1	1	0	-		-		26	1
Chongqing Lifan	2015	Chinese Super League	19	0	1	0	-		-		20	0
Chongqing Lifan	2016	Chinese Super League	4	0	1	0	-		-		5	0
Chongqing Lifan	2017	Chinese Super League	13	0	0	0	-		-		13	0
Chongqing Lifan	2018	Chinese Super League	15	0	0	0	-		-		15	0
Chongqing Lifan	Total		101	2	3	0	0	0	0	0	104	2
Career total			199	12	4	0	0	0	0	0	223	12

== Honours ==
=== Club ===
Chongqing Lifan

- China League One: 2014
