= Rodrigo Silva (footballer, born 1982) =

Brazilian footballer

Personal information
- Full name: Rodrigo Gonçalves de Oliveira Lopes Silva
- Date of birth: 16 November 1982 (age 43)
- Place of birth: São Paulo, Brazil
- Height: 1.86 m (6 ft 1 in)
- Position: Forward

Team information
- Current team: Customs United
- Number: 9

Youth career
- Rio Branco PR

Senior career*
Years	Team	Apps	(Gls)
2001–2004	Rio Branco PR		
2005	Sandefjord	10	(0)
2006	Rio Branco PR		
2007	Juventus (SC)		
2007	Rio Branco PR		
2008	KÍ Klaksvík		
2009	Standard Sumgayit	15	(3)
2009–2010	Nea Salamis	13	(3)
2010	SD Huesca	9	(0)
2010	Shanghai East Asia	7	(1)
2011–2013	Deportes Savio	8	(0)
2014	KÍ Klaksvík	17	(4)
2015–2016	Ang Thong		
2017	Ubon Ratchathani		
2017–	Customs United		
- * Club domestic league appearances and goals

Rodrigo Gonçalves de Oliveira Lopes Silva (born November 16, 1982, in São Paulo) is a Brazilian football forward who currently plays for Customs United in the Thai League 3 Lower region. He previously played professionally in the Segunda División for SD Huesca.

== Career ==
He began his career in Rio Branco PR. Later, in the 2005/2006 season, Silva emigrated first to the European continent to enlist in the ranks of Sandefjord of Norway.

Silva returned to Brazil to join Guarulhos Esporte before joining in KÍ Klaksvík of the Faroe Islands. Then, he went to Azerbaijan to play in Standard Sumgayit.

In the 2009/2010 season, Silva moved to Nea Salamis in Cyprus. On 3 March 2010, he signed a contract with SD Huesca until the end of the season, and an option to stay one more year.

In July 2010, he moved to Shanghai East Asia.

== Career statistics ==
=== Club ===
As of match played 20 August 2014

Appearances and goals by club, season and competition
Club	Season	League			National Cup		Continental		Other		Total	
Club	Season	Division	Apps	Goals	Apps	Goals	Apps	Goals	Apps	Goals	Apps	Goals
Standard Baku	2008-09	Azerbaijan Premier League	13	3			–		–		13	3
Standard Baku	2009-10	Azerbaijan Premier League	2	0			–		–		2	0
Standard Baku	Total		15	3			-	-	-	-	15	3
Deportes Savio	2012–13	Liga Nacional Honduras	8	0	–		–		–		8	0
KÍ Klaksvík	2015	Effodeildin	17	4	1	0	–		–		18	4
Career total			40	7	1	0	-	-	-	-	41	7
