= Li Haoyuan =

Chinese footballer

Li Haoyuan 李昊原
Personal information
- Full name: Li Haoyuan
- Date of birth: April 10, 1989 (age 37)
- Place of birth: Taiyuan, Shanxi, China
- Height: 1.79 m (5 ft 10 1/2 in)
- Position: Midfielder

Youth career
- 2000–2003: Bayi football School
- 2003–2005: Tianjin Hongqiao
- 2005–2007: Tianjin Teda
- 2008: NK Žepče

Senior career*
Years	Team	Apps	(Gls)
2009–2010	NK Žepče	9	(2)
2010–2011	Shenzhen Ruby	0	(0)
2010–2011	→ Persiwa Wamena (loan)	11	(2)
2012	Jiangxi Liansheng	1	(0)
- * Club domestic league appearances and goals

Li Haoyuan (Chinese: 李昊原; pinyin: Lǐ Hàoyuán, born 10 April 1989) is a Chinese former footballer who played as a Midfielder.

Haoyuan was born in Taiyuan, Shanxi, China. He played for Bayi football school for three years from 2000. He later played for the youth teams of Tianjin Hongqiao, Tianjin Teda and NK Zepce. As a senior player, he played for NK Zepce, Shenzen FC, Persiwa Wamena on loan and Jiangxi Liansheng.
