= Lee Yoon-sub =

South Korean footballer (born 1979)

Lee Yoon-Sub
Personal information
- Full name: Lee Yoon-Sub
- Date of birth: 30 July 1979 (age 47)
- Place of birth: Chungcheongbuk-do, South Korea
- Height: 1.84 m (6 ft 0 in)
- Positions: Defender; defensive midfielder

Senior career*
Years	Team	Apps	(Gls)
2002–2008	Ulsan Hyundai	12	(0)
2006–2007	→ Gwangju Sangmu (army)	20	(1)
2010	Qingdao Jonoon	18	(1)
2011	Shenyang Dongjin	8	(0)
2012	Daejeon KHNP	3	(0)
2012	Ulsan Hyundai Mipo	6	(0)
- * Club domestic league appearances and goals as of 26 July 2012

- Lee Yoon-sub
- Hangul: 이윤섭
- Hanja: 李允燮
- RR: I Yunseop
- MR: I Yunsŏp

Lee Yoon-Sub (Korean: 이윤섭; born 30 July 1979) is a South Korean football player.
