= Yang Yun (footballer, born 1988) =

Chinese footballer

Yang Yun 杨云
Personal information
- Date of birth: 6 October 1988 (age 38)
- Place of birth: Shanghai, China
- Height: 1.84 m (6 ft 1/2 in)
- Position: Defender

Team information
- Current team: Shijiazhuang Gongfu
- Number: 36

Youth career
- 2003–2007: Shanghai Shenhua
- 2007: Liaoning Guangyuan

Senior career*
| Years | Team | Apps | (Gls) |
| 2008–2010 | Shanghai Shenhua | 0 | (0) |
| 2009–2010 | → Nanchang Bayi (loan) | 36 | (2) |
| 2011–2016 | Chongqing Lifan | 104 | (3) |
| 2017–2018 | Qingdao Huanghai | 55 | (2) |
| 2019–2024 | Cangzhou Mighty Lions | 115 | (2) |
| 2025– | Shijiazhuang Gongfu | 29 | (1) |
- * Club domestic league appearances and goals as of 9 March 2026

Yang Yun (Chinese: 杨云; born 6 October 1988) is a Chinese professional footballer who currently plays as a defender for Shijiazhuang Gongfu.

== Club career ==
Born in Shanghai, Yang Yun originally began his football career playing for the Shanghai Shenhua youth team, however he was unable to break into their senior team due to the merger with Shanghai United F.C. and the significant increase in the squad size. Almost leaving the club he would instead be loaned out to Singapore side Liaoning Guangyuan FC to gain more playing opportunities. When he returned he would finally be promoted to the senior side and would go on to be scouted by Juventus FC before agreeing a loan move to second tier club Nanchang Bayi halfway through the 2009 league season. Yang's move turned out to be a huge success and he helped guide the team to a runners-up position and promotion to the top tier.

Yang Yun transferred to China League One club Chongqing Lifan in February 2011. On 5 January 2017, Yang moved to League One side Qingdao Huanghai. He joined fellow China League One side Shijiazhuang Ever Bright (now named Cangzhou Mighty Lions F.C.) on 22 February 2019. In his first season with the club he would help the team to a runners-up position and promotion into the top tier.

== Career statistics ==
Statistics accurate as of match played 31 January 2023.

Appearances and goals by club, season and competition
| Club | Season | League | | | National Cup | | Continental | | Other | | Total | |
| Club | Season | Division | Apps | Goals | Apps | Goals | Apps | Goals | Apps | Goals | Apps | Goals |
|---|---|---|---|---|---|---|---|---|---|---|---|---|
| Shanghai Shenhua | 2008 | Chinese Super League | 0 | 0 | - | | - | | - | | 0 | 0 |
| Nanchang Bayi (Loan) | 2009 | China League One | 11 | 2 | - | | - | | - | | 11 | 2 |
| Nanchang Bayi (Loan) | 2010 | Chinese Super League | 25 | 0 | - | | - | | - | | 25 | 0 |
| Nanchang Bayi (Loan) | Total | | 36 | 2 | 0 | 0 | 0 | 0 | 0 | 0 | 36 | 2 |
| Chongqing Lifan | 2011 | China League One | 22 | 1 | 0 | 0 | - | | - | | 22 | 1 |
| Chongqing Lifan | 2012 | China League One | 27 | 1 | 0 | 0 | - | | - | | 27 | 1 |
| Chongqing Lifan | 2013 | China League One | 28 | 0 | 0 | 0 | - | | - | | 28 | 0 |
| Chongqing Lifan | 2014 | China League One | 23 | 1 | 1 | 0 | - | | - | | 24 | 1 |
| Chongqing Lifan | 2015 | Chinese Super League | 3 | 0 | 2 | 0 | - | | - | | 5 | 0 |
| Chongqing Lifan | 2016 | Chinese Super League | 1 | 0 | 1 | 0 | - | | - | | 2 | 0 |
| Chongqing Lifan | Total | | 104 | 3 | 4 | 0 | 0 | 0 | 0 | 0 | 108 | 3 |
| Qingdao Huanghai | 2017 | China League One | 27 | 1 | 1 | 0 | - | | - | | 28 | 1 |
| Qingdao Huanghai | 2018 | China League One | 28 | 1 | 0 | 0 | - | | - | | 28 | 1 |
| Qingdao Huanghai | Total | | 55 | 2 | 1 | 0 | 0 | 0 | 0 | 0 | 56 | 2 |
| Shijiazhuang Ever Bright/ Cangzhou Mighty Lions F.C. | 2019 | China League One | 19 | 1 | 2 | 0 | - | | - | | 21 | 1 |
| Shijiazhuang Ever Bright/ Cangzhou Mighty Lions F.C. | 2020 | Chinese Super League | 12 | 0 | 1 | 0 | - | | - | | 13 | 0 |
| Shijiazhuang Ever Bright/ Cangzhou Mighty Lions F.C. | 2021 | Chinese Super League | 12 | 1 | 0 | 0 | - | | - | | 12 | 1 |
| Shijiazhuang Ever Bright/ Cangzhou Mighty Lions F.C. | 2022 | Chinese Super League | 25 | 0 | 1 | 0 | - | | - | | 26 | 0 |
| Shijiazhuang Ever Bright/ Cangzhou Mighty Lions F.C. | Total | | 68 | 2 | 4 | 0 | 0 | 0 | 0 | 0 | 72 | 2 |
| Career total | | | 263 | 9 | 9 | 0 | 0 | 0 | 0 | 0 | 272 | 9 |

== Honours ==
=== Club ===
Chongqing Lifan

- China League One: 2014
