= Tang Jing (footballer) =

Chinese footballer

Tang Jing 唐京
Personal information
- Date of birth: 14 February 1975 (age 51)
- Place of birth: Beijing, China
- Height: 1.91 m (6 ft 3 in)
- Position: Defender

Senior career*
Years	Team	Apps	(Gls)
1996–2002	Jiangsu Sainty	49	(3)
2003–2005	Sichuan Quanxing	62	(2)
2006–2010	Changchun Yatai	73	(4)
2010–2011	Jiangsu Sainty	1	(0)

Managerial career
- 2012–2017: Jiangsu Suning (assistant)
- 2016: Jiangsu Suning (caretaker)
- 2018: Zhenjiang Huasa
- 2019–2020: Hunan Billows
- 2020–2021: Jiangsu Yancheng Dingli
- 2021-2023: Ji'nan Xingzhou
- * Club domestic league appearances and goals as of 5 November 2012

Tang Jing (Chinese: 唐京; born 14 February 1975 in Beijing) is a former professional Chinese footballer who played as a defender for Jiangsu Sainty, Sichuan Quanxing and Changchun Yatai where he won the 2007 Chinese Super League title with the latter.

== Club career ==
=== Sichuan Quanxing ===
Tang Jing would start his football career with lower league side Jiangsu Sainty and would see them win the third tier title and promotion into the second tier. After spending several seasons establishing himself within the team he would attract the interests of top tier side Sichuan Quanxing, who would sign him at the start of the 2003 league season. He would immediately establish himself within the heart of the team's defence where his height and heading ability would quickly be utilized. For the next several seasons he would be a firm regular within the side and often guided the club to several mid-table positions, however after several years of service the club would disband at the end of the 2005 league season and he was free to leave the club.

=== Changchun Yatai ===
At the beginning of the 2006 league season Tang Jing would move to the newly promoted side Changchun Yatai and would immediately become an integral member of the team where his experience and composure saw the team surprise many by coming fourth within the league. The following season Tang Jing would go a step further and aid Changchun to their first ever league title at the end of the 2007 league season. After several further seasons with the club Tang would play a more diminishing role within the team and due to his age he was allowed to leave the club. Despite already being thirty-five years old, Tang would rejoin his first club Jiangsu Sainty on a loan basis during the 2010 league season before making the move permanent later on.
