= Cheng Liang =

Chinese footballer

Cheng Liang 成亮
Personal information
- Date of birth: 3 March 1977 (age 49)
- Place of birth: Shanghai, China
- Height: 1.88 m (6 ft 2 in)
- Position: Left-back

Youth career
- 1995–1997: Shanghai Shenhua

Senior career*
Years	Team	Apps	(Gls)
1998–2004	Shanghai Pudong	88	(7)
2005–2012	Shanghai Shenhua	101	(8)
2010	→ Shenzhen Ruby	6	(0)
2016–2017	Shanghai Sunfun	0	(0)

International career
2009	China	5	(0)

Managerial career
- 2016–2017: Shanghai Sunfun
- 2018: Sichuan Jiuniu
- 2019: Yunnan Kunlu
- 2020–2022: Qingdao FC (assistant)
- 2021–2022: China Women (assistant)
- 2026: Shanxi Chongde Ronghai
- * Club domestic league appearances and goals

Cheng Liang (Chinese: 成亮; pinyin: Chéng Liàng; born 3 March 1977) is a Chinese football coach and former footballer who played as a defender for Shanghai Pudong, Shanghai Shenhua and Shenzhen Ruby. He made five appearances for the China national team.

== Club career ==
=== Shanghai Pudong ===
Cheng was born in Shanghai. Originally starting his football career with the Shanghai Shenhua youth team, he found it difficult to break into the senior team where he was considered too weak and not fast enough to compete in the top tier. Leaving Shanghai Shenhua in 1997, Cheng instead joined second tier club Shanghai Pudong and eventually started his professional football career in the 1998 league season. After playing for Shanghai Pudong for several seasons he was part of the squad that won promotion to the top tier. After establishing his club as top tier regulars Cheng was part of the squad that came runners-up within the 2003 league season and soon saw him transfer back to top tier side Shanghai Shenhua at the beginning of the 2005 league season for 3 million yuan.

=== Shanghai Shenhua ===
In the 2005 league season, Cheng made his debut for Shanghai Shenhua against Qingdao Zhongneng on 2 April 2005 in a 2–0 win. He however found his time limited at left-back due to Sun Xiang being the first choice left back within the team. Cheng nevertheless established himself within the team because of his versatility to also play as a centre-back. From the beginning of the 2009 season, he took the captaincy and on 16 April, the club announced that he will also assume the role of assistant manager. His role as an assistant did not last long and when Miroslav Blažević came in to manage the club at the beginning of the 2010 Chinese Super League season he brought his own assistants and during the summer transfer window Cheng was allowed to join Shenzhen Ruby on loan for the rest of the season as a player. When Cheng returned from his loan period he saw his playing time significantly reduced due to injury and his age limiting him to a single game throughout the season against Qingdao Jonoon on 3 November 2012 in the last league game of the season where Shenhua won 3–0 before he announced his retirement.

== Coaching career ==
On 2 February 2026, Cheng was named as the head coach of China League Two club Shanxi Chongde Ronghai. On 7 April 2026, Cheng left his position due to family issue.

== International career ==
Despite already being 32 years old Cheng was to make his international debut against Germany on 29 May 2009, in an impressive 1-1 friendly that saw him play as a centre-back. He continued to play as a centre-back for China's following friendly against Saudi Arabia on 4 June 2009 where China lost 4–1. Despite the defeat Cheng continued to be included in several further squads to add experience towards the team.
