= Chen Yongqiang (footballer) =

Chinese football player

Chen Yongqiang 陈永强
Personal information
- Date of birth: November 1, 1978 (age 47)
- Place of birth: Dalian, Liaoning, China
- Height: 1.78 m (5 ft 10 in)
- Positions: Defensive midfielder; defender

Youth career
- 1994–1997: Bayi Football Team

Senior career*
Years	Team	Apps	(Gls)
1998	Bayi	0	(0)
2000–2009	Shenzhen Ping'an Kejian	146	(2)
2010	Shanghai Shenhua	18	(0)
2011	Shenyang Shenbei	22	(0)
2012	Shenzhen Fengpeng	22	(0)
2015–2016	Shenzhen Renren	0	(0)

International career
2005	China	2	(0)
- * Club domestic league appearances and goals as of 25 July 2016

Chen Yongqiang (simplified Chinese: 陈永强; traditional Chinese: 陳永強; pinyin: Chén Yǒngqiáng; born November 1, 1978, in Dalian, Liaoning) is a Chinese former professional football player.

== Club career ==
Originally starting his career for Bayi Football Team he could not break into the squad and found it difficult to join another team until Shenzhen Ping'an Kejian took him on in October 1999 to begin his professional football career. He would go on to make debut during the 2000 league season and go to make ten league appearances, scoring one goal during the season. With his good physical presence and excellent composure he would firmly establish himself within the Shenzhen team and become their main defensive midfielder within the team. By the 2004 league season his consistency would be rewarded when he helped Shenzhen win the inaugural Chinese Super League title.

After this success he would receive his first international call-up, however on June 11, 2005, he was severely attacked at a restaurant on a night out with his wife and her family, with his injuries he would miss much of the 2005 league season. When he returned to Shenzhen he found that the club had changed significantly with many of his influential team mates leaving due to the financial problems at the club while Chen remained with team for the next several seasons to help them fight off relegation. With several managers coming in fight off relegation Chen found himself slipping down the pecking order within the team with the 2009 league season being the difficult period for Chen after he fell out of favour within the team and only played a small part within the campaign. When the season ended the club decided not to renew his contract, however he was recommended to Shanghai Shenhua where despite being over 31 years old and one of the oldest players within the squad he would still quickly establish himself as regular within the team. While he gained significant playing time out of position within defence at the start of the season, his importance within the team would dwindle throughout the season and Chen was allowed to leave for second tier football club Tianjin Runyulong at the beginning of the 2011 league season.

== International career ==
Chen Yongqiang's former Shenzhen manager Zhu Guanghu would include him in his first squad to play against Spain in a friendly on March 26, 2005, that China lost 3–0. This was followed by another friendly against Republic of Ireland on March 29, 2005, in another friendly game that China lost 1–0. Due to his injuries he experienced after his restaurant attack he missed several months out of football and would lose his place within the team.

== Honours ==
Shenzhen

- Chinese Super League: 2004
