= Yu Rui (footballer) =

Chinese footballer

Yu Rui 于睿
Personal information
- Date of birth: 11 August 1992 (age 34)
- Place of birth: Benxi, Liaoning, China
- Height: 1.85 m (6 ft 1 in)
- Position: Defender

Team information
- Current team: Shenzhen Peng City
- Number: 15

Youth career
- 2008: Xiamen Lanshi
- 2008: Chengdu Blades

Senior career*
| Years | Team | Apps | (Gls) |
| 2009–2010 | Chengdu Blades | 0 | (0) |
| 2008–2009 | → Sheffield United HK (loan) | 10 | (0) |
| 2009 | → Fourway Rangers (loan) | 0 | (0) |
| 2010 | → Tianjin Songjiang (loan) | 18 | (0) |
| 2011–2012 | Tianjin Songjiang | 35 | (1) |
| 2013–2016 | Beijing Renhe | 33 | (1) |
| 2013 | → Hebei Zhongji (loan) | 11 | (1) |
| 2017–2020 | Changchun Yatai | 54 | (8) |
| 2020–2023 | Shanghai SIPG | 7 | (0) |
| 2022 | → Kunshan FC (loan) | 30 | (0) |
| 2023– | Shenzhen Peng City | 78 | (2) |

International career
| 2007–2008 | China U17 | | |
- * Club domestic league appearances and goals as of 22 November 2026

Yu Rui (Chinese: 于睿; pinyin: Yú Ruì; born 11 August 1992) is a Chinese professional footballer who plays as a defender for Chinese Super League club Shenzhen Peng City.

== Club career ==
Yu Rui would play for the Xiamen Lanshi youth team until they were disbanded in 2008, before joining Chengdu Blades youth team. At Chengdu Blades he was loaned out to their satellite team Sheffield United (Hong Kong) who were allowed to play in the 2008–09 Hong Kong First Division League. He made his debut in a league game on 25 October 2008 4–1 victory against Mutual. At the end of his loan period Yu Rui was promoted to the senior team of his parent club, however it was decided that he should get game time and he was once again loaned out to another Hong Kong club in Fourway Rangers and then a third tier Chinese club in Tianjin Songjiang. At Tianjin Songjiang he quickly established himself within the team and went on to win promotion with the side in the 2010 league season by gaining a runners-up spot within the league.

In the second tier, Yu would help establish Tianjin Songjiang within the division and by the 2012 China League One season was given the captaincy. With his contract nearing its end, Yu transferred to Chinese Super League side Guizhou Renhe with a free transfer on 28 December 2012. Within the top tier, Yu struggled to gain any playing time and 27 July 2013, he was loaned to China League Two side Hebei Zhongji until 31 December 2013. His loan period would see him immediately establish himself within the team and win promotion with the club by coming runners-up within the division. Yu would return from his loan period and go on to make his debut for Guizhou Renhe on 22 April 2014 in an AFC Champions League group stage game against Western Sydney Wanderers FC that ended in a 5–0 defeat.

On 16 December 2016, Yu moved to Super League side Changchun Yatai. He would make his debut for the club on 2 April 2017 in a league game against Shandong Luneng Taishan F.C. in a 2–0 defeat. After the game he would eventually start to establish himself within the team and go on to score his first goal for the club on 15 September 2017 in a league game against Tianjin TEDA F.C. that ended in 5–1 victory. The following season would see Yu established as a regular within the team, however despite this he was part of the squad that was relegated at the end of the 2018 Chinese Super League season. While he remained with the club for another season on 23 January 2020, Yu transferred to Super League side Shanghai SIPG for 20 million Yuan. He would utilized very sparingly at Shanghai and was loaned out to second-tier club Kunshan FC where he would go on to establish himself as a vital member within the team that won the division as well as promotion to the top tier at the end of the 2022 China League One campaign.

== Career statistics ==
Statistics accurate as of match played 25 December 2022.

Appearances and goals by club, season and competition
| Club | Season | League | | | National Cup | | League Cup | | Continental | | Other | | Total | |
| Club | Season | Division | Apps | Goals | Apps | Goals | Apps | Goals | Apps | Goals | Apps | Goals | Apps | Goals |
|---|---|---|---|---|---|---|---|---|---|---|---|---|---|---|
| Chengdu Blades | 2009 | Chinese Super League | 0 | 0 | - | | - | | - | | - | | 0 | 0 |
| Sheffield United HK (loan) | 2008–09 | Hong Kong First Division League | 10 | 0 | 2 | 0 | 1 | 0 | - | | 2 (Note: Appearances in Hong Kong Senior Challenge Shield) | 0 | 15 | 0 |
| Fourway Rangers (loan) | 2009–10 | Hong Kong First Division League | 0 | 0 | 0 | 0 | 0 | 0 | - | | 0 | 0 | 0 | 0 |
| Tianjin Songjiang (loan) | 2010 | China League Two | 18 | 0 | - | | - | | - | | - | | 18 | 0 |
| Tianjin Songjiang | 2011 | China League One | 23 | 1 | 2 | 0 | - | | - | | - | | 25 | 1 |
| Tianjin Songjiang | 2012 | China League One | 12 | 0 | 1 | 0 | - | | - | | - | | 13 | 0 |
| Tianjin Songjiang | Total | | 35 | 1 | 3 | 0 | 0 | 0 | 0 | 0 | 0 | 0 | 38 | 1 |
| Guizhou Renhe | 2013 | Chinese Super League | 0 | 0 | 0 | 0 | - | | 0 | 0 | - | | 0 | 0 |
| Guizhou Renhe | 2014 | Chinese Super League | 3 | 0 | 0 | 0 | - | | 1 | 0 | - | | 4 | 0 |
| Guizhou Renhe | 2015 | Chinese Super League | 20 | 0 | 2 | 0 | - | | - | | - | | 22 | 0 |
| Guizhou Renhe | 2016 | China League One | 10 | 1 | 2 | 0 | - | | - | | - | | 12 | 1 |
| Guizhou Renhe | Total | | 33 | 1 | 4 | 0 | 0 | 0 | 1 | 0 | 0 | 0 | 38 | 1 |
| Hebei Zhongji (loan) | 2013 | China League Two | 11 | 1 | 0 | 0 | - | | - | | - | | 11 | 1 |
| Changchun Yatai | 2017 | Chinese Super League | 18 | 3 | 1 | 0 | - | | - | | - | | 19 | 3 |
| Changchun Yatai | 2018 | Chinese Super League | 17 | 3 | 0 | 0 | - | | - | | - | | 17 | 3 |
| Changchun Yatai | 2019 | China League One | 21 | 2 | 0 | 0 | - | | - | | - | | 21 | 2 |
| Changchun Yatai | Total | | 56 | 8 | 1 | 0 | 0 | 0 | 0 | 0 | 0 | 0 | 57 | 8 |
| Shanghai SIPG | 2020 | Chinese Super League | 5 | 0 | 0 | 0 | - | | 5 | 0 | - | | 10 | 0 |
| Shanghai SIPG | 2021 | Chinese Super League | 2 | 0 | 3 | 0 | - | | 0 | 0 | - | | 5 | 0 |
| Shanghai SIPG | Total | | 7 | 0 | 3 | 0 | 0 | 0 | 5 | 0 | 0 | 0 | 15 | 0 |
| Kunshan FC (loan) | 2022 | China League One | 30 | 0 | 1 | 0 | - | | - | | - | | 31 | 0 |
| Career total | | | 200 | 11 | 14 | 0 | 1 | 0 | 6 | 0 | 2 | 0 | 223 | 11 |

== Honours ==
=== Club ===
Kunshan FC

- China League One: 2022
