= Jiang Xiaoyu =

Chinese association football player

Personal information
- Date of birth: 11 June 1989 (age 37)
- Height: 1.78 m (5 ft 10 in)
- Position: Midfielder

Senior career*
Years	Team	Apps	(Gls)
2008–2010	Chengdu Blades	8	(0)
2010	→ Shenyang Dongjin (loan)		
- Shenyang Dongjin
2015	Shenyang Weishi		
2016–2018	Shenyang Urban	37	(2)
2019–	Xi'an UKD		
- * Club domestic league appearances and goals

Jiang Xiaoyu (simplified Chinese: 姜骁宇; traditional Chinese: 姜驍宇; pinyin: Jiāng Xiāoyǔ; born 11 June 1989) is a Chinese footballer.

== Career statistics ==
=== Club ===
Club	Season	League			Cup		Other		Total	
Club	Season	Division	Apps	Goals	Apps	Goals	Apps	Goals	Apps	Goals
Chengdu Blades	2009	Chinese Super League	8	0	0	0	0	0	8	0
Chengdu Blades	2010	Chinese Super League	0	0	0	0	0	0	0	0
Chengdu Blades	Total		2	0	0	0	0	0	2	0
Shenyang Urban	2016	China League Two	16	1	2 (Note: Appearances in the Chinese FA Cup)	0	1 (Note: Appearances in the China League Two playoffs)	0	19	1
Shenyang Urban	2017	China League Two	21	1	0	0	2	0	23	1
Shenyang Urban	2018	China League Two	0	0	2	0	0	0	2	0
Shenyang Urban	Total		37	2	4	0	3	0	44	2
Career total			2	0	0	0	0	0	2	0
