= Welton Felipe (footballer, born 1986) =

Brazilian footballer

Personal information
- Full name: Welton Felipe Marcos Soares
- Date of birth: June 15, 1986 (age 40)
- Place of birth: Belo Horizonte, Brazil
- Height: 1.94 m (6 ft 4 in)
- Position: Central defender

Team information
- Current team: Mirassol

Youth career
- 2005–2006: Atlético Mineiro

Senior career*
Years	Team	Apps	(Gls)
2006–2012	Atlético Mineiro	32	(0)
2007	→ Vitória (loan)		
2008	→ Ituiutaba (loan)		
2010	→ Atlético Goianiense (loan)	18	(0)
2011	→ Changchun Yatai (loan)		
2011	→ Avaí (loan)	14	(0)
2012	→ Boa Esporte (loan)	11	(1)
2013–	Mirassol		
- * Club domestic league appearances and goals

Welton Felipe Marcos Soares (born June 15, 1986) is a Brazilian central defender who currently plays for Mirassol.

Welton Felipe began his professional career with Clube Atlético Mineiro. In 2012, he was loaned to Boa Esporte Clube where he played in Campeonato Brasileiro Série B.
