= Mu Yongjie =

Chinese footballer (born 1989)

Mu Yongjie 牟永杰
Personal information
- Full name: Mu Yongjie
- Date of birth: November 6, 1989 (age 36)
- Place of birth: Shenyang, Liaoning, China
- Height: 1.78 m (5 ft 10 in)
- Position: Midfielder

Youth career
- Changsha Ginde

Senior career*
Years	Team	Apps	(Gls)
2008–2010	Changsha Ginde	10	(0)
2010–2011	Sriwijaya FC	11	(0)
2011–2014	Shenyang Dongjin	38	(3)
2014–2015	Yinchuan Helanshan	33	(4)
2016	Shenyang Dongjin	8	(1)
- * Club domestic league appearances and goals as of 17 September 2016

Mu Yongjie (simplified Chinese: 牟永杰; traditional Chinese: 牟永傑; pinyin: Mù Yǒngjié; Korean: 모영걸; born on November 6, 1989) is a Chinese former footballer who played as midfielder.
