= Matías Villavicencio =

Argentine footballer

Personal information
- Full name: Matías Sebastián Villavicencio
- Date of birth: 18 September 1981 (age 45)
- Place of birth: Buenos Aires, Argentina
- Height: 1.80 m (5 ft 11 in)
- Position: Defender

Team information
- Current team: Central Córdoba (interim)

Senior career*
Years	Team	Apps	(Gls)
2001–2004	Independiente	29	(0)
2004–2005	Huracán	18	(2)
2005–2008	Olimpo	73	(3)
2008–2009	San Martín de Tucumán	29	(1)
2009–2010	Atlético Tucumán	24	(0)
2010	Shanghai Shenhua	2	(0)
2011	Ferro Carril Oeste	10	(0)
2011–2012	Central Norte	31	(2)
2012–2013	Olimpo	4	(0)
2013–2014	Deportivo Morón	8	(0)
2014–2015	Textil Mandiyú	13	(0)
2015–2016	San Martín de Tucumán	16	(0)
2016	Gimnasia Mendoza	11	(0)
2016–2017	Gimnasia y Tiro	16	(1)
2017–2018	Argentino de Quilmes	37	(1)
2018–2019	Berazategui	33	(1)

Managerial career
- 2020: Independiente (assistant)
- 2022–2023: Atlético Tucumán (assistant)
- 2023: Tigre (assistant)
- 2025: Atlético Tucumán (assistant)
- 2026–: Central Córdoba (assistant)
- 2026–: Central Córdoba (interim)
- * Club domestic league appearances and goals

Matías Sebastián Villavicencio (born 18 September 1981 in Buenos Aires) is an Argentine football manager and former player who played as a defender. He is the current interim manager of Central Córdoba.

Villavicencio made his professional debut on 7 December 2001 in a 1–0 victory over Nueva Chicago. In 2002, he was part of the squad that won the Apertura 2002 championship.

In 2004 Villavicencio joined Huracán of the 2nd division. The following year he returned to the Primera when he joined Olimpo de Bahía Blanca the club were relegated in 2006 but they won promotion by winning the Apertura 2006 and Clausura 2007 back to back.

In 2008 after his second relegation with Olimpo he joined newly promoted San Martín de Tucumán who were relegated at the end of the season. Villavicencio again left the relegated team to join another newly promoted club, this time San Martín's local rivals Atlético Tucumán.

On July 29, 2010, Villavicencio signed a 1-year contract with Chinese Super League side Shanghai Shenhua F.C.

== Titles ==
Season	Team	Title
Apertura 2002	Club Atlético Independiente	Primera División Argentina
Apertura 2006	Olimpo de Bahía Blanca	Primera B Nacional
Clausura 2007	Olimpo de Bahía Blanca	Primera B Nacional
