= Bruno Šiklić =

Croatian footballer

Personal information
- Full name: Bruno Šiklić
- Date of birth: 14 March 1983 (age 43)
- Place of birth: Zagreb, Croatia
- Height: 1.88 m (6 ft 2 in)
- Position: Defender

Senior career*
Years	Team	Apps	(Gls)
2000–2001	Dinamo Zagreb		
2001–2003	Lokomotiva		
2003–2004	Slaven Belupo		
2004–2005	Segesta		
2005–2008	Vihren Sandanski	25	(0)
2008–2010	Zadar	24	(0)
2010	Chongqing Lifan	18	(0)
2011	Wuhan Zall	19	(0)
2012–2013	Manama Club	13	(1)

Managerial career
- 2017–2018: Qadsia SC (assistant)
- 2018–2019: Al-Seeb
- 2019–2020: Fanja SC
- 2020–2021: Burgan SC
- 2022: Al-Nasr Club
- 2024: Sohar SC
- 2024–: Sohar SC
- * Club domestic league appearances and goals

Bruno Šiklić (born 14 March 1983) is a Croatian former professional footballer.

== Club career ==
Šiklić used to play for Dinamo Zagreb, Lokomotiva, Slaven Belupo, HNK Segesta and Zadar in Croatia and PFC Vihren in Bulgaria.

He transferred to Chongqing Lifan in July 2010.
