= Aluspah Brewah =

Swedish footballer

Personal information
- Full name: Aluspah Brewah
- Date of birth: August 24, 1983 (age 43)
- Place of birth: Freetown, Sierra Leone
- Height: 1.77 m (5 ft 10 in)
- Position: Forward

Senior career*
| Years | Team | Apps | (Gls) |
| 1998–2001 | Ashanti Gold SC | 27 | (16) |
| 2001 | Royal Antwerp FC | 4 | (0) |
| 2001–2003 | R. Charleroi S.C. | 67 | (0) |
| 2003–2004 | Flamengo | 0 | (0) |
| 2004–2005 | Hammarby IF | 7 | (1) |
| 2005–2006 | Fortaleza | 28 | (11) |
| 2006–2007 | FC Mashuk-KMV Pyatigorsk | 15 | (7) |
| 2007–2009 | Assyriska FF | 21 | (5) |
| 2008 | → Bodens BK (loan) | 17 | (0) |
| 2010 | Jiangsu Sainty | 9 | (2) |
| 2011 | Tianjin Songjiang | 12 | (0) |
| 2011 | Hà Nội | | |

International career
| 2001 | Sierra Leone | 3 | (0) |
- * Club domestic league appearances and goals

Aluspah Brewah (born August 24, 1983) is a retired Sierra Leonian international football player. He last played as a striker for Hanoi F.C. in the Vietnamese Super League and also played for the Sierra Leone national football team.

== Early career ==
At a young age of 14 years he was a member of the Sierra Leone Athletics team. He played with Ajax Academy in Ghana and Ashanti Gold SC West Africa before departing for Europe at the age of 17 years for Royal Antwerp FC of the Jupiler League.

== Professional play ==
After playing in the Jupiler League for almost three seasons, Brewah moved to Flamengo in Brazil's Campeonato Brasileiro League. He stayed there for just one season, moving next to Sweden with Hammarby IF Allsvenskan.

He next went back to Brazil's Campeonato Brasileiro League to play for Fortaleza EC where he sign for only one season. He was given the option to extend his term, but choose to go to the Russian Premier League with FC Mashuk-KMV Pyatigorsk for one season. Next he returned to Sweden to play for Assyriska FF.

Brewah joined Jiangsu Sainty on a free transfer in July 2010.

He made 3 appearances for the Sierra Leone national football team.
