= Tiago (footballer, born 1977) =

Brazilian footballer

Personal information
- Full name: Tiago Jorge Honório
- Date of birth: 4 December 1977 (age 48)
- Place of birth: Americana, Brazil
- Height: 1.92 m (6 ft 4 in)
- Position: Striker

Youth career
- 1996–1997: União Barbarense

Senior career*
Years	Team	Apps	(Gls)
1997–2000	União Barbarense		
2000–2003	Shenzhen Pingan	80	(44)
2004	Sanfrecce Hiroshima	10	(2)
2005	Atlético-PR		
2006	Shanghai United F.C.	21	(5)
2007	Beijing Guoan	14	(10)
2007	Goiás		
2008	→ Beijing Guoan (Loan)	26	(6)
2009	São Caetano		
2009	→ Suwon Bluewings (Loan)	14	(4)
2010	Shenzhen Ruby	14	(2)
2010	→ Chengdu Blades (Loan)	8	(6)
2011–2012	Fagiano Okayama	24	(8)
2013	Independente de Limeira		
- * Club domestic league appearances and goals as of 5 November 2010

Tiago Jorge Honório or simply Tiago (born 4 December 1977 in Americana), is a Brazilian former football striker, who last played for Independente de Limeira in Brazil.

== Honours ==
=== Club ===
Atlético-PR

- Paraná State League: 2005

Suwon Bluewings

- Korean FA Cup: 2009
