= Ninoslav Milenković =

Bosnian footballer (born 1977)

Personal information
- Date of birth: 31 December 1977 (age 48)
- Place of birth: Subotica, SFR Yugoslavia
- Height: 1.89 m (6 ft 2 in)
- Position: Centre-back

Team information
- Current team: Bosnia and Herzegovina (assistant)

Youth career
- Palić

Senior career*
Years	Team	Apps	(Gls)
1996–1998	Mladost Bački Jarak	26	(0)
1998–1999	B36 Tórshavn	28	(5)
1999–2001	Dynamo Dresden	25	(2)
2001–2002	SV Jügesheim	0	(0)
2001–2002	→ Hajduk Kula (loan)	2	(0)
2002–2004	Leotar	27	(3)
2004–2005	Lierse	39	(1)
2006–2007	Germinal Beerschot	28	(0)
2007	Sint-Truidense	10	(1)
2008	Sarajevo	13	(0)
2008–2009	Panserraikos	23	(1)
2009–2010	Enosis Neon Paralimni	21	(1)
2010	Qingdao Jonoon	12	(0)
2011	Istra 1961	8	(0)
2011–2012	Panserraikos	28	(0)
2012–2013	Doxa Drama	46	(0)
2014	Panserraikos		
Total		335	(14)

International career
1996	FR Yugoslavia U18	1	(0)
2004–2006	Bosnia and Herzegovina	15	(0)
- * Club domestic league appearances and goals

Ninoslav Milenković (Serbian Cyrillic: Нинослав Миленковић; born 31 December 1977) is a Bosnian former professional footballer who played as a centre-back. He is currently working as an assistant coach for the Bosnia and Herzegovina national team.

== Club career ==
Before coming to China, Milenković was active for Mladost Bački Jarak and Hajduk Kula in Serbia, B36 Tórshavn in the Faroe Islands, Sint-Truidense, Germinal Beerschot, Lierse in the Belgian First Division, Leotar and Sarajevo in the Bosnian Premier League, Dynamo Dresden in Germany, Panserraikos in Greece and Enosis Neon Paralimni in Cyprus.

Milenković transferred to Qingdao Jonoon in July 2010. He ended his career at Panserraikos in 2014.

== Managerial career ==
On 19 April 2024, Milenković was appointed as an assistant coach of the Bosnia and Herzegovina national team. He is also the main scout for the team along with Saša Papac.

== International career ==
Milenković made his debut for Bosnia and Herzegovina on 18 February 2004 friendly game away in Skoplje against Macedonia and has earned a total of 15 caps, scoring no goals. He played 7 games out of a possible 10 in the 2006 FIFA World Cup qualifiers. His final international was a September 2006 UEFA Euro qualifying match against Hungary.
