= Gilcimar (footballer, born 1981) =

Brazilian footballer

Personal information
- Full name: Gilcimar Chaves Caetano
- Date of birth: 19 March 1981 (age 45)
- Place of birth: Itaperuna, Brazil
- Height: 1.83 m (6 ft 0 in)
- Position: Forward

Senior career*
Years	Team	Apps	(Gls)
2005	Serrano		
2005	Zagłębie Lubin	1	(0)
2006	Madureira		
2006	Bangu		
2007–2008	Mesquita		
2008	Nova Iguaçu		
2008–2010	Tigres do Brasil		
2009	→ Duque de Caxias (loan)	12	(5)
2010	Ipatinga		
2010	Liaoning Whowin	15	(4)
2011–2012	Duque de Caxias		
2012–2014	Boavista		
2013	→ ABC (loan)	5	(2)
2014	America		
2015	Cabofriense		
2015	Artsul		
2016	Portuguesa da Ilha		
2017–2018	Audax Rio		
2018	→ Audax (loan)		
2018–2019	Macaé		
2019	Itaborai Profute		
2023	SE Paraty		
- * Club domestic league appearances and goals as of 19 March 2024

Gilcimar Chaves Caetano or simply Gilcimar (born 19 March 1981) is a Brazilian footballer who plays as a forward.

Gilcimar moved to China and signed a contract with Liaoning Whowin in July 2010. He made his Chinese Super League debut against Shenzhen Ruby on 28 July and scored his first goal for Liaoning in the 15th minute. He returned to Brazil and signed a contract with Duque de Caxias in 2011. In July 2012, he moved to Vila Nova on a free transfer.
