= Meng Wei =

Chinese politician and environmentalist

- 孟伟

President of the Chinese Research Academy of Environmental Sciences
- In office 2001–2016
- Preceded by: Chen Fu
- Succeeded by: Li Haisheng

Personal details
- Born: September 1956 (age 70) Qingdao, Shandong, China
- Party: Chinese Communist Party (1997–2018; expelled)
- Education: Ocean University of China

Meng Wei (simplified Chinese: 孟伟; traditional Chinese: 孟偉; pinyin: Mèng Wěi; born September 1956) is a former Chinese politician and environmentalist who served as president of the Chinese Research Academy of Environmental Sciences from 2001 to 2016. As of November 2017 he was under investigation by the Communist Party's anti-corruption agency. He was an academician of the Chinese Academy of Engineering. He was a deputy to the 11th and 12th National People's Congress. He was the first notable figure implicated in corruption following the 19th National Congress of the Chinese Communist Party on October 24, 2017. He is the third academician of the Chinese Academy of Engineering whose title has been revoked in the past two years, after Li Ning and Zhou Guotai. Meng Wei has been stripped of his post and party membership on April 4, 2018.

== Career ==
Meng Wei was born in Qingdao, Shandong in September 1956. He graduated from the Ocean University of China.

He entered the workforce in November 1976, and joined the Chinese Communist Party in July 1997.

After graduation, he was assigned to the Chinese Research Academy of Environmental Sciences, an academy affiliated to the Ministry of Environmental Protection of the People's Republic of China. He was appointed director of the Science and Technology Department of the Chinese Research Academy of Environmental Sciences, in July 1997, becoming vice-president in January 1999 and dean and president in December 2001.

In December 2009, he was elected a member of the Chinese Academy of Engineering.

In March 2013, he was elected deputy director of the Environmental and Resource Protection Committee of the National People's Congress.

== Downfall ==
On November 10, 2017, the Central Commission for Discipline Inspection announced that Meng had been placed under investigation for "serious legal violations". Four days later, the Chinese Academy of Engineering revoked Meng's membership.

On April 4, 2018, Meng Wei has been expelled from the Chinese Communist Party and removed from public office. The Central Commission for Discipline Inspection said in a statement that Meng violated the eight-point code on Party, went in and out of private clubs in violation of regulations, sought benefits for others in terms of job promotions, and illegally transferred shares and resulted huge losses of state-owned assets.

== Works ==
=== Papers ===
- Modern Sedimentation Rates in the Intertidal Zone on the West Coast of the Bohai Gulf, Meng Wei, Lei Kun, Acta Oceanologica Sinica, 2005, vol.24. No.3
- Preliminary Study on the Dissolved Oxygen Distributions and Influential Factors in the Daliao River Estuary and Its Adjacent Areas, Lei Kun, Meng Wei, Acta Oceanologica Sinica, 2004, Vol.23, No.1.
- Anpassung Des Umweltmanagement An Die Aktuelle Situation in China, Meng Wei, Luty Krapp, Mull and Abfall, 2002, Vol.34, No.3.

=== Books ===
- Meng Wei (2004). 《海岸带污水排放工程环境设计导则》 (in Chinese). The Ocean Press. ISBN 9787502760847.
- Meng Wei (2015). 《流域水质目标管理理论与方法学导论》 (in Chinese). The Science Press. ISBN 9787030442987.
- Meng Wei; Shu Jianmin; Yang Rongjin (2015). 《突发环境事件污染损害评估：11.21空难与南海湿地》 (in Chinese). China Environment Press. ISBN 9787511122230.
- Meng Wei; Shu Jianmin; Zhang Lingbo (2017). 《生态文明建设的总体战略与十三五重点任务研究》 (in Chinese). The Science Press. ISBN 9787030527493.
- Meng Wei; Liu Zhengtao; Yan Zhenguang; Zheng Xin; Zhang Yauhi (2014). 《水生生物水质基准理论与应用》 (in Chinese). Chemical Industry Press. ISBN 9787122199270.
- Meng Wei; He Yingchen (2005). 《废物资源化与安全处置技术概论》 (in Chinese). China Environment Press. ISBN 9787802091924.
- Meng Wei; He Yingchen; Fan Junjun (2005). 《固体废物环境管理技术应用与实践》 (in Chinese). China Environment Press. ISBN 9787802091276.
- Meng Wei; Wu Fengchang (2014). 《中国环境基准体系中长期路线图》 (in Chinese). The Science Press. ISBN 9787030400734.

Government offices
Preceded by Chen Fu (陈复)	President of the Chinese Research Academy of Environmental Sciences; 2001–2016	Succeeded by Li Haisheng (李海生)
