= Márcio Senna =

Brazilian footballer

Personal information
- Full name: Márcio Senna da Silva
- Date of birth: 21 May 1981 (age 45)
- Place of birth: São Paulo, Brazil
- Height: 1.82 m (6 ft 0 in)
- Position: Midfielder

Senior career*
Years	Team	Apps	(Gls)
2003	Juventude		
2007–2008	Juventus (SP)	3	(0)
2008	Grêmio Barueri	3	(0)
2008–2009	Vaduz	7	(0)
2010	Red Bull Brasil		
2010	Dalian Shide	10	(0)
2011–2013	Rio Verde	5	(0)
2013	Monte Azul	0	(0)
- * Club domestic league appearances and goals

Márcio Senna da Silva (born 21 May 1981) is a Brazilian former professional footballer who played as a midfielder.

== Career ==
Senna was born in São Paulo. He moved to Grêmio Barueri of the Brazilian Série B on 16 May 2008, signing with the club on a one-year deal. On 23 July, he moved to Vaduz, signing a two-year deal, but left the club on 19 June 2009.

Senna joined Chinese Super League side Dalian Shide in July 2010.

== Personal life ==
Márcio is the brother of Spanish former international footballer Marcos Senna and the cousin of Brazilian former midfielder Marcos Assunção.
