= Wang Jie (footballer, born 1982) =

Chinese association football player

Personal information
- Date of birth: 4 April 1982 (age 44)
- Height: 1.78 m (5 ft 10 in)
- Position: Defender

Team information
- Current team: Nanjing City
- Number: 39

Senior career*
Years	Team	Apps	(Gls)
2004–2010	Jiangsu Sainty	51	(0)
2010	→ Beijing BIT (loan)	9	(0)
2021–	Nanjing City	0	(0)
- * Club domestic league appearances and goals

Wang Jie (simplified Chinese: 王杰; traditional Chinese: 王傑; pinyin: Wáng Jié; born 4 April 1982) was a Chinese footballer who played for China League One side Nanjing City.

== Career statistics ==
=== Club ===
Club	Season	League			Cup		Continental		Other		Total	
Club	Season	Division	Apps	Goals	Apps	Goals	Apps	Goals	Apps	Goals	Apps	Goals
Jiangsu Sainty	2009	Chinese Super League	2	0	0	0	–		0	0	2	0
Jiangsu Sainty	2010	Chinese Super League	0	0	0	0	–		0	0	0	0
Career total			2	0	0	0	0	0	0	0	2	0
