= 2012 Tianjin Teda F.C. season =

Tianjin Teda
2012 season
- Chairman: Li Guangyi
- Manager: Josip Kuže (till 27 May 2012); Alexandre Guimarães (from 1 June 2012)
- Stadium: Tianjin Olympic Center Stadium
- Super League: 8th
- FA Cup: Fourth round vs Shandong Luneng Taishan
- Super Cup: Runners-up
- AFC Champions League: Group stage
- Top goalscorer: League: Sjoerd Ars (13); All: Sjoerd Ars (13)
Home colours	Away colours

The 2012 Tianjin Teda F.C. season was the club's 9th season in the Chinese Super League, and 44th season in China's top flight. They started the season with Josip Kuže as manager, before replacing him with Alexandre Guimarães halfway through the season. Domestically they finished the season in 8th place, reached the Fourth Round of the FA Cup and were runners-up in the Super Cup. Tianjin Teda also participated in the AFC Champions League, where they were placed in a group with Seongnam, Nagoya Grampus and Central Coast Mariners, they finished bottom of the group with 3 points.

== Squad ==
As of 13 July 2012

Note: Flags indicate national team as defined under FIFA eligibility rules; some limited exceptions apply. Players may hold more than one non-FIFA nationality.

No.	Pos.	Nation	Player
1	GK	CHN	Song Zhenyu
2	DF	CHN	He Yang
3	DF	CHN	Li Hongyang
4	DF	AUS	Milan Susak
5	DF	CHN	Li Weifeng
6	DF	ROU	Lucian Goian
7	MF	CHN	Li Benjian
8	MF	CHN	Hu Rentian
9	FW	CHN	Zhou Liao
10	MF	CHN	Wang Xinxin (captain)
11	FW	CHN	Jiang Chen
12	GK	CHN	Tian Xu
14	FW	CHN	Fan Zhiqiang
15	DF	CHN	Liao Bochao
17	FW	CHN	Hui Jiakang
18	MF	CHN	Zheng Jin

No.	Pos.	Nation	Player
19	DF	CHN	Nie Tao
20	FW	CHN	Mao Biao
21	MF	CHN	Chen Tao
23	GK	CHN	Lu Zheyu
24	DF	CHN	Bai Yuefeng
25	GK	CHN	Yang Qipeng
26	DF	CHN	Cao Yang (vice captain)
27	MF	CHN	Ma Leilei
28	FW	NED	Sjoerd Ars (on loan from Levski Sofia)
29	MF	MKD	Veliče Šumulikoski
30	GK	CHN	Zhao Yanming
31	FW	SRB	Vladimir Jovančić (on loan from Seongnam)
35	MF	CHN	Du Zhenyu
40	FW	CHN	Du Junpeng
41	MF	CHN	Zhao Yingjie

=== Reserve squad ===
Note: Flags indicate national team as defined under FIFA eligibility rules; some limited exceptions apply. Players may hold more than one non-FIFA nationality.

No.	Pos.	Nation	Player
42	DF	CHN	Li Lei
43	DF	CHN	Lin Chen
44	DF	CHN	Liu Menglin
45	DF	CHN	Wang Junnian
46	MF	CHN	Zhang Chunxuan
47	MF	CHN	Chen Xi
48	FW	CHN	Xiang Xin
49	FW	CHN	Yang Xiaole
50	DF	CHN	Fan Yifu

No.	Pos.	Nation	Player
51	MF	CHN	Wang Chao
52	FW	CHN	Gu Yufei
53	MF	CHN	Zhang Jin
54	FW	CHN	Wang Baoda
55	DF	CHN	Zhang Xuepeng
56	DF	CHN	Xie Hongyan
57	FW	CHN	Li Guoliang
58	MF	CHN	Liu Song

=== On loan ===
Note: Flags indicate national team as defined under FIFA eligibility rules; some limited exceptions apply. Players may hold more than one non-FIFA nationality.

No.	Pos.	Nation	Player
-	DF	CHN	Jia Yudong (at Hebei Zhongji until 31 December 2012)
-	MF	CHN	Bai Yuexuan (at Hunan Billows until 31 December 2012)

No.	Pos.	Nation	Player
-	MF	CHN	Fan Baiqun (at Shenyang Shenbei until 31 December 2012)
-	FW	CHN	Li Yaoyue (at Tianjin Songjiang until 31 December 2012)

== Transfers ==
=== Winter ===
In Note: Flags indicate national team as defined under FIFA eligibility rules; some limited exceptions apply. Players may hold more than one non-FIFA nationality.

No.	Pos.	Nation	Player
3	DF	CHN	Li Hongyang (from Chengdu Blades)
4	DF	AUS	Milan Susak (from (Australia) Adelaide United)
6	DF	ROU	Lucian Goian (from (Romania) Astra Ploieşti)
9	MF	CHN	Zhou Liao (from Hubei Wuhan Zhongbo)
16	FW	ENG	Akpo Sodje (from (Scotland) Hibernian)
17	MF	CHN	Hui Jiakang (from Chengdu Blades)
23	GK	CHN	Lu Zheyu (loan return from Jiangsu Sainty)
28	FW	NED	Sjoerd Ars (loan from (Bulgaria) PFC Levski Sofia)
29	MF	MKD	Veliče Šumulikoski (from (Russia) Sibir Novosibirsk)
-	DF	CHN	Mao Kaiyu (loan return from Shenyang Dongjin)
-	MF	CHN	Lü Wei (loan return from Shenyang Dongjin)
-	MF	CHN	Li Xingcan (loan return from Shenyang Shenbei)
-	DF	CHN	Cui Zhongkai (loan return from Shenyang Shenbei)

Out: Note: Flags indicate national team as defined under FIFA eligibility rules; some limited exceptions apply. Players may hold more than one non-FIFA nationality.

No.	Pos.	Nation	Player
4	DF	CHN	Wu Ze (Retired)
6	DF	SRB	Marko Zorić (to (Serbia) Banat Zrenjanin)
13	MF	CHN	Bai Yuexuan (loan to Hunan Billows)
16	MF	CHN	Zhang Xiaobin (to Beijing Guoan)
21	MF	CHN	Han Yanming (to Fujian Smart Hero)
22	FW	CHN	Yu Dabao (to Dalian Aerbin)
23	MF	CHN	Wu Wei'an (to Guangzhou R&F)
28	FW	CHN	Lu Yang (to Hebei Zhongji)
29	FW	CHN	Fan Baiqun (loan to Shenyang Shenbei)
31	MF	CHN	Han Cai (to Hebei Zhongji)
32	DF	CHN	Jia Yudong (loan to Hebei Zhongji)
35	FW	ARG	Luciano Olguín (to Hohhot Dongjin)
37	FW	CHN	Mu Yutan (Released)
38	MF	CHN	Xu Xiaolong (to Hebei Zhongji)
40	MF	CHN	Li Yaoyue (loan to Tianjin Songjiang)
42	FW	ROU	Marius Bilaşco (to (Germany) Energie Cottbus)
44	MF	KOR	Song Chong-Gug (Retired)
-	MF	CHN	Li Xingcan (to Shenyang Shenbei)
-	DF	CHN	Cui Zhongkai (to Beijing Baxy)
-	MF	CHN	Pang Lei (to Hebei Zhongji)
-	FW	CHN	Gao Yunfei (to Hebei Zhongji)
-	DF	CHN	Mao Kaiyu (to Hohhot Dongjin)
-	MF	CHN	Lü Wei (to Hohhot Dongjin)
-	DF	CHN	Li Xiang (to Hohhot Dongjin)

=== Summer ===
In Note: Flags indicate national team as defined under FIFA eligibility rules; some limited exceptions apply. Players may hold more than one non-FIFA nationality.

No.	Pos.	Nation	Player
31	FW	SRB	Vladimir Jovančić (loan from (South Korea) Seongnam Ilhwa Chunma)
35	MF	CHN	Du Zhenyu (loan from Changchun Yatai)

Out: Note: Flags indicate national team as defined under FIFA eligibility rules; some limited exceptions apply. Players may hold more than one non-FIFA nationality.

No.	Pos.	Nation	Player
16	FW	ENG	Akpo Sodje (to (England) Preston North End)

== Competitions ==
=== Chinese FA Super Cup ===
25 February 2012	Guangzhou Evergrande	2–1	Tianjin Teda
14:00 UTC+08:00	Cléo 2', 48'; Zhao Xuri (yellow card) 42'; Qin Sheng (yellow card) 79'; Xiaoting (yellow card) 87'	Report	Šumulikoski (yellow card) 31'; Wang Xinxin 83'	Attendance: 11,123; Referee: Tan Hai

=== Chinese Super League ===
==== Results ====
11 March 2012 1	Tianjin Teda	1–0	Dalian Aerbin	Tianjin
19:30 UTC+8	Li Weifeng (yellow card) 23'; Nie Tao (yellow card) 45'; Ars 82'; Sodje (yellow card) 88'	Report	Zhao Hejing (yellow card) 11'; Canales (yellow card) 12'; Chen Lei (red card) 68'	Stadium: TEDA Football Stadium; Attendance: 7,979; Referee: Ma Ning

16 March 2012 2	Qingdao Jonoon	2–1	Tianjin Teda	Qingdao
19:35 UTC+8	Zhu Jianrong 4' Guo Liang (yellow card) 36'; Li Peng (yellow card) 45'; Li Zhuangfei (yellow card) 64'; Liu Jian 85'; Sodje 81'	Report		Stadium: Qingdao Tiantai Stadium; Attendance: 8,225; Referee: Fan Qi

25 March 2012 3	Tianjin Teda	0–0	Jiangsu Sainty	Tianjin
20:30 UTC+8	Wang Xinxin (yellow card) 44'; Hui Jiakang (yellow card) 69'	Report	Jevtić (yellow card) 43'	Stadium: TEDA Football Stadium; Attendance: 9,823; Referee: Ma Li

30 March 2012 4	Beijing Guoan	3–1	Tianjin Teda	Beijing
20:30 UTC+8	Reinaldo 51'; Xu Liang 55'; Zhang Xizhe 74'	Report	Šumulikoski (yellow card) 52'; Wang Xinxin 67'; He Yang (yellow card) 80'	Stadium: Workers Stadium; Attendance: 38,508; Referee: Kyung-Ho Joo

8 April 2012 5	Tianjin Teda	1–2	Guangzhou R&F	Tianjin
16:30 UTC+8	Ars 76'; Chen Tao (yellow card) 80'; Mao Biao (yellow card) 90'	Report	Xu Bo (yellow card) 15'; Gao Zengxiang (yellow card) 46'; Davi 49'; Rafael Coelho 51'; Lu Lin (yellow card) 70'	Stadium: TEDA Football Stadium; Attendance: 11,469; Referee: Huang Yejun

13 April 2012 6	Shanghai Shenhua	0–1	Tianjin Teda	Shanghai
19:45 UTC+8	Yu Tao (yellow card) 66'; Anelka (yellow card) 77'	Report	Ars 39' (yellow card) 39'; Song Zhenyu (yellow card) 82'	Stadium: Hongkou Football Stadium; Attendance: 11,215; Referee: Hai Tan

22 April 2012 7	Tianjin Teda	2–0	Hangzhou Greentown	Tianjin
19:30 UTC+8	Goian (yellow card) 23'; Wang Xinxin 28'; Susak (yellow card) 65'; Ars 69'	Report	Du Wei (yellow card) 54'; Mazola (yellow card) 61'	Stadium: TEDA Football Stadium; Attendance: 11,966; Referee: Wang Zhe

27 April 2012 8	Tianjin Teda	0–1	Guangzhou Evergrande	Tianjin
19:30 CST	Goian (yellow card) 33'; Mao Biao (yellow card) 82'	Report	Feng Junyan (yellow card) 47'; Sun Xiang (yellow card) 62'; Muriqui 85'	Stadium: TEDA Football Stadium; Attendance: 18,589; Referee: Ai Kun

6 May 2012 9	Dalian Shide	4–1	Tianjin Teda	Dalian
15:30 UTC+8	Chamanga 9', 28', 87'; Kamburov 31'; Honglüe (yellow card) 44'	Report	Li Weifeng (yellow card) 12'; Šumulikoski (yellow card) 77'; Goian (yellow card) 81'; Ars 86'; Li Benjian (yellow card) 90+9'	Stadium: Jinzhou Stadium; Attendance: 6,158; Referee: Yao Qing

11 May 2012 10	Tianjin Teda	2–0	Shandong Luneng Taishan	Tianjin
19:30 UTC+8	Li Weifeng (yellow card) 39'; Ars 67'; Susak 70'; Zheng Zheng (yellow card) 41'	Report		Stadium: TEDA Football Stadium; Attendance: 11,688; Referee: Wang Zhe

20 May 2012 11	Liaoning Whowin	2–1	Tianjin Teda	Shenyang
15:30 UTC+8	Trifunović (yellow card) 29' (goal) 47'; Grozdanoski (yellow card) 52'; Zhao Junzhe 90+6' (pen.)	Report	Goian (yellow card) 52'; Sodje (yellow card) 62'; Ars 82' (pen.); Bai Yuefeng (yellow card) 90+3'	Stadium: Tiexi New District Sports Center; Attendance: 18,675; Referee: Li Haihe

25 May 2012 12	Tianjin Teda	0–0	Shanghai Shenxin	Tianjin
19:30 UTC+8	Liao Bochao (yellow card) 17'; Susak (yellow card) 34'; Cao Yang (yellow card) 39'	Report	Xu Wen (yellow card) 39'; Zou Zhongting (yellow card) 85'	Stadium: TEDA Football Stadium; Attendance: 7,686; Referee: Li Jun

16 June 2012 13	Henan Jianye	0–2	Tianjin Teda	Henan
19:30 UTC+8		Report	Ars 27'; He Yang (yellow card) 29'; Wang Xinxin 57'	Stadium: Zhengzhou Hanghai Stadium; Attendance: 17,473; Referee: Yao Qing

23 June 2012 14	Tianjin Teda	1–2	Guizhou Renhe	Tianjin
19:30 UTC+8	Bai Yuefeng (yellow card) 15'; Ars 23' (pen.)	Report	Yu Hai 52'; Zhang Chenglin 75'	Stadium: TEDA Football Stadium; Attendance: 13,602; Referee: Zhang Zhengping

1 July 2012 15	Changchun Yatai	1–1	Tianjin Teda	Changchun
19:35 UTC+8	Cao Tianbao 47'	Report	Li Weifeng (yellow card) 21'; Goian 58'	Stadium: Development Area Stadium; Attendance: 11,231; Referee: Tao Rancheng

7 July 2012 16	Dalian Aerbin	1–1	Tianjin Teda	Dalian
19:00 UTC+8	Utaka 36'; Zhao Hejing (yellow card) 63'	Report	Mao Biao 21' (yellow card) 45'; Bai Yuefeng (yellow card) 26'; Goian (yellow card) 53'; Ars (yellow card) 79'; Liao Bochao (yellow card) 89'	Stadium: Jinzhou Stadium; Attendance: 15,761; Referee: Tao Rancheng

14 July 2012 17	Tianjin Teda	0–0	Qingdao Jonoon	Tianjin
19:30 UTC+8	He Yang (yellow card) 72'	Report	Guo Liang (yellow card) 58'; Mou Pengfei (yellow card) 82'	Stadium: TEDA Football Stadium; Attendance: 17,368; Referee: Xu Fuxin

22 July 2012 18	Jiangsu Sainty	3–2	Tianjin Teda	Nanjing
19:40 UTC+8	Jevtić 10'; Ji Xiang 23'; Dănălache 42'; Jiang Jiajun (yellow card) 81'	Report	Susak (yellow card) 8'; Lu Bofei 21' (o.g.); Jovančić 26'; Šumulikoski (yellow card) 34'	Stadium: Nanjing Olympic Sports Center; Attendance: 28,546; Referee: Zhang Zhengping

28 July 2012 19	Tianjin Teda	2–1	Beijing Guoan	Tianjin
19:30 UTC+8	Mao Biao (yellow card) 34'; Ars 52'; Du Zhenyu (yellow card) 69' (goal) 79'; Nie Tao (yellow card) 72'; Li Weifeng (yellow card) 90+5'	Report	Kanouté 78'; Xu Yunlong (yellow card) 81'	Stadium: TEDA Football Stadium; Attendance: 35,868; Referee: Hiroyoshi Takayama (Japan)

5 August 2012 20	Guangzhou R&F	1–2	Tianjin Teda	Guangzhou
20:00 UTC+8	Yakubu 22'; Davi (yellow card) 83'	Report	Cao Yang 34'; Du Zhenyu (yellow card) 39'; Ars 42'; Nie Tao (yellow card) 65'; Šumulikoski (yellow card) 70'	Stadium: Yuexiushan Stadium; Attendance: 5,601; Referee: Xu Fuxin

11 August 2012 21	Tianjin Teda	0–0	Shanghai Shenhua	Tianjin
19:30 UTC+8	Ars (yellow card) 27'; Goian (yellow card) 77'	Report		Stadium: TEDA Football Stadium; Attendance: 30,248; Referee: Yao Qing

18 August 2012 22	Hangzhou Greentown	1–2	Tianjin Teda	Hangzhou
19:35 UTC+8	Kim Dong-Jin 64'	Report	Ars 5' (yellow card) 75'; Goian (yellow card) 51'; Hui Jiakang (yellow card) 62'; Mao Biao 85'	Stadium: Yellow Dragon Stadium; Attendance: 4,396; Referee: Fan Qi

25 August 2012 23	Guangzhou Evergrande	0–0	Tianjin Teda	Guangzhou
20:35 UTC+8	Zheng Zhi (yellow card) 6'	Summary	Mao Biao (yellow card) 21'; He Yang (yellow card) 52'; Chen Tao (yellow card) 59'; Li Weifeng (yellow card) 67'	Stadium: Tianhe Stadium; Attendance: 38,700; Referee: Fan Qi

31 August 2012 24	Tianjin Teda	1–1	Dalian Shide	Tianjin
20:30 UTC+8	Goian (yellow card) 30'; Ars 45+2'; Li Weifeng (yellow card) 62'	Summary	Kamburov 35' (yellow card) 51'; Lü Peng (yellow card) 77'	Stadium: TEDA Football Stadium; Attendance: 13,337; Referee: Hai Tan

23 September 2012 25	Shandong Luneng Taishan	2–0	Tianjin Teda	Jinan
20:30 UTC+8	Wang Qiang (yellow card) 50' (goal) 69'; Hao Junmin 52'; Yuan Weiwei (yellow card) 60'; Yang Cheng (yellow card) 71'; Cui Peng (yellow card) 87'	Summary	Du Zhenyu (yellow card) 13'; Li Weifeng (yellow card) 45'; Susak (yellow card) 55'	Stadium: Shandong Provincial Stadium; Attendance: 10,783; Referee: Choi Dae-Woo (South Korea)

28 September 2012 26	Tianjin Teda	1–0	Liaoning Whowin	Tianjin
20:30 UTC+8	Šumulikoski (yellow card) 32'; Jovančić 79' (pen.); Li Benjian (yellow card) 90'	Summary	Zhang Jingyang (yellow card) 33'; Han Xuegeng (yellow card) 39'; Zhao Hongxu (yellow card) 70'; Kim Yoo-Jin (red card) 78'	Stadium: TEDA Football Stadium; Attendance: 7,672; Referee: Zhong Jun

6 October 2012 27	Shanghai Shenxin	0–1	Tianjin Teda	Shanghai
20:45 UTC+8	Xu Wen (yellow card) 40' (yellow-red card) 44'; Salley (yellow card) 52'	Summary	Zhou Liao (yellow card) 29'; Goian (yellow card) 54'; Jovančić 63'	Stadium: Jinshan Sports Centre; Attendance: 12,917; Referee: Matthew Gillett (Australia)

20 October 2012 28	Tianjin Teda	1–1	Henan Jianye	Tianjin
20:30 UTC+8	Goian 28'; Li Weifeng (yellow card) 41'	Summary	Huang Xiyang (yellow card) 40'; Xiao Zhi 90'	Stadium: TEDA Football Stadium; Attendance: 8,842; Referee: Kris Griffiths-Jones (Australia)

27 October 2012 29	Guizhou Renhe	1–1	Tianjin Teda	Guiyang
15:30 UTC+8	Djulbic 24'; Liu Qing (yellow card) 48'; Liu Tianqi (yellow card) 78'	Summary	Bai Yuefeng (yellow card) 26'; Liao Bochao (yellow card) 32'; Du Zhenyu 38' (yellow card) 61' (yellow-red card) 90'	Stadium: Guiyang Olympic Sports Center; Attendance: 22,688; Referee: Ma Ning

3 November 2012 30	Tianjin Teda	0–1	Changchun Yatai	Tianjin
15:30 UTC+8	Li Weifeng (yellow card) 75'	Summary	Marquinhos 7' (yellow card) 82'	Stadium: TEDA Football Stadium; Attendance: 6,485; Referee: Hai Tan

==== League table ====
Pos	Team	Pld	W	D	L	GF	GA	GD	Pts
6	Changchun Yatai	30	12	8	10	37	40	−3	44 (Note: Dalian 1–2 Changchun; Changchun 1–2 Dalian)
7	Guangzhou R&F	30	13	3	14	47	49	−2	42
8	Tianjin TEDA	30	10	10	10	29	30	−1	40
9	Shanghai Shenhua	30	8	14	8	39	34	+5	38
10	Liaoning Whowin	30	8	12	10	40	41	−1	36 (Note: Liaoning, 10pts; Hangzhou, 9pts; Shandong, 6pts, GF=4, GA=5; Qingdao, 6pts, GF=4, GA=5)

Source: Chinese Super League (in Chinese)
Rules for classification: 1) points; 2) goal difference; 3) number of goals scored; 4) head-to-head goals scored; 5) goal difference; 6) goals scored; 7) disciplinary points (1 point for each yellow card, 3 points for each red card). Head-to-Head: Only used at the end of the season when two or more teams need the head-to-head rules to break a tie.

=== Chinese FA Cup ===
18 July 2012 Fourth Round	Tianjin Teda	1–1 (2–4 p)	Shandong Luneng	Tianjin
20:30	Mao Biao 58'		Ortigoza 70'	Stadium: TEDA Football Stadium

=== AFC Champions League ===
Pos	Team	Pld	W	D	L	GF	GA	GD	Pts	Qualification	SIC	NGY	CCM	TTD
1	(South Korea) Seongnam Ilhwa Chunma	6	2	4	0	13	5	+8	10 (Note: Seongnam Ilhwa Chunma and Nagoya Grampus are tied on their head-to-head record (2 pts, 0 GD, 3 GF), and so are ranked by their overall goal difference.)	Advance to knockout stage	—	1–1	5–0	1–1
2	(Japan) Nagoya Grampus	6	2	4	0	10	4	+6	10	Advance to knockout stage	2–2	—	3–0	0–0
3	(Australia) Central Coast Mariners	6	1	3	2	7	11	−4	6		1–1	1–1	—	5–1
4	(China) Tianjin Teda	6	0	3	3	2	12	−10	3		0–3	0–3	0–0	—

Source: WorldFootball.net
Notes:

7 March 2012 1	Tianjin Teda (China)	0–0	(Australia) Central Coast Mariners	Tianjin, China
20:00 UTC+08:00		Report	Bojić (yellow card) 55'; Kwasnik (yellow card) 64'	Stadium: TEDA Football Stadium; Attendance: 19,800; Referee: Abdullah Al Hilali (Oman)

21 March 2012 2	Seongnam Ilhwa Chunma (South Korea)	1–1	(China) Tianjin Teda	Seongnam, South Korea
18:00 UTC+08:00	Han Sang-Woon 14'	Report	He Yang (yellow card) 10'; Bai Yuefeng (yellow card) 37'; Li Weifeng (yellow card) 57'; Goian 68'; Cao Yang (yellow card) 71'	Stadium: Tancheon Sports Complex; Attendance: 2,553; Referee: Abdullah Balideh (Qatar)

3 April 2012 3	Tianjin Teda (China)	0–3	(Japan) Nagoya Grampus	Tianjin, China
19:30 UTC+08:00	Zhou Liao (yellow card) 9'; Goian (yellow card) 12'; Li Weifeng (yellow card) 16'; Susak (yellow card) 21'; Chen Tao (yellow card) 53'	Report	Fujimoto (yellow card) 16' (goal) 24'; Tamada 49'; Nagai 73'	Stadium: TEDA Football Stadium; Attendance: 12,249; Referee: Ravshan Irmatov (Uzbekistan)

18 April 2012 4	Nagoya Grampus (Japan)	0–0	(China) Tianjin Teda	Nagoya, Japan
18:00 UTC+08:00	Ogawa (yellow card) 20'	Report	Cao Yang (yellow card) 36'; He Yang (yellow card) 58'; Zhou Liao (yellow card) 90+3'	Stadium: Mizuho Athletic Stadium; Attendance: 6,006; Referee: Kwok Man Liu (Hong Kong)

1 May 2012 5	Central Coast Mariners (Australia)	5–1	(China) Tianjin Teda	Gosford, Australia
17:30 UTC+08:00	McBreen 9', 20'; Rose 49'; McGlinchey 72'; Bojić (yellow card) 76'; Amini 86'	Report	Li Hongyang (yellow card) 28'; Susak (yellow card) 43'; Liao Bochao 73'	Stadium: Central Coast Stadium; Attendance: 4,155; Referee: Mohamed Abdelkarim Mohamed Ismail Al Zarouni (UAE)

15 May 2012 6	Tianjin Teda (China)	0–3	(South Korea) Seongnam Ilhwa Chunma	Tianjin, China
19:30 UTC+08:00	Zhou Liao (yellow card) 39'; Ars (yellow card) 47'; Li Hongyang (yellow card) 60'; Zheng Jin (yellow card) 63'; Šumulikoski (yellow card) 79'	Report	Yoon Bit-Garam 33'; Jovančić 49' 68' (pen.) (yellow card) 68'	Referee: Alireza Faghani (Iran)

== Squad statistics ==
=== Appearances and goals ===
No.	Pos	Nat	Player	Total		Super League		FA Cup		Super Cup		Champions League	
No.	Pos	Nat	Player	Apps	Goals	Apps	Goals	Apps	Goals	Apps	Goals	Apps	Goals
1	GK	(China) CHN	Song Zhenyu	6	0	0	0	1	0	1	0	4	0
2	DF	(China) CHN	He Yang	4	0	0	0	0	0	1	0	3	0
3	DF	(China) CHN	Li Hongyang	2	0	0	0	0	0	0	0	2	0
4	DF	(Australia) AUS	Milan Susak	7	0	0	0	1	0	1	0	5	0
5	DF	(China) CHN	Li Weifeng	6	0	0	0	1	0	1	0	4	0
6	DF	(Romania) ROU	Lucian Goian	7	1	0	0	1	0	1	0	5	1
7	MF	(China) CHN	Li Benjian	4	0	0	0	0	0	1	0	2+1	0
8	MF	(China) CHN	Hu Rentian	3	0	0	0	0+1	0	0+1	0	0+1	0
9	FW	(China) CHN	Zhou Liao	4	0	0	0	0	0	0	0	2+2	0
10	MF	(China) CHN	Wang Xinxin	7	1	0	0	1	0	1	1	4+1	0
15	DF	(China) CHN	Liao Bochao	5	1	0	0	0+1	0	0	0	3+1	1
17	FW	(China) CHN	Hui Jiakang	5	0	0	0	0	0	0	0	3+2	0
18	MF	(China) CHN	Zheng Jin	2	0	0	0	0	0	0	0	1+1	0
19	DF	(China) CHN	Nie Tao	5	0	0	0	0	0	0+1	0	3+1	0
20	FW	(China) CHN	Mao Biao	6	1	0	0	1	1	0+1	0	2+2	0
21	MF	(China) CHN	Chen Tao	3	0	0	0	0	0	0	0	3	0
23	GK	(China) CHN	Lu Zheyu	1	0	0	0	0	0	0	0	0+1	0
24	DF	(China) CHN	Bai Yuefeng	8	0	0	0	1	0	1	0	4+2	0
25	GK	(China) CHN	Yang Qipeng	1	0	0	0	0	0	0	0	1	0
26	MF	(China) CHN	Cao Yang	7	0	0	0	1	0	1	0	5	0
28	FW	(Netherlands) NED	Sjoerd Ars	8	0	0	0	0+1	0	1	0	4+2	0
29	MF	(North Macedonia) MKD	Veliče Šumulikoski	8	0	0	0	1	0	1	0	5+1	0
31	FW	(Serbia) SRB	Vladimir Jovančić	1	0	0	0	1	0	0	0	0	0
35	MF	(China) CHN	Du Zhenyu	1	0	0	0	1	0	0	0	0	0
Players who left Tianjin Teda during the season:

=== Goal scorers ===
Place	Position	Nation	Number	Name	Super League	FA Cup	SuperCup	Champions League	Total
1	FW	(Netherlands)	28	Sjoerd Ars	13	0	0	0	13
2	MF	(China)	10	Wang Xinxin	3	0	1	0	4
3	FW	(Serbia)	31	Vladimir Jovančić	3	0	0	0	3
3	DF	(Romania)	6	Lucian Goian	2	0	0	1	3
5	FW	(China)	20	Mao Biao	2	0	0	0	2
5	MF	(China)	35	Du Zhenyu	2	0	0	0	2
7	FW	(England)	16	Akpo Sodje	1	0	0	0	1
7	DF	(Australia)	4	Milan Susak	1	0	0	0	1
7	DF	(China)	26	Cao Yang	1	0	0	0	1
7				Own goal	1	0	0	0	1
7	FW	(China)	20	Mao Biao	0	1	0	0	1
7	DF	(China)	15	Liao Bochao	0	0	0	1	1
				TOTALS	29	1	1	2	33

=== Disciplinary record ===
Number	Nation	Position	Name	Super League		FA Cup		Super Cup		Champions League		Total	
Number	Nation	Position	Name	Yellow card	Red card	Yellow card	Red card	Yellow card	Red card	Yellow card	Red card	Yellow card	Red card
2	(China)	DF	He Yang	0	0	0	0	0	0	3	0	3	0
3	(China)	DF	Li Hongyang	0	0	0	0	0	0	2	0	2	0
4	(Australia)	DF	Milan Susak	0	0	0	0	0	0	2	0	2	0
5	(China)	DF	Li Weifeng	0	0	0	0	0	0	2	0	2	0
6	(Romania)	DF	Lucian Goian	0	0	0	0	0	0	1	0	1	0
9	(China)	FW	Zhou Liao	0	0	0	0	0	0	3	0	3	0
18	(China)	MF	Zheng Jin	0	0	0	0	0	0	1	0	1	0
21	(China)	MF	Chen Tao	0	0	0	0	0	0	1	0	1	0
24	(China)	DF	Bai Yuefeng	0	0	0	0	0	0	1	0	1	0
26	(China)	DF	Cao Yang	0	0	0	0	0	0	3	0	3	0
28	(Netherlands)	FW	Sjoerd Ars	0	0	0	0	0	0	1	0	1	0
29	(North Macedonia)	MF	Veliče Šumulikoski	0	0	0	0	1	0	1	0	2	0
			TOTALS	0	0	0	0	1	0	21	0	22	0
