= 2012 Chinese FA Super Cup =

Guangzhou Evergrande	Tianjin Teda
2	1
- Date: 25 February 2012
- Venue: Guangzhou Higher Education Mega Center Central Stadium, Guangzhou
- Man of the Match: (Brazil) Cléo
- Referee: Tan Hai
- Attendance: 11,123
- Weather: Light Rain

The 2012 Chinese FA Super Cup (Chinese: 2012中国足球协会超级杯) was the 10th Chinese Football Super Cup, an annual football match contested by the winners of the previous season's Super League and FA Cup competitions. The match was played at the Guangzhou University City Stadium on 25 February 2012, and contested by league winner Guangzhou Evergrande and cup winner Tianjin Teda. Guangzhou Evergrande won the title 2–1.

== Match details ==
25 February 2012
14:00 UTC+8

Guangzhou Evergrande	2–1	Tianjin Teda
Cléo 2', 48'	Report	Wang Xinxin 83'

Guangzhou University City Stadium, Guangzhou
Attendance: 11,123
Referee: Tan Hai (Beijing)

Guangzhou Evergrande	Tianjin Teda

GK	1	(China) Yang Jun
RB	14	(China) Li Jianhua (c)
CB	5	(China) Zhang Linpeng
CB	6	(China) Feng Xiaoting	(yellow card) 87'
LB	32	(China) Sun Xiang
DM	16	(South Korea) Cho Won-Hee
DM	37	(China) Zhao Xuri	(yellow card) 42'	(substituted off) 59'
AM	15	(Argentina) Darío Conca		(substituted off) 88'
RW	29	(China) Gao Lin		(substituted off) 68'
LW	11	(Brazil) Muriqui
CF	9	(Brazil) Cléo
Substitutes:
GK	22	(China) Li Shuai
DF	3	(Brazil) Paulão
DF	13	(China) Tang Dechao
MF	7	(China) Feng Junyan
MF	8	(China) Qin Sheng	(yellow card) 79'	(substituted on) 59'
MF	17	(China) Gao Zhilin
MF	26	(China) Wu Pingfeng		(substituted on) 88'
MF	33	(China) Li Yan
FW	21	(China) Jiang Ning		(substituted on) 68'
Coach:
(South Korea) Lee Jang-Soo

GK	1	(China) Song Zhenyu
RB	4	(Australia) Milan Susak		(substituted off) 60'
CB	5	(China) Li Weifeng
CB	29	(Romania) Lucian Goian
LB	14	(China) Bai Yuefeng
DM	42	(North Macedonia) Veliče Šumulikoski	(yellow card) 31'
DM	2	(China) He Yang		(substituted off) 46'
RM	26	(China) Cao Yang
LM	7	(China) Li Benjian		(substituted off) 77'
AM	10	(China) Wang Xinxin (c)
ST	36	(Netherlands) Sjoerd Ars
Substitutes:
GK	25	(China) Yang Qipeng
DF	19	(China) Nie Tao		(substituted on) 60'
DF	23	(China) Li Hongyang
MF	6	(China) Zhou Liao
MF	8	(China) Hu Rentian		(substituted on) 46'
MF	18	(China) Zheng Yi
MF	27	(China) Ma Leilei
FW	20	(China) Mao Biao		(substituted on) 77'
FW	41	(China) Fan Zhiqiang
Coach:
(Croatia) Josip Kuže

Assistant referees:
Su Jige (Beijing)
Huo Weiming (Beijing)

Fourth official:
Zhou Gang (Wuhan)

Chinese FA Super Cup
2012 Winners
Guangzhou Evergrande
First title

== See also ==
- 2011 Chinese Super League
- 2011 Chinese FA Cup
