= 2011 Asian Challenge Cup =

Annual football tournament in Hong Kong

2011 Asian Challenge Cup (Chinese: 亞洲超級球會挑戰盃) is the annual football event held in Hong Kong during the Lunar New Year. The name of this event in 2011 changed from Lunar New Year Cup to Asian Challenge Cup.

== Teams ==
Team	Country	League last season	Pos.
South China	Hong Kong	First Division	1st
Guangzhou Evergrande	China	League One	1st
Ulsan Hyundai	South Korea	K-League	4th
Tianjin Teda	China	Super League	2nd

== Squads ==
=== Guangzhou Evergrande ===
No.	Pos.	Player	Date of birth (age)	Caps	Club
1	GK	(China) Yang Jun	10 June 1981 (aged 29)	0	(China) Guangzhou Evergrande
2	DF	(China) Tu Dongxu	13 November 1991 (aged 19)	0	(China) Guangzhou Evergrande
3	MF	(China) Li Yan	19 July 1984 (aged 26)	136	(China) Guangzhou Evergrande
5	DF	(China) Zhang Linpeng	9 May 1989 (aged 21)	0	(China) Guangzhou Evergrande
7	MF	(China) Feng Junyan	18 February 1984 (aged 26)	181	(China) Guangzhou Evergrande
10	MF	(China) Zheng Zhi	20 August 1980 (aged 30)	11	(China) Guangzhou Evergrande
11	FW	(Brazil) Muriqui	16 June 1986 (aged 24)	14	(China) Guangzhou Evergrande
13	DF	(China) Tang Dechao	9 February 1985 (aged 25)	66	(China) Guangzhou Evergrande
14	DF	(China) Li Jianhua	12 February 1982 (aged 28)	52	(China) Guangzhou Evergrande
15	MF	(China) Hu Zhaojun	1 March 1981 (aged 29)	29	(China) Guangzhou Evergrande
17	MF	(China) Gao Zhilin	8 January 1991 (aged 20)	0	(China) Guangzhou Evergrande
18	DF	(China) Chen Jianlong	14 May 1989 (aged 21)	5	(China) Guangzhou Evergrande
19	MF	(China) Yang Hao	19 August 1983 (aged 27)	0	(China) Guangzhou Evergrande
22	GK	(China) Li Shuai	18 August 1982 (aged 28)	104	(China) Guangzhou Evergrande
23	MF	(China) Li Zhilang	22 August 1991 (aged 19)	12	(China) Guangzhou Evergrande
25	MF	(China) Yang Yihu	16 September 1991 (aged 19)	4	(China) Guangzhou Evergrande
26	MF	(China) Wu Pingfeng	1 November 1981 (aged 29)	79	(China) Guangzhou Evergrande
28	GK	(China) Zhi Xinhua	7 August 1987 (aged 23)	2	(China) Guangzhou Evergrande
29	FW	(China) Gao Lin	14 February 1986 (aged 24)	23	(China) Guangzhou Evergrande
30	MF	(China) Peng Shaoxiong	27 May 1989 (aged 21)	11	(China) Guangzhou Evergrande
32	DF	(China) Sun Xiang	15 January 1982 (aged 29)	14	(China) Guangzhou Evergrande
34	DF	(China) Huang Jiaqiang	14 March 1990 (aged 20)	0	(China) Guangzhou Evergrande
38	FW	(China) Ye Weichao	18 February 1989 (aged 21)	0	(China) Guangzhou Evergrande

=== South China ===
No.	Pos.	Player	Date of birth (age)	Caps	Club
1	GK	(Hong Kong) Yapp Hung Fai	21 March 1990 (aged 20)		(Hong Kong) South China
2	DF	(Hong Kong) Lee Chi Ho	16 November 1982 (aged 28)		(Hong Kong) South China
3	DF	(Hong Kong) Poon Yiu Cheuk	19 September 1977 (aged 33)		(Hong Kong) South China
4	DF	(Hong Kong) Chiu Chun Kit	4 October 1983 (aged 27)		(Hong Kong) South China
5	MF	(Hong Kong) Bai He	19 November 1983 (aged 27)		(Hong Kong) South China
6	DF	(Hong Kong) Wong Chin Hung	2 March 1982 (aged 28)		(Hong Kong) South China
7	FW	(Hong Kong) Chan Siu Ki	14 July 1985 (aged 25)		(Hong Kong) South China
9	MF	(Hong Kong) Lee Wai Lim	5 May 1981 (aged 29)		(Hong Kong) South China
10	MF	(Hong Kong) Au Yeung Yiu Chung	11 July 1989 (aged 21)		(Hong Kong) South China
11	MF	(Hong Kong) Li Haiqiang	3 May 1977 (aged 33)		(Hong Kong) South China
12	MF	(England) Nicky Butt	21 January 1975 (aged 36)		(Hong Kong) South China
14	DF	(Brazil) Joel	24 July 1980 (aged 30)		(Hong Kong) South China
15	DF	(Hong Kong) Chan Wai Ho	24 April 1982 (aged 28)		(Hong Kong) South China
16	MF	(Hong Kong) Leung Chun Pong	1 October 1986 (aged 24)		(Hong Kong) South China
17	FW	(Brazil) Giovane	25 November 1982 (aged 28)		(Hong Kong) South China
18	MF	(Hong Kong) Kwok Kin Pong	30 March 1987 (aged 23)		(Hong Kong) South China
20	DF	(Hong Kong) Lau Nim Yat	4 December 1989 (aged 21)		(Hong Kong) South China
21	MF	(Hong Kong) Man Pei Tak	16 February 1982 (aged 28)		(Hong Kong) South China
23	GK	(Hong Kong) Zhang Chunhui	13 March 1983 (aged 27)		(Hong Kong) South China
25	MF	(Brazil) Wellingsson de Souza	7 September 1989 (aged 21)		(Hong Kong) South China
31	FW	(Hong Kong) Cheng Lai Hin	31 March 1986 (aged 24)		(Hong Kong) South China
38	FW	(Serbia) Mateja Kežman	12 April 1979 (aged 31)		(Hong Kong) South China

=== Tianjin Teda ===
No.	Pos.	Player	Date of birth (age)	Caps	Club
1	GK	(China) Zhao Yanming	16 January 1981 (aged 30)		(China) Tianjin Teda
2	DF	(China) He Yang	23 February 1983 (aged 27)		(China) Tianjin Teda
3	MF	(China) Wu Weian	1 September 1981 (aged 29)		(China) Tianjin Teda
4	FW	(Nigeria) Obiora Odita	14 May 1983 (aged 27)		(China) Tianjin Teda
6	DF	(Serbia) Marko Zorić	10 July 1980 (aged 30)		(China) Tianjin Teda
7	MF	(China) Li Benjian	5 March 1986 (aged 24)		(China) Tianjin Teda
8	MF	(China) Hu Rentian	21 January 1991 (aged 20)		(China) Tianjin Teda
10	MF	(China) Wang Xinxin	27 April 1981 (aged 29)		(China) Tianjin Teda
15	DF	(China) Liao Bochao	16 July 1987 (aged 23)		(China) Tianjin Teda
16	MF	(China) Fan Boqun	18 February 1987 (aged 23)		(China) Tianjin Teda
20	FW	(China) Mao Biao	24 July 1987 (aged 23)		(China) Tianjin Teda
22	FW	(China) Yu Dabao	14 April 1988 (aged 22)		(China) Tianjin Teda
24	MF	(Australia) Gareth Edds	3 February 1981 (aged 30)		(Australia) North Queensland Fury
25	GK	(China) Yang Qipeng	14 May 1986 (aged 24)		(China) Tianjin Teda
26	DF	(China) Cao Yang	15 December 1981 (aged 29)		(China) Tianjin Teda
27	MF	(China) Ma Leilei	22 March 1989 (aged 21)		(China) Tianjin Teda
31	DF	(China) Bai Lei	25 May 1987 (aged 23)		(China) Tianjin Teda
32	FW	(China) Zhang Xiaobin	14 February 1985 (aged 25)		(China) Tianjin Teda
34	DF	(China) Li Weifeng	1 December 1978 (aged 32)		(China) Tianjin Teda

=== Ulsan Hyundai ===
No.	Pos.	Player	Date of birth (age)	Caps	Club
31	GK	(South Korea) Choi Mu-rim	15 April 1979 (aged 31)		(South Korea) Ulsan Hyundai
2	DF	(South Korea) Lee Yong	24 December 1986 (aged 24)		(South Korea) Ulsan Hyundai
3	MF	(South Korea) Kim Jong-guk			(South Korea) Ulsan Hyundai
4	DF	(South Korea) Kang Min-soo	14 February 1986 (aged 24)		(South Korea) Ulsan Hyundai
5	DF	(South Korea) Lim Jong-eun	18 June 1990 (aged 20)		(South Korea) Ulsan Hyundai
6	DF	(South Korea) Choi Jae-soo	2 May 1983 (aged 27)		(South Korea) Ulsan Hyundai
7	MF	(South Korea) Ko Chang-hyun	15 September 1983 (aged 27)		(South Korea) Ulsan Hyundai
8	FW	(South Korea) Go Seul-ki	21 April 1986 (aged 24)		(South Korea) Ulsan Hyundai
9	FW	(South Korea) Kim Shin-wook	14 April 1988 (aged 22)		(South Korea) Ulsan Hyundai
11	FW	(South Korea) Kim Da-bin	29 August 1989 (aged 21)		(South Korea) Ulsan Hyundai
13	DF	(South Korea) Kang Jin-ouk	13 February 1986 (aged 24)		(South Korea) Ulsan Hyundai
15	DF	(South Korea) Lee Jae-seong	5 July 1988 (aged 22)		(South Korea) Ulsan Hyundai
17	FW	(South Korea) Jung Dae-sun	27 June 1987 (aged 23)		(South Korea) Ulsan Hyundai
18	FW	(South Korea) Moon Dae-seong	15 March 1986 (aged 24)		(South Korea) Ulsan Hyundai
19	FW	(South Korea) Lee Jin-ho	3 September 1984 (aged 26)		(South Korea) Ulsan Hyundai
20	MF	(Colombia) Julián Estiven Vélez	9 February 1982 (aged 28)		(South Korea) Ulsan Hyundai
21	MF	(South Korea) Lee Ho	22 October 1984 (aged 26)		(South Korea) Ulsan Hyundai
22	DF	(South Korea) Choi Bo-gyeong			(South Korea) Ulsan Hyundai
30	FW	(South Korea) Kim Hyo-ki			(South Korea) Ulsan Hyundai
35	GK	(South Korea) Jeong Hong-seok			(South Korea) Ulsan Hyundai

== Results ==
=== Semi-finals ===
2011-02-18
15:00

Ulsan Hyundai (South Korea)	0–4	(China) Tianjin Teda
	Report	Wang Xinxin 25'; Zorić 38', 63'; Odita 71'

Hong Kong Stadium
Attendance: 11,088
Referee: Yudai Yamamoto
2011-02-18
17:30

South China (Hong Kong)	0–1	(China) Guangzhou Evergrande
	Report	Muriqui 68'

Hong Kong Stadium
Attendance: 11,088
Referee: Hiroyoshi Takayama

=== Third place match ===
2011-02-21
15:00 (UTC+08:00)

South China (Hong Kong)	2–4	(South Korea) Ulsan Hyundai
Chan Siu Ki 49'; Cheng Lai Hin 88'	Report	Ko Chang-hyun 48' (pen.), 71'; Choi Jae-soo 73', 90+1'

Hong Kong Stadium
Attendance: 11,348
Referee: Yudai Yamamoto

=== Final ===
2011-02-21
17:30 (UTC+08:00)

Guangzhou Evergrande (China)	0–0	(China) Tianjin Teda
	Report
Penalties
Muriqui (penalty scored); Gao Lin (penalty scored); Zhang Linpeng (penalty missed); Li Yan (penalty scored)	3–5	(penalty scored) Cao Yang; (penalty scored) Wang Xinxin; (penalty scored) Wu Weian; (penalty scored) Zorić; (penalty scored) Li Benjian

Hong Kong Stadium
Attendance: 11,348
Referee: Hiroyoshi Takayama
