= Yang (given name) =

Yang is a given name, and may refer to:

- An Yang (born 1984), Chinese pair skater
- Bai Yang (actress) (1920–1996), Chinese actress
- Bai Yang (table tennis) (born 1984), Chinese table tennis player
- Bai Yang (footballer) (born 1998), Chinese footballer
- Cao Yang (born 1981), Chinese international football player
- Fan Yang (artist) (born 1962), Canadian bubble artist
- Fan Yang (cyclist) (born 1990), Chinese track cyclist
- Emperor Wenxuan of Northern Qi, named Gao Yang
- Gao Yang (shot putter), shot putter
- Gao Yang (politician), former president of the Central Party School of the Chinese Communist Party
- Gao Yang (speed skater)
- Gao Yang (snooker player)
- He Yang (born 1983), former Chinese international footballer
- Jin Yang (born 1994), Chinese male pair skater
- Li Yang (director) (born 1959), Chinese film director
- Li Yang (educator) (born 1969), Chinese educator and founder of Crazy English
- Yang Li (fashion designer) (born 1987), UK-based fashion designer
- Li Yang (rower) (born 1978), Chinese Olympic rower
- Li Yang (ski jumper) (born 1980), Chinese ski jumper
- Li Yang (boxer) (born 1982), Chinese amateur featherweight boxer
- Li Yang (sport shooter) (born 1985), Chinese sports shooter
- Lee Yang (born 1995), Taiwanese badminton player
- Li Yang, former name of Geng Xiaoshun (born 1990), Chinese footballer
- Li Yang (footballer, born 1997), Chinese male footballer
- Li Yang (footballer, born 1999), Chinese male footballer
- Lu Yang, Chinese film director and screenwriter
- Lu Yang (footballer), Chinese footballer who currently plays for Chengdu Better City
- Lü Yang, Chinese rower
- Luo Yang (aircraft designer), Chinese aircraft designer (1961–2012)
- Luo Yang (photographer), Chinese photographer (born 1984)
- Shi Yang, Chinese lawyer
- Shi Yang (swimmer), Chinese swimmer
- Wang Yang (politician) (born 1955), Chairman of the National Committee of the Chinese People's Political Consultative Conference
- Wang Yang (Liaoning politician) (born 1957), former provincial official from Liaoning
- Wang Yang (general) (汪洋; 1920–2001), Chinese general and government minister
- Wang Yang (water polo) (born 1983), Chinese water polo player
- Wang Yang (footballer, born 1982), Chinese football player best known for his career at Jiangsu Sainty
- Wang Yang (footballer, born 1989), Chinese football player who currently plays for Hebei Zhongji
- Wang Yang (footballer, born 1991), Chinese football player
- Wang Yang (footballer, born 1993), Chinese football player who currently plays for Hangzhou Greentown
- Wang Yang (high jumper) (born 1989), Chinese high jumper
- Wang Yang (table tennis) (born 1994), Slovak table tennis player
- Jimmy Wang Yang (born 1981), American-born Korean wrestler
- Yang Wang (sport shooter) (born 1976), New Zealand sport shooter
- Wang Yang (sailor), Chinese sailor
- Wang Yang (wheelchair racer), Paralympic wheelchair racer
- Yang Yang (painter) (born 1953), Chinese-born American artist and sculptor
- Yang Yang (conductor) (born 1973), Chinese conductor with Hangzhou Philharmonic Orchestra
- Yang Yang (tenor) (1974/75 – 2019), Chinese tenor
- Yang Yang (actor) (born 1991), Chinese actor
- Yang Yang (director), Chinese director, see Golden Eagle Award for Best Television Series Director (China)#Winners and nominees
- Yang Yang (badminton) (born 1963), Chinese badminton player
- Yang Yang (baseball) (born 1986), Chinese baseball player
- Yang Yang (speed skater, born 1976), Chinese speed skater, Olympic gold medalist
- Yang Yang (speed skater, born 1977), Chinese speed skater, Olympic silver medalist
- Yang Yang (sprinter) (born 1991), Chinese sprinter
- Yang Yang (swimmer) (born 1997), Chinese Paralympic swimmer
- Yang Yang (scientist) (born 1958), Taiwanese-born materials scientist at University of California, Los Angeles
- Yu Yang (field hockey) (born 1979), Chinese field hockey player
- Yu Yang (badminton) (born 1986), Chinese female badminton player
- Yu Yang (footballer, born 1989), Chinese football player
- Yu Yang (footballer, born 1983), Chinese former football player
- Zhang Yang (warlord) (died 198), Chinese warlord of the late Han Dynasty
- Zhang Yang (director) (born 1967), Chinese film director
- Zhang Yang (general) (1951–2017), Chinese general in the People's Liberation Army

== See also ==
- Yang (surname)
- Yang Jian (disambiguation)
- Yang Jing (disambiguation)
