= Akpo Sodje =

English footballer

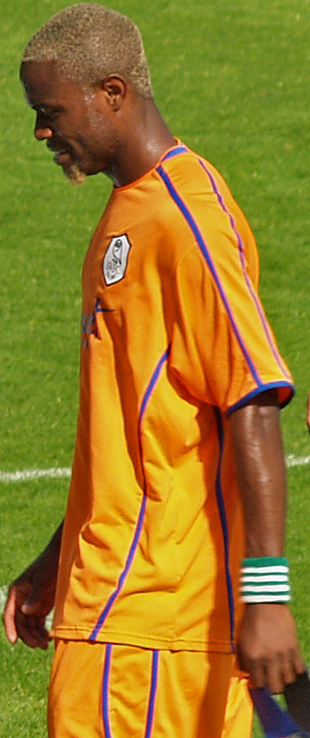
- Sodje playing for Sheffield Wednesday

Personal information
- Full name: Idoro Akpoeyere Ujoma Sodje
- Date of birth: 31 January 1980 (age 46)
- Place of birth: Greenwich, London, England
- Height: 6 ft 2 in (1.88 m)
- Position: Centre forward

Youth career
- Dynamos

Senior career*
Years	Team	Apps	(Gls)
2001	Queens Park Rangers	0	(0)
2001	→ Stevenage Borough (loan)	3	(1)
2001–2002	Margate	17	(3)
2002	Gravesend & Northfleet	7	(2)
2002–2003	Heybridge Swifts	31	(7)
2003–2004	Erith & Belvedere	21	(18)
2004–2005	Huddersfield Town	7	(0)
2005	→ Darlington (loan)	7	(1)
2005–2006	Darlington	36	(8)
2006–2007	Port Vale	46	(14)
2007–2010	Sheffield Wednesday	41	(9)
2009–2010	→ Charlton Athletic (loan)	9	(2)
2010	→ Charlton Athletic (loan)	17	(3)
2010–2011	Charlton Athletic	15	(1)
2011–2012	Hibernian	28	(6)
2012	Tianjin TEDA	10	(1)
2012	Preston North End	14	(4)
2013	Scunthorpe United	16	(6)
2013–2014	Tranmere Rovers	9	(0)
2014	→ Macclesfield Town (loan)	5	(0)
Total		339	(86)
- * Club domestic league appearances and goals

Idoro Akpoeyere Ujoma "Akpo" Sodje (born 31 January 1980) is an English former professional footballer. A journeyman striker, he is known for his colourful hairstyles.

With Queens Park Rangers in 2001, he was loaned out to Stevenage Borough, before beginning a career in non-League football with Margate in 2001. He moved on to Heybridge Swifts via Gravesend & Northfleet the following year before joining Erith & Belvedere in 2003. He rejoined the Football League with Huddersfield Town in 2004 before joining Darlington the next year after a successful loan spell. He spent the 2006–07 season with Port Vale before becoming a Sheffield Wednesday player. He found success and popularity at both clubs before he joined Charlton Athletic in 2010 after two loan spells. He moved into Scottish football with Hibernian in 2011 before departing in January 2012. Two months later, he emigrated to China to sign with Tianjin TEDA to become the first English footballer in the Chinese Super League. He returned to the English game in August 2012, when he joined Preston North End for a brief spell. He joined Scunthorpe United on a short-term basis in January 2013 before signing with Tranmere Rovers in July 2013. He was loaned to Macclesfield Town in February 2014.

After three of his brothers, Efe, Bright and Stephen Sodje, were sentenced to 18, 21 and 30 months in prison, respectively, for fraud in September 2017 (having siphoned off money from a charity, the Sodje Sports Foundation), a European Arrest Warrant was issued concerning Akpo.

== Family sporting connections ==
Born in Greenwich, London, his family originate from Warri, in Delta State, Nigeria. Sodje has four brothers who also play football; three of them professionally and one semi-professionally. Sam and Efe have represented Nigeria at international level. Steve has never played a Football League game. Another brother, Bright, used to play rugby league and rugby union. His cousin Onome Sodje, also played professionally in England. His nephew, Tai, son of Bright, also became a professional footballer.

Akpo is the youngest of the ten Sodje children:

"I am very proud to come from the Sodje family, which is a very big family. I want to thank our dad and mum for the sacrifices they made in bringing us up. We are all very close, Bright, Sam, Efe, and the rest. I am number 10 among the children, and they all treat me as their pet because I am the youngest member of the family."

In January 2019 it was reported that Akpo refused to return to Britain for questioning by police in a money laundering investigation into his family's business that saw three of his brothers jailed.

== Career ==
=== Early career ===
"When I was playing in Warri, I started as a defender. The coach whom I played under said I was fast and tall, and because of these qualities he saw in me, he converted me to a striker... I started playing in England when I was just about seven years old, and as I was growing up, I started from the lower divisions."

— Sodje explains his early career.

He was signed to First Division Queens Park Rangers. However, he never made an appearance, he was loaned out to Conference National club Stevenage Borough in March 2001. He scored on his first outing for the club, in a 2–1 win at Morecambe on 31 March, replacing Darran Hay on 36 minutes.

He was still with Stevenage for the start of the 2001–02 season, getting sent off against Doncaster Rovers on 27 August. He left Broadhall Way the next month for Margate, making 16 appearances before the season's end, scoring goals against Yeovil Town, Woking and Hayes.

He began 2002–03 with Margate, playing in their 2–0 defeat at Leigh Genesis on 31 August. The next month, he joined Gravesend & Northfleet, scoring on his debut on the 7th in a 4–1 home win over Nuneaton Borough. Seven days later, he scored against Forest Green Rovers before he made his final appearance on 2 November, getting sent off in a 2–1 defeat at Halifax Town. He was released later in the month and had spells with virtual unknowns Heybridge Swifts (Isthmian League) and Erith & Belvedere (Southern Football League).

At age 24 (at the time, he was often reported as 22 or 23), he got a second chance at a professional career, joining Huddersfield Town of League One. He was handed a three-month deal in September 2004, his foot in the door because his brother Efe was captain of the club. He replaced Andy Booth 86 minutes into a 3–0 win at Vale Park on 11 September, Pawel Abbott grabbing the headlines with a hat-trick. In November his contract was extended by six months, allowing him further time to impress boss Peter Jackson. In all he made nine appearances for the "Terriers" in 2004–05, getting just two starts and impressing only in the reserves. In March 2005 he was loaned out to League Two Darlington, after impressing on trial, and scored in the final moments of the season in a 3–1 home win over Cheltenham Town. He was released by Huddersfield in May.

He spent 2005–06 with Darlington. He made 39 appearances, scoring eight goals, including a hat-trick at Chester City in a 4–4 draw on 27 August. His performances caught the eye of Port Vale's manager Martin Foyle, who won his signature in May 2006.

=== Port Vale ===
On 5 August 2006, his prolific strike partnership with Leon Constantine had begun – Constantine scoring a brace and Sodje putting the third past Leyton Orient in a 3–0 win. He scored the only goal at Boundary Park three days later. The pair teamed up to put one each past Preston North End in the League Cup; by the season's end, the pair had 42 goals, 16 coming from Sodje. On 10 March 2007, he also became the first Port Vale player to score four goals in an away league match since Lewis Campbell in 1893, as Vale completed a 5–1 victory at Millmoor against Rotherham United. His hat-trick came in just 18 minutes to break a spell of eight games without scoring. Awarded with the player of the year award, he stated his aim of trying to beat Constantine's 26 goals last season and try to get Vale into the Championship in 2007–08.

=== Sheffield Wednesday ===
Vale sold Sodje for an undisclosed fee (later reported to be £300,000) in August 2007. The player signed a three-year contract with Sheffield Wednesday. The bid (believed to be around £300,000) was made after Sodje was placed on the transfer list, at his own request. At the same time, Wednesday were also attempting to buy Sam from Reading, though the deal did not go through.

He made his debut by coming on as a substitute for Jermaine Johnson in the 63rd minute on 1 September 2007 at Hillsborough, against Bristol City in a 1–0 loss. His full debut came in another 1–0 loss against Preston at Deepdale on 15 September. He scored his first goal for the club on 3 November away at Plymouth Argyle in the 52nd minute to help his club win 2–1. After not scoring in his first six starts and two substitute appearances, his first goal spurred him on to score a total of seven league goals in 16 starts and three substitute appearances in his first season at the club, including a brace in a 5–0 victory over Southampton on 10 November. After being hailed by some Wednesdayites as "The black David Hirst" because of his strength and determination, Sodje cemented his place in Wednesday folklore with the opening goal in their 2–0 win over fierce rivals Sheffield United on 19 January. Unfortunately for his new fans, his season was cut short by an ankle injury in February. Despite this setback, he was still voted striker of the year by fans of the club.

Sodje started the 2008–09 season by scoring two goals and setting one up for strike partner Marcus Tudgay in a 4–1 win over Burnley. However, he also picked up a hamstring injury in the match and had to be substituted after just 21 minutes. He made his return coming off of the bench for Jermaine Johnson after 68 minutes against local rivals Sheffield United. Injury limited him to only nine further appearances that season. He picked up a hamstring injury in April.

=== Charlton Athletic ===
On 14 November, Sodje joined his brother Sam at Charlton Athletic. Initially signed on a 28-day emergency loan, this signing was made with an option of making the deal permanent. He made his debut on the same day, coming on for Dave Mooney. Sodje scored at Yeovil Town seven days after his brother was sent off. On 31 January 2010, he returned to Charlton Athletic on loan until the end of the season. On 20 May 2010, Sodje signed a permanent deal with the Addicks after participating in enough games to activate a clause in his loan deal. Sodje mainly appeared for Charlton as a substitute during the 2010–11 season. His only goal this season came on the opening day in a 1–0 victory for Charlton over AFC Bournemouth.

=== Hibernian ===
Sodje signed for Scottish Premier League (SPL) side Hibernian on a free transfer on 31 January 2011. He made his debut two days later, setting up the opening goal in a 2–0 win against St Mirren. Sodje scored his first goal for the club in their next game, a 2–1 win over Kilmarnock. Sodje scored six goals for Hibs in the latter part of the 2010–11 season, as well as winning a penalty in an Edinburgh derby which saw opposing player Marius Žaliūkas sent off, but became a squad player in the following season. In January 2012, Hibs allowed Sodje to join Belgian club K.V.C. Westerlo on trial, and then released him from his contract on 31 January.

=== Tianjin Teda ===
In March 2012, he signed a contract with Chinese Super League side Tianjin TEDA, then managed by Josip Kuže. The club represent the city of Tianjin, and play at the 37,450 capacity TEDA Football Stadium. The league restricts clubs to sign at most five non-Chinese players, the other four in 2012 being Lucian Goian, Sjoerd Ars, Veliče Šumulikoski, and Milan Susak. He scored his first and only goal for Tianjin on 16 March in a 2–1 defeat by Qingdao Jonoon at Qingdao Tiantai Stadium. On 1 July, Sodje was released by Tianjin TEDA.

=== Preston North End ===
In August 2012, Sodje signed for Preston North End, having impressed with four goals in three games during pre-season. He won a first-team place after coming off the bench to score against Bournemouth, and then followed this up with goals against Crystal Palace and Swindon Town in his next two games. Following an impressive start to his career at Deepdale, Sodje signed for a second-month. He then signed another contract, to remain at Preston for a third month. However, he refused to stay at the club beyond December, leaving his final tally at seven goals in 17 appearances.

=== Scunthorpe United ===
Sodje signed with Scunthorpe United in January 2013 on a short-term deal lasting until the end of the 2012–13 season and stated that "I'm feeling good and I'm glad that everything is sorted and I've got the chance to work with Brian Laws again... There's no doubt that we'll be able to stay up. We've been having a bad time but that is all changing now." After three away games, he marked his debut at Glanford Park with two goals in a 2–1 win over Portsmouth. He hit six goals in 16 games as the "Iron" were relegated into League Two, and was released in the summer.

=== Tranmere Rovers ===
In July 2013, Sodje signed a one-year contract with Ronnie Moore's Tranmere Rovers. He made eleven appearances without scoring a goal at the start of the 2013–14 season.

On 20 February 2014, Sodje joined Conference side Macclesfield Town on a one-month loan; brother Efe was manager John Askey's assistant at the "Silkmen". He played five games for the "Silkmen" without scoring. Tranmere Rovers released him after returning to Prenton Park in April.

== Style of play ==
Sodje was an energetic, strong and aggressive forward.

== Personal life ==
Sodje was named by a report into the 2013 English football match-fixing scandal although no charges were brought.

Two of his brothers, Sam and Efe, were put on trial in the UK in September 2017 for money laundering after allegedly being involved in channelling proceeds from scams which targeted firms in Colombia, India, Italy and Abu Dhabi; Sodje himself was also alleged to have taken part in the crime but declined to return to Britain from his home in Dubai to be interviewed by police.

In September 2017, Efe, Bright and Stephen Sodje were sentenced to 18, 21 and 30 months in prison for fraud, having siphoned off money from a charity, the Sodje Sports Foundation. Akpo, 37, is wanted in connection with the fraud, and a European Arrest Warrant has been issued.

== Career statistics ==
Appearances and goals by club, season and competition
Club	Season	League			National cup (Note: Includes FA Cup, Scottish Cup, Chinese FA Cup)		League cup (Note: Includes Football League Cup, Scottish League Cup)		Other		Total	
Club	Season	Division	Apps	Goals	Apps	Goals	Apps	Goals	Apps	Goals	Apps	Goals
Queens Park Rangers	2000–01	First Division	0	0	0	0	0	0	0	0	0	0
Stevenage Borough (loan)	2000–01	Conference Premier	1	1	—		—		—		1	1
Stevenage Borough (loan)	2001–02	Conference Premier	2	0	0	0	—		0	0	2	0
Stevenage Borough (loan)	Total		3	1	0	0	0	0	0	0	3	1
Margate	2001–02	Conference Premier	16	3	0	0	—		1 (Note: Appearance(s) in the FA Trophy.)	0	17	3
Margate	2002–03	Conference Premier	1	0	0	0	—		0	0	1	0
Margate	Total		17	3	0	0	0	0	1	0	18	3
Gravesend & Northfleet	2002–03	Conference Premier	7	2	0	0	—		0	0	7	2
Heybridge Swifts	2002–03	Isthmian League	31	7	0	0	—		0	0	31	7
Erith & Belvedere	2003–04	Southern Div. 1 East	21	18	0	0	—		0	0	21	18
Huddersfield Town	2004–05	League One	7	0	0	0	—		0	0	7	0
Darlington	2004–05	League Two	7	1	—		—		—		7	1
Darlington	2005–06	League Two	36	8	1	0	1	0	1 (Note: Appearance(s) in the EFL Trophy.)	0	39	8
Darlington	Total		43	9	1	0	1	0	1	0	46	9
Port Vale	2006–07	League One	43	14	1	1	4	1	2	0	50	16
Port Vale	2007–08	League One	3	0	0	0	0	0	0	0	3	0
Port Vale	Total		46	14	1	1	4	1	2	0	53	16
Sheffield Wednesday	2007–08	Championship	19	7	1	0	1	0	—		21	7
Sheffield Wednesday	2008–09	Championship	11	2	0	0	0	0	—		11	2
Sheffield Wednesday	2009–10	Championship	11	0	0	0	1	0	—		12	0
Sheffield Wednesday	Total		41	9	1	0	2	0	0	0	44	9
Charlton Athletic	2009–10	League One	26	5	—		—		—		26	5
Charlton Athletic	2010–11	League One	15	1	4	0	1	0	1	0	21	1
Charlton Athletic	Total		41	6	4	0	1	0	1	0	47	6
Hibernian	2010–11	SPL	15	6	—		—		—		15	6
Hibernian	2011–12	SPL	13	0	1	0	2	1	0	0	16	1
Hibernian	Total		28	6	1	0	2	1	0	0	31	7
Tianjin TEDA	2012	Chinese Super League	10	1	0	0	—		0	0	10	1
Preston North End	2012–13	League One	14	4	0	0	1	1	2	2	17	7
Scunthorpe United	2012–13	League One	16	6	—		—		—		16	6
Tranmere Rovers	2013–14	League One	9	0	0	0	1	0	1	0	11	0
Macclesfield Town (loan)	2013–14	Conference Premier	5	0	—		—		—		5	0
Career total (Note: non-League statistics prior to 2004 may be incomplete.)			339	86	8	1	12	3	8	2	367	92

== Honours ==
- Port Vale F.C. Player of the Year: 2007
- Sheffield Wednesday Striker of the Year: 2008
