= 洋 =

洋, meaning "ocean", is an Asian given name.

It may refer to:

- Hiroshi, Japanese masculine given name
- Yang, Chinese masculine given name
- Yō, Japanese masculine given name

== See also ==
- Yang (disambiguation)
- Yo (disambiguation)
