= Yangjing =

Yangjing may refer to these places in China:

- Yangjing Subdistrict in Pudong District, Shanghai
- Yangjing, Shaanxi in Dingbian County, Shaanxi

== See also ==
- Yang Jing (disambiguation)
