= Li Hongyang =

Li Hongyang may refer to:

- Li Hongyang (footballer), Chinese footballer.
- Li Hongyang (rhythmic gymnast), Chinese rhythmic gymnast.
