= Cheng Lai Hin =

Hong Kong footballer

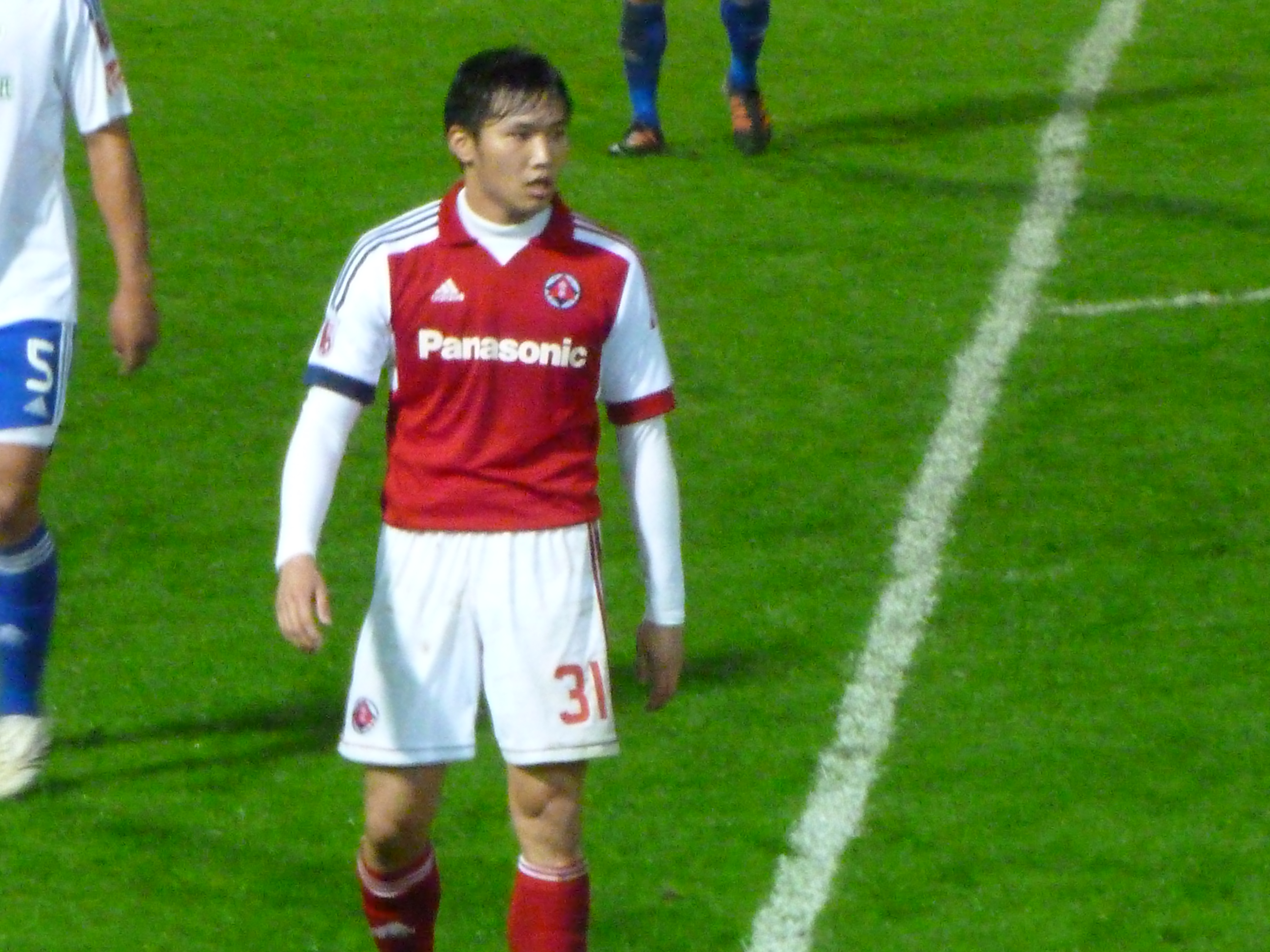

Personal information
- Full name: Michael Cheng Lai Hin
- Date of birth: 31 March 1986 (age 40)
- Place of birth: Hong Kong
- Height: 1.80 m (5 ft 11 in)
- Position: Striker

Youth career
- Hong Kong Rangers

Senior career*
Years	Team	Apps	(Gls)
2004–2010	Kitchee	37	(5)
2005	→ Xiangxue Pharmaceutical (loan)	6	(2)
2005–2006	→ Hong Kong 08 (loan)	14	(2)
2006–2007	→ HKFC (loan)	12	(2)
2010–2015	South China	42	(6)
2015–2016	Pegasus	11	(0)
2016–2017	Double Flower	4	(3)
2018–2019	Happy Valley	9	(0)
2019–2021	Double Flower	24	(9)
2021–2022	Heng Wah	0	(0)
2022–2023	Tsuen Wan	0	(0)
2023–2024	St. Joseph's	14	(9)
2024–2025	Ravia		

International career
2006	Hong Kong U-23		
2010–2011	Hong Kong	9	(1)
Medal record
Representing Hong Kong
East Asian Games
Gold medal – first place	2009 Hong Kong	Football
- * Club domestic league appearances and goals as of 16 May 2026

Michael Cheng Lai Hin (Chinese: 鄭禮騫; Cantonese Yale: Jehng Láihhīn; born 31 March 1986) is a former Hong Kong professional footballer who played as a striker.

Cheng was arrested by the ICAC on match fixing charges in 2017 but was subsequently cleared.

== Club career ==
=== Kitchee ===
Cheng Lai Hin signed for Kitchee when he was only 18.

Cheng Lai Hin was one of the torch bearers for Hong Kong for the 2008 Olympic torch relay in the SAR.

On 29 November 2008, in the 2008-09 Hong Kong Senior Challenge Shield semi-final, Cheng Lai Hin came on as a substitute and scored Kitchee's second goal, but Kitchee still lost to Sun Hei SC.

On 31 May 2010, in the 2010 Singapore Cup, Cheng Lai Hin scored at the 111-minute, from a Lo Kwan Yee corner against Beijing Guoan Talent. His goal helped Kitchee win the match 2:1 and proceed to the quarter finals.

=== South China ===
On 8 June 2010, Cheng Lai Hin signed for South China in 2010, following the footsteps of Chan Siu Ki. He left Kitchee because coach Josep Gombau did not think he fitted Kitchee's 4–3–3 formation. He joined South China expecting to be only a reserve to replace the departing Chao Pengfei. South China's Steven Lo compared Cheng favourably to Jong Tae Se of North Korea but Cheng himself played down the expectations.

In the 2010-11 Hong Kong Senior Challenge Shield semi-final against Tai Po FC, Cheng Lai Hin scored twice to help South China win 3:0 and advance to the final.

In the 2011 Asian Challenge Cup, Cheng Lai Hin came on as a substitute against Ulsan Hyundai in the third place play-off and scored South China's second goal. But South China lost the match 2:4 to finish last.

In the 2011 AFC Cup away game to East Bengal FC, Cheng Lai Hin scored the second goal for South China, his first goal in the competition, at the 87-minute. The match ended 3:3.

In the crucial away leg to Persipura Jayapura, a 2011 AFC Cup game, Chan Siu Ki was suspended and Cheng Lai Hin was required to partner Mateja Kezman up front. Kezman claimed he was confident of the partnership with Cheng. But in the end South China lost the match 2:4 and any chance to qualify for the second phase.

In his first season at South China, Cheng Lai Hin finished as the top scorer of the club by scoring a total of 7 goals in all local competitions, despite being not a regular starting member, 1 more than Mateja Kezman and 2 more than regular starter Chan Siu Ki.

=== Pegasus ===
Cheng joined Pegasus in the summer of 2015.

== International career ==
On 20 June 2010, Cheng Lai Hin scored a hat-trick for Hong Kong national football team in the 2010 Hong Kong–Macau Interport. His goals helped Hong Kong win the match 5–1 and claimed the Interport Trophy. On 30 September 2011, Cheng Lai-Hin scored the second goal in the 3:3 draw with the Philippines in the 2011 Long Teng Cup.

== Match Fixing Scandal ==
On 6 October 2016, Cheng was one of six current and former Pegasus players to be taken in for questioning by the ICAC on allegations of match fixing. He was formally charged on 28 June 2017 for conspiracy to defraud and offering an advantage to an agent.

On 19 April 2018, Cheng was found not guilty of both charges after the judge ruled that he could not convict him beyond a reasonable doubt.

== Honours ==
=== Club ===
Happy Valley

- Hong Kong First Division: 2018–19

=== International ===
Hong Kong

- 2009 East Asian Games Football Event: Gold

== Career statistics ==
=== Club ===
As of 6 December 2006

Club	Season	League		League Cup		Senior Shield		FA Cup		AFC Cup		Total	
Club	Season	Apps	Goals	Apps	Goals	Apps	Goals	Apps	Goals	Apps	Goals	Apps	Goals
Kitchee	2003–04	?	?	?	?	?	?	—	—	—	—	?	?
Kitchee	Total							—	—	—	—		
Xiangxue Pharmaceutical (loan)	2003–04	?	?	—	—	?	?	?	?	—	—	?	?
Xiangxue Pharmaceutical (loan)	Total			—	—					—	—		
Hong Kong 08 (loan)	2005–06	?	?	?	?	1	0	1	1	—	—	?	?
Hong Kong 08 (loan)	Total					1	0	1	1	—	—		
HKFC (loan)	2006–07	6(4)	2	4	1	0(1)	0	0	0	0	0	10(5)	3
HKFC (loan)	Total									—	—		
Career Total										—	—		

=== International ===
As of 5 October 2011

#	Date	Venue	Opponent	Result	Scored	Competition
1	6 January 2010	Bahrain National Stadium, Riffa	Bahrain	0–4	0	2011 AFC Asian Cup qualification
2	14 February 2010	Olympic Stadium, Tokyo	China	0–2	0	2010 East Asian Football Championship
3	3 March 2010	Hong Kong Stadium, Hong Kong	Yemen	0–0	0	2011 AFC Asian Cup qualification
4	17 November 2010	Hong Kong Stadium, Hong Kong	Paraguay	0–7	0	Friendly
5	9 February 2011	Shah Alam Stadium, Kuala Lumpur	Malaysia	0–2	0	Friendly
6	30 September 2011	Kaohsiung National Stadium, Kaohsiung	Philippines	3–3	1	2011 Long Teng Cup
7	2 October 2011	Kaohsiung National Stadium, Kaohsiung	Macau	5–1	0	2011 Long Teng Cup
8	4 October 2011	Kaohsiung National Stadium, Kaohsiung	Chinese Taipei	6–0	0	2011 Long Teng Cup
