= Hui Jiakang =

Chinese footballer (born 1989)

Hui Jiakang 惠家康
Personal information
- Date of birth: 31 August 1989 (age 37)
- Place of birth: Shenyang, Liaoning, China
- Height: 1.80 m (5 ft 11 in)
- Positions: Left winger; attacking midfielder

Senior career*
Years	Team	Apps	(Gls)
2008	Shenzhen Xiangxue Eisiti	13	(0)
2009	Ferencvárosi	0	(0)
2010–2011	Chengdu Blades	35	(1)
2012–2020	Tianjin Teda	133	(9)
2021–2022	Changchun Yatai	12	(0)
2024	Liaoning Tieren	7	(1)
Total		200	(11)

International career^{‡}
2008	China U20	3	(1)
2008–2017	China	3	(0)
- * Club domestic league appearances and goals as of 5 August 2022 ‡ National team caps and goals as of 14 January 2017

Hui Jiakang
- Chinese: 惠家康
Transcriptions
Standard Mandarin
- Hanyu Pinyin: Huì Jiākāng
- IPA: [xwêɪ tɕjá kʰáŋ]

Hui Jiakang (Chinese: 惠家康; pinyin: Huì Jiākāng; born August 31, 1989, in Shenyang) is a former Chinese professional footballer.

== Club career ==
Hui Jiakang started his football career after graduating from the Shenzhen youth team in 2008. He quickly established himself within the Senior Shenzhen Xiangxue team after he made his debut against Shandong Luneng in a 2–1 defeat on July 5, in the 2008 Chinese Super League season. At the end of the season, Hui Jiakang played thirteen league games and his club wanted to offer him a new long term-contract, however, he was dropped from the team after there was a dispute about pay with his new contract at the beginning of the 2009 football league season. Shenzhen held him to his remaining contract while the Chinese Football Association stipulated that Hui Jiakang is still contractually obliged to Shenzhen and cannot transfer unless it is to a foreign team.

Without any football for a whole season, he went off to train with Hungarian side Ferencvárosi TC until Chinese second-tier side Chengdu Blades took him at the beginning of the 2010 league season where he made his debut against Nanjing Yoyo on April 4, 2010, in a 3–0 victory. Throughout the season he would then play in fourteen league games as he aided the club to a runners-up spot within the division and promotion back into the top tier. The following season would see Hui back into the top tier where despite being a regular within the team he could not prevent the team finishing within the relegation zone at the end of the 2011 Chinese Super League season.

=== Tianjin TEDA ===
Following Chengdu's relegation, Hui joined fellow Chinese Super League club Tianjin Teda in 2012, and despite a difficult start, went on to establish himself as one of the club's iconic players of the decade. On 7 March 2012, he made his debut for the club in their opening game of the 2012 AFC Champions League group stage, a 0-0 home draw against Central Coast Mariners. On 25 June 2016, he finally scored his first goal for the club after 4 years, in a 1-1 away draw at Shanghai SIPG. On 28 April 2018, he made his 100th appearance for the club in a 1-0 home defeat against Beijing Renhe.

=== Changchun Yatai ===
On 13 April 2021, Hui joined fellow Chinese Super League club Changchun Yatai. He made his debut in a league game for Yatai on 22 April 2021, in a 2–1 win against Dalian Professional.

On 30 January 2024, Hui joined China League One club Liaoning Shenyang Urban.

== International career ==
Hui Jiankang graduated through the Chinese U-20 team that took part in the AFC Youth Championship in 2008, where he played in 3 matches and scored 1 goal. Hui Jiakang would then graduate to senior side and made his debut in a 2008 friendly against Iran in a 2–0 loss coming on as a substitute. He made his second appearance for China nine years later on 10 January 2017 in the 2017 China Cup against Iceland.

== Career statistics ==
Statistics accurate as of match played 5 August 2022.

Appearances and goals by club, season and competition
Club	Season	League			National Cup		Continental		Other		Total	
Club	Season	Division	Apps	Goals	Apps	Goals	Apps	Goals	Apps	Goals	Apps	Goals
Shenzhen	2008	Chinese Super League	13	0	-		-		-		13	0
Ferencvárosi	2009-10	Nemzeti Bajnokság I	0	0	0	0	-		-		0	0
Chengdu Blades	2010	China League One	16	0	-		-		-		16	0
Chengdu Blades	2011	Chinese Super League	19	1	1	0	-		-		20	1
Chengdu Blades	Total		35	1	1	0	0	0	0	0	36	1
Tianjin Teda	2012	Chinese Super League	16	0	0	0	5	0	-		21	0
Tianjin Teda	2013	Chinese Super League	7	0	0	0	-		-		7	0
Tianjin Teda	2014	Chinese Super League	9	0	1	0	-		-		10	0
Tianjin Teda	2015	Chinese Super League	5	0	0	0	-		-		5	0
Tianjin Teda	2016	Chinese Super League	23	2	1	0	-		-		24	2
Tianjin Teda	2017	Chinese Super League	25	0	0	0	-		-		25	0
Tianjin Teda	2018	Chinese Super League	21	6	0	0	-		-		21	6
Tianjin Teda	2019	Chinese Super League	12	0	0	0	-		-		12	0
Tianjin Teda	2020	Chinese Super League	15	1	4	0	-		-		19	1
Tianjin Teda	Total		133	9	6	0	5	0	0	0	144	9
Changchun Yatai	2021	Chinese Super League	11	0	2	0	-		-		13	0
Changchun Yatai	2022	Chinese Super League	1	0	0	0	-		-		1	0
Changchun Yatai	Total		12	0	2	0	0	0	0	0	14	0
Liaoning Shenyang Urban	2024	China League One	0	0	0	0	-		-		0	0
Career total			193	10	9	0	5	0	0	0	207	10
