= Cléo =

Brazilian footballer (born 1985)

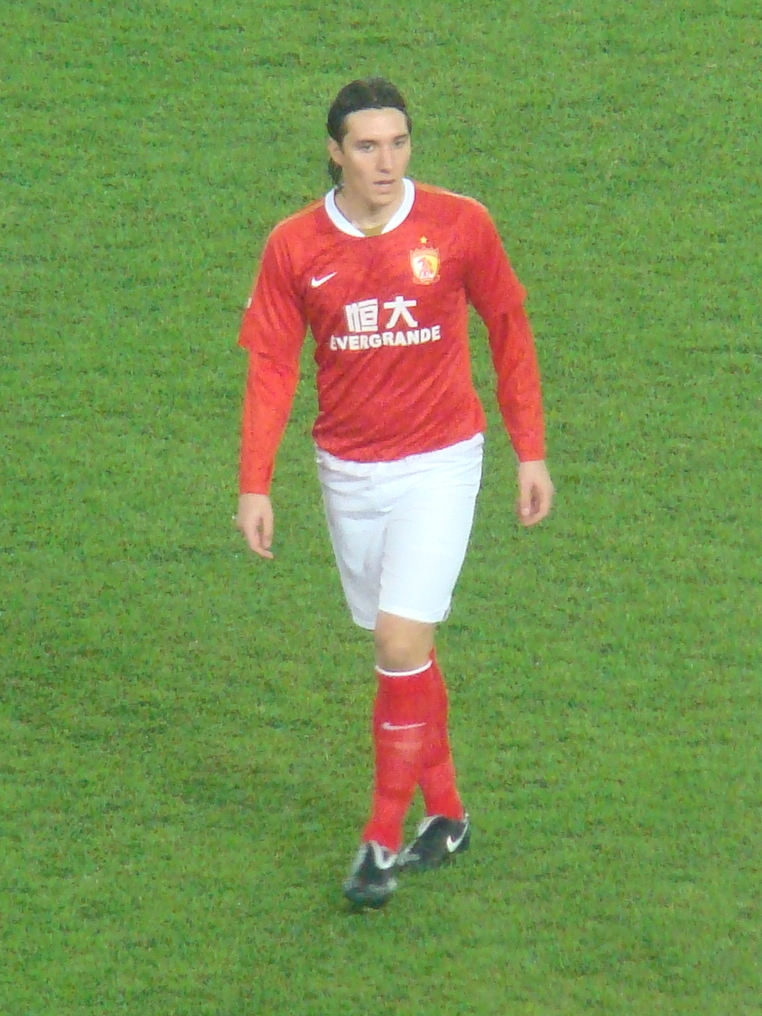
- Cléo with Guangzhou Evergrande in 2012

Personal information
- Full name: Cléverson Gabriel Córdova
- Date of birth: 9 August 1985 (age 41)
- Place of birth: Guarapuava, Brazil
- Height: 1.85 m (6 ft 1 in)
- Position: Forward

Youth career
- Batel
- Comercial-PR

Senior career*
Years	Team	Apps	(Gls)
2004–2005	Olivais e Moscavide	13	(7)
2005–2006	Atlético Paranaense	5	(1)
2005	→ Figueirense (loan)	2	(0)
2006–2009	Olivais e Moscavide	61	(19)
2008–2009	→ Red Star Belgrade (loan)	20	(8)
2009–2011	Partizan	41	(22)
2011–2014	Guangzhou Evergrande	38	(17)
2013	→ Kashiwa Reysol (loan)	27	(9)
2014–2015	Atlético Paranaense	28	(9)
2016	Goiás	8	(1)
2017–2018	Cova da Piedade	23	(11)
2018–2020	Qingdao Huanghai	44	(25)
- * Club domestic league appearances and goals

Cléverson Gabriel Córdova (born 9 August 1985), commonly known as Cléo, is a Brazilian former professional footballer who played as a forward. He also holds Serbian citizenship.

While playing on three different continents, Cléo scored at least once in the major club international competitions, in the Copa Libertadores for Atlético Paranaense, in the UEFA Champions League for Partizan, and in the AFC Champions League for two clubs, Guangzhou Evergrande and Kashiwa Reysol.

== Club career ==
=== Early career ===
Born in Guarapuava, Cléo started out with local club Batel, before joining Comercial-PR. He was later spotted by Olivais e Moscavide, which brought him to Portugal in the summer of 2004. Six months later, Cléo returned to Brazil and signed for Atlético Paranaense, playing with them in the 2005 and 2006 Campeonato Brasileiro Série A. He also made three appearances in the 2005 Copa Libertadores, scoring once against Paraguayan side Cerro Porteño. Meanwhile, Cléo spent some time on loan at Ferroviária and Figueirense in 2005. In the summer of 2006, Cléo returned to Olivais e Moscavide, staying there for the next two seasons.

In August 2008, Cléo moved to Serbian club Red Star Belgrade, on a one-year loan with a view to a permanent move. He was given the number 17 shirt. During a turbulent period for the club, Cléo managed to score 12 goals in 24 appearances (league and cup) that season. He eventually left Red Star after the club was not able to pay a transfer fee of €800,000.

=== Partizan ===
==== 2009–10 season ====
On 19 June 2009, Cléo signed a four-year contract with Partizan, becoming the first player to join the club from arch-rivals Red Star in more than 20 years (the last was Goran Milojević in 1988). He scored on his official debut for Partizan on 14 July and helped his team to a 4–0 away win over Welsh champions Rhyl in the first match of the 2009–10 UEFA Champions League second qualifying round. Seven days later, Cléo netted a hat-trick in the return leg, opening his tally in an 8–0 victory with a bicycle kick. He also scored from a penalty in a 1–1 home draw with Slovak side MŠK Žilina in the first leg of the 2009–10 UEFA Europa League play-off round. On 28 November, Cléo scored a goal against his former club to help Partizan beat Red Star 2–1. He appeared regularly in the second part of the 2009–10 Serbian SuperLiga, adding nine goals in 14 games, and helped Partizan clinch their third consecutive title. In total, Cléo was the club's top scorer with 22 goals in all competitions, one more than Senegalese striker Lamine Diarra, who left the club at the end of the season.

==== 2010–11 season ====
On 14 July 2010, Cléo opened the season by scoring the third goal in his team's 3–1 victory over Armenian champions Pyunik in the first leg of the 2010–11 UEFA Champions League second qualifying round. A week later in Yerevan in the second meeting, Cléo scored a goal from the edge of the penalty area in the fifth minute of injury time in the first half, thus leading his team to the next round with a total score of 4–1 on aggregate. In the first match of the third qualifying round, Cléo scored in the 90th minute for his team's 3–0 win against Finland's HJK. Subsequently, Cléo netted both goals in the team's 2–1 return leg victory. He also scored a goal in the first round of the 2010–11 Serbian SuperLiga against Inđija at home, thus continued his series of goals. On 18 August, in the play-off round first leg against Anderlecht, a game which ended 2–2, Cléo scored his seventh goal in six matches. Six days later, on 24 August, Cléo scored twice against Anderlecht in the return tie, bringing his tally to nine goals in seven matches in the season. He was also accurate in the penalty shoot-out, and so helped Partizan reach the Champions League for the first time in seven years. On 4 September, Cléo scored his 10th goal in the season with an overhead bicycle kick in the match against Hajduk Kula. On 28 September, in the second round of the Champions League group stage, Cléo completed one of two penalties in a 3–1 defeat versus Arsenal. On 8 December, again in a match against Arsenal, Cléo scored an equalizer at Emirates Stadium, however Partizan lost the game 3–1. He was voted as the club's Player of the Year in 2010 by the fans.

=== Guangzhou Evergrande ===
==== 2011 season ====
On 12 February 2011, Cléo completed his move to Chinese Super League side Guangzhou Evergrande, signing a four-year deal. At the time, this move set a new record of Chinese football with €3.2 million ($4.5 million) transfer fee. He made his league debut for Guangzhou against Dalian Shide on 2 April and scored the winning goal in the match. Cléo started the season by scoring five goals in his first five league appearances. However, Cléo suffered a muscular strain in leg during a FA Cup match against Guizhou Zhicheng on 4 May, ruling him out for two months. On 26 June, after recovering from injury, Cléo entered from the bench at the half and scored a penalty in the 60th minute against Jiangsu Sainty. He scored another four goals in the next four matches, but the recurrence of a leg strain in a match against Nanchang Hengyuan on 14 July ruled him out for a further two months. Cléo returned to training in late August but got injured again in early September. The lingering injury kept him out of the field for the second half of the year. He managed to score 10 times in 10 appearances during the 2011 league season.

==== 2012 season ====
After the end of the 2011 season, it was reported that Guangzhou had decided to give up Cléo for his lingering injury. He was linked with France's Ligue 1 side Marseille and another Super League club Guizhou Renhe. However, Cléo eventually stayed in Guangzhou for the 2012 season.

On 25 February 2012, Cléo scored both goals for Guangzhou in the 2012 Chinese FA Super Cup, a 2–1 victory over Tianjin Teda, which ensured Guangzhou win this trophy for the first time in the club's history. He continued his goalscoring form into the AFC Champions League, netting a brace in the first match of the group stage, as Guangzhou trashed K League champions Jeonbuk Hyundai Motors 5–1 on 7 March. On 15 May, during Guangzhou's last group stage match of the Champions League against Buriram United, Cléo earned a penalty in the 90th minute, which Darío Conca converted into the winning goal. Guangzhou beat Buriram United 2–1 and sealed a place in the knockout phase for the Chinese Super League side. On 30 May, Cléo scored the winning goal during the round of 16 in the AFC Champions League, as Guangzhou beat J1 League side FC Tokyo 1–0 and became the first Chinese club to reach the quarter-finals of the competition since 2006. Although scoring four goals in seven matches, Cléo was replaced by newcomer Lucas Barrios in the 30-man squad which was submitted for the next stage of the Champions League. On 18 August, in an interview after a league match against Changchun Yatai, in which Cléo scored a goal and made an assist to help Guangzhou to a 2–1 win, Cléo stated his disappointment with the club's decision to exclude him from the Champions League squad and would seek a transfer at the end of the season. Cléo played as a regular starter in the domestic competitions and helped Guangzhou Evergrande win their second Super League championship and first FA Cup title.

==== Loan to Kashiwa Reysol ====
On 25 January 2013, Cléo moved to Japanese club Kashiwa Reysol on a one-year loan deal. He made 27 appearances and scored nine goals in the 2013 J.League Division 1. In November, Cléo was diagnosed with appendicitis and his loan spell was cut short by the Japanese club. He then returned to Guangzhou Evergrande and was released in early 2014.

=== Return to Atlético Paranaense ===
After leaving Asia, Cléo returned to his homeland and started training with his former club Atlético Paranaense in May 2014. He signed a permanent contract shortly after. On 29 May, Cléo made his second debut for the club in a 2–2 home draw with São Paulo. He stepped on the pitch in the 77th minute and managed to score little more than 10 minutes later with a volley kick. Throughout the 2014 Brasileirão, Cléo appeared in 20 games and scored nine times, making him the team's highest scorer that year.

=== Later career ===
On 29 February 2016, Cléo signed a contract with Série B club Goiás, being officially presented two days later. He scored a hat-trick in his team's 5–3 success against Trindade, helping the side win the Campeonato Goiano the same year.

In August 2017, Cléo returned to Portugal and signed with newly promoted LigaPro club Cova da Piedade on a one-year deal. He was the team's top scorer in the 2017–18 season with 12 goals in all competitions.

In July 2018, Cléo signed with China League One club Qingdao Huanghai, returning to Chinese football after six years. He was the team's top scorer over the next two seasons, helping them win the 2019 China League One and get promotion to the Chinese Super League for the first time in history.

== International career ==
In August 2010, Cléo expressed his desire to play for the Serbia national team. He applied for Serbian citizenship the following month after meeting with Ivica Dačić, the Minister of Internal Affairs. On 23 September 2010, Cléo became a citizen of Serbia.

However, Cléo never received a call-up for the Serbia national team, failing to satisfy a 5-year residency requirement.

== Career statistics ==
As of 1 December 2020

Appearances and goals by club, season and competition
Club	Season	League			National cup		League cup		Continental		Other		Total	
Club	Season	Division	Apps	Goals	Apps	Goals	Apps	Goals	Apps	Goals	Apps	Goals	Apps	Goals
Olivais e Moscavide	2004–05	Segunda Divisão B	13	7	1	0	0	0	—		—		14	7
Atlético Paranaense	2005	Série A	5	1	0	0	—		3	1	0	0	8	2
Atlético Paranaense	2006	Série A	0	0	1	0	—		0	0	6 (Note: Appearances in Campeonato Paranaense)	0	7	0
Atlético Paranaense	Total		5	1	1	0	—		3	1	6	0	15	2
Figueirense (loan)	2005	Série A	2	0	0	0	—		—		0	0	2	0
Olivais e Moscavide	2006–07	Liga de Honra	26	3	2	1	0	0	—		—		28	4
Olivais e Moscavide	2007–08	Segunda Divisão	35	16	1	0	0	0	—		—		36	16
Olivais e Moscavide	Total		61	19	3	1	0	0	—		—		64	20
Red Star Belgrade (loan)	2008–09	Serbian SuperLiga	20	8	4	4	—		0	0	—		24	12
Partizan	2009–10	Serbian SuperLiga	27	14	4	2	—		9	6	—		40	22
Partizan	2010–11	Serbian SuperLiga	14	8	1	2	—		12	10	—		27	20
Partizan	Total		41	22	5	4	—		21	16	—		67	42
Guangzhou Evergrande	2011	Chinese Super League	10	10	1	0	—		—		—		11	10
Guangzhou Evergrande	2012	Chinese Super League	28	7	4	1	—		7	4	1 (Note: Appearance in Chinese FA Super Cup)	2	40	14
Guangzhou Evergrande	Total		38	17	5	1	—		7	4	1	2	51	24
Kashiwa Reysol (loan)	2013	J.League Division 1	27	9	2	3	5	0	11	2	1 (Note: Appearance in Japanese Super Cup)	0	46	14
Atlético Paranaense	2014	Série A	20	9	2	0	—		0	0	0	0	22	9
Atlético Paranaense	2015	Série A	8	0	0	0	—		1	0	6	2	15	2
Atlético Paranaense	Total		28	9	2	0	—		1	0	6	2	37	11
Goiás	2016	Série B	8	1	2	0	—		—		7 (Note: Appearances in Campeonato Goiano)	3	17	4
Cova da Piedade	2017–18	LigaPro	23	11	1	1	1	0	—		—		25	12
Qingdao Huanghai	2018	China League One	15	11	0	0	—		—		—		15	11
Qingdao Huanghai	2019	China League One	24	14	0	0	—		—		—		24	14
Qingdao Huanghai	2020	Chinese Super League	5	0	1	1	—		—		—		6	1
Qingdao Huanghai	Total		44	25	1	1	—		—		—		45	26
Career total			310	129	27	15	6	0	43	23	21	7	407	174

== Honours ==
Partizan

- Serbian SuperLiga: 2009–10

Guangzhou Evergrande

- Chinese Super League: 2011, 2012
- Chinese FA Cup: 2012
- Chinese FA Super Cup: 2012

Kashiwa Reysol

- J.League Cup: 2013

Goiás

- Campeonato Goiano: 2016

Qingdao Huanghai

- China League One: 2019

Individual

- Serbian Cup Top Scorer: 2008–09
- FK Partizan Player of the Year: 2010
- Chinese FA Super Cup Most Valuable Player: 2012
