= Sjoerd Ars =

Dutch footballer (born 1984)

Personal information
- Full name: Sjoerd Adrianus Theodorus Ars
- Date of birth: 15 April 1984 (age 42)
- Place of birth: Terborg, Netherlands
- Height: 1.83 m (6 ft 0 in)
- Position: Striker

Youth career
- DVC'26
- Feyenoord

Senior career*
Years	Team	Apps	(Gls)
2002–2005	De Graafschap	13	(2)
2005–2006	Omniworld	36	(17)
2006–2008	Go Ahead Eagles	74	(34)
2008–2010	RBC Roosendaal	74	(32)
2010–2011	Zwolle	33	(28)
2011–2013	Levski Sofia	14	(6)
2012	→ Tianjin Teda (loan)	29	(13)
2013	→ Konyaspor (loan)	17	(7)
2013–2014	Karşıyaka	35	(9)
2014–2015	NEC	37	(28)
2015–2016	NAC Breda	33	(21)
2016	Szombathelyi Haladás	14	(1)
2017–2018	Fortuna Sittard	11	(0)
2017–2018	→ De Graafschap	31	(8)
2018	De Treffers	16	(5)
Total		464	(211)
- * Club domestic league appearances and goals

Sjoerd Adrianus Theodorus Ars (Dutch pronunciation: [ɕuːrt ˈɑrs]; born 15 April 1984) is a Dutch former professional footballer who played as a striker.

== Career ==
=== Youth career ===
Ars played in the youth of DVC'26 from the town of Didam, and was later picked up by Dutch giants, Feyenoord. He never broke through to the first team, and chose to play professionally for De Graafschap.

=== Dutch second division ===
After one season in Doetinchem, he decided to sign with FC Omniworld, a club that became a licensed pro-club that year. In his first season in Almere, Ars scored 17 goals.

He later played four successful seasons for Go Ahead Eagles and RBC Roosendaal.

=== FC Zwolle ===
In 2010, Ars signed a contract at FC Zwolle. He started the season well by scoring 11 goals in his first 10 league matches. He finished the season with 28 goals, scored in 33 matches.

=== Levski Sofia ===
His great season with FC Zwolle was enough to be signed by Bulgarian side PFC Levski Sofia. Ars arrived in Sofia on 23 June 2011 and signed a three-year contract the next day. On 28 July 2011, in his official debut for Levski, he came on as a substitute and scored the winning goal for the 2–1 win over FC Spartak Trnava. Ars also netted a goal to open the scoring in the return leg, while Levski were eventually eliminated after losing the penalty shootout to decide the match (the aggregate score at the end of extra time was 3–3). On 6 November 2011, he scored a brace in the 3–2 home win over Loko Plovdiv in an A Group match.

=== Tianjin Teda ===
In February 2012, Ars went to Chinese Super League side Tianjin Teda on loan. Tianjin Teda also had an option to make the move permanent in the end of the 2012 league season. He made his official debut for Tianjin on 25 February, in a 2–1 CFA Super Cup defeat against Guangzhou Evergrande.

After spells in Turkey, Ars returned to the Netherlands to join NEC Nijmegen. He topped the Eerste Divisie top goalscorers charts at the end of the club's title winning 2014–15 season and moved on to NAC. In summer 2016, Ars left NAC Breda for Hungarian side Szombathelyi Haladás.

He played for De Treffers in the Dutch Tweede Divisie in the 2018–19 season before retiring in December 2018.

== Career statistics ==
Appearances and goals by club, season and competition
Club	Season	League			Cup		Continental		Other		Total	
Club	Season	Division	Apps	Goals	Apps	Goals	Apps	Goals	Apps	Goals	Apps	Goals
De Graafschap	2003–04	Eerste Divisie	13	2	0	0	—		—		13	2
De Graafschap	2004–05	Eerste Divisie	0	0	0	0	—		—		0	0
De Graafschap	Total		13	2	0	0	—		—		13	2
FC Omniworld	2005–06	Eerste Divisie	36	17	0	0	—		—		36	17
Go Ahead Eagles	2006–07	Eerste Divisie	38	18	0	0	—		2	2	40	20
Go Ahead Eagles	2007–08	Eerste Divisie	36	16	2	0	—		2	0	40	16
Go Ahead Eagles	Total		74	34	2	0	—		4	2	80	36
RBC Roosendaal	2008–09	Eerste Divisie	37	17	1	0	—		—		38	17
RBC Roosendaal	2009–10	Eerste Divisie	37	15	2	4	—		—		39	19
RBC Roosendaal	Total		74	32	3	4	—		—		77	36
FC Zwolle	2010–11	Eerste Divisie	33	28	2	1	—		4	1	39	30
Levski Sofia	2011–12	A PFG	14	6	0	0	2	2	—		16	8
Tianjin Teda (loan)	2012	Chinese Super League	29	13	0	0	6	0	—		35	13
Konyaspor (loan)	2012–13	TFF First League	14	7	0	0	—		3	1	17	8
Karşıyaka	2013–14	TFF First League	35	9	0	0	—		—		35	9
NEC	2014–15	Eerste Divisie	35	28	3	3	—		—		38	31
NEC	2015–16	Eredivisie	2	0	0	0	—		—		2	0
NEC	Total		37	28	3	3	—		—		40	31
NAC Breda	2015–16	Eerste Divisie	33	21	0	0	—		4	1	37	22
Szombathelyi Haladás	2016–17	Nemzeti Bajnokság I	14	1	0	0	—		—		14	1
Fortuna Sittard	2016–17	Eerste Divisie	11	0	0	0	—		—		11	0
De Graafschap (loan)	2017–18	Eerste Divisie	31	8	1	1	—		—		32	9
De Treffers	2018–19	Tweede Divisie	16	5	1	1	—		—		17	6
Career total			464	211	12	10	8	2	15	5	499	228

== Honours ==
NEC

- Eerste Divisie: 2014–15
