= Veliče Šumulikoski =

Macedonian footballer

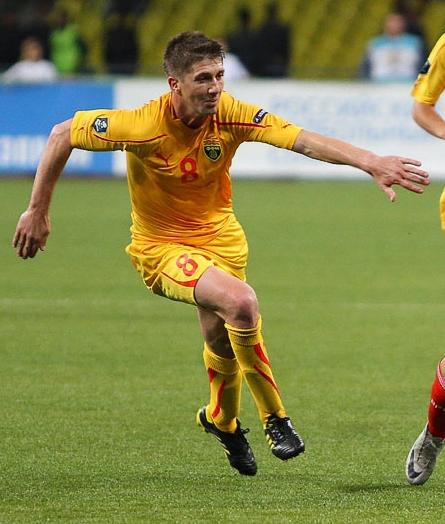
- Šumulikoski with Macedonia in 2011

Personal information
- Date of birth: 24 April 1981 (age 45)
- Place of birth: Struga, SR Macedonia, Yugoslavia
- Height: 1.83 m (6 ft 0 in)
- Position: Central midfielder

Team information
- Current team: 1. FC Slovácko (director of football)

Senior career*
Years	Team	Apps	(Gls)
1999–2001	Publikum Celje	56	(4)
2002–2003	Synot	55	(2)
2004–2006	Zenit Saint Petersburg	46	(1)
2006–2007	Bursaspor	30	(1)
2008–2009	Ipswich Town	42	(1)
2009–2010	Preston North End	15	(0)
2010–2012	Sibir Novosibirsk	43	(2)
2012	Tianjin Teda	28	(0)
2013–2018	Slovácko	114	(6)
Total		436	(17)

International career
	Macedonia U21	9	(0)
2000–2013	Macedonia	84	(1)

Managerial career
- 2018–: Slovácko (director of football)
- * Club domestic league appearances and goals

Veliče Šumulikoski (Macedonian: Величе Шумуликоски; born 24 April 1981) is a Macedonian former football midfielder. He is the third most capped player of all time of the North Macedonia national football team. He is the director of football for Czech club Slovácko.

== Club career ==
On 29 January 2008, Šumulikoski signed for Ipswich Town from Turkish club Bursaspor for a fee believed to be in the region of £650,000, potentially rising to over £1 million depending on appearances. Šumulikoski received his work permit on the following day but only received international clearance on 2 February 2008 after a delay by the Turkish FA. He made his debut later that day coming off the bench in Ipswich's 2–1 away win against Sheffield Wednesday. On 16 February 2008, he scored his first goal for Ipswich in his first home start for the club, his fourth appearance overall, in a 2–1 win over Blackpool F.C.

On 4 August 2009, he signed for Preston North End on a three-year deal for fee in the region of £400,000 by manager Alan Irvine. Šumulikoski only made 15 appearances for Preston, including nine starts, and failed to appear after Irvine was fired in December 2009 and replaced by Darren Ferguson. Preston agreed a settlement to release Šumulikoski from the remainder of his contract in May 2010. After his release, he briefly trained with newly promoted Championship side, Leeds United.

Crystal Palace manager George Burley decided not to permanently sign Šumulikoski after he played in two trial matches. In August 2010, he signed for Russian side Sibir Novosibirsk. He was voted to become captain of Sibir by his teammates prior to the start of the 2011 season.

In February 2012, Šumulikoski signed for Chinese club Tianjin Teda F.C. He made his official debut for Tianjin on 25 February, in a 2–1 CFA Super Cup defeat against Guangzhou Evergrande. Tianjin Teda agreed a settlement to release Šumulikoski from the remainder of his contract in January 2013. Šumulikoski back in the Czech Republic to sign for 1. FC Slovácko.

== International career ==
He made his senior debut for Macedonia in a July 2000 friendly match against Azerbaijan and has earned a total of 84 caps, scoring 1 goal. His final international was a June 2013 friendly against Norway.

Sporting positions
Preceded by Goce Sedloski	Macedonia captain 2009–2012	Succeeded by Goran Pandev
