= Nie Tao =

Chinese footballer

Nie Tao 聂涛
Personal information
- Date of birth: 18 January 1987 (age 39)
- Place of birth: Tianjin, China
- Height: 1.80 m (5 ft 11 in)
- Position: Full-back

Team information
- Current team: Tianjin Kunshengxing

Youth career
- 1998–2005: Tianjin Bohai
- 2006–2008: Tianjin Teda

Senior career*
Years	Team	Apps	(Gls)
2009–2017	Tianjin Teda	82	(1)
2018–2019	Beijing Enterprises	43	(0)
2021-2022	Tianjin Jinmen Tiger	1	(0)
2022-	Tianjin Kunshengxing	0	(0)
- * Club domestic league appearances and goals as of 6 April 2022

Nie Tao (simplified Chinese: 聂涛; traditional Chinese: 聶濤; pinyin: Niè Tāo; born 18 January 1987 in Tianjin, China) is a Chinese professional footballer who currently plays for Chinese club Tianjin Kunshengxing as a full-back.

== Club career ==
Nie started his professional career with Chinese Super League side Tianjin Teda in 2009. On 19 May 2009, he made his senior debut in the last round of 2009 AFC Champions League group stage match which Tianjin Teda beat Central Coast Mariners 1–0, coming on as a substitute for Han Yanming in the 82nd minutes.

On 28 February 2018, Nie transferred to China League One side Beijing Enterprises.

== Career statistics ==
Statistics accurate as of match played 31 December 2020.

Appearances and goals by club, season and competition
Club	Season	League			National Cup		Continental		Other		Total	
Club	Season	Division	Apps	Goals	Apps	Goals	Apps	Goals	Apps	Goals	Apps	Goals
Tianjin Teda	2009	Chinese Super League	0	0	-		1	0	-		1	0
Tianjin Teda	2010	Chinese Super League	6	0	-		-		-		6	0
Tianjin Teda	2011	Chinese Super League	11	0	2	0	1	0	-		14	0
Tianjin Teda	2012	Chinese Super League	14	0	0	0	4	0	-		18	0
Tianjin Teda	2013	Chinese Super League	0	0	2	0	-		-		2	0
Tianjin Teda	2014	Chinese Super League	15	0	1	0	-		-		16	0
Tianjin Teda	2015	Chinese Super League	12	1	2	1	-		-		14	2
Tianjin Teda	2016	Chinese Super League	20	0	1	0	-		-		21	0
Tianjin Teda	2017	Chinese Super League	4	0	2	0	-		-		6	0
Tianjin Teda	Total		82	1	10	1	6	0	0	0	98	2
Beijing Enterprises	2018	China League One	22	0	0	0	-		-		22	0
Beijing Enterprises	2019	China League One	21	0	0	0	-		-		21	0
Beijing Enterprises	Total		43	0	0	0	0	0	0	0	43	0
Career total			125	1	10	1	6	0	0	0	141	2

== Honours ==
=== Club ===
Tianjin Teda

- Chinese FA Cup: 2011
