= Liao Bochao =

Chinese footballer

Liao Bochao 聊博超
Personal information
- Date of birth: 16 July 1987 (age 39)
- Place of birth: Tianjin, China
- Height: 1.80 m (5 ft 11 in)
- Position: Full-back

Youth career
- Tianjin Teda

Senior career*
Years	Team	Apps	(Gls)
2008–2019	Tianjin Teda	120	(2)
- * Club domestic league appearances and goals as of 31 December 2019

Liao Bochao (Chinese: 聊博超; pinyin: Liáo Bóchāo; born 16 July 1987) is a Chinese former professional footballer who plays as a full-back.

== Club career ==
Liao started his professional career with Chinese Super League side Tianjin Teda in 2008. On 6 July 2008, he made his senior debut in a league match which Tianjin Teda beat Liaoning Whowin, coming on as a substitute for Bai Yi. He scored his first goal in this match.

== Career statistics ==
Statistics accurate as of match played 31 December 2019.

Appearances and goals by club, season and competition
Club	Season	League			National Cup		Continental		Other		Total	
Club	Season	Division	Apps	Goals	Apps	Goals	Apps	Goals	Apps	Goals	Apps	Goals
Tianjin Teda	2008	Chinese Super League	2	1	-		-		-		2	1
Tianjin Teda	2009	Chinese Super League	10	0	-		2	0	-		12	0
Tianjin Teda	2010	Chinese Super League	19	1	-		-		-		19	1
Tianjin Teda	2011	Chinese Super League	16	0	1	0	5	0	-		22	0
Tianjin Teda	2012	Chinese Super League	16	0	1	0	4	1	0 (Note: Appearances in Chinese FA Super Cup)	0	21	1
Tianjin Teda	2013	Chinese Super League	23	0	0	0	-		-		23	0
Tianjin Teda	2014	Chinese Super League	14	0	0	0	-		-		14	0
Tianjin Teda	2015	Chinese Super League	12	0	2	0	-		-		14	0
Tianjin Teda	2016	Chinese Super League	2	0	2	0	-		-		4	0
Tianjin Teda	2017	Chinese Super League	2	0	1	0	-		-		3	0
Tianjin Teda	2018	Chinese Super League	4	0	1	0	-		-		5	0
Tianjin Teda	Total		120	2	8	0	11	1	0	0	139	3
Career total			120	2	8	0	11	1	0	0	139	3

== Honours ==
=== Club ===
Tianjin Teda

- Chinese FA Cup: 2011
