= Yang Jing (disambiguation) =

Yang Jing (born 1953) is a former Chinese politician.

Yang Jing or Jing Yang may also refer to:

- Yang Jing (composer), Chinese composer
- Jing Yang (computer engineer), Chinese-American professor
- Yang Jing (violinist) (born 1983), Chinese violinist
- Yang Jing (fictional character), or Yang Yanzhao, The Generals of the Yang Family character
