= Milan Susak =

Australian soccer player and trainer

- Susak in 2013

Personal information
- Full name: Milan Susak
- Date of birth: 29 January 1984 (age 42)
- Place of birth: Fairfield, Australia
- Height: 1.81 m (5 ft 11 in)
- Position: Defender

Youth career
- 1996–1998: Bonnyrigg White Eagles
- 1998–2001: Sydney Olympic

Senior career*
Years	Team	Apps	(Gls)
2001–2002	Sydney Olympic	0	(0)
2002–2007	Vojvodina	22	(0)
2003–2004	→ Veternik (loan)	20	(3)
2006–2007	→ ČSK Čelarevo (loan)	9	(0)
2007–2008	Adelaide United	12	(0)
2008–2010	SpVgg Unterhaching	55	(1)
2010–2011	Brisbane Roar	29	(0)
2011	→ Minangkabau (loan)	12	(0)
2011–2012	Adelaide United	9	(0)
2012–2013	Tianjin Teda	16	(1)
2013	Sepahan	11	(0)
2013–2014	Al Wasl	8	(0)
2015	East Bengal	12	(0)
2015	Yangon United		
- * Club domestic league appearances and goals as of 17:09, 31 March 2015 (UTC)

Milan Susak (Serbian: Milan Šušak, known to the boys as Milzy, (born 29 January 1984) is an Australian retired footballer who last played for Yangon United as a defender. He is currently a trainer at the youth soccer team of Western Sydney.

== Club career ==
=== Early years ===
Susak is also of Serbian descent. He penned a one-year deal on 26 July 2007 after impressing coach Aurelio Vidmar in pre-season games against Melbourne and Perth.

Susak's previous club was FK Vojvodina in the Meridian Superliga in Serbia and Montenegro, for whom he made 22 appearances having also played on loan in two lower league clubs, FK Veternik and FK ČSK Čelarevo.

In April 2008, he was able to go out on a high by playing the full 90 minutes of Adelaide's successful Asian Champions League campaign while not conceding a goal to allow the Reds to advance to the quarter-finals of the competition.

On 5 June 2008, Susak signed a one-year contract with the German club SpVgg Unterhaching with the option of another year after being recommended for a trial by fellow Australian Paul Agostino.

After two years at Unterhaching he returned home and signed for Brisbane Roar in the A-League In the same year he won the Premiership and Championship going undefeated in 26 matches.

In 2011, he stated on his Twitter account that he signed a loan deal with Liga Primer Indonesia outfit Minangkabau FC.

On 27 September 2011, he signed a two-year contract with his old club Adelaide United returning to Australia after a short stint in Indonesia.

In October 2011, Holger Osieck selected Susak for the upcoming national team training camp.

=== Later years ===
In February 2012, it was announced that Chinese Super League club Tianjin Teda had signed Susak for $200,000. He made his official debut for Tianjin on 25 February, in a 2–1 CFA Super Cup defeat against Guangzhou Evergrande. On 5 December 2012, he signed a contract with Iranian champions Sepahan.

Susak is the only Australian footballer who has played in three Asian Champions League campaign's with three clubs in different countries.

In June 2013 it was announced that UAE Pro League club Al Wasl had signed Susak from Sepahan for an estimated $500,000 transfer fee.

=== East Bengal ===
In November 2014, Susak signed for I-League giant East Bengal for one year. He said that he wanted to win trophies for the club besides the opportunity to play in the AFC Cup attracted him to join the Kolkatan outfit.

=== Yangon United ===
On 10 December 2015, he transferred to Yangon United FC.

== Club statistics ==
As of 20 April 2015

Club	Season	League			Cup		Continental		Total	
Club	Season	Division	Apps	Goals	Apps	Goals	Apps	Goals	Apps	Goals
Adelaide United	2007–08	A-League	12	0	0	0	2	0	14	0
SpVgg Unterhaching	2008–09	3. Liga	34	1	1	0	—		35	1
SpVgg Unterhaching	2009–10	3. Liga	21	0	0	0	—		21	0
SpVgg Unterhaching	Total		55	1	1	0	—		56	1
Brisbane Roar	2010–11	A-League	29	0	0	0	—		29	0
Adelaide United	2011–12	A-League	9	0	0	0	—		9	0
Tianjin Teda	2012	CSL	16	1	0	0	5	0	21	1
Sepahan	2012–13	Iran Pro League	11	0	0	0	4	0	15	0
Al Wasl	2013–14	UAE Arabian Gulf League	8	0	5	0	—		13	0
East Bengal	2014–15	I-League	12	0			4	0	16	0
Career total			152	1	6	0	15	0	173	11

== Honours ==
Brisbane Roar

- A-League Premiership: 2010–11
- A-League Championship: 2010–11

Sepahan

- Hazfi Cup Winner: 2012–13
