= Zhou Liao =

Chinese footballer

Zhou Liao 周燎
Personal information
- Date of birth: 2 February 1989 (age 37)
- Place of birth: Wuhan, Hubei, China
- Height: 1.80 m (5 ft 11 in)
- Position: Forward

Youth career
- Wuhan Optics Valley
- 2006: → Bolton Wanderers (loan)

Senior career*
Years	Team	Apps	(Gls)
2007–2008	Wuhan Optics Valley	22	(1)
2009–2011	Hubei Greenery	47	(11)
2012–2019	Tianjin Teda	34	(0)
2016	→ Wuhan Zall (loan)	18	(1)
2017	→ Yinchuan Helanshan (loan)	17	(7)
2019	→ Yinchuan Helanshan (loan)	9	(4)
2020–2021	Wuhan Three Towns	11	(0)

International career
2007–2008	China U20		
- * Club domestic league appearances and goals as of 31 January 2023

Zhou Liao (Chinese: 周燎; pinyin: Zhōu Liáo; born 2 February 1989) is a Chinese former footballer who played as a striker.

== Club career ==
Zhou was deemed as a high potential player when he was in Wuhan youth team system. In 2006, he was invited to a one-month trial at Premier League side Bolton Wanderers with his teammate Yang Changpeng. Zhou started his professional career with Wuhan Optics Valley in 2007. On 17 April, he made his senior debut and scored the winning goal in a Chinese Super League match which Wuhan beat Shandong Luneng Taishan 3–2. In October 2008, Wuhan Optics Valley withdrew from the top tier for what it claimed was unfair punishment by the Chinese Football Association. He joined Hubei Greenery which used the Wuhan U-19 team as well as Hubei youth team as the foundation for the squad in 2009 and made an impression within the team as Hubei Greenery won promotion to China League One in 2009 season. Zhou refused to extend his contract in 2011 when Hubei Greenery was purchased and renamed as Hubei Wuhan Zhongbo. He was linked with Super League club Shandong Luneng, Tianjin Teda and Henan Jianye in the summer of 2011. However, Zhou eventually decided to stay in Hubei and extend his contract for half year.

Zhou made a free transfer to Tianjin Teda in November 2011. On 20 March 2012, he made his debut for Tianjin Teda in a 2012 AFC Champions League group stage match which Tianjin draw with K League side Seongnam Ilhwa Chunma 1–1. On 25 February 2016, Zhou was loaned to China League One club Wuhan Zall until 31 December 2016.

On 23 June 2017, Zhou moved to China League Two side Yinchuan Helanshan on a half season loan deal.

On 8 August 2020, he signed with Wuhan Three Towns. In his first season with the club he would go on to aid them in winning the division title and promotion into the second tier. This would be followed by another division title win and promotion as the club entered the top tier for the first tine in their history.

On 29 January 2026, Zhou was given a lifetime ban for match-fixing by the Chinese Football Association.

== Career statistics ==
Statistics accurate as of match played 31 January 2023.

Appearances and goals by club, season and competition
Club	Season	League			National Cup		Continental		Other		Total	
Club	Season	Division	Apps	Goals	Apps	Goals	Apps	Goals	Apps	Goals	Apps	Goals
Wuhan Optics Valley	2007	Chinese Super League	9	1	-		-		-		9	1
Wuhan Optics Valley	2008	Chinese Super League	13	0	-		-		-		13	0
Wuhan Optics Valley	Total		22	1	0	0	0	0	0	0	22	1
Hubei Greenery	2009	China League Two	12	4	-		-		-		12	4
Hubei Greenery	2010	China League One	23	4	-		-		-		23	4
Hubei Greenery	2011	China League One	12	3	1	0	-		-		13	3
Hubei Greenery	Total		47	11	1	0	0	0	0	0	48	11
Tianjin TEDA	2012	Chinese Super League	9	0	0	0	4	0	0 (Note: Appearances in Chinese FA Super Cup)	0	13	0
Tianjin TEDA	2013	Chinese Super League	9	0	1	0	-		-		10	0
Tianjin TEDA	2014	Chinese Super League	1	0	1	0	-		-		2	0
Tianjin TEDA	2015	Chinese Super League	8	0	2	2	-		-		10	2
Tianjin TEDA	2017	Chinese Super League	0	0	0	0	-		-		0	0
Tianjin TEDA	2018	Chinese Super League	7	0	1	0	-		-		8	0
Tianjin TEDA	Total		34	0	5	2	4	0	0	0	43	2
Wuhan Zall (loan)	2016	China League One	18	1	1	0	-		-		19	1
Yinchuan Helanshan (loan)	2017	China League Two	17	7	0	0	-		-		17	7
Yinchuan Helanshan (loan)	2019	China League Two	9	4	0	0	-		-		9	4
Wuhan Three Towns	2020	China League Two	9	0	-		-		-		9	0
Wuhan Three Towns	2021	China League One	2	0	0	0	-		-		2	0
Wuhan Three Towns	Total		11	0	0	0	0	0	0	0	11	0
Career total			158	24	7	2	4	0	0	0	169	26

== Honours ==
=== Club ===
Wuhan Three Towns

- China League One: 2021
- China League Two: 2020
