= Feng Junyan =

Chinese footballer (born 1984)

Feng Junyan 冯俊彦
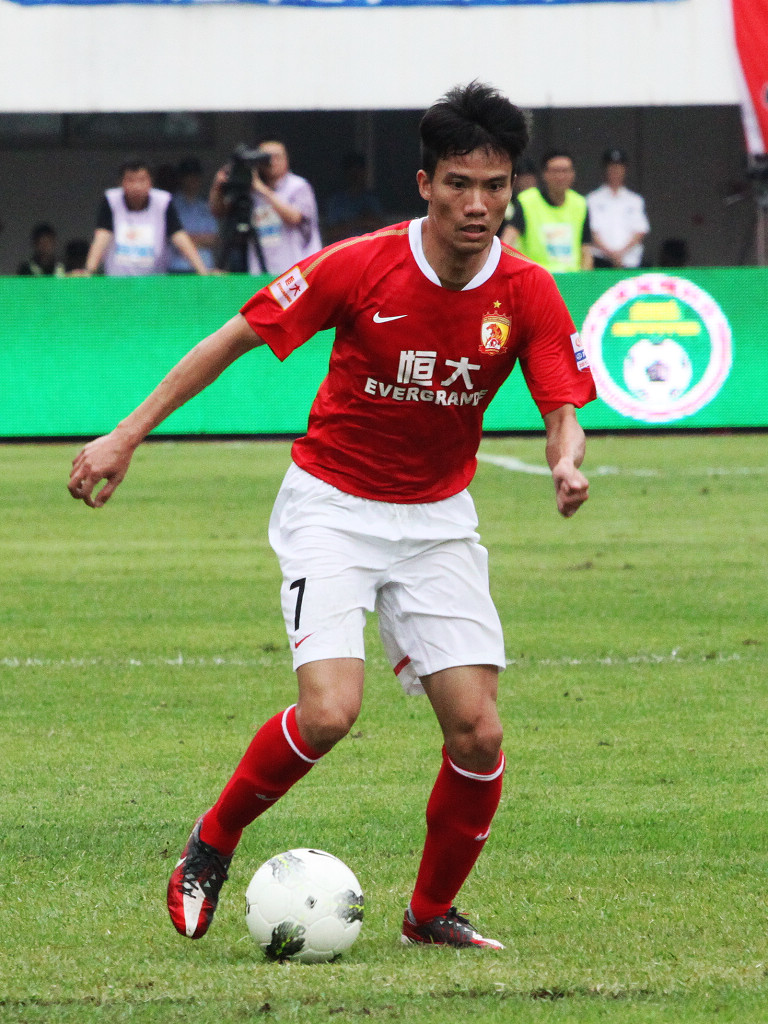

Personal information
- Full name: Feng Junyan
- Date of birth: 18 February 1984 (age 42)
- Place of birth: Guangzhou, Guangdong, China
- Height: 1.81 m (5 ft 11 in)
- Position: Midfielder

Youth career
- Guangzhou FC

Senior career*
Years	Team	Apps	(Gls)
2002–2003	Xiangxue Pharmaceutical		
2003–2014	Guangzhou Evergrande	222	(20)
Total		222	(20)
- * Club domestic league appearances and goals as of 26 May 2014

Feng Junyan (simplified Chinese: 冯俊彦; traditional Chinese: 馮俊彥; pinyin: Féng Jùnyàn; born 18 February 1984) is a former Chinese footballer who predominantly played for Guangzhou Evergrande in the Chinese Super League.

== Club career ==
Feng Junyan started his football career playing for Guangzhou F.C.'s youth academy before being promoted to the club's satellite team Xiangxue Pharmaceutical who were allowed to play during the 2002-03 season in the Hong Kong First Division League. Upon his return, the club's manager Mai Chao was impressed by him and on 5 July 2003 Feng was given his league debut against Xiamen Hongshi in a 1-0 defeat. As the season progressed, Feng would start to establish himself as the team's first-choice right winger and on 1 November 2003, he scored his first goal in a 6-1 win against Harbin Lange. The following seasons would see Feng further establish himself within the team until Shen Xiangfu came in as manager in 2007 and preferred Yang Pengfeng on the right wing after Feng lost his place due to injury. He would watch as Guangzhou went on to win the division title and promotion to the Chinese Super League; however, in the following season Shen converted him into a defensive midfielder and Feng enjoyed a productive season that saw Guangzhou quickly adapt to league and finish in a respectable seventh at the end of the 2008 season.

At the end of the 2009 season, Feng would go on to establish himself as the club's most capped player when he made 160 league appearances. Unfortunately for Feng, he was not allowed to continue his consistent form within the top tier when it was discovered that the club's general manager Yang Xu had fixed a league game on 19 August 2006 against Shanxi Wosen Luhu and the club were subsequently punished with relegation for their knowledge of his crimes. Despite this, Feng decided to stay loyal towards the club and played a vital part in the club's revival by immediately winning the second division title at the end of the 2010 season. With the club gaining new owners after the match-fixing scandal, they decided to pump significant investment into the squad and brought in established internationals in Gao Lin, Yang Hao, and Cho Won-hee which saw Feng earn limited playing time as the club went on to win its first top tier league title in 2011 season. On 18 February 2015, Feng announced that he had decided to retire from football.

== Career statistics ==
Club performance			League		Cup		League Cup		Continental		Others^{1}		Total	
Season	Club	League	Apps	Goals	Apps	Goals	Apps	Goals	Apps	Goals	Apps	Goals	Apps	Goals
China PR			League		FA Cup		CSL Cup		Asia		Others		Total	
2003	Guangzhou Evergrande	Chinese Jia-B League	21	1	0	0	-		-		-		21	1
2004	Guangzhou Evergrande	China League One	30	4	0	0	-		-		-		30	4
2005	Guangzhou Evergrande	China League One	23	4	1	0	-		-		-		24	4
2006	Guangzhou Evergrande	China League One	21	0	1	0	-		-		-		22	0
2007	Guangzhou Evergrande	China League One	13	1	-		-		-		-		13	1
2008	Guangzhou Evergrande	Chinese Super League	25	3	-		-		-		-		25	3
2009	Guangzhou Evergrande	Chinese Super League	27	1	-		-		-		-		27	1
2010	Guangzhou Evergrande	China League One	21	3	-		-		-		-		21	3
2011	Guangzhou Evergrande	Chinese Super League	6	0	0	0	-		-		-		6	0
2012	Guangzhou Evergrande	Chinese Super League	14	1	6	0	-		7	0	0	0	27	1
2013	Guangzhou Evergrande	Chinese Super League	16	1	5	2	-		3	0	2	0	26	3
2014	Guangzhou Evergrande	Chinese Super League	5	1	2	0	-		2	0	1	0	10	1
Total			222	20	15	2	0	0	12	0	3	0	252	22

^{1}Other tournaments include Chinese FA Super Cup and FIFA Club World Cup.

== Honours ==
=== Club ===
Guangzhou Evergrande

- Chinese Super League: 2011, 2012, 2013, 2014
- China League One: 2007, 2010
- Chinese FA Cup: 2012
- Chinese FA Super Cup: 2012
- AFC Champions League: 2013
