= Lu Yang (footballer) =

Chinese footballer

Lu Yang 芦洋
Personal information
- Full name: Lu Yang
- Date of birth: 3 March 1991 (age 35)
- Place of birth: Tianjin, China
- Height: 1.85 m (6 ft 1 in)
- Position: Midfielder

Team information
- Current team: Chengdu Better City
- Number: 22

Senior career*
Years	Team	Apps	(Gls)
2011	Tianjin Teda	0	(0)
2012–2018	Hebei China Fortune	61	(1)
2019–	Chengdu Better City	43	(3)
- * Club domestic league appearances and goals as of 31 December 2021

Lu Yang (Chinese: 芦洋; born 3 March 1991) is a Chinese footballer who currently plays for Chengdu Better City.

== Club career ==
Lu Yang started his professional football career in 2011 when he joined Tianjin Teda for the 2011 Chinese Super League campaign. In March 2012, he transferred to China League Two side Hebei Zhongji. On 29 July 2017, he made his debut for Hebei in the 2017 Chinese Super League against Shanghai Shenhua, coming on as a substitute for Luo Senwen in the 46th minute. He was sent to the Hebei China Fortune reserved team in 2018.

On 27 February 2019, Lu transferred to League Two newcomer Chengdu Better City. He would go on to win promotion with the club as they came runners-up at the end of the 2019 China League Two season. He would be part of the team as the club gained promotion to the top tier at the end of the 2021 league campaign.

== Career statistics ==
Statistics accurate as of match played 31 December 2021.

Appearances and goals by club, season and competition
Club	Season	League			National Cup		Continental		Other		Total	
Club	Season	Division	Apps	Goals	Apps	Goals	Apps	Goals	Apps	Goals	Apps	Goals
Tianjin Teda	2011	Chinese Super League	0	0	0	0	-		-		0	0
Hebei China Fortune	2012	China League Two	7	1	0	0	-		-		7	1
Hebei China Fortune	2013	China League Two	1	0	1	0	-		-		2	0
Hebei China Fortune	2014	China League One	25	0	0	0	-		-		25	0
Hebei China Fortune	2015	China League One	27	0	0	0	-		-		27	0
Hebei China Fortune	2016	Chinese Super League	0	0	3	0	-		-		3	0
Hebei China Fortune	2017	Chinese Super League	1	0	0	0	-		-		1	0
Hebei China Fortune	Total		61	1	4	0	0	0	0	0	65	1
Chengdu Better City	2019	China League Two	30	2	2	0	-		-		32	2
Chengdu Better City	2020	China League One	12	1	0	0	-		-		12	1
Chengdu Better City	2021	China League One	1	0	2	0	-		0 (Note: Appearance(s) in CSL Relegation play-offs)	0	3	0
Chengdu Better City	Total		43	3	4	0	0	0	0	0	47	3
Career total			104	4	8	0	0	0	0	0	112	4
