= Yang Qipeng =

Chinese footballer

Yang Qipeng 杨启鹏
Personal information
- Date of birth: 14 May 1987 (age 39)
- Place of birth: Tianjin, China
- Height: 1.88 m (6 ft 2 in)
- Position: Goalkeeper

Youth career
- Tianjin Teda

Senior career*
Years	Team	Apps	(Gls)
2004–2020	Tianjin Teda	106	(0)

International career
2017	China		

Managerial career
- 2024: Tianjin Jinmen Tiger U21 (goalkeeping)
- 2026: Foshan Nanshi (goalkeeping)
- * Club domestic league appearances and goals as of 31 December 2022

Yang Qipeng (Chinese: 杨启鹏; pinyin: Yáng Qǐpéng; Mandarin pronunciation: [jǎŋ.tɕʰì pʰə̌ŋ]; born 14 May 1987) is a Chinese football coach and former footballer who played as a goalkeeper.

== Club career ==
Yang started his professional career with Chinese Super League side Tianjin Teda in 2004. He became the first choice goalkeeper of the club in 2011. On 1 March, he made his senior debut in the first round of 2011 AFC Champions League group stage which Tianjin Teda beat K League side Jeju United 1–0 at Jeju World Cup Stadium. His performance in the AFC Champions League was described as "world-class" by media. However, he lost his position to Song Zhenyu who newly transferred from Chengdu Blades in July 2011. He won back his position in July 2012 after Costa Rican manager Alexandre Guimarães took charge of the club. He has been called up to the national team for the first time in 2017, during the preparation of the 2017 China Cup, but withdrew due to injury.

== Career statistics ==
Statistics accurate as of match played 31 December 2022.

Appearances and goals by club, season and competition
Club	Season	League			National Cup		League Cup		Continental		Total	
Club	Season	Division	Apps	Goals	Apps	Goals	Apps	Goals	Apps	Goals	Apps	Goals
Tianjin Teda	2004	Chinese Super League	0	0	0	0	0	0	-		0	0
Tianjin Teda	2005	Chinese Super League	0	0	0	0	0	0	-		0	0
Tianjin Teda	2006	Chinese Super League	0	0	0	0	-		-		0	0
Tianjin Teda	2007	Chinese Super League	0	0	-		-		-		0	0
Tianjin Teda	2008	Chinese Super League	0	0	-		-		-		0	0
Tianjin Teda	2009	Chinese Super League	0	0	-		-		0	0	0	0
Tianjin Teda	2010	Chinese Super League	0	0	-		-		-		0	0
Tianjin Teda	2011	Chinese Super League	10	0	0	0	-		5	0	15	0
Tianjin Teda	2012	Chinese Super League	15	0	0	0	-		2	0	17	0
Tianjin Teda	2013	Chinese Super League	22	0	0	0	-		-		22	0
Tianjin Teda	2014	Chinese Super League	3	0	0	0	-		-		3	0
Tianjin Teda	2015	Chinese Super League	9	0	0	0	-		-		9	0
Tianjin Teda	2016	Chinese Super League	30	0	0	0	-		-		30	0
Tianjin Teda	2017	Chinese Super League	11	0	1	0	-		-		12	0
Tianjin Teda	2018	Chinese Super League	4	0	2	0	-		-		6	0
Tianjin Teda	2019	Chinese Super League	2	0	1	0	-		-		3	0
Tianjin Teda	2020	Chinese Super League	0	0	1	0	-		-		1	0
Tianjin Teda	Total		106	0	5	0	0	0	7	0	118	0
Career total			106	0	5	0	0	0	7	0	118	0

== Honours ==
=== Club ===
Tianjin Teda

- Chinese FA Cup: 2011
