= Li Hongyang (footballer) =

Chinese footballer

Li Hongyang 李洪洋
Personal information
- Date of birth: 1 April 1984 (age 42)
- Place of birth: Tianjin, China
- Height: 1.85 m (6 ft 1 in)
- Position: Defender

Youth career
- 1999: Guangzhou Baiyunshan
- 2000–2001: Xiamen Hongshi

Senior career*
| Years | Team | Apps | (Gls) |
| 2002–2005 | Xiamen Lanshi | | |
| 2006–2008 | Shenzhen Shangqingyin | 49 | (2) |
| 2009 | Tianjin Teda | 0 | (0) |
| 2009–2011 | Chengdu Blades | 34 | (2) |
| 2012–2015 | Tianjin Teda | 6 | (0) |

Managerial career
- 2021-2022: Quanzhou Yassin (assistant coach)
- * Club domestic league appearances and goals as of 1 November 2015

Li Hongyang (Chinese: 李洪洋; pinyin: Lǐ Hóngyáng; born 1 April 1984, in Tianjin) is a Chinese former professional footballer.

== Club career ==
Li started his professional career with Xiamen Lanshi in 2002. He transferred to Shenzhen Kingway in 2006. Li moved back to hometown club Tianjin Teda in February 2009. However, he failed to establish himself within the team and transferred to Chengdu Blades in July 2009. He returned to Tianjin Teda in January 2012. On 1 May 2012, he made his debut for Tianjin in the fifth round of 2012 AFC Champions League group stage which Tianjin Teda lost to Central Coast Mariners 5–1 at Central Coast Stadium.

== Honours ==
Xiamen Lanshi

- China League One: 2005
- Chinese Jia-B League: 2002
