= Mao Biao =

Chinese footballer

Mao Biao 毛彪
Personal information
- Date of birth: July 24, 1987 (age 39)
- Place of birth: Tianjin, China
- Height: 1.83 m (6 ft 0 in)
- Positions: Striker; winger

Team information
- Current team: Jiangxi Dingnan United (head coach)

Youth career
- Tianjin TEDA

Senior career*
Years	Team	Apps	(Gls)
2005–2017	Tianjin TEDA	164	(19)

International career^{‡}
2009	China	1	(0)

Managerial career
- 2019–2022: Tianjin Teda U-10
- 2023–2024: Heilongjiang Ice City (assistant)
- 2026–: Jiangxi Dingnan United
- * Club domestic league appearances and goals as of 30 October 2016 ‡ National team caps and goals as of 1 Jan 2013

Mao Biao (Chinese: 毛彪; pinyin: Máo Biāo; born July 24, 1987, in Tianjin) is a Chinese football coach and former footballer who played as a striker.

== Club career ==
A graduate of the Tianjin TEDA youth team Mao Biao broke into the senior team in the opening game of the 2005 league season against Liaoning Zhongyu, where he also scored his debut goal in a 5–1 win. Throughout the season Mao Biao found himself gaining significant playing time, though often coming on as a substitute he was nevertheless able to play in fifteen league games by the end of the season. This was to continue throughout the following season where he was able to further his reputation at Tianjin by playing in twenty-two league games.

Mao Biao, however did not rise to prominence until the 2008 league season when he was able to strike a partnership with Éber Luís Cucchi that saw Tianjin come fourth in the league and a chance to play in the AFC Champions League. At the 2009 AFC Champions League he played in six games and scored one goal as the team were knocked out in the group stages, while back within the league he was unable to replicate the same success he achieved with Éber Luís Cucchi.

== International career ==
Mao Biao made his international debut against Saudi Arabia on June 4, 2009, in a 4–1 loss coming on as a substitute for Gao Lin.

== Coaching career ==
In 2023 season, Mao joined China League One club Heilongjiang Ice City as assistant coach.

On 14 December 2025, Mao was appointed as the head coach of Jiangxi Dingnan United in 2026 season.

== Honours ==
- Chinese FA Cup: 2011
