= Cao Yang =

Chinese international football player

Cao Yang 曹阳
Personal information
- Date of birth: 15 December 1981 (age 44)
- Place of birth: Tianjin, China
- Height: 1.85 m (6 ft 1 in)
- Positions: Defender; midfielder

Team information
- Current team: China U-17 (assistant coach)

Senior career*
Years	Team	Apps	(Gls)
2000–2019	Tianjin TEDA	387	(53)

International career
1999-2000	China U19		
2002	China U23		
2002–2009	China	32	(2)

Managerial career
- 2020: Tianjin TEDA Reverse (assistant)
- 2021–: China U-17 (assistant)
Medal record
Representing China
Men's football
AFC Youth Championship
Bronze medal – third place	2000 Iran	Team
East Asian Football Championship
Gold medal – first place	2005 South Korea	Team
- * Club domestic league appearances and goals

Cao Yang (simplified Chinese: 曹阳; traditional Chinese: 曹陽; pinyin: Cáo Yáng; born 15 December 1981 in Tianjin) is a Chinese former international football player who played as a versatile defender or midfielder.

== Club career ==
Cao Yang began his career graduating through the Tianjin Teda youth system eventually joining the senior team when he made his league debut on September 17, 2000 against Yunnan Hongta in a 2–1 defeat. The following season, he would further progress within the Tianjin Teda team by playing in ten league games for them. A versatile defender with good offensive and defensive ability who could also play in midfield as well as being physically tall, saw Cao firmly establish himself within as a permanent fixture within the Tianjin team by the end of the 2002 league season.

A regular for the club for several seasons he was named as the reserve captain behind Wang Xiao. In the 2008 Chinese Super League season Tianjin Teda where to have one of their most productive seasons when they finished the league fourth and were allowed the chance to play in the AFC Champions League. During their debut appearance in the AFC Champions League Cao Yang had the honor to be named as their captain against Kawasaki Frontale.

== International career ==
Cao Yang began his international career playing for the Chinese U23 where he was named in the squad to play in the Football at the 2002 Asian Games and saw China knocked out in the Quarter-finals. His performance in the tournament was considered good enough for him to be promoted to the senior team by the Chinese caretaker coach Shen Xiangfu on December 7, 2002 in a friendly game against Syria in a 3–1 victory. With Zhu Guanghu as the national teams coach Cao's international career would start to see him become a regular within the team and he was included in the squad that won the 2005 East Asian Football Championship as well as also being in the squad that took part in the 2007 AFC Asian Cup.

== Career statistics ==
As of 11 November 2018

Club performance			League		Cup		League Cup		Continental		Others		Total	
Season	Club	League	Apps	Goals	Apps	Goals	Apps	Goals	Apps	Goals	Apps	Goals	Apps	Goals
China PR			League		FA Cup		CSL Cup		Asia		Others		Total	
2000	Tianjin TEDA	Chinese Jia-A League	1	0	0	0	-		-		-		1	0
2001	Tianjin TEDA	Chinese Jia-A League	10	0	2	0	-		-		-		12	0
2002	Tianjin TEDA	Chinese Jia-A League	20	2	0	0	-		-		-		20	2
2003	Tianjin TEDA	Chinese Jia-A League	22	5	3	0	-		-		-		25	5
2004	Tianjin TEDA	Chinese Super League	21	1	0	0	5	3	-		-		26	4
2005	Tianjin TEDA	Chinese Super League	26	7	0	0	2	0	-		-		28	7
2006	Tianjin TEDA	Chinese Super League	27	7	4	0	-		-		-		31	7
2007	Tianjin TEDA	Chinese Super League	27	4	-		-		-		-		27	4
2008	Tianjin TEDA	Chinese Super League	29	7	-		-		-		-		29	7
2009	Tianjin TEDA	Chinese Super League	29	7	-		-		3	0	-		32	7
2010	Tianjin TEDA	Chinese Super League	12	1	-		-		-		-		12	1
2011	Tianjin TEDA	Chinese Super League	29	1	3	0	-		7	2	-		39	3
2012	Tianjin TEDA	Chinese Super League	20	1	1	0	-		5	0	1	0	27	1
2013	Tianjin TEDA	Chinese Super League	24	4	0	0	-		-		-		24	4
2014	Tianjin TEDA	Chinese Super League	13	1	0	0	-		-		-		13	1
2016	Tianjin TEDA	Chinese Super League	25	3	1	0	-		-		-		26	3
2017	Tianjin TEDA	Chinese Super League	16	2	1	0	-		-		-		17	2
2018	Tianjin TEDA	Chinese Super League	26	0	0	0	-		-		-		26	0
2019	Tianjin TEDA	Chinese Super League	10	1	3	0	-		-		-		13	1
Career total			387	54	18	0	7	3	15	2	1	0	428	59

== Honours ==
=== Club ===
Tianjin TEDA

- Chinese FA Cup: 2011

=== Country ===
- East Asian Football Championship: 2005
