= He Yang =

Chinese footballer

He Yang 何杨
Personal information
- Full name: He Yang
- Date of birth: 23 February 1983 (age 43)
- Place of birth: Tianjin, China
- Height: 1.86 m (6 ft 1 in)
- Positions: Right-back; centre-back

Senior career*
Years	Team	Apps	(Gls)
2002–2014	Tianjin Teda	99	(3)
2015–2016	Qingdao Jonoon	48	(0)
2017	Zhejiang Yiteng	23	(1)
2018–2020	Chengdu Better City	35	(0)

International career^{‡}
2009–2010	China	5	(0)

Managerial career
- 2021–2023: Chengdu Rongcheng U-21 (assistant)
- 2024–: Chengdu Rongcheng B (assistant)
Medal record
Representing China
Men's football
EAFF Championship
Gold medal – first place	2010 Japan	Team
- * Club domestic league appearances and goals as of 31 December 2020 ‡ National team caps and goals as of 1 March 2013

He Yang (simplified Chinese: 何杨; traditional Chinese: 何楊; pinyin: Hé Yáng; born 23 February 1983 in Tianjin) is a former Chinese international footballer.

== Club career ==
While He Yang graduated from the Tianjin Teda youth team during the 2002 league season he struggled to break into the first team until the 2003 league season when he made thirteen league appearances. Often coming on as a substitute throughout much of his career he had difficulty in establishing himself as regular and was often criticised for his lack of concentration within defence, nevertheless he remained with Tianjin even when he was completely dropped from the senior team in the 2008 league season. When the 2009 league season began centre-back Wang Xiao was injured early within the campaign and the coach Zuo Shusheng immediately recalled He Yang back into the team as his replacement, with another chance to prove himself within the team He Yang showed considerable maturity and physical ability that was missing in his earlier career. He Yang would suddenly rise to prominence and establish himself as an integral member within the team, even scoring his debut goal against Shanghai Shenhua on May 16, 2009 in a 1–1 draw. When Arie Haan came into the team as the new coach He Yang would remain an integral part of the team and go on to help Tianjin come runners-up of the 2010 Chinese Super League season.

On 11 February 2015, He transferred to China League One side Qingdao Jonoon. After two seasons he moved to another League One club in Zhejiang Yiteng on 14 January 2017. This was followed by a move to fourth tier club Chengdu Better City in the 2018 Chinese Champions League season where he played an integral part in seeing the club gain successive promotions. At the end of the 2020 China League One season his contract would expire with Chengdu after three seasons with the club. On 24 February 2021, He would announce his retirement from professional football.

== International career ==
He Yang would make his international debut in a friendly against Iran in a 1–0 win on 1 June 2009 where he played the game as a right-back. He would then be included in the squad that won the 2010 East Asian Football Championship but did not play within any of the games.

== Career statistics ==
=== Club statistics ===
As of 31 December 2020.

Appearances and goals by club, season and competition
Club	Season	League			National Cup		League Cup		Continental		Other		Total	
Club	Season	Division	Apps	Goals	Apps	Goals	Apps	Goals	Apps	Goals	Apps	Goals	Apps	Goals
Tianjin Teda	2002	Chinese Jia-A League	0	0	0	0	-		-		-		0	0
Tianjin Teda	2003	Chinese Jia-A League	13	0	1	0	-		-		-		14	0
Tianjin Teda	2004	Chinese Super League	5	0	1	0		0	-		-		6	0
Tianjin Teda	2005	Chinese Super League	3	0	0	0		0	-		-		3	0
Tianjin Teda	2006	Chinese Super League	9	0	0	0	-		-		-		9	0
Tianjin Teda	2007	Chinese Super League	0	0	-		-		-		-		0	0
Tianjin Teda	2008	Chinese Super League	0	0	-		-		-		-		0	0
Tianjin Teda	2009	Chinese Super League	24	3	-		-		4	0	-		28	3
Tianjin Teda	2010	Chinese Super League	19	0	-		-		-		-		19	0
Tianjin Teda	2011	Chinese Super League	7	0	0	0	-		3	0	-		10	0
Tianjin Teda	2012	Chinese Super League	16	0	0	0	-		3	0	1 (Note: Appearances in Chinese FA Super Cup)	0	20	0
Tianjin Teda	2013	Chinese Super League	3	0	1	0	-		-		-		4	0
Tianjin Teda	2014	Chinese Super League	0	0	0	0	-		-		-		0	0
Tianjin Teda	Total		99	3	3	0	0	0	10	0	1	0	113	3
Qingdao Jonoon	2015	China League One	25	0	1	0	-		-		-		26	0
Qingdao Jonoon	2016	China League One	23	0	0	0	-		-		-		23	0
Qingdao Jonoon	Total		48	0	1	0	0	0	0	0	0	0	49	0
Zhejiang Yiteng	2017	China League One	23	1	1	0	-		-		-		24	1
Chengdu Better City	2018	Chinese Champions League	8	0	-		-		-		-		8	0
Chengdu Better City	2019	China League Two	23	0	2	0	-		-		-		25	0
Chengdu Better City	2020	China League One	4	0	0	0	-		-		-		4	0
Chengdu Better City	Total		35	0	2	0	0	0	0	0	0	0	37	0
Career total			205	4	7	0	0	0	10	0	1	0	223	4

== Honours ==
=== Club ===
Tianjin Teda F.C.

- Chinese FA Cup: 2011

=== Country ===
- East Asian Football Championship: 2010
