= List of Chinese football transfers winter 2012 =

This is a list of Chinese football transfers for the 2012 season winter transfer window. Only moves from Super League and League One are listed. The transfer window opened from 1 January 2012 to 2 March 2012.

== Super League ==
=== Beijing Guoan ===
In: Note: Flags indicate national team as defined under FIFA eligibility rules; some limited exceptions apply. Players may hold more than one non-FIFA nationality.

No.	Pos.	Nation	Player
8	MF	POR	Manú (from (Poland) Legia Warsaw)
15	FW	SRB	Andrija Kaluđerović (from (Serbia) Red Star Belgrade)
16	MF	CHN	Zhang Xiaobin (from Tianjin TEDA)
18	DF	CHN	Lang Zheng (loan return from Nanchang Hengyuan)
25	DF	CHN	Jiao Zhe (loan from Shandong Luneng)
28	FW	CHN	Zhang Jian (from Chongqing Lifan)
29	MF	CHN	Shao Jiayi (from (Germany) MSV Duisburg)
33	FW	CHN	Mao Jianqing (from Shaanxi Renhe)
36	GK	CHN	Bai Xiaolei (from Nanchang Hengyuan)
37	FW	BRA	Reinaldo (from (Saudi Arabia) Al-Raed)
-	FW	CHN	Yan Xiangchuang (loan return from Dalian Shide)
-	MF	CHN	Cui Yu (loan return from Qingdao QUST)
-	DF	CHN	Ma Chongchong (loan return from Sichuan Dujiangyan Symbol)
-	GK	CHN	Su Boyang (loan return from Guizhou Zhicheng)
-	MF	CHN	Yao Shuang (loan return from Beijing Baxy)
-	MF	CHN	Xue Fei (loan return from Beijing Baxy)

Out: Note: Flags indicate national team as defined under FIFA eligibility rules; some limited exceptions apply. Players may hold more than one non-FIFA nationality.

No.	Pos.	Nation	Player
11	FW	CHN	Yan Xiangchuang (to Dalian Shide)
15	FW	HON	Walter Julián Martínez (to Chongqing F.C.)
18	MF	CHN	Lu Jiang (loan to Hunan Billows)
23	MF	CHN	Ding Haifeng (to Shenzhen NEO Capital)
27	DF	CHN	Zhang Yonghai (loan to Guangdong Sunray Cave)
28	MF	CHN	Wang Haozhi (to Henan Construction)
29	FW	AUS	Joel Griffiths (to Shanghai Shenhua)
32	MF	CHN	Cui Yu (to Beijing Yitong Kuche)
33	DF	CHN	Ma Chongchong (to Henan Construction)
34	MF	CHN	Zhang Zhaohui (to Chongqing Lifan)
37	MF	CHN	Gao Teng (to Qinghai Senke)
41	FW	SEN	Ladji Keita (loan return to (Portugal) S.C. Braga)
-	GK	CHN	Su Boyang (to Hebei Zhongji)
-	MF	CHN	Yao Shuang (to Beijing Baxy)
-	MF	CHN	Xue Fei (to Beijing Baxy)

=== Changchun Yatai ===
In:

No.	Pos.	Nation	Player
5	DF	BRA	Cássio (from (Cyprus) Ethnikos Achna)
9	FW	BRA	Weldon (from (Romania) CFR Cluj)
10	MF	SRB	Marko Ljubinković (from (Serbia) FK Vojvodina)
14	FW	CHN	Cao Tianbao (loan return from Guangzhou R&F)
40	FW	COL	John Mosquera (from (Germany) Union Berlin)
-	MF	CHN	Hu Xi (loan return from Hubei Wuhan Zhongbo)
-	FW	CHN	Huang Jie (loan return from Hubei Wuhan Zhongbo)

Out:

No.	Pos.	Nation	Player
3	MF	CMR	Modeste M'bami (loan return to Dalian Aerbin)
9	FW	BRA	Nei (Released)
10	FW	BRA	Dori (loan return to (Brazil) Fluminense)
13	DF	CHN	Liu Cheng (to Qinghai Senke)
14	FW	COL	Yovanny Arrechea (loan to Hohhot Dongjin)
17	FW	CHN	Gao Jian (to Qinghai Senke)
22	GK	CHN	Wu Yake (to Guizhou Zhicheng)
25	FW	CHN	Yang He (loan to Chengdu Blades)
29	MF	CHN	Zhang Tianhan (Released)
31	MF	CHN	Hu Xi (to Hubei Zhongbo)
34	DF	CHN	Yan Hai (Released)
38	FW	CHN	Men Yang (to Guangzhou R&F)
39	FW	CHN	Hei Shukun (Released)
-	FW	CHN	Huang Jie (to Qinghai Senke)
-	DF	CHN	Yu Hang (to Yanbian Baekdu Tigers)

=== Dalian Aerbin ===
In:

No.	Pos.	Nation	Player
5	DF	CHN	Jin Pengxiang (from Hangzhou Greentown)
8	MF	BRA	Fábio Rochemback (from (Brazil) Grêmio)
9	FW	AUS	Mile Sterjovski (from (Australia) Perth Glory)
11	FW	NGA	Peter Utaka (from (Denmark) Odense Boldklub)
13	DF	GHA	Lee Addy (from (Serbia) Red Star Belgrade)
19	FW	CHI	Gustavo Canales (from Universidad de Chile)
21	DF	CHN	Chen Lei (from Shenzhen Ruby)
22	FW	CHN	Yu Dabao (from Tianjin Teda)
24	DF	CHN	Liu Yu (from Jiangsu Sainty)
25	DF	CHN	Aidi (from Shanghai East Asia)
33	GK	CHN	Liu Weiguo (from Shandong Luneng)
40	FW	CHN	Dong Xuesheng (from Shanghai Shenhua)
-	FW	CHN	Hou Zhe (loan return from Fujian Smart Hero Leephick)
-	DF	CHN	Yu Zhen (loan return from Fujian Smart Hero Leephick)
-	DF	CHN	Zhang Song (loan return from Fujian Smart Hero Leephick)
-	MF	CMR	Modeste M'bami (loan return from Changchun Yatai)

Out:

No.	Pos.	Nation	Player
4	DF	CHN	Zhang Tianxiang (to Hubei China-Kyle)
5	DF	CHN	Li Longri (to Hubei China-Kyle)
9	FW	CRC	Johnny Woodly (to Fujian Smart Hero Leephick)
10	FW	CHN	Guo Hui (Retired)
16	DF	BUL	Kiril Kotev (Released)
19	DF	CHN	Liu Tianqi (loan return to Shaanxi Renhe)
20	MF	GNB	Almami Moreira (to (Serbia) FK Vojvodina)
26	FW	COL	Luis Carlos Cabezas (loan to Shanghai East Asia)
31	DF	CHN	Xu yihai (to Qinghai Senke)
-	DF	CHN	Zhang Song (to Fujian Smart Hero Leephick)
-	DF	CHN	Yu Zhen (to Shenzhen Main Sports)
-	FW	CHN	Hou Zhe (to Hubei China-Kyle)
-	MF	CMR	Modeste M'bami (Released)

=== Dalian Shide ===
In:

No.	Pos.	Nation	Player
19	FW	CHN	Yan Xiangchuang (from Beijing Guoan)
20	FW	POR	Ricardo Esteves (Free Agent)
23	DF	KOR	Park Dong-Hyuk (from (Japan) Kashiwa Reysol)
-	GK	CHN	Wang Guoming (loan return from Fujian Smart Hero Leephick)
-	GK	CHN	Guo Wei (loan return from Chongqing FC)
-	DF	CRC	Porfirio López (loan return from (Costa Rica) L.D. Alajuelense)
-	DF	KOR	Kim Jin-Kyu (loan return from (Japan) Ventforet Kofu)

Out:

No.	Pos.	Nation	Player
12	FW	CHN	Han Jiabao (loan to Hebei Zhongji)
14	MF	CHN	Wang Xuanhong (to Chongqing Lifan)
19	FW	KOR	Ahn Jung-Hwan (Retired)
20	DF	KOR	Kim Jin-Kyu (to (South Korea) FC Seoul)
28	MF	CHN	Wang Yun (to Shanghai Shenxin)
36	DF	CHN	Yao Bo (loan to Yanbian Baekdu Tigers)
40	GK	CHN	Zhang Zhenqiang (loan to Shanghai Shenxin)
41	FW	CHN	Yan Xiangchuang (loan return to Beijing Guoan)
42	DF	UZB	Murod Kholmukhamedov (loan return to (Uzbekistan) Pakhtakor Tashkent)
-	GK	CHN	Wang Guoming (to Fujian Smart Hero Leephick)
-	GK	CHN	Guo Wei (to Chongqing FC)
-	DF	CHN	Lu Qiang (to Guizhou Renhe)
-	DF	CRC	Porfirio López (to (United States) Philadelphia Union)

=== Guangzhou Evergrande ===
In:

No.	Pos.	Nation	Player
4	DF	CHN	Rong Hao (from Hangzhou Greentown)
8	MF	CHN	Qin Sheng (from Liaoning Whowin)
19	DF	CHN	Li Jianbin (from Chengdu Blades)
25	MF	CHN	Peng Xinli (from Chengdu Blades)
35	FW	CHN	Memet Ali (from Xinjiang Youth)
37	MF	CHN	Zhao Xuri (from Shaanxi Chanba)

Out:

No.	Pos.	Nation	Player
18	DF	CHN	Chen Jianlong (to Nanchang Hengyuan)
19	MF	CHN	Yang Hao (to Shaanxi Chanba)
25	MF	CHN	Yang Yihu (to Shaanxi Chanba)
35	DF	CHN	Guo Zichao (to Guangdong Sunray Cave)
39	DF	CHN	Zhang Tianlong (to Shenzhen NEO Capital)
40	DF	CHN	Pan Weiye (to Shenzhen Main Sports)

=== Guangzhou R&F ===
In:

No.	Pos.	Nation	Player
1	GK	CHN	Cheng Yuelei (from Shenzhen Ruby)
8	MF	BRA	Jumar (from (Brazil) CR Vasco da Gama)
10	MF	BRA	Davi (from (Brazil) Coritiba)
11	FW	BRA	Rafael Coelho (from (Brazil) Desportivo Brasil)
13	MF	CHN	Wu Wei'an (from Tianjin Teda)
18	FW	CHN	Zhang Yuan (from Chengdu Blades)
23	MF	CHN	Lu Lin (from Guangdong Sunray Cave)
31	FW	BRA	Leonardo (loan from (Brazil) Coritiba)
35	MF	AUS	Rostyn Griffiths (from (Australia) Central Coast Mariners)
36	FW	CHN	Men Yang (from Changchun Yatai)

Out:

No.	Pos.	Nation	Player
8	MF	SRB	Aleksandar Živković (Released)
10	MF	BRA	Harison (to (Brazil) Paysandu Sport Club)
14	FW	CHN	Cao Tianbao (loan return to Changchun Yatai)
18	FW	ENG	Marlon Harewood (to (England) Nottingham Forest)
30	GK	CHN	Teng Shangkun (loan return to Hangzhou Greentown)

=== Guizhou Renhe ===
In:

No.	Pos.	Nation	Player
2	DF	CHN	Wu Wei (from Hangzhou Greentown)
7	DF	ESP	Nano (from (Spain) Levante UD)
9	FW	BIH	Zlatan Muslimović (Free Agent)
11	FW	ESP	Rafa Jordà (from (Spain) Levante UD)
14	FW	CHN	Yang Yihu (from Guangzhou Evergrande)
16	DF	CHN	Lu Qiang (from Dalian Shide)
19	DF	CHN	Liu Tianqi (loan return from Dalian Aerbin)
20	MF	ARG	Gustavo Rodas (from (Ecuador) Deportivo Quito)
28	DF	CHN	Dong Yang (from Beijing Baxy)
29	MF	CHN	Yang Hao (from Guangzhou Evergrande)
-	FW	CHN	Mao Jianqing (loan return from Hangzhou Greentown)
-	FW	CHN	Chen Zijie (loan return from Shanghai East Asia)
-	DF	CHN	Cao Huan (loan return from Hunan Billows)
-	MF	CHN	Du Fa (loan return from Chongqing F.C.)

Out:

No.	Pos.	Nation	Player
2	DF	SRB	Miloš Bajalica (to (Japan) Kyoto Sanga F.C.)
4	MF	ITA	Fabio Firmani (Released)
7	MF	CHN	Zhao Xuri (to Guangzhou Evergrande)
10	FW	BRA	Wilson (to (Japan) Vegalta Sendai)
11	FW	SCO	Derek Riordan (to (Scotland) St Johnstone)
14	DF	CHN	Li Chenguang (to Hubei China-Kyle)
19	MF	CHN	Xu Qing (to Chongqing F.C.)
20	MF	CHN	Zhu Jiawei (to Nanchang Hengyuan)
28	DF	CHN	Han Weichen (Released)
29	MF	CHN	Zhang Ke (to Henan Construction)
33	FW	CHN	Mao Jianqing (to Beijing Guoan)
36	MF	CHN	Xu Xiang (loan to Shaanxi Laochenggen)
37	DF	CHN	Zheng Bo (loan to Shaanxi Laochenggen)
38	DF	CHN	Liu Shiyu (loan to Shaanxi Laochenggen)
39	DF	CHN	Jing Guodong (loan to Shaanxi Laochenggen)
-	DF	CHN	Cao Huan (to Hunan Billows)
-	FW	CHN	Chen Zijie (loan to Shanghai East Asia)
-	MF	CHN	Du Fa (to Wuhan Zall)

=== Hangzhou Greentown ===
In:

No.	Pos.	Nation	Player
2	DF	KOR	Jeong Dong-Ho (loan from (Japan) Yokohama F. Marinos)
3	DF	KOR	Kim Dong-Jin (from (South Korea) FC Seoul)
4	DF	CHN	Cai Shun (loan return from Hubei Wuhan Zhongbo)
9	FW	BRA	Mazola (loan from (Brazil) São Paulo)
10	FW	BRA	Renatinho (loan from (Uruguay) C.A. Rentistas)
11	MF	BRA	Fabrício (loan from (Portugal) Portimonense S.C.)
12	MF	CHN	Cai Chuchuan (Free Agent)
-	GK	CHN	Teng Shangkun (loan return from Guangzhou R&F)

Out:

No.	Pos.	Nation	Player
2	DF	CHN	Wu Shaokun (Released)
3	DF	AUS	Adam Griffiths (Released)
4	DF	CHN	Rong Hao (to Guangzhou Evergrande)
9	FW	HON	Luis Ramírez (to (Honduras) Marathón)
11	MF	URU	Paulo Pezzolano (to (Mexico) Club Necaxa)
12	MF	CHN	Shen Longyuan (to Chongqing F.C.)
14	DF	CHN	Jin Pengxiang (to Dalian Aerbin)
17	FW	CHN	Tan Yang (Released)
21	MF	URU	Sebastián Vázquez (loan return to (Uruguay) Danubio)
22	GK	CHN	Teng Shangkun (loan to Chongqing F.C.)
25	DF	CHN	Jiao Zhe (loan return to Shandong Luneng Taishan)
26	MF	CHN	Wang Quan (to Hubei China-Kyle)
28	DF	CHN	Wu Wei (to Guizhou Renhe)
36	GK	CHN	Huang Yuandong (to Shenzhen Main Sports)
38	FW	CHN	Wang Peng (to Kunming Ruilong)
39	FW	CHN	Cui Wenjun (to Hubei China-Kyle)
40	MF	CHN	Chen Tao (Released)
41	FW	HON	Randy Diamond (loan return to (Honduras) Marathón)
42	FW	CHN	Mao Jianqing (loan return to Shaanxi Renhe)
-	FW	CHN	Xiao Yifeng (to Guangdong Sunray Cave)
-	DF	CHN	Qu Tianbao (to Tianjin Songjiang)
-	MF	CHN	Yang Jinxian (Released)

=== Henan Construction ===
In:

No.	Pos.	Nation	Player
2	DF	KOR	Son Seung-Joon (from (South Korea) Jeonbuk Hyundai Motors)
5	DF	TUN	Enis Hajri (from (Bulgaria) Chernomorets)
12	DF	CHN	Ma Chongchong (from Beijing Guoan)
13	MF	CHN	Abduwali Ablet (from Shenzhen)
20	MF	CHN	Zhang Ke (from Guizhou Renhe)
24	MF	CHN	Wang Haozhi (from Beijing Guoan)

Out:

No.	Pos.	Nation	Player
2	DF	BRA	Fabão (to (Brazil) Comercial)
5	MF	CHN	Wang Shouting (to Liaoning Whowin)
12	GK	CHN	Zhang Shichang (to Shenzhen Ruby)
13	FW	CHN	Yu Le (to Shenzhen Ruby)
20	FW	KOR	Lee Joon-Yeob (Released)
21	FW	CHN	Ling Sihao (to Shenzhen Ruby)
24	FW	CHN	Wang Junchi (to Qinghai Senke)
25	DF	CHN	Hao Shuang (to Qinghai Senke)
26	DF	CHN	Wang Chi (to Qinghai Senke)
29	FW	CHN	Su Jingyu (to Hebei Zhongji)
30	MF	CHN	Qi Yunfei (to Hubei China-Kyle)
34	DF	CHN	Qi Fang (to Qinghai Senke)
35	MF	CHN	Cao Bin (loan to Jiangxi Liansheng)
36	MF	CHN	Zhu Shiyue (Released)
41	GK	CHN	Dang Zhao (to Hebei Zhongji)

=== Jiangsu Sainty ===
In:

No.	Pos.	Nation	Player
4	DF	CHN	Xu Youzhi (from Chongqing Lifan)
6	DF	CHN	Jiang Jiajun (from Shanghai Shenhua)
7	FW	SRB	Miljan Mrdaković (from (Cyprus) AEK Larnaca)
11	FW	CHN	Wang Yunlong (from Shanghai East Asia)
16	MF	CHN	Deng Zhuoxiang (from Shandong Luneng)
29	MF	CHN	Liu Ji (loan return from Guizhou Zhicheng)
-	DF	CHN	Wang Xiang (loan return from Chongqing FC)

Out:

No.	Pos.	Nation	Player
7	FW	CHN	Tan Si (to Wuhan Zall)
13	MF	CHN	Zhang Bo (to Chengdu Blades)
16	DF	CHN	Qiu Bing (to Qinghai Senke)
21	MF	PER	Paolo de la Haza (to (Peru) Universidad César Vallejo)
25	MF	CHN	Liu Qing (loan to Qinghai Senke)
30	DF	CHN	Tang Jing (Retired)
37	DF	CHN	Liu Yu (to Dalian Aerbin)
40	GK	CHN	Lu Zheyu (loan return to Tianjin TEDA)
-	DF	CHN	Wang Xiang (to Hebei Zhongji)

=== Liaoning Whowin ===
In:

No.	Pos.	Nation	Player
7	MF	CHN	Zhang Jingyang (from Fushun Xinye)
10	MF	MKD	Vlatko Grozdanoski (from (North Macedonia) FK Vardar)
14	FW	SRB	Miloš Trifunović (from (Serbia) Red Star Belgrade)
19	MF	ARG	Pablo Brandán (from (Romania) Steaua București)
22	MF	CHN	Wang Liang (from Shandong Luneng)
24	DF	CHN	Hao Yonghe (from Shenyang Shenbei)
32	DF	CHN	Song Chen (from Shenzhen NEO Capital)
37	MF	CHN	Wang Shouting (from Henan Construction)
39	MF	CHN	Zhao Hongxu (from Shandong Luneng)

Out:

No.	Pos.	Nation	Player
2	DF	CHN	Li Yi'nan (to Shenyang Dongjin)
10	FW	BRA	Valdo (to Chengdu Blades)
17	DF	CHN	Zang Haili (Retired)
23	MF	CHN	Xing Xufei (to Harbin Yiteng)
26	MF	CHN	Qin Sheng (to Guangzhou Evergrande)
30	FW	CHN	Chen Xing (to Shenyang Shenbei)
32	MF	SRB	Vladimir Bogdanović (to (Bulgaria) Lokomotiv Sofia)
35	DF	AUS	Dean Heffernan (to (Australia) Perth Glory)
38	FW	CMR	Jean Michel N'Lend (Released)
39	FW	CHN	Ma Shuai (Released)

=== Qingdao Jonoon ===
In:

No.	Pos.	Nation	Player
11	FW	CRO	Krunoslav Lovrek (from (South Korea) Jeonbuk Hyundai Motors)
16	MF	CHN	Feng Tao (Free Agent)
35	DF	CHN	Gong Yaotong (from Shandong Luneng)

Out:

No.	Pos.	Nation	Player
9	FW	BRA	Éber Luís (to (Brazil) Chapecoense)
16	DF	CHN	Huang Zhun (to Shenyang Dongjin)
18	DF	CHN	Qian Ding (Released)
28	MF	CHN	Hu Jun (to (Portugal) Varzim)
30	MF	CHN	Zhang Fengyu (to Hebei Zhongji)
35	MF	CHN	Xu Tong (Released)
45	MF	CHN	Wang Peng (loan to Sichuan FC)
48	DF	CHN	Liu Haonan (loan to Shandong Youth)
57	DF	CHN	Yan Tengfei (loan to Sichuan FC)

=== Shandong Luneng ===
In:

No.	Pos.	Nation	Player
20	FW	CHN	Wang Gang (loan return from (Portugal) S.C. Covilhã)
29	FW	BRA	Gilberto Macena (from (Denmark) AC Horsens)
-	DF	CHN	Jiao Zhe (loan return from Hangzhou Greentown)

Out:

No.	Pos.	Nation	Player
1	GK	CHN	Li Leilei (Retired)
17	MF	HON	Julio César de León (to (Honduras) C.D. Motagua)
20	MF	CHN	Wang Liang (to Liaoning Whowin)
21	MF	CHN	Deng Zhuoxiang (to Jiangsu Sainty)
29	DF	CPV	Ricardo (to (Portugal) F.C. Paços de Ferreira)
31	FW	CHN	Yu Shuai (Released)
32	DF	CHN	Gong Yaotong (to Qingdao Jonoon)
33	DF	CHN	Ren Yongshun (to Qinghai Senke)
36	GK	CHN	Liu Weiguo (to Dalian Aerbin)
37	MF	CHN	Wang Boren (to Qinghai Senke)
38	MF	CHN	Zhao Wan (to Qinghai Senke)
39	MF	CHN	Zhao Hongxu (to Liaoning Whowin)
40	DF	CHN	Liu Zhao (Released)
-	DF	CHN	Jiao Zhe (loan to Beijing Guoan)

=== Shanghai Shenhua ===
In:

No.	Pos.	Nation	Player
3	DF	BRA	Moisés (from (Qatar) Al Rayyan)
9	FW	FRA	Mathieu Manset (loan from (England) Reading)
16	MF	CHN	Wang Fei (Free Agent)
19	DF	CHN	Zheng Kaimu (from Chongqing F.C.)
24	MF	CHN	Wang Yang (loan return from (Lithuania) FK Sūduva)
25	MF	BIH	Mario Božić (from (Serbia) FK Borac Čačak)
29	FW	AUS	Joel Griffiths (from Beijing Guoan)
32	MF	CHN	Gu Bin (loan return from (Lithuania) FK Sūduva)
39	FW	FRA	Nicolas Anelka (from (England) Chelsea)
-	FW	CHN	Dong Xuesheng (loan return from Shenzhen)
-	GK	CHN	Zhang Chen (loan return from Shenyang Dongjin)

Out:

No.	Pos.	Nation	Player
1	GK	CHN	Dong Lei (to Beijing Baxy)
3	DF	CHN	Xin Feng (to Wuhan Zall)
9	FW	ARG	Luis Salmerón (loan return to (Argentina) Talleres de Córdoba)
14	DF	COL	Juan Camilo Angulo (Released)
16	FW	CHN	Wen Huyi (to Shenyang Shenbei)
18	DF	CHN	Jiang Jiajun (to Jiangsu Sainty)
19	FW	CHN	Dong Xuesheng (to Dalian Aerbin)
21	MF	ARG	Facundo Pérez Castro (Released)
38	FW	COL	Eisner Iván Loboa (loan return to (Colombia) Deportivo Pasto)
-	GK	CHN	Zhang Chen (to Chengdu Blades)

=== Shanghai Shenxin ===
In:

No.	Pos.	Nation	Player
1	GK	CHN	Wu Yansheng (Free Agent)
8	FW	BRA	Jaílton Paraíba (from (Brazil) Mirassol)
9	MF	CHN	Zhu Jiawei (from Shaanxi Chanba)
10	FW	BRA	Anselmo (from (Brazil) Atlético Goianiense)
12	FW	BRA	Antônio Flávio (from (Sweden) AIK Fotboll)
20	MF	CHN	Wang Yun (from Dalian Shide)
23	DF	CHN	Chen Jianlong (from Guangzhou Evergrande)
24	MF	CHN	Zhang Yudong (from Shanghai East Asia)
26	DF	BRA	Johnny (from (Brazil) Corinthians Alagoano)
29	MF	AUS	Jonas Salley (from Chengdu Blades)
32	FW	CHN	Jiang Xiaochen (Free Agent)
36	GK	CHN	Zhang Zhenqiang (loan from Dalian Shide)
-	MF	CHN	Zhang Lifeng (loan return from Guizhou Toro)

Out:

No.	Pos.	Nation	Player
1	GK	CHN	Bai Xiaolei (to Beijing Guoan)
4	DF	CHN	Lang Zheng (loan return to Beijing Guoan)
8	MF	CHN	Liu Yintao (Released)
9	FW	BRA	di Carmo (loan return to (Brazil) Ituiutaba)
12	MF	BRA	Camilo (loan return to (Brazil) Cruzeiro)
13	DF	KOR	Ko Jae-Sung (to (South Korea) Gyeongnam FC)
18	FW	CHN	Zhang Tiangang (Released)
24	DF	CHN	Wang Weilong (to Shenzhen Ruby)
26	DF	BRA	Johnny (loan return to (Brazil) Alagoano)
29	FW	CHN	Teng Bin (to Qinghai Senke)
31	MF	CHN	Lin Pei (loan to Shaanxi Daqin)
32	MF	CHN	Chen Zhizhao (loan to (Brazil) Corinthians)
34	MF	CHN	Jiang Kewei (Released)
36	MF	CHN	Zhang Jun (to Jiangxi Liansheng)
37	DF	CHN	Hu Shengdi (to Shaanxi Daqin)
47	FW	BRA	Paulo Roberto (loan return to (Brazil) Bragantino)
48	DF	CHN	Wang Jian (loan to Jiangxi Liansheng)
-	MF	CHN	Zhang Lifeng (to Hebei Zhongji)

=== Tianjin Teda ===
In:

No.	Pos.	Nation	Player
3	DF	CHN	Li Hongyang (from Chengdu Blades)
4	FW	AUS	Milan Susak (from (Australia) Adelaide United)
6	DF	ROU	Lucian Goian (from (Romania) Astra Ploieşti)
9	MF	CHN	Zhou Liao (from Hubei Wuhan Zhongbo)
16	FW	ENG	Akpo Sodje (from (Scotland) Hibernian)
17	MF	CHN	Hui Jiakang (from Chengdu Blades)
23	GK	CHN	Lu Zheyu (loan return from Jiangsu Sainty)
28	FW	NED	Sjoerd Ars (loan from (Bulgaria) PFC Levski Sofia)
29	MF	MKD	Veliče Šumulikoski (from (Russia) Sibir Novosibirsk)
-	DF	CHN	Mao Kaiyu (loan return from Shenyang Dongjin)
-	MF	CHN	Lü Wei (loan return from Shenyang Dongjin)
-	MF	CHN	Li Xingcan (loan return from Shenyang Shenbei)
-	DF	CHN	Cui Zhongkai (loan return from Shenyang Shenbei)

Out:

No.	Pos.	Nation	Player
4	DF	CHN	Wu Ze (Retired)
6	DF	SRB	Marko Zorić (to (Serbia) Banat Zrenjanin)
13	MF	CHN	Bai Yuexuan (loan to Hunan Billows)
16	MF	CHN	Zhang Xiaobin (to Beijing Guoan)
21	MF	CHN	Han Yanming (to Fujian Smart Hero)
22	FW	CHN	Yu Dabao (to Dalian Aerbin)
23	MF	CHN	Wu Wei'an (to Guangzhou R&F)
28	FW	CHN	Lu Yang (to Hebei Zhongji)
29	FW	CHN	Fan Baiqun (loan to Shenyang Shenbei)
31	MF	CHN	Han Cai (to Hebei Zhongji)
32	DF	CHN	Jia Yudong (loan to Hebei Zhongji)
35	FW	ARG	Luciano Olguín (to Hohhot Dongjin)
37	FW	CHN	Mu Yutan (Released)
38	MF	CHN	Xu Xiaolong (to Hebei Zhongji)
40	MF	CHN	Li Yaoyue (loan to Tianjin Songjiang)
42	FW	ROU	Marius Bilaşco (to (Germany) Energie Cottbus)
44	MF	KOR	Song Chong-Gug (Retired)
-	MF	CHN	Li Xingcan (to Shenyang Shenbei)
-	DF	CHN	Cui Zhongkai (to Beijing Baxy)
-	MF	CHN	Pang Lei (to Hebei Zhongji)
-	FW	CHN	Gao Yunfei (to Hebei Zhongji)
-	DF	CHN	Mao Kaiyu (to Hohhot Dongjin)
-	MF	CHN	Lü Wei (to Hohhot Dongjin)
-	DF	CHN	Li Xiang (to Hohhot Dongjin)

== League One ==
=== Beijing Baxy ===
In:

No.	Pos.	Nation	Player
4	MF	GHA	Daniel Quaye (from Yanbian Baekdu Tigers)
6	DF	CRO	Saša Mus (from (Bosnia and Herzegovina) NK GOŠK Gabela)
9	FW	BRA	Júnior Paulista (from Tianjin Songjiang)
14	MF	KOR	Shin Eun-Seok (from (South Korea) Ansan Hallelujah)
15	MF	CHN	Zhang Yong (from Tianjin Songjiang)
21	MF	TPE	Chen Hao-wei (from (Chinese Taipei) Hasus NTCPE)
22	GK	CHN	Dong Lei (from Shanghai Shenhua)
26	DF	CHN	Cui Zhongkai (from Tianjin Teda)
27	MF	CHN	Yao Shuang (from Beijing Guoan)
28	MF	CHN	Xue Fei (from Beijing Guoan)
29	MF	CHN	Li Jun (from Yanbian Baekdu Tigers)

Out:

No.	Pos.	Nation	Player
3	MF	CHN	Liu Junpeng (to Fujian Smart Hero)
4	MF	CHN	Ji Nan (to Beijing Yitong Kuche)
9	FW	CHN	Wang Jingchao (to Qinghai Senke)
15	MF	CHN	Shang Zhipu (to Beijing Yitong Kuche)
16	DF	CHN	Hui Yi (to Qinghai Senke)
21	MF	CHN	Wang Qiancheng (Released)
23	FW	CHN	Jiang Zhongxiao (to Shaanxi Daqin)
25	DF	URU	Máximo Lucas (Released)
26	MF	CHN	Tang Tao (to Beijing Yitong Kuche)
27	MF	CHN	Yao Shuang (loan return to Beijing Guoan)
28	DF	CHN	Dong Yang (to Guizhou Renhe)
29	DF	CMR	Paul Essola (Released)
32	MF	CHN	Wen Bo (to Beijing Yitong Kuche)
33	GK	CHN	Li Lei (to Beijing Yitong Kuche)
34	FW	URU	Diego Seoane (Released)
35	MF	CHN	Xue Fei (loan return to Beijing Guoan)
36	DF	MNE	Vlado Jeknić (to Fujian Smart Hero)

=== Beijing Technology ===
In:

No.	Pos.	Nation	Player
3	MF	KOR	Lee In-Shik (from (South Korea) Cheonan City FC)
10	FW	URU	Matías Alonso Vallejo (from (Spain) Zamora CF)
13	MF	CHN	Li Sichen (Free Agent)
15	DF	CHN	He Zichao (Free Agent)
28	DF	CHN	Lu Yushuo (Free Agent)
30	DF	CHN	Jin Huirong (Free Agent)
32	FW	CMR	Vicent Rodrigue (Free Agent)
40	GK	CHN	Chi Yong (Free Agent)

Out:

No.	Pos.	Nation	Player
3	DF	CHN	Yao Yuan (Released)
6	MF	CHN	Yu Fei (Released)
7	MF	KOR	Chae Wan-Ji (Released)
8	MF	CHN	Yuan Wei (Released)
9	MF	URU	Héctor García (Released)
10	FW	CHN	Sun Shang (Released)
15	FW	CHN	Nie Hui (Released)
17	MF	URU	Julio Gutiérrez (to (Uruguay) Cerro Largo FC)
28	DF	CHN	Zhang Jingya (Released)
35	DF	CHN	Wang Hao (Released)

=== Chengdu Blades ===
In:

No.	Pos.	Nation	Player
1	GK	CHN	Zhang Chen (from Shanghai Shenhua)
6	MF	CHN	Wang Kai (from Chongqing Lifan)
9	FW	BRA	Ygor de Souza (Free Agent)
10	FW	BRA	Valdo (from Liaoning Whowin)
15	MF	CHN	Zhang Bo (from Jiangsu Sainty)
23	FW	CHN	Yang He (loan from Changchun Yatai)
26	DF	CHN	Arpati Mijiti (from Xinjiang Youth)
33	DF	BRA	João Paulo (from (Brazil) Santo André)
36	DF	BRA	William (from Hunan Billows)
37	FW	CHN	Xiang Pei (from Chongqing Youth)
38	GK	CHN	Mu Xiaochen (from Fushun Xinye)
39	MF	CHN	Zhang Li (from Chongqing Lifan)
-	MF	AUS	Jonas Salley (loan return from (Australia) Gold Coast United)

Out:

No.	Pos.	Nation	Player
1	GK	CHN	Wang Haoyi (to Hunan Billows)
4	DF	CHN	Li Jianbin (to Guangzhou Evergrande)
5	MF	AUS	Jonas Salley (to Shanghai Shenxin)
6	MF	CHN	Zou Peng (to Shenzhen Main Sports)
8	MF	CHN	Li Gang (to Wuhan Zall)
11	FW	CHN	Zhang Yuan (to Guangzhou R&F F.C.)
14	DF	CHN	Hu Wei (loan return to Chongqing Lifan)
15	FW	CHN	Yang Changpeng (to Shenzhen Fengpeng)
17	MF	CHN	Hui Jiakang (to Tianjin TEDA)
20	FW	COL	Romero (Released)
21	MF	CHN	Zhang Li (loan return to Chongqing Lifan)
23	DF	CHN	Li Hongyang (to Tianjin TEDA)
25	MF	CHN	Peng Xinli (to Guangzhou Evergrande)
26	MF	CHN	Wang Kai (loan return to Chongqing Lifan)
32	FW	CHN	Lei Yongchi (to Shenyang Shenbei)
36	DF	CHN	Liu Jialin (loan return to Chongqing Lifan)
37	FW	AUS	Brendon Šantalab (to Chongqing Lifan)
38	MF	MLT	John Hutchinson (loan return to (Australia) Central Coast Mariners)

=== Chongqing F.C. ===
In:

No.	Pos.	Nation	Player
4	DF	COL	Rafael Enrique Pérez (from (Colombia) Real Cartagena)
7	MF	CHN	Xu Qing (from Guizhou Renhe)
9	FW	NZL	Chris Killen (from Shenzhen Ruby)
10	MF	CHN	Li Fei (from Shenzhen Ruby)
12	DF	CHN	Wang Sheng (from Fushun Xinye)
15	FW	HON	Walter Julián Martínez (from Beijing Guoan)
16	DF	CHN	Cui Qi (from Liaoning Youth)
19	MF	CHN	Shen Longyuan (from Hangzhou Greentown)
23	GK	CHN	Guo Wei (from Dalian Shide)
30	GK	CHN	Teng Shangkun (loan from Hangzhou Greentown)

Out:

No.	Pos.	Nation	Player
3	DF	CHN	Wang Xiang (loan return to Jiangsu Sainty)
4	DF	CHN	Zhong Peiwei (to Tianjin Songjiang)
6	FW	CHN	Wan Cheng (to Tianjin Songjiang)
7	MF	CHN	Di You (to Shenzhen Fengpeng)
9	FW	CHN	Zhi Yaqi (to Shenzhen Fengpeng)
10	FW	CHN	Wang Yang (Retired)
12	GK	CHN	Han Zhen (to Hebei Zhongji)
18	MF	CHN	Wang Xiaolong (to Guizhou Zhicheng)
19	MF	CHN	Gui Zheng (Released)
20	MF	CHN	Li Jie (Released)
21	DF	CHN	Jiang Xia (Released)
22	DF	CHN	Zheng Kaimu (to Shanghai Shenhua)
23	GK	CHN	Guo Wei (loan return to Dalian Shide)
24	MF	CHN	Du Fa (loan return to Guizhou Renhe)
25	MF	CHN	Chen Yongran (to Shenzhen Fengpeng)
26	DF	CHN	Lin Xinhao (Released)
28	DF	CHN	Yi Chaoyuan (Released)

=== Chongqing Lifan ===
In:

No.	Pos.	Nation	Player
4	DF	PAR	Nelson Cabrera (from (Chile) Colo-Colo)
8	MF	CHN	Wang Hongliang (Free Agent)
9	FW	BRA	Guto (from (Brazil) Sport Club Internacional)
10	FW	AUS	Brendon Šantalab (from Chengdu Blades)
11	MF	CHN	Wang Xuanhong (from Dalian Shide)
12	MF	CHN	Zhang Zhaohui (from Beijing Guoan)
30	DF	CHN	Han Qingsong (from Yanbian Quanyang Spring)
-	MF	CHN	Wang Kai (loan return from Chengdu Tiancheng)
-	MF	CHN	Zhang Li (loan return from Chengdu Tiancheng)
-	DF	CHN	Hu Wei (loan return from Chengdu Tiancheng)
-	DF	CHN	Liu Jialin (loan return from Chengdu Tiancheng)

Out:

No.	Pos.	Nation	Player
6	MF	CHN	Zhou Heng (to Wuhan Zall)
7	MF	CHN	Luo Yi (to Wuhan Zall)
9	FW	BIH	Želimir Terkeš (to (Croatia) NK Zadar)
10	FW	CRO	Ivan Bošnjak (to (Croatia) HNK Rijeka)
11	FW	CHN	Zhang Jian (to Beijing Guoan)
24	DF	CHN	Xu Youzhi (to Jiangsu Sainty)
30	DF	CRO	Dario Dabac (to Shenyang Shenbei)
33	FW	ANG	Johnson Macaba (to (Brazil) Grêmio Catanduvense)
-	MF	CHN	Wang Kai (to Chengdu Tiancheng)
-	MF	CHN	Zhang Li (to Chengdu Tiancheng)
-	DF	CHN	Hu Wei (to Fujian Smart Hero)
-	DF	CHN	Liu Jialin (Released)

=== Fujian Smart Hero ===
In:

No.	Pos.	Nation	Player
3	MF	CHN	Liu Junpeng (from Beijing Baxy)
5	DF	MNE	Vlado Jeknić (from Beijing Baxy)
6	MF	KOR	Park Jung-Soo (from (South Korea) Busan Kyotong)
8	DF	CHN	Zhang Song (from Dalian Aerbin)
9	FW	CRC	Johnny Woodly (from Dalian Aerbin)
10	MF	CHN	Han Yanming (from Tianjin Teda)
12	GK	CHN	Wang Guoming (from Dalian Shide)
14	MF	CHN	Qiu Shi (Free Agent)
22	MF	CHN	Sun Shilin (from Fushun Xinye)
23	DF	CHN	Hu Wei (from Chongqing Lifan)
25	MF	NED	Sylvano Comvalius (from (Kazakhstan) FC Atyrau)
26	DF	CHN	Yang Deliang (from Hohhot Dongjin)
28	MF	CHN	Cheng Mouyi (Free Agent)

Out:

No.	Pos.	Nation	Player
1	GK	CHN	Qi Min (Released)
5	DF	CHN	Wang Chao (Retired)
6	DF	CHN	Yu Zhen (loan return to Dalian Aerbin)
8	DF	CHN	Zhang Song (loan return to Dalian Aerbin)
9	FW	CHN	Hou Zhe (loan return to Dalian Aerbin)
11	MF	CHN	Zhang Depeng (Released)
12	GK	CHN	Wang Guoming (loan return to Dalian Shide)
13	MF	CHN	Xie Qingwen (Released)
14	MF	CHN	Hu Xiaowei (Released)
20	MF	CHN	Tang Ge (to Kunming Ruilong)
26	MF	CHN	Chi Jinyu (to Jiangxi Liansheng)
29	MF	CHN	Zhong Hua (Released)

=== Guangdong Sunray Cave ===
In:

No.	Pos.	Nation	Player
2	DF	BRA	Jean Narde (from (Brazil) Vitória)
4	DF	CHN	Guo Zichao (from Guangzhou Evergrande)
5	MF	CRO	Josip Milardović (from (Croatia) NK Slaven Belupo)
10	FW	BRA	Reinaldo (from (Brazil) Bahia)
12	DF	CHN	Fan Qunxiao (from (Hong Kong) TSW Pegasus)
19	FW	CHN	Xiao Yifeng (from Hangzhou Greentown)
23	DF	CHN	Pang Haiming (from Guangdong Youth)
29	DF	CHN	Zhang Yonghai (loan from Beijing Guoan)

Out:

No.	Pos.	Nation	Player
2	DF	CHN	Li Zhihai (to Shenzhen Main Sports)
12	FW	COL	Ricardo Steer (to Harbin Yiteng)
19	DF	CHN	Wang Chao (Released)
23	MF	CHN	Lu Lin (to Guangzhou R&F)
25	MF	CHN	Liu Xi (to Hebei Zhongji)
33	DF	MLI	Mourtala Diakité (Released)

=== Harbin Yiteng ===
In:

No.	Pos.	Nation	Player
4	MF	CHN	Xing Xufei (from Liaoning Whowin)
7	MF	CHN	Li Jiahe (from Shenzhen Ruby)
8	MF	AUS	Adam Hughes (from (Australia) Perth Glory)
10	FW	COL	Ricardo Steer (from Guangdong Sunray Cave)
21	MF	CHN	Bu Xin (from Liaoning Tiger)
30	MF	CHN	Yang Xinxin (Free Agent)
31	FW	BRA	Rodrigo (from (Brazil) Caxias)
32	DF	UKR	Aleksandr Krutskevich (from (Latvia) FK Jūrmala-VV)
33	FW	CHN	Shi Jun (from Shaanxi Daqin)

Out:

No.	Pos.	Nation	Player
7	FW	CHN	Ma Zhiyong (Released)
8	MF	CHN	Wu Dingmao (to Shanxi Jiayi)
10	MF	CHN	Xian Tao (loan to Hebei Zhongji)
15	MF	CHN	Ma Tianming (to Shanxi Jiayi)
20	FW	CHN	Huang Minghua (Released)
21	GK	CHN	Liang Yunfeng (to Hubei China-Kyle)
31	DF	CHN	Wang Xin (Released)
33	MF	CHN	Bu Xin (loan return to Liaoning Tiger)

=== Hohhot Dongjin ===
In:

No.	Pos.	Nation	Player
3	DF	CHN	Li Yi'nan (from Liaoning Whowin)
5	DF	KOR	Song Tae-Lim (from (South Korea) Goyang FC)
8	DF	CHN	Lü Wei (from Tianjin TEDA)
9	MF	KOR	Lee Kil-Hoon (Free Agent)
10	FW	COL	Yovanny Arrechea (loan from Changchun Yatai)
11	MF	CHN	Jiang Xiaoyu (Free Agent)
20	DF	CHN	Huang Zhun (from Qingdao Jonoon)
24	MF	CHN	Li Haoyuan (Free Agent)
25	GK	CHN	Chen Anqi (from Fushun Xinye)
26	DF	CHN	Jiang Hai (Free Agent)
29	DF	CHN	Li Xiang (from Teda Youth)
32	DF	CHN	Mao Kaiyu (from Tianjin TEDA)
35	FW	ARG	Luciano Olguín (from Tianjin TEDA)
36	DF	CHN	He Yichen (from Shenzhen Ruby)

Out:

No.	Pos.	Nation	Player
3	DF	KOR	Lee Yoon-Sub (to (South Korea) Daejeon KHNP)
8	DF	CHN	Lü Wei (loan return to Tianjin TEDA)
9	FW	CRO	Željko Sablić (Released)
10	FW	NGA	Akanni-Sunday Wasiu (Released)
14	MF	CHN	Jia Xiaochen (to Hebei Zhongji)
17	DF	CHN	Liu Huoming (to Hebei Zhongji)
24	DF	CHN	Hao Yonghe (to Liaoning Whowin)
25	DF	CHN	Ming Haohe (to Shaanxi Daqin)
26	FW	CHN	Liu Xi (Released)
27	DF	CHN	Yang Deliang (to Fujian Smart Hero)
30	GK	CHN	Zhang Chen (loan return to Shanghai Shenhua)
32	DF	CHN	Mao Kaiyu (loan return to Tianjin TEDA)

=== Hunan Billows ===
In:

No.	Pos.	Nation	Player
4	DF	CHN	Cao Huan (from Guizhou Renhe)
8	MF	CHN	Lu Jiang (loan from Beijing Guoan)
9	FW	URU	Claudio Cardozo (from (Honduras) Marathón)
11	FW	CHN	Dong Fangzhuo (from (Armenia) FC Mika)
12	DF	HON	Astor Henríquez (from (Honduras) Marathón)
14	MF	CHN	Bai Yuexuan (loan from Tianjin Teda)
15	DF	HON	Erick Norales (from (Honduras) Marathón)
17	GK	CHN	Wang Haoyi (from Chengdu Blades)
19	MF	HON	Emil Martínez (from (Honduras) Marathón)
24	MF	CHN	Wang Lichun (from Guizhou Zhicheng)
26	DF	CHN	Sun Guoliang (Free Agent)
29	FW	CHN	Liu Xinyu (Free Agent)

Out:

No.	Pos.	Nation	Player
1	GK	CHN	Li Jiankun (Released)
2	DF	BRA	William (to Chengdu Blades)
4	DF	CHN	Cao Huan (loan return to Guizhou Renhe)
8	MF	CHN	Xu Deen (Released)
9	DF	CHN	Liu Bo (to Hubei China-Kyle)
10	FW	HON	Jerry Palacios (to (Honduras) Marathón)
11	FW	HON	Mitchel Brown (to (Honduras) Marathón)
12	MF	CHN	Li Yang (to Jiangxi Liansheng)
14	MF	CHN	Hu Hao (to Hubei China-Kyle)
17	MF	CHN	Ge Shengxiang (to Kunming Ruilong)
18	MF	CHN	Zhao Mingxin (Released)
19	MF	HON	Mario Beata (to (Honduras) Marathón)
22	GK	CHN	Dong Jianhong (to Qinghai Senke)
33	DF	CHN	Li Taoyu (to Shaanxi Daqin)
35	DF	CHN	Wang Hengtao (Released)
40	DF	CHN	Li Haiyong (Released)

=== Shanghai Tellace ===
In:

No.	Pos.	Nation	Player
9	FW	COL	Luis Carlos Cabezas (loan from Dalian Aerbin)
10	FW	CHN	Chen Zijie (loan from Shaanxi Renhe)
17	FW	CMR	Didier Njewel (Free Agent)
19	MF	HON	Samir Arzú (loan from (Honduras) C.D. Victoria)
21	MF	CHN	Ding Quancheng (Free Agent)
24	GK	CHN	Mao Rongjun (Free Agent)
25	DF	GHA	Ransford Addo (loan from (Cyprus) AEP Paphos)

Out:

No.	Pos.	Nation	Player
3	DF	CHN	Tang Jiaqi (Released)
5	MF	BEN	Romuald Boco (to (Republic of Ireland) Sligo Rovers)
9	FW	CHN	Wang Yunlong (to Jiangsu Sainty)
10	FW	CHN	Chen Zijie (loan return to Shaanxi Renhe)
24	GK	CHN	Yang Guidong (Retired)
25	MF	CHN	Zhang Yudong (to Shanghai Shenxin)
26	DF	CHN	Aidi (to Dalian Aerbin)
35	FW	CHN	Xu Bin (Released)

=== Shenyang Shenbei ===
In:

No.	Pos.	Nation	Player
5	DF	CRO	Dario Dabac (from Chongqing Lifan)
6	FW	CHN	Wen Huyi (from Shanghai Shenhua)
7	FW	CHN	Liu Chao (from Shenzhen NEO Capital)
8	FW	CHN	Jin Jingdao (from Yanbian Baekdu Tigers)
10	FW	CHN	Chen Xing (from Liaoning Whowin)
11	FW	CHN	Lei Yongchi (from Chengdu Blades)
22	DF	CHN	Tian Yinong (from Fushun Xinye)
24	MF	MNE	Vladimir Vujović (from (Lebanon) Al Ahed)
29	MF	CHN	Li Xingcan (from Tianjin TEDA)
30	FW	CHN	Fan Baiqun (loan from Tianjin TEDA)
31	FW	MAR	Mustapha Allaoui (loan from (France) Guingamp)

Out:

No.	Pos.	Nation	Player
4	DF	COL	Andrés Quejada (Released)
6	MF	CHN	Chen Yongqiang (to Shenzhen Fengpeng)
7	DF	CHN	Cui Zhongkai (loan return to Tianjin TEDA)
8	DF	CHN	Zhao Ming (Released)
10	FW	BRA	Ernandes (Released)
11	FW	CHN	He Tengfei (Released)
13	DF	CHN	Wang Dawang (Released)
15	DF	CHN	Zhang Xu (Released)
21	DF	CHN	Song Can (Released)
23	MF	CHN	Shi Ming (Released)
24	MF	CHN	Shen Bo (Released)
25	DF	CHN	Ding Feng (Released)
29	MF	CHN	Li Xingcan (loan return to Tianjin TEDA)

=== Shenzhen Ruby ===
In:

No.	Pos.	Nation	Player
3	DF	CHN	Zhang Tianlong (from Guangzhou Evergrande)
10	MF	FRA	Benjamin Gavanon (from (France) Amiens SC)
11	MF	CHN	Ding Haifeng (from Beijing Guoan)
12	GK	CHN	Zhang Shichang (from Henan Construction)
14	DF	CHN	Wang Weilong (from Nanchang Hengyuan)
17	MF	TPE	Chen Po-liang (from (Chinese Taipei) Taipower)
27	FW	CHN	Yu Le (from Henan Jianye)
34	FW	CHN	Ling Sihao (from Henan Construction)
37	DF	CHN	Du Longquan (from Fushun Xinye)
38	FW	SEN	Babacar Gueye (from (Germany) Alemannia Aachen)

Out:

No.	Pos.	Nation	Player
3	DF	SVN	Janez Zavrl (Released)
4	DF	CHN	Liu Shuai (loan to Shenzhen Main Sports)
7	MF	GER	Andy Nägelein (Released)
8	MF	CHN	Li Fei (to Chongqing F.C.)
9	FW	NZL	Chris Killen (to Chongqing F.C.)
11	FW	CHN	Liu Chao (to Shenyang Shenbei)
12	GK	CHN	Cheng Yuelei (to Guangzhou R&F)
13	FW	CHN	Zhou Wen (loan to Shenzhen Main Sports)
14	MF	CHN	Li Jiaqi (loan to Shenzhen Main Sports)
16	DF	CHN	Shi Yong (loan to Shenzhen Main Sports)
20	MF	CHN	Abduwali (to Henan Jianye)
21	DF	CHN	Chen Lei (to Dalian Aerbin)
22	DF	CHN	Yuan Lin (to Shenzhen Fengpeng)
27	MF	CHN	Li Jiahe (to Harbin Yiteng)
31	MF	CHN	Zhang Yu (to Qinghai Senke)
32	DF	CHN	Song Chen (to Liaoning Whowin)
35	MF	CHN	Zhang Guofeng (loan to Shenzhen Main Sports)
36	DF	CHN	He Yichen (to Hohhot Dongjin)
38	MF	CHN	Zhao Jian (Released)
40	FW	CHN	Dong Xuesheng (loan return to Shanghai Shenhua)
42	DF	BOL	Ronald Rivero (loan return to (Bolivia) Club Bolívar)

=== Tianjin Songjiang ===
In:

No.	Pos.	Nation	Player
1	GK	CHN	Sui Weijie (from Fushun Xinye)
9	FW	BRA	Anderson (Free Agent)
13	MF	CHN	Ma Xiaopeng (Free Agent)
14	MF	CHN	Ma Yuxiao (Free Agent)
15	MF	CHN	Li Yaoyue (loan from Tianjin Teda)
23	FW	CHN	Wan Cheng (from Chongqing F.C.)
25	MF	CHN	Du Shaobin (from Guizhou Zhicheng)
31	FW	CHN	Liu Weipeng (Free Agent)
32	DF	CHN	Qu Tianbao (from Greentown Youth)
33	DF	KOR	Lee Se-In (from (South Korea) Busan I'Park)
36	DF	CHN	Zhong Beiwei (from Chongqing F.C.)
39	GK	CHN	Shi Meng (Free Agent)

Out:

No.	Pos.	Nation	Player
1	GK	CHN	Chen Haozhuang (Released)
2	DF	CHN	Yao Zhen (to Kunming Ruilong)
15	MF	CHN	Zhang Yong (to Beijing Baxy)
16	MF	CHN	Yu Chennan (to Hubei China-Kyle)
23	DF	CHN	Wang Hao (Released)
24	GK	CHN	Zhang Tong (Released)
25	FW	BRA	Júnior Paulista (to Beijing Baxy)
28	MF	CHN	Li Jichao (Released)
30	FW	SLE	Aluspah Brewah (to (Vietnam) Hanoi T&T F.C.)
32	DF	CHN	Zhang Jian (Released)

=== Wuhan Zall ===
In:

No.	Pos.	Nation	Player
5	MF	CHN	Zhou Heng (from Chongqing Lifan)
6	MF	URU	Julio Gutiérrez (from (Uruguay) Cerro Largo FC)
7	MF	CHN	Luo Yi (from Chongqing Lifan)
9	FW	COL	César Valoyes (from (Colombia) Independiente Medellín)
11	MF	BRA	Adiel (from (Japan) Shonan Bellmare)
12	MF	CHN	Li Gang (from Chengdu Blades)
14	MF	CHN	Hu Xi (from Changchun Yatai)
22	MF	CHN	Du Fa (from Guizhou Renhe)
23	FW	CHN	Tan Si (from Jiangsu Sainty)
28	DF	CHN	Xin Feng (from Shanghai Shenhua)

Out:

No.	Pos.	Nation	Player
4	MF	CHN	Hu Xi (loan return to Changchun Yatai)
5	MF	CRO	Bruno Šiklić (Released)
6	MF	CHN	Zhou Yi (loan to Hubei China-Kyle)
7	DF	CHN	Cai Shun (loan return to Hangzhou Greentown)
8	MF	CHN	Zheng Bin (Retired)
9	FW	SVN	Jože Benko (to (Hungary) Lombard-Pápa TFC)
13	MF	CHN	Jin Xin (loan to Hubei China-Kyle)
14	FW	CHN	Si Jun (Released)
19	FW	CHN	Huang Jie (loan return to Changchun Yatai)
23	DF	CHN	Song Xie (loan to Hubei China-Kyle)
28	FW	CHN	Zhou Liao (to Tianjin TEDA)
32	FW	CHN	Dong Zhiyuan (to Hubei China-Kyle)
33	DF	CHN	Yang Shilin (Released)
35	DF	CHN	Liu Jie (Released)
37	FW	CHN	Qu Shaoyan (to Guizhou Zhicheng)

=== Yanbian Changbai Tiger ===
In:

No.	Pos.	Nation	Player
3	DF	CHN	Han Guanghua (Free Agent)
5	DF	CRO	Stipe Lapić (from (Croatia) NK Zagreb)
11	FW	KOR	Hong Jin-Sub (from (South Korea) Seongnam Ilhwa Chunma)
14	FW	CHN	Li Xun (loan return from Beijing Technology)
17	DF	CHN	Yu Hang (from Changchun Yatai)
19	MF	CHN	Han Songfeng (from Qingdao QUST)
20	FW	BRA	Ronaille Calheira (from (Bolivia) The Strongest La Paz)
27	FW	CHN	Piao Wanzhe (Free Agent)
32	DF	CHN	Yao Bo (loan from Dalian Shide)

Out:

No.	Pos.	Nation	Player
5	DF	CHN	Han Qingsong (to Chongqing Lifan)
10	FW	CHN	Jin Jingdao (to Shenyang Shenbei)
14	MF	CHN	Jin Long (Released)
17	MF	CHN	Li Jun (to Beijing Baxy)
21	DF	KOR	Woo Choo-Young (Released)
27	MF	CHN	Nan Longfan (Released)
28	MF	GHA	Daniel Quaye (to Beijing Baxy)
35	FW	KOR	Park Jong-Woo (Released)
39	FW	CHN	Yu Feng (Released)
40	MF	CHN	Yan Haotian (Released)
