= Wu Yansheng =

Chinese footballer

Wu Yansheng 吴彦晟
Personal information
- Full name: Wu Yansheng
- Date of birth: May 3, 1984 (age 42)
- Place of birth: Shanghai, China
- Height: 1.87 m (6 ft 1 1/2 in)
- Position: Goalkeeper

Youth career
- Shanghai Wanshen
- 2001–2003: Shanghai COSCO Huili

Senior career*
Years	Team	Apps	(Gls)
2004–2010	Shaanxi Renhe	92	(0)
2012–2015	Shanghai Shenxin	0	(0)
2016–2018	Yinchuan Helanshan	46	(0)
- * Club domestic league appearances and goals as of 13 October 2018

Wu Yansheng (Chinese: 吴彦晟; pinyin: Wú Yànshèng; born 3 May 1984 in Shanghai) is a Chinese football player.

== Club career ==
Wu started his football career in 2004 when he was promoted to Chinese Super League club Inter Shanghai's first team squad. On 7 September 2005, he made his senior debut in the second leg of 2005 Chinese FA Cup quarter-finals against Shandong Luneng Taishan after first choice goalkeeper Zhang Chen got ill before the match. His Super League debut came on 5 November 2005, in the last match of the season which Inter Shanghai lost to Chongqing Lifan 3–1. Wu gained more chances after the club was relocated to Shaanxi in 2006. He became the first choice of the club in 2007 after Zhang Chen transferred to Shanghai Shenhua. He lost his position to Shen Jun when Zhu Guanghu became the manager of the club in 2010. He was dropped off in the 2011 after Zhang Lie joined Shaanxi.

Wu was signed by another Super League club Shanghai Shenxin in 2012. On 26 June 2012, he made his debut for Shanghai Shenxin in the third round of 2012 Chinese FA Cup, which Shanghai Shenxin was defeated by China League One club Shenyang Shenbei in the penalty shootout.

In March 2016, Wu transferred to China League Two side Yinchuan Helanshan.

== Career statistics ==
Statistics accurate as of match played 13 October 2018.

Club performance			League		Cup		League Cup		Continental		Total	
Season	Club	League	Apps	Goals	Apps	Goals	Apps	Goals	Apps	Goals	Apps	Goals
China PR			League		FA Cup		CSL Cup		Asia		Total	
2004	Shaanxi Renhe	Chinese Super League	0	0	0	0	0	0	-		0	0
2005	Shaanxi Renhe	Chinese Super League	1	0	1	0	0	0	-		2	0
2006	Shaanxi Renhe	Chinese Super League	5	0	0	0	-		-		5	0
2007	Shaanxi Renhe	Chinese Super League	27	0	-		-		-		27	0
2008	Shaanxi Renhe	Chinese Super League	30	0	-		-		-		30	0
2009	Shaanxi Renhe	Chinese Super League	26	0	-		-		-		26	0
2010	Shaanxi Renhe	Chinese Super League	3	0	-		-		-		3	0
2012	Shanghai Shenxin	Chinese Super League	0	0	1	0	-		-		1	0
2013	Shanghai Shenxin	Chinese Super League	0	0	0	0	-		-		0	0
2014	Shanghai Shenxin	Chinese Super League	0	0	2	0	-		-		2	0
2015	Shanghai Shenxin	Chinese Super League	0	0	0	0	-		-		0	0
2016	Yinchuan Helanshan	China League Two	20	0	1	0	-		-		21	0
2017	Yinchuan Helanshan	China League Two	14	0	2	0	-		-		16	0
2018	Yinchuan Helanshan	China League Two	12	0	3	0	-		-		15	0
Total	China PR		138	0	10	0	0	0	0	0	148	0
