= Hao Yonghe =

Chinese footballer (born 1989)

Hao Yonghe 郝永赫
Personal information
- Date of birth: December 29, 1989 (age 36)
- Place of birth: Shenyang, Liaoning, China
- Height: 1.78 m (5 ft 10 in)
- Position: Midfielder

Senior career*
Years	Team	Apps	(Gls)
2010–2011	Shenyang Dongjin	17	(3)
2012–2014	Liaoning Whowin	3	(0)
2014	→ Shenyang Zhongze (loan)	0	(0)
- * Club domestic league appearances and goals as of 4 November 2013

Hao Yonghe (Chinese: 郝永赫; born 29 December 1989) is a Chinese football player.

== Club career ==
In 2010, Hao Yonghe started his professional footballer career with Shenyang Dongjin in the China League One.

On 23 February 2012, Hao transferred to Chinese Super League side Liaoning Whowin.

He would eventually make his league debut for Liaoning on 14 July 2013 in a game against Tianjin Teda, coming on as a substitute for Wu Gaojun in the 64th minute.

On 23 January 2013, Hao moved to China League One side Shenyang Zhongze on a one-year loan deal.

== Club career statistics ==
Club performance			League		Cup		League Cup		Continental		Total	
Season	Club	League	Apps	Goals	Apps	Goals	Apps	Goals	Apps	Goals	Apps	Goals
China PR			League		FA Cup		CSL Cup		Asia		Total	
2010	Shenyang Dongjin	China League One	4	0	-		-		-		4	0
2011	Shenyang Dongjin	China League One	13	3	1	0	-		-		14	3
2012	Liaoning Whowin	Chinese Super League	0	0	0	0	-		-		0	0
2013	Liaoning Whowin	Chinese Super League	3	0	0	0	-		-		3	0
2014	Shenyang Zhongze	China League One	0	0	0	0	-		-		0	0
Total	China PR		20	3	1	0	0	0	0	0	21	3

Statistics accurate as of match played 4 November 2013
