= Liu Chao =

Liu Chao may refer to:

- Six Dynasties, a collective noun for six Chinese dynasties
- Liu Chao (footballer), Chinese footballer
