= Lu Wei =

Lu Wei may refer to:

== People ==
- Lu Wei (politician) (born 1960), Chinese politician
- Lu Wei (film maker) (born 1950), Chinese composer and director, winner of Golden Rooster Award for Best Directorial Debut
- Lü Wei (footballer) (born 1989), Chinese footballer
- Lü Wei (racing driver) (born 1986), Chinese-Canadian racing driver
- Lü Wei (softball) (born 1983), Chinese softball player
- Lü Wei (diver) (1966–1990), Chinese diver
- Lu Wei (diver) (born 2005), Chinese diver
- Lu Wei (scientist), analytical chemist at Caltech, winner of a 2018 Blavatnik Award

== Food ==
- Lou mei, a dish also known as lu wei
