= Zhang Chen =

Zhang Chen may refer to:

- Zhang Chen (footballer)
- Zhang Chen (volleyball)
- Zhang Chen (politician), Minister of Nuclear Industry of the People's Republic of China.
