= Lü Wei =

Lü Wei may refer to:

- Lü Wei (diver) (1966–1990), Chinese diver
- Lü Wei (racing driver) (born 1986), Chinese-Canadian racing driver
- Lü Wei (footballer) (born 1989), Chinese male footballer
- Lü Wei (softball) (born 1983), Chinese female softball player
