= Mao Kaiyu =

Chinese association football player

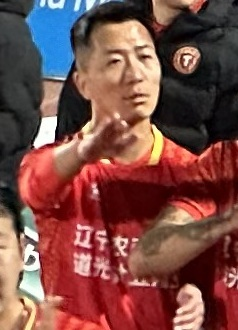
- Mao Kaiyu in April 2025

Personal information
- Date of birth: 10 January 1991 (age 35)
- Place of birth: Shenyang, Liaoning, China
- Height: 1.83 m (6 ft 0 in)
- Position: Centre-back

Senior career*
Years	Team	Apps	(Gls)
2012–2014	Tianjin TEDA	0	(0)
2012	→ Shenyang Dongjin (loan)	33	(1)
2013	→ Shenyang Shenbei (loan)	3	(0)
2014	→ Yinchuan Helanshan (loan)	?	(?)
2015–2017	Inner Mongolia Zhongyou	52	(4)
2018–2020	Heilongjiang Ice City	66	(5)
2021–2022	Changchun Yatai	16	(0)
2023–2025	Liaoning Tieren	23	(0)
- * Club domestic league appearances and goals as of 14:01, 15 October 2022 (UTC)

Mao Kaiyu (Chinese: 毛开宇; born 10 January 1991) is a Chinese retired footballer who played as a centre-back.

== Career statistics ==
=== Club ===
As of 15 October 2022.

Club	Season	League			Cup		Continental		Other		Total	
Club	Season	Division	Apps	Goals	Apps	Goals	Apps	Goals	Apps	Goals	Apps	Goals
Tianjin TEDA	2011	Chinese Super League	0	0	0	0	–		0	0	0	0
Tianjin TEDA	2012	Chinese Super League	0	0	0	0	–		0	0	0	0
Tianjin TEDA	2013	Chinese Super League	0	0	0	0	–		0	0	0	0
Tianjin TEDA	2014	Chinese Super League	0	0	0	0	–		0	0	0	0
Tianjin TEDA	Total		0	0	0	0	0	0	0	0	0	0
Shenyang Dongjin (loan)	2011	China League One	11	0	0	0	–		0	0	11	0
Shenyang Dongjin (loan)	2012	China League One	22	1	1 (Note: Appearances in the Chinese FA Cup)	0	–		0	0	23	1
Shenyang Dongjin (loan)	Total		33	1	1	0	0	0	0	0	34	1
Shenyang Shenbei (loan)	2013	China League One	3	0	2	0	–		0	0	5	0
Yinchuan Helanshan (loan)	2014	China League Two	?	?	0	0	–		0	0	?	?
Inner Mongolia Zhongyou	2015	China League One	14	0	0	0	–		0	0	14	0
Inner Mongolia Zhongyou	2016	China League One	27	4	2	0	–		0	0	29	4
Inner Mongolia Zhongyou	2017	China League One	11	0	0	0	–		0	0	11	0
Inner Mongolia Zhongyou	Total		52	4	2	0	0	0	0	0	56	4
Heilongjiang Ice City	2018	China League One	27	1	0	0	–		0	0	27	1
Heilongjiang Ice City	2019	China League One	24	3	0	0	–		0	0	24	3
Heilongjiang Ice City	2020	China League One	15	1	0	0	–		2 (Note: Appearances in the China League One playoffs)	1	17	2
Heilongjiang Ice City	Total		66	5	0	0	0	0	0	0	68	6
Changchun Yatai	2021	Chinese Super League	9	0	2	0	–		0	0	11	0
Changchun Yatai	2022	Chinese Super League	7	0	0	0	–		0	0	7	0
Changchun Yatai	Total		16	0	2	0	0	0	0	0	18	0
Career total			170	10	7	0	0	0	2	1	179	11

== Honours ==
Liaoning Tieren

- China League One: 2025
