= Wang Peng (footballer, born 1993) =

Chinese footballer

Wang Peng 王鹏
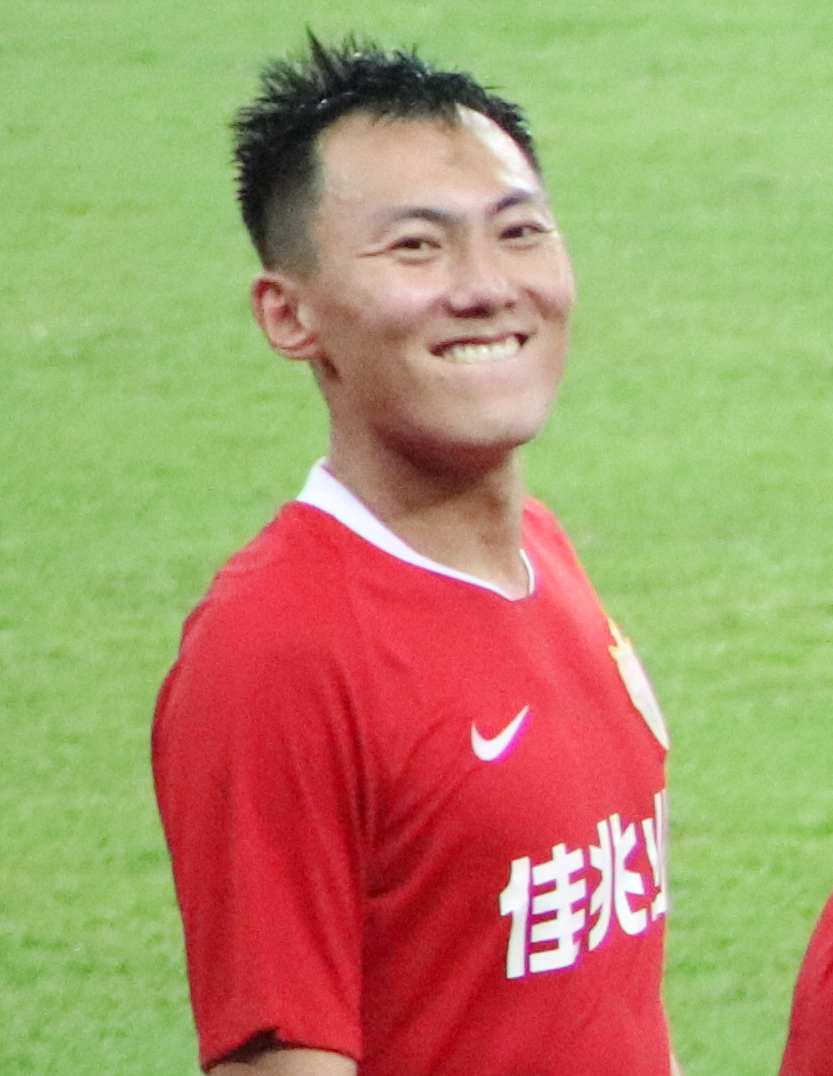

Personal information
- Full name: Wang Peng
- Date of birth: 24 January 1993 (age 33)
- Place of birth: Fushun, Liaoning, China
- Height: 1.85 m (6 ft 1 in)
- Position: Defender

Team information
- Current team: Qingdao West Coast
- Number: 15

Youth career
- Beijing Sangao
- 2013: Dalian Aerbin

Senior career*
Years	Team	Apps	(Gls)
2012	Beijing Sangao	22	(1)
2014–2018	Shijiazhuang Ever Bright	86	(4)
2019–2022	Shenzhen FC	24	(0)
2020	→ Shijiazhuang Ever Bright (loan)	16	(1)
2021	→ Changchun Yatai (loan)	12	(1)
2022	→ Cangzhou Mighty Lions (loan)	15	(0)
2023–2024	Cangzhou Mighty Lions	23	(4)
2025–	Qingdao West Coast	40	(0)
- * Club domestic league appearances and goals as of 19 November 2026

Wang Peng (Chinese: 王鹏; born 24 January 1993 in Fushun) is a Chinese professional footballer who plays as a defender for Chinese Super League club Qingdao West Coast.

== Club career ==
Wang Peng started his professional football career in 2012 when he joined Beijing Sangao for the 2012 China League Two campaign. He moved to China League One club Shijiazhuang Ever Bright in January 2014. He would be part of the squad that would gain promotion to the top tier at the end of the 2014 China League One campaign. On 5 April 2015, he made his Super League debut in a 2–1 defeat against Jiangsu Sainty, coming on as a substitute for Hu Wei in the 82nd minute. On 30 October 2016, Wang was suspended for half-year by China Anti-Doping Agency due to a positive sample test for hydrochlorothiazide. This would hurt the club as they were relegated at the end of the 2016 Chinese Super League campaign. On 10 March 2018, Wang scored his first goal for the club in a 2–1 home win over Meizhou Hakka. He scored four goals in 28 appearances in the 2018 season.

On 10 February 2019, Wang transferred to Super League newcomer Shenzhen. He would go on to make his debut for Shenzhen in a league game against Hebei China Fortune F.C. on 2 March 2019 in a 3-1 victory. Despite going on to make 24 league appearances, the club only survived relegation because Tianjin Tianhai F.C. dissolved. On 20 January 2020, Wang would be loaned back to Shijiazhuang Ever Bright for the 2020 Chinese Super League campaign. He would make his return debut in a league game on 26 July 2020 against Hebei China Fortune F.C. where he also scored in a 2-2 draw.

After returning to Cangzhou Mighty Lions (formerly named Shijiazhuang Everbright) on loan for the 2022 season, Wang joined Cangzhou permanently on a free transfer in March 2023.

== Career statistics ==
Statistics accurate as of match played 31 December 2022.

Appearances and goals by club, season and competition
Club	Season	League			National Cup		Continental		Other		Total	
Club	Season	Division	Apps	Goals	Apps	Goals	Apps	Goals	Apps	Goals	Apps	Goals
Beijing Sangao	2012	China League Two	22	1	-		-		-		22	1
Shijiazhuang Ever Bright	2014	China League One	1	0	1	0	-		-		2	0
Shijiazhuang Ever Bright	2015	Chinese Super League	18	0	1	0	-		-		19	0
Shijiazhuang Ever Bright	2016	Chinese Super League	16	0	1	0	-		-		17	0
Shijiazhuang Ever Bright	2017	China League One	23	0	0	0	-		-		23	0
Shijiazhuang Ever Bright	2018	China League One	28	4	0	0	-		-		28	4
Shijiazhuang Ever Bright	Total		86	4	3	0	0	0	0	0	89	4
Shenzhen	2019	Chinese Super League	24	0	1	0	-		-		25	0
Shijiazhuang Ever Bright (loan)	2020	Chinese Super League	16	1	0	0	-		-		16	1
Changchun Yatai (loan)	2021	Chinese Super League	12	1	1	0	-		-		13	1
Cangzhou Mighty Lions (loan)	2022	Chinese Super League	15	0	0	0	-		-		15	0
Career total			175	7	5	0	0	0	0	0	180	7
