= Li Xingcan =

Chinese footballer

Li Xingcan 李星灿
Personal information
- Date of birth: July 23, 1986 (age 40)
- Place of birth: Tianjin, China
- Height: 1.78 m (5 ft 10 in)
- Position: Midfielder

Team information
- Current team: Hangzhou Wuyue Qiantang
- Number: 10

Youth career
- Tianjin TEDA

Senior career*
Years	Team	Apps	(Gls)
2006–2011	Tianjin TEDA	18	(0)
2011	→ Tianjin Runyulong (loan)	25	(9)
2012–2013	Shenyang Shenbei	43	(12)
2014–2017	Tianjin Quanjian	95	(6)
2018–	Zhejiang Greentown	6	(1)
2019	→ Hangzhou Wuyue Qiantang (loan)	25	(10)
- * Club domestic league appearances and goals as of 12 October 2019

Li Xingcan (Chinese: 李星灿; born 23 July 1986 in Tianjin) is a Chinese football player who currently plays for Zibo Qisheng in the CMCL.

== Club career ==
In 2006, Li Xingcan started his professional footballer career with Tianjin TEDA in the Chinese Super League. He would eventually make his league debut for Tianjin on 10 March 2007 in a game against Shenzhen Ruby, coming on as a substitute for Chi Rongliang in the 82nd minute. In February 2011, Li was loaned to China League One side Tianjin Runyulong until 31 December. On 31 December 2011, Li transferred to China League One side Shenyang Shenbei. He moved to fellow League One side Tianjin Songjiang in February 2014.

On 4 February 2018, Li transferred to China League One side Zhejiang Greentown. On 2 March 2019, Li was loaned to League Two side Hangzhou Wuyue Qiantang for the 2019 season.

== Club career statistics ==
Statistics accurate as of match played 12 October 2019.

Club performance			League		Cup		League Cup		Continental		Total	
Season	Club	League	Apps	Goals	Apps	Goals	Apps	Goals	Apps	Goals	Apps	Goals
China PR			League		FA Cup		CSL Cup		Asia		Total	
2006	Tianjin TEDA	Chinese Super League	0	0	0	0	-		-		0	0
2007	Tianjin TEDA	Chinese Super League	12	0	-		-		-		12	0
2008	Tianjin TEDA	Chinese Super League	3	0	-		-		-		3	0
2009	Tianjin TEDA	Chinese Super League	0	0	-		-		0	0	0	0
2010	Tianjin TEDA	Chinese Super League	3	0	-		-		-		3	0
2011	Tianjin Runyulong	China League One	25	9	1	0	-		-		26	9
2012	Shenyang Shenbei	China League One	24	8	1	0	-		-		25	8
2013	Shenyang Shenbei	China League One	19	4	1	0	-		-		20	4
2014	Tianjin Quanjian	China League One	29	3	0	0	-		-		29	3
2015	Tianjin Quanjian	China League One	29	2	0	0	-		-		29	2
2016	Tianjin Quanjian	China League One	18	0	5	1	-		-		23	1
2017	Tianjin Quanjian	Chinese Super League	19	1	1	0	-		-		20	1
2018	Zhejiang Greentown	China League One	6	1	1	0	-		-		7	1
2019	Hangzhou Wuyue Qiantang	China League Two	25	10	1	2	-		-		26	12
Total	China PR		212	38	11	3	0	0	0	0	223	41

== Honours ==
=== Club ===
Tianjin Quanjian

- China League One: 2016
