= Luo Yi (footballer) =

Chinese footballer (born 1987)

Luo Yi 罗毅
Personal information
- Date of birth: June 24, 1987 (age 39)
- Place of birth: Wuhan, Hubei, China
- Height: 1.74 m (5 ft 8 1/2 in)
- Positions: Winger; full-back

Youth career
- Wuhan Huanghelou

Senior career*
Years	Team	Apps	(Gls)
2008	Wuhan Huanghelou	0	(0)
2009–2011	Chongqing Lifan	37	(1)
2012–2022	Wuhan Yangtze River	153	(11)
- * Club domestic league appearances and goals as of 31 December 2020

Luo Yi (Chinese: 罗毅; born 24 June 1987 in Wuhan) is a Chinese football coach and former professional football player who played as a winger or full-back.

== Club career ==
In 2008, Luo Yi started his professional footballer career with Wuhan Huanghelou in the Chinese Super League after he was promoted from their youth team. On 27 February 2009, Luo transferred to another Chinese Super League side in Chongqing Lifan. He would make his league debut for Chongqing on 22 March 2009 in a game against Beijing Guoan, coming on as a substitute for Hu Wei in the 75th minute in a game that ended in a 3-1 defeat. After the game Luo would gradually establish himself as regular within the squad, however he was part of the team that was relegated at the end of the 2010 Chinese Super League season.

On 3 January 2012, Luo returned to his hometown to join China League One side Wuhan Zall on a free transfer. He would make his debut for the club on 17 March 2012 in a league game against Harbin Yiteng that ended in a 0-0 draw. Throughout the season Luo would be an integral member of the squad that came runners-up within the division and gain promotion to the top tier. After only one season within the top flight the club were relegated at the end of the 2013 Chinese Super League season. Luo would remain an integral member of the squad until the club eventually won promotion again by winning the 2018 China League One division.

== Career statistics ==
Statistics accurate as of match played 31 December 2020.

Appearances and goals by club, season and competition
Club	Season	League			National Cup		Continental		Other		Total	
Club	Season	Division	Apps	Goals	Apps	Goals	Apps	Goals	Apps	Goals	Apps	Goals
Wuhan Huanghelou	2008	Chinese Super League	0	0	-		-		-		0	0
Chongqing Lifan	2009	Chinese Super League	11	0	-		-		-		11	0
Chongqing Lifan	2010	Chinese Super League	6	0	-		-		-		6	0
Chongqing Lifan	2011	China League One	20	1	0	0	-		-		20	1
Chongqing Lifan	Total		37	1	0	0	0	0	0	0	37	1
Wuhan Zall	2012	China League One	25	6	1	0	-		-		26	6
Wuhan Zall	2013	Chinese Super League	18	1	1	0	-		-		19	1
Wuhan Zall	2014	China League One	19	1	0	0	-		-		19	1
Wuhan Zall	2015	China League One	24	0	0	0	-		-		24	0
Wuhan Zall	2016	China League One	21	1	0	0	-		-		21	1
Wuhan Zall	2017	China League One	25	0	1	0	-		-		26	0
Wuhan Zall	2018	China League One	20	2	0	0	-		-		20	2
Wuhan Zall	2019	Chinese Super League	1	0	0	0	-		-		1	0
Wuhan Zall	2020	Chinese Super League	0	0	5	0	-		0 (Note: Appearance(s) in CSL Relegation play-offs)	0	5	0
Wuhan Zall	Total		153	11	8	0	0	0	0	0	161	11
Career total			190	12	8	0	0	0	0	0	198	12

== Honours ==
=== Club ===
Wuhan Zall

- China League One: 2018
