= Li Xiang (footballer) =

Chinese association football player

Personal information
- Date of birth: 17 January 1991 (age 35)
- Height: 1.87 m (6 ft 2 in)
- Position: Forward

Team information
- Current team: Tianjin Jinmen Tiger
- Number: 16

Youth career
- Tianjin TEDA
- –2012: Shenyang Dongjin

Senior career*
Years	Team	Apps	(Gls)
2012–2013	Shenyang Dongjin		
2014	Beijing IT	18	(7)
2015–2017	Hunan Billows	49	(10)
2017–2020	Beijing BSU	37	(3)
2020–2021	Shaoxing Keqiao Yuejia	5	(1)
2021–	Tianjin Jinmen Tiger	1	(0)
- * Club domestic league appearances and goals as of 14:01, 23 April 2021 (UTC)

Li Xiang (Chinese: 李想; born 17 January 1991) is a Chinese footballer currently playing as a forward for Tianjin Jinmen Tiger.

== Career statistics ==
=== Club ===
As of 23 April 2021.

Club	Season	League			Cup		Continental		Other		Total	
Club	Season	Division	Apps	Goals	Apps	Goals	Apps	Goals	Apps	Goals	Apps	Goals
Shenyang Dongjin	2012	China League One	1	0	0	0	–		0	0	1	0
Shenyang Dongjin	2013	China League Two	–		2 (Note: Appearances in the Chinese FA Cup)	0	–		0	0	2	0
Shenyang Dongjin	Total		1	0	2	0	0	0	0	0	3	0
Beijing IT	2014	China League One	18	7	1	1	–		0	0	19	8
Hunan Billows	2015	China League One	27	8	0	0	–		0	0	27	8
Hunan Billows	2016	China League One	22	2	0	0	–		0	0	2	0
Hunan Billows	Total		49	10	0	0	0	0	0	0	49	10
Beijing BSU	2017	China League One	20	2	1	0	–		0	0	21	2
Beijing BSU	2018	China League One	2	0	1	0	–		0	0	3	0
Beijing BSU	2019	China League One	15	1	2	0	–		0	0	17	1
Beijing BSU	Total		37	3	0	0	0	0	0	0	49	10
Shaoxing Keqiao Yuejia	2020	China League Two	5	1	0	0	–		0	0	5	1
Tianjin Jinmen Tiger	2021	Chinese Super League	1	0	0	0	–		0	0	1	0
Career total			1	0	0	0	0	0	0	0	1	0
