= Xu Qing (footballer) =

Chinese association football player

Personal information
- Date of birth: 11 March 1987 (age 39)
- Place of birth: Wuhan, Hubei, China
- Height: 1.80 m (5 ft 11 in)
- Position: Right-back

Senior career*
Years	Team	Apps	(Gls)
2005–2007	Wuhan Optics Valley	8	(0)
2008–2009	Chengdu Blades	0	(0)
2008	→ Sheffield United (Hong Kong) (loan)	9	(1)
2009	→ Shaanxi Baorong Chanba (loan)	9	(1)
2010–2011	Shaanxi Baorong Chanba	9	(0)
2012–2013	Chongqing	37	(0)
2014–2018	Xinjiang Tianshan Leopard	130	(8)
2019–2020	Inner Mongolia Zhongyou	33	(0)
2021–2022	Wuhan Three Towns	4	(0)
- * Club domestic league appearances and goals as of 14:01, 31 January 2023 (UTC)

Xu Qing (Chinese: 徐擎; born 11 March 1987) is a Chinese footballer who plays as a right-back.

== Club career ==
Xu Qing started his football career in the 2005 league season playing for Wuhan Optics Valley where he made eight appearances in his debut season. He would be a squad player for Wuhan until they were controversially relegated then subsequently disbanded during the 2008 season after the club's management did not accept the punishment given to them by the Chinese Football Association after a scuffle broke out during a match against Beijing Guoan on 27 September 2008.

He would join another top tier club in Chengdu Blades, however he struggled to gain any playing time and was loaned out to their satellite team Sheffield United (Hong Kong) and then Shaanxi Baorong Chanba. His time at Shaanxi would become permanent on 4 January 2010. After three seasons in the top tier with Shaanxi where he struggled to establish himself as a vital member of their team he joined second tier club Chongqing on 24 February 2012 to revive his career. At Chongqing he would establish himself as a vital member of their team until the club were relegated at the end of 2013 China League One season and he was free to leave the club.

Xu Qing joined another second tier club in Xinjiang Tianshan Leopard where for the next five season as he became a vital member of their team until he joined Inner Mongolia Zhongyou. In the 2021 China League One campaign he joined Wuhan Three Towns and in his first season with the club he would go on to aid them in winning the division title and promotion into the top tier for the first tine in their history.

== Career statistics ==
As of 31 January 2023.

Club	Season	League			Cup		Other		Total	
Club	Season	Division	Apps	Goals	Apps	Goals	Apps	Goals	Apps	Goals
Wuhan Optics Valley	2005	Chinese Super League	8	0	0	0	–		8	0
Wuhan Optics Valley	2006	Chinese Super League	0	0	0	0	–		0	0
Wuhan Optics Valley	2007	Chinese Super League	0	0	0	0	–		0	0
Wuhan Optics Valley	Total		8	0	0	0	0	0	8	0
Chengdu Blades	2008	Chinese Super League	0	0	0	0	–		0	0
Chengdu Blades	2009	Chinese Super League	0	0	0	0	–		0	0
Chengdu Blades	Total		0	0	0	0	0	0	0	0
Sheffield United (Hong Kong) (loan)	2008–09	Hong Kong First Division	9	1	0	0	1 (Note: Appearances in the Hong Kong Senior Challenge Shield)	0	10	1
Shaanxi Baorong Chanba (loan)	2009	Chinese Super League	9	1	0	0	–		9	1
Shaanxi Baorong Chanba	2010	Chinese Super League	7	0	0	0	–		7	0
Shaanxi Baorong Chanba	2011	Chinese Super League	2	0	0	0	–		2	0
Shaanxi Baorong Chanba	Total		18	1	0	0	0	0	18	1
Chongqing	2012	China League One	13	0	0	0	–		13	0
Chongqing	2013	China League One	24	0	1	0	–		25	0
Chongqing	Total		37	0	1	0	0	0	38	0
Xinjiang Tianshan Leopard	2014	China League One	18	3	0	0	–		18	3
Xinjiang Tianshan Leopard	2015	China League One	29	0	3	0	–		32	0
Xinjiang Tianshan Leopard	2016	China League One	27	3	2	0	–		29	3
Xinjiang Tianshan Leopard	2017	China League One	28	1	0	0	–		28	1
Xinjiang Tianshan Leopard	2018	China League One	28	1	0	0	–		28	1
Xinjiang Tianshan Leopard	Total		130	8	5	0	0	0	135	8
Inner Mongolia Zhongyou	2019	China League One	22	0	0	0	–		22	0
Inner Mongolia Zhongyou	2020	China League One	11	0	0	0	–		11	0
Inner Mongolia Zhongyou	Total		33	0	0	0	0	0	33	0
Wuhan Three Towns	2021	China League One	4	0	1	0	–		5	0
Career total			239	10	7	0	1	0	247	10

== Honours ==
=== Club ===
Wuhan Three Towns

- China League One: 2021
