= Su Jingyu =

Chinese footballer

Su Jingyu 苏镜宇
Personal information
- Date of birth: February 4, 1987 (age 39)
- Place of birth: Zhangjiakou, China
- Height: 1.80 m (5 ft 11 in)
- Position: Striker

Youth career
- Shanghai Shenhua

Senior career*
Years	Team	Apps	(Gls)
2007–2011	Henan Jianye	18	(1)
2012	Hebei Zhongji	21	(2)
2013–2014	Guangdong Sunray Cave	9	(0)
2016	Shijiazhuang Ever Bright	0	(0)

Managerial career
- 2020-2022: Cangzhou Mighty Lions (assistant)
- 2025: Shijiazhuang Gongfu (assistant)
- * Club domestic league appearances and goals as of 12 November 2014

Su Jingyu (Chinese: 苏镜宇; born February 4, 1987) is a Chinese football coach and former footballer who played as a striker.

== Club career ==
Su Jingyu originally began his football career playing for the Shanghai Shenhua youth team, however he would begin his professional football career when he joined Henan Construction during the 2007 league season. He would have to wait until the 2008 Chinese Super League season before he would make his league debut coming on as a late substitute against Shandong Luneng on November 12, 2008 in a 1-0 defeat. Gradually establishing himself within the team throughout the rest of the 2008 and 2009 league season Su Jingyu would eventually score his first goal against Changsha Ginde on August 30, 2009 in a 3-0 win.

Su joined China League One team Guangdong Sunray Cave in February 2013.

On 29 January 2026, Su was given a lifetime ban for match-fixing by the Chinese Football Association.
