= Shenyang Olympic Sports Centre Stadium =

Sports venue in Shenyang, China

Shenyang Olympic Sports Centre Stadium 沈阳奥林匹克体育中心
- Crystal Crown
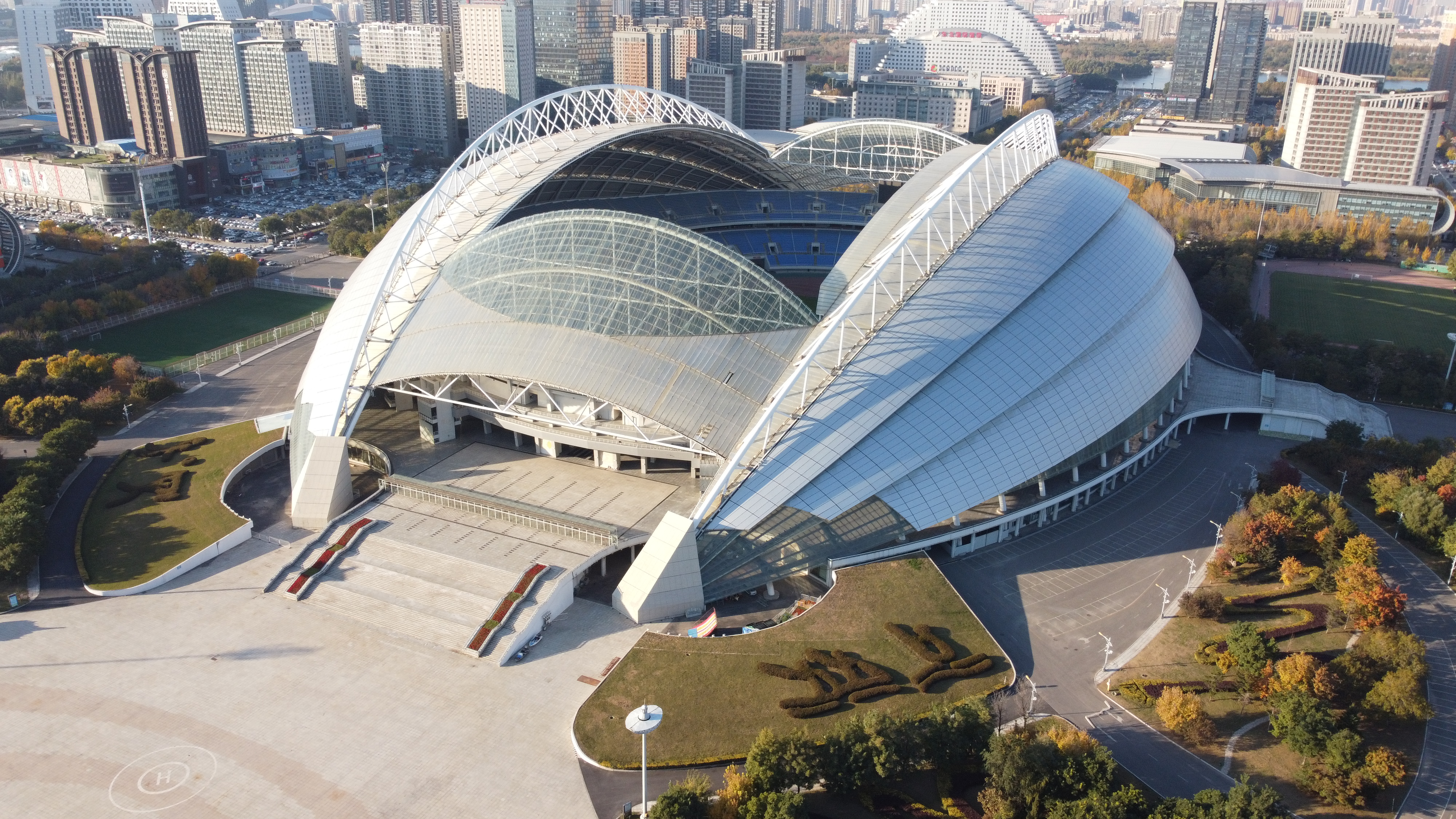
- Interactive map of Shenyang Olympic Sports Centre Stadium 沈阳奥林匹克体育中心
- Address: 30 Hunnan Middle Road; Shenyang; China
- Location: Shenyang, Liaoning, China
- Coordinates: 41.739037°N 123.457484°E
- Capacity: 60,000

Construction
- Opened: 2007
- Architect: AXS Satow

Tenants
- Shenyang Dongjin (2008–2011, 2014–2018); Liaoning Whowin (2016–2017); Liaoning Tieren (2024–present)

The Shenyang Olympic Sports Centre Stadium (simplified Chinese: 沈阳奥林匹克体育中心; traditional Chinese: 瀋陽奧林匹克體育中心; pinyin: Shěnyáng Àolínpǐkè Tǐyù Zhōngxīn) is a 60,000-seat multi-purpose stadium in Shenyang, Liaoning, China. It is part of the Shenyang Olympic Sports Centre.

Nicknamed "Crystal Crown" 水晶皇冠, the stadium was built by AXS Satow as a replacement for Wulihe Stadium. It hosted football matches at the 2008 Summer Olympics. It was the home ground of the Shenyang Dongjin, a club that folded in 2018. In 2013 the stadium was the principal venue of the 2013 National Games of China with the opening and closing ceremonies as well as the main athletic events.

The complex includes a 10,000-seat gymnasium, a 4,000-seat natatorium, and a 4,000-seat tennis field.

== 2008 Olympic Football Matches ==
| Date | Time (UTC+08) | Team #1 | Result | Team #2 | Round | Attendance |
|---|---|---|---|---|---|---|
| 6 August 2008 | 17:00 | Germany | 0-0 | Brazil | Group F | 20,703 |
| 6 August 2008 | 19:45 | North Korea | 1-0 | Nigeria | Group F | 24,084 |
| 7 August 2008 | 17:00 | Brazil | 1-0 | Belgium | Group C | 39,661 |
| 7 August 2008 | 19:45 | China | 1-1 | New Zealand | Group C | 41,407 |
| 9 August 2008 | 17:00 | Nigeria | 0-1 | Germany | Group F | 19,266 |
| 9 August 2008 | 19:45 | Brazil | 2-1 | North Korea | Group F | 19,616 |
| 10 August 2008 | 17:00 | New Zealand | 0-5 | Brazil | Group C | 44,951 |
| 10 August 2008 | 19:45 | Belgium | 2-0 | China | Group C | 45,756 |
| 13 August 2008 | 17:00 | Netherlands | 1-0 | Japan | Group B | 38,790 |
| 15 August 2008 | 21:00 | Sweden | 0-2 | Germany | Quarter Finals (Women) | 17,209 |
| 16 August 2008 | 18:00 | Brazil | 2-0 (a.e.t) | Cameroon | Quarter Finals (Men) | 41,043 |

== See also ==
- List of football stadiums in China
- List of stadiums in China
- Lists of stadiums
