= Cui Zhongkai =

Chinese association football player

Personal information
- Date of birth: 19 May 1989 (age 37)
- Place of birth: Dalian, Liaoning, China
- Height: 1.83 m (6 ft 0 in)
- Position: Right-back

Team information
- Current team: Dalian Zhixing

Youth career
- Tianjin TEDA

Senior career*
Years	Team	Apps	(Gls)
2012–2019	Beijing BSU	102	(4)
2020–2021	Xi'an Wolves	11	(0)
2021–2022	Beijing BSU	16	(0)
2022–	Dalian Zhixing	0	(0)
- * Club domestic league appearances and goals as of 14:01, 26 April 2022 (UTC)

Cui Zhongkai (simplified Chinese: 崔仲凯; traditional Chinese: 崔仲凱; pinyin: Cuī Zhòngkǎi; born 19 May 1989) is a Chinese footballer currently playing as a right-back for Dalian Zhixing.

== Career statistics ==
=== Club ===
As of 24 August 2021.

Club	Season	League			Cup		Other		Total	
Club	Season	Division	Apps	Goals	Apps	Goals	Apps	Goals	Apps	Goals
Beijing BSU	2012	China League One	1	0	0	0	0	0	1	0
Beijing BSU	2013	China League One	0	0	1 (Note: Appearances in the Chinese FA Cup)	0	0	0	1	0
Beijing BSU	2014	China League One	7	1	0	0	0	0	7	1
Beijing BSU	2015	China League One	18	1	5	1	0	0	23	1
Beijing BSU	2016	China League One	15	1	0	0	0	0	15	1
Beijing BSU	2017	China League One	14	0	1	0	0	0	15	0
Beijing BSU	2018	China League One	21	1	0	0	0	0	21	1
Beijing BSU	2019	China League One	26	0	0	0	0	0	26	0
Beijing BSU	Total		102	4	7	1	0	0	109	5
Xi'an Wolves	2020	China League Two	7	0	0	0	0	0	7	0
Xi'an Wolves	2021	China League Two	4	0	0	0	0	0	4	0
Xi'an Wolves	Total		11	0	0	0	0	0	11	0
Beijing BSU	2021	China League One	5	0	0	0	0	0	5	0
Career total			118	4	7	1	0	0	125	5
