= Liu Chao (footballer) =

Chinese footballer

Personal information
- Full name: Liu Chao
- Date of birth: 7 September 1987 (age 39)
- Place of birth: Beijing, China
- Height: 1.70 m (5 ft 7 in)
- Positions: Left winger; left-back

Youth career
- 2004: Shenzhen Jianlibao

Senior career*
Years	Team	Apps	(Gls)
2005–2006	Anhui Jiufang		
2007–2009	Tianjin Songjiang		
2009	→ Shenzhen Ruby (loan)	28	(2)
2010	FK Sūduva	25	(5)
2011	Shenzhen Ruby	18	(1)
2012–2014	Shenyang Shenbei	73	(11)
2015	Hunan Billows	24	(1)
2016–2020	Shanghai Shenxin	75	(7)
2020	Hebei Aoli Jingying	8	(1)
2021–2022	Beijing BSU	51	(4)
- * Club domestic league appearances and goals as of 31 December 2020

Liu Chao (Chinese: 柳超; pinyin: Liǔ Chāo; born 7 September 1987 in Beijing) is a Chinese retired football player.

== Club career ==
Liu started his professional career with Anhui Jiufang in 2005 and transferred to another China League Two club Tianjin Songjiang in 2007. He was described by Tianjin Songjiang boss Hao Haidong as being a hot prospect for the future.

Liu was loaned out to Chinese Super League club Shenzhen Ruby in 2009 where throughout the season he steadily established himself in Shenzhen and scored his first CSL goal against Shaanxi Chanba in a 1–0 win on April 4. By the end of the campaign he played in 28 league games and scored 2 goals within the 2009 season.

Liu moved to Lithuania and signed a contract with FK Sūduva in 2010, which made him the first Chinese footballer playing in Lithuania. He scored his first goal for the club in the second leg of Lithuanian Cup Semifinals against FK Vėtra on 14 April. He scored his first league goal three days later, in a 5–0 away win against FK Atletas Kaunas.

On 14 February 2011, Liu signed a three-year contract with Shenzhen Ruby.

On 5 March 2015, Liu transferred to fellow China League One side Hunan Billows.

On 14 January 2016, Liu transferred to fellow China League One side Shanghai Shenxin.

== Career statistics ==
Statistics accurate as of match played 31 December 2020.

Appearances and goals by club, season, and competition
Club	Season	League			National Cup		League Cup		Continental		Total	
Club	Season	Division	Apps	Goals	Apps	Goals	Apps	Goals	Apps	Goals	Apps	Goals
Anhui Jiufang F.C.	2005	China League Two			-		-		-			
Anhui Jiufang F.C.	2006	China League Two			-		-		-			
Anhui Jiufang F.C.	Total				0	0	0	0	0	0		
Tianjin Songjiang	2007	China League Two			-		-		-			
Tianjin Songjiang	2008	China League Two			-		-		-			
Tianjin Songjiang	Total				0	0	0	0	0	0		
Shenzhen Ruby (loan)	2009	Chinese Super League	28	2	-		-		-		28	2
FK Sūduva Marijampolė	2010	A Lyga	25	5	2	1	4 (Note: Appearances in Baltic League)	0	0 (Note: Appearances in UEFA Europa League)	0	31	6
FK Sūduva Marijampolė	2011	A Lyga	0	0	1	0	2	0	2	0	5	0
FK Sūduva Marijampolė	Total		25	5	3	1	6	0	2	0	36	6
Shenzhen Ruby	2011	Chinese Super League	18	1	0	0	-		-		18	1
Shenyang Zhongze F.C.	2012	China League One	21	3	1	0	-		-		22	3
Shenyang Zhongze F.C.	2013	China League One	26	4	1	0	-		-		27	4
Shenyang Zhongze F.C.	2014	China League One	26	4	1	0	-		-		27	4
Shenyang Zhongze F.C.	Total		73	11	3	0	0	0	0	0	76	11
Hunan Billows	2015	China League One	24	1	0	0	-		-		24	1
Shanghai Shenxin	2016	China League One	26	4	1	0	-		-		27	4
Shanghai Shenxin	2017	China League One	21	0	5	0	-		-		26	0
Shanghai Shenxin	2018	China League One	11	0	2	0	-		-		13	0
Shanghai Shenxin	2019	China League One	17	3	0	0	-		-		17	3
Shanghai Shenxin	Total		75	7	8	0	0	0	0	0	83	7
Hebei Aoli Jingying	2020	China League Two	8	1	-		-		-		8	1
Beijing BSU	2021	China League One	0	0	0	0	-		-		0	0
Career total			251	28	14	1	6	0	2	0	273	29
