= Han Qingsong =

Chinese footballer

Han Qingsong 한청송 韩青松
Personal information
- Full name: Han Qingsong
- Date of birth: 5 December 1987 (age 38)
- Place of birth: Longjing, Jilin, China
- Height: 1.80 m (5 ft 11 in)
- Position: Defender

Youth career
- Yanbian FC

Senior career*
Years	Team	Apps	(Gls)
2005–2011	Yanbian FC	97	(1)
2012–2014	Chongqing Lifan	44	(0)
2015–2016	Qingdao Huanghai	27	(0)
2017–2018	Yanbian Funde	14	(1)
2019–2020	Qingdao Huanghai	14	(0)
- * Club domestic league appearances and goals as of 31 December 2020

Han Qingsong
- Simplified Chinese: 韩青松
Transcriptions
Standard Mandarin
- Hanyu Pinyin: Hán Qīngsōng
- IPA: [xǎn.tɕʰíŋ.sʊ́ŋ]

Chinese Korean name
- Chosŏn'gŭl: 한청송
Transcriptions
- Revised Romanization: Han Cheongsong
- McCune–Reischauer: Han Ch'ŏngsong

Han Qingsong (Chinese: 韩青松; Korean: 한청송; born 5 December 1987) is a Chinese former footballer who played as a defender.

== Club career ==
Han Qingsong started his professional football career in 2005 when he was promoted to China League One side Yanbian FC's first team squad. He scored his first senior goal on 18 September 2010 in a 2–1 away defeat against Guangzhou Evergrande. He made a brief trail with K League club Suwon Samsung Bluewings in January 2011.

Han transferred to fellow League One side Chongqing Lifan on 4 January 2012. On 17 March 2012, he made his debut for Chongqing in a 2–0 away defeat against Shanghai East Asia. He missed all 2014 league matches due to severe injury. Han joined another League One club Qingdao Hainiu on 14 February 2015. On 11 March 2016, he received a ban of two months by the Chinese Football Association for age falsification which he changed his age from 5 December 1987 to 5 February 1987.

Han returned to Yanbian Funde on 30 December 2016. He made his Super League debut on 5 March 2017 in a 0–0 away draw against Chongqing Lifan.

Han transferred back to Qingdao Huanghai in February 2019. In his return to the club he would help the team to win the 2019 China League One division and promotion into the top tier.

== Career statistics ==
Statistics accurate as of match played 31 December 2020.

Appearances and goals by club, season and competition
Club	Season	League			National Cup		Continental		Other		Total	
Club	Season	Division	Apps	Goals	Apps	Goals	Apps	Goals	Apps	Goals	Apps	Goals
Yanbian FC	2005	China League One	1	0	0	0	-		-		1	0
Yanbian FC	2006	China League One	4	0	0	0	-		-		4	0
Yanbian FC	2007	China League One	10	0	-		-		-		10	0
Yanbian FC	2008	China League One	14	0	-		-		-		14	0
Yanbian FC	2009	China League One	23	0	-		-		-		23	0
Yanbian FC	2010	China League One	22	1	-		-		-		22	1
Yanbian FC	2011	China League One	23	0	3	0	-		-		26	0
Yanbian FC	Total		97	1	3	0	0	0	0	0	100	1
Chongqing Lifan	2012	China League One	21	0	0	0	-		-		21	0
Chongqing Lifan	2013	China League One	23	0	0	0	-		-		23	0
Chongqing Lifan	2014	China League One	0	0	0	0	-		-		0	0
Chongqing Lifan	Total		44	0	0	0	0	0	0	0	44	0
Qingdao Huanghai	2015	China League One	24	0	0	0	-		-		24	0
Qingdao Huanghai	2016	China League One	3	0	0	0	-		-		3	0
Qingdao Huanghai	Total		27	0	0	0	0	0	0	0	27	0
Yanbian Funde	2017	Chinese Super League	7	0	0	0	-		-		7	0
Yanbian Funde	2018	China League One	7	1	1	0	-		-		8	1
Yanbian Funde	Total		14	1	1	0	0	0	0	0	15	1
Qingdao Huanghai	2019	China League One	14	0	2	0	-		-		16	0
Career total			196	2	6	0	0	0	0	0	202	2

== Honours ==
=== Club ===
Chongqing Lifan

- China League One: 2014

Qingdao Huanghai

- China League One: 2019
