= Huang Yuandong =

Chinese association football player

Personal information
- Date of birth: 27 February 1989 (age 37)
- Height: 1.86 m (6 ft 1 in)
- Position: Goalkeeper

Team information
- Current team: Zibo Qisheng

Senior career*
Years	Team	Apps	(Gls)
2014–2015	Hangzhou Greentown	0	(0)
2016–2019	Jilin Baijia	60	(0)
2020	Qinghai Oulu International		
2021	Xinjiang Tianshan Leopard	14	(0)
2022-	Zibo Qisheng	0	(0)
- * Club domestic league appearances and goals as of 14:01, 6 May 2022 (UTC)

Huang Yuandong (Chinese: 黄远东; born 27 February 1989) is a Chinese footballer currently playing as a goalkeeper for Zibo Qisheng in China League Two.

== Career statistics ==
=== Club ===
As of 9 August 2021.

Club	Season	League			Cup		Other		Total	
Club	Season	Division	Apps	Goals	Apps	Goals	Apps	Goals	Apps	Goals
Hangzhou Greentown	2014	Chinese Super League	0	0	2 (Note: Appearances in the Chinese FA Cup)	0	0	0	2	0
Hangzhou Greentown	2015	Chinese Super League	0	0	1	0	0	0	1	0
Hangzhou Greentown	Total		0	0	3	0	0	0	3	0
Jilin Baijia	2016	China League Two	–		0	0	0	0	0	0
Jilin Baijia	2017	China League Two	14	0	1	0	1 (Note: Appearances in the China League Two playoffs)	0	16	0
Jilin Baijia	2018	China League Two	18	0	0	0	0	0	18	0
Jilin Baijia	2019	China League Two	25	0	1	0	2	0	28	0
Jilin Baijia	Total		57	0	2	0	3	0	62	0
Xinjiang Tianshan Leopard	2021	China League One	10	0	0	0	0	0	10	0
Career total			67	0	5	0	3	0	75	0
