= Zhao Hongxu =

Chinese footballer

Zhao Hongxu 赵泓旭
Personal information
- Date of birth: March 27, 1991 (age 35)
- Place of birth: Jinzhou, Liaoning, China
- Height: 1.83 m (6 ft 0 in)
- Position: Midfielder

Youth career
- Shandong Luneng

Senior career*
Years	Team	Apps	(Gls)
2011	Shandong Luneng	0	(0)
2012–2015	Liaoning Whowin	1	(0)
2016–2018	Shanghai Sunfun	44	(2)
- * Club domestic league appearances and goals as of 1 October 2018

Zhao Hongxu (Chinese: 赵泓旭; born 27 March 1991) is a Chinese football player.

== Club career ==
In 2011, Zhao Hongxu started his professional footballer career with Shandong Luneng in the Chinese Super League. In February 2012, he transferred to Chinese Super League side Liaoning Whowin. He made his league debut for Liaoning on 28 September 2012 in a game against Tianjin Teda, coming on as a substitute for Wang Hao in the 63rd minute.

== Club career statistics ==
Statistics accurate as of match played 1 October 2018

Club performance			League		Cup		League Cup		Continental		Total	
Season	Club	League	Apps	Goals	Apps	Goals	Apps	Goals	Apps	Goals	Apps	Goals
China PR			League		FA Cup		CSL Cup		Asia		Total	
2011	Shandong Luneng	Chinese Super League	0	0	0	0	-		-		0	0
2012	Liaoning Whowin	Chinese Super League	1	0	0	0	-		-		1	0
2013	Liaoning Whowin	Chinese Super League	0	0	1	0	-		-		1	0
2014	Liaoning Whowin	Chinese Super League	0	0	0	0	-		-		0	0
2015	Liaoning Whowin	Chinese Super League	0	0	0	0	-		-		0	0
2016	Shanghai Sunfun	Amateur League	-		-		-		-		-	
2017	Shanghai Sunfun	China League Two	23	0	3	0	-		-		26	0
2018	Shanghai Sunfun	China League Two	21	2	1	0	-		-		22	2
Total	China PR		45	2	5	0	0	0	0	0	50	2
