= Wang Kai (footballer, born 1983) =

Chinese footballer

Wang Kai 王锴
Personal information
- Date of birth: January 22, 1983 (age 43)
- Place of birth: Chongqing, Sichuan, China
- Height: 1.80 m (5 ft 11 in)
- Positions: Midfielder; defender

Youth career
- Chongqing Lifan

Senior career*
Years	Team	Apps	(Gls)
2002–2011	Chongqing Lifan	163	(34)
2011	→ Chengdu Blades (loan)	14	(3)
2012–2014	Chengdu Blades	71	(10)
2015	Sichuan Longfor	18	(5)
2016–2020	Nantong Zhiyun	59	(4)
- * Club domestic league appearances and goals as of 31 December 2020

Wang Kai (simplified Chinese: 王锴; traditional Chinese: 王鍇; pinyin: Wáng Kǎi; born January 22, 1983, in Chongqing) was a Chinese football player who played as a midfielder or defender.

== Club career ==
Wang Kai started his football career playing for the Chongqing Lifan youth team before he was drafted into the senior team in the 2002 league season. The following seasons saw him gradually establish himself as an integral part of the team and would even go on to captain the side before the club were relegated in the 2006 league season. Wang Kai stayed loyal to the team and after two seasons in the second tier he had his personal best season when he scored ten goals in the 2008 league season to aid Chongqing back into the top tier.

At the end of the 2010 Chinese Super League season Wang Kai would be part of the squad that was relegated at the end of the season. He would go on to join Chengdu Blades, initially on loan before making the move permanent the following season. He would remain with them until the end of the 2014 China League One season when the club experienced relegation and were dissolved due to wage arrears. On 16 January 2015, Wang moved to China League Two side Sichuan Longfor. This was followed by another move the next season when on 22 January 2016, Wang transferred to fellow China League Two side Nantong Zhiyun. He would go on to establish himself as a regular within the team and gained promotion with the club at the end of the 2018 China League Two season.

== Club career stats ==
Last update: 31 December 2020.

Appearances and goals by club, season and competition
Club	Season	League			National Cup		Continental		Other		Total	
Club	Season	Division	Apps	Goals	Apps	Goals	Apps	Goals	Apps	Goals	Apps	Goals
Chongqing Lifan	2002	Chinese Jia-A League	3	0	0	0	-		-		3	0
Chongqing Lifan	2003	Chinese Jia-A League	14	1	1	2	-		-		15	3
Chongqing Lifan	2004	Chinese Super League	20	0	1	1	-		-		21	1
Chongqing Lifan	2005	Chinese Super League	24	3	1	1	-		-		25	4
Chongqing Lifan	2006	Chinese Super League	22	0	0	0	-		-		22	0
Chongqing Lifan	2007	China League One	21	16	-		-		-		21	16
Chongqing Lifan	2008	China League One	24	11	-		-		-		24	11
Chongqing Lifan	2009	Chinese Super League	14	1	-		-		-		14	1
Chongqing Lifan	2010	Chinese Super League	21	2	-		-		-		21	2
Chongqing Lifan	Total		163	34	3	4	0	0	0	0	166	38
Chengdu Blades (loan)	2011	Chinese Super League	14	3	0	0	-		-		14	3
Chengdu Blades	2012	China League One	24	2	1	0	-		-		25	2
Chengdu Blades	2013	China League One	23	5	0	0	-		-		23	5
Chengdu Blades	2014	China League One	24	3	0	0	-		-		24	3
Chengdu Blades	Total		71	10	1	0	0	0	0	0	72	10
Sichuan Longfor	2015	China League Two	18	5	0	0	-		-		18	5
Nantong Zhiyun	2016	China League Two	16	1	1	0	-		-		17	1
Nantong Zhiyun	2017	China League Two	18	2	1	0	-		-		19	2
Nantong Zhiyun	2018	China League Two	23	1	1	0	-		-		24	1
Nantong Zhiyun	2019	China League One	2	0	0	0	-		-		2	0
Nantong Zhiyun	2020	China League One	0	0	-		-		-		0	0
Nantong Zhiyun	Total		59	4	3	0	0	0	0	0	62	4
Career total			325	56	7	4	0	0	0	0	332	60
