= Vlado Jeknić =

Montenegrin footballer

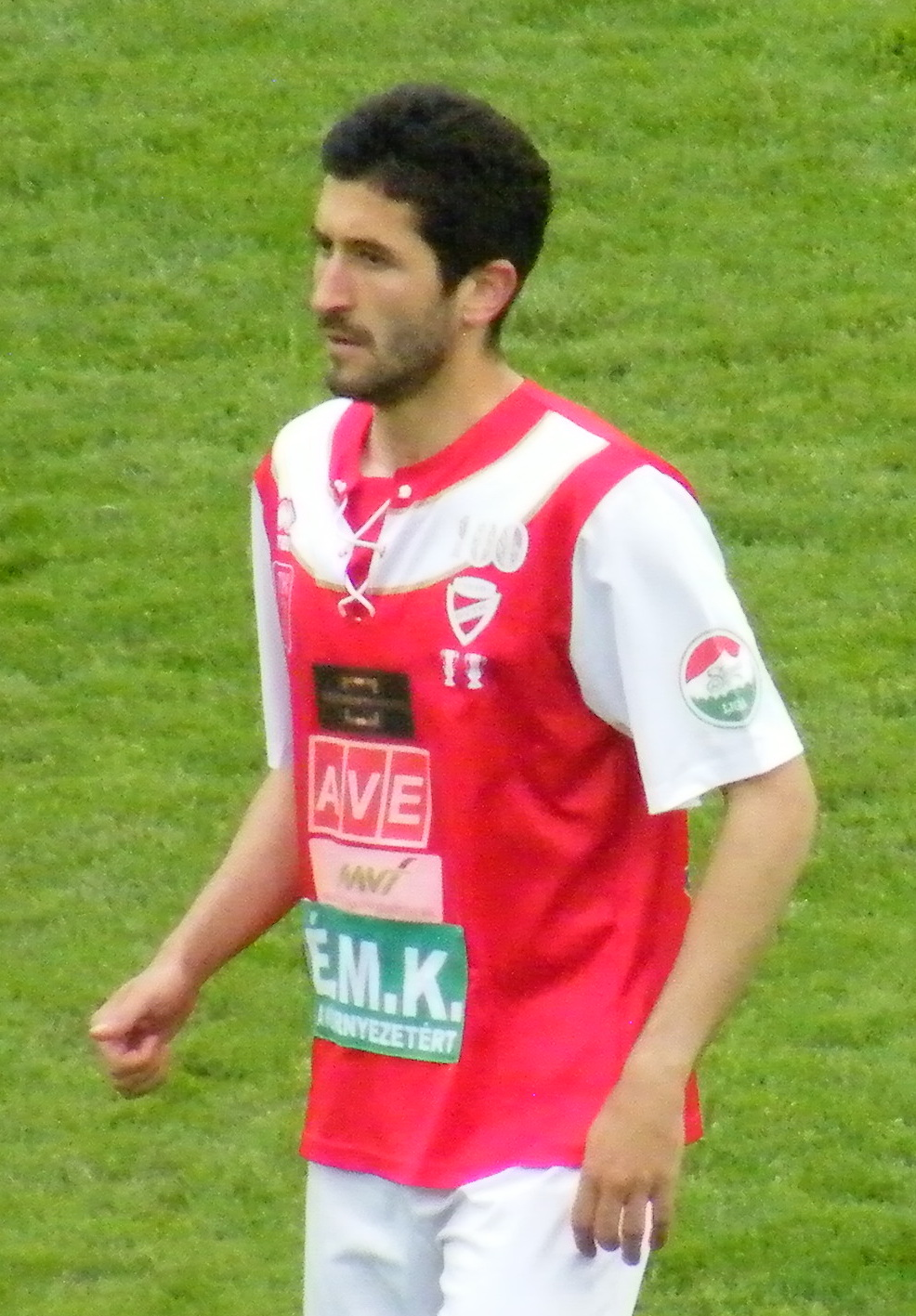

Personal information
- Date of birth: 14 August 1983 (age 43)
- Place of birth: Šavnik, Montenegro, Yugoslavia
- Height: 1.89 m (6 ft 2 in)
- Position: Defender

Youth career
- 1993–2000: FK Crvena Stijena

Senior career*
Years	Team	Apps	(Gls)
2000–2002	Crvena Stijena	29	(3)
2002–2005	Sutjeska Nikšić	75	(1)
2005–2007	Wacker Burghausen	40	(1)
2007–2009	SV Wehen Wiesbaden	17	(1)
2009–2010	Diósgyőri VTK	12	(1)
2009–2010	→ Diósgyőri VTK II (loan)	4	(0)
2010–2011	Beijing Baxy&Shengshi	19	(3)
2012	Fujian Smart Hero	19	(2)
2014-2015	Sutjeska Nikšić	9	(0)

International career
2005–2006	Serbia and Montenegro U-21	18	(0)
2007–2008	Montenegro	6	(0)
- * Club domestic league appearances and goals as of 28 March 2011

Vlado Jeknić (Cyrillic: Владо Јекнић, born 14 August 1983) is a Montenegrin retired footballer who last played for Sutjeska in the Montenegrin First League.

== Club career ==
Jeknić played for the German sides SV Wacker Burghausen and SV Wehen Wiesbaden in the 2. Bundesliga and Diósgyőri VTK in Hungary.

He transferred to the Chinese club Beijing Baxy&Shengshi in July 2010 and moved to the Chinese club Fujian Smart Hero in March 2012.

== International career ==
Jeknić made his debut for Montenegro in his country's first ever competitive match on 24 March 2007, a friendly against Hungary in Podgorica. He has earned a total six caps, scoring no goals. His final international was another friendly against Hungary in August 2008.
