= Wan Cheng =

Chinese footballer

Wan Cheng 万程
Personal information
- Full name: Wan Cheng
- Date of birth: November 1, 1985 (age 41)
- Place of birth: Tianjin, China
- Height: 1.81 m (5 ft 11 in)
- Positions: Striker; attacking midfielder

Youth career
- 1998–2000: Tianjin Locomotive
- 2000–2002: Shandong Luneng

Senior career*
Years	Team	Apps	(Gls)
2002–2010	Shandong Luneng	15	(0)
2011	Chongqing F.C.	9	(1)
2012–2017	Tianjin Songjiang	71	(2)
2017–2020	Yinchuan Helanshan	72	(11)
2020	Guangxi Pingguo Haliao	6	(0)

International career
2004	China U-20	?	(0)
- * Club domestic league appearances and goals as of 31 December 2020

Wan Cheng (simplified Chinese: 万程; traditional Chinese: 萬程; pinyin: Wàn Chéng) (born 1 November 1985 in Tianjin) is a Chinese football player.

== Club career ==
Wan Cheng started his professional football career at Shandong Luneng after he joined them from Tianjin Locomotive's youth team. He made his senior league debut on October 27, 2002 in a league match between Shandong Luneng and Shanxi Guoli as a promising 16-year-old. Under Russian coach Valeri Nepomniachi he was a mainly used as substitute throughout the 2002 and 2003 league seasons to gradually establish himself within the team. However, he lost favor in the club when Serbian coach Ljubiša Tumbaković came in at the beginning of the 2004 league season and Wan Cheng saw his appearances drop to only two throughout the 2004 league season. Throughout 2005 to 2007 league seasons Wan Cheng would have spent most of his time in the reserves and would have to re-establish himself within the team, eventually returning into the senior team on April 27, 2008 in a league match against Dalian Shide.

On 25 February 2017, Wan transferred to League Two side Yinchuan Helanshan.

== Career statistics ==
Statistics accurate as of match played 31 December 2020.

Appearances and goals by club, season and competition
Club	Season	League			National Cup		League Cup		Continental		Total	
Club	Season	Division	Apps	Goals	Apps	Goals	Apps	Goals	Apps	Goals	Apps	Goals
Shandong Luneng	2002	Chinese Jia-A League	7	0	0	0	-		-		7	0
Shandong Luneng	2003	Chinese Jia-A League	2	0	1	0	-		-		3	0
Shandong Luneng	2004	Chinese Super League	2	0	1	0	0	0	-		3	0
Shandong Luneng	2005	Chinese Super League	0	0	0	0	0	0	0	0	0	0
Shandong Luneng	2006	Chinese Super League	0	0	0	0	-		-		0	0
Shandong Luneng	2007	Chinese Super League	0	0	-		-		0	0	0	0
Shandong Luneng	2008	Chinese Super League	1	0	-		-		-		1	0
Shandong Luneng	2009	Chinese Super League	3	0	-		-		1	0	4	0
Shandong Luneng	2010	Chinese Super League	0	0	-		-		0	0	0	0
Shandong Luneng	Total		15	0	2	0	0	0	1	0	18	0
Chongqing F.C.	2011	China League Two	9	1	-		-		-		9	1
Tianjin Songjiang	2012	China League One	9	0	0	0	-		-		9	0
Tianjin Songjiang	2013	China League One	19	0	1	0	-		-		20	0
Tianjin Songjiang	2014	China League One	11	0	0	0	-		-		11	0
Tianjin Songjiang	2015	China League One	21	1	1	0	-		-		22	1
Tianjin Songjiang	2016	China League One	11	1	2	0	-		-		13	1
Tianjin Songjiang	Total		71	2	4	0	0	0	0	0	75	2
Yinchuan Helanshan	2017	China League Two	23	4	1	0	-		-		24	4
Yinchuan Helanshan	2018	China League Two	19	0	1	0	-		-		20	0
Yinchuan Helanshan	2019	China League Two	30	7	1	0	-		-		31	7
Yinchuan Helanshan	Total		72	11	3	0	0	0	0	0	75	11
Guangxi Pingguo Haliao	2020	China League Two	6	0	-		-		-		6	0
Career total			173	14	9	0	0	0	1	0	183	14

== Honours ==
=== Club ===
Shandong Luneng

- Chinese Super League: 2006, 2008
- Chinese FA Cup: 2004, 2006
- Chinese Super League Cup: 2004

Tianjin Quanjian F.C.

- China League One: 2016
