= Zhang Li (footballer, born August 1989) =

Chinese footballer

Zhang Li 张力
Personal information
- Full name: Zhang Li
- Date of birth: 6 August 1989 (age 37)
- Place of birth: Luoyang, Henan, China
- Height: 1.72 m (5 ft 7 1/2 in)
- Position: Midfielder

Team information
- Current team: Changchun Yatai (assistant coach)

Youth career
- 2004–2008: Henan Jianye

Senior career*
| Years | Team | Apps | (Gls) |
| 2009–2016 | Henan Jianye | 42 | (2) |
| 2015 | → Wuhan Zall (loan) | 20 | (0) |
| 2017 | Beijing Guoan | 0 | (0) |
| 2017–2023 | Changchun Yatai | 92 | (3) |

Managerial career
- 2023–: Changchun Yatai (assistant)
- * Club domestic league appearances and goals as of 31 December 2022

Zhang Li (Chinese: 张力; born 6 August 1989) is a Chinese former footballer who played as a midfielder.

== Club career ==
In 2009, Zhang Li started his professional footballer career with Henan Jianye in the Chinese Super League. He eventually made his league debut for Henan on 21 May 2011 in a game against Dalian Shide. In February 2015, he was loaned to China League One club Wuhan Zall until 31 December 2015. He was sent to the reserved team in 2016.

In February 2017, Zhang moved to fellow Super League side Changchun Yatai. He would go on to make his debut for the club in a league game against Guangzhou R&F F.C. on 12 March 2017, which ended in a 1-0 defeat. On 4 August 2018 in a league game against Shanghai Shenhua, Zhang was accused of racially abusing opposing player Demba Ba. An investigation by the Chinese Football Association saw Zhang officially guilty of causing chaos, however no reference to racial abuse was mentioned. He was handed a six match ban and a fine of 42,000 yuan (US$6,100) on 10 August 2018.

== Career statistics ==
Statistics accurate as of match played 31 December 2022.

Appearances and goals by club, season and competition
| Club | Season | League | | | National Cup | | Continental | | Other | | Total | |
| Club | Season | Division | Apps | Goals | Apps | Goals | Apps | Goals | Apps | Goals | Apps | Goals |
|---|---|---|---|---|---|---|---|---|---|---|---|---|
| Henan Jianye | 2009 | Chinese Super League | 0 | 0 | - | | - | | - | | 0 | 0 |
| Henan Jianye | 2010 | Chinese Super League | 0 | 0 | - | | 0 | 0 | - | | 0 | 0 |
| Henan Jianye | 2011 | Chinese Super League | 9 | 0 | 3 | 0 | - | | - | | 12 | 0 |
| Henan Jianye | 2012 | Chinese Super League | 20 | 2 | 0 | 0 | - | | - | | 20 | 2 |
| Henan Jianye | 2013 | China League One | 3 | 0 | 0 | 0 | - | | - | | 3 | 0 |
| Henan Jianye | 2014 | Chinese Super League | 10 | 0 | 3 | 1 | - | | - | | 13 | 1 |
| Henan Jianye | Total | | 42 | 2 | 6 | 1 | 0 | 0 | 0 | 0 | 48 | 3 |
| Wuhan Zall (loan) | 2015 | China League One | 20 | 0 | 0 | 0 | - | | - | | 20 | 0 |
| Changchun Yatai | 2017 | Chinese Super League | 25 | 0 | 1 | 0 | - | | - | | 26 | 0 |
| Changchun Yatai | 2018 | Chinese Super League | 18 | 1 | 0 | 0 | - | | - | | 18 | 1 |
| Changchun Yatai | 2019 | China League One | 26 | 2 | 0 | 0 | - | | - | | 26 | 2 |
| Changchun Yatai | 2020 | China League One | 8 | 0 | 2 | 0 | - | | - | | 10 | 0 |
| Changchun Yatai | 2021 | Chinese Super League | 6 | 0 | 2 | 0 | - | | - | | 6 | 0 |
| Changchun Yatai | 2022 | Chinese Super League | 9 | 0 | 1 | 0 | - | | - | | 10 | 0 |
| Changchun Yatai | Total | | 92 | 3 | 12 | 0 | 0 | 0 | 0 | 0 | 96 | 3 |
| Career total | | | 155 | 5 | 10 | 1 | 0 | 0 | 0 | 0 | 164 | 6 |

== Honours ==
=== Club ===
Henan Jianye

- China League One: 2013

Changchun Yatai

- China League One: 2020
