= Lü Wei (footballer) =

Chinese footballer

Lü Wei 吕伟
Personal information
- Date of birth: 18 January 1989 (age 37)
- Place of birth: Tianjin, China
- Height: 1.83 m (6 ft 0 in)
- Position: Defender

Youth career
- Tianjin Locomotive
- 2008: Tianjin Teda

Senior career*
Years	Team	Apps	(Gls)
2006–2007	Tianjin Locomotive	?	(?)
2009–2016	Tianjin Teda	45	(0)
2011–2012	→ Shenyang Dongjin (loan)	44	(1)
2017–2019	Liaoning Whowin	56	(0)
2020–2021	Sichuan Jiuniu	11	(0)
- * Club domestic league appearances and goals as of 31 December 2020

Lü Wei (Chinese: 吕伟; born 18 January 1989 in Tianjin) is a Chinese footballer who plays as a defender.

== Club career ==
Lü started his professional career with Chinese Super League side Tianjin Teda in 2009. He was sent to the reserved team in 2010. In February 2011, he moved to China League One side Shenyang Dongjin on a two-year loan deal. He returned to Tianjin in 2013 after Shenyang Dongjin relegated to China League Two. On 1 June 2013, he eventually made his Super League debut for Tianjin in a 1–0 away defeat against Dalian Aerbin.

On 4 January 2017, Lü moved to fellow Super League side Liaoning Whowin. He made his debut for Liaoning on 3 March 2017 in a 1–1 away draw against Guizhou Zhicheng, coming on as a substitute for Ni Yusong in the half time.

== Career statistics ==
Statistics accurate as of match played 31 December 2020.

Appearances and goals by club, season and competition
Club	Season	League			National Cup		Continental		Other		Total	
Club	Season	Division	Apps	Goals	Apps	Goals	Apps	Goals	Apps	Goals	Apps	Goals
Tianjin Locomotive	2006	China League Two			-		-		-			
Tianjin Locomotive	2007	China League Two			-		-		-			
Tianjin Locomotive	Total				0	0	0	0	0	0		
Tianjin Teda	2009	Chinese Super League	0	0	-		0	0	-		0	0
Tianjin Teda	2013	Chinese Super League	17	0	1	0	-		-		18	0
Tianjin Teda	2014	Chinese Super League	3	0	0	0	-		-		3	0
Tianjin Teda	2015	Chinese Super League	23	0	0	0	-		-		23	0
Tianjin Teda	2016	Chinese Super League	2	0	2	0	-		-		4	0
Tianjin Teda	Total		45	0	3	0	0	0	0	0	48	0
Shenyang Dongjin (loan)	2011	China League One	24	1	0	0	-		-		24	1
Shenyang Dongjin (loan)	2012	China League One	20	0	0	0	-		-		20	0
Shenyang Dongjin (loan)	Total		44	1	0	0	0	0	0	0	44	1
Liaoning FC	2017	Chinese Super League	18	0	0	0	-		-		18	0
Liaoning FC	2018	China League One	27	0	0	0	-		-		27	0
Liaoning FC	2019	China League One	11	0	2	0	-		-		13	0
Liaoning FC	Total		56	0	2	0	0	0	0	0	58	0
Sichuan Jiuniu	2020	China League One	11	0	-		-		-		11	0
Career total			156	1	5	0	0	0	0	0	161	1
