= Zhang Chen (footballer) =

Chinese footballer

Zhang Chen 张晨
Personal information
- Date of birth: 17 December 1981 (age 44)
- Place of birth: Shanghai, China
- Height: 1.87 m (6 ft 2 in)
- Position: Goalkeeper

Team information
- Current team: Ningbo FC (goalkeeping coach)

Youth career
- 1998–2001: Shanghai Pudong

Senior career*
Years	Team	Apps	(Gls)
2001–2006	Shanghai International	60	(0)
2007–2011	Shanghai Shenhua	3	(0)
2010	→ Pudong Zobon (loan)	13	(0)
2011	→ Shenyang Dongjin (loan)	21	(0)
2013–2014	Chengdu Blades	31	(0)
2015–2017	Shanghai Jiading Boji	8	(0)

Managerial career
- 2015–: Ningbo FC (goalkeeping)
- * Club domestic league appearances and goals as of 12 November 2014

Zhang Chen (simplified Chinese: 张晨; traditional Chinese: 張晨; pinyin: Zhāng Chen; born on 17 December 1981) is a Chinese football coach and former footballer who played as a goalkeeper.

== Club career ==
Zhang Chen started his professional soccer career after he graduated from the Shanghai Pudong youth team in 2001 to the senior team and was part of the squad that won promoted to the top tier of the Chinese soccer league system at the renamed Shanghai International. After several seasons he transferred to top tier club Shanghai Shenhua in the 2006 season as reserve choice goalkeeper. However, before he was allowed to establish himself within the squad Shanghai Shenhua merged with Shanghai United F.C. that brought about an influx of players and Zhang Chen found himself competing with significantly more players for places. Despite this Zhang Chen continued to play for Shanghai and was rewarded with his persistence when he was named as the first choice goalkeeper for Shanghai Shenhua at the beginning of the 2009 season against Singapore Armed Forces in the AFC Champions League. However his reign was short lived and he was replaced by Qiu Shengjiong after a disappointing performance against Kashima Antlers where Shanghai lost an AFC Champions League game. As the season progressed he would be relegated to third choice goalkeeper and at the beginning of the 2010 league season he would move to second tier club Pudong Zobon F.C. to gain more playing time.

Zhang transferred to Shenyang Dongjin in February 2011 before another transfer to Chengdu Blades in January 2012.

== Honours ==
Shanghai International

- Chinese Jia B league: 2001
