= Hu Wei (footballer) =

Chinese association football player

Personal information
- Date of birth: 1 January 1983 (age 43)
- Place of birth: Hangzhou, Zhejiang, China
- Height: 1.78 m (5 ft 10 in)
- Position: Defender

Youth career
- 1998–2003: Yunnan Hongta

Senior career*
Years	Team	Apps	(Gls)
2004–2011	Chongqing Lifan	57	(1)
2011	→ Chengdu Tiancheng (loan)	15	(0)
2012–2016	Shijiazhuang Ever Bright	54	(0)
2017	Nantong Zhiyun	15	(0)
Total		141	(1)

Managerial career
- 2026: Lanzhou Longyuan Athletic (assistant)
- * Club domestic league appearances and goals as of 14:01, 18 May 2019 (UTC)

Hu Wei (simplified Chinese: 胡伟; traditional Chinese: 胡偉; pinyin: Hú Wěi; born 1 January 1983) is a Chinese football coach and former footballer.

== Career statistics ==
=== Club ===
Club	Season	League			Cup		Other		Total	
Club	Season	Division	Apps	Goals	Apps	Goals	Apps	Goals	Apps	Goals
Chongqing Lifan	2009	Chinese Super League	29	0	0	0	0	0	29	0
Chongqing Lifan	2010	Chinese Super League	28	1	0	0	0	0	28	1
Chongqing Lifan	2011	Chinese Super League	0	0	0	0	0	0	0	0
Chongqing Lifan	2012	Chinese Super League	0	0	0	0	0	0	0	0
Chongqing Lifan	Total		57	1	0	0	0	0	57	1
Chengdu Tiancheng (loan)	2011	Chinese Super League	15	0	0	0	0	0	15	0
Shijiazhuang Ever Bright	2012	China League One	1	0	0	0	0	0	1	0
Shijiazhuang Ever Bright	2013	China League One	0	0	1 (Note: Appearances in the Chinese FA Cup)	0	0	0	1	0
Shijiazhuang Ever Bright	2014	Chinese Super League	18	0	0	0	0	0	18	0
Shijiazhuang Ever Bright	2015	Chinese Super League	26	0	0	0	0	0	26	0
Shijiazhuang Ever Bright	2016	Chinese Super League	9	0	2	0	0	0	11	0
Shijiazhuang Ever Bright	Total		54	0	3	0	0	0	57	0
Nantong Zhiyun	2017	China League Two	15	0	1	0	1 (Note: Appearances in the China League Two playoffs)	0	17	0
Career total			141	1	4	0	1	0	146	1
