= Shenyang Zhongze F.C. =

Chinese football club

Shenyang Zhongze Shěnyáng Zhōngzé 沈阳中泽
- Full name: Shenyang Zhongze Football Club 沈阳中泽足球俱乐部
- Founded: 2009; 17 years ago
- Dissolved: February 27, 2015; 11 years ago
- Ground: Shenyang Olympic Sports Center Stadium, Shenyang
- Capacity: 60,000
Home colours	Away colours

Shenyang Zhongze F.C. (simplified Chinese: 沈阳中泽; traditional Chinese: 瀋陽中澤; pinyin: Shěnyáng Zhōngzé) was a former professional Chinese football club that participated in the Chinese League One division.

== History ==
The club was founded in August 2009 as Tianjin Runyulong and was initially set-up as an amateur football team to take part in the amateur leagues. At the beginning of the 2011 league season, Tianjin Runyulong would decide to take over Anhui Jiufang and took their position in the China League One division. The club would make Liu Zhicai their first professional manager and play in the 18,000-seat Minyuan Stadium in Tianjin while wearing an all red strip within their debut season. The club would quickly find out that the full acquisition of Anhui Jiufang as well as the running cost of the club would cost them 540 million yuan, more than the club expected and that they would need to quickly find investment if they were to pay their players on time. The investment would come from the local Shenbei government who wanted them to move into the 30,000-seat Tiexi Stadium in Shenyang. In July 2011, Tianjin Runyulong moved to the city of Shenyang and the name changed to Shenyang Shenbei.

Shenyang Zhongze failed to transfer of ownership after they finished 11th of League One in the 2014 season. On 15 January 2015, it is reported that they gave up to register for the 2015 league season and dissolved. However, Shenyang Zhongze appeared on the list of registered clubs for the 2015 league season several days later. Shenyang Zhongze was officially dissolved on 27 February 2015.

== Results ==
All-time league rankings

As of the end of 2014 season.

Year	Div	Pld	W	D	L	GF	GA	GD	Pts	Pos.	FA Cup	Super Cup	AFC	Att./G	Stadium
2011	2	26	8	10	8	31	31	0	34	6	R2	DNQ	DNQ		Minyuan Stadium / Tiexi Stadium
2012	2	30	9	11	10	36	38	−2	38	12	R3	DNQ	DNQ	1,018	Shenyang Sport University Stadium
2013	2	30	13	8	9	46	39	7	47	6	R3	DNQ	DNQ	1,038	Shenyang Sport University Stadium / Shenyang Olympic Sports Center Stadium
2014	2	30	8	11	11	27	30	−3	35	11	R3	DNQ	DNQ	6,156	Shenyang Olympic Sports Center Stadium

Key

	China top division
	China second division
	China third division
W	Winners
RU	Runners-up
3	Third place
	Relegated

- Pld = Played
- W = Games won
- D = Games drawn
- L = Games lost
- F = Goals for
- A = Goals against
- Pts = Points
- Pos = Final position
- DNQ = Did not qualify
- DNE = Did not enter
- NH = Not held
- – = Does not exist
- R1 = Round 1
- R2 = Round 2
- R3 = Round 3
- R4 = Round 4
- F = Final
- SF = Semi-finals
- QF = Quarter-finals
- R16 = Round of 16
- Group = Group stage
- GS2 = Second Group stage
- QR1 = First Qualifying Round
- QR2 = Second Qualifying Round
- QR3 = Third Qualifying Round

== Notable players ==
Had international caps for their respective countries.

Europe

- (Montenegro) Vladimir Vujović
- (Serbia) Zoran Rendulić
