= Shenyang Dongjin F.C. =

Chinese football club

Shenyang Dongjin Shěnyáng Dōngjìn 沈阳东进
- Full name: Shenyang Dongjin Football Club 沈阳东进足球俱乐部
- Founded: 11 June 1996; 29 years ago
- Dissolved: 11 July 2018
- 2018: League Two, 28th
Home colours	Away colours

Shenyang Dongjin Football Club (simplified Chinese: 沈阳东进; traditional Chinese: 瀋陽東進; pinyin: Shěnyáng Dōngjìn) was a Chinese football club based in Shenyang, Liaoning and their home stadium is the Shenyang Urban Construction University Stadium that has a seating capacity of 12,000.

== History ==
Founded as Jinan Fulu Football Club in Jinan on 11 June 1996, they were renamed Jinan Sanyun after their first ever China League Two season that year. In 1999, they were renamed again as Jining Dranix Football Club (Simplified Chinese: 济宁九巨龙足球俱乐部) after moving to Jining. They stayed there until 2004. In 2005, they moved to Cixi and were renamed Ningbo Cixi Chipard Football Club (Simplified Chinese: 宁波慈溪中豹足球俱乐部). There, they played at Ningbo Cixi Stadium. They didn't compete in the 2007 season and moved to Shenyang at the start of the 2008 China League Two season, renaming themselves again as Shenyang Dongjin.

In February 2012, Shenyang Dongjin announced they would move to Hohhot for the 2012 and 2013 league seasons, during which they would be renamed as Hohhot Dongjin. The club finished in the bottom of the league and was relegated to League Two.

On 11 July 2018, the Chinese Football Association announced that Shenyang Dongjin failed to register for the rest of the season due to wage arrears, which marks the end of the club and its history which spans more than two decades.

== Name history ==
- 1996 Jinan Fulu 济南富禄
- 1997–1999 Jinan Sanyun 济南三运
- 1999–2004 Jining Dranix 济宁九巨龙
- 2005–2006 Ningbo Cixi Chipard 宁波慈溪中豹
- 2008–2011 Shenyang Dongjin 沈阳东进
- 2012–2013 Hohhot Dongjin 呼和浩特东进
- 2014–2018 Shenyang Dongjin 沈阳东进

== Managerial history ==
Shenyang Dongjin

- (China) Duan Xin (2008–2009)
- (China) Yu Ming (2010–2011)
- (China) Chen Bo (2012)
- (China) Yang Yumin (caretaker, 2012)
- (China) Zhao Faqing (2013)
- (China) Li Wei (2014–2015)
- (South Korea) Lee Woo-hyung (2016–2017)
- (China) Wang Gang (2017)
- (Serbia) Marjan Živković (2018)

== Club honours ==
- China League Two (tier-III)
  - Champions (1): 2008

== Results ==
All-time League Rankings

As of the end of 2018 season.

Year	Div	Pld	W	D	L	GF	GA	GD	Pts	Pos.	FA Cup	Super Cup	AFC	Att./G	Stadium
1996	3										DNE	DNQ	DNQ		
2000	3									5^{1}	DNE	DNQ	DNQ		
2001	3									4^{1}	DNE	DNQ	DNQ		
2002	3									5^{1}	DNE	DNQ	DNQ		
2003	3	12	4	3	5	12	18	−6	12^{1}	6	DNE	DNQ	DNQ		Tai'an City Stadium
2004	3	22	10	7	5	32	25	7	34^{1}	7	DNE	DNQ	DNQ		Tai'an City Stadium
2005	3	14	2	1	11	11	26	−15	7	7^{1}	DNE	NH	DNQ		Cixi City Sports Centre
2006	3	16	0	5	11	4	23	−19	5	9^{1}	DNE	NH	DNQ		Cixi City Stadium
2008	3	17	11	5	1	25	8	17	16^{1}	W	NH	NH	DNQ		Shenyang Artillery Institute Stadium
2009	2	24	12	8	4	39	21	18	44	3	NH	NH	DNQ		Shenyang Olympic Sports Center Stadium
2010	2	24	6	12	6	23	23	0	30	7	NH	NH	DNQ		Shenyang Olympic Sports Center Stadium
2011	2	26	9	10	7	32	25	7	37	5	R1	NH	DNQ		Shenyang Olympic Sports Center Stadium
2012	2	30	5	12	13	30	42	−12	27	16	R3	DNQ	DNQ	8,978	Hohhot City Stadium
2013	3	14	4	4	6	14	12	−7	16	5^{1}	R2	DNQ	DNQ		Hohhot City Stadium Benxi Stadium
2014	3	14	5	2	7	16	25	−9	17	5^{1}	R2	DNQ	DNQ		Shenyang Urban Construction University Stadium
2015	3	14	0	0	14	3	67	−64	0	8^{1}	R1	DNQ	DNQ		Shenyang Urban Construction University Stadium
2016	3	20	2	5	13	18	43	−25	11	19	R1	DNQ	DNQ	587	Shenyang Urban Construction University Stadium
2017	3	24	1	7	16	12	38	−26	10	24^{2}	R1	DNQ	DNQ	305	Shenyang Urban Construction University Stadium
2018	3	26	0	0	26	0	81	−81	0	28	R2	DNQ	DNQ	210	Shenyang Urban Construction University Stadium

The club did not compete in 2007 season.

- ^1 In group stage.
- ^2 Zhaoqing Hengtai gave up to turn professional and remained at the amateur league, so Shenyang Dongjin could stay at third level.

Key

	China top division
	China second division
	China third division
	China fourth division
W	Winners
RU	Runners-up
3	Third place
	Relegated

- Pld = Played
- W = Games won
- D = Games drawn
- L = Games lost
- F = Goals for
- A = Goals against
- Pts = Points
- Pos = Final position
- DNQ = Did not qualify
- DNE = Did not enter
- NH = Not Held
- – = Does Not Exist
- R1 = Round 1
- R2 = Round 2
- R3 = Round 3
- R4 = Round 4
- F = Final
- SF = Semi-finals
- QF = Quarter-finals
- R16 = Round of 16
- Group = Group stage
- GS2 = Second Group stage
- QR1 = First Qualifying Round
- QR2 = Second Qualifying Round
- QR3 = Third Qualifying Round
