= 2012 Chinese FA Cup =

2012 The Chinese Football Association Cup
CFA Cup

Tournament details
- Country: China
- Teams: 48

Final positions
- Champions: Guangzhou Evergrande (1st title)
- Runners-up: Guizhou Renhe
- AFC Champions League: Guangzhou Evergrande

Tournament statistics
- Matches played: 50
- Goals scored: 153 (3.06 per match)
- Top goal scorer: (Spain) Rafa Jordà (6 goals)

Awards
- Best player: (Paraguay) Lucas Barrios

The TOSHIBA 2012 Chinese FA Cup (Chinese: 东芝2012中国足球协会杯) was the 14th edition of the Chinese FA Cup. The first round matches began on 26 May 2012, and the finals took place on 10 November and 18 November 2012.

The cup title sponsor was Japanese company Toshiba.

== Participants ==
=== Chinese Super League ===
Total 16 teams took part in 2012 CFA Cup.

- Beijing Guoan
- Changchun Yatai
- Dalian Aerbin
- Dalian Shide
- Guangzhou Evergrande
- Guangzhou R&F
- Guizhou Renhe
- Hangzhou Greentown
- Henan Jianye
- Jiangsu Sainty
- Liaoning Whowin
- Qingdao Jonoon
- Shandong Luneng Taishan
- Shanghai Shenhua
- Shanghai Shenxin
- Tianjin Teda ^{TH}

=== China League One ===
Total 16 teams took part in 2012 CFA Cup.

- Beijing BIT
- Beijing Baxy
- Chengdu Blades
- Chongqing FC
- Chongqing Lifan
- Fujian Smart Hero
- Guangdong Sunray Cave
- Harbin Yiteng
- Hohhot Dongjin
- Hunan Billows
- Shanghai East Asia
- Shenyang Shenbei
- Shenzhen Ruby
- Tianjin Songjiang
- Wuhan Zall
- Yanbian Baekdu Tigers

=== China League Two & amateur team ===
16 teams from 2012 China League Two, 2011 China Amateur Football League Final stage, Chinese Collegiate Football League and the Vision China Championship were selected to take part in 2012 CFA Cup.

- Guizhou Zhicheng (League Two)
- Dongguan Nancheng (League Two)
- Shandong Youth (League Two)
- Shanghai Zobon (League Two)
- Hebei Zhongji (League Two)
- Guangdong Youth (League Two)
- Shaanxi Laochenggen (League Two)
- Hubei Youth (League Two)
- Dalian Longjuanfeng (Amateur League)
- Changchun Fengyun (Amateur League)
- Wuhan Dongfeng Honda (Amateur League)
- Hebei Yingli (Amateur League)
- Shanxi Jiayi^{1} (League Two/Collegiate League)
- Tongji University (Collegiate League)
- Wuhan Hongxing (Vision China Championship)
- Zibo Sunday (Vision China Championship)

Note 1: Reorganized by Taiyuan University of Technology

== Schedule ==
Round	Date	Matches	Clubs	New entries this round
First round	26–27 May	8	16 → 8	16 2012 China League Two clubs & amateur teams
Second round	1–3 June	12	8 + 16 → 12	16 2012 China League One
Third round	26 June – 4 July	12	12 + 12 → 12	12 2011 Chinese Super League 4th ~ 14th (except Tianjin Teda), 2011 China League One 1st ~ 2nd
Fourth round	17–19 July	8	12 + 4 → 8	4 2011 Chinese FA Cup champions, 2011 Chinese Super League 1st ~ 3rd
Quarter-finals	1 August	4	8 → 4	
Semi-finals	22 August / 26 September	4 (H/A)	4 → 2	
Final	10 / 18 November	2 (H/A)	2 → 1	
Total				48 clubs

== Results ==
- Times listed are UTC+8

=== First round ===
26 May	Guangdong Youth	6–0	Hebei Yingli	Century Lotus Stadium, Foshan
13:00	Cui Ning 18', 71' (pen.); Chen Qi 53', 80'; Chang Feiya 57'; Luo Bixiang 62'

26 May	Hubei Youth	3–0	Changchun Fengyun	Jianghan'erqiao Athlete Training Base, Wuhan
15:00	Li Duanhao 6'; Cai Xinyu 72', 80'

26 May	Shandong Youth	3–4	Wuhan Hongxing	Luneng Taishan Football School, Weifang
15:00	Du Yuxin 5', 46'; Yang Kuo 90'		Huang Lei 15'; Zhang Weijun 60'; Chen Hao 64'; Qi Chongxi 88'

26 May	Guizhou Zhicheng	4–0	Wuhan Dongfeng Honda	Guizhou Provincial Stadium, Guiyang
15:00	Gu Zhongqing 35'; Yang Meiyuan 67'; Ilhamjan Iminjan 71'; Sun Xiaokun 88'

26 May	Hebei Zhongji	2–1	Tongji University	Yutong International Sports Center, Shijiazhuang
15:00	Gao Yunfei 25', 90+2'		Yang Chungang 27'

26 May	Shaanxi Laochenggen	0–0 (4–3 p)	Dalian Longjuanfeng	Shaanxi Province Stadium, Xi'an
16:00
	Penalties
	Fang Jianyu (penalty scored); Xu Xiang (penalty scored); Li Shuai (penalty missed); Qu peng (penalty scored); Liu Yang (penalty scored)		Qi Xiaoguang (penalty missed); Wang Xin (penalty missed); Tang Xiaofei (penalty scored); Guo Xinnan (penalty scored); Li Yuankun (penalty scored)

26 May	Dongguan Nancheng	3–0	Zibo Sunday	Dongguan Nancheng Sports Park, Dongguan
16:00	Zhang Chenlong 21', 26'; Zhang Xingbo 65'

27 May	Shanghai Zobon	3–1	Shanxi Jiayi	Jinshan Sports Centre, Shanghai
15:30	Ji Xiaoxuan 21'; Li Haowen 43'; Hou Junjie 75'		Pei Siyuan 54'

=== Second round ===
1 June	Guangdong Sunray Cave	3–0	Hebei Zhongji	Guangdong Olympic Stadium, Guangzhou
16:00	Zhao Huang 52'; Fan Qunxiao 58', 80'

1 June	Shenzhen Ruby	2–0	Harbin Yiteng	Bao'an Stadium, Shenzhen
17:00	Du longquan 8'; Babacar 87'

2 June	Beijing Baxy	1–2	Beijing 361º	Shijingshan Stadium, Beijing
14:30	Chen Hao-wei 81'		Alonso 8'; Wang Chao 39'

2 June	Shenyang Shenbei	2–0	Shaanxi Laochenggen	Shenyang Sport University Stadium, Shenyang
15:00	Tian Yinong 45'; Chen Xing 87' (pen.)

2 June	Yanbian Baekdu Tigers	2–2 (3–2 p)	Chongqing FC	Hailanjiang Stadium, Longjing
15:00	Han Guanghua 39'; Gao Wanguo 78'		Li Fei 57' (pen.); Guo Mingyue 88'
	Penalties
	Wu Yongchun (penalty missed); Gao Wanguo (penalty scored); Cui Yongzhe (penalty scored); Pei Yuwen (penalty missed); Li Hao (penalty scored)		Li Fei (penalty scored); Shen Longyuan (penalty scored); Ouyang Xue (penalty missed); Du Yu (penalty missed); Meng Wei (penalty missed)

2 June	Hunan Liuyanghe	1–0	Guangdong Youth	Hunan Provincial People's Stadium, Changsha
16:00	Cheng Peng 81'

2 June	Chengdu Blades	1–0	Wuhan Hongxing	Dujiangyan Phoenix Stadium, Dujiangyan
16:00	Yang Hao 29'

2 June	Hohhot Dongjin	2–0	Shanghai Zobon	Hohhot City Stadium, Hohhot
16:00	Zhang Hao 76', 80'

2 June	Chongqing Lifan	2–1	Hubei Youth	Fuling Stadium, Chongqing
19:30	Wang Hongliang 10'; Du Wenxiang 52'		Cai Xinyu 81'

2 June	Tianjin Songjiang	0–1	Dongguan Nancheng	Tianjin Tuanbo Soccer Stadium, Tianjin
19:30			Liao Lisheng 71'	Attendance: 4,933

2 June	Shanghai Tellace	6–0	Fujian Smart Hero	Shanghai Stadium, Shanghai
19:45	Chen Zijie 9'; Mao Jiakang 12' (pen.); Fu Huan 52'; Geng Jiaqi 57'; Arzú 66'; Wang Jiajie 84'

3 June	Wuhan Zall	1–1 (4–5 p)	Guizhou Zhicheng	Xinhua Road Sports Center, Wuhan
15:30	Tan Si 77' (pen.)		Jiang Liang 35'
	Penalties
	Tan Si (penalty missed); Li Gang (penalty scored); Mei Fang (penalty scored); Wang Xiaoshi (penalty scored); Zhu Zisen (penalty scored); Jiang Sheng (penalty missed)		Fan Yunlong (penalty scored); Qu Shaoyan (penalty scored); Gu Zhongqing (penalty scored); Wang Yongxin (penalty missed); Ilhamjan (penalty scored); Wu Yake (penalty scored)

=== Third round ===
26 June	Shanghai Shenxin	2–2 (2–4 p)	Shenyang Shenbei	Jinshan Sports Centre, Shanghai
15:40	Jiang Xiaochen 39'; Zhu Jiawei 48'		Vujović 26'; Liu Le 57'	Attendance: 328
	Penalties
	Antônio Flávio (penalty missed); Jaílton Paraíba (penalty scored); Zhu Jiawei (penalty missed); Zou Zhongting (penalty scored)		(penalty scored) Liu Le; (penalty scored) Zhao Xudong; (penalty scored) Zhao Yibo; (penalty scored) Hao Qiang

26 June	Dalian Shide	8–0	Yanbian Baekdu Tigers	Jinzhou Stadium, Dalian
19:00	Park Dong-Hyuk 21'; Adriano 29', 50', 70', 77' (pen.), 84'; Kamburov 33'; Lü Peng 37'			Attendance: 4,561

26 June	Hangzhou Greentown	3–0	Shanghai Tellace	Yellow Dragon Sports Center, Hangzhou
19:45	Xie Pengfei 8'; Feng Gang 60'; Wang Song 70'			Attendance: 2,032

27 June	Qingdao Jonoon	4–0	Guizhou Zhicheng	Tiantai Stadium, Qingdao
15:30	Sha Yibo 41', 77'; Song Wenjie 47'; Pang Zhiquan 90+3'			Attendance: 2,620

27 June	Dalian Aerbin	2–1	Beijing 361º	Jinzhou Stadium, Dalian
19:00	Hu Zhaojun 34' (pen.); Zhou Tong 42'		Alonso 61'	Attendance: 3,819; Referee: (China) Guo Baolong

27 June	Henan Jianye	2–0	Chongqing Lifan	Hanghai Stadium, Zhengzhou
19:30	Karikari 42'; Katongo 79'			Attendance: 7,012

27 June	Shandong Luneng Taishan	4–0	Dongguan Nancheng	Shandong Provincial Stadium, Jinan
19:30	Yang Chen 21'; Wang Qiang 61'; Lü Zheng 81', 90'			Attendance: 5,206

27 June	Changchun Yatai	2–0	Hohhot Dongjin	Development Area Stadium, Changchun
19:30	Ljubinković 40', 79' (pen.)			Attendance: 2,000

27 June	Jiangsu Sainty	1–1 (4–5 p)	Chengdu Blades	Nanjing Olympic Sports Center, Nanjing
19:40	Ji Xiang 14'		Gao Xiang 70'	Attendance: 10,259; Referee: (China) Tang Kun
	Penalties
	Dănălache (penalty scored); Lu Bofei (penalty scored); Jevtić (penalty scored); Sun Ke (penalty missed); Wang Yunlong (penalty scored); Liu Jianye (penalty missed)		(penalty scored) Valdo; (penalty missed) Wang Cun; (penalty scored) William; (penalty scored) Gao Xiang; (penalty scored) Zhang Bo; (penalty scored) Chen Bo

27 June	Shanghai Shenhua	0–0 (5–4 p)	Shenzhen Ruby	Hongkou Football Stadium, Shanghai
19:45				Attendance: 5,437
	Penalties
	Božić (penalty scored); Dai Lin (penalty scored); Wu Xi (penalty scored); Wang Guanyi (penalty missed); Yu Tao (penalty scored); Cao Yunding (penalty scored)		(penalty scored) Gavanon; (penalty missed) Rakuyama; (penalty scored) Zhang Shichang; (penalty scored) Yu Le; (penalty scored) Babacar; (penalty missed) Ding Haifeng

27 June	Guangzhou R&F	3–2	Hunan Liuyanghe	Yuexiushan Stadium, Guangzhou
20:00	Chen Zhen 2' (o.g.); Davi 61', 66'		Cardozo 35'; Bai Yuexuan 50'	Attendance: 2,205

4 July	Guizhou Moutai	2–0	Guangdong Sunray Cave	Guiyang Olympic Sports Center, Guiyang
19:30	Jordà 43', 52'

=== Fourth round ===
17 July	Hangzhou Greentown	2–1	Chengdu Blades	Jiaxing Stadium, Jiaxing
19:35	Chen Zhongliu 41'; Fabrício 71'		Wang Cun 17'	Attendance: 3,976; Referee: Fan Qi (China)

18 July	Dalian Aerbin	2–0	Shenyang Shenbei	Jinzhou Stadium, Dalian
19:00	Addy 31'; Hu Zhaojun 90+5'			Attendance: 3,891; Referee: Li Jun (China)

18 July	Liaoning Whowin	4–3	Guangzhou R&F	Tiexi New District Sports Center, Shenyang
19:30	Trifunović 14'; Zhao Junzhe 35' (pen.); Yang Xu 76'; Yu Hanchao 89'		Wu Wei'an 7'; Lu Lin 25'; Yakubu 58'	Attendance: 15,327; Referee: Wang Zhe (China)

18 July	Tianjin Teda	1–1 (2–4 p)	Shandong Luneng Taishan	Tianjin Olympic Center Stadium, Tianjin
19:30	Mao Biao 57'		Ortigoza 68'	Attendance: 11,847; Referee: Zhang Zhengping (China)
	Penalties
	Goian (penalty scored); Hu Rentian (penalty missed); Liao Bochao (penalty scored); Wang Xinxin (penalty missed)		(penalty missed) Xia Ningning; (penalty scored) Wang Yongpo; (penalty scored) Antar; (penalty scored) Wu Xinghan; (penalty scored) Pisculichi

18 July	Changchun Yatai	0–0 (5–3 p)	Shanghai Shenhua	Development Area Stadium, Changchun
19:30				Attendance: 21,000; Referee: Wang Jin (China)
	Penalties
	Wang Dong (penalty scored); Marquinhos (penalty scored); Perea (penalty scored); Cao Tianbao (penalty scored); Qu Xiaohui (penalty scored)		(penalty scored) Moreno; (penalty scored) Feng Renliang; (penalty scored) Yan Song; (penalty missed) Yu Tao

18 July	Beijing Guoan	6–0	Qingdao Jonoon	Workers Stadium, Beijing
19:30	Kanouté 3', 35'; Wang Xiaolong 14', 22' (pen.); Guerron 18'; Liu Yangyang 63' (o.g.)			Attendance: 27,526; Referee: Wang Di (China)

18 July	Guangzhou Evergrande	2–1	Henan Jianye	Tianhe Stadium, Guangzhou
19:45	Wu Pingfeng 79'; Li Jianhua 90'		Wang Jia'nan 44'	Attendance: 28,128; Referee: Li Haihe (China)

19 July	Guizhou Moutai	2–0	Dalian Shide	Guiyang Olympic Sports Center, Guiyang
15:30	Yu Hai 71'; Shen Tianfeng 90'			Attendance: 10,011; Referee: Zhong Jun (China)

=== Quarter-finals ===
1 August	Guangzhou Evergrande	1–0	Dalian Aerbin	Tianhe Stadium, Guangzhou
19:00	Cléo 11'			Attendance: 28,686

1 August	Beijing Guoan	3–4	Guizhou Moutai	Workers Stadium, Beijing
19:30	Xu Liang 12', 55'; Guerron 90+2'		Zhang Chenglin 21'; Jordà 25'; Qu Bo 43'; Djulbic 82'	Attendance: 28,668; Referee: Zhong Jun (China)

1 August	Liaoning Whowin	1–0	Hangzhou Greentown	Tiexi New District Sports Center, Shenyang
19:45	Yu Hanchao 27'			Attendance: 18,814

1 August	Shandong Luneng Taishan	1–0	Changchun Yatai	Shandong Provincial Stadium, Jinan
19:45	Wang Yongpo 80' (pen.)			Attendance: 8,297; Referee: Fan Qi (China)

=== Semi-finals ===
==== First leg ====
22 August	Guizhou Moutai	1–1	Shandong Luneng Taishan	Guiyang Olympic Sports Center, Guiyang
19:30	Rubén 1'		Wang Yongpo 56'	Attendance: 21,023; Referee: Prathan Nasa Wang (Thailand)

22 August	Guangzhou Evergrande	1–0	Liaoning Whowin	Tianhe Stadium, Guangzhou
19:35	Zhao Xuri 69'			Attendance: 32,868; Referee: Chaiya Mahapab (Thailand)

==== Second leg ====
26 September	Shandong Luneng Taishan	2–2	Guizhou Moutai	Shandong Provincial Stadium, Jinan
15:30	Wang Yongpo 45'; Simão 62'		Muslimović 49'; Jordà 72'	Referee: Võ Minh Trí (Vietnam)

26 September	Liaoning Whowin	2–2	Guangzhou Evergrande	Tiexi New District Sports Center, Shenyang
19:00	Trifunović 58'; Yang Xu 82'		Zheng Zhi 4'; Jiang Ning 78'	Referee: Choi Dae-Woo (Korea Republic)

=== Final ===
==== First leg ====
10 November
19:30

Guizhou Moutai	1–1	Guangzhou Evergrande
Jordà 10'	Report(in Chinese)	Barrios 49'

Guiyang Olympic Sports Center, Guiyang
Attendance: 45,210
Referee: Alan Milliner (Australia)

Guizhou Moutai	Guangzhou Evergrande

Guizhou:
GK	12	(China) Zhang Lie
RB	17	(China) Sun Jihai	(yellow card) 71'	(substituted off) 75'
CB	3	(China) Zhang Chenglin
CB	7	(Spain) Nano (c)
LB	33	(China) Guo Sheng
RM	15	(China) Chen Jie		(substituted off) 56'
CM	29	(China) Yang Hao
CM	8	(China) Li Chunyu	(yellow card) 37'	(substituted off) 46'
LM	21	(China) Yu Hai
CF	9	(Bosnia and Herzegovina) Zlatan Muslimović	(yellow card) 86'
CF	11	(Spain) Rafa Jordà
Substitutes:
GK	1	(China) Shen Jun
DF	6	(Australia) Dino Djulbic	(yellow card) 84'	(substituted on) 56'
DF	19	(China) Liu Tianqi
DF	30	(China) Liu Qing
DF	31	(China) Rao Weihui	(yellow card) 90+4'	(substituted on) 46'
MF	10	(Spain) Rubén Suárez
FW	25	(China) Li Kai		(substituted on) 75'
Coach:
(China) Gao Hongbo

Guangzhou:
GK	22	(China) Li Shuai
CB	5	(China) Zhang Linpeng
CB	6	(China) Feng Xiaoting
CB	28	(South Korea) Kim Young-Gwon
RWB	4	(China) Rong Hao		(substituted off) 68'
LWB	32	(China) Sun Xiang
DM	37	(China) Zhao Xuri		(substituted off) 77'
DM	10	(China) Zheng Zhi (c)
AM	15	(Argentina) Darío Conca
SS	29	(China) Gao Lin	(yellow card) 80' (yellow-red card) 81'
CF	9	(Brazil) Cléo		(substituted off) 46'
Substitutes:
GK	1	(China) Yang Jun
DF	3	(Brazil) Paulão
DF	14	(China) Li Jianhua
MF	7	(China) Feng Junyan		(substituted on) 68'
MF	26	(China) Wu Pingfeng
MF	42	(China) Huang Bowen		(substituted on) 77'
FW	18	(Paraguay) Lucas Barrios		(substituted on) 46'
Coach:
(Italy) Marcello Lippi

Assistant referees:
Ashley Beecham (Australia)
Nathan MacDonald (Australia)
Fourth official:
Yao Qing

==== Second leg ====
18 November
15:30

Guangzhou Evergrande	4–2	Guizhou Moutai
Barrios 1', 66'; Zhang Linpeng 44'; Conca 90+2'		Jordà 52'; Rao Weihui 90+4'

Tianhe Stadium, Guangzhou
Attendance: 39,989
Referee: Kim Sang-Woo (Korea Republic)

Guangzhou Evergrande	Guizhou Moutai

Guangzhou:
GK	22	(China) Li Shuai
RB	5	(China) Zhang Linpeng
CB	6	(China) Feng Xiaoting
CB	28	(South Korea) Kim Young-Gwon
LB	32	(China) Sun Xiang
DM	37	(China) Zhao Xuri	(yellow card) 38'	(substituted off) 78'
DM	8	(China) Qin Sheng	(yellow card) 32'
DM	10	(China) Zheng Zhi (c)
AM	15	(Argentina) Darío Conca	(yellow card) 76'
AM	11	(Brazil) Muriqui		(substituted off) 54'
CF	18	(Paraguay) Lucas Barrios		(substituted off) 88'
Substitutes:
GK	1	(China) Yang Jun
DF	4	(China) Rong Hao		(substituted on) 78'
DF	14	(China) Li Jianhua
MF	7	(China) Feng Junyan		(substituted on) 88'
MF	42	(China) Huang Bowen
FW	9	(Brazil) Cléo		(substituted on) 54'
FW	21	(China) Jiang Ning
Coach:
(Italy) Marcello Lippi

Guizhou:
GK	12	(China) Zhang Lie
RB	17	(China) Sun Jihai	(yellow card) 64'
CB	3	(China) Zhang Chenglin
CB	7	(Spain) Nano (c)	(yellow card) 33'	(substituted off) 56'
LB	33	(China) Guo Sheng	(yellow card) 39'	(substituted off) 46'
RM	6	(Australia) Dino Djulbic	(yellow card) 71'
CM	15	(China) Chen Jie	(yellow card) 19'
CM	29	(China) Yang Hao
LM	21	(China) Yu Hai		(substituted off) 71'
CF	9	(Bosnia and Herzegovina) Zlatan Muslimović
CF	11	(Spain) Rafa Jordà	(yellow card) 88'
Substitutes:
GK	1	(China) Shen Jun
DF	19	(China) Liu Tianqi
DF	30	(China) Liu Qing
DF	31	(China) Rao Weihui		(substituted on) 46'
MF	10	(Spain) Rubén Suárez		(substituted on) 56'
MF	14	(China) Yang Yihu		(substituted on) 71'
FW	25	(China) Li Kai
Coach:
(China) Gao Hongbo

Assistant referees:
Kim Sung-Il (Korea Republic)
Ji Seung-Min (Korea Republic)
Fourth official:
Wang Di

== Awards ==
- Top Scorer: (Spain) Rafa Jordà (Guizhou Renhe)
- Most Valuable Player: (Paraguay) Lucas Barrios (Guangzhou Evergrande)
- Fair Play Award: Shandong Luneng Taishan
- Best Manager: (Italy) Marcello Lippi (Guangzhou Evergrande)

== Goal scorers ==
6 goals

- (Spain) Rafa Jordà (Guizhou Moutai)

5 goals

- (Brazil) Adriano (Dalian Shide)

3 goals

- (Paraguay) Lucas Barrios (Guangzhou Evergrande)
- (China) Cai Xinyu (Hubei Youth)
- (China) Wang Yongpo (Shandong Luneng)

2 goals

- (Uruguay) Matías Alonso (Beijing BIT)
- (Ecuador) Joffre Guerrón (Beijing Guoan)
- (Mali) Frédéric Kanouté (Beijing Guoan)
- (China) Xu Liang (Beijing Guoan)
- (China) Wang Xiaolong (Beijing Guoan)
- (Serbia) Marko Ljubinković (Changchun Yatai)
- (China) Hu Zhaojun (Dalian Aerbin)
- (China) Zhang Chenlong (Dongguan Nancheng)
- (China) Fan Qunxiao (Guangdong Sunray Cave)
- (China) Chen Qi (Guangdong Youth)
- (China) Cui Ning (Guangdong Youth)
- (Brazil) Davi (Guangzhou R&F)
- (China) Gao Yunfei (Hebei Zhongji)
- (Serbia) Miloš Trifunović (Liaoning Whowin)
- (China) Yang Xu (Liaoning Whowin)
- (China) Yu Hanchao (Liaoning Whowin)
- (China) Sha Yibo (Qingdao Jonoon)
- (China) Zhang Hao (Hohhot Dongjin)
- (China) Lü Zheng (Shandong Luneng)
- (China) Du Yuxin (Shandong Youth)

1 goal

- (Chinese Taipei) Chen Hao-wei (Beijing Baxy)
- (China) Wang Chao (Beijing BIT)
- (China) Gao Xiang (Chengdu Blades)
- (China) Wang Cun (Chengdu Blades)
- (China) Yang Hao (Chengdu Blades)
- (China) Guo Mingyue (Chongqing F.C.)
- (China) Li Fei (Chongqing F.C.)
- (China) Du Wenxiang (Chongqing Lifan)
- (China) Wang Hongliang (Chongqing Lifan)
- (Ghana) Lee Addy (Dalian Aerbin)
- (China) Zhou Tong (Dalian Aerbin)
- (Bulgaria) Martin Kamburov (Dalian Shide)
- (China) Lü Peng (Dalian Shide)
- (South Korea) Park Dong-Hyuk (Dalian Shide)
- (China) Liao Lisheng (Dongguan Nancheng)
- (China) Zhang Xingbo (Dongguan Nancheng)
- (China) Zhao Huang (Guangdong Sunray Cave)
- (China) Chang Feiya (Guangdong Youth)
- (China) Luo Boxing (Guangdong Youth)
- (Brazil) Cléo (Guangzhou Evergrande)
- (Argentina) Darío Conca (Guangzhou Evergrande)
- (China) Jiang Ning (Guangzhou Evergrande)
- (China) Li Jianhua (Guangzhou Evergrande)
- (China) Wu Pingfeng (Guangzhou Evergrande)
- (China) Zhang Linpeng (Guangzhou Evergrande)
- (China) Zhao Xuri (Guangzhou Evergrande)
- (China) Zheng Zhi (Guangzhou Evergrande)
- (Nigeria) Yakubu (Guangzhou R&F)
- (China) Lu Lin (Guangzhou R&F)
- (China) Wu Wei'an (Guangzhou R&F)
- (Australia) Dino Djulbic (Guizhou Moutai)
- (Bosnia and Herzegovina) Zlatan Muslimović (Guizhou Moutai)
- (China) Qu Bo (Guizhou Moutai)
- (China) Rao Weihui (Guizhou Moutai)
- (China) Shen Tianfeng (Guizhou Moutai)
- (Spain) Rubén Suárez (Guizhou Moutai)
- (China) Yu Hai (Guizhou Moutai)
- (China) Zhang Chenglin (Guizhou Moutai)
- (China) Gu Zhongqing (Guizhou Zhicheng)
- (China) Ilhamjan Iminjan (Guizhou Zhicheng)
- (China) Jiang Liang (Guizhou Zhicheng)
- (China) Sun Xiaokun (Guizhou Zhicheng)
- (China) Yang Meiyuan (Guizhou Zhicheng)
- (China) Chen Zhongliu (Hangzhou Greentown)
- (Brazil) Fabrício (Hangzhou Greentown)
- (China) Feng Gang (Hangzhou Greentown)
- (China) Xie Pengfei (Hangzhou Greentown)
- (China) Wang Song (Hangzhou Greentown)
- (Hong Kong) Godfred Karikari (Henan Jianye)
- (Zambia) Christopher Katongo (Henan Jianye)
- (China) Wang Jia'nan (Henan Jianye)
- (China) Li Duanhao (Hubei Youth)
- (China) Bai Yuexuan (Hunan Liuyanghe)
- (Uruguay) Claudio Cardozo (Hunan Liuyanghe)
- (China) Cheng Peng (Hunan Liuyanghe)
- (China) Ji Xiang (Jiangsu Sainty)
- (China) Zhao Junzhe (Liaoning Whowin)
- (China) Pang Zhiquan (Qingdao Jonoon)
- (China) Song Wenjie (Qingdao Jonoon)
- (Paraguay) José Ortigoza (Shandong Luneng)
- (Mozambique) Simão (Shandong Luneng)
- (China) Wang Qiang (Shandong Luneng)
- (China) Yang Chen (Shandong Luneng)
- (China) Yang Kuo (Shandong Youth)
- (China) Jiang Xiaochen (Shanghai Shenxin)
- (China) Zhu Jiawei (Shanghai Shenxin)
- (Honduras) Samir Arzú (Shanghai Tellace)
- (China) Chen Zijie (Shanghai Tellace)
- (China) Fu Huan (Shanghai Tellace)
- (China) Geng Jiaqi (Shanghai Tellace)
- (China) Mao Jiakang (Shanghai Tellace)
- (China) Wang Jiajie (Shanghai Tellace)
- (China) Hou Junjie (Shanghai Zobon)
- (China) Ji Xiaoxuan (Shanghai Zobon)
- (China) Li Haowen (Shanghai Zobon)
- (China) Pei Siyuan (Shanxi Jiayi)
- (China) Chen Xing (Shenyang Shenbei)
- (China) Liu Le (Shenyang Shenbei)
- (China) Tian Yinong (Shenyang Shenbei)
- (Montenegro) Vladimir Vujović (Shenyang Shenbei)
- (China) Du longquan (Shenzhen Ruby)
- (Senegal) Babacar Gueye (Shenzhen Ruby)
- (China) Mao Biao (Tianjin Teda)
- (China) Yang Chungang (Tongji University)
- (China) Chen Hao (Wuhan Hongxing)
- (China) Huang Lei (Wuhan Hongxing)
- (China) Qi Chongxi (Wuhan Hongxing)
- (China) Zhang Weijun (Wuhan Hongxing)
- (China) Tan Si (Wuhan Zall)
- (China) Gao Wanguo (Yanbian Baekdu Tigers)
- (China) Han Guanghua (Yanbian Baekdu Tigers)

Own goals

- Scored for Beijing Guoan (1): (China) Liu Yangyang (Qingdao Jonoon)
- Scored for Guangzhou R&F (1): (China) Chen Zhen (Hunan Liuyanghe)
