= 2012 Henan Jianye F.C. season =

Henan Jianye F.C.
- Chairman: Hu Baosen
- Manager: Jan Versleijen
- Super League: 16th (Relegated)
- FA Cup: –
Home colours	Away colours

The 2012 Henan Jianye F.C. season was Henan's 6th consecutive season in the Chinese Super League. Henan also competed in the Chinese FA Cup.

== Competitions ==
=== Chinese Super League ===
==== League table ====
Pos	Team	Pld	W	D	L	GF	GA	GD	Pts	Qualification or relegation
12	Shandong Luneng	30	8	12	10	46	43	+3	36 (Note: Liaoning, 10pts; Hangzhou, 9pts; Shandong, 6pts, GF=4, GA=5; Qingdao, 6pts, GF=4, GA=5)	
13	Qingdao Jonoon	30	10	6	14	26	34	−8	36	
14	Dalian Shide (D, R)	30	8	10	12	39	49	−10	34	Disbanded after season (Note: On 30 November 2012, Dalian Shide were acquisited by Aerbin Group and merged into Dalian Aerbin after their owner was arrested.)
15	Shanghai Shenxin	30	6	12	12	36	35	+1	30	
16	Henan Jianye (R)	30	7	5	18	28	56	−28	26	Relegation to China League One

Source: Chinese Super League (in Chinese)
Rules for classification: 1) points; 2) goal difference; 3) number of goals scored; 4) head-to-head goals scored; 5) goal difference; 6) goals scored; 7) disciplinary points (1 point for each yellow card, 3 points for each red card). Head-to-Head: Only used at the end of the season when two or more teams need the head-to-head rules to break a tie.
(D) Disqualified; (R) Relegated

==== Matches ====
10 March 2012 1	Liaoning Whowin	3–1	Henan Jianye	Shenyang Tiexi Stadium
Saturday 14:30	Zhao Junzhe 58' (pen.); Grozdanovski 63'; Yu Hanchao 68'	Report	88' Netto	Attendance: 15,311; Referee: Huang Yejun

17 March 2012 2	Henan Jianye	0–4	Shanghai Shenxin	Zhengzhou Hanghai Stadium
Saturday		Report	60', 76' Jailton Paraíba; 69' Antônio Flávio; 83' Jonas Salley	Attendance: 20,358; Referee: Shi Zhenlu

25 March 2012 3	Guangzhou Evergrande	3–0	Henan Jianye	Tianhe Stadium
Sunday	Muriqui 31', 77'; Wu Pingfeng 86'	Report

2 April 2012 4	Guizhou Renhe	1–2	Henan Jianye	Guiyang Olympic Sports Center
Monday	Rafa Jordá 11'	Report	69', 82' C. Katongo	Attendance: 42241; Referee: Zhang Zhengping

7 April 2012 5	Henan Jianye	2–1	Changchun Yatai	Zhengzhou Hanghai Stadium
Saturday	Leandro Netto (yellow card) 48' (yellow-red card) 90'; Hajri (yellow card) 56'; Katongo 60', 85'	Report	Wenzhao (yellow card) 35'; Ljubinković 51'	Attendance: 19,176; Referee: (China) Hai Tan

14 April 2012 6	Dalian Aerbin	1–0	Henan Jianye	Jinzhou Stadium
20:00	Canales 90+6' (pen.)	Report	Zhang Li (yellow card) 37'; Katongo (yellow card) 44' (yellow-red card) 75'; Peng (yellow card) 90'	Attendance: 12,981; Referee: (China) Wu Chaojue

21 April 2012 7	Henan Jianye	1–0	Qingdao Jonoon	Zhengzhou Hanghai Stadium
20:30	Leandro Netto 66'; Hajri (yellow card) 90'	Report	Yao Jiangshan (yellow card) 22'; Melkam (yellow card) 90'	Attendance: 18,699; Referee: (China) Fu Ming

28 April 2012 8	Jiangsu Sainty	5–1	Henan Jianye	Nanjing Olympic Sports Center
Saturday	Jevtić 2'; Dănălache 36', 45+1', 58'; Lu Bofei 51'	Report	Zhao Peng (yellow card) 38'; Xu Yang 70'	Attendance: 26,872; Referee: (China) Ma Li

6 May 2012 9	Henan Jianye	2–2	Beijing Guoan	Zhengzhou Hanghai Stadium
20:30	Lu Feng 17', 63' (yellow card) 43'; Zhang Lu (yellow card) 22'; Gu Cao (yellow card) 66'; Zi Long (yellow card) 82'	Report	Zhang Xizhe 55'; Reinaldo 79'; Xu Liang (yellow card) 89'	Attendance: 20,192; Referee: (Australia) Rodney Allen

13 May 2012 10	Guangzhou R&F	2–1	Henan Jianye	Yuexiushan Stadium
18:45	Rafael Coelho 23'; Gao Zengxiang (yellow card) 24'; Xu Bo (yellow card) 33'; Davi 44'; Liu Cheng (yellow card) 57'	Report	Huang Xiyang (yellow card) 53'; Bi Jinhao 63'; Zhang Li (yellow card) 66'	Attendance: 4,831; Referee: (China) Fan Qi

19 May 2012 11	Henan Jianye	1–0	Shanghai Shenhua	Zhengzhou Hanghai Stadium
Saturday	Katongo 56'; Qiao Wei (yellow card) 90+5'	Report	Fan Lingjiang (yellow card) 11'; Anelka (yellow card) 90'; Božić (yellow card) 90+5'	Attendance: 22,180; Referee: (China) Wang Zhe

27 May 2012 12	Hangzhou Greentown	2–0	Henan Jianye	Yellow Dragon Stadium
20:35	Renatinho 38' (pen.); Fabrício 65'; Fan Xiaodong (yellow card) 89'	Report	Huang Xiyang (yellow card) 38'; Bi Jinhao (yellow card) 69'; Tan Wangsong (yellow card) 80'; Gu Cao (yellow card) 90'	Attendance: 12,752; Referee: (China) Tao Rancheng

16 June 2012 13	Henan Jianye	0–2	Tianjin Teda	Zhengzhou Hanghai Stadium
20:30		Report	Ars 27'; He Yang (yellow card) 29'; Wang Xinxin 57'	Attendance: 17,473; Referee: (China) Yao Qing

23 June 2012 14	Dalian Shide	0–0	Henan Jianye	Jinzhou Stadium
20:00	Zhao Honglüe (yellow card) 51'; Lü Peng (yellow card) 77'; Kamburov (yellow card) 90'	Report	Tan Wangsong (yellow card) 12'; Lu Feng (yellow card) 54'; Zhang Lu (yellow card) 64'	Attendance: 10,581; Referee: (China) Fu Ming

7 July 2012 15	Henan Jianye	1–1	Liaoning Whowin	Zhengzhou Hanghai Stadium
20:45	Zhao Peng (yellow card) 25'; Katongo 70'; Qiao Wei (yellow card) 80'; Tan Wangsong (yellow card) 90'	Report	Yang Shanping (yellow card) 45'; Yang Xu (yellow card) 74'; Kim Yoo-Jin 85'

15 July 2012 16	Shanghai Shenxin	2–0	Henan Jianye	Jinshan Sports Centre
20:45	Anselmo 45+1'; Antônio Flávio 58'	Report	Li Zhaonan (yellow card) 16'; Katongo (yellow card) 70'; Zhang Ke (yellow card) 84'	Attendance: 12,870; Referee: (China) Li Haihe

21 July 2012 17	Henan Jianye	1–2	Guangzhou Evergrande	Zhengzhou Hanghai Stadium
20:45	Tan Wangsong (yellow card) 7'; Xu Yang 28'	Report	Zhao Xuri 8'; Barrios 64'; Cléo (yellow card) 74'; Zheng Zhi (yellow card) 85'	Attendance: 24,086; Referee: (China) Shi Zhenlu

28 July 2012 18	Henan Jianye	3–1	Guizhou Renhe	Zhengzhou Hanghai Stadium
20:45	Leandro Netto 14', 60'; Zhao Peng 39'	Summary	Zhang Chenglin (yellow card) 23'; Sun Jihai (yellow card) 30'; Rubén Suárez 90+2' (pen.)	Attendance: 17,212; Referee: (China) Hai Tan

4 August 2012 19	Changchun Yatai	2–2	Henan Jianye	Development Area Stadium
20:35	Marquinhos 10'; Kássio (yellow card) 15'; Zhang Wenzhao 21'	Summary	He Bin (yellow card) 29'; Chansa 33'; Xu Yang 64'; Karikari (yellow card) 88'	Attendance: 10,985; Referee: (China) Fan Qi

11 August 2012 20	Henan Jianye	1–2	Dalian Aerbin	Zhengzhou Hanghai Stadium
20:45	Chansa (yellow card) 66'; Leandro Netto 88'	Summary	Utaka 41' (yellow card) 62'; Jin Pengxiang (yellow card) 47'; Wang Jun (yellow card) 57'; Yu Dabao (yellow card) 69'; Zhou Tong 84'	Attendance: 19,559; Referee: (China) Wang Di

19 August 2012 21	Qingdao Jonoon	3–1	Henan Jianye	Qingdao Tiantai Stadium
16:30	Melkam (yellow card) 18'; Zou Zheng 27'; Bruno Meneghel 78', 90+3'	Summary	Son Seung-Joon (yellow card) 5'; Zhao Peng (yellow card) 25'; Chansa 44'; Adaílton (yellow card) 46'; Xiao Zhi (yellow card) 46'; Tan Wangsong (yellow card) 48'; He Bin (red card) 87'	Attendance: 8,673; Referee: (Thailand) Chaiya Mahapab

25 August 2012 22	Henan Jianye	0–3	Jiangsu Sainty	Zhengzhou Hanghai Stadium
20:45		Summary	Jevtić 13'; Jiang Jiajun (yellow card) 37'; Dănălache 84', 90'	Attendance: 14,528; Referee: (Japan) Yudai Yamamoto

1 September 2012 23	Henan Jianye	2–1	Shandong Luneng Taishan	Zhengzhou Hanghai Stadium
20:45	Katongo 48' (pen.); Zhang Ke (yellow card) 65'; Adaílton (yellow card) 81'; Zhang Li 88' (yellow card) 89'	Summary	Wang Tong (yellow card) 43'; Ortigoza (yellow card) 72'; Yuan Weiwei (yellow card) 83'

22 September 2012 25	Henan Jianye	3–1	Guangzhou R&F	Zhengzhou Hanghai Stadium
20:45	Chansa (yellow card) 27'; Adaílton (yellow card) 28'; Sui Donglu 53' (o.g.); Wang Jia'nan (yellow card) 80'; Zhang Lu 84'; Katongo 89'	Summary	Rafael Coelho 21'; Griffiths (yellow card) 38'; Liu Cheng (yellow card) 82'

28 September 2012 26	Shanghai Shenhua	2–1	Henan Jianye	Hongkou Football Stadium
21:00	Drogba 13'; Cao Yunding 71'	Summary	Tan Wangsong (yellow card) 25'; Qiao Wei (yellow card) 47'; Zhang Li 55'; Chansa (yellow card) 90+3'	Referee: (China) Fan Qi

3 October 2012 24	Beijing Guoan	3–0	Henan Jianye	Workers Stadium
20:30	Shao Jiayi 25', 70' (yellow card) 68'; Zhang Xizhe 63'	Summary	Zhang Li (yellow card) 24' (yellow-red card) 85'; Son Seung-Joon (yellow card) 33'

7 October 2012 27	Henan Jianye	1–3	Hangzhou Greentown	Zhengzhou Hanghai Stadium
20:00	Lu Feng (yellow card) 35'; Katongo 71'; Tan Wangsong (yellow card) 78'; Huang Xiyang (yellow card) 89'	Summary	Mazola (yellow card) 5'; Cao Xuan 12'; Renatinho 34'; Wang Song 88' (pen.); Jiang Bo (yellow card) 90+3'

20 October 2012 28	Tianjin Teda	–	Henan Jianye	TEDA Football Stadium
20:30

27 October 2012 29	Henan Jianye	–	Dalian Shide	Zhengzhou Hanghai Stadium
16:30

3 November 2012 30	Shandong Luneng Taishan	–	Henan Jianye	Shandong Provincial Stadium
15:30

=== Chinese FA Cup ===
27 June 2012 3	Henan Jianye	2–0	Chongqing Lifan	Zhengzhou
20:30		Report		Stadium: Zhengzhou Hanghai Stadium

18 July 2012 4	Guangzhou Evergrande	2–1	Henan Jianye	Guangzhou
20:45	Wu Pingfeng 80'; Li Jianhua 90'	Report	Wang Jia'nan 44'	Stadium: Tianhe Stadium
