= 2011 Tianjin Teda F.C. season =

Tianjin Teda F.C.
- Super League: 10
- FA Cup: Champions
- AFC Champions League: Round of 16
Home colours	Away colours

The 2011 Tianjin Teda F.C. season involved Tianjin competing in the Chinese Super League, Chinese FA Cup, and AFC Champions League. Tianjin qualified for the AFC Champions League after finishing runners-up the 2010 Chinese Super League.

== Competitions ==
=== Chinese FA Cup ===
21 September 2011 Quarter-finals	Tianjin TEDA	2 - 0	Shaanxi Renhe	TEDA Stadium, Tianjin
19:30	Wang Xinxin 32'; Hu Rentian 35'

19 October 2011 Semi-finals	Tianjin TEDA	2 - 0	Shanghai Shenhua	TEDA Stadium, Tianjin
19:30	Bai Yuefeng 65'; Wang Xinxin 89'			Referee: (South Korea) Kim Jong-Hyeok

19 November 2011 Final	Shandong Luneng Taishan	1 – 2	Tianjin Teda	Olympic Sports Center, Hefei
16:00	Han Peng 3'		Wang Xinxin 12'; Yu Dabao 63'	Attendance: 19,813; Referee: (Japan) Yudai Yamamoto

=== AFC Champions League ===
==== Group stage ====
Group E
Team	Pld	W	D	L	GF	GA	GD	Pts
(Japan) Gamba Osaka	6	3	1	2	13	7	+6	10
(China) Tianjin Teda	6	3	1	2	8	6	+2	10
(South Korea) Jeju United	6	2	1	3	6	10	−4	7
(Australia) Melbourne Victory	6	1	3	2	7	11	−4	6

Tiebreakers

- Gamba Osaka and Tianjin Teda are ranked by their head-to-head records, as shown below.

Team	Pld	W	D	L	GF	GA	GD	Pts
(Japan) Gamba Osaka	2	1	0	1	3	2	+1	3
(China) Tianjin Teda	2	1	0	1	2	3	−1	3

1 March 2011 Group stage	Jeju United (South Korea)	0 – 1	(China) Tianjin Teda	Jeju World Cup Stadium, Jeju
15:00 UTC+09:00		Report	Yu Dabao 55'	Attendance: 5,245; Referee: Abdullah Al Hilali (Oman)

15 March 2011 Group stage	Tianjin Teda (China)	2 – 1	(Japan) Gamba Osaka	TEDA Football Stadium, Tianjin
19:30 UTC+08:00	Chen Tao 25'; Cao Yang 53' (pen.)	Report	Lee Keun-Ho 31'	Attendance: 26,866; Referee: Abdullah Balideh (Qatar)

5 April 2011 Group stage	Tianjin Teda (China)	1 – 1	(Australia) Melbourne Victory	TEDA Football Stadium, Tianjin
19:30 UTC+08:00	Zorić 19'	Report	Muscat 52'	Attendance: 25,456; Referee: Valentin Kovalenko (Uzbekistan)

20 April 2011 Group stage	Melbourne Victory (Australia)	2 – 1	(China) Tianjin Teda	Docklands Stadium, Melbourne
19:30 UTC+10:00	Hernández 44'; Muscat 45+1' (pen.)	Report	Chen Tao 37'	Attendance: 5,693; Referee: Alireza Faghani (Iran)

4 May 2011 Group stage	Tianjin Teda (China)	3 – 0	(South Korea) Jeju United	TEDA Football Stadium, Tianjin
19:30 UTC+08:00	Olguín 8'; Wu Weian 21'; Cao Yang 72' (pen.)	Report		Attendance: 26,683; Referee: Mohamed Al Zarooni (UAE)

11 May 2011 Group stage	Gamba Osaka (Japan)	2 – 0	(China) Tianjin Teda	Osaka Expo '70 Stadium, Suita
19:00 UTC+09:00	Endo 74'; Usami 90+4' (pen.)	Report		Attendance: 7,939; Referee: Saeid Mozaffarizadeh (Iran)

==== Knock-out stage ====
24 May 2011 Round of 16	Jeonbuk Hyundai Motors (South Korea)	3 – 0	(China) Tianjin Teda	Jeonju World Cup Stadium, Jeonju
19:00 UTC+09:00	Eninho 32', 84'; Lee Seung-Hyun 43'	Report		Attendance: 5,254; Referee: Ali Al Badwawi (UAE)
