= 2011 Chinese FA Cup =

Tournament details
- Country: China
- Teams: 30

Final positions
- Champions: Tianjin Teda (1st title)
- Runners-up: Shandong Luneng
- Champions League: Tianjin TEDA

Tournament statistics
- Matches played: 29
- Goals scored: 65 (2.24 per match)
- Top goal scorer(s): (Brazil) Muriqui (4 goals)

Awards
- Best player: (China) Yu Dabao

The TOSHIBA 2011 Chinese FA Cup (Chinese: 东芝2011中国足球协会杯) was the 13th edition of Chinese FA Cup.

The match of first round began on 4 May 2011, and the final took place on 19 November 2011. Tianjin Teda won the title for the first time and earned a berth in the 2012 AFC Champions League.

The cup title sponsor is Japanese company Toshiba. A three-year deal was announced on 8 April 2011.

== Schedule ==
Round	Date	Matches	Clubs	New entries this round
First round	4 May 2011	10	20 → 10	6 2011 Chinese Super League teams (addition to 2010 Chinese Super League 1st ~ 10th); 14 2011 China League One teams
Second round	11 or 12 May 2011	8	10 + 6 → 8	6 2010 Chinese Super League 5th ~ 10th
Third round	25 or 26 May 2011	4	8 → 4	
Quarter-finals	21 September 2011	4	4 + 4 → 4	4 2010 Chinese Super League 1st ~ 4th
Semi-finals	19 October 2011	2	4 → 2	
Final	19 November 2011	1	2 → 1	
Total				30 clubs

== Participants ==
=== Chinese Super League ===
Four of 2010 Chinese Super League teams are entered in Quarter-finals, Six of them are entered in Second round, Six of them are entered in First round, respectively. Total 16 teams took part in 2011 CFA Cup.

- Shandong Luneng Taishan (final)
- Tianjin TEDA (winner)
- Shanghai Shenhua (semi-finals)
- Hangzhou Greentown (quarter-finals)
- Beijing Guoan (semi-finals)
- Dalian Shide (second round)
- Liaoning Whowin (third round)
- Henan Jianye (quarter-finals)
- Changchun Yatai (third round)
- Shaanxi Renhe (quarter-finals)
- Jiangsu Sainty (first round)
- Shenzhen (first round)
- Nanchang Hengyuan (third round)
- Qingdao Jonoon (first round)
- Guangzhou Evergrande (second round)
- Chengdu Blades (first round)

=== China League One ===
All of China League One teams are entered in First round. Total 14 teams took part in 2011 CFA Cup.

- Chongqing Lifan (second round)
- Guangzhou R&F (second round)
- Yanbian Changbai Tiger (quarter-finals)
- Shanghai East Asia (second round)
- Hubei Wuhan Zhongbo (first round)
- Hunan Billows Baishijiao (first round)
- Shenyang Dongjin Shidai (first round)
- Beijing Baxy (first round)
- Shenyang Shenbei (second round)
- Guizhou Zhicheng (first round)
- Guangdong Sunray Cave (third round)
- Beijing 361 Degrees (first round)
- Dalian Aerbin (second round)
- Tianjin Songjiang (second round)

== Results ==
In each matchup, the one with a higher rank last season will be the home team.

The ties are single matches, with a penalty shootout if necessary but no extra time, with the winners progressing to the next round.

=== First round ===
4 May 2011	Chengdu Blades	0–0 (5–6 p)	Tianjin Runyulong	Chengdu Sports Centre, Chengdu
15:30
	Penalties
	Li Gang (penalty scored); Feng Zhuoyi (penalty missed) (penalty scored) (penalty scored); Song Zhenyu (penalty missed) (penalty scored) (penalty scored); Hui Jiakang (penalty missed)		(penalty scored) Hua Bo; (penalty scored) Yang Junjie; (penalty missed) Cui Zhongkai; (penalty scored) Liu Le; (penalty missed) Zhao Ming (penalty scored) (penalty scored) (penalty scored)

4 May 2011	Chongqing Lifan	3–0	Beijing Baxy	Fuling Stadium, Fuling
19:30	Wang Weicheng 10'; Liu Zhongyi 74'; Zhang Chiming 87'

5 May 2011	Shanghai East Asia	2–0	Hubei Wuhan Zhongbo	Yuanshen Stadium, Shanghai
20:00	Wang Shenchao 3'; Lü Wenjun 60'

4 May 2011	Nanchang Hengyuan	3–1	Beijing 361 Degrees	Nanchang Bayi Stadium, Nanchang
15:40	Yang Chen 26', 78'; Liu Yintao 46'		Li Kuanglun 62'

4 May 2011	Shenzhen	0–3	Dalian Aerbin	Huizhou Olympic Stadium, Huizhou
19:30			Woodly 8' 25'; Sun Bo 82'

4 May 2011	Guangzhou Evergrande	3–2	Guizhou Zhicheng	Yuexiushan Stadium, Guangzhou
19:30	Muriqui 62' 64' (pen.) 78'		Wang Lichun 4'; Mauro 90'

5 May 2011	Shenzhen Phoenix	3–0	Shenyang Dongjin Shidai	Dongguan Stadium, Dongguan
15:30	Beto 6'; Wen Chao 24'; Liang Yanfeng 67'

4 May 2011	Yanbian Baekdu Tigers	1–0	Hunan Billows Baishijiao	Yanji People's Stadium, Yanji
15:30	Xu Bo 31'

4 May 2011	Qingdao Jonoon	1–1 (5–6 p)	Guangdong Sunray Cave	Qingdao Tiantai Stadium, Qingdao
15:30	Xu Jingjie 25'		Yin Hongbo 72'
	Penalties
	Zhu Shiyu (penalty scored); Xu Jingjie (penalty scored); Zhu Jianrong (penalty scored); Sha Yibo (penalty scored); Hu Jun (penalty scored); Sun Jiangshan (penalty missed)		(penalty scored) Yin Hongbo; (penalty scored) Yu Jianfeng; (penalty scored) Shi Liang; (penalty scored) Steer; (penalty scored) Delgado; (penalty scored) Pan Jia

4 May 2011	Jiangsu Sainty	0–0 (3–4 p)	Tianjin Songjiang	Olympic Sports Center, Nanjing
19:30
	Penalties
	(penalty scored) (penalty scored); Liu Jianye (penalty missed) (penalty scored) de la Haza (penalty missed)		(penalty missed) Rodić (penalty scored) (penalty scored) (penalty scored); (penalty scored) Zhang Cheng

=== Second round ===
11 May 2011	Changchun Yatai	4–0	Tianjin Runyulong	Jingkai Stadium, Changchun
15:30	Zhang Wenzhao 1'; Nei 46'; Wang Dong 75'; Du Zhenyu 90+2'

11 May 2011	Henan Jianye	1–1 (3–1 p)	Chongqing Lifan	Hanghai Stadium. Zhengzhou
19:30	Leandro Netto 74'		Xu Xiaobo 71'
	Penalties
	Fabão (penalty scored); Lu Feng (penalty scored); Zhang Li (penalty scored)		(penalty missed) Raí; (penalty missed) Li Xiangbin; (penalty scored) Xu Xiaobo; (penalty missed) Zhou Heng

11 May 2011	Beijing Guoan	1–0	Shanghai East Asia	Workers Stadium, Beijing
19:30	Zhang Xizhe 58'			Referee: (China) Ma Ning

11 May 2011	Nanchang Hengyuan	2–0	Dalian Aerbin	Nanchang Bayi Stadium, Nanchang
15:30	Yang Chen 30'; Jiang Zhipeng 62'

12 May 2011	Shaanxi Renhe	1–1 (11–10 p)	Guangzhou Evergrande	Shaanxi Province Stadium, Xi'an
15:30	Yu Hai 68'		Muriqui 45' (pen.)
	Penalties
	Fabio Firmani (penalty scored); Qu Bo (penalty missed); Sun Jihai (penalty scored); Tomáš Oravec (penalty scored); Zhao Xuri (penalty scored); Yu Hai (penalty scored); Rao Weihui (penalty scored); Miloš Bajalica (penalty missed); Dino Djulbic (penalty scored); Wan Houliang (penalty scored); Zhang Lie (penalty scored); Fabio Firmani (penalty scored); Qu Bo (penalty scored)		(penalty missed) Muriqui; (penalty scored) Gao Lin; (penalty scored) Feng Xiaoting; (penalty scored) Jiang Ning; (penalty scored) Zheng Zhi; (penalty scored) Sun Xiang; (penalty scored) Paulão; (penalty missed) Wu Pingfeng; (penalty scored) Li Jianhua; (penalty scored) Cho Won-Hee; (penalty scored) Yang Jun; (penalty scored) Muriqui; (penalty missed) Gao Lin

11 May 2011	Liaoning Whowin	1–0	Shenzhen Phoenix	Tiexi Sports Center, Shenyang
15:30	Xing Xufei 50'

11 May 2011	Dalian Shide	1–2	Yanbian Baekdu Tigers	Jinzhou Stadium, Dalian
15:30	Wang Xuanhong 62'		Gao Wanguo 48' 90' (pen.)

11 May 2011	Guangdong Sunray Cave	1–0	Tianjin Songjiang	People's Stadium, Guangzhou
19:30	Yin Hongbo 46' (pen.)

=== Third Round ===
25 May 2011	Henan Jianye	2–0	Changchun Yatai	Hanghai Stadium. Zhengzhou
19:30	Netto 9'; Zhang Lu 65'

25 May 2011	Beijing Guoan	6–1	Nanchang Hengyuan	Workers Stadium, Beijing
19:30	Wang Xiaolong 18' (pen.); Joel Griffiths 19' 25'; Xu Liang 30'; Roberto 59'; Darko Matić 81' (pen.)		Ji Jun 68'	Referee: (China) Wang Jin

26 May 2011	Liaoning Whowin	0–1	Shaanxi Renhe	Tiexi Sports Center, Shenyang
15:30			Zhu Jiawei 72'

25 May 2011	Yanbian Baekdu Tigers	1–1 (2–1 p)	Guangdong Sunray Cave	People's Stadium, Yanji
15:30	Gao Wanguo 23'		Tan Binliang 58'
	Penalties
	Pei Yuwen (penalty scored); Chi Zhongguo (penalty missed); Bai Shenghu (penalty missed); Han Qingsong (penalty scored)		(penalty missed) Pan Jia; (penalty scored) Wang Chao; (penalty missed) Cong Tianhao; (penalty missed) Tan Binliang; (penalty missed) Yu Jianfeng

=== Quarter-finals ===
21 September 2011	Shandong Luneng Taishan	2–2 (4–3 p)	Henan Jianye	Shandong Stadium, Jinan
19:30	Lü Zheng 17' 30'		Katongo 39' 90+2'
	Penalties
	Obina (penalty scored); Roda Antar (penalty scored); Wang Yongpo (penalty scored); Zhou Haibin (penalty scored)		(penalty missed) Fabão; (penalty scored) Katongo; (penalty scored) Flores; (penalty scored) Zhang Li; (penalty missed) Zhang Lu

21 September 2011	Hangzhou Greentown	0–2	Beijing Guoan	Jiaxing Stadium, Jiaxing
19:30			Ladji Keita 11'; Wang Xiaolong 87'	Referee: (China) Tao Rancheng

21 September 2011	Tianjin TEDA	2–0	Shaanxi Renhe	TEDA Stadium, Tianjin
19:30	Wang Xinxin 32'; Hu Rentian 35'

21 September 2011	Shanghai Shenhua	1–0	Yanbian Baekdu Tigers	Wuhu Stadium, Wuhu
19:30	Cao Yunding 18'

=== Semi-finals ===
19 October 2011	Shandong Luneng Taishan	0–0 (4–3 p)	Beijing Guoan	Shandong Stadium, Jinan
19:30				Referee: (South Korea) Lee Min-Hu
	Penalties
	Obina (penalty scored); Fabiano (penalty scored); Hao Junmin (penalty missed); Zhou Haibin (penalty scored); Roda Antar (penalty scored)		(penalty scored) Wang Xiaolong; (penalty missed) Xu Liang; (penalty scored) J. Griffiths; (penalty missed) W.Martínez; (penalty scored) Zhou Ting

19 October 2011	Tianjin TEDA	2–0	Shanghai Shenhua	TEDA Stadium, Tianjin
19:30	Bai Yuefeng 65'; Wang Xinxin 89'			Referee: (South Korea) Kim Jong-Hyeok

=== Final ===
The final is set to be played at a neutral venue which is the Olympic Sports Center in Hefei. The final is a single match, with extra time and penalty shootout if necessary.

19 November 2011
16:00

Shandong Luneng Taishan	1–2	Tianjin Teda
Han Peng 3'		Wang Xinxin 12'; Yu Dabao 63'

Olympic Sports Center, Hefei
Attendance: 19,813
Referee: Yudai Yamamoto (Japan)

Shandong	Tianjin

Shandong:
GK	22	(China) Yang Cheng
RB	15	(China) Yuan Weiwei
CB	4	(Brazil) Fabiano
CB	29	(Cape Verde) Ricardo
LB	16	(China) Zheng Zheng
DM	6	(China) Zhou Haibin
DM	18	(Lebanon) Roda Antar
RM	11	(China) Wang Tong	(substituted off) 64'
LM	8	(China) Wang Yongpo	(substituted off) 85'
SS	24	(China) Lü Zheng	(substituted off) 75'
CF	9	(China) Han Peng (c)
Substitutes:
GK	1	(China) Li Leilei
DF	2	(China) Liu Jindong
DF	5	(China) Wang Qiang
DF	14	(China) Mirahmetjan Muzepper	(substituted on) 85'
MF	23	(China) Li Wei
MF	50	(China) Hao Junmin	(substituted on) 64'
FW	10	(Brazil) Obina	(substituted on) 75'
Coach:
(Portugal) Manuel Barbosa

Tianjin:
GK	45	(China) Song Zhenyu	(yellow card) 87'
RB	26	(China) Cao Yang	(yellow card) 22'
CB	5	(China) Li Weifeng
CB	6	(Serbia) Marko Zorić	(yellow card) 50'
LB	14	(China) Bai Yuefeng
DM	44	(South Korea) Song Chong-Gug
RM	8	(China) Hu Rentian		(substituted off) 90+2'
LM	7	(China) Li Benjian		(substituted off) 90+7'
AM	36	(China) Chen Tao
AM	10	(China) Wang Xinxin (c)	(yellow card) 90+3'
ST	22	(China) Yu Dabao	(yellow card) 11'
Substitutes:
GK	25	(China) Yang Qipeng
DF	2	(China) He Yang
DF	15	(China) Liao Bochao
DF	19	(China) Nie Tao		(substituted on) 90+7'
MF	23	(China) Wu Weian		(substituted on) 90+2'
FW	20	(China) Mao Biao
FW	41	(China) Fan Zhiqiang
Coach:
(Netherlands) Arie Haan

Assistant referees:
Takahiro Okano (Japan)
Satoshi Karakami (Japan)
Fourth official:
Fan Qi (China)

== Awards ==
- Top Scorer: (Brazil) Muriqui (Guangzhou Evergrande)
- Most Valuable Player: (China) Yu Dabao (Tianjin Teda)
- Fair Play Award: Shandong Luneng

== Goal scorers ==
4 goals

- (Brazil) Muriqui (Guangzhou Evergrande)

3 goals

- (China) Gao Wanguo (Yanbian Baekdu Tigers)
- (China) Wang Xinxin (Tianjin Teda)
- (China) Yang Chen (Nanchang Hengyuan)

2 goals

- (Australia) Joel Griffiths (Beijing Guoan)
- (Zambia) Christopher Katongo (Henan Construction)
- (China) Lü Zheng (Shandong Luneng)
- (Brazil) Leandro Netto (Henan Construction)
- (China) Wang Xiaolong (Beijing Guoan)
- (Costa Rica) Johnny Woodly (Dalian Aerbin)
- (China) Yin Hongbo (Guangdong Sunray Cave)

1 goal

- (China) Bai Yuefeng (Tianjin Teda)
- (Brazil) Beto (Shenzhen Phoenix)
- (China) Cao Yunding (Shanghai Shenhua)
- (China) Du Zhenyu (Changchun Yatai)
- (China) Han Peng (Shandong Luneng)
- (China) Hu Rentian (Tianjin Teda)
- (China) Ji Jun (Nanchang Hengyuan)
- (China) Jiang Zhipeng (Nanchang Hengyuan)
- (Senegal) Ladji Keita (Beijing Guoan)
- (China) Li Kuanglun (Beijing BIT)
- (China) Liang Yanfeng (Shenzhen Phoenix)
- (China) Liu Yintao (Nanchang Hengyuan)
- (China) Liu Zhongyi (Chongqing Lifan)
- (China) Lü Wenjun (Shanghai East Asia)
- (Croatia) Darko Matić (Beijing Guoan)
- (Brazil) Mauro (Guizhou Toro)
- (Brazil) Nei (Changchun Yatai)
- (Brazil) Roberto (Beijing Guoan)
- (China) Sun Bo (Dalian Aerbin)
- (China) Tan Binliang (Guangdong Sunray Cave)
- (China) Wang Dong (Changchun Yatai)
- (China) Wang Lichun (Guizhou Toro)
- (China) Wang Shenchao (Shanghai East Asia)
- (China) Wang Xuanhong (Dalian Shide)
- (China) Wang Weicheng (Chongqing Lifan)
- (China) Wen Chao (Shenzhen Phoenix)
- (China) Xing Xufei (Liaoning Whowin)
- (China) Xu Bo (Yanbian Baekdu Tigers)
- (China) Xu Jingjie (Qingdao Jonoon)
- (China) Xu Liang (Beijing Guoan)
- (China) Xu Xiaobo (Chongqing Lifan)
- (China) Yu Dabao (Tianjin Teda)
- (China) Yu Hai (Shaanxi Renhe)
- (China) Zhang Chiming (Chongqing Lifan)
- (China) Zhang Lu (Henan Construction)
- (China) Zhang Wenzhao (Changchun Yatai)
- (China) Zhang Xizhe (Beijing Guoan)
- (China) Zhu Jiawei (Shaanxi Renhe)
