= Bayi Nanchang =

Bayi Nanchang may refer to several Chinese professional sports teams based in Nanchang and owned by the People's Liberation Army:

- Bayi Rockets, men's basketball team
- Bayi Kylin, women's basketball team
- Bayi Shenzhen, women's volleyball team
- Bayi men's volleyball team
- Bayi Nanchang men's table tennis team
- Bayi Nanchang women's table tennis team

== See also ==
- Shanghai Shenxin F.C., a men's football team formerly known as Nanchang Bayi Hengyuan F.C.
- Nanchang Bayi Stadium, a multi-use stadium in Nanchang
- Nanchang uprising, also known as Bayi uprising, a major uprising by the Chinese Communists in 1927
