= Chen Xing =

Chen Xing may refer to:

- Chen Xing (hydrologist) (1921–2009), Chinese hydrologist
- Mike Chen (Chen Xing, born 1980 or 1981), Chinese-born American YouTuber
- Chen Xing (footballer, born 1983), Chinese footballer
- Chen Xing (footballer, born 2000), Chinese footballer
