= Jiang Xiaochen =

Chinese footballer

Jiang Xiaochen 江晓辰
Personal information
- Full name: Jiang Xiaochen
- Date of birth: May 20, 1992 (age 34)
- Place of birth: Shanghai, China
- Height: 1.85 m (6 ft 1 in)
- Position: Forward

Team information
- Current team: Tianjin Fusheng

Youth career
- Zhabei Sports School
- 2009–2011: Boavista

Senior career*
Years	Team	Apps	(Gls)
2012–2014	Shanghai Shenxin	24	(0)
2016–2017	Sichuan Longfor	33	(9)
2018-2019	Shanghai Shenshui		
2020-2021	Dongguan United	13	(4)
2022-	Tianjin Fusheng	0	(0)
- * Club domestic league appearances and goals as of 12 May 2022

Jiang Xiaochen (Chinese: 江晓辰; born 20 May 1992 in Shanghai) is a Chinese professional football player for Tianjin Fusheng.

== Club career ==
Jiang Xiaochen joined Chinese Super League side Shanghai Shenxin in 2012 after an unsuccessful trial with Guangzhou Evergrande. He eventually made his league debut for Shanghai on 5 May 2012 in a game against Guangzhou R&F, coming on as a substitute for Zhu Jiawei in the 66th minute.

In March 2016, Jiang was signed for China League Two side Sichuan Longfor.

== Club career statistics ==
Statistics accurate as of match played 14 October 2017.

Club performance			League		Cup		League Cup		Continental		Total	
Season	Club	League	Apps	Goals	Apps	Goals	Apps	Goals	Apps	Goals	Apps	Goals
China PR			League		FA Cup		CSL Cup		Asia		Total	
2012	Shanghai Shenxin	Chinese Super League	11	0	1	1	-		-		12	1
2013	Shanghai Shenxin	Chinese Super League	7	0	2	0	-		-		9	0
2014	Shanghai Shenxin	Chinese Super League	6	0	0	0	-		-		6	0
2015	Hainan Seamen	Amateur League	-		-		-		-		-	-
2016	Sichuan Longfor	China League Two	16	4	0	0	-		-		16	4
2017	Sichuan Longfor	China League Two	17	5	1	0	-		-		18	5
Total	China PR		57	9	4	1	0	0	0	0	61	10
