= Xu Jingjie =

Chinese footballer

Xu Jingjie 许景杰
Personal information
- Full name: Xu Jingjie
- Date of birth: 4 February 1986 (age 40)
- Place of birth: Qingdao, Shandong, China
- Height: 1.85 m (6 ft 1 in)
- Position: Defender

Team information
- Current team: Qingdao Jonoon

Youth career
- Qingdao Jonoon

Senior career*
Years	Team	Apps	(Gls)
2005–2015	Qingdao Jonoon	79	(2)
- * Club domestic league appearances and goals as of 1 November 2015

Xu Jingjie (Chinese: 许景杰; pinyin: Xǔ Jǐngjié; born 4 February 1986) is a Chinese footballer who currently plays for Qingdao Jonoon in the China League One.

== Club career ==
Xu started his professional football career in 2005 when he was promoted to Qingdao Jonoon's first team. He made his senior debut on 15 October in a 1–1 away draw against Tianjin Teda. On 5 May 2011, he scored his first senior goal in the first round of the 2011 Chinese FA Cup; however, Qingdao Jonoon lost to the China League One club Guangdong Sunray Cave in the penalty shootout. On 15 April 2011, he was involved in a brawl during a match with Shanghai Shenxin, which resulted in a 5-match ban and a fine of ¥25,000. He scored his first and second league goals on 13 July 2013, in a 3–3 away draw with Dalian Aerbin.

== Career statistics ==
Club performance			League		Cup		League Cup		Continental		Total	
Season	Club	League	Apps	Goals	Apps	Goals	Apps	Goals	Apps	Goals	Apps	Goals
China PR			League		FA Cup		CSL Cup		Asia		Total	
2005	Qingdao Jonoon	Chinese Super League	0	0					-		0	0
2006	Qingdao Jonoon	Chinese Super League	2	0			-		-		2	0
2007	Qingdao Jonoon	Chinese Super League	9	0	-		-		-		9	0
2008	Qingdao Jonoon	Chinese Super League	18	0	-		-		-		18	0
2009	Qingdao Jonoon	Chinese Super League	17	0	-		-		-		17	0
2010	Qingdao Jonoon	Chinese Super League	7	0	-		-		-		7	0
2011	Qingdao Jonoon	Chinese Super League	14	0	1	1	-		-		15	1
2012	Qingdao Jonoon	Chinese Super League	3	0	2	0	-		-		5	0
2013	Qingdao Jonoon	Chinese Super League	9	2	2	1	-		-		11	3
2014	Qingdao Jonoon	China League One	0	0	0	0	-		-		0	0
2015	Qingdao Jonoon	China League One	0	0	0	0	-		-		0	0
Total	China PR		79	2	5	2	0	0	0	0	84	4

Statistics accurate as of match played 1 November 2015
