= Marcos Flores =

Argentine professional footballer

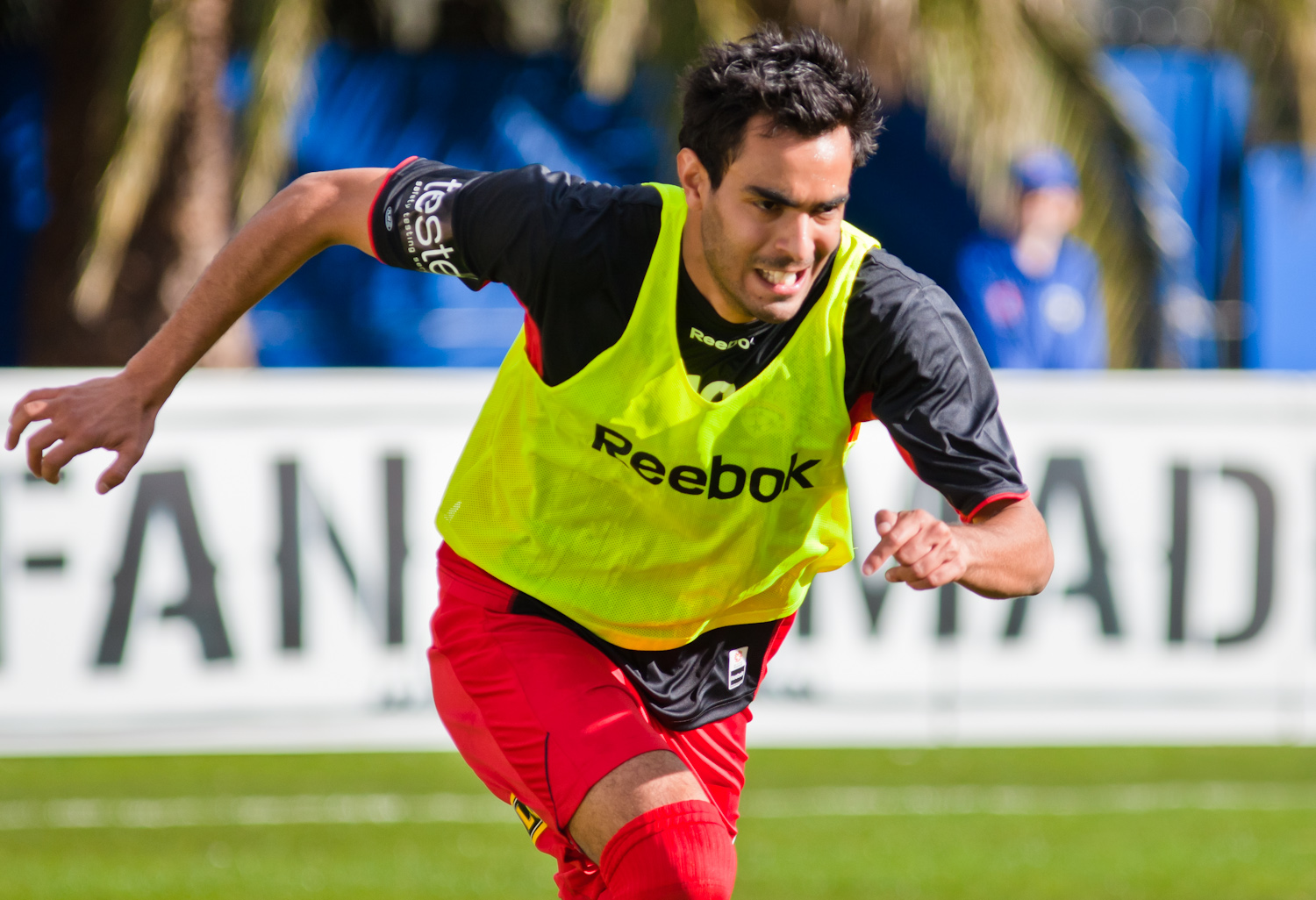
- Flores warming up with Adelaide United in 2010

Personal information
- Full name: Marcos Abel Flores Benard
- Date of birth: 23 October 1985 (age 41)
- Place of birth: Reconquista, Argentina
- Height: 1.84 m (6 ft 1/2 in)
- Position: Attacking midfielder

Youth career
- 2001–2003: Unión de Santa Fe

Senior career*
Years	Team	Apps	(Gls)
2003–2006	Unión de Santa Fe	24	(9)
2006–2008	Newell's Old Boys	16	(0)
2007–2008	→ Unión de Santa Fe (loan)	26	(2)
2009	Curicó Unido	25	(4)
2010–2011	Adelaide United	31	(8)
2011–2012	Henan Jianye	15	(0)
2012–2013	Melbourne Victory	24	(4)
2013–2014	Central Coast Mariners	12	(3)
2014–2015	Newcastle Jets	6	(1)
2015	Jacksonville Armada	22	(2)
2016	Curicó Unido	8	(1)
2016	Persib Bandung	13	(1)
2017	Bali United	26	(8)
2019–2020	Adelaide City	22	(4)
Total		270	(47)
- * Club domestic league appearances and goals

Marcos Abel Flores Benard (Spanish pronunciation: [ˈmaɾkos ˈfloɾes]; born 23 October 1985) is an Argentine former professional footballer who last played for, and captained, Adelaide City.

== Biography ==
=== Unión de Santa Fe ===
On 17 April 2004, Flores made his senior debut for Argentine club Unión de Santa Fe as a 67th-minute substitute for Miguel Sebastián Garcia and scored his first goal in the 89th minute of the same match.

=== Newell's Old Boys ===
In 2006, Flores was transferred to Newell's Old Boys but was loaned back to Unión de Santa Fe for a one-year period.

=== Curicó Unido ===
After returning to Newell's Old Boys, Flores was finally transferred to the Chilean Primera División club Curicó Unido.

=== Adelaide United ===
It was revealed in June 2009, that Australian A-League club Adelaide United had approached Flores for the 2009–10 A-League season, but the negotiations collapsed, citing Flores' desire to remain in South America. On 8 December 2009, Flores signed with Adelaide United and was named as part of the club's squad for the 2010 AFC Champions League. Flores was officially revealed by the club on 11 January 2010.

Flores was then registered as an injury replacement player for fellow import Cristiano and made his debut as a 60th-minute substitute for Adelaide United in their 2–0 win against Brisbane Roar on 6 February 2010. Flores impressed at Adelaide and gained instant legendary status by the Adelaide United fans. Flores provided the team with the playmaker position, and showcased skills and technique rarely seen in the A-League. Flores added aggression and stamina to his game since coming to the A-League.

Flores scored four A-League goal of the season contenders in the 2010–11 season. Flores' form at Adelaide attracted overseas attention, with J-League club Urawa Red Diamonds and aspiring MLS club New York Cosmos. On 21 January 2011, Flores scored his first A-league hat-trick for Adelaide in their record 8–1 win over North Queensland Fury. Flores won the Johnny Warren player of the year award for the 2010–11 season. Adelaide offered Flores a three-year deal worth $320,000 a season, which would have made him the highest paid player in the club's history.

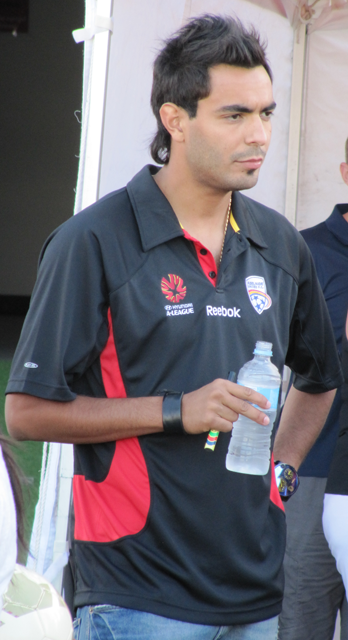

=== Henan Jianye ===
Flores announced his transfer to Chinese Super League club Henan Jianye on 26 June 2011, where he was set to earn $2.4 million over a three-year period. The transfer fee was said to be worth $500,000. Flores made his debut for Henan Jianye as a second-half substitute on 10 July 2011 in an away 0–0 draw against Changchun Yatai in the Chinese Super League. His contract was terminated by mutual consent at 21 June 2012. Flores stated that he was interested in coming back to Australia, preferably Adelaide United, but a move was halted due to salary cap reasons.

=== Melbourne Victory ===
On 4 July 2012, it was announced that Marcos Flores had signed with A-League club Melbourne Victory on a two-year deal worth around $1 million.

He made his debut in round 1 of the A-League against cross town rivals Melbourne Heart on 5 October 2012. Flores scored his first ever Melbourne Victory goal on 5 November 2012, in a game against Wellington Phoenix. Flores was released by Melbourne Victory on 5 July 2013, becoming a free agent.

=== Central Coast Mariners ===
Shortly after his release, he was signed by the Central Coast Mariners on a one-year contract. He was seriously injured, suffering an Anterior cruciate ligament tear, and was put out for the rest of the season. On 29 March 2014 the Mariners announced he would not be re-signed for the following season.

=== Newcastle Jets ===
On 9 June 2014, it was announced that Flores will play for the Newcastle Jets in the upcoming Hyundai A-League season. Marcos scored his first goal for the Newcastle Jets against the Western Sydney Wanderers in the 27th minute in a 1–1 draw.

On 15 January 2015, Flores' contract with the Jets was mutually terminated, to allow Flores to move to an overseas football club.

=== Jacksonville Armada ===
After being released by the Newcastle Jets, Flores signed with NASL team Jacksonville Armada FC. The Armada's General Manager, Dario Sala, flew out to Australia to complete the signing of Flores on 22 January 2015. Flores was released by Jacksonville in November 2015.

=== Curico Unido ===
On January 30 Marcos joined Curico Unido unfortunately things didn't work out and he only made a few starts and a few off the bench. He also sat on the bench and wasn't in the squad for most of the season. On the 2nd of August Marcos got released.

=== Persib Bandung ===
On August 30, 2016, Marcos signed a 4-months deal with Indonesia Soccer Championship A side Persib Bandung. He eventually got his debut on September 18 in an away match against Bali United.

=== Adelaide City ===
On 17 January 2019, Flores signed a 2-year deal with National Premier League side Adelaide City.

On 15 May 2020, Flores announced his retirement from football.

== Career statistics ==
Club	Season	League		Cup		Continental		Other^{1}		Total	
Club	Season	Apps	Goals	Apps	Goals	Apps	Goals	Apps	Goals	Apps	Goals
Curicó Unido	2009	25	4	0	0	–	–	2	0	27	4
Curicó Unido	Total	25	4	0	0	0	0	2	0	27	4
Adelaide United	2009–10	2	0	–	–	7	0	–	–	9	0
Adelaide United	2010–11	29	9	–	–	–	–	–	–	29	9
Adelaide United	Total	31	9	–	–	7	0	–	–	38	9
Henan Jianye	2011	11	0	0	0	–	–	–	–	11	0
Henan Jianye	2012	4	0	0	0	–	–	–	–	4	0
Henan Jianye	Total	15	0	0	0	0	0	–	–	15	0
Melbourne Victory	2012–13	24	4	–	–	–	–	–	–	24	4
Melbourne Victory	Total	24	4	–	–	0	0	–	–	24	4
Central Coast Mariners	2013–14	12	3	–	–	0	0	–	–	12	3
Central Coast Mariners	Total	12	3	–	–	0	0	–	–	12	3
Newcastle Jets	2014–15	6	1	0	0	–	–	–	–	6	1
Newcastle Jets	Total	6	1	0	0	0	0	–	–	6	1
Jacksonville Armada	2015	4	2	0	0	–	–	–	–	4	2
Jacksonville Armada	Total	4	2	0	0	0	0	–	–	4	2
Total		125	22	0	0	7	0	2	0	125	23

^{1} – includes Chilean Primera División play-offs

== Honours ==
Individual

- Johnny Warren Medal: 2010–11
- A-League Foreign Player of the Year: 2010–11
- Adelaide United Player's Player of the Year: 2010–11
- A-League Goal of the Year: 2012–13
