= Gao Yunfei =

Chinese footballer

Gao Yunfei 高云飞
Personal information
- Date of birth: 24 July 1992 (age 34)
- Place of birth: Tianjin, China
- Height: 1.83 m (6 ft 0 in)
- Position: Forward

Team information
- Current team: Lhasa UCI
- Number: 9

Youth career
- Tianjin Teda

Senior career*
Years	Team	Apps	(Gls)
2012–2016	Hebei China Fortune	17	(0)
2018–	Lhasa UCI	23	(4)
- * Club domestic league appearances and goals as of 12 October 2019

Gao Yunfei (Chinese: 高云飞; pinyin: Gāo Yúnfēi; born 24 July 1992) is a Chinese footballer who plays for China League Two side Lhasa Urban Construction Investment.

== Club career ==
Gao joined China League Two club Hebei Zhongji from Tianjin Teda youth team in 2012. On 26 May 2012, he scored his first and second goal for Hebei in the 2012 Chinese FA Cup which ensured Hebei beat Tongji University 2–1. He played as a substitute player in the club, following Hebei to promote to China League One in 2014 and Chinese Super League in 2016. He made his Super League debut on 10 July 2016 in a 2–0 home defeat against Guangzhou R&F, coming on as a substitute for Dong Xuesheng in the 76th minute.

== Career statistics ==
As of 12 October 2019.

Club performance			League		Cup		League Cup		Continental		Total	
Season	Club	League	Apps	Goals	Apps	Goals	Apps	Goals	Apps	Goals	Apps	Goals
China PR			League		FA Cup		CSL Cup		Asia		Total	
2012	Hebei China Fortune	China League Two	9	0	2	2	-		-		11	2
2013	Hebei China Fortune	China League Two	1	0	0	0	-		-		1	0
2014	Hebei China Fortune	China League One	4	0	0	0	-		-		4	0
2015	Hebei China Fortune	China League One	1	0	1	0	-		-		2	0
2016	Hebei China Fortune	Chinese Super League	2	0	3	0	-		-		5	0
2018	Lhasa UCI	Champions League	-		-		-		-		-	-
2019	Lhasa UCI	China League Two	23	4	0	0	-		-		23	4
Total	China PR		40	4	6	2	0	0	0	0	46	4
