= Xu Xiaobo =

Chinese footballer

Xu Xiaobo 徐小波
Personal information
- Date of birth: February 16, 1991 (age 35)
- Place of birth: Guizhou, China
- Height: 1.72 m (5 ft 7 1/2 in)
- Position: Defender

Senior career*
Years	Team	Apps	(Gls)
2010–2016	Chongqing Lifan	45	(1)
- * Club domestic league appearances and goals as of 30 October 2016

Xu Xiaobo (Chinese: 徐小波; born 16 February 1991) is a Chinese football player.

== Club career ==
Xu Xiaobo was promoted to Chinese Super League side Chongqing Lifan's first team squad in 2010. On 13 April 2011, he made his senior debut in a 2–1 home defeat against Shenyang Dongjin, coming on as a substitute for Luo Yi. He scored his first senior goal on 11 May 2011, in the second round of 2011 Chinese FA Cup against Henan Jianye. On 8 March 2015, he made his Super League debut in the season's first match which Chongqing Lifan lost to Beijing Guoan 3–0.

== Club career statistics ==
Statistics accurate as of match played 30 October 2016.

Club performance			League		Cup		League Cup		Continental		Total	
Season	Club	League	Apps	Goals	Apps	Goals	Apps	Goals	Apps	Goals	Apps	Goals
China PR			League		FA Cup		CSL Cup		Asia		Total	
2010	Chongqing Lifan	Chinese Super League	0	0	-		-		-		0	0
2011	Chongqing Lifan	China League One	8	0	2	1	-		-		10	1
2012	Chongqing Lifan	China League One	1	0	2	0	-		-		3	0
2013	Chongqing Lifan	China League One	8	0	1	1	-		-		9	1
2014	Chongqing Lifan	China League One	14	1	0	0	-		-		14	1
2015	Chongqing Lifan	Chinese Super League	8	0	2	0	-		-		10	0
2016	Chongqing Lifan	Chinese Super League	6	0	1	0	-		-		7	0
Total	China PR		45	1	8	2	0	0	0	0	53	3

== Honours ==
=== Club ===
Chongqing Lifan

- China League One: 2014
