= Wang Jianan (footballer) =

Chinese footballer

Wang Jianan 王嘉楠
Personal information
- Full name: Wang Jianan
- Date of birth: 31 May 1993 (age 33)
- Place of birth: Luoyang, Henan, China
- Height: 1.80 m (5 ft 11 in)
- Positions: Full-back; midfielder

Team information
- Current team: Shaanxi Union
- Number: 38

Senior career*
Years	Team	Apps	(Gls)
2011–2014	Henan Jianye	26	(0)
2015–2019	Guangzhou R&F	7	(0)
2020	Sagan Tosu	0	(0)
2021–2023	Tianjin Jinmen Tiger	42	(0)
2024–2025	Meizhou Hakka	40	(1)
2026–	Shaanxi Union	0	(0)
- * Club domestic league appearances and goals as of 1 March 2026

Wang Jianan (Chinese: 王嘉楠; pinyin: Wáng Jiānán; Mandarin pronunciation: [wǎŋ tɕjá.nǎn]; born 31 May 1993) is a Chinese footballer who plays as for Shaanxi Union in the China League One.

== Club career ==
In 2011 Wang Jianan started his professional footballer career with Henan Jianye in the Chinese Super League. He made his league debut for Henan on 2 November 2011 in a game against Shandong Luneng Taishan, coming on as a substitute for Xu Yang in the 77th minute. On 18 July 2012, he scored his first senior goal in a 2–1 away loss to Guangzhou Evergrande in the 2012 Chinese FA Cup. He was put in the transfer list at the end of 2014 season.

In July 2015, Wang transferred to fellow Chinese Super League side Guangzhou R&F. He made his debut for Guangzhou R&F on 31 October 2015 against Henan Jianye. On 15 April 2016, Wang suffered a cruciate ligament rupture after being tackled heavily by Darío Conca in a league match against Shanghai SIPG, ruling him out for the rest of the 2016 season. He returned to field on 18 June 2017 in a 1–1 home draw against Shanghai SIPG, coming on for Chen Zhizhao in the 79th minute.

== Career statistics ==
Statistics accurate as of match played 1 March 2026.

Appearances and goals by club, season and competition
Club	Season	League			National Cup		League Cup		Continental		Total	
Club	Season	Division	Apps	Goals	Apps	Goals	Apps	Goals	Apps	Goals	Apps	Goals
Henan Jianye	2011	Chinese Super League	1	0	0	0	-		-		1	0
Henan Jianye	2012	Chinese Super League	11	0	1	1	-		-		12	1
Henan Jianye	2013	China League One	13	0	2	0	-		-		15	0
Henan Jianye	2014	Chinese Super League	1	0	0	0	-		-		1	0
Henan Jianye	Total		26	0	3	1	0	0	0	0	29	1
Guangzhou R&F	2015	Chinese Super League	1	0	0	0	-		-		1	0
Guangzhou R&F	2016	Chinese Super League	5	0	0	0	-		-		5	0
Guangzhou R&F	2017	Chinese Super League	1	0	0	0	-		-		1	0
Guangzhou R&F	2018	Chinese Super League	0	0	0	0	-		-		0	0
Guangzhou R&F	2019	Chinese Super League	0	0	1	0	-		-		1	0
Guangzhou R&F	Total		7	0	1	0	0	0	0	0	8	0
Sagan Tosu	2020	J1 League	0	0	0	0	1	0	-		1	0
Tianjin Jinmen Tiger	2021	Chinese Super League	12	0	2	0	-		-		14	0
Tianjin Jinmen Tiger	2022	Chinese Super League	19	0	1	0	-		-		20	0
Tianjin Jinmen Tiger	2023	Chinese Super League	11	0	1	0	-		-		12	0
Tianjin Jinmen Tiger	Total		42	0	4	0	0	0	0	0	46	0
Meizhou Hakka	2024	Chinese Super League	12	1	1	0	-		-		13	1
Meizhou Hakka	2025	Chinese Super League	28	0	1	0	-		-		29	0
Meizhou Hakka	Total		40	1	2	0	0	0	0	0	42	1
Career total			115	1	10	1	1	0	0	0	126	2

== Honours ==
Henan Jianye

- China League One: 2013
