= Wu Yongchun =

Chinese footballer

Wu Yongchun 오영춘 吴永春
Personal information
- Date of birth: 30 March 1989 (age 37)
- Place of birth: Yanji, Jilin, China
- Height: 1.77 m (5 ft 10 in)
- Position: Full-back

Senior career*
Years	Team	Apps	(Gls)
2007–2018	Yanbian FC	176	(0)
2019	Yanbian Beiguo	14	(0)
- * Club domestic league appearances and goals as of 31 December 2020

Wu Yongchun
- Simplified Chinese: 吴永春
Transcriptions
Standard Mandarin
- Hanyu Pinyin: Wú Yǒngchūn
- IPA: [ǔ jʊ̌ŋ.ʈʂʰwə́n]

Chinese Korean name
- Chosŏn'gŭl: 오영춘
Transcriptions
- Revised Romanization: O Yeongchun
- McCune–Reischauer: O Yŏngch'un

Wu Yongchun (Chinese: 吴永春; Korean: 오영춘; born 30 March 1989) is a Chinese footballer.

== Club career ==
Wu Yongchun started his professional football career in 2007 when he was promoted to second-tier football club Yanbian FC's first team squad. He would gradually establish himself as a regular within their team and was a vital part of the team that won the 2015 China League One division. On 5 March 2016, Wu made his Super League debut in the first match of 2016 season against Shanghai Shenhua in a game that ended in a 1–1 draw.

== Career statistics ==
Statistics accurate as of match played 31 December 2020.

Club performance			League		National Cup		Continental		Other		Total	
Club	Season	League	Apps	Goals	Apps	Goals	Apps	Goals	Apps	Goals	Apps	Goals
Yanbian FC	2007	China League One	0	0	-		-		-		0	0
Yanbian FC	2008	China League One	0	0	-		-		-		0	0
Yanbian FC	2009	China League One	3	0	-		-		-		3	0
Yanbian FC	2010	China League One	2	0	-		-		-		2	0
Yanbian FC	2011	China League One	1	0	0	0	-		-		1	0
Yanbian FC	2012	China League One	17	0	1	0	-		-		18	0
Yanbian FC	2013	China League One	29	0	0	0	-		-		29	0
Yanbian FC	2014	China League One	27	0	2	0	-		-		29	0
Yanbian FC	2015	China League One	29	0	1	0	-		-		30	0
Yanbian FC	2016	Chinese Super League	28	0	0	0	-		-		28	0
Yanbian FC	2017	Chinese Super League	19	0	0	0	-		-		19	0
Yanbian FC	2018	China League One	21	0	1	0	-		-		22	0
Yanbian FC	Total		176	0	5	0	0	0	0	0	181	0
2019	Yanbian Beiguo	China League Two	14	0	0	0	-		-		14	0
Career total			190	0	5	0	0	0	0	0	195	0

== Honours ==
=== Club ===
Yanbian FC

- China League One: 2015
