= Rafa Jordà =

Spanish footballer (born 1984)

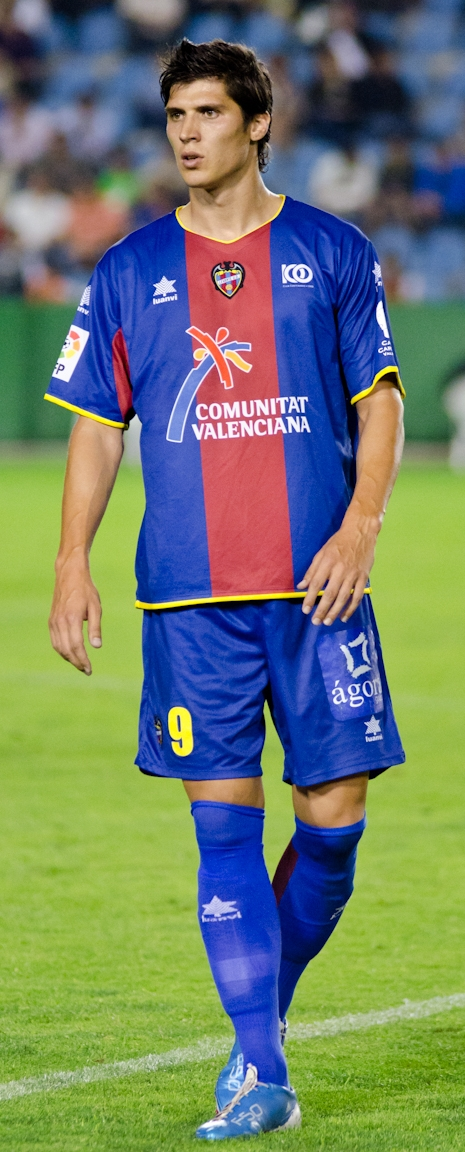
- Jordá in action for Levante in 2011

Personal information
- Full name: Rafael Jordà Ruiz de Assin
- Date of birth: 1 January 1984 (age 42)
- Place of birth: Santa Perpètua, Spain
- Height: 1.91 m (6 ft 3 in)
- Position: Centre-forward

Youth career
- 2000–2001: Damm
- 2001–2002: Valencia
- 2002–2003: Numancia

Senior career*
Years	Team	Apps	(Gls)
2003–2004	Numancia B		
2004–2008	Numancia	47	(7)
2004	→ Peralta (loan)	17	(8)
2006	→ Benidorm (loan)	18	(9)
2008–2009	Alicante	13	(3)
2009	Hércules	0	(0)
2010–2012	Levante	36	(7)
2012–2013	Guizhou Renhe	56	(18)
2014	Siena	10	(2)
2014	Dinamo Tbilisi	0	(0)
2015	Wuhan Zall	26	(6)
2016	Rapid București	8	(3)
2016–2017	Llagostera	18	(1)
2017–2018	Mumbai City	11	(1)
Total		260	(65)

International career
2010–	Catalonia	1	(0)
- * Club domestic league appearances and goals

Rafael "Rafa" Jordà Ruiz de Assin (Spanish: [ˈrafa ʝoɾˈða], (Note: In isolation, Jordà is pronounced [ɟʝoɾˈða].) Catalan: [ˈrafə ʒuɾˈða]; born 1 January 1984) is a Spanish former professional footballer who played as a centre-forward.

== Club career ==
Born in Santa Perpètua de Mogoda, Barcelona, Catalonia, Jordà finished his development with CD Numancia then made his senior debut with their reserves. He was subsequently loaned to Segunda División B club CM Peralta and, after appearing in three La Liga games with the former's first team towards the end of the 2004–05 season, the first being on 6 February 2005 as he featured the full 90 minutes in a 1–0 away loss against Getafe CF, was again loaned out to another side in the third level, Benidorm CF.

Jordà scored his first competitive goal for Numancia on 3 June 2007, heading a 26th-minute cross in a 3–1 home win over Polideportivo Ejido in the Segunda División. He contributed with six goals in 27 matches in the 2007–08 campaign, as the club from Soria returned to the top flight as champions.

In June 2008, news arose of Jordà signing for Alicante CF in division two and he eventually joined during that summer, switching to neighbouring Hércules CF at the end of the season, which ended in relegation. In late January 2010, after only three Copa del Rey appearances with the latter, he signed a two-year contract with Levante UD still in the second tier, netting in his debut two days later to help to a 2–1 league home defeat of Villarreal CF B; he repeated the feat in the following two rounds, at Cádiz CF (4–2 away win) and RC Celta de Vigo (1–0, home).

In March 2012, aged 28, Jordà moved abroad for the first time in his career, joining Chinese Super League side Guizhou Renhe F.C. and sharing teams with countrymen Nano and Rubén Suárez as the first two became the first Spaniards to play in the country. In the semi-finals of the Chinese FA Cup against Shandong Luneng Taishan FC, he scored once and provided an assist in an eventual qualification on the away goals rule.

After leaving in January 2014 as a free agent, Jordà represented in quick succession A.C. Siena, FC Dinamo Tbilisi and Wuhan Zall FC. On 4 August 2017, the 33-year-old signed for Indian Super League franchise Mumbai City FC from UE Llagostera.

== Career statistics ==
Appearances and goals by club, season and competition
Club	Season	League			Cup		Other		Total	
Club	Season	Division	Apps	Goals	Apps	Goals	Apps	Goals	Apps	Goals
Numancia	2004–05	La Liga	3	0	2	0	—		5	0
Numancia	2005–06	Segunda División	4	0	0	0	—		4	0
Numancia	2006–07	Segunda División	13	1	1	0	—		14	1
Numancia	2007–08	Segunda División	27	6	1	0	—		28	6
Numancia	Total		47	7	4	0	—		51	7
Peralta (loan)	2004–05	Segunda División B	17	8	2	0	—		19	8
Benidorm (loan)	2005–06	Segunda División B	18	9	0	0	—		18	9
Alicante	2008–09	Segunda División	13	3	0	0	—		13	3
Hércules	2009–10	Segunda División	0	0	3	0	—		3	0
Levante	2009–10	Segunda División	17	5	0	0	—		17	5
Levante	2010–11	La Liga	17	2	3	0	—		20	2
Levante	2011–12	La Liga	2	0	4	0	—		6	0
Levante	Total		36	7	7	0	—		43	7
Guizhou Renhe	2012	Chinese Super League	27	8	7	6	—		34	14
Guizhou Renhe	2013	Chinese Super League	29	10	5	0	—		34	10
Guizhou Renhe	Total		56	18	12	6	—		68	24
Siena	2013–14	Serie B	10	2	0	0	—		10	2
Dinamo Tbilisi	2014–15	Umaglesi Liga	0	0	0	0	2	0	2	0
Wuhan Zall	2015	China League One	26	6	0	0	—		26	6
Rapid București	2015–16	Liga II	8	3	0	0	—		8	3
Llagostera	2016–17	Segunda División B	18	1	0	0	—		18	1
Mumbai City	2017–18	Indian Super League	11	1	—		—		11	1
Career total			260	65	28	6	2	0	290	71

== Honours ==
Numancia

- Segunda División: 2007–08

Guizhou Renhe

- Chinese FA Cup: 2013
