= He Bin =

Chinese footballer

He Bin 何滨
Personal information
- Full name: He Bin
- Date of birth: June 26, 1983 (age 43)
- Place of birth: Luoyang, Henan, China
- Height: 1.78 m (5 ft 10 in)
- Position: Midfielder

Youth career
- Shanghai Shenhua

Senior career*
| Years | Team | Apps | (Gls) |
| 2004–2005 | Shanghai Shenhua | 12 | (0) |
| 2006–2014 | Henan Jianye | 117 | (6) |
| 2014 | → Chengdu Tiancheng (loan) | 10 | (1) |
- * Club domestic league appearances and goals as of 13 November 2014

He Bin (Chinese: 何滨; born June 26, 1983) is a Chinese former footballer who played as a midfielder.

== Club career ==
=== Shanghai Shenhua ===
He Bin graduated from the Shanghai Shenhua youth team in 2004 after playing for their various youth teams that trained in Brazil. He would go on to make his league debut on October 2, 2004 when he came on as a substitute for Yu Tao against Sichuan Guancheng that ended 1-1. Despite being included in the senior team for two seasons he was unable to establish himself within the squad and only played in 12 league games.

=== Henan Jianye ===
Shanghai Shenhua allowed He Bin to transfer to second tier club Henan Jianye in 2006 where he would play his part in their promotion and league win. A squad regular throughout the 2007 Chinese Super League campaign it wasn't until the 2008 league season before he established himself as an integral member within the squad. This was followed by He Bin aiding Henan to their highest ever league ranking of third within the 2009 league season and entry to the 2010 AFC Champions League for the first time where he played on one game during the tournament against Gamba Osaka on April 27, 2010 in a 1-1 draw. In February 2014, He Bin moved to China League One side Chengdu Tiancheng on a one-year loan deal.

He chose to retire at the end of the 2014 season due to injuries.

== Honours ==
Henan Jianye

- China League One: 2006, 2013
