= Tan Wangsong =

Chinese footballer

Tan Wangsong 谭望嵩
Personal information
- Full name: Tan Wangsong
- Date of birth: December 19, 1985 (age 40)
- Place of birth: Chengdu, Sichuan, China
- Height: 1.80 m (5 ft 11 in)
- Position: Right-back

Team information
- Current team: Tianjin Jinmen Tiger (assistant coach)

Youth career
- Sichuan Guancheng

Senior career*
Years	Team	Apps	(Gls)
2003–2005	Sichuan Guancheng	32	(1)
2006	Qingdao Jonoon	16	(0)
2007–2009	Tianjin Teda	64	(2)
2010–2014	Henan Construction	96	(0)
2015–2016	Chongqing Lifan	26	(1)
2017–2022	Tianjin Teda	39	(0)

International career^{‡}
2006–2008	China U-23	7	(1)

Managerial career
- 2021–: Tianjin Jinmen Tiger (assistant)
Medal record
Representing China
Men's football
AFC Youth Championship
Silver medal – second place	2004 َ Malaysia	Team
- * Club domestic league appearances and goals as of 31 January 2023 ‡ National team caps and goals as of Dec 2, 2011

Tan Wangsong (simplified Chinese: 谭望嵩; traditional Chinese: 譚望嵩; pinyin: Tán Wàngsōng; born December 19, 1985, in Chengdu, Sichuan) is a former Chinese footballer who played as a right-back for Tianjin Teda.

== Club career ==
Tan Wangsong would start his career with Sichuan Guancheng where he would establish himself as the first choice right-back within the team, although he was considered a relatively thin player he endeared himself towards the coaching staff with his vigorous and bold style of play. His time at the club would end when Sichuan Guancheng disbanded and he would transfer to another top-tier club in Qingdao Zhongneng. A move to another Chinese Super League team in Tianjin Teda would see him establish himself as an integral member of the team that qualified for their first ever AFC Champions League. He would represent them in their first game in the competition on 11 March 2009 against Kawasaki Frontale in a 1–0 defeat in the 2009 AFC Champions League.

On 13 June 2009 in a league game that Tianjin Teda was losing 1–0 against Beijing Guoan, Tan was red-carded in the 90th minute for a high tackle against Yang Zhi. Tan would receive a five-game ban and along with his red card against Belgium on 10 August 2008 while representing the Chinese U-23 team in the 2008 Olympics, a reputation as a dirty player. Due to his negative reputation and a falling out with the club authorities, he moved to Henan Construction on 12 February 2010.

On 5 February 2015, Tan transferred to fellow Chinese Super League side Chongqing Lifan. On 23 December 2016, Chongqing Lifan officially confirmed that Tan had left the club after a disagreement in negotiations for extending his contract. On 9 January 2017, Tan returned to Tianjin Teda.

== International career ==
Tan was a member of the China national under-23 football team and played on the team in the 2008 Olympics in Beijing. In an unusual occurrence that received international attention, in the match against Belgium on August 10, 2008, Tan was red-carded for kicking Sébastien Pocognoli in the crotch.

== Career statistics ==
Statistics accurate as of match played 31 January 2023.

Appearances and goals by club, season and competition
Club	Season	League			National Cup		League Cup		Continental		Total	
Club	Season	Division	Apps	Goals	Apps	Goals	Apps	Goals	Apps	Goals	Apps	Goals
Sichuan Guancheng	2003	Chinese Jia-A League	7	0	0	0	-		-		7	0
Sichuan Guancheng	2004	Chinese Super League	11	0	4	0		0	-		15	0
Sichuan Guancheng	2005	Chinese Super League	14	1	0	0		0	-		14	1
Sichuan Guancheng	Total		32	1	4	0	0	0	0	0	36	1
Qingdao Zhongneng	2006	Chinese Super League	16	0	0	0	-		-		16	0
Tianjin Teda	2007	Chinese Super League	22	1	-		-		-		22	1
Tianjin Teda	2008	Chinese Super League	19	1	-		-		-		19	1
Tianjin Teda	2009	Chinese Super League	23	0	-		-		3	0	26	0
Tianjin Teda	Total		64	2	0	0	0	0	3	0	67	2
Henan Construction	2010	Chinese Super League	15	0	-		-		5	0	20	0
Henan Construction	2011	Chinese Super League	22	0	2	0	-		-		24	0
Henan Construction	2012	Chinese Super League	16	0	0	0	-		-		16	0
Henan Construction	2013	China League One	28	0	0	0	-		-		28	0
Henan Construction	2014	Chinese Super League	15	0	0	0	-		-		15	0
Henan Construction	Total		96	0	2	0	0	0	5	0	103	0
Chongqing Lifan	2015	Chinese Super League	14	1	0	0	-		-		14	1
Chongqing Lifan	2016	Chinese Super League	12	0	1	0	-		-		13	0
Chongqing Lifan	Total		26	1	1	0	0	0	0	0	27	1
Tianjin Teda	2017	Chinese Super League	9	0	1	0	-		-		10	0
Tianjin Teda	2018	Chinese Super League	4	0	1	0	-		-		5	0
Tianjin Teda	2019	Chinese Super League	13	0	2	1	-		-		15	1
Tianjin Teda	2020	Chinese Super League	6	0	0	0	-		-		6	0
Tianjin Teda	2021	Chinese Super League	7	0	0	0	-		-		7	0
Tianjin Teda	2022	Chinese Super League	0	0	0	0	-		-		0	0
Tianjin Teda	Total		39	0	4	1	0	0	0	0	43	1
Career total			273	4	11	1	0	0	8	0	292	5

== Honours ==
=== Club ===
Henan Construction

- China League One: 2013.
