= Gao Xiang (footballer) =

Chinese footballer

Gao Xiang 高翔
Personal information
- Date of birth: 14 February 1989 (age 37)
- Place of birth: Qingdao, China
- Height: 1.75 m (5 ft 9 in)
- Position: Midfielder

Senior career*
Years	Team	Apps	(Gls)
2007	Qingdao Hailifeng	?	(?)
2008–2014	Chengdu Blades	101	(18)
2009	→ Ferencvárosi TC (loan)	0	(0)
2015–2021	Qingdao FC	170	(31)
2022	Quanzhou Yassin	6	(2)
2022	Zibo Qisheng	5	(0)

Managerial career
- 2025-: Qingdao West Coast U21 (assistant)
- * Club domestic league appearances and goals as of 26 July 2022

Gao Xiang (Chinese: 高翔; pinyin: Gāo Xiáng) (born: February 14, 1989 in Qingdao) is a Chinese football coach and former football player who played as a midfielder.

== Club career ==
=== Qingdao Hailifeng ===
Gao Xiang would start his football career playing for the Qingdao Hailifeng youth team and would graduate from their football academy in 2007.

=== Chengdu Blades ===
Gao would move to top tier side Chengdu Blades in the 2008 Chinese Super League season and would make his debut on September 6, 2008 against Shenzhen Xiangxue in a 0-0 draw. He would go on to establish himself as a squad regular within the team and would make fifteen appearances in his debut season for the club. Continuing to be a squad regular Gao would find out that the club would be relegated to the second tier when it was discovered that they fixed several games in 2007 to help them in their process for promotion to the top tier. Gao decided to remain faithful towards the club and would play in fifteen league games and scored five goals to aid Chengdu gain promotion at the end of the season.

=== Qingdao Hainiu ===
On 16 February 2015, Gao transferred to China League One side Qingdao Hainiu. He would become an integral member of the team that would win the 2019 China League One division and promotion into the top tier.

== Career statistics ==
As of 13 January 2022.

Appearances and goals by club, season and competition
Club	Season	League			National Cup		Continental		Other		Total	
Club	Season	Division	Apps	Goals	Apps	Goals	Apps	Goals	Apps	Goals	Apps	Goals
Qingdao Hailifeng	2007	China League One	?	?	-		-		-		?	?
Chengdu Blades	2008	Chinese Super League	15	0	-		-		-		15	0
Chengdu Blades	2009	Chinese Super League	4	0	-		-		-		4	0
Chengdu Blades	2010	China League One	15	5	-		-		-		15	5
Chengdu Blades	2011	Chinese Super League	4	0	0	0	-		-		4	0
Chengdu Blades	2012	China League One	24	8	2	0	-		-		26	8
Chengdu Blades	2013	China League One	24	3	0	0	-		-		24	3
Chengdu Blades	2014	China League One	15	2	0	0	-		-		15	2
Chengdu Blades	Total		101	18	2	0	0	0	0	0	103	18
Ferencvárosi TC (loan)	2008–09	Nemzeti Bajnokság II	0	0	0	0	-		-		0	0
Qingdao Huanghai	2015	China League One	25	2	0	0	-		-		25	2
Qingdao Huanghai	2016	China League One	27	3	1	0	-		-		28	3
Qingdao Huanghai	2017	China League One	27	4	2	0	-		-		29	4
Qingdao Huanghai	2018	China League One	29	9	0	0	-		-		29	9
Qingdao Huanghai	2019	China League One	30	12	0	0	-		-		30	12
Qingdao Huanghai	2020	Chinese Super League	18	1	0	0	-		-		18	1
Qingdao Huanghai	2021	Chinese Super League	14	0	1	0	-		1	0	16	0
Qingdao Huanghai	Total		170	31	3	0	0	0	1	0	176	31
Career total			256	49	8	0	0	0	1	0	278	49

== Honours ==
=== Club ===
Qingdao Huanghai

- China League One: 2019
