= Zhu Jiawei =

Chinese footballer

Zhu Jiawei 朱家伟
Personal information
- Date of birth: 19 August 1990 (age 36)
- Place of birth: Xingning, Guangdong, China
- Height: 1.80 m (5 ft 11 in)
- Position: Midfielder

Youth career
- 2003–2007: Shaanxi Chanba

Senior career*
Years	Team	Apps	(Gls)
2008–2011	Shaanxi Chanba	49	(1)
2012–2014	Shanghai Shenxin	30	(1)
- * Club domestic league appearances and goals as of 12 November 2014

Zhu Jiawei (Chinese: 朱家伟; pinyin: Zhū Jiāwěi, born 19 August 1990) is a Chinese football player.

== Club career ==
Zhu joined Inter Shanghai youth team system with his countryman Rao Weihui in 2003 and was promoted to Shaanxi Chanba first team squad in 2008. On 17 May 2008, he made his senior debut aged 17 years and 271 days in a 2008 Chinese Super League match which Shaanxi Chanba tied with Dalian Shide 1–1. He scored his first senior goal on 13 October 2008, in a 3–0 home victory against Liaoning Whowin. On 26 May 2011, he scored the winning goal of the third round of 2011 Chinese FA Cup, which Shaanxi Chanba beat Liaoning whowin 1–0.

Zhu transferred to another Super League club Shanghai Shenxin in 2012. On 26 June 2012, he scored his first goal for Shenxin in the third round of 2012 Chinese FA Cup, however, he missed a penalty in the penalty shootout as Shanghai Shenxin lost to China League One side Shenyang Shenbei 6–4. He left Shanghai Shenxin at the end of 2014 season.

== Career statistics ==
As of 12 November 2014

Club performance			League		Cup		League Cup		Continental		Total	
Season	Club	League	Apps	Goals	Apps	Goals	Apps	Goals	Apps	Goals	Apps	Goals
China PR			League		FA Cup		CSL Cup		Asia		Total	
2008	Shaanxi Chanba	Chinese Super League	20	1	-		-		-		20	1
2009	Shaanxi Chanba	Chinese Super League	9	0	-		-		-		9	0
2010	Shaanxi Chanba	Chinese Super League	2	0	-		-		-		2	0
2011	Shaanxi Chanba	Chinese Super League	18	0	2	1	-		-		20	1
2012	Shanghai Shenxin	Chinese Super League	15	0	1	1	-		-		16	1
2013	Shanghai Shenxin	Chinese Super League	14	1	1	0	-		-		15	1
2014	Shanghai Shenxin	Chinese Super League	1	0	0	0	-		-		0	0
Total	China PR		78	2	4	2	0	0	0	0	82	4
