= Hu Baosen =

Chinese businessman

Hu Baosen is a Chinese businessman and the owner of Henan F.C. of the Chinese Super League. He is the founder, owner, and chairman of Henan Jianye, a construction firm. He has been listed by Forbes as one of China's 400 richest individuals.
