= Nanchang Bayi Stadium =

Sports venue in Nanchang, China

Coordinates: 28°41′6.99″N 115°55′22.56″E

Nanchang Bayi Stadium (Simplified Chinese: 南昌八一体育场) is a multi-use stadium in Nanchang, China. It is currently used mostly for football matches and athletics events. This stadium's capacity is 26,000 people.
