= Hu Rentian =

Chinese footballer

Hu Rentian 胡人天
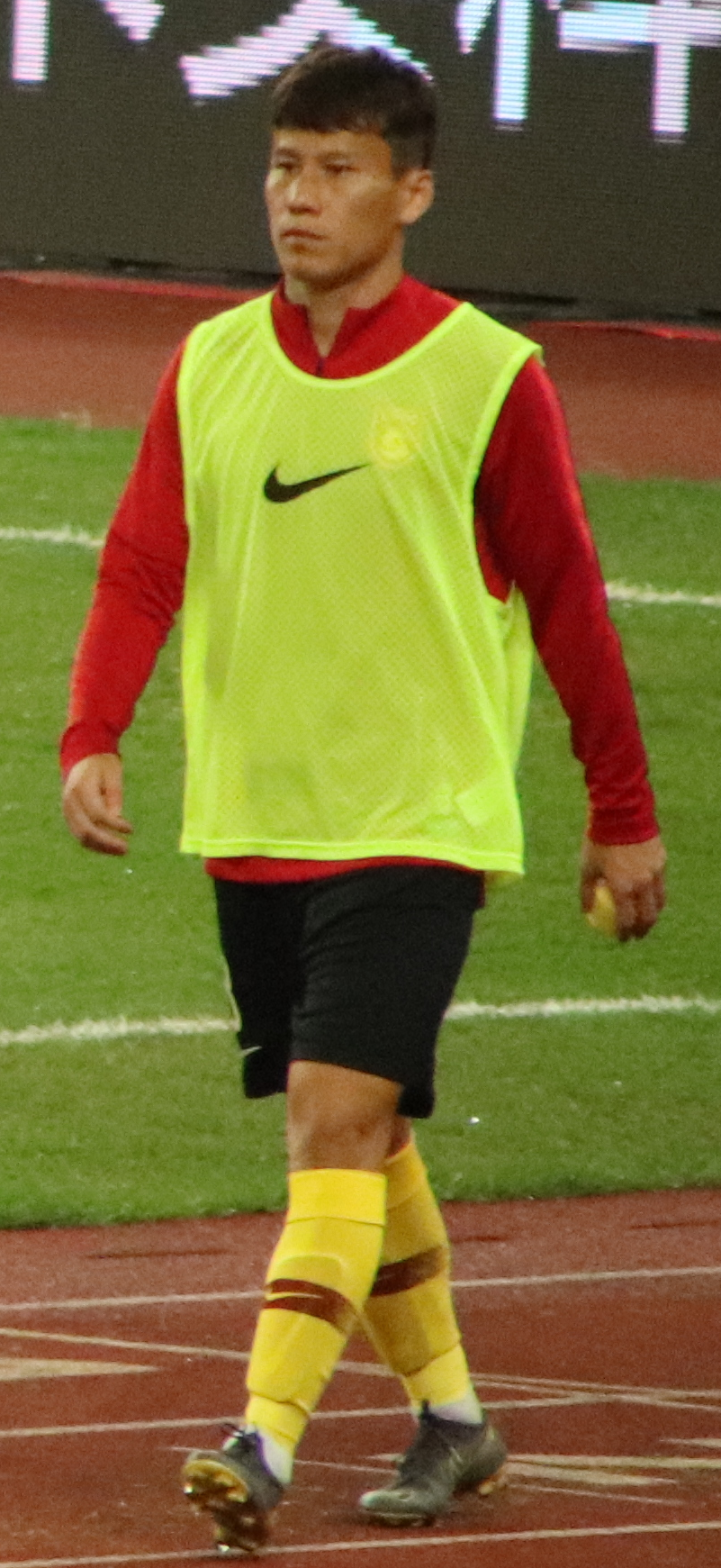

Personal information
- Date of birth: January 21, 1991 (age 35)
- Place of birth: Chengdu, Sichuan, China
- Height: 1.75 m (5 ft 9 in)
- Position: Midfielder

Team information
- Current team: Nanjing City
- Number: 11

Youth career
- 1999–2007: Gaofengwen Football Academy
- 2007–2009: Tianjin TEDA

Senior career*
Years	Team	Apps	(Gls)
2009–2017	Tianjin TEDA	156	(20)
2018–2021	Hebei FC	33	(1)
2022	Wuhan Yangtze River	26	(2)
2023–2024	Guangxi Pingguo Haliao	30	(1)
2025–	Nanjing City	21	(0)

International career^{‡}
2009–2010	China U-19	6	(0)
2016–2017	China	3	(1)
- * Club domestic league appearances and goals as of 9 March 2026 ‡ National team caps and goals as of 14 January 2017

Hu Rentian
- Chinese: 胡人天
Transcriptions
Standard Mandarin
- Hanyu Pinyin: Hú Réntiān
- IPA: [xǔ ɻə̌n tʰjɛ́n]

Hu Rentian (Chinese: 胡人天; pinyin: Hú Réntiān; born January 21, 1991, in Chengdu) is a Chinese professional footballer who currently plays for Chinese League One club Nanjing City.

== Club career ==
Hu Rentian was promoted to the senior team of Tianjin Teda F.C. during the 2009 league season and would eventually make his debut on August 30, 2009, in a league game against Jiangsu Sainty where he would also score his first senior goal in a 1–0 victory. His abilities would quickly draw comparisons to fellow Tianjin and former Young Player of the Year award winner Hao Junmin and he was seen as his successor within the club. When Hao Junmin left the club to join FC Schalke 04 at the beginning of the 2010 league season Hu would have to prove himself within the team and the manager Arie Haan only used Hu sparingly throughout the season, however Tianjin would finish the league second and were eligible for the 2011 AFC Champions League. By the following season the manager showed more faith within Hu and while he only gave Hu a single continental appearance he did allow him to play in the 2011 Chinese FA Cup final, which Tianjin won 2-1 against Shandong Luneng.

He transferred to fellow Chinese Super League side Hebei China Fortune on February 23, 2018.

== International career ==
Hu Rentian was included in the squad to qualify for the 2010 AFC U-19 Championship and would play in three games during qualification that saw the team easily qualify for the tournament. At the tournament Hu would go on to play in three further games as China were knocked out in the quarter-finals. He made his debut for China national football team on 3 June 2016 in a 4–2 win against Trinidad and Tobago, coming on as a substitute for Gao Lin in the second half. He scored his first international goal in the match.

== Career statistics ==
=== Club statistics ===
As of 5 November 2023.

Appearances and goals by club, season and competition
Club	Season	League			National Cup		Continental		Other		Total	
Club	Season	Division	Apps	Goals	Apps	Goals	Apps	Goals	Apps	Goals	Apps	Goals
Tianjin Teda	2009	Chinese Super League	9	1	-		0	0	-		9	1
Tianjin Teda	2010	Chinese Super League	12	1	-		-		-		12	1
Tianjin Teda	2011	Chinese Super League	16	3	3	1	1	0	-		20	4
Tianjin Teda	2012	Chinese Super League	7	0	1	0	1	0	1 (Note: Appearances in Chinese FA Super Cup)	0	10	0
Tianjin Teda	2013	Chinese Super League	8	0	2	0	-		-		10	0
Tianjin Teda	2014	Chinese Super League	29	4	1	0	-		-		30	4
Tianjin Teda	2015	Chinese Super League	25	3	1	0	-		-		26	3
Tianjin Teda	2016	Chinese Super League	30	4	0	0	-		-		30	4
Tianjin Teda	2017	Chinese Super League	20	2	0	0	-		-		20	2
Tianjin Teda	Total		156	18	8	1	2	0	1	0	167	19
Hebei China Fortune	2018	Chinese Super League	14	0	0	0	-		-		14	0
Hebei China Fortune	2019	Chinese Super League	2	0	0	0	-		-		2	0
Hebei China Fortune	2020	Chinese Super League	0	0	0	0	-		-		0	0
Hebei China Fortune	2021	Chinese Super League	17	1	0	0	-		-		17	1
Hebei China Fortune	Total		33	1	0	0	0	0	0	0	33	1
Wuhan Yangtze River	2022	Chinese Super League	26	2	0	0	-		-		26	2
Guangxi Pingguo Haliao	2023	China League One	13	0	0	0	-		-		13	0
Total			228	21	8	1	2	0	1	0	239	22

=== International goal ===
As of match played 3 June 2016. China score listed first, score column indicates score after each Hu Rentian goal.

International goals by date, venue, cap, opponent, score, result and competition
No.	Date	Venue	Cap	Opponent	Score	Result	Competition
1	3 June 2016	Qinhuangdao Olympic Sports Center Stadium, Qinhuangdao, China	1	Trinidad and Tobago	4–2	4–2	Friendly

== Honours ==
=== Club ===
Tianjin Teda

- Chinese FA Cup: 2011
