= Chen Xing (footballer, born 1983) =

Chinese international football player

Chen Xing 陈星
Personal information
- Date of birth: January 17, 1983 (age 43)
- Place of birth: Shenyang, China
- Height: 1.81 m (5 ft 11 1/2 in)
- Positions: Striker; midfielder

Senior career*
Years	Team	Apps	(Gls)
2002	Shanghai United	0	(0)
2003–2011	Liaoning FC	88	(14)
2012–2014	Shenyang Shenbei	38	(5)

International career^{‡}
2010	China	1	(0)
- * Club domestic league appearances and goals as of 12:00, 11 Nov 2014 (UTC) ‡ National team caps and goals as of 09:56, 1 Jan 2012 (UTC)

Chen Xing (Chinese: 陈星) (born January 17, 1983, in Shenyang) is a Chinese former international football player who played as a striker.

== Club career ==
Chen Xing would start his professional football career with second-tier football club Shanghai United F.C. during the 2002 league season and would attract the interests of top-tier side Liaoning FC who he would transfer to the following season. At his new club he would initially struggle to gain a regular place within the squad, however he was eventually given his chance to establish his skillful goal scoring abilities during the 2005 league season when he scored six goals in eighteen appearances. The following season, however saw him struggle for form despite regular playing time and he was only able to score one league goal throughout the whole campaign. After that disappointing campaign Chen saw himself dropped from being a regular starter and what little playing time he did receive was often out of position in midfield where by the end of the 2008 league season he saw Liaoning relegated to the second tier. Even with the club playing in a lower league Chen would still have to wait to prove himself once more within the team before he aided the club to win promotion back into the Chinese Super League when he won the second division title with the team in 2009.

== International career ==
During the 2010 Chinese Super League season Chen Xing would have a personally productive season with Liaoning and his ability to link the midfield and attack saw him given a call-up to the China national team where he would make his debut against Syria on October 8, 2010, in a friendly that China would win 2–1, coming on as a substitute for Deng Zhuoxiang.

== Honours ==
Liaoning FC

- China League One: 2009
