= Lu Feng (footballer) =

Chinese footballer

Lu Feng 陆峰
Personal information
- Full name: Lu Feng
- Date of birth: 12 November 1981 (age 44)
- Place of birth: Luoyang, Henan, China
- Height: 1.82 m (6 ft 0 in)
- Position: Midfielder

Senior career*
Years	Team	Apps	(Gls)
2001–2003	Henan Jianye	26	(0)
2004–2005	Qingdao Jonoon	46	(7)
2006–2014	Henan Jianye	155	(12)

International career^{‡}
2002–2008	China	3	(0)

Managerial career
- 2021–2024: Henan FC U19
- 2024–: Henan FC (assistant)
Medal record
Representing China
Men's football
AFC Youth Championship
Bronze medal – third place	2000 َ Iran	Team
- * Club domestic league appearances and goals as of 07:27, 1 Jan 2012 (UTC) ‡ National team caps and goals as of 14:45, 1 Jan 2012 (UTC)

Lu Feng (Chinese: 陆峰; born 12 November 1981 in Luoyang) is a Chinese football coach and former professional footballer who played as a midfielder, he spent the majority of his playing career at Henan Jianye, led them to 2 promotions to Chinese Super League in 2006 and 2013 and scored the club's first goal in the top division in 2007.

== Club career ==
Lu Feng started his professional football career with Henan Jianye in 2001, however he rose to prominace in 2003 when in appeared in 26 league games. This led to the transfer to Qingdao and a chance to play in the Chinese Super League. After two seasons with Qingdao he returned to Henan Jianye in their successful fight for promotion to the Chinese Super League after winning the 2006 China League One division with them. He would be a vital member of the team as the club survived within the league and gradually saw them improve their league standings until they reached third within the 2009 Chinese Super League season and qualified for the 2010 AFC Champions League for the first time. Within the tournament he would go on to play in five games as Henan were knocked out within the group stages.

== International career ==
Despite playing for a second tier club, Lu Feng was considered a promising young player and was given his debut cap against Jordan on 9 December 2002 in a 0-0 friendly. An unimpressive performance saw Lu Feng having to wait six more years before he was given his second cap, against Mexico on 16 April 2008 in a 1-0 friendly defeat.

== Honours ==
Henan Jianye

- China League One: 2006, 2013
