= Wu Wei'an =

Chinese footballer

Wu Wei'an 吴伟安
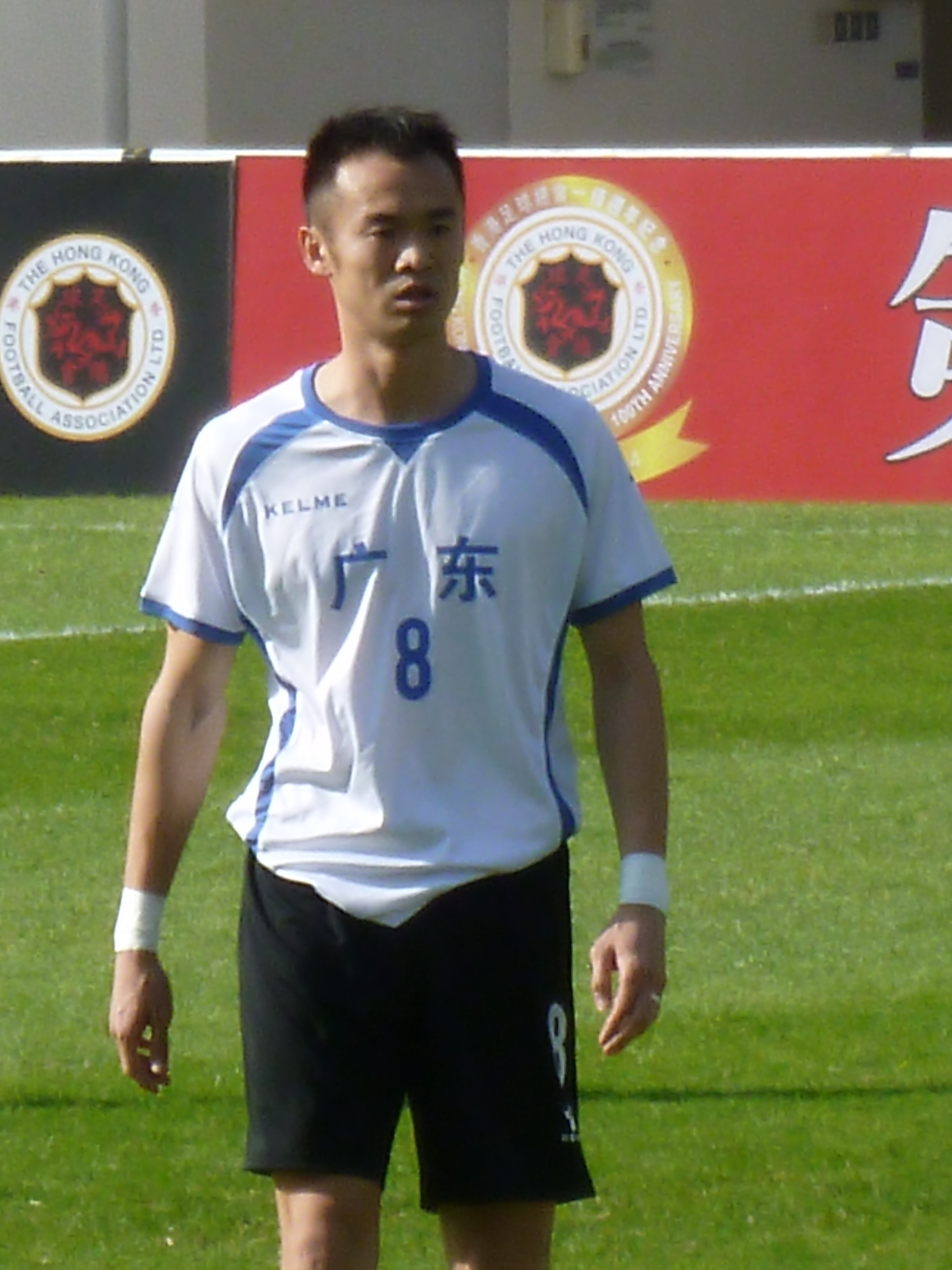

Personal information
- Full name: Wu Wei'an
- Date of birth: September 1, 1981 (age 45)
- Place of birth: Meizhou, Guangdong, China
- Height: 1.81 m (5 ft 11 in)
- Positions: Attacking midfielder; winger

Youth career
- 2000–2001: Guangdong Youth

Senior career*
Years	Team	Apps	(Gls)
2002–2004	Guangdong Xiongying	56	(12)
2005–2011	Tianjin TEDA	183	(24)
2012–2014	Guangzhou R&F	21	(1)
2014	→ Guangdong Sunray Cave (loan)	11	(3)
2015–2016	Shenzhen FC	18	(0)
2017	Shenzhen Pengcheng	3	(5)
2018–2019	R&F	3	(0)

International career^{‡}
2007–2009	China	5	(1)

Managerial career
- 2018–2020: R&F (Team Manager)
- 2021–2022: Meizhou Qiuxiang (assistant)
- 2023: Guangxi Lanhang (assistant)
- * Club domestic league appearances and goals as of 14 October 2020 ‡ National team caps and goals as of 4 November 2013

Wu Wei'an (simplified Chinese: 吴伟安; traditional Chinese: 吳偉安; pinyin: Wú Wěi'ān; Jyutping: Ng4 Wai5 On1; born September 1, 1981) is a Chinese football coach and former professional football player.

== Club career ==
Wu Wei'an started his career with second-tier club Guangdong Xiongying in 2002 where he established himself the following season as a team regular. However while he may have cemented himself within the team (now renaming itself Shenzhen Kejian at the start of the 2004 league season) he was unable to aid them in their promotion bid to the top tier. Tianjin TEDA however were willing to take Wu Wei'an and with the chance to play in the Chinese Super League, so he transferred to Tianjin at the beginning of the 2005 league season. With this move Wu Wei'an would rise to prominence, quickly establishing himself as a regular within the team he would play in 26 league games and score 7 goals. The following seasons would see him become a vital member of the team that would qualify for the 2009 AFC Champions League for the first time in the club's history, while also going on to play in five games and scoring one goal during the tournament. He would then see the club become runners-up of the 2010 league season while also seeing Tianjin finish in the last sixteen of the 2011 AFC Champions League where he played in four games and scored one goal. Despite these achievement Wu Wei'an did not win any trophies until the 2011 Chinese FA Cup where he came on as a late substitute as Tianjin won the cup 2–1 against Shandong Luneng Taishan.

After the win Wu Wei'an had a chance to return to Guangdong with recently promoted top-tier side Guangzhou R&F, which he decided to take at the beginning of the 2012 league season. In July 2014, Wu moved to China League One side Guangdong Sunray Cave on a six-month loan deal. He transferred to League One side Shenzhen F.C. in February 2015. Wu announced his retirement on 6 March 2017.

Wu became a basic level coach for Guangzhou R&F and played for amateur club Shenzhen Pengcheng after his retirement. He returned to professional football in July 2017 when he joined Hong Kong Premier League side R&F as a player-coach. On 9 December 2017, he made his debut for the club in a 2–1 home loss to Eastern, coming on as a substitute for Li Rui in the 65th minute. He retired after the 2018–19 season.

== International career ==
Wu Wei'an would make his senior international debut under Zhu Guanghu on February 7, 2007 in a friendly against Kazakhstan where China won 2–1 in a preparation game several mouths before the 2007 AFC Asian Cup. Wu Wei'an did not make it into the squad for the tournament but China had a new manager in Vladimir Petrović who would play him against Myanmar in a 2010 FIFA World Cup qualification game where China won 4–0 and Wu scored his debut goal. Vladimir Petrović would try him out in several further friendlies, however after an uninspired draw against El Salvador, Wu would stop being included in any further squads. A year later Gao Hongbo would be the new Chinese manager and Wu was given another chance within the national team on June 4, 2009 against Saudi Arabia but China lost 4–1 and Wu was not included in any further teams.

== Career statistics ==
=== International goals ===
Scores and results list China's goal tally first.

No	Date	Venue	Opponent	Score	Result	Competition
1.	28 October 2007	KLFA Stadium, Kuala Lumpur, Malaysia	Myanmar	1–0	4–0	2010 FIFA World Cup qualification

== Honours ==
Tianjin TEDA

- Chinese FA Cup; 2011
