= Wang Xinxin (footballer) =

Chinese footballer and coach

Wang Xinxin 王新欣
Personal information
- Date of birth: 27 April 1981 (age 45)
- Place of birth: Shenyang, Liaoning, China
- Height: 1.82 m (6 ft 0 in)
- Position: Midfielder

Youth career
- 2000–2001: Liaoning Youth

Senior career*
Years	Team	Apps	(Gls)
2002–2008	Liaoning FC	155	(30)
2005	→ Shenzhen Jianlibao (loan)	17	(2)
2009–2016	Tianjin TEDA	161	(13)
Total		333	(45)

International career^{‡}
2002–2009	China	5	(1)

Managerial career
- 2019–2020: Guizhou Hengfeng
- 2021: China U18 (assistant)
- 2025: Guangxi Lanhang
- * Club domestic league appearances and goals as of 15 July 2016 ‡ National team caps and goals as of 8 Nov 2013

Wang Xinxin (Chinese: 王新欣; pinyin: Wáng Xīnxīn; born 27 April 27, 1981, in Shenyang) is a Chinese football coach and a former international football player. He last managed China League One club Guizhou Hengfeng.

== Club career ==
Wang Xinxin started his career with Liaoning F.C., coming through their youth team and immediately established himself into the senior team in 2002 where he made twenty-five appearances and scored nine goals in his debut season. As a prolific attacking midfielder Wang would attract the interests of the reigning Chinese Super League champions Shenzhen Jianlibao, who he transferred to on loan at the beginning of the 2005 league season. At his new club he was unable to replicate the success they had from the previous season and ended the season in a disappointing twelfth. After his disappointing season with Shenzhen Jianlibao, Wang Xinxin returned to Liaoning FC where he established himself as a key member of the team for three seasons until Liaoning were relegated in the 2008 season.

Wang Xinxin would transfer to Tianjin TEDA for four million yuan in the 2009 season after they gained qualification to the AFC Champions League. Within the tournament he would play in four games as Tianjin were knocked out within the group stages, however while Wang Xinxin would become at vital member within the team the club could not replicate their previous season's results and finished in a disappointing sixth at the end of the 2009 league season. This would see former Chinese coach Arie Haan come into the team and made Wang Xinxin captain of the team. This would seem to work as Tianjin would go on to become runners-up of the 2010 league season and go on to play in the 2011 AFC Champions League where Wang Xinxin lead the team in two games as they were knocked out in the last sixteen. He fared better within the 2011 Chinese FA Cup when he guided the club to a 2–1 victory against Shandong Luneng Taishan in the final.

Wang announced his retirement in July 2016.

== Managerial career ==
On 26 November 2019, Wang was appointed as the manager of Guizhou Hengfeng.

== International career ==
After his promising start to his professional football career with Liaoning F.C., Wang would quickly draw the attentions of the China national football team with the newly appointed caretaker manager Shen Xiangfu selecting him in his first squad against Syria on 7 December 2002, in a 3–1 win where he also scored his first goal for his country. After several further friendlies, he would be dropped from the team after he was unable to replicate his goalscoring form. It was only once he joined Tianjin that he was selected for the national team once again, when the new manager Gao Hongbo came in to select him for his first squad on 29 May 2009, in a game against Germany that ended in a 1–1 draw.

== Career statistics ==
Statistics accurate as of match played 15 July 2016

Club	Season	League		FA Cup		Asia		Total	
Club	Season	Apps	Goals	Apps	Goals	Apps	Goals	Apps	Goals
Liaoning F.C.	2002	25	9			–		25	9
Liaoning F.C.	2003	26	9			–		26	9
Liaoning F.C.	2004	20	2	0	0	–		20	2
Shenzhen Jianlibao	2005	17	2	3	1	6	1	26	4
Liaoning F.C.	2006	28	2	1	0	–		29	2
Liaoning F.C.	2007	28	4	–		–		28	4
Liaoning F.C.	2008	28	4	–		–		28	4
Tianjin TEDA	2009	28	3	–		4	0	32	3
Tianjin TEDA	2010	29	3	–		–		29	3
Tianjin TEDA	2011	19	0	3	3	2	0	24	3
Tianjin TEDA	2012	30	3	1	0	5	0	36	3
Tianjin TEDA	2013	25	1	2	0	–		27	1
Tianjin TEDA	2014	22	2	0	0	–		22	2
Tianjin TEDA	2015	7	1	1	1	–		8	2
Tianjin TEDA	2016	1	0	2	1	–		3	1
Total		333	45	13	6	17	1	363	52

== Honours ==
Tianjin TEDA

- Chinese FA Cup: 2011
