= Hanghai Stadium =

Sports venue in Zhengzhou, China

Coordinates: 34°43′0″N 113°43′31″E

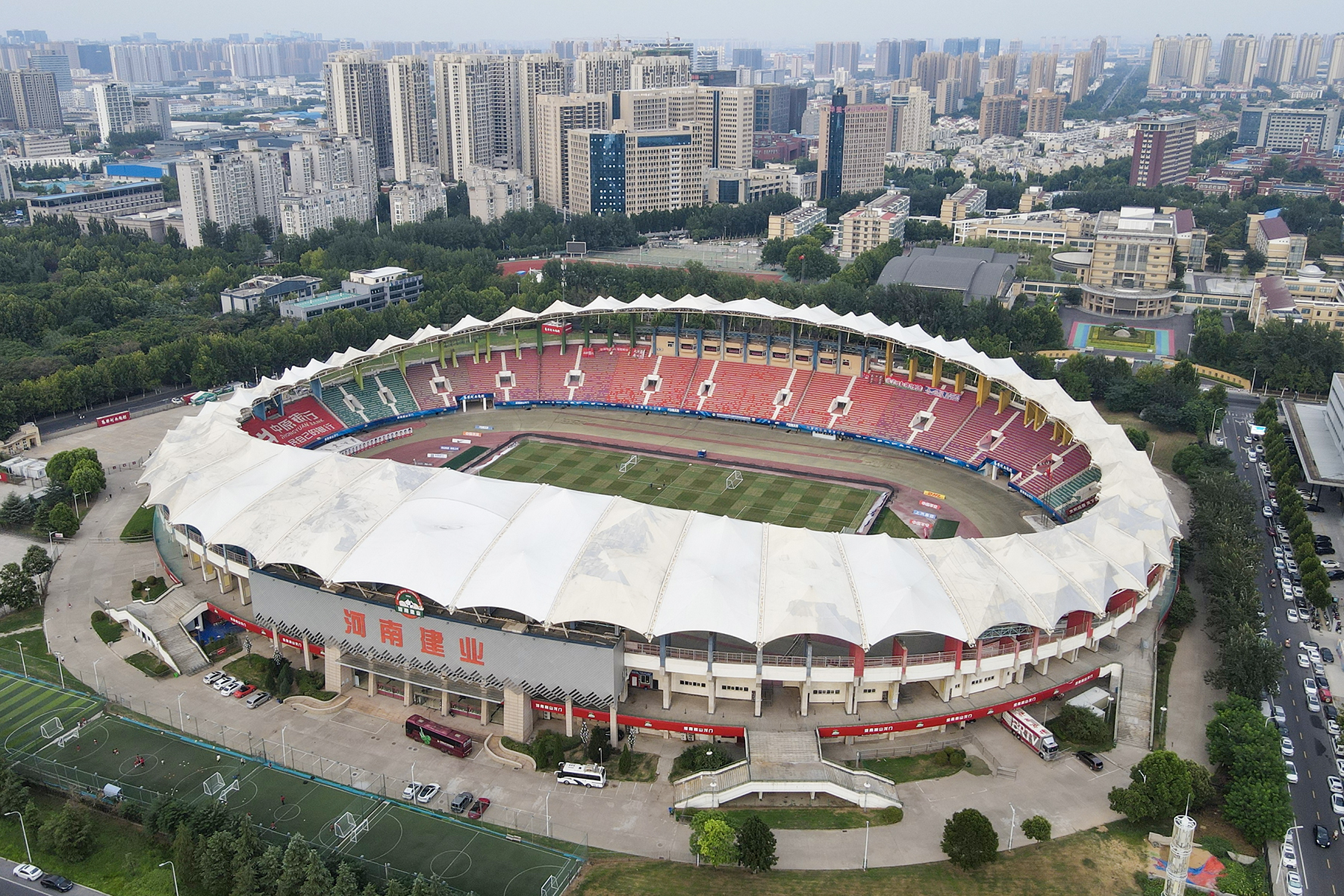
- Interactive map of Hanghai Stadium
- Location: Hanghai E. Road, Zhengzhou, Henan, China
- Owner: Central China Real Estate Limited
- Capacity: 29,860
- Public transit: 5 at Zhongyuan Tower

Construction
- Opened: September 2002

Tenant
- Henan F.C.

The Hanghai Stadium (Simplified Chinese: 郑州航海体育场) is a multi-purpose stadium in Zhengzhou, Henan, China. It is currently used mostly for football matches and athletics events. It serves as the home stadium for Henan of the Chinese Super League. The stadium has a capacity of 29,860 people. It opened in 2002.
