= 2005 Chinese Super League Cup =

CSL Cup

Tournament details
- Country: China
- Teams: 14

Final positions
- Champions: Wuhan Huanghelou (1st title)
- Runners-up: Shenzhen Jianlibao

Tournament statistics
- Matches played: 26
- Goals scored: 83 (3.19 per match)
- Top goal scorer(s): (Brazil) Gílson (China) Zheng Zhi (4 goals)

The 2005 Chinese Super League Cup (Chinese: 2005中国足球协会超级联赛杯) was the second and the last edition of Chinese Super League Cup.

== Results ==
=== First round ===
==== First leg ====
| 17 May | Qingdao Jonoon | 0–1 | Dalian Shide | Tiantai Stadium, Qingdao |
| 15:30 | | | Wang Sheng 35' |

| 18 May | Wuhan Tianlong Huanghelou | 1–0 | Tianjin Master Kong | Xinhua Road Sports Center, Wuhan |
| 15:30 | Wang Xiaoshi 61' |

| 18 May | Chongqing Lifan | 5–1 | Sichuan Guancheng | Yanghe Stadium, Chongqing |
| 17:00 | Li Guoxu 16'; Zhou Lin 24'; Huang Xiyang 53', 59'; Wang Xiang 75' | | Wang Peng 29' |

| 18 May | Shenyang Ginde | 1–3 | Liaoning Zhongyu | Wulihe Stadium, Shenyang |
| 19:35 | Wang Qiang 25' | | Guo Hui 63', 72'; Yang Xu 81' |

| 18 May | Beijing Hyundai | 1–0 | Inter Shanghai | Workers' Stadium, Beijing |
| 19:45 | Yang Pu 75' |

| 19 May | Shanghai Zobon | 1–4 | Shanghai Shenhua SVA | Yuanshen Stadium, Shanghai |
| 15:30 | Gao Wanguo 2' | | Yu Tao 6', 45'; Martínez 44'; Xiao Zhanbo 52' |

==== Second leg ====
| 28 May | Inter Shanghai | 2–1 (2–2 (a) agg.) | Beijing Hyundai | Shanghai Stadium, Shanghai |
| 20:05 | Ayew 32'; Bulat 74' | | Lu Jiang 5' |

| 29 May | Dalian Shide | 3–4 (4–4 (a) agg.) | Qingdao Jonoon | Jinzhou Stadium, Dalian |
| 14:30 | Yan Song 7'; Ji Mingyi 12'; Zou Jie 75' | | Qu Bo 20'; Liu Jian 56', 69'; Jiang Ning 90+1' |

| 29 May | Shanghai Shenhua SVA | 3–1 (7–2 agg.) | Shanghai Zobon | Jiading Stadium, Shanghai |
| 15:00 | Sun Ji 37'; Xiao Zhanbo 63' (pen.); Sun Xiang 71' | | Yang Lin 80' |

| 29 May | Liaoning Zhongyu | 0–0 (3–1 agg.) | Shenyang Ginde | Yingkou Stadium, Yingkou |
| 15:05 |

| 29 May | Sichuan Guancheng | 3–3 (4–8 agg.) | Chongqing Lifan | Longquanyi Football Stadium, Chengdu |
| 16:30 | Yang Pengfeng 20', 54'; Zou Yougen 30' | | Li Guoxu 32', 60'; Sun Zhi 66' |

| 29 May | Tianjin Master Kong | 1–0 (a.e.t.) (1–1 agg.) (4–5 p) | Wuhan Tianlong Huanghelou | Minyuan Stadium, Tianjin |
| 19:30 | Lu Yan 79' |
| | Penalties |
| | Han Yanming (penalty scored); Zhang Shuo (penalty scored); Mnguni (penalty scored); Zorić (penalty scored); Wu Weian (penalty missed); Lu Yan (penalty missed) | | (penalty scored) Liu Zhiming; (penalty missed) Mo Jiasheng; (penalty scored) Di You; (penalty scored) Wang Xiaoshi; (penalty scored) Zhou Yi; (penalty scored) Fang Li |

=== Second round ===
==== First leg ====
| 5 June | Qingdao Jonoon | 4–1 | Wuhan Tianlong Huanghelou | Tiantai Stadium, Qingdao |
| 15:30 | Qu Bo 9', 65'; Liu Jian 51'; Jiang Ning 76' | | Wang Xiaoshi 53' |

| 5 June | Chongqing Lifan | 0–2 | Shanghai Shenhua SVA | Bishan Stadium, Chongqing |
| 15:30 | | | Martínez 6'; Xie Hui 90' |

| 5 June | Liaoning Zhongyu | 1–4 | Shenzhen Jianlibao | Yingkou Stadium, Yingkou |
| 15:30 | Guo Hui 72' | | Xin Feng 3'; Yang Chen 14'; Lu Bofei 55'; Li Ming 70' |

| 5 June | Beijing Hyundai | 2–2 | Shandong Luneng Taishan | Workers' Stadium, Beijing |
| 19:30 | Sui Dongliang 80'; Jelić 81' | | Li Jinyu 70'; Han Peng 76' |

==== Second leg ====
| 12 June | Shenzhen Jianlibao | 3–2 (7–3 agg.) | Liaoning Zhongyu | Shenzhen Stadium, Shenzhen |
| 15:30 | Xue Shen 20'; Lu Bofei 53'; Huang Fengtao 56' | | Chen Xing 76'; Yang Xu 88' |

| 12 June | Wuhan Tianlong Huanghelou | 4–0 (5–4 agg.) | Qingdao Jonoon | Xinhua Road Sports Center, Wuhan |
| 16:00 | Vicente 22'; Gílson 60' (pen.), 74'; Wu Peng 85' |

| 12 June | Shandong Luneng Taishan | 3–2 (5–4 agg.) | Beijing Hyundai | Shandong Provincial Stadium, Jinan |
| 19:30 | Zheng Zhi 45', 61', 70' | | Jelić 8'; Xu Yunlong 59' |

| 12 June | Shanghai Shenhua SVA | 2–1 (4–1 agg.) | Chongqing Lifan | Hongkou Football Stadium, Shanghai |
| 19:45 | Min Jin 32'; Martínez 80' | | Liu Jialin 30' |

=== Semi-finals ===
==== First leg ====
| 8 October | Wuhan Tianlong Huanghelou | 0–1 | Shandong Luneng Taishan | Xinhua Road Sports Center, Wuhan |
| 15:30 | | | Zheng Zhi 77' (pen.) |

| 8 October | Shanghai Shenhua SVA | 0–1 | Shenzhen Jianlibao | Hongkou Football Stadium, Shanghai |
| 19:30 | | | Yang Chen 45' |

==== Second leg ====
| 16 October | Shenzhen Jianlibao | 2–2 (3–2 agg.) | Shanghai Shenhua SVA | Shenzhen Stadium, Shenzhen |
| 15:30 | Zhou Ting 23', 90+3' | | Sun Ji 8'; Xie Hui 65' |

| 16 October | Shandong Luneng Taishan | 0–1 (a.e.t.) (1–1 agg.) (3–4 p) | Wuhan Tianlong Huanghelou | Shandong Provincial Stadium, Jinan |
| 19:30 | | | Gílson 85' |
| | Penalties |
| | Pažin (penalty scored); Shu Chang (penalty scored); Han Peng (penalty missed); Jiao Zhe (penalty missed); Zheng Zhi (penalty scored) | | (penalty scored) Gílson; (penalty scored) Li Hao; (penalty scored) Zhou Yi; (penalty missed) Wang Wenhua; (penalty scored) Zheng Bin |

=== Final ===
==== First leg ====
12 November
15:35

| Shenzhen Jianlibao | 1 - 1 | Wuhan Tianlong Huanghelou |
|---|---|---|
| Zhang Yonghai 40' | | Cai Xi 48' |

Shenzhen Stadium, Shenzhen

Shenzhen:
| GK | 19 | (China) Li Leilei |
| CB | 5 | (China) Li Weifeng (c) |
| CB | 8 | (China) Zhang Yonghai |
| CB | 30 | (Poland) Marek Zając |
| RWB | 14 | (China) Li Jianhua |
| LWB | 12 | (China) Zhou Ting |
| CM | 13 | (China) Li Fei |
| CM | 22 | (China) Yuan Lin |
| CM | 29 | (China) Lu Bofei | (substituted off) 76' |
| SS | 7 | (Togo) Djima Oyawolé |
| ST | 9 | (China) Li Yi |
Substitutes used:
| FW | 3 | (China) Yang Chen | (substituted on) 76' |
Coach:
(China) Xie Feng (caretaker)

Wuhan:
| GK | 22 | (China) Wang Yu | (yellow card) 90+3' |
| CB | 4 | (China) Cai Xi | (yellow card) 56' |
| CB | 9 | (China) Li Hao |
| CB | 31 | (China) Mo Jiasheng |
| DM | 14 | (China) Zhou Yi |
| DM | 25 | (China) Hu Zhuowei |
| RM | 23 | (China) Wang Wenhua | | (substituted off) 81' |
| LM | 20 | (China) Wang Xinxin |
| AM | 8 | (China) Zheng Bin (c) |
| SS | 30 | (Brazil) Vicente | | (substituted off) 88' |
| ST | 29 | (Brazil) Gílson | | (substituted off) 71' |
Substitutes used:
| DF | 12 | (China) Wang Xiaoshi | | (substituted on) 88' |
| DF | 17 | (China) Ai Zhibo | | (substituted on) 81' |
| FW | 26 | (China) Yao Hanlin | | (substituted on) 71' |
Coach:
(China) Chen Fangping

==== Second leg ====
19 November
15:00

| Wuhan Tianlong Huanghelou | 2 - 0 | Shenzhen Jianlibao |
|---|---|---|
| Gílson 67'; Vicente 69' |

Wuhan Sports Center Stadium, Wuhan

Wuhan:
| GK | 24 | (China) Zeng Cheng |
| CB | 2 | (China) Yang Kunpeng |
| CB | 4 | (China) Cai Xi |
| CB | 9 | (China) Li Hao |
| DM | 14 | (China) Zhou Yi |
| DM | 25 | (China) Hu Zhuowei |
| RM | 23 | (China) Wang Wenhua |
| LM | 20 | (China) Wang Xinxin |
| AM | 8 | (China) Zheng Bin (c) |
| SS | 30 | (Brazil) Vicente |
| ST | 29 | (Brazil) Gílson | (substituted off) 81' |
Substitutes used
| DF | 17 | (China) Ai Zhibo | (substituted on) 81' |
Coach:
(China) Chen Fangping

Shenzhen:
| GK | 19 | (China) Li Leilei |
| CB | 5 | (China) Li Weifeng (c) |
| CB | 8 | (China) Zhang Yonghai | (yellow card) 70' |
| CB | 30 | (Poland) Marek Zając |
| RWB | 14 | (China) Li Jianhua |
| LWB | 12 | (China) Zhou Ting | (yellow card) 56' (yellow-red card) 90+3' |
| CM | 13 | (China) Li Fei | | (substituted off) 73' |
| CM | 28 | (China) Xin Feng | | (substituted off) 42' |
| CM | 29 | (China) Lu Bofei |
| SS | 7 | (Togo) Djima Oyawolé | (yellow card) 88' |
| ST | 9 | (China) Li Yi | (yellow card) 32' |
Substitutes used:
| DF | 22 | (China) Yuan Lin | | (substituted on) 42' |
| MF | 6 | (China) Huang Yunfeng | | (substituted on) 73' |
Coach:
(China) Xie Feng (caretaker)

== See also ==
- 2005 Chinese FA Cup
