= 2007 Chinese Super League =

Chinese Super League
- Season: 2007
- Champions: Changchun Yatai
- Relegated: Xiamen Lanshi
- AFC Champions League: Changchun Yatai; Beijing Guoan
- Matches: 210
- Goals: 468 (2.23 per match)
- Top goalscorer: Li Jinyu (15 goals)
- Average attendance: 15,112

The 2007 Chinese Super League season or the Kingway Chinese Super League, as it was known for sponsorship reasons, was the fourth edition since its establishment, the 14th season of professional football as well as being the 46th top-tier league season in China. The league started on March 3 and ended on November 14. Changchun Yatai clinched the league title for the first time in the last game of the season, while Xiamen Lanshi was relegated with two games to spare. Coincidentally, both of these teams were promoted in the previous season.

The champions as well as the runner-up of the league would qualify for the 2008 AFC Champions League as was the same from the previous season. The Chinese FA Cup was canceled due to the intended expansion of the league to 16 teams, however Shanghai United and Shanghai Shenhua merged, which saw the Chinese Football Association decide to leave the league with 15 teams for the season.

== Promotion and relegation ==
Teams promoted from the 2006 China League One

- Henan Jianye
- Zhejiang Lucheng

Teams relegated from the 2006 Chinese Super League

- Chongqing Lifan

== Pre-season change ==
Zhu Jun, the owner of Shanghai United, bought a majority share of their crosstown rival. The 7th placed team of the previous season, Shanghai United was merged into two times CSL runner-up Shanghai Shenhua. The new team play under the name Shanghai Shenhua United but use the stadium of the former Shanghai United – Yuanshen Sports Centre Stadium in Pudong, Shanghai as their home ground.

== Clubs ==
Club	Chinese name	Seasons in CSL	Best finish, Season	Worst finish, Season
Beijing Guoan	北京国安	2004 to 2007	3rd, 2006	7th, 2004
Changchun Yatai	长春亚泰	2006 & 2007	4th, 2006	4th, 2006
Changsha Ginde	长沙金德	2004 to 2007	8th, 2004	13th, 2005 & 2006
Dalian Shide	大连实德	2004 to 2007	1st, 2005	5th, 2004 & 2006
Henan Jianye	河南建业	2007	N/A	N/A
Liaoning Zhongyu	辽宁足球俱乐部	2004 to 2007	4th, 2004	12th, 2006
Qingdao Zhongneng	青岛中能	2004 to 2007	7th, 2005	14th, 2006
Shaanxi Baorong	陕西宝荣	2004 to 2007	3rd, 2004	8th, 2005
Shandong Luneng	山东鲁能泰山	2004 to 2007	1st, 2006	3rd, 2005
Shanghai Shenhua	上海申花	2004 to 2007	2nd, 2005 & 2006	10th, 2004
Shenzhen Shangqingyin	深圳上清饮	2004 to 2007	1st, 2004	12th, 2005
Tianjin TEDA	天津泰达	2004 to 2007	4th, 2005	6th, 2004 & 2006
Wuhan Guanggu	武汉光谷	2005 to 2007	5th, 2005	10th, 2006
Xiamen Lanshi	厦门蓝狮	2006 & 2007	8th, 2006	8th, 2006
Zhejiang Lucheng	浙江绿城	2007	N/A	N/A

=== Personnel ===
Team	Manager
Beijing Guoan	(South Korea) Lee Jang-soo
Changchun Yatai	(China) Gao Hongbo
Changsha Ginde	(Serbia) Milan Živadinović
Dalian Shide	(Netherlands) Jo Bonfrère
Henan Jianye	(China) Pei Encai
Liaoning Zhongyu	(China) Tang Yaodong
Qingdao Zhongneng	(China) Yin Tiesheng
Shaanxi Baorong	(China) Cheng Yaodong
Shandong Luneng	(Serbia) Ljubiša Tumbaković
Shanghai Shenhua	(China) Wu Jingui
Shenzhen Shangqingyin	(China) Zhang Jun
Tianjin TEDA	(Czech Republic) Jozef Jarabinský
Wuhan Guanggu	(China) Chen Fangping
Xiamen Lanshi	(China) Gao Daming
Zhejiang Lucheng	(China) Zhou Sui'an

=== Foreign players ===
The number of foreign players is restricted to four, but all teams can only use three foreign players on the field in each game. Players from Hong Kong, Macau and Chinese Taipei are deemed to be native players in CSL.

- Players name in **bold** indicates the player is registered during the mid-season transfer window.
- Players in italics were out of the squad or left the club within the season, after the pre-season transfer window, or in the mid-season transfer window, and at least had one appearance.

Club	Player 1	Player 2	Player 3	Player 4	Former players
Beijing Guoan	(Brazil) Aderaldo	(Brazil) **Alysson**	(Honduras) **Luis Santamaría**	(Honduras) Walter Martínez	(Brazil) Tiago (Serbia) Miodrag Pantelić
Changchun Yatai	(Bulgaria) **Svetoslav Petrov**	(Honduras) Elvis Scott	(Honduras) Samuel Caballero	(Ivory Coast) **Guillaume Dah Zadi**	
Changsha Ginde	(Brazil) **Sandro**	(Cameroon) Aboubakar Oumarou	(Montenegro) Čedomir Mijanović		(Nigeria) Garba Lawal (Serbia) Saša Zorić
Dalian Shide	(Bulgaria) Zoran Janković	(Cameroon) **Patrick Mevoungou**	(Serbia) Darko Drinić	(Serbia) **Miodrag Anđelković**	
Henan Jianye	(Bulgaria) Ivo Trenchev	(The Gambia) Arthur Gómez	(Guadeloupe) **Olivier Fauconnier**	(Tunisia) Imed Ben Younes	(Slovenia) Darko Kremenović
Liaoning Zhongyu	(Australia) Ryan Griffiths	(Cameroon) Clément Lebe	(Ukraine) Viktor Brovchenko		
Qingdao Zhongneng	(Bosnia and Herzegovina) **Damir Ibrić**	(Croatia) Igor Budiša	(Nigeria) **Benedict Akwuegbu**	(Romania) Dumitru Mitu	(Portugal) Joca (Serbia) Dejan Sarić
Shaanxi Baorong	(Brazil) Rafael Scheidt	(Brazil) **Ronny**	(Brazil) Sérgio Júnior	(Uruguay) **Juan Manuel Olivera**	(Croatia) Ivan Bulat
Shandong Luneng	(Bulgaria) Predrag Pažin	(Serbia) Aleksandar Živković	(Serbia) Nikola Malbaša		(Serbia) Branko Baković
Shanghai Shenhua	(Colombia) **Hámilton Ricard**	(Honduras) **Saúl Martínez**	(Uruguay) **Diego Alonso**	(Uruguay) Sergio Blanco	(Brazil) Ronny (France) Laurent Leroy (Uruguay) Fernando Correa
Shenzhen Shangqingyin	(Ivory Coast) **Bamba Moussa**	(Paraguay) **Michael Valenzuela**	(Poland) Bogdan Zając	(Poland) Marek Zając	(Ivory Coast) **Dramane Kamaté**
Tianjin TEDA	(Brazil) Charles Chad	(Croatia) Darko Matić	(Croatia) **Jurica Vučko**	(Nigeria) **Henry Makinwa**	(Serbia) Vidak Bratić
Wuhan Guanggu	(Brazil) Bruno Lança	(Brazil) Gilsinho	(Brazil) Roberto Aleixo	(Brazil) Vicente	
Xiamen Lanshi	(Angola) Quinzinho	(Nigeria) Gabriel Melkam	(Serbia) Branko Jelić	(Serbia) **Saša Zorić**	
Zheijang Lucheng	(Brazil) Argel Fuchs	(Brazil) Marcelo Rosa	(Brazil) **Tico**	(Brazil) Wágner	(Brazil) Eduardo Marques

Hong Kong/Chinese Taipei/Macau players (doesn't count on the foreign player slot)

Club	Player 1
Shanghai Shenhua	(Hong Kong) Ng Wai Chiu

== League table ==
Pos	Team	Pld	W	D	L	GF	GA	GD	Pts	Qualification or relegation
1	Changchun Yatai (C)	28	16	7	5	48	25	+23	55	Qualification to AFC Champions League qualification
2	Beijing Guoan	28	15	9	4	45	19	+26	54	Qualification to AFC Champions League qualification
3	Shandong Luneng	28	14	6	8	53	29	+24	48	
4	Shanghai Shenhua	28	12	10	6	35	29	+6	46	
5	Dalian Shide	28	11	11	6	36	31	+5	44	
6	Tianjin TEDA	28	12	8	8	31	22	+9	44	
7	Wuhan Guanggu	28	11	7	10	29	31	−2	40	
8	Qingdao Zhongneng	28	10	6	12	36	42	−6	36	
9	Liaoning Zhongyu	28	9	8	11	26	36	−10	35	
10	Changsha Ginde	28	8	10	10	17	24	−7	34	
11	Zhejiang Lucheng	28	6	10	12	25	35	−10	28	
12	Henan Jianye	28	5	12	11	20	28	−8	27	
13	Shaanxi Baorong	28	4	14	10	24	29	−5	26	
14	Shenzhen Shangqingyin	28	5	10	13	21	42	−21	25	
15	Xiamen Lanshi (R)	28	4	8	16	22	46	−24	20	Relegation to League One

Source: League Table 2007
(C) Champions; (R) Relegated

== Top scorers ==
Rank	Scorer	Club	Goals
1	(China) Li Jinyu	Shandong Luneng	15
2	(China) Han Peng	Shandong Luneng	13
3	(Honduras) Elvis Scott	Changchun Yatai	12
4	(Brazil) Tiago	Beijing Guoan	10
4	(Ivory Coast) Guillaume Dah Zadi	Changchun Yatai	10
6	(China) Du Zhenyu	Changchun Yatai	9
7	(China) Liu Jian	Qingdao Zhongneng	8
7	(China) Tao Wei	Beijing Guoan	8
7	(China) Yan Xiangchuang	Beijing Guoan	8

== Attendances ==
=== League attendance ===
- Total attendance: 3,173,500
- Average attendance: 15,112

=== Clubs attendance ===
Football club	Average attendance
Shaanxi Baorong	24,643
Shandong Luneng	22,607
Beijing Guoan	21,571
Zhejiang Lucheng	19,571
Henan Jianye	16,857
Changchun Yatai	16,429
Liaoning Zhongyu	15,929
Tianjin TEDA	15,429
Wuhan Guanggu	13,179
Shenzhen Shangqingyin	13,000
Shanghai Shenhua	11,393
Changsha Ginde	10,571
Dalian Shide	10,286
Xiamen Lanshi	8,036
Qingdao Zhongneng	7,179

== Awards ==
- Chinese Football Association Footballer of the Year: (China) Du Zhenyu (Changchun Yatai)
- Chinese Super League Golden Boot Winner: (China) Li Jinyu (Shandong Luneng)
- Chinese Football Association Young Player of the Year: (China) Hao Junmin (Tianjin TEDA)
- Chinese Football Association Manager of the Year: (China) Gao Hongbo (Changchun Yatai)
- Chinese Football Association Referee of the Year: (China) Sun Baojie
- Chinese Super League Fair Play Award: Dalian Shide, Tianjin TEDA, Beijing Guoan

== See also ==
- Chinese Super League
- Football in China
- Chinese Football Association
- China League One
- China League Two
- Chinese FA Cup
