= Yao Hanlin =

Chinese footballer

Yao Hanlin 姚翰林
Personal information
- Date of birth: 16 April 1985 (age 41)
- Place of birth: Wuhan, Hubei, China
- Height: 1.72 m (5 ft 8 in)
- Position: Midfielder

Senior career*
Years	Team	Apps	(Gls)
2004–2008	Wuhan Guanggu	38	(0)
2009	Jiangsu Sainty	28	(0)
2010–2021	Wuhan FC	234	(38)

Managerial career
- 2024-: Wuhan Jiangda WFC (assistant)
- * Club domestic league appearances and goals as of 3 January 2022

Yao Hanlin (Chinese: 姚翰林, born 16 April 1985 in Wuhan) is a Chinese football coach and retired professional footballer who played as a midfielder. He spent almost his entire playing career at his hometown Wuhan, first at Wuhan Guanggu from 2004 to their disbandment in 2008, and then Wuhan Zall from 2010 to 2022, where he served as long-time captain for the latter.

== Club career ==
Yao Hanlin began his professional football career in 2004 when he was promoted to the senior team of second tier club Wuhan Guanggu by Head coach Pei Encai and was part of the squad that won the division title and promotion to the top tier. The following seasons he would gain more playing time and was often deployed as a substitute until the team were disbanded during the 2008 league season after the club had a dispute with the Chinese Football Association over their on-field behaviour after the club's management did not accept the punishment given to them by the Chinese Football Association after a scuffle broke out during a league game against Beijing Guoan on 27 September 2008. With several other Wuhan players he would transfer to the newly promoted side Jiangsu Sainty at the beginning of the 2009 league season to join up with his former manager Pei Encai. His time at Jiangsu saw him become an integral member within the side and he would personally make 28 league appearances before he had a chance to return Hubei with second tier club Hubei Oriental at the beginning of the 2010 league season.

As the club renamed themselves Wuhan Zall, Yao would be an integral member of the squad that came runners-up within the division and gain promotion to the top tier. After only one season within the top flight the club were relegated at the end of the 2013 Chinese Super League season. Yao would remain an integral member of the squad until the club eventually won promotion again by winning the 2018 China League One division.

Yao retired at the end of the 2021 season. Wuhan announced that the club will retire Yao's No.8 shirt number, which was the first time a shirt number was retired for a player in the history of Chinese professional football (Many Chinese clubs had retired their No.12 shirt number as a dedication to supporters).

== Career statistics ==
Statistics accurate as of match played 3 January 2022.

Appearances and goals by club, season and competition
Club	Season	League			National Cup		League Cup		Continental		Other		Total	
Club	Season	Division	Apps	Goals	Apps	Goals	Apps	Goals	Apps	Goals	Apps	Goals	Apps	Goals
Wuhan Guanggu	2004	Jia B League	1	0	0	0	-		-		-		1	0
Wuhan Guanggu	2005	Chinese Super League	14	0	0	0	1	0	-		-		15	0
Wuhan Guanggu	2006	Chinese Super League	11	0	1	0	-		-		-		12	0
Wuhan Guanggu	2007	Chinese Super League	8	0	-		-		-		-		8	0
Wuhan Guanggu	2008	Chinese Super League	4	0	-		-		-		-		4	0
Wuhan Guanggu	Total		38	0	1	0	1	0	0	0	0	0	40	0
Jiangsu Sainty	2009	Chinese Super League	28	0	-		-		-		-		28	0
Wuhan Zall	2010	China League One	24	5	-		-		-		-		24	5
Wuhan Zall	2011	China League One	25	4	0	0	-		-		-		25	4
Wuhan Zall	2012	China League One	24	4	0	0	-		-		-		24	4
Wuhan Zall	2013	Chinese Super League	18	2	0	0	-		-		-		18	2
Wuhan Zall	2014	China League One	27	5	0	0	-		-		-		27	5
Wuhan Zall	2015	China League One	28	5	0	0	-		-		-		28	5
Wuhan Zall	2016	China League One	24	4	0	0	-		-		-		24	4
Wuhan Zall	2017	China League One	28	6	0	0	-		-		-		28	6
Wuhan Zall	2018	China League One	27	3	0	0	-		-		-		27	3
Wuhan Zall	2019	Chinese Super League	5	0	0	0	-		-		-		5	0
Wuhan Zall	2020	Chinese Super League	3	0	3	1	-		-		0 (Note: Appearance(s) in CSL Relegation play-offs)	0	6	0
Wuhan Zall	2021	Chinese Super League	1	0	1	0	-		-		-		2	0
Wuhan Zall	Total		234	38	4	1	0	0	0	0	0	0	238	39
Career total			300	38	5	1	1	0	0	0	0	0	306	39

== Honours ==
=== Club ===
Wuhan Guanggu

- Chinese Football Association Jia League: 2004
- Chinese Super League Cup: 2005

Wuhan Zall

- China League One: 2018

Sporting positions
Preceded by Cai Xi	Wuhan Zall captain 2011	Succeeded by Mei Fang
Preceded by Ai Zhibo	Wuhan Zall captain 2016–2021	Succeeded by Incumbent
