= 2006 Chinese Super League =

Chinese Super League
- Season: 2006
- Champions: Shandong Luneng
- Relegated: Chongqing Lifan
- AFC Champions League: Shandong Luneng; Shanghai Shenhua
- A3 Champions Cup: Shandong Luneng; Shanghai Shenhua
- Matches: 210
- Goals: 496 (2.36 per match)
- Top goalscorer: Li Jinyu (26 goals)
- Average attendance: 10,611

The 2006 Chinese Super League was the third season since the establishment of the Chinese Football Association Super League (中国足球协会超级联赛 or 中超), also known as Chinese Super League, the thirteenth season of professional association football league and the 45th top-tier league season in China. The premier football league in China under the auspices of the Chinese Football Association, the season started on March 11, 2006 and ended on October 22. Initially, it was planned that there would be two teams relegated at the end of the season, however this was changed to one when Sichuan First City folded before the start of the season.

== Promotion and relegation ==
Teams promoted from 2005 China League One

- Xiamen Lanshi
- Changchun Yatai

Teams relegated after end of 2005 Chinese Super League

- None

== Overview ==
=== Preseason ===
A number of changes occurred during the off season, notably some major changes to the teams. Inter Shanghai moved to Xi'an and was renamed Xi'an Chanba. Shanghai Zobon was renamed Shanghai United.

Beijing Hyundai, who did not renew their contract with Hyundai, changed their team name back to their formal name, Beijing Guoan.

Shenzhen Jianlibao changed its team name to Shenzhen Kingway after finding a new sponsor in Kingway Brewery.

There was also some speculation that Liaoning would pull out from the league, and that the Chinese Football Association had prepared a schedule with only 14 teams should Liaoning have withdrawn.

The biggest shock was the disbanding of Sichuan First City in January, so the league will only have 15 teams at the start of the season, one short of the 16 teams planned.

=== Player transfers ===
Shanghai Shenhua, who qualified for the AFC Champions League, boost their squad with Li Weifeng from the debt-ridden Shenzhen Jianlibao for 6.5 million RMB, the highest transfer fee a club has ever received that season. In addition, Shenhua bought over Liu Yunfei from Tianjin TEDA for 0.9 million and recalled defender Du Wei from Celtic.

Desperately in need of money, Shenzhen was also forced to sell China's first choice goalkeeper, Li Leilei to Shandong Luneng for 5 million, former national striker Yang Chen to the newly promoted Xiamen Lanshi for 2 million and Zhou Ting to Beijing Guoan for 3.5 million.

Other notable transfers included Wang Liang's 5 million move from Liaoning to Shandong, An Qi's 4 million move from defending champions Dalian Shide to Xiamen, and four players from Shandong (An Shuai, Zhou Yi, Sun Bing, and Cha Kejun) to Qingdao Jonoon for 1 million each.

=== The season ===
Shandong Luneng and newcomer Changchun Yatai both had a good spell early on while defending champions Dalian Shide struggled early on. During the mid season, Changchun finally cannot kept up with the pace of the top league and gradually drops to fourth in the league. Meanwhile, a record 13 league win in a row saw Shandong gaining an unassailable lead at the top. With Shandong the clear winner, the interest in the second half of the season was the race to the second place and the fight against relegation.

In the end, Chongqing Lifan were relegated with two games to go while the race for second went all the way down to the wire before Shanghai Shenhua clinch the second spot with a last day win over Liaoning while Beijing Guoan slips.

== Personnel ==
Team	Manager
Beijing Guoan	(China) Shen Xiangfu
Changchun Yatai	(Netherlands) Arie Schans
Chongqing Lifan	(Croatia) Stjepan Čordaš
Dalian Shide	(Serbia and Montenegro) Vladimir Petrović
Liaoning	(China) Tang Yaodong
Qingdao Jonoon	(China) Yin Tiesheng
Shandong Luneng	(Serbia and Montenegro) Ljubiša Tumbaković
Shanghai Shenhua	(China) Wu Jingui
Shanghai United	(Uruguay) Osvaldo Giménez
Shenyang Ginde	(Netherlands) Martin Koopman
Shenzhen Kingway	(China) Xie Feng
Tianjin TEDA	(China) Liu Chunming
Wuhan Optics Valley	(China) Pei Encai
Xi'an Chanba	(China) Cheng Yaodong
Xiamen Lanshi	(China) Gao Hongbo

== Foreign players ==
The number of foreign players is restricted to three, but all teams can only use two foreign players on the field in each game. Players from Hong Kong, Macau and Chinese Taipei are deemed to be native players in CSL.

- Players name in **bold** indicates the player is registered during the mid-season transfer window.
- Players in italics were out of the squad or left the club within the season, after the pre-season transfer window, or in the mid-season transfer window, and at least had one appearance.

Club	Player 1	Player 2	Player 3	Former players
Beijing Guoan	(Argentina) Javier Musa	(Bolivia) Milton Coimbra	(Hungary) Krisztián Kenesei	
Changchun Yatai	(Honduras) Elvis Scott	(Honduras) Samuel Caballero	(Romania) **Marian Aliuță**	(Honduras) Víctor Mena
Chongqing Lifan	(Nigeria) **Ortega Deniran**	(Serbia) **Pavle Delibašić**		(Croatia) Darko Čordaš (Serbia) Velibor Kopunović
Dalian Shide	(Bulgaria) Zoran Janković	(Serbia) Miodrag Pantelić		
Liaoning	(Cameroon) Clément Lebe	(Ukraine) **Viktor Brovchenko**		
Qingdao Jonoon	(Brazil) **Fabiano**	(Serbia) **Despot Višković**	(Serbia) **Velibor Kopunović**	
Shandong Luneng	(Bulgaria) Predrag Pažin	(Montenegro) **Igor Gluščević**	(Serbia) Aleksandar Živković	
Shanghai Shenhua	(Germany) **Carsten Jancker**	(Honduras) Luis Ramírez	(Serbia) Ivan Jovanović	(Brazil) Hilton Mineiro
Shanghai United	(Brazil) Aderaldo	(Brazil) Tiago	(Honduras) Saúl Martínez	(Brazil) Jonas (Brazil) Renato Ribas (Cameroon) Christian Pouga
Shenyang Ginde	(Brazil) **Alex Alves**	(Slovenia) Blaž Puc		(Brazil) Taílson (Guinea) Ousmane Bangoura
Shenzhen Kingway	(Cameroon) Daniel Wansi	(Poland) Bogdan Zając	(Poland) Marek Zając	
Tianjin TEDA	(Brazil) Marcos Aurélio	(Nigeria) **Benedict Akwuegbu**	(Serbia) Marko Zorić	
Wuhan Optics Valley	(Argentina) **Roberto Demus**	(Brazil) Carlos Eduardo	(Brazil) Rafael Jaques	(Brazil) Fabiano
Xi'an Chanba	(Brazil) Vicente	(Croatia) Ivan Bulat	(Ghana) Kwame Ayew	
Xiamen Lanshi	(Angola) Quinzinho	(Nigeria) **Gabriel Melkam**	(Serbia) Branko Jelić	(Serbia) Saša Zimonjić

Hong Kong/Chinese Taipei/Macau players (doesn't count on the foreign player slot)

Club	Player 1
Shanghai Shenhua	(Hong Kong) Ng Wai Chiu

== League table ==
Pos	Team	Pld	W	D	L	GF	GA	GD	Pts	Qualification or relegation
1	Shandong Luneng (C)	28	22	3	3	74	26	+48	69	Qualification for AFC Champions League
2	Shanghai Shenhua	28	14	10	4	37	19	+18	52	Qualification for AFC Champions League
3	Beijing Guoan	28	13	10	5	27	16	+11	49	
4	Changchun Yatai	28	13	7	8	41	26	+15	46	
5	Dalian Shide	28	13	6	9	43	29	+14	45	
6	Tianjin TEDA	28	10	10	8	40	38	+2	40	
7	Shanghai United	28	9	12	7	32	25	+7	39	
8	Xiamen Lanshi	28	9	11	8	28	27	+1	38	
9	Xi'an Chanba	28	8	12	8	33	34	−1	36	
10	Wuhan Optics Valley	28	8	7	13	28	42	−14	31	
11	Shenzhen Kingway	28	8	6	14	22	42	−20	30	
12	Liaoning	28	6	8	14	24	42	−18	26	
13	Shenyang Ginde	28	6	8	14	22	43	−21	26	
14	Qingdao Jonoon	28	6	7	15	25	36	−11	25	
15	Chongqing Lifan (R)	28	3	7	18	20	51	−31	16	Relegation to League One

Source: League Table 2006
(C) Champions; (R) Relegated

== Top scorers ==
Rank	Scorer	Club	Goals
1	(China) Li Jinyu	Shandong Luneng	26
2	(China) Zheng Zhi	Shandong Luneng	21
3	(Honduras) Luis Ramírez	Shanghai Shenhua	13
4	(Brazil) Vicente	Xi'an Chanba	11
5	(Bulgaria) Zoran Janković	Dalian Shide	10
5	(China) Han Peng	Shandong Luneng	10
5	(China) Zou Yougen	Xiamen Lanshi	10

== Attendances ==
=== League ===
- Total attendance: 2,228,300
- Average attendance: 10,611

=== Clubs ===
Football club	Average attendance
Shandong Luneng	30,679
Tianjin TEDA	18,071
Xi'an Chanba	17,286
Beijing Guoan	13,571
Shanghai Shenhua	12,786
Wuhan Optics Valley	10,500
Shenzhen Kingway	10,071
Changchun Yatai	8,607
Xiamen Lanshi	8,071
Liaoning	6,929
Chongqing Lifan	6,536
Qingdao Jonoon	6,071
Dalian Shide	5,043
Shenyang Ginde	2,750
Shanghai United	2,193

== See also ==
- Chinese Super League
- Football in China
- Chinese Football Association
- Chinese Football Association Jia League
- Chinese Football Association Yi League
- Chinese FA Cup
