= Hu Zhuowei =

Chinese association football player

Personal information
- Date of birth: 1 June 1983 (age 43)
- Place of birth: Wuhan, China
- Height: 1.82 m (6 ft 0 in)
- Position: Midfielder

Senior career*
Years	Team	Apps	(Gls)
2003–2008	Wuhan Optics Valley	80	(1)
2009–2013	Hubei Luyin	20	(0)
2009	→ Hubei CTGU Kangtian (loan)		
2010	→ Jiangsu Sainty (loan)	11	(1)
2014	Hangzhou Zhipu		
Total		111	(2)
- * Club domestic league appearances and goals as of 14:01, 6 June 2019 (UTC)

Hu Zhuowei (simplified Chinese: 胡卓伟; traditional Chinese: 胡卓偉; pinyin: Hú Zhuōwěi; born 1 June 1983) is a Chinese former footballer.

== Career statistics ==
=== Club ===
Club	Season	League			Cup		Continental		Other		Total	
Club	Season	Division	Apps	Goals	Apps	Goals	Apps	Goals	Apps	Goals	Apps	Goals
Wuhan Optics Valley	2003	Chinese Jia-B League	80	1	0	0	–		0	0	80	1
Wuhan Optics Valley	2004	China League One	80	1	0	0	–		0	0	80	1
Wuhan Optics Valley	2005	Chinese Super League	80	1	0	0	–		0	0	80	1
Wuhan Optics Valley	2006	Chinese Super League	80	1	0	0	–		0	0	80	1
Wuhan Optics Valley	2007	Chinese Super League	80	1	0	0	–		0	0	80	1
Wuhan Optics Valley	2008	Chinese Super League	80	1	0	0	–		0	0	80	1
Wuhan Optics Valley	Total		80	1	0	0	0	0	0	0	80	1
Hubei Luyin	2009	China League Two	20	0	0	0	–		0	0	20	0
Hubei Luyin	2010	China League One	20	0	0	0	–		0	0	20	0
Hubei Luyin	2011	China League One	20	0	0	0	–		0	0	20	0
Hubei Luyin	2012	China League One	20	0	0	0	–		0	0	20	0
Hubei Luyin	2013	Chinese Super League	0	0	0	0	–		0	0	0	0
Hubei Luyin	Total		20	0	0	0	0	0	0	0	20	0
Jiangsu Sainty (loan)	2010	Chinese Super League	11	1	0	0	–		0	0	11	1
Career total			111	2	0	0	0	0	0	0	111	2
