= Ai Zhibo =

Chinese footballer

Ai Zhibo 艾志波
Personal information
- Full name: Ai Zhibo
- Date of birth: 29 October 1982 (age 44)
- Place of birth: Wuhan, Hubei, China
- Height: 1.85 m (6 ft 1 in)
- Position: Defender

Youth career
- 2000: Wuhan Hongjinlong

Senior career*
Years	Team	Apps	(Gls)
2001–2008	Wuhan Hongjinlong	47	(0)
2009–2010	Changchun Yatai	4	(1)
2010	→ Jiangsu Sainty (loan)	8	(0)
2011–2014	Jiangsu Sainty	39	(0)
2014–2021	Wuhan Zall	111	(10)
Total		209	(11)

Managerial career
- 2023: Wuhan Jiangcheng (assistant)
Medal record
Men's football
Representing China
East Asian Games
Gold medal – first place	2001 Macau	Football
- * Club domestic league appearances and goals as of 31 December 2020

Ai Zhibo (Chinese: 艾志波; pinyin: Ài Zhìbō) (born 29 October 1982) is a Chinese retired football player who played as a defender.

== Club career ==
Ai Zhibo played for Wuhan Hongjinlong for several seasons after graduating from their youth system in the 2001 league season. During his time at Wuhan he was often used as a squad player within the team, however despite this he was able to play his part in the team's promotion in winning the second-tier league title in 2004. The following season would see him play his part in helping the team establish themselves within the Chinese Super League by aiding them to a fifth-place finish. After several seasons within the top tier Wuhan had a difficult 2008 season which saw them relegated and then controversially dissolved as a football club.

Without a football club, Ai Zhibo would be allowed to leave for Changchun Yatai at the beginning of the 2009 Chinese Super League season. He would go on to make his club debut on March 28, 2009, against Jiangsu Sainty F.C. in a 1–0 victory coming on as a late substitute. Once again Ai Zhibo was used as a squad player within the team and only made four appearances within his debut season. Things at Changchun did not improve the following season especially with the introduction of Shen Xiangfu coming in as manager who dropped him from the first team. Ai Zhibo would have to wait during the 2010 summer transfer before another top-tier side Jiangsu Sainty took him on loan and reunited him with his former manager at Wuhan, Pei Encai.

On 15 July 2014, Ai transferred to China League One side Wuhan Zall, a team formed as a Phoenix club to Wuhan Hongjinlong. While Ai joined the club halfway through the season he quickly established himself as a vital member of the team and saw the club miss out on promotion to the Chinese Super League on goal difference. After several seasons with the club Ai was finally able to win promotion with the club when Wuhan Zall won to the 2018 China League One division.

== Career statistics ==
Statistics accurate as of match played 31 December 2020.

Appearances and goals by club, season and competition
Club	Season	League			National Cup		League Cup		Continental		Other		Total	
Club	Season	Division	Apps	Goals	Apps	Goals	Apps	Goals	Apps	Goals	Apps	Goals	Apps	Goals
Wuhan Hongjinlong	2001	Jia B League	0	0		0	-		-		-		0	0
Wuhan Hongjinlong	2002	Jia B League	0	0		0	-		-		-		0	0
Wuhan Hongjinlong	2003	Jia B League	3	0	0	0	-		-		-		3	0
Wuhan Hongjinlong	2004	China League One	4	0	1	0	-		-		-		5	0
Wuhan Hongjinlong	2005	Chinese Super League	10	0	0	0	1	0	-		-		11	0
Wuhan Hongjinlong	2006	Chinese Super League	4	0	0	0	-		-		-		4	0
Wuhan Hongjinlong	2007	Chinese Super League	13	0	-		-		-		-		13	0
Wuhan Hongjinlong	2008	Chinese Super League	13	0	-		-		-		-		13	0
Wuhan Hongjinlong	Total		47	0	1	0	1	0	0	0	0	0	49	0
Changchun Yatai	2009	Chinese Super League	4	1	-		-		-		-		4	1
Changchun Yatai	2010	Chinese Super League	0	0	-		-		1	0	-		1	0
Changchun Yatai	Total		4	1	0	0	0	0	1	0	0	0	5	1
Jiangsu Sainty (loan)	2010	Chinese Super League	8	0	-		-		-		-		8	0
Jiangsu Sainty	2011	Chinese Super League	7	0	0	0	-		-		-		7	0
Jiangsu Sainty	2012	Chinese Super League	18	0	0	0	-		-		-		18	0
Jiangsu Sainty	2013	Chinese Super League	12	0	2	0	-		2	0	1 (Note: Appearance(s) in Chinese FA Super Cup)	0	17	0
Jiangsu Sainty	2014	Chinese Super League	2	0	0	0	-		-		-		2	0
Jiangsu Sainty	Total		39	0	2	0	0	0	2	0	1	0	44	0
Wuhan Zall	2014	China League One	15	4	0	0	-		-		-		15	4
Wuhan Zall	2015	China League One	20	0	0	0	-		-		-		20	0
Wuhan Zall	2016	China League One	18	2	0	0	-		-		-		18	2
Wuhan Zall	2017	China League One	21	1	0	0	-		-		-		21	1
Wuhan Zall	2018	China League One	24	3	1	1	-		-		-		25	4
Wuhan Zall	2019	Chinese Super League	11	0	1	0	-		-		-		12	0
Wuhan Zall	2020	Chinese Super League	2	0	3	0	-		-		1 (Note: Appearance(s) in CSL Relegation play-offs)	0	6	0
Wuhan Zall	Total		111	10	5	1	0	0	0	0	1	0	117	11
Career total			209	11	8	1	1	0	3	0	2	0	223	12

== Honours ==
=== Club ===
Wuhan Hongjinlong

- China League One: 2004

Jiangsu Sainty

- Chinese FA Super Cup: 2013

Wuhan Zall

- China League One: 2018

Sporting positions
Preceded by Wu Yan	Wuhan Zall F.C. captain 2015	Succeeded by Yao Hanlin
