= 2005 Chinese Super League =

Chinese Super League
- Season: 2005
- Champions: Dalian Shide (8th title)
- Relegated: N/A
- AFC Champions League: Dalian Shide; Shanghai Shenhua
- A3 Champions Cup: Dalian Shide
- Matches: 182
- Goals: 465 (2.55 per match)
- Top goalscorer: Branko Jelić (21 goals)
- Average attendance: 10,284

The 2005 Chinese Super League season was the second season of China's top-tier football competition. With no relegation the previous season, the league expanded from 12 to 14 clubs with the promotion of Shanghai United and Wuhan Huanghelou. The season was scheduled to start on 5 March 2005, but was postponed until April due to a sponsorship problem and finished on 5 November with Dalian Shide, seven-time champions in the old first division, clinching their eighth title. Defending champions Shenzhen Jianlibao finished third from bottom, the second consecutive year in which the defending champions has done so.

The FA had announced at the start of the season that no teams would be relegated for this season and they kept to this decision.

== Promotion and relegation ==
Teams promoted from 2004 China League One

- Wuhan Huanghelou
- Shanghai United

Teams relegated after end of 2004 Chinese Super League

- None

== Season review ==
The two-year-old league provided a more positive side of football than the previous season, with much fewer drug-abusing, match-fixing and other scandals on and off the pitch. However, the season was criticised for being unexciting with some stating that the only reason that particular clubs did well was because of foreign talents.

Most teams had not invested enough into their squads for the season to compete for the top positions in the CSL. As the decision to cancel relegation had been announced before the start of the season, unlike the previous season where it was decided halfway through. Teams with no chance of winning the league were thus reluctant to spend money in the transfer market.

Nevertheless, there was still strong competition at the top of the table with six teams fighting for the top two AFC Champions League spots. Dalian Shide remained at the top for almost the whole length of the season but there was a constant rotation of second place.

At the lower half of the table, Chongqing Lifan finished at the bottom of the table for two years running while Shenyang Ginde deteriorated to second from bottom.

=== Early surprises ===
Among the contenders for the second spot, Wuhan Huanghelou was no doubt the surprise package. The team, promoted to the CSL the previous season, was little known to their opponents; but they started superbly, embarking on a seven match winning streak at one point, which put them hot on the heels of Dalian Shide. However, like many inexperienced sides, their composure failed in the second half of the season but they still finished a remarkable fifth.

=== Late dash ===
In the second half of the season, the battle for second was mainly between Shanghai Shenhua and Tianjin TEDA. The gap between the two clubs was tiny and neither could afford slip-ups, although Shandong Luneng and Beijing Hyundai, who were also within striking distance, were eyeing their opponents' performances closely.

Shanghai Shenhua had a late surge of form to secure second with Shandong Luneng finished third to miss the final ACL spot by just one point while Tianjin TEDA was happy enough with a fourth place.

Dalian Shide won their eighth top-tier title with a 12 points cushion although they and Shanghai Shenhua had lost the same number of games because they had managed to win 6 games more.

== Personnel ==
Team	Manager
Beijing Hyundai	(China) Shen Xiangfu
Chongqing Lifan	(China) Ma Lin
Dalian Shide	(Serbia and Montenegro) Vladimir Petrović
Inter Shanghai	(China) Cheng Yaodong
Liaoning Zhongyu	(China) Tang Yaodong
Qingdao Zhongneng	(China) Yin Tiesheng
Shandong Luneng	(Serbia and Montenegro) Ljubiša Tumbaković
Shanghai Shenhua	(Russia) Valery Nepomnyashchy
Shanghai United	
Shenyang Ginde	(England) Bob Houghton
Shenzhen Jianlibao	(China) Guo Ruilong
Sichuan Guangdong	(China) Gao Huichen
Tianjin TEDA	(China) Liu Chunming
Wuhan Huanghelou	(China) Chen Fangping

== Foreign players ==
The number of foreign players is restricted to three, but all teams can only use two foreign players on the field in each game. Players from Hong Kong, Macau and Chinese Taipei are deemed to be native players in CSL.

- Players name in **bold** indicates the player is registered during the mid-season transfer window.
- Players in italics were out of the squad or left the club within the season, after the pre-season transfer window, or in the mid-season transfer window, and at least had one appearance.

Club	Player 1	Player 2	Player 3	Former players
Beijing Hyundai	(Hungary) Krisztián Kenesei	(Romania) Dan Alexa	(Serbia and Montenegro) Branko Jelić	
Chongqing Lifan				(Croatia) Ivan Bulat
Dalian Shide	(Brazil) Adilson	(Bulgaria) Zoran Janković	(Serbia and Montenegro) Miodrag Pantelić	
Inter Shanghai	(Brazil) Zé Alcino	(Croatia) **Ivan Bulat**	(Ghana) Kwame Ayew	(Nigeria) Kola Adams
Liaoning Zhongyu	(Cameroon) Clément Lebe			
Qingdao Zhongneng	(Argentina) Oscar Bazán			
Shandong Luneng	(Bulgaria) Predrag Pažin	(Romania) Ionel Dănciulescu	(Serbia and Montenegro) Branimir Petrović	
Shanghai Shenhua	(Honduras) Saúl Martínez	(Serbia and Montenegro) Goran Trobok		
Shanghai United	(Cameroon) Albert Baning	(Cameroon) Christian Pouga	(Cameroon) Didier Njewel	
Shenyang Ginde	(Bosnia and Herzegovina) Sead Bučan	(Peru) **Aldo Olcese**	(Slovakia) **Tomáš Medveď**	
Shenzhen Jianlibao	(Brazil) Nelson Simões	(Poland) Marek Zając	(Togo) Djima Oyawolé	
Sichuan Guangdong				
Tianjin TEDA	(Serbia and Montenegro) Marko Zorić	(South Africa) **Bennett Mnguni**		
Wuhan Huanghelou	(Brazil) Gilsinho	(Brazil) Vicente	(Brazil) Will	(Brazil) Anderson Bill (Brazil) Rafael

Hong Kong/Chinese Taipei/Macau players (doesn't count on the foreign player slot)

Club	Player 1
Shanghai United	(Hong Kong) Ng Wai Chiu

== League table ==
Pos	Team	Pld	W	D	L	GF	GA	GD	Pts	Qualification or relegation
1	Dalian Shide (C)	26	21	2	3	57	18	+39	65	Qualification to AFC Champions League group stage
2	Shanghai Shenhua	26	15	8	3	41	23	+18	53	Qualification to AFC Champions League group stage
3	Shandong Luneng	26	15	7	4	47	30	+17	52	
4	Tianjin TEDA	26	14	7	5	48	26	+22	49	
5	Wuhan Huanghelou	26	11	9	6	34	26	+8	42	
6	Beijing Hyundai	26	12	4	10	46	32	+14	40	
7	Qingdao Zhongneng	26	8	8	10	25	31	−6	32	
8	Inter Shanghai	26	8	7	11	30	32	−2	31	
9	Sichuan Guancheng	26	8	5	13	28	45	−17	29	
10	Liaoning Zhongyu	26	7	8	11	34	42	−8	29	
11	Shanghai United	26	5	7	14	18	35	−17	22	
12	Shenzhen Jianlibao	26	4	10	12	22	42	−20	22	
13	Shenyang Ginde	26	4	7	15	19	43	−24	19	
14	Chongqing Lifan	26	2	7	17	16	41	−25	13	

(C) Champions

== Top scorers ==
Rank	Player	Club	Goals
1	(Serbia and Montenegro) Branko Jelić	Beijing Hyundai	21
2	(China) Zou Jie	Dalian Shide	15
3	(Brazil) Gilsinho	Wuhan Huanghelou	14
3	(China) Xie Hui	Shanghai Shenhua	14
5	(Bulgaria) Zoran Janković	Dalian Shide	13
6	(China) Yu Genwei	Tianjin TEDA	12
7	(China) Xu Liang	Liaoning Zhongyu	10
7	(China) Zheng Zhi	Shandong Luneng	10
7	(Romania) Ionel Dănciulescu	Shandong Luneng	10

== Attendances ==
=== League ===
- Total attendance: 1,871,700
- Average attendance: 10,284

=== Clubs ===
Football club	Average attendance
Shandong Luneng	26,000
Beijing Hyundai	18,923
Tianjin TEDA	16,462
Wuhan Huanghelou	15,654
Dalian Shide	14,000
Shanghai Shenhua	12,462
Liaoning Zhongyu	11,000
Chongqing Lifan	5,731
Sichuan Guancheng	5,477
Shanghai United	4,885
Qingdao Zhongneng	4,500
Inter Shanghai	4,385
Shenzhen Jianlibao	2,423
Shenyang Ginde	2,077

== See also ==
- Chinese Super League
- Football in China
- Chinese Football Association
- Chinese Football Association Jia League
- Chinese Football Association Yi League
- Chinese FA Cup
