= Mei Fang =

Chinese footballer

Mei Fang 梅方
Personal information
- Full name: Mei Fang
- Date of birth: 14 November 1989 (age 36)
- Place of birth: Wuhan, Hubei, China
- Height: 1.87 m (6 ft 1 1/2 in)
- Position: Defender

Team information
- Current team: Qingdao West Coast (assistant coach)

Youth career
- 2005–2008: Wuhan Optics Valley

Senior career*
Years	Team	Apps	(Gls)
2008	Wuhan Optics Valley	0	(0)
2009–2013	Wuhan Zall	107	(7)
2014–2021	Guangzhou FC	106	(1)
Total		213	(8)

International career
2014–2019	China	24	(1)

Managerial career
- 2022–2023: Guangzhou FC (assistant)
- 2023–2024: Guangxi Hengchen (assistant)
- 2026–: Qingdao West Coast (assistant)
Medal record
Representing China
Men's football
EAFF Championship
Bronze medal – third place	2019 South Korea	Team
- * Club domestic league appearances and goals

Mei Fang (Chinese: 梅方; pinyin: Méi Fāng; Mandarin pronunciation: [měɪ fáŋ]; born 14 November 1989) is a former Chinese professional footballer who played as a centre-back.

== Club career ==
Mei Fang started his football career with Wuhan Optics Valley in 2008 when he was promoted to the first team. In August 2008, he had a brief trial with Ligue 2 side RC Strasbourg along with his teammate Wang Yang. In October 2008, Wuhan withdrew from the league for what it claimed was unfair punishment by the Chinese Football Association. Without a club, Mei was invited to a trial with Bundesliga side VfL Wolfsburg with Wang in November 2008. They continued their trials in Europe and moved to Belgian Pro League side Cercle Brugge in December 2008. Cercle Brugge's board later decided to offer contracts to Mei and Wang; however, Mei returned to Wuhan and joined Hubei Luyin which was newly founded by Wuhan's youth academy and Hubei's youth academy in early 2009.

Mei made his professional debut for Hubei during the 2009 season and quickly integrated himself as a starter as the club won promotion to China League One in the 2009 season. On 28 November 2009, he scored his first league goal but missed a penalty in the penalty shootout as Hubei lost to Hunan Billows in the League Two playoff final. He refused Cercle Brugge's invitation to sign with the club again in January 2010. Mei extended his contract for two years in early 2012 after Hubei Greenery changed its name to Wuhan Zall. He was named as the club's captain on 12 March 2012 and made an impression within the team as Wuhan gained promotion to the top tier in the 2012 season. On 8 March 2013, he made his first tier debut against Jiangsu Sainty. He then scored his first goal that season on 1 June 2013 in a 1-1 draw against Qingdao Jonoon. His captaincy was stripped by the club on 18 August 2013 after a 5-1 loss against Guangzhou R&F and was handed to Cho Won-hee.

After Wuhan relegated back to the second tier, Mei was linked with fellow Chinese Super League side Beijing Guoan; however, on 1 January 2014, Mei signed for Guangzhou Evergrande. He made his debut for the club on 26 February 2014 in a 4-2 win against Melbourne Victory in the first group match of the 2014 AFC Champions League, coming on as a substitute for Alessandro Diamanti in the 88th minute. He scored his first goal for the club on 21 May 2014 in a 1-1 draw against Guizhou Renhe. On 29 July 2017, Mei suffered a cruciate ligament injury in a league match against Guangzhou R&F, which ruled him out for the rest of the 2017 season. On 18 July 2018, he made his return in a 4-0 home win against Guizhou Hengfeng.

Mei announced his retirement on 10 March 2022.

== International career ==
Mei made his debut for the Chinese national team on 18 June 2014 in a 2-0 win against Macedonia. Mei was selected in China's 23-man squad for 2015 AFC Asian Cup and played all 4 games in the tournament. On 12 November 2015, Mei scored his first international goal in a 12-0 victory over Bhutan in the 2018 FIFA World Cup qualification.

== Career statistics ==
=== Club statistics ===
Appearances and goals by club, season and competition
Club	Season	League			National Cup		Continental		Other		Total	
Club	Season	Division	Apps	Goals	Apps	Goals	Apps	Goals	Apps	Goals	Apps	Goals
Wuhan Optics Valley	2008	Chinese Super League	0	0	-		-		-		0	0
Wuhan Zall	2009	China League Two	13	1	-		-		-		13	1
Wuhan Zall	2010	China League One	20	0	-		-		-		20	0
Wuhan Zall	2011	China League One	20	2	0	0	-		-		20	2
Wuhan Zall	2012	China League One	26	2	1	0	-		-		27	2
Wuhan Zall	2013	Chinese Super League	28	2	1	0	-		-		29	2
Wuhan Zall	Total		107	7	2	0	0	0	0	0	109	7
Guangzhou Evergrande	2014	Chinese Super League	18	1	2	0	5	0	0 (Note: Appearances in Chinese FA Super Cup)	0	25	1
Guangzhou Evergrande	2015	Chinese Super League	21	0	0	0	9	0	1	0	31	0
Guangzhou Evergrande	2016	Chinese Super League	25	0	7	0	2	0	0	0	34	0
Guangzhou Evergrande	2017	Chinese Super League	13	0	2	0	4	0	0	0	19	0
Guangzhou Evergrande	2018	Chinese Super League	10	0	0	0	0	0	0	0	10	0
Guangzhou Evergrande	2019	Chinese Super League	6	0	0	0	2	0	-		8	0
Guangzhou Evergrande	2020	Chinese Super League	10	0	1	0	4	0	-		15	0
Guangzhou Evergrande	2021	Chinese Super League	3	0	0	0	0	0	-		3	0
Guangzhou Evergrande	Total		106	1	12	0	26	0	1	0	135	1
Career total			213	8	14	0	26	0	1	0	254	8

=== International statistics ===
National team
Year	Apps	Goals
2014	7	0
2015	12	1
2016	1	0
2017	2	0
2018	0	0
2019	2	0
Total	24	1

=== International goals ===
Scores and results list China's goal tally first.

No	Date	Venue	Opponent	Score	Result	Competition
1.	12 November 2015	Helong Stadium, Changsha, China	Bhutan	1–0	12–0	2018 FIFA World Cup qualifier

== Honours ==
=== Club ===
Guangzhou Evergrande

- Chinese Super League: 2014, 2015, 2016, 2017, 2019
- AFC Champions League: 2015
- Chinese FA Cup: 2016
- Chinese FA Super Cup: 2016, 2017, 2018

Sporting positions
Preceded by Yao Hanlin	Wuhan Zall F.C. captain 2012–2013	Succeeded by Cho Won-Hee
