= Wang Yang (footballer, born 1989) =

Chinese footballer

Wang Yang 汪洋
Personal information
- Full name: Wang Yang
- Date of birth: 26 July 1989 (age 37)
- Place of birth: Wuhan, Hubei, China
- Height: 1.91 m (6 ft 3 in)
- Position: Right winger

Youth career
- 2001–2007: Wuhan Optics Valley

Senior career*
Years	Team	Apps	(Gls)
2007–2008	Wuhan Optics Valley	0	(0)
2009–2012	Cercle Brugge	20	(0)
2013	Wuhan Zall	2	(0)
2014–2017	Hebei China Fortune	27	(0)
- * Club domestic league appearances and goals as of 4 November 2017

Wang Yang (Chinese: 汪洋; pinyin: Wāng Yáng; born 26 July 1989 in Wuhan) is a Chinese former footballer. In 2019, Wang Yang was appointed as the vice president of Belgian-Chinese Chamber of Commerce.

== Club career ==
Wang Yang started his career with Wuhan Optics Valley's youth academy. After the team disbanded at the end of the 2008 season, Wang had a trial with Belgian Pro League side Cercle Brugge in December 2008 along with his fellow countryman Mei Fang. The Cercle Brugge board later decided to offer a contract to Wang. He signed with them until June 2010 and extended his contract until the end of the 2011–12 season. Wang concluded the 2008–09 season with Cercle Brugge's reserves team. Wang was promoted to the club's first team for the 2009–10 season. In the first match of the 2009–10 season, Wang made his debut for Cercle Brugge as an 84th-minute substitute for Vuza Nyoni in a 3–1 loss against AA Gent. He was released by Cercle Brugge after the 2011–12 season.

Wang then signed for Chinese Super League side Wuhan Zall on 3 July 2013. He made his debut for the club on 20 October 2013 in a 1–0 loss against Shanghai East Asia. He was released at the end of the 2013 season after failing to make his mark as the club was relegated to the second tier.

On 24 July 2014, Wang transferred to China League One side Hebei Zhongji. He made his debut for the club on 26 July 2014 in a 3–1 win against Guangdong Sunray Cave.
