= Zheng Xiong =

Chinese football manager

Zheng Xiong 郑雄
Personal information
- Full name: Zheng Xiong
- Date of birth: February 5, 1966 (age 60)
- Place of birth: Wuhan, Hubei, China
- Height: 1.78 m (5 ft 10 in)
- Position: Goalkeeper

Managerial career
- Years: Team
- 1999: Shanghai Pudong (assistant)
- 2000–2002: Wuhan Donghu Hi-Tech (assistant)
- 2003: Wuhan Guoce Bluestar reserve
- 2004: Wuhan U17
- 2005: Wuhan U19
- 2005–2006: China U17
- 2008: China U20 (assistant)
- 2009–2012: Hangzhou Greentown (assistant)
- 2012–2013: Wuhan Zall
- 2014: China U20 (caretaker)
- 2015–2016: Wuhan Zall
- 2019–2020: Zhejiang Greentown

Zheng Xiong (Chinese: 郑雄; born February 5, 1966, in Wuhan) is a Chinese football manager. In his youth he experienced organised football training in his hometown of Wuhan, however this would be as far as his playing career would take him before he went off the study to be a police officer. He would return to football in 1995 when he gained the position of deputy general manager for the Ministry of Public Security of the People's Republic of China financially backed club Qianwei Huandao. After leaving the club in 1998 he moved into assistant management and then youth coaching before he received his first senior management position with Hubei CTGU Kangtian and then Wuhan Zall.

== Playing career ==
Zheng Xiong received organised football training in his hometown of Wuhan with their youth team where he was trained as a goalkeeper. By the time he was 17 he was unable to make the transition into professional football after 4 years at Wuhan because his coach believed that he was too short to make it as a goalkeeper at 1.78 m (5 ft 10 in). Deciding to retire he went off to Wuhan Police Vocational College instead to be a police officer, which he became in the late 1980s.

== Management career ==
Zheng returned to football in 1995 when he gained the position of deputy general manager for the Ministry of Public Security of the People's Republic of China financially backed club Qianwei Huandao. In 1998, the club moved to Chongqing and Zheng left them to pursue his dream of becoming a coach when he joined Shanghai Pudong as an assistant coach in 1999. After spending a short time with Shanghai Pudong, he returned to his hometown of Wuhan where he started as an assistant before moving into youth coaching. After gaining a reputation as a rising coach, he joined the China national youth team setup before he went into his first senior coaching position with third-tier club Hubei CTGU Kangtian, whom he guided to a playoff promotion spot at the end of the 2009 China League Two season. Unable to gain promotion with the club, he would soon return into assistant coaching with Hangzhou Greentown until on 14 June 2012 second-tier football club Wuhan Zall needed a caretaker manager for the rest of the 2012 China League One season. His appointment would quickly see the club win promotion at the end of the season and he was offered a permanent contract to guide the club in the 2013 Chinese Super League season; however, his time in the top tier was not a success and after the club went on a six-game winless streak, Zheng resigned. In April 2014, he was appointed as the caretaker coach of China national under-20 football team for the 2014 AFC U-19 Championship after Li Bing resigned. In October 2014, China was defeated by Qatar in the quarterfinals and failed to qualify for the 2015 FIFA U-20 World Cup. The managerial competition of the China U-20 team in December 2014 he entered would go to Li Ming. On 15 July 2015, he returned to Wuhan Zall after Zheng Bin resigned from the club.
