= Wu Yan (footballer) =

Chinese footballer

Wu Yan 吴龑
Personal information
- Date of birth: 7 January 1989 (age 37)
- Place of birth: Jiangdu County, Jiangsu, China
- Height: 1.91 m (6 ft 3 in)
- Position: Goalkeeper

Team information
- Current team: Hubei Istar (goalkeeping coach)

Youth career
- Guangzhou Apollo
- 1999–2005: Gao Fengwen Football School
- 2005–2007: Wuhan Optics Valley

Senior career*
Years	Team	Apps	(Gls)
2007–2008	Wuhan Optics Valley	0	(0)
2009–2014	Wuhan Zall	139	(0)
2015–2021	Henan Jianye	143	(0)
2022	Shaanxi Chang'an Athletic	8	(0)
2022–2023	Dalian Pro	36	(0)
2025	Hubei Istar	0	(0)

International career
2007–2008	China U19		
2009–2011	China U22		

Managerial career
- 2024: Xi'an Chongde Ronghai
- 2025–: Hubei Istar (goalkeeping)
- * Club domestic league appearances and goals

Wu Yan (Chinese: 吴龑; pinyin: Wú Yǎn; born 7 January 1989) is a Chinese football manager and player.

== Club career ==
Wu was promoted to Chinese Super League side Wuhan Optics Valley's first team squad in 2007. He played as the fourth choice goalkeeper of the team. Wuhan Optics Valley withdrew from the top tier for what it claimed was unfair punishment by the Chinese Football Association on 1 October 2008, after a scuffle broke out on the field in one of their matches.

He joined Hubei Greenery which used the Wuhan U-19 team as well as Hubei youth team as the foundation for the squad in 2009. He made 10 appearances for Hubei in the 2010 China League Two without conceding a goal, including two legs of the Semi-finals which Hubei Greenery beat Hangzhou Sanchao 1–0 and promoted to China League One. Wu appeared in every minute of the 2012 league season, playing in all 30 League One games for Wuhan Zall as the club achieved runners-up in the league and promoted to Chinese Super League.

=== Henan Jianye ===
On 13 January 2015, Wu transferred to Chinese Super League side Henan Jianye. He would make his debut in a league game on 8 March 2015 against Tianjin TEDA in a 3-1 victory. He would initially struggle to establish himself throughout the season and lost his position to Han Feng, however the Head coach Jia Xiuquan kept faith with him and the following season he would establish himself as the clubs first choice goalkeeper. In the 2018 season, Wu only conceded 1 of the 6 penalties awarded against Henan, saving 3 of them with the takers missing the other two by hitting the post. After several seasons with Henan he would be replaced by Wang Guoming as the team's first choice goalkeeper and Wu was allowed to leave to join second tier club Shaanxi Chang'an Athletic on 28 April 2022.

=== Dalian Pro ===
After only spending half a season at Shaanxi, Wu returned to the top tier and joined Dalian Pro on 21 August 2022. He immediately replaced long-time serving player Zhang Chong as Dalian's first choice goalkeeper, but could not prevent the team's relegation at the end of the 2023 season.

== Managerial career ==
On 20 February 2024, Wu was appointed as the manager of newly-promoted China League Two club Xi'an Chongde Ronghai, essentially signifying his retirement from playing career.

== Career statistics ==
Appearances and goals by club, season and competition
Club	Season	League			National Cup		Continental		Other		Total	
Club	Season	Division	Apps	Goals	Apps	Goals	Apps	Goals	Apps	Goals	Apps	Goals
Wuhan Optics Valley	2007	Chinese Super League	0	0	-		-		-		0	0
Wuhan Optics Valley	2008	Chinese Super League	0	0	-		-		-		0	0
Wuhan Optics Valley	Total		0	0	0	0	0	0	0	0	0	0
Wuhan Zall	2009	China League Two	10	0	-		-		-		10	0
Wuhan Zall	2010	China League One	23	0	-		-		-		23	0
Wuhan Zall	2011	China League One	18	0	0	0	-		-		18	0
Wuhan Zall	2012	China League One	30	0	0	0	-		-		30	0
Wuhan Zall	2013	Chinese Super League	29	0	0	0	-		-		29	0
Wuhan Zall	2014	China League One	29	0	0	0	-		-		29	0
Wuhan Zall	Total		139	0	0	0	0	0	0	0	139	0
Henan Jianye	2015	Chinese Super League	13	0	1	0	-		-		14	0
Henan Jianye	2016	Chinese Super League	20	0	3	0	-		-		23	0
Henan Jianye	2017	Chinese Super League	30	0	0	0	-		-		30	0
Henan Jianye	2018	Chinese Super League	29	0	0	0	-		-		29	0
Henan Jianye	2019	Chinese Super League	29	0	0	0	-		-		29	0
Henan Jianye	2020	Chinese Super League	17	0	0	0	-		-		17	0
Henan Jianye	2021	Chinese Super League	5	0	0	0	-		-		5	0
Henan Jianye	Total		143	0	4	0	0	0	0	0	147	0
Shaanxi Chang'an Athletic	2022	China League One	8	0	0	0	-		-		8	0
Dalian Professional	2022	Chinese Super League	13	0	0	0	-		-		13	0
Dalian Professional	2023	Chinese Super League	23	0	0	0	-		-		23	0
Dalian Professional	Total		36	0	0	0	0	0	0	0	36	0
Career total			326	0	4	0	0	0	0	0	330	0

Sporting positions
Preceded by Cho Won-hee	Wuhan Zall F.C. captain 2014	Succeeded by Ai Zhibo
