= 2019 Henan Jianye F.C. season =

Henan Jianye
2019 season
- Stadium: Zhengzhou Hanghai Stadium
- Super League: 8th
- FA Cup: Fourth round
Home colours	Away colours

Henan Jianye F.C.’s 2019 season marked their sixth consecutive participation in the Chinese Super League since its inception in 2004, and their sixth consecutive season in the top tier of Chinese football. This season, Henan Jianye will compete in both the Chinese Super League and the Chinese FA Cup.

== Squad statistics ==
=== Appearances and goals ===
As of match played unknown

No.	Pos	Nat	Player	Total		Super League		FA Cup	
No.	Pos	Nat	Player	Apps	Goals	Apps	Goals	Apps	Goals
				0	0	0	0	0	0
Players transferred out during the season

=== Disciplinary record ===
As of match played unknown

No.	Pos	Nat	Player	Super League			FA Cup			Total		
No.	Pos	Nat	Player	Yellow card	Second yellow card	Red card	Yellow card	Second yellow card	Red card	Yellow card	Second yellow card	Red card
				0	0	0	0	0	0	0	0	0
Total				0	0	0	0	0	0	0	0	0

== Friendlies ==
=== Pre-season ===
21 January 2019 Friendly	(Sweden) Östersunds FK	1–0	(China) Henan Jianye	Dromolaxia
14:00 UTC+0		Report		Stadium: Dromolaxia Community Football Pitch

25 January 2019 Friendly	(Bulgaria) Lenski Sofia	0–1	(China) Henan Jianye	Larnaca
14:00 UTC+0		Report		Stadium: Athlítiko Kentro Zenon neo gsz

27 January 2019 Friendly	(Poland) Wisła Płock	1–1	(China) Henan Jianye	Larnaca
14:00 UTC+0		Report		Stadium: Athlítiko Kentro Zenon neo gsz

1 February 2019 Friendly	(Russia) Ufa	2–1	(China) Henan Jianye	Larnaca
15:00 UTC+0		Report		Stadium: Athlítiko Kentro Zenon neo gsz

== Competitions ==
=== Chinese Super League ===
==== Table ====
Pos	Team	Pld	W	D	L	GF	GA	GD	Pts
6	Wuhan Zall	30	12	8	10	41	41	0	44
7	Tianjin TEDA	30	12	5	13	43	45	−2	41 (Note: Head-to-head results: Henan Jianye 2–3 Tianjin TEDA, Tianjin TEDA 2–0 Henan Jianye.)
8	Henan Jianye	30	11	8	11	41	46	−5	41
9	Dalian Yifang	30	10	8	12	44	51	−7	38
10	Chongqing Dangdai Lifan	30	9	9	12	36	47	−11	36

Source: CSL
Rules for classification:
- During season: 1) Points; 2) Goal difference; 3) Goals scored.
- After season: 1) Points; 2) Head-to-head points; 3) Head-to-head goal difference; 4) Head-to-head goals scored; 5) Scores of the weight ratio of the reserve league and youth leagues.
  Notes:

==== Results summary ====
Overall								Home						Away					
Pld	W	D	L	GF	GA	GD	Pts	W	D	L	GF	GA	GD	W	D	L	GF	GA	GD
15	4	5	6	18	23	−5	17	2	1	4	9	13	−4	2	4	2	9	10	−1

Last updated: 29 June 2019.
Source: League table

==== Results by round ====
Round	1	2	3	4	5	6	7	8	9	10	11	12	13	14	15	16	17	18	19	20	21	22	23	24	25	26	27	28	29	30
Ground	H	A	H	A	H	H	A	A	H	A	H	A	A	H	A	A	H	A	H	H										
Result	D	D	L	L	L	W	W	W	L	D	L	D	D	W	L															
Position	10	11	14	12	15	16	13	9	8	9	10	10	10	10	11															

First match(es) will be played on 1 March 2019. Source: Competitive matches
A = Away; H = Home; W = Win; D = Draw; L = Loss

==== Matches ====
All times are local (UTC+8).

3 March 2019 1	Henan Jianye	1–1	Dalian Yifang	Zhengzhou
15:30 UTC+8	Henrique Dourado 26'; Wu Yan (yellow card) 90'	Report	Yang Shanping (yellow card) 24' (yellow-red card) 37'; Qin Sheng (yellow card) 41'; Carrasco 90+1'	Stadium: Zhengzhou Hanghai Stadium; Attendance: 21,696; Referee: (China) Ma Ning (referee)

=== Chinese FA Cup ===
1 May 2019 Fourth round	Guangzhou Evergrande Taobao	2–0	Henan Jianye	Guangzhou
19:35 UTC+8	Gao Lin 41'; Feng Boxuan 83'	Report		Stadium: Tianhe Stadium; Attendance: 38,369; Referee: Shi Zhenlu
