= Huang Xiyang =

Chinese footballer

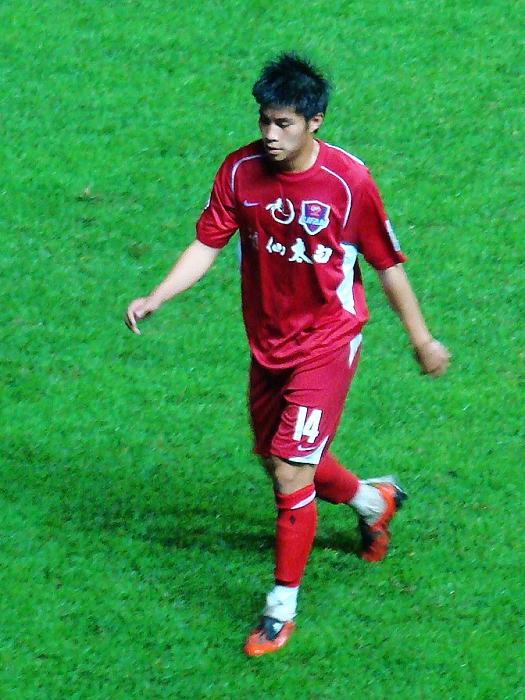

Personal information
- Date of birth: June 14, 1985 (age 41)
- Place of birth: Chongqing, Sichuan, China
- Height: 1.78 m (5 ft 10 in)
- Position: Midfielder

Team information
- Current team: Chongqing Tonglianglong (assistant coach)

Youth career
- Chongqing Lifan

Senior career*
Years	Team	Apps	(Gls)
2005–2010	Chongqing Lifan	120	(19)
2011–2014	Henan Jianye	101	(8)
2015–2016	Hangzhou Greentown	41	(1)
2017–2019	Wuhan Zall	28	(1)
2020–2021	Chongqing Lifan	35	(3)
2022–2025	Chongqing Tonglianglong	66	(10)

International career
2004–2005	China U-20		
2007	China U-23		

Managerial career
- 2026–: Chongqing Tonglianglong (assistant)
- * Club domestic league appearances and goals as of 31 December 2020

Huang Xiyang (Chinese: 黄希扬, born June 14, 1985) is a Chinese former professional footballer who played as a midfielder.

== Club career ==
Huang was the product of the Chongqing Lifan youth team and would start his professional football career with Chongqing Lifan in the 2005 league season, where he quickly established himself as a regular. This was soon followed by his first professional goal on 18 May 2005 when he scored his against Sichuan Guancheng in the first round of the Super League Cup in a 5-1 victory. After six seasons with Chongqing Lifan, Huang was a loyal member of the team as they experienced relegation and promotion back into the Chinese Super League until on December 8, 2010, he decided to transfer to top-tier club Henan Jianye.

At Henan, Huang immediately established himself as a regular within the team, however, he would once again experience relegation at the end of the 2012 league season. After only one season he would help guide Henan to the division title and immediate promotion back into the Chinese Super League. In the following season Henan would be in a fight to avoid relegation, however despite being a vital member of the team, Huang was suspended from the team and returned to his hometown of Chongqing after disagreeing with the Head coach Jia Xiuquan's tactics and his contract renewal. On 25 December 2014, Huang transferred to Chinese Super League side Hangzhou Greentown. He transferred to China League One side Wuhan Zall on 14 January 2017.

He made his return to Chongqing Dangdai on 24 June, 2020.

=== Coaching career ===
On 21 January 2026, Huang was appointed as the assistant coach of Chinese Super League club Chongqing Tonglianglong. After one day, Huang confirmed his retirement as professional footballer.

== Career statistics ==
Statistics accurate as of match played 31 December 2020.

Appearances and goals by club, season and competition
Club	Season	League			National Cup		League Cup		Continental		Total	
Club	Season	Division	Apps	Goals	Apps	Goals	Apps	Goals	Apps	Goals	Apps	Goals
Chongqing Lifan	2005	Chinese Super League	11	0	0	0	1	2	-		12	2
Chongqing Lifan	2006	Chinese Super League	12	1	0	0	-		-		12	1
Chongqing Lifan	2007	China League One	20	5	-		-		-		20	5
Chongqing Lifan	2008	China League One	23	4	-		-		-		23	4
Chongqing Lifan	2009	Chinese Super League	26	3	-		-		-		26	3
Chongqing Lifan	2010	Chinese Super League	28	6	-		-		-		28	6
Chongqing Lifan	Total		120	19	0	0	1	2	0	0	121	21
Henan Jianye	2011	Chinese Super League	30	2	2	0	-		-		32	0
Henan Jianye	2012	Chinese Super League	24	0	0	0	-		-		24	0
Henan Jianye	2013	China League One	29	2	1	1	-		-		30	3
Henan Jianye	2014	Chinese Super League	18	4	2	0	-		-		20	4
Henan Jianye	Total		101	8	5	1	0	0	0	0	106	9
Hangzhou Greentown	2015	Chinese Super League	21	0	0	0	-		-		21	0
Hangzhou Greentown	2016	Chinese Super League	20	1	1	0	-		-		21	1
Hangzhou Greentown	Total		41	1	1	0	0	0	0	0	42	1
Wuhan Zall	2017	China League One	23	1	0	0	-		-		23	1
Wuhan Zall	2018	China League One	5	0	2	1	-		-		7	1
Wuhan Zall	Total		28	1	2	1	0	0	0	0	30	2
Chongqing Lifan	2020	Chinese Super League	16	0	0	0	-		-		16	0
Career total			306	29	8	2	1	2	0	0	315	33

== Honours ==
Henan Jianye

- China League One: 2013

Wuhan Zall

- China League One: 2018
