= Wang Wenhua (footballer) =

Chinese footballer and coach

Wang Wenhua 王文华
Personal information
- Full name: Wang Wenhua
- Date of birth: 17 January 1977 (age 49)
- Place of birth: Wuhan, China
- Height: 1.73 m (5 ft 8 in)
- Position: Midfielder

Youth career
- 1993–1998: Jianlibao Youth

Senior career*
| Years | Team | Apps | (Gls) |
| 1998–2008 | Wuhan Hongjinlong | 160 | (7) |
| 2009–2010 | Wuhan Zall | 4 | (0) |
| 2012–2015 | Xinjiang Tianshan Leopard | 77 | (3) |
- * Club domestic league appearances and goals as of 1 November 2015

Wang Wenhua (Simplified Chinese: 王文华) (born 17 January 1977) is a Chinese professional footballer and coach. As a player, he has spent the majority of his career with Wuhan Hongjinlong before he joined Hubei Greenery where nearing the end of his career he was offered a coaching position with the club before he retired. He has since come out of retirement and is currently playing for Xinjiang Tianshan Leopard.

== Biography ==
As with all the most promising young Chinese players Wang Wenhua would quickly be included in the short-lived Chinese national youth team program to study football abroad in a training programme sponsored by Jianlibao and called the Chinese Jianlibao Youth Football Team. As with his teammate Zheng Bin he would graduate through the Jianlibao Youth Team and return to his hometown to play for Wuhan Hongjinlong to start his professional football career. He would make his debut for Wuhan during the 1998 league season and make nine appearances in his debut season. Despite Wuhan getting relegated at the end of the 1999 league season he would remain loyal to the team and for the next several seasons he would establish himself as an energetic technically gifted winger who could also defend despite his rather thin and short stature. In the 2004 league season he would aid the team to a division title and promotion to the top tier. The following season saw Wuhan establish himself within the league and also win the Chinese Super League Cup in 2005.

When Wuhan decided to quit the 2008 Chinese Super League for unfair punishment after the club's management did not accept the punishment given to them by the Chinese Football Association after a scuffle broke out during a league game against Beijing Guoan on 27 September 2008 Wang Wenhua would once again show his loyalty to the region by sticking with the club. Even when the club was disbanded and most of the entire senior team left Wang stayed to be part of the newly formed Hubei Luyin team who were created from what was left from the Wuhan team as well as Hubei youth team. One of the more senior players within this newly formed team he was also given a coaching position and he helped the team win promotion to the second tier after only one season.

== Honours ==
Wuhan Optics Valley

- Chinese Football Association Jia League: 2004
- Chinese Super League Cup: 2005
