= Yang Kunpeng =

Chinese footballer

Yang Kunpeng 杨鲲鹏
Personal information
- Date of birth: November 21, 1978 (age 47)
- Place of birth: Qingdao, Shandong, China
- Height: 1.88 m (6 ft 2 in)
- Position: Defender

Youth career
- 1997–1999: Qingdao Etsong

Senior career*
Years	Team	Apps	(Gls)
1999–2001	Qingdao Etsong	13	(0)
2002–2003	Bayi Football Team	12	(1)
2004–2007	Wuhan Huanghelou	58	(3)
2008	Qingdao Jonoon	19	(0)
2010	Qingdao Jonoon	0	(0)
- * Club domestic league appearances and goals

Yang Kunpeng (simplified Chinese: 杨鲲鹏; traditional Chinese: 楊鯤鵬; pinyin: Yáng Kūnpéng; born November 21, 1978, in Qingdao) is a Chinese football player.

== Professional career ==
Yang Kunpeng began his professional football career playing for the Qingdao youth team before he eventually graduated to their senior team. While he initially broke into the senior team during the 1999 league season he struggled to gain a regular position within the following season team and failed to become a regular within first team. He would move to Bayi Football Team and under their Head coach Pei Encai he would revitalize his career and become a regular player within the team, however the 2003 league season saw the Bayi disbanded. He would follow his manager and join Wuhan Huanghelou and for the next four years was the starting center defender for the team. When Pei Encai left to take over the Chinese women's team tensions grew between the management and certain Shandong born players like Li Zhuangfei, Ren Yongshun, Guo Mingyue and Deng Xiaofei who believed that the management were mistreating them and purging them during the end of the 2007 league season. All these players would eventually leave the club and Yang was one of them when he decided to transfer back to his hometown in Qingdao in 2008.

== Honours ==
Wuhan

- China League One: 2004
