= Roberto Demus =

Argentine footballer

Personal information
- Full name: Roberto Emanuel Demus Metz
- Date of birth: 4 January 1979 (age 47)
- Place of birth: Argentina
- Position: Forward

Youth career
- San Lorenzo de Almagro

Senior career*
Years	Team	Apps	(Gls)
- San Lorenzo de Almagro
1999–20xx	Club Almagro→(loan)		
20xx–2004	Club Almagro		
2004–2005	Club El Porvenir		
2005–2006	Coronel Bolognesi		
2006	Wuhan Guanggu		
2007	Barcelona S.C.		
2007	Deportivo Italia		
2008	Club Almirante Brown		
2008	Coronel Bolognesi		(7)
2009–2011	Club Deportivo Universidad César Vallejo	81	(31)
2012	Atlético Uruguay		

Managerial career
- 2015: Club Almagro (assistant)
- * Club domestic league appearances and goals

Roberto Demus (born 4 January 1979 in Argentina) is a retired Argentinean footballer. As an athlete, Robert Demus excelled at creating scoring chances inside the penalty area (colloquially "the 18-yard box" or just "the box").

== Club career ==
=== Wuhan Guanggu ===
On July 8, 2006, it was announced that Demus had signed a contract with Wuhan Guanggu, making his debut with the team in their match against Tianjin Teda. Despite performing well in training, Demus did not mesh well with Zheng Bin on the offensive side of the field, scoring no goals in his first five appearances. In total, he made 17 appearances and 5 goals in the Chinese Super League.

=== Coronel Bolognesi ===
Throughout 2005, 2006 and 2008 Demus scored 32 goals in 71 match appearances with Coronel Bolognesi.

=== Club Deportivo Universidad Católica ===
Throughout 2009–2011, Demus scored 31 goals in 81 match appearances with Club Deportivo Universidad César Vallejo in the Peruvian Primera División.
