= Liu Jian (footballer) =

Chinese footballer

Liu Jian 刘健
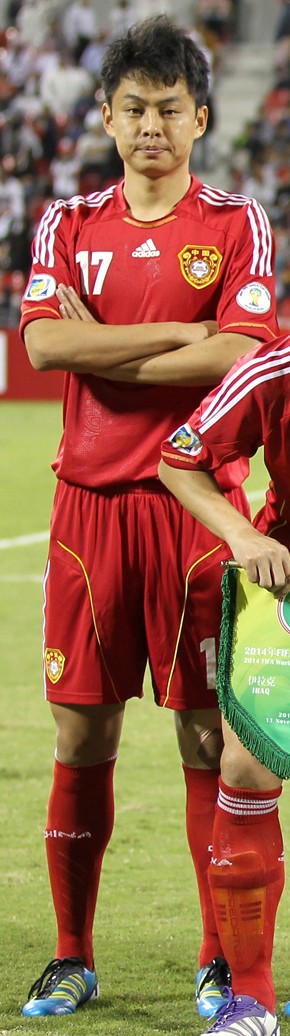

Personal information
- Full name: Liu Jian
- Date of birth: 20 August 1984 (age 42)
- Place of birth: Zibo, Shandong, China
- Height: 1.83 m (6 ft 0 in)
- Positions: Midfielder; centre-back

Team information
- Current team: Qingdao West Coast (assistant coach)

Youth career
- 2001–2004: Qingdao Jonoon

Senior career*
Years	Team	Apps	(Gls)
2004–2013	Qingdao Jonoon	245	(38)
2014–2017	Guangzhou Evergrande	54	(4)
2018–2020	Beijing Renhe	47	(1)
2021	Qingdao FC	20	(1)

International career
2007–2013	China	36	(3)

Managerial career
- 2025–: Qingdao West Coast (assistant)
- 2026: China (trainer)
Medal record
Representing China
Men's football
EAFF Championship
Bronze medal – third place	2008 China	Team
- * Club domestic league appearances and goals as of 31 December 2022

Liu Jian (Chinese: 刘健; pinyin: Liú Jiàn; Mandarin pronunciation: [ljǒʊ tɕjɛ̂n]; born 20 August 1984) is a Chinese football coach and former footballer who played as a midfielder or deep-lying playmaker. He represented Qingdao Jonoon, Guangzhou Evergrande, Beijing Renhe and Qingdao FC. In his career he won four Chinese Super League titles, one Chinese FA Cup and an AFC Champions League, all while he was with Guangzhou. He also played for China national football team between 2007 and 2013 and secured over 30 caps.

== Club career ==
Liu Jian started his football career with Qingdao Jonoon in the 2004 season. He made his debut for the club on 19 September 2004 in a 1–1 draw against Sichuan Guancheng. He scored his first goal for the club on 4 December 2004 in 1–1 draw against Sichuan Guancheng. The following season, he immediately established himself as a regular for the club in the 2005 season, becoming an integral part due to his versatility. Liu would go on to captain his club and attracted the interests of reigning Chinese champions Guangzhou Evergrande, however with Qingdao Jonoon unwilling to allow their captain leave on a free transfer at the end of the 2013 Chinese Super League season, forged a contract extension. The club were found guilty for breaking the Chinese FA's rules and were deducted 7 points.

On 3 January 2014, Liu transferred to fellow Chinese Super League side Guangzhou Evergrande. After months of negotiation problems between Qingdao and Guangzhou, he was finally cleared to make his debut for the club on 19 April 2014 in a 2–1 win against Shanghai Shenhua. He would go on to win his first league title with the club at the end of the 2014 Chinese Super League season. This would be followed by him playing in and then going on to win the 2015 AFC Champions League. Going on to establish himself as a deep-lying playmaker within the team, he would win his fourth league title with the club at the end of the 2017 Chinese Super League season.

After four seasons at Guangzhou, Liu moved to Chinese Super League newcomer Beijing Renhe on 28 December 2017. He would go on to make his debut in a league game on 3 March 2018 against Chongqing Dangdai Lifan in a 1–0 defeat. While he was part of the team that helped the club avoid relegation in his first season with the club, he wasn't able to achieve the same fate in the following season and they were relegated at the end of the 2019 Chinese Super League season. On 2 April 2021, Liu joined top-tier club Qingdao on a free transfer. After one season with the club, Liu would retire from playing on 21 June 2022 and start to move into coaching.

== International career ==
Liu made his debut and scored his first goal for the Chinese national team on 21 October 2007 in a 7–0 win against Myanmar.

== Career statistics ==
=== Club statistics ===
As of 31 December 2022.

Appearances and goals by club, season and competition
Club	Season	League			National Cup		League Cup		Continental		Other		Total	
Club	Season	Division	Apps	Goals	Apps	Goals	Apps	Goals	Apps	Goals	Apps	Goals	Apps	Goals
Qingdao Jonoon	2004	Chinese Super League	10	1	0	0	2	0	-		-		12	1
Qingdao Jonoon	2005	Chinese Super League	24	4	1	0	4	3	-		-		29	7
Qingdao Jonoon	2006	Chinese Super League	25	5	0	0	-		-		-		25	5
Qingdao Jonoon	2007	Chinese Super League	27	8	-		-		-		-		27	8
Qingdao Jonoon	2008	Chinese Super League	21	6	-		-		-		-		21	6
Qingdao Jonoon	2009	Chinese Super League	28	0	-		-		-		-		28	0
Qingdao Jonoon	2010	Chinese Super League	28	7	-		-		-		-		28	7
Qingdao Jonoon	2011	Chinese Super League	28	3	0	0	-		-		-		28	3
Qingdao Jonoon	2012	Chinese Super League	28	4	0	0	-		-		-		28	4
Qingdao Jonoon	2013	Chinese Super League	26	0	2	0	-		-		-		28	0
Qingdao Jonoon	Total		245	38	3	0	6	3	0	0	0	0	254	41
Guangzhou Evergrande	2014	Chinese Super League	14	1	2	0	-		2	0	0	0	18	1
Guangzhou Evergrande	2015	Chinese Super League	16	1	1	0	-		8	0	1 (Note: Appearances in FIFA Club World Cup)	0	26	1
Guangzhou Evergrande	2016	Chinese Super League	7	0	2	1	-		4	0	1 (Note: Appearances in Chinese FA Super Cup)	0	14	1
Guangzhou Evergrande	2017	Chinese Super League	17	2	6	1	-		3	0	0	0	26	3
Guangzhou Evergrande	Total		54	4	11	2	0	0	17	0	2	0	84	6
Beijing Renhe	2018	Chinese Super League	16	0	0	0	-		-		-		16	0
Beijing Renhe	2019	Chinese Super League	20	0	0	0	-		-		-		20	0
Beijing Renhe	2020	China League One	11	1	-		-		-		2 (Note: Appearances in China League One relegation playoffs)	0	13	1
Beijing Renhe	Total		47	1	0	0	0	0	0	0	2	0	49	1
Qingdao FC	2021	Chinese Super League	20	1	1	0	-		-		2 (Note: Appearance(s) in CSL Relegation play-offs)	0	23	1
Career total			366	44	15	2	6	3	17	0	6	0	410	49

=== International goals ===
As of 17 February 2008
Scores and results list China's goal tally first.

No	Date	Venue	Opponent	Score	Result	Competition
1.	21 October 2007	Century Lotus Stadium, Foshan, China	Myanmar	4–0	7–0	2010 FIFA World Cup qualifier
2.	28 October 2007	KLFA Stadium, Kuala Lumpur, Malaysia	Myanmar	2–0	4–0	2010 FIFA World Cup qualifier
3.	17 February 2008	Olympic Sports Center, Chongqing, China	South Korea	2–1	2–3	2008 East Asian Football Championship

== Honours ==
=== Club ===
Guangzhou Evergrande

- Chinese Super League: 2014, 2015, 2016, 2017
- AFC Champions League: 2015
- Chinese FA Cup: 2016
- Chinese FA Super Cup: 2016

=== Individual ===
- Chinese Super League Team of the Year: 2007
