= Li Xingqi =

Chinese association football player

Personal information
- Date of birth: 2 August 2000 (age 26)
- Position: Defender

Team information
- Current team: Wuhan Zall
- Number: 42

Youth career
- –2020: Wuhan Zall

Senior career*
| Years | Team | Apps | (Gls) |
| 2020– | Wuhan Zall | 0 | (0) |
- * Club domestic league appearances and goals as of 14:01, 31 December 2020 (UTC)

Li Xingqi (Chinese: 李兴齐; born 2 August 2000) is a Chinese footballer currently playing as a defender for Wuhan Zall.

== Club career ==
Li Xingqi would be promoted to the senior team of Wuhan Zall in the 2020 Chinese Super League campaign and he would go on to make his debut on 19 September 2020 in a Chinese FA Cup game against Hebei China Fortune F.C. that ended in a 1–1 draw, but was won in a penalty shootout.

== Career statistics ==
As of 31 December 2020.

| Club | Season | League | | | Cup | | Continental | | Other | | Total | |
| Club | Season | Division | Apps | Goals | Apps | Goals | Apps | Goals | Apps | Goals | Apps | Goals |
|---|---|---|---|---|---|---|---|---|---|---|---|---|
| Wuhan Zall | 2020 | Chinese Super League | 0 | 0 | 5 | 0 | – | | 0 (Note: Appearance(s) in CSL Relegation play-offs) | 0 | 5 | 0 |
| Career total | | | 0 | 0 | 5 | 0 | 0 | 0 | 0 | 0 | 5 | 0 |
