= Didier Njewel =

Cameroonian footballer

Personal information
- Full name: Didier Njewel
- Date of birth: September 7, 1983 (age 43)
- Place of birth: Douala, Cameroon
- Height: 1.78 m (5 ft 10 in)
- Position: Striker

Youth career
- 2001–2002: Dalian Shide

Senior career*
Years	Team	Apps	(Gls)
2003–2005	Dalian Shide	0	(0)
2003	→ Dalian Sidelong (loan)	?	(?)
2004–2005	→ Zhuhai Zobon (loan)	52	(10)
2008–2009	Shanghai Zobon	21	(4)
2012	Shanghai East Asia	5	(0)
- * Club domestic league appearances and goals as of 1 July 2009

Didier Njewel (born 7 September 1983) is a Cameroonian football midfielder currently playing club football for Shanghai East Asia.
