= Aderaldo =

Brazilian footballer (born 1977)

Personal information
- Full name: Aderaldo Ferreira André
- Date of birth: 14 June 1977 (age 49)
- Place of birth: Maceió, Alagoas, Brazil
- Height: 1.82 m (5 ft 11 1/2 in)
- Position: Defender

Team information
- Current team: CSA

Senior career*
Years	Team	Apps	(Gls)
1996–1998	CRB	?	(?)
1999	Ituano	?	(?)
1999	Paraguaçuense	?	(?)
1999	Bellinzona	?	(?)
2000–2001	Juventude	?	(?)
2001	Comercial	?	(?)
2001	Londrina	?	(?)
2002	Joinville	?	(?)
2003	Vitória	9	(0)
2004	Botafogo	?	(?)
2004	Žilina	?	(?)
2005	Ituano	?	(?)
2005	Paraná	32	(1)
2006	Shanghai United	24	(1)
2007	Beijing Guoan	8	(0)
2008	São Caetano	5	(1)
2008	A. Portuguesa D.	7	(0)
2009	Santa Helena	?	(?)
2009	Paraná	7	(0)
2010–2011	Shanghai Shenhua	10	(1)
2011	Icasa		
2011	CRB		
2012–	CSA		
- * Club domestic league appearances and goals as of 13:36, 16 March 2011 (UTC)

Aderaldo Ferreira André (born 14 June 1977), known as just Aderaldo, is a Brazilian football defender.

== Career ==
Aderaldo played for EC Vitória in the 2003 Campeonato Brasileiro Série A. He also played for Paraná Clube in Série B.
