= Alysson (footballer, born 1976) =

Brazilian footballer

Personal information
- Full name: Alysson Marendaz Marins
- Date of birth: 26 May 1976 (age 50)
- Place of birth: Rio de Janeiro, Brazil
- Height: 1.85 m (6 ft 1 in)
- Position: Striker

Team information
- Current team: Avai FC

Senior career*
Years	Team	Apps	(Gls)
1996–2000	CR Vasco da Gama		
1999–2001	CFZ do Rio		
2002–2003	Kalmar FF		
2004	Östersund		
2005	Perak FA		
2007–2008	Beijing Guoan		
2009	CFZ Imbituba		
2010	Avaí		
- * Club domestic league appearances and goals as of 14 January 2009

Alysson Marendaz Marins (born 26 May 1976), known as just Alysson, is a Brazilian football player.

== Career ==
As a journeyman, Alysson Marendaz Marins has played for CR Vasco da Gama, on loan for Serrano Football Club, CFZ do Rio in Brazil.

After having trialed with AIK in Sweden, Alysson joined Swedish club Kalmar FF in 2002. Alysson was the first of several Brazilian players to play for the club in the 2000s. He scored in his debut against Elfsborg. He then continued to Östersund in Sweden, Perak FA in Malaysia, and Chinese Super League club Beijing Guoan. He played for CFZ Imbituba. In 2010, Alysson signed a contract with Avaí.
