= Anderson Bill =

Brazilian footballer (born 1981)

Personal information
- Full name: Anderson Martins Pedro
- Date of birth: 4 May 1981 (age 45)
- Place of birth: Criciúma, Brazil
- Height: 1.90 m (6 ft 3 in)
- Position: Centre-back

Senior career*
Years	Team	Apps	(Gls)
2000–?	Criciúma		
2001	Cruzeiro		
2007	Próspera		
2008	Internacional de Santa Maria		
2008	América		
2009	Veranópolis		
2009–2010	Caxias	1	(0)
2010	Grêmio Prudente		
2011	Veranópolis		
- * Club domestic league appearances and goals

Anderson Martins Pedro (born 4 May 1981), known as Anderson Bill, is a Brazilian former professional footballer who played as a centre-back.

== Career statistics ==
(Correct as of 16 October 2010)

Club	Season	State League		Brazilian Série A		Copa do Brasil		Copa Libertadores		Copa Sudamericana		Total	
Club	Season	Apps	Goals	Apps	Goals	Apps	Goals	Apps	Goals	Apps	Goals	Apps	Goals
Grêmio Prudente	2010	-	-	1	0	-	-	-	-	-	-	1	0
Total		-	-	1	0	-	-	-	-	-	-	1	0
