= Saša Zimonjić =

Serbian footballer

Personal information
- Full name: Saša Zimonjić
- Date of birth: 9 April 1978 (age 48)
- Place of birth: Čačak, SFR Yugoslavia
- Height: 1.83 m (6 ft 0 in)
- Position: Midfielder

Senior career*
Years	Team	Apps	(Gls)
1996–1998	Borac Čačak	61	(2)
1998–2003	Obilić	103	(9)
2003	Levski Sofia	3	(0)
2003–2004	Železnik	15	(1)
2004–2005	Panionios	18	(0)
2005–2006	Obilić	2	(0)
2006–2008	Mjällby AIF	37	(3)
2008–2009	Slavija Sarajevo	11	(0)
2009–2010	Beograd	3	(0)
Total		253	(15)

International career
1999	FR Yugoslavia U21	1	(0)
- * Club domestic league appearances and goals

Saša Zimonjić (Serbian Cyrillic: Саша Зимоњић; born 9 April 1978) is a Serbian retired footballer.

== Statistics ==
Club	Season	League	
Club	Season	Apps	Goals
Obilić	1999–00	30	5
Obilić	2000–01	28	4
Obilić	2001–02	28	0
Obilić	2002–03	12	0
Železnik	2003–04	15	1
Obilić	2005–06	2	0
