= Kingway Brewery =

Chinese beer manufacturer

Kingway Brewery Holdings Limited 金威啤酒集團有限公司
- Type: State-owned enterprise (Red chip)
- Industry: Beer
- Founded: 1990
- Headquarters: Shenzhen, Guangdong, China
- Area served: China
- Key people: Chairman: Mr. Li Wenyue; CEO: Mr. Ye Xuquan
- Products: Beer
- Website: Kingway Brewery Holdings Limited

Trademark of Kingway Brewery

Kingway Brewery Holdings Limited (SEHK: 124) is a leading beer maker in China. It is a subsidiary of government-owned Guangdong Holdings Group, the biggest Hong Kong–based enterprise owned by the Guangdong provincial government. The Dutch brewing company Heineken International owns a 21% share in the company. It produces, distributes, and markets beer in more than 20 provinces under such labels as "Kingway", "Kingway Draft", and "Super Fresh Kingway".

In February 2013, Kingway Brewery announced that the company had agreed to be taken over by China Resources Enterprise, Ltd in a deal worth $863.2 million.

== See also ==
- Beer and breweries in China
