= Marko Zorić =

Serbian footballer

Personal information
- Date of birth: 10 July 1980 (age 46)
- Place of birth: Zrenjanin, SFR Yugoslavia
- Height: 1.92 m (6 ft 4 in)
- Position: Centre-back

Senior career*
Years	Team	Apps	(Gls)
1998–2000	Proleter Zrenjanin	36	(2)
2000–2001	Partizan Belgrade	3	(1)
2001–2004	Teleoptik	81	(7)
2004–2005	Proleter Zrenjanin	27	(6)
2005–2006	Tianjin Teda	50	(6)
2006–2007	Banat Zrenjanin	8	(1)
2007–2008	Gençlerbirliği	5	(0)
2008–2009	Banat Zrenjanin	36	(3)
2009	Shenzhen Asia Travel	14	(1)
2010–2011	Tianjin Teda	54	(6)
2012	Banat Zrenjanin		
Total		314	(33)
- * Club domestic league appearances and goals

Marko Zorić (Serbian Cyrillic: Марко Зopић, pronounced [mâːrko zǒːritɕ]; born 10 July 1980) is a Serbian retired footballer who played as a centre-back.

== Club career ==
Born in Zrenjanin, Zorić began his professional football career with top tier side Proleter Zrenjanin where he attracted the interests of Serbian heavyweights Partizan Belgrade who he would join in the 2000–01 league season. During his time at Partizan Belgrade he saw little playing time and he moved to second tier club FK Teleoptik. With FK Teleoptik he was relegated to the third tier. During this period he established himself as an integral member of the team and a return to Proleter Zrenjanin in the 2004–05 league season, who were now in the second tier.

After a season with Proleter Zrenjanin Zorić he moved abroad to China and joined top tier side Tianjin Teda in the 2005 Chinese Super League where he helped guide Tianjin to fourth within the league, which was the best placed finish for the team since the league became fully professional. Two seasons later Zorić returned to Serbia joining top tier side Banat Zrenjanin in the 2006–07 Serbian SuperLiga. He left after a season to join top tier Turkish side Gençlerbirliği in the 2007–08 Süper Lig but once again this was short lived and he returned to Banat Zrenjanin where this time he was able to gain significantly more playing time but also saw the club relegated at the end of the 2008–09 Serbian SuperLiga.

On 15 July 2009, Zorić was looking for a move back to the Chinese Super League and recently promoted side Jiangsu Sainty were interested in his services until he sustained an injury during training, however fellow Super League side Shenzhen Asia Travel were willing to take a chance and signed him in their fight against relegation in the 2009 Chinese Super League season. The following season Zorić would return to Tianjin Teda and once again became an integral member of the team's defence and go on to win 2011 Chinese FA Cup with them.

== Honours ==
Tianjin Teda

- Chinese FA Cup: 2011
