= Gilsinho (footballer, born 1977) =

Brazilian footballer

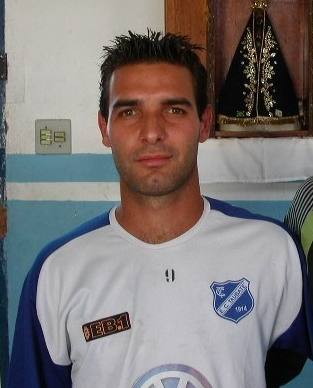

Personal information
- Full name: Gílson Domingos Rezende Agostinho
- Date of birth: September 18, 1977 (age 49)
- Place of birth: Taubaté, São Paulo, Brazil
- Height: 1.80 m (5 ft 11 in)
- Position: Striker

Senior career*
Years	Team	Apps	(Gls)
1999–2002	Taubaté	87	(22)
2002–2003	São Bento	14	(9)
2003–2004	Londrina	8	(0)
2005–2007	Wuhan Guanggu	75	(28)
2008	Henan Jianye	27	(2)
2009	Taubaté		
2010	São Bento	2	(0)
2011–2012	Taubaté	31	(17)
- * Club domestic league appearances and goals

Gílson Domingos Rezende Agostinho (born September 18, 1977) more commonly known simply as Gilsinho, is a Brazilian former professional footballer who played as a striker. In his career, he was predominantly remembered for his association with his hometown football club Taubaté in Brazil as well as time with Chinese Super League club Wuhan Guanggu where he won the 2005 Chinese Super League Cup with them.

== Career ==
Gilsinho was born in Taubaté. His father was an amateur footballer who encouraged him and his brother to take up the sport. When he grew up he would go on to become a professional footballer and started his career playing for his hometown football club Taubaté in the Brazilian Campeonato Paulista Série A3 division. After several seasons Gilsinho would move up a division when he joined São Bento to play in the Campeonato Paulista Série A2 while his younger brother Gisiel Rezende Agostinho joined his old club as their new goalkeeper. After his stint with São Bento Gilsinho would join Campeonato Brasileiro Série B side Londrina, however his time with the club was not very successful as the struggled within the league while Gilsinho saw little playing time.

Gilsinho would decide to go abroad and joined recently promoted Chinese Super League side Wuhan Guanggu where he quickly became a regular and helped guide them to a fifth-place finish as well as winning the 2005 Chinese Super League Cup with them. For the next several seasons he continued to be a vital member of the team until another Chinese club in Henan Jianye looked to sign him to help out in their attack, however after staying with them for a whole season he was only able to score two goals and was allowed to leave. This saw Gilsinho go back to Brazil where he would go back to his old clubs Taubaté, São Bento and Taubaté again where he played alongside his brother for a short time before deciding to retire.

== Honours ==
Wuhan Guanggu

- Chinese Super League Cup: 2005.
