= Vicente (footballer, born 1979) =

Brazilian footballer

Personal information
- Full name: Vicente de Paula Neto
- Date of birth: 10 September 1979 (age 47)
- Place of birth: Salvador, Bahia, Brazil
- Height: 1.92 m (6 ft 4 in)
- Position: Striker

Senior career*
Years	Team	Apps	(Gls)
2002	AA Flamengo	?	(?)
2003	→ Caxias FC (loan)	?	(7)
2004–2005	Wuhan Guanggu	49	(19)
2006	Inter Shanghai	24	(11)
2007	Wuhan Guanggu	19	(4)
2008–2009	Shaanxi Chan-Ba	54	(14)
2010	Shanghai Shenhua	19	(3)
2011–2012	Wuhan Zall	50	(18)
2013–2017	Xinjiang Tianshan Leopard	124	(3)
- * Club domestic league appearances and goals as of 28 October 2017

Vicente de Paula Neto (born 10 September 1979) more commonly known simply as Vicente, is a retired Brazilian football striker who spent most of his career in China.

== Club career ==
=== Early career ===
Vicente would play his early career in Brazil where he would predominantly play for lower league side AA Flamengo in the Campeonato Paulista Série A3 division. He was also then loaned out to another regional lower league side Caxias FC where he played for one season in the Campeonato Catarinense Second Level.

=== Move to China ===
Vicente would move to China to join the second-tier football club Wuhan Guanggu in the 2004 league season where he had a successful period with them when he won the Chinese Football Association Jia League title and helped them win promotion. The following season would see Vicente continue his successful time with Wuhan when he won the Chinese Super League cup in 2005 to add further silverware with the team. His performances with Wuhan would attract the interests of Inter Shanghai who he would join for the 2006 league season, however after only one season he would return to Wuhan. This time at the club he would not become as an integral member within the team and returned to Inter Shanghai who had changed its name to Shaanxi Chan-Ba. In March 2010, Vicente who had previously been linked to Jiangsu Sainty and Shenyang Dongjin moved to Shanghai Shenhua as a free agent.

== Honours ==
Wuhan Guanggu

- Chinese Football Association Jia League: 2004
- Chinese Super League Cup: 2005
