= Xinhua Road Sports Center =

Sports venue in Wuhan, China

- Interactive map of Xinhua Road Sports Center
- Location: Wuhan, Hubei, China
- Coordinates: 30°35′21″N 114°16′05″E
- Capacity: 22,140
- Public transit: 2 at Zhongshan Park

Construction
- Opened: 1954

Tenant
- Hubei Istar (2023–)

Xinhua Road Sports Centre Stadium (Chinese: 新华路体育中心) is a multi-purpose stadium in Wuhan, Hubei Province, China. It is currently used mostly for football matches. The stadium has a capacity for 22,140 people. It opened in 1954. Hubei Istar F.C. use the venue for home matches.

== Competitions ==
- AFC U-19 Women's Championship 2009
- AFC U-16 Women's Championship 2015
