= Predrag Pažin =

Bulgarian footballer

Personal information
- Full name: Predrag Pažin
- Date of birth: 14 March 1973 (age 53)
- Place of birth: Nevesinje, SR Bosnia and Herzegovina, SFR Yugoslavia
- Height: 1.87 m (6 ft 1 1/2 in)
- Position: Centre back

Youth career
- 1979–1991: Velež Nevesinje

Senior career*
Years	Team	Apps	(Gls)
1987–1991	Velež Nevesinje		
1991–1993	Sutjeska Nikšić	36	(2)
1993–1995	Rudar Pljevlja	40	(4)
1995–1999	Partizan	63	(7)
1999–2000	Levski Sofia	29	(1)
2000–2001	Kocaelispor	15	(3)
2001	Spartak Pleven	9	(0)
2002	Beijing Guoan	26	(4)
2003–2005	Shakhtar Donetsk	22	(1)
2005–2007	Shandong Luneng	62	(5)
2008–2010	Lokomotiv Mezdra	46	(4)
Total		369	(35)

International career
2000–2004	Bulgaria	31	(0)

Managerial career
- 2011: Botev Kozloduy
- 2015: Lokomotiv 2012 Mezdra
- * Club domestic league appearances and goals

Predrag Pažin (Bulgarian and Serbian Cyrillic: Предраг Пажин; born 14 March 1973) is a former footballer who played as a defender. Born in Yugoslavia, he represented Bulgaria internationally.

== Club career ==
He signed his first professional contract with Sutjeska from Nikšić, where he played from 1991 to 1993. Then, until 1995, he played for Rudar from Pljevlja. When in January he moved to Partizan. While he was playing for Partizan, he had an incident with Mateja Kežman during the match that Partizan played against Lazio. After one unsuccessful attack, Pažin blamed Kežman, to which he responded with insults, which caused Pažin to hit him. With Partizan, he was three times the champion of Yugoslavia and once the cup winner. When NATO bombed FR Yugoslavia in 1999, the championship was interrupted, Pažin was out of contract and, in May of the same year, he went to Werder Bremen for a ten-day trial.

He did not sign a contract with Werder, but he received an invitation from Ljupko Petrović, the coach of Levski Sofia at the time. With Levski, he won the title and the Bulgarian Cup, and was declared the best foreign player. He spent two seasons in Bulgaria during which he was offered citizenship and a chance to play for the country's national team - both of which he took. However, he was suddenly sold to Turkish side Kocaelispor, to which he moved in 2001. He won the cup in Turkey, but did not stay there long, so the following year he returned to Bulgaria, where he played for Spartak Pleven.

In the same year, he went to China, where he played for Beijing Guoan, coached by Ljupko Petrović. After China, in 2003 he moved to the Ukrainian Shakhtar Donetsk, for which he would play until 2005. He won the Ukrainian Cup with Shakhtar in 2004. He returned to China again in 2005, where he played for Shandong Luneng until 2007. The following year, he won the championship and the Cup of China. In the AFC Champions League match, which Shandong played against Al-Ittihad, Pažin was accused of spitting at the referee for which he was punished. The last club he played for was Lokomotiv Mezdra, from 2008 to 2010, where he ended his playing career.

== International career ==
Pažin made his debut for Bulgaria in an August 2000 friendly match against Belgium in Sofia and has earned a total of 31 caps, scoring no goals. He was part of the Bulgarian 2004 European Football Championship team, which was eliminated in the first round, finishing bottom of Group C, having finished top of Qualifying Group 8 in the pre-tournament phase. His final international was against Italy at that tournament in Portugal. Pažin is the most capped non-Bulgarian-born player to appear for the national side.

== Honours ==
Partizan

- First League of FR Yugoslavia: 1996, 1997, 1999
- FR Yugoslavia Cup: 1998

Levski Sofia

- Bulgarian A PFG: 2000
- Bulgarian Cup: 2000

Kocaelispor

- Turkish Cup: 2002

Shakhtar Donetsk

- Ukrainian Premier League: 2005
- Ukrainian Cup: 2004

Shandong Luneng

- Chinese Super League: 2006
- Chinese FA Cup: 2006
