= Clément Lebe =

Cameroonian footballer

Personal information
- Full name: Clément Lebe
- Date of birth: January 9, 1979 (age 47)
- Place of birth: Cameroon
- Height: 1.83 m (6 ft 0 in)
- Position: Defender

Senior career*
Years	Team	Apps	(Gls)
1998–2001	Racing FC Bafoussam		
2002–2007	Liaoning F.C.	90	(7)
2002	→ Liaoning Xingguang (loan)	17	(1)
2008	Yanbian FC	21	(0)
2010	Yanbian FC	19	(0)

International career^{‡}
1999	Cameroon U-20		
- * Club domestic league appearances and goals as of 3 March 2010 ‡ National team caps and goals as of 3 March 2010

Clément Lebe (born January 9, 1979) is a Cameroonian football player who is currently playing for Yanbian FC.

Lebe began his career with Racing FC Bafoussam in 1998.he was part of Cameroon U-20 national team in 1999 FIFA World Youth Championship.

In 2002, Lebe was signed by Liaoning F.C. for a fee of 100,000 yuan. He was loaned to the second-tier club Liaoning Xingguang for one season and returned to Liaoning in 2003.

In 2008, he moved to Yanbian FC and was released in the end of season 2008.

On 2 March 2010, Yanbian FC resigned Lebe for one year.
