= Zheng Bin =

Chinese footballer and coach

Zheng Bin 郑斌
Personal information
- Date of birth: July 4, 1977 (age 49)
- Place of birth: Wuhan, Hubei, China
- Height: 1.74 m (5 ft 9 in)
- Positions: Left midfielder; striker

Youth career
- 1996–1998: Jianlibao Youth

Senior career*
Years	Team	Apps	(Gls)
1998–2002	Wuhan Hongjinlong	65	(2)
2003–2004	Shenzhen Jianlibao	40	(2)
2005–2008	Wuhan Huanghelou	92	(14)
2009	Shenzhen Shangqingyin	19	(1)
2010–2011	Wuhan Zall	23	(2)

International career^{‡}
2003–2008	China	35	(1)

Managerial career
- 2012–2014: Wuhan Zall (assistant)
- 2014–2015: Wuhan Zall
- 2015–2017: Hebei CFFC (assistant)
- 2018–2019: Wuhan Zall (assistant)
- 2020–2021: China (assistant)
- 2022: Tianjin Jinmen Tiger (technical director)
Medal record
Representing China
Men's football
AFC Asian Cup
Silver medal – second place	2004 China	Team
East Asian Football Championship
Bronze medal – third place	2003 Japan	Team
Gold medal – first place	2005 South Korea	Team
- * Club domestic league appearances and goals as of 22 December 2023 ‡ National team caps and goals as of 16 October 2012

Zheng Bin (simplified Chinese: 郑斌; traditional Chinese: 鄭斌; pinyin: Zhèng Bīn; born July 4, 1977) is a Chinese football coach and a former international who played as a left midfielder or striker.

As a player he represented Shenzhen Jianlibao, Wuhan Huanghelou and Wuhan Zall while internationally he played for the Chinese national team that participated in the 2004 AFC Asian Cup. Since retiring he moved into management, and gained his first head coaching position with Wuhan Zall.

== Club career ==
=== Early career ===
As with all the most promising young Chinese players Zheng Bin would quickly be included in the short-lived Chinese national youth team program to study football abroad in a training programme sponsored by Jianlibao and called the Chinese Jianlibao Youth Football Team. After graduating through the Jianlibao Youth Team he would return to his hometown to play for Wuhan Hongjinlong to start his professional football career. In his debut season he would play six games in his debut season. He would then go on to play in the majority of Wuhan's games throughout the 1999 league season that saw the team relegated.

=== Shenzhen Jianlibao ===
The following seasons would see him remain with Wuhan in their attempts to return to the top tier until Shenzhen Jianlibao's Head coach Zhu Guanghu showed an interest within him. Zheng Bin would eventually join Shenzhen Jianlibao at the beginning of the 2003 league season. The move would immediately become very successful for him when he quickly established himself within the team in his debut season and then in his second season help the team to win the 2004 Chinese Super League title.

=== Return to Wuhan ===
Despite just winning the league title with Shenzhen Jianlibao the club had many financial difficulties and when his previous club just having won promotion and offering 3,500,000 RMB for the return of his services Zheng Bin would immediately rejoin them. Once again this turned out to be a successful transfer for him when he once again settled straight away within the team and this time go on to win the 2005 Chinese Super League Cup. He would soon go on to captain the team until the club controversially disbanded for what they believed was unfair punishment by the Chinese Football Association after the club's management did not accept the punishment given to them by the Chinese Football Association after a scuffle broke out during a league game against Beijing Guoan on September 27, 2008.

=== Return to Shenzhen ===
Without a club Zheng Bin would return to Shenzhen Jianlibao (who had renamed themselves Shenzhen Shangqingyin) at the beginning of the 2009 league season. While he was not an immediate first choice player at the start of the season, once he was given his chance to play he would quickly show his experience within the team and would quickly become a regular within the team.

=== Join Hubei Oriental ===
At the 2010 season, the new Wuhan club Hubei Oriental had successfully promoted to China League One. Zheng returned to Wuhan again and joined the team to play the new season.

== International career ==
Zheng Bin would be included in the Chinese squad and go on to make his debut in a friendly against Costa Rica on September 7, 2003 in a 2-0 defeat. Despite the result he would go on to become a regular within the team and his versatility within midfield would see him go on to be included in the squad that went to the 2004 AFC Asian Cup that came runners-up. He would go on to play in several FIFA World Cup qualifiers and the 2007 AFC Asian Cup, however once the tournament ended he would lose favour within the team.

== End of football career ==
On 29 January 2026, Zheng was given a lifetime ban for match-fixing by the Chinese Football Association.

== Honours ==
Shenzhen Jianlibao

- Chinese Super League: 2004

Wuhan Huanghelou

- Chinese Super League Cup: 2005
