= Shanghai United F.C. =

Chinese football club

Shanghai United 上海联城
- Full name: Shanghai United F.C. 上海联城足球俱乐部
- Short name: SUFC
- Founded: February 2000; 25 years ago as Dalian Sidelong
- Dissolved: 8 February 2007; 18 years ago Merged with Shanghai Shenhua
- Ground: Yuanshen Sports Centre Stadium, Shanghai, China
- Capacity: 16,000
Home colours	Away colours

Shanghai United F.C (Chinese: 上海联城足球俱乐部) was a Chinese professional football club based in Shanghai, who last played in the 16,000 seater Yuanshen Sports Centre Stadium in the Chinese Super League. The club was founded by Dalian Shide F.C. on 1 February 2000 and was originally known as Dalian Sidelong. The club was initially used as youth team who were allowed to compete in the Chinese football league pyramid until the club was eventually sold to businessman Zhu Jun, the owner of China's second-largest online gaming company The9 in 2005. He moved the club to Shanghai until 2007 when he bought a majority share of inner-city rivals Shanghai Shenhua, thus began to merge the two clubs. Shanghai United no longer exists in name and is replaced by Shanghai Shenhua.

== History ==
In 2004, Zhuhai Zobon F.C. played in the Chinese Football Association Jia League. When they won promotion to the Chinese Super League, their owners, Shanghai Zobon Real Estate Co., moved the team from Zhuhai to Shanghai, and renamed it to Shanghai Zobon F.C.. After the 2005 season they were again renamed to Shanghai United F.C..

Before the 2007 season, Zhu Jun bought a majority share in the in-city rival Shanghai Shenhua, thus began to merge the two clubs. Shanghai United no longer exists in name and is replaced by Shanghai Shenhua. The new Shenhua team combines players from the two original teams. Due to the merger, there are only 15 teams in the CSL.

== Name history ==
- 2000–02: Dalian Sidelong (大连赛德隆)
- 2003: Zhuhai Anping (珠海安平)
- 2004: Zhuhai Zobon (珠海中邦)
- 2005: Shanghai Zobon (上海中邦)
- 2006–07: Shanghai United (上海联城)

== Honours ==
- Chinese Jia B League/China League One (Second Tier League)
  - Runners-up: 2002, 2004
- Chinese Yi League/China League Two (Third Tier League)
  - Winners: 2001

== Results ==
All-time league rankings

Season	2000	2001	2002	2003	2004	2005	2006
Division	3	3	2	2	2	1	1
Position	7	1	2	8	2	11	7

- ^1 no promotion

== See also ==
- Shanghai Stars
- Shanghai Shenhua
