= Marek Zając =

Polish footballer and manager

Personal information
- Full name: Marek Zając
- Date of birth: 17 September 1973 (age 53)
- Place of birth: Kraków, Poland
- Height: 1.86 m (6 ft 1 in)
- Position: Defender

Team information
- Current team: MUST IPO (manager)

Senior career*
Years	Team	Apps	(Gls)
1992–1995	Cracovia		
1995–1997	Hutnik Kraków	36	(4)
1997–2002	Wisła Kraków	103	(16)
2002	Denizlispor	10	(1)
2002–2003	Zagłębie Lubin	21	(2)
2003–2004	Akçaabat Sebatspor	23	(1)
2003–2008	Shenzhen Jianlibao	96	(5)
2009	Liaoning Hongyun	15	(2)

International career
2000–2003	Poland	4	(0)

Managerial career
- 2011: Guangzhou R&F (assistant)
- 2017–2018: R&F (Hong Kong)
- 2026–: MUST IPO
- * Club domestic league appearances and goals

Marek Zając (born 17 September 1973) is a Polish professional football manager and former player who currently manages Macanese club MUST IPO. A versatile defender, he experienced considerable success with Wisła Kraków before moving to Turkey to play for Süper Lig sides Denizlispor and A. Sebatspor until he joined Chinese side Shenzhen Jianlibao and became a prominent figure within the team for five seasons.

== Club career ==
Zając previously played for Cracovia and Hutnik Kraków, before he moved to Polish powerhouse Wisła Kraków, where he experienced considerable success by winning two league titles and a call-up to the Poland national team. This saw Turkish side Denizlispor interested with his services, and Zając moved there for the 2001–02 campaign, however he only played in ten league games before returning to Poland with Zagłębie Lubin the following season. With another chance to play in the Süper Lig, Zając joined Akçaabat Sebatspor in 2003, where he stayed for one season.

Halfway through the 2004 Chinese league season, Zając moved to Shenzhen Jianlibao to help them in their push for the league title. Achieving this, he remained with the team for the next five seasons despite the exit of most of their top stars and manager. When he left the team at the end of the 2008 league season, he became the team's longest serving foreigner. Zając remained in China and joined second tier side Liaoning Hongyun at the beginning of the 2009 league season and helped the team win the division title.

== International career ==
Zając made two appearances for the Poland national team.

== Managerial statistics ==
As of 13 May 2018

Managerial record by team and tenure
Team	From	To	Record				
Team	From	To	G	W	D	L	Win %
R&F (Hong Kong)	6 July 2017	12 March 2018	18	6	1	11	33.33
MUST IPO	27 February 2026	Present	0	0	0	0	—
Total			18	6	1	11	33.33

== Honours ==
Wisła Kraków

- Ekstraklasa: 1998–99, 2000–01
- Polish League Cup: 2000–01
- Polish Super Cup: 2001

Shenzhen Shangqingyin

- Chinese Super League: 2004

Liaoning Hongyun

- China League One: 2009
