= Ivan Bulat =

Croatian footballer and manager

Personal information
- Date of birth: 24 June 1975 (age 51)
- Place of birth: Šibenik, SR Croatia, SFR Yugoslavia
- Height: 1.82 m (6 ft 0 in)
- Position: Midfielder

Team information
- Current team: Šibenik (director of football)

Youth career
- Šibenik

Senior career*
Years	Team	Apps	(Gls)
1991–1996	Šibenik	45	(3)
1996–1998	Osijek	47	(6)
1998–1999	Šibenik	26	(2)
1999–2000	Hapoel Petach-Tikva	29	(4)
2000	Tzafririm Holon	18	(1)
2001	Ahi Nazareth		
2001-2002	NK Zagreb	0	(0)
2002–2003	Šibenik	30	(8)
2003–2004	Shanghai International		
2004–2005	Chongqing Lifan		
2005–2006	Xi'an Chanba		
2006–2007	Chengdu Blades		
2008–2009	Šibenik	17	(2)
2009–2010	Dinara Knin		

International career
1996–1997	Croatia U21	5	(1)

Managerial career
- 2013: Šibenik (caretaker)
- * Club domestic league appearances and goals

Ivan Bulat (Croatian pronunciation: [ǐʋan bùlat]; born 24 June 1975) is a Croatian retired footballer who played as a midfielder. He currently serves as a director of football of Croatian club HNK Šibenik.

Bulat was appointed as the director of football of his hometown club in summer of 2017, when his older brother Josip became the club's chairman of the supervisory board.

== International career ==
Bulat made five appearances for the Croatia national under-21 team.

== Honours ==
=== Player ===
NK Zagreb

- Croatian First League: 2001–02
