= Pei Encai =

Chinese footballer and manager

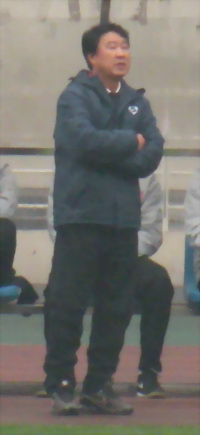

Personal information
- Full name: Pei Encai
- Date of birth: December 1, 1953 (age 72)
- Place of birth: Tianjin, China
- Height: 1.79 m (5 ft 10 1/2 in)

Senior career*
Years	Team	Apps	(Gls)
1972–1982	Bayi		

Managerial career
- 1983–1988: Bayi (Youth)
- 1990: Beijing Military
- 1996–1998: Bayi (Youth)
- 1997–1998: China U-20 (Assistant)
- 1998: Bayi (Assistant)
- 1999: Huizhou PLA Saonong
- 2003: Bayi
- 2003–2005: Wuhan Huanghelou
- 2005: China (women)
- 2006–2007: Wuhan Optics Valley
- 2007: Henan Construction
- 2008–2010: Jiangsu Sainty
- 2011: Chongqing F.C.
- 2013: Tianjin Songjiang
- 2018: Hunan Billows
- 2019: Guangxi Baoyun
- 2021–2022: Xinjiang Tianshan Leopard
- * Club domestic league appearances and goals

Pei Encai (Chinese: 裴恩才; pinyin: Péi ēncái; born 1 December 1953) is a Chinese football manager and a former player.

== Playing career ==
Pei Encai would spend his youth within the Chinese military where he rose to be a Colonel. While in the army he would show to be promising midfielder and would work his way up to play for countries top army football team Bayi Football Team where he spent his whole career for them. At Bayi he would have a successful career where he won several league titles, however despite these trophies he never received an international call-up and unfortunately had to retire early due to injury.

== Management career ==
Pei became a coach of the youth team in the Bayi Football Team in 1983 and won his first title in a national youth league in 1985. He led Huizhou PLA Saonon to the second division in 1998, and became the head coach of the Bayi Football Team in 2003. However, the Bayi Football Team, together with several other military-owned teams, were dismantled as part of the reorganization of the People's Liberation Army in 2003, and Pei left the team.

Pei became the head coach of Wuhan Huanghelou in June 2003, and led them to the top of the Chinese Football Association Jia League and the promotion to Chinese Super League in 2004. After the promotion, the team had an incredible start of seventh consecutive victories in the 2005 season before he was summoned by the Chinese Football Association (CFA).

Pei was the national coach of the China women's national football team between May 2005 and November 2005. Pei resigned from women's national football team at November 2005, and is succeeded by Ma Liangxing, the former head coach of the team between 2001 and 2003. He returned to the Wuhan team afterwards.

On September 25, 2007, Pei resigned from Wuhan. A week later, Henan Construction announced him as the replacement of the head coach Men Wenfeng. After finishing the season, he was replaced by Jia Xiuquan in December.

He was the head coach of Chinese club Jiangsu Sainty from season 2008 to 2010.

== Honours ==
=== Player ===
Bayi Football Team

- Chinese Jia-A League: 1974, 1977, 1981

=== Manager ===
Wuhan Huanghelou

- Chinese Football Association Jia League: 2004

Jiangsu Sainty

- Chinese Football Association Jia League: 2008

== See also ==
- Jia Xiuquan
- Hao Haidong
