= Wuhan Yangtze River F.C. =

Chinese former professional football club

Wuhan Yangtze River Wǔhàn Chángjiāng 武汉长江
- Full name: Wuhan Yangtze River Football Club 武汉长江足球俱乐部
- Nickname: Han Army
- Founded: 17 February 2009; 17 years ago
- Dissolved: 25 January 2023; 3 years ago

Wuhan Yangtze River Football Club, formerly Wuhan Zall Football Club (simplified Chinese: 武汉长江; traditional Chinese: 武漢長江; pinyin: Wǔhàn Chángjiāng), was a Chinese professional football club that participated in the Chinese Super League under license from the Chinese Football Association (CFA). The team was based in Wuhan, Hubei and their home stadium was the Dongxihu Sports Centre that has a seating capacity of 30,000. Their current majority shareholder is the investment company Wuhan Zall Development Holding Co. Ltd.

The club was founded in 2009 after the withdrawal and then dissolution of its predecessor Wuhan Optics Valley. They entered at the start of the 2009 league campaign at the bottom of the professional Chinese football league pyramid. The team won promotion to the 2013 Chinese Super League after coming runners-up in the 2012 China League One, and spent only one season in the top flight before being relegated back down. In 2018, the team won the League One again and earned their second season in the top flight. They stayed there until the 2022 Super League, where they were once again relegated to League One after finishing 16th.

On 25 January 2023, the club announced that it decided to withdraw its participation in any competition managed by the Chinese Football Association, which means that the club has dissolved.

== History ==
=== 2009–2011: Hubei Luyin ===
Hubei Luyin was founded in February, 2009 after its predecessor Wuhan Optics Valley withdrew from the top tier because of its controversial punishment in October 2008 after the club had a dispute with the Chinese Football Association over the club's on-field behaviour against Beijing Guoan in a 27 September 2008 league game. Due to their withdrawal they were unable to register and participate in any professional Chinese tournaments, however the Hubei Province football association decided that due to the lack of representation of any Hubei teams within the Chinese football league system they would help create a new team to represent Hubei and use the Wuhan U-19 team as well as the Hubei youth team as the foundation for the squad. This saw the establishment of a new football club on the 26 February 2009 when the Hubei Luyin officially registered itself within the Chinese Football Association and start at the bottom of the professional football system in the third tier. The club would show their unusual strength in depth when they would breeze through the regional section of the league campaign and enter into the play-off finals where they lost their only game of the season Hunan Billows F.C. in a penalty shoot out. Despite the defeat the club would win promotion to the second tier and to strengthen their team they bought back the contracts of several Wuhan Optics Valley players who were not permanently sold off.

=== 2011–2018: Wuhan Zall ===
With the club in the second tier they would go through a period of joint investment from several parties until 14 December 2011 saw the Zall Group take ownership of the club and rename them Wuhan Zall Football Club as well as changing the team's colours back to orange, which was the club's predecessor's main colours. Initially the new owners saw the team struggle throughout the 2012 league season and decided to sack the existing manager Jose Carlos de Oliveira and replace him with Zheng Xiong on a caretaker basis. As the season went on the results considerably improved under Zheng Xiong who was given a full-time contract before guiding Wuhan Zall to second within the league and promotion to the Chinese Super League. The club's start in the 2013 league season was not a success and when the team went six games without a win, Zheng resigned. The former Shandong Luneng Head coach who had won the Chinese Super League, Ljubiša Tumbaković was brought in to manage the team, however despite his experience in the league he was unable to help the club avoid relegation and he was sacked before the season was finished. In 2015 the football club was sold to a private company Wuhan Zall Development Holding Co. Ltd. under the ownership of their chairman Yan Zhi and his relatives, for RMB 20,630,000.

=== 2019–2022: Super League ===
After several seasons within the second tier, the club brought in Li Tie as the Head Coach, a manager who had previously guided Hebei China Fortune F.C. to the top tier. In his debut season Li Tie was able to guide Wuhan to the victory of the division championship and promotion back into the Chinese Super League at the end of the 2018 league season.

During the 2022 season Wuhan Yangtze River F.C. lost 3–1 to Chengdu Rongcheng, which resulted in Wuhan being relegated to China League One for the 2023 season. However, their participation did not happen as the club got dissolved at the start of 2023.

== Name history ==
- 2009–2010: Hubei Luyin F.C. (湖北绿茵)
- 2011: Hubei Wuhan Zhongbo F.C. (湖北武汉中博)
- 2012–2020: Wuhan Zall F.C. (武汉卓尔)
- 2021: Wuhan F.C. (武汉)
- 2022: Wuhan Yangtze River F.C. (武汉长江)

== Retired numbers ==
8 Yao Hanlin

== Managerial history ==
- (China) Li Jun (2009–10)
- (China) Li Xiao (2011)
- (Brazil) Jose Carlos de Oliveira (2011–12)
- (China) Zheng Xiong (24 April 2012 – 21 April 2013)
- (Serbia) Ljubiša Tumbaković (22 April 2013 – 18 August 2013)
- (China) Wang Jun (19 August 2013 – 10 December 2013)
- (Croatia) Dražen Besek (11 December 2013 – September 2014)
- (China) Zheng Bin (September 2014 – 17 July 2015)
- (China) Zheng Xiong (17 July 2015 – 26 June 2016)
- (Italy) Ciro Ferrara (July 2016 – 20 March 2017)
- (China) Tang Yaodong (30 March 2017 – 9 July 2017)
- (China) Chen Yang (9 July 2017 – 10 November 2017)
- (China) Li Tie (16 November 2017 – 2 January 2020)
- (Spain) José Manuel González López (4 January 2020 – 24 September 2020)
- (China) Pang Li (24 September 2020 – 27 December 2020)
- (China) Li Xiaopeng (27 December 2020 – 3 December 2021)
- (China) Li Jinyu (4 December 2021 – 25 January 2023)

== See also ==
- Wuhan Sports Center
- Li Xingqi

== Results ==
- As of the end of 2022 season.

All-time league rankings
Year	Tier	Pld	W	D	L	GF	GA	GD	Pts	Pos	Cup	AFC	Att./G	Stadium
2009	3	13	8	5	0	16	2	+14	24^{1}	2	NH	DNQ		Xinhua Road Sports Center
2010	2	24	10	7	7	30	24	+6	37	5	NH	DNQ		Xinhua Road Sports Center
2011	2	26	8	9	9	26	28	−2	33	7	R1	DNQ		Xinhua Road Sports Center
2012	2	30	16	6	8	40	29	+11	54	2	R2	DNQ	6,701	Xinhua Road Sports Center
2013	1	30	3	7	20	24	58	−36	16	16	R3	DNQ	14,403	Wuhan Sports Center Stadium
2014	2	30	18	3	9	46	31	+15	57	3	R2	DNQ	8,457	Xinhua Road Sports Center
2015	2	30	8	12	10	31	30	+1	36	10	R2	DNQ	5,300	Xinhua Road Sports Center
2016	2	30	12	7	11	31	33	−2	43	6	R2	DNQ	4,853	Xinhua Road Sports Center
2017	2	30	13	8	9	47	40	+7	47	5	R2	DNQ	13,525	Wuhan Sports Center Stadium
2018	2	30	18	9	3	60	25	+35	63	1	R4	DNQ	6,884	Zhongnan University of Economics and Law Stadium
2019	1	30	12	8	10	41	41	0	44	6	R4	DNQ	20,484	Wuhan Five Rings Sports Center
2020	1	20	7	4	9	22	22	0	25	15	-	DNQ	N/A	Wuhan Five Rings Sports Center
2021	1	22	3	11	8	23	30	-7	20	14	QF	DNQ		Wuhan Five Rings Sports Center
2022	1	34	8	4	22	34	71	-37	19^{2}	16	R2	DNQ		Wuhan Five Rings Sports Center

- ^1 in group stage
- ^2 Wuhan Yangtze River had 3 points deducted due to unpaid salaries on 5 November 2022 and had 6 points deducted due to unpaid salaries on 23 November 2022.

Key

	China top division
	China second division
	China third division
W	Winners
RU	Runners-up
3	Third place
	Relegated

- Pld = Played
- W = Games won
- D = Games drawn
- L = Games lost
- F = Goals for
- A = Goals against
- Pts = Points
- Pos = Final position
- DNQ = Did not qualify
- DNE = Did not enter
- NH = Not Held
- – = Does Not Exist
- R1 = Round 1
- R2 = Round 2
- R3 = Round 3
- R4 = Round 4
- F = Final
- SF = Semi-finals
- QF = Quarter-finals
- R16 = Round of 16
- Group = Group stage
- GS2 = Second Group stage
- QR1 = First Qualifying Round
- QR2 = Second Qualifying Round
- QR3 = Third Qualifying Round
