= Wuhan Optics Valley F.C. =

Chinese football club

Wuhan Optics Valley Wǔhàn Guānggǔ 武汉光谷
- Full name: Hubei Wuhan Professional F.C. 湖北武汉职业足球俱乐部
- Nicknames: Jiu Tou Niao (Nine Heads Phoenix), Han Jun (Han Army)
- Founded: 1954; 72 years ago (Amateur); 1994; 32 years ago (Professional)
- Dissolved: 2008; 18 years ago
- Ground: Xinhua Road Sports Center and Wuhan Sports Center Stadium, Wuhan, Hubei, China
- Capacity: 36,000 and 60,000
Home colours	Away colours

Wuhan Optics Valley Football Club (simplified Chinese: 武汉光谷; traditional Chinese: 武漢光谷; pinyin: Wǔhàn Guānggǔ) is a defunct football club that was located in the city of Wuhan, Hubei province, China. The club's home stadium was Xinhua Road Sports Center, while the important matches were played at the more modern stadium Wuhan Sports Center in China. Their fans were mainly from Hubei province and the club had supporters from the city of Wuhan, and the surrounding cities of Ezhou, Huangshi, and Xiaogan. It was founded in 1954 as the Hubei Football Team, while the professional football team was founded in February 1994. In 2008, the club quit the Chinese Super League because of what it believed to be unfair punishment after the club had a dispute with the Chinese Football Association over the club's on-field behaviour against Beijing Guoan in a league game. Some of its players formed a new team called Hubei Luyin and made a return to Chinese Super League in 2013.

== History ==
=== Hubei Football Team ===
The club was formed in 1954 by the local Hubei province sports body to take part in China's national football league tournament. They entered the league in the 1955 season and finished 10th. After several years struggling within the division, the club found themselves in the second tier by the 1958 season. After achieving a fourth-place finish they were promoted to the top division. By 1960 the club had renamed themselves the Hubei Football Team and for a short period they adapted better within the league. By the end of the 1963 season the club were relegated to the second division until the Chinese Cultural Revolution saw football in China halted. When football returned in 1973 the club were allowed to enter straight back into the top tier. From then on the club predominantly remained a top division team. They narrowly missed out on winning their first league title to Bayi Football Team on goal difference in the 1986 league season. They could not improve upon that result and were relegated at the end of the 1988 league season. In response to this failure the local Hubei government pushed for better representation within the league pyramid, and several new teams were formed in the Hubei region.

=== Professionalism ===
While the club was in the second tier, the Chinese Football Association were starting to demand full professionalism throughout the league. Hubei football team decide to merge with the Wuhan Football Team to form a fully professional unit in February 1994 and be the sole representative of the Hubei region in the Chinese league pyramid. With former player Yin Lihua as their manager the club gradually improved their league standings and won the second tier title at the end of the 1997 league season.

The club's time in the top tier did not last very long and they were soon relegated back into the second tier. They brought in Pei Encai as their new manager in 2004. He won the division title and promotion in his debut season. Back within the top tier of the rebranded Chinese Super League, the team were led-out by local players such as Li Hao, Zheng Bin and Zhang Xinxin. Their foreign contingent of Brazilians such as Emerson Roberto Conceicao Aleixo, Gílson Domingos Rezende Agostinho, and Vicente de Paula Neto helped the club to a seven-game winning streak early in the season. Pei Encai was hired away by the Chinese women's football team. Chen Fangping came in as the new manager during the season and carried on Pei Encai's work. Despite several injuries to some key players the club were able to win the 2005 Chinese Super League Cup by beating Shenzhen Jianlibao 3–1 on aggregate after a 1:1 away match and 2:0 home match fixture.

After his brief stint as the Chinese women's team coach, Pei Encai returned to the club. He again promoted local talent by including defenders Ai Zhibo and Cai Xi and midfielders Zhou Yi and Chinese U-23 player Zhou Heng on the team. However, he was unable to achieve the same success upon his return and the club finished tenth. In the following season youngsters Deng Zhuoxiang, Chinese U-23 players Zeng Cheng, Rong Hao and Di You joined the BBC team. Rong Hao and Di You suffered knee injuries during the season. Despite finishing seventh Pei Encai and the club decided to part way s and Chen Fangping was brought back in as a manager at the beginning of the 2008 Chinese Super League. His use of inappropriate tactics led the club quickly into the relegation zone, and he was soon sacked. Former Chinese football team manager Zhu Guanghu was then brought in to change the club's fortunes around. He decided that the club needed to strengthen their defence and brought in Chinese international Li Weifeng for three million yuan.

=== Disbandment ===
On 27 September 2008 the club were playing the eighteenth league game out of thirty against Beijing Guoan when Li Weifeng and Beijing player Lu Jiang had a scuffle on the field. The Chinese FA decided to issue each player with an eight match ban and a fine of 1,170 USD. Wuhan chairman Shen Liefeng refused to accept the punishment and threatened to quit the Chinese football league and sought legal advice. On 1 October 2008, the club and the Chinese FA could not come to an agreement. The club decided to quit the league. With Wuhan quitting the Chinese Super League, they were fined a further US$44,000 by the Chinese FA, had all their matches awarded 3–0 against them, and were banned from entering any further league seasons in any division. All the senior players were either sold or loaned out. The local Hubei government took over the club's youth team and formed a new club called Hubei Luyin to take part at the bottom of the Chinese league system within the third tier at the beginning of the 2009 league season.

== Name history ==
FC Wuhan Old Logo

- 1954–1993 Hubei (湖北)
- 1994–1995 Hubei WISCO (湖北武钢)
- 1996 Hubei Mailyard (湖北美尔雅)
- 1997–1998 Wuhan Yaqi (武汉雅琪)
- 1999–2000 Wuhan Hongtao K (武汉红桃K)
- 2001 Wuhan Hongjinlong (武汉红金龙)
- 2002 Wuhan Donghu Hi-Tech (武汉东湖高科)
- 2003 Wuhan Guoce Bluestar (武汉国测蓝星)
- 2004–2005 Wuhan Huanghelou (武汉黄鹤楼)
- 2006–2008 Wuhan Optics Valley (武汉光谷).

== Managerial history ==
Managers who have coached the team since the club became a professional unit back in 1994.

- (China) Ding Sanshi (1994–95)
- (China) Yin Lihua (1995–98)
- (South Korea) Park Jong-hwan (1998)
- (China) Qi Wusheng (1998–99)
- (China) Hu Zhigang (1999)
- (China) Zhu Bo (interim) (April 1999 – July 99)
- (Serbia) Milorad Kosanović (1999)
- (China) Yin Lihua (2000–01)
- (China) Liu Wuyi (2001–03)
- (China) Pei Encai (July 2003 – May 5)
- (China) Chen Fangping (2005)
- (China) Pei Encai (Dec 2005 – Sept 07)
- (China) Chen Fangping (2007–08)
- (China) Zhu Guanghu (2008)

== Honours ==
All-time honours list including semi-professional period.

=== League ===
- Chinese Jia-B League / China League One (Second Tier League)

1980, 1997, 2004

=== Cups ===
- Chinese Super League Cup

2005

=== Reserve Team ===
- Reserve League Champions

2008

== Results ==
All-time League Rankings

- As of the end of 2008 season.

Year	Div	Pld	W	D	L	GF	GA	GD	Pts	Pos.	FA Cup	Super Cup	AFC	Att./G	Stadium
1955	1	10	1	1	8	9	39	−30	3	10	–	–	–		
1956	1	4	0	1	4	4	14	−10	5	10	–	–	–		
1957	1	20	5	2	13	17	40	−23	32	11	–	–	–		
1958	2	5^{1}	1^{1}	3^{1}	1^{1}	8^{1}	9^{1}	−1^{1}	10^{1}	4	–	–	–		
1960	1	14	5	4	5	11	15	−4	10^{1}	18	R1	–	–		
1961	1	9	1	5	3	9	11	−2	2^{2}	5^{2}	NH	–	–		
1962	1	18	4	8	6	22	35	−13	6^{1}	11	NH	–	–		
1963	1	16	3	9	4	11	13	−2	7^{1}	18	NH	–	–		
1964	2									3	NH	–	–		
1965	2									4	NH	–	–		
1973	1	8	6	2	0	22	5	+17	15	8	NH	–	–		
1974	1	3	2	1	0	3	1	+2	5^{1}	25	NH	–	–		
1976	1	8	4	3	1	9	3	+6	11	4^{3}	NH	–	–		
1977	1	18	8	6	4	28	18	+10	6^{1}	8	NH	–	–		
1978	1	30	6	13	11	26	32	−6	25	11	NH	–	–		
1979	1	30	3	11	16	21	45	−24	17	16	NH	–	–		
1980	2	30	17	9	4	46	21	+25	43	W	NH	–	–		
1981	1	30	11	–	19				22	13	NH	–	–		
1982	1	30	21	–	9	41	22	+19	42	RU	NH	–	–		
1983	1	14	5	–	9	12	20	−8	10	7^{3}	NH	–	–		
1984	1	30	9	–	21	32	48	−16	18	15	R1	–	–		
1985	1	15	8	–	7			– 9	16	11	R1	–	DNQ		
1986	1	14	7	7	0	19	7	+12	21	RU	R1	–	DNQ		
1987	1	14	3	4	7	13	20	−7	13	8	NH	–	DNQ		
1988	1	20	5	7	8	15	22	−7	22	15	NH	–	DNQ		
1989	2	22	9	6	7	27	25	+2	33	6	NH	–	DNQ		
1990	2	22	7	9	6	27	25	+2	30	3	DNQ	–	DNQ		
1991	2	16	4	5	7	15	18	−3	13	9	DNQ	–	DNQ		
1992	2	8	2	4	2	8	6	+2	8	3^{3}	R1	–	DNQ		
1993	2	5	3	0/1	1	6	6	0	6	3^{3}	NH	–	DNQ		
1994	2	20	9	7	4	41	26	+15	25	5	NH	–	DNQ		
1995	2	22	10	6	6	35	25	+10	36	3	DNQ	DNQ	DNQ		
1996	2	22	7	7	8	22	25	−3	28	6	R2	DNQ	DNQ		
1997	2	22	12	6	4	35	21	+14	42	W	R2	DNQ	DNQ		
1998	1	26	8	8	10	26	33	−7	32	8	R2	DNQ	DNQ	22,077	
1999	1	26	3	8	15	18	53	−35	17	14	R2	DNQ	DNQ	12,077	
2000	2	22	8	7	7	36	29	+7	31	6	SF	DNQ	DNQ		
2001	2	22	7	6	9	24	28	−4	27	9	QF	DNQ	DNQ		
2002	2	22	8	9	5	31	28	+3	33	3	R2	DNQ	DNQ		
2003	2	26	11	10	5	39	26	+13	43	5	R2	DNQ	DNQ		
2004	2	32	19	9	4	54	28	+26	66	W	R3	DNQ	DNQ		
2005	1	26	11	9	6	34	26	+8	42	5	R2	NH	DNQ	15,654	
2006	1	28	8	7	13	28	42	−14	31	10	R1	NH	DNQ	10,500	
2007	1	28	11	7	10	29	31	−2	40	7	NH	NH	DNQ	13,179	
2008	1	30	0	0	30	0	90	−90	0	16	NH	NH	DNQ	12,556	

No league games in 1959, 1966–72, 1975;

- ^1 In final group stage. ^2 In second group stage. ^3 In group stage.

Key

	China top division
	China second division
	China third division
W	Winners
RU	Runners-up
3	Third place
	Relegated

- Pld = Played
- W = Games won
- D = Games drawn
- L = Games lost
- F = Goals for
- A = Goals against
- Pts = Points
- Pos = Final position
- DNQ = Did not qualify
- DNE = Did not enter
- NH = Not Held
- - = Does Not Exist
- R1 = Round 1
- R2 = Round 2
- R3 = Round 3
- R4 = Round 4
- F = Final
- SF = Semi-finals
- QF = Quarter-finals
- R16 = Round of 16
- Group = Group stage
- GS2 = Second Group stage
- QR1 = First Qualifying Round
- QR2 = Second Qualifying Round
- QR3 = Third Qualifying Round

== See also ==
- Hubei Luyin F.C.
