= List of Chinese football transfers winter 2010 =

This is a list of Chinese football transfers for the 2010 season winter transfer window. Only moves from Super League and League One are listed. The transfer window opened from January 1 to March 10.

== Super League ==
=== Beijing Guoan ===
In: Note: Flags indicate national team as defined under FIFA eligibility rules; some limited exceptions apply. Players may hold more than one non-FIFA nationality.

No.	Pos.	Nation	Player
-	DF	CHN	Wu Hao (from Shandong Luneng)
-	MF	CHN	Wang Xiaolong (from Shandong Luneng)
-	FW	BRA	Valdo (from Hangzhou Greentown)
-	FW	AUS	Joel Griffiths (from (Australia) Newcastle United Jets)
-	DF	SCO	Maurice Ross (from (Scotland) Aberdeen)
-	MF	CHN	Xu Liang (from Guangzhou F.C.)

Out: Note: Flags indicate national team as defined under FIFA eligibility rules; some limited exceptions apply. Players may hold more than one non-FIFA nationality.

No.	Pos.	Nation	Player
3	DF	CMR	Paul (Released)
10	MF	HON	Emil Martínez (to (Mexico) Indios de Ciudad Juárez)
29	FW	AUS	Joel Griffiths (loan return to (Australia) Newcastle United Jets)
8	MF	CHN	Yang Pu (Retired)
28	FW	CHN	Guo Hui (to Dalian Aerbin)
14	MF	CHN	Wang Dong (to Shenzhen Ruby)
-	FW	CHN	Zhang Xu (to Anhui Jiufang)
12	GK	CHN	Zhang Lei (to Changsha Ginde)

=== Changchun Yatai ===
In:

No.	Pos.	Nation	Player
-	DF	KOR	Lee Se-In (from (South Korea) Gangwon FC)
-	FW	CRC	Johnny Woodly Lambert (from Chongqing Lifan)
-	DF	CHN	Cui Wei (from Guangzhou F.C.) (loan return)
-	MF	ARG	Sebastián Setti (from (Belgium) Royal Antwerp)

Out:

No.	Pos.	Nation	Player
12	MF	NGA	Gabriel Melkam (to Guangzhou F.C.)
10	FW	AZE	Branimir Subašić (loan return to (Serbia) Red Star Belgrade)
17	MF	CHN	Huang Jie (to Pudong Zobon)
35	MF	CHN	Shen Bo (to Anhui Jiufang)
-	FW	CHN	Wang Dawang (to Anhui Jiufang)

=== Changsha Ginde ===
In:

No.	Pos.	Nation	Player
-	DF	CHN	Liu Cheng (from Chengdu Blades)
-	GK	CHN	Zhang Lei (from Beijing Guoan)
-	DF	KOR	Woo Choo-Young (from (South Korea) Incheon Korail)
-	FW	BRA	Sandro (from Shandong Luneng)
-	FW	COD	M'peti Nimba (from (Israel) Ironi Kiryat Shmona)
-	FW	NGA	Akanni-Sunday Wasiu (from (Republic of Ireland) Cork City)
-	MF	CRO	Frane Čačić (from (Croatia) NK Vinogradar)

Out:

No.	Pos.	Nation	Player
11	FW	KOR	Kim Eun-Jung (to (South Korea) Jeju United)
29	GK	CHN	Song Zhenyu (to Chengdu Blades)
19	MF	CHN	Dai Qinhua (to Hunan Billows)
32	MF	CHN	Li Chunyu (to (Serbia) FK Rad)
2	DF	KOR	Sim Jae-Won (released)
10	FW	BRA	Jefferson (released)
12	DF	ZAM	Billy Mwanza (released)
16	MF	CHN	Zhang Xiaobin (to Tianjin Teda)

=== Chongqing Lifan ===
In:

No.	Pos.	Nation	Player
-	MF	CHN	Zhou Heng (from Hubei Greenery)
-	MF	CHN	Wu Peng (from Hubei Greenery)
-	GK	CHN	Tian Xu (from Tianjin Teda)
-	DF	CHN	Li Yi'nan (from Pudong Zobon)
-	DF	CIV	Mariko Daouda (Free Agent)
-	DF	KOR	Cho Se-Kwon (from Liaoning F.C.)
-	DF	UGA	Andrew Mwesigwa (from (Iceland) ÍBV)
-	FW	SRB	Dušan Đokić (from (Belgium) Club Brugge)

Out:

No.	Pos.	Nation	Player
37	FW	BRA	Aílton (to (Germany) KFC Uerdingen)
9	FW	CRC	Johnny Woodly Lambert (to Changchun Yatai)
12	MF	CHN	Zhou Heng (loan return to Hubei Greenery)
29	MF	CHN	Wu Peng (loan return to Hubei Greenery)
38	DF	ISR	Liron Zarko (to (Israel) Bnei Sakhnin)

=== Dalian Shide ===
In:

No.	Pos.	Nation	Player
-	MF	CHN	Hu Zhaojun (loan return from Guangzhou F.C.)
-	FW	CHN	Zou Jie (loan return from Shenyang Dongjin)
-	DF	CRC	Porfirio López Meza (from (Costa Rica) Puntarenas)
-	FW	SRB	Borko Veselinović (from (South Korea) Incheon United)
-	MF	CRC	José Luis López Ramírez (loan from (Costa Rica) Deportivo Saprissa)

Out:

No.	Pos.	Nation	Player
20	FW	CHN	Li Kai (loan to Shaanxi Chanba)
7	MF	CHN	Zhao Xuri (to Shaanxi Chanba)
39	MF	CHN	Hu Zhaojun (loan to Guangzhou F.C.)
3	DF	CHN	Yang Lin (loan return to Henan Construction)
5	DF	CHI	Adan Vergara (to (Chile) Universidad Católica)
35	MF	CHN	Quan Heng (to Shenzhen Asia Travel)
9	FW	CHN	Dong Fangzhuo (to (Poland) Legia Warsaw)
-	MF	CHN	Song Kun (to Shenzhen Asia Travel)
-	DF	CHN	Song Long (to Qingdao Jonoon)
-	DF	CHN	Wang Sheng (loan return to Hubei Greenery)
-	GK	CHN	Guo Wei (loan to Beijing Baxy&Shengshi)

=== Hangzhou Greentown ===
In:

No.	Pos.	Nation	Player
-	FW	HON	Luis Alfredo Ramírez (from Guangzhou F.C.)
-	FW	HON	Jerry Palacios (from (Honduras) C.D. Marathón)
-	FW	CHN	Wang Song (from Chengdu Blades)
-	MF	CHN	Li Yan (from Shaanxi Chan-Ba)
-	DF	CHN	Sun Ji (from Shanghai Shenhua)
-	DF	HON	Mauricio Sabillón (from (Honduras) C.D. Marathón)
-	MF	CHN	Rong Hao (from Hubei Greenery)
-	MF	CHN	Rong Yu (from Tianjin Songjiang)
-	DF	CHN	Du Wei (from Shanghai Shenhua)

Out:

No.	Pos.	Nation	Player
14	MF	CHN	Yan Song (to (South Korea) Jeju United)
26	MF	CHN	Yang Fusheng (Released)
19	MF	CHN	Huang Long (Shenzhen Asia Travel)
4	DF	CHN	Chang Lin (Released)
10	FW	BRA	Valdo (to Beijing Guoan)
3	DF	BUL	Yordan Varbanov (to Anhui Jiufang)
28	MF	BRA	André (to (Brazil) Resende)
29	FW	NGA	Ernest (Released)
-	MF	CHN	Yang Zheng (to Nanjing Yoyo)
13	DF	CHN	Liu Bo (to Hunan Billows)
22	MF	CHN	Jiao Fengbo (to Nanchang Hengyuan)

=== Henan Jianye ===
In:

No.	Pos.	Nation	Player
-	DF	CHN	Yang Lin (loan return from Dalian Shide)
-	DF	SRB	Goran Gavrančić (from (Serbia) FK Partizan)
-	DF	CHN	Tan Wangsong (from Tianjin Teda)
-	FW	SEN	Amado Dialo (from (Morocco) Chabab Massira)
-	DF	SRB	Miloš Bajalica (from (Japan) Nagoya Grampus)
-	MF	CHN	Mirahmetjan Muzepper (from Shandong Luneng) (loan)

Out:

No.	Pos.	Nation	Player
30	MF	CHN	Jiang Kun (loan return to Shanghai Shenhua)
39	MF	CHN	Xu Xiaofei (Retired)
-	DF	CHN	Yang Lin (to Dalian Aerbin)

=== Jiangsu Sainty ===
In:

No.	Pos.	Nation	Player
-	MF	CHN	Gao Feng (from Shandong Luneng)
-	DF	CHN	Zhang Ke (from Shenyang Dongjin)
-	MF	CHN	Di You (from Pudong Zobon)
-	MF	CHN	Hu Zhuowei (from Hubei CTGU Kangtian)
-	FW	CHN	Zhi Yaqi (from Shenzhen Asia Travel)
-	FW	BRA	Éber Luís Cucchi (from Tianjin Teda)
-	DF	KOR	Park Jae-hong (from (South Korea) Gyeongnam FC)
-	FW	BRA	Pedro Henrique Martins (from (Brazil) Rio Claro)

Out:

No.	Pos.	Nation	Player
17	MF	CHN	Rong Hao (loan return to Hubei Greenery)
8	MF	CHN	Yao Hanlin (loan return to Hubei Greenery)
16	MF	CHN	Deng Zhuoxiang (loan return to Hubei Greenery)
15	MF	CHN	Hu Minghua (Retired)
30	FW	COL	Carlos Ceballos (to (Colombia) Cortuluá)
33	DF	UZB	Aleksandr Kletskov (loan return to (Uzbekistan) FC Pakhtakor Tashkent)
34	FW	BRA	Alemão (to (Brazil) Vitoria)
3	DF	CHN	Tang Tian (to (Indonesia) Persipura Jayapura)
5	DF	CHN	Ren Yongshun (to Shandong Luneng)
36	FW	CHN	Qu Cheng (loan to (Indonesia) Persipura Jayapura)

=== Liaoning Whowin ===
In:

No.	Pos.	Nation	Player
-	DF	AUS	Chris Coyne (loan from (Australia) Perth Glory)
-	MF	MLI	Boubacar Diarra (from (Switzerland) FC Lucerne)
-	MF	BRA	Andrezinho (from (Uruguay) River Plate)
-	FW	BRA	Felipe Tigrão (from (Brazil) Paulista)

Out:

No.	Pos.	Nation	Player
2	DF	KOR	Cho Se-Kwon (to Chongqing Lifan)
12	FW	BRA	Anderson Luiz (to Shenyang Dongjin)
24	MF	UZB	Jafar Irismetov (to (Uzbekistan) FK Samarqand-Dinamo)
35	DF	POL	Marek Zając (Released)

=== Nanchang Hengyuan ===
In:

No.	Pos.	Nation	Player
-	FW	BRA	Alex (from (Brazil) SE Palmeiras)
-	FW	BRA	Beto (from (Brazil) Bragantino)
-	MF	SYR	Adel Abdullah (from (Syria) Al-Ittihad Aleppo)
-	MF	CHN	Ye Zhanggen (from Shaanxi Chanba)
-	MF	CHN	Zou Zhongting (from Shaanxi Chanba)
-	DF	CHN	Lin Yincheng (from Shanghai East Asia)
-	MF	BRA	Johnny (from (Brazil) Alagoano)
-	FW	TRI	Kevaughn Connell (from (Trinidad and Tobago) San Juan Jabloteh)
-	MF	CHN	Jiao Fengbo (from Hangzhou Greentown)
-	MF	CHN	Zhang Tiangang (from Qingdao Hailifeng)

Out:

No.	Pos.	Nation	Player
9	FW	COL	Martín García (to (Mexico) Veracruz)
11	FW	BRA	Alex (Released)
15	DF	CAN	Rumbani Munthali (to Shenyang Dongjin)
17	FW	COL	Jaime Castrillón (to (Colombia) Once Caldas)

=== Qingdao Jonoon ===
In:

No.	Pos.	Nation	Player
-	DF	CHN	Zhang Fengyu (from Shandong Luneng)
-	DF	CHN	Li Peng (from Shandong Luneng)
-	DF	CHN	Song Long (from Dalian Shide)
-	MF	CRO	Stjepan Jukić (from NK Croatia Sesvete)
-	FW	SVN	Aleksander Rodić (loan from (Slovenia) Interblock Ljubljana)
-	MF	SRB	Ivan Vukomanović (free agent)
-	DF	KOR	Lee Sung-Min (from (South Korea) Yesan FC)
-	FW	SVN	Tomislav Mišura (loan from (Slovenia) Interblock Ljubljana)
-	DF	CHN	Li Linfeng (from Qingdao Hailifeng)
-	DF	CHN	Sha Yibo (from Qingdao Hailifeng)

Out:

No.	Pos.	Nation	Player
45	DF	IRQ	Hussein Alaa Hussein (to Shenzhen Ruby)
27	FW	CHN	Qu Bo (to Shaanxi Chan-Ba)
3	DF	POR	Hugo Carreira (Released)
4	DF	SRB	Marko Sočanac (Released)
38	MF	BFA	Abdoul-Aziz Nikiema (Released)
41	MF	SRB	Dragan Stančić (to Nanjing Yoyo)

=== Shaanxi Baorong Chanba ===
In:

No.	Pos.	Nation	Player
-	MF	CHN	Xu Qing (from Hubei Luyin)
-	DF	CHN	Sun Jihai (from Chengdu Blades)
-	FW	CHN	Li Kai (from Dalian Shide) (loan)
-	MF	CHN	Zhao Xuri (from Dalian Shide)
-	DF	CHN	Wan Houliang (loan return from (South Korea) Jeonbuk Hyundai Motors)
-	MF	CHN	Chen Jie (from Shandong Luneng)
-	FW	CHN	Mao Jianqing (from Shanghai Shenhua)
-	FW	CHN	Qu Bo (from Qingdao Jonoon)
-	MF	CHN	Du Fa (Free Agent)
-	FW	SLE	Mohamed Kallon (from (Sierra Leone) Kallon F.C.)
-	FW	FRA	Cédric Sabin (from (France) Vannes)
-	DF	USA	Lyle Martin (from (Canada) Vancouver Whitecaps)
-	GK	CHN	Mou Pengfei (from Qingdao Hailifeng)
-	DF	BRA	Célio (from (Brazil) Cascavel CR)

Out:

No.	Pos.	Nation	Player
10	FW	BRA	Vicente (to Shanghai Shenhua)
11	FW	BRA	Ronny (to (Brazil) América de Natal)
15	MF	CHN	Ye Zhanggen (to Nanchang Hengyuan)
30	MF	CHN	Zou Zhongting (to Nanchang Hengyuan)
8	MF	CHN	Li Yan (to Hangzhou Greentown)
3	DF	BRA	Estevão (Released)
26	MF	NGA	Edison Joseph (Released)

=== Shandong Luneng ===
In:

No.	Pos.	Nation	Player
-	MF	CHN	Zhou Haibin (from (Netherlands) PSV Eindhoven)
-	DF	SRB	Sinisa Radanovic (from (Serbia) Hajduk Kula)
-	MF	CHN	Chen Jie (from Shenzhen Asia Travel) (loan return)
-	DF	CRO	Carlos (loan from (Croatia) Dinamo Zagreb)
-	FW	NED	Fred Benson (loan from (Netherlands) RKC Waalwijk)
-	MF	CHN	Deng Zhuoxiang (from Hubei Greenery)
-	DF	CHN	Ren Yongshun (from Jiangsu Sainty)

Out:

No.	Pos.	Nation	Player
11	FW	BRA	Sandro (to Changsha Ginde)
4	DF	VEN	Alejandro Cichero (to (Venezuela) Caracas FC)
3	DF	CHN	Wu Hao (to Beijing Guoan)
15	MF	CHN	Wang Xiaolong (to Beijing Guoan)
16	DF	CHN	Gao Yao (Retired)
-	MF	CHN	Gao Feng (to Jiangsu Sainty)
-	MF	CHN	Chen Jie (to Shaanxi Chan-Ba)
-	DF	CHN	Zhang Fengyu (to Qingdao Jonoon)
-	DF	CHN	Li Peng (to Qingdao Jonoon)
-	MF	CHN	Mirahmetjan Muzepper (loan to Henan Construction)

=== Shanghai Shenhua ===
In:

No.	Pos.	Nation	Player
-	DF	CHN	Chen Lei (loan return from Shenzhen Asia Travel)
-	FW	CHN	Mao Jianqing (loan return from Shenzhen Asia Travel)
-	MF	CHN	Wu Xi (from Shijiazhuang Tiangong)
-	DF	CHN	Xiong Fei (from Nanjing Yoyo)
-	MF	CHN	Jiang Kun (loan return from Henan Construction)
-	FW	ARG	Hernán Barcos (loan return from Shenzhen Asia Travel)
-	FW	COL	Duvier Riascos (loan from (Colombia) Once Caldas)
-	MF	CHN	Chen Yongqiang (from Shenzhen Asia Travel)
-	MF	CHN	Feng Renliang (from Tianjin Locomotive)
-	MF	CHN	Song Boxuan (from Tianjin Locomotive)
-	MF	CHN	Wang Guanyi (from Tianjin Locomotive)
-	FW	CMR	Jean Michel N'Lend (from (Slovakia) FK Dunajská Streda)
-	DF	BRA	Aderaldo (loan from (Brazil) Paraná)
-	GK	CHN	Dong Lei (from Pudong Zobon)
-	DF	CHN	Qiu Tianyi (from Dalian Yiteng)
-	FW	BRA	Vicente (from Shaanxi Chanba)
-	DF	SYR	Ali Diab (loan from (Syria) Al-Majd)

Out:

No.	Pos.	Nation	Player
3	DF	AUS	Mark Milligan (to (Japan) JEF United Chiba)
11	FW	SVN	Aleksander Rodić (loan return to (Slovenia) Interblock Ljubljana)
43	FW	EST	Andres Oper (to (Netherlands) ADO Den Haag)
-	FW	ARG	Hernán Barcos (to (Ecuador) LDU Quito)
10	FW	CHN	Mao Jianqing (to Shaanxi Chan-Ba)
17	DF	CHN	Sun Ji (to Hangzhou Greentown)
-	MF	CHN	Xiao Zhanbo (to Chengdu Blades)
6	DF	BUL	Yanko Valkanov (to Shenzhen Ruby)
7	FW	BLR	Vyacheslav Hleb (to Shenzhen Ruby)
22	GK	CHN	Zhang Chen (to Pudong Zobon)
18	FW	CHN	Gao Lin (to Guangzhou FC)
5	DF	CHN	Du Wei (to Hangzhou Greentown)

=== Shenzhen Ruby ===
In:

No.	Pos.	Nation	Player
-	MF	CHN	Wang Dong (from Beijing Guoan)
-	MF	CHN	Huang Long (from Hangzhou Greentown)
-	MF	CHN	Quan Heng (from Dalian Shide)
-	MF	CHN	Song Kun (from Dalian Shide)
-	MF	GER	Andy Nägelein (from (Cyprus) APEP Pitsilia)
-	FW	CHN	Li Haoyuan (from (Bosnia and Herzegovina) Zepec BIH)
-	FW	BLR	Vyacheslav Hleb (from Shanghai Shenhua)
-	DF	BUL	Yanko Vâlkanov (from Shanghai Shenhua)
-	FW	BRA	Tiago (from (Brazil) São Caetano)
-	DF	IRQ	Hussein Alaa Hussein (from Qingdao Jonoon)
-	MF	SRB	Aleksandar Živković (Free Agent)

Out:

No.	Pos.	Nation	Player
4	DF	UZB	Aleksey Nikolaev (to (Uzbekistan) FK Samarqand-Dinamo)
5	DF	TOG	Massamasso Tchangai (to (Saudi Arabia) Al-Nassr)
10	MF	CHN	Zheng Bin (loan return to Hubei Greenery)
11	MF	CHN	Liu Chao (loan return to Tianjin Songjiang)
17	FW	SEN	Mouchid Iyane Ly (Released)
20	DF	SRB	Marko Zorić (to Tianjin Teda)
38	DF	CHN	Chen Lei (loan return to Shanghai Shenhua)
41	MF	CHN	Chen Jie (loan return to Shandong Luneng)
44	FW	CHN	Mao Jianqing (loan return to Shanghai Shenhua)
45	FW	ARG	Hernán Barcos (loan return to Shanghai Shenhua)
13	FW	CHN	Zhi Yaqi (to Jiangsu Sainty)

=== Tianjin Teda ===
In:

No.	Pos.	Nation	Player
-	DF	CHN	Li Hongyang (loan return from Chengdu Blades)
-	DF	SRB	Marko Zorić (from Shenzhen Asia Travel)
-	FW	CHN	Jiang Chen (from (Australia) Wellington Phoenix) (loan return)
-	MF	CHN	Li Benjian (loan return from Guangzhou F.C.)
-	GK	CHN	Tian Xu (loan return from Tianjin Songjiang)
-	DF	CHN	Bai Lei (from Guangzhou F.C.)
-	MF	CHN	Bai Guang (from Beijing Hongdeng)
-	MF	CRC	Rodolfo Rodríguez (from (Costa Rica) Brujas FC)
-	FW	CHN	Yu Dabao (from (Portugal) S.L. Benfica)
-	FW	UZB	Farhod Tojiyev (from (Uzbekistan) Pakhtakor Tashkent)
-	FW	NGA	Alfred Emuejeraye (from (Switzerland) FC Wohlen)
-	MF	CHN	Zhang Xiaobin (from Changsha Ginde)

Out:

No.	Pos.	Nation	Player
30	MF	ITA	Damiano Tommasi (to (Italy) Sant'Anna d'Alfaedo)
28	FW	BRA	Éber Luís Cucchi (to Jiangsu Sainty)
23	DF	FRA	Jean-Philippe Caillet (Released)
31	DF	ROU	Alin Chița (Released)
7	MF	CHN	Chi Rongliang (Retired)
8	MF	CHN	Hao Junmin (to (Germany) FC Schalke 04)
34	DF	CHN	Li Hongyang (to Chengdu Blades)
6	DF	CHN	Tan Wangsong (to Henan Construction)
-	GK	CHN	Tian Xu (to Chongqing Lifan)
37	FW	UZB	Zaynitdin Tadjiyev (to (Uzbekistan) Shurtan Guzar)
10	FW	CHN	Zhang Shuo (to (Indonesia) Persik Kediri)
3	DF	CHN	Bai Yi (Retired)

== League One ==
=== Anhui Jiufang ===
In:

No.	Pos.	Nation	Player
-	MF	BRA	Helton (from (Brazil) Esportivo)
-	FW	BRA	Marcinho (from (Brazil) Atlético Sorocaba)
-	MF	BRA	Rodrigo Paulista (from Shenyang Dongjin)
-	MF	CHN	Shen Bo (from Changchun Yatai)
-	FW	CHN	Wang Dawang (from Changchun Yatai)
-	MF	CHN	Huang Ke (from Yunnan Province Football Association)
-	MF	CHN	Huang Lei (from Dalian Yiteng)
-	DF	CHN	Yang Yong (from Wenzhou Tomorrow)
-	FW	CHN	Zhang Xu (from Beijing Guoan)
-	FW	CHN	Ma Xiaolei (from Shenzhen Ruby)
-	DF	CHN	Xiao Jinliang (from Qingdao Hailifeng)
-	DF	BUL	Yordan Varbanov (from Hangzhou Greentown)

Out:

No.	Pos.	Nation	Player
11	MF	BRA	Everton (to Hubei Greenery)
10	FW	BRA	Reinaldo (Released)

=== Beijing Baxy&Shengshi ===
In:

No.	Pos.	Nation	Player
-	GK	CHN	Guo Wei (loan from Dalian Shide)

Out:

No.	Pos.	Nation	Player

=== Beijing Technology ===
In:

No.	Pos.	Nation	Player
-	GK	CHN	Zhang Si (from Guangzhou F.C.)
-	MF	KOR	Lim Jong-Wook (from (South Korea) Daejeon KHNP)
-	DF	NED	Jeroen Nagel (Free Agent)

Out:

No.	Pos.	Nation	Player
14	FW	NED	Ferry de Smalen (Released)
33	DF	NED	Juliano Smit (Released)
17	MF	CHN	Zhang Shu (Retired)

=== Chengdu Blades ===
In:

No.	Pos.	Nation	Player
-	DF	CHN	Li Hongyang (from Tianjin Teda)
-	MF	CHN	Xiao Zhanbo (from Shanghai Shenhua)
-	GK	CHN	Song Zhenyu (from Changsha Ginde)
-	FW	ANG	Johnson Macaba (loan from (Brazil) Goiás)
-	FW	CHN	Hui Jiakang (from (Hungary) Ferencvárosi TC)
-	FW	CHN	Lei Yongchi (from (Hungary) Ferencvárosi TC)
-	DF	BRA	Tiago Prado (from (Brazil) Pelotas)
-	MF	BRA	Harison (from (Brazil) Sertãozinho)

Out:

No.	Pos.	Nation	Player
27	DF	CHN	Sun Jihai (to Shaanxi Chan-Ba)
33	FW	CHN	Wang Song (to Hangzhou Greentown)
43	DF	CHN	Li Hongyang (loan return to Tianjin Teda)
2	DF	CHN	Liu Cheng (to Changsha Ginde)
8	MF	SUI	Oumar Kondé (loan return to (Switzerland) FC Zürich)
10	FW	BRA	Auricélio Neres Rodrigues (to Hubei Greenery)
7	MF	CHN	Zhao Mingxin (to Hunan Billows)
34	FW	BRA	Agnaldo (to Shenyang Dongjin)
44	DF	JAM	Demar Stewart (Released)
-	MF	CHN	Wu Bo (loan to Tianjin Songjiang)
-	DF	CHN	Yu Rui (loan to Tianjin Songjiang)

=== Guangdong Sunray Cave ===
In:

No.	Pos.	Nation	Player
6	DF	BRA	Luiz Henrique (from (Brazil) Londrina EC)
9	FW	BRA	Giovane da Silva (from (Brazil) Atlético de Ibirama)
8	MF	CHN	Chen Xu (from (Macau) Kuan Tai)
20	FW	CHN	Wei Huiping (from (Macau) Windsor Arch)
25	MF	CHN	Liu Xi (from Hubei Orient)

Out:

No.	Pos.	Nation	Player
31	MF	SRB	Momir Desnica (loan return to FK Banat Zrenjanin)
33	FW	CMR	Guy Madjo (released)
3	DF	CHN	Guo Zichao (loan return to Guangzhou GAC)
4	DF	CHN	Chen Jianlong (loan return to Guangzhou GAC)
7	DF	CHN	Xu Weilong (loan return to Guangzhou GAC)
20	MF	CHN	Peng Shaoxiong (loan return to Guangzhou GAC)
27	FW	CHN	Li Jiaqi (loan return to Guangzhou GAC)
30	FW	CHN	Zhu Pengfei (loan return to Guangzhou GAC)
6	MF	CHN	Hu Ziye (released)
8	MF	CHN	Zeng Qixiang (released)
9	FW	CHN	Zeng Liang (released)
25	MF	CHN	Deng Zhigang (released)
26	MF	CHN	Cao Tianfu (released)
32	GK	CHN	Liang Chaoyue (released)

=== Guangzhou GAC ===
In:

No.	Pos.	Nation	Player
4	DF	AUS	John Tambouras (from (Australia) North Queensland Fury)
8	FW	BRA	Eduardo Delani (from (Denmark) Vejle Boldklub)
9	FW	CAN	Charles Gbeke (from (Canada) Vancouver Whitecaps)
10	MF	NGA	Gabriel Melkam (from Changchun Yatai)
29	FW	CHN	Gao Lin (from Shanghai Shenhua)
6	MF	CHN	Hu Zhaojun (loan extended from Dalian Shide)
15	MF	CHN	Xu Weilong (loan return from Guangdong Sunray Cave)
18	DF	CHN	Chen Jianlong (loan return from Guangdong Sunray Cave)
21	MF	CHN	Peng Shaoxiong (loan return from Guangdong Sunray Cave)
25	DF	CHN	Guo Zichao (loan return from Guangdong Sunray Cave)
—	FW	CHN	Li Jiaqi (loan return from Guangdong Sunray Cave)
—	FW	CHN	Zhu Pengfei (loan return from Guangdong Sunray Cave)

Out:

No.	Pos.	Nation	Player
5	DF	PER	Ismael Alvarado (to (Peru) CD Universidad César Vallejo)
8	MF	BRA	Diogo Barcelos (to (Brazil) SER Caxias do Sul)
10	FW	BRA	Diego Barcelos (to (Portugal) CD Nacional da Madeira)
9	FW	HON	Luis Alfredo Ramírez (to Hangzhou Greentown)
12	GK	CHN	Zhang Si (to Beijing BIT)
20	MF	CHN	Xu Liang (to Beijing Guoan)
28	DF	CHN	Bai Lei (to Tianjin Teda)
11	MF	CHN	Li Benjian (loan return to Tianjin Teda)
29	DF	CHN	Cui Wei (loan return to Changchun Yatai)
14	MF	CHN	Cao Zhijie (released)

=== Hunan Billows ===
In:

No.	Pos.	Nation	Player
-	MF	CHN	Dai Qinhua (from Changsha Ginde)
-	DF	CHN	Liu Bo (from Hangzhou Greentown)
-	MF	CHN	Zhao Mingxin (from Chengdu Blades)
-	DF	HON	Mario Beata (from (Honduras) Marathón)
-	FW	HON	Mitchel Brown (from (Honduras) Marathón)
-	DF	BRA	Neto (from Beijing Hongdeng)
-	GK	CHN	Dong Jianhong (from Shenyang Dongjin)

Out:

No.	Pos.	Nation	Player
9	FW	CHN	Akram (Retired)
2	MF	CHN	Ding Yehua (to Pudong Zobon)

=== Hubei Luyin ===
In:

No.	Pos.	Nation	Player
-	MF	CHN	Ao Feifan (from Shanghai East Asia)
-	DF	CHN	Liu Jie (from Hubei CTGU Kangtian)
-	MF	CHN	Zhou Heng (from Chongqing Lifan) (loan return)
-	MF	CHN	Wu Peng (loan return from Chongqing Lifan)
-	MF	CHN	Rong Hao (loan return from Jiangsu Sainty)
-	MF	CHN	Yao Hanlin (loan return from Jiangsu Sainty)
-	MF	CHN	Deng Zhuoxiang (loan return from Jiangsu Sainty)
-	MF	CHN	Zheng Bin (loan return from Shenzhen Asia Travel)
-	FW	BRA	Auricélio Neres Rodrigues (from Chengdu Blades)
-	MF	BRA	Everton (from Anhui Jiufang)
-	DF	CHN	Wang Sheng (loan return from Dalian Shide)
-	FW	CHN	Hu Peilong (from Hubei CTGU Kangtian)
-	MF	CHN	Rao Yao (from Tianjin Songjiang)

Out:

No.	Pos.	Nation	Player
-	MF	CHN	Zhou Heng (to Chongqing Lifan)
-	MF	CHN	Wu Peng (to Chongqing Lifan)
-	DF	CHN	Zheng Kaimu (to Shanghai East Asia)
-	MF	CHN	Deng Zhuoxiang (to Shandong Luneng)
-	MF	CHN	Rong Hao (to Hangzhou Greentown)

=== Nanjing Yoyo ===
In:

No.	Pos.	Nation	Player
-	MF	CHN	Yang Zheng (from Hangzhou Greentown)
-	MF	SRB	Dragan Stančić (from Qingdao Jonoon)
-	DF	CHN	Han Chao (from Shanghai East Asia)

Out:

No.	Pos.	Nation	Player
25	DF	CHN	Xiong Fei (to Shanghai Shenhua)
10	FW	CHN	Li Weiliang (Retired)

=== Shanghai Zobon ===
In:

No.	Pos.	Nation	Player
-	MF	CHN	Zhang Mengqi (from Shanghai East Asia)
-	DF	CHN	Han Guanghua (from Yanbian FC)
-	MF	CHN	Ding Yehua (from Hunan Billows)
-	MF	CHN	Huang Jie (from Changchun Yatai)
-	MF	CHN	Zhang Hongkun (from Qingdao Hailifeng)
-	GK	CHN	Zhang Chen (from Shanghai Shenhua)
-	FW	BRA	Leonardo (from Shenyang Dongjin)
-	FW	CRO	Darko Cordas (Free Agent)

Out:

No.	Pos.	Nation	Player
4	DF	CHN	Di You (to Jiangsu Sainty)
22	GK	CHN	Dong Lei (to Shanghai Shenhua)
9	MF	BRA	Pilo (Released)
10	FW	CMR	Didier Njewel (Released)
29	FW	BRA	Fabiano (Released)
30	DF	CHN	Li Yi'nan (to Chongqing Lifan)

=== Shanghai East Asia ===
In:

No.	Pos.	Nation	Player
-	DF	CHN	Zheng Kaimu (from Hubei Greenery)
-	MF	CHN	Li Cheng (from Ningbo Huaao)
-	DF	CHN	Eddy François (from Ningbo Huaao)
-	MF	CHN	Wang Jiajie (from Ningbo Huaao)
-	FW	HAI	Fabrice Noël (from Puerto Rico Islanders)
-	DF	MKD	Nikola Karčev (from (North Macedonia) FK Vardar)
-	MF	CRO	Kosta Bjedov (from (Serbia) FK Radnicki Obrenovac)

Out:

No.	Pos.	Nation	Player
3	DF	CHN	Zhang Zhi (to Guizhou Zhicheng)
9	MF	CHN	Ao Feifan (to Hubei Greenery)
14	DF	CHN	Lin Yincheng (to Nanchang Bayi)
15	MF	CHN	Zhang Mengqi (to Pudong Zobon)
21	DF	CHN	Han Chao (to Nanjing Yoyo)

=== Shenyang Dongjin ===
In:

No.	Pos.	Nation	Player
-	FW	BRA	Anderson Luiz (from Liaoning Whowin)
-	DF	CAN	Rumbani Munthali (from Nanchang Hengyuan)
-	FW	BRA	Agnaldo (from Chengdu Blades)
-	FW	NGA	Philip Edeipo (from Qingdao Hailifeng)
-	DF	CHN	Feng Shaoshun (from Qingdao Hailifeng)

Out:

No.	Pos.	Nation	Player
19	DF	CHN	Zhang Ke (to Jiangsu Sainty)
33	MF	BRA	Rodrigo Paulista (to Anhui Jiufang)
10	FW	BRA	Leonardo (to Pudong Zobon)
23	DF	BRA	Paulo César (Released)
32	FW	PRK	Jon Song-Rim (Released)
22	FW	CHN	Zou Jie (loan return to Dalian Shide)
-	GK	CHN	Dong Jianhong (to Hunan Billows)

=== Yanbian ===
In:

No.	Pos.	Nation	Player
-	DF	CMR	Clément Lebe (Free Agent)
-	FW	RWA	Jean-Paul Eale Lutula (loan from (Belgium) FC Brussels)

Out:

No.	Pos.	Nation	Player
17	MF	NGA	Abdulafees Abdulsalam (Released)
38	MF	BRA	Ricardinho (Released)
39	FW	BRA	Emanuel (Released)
