= List of Chinese football transfers summer 2011 =

This is a list of Chinese football transfers for the 2011 season summer transfer window. Only moves from Super League and League One are listed.

== Super League ==
=== Beijing Guoan ===
In: Note: Flags indicate national team as defined under FIFA eligibility rules; some limited exceptions apply. Players may hold more than one non-FIFA nationality.

No.	Pos.	Nation	Player
40	DF	SEN	Adama François Sene (from (Portugal) Vitória F.C.)
41	FW	SEN	Ladji Keita (loan from (Portugal) S.C. Braga)

Out: Note: Flags indicate national team as defined under FIFA eligibility rules; some limited exceptions apply. Players may hold more than one non-FIFA nationality.

No.	Pos.	Nation	Player
2	DF	CHN	Lang Zheng (loan to Nanchang Hengyuan)
8	FW	BRA	Roberto (to (Portugal) Gil Vicente F.C.)
10	FW	BRA	Davi (loan return to (Qatar) Umm Salal)
11	FW	CHN	Yan Xiangchuang (loan to Dalian Shide)
32	MF	CHN	Cui Yu (loan to Qingdao QUST)
33	DF	CHN	Ma Chongchong (loan to Sichuan FC)

=== Changchun Yatai ===
In:

No.	Pos.	Nation	Player
3	MF	CMR	Modeste M'bami (loan from Dalian Aerbin)
14	FW	COL	Yovanny Arrechea (from (Colombia) Atlético Nacional)

Out:

No.	Pos.	Nation	Player
5	MF	SRB	Radomir Koković (loan return to (Serbia) FK Rad)
31	MF	CHN	Hu Xi (loan to Hubei Wuhan Zhongbo)
37	FW	CHN	Pan Chaoran (loan to Nanchang Hengyuan)

=== Chengdu Blades ===
In:

No.	Pos.	Nation	Player
13	DF	CHN	Gan Yingbo (Free Agent)
20	FW	COL	Romero (Free Agent)
38	MF	MLT	John Hutchinson (loan from (Australia) Central Coast Mariners)
40	MF	CHN	Rixat Omarjan (Free Agent)

Out:

No.	Pos.	Nation	Player
3	DF	CHN	Liu Yu (to Jiangsu Sainty)
9	FW	CHN	Shi Jun (to Sichuan FC)
19	FW	AUS	Adam Kwasnik (loan return to (Australia) Central Coast Mariners)
29	GK	CHN	Song Zhenyu (to Tianjin Teda)
-	MF	CHN	Jiang Sheng (loan to Hubei Wuhan Zhongbo)

=== Dalian Shide ===
In:

No.	Pos.	Nation	Player
41	FW	CHN	Yan Xiangchuang (loan from Beijing Guoan)
42	DF	UZB	Murod Kholmukhamedov (loan from (Uzbekistan) Pakhtakor Tashkent)
43	FW	BRA	Adriano (from (Brazil) Fluminense)

Out:

No.	Pos.	Nation	Player
16	MF	KOR	Jeon Kwang-Jin (Released)
20	DF	KOR	Kim Jin-Kyu (to (Japan) Ventforet Kofu)

=== Guangzhou Evergrande ===
In:

No.	Pos.	Nation	Player
15	MF	ARG	Darío Conca (from (Brazil) Fluminense Football Club)

Out:

No.	Pos.	Nation	Player
8	MF	BRA	Renato Cajá (loan to (Brazil) Ponte Preta)

=== Hangzhou Greentown ===
In:

No.	Pos.	Nation	Player
41	FW	HON	Randy Diamond (loan from (Honduras) Marathón)
42	FW	CHN	Mao Jianqing (loan from Shaanxi Baorong Chanba)

Out:

No.	Pos.	Nation	Player
8	MF	CHN	Li Yan (Retired)
10	FW	URU	Matías Masiero (loan return to (Chile) Unión Española)
22	GK	CHN	Teng Shangkun (loan to Shenzhen Phoenix)

=== Henan Construction ===
In:

No.	Pos.	Nation	Player
37	FW	ZAM	Christopher Katongo (from (Greece) Skoda Xanthi)
40	MF	ARG	Marcos Flores (from (Australia) Adelaide United FC)
42	DF	CHN	Han Chao (Free Agent)
48	FW	CHN	Bi Jinhao (from (Portugal) Boavista F.C.)

Out:

No.	Pos.	Nation	Player
8	MF	BRA	Thiago Potiguar (loan return to (Brazil) Paysandu)
22	MF	BRA	Rômulo (Released)

=== Jiangsu Sainty ===
In:

No.	Pos.	Nation	Player
37	DF	CHN	Liu Yu (from Chengdu Blades)
38	FW	SRB	Aleksandar Jevtić (from (Serbia) Red Star Belgrade)
39	DF	UZB	Kamoliddin Tadjiev (from (Uzbekistan) Pakhtakor Tashkent)
40	GK	CHN	Lu Zheyu (loan from Tianjin Teda)

Out:

No.	Pos.	Nation	Player
4	DF	AUS	Alex Wilkinson (loan return to (Australia) Central Coast Mariners)
6	MF	CHN	Guo Mingyue (to Chongqing F.C.)
19	FW	AUS	Bruce Djite (loan return to (Australia) Adelaide United FC)
29	MF	CHN	Liu Ji (loan to Guizhou Zhicheng)

=== Liaoning Whowin ===
In:

No.	Pos.	Nation	Player
2	DF	CHN	Li Yi'nan (from Chongqing Lifan)
38	FW	CMR	Jean Michel N'Lend (Free Agent)

Out:

No.	Pos.	Nation	Player

=== Nanchang Hengyuan ===
In:

No.	Pos.	Nation	Player
4	DF	CHN	Lang Zheng (loan from Beijing Guoan)
9	FW	BRA	di Carmo (loan from (Brazil) Ituiutaba)
12	MF	BRA	Camilo (loan from (Brazil) Cruzeiro)
47	FW	BRA	Paulo Roberto (loan from (Brazil) Bragantino)
48	DF	CHN	Wang Jian (loan from Tianjin Teda)
49	FW	CHN	Pan Chaoran (loan from Changchun Yatai)
-	MF	BOL	Jhasmani Campos (from (Bolivia) Oriente Petrolero)

Out:

No.	Pos.	Nation	Player
10	FW	URU	Jonathan Ramis (loan return to (Uruguay) Peñarol)
19	FW	CHN	Ji Jun (Released)
23	FW	URU	Diego Vera (loan return to (Uruguay) Liverpool Montevideo)
35	MF	CHN	Ye Zhanggen (to Qingdao QUST)
38	MF	CHN	Shen Jiahao (Released)
40	GK	CHN	Cheng Xiaopeng (Released)
-	MF	BOL	Jhasmani Campos (loan to (Bolivia) Club Bolívar)

=== Qingdao Jonoon ===
In:

No.	Pos.	Nation	Player
6	FW	UZB	Aziz Ibrahimov (from (Czech Republic) Bohemians 1905)

Out:

No.	Pos.	Nation	Player
11	MF	UZB	Ildar Magdeev (Released)

=== Shaanxi Baorong Chanba ===
In:

No.	Pos.	Nation	Player
11	FW	SCO	Derek Riordan (from (Scotland) Hibernian F.C.)
29	MF	CHN	Zhang Ke (Free Agent)

Out:

No.	Pos.	Nation	Player
9	FW	SVK	Tomáš Oravec (loan return to (Slovakia) MŠK Žilina)
33	FW	CHN	Mao Jianqing (loan to Hangzhou Greentown)

=== Shandong Luneng ===
In:

No.	Pos.	Nation	Player
4	DF	BRA	Fabiano (from (Italy) U.S. Lecce)
50	MF	CHN	Hao Junmin (from (Germany) FC Schalke 04)
-	FW	CHN	Wang Gang (from (Portugal) S.C. Beira-Mar)

Out:

No.	Pos.	Nation	Player
3	DF	BRA	Renato Silva (loan to (Brazil) CR Vasco da Gama)
-	FW	CHN	Wang Gang (loan to (Portugal) S.C. Covilhã)

=== Shanghai Shenhua ===
In:

No.	Pos.	Nation	Player
38	MF	COL	Eisner Iván Loboa (loan from (Colombia) Deportivo Pasto)
39	FW	CHN	You Yuanwen (Free Agent)

Out:

No.	Pos.	Nation	Player
8	FW	COL	Duvier Riascos (Released)
19	FW	CHN	Dong Xuesheng (loan to Shenzhen Ruby)
24	MF	CHN	Wang Yang (loan to (Lithuania) FK Sūduva)
31	DF	SYR	Abdulkader Dakka (loan return to (Syria) Al-Ittihad)
32	MF	CHN	Gu Bin (loan to (Lithuania) FK Sūduva)
36	MF	CHN	Zheng Wei (to Chongqing F.C.)
-	DF	CHN	Fan Qunxiao (to (Hong Kong) TSW Pegasus)

=== Shenzhen Ruby ===
In:

No.	Pos.	Nation	Player
39	FW	HON	Rony Flores (loan from (Honduras) Marathón)
40	FW	CHN	Dong Xuesheng (loan from Shanghai Shenhua)
41	DF	CHN	Yi Teng (from (France) FC Metz)
42	DF	BOL	Ronald Rivero (loan from (Bolivia) Club Bolívar)

Out:

No.	Pos.	Nation	Player
10	MF	SVN	Ermin Rakovič (Released)
18	FW	JPN	Seiichiro Maki (to (Japan) Tokyo Verdy)
25	MF	CHN	Li Xin (Released)
29	DF	CHN	Xing Kai (Released)
-	FW	CHN	Xu Yihai (to Dalian Aerbin)

=== Tianjin Teda ===
In:

No.	Pos.	Nation	Player
42	FW	ROU	Marius Bilaşco (from (Romania) FC Steaua București)
44	MF	KOR	Song Chong-Gug (from (South Korea) Ulsan Hyundai)
45	GK	CHN	Song Zhenyu (from Chengdu Blades)

Out:

No.	Pos.	Nation	Player
3	MF	KOR	Kwon Jip (Released)
9	FW	NGA	Obiora Odita (to (Serbia) Javor Ivanjica)
17	GK	CHN	Lu Zheyu (loan to Jiangsu Sainty)
24	FW	CHN	Du Junpeng (Released)
41	FW	CHN	Fan Zhiqiang (loan to Beijing Technology)
-	DF	CHN	Wang Jian (loan to Nanchang Hengyuan)

== League One ==
=== Beijing Baxy ===
In:

No.	Pos.	Nation	Player
25	DF	URU	Máximo Lucas (Free Agent)
34	FW	URU	Diego Seoane (from (El Salvador) C.D. Águila)

Out:

No.	Pos.	Nation	Player
10	MF	CHN	Wang Jun (to Dalian Aerbin)
30	FW	USA	Lyle Martin (Released)

=== Beijing Technology ===
In:

No.	Pos.	Nation	Player
36	DF	URU	Martín Rodríguez (from (Uruguay) Liverpool F.C.)
39	FW	CHN	Li Xun (from Yanbian Changbai Tiger)

Out:

No.	Pos.	Nation	Player

=== Chongqing Lifan ===
In:

No.	Pos.	Nation	Player
33	FW	ANG	Johnson Macaba (from Shenzhen Phoenix)

Out:

No.	Pos.	Nation	Player
4	DF	CHN	Li Yi'nan (to Liaoning Whowin)
8	MF	BRA	Raí (Released)

=== Dalian Aerbin ===
In:

No.	Pos.	Nation	Player
26	FW	COL	Luis Carlos Cabezas (from (Venezuela) Caracas FC)
31	FW	CHN	Xu Yihai (from Shenzhen Ruby)
39	MF	CHN	Wang Jun (from Beijing Baxy)
-	MF	CMR	Modeste M'bami (from (Spain) UD Almería)

Out:

No.	Pos.	Nation	Player
8	FW	COL	Edison Chará (Released)
-	MF	CMR	Modeste M'bami (loan to Changchun Yatai)

=== Guangdong Sunray Cave ===
In:

No.	Pos.	Nation	Player
33	DF	MLI	Mourtala Diakité (Free Agent)

Out:

No.	Pos.	Nation	Player
5	DF	CRC	Darío Delgado (loan return to (Costa Rica) Puntarenas F.C.)
9	FW	BRA	Ronny (to (Romania) CFR Cluj)
10	MF	CHN	Pan Jia (loan to (Hong Kong) Sun Hei SC)
22	GK	CHN	Hou Yu (loan to (Hong Kong) Sun Hei SC)

=== Guizhou Zhicheng ===
In:

No.	Pos.	Nation	Player
9	MF	NGA	Obi Moneke (Free Agent)
17	MF	CHN	Liu Ji (loan from Jiangsu Sainty)

Out:

No.	Pos.	Nation	Player

=== Hunan Billows ===
In:

No.	Pos.	Nation	Player

Out:

No.	Pos.	Nation	Player

=== Hubei Wuhan Zhongbo ===
In:

No.	Pos.	Nation	Player
4	MF	CHN	Hu Xi (loan from Changchun Yatai)
38	MF	CHN	Jiang Sheng (loan from Chengdu Blades)

Out:

No.	Pos.	Nation	Player
22	GK	CHN	Ding Runshan (loan to Hubei Youth)
25	MF	CHN	Wang Kang (loan to Hubei CTGU Kangtian)

=== Shanghai East Asia ===
In:

No.	Pos.	Nation	Player
35	FW	CHN	Xu Bin (Free Agent)

Out:

No.	Pos.	Nation	Player
14	FW	BRA	Cílio Souza (Released)
17	FW	BIH	Jusuf Dajić (to (Hungary) Vasas SC)
19	DF	MKD	Nikola Karčev (to (North Macedonia) FK Vardar)

=== Shenyang Dongjin ===
In:

No.	Pos.	Nation	Player
3	DF	KOR	Lee Yoon-Sub (Free Agent)
7	MF	CHN	Mou Yongjie (from (Indonesia) Sriwijaya F.C.)
35	MF	CHN	Liang Yuchi (Free Agent)

Out:

No.	Pos.	Nation	Player
12	DF	KOR	Sung Jong-Hyun (Released)
33	DF	SRB	Milan Martinović (Released)

=== Shenzhen Phoenix ===
In:

No.	Pos.	Nation	Player
18	FW	ENG	Marlon Harewood (from (England) Blackpool F.C.)
30	GK	CHN	Teng Shangkun (loan from Hangzhou Greentown)

Out:

No.	Pos.	Nation	Player
11	FW	ANG	Johnson Macaba (to Chongqing Lifan)
25	FW	BRA	Beto (Released)

=== Tianjin Runyulong ===
In:

No.	Pos.	Nation	Player
-	MF	CHN	Ma Xiaolei (loan return from (Lithuania) FK Sūduva)

Out:

No.	Pos.	Nation	Player
-	MF	CHN	Ma Xiaolei (to Chongqing F.C.)

=== Tianjin Songjiang ===
In:

No.	Pos.	Nation	Player
32	DF	CHN	Zhang Jian (Free Agent)

Out:

No.	Pos.	Nation	Player

=== Yanbian Changbai Tiger ===
In:

No.	Pos.	Nation	Player
33	MF	MLI	Soumaila Coulibaly (Free Agent)

Out:

No.	Pos.	Nation	Player
20	FW	CHN	Li Xun (to Beijing Technology)
31	FW	KOR	Lee Kwang-Jae (to (Thailand) TTM Phichit F.C.)
