= Zhou Heng =

Zhou Heng may refer to:

- Zhou Heng (footballer)
- Zhou Heng (physicist)
