= Zhang Lie =

Chinese footballer

Zhang Lie 张烈
Personal information
- Full name: Zhang Lie
- Date of birth: 25 May 1982 (age 44)
- Place of birth: Shenyang, Liaoning, China
- Height: 1.88 m (6 ft 2 in)
- Position: Goalkeeper

Senior career*
Years	Team	Apps	(Gls)
2000–2006	Shenyang Haishi	46	(0)
2008–2010	Shenyang Dongjin	44	(0)
2011–2021	Beijing Renhe	259	(1)

International career^{‡}
2011	China	2	(0)
- * Club domestic league appearances and goals as of 14 October 2020 ‡ National team caps and goals as of 2 November 2014

Zhang Lie (simplified Chinese: 张烈; traditional Chinese: 張烈; pinyin: Zhāng Liè; born 25 May 1982) is a retired Chinese footballer.

== Club career ==
Zhang Lie would start his football career playing for his local top-tier football team Shenyang Haishi in the 2000 league season and would eventually establish himself as the team's first choice goalkeeper by the club's manager Zhang Guangying at the beginning of the 2004 season, where he would go on to play in twenty-two league games throughout the campaign. After a campaign that saw Shenyang underperformed at the end of the season, the club would bring in a new manager in Martin Koopman who decided that he wanted to bring in Guo Chunquan and Wang Lüe into the team, which saw Zhang dropped to third choice goalkeeper throughout the 2005 season. The beginning of the 2006 season saw the club bring in a new goalkeeper Song Zhenyu to add even more competition within a goal and Zhang would have to prove himself to Koopman, however while he was given the first game of the season, Song would quickly be promoted to first choice. Zhang spent most of the season as second choice throughout the campaign.

In 2007, Zhang was allowed to leave Shenyang, however he struggled to find a new club to play for and would retire from playing to take up a job with Liaoning Guangyuan as a goalkeeping coach. After a year out, Zhang was given a chance to revitalize his career with third-tier club Shenyang Dongjin who he saw win the division title and promotion to the second tier. The following season would see Zhang not only help establish Shenyang Dongjin within the league, but his impressive performances saw him guide the club to third and just miss out on a double promotion to the top tier. Zhang would go on to draw the attentions of top-tier side Shaanxi Renhe who were interested in his services at the beginning of the 2011 season after they found out that his contract coming to an end, however Shenyang Dongjin believed that Zhang had agreed upon a contract extension and was only up for sale at 2,000,000 yuan. The case would be heard by the Chinese Football Association who ruled that Zhang did not sign a contract extension and was free to join Shaanxi Renhe. The club was later relocated and was renamed Guizhou Renhe. He appeared in every minute of the 2012 league season, playing in all 30 Super League games for Guizhou Renhe, as the club achieved fourth place in the league and runners-up in the FA Cup and gained the entry into AFC Champions League for the first time.

== International career ==
While playing in the 2004 league season for Shenyang Haishi he would be called up to the China national team for the first time for several training sessions under head coach Arie Haan, however, it wasn't until 2011 when Zhang joined Guizhou Renhe did he show maturity in goal and was called up to the national team again. After six years out of the international scene, then manager Gao Hongbo would not only call him up for a friendly but try Zhang out in a game against North Korea on 8 June 2011 in a 2-0 victory.

== Career statistics ==
Statistics accurate as of match played 14 October 2020.

Appearances and goals by club, season and competition
Club	Season	League			National Cup		League Cup		Continental		Other		Total	
Club	Season	Division	Apps	Goals	Apps	Goals	Apps	Goals	Apps	Goals	Apps	Goals	Apps	Goals
Shenyang Ginde	2000	Jia-A League / CSL	1	0		0	-		-		-		1	0
Shenyang Ginde	2001	Jia-A League / CSL	17	0		0	-		-		-		17	0
Shenyang Ginde	2002	Jia-A League / CSL	4	0		0	-		-		-		4	0
Shenyang Ginde	2003	Jia-A League / CSL	0	0		0	-		-		-		0	0
Shenyang Ginde	2004	Jia-A League / CSL	22	0	4	0		0	-		-		26	0
Shenyang Ginde	2005	Jia-A League / CSL	0	0	0	0		0	-		-		0	0
Shenyang Ginde	2006	Jia-A League / CSL	2	0	0	0	-		-		-		2	0
Shenyang Ginde	Total		46	0	4	0	0	0	0	0	0	0	50	0
Shenyang Dongjin	2008	China League Two	?	0	-		-		-		-		?	0
Shenyang Dongjin	2009	China League One	24	0	-		-		-		-		24	0
Shenyang Dongjin	2010	China League One	20	0	-		-		-		-		20	0
Shenyang Dongjin	Total		44	0	0	0	0	0	0	0	0	0	44	0
Shaanxi Renhe / Guizhou Renhe / Beijing Renhe	2011	Chinese Super League	29	0	1	0	-		-		-		30	0
Shaanxi Renhe / Guizhou Renhe / Beijing Renhe	2012	Chinese Super League	30	0	5	0	-		-		-		35	0
Shaanxi Renhe / Guizhou Renhe / Beijing Renhe	2013	Chinese Super League	29	0	5	0	-		6	0	-		40	0
Shaanxi Renhe / Guizhou Renhe / Beijing Renhe	2014	Chinese Super League	29	0	2	0	-		5	0	1 (Note: Appearances in Chinese FA Super Cup)	0	37	0
Shaanxi Renhe / Guizhou Renhe / Beijing Renhe	2015	Chinese Super League	27	0	2	0	-		-		-		29	0
Shaanxi Renhe / Guizhou Renhe / Beijing Renhe	2016	China League One	30	1	0	0	-		-		-		30	1
Shaanxi Renhe / Guizhou Renhe / Beijing Renhe	2017	China League One	28	0	0	0	-		-		-		28	0
Shaanxi Renhe / Guizhou Renhe / Beijing Renhe	2018	Chinese Super League	29	0	1	0	-		-		-		30	0
Shaanxi Renhe / Guizhou Renhe / Beijing Renhe	2019	Chinese Super League	19	0	0	0	-		-		-		19	0
Shaanxi Renhe / Guizhou Renhe / Beijing Renhe	2020	China League One	9	0	0	0	-		-		-		9	0
Shaanxi Renhe / Guizhou Renhe / Beijing Renhe	Total		259	1	16	0	0	0	11	0	1	0	287	1
Career total			348	1	20	0	0	0	11	0	1	0	380	1

== Honours ==
=== Club ===
Shenyang Dongjin

- China League Two: 2008

Guizhou Renhe

- Chinese FA Cup: 2013
- Chinese FA Super Cup: 2014

Sporting positions
Preceded by Li Yinan	Shenyang Ginde captain (Caretaker); 2004	Succeeded by Wang Qiang
