= Shi Xiaotian =

Chinese footballer

Shi Xiaotian 石笑天
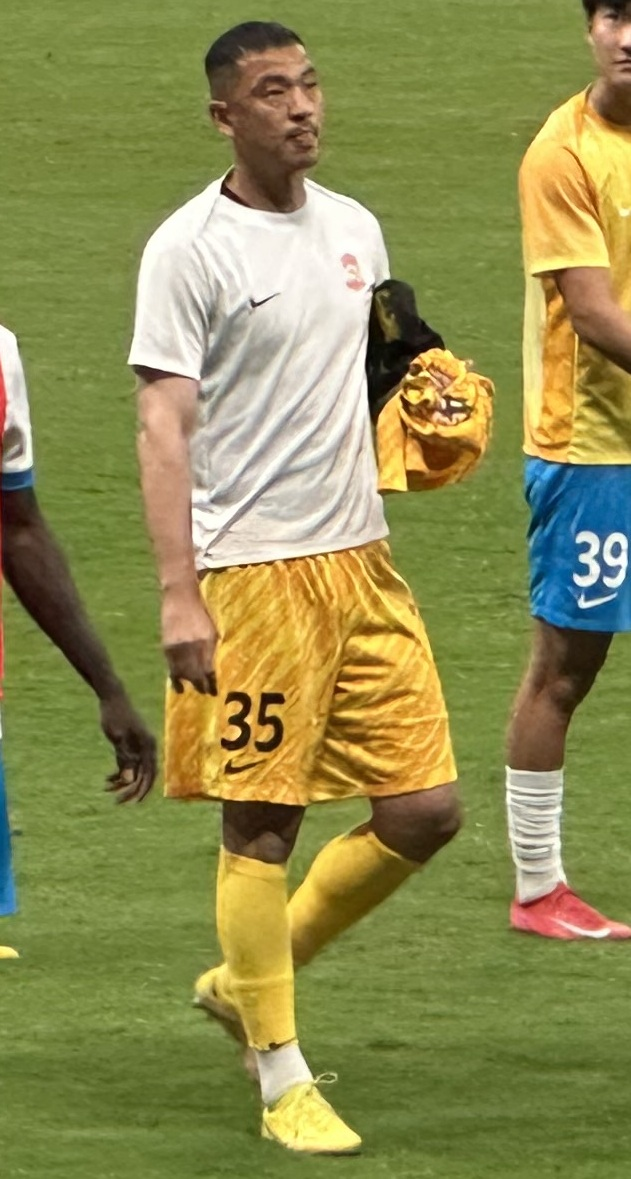
- Shi Xiaotian in June 2025

Personal information
- Date of birth: 6 March 1990 (age 36)
- Place of birth: Shenyang, Liaoning, China
- Height: 1.90 m (6 ft 3 in)
- Position: Goalkeeper

Team information
- Current team: Foshan Nanshi
- Number: 36

Youth career
- Shenyang Ginde

Senior career*
| Years | Team | Apps | (Gls) |
| 2007–2014 | Guangzhou R&F | 39 | (0) |
| 2014–2019 | Liaoning Whowin | 55 | (0) |
| 2015 | → Beijing Guoan (loan) | 0 | (0) |
| 2019–2021 | Changchun Yatai | 60 | (0) |
| 2022 | Chongqing Liangjiang | 0 | (0) |
| 2022–2023 | Henan FC | 4 | (0) |
| 2023–2024 | Jiangxi Lushan | 12 | (0) |
| 2024–2025 | Qingdao West Coast | 13 | (0) |
| 2025 | Liaoning Tieren | 1 | (0) |
| 2026– | Foshan Nanshi | 0 | (0) |

International career^{‡}
| 2017 | China | 1 | (0) |
Medal record
Representing China
Men's football
EAFF Championship
| Bronze medal – third place | 2017 Japan | Team |
- * Club domestic league appearances and goals as of 11 March 2026 ‡ National team caps and goals as of 14 January 2017

Shi Xiaotian
- Chinese: 石笑天
Transcriptions
Standard Mandarin
- Hanyu Pinyin: Shí Xiàotiān
- IPA: [ʂɻ̩̌ ɕjâʊ tʰjɛ́n]

Shi Xiaotian (Chinese: 石笑天; pinyin: Shí Xiàotiān; born 6 March 1990) is a Chinese professional footballer who plays as a goalkeeper for China League One club Foshan Nanshi.

== Club career ==
Shi joined the Changsha Ginde youth team system in the early years and was promoted to the first team squad in 2007. He became the second choice goalkeeper of the club and acted as back-up for China national team goalkeeper Song Zhenyu in 2008. On 3 May, he made his senior debut after Song was injured in training, in a 1–1 away draw against Qingdao Jonoon. He had another chance to play for Changsha and made 6 appearances in the 2008 league season. After Song transferred to Chengdu Blades, Shi played as the back-up for newcomer Zhang Lei in 2010. Changsha Ginde finished at the bottom of the league and was relegated to China League One. In February 2011, the club moved to Shenzhen and changed its name to Shenzhen Phoenix. Shi failed to move to his hometown club, Shenyang Dongjin, and finally chose to stay with the club. He became the regular starter at the beginning of the season; however, he lost his position to Wang Lüe after June. The club was bought by Chinese property developers Guangzhou R&F in the middle of the season, moved to Guangzhou and won promotion back to the Super League at the first attempt. Shi made 16 appearances in the 2011 league season.

On 7 February 2014, Shi transferred to Chinese Super League side Liaoning Whowin. On 9 February 2015, he was loaned to Super League club Beijing Guoan. Shi returned to Liaoning in the 2016 season and became the first choice goalkeeper of the club after Zhang Lu left for Tianjin Quanjian.

In February 2019, Shi transferred to the newly relegated China League One side Changchun Yatai. He was ever-present in all 45 league games over the first 2 seasons, helping Yatai win the 2020 China League One and achieve promotion to the Chinese Super League.

During the 2022 winter transfer window, Shi experienced a dramatic transfer saga which saw him join 3 clubs. He first joined Shanghai Shenhua alongside former Shandong Taishan defender Li Songyi in April 2022; however, Shenhua received a transfer ban afterwards before their registration procedures could be completed. He subsequently joined Chongqing Liangjiang Athletic on 29 April 2022, and was included in their squad for the 2022 Chinese Super League season. However, on 24 May 2022, 10 days before the new season began, Chongqing announced its disbandment and exit from the Chinese Super League due to financial difficulties. Shi eventually joined Henan Songshan Longmen (later renamed as Henan FC) on 27 May 2022, and made his debut for the club on 20 June 2022 in a 0-0 draw against his former club Changchun Yatai.

== International career ==
On 14 January 2017, Shi made his debut for the Chinese national team in the third-place playoff of the 2017 China Cup against Croatia.

== Career statistics ==
Statistics accurate as of the match played on 27 October 2024.

Appearances and goals by club, season and competition
| Club | Season | League | | | National Cup | | Continental | | Other | | Total | |
| Club | Season | Division | Apps | Goals | Apps | Goals | Apps | Goals | Apps | Goals | Apps | Goals |
|---|---|---|---|---|---|---|---|---|---|---|---|---|
| Guangzhou R&F | 2007 | Chinese Super League | 0 | 0 | - | | - | | - | | 0 | 0 |
| Guangzhou R&F | 2008 | Chinese Super League | 6 | 0 | - | | - | | - | | 6 | 0 |
| Guangzhou R&F | 2009 | Chinese Super League | 1 | 0 | - | | - | | - | | 1 | 0 |
| Guangzhou R&F | 2010 | Chinese Super League | 4 | 0 | - | | - | | - | | 4 | 0 |
| Guangzhou R&F | 2011 | China League One | 16 | 0 | 0 | 0 | - | | - | | 16 | 0 |
| Guangzhou R&F | 2012 | Chinese Super League | 0 | 0 | 0 | 0 | - | | - | | 0 | 0 |
| Guangzhou R&F | 2013 | Chinese Super League | 12 | 0 | 1 | 0 | - | | - | | 13 | 0 |
| Guangzhou R&F | Total | | 39 | 0 | 1 | 0 | 0 | 0 | 0 | 0 | 40 | 0 |
| Liaoning Whowin | 2014 | Chinese Super League | 1 | 0 | 0 | 0 | - | | - | | 1 | 0 |
| Liaoning Whowin | 2016 | Chinese Super League | 29 | 0 | 0 | 0 | - | | - | | 29 | 0 |
| Liaoning Whowin | 2017 | Chinese Super League | 25 | 0 | 0 | 0 | - | | - | | 25 | 0 |
| Liaoning Whowin | 2018 | China League One | 0 | 0 | 0 | 0 | - | | - | | 0 | 0 |
| Liaoning Whowin | Total | | 55 | 0 | 0 | 0 | 0 | 0 | 0 | 0 | 55 | 0 |
| Beijing Guoan (loan) | 2015 | Chinese Super League | 0 | 0 | 0 | 0 | 0 | 0 | - | | 0 | 0 |
| Changchun Yatai | 2019 | China League One | 30 | 0 | 0 | 0 | - | | - | | 30 | 0 |
| Changchun Yatai | 2020 | China League One | 15 | 0 | 0 | 0 | - | | - | | 15 | 0 |
| Changchun Yatai | 2021 | Chinese Super League | 15 | 0 | 2 | 0 | - | | - | | 17 | 0 |
| Changchun Yatai | Total | | 60 | 0 | 2 | 0 | 0 | 0 | 0 | 0 | 62 | 0 |
| Henan Songshan Longmen | 2022 | Chinese Super League | 4 | 0 | 1 | 0 | - | | - | | 5 | 0 |
| Jiangxi Lushan | 2023 | China League One | 12 | 0 | - | | - | | - | | 12 | 0 |
| Qingdao West Coast | 2024 | Chinese Super League | 13 | 0 | 1 | 0 | - | | - | | 14 | 0 |
| Career total | | | 183 | 0 | 5 | 0 | 0 | 0 | 0 | 0 | 188 | 0 |

== Honours ==
Changchun Yatai

- China League One: 2020.

Liaoning Tieren

- China League One: 2025
