= Wang Lüe =

Chinese footballer (born 1985)

Wang Lüe 王略
Personal information
- Date of birth: 19 May 1985 (age 41)
- Place of birth: Shenyang, Liaoning, China
- Height: 1.88 m (6 ft 2 in)
- Position: Goalkeeper

Team information
- Current team: Shenzhen Renren
- Number: 23

Youth career
- Guangdong Hongyuan
- Shenzhen Jianlibao

Senior career*
Years	Team	Apps	(Gls)
2005–2014	Guangzhou R&F	30	(0)
2016–	Shenzhen Renren	3	(0)
- * Club domestic league appearances and goals as of 17 September 2016

Wang Lüe (Chinese: 王略; pinyin: Wáng lüè; born 19 May 1985) is a Chinese football player who currently plays for China League Two side Shenzhen Renren.

== Club career ==
Wang played for Guangdong Hongyuan and Shenzhen Jianlibao youth team in the early year and moved to Chinese Super League side Changsha Ginde in July 2005. He made his senior debut on 16 July, in a 2–2 away draw against Beijing Guoan. He remained as club's first choice goalkeeper after this match and eventually made 13 league appearances in the 2005 league season. Wang became the third choice goalkeeper of the club as Zhang Lie returned to the first team and Song Zhenyu transferred in from Sichuan Guancheng. He didn't play for the first team until 17 May 2008, when Song and another goalkeeper Shi Xiaotian got injury. He played 7 matches in the 2008 season. However, Wang became the third choice goalkeeper again and couldn't appear in the next two seasons.

Changsha Ginde finished the bottom of the league and relegation to China League One in the 2010 league season. In February 2011, the club moved to Shenzhen as the club's name changed into Shenzhen Phoenix, Wang chose to stay in the club. He acted as back-up for Shi Xiaotian and became the regular starter after June. The club were bought by Chinese property developers Guangzhou R&F in the middle of the season and moved to Guangzhou and won promotion back to the Super League at the first attempt. Wang made 10 appearances in the 2011 league season. He announced his retirement from football in January 2016.

On 19 February 2016, Wang made his return to football and signed a contract with China League Two club Shenzhen Renren.

== Career statistics ==
Statistics accurate as of match played 17 September 2016

Club performance			League		Cup		League Cup		Continental		Total	
Season	Club	League	Apps	Goals	Apps	Goals	Apps	Goals	Apps	Goals	Apps	Goals
China PR			League		FA Cup		CSL Cup		Asia		Total	
2005	Guangzhou R&F	Chinese Super League	13	0	0	0	0	0	-		13	0
2006	Guangzhou R&F	Chinese Super League	0	0	0	0	-		-		0	0
2007	Guangzhou R&F	Chinese Super League	0	0	-		-		-		0	0
2008	Guangzhou R&F	Chinese Super League	7	0	-		-		-		7	0
2009	Guangzhou R&F	Chinese Super League	0	0	-		-		-		0	0
2010	Guangzhou R&F	Chinese Super League	0	0	-		-		-		0	0
2011	Guangzhou R&F	China League One	10	0	2	0	-		-		12	0
2012	Guangzhou R&F	Chinese Super League	0	0	0	0	-		-		0	0
2013	Guangzhou R&F	Chinese Super League	0	0	0	0	-		-		0	0
2014	Guangzhou R&F	Chinese Super League	0	0	0	0	-		-		0	0
2016	Shenzhen Renren	China League Two	3	0	1	0	-		-		4	0
Total	China PR		33	0	3	0	0	0	0	0	36	0
