= Sha Yibo =

Chinese footballer

Sha Yibo 沙一博
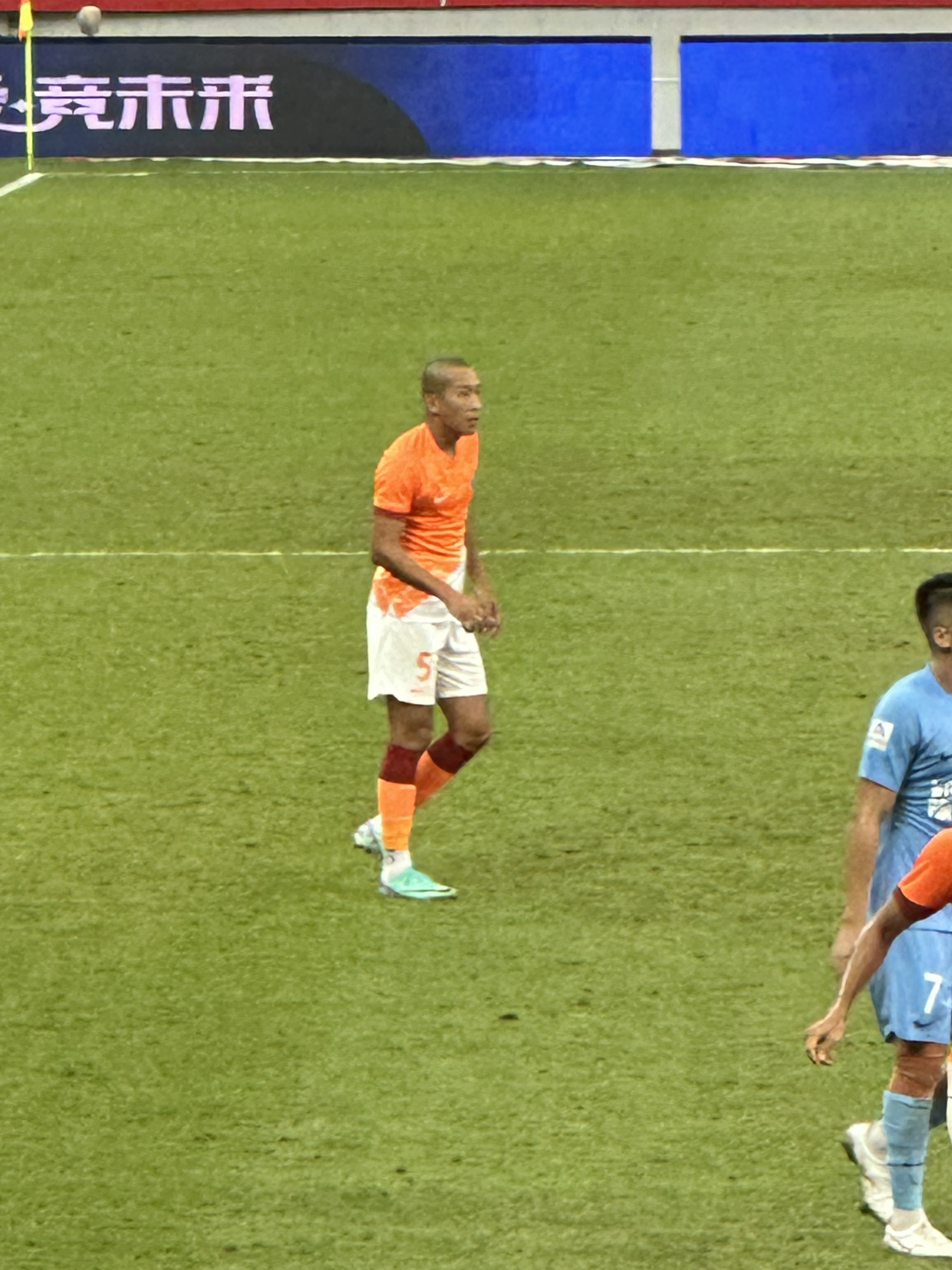
- Sha Yibo in August 2024

Personal information
- Full name: Sha Yibo
- Date of birth: 7 January 1991 (age 35)
- Place of birth: Qingdao, Shandong, China
- Height: 1.85 m (6 ft 1 in)
- Position: Defender

Youth career
- Qingdao Hailifeng

Senior career*
Years	Team	Apps	(Gls)
2009	Qingdao Hailifeng	8	(0)
2010–2025	Qingdao Hainiu	189	(24)
- * Club domestic league appearances and goals as of 28 August 2025

Sha Yibo (Chinese: 沙一博; pinyin: Shā Yībó; born 7 January 1991 in Qingdao, Shandong) is a Chinese retired footballer who played as a defender.

== Club career ==
Sha was promoted to China League One club Qingdao Hailifeng first team squad in 2009. He made his senior debut on 2 May 2009, in a 2–0 away defeat against Liaoning Whowin, coming on as a substitute for Zhang Tiangang in the 81st minute. On 21 February 2010, Qingdao Hailifeng was banned from all future national matches organised by the Chinese Football Association and subsequently dissolved for match-fixing the 22 September 2007 league game against Chengdu Blades to intentionally lose 2-0. While Sha was never suspected of any wrongdoing he still became an unattached player, however he would sign a contract with Chinese Super League side Qingdao Jonoon on 12 March 2010. On 23 April 2011, he made his debut for Qingdao Jonoon in a Super League match which Qingdao lost to Guangzhou Evergrande 2–0. He came on as a substitute for Song Wenjie in the 70th minute. On 27 June 2012, he scored his first and second senior goal in the third round of 2012 Chinese FA Cup, which ensured Qingdao Jonoon beat League Two side Guizhou Zhicheng 4–0.

At the end of the 2013 Chinese Super League campaign he would be part of the squad that was relegated. This would be followed by another relegation at the end of the 2016 China League One campaign. Throughout this, Sha would remain loyal towards the club as they re-branded themselves as Qingdao Hainiu. He would go on to play a vital part as the club won the third tier title and promotion at the end of the 2021 China League Two season. He would go on to achieve successive promotions as he helped guide the club to second in the 2022 China League One season and promotion back into the top tier.

After the 2025 season, Sha decided to retire from professional football.

== Career statistics ==
Statistics accurate as of match played 31 December 2022.

Appearances and goals by club, season and competition
Club	Season	League			National Cup		Continental		Other		Total	
Club	Season	Division	Apps	Goals	Apps	Goals	Apps	Goals	Apps	Goals	Apps	Goals
Qingdao Hailifeng	2009	China League One	8	0	-		-		-		8	0
Qingdao Jonoon/ Qingdao Hainiu	2010	Chinese Super League	0	0	-		-		-		0	0
Qingdao Jonoon/ Qingdao Hainiu	2011	Chinese Super League	1	0	1	0	-		-		2	0
Qingdao Jonoon/ Qingdao Hainiu	2012	Chinese Super League	3	0	1	2	-		-		4	2
Qingdao Jonoon/ Qingdao Hainiu	2013	Chinese Super League	1	0	2	0	-		-		3	0
Qingdao Jonoon/ Qingdao Hainiu	2014	China League One	1	0	1	0	-		-		2	0
Qingdao Jonoon/ Qingdao Hainiu	2015	China League One	7	0	3	0	-		-		10	0
Qingdao Jonoon/ Qingdao Hainiu	2016	China League One	10	0	2	0	-		-		12	0
Qingdao Jonoon/ Qingdao Hainiu	2017	China League Two	20	2	2	0	-		-		22	2
Qingdao Jonoon/ Qingdao Hainiu	2018	China League Two	26	8	1	0	-		-		27	8
Qingdao Jonoon/ Qingdao Hainiu	2019	China League Two	29	8	1	1	-		-		30	9
Qingdao Jonoon/ Qingdao Hainiu	2020	China League Two	8	0	-		-		-		8	0
Qingdao Jonoon/ Qingdao Hainiu	2021	China League Two	19	4	0	0	-		-		19	4
Qingdao Jonoon/ Qingdao Hainiu	2022	China League One	27	2	0	0	-		-		27	2
Qingdao Jonoon/ Qingdao Hainiu	Total		152	24	14	3	0	0	0	0	166	27
Career total			160	24	14	3	0	0	0	0	174	27

== Honours ==
=== Club ===
Qingdao Hainiu

- China League Two: 2021
