= Zhang Lei (footballer) =

Chinese footballer (born 1985)

Zhang Lei 张磊
Personal information
- Date of birth: April 6, 1985 (age 41)
- Place of birth: Tianjin, PR China
- Height: 1.88 m (6 ft 2 in)
- Position: Goalkeeper

Youth career
- 1998–2002: Guangdong Hongyuan
- 2002–2005: Dongguan Nancheng

Senior career*
Years	Team	Apps	(Gls)
2006–2008	Shenzhen Kingway	25	(0)
2009	Beijing Guoan	0	(0)
2010	Changsha Ginde	27	(0)
2011–2015	Chongqing Lifan	87	(0)
2016–2019	Zhejiang Greentown	13	(0)
2017	→ Yunnan Lijiang (loan)	20	(0)
- * Club domestic league appearances and goals as of 3 November 2018

Zhang Lei (Chinese: 张磊; born April 6, 1985, in Tianjin) is a Chinese football player as a goalkeeper.

== Club career ==
Zhang Lei began his professional football career with Shenzhen Kingway where he was the team's understudy goalkeeper to Xiao Jianjia. Despite being in his debut season he would still play in several games throughout the season with his first league game coming against Shanghai Shenhua on July 26, 2006, in a 1–0 defeat. His performances within his first few games were impressive enough for him to fight for the first choice goalkeeping position within the next season, however he was unable to hold on to this position and Xiao Jianjia regained his place within the team. The 2008 league season saw him once again play understudy throughout the season and while Xiao Jianjia was nearing retirement Shenzhen brought in Cheng Yuelei as his replacement at the end of the season. Zhang would then leave for Beijing Guoan where he spent the entire season as their third choice goalkeeper and did not receive any playing time.

Zhang would join Changsha Ginde to restart his career and was immediately promoted to the team's first choice goalkeeping position after Chinese international Song Zhenyu exited the club. While he saw significant playing time through the 2010 Chinese Super League season the club often lingered near the bottom of the table and Zhang wasn't able to help guide the club away from the relegation zone at the end of the season. At the beginning of the 2011 league season he would join second tier club Chongqing Lifan. With them he would go on to win the division title and promotion to the top tier at the end of the 2014 league season.

On 3 January 2016, Zhang transferred to fellow Chinese Super League side Hangzhou Greentown. He would make his competitive debut for them in the club's first league game of the season on March 6, 2016, against Changchun Yatai F.C. in a 2–1 victory. Within the season he would lose his place to Zou Dehai and see the club relegated at the end of the 2016 campaign. On 23 February 2017, Zhang was loaned to League One side Yunnan Lijiang until 31 December 2017.

== Honours ==
Beijing Guoan

- Chinese Super League: 2009

Chongqing Lifan

- China League One: 2014
