= Zhou Heng (physicist) =

Chinese physicist (1929–2025)

- 周恒
- Born: 20 November 1929; Shanghai, China
- Died: 1 August 2025 (aged 95); Tianjin, China
- Education: Peiyang University
- Scientific career
- Fields: Fluid dynamics
- Workplaces: Tianjin University

Chinese name
- Simplified Chinese: 周恒
- Traditional Chinese: 周恆
Transcriptions
Standard Mandarin
- Hanyu Pinyin: Zhōu Héng

Zhou Heng (20 November 1929 – 1 August 2025) was a Chinese physicist specializing in fluid dynamics.

== Life and career ==
Zhou was born in Shanghai, on 20 November 1929, while his ancestral home is in Pucheng County, Fujian. His father was a primary school teacher. He had two elder sisters. After the Imperial Japanese Army occupied Shanghai in 1937, his family fled to different cities to take refuge.

In 1946, Zhou was admitted to Peiyang University with the first ranking in his class, where he majored in Hydraulic and Ocean Engineering. After graduating in 1950, he stayed at the university (later regrouped as Tianjin University), where he successively was lecturer, professor, head of Department of Mechanics, vice-president and president of the Graduate School. He was a visiting scholar at the Department of Mathematics, Imperial College London between 1981 and 1982. In 1985, he was hired as a visiting professor at Brown University.

Zhou was a member of the 8th and 9th National Committee of the Chinese People's Political Consultative Conference.

Zhou died in Tianjin on 1 August 2025, at the age of 95.

== Honours and awards ==
- 1987 State Natural Science Award (Second Class)
- 1993 Member of the Chinese Academy of Sciences (CAS)
