= Li Jiaqi (footballer) =

Chinese footballer

Li Jiaqi 李佳奇
Personal information
- Date of birth: June 18, 1991 (age 35)
- Place of birth: Harbin, Heilongjiang, China
- Height: 1.80 m (5 ft 11 in)
- Position: Midfielder

Senior career*
Years	Team	Apps	(Gls)
2009–2013	Shenzhen Ruby	3	(0)
2010	→ Guangdong Sunray Cave (loan)	0	(0)
2012	→ Shenzhen Main Sports (loan)	18	(0)
2014–2015	Guizhou Zhicheng	1	(0)
- * Club domestic league appearances and goals as of 1 November 2015

Li Jiaqi (Chinese: 李佳奇; Born 18 June 1991 in Harbin) is a Chinese football player who currently plays for China League One side Guizhou Zhicheng.

== Club career ==
In 2009, Li Jiaqi started his professional football career with Shenzhen Ruby in the Chinese Super League. He would eventually make his league debut for Shenzhen on 8 May 2011 in a game against Guangzhou Evergrande. In 2012, he was loaned to China League Two side Shenzhen Main Sports until 31 December.

In January 2014, Li transferred to China League Two side Guizhou Zhicheng.

== Career statistics ==
Statistics accurate as of match played 1 November 2015

Club performance			League		Cup		League Cup		Continental		Total	
Season	Club	League	Apps	Goals	Apps	Goals	Apps	Goals	Apps	Goals	Apps	Goals
China PR			League		FA Cup		CSL Cup		Asia		Total	
2009	Shenzhen Ruby	Chinese Super League	0	0	-		-		-		0	0
2010	Guangdong Sunray Cave	China League One	0	0	-		-		-		0	0
2011	Shenzhen Ruby	Chinese Super League	3	0	0	0	-		-		3	0
2012	Shenzhen Main Sports	China League Two	18	0	0	0	-		-		18	0
2013	Shenzhen Ruby	China League One	0	0	0	0	-		-		0	0
2014	Guizhou Zhicheng	China League Two	1	0	0	0	-		-		1	0
2015	Guizhou Zhicheng	China League One	0	0	1	0	-		-		1	0
Total	China PR		22	0	1	0	0	0	0	0	23	0
