= Betão (footballer, born March 1983) =

Brazilian footballer (born 1983)

Personal information
- Full name: Everton da Silva Oliveira
- Date of birth: 10 March 1983 (age 43)
- Place of birth: São Vicente, Brazil
- Height: 1.76 m (5 ft 9 in)
- Position: Midfielder

Youth career
- Santos

Senior career*
Years	Team	Apps	(Gls)
2002–2005	Santos	5	(0)
2002	→ Jabaquara (loan)		
2005	Taquaritinga		
2005–2006	Nacional-SP		
2006	Atlético Sorocaba		
2007	XV de Jaú		
2007	Shanghai Stars	20	(6)
2008–2010	Anhui Jiufang	40	(5)
2010	Wuhan Zall	20	(1)
2012	Portuguesa Santista		
- * Club domestic league appearances and goals

Everton da Silva Oliveira (born 10 March 1983), commonly known as Betão, is a Brazilian retired footballer who played as a midfielder.

Everton used to play for several Brazilian football clubs before he came to China in 2007. He joined Shanghai Stars at first, and then moved to Anhui Jiufang. In February 2010, Hubei Greenery, which would play in China League One, confirmed that Everton had signed a contract with the club.
