= Zhou Heng (footballer) =

Chinese footballer

Zhou Heng 周恒
Personal information
- Date of birth: November 24, 1985 (age 40)
- Place of birth: Wuhan, Hubei, China
- Height: 1.77 m (5 ft 9 1/2 in)
- Positions: Midfielder; defender

Team information
- Current team: Hainan Star
- Number: 5

Youth career
- Wuhan Huanghelou

Senior career*
Years	Team	Apps	(Gls)
2005–2008	Wuhan Huanghelou	27	(0)
2009–2011	Chongqing Lifan	58	(1)
2012–2014	Wuhan Zall	30	(0)
2015–2018	Xinjiang Tianshan Leopard	102	(0)
2019–2022	Wuhan Three Towns	27	(1)
2022	Hainan Star	15	(3)
Total		259	(5)
- * Club domestic league appearances and goals

Zhou Heng (Chinese: 周恒; pinyin: Zhōu Héng; born November 24, 1985, in Wuhan, Hubei) is a Chinese former football player who currently plays as a midfielder or defender.

== Club career ==
Zhou Heng began his professional football career playing for the Wuhan Huanghelou youth team before moving up to the senior team in the 2005 league season when he made his league debut against Shenyang Ginde on July 6, 2005, in a 3–0 victory. The following seasons saw him steadily establish himself within the squad, however his development within the team was cut short after the sudden disbanding and relegation of Wuhan from the Chinese Super League after the club's management did not accept the punishment given to them by the Chinese Football Association after a scuffle broke out during a league game against Beijing Guoan on September 27, 2008. Still a young prospect with top tier experience he would join recently promoted side Chongqing Lifan for two million Yuan with teammate Wu Peng.

Joining Chongqing Lifan at the beginning of the 2009 league season Zhou would immediately command a regular place within the side and would even personally score his first league goal against Shandong Luneng on October 10, 2009, in a 1–1 draw. While he personally had a constructive season it was a disappointing campaign for Chongqing who finished at the bottom of the league.

In February 2015, Zhou transferred to fellow China League One side Xinjiang Tianshan Leopard.

In February 2019, Zhou transferred to League Two side Wuhan Three Towns. The following season he would go on to aid them in winning the division title and promotion into the second tier. This would be followed by another division title win and promotion as the club entered the top tier for the first tine in their history. After three seasons he would move to third tier club Hainan Star.

On 29 January 2026, Zhou was given a lifetime ban for match-fixing by the Chinese Football Association.

== Career statistics ==
Appearances and goals by club, season and competition
Club	Season	League			National Cup		Continental		Other		Total	
Club	Season	Division	Apps	Goals	Apps	Goals	Apps	Goals	Apps	Goals	Apps	Goals
Wuhan Huanghelou	2005	Chinese Super League	6	0	0	0	-		-		6	0
Wuhan Huanghelou	2006	Chinese Super League	10	0	1	0	-		-		11	0
Wuhan Huanghelou	2007	Chinese Super League	2	0	-		-		-		2	0
Wuhan Huanghelou	2008	Chinese Super League	9	0	-		-		-		9	0
Wuhan Huanghelou	Total		27	0	1	0	0	0	0	0	28	0
Chongqing Lifan	2009	Chinese Super League	28	1	-		-		-		28	1
Chongqing Lifan	2010	Chinese Super League	13	0	-		-		-		13	0
Chongqing Lifan	2011	China League One	17	0	1	0	-		-		18	0
Chongqing Lifan	Total		58	1	1	0	0	0	0	0	59	1
Wuhan Zall	2012	China League One	15	0	0	0	-		-		0	0
Wuhan Zall	2013	Chinese Super League	7	0	0	0	-		-		0	0
Wuhan Zall	2014	China League One	8	0	0	0	-		-		8	0
Wuhan Zall	Total		30	0	0	0	0	0	0	0	30	0
Xinjiang Tianshan Leopard	2015	China League One	26	0	3	0	-		-		29	0
Xinjiang Tianshan Leopard	2016	China League One	27	0	2	0	-		-		29	0
Xinjiang Tianshan Leopard	2017	China League One	25	0	0	0	-		-		25	0
Xinjiang Tianshan Leopard	2018	China League One	24	0	0	0	-		-		24	0
Xinjiang Tianshan Leopard	Total		102	0	5	0	0	0	0	0	107	0
Wuhan Three Towns	2019	China League Two	10	0	0	0	-		-		10	0
Wuhan Three Towns	2020	China League Two	11	1	-		-		-		11	1
Wuhan Three Towns	2021	China League One	6	0	2	1	-		-		8	1
Wuhan Three Towns	Total		27	1	2	1	0	0	0	0	29	2
Hainan Star	2022	China League Two	15	3	-		-		-		15	3
Career total			259	5	9	1	0	0	0	0	268	6

== Honours ==
=== Club ===
Wuhan Three Towns

- China League One: 2021
- China League Two: 2020
