= Agnaldo (footballer, born 1978) =

Brazilian footballer

Personal information
- Full name: Agnaldo Novaes dos Santos
- Date of birth: 7 March 1978 (age 48)
- Place of birth: Salvador BA, Brazil
- Height: 1.90 m (6 ft 3 in)
- Position: Midfielder

Senior career*
Years	Team	Apps	(Gls)
2001–2002	Flamengo	5	(0)
2007	Vilavelhense ES		
2008	Águia Negra MS		
2009	Vila Nova GO		
2009	Chengdu Blades	14	(1)
2010	Shenyang Dongjin	10	(0)
2012	Rio Branco-ES		
2014–2016	Castelo		
- * Club domestic league appearances and goals

Agnaldo Novaes dos Santos (born 7 March 1978), known as Agnaldo, is a Brazilian former professional footballer who played as a midfielder.

== Career ==
Agnaldo used to play for several Brazilian football clubs such as Flamengo, Águia Negra MS, Vilavelhense ES and Vila Nova GO.

Agnaldo moved to China and joined a top tier club Chengdu Blades during the 2009 league season. He played 14 league games, scored 1 goal in 2009 and was released by the club. He signed a contract with Shenyang Dongjin on 2 March 2010.
