= Liu Ji (footballer) =

Chinese footballer

Liu Ji 刘骥
Personal information
- Date of birth: December 27, 1990 (age 35)
- Place of birth: Guiyang, Guizhou, China
- Height: 1.67 m (5 ft 5 1/2 in)
- Position: Midfielder

Youth career
- Jiangsu Sainty

Senior career*
Years	Team	Apps	(Gls)
2009–2013	Jiangsu Sainty	0	(0)
2011	→ Guizhou Zhicheng (loan)	8	(0)
2014	Guizhou Zhicheng	0	(0)

International career
2006	China U-17		
- * Club domestic league appearances and goals as of 16 November 2012

Liu Ji (Chinese: 刘骥; pinyin: Liú Jì; born 27 December 1990) is a Chinese football player who currently plays for Guizhou Zhicheng.

== Club career ==
Liu was promoted to Jiangsu Sainty's first team squad in 2009. He didn't have too much chance to play for the first team and was loaned to China League One side Guizhou Zhicheng for half year in July 2011. Liu made 8 appearances in the 2011 League One season, however, Guizhou Zhicheng finished the last place of the league and relegated via League One relegation play-off which lost to Fujian Smart Hero 6-5 in the Penalty shootout.

In February 2014, Liu transferred to Guizhou Zhicheng.

== International career ==
Liu played for China U-17 in the 2006 AFC U-17 Championship.

== Career statistics ==
Club performance			League		Cup		League Cup		Continental		Total	
Season	Club	League	Apps	Goals	Apps	Goals	Apps	Goals	Apps	Goals	Apps	Goals
China PR			League		FA Cup		CSL Cup		Asia		Total	
2009	Jiangsu Sainty	Chinese Super League	0	0	-		-		-		0	0
2010	Jiangsu Sainty	Chinese Super League	0	0	-		-		-		0	0
2011	Jiangsu Sainty	Chinese Super League	0	0	0	0	-		-		0	0
2011	Guizhou Zhicheng	China League One	8	0	0	0	-		-		8	0
2012	Jiangsu Sainty	Chinese Super League	0	0	0	0	-		-		0	0
Total	China PR		8	0	0	0	0	0	0	0	8	0

Statistics accurate as of match played 16 November 2012
