= Luiz Henrique Tosta =

Brazilian footballer

Personal information
- Full name: Luiz Henrique Tosta
- Date of birth: 1 June 1985 (age 41)
- Place of birth: Curitiba (PR), Brazil
- Height: 1.87 m (6 ft 1 1/2 in)
- Position: Defender

Team information
- Current team: Corumbaense

Senior career*
Years	Team	Apps	(Gls)
2006	União Bandeirante		
2007–2008	Botafogo-DF		
2008	Deportivo Xinabajul		
2008–2009	Ceilândia		
2009	Palmas		
2009	Londrina		
2010	Guangdong Sunray Cave		
2011	Inter de Santa Maria		
2012	Sertãozinho		
2012	Riograndense		
2013	América-SP		
2013	Rio Grande		
2013	Itapirense		
2015	Prudentópolis		
2015	Rio Preto		
2016	São Luiz		
2017–	Corumbaense		
- * Club domestic league appearances and goals as of 1 April 2010

Luiz Henrique Tosta (born 1 June 1985), is a Brazilian footballer who plays for Corumbaense.

== Club career ==
Luiz Henrique Tosta began his career playing for league clubs in Brazil, such as Botafogo, Platinense, Ceilândia, Palmas and Londrina. He also played for Deportivo Xinabajul in Guatemala.

Tosta moved to China and signed a contract with Guangdong Sunray Cave in 2010. He made his China League One debut on 25 April.

Tosta returned to Brazil to play for Inter de Santa Maria. He had one year playing for São Paulo teams, having played three months in South Korea where he did not achieve great success, in 2014 he moved to S.E. Itapirense to compete in the Paulista championship serieA2 and immediately had an offer to return to play in Guatemala where he was the champion of the opening tournament and then champion of champions of the first division of Guatemala. His new team was CD Petapa, champion of Apertura 2013 Guatemala first division, where the athlete won his first title of the season and his third in the country, Copa Amistad oF Guatemala 2014 where the team will win CSD Suchitepequez by the score 3–1.

== Honours ==
Corumbaense

- Campeonato Sul-Mato-Grossense: 2017

== Sources ==
- "Cadastro GrupoRBS". Clicrbs.com.br.
- "Ayutla tendrá dos bajas". Guatefutbol.com.
- "PCI | Portal Cidade de Itapira". Cidadedeitapira.com.br.
- "PCI | Portal Cidade de Itapira". Cidadedeitapira.com.br.
- "Diario da Região". Diarioweb.com.br.
- "Federação Paulista de Futebol". Futebolpaulista.com.br.
- "Diario da Região". M.diarioweb.com.br.
- "América Futebol Clube - São José do Rio Preto - SP". America-sp.com.br. Archived from the original on 13 July 2015.
