= Ao Feifan =

Chinese footballer

Ao Feifan 敖飞帆
Personal information
- Date of birth: January 24, 1989 (age 37)
- Place of birth: Wuhan, Hubei, China
- Height: 1.80 m (5 ft 11 in)
- Position: Defensive midfielder

Youth career
- Genbao Football Base

Senior career*
Years	Team	Apps	(Gls)
2006–2009	Shanghai East Asia	9	(1)
2010–2013	Wuhan Zall	42	(3)
2014–2015	Jiangxi Liansheng	14	(0)
2016–2019	Jilin Baijia	49	(2)
- * Club domestic league appearances and goals as of 12 October 2019

Ao Feifan (Chinese: 敖飞帆; pinyin: Áo Fēifān; born January 24, 1989) is a former professional Chinese footballer who played as a defensive midfielder.

== Club career ==
Ao Feifan was promoted to Shanghai East Asia's first team squad in 2006. On 10 February 2010, Ao transferred to China League One side Hubei Greenery. On 20 October 2013, he made his debut for Wuhan in the 2013 Chinese Super League against Shanghai East Asia.

In March 2014, Ao transferred to China League Two side Jiangxi Liansheng.

== Career statistics ==
Statistics accurate as of match played 12 October 2019.

Club performance			League		Cup		League Cup		Continental		Total	
Season	Club	League	Apps	Goals	Apps	Goals	Apps	Goals	Apps	Goals	Apps	Goals
China PR			League		FA Cup		CSL Cup		Asia		Total	
2006	Shanghai East Asia	China League Two			-		-		-			
2007	Shanghai East Asia	China League Two			-		-		-			
2008	Shanghai East Asia	China League One	0	0	-		-		-		0	0
2009	Shanghai East Asia	China League One	9	1	-		-		-		9	1
2010	Wuhan Zall	China League One	11	0	-		-		-		11	0
2011	Wuhan Zall	China League One	22	3	0	0	-		-		22	3
2012	Wuhan Zall	China League One	8	0	0	0	-		-		8	0
2013	Wuhan Zall	Chinese Super League	1	0	0	0	-		-		1	0
2014	Jiangxi Liansheng	China League Two	9	0	0	0	-		-		9	0
2015	Jiangxi Liansheng	China League One	5	0	1	0	-		-		6	0
2016	Jilin Baijia	Amateur League			-		-		-			
2017	Jilin Baijia	China League Two	16	0	1	0	-		-		17	0
2018	Jilin Baijia	China League Two	15	0	1	0	-		-		16	0
2019	Jilin Baijia	China League Two	18	2	5	0	-		-		23	2
Total	China PR		114	6	8	0	0	0	0	0	122	6
