= Cho Se-kwon =

South Korean footballer

Cho Se-Kwon 조세권
Personal information
- Full name: Cho Se-Kwon
- Date of birth: June 26, 1978 (age 48)
- Place of birth: South Korea
- Height: 1.84 m (6 ft 0 in)
- Position: Defender

Youth career
- 1997–2000: Korea University

Senior career*
Years	Team	Apps	(Gls)
2001–2006	Ulsan Hyundai Horang-i	139	(1)
2007	Chunnam Dragons	1	(0)
2008	Goyang KB	16	(2)
2009	Liaoning Hongyun	9	(0)
2010	Chongqing Lifan	6	(0)

International career^{‡}
1997	South Korea U-20		
1999–2000	South Korea U-23	14	(0)
1998–2000	South Korea	11	(0)
- * Club domestic league appearances and goals as of 15 August 2009 ‡ National team caps and goals as of 10 October 2008

- Cho Se-kwon
- Hangul: 조세권
- Hanja: 趙世權
- RR: Jo Segwon
- MR: Cho Segwŏn

Cho Se-Kwon (born June 26, 1978) is a South Korean former professional football player.

As a player he represented Chunnam Dragons, Ulsan Hyundai Horang-i, Goyang Kookmin Bank as well as Chinese clubs Liaoning Hongyun and Chongqing Lifan. While internationally he was a part of the South Korea U23 team that took part in the 2000 Summer Olympics.

== Career statistics ==
As of 1 January 2011

Club performance			League		Cup		League Cup		Continental		Total	
Season	Club	League	Apps	Goals	Apps	Goals	Apps	Goals	Apps	Goals	Apps	Goals
South Korea			League		KFA Cup		League Cup		Asia		Total	
2001	Ulsan Hyundai Horang-i	K-League	24	0	?	?	4	0	-			
2002	Ulsan Hyundai Horang-i	K-League	21	0	?	?	6	0	-			
2003	Ulsan Hyundai Horang-i	K-League	39	1	4	0	-		-		43	1
2004	Ulsan Hyundai Horang-i	K-League	23	0	4	0	9	0	-		36	0
2005	Ulsan Hyundai Horang-i	K-League	20	0	1	0	11	0	-		32	0
2006	Ulsan Hyundai Horang-i	K-League	12	0	0	0	10	0	?	?		
2007	Chunnam Dragons	K-League	1	0	0	0	0	0	?	?		
2008	Goyang Kookmin Bank	Korea National League	16	2	1	0	-		-		17	2
China PR			League		FA Cup		CSL Cup		Asia		Total	
2009	Liaoning Hongyun	China League One	9	0	-	-	-	-	-		9	0
2010	Chongqing Lifan	Chinese Super League	6	0	-	-	-	-	-		6	0
Total	South Korea		156	3			40	0				
Total	China PR		15	0								
Career total			171	3			40	0				

== Honours ==
Ulsan Hyundai Horang-i

- K-League: 2005

Liaoning Hongyun

- China League One: 2009
