= Zhang Mengqi =

Chinese footballer

Zhang Mengqi 张萌祺
Personal information
- Full name: Zhang Mengqi
- Date of birth: 10 October 1989 (age 37)
- Place of birth: Shanghai, China
- Height: 1.78 m (5 ft 10 in)
- Position: Midfielder

Youth career
- 2000–2005: Genbao Football Base
- 2007: Shanghai Shenhua

Senior career*
Years	Team	Apps	(Gls)
2006	Shanghai East Asia		
2008–2009	Shanghai East Asia	18	(2)
2010	Shanghai Zobon	21	(0)
2011	Hubei CTGU Kangtian	14	(0)
2012–2013	Hubei China-Kyle	15	(0)
2014–2021	Guizhou Zhicheng	101	(1)
2022	Zibo Cuju	14	(1)
- * Club domestic league appearances and goals as of 27 April 2022

Zhang Mengqi (simplified Chinese: 张萌祺; traditional Chinese: 張萌祺; pinyin: Zhāng Méngqí; born 10 October 1989) is a Chinese former footballer.

== Club career ==
Zhang Mengqi joined Genbao Football Academy in 2000 and graduated to China League Two side Shanghai East Asia's first team at the beginning of the 2006 league season. He moved to Shanghai Shenhua's youth academy in 2007 and returned to Shanghai East Asia in 2008 for the 2008 China League One season. He scored his first senior goal on 15 November 2008 in a 2–1 away loss against Wuxi Zobon. He scored his second goal on 29 August 2009 in a 6–1 home victory against Sichuan F.C.

Zhang transferred to fellow League One side Shanghai Zobon in December 2009. He was linked with Shanghai East Asia and Chongqing Lifan at the end of 2010 season. He failed to pass the trial and joined China League Two side Hubei CTGU Kangtian in March 2011. Zhang transferred to another League Two club Hubei China-Kyle in 2012 and followed the club promote to the second tier in the 2012 season.

Zhang transferred to China League Two side Guizhou Zhicheng in 2014. He was the key player of Guizhou to win promotion to China League One in 2014 season and promotion to Chinese Super League in 2016 season. He extended his contract with the club on 14 January 2017. On 11 March 2017, Zhang made his Super League debut in a 1–1 home draw against Beijing Guoan.

== Career statistics ==
As of 31 December 2020.

Appearances and goals by club, season and competition
Club	Season	League			National Cup		Continental		Other		Total	
Club	Season	Division	Apps	Goals	Apps	Goals	Apps	Goals	Apps	Goals	Apps	Goals
Shanghai East Asia	2006	China League Two			-		-		-			
Shanghai East Asia	2008	China League One	13	1	-		-		-		13	1
Shanghai East Asia	2009	China League One	5	1	-		-		-		5	1
Shanghai East Asia	Total		18	2	0	0	0	0	0	0	18	2
Shanghai Zobon	2010	China League One	21	0	-		-		-		21	0
Hubei CTGU Kangtian	2011	China League Two	14	0	-		-		-		14	0
Hubei China-Kyle	2012	China League Two	13	0	-		-		-		13	0
Hubei China-Kyle	2013	China League One	2	0	1	0	-		-		3	0
Hubei China-Kyle	Total		15	0	1	0	0	0	0	0	16	0
Guizhou Zhicheng	2014	China League Two	18	0	1	0	-		-		19	0
Guizhou Zhicheng	2015	China League One	25	0	0	0	-		-		25	0
Guizhou Zhicheng	2016	China League One	21	0	1	0	-		-		22	0
Guizhou Zhicheng	2017	Chinese Super League	10	0	1	0	-		-		11	0
Guizhou Zhicheng	2018	Chinese Super League	6	0	3	0	-		-		9	0
Guizhou Zhicheng	2019	China League One	3	0	1	0	-		-		4	0
Guizhou Zhicheng	2020	China League One	6	0	0	0	-		-		6	0
Guizhou Zhicheng	Total		89	0	7	0	0	0	0	0	96	0
Career total			157	2	8	0	0	0	0	0	165	2
