= Zhang Tiangang =

Chinese association football player

Personal information
- Date of birth: 20 February 1985 (age 41)
- Place of birth: Beijing, China
- Height: 1.74 m (5 ft 9 in)
- Position: Forward

Youth career
- 2001–2004: Xiamen Blue Lions

Senior career*
Years	Team	Apps	(Gls)
2004–2007	Xiamen Blue Lions		
2008–2009	Qingdao Hailifeng		
2010–2011	Nanchang Hengyuan	10	(1)
Total		10	(1)
- * Club domestic league appearances and goals

Zhang Tiangang (simplified Chinese: 张天罡; traditional Chinese: 張天罡; pinyin: Zhāng Tiāngāng; born 20 February 1985) is a Chinese former footballer.

== Career ==
=== Early career ===
Born in Beijing, Zhang was selected to study at the China Football School in Qinhuangdao at the age of twelve. Four years later, in July 2001, he was signed by professional club Xiamen Blue Lions (then known as Xiamen Hongshi), but would remain on the bench for most games. Following the arrival of manager Gao Hongbo in February 2004, Zhang saw his playing time increase, and he helped the club reach the Chinese Super League ahead of the 2006 season.

=== Qingdao Hailifeng match-fixing scandal ===
Following Gao's departure as head coach during the 2006 season, Zhang would also leave the club after the following year, dropping down to the China League One with Qingdao Hailifeng. It was at Qingdao Hailifeng that he would be subject to allegations of match-fixing. In the match against Sichuan in September 2009, Qingdao Hailifeng were leading 3–0 with twenty minutes remaining, however club chairman Du Yunqi had bet before the game that there would be four goals scored, and instructed his players to score in either goal. Zhang was one of the players to attempt to score an own goal, alongside teammate Li Ming, whose first effort was saved by goalkeeper Mu Pengfei, before a second hit the post.

Zhang's own effort went wide of the goal, and Qingdao Hailifeng went on to win 3–0. Zhang denied the allegations, stating that he "would have been fired by the club long ago", had he been involved in any match-fixing. While teammates Li Ming and Du Bin were given lifetime bans by the Chinese Football Association (CFA), Zhang escaped punishment, with media in Nanchang describing him as "a survivor of the shipwreck".

=== Later career ===
Following the suspension of Qingdao Hailifeng by the CFA, Zhang joined Chinese Super League club Nanchang Hengyuan for the 2010 season.

== Career statistics ==
=== Club ===
Appearances and goals by club, season and competition
Club	Season	League			Cup (Note: Includes Chinese FA Cup)		Other		Total	
Club	Season	Division	Apps	Goals	Apps	Goals	Apps	Goals	Apps	Goals
Xiamen Blue Lions	2006	Chinese Super League	18	2	0	0	0	0	18	2
Xiamen Blue Lions	2007	Chinese Super League	18	0	0	0	0	0	18	0
Xiamen Blue Lions	Total		36	2	0	0	0	0	36	2
Nanchang Hengyuan	2010	Chinese Super League	5	1	0	0	0	0	5	1
Nanchang Hengyuan	2011	Chinese Super League	5	0	0	0	0	0	5	0
Nanchang Hengyuan	Total		10	1	0	0	0	0	10	1
Career total			46	3	0	0	0	0	46	3
