= Ye Zhanggen =

Chinese association football player

Personal information
- Date of birth: 7 May 1984 (age 42)
- Place of birth: Shanghai, China
- Height: 1.78 m (5 ft 10 in)
- Position: Midfielder

Senior career*
Years	Team	Apps	(Gls)
2009	Shaanxi Baorong Chanba	3	(0)
2010–2011	Nanchang Hengyuan	1	(0)
- Qingdao QUST
- * Club domestic league appearances and goals

Ye Zhanggen (simplified Chinese: 叶张根; traditional Chinese: 葉張根; pinyin: Yè Zhānggēn; born 7 May 1984) is a former Chinese footballer.

== Career statistics ==
=== Club ===
Club	Season	League			Cup		Other		Total	
Club	Season	Division	Apps	Goals	Apps	Goals	Apps	Goals	Apps	Goals
Shaanxi Baorong Chanba	2009	Chinese Super League	3	0	0	0	0	0	3	0
Nanchang Hengyuan	2010	Chinese Super League	1	0	0	0	0	0	1	0
Nanchang Hengyuan	2011	Chinese Super League	0	0	0	0	0	0	0	0
Nanchang Hengyuan	Total		1	0	0	0	0	0	1	0
Career total			4	0	0	0	0	0	4	0
