= Wu Peng (footballer) =

Chinese association football player

Personal information
- Date of birth: 15 August 1982 (age 44)
- Place of birth: Wuhan, China
- Height: 1.70 m (5 ft 7 in)
- Position: Midfielder

Senior career*
| Years | Team | Apps | (Gls) |
| 2002–2008 | Wuhan Optics Valley | 78 | (2) |
| 2009 | Hubei Greenery | 0 | (0) |
| 2009 | → Chongqing Lifan (loan) | 20 | (1) |
| 2010–2015 | Chongqing Lifan | 119 | (8) |
| 2016 | Nantong Zhiyun | 9 | (1) |
| 2017–2018 | Xinjiang Tianshan Leopard | 39 | (3) |
- * Club domestic league appearances and goals as of 14:01, 6 June 2019 (UTC)

Wu Peng (simplified Chinese: 吴鹏; traditional Chinese: 吳鵬; pinyin: Wú Péng; born 15 August 1982) is a Chinese footballer.

== Career statistics ==
=== Club ===
As of 6 June 2019.

| Club | Season | League | | | Cup | | Continental | | Other | | Total | |
| Club | Season | Division | Apps | Goals | Apps | Goals | Apps | Goals | Apps | Goals | Apps | Goals |
|---|---|---|---|---|---|---|---|---|---|---|---|---|
| Wuhan Optics Valley | 2002 | Chinese Jia-B League | 78 | 2 | 0 | 0 | – | | 0 | 0 | 78 | 2 |
| Wuhan Optics Valley | 2003 | Chinese Jia-B League | 78 | 2 | 0 | 0 | – | | 0 | 0 | 78 | 2 |
| Wuhan Optics Valley | 2004 | China League One | 78 | 2 | 0 | 0 | – | | 0 | 0 | 78 | 2 |
| Wuhan Optics Valley | 2005 | Chinese Super League | 78 | 2 | 0 | 0 | – | | 0 | 0 | 78 | 2 |
| Wuhan Optics Valley | 2006 | Chinese Super League | 78 | 2 | 0 | 0 | – | | 0 | 0 | 78 | 2 |
| Wuhan Optics Valley | 2007 | Chinese Super League | 78 | 2 | 0 | 0 | – | | 0 | 0 | 78 | 2 |
| Wuhan Optics Valley | 2008 | Chinese Super League | 78 | 2 | 0 | 0 | – | | 0 | 0 | 78 | 2 |
| Wuhan Optics Valley | Total | | 78 | 2 | 0 | 0 | 0 | 0 | 0 | 0 | 78 | 2 |
| Hubei Greenery | 2009 | China League Two | 0 | 0 | 0 | 0 | – | | 0 | 0 | 0 | 0 |
| Chongqing Lifan (loan) | 2009 | Chinese Super League | 20 | 1 | 0 | 0 | – | | 0 | 0 | 20 | 1 |
| Chongqing Lifan | 2010 | Chinese Super League | 20 | 1 | 0 | 0 | – | | 0 | 0 | 20 | 1 |
| Chongqing Lifan | 2011 | China League One | 117 | 6 | 0 | 0 | – | | 0 | 0 | 119 | 6 |
| Chongqing Lifan | 2012 | China League One | 117 | 6 | 0 | 0 | – | | 0 | 0 | 119 | 6 |
| Chongqing Lifan | 2013 | China League One | 117 | 6 | 2 (Note: Appearances in the Chinese FA Cup) | 0 | – | | 0 | 0 | 119 | 6 |
| Chongqing Lifan | 2014 | China League One | 117 | 6 | 0 | 0 | – | | 0 | 0 | 119 | 6 |
| Chongqing Lifan | 2015 | Chinese Super League | 2 | 0 | 2 | 0 | – | | 0 | 0 | 4 | 0 |
| Chongqing Lifan | Total | | 139 | 8 | 4 | 0 | 0 | 0 | 0 | 0 | 143 | 8 |
| Nantong Zhiyun | 2016 | China League Two | 9 | 1 | 0 | 0 | – | | 1 (Note: Appearances in the China League Two playoffs) | 0 | 10 | 1 |
| Xinjiang Tianshan Leopard | 2017 | China League One | 26 | 2 | 0 | 0 | – | | 0 | 0 | 26 | 2 |
| Xinjiang Tianshan Leopard | 2018 | China League One | 13 | 1 | 1 | 0 | – | | 0 | 0 | 14 | 1 |
| Xinjiang Tianshan Leopard | Total | | 39 | 3 | 1 | 0 | 0 | 0 | 0 | 0 | 40 | 3 |
| Career total | | | 265 | 14 | 5 | 0 | 0 | 0 | 1 | 0 | 271 | 14 |

== Honours ==
=== Club ===
Wuhan Optics Valley

- China League One: 2004

Chongqing Lifan

- China League One: 2014
