= Han Chao =

Chinese footballer

Han Chao 韩超
Personal information
- Date of birth: January 31, 1989 (age 37)
- Place of birth: Luoyang, Henan, China
- Height: 1.78 m (5 ft 10 in)
- Position: Defender

Team information
- Current team: Henan Oriental Classic

Senior career*
| Years | Team | Apps | (Gls) |
| 2008–2009 | Shanghai Dongya | 7 | (0) |
| 2010 | Nanjing Yoyo | 22 | (2) |
| 2011–2017 | Henan Jianye | 2 | (0) |
| 2017-2018 | Hainan Boying | 17 | (0) |
| 2018–2021 | Kunshan FC | 31 | (3) |
| 2022- | Henan Oriental Classic | 0 | (0) |
- * Club domestic league appearances and goals as of 13 April 2022

Han Chao (Chinese: 韩超; born 31 January 1989) is a Chinese professional footballer who currently plays for Henan Oriental Classic.

== Club career ==
In 2008, Han Chao started his professional footballer career with Shanghai Dongya in the China League One.

In February 2010, Han transferred to China League One side Nanjing Yoyo.

In July 2011, Han transferred to Chinese Super League side Henan Jianye on a free transfer. He would eventually make his league debut for Henan on 28 September 2012 in a game against Shanghai Shenhua, coming on as a substitute for Huang Xiyang in the 79th minute.

== Career statistics ==
Statistics accurate as of match played 31 December 2020.

Appearances and goals by club, season and competition
| Club | Season | League | | | National Cup | | Continental | | Other | | Total | |
| Club | Season | Division | Apps | Goals | Apps | Goals | Apps | Goals | Apps | Goals | Apps | Goals |
|---|---|---|---|---|---|---|---|---|---|---|---|---|
| Shanghai Dongya | 2008 | China League One | 3 | 0 | - | | - | | - | | 3 | 0 |
| Shanghai Dongya | 2009 | China League One | 4 | 0 | - | | - | | - | | 4 | 0 |
| Shanghai Dongya | Total | | 7 | 0 | 0 | 0 | 0 | 0 | 0 | 0 | 7 | 0 |
| Nanjing Yoyo | 2010 | China League One | 22 | 2 | - | | - | | - | | 22 | 2 |
| Henan Jianye | 2011 | Chinese Super League | 0 | 0 | 0 | 0 | - | | - | | 0 | 0 |
| Henan Jianye | 2012 | Chinese Super League | 1 | 0 | 1 | 0 | - | | - | | 2 | 0 |
| Henan Jianye | 2013 | China League One | 1 | 0 | 1 | 0 | - | | - | | 2 | 0 |
| Henan Jianye | 2014 | Chinese Super League | 0 | 0 | 0 | 0 | - | | - | | 0 | 0 |
| Henan Jianye | Total | | 2 | 0 | 2 | 0 | 0 | 0 | 0 | 0 | 4 | 0 |
| Hainan Boying | 2017 | China League Two | 17 | 0 | 0 | 0 | - | | - | | 17 | 0 |
| Zhenjiang Huasa/ Kunshan FC | 2018 | China League Two | 8 | 1 | 0 | 0 | - | | - | | 8 | 1 |
| Zhenjiang Huasa/ Kunshan FC | 2019 | China League Two | 23 | 2 | 1 | 0 | - | | - | | 24 | 2 |
| Zhenjiang Huasa/ Kunshan FC | Total | | 31 | 3 | 1 | 0 | 0 | 0 | 0 | 0 | 32 | 3 |
| Career total | | | 79 | 5 | 3 | 0 | 0 | 0 | 0 | 0 | 82 | 4 |

== Honours ==
=== Club ===
Henan Jianye

- China League One: 2013
