= Zhang Ke =

Chinese footballer

Zhang Ke 张可
Personal information
- Full name: Zhang Ke
- Date of birth: 20 March 1985 (age 41)
- Place of birth: Shenyang, Liaoning, China
- Height: 1.78 m (5 ft 10 in)
- Positions: Defender; wingback

Senior career*
Years	Team	Apps	(Gls)
2003–2008	Shenyang Ginde	45	(0)
2009	Shenyang Dongjin	22	(0)
2010	Jiangsu Sainty	11	(0)
2011	Shaanxi Chanba	0	(0)
2012–2017	Henan Jianye	19	(0)

International career
2006	China U-23	1	(0)
Medal record
Representing China
Men's football
AFC Youth Championship
Silver medal – second place	2004 َ Malaysia	Team
- * Club domestic league appearances and goals as of 4 November 2017

Zhang Ke (simplified Chinese: 张可; traditional Chinese: 張可; pinyin: Zhāng Kě; born 20 March 1985) is a Chinese former football as defender.

== Club career ==
Zhang Ke would make his senior club debut on June 20, 2004, for Shenyang Ginde in a league game vs Liaoning Zhongyu that Shenyang Ginde lost 1–0. After that game Zhang would gradually start to establish himself within the Shanyang team and go on to play in ten league games for the team at the end of the season, however his development would be halted when it was discovered that he took a banned drug during December 2004 and was banned from playing for two months despite claims that he took the drug by mistake. Being out for such a period saw Zhang having to re-establish himself within the team and it was only during the 2006 league season did he start to become a regular first team member. This did not continue the following season and he only featured in ten more league games for the recently relocated and renamed Changsha Ginde. The move to Changsha in Hunan didn't seem to get the best out Zhang and he was dropped by the recently appointed Slobodan Santrač during the 2008 league season. At the beginning of the 2009 league season Zhang had a chance to return to his hometown of Shenyang with second-tier football club Shenyang Dongjin. After only one season with the club Zhang had a chance to return to the Chinese Super League with Jiangsu Sainty who asked for his transfer at the beginning of the 2010 league season.

== International career ==
Zhang Ke would be called up into Ratomir Dujković's squad to instead injured defender Ji Mingyi. He made his debut against Iraq in a 1–0 win on the 30 November 2006, the first match of 2006 Asian Games, but he received red card at the 41 minutes.

== Honours ==
Henan Construction

- China League One: 2013
