= Li Yinan =

Chinese footballer (born 1979)

Li Yinan 李毅男
Personal information
- Date of birth: 25 February 1979 (age 47)
- Place of birth: Shenyang, Liaoning, China
- Height: 1.85 m (6 ft 1 in)
- Position: Centre-back

Youth career
- 1992–1998: Shenyang Sealion

Senior career*
| Years | Team | Apps | (Gls) |
| 1999–2004 | Shenyang Sealion | 87 | (4) |
| 2005–2007 | Shanghai Shenhua | 36 | (0) |
| 2008 | Wuhan Optics Valley | 7 | (1) |
| 2009 | Shanghai Zobon | 12 | (1) |
| 2010–2011 | Chongqing Lifan | 22 | (3) |
| 2011 | Liaoning Whowin | 5 | (0) |
| 2012 | Hohhot Dongjin | 11 | (2) |

Managerial career
- 2015: Fujian Broncos (Assistant)
- 2016–2017: Liaoning Shenyang Urban (assistant)
- 2018–2019: Fujian Tianxin (assistant)
- 2021: Qingdao Red Lions (assistant)
- 2021–2022: Qingdao Red Lions (caretaker)
- 2022: Qingdao Red Lions
- 2022–2023: Shanghai Jiading Huilong
- 2023–2024: Wuxi Wugo
- 2026: Nanjing City
- * Club domestic league appearances and goals as of 10:33, 25 January 2012 (UTC)

Li Yinan (Chinese: 李毅男; born 25 February 1979) is a Chinese football coach and former player.

As a player he was a centre-back and graduated from the Shenyang Sealion youth team where he spent six seasons with them before joining Shanghai Shenhua. He would also represent Wuhan Optics Valley, Shanghai Zobon, Chongqing Lifan, Liaoning Whowin and Hohhot Dongjin throughout his career.

== Club career ==
Li Yinan played for the Shenyang Sealion youth team until he was promoted to the senior side during the 1999 league season. Under the team's Head coach Valeri Nepomniachi Li began to establish himself within the team during the 2000 league season and even though Valeri Nepomniachi left at the end of the season Li Yinan still continued to progress as a regular within the team. By the 2004 league season he was wanted by Shanghai Shenhua; however Shenyang tried to hold on to him by making him the team's captain. This only delayed his move which happened at the beginning of the 2005 league season and saw him reunite with Valeri Nepomniachi who immediately made him an integral member of the team's defence. The next season, however saw him plagued by injuries and Nepomniachi leaving the club, which resulted in him making only nine appearances. By the 2007 league season the club had merged with Shanghai United and Li saw his playing time shrink even further.

At the beginning of the 2008 league season he left Shanghai to join Wuhan Optics Valley for 1.7 million Yuan; however this move turned out to be a disaster because Li Yinan struggled to even establish himself within the team, before the club were controversially relegated then subsequently disbanded during the Chinese Super League 2008 season after the club's management did not accept the punishment given to them by the Chinese Football Association after a scuffle broke out during a league game against Beijing Guoan on September 27, 2008. Without a club to play for several months he would be unemployed before he joined second-tier football team Shanghai Zobon halfway through the 2009 league season. This would then lead to a move to top-tier side Chongqing Lifan at the beginning of the 2010 league season, where he would quickly establish himself within the team's defense.

== Coaching career ==
On 4 September 2026, Li was named as the head coach of China League One club Nanjing City. He has resigned from the position only one month later.

== Club career stats ==
Last update: 25 January 2013

| Season | Team | Country | Division | Apps | Goals |
|---|---|---|---|---|---|
| 1999 | Shenyang Sealion | China | 1 | 1 | 0 |
| 2000 | Shenyang Sealion | China | 1 | 17 | 1 |
| 2001 | Shenyang Sealion | China | 1 | 9 | 1 |
| 2002 | Shenyang Ginde | China | 1 | 24 | 1 |
| 2003 | Shenyang Ginde | China | 1 | 25 | 1 |
| 2004 | Shenyang Ginde | China | 1 | 11 | 0 |
| 2005 | Shanghai Shenhua | China | 1 | 23 | 0 |
| 2006 | Shanghai Shenhua | China | 1 | 9 | 0 |
| 2007 | Shanghai Shenhua | China | 1 | 4 | 0 |
| 2008 | Wuhan Optics Valley | China | 1 | 7 | 1 |
| 2009 | Shanghai Zobon | China | 2 | 12 | 1 |
| 2010 | Chongqing Lifan | China | 1 | 20 | 3 |
| 2011 | Chongqing Lifan | China | 2 | 2 | 0 |
| 2011 | Liaoning Whowin | China | 1 | 5 | 0 |
| 2012 | Hohhot Dongjin | China | 2 | 11 | 2 |
