= Song Zhenyu =

Chinese footballer

Song Zhenyu 宋振瑜
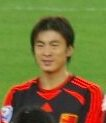

Personal information
- Date of birth: September 21, 1981 (age 45)
- Place of birth: Dalian, China
- Height: 1.91 m (6 ft 3 in)
- Position: Goalkeeper

Youth career
- 1995–1998: Sichuan Quanxing

Senior career*
Years	Team	Apps	(Gls)
1999–2001	Sichuan Quanxing	13	(0)
2002	→ Chongqing Lifan (loan)	3	(0)
2003	→ Dalian Shide (loan)	0	(0)
2004	Dalian Shide	9	(0)
2005	Sichuan Guancheng	25	(0)
2006–2009	Shenyang Ginde	97	(0)
2010–2011	Chengdu Blades	33	(0)
2011–2012	Tianjin Teda	30	(0)
2013–2016	Changchun Yatai	65	(0)
2017–2021	Shaanxi Chang'an Athletic	74	(0)

International career
2008–2009	China	12	(0)
Medal record
Representing China
Men's football
EAFF Championship
Bronze medal – third place	2008 China	Team
- * Club domestic league appearances and goals

Song Zhenyu (Chinese: 宋振瑜; pinyin: Sòng Zhènyú; born September 21, 1981) is a Chinese former footballer who played as a goalkeeper.

== Club career ==
Despite being born in Dalian, Liaoning Song Zhenyu would move to Chengdu in the Sichuan province as a boy where he achieved his dream in becoming a professional footballer when he joined top-tier side Sichuan Quanxing in 1999. For the next two seasons he played understudy to Gao Jianbin and made thirteen league appearances during the periods that Gao Jianbin was injured; however, being unable to permanently claim the first-choice goalkeeping position, Song was loaned out to Chongqing Lifan and his hometown football team Dalian Shide. After his loan period expired with Dalian Shide the club would decide to make a permanent move for Song where he played understudy to An Qi and made nine league appearances.

At the beginning of the 2005 league season Song rejoined his first club Sichuan Quanxing (who had renamed themselves Sichuan Guancheng) and immediately became the team's first-choice goalkeeper and helped guide the club to a ninth-place finish at the end of the season; however this wasn't enough for Sichuan in stopping them disbanding the team. In the 2006 league season Song moved to Shenyang Ginde where he rose to prominence by becoming their first choice goalkeeper. The following season would see him continue his establishment within the team despite the club's decision to move to Changsha and rename themselves Changsha Ginde. In 2008 Song became his country's first choice goalkeeper, then he tended to his wife while she battled and recovered from a brain tumor while also having to help guide Changsha Ginde away from relegation at the end of the season.

By the 2010 league season Song proclaimed his desire to move back to Chengdu with his wife while she gave birth to their child and wanted to join second-tier football team Chengdu Blades. He got his wish when he joined Chengdu Blades on the final day of the transfer deadline and played in twenty-four league games in their successful promotion push to the Chinese Super League. Chengdu Blades would however struggle in the top tier and after a heavy 4-1 defeat to Shanghai Shenhua, Song as well several other first team players would be dropped from the team. Halfway through the league season he joined Tianjin Teda F.C. for 1.5 million RMB where he established himself as the first choice goalkeeper and won the 2011 Chinese FA Cup in his debut season.

On 27 February 2017, Song transferred to China League Two side Shaanxi Chang'an Athletic.

Song retired after the 2021 season.

== International career ==
Song Zhenyu would be called up to the Chinese senior team in 2007 after recently appointed manager Vladimir Petrović decided he was looking for a new goalkeeper. He would fight for the goalkeeping position against Zong Lei and would eventually make his first full international cap for China against Mexico on April 16, 2008 in a 1-0 defeat. Under Petrović's reign Song would become his countries first choice goalkeeper until Gao Hongbo became the Chinese new manager and decided to drop Song from the squad.

== Career statistics ==
Appearances and goals by club, season and competition
Club	Season	League			National Cup		League Cup		Continental		Other		Total	
Club	Season	Division	Apps	Goals	Apps	Goals	Apps	Goals	Apps	Goals	Apps	Goals	Apps	Goals
Sichuan Quanxing	1999	Chinese Jia-A League	0	0		0	-		-		-		0	0
Sichuan Quanxing	2000	Chinese Jia-A League	7	0		0	-		-		-		7	0
Sichuan Quanxing	2001	Chinese Jia-A League	6	0		0	-		-		-		6	0
Sichuan Quanxing	Total		13	0	0	0	0	0	0	0	0	0	13	0
Chongqing Lifan (loan)	2002	Chinese Jia-A League	3	0		0	-		-		-		3	0
Dalian Shide (loan)	2003	Chinese Jia-A League	0	0		0	-		0	0	-		0	0
Dalian Shide	2004	Chinese Super League	9	0		0		0		0	-		9	0
Sichuan Guancheng	2005	Chinese Super League	25	0		0		0	-		-		25	0
Shenyang Ginde	2006	Chinese Super League	26	0		0	-		-		-		26	0
Shenyang Ginde	2007	Chinese Super League	26	0	-		-		-		-		26	0
Shenyang Ginde	2008	Chinese Super League	16	0	-		-		-		-		16	0
Shenyang Ginde	2009	Chinese Super League	29	0	-		-		-		-		29	0
Shenyang Ginde	Total		97	0	0	0	0	0	0	0	0	0	97	0
Chengdu Blades	2010	China League One	24	0	-		-		-		-		24	0
Chengdu Blades	2011	Chinese Super League	9	0	1	0	-		-		-		10	0
Chengdu Blades	Total		33	0	1	0	0	0	0	0	0	0	34	0
Tianjin Teda	2011	Chinese Super League	15	0	3	0	-		-		-		18	0
Tianjin Teda	2012	Chinese Super League	15	0	0	0	-		4	0	1 (Note: Appearances in Chinese FA Super Cup)	0	20	0
Tianjin Teda	Total		30	0	3	0	0	0	4	0	1	0	38	0
Changchun Yatai	2013	Chinese Super League	21	0	0	0	-		-		-		21	0
Changchun Yatai	2014	Chinese Super League	20	0	1	0	-		-		-		21	0
Changchun Yatai	2015	Chinese Super League	19	0	0	0	-		-		-		20	0
Changchun Yatai	2016	Chinese Super League	5	0	0	0	-		-		-		5	0
Changchun Yatai	Total		65	0	1	0	0	0	0	0	0	0	66	0
Shaanxi Chang'an Athletic	2017	China League Two	24	0	1	0	-		-		-		25	0
Shaanxi Chang'an Athletic	2018	China League Two	32	0	2	0	-		-		-		34	0
Shaanxi Chang'an Athletic	2019	China League One	16	0	0	0	-		-		-		16	0
Shaanxi Chang'an Athletic	2020	China League One	2	0	-		-		-		-		2	0
Shaanxi Chang'an Athletic	2021	China League One	0	0	0	0	-		-		-		0	0
Shaanxi Chang'an Athletic	Total		74	0	3	0	0	0	0	0	0	0	77	0
Career total			349	0	8	0	0	0	4	0	1	0	362	0

== Honours ==
Tianjin Teda

- Chinese FA Cup: 2011
