= Chinese Super League =

Highest tier of professional football in China

- Organising body: Chinese Professional Football League
- Founded: 2004; 22 years ago
- Country: China
- Confederation: AFC
- Number of clubs: 16
- Level on pyramid: 1
- Relegation to: China League One
- Domestic cup(s): Chinese FA Cup; Chinese FA Super Cup
- International cup(s): AFC Champions League Elite (1st tier); AFC Champions League Two (2nd tier)
- Current champions: Dalian Yingbo (1st title) (2026)
- Most championships: Guangzhou (8 titles)
- Most appearances: Wang Dalei (454 games)
- Top scorer: Wu Lei (173 goals)
- Broadcasters: CCTV; Migu
- Website: cfl-china.cn
- Current: 2026 Chinese Super League

Chinese Football Super League
- Simplified Chinese: 中国足球超级联赛
- Traditional Chinese: 中國足球超級聯賽
Transcriptions
Standard Mandarin
- Hanyu Pinyin: Zhōngguó zúqiú chāojí liánsài

CSL
- Chinese: 中超
Transcriptions
Standard Mandarin
- Hanyu Pinyin: Zhōngchāo

The Chinese Football Super League (Chinese: 中国足球超级联赛; pinyin: Zhōngguó Zúqiú Chāojí Liánsài), commonly known as the Chinese Super League or the CSL (Chinese: 中超; pinyin: Zhōngchāo), also known as the China Resources Beverage Chinese Football Super League for sponsorship reasons, is a professional association football league in China and the highest level of the Chinese football league system. Governed by the Chinese Football Association and operated by the Chinese Professional Football League (CFL), the league was established in 2004 by the rebranding of the former top division, Chinese Jia-A League.

Initially contested by 12 teams in its inaugural year, the league has since expanded, with 16 teams competing in the 2026 season. A total of 42 teams have competed in the CSL since its inception, with ten of them winning the title: Guangzhou (8), Shandong Taishan (4), Shanghai Port (4), Shenzhen, Dalian Shide, Changchun Yatai, Beijing Guoan, Jiangsu, Wuhan Three Towns, and Dalian Yingbo (1 title each). The current Super League champions are Dalian Yingbo, who won the 2026 edition.

The Chinese Super League is considered the top professional sports league in China. The league recorded an average attendance of 25,755 for league matches in the 2025 season. This was the twelfth-highest of any domestic professional sports league in the world and the sixth-highest of any professional association football league in the world, behind the Bundesliga, the Premier League, La Liga, Serie A and Liga MX.

== Overview ==
=== Competition ===
Unlike many top European leagues like Bundesliga, Premier League, La Liga, and Serie A, the Chinese Super League starts in February or March and ends in November or December. In each season, each club plays each of the other clubs twice, once at home and another away.

With 16 clubs currently in the Chinese Super League in Season 2023, each club plays 30 matches. There are 8 games every round, and a total of 240 games in the season.

The two lowest-placed teams by the end of the season are relegated to the China League One and the top two teams from the League One are promoted, taking their places.

The League position is determined by the highest number of points accumulated during the season. If two or more teams are level on points, tiebreakers are, in the following order

1. Highest number of points accumulated in matches between the teams concerned;
2. Highest goal difference in matches between the teams concerned;
3. Highest number of goals scored in matches between the teams concerned;
4. Highest points accumulated by the reserve teams in the reserve league
5. Highest points accumulated by the U19 teams in the U19 league
6. Highest goal difference;
7. Highest number of goals scored;
8. Fair-Play points (Clubs deduct 1 point for a yellow card, and 3 points for a red card);
9. Draw by lots.

=== Chinese Super League clubs in international competition ===
When the Asian Football Confederation started the AFC Champions League in the 2002–03 season, China was given 2 slots in the competition. Qualification for the AFC Champions League changed in 2009 as AFC distributed 4 slots to China. The top three of the league, as well as the winner of the Chinese FA Cup, qualify for the AFC Champions League of the next year. If the FA Cup finalists finish the league in 3rd or higher, the 4th place team in the league will take the Champions League spot.

Between the 2002–03 and the 2017 season, Chinese clubs won the AFC Champions League two times, behind Korean K-League with five wins, and Japanese J-League with three wins.

=== Development ===
On 17 November 2017, the Vice-president of the CFA, Li Yuyi, disclosed the expansion plan of the top four level leagues of China. The Chinese Super League is planning to expand to 18 clubs, followed by China League One with 20 clubs, China League Two with 32 clubs and the Chinese Football Association Member Association Champions League with 48 clubs.

== History ==
=== Origins ===
Though it could be argued that football was invented by the Chinese, organised league play of association football in China only began in 1951 with the establishment of the Chinese National Football Conference as a round-robin tournament, with 8 teams participating. Development was rapid: in 1954, the competition was renamed the National Football League, in 1956, it was divided into two Divisions, and promotion and relegation between the two tiers started in 1957. In the 1980s, the Chinese Football Association allowed enterprise entities to sponsor and invest in football teams, and as a result, the league entered a semi-pro period in 1987. Sponsored by Goldlion Group, the league played its first-ever home and away season: participating were the top 7 clubs of the 1986 Division 1, together with Liaoning, who were 1985 season champions, but did not compete in 1986 league season due to participating in the Asian Club Championship. The tournament was renamed the National Football League Division 1 Group A, or Chinese Jia-A League for short, and the other 8 clubs of Division 1 and the top 4 clubs from Division 2 participated in the Chinese Jia-B League. The two groups merged in the 1988 season, but divided again in 1989.

In the early 1990s, the CFA began to allow enterprises to purchase football clubs and manage them, whether they were state-owned enterprises or private-owned companies, and in 1992, it was announced that, as part of the sports system reform project, the Chinese Jia-A League would become the country's first professional football league, starting with the 1994 season. All Jia-A clubs were ordered to set up professionally before 1994, and all Jia-B clubs were given an extra year to realise professional structural reform. The Jia-A league achieved success in its early years, but in the late '90s, its management practices received heavy criticism; special attention was paid to the lack of continuity in key policies, as well as a lack of sustainable development in certain member clubs. At the same time, the league was affected by gambling, match-fixing and corruption. As a result, the chaotic state of Jia-A had become a "troubled investment environment," with sponsors and club owners both bowing out. In recognition of the aforementioned, as well as a multitude of other factors, the Chinese Football Association decided to reform the League system, which ultimately led to the creation of the Chinese Super League.

On January 13, 2001, Yan Shiduo, vice-president of the Chinese Football Association, discussed setting up a new professional league system, and in 2002, the CFA announced the establishment of the Chinese Super League, with the first season beginning in 2004. Intending to introduce truly commercial methods and let the professional football market in China operate more freely, the CSL seeks to draw on the experience of professional Leagues in Europe to redesign the league structure and strengthen professionalism.

=== Foundation ===
Compared to the Jia-A, the CSL is a lot more demanding on teams. The CFA and CSL committee imposed a range of minimum criteria to ensure professional management and administration, financial probity, and a youth development program at every club. The CSL published first edition of CSL club criteria in 2002 and revised it several times, club license system was introduced since 2004. Besides the regular professional league, the CSL also has a reserve league, and Youth super league plays in U-19, U-17, U-15, U-14 and U-13 levels.

The CSL and China League One's goals are to promote high-quality and high-level competition, introduce advanced managerial concepts to the market, enforce the delivery of minimum standards of professionalism, encourage an influx of higher-quality foreign coaches and players, and gradually establish the European system for player registrations and transfers.

=== Summary ===
The first CSL season began in 2004, with 12 teams in the league. The inaugural season was plagued with controversy, which continued from the former league, Jia-A, and where, since 1999, scandals such as match-fixing and gambling had been uncovered. This resulted in the loss of interest in the domestic game, low attendances and great financial losses.

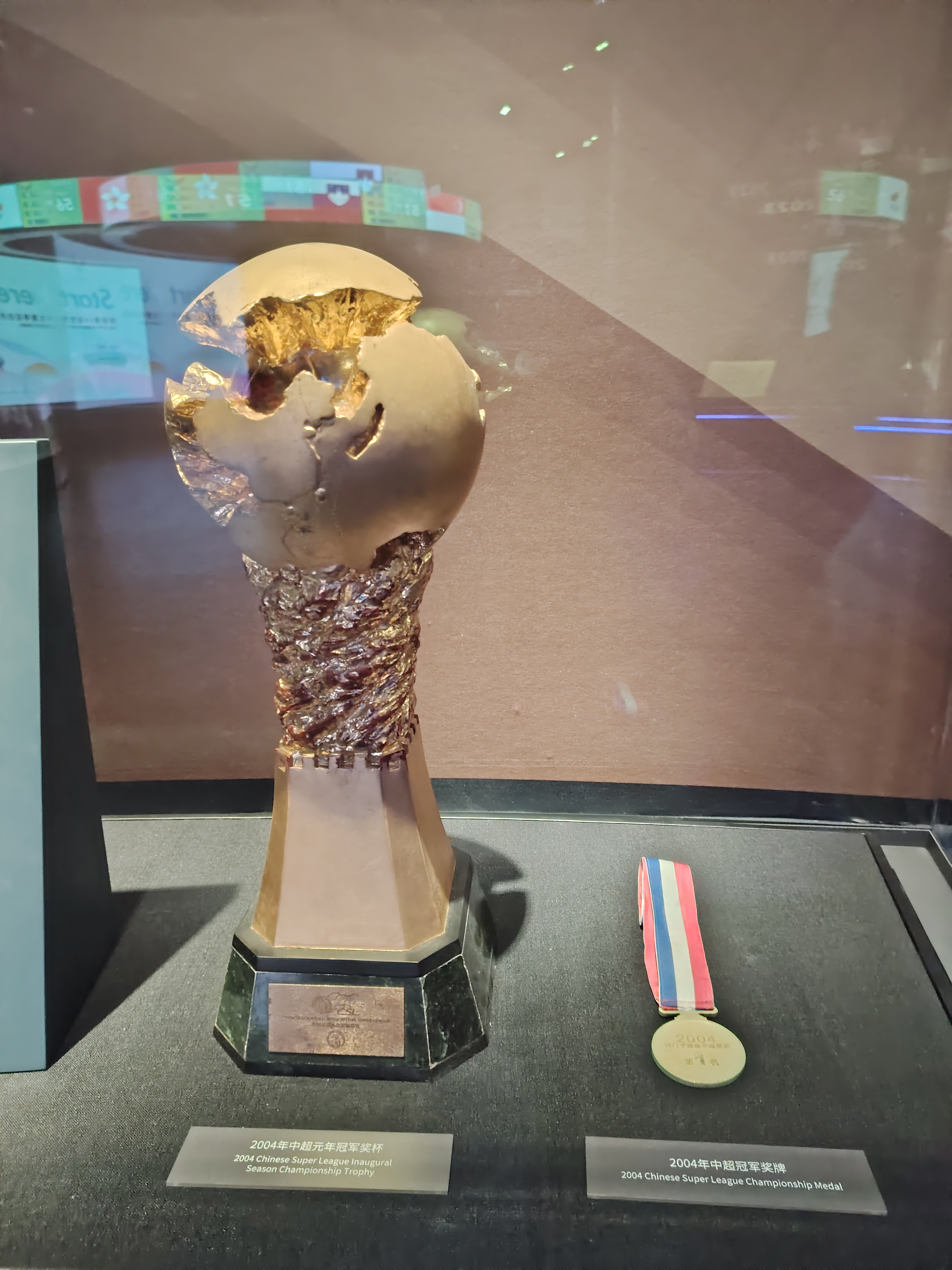
The Chinese Super League trophy

The original plan was to have one relegated team and two promoted teams for the 2004 season and 2005 season, thus increasing the number of teams in 2006 to 14. But the CFA's decisions caused the relegations to be cancelled for these 2 years.

For the 2005 season, the league expanded to 14 teams after Wuhan Huanghelou and Zhuhai Zobon won promotion from China League One. The Zhuhai team, formerly named Zhuhai Anping, had been bought by the Shanghai Zobon real estate company and relocated to Shanghai for the 2005 season, and subsequently renamed to Shanghai Zobon.

In 2006, the league was planned to expand to 16 teams with the newly promoted Xiamen Blue Lions and Changchun Yatai. However, Sichuan First City withdrew before the start of the season, leaving only 15 teams when the season started on March 11. Shanghai Zobon, after another change of ownership, was renamed Shanghai United.

In 2007, the league was again planned to be expanded to 16 teams, but once again it found itself one team short. Shanghai United's owner, Zhu Jun, bought a major share in local rival Shanghai Shenhua and merged the two teams. As a result, Shanghai Shenhua retained its name as it already had a strong fanbase in the city, while Shanghai United pulled out of the league.

In 2008, the season started with 16 clubs participating for the first time, however, Wuhan protested against punishments made by the CFA after a match against Beijing Guoan, and announced its immediate withdrawal from the league, which left the season to finish with 15 clubs.

Since 2009, the league has run with 16 stable clubs participating each year. Two are relegated to China League One, and two are promoted from China League One each season.

In 2010, the CSL was beset by a scandal going right to the top of the CFA. The Chinese government took nationwide action against football gambling, match-fixing and corruption, and former CFA vice presidents Xie Yalong, Nan Yong and Yang Yimin were arrested. On February 22, 2010, CFA relegated Guangzhou Yiyao for match-fixing in 2006 China League One Season, as well as Chengdu Blades for match-fixing in 2007 China League One season.

In 2011, the anti-corruption movement had visibly improved the image of the CSL, with increases to attendance. Clubs such as Guangzhou Evergrande and Shanghai Shenhua began investing heavily in foreign stars. After former Fluminense midfielder Darío Conca transferred in 2011, some notable signings during the 2012 seasons included former Chelsea forward Didier Drogba and Nicolas Anelka, former Barcelona midfielder Seydou Keita and Fábio Rochemback, former Sevilla FC forward Frédéric Kanouté, former Blackburn Rovers forward Yakubu and former Borussia Dortmund forward Lucas Barrios. Former Japan national team coach Takeshi Okada took up the reins as the new coach of Hangzhou Greentown, former Argentina national team coach Sergio Batista replaced Jean Tigana as Shanghai Shenhua's head coach, and former Italy national team and Juventus manager Marcello Lippi replaced Lee Jang-Soo as Guangzhou Evergrande's head coach.

In 2012, Guangzhou Evergrande became the first Chinese team to defend their CSL title, and to win consecutive titles. However, eight-time champions of Professional League, Dalian Shide, had seriously financial problems during the entire season, especially after the arrest of club owner Xu Ming. They had planned to merge with Dalian Aerbin, the other CSL club of the city, but the Chinese Football Association blocked the merger at the end, as Dalian Shide failed to cancel their registration as a CSL club before the merger. So Aerbin effectively purchased and swallowed up Shide, including the club's famed academy and training facilities. Dalian Shide was officially dissolved on 31 January 2013. The country's most successful club had ceased to exist.

In 2013, David Beckham became first global ambassador for CSL. In February 2013, Shanghai Shenhua was stripped of its 2003 Chinese Ji-A league title as part of a broad match-fixing crackdown. In total, 12 clubs were handed punishments, while 33 people, including former CFA vice-president Xie Yalong and Nan Yong, received life bans. Also in 2013, Guangzhou Evergrande Taobao won the Asian Champions League title, the first time a Chinese Super League team has won that award.

In 2014, Guangzhou Evergrande became the first Chinese club to win four consecutive professional league titles.

In 2015, ex-Tottenham midfielder Paulinho moved to Guangzhou Evergrande at the age of 27, Guangzhou Evergrande become AFC champions League champions for second time.

In 2016, the Chinese super league became a rising power in the global transfer market. Brazil international Ramires, Colombia international Jackson Martinez and Fredy Guarin were among the notable signings, while Pavel Nedvěd was appointed as second global ambassador for CSL.

2017 saw the Chinese Super League (CSL) catapulted to global attention. Players such as Oscar, Carlos Tevez, Ricardo Carvalho, Alexandre Pato and Mikel John Obi all moved east during the year. Guangzhou Evergrande won their 7th consecutive league title.

2018, in the 28th round of the 2018 Chinese Super League, the two title favourites Shanghai SIPG and Guangzhou Evergrande Taobao clashed head-to-head, with Shanghai SIPG coming away with 5 - 4 hard win over Guangzhou Evergrande Taobao to open up the points gap with Guangzhou Evergrande Taobao. At last, Shanghai SIPG won the 2018 Chinese Super League Champion, thus breaking Guangzhou Evergrande Taobao's 7-year monopoly of the Chinese Super League.

At the 2019 CSL Mobilization Meeting, the CFA Referees Committee officially announced that a professional referee system will be introduced in the CSL in 2019, with two foreign referees including Mark Clattenburg, Milorad Mažić, and three local referees to be officially hired as the first professional referees in the history of Chinese football. The two foreign professional referees will be mainly responsible for enforcing the Chinese Super League, but will also provide coaching and training for local referees.

Affected by COVID-19, the 2020 season was postponed to July 25. The 16 teams were divided into two groups to play in Suzhou and Dalian. This year's league was temporarily changed to a "Group stage + Knockout" format and adopted a tournament system.

In 2022, Chinese Communist Party (CCP) officials launched an anti-corruption probe resulting in eight footballing officials being investigated for "suspected of violations of discipline and law". In August 2024, former CCP Committee Secretary of the CFA, Du Zhaocai, pleaded guilty to accepting more than US$6.1 million in bribes. On 10 September 2024, CFA banned 38 players, including former nationals, Jin Jingdao, Guo Tianyu, and five officials for life over allegations of match-fixing and other forms of corruption. Other players and officials were also given shorter five years bans. Nine Chinese Super League clubs were also punished with point deductions for the 2026 Chinese Super League and fines. The clubs were docked between five and ten points.

== Cooperation structure ==
The preparatory committee of the Chinese Professional Football League was established on May 27, 2016, with members from 5 CSL clubs, 3 CL1 clubs and 2 CL2 clubs, includes two CFA representatives. The blueprint is to have all of the three professional level leagues of China, the Chinese Super League, China Football League one and China Football League two separated from the League structure of the CFA. The PFL will be a private company wholly owned by its Member Clubs who make up the League at any one time. Each club is a shareholder, with one vote each on issues such as rule changes and contracts. The newly formed PFL would have commercial independence from The CFA, giving the PFL licence to negotiate its own broadcast and sponsorship agreements.

The CFA will no longer hold any shares of the League, but as the national governing body for football in China, the CFA is responsible for sanctioning competition Rule Books, and regulating on-field matters. It also organises The CFA Cup competition, in which PFL Member Clubs compete and the lower division leagues ranked after CL2, under a specific agreement between CFA and PFL. The CFA also has the ability to exercise a vote on certain specific issues, but has no role in the day-to-day running of the CSL, CL1 and CL2.

On January 3, 2017, the CFA announced that Chinese Professional Football League, formed as a limited company, will be established in March 2017, the CSL and CL1 clubs will be found members of the PFL starts from 2017, with CL2 planning to join the system by 2019. The PFL preparatory committee will discuss and establish the regulations and the structures of the PFL, holding the elections of the PFL president in January and February 2017. However, after a series of meetings includes CFA officers and club owners, the plan had been put on hold.

On 23 January 2025, the company was officially founded as the sole management company of professional league in China.

== Champions ==
Season	Champions	Runners-up
2004	Shenzhen Jianlibao	Shandong Luneng
2005	Dalian Shide	Shanghai Shenhua
2006	Shandong Luneng	Shanghai Shenhua
2007	Changchun Yatai	Beijing Guoan
2008	Shandong Luneng (2)	Shanghai Shenhua
2009	Beijing Guoan	Changchun Yatai
2010	Shandong Luneng (3)	Tianjin TEDA
2011	Guangzhou Evergrande	Beijing Guoan
2012	Guangzhou Evergrande (2)	Jiangsu Sainty
2013	Guangzhou Evergrande (3)	Shandong Luneng
2014	Guangzhou Evergrande (4)	Beijing Guoan
2015	Guangzhou Evergrande (5)	Shanghai SIPG
2016	Guangzhou Evergrande (6)	Jiangsu Suning
2017	Guangzhou Evergrande (7)	Shanghai SIPG
2018	Shanghai SIPG	Guangzhou Evergrande
2019	Guangzhou Evergrande (8)	Beijing Guoan
2020	Jiangsu Suning	Guangzhou Evergrande
2021	Shandong Taishan (4)	Shanghai Port
2022	Wuhan Three Towns	Shandong Taishan
2023	Shanghai Port (2)	Shandong Taishan
2024	Shanghai Port (3)	Shanghai Shenhua
2025	Shanghai Port (4)	Shanghai Shenhua
2026	Dalian Yingbo	Chengdu Rongcheng

=== Performances by club ===
Clubs in bold compete in the 2027 CSL season. Italics indicates defunct club.

Club	Champions	Runners-up	Winning seasons	Runners-up seasons
Guangzhou	8	2	2011, 2012, 2013, 2014, 2015, 2016, 2017, 2019	2018, 2020
**Shandong Taishan**	4	4	2006, 2008, 2010, 2021	2004, 2013, 2022, 2023
**Shanghai Port**	4	3	2018, 2023, 2024, 2025	2015, 2017, 2021
**Beijing Guoan**	1	4	2009	2007, 2011, 2014, 2019
Jiangsu	1	2	2020	2012, 2016
Changchun Yatai	1	1	2007	2009
Shenzhen	1	0	2004	
Dalian Shide	1	0	2005	
Wuhan Three Towns	1	0	2022	
**Dalian Yingbo**	1	0	2026	
**Shanghai Shenhua**	0	5		2005, 2006, 2008, 2024, 2025
**Tianjin Jinmen Tiger**	0	1		2010
**Chengdu Rongcheng**	0	1		2026

== Clubs ==
=== Current clubs ===
Locations of the 2026 Chinese Super League teams

Club		Location	Stadium	Capacity	Seasons	N° of seasons	Best finish	Worst finish	Current spell	Head coach
English name	Chinese name	Location	Stadium	Capacity	Seasons	N° of seasons	Best finish	Worst finish	Current spell	Head coach
Beijing Guoan	北京国安	Beijing	Workers' Stadium	68,000	2004 to 2025	22	1st (2009)	9th (2017)	from 2004	(Scotland) Nick Montgomery
Chongqing Tonglianglong	重庆铜梁龙	Chongqing	Tongliang Long Stadium	20,000	2026	0			from 2026	(Spain) Salva Suay
Chengdu Rongcheng	成都蓉城	Chengdu	Phoenix Hill Football Stadium	50,695	2022 to 2025	4	3rd (2024)	5th (2022)	from 2022	(South Korea) Seo Jung-won
Dalian Yingbo	大连英博	Dalian	Dalian Suoyuwan Football Stadium	63,671	2025	1	11th (2025)	none	from 2025	(China) Li Guoxu
Henan	河南	Zhengzhou	Hanghai Stadium	29,860	2007 to 2012; 2014 to 2025	18	3rd (2009)	16th (2012)	from 2014	(South Korea) Nam Ki-il
Liaoning Tieren	辽宁铁人	Shenyang	Tiexi Stadium	40,000	2026	0			from 2026	(China) Li Jinyu
Qingdao Hainiu	青岛海牛	Qingdao	Qingdao Youth Football Stadium	50,000	2004 to 2013; 2023 to 2025	13	6th (2011)	15th (2013)	from 2023	(China) Li Xiaopeng
Qingdao West Coast	青岛西海岸	Qingdao	Qingdao West Coast University City Sports Center	27,000	2024 to 2025	2	9th (2025)	10th (2024)	from 2024	(China) Shao Jiayi
Shandong Taishan	山东泰山	Jinan	Jinan Olympic Sports Center Stadium	56,808	2004 to 2025	22	1st (2006, 2008, 2010, 2021)	14th (2016)	from 2004	(South Korea) Choi Kang-hee
Shanghai Port	上海海港	Shanghai	Pudong Football Stadium	37,000	2013 to 2025	13	1st (2018, 2023, 2024)	9th (2013)	from 2013	(Australia) Kevin Muscat
Shanghai Shenhua	上海申花	Shanghai	Shanghai Stadium	72,436	2004 to 2025	22	2nd (2005, 2006, 2008, 2024)	13th (2019)	from 2004	(Russia) Leonid Slutsky
Shenzhen Peng City	深圳新鹏城	Shenzhen	Shenzhen Stadium	45,000	2024 to 2025	2	12th (2025)	14th (2024)	from 2024	(Italy) Christian Lattanzio
Tianjin Jinmen Tiger	天津津门虎	Tianjin	TEDA Soccer Stadium	36,390	2004 to 2025	22	2nd (2010)	14th (2018)	from 2004	(China) Yu Genwei
Wuhan Three Towns	武汉三镇	Wuhan	Wuhan Sports Center	56,201	2022 to 2025	4	1st (2022)	11th (2024)	from 2022	(Portugal) Filipe Martins
Yunnan Yukun	云南玉昆	Yuxi	Yuxi Plateau Sports Center Stadium	30,500	2025	1	8th (2025)	none	from 2025	(Norway) Jørn Andersen
Zhejiang Professional	浙江	Hangzhou	Huanglong Sports Center	51,971	2007 to 2016; 2022 to 2025	14	3rd (2022, 2023)	15th (2009, 2016)	from 2022	(Australia) Ross Aloisi

=== Former clubs ===
Club		Home City	Stadium	Capacity	Seasons in CSL	Best finish	Worst finish	Current league
English name	Chinese name	Home City	Stadium	Capacity	Seasons in CSL	Best finish	Worst finish	Current league
Meizhou Hakka	梅州客家	Wuhua County	Wuhua County Olympic Sports Centre	27,000	2022 to 2025	9th (2022)	15th (2024, 2025)	China League One
Changchun Yatai	长春亚泰	Changchun	Changchun Stadium	41,638	2006 to 2018; 2021 to 2025	1st (2007)	16th (2025)	China League One
Nantong Zhiyun	南通支云	Rugao	Rugao Olympic Sports Center	14,603	2023 to 2024	14th (2023)	16th (2024)	China League One
Guangzhou	广州	Guangzhou	Tianhe Stadium	54,856	2008 to 2009, 2011 to 2022	1st (2011 to 2017, 2019)	17th (2022)	Defunct
Cangzhou Mighty Lions	沧州雄狮	Cangzhou	Cangzhou Stadium	31,836	2015 to 2016; 2020 to 2025	7th (2015)	16th (2016, 2020)	Defunct
Dalian Professional	大连人	Dalian	Dalian Barracuda Bay Football Stadium	63,000	2012 to 2014, 2018 to 2023	5th (2012, 2013)	15th (2014, 2021, 2023)	Defunct
Shenzhen	深圳	Shenzhen	Shenzhen Universiade Sports Centre	60,334	2004 to 2011, 2019 to 2023	1st (2004)	16th (2011, 2023)	Defunct
Guangzhou City	广州城	Guangzhou	Yuexiushan Stadium	18,000	2004 to 2010, 2012 to 2022	3rd (2014)	16th (2010)	Defunct
Wuhan Yangtze River	武汉长江	Wuhan	Wuhan Five Rings Sports Center	30,000	2013, 2019 to 2022	6th (2019)	16th (2013, 2022)	Defunct
Hebei	河北	Langfang	Langfang Stadium	30,040	2016 to 2022	4th (2017)	18th (2022)	Defunct
Chongqing Liangjiang Athletic	重庆两江竞技	Chongqing	Chongqing Olympic Sports Center	58,680	2004 to 2006, 2009 to 2010, 2015 to 2021	6th (2020)	16th (2009)	Defunct
Qingdao	青岛	Qingdao	Conson Stadium	45,000	2020 to 2021	14th (2020)	16th (2021)	Defunct
Jiangsu	江苏	Nanjing	Nanjing Olympic Sports Centre	61,443	2009 to 2020	1st (2020)	13th (2013)	Defunct
Beijing Renhe	北京人和	Beijing	Beijing Fengtai Stadium	31,043	2004 to 2015; 2018 to 2019	3rd (2004)	16th (2019)	Defunct
Tianjin Tianhai	天津天海	Tianjin	Tianjin Olympic Center Stadium	60,000	2017 to 2019	3rd (2017)	14th (2019)	Defunct
Guizhou F.C.	贵州恒丰	Guiyang	Guiyang Olympic Sports Center	51,636	2017 to 2018	8th (2017)	16th (2018)	Defunct
Liaoning F.C.	辽宁宏运	Shenyang	Tiexi New District Sports Center	30,000	2004 to 2008; 2010 to 2017	3rd (2011)	16th (2017)	Defunct
Yanbian Funde	延边富德	Yanji	Yanji Stadium	30,000	2016 to 2017	9th (2016)	15th (2017)	Defunct
Shanghai Shenxin	上海申鑫	Jinshan	Jinshan Football Stadium	30,000	2010 to 2015	7th (2013)	16th (2015)	Defunct
Shaoxing Keqiao Yuejia	绍兴柯桥越甲	Shaoxing	China Textile City Sports Center	20,000	2014	16th (2014)		Defunct
Dalian Shide	大连实德	Dalian	Dalian Jinzhou Stadium	30,776	2004 to 2012	1st (2005)	14th (2008, 2012)	Defunct
Chengdu Tiancheng	成都天诚	Chengdu	Shuangliu Sports Center	26,000	2008 to 2009, 2011	9th (2009)	15th (2011)	Defunct
Wuhan Optics Valley	武汉光谷	Wuhan	Wuhan Sports Center	54,000	2005 to 2008	5th (2005)	16th (2008)	Defunct
Xiamen Blue Lions	厦门蓝狮	Xiamen	Xiamen People's Stadium	32,000	2006 to 2007	8th (2006)	15th (2007)	Defunct
Shanghai United	上海联城	Shanghai	Yuanshen Sports Centre Stadium	16,000	2005 to 2006	7th (2006)	11th (2005)	Defunct
Sichuan First City	四川冠城	Chengdu	Chengdu Sports Centre	39,225	2004 to 2005	9th (2004, 2005)		Defunct

=== Rivalries ===
There are several key rivalries and local derbies that have formed in the Chinese Super League, including:

Jing–Hu rivalry

- 2004–present: Beijing Guoan v Shanghai Shenhua

Jing–Jin rivalry

- 2004–present: Beijing Guoan v Tianjin Jinmen Tiger

Shanghai derby

- Matches between Inter Shanghai, Shanghai Shenhua, Shanghai United, Shanghai Shenxin, and Shanghai Port

Guangzhou derby

- 2012–2022: Guangzhou v Guangzhou City

Dalian derby

- 2012: Dalian Shide v Dalian Aerbin

Tianjin derby

- 2017–2019: Tianjin Teda v Tianjin Tianhai

Beijing derby

- 2018–2019: Beijing Guoan v Beijing Renhe

Wuhan derby

- 2022: Wuhan Three Towns v Wuhan Yangtze River

Qingdao derby

- 2024–2026: Qingdao Hainiu v Qingdao West Coast

== Players ==
=== Player salaries and transfers ===
Professional footballers in China receive relatively high salaries when compared to other Chinese sports leagues and football leagues in other countries. The average salary for CSL players is $1,016,579 in 2017, it is ranked at eleventh place among all of the professional sports leagues and the sixth-highest of any professional association football league in the world.

CSL has two transfer windows—the primary pre-season transfer window lasts two months from January to February, and the secondary mid season transfer window runs one month from mid June to mid July. As of the 2018 season, the CSL introduced new rules mandating that each club must register a maximum 31-man squad, with 27 Chinese Players, including a player from Hong Kong, Macau and Chinese Taipei, and 4 foreign players. In the transfer window clubs could sign 5 Chinese players at any age, plus 3 under 21 Chinese players; clubs could register 4 foreign players in the winter transfer, and replace two of them in the summer transfer.

The record transfer fee for a CSL player has risen rapidly since the investment boost started in 2015. The six most expensive transfers with players coming to CSL have exceeded €30 million, with Chelsea selling Oscar to Shanghai SIPG in December 2016 for a fee of €60 million, Zenit Saint Petersburg selling Hulk to Shanghai SIPG for €55.8 million in July 2016, Shakhtar Donetsk selling Alex Teixeira to Jiangsu Suning for €50 million in February 2016, Atlético Madrid selling Jackson Martínez to Guangzhou Evergrande for €42 million in February 2016, Villarreal selling Cédric Bakambu to Beijing Guoan for €40 million in February 2018, Atlético Madrid selling Yannick Carrasco to Dalian Yifang for €30 million in February 2018. Guangzhou Evergrande's sale of Paulinho to Barcelona for €40 million in 2017 broke the record for a CSL player transfer to other leagues. Transfer fees for domestic players also increased dramatically. Beijing Guoan sold Chinese International Zhang Chengdong to Hebei China Fortune for ¥15 million in January 2017, breaking the domestic transfer record for Chinese players.

The Chinese Football Association introduced a new transfer tax to restrict transfer spending. On June 20, 2017, CFA announced that any club that pays more than ¥45 million for a foreign player transfer or ¥20 million for a Chinese player transfer must pay the same amount to a CFA youth development fund.

In December 2020, the CFA imposed a salary cap on the Super League. Starting with the 2021 season, total player wages are capped at ¥600 million, with a separate limit of €10 million for foreign players. Individual player salaries are also capped, at ¥5 million before tax for Chinese players and €3 million for foreign players.

=== Foreign player policy ===
In early years, numerous players from Eastern Europe, Africa and Latin America regions were signed as the foreign players in the Chinese league. Steadily, a lot of players transferred to China from major European and South American Leagues. The league has rules, at present, restricting the number of foreign players strictly to four per team. A team could use a maximum of three foreign players on the field each game. This is to promote native player improvement and to conform to rules regarding international club competitions in the AFC. Between 2009 and 2017, there was an additional slot for a player from AFC countries. During the middle of the 2012 season, it was decided that teams that were competing in the AFC Champions League were allowed to have two extra foreign players, which can bring the number of foreigners on a team's seven; however, the policy was removed in the 2013 season.

Season	Squad	Match	On-field	Note
1994–2000	3	3	3	
2001–2003	4	4	3	From 2001, foreign goalkeepers were restricted to play in matches.
2004–2006	3	3	2	
2007–2008	4	4	3	
2009–2016	4+1	4+1	3+1	"+1" refers to the AFC quota. Teams may add a player from another country within the AFC; examples include Bhutan, Maldives, and Nepal.
2017	4+1	3	3	Teams can use three foreign players at most in a match.
2018–2019.7	4	3	3	Teams can use three foreign players at most in a match. The number of foreign players on-field in one match must be no more than the number of U-23 domestic players.
2019.7–2019.12	4	4	3	
2020–2023	5	5	4	
2024–	5	5	5	

=== Hong Kong, Macau and Taiwanese players ===
Policy for Hong Kong, Macau and Taiwanese players has changed continuously. Players from Hong Kong Football Association were considered foreigners at the beginning of 2009, but the league held back the change until the summer transfer window. After the 2010 season, players from Macau Football Association and Chinese Taipei Football Association (except goalkeepers) were not considered foreigners in CSL matches, but will be regarded as foreigners in AFC competitions. In the 2015 season, players who had not played for the Hong Kong national football team, Macau national football team or the Chinese Taipei national football team were no longer deemed native players. In the 2016 and 2017 season, players from the three associations whose contract was signed after 1 January 2016 were no longer deemed native players. From the 2018 season, a club could register one non-naturalized player from the three associations as a native player. According to the Chinese FA, a non-naturalized player refers to someone who was first registered as a professional footballer in the three football associations. Furthermore, Hong Kong or Macau players must be of Chinese descent of Hong Kong or Macau permanent resident, and Taiwanese players must be citizens of Taiwan.

=== Most goals and appearances ===
Most goals
Rank	Name	Years	Goals	Apps	Ratio
1	(China) **Wu Lei**	2013-2018, 2022-	173	274	0.63
2	(China) **Elkeson**	2013–2021, 2023-	131	218	0.6
3	(China) Gao Lin	2005-2009, 2011-2022	100	365	0.27
4	(Israel) Eran Zahavi	2016–2020	91	105	0.87
4	(China) Han Peng	2004–2018	87	303	0.32
5	(Brazil) Ricardo Goulart	2015-2021	82	135	0.61
6	(China) Li Jinyu	2004–2010	73	151	0.48
7	(Colombia) Giovanni Moreno	2012–2022	66	195	0.32
8	(China) Qu Bo	2004–2014, 2016	63	244	0.26
9	(China) Jiang Ning	2004–2019, 2023-2024	62	304	0.2
9	(China) Xu Liang	2004–2006, 2008–2014	62	244	0.25
9	(Honduras) Luis Ramírez	2006, 2008–2009, 2010–2011	62	143	0.43

**Bold** denotes players still playing in the CSL.

Most appearances
Rank	Name	Years	Apps
1	(China) Wang Song	2004-2005, 2008-2019, 2023	393
2	(China) Gao Lin	2005-2009, 2011-2022	365
3	(China) Yang Zhi	2005–2019	350
4	(China) Zhang Yaokun	2004–2016	334
5	(China) Liu Jianye	2005–2021	325
6	(China) Xu Yunlong	2004–2016	315
6	(China) Zhang Xiaofei	2004–2019	315
8	(China) Bai Yuefeng	2006–2023	313
9	(China) Wang Yun	2004–2019	306
10	(China) Jiang Ning	2004–2019, 2023-2024	304

**Bold** denotes players still playing in the CSL.

== Head coaches ==
In early years Chinese and Serbian coaches achieved success in the Chinese Super League. Just like the Jia-A period, the majority of foreign coaches were from countries like Serbia, Croatia and South Korea. Nowadays most CSL clubs appoint coaches from Western Europe and South America. Guangzhou Evergrande were the first side to spend big to bring in European and South American coaches. World Cup winning managers Marcello Lippi and Luiz Felipe Scolari had successful experiences at Guangzhou Evergrande. Famous coaches who have coached in China include Fabio Capello, Felix Magath, Manuel Pellegrini, Dan Petrescu, André Villas-Boas, Cuca, Sven-Göran Eriksson, Sergio Batista, Radomir Antić.

Winning head coaches
Head coach	Club	Wins	Winning years
(Italy) Marcello Lippi	Guangzhou Evergrande Taobao	3	2012, 2013, 2014
(Brazil) Luiz Felipe Scolari	Guangzhou Evergrande Taobao	3	2015, 2016, 2017
(Serbia) Ljubiša Tumbaković	Shandong Luneng Taishan	2	2006, 2008
(China) Zhu Guanghu	Shenzhen Jianlibao	1	2004
(Serbia) Vladimir Petrović	Dalian Shide	1	2005
(China) Gao Hongbo	Changchun Yatai	1	2007
(China) Hong Yuanshuo	Beijing Guoan	1	2009
(Croatia) Branko Ivanković	Shandong Luneng Taishan	1	2010
(South Korea) Lee Jang-soo	Guangzhou Evergrande	1	2011
(Portugal) Vítor Pereira	Shanghai SIPG	1	2018
(Italy) Fabio Cannavaro	Guangzhou Evergrande Taobao	1	2019
(Romania) Cosmin Olăroiu	Jiangsu Suning	1	2020
(China) Hao Wei	Shandong Taishan	1	2021
(Spain) Pedro Morilla	Wuhan Three Towns	1	2022
(Spain) Javier Pereira	Shanghai Port	1	2023
(Australia) Kevin Muscat	Shanghai Port	1	2024

Current head coaches
Nat.	Name	Club	Appointed	Time in charge
(Australia)	Kevin Muscat	Shanghai Port	1 January 2024	2 years, 317 days
(China)	Han Peng	Shandong Taishan	14 July 2025	1 year, 123 days
(Spain)	Jordi Vinyals	Zhejiang	1 January 2021	5 years, 317 days
(South Korea)	Seo Jung-won	Chengdu Rongcheng	12 December 2020	5 years, 337 days
(Russia)	Leonid Slutsky	Shanghai Shenhua	1 January 2024	2 years, 317 days
(Spain)	Quique Setién	Beijing Guoan	10 December 2024	1 year, 339 days
(Spain)	Ricardo Rodríguez	Wuhan Three Towns	5 January 2024	2 years, 313 days
(China)	Yu Genwei	Tianjin Jinmen Tiger	26 March 2021	5 years, 233 days
(China)	Xie Hui	Changchun Yatai	17 April 2024	2 years, 211 days
(South Korea)	Nam Ki-il	Henan	8 January 2024	2 years, 310 days
(Serbia)	Milan Ristić	Meizhou Hakka	12 June 2024	2 years, 155 days
(China)	Zhao Junzhe	Cangzhou Mighty Lions	23 February 2023	3 years, 264 days
(Bulgaria)	Yasen Petrov	Qingdao Hainiu	25 December 2023	2 years, 324 days
(Portugal)	David Patrício	Nantong Zhiyun	25 June 2024	2 years, 142 days
(Spain)	Jesús Tato	Shenzhen Peng City	21 April 2023	3 years, 207 days
(Japan)	Hisashi Kurosaki	Qingdao West Coast	2 January 2024	2 years, 316 days

Most games managed
Rank	Manager	Games	Club(s)
1	(China) Ma Lin	245	Liaoning FC (2004, 2008, 2010–2013, 2015–2017); Chongqing Lifan (2005); Dalian Yifang (2014)
2	(China) Shen Xiangfu	203	Beijing Guoan (2005–2006); Guangzhou Pharmaceutical (2008–2009); Changchun Yatai (2010–2011); Henan Jianye (2012); Shanghai Shenhua (2013–2014)
3	(Serbia) Ljubiša Tumbaković	178	Shandong Luneng Taishan (2004–2009); Wuhan Zall (2013)
4	(China) Gao Hongbo	160	Xiamen Lanshi (2006); Changchun Yatai (2007–2008); Guizhou Renhe (2011–2012); Shanghai East Asia (2013); Jiangsu Sainty (2013–2015)
5	(China) Jia Xiuquan	152	Henan Jianye (2008, 2014–2017); Shanghai Shenhua (2008–2009)
5	(China) Tang Yaodong	152	Liaoning FC (2005–2007); Henan Jianye (2008–2010, 2014)
6	(South Korea) Chang Woe-ryong	149	Qingdao Jonoon (2011, 2012–2013); Dalian Aerbin (2011); Chongqing Lifan (2016–2017, 2019–2022); Henan Jianye (2018)
7	(South Korea) Lee Jang-soo	148	Beijing Guoan (2006–2009); Guangzhou Evergrande (2011–2012); Changchun Yatai (2016–2017); Shenzhen (2022)
9	(Netherlands) Arie Haan	137	Chongqing Lifan (2009); Tianjin Teda (2010–2011, 2014–2015)
10	(China) Zhu Jiong	136	Shanghai Shenxin (2010–2013); Guizhou Renhe (2014–2015)
Statistics correct as of the end of the 2022 Chinese Super League

== Attendance ==
The Chinese Super League has the highest average attendance of any football league in Asia. However, stadiums have capacity restrictions.

=== Season averages ===
Season	Total attendance	Games	Average	Change	High avg.	Team	No. Of Clubs	Relegation Slots
2004	1,430,600	132	10,838	-63.4%	23,636	Shandong Luneng Taishan	12	-
2005	1,871,700	182	10,284	-5.4%	26,000	Shandong Luneng Taishan	14	-
2006	2,228,300	210	10,611	+3.2%	30,679	Shandong Luneng Taishan	15	1
2007	3,173,500	210	15,112	+42.4%	24,643	Shanxi Chanba	15	1
2008	3,065,280	228	13,444	-12.4%	26,501	Shandong Luneng Taishan	16	2
2009	3,854,115	240	16,059	+19.5%	36,805	Beijing Guoan	16	2
2010	3,499,304	240	14,581	-9.2%	33,342	Beijing Guoan	16	2
2011	4,236,322	240	17,651	+21.1%	45,666	Guangzhou Evergrande	16	2
2012	4,497,578	240	18,740	+6.2%	37,250	Guangzhou Evergrande	16	2
2013	4,456,977	240	18,571	-0.9%	40,428	Guangzhou Evergrande	16	2
2014	4,556,520	240	18,986	+2.2%	42,154	Guangzhou Evergrande	16	2
2015	5,326,304	240	22,193	+16.8%	45,889	Guangzhou Evergrande Taobao	16	2
2016	5,798,135	240	24,159	+8.8%	44,883	Guangzhou Evergrande Taobao	16	2
2017	5,703,871	240	23,766	−1.6%	45,587	Guangzhou Evergrande Taobao	16	2
2018	5,785,766	240	24,107	+1.4%	47,002	Guangzhou Evergrande Taobao	16	2
2019	5,595,368	240	23,341	−3.1%	45,795	Guangzhou Evergrande Taobao	16	2
2020	91,205	160	570	−97.6%			16	2
2021	198,418	176	1,127	+97.7%			16	2
2022	287,911	306-8	966	−14.3%			18	3
2023	4,767,836	240	19,866	+19.56%	43,769	Beijing Guoan	16	2
2024	4,663,507	240	19,431	−2.2%	46,444	Beijing Guoan	16	2
2025	6,181,090	240	25,755	+32.5%	58,268	Dalian Yingbo	16	2

=== Attendance by clubs ===
This table lists average attendances of clubs yearly, but only for seasons when that club played in the top division. Clubs are listed with their current names.

Team	Crowd average															
Team	2004	2005	2006	2007	2008	2009	2010	2011	2012	2013	2014	2015	2016	2017	2018	2019
Beijing Guoan	10,864	18,923	13,571	21,571	14,641	36,805	33,342	40,397	36,879	39,269	39,395	40,997	38,114	34,684	41,743	41,801
Beijing Renhe	8,455	4,385	17,286	24,643	24,625	23,026	28,053	27,836	29,574	21,312	12,327	15,139	–	–	12,534	8,104
Changchun Yatai	–	–	8,607	16,429	5,797	12,179	10,067	13,835	12,701	12,975	12,886	14,855	15,335	16,477	18,819	–
Chongqing Dangdai Lifan	15,727	5,731	6,536	–	–	11,440	11,433	–	–	–	–	37,595	36,178	34,439	32,434	30,901
Chengdu Blades	–	–	–	–	12,378	11,873	–	6,443	–	–	–	–	–	–	–	–
Dalian Yifang	–	–	–	–	–	–	–	–	15,774	10,538	10,993	–	–	–	33,145	32,853
Dalian Shide	11,273	14,000	5,043	10,286	7,900	16,613	12,307	17,148	11,093	–	–	–	–	–	–	–
Guangzhou Evergrande Taobao	–	–	–	–	19,624	20,057	–	45,666	37,250	40,428	42,154	45,889	44,883	45,587	47,002	45,795
Guangzhou City	5,000	2,077	2,750	10,571	6,645	8,498	10,152	–	8,460	10,384	11,487	7,989	9,831	9,904	10,321	10,470
Guizhou Hengfeng	–	–	–	–	–	–	–	–	–	–	–	–	–	21,102	16,703	–
Hebei China Fortune	–	–	–	–	–	–	–	–	–	–	–	–	18,469	18,054	16,029	17,739
Henan Jianye	–	–	–	16,857	16,267	19,255	18,630	16,334	17,526	–	18,390	20,207	17,282	18,933	18,402	20,360
Jiangsu Suning	–	–	–	–	–	15,976	10,667	17,170	31,163	28,808	24,349	26,858	38,992	32,697	32,508	27,508
Liaoning Whowin	7,727	11,000	6,929	15,929	11,733	–	10,100	19,621	18,638	20,850	12,781	12,788	22,506	12,429	–	–
Qingdao Jonoon	4,645	4,500	6,071	7,179	6,600	8,774	6,247	8,464	9,538	8,284	–	–	–	–	–	–
Shandong Luneng Taishan	23,636	26,000	30,679	22,607	26,501	17,015	15,901	12,112	20,148	27,683	23,931	22,559	18,932	30,283	24,785	21,019
Shanghai Greenland Shenhua	13,636	12,462	12,786	11,393	11,510	12,627	12,963	9,828	14,761	12,739	15,417	19,506	22,690	19,021	21,480	21,834
Shanghai Shenxin	–	–	–	–	–	–	11,680	10,462	11,597	8,559	10,115	7,028	–	–	–	–
Shanghai SIPG	–	–	–	–	–	–	–	–	–	10,161	12,460	26,381	28,040	29,174	21,631	21,846
Shanghai United	–	4,885	2,193	–	–	–	–	–	–	–	–	–	–	–	–	–
Shenzhen F.C.	10,364	2,423	10,071	13,000	6,400	13,460	12,439	10,277	–	–	–	–	–	–	–	16,279
Shijiazhuang Ever Bright	–	–	–	–	–	–	–	–	–	–	–	25,070	22,523	–	–	–
Sichuan Guancheng	5,545	5,477	–	–	–	–	–	–	–	–	–	–	–	–	–	–
Tianjin Tianhai	–	–	–	–	–	–	–	–	–	–	–	–	–	24,877	19,695	16,907
Tianjin Teda	13,182	16,462	18,071	15,429	14,007	14,554	14,757	18,242	14,175	16,577	17,190	19,661	21,740	14,531	18,487	19,038
Wuhan Guanggu	–	15,654	10,500	13,179	12,556	–	–	–	–	–	–	–	–	–	–	–
Wuhan Zall	–	–	–	–	–	–	–	–	–	14,403	–	–	–	–	–	20,484
Xiamen Lanshi	–	–	8,071	8,036	–	–	–	–	–	–	–	–	–	–	–	–
Yanbian Funde	–	–	–	–	–	–	–	–	–	–	–	–	19,304	18,058	–	–
Zhejiang	–	–	–	19,571	12,188	14,790	14,550	8,586	10,563	14,164	13,766	12,566	11,723	–	–	–
Zhejiang Yiteng	–	–	–	–	–	–	–	–	–	–	26,126	–	–	–	–	–
Whole season	10,838	10,284	10,611	15,112	13,444	16,059	14,581	17,651	18,740	18,571	18,986	22,193	24,159	23,766	24,107	23,464

=== Individual game highest attendance records ===
As of 05 September 2026

Rank	Home team	Score	Away team	Attendance	Stadium	Date
1	Jiangsu Sainty	1–1	Guangzhou Evergrande	65,769	Nanjing Olympic Sports Center Stadium	20 Oct 2012
2	Beijing Guoan	1–1	Shanghai Shenhua	64,118	Worker's Stadium	21 Mar 2026
3	Dalian Yingbo	1–1	Beijing Guoan	62,529	Dalian Suoyuwan Stadium	28 Aug 2026
4	Dalian Yingbo	2–1	Qingdao Hainiu	62,388	Dalian Suoyuwan Stadium	5 Sep 2026
5	Dalian Yingbo	1–4	Shanghai Shenhua	62,373	Dalian Suoyuwan Stadium	28 Jun 2026
6	Dalian Yingbo	2–0	Chengdu Rongcheng	62,356	Dalian Suoyuwan Stadium	23 May 2026
7	Dalian Yingbo	1–0	Chongqing Tonglianglong	62,339	Dalian Suoyuwan Stadium	1 May 2026
8	Dalian Yingbo	0–1	Shanghai Port	62,330	Dalian Suoyuwan Stadium	22 Nov 2025
9	Beijing Guoan	1–3	Shanghai Shenhua	62,291	Worker's Stadium	19 Jul 2025
10	Dalian Yingbo	1–0	Liaoning Tieren	62,075	Dalian Suoyuwan Stadium	8 Aug 2025

== Awards ==
The official Chinese Super league annual awards are given to clubs, players, managers and referees based on their performance during the season.

=== Trophy ===
The Fire-god trophy is the official trophy award to CSL champions. The trophy was created by the Sculpture Department of the Central Academy of Fine Arts and donated by the official partner of the Chinese Super League, Hengyuanxiang Group, in 2004. It consists of a pure gold trophy and a nephrite plinth base. The lower part of the trophy is the model of a Great Wall beacon tower; on the upper part, on top of the rising beacon, is a football wrapped by the earth, while the base has the engraved years and names of each Chinese Super League winner since 2004. The trophy weighs 5.548 kilograms (12.23 lb). The trophy and plinth are 52 cm (20 in) tall.

The trophy is not awarded to the winning club permanently. After the award ceremony they are awarded a replica, and they are allowed to retain the genuine trophy for one year.

=== Player of the Year ===
It is also named the "Most Valuable Player".

Year	Footballer	Club	Nationality
2004	Zhao Junzhe	Liaoning Zhongyu	China
2005	Branko Jelić	Beijing Guoan	Serbia
2006	Zheng Zhi	Shandong Luneng Taishan	China
2007	Du Zhenyu	Changchun Yatai	China
2008	Emil Martínez	Shanghai Shenhua	Honduras
2009	Samuel Caballero	Changchun Yatai	Honduras
2010	Duvier Riascos	Shanghai Shenhua	Colombia
2011	Muriqui	Guangzhou Evergrande	Brazil
2012	Cristian Dănălache	Jiangsu Sainty	Romania
2013	Darío Conca	Guangzhou Evergrande	Argentina
2014	Elkeson	Guangzhou Evergrande	Brazil
2015	Ricardo Goulart	Guangzhou Evergrande Taobao	Brazil
2016	Ricardo Goulart	Guangzhou Evergrande Taobao	Brazil
2017	Eran Zahavi	Guangzhou R&F	Israel
2018	Wu Lei	Shanghai SIPG	China
2019	Paulinho	Guangzhou Evergrande Taobao	Brazil
2020	Alex Texiera	Jiangsu FC	Brazil
2023	Wu Lei	Shanghai Port	China
2024	Wu Lei	Shanghai Port	China
2025	Valeri Qazaishvili	Shandong Taishan	Georgia

=== Golden Boot Award ===
This award is awarded to the top goalscorer of the league that year.

Year	Top scorer	Club	Goals
2004	(Ghana) Kwame Ayew	Inter Shanghai	17
2005	(Serbia) Branko Jelić	Beijing Guoan	21
2006	(China) Li Jinyu	Shandong Luneng Taishan	26
2007	(China) Li Jinyu	Shandong Luneng Taishan	15
2008	(Brazil) Éber Luís	Tianjin Teda	14
2009	(Argentina) Hernán Barcos (Honduras) Luis Ramírez	Shenzhen Asia Travel / Shanghai Shenhua; Guangzhou GPC	17
2010	(Colombia) Duvier Riascos	Shanghai Shenhua	20
2011	(Brazil) Muriqui	Guangzhou Evergrande	16
2012	(Romania) Cristian Dănălache	Jiangsu Sainty	23
2013	(Brazil) Elkeson	Guangzhou Evergrande	24
2014	(Brazil) Elkeson	Guangzhou Evergrande	28
2015	(Brazil) Aloísio	Shandong Luneng Taishan	22
2016	(Brazil) Ricardo Goulart	Guangzhou Evergrande Taobao	19
2017	(Israel) Eran Zahavi	Guangzhou R&F	27
2018	(China) Wu Lei	Shanghai SIPG	27
2019	(Israel) Eran Zahavi	Guangzhou R&F	29
2020	(Democratic Republic of the Congo) Cédric Bakambu	Beijing Guoan	14
2021	(Brazil) Júnior Negrão	Changchun Yatai	14
2022	(Brazil) Marcão	Wuhan Three Towns	27
2023	(Brazil) Leonardo	Changchun Yatai and Zhejiang	19
2024	(China) Wu Lei	Shanghai SIPG	34
2025	(Angola) Fábio Abreu	Beijing Guoan	28

There is also an award that is awarded to the top Chinese goalscorer of that season, which was first introduced in 2011.

Year	Top scorer	Club	Goals
2011	Yu Hanchao	Liaoning FC	12
2012	Wang Yongpo	Shandong Luneng Taishan	10
2013	Wu Lei	Shanghai East Asia	15
2014	Wu Lei	Shanghai East Asia	12
2015	Wu Lei	Shanghai SIPG	14
2016	Wu Lei	Shanghai SIPG	14
2017	Wu Lei	Shanghai SIPG	20
2018	Wu Lei	Shanghai SIPG	27
2019	Wei Shihao	Guangzhou Evergrande Taobao	11
2020	Wei Shihao	Guangzhou Evergrande Taobao	8
2021	Guo Tianyu	Shandong Taishan	10
2022	Zhang Yuning	Beijing Guoan	19
2023	Wu Lei	Shanghai Port	18

=== Manager of the Year ===
Year	Manager	Club	Standings	Nationality
2004	Zhu Guanghu	Shenzhen Jianlibao	Chinese Super League champions	China
2005	Vladimir Petrović	Dalian Shide	Chinese Super League champions; Chinese FA Cup winners	Serbia
2006	Ljubiša Tumbaković	Shandong Luneng Taishan	Chinese Super League champions; Chinese FA Cup winners	Serbia
2007	Gao Hongbo	Changchun Yatai	Chinese Super League champions	China
2008	Ljubiša Tumbaković	Shandong Luneng Taishan	Chinese Super League champions	Serbia
2009	Tang Yaodong	Henan Jianye	Chinese Super League third place	China
2010	Branko Ivanković	Shandong Luneng Taishan	Chinese Super League champions	Croatia
2011	Ma Lin	Liaoning Whowin	Chinese Super League third place	China
2012	Dragan Okuka	Jiangsu Sainty	Chinese Super League runners-up	Serbia
2013	Marcello Lippi	Guangzhou Evergrande	Chinese Super League champions; AFC Champions League winners	Italy
2014	Gregorio Manzano	Beijing Guoan	Chinese Super League runners-up	Spain
2015	Luiz Felipe Scolari	Guangzhou Evergrande Taobao	Chinese Super League champions; AFC Champions League winners	Brazil
2016	Luiz Felipe Scolari	Guangzhou Evergrande Taobao	Chinese Super League champions; Chinese FA Cup winners	Brazil
2017	Fabio Cannavaro	Tianjin Quanjian	Chinese Super League 3rd place	Italy
2018	Li Xiaopeng	Shandong Luneng Taishan	Chinese Super League 3rd place	China
2019	Li Xiaopeng	Shandong Luneng Taishan	Chinese Super League 3rd place	China
2023	Choi Kang-hee	Shandong Taishan	Chinese Super League 2nd place	South Korea

=== Youth Player of the Year ===
Year	Footballer	Club
2004	Chen Tao	Shenyang Ginde
2005	Hao Junmin	Tianjin Teda
2006	Wang Dalei	Shanghai Liancheng
2007	Hao Junmin	Tianjin Teda
2008	Huang Bowen	Beijing Guoan
2009	Deng Zhuoxiang	Jiangsu Sainty
2010	Zheng Zheng	Shandong Luneng Taishan
2011	Song Wenjie	Qingdao Jonoon
2012	Zhang Xizhe	Beijing Guoan
2013	Jin Jingdao	Shandong Luneng Taishan
2014	Liu Binbin	Shandong Luneng Taishan
2015	Vacancy	
2016	Li Xiaoming	Henan Jianye
2017	Hu Jinghang	Henan Jianye
2018	Huang Zichang	Jiangsu Suning
2019	Zhu Chenjie	Shanghai Greenland Shenhua
2023	Shahsat Hujahmat	Shenzhen
2024	Hu Hetao	Chengdu Rongcheng
2025	Wang Yudong	Zhejiang FC

There is also an award that is awarded to the U-23 player of the year, which was first introduced in 2017.

Year	Footballer	Club
2017	Huang Zhengyu	Guangzhou R&F

=== Goalkeeper of the Year ===
Year	Footballer	Club
2012	Deng Xiaofei	Jiangsu Sainty
2013	Zeng Cheng	Guangzhou Evergrande
2014	Wang Dalei	Shandong Luneng Taishan
2015	Zeng Cheng	Guangzhou Evergrande Taobao
2016	Zeng Cheng	Guangzhou Evergrande Taobao
2017	Yan Junling	Shanghai SIPG
2018	Yan Junling	Shanghai SIPG
2019	Yan Junling	Shanghai SIPG
2023	Wang Dalei	Shandong Taishan
2024	Wang Dalei	Shandong Taishan
2025	Liu Dianzuo	Chengdu Rongcheng

== Sponsors ==
=== Title sponsor ===
The current official title sponsor of the Chinese Super League is China Resources Beverage, since 2024.

Sponsorships
Season	Sponsor	Annual value	Official league name
2004	Siemens Mobile	€8 million	Siemens Mobile Chinese Super League
2005	No sponsor		Chinese Football Association Super League
2006	IPhox	€6 million	Iphox Chinese Super League
2007	Kingway Beer	¥36 million	Kingway Beer Chinese Super League
2008	Kingway Beer	¥38 million	Kingway Beer Chinese Super League
2009	Pirelli	€5 million	Pirelli Chinese Super League
2010	Pirelli	€5 million	Pirelli Chinese Super League
2011	Wanda Plaza	¥65 million	Wanda Plaza Chinese Super League
2012	Wanda Plaza	¥65 million	Wanda Plaza Chinese Super League
2013	Wanda Plaza	¥65 million	Wanda Plaza Chinese Super League
2014	Ping An Insurance	¥150 million	Ping An Chinese Super League
2015	Ping An Insurance	¥165 million	Ping An Chinese Super League
2016	Ping An Insurance	¥181.5 million	Ping An Chinese Super League
2017	Ping An Insurance	¥199.65 million	Ping An Chinese Super League
2018	Ping An Insurance	¥200 million	Ping An Chinese Super League
2019	Ping An Insurance		Ping An Chinese Super League
2020	Ping An Insurance		Ping An Chinese Super League
2021	Ping An Insurance		Ping An Chinese Super League
2022	Ping An Insurance		Ping An Chinese Super League
2023	Ping An Insurance		Ping An Chinese Super League
2024	China Resources Beverage		China Resources C'estbon Chinese Super League
2025	China Resources Beverage		China Resources Beverage Chinese Super League

=== Partners and suppliers ===
As well as sponsorship for the league itself, the Chinese Super League has a number of official partners and suppliers. The official equipment supplier for the league is Nike who have had the contract since the 2005 season. According to data published by Imedia Culture Communication Co., Ltd, the sponsor value from official partners and suppliers of Chinese Super League reaches 600 million Yuan in 2017 season.

The following table shows the partners and suppliers of the Chinese Super League. Bold denotes current sponsor.

Company	Duration
**Nike**	2020–2029
**Lenovo**	2025–
**Tsingtao**	2025–
**China Mobile (Migu)**	2024–
**China Resources Beverage**	2023–
**Chevron**	2023–
**Guoquan**	2023–
**EA Sports**	2018–
Mengniu Dairy	2020–2022
SAIC Motor	2018–2022
Fengkuang.cn	2017–2022
Tsingtao Laoshan Beer	2017–2022
Ganten	2017–2022
DHL	2014–2022
Tmall	2018–2020
Absen LED	2017–2020
Eastroc Super Drink	2018–2019
ImagineChina	2017–2019
TAG Heuer	2016–2019
Shell	2014–2019
JD.com	2010, 2013–2017
Red Bull	2015–2017
Ford	2014–2017
Yanghe	2017
Ledman Solar	2011–2016
Carlsberg	2013–2016
Samsung	2013–2014
Huiyuan Juice	2014
China Auto Rental	2013
SDLG	2011–2013
Harbin Beer	2011–2012
Shinery Motor	2009–2010
Frestech	2010
Canon	2004–2008
CP-Freda	2004–2006
Hengyuanxiang	2004–2006
Hyundai Motors	2004–2005

== Media coverage ==
=== China ===
The first broadcast rights holders of the rebranded Chinese Super League was the Shanghai Media Group (SMG). In September 2003, they signed a three-year contract for 2004, 2005 and 2006 seasons. The second SMG contract was signed in February 2007 for the five-year period from 2007 to 2011.

CCTV acquired the CSL television rights in 2012, and they held the rights until 2015 under annual contract. CSL was broadcast in CCTV's public cable TV channel CCTV5 and CCTV5+ but the satellite TV rights were sold to Cloud Media from 2014 to 2017.

Starting from the 2016 season, the Chinese Super League sold its television rights on a collective basis. However, it benefits CSL clubs almost equally according to CSL commercial contracts. The money is divided into three parts: 10% reserved for the Chinese football association and CSL company, which is paid out as facilities fees and management expenses, as to the remaining 90%, 81% of them is divided equally between the clubs; and 9% is awarded on a merit basis based on final league position.

The current media rights holder is the China Sports Media Co., Ltd. (CSM, simplified Chinese: 体奥动力, pinyin: tǐ ào dòng lì) CSM bought the rights for five seasons (2016–2020) for 8 billion yuan in October 2015. On January 24, 2018, The CSL and CSM reached an agreement to extend the original five-year contract to a 10-year one (2016–2025) and to raise the price to 11 billion yuan, about 1.73 billion dollars according to the exchange rate then prevailing.

=== Worldwide ===
Outside of China, currently IMG holds the global media rights to the Chinese Super League. The first contract was signed in 2016 for two seasons, and in 2018 IMG and CSM has sealed a three-year extension. The CSL is now broadcasting in 96 countries across the world.

Country/Region	Network
Australia	SBS
Austria^{DACH}	DAZN
Germany^{DACH}	DAZN
Italy	OneFootball
Switzerland^{DACH}	DAZN
Balkan countries: Bosnia and Herzegovina; Croatia; Montenegro; North Macedonia; Serbia; Slovenia	SportKlub
Brazil	ESPN
United States	ESPN
Latin America	ESPN
Canada	OneSoccer
Eurasia countries: Armenia; Azerbaijan; Belarus; Estonia; Kazakhstan; Kyrgyzstan; Latvia; Lithuania; Moldova; Tajikistan; Turkmenistan; Uzbekistan	Setanta Sports Eurasia
Georgia	Silknet
Hong Kong	TVB
India	FanCode
Israel	Sport 1
Macau	TDM
Philippines	Tap Sports
Poland	Polsat Sport
Portugal	Sport TV
Singapore	Singtel
Spain	GOL PLAY
Sub-Saharan Africa: Nigeria; South Africa; Kenya; Ghana	StarTimes
Turkey	S Sport

^DACH- other matches also available on Sportdigital

== Reserve league and Elite league ==
In early years the reserve league was open to all of the reserve teams from the Chinese Super League, China League One, and China League Two clubs. In 2011, the lower leagues started their own reserve league. The CSL reserve league strictly allows CSL clubs to compete, it is played at the next day of the regular league, also in home and away format, since 2018, the reserve league is held in the same venue of the regular league.

From 2014 to 2017, an elite league was held under the reserve league, restricted to players between 17 and 19 years old.

Season	Reserve Champions	Elite Champions
2004	Shanghai Shenhua	Not Held
2005	Not Held	Not Held
2006	Shandong Luneng Taishan	Not Held
2007	Tianjin Teda	Not Held
2008	Wuhan Guanggu	Not Held
2009	Not Held	Not Held
2010	Shandong Luneng Taishan	Not Held
2011	Shandong Luneng Taishan	Not Held
2012	Shandong Luneng Taishan	Not Held
2013	Shandong Luneng Taishan	Not Held
2014	Shandong Luneng Taishan	Shanghai Shenhua
2015	Shandong Luneng Taishan	Hangzhou Greentown
2016	Shanghai SIPG	Jiangsu Suning
2017	Shandong Luneng Taishan	Guangzhou Evergrande Taobao
2018	Jiangsu Suning	Not Held
2019	Shandong Luneng Taishan	Not Held
2020	Not Held	Not Held

== Youth development and Youth Super League ==
Since the inception of the CSL, the CFA has required all of its clubs to operate youth development, yet it was not a strict criteria until 2018. In the CSL club criteria created in 2017, clubs who could not meet the youth development programme criteria will be relegated to lower leagues.

According to the CSL club criteria, the youth teams of CSL clubs must have their own training center, coaching staff, and medical group, and a minimum of 15% of club budgets must be invested into youth programmes. CSL clubs are required to have 5 youth level teams at ages U19, U17, U15, U14 and U13. Clubs must have youth academies and introduce grassroots football plans to cooperate with local football associations, school and social corporations.

In 2017 the Youth League system was officially rebranded as Youth Super League. YSL is open to all the youth teams of all professional clubs, selected football academies and local FA training teams in China. Since 2018 the U19 Youth Super league is played with two groups of 18, a total of 36 clubs. Clubs plays home and away season with promotion and relegation introduced. The U17 and U15 Youth Super Leagues play in six regional leagues with 76 and 77 teams respectively. The U14 and U13 Youth Super leagues play in five regional leagues with 40 and 45 teams respectively.

Besides the Youth Super League, there are also other tournaments for youth teams across China, including Youth Championship plays in pre-season, Youth FA cup runs during the Youth Super League fixture, and Youth Champions Cup plays in off-season.

Season	U-19/19A Champions	U-19B Champions	U-19C Champions	U-18 Champions	U-17 Champions	U-16 Champions	U-15 Champions	U-14 Champions	U-13 Champions
2004	Shanghai Shenhua	Not held	Not held	Not held	Shandong Luneng Taishan	Not held	Shandong Luneng Taishan	Not held	Not held
2005	Shandong Luneng Taishan	Not held	Not held	Not held	Shandong Luneng Taishan	Not held	Shandong Luneng Taishan	Not held	Not held
2006	Beijing Guoan	Not held	Not held	Not held	Shandong Luneng Taishan	Not held	Shandong Luneng Taishan	Not held	Not held
2007	Chongqing Lifan	Not held	Not held	Not held	Shandong Luneng Taishan	Not held	Shandong Luneng Taishan	Not held	Not held
2008	Beijing Guoan	Not held	Not held	Not held	Changchun Yatai	Not held	Shandong Luneng Taishan	Not held	Not held
2009	Shandong Luneng Taishan	Not held	Not held	Not held	Changchun Yatai	Not held	Wuhan FA	Not held	Not held
2010	Not held	Not held	Not held	Not held	Shandong Luneng Taishan	Not held	Shanghai Luckystar	Not held	Not held
2011	Beijing Guoan	Not held	Not held	Not held	Shanghai FA	Not held	Hubei FA	Not held	Shanghai Genbao
2012	Jiangsu FA	Not held	Not held	Not held	Liaoning FA	Not held	Guangzhou FA	Not held	Shanghai Genbao
2013	Henan Jianye	Not held	Not held	Not held	Jiangsu FA	Not held	Shandong Luneng Taishan	Not held	Not held
2014	Shanghai Shenhua	Not held	Not held	Not held	Guangzhou R&F	Not held	Henan Jianye	Shanghai Genbao	Not held
2015	Not held	Not held	Not held	Guangdong FA	Not held	Jiangsu FA	Shandong Luneng Taishan	Not held	Shandong Luneng Taishan
2016	Shaanxi FA	Not held	Not held	Not held	Jiangsu FA	Not held	Shandong Luneng Taishan	Shandong Luneng Taishan	Guangzhou Evergrande Taobao
2017	Not held	Not held	Not held	Shandong Luneng Taishan	Not held	Shandong Luneng Taishan	Shandong Luneng Taishan	Changchun Yatai	Shandong Luneng Taishan
2018	Shanghai SIPG	Evergrande Football School	Not held	Not held	Shanghai Greenland Shenhua	Not held	Hubei FA	Shandong Luneng Taishan	Guangzhou Evergrande Taobao
2019	Guangzhou Evergrande Taobao	Shanghai Greenland Shenhua	Fujian FA	Not held	Shandong Luneng Taishan	Not held	Shandong FA	Shandong FA	Shandong FA
2020	Not held	Not held	Not held	Not held	Not held	Not held	Not held	Not held	Not held

== See also ==
- Football in China
- Chinese Football Association
- Chinese football champions
- Chinese football records
- Chinese FA Cup
- Chinese FA Super Cup
- Chinese Jia-A League
- China League One
- China League Two
- Chinese Champions League
- List of Chinese Super League referees
