= SBS Contents Hub =

Subsidiary of Seoul Broadcasting System (SBS)

SBS Contents Hub Co., Ltd
- Type: Public
- Traded as: KRX: 046140
- Industry: Movie, Music, and Publisher
- Founded: August 21, 1999
- Defunct: April 2024
- Fate: Merged into Studio S
- Headquarters: Seoul, South Korea
- Revenue: ▲6.1 trillion Korean Won (2012)
- Owner: SBS Media Holdings (64%)
- Number of employees: 106
- Parent: SBS Media Holdings
- Website: www.sbscontentshub.co.kr

SBS Contents Hub (former SBSi) is the digital window of SBS Media Group. Its headquarters are located in Seoul, South Korea. SBSi is also affiliated with SIREN Entertainment. The current CEO of SBS Contents Hub is Lee, Nam-Ki.

In April 2024, it was merged into Studio S.

== History ==
The company was established on August 21, 1999 as SBS Internet, renamed SBSi in 2000, and renamed SBS Contents Hub in 2009.

In 2017, SBS Contents Hub spun off its web agency division as SBS I&M (SBS Internet & Media). The spun-off entity was renamed SBSi in 2022, reviving this company's former name, and relocated its headquarters to the SBS Broadcasting Center in Mok-dong, Seoul. In 2024, that company merged with SBS Digital News Lab and established a news service division, and operates as the digital platform and new media subsidiary of SBS Media Group.

== Productions ==
=== Games ===
- "WonderKing Online"

== See also ==
- NDOORS Corporation
- WonderKing Online
- Studio S
