= Qingdao derby =

Football rivalries in Qingdao, China

The Qingdao derby (Chinese: 青岛德比; pinyin: Qīngdǎo Débǐ) is a name given to a football derby contested by any two teams in the city of Qingdao, China. The term specifically refers to individual matches between the teams, but can also be used to describe the general rivalry between the different clubs.

== Clubs ==
As of 2027 season, there are three clubs in the Chinese Super League, China League One and China League Two that play in Qingdao:

- Qingdao West Coast F.C. (Super League)
- Qingdao Hainiu F.C. (League One)
- Qingdao Red Lions F.C. (League Two)

Former clubs in the highest league include Qingdao F.C. (CSL 2020–2021). Qingdao Hailifeng F.C. were formerly in the second-tier league.

== Competitive match results in the first two highest leagues ==
Date	Competition	Stadium	Home team	Result	Away team	Home scorer	Away scorer	Reference
2014.5.10	China League One	Conson Stadium	Qingdao F.C.	0–0	Qingdao Hainiu F.C.			
2014.9.20	China League One	Qingdao Tiantai Stadium	Qingdao Hainiu F.C.	1–0	Qingdao F.C.	Wang Wei		
2015.3.22	China League One	Conson Stadium	Qingdao F.C.	0–2	Qingdao Hainiu F.C.		Wang Jun，Reis	
2015.7.12	China League One	Qingdao Tiantai Stadium	Qingdao Hainiu F.C.	1–0	Qingdao F.C.	Quan Lei		
2016.5.28	China League One	Conson Stadium	Qingdao F.C.	3–2	Qingdao Hainiu F.C.	Wan Houliang，Yuri (footballer, born 1982)，Martí Crespí	Wang Jianwen^{2}	
2016.9.11	China League One	Qingdao Tiantai Stadium	Qingdao Hainiu F.C.	0–1	Qingdao F.C.		Zhang Jiaqi (footballer)	
2022.11.1	China League One	Tangshan Nanhu City Football Training Base Field No.1	Qingdao West Coast F.C.	1–5	Qingdao Hainiu F.C.			
2022.11.24	China League One	Tangshan Nanhu City Football Training Base Field No.3	Qingdao Hainiu F.C.	1–1	Qingdao West Coast F.C.			
2024.3.30	Chinese Super League	Qingdao West Coast University City Sports Center	Qingdao West Coast F.C.	1–0	Qingdao Hainiu F.C.			
2024.7.7	Chinese Super League	Qingdao Youth Football Stadium	Qingdao Hainiu F.C.	3–1	Qingdao West Coast F.C.			
2025.2.23	Chinese Super League	Qingdao Youth Football Stadium	Qingdao Hainiu F.C.	2–2	Qingdao West Coast F.C.			
2025.6.29	Chinese Super League	Qingdao West Coast University City Sports Center	Qingdao West Coast F.C.	1–0	Qingdao Hainiu F.C.			
2026.4.17	Chinese Super League	Qingdao Youth Football Stadium	Qingdao Hainiu F.C.	0–0	Qingdao West Coast F.C.			
2026.8.2	Chinese Super League	Qingdao West Coast University City Sports Center	Qingdao West Coast F.C.	2–0	Qingdao Hainiu F.C.			
