= WKO =

WKO may refer to

- Austrian Federal Economic Chamber, an Austrian business community
- WonderKing Online, an online role playing game
- Württemberg Chamber Orchestra Heilbronn (Württembergisches Kammerorchester Heilbronn), a German orchestra
