= NDOORS Corporation =

Korean gaming corporation

- Type: Digital
- Industry: Game developer and Publisher
- Founded: 1999
- Headquarters: Seoul, South Korea
- Parent: Nexon
- Website: http://www.ndoors.com

NDOORS Corporation is a Korean gaming corporation and developer of online games and MMORPGs and is a subsidiary of one of the world's largest online gaming companies, Nexon. Its headquarters are located in Seoul, South Korea. NDOORS Corporation first started out as "Intizen co., Ltd" in September 1999, but later changed their name in October 2004 to "Ndoors Corporation." On January 18, 2006, NDOORS Corporation took over Koong Entertainment which meant that NDOORS not only would be able to create PC Games, but PSP2 and PSP console games as well. The current CEO of NDOORS Corporation is Cho, SeongWon. The NDOORS logo can be simplified as "Distinction, Sympathy, and Expansion."

In 2017, NDOORS was merged into Nexon Red.

== History ==
NDOORS Corp. published their first title, GoonZu Online, in January 2004. This would become their first successful game and would lead to many awards. Thanks to GoonZu Online's success Walden International funded $4 Million to NDOORS Corporation and Kee Lock CHUA, Managing Director of Walden International, would join NDOORS' board as director. This would become a major part in NDOORS globalization drive. Recently, their title, "Atlantica Online," has been awarded First Prize at the 2008 Korea Game Award.

=== Partnership with NEXON Corporation ===
On October 13, 2006, Nexon CEO, Kim, Jung Joo, announced that they, NEXON Corporation, have signed a contract with NDOORS Corporation on October 12. Later that year, on November 9, NEXON Corporation, under the NEXON Korea division, at GSTAR 2006 released a gameplay video of "KoongPa" developed by NDOORS Corporation.

=== Nexon's acquisition ===
On May 4, 2010, Nexon Corporation announced that they had acquired NDOORS.

== Divisions ==
=== NDOORS Global ===
NDOORS Global Logo

Also known as NDOORS Interactive, this branch is located in USA, North America. NDOORS Interactive contained three games, "Atlantica Online," "WonderKing Online," and Luminary: Rise of the GoonZu." WonderKing Online was unique to NDOORS Global, but now has been licensed to Ignited Games. Whereas Atlantica (also known as Atlantica Online) and Luminary (also known as GoonZu Online and Luminary: Rise of the Goonzu) are located in other divisions as well.

=== NDOORS Japan ===
NDOORS Japan Logo

Also known as NDOORS Entertainment, this branch is located in Japan. NDOORS Entertainment contains four games, "GoonZu Online," "Atlantica Online," "Corum Online," and "Liens Online." Liens Online is unique to the NDOORS Japan division. See NDOORS Japan (Locations) for more information.

== Locations ==
=== China ===
Begun in April 2008, NDOORS Corporation licensed Atlantica Online to The9. Open Beta Testing for "GoonZu Online" (Chinese: HwanReo Goonzu) began in China, HwanReo Entertainment is the company that runs the Chinese version of GoonZu Online.

=== Europe ===
Currently Aeria Games (of Germany) has been licensed "GoonZu Online." This version of "GoonZu Online" has already been aired but Aeria Games decided to not continue the service and the server merged with the North American one. Since 2009 Ndoors is operating from Germany for Europe. They started 2009 in Germany with Atlantica Online, French service for Atlantica Online started 2010.

=== Japan ===
Begun on August 10 of 2005, NDOORS Corporation licensed "GoonZu Online" to GameSpot. GoonZu Online would not go commercial in Japan until August 2006. See NDOORS Japan (Divisions) for more information.

=== Korea ===
The Korean NDOORS division was the forerunner of NDOORS Corporation.

=== Taiwan ===
Begun in September 2007, NDOORS Corporation licensed "GoonZu Online" (Chinese: 君主Online) to MacroWell Technology Co.Ltd.

=== United States ===
Begun in October 2007, NDOORS Corporation licensed "GoonZu Online" to NHN USA.

=== Vietnam ===
Begun in February 2009, NDOORS Corporation licensed "Atlantica Online" to VTC Intercom. "Atlantica Online" is currently the only game from the NDOORS Vietnam division.

=== South America ===
Beginning October 2010, NDOORS Corporation licensed Atlantica Online to Ignited Games for the complete South American market. Commercial launch for "Atlantica Online Espanol" began on November 10, 2011, with the "Atlantica Online Brazil" commercial launch in June, 2011. Atlantica Online is currently Ignited Games' flagship title for the South American market.

== Affiliates ==
=== Partners ===
There are thirteen partners

1. "Aeria Games"
2. "AsiaSoft"
3. "GALA Net"
4. "Gamania"
5. "CJ Corporation"
6. "Ignited Games"
7. "MacroWell"
8. "Nexon Corporation"
9. "NHN Corporation"
10. "SBSi"
11. "The9"
12. "VTC Intercom"
13. "Kreon Ltd."

=== Games ===
- "Atlantica Online"
- "Corum Online"
- "KoongPa"
- "Liens Online"
- "Time N Tales"

==== Luminary ====
Global Luminary series:

- "Luminary: Rise of the Goonzu"
- "GoonZu Online"
- "GoonZu Special"

== See also ==
- Aeria Games
- AsiaSoft
- Atlantica Online
- CJ Corporation
- Gamania
- Ignited Games
- Nexon Corporation
- NHN Corporation
- SBSi
- The9
