= Zhu Jun (businessman) =

Chinese businessman

- Born: 7 October 1966 (age 60); Shanghai, China
- Occupations: founder of The9, Ltd. former chairman of Shanghai Shenhua
Association football career
- Height: 1.80 m (5 ft 11 in)
- Position: Midfielder
Team information
- Current team: Shanghai Second
- Number: 16
Senior career*
Years	Team	Apps	(Gls)
2023–2025	Shanghai Second		
2026–	Sham Shui Po		
- * Club domestic league appearances and goals

Jun Zhu (Chinese: 朱骏; born 7 October 1966) is a Chinese-born Singaporean industrialist and businessman and the Chairman of Nasdaq listed company the Nine City (NASDAQ: NCTY). He is also known for his chairmanship of Shanghai Shenhua football club.

== Early life ==
Zhu was born in Shanghai and attended Shanghai Jiaotong University. He dropped out of the university after two years. He moved to the United States in 1993.

== The9 ==
In 1999, Zhu founded online gaming company The9 Ltd, which was successful and listed on the NASDAQ exchange in 2004. The company is the source of his wealth.

== Shanghai Zobon ==
He purchased Shanghai Zobon football club from businessman Wei Ping in 2005. On 21 December 2005, most players on the team went to the headquarters of Zhu Jun's company to request the wages he failed to pay.

== Shanghai Shenhua ==
Zhu purchased a controlling 28.5% stake in Chinese Super League football club Shanghai Shenhua in 2007. Five state-owned enterprises hold the remainder but reportedly agreed to up Zhu's stake to 70% after two years if he invested US$23.6 million.

As chairman, Zhu Jun is known for his bizarre management style at the club, including interfering with the team management and a lack of respect for his employees. In August 2007, he even forced the manager to name him in the squad of Shanghai Shenhua for a game against the English club Liverpool F.C.

In the 2011 season, with cash apparently running short, Zhu Jun decided to sell most players in the squad including the top goal scorer Duvier Riascos, Du Wei and Gao Lin, causing the team to free-fall in the league. On 17 August 2011, angry fans in the stands of Hongkou Stadium demanded that Zhu Jun leave the club. Shortly afterwards, the club reacted by declaring that the club considered moving the team out of Shanghai, which further infuriated supporters.

In April 2012 he sacked all the coaches assisting manager Jean Tigana just after five matches in the league, aiming to force Jean Tigana to resign. It has been suggested that this is part of a strategy to sign big-name players and managers, promising wages that were beyond his financial capability. In doing so he managed to attract attention, which helped to promote his own business. Subsequently, he found excuses to fire them and tried to avoid the payment of wages. He paid a few local media to provide supportive comment.

In 2012, the club signed former Chelsea players Nicolas Anelka and Didier Drogba. At the end of season both stars left because of the delay of payment of the wage.

In April 2013, Zhu again delayed the payment of the wages of players causing three South American players including Giovanni Moreno, Rolando Schiavi and Patricio Toranzo to strike. Three players decline to play a home league game against Liaoning Hongyun. Eventually in July 2013, manager Sergio Batista resigned because he had not received his wage for four months.

== See also ==
- The9 Ltd.
