= Atlantica Online =

2008 video game

- Developer(s): NDOORS Corporation
- Publisher(s): Valofe Other publishers: ^{NA} Valofe; ^{JP} Nexon Co., Ltd.; ^{TW} Gamania; ^{VN} VTC Games; ^{CN} The9 Limited; ^{TH} AsiaSoft; ^{EU} Valofe; ^{RU} Innova Co. S.à rl; ^{ID} Lyto; ^{BR} Ignited Games Inc
- Director(s): Taegon Kim
- Producer(s): Taegon Kim
- Designer(s): Hyukmin Kweon; Taeckeun Lee; Eunyoung Park; Junghun Lee
- Programmer(s): Soonki Kwon; Junmo Ku
- Artist(s): Jongphil Jung; Dongwhan Kim; Sunghoon Jung
- Writer(s): Jikeun Ryu
- Composer(s): Minho Jang
- Engine: Gamebryo
- Platform(s): Microsoft Windows
- Release: KR January 2008; NA October 30, 2008; JP November 25, 2008; TW April 23, 2009; VN June 2009; CN June 3, 2009; TH September 9, 2009; DE November 20, 2009; FR May 6, 2010; RU June 15, 2010; ID June 21, 2010; ESP November 23, 2010; BR June 1, 2011; UK April 9, 2014
- Genre(s): MMORPG, tactical RPG
- Mode(s): Multiplayer

Atlantica Online is a free-to-play (F2P) 3D tactical massively multiplayer online role-playing game (MMORPG) developed by NDOORS Corporation. The game is currently published by Valofe. The game's primary setting is a fantasy-themed alternate history Earth composed of a diverse blend of historical, cultural, allegorical, and mythological elements. The game world is primarily modeled after real-world geography with accessible locations on six of the seven continents as well as the mythical floating continent of Atlantis from which the game's name is derived.

== Gameplay ==
A player and his mercenaries accompanied by two groups of mobs attacking an enemy mob group.

Atlantica Online is a turn-based tactical MMORPG in which the player primarily assumes the role of a descendant of the Atlantean people. The primary goal of the game is to search for your ancestral home to save the world from the effects of Oriharukon, a substance created by the ancient Atlanteans. The player's journey spans the globe and transcends time in search of clues that will lead to the lost civilization. The player battles men, monsters, and machines that have been corrupted by the Oriharukon's Influence.

The game design puts a strong emphasis on membership in guilds, which are permitted to own and customize towns like a business, profiting from the transactions that take place within their town. Up to ten guilds can unite under a single banner to form a Nation and go to war with other nations. Guilds and nations offer a variety of benefits to their members including passive boosts, guild-oriented dungeons, and 'Guild Crafting' where every member of a guild works together to complete a single craft. Players can also own their own houses.

In addition to the main quest line, the game features a variety of supplementary side quests rich with history and lore, a complex skill system, an in-depth crafting system, and a player housing system. As players journey through the world of Atlantica Online, their characters and mercenaries grow and develop, gaining access to new, more powerful skills and equipment along the way. As the level cap has advanced, the developers have implemented a set of milestones in the leveling structure with associated level-specific quest lines that enable players access to powerful class-specific skills known as "talents" upon completion. Players can recruit up to eight mercenaries to join them in their travels, and each can increase in experience level. There are relatively few equipment options available to players apart from a few class-specific armor sets and limited-time 'legendary items'. Players can combine armor effects through an "enchantment" process.

The game's battle system is turn-based. When a player character and an enemy character come into contact with each other on the game map, both parties are transported into an instance where the battle takes place. During battle other players' groups and other monster groups may join in to a maximum of three groups on each side. In battle, the characters of each party are positioned on a 3x3 grid. Using attacks and abilities, the goal is to beat the opponent. The rewards include experience points and loot like the game's virtual currency, various materials, pieces of equipment etc. Player versus player combat operates through this system. There are two leagues players can join, as well as daily, weekly, and monthly fights and championships.

The Tactical battle system (TBS) is a separate, additional combat system that differs in many respects from the original system. Players and their adversaries are placed in a landscape where moving around characters freely is possible. New decision impacts like the possibility to take cover, different height levels and the movement speed of specific characters are added while certain mechanics of the original combat system are removed. Players complete story-based and objective-driven missions in the tactical battle system.

A dungeon in Atlantica Online is an instance region that can be opened with a special key and allows up to three players to clean the dungeon of enemies for a final reward in addition to the normal loot. Raid dungeons were added in 2012.

=== Setting ===
The world of Atlantica Online features real world locations mixed with mythological and fantasy elements. Countries like Germany and China are represented, with cities like Munich, Moscow, and Sapporo as visitable hubs that offer services like banks, hospitals, the marketplace where players can trade goods with each other and other facilities. Though the locations on the map feature climates similar to their real world counterparts, the architecture is often a generic recreation of well known structure types, such as the cities in Eastern Europe and Japan.

The locations are based on real world locations, but are often geographically out of place and altered for effect. Most of the civilizations represented are anachronistic: Rome is set in the Holy Roman Empire, while Great Britain is independent, the Ottoman Empire reigns in Turkey, Southeast Asia resembles ancient Indian kingdoms before Western colonization and Islamic influence, and North America is caught up in the Industrial Revolution.

== Development ==
The North American English version, available worldwide, was first distributed by the USA subsidiary company NDOORS Interactive, Inc. A closed beta version was made available to FilePlanet subscribers in July 2008. The first phase of the open beta ended on July 28; the start of the second phase began on August 7. Atlantica Online ended its beta period and began its official run on October 30. NDOORS also launched Atlantica Online Germany, for European players, on October 21. The closed Beta started on September 1 and ended after a month. The Chinese company The9 obtained exclusive rights for distributing and operating Atlantica Online in China. Russian localized version open beta test started on May 12, 2010, supported by Innova Systems company.

Atlantica's publisher and developer, Valofe, regularly releases new content updates. Non-Korean servers generally receive the updates after the Korean servers. Updates include, for instance, new dungeons, quests, NPCs, skills, mercenaries, outfits, equipment, mounts, and community features. Updates also balance the game's elements. Implemented in August 2010, the Troy Story Arc is a series of 'missions' following the format of the Tactical Battle System (TBS) that was introduced in the same patch. In each mission one or more players take part in a fantasy version of the Trojan War. The rewards include generous amounts of experience points and valuable chests containing loot. In April 2013, the first part of the major content update 'Rise of Atlantis' was released, followed by the second part in May and the third in June. A new area, the Mythical region of Atlantis, was added, which is divided by two, West and Eastern Atlantis. This update was the most extensive to that date, introducing a new continent to explore (mythical Atlantis), new mercenary classes, new equipment, content and several changes to other features of the game. Implemented in April 2014, the Mayan Hero Arc is the start of the new "Heroes" class line following the format of the Tactical Battle System (TBS) that was introduced previously in some raids and other more classic Content. In each mission one or more players take part in a fantasy version of the ancient mythology. The rewards can be rewarding if the highest level of content is done. Other features to the game, such as Whip using Mercenary's and a Corps Feature were added to the Korean servers during 2014 and 2015.

In December 2008, the North American continent was added, which features New York City as a new explorable city and the United States and Mexico as explorable countries. These contain a few dungeons, but greatly expand the map in Atlantica. Developers have also mentioned the possibility of adding the continents of the Southern Hemisphere, excluding Antarctica.

== Reception ==
Reception

Review scores
Publication	Score
GameSpot	8.6/10
Giant Bomb	4/5
IGN	8.5/10

Awards
Publication	Award
Ten Ton Hammer	Best Free To Play Game of 2008
2008 Korea Game Awards	Best Game
GameOgre's 2008 Online Game Awards	Most Innovative Online Game
OnRPG Member's Choice Awards 2008	Top Free MMO of 2008 Best Innovation in an MMO of 2008 Best Gameplay in an MMO of 2008
ChinaJoy 2008 Golden Plume Awards	Best Foreign Online Game

Reception of Atlantica Online has been largely positive. The game received a number of awards upon release in 2008. Atlantica Online was selected as an official game for the Korean Game and Game World Championship (GNGWC) in 2008 and 2009 and won the prestigious Golden Plume Award for Best Foreign Online Game at the 2008 China Digital Entertainment Expo and Conference (ChinaJoy).

The game is acclaimed for its innovative turn-based battle system and its integration with community features. Danny Gourley of Ten Ton Hammer praised its gameplay, stating that "it requires gamers to think a little instead of just mashing buttons".
