= List of Chinese Super League referees =

This list is about current match officials in Chinese Super League, include only referees.

== Match officials ==
As of December 2024.

=== Referees ===
Referee	FIFA listed	AFC/UEFA elite	Birthyear	Association	CSL debut	Occupations
(China) Ma Ning	✓	✓	1979	Jiangsu	2010	Professional referee, Chinese Football Association
(China) Fu Ming	✓	✓	1983	Beijing	2010	Professional referee, Chinese Football Association
(China) Zhang Lei	✓	✓	1982	Dalian	2009	Professional referee, Chinese Football Association
(China) Shen Yinhao	✓	✓	1986	Shanghai	2016	Lecturer, Tongji University International College of Football
(China) Gu Chunhan			1982	Wuhan	2016	
(China) Wang Jing			1983	Guizhou	2016	Deputy director, Guizhou Football Management Center Department of Competition
(China) Li Haixin			1983	Guangdong	2016	Lecturer, Guangzhou Sport University College of Football
(China) Ai Kun			1983	BSU	2010	Teacher, Beijing Sport University China Football College
(China) Guan Xing			1981	Beijing	2015	Deputy General Manager, Beijing CUPES Sports & Culture Center
(China) Wang Di	✓		1981	Shanghai	2010	Executive secretary, Shanghai Football Association Referee Committee
(China) Jin Jingyuan			1989	Chongqing	2017	Assistant, Chongqing University of Arts and Sciences Physical Education School
(China) Tang Shunqi			1988	Chengdu	2020	
(China) Niu Minghui			1985	Beijing	2021	
(China) Huang Yi			1986	Jiangsu	2020	
(China) Kou Jianxun			1978	Dalian	2022	
(China) Yu Bo			1979	Liaoning	2021	Lecturer, Shenyang Sport University Sports Coaching School
(China) Liang Caiwei			1979	Shenzhen	2020	Teacher, Shenzhen Futian Foreign Languages High School
(China) Liu Wei			1980	Shenyang	2020	
(China) Zhen Wei			1985	Tianjin	2021	
(China) Memetjan Ahmet			1989	Xinjiang	2021	
(China) Xing Qi			1980	Zhejiang	2020	Assistant professor, Zhejiang Shuren University School of Basic Education
(China) Jia Zhiliang					2021	
(China) Du Jianxin	✓	✓			2021	
(China) Dai Yige					2021	
(China) Liu Zhao					2021	
(China) He Kai					2021	
(China) Gao Peng					2022	
(China) Wang Wei					2022	
(China) Wan Tao					2022	
(China) Sun Shengyu					2022	
(China) Xu Qiangqiang					2022	
(China) Gan Shuran			1989		2023	
(China) Chen Jindong					2024	
(China) Cui Yong					2024	
(China) He Xin					2024	
(China) Liang Songshang					2024	
(China) Ma Yunkun					2024	
(China) Meng Xiangkun					2024	
(China) Mu Yuchen					2024	
(China) Ren Tong					2024	
(China) Shan Dan'ao					2024	
(China) Su Zihao					2024	
(China) Sun Lei					2024	
(China) Zhang Chao					2024	
(China) Zhang Yangfan					2024	
(China) Zhu Wenbin					2024	
