= Chinese Professional Football League =

Chinese Professional Football League 中国足球职业联赛联合会
- Founded: 23 January 2025; 15 months ago
- Country: China
- Confederation: AFC
- Divisions: Chinese Super League; China League One; China League Two
- Number of clubs: 52
- Level on pyramid: 1–3
- Relegation to: Chinese Champions League
- Domestic cup: Chinese FA Cup
- Current champions: Shanghai Port (2025)
- Website: cfl-china.cn

Chinese Professional Football League
- Simplified Chinese: 中国足球职业联赛联合会
- Traditional Chinese: 中國足球職業聯賽聯合會
Transcriptions
Standard Mandarin
- Hanyu Pinyin: Zhōngguó Zúqiú Zhíyè Liánsài Liánhéhuì

CFL
- Simplified Chinese: 中足联
- Traditional Chinese: 中足聯
Transcriptions
Standard Mandarin
- Hanyu Pinyin: Zhōngzúlián

The Chinese Professional Football League (Note: 中国足球职业联赛联合会 literally means "Chinese Professional Football League Union" instead of "Chinese Professional Football League". In fact, "Chinese Professional Football League" is the translation of 中国足球职业联盟 (or 中国职业足球联盟), the name proposed during the organization's preparation phase.) (Chinese: 中国足球职业联赛联合会; pinyin: Zhōngguó Zúqiú Zhíyè Liánsài Liánhéhuì), abbreviated as CFL (Chinese: 中足联; pinyin: Zhōngzúlián), is an independent federation aimed at operating all levels of China's professional football leagues, overseeing the Chinese Super League (CSL), China League One, and China League Two. Established in 2025, it replaced the Chinese Football Association (CFA)'s direct management of leagues to improve governance and financial sustainability.

The CFL was created under China's 2015 football reform plan to decentralize league operations. It manages commercial rights, scheduling, and promotion/relegation, while the CFA retains regulatory powers. The league aims to curb corruption and overspending.

== History ==
2015: The State Council's "Football Reform Plan" proposes separating league management from the CFA.

2022–2024: Anti-corruption crackdown arrests 13 CFA officials, including former chairman Chen Xuyuan.

2025: CFL officially launches with 56 clubs across three tiers. The inaugural council includes representatives from clubs, media, and legal experts.

== League structure ==
The CFL operates three tiers:

1. Chinese Super League (16 teams)

2. China League One (16 teams)

3. China League Two (24 teams): Includes reserve squads (e.g., Shandong Taishan B) and promoted Chinese Champions League teams.
