= Dalian derby =

Football rivalries in Dalian, China

The Dalian derby (Chinese: 大连德比; pinyin: Dàlián Débǐ) is a name given to a football derby contested by any two teams in the city of Dalian, China. The term specifically refers to individual matches between the teams, but can also be used to describe the general rivalry between the different clubs. Dalian Shide against Dalian Aerbin are ranked as the most ferocious Dalian Derbies.

== Clubs ==
As of 2027 season, there are four clubs in the Chinese Super League, China League One and China League Two that play in Dalian:

- Dalian Young Boy F.C. (Super League)
- Dalian K'un City F.C. (League One)
- Dalian Kewei F.C. (League One)
- Dalian Young Boy B (League Two)

Dalian Shide F.C., established in 1983, was a former professional football club based in Dalian with the longest history in the city, other former football clubs based in Dalian in the highest league include Dalian Professional F.C. (CSL 2012–2014, 2018–2023). Dalian Yiteng F.C.(Jia-B 1995), Dalian Shunfa F.C.(Jia-B 1996), Liaoning F.C.(Jia-B 1998), Dalian Sidelong F.C.(Jia-B 2002), Dalian Changbo F.C.(China League One 2004−2005), Dalian Transcendence F.C. (China League One 2016−2018) were formerly in the second-tier league.

== Shide-Aerbin Derbies ==
#	Date	Competition	Home team	Result	Away team	Location	Attendance
1	2012.3.18	2012 Chinese Super League	Dalian Aerbin	3−3	Dalian Shide	Jinzhou Stadium	25,791
2	2012.7.14	2012 Chinese Super League	Dalian Shide	3−2	Dalian Aerbin	Jinzhou Stadium	28,921

Statistics as of 14 July 2012.

== Yifang-Transcendence Derbies ==
#	Date	Competition	Home team	Result	Away team	Location	Attendance
1	2016.4.10	2016 China League One	Dalian Transcendence	0−2	Dalian Yifang	Jinzhou Stadium	17,721
2	2016.7.23	2016 China League One	Dalian Yifang	1−2	Dalian Transcendence	Dalian Sports Center Stadium	20,392
3	2017.6.10	2017 China League One	Dalian Transcendence	2−4	Dalian Yifang	Jinzhou Stadium	15,772
4	2017.10.15	2017 China League One	Dalian Yifang	2−1	Dalian Transcendence	Dalian Sports Center Stadium	24,981

Statistics as of 15 October 2017.
