= 2018 Chinese U-19 Super League =

Chinese U-19 Super League
- Season: 2018

The 2018 Chinese U-19 Super League (Chinese: 2018全国青少年男子足球超级联赛(U19)) is the 1st season since the establishment of the Chinese Youth Super League in 2017. It replaces the Elite U-19 League.

== Division A ==
=== League table ===
Pos	Team	Pld	W	D	L	GF	GA	GD	Pts	Qualification or relegation
1	Shanghai SIPG U-19	10	7	2	1	24	9	+15	23	Champion
2	Xinjiang Tianshan Leopard U-19	10	7	1	2	20	9	+11	22	
3	Hebei China Fortune U-19	10	7	1	2	16	6	+10	22	
4	Jiangsu Suning U-19	10	6	2	2	29	10	+19	20	
5	Dalian Yifang U-19	10	5	2	3	14	13	+1	17	
6	Shandong Luneng Taishan U-19	10	5	2	3	13	13	0	17	
7	Tianjin Teda U-19	10	5	2	3	14	15	−1	17	
8	Guangzhou Evergrande Taobao U-19	10	5	1	4	19	12	+7	16	
9	Tianjin Quanjian U-19	10	4	2	4	12	9	+3	14	
10	Beijing Sinobo Guoan U-19	10	4	2	4	9	12	−3	14	
11	Guangzhou R&F U-19	10	2	5	3	14	14	0	11	
12	Beijing Renhe U-19	10	3	2	5	18	19	−1	11	
13	Changchun Yatai U-19	10	3	2	5	14	20	−6	11	
14	Shanghai Shenxin U-19	10	2	3	5	8	12	−4	9	
15	Shanghai Greenland Shenhua U-19	10	2	3	5	6	15	−9	9	
16	Guizhou Hengfeng U-19	10	2	2	6	6	18	−12	8	
17	Henan Jianye U-19	10	1	4	5	5	10	−5	7	Relegation to Division B
18	Chongqing Dangdai Lifan U-19	10	0	2	8	5	30	−25	2	Relegation to Division B

Updated to match(es) played on 28 May 2018. Source:
Rules for classification: 1) Points; 2) Head-to-head points; 3) Head-to-head goal difference; 4) Head-to-head goals scored; 5) Goal difference; 6) Goals scored; 7) Disciplinary points (1 point for each yellow card, 3 points for each red card); 8) Draw

== Division B ==
=== League table ===
Pos	Team	Pld	W	D	L	GF	GA	GD	Pts	Promotion, qualification or relegation
1	Zhejiang Greentown U-19	10	9	0	1	31	7	+24	27	Promotion to Division A
2	Shenzhen F.C. U-19	10	9	0	1	31	8	+23	27	Promotion to Division A
3	Evergrande Football School U-19	10	8	2	0	41	6	+35	26	
4	Beijing Enterprises Group U-19	10	8	1	1	31	10	+21	25	
5	Luneng Football School U-19	10	7	1	2	36	7	+29	22	
6	Yanbian Funde U-19	10	7	0	3	26	6	+20	21	
7	Qingdao Jonoon U-19	10	4	3	3	26	15	+11	15	
8	Inner Mongolia Shengle Mongolian Sheep U-19	10	4	3	3	25	16	+9	15	
9	Meizhou Meixian Techand U-19	10	5	0	5	18	17	+1	15	
10	Liaoning F.C. U-19	10	4	3	3	13	13	0	15	
11	Wuhan Zall U-19	10	3	2	5	18	11	+7	11	
12	Qingdao Huanghai U-19	10	2	4	4	20	18	+2	10	
13	Shijiazhuang Ever Bright U-19	10	2	3	5	11	18	−7	9	
14	Zhejiang Yiteng U-19	10	1	3	6	12	21	−9	6	
15	Nei Mongol Zhongyou U-19	10	1	3	6	11	24	−13	6	
16	Dalian Transcendence U-19	10	1	0	9	3	39	−36	3	
17	Meizhou Hakka U-19	10	1	0	9	7	46	−39	3	Relegation play-off
18	Heilongjiang Lava Spring U-19	10	0	0	10	0	78	−78	0	Relegation play-off

Updated to match(es) played on 29 May 2018. Source:
Rules for classification: 1) Points; 2) Head-to-head points; 3) Head-to-head goal difference; 4) Head-to-head goals scored; 5) Goal difference; 6) Goals scored; 7) Disciplinary points (1 point for each yellow card, 3 points for each red card); 8) Draw
