= China Resources Beverage =

Chinese beverage company

China Resources Beverage (Holdings) Ltd.
- Native name: 华润饮料（控股）有限公司
- Formerly: Shekou Longhuan
- Type: Public
- Traded as: SEHK: 2460
- Industry: Beverages
- Founded: 1984
- Headquarters: Shenzhen, Guangdong, China
- Parent: China Resources Holdings
- Website: crbeverage.com

China Resources Beverage (Holdings) Ltd.
- Simplified Chinese: 华润怡宝食品饮料（中国）有限公司
- Traditional Chinese: 華潤怡寳食品飲料（中國）有限公司
Transcriptions
Standard Mandarin
- Hanyu Pinyin: Huárùn Yíbǎo Shípǐn Yǐnliào (Zhōngguó) Yǒuxiàngōngsī

China Resources Beverage (Holdings) Ltd. or CR Beverage (simplified Chinese: 华润怡宝; traditional Chinese: 華潤怡寳; pinyin: Huárùn Yíbǎo) is the division of China Resources that sells soft drinks. Its head office is in the north area of the Hi-tech Park (新科技园; Xīn Kējì Yuán) in Nanshan District, Shenzhen. The company maintains regional offices in Beijing, Chengdu, Shanghai, Shenyang, and Shenzhen.

The brands owned by the company include C'estbon (Note: C'est bon means "it's good" in French) (怡宝; 怡寳; Yíbǎo) water, Afternoon (午后; 午後; Wǔhòu) tea, FIRE coffee, Jialinshan (加林山; Jiālínshān) water, Magic, and Zero Pascal. It is also known as China Resources C'estbon Food & Beverage.

On April 18, 2013, China Resources C'estbon sued Nongfu Spring, a rival company, accusing Nongfu of spreading false accusations against C'estbon.

The company went public through an initial public offering in October 2024 and is listed on the Hong Kong Stock Exchange.
