= Frestec =

Frestec (formerly known as Xinfei and then Frestech Electric Co Ltd) was a Chinese home-appliance manufacturer established in 1984. In the mid-1990s, it was the largest producer of refrigerators in China, and it remained in the top three for many years. With the help of Lippincott, in 2012, the company rebranded from "Frestech" to "Frestec" and redesigned the stylized bird of its logo. It was liquidated in 2017 and acquired by the Konka Group where the name remains in use as a brand.
