= The9 =

Shanghai-based online game operator

The9 Ltd.
- Type: Public
- Traded as: Nasdaq: NCTY
- Industry: Video games
- Founded: 1999; 27 years ago
- Headquarters: Shanghai, China
- Area served: China
- Key people: Zhu Jun (chairman and CEO)
- Products: Online game operation
- Revenue: ▲US$10.16 million (2014)
- Net income: ▼US-$17.03 million (2014)
- Number of employees: 498

The9 Ltd. (Chinese: 第九城市) is a Shanghai-based online game operator which had the exclusive licence to operate and distribute World of Warcraft in China (launched in June 2005, it has since become the largest online game), a licence it secured after successfully aiding Webzen Games with the distribution of Mu Online in China. However, in April 2009, Blizzard said that the licence has been moved to NetEase.com.

== Game licences acquired ==
Note: Game licences acquired In rough order of release.

- Mu Online (the partnership has ended)
- World of Warcraft (the partnership has ended)
- Joyful Journey West
- Guild Wars (Chinese version) (The deal with NCsoft ended prematurely 31 March 2008)
- Soul of the Ultimate Nation
- Granado Espada
- Hellgate: London
- Huxley
- Ragnarok Online 2
- FIFA Online 2
- Atlantica Online
- Free Realms
- PlanetSide 2
- Firefall
- Winning Goal
