= Qingdao Youth Football Stadium =

Football stadium in Qingdao, China

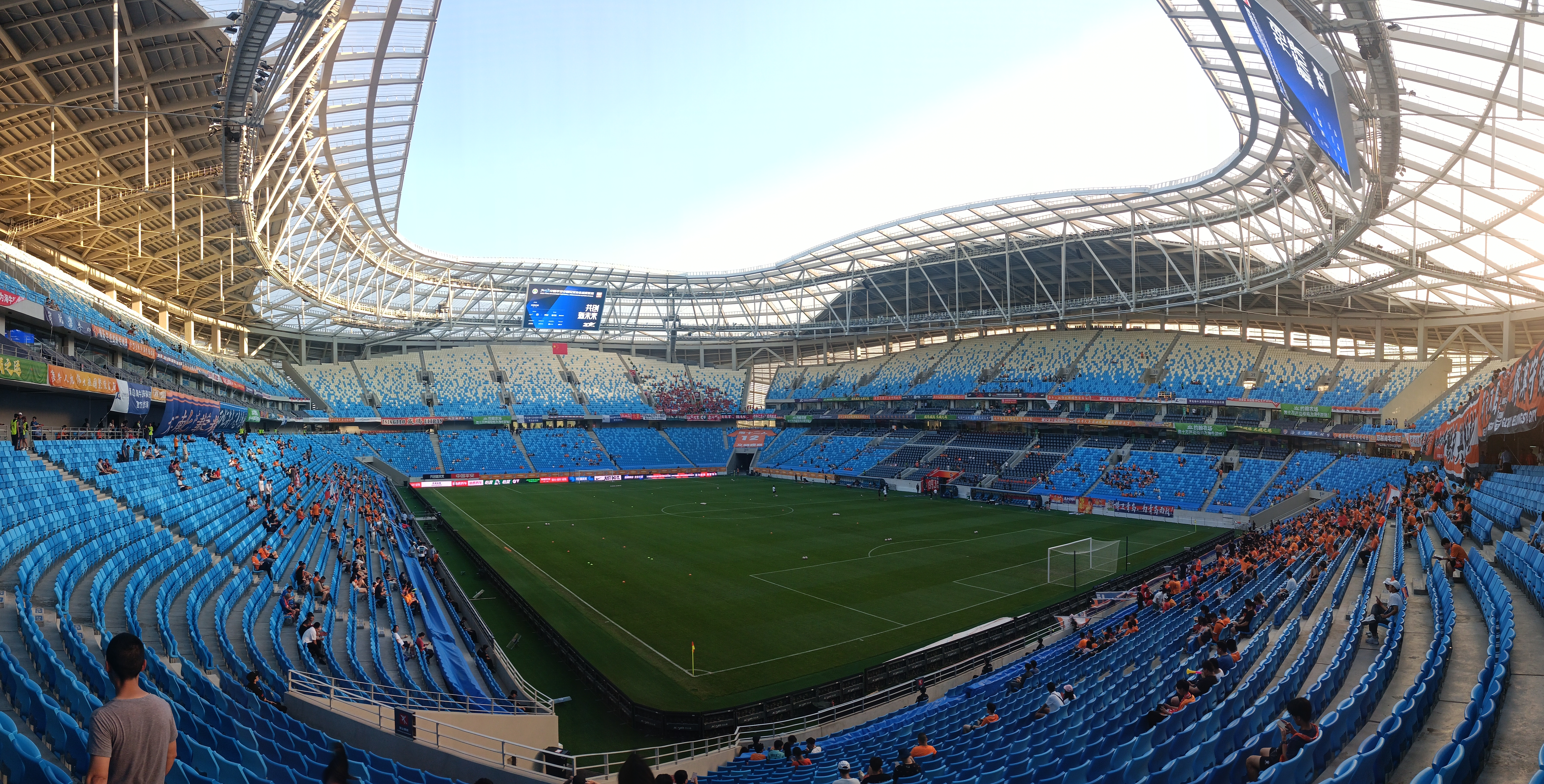
- Interactive map of Qingdao Youth Football Stadium
- Location: Qingdao, Shandong, China
- Coordinates: 36°16′53″N 120°24′35″E
- Owner: Qingdao Municipal Government
- Capacity: 50,000

Construction
- Groundbreaking: 2020
- Opened: 2023
- Cost: CNY3.4 B ($494.5 M)

Tenant
- Qingdao Hainiu (2023–present)

Qingdao Youth Football Stadium (Chinese: 青岛青春足球场; pinyin: Qingdao Qingchun Zuqiuchang) is a football stadium in Qingdao, Shandong, China. It is the home of Chinese Super League club Qingdao Hainiu since 2023.

== Construction ==
Construction of the stadium began on 31 July 2020 and was completed in 8 April 2023.

== Photo Gallery ==
Photos of the Qingdao Youth Football Stadium
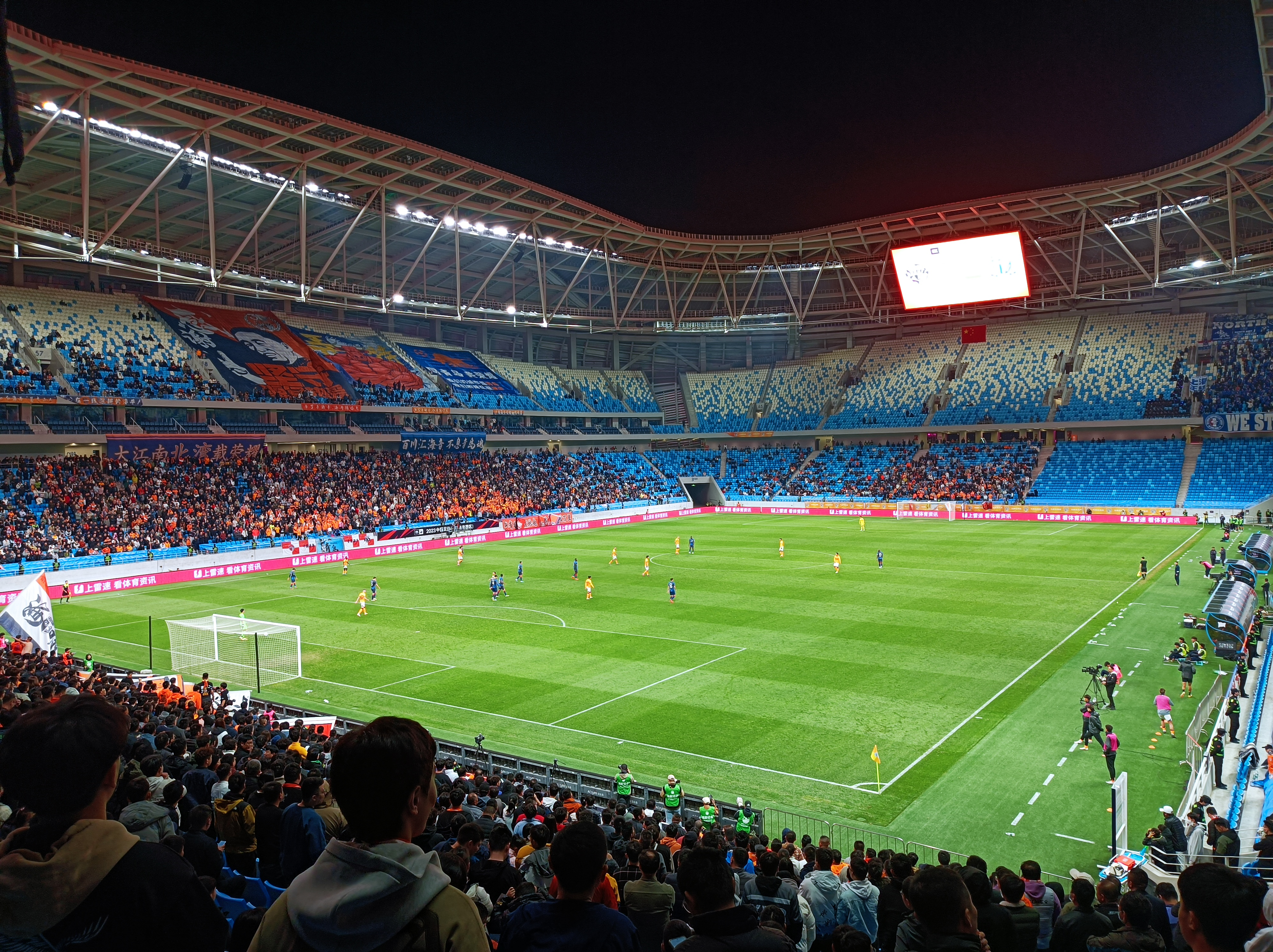
