= Qingdao West Coast University City Sports Center =

Stadium in Qingdao, China

Guzhenkou University City Sports Center
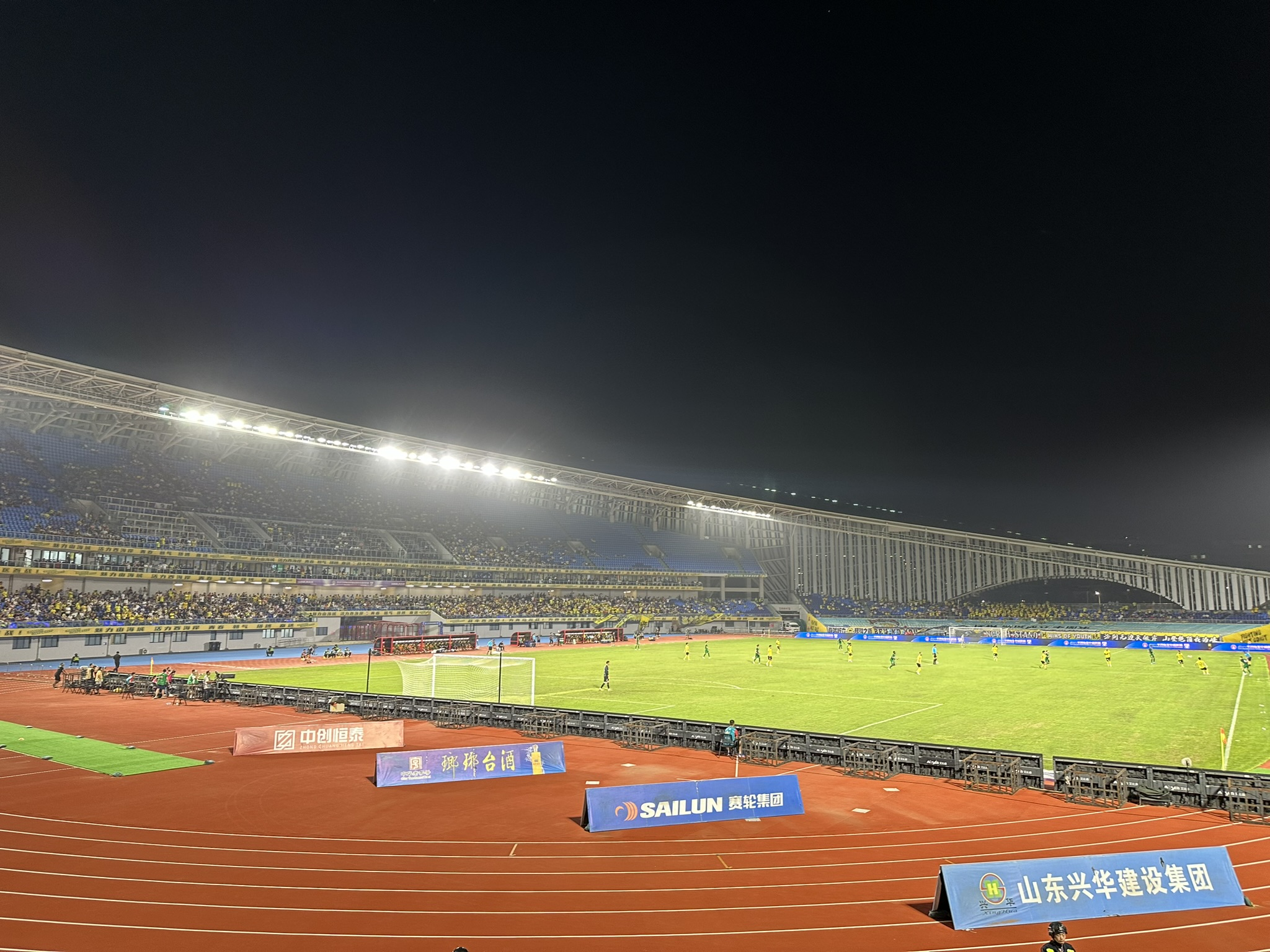
- Interactive map of Guzhenkou University City Sports Center
- Location: Huangdao District, Qingdao, Shandong, China
- Coordinates: 35°47′44″N 120°01′32″E
- Capacity: 27,000

Construction
- Opened: 2023

Tenants
- Qingdao West Coast (2023–); Qingdao Red Lions (2023, 2024); Qingdao Hainiu (2024)

The Guzhenkou University City Sports Center (simplified Chinese: 古镇口大学城体育中心; traditional Chinese: 古鎮口大學城體育中心), also known as the Qingdao West Coast University City Sports Center (Chinese: 青岛西海岸大学城体育中心), is a sports complex that includes a multi-purpose stadium in Huangdao District, Qingdao, China, and the home of Qingdao West Coast and formerly Qingdao Red Lions. The stadium's construction began in 2022 and was completed just after the start of the 2023 season. It is currently used mostly for football matches.
