= WonderKing Online =

- Logo of WonderKing Online
- Developer: To Win Games
- Publishers: KOR: Toz Game; JP: GameHeart
- Platform: Windows
- Release: KOR: February 19, 2007 (Open Beta); JP: November 16, 2007; NA: January 7, 2010; GER: January 19, 2010; PHI: March 5, 2010; EU: April 28, 2012
- Genre: Fantasy MMORPG
- Mode: Multiplayer

WonderKing Online (Korean: 원더킹 Japanese: ワンダーキング) is a free-of-charge, 2D, side-scrolling massively multiplayer online role-playing game created by the South Korean company ToWinGames.

== Gameplay ==
WonderKing was a MMORPG which centered on venturing throughout an expansive world, fighting various monsters in real-time combat, in a style similar to side-scrolling adventure platform games from the 32-bit genre. The players fought monsters and completed quests, in the process acquiring in-game currency called "Zed", experience points (EXP), and various items. Players could kill monsters alone or form a party with up to five total characters. Loot was shared based on relative damage and level of characters in the party, with more awarded to higher level members.

WonderKing used a 2D scrolling viewpoint similar to a platform game. The controls for the game were executed using the keyboard and mouse. The keyboard was used for many game functions, and much of it could be rearranged to suit users' needs. The mouse was mainly used to trigger non-player characters (NPCs) and manipulate items.

WonderKing characters existed in "servers". Players were allowed to create up to 3 characters in each server. Each server, similar in content to each other in the same version, was divided at fifteen channels, between which characters could freely switch. The option to transfer characters between servers was later disabled.

=== Characters ===
On the character creation screen players could choose which class they wanted to play. Starting classes included Swordsman, Mage, Thief, and Scout. The Korean servers also included a robot-riding Machine class. New players began on a map called Tutorial, which explained the basic game commands to the players. Further class progression was only allowed within the scope of the class chosen at character creation. The only time the classes split again was during the first class advancement where each Swordsman, Mage, Thief, or Scout had to choose between two "sub-classes". A Swordsman could become a Knight or Warrior; Mage as a Priest or a Wizard; Thief as a Rogue or Ninja; and a Scout as Archer or Gunner.

In addition to combat stats, characters had "attraction". Once characters reached level 15, they could increase the attractiveness of any other character once per day. A character could not increase the attraction of the same character more than once per month.

Some WonderKing servers had a feature that tracked players total ranking, job ranking, and world ranking. Rank information was available from the region website of the player. Titles also existed for the North American version of WonderKing for the PvP system. PvP Titles were gained from experience rewarded from winning or losing PvP matches in a similar way to the leveling system.

The highest level in the game was 140, while Ignited Games worked on implementing the 3rd class skills. The class skills were Beginner class skills, 1st Upgrade Skills at level 30, and 2nd Upgrade skills at level 80.

=== Guilds ===
Players could form Guilds with other players. Creating a Guild cost a certain amount of Zed, depending on the version played and where the Guild Creation Item was purchased. The purpose of a guild was to make it easier to find and chat with other players, connect with other players, promote cooperation, and battle using teamwork. Members had their guild's name listed above their character name. The size of the guild was determined by half the level of the guild master.

=== Quests ===
There were over a hundred quests available, each with different prerequisites; most quests required the player to attain a certain level or complete another specific quest. Most quests required the player to recover a certain amount of loot attained from monsters or to cross an obstacle course. Some quests were repeated, although the reward(s) and given EXP were different from those achieved during the first completion.

Jump quests were a unique type of quest where a character would start from one area of the map and used timed jumps to get from one to another specific platform. Players had to avoid enemies and obstacles that could knock them off of the platforms. Unlike MapleStory, some skills, abilities, clothing, and items that increase jumping distance or speed had an effect during these quests.

=== Economy ===
Items were acquired from monster drops, purchased from other characters or shops, or obtained as rewards for completing a quest. These items were used for various purposes. Players were also able to trade items.

Since WonderKing was free, the developers introduced the Item Mall to generate revenue. This was a virtual shop where players could buy items using real money. Most Item Mall items expired after a certain period of time. Pets, modeled after animals, mythical creatures, and Zodiac signs, such as bunnies, dragons, and pandas followed the owner around and could be equipped to pick up a loot dropped by enemies. Mounts were also available from the Item Mall and required an item called Mount Fuel to use. Mount Fuel was purchased and only lasted a certain amount of time when used.

The Open Market was a place for people who wanted to sell their items to other players. Miniature shops could be set up in this area, allowing people to browse their supplies. Snack Stalls, which were required to open a shop, were available through certain Miscellaneous Item Selling NPCs as well as the Item Mall. One player could meet with other players located in other towns, provided the town had an Open Market entrance, but the Open Market could not be used to travel between towns.

Real money trading between players was prohibited in WonderKing, and this resulted in a ban. This included trading Zed (in-game currency) with Gcoin Items (items bought with real money).

=== World ===
The overall map of WonderKing

There were six main locations WonderKing: Elgaill Island, Francis, WonderPlus, Hellen Town, Nagpha Swamp, and Lamupel Highlands. The beginner-friendly island featured low leveled monsters and short tutorial quests to introduce players to different aspects of gameplay. Players could take a boat from the Elgaill Docks located on the northern side of the Elgaill Island that took them to the Francis Docks on the Francis map.

== Events ==
Events varied and some events offered the prize, usually an item of some sorts. Users were notified of an upcoming event by a scrolling box at the top of the game screen. Events were known to bring an influx of players to the event's respective locations, which generally caused massive connection lag and sometimes even disconnections. The large amount of special effects during an event could significantly slow down the player's PC.

Occasionally, certain versions of the game held events that celebrated a certain event in real-life or an event specific to that version, such as a holidays or Facebook events. During these events, certain aspects of the game were modified in celebration; for example, the Wonder Day experience rate, Friends Referral event or special new items that were released.

=== Player vs. Player ===
The North American version of WonderKing featured a PvP system, which was under development by Ignited Games. Players could face off against each other in 1v1 combat. There was also a Guild PvP feature that was in development and was often referred to as GvG. Players faced each other on specific maps that could only be accessed by challenging another player. There were 4 maps and an option to randomly select the map. The damage done by players was reduced when they faced each other, but HP and MP remained unchanged and were well balanced so that the difference in level did not affect a player's chance of victory. For example, a level 30 player had the same chance to beat a level 100 player as a level 100 player to defeat a level 30 player. There was also a Battleground system and an NPC named Benson who played a major role in this feature. There was only one Battleground map.

=== Transportation ===
In WonderKing, there was an NPC named Wapi who teleported players to towns and places for a certain price (in Zed). Wapi was in all towns, but not in all locations where he could teleport players. Not all prices were the same when traveling back and forth between the towns. Wapi also gave a discount for players below level 10.

=== Mining ===
Mining was major implementation in WonderKing Online. Each player could purchase pick axes from the NPC named Dozer located near each Mining Site entrance. The Mining Site was similar how the Open Market worked, as players could enter from each town that had the portal to the Mining Site, but could not use the Mining Site to travel between different towns. When mining the players had to have pickaxes in their inventory which they stacked up to 10 per inventory slot. Each time a pickaxe was used (to start the mining process, by default the key to press was 'B') a bar appeared showing number of pickaxes in inventory and loading bar. The loading bar told the player how long until the next pickaxe will be used. Each pickaxe had a chance to find a mineral or ore, and was also possible to find nothing, as well as finding more than one ore or mineral on the same pickaxe usage.

=== Monster Book ===
The Monster Book in WonderKing could be used to collect items called Monster Cards that dropped from various monsters and there were specific cards for each level range. To complete a set of cards, the players had to find parts A, B, and C of the set. Once this was completed, the player could use the three pieces to transform into a monster for a certain period of time. Players could also move around and fight in that costume. It disappeared upon death or once time ran out. Certain cards were also available in the Item Mall. Applied transformations were canceled anytime by pressing the "Cancel" button in the Monster Book tab.

== Shutdown ==
Due to legal problems which prevented the developers releasing new content such as classes, maps, and mobs, plus a massive amount of hackers & exploiters, Ignited Games decided to temporarily close the game. Although they stated that the game would be available once everything is back to normal between Ignited and Ryu&Soft, WonderKing was shut down in December 2011.

Ignited Games stated in 2013 that they considered a negotiation with Ryu&Soft and that the pair were in open communication, but nothing came in fruition since 2019.
