= China national football team results (2010–2019) =

This article lists the results for the China PR national football team between 2010 and 2019.

Key
Win
Draw
Defeat

== 2010 ==
Date	Venue	Opponents	Score	Competition	Scorers
6 January	Hangzhou, China	Syria	0–0	2011 AFC Asian Cup qualification	
14 January	Hanoi, Vietnam	Vietnam	2–1	2011 AFC Asian Cup qualification	Yang Xu, Zhang Linpeng
6 February	Tokyo, Japan	Japan	0–0	2010 East Asian Football Championship	
10 February	Tokyo, Japan	South Korea	3–0	2010 East Asian Football Championship	Yu Hai, Gao Lin, Deng Zhuoxiang
14 February	Tokyo, Japan	Hong Kong	2–0	2010 East Asian Football Championship	Qu Bo(2)
3 March	Coimbra, Portugal	Portugal	0–2^{1}	Friendly	
4 June	Saint-Pierre, Réunion	France	1–0	Friendly	Deng Zhuoxiang
26 June	Kunming, China	Tajikistan	4–0	Friendly	Yu Hanchao (2), Yan Xiangchuang, Qu Bo
11 August	Nanning, China	Bahrain	1–1	Friendly	Yu Hai
3 September	Zhengzhou, China	Iran	0–2	Friendly	
7 September	Nanjing, China	Paraguay	1–1	Friendly	Gao Lin
8 October	Kunming, China	Syria	2–1	Friendly	Zhao Peng, Zhang Linpeng
12 October	Wuhan, China	Uruguay	0–4	Friendly	
17 November	Kunming, China	Latvia	1–0	Friendly	Yang Xu
18 December	Zhuhai, China	Estonia	3–0	Friendly	Du Wei, Yu Hai, Yang Xu
22 December	Guangzhou, China	Macedonia	1–0	Friendly	Deng Zhuoxiang
1:Non FIFA 'A' international match

== 2011 ==
Date	Venue	Opponents	Score	Competition	Scorers
2 January	Doha, Qatar	Iraq	3–2^{1}	Friendly	Hao Junmin, Zhao Peng, Deng Zhuoxiang
8 January	Doha, Qatar	Kuwait	2–0	2011 AFC Asian Cup	Zhang Linpeng, Deng Zhuoxiang
12 January	Doha, Qatar	Qatar	0–2	2011 AFC Asian Cup	
16 January	Doha, Qatar	Uzbekistan	2–2	2011 AFC Asian Cup	Yu Hai, Hao Junmin
25 March	Wuhan, China	New Zealand	1–1	Friendly	Andrew Boyens (o.g.)
26 March	San José, Costa Rica	Costa Rica	2–2	Friendly	Gao Lin (2)
29 March	Wuhan, China	Honduras	3–0	Friendly	Huang Bowen, Yang Xu (2)
5 June	Kunming, China	Uzbekistan	1–0	Friendly	Gao Lin
8 June	Guiyang, China	North Korea	2–0	Friendly	Deng Zhuoxiang, Gao Lin
23 July	Kunming, China	Laos	7–2	2014 FIFA World Cup qualification	Yang Xu (3), Chen Tao (2), Hao Junmin (2)
28 July	Vientiane, Laos	Laos	6–1	2014 FIFA World Cup qualification	Deng Zhuoxiang (2), Yu Hanchao (2), Qu Bo, Yang Xu
10 August	Hefei, China	Jamaica	1–0	Friendly	Zhao Peng
2 September	Kunming, China	Singapore	2–1	2014 FIFA World Cup qualification	Zheng Zhi, Yu Hai
6 September	Amman, Jordan	Jordan	1–2	2014 FIFA World Cup qualification	Hao Junmin
6 October	Shenzhen, China	United Arab Emirates	2–1	Friendly	Sun Xiang, Gao Lin
11 October	Kunming, China	Iraq	0–1	2014 FIFA World Cup qualification	
11 November	Doha, Qatar	Iraq	0–1	2014 FIFA World Cup qualification	
15 November	Singapore	Singapore	4–0	2014 FIFA World Cup qualification	Yu Hai, Li Weifeng, Zheng Zheng (2)
1:Non FIFA 'A' international match

== 2012 ==
Date	Venue	Opponents	Score	Competition	Scorers
22 February	Changsha, China	Kuwait	2–0^{1}	Friendly	Gao Lin, Yu Dabao
29 February	Guangzhou, China	Jordan	3–1	2014 FIFA World Cup qualification	Hao Junmin(2), Yu Dabao
3 June	Seville, Spain	Spain	0–1	Friendly	
8 June	Wuhan, China	Vietnam	3–0	Friendly	Gao Lin (2), Feng Renliang
15 August	Xi'an, China	Ghana	1–1	Friendly	Gao Lin
6 September	Helsingborg, Sweden	Sweden	0–1	Friendly	
10 September	Recife, Brazil	Brazil	0–8	Friendly	
14 November	Shanghai, China	New Zealand	1–1	Friendly	Zhao Peng
1:Non FIFA 'A' international match

== 2013 ==
Date	Venue	Opponents	Score	Competition	Scorers
30 January	Muscat, Oman	Oman	0–1	Friendly	
6 February	Riyadh, Saudi Arabia	Saudi Arabia	1–2	2015 AFC Asian Cup qualification	Zhao Xuri
22 March	Changsha, China	Iraq	1–0	2015 AFC Asian Cup qualification	Yu Dabao
6 June	Hohhot, China	Uzbekistan	1–2	Friendly	Wang Yongpo
11 June	Beijing, China	Netherlands	0–2	Friendly	
15 June	Hefei, China	Thailand	1–5	Friendly	Wang Yongpo
21 July	Seoul, Korea Republic	Japan	3–3	2013 EAFF East Asian Cup	Wang Yongpo (2), Sun Ke
24 July	Hwaseong, Korea Republic	South Korea	0–0	2013 EAFF East Asian Cup	
28 July	Seoul, Korea Republic	Australia	4–3	2013 EAFF East Asian Cup	Yu Dabao, Sun Ke, Yang Xu, Wu Lei
6 September	Tianjin, China	Singapore	6–1	Friendly	Yu Dabao (2), Zheng Long (2), Zhang Xizhe, Sun Ke
10 September	Tianjin, China	Malaysia	2–0	Friendly	Zheng Long, Yang Xu
15 October	Jakarta, Indonesia	Indonesia	1–1	2015 AFC Asian Cup qualification	Wu Xi
15 November	Xi'an, China	Indonesia	1–0	2015 AFC Asian Cup qualification	Wu Lei
19 November	Xi'an, China	Saudi Arabia	0–0	2015 AFC Asian Cup qualification	

== 2014 ==
Date	Venue	Opponents	Score	Competition	Scorers
5 March	Sharjah, United Arab Emirates	Iraq	1–3	2015 AFC Asian Cup qualification	Zhang Xizhe
18 June	Shenyang, China	Macedonia	2–0	Friendly	Yu Hanchao, Gao Di
22 June	Jinan, China	Macedonia	0–0	Friendly	
29 June	Shenzhen, China	Mali	1–3	Friendly	Gao Lin
4 September	Anshan, China	Kuwait	3–1	Friendly	Yang Xu, Yu Hanchao, Wu Lei
9 September	Harbin, China	Jordan	1–1	Friendly	Gao Lin
10 October	Wuhan, China	Thailand	3–0	Friendly	Sinthaweechai (o.g.), Sun Ke, Yang Xu
14 October	Changsha, China	Paraguay	2–1	Friendly	Zheng Zhi, Wu Lei
14 November	Nanchang, China	New Zealand	1–1	Friendly	Zheng Zhi
18 November	Xi'an, China	Honduras	0–0	Friendly	
13 December	Chenzhou, China	Kyrgyzstan	4–0^{1}	Friendly	Ildar Amirov (o.g.), Wu Lei, Yang Xu (2)
17 December	Qingyuan, China	Kyrgyzstan	2–0^{1}	Friendly	Gao Lin, Yang Xu
21 December	Chenzhou, China	Palestine	0–0	Friendly	
1:Non FIFA 'A' international match

== 2015 ==
Date	Venue	Opponents	Score	Competition	Scorers
3 January	Campbelltown, Australia	Oman	4–1	Friendly	Hao Junmin, Yu Hai, Wu Lei, Yang Xu
10 January	Brisbane, Australia	Saudi Arabia	1–0	2015 AFC Asian Cup	Yu Hai
14 January	Brisbane, Australia	Uzbekistan	2–1	2015 AFC Asian Cup	Wu Xi, Sun Ke
18 January	Canberra, Australia	North Korea	2–1	2015 AFC Asian Cup	Sun Ke (2)
22 January	Brisbane, Australia	Australia	0–2	2015 AFC Asian Cup	
27 March	Changsha, China	Haiti	2–2	Friendly	Yang Xu, Yu Dabao
31 March	Nanjing, China	Tunisia	1–1	Friendly	Yu Dabao
16 June	Thimphu, Bhutan	Bhutan	6–0	2018 FIFA World Cup qualification	Yang Xu (3), Yu Dabao (2), Wu Lei
2 August	Wuhan, China	South Korea	0–2	2015 EAFF East Asian Cup	
5 August	Wuhan, China	North Korea	2–0	2015 EAFF East Asian Cup	Yu Dabao, Wang Yongpo (pen)
9 August	Wuhan, China	Japan	1–1	2015 EAFF East Asian Cup	Wu Lei
3 September	Shenzhen, China	Hong Kong	0–0	2018 FIFA World Cup qualification	
8 September	Shenyang, China^{2}	Maldives	3–0	2018 FIFA World Cup qualification	Yu Dabao (2), Zhang Linpeng
8 October	Doha, Qatar	Qatar	0–1	2018 FIFA World Cup qualification	
12 November	Changsha, China	Bhutan	12–0	2018 FIFA World Cup qualification	Yang Xu (4), Yu Dabao (2), Yu Hanchao (2), Wang Yongpo (2), Mei Fang, Zhang Xizhe
17 November	Hong Kong, China	Hong Kong	0–0	2018 FIFA World Cup qualification	
1:Non FIFA 'A' international match 2:Maldives gave up playing at their home stadium

== 2016 ==
Date	Venue	Opponents	Score	Competition	Scorers
24 March	Wuhan, China	Maldives	4–0	2018 FIFA World Cup qualification	Jiang Ning (3), Yang Xu
29 March	Xi'an, China	Qatar	2–0	2018 FIFA World Cup qualification	Huang Bowen, Wu Lei
3 June	Qinhuangdao, China	Trinidad and Tobago	4–2	Friendly	Jiang Ning, Zhang Yuning (2), Hu Rentian
7 June	Dalian, China	Kazakhstan	0–1	Friendly	
1 September	Seoul, South Korea	South Korea	2–3	2018 FIFA World Cup qualification	Yu Hai, Hao Junmin
6 September	Shenyang, China	Iran	0–0	2018 FIFA World Cup qualification	
6 October	Xi'an, China	Syria	0–1	2018 FIFA World Cup qualification	
11 October	Tashkent, Uzbekistan	Uzbekistan	0–2	2018 FIFA World Cup qualification	
15 November	Kunming, China	Qatar	0–0	2018 FIFA World Cup qualification	

== 2017 ==
Date	Venue	Opponents	Score	Competition	Scorers
10 January	Nanning, China	Iceland	0–2	2017 China Cup	
14 January	Nanning, China	Croatia	1–1, 4–3 (pen)	2017 China Cup	Wang Jingbin
23 March	Changsha, China	South Korea	1–0	2018 FIFA World Cup qualification	Yu Dabao
28 March	Tehran, Iran	Iran	0–1	2018 FIFA World Cup qualification	
7 June	Guangzhou, China	Philippines	8–1	Friendly	Ren Hang, Xiao Zhi, Yu Hanchao, Wang Yongpo, Yin Hongbo, Zhang Xizhe, Deng Hanwen (2)
13 June	Krubong, Malaysia^{1}	Syria	2–2	2018 FIFA World Cup qualification	Gao Lin (pen), Wu Xi
31 August	Wuhan, China	Uzbekistan	1–0	2018 FIFA World Cup qualification	Gao Lin (pen)
5 September	Doha, Qatar	Qatar	2–1	2018 FIFA World Cup qualification	Xiao Zhi, Wu Lei
10 November	Guangzhou, China	Serbia	0–2	Friendly	
14 November	Chongqing, China	Colombia	0–4	Friendly	
9 December	Chōfu, Japan	South Korea	2–2	2017 EAFF E-1 Football Championship	Wei Shihao, Yu Dabao
12 December	Chōfu, Japan	Japan	1–2	2017 EAFF E-1 Football Championship	Yu Dabao (pen)
16 December	Chōfu, Japan	North Korea	1–1	2017 EAFF E-1 Football Championship	Wei Shihao
1:Syria played their home matches outside Syria due to security concerns from the Syrian Civil War.

== 2018 ==
Date	Venue	Opponents	Score	Competition	Scorers
22 March	Nanning, China	Wales	0–6	2018 China Cup	
26 March	Nanning, China	Czech Republic	1–4	2018 China Cup	Fan Xiaodong
26 May	Nanjing, China	Myanmar	1–0	Friendly	Wu Lei
2 June	Bangkok, Thailand	Thailand	2–0	Friendly	Wu Lei (2)
6 September	Doha, Qatar	Qatar	0–1	Friendly	
10 September	Manama, Bahrain	Bahrain	0–0	Friendly	
13 October	Suzhou, China	India	0–0	Friendly	
16 October	Nanjing, China	Syria	2–0	Friendly	Wu Lei, Gao Lin
20 November	Haikou, China	Palestine	1–1	Friendly	Feng Xiaoting
24 December	Doha, Qatar	Iraq	1–2	Friendly	Wu Lei (pen)
28 December	Doha, Qatar	Jordan	1–1	Friendly	Wu Xi

== 2019 ==
Date	Venue	Opponents	Score	Competition	Scorers
7 January 2019	Al Ain, United Arab Emirates	Kyrgyzstan	2–1	2019 AFC Asian Cup	Matyash (o.g.), Yu Dabao
11 January 2019	Abu Dhabi, United Arab Emirates	Philippines	3–0	2019 AFC Asian Cup	Wu Lei (2), Yu Dabao
16 January 2019	Abu Dhabi, United Arab Emirates	South Korea	0–2	2019 AFC Asian Cup	
20 January 2019	Al Ain, United Arab Emirates	Thailand	2–1	2019 AFC Asian Cup	Xiao Zhi, Gao Lin
24 January 2019	Abu Dhabi, United Arab Emirates	Iran	0–3	2019 AFC Asian Cup	
21 March 2019	Nanning, China	Thailand	0–1	2019 China Cup	
25 March 2019	Nanning, China	Uzbekistan	0–1	2019 China Cup	
7 June 2019	Guangzhou, China	Philippines	2–0	Friendly	Wu Xi, Zhang Xizhe
11 June 2019	Guangzhou, China	Tajikistan	1–0	Friendly	Yang Xu
30 August 2019	Xianghe, Hebei, China	Myanmar	4–1^{1}	Friendly	Wu Xi (2), Yang Xu, Feng Jin
10 September 2019	Malé, Maldives	Maldives	5–0	2022 FIFA World Cup qualification	Wu Xi, Wu Lei, Yang Xu, Elkeson (2)
10 October 2019	Guangzhou, China	Guam	7–0	2022 FIFA World Cup qualification	Yang Xu (4), Wu Lei, Wu Xi, Elkeson
15 October 2019	Bacolod, Philippines	Philippines	0–0	2022 FIFA World Cup qualification	
14 November 2019	Dubai, United Arab Emirates	Syria	1–2	2022 FIFA World Cup qualification	Wu Lei
10 December 2019	Busan, South Korea	Japan	1–2	2019 EAFF E-1 Football Championship	Dong Xuesheng
15 December 2019	Busan, South Korea	South Korea	0–1	2019 EAFF E-1 Football Championship	
18 December 2019	Busan, South Korea	Hong Kong	2–0	2019 EAFF E-1 Football Championship	Ji Xiang, Zhang Xizhe
1:Non FIFA 'A' international match

== Head-to-head records ==
China national football team head-to-head records (2010–2019)
Opponent	Pld	W	D	L	GF	GA	GD	Pts	Confederation
Australia	2	1	0	1	4	5	–1	3	AFC
Bahrain	2	0	2	0	1	1	0	2	AFC
Bhutan	2	2	0	0	18	0	+18	6	AFC
Brazil	1	0	0	1	0	8	–8	0	CONMEBOL
Colombia	1	0	0	1	0	4	–4	0	CONMEBOL
Costa Rica	1	0	1	0	2	2	0	1	CONCACAF
Croatia	1	0	1	0	1	1	0	1	UEFA
Czech Republic	1	0	0	1	1	4	–3	0	UEFA
Estonia	1	1	0	0	3	0	+3	3	UEFA
France	1	1	0	0	1	0	+1	3	UEFA
Ghana	1	0	1	0	1	1	0	1	CAF
Guam	1	1	0	0	7	0	+7	3	AFC
Haiti	1	0	1	0	2	2	0	1	CONCACAF
Honduras	2	1	1	0	3	0	+3	4	CONCACAF
Hong Kong	4	2	2	0	4	0	+4	8	AFC
Iceland	1	0	0	1	0	2	–2	0	UEFA
India	1	0	1	0	0	0	0	1	AFC
Indonesia	2	1	1	0	2	1	+1	4	AFC
Iran	4	0	1	3	0	6	–6	1	AFC
Iraq	5	2	0	3	5	6	–1	6	AFC
Jamaica	1	1	0	0	1	0	+1	3	CONCACAF
Japan	4	0	2	2	5	6	–1	2	AFC
Jordan	4	1	2	1	6	5	+1	5	AFC
Kazakhstan	1	0	0	1	0	1	–1	0	UEFA
Kuwait	2	2	0	0	5	1	+4	6	AFC
Kyrgyzstan	1	1	0	0	2	1	+1	3	AFC
Laos	2	2	0	0	13	3	+10	6	AFC
Latvia	1	1	0	0	1	0	+1	3	UEFA
North Macedonia	3	2	1	0	3	0	+3	7	UEFA
Malaysia	1	1	0	0	2	0	+2	3	AFC
Maldives	3	3	0	0	12	0	+12	9	AFC
Mali	1	0	0	1	1	3	–2	0	CAF
Myanmar	1	1	0	0	1	0	+1	3	AFC
Netherlands	1	0	0	1	0	2	–2	0	UEFA
New Zealand	2	0	2	0	2	2	0	2	OFC
North Korea	4	3	1	0	7	2	+5	10	AFC
Oman	1	1	0	0	4	1	+3	3	AFC
Palestine	2	0	2	0	1	1	0	2	AFC
Paraguay	2	1	1	0	3	2	+1	4	CONMEBOL
Philippines	4	3	1	0	13	1	+12	10	AFC
Qatar	7	2	1	4	5	7	–2	7	AFC
Saudi Arabia	3	1	1	1	2	2	0	4	AFC
Serbia	1	0	0	1	0	2	–2	0	UEFA
Singapore	3	3	0	0	12	2	+10	9	AFC
South Korea	6	2	1	3	6	8	–2	7	AFC
Spain	1	0	0	1	0	1	–1	0	UEFA
Sweden	1	0	0	1	0	1	–1	0	UEFA
Syria	5	2	2	1	7	4	+3	8	AFC
Tajikistan	2	2	0	0	5	0	+5	6	AFC
Thailand	5	3	0	2	9	7	+2	9	AFC
Trinidad and Tobago	1	1	0	0	4	2	+2	3	CONCACAF
Tunisia	1	0	1	0	1	1	0	1	CAF
United Arab Emirates	1	1	0	0	2	1	+1	3	AFC
Uruguay	1	0	0	1	0	4	–4	0	CONMEBOL
Uzbekistan	5	2	1	2	5	6	–1	7	AFC
Vietnam	2	2	0	0	5	1	+4	6	AFC
Wales	1	0	0	1	0	6	–6	0	UEFA
Total	108	52	27	29	200	114	+86	183	

== See also ==
- China PR national football team results
