= Zhang Wentao =

Chinese footballer

Zhang Wentao 张文涛
Personal information
- Full name: Zhang Wentao
- Date of birth: 14 April 1993 (age 33)
- Place of birth: Guiyang, Guizhou, China
- Height: 1.87 m (6 ft 2 in)
- Position: Centre-back

Team information
- Current team: Guizhou Guiyang Athletic
- Number: 27

Youth career
- Genbao Football Base
- 2013: Shanghai SIPG
- 2014: Shanghai Shenxin

Senior career*
Years	Team	Apps	(Gls)
2011–2012	Shanghai Zobon		
2015–2018	Shanghai Shenxin	54	(1)
2019–2022	Henan Jianye	18	(0)
2021	→ Wuhan Three Towns (loan)	14	(1)
2022-2023	Wuhan Three Towns	19	(1)
2024	Guangxi Pingguo Haliao	16	(0)
2025–	Guizhou Guiyang Athletic	41	(2)
- * Club domestic league appearances and goals as of 11 August 2026

Zhang Wentao (Chinese: 张文涛; born 14 April 1993) is a Chinese footballer who currently plays as centre-back for Guizhou Guiyang Athletic.

== Club career ==
Zhang Wentao started his professional football career in 2011 when he joined Shanghai Zobon for the 2011 China League Two campaign. The club would be taken over by Shanghai SIPG and he was placed in their youth team where he failed to break into their senior team. Despite this he represented Shanghai at the 2013 National Games of China and was part of the team that won the football at the tournament. A move to Chinese Super League club Shanghai Shenxin in December 2013 would follow. Zhang was promoted to Shanghai Shenxin first team squad in 2015. On 18 April 2015, he made his Super League debut in a 4–1 home defeat against Changchun Yatai.

Zhang transferred to Chinese Super League side Henan Jianye on 15 January 2019. He would make his debut in a league game on 3 March 2019 against Dalian Yifang F.C. where he came on as a late substitute for Zhong Jinbao in a 1-1 draw. After two seasons with the club he would struggle to establish himself as a vital member of the team and he would go on to be loaned out to second tier club Wuhan Three Towns in the 2021 China League One campaign. The move would turn out to be a big successes and he would go on to establish himself as a vital member of the team and help aid the club to win the league title and gain promotion as the club entered the top tier for the first time in their history. The following campaign Wuhan would make the move permanent and he would be part of the squad that won the 2022 Chinese Super League title.

== Career statistics ==
Statistics accurate as of match played 11 August 2026.

Appearances and goals by club, season and competition
Club	Season	League			National Cup		Continental		Other		Total	
Club	Season	Division	Apps	Goals	Apps	Goals	Apps	Goals	Apps	Goals	Apps	Goals
Shanghai Zobon	2011	China League Two			-		-		-			
Shanghai Zobon	2012	China League Two			0	0	-		-			
Shanghai Zobon	Total				0	0	0	0	0	0		
Shanghai Shenxin	2015	Chinese Super League	12	0	1	0	-		-		13	0
Shanghai Shenxin	2016	China League One	11	1	1	0	-		-		12	1
Shanghai Shenxin	2017	China League One	8	0	2	0	-		-		10	0
Shanghai Shenxin	2018	China League One	23	0	0	0	-		-		23	0
Shanghai Shenxin	Total		54	1	4	0	0	0	0	0	58	1
Henan Jianye	2019	Chinese Super League	12	0	1	0	-		-		13	0
Henan Jianye	2020	Chinese Super League	6	0	1	0	-		-		7	0
Henan Jianye	Total		18	0	2	0	0	0	0	0	20	0
Wuhan Three Towns (loan)	2021	China League One	14	1	1	0	-		-		15	1
Wuhan Three Towns	2022	Chinese Super League	11	1	1	0	-		-		12	1
Wuhan Three Towns	2023	Chinese Super League	8	0	1	0	0	0	0 (Note: Appearances in Chinese FA Super Cup)	0	9	0
Wuhan Three Towns	Total		19	1	2	0	0	0	0	0	21	1
Guangxi Pingguo Haliao	2024	China League One	16	0	2	0	-		-		18	0
Guizhou Guiyang Athletic	2025	China League Two	23	1	2	0	-		-		25	1
Guizhou Guiyang Athletic	2026	China League Two	18	1	0	0	-		-		18	1
Guizhou Guiyang Athletic	Total		41	2	2	0	0	0	0	0	43	2
Total			162	5	13	0	0	0	0	0	175	5

== Honours ==
Wuhan Three Towns

- Chinese Super League: 2022
- China League One: 2021
- Chinese FA Super Cup: 2023
