= China women's national football team results =

This article lists the results of the China women's national football team.

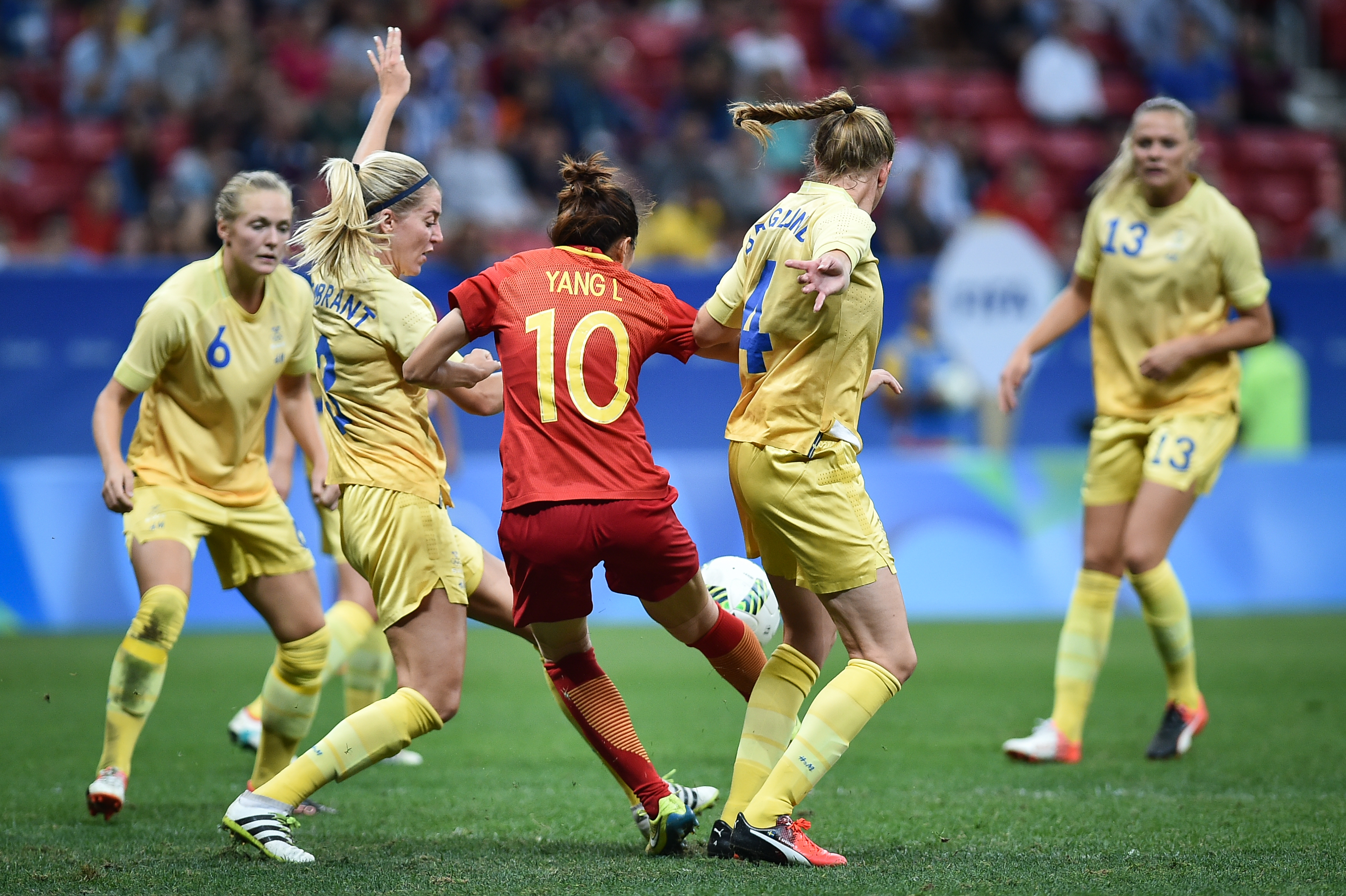
China vs Sweden 2016 Olympic

== Best / Worst Results ==
=== Best ===
As of 30 March 2022

Number	Year	Opponent	Result
1	1995	Philippines	21 – 0
2	1997	Philippines	16 – 0
3	1998	India	16 – 0
4	2018	Tajikistan	16 – 0
5	1999	Guam	15 – 0
6	2000	Guatemala	14 – 0
7	2003	South Africa	13 – 0
8	1995	Hong Kong	12 – 0
9	1999	Hong Kong	12 – 0
10	2003	India	12 – 0
11	2006	Jordan	12 – 0
12	2001	Uzbekistan	11 – 0
13	2003	Uzbekistan	11 – 0
14	2004	Myanmar	11 – 0
15	1986	Malaysia	10 – 0
16	1990	Hong Kong	10 – 0
17	1991	South Korea	10 – 0
18	1997	Chinese Taipei	10 – 0
19	2001	Hong Kong	10 – 0
20	2001	Philippines	10 – 0
21	2018	Mongolia	10 – 0
22	1991	Thailand	10 – 1
23	2010	Jordan	10 – 1
24	1986	Indonesia	9 – 0
25	2004	Guam	9 – 0
26-30		5 Times	8 – 0
31-32		2 Times	8 – 1
33-41		9 Times	7 – 0
42-53		12 Times	6 – 0
54	1986	Yugoslavia	6 – 1
55-71		17 Times	5 – 0
72-74		3 Times	5 – 1
75-82		18 Times	4 – 0
83-84		2 Times	5 – 2
85-93		9 Times	4 – 1
94-121		28 Times	3 – 0
122-127		6 Times	4 – 2
128-151		24 Times	3 – 1

=== Worst ===
As of 30 March 2022

Number	Year	Opponent	Result
1	2004	Germany	0 – 8
2	2021	Netherlands	2 – 8
3	1987	Sweden	0 – 6
4	2023	England	1 – 6
5	2010	Germany	0 – 5
6	2013	United States	0 – 5
7	2021	Brazil	0 – 5
8	2017	Australia	1 – 5
9	1987	Norway	0 – 4
10	2007	Brazil	0 – 4
11	2008	United States	0 – 4
12	2012	United States	0 – 4
13	2013	New Zealand	0 – 4
14	1996	Norway	1 – 4
15	1998	United States	1 – 4
16	1999	Germany	1 – 4
17	2006	United States	1 – 4
18	2007	Iceland	1 – 4
19	2012	United States	1 – 4
20	2012	United States	1 – 4
21	2014	Brazil	1 – 4
22-35		14 Times	0 – 3
36-49		14 Times	1 – 3

== See also ==
- China women's national football team head to head
- China national football team results and fixtures
