= Wu Fei =

Wu Fei may refer to:

- Wu Fei (musician), Chinese American composer, performer, and improviser
- Wu Fei (footballer), Chinese football goalkeeper
- Wu Fei (taikonaut), Chinese taikonaut and member of the People's Liberation Army Astronaut Corps
