= Gao Zhunyi =

Chinese footballer

Gao Zhunyi 高准翼
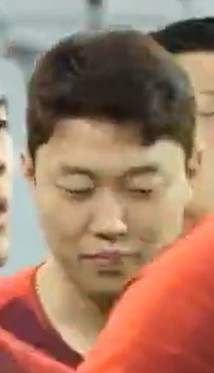
- Gao Zhunyi in 2019

Personal information
- Full name: Gao Zhunyi
- Date of birth: 21 August 1995 (age 31)
- Place of birth: Yanji, Jilin, China
- Height: 1.86 m (6 ft 1 in)
- Positions: Centre-back; full-back

Team information
- Current team: Shandong Taishan
- Number: 33

Youth career
- 2005–2008: Nanyang Brazil Football School
- 2009–2013: Shanghai Luckystar

Senior career*
Years	Team	Apps	(Gls)
2014	Kataller Toyama	17	(1)
2015	Avispa Fukuoka	7	(0)
2015–2016	Shandong Luneng	0	(0)
2016	→ Hebei China Fortune (loan)	23	(0)
2017–2018	Hebei China Fortune	35	(2)
2019–2021	Guangzhou FC	50	(2)
2022–2023	Wuhan Three Towns	41	(1)
2024–	Shandong Taishan	55	(1)

International career^{‡}
2013–2014	China U-19	12	(1)
2015–2018	China U-23	25	(7)
2017–	China	23	(0)
Medal record
Representing China
Men's football
EAFF Championship
Bronze medal – third place	2017 Japan	Team
Bronze medal – third place	2025 South Korea	Team
- * Club domestic league appearances and goals as of 19 November 2026 ‡ National team caps and goals as of 20 June 2023

Gao Zhunyi
- Traditional Chinese: 高準翼
- Simplified Chinese: 高准翼
Transcriptions
Standard Mandarin
- Hanyu Pinyin: Gāo Zhǔnyì
- IPA: [káʊ ʈʂwə̀n.î]

Chinese Korean name
- Chosŏn'gŭl: 고준익
Transcriptions
- Revised Romanization: Go Junik
- McCune–Reischauer: Ko Chunik

Gao Zhunyi (Chinese: 高准翼; Korean: 고준익; born 21 August 1995) is a Chinese professional footballer who currently plays as a centre-back or full-back for Chinese Super League club Shandong Taishan and the China national team.

== Club career ==
=== Youth ===
Gao started his football career when he joined Shanghai Luckystar in 2009.

=== Kataller Toyama ===
On 31 January 2014, he transferred to J2 League side Kataller Toyama, which made him the third Chinese footballer to play in the Japanese professional leagues after Jia Xiuquan and Xu Xiaofei. He made his debut for the club on 26 March 2014 in a 2–1 lost against Yokohama FC, becoming the youngest footballer ever to play for Kataller Toyama at 18-years old. He scored his first goal for the club on 29 April 2014 in a 3–2 win against Matsumoto Yamaga, making him the youngest goalscorer in the club's history at 18 years, 8 months and 8 days.

=== Avispa Fukuoka ===
On 13 January 2015, Gao transferred to fellow J2 League side, Avispa Fukuoka after Kataller Toyama was relegated to the J3 League during the 2014 season. He made his debut for the club on 1 April 2015 in a 2–2 draw against Yokohoma FC.

=== Shandong Luneng ===
On 3 July 2015, Gao transferred to Chinese Super League side Shandong Luneng.

==== Loan to Hebei China Fortune ====
On 25 February 2016, Gao was loaned out to fellow top tier side Hebei China Fortune until 31 January 2017. He made his debut for the club on 4 March 2016 in a 2–1 win against Guangzhou R&F, coming on as a substitute for Dong Xuesheng.

=== Hebei China Fortune ===
In February 2017, Gao permanently transferred to the club after rejecting an offer from Romania Liga I side, CFR Cluj.

=== Guangzhou Evergrande ===
On 2 February 2019, Gao transferred to fellow top tier side Guangzhou Evergrande. He would make his debut for the club in a league game against Tianjin Tianhai on 1 March 2019 in a 3–0 victory. Throughout the season he would go on to establish himself as a vital member within the team and go on to win the 2019 Chinese Super League title with the club.

=== Wuhan Three Towns ===
On 28 April 2022, Gao signed with newly promoted top tier side Wuhan Three Towns. He would go on to make his debut on 12 August 2022, in a league game against Beijing Guoan, which ended in a 5–1 victory. After the game he would go on to establish himself as a regular within the team that won the 2022 Chinese Super League title.

=== Shandong Taishan ===
On 25 January 2024, Gao returned to his former club Shandong Taishan (formerly named Shandong Luneng). On 20 February, he scored his first goal for Shandong in a 4-2 away win against Japanese club Kawasaki Frontale in the second leg of 2023–24 AFC Champions League Round of 16, which saw the team qualify for the quarter-finals for the first time in 8 years.

== International career ==
Gao made his debut for the Chinese national team on 10 January 2017 in a 2–0 loss against Iceland during the 2017 China Cup.

== Personal life ==
Gao Zhunyi is the son of former Chinese international footballer Gao Zhongxun.

== Career statistics ==
=== Club statistics ===
As of 19 November 2026

Appearances and goals by club, season and competition
Club	Season	League			National Cup		Continental		Other		Total	
Club	Season	Division	Apps	Goals	Apps	Goals	Apps	Goals	Apps	Goals	Apps	Goals
Kataller Toyama	2014	J2 League	17	1	1	0	-		-		18	1
Avispa Fukuoka	2015	J2 League	7	0	0	0	-		-		7	0
Shandong Luneng	2015	Chinese Super League	0	0	0	0	-		-		0	0
Hebei China Fortune	2016	Chinese Super League	23	0	2	0	-		-		25	0
Hebei China Fortune	2017	Chinese Super League	19	2	1	0	-		-		20	2
Hebei China Fortune	2018	Chinese Super League	16	0	0	0	-		-		16	0
Hebei China Fortune	Total		58	2	3	0	0	0	0	0	61	2
Guangzhou Evergrande	2019	Chinese Super League	24	0	2	0	7	0	-		33	0
Guangzhou Evergrande	2020	Chinese Super League	11	0	0	0	0	0	-		11	0
Guangzhou Evergrande	2021	Chinese Super League	15	2	0	0	0	0	-		15	2
Guangzhou Evergrande	Total		50	2	2	0	7	0	0	0	59	2
Wuhan Three Towns	2022	Chinese Super League	21	1	0	0	-		-		21	1
Wuhan Three Towns	2023	Chinese Super League	20	0	1	0	4	0	-		25	0
Wuhan Three Towns	Total		41	1	1	0	4	0	0	0	46	1
Wuhan Three Towns	2024	Chinese Super League	19	1	4	0	10	1	-		33	2
Wuhan Three Towns	2025	Chinese Super League	14	0	1	0	1	0	-		16	0
Wuhan Three Towns	2026	Chinese Super League	22	0	2	0	-		-		24	0
Wuhan Three Towns	Total		55	1	7	0	11	1	0	0	73	2
Career total			204	7	14	0	22	1	0	0	240	2

=== International statistics ===
National team
Year	Apps	Goals
2017	4	0
2018	0	0
2019	4	0
2020	0	0
2021	1	0
2022	2	0
2023	3	0
2024	4	0
2025	2	0
2026	3	0
Total	23	0

== Honours ==
Guangzhou Evergrande

- Chinese Super League: 2019

Wuhan Three Towns

- Chinese Super League: 2022
- Chinese FA Super Cup: 2023
