= 2023 Chinese FA Super Cup =

Wuhan Three Towns	Shandong Taishan
2	0
- Date: 8 April 2023
- Venue: Yellow Dragon Sports Center, Hangzhou
- Man of the Match: Abdul-Aziz Yakubu
- Referee: Ma Ning
- Attendance: 26,998

2023 Chinese FA Super Cup (Chinese: 2023中国足球协会超级杯) was the 18th Chinese FA Super Cup, an annual football match contested by the winners of the previous season's Chinese Super League and FA Cup competitions. The match was played between Wuhan Three Towns, champions of the 2022 Chinese Super League, and Shandong Taishan, the winner of the 2022 Chinese FA Cup.

Wuhan Three Towns won their first Chinese FA Super Cup title at their first attempt after beating Shandong Taishan 2–0.

== Match ==
=== Details ===
8 April 2023
19:35 CST

Wuhan Three Towns	2–0	Shandong Taishan
Yakubu 10'; Xie Pengfei 56'	Report

Yellow Dragon Sports Center, Hangzhou
Attendance: 26,998
Referee: Ma Ning

GK	22	(China) Liu Dianzuo
CB	2	(Brazil) Wallace	(yellow card) 31'
CB	18	(China) Liu Yiming
CB	20	(China) Gao Zhunyi	(yellow card) 62'
RM	25	(China) Deng Hanwen
CM	10	(Romania) Nicolae Stanciu
CM	21	(China) He Chao		(substituted off) 78'
LM	4	(China) Wei Shihao	(yellow card) 90+2'	(substituted off) 90'
RW	30	(China) Xie Pengfei		(substituted off) 68'
LW	11	(Brazil) Davidson
CF	9	(Ghana) Abdul-Aziz Yakubu		(substituted off) 90'
Substitutes:
GK	1	(China) Wu Fei
DF	19	(China) Zhang Wentao
DF	2	(China) Li Yang
DF	23	(China) Ren Hang
DF	32	(China) Lü Haidong
DF	28	(China) Denny Wang		(substituted on) 90'
MF	12	(China) Zhang Xiaobin		(substituted on) 78'
MF	6	(China) Luo Senwen
MF	8	(China) Yan Dinghao		(substituted on) 68'
MF	40	(China) Zhang Hui
FW	7	(Brazil) Ademilson		(substituted on) 90'
FW	29	(China) Tao Qianglong
Manager:
(Spain) Pedro Morilla

GK	18	(China) Han Rongze
CB	4	(Brazil) Jadson
CB	27	(China) Shi Ke
CB	5	(China) Zheng Zheng		(substituted off) 46'
LB	39	(China) Song Long
RB	37	(China) Ji Xiang		(substituted off) 56'
CM	28	(South Korea) Son Jun-ho	(red card) 88'
CM	10	(Brazil) Moisés
CM	22	(Portugal) Pedro Delgado		(substituted off) 40'
CF	29	(China) Chen Pu	(yellow card) 26'	(substituted off) 64'
CF	7	(China) Guo Tianyu		(substituted off) 55'
Substitutes:
GK	26	(China) Liu Shibo
DF	40	(China) Shi Songchen
DF	35	(China) Huang Zhengyu
DF	19	(China) Sun Guowen		(substituted on) 40'
DF	11	(China) Liu Yang		(substituted on) 64'
DF	16	(China) Li Hailong
DF	6	(China) Wang Tong		(substituted on) 46'
MF	15	(China) Qi Tianyu
MF	25	(Belgium) Marouane Fellaini		(substituted on) 55'
MF	36	(China) Duan Liuyu
FW	20	(China) Fernandinho
FW	21	(China) Liu Binbin		(substituted on) 56'
Manager:
(China) Hao Wei

Man of the Match:
(Ghana) Abdul-Aziz Yakubu
Assistant referees:
Zhou Fei ( FA)
Zhang Cheng ( FA)
Fourth official:
Fu Ming ( FA)
Video assistant referee:
Wang Di ( FA)
Assistant video assistant referees:
Tang Shunqi ( FA)

Match rules

- 90 minutes.
- 30 minutes of extra time if necessary.
- Penalty shoot-out if scores still level.
- Maximum of five substitutions, with a sixth allowed in extra time.
- Maximum of four foreign players on the pitch.

Chinese FA Super Cup
2023 winners

First title

== See also ==
- 2022 Chinese Super League
- 2022 Chinese FA Cup
