= He Xinjie =

Chinese footballer (born 2002)

Personal information
- Date of birth: 17 February 2002 (age 24)
- Place of birth: Jinjiang, Fujian, China
- Height: 1.82 m (6 ft 0 in)
- Position: Midfielder

Team information
- Current team: Wuhan Three Towns B
- Number: 8

Youth career
- 2013–2020: Evergrande Football School

Senior career*
Years	Team	Apps	(Gls)
2020–2021	Guangzhou Evergrande	0	(0)
2021–2022	Sporting de Gijón B	0	(0)
2021	→ Gijón Industrial (loan)	3	(0)
2022–2024	Guangzhou FC	9	(0)
2023–2024	→ Haikou Mingcheng (loan)	46	(6)
2025–	Wuhan Three Towns B	28	(4)

International career
- China U16
2020	China U19		
- * Club domestic league appearances and goals as of 00:01, 31 January 2023 (UTC)

He Xinjie (Chinese: 何鑫杰; born 17 February 2002), known in Spain as Valerón, is a Chinese footballer currently playing as a midfielder for China League Two club Wuhan Three Towns B.

== Club career ==
Born in Jinjiang, Fujian, He started playing football at the age of six. At the age of eleven, he was approached by Hangzhou Greentown, Shandong Luneng and the Evergrande Football School, with He opting to join the latter. After one Chinese FA Cup appearance for Guangzhou FC, Wu moved to Spain to join Sporting de Gijón, alongside teammates Jiang Weilang and Wu Junjie. In his first season, he was loaned to affiliate club Gijón Industrial in the Tercera División RFEF.

He returned to Guangzhou in 2022, making his debut in the Chinese Super League on 23 August of the same year.

== International career ==
He has represented China at under-16 and under-19 level.

== Career statistics ==
=== Club ===
As of 31 January 2023.

Appearances and goals by club, season and competition
Club	Season	League			Cup		Other		Total	
Club	Season	Division	Apps	Goals	Apps	Goals	Apps	Goals	Apps	Goals
Guangzhou FC	2020	Chinese Super League	0	0	1 (Note: Appearances in the Chinese FA Cup)	0	0	0	1	0
Guangzhou FC	2021	Chinese Super League	0	0	0	0	0	0	0	0
Guangzhou FC	Total		0	0	1	0	0	0	1	0
Sporting de Gijón B	2021–22	Tercera División RFEF	0	0	0	0	0	0	0	0
Gijón Industrial (loan)	2021–22	Tercera División RFEF	3	0	0	0	0	0	3	0
Guangzhou FC	2022	Chinese Super League	9	0	1	0	0	0	10	0
Career total			12	0	2	0	0	0	14	0
