= Wu Fei (footballer) =

Chinese footballer (born 1989)

Personal information
- Date of birth: 2 July 1989 (age 37)
- Place of birth: Hubei, China
- Height: 1.79 m (5 ft 10 in)
- Position: Goalkeeper

Senior career*
Years	Team	Apps	(Gls)
2009–2013	Wuhan Zall	3	(0)
2014–2016	Jiangxi Liansheng	46	(0)
2017–2018	Shenzhen Ledman	25	(0)
2019–2023	Wuhan Three Towns	63	(0)
- * Club domestic league appearances and goals as of 11 January 2023

Wu Fei (吴飞, born 2 July 1989) is a Chinese former footballer who played as a goalkeeper.

== Club career ==
=== Wuhan Zall ===
Wu Fei, a product of Hubei youth academy, started his professional career in 2009 at Hubei Greenery, a third tier Chinese football club. On September 5, 2009, he made his debut for the team in a league game that ended in a 1–0 win over Ningbo Hua'ao. He would go on to gain promotion with the club at the end of the season as the club finished runners-up at the end of the campaign. He would play understudy to Wu Yan and then Zhu Zisen as he spent most of his time on the bench during his five years spell at the club.

=== Jiangxi Liansheng ===
Following Wuhan Zall's relegation from China Super League in 2013, he joined Jiangxi Liansheng along with his teammates Xin Feng, Ao Feifan and Li Gang. In 2014, he played a crucial part in Jiangxi Liansheng's promotion to China League One. The following season with the club was not a success and the team were immediately relegated at the end of the campaign. In 2016, Wu lost his position to Wen Zhixiang and made only 2 appearances.

=== Shenzhen Ledman ===
In 2017 he joined another China League Two side Shenzhen Ledman and become the regular goalkeeper for the team in China League Two. His contract was terminated after the end of 2018 season as Shenzhen Ledman became defunct.

=== Wuhan Three Towns ===
On February 15, 2019, Wu Fei signed for China League Two side Wuhan Three Towns on a free transfer. He would immediately establish himself as their first choice goalkeeper and in the following season he would aid them in winning the league division. The following season he would fight for the goalkeeping position with on loan goalkeeper Geng Xiaofeng and be part of the squad that won the second tier title within the 2021 China League One campaign. With the club in the top tier for the first time they would bring in experienced Chinese international goalkeeper Liu Dianzuo as their first choice goalkeeper, however Wu would go on to make his Chinese Super League debut on 17 August 2022 against Henan Songshan Longmen in a 3–0 victory. Throughout the season he would be part of the squad that won the 2022 Chinese Super League title.

On 21 January 2025, Wu announced his retirement from professional football.

On 29 January 2026, Wu was given a lifetime ban for match-fixing by the Chinese Football Association.

== Career statistics ==
Statistics accurate as of match played 11 January 2023.

Appearances and goals by club, season and competition
Club	Season	League			National Cup		Continental		Other		Total	
Club	Season	Division	Apps	Goals	Apps	Goals	Apps	Goals	Apps	Goals	Apps	Goals
Wuhan Zall	2009	China League Two	1	0	-		-		-		1	0
Wuhan Zall	2010	China League One	1	0	-		-		-		1	0
Wuhan Zall	2011	China League One	1	0	0	0	-		-		1	0
Wuhan Zall	2012	China League One	0	0	0	0	-		-		0	0
Wuhan Zall	2013	Chinese Super League	0	0	0	0	-		-		0	0
Wuhan Zall	Total		3	0	0	0	0	0	0	0	3	0
Jiangxi Liansheng	2014	China League Two	19	0	2	0	-		-		21	0
Jiangxi Liansheng	2015	China League One	25	0	0	0	-		-		25	0
Jiangxi Liansheng	2016	China League Two	2	0	0	0	-		-		2	0
Jiangxi Liansheng	Total		46	0	2	0	0	0	0	0	48	0
Shenzhen Ledman	2017	China League Two	14	0	0	0	-		-		14	0
Shenzhen Ledman	2018	China League Two	11	0	0	0	-		-		11	0
Shenzhen Ledman	Total		25	0	0	0	0	0	0	0	25	0
Wuhan Three Towns	2019	China League Two	32	0	1	0	-		-		33	0
Wuhan Three Towns	2020	China League Two	12	0	-		-		-		12	0
Wuhan Three Towns	2021	China League One	12	0	2	0	-		-		14	0
Wuhan Three Towns	2022	Chinese Super League	7	0	2	0	-		-		9	0
Wuhan Three Towns	Total		63	0	5	0	0	0	0	0	68	0
Career total			137	0	7	0	0	0	0	0	144	0

== Honours ==
Jiangxi Liansheng

- China League Two: 2014

Wuhan Three Towns

- Chinese Super League: 2022
- China League One: 2021
- China League Two: 2020
- Chinese FA Super Cup: 2023
