= Jiang Weilang =

Chinese footballer (born 2002)

Personal information
- Date of birth: 5 August 2002 (age 24)
- Place of birth: Xiantao, Hubei, China
- Height: 1.80 m (5 ft 11 in)
- Position: Defender

Team information
- Current team: Wuhan Three Towns B
- Number: 3

Youth career
- Evergrande Football School
- Guangzhou Evergrande

Senior career*
Years	Team	Apps	(Gls)
2020–2024	Guangzhou FC	0	(0)
2021	→ Llanera (loan)	0	(0)
2023–2024	→ Haikou Mingcheng (loan)	38	(0)
2025	Guangzhou Dandelion Alpha	1	(0)
2025–	Wuhan Three Towns B	7	(0)

International career
2017	China U16		
- * Club domestic league appearances and goals as of 00:01, 15 January 2022 (UTC)

Jiang Weilang (Chinese: 蒋维朗; born 5 August 2002) is a Chinese footballer who plays as a defender who plays for Chinese football club Wuhan Three Towns B.

== Club career ==
Born in Hubei, Jiang started at the Evergrande Football School in Guangdong, before joining Guangzhou FC. After one Chinese FA Cup appearance for Guangzhou FC, Wu moved to Spain to join Sporting de Gijón, alongside teammates He Xinjie and Wu Junjie. In his first season, he was loaned to affiliate club Llanera in the Segunda División RFEF.

After failing to make an impact in Spain, his contract was terminated at the end of 2021, and he returned to China, re-joining Guangzhou in mid-2022.

== Career statistics ==
=== Club ===
As of 15 January 2022.

Appearances and goals by club, season and competition
Club	Season	League			Cup		Other		Total	
Club	Season	Division	Apps	Goals	Apps	Goals	Apps	Goals	Apps	Goals
Guangzhou FC	2020	Chinese Super League	0	0	1 (Note: Appearances in the Chinese FA Cup)	0	0	0	1	0
Guangzhou FC	2021	Chinese Super League	0	0	0	0	0	0	0	0
Guangzhou FC	Total		0	0	1	0	0	0	1	0
Sporting de Gijón B	2021–22	Tercera División RFEF	0	0	0	0	0	0	0	0
Llanera (loan)	2021–22	Segunda División RFEF	0	0	0	0	0	0	0	0
Guangzhou FC	2022	Chinese Super League	0	0	0	0	0	0	0	0
Career total			0	0	1	0	0	0	1	0
