= Guo Jiayu =

Chinese association football player

Personal information
- Date of birth: 27 August 2004 (age 22)
- Place of birth: Shijiazhuang, Hebei, China
- Height: 1.85 m (6 ft 1 in)
- Position: Goalkeeper

Team information
- Current team: Wuhan Three Towns
- Number: 31

Youth career
- –2021: Guangzhou FC

Senior career*
Years	Team	Apps	(Gls)
2021	Guangzhou FC	0	(0)
2021–	Wuhan Three Towns	21	(0)
2022	→ Hainan Star (loan)	3	(0)
- * Club domestic league appearances and goals as of 22 November 2026

Guo Jiayu (Chinese: 郭嘉宇; born 27 August 2004) is a Chinese footballer currently playing as a goalkeeper for Wuhan Three Towns.

== Club career ==
Guo Jiayu was promoted to the senior team of top-tier club Guangzhou FC in the 2021 Chinese Super League season and was handed his debut in a Chinese FA Cup game on 13 October 2021 against Qingdao Youth Island in a 1–0 defeat. He would go on to join Wuhan Three Towns and was included in the senior team for the 2022 Chinese Super League campaign. On 29 August 2022 he was loaned out to third-tier club Hainan Star.

== Career statistics ==
As of 22 November 2025.

Club	Season	League			Cup		Continental		Other		Total	
Club	Season	Division	Apps	Goals	Apps	Goals	Apps	Goals	Apps	Goals	Apps	Goals
Guangzhou	2021	Chinese Super League	0	0	1	0	-		0	0	1	0
Wuhan Three Towns	2022	Chinese Super League	0	0	0	0	-		-		0	0
Wuhan Three Towns	2023	Chinese Super League	0	0	0	0	0	0	0	0	0	0
Wuhan Three Towns	2024	Chinese Super League	0	0	0	0	-		-		0	0
Wuhan Three Towns	2025	Chinese Super League	12	0	1	0	-		-		13	0
Wuhan Three Towns	Total		12	0	1	0	0	0	0	0	13	0
Hainan Star (loan)	2022	China League Two	3	0	-		-		-		3	0
Career total			15	0	2	0	0	0	0	0	17	0

== Honours ==
=== Club ===
Wuhan Three Towns

- Chinese Super League: 2022.
