= Wu Junjie =

Chinese footballer (born 2002)

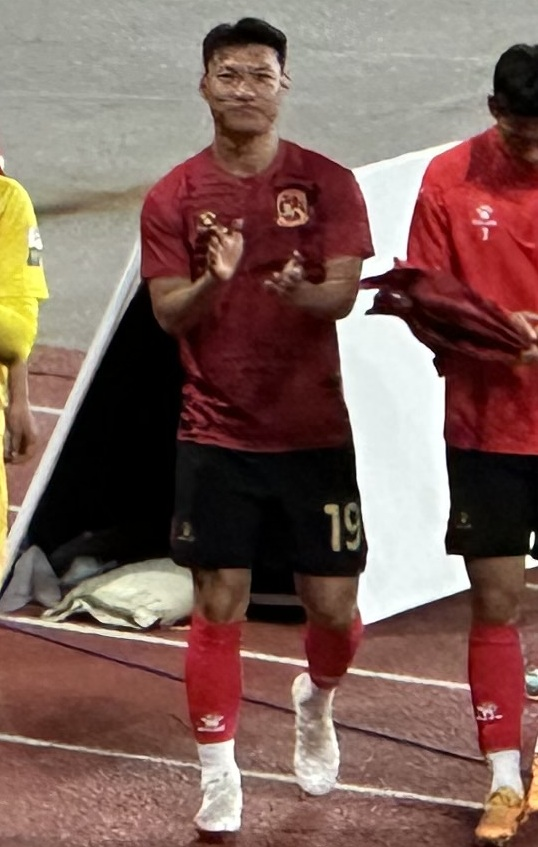
- Wu Junjie in May 2025

Personal information
- Date of birth: 28 February 2002 (age 24)
- Place of birth: Hefei, Anhui, China
- Height: 1.70 m (5 ft 7 in)
- Positions: Winger; forward

Team information
- Current team: Suzhou Dongwu
- Number: 19

Youth career
- Evergrande Football School
- Guangzhou Evergrande

Senior career*
Years	Team	Apps	(Gls)
2020–2024	Guangzhou FC	45	(2)
2021–2022	→ Sporting de Gijón B (loan)	15	(0)
2025–	Suzhou Dongwu	0	(0)
- * Club domestic league appearances and goals as of 00:01, 26 March 2024 (UTC)

Wu Junjie (Chinese: 吴俊杰; born 28 February 2002), known in Spain as Kun, is a Chinese footballer currently playing as a winger or forward for Suzhou Dongwu

== Club career ==
Born in Anhui, Wu started at the Evergrande Football School in Guangdong, before joining Guangzhou FC. He was promoted to the senior team and made his debut for the club in a Chinese FA Cup game on 26 November 2020 against Kunshan F.C. in a 3-0 defeat. After this lone appearance, Wu moved on loan to Sporting de Gijón in Spain alongside teammates He Xinjie and Jiang Weilang. He was assigned to Sporting de Gijón B for the season.

After his loan ended, he returned to Guangzhou, however the clubs majority shareholder was in financial trouble and the club lost several key players. As a result, the team was relegated from the top-tier following the 2022 Chinese Super League campaign, ending their twelve-season stay in the top flight. Wu remained with the team and went on to establish himself as a regular within the team.

On 6 February 2025, one month after Guangzhou FC failed to obtain their professional league license for the 2025 season, Wu joined China League One side Suzhou Dongwu on a free transfer.

== Career statistics ==
As of 26 March 2024.

Appearances and goals by club, season and competition
Club	Season	League			Cup		Continental		Other		Total	
Club	Season	Division	Apps	Goals	Apps	Goals	Apps	Goals	Apps	Goals	Apps	Goals
Guangzhou FC	2020	Chinese Super League	0	0	1	0	0 (Note: Appearances in the AFC Champions League)	0	–		1	0
Guangzhou FC	2021	Chinese Super League	0	0	0	0	0	0	–		0	0
Guangzhou FC	2023	China League One	17	0	1	0	–		–		18	0
Guangzhou FC	2024	China League One	3	1	0	0	–		–		3	1
Guangzhou FC	Total		20	1	2	0	0	0	0	0	22	1
Sporting de Gijón B	2021–22	Tercera División RFEF	15	0	–		–		–		15	0
Career total			35	1	2	0	0	0	0	0	37	1
