= Liu Yiheng =

Chinese association football player

Personal information
- Date of birth: 5 August 2003 (age 23)
- Place of birth: Wuhan, Hubei, China
- Height: 1.85 m (6 ft 1 in)
- Position: Forward

Team information
- Current team: Wuhan Three Towns B
- Number: 9

Youth career
- –2020: Wuhan Three Towns

Senior career*
Years	Team	Apps	(Gls)
2020–	Wuhan Three Towns	8	(0)
2022–2023	→ Hainan Star (loan)	27	(3)
2025	→ Lanzhou Longyuan Athletic (loan)	10	(2)
2026–	→ Wuhan Three Towns B (loan)	0	(0)

International career
2018–2019	China U-16		
2020–2021	China U-19		
- * Club domestic league appearances and goals as of 14:01, 29 April 2022 (UTC)

Liu Yiheng (Chinese: 刘轶恒; born 5 August 2003) is a Chinese footballer currently playing as a forward for Wuhan Three Towns B.

== Career statistics ==
=== Club ===
As of 16 January 2022.

Club	Season	League			Cup		Other		Total	
Club	Season	Division	Apps	Goals	Apps	Goals	Apps	Goals	Apps	Goals
Wuhan Three Towns	2020	China League Two	4	0	0	0	0	0	4	0
Wuhan Three Towns	2021	China League One	0	0	1 (Note: Appearances in the Chinese FA Cup)	0	0	0	1	0
Wuhan Three Towns	2022	Chinese Super League	0	0	0	0	0	0	0	0
Career total			4	0	1	0	0	0	5	0
