= Pedro Morilla =

Spanish footballer and manager

Personal information
- Full name: Pedro Morilla Pineda
- Date of birth: 31 October 1972 (age 53)
- Place of birth: Seville, Spain
- Height: 1.75 m (5 ft 9 in)
- Position: Midfielder

Youth career
- Betis
- Sevilla

Senior career*
Years	Team	Apps	(Gls)
- Mairena
1994–1996	Écija	17	(0)
1996–1999	Talavera	95	(9)
1999–2000	Murcia	6	(0)
2000	Burgos	12	(0)
2000–2001	Dos Hermanas	30	(1)
2001–2004	Talavera	101	(2)
2004–2005	Ciempozuelos		
Total		261	(12)

Managerial career
- 2005–2007: Ciempozuelos (youth)
- 2007: Ciempozuelos
- 2007–2008: Talavera
- 2008–2010: Móstoles
- 2010–2011: Marchamalo
- 2014–2015: Betis (youth)
- 2014: Betis B (interim)
- 2017–2018: Granada B
- 2018: Granada
- 2018–2019: Granada B
- 2021–2023: Wuhan Three Towns
- 2025–2025: Recreativo de Huelva
- * Club domestic league appearances and goals

Pedro Morilla Pineda (born 31 October 1972) is a Spanish professional football manager and former player who played predominantly as a midfielder.

== Playing career ==
Born in Seville, Andalusia, Morilla represented both Real Betis and Sevilla FC as a youth. After making his senior debut with CD Mairena, he moved to Segunda División B side Écija Balompié in 1994, appearing sparingly as his side achieved promotion to Segunda División.

Morilla made his debut in the second level on 3 December 1995, playing the last 14 minutes in a 1–2 home loss against CD Leganés. He left the club the following July, and signed for Talavera CF in the third level.

Morilla continued to appear in the lower leagues in the following years, representing Real Murcia, Burgos CF, Dos Hermanas CF, Talavera and CD Ciempozuelos. He retired with the latter in 2005, aged 32.

== Managerial career ==
Immediately after retiring Morilla became a coach, being appointed in charge of his last club Ciempozuelos' youth setup. In January 2007, he was appointed in charge of the first team in the fourth division.

On 8 November 2007 Morilla returned to Talavera, now named manager. After suffering relegation he left the club, and in November 2008 he took charge of CD Móstoles.

On 1 October 2010 Morilla was appointed manager of CD Marchamalo, leaving in June of the following year. He subsequently joined Betis' backroom staff, also being in charge of the Juvenil and the reserve squads.

In August 2016, Morilla joined Granada CF's staff. On 9 July of the following year, he replaced Lluís Planagumà at the helm of the B-side.

Morilla was named manager of the first team in the second tier on 19 March 2018, replacing fired José Luis Oltra. On 30 April, however, he was sacked.

He returned to the helm of the B-side in May 2018. However, Morilla was sacked in March 2019, after one win the last fourteen matches, which left Granada CF B at serious risk of relegation from the Segunda División B.

In July 2021, Morilla was appointed as caretaker manager of Wuhan Three Towns, where he worked as techniques director previously. In December 2021, he was promoted to manager for winning 14 matches in a row. In December 2022, he led the Wuhan Three Towns to their first ever Chinese Super League title. On 17 June 2023, he stepped down from the role after only 3 wins from the first 12 league games of the season.

On 17 June 2025, Morilla was appointed as manager of Recreativo de Huelva. he was later fired that year.

== Managerial statistics ==
As of 23 November 2025

Managerial record by team and tenure
Team	Nat	From	To	Record								Ref
Team	Nat	From	To	G	W	D	L	GF	GA	GD	Win %	Ref
Ciempozuelos	(Spain)	22 January 2007	8 November 2007	32	17	8	7	50	33	+17	53.13	
Talavera	(Spain)	8 November 2007	30 June 2008	27	5	7	15	25	46	−21	18.52	
Móstoles	(Spain)	3 November 2008	1 October 2010	72	29	21	22	91	77	+14	40.28	
Marchamalo	(Spain)	1 October 2010	30 June 2011	33	15	7	11	46	39	+7	45.45	
Betis B (interim)	(Spain)	26 November 2014	23 December 2014	4	2	1	1	5	3	+2	50.00	
Granada B	(Spain)	9 July 2017	19 March 2018	30	11	10	9	29	27	+2	36.67	
Granada	(Spain)	19 March 2018	30 April 2018	6	1	3	2	8	9	−1	16.67	
Granada B	(Spain)	15 May 2018	26 March 2019	30	8	8	14	28	35	−7	26.67	
Wuhan Three Towns	(China)	25 July 2021	17 June 2023	74	50	11	13	169	62	+107	67.57	
Recreativo de Huelva	(Spain)	17 June 2025	25 November 2025	11	5	2	4	12	10	+2	45.45	
Career Total				319	143	78	98	463	341	+122	44.83	—

== Honours ==
=== Manager ===
Wuhan Three Towns

- China League One: 2021
- Chinese Super League: 2022
- Chinese FA Super Cup: 2023
