= Wang Kang (footballer) =

Chinese footballer (born 2006)

Personal information
- Date of birth: 5 May 2006 (age 20)
- Height: 1.85 m (6 ft 1 in)
- Position: Defender

Team information
- Current team: Wuhan Three Towns
- Number: 37

Youth career
- Wuhan Three Towns

Senior career*
Years	Team	Apps	(Gls)
2025–	Wuhan Three Towns B	18	(1)
2025–	Wuhan Three Towns	17	(0)
- * Club domestic league appearances and goals as of 22 November 2026

Wang Kang (Chinese: 王康; pinyin: Wáng Kāng; born 5 May 2006) is a Chinese professional footballer who plays as a defender for Chinese Super League club Wuhan Three Towns.

== Early life and youth career ==
Wang was born on 5 May 2006. He came through the youth academy of Wuhan Three Towns.

In November 2025, Wang was part of the Hubei U20 men's football team that won the gold medal at the 15th National Games of China men's football U20 tournament.

== Club career ==
=== Wuhan Three Towns B ===
In March 2025, Wang was named in the squad list for Wuhan Three Towns B team ahead of the 2025 China League Two season, wearing the number 61 jersey. On 2 May 2025, Wang scored a goal in the China League Two preliminary stage Round 7 match against Guangxi Lanhang, helping Wuhan Three Towns B to a 4–0 victory. According to statistics, in the 2025 season, he made 18 appearances for Wuhan Three Towns B with 14 starts, scoring 1 goal.

In July 2025, Wang was promoted to the Wuhan Three Towns first team along with teammates Zeke Rula and Zhu Wenchuan.

=== Wuhan Three Towns ===
On 25 August 2025, Wang made his Chinese Super League debut as a substitute in a 0–4 away defeat to Beijing Guoan in Round 22. After the match, Wang stated in an interview that he was nervous during his debut but hoped to improve and adapt to the CSL rhythm.

In March 2026, Wang was included in Wuhan Three Towns' first team squad for the 2026 Chinese Super League season, wearing the number 37 jersey. On 17 April 2026, he started in a 0–1 home defeat to Chengdu Rongcheng in Round 6, being substituted off in the 77th minute. On 1 May 2026, he started in a 2–2 away draw against Tianjin Jinmen Tiger in Round 9. On 6 May 2026, Wang provided an assist in the 58th minute for Cádiz to score in a 1–3 home defeat to Qingdao Hainiu in Round 10. On 24 May 2026, he started in a 3–3 away draw against Shandong Taishan in Round 14. On 31 May 2026, he started in a 1–1 home draw against Yunnan Yukun in Round 15, being substituted off in the 57th minute.

== Career statistics ==
=== Club ===
As of 31 May 2026

Appearances and goals by club, season and competition
Club	Season	League			National Cup		Continental		Other		Total	
Club	Season	Division	Apps	Goals	Apps	Goals	Apps	Goals	Apps	Goals	Apps	Goals
Wuhan Three Towns B	2025	China League Two	18	1	0	0	—		—		18	1
Wuhan Three Towns	2025	Chinese Super League	4	0	0	0	—		—		4	0
Wuhan Three Towns	2026	Chinese Super League	11	0	0	0	—		—		11	0
Career total			33	1	0	0	0	0	0	0	33	1

== Honours ==
Hubei U20

- National Games of China men's football U20: 2025.
