= Denny Wang =

Italian professional footballer (born 1998)

Personal information
- Full name: Wang Yi
- Birth name: Denny Wang Yi
- Date of birth: 15 April 1998 (age 28)
- Place of birth: Alba, Italy
- Height: 1.76 m (5 ft 9 in)
- Position: Right-back

Team information
- Current team: Wuhan Three Towns
- Number: 28

Youth career
- 2010–2016: Juventus
- 2015–2016: → Carpi (youth loan)
- 2016–2017: Pro Vercelli

Senior career*
Years	Team	Apps	(Gls)
2017–2018	Borgosesia	19	(0)
2021–2022	Shanghai Shenhua	30	(2)
2023–	Wuhan Three Towns	55	(1)

International career^{‡}
	Italy U17	3	(0)
- * Club domestic league appearances and goals as of 22 November 2026 ‡ National team caps and goals as of 19:59, 1 January 2022 (UTC)

Denny Wang
- Chinese: 王毅
Transcriptions
Standard Mandarin
- Hanyu Pinyin: Wáng Yì

Denny Wang Yi (Chinese: 王毅; born 15 April 1998) is an Italian professional footballer who plays as a right-back for Chinese Super League club Wuhan Three Towns. Born in Italy, he renounced his Italian passport to receive the Chinese citizenship in 2021.

== Club career ==
As a youth player, Wang joined the youth academy of Juventus and initially played as a midfielder. He continued his development with fourth tier Italian club Borgosesia, where he graduated to their senior team within the 2017–18 Serie D campaign. While he gained playing time as a right-back at Borgosesia, his contract was not extended and he trained with Chinese club Shenzhen while he looked to change his Italian nationality to Chinese.

On 14 March 2021, Wang regained his Chinese nationality and signed for Chinese Super League side Shanghai Shenhua. He made his debut in a Chinese FA Cup game on 14 October 2021 against Sichuan Minzu in a 3-0 victory. Wang made his league debut on 12 December 2021 against Qingdao in a 3-0 victory. After this game he would go on to establish himself as a regular member of the team and go on to score his first goal on 25 November 2022 against Beijing Guoan in a 2-1 defeat.

On 4 April 2023, Wang did not sign his contract with Shenhua and joined defending Chinese Super League champions Wuhan Three Towns. On 8 April 2023 he made his debut for the club in the 2023 Chinese FA Super Cup against Shandong Taishan in a 2-0 victory.

== Career statistics ==
As of 1 March 2026.

Club	Season	League			Cup		Continental		Other		Total	
Club	Season	Division	Apps	Goals	Apps	Goals	Apps	Goals	Apps	Goals	Apps	Goals
Borgosesia	2017–18	Serie D	19	0	0	0	-		-		19	0
Shanghai Shenhua	2021	Chinese Super League	7	0	1	0	-		-		8	0
Shanghai Shenhua	2022	Chinese Super League	23	2	2	0	-		-		25	2
Shanghai Shenhua	Total		30	2	3	0	0	0	0	0	33	2
Wuhan Three Towns	2023	Chinese Super League	13	0	2	0	1	0	1 (Note: Appearances in Chinese FA Super Cup)	0	17	0
Wuhan Three Towns	2024	Chinese Super League	17	1	1	0	-		-		18	1
Wuhan Three Towns	2025	Chinese Super League	18	0	1	0	-		-		19	0
Wuhan Three Towns	Total		48	1	4	0	1	0	1	0	54	1
Career total			97	3	7	0	1	0	1	0	106	3

== Honours ==
Wuhan Three Towns

- Chinese FA Super Cup: 2023
