= Xu Xiaofei =

Chinese footballer

Xu Xiaofei 徐晓飞
Personal information
- Full name: Xu Xiaofei
- Date of birth: 7 March 1982 (age 44)
- Place of birth: Zhengzhou, Henan, China
- Height: 1.73 m (5 ft 8 in)
- Position: Midfielder

Team information
- Current team: Minami Club
- Number: 15

Youth career
- 1999–2004: Kanoya P.E. University

Senior career*
Years	Team	Apps	(Gls)
2005	Consadole Sapporo	11	(0)
2006–2007	Kamatamare Sanuki	20	(9)
2007	Gainare Tottori	7	(0)
2008	Mitsubishi Mizushima	16	(0)
2009	Henan Construction	1	(0)
2012–	Minami Club		

International career^{‡}
1998	China U-16		
2003	China U-23		
- * Club domestic league appearances and goals as of 1 November 2009 ‡ National team caps and goals as of 1 October 2009

Xu Xiaofei (Chinese: 徐晓飞; born March 7, 1982, in Zhengzhou), is a Chinese footballer who currently plays for Minami Club in the Shikoku Adult League.

== Club career ==
=== Career in Japan ===
While Xu Xiaofei grew up in the city of Zhengzhou in the province of Henan, his mother would move him to Japan as a 10-year-old child. He would continue to live and study sports in Japan where he would graduate from university and then start his football career with second division side Consadole Sapporo in the 2005 J. League season. This was, however, short-lived, and he would move to fourth-tier side Kamatamare Sanuki, where he gained more playing time and caught the eye of third-tier teams Gainare Tottori and then Mitsubishi Mizushima FC, yet none of these moves were particularly successful.

=== Return to China ===
Xu Xiaofei would return to China and move to his local football team Henan Construction halfway through the 2009 Chinese Super League season. But in a medical examination after the 2009 league season, he was diagnosed with cardiac arrhythmia, then he announced his retirement in his blog.

== Club statistics ==
Club performance			League		Cup		Total	
Season	Club	League	Apps	Goals	Apps	Goals	Apps	Goals
Japan			League		Emperor's Cup		Total	
2005	Consadole Sapporo	J2 League	11	0	0	0	11	0
2006	Kamatamare Sanuki	Regional Leagues	12	5	1	0	13	5
2007	Kamatamare Sanuki	Regional Leagues	8	4	0	0	8	4
2007	Gainare Tottori	Football League	7	0	2	0	9	0
2008	Mitsubishi Mizushima	Football League	16	0	-		16	0
China PR			League		FA Cup		Total	
2009	Henan Construction	Super League	1	0	0	0	1	0
Country	Japan		54	9	3	0	57	9
Country	China PR		1	0	0	0	1	0
Total			55	9	3	0	58	9
