= Deng Zhuoxiang =

Chinese footballer (born 1988)

Deng Zhuoxiang 邓卓翔
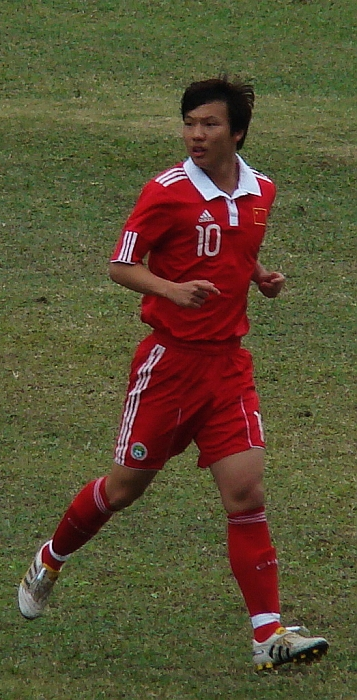

Personal information
- Full name: Deng Zhuoxiang
- Date of birth: 24 October 1988 (age 38)
- Place of birth: Wuhan, Hubei, China
- Height: 1.81 m (5 ft 11 in)
- Position: Midfielder

Team information
- Current team: Wuhan Three Towns (caretaker)

Youth career
- 2001–2004: Guangdong Mingfeng
- 2005: Wuhan Optics Valley

Senior career*
Years	Team	Apps	(Gls)
2006–2008	Wuhan Optics Valley	35	(3)
2009	Jiangsu Sainty	29	(5)
2010–2011	Shandong Luneng	48	(7)
2012–2014	Jiangsu Sainty	38	(2)
2015–2017	Shanghai Shenhua	3	(0)
2017	→ Qingdao Huanghai (loan)	29	(5)
2018–2020	Beijing Enterprises Group	30	(0)
2020–2022	Wuhan Three Towns	40	(3)

International career^{‡}
2003–2005	China U17		
2006–2007	China U20		
2009–2011	China	30	(7)

Managerial career
- 2024–2025: Wuhan Three Towns (assistant)
- 2025: Wuhan Three Towns (caretaker)
- 2026: Wuhan Three Towns (caretaker)
- 2026–: Wuhan Three Towns (caretaker)
Medal record
Representing China
Men's football
EAFF Championship
Gold medal – first place	2010 Japan	Team
AFC U-17 Championship
Gold medal – first place	2004 Japan	Team
- * Club domestic league appearances and goals as of 20 December 2023 ‡ National team caps and goals as of 3 April 2015

Deng Zhuoxiang (simplified Chinese: 邓卓翔; traditional Chinese: 鄧卓翔; pinyin: Dèng Zhuóxiáng, born 24 October 1988) is a Chinese football coach and former footballer who played as a midfielder.

== Club career ==
Deng Zhuoxiang started his football career in the 2005 league season playing for Wuhan Optics Valley; however, he would have to wait until the 2006 league season to make his debut against Tianjin Teda on 12 July 2006 in a 4–3 loss. Throughout the season, he would steadily establish himself within the squad by playing in 10 league games, though this was often as a substitute. By the 2007 league season, Deng would establish himself within the team and even score his first goal against Qingdao Jonoon in a 1–0 win on 27 March 2007. While now a regular starter for Wuhan, he found that they were controversially relegated then subsequently disbanded during the 2008 season after the club's management did not accept the punishment given to them by the Chinese Football Association after a scuffle broke out during a match against Beijing Guoan on 27 September 2008.

Without a club, Deng would be loaned to the newly promoted Jiangsu Sainty by Hubei F.A. at the beginning of the 2009 league season. He would go on to play in 29 league games in the season, scoring five goals and providing six assists. On 4 December 2009, he was named as the Chinese Football Association Young Player of the Year and would then transfer to Shandong Luneng shortly after. He would go on to make his debut on 24 February 2010 against Sanfrecce Hiroshima in an AFC Champions League game that Shandong won 1–0. In his debut season for Shandong, he would have to fight for his position against Wang Yongpo; however, he quickly established himself as an integral member of the team and aid the club to the 2010 league title by the end of his first season.

Deng transferred back to Jiangsu on 6 February 2012. However, Deng did not play during the 2012 season, missing out after doctors found fractured bone fragments in his knee. He was flown to Germany to get surgery and recover for most of the season. Deng finally made his debut for Jiangsu in the final game of the season, coming off the bench in a 1–1 draw against Guangzhou R&F. He would miss the beginning of the 2013 season with a fear of a possible leg inflammation. Deng returned in his first appearance of the season on 22 June 2013 in a 2–1 win against Shandong Luneng. He scored his first goal for Jiangsu on 19 October 2013 against Shandong in a 1–1 draw.

On 16 February 2015, Deng transferred to fellow Chinese Super League side Shanghai Shenhua. He made his debut for the club on 8 March 2015 in a 6–2 win against Shanghai Shenxin. Throughout the season Deng was limited to only three games after his 2012 knee injury made a recurrence. It was discovered that there was fragments of cartilage causing him discomfort and he needed more surgery on his knee. On 22 February 2017, Deng was loaned to China League One side Qingdao Huanghai until 31 December 2017.

On 28 February 2018, Deng transferred to China League One side Beijing Enterprises Group.

On 5 August 2020, Wuhan Three Towns announced his joining. In his first season with the club he would go on to aid them in winning the division title and promotion into the second tier. This would be followed by another division title win and promotion as the club entered the top tier for the first tine in their history. The following campaign he would be part of the squad that won the 2022 Chinese Super League title.

== International career ==
Deng made his international debut on 18 July 2009 in a 3–1 win against Palestine. He would go on to be mainly used in friendlies until he was given a run of games in the 2010 East Asian Football Championship. On 10 February 2010, he scored his first goal in a 3–0 win against South Korea and help China beat them for the first time, ending the team's Koreaphobia. On 4 June 2010, Deng scored from a direct free kick in a 1–0 win against France, condemning the latter to a shock defeat.

== Coaching career ==
In 2025, Deng was appointed as the caretaker of Wuhan Three Towns. On 2 January 2026, Deng was appointed as the sporting director after Benjamín Mora became the new head coach. On May 8, 2026, he returned to the position of interim manager following Mora's dismissal.

On 6 October 2026, Deng returned to his position as caretaker after Ricardo Soares's departure.

== Career statistics ==
=== Club statistics ===
Statistics accurate as of match played 11 January 2023.

Appearances and goals by club, season and competition
Club	Season	League			National Cup		Continental		Other		Total	
Club	Season	Division	Apps	Goals	Apps	Goals	Apps	Goals	Apps	Goals	Apps	Goals
Wuhan Optics Valley	2006	Chinese Super League	10	0	0	0	-		-		10	0
Wuhan Optics Valley	2007	Chinese Super League	15	2	-		-		-		15	2
Wuhan Optics Valley	2008	Chinese Super League	10	1	-		-		-		10	1
Wuhan Optics Valley	Total		35	3	0	0	0	0	0	0	35	3
Jiangsu Sainty	2009	Chinese Super League	29	5	-		-		-		29	5
Shandong Luneng	2010	Chinese Super League	28	5	-		2	0	-		30	5
Shandong Luneng	2011	Chinese Super League	20	2	2	0	4	1	-		26	3
Shandong Luneng	Total		48	7	2	0	6	1	0	0	56	8
Jiangsu Sainty	2012	Chinese Super League	1	0	0	0	-		-		1	0
Jiangsu Sainty	2013	Chinese Super League	12	1	2	0	0	0	0 (Note: Appearances in Chinese FA Super Cup)	0	14	1
Jiangsu Sainty	2014	Chinese Super League	25	1	4	1	-		-		29	2
Jiangsu Sainty	Total		38	2	6	1	0	0	0	0	44	3
Shanghai Shenhua	2015	Chinese Super League	3	0	0	0	-		-		3	0
Shanghai Shenhua	2016	Chinese Super League	0	0	2	0	-		-		2	0
Shanghai Shenhua	Total		3	0	2	0	0	0	0	0	5	0
Qingdao Huanghai (loan)	2017	China League One	29	5	1	0	-		-		30	5
Beijing Enterprises Group	2018	China League One	11	0	1	0	-		-		12	0
Beijing Enterprises Group	2019	China League One	19	0	0	0	-		-		19	0
Beijing Enterprises Group	Total		30	0	0	0	0	0	0	0	31	0
Wuhan Three Towns	2020	China League Two	11	2	-		-		-		11	2
Wuhan Three Towns	2021	China League One	16	1	0	0	-		-		16	1
Wuhan Three Towns	2022	Chinese Super League	13	0	3	0	-		-		16	0
Wuhan Three Towns	Total		40	3	3	0	0	0	0	0	43	3
Career total			252	25	15	1	6	1	0	0	273	27

=== International goals ===
Results list China's goal tally first.

#	Date	Venue	Opponent	Score	Result	Competition
1	10 February 2010	Ajinomoto Stadium, Tokyo, Japan	South Korea	3–0	3–0	2010 East Asian Football Championship
2	4 June 2010	Stade Michel Volnay, Saint-Pierre, Réunion	France	1–0	1–0	Friendly
3	22 December 2010	Yuexiushan Stadium, Guangzhou, China	North Macedonia	1–0	1–0	Friendly
	2 January 2011	Qatar SC Stadium, Doha, Qatar	Iraq	3–2	3–2	Friendly^{1}
4	8 January 2011	Thani bin Jassim Stadium, Doha, Qatar	Kuwait	2–0	2–0	2011 AFC Asian Cup
5	8 June 2011	Guiyang Olympic Sports Center, Guiyang, China	North Korea	1–0	2–0	Friendly
6	28 July 2011	New Laos National Stadium, Vientiane, Laos	Laos	3–1	6–1	2014 FIFA World Cup qualifiers
7	28 July 2011	New Laos National Stadium, Vientiane, Laos	Laos	4–1	6–1	2014 FIFA World Cup qualifiers

== Honours ==
Shandong Luneng

- Chinese Super League: 2010

Wuhan Three Towns

- Chinese Super League: 2022.
- China League One: 2021
- China League Two: 2020

China U17

- AFC U-17 Championship: 2004

China

- East Asian Football Championship: 2010

Individual

- Chinese Football Association Young Player of the Year: 2009
