= Zhong Jinbao =

Chinese footballer (born 1994)

Zhong Jinbao 钟晋宝
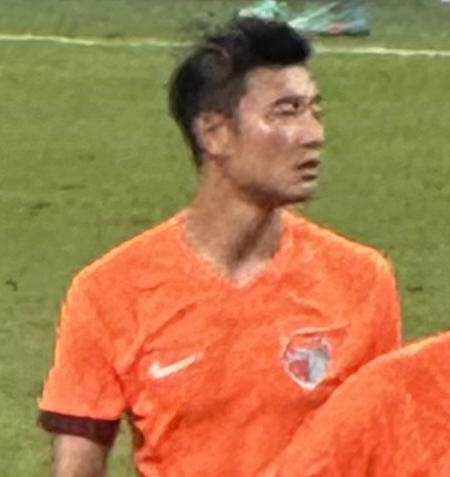
- Zhong Jinbao in August 2024

Personal information
- Date of birth: 25 November 1994 (age 31)
- Place of birth: Wuhan, Hubei, China
- Height: 1.81 m (5 ft 11 in)
- Position: Midfielder

Team information
- Current team: Wuhan Three Towns
- Number: 30

Senior career*
| Years | Team | Apps | (Gls) |
| 2013–2022 | Henan Songshan Longmen | 118 | (3) |
| 2023–2024 | Qingdao Hainiu | 44 | (0) |
| 2025– | Wuhan Three Towns | 29 | (2) |
- * Club domestic league appearances and goals as of 22 November 2026

Zhong Jinbao (Chinese: 钟晋宝; born 25 November 1994) is a Chinese professional footballer who currently plays for Chinese Super League side Wuhan Three Towns.

== Club career ==
In 2013, Zhong Jinbao started his professional footballer career with Henan Jianye (now known as Henan) in the China League One. On 16 August 2015, Zhong made his debut for Henan in the 2015 Chinese Super League against Guangzhou R&F, coming on as a substitute for Mirahmetjan Muzepper in the 53rd minute. He scored his first senior goal on 24 July 2016 in a 4–1 away loss against Jiangsu Suning.

On 27 January 2025, Zhong signed Chinese Super League club Wuhan Three Towns.

== Career statistics ==
Statistics accurate as of match played 31 December 2022.

| Club | Season | League | | | National Cup | | Continental | | Other | | Total | |
| Club | Season | Division | Apps | Goals | Apps | Goals | Apps | Goals | Apps | Goals | Apps | Goals |
|---|---|---|---|---|---|---|---|---|---|---|---|---|
| Henan Jianye/ Henan Songshan Longmen | 2013 | China League One | 0 | 0 | 0 | 0 | - | | - | | 0 | 0 |
| Henan Jianye/ Henan Songshan Longmen | 2014 | Chinese Super League | 0 | 0 | 0 | 0 | - | | - | | 0 | 0 |
| Henan Jianye/ Henan Songshan Longmen | 2015 | Chinese Super League | 5 | 0 | 0 | 0 | - | | - | | 5 | 0 |
| Henan Jianye/ Henan Songshan Longmen | 2016 | Chinese Super League | 17 | 1 | 4 | 0 | - | | - | | 21 | 1 |
| Henan Jianye/ Henan Songshan Longmen | 2017 | Chinese Super League | 27 | 2 | 2 | 0 | - | | - | | 29 | 2 |
| Henan Jianye/ Henan Songshan Longmen | 2018 | Chinese Super League | 15 | 0 | 1 | 0 | - | | - | | 16 | 0 |
| Henan Jianye/ Henan Songshan Longmen | 2019 | Chinese Super League | 14 | 0 | 1 | 0 | - | | - | | 14 | 0 |
| Henan Jianye/ Henan Songshan Longmen | 2020 | Chinese Super League | 16 | 0 | 1 | 0 | - | | - | | 17 | 0 |
| Henan Jianye/ Henan Songshan Longmen | 2021 | Chinese Super League | 13 | 0 | 6 | 1 | - | | - | | 19 | 1 |
| Henan Jianye/ Henan Songshan Longmen | 2022 | Chinese Super League | 11 | 0 | 1 | 1 | - | | - | | 12 | 1 |
| Henan Jianye/ Henan Songshan Longmen | Total | | 118 | 3 | 16 | 2 | 0 | 0 | 0 | 0 | 134 | 5 |
| Qingdao Hainiu | 2023 | Chinese Super League | 0 | 0 | 0 | 0 | - | | - | | 0 | 0 |
| Career total | | | 118 | 3 | 16 | 2 | 0 | 0 | 0 | 0 | 134 | 5 |

== Honours ==
=== Club ===
Henan Jianye

- China League One: 2013.
