= Shi Songchen =

Chinese footballer (born 2005)

Personal information
- Date of birth: 30 December 2005 (age 20)
- Place of birth: Dalian, Liaoning, China
- Height: 1.85 m (6 ft 1 in)
- Position: Defender

Team information
- Current team: Shandong Taishan
- Number: 15

Youth career
- Shandong Luneng Taishan Football School

Senior career*
Years	Team	Apps	(Gls)
2023–	Shandong Taishan	18	(0)

International career^{‡}
2024–2025	China U20	10	(0)
2026–	China U23	3	(0)
Medal record
Men's football
Representing China
Asian Games
Bronze medal – third place	2026 Aichi–Nagoya	Team
- * Club domestic league appearances and goals as of 19 November 2026 ‡ National team caps and goals as of 2 July 2026

Shi Songchen (Chinese: 史松宸; pinyin: Shǐ Sōngchén; born 30 December 2005) is a Chinese professional footballer who plays as a defender for Chinese Super League club Shandong Taishan.

== Early life and youth career ==
Shi Songchen was born in Dalian, Liaoning on 30 December 2005. At age 11, he was sent by his parents to the Shandong Luneng Taishan Football School for a trial and was accepted. In 2019, representing the Luneng Football School U14 Red Team, he won the double championship in both the National Youth Football Super League Finals U-14 Group and the Chinese Football Association Cup Men's U-14 Group.

== Club career ==
=== Shandong Taishan ===
Shi Songchen is a product of the Shandong Taishan youth academy. In January 2023, he received his first call-up to the Shandong Taishan first team. During the 2024 season, he made 14 appearances in the Chinese League Two for Shandong Taishan B Team and one appearance in the Chinese Super League for the first team.

On 27 February 2025, Shandong Taishan Football Club officially announced that Shi Songchen had suffered a left ankle ligament and soft tissue injury, and an old avulsion fracture during training, with an expected recovery period of approximately six weeks. During the 2025 season, he made 10 appearances in the Chinese League Two and three appearances in the Chinese Super League.

On 14 February 2026, Shandong Taishan F.C. officially announced that the team had extended Shi Songchen's contract until 31 December 2030. On 21 April 2026, during Round 7 of the Chinese Super League, Shi Songchen started for Shandong Taishan in a 2–1 away victory against Tianjin Jinmen Tiger.

== International career ==
In June 2024, Shi Songchen represented the China U19 national men's football team at the 2024 CFA China Team "Silk Road · Huashan Cup" Weinan International Football Invitational Tournament, winning the championship with the team.

In February 2025, Shi Songchen served as captain for the China U20 national men's football team at the 2025 AFC U-20 Asian Cup. The team lost to Saudi Arabia U20 in the quarterfinals and failed to advance.

== Career statistics ==
=== Club ===
As of 2 July 2026

Appearances and goals by club, season and competition
Club	Season	League			National Cup		Continental		Other		Total	
Club	Season	Division	Apps	Goals	Apps	Goals	Apps	Goals	Apps	Goals	Apps	Goals
Shandong Taishan B	2024	China League Two	14	0	0	0	—		—		14	0
Shandong Taishan B	2025	China League Two	10	0	0	0	—		—		10	0
Shandong Taishan	2024	Chinese Super League	1	0	0	0	—		—		1	0
Shandong Taishan	2025	Chinese Super League	3	0	0	0	—		—		3	0
Shandong Taishan	2026	Chinese Super League	7	0	0	0	—		—		7	0
Shandong Taishan	Total		11	0	0	0	0	0	0	0	11	0
Career total			35	0	0	0	0	0	0	0	35	0

== Honours ==
China U19

- CFA China Team "Silk Road · Huashan Cup" Weinan International Football Invitational Tournament: 2024
