= Wuhan Three Towns F.C. =

Chinese association football club

Wuhan Three Towns 武汉三镇
- Full name: Wuhan Three Towns Football Club 武汉三镇足球俱乐部
- Founded: 2013; 13 years ago (as Wuhan Shangwen)
- Ground: Wuhan Sports Center, Wuhan, China
- Capacity: 54,000
- Chairman: Wang Fang
- Head coach: Deng Zhuoxiang
- League: Chinese Super League
- 2025: Chinese Super League, 13th of 16
Home colours	Away colours

Wuhan Three Towns Football Club (Chinese: 武汉三镇足球俱乐部; pinyin: Wǔhàn Sānzhèn Zúqiú Jùlèbù) is a Chinese professional football club based in Wuhan, Hubei, that competes in the Chinese Super League, the top tier of Chinese football. Wuhan Three Towns plays its home matches at the Wuhan Sports Center, located within Caidian District. Wuhan Three Towns had remarkably gone from playing in the fourth division of Chinese football, to winning the 2022 Chinese Super League in a matter of five years, and had won the league title for each of the top three divisions on its climb up the pyramid.

== History ==
=== Early history ===
Wuhan Shangwen logo used between 2013 and 2017

The club was established as Wuhan Shangwen (Simplified Chinese: 武汉尚文) in 2013 by the Wuhan Football Association and private investment from the Wuhan Benhui Group, to mainly focus on the development of youth players. In 2018, the club started to participate in the Wuhan Super League, and finished second right behind Wuhan Chufeng Heli. They also participated in the 2018 Chinese Champions League, and made it to the final round of 16 before being eliminated by Nanjing Shaye.

Ranking 11th in the 2018 Chinese Champions League, the club was later admitted into 2019 China League Two to fill the gap left by a withdrawn team, right after changing their name to Wuhan Three Towns F.C. in January 2019.

=== 2019–2021: Promotion to Super League ===
Albert Garcia Xicota would be appointed head coach of the club for the 2019 China League Two season and finished eleventh at the end of the season. The following campaign with the club, he would go on to guide them in winning the division title and promotion into the second tier. In July 2021, Pedro Morilla was appointed as caretaker manager of the club; he had previously worked as techniques director. In December 2021, he was promoted to manager for winning 14 matches in a row. This achievement would see Wuhan going on to win the 2021 China League One division and promotion to the top tier.

=== 2022: Super League champions ===
On 31 December 2022, Wuhan Three Towns won the 2022 Chinese Super League for the first time after several fixtures were cancelled due to a national COVID-19 outbreak. They were awarded a 3–0 win against Tianjin Jinmen Tiger, who had forfeited due to sick players, and had a better goal difference than Shandong Taishan to top the table.

=== 2023–present ===
On 17 June 2023, Morilla stepped down from his role after the club won only three games from the first 12 league games of the season. Japanese coach Tsutomu Takahata was appointed as his successor on the following day.

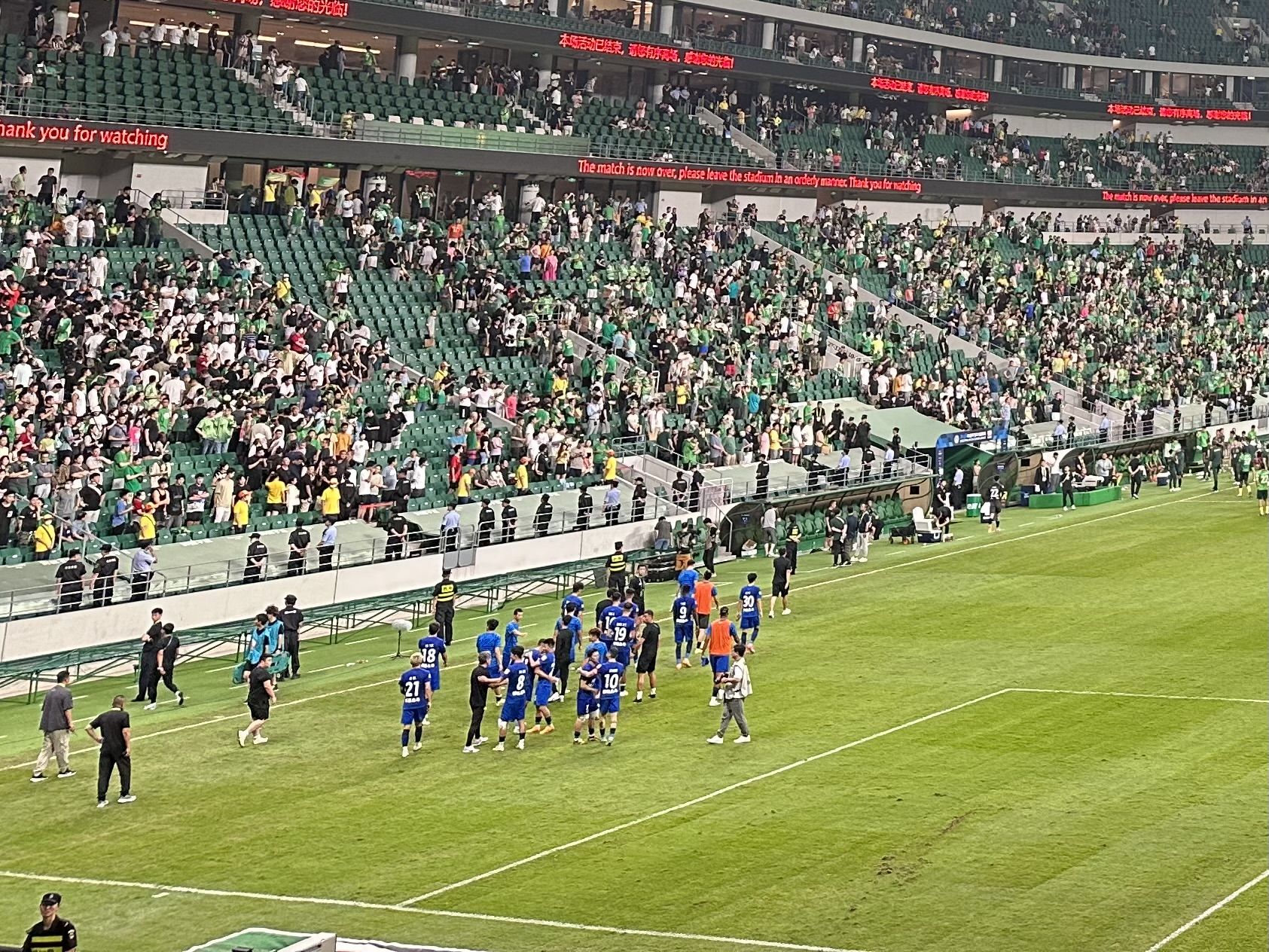
Wuhan Three Towns away at Beijing Guoan in the 2023 Chinese Super League

On 28 August 2023, the club's investors announced their intention to withdraw funding from the team, as well as selling it for free.

==== AFC Champions League debut ====
As league champions in the 2022 Chinese Super League season, the club qualified for the 2023–24 AFC Champions League group stage for the first time in the club history. They are drawn in group J with Urawa Red Diamonds, Pohang Steelers and Vietnamese club, Hanoi FC. On 20 September 2023, Wuhan Three Towns played their first ever AFC Champions League match against the defending champions Urawa Red Diamonds, which ended in a 2–2 draw at home.

In 2026, Wuhan Three Towns started the 2026 Chinese Super League season with five points deducted for violation of sports ethics and loss of sportsmanship, engaging in improper transactions to seek illegitimate benefits.

== Name history ==
- 2013–2018 Wuhan Shangwen F.C. 武汉尚文
- 2019–present Wuhan Three Towns F.C. 武汉三镇

== Current squad ==
=== First team ===
As of July 2026

Note: Flags indicate national team as defined under FIFA eligibility rules; some limited exceptions apply. Players may hold more than one non-FIFA nationality.

No.	Pos.	Nation	Player
1	GK	CHN	He Jianqiu
2	DF	CHN	He Guan
4	DF	CHN	Xu Haofeng (on loan from Henan FC)
5	DF	CHN	Li Shenyuan
6	MF	CHN	Long Wei
7	MF	BRA	Gustavo Sauer
8	MF	CHN	Wang Jinxian
9	FW	CHN	Zheng Haoqian
10	FW	GLP	Kilian Bevis
11	DF	CHN	Li Ang (on loan from Dalian Yingbo)
12	DF	CHN	Liao Chengjian
13	MF	CHN	Zheng Kaimu
15	DF	CHN	Chen Zhechao
16	MF	CHN	Min Zixi
17	MF	CHN	Halit Abdugheni
18	MF	CHN	Zhang Xiaobin

No.	Pos.	Nation	Player
19	DF	CHN	Liu Yiming
20	MF	BRA	Adriano
21	MF	CHN	Xiong Jizheng
22	GK	CHN	Fang Jingqi
24	FW	CHN	Jiang Lixun
25	DF	CHN	Ming Tian
27	MF	CHN	Xia Zihao
28	DF	ITA	Denny Wang
29	FW	VEN	Jhonder Cádiz
30	MF	CHN	Zhong Jinbao
31	GK	CHN	Guo Jiayu
33	MF	CHN	Liu Binbin (on loan from Shandong Taishan)
35	DF	CHN	Yu Tianle
37	FW	CHN	Wang Kang
50	MF	FRA	Antoine Leautey
54	MF	CHN	Xu Zhengpeng

=== B-team squad ===
As of July 2026

Note: Flags indicate national team as defined under FIFA eligibility rules; some limited exceptions apply. Players may hold more than one non-FIFA nationality.

No.	Pos.	Nation	Player
1	GK	CHN	He Jianqiu
3	DF	CHN	Jiang Weilang
4	DF	CHN	Zikrulla Memetimin
6	MF	CHN	Yang Fan
7	FW	CHN	Tan Jiaye
8	MF	CHN	He Xinjie
9	FW	CHN	Liu Yiheng
10	MF	CHN	Gao Yunan
11	MF	CHN	Wu Junhao
12	FW	CHN	He Sifan (on loan from Shandong Taishan)
14	DF	CHN	Song Ziqi
16	MF	CHN	Min Zixi
18	MF	CHN	Wu Chenfei
19	FW	CHN	Zhao Ziye (on loan from Shijiazhuang Gongfu)
24	FW	CHN	Jiang Lixun
25	DF	CHN	He Jincheng
26	DF	CHN	Ruan Jingyang
27	MF	CHN	Xia Zihao
29	DF	CHN	Zhang Xinyu

No.	Pos.	Nation	Player
30	MF	CHN	Yu Tanbo
32	DF	CHN	Xu Jiayi
33	DF	CHN	Zhang Peixiong
34	DF	CHN	Ruan Jingwei
35	DF	CHN	Yu Tianle
36	GK	CHN	Zheng Yiran
37	DF	CHN	Wang Kang
39	GK	CHN	Lu Rongte
41	MF	CHN	Li Xingchen
43	DF	CHN	Zhang Tao
45	DF	CHN	Wu Haonan
47	GK	CHN	Jin Donghui
48	DF	CHN	Yu Tianxiang
55	MF	CHN	Zhu Wenchuan
56	DF	CHN	Zhang Zhenyang
58	MF	CHN	Zou Weiwei
59	MF	CHN	Li Zigan
60	MF	CHN	Ke Yifan

=== Out on loan ===
Note: Flags indicate national team as defined under FIFA eligibility rules; some limited exceptions apply. Players may hold more than one non-FIFA nationality.

No. / Pos. / Nation / Player; — / GK / CHN / Wei Minzhe (at Shenzhen Peng City until 31 December 2026)	No. / Pos. / Nation / Player; — / DF / CHN / Shewketjan Tayir (at Nanjing City until 31 December 2026)

== Coaching staff ==
Position	Staff
Head coach & Sporting director	(China) Deng Zhuoxiang
Goalkeeping coach	(China) Liu Junfeng
Team manager	(China) Yu Chen
B-team head coach	(China) Chang Weiwei
B-team assistant coach	(China) Wang Peng
B-team assistant coach	(China) Dai Xu
B-team fitness coach	(China) Wang Huan

Source: CFA

== Managerial history ==
- (China) Zeng Qinggao (2018)
- (Spain) Albert Garcia Xicota (2019–2021)
- (Spain) Pedro Morilla (2021) (caretaker)
- (Spain) Pedro Morilla (2021–2023)
- (Japan) Tsutomu Takahata (2023)
- (Spain) Ricardo Rodríguez (2024)
- (Portugal) Filipe Martins (2025)
- (China) Deng Zhuoxiang (2025)
- (Mexico) Benjamín Mora (2026)
- (Portugal) Ricardo Soares (2026)
- (China) Deng Zhuoxiang (2026–present)

== Notable players ==
The following players had international caps for their respective countries.

Africa

- (Guinea-Bissau) Romário Baldé

Latin America

- (Brazil) Ademilson
- (Brazil) Wallace

Asia

- (China) Liu Dianzuo
- (China) Jiang Zhipeng
- (China) Deng Hanwen
- (China) Ren Hang
- (China) Xie Pengfei
- (China) Wei Shihao
- (China) Rong Hao
- (China) Gao Zhunyi
- (Chinese Taipei) Yaki Yen
- (South Korea) Park Ji-soo

Europe

- (Romania) Nicolae Stanciu

== Honours ==
League

- Chinese Super League
  - Champions (1): 2022
- China League One
  - Champions (1): 2021
- China League Two
  - Champions (1): 2020

Cup

- Chinese FA Super Cup
  - Champions (1): 2023

== Results ==
All-time league rankings

As of the end of 2025 season.

Year	Div	Pld	W	D	L	GF	GA	GD	Pts	Pos.	FA Cup	Super Cup	AFC	Att./G	Stadium
2018	4	5	4	0	1	13	6	7	9	Group Stage	DNQ	DNQ	DNQ		Tazi Lake Sports Centre
2019	3	9	14	10	6	33	18	15	52^{1}	11	R1	DNQ	DNQ		Hankou Cultural Sports Centre
2020	3	10	8	0	2	18	5	13	24	1	R1	DNQ	DNQ		Hankou Cultural Sports Centre
2021	2	34	25	4	5	73	25	48	79	1	R4	DNQ	DNQ		Hankou Cultural Sports Centre
2022	1	34	25	3	6	91	28	63	78	1	QF	DNQ	DNQ		Wuhan Sports Center
2023	1	30	14	9	7	51	35	16	51	7	R4	Winners	GS	15,866	Wuhan Sports Center
2024	1	30	8	7	15	31	44	−13	31	11	R4	DNQ	DNQ	8,522	Wuhan Sports Center
2025	1	30	6	7	17	34	62	−28	25	13	R3	DNQ	DNQ	9,564	Wuhan Sports Center

- ^1 In group stage.

Key

	China top division
	China second division
	China third division
	China fourth division
W	Winners
RU	Runners-up
3	Third place
	Relegated

- Pld = Played
- W = Games won
- D = Games drawn
- L = Games lost
- F = Goals for
- A = Goals against
- Pts = Points
- Pos = Final position
- DNQ = Did not qualify
- DNE = Did not enter
- NH = Not Held
- WD = Withdrawal
- – = Does Not Exist
- R1 = Round 1
- R2 = Round 2
- R3 = Round 3
- R4 = Round 4
- F = Final
- SF = Semi-finals
- QF = Quarter-finals
- R16 = Round of 16
- Group = Group stage
- GS2 = Second Group stage
- QR1 = First Qualifying Round
- QR2 = Second Qualifying Round
- QR3 = Third Qualifying Round

=== Continental results ===
Season	Competition	Round	Opposition	Home	Away	Aggregate
2023–24	AFC Champions League	Group J	(Japan) Urawa Red Diamonds	2–2	1–2	4th out of 4
2023–24	AFC Champions League	Group J	(South Korea) Pohang Steelers	1–1	1–3	4th out of 4
2023–24	AFC Champions League	Group J	(Vietnam) Hanoi FC	2–1	1–2	4th out of 4

== Affiliated clubs ==
- (Japan) Shonan Bellmare (2022–present)
