= China national football team results =

These are the China national football team results and fixtures.

== Best / Worst Results ==
=== Best ===
As of 19 November 2024

Number	Year	Opponent	Result
GD +10 and more
1	2000	Guam	19 – 0
-	1987	Nepal	12 – 0
2	2015	Bhutan	12 – 0
-	1987	Philippines	10 – 0
GD +9
3	2001	Maldives	10 – 1
4	1975	Brunei	10 – 1
-	1987	Philippines	9 – 0
GD +8
5	1985	Brunei	8 – 0
-	1987	Nepal	8 – 0
6	2000	Philippines	8 – 0
GD +7
7	2017	Philippines	8 – 1
-	1966	Palestine	7 – 0
8	1980	Sri Lanka	7 – 0
9	1980	Hong Kong	7 – 0
10	2004	Hong Kong	7 – 0
11	2007	Myanmar	7 – 0
12	2019	Guam	7 – 0
13	2021	Guam	7 – 0
GD +6
14	1966	Tanzania	10 – 4
15	1996	Macau	7 – 1
16	1966	Syria	6 – 0
17	1984	Jordan	6 – 0
18	1984	Afghanistan	6 – 0
19	2001	Lebanon	6 – 0
20	2015	Bhutan	6 – 0

=== Worst ===
As of 2 October 2026

Number	Year	Opponent	Result
GD -5 and more
1	2012	Brazil	0 – 8
2	2024	Japan	0 – 7
3	2018	Wales	0 – 6
-	1923	Australia	0 – 5
4	1992	United States	0 – 5
5	2026	Palestine	0 – 5
GD -4
-	1923	Australia	1 – 5
6	2013	Thailand	1 – 5
7	1948	Turkey	0 – 4
8	1952	Finland	0 – 4
9	1956	Yugoslavia	0 – 4
-	1985	Iran	0 – 4
10	2001	Iran	0 – 4
11	2002	Brazil	0 – 4
12	2010	Uruguay	0 – 4
13	2017	Colombia	0 – 4
GD -3
14	1992	Canada	2 – 5
-	1990	Iraq	1 – 4
15	1997	Iran	1 – 4
16	2006	Switzerland	1 – 4
17	2007	United States	1 – 4
18	2009	Saudi Arabia	1 – 4
19	2018	Czech Republic	1 – 4
20	1985	Australia	0 – 3
21	1993	Mexico	0 – 3
22	1996	England	0 – 3
23	1998	South Korea	0 – 3
24	2002	Turkey	0 – 3
25	2005	Spain	0 – 3
26	2007	Uzbekistan	0 – 3
27	2019	Iran	0 – 3
28	2021	Australia	0 – 3
29	2022	South Korea	0 – 3
30	2023	South Korea	0 – 3
31	2025	South Korea	0 – 3
32	2026	New Zealand	0 – 3

== Results by years ==
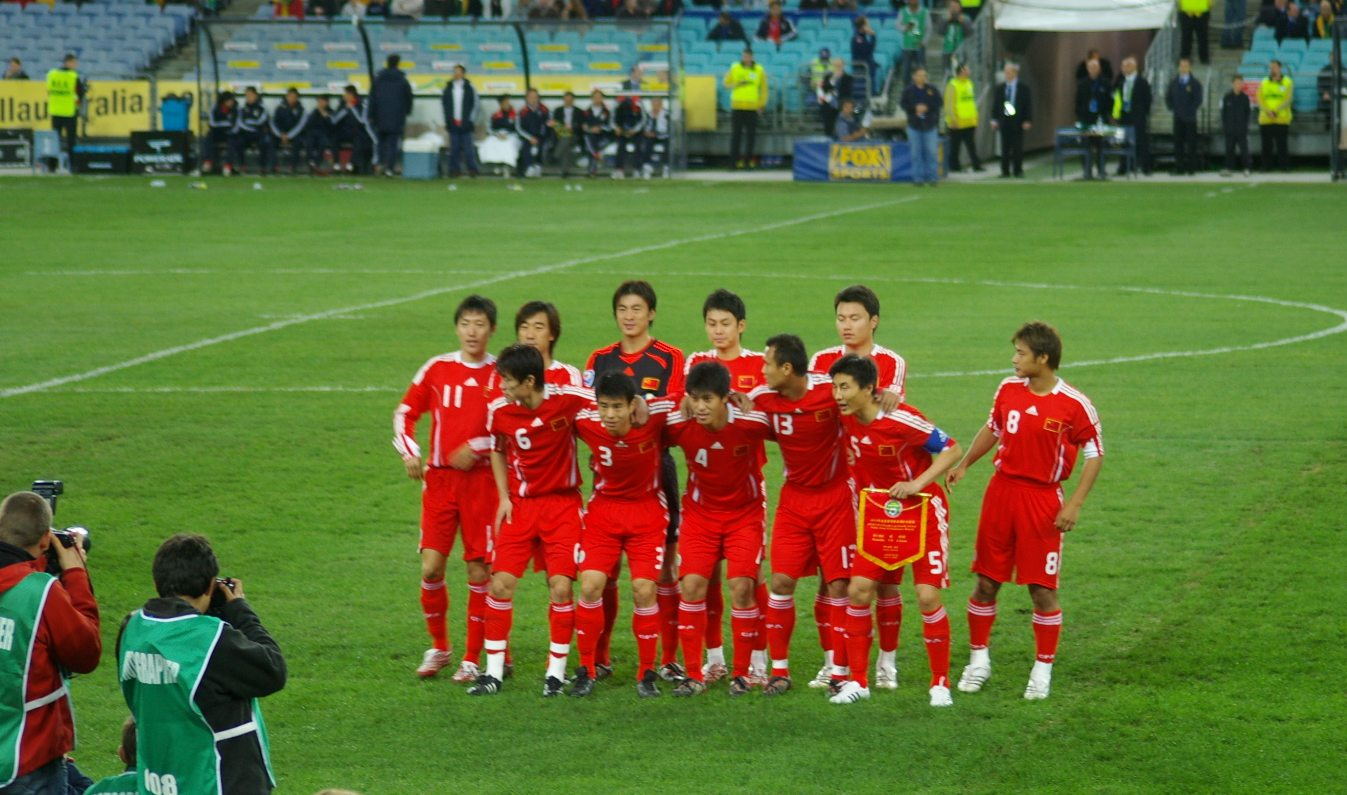
Team photo versus Australia, 22 June 2008, played at Stadium Australia, Sydney. China won 1–0.

== See also ==
- China national football team head to head
- China women's national football team results and fixtures
